= Swimming at the 2003 World Aquatics Championships – Men's 4 × 200 metre freestyle relay =

Men's 4×200m Free Relay at the 2003 FINA World Aquatics Championships
- Dates: July 23
- Nations: 17
- Winning time: 7 minutes 8.58 seconds

Medalists
gold medal	Australia
silver medal	USA
bronze medal	Germany

The Men's 4×200 Freestyle Relay event at the 10th FINA World Aquatics Championships swam on July 23, 2003. Preliminary heats swam in the morning session that day, with the top eight teams advancing to swim again in the Final that evening.

At the start of the event, the existing World (WR) and Championship (CR) records were both:

- WR and CR: 7:04.66 swum by Australia on July 27, 2001 in Fukuoka, Japan

== Results ==
=== Final ===
Rank	Nation	Swimmers	Time	Notes
1	Australia	Grant Hackett, Craig Stevens, Nicholas Sprenger, Ian Thorpe	7:08.58	
2	USA	Michael Phelps, Nate Dusing, Aaron Peirsol, Klete Keller	7:10.26	
3	Germany	Johannes Oesterling, Lars Conrad, Stefan Herbst, Christian Keller	7:14.02	
4	Italy	Matteo Pelliciari, Emiliano Brembilla, Federico Cappellazzo, Massimiliano Rosolino	7:14.32	
5	Canada	Brian Johns, Mike Mintenko, Mark Johnston, Rick Say	7:17.38	
6	Great Britain	Simon Burnett, Ross Davenport, Robin Francis, Edward Sinclair	7:18.99	
7	Greece	Nikolaos Xylouris, Athanasios Oikonomou, Andreas Zisimos, Dimitros Manganas	7:20.60	
8	China	Liu Yu, Wu Peng, Huang Shaohua, Chen Zuo	7:27.96	

=== Preliminaries ===
Rank	Heat/Lane	Nation	Swimmers	Time	Notes
1	H2 L4	United States	Scott Goldblatt, Chad Carvin; Kevin Clements, Klete Keller	7:15.91	q
2	H3 L4	Australia	Antony Matkovich, Nicholas Sprenger; Jason Cram, Craig Stevens	7:17.68	q
3	H1 L4	Italy	Filippo Magnini, Alessio Boggiatto; Matteo Pelliciari, Christian Galenda	7:19.61	q
4	H2 L5	Germany	Johannes Oesterling, Lars Conrad; Helge Meeuw, Christian Keller	7:19.67	q
5	H3 L5	Canada	Brian Johns, Rick Say; Mark Johnston, Brent Hayden	7:20.30	q
6	H3 L3	Great Britain	Simon Burnett, Ross Davenport; Adam Faulkner, Edward Sinclair	7:20.86	q
7	H1 L5	Greece	Nikolaos Xylouris, Athanasios Oikonomou; Andreas Zisimos, Dimitros Manganas	7:21.27	q
8	H1 L3	China	Liu Yu, Wu Peng; Huang Shaohua, Chen Zuo	7:21.74	q
9	H3 L6	Brazil	Rodrigo Castro, Gustavo Borges; Rafael Mosca, Carlos Jayme	7:25.33	
10	H3 L7	Netherlands	Martijn Zuijdweg, Arnold van Bavel; Thomas Felten, Klaas Erik Zwering	7:25.46	
11	H1 L6	Ukraine	Sergiy Fesenko, Yuri Yegoshin; Dmytro Vereitinov, Maksym Kokosha	7:25.53	
12	H2 L3	Spain	Olaf Wildeboer, Javier Nunez; Albert Medrano, Marco Rivera	7:29.89	
13	H2 L6	Switzerland	Dominik Meichtry, Gerry Strasser; David Richard, Philipp Gilgen	7:33.00	
14	H2 L2	Chile	Gian Carlo Zolezzi, Carlos Castro; Roberto Peñailillo, Max Schnettler	7:42.73	
15	H1 L2	Uzbekistan	Timur Irgashev, Petr Vasilev; Sergey Tsoy, Alexander Agafonov	7:54.27	
16	H2 L7	Seychelles	Kenny Roberts, Bertrand Bristol; Barnsley Albert, Jean Paul Adam	8:23.35	
-	-	Slovenia		DNS	
