= 2002 Pan Pacific Swimming Championships – Men's 100 metre freestyle =

Men's 100 metre freestyle at the 2002 Pan Pacific Swimming Championships
- Venue: Yokohama International Swimming Pool
- Dates: August 27, 2002 (heats & semifinals); August 28, 2002 (final)
- Competitors: 38 from 13 nations
- Winning time: 48.84

Medalists
gold medal	Ian Thorpe	Australia
silver medal	Ashley Callus	Australia
bronze medal	Nate Dusing	United States

The men's 100 metre freestyle competition at the 2002 Pan Pacific Swimming Championships took place on August 27–28 at the Yokohama International Swimming Pool. The last champion was Michael Klim of Australia.

This race consisted of two lengths of the pool, both lengths being in freestyle.

== Records ==
Prior to this competition, the existing world and Pan Pacific records were as follows:

World record	Pieter van den Hoogenband (NED)	47.84	Sydney, Australia	September 19, 2000
Pan Pacific Championships record	Michael Klim (AUS)	48.81	Sydney, Australia	August 25, 1999

== Results ==
All times are in minutes and seconds.

KEY:	q	Fastest non-qualifiers	Q	Qualified	CR	Championships record	NR	National record	PB	Personal best	SB	Seasonal best

=== Heats ===
The first round was held on August 27.

Rank	Heat	Lane	Name	Nationality	Time	Notes
1	6	5	Scott Tucker	United States	49.01	Q
2	4	4	Ian Thorpe	Australia	49.59	Q
3	6	6	Brent Hayden	Canada	49.76	Q
4	6	3	Todd Pearson	Australia	49.88	Q
5	4	3	Yannick Lupien	Canada	50.17	Q
6	4	5	Nate Dusing	United States	50.24	Q
7	4	2	Adam Pine	Australia	50.37	Q
8	5	2	Daisuke Hosokawa	Japan	50.65	Q
9	4	6	Thomas Hannan	United States	50.72	Q
10	3	1	Brett Hawke	Australia	50.89	Q
11	4	8	Riley Janes	Canada	50.91	Q
12	5	5	Ashley Callus	Australia	50.93	Q
13	4	1	Naoki Nagura	Japan	50.94	Q
14	3	2	André Cordeiro	Brazil	50.98	Q
15	6	8	Geoff Huegill	Australia	51.03	Q
16	6	1	Guilherme Roth	Brazil	51.05	Q
17	3	5	Renato Gueraldi	Brazil	51.07	
18	5	1	Yoshihiro Okumura	Japan	51.12	
18	6	7	Leon Dunne	Australia	51.12	
20	5	3	Randall Bal	United States	51.19	
21	2	3	Nicholas Santos	Brazil	51.21	
22	5	4	Jason Lezak	United States	51.23	
23	5	7	Issei Nakanishi	Japan	51.35	
24	3	4	Jason Cram	Australia	51.38	
24	5	6	Hiroaki Akebe	Japan	51.38	
26	4	7	Richard Bera	Indonesia	51.45	
27	3	8	Mark Herring	New Zealand	51.96	
28	3	7	Rafael Mosca	Brazil	52.09	
29	2	6	Tan Lee Yu Gary	Singapore	52.46	
30	2	5	Carl Probert	Fiji	52.49	
31	5	8	Ravil Nachaev	Uzbekistan	53.01	
32	3	6	Jun Mark Chay Jung	Singapore	53.14	
33	2	2	Kenneth Kin Lun Doo	Hong Kong	53.18	
34	2	4	Alexandre Pereira	Brazil	53.94	
35	2	1	Wing Harbeth Fu	Hong Kong	54.13	
36	1	4	Kwok Kei Wong	Hong Kong	55.63	
37	1	5	Dean Palacios	Northern Mariana Islands	57.01	
38	1	3	Kin Duenas	Guam	58.80	
-	2	7	Craig Stevens	Australia	DNS	
-	3	3	Mark Johnston	Canada	DNS	
-	6	2	Richard Say	Canada	DNS	
-	6	4	Anthony Ervin	United States	DNS	

=== Semifinals ===
The semifinals were held on August 27.

Rank	Heat	Lane	Name	Nationality	Time	Notes
1	2	4	Scott Tucker	United States	49.20	Q
2	1	4	Ian Thorpe	Australia	49.24	Q
3	2	7	Ashley Callus	Australia	49.61	Q
4	2	5	Brent Hayden	Canada	49.70	Q
5	1	5	Todd Pearson	Australia	49.95	Q
6	2	3	Yannick Lupien	Canada	50.08	Q
7	1	3	Nate Dusing	United States	50.28	Q
8	2	6	Daisuke Hosokawa	Japan	50.45	Q
9	1	2	Riley Janes	Canada	50.63	
10	1	6	Thomas Hannan	United States	50.64	
11	1	8	Yoshihiro Okumura	Japan	50.92	
12	1	1	Guilherme Roth	Brazil	51.00	
13	2	1	André Cordeiro	Brazil	51.02	
14	2	8	Renato Gueraldi	Brazil	51.27	
15	2	2	Brett Hawke	Australia	51.73	
-	1	7	Naoki Nagura	Japan	DSQ	

=== Final ===
The final was held on August 28.

Rank	Lane	Name	Nationality	Time	Notes
1st place, gold medalist(s)	5	Ian Thorpe	Australia	48.84	
2nd place, silver medalist(s)	3	Ashley Callus	Australia	49.26	
3rd place, bronze medalist(s)	7	Nate Dusing	United States	49.47	
4	6	Brent Hayden	Canada	49.53	
5	4	Scott Tucker	United States	49.56	
6	2	Yannick Lupien	Canada	49.99	
7	1	Daisuke Hosokawa	Japan	50.71	
8	8	Yoshihiro Okumura	Japan	50.73	
