= Swimming at the 2004 Summer Olympics – Men's 4 × 200 metre freestyle relay =

Men's 4 × 200 metre freestyle relay at the Games of the XXVIII Olympiad
- Venue: Olympic Aquatic Centre
- Dates: August 17, 2004 (heats & final)
- Competitors: 75 from 16 nations
- Teams: 16
- Winning time: 7:07.33 AM

Medalists
1st place, gold medalist(s)		Michael Phelps, Ryan Lochte, Peter Vanderkaay, Klete Keller, Scott Goldblatt*, Dan Ketchum*	United States
2nd place, silver medalist(s)		Grant Hackett, Michael Klim, Nicholas Sprenger, Ian Thorpe, Antony Matkovich*, Todd Pearson*, Craig Stevens*	Australia
3rd place, bronze medalist(s)		Emiliano Brembilla, Massimiliano Rosolino, Simone Cercato, Filippo Magnini, Federico Cappellazzo*, Matteo Pelliciari*; *Indicates the swimmer only competed in the preliminary heats.	Italy

The men's 4 × 200 metre freestyle relay took place on 17 August at the Olympic Aquatic Centre of the Athens Olympic Sports Complex in Athens, Greece.

Team USA had a satisfactory triumph over the Australians with a gold medal for the first time since the 1996 Summer Olympics in Atlanta, Georgia. Klete Keller, Michael Phelps, Ryan Lochte, and Peter Vanderkaay of Team USA, upset the Australians, led by Ian Thorpe and unbeaten in six years, to a first-place finish by 0.13 of a second, in an American record time of 7:07.33. As the defending Olympic champions from Sydney, the Australian team of Thorpe, Michael Klim, Nicholas Sprenger, and Grant Hackett earned a silver medal in 7:07.46. The Italians got the bronze in 7:11.83, after a powerful second leg from former Olympic silver medalist Massimiliano Rosolino.

== Records ==
Prior to this competition, the existing world and Olympic records were as follows.

World record	Australia (AUS); Grant Hackett (1:46.11); Michael Klim (1:46.49); Bill Kirby (1:47.92); Ian Thorpe (1:44.14)	7:04.66	Fukuoka, Japan	27 July 2001
Olympic record	Australia; Ian Thorpe (1:46.03); Michael Klim (1:46.40); Todd Pearson (1:47.36); Bill Kirby (1:47.26)	7:07.05	Sydney, Australia	19 September 2000

== Results ==
=== Heats ===
Rank	Heat	Lane	Nation	Swimmers	Time	Notes
1	1	4	United States	Scott Goldblatt (1:49.53); Ryan Lochte (1:47.39); Dan Ketchum (1:48.10); Peter Vanderkaay (1:47.78)	7:12.80	Q
2	2	4	Australia	Todd Pearson (1:49.09); Antony Matkovich (1:49.34); Nicholas Sprenger (1:47.73); Craig Stevens (1:48.69)	7:14.85	Q
3	1	5	Germany	Johannes Österling (1:50.37); Stefan Herbst (1:48.92); Heiko Hell (1:48.66); Christian Keller (1:48.80)	7:16.75	Q
4	2	6	Great Britain	Simon Burnett (1:50.43); Ross Davenport (1:49.24); Gavin Meadows (1:48.46); David Carry (1:49.28)	7:17.41	Q
5	1	3	Canada	Mark Johnston (1:50.87); Andrew Hurd (1:48.86); Brian Johns (1:48.73); Rick Say (1:49.59)	7:18.05	Q
6	2	5	Italy	Matteo Pelliciari (1:50.63); Simone Cercato (1:49.08); Federico Cappellazzo (1:50.08); Massimiliano Rosolino (1:48.47)	7:18.26	Q
7	2	2	Greece	Andreas Zisimos (1:50.99); Dimitrios Manganas (1:50.21); Apostolos Antonopoulos (1:48.58); Nikolaos Xylouris (1:49.93)	7:19.71	Q
8	1	6	France	Amaury Leveaux (1:49.65); Fabien Horth (1:49.64); Nicolas Kintz (1:50.36); Nicolas Rostoucher (1:51.66)	7:21.31	Q
9	2	7	Brazil	Rodrigo Castro (1:50.67); Bruno Bonfim (1:51.45); Carlos Jayme (1:51.46); Rafael Mosca (1:49.12)	7:22.70	
10	1	2	China	Liu Yu (1:51.36); Chen Zuo (1:49.79); Zheng Kunliang (1:51.34); Huang Shaohua (1:50.38)	7:22.87	
11	2	3	Russia	Maksim Kuznetsov (1:50.81); Alexei Zatsepine (1:51.75); Stepan Ganzey (1:50.18); Yevgeniy Natsvin (1:51.23)	7:23.97	
12	1	7	Ukraine	Sergey Fesenko (1:50.86); Maksym Kokosha (1:52.03); Dmytro Vereitinov (1:50.34); Sergiy Advena (1:50.90)	7:24.13	
13	2	1	Czech Republic	Michal Rubáček (1:51.37); Květoslav Svoboda (1:49.25); Josef Horký (1:53.29); Martin Škacha (1:52.35)	7:26.26	
14	1	8	Portugal	Luís Monteiro (1:50.43); Adriano Niz (1:52.35); João Araújo (1:54.50); Miguel Pires (1:50.71)	7:27.99	NR
15	1	1	Mexico	Joshua Ilika Brenner (1:51.01) NR; Alejandro Siqueiros (1:52.51); Javier Díaz (1:53.34); Leonardo Salinas Saldana (1:52.68)	7:29.54	NR
16	2	8	Hungary	Tamás Kerékjártó (1:52.65); Balázs Gercsák (1:54.03); Balázs Makány (1:52.75); Tamás Szűcs (1:52.35)	7:31.78	

=== Final ===
Rank	Lane	Nation	Swimmers	Time	Time behind	Notes
1st place, gold medalist(s)	4	United States	Michael Phelps (1:46.49); Ryan Lochte (1:47.52); Peter Vanderkaay (1:47.79); Klete Keller (1:45.53)	7:07.33		AM
2nd place, silver medalist(s)	5	Australia	Grant Hackett (1:47.50); Michael Klim (1:47.62); Nicholas Sprenger (1:48.16); Ian Thorpe (1:44.18)	7:07.46	0.13	
3rd place, bronze medalist(s)	7	Italy	Emiliano Brembilla (1:48.16); Massimiliano Rosolino (1:46.24); Simone Cercato (1:49.85); Filippo Magnini (1:47.58)	7:11.83	4.50	
4	6	Great Britain	Simon Burnett (1:47.90); Gavin Meadows (1:48.46); David O'Brien (1:49.05); Ross Davenport (1:47.19)	7:12.60	5.27	
5	2	Canada	Brent Hayden (1:49.08); Brian Johns (1:49.15); Andrew Hurd (1:48.09); Rick Say (1:47.01)	7:13.33	6.00	
6	3	Germany	Jens Schreiber (1:49.08); Heiko Hell (1:49.15); Lars Conrad (1:48.23); Christian Keller (1:50.05)	7:16.51	9.18	
7	8	France	Amaury Leveaux (1:48.57); Fabien Horth (1:48.67); Nicolas Kintz (1:50.01); Nicolas Rostoucher (1:50.18)	7:17.43	10.10	
8	1	Greece	Apostolos Antonopoulos (1:50.34); Dimitrios Manganas (1:51.33); Andreas Zisimos (1:50.26); Nikolaos Xylouris (1:51.09)	7:23.02	15.67	
