= 2002 Pan Pacific Swimming Championships – Men's 200 metre freestyle =

Men's 200 metre freestyle at the 2002 Pan Pacific Swimming Championships
- Venue: Yokohama International Swimming Pool
- Dates: August 25, 2002 (heats & semifinals); August 26, 2002 (final)
- Competitors: 29 from 10 nations
- Winning time: 1:44.75

Medalists
gold medal	Ian Thorpe	Australia
silver medal	Grant Hackett	Australia
bronze medal	Nate Dusing	United States

The men's 200 metre freestyle competition at the 2002 Pan Pacific Swimming Championships took place on August 25–26 at the Yokohama International Swimming Pool. The last champion was Ian Thorpe of Australia.

This race consisted of four lengths of the pool, all in freestyle.

== Records ==
Prior to this competition, the existing world and Pan Pacific records were as follows:

World record	Ian Thorpe (AUS)	1:44.06	Fukuoka, Japan	July 25, 2001
Pan Pacific Championships record	Ian Thorpe (AUS)	1:46.00	Sydney, Australia	August 24, 1999

== Results ==
All times are in minutes and seconds.

KEY:	q	Fastest non-qualifiers	Q	Qualified	CR	Championships record	NR	National record	PB	Personal best	SB	Seasonal best

=== Heats ===
The first round was held on August 25.

Rank	Heat	Lane	Name	Nationality	Time	Notes
1	4	4	Ian Thorpe	Australia	1:48.51	Q
2	4	5	Klete Keller	United States	1:49.10	Q
3	2	5	Mark Johnston	Canada	1:49.46	Q
4	3	4	Grant Hackett	Australia	1:49.48	Q
5	2	4	Nate Dusing	United States	1:49.58	Q
6	2	2	Craig Stevens	Australia	1:49.84	Q
7	3	5	Richard Say	Canada	1:49.85	Q
8	2	3	Daisuke Hosokawa	Japan	1:49.91	Q
9	4	3	Chad Carvin	United States	1:50.12	Q
10	2	6	Jason Cram	Australia	1:50.40	Q
11	3	2	Brent Hayden	Canada	1:50.83	Q
12	4	6	Yosuke Ichikawa	Japan	1:50.95	Q
13	3	6	Yoshihiro Okumura	Japan	1:51.11	Q
14	3	7	Rafael Mosca	Brazil	1:51.23	Q
15	3	3	Scott Tucker	United States	1:51.75	Q
16	3	1	Robert van der Zant	Australia	1:52.33	Q
17	4	2	Leon Dunne	Australia	1:52.50	
18	2	1	Bruno Bonfim	Brazil	1:52.89	
19	3	8	André Cordeiro	Brazil	1:53.20	
20	4	1	Mark Kin Ming Kwok	Hong Kong	1:54.89	
20	4	7	Hiroaki Akebe	Japan	1:54.89	
22	2	8	Moss Burmester	New Zealand	1:54.92	
23	2	7	Jun Mark Chay Jung	Singapore	1:55.02	
24	1	4	Tan Lee Yu Gary	Singapore	1:55.07	
25	4	8	Alexandre Pereira	Brazil	1:58.37	
26	1	5	Shui Ki Szeto	Hong Kong	1:59.11	
27	1	3	Hok Him Fung	Hong Kong	1:59.50	
28	1	6	Dean Palacios	Northern Mariana Islands	2:06.37	
29	1	2	Kin Duenas	Guam	2:12.03	

=== Semifinals ===
The semifinals were held on August 25.

Rank	Heat	Lane	Name	Nationality	Time	Notes
1	2	4	Ian Thorpe	Australia	1:47.57	Q
2	1	5	Grant Hackett	Australia	1:48.41	Q
3	1	4	Klete Keller	United States	1:48.52	Q
4	2	3	Nate Dusing	United States	1:48.59	Q
5	1	3	Richard Say	Canada	1:48.89	Q
6	2	5	Mark Johnston	Canada	1:49.13	Q
7	1	2	Brent Hayden	Canada	1:49.83	Q
8	1	6	Chad Carvin	United States	1:49.98	Q
9	1	1	Scott Tucker	United States	1:50.03	
10	2	6	Daisuke Hosokawa	Japan	1:50.12	
11	1	7	Yoshihiro Okumura	Japan	1:50.42	
12	2	2	Jason Cram	Australia	1:50.93	
13	2	7	Yosuke Ichikawa	Japan	1:51.17	
14	2	1	Rafael Mosca	Brazil	1:51.47	
15	2	8	Leon Dunne	Australia	1:51.61	
16	1	8	Bruno Bonfim	Brazil	1:53.70	

=== Final ===
The final was held on August 26.

Rank	Lane	Name	Nationality	Time	Notes
1st place, gold medalist(s)	4	Ian Thorpe	Australia	1:44.75	CR
2nd place, silver medalist(s)	5	Grant Hackett	Australia	1:45.84	
3rd place, bronze medalist(s)	6	Nate Dusing	United States	1:48.11	
4	2	Richard Say	Canada	1:48.26	
5	3	Klete Keller	United States	1:48.42	
6	7	Mark Johnston	Canada	1:49.48	
7	1	Daisuke Hosokawa	Japan	1:49.74	
8	8	Yoshihiro Okumura	Japan	1:49.97	
