= 2003 Mutual of Omaha Duel in the Pool =

The inaugural edition of the Mutual of Omaha Duel in the Pool took place on April 6, 2003, at the Indiana University Natatorium on the campus of IUPUI in Indianapolis. The event pitted the United States' top swimmers against those of Australia.

The event featured 26 races — four relay events and 22 individual races — in an Olympic-sized pool. There were 270 total points up for grabs in the event, with the U.S. beating Australia in the end 196–74.

The event was broadcast in the United States by the NBC television network, who taped the event, then showed it over two days the next weekend on April 12 and April 13, 2003. Ted Robinson handled stroke-by-stroke duties, with Rowdy Gaines as the analyst. Craig Hummer was the poolside reporter and interviewer.

== Event summary ==
The Australian team had many noticeable absences:

- Ian Thorpe withdrew due to a serious illness;
- Jodie Henry withdrew due to terrorism fears, as this was one of the first major international sporting events held on the heels of the beginning of the war in Iraq;
- other notable missing Aussies were Michael Klim, Petria Thomas, Geoff Huegill, Giaan Rooney, Leisel Jones, and Ashley Callus.

Of the 26 events held, the U.S. won 21.

== Results ==
Events are listed in chronological order.

| Event | First place | Pt | Time | Second place | Pt | Time | Third place | Pt | Time | Fourth place | Pt | Time |
|---|---|---|---|---|---|---|---|---|---|---|---|---|
| Women's 4 × 100 m Free Relay | Lindsay Benko; Natalie Coughlin; Rhi Jeffrey; Jenny Thompson; USA | 7 | 3:38.95 USOR | Alice Mills; Libby Lenton; Sarah Ryan; Elka Graham; Australia | 0 | 3:39.13 | | | | | | |
| Men's 4 × 100 m Free Relay | Scott Tucker; Nate Dusing; Jason Lezak; Neil Walker; USA | 7 | 3:14.20 USOR | Casey Flouch; Antony Matkovich; Jason Cram; Adam Pine; Australia | 0 | 3:18.62 | | | | | | |
| Women's 400 m Individual Medley | Kaitlin Sandeno; USA | 5 | 4:41.89 | Jennifer Reilly; Australia | 3 | 4:42.94 | Maggie Bowen; USA | 2 | 4:44.75 | Maddy Crippen; USA | 1 | 4:50.37 |
| Men's 400 m Individual Medley | Michael Phelps; USA | 5 | 4:10.73 WR | Tom Wilkens; USA | 3 | 4:16.75 | Erik Vendt; USA | 2 | 4:17.48 | Justin Norris; Australia | 1 | 4:19.05 |
| Women's 100 m Back | Natalie Coughlin; USA | 5 | 1:00.74 | Haley Cope; USA | 3 | 1:01.65 | Margaret Hoelzer; USA | 2 | 1:02.53 | Giaan Rooney; Australia | 1 | 1:03.08 |
| Men's 100 m Back | Matt Welsh; Australia | 5 | 53.89 | Lenny Krayzelburg; USA | 3 | 54.00 | Aaron Peirsol; USA | 2 | 54.09 | Randall Bal; USA | 1 | 55.02 |
| Women's 100 m Breast | Amanda Beard; USA | 5 | 1:08.17 | Brooke Hanson; Australia | 3 | 1:08.62 | Tara Kirk; USA | 2 | 1:08.90 | Sarah Katsoulis; Australia | 1 | 1:08.91 |
| Men's 100 m Breast | Ed Moses; USA | 5 | 1:00.29 | Brendan Hansen; USA | 3 | 1:00.49 | Jim Piper; Australia | 2 | 1:01.97 | David Denniston; USA | 1 | 1:02.44 |
| Women's 100 m Free | Libby Lenton; Australia | 5 | 54.71 | Jenny Thompson; USA | 3 | 55.00 | Alice Mills; Australia | 2 | 55.53 | Kara Lynn Joyce; USA | 1 | 55.56 |
| Men's 100 m Free | Neil Walker; USA | 5 | 49.10 | Todd Pearson; Australia | 3 | 49.70 | Scott Tucker; USA | 2 | 49.71 | Ryan Wochomurka; USA | 1 | 50.26 |
| Women's 100 m Fly | Natalie Coughlin; USA | 5 | 58.70 | Mary DeScenza; USA | 3 | 59.04 | Jessicah Schipper; Australia | 2 | 59.76 | Emily Goetsch; USA | 1 | 59.78 |
| Men's 100 m Fly | Michael Phelps; USA | 5 | 51.84 USOR | Ian Crocker; USA | 3 | 52.49 | Ben Michaelson; USA | 2 | 52.76 | Adam Pine; Australia | 1 | 53.47 |
| Women's 800 m Free | Diana Munz; USA | 5 | 8:34.45 | Hayley Peirsol; USA | 3 | 8:36.27 | Amanda Pascoe; Australia | 2 | 8:37.52 | Adrienne Binder; USA | 1 | 8:44.11 |
| Women's 200 m Back | Margaret Hoelzer; USA | 5 | 2:10.88 | Melissa Morgan; Australia | 3 | 2:12.49 | Jamie Reid; USA | 2 | 2:13.55 | Carmen Retrum; USA | 1 | 2:15.02 |
| Men's 200 m Back | Aaron Peirsol; USA | 5 | 1:57.13 | Lenny Krayzelburg; USA | 3 | 1:58.46 | Matt Welsh; Australia | 2 | 1:58.96 | Bryce Hunt; USA | 1 | 1:59.61 |
| Women's 200 m Breast | Amanda Beard; USA | 5 | 2:25.77 | Brooke Hanson; Australia | 3 | 2:30.44 | Kristy Kowal; USA | 2 | 2:30.98 | Sarah Kaslouis; Australia | 1 | 2:32.28 |
| Men's 200 m Breast | Ed Moses; USA | 5 | 2:10.49 | Jim Piper; Australia | 3 | 2:12.02 | Brendan Hansen; USA | 2 | 2:12.57 | Regan Harrison; Australia | 1 | 2:14.5 |
| Women's 50 m Free | Kara Lynn Joyce; USA | 5 | 25.14 | Jenny Thompson; USA | 3 | 25.18 | Maritza Correia; USA | 2 | 25.36 | Alice Mills; Australia | 1 | 25.39 |
| Men's 50 m Free | Jason Lezak; USA | 5 | 22.26 | Brett Hawke; Australia | 3 | 22.47 | Neil Walker; USA | 2 | 22.53 | Anthony Ervin; USA | 1 | 22.54 |
| Women's 200 m Free | Lindsay Benko; USA | 5 | 1:59.17 | Elka Graham; Australia | 3 | 1:59.36 | Elizabeth Hill; USA | 2 | 2:00.54 | Rhi Jeffrey; USA | 1 | 2:01.94 |
| Men's 200 m Free | Grant Hackett; Australia | 5 | 1:46.64 AR | Klete Keller; USA | 3 | 1:47.08 USOR | Antony Matkovich; Australia | 2 | 1:49.18 | Scott Goldblatt; USA | 1 | 1:49.38 |
| Women's 200 m Fly | Kaitlin Sandeno; USA | 5 | 2:10.69 | Mary DeScenza; USA | 3 | 2:10.77 | Emily Mason; USA | 2 | 2:11.67 | Felicity Galvez; Australia | 1 | 2:12.27 |
| Men's 200 m Fly | Michael Phelps; USA | 5 | 1:55.17 | Tom Malchow; USA | 3 | 1:55.24 | Michael Raab; USA | 2 | 1:58.29 | Justin Norris; Australia | 1 | 1:58.50 |
| Men's 1500 m Free | Grant Hackett; Australia | 5 | 14:48.34 AR | Larsen Jensen; USA | 3 | 15:00.81 | Craig Stevens; Australia | 2 | 15:19.19 | Chris Thompson; USA | 1 | 15:20.82 |
| Women's 4 × 100 m Medley Relay | Giaan Rooney; Brooke Hanson; Jessicah Schipper; Libby Lenton; Australia | 7 | 4:05.25 | Natalie Coughlin; Amanda Beard; Mary DeScenza; Lindsay Benko; USA | 0 | DQ | | | | | | |
| Men's 4 × 100 m Medley Relay | Aaron Peirsol; Ed Moses; Michael Phelps; Neil Walker; USA | 7 | 3:34.24 USOR | Matt Welsh; Jim Piper; Adam Pine; Todd Pearson; Australia | 0 | DQ | | | | | | |

WR=World Record; USOR=U.S. Open Record; AR=American Record

Phelps' world record in the 400 IM, the only one set that day, earned him a $25,000 bonus.

Reasons for DQs:

- Libby Lenton had originally placed first in the Women's 50 m Free, but was stripped of the win because the judges said she false-started. A videotape review of the start, though, appeared to show that she didn't false-start; however, because FINA does not allow tape reviews, the DQ stood, though a FINA Technical Committee member told Lenton her race time would stand as an Australian record.
