= 2002 Pan Pacific Swimming Championships – Men's 4 × 200 metre freestyle relay =

Men's 4 × 200 metre freestyle relay at the 2002 Pan Pacific Swimming Championships
- Venue: Yokohama International Swimming Pool
- Dates: August 27, 2002 (heats & finals)
- Winning time: 7:09.00

Medalists
| gold medal | Grant Hackett, Craig Stevens, Jason Cram and Ian Thorpe | Australia |
| silver medal | Nate Dusing, Klete Keller, Michael Phelps and Chad Carvin | United States |
| bronze medal | Rick Say, Mike Mintenko, Mark Johnston and Brian Johns | Canada |

Swimming Competition at the 2002 Pan Pacific Swimming Championships took place on August 27 at the Yokohama International Swimming Pool. The last champion was Australia.

This race consisted of sixteen lengths of the pool. Each of the four racercompleted four lengths of the pool. The first swimmer had to touch the wall before the second could leave the starting block.

== Records ==
Prior to this competition, the existing world and Pan Pacific records were as follows:

| World record | Australia (AUS); Grant Hackett (1:46.11); Michael Klim (1:46.49); Bill Kirby (1:47.92); Ian Thorpe (1:44.14) | 7:04.66 | Fukuoka, Japan | July 27, 2001 |
| Pan Pacific Championships record | Australia (AUS); Ian Thorpe (1:46.28); Bill Kirby (1:48.96); Grant Hackett (1:46.30); Michael Klim (1:47.25) | 7:08.79 | Sydney, Australia | August 25, 1999 |

== Results ==
All times are in minutes and seconds.

| KEY: | q | Fastest non-qualifiers | Q | Qualified | CR | Championships record | NR | National record | PB | Personal best | SB | Seasonal best |

=== Heats ===
Heats weren't performed, as only six teams had entered.

=== Final ===
The final was held on August 27.

| Rank | Lane | Name | Nationality | Time | Notes |
|---|---|---|---|---|---|
| 1st place, gold medalist(s) | 4 | Grant Hackett (1:46.60); Craig Stevens (1:48.35); Jason Cram (1:49.25); Ian Thorpe (1:44.80) | Australia | 7:09.00 | |
| 2nd place, silver medalist(s) | 5 | Nate Dusing (1:49.00); Klete Keller (1:47.31); Michael Phelps (1:47.49); Chad Carvin (1:48.01) | United States | 7:11.81 | |
| 3rd place, bronze medalist(s) | 3 | Rick Say (1:49.71); Mike Mintenko (1:49.37); Mark Johnston (1:49.41); Brian Johns (1:48.81) | Canada | 7:17.30 | |
| 4 | 6 | Yosuke Ichikawa (1:51.67); Yoshihiro Okumura (1:50.24); Shunichi Fujita (1:49.96); Daisuke Hosokawa (1:50.45) | Japan | 7:22.32 | |
| 5 | 2 | Bruno Bonfim (1:52.49); Rafael Mosca (1:53.22); Alexandre Pereira (1:59.09); André Cordeiro (1:56.86) | Brazil | 7:41.66 | |
| 6 | 7 | Mark Kin Ming Kwok (1:54.19); Hok Him Fung (2:00.25); Shui Ki Szeto (1:57.14); Kwok Leung Chung (1:56.87) | Hong Kong | 7:48.45 | |
| - | 1 | - - - - | Singapore | DNS | |
