= Swimming at the 2004 Summer Olympics – Men's 4 × 100 metre freestyle relay =

Men's 4 × 100 metre freestyle relay at the Games of the XXVIII Olympiad
- Venue: Olympic Aquatic Centre
- Dates: August 15, 2004 (heats & final)
- Competitors: 75 from 16 nations
- Teams: 16
- Winning time: 3:13.17 WR

Medalists
| 1st place, gold medalist(s) | | Roland Schoeman, Lyndon Ferns, Darian Townsend, Ryk Neethling | South Africa |
| 2nd place, silver medalist(s) | | Johan Kenkhuis, Mitja Zastrow, Klaas-Erik Zwering, Pieter van den Hoogenband, Mark Veens* | Netherlands |
| 3rd place, bronze medalist(s) | | United States; Ian Crocker, Michael Phelps, Neil Walker, Jason Lezak, Nate Dusing*, Gary Hall Jr.*, Gabe Woodward*; *Indicates the swimmer only competed in the preliminary heats. | United States |

The men's 4 × 100 metre freestyle relay took place on 15 August at the Olympic Aquatic Centre of the Athens Olympic Sports Complex in Athens, Greece.

The South African team (Roland Schoeman, Lyndon Ferns, Darian Townsend, and Ryk Neethling) set a new world record of 3:13.17 to solidify their country's triumph with a gold medal in the event. Defending Olympic champion Pieter van den Hoogenband swam a fastest split of 46.79 to take the silver for the Dutch in a national record of 3:14.36, leaving the U.S. team of Ian Crocker, Michael Phelps, Neil Walker, and Jason Lezak with the bronze in 3:14.62, their worst result in Olympic history.

== Records ==
Prior to this competition, the existing world and Olympic records were as follows.

| World record | Australia; Michael Klim (48.18); Chris Fydler (48.48); Ashley Callus (48.71); Ian Thorpe (48.30) | 3:13.67 | Sydney, Australia | 17 September 2000 |
| Olympic record | Australia; Michael Klim (48.18); Chris Fydler (48.48); Ashley Callus (48.71); Ian Thorpe (48.30) | 3:13.67 | Sydney, Australia | 17 September 2000 |

The following new world and Olympic records were set during this competition.

| Date | Event | Name | Nationality | Time | Record |
|---|---|---|---|---|---|
| August 15 | Final | Roland Schoeman (48.17); Lyndon Ferns (48.13); Darian Townsend (48.96); Ryk Neethling (47.91) | South Africa | 3:13.17 | WR |

== Results ==
=== Heats ===
| Rank | Heat | Lane | Nation | Swimmers | Time | Notes |
|---|---|---|---|---|---|---|
| 1 | 1 | 6 | South Africa | Roland Schoeman (48.38); Lyndon Ferns (48.34); Darian Townsend (49.13); Ryk Neethling (47.99) | 3:13.84 | Q, AF |
| 2 | 1 | 4 | United States | Gabe Woodward (49.93); Nate Dusing (49.01); Neil Walker (48.16); Gary Hall Jr. (48.73) | 3:15.83 | Q |
| 3 | 1 | 5 | Italy | Lorenzo Vismara (49.67); Michele Scarica (48.92); Alessandro Calvi (49.35); Christian Galenda (48.24) | 3:16.18 | Q |
| 4 | 1 | 2 | Netherlands | Mark Veens (49.73); Johan Kenkhuis (48.80); Mitja Zastrow (48.90); Klaas-Erik Zwering (48.99) | 3:16.42 | Q |
| 5 | 2 | 4 | Russia | Andrey Kapralov (49.12); Yevgeny Lagunov (49.68); Ivan Usov (49.86); Denis Pimankov (48.80) | 3:17.46 | Q |
| 6 | 2 | 3 | Australia | Ashley Callus (50.04); Eamon Sullivan (49.13); Jono van Hazel (49.65); Todd Pearson (48.82) | 3:17.64 | Q |
| 6 | 2 | 5 | France | Romain Barnier (49.73); Julien Sicot (49.29); Fabien Gilot (49.21); Amaury Leveaux (49.41) | 3:17.64 | Q |
| 8 | 1 | 3 | Germany | Stephan Kunzelmann (50.09); Christian Keller (50.16); Torsten Spanneberg (49.36); Lars Conrad (48.36) | 3:17.97 | Q |
| 9 | 2 | 6 | Canada | Yannick Lupien (50.16); Riley Janes (49.49); Mike Mintenko (49.60); Brent Hayden (49.10) | 3:18.35 | |
| 10 | 2 | 1 | Ukraine | Denys Syzonenko (50.05); Andriy Serdinov (49.94); Pavel Khnykin (49.47); Yuriy Yegoshin (49.49) | 3:18.95 | NR |
| 11 | 1 | 8 | Lithuania | Rolandas Gimbutis (49.11); Saulius Binevičius (50.35); Paulius Viktoravičius (50.20); Vytautas Janušaitis (49.62) | 3:19.28 | |
| 12 | 2 | 7 | Brazil | Jader Souza (50.89); Gustavo Borges (49.59); Carlos Jayme (49.67); Rodrigo Castro (50.05) | 3:20.20 | |
| 13 | 1 | 1 | Croatia | Duje Draganja (50.38); Mario Delač (49.75); Ivan Mladina (50.16); Igor Čerenšek (50.72) | 3:21.01 | |
| 14 | 2 | 8 | Greece | Aristeidis Grigoriadis (50.15); Alexandros Tsoltos (51.03); Spyridon Bitsakis (52.25); Andreas Zisimos (50.83) | 3:24.26 | |
| 15 | 1 | 7 | China | Chen Zuo (50.75); Liu Weijia (51.15); Zheng Kunliang (51.34); Huang Shaohua (51.07) | 3:24.31 | |
| | 2 | 2 | Sweden | Eric la Fleur (50.43); Stefan Nystrand (48.61); Mattias Ohlin (50.24); Lars Frölander | DSQ | |

=== Final ===
| Rank | Lane | Nation | Swimmers | Time | Time behind | Notes |
|---|---|---|---|---|---|---|
| 1st place, gold medalist(s) | 4 | South Africa | Roland Schoeman (48.17) AF; Lyndon Ferns (48.13); Darian Townsend (48.96); Ryk Neethling (47.91) | 3:13.17 | | WR |
| 2nd place, silver medalist(s) | 6 | Netherlands | Johan Kenkhuis (49.81); Mitja Zastrow (49.25); Klaas-Erik Zwering (48.51); Pieter van den Hoogenband (46.79) | 3:14.36 | 1.19 | NR |
| 3rd place, bronze medalist(s) | 5 | United States | Ian Crocker (50.05); Michael Phelps (48.74); Neil Walker (47.97); Jason Lezak (47.86) | 3:14.62 | 1.45 | |
| 4 | 2 | Russia | Andrey Kapralov (49.27); Yevgeny Lagunov (49.17); Denis Pimankov (49.25); Alexander Popov (48.06) | 3:15.75 | 2.68 | |
| 4 | 3 | Italy | Lorenzo Vismara (49.16); Filippo Magnini (48.30); Michele Scarica (49.21); Christian Galenda (49.08) | 3:15.75 | 2.68 | |
| 6 | 1 | Australia | Michael Klim (49.37); Todd Pearson (49.07); Eamon Sullivan (49.19); Ian Thorpe (48.14) | 3:15.77 | 2.70 | |
| 7 | 7 | France | Romain Barnier (49.65); Julien Sicot (49.31); Fabien Gilot (48.95); Frédérick Bousquet (48.32) | 3:16.23 | 3.06 | |
| 8 | 8 | Germany | Jens Schreiber (49.88); Lars Conrad (48.72); Torsten Spanneberg (49.24); Stefan Herbst (49.34) | 3:17.18 | 4.01 | |
