= Swimming at the 2002 Commonwealth Games – Men's 400 metre freestyle =

Men's 400 metre freestyle at the 2002 Commonwealth Games
- Venue: Manchester Aquatics Centre
- Dates: 30 July 2002
- Competitors: 18 from 11 nations
- Winning time: 3:40.08

Medalists
gold medal	Ian Thorpe	Australia
silver medal	Grant Hackett	Australia
bronze medal	Graeme Smith	Scotland

The men's 400 metre freestyle event at the 2002 Commonwealth Games was held on 30 July at the Manchester Aquatics Centre.

== Records ==
Prior to this competition, the existing records were as follows:

Record	Time	Athlete (nation)	Meet	Location	Date	Ref
World record	3:40.17	Ian Thorpe (AUS)		Fukuoka, Japan	22 July 2001	
Commonwealth record	3:40.17	Ian Thorpe (AUS)		Fukuoka, Japan	22 July 2001	
Games record	3:44.35	Ian Thorpe (AUS)		Kuala Lumpur, Malaysia	15 September 1998	

The following records were established during the competition:

Date	Event	Name	Nationality	Time	Record
30 July	Final	Ian Thorpe	Australia	3:40.08	WR

== Results ==
=== Heats ===
Rank	Heat	Lane	Name	Nationality	Time	Notes
1	3	4	Ian Thorpe	Australia	3:47.24	Q
2	2	4	Grant Hackett	Australia	3:49.13	Q
3	1	4	Graeme Smith	Scotland	3:50.19	Q
4	1	3	Adam Faulkner	England	3:52.39	Q
5	3	5	Craig Stevens	Australia	3:52.78	Q
6	2	5	James Salter	England	3:53.89	Q
7	3	3	Mark Johnston	Canada	3:55.15	Q
8	1	5	Rick Say	Canada	3:55.28	Q
9	2	3	Andrew Hurd	Canada	3:55.67	
10	2	6	Stuart Trees	England	3:55.79	
11	3	6	David Davies	Wales	3:56.10	
12	1	6	Andrew Jameson	Scotland	3:56.88	
13	3	2	Damian Alleyne	Barbados	4:06.78	
14	2	2	Jonathon Le Noury	Guernsey	4:18.00	
15	3	7	Barnsley Albert	Seychelles	4:23.59	
16	2	7	Colin Bensadon	Gibraltar	4:27.73	
17	1	7	Kpiliboh Otiko	Nigeria	4:54.15	
—	1	2	Alexandros Aresti	Cyprus	DNS	

=== Final ===
Rank	Name	Nationality	Time	Notes
1st place, gold medalist(s)	Ian Thorpe	Australia	3:40.08	WR
2nd place, silver medalist(s)	Grant Hackett	Australia	3:43.48	
3rd place, bronze medalist(s)	Graeme Smith	Scotland	3:49.40	
4	Craig Stevens	Australia	3:49.84	
5	Adam Faulkner	England	3:51.88	
6	James Salter	England	3:53.35	
7	Rick Say	Canada	3:53.55	
8	Mark Johnston	Canada	3:56.25	
