= Jason Cram =

Australian freestyle swimmer

Personal information
- Full name: Jason Cram
- Nationality: Australia
- Born: 21 July 1982 (age 43)
- Height: 1.90 m (6 ft 3 in)
- Weight: 82 kg (181 lb)

Sport
- Sport: Swimming
- Strokes: Freestyle
Medal record
World Championships (LC)
Gold medal – first place	2003 Barcelona	4×200 m freestyle
Pan Pacific Championships
Gold medal – first place	2002 Yokohama	4×200 m freestyle
Commonwealth Games
Gold medal – first place	2002 Manchester	4×200 m freestyle
- Updated on 21 January 2014

Jason Cram (born 21 July 1982) is an Australian freestyle swimmer.

== Career ==
Cram first competed for Australia at the 2002 Commonwealth Games in Manchester where he finished 6th in the 200 metre freestyle in 1:50.30 and with Grant Hackett, Leon Dunne and Ian Thorpe won gold in the 4 × 200 metre freestyle relay in new Games record time of 7:11.69.

At the 2002 Pan Pacific Championships in Yokohama, Japan, Cram finished 12th in the 200 metre freestyle in 1:50.93, equal 24th in the 100 metre freestyle in 51.38 and with Hackett, Thorpe and Craig Stevens won gold in the 4 × 200 metre freestyle relay in 7:09.00.

At the 2003 Duel in the Pool between United States and Australia in Indianapolis, Cram finished 5th in the 100 metre freestyle in 50.29 and with Casey Flouch, Antony Matkovich and Adam Pine finished behind the United States in the 4 × 100 metre freestyle relay in 3:18.62.

At the 2003 World Championships in Barcelona, Cram with Matkovich, Stevens and Nicholas Sprenger finished first in the heats of the 4 × 200 metre freestyle relay in 7:17.68 with Cram swimming the third leg in 1:49.03. In the final, Cram and Matkovich were replaced with Hackett and Thorpe who won gold in 7:08.58.

== See also ==
- List of Commonwealth Games medallists in swimming (men)
