= 2002 Pan Pacific Swimming Championships – Men's 4 × 100 metre freestyle relay =

Men's 4 × 100 metre freestyle relay at the 2002 Pan Pacific Swimming Championships
- Venue: Yokohama International Swimming Pool
- Dates: August 24, 2002 (heats & finals)
- Winning time: 3:15.15

Medalists
gold medal	Ashley Callus, Todd Pearson, Grant Hackett and Ian Thorpe	Australia
silver medal	Anthony Ervin, Scott Tucker, Nate Dusing and Jason Lezak	United States
bronze medal	Yannick Lupien, Mike Mintenko, Rick Say and Brent Hayden	Canada

The men's 4 × 100 metre freestyle relay competition at the 2002 Pan Pacific Swimming Championships took place on August 24 at the Yokohama International Swimming Pool. The last champion was Australia.

This race consisted of eight lengths of the pool. Each of the four swimmers completed two lengths of the pool. The first swimmer had to touch the wall before the second could leave the starting block.

== Records ==
Prior to this competition, the existing world and Pan Pacific records were as follows:

World record	Australia (AUS); Michael Klim (48.18) WR; Chris Fydler (48.48); Ashley Callus (48.71); Ian Thorpe (48.30)	3:13.67	Sydney, Australia	September 16, 2000
Pan Pacific Championships record	United States (USA); David Fox (49.32); Joe Hudepohl (49.11); Jon Olsen (48.17); Gary Hall, Jr. (48.51)	3:15.11	Atlanta, United States	August 12, 1995

== Results ==
All times are in minutes and seconds.

KEY:	q	Fastest non-qualifiers	Q	Qualified	CR	Championships record	NR	National record	PB	Personal best	SB	Seasonal best

=== Heats ===
Heats weren't performed, as only eight teams had entered.

=== Final ===
The final was held on August 24.

Rank	Lane	Name	Nationality	Time	Notes
1st place, gold medalist(s)	4	Ashley Callus (49.26); Todd Pearson (48.92); Grant Hackett (49.05); Ian Thorpe (47.92)	Australia	3:15.15	
2nd place, silver medalist(s)	5	Anthony Ervin (50.30); Scott Tucker (48.66); Nate Dusing (48.53); Jason Lezak (47.92)	United States	3:15.41	
3rd place, bronze medalist(s)	3	Yannick Lupien (49.90); Mike Mintenko (49.66); Rick Say (49.73); Brent Hayden (48.40)	Canada	3:17.69	
4	2	Guilherme Roth (51.17); Renato Gueraldi (50.42); Rafael Mosca (50.96); André Cordeiro (50.34)	Brazil	3:22.89	
5	8	Cameron Gibson (51.65); Mark Herring (52.53); Moss Burmester (53.17); Dean Kent (51.78)	New Zealand	3:29.13	
6	1	Koh Mun Yew Gerald (53.63); Jun Mark Chay Jung (52.09); Tan Lee Yu Gary (51.59); Ng Cheng Xun (55.72)	Singapore	3:33.03	
7	7	Mark Kin Ming Kwok (53.37); Shui Ki Szeto (53.87); Kenneth Kin Lun Doo (52.80); Wing Harbeth Fu (53.45)	Hong Kong	3:33.49	
-	6	Hiroaki Akebe (51.20); Yoshihiro Okumura (50.47); Naoki Nagura (49.98); Daisuke Hosokawa (49.78)	Japan	DSQ	
