= Swimming at the 2002 Commonwealth Games – Men's 4 × 200 metre freestyle relay =

Men's 4 × 200 metre freestyle relay at the 2002 Commonwealth Games
- Venue: Manchester Aquatics Centre
- Dates: 1 August
- Competitors: 20 from 5 nations
- Winning time: 7:11.69

Medalists
gold medal	Grant Hackett, Leon Dunne, Jason Cram, Ian Thorpe	Australia
silver medal	Rick Say, Brian Johns, Mark Johnston, Mike Mintenko	Canada
bronze medal	Adam Faulkner, James Salter, Steve Parry, Simon Burnett	England

The men's 4 × 200 metre freestyle relay event at the 2002 Commonwealth Games as part of the swimming programme took place on 1 August at the Manchester Aquatics Centre in Manchester, England.

== Records ==
Prior to this competition, the existing world and games records were as follows.

World record	Australia; Grant Hackett; Michael Klim; Bill Kirby; Ian Thorpe	7:04.66	Fukuoka, Japan	27 July 2001
Games record	Australia; Ian Thorpe; Daniel Kowalski; Matthew Dunn; Michael Klim	7:11.86	Kuala Lumpur, Malaysia	13 September 1998

== Results ==
The straight final was held on 1 August at 20:52.

Rank	Lane	Nation	Swimmers	Time	Notes
1st place, gold medalist(s)	4	Australia	Grant Hackett; Leon Dunne; Jason Cram; Ian Thorpe	7:11.69	GR
2nd place, silver medalist(s)	5	Canada	Rick Say; Brian Johns; Mark Johnston; Mike Mintenko	7:17.17	
3rd place, bronze medalist(s)	3	England	Adam Faulkner; James Salter; Steve Parry; Simon Burnett	7:22.56	
4	6	Barbados	Damian Alleyne; Terrence Haynes; Andrei Cross; Cliff Gittens	8:02.02	
5	2	Kenya	Kabir Walia; Rama Vyombo; Hamid Nassir; Nicholas Diaper	8:44.71	
