= Leon Dunne =

Australian freestyle swimmer

Personal information
- Full name: Leon Dunne
- Nationality: Australian
- Born: 7 March 1975 (age 51)
- Height: 1.91 m (6 ft 3 in)
- Weight: 86 kg (190 lb)

Sport
- Sport: Swimming
- Strokes: freestyle
Medal record
World Championships (SC)
Gold medal – first place	2002 Moscow	4×200 m freestyle
Commonwealth Games
Gold medal – first place	2002 Manchester	4×100 m freestyle
Gold medal – first place	2002 Manchester	4×200 m freestyle
- Updated on 20 January 2014

Leon Dunne (born 7 March 1975) is an Australian freestyle swimmer.

== Career ==
Dunne first competed for Australia at the 1999 FINA World Swimming Championships (25 m) in Hong Kong where he competed in the 50 metre butterfly.

At the 2002 FINA World Swimming Championships (25 m) in Moscow, Dunne finished 13th in the 200 metre freestyle in 1:47.51 and 27th in the 100 metre individual medley in 56.72. In the relays, Dunne with Antony Matkovich, Robert van der Zant and Todd Pearson finished first in the heats of the 4 × 100 metre freestyle relay in 3:15.32 with Dunne swimming the opening leg in 49.54. In the final, Dunne and Van der Zant were replaced with Ashley Callus and Adam Pine who finished in 4th place in 3:11.38. In the 4 × 200 metre freestyle relay, Dunne with Pearson, Ray Hass and Grant Hackett won gold in a new championship record time of 7:00.36 with Dunne swimming the third leg in 1:45.31.

At the 2002 Commonwealth Games in Manchester, Dunne with Hackett, Jason Cram and Ian Thorpe won gold in the 4 × 200 metre freestyle relay in new Games record time of 7:11.69. In the 4 × 100 metre freestyle relay, Dunne with Callus, Pine and Pearson finished first in the heats with a time of 3:20.70. In the final, Dunne and Pine were replaced with Hackett and Thorpe who won gold in a Games record time of 3:16.42.

At the 2002 Pan Pacific Championships in Yokohama, Japan, Dunne finished 15th in the 200 metre freestyle in 1:51.61 and equal 18th in the 100 metre freestyle in 51.12.

== See also ==
- List of Commonwealth Games medallists in swimming (men)
