= Swimming at the 2002 Commonwealth Games =

- Venue: Manchester Aquatics Centre
- Location: Manchester, England
- Dates: 25 July to 4 August 2002

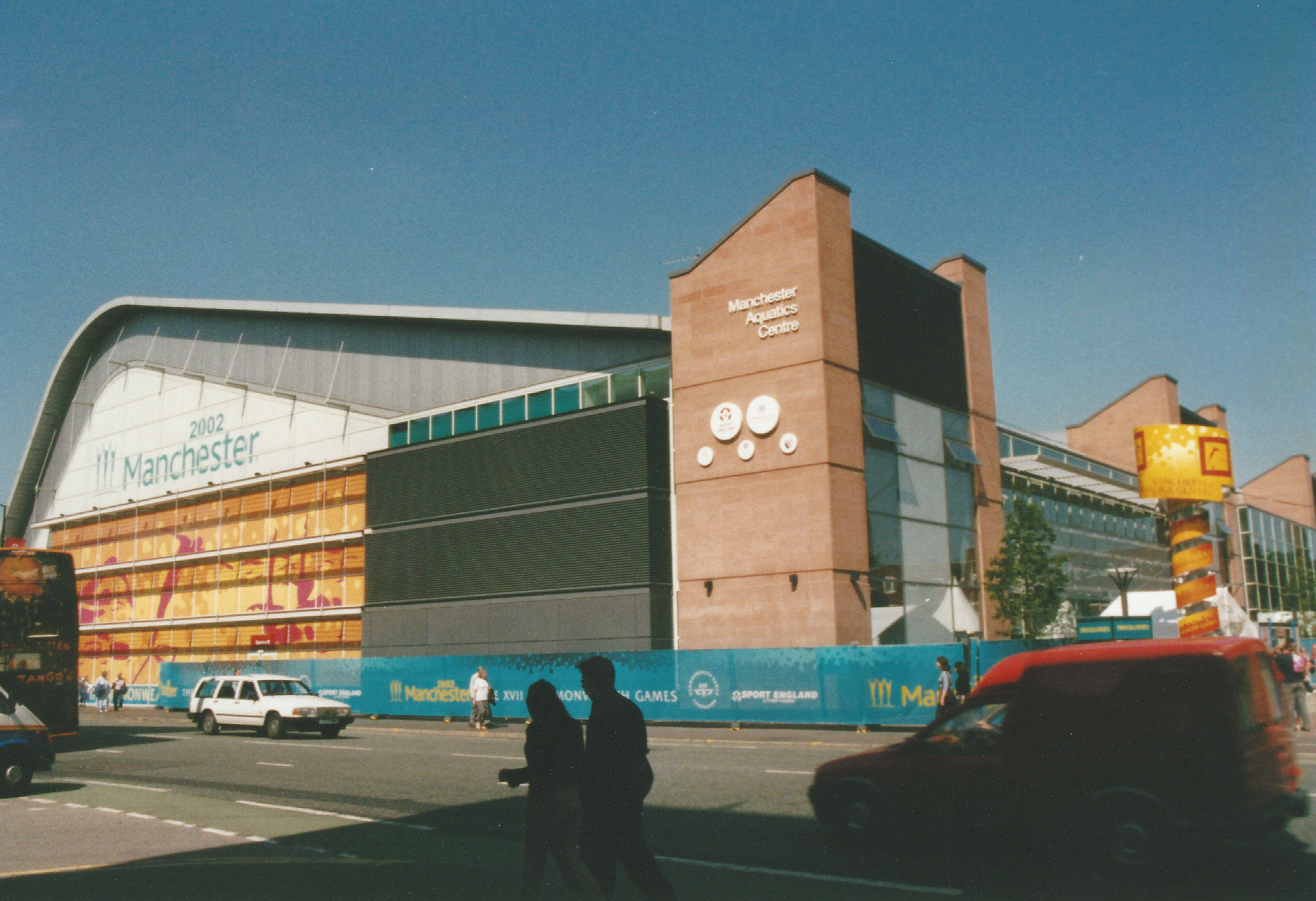
Manchester Aquatics Centre during the Games

Swimming at the 2002 Commonwealth Games was the 17th appearance of Swimming at the Commonwealth Games. Competition was held in Manchester, England, from 25 July to 4 August 2002.

There were 42 medal events: 21 events for both men and women. Australia topped the medal table by virtue of winning 27 gold medals.

== Medal table ==
* Host nation (England)

Rank	Nation	Gold	Silver	Bronze	Total
1	Australia	27	13	8	48
2	England*	10	8	14	32
3	South Africa	3	9	3	15
4	Scotland	1	2	2	5
5	Zimbabwe	1	0	0	1
6	Canada	0	8	10	18
7	Malaysia	0	1	1	2
7	New Zealand	0	1	1	2
9	Jamaica	0	0	2	2
10	Wales	0	0	1	1
Totals (10 entries)		42	42	42	126

== Medallists ==
Event	Gold		Silver		Bronze	
50 m freestyle	Roland Schoeman; South Africa	22.33	Brett Hawke; Australia	22.34	Mark Foster; England	22.47
50 m EAD freestyle	Ben Austin (S8); Australia	27.59 (-0.34)	Philippe Gagnon (S10); Canada	25.04 =WR (0.00)	Benoît Huot (S10); Canada	25.07 (+0.03)
100 m freestyle	Ian Thorpe; Australia	48.73 GR	Ashley Callus; Australia	49.45	Ryk Neethling; South Africa	49.71
100 m EAD freestyle	Ben Austin (S8); Australia	1:00.21 WR (-1.26)	Scott Field (S13); South Africa	55.12 (-0.57)	David Roberts (S7); Wales	1:02.50 WR (-0.12 )
200 m freestyle	Ian Thorpe; Australia	1:44.71 GR	Grant Hackett; Australia	1:46.13	Rick Say; Canada	1:49.40
400 m freestyle	Ian Thorpe; Australia	3:40.08 WR	Grant Hackett; Australia	3:43.48	Graeme Smith; Scotland	3:49.40
1500 m freestyle	Grant Hackett; Australia	14:54.29	Graeme Smith; Scotland	15:07.19	Craig Stevens; Australia	15:09.24
50 m backstroke	Matt Welsh; Australia	25.65 GR	Alex Lim; Malaysia	25.67	Gerhard Zandberg; South Africa	25.89
100 m backstroke	Matt Welsh; Australia	54.72 GR	Ian Thorpe; Australia	55.38	Alex Lim; Malaysia	55.44
200 m backstroke	James Goddard; England	1:59.83	Gregor Tait; Scotland	2:00.55	Simon Militis; England	2:01.04
50 m breaststroke	James Gibson; England	27.72	Adam Whitehead; England	27.79	Darren Mew; England	27.80
100 m breaststroke	Adam Whitehead; England	1:01.13	Morgan Knabe; Canada	1:01.23	James Gibson; England	1:01.64
200 m breaststroke	Jim Piper; Australia	2:13.10	Terence Parkin; South Africa	2:13.34	Mike Brown; Canada	2:13.82
50 m butterfly	Geoff Huegill; Australia	23.57	Roland Schoeman; South Africa	23.66	Mark Foster; England	24.11
100 m butterfly	Geoff Huegill; Australia	52.36 =GR	Mike Mintenko; Canada	52.80	Adam Pine; Australia	53.02
200 m butterfly	Justin Norris; Australia	1:56.95 GR	Stephen Parry; England	1:57.71	James Hickman; England	1:58.55
200 m individual medley	Justin Norris; Australia	2:01.32	Adrian Turner; England	2:02.10	James Goddard; England	2:02.48
400 m individual medley	Justin Norris; Australia	4:16.95 GR	Brian Johns; Canada	4:17.41	Adrian Turner; England	4:18.75
4 × 100 m freestyle relay	Australia; Ashley Callus (49.42); Todd Pearson (49.25); Grant Hackett (49.49); Ian Thorpe (48.26); Leon Dunne^{[a]} Adam Pine^{[a]}	3:16.42 GR	South Africa; Roland Schoeman (); Hendrik Odendaal (); Lyndon Ferns (); Ryk Neethling (); Gerhard Zandberg^{[a]} Nicholas Folker^{[a]}	3:18.86	Canada; Brent Hayden (); Craig Hutchison (); Matthew Rose (); Rick Say (); Brian Johns^{[a]}	3:19.39
4 × 200 m freestyle relay	Australia; Grant Hackett (1:46.61); Leon Dunne (1:50.45); Jason Cram (1:49.81); Ian Thorpe (1:44.82)	7:11.69 GR	Canada; Rick Say (); Brian Johns (); Mark Johnston (); Mike Mintenko ()	7:17.17	England; Adam Faulkner (); James Salter (); Stephen Parry (); Simon Burnett ()	7:22.56
4 × 100 m medley relay	Australia; Matt Welsh (); Jim Piper (); Geoff Huegill (); Ian Thorpe ()	3:36.05 GR	England; Adam Ruckwood (); Adam Whitehead (); James Hickman (); Matthew Kidd ()	3:38.37	Canada; Riley Janes (); Morgan Knabe (); Mike Mintenko (); Brent Hayden ()	3:38.91

^{a} Swimmers who participated in the heats only and received medals.

=== Women ===
Event	Gold		Silver		Bronze	
50 m freestyle	Alison Sheppard; Scotland	24.76	Jodie Henry; Australia	25.37	Toni Jeffs; New Zealand	25.48
50 m EAD freestyle	Natalie du Toit (S9); South Africa	29.68 (-1.06)	Stéphanie Dixon (S9); Canada	30.60 (-0.14)	Danielle Campo (S7); Canada	35.02 GR (+0.04)
100 m freestyle	Jodie Henry; Australia	55.45	Helene Muller; South Africa	55.60	Karen Legg; England	55.86
100 m EAD freestyle	Natalie du Toit (S9); South Africa	1:02.93 (-2.30)	Stéphanie Dixon (S9); Canada	1:05.05 (-0.18)	Kirby Cote (S13); Canada	1:01.76 GR (+1.88)
200 m freestyle	Karen Pickering; England	1:59.69 GR	Karen Legg; England	1:59.86	Elka Graham; Australia; Petria Thomas; Australia	2:00.07
400 m freestyle	Rebecca Cooke; England	4:09.49	Elka Graham; Australia	4:11.47	Janelle Atkinson; Jamaica	4:13.24
800 m freestyle	Rebecca Cooke; England	8:28.54	Amanda Pascoe; Australia	8:34.19	Janelle Atkinson; Jamaica	8:36.23
50 m backstroke	Dyana Calub; Australia	28.98 GR	Jennifer Carroll; Canada	29.05	Sarah Price; England	29.08
100 m backstroke	Sarah Price; England	1:01.06 GR	Dyana Calub; Australia	1:01.86	Giaan Rooney; Australia	1:02.22
200 m backstroke	Sarah Price; England	2:10.58 GR	Joanna Fargus; England	2:11.60	Katy Sexton; England	2:12.01
50 m breaststroke	Zoë Baker; England	30.60	Sarah Poewe; South Africa	31.73	Tarnee White; Australia	31.74
100 m breaststroke	Leisel Jones; Australia	1:08.74	Brooke Hanson; Australia	1:09.10	Sarah Poewe; South Africa	1:09.29
200 m breaststroke	Leisel Jones; Australia	2:25.93	Sarah Poewe; South Africa	2:27.47	Kelli Waite; Australia	2:28.58
50 m butterfly	Petria Thomas; Australia	26.66 GR	Nicole Irving; Australia	27.13	Alison Sheppard; Scotland	27.30
100 m butterfly	Petria Thomas; Australia	58.57	Mandy Loots; South Africa	59.68	Jen Button; Canada	1:00.22
200 m butterfly	Petria Thomas; Australia	2:08.40	Georgina Lee; England	2:10.73	Margaretha Pedder; England	2:11.60
200 m individual medley	Kirsty Coventry; Zimbabwe	2:14.53 GR	Jennifer Reilly; Australia	2:14.99	Marianne Limpert; Canada	2:15.07
400 m individual medley	Jennifer Reilly; Australia	4:43.59	Elizabeth Van Welie; New Zealand	4:44.56	Jessica Abbott; Australia	4:47.11
4 × 100 m freestyle relay	Australia; Alice Mills (); Jodie Henry (); Petria Thomas (); Sarah Ryan ()	3:40.41 GR	England; Melanie Marshall (56.08); Rosalind Brett (55.79); Karen Legg (54.87); Karen Pickering (54.73)	3:41.47	Canada; Laura Nicholls (); Marianne Limpert (); Laura Pomeroy (); Jessica Deglau ()	3:45.33
4 × 200 m freestyle relay	England; Karen Legg (2:00.62); Georgina Lee (2:00.31); Jo Fargus (2:01.05); Karen Pickering (1:59.41)	8:01.39 GR	Australia; Elka Graham (2:00.64); Giaan Rooney (2:00.05); Rebecca Creedy (2:01.43); Petria Thomas (1:59.79)	8:01.91	none awarded as there was only four teams competing.	
4 × 100 m medley relay	Australia; Dyana Calub (1:02.35); Leisel Jones (1:08.67); Petria Thomas (58.53); Jodie Henry (54.15)	4:03.70 GR	South Africa; Charlene Wittstock (1:02.24); Sarah Poewe (1:07.95); Mandy Loots (59.26); Helene Muller (55.51)	4:05.06	England; Sarah Price (1:01.62); Kate Haywood (1:09.53); Georgina Lee (59.67); Karen Legg (54.83)	4:05.65
