= Swimming at the 2002 Commonwealth Games – Men's 200 metre freestyle =

Men's 200 metres freestyle at the 2002 Commonwealth Games
- Venue: Manchester Aquatics Centre
- Dates: 31 July 2002
- Competitors: 21 from 14 nations
- Winning time: 1:44.71 min

Medalists
gold medal	Ian Thorpe	Australia
silver medal	Grant Hackett	Australia
bronze medal	Rick Say	Canada

The Men's 200 metre freestyle event at the 2002 Commonwealth Games was held on 31 July at the Manchester Aquatics Centre.

== Records ==
Prior to this competition, the existing records were as follows;

World record	Ian Thorpe (AUS)	1:44.06	Fukuoka, Japan	25 July 2001
Commonwealth record	Ian Thorpe (AUS)	1:44.06	Fukuoka, Japan	25 July 2001
Games record	Ian Thorpe (AUS)	1:46.70	Kuala Lumpur, Malaysia	12 September 1998

The following records were established during the competition:

Date	Event	Name	Nationality	Time	Record
31 July	Final	Ian Thorpe	Australia	1:44.71	GR

== Results ==
=== Heats ===
The 8 fastest swimmers in the heats qualified for the semifinals.

Rank	Heat	Lane	Name	Nationality	Time	Notes
1	3	4	Ian Thorpe	Australia	1:48.50	Q
2	2	4	Grant Hackett	Australia	1:49.22	Q
3	1	4	Rick Say	Canada	1:49.94	Q
4	3	5	Mark Johnston	Canada	1:50.26	Q
5	3	3	Brian Johns	Canada	1:50.40	Q
6	2	5	Jamie Salter	England	1:50.41	Q
7	1	5	Jason Cram	Australia	1:50.56	Q
8	2	3	David Carry	Scotland	1:51.45	Q
9	2	6	David Davies	Wales	1:51.89	
10	3	6	Damian Alleyne	Barbados	1:53.61	
11	3	2	Alexandros Aresti	Cyprus	1:54.05	
12	1	6	Mark Chay	Singapore	1:55.53	
13	2	2	Ron Cowen	Bermuda	1:55.88	
14	1	7	Jonathon Le Noury	Guernsey	2:01.63	
15	1	2	Ben Lowndes	Guernsey	2:01.94	
16	3	7	Ben Wells	Papua New Guinea	2:03.59	
17	2	7	Barnsley Albert	Seychelles	2:03.71	
18	3	1	Angel Gonzalez	Gibraltar	2:07.35	
19	2	1	Colin Bensadon	Gibraltar	2:08.24	
20	1	1	Lateef Aliasau	Nigeria	2:10.96	
21	3	8	Kpiliboh Otiko	Nigeria	2:12.70	

=== Final ===
The final was held on 31 July at 20:31.

Rank	Lane	Name	Nationality	Time	Notes
1st place, gold medalist(s)	4	Ian Thorpe	Australia	1:44.71	GR
2nd place, silver medalist(s)	5	Grant Hackett	Australia	1:46.13	
3rd place, bronze medalist(s)	3	Rick Say	Canada	1:49.40	
4	7	Jamie Salter	England	1:50.01	
5	2	Brian Johns	Canada	1:50.27	
6	1	Jason Cram	Australia	1:50.30	
7	6	Mark Johnston	Canada	1:51.18	
8	8	David Carry	Scotland	1:51.22	
