= Swimming at the 2002 Commonwealth Games – Men's 1500 metre freestyle =

Men's 1500 metre freestyle at the 2002 Commonwealth Games
- Venue: Manchester Aquatics Centre
- Dates: 3 August 2002 (heats); 4 August 2002 (final)
- Competitors: 9 from 6 nations
- Winning time: 14:54.29

Medalists
gold medal	Grant Hackett	Australia
silver medal	Graeme Smith	Scotland
bronze medal	Craig Stevens	Australia

The men's 1500 metre freestyle event at the 2002 Commonwealth Games as part of the swimming programme took place on 3 and 4 August at the Manchester Aquatics Centre in Manchester, England.

== Records ==
Prior to this competition, the existing world and Commonwealth Games records were as follows.

World record	Grant Hackett (AUS)	14:34.56	Fukuoka, Japan	29 August 2001
Commonwealth record	Grant Hackett (AUS)	14:34.56	Fukuoka, Japan	29 August 2001
Games record	Kieren Perkins (AUS)	14:41.66	Victoria, Canada	18 August 1994

== Results ==
=== Heats ===
Rank	Heat	Lane	Name	Nationality	Time	Notes
1	2	4	Grant Hackett	Australia	15:20.63	Q
2	1	4	Graeme Smith	Scotland	15:21.51	Q
3	1	5	Craig Stevens	Australia	15:26.92	Q
4	1	6	David Davies	Wales	15:33.60	Q
5	2	6	Andrew Hurd	Canada	15:41.73	Q
6	2	3	Andrew Jameson	Scotland	15:42.29	Q
7	2	5	Adam Faulkner	England	15:42.44	Q
8	1	3	Stuart Trees	England	15:52.79	Q
9	2	2	Colin Bensadon	Gibraltar	17:34.69	

=== Final ===
Rank	Lane	Name	Nationality	Time	Notes
1st place, gold medalist(s)	4	Grant Hackett	Australia	14:54.29	
2nd place, silver medalist(s)	5	Graeme Smith	Scotland	15:07.19	
3rd place, bronze medalist(s)	3	Craig Stevens	Australia	15:09.24	
4	1	Adam Faulkner	England	15:13.34	
5	2	Andrew Hurd	Canada	15:14.37	
6	6	David Davies	Wales	15:17.87	
7	7	Andrew Jameson	Scotland	15:31.78	
8	8	Stuart Trees	England	15:34.83	
