= Horth =

Horth is a surname; from Middle High German hort ‘treasure, wealth’.

Notable people with the surname include:

- Fabien Horth (born 1985), French swimmer
- Matt Horth (born 1989), American soccer player
