= Jono van Hazel =

Australian swimmer

Personal information
- Full name: Jonathan van Hazel
- Nickname: "Jono"
- National team: Australia
- Born: 19 September 1978 (age 48) Perth, Western Australia
- Height: 1.88 m (6 ft 2 in)
- Weight: 78 kg (172 lb)

Sport
- Sport: Swimming
- Strokes: Freestyle
- Club: City of Perth Comets

Jonathan "Jono" van Hazel (born 19 September 1978) is an Australian former swimmer who specialized in freestyle events. He is a member of City of Perth Comets Swim Club and is coached and trained by Bernie Mulroy.

Van Hazel qualified for the men's 4 × 100 m freestyle relay, as a member of the Australian team at the 2004 Summer Olympics in Athens, by finishing fifth from the Olympic trials in Sydney in 50.17. In the final, the Australian team finished sixth in 3:15.77. Teaming with Ashley Callus, Eamon Sullivan, and Todd Pearson in the heats, van Hazel swam the third leg, and recorded a split of 49.65 to qualify further for the final in a time of 3:17.64.
