= Riley Janes =

Canadian swimmer (born 1980)

Personal information
- Full name: Riley Janes
- National team: Canada
- Born: June 30, 1980 (age 46) Edmonton, Alberta
- Height: 1.97 m (6 ft 6 in)
- Weight: 95 kg (209 lb)

Sport
- Sport: Swimming
- Strokes: Freestyle, backstroke
- Club: PacificSport National Swim Centre
- College team: Texas A&M University
Medal record
Men's swimming
Representing Canada
Pan Pacific Championships
Bronze medal – third place	2002 Yokohama	4×100 m medley
Commonwealth Games
Bronze medal – third place	2002 Manchester	4×100 m medley

Riley Janes (born June 30, 1980) is a Canadian former competition swimmer who specialized in freestyle and backstroke events. He is a single-time Olympian (2004), and is part of the bronze-medal Canadian medley relay team at the 2002 Commonwealth Games in Manchester, England.

Raised in Saskatoon, Saskatchewan, Janes started swimming at the age of 6, when he competed for the Saskatoon Goldfins under his personal coach. He has held 14 club and 8 age-group state records in the 100-metre backstroke, before joining with the Canadian national team at age 15. He attended the Texas A&M University in College Station, Texas on an athletic scholarship, and swam for the Texas A&M Aggies swimming team, under head coach Mel Nash. While swimming for the Aggies, he received eleven All-American honors, and set a short-course Canadian record of 23.90 at the 2000 NCAA Swimming Championships. In 2002, Janes graduated from the university with a bachelor's degree in marketing.

In 2002, Janes made international headlines at the Pan Pacific Swimming Championships in Yokohama, Japan, and at the Commonwealth Games in Manchester, England, where he earned bronze medals for Canada in the 4×100 m medley relay, along with Mike Brown, Mike Mintenko, and Brent Hayden (3:38.17 in Pan Pacific, and 3:38.91 in Commonwealth).

At the 2004 Summer Olympics in Athens, Janes competed only in two events as a relay swimmer. On the second day of the Games, Janes, along with Mintenko, Hayden, and Yannick Lupien, placed ninth in the 4×100 m freestyle relay with a time of 3:18.35. Six days later, in the 4×100 m medley relay, Janes reunited with Mintenko, Hayden, and Brown after winning their bronze medal for Canada from the Pan Pacific Championships two years earlier. Leading off the backstroke leg in heat one, Janes recorded a split of 56.17, but the Canadians missed the top 8 final by half a second (0.05), finishing in fourth place and tenth overall with a final time of 3:39.36.

== See also ==
- List of Commonwealth Games medallists in swimming (men)
