= Swimming at the 2006 Commonwealth Games – Men's 4 × 100 metre freestyle relay =

The 4 × 100 metres freestyle relay was at Melbourne Sports and Aquatic Centre on 16 March. There was only one heat.

== Final ==
Rank	Lane	Names	Time	Notes	
1st place, gold medalist(s)	4	South Africa	Roland Schoeman (48.65); Lyndon Ferns (48.43); Gerhard Zandberg (49.44); Ryk Neethling (48.45)	3:14.97	GR
2nd place, silver medalist(s)	3	Australia	Michael Klim (49.28); Eamon Sullivan (48.21); Brett Hawke (49.49); Ashley Callus (48.56)	3:15.54	
3rd place, bronze medalist(s)	6	Canada	Yannick Lupien (49.65); Matthew Rose (48.85); Colin Russell (49.11); Brent Hayden (48.13)	3:15.74	
4	5	England	Simon Burnett (48.79); Ross Davenport (48.61); Christopher Cozens (49.89); Anthony Howard (52.27)	3:19.56	
5	2	Scotland	Craig Houston (51.21); Todd Cooper (50.31); Robert Renwick (50.21); David Carry (49.92)	3:21.65	
6	1	Singapore	Zhirong Tay (51.98); Lee Yu Tan (52.33); Shirong Su (52.54); Mingzhe Cheah (54.34)	3:31.19	
7	7	Jersey	Alexis Militis (52.96); Daniel Halksworth (54.75); Liam du Feu (53.39); Simon le Couilliard (53.34)	3:34.44	
8	8	Guernsey	Ben Lowndes (55.11); Jeremy Osborne (swimmer) (53.84); Ian Hubert (54.06); Ian Powell (swimmer) (54.06)	3:37.07	
