= Federico Cappellazzo =

Italian swimmer (born 1980)

Medal record

Men's swimming

Representing Italy

Olympic Games
Bronze medal – third place	2004 Athens	4 x 200 m freestyle relay

European Aquatics Championships (LC)
Gold medal – first place	2002 Berlin	4x200 m freestyle

Summer Universiade
Gold medal – first place	2001 Beijing	4x200 m freestyle
Bronze medal – third place	2003 Daegu	4x200 m freestyle

Federico Cappellazzo (born 16 September 1980 in Turin, Piedmont) is an Italian freestyle swimmer.

Cappellazzo's major achievement is the victory with the Italian relay in Berlin 2002. He participated for Italy in the Summer Olympic of Athens 2004.

== See also ==
- Swimming at the 2004 Summer Olympics – Men's 4 × 200 metre freestyle relay
- (in Italian) Cappellazzo's entry on Italian Wikipedia
