= Graeme Smith (swimmer) =

British swimmer (born 1976)

Personal information
- Nationality: Great Britain; Scotland
- Born: 31 March 1976 (age 50) Falkirk, Scotland

Sport
- Sport: Swimming
- Strokes: Freestyle
Medal record
Men's swimming
Representing Great Britain
Olympic Games
Bronze medal – third place	1996 Atlanta	1500 m freestyle
World Championships (LC)
Silver medal – second place	2001 Fukuoka	1500 m freestyle
Bronze medal – third place	2001 Fukuoka	800 m freestyle
World Championships (SC)
Silver medal – second place	1999 Hong Kong	1500 m freestyle
Bronze medal – third place	1997 Gothenburg	1500 m freestyle
European Championships (LC)
Silver medal – second place	1995 Vienna	1500 m freestyle
European Championships (SC)
Gold medal – first place	1998 Sheffield	1500 m freestyle
Silver medal – second place	2003 Dublin	1500 m freestyle
Representing Scotland
Commonwealth Games
Silver medal – second place	2002 Manchester	1500 m freestyle
Bronze medal – third place	2002 Manchester	400 m freestyle

Graeme Smith (born 31 March 1976) is a former British freestyle swimmer.

== Swimming career ==
He swam for Great Britain at the 1996, 2000 and 2004 Olympics. At the 1996 Olympics, he garnered the bronze medal in the 1500m Freestyle.

He swam for Great Britain (or Scotland as noted) at the:

- Olympics: 1996, 2000, 2004
- World Championships: 1998, 2001, 2003
- Commonwealth Games (Scotland): 1994, 1998, 2002
- European Championships: 1995, 1997
- Short Course Worlds: 1993, 1997, 1999
- Short Course Europeans: 1998, 2003

He won the 1997 ASA British National 400 metres freestyle title and the seven ASA British National 1500 metres freestyle titles.

== See also ==
- List of Commonwealth Games medallists in swimming (men)
- List of Olympic medalists in swimming (men)
