= Guilherme Roth =

Brazilian swimmer (born 1982)

Personal information
- Full name: Guilherme Roth dos Santos
- Nationality: Brazil
- Born: 11 October 1982 (age 43) Caxias do Sul, Rio Grande do Sul, Brazil
- Height: 1.86 m (6 ft 1 in)
- Weight: 86 kg (190 lb)

Sport
- Sport: Swimming
- Strokes: Freestyle
Medal record
Men's swimming
Representing Brazil
South American Games
Silver medal – second place	2010 Medellín	4x100 m freestyle

Guilherme Roth dos Santos (born 11 October 1982 in Caxias do Sul) is a Brazilian competitive swimmer.

He swam at the 2002 Pan Pacific Swimming Championships, where he finished 4th in the 4×100-metre freestyle, and 14th in the 50-metre freestyle.

At the 2006 FINA World Swimming Championships (25 m), in Shanghai, he was a finalist in the 4×100-metre freestyle, finishing 5th, and in the 50-metre freestyle, finishing 8th. He also ranked 19th in the 100-metre freestyle, and 9th in the 4×100-metre medley.

He joined the Brazilian national delegation who attended the 2009 World Aquatics Championships in Rome, where he competed in the 4×100-metre freestyle, along with César Cielo, Fernando Silva and Nicolas Oliveira. The team finished the final in fourth place, with a time of 3:10.80, South American record.

At the 2010 South American Games, Roth won the silver medal in the 4×100-metre freestyle.

Participating in the 2012 FINA World Swimming Championships (25 m) in Istanbul, he went to the 4×100-metre medley final, finishing 4th, and the 4×100-metre freestyle final, finishing 6th. He was also 15th in the 100-metre freestyle.
