= Nate Dusing =

American swimmer (born 1978)

Personal information
- Full name: Nathaniel James Dusing
- Nickname: "Nate"
- National team: United States
- Born: November 25, 1978 (age 47) Villa Hills, Kentucky, U.S.
- Height: 6 ft 1 in (1.85 m)
- Weight: 183 lb (83 kg)
- Spouse: Michelle Wickwire

Sport
- Sport: Swimming
- Strokes: Freestyle, individual medley, butterfly
- Club: Cincinnati Marlins
- College team: University of Texas
- Coach: Ken Stopkotte (Marlins); Eddie Reese (U. Texas)
Medal record
Men's swimming
Representing the United States
Olympic Games
Silver medal – second place	2000 Sydney	4×200 m freestyle
Bronze medal – third place	2004 Athens	4×100 m freestyle
World Championships (LC)
Gold medal – first place	2005 Montreal	4×100 m freestyle
Silver medal – second place	2003 Barcelona	4×200 m freestyle
Bronze medal – third place	2001 Fukuoka	4×200 m freestyle
World Championships (SC)
Gold medal – first place	2004 Indianapolis	4×100 m freestyle
Pan Pacific Championships
Gold medal – first place	1997 Fukuoka	4×100 m medley
Silver medal – second place	2002 Yokohama	4×100 m freestyle
Silver medal – second place	2002 Yokohama	4×200 m freestyle
Bronze medal – third place	1997 Fukuoka	100 m butterfly
Bronze medal – third place	2002 Yokohama	100 m freestyle
Bronze medal – third place	2002 Yokohama	200 m freestyle

Nathaniel James Dusing (born November 25, 1978) is an American former competition swimmer for the University of Texas, a 2000 and 2004 Olympic medalist, and a world champion.

== Early swimming ==
Nate Dusing was born one of four children to Jim and Judy Dusing in Villa Hills, Kentucky, on November 25, 1978. While living in Villa Hills, Dusing began swimming for the nearby Cincinnati Marlins around the age of eight and continued with the team through High School when he was coached by Ken Stopkotte. At 12, he won the American Swimming Coaches Association Achievement Award for the fastest mile recorded for a 12-year old. The award recognized Dusing as a potential future Olympian, and he was invited to swim for a week in August, 1992, at the Olympic Training Center in Colorado Springs. Dusing won six swimming state championships for Covington Catholic High School competing for Coach Steve Durkee, before graduating in 1997. A talented and focused student, Dusing graduated Covington Catholic with a 3.5 grade point average. As a high school Junior, Dusing held the regional records of 1:41.89 in the 200 freestyle and of 4:36.37 in the 500 freestyle. Dusing also swam for the

=== National high school record ===
On February 21, 1997, in a preliminary round, Dusing set a national high school record at the Kentucky High School Swimming State Championships in the 100-yard butterfly of 47.10 breaking the previous high school national mark of 47.6 by .5 seconds. Dusing earned All America status for his achievement and became the first swimmer from Kentucky to set a National High School record of this type. His 100-yard Butterfly time would stand as the national high school record until 2009. The overall American record in the 100-yard butterfly was 46.26 at the time. Dusing also finished as the top national prep swimmer in the 100-yard backstroke, making him a top-rated national recruit for university swim teams. In the February, 1997 Kentucky High School State meet in Lexington, Kentucky, he swam a 48.07 for the 100-yard backstroke representing Covington Catholic winning the state title, but not setting a national record. He was voted Male Outstanding competitor, and helped lead Covington Catholic to second place in the team standings for the meet. In High School, Dusing was a member of the Junior National Team.

== University of Texas ==
After High School, Dusing attended and swim for the University of Texas graduating around 2001, where he was managed and trained by Hall of Fame Coach Eddie Reese, and was team Co-Captain in his Senior year. Reese led the Texas Longhorns swim team to the NCAA team national championships in 2000, and 2001, with the help of swimmers of Dusing's caliber. As a University of Texas competitor, Dusing would excel all 4 years, winning 11 NCAA titles in both relays and individual events, and was a member of NCAA championship teams in both 2000 and 2001. He was an individual NCAA champion in the 200 IM where he set an NCAA record. He was also an NCAA champion in the 200 back, and a member of nine NCAA championship relay teams while at Texas. Dusing was also a Big 12 champion in the 200-meter butterfly all four years he attended University of Texas.

== 2000, 2004 Olympics ==
Dusing represented the United States at two consecutive Summer Olympics. At the 2000 Summer Olympics in Sydney, Australia, he earned a silver medal by swimming for the second-place U.S. team in the preliminary heats of the men's 4×200-meter freestyle relay. The American team that swam in the finals and won the Silver had a combined time of 7:12.64 with Australia taking the gold.

Four years later, at the 2004 Summer Olympics in Athens, Greece, he received a bronze medal by swimming for the third-place U.S. team in the preliminary heats of the men's 4×100-meter freestyle relay. The American team that swam in the finals had a combined time of 3:14.62, with South Africa and the Netherlands taking first and second place respectively.

The Men's Olympic coach for the 2000 Olympics was Mark Schubert with Dusing's UT Coach Eddie Reese as an Assistant Coach and the 2004 Olympic Head Coach was again Dusing's Coach at UT, Eddie Reese.

== International competition ==
Dusing captured six medals at the Pan Pacifics, taking a gold in the 1997 4x100 medley relay. He won three individual bronze medals at Pan Pacs, in the 100 butterfly in 1997, and in the 100 and 200-meter freestyles in 2002.

=== World aquatic championships ===
Dusing swam at the 2001, and 2003 World Championships, winning a full set of medals in freestyle relays. He won a gold in the 4x100 free relay at the 2004 World Short-Course Championships. He was a member of gold medal-winning U.S. relay teams in the 4×100-meter freestyle at the 2005 World Aquatics Championships, and the 2004 World Short Course Championships.

Nearing the end of his swimming career, Dusing swam a 50.18.8 for the 100-meter freestyle at the U.S. National Championships in August 2005 in Irvine, California in August, 2005

=== Honors ===
Dusing was named the 1997 USA High School Swimmer of the Year by Swimming World Magazine in August, 1997. His High School, Covington Catholic, was ranked eighth in the nation that year.

In March 1997, as a UT Sophomore, he was named the "Big 12 Swimmer of the Year" when he swam a 1:44.13 for the 200-yard butterfly, winning his second Big 12 individual championship, and qualifying for the NCAAs in three individual events and three relays. He was inducted into the Texas Swimming and Diving Hall of Fame in 2024.

Dusing has worked in the medical device industry and resided in Dripping Springs, Texas, with his wife, Michelle Wickwire Dusing, a winner of a Soccer letter at the University of Texas. Dusing married Michelle around 2006, and the couple have two daughters.

== See also ==
- List of Olympic medalists in swimming (men)
- List of University of Texas at Austin alumni
- List of World Aquatics Championships medalists in swimming (men)
