= Klete Keller =

American swimmer (born 1982)

Personal information
- Full name: Klete Derik Keller
- National team: United States
- Born: March 21, 1982 (age 44) Las Vegas, Nevada, U.S.
- Height: 6 ft 6 in (1.98 m)
- Weight: 197 lb (89 kg)

Sport
- Sport: Swimming
- Strokes: Freestyle
- Club: Club Wolverine; Trojan Swim Club
- College team: University of Southern California
- Coach: Jon Urbanchek; Bob Bowman; Dave Salo
Medal record
Men's swimming
Representing the United States
Olympic Games
Gold medal – first place	2004 Athens	4×200 m freestyle
Gold medal – first place	2008 Beijing	4×200 m freestyle
Silver medal – second place	2000 Sydney	4×200 m freestyle
Bronze medal – third place	2000 Sydney	400 m freestyle
Bronze medal – third place	2004 Athens	400 m freestyle
World Championships (LC)
Gold medal – first place	2005 Montreal	4×200 m freestyle
Gold medal – first place	2007 Melbourne	4×200 m freestyle
Silver medal – second place	2003 Barcelona	4×200 m freestyle
Bronze medal – third place	2001 Fukuoka	200 m freestyle
Bronze medal – third place	2001 Fukuoka	4×200 m freestyle
World Championships (SC)
Gold medal – first place	2002 Moscow	200 m freestyle
Gold medal – first place	2002 Moscow	4×100 m freestyle
Bronze medal – third place	2002 Moscow	4×200 m freestyle
Pan Pacific Championships
Gold medal – first place	1999 Sydney	5 km open water
Gold medal – first place	2006 Victoria	200 m freestyle
Gold medal – first place	2006 Victoria	4×200 m freestyle
Silver medal – second place	2002 Yokohama	4×200 m freestyle
Bronze medal – third place	2002 Yokohama	400 m freestyle
Bronze medal – third place	2006 Victoria	400 m freestyle

Klete Derik Keller (born March 21, 1982) is an American former competitive swimmer. Before retiring from swimming in 2008, he won five Olympic medals including two golds, at the 2000, 2004, and 2008 Summer Olympics in the 400-meter freestyle and the 4×200-meter freestyle relay.

In January 2021, Keller took part in the January 6 United States Capitol attack. Later he was arrested and charged with three offenses stemming from his participation. He was indicted on seven charges by a grand jury the next month, and later pleaded guilty to a single felony charge as part of a plea bargain. In December 2023, he was sentenced to three years of probation and six months of home detention. On January 20, 2025, the first day of the second presidency of Donald Trump, he was granted a full and unconditional federal pardon as part of Trump's pardon of January 6 United States Capitol attack defendants.

== Early life ==
Keller was born March 21, 1982, in Las Vegas to mother Karen and father Kelly. Both parents were intercollegiate athletes at Arizona State University in Tempe; his father played basketball and his mother swam. Klete's older sister, Kelsey, swam for University of Washington, and his younger sister, Kalyn, was on the swim team for the University of Southern California (USC) and competed at the 2004 Summer Olympics.

Klete Keller grew up in Phoenix and graduated from Arcadia High School in Phoenix in 2000.

Per Jon Urbanchek, who coached Keller in his later swimming career, "he had a rough time at home". Others have corroborated that Keller had a dysfunctional home life.

=== Early swimming career ===
At the 1998 Summer Nationals, Keller was named "Rookie of the Meet". At the 1999 U.S. National Swimming Championships, he won bronze in the 1500m freestyle, behind Chris Thompson and Erik Vendt. Keller also competed in the 400-meter freestyle, placing fifth behind Chad Carvin, Erik Vendt, Uğur Taner, and Mark Warkentin.

Keller won gold in the 5k open water race at the 1999 Phillips 66 National Championships with a time of 46:51, earning him a spot in the same event the 1999 Pan Pacific Swimming Championships in Sydney. In the 5k open water race at the 1999 Pan Pacific Swimming Championships, Keller won gold with a time of 55:42. Keller was also a member of the 1999 United States National Junior Team.

== Collegiate swimming career ==
Keller attended the University of Southern California for two years from 2000 to 2001, but left school to focus on swimming. While at USC, he won multiple individual and relay Pac-10 and NCAA Championships in the 200, 500 and 1,650-yard freestyle, as well as freestyle relays. He was a four-time NCAA champion. In both 2000 and 2001, Keller was named to the United States swimming "All-Star Team".

Keller won a bronze medal in the 400 meter freestyle at the 2000 Summer Olympics. He was one of many 2000 Olympic swimming medalists from The Race Club World Team, a summer swimming camp in Florida. Also in 2000, he won the summer national title in the 400 meter freestyle. In 2001, Keller won the spring national title in the 200 meter freestyle. Later that year at the World Aquatics Championships, Keller won an individual bronze medal in the 200 meter freestyle and a team bronze medal in the 4 x 200 meter freestyle relay.

== Professional swimming career ==
Keller left USC after his sophomore season, when he went professional, forfeiting his final two years of collegiate sports eligibility. Afterward, he trained until 2007 at Club Wolverine, run at the University of Michigan in Ann Arbor, under Jon Urbanchek and later Bob Bowman. Urbanchek was the coach of the three Olympic swimming teams on which Keller competed. Late into his swimming career, Keller cited Urbanchek as his greatest influence, remarking, "He's the type of man I want to be like when I'm older." After going professional, Keller competed in two more Summer Olympics, in 2004 and 2008. Twice during his career, he was the cover athlete of Swimming World. In 2015, the Reno Gazette-Journal named Keller as the most decorated Olympian ever born in Nevada. In addition to the two times he made the team during his collegiate career, Keller, Keller was named to the United States Swimming "All-Star Team" four more times after going professional (in 2002, 2004, 2005, and 2006). Towards the end of his swimming career, Keller was reported to train for five hours every day, six days per week.

At the 2002 Pan Pacific Swimming Championships, Keller won an individual bronze medal in the 400 meter freestyle race and a team silver medal in the 4 x 200 meter freestyle relay. At the 2002 FINA Short Course World Championships, he won gold in the 200 meter freestyle and the 200 400 meter freestyle, as well as bronze in the 800 meter freestyle. He also won the summer 2002 national title in the 400 meter freestyle and was named to the United States Swimming "All-Star Team". At the 2003 World Aquatics championships, Keller was on the gold-winning American team in the 800 m freestyle. He placed fifth in the 400 meter freestyle. He competed in the 200 meter freestyle, being eliminated after placing last in the semifinals. Also in 2003, Keller won the spring national title in the 400 meter freestyle.

During the 4×200-meter freestyle relay at the Athens Summer Olympics in 2004, Keller held off a charging Ian Thorpe in the anchor leg to win the race by 0.13 seconds. It was the first time Australia had been beaten in the event in over seven years. In January 2016, Andy Ross of the magazine Swimming World named it as one of the greatest Olympic relays of all-time. The American relay of Michael Phelps, Ryan Lochte, Peter Vanderkaay, and Keller were undefeated in competition from those Olympics onward. Vanderkaay, Larsen Jensen, Erik Vendt, and Keller made up the core of the premier American mid-distance/distance freestyle swimmers. Keller also won bronze in 400 meter freestyle. At the Olympics, Keller placed fourth in the 200 meter freestyle. Also in 2004, Keller was named to the United States swimming "All-Star Team".

In 2005, Keller was ranked 7th in the world in the 200m freestyle, 4th in the 400 meter freestyle, and 78th in the 100 meter freestyle. At the 2005 World Aquatics championships, he won a gold in the 4×200 m freestyle. Also in 2005, he won the United States summer national title in the 800 meter freestyle. In 2005, he won the summer national title in the 400 meter freestyle and was on the United States swimming "All-Star" team. In his 2006 season, at the U.S. championships he achieved the top time in the world in the 400 freestyle (3:44.27). For the season, he was ranked 1st in the world in the 400 meter freestyle, 3rd for the 200 meter freestyle, and 52nd for the 100 meter freestyle. At the 2006 Pan Pacific Swimming Championships, Keller won three medals. He won gold in the 200 meter freestyle, was a member of the gold-winning United States team in the 4 x 200 meter freestyle relay, and won bronze in the 400 meter freestyle. Keller also competed in the 100 meter freestyle (coming eleventh in the heats), and the 50 meter freestyle (coming 32nd in the heats). In the same year, he won the 2006 summer national title in the 400 meter freestyle, won bronze at the United States National Championships in the 200 meter freestyle, and was named to the United States swimming "All-Star Team".

In 2007, Keller left Ann Arbor and returned to USC to finish school and train with the Trojan Swim Club under coach Dave Salo. After returning to USC, Keller completed his bachelor degree. Originally he studied science and public policy in college, and at one point in college he was studying construction management. He finally received a degree in public policy and real estate development, having attended both USC and Eastern Michigan University in Ypsilanti (a short distance east of Ann Arbor). He later said that ahead of the 2008 Summer Olympics, he had considered going to Arizona State University to study criminology. In the 2007 World Rankings, Keller was ranked 18th in the 400 meter freestyle, 49th in the 200 meter freestyle, and 78th in the 100 meter freestyle. At the 2007 World Aquatics Championships in Melbourne, Australia he was on the gold-winning team in the 4 x 200 meter freestyle relay. He individually placed tenth in the 400 meter freestyle and 18th in the 200 meter freestyle. At the 2008 Summer Olympics, Keller won gold in the 4 x 200 meter freestyle relay.

== Post-swimming career ==
Keller retired from swimming after the 2008 Summer Olympics. He initially held a series of jobs in sales and finance. From October 2009 through November 2010, Keller worked at the Ann Arbor, Michigan office of Northwestern Mutual Investment Services. From June 2011 through November 2012, he worked for Multi-Bank Securities in Southfield, Michigan west of Warren. In February 2013, he began working at the Memphis, Tennessee, office of Cantor Fitzgerald as a debt trader. He left the firm in February 2014. Commenting on that time in 2018, Keller said, "Swimmer had been my identity for most of my life, and then I quickly transitioned to other roles and never gave myself time to get comfortable with them. I really struggled with things. I didn't enjoy my work, and that unhappiness and lack of identity started creeping into my marriage." In an interview years later for a podcast for the Olympic Channel, Keller commented on his performance as an employee at this time, saying that he had set high expectations for himself, but had been "entitled" in the workplace, as well as a bad employee.

In 2018, Keller moved to Colorado Springs, Colorado south of Denver where he began a career as a real estate broker, being employed as an independent contractor with the real estate firm Hoff & Leigh. In 2021, when SwimSwam contacted them for their January 11 story reporting Keller's involvement in the storming of the Capitol, Hoff & Leigh confirmed that Keller was still an employee of the firm. The SwimSwam reporter who broke the story commented in the article that the firm "seemed unaware of the Capitol video or Keller's possible involvement" in the attack. Later that day, the firm erased all mentions of Keller from its website. On January 12, 2021, Hoff & Leigh released a statement saying that Keller no longer worked for the company, having resigned, and that they did not condone his actions. According to a January 2022 SwimSwam report, Keller returned to work with Hoff & Leigh in May 2021.

== Participation in the 2021 United States Capitol attack ==
Keller was identified as a participant in the 2021 United States Capitol attack, where he was seen inside the Capitol rotunda in a crowd of people clashing with police officers. Keller's presence was reported by several people who saw a video posted by conservative outlet Townhall. Some of the people who recognized Keller in the video said that he had frequently posted pro-Donald Trump content on his social-media accounts. Keller deleted his social-media accounts after being identified. He was recognized, in part, because of his height, the fact that he was wearing a U.S. Olympic team jacket, and that his face was unobstructed in the video.

On January 13, 2021, for his involvement in the storming of the Capitol, the Federal Bureau of Investigation charged Keller with obstructing law enforcement engaged in official duties, unlawfully entering Capitol grounds, and disorderly conduct on Capitol grounds. For those charges, he originally faced up to 15.5 years in prison. He surrendered himself the next day and federal agents executed a search and seizure warrant on his home. Keller was released from custody the same day on a personal recognizance bond. A judge ordered him not to travel to Washington D.C. anytime before January 21, the day after the inauguration of Joe Biden. After that date, the judge's orders allowed him to travel to Washington, D.C., for court appearances and to meet with lawyers, but required him to ask permission before making any trips to North Carolina, where his children live. A grand jury would decide whether more serious charges were warranted. On February 10, the grand jury indicted Keller on seven charges, including civil disorder, obstructing an official proceeding, entering a restricted building, disorderly conduct in a restricted building, and disorderly conduct in a Capitol building. The charges had a maximum sentence of nearly 30 years. On March 9, 2021, Keller pleaded not guilty to seven charges, including civil disorder and witness tampering.

On September 29, 2021, as part of a plea bargain, Keller pleaded guilty to a felony count of obstructing an official proceeding before Congress. He also pledged to cooperate with any continuing investigation into the attack. The felony carried a maximum potential sentence of 20 years. In his guilty plea, he admitted to spending roughly an hour in the United States Capitol building. He admitted that, in the Capitol Rotunda, he shouted "Fuck Nancy Pelosi!" and "Fuck Chuck Schumer!", captured video and photographs, and "jerked his elbow" to avoid law enforcement officers that were trying to eject him from the building. He admitted that he later destroyed a phone and a memory card which he had brought with him to the Capitol, and threw away the jacket he wore at the time.

In December 2022, Keller was free on bond pending his sentencing. He faced 21 to 27 months in prison and sentencing was set for July 7, 2023. On June 15, 2023, Keller requested a postponement of his sentencing hearing so he could "further facilitate" his cooperation with the ongoing investigation into the Capitol attack. Sentencing was postponed until December 1, 2023. On November 17, the U.S. government requested a 10-month sentence for Keller, shorter than the guideline of 21–27 months in similar cases. On December 4, 2023, Keller received a sentence of six months home detention and three years probation.

On January 20, 2025, the first day of the second presidency of Donald Trump, Keller received a federal pardon as part of Trump's pardon of January 6 United States Capitol attack defendants.

== Personal life ==
Ahead of the 2004 Summer Olympics, Keller reportedly suffered a period of insomnia and malaise, which resulted in an "emotional breakdown".

In 2008, ahead of the Olympics, Keller and Cari Carr got engaged. They married and had three children. Keller and Carr divorced. The two went through a custody dispute during the divorce.

In 2018, Keller revealed that in January 2014, after going through both his divorce and becoming unemployed, he had become homeless and lived out of his car for about ten months. He also said that, for four years, he lacked visitation rights with his children, making it unable to see them, despite living only minutes away from them. In an interview he conducted in the spring of 2014, he said that he was no longer certain of the whereabouts of three of his Olympic medals. In the same interview, Keller said that he had failed to find similar successes in his endeavors after retiring from swimming. He said that he made the mistake of not having the foresight to plan for his post-swimming career, and felt somewhat "bitter" both towards himself and his sport. He expressed regret for having continued swimming for another four years after the 2004 Olympics, saying that he believed, in retrospect, that he should have retired after the 2004 Summer Olympics and gone back to school.

In 2018, Keller credited his sister Kalyn with having assisted him with what he saw as a personal comeback from his low-point of homelessness, saying that she had taken him in. During that time he taught swimming lessons and operated swim clinics. He also lived with his grandmother at one point. About the time he moved to Colorado Springs, Keller regained visitation with his children. As of 2021, his children lived in North Carolina and he visits with them. In August 2018, Keller was in the news for an incident in which a dog sitter he had hired hosted a threesome in his house without permission from Keller. Keller walked into his house finding strangers in a state of undress.

After his participation in the storming of the United States Capitol, friends of Keller's described him as a strong political conservative and a gun enthusiast, who had expressed increasingly strong support for Donald Trump on his social media in the previous years, particularly in the year immediately prior. Keller had previously attended the "Million MAGA March", a pro-Trump 2020–21 United States election protest held in Washington D.C., in late November 2020. After Keller's participation in the storming of the capitol, his ex-wife, then known as Cari Carr Sherrill, said that she no longer had a personal relationship with Keller, and remarked that she believed that "during and since his swimming career, he's had many personal issues he's chosen not to address."

In 2024, Keller married his second wife, Lindsey. During their honeymoon, while on a pontoon boat off the coast of Florida in Choctawhatchee Bay, Keller rescued an 18-year old high school student from drowning after a severe jet ski crash. Keller, who witnessed the accident from the boat, swam to the unconscious teenager and performed lifesaving measures while keeping him above water.

== See also ==
- Criminal proceedings in the January 6 United States Capitol attack
- List of cases of the January 6 United States Capitol attack (G-L)
- List of people granted executive clemency in the second Trump presidency
- List of Olympic medalists in swimming (men)
- List of University of Southern California people
- List of World Aquatics Championships medalists in swimming (men)
- World record progression 4 × 200 metres freestyle relay
