= Fabien Horth =

French swimmer (born 1985)

Personal information
- Born: 20 July 1985 (age 41) Saint-Mandé, France
- Height: 1.85 m (6 ft 1 in)
- Weight: 80 kg (180 lb)

Sport
- Sport: Swimming
- Club: AC Pontault-Roissy
Medal record
Representing France
European Championships
Bronze medal – third place	2004 Madrid	4×200 m freestyle

Fabien Horth (born 20 July 1985) is a retired French swimmer who won a bronze medal in the 4×200 m freestyle relay at the 2004 European Aquatics Championships. He finished seventh in the same event at the 2004 Summer Olympics.

He retired in 2011 to focus on his physiotherapy education at the Hôpital l'Archet in Nice.
