= Zheng Kunliang =

Chinese swimmer

Personal information
- Born: January 14, 1981 (age 45) Ningbo, China

Sport
- Sport: Swimming

Zheng Kunliang (born 4 January 1981) is a Chinese former swimmer who competed in the 2004 Summer Olympics.
