= Johannes Oesterling =

German swimmer

Personal information
- Born: 3 February 1983 (age 43) Hanau, Germany
- Height: 1.91 m (6 ft 3 in)
- Weight: 74 kg (163 lb)

Sport
- Sport: Swimming
- Club: TSV Eintracht Stadtallendorf
Medal record
Representing Germany
World Championships
Bronze medal – third place	2003 Barcelona	4×200 m freestyle

Johannes Oesterling (also Österling; born 3 February 1983) is a German swimmer who won a bronze medal in the 4×200 m freestyle relay at the 2003 World Aquatics Championships. He finished sixth in the same event at the 2004 Summer Olympics.
