= Yannick Lupien =

Canadian swimmer

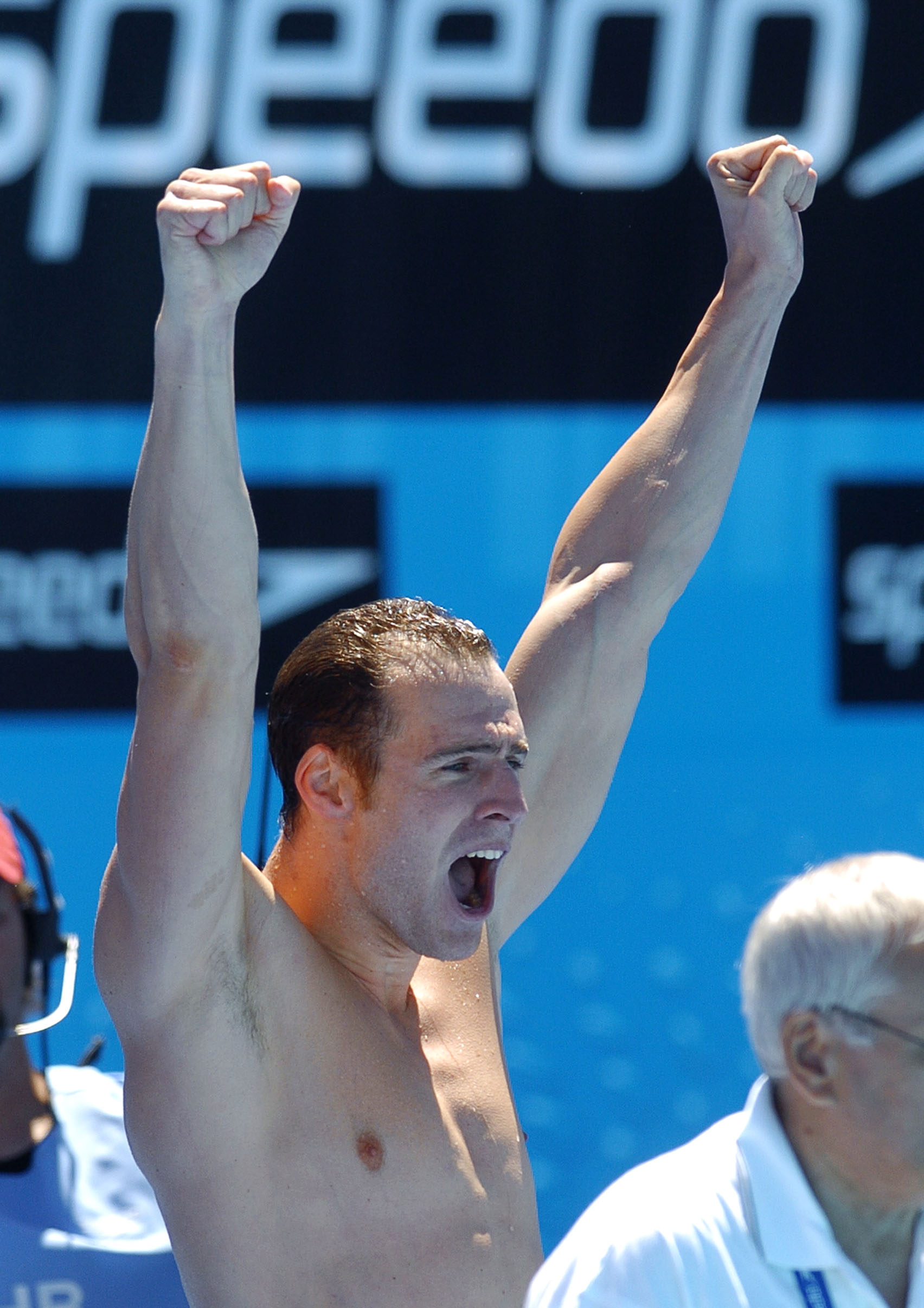
- Lupien at 2005 World Championships

Personal information
- Full name: Yannick Lupien
- National team: Canada
- Born: February 21, 1980 (age 46) Laval, Quebec
- Height: 1.98 m (6 ft 6 in)
- Weight: 90 kg (198 lb)

Sport
- Sport: Swimming
- Strokes: Freestyle
Medal record
Men's swimming
Representing Canada
World Championships (LC)
Silver medal – second place	2005 Montreal	4×100 m freestyle
World Championships (SC)
Bronze medal – third place	1999 Hong Kong	4×200 m freestyle
Pan Pacific Championships
Silver medal – second place	1999 Sydney	4×100 m medley
Bronze medal – third place	1999 Sydney	4×100 m freestyle
Bronze medal – third place	1999 Sydney	4×200 m freestyle
Bronze medal – third place	2002 Hokohama	4×100 m freestyle
Commonwealth Games
Bronze medal – third place	2006 Melbourne	4×100 m freestyle
Pan American Games
Bronze medal – third place	1999 Winnipeg	4×200 m freestyle
Bronze medal – third place	1999 Winnipeg	4×100 m medley

Yannick Lupien (born February 21, 1980 in Laval, Quebec, Canada) is a former freestyle swimmer who represented Canada at the 2000 and 2004 Summer Olympics. His best Olympic result was sixth place as a member of the Canadian team in the 4x100-metre medley relay in Sydney in 2000. Originally from Aylmer, Quebec, in 2012 Lupien began a career as a professional firefighter in Trois-Rivières, Quebec, Canada.
