= Bruno Bonfim =

Brazilian swimmer (born 1979)

Personal information
- Nationality: Brazil
- Born: 18 May 1979 (age 47) Anápolis, Goiás, Brazil
- Height: 1.77 m (5 ft 10 in)
- Weight: 73 kg (161 lb)

Sport
- Sport: Swimming
- Strokes: Freestyle
Medal record
Men's swimming
Representing Brazil
Pan American Games
Bronze medal – third place	2003 Santo Domingo	400 m freestyle

Bruno Bonfim (born 18 May 1979 in Anápolis) is a middle-distance freestyle swimmer from Brazil, who competed for his native country at the 2004 Summer Olympics in Athens, Greece. A year earlier, he won the bronze medal at the Pan American Games in Santo Domingo, Dominican Republic.

At the 2000 FINA World Swimming Championships (25 m) in Athens, Bonfim went to the 4×200-metre freestyle final, finishing in 8th place. He also finished 22nd in the 400-metre freestyle.

In the 2002 FINA World Swimming Championships (25 m) in Moscow, Bonfim was close to winning a medal, finishing in 4th place in the 4×200-metre freestyle also got the 20th place in the 400-metre freestyle and the 13th in the 1500-metre freestyle.

He swam at the 2002 Pan Pacific Swimming Championships, where he finished 5th in the 4×200-metre freestyle, 7th in the 1500-metre freestyle, 8th in the 400-metre freestyle, 8th in the 800-metre freestyle, and 16th in the 200-metre freestyle.

Participating in the 2003 World Aquatics Championships in Barcelona, Bonfim finished 30th in the 400-metre freestyle and 24th in the 1500-metre freestyle.

In 2003, he won the bronze medal at the 2003 Pan American Games in 400-metre freestyle. He also finished 6th place in the 1500-metre freestyle.

He represented Brazil in Athens Olympics in 2004, swimming 4×200-metre freestyle, where he finished in 9th place, and 400-metre freestyle, where he arrived in 34th place.
