= Mike Mintenko =

Canadian swimmer (born 1975)

Personal information
- Full name: Michael Mintenko
- Nickname: "Mike"
- National team: Canada
- Born: November 7, 1975 (age 50) Moose Jaw, Saskatchewan
- Height: 1.91 m (6 ft 3 in)
- Weight: 93 kg (205 lb)
- Spouse: Lindsay Benko

Sport
- Sport: Swimming
- Strokes: Butterfly, freestyle
- College team: University of Nevada, Las Vegas
Medal record
Men's swimming
Representing Canada
World Championships (LC)
Silver medal – second place	2005 Montreal	4×100 m freestyle
World Championships (SC)
Bronze medal – third place	2004 Indianapolis	4×100 m freestyle
Pan Pacific Championships
Silver medal – second place	1999 Sydney	4×100 m medley
Bronze medal – third place	2002 Yokohama	100 m butterfly
Bronze medal – third place	2002 Yokohama	4×100 m freestyle
Bronze medal – third place	2002 Yokohama	4×200 m freestyle
Bronze medal – third place	2002 Yokohama	4×100 m medley
Commonwealth Games
Silver medal – second place	2002 Manchester	100 m butterfly
Silver medal – second place	2002 Manchester	4×200 m freestyle
Bronze medal – third place	2002 Manchester	4×100 m medley

Michael Mintenko (born November 7, 1975) is a former competition swimmer who represented Canada in butterfly and freestyle events in various international championships, including the 2000 and 2004 Summer Olympics. He is a ten-time medallist, spanning the FINA world championships, Pan Pacific Championships, and Commonwealth Games.

Mintenko is married to Olympic gold medallist Lindsay Benko.

== See also ==
- List of Commonwealth Games medallists in swimming (men)
