= Antony Matkovich =

Australian swimmer

Personal information
- Full name: Antony Matkovich
- National team: Australia
- Born: 12 June 1977 (age 49) Perth, Western Australia
- Height: 1.96 m (6 ft 5 in)
- Weight: 92 kg (203 lb)

Sport
- Sport: Swimming
- Strokes: Freestyle
- Club: Campbelltown Swim Club
Medal record
Men's swimming
Representing Australia
Olympic Games
Silver medal – second place	2004 Athens	4×200 m freestyle relay

Antony Matkovich (born 12 June 1977) is an Australian swimmer who won a silver medal in the 4x200-metre freestyle relay at the 2004 Summer Olympics.

Coming from Perth, Western Australia, Matkovich became a scholarship holder at the Australian Institute of Sport in 2000. He had previously been a member of Australia's water polo team. He made his international debut in 2001 at the 2001 World Championships in Fukuoka, Japan where he collected a gold medal by swimming in the heats of the 4×200-metre freestyle relay. Australia proceeded to break its own world record in the final.

Although Matkovich missed national selection in 2002, he was again a member of the 4×200-metre freestyle relay in 2003, swimming in the heats at the 2003 World Championships in Barcelona, Spain, where Australia won gold again. In Athens, Matkovich swum in the heats, before the team of Ian Thorpe, Nicholas Sprenger, Grant Hackett and Michael Klim were beaten by the United States team in the final by just 0.13 of a second. He currently coaches water polo and swimming at Aquinas College in Perth.

== See also ==
- List of Olympic medalists in swimming (men)
