= Brian Johns =

Canadian swimmer (born 1982)

Personal information
- Full name: Brian Lawrence Johns
- National team: Canada
- Born: August 5, 1982 (age 43) Regina, Saskatchewan
- Height: 1.85 m (6 ft 1 in)
- Weight: 80 kg (176 lb)

Sport
- Sport: Swimming
- Strokes: Freestyle, medley
- College team: University of British Columbia
Medal record
Men's swimming
Representing Canada
World Championships (LC)
Bronze medal – third place	2007 Melbourne	4×200 m freestyle
World Championships (SC)
Silver medal – second place	2002 Moscow	400 m medley
Bronze medal – third place	1999 Hong Kong	4×200 m freestyle
Pan Pacific Championships
Bronze medal – third place	1999 Sydney	4×200 m freestyle
Bronze medal – third place	2002 Yokohama	4×200 m freestyle
Commonwealth Games
Silver medal – second place	2002 Manchester	400 m medley
Silver medal – second place	2002 Manchester	4×200 m freestyle
Bronze medal – third place	2006 Melbourne	200 m medley
Pan American Games
Bronze medal – third place	1999 Winnipeg	4×200 m freestyle
Universiade
Gold medal – first place	2007 Bangkok	200 m medley

Brian Lawrence Johns (born August 5, 1982) is a former competition swimmer from Canada. Born in Regina, Saskatchewan, he grew up in Richmond, British Columbia and trained with the Aquanauts and Racers (later Rapids) swim clubs. He started swimming at age five. He attended the University of British Columbia, where he was a member of the UBC Thunderbirds varsity swimming team. He held the world record in the 400-metre individual medley (short-course), with a time of 4:02.72. He won a silver medal at the 2002 world championships in Moscow, Russia in the 400-metre individual medley, and a bronze at the 1999 World Championships in Hong Kong in the 4x200-metre freestyle relay.

He was a member of the Canadian team that finished in fifth place in the 4x200-metre freestyle relay at the 2008 Summer Olympics in Beijing.

== Olympic finishes ==
- 2000 Sydney – 15th place 200m IM, 7th place 4 × 200 m freestyle relay
- 2004 Athens – 15th place 400m IM, 5th place 4 × 200 m freestyle relay
- 2008 Beijing – 7th place in 400 IM, 5th place in 4 × 200 m freestyle relay

== See also ==
- List of Commonwealth Games medallists in swimming (men)
- World record progression 400 metres individual medley

Records
Preceded by Matthew Dunn	Men's 400-metre individual medley world record-holder (short course); February 23, 2003 – December 9, 2005	Succeeded by László Cseh
