= Nicholas Sprenger =

Australian swimmer

Personal information
- Full name: Nicholas Sprenger
- National team: Australia
- Born: 14 May 1985 (age 41) Brisbane, Queensland
- Height: 1.90 m (6 ft 3 in)
- Weight: 88 kg (194 lb)

Sport
- Sport: Swimming
- Strokes: Freestyle
- Club: Commercial Swim Club
Medal record
Men's swimming
Representing Australia
Olympic Games
Silver medal – second place	2004 Athens	4×200 m free
World Championships (LC)
Gold medal – first place	2003 Barcelona	4×200 m freestyle
Bronze medal – third place	2005 Montreal	4×200 m freestyle
World Championships (SC)
Gold medal – first place	2008 Manchester	4×200 m freestyle
Silver medal – second place	2004 Indianapolis	4×200 m freestyle

Nicholas Sprenger (born 14 May 1985) is an Australian middle-distance freestyle swimmer who won a silver medal in the 4×200-metre freestyle relay at the 2004 Summer Olympics in Athens.

Coming from Brisbane, Queensland, Sprenger who is coached by Michael Bohl spent the beginning of his career as the understudy of fellow Australians Ian Thorpe and Grant Hackett. After finishing third in the 200-metre freestyle at the 2003 Australian Championships, Sprenger was selected to make his debut at the age of 18 at the 2003 FINA World Championships in Barcelona, Spain, where he was a part of the 4×200-metre freestyle relay team which won gold ahead of the United States team. The following year, he was again third behind Thorpe and Hackett, and was a part of the team alongside Thorpe, Hackett and Michael Klim which was defeated by the Americans in Athens in the 4×200-metre freestyle relay, ending Australia's six-year reign in the event.

In 2005, with Thorpe taking a year off, Sprenger assumed the number 2 middle-distance swimmer role behind Hackett. Despite being involved in a mild car accident in late May, and being prevented from performing the complete training repertoire until one week before the event, Sprenger went on to set gallant personal bests in both the 200-metre and 400-metre events at the 2005 FINA World Championships in Montreal, Canada, in July, placing fifth in the 200-metre event in a time of 1 minute 47.09 seconds. He also collected a bronze medal as part of the 4×200-metre freestyle relay.

In 2006, with Australian captain Hackett sidelined with by a shoulder operation, Sprenger appeared likely to have another opportunity to establish himself as a world-class swimmer. However, he was plagued by a virus and was unable to compete. His cousin Christian Sprenger is a breaststroker who broke the world record in the men's 200-metre breaststroke at the 2009 World Aquatics Championships in Rome.

At the trials for the 2008 Summer Olympics Sprenger came third in the 200-metre freestyle only 0.07 of a second behind Kenrick Monk. However, the winner Grant Hackett was not seeking an individual berth in the event, so Sprenger will compete as Australia's second qualifier in the event at Beijing. He is also a member of the Australian 4×200-metre freestyle team, trying to beat the Americans. However, at the Olympics, Sprenger was eliminated in the semifinals and was then dropped from the relay team, competing in neither the heats nor finals. His colleagues captured the bronze medal in his absence.

== See also ==
- German Australian
- List of Olympic medalists in swimming (men)
