= Rick Say =

Canadian swimmer (born 1979)

Richard Say
Personal information
- Full name: Richard Say
- Nickname: "Ricky cat”
- National team: Canada
- Born: May 18, 1979 (age 47) Salmon Arm, British Columbia
- Height: 1.93 m (6 ft 4 in)
- Weight: 83 kg (183 lb)

Sport
- Sport: Swimming
- Strokes: Freestyle
- Club: Pacific Coast Swimming
- College team: University of Victoria
Medal record
Men's swimming
Representing Canada
World Championships (LC)
Silver medal – second place	2005 Montreal	4×100 m freestyle
Silver medal – second place	2005 Montreal	4×200 m freestyle
Bronze medal – third place	2007 Melbourne	4×200 m freestyle
World Championships (SC)
Silver medal – second place	2004 Indianapolis	200 m freestyle
Bronze medal – third place	1999 Hong Kong	4×200 m freestyle
Bronze medal – third place	2004 Indianapolis	100 m freestyle
Bronze medal – third place	2004 Indianapolis	4×100 m freestyle
Pan Pacific Championships
Silver medal – second place	2006 Victoria	4×100 m freestyle
Bronze medal – third place	1999 Sydney	4×200 m freestyle
Bronze medal – third place	2002 Yokohama	4×100 m freestyle
Bronze medal – third place	2002 Yokohama	4×200 m freestyle
Commonwealth Games
Silver medal – second place	2002 Manchester	4×200 m freestyle
Bronze medal – third place	2002 Manchester	200 m freestyle
Bronze medal – third place	2002 Manchester	4×100 m freestyle
Pan American Games
Bronze medal – third place	1999 Winnipeg	400 m freestyle
Bronze medal – third place	1999 Winnipeg	4×200 m freestyle

Richard Say (born May 18, 1979) is a three-time Olympic and National record-holding swimmer from Canada. Say swam as a child for the Salmon Arm Sockeye Swim Club with his two brothers and two sisters. At the age of 18, he began attending the University of Victoria and started to swim seriously.

Say became a mainstay of the National Swim Team, starting in 1998. His career to date includes 20 national titles and Canadian records in five individual events – 100 free, 200 free, 400 free (scm), 200 free and 400 free (lcm) – not to mention the vast number of national relay records he has been involved in. He has competed for Canada at three Olympic Games (2000, 2004 and 2008), reaching the finals of the 200 freestyle in 2000 and 2004. He has been to four World Championships (2001, 2003, 2005 and 2007) where he was an integral part of Canada's relays which swam in the finals.

At the 2004 World Short Course Championships, Say won three medals – a silver in the 200 free, and bronze in both the 100-metre freestyle and 4x100-metre freestyle relay, both in Canadian record time. At the Commonwealth Games (1998, 2002) he earned one silver medal and two bronze medals. He has been to two Pan Pacific Championships (1999, 2002), winning 3 bronze medals, all in relays and placing a career high 4th for the 200-metre freestyle. At the 1999 Pan American Games, he was a dual bronze medalist in the 400-metre freestyle and 4x200-metre free relay.

At the 2004 Olympics, Say created a minor controversy after the 4×200-metre freestyle relay immediately in the post-race interview which was aired live on national television, when he said that he was "pissed off at not being able to make up for my teammates' mistakes". The other three team members - Brent Hayden, Brian Johns, and Andrew Hurd - expressed disappointment not in the effort, which broke the Canadian record by over 3.5 seconds, but only in the 5th-place finish which was out of the medals.

Say's 4x200-metre freestyle relay, however, bounced back to win two silver medals at the 2005 World Championships in Montreal in 2005.

Since 2004, Say has been less successful, losing his national 200-metre freestyle title to Brent Hayden, from Vancouver, British Columbia. At the 2006 Commonwealth Games in Melbourne, Australia, Say swam a world-class time of 1:48, but finished out of the medals in fourth place.

At the 2008 Summer Olympics, he was a member of the Canadian teams that finished sixth in the 4x100-metre freestyle relay and fifth in the 4x200-metre freestyle relay.

== See also ==
- List of Commonwealth Games medallists in swimming (men)
