= Adam Faulkner (swimmer) =

English swimmer (born 1981)

Personal information
- Full name: Adam Paul Faulkner
- National team: Great Britain
- Born: 26 November 1981 (age 44) Nottingham, England
- Height: 1.86 m (6 ft 1 in)
- Weight: 76 kg (168 lb)

Sport
- Sport: Swimming
- Strokes: Freestyle
- Club: Nova Centurion
- Coach: Bill Furniss
Medal record
Men's swimming
Representing England
Commonwealth Games
| Bronze medal – third place | 2002 Manchester | 4×200 m freestyle |

Adam Paul Faulkner (born 26 November 1981) is an English former competitive swimmer who represented Great Britain in the Olympic Games and competed for England in the Commonwealth Games. Faulkner specialised in long-distance freestyle events. He won a bronze medal, as a member of England swimming team, at the 2002 Commonwealth Games in Manchester, with a final time of 7:22.56.

Faulkner is a member of Nova Centurion Swimming Club in his home city of Nottingham under his coach Bill Furniss, who also trains with Rebecca Adlington.

Faulkner made his official debut at the 2000 Summer Olympics in Sydney, where he competed in the men's 1500 m freestyle. Swimming in heat five, he rounded out the field to last place and twenty-ninth overall on the morning prelims with a time of 15:39.86.

At the 2004 Summer Olympics in Athens, Faulkner swam the 400 m freestyle. He finished first ahead of Graeme Smith from the Olympic trials, in a personal best and an A-standard entry time of 3:49.97. Faulkner challenged seven other swimmers on the fifth heat, including former finalists Grant Hackett of Australia and Dragoş Coman of Romania. He came in only 0.24 of a second behind Coman.

== See also ==
- List of Commonwealth Games medallists in swimming (men)
