= Rafael Mosca =

Brazilian swimmer (born 1982)

Rafael Mósca
Personal information
- Full name: Rafael Motta Bacêllo Mósca
- Nationality: Brazil
- Born: 13 May 1982 (age 44) Rio de Janeiro, Rio de Janeiro, Brazil
- Height: 1.82 m (6 ft 0 in)
- Weight: 80 kg (176 lb)

Sport
- Sport: Swimming
- Strokes: Freestyle
Medal record
Men's swimming
Representing Brazil
World Championships (SC)
Bronze medal – third place	2004 Indianapolis	4x200 m free
Pan American Games
Silver medal – second place	2003 Santo Domingo	4 x 200 m free

Rafael Motta Bacêllo Mósca (born 13 May 1982, in Rio de Janeiro) is a freestyle swimmer from Brazil.

Trying to prevent some respiratory problem, Mósca began to practice swimming. His mother enrolled him in a swim school at two years of age. At 11, a disease in kidney removed him from swimming pools, for a year and a half. Recovered, returned to swim at Flamengo. The first good results of Rafael appeared, and he began to consider the possibility of a career as a professional athlete.

At 19 years old, he broke the 10-year hegemony of Gustavo Borges in the 200-metre freestyle, at the 2002 Jose Finkel Trophy (Brazilian Short Course Championship). Gustavo won the gold medal since 1992.

Mósca swam at the 2002 Pan Pacific Swimming Championships, where he finished 4th in the 4×100-metre freestyle, 5th in the 4×200-metre freestyle, and 14th in the 200-metre freestyle.

At the 2003 World Aquatics Championships, in Barcelona, Mósca finished 33rd in the 200-metre freestyle and 9th in the 4×200-metre freestyle.

He won the silver medal with the men's relay team in the 4×200-metre freestyle at the 2003 Pan American Games in Santo Domingo, Dominican Republic. His winning teammates were Carlos Jayme, Gustavo Borges, and Rodrigo Castro. He also finished 7th in the 200-metre freestyle.

Mósca also represented his native country at the 2004 Summer Olympics in Athens, Greece. In which he achieved 9th place also with the men's relay team in the 4×200-metre freestyle, now with Bruno Bonfim, Carlos Jayme and Rodrigo Castro. At this race, he broke the South American record, with a time of 7:22.70.

At the 2004 FINA World Swimming Championships (25 m) in Indianapolis, Mósca won the bronze medal in the 4×200-metre freestyle, along with Rodrigo Castro, Thiago Pereira and Lucas Salatta, beating the South American record, with a time of 7:06.64. He also finished 19th in the 200-metre freestyle.
