= Ashley Callus =

Australian swimmer (born 1979)

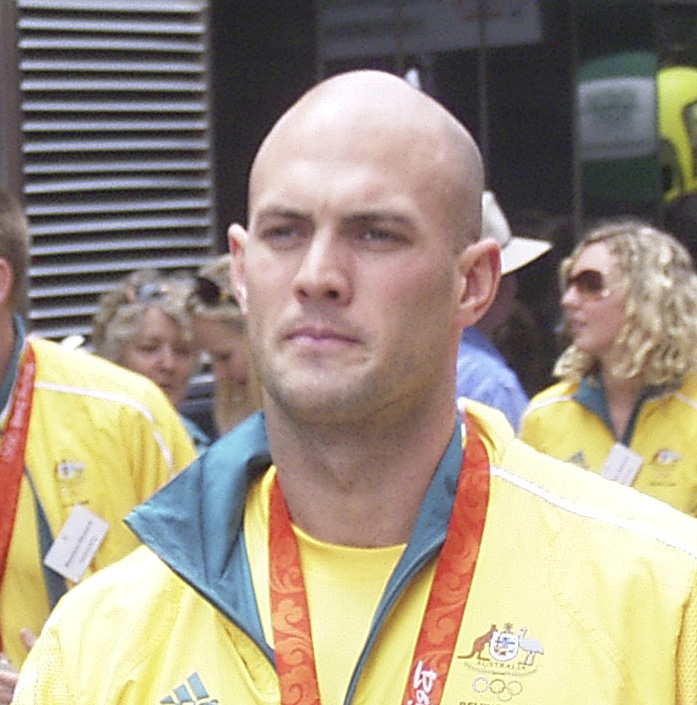

Personal information
- Full name: Ashley John Callus
- National team: Australia
- Born: 10 March 1979 (age 47) Brisbane, Queensland
- Height: 1.88 m (6 ft 2 in)
- Weight: 85 kg (187 lb)

Sport
- Sport: Swimming
- Strokes: Freestyle
- Club: Redlands Swimming Club
Medal record
Men's swimming
Representing Australia
Olympic Games
Gold medal – first place	2000 Sydney	4×100 m freestyle
Bronze medal – third place	2008 Beijing	4×100 m freestyle
World Championships (LC)
Gold medal – first place	2001 Fukuoka	4×100 m freestyle
Gold medal – first place	2001 Fukuoka	4×100 m medley
World Championships (SC)
Gold medal – first place	2002 Moscow	100 m freestyle
Gold medal – first place	2006 Shanghai	4×100 m medley
Silver medal – second place	2002 Moscow	4×100 m medley
Goodwill Games
Gold medal – first place	2001 Brisbane	4×100 m freestyle
Silver medal – second place	2001 Brisbane	100 m freestyle
Pan Pacific Championships
Gold medal – first place	2002 Yokohama	4×100 m freestyle
Silver medal – second place	2002 Yokohama	100 m freestyle
Commonwealth Games
Gold medal – first place	1998 Kuala Lumpur	4×100 m freestyle
Gold medal – first place	2002 Manchester	4×100 m freestyle
Silver medal – second place	2002 Manchester	100 m freestyle
Silver medal – second place	2006 Melbourne	4×100 m freestyle

Ashley John Callus OAM (born 10 March 1979) is an Australian former sprint freestyle swimmer, who won a gold medal in the 4 × 100 m freestyle relay at the 2000 Sydney Olympics.

Coming from Brisbane, Queensland, and of Maltese origin, Callus, graduated in Iona College, he was coached by Chris Urquhart, spent the beginning of his career as the understudy of fellow Australians Michael Klim and Chris Fydler. After finishing fourth in the 100 m freestyle at the 2000 Australian Championships, Callus was selected to make his debut at the age of 21 at the 2000 Sydney Olympics in the 4 × 100 m freestyle relay.

== 2000 Olympics ==
Swimming with Klim, Fydler and Ian Thorpe, the Australians were not expected to win, as the United States had never lost the event at Olympic level. However, cheered on by a raucous home crowd, Klim set a world record 48.18 s in the leadoff leg, before Fydler maintained the lead, handing Callus a half-body length lead over Jason Lezak. Callus did well to stave off the faster and more experienced Lezak, giving Thorpe a slender lead. The fast-finishing Thorpe managed to overhaul the fast-starting Gary Hall Jr. by a handspan, sealing a gold medal in a world record time of 3:13.67, almost two seconds faster than the previous world mark.

At the 2001 World Championships in Fukuoka, Japan, he was again part of the 4 × 100 m freestyle relay team which won gold ahead of the United States, and was also a finalist in the 100 m freestyle. The following year, 2002 saw his finest moment as he won individual gold at the 2002 World Short Course Championships in Moscow, Russia in the 100 m freestyle.

== 2004 Olympics ==
In 2004, Callus qualified to represent Australia for both the 50 m and 100 m freestyle, as well as the relays at the National Trials, swimming to his usual standards. However, at the Athens Olympics, Callus swum much slower in the heats of his individual events and was a long margin from even qualifying for the semi-finals. He was ignominiously dropped from the final of the 4 × 100 m freestyle relay, where Australia came sixth. It was revealed that he had contracted the Epstein-Barr virus and he took a year off to recover, returning in late 2005, declaring that he had completely overcome his illness. He has gained selection for the 2006 Commonwealth Games in Melbourne.

At the 2006 Commonwealth Games, Callus anchored the 4 × 100 m freestyle relay team to silver, and also reached the final of both the 50 m and 100 m freestyle, although he was considerably outside his best time in both events. He took a new gold for Australia in the 2006 World Short Course Championships at 4 × 100 m medley relay, in Shanghai, China, April 2006.

== 2008 Olympics ==
At the 2008 Summer Olympics, Callus was part of the Australian 4 × 100 m freestyle relay team, which won the bronze medal in the event. He also took part in the 50m freestyle finishing a close 4th. In a post swim interview, he said he would not return for a 4th Olympics.

=== Successful Return ===
Callus made a return in 2009 at the Aus trials, despite clocking thunderous times in the prelims and semi-finals, he failed to beat the younger generation of sprinters in Eamon Sullivan & Matthew Abood. In a post swim interview he claimed due to the slow real estate market he had more free time to return to the pool.

After what most swimming fans assumed was a quiet retirement, Callus made an unexpected return to the Australian short course championships, clocking a new Australian record in the 50m freestyle.

On 26 November at the 2009 International AIS meet, Callus broke Sullivan's Australian record (former world record) in the men's 50m freestyle to clock 21.24 in the mourning prelims. For the second time in a day, taking 0.05 off the mark in the finals and bringing it down to 21.19, making him the 3rd fastest swimmer in history. "At the end of the day it's great to do fast times and see what I can possibly do, and that would have won a medal at Worlds," said Callus.

At the 2010 Telstra Trials he won the 50m freestyle in a time of 22.09, at the 2010 Pan Pacs he finished 7th in 22.15. At the 2010 Commonwealth Games he was disqualified in the semi-finals. "It's one of those things," he said. "That's bitterly disappointing ... I could have been up on the dais because I knew I was in good form." Asked if that was his last swim: "Definitely in the Commonwealth Games format. As they say, shit happens."

== Career best times ==
Long Course personal bests
Event	Time	Record
50m Freestyle	21.19	Former Aus Record Holder
100m Freestyle	48.68	

Short Course personal bests
Event	Time	Record
50m Freestyle	20.98	Former Aus Record Holder
100m Freestyle	46.99	Former Aus Record Holder

== See also ==
- List of Commonwealth Games medallists in swimming (men)
- List of Olympic medalists in swimming (men)
- World record progression 4 × 100 metres freestyle relay
