= Mark Johnston (swimmer) =

Canadian swimmer (born 1979)

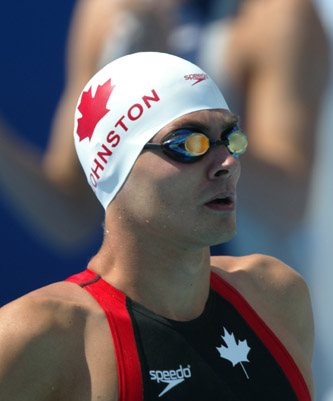

Personal information
- Full name: Mark Johnston
- National team: Canada
- Born: August 31, 1979 (age 46) St. Catharines, Ontario
- Height: 1.96 m (6 ft 5 in)
- Weight: 85 kg (187 lb)

Sport
- Sport: Swimming
- Strokes: Freestyle
- Club: Pacific Dolphins; Brock Niagara Aquatics
- College team: University of British Columbia
Medal record
Men's swimming
Representing Canada
World Championships (SC)
Bronze medal – third place	1999 Hong Kong	4x200 m freestyle
Bronze medal – third place	2002 Moscow	200 m freestyle
Commonwealth Games
Silver medal – second place	2002 Manchester	4x200 m freestyle
Pan Pacific Championships
Bronze medal – third place	1999 Sydney	4x200 m freestyle
Bronze medal – third place	2002 Yokohama	4x200 m freestyle
Pan American Games
Bronze medal – third place	1999 Winnipeg	200 m freestyle
Bronze medal – third place	1999 Winnipeg	4x200 m freestyle

Mark Johnston (born August 31, 1979) is a former freestyle swimmer from Canada, who competed at two consecutive Summer Olympic Games, Sydney, Australia in 2000 and Athens, Greece in 2004. Johnston's consecutive 10-year run on the Canadian national team was longer than any other current swimmer at the time. Born and raised in St. Catharines, Ontario, he was named to the national team in 1996 while swimming for Swim Brock Niagara (now Brock Niagara Aquatics). He went on to win numerous medals on the world stage throughout his career representing Canada at two Commonwealth Games, five World Championships, the Pan-American Games, three Pan-Pacific Aquatic Championships, and several other major international competitions. He is a 14-time national champion, world championship bronze medallist and Olympic finalist in the men's 4 x 200-metre freestyle relay. Mark attended the University of British Columbia and was inducted into the St. Catharines Sports Hall of Fame in 2017.

Post Olympic Career: Leading up to his retirement in 2005, Mark helped pilot the RBC Olympians program in 2004, a program supporting Canada’s top athletes by providing them opportunities for career development, financial support and personal brand exposure in a partnership that prioritizes training schedules and overall wellness. Mark continued on with RBC, earning his designation as a Personal Financial Planner and has held various senior roles in the Royal Bank of Canada including Manager, Investment & Retirement Planning and Senior Manager, Digital Strategy & Experience. Mark volunteers extensively in the community, has been on various board of directors and is most proud of his time supporting the triathlon community and coaching aquatics for BC School Sports.

Career Highlights:

- Canadian National Swim Team Member from 1996 to 2005
- 14-Time National Champion in the 200, 400 and 1500 Freestyle
- Bronze Medallist at the 1999 and 2002 FINA World Swimming Championships
- Finalist at the 2000 and 2004 Olympic Games
- Silver Medallist at the 2002 Commonwealth Games
- CIS: Canadian Interuniversity Sport Athletic All Canadian
- 23 Medals (16 Gold) at the CIS Swimming Championships
- St. Catharines Sports Hall of Fame Inductee, 2017
- University of British Columbia Sports Hall of Fame Inductee, 2015
- Denis Morris High School Hall of Fame Inductee, 2000
- St. Catharines Athlete of the Year, 1999
- 2-Time RBC performance convention winner

Community Involvement:

- Vancouver Technical Secondary School Aquatics Coach, 2021 - present
- Gladstone Secondary School Aquatics Coach, 2021 - present
- Exceleration Triathlon and Multisport Board Member, 2017 - present

== See also ==
- List of Commonwealth Games medallists in swimming (men)
