= Craig Stevens (swimmer) =

Australian swimmer

Personal information
- Full name: Craig Julian Stevens
- National team: Australia
- Born: 23 July 1980 (age 46) Sydney
- Height: 1.88 m (6 ft 2 in)
- Weight: 82 kg (181 lb)

Sport
- Sport: Swimming
- Strokes: Freestyle
- Club: Sutherland Leisure Aquadot
Medal record
Men's swimming
Representing Australia
Olympic Games
Silver medal – second place	2004 Athens	4×200m freestyle
World Championships (LC)
Gold medal – first place	2003 Barcelona	4×200m freestyle
Silver medal – second place	2007 Melbourne	800m freestyle
World Championships (SC)
Gold medal – first place	2002 Moscow	4×200m freestyle
Goodwill Games
Bronze medal – third place	2001 Brisbane	400m freestyle
Bronze medal – third place	2001 Brisbane	1500m freestyle
Pan Pacific Championships
Gold medal – first place	2002 Yokohama	4×200 m freestyle
Commonwealth Games
Bronze medal – third place	2002 Manchester	1500m freestyle

Craig Julian Stevens (born 23 July 1980) is an Australian former freestyle swimmer specialising in the 400m, 800m and 1500m freestyle events. He was an Australian Institute of Sport scholarship holder.

Stevens was the bronze medallist in the 1500m freestyle event at the 2002 Commonwealth Games, but he narrowly missed out on a medal in the 400m freestyle, finishing 4th.

In 2004, Stevens made his Olympic Games debut at Athens. There, he won silver as part of the Australian 4×200m relay team and also made the final in the 1500m. He relinquished his place in the 400m freestyle for world record holder Ian Thorpe, who had been disqualified from the event at the Australian trials.

Stevens was initially left out of the Australian team for the 2006 Commonwealth Games in his home country. However, Ian Thorpe had to withdraw from the games due to illness, which allowed Stevens to take Thorpe's place in the team. After qualifying as the fastest heat swimmer, he again came 4th in the 400m freestyle final. He also contested the 1500m freestyle final and finished in 6th place.

In March 2007, Stevens won his first World Championship medal after finishing 3rd in the 800m freestyle final with a personal best time of 7:48.67. After the disqualification of Oussama Mellouli, Stevens was elevated to 2nd. At the same meet, he also broke the 15-minute barrier in the 1500m freestyle for the first time, finishing 6th in the final with a time of 14:59.11.

Stevens qualified for the Australian Olympic swimming team for the Beijing 2008 Summer Olympics on 29 March 2008 at the Australian Olympic Qualifiers at Homebush in Sydney. He qualified for both the 400m and 1500m freestyle events. He finished 2nd behind Grant Hackett in the 1500m with a personal best of 14:53.18, making him the third fastest Australian 1500m swimmer in history.

Stevens failed to qualify for the finals of the 400m freestyle at the Olympics as he was comprehensively out-swum, finishing in 8th place in heat three, 7 seconds behind the winner. In the 1500m freestyle, Stevens again failed to make the finals finishing 5th in heat four, some 17 seconds behind the winner and 8 seconds outside of his personal best.

== Post-retirement life ==
Stevens retired from competitive swimming in 2008. After retiring from swimming, he worked first as a bank teller and then for Toyota. He is now head swimming coach at Sans Souci Leisure Centre in Sans Souci, New South Wales.

== See also ==
- List of Commonwealth Games medallists in swimming (men)
- List of Olympic medalists in swimming (men)
