= 2002 Pan Pacific Swimming Championships =

International swimming competition

- Host city: Yokohama, Japan
- Date: August 24–29, 2002
- Venue: Yokohama International Swimming Pool
- Events: 34

The ninth edition of the Pan Pacific Swimming Championships, a long course (50 m) event, was held in 2002 in Yokohama International Swimming Pool in Yokohama, Japan, from August 24–29. One world record was set over the six-day competition.

== Results ==
=== Men's events ===
Event	Gold		Silver		Bronze	
50 m freestyle	Jason Lezak (USA)	22.22	Anthony Ervin (USA)	22.28	Brett Hawke (AUS)	22.40
100 m freestyle	Ian Thorpe (AUS)	48.84	Ashley Callus (AUS)	49.26	Nate Dusing (USA)	49.47
200 m freestyle	Ian Thorpe (AUS)	1:44.75; CR	Grant Hackett (AUS)	1:45.84	Nate Dusing (USA)	1:48.11
400 m freestyle	Ian Thorpe (AUS)	3:45.28	Grant Hackett (AUS)	3:45.99	Klete Keller (USA)	3:48.40
800 m freestyle	Grant Hackett (AUS)	7:44.78; CR	Larsen Jensen (USA)	7:52.05; AM	Chris Thompson (USA)	7:56.69
1500 m freestyle	Grant Hackett (AUS)	14:41.65; CR	Erik Vendt (USA)	15:02.24	Larsen Jensen (USA)	15:05.17
100 m backstroke	Aaron Peirsol (USA)	54.22	Randall Bal (USA)	54.45	Tomomi Morita (JPN)	55.29
200 m backstroke	Aaron Peirsol (USA)	1:56.88	Matt Welsh (AUS)	1:57.69	Keith Beavers (CAN)	1:59.35
100 m breaststroke	Kosuke Kitajima (JPN)	1:00.36	Brendan Hansen (USA)	1:00.84	Jim Piper (AUS)	1:01.68
200 m breaststroke	Brendan Hansen (USA)	2:11.80	Jim Piper (AUS)	2:12.53	Daisuke Kimura (JPN)	2:12.71
100 m butterfly	Ian Crocker (USA)	52.45	Geoff Huegill (AUS)	52.48	Mike Mintenko (CAN)	52.69
200 m butterfly	Tom Malchow (USA)	1:55.21; CR	Michael Phelps (USA)	1:55.41	Takashi Yamamoto (JPN)	1:55.57
200 m individual medley	Michael Phelps (USA)	1:59.70; CR	Takahiro Mori (JPN)	2:00.61	Tom Wilkens (USA)	2:01.17
400 m individual medley	Michael Phelps (USA)	4:12.48; CR	Erik Vendt (USA)	4:13.15	Takahiro Mori (JPN)	4:16.35
4×100 m freestyle relay	Australia; Ashley Callus (49.26); Todd Pearson (48.92); Grant Hackett (49.05); Ian Thorpe (47.92)	3:15.15	United States; Anthony Ervin (50.30); Scott Tucker (48.66); Nate Dusing (48.53); Jason Lezak (47.92)	3:15.41	Canada; Yannick Lupien (49.90); Mike Mintenko (49.66); Rick Say (49.73); Brent Hayden (48.40)	3:17.69; NR
4×200 m freestyle relay	Australia; Grant Hackett (1:46.60); Craig Stevens (1:48.35); Jason Cram (1:49.25); Ian Thorpe (1:44.80)	7:09.00	United States; Nate Dusing (1:49.00); Klete Keller (1:47.31); Michael Phelps (1:47.49); Chad Carvin (1:48.01)	7:11.81; AM	Canada; Rick Say (1:49.71); Mike Mintenko (1:49.37); Mark Johnston (1:49.41); Brian Johns (1:48.81)	7:17.30
4×100 m medley relay	United States; Aaron Peirsol (54.17); Brendan Hansen (1:00.14); Michael Phelps (51.13); Jason Lezak (48.04)	3:33.48; WR	Australia; Matt Welsh (54.52); Jim Piper (1:01.43); Geoff Huegill (51.69); Ian Thorpe (47.20)	3:34.84; OC	Canada; Riley Janes (56.07); Mike Brown (1:01.01); Mike Mintenko (51.91); Brent Hayden (48.58)	3:38.17; NR

=== Women's events ===
Event	Gold		Silver		Bronze	
50 m freestyle	Jenny Thompson (USA)	25.13	Jodie Henry (AUS)	25.32	Tammie Stone (USA)	25.42
100 m freestyle	Natalie Coughlin (USA)	53.99; CR, AM	Jodie Henry (AUS)	54.55; OC	Jenny Thompson (USA)	54.75
200 m freestyle	Lindsay Benko (USA)	1:58.74	Elka Graham (AUS)	1:59.72	Giaan Rooney (AUS)	1:59.82
400 m freestyle	Diana Munz (USA)	4:09.50	Lindsay Benko (USA)	4:10.28	Sachiko Yamada (JPN)	4:10.79
800 m freestyle	Diana Munz (USA)	8:30.45	Sachiko Yamada (JPN)	8:31.89	Hayley Peirsol (USA)	8:32.27
1500 m freestyle	Diana Munz (USA)	16:07.86	Sachiko Yamada (JPN)	16:16.28	Morgan Hentzen (USA)	16:29.25
100 m backstroke	Natalie Coughlin (USA)	59.72; CR	Dyana Calub (AUS)	1:01.49; OC	Haley Cope (USA)	1:01.74
200 m backstroke	Margaret Hoelzer (USA)	2:11.00	Aya Terakawa (JPN)	2:12.28	Jennifer Fratesi (CAN)	2:12.71
100 m breaststroke	Amanda Beard (USA)	1:08.22	Tara Kirk (USA)	1:08.66	Luo Xuejuan (CHN)	1:08.70
200 m breaststroke	Amanda Beard (USA)	2:26.31	Leisel Jones (AUS)	2:26.42	Kristy Kowal (USA)	2:27.59
100 m butterfly	Natalie Coughlin (USA)	57.88 =CR	Petria Thomas (AUS)	58.11	Jenny Thompson (USA)	58.64
200 m butterfly	Petria Thomas (AUS)	2:08.31	Mary DeScenza (USA)	2:09.56	Emily Mason (USA)	2:10.59
200 m individual medley	Tomoko Hagiwara (JPN)	2:13.42	Gabrielle Rose (USA)	2:13.93	Maggie Bowen (USA)	2:14.28
400 m individual medley	Jennifer Reilly (AUS)	4:40.84; OC	Maggie Bowen (USA)	4:44.39	Maiko Fujino (JPN)	4:45.79
4×100 m freestyle relay	Australia; Jodie Henry (54.94); Alice Mills (55.15); Petria Thomas (55.35); Sarah Ryan (54.34)	3:39.78; CR, OC	United States; Lindsay Benko (55.35); Natalie Coughlin (54.69); Rhi Jeffrey (55.34); Jenny Thompson (54.85)	3:40.23	Japan; Tomoko Hagiwara (54.97); Tomoko Nagai (55.10); Norie Urabe (56.28); Kaori Yamada (55.88)	3:42.23; NR
4×200 m freestyle relay	United States; Natalie Coughlin (1:58.21); Elizabeth Hill (2:00.92); Diana Munz (1:59.58); Lindsay Benko (1:58.25)	7:56.96; CR, AM	Australia; Petria Thomas (1:59.77); Elka Graham (1:59.14); Giaan Rooney (1:59.72); Alice Mills (2:00.62)	7:59.25	Japan; Tomoko Nagai (2:01.60); Sachiko Yamada (2:00.46); Norie Urabe (2:01.85); Maki Mita (2:00.10)	8:04.01
4×100 m medley relay	Australia; Dyana Calub (1:01.98); Leisel Jones (1:07.51); Petria Thomas (56.94); Jodie Henry (54.07)	4:00.50; CR, OC	United States; Natalie Coughlin (1:00.09); Amanda Beard (1:07.76); Jenny Thompson (58.32); Lindsay Benko (54.98)	4:01.15	Canada; Erin Gammel (1:02.32); Rhiannon Leier (1:09.22); Jen Button (59.16); Laura Nicholls (54.99)	4:05.69; NR

== Medal table ==
Rank	Nation	Gold	Silver	Bronze	Total
1	United States (USA)	21	16	15	52
2	Australia (AUS)	11	14	3	28
3	Japan (JPN)	2	4	8	14
4	Canada (CAN)	0	0	7	7
5	China (CHN)	0	0	1	1
Totals (5 entries)		34	34	34	102
