= List of individual gold medalists in swimming at the Olympics and World Aquatics Championships (men) =

This is an overview of the men's swimming champions in individual events at the Olympics and the World Aquatics Championships. These tournaments are the only global long course (50 meter pool) swimming championships organized by world swimming federation FINA. This list gives an overview of the dominant swimmers throughout the history of swimming.

Currently, the Olympic program includes 14 individual events, and the World Championships program 17. These numbers were lower in the past, as shown in the table.

Asterisks (*) link to the event article. Use the sort function in the left-hand column to separate Olympics and World Championships.

Year	Freestyle						Backstroke			Breaststroke			Butterfly			Individual medley	
Year	50 m	100 m	200 m	400 m	800 m	1500 m	50 m	100 m	200 m	50 m	100 m	200 m	50 m	100 m	200 m	200 m	400 m
OG 1896	–	Hajós*	–	Neumann* (500 m)	–	Hajós* (1200 m)	–	–	–	–	–	–	–	–	–	–	–
OG 1900	–	–	Lane*	–	Jarvis* (1000 m)	–	–	–	Hoppenberg*	–	–	–	–	–	–	–	–
OG 1904	Halmay* (50 yd)	Halmay* (100 yd)	Daniels* (220 yd)	Daniels* (440 yd)	Rausch* (880 yd)	Rausch* (1 mile)	–	Brack* (100 yd)	–	–	–	–	–	–	–	–	–
OG 1908	–	Daniels*	–	Taylor*	–	Taylor*	–	Bieberstein*	–	–	–	Holman*	–	–	–	–	–
OG 1912	–	Kahanamoku*	–	Hodgson*	–	Hodgson*	–	Hebner*	–	–	–	Bathe*	–	–	–	–	–
OG 1920	–	Kahanamoku*	–	Ross*	–	Ross*	–	Kealoha*	–	–	–	Malmrot*	–	–	–	–	–
OG 1924	–	Weissmuller*	–	Weissmuller*	–	Charlton*	–	Kealoha*	–	–	–	Skelton*	–	–	–	–	–
OG 1928	–	Weissmuller*	–	Zorrilla*	–	Borg*	–	Kojac*	–	–	–	Tsuruta*	–	–	–	–	–
OG 1932	–	Miyazaki*	–	Crabbe*	–	Kitamura*	–	Kiyokawa*	–	–	–	Tsuruta*	–	–	–	–	–
OG 1936	–	Csik*	–	Medica*	–	Terada*	–	Kiefer*	–	–	–	Hamuro*	–	–	–	–	–
OG 1948	–	Ris*	–	Smith*	–	McLane*	–	Stack*	–	–	–	Verdeur*	–	–	–	–	–
OG 1952	–	Scholes*	–	Boiteux*	–	Konno*	–	Oyakawa*	–	–	–	Davies*	–	–	–	–	–
OG 1956	–	Henricks*	–	Rose*	–	Rose*	–	Theile*	–	–	–	Furukawa*	–	–	Yorzyk*	–	–
OG 1960	–	Devitt*	–	Rose*	–	Konrads*	–	Theile*	–	–	–	Mulliken*	–	–	Troy*	–	–
OG 1964	–	Schollander*	–	Schollander*	–	Windle*	–	–	Graef*	–	–	O'Brien*	–	–	Berry*	–	Roth*
OG 1968	–	Wenden*	Wenden*	Burton*	–	Burton*	–	Matthes*	Matthes*	–	McKenzie*	Muñoz*	–	Russell*	Robie*	Hickcox*	Hickcox*
OG 1972	–	Spitz*	Spitz*	Cooper*	–	Burton*	–	Matthes*	Matthes*	–	Taguchi*	Hencken*	–	Spitz*	Spitz*	Larsson*	Larsson*
WC 1973	–	Montgomery*	Montgomery*	DeMont*	–	Holland*	–	Matthes*	Matthes*	–	Hencken*	Wilkie*	–	Robertson*	Backhaus*	Larsson*	Hargitay*
WC 1975	–	Coan*	Shaw*	Shaw*	–	Shaw*	–	Matthes*	Verrasztó*	–	Wilkie*	Wilkie*	–	Jagenburg*	Forrester*	Hargitay*	Hargitay*
OG 1976	–	Montgomery*	Furniss*	Goodell*	–	Goodell*	–	Naber*	Naber*	–	Hencken*	Wilkie*	–	Vogel*	Bruner*	–	Strachan*
WC 1978	–	McCagg*	Forrester*	Salnikov*	–	Salnikov*	–	Jackson*	Vassallo*	–	Kusch*	Nevid*	–	Bottom*	Bruner*	Smith*	Vassallo*
OG 1980	–	Woithe*	Koplyakov*	Salnikov*	–	Salnikov*	–	Baron*	Wladár*	–	Goodhew*	Žulpa*	–	Arvidsson*	Fesenko*	–	Sydorenko*
WC 1982	–	Woithe*	Gross*	Salnikov*	–	Salnikov*	–	Richter*	Carey*	–	Lundquist*	Davis*	–	Gribble*	Gross*	Sydorenko*	Prado*
OG 1984	–	Gaines*	Gross*	DiCarlo*	–	O'Brien*	–	Carey*	Carey*	–	Lundquist*	Davis*	–	Gross*	Sieben*	Baumann*	Baumann*
WC 1986	Jager*	Biondi*	Gross*	Henkel*	–	Henkel*	–	Polyansky*	Polyansky*	–	Davis*	Szabó*	–	Morales*	Gross*	Darnyi*	Darnyi*
OG 1988	Biondi*	Biondi*	Armstrong*	Dassler*	–	Salnikov*	–	Suzuki*	Polyansky*	–	Moorhouse*	Szabó*	–	Nesty*	Gross*	Darnyi*	Darnyi*
WC 1991	Jager*	Biondi*	Lamberti*	Hoffmann*	–	Hoffmann*	–	Rouse*	López-Zubero*	–	Rózsa*	Barrowman*	–	Nesty*	Stewart*	Darnyi*	Darnyi*
OG 1992	Popov*	Popov*	Sadovyi*	Sadovyi*	–	Perkins*	–	Tewksbury*	López-Zubero*	–	Diebel*	Barrowman*	–	Morales*	Stewart*	Darnyi*	Darnyi*
WC 1994	Popov*	Popov*	Kasvio*	Perkins*	–	Perkins*	–	López-Zubero*	Selkov*	–	Rózsa*	Rózsa*	–	Szukała*	Pankratov*	Sievinen*	Dolan*
OG 1996	Popov*	Popov*	Loader*	Loader*	–	Perkins*	–	Rouse*	Bridgewater*	–	Deburgh-graeve*	Rózsa*	–	Pankratov*	Pankratov*	Czene*	Dolan*
WC 1998	Pilczuk*	Popov*	Klim*	Thorpe*	–	Hackett*	–	Krayzelburg*	Krayzelburg*	–	Deburgh-graeve*	Grote*	–	Klim*	Sylantyev*	Wouda*	Dolan*
OG 2000	Ervin & Hall, Jr.*	Van den Hoogenband*	Van den Hoogenband*	Thorpe*	–	Hackett*	–	Krayzelburg*	Krayzelburg*	–	Fioravanti*	Fioravanti*	–	Frölander*	Malchow*	Rosolino*	Dolan*
WC 2001	Ervin*	Ervin*	Thorpe*	Thorpe*	Thorpe*	Hackett*	Bal*	Welsh*	Peirsol*	Lisohor*	Sludnov*	Hansen*	Huegill*	Frölander*	Phelps*	Rosolino*	Boggiatto*
WC 2003	Popov*	Popov*	Thorpe*	Thorpe*	Hackett*	Hackett*	Rupprath*	Peirsol*	Peirsol*	Gibson*	Kitajima*	Kitajima*	Welsh*	Crocker*	Phelps*	Phelps*	Phelps*
OG 2004	Hall, Jr.*	Van den Hoogenband*	Thorpe*	Thorpe*	–	Hackett*	–	Peirsol*	Peirsol*	–	Kitajima*	Kitajima*	–	Phelps*	Phelps*	Phelps*	Phelps*
WC 2005	Schoeman*	Magnini*	Phelps*	Hackett*	Hackett*	Hackett*	Grigoriadis*	Peirsol*	Peirsol*	Warnecke*	Hansen*	Hansen*	Schoeman*	Crocker*	Korze-niowski*	Phelps*	Cseh*
WC 2007	Wildman-Tobriner*	Hayden & Magnini*	Phelps*	Park*	Stańczyk*	Sawry-mowicz*	Zandberg*	Peirsol*	Lochte*	Lisohor*	Hansen*	Kitajima*	Schoeman*	Phelps*	Phelps*	Phelps*	Phelps*
OG 2008	Cielo*	Bernard*	Phelps*	Park*	–	Mellouli*	–	Peirsol*	Lochte*	–	Kitajima*	Kitajima*	–	Phelps*	Phelps*	Phelps*	Phelps*
WC 2009	Cielo*	Cielo*	Biedermann*	Biedermann*	Zhang*	Mellouli*	Tancock*	Koga*	Peirsol*	Van der Burgh*	Rickard*	Gyurta*	Čavić*	Phelps*	Phelps*	Lochte*	Lochte*
WC 2011	Cielo*	Magnussen*	Lochte*	Park*	Sun*	Sun*	Tancock*	Lacourt & Stravius*	Lochte*	França Silva*	Dale Oen*	Gyurta*	Cielo*	Phelps*	Phelps*	Lochte*	Lochte*
OG 2012	Manaudou*	Adrian*	Agnel*	Sun*	–	Sun*	–	Grevers*	Clary*	–	Van der Burgh*	Gyurta*	–	Phelps*	Le Clos*	Phelps*	Lochte*
WC 2013	Cielo*	Magnussen*	Agnel*	Sun*	Sun*	Sun*	Lacourt*	Grevers*	Lochte*	Van der Burgh*	Sprenger*	Gyurta*	Cielo*	Le Clos*	Le Clos*	Lochte*	Seto*
WC 2015	Manaudou*	Ning*	Guy*	Sun*	Sun*	Paltrinieri*	Lacourt*	Larkin*	Larkin*	Peaty*	Peaty*	Koch*	Manaudou*	Le Clos*	Cseh*	Lochte*	Seto*
OG 2016	Ervin*	Chalmers*	Sun*	Horton*	–	Paltrinieri*	–	Murphy*	Murphy*	–	Peaty*	Balandin*	–	Schooling*	Phelps*	Phelps*	Hagino*
WC 2017	Dressel*	Dressel*	Sun*	Sun*	Detti*	Paltrinieri*	Lacourt*	Xu*	Rylov*	Peaty*	Peaty*	Chupkov*	Proud*	Dressel*	Le Clos*	Kalisz*	Kalisz*
WC 2019	Dressel*	Dressel*	Sun*	Sun*	Paltrinieri*	Wellbrock*	Waddell*	Xu*	Rylov*	Peaty*	Peaty*	Chupkov*	Dressel*	Dressel*	Milák*	Seto*	Seto*
OG 2020	Dressel*	Dressel*	Dean*	Hafnaoui*	Finke*	Finke*	–	Rylov*	Rylov*	–	Peaty*	Stubblety-Cook*	–	Dressel*	Milák*	Wang*	Kalisz*
WC 2022	Proud*	Popovici*	Popovici*	Winnington*	Finke*	Paltrinieri*	Ress*	Ceccon*	Murphy*	Fink*	Martinenghi*	Stubblety-Cook*	Dressel*	Milák*	Milák*	Marchand*	Marchand*
WC 2023	McEvoy*	Chalmers*	Richards*	Short*	Hafnaoui*	Hafnaoui*	Armstrong*	Murphy*	Kós*	Qin*	Qin*	Qin*	Ceccon*	Grousset*	Marchand*	Marchand*	Marchand*
WC 2024	Bukhov*	Pan*	Hwang*	Kim*	Wiffen*	Wiffen*	Cooper*	Armstrong*	González*	Williamson*	Fink*	Dong*	Ribeiro*	Ribeiro*	Honda*	Knox*	Clareburt*
OG 2024	McEvoy*	Pan*	Popovici*	Märtens*	Wiffen*	Finke*	–	Ceccon*	Kós*	–	Martinenghi*	Marchand*	–	Milák*	Marchand*	Marchand*	Marchand*
WC 2025	McEvoy*	Popovici*	Popovici*	Märtens*	Jaouadi*	Jaouadi*	Kolesnikov*	Coetze*	Kós*	Cerasuolo*	Qin*	Qin*	Grousset*	Grousset*	Urlando*	Marchand*	Marchand*

Note: Only events that are presently contested have their own column in the above table. In some of the early Olympics, events were held that have been discontinued later on. Where possible, the champions in these events have been placed in a column corresponding to the nearest distance. In those cases the actual distance is added below the champion's name. Champions not included in the table are:

- OG 1896. 100 m freestyle for sailors: Malokinis
- OG 1900. 4000 m freestyle: Jarvis, 200 m obstacle: Lane, underwater: Devendeville
- OG 1904. 440 yd breaststroke: Zacharias
- OG 1912. 400 m breaststroke: Bathe
- OG 1920. 400 m breaststroke: Malmrot

== Title leaders ==
- The leaders in these events are listed below. All swimmers with at least three individual titles are included. Note that this list favors more recent swimmers due to the increasing number of events held, and the introduction and increasing frequency of the World Championships.

Asterisks (*) and bold denote active swimmers

Rank	Name	Year of birth	Total titles	Olympic Games	World Championships	Time span
1.	(United States) Michael Phelps	1985	28	13	15	2001–2016 (16)
2.	(China) **Sun Yang***	1991	14	3	11	2011–2019 (9)
3.	(United States) Ryan Lochte	1984	12	2	10	2007–2015 (9)
4.	(France) **Léon Marchand***	2002	11	4	7	2022–2025 (4)
4.	(United States) **Caeleb Dressel***	1996	11	3	8	2017–2022 (6)
6.	(United States) Aaron Peirsol	1983	10	3	7	2001–2009 (9)
7.	(Russia) Alexander Popov	1971	9	4	5	1992–2003 (12)
7.	(Australia) Ian Thorpe	1982	9	3	6	1998–2004 (7)
7.	(Australia) Grant Hackett	1980	9	2	7	1998–2005 (8)
10.	(Hungary) Tamás Darnyi	1967	8	4	4	1986–1992 (7)
10.	(United Kingdom) **Adam Peaty***	1994	8	2	6	2015–2021 (7)
12.	(East Germany) Roland Matthes	1950	7	4	3	1968–1975 (8)
12.	(Japan) Kosuke Kitajima	1982	7	4	3	2003–2008 (6)
12.	(Soviet Union) Vladimir Salnikov	1960	7	3	4	1978–1988 (11)
12.	(West Germany) Michael Gross	1964	7	3	4	1982–1988 (7)
12.	(Brazil) César Cielo	1987	7	1	6	2008–2013 (6)
17.	(Hungary) **Kristóf Milák***	2000	5	2	3	2019–2024 (6)
17.	(South Africa) **Chad le Clos***	1992	5	1	4	2012–2017 (6)
17.	(Italy) **Gregorio Paltrinieri***	1994	5	1	4	2015–2022 (8)
17.	(Romania) **David Popovici***	2004	5	1	4	2022–2025 (4)
17.	(China) **Qin Haiyang***	1999	5	0	5	2023–2025 (3)
22.	(United States) Mark Spitz	1950	4	4	0	1972 (1)
22.	(United States) **Bobby Finke***	1999	4	3	1	2021–2024 (4)
22.	(United States) Matt Biondi	1965	4	2	2	1986–1991 (6)
22.	(Australia) Kieren Perkins	1973	4	2	2	1992–1996 (5)
22.	(United States) Tom Dolan	1975	4	2	2	1994–2000 (7)
22.	(United States) Lenny Krayzelburg	1975	4	2	2	1998–2000 (3)
22.	(United States) Anthony Ervin	1981	4	2	2	2000–2016 (17)
22.	(United States) **Ryan Murphy***	1995	4	2	2	2016–2023 (8)
22.	(Russia) **Evgeny Rylov***	1996	4	2	2	2017–2021 (5)
22.	(United Kingdom) David Wilkie	1954	4	1	3	1973–1976 (4)
22.	(Hungary) Norbert Rózsa	1972	4	1	3	1991–1996 (6)
22.	(Hungary) Dániel Gyurta	1989	4	1	3	2009–2013 (5)
22.	(United States) Brendan Hansen	1981	4	0	4	2001–2007 (7)
22.	(France) Camille Lacourt	1985	4	0	4	2011–2017 (7)
22.	(Japan) **Daiya Seto***	1994	4	0	4	2013–2019 (7)
37.	(United States) Charles Daniels	1885	3	3	0	1904–1908 (5)
37.	(United States) Johnny Weissmuller	1904	3	3	0	1924–1928 (5)
37.	(Australia) Murray Rose	1939	3	3	0	1956–1960 (5)
37.	(United States) Mike Burton	1947	3	3	0	1968–1972 (5)
37.	(Netherlands) Pieter van den Hoogenband	1978	3	3	0	2000–2004 (5)
37.	(Sweden) Gunnar Larsson	1951	3	2	1	1972–1973 (2)
37.	(United States) John Hencken	1954	3	2	1	1972–1976 (5)
37.	(United States) Rick Carey	1963	3	2	1	1982–1984 (3)
37.	(Russia) Denis Pankratov	1974	3	2	1	1994–1996 (3)
37.	(United States) Jim Montgomery	1955	3	1	2	1973–1976 (4)
37.	(Canada) Victor Davis	1964	3	1	2	1982–1986 (5)
37.	(Soviet Union) Igor Polyansky	1967	3	1	2	1986–1988 (3)
37.	(Spain) Martín López-Zubero	1969	3	1	2	1991–1994 (4)
37.	(South Africa) Cameron van der Burgh	1988	3	1	2	2009–2013 (5)
37.	(South Korea) Park Tae-hwan	1989	3	1	2	2007–2011 (5)
37.	(France) **Florent Manaudou***	1990	3	1	2	2012–2015 (4)
37.	(United States) **Chase Kalisz***	1994	3	1	2	2017–2021 (5)
37.	(Australia) **Cameron McEvoy***	1994	3	1	2	2023–2025 (3)
37.	(Italy) **Thomas Ceccon***	2001	3	1	2	2022–2024 (3)
37.	(Republic of Ireland) **Daniel Wiffen***	2001	3	1	2	2024 (1)
37.	(Tunisia) **Ahmed Hafnaoui***	2002	3	1	2	2021–2023 (3)
37.	(Hungary) **Hubert Kós***	2003	3	1	2	2023–2025 (3)
37.	(Hungary) András Hargitay	1956	3	0	3	1973–1975 (3)
37.	(United States) Tim Shaw	1957	3	0	3	1975 (1)
37.	(South Africa) Roland Schoeman	1980	3	0	3	2005–2007 (3)
37.	(France) **Maxime Grousset***	1999	3	0	3	2023–2025 (3)

== See also ==
- List of individual gold medalists in swimming at the Olympics and World Aquatics Championships (women)
- List of gold medalist relay teams in swimming at the Olympics and World Aquatics Championships
- List of Olympic medalists in swimming (men)
- List of World Aquatics Championships medalists in swimming (men)
