= Swimming at the 2005 World Aquatics Championships – Men's 800 metre freestyle =

Men's 800m Freestyle at the 2005 FINA World Aquatics Championships
- Dates: 26 July (prelims); 27 July (final)
- Competitors: 45
- Winning time: 7:38.65 WR

Medalists
| gold medal | Grant Hackett | Australia |
| silver medal | Larsen Jensen | United States |
| bronze medal | Yuri Prilukov | Russia |

The Men's 800m Freestyle at the 11th FINA World Aquatics Championships occurred on the morning of 26 July 2005 (preliminary heats) and in the evening of 27 July 2005 (final heat) in the Olympic pool at Parc Jean-Drapeau in Montreal, Canada. 45 swimmers were entered in the event, of which 44 swam. The top-8 swimmers from the morning heats advanced to the next day's final heat.

== Records ==
| World record | Ian Thorpe (AUS) | 7:39.16 | Fukuoka, Japan | 24 July 2001 |
| Championship record | Ian Thorpe (AUS) | 7:39.16 | Fukuoka, Japan | 24 July 2001 |

The following records were established during the competition:

| Date | Round | Name | Nationality | Time | Record |
|---|---|---|---|---|---|
| 27 July | Final | Grant Hackett | Australia | 7:38.65 | WR |

== Results ==
=== Final ===
| Place | Name | Nationality | Time | Note |
|---|---|---|---|---|
| 1 | Grant Hackett | Australia | 7:38.65 | WR |
| 2 | Larsen Jensen | USA | 7:45.63 | AM |
| 3 | Yuri Prilukov | Russia | 7:46.64 | ER |
| 4 | Przemysław Stańczyk | Poland | 7:50.83 | |
| 5 | Oussama Mellouli | Tunisia | 7:51.03 | |
| 6 | David Davies | Great Britain | 7:51.54 | |
| 7 | Lukasz Drzewinski | Poland | 7:58.62 | |
| 8 | Sébastien Rouault | France | 8:03.52 | |

=== Heats ===
| Rank | Name | Nationality | Time | Note |
|---|---|---|---|---|
| 1 | Grant Hackett | Australia | 7:47.63 | Q |
| 2 | Larsen Jensen | USA | 7:48.89 | Q |
| 3 | Yuri Prilukov | Russia | 7:51.75 | Q |
| 4 | David Davies | Great Britain | 7:51.92 | Q |
| 5 | Sébastien Rouault | France | 7:52.04 | Q |
| 6 | Oussama Mellouli | Tunisia | 7:52.55 | Q |
| 7 | Przemysław Stańczyk | Poland | 7:52.56 | Q |
| 8 | Lukasz Drzewinski | Poland | 7:53.33 | Q |
| 9 | Nicolas Rostoucher | France | 7:54.55 | |
| 10 | Christian Hein | Germany | 7:56.38 | |
| 11 | Sergiy Fesenko | Ukraine | 7:57.11 | |
| 12 | Dragoș Coman | Romania | 7:57.79 | |
| 13 | Sho Uchida | Japan | 7:58.00 | |
| 14 | Igor Chervynskiy | Ukraine | 7:59.09 | |
| 15 | Massimiliano Rosolino | Italy | 7:59.60 | |
| 16 | Mark Randall | South Africa | 7:59.65 | |
| 17 | Marco Rivera | Spain | 7:59.66 | |
| 18 | Troyden Prinsloo | South Africa | 7:59.69 | |
| 19 | Andrew Hurd | Canada | 8:00.06 | |
| 20 | Chris Thompson | USA | 8:04.67 | |
| 21 | Taishi Okude | Japan | 8:05.65 | |
| 22 | Fernando Costa | Portugal | 8:06.98 | |
| 23 | Spyridon Gianniotis | Greece | 8:07.46 | |
| 24 | Park Tae-Hwan | South Korea | 8:08.52 | |
| 25 | Felipe Araujo | Brazil | 8:08.66 | |
| 26 | Kurtis MacGillivary | Australia | 8:09.01 | |
| 27 | Luka Turk | Slovenia | 8:09.23 | |
| 28 | Gard Kvale | Norway | 8:09.32 | |
| 29 | XIN Tong | China | 8:12.91 | |
| 30 | Stef Verachten | Belgium | 8:16.93 | |
| 31 | HAN Kuk-In | South Korea | 8:18.06 | |
| 32 | Mahrez Mebarek | Algeria | 8:20.55 | NR |
| 33 | Evan Marcus | Guatemala | 8:23.13 | |
| 34 | Miguel Mendoza | Philippines | 8:28.73 | |
| 35 | Nawaf Al-Wazzan | Kuwait | 8:29.83 | |
| 36 | Sheng-Chieh Tang | Chinese Taipei | 8:29.91 | |
| 37 | Lionel Lee | Singapore | 8:39.94 | |
| 38 | Irakli Revishvili | Georgia | 8:41.81 | |
| 39 | Marcus Cheah | Singapore | 8:48.71 | |
| 40 | Neil Agius | Malta | 8:53.14 | |
| 41 | Rony Bakale | Congo | 8:54.73 | |
| 42 | Steven Mangroo | Seychelles | 8:55.03 | NR |
| 43 | Omar Núñez | Nicaragua | 8:58.55 | |
| 44 | Hei Meng Lao | Macao | 9:17.94 | |
| -- | Emiliano Brembilla | Italy | DNS | |

== See also ==
- Swimming at the 2003 World Aquatics Championships – Men's 800 metre freestyle
- Swimming at the 2007 World Aquatics Championships – Men's 800 metre freestyle
