= Swimming at the 2007 World Aquatics Championships – Men's 1500 metre freestyle =

Men's 1500 metre freestyle at the 2007 FINA World Championships
- Venue: Rod Laver Arena
- Dates: 31 March 2007 (heats); 1 April 2007 (final)
- Competitors: 50
- Winning time: 14:45.94

Medalists
gold medal	Mateusz Sawrymowicz	Poland
silver medal	Yury Prilukov	Russia
bronze medal	David Davies	Great Britain

The men's 1500 metre freestyle at the 2007 World Aquatics Championships was held on the morning of 31 March (heats) and the evening of 1 April (final) at Rod Laver Arena in Melbourne, Australia. 50 swimmers were entered in the event, of which 47 swam.

The existing records at the start of the event were:

- World record (WR): 14:34.56, Grant Hackett (Australia), 29 July 2001, Fukuoka, Japan
- Championship record (CR): same

== Results ==
=== Final ===
Place	Lane	Swimmer	Nationality	Splits	Time
1st place, gold medalist(s)	3	Mateusz Sawrymowicz	Poland		14:45.94
2nd place, silver medalist(s)	1	Yury Prilukov	Russia		14:47.29
3rd place, bronze medalist(s)	4	David Davies	(United Kingdom) Great Britain		14:51.21
4th	5	Larsen Jensen	(United States) USA		14:52.98
5th	6	Federico Colbertaldo	Italy		14:56.22
6th	8	Craig Stevens	Australia		14:59.11
7th	2	Grant Hackett	Australia		14:59.59
8th	7	Erik Vendt	(United States) USA		15:07.76

=== Heats ===
"Q" marks those swimmers who qualified for finals.

Rank	Heat : Lane	Swimmer	Nationality	Splits	Time	Q
1	7 : 5	David Davies	(United Kingdom) Great Britain		14:53.57	Q
2	6 : 7	Larsen Jensen	(United States) USA		14:56.28	Q
3	6 : 4	Mateusz Sawrymowicz	Poland		14:56.65	Q
4	6 : 6	Federico Colbertaldo	Italy		14:58.26	Q
5	5 : 5	Grant Hackett	Australia		14:59.24	Q
6	5 : 6	Erik Vendt	(United States) USA		14:59.82	Q
7	7 : 4	Yury Prilukov	Russia		15:01.67	Q
8	7 : 3	Craig Stevens	Australia		15:02.16	Q
9	5 : 4	Park Tae-Hwan	(South Korea) Korea		15:03.62	
10	7 : 2	Nikita Lobintsev	Russia		15:06.03	
11	5 : 2	Takeshi Matsuda	Japan		15:06.28	
12	7 : 7	Luka Turk	Slovenia		15:07.59	
13	7 : 1	Sergiy Fesenko	Ukraine		15:08.05	
14	6 : 8	Marcos Rivera Miranda	Spain		15:08.95	
15	6 : 1	Ryan Cochrane	Canada		15:09.88	
16	6 : 3	Thomas Lurz	Germany		15:11.26	
17	4 : 5	Mads Glæsner	Denmark		15:12.10	
18	7 : 6	Zhang Lin	China		15:13.27	
19	4 : 4	Dávid Verrasztó	Hungary		15:14.68	
20	5 : 8	Spyridon Gianniotis	Greece		15:15.85	
21	6 : 2	Dragoş Coman	Romania		15:18.73	
22	4 : 6	Tom Vangeneugen	Belgium		15:22.98	
23	5 : 3	Nicolas Rostoucher	France		15:23.98	
24	6 : 5	Sébastien Rouault	France		15:24.90	
25	7 : 8	Zhang Enjian	China		15:29.71	
26	4 : 2	Ricardo Monasterio	Venezuela		15:30.00	
27	5 : 7	Maciej Hreniak	Poland		15:31.35	
28	3 : 7	Ryan Arabejo	Philippines		15:39.86	
29	4 : 7	Florian Janistyn	Austria		15:43.64	
30	4 : 3	Fernando Costa	Portugal		15:46.73	
31	3 : 4	Jarrod Ballem	Canada		15:47.64	
32	4 : 1	Caglar Gokbulut	Turkey		15:48.67	
33	2 : 4	Banjamin Guzman Blanco	Chile		16:05.25	
33	3 : 3	Tharnawat Thanakornworakiart	Thailand		16:05.25	
35	3 : 1	Emanuel Nicolini	San Marino		16:20.46	
36	2 : 5	Pál Joensen	Faroe Islands		16:23.56	
37	3 : 8	Kevin Soow Choy Yeap	Malaysia		16:27.69	
38	3 : 6	Mihajlo Ristovski	(North Macedonia) Macedonia		16:41.60	
39	4 : 8	Erwin Maldonado	Venezuela		16:47.50	
40	2 : 6	Sobitjon Amilov	Uzbekistan		16:49.05	
41	2 : 7	Neil Agius	Malta		17:05.05	
42	2 : 3	Davor Trnovljakovic	(Bosnia and Herzegovina) Bosnia & Herzegovina		17:11.74	
43	1 : 4	Omar Núñez	Nicaragua		17:23.31	
44	1 : 5	Heimanu Sichan	(French Polynesia) Tahiti		17:32.53	
45	2 : 1	Juan Lagos	Honduras		17:33.31	
46	2 : 2	Timur Kartabaev	Kyrgyzstan		17:55.11	
47	1 : 3	Cooper Graf	Northern Mariana Islands		19:33.41	
	3 : 2	Ahmed Mathlouthi	Tunisia		DNS	
	3 : 5	Mohammed Naeem Masri	Syria		DNS	
	5 : 1	Christian Hein	Germany		DNS	

DNS= Did not swim

== See also ==
- Swimming at the 2005 World Aquatics Championships – Men's 1500 metre freestyle
- Swimming at the 2008 Summer Olympics – Men's 1500 metre freestyle
- Swimming at the 2009 World Aquatics Championships – Men's 1500 metre freestyle
