= Swimming at the 2005 World Aquatics Championships – Men's 1500 metre freestyle =

Men's 1500 metre freestyle at the 2005 FINA World Championships
- Dates: 30 July 2005 (heats); 31 July 2005 (final)
- Competitors: 34
- Winning time: 14 minutes 42.58 seconds

Medalists
gold medal	Grant Hackett	Australia
silver medal	Larsen Jensen	United States
bronze medal	David Davies	Great Britain

The men's 1500 metre freestyle at the 2005 World Aquatics Championships occurred on the morning of 30 July (heats) and in the evening of 31 July (final) in the Olympic pool at Parc Jean-Drapeau in Montreal, Canada. 34 swimmers were entered in the event, of which 33 swam.

The existing records at the start of the event were:

- World record (WR): 14:34.56, Grant Hackett (Australia), July 21, 2001 in Fukuoka, Japan.
- Championship record (CR): same

== Results ==
=== Final ===
Place	Name	Nationality	Time	Note
1	Grant Hackett	Australia	14:42.58	
2	Larsen Jensen	USA	14:47.58	
3	David Davies	Great Britain	14:48.11	
4	Yuri Prilukov	Russia	14:51.62	
5	Mateusz Sawrymowicz	Poland	14:59.38	
6	Zhang Lin	China	15:09.79	
7	Sébastien Rouault	France	15:09.84	
8	Christian Hein	Germany	15:14.91	

=== Heats ===
The top-8 swimmers from the 5 preliminary heats qualified for the event final, the next evening. These eight "qualifiers" are denoted by a Q.

Rank	Name	Nationality	Time	Note
1	David Davies	Great Britain	14:59.33	Q
2	Grant Hackett	Australia	15:00.18	Q
3	Yuri Prilukov	Russia	15:01.03	Q
4	Mateusz Sawrymowicz	Poland	15:03.56	Q
5	Larsen Jensen	USA	15:07.58	Q
6	Sébastien Rouault	France	15:08.00	Q
7	Christian Hein	Germany	15:12.12	Q
8	Zhang Lin	China	15:12.62	Q
9	Takeshi Matsuda	Japan	15:13.39	
10	Sergiy Fesenko	Ukraine	15:14.67	
11	Troyden Prinsloo	South Africa	15:16.60	
12	Marco Rivera	Spain	15:19.42	
13	Dragoș Coman	Romania	15:22.21	
14	Fernando Costa	Portugal	15:27.70	
15	Igor Chervynskiy	Ukraine	15:28.49	
16	Kurtis MacGillivary	Australia	15:28.80	
17	Luka Turk	Slovenia	15:30.46	
18	Spyridon Gianniotis	Greece	15:30.97	
19	Massimiliano Rosolino	Italy	15:39.18	
20	Chris Thompson	USA	15:41.66	
21	Paul Biedermann	Germany	15:41.88	
22	HAN Kuk-In	South Korea	15:47.68	
23	Evan Marcus	Guatemala	15:56.20	
24	Gard Kvale	Norway	15:57.38	
25	YU Cheng	China	16:00.97	
26	Nawaf Al-Wazzan	Kuwait	16:04.18	NR
27	Miguel Mendoza	Philippines	16:06.53	
28	Sheng-Chieh Tang	Chinese Taipei	16:18.10	
29	Irakli Revishvili	Georgia	16:50.60	
30	Zhi Cong Lim	Singapore	16:54.29	
31	Steven Mangroo	Seychelles	16:59.00	NR
32	Marcus Cheah	Singapore	16:59.08	
33	Neil Agius	Malta	16:59.71	
--	Aung Kyaw Moe	Myanmar	DNS	

== See also ==
- Swimming at the 2003 World Aquatics Championships – Men's 1500 metre freestyle
- Swimming at the 2004 Summer Olympics – Men's 1500 metre freestyle
- Swimming at the 2007 World Aquatics Championships – Men's 1500 metre freestyle
