= Swimming at the 2008 Summer Olympics – Men's 1500 metre freestyle =

Men's 1500 metre freestyle at the Games of the XXIX Olympiad
- Venue: Beijing National Aquatics Center
- Date: August 15, 2008 (heats); August 17, 2008 (final)
- Competitors: 37 from 29 nations
- Winning time: 14:40.84 AF

Medalists
1st place, gold medalist(s)		Oussama Mellouli	Tunisia
2nd place, silver medalist(s)		Grant Hackett	Australia
3rd place, bronze medalist(s)		Ryan Cochrane	Canada

The men's 1500 metre freestyle event at the 2008 Olympic Games took place on 15 and 17 August at the Beijing National Aquatics Center in Beijing, China.

The winning margin was 0.69 seconds which as of 2023 remains the only time this event was won by less than one second at the Olympics.

Competing at his third Games, Oussama Mellouli made an Olympic milestone to become Tunisia's first ever gold medalist in 48 years. He denied Australia's Grant Hackett a third straight title in the event, touching the wall first in an African record of 14:40.84. Hanging with the leaders through the first two-thirds of the race, Mellouli moved into the lead at the 1,100-metre mark, and held off Hackett's sprinted finish on the final lap. This was also a retribution for Mellouli, who served an 18-month doping ban from FINA for using the banned stimulant Adderall.

Trying to become the first male swimmer to win three gold medals in the same event, Hackett collected a silver in 14:41.53. Meanwhile, Canada's Ryan Cochrane powered home with a bronze in 14:42.69, finishing ahead of Russia's Yuri Prilukov (14:43.21). U.S. swimmer Larsen Jensen, silver medalist in Athens four years earlier, placed fifth with a time 14:48.16, and was followed in the sixth spot by Great Britain's David Davies in 14:52.11. Chinese duo Zhang Lin (14:55.20) and Sun Yang (15:05.12) rounded out the finale.

Earlier in the prelims, Cochrane established a new Olympic record of 14:40.84 in heat three, until Hackett cleared the 14:40 barrier, and lowered the record to 14:38.92 in the final heat of five.

== Records ==
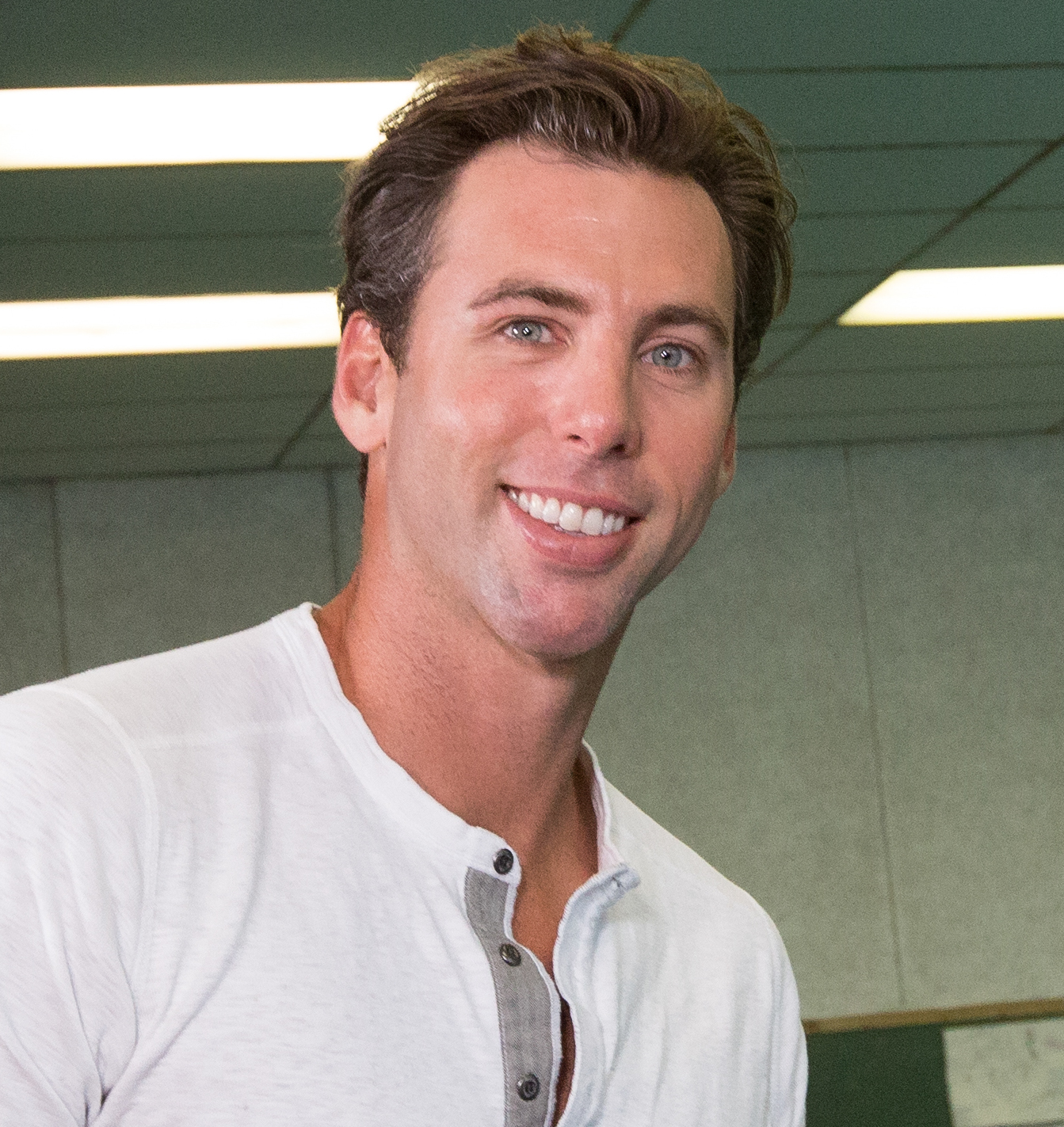
Grant Hackett was the world record holder and aiming to be the first male to complete a hat-trick in swimming events.

Prior to this competition, the existing world and Olympic records were as follows.

World record	Grant Hackett (AUS)	14:34.56	Fukuoka, Japan	29 July 2001	
Olympic record	Grant Hackett (AUS)	14:43.40	Athens, Greece	21 August 2004	-

The following new Olympic records were set during this competition.

Date	Event	Name	Nationality	Time	Record
August 15	Heat 3	Ryan Cochrane	Canada	14:40.84	OR
August 15	Heat 5	Grant Hackett	Australia	14:38.92	OR

== Results ==
=== Heats ===
Rank	Heat	Lane	Name	Nationality	Time	Notes
1	5	5	Grant Hackett	Australia	14:38.92	Q, OR
2	3	5	Ryan Cochrane	Canada	14:40.84	Q, AM
3	3	4	Yuri Prilukov	Russia	14:41.13	Q, EU
4	5	6	Zhang Lin	China	14:45.84	Q, AS
5	3	3	David Davies	Great Britain	14:46.11	Q
6	4	6	Oussama Mellouli	Tunisia	14:47.76	Q
7	4	2	Sun Yang	China	14:48.39	Q
8	5	3	Larsen Jensen	United States	14:49.53	Q
9	4	4	Mateusz Sawrymowicz	Poland	14:50.30	
10	4	5	Federico Colbertaldo	Italy	14:51.44	
11	5	4	Peter Vanderkaay	United States	14:52.11	
12	5	1	Spyridon Gianniotis	Greece	14:53.32	NR
13	2	3	Nicolas Rostoucher	France	15:00.58	
14	2	5	Mads Glæsner	Denmark	15:03.33	
15	4	3	Craig Stevens	Australia	15:04.82	
16	3	6	Park Tae-Hwan	South Korea	15:05.55	
17	4	7	Samuel Pizzetti	Italy	15:07.02	
18	3	7	Takeshi Matsuda	Japan	15:09.17	
19	5	8	Gergő Kis	Hungary	15:09.67	
20	2	2	Tom Vangeneugden	Belgium	15:11.04	NR
21	1	5	Florian Janistyn	Austria	15:12.46	NR
22	5	7	Troyden Prinsloo	South Africa	15:12.64	
23	3	1	Sergey Fesenko	Ukraine	15:13.03	
24	2	4	Maciej Hreniak	Poland	15:16.16	
25	3	8	Richard Charlesworth	Great Britain	15:17.27	
26	4	8	Marcos Rivera	Spain	15:18.98	
27	3	2	Sébastien Rouault	France	15:21.14	
28	2	1	Dragoș Coman	Romania	15:24.05	
29	2	7	Fernando Costa	Portugal	15:26.21	
30	1	3	Petar Stoychev	Bulgaria	15:28.84	
31	5	2	Nikita Lobintsev	Russia	15:35.47	
32	1	6	Ryan Arabejo	Philippines	15:42.77	
33	2	8	Ricardo Monasterio	Venezuela	15:45.98	
34	1	4	Juan Martín Pereyra	Argentina	15:49.57	
35	1	2	Ediz Yildirimer	Turkey	16:28.79	
	2	6	Christian Kubusch	Germany	DNS	
	4	1	Luka Turk	Slovenia	DNS	

=== Final ===
Rank	Lane	Name	Nationality	Time	Notes
1st place, gold medalist(s)	7	Oussama Mellouli	Tunisia	14:40.84	AF
2nd place, silver medalist(s)	4	Grant Hackett	Australia	14:41.53	
3rd place, bronze medalist(s)	5	Ryan Cochrane	Canada	14:42.69	
4	3	Yuri Prilukov	Russia	14:43.21	
5	8	Larsen Jensen	United States	14:48.16	
6	2	David Davies	Great Britain	14:52.11	
7	6	Zhang Lin	China	14:55.20	
8	1	Sun Yang	China	15:05.12	
