= Swimming at the 2007 World Aquatics Championships – Men's 400 metre freestyle =

Men's 400 metre freestyle at the 2007 FINA World Championships
- Venue: Rod Laver Arena
- Date: 25 March 2007
- Competitors: 79
- Winning time: 3 minutes 44.30 seconds

Medalists
gold medal	Park Tae-Hwan	South Korea
silver medal	Grant Hackett	Australia
bronze medal	Yury Prilukov	Russia

The men's 400 metre freestyle at the 2007 World Aquatics Championships took place on 25 March (preliminaries and finals) at Rod Laver Arena in Melbourne, Australia.

On 11 September 2007, the Court of Arbitration for Sport, as part of a retroactive 18-month suspension for an earlier doping infraction, nullified Tunisia's Oussama Mellouli's results from these championships, which affected this event and the men's 800 metre freestyle in particular.

== Records ==
Prior to the competition, the existing world and championship records were as follows.

	Name	Nation	Time	Location	Date
World record	Ian Thorpe	Australia	3:40.08	Manchester	July 30, 2002
Championship record	Ian Thorpe	Australia	3:40.17	Fukuoka	July 22, 2001

No new world or competition records were set during this competition.

== Results ==
=== Final ===
Place	Lane	Name	Nationality	50m	100m	150m	200m	250m	300m	350m	Time	Notes
	5	Park Tae-Hwan	South Korea	26.19	55.00	1:23.83	1:52.87	2:21.49	2:50.39	3:18.24	3:44.30	
	8	Grant Hackett	Australia	26.18	54.80	1:23.27	1:52.14	2:20.63	2:49.44	3:17.81	3:45.43	
	3	Yury Prilukov	Russia	26.52	55.35	1:24.16	1:52.86	2:21.41	2:49.94	3:17.78	3:45.47	
4	4	Peter Vanderkaay	USA	26.01	54.76	1:23.28	1:52.51	2:21.21	2:50.28	3:18.83	3:46.36	
5	7	Federico Colbertaldo	Italy	26.76	55.42	1:24.29	1:53.48	2:22.28	2:51.36	3:19.91	3:48.01	
6	2	Craig Stevens	Australia	27.04	55.87	1:24.73	1:53.89	2:22.99	2:51.98	3:20.53	3:48.26	
7	1	Sergiy Fesenko	Ukraine	27.17	55.92	1:24.95	1:54.01	2:23.29	2:52.25	3:20.99	3:48.49	
DSQ	6	Oussama Mellouli	Tunisia	~~26.13~~	~~54.87~~	~~1:23.45~~	~~1:52.46~~	~~2:20.80~~	~~2:49.23~~	~~3:17.47~~	~~3:45.12~~	DSQ

=== Heats ===
Rank	Heat : Lane	Name	Nationality	100m	200m	300m	Time	Q
1	8 : 5	Peter Vanderkaay	USA	54.25	1:52.26	2:49.69	3:45.82	Q
2	9 : 4	Park Tae-Hwan	South Korea	55.51	1:53.45	2:50.80	3:46.24	Q
3	8 : 4	Yury Prilukov	Russia	55.80	1:53.70	2:51.00	3:46.57	Q
4	9 : 7	Oussama Mellouli	Tunisia	~~54.96~~	~~1:52.21~~	~~2:49.84~~	~~3:46.82~~	~~Q~~
5	9 : 5	Craig Stevens	Australia	55.94	1:53.73	2:51.41	3:46.96	Q
6	8 : 6	Federico Colbertaldo	Italy	54.90	1:52.40	2:50.23	3:48.13	Q
7	10 : 1	Sergiy Fesenko	Ukraine	55.28	1:53.33	2:51.45	3:48.50	Q
8	10 : 5	Grant Hackett	Australia	55.72	1:53.80	2:52.08	3:48.72	Q
9	10 : 6	Przemysław Stańczyk	Poland	55.64	1:53.80	2:51.69	3:48.81	
10	10 : 4	Klete Keller	USA	56.06	1:54.94	2:53.25	3:49.03	
11	8 : 3	Zhang Lin	China	54.53	1:52.75	2:51.12	3:49.08	
12	10 : 3	Massimiliano Rosolino	Italy	54.99	1:53.26	2:51.76	3:49.10	
13	10 : 7	Takeshi Matsuda	Japan	55.39	1:53.63	2:51.61	3:49.26	
14	10 : 2	Sébastien Rouault	France	55.26	1:52.88	2:51.03	3:49.46	
15	8 : 1	Robert Renwick	Great Britain	55.38	1:53.22	2:51.63	3:50.07	
16	10 : 8	Dominik Koll	Austria	55.61	1:54.26	2:52.76	3:50.40	
17	8 : 2	Dragoş Coman	Romania	54.85	1:52.57	2:51.06	3:50.53	
18	9 : 3	Nicolas Rostoucher	France	55.83	1:54.07	2:52.52	3:50.65	
19	7 : 6	Ryan Cochrane	Canada	56.27	1:54.87	2:54.16	3:50.68	
20	7 : 4	Luka Turk	Slovenia	55.90	1:54.46	2:53.14	3:50.72	
21	9 : 6	Mateusz Sawrymowicz	Poland	56.38	1:54.69	2:53.06	3:50.82	
22	9 : 2	Andrew Hurd	Canada	56.16	1:55.01	2:53.77	3:51.52	
23	9 : 1	David Brandl	Austria	56.31	1:55.19	2:53.95	3:51.58	
24	8 : 7	Alexander Selin	Russia	55.52	1:53.47	2:52.40	3:52.32	
25	7 : 7	Dávid Verrasztó	Hungary	56.73	1:55.09	2:54.21	3:52.88	
26	7 : 8	Mads Glæsner	Denmark	56.99	1:56.57	2:55.35	3:52.98	
27	9 : 8	Marcos Rivera Miranda	Spain	55.28	1:54.58	2:54.51	3:53.89	
28	6 : 8	Yuji Sakurai	Japan	55.56	1:55.66	2:56.10	3:54.52	
29	6 : 2	Ahmed Mathlouthi	Tunisia	55.89	1:56.50	2:55.99	3:54.70	
30	7 : 3	Květoslav Svoboda	Czech Republic	55.37	1:54.44	2:53.60	3:54.76	
31	7 : 5	Armando Negreiros	Brazil	56.55	1:55.78	2:56.44	3:55.77	
32	8 : 8	Sun Yang	China	56.37	1:55.87	2:57.38	3:56.11	
33	5 : 8	Fabio Pereira	Portugal	56.73	1:56.83	2:57.12	3:56.46	
34	6 : 6	Robert Voss	New Zealand	56.27	1:56.39	2:57.03	3:57.55	
35	7 : 1	Ricardo Monasterio	Venezuela	57.21	1:57.75	2:58.36	3:57.71	
36	5 : 4	Gard Kvale	Norway	56.88	1:57.48	2:58.43	3:57.98	
37	6 : 3	Shai Liwnat	Israel	55.82	1:56.42	2:57.48	3:58.53	
38	7 : 2	Felipe Araujo	Brazil	56.78	1:56.91	2:57.70	3:59.15	
39	6 : 5	Adriano Niz	Portugal	56.83	1:57.53	2:59.31	3:59.27	
40	4 : 5	Ryan Arabejo	Philippines	58.77	1:59.64	2:59.93	3:59.88	
41	6 : 4	Daniel Bego	Malaysia	58.21	1:59.66	3:00.69	3:59.93	
42	6 : 1	Michael Jack	New Zealand	56.19	1:57.02	2:58.73	3:59.94	
43	5 : 3	Giancarlo Zolezzi Seoane	Chile	57.26	1:58.41	2:59.98	4:01.03	
44	5 : 6	Tharnawat Thanakornworakiart	Thailand	58.95	2:00.24	3:02.14	4:02.99	
45	5 : 5	Caglar Gokbulut	Turkey	59.65	2:01.20	3:02.91	4:04.54	
45	5 : 7	Salvador Mallat Arcaya	Chile	58.06	1:59.96	3:02.98	4:04.54	
47	5 : 1	Oscar Jahnsen	Peru	57.55	1:59.61	3:02.88	4:05.00	
48	4 : 4	Irakli Revishvili	Georgia	59.35	2:01.10	3:03.77	4:05.14	
49	4 : 3	Rehan Poncha	India	59.27	2:01.56	3:04.11	4:05.21	
50	4 : 8	Emanuele Nicolini	San Marino	1:00.47	2:02.63	3:03.84	4:05.35	
51	4 : 1	Mario Montoya	Costa Rica	58.07	2:01.46	3:05.58	4:07.75	
52	3 : 3	Pál Joensen	Faroe Islands	59.37	2:02.79	3:06.75	4:08.40	
53	3 : 6	Zhi Cong Lim	Singapore	1:00.22	2:03.68	3:06.87	4:09.10	
54	5 : 2	Micky van der Vaart	Aruba	58.46	2:00.74	3:04.88	4:09.33	
55	4 : 2	Sebastian Jahnsen	Peru	58.01	2:00.56	3:05.03	4:09.34	
56	3 : 5	Ibrahim Nazarov	Uzbekistan	1:00.29	2:04.42	3:08.80	4:11.36	
57	3 : 4	Timur Irgashev	Uzbekistan	59.70	2:04.00	3:09.46	4:12.24	
58	4 : 6	Kevin Soow Choy Yeap	Malaysia	58.60	2:01.77	3:06.96	4:12.35	
59	2 : 2	Wen Hao Joshua Lim	Singapore	1:02.39	2:09.52	3:15.59	4:17.12	
60	3 : 1	Neil Agius	Malta	1:01.32	2:06.98	3:12.86	4:17.39	
61	2 : 4	Omar Núñez	Nicaragua	1:00.58	2:05.57	3:12.02	4:18.37	
62	2 : 3	Juan Francisco Lagos Diaz	Honduras	1:01.68	2:07.95	3:14.44	4:19.16	
63	3 : 2	Davor Trnovljakovic	Bosnia and Herzegovina	1:00.62	2:06.20	3:13.09	4:19.42	
64	3 : 8	Colin Bensadon	Gibraltar	1:00.14	2:06.09	3:13.19	4:19.86	
65	4 : 7	Anas Abuyousuf	Qatar	1:00.52	2:05.20	3:12.44	4:20.48	
66	2 : 1	Heimanu Sichan	Tahiti	1:01.02	2:07.94	3:16.16	4:23.04	
67	2 : 8	Gael Adam	Mauritius	1:01.29	2:08.89	3:17.36	4:24.08	
68	2 : 7	Oliver Quick	Gibraltar	1:02.70	2:11.51	3:19.90	4:24.78	
69	3 : 7	Rashid Iunusov	Kyrgyzstan	1:00.29	2:07.11	3:17.73	4:27.83	
70	2 : 5	Timur Kartabaev	Kyrgyzstan	1:02.12	2:10.88	3:22.07	4:32.84	
71	1 : 3	Eli Ebenezer Wong	Northern Mariana Islands	1:05.10	2:16.70	3:28.83	4:36.90	
72	2 : 6	Eros Qama	Albania	1:03.49	2:15.55	3:28.40	4:43.97	
73	1 : 6	Cooper Theodore Graf	Northern Mariana Islands	1:09.20	2:25.37	3:42.19	4:57.26	
74	1 : 1	Seraj Mouloud	Libya	1:02.41	2:19.23	3:42.12	5:04.67	
75	1 : 2	Ibrahim Shameel	Maldives	1:11.49	2:36.98	4:04.77	5:31.83	
76	1 : 7	Bernard Blewudzi	Ghana	1:16.76	2:54.64	4:39.70	6:23.27	
	1 : 4	Samson Opuakpo	Nigeria				DNS	
	1 : 5	Nemune Tebesa	Nigeria				DNS	
	6 : 7	Mohammed Naeem Masri	Syria				DNS	

== See also ==
- Swimming at the 2005 World Aquatics Championships – Men's 400 metre freestyle
- Swimming at the 2008 Summer Olympics – Men's 400 metre freestyle
- Swimming at the 2009 World Aquatics Championships – Men's 400 metre freestyle
