= Swimming at the 2005 World Aquatics Championships – Men's 400 metre freestyle =

Men's 400 metre freestyle at the 2005 FINA World Championships
- Date: 24 July 2005
- Competitors: 57
- Winning time: 3:42.91

Medalists
gold medal	Grant Hackett	Australia
silver medal	Yuri Prilukov	Russia
bronze medal	Oussama Mellouli	Tunisia

The men's 400 metre freestyle at the 2005 World Aquatics Championships took place on 24 July (heats and final) in the Olympic pool at Parc Jean-Drapeau in Montreal, Canada. 57 swimmers were entered and in the event in the preliminary heats, the top-8 of which advanced on to swim again in the final heat that event.

The existing records at the start of the event were:

- World record (WR): 3:40.08, Ian Thorpe (Australia), 30 July 2002 in Manchester, UK.
- Championship record (CR): 3:40.17, Ian Thorpe (Australia), Fukuoka 2001 (22 July 2001)

== Results ==
=== Final ===
Place	Name	Nationality	Time	Note
1	Grant Hackett	Australia	3:42.91	
2	Yuri Prilukov	Russia	3:44.44	
3	Oussama Mellouli	Tunisia	3:46.08	
4	Massimiliano Rosolino	Italy	3:46.91	
5	Dragoș Coman	Romania	3:47.16	
6	Peter Vanderkaay	USA	3:47.83	
7	Takeshi Matsuda	Japan	3:48.60	
8	Nicolas Rostoucher	France	3:50.51	

=== Prelims ===
Rank	Name	Nationality	Time	Note
1	Grant Hackett	Australia	3:44.63	Q
2	Dragoș Coman	Romania	3:46.70	Q, NR
3	Takeshi Matsuda	Japan	3:47.28	Q
4	Yuri Prilukov	Russia	3:47.48	Q
5	Peter Vanderkaay	USA	3:47.59	Q
6	Oussama Mellouli	Tunisia	3:48.89	Q
7	Massimiliano Rosolino	Italy	3:48.93	Q
8	Nicolas Rostoucher	France	3:49.00	Q
9	Emiliano Brembilla	Italy	3:49.34	
10	Nicholas Sprenger	Australia	3:49.55	
11	Przemysław Stańczyk	Poland	3:49.72	
12	Dimitrios Manganas	Greece	3:49.99	
13	Sergiy Fesenko	Ukraine	3:50.15	
14	Sho Uchida	Japan	3:50.17	
15	Christian Hein	Germany	3:50.24	
16	Sébastien Rouault	France	3:50.33	
17	Andrew Herd	Canada	3:50.47	
18	Michael Phelps	USA	3:50.53	
19	ZHANG Lin	China	3:51.88	
20	Paul Biedermann	Germany	3:52.45	
21	David Carry	Great Britain	3:52.88	
22	Colin Russell	Canada	3:52.92	
23	Spyridon Gianniotis	Greece	3:53.19	
24	Felipe Araujo	Brazil	3:54.57	
25	Igor Snitko	Ukraine	3:55.35	
26	Paweł Korzeniowski	Poland	3:55.43	
27	Květoslav Svoboda	Czech Republic	3:55.62	
28	Luka Turk	Slovenia	3:56.26	
29	Dominik Koll	Austria	3:56.58	
30	Gard Kvale	Norway	3:57.66	
31	Stef Verachten	Belgium	3:58.20	
32	Xin Tong	China	3:58.31	
33	Moss Burmester	New Zealand	3:58.35	
34	Giancarlo Zolezzi	Chile	3:58.74	
35	Shai Livnat	Israel	3:59.48	
36	Mahrez Mebarek	Algeria	3:59.84	
37	HAN Kuk-In	South Korea	4:01.01	
38	Miguel Mendoza	Philippines	4:02.82	
39	Evan Marcus	Guatemala	4:03.50	
40	Muhammad Akbar Nasution	Indonesia	4:03.92	
41	Sebastian Arango Herrera	Colombia	4:04.47	
42	PARK Tae-Hawn	South Korea	4:04.76	
43	Sheng-Chieh Tang	Chinese Taipei	4:06.72	
44	Salvador Mallat	Chile	4:06.90	
45	Lionel Lee	Singapore	4:07.04	
46	Nawaf Al-Wazzan	Kuwait	4:07.64	
47	Timur Irgashev	Uzbekistan	4:08.58	
48	Ibrahim Nazarov	Uzbekistan	4:10.75	
49	Irakli Revishvili	Georgia	4:12.18	
50	Kuo-Chuan Tsai	Chinese Taipei	4:12.58	
51	Marcus Cheah	Singapore	4:13.93	
52	Neil Agius	Malta	4:16.44	
53	Omar Núñez	Nicaragua	4:20.27	
54	Steven Mangroo	Seychelles	4:20.47	
55	Antonio Tong	Macao	4:21.43	
56	Loai Tashkandi	Saudi Arabia	4:26.07	
57	Aung Kyaw Moe	Myanmar	4:46.71	

== See also ==
- Swimming at the 2003 World Aquatics Championships – Men's 400 metre freestyle
- Swimming at the 2004 Summer Olympics – Men's 400 metre freestyle
- Swimming at the 2007 World Aquatics Championships – Men's 400 metre freestyle
