= Swimming at the 2007 World Aquatics Championships – Men's 800 metre freestyle =

Men's 800 metre freestyle at the 2007 FINA World Championships
- Venue: Rod Laver Arena
- Dates: 27 March 2007 (heats); 28 March 2007 (final)
- Competitors: 46
- Winning time: 7 minutes 47.91 seconds

Medalists
gold medal	Przemysław Stańczyk	Poland
silver medal	Craig Stevens	Australia
bronze medal	Federico Colbertaldo	Italy

The men's 800 metre freestyle was the 17th event of the swimming program at the 2007 World Aquatics Championships held in Rod Laver Arena in Melbourne, Australia. The event was swum on the morning of 27 March (heats) and in the evening of 28 March. 46 swimmers were entered in the event, of which 43 swam in one of 6 preliminary heats. The top-8 finishers from the prelims qualified ("Q") to swim in the final the next evening.

The existing records at the start of the event were:

- World record (WR): 7:38.65, Grant Hackett (Australia), 27 July 2005 in Montreal, Canada.
- Championship record (CR): same

On 11 September 2007, the Court of Arbitration for Sport stripped Oussama Mellouli of Tunisia of his gold medal and nullified his result as part of a retroactive 18-month suspension for an earlier doping violation.

== Results ==
=== Final ===
Place	Lane	Swimmer	Nationality	100m	200m	300m	400m	500m	600m	700m	Time	Note
	7	Przemysław Stańczyk	Poland	57.31	1:57.10	2:56.02	3:55.36	4:54.21	5:52.59	6:50.91	7:47.91	
	4	Craig Stevens	Australia	57.35	1:56.34	2:55.90	3:55.72	4:55.08	5:54.45	6:52.69	7:48.67	
	5	Federico Colbertaldo	Italy	57.66	1:56.77	2:56.04	3:55.37	4:54.48	5:53.53	6:52.58	7:49.98	
4th	8	Sébastien Rouault	France	55.67	1:54.40	2:53.46	3:52.93	4:52.85	5:53.03	6:53.34	7:52.04	
5th	1	Sergiy Fesenko	Ukraine	57.34	1:57.26	2:57.10	3:57.12	4:57.03	5:56.31	6:55.07	7:53.43	
6th	2	Grant Hackett	Australia	57.34	1:57.21	2:56.95	3:57.00	4:56.96	5:57.10	6:57.44	7:55.39	
7th	6	Ryan Cochrane	Canada	57.84	1:57.26	2:56.64	3:56.34	4:56.15	5:56.99	6:57.69	7:56.56	
DSQ	3	Oussama Mellouli	Tunisia	~~57.31~~	~~1:56.44~~	~~2:55.94~~	~~3:55.49~~	~~4:54.19~~	~~5:52.92~~	~~6:50.80~~	~~7:46.95~~	

=== Heats ===
Rank	Heat : Lane	Name	Nationality	200m	400m	600m	Time	Note
1	5 : 4	Craig Stevens	Australia	1:56.32	3:54.72	5:54.41	7:50.72	Q
2	4 : 5	Federico Colbertaldo	Italy	1:56.76	3:55.28	5:53.63	7:50.77	Q
3	6 : 3	Oussama Mellouli	Tunisia	1:56.26	3:55.73	5:55.48	~~7:51.48~~	Q
4	6 : 2	Ryan Cochrane	Canada	1:57.40	3:56.87	5:56.18	7:51.55	Q
5	6 : 4	Grant Hackett	Australia	1:56.76	3:56.64	5:56.87	7:51.86	Q
6	5 : 5	Przemysław Stańczyk	Poland	1:56.17	3:54.88	5:54.65	7:52.40	Q
7	4 : 7	Sergiy Fesenko	Ukraine	1:57.56	3:56.92	5:55.94	7:52.64	Q
8	4 : 3	Sébastien Rouault	France	1:57.27	3:56.42	5:55.51	7:52.92	Q
9	5 : 6	Peter Vanderkaay	USA	1:56.49	3:55.99	5:55.49	7:54.37	
10	5 : 2	Erik Vendt	USA	1:55.43	3:54.73	5:55.09	7:54.48	
11	5 : 1	Luka Turk	Slovenia	1:56.21	3:55.84	5:56.84	7:54.58	
12	6 : 6	Nikita Lobintsev	Russia	1:56.01	3:56.03	5:57.57	7:56.91	
13	4 : 6	Marcos Rivera Miranda	Spain	1:58.56	3:59.40	5:59.62	7:57.14	
14	6 : 7	Mads Glæsner	Denmark	1:56.53	3:57.38	5:59.35	7:59.43	
15	4 : 1	Dragoş Coman	Romania	1:57.07	3:56.73	5:57.61	7:59.91	
16	4 : 2	Vitaly Romanovich	Russia	1:57.42	3:59.62	6:01.58	7:59.94	
17	4 : 4	Christian Hein	Germany	1:58.46	3:59.88	6:01.60	8:00.14	
18	6 : 5	Nicolas Rostoucher	France	1:56.88	3:56.50	5:58.29	8:03.03	
19	5 : 7	Maciej Hreniak	Poland	1:58.53	4:00.37	6:03.56	8:05.01	
20	5 : 8	David Brandl	Austria	1:58.78	4:00.54	6:03.31	8:05.48	
21	3 : 4	Ricardo Monasterio	Venezuela	1:59.84	4:02.69	6:06.39	8:05.81	
22	3 : 3	Fernando Costa	Portugal	1:59.74	4:02.83	6:06.31	8:06.44	
23	1 : 7	Sun Yang	China	2:01.36	4:05.14	6:09.07	8:08.12	
24	3 : 7	Ahmed Mathlouthi	Tunisia	2:00.88	4:02.90	6:06.89	8:09.59	
25	6 : 1	Felipe Araújo	Brazil	1:59.34	4:02.99	6:07.85	8:10.50	
26	6 : 8	Armando Negreiros	Brazil	1:58.09	4:01.80	6:07.77	8:11.01	
27	1 : 2	Ren Chen	China	2:02.16	4:07.12	6:11.22	8:12.32	
28	3 : 2	Robert Voss	New Zealand	1:59.43	4:03.18	6:08.55	8:13.78	
29	3 : 6	Florian Janistyn	Austria	1:59.28	4:02.25	6:08.52	8:14.26	
30	3 : 1	Caglar Gokbulut	Turkey	2:04.25	4:09.33	6:15.23	8:19.08	
31	4 : 8	Shinya Taniguchi	Japan	2:01.44	4:08.06	6:18.16	8:25.83	
32	2 : 3	Benjamin Guzman Blanco	Chile	2:03.37	4:11.60	6:20.56	8:26.24	
33	2 : 5	Mario Montoya	Costa Rica	2:03.46	4:11.70	6:20.45	8:27.47	NR
34	2 : 8	Pál Joensen	Faroe Islands	2:05.00	4:13.52	6:22.43	8:30.31	
35	3 : 8	Irakli Revishvili	Georgia	2:06.43	4:14.72	6:23.95	8:31.52	
36	2 : 4	Kevin Soow Choy Yeap	Malaysia	2:03.59	4:12.79	6:20.46	8:32.35	
37	3 : 5	Erwin Maldonado	Venezuela	2:02.19	4:11.67	6:25.34	8:38.69	
38	2 : 6	Micky van der Vaart	Aruba	2:03.10	4:12.91	6:25.25	8:39.17	
39	1 : 4	Neil Agius	Malta	2:11.17	4:27.57	6:44.13	8:57.63	
40	2 : 7	Davor Trnovljakovic	Bosnia and Herzegovina	2:07.86	4:25.91	6:45.41	9:01.70	
41	1 : 5	Heimanu Sichan	Tahiti	2:11.61	4:29.77	6:50.87	9:09.79	
42	2 : 1	Timur Kartabaev	Kyrgyzstan	2:14.75	4:39.79	7:04.84	9:27.31	
43	1 : 3	Cooper Graf	Northern Mariana Islands	2:31.67	5:08.95	7:45.20	10:14.48	
	1 : 6	Ibraihm Assah	Ghana				DNS	
	2 : 2	Anas Abuyousuf	Qatar				DNS	
	5 : 3	Andrew Hurd	Canada				DNS	

== See also ==
- Swimming at the 2005 World Aquatics Championships – Men's 800 metre freestyle
- Swimming at the 2009 World Aquatics Championships – Men's 800 metre freestyle
