= Swimming at the 2004 Summer Olympics – Men's 400 metre freestyle =

Men's 400 metre freestyle at the Games of the XXVIII Olympiad
- Venue: Athens Olympic Aquatic Centre
- Dates: August 14, 2004 (heats & final)
- Competitors: 47 from 39 nations
- Winning time: 3:43.10

Medalists
1st place, gold medalist(s)		Ian Thorpe	Australia
2nd place, silver medalist(s)		Grant Hackett	Australia
3rd place, bronze medalist(s)		Klete Keller	United States

The men's 400 metre freestyle event at the 2004 Olympic Games was contested at the Olympic Aquatic Centre of the Athens Olympic Sports Complex in Athens, Greece on August 14.

Australia's Ian Thorpe edged out his teammate Grant Hackett to defend his Olympic title in 3:43.10, despite having been disqualified for a false start from the national trials in Sydney. Hackett earned a silver in 3:43.36, just 0.01 of a second under his winning time at the trials without the presence of Thorpe. U.S. swimmer Klete Keller set a new American record of 3:44.11 to take his second Olympic bronze medal in the event. Meanwhile, another American Larsen Jensen finished outside the medals in fourth place, but came home in a lifetime best of 3:46.08, holding off Italy's Massimiliano Rosolino by 0.17 seconds.

== Records ==
Prior to this competition, the existing world and Olympic records were as follows:

World record	Ian Thorpe (AUS)	3:40.08	Manchester, England	30 July 2002
Olympic record	Ian Thorpe (AUS)	3:40.59	Sydney, Australia	16 September 2000

== Pre-Olympic buildup ==
In late March 2004 at the Australian Championships in Sydney, the defending champion Ian Thorpe overbalanced whilst on the blocks in the heats of the 400 m freestyle and fell into the water, resulting in his disqualification and ending the defense of his Olympic 400 m title. This resulted in a large debate among the swimming and public community as to whether Thorpe should be given an exception to Australia's policy of selecting the first and second place getters, with Prime Minister of Australia John Howard describing the situation as a "tragedy". Despite the intense media spotlight, Thorpe managed to win the 100 m and 200 m freestyle events in times of 48.83s and 1 min 45.07s respectively to ensure his selection for Athens. Craig Stevens, who had claimed the second qualifying position in the 400 m event, subsequently faced immense public pressure to relinquish his position to Thorpe, and later did so in a television interview for which he was paid. This generated ethical debate as to whether Stevens' decision had been bought, and criticism against Thorpe.

Thorpe's increasing focus on the 100 m event, coupled with the media pressure, resulted in speculation that he was vulnerable to Hackett in the 400 m event. Thorpe safely qualified for the 400 m final behind Hackett in the heats.

== Results ==
=== Heats ===
Rank	Heat	Lane	Name	Nationality	Time	Notes
1	5	4	Grant Hackett	Australia	3:46.36	Q
2	6	4	Ian Thorpe	Australia	3:46.55	Q
3	6	5	Larsen Jensen	United States	3:46.90	Q
4	4	5	Massimiliano Rosolino	Italy	3:47.72	Q
5	4	4	Klete Keller	United States	3:47.77	Q
6	5	3	Yuri Prilukov	Russia	3:48.71	Q
7	6	6	Spyridon Gianniotis	Greece	3:48.77	Q
8	5	7	Takeshi Matsuda	Japan	3:49.05	Q, AS
9	6	7	Przemysław Stańczyk	Poland	3:49.22	
10	6	8	Christian Hein	Germany	3:49.66	
11	6	3	Emiliano Brembilla	Italy	3:50.55	
12	4	7	Nicolas Rostoucher	France	3:50.73	
13	4	3	Andrew Hurd	Canada	3:50.81	
14	5	1	Łukasz Drzewiński	Poland	3:50.97	
15	5	2	Jacob Carstensen	Denmark	3:51.09	
16	5	5	Dragoş Coman	Romania	3:51.73	
17	5	6	Adam Faulkner	Great Britain	3:51.97	
18	4	1	Heiko Hell	Germany	3:52.06	
19	6	1	Marcos Rivera	Spain	3:52.39	
20	6	2	Graeme Smith	Great Britain	3:52.41	
21	4	8	Sergey Fesenko	Ukraine	3:53.41	
22	5	8	Mark Johnston	Canada	3:54.27	
23	4	6	Ricardo Monasterio	Venezuela	3:54.41	
24	4	2	Dimitrios Manganas	Greece	3:54.78	
25	2	4	Giancarlo Zolezzi	Chile	3:56.52	NR
26	3	4	Zhang Lin	China	3:56.65	
27	3	1	Juan Martín Pereyra	Argentina	3:57.26	
28	2	5	Moss Burmester	New Zealand	3:57.29	
29	3	7	Leonardo Salinas Saldana	Mexico	3:58.36	
30	3	6	Mahrez Mebarek	Algeria	3:59.10	
31	3	3	Bojan Zdešar	Slovenia	3:59.38	
32	2	2	Petar Stoychev	Bulgaria	3:59.86	
33	2	3	Charnvudth Saengsri	Thailand	3:59.89	
34	3	5	Bruno Bonfim	Brazil	3:59.96	
35	2	1	Victor Rogut	Moldova	4:01.68	
36	1	2	Miguel Mendoza	Philippines	4:01.99	
37	2	7	Nenad Buljan	Croatia	4:02.76	
38	3	8	Boldizsár Kiss	Hungary	4:02.87	
39	2	8	Martín Kutscher	Uruguay	4:03.21	
40	1	5	Chen Te-tung	Chinese Taipei	4:03.71	
41	2	6	Aytekin Mindan	Turkey	4:06.85	
42	1	3	Emanuele Nicolini	San Marino	4:08.28	
43	1	7	Anas Abuyousuf	Qatar	4:11.99	
44	1	6	Vasilii Danilov	Kyrgyzstan	4:15.32	
45	1	4	Sergey Tsoy	Uzbekistan	4:16.91	
46	1	1	Neil Agius	Malta	4:22.14	
	3	2	Park Tae-hwan	South Korea	DSQ	

=== Final ===
There was a slow start in the final, with Thorpe reaching the 100 m mark one second outside world record pace with a narrow lead. In a topsy-turvy performance at irregular pace, Thorpe was passed by Klete Keller by the 150 m mark before accelerating again to reclaim the lead by the 200 m mark. Thorpe kept Hackett and Keller at around half a body length up to the 300 m mark, before breaking to a body-length lead by 350 m. However, he could not produce his trademark finishing kick and was closed down by Hackett, holding on by only 0.26 in a time three seconds outside his own world record. Thorpe appeared to shed tears in an uncharacteristic sign of emotion, admitting afterwards that the controversy surrounding the event had taken a toll on him, but denying that any liquid had left his eyes.

Rank	Lane	Name	Nationality	Time	Notes
1st place, gold medalist(s)	5	Ian Thorpe	Australia	3:43.10	
2nd place, silver medalist(s)	4	Grant Hackett	Australia	3:43.36	
3rd place, bronze medalist(s)	2	Klete Keller	United States	3:44.11	AM
4	3	Larsen Jensen	United States	3:46.08	
5	6	Massimiliano Rosolino	Italy	3:46.25	
6	7	Yuri Prilukov	Russia	3:46.69	
7	1	Spyridon Gianniotis	Greece	3:48.77	
8	8	Takeshi Matsuda	Japan	3:48.96	AS
