= Swimming at the 2004 Summer Olympics – Men's 1500 metre freestyle =

Men's 1500m freestyle at the Games of the XXVIII Olympiad
- Venue: Athens Olympic Aquatic Centre
- Dates: August 20, 2004 (heats); August 21, 2004 (final)
- Competitors: 34 from 28 nations
- Winning time: 14:43.40 OR

Medalists
1st place, gold medalist(s)		Grant Hackett	Australia
2nd place, silver medalist(s)		Larsen Jensen	United States
3rd place, bronze medalist(s)		David Davies	Great Britain

The men's 1500 metre freestyle event at the 2004 Olympic Games was contested at the Olympic Aquatic Centre of the Athens Olympic Sports Complex in Athens, Greece on August 20 and 21.

Australian swimmer and world record holder Grant Hackett became the third swimmer in history to defend the title in this event, breaking an Olympic record time of 14:43.40. U.S. swimmer Larsen Jensen set an American record time of 14:45.29 to take the silver. Great Britain's David Davies, on the other hand, fought off a challenge from Russia's Yuri Prilukov in the final lap to earn a bronze medal by a 7-second margin, with a European record of 14:45.95.

== Records ==
Prior to this competition, the existing world and Olympic records were as follows:

World record	Grant Hackett (AUS)	14:34.56	Fukuoka, Japan	29 July 2001
Olympic record	Kieren Perkins (AUS)	14:43.48	Barcelona, Spain	31 July 1992

The following records were established during the competition:

Date	Event	Name	Nationality	Time	Record
21 August	Final	Grant Hackett	Australia	14:43.40	OR

== Results ==
=== Heats ===
Rank	Heat	Lane	Name	Nationality	Time	Notes
1	3	4	David Davies	Great Britain	14:57.03	Q
2	5	5	Yuri Prilukov	Russia	15:01.02	Q
3	5	4	Grant Hackett	Australia	15:01.89	Q
4	4	4	Larsen Jensen	United States	15:03.75	Q
5	5	2	Spyridon Gianniotis	Greece	15:03.87	Q
6	3	7	Dragoș Coman	Romania	15:06.33	Q, NR
7	3	2	Graeme Smith	Great Britain	15:07.45	Q
8	5	3	Craig Stevens	Australia	15:09.54	Q
9	5	7	Paweł Korzeniowski	Poland	15:11.62	
10	4	5	Igor Chervynskiy	Ukraine	15:12.58	
11	4	3	Nicolas Rostoucher	France	15:13.56	
12	5	6	Christian Hein	Germany	15:15.42	
13	3	6	Takeshi Matsuda	Japan	15:16.42	
14	2	4	Oussama Mellouli	Tunisia	15:18.98	
15	5	1	Ricardo Monasterio	Venezuela	15:20.89	
16	3	5	Erik Vendt	United States	15:22.00	
17	2	5	Petar Stoychev	Bulgaria	15:28.32	
18	3	8	Andrew Hurd	Canada	15:28.71	
19	3	3	Alexei Filipets	Russia	15:30.05	
20	4	8	Bojan Zdešar	Slovenia	15:31.57	
21	5	8	Fernando Costa	Portugal	15:32.55	
22	4	2	Thomas Lurz	Germany	15:33.81	
23	4	1	Gergő Kis	Hungary	15:38.06	
24	4	7	Christian Minotti	Italy	15:39.31	
25	3	1	Cho Sung-mo	South Korea	15:43.43	
26	2	6	Juan Martín Pereyra	Argentina	15:53.29	
27	1	5	Charnvudth Saengsri	Thailand	15:54.46	
28	2	2	Moss Burmester	New Zealand	15:56.42	
29	2	3	Nenad Buljan	Croatia	15:56.54	
30	1	4	Giancarlo Zolezzi	Chile	16:00.52	
31	4	6	Georgios Diamantidis	Greece	16:06.31	
32	1	3	Saw Yi Khy	Malaysia	16:06.38	
33	2	7	Xin Tong	China	16:10.43	
34	2	1	Miguel Mendoza	Philippines	16:26.52	

=== Final ===
Rank	Lane	Name	Nationality	Time	Notes
1st place, gold medalist(s)	3	Grant Hackett	Australia	14:43.40	OR
2nd place, silver medalist(s)	6	Larsen Jensen	United States	14:45.29	AM
3rd place, bronze medalist(s)	4	David Davies	Great Britain	14:45.95	ER
4	5	Yuri Prilukov	Russia	14:52.48	NR
5	2	Spyridon Gianniotis	Greece	15:03.69	
6	1	Graeme Smith	Great Britain	15:09.71	
7	7	Dragoș Coman	Romania	15:10.21	
8	8	Craig Stevens	Australia	15:13.66	
