= Swimming at the 2008 Summer Olympics – Men's 400 metre freestyle =

Men's 400 metre freestyle at the Games of the XXIX Olympiad
- Venue: Beijing National Aquatics Center
- Date: August 9, 2008 (heats); August 10, 2008 (final)
- Competitors: 37 from 27 nations
- Winning time: 3:41.86

Medalists
1st place, gold medalist(s)		Park Tae-Hwan	South Korea
2nd place, silver medalist(s)		Zhang Lin	China
3rd place, bronze medalist(s)		Larsen Jensen	United States

The men's 400 metre freestyle event at the 2008 Olympic Games took place on 9–10 August at the Beijing National Aquatics Center in Beijing, China.

Reigning world champion Park Tae-Hwan made an Olympic milestone to become South Korea's first ever gold medalist in swimming. He powered past the field to an unexpected triumph in an Asian record of 3:41.86. Coming from sixth place in the final lap, China's Zhang Lin delighted the home crowd with a silver-medal effort in 3:42.44. Meanwhile, U.S. swimmer Larsen Jensen set a new American record of 3:42.78 to take the bronze.

American Peter Vanderkaay delivered a strong swim with a fourth-place effort in 3:43.11, just 0.35 of a second ahead of Tunisia's Oussama Mellouli, who established a new African record of 3:43.45. Leading the field in the first 100 metres, Australia's Grant Hackett, the silver medalist in the event from Athens, could not keep the pace over the final laps, and settled only for sixth place with a time of 3:43.84. Russian duo Yuri Prilukov (3:43.97) and Nikita Lobintsev (3:48.29) rounded out the final.

== Records ==
Prior to this competition, the existing world and Olympic records were as follows.

World record	Ian Thorpe (AUS)	3:40.08	Manchester, United Kingdom	30 July 2002	
Olympic record	Ian Thorpe (AUS)	3:40.59	Sydney, Australia	16 September 2000	-

== Results ==
=== Heats ===
Rank	Heat	Lane	Name	Nationality	Time	Notes
1	4	4	Larsen Jensen	United States	3:43.10	Q, AM
2	3	5	Zhang Lin	China	3:43.32	Q, AS
3	3	4	Park Tae-Hwan	South Korea	3:43.35	Q
4	4	6	Nikita Lobintsev	Russia	3:43.45	Q, NR
5	5	4	Grant Hackett	Australia	3:44.03	Q
6	5	5	Peter Vanderkaay	United States	3:44.22	Q
7	4	5	Oussama Mellouli	Tunisia	3:44.54	Q
8	5	3	Yuri Prilukov	Russia	3:44.82	Q
9	5	2	Ryan Cochrane	Canada	3:44.85	NR
10	3	2	Takeshi Matsuda	Japan	3:44.99	NR
11	3	3	Federico Colbertaldo	Italy	3:45.28	
12	4	8	Mads Glæsner	Denmark	3:45.38	NR
13	4	3	Massimiliano Rosolino	Italy	3:45.57	
14	3	1	Nicolas Rostoucher	France	3:47.15	
15	5	7	David Carry	Great Britain	3:47.17	NR
16	5	1	Sergey Fesenko	Ukraine	3:47.75	NR
17	5	8	Dragoș Coman	Romania	3:47.79	
18	3	7	Paul Biedermann	Germany	3:48.03	
19	5	6	Przemysław Stańczyk	Poland	3:48.11	
20	2	5	David Brandl	Austria	3:48.63	
21	3	8	Dean Milwain	Great Britain	3:48.77	
22	4	7	Paweł Korzeniowski	Poland	3:48.78	
23	2	4	Sébastien Rouault	France	3:48.84	
24	2	3	Spyridon Gianniotis	Greece	3:49.34	
25	3	6	Craig Stevens	Australia	3:50.22	
26	1	5	Gard Kvale	Norway	3:50.47	NR
27	2	7	Dominik Meichtry	Switzerland	3:50.55	
28	4	2	Sun Yang	China	3:50.90	
29	4	1	Christian Kubusch	Germany	3:52.73	
30	2	6	Jean Basson	South Africa	3:52.90	
31	1	4	Daniele Tirabassi	Venezuela	3:53.26	
32	2	8	Balázs Gercsák	Hungary	3:54.14	
33	1	3	Květoslav Svoboda	Czech Republic	3:56.54	
34	2	2	Jon Raahauge Rud	Denmark	3:57.41	
35	1	6	Juan Martín Pereyra	Argentina	3:59.35	
36	1	2	Oleg Rabota	Kazakhstan	4:02.16	
	2	1	Luka Turk	Slovenia	DNS	

=== Final ===
Rank	Lane	Name	Nationality	Time	Notes
1st place, gold medalist(s)	3	Park Tae-Hwan	South Korea	3:41.86	AS
2nd place, silver medalist(s)	5	Zhang Lin	China	3:42.44	NR
3rd place, bronze medalist(s)	4	Larsen Jensen	United States	3:42.78	AM
4	7	Peter Vanderkaay	United States	3:43.11	
5	1	Oussama Mellouli	Tunisia	3:43.45	AF
6	2	Grant Hackett	Australia	3:43.84	
7	8	Yuri Prilukov	Russia	3:43.97	
8	6	Nikita Lobintsev	Russia	3:48.29	
