= Georgios Diamantidis =

Greek swimmer (born 1984)

Personal information
- Full name: Georgios Diamantidis
- Nickname: Giorgos
- National team: Greece
- Born: 3 January 1984 (age 42) Katerini, Central Macedonia, Greece
- Height: 1.83 m (6 ft 0 in)
- Weight: 70 kg (154 lb)

Sport
- Sport: Swimming
- Strokes: Freestyle
- Club: Olympiacos F.C.
- College team: Hellenic College of Thessaloniki
- Coach: Vojko Race

Georgios Diamantidis (Greek: Γεώργιος Διαμαντίδης; born 3 January 1984) is a Greek former swimmer, who specialized in long-distance freestyle events. Diamantidis qualified for the men's 1500 m freestyle at the 2004 Summer Olympics in Athens, by clearing a FINA A-standard entry time of 15:09.25 from the Greece National Open in Thessaloniki. He challenged seven other swimmers on the fourth heat, including top medal favorite Larsen Jensen of the United States. He rounded out the field to last place by a 27-second margin behind Italy's Christian Minotti in 16:06.31. Diamantidis failed to advance into the final, as he placed thirty-first overall in the preliminaries.

== Career ==
- Olympic Games
  - 2004 Greece, Athens 1500m freestyle
- World Championship
  - 2003 Barcelona 1500m freestyle
- World Cups
  - 2001 Imperia, Italy 400m-1500m freestyle
  - 2002 Paris, France 400m-1500m freestyle
  - 2003 Spain, Barcelona 400m-1500m freestyle
- European Championships
  - 2002 Austria, Linz 400m-1500m (A) freestyle
  - 2004 Spain, Madrid 1500m (M) freestyle
  - 2006 Hungary, Budapest 1500m (M) freestyle
