= Sergey Tsoy (swimmer) =

Uzbekistani swimmer (born 1986)

Personal information
- Full name: Sergey Tsoy
- National team: Uzbekistan
- Born: 7 January 1986 (age 40) Tashkent, Uzbek SSR, Soviet Union
- Height: 1.78 m (5 ft 10 in)
- Weight: 72 kg (159 lb)

Sport
- Sport: Swimming
- Strokes: Freestyle

Sergey Tsoy (Uzbek: Сергей Цой; born January 7, 1986) is an Uzbek former swimmer, who specialized in butterfly events. Tsoy competed for Uzbekistan in the men's 400 m freestyle at the 2004 Summer Olympics in Athens. He achieved a FINA B-cut of 4:02.11 from the Kazakhstan Open Championships in Almaty. He challenged six other swimmers in heat one, including Qatar's 14-year-old Anas Abu-Yousuf and Philippines' two-time Olympian Miguel Mendoza. Entering the race with the fastest-seeded time, Tsoy faded down the final stretch to pick up a sixth seed in 4:16.91, more than fifteen seconds off the leading time set by Mendoza (4:01.99). Tsoy failed to reach the top 8 final, as he placed forty-fifth overall on the first day of prelims.
