= Boldizsár Kiss =

Hungarian swimmer (born 1985)

Personal information
- Full name: Boldizsár Kiss
- National team: Hungary
- Born: 8 April 1985 (age 41) Budapest, Hungary
- Height: 1.79 m (5 ft 10 in)
- Weight: 66 kg (146 lb)

Sport
- Sport: Swimming
- Strokes: Freestyle, butterfly
- Club: Ferencvárosi TC
- College team: Syracuse University (U.S.)
Medal record
Men's swimming
Representing Hungary
European Junior Championships
| Silver medal – second place | 2003 Glasgow | 200 m butterfly |

Boldizsár Kiss (born 8 April 1985) is a Hungarian former swimmer, who specialized in freestyle and butterfly events. He won a silver medal in the 200 m butterfly at the 2003 European Junior Swimming Championships in Glasgow, Scotland. Kiss is a member of the swimming team for Syracuse Orange, and a graduate of information management and technology at Syracuse University in New York.

Kiss qualified for the men's 400 m freestyle at the 2004 Summer Olympics in Athens, by eclipsing a FINA B-standard entry time of 3:57.86 from the national championships in Székesfehérvár. He challenged seven other swimmers on the third heat, where South Korea's Park Tae-Hwan was disqualified for a false start. He rounded out the field to last place by more than three seconds behind Brazil's Bruno Bonfim in 4:02.87. Kiss failed to advance into the final, as he placed thirty-eighth overall on the first day of preliminaries.
