= Jon Raahauge Rud =

Danish swimmer

Jon Rud
Personal information
- Full name: Jon Raahauge Rud
- Nationality: Danish
- Born: 11 February 1986 (age 40) Farum, Hovedstaden, Denmark
- Height: 1.87 m (6 ft 2 in)
- Weight: 84 kg (185 lb)

Sport
- Sport: Swimming
- Strokes: freestyle
- Club: West Swim Esbjerg

Jon Raahauge Rud (born 11 February 1986) is a Danish swimmer. He participated for the first time at the 2008 Olympics in the 200 metre freestyle and the 400 metre freestyle.

In July 2007, Rud competed at the Danish Open in Aarhus, Denmark with the West Swim Esbjerg swimming club. He finished second in the Men's 400 metre freestyle, second in the Men's 200 metre freestyle, third in the Men's 800 metre freestyle relay, fifth in the Men's 400 metre freestyle relay, and fourth in the Men's 400 metre medley relay.

In March 2008, Rud finished eighth in the 400 metre freestyle at the European Championships held in Eindhoven (Netherlands).

In April 2009, Rud participated in the Denmark Long Course National Championships at Esbjerg, Denmark. He finished eighth in the Men's 800 freestyle and 11th in the Men's 400 medley relay.

== Personal background ==
In 2008, following his participation in the summer Olympics, Rud enrolled at Handelshøjskolen I København (Copenhagen Business School), from where he is pursuing his BSc in Economics and business administration.

In August 2010, Rud announced that he had lost his motivation and was retiring from his professional career as a swimmer. At that time, he accepted an offer to serve as the assistant coach of a high performance swim team at Sigma Nordsjælland.

== 2008 Summer Olympic results ==
| Age | City | Sport | Event | Team | Rank |
|---|---|---|---|---|---|
| 22 | Beijing | Swimming | Men's 200 metres Freestyle | Denmark | 31 |
| 22 | Beijing | Swimming | Men's 400 metres Freestyle | Denmark | 34 |

Men's 200 metres Freestyle

| Age | City | Sport | Country | Phase | Unit | Rank | Time | Reaction | Lane |
|---|---|---|---|---|---|---|---|---|---|
| 22 | Beijing | Swimming | Denmark | Round One | Heat Four | 2 | 1:48.96 | 0.74 | 7 |

Men's 400 metres Freestyle

| Age | City | Sport | Country | Phase | Unit | Rank | Time | Reaction | Lane |
|---|---|---|---|---|---|---|---|---|---|
| 22 | Beijing | Swimming | Denmark | Round One | Heat Two | 7 | 3:57.41 | 0.73 | 2 |

== 2008 European Aquatics Championships ==
| event | time | Team | Time | Club | Date | Country | City |
|---|---|---|---|---|---|---|---|
| 4×200 m freestyle relay | 7:19.56 | 1. Jacob Carstensen; 2. Jon Rud; 3. Emil Dall-Nielsen; 4. Jakob Andkjær | 1:49.97; 1:48.33; 1:51.38; 1:49.88 | Denmark | 23 Mar 2008 | Netherlands | Eindhoven |
