= Łukasz Drzewiński =

Polish swimmer (born 1984)

Personal information
- Full name: Łukasz Drzewiński
- National team: Poland
- Born: 9 March 1984 (age 42) Gorzów Wielkopolski, Poland
- Height: 1.85 m (6 ft 1 in)
- Weight: 77 kg (170 lb)

Sport
- Sport: Swimming
- Strokes: Freestyle, butterfly
- Club: AZS Warszawa
- Coach: Robert Białecki
Medal record
Men's swimming
Representing Poland
European Junior Championships
Silver medal – second place	2002 Linz	200 m butterfly

Łukasz Drzewiński (born 9 March 1984) is a Polish former swimmer, who specialized in freestyle and butterfly events. Drzewinski won a silver medal in the 200 m butterfly at the 2002 European Junior Swimming Championships in Linz, Austria with a time of 2:00.21, edging out Ukraine's Serhiy Advena by 0.04 of a second. He is a member of the swimming team for AZS Warszawa, and is coached and trained by Roberta Białeckiego.

Drzewinski qualified for the men's 400 m freestyle at the 2004 Summer Olympics in Athens, by finishing second from the Olympic test event, in an A-standard time of 3:51.44. Drzewinski failed to qualify for the final, as he placed fourteenth out of 47 swimmers in the morning's preliminary heats, lowering his entry time to 3:50.97. In the 200 m freestyle, Drzewinski challenged seven other swimmers on the fifth heat, including three-time Olympian Jacob Carstensen of Denmark. He came only in sixth by 0.12 of a second behind Portugal's Luís Monteiro with a time of 1:51.90. Drzewinski failed to advance into the semifinals, as he placed thirtieth overall in the preliminaries.
