= David Davies (swimmer) =

Welsh competitive swimmer

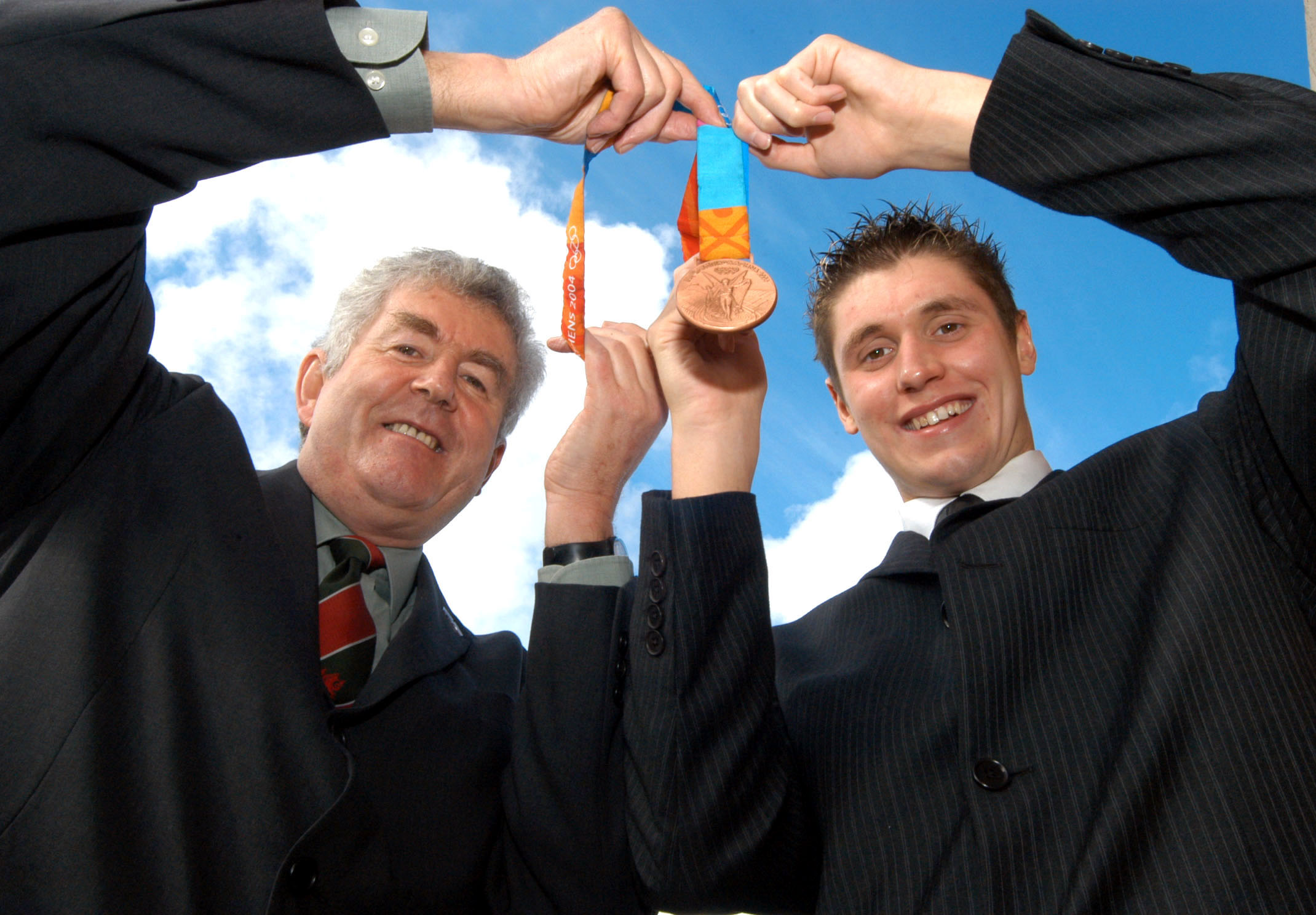
- Davies (right) with First Minister of Wales Rhodri Morgan in 2004

Personal information
- Full name: David Michael Rhys Davies
- Nickname: "Dai Splash"
- National team: Great Britain
- Born: 3 March 1985 (age 41) Barry, Wales
- Height: 1.90 m (6 ft 3 in)
- Weight: 84 kg (185 lb; 13.2 st)

Sport
- Sport: Swimming
- Strokes: Freestyle
- Club: City of Cardiff
- Coach: Dave Haller
Medal record
Men's swimming
Representing Great Britain
Olympic Games
Silver medal – second place	2008 Beijing	10 km marathon
Bronze medal – third place	2004 Athens	1500 m freestyle
World Championships (LC)
Bronze medal – third place	2005 Montreal	1500 m freestyle
Bronze medal – third place	2007 Melbourne	1500 m freestyle
World Championships (SC)
Silver medal – second place	2008 Manchester	1500 m freestyle
European Championships (LC)
Silver medal – second place	2008 Eindhoven	1500 m freestyle
European Championships (SC)
Silver medal – second place	2002 Riesa	1500 m freestyle
Silver medal – second place	2004 Vienna	1500 m freestyle
Silver medal – second place	2005 Trieste	1500 m freestyle
Representing Wales
Commonwealth Games
Gold medal – first place	2006 Melbourne	1500 m freestyle
Bronze medal – third place	2006 Melbourne	400 m freestyle

David Michael Rhys Davies (born 3 March 1985) is a Welsh former competitive swimmer who has represented Wales at the Commonwealth Games, and swam for Great Britain in Olympic, World and European competition. He is the 2006 Commonwealth Games champion at 1500 metres freestyle and holds the rare distinction of having won medals in all six major long-course and short-course international championships available to him, including 2 x at the Olympic Games, 2 x at the World Championships, 1 x at the World Championships (25m), 1 x at the European Championships, 3x at the European Championships (25m) and finally 2x at the Commonwealth Games.

Born in Barry, Vale of Glamorgan, Davies swam for British Hall of Fame Coach David Haller at the City of Cardiff Swim Club in Wales. He swam for Wales at the 2002 and 2006 Commonwealth Games.

Throughout his career as an elite competitor, Davies focused on long-distance freestyle and open water events, as they required more demanding training than shorter freestyle events to achieve the level of endurance required to compete.

== Swimming career ==
At the 2003 European Junior Championships he won a gold medal. He also swam at the 2004 European Championships and the 2005 World Championships.

At the 2006 Commonwealth Games in Melbourne, Australia, Davies won the 1,500 freestyle and was third in the 400 freestyle. In 2008, he finished second in the 1500 free at the 2008 Short Course Worlds.

Davies qualified for the Olympics 10K at the 2008 Open Water World Championships in Seville, Spain where he finished just 0.03 behind the winner.

As noted below, he represented Great Britain at the 2004, 2008 and 2012 Olympics. As of the end of 2010, he held the British Records in the 400-, 800- and 1500-metre freestyle events.

== 2004 Bronze, Athens Olympics ==
At the 2004 Olympics, he placed third in the 1500 meter final with a time of 14:45.95. Despite a highly competitive eight person field, the 1500 meter final became a three-way contest between Grant Hackett of Australia, Larsen Jensen of the USA and Davies as the three-man group broke away from the rest of the field in the early race. Aussie Larsen Jenson gradually drew away from his two close pursuers in the late stages to maintain his 1500 meter title in Olympic record time. American Jensen held off Davies' challenge to take the silver. Although little known at event time, Grant Hackett was swimming despite suffering from a partially collapsed lung and was competing at only three-quarter capacity.

== 2008 Silver, Beijing Olympics ==
Davies represented Great Britain at the 2008 Olympics, swimming in both the pool competition and open water race. In the men's 1500m freestyle race, he finished 6th. In the open-water 10K race in Beijing, Davies finished second, taking silver in the new Olympic event. Shortly after finishing the event, there was concern for Davies' health as first aid staff carried him off on a stretcher. Davies told the BBC shortly afterward: "For the last part of it I was delirious, I wanted it so bad. I've given it everything – the stretcher at the end was a bit mad but I've got something to show for it. I felt a bit violated to be honest, people swimming all over me, and the last lap was a real struggle.".

== 2012 London Olympics ==
At the 2012 Olympics, after suffering from issues with his technique and form in 2011, Davies managed to qualify for the British team for the games in London. In the Olympic preliminaries, he was unable to make the 1,500 final, placing 16th in the stiff competition of the prelims with a time of 15:44.77.

Three months after the London Olympics, Davies announced his retirement and began working as an athlete mentor with project Sport Wales.

== Personal bests and records held ==
Long course (50 m)

Event	Time		Date	Meet	Location	Ref
400 m freestyle	3:45.24	NR	16 Mar 2009	British Championships	Sheffield, England	
800 m freestyle	7:44.32	NR	29 Jul 2009	World Championships	Rome, Italy	
1500 m freestyle	14:45.95	NR	21 Aug 2004	Olympic Games	Athens, Greece	

Short course (25 m)

Event	Time		Date	Meet	Location	Ref
400 m freestyle	3:45.08		12 Dec 2005	European SC Championships	Trieste, Italy	
800 m freestyle	7:49.06		14 Nov 2008	British Universities SC Championships	Sheffield, England	
1500 m freestyle	14:32.56	NR	11 Dec 2004	European SC Championships	Vienna, Austria	

Legend: WR – World record; ER – European record; CR – Commonwealth record; NR – British record; e – equalled existing record;
Records not set in finals: h – heat; sf – semifinal; r – relay 1st leg; rh – relay heat 1st leg; b – B final; † – en route to final mark; so – swim-off; tt – time trial

== See also ==
- List of Commonwealth Games medallists in swimming (men)
- List of Olympic medalists in swimming (men)
