= Maciej Hreniak =

Polish swimmer

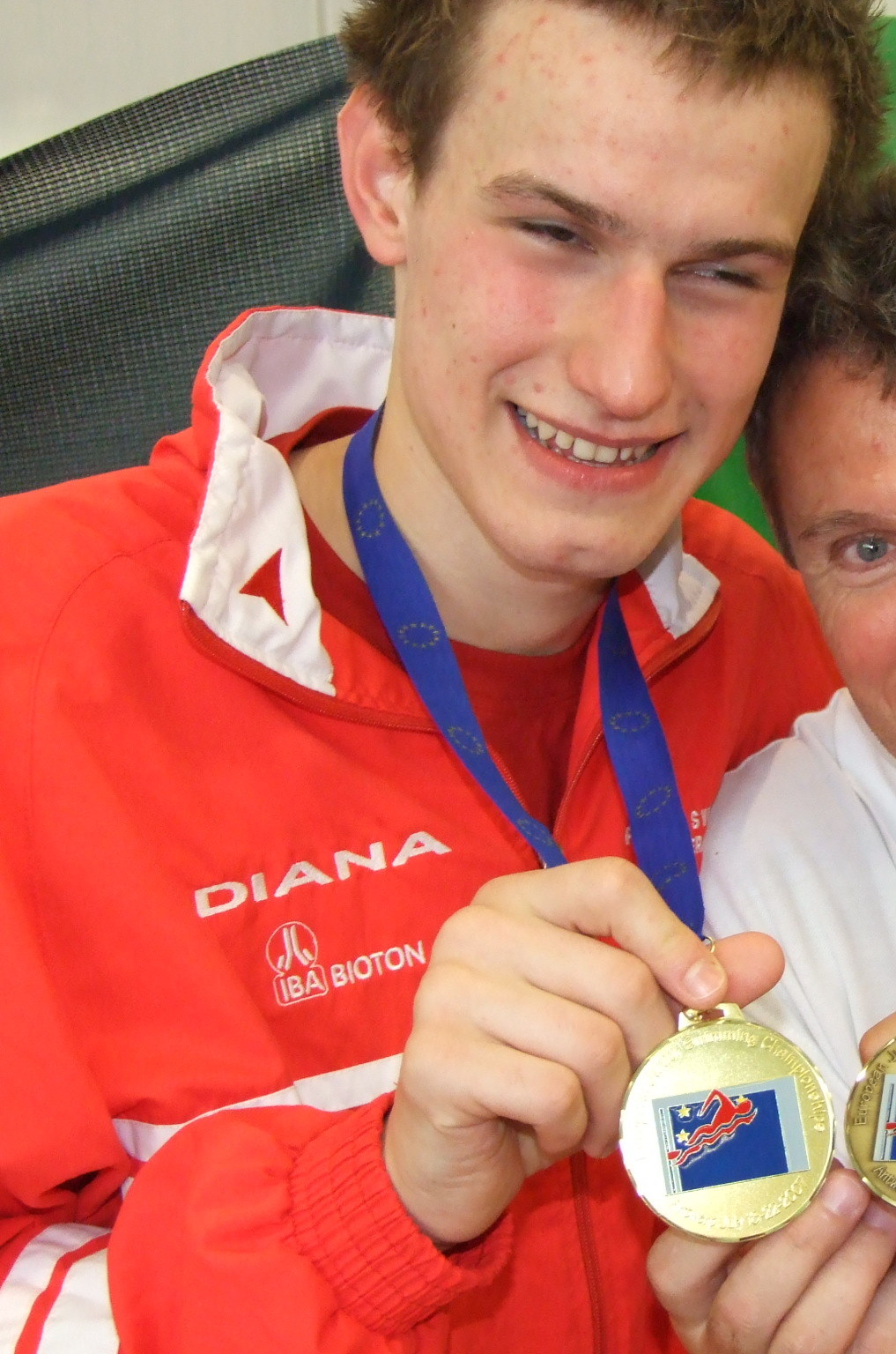

Personal information
- Full name: Maciej Hreniak
- National team: Poland
- Born: 3 May 1989 (age 37) Brodnica, Poland
- Height: 1.93 m (6 ft 4 in)
- Weight: 77 kg (170 lb)

Sport
- Sport: Swimming
- Strokes: Freestyle
- Club: UKS Ruch Grudziądz
- Coach: Marek Dorywaiski
Medal record
Men's swimming
Representing Poland
World Junior Championships
Gold medal – first place	2006 Rio de Janeiro	800 m freestyle
Gold medal – first place	2006 Rio de Janeiro	1500 m freestyle
European Junior Championships
Gold medal – first place	2007 Antwerp	800 m freestyle
Gold medal – first place	2007 Antwerp	1500 m freestyle
Bronze medal – third place	2006 Palma	1500 m freestyle

Maciej Hreniak (born May 3, 1989) is a Polish swimmer, who specialized in long-distance freestyle events. He represented his nation Poland at the 2008 Summer Olympics, and has won a career total of five medals (four golds and one bronze) in a major international competition, spanning the two editions of the European Junior Championships (2006 and 2007), and the 2006 FINA Youth World Swimming Championships in Rio de Janeiro, Brazil. Hreniak is a member of UKS Ruch Grudziądz, and is coached and trained by Marek Dorywaiski.

Hreniak competed for the Polish squad in the men's 1500 m freestyle at the 2008 Summer Olympics in Beijing. He posted a lifetime best of 15:10.78 to dominate the longest-distance freestyle and beat the insurmountable FINA A-cut (15:13.16) at the European Junior Championships a year earlier in Antwerp. Swimming as the fastest entrant in heat four, Hreniak managed to strengthen his pace from start to finish before taking the fourth spot in 15:16.16, just a wide five-second gap between him and the top three swimmers led by France's Nicolas Rostoucher. With only eight swimmers qualifying for the final, Hreniak stumbled down the leaderboard to twenty-fourth overall and did not advance past the prelims.
