= Fernando Costa =

Portuguese swimmer

Fernando Costa SK02
Personal information
- Full name: Fernando Eurico de Barros; Oliveira da Fonseca e Costa
- National team: Portugal
- Born: 29 April 1985 (age 41) Porto, Portugal
- Height: 1.81 m (5 ft 11 in)
- Weight: 58 kg (128 lb)

Sport
- Sport: Swimming
- Strokes: Freestyle
- Club: Leixões Sport Clube
- College team: Wayne State University (U.S.)
- Coach: José Baltar Leite

Fernando Eurico de Barros Oliveira da Fonseca e Costa (also Fernando Costa, born 29 April 1985) is a Portuguese former swimmer, who specialized in long-distance freestyle events. He is a two-time Olympian, and currently holds the Portuguese record in the 1500 m freestyle from the 2007 Summer Universiade in Bangkok, Thailand.

Costa made his first Portuguese team, as a 19-year-old, at the 2004 Summer Olympics in Athens, Greece, where he competed in the men's 1500 m freestyle. Swimming in last out of five heats, Costa closed out the field with an eighth-place finish and twenty-first overall in 15:32.55, more than thirty seconds behind the winner Yuri Prilukov of Russia.

At the 2008 Summer Olympics in Beijing, Costa qualified for the second time in the men's 1500 m freestyle, by clearing a FINA B-standard entry time of 15:16.22 from the 2007 Summer Universiade in Bangkok, Thailand. Costa challenged six other swimmers on the second heat, including three-time Olympians Dragoș Coman of Romania, and Nicolas Rostoucher of France. He raced to sixth place by two seconds behind Coman in 15:26.21. Costa failed to advance into the final for the second time, as he placed twenty-ninth overall in the prelims.

Costa is also a former member and a student assistant coach of the swimming team for the Wayne State Warriors, and a graduate of nutrition and food science at Wayne State University in Detroit, Michigan.
