= Christian Kubusch =

German swimmer

Personal information
- Born: 26 April 1988 (age 38) Gera, East Germany
- Height: 1.94 m (6 ft 4 in)
- Weight: 86 kg (190 lb)

Sport
- Sport: Swimming
- Club: SC Magdeburg
Medal record
Men's swimming
Representing Germany
European Championships
Silver medal – second place	2010 Budapest	800 m freestyle

Christian Kubusch (born 26 April 1988) is a German freestyle swimmer who won a silver medal in the 800 m freestyle at the 2010 European Aquatics Championships, setting a national record. He also competed at the 2008 Summer Olympics in two events but was eliminated in preliminaries.
