= Bojan Zdešar =

Slovenian swimmer

Personal information
- Full name: Bojan Zdešar
- Nationality: Slovenia
- Born: November 30, 1984 (age 41) Ljubljana
- Height: 1.87 m (6 ft 2 in)
- Weight: 86 kg (190 lb)

Sport
- Sport: Swimming
- Strokes: Freestyle
- Club: Plavalni Klub Ilirija

Bojan Zdešar (born November 30, 1984) is a retired male freestyle swimmer from Slovenia, who competed for his native country at the 2004 Summer Olympics. He swam in the long-distance swimming events.
