= Nenad Buljan =

Croatian swimmer (born 1978)

Personal information
- Born: January 13, 1978 (age 48) Zagreb, Yugoslavia

Sport
- Sport: Swimming

Nenad Buljan (born 13 January 1978) is a freestyle swimmer from Croatia, who made his Olympic debut for his native country at the 2004 Summer Olympics in Athens, Greece. There he competed in the 400 m and 1500 m Freestyle, but was eliminated in the heats of both events.
