= Mateusz Sawrymowicz =

Polish swimmer

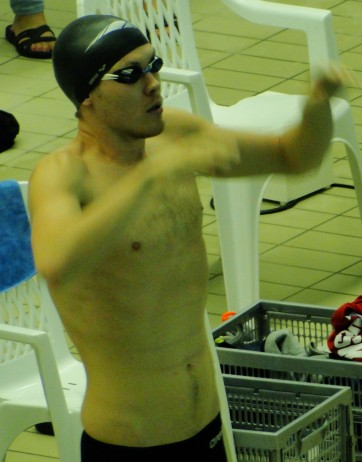
- Mateusz Sawrymowicz in 2012

Personal information
- Full name: Mateusz Sawrymowicz
- Nationality: Poland
- Born: 22 April 1987 (age 39) Lublin, Poland
- Height: 1.85 m (6 ft 1 in)
- Weight: 75 kg (165 lb)

Sport
- Sport: Swimming
- Strokes: freestyle
Medal record
Men's swimming
Representing Poland
World Championships (LC)
Gold medal – first place	2007 Melbourne	1500 m freestyle
World Championships (SC)
Bronze medal – third place	2008 Manchester	1500 m freestyle
European Championships (LC)
Bronze medal – third place	2008 Eindhoven	1500 m freestyle
European Championships (SC)
Gold medal – first place	2007 Debrecen	1500 m freestyle
Gold medal – first place	2011 Szczecin	1500 m freestyle
Silver medal – second place	2006 Helsinki	1500 m freestyle
Bronze medal – third place	2005 Trieste	1500 m freestyle

Mateusz Sawrymowicz (born 22 April 1987 in Lublin) is a Polish swimmer who specializes in the 1500 m freestyle. Having won in Melbourne in 2007 he became the first person to beat Grant Hackett at the 1500 m in the World Championships for 10 years. Later in the year in Debrecen, he became the first person to beat Yury Prilukov in the European Short Course Championships for 5 years.

Sawrymowicz originally touched 4th at the 2012 World Short Course Championships in Istanbul, and was later awarded a bronze medal after the disqualification of Mads Glaesner, the gold medalist, for an anti-doping violation.

However, upon appeal to the Court of Arbitration for Sport, Glaesner's 1500-meter freestyle gold medal was reinstated based on the fact that a test after that race, two days after his initial positive test following the 400-meter free, was clean. He still forfeited the 400-meter freestyle bronze, which he did not appeal. This means that Sawrymowicz's official position was returned to 4th place in the 1500-meter freestyle.

Awards
Preceded by (Hungary) László Cseh	European Swimmer of the Year; 2007	Succeeded by Alain Bernard
