= Xin Tong =

Chinese swimmer (born 1987)

Personal information
- Born: January 6, 1987 (age 39) Harbin, Heilongjiang, China

Sport
- Sport: Swimming

Xin Tong (born January 6, 1987) is a Chinese swimmer, who competed for Team China at the 2008 Summer Olympics.

== Major achievements ==
- 2003/2004 National Champions Tournament - 1st 4×200 m freestyle relay
- 2003 National Championships - 1st 4×200 m freestyle relay
- 2003 National Short-Course Championships - 1st 4×200 m freestyle relay
