= Oussama Mellouli =

Tunisian swimmer (born 1984)

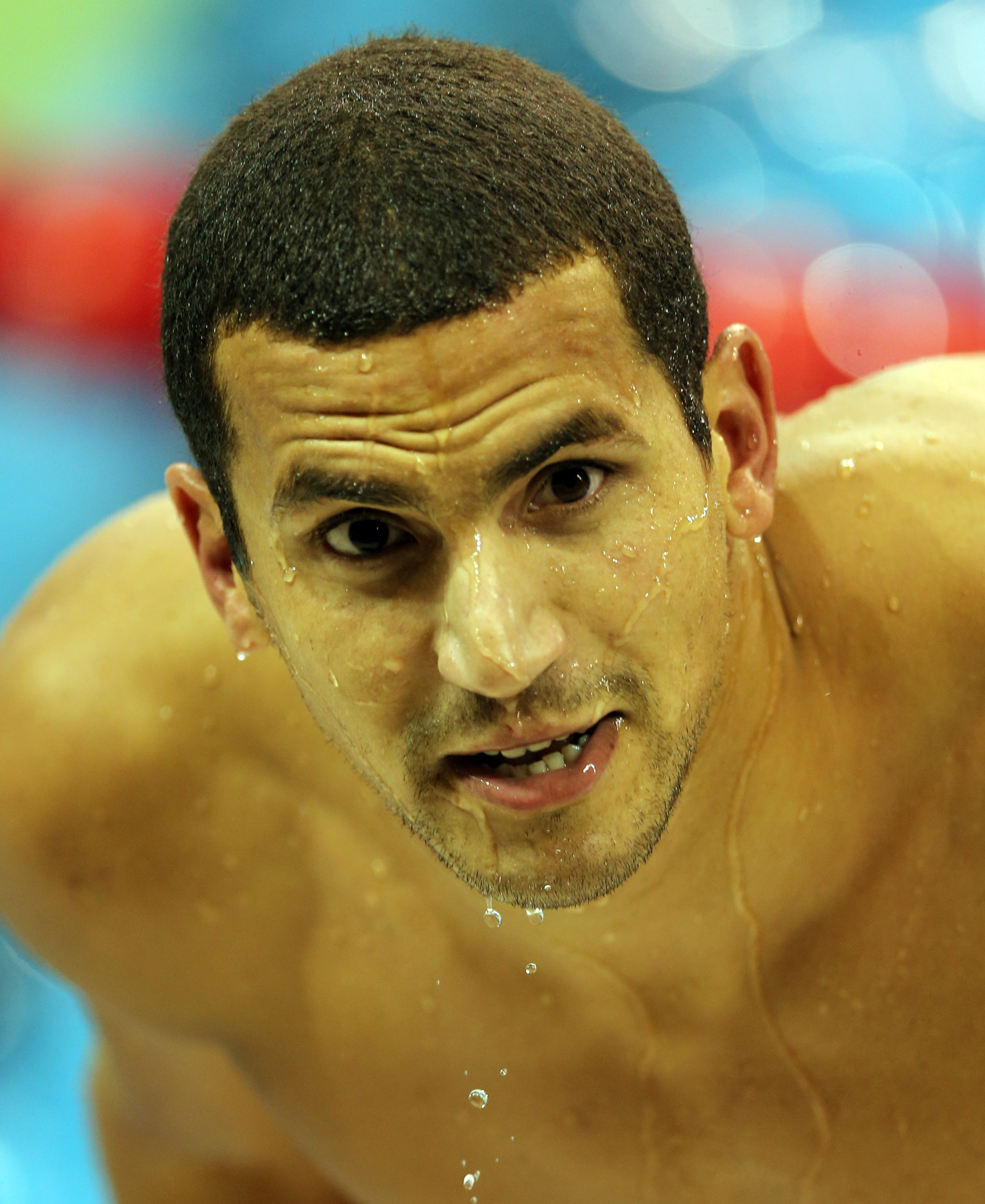
- Oussama Mellouli in 2013

Personal information
- Native name: يوسف الملولي
- Full name: Oussama Mellouli
- Nicknames: The Mediterranean's Shark, The Shark of Carthage, Ous
- Nationality: Tunisia
- Born: 16 February 1984 (age 42) La Marsa, Tunisia
- Height: 1.92 m (6 ft 4 in)
- Weight: 84 kg (185 lb)

Sport
- Sport: Swimming
- Strokes: Free, IM
- Club: Esperance of Tunisia
- College team: USC Trojans (USA)
- Coach: Dave Salo (USC)
Medal record
Olympic Games
Gold medal – first place	2008 Beijing	1500 m freestyle
Gold medal – first place	2012 London	10 km marathon
Bronze medal – third place	2012 London	1500 m freestyle
World Championships (LC)
Gold medal – first place	2009 Rome	1500 m freestyle
Gold medal – first place	2013 Barcelona	5 km open water
Silver medal – second place	2009 Rome	400 m freestyle
Silver medal – second place	2009 Rome	800 m freestyle
Bronze medal – third place	2003 Barcelona	400 m medley
Bronze medal – third place	2005 Montreal	400 m freestyle
Bronze medal – third place	2005 Montreal	400 m medley
Bronze medal – third place	2013 Barcelona	10 km open water
World Championships (SC)
Gold medal – first place	2004 Indianapolis	400 m medley
Gold medal – first place	2010 Dubai	1500 m freestyle
Silver medal – second place	2010 Dubai	400 m medley
Silver medal – second place	2014 Doha	1500 m freestyle
Bronze medal – third place	2004 Indianapolis	200 m medley
Bronze medal – third place	2010 Dubai	200 m freestyle
Bronze medal – third place	2010 Dubai	400 m freestyle
Mediterranean Games
Gold medal – first place	2005 Almería	800 m freestyle
Gold medal – first place	2005 Almería	200 m medley
Gold medal – first place	2005 Almería	400 m medley
Gold medal – first place	2009 Pescara	200 m freestyle
Gold medal – first place	2009 Pescara	200 m medley
Gold medal – first place	2009 Pescara	400 m freestyle
Gold medal – first place	2009 Pescara	400 m medley
Gold medal – first place	2009 Pescara	1500 m freestyle
Gold medal – first place	2013 Mersin	400 m medley
Gold medal – first place	2013 Mersin	1500 m freestyle
Silver medal – second place	2001 Tunis	400 m medley
Silver medal – second place	2013 Mersin	200 m freestyle
Silver medal – second place	2013 Mersin	200 m medley
Silver medal – second place	2013 Mersin	400 m freestyle
Pan Arab Games
Gold medal – first place	2011 Doha	50 m freestyle
Gold medal – first place	2011 Doha	100 m freestyle
Gold medal – first place	2011 Doha	200 m freestyle
Gold medal – first place	2011 Doha	400 m freestyle
Gold medal – first place	2011 Doha	1500 m freestyle
Gold medal – first place	2011 Doha	100 m backstroke
Gold medal – first place	2011 Doha	200 m backstroke
Gold medal – first place	2011 Doha	200 m breaststroke
Gold medal – first place	2011 Doha	50 m butterfly
Gold medal – first place	2011 Doha	100 m butterfly
Gold medal – first place	2011 Doha	200 m butterfly
Gold medal – first place	2011 Doha	200 m medley
Gold medal – first place	2011 Doha	400 m medley
Gold medal – first place	2011 Doha	4×100 m freestyle
Gold medal – first place	2011 Doha	4×200 m freestyle
Silver medal – second place	2011 Doha	4×100 m medley

Oussama "Ous" Mellouli (Arabic: أسامة الملولي; born 16 February 1984) is a Tunisian swimmer who competes in the freestyle and medley events. He is a three-time Olympic medalist, is an African record holder, and trains with the USC Trojans team based at the University of Southern California, where he studied as a computer science undergraduate and swam collegiately.

Since returning from an Adderall-related drug ban, Mellouli was the 1500 m freestyle World champion at the 2009 World Aquatics Championships with a winning time of 14:37.28, then the second-best performance of all time. Mellouli was the gold medalist in the 1500 freestyle at the 2008 Olympics, the bronze medalist in the 1500 freestyle at the 2012 Olympics, and the gold medalist in the 10 km marathon swim at the 2012 Olympics. He is the first Olympian to win medals in both the open water and the pool in a single Olympics.

== Early life ==
Born in Tunis, Mellouli left Tunisia at the age of 15 to study and train in France. He enrolled in USC Viterbi School of Engineering in 2003 after graduating from the Lycee Technologique du Rempart in Marseille, France. He swam for the USC Trojans under Head Coach Dave Salo and graduated in 2007 with a computer science bachelor's degree. He is a scholarship holder with the Olympic Solidarity program.

== 2000 Sydney Olympics ==
At the 2000 Olympics in Sydney, Australia he finished 43rd in the 400 IM.

=== 2001 ===
Mellouli won 1 silver medal in the 400m IM at the 2001 Mediterranean Games, in Tunis, Tunisia.

=== 2003 ===
Mellouli first established himself on the world scene at the 2003 World Championships in Barcelona, Spain, where he won a bronze in the 400m Individual Medley finishing behind László Cseh and a world record performance from Michael Phelps.

=== 2004 ===
At the 2004 Olympics, he finished 5th in the 400 IM, setting the African Record in the process. He further distinguished himself at the 2004 FINA Short Course World Championships in Indianapolis, USA, where he won the first international-level gold medal in swimming for Tunisia, in the 400m IM, finishing over a second ahead of second and third-place finishers Robin Francis and Eric Shanteau. Later, at the meet, he would win bronze in the 200m IM.

=== 2005 ===
He was able to better his Athens mark with his bronze medal swim in the 400 IM event at the 2005 World Aquatics Championships in Montreal, Canada. He also won the bronze medal in the 400 freestyle at that same event. He also won three gold medals (800 m freestyle, 400m medley, 200m medley) at the XVth Mediterranean Games in Almería, Spain.

=== 2006 ===
On 1 December 2006, Oussama Mellouli beat Michael Phelps in the 400m IM at the U.S. Open in West Lafayette: Mellouli clocked 4:15.61, ahead of Phelps with 4:18.32. This swim was subsequently placed within Mellouli's 18-month doping ban, and the results nullified, as the drug test where the banned substance was found occurred at this meet (see the section below for further information).

=== 2007 ===
On 19 February 2007, he broke his own African Record in the 200m individual medley for the fourth time since 2003 at the USA Swimming Grand Prix meet, held at the Mizzou Aquatic Center at the University of Missouri. He also set a new African record in the 400 meter individual medley.

On 25 March 2007, he won the silver in the 400 m freestyle (3:45.12) at the 2007 World Championships in Melbourne, Australia. Three days later, on 28 March, he swam to the first Tunisian World Championship in swimming, winning the 800m freestyle in a then African Record of 7:46.95 — one of the top 10 fastest times ever. However, due to his positive drug-testing result from an in-competition test from December 2006 and the 18-month competition ban imposed on him on 11 September 2007 by the Court of Arbitration for Sport (CAS), retroactive from 30 November 2006 forward, his 2007 World Championships results have been nullified. He was also a finalist in the 400 m individual medley, where he originally finished fourth in 4:11.68.

Following the 11 September 2007 ruling by CAS, Mellouli was not allowed to compete again until mid-2008. Mellouli's results from 2007 have been nullified, per his September 2007 doping suspension, related to his positive test from December 2006 (see the section below).

== 2008 Beijing Olympics ==
Mellouli came into the 2008 Olympics in Beijing, China entered two events, the 400m and 1500m freestyle events. In his first event, the 400m free, despite setting a new African record in the final, he could only manage fifth place in a time of 3:43.45. Mellouli would go on to win the 1500m freestyle and set a new African record. In doing so, he became the first African male swimmer to ever win an Olympic gold medal in an individual swimming event (the South African men's 4 × 100 m Free Relay won the event at the 2004 Olympics).

=== 2009 ===
Mellouli won 5 gold medals (200m and 400m individual medley, and 200m, 400m, and 1500m freestyles) at the XVI Mediterranean Games in Pescara, Italy.

In the 2009 World Aquatics Championships, held in Rome during the summer, Mellouli won a gold medal in the 1500 meter freestyle and two silver medals in the 400 meter freestyle and 800 meter freestyle.

=== 2010 ===
Mellouli won 4 medals ( 1 gold in the 1500 freestyle, 1 silver in the 400 medley, and 2 bronzes in the 200 m freestyle and the 400 m freestyle) at the 2010 FINA Short Course World Championships (25m) in Dubai, UAE.

=== 2011 ===
Mellouli won 16 medals ( 15 gold and 1 silver ) at the 2011 Pan Arab Games in Doha, Qatar.

== 2012 London Olympics ==
Mellouli won 2 medals (1 gold in the 10km marathon and 1 bronze in the 1500m freestyle) at the 2012 Summer Olympics held in London, UK. He became the first person to win medals in the pool and open-water swimming in the same Olympics.

=== 2013 ===
Mellouli won 1 gold medal in the 5km marathon at the 2013 World Championships, in Barcelona, Spain.

=== 2016 Olympics ===
Mellouli participated in two competitions in Rio 2016 Summer Olympics but did not win any medals. In the 1500m freestyle, he came first in his heat with 15:07.78 (considerably slower than his London 2012 Summer Olympics time of 14:40.31) but ranked 21st in the competition and thus did not qualify for the final. He also competed in the 10km marathon, finishing in 12th place with 1:53:06 (+0:00:07 of the gold winner).

=== 2020 Olympics ===
In July 2021, Mellouli had initially decided to withdraw from the 2020 Summer Olympics in Tokyo due to a dispute with the Tunisian federation for alleged forgery since 2017. However, he later announced that he would compete at the Tokyo Games, as the Tunisian Olympic Committee President Mahrez Boussian had promised to settle the dispute.

=== 2021 Olympics ===
On Wednesday, August 4, 2021, Tunisian swimmer Oussama Mellouli finished 20th in the 10 km open water marathon at the Tokyo Olympics. Mellouli was thus unable to earn another medal on his sixth appearance at the Olympic Games.

== 2006 anti-doping rule violation and ban ==
Mellouli tested positive for Adderall, a banned stimulant, during the 2006 U.S. Open, but this only became publicly known after the 2007 World Championships. FINA discovered that Tunisian authorities had known about the result, but had only issued him a warning. FINA referred the case to the Court of Arbitration for Sport (CAS). Mellouli admitted taking the drug without a prescription, saying it was to help with academic work. In September 2007, CAS imposed an 18-month ban retroactive to 30 November 2006 and also disqualified all his results from that date through 2007, including at the World Championships.

== Achievements ==
- 2013 World Championships – 1 gold medal (5 km marathon) and 1 bronze medal (10 k marathon)
- 2012 Summer Olympics – gold medal (10 km marathon) and bronze medal (1500 m freestyle).
- 2009 World Championships – 1 gold medal (1500 m freestyle) and 2 silver medals (400 m freestyle, 800 m freestyle)
- 2008 Summer Olympics – gold medal (1500 m freestyle)
- 2005 World Championships – bronze medal (400m individual medley and 400m freestyle)
- 2004 Olympic Games – fifth place (400 m individual medley)
- 2004 FINA Short Course World Championships – bronze medal (200 m individual medley)
- 2004 FINA Short Course World Championships – gold medal (400 m individual medley)
- 2003 World Championships – bronze medal (400 m individual medley)

== See also ==
- Tunisia at the 2012 Summer Olympics

Awards
Preceded by (South Africa) Roland Schoeman	African Swimmer of the Year; 2008, 2009 (with (South Africa) Cameron van der Burgh)	Succeeded by (South Africa) Cameron van der Burgh
Preceded by (Germany) Thomas Lurz and (Greece) Spyridon Gianniotis	Open Water Swimmer of the Year; 2012	Succeeded by Incumbent
Preceded by (Germany) Thomas Lurz	FINA Open Water Swimmer of the Year; 2012	Succeeded by (Germany) Thomas Lurz
Olympic Games
Preceded by Heykel Megannem	Flagbearer for Tunisia; Rio de Janeiro 2016	Succeeded by Inès Boubakri Mehdi Ben Cheikh
