= Larsen Jensen =

American swimmer (born 1985)

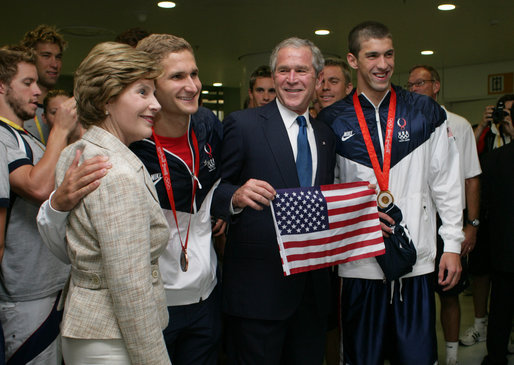
- President George W. Bush and Laura Bush with Larsen Jensen and Michael Phelps

Personal information
- Full name: Larsen Alan Jensen
- Nickname: "Larjo"
- National team: United States
- Born: September 1, 1985 (age 41) Bakersfield, California, U.S.
- Height: 6 ft 0 in (183 cm)
- Weight: 194 lb (88 kg)

Sport
- Sport: Swimming
- Strokes: Freestyle
- Club: Mission Viejo Nadadores
- College team: University of Southern California
- Coach: Mark Schubert (USC); Bill Rose (Mission Viejo)
Medal record
Men's swimming
Representing the United States
Olympic Games
Silver medal – second place	2004 Athens	1500 m freestyle
Bronze medal – third place	2008 Beijing	400 m freestyle
World Championships (LC)
Silver medal – second place	2003 Barcelona	800 m freestyle
Silver medal – second place	2005 Montreal	800 m freestyle
Silver medal – second place	2005 Montreal	1500 m freestyle
World Championships (SC)
Bronze medal – third place	2006 Shanghai	4×200 m freestyle
Pan Pacific Championships
Silver medal – second place	2002 Yokohama	800 m freestyle
Bronze medal – third place	2002 Yokohama	1500 m freestyle

Larsen Alan Jensen (born September 1, 1985) is an American former competition swimmer and a two-time Olympic medalist.

== Early life ==
Larsen Jensen was born September 1, 1985, in Bakersfield, California and learned to swim in a backyard pool from his mother Barbara, a former distance freestyler who nearly made the Olympics. He attended Bakersfield's Garces Memorial High School, and trained and competed for Bakersfield Swim Club under Coach Jim Richey. He swam as part of his High School team only in his Freshman and Senior years, as rules restricted club swimmers from swimming with their High School teams. He began swimming with the Mission Viejo Nadadores under Head Coach Bill Rose in the summer prior to his High School Senior year.

Jensen made the finals in the 2002 Winter nationals in the 800-meter freestyle. At the Pan Pacific Championships in Yokohama, Japan in August 2002, Jenson broke the American record for the 800-meter freestyle with a time of 7:52.45, finishing second and earned a bronze in the 1500-meter freestyle.

At the 2003 World Championships, Jensen earned a silver medal in the 800-meter freestyle, his first medal at the international level.

Beginning in the Fall of 2003, Jenson attended and swam for the University of Southern California under Hall of Fame Coach Mark Schubert. As a Senior at USC, at the March, 2007 NCAA championships, Larson set a USC record swimming the 500 freestyle in 4:09.80, though he fell short of the U.S. record.

=== Olympics, 2004-8 ===
After completing his first year at USC, Jenson placed second in the July, 2004 Olympic trials in Long Beach in the 400-meter freestyle with a time of 3:46.56 earning a spot on the U.S. team. Having benefitted from the distance training, a specialty of Bill Rose and the Nadadores, he placed first in the trial finals of the 1500-meter freestyle with a time of 14:56.71.

He competed in the 2004 Summer Olympics in Athens, winning silver in the 1,500-meter freestyle, while setting a new American record of 14:45.29. He also competed in the 400-meter freestyle, where he finished fourth.

Four years later, having graduated USC, Jenson competed in the 2008 Summer Olympics in Beijing, where he won the bronze medal in the 400-meter freestyle with a time of 3:42.78, who moved into third place near the end of the race. Jenson placed fifth in the 1,500-meter freestyle with a time of 14:48.16 with Oussama Mellouli of Tunesia taking the gold in an upset win.

At the 2005 World Aquatics Championships, he won silver medals in the 800 and 1,500-meter freestyle races. Jensen completed his degree in political science with a minor in business at the University of Southern California in 2007.

Jensen has been an American record holder in the 400-meter freestyle and a former American record holder in the 1,500-meter freestyle.

=== Post-swimming careers ===
After Jensen's swimming career ended, he took a career in the military enlisting in the United States Navy and completing Officer Candidate School in 2009 eventually gaining a commission as an Ensign. He trained for two years to receive his SEAL trident, and completed several tours in Afghanistan and other combat areas, serving as a SEAL from 2009 to 2014. Larsen married his wife Emily in July, 2013.

Following his retirement from the military, Larsen enrolled into Stanford Graduate School of Business and obtained an MBA.

== Personal bests (long course) ==
Event	Time	Date
400 m freestyle	3:42.78	August 10, 2008
1500 m freestyle	14:45.29	August 21, 2004

== See also ==
- List of Olympic medalists in swimming (men)
- List of University of Southern California people
- List of World Aquatics Championships medalists in swimming (men)
