= Christian Hein =

German swimmer

Personal information
- Full name: Christian Hein
- National team: Germany
- Born: 6 September 1982 (age 44) Würzburg, Bayern, West Germany
- Height: 1.83 m (6 ft 0 in)
- Weight: 78 kg (172 lb)

Sport
- Sport: Swimming
- Strokes: Freestyle, Open water
- Club: SVW 05 Würzburg
- Coach: Nikolai Evseev
Medal record
Men's swimming
Representing Germany
World Championships
Silver medal – second place	2003 Barcelona	5 km open water
Silver medal – second place	2003 Barcelona	10 km open water
European Championships
Silver medal – second place	2006 Budapest	5 km open water
Bronze medal – third place	2006 Budapest	10 km open water

Christian Hein (born 6 September 1982) is a German former swimmer who specialized in long-distance freestyle events and open water marathon. He won two silver medals in both 5 and 10 km open water swimming at the 2003 FINA World Championships in Barcelona, Spain, with a time of 53.13.9 and 1:51.06.5, respectively. Hein is a member of SVW 05 Würzburg, and is coached and trained by Nikolai Evseev.

Hein qualified for the men's 400 m freestyle at the 2004 Summer Olympics in Athens, by finishing second behind his teammate Heiko Hell from the Olympic trials, in an A-standard entry time of 3:51.53. Hein missed out a spot for the eight-man final, as he placed tenth out of 47 swimmers in the morning's preliminary heats, lowering his entry time to 3:49.66. In the 1500 m freestyle, Hein finished twelfth overall on the morning's preliminaries by exactly one second ahead of Japan's Takeshi Matsuda with a time of 15:15.42.

At the 2006 European Aquatics Championships in Budapest, Hungary, Hein swept the two spots for Germany, as he placed second behind Thomas Lurz by a single second margin in the men's 5 km open water race, clocking at 56:01.1. He also picked up a bronze medal in the 10 km race, but finished behind Maarten van der Weijden of the Netherlands by approximately three seconds, in a time of 1:58:16.6.
