= Neil Agius =

Maltese swimmer (born 1986)

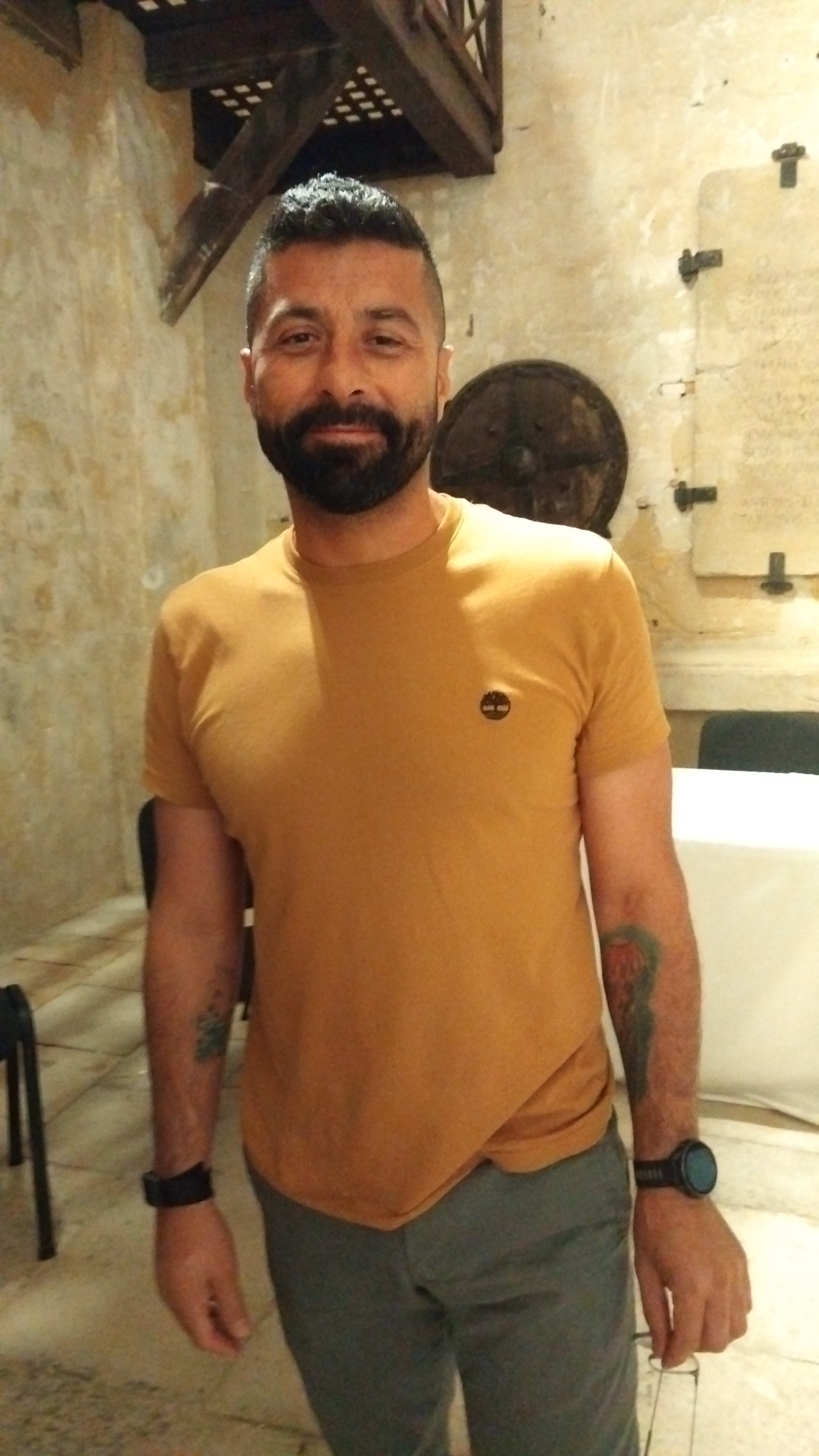
- Agius at Fort Ricasoli

Personal information
- Full name: Neil Agius
- National team: Malta
- Born: 6 June 1986 (age 40)
- Height: 1.68 m (5 ft 6 in)
- Weight: 65 kg (143 lb)

Sport
- Sport: Swimming
- Strokes: Freestyle
- Coach: Dave Haller

Neil Agius (born 6 June 1986) is a Maltese swimmer, former Olympian and world-record holder who specializes in long-distance freestyle events.

== Career ==
Agius qualified for the men's 400 m freestyle at the 2004 Summer Olympics in Athens, by receiving a Universality place from FINA. He broke a Maltese record and posted his entry time of 4:21.24 from the Easter International Swim Meet in Msida. As part of his preparations for the Games, Agius attended a 6-week training camp under the guidance of Dave Heller, who coached for the Cardiff Swimming Club. On the first day of the Games, Agius placed forty-sixth from the morning's prelims. Swimming in heat one, he rounded out a field of seven swimmers to last place with a slowest time of 4:22.14, less than a tenth of a second off his record.

Neil held three Maltese records each in the 400, 800, and 1500 m freestyle until one of them was broken by Edward Caruana Dingli in 2011.

In August 2021, he was honoured with the creation of a 266 kg bronze statue in his likeness, by artist Austin Camilleri.

== Marathon swimming ==
Outside of his Olympic career, Agius promotes awareness for environmental issues via marathon swims. In 2018 he swam 70 km around Malta in 22 hours raising awareness for marine plastic. The following year he swam around Gozo in ten hours, supporting the same cause.

In 2020, Agius became the second person to ever swim from Sicily to Malta. He accomplished the feat in a record-breaking time of 28:27:27.

On 30 June 2021, Agius might have established the new world record for the longest continuous unassisted open water swim - swimming 125.7 km from Linosa to Xlendi - from a small islet off Sicily to Gozo, Malta. This is still under review by the Marathon Swimmers Federation. In September 2024, Agius broke his own record with a 140km non-stop swim, a new world record.
