= Marcos Rivera =

Spanish swimmer

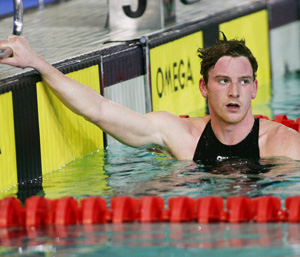

Personal information
- Full name: Marcos Rivera Miranda
- Nationality: Spanish
- Born: 20 April 1983 (age 43) Palma de Mallorca, Spain

Sport
- Sport: Swimming
Medal record
Representing Spain
Mediterranean Games
Bronze medal – third place	2009 Pescara	1500m freestyle

Marco Rivera Miranda (Note: In this Spanish name, the first or paternal surname is Rivera and the second or maternal family name is Miranda.) (born 20 April 1983 in Palma de Mallorca) is a Spanish former freestyle swimmer who competed in the 2004 Summer Olympics and in the 2008 Summer Olympics.
