= Luka Turk =

Slovenian swimmer

Personal information
- Full name: Luka Turk
- National team: Slovenia
- Born: 9 September 1986 (age 39) Radovljica, SR Slovenia, SFR Yugoslavia
- Height: 1.80 m (5 ft 11 in)
- Weight: 77 kg (170 lb)

Sport
- Sport: Swimming
- Strokes: Freestyle
- Club: PK Radovljica
- Coach: Miha Potocnik

Luka Turk (born September 9, 1986) is a Slovenian swimmer who specialized in freestyle events. He has set numerous national records for the freestyle events (200 m, 400 m, and 1500 m), including two at the 2007 Slovenian Open Championships. Turk was scheduled to compete for the men's 400 m freestyle at the 2008 Summer Olympics in Beijing, but withdrew from the games because of a knee injury.
