= Yury Prilukov =

Russian swimmer

Personal information
- Full name: Yury Aleksandrovich Prilukov
- Nationality: Russia
- Born: 14 June 1984 (age 42) Sverdlovsk, Sverdlovsk, Russian SFSR, Soviet Union
- Height: 1.88 m (6 ft 2 in)
- Weight: 80 kg (176 lb)

Sport
- Sport: Swimming
- Strokes: Freestyle
- Club: Yunost, Yekaterinburg
Medal record
Men's swimming
Representing Russia
World Championships (LC)
Silver medal – second place	2005 Montreal	400 m freestyle
Silver medal – second place	2007 Melbourne	1500 m freestyle
Bronze medal – third place	2005 Montreal	800 m freestyle
Bronze medal – third place	2007 Melbourne	400 m freestyle
World Championships (SC)
Gold medal – first place	2004 Indianapolis	400 m freestyle
Gold medal – first place	2004 Indianapolis	1500 m freestyle
Gold medal – first place	2006 Shanghai	400 m freestyle
Gold medal – first place	2006 Shanghai	1500 m freestyle
Gold medal – first place	2008 Manchester	400 m freestyle
Gold medal – first place	2008 Manchester	1500 m freestyle
Silver medal – second place	2002 Moscow	4×200 m freestyle
European Championships (LC)
Gold medal – first place	2002 Berlin	1500 m freestyle
Gold medal – first place	2004 Madrid	1500 m freestyle
Gold medal – first place	2006 Budapest	400 m freestyle
Gold medal – first place	2006 Budapest	1500 m freestyle
Gold medal – first place	2008 Eindhoven	400 m freestyle
Gold medal – first place	2008 Eindhoven	1500 m freestyle
Silver medal – second place	2004 Madrid	400 m freestyle
Silver medal – second place	2004 Madrid	4×200 m freestyle
Silver medal – second place	2008 Eindhoven	4×200 m freestyle
European Championships (SC)
Gold medal – first place	2002 Riesa	1500 m freestyle
Gold medal – first place	2003 Dublin	400 m freestyle
Gold medal – first place	2003 Dublin	1500 m freestyle
Gold medal – first place	2004 Vienna	1500 m freestyle
Gold medal – first place	2005 Trieste	400 m freestyle
Gold medal – first place	2005 Trieste	1500 m freestyle
Gold medal – first place	2006 Helsinki	400 m freestyle
Gold medal – first place	2006 Helsinki	1500 m freestyle
Silver medal – second place	2002 Riesa	400 m freestyle
Silver medal – second place	2004 Vienna	400 m freestyle
Summer Universiade
Gold medal – first place	2003 Daegu	400 m freestyle
Gold medal – first place	2003 Daegu	800 m freestyle
Gold medal – first place	2003 Daegu	1500 m freestyle
Gold medal – first place	2003 Daegu	4×200 m freestyle
Gold medal – first place	2005 Izmir	200 m freestyle
Gold medal – first place	2005 Izmir	400 m freestyle
Silver medal – second place	2005 Izmir	800 m freestyle

Yury Aleksandrovich Prilukov (Russian: Юрий Александрович Прилуков; born 14 June 1984) is a freestyle swimmer from Russia, who specializes in long distance swimming.

Prilukov was born in Sverdlovsk. He is a five-time European champion (long course), eight-time European champion (short course) and five-time World Short Course Champion and has also set three European records. At the 2004 Summer Olympics Prilukov finished sixth in the 400 meters freestyle and fourth in the 1500 metres freestyle. At the 2008 Summer Olympics he finished seventh in the 400 m freestyle and fourth once again in the 1500 m freestyle.
