= Sébastien Rouault =

French swimmer (born 1986)

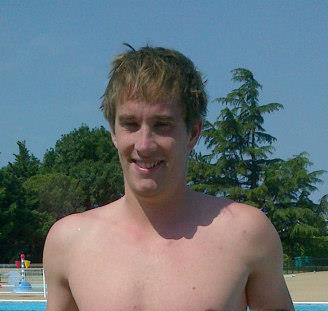
- Sébastien Rouault

Personal information
- Full name: Sébastien Rouault
- National team: France
- Born: 24 February 1986 (age 40) Le Chesnay, Yvelines
- Height: 1.82 m (6 ft 0 in)
- Weight: 75 kg (165 lb)

Sport
- Sport: Swimming
- Strokes: Freestyle
- Club: CNO ST Germain en Laye
- College team: University of Georgia (U.S.)
Medal record
Men's swimming
Representing France
World Championships (LC)
Silver medal – second place	2011 Shanghai	4×200 m freestyle
European Championships (LC)
Gold medal – first place	2010 Budapest	800 m freestyle
Gold medal – first place	2010 Budapest	1500 m freestyle
Silver medal – second place	2006 Budapest	1500 m freestyle
European Championships (SC)
Bronze medal – third place	2006 Helsinki	1500 m freestyle
Mediterranean Games
Gold medal – first place	2005 Almería	1500 m freestyle
Silver medal – second place	2005 Almería	800 m freestyle
Bronze medal – third place	2005 Almería	400 m freestyle

Sébastien Rouault (born 24 February 1986) is a male freestyle swimmer from France, who competed for his native country at the 2008 Summer Olympics in Beijing, China.

== See also ==
- List of University of Georgia people
