= Dragoș Coman =

Romanian swimmer

Dragoş Coman
Personal information
- Full name: Dragoş Cristian Coman
- Nationality: Romania
- Born: 16 October 1980 (age 45) București
- Height: 1.83 m (6 ft 0 in)
- Weight: 74 kg (163 lb)

Sport
- Sport: Swimming
- Strokes: Freestyle
Medal record
World Championships (LC)
Bronze medal – third place	2003 Barcelona	400 m freestyle
World Championships (SC)
Bronze medal – third place	2004 Indianapolis	1500 m freestyle
European Championships (LC)
Silver medal – second place	1999 Istanbul	1500 m freestyle
Silver medal – second place	2000 Helsinki	400 m freestyle
Bronze medal – third place	1999 Istanbul	400 m freestyle
Bronze medal – third place	2000 Helsinki	1500 m freestyle
Bronze medal – third place	2002 Berlin	400 m freestyle
Bronze medal – third place	2004 Madrid	400 m freestyle
Bronze medal – third place	2004 Madrid	1500 m freestyle
Bronze medal – third place	2008 Eindhoven	800 m freestyle
Summer Universiade
Gold medal – first place	2007 Bangkok	400 m freestyle
Silver medal – second place	2001 Beijing	400 m freestyle
Bronze medal – third place	2003 Daegu	400 m freestyle

Dragoş Coman (born 16 October 1980 in Bucharest) is an international freestyle swimmer from Romania, who represented his native country at three consecutive Summer Olympics, starting in 2000 in Sydney, Australia.

A year earlier, at the European LC Championships 1999 in Istanbul, he won his first medal: a silver one at the 1500 m freestyle. He also won the bronze medal at the 2003 World Championships in Barcelona, in the 400 m freestyle, only being surpassed by Thorpe and Hackett. He is Romania's top swimmer in the 400 and 1500 m freestyle races, winning European Junior gold medals, and several medals in European and world championships. Also he is titleholder in both 400 and 1500 m freestyle, at the World Military Games, winning medals at every edition.
