= Nicolas Rostoucher =

French swimmer

Personal information
- Nationality: France
- Born: 15 February 1981 (age 45) Colmar, Haut-Rhin, France
- Height: 1.87 m (6 ft 2 in)

Sport
- Sport: Swimming
- Strokes: Freestyle, individual medley
Medal record
European Championships (LC)
| Bronze medal – third place | 2002 Berlin | 400 m medley |
| Bronze medal – third place | 2004 Madrid | 4×200 m freestyle |
| Bronze medal – third place | 2006 Budapest | 400 m freestyle |
| Bronze medal – third place | 2006 Budapest | 1500 m freestyle |
European Championships (SC)
| Bronze medal – third place | 2001 Antwerp | 1500 m freestyle |
Mediterranean Games
| Gold medal – first place | 2001 Tunis | 400 m medley |
| Silver medal – second place | 2005 Almería | 400 m medley |

Nicolas Rostoucher (born 15 February 1981 in Colmar, Haut-Rhin) is a freestyle and medley swimmer from France who has been on the French National Swimming Team since 2000. He has competed for his native country at three consecutive Summer Olympics, starting in 2000. In 2001, he won his first international medal at the Mediterranean Games in Tunis: gold in the 400 m individual medley.
