= Swimming at the 2001 World Aquatics Championships – Men's 1500 metre freestyle =

Men's 1500 metre freestyle at the 2001 FINA World Championships
- Dates: 29 July 2001
- Competitors: 26 from 20 nations
- Winning time: 14:34.56 WR

Medalists
gold medal	Grant Hackett	Australia
silver medal	Graeme Smith	Great Britain
bronze medal	Alexei Filipets	Russia

The men's 1500 metre freestyle event at the 2001 World Aquatics Championships took place 29 July. The heats took place 28 July, while the final was held on 29 July.

In the final, Australian swimmer Grant Hackett broke the world record with a time of 14:34.56, bettering the previous record held by his compatriot Kieren Perkins by seven seconds. This record would stand for a decade until Chinese swimmer Sun Yang broke it at the 2011 World Aquatics Championships and at the time, it was the oldest world record in swimming.

== Records ==
Prior to the competition, the existing world and championship records were as follows:

World record	Kieren Perkins (AUS)	14:41.66	Victoria, Canada	24 August 1994
Championship record	Jörg Hoffmann (GER)	14:50.36	Perth, Australia	13 January 1991

The following record was established during the competition:

Date	Round	Name	Nation	Time	Record
22 July	Final	Grant Hackett	Australia	14:34.56	WR

== Results ==
=== Heats ===
Rank	Swimmer	Nation	Time	Notes
1	Grant Hackett	Australia	15:07.19	Q
2	Graeme Smith	United Kingdom	15:09.57	Q
3	Craig Stevens	Australia	15:14.62	Q
4	Ihor Chervynskyi	Ukraine	15:14.74	Q
5	Chris Thompson	United States	15:14.77	Q
6	Alexei Filipets	Russia	15:17.24	Q
7	Massimiliano Rosolino	Italy	15:17.74	Q
8	Nicolas Rostoucher	France	15:18.70	Q
9	Spyridon Gianniotis	Greece	15:20.62	
10	Ricardo Monasterio	Venezuela	15:20.73	
11	Alexei Boutsenine	Russia	15:21.21	
12	Masato Hirano	Japan	15:28.82	
13	Dragoș Coman	Romania	15:29.70	
14	Shunichi Fujita	Japan	15:31.92	
15	Shilo Ayalon	Israel	15:38.59	
16	Andrea Righi	Italy	15:40.56	
17	Andrew Hurd	Canada	15:40.61	
18	Robert Margalis	United States	15:49.94	
19	Jorge Carral	Mexico	16:00.51	
20	Giancarlo Zolezzi	Chile	16:01.58	
21	Dieung Manggang	Malaysia	16:05.74	
22	Leonardo Salinas	Mexico	16:13.93	
23	Yu Nam-Jeong	South Korea	16:23.76	
24	Mohammad Naeem Masri	Syria	16:56.37	
25	Hsu Kuo-Tung	Chinese Taipei	17:06.43	
26	Rony Bakale	Republic of the Congo	18:03.67	
–	Heiko Hell	Germany	DNS	

=== Final ===
Rank	Name	Nationality	Time	Notes
1st place, gold medalist(s)	Grant Hackett	Australia	14:34.56	WR
2nd place, silver medalist(s)	Graeme Smith	United Kingdom	14:58.94	
3rd place, bronze medalist(s)	Alexey Filipets	Russia	15:01.43	
4	Ihor Chevrynskyi	Ukraine	15:06.13	
5	Chris Thompson	United States	15:07.67	
6	Massimiliano Rosolino	Italy	15:10.54	
7	Craig Stevens	Australia	15:15.02	
8	Nicolas Rostoucher	France	15:18.89	

Key: WR = World record
