= Swimming at the 2001 World Aquatics Championships – Men's 800 metre freestyle =

Men's 800 metre freestyle at the 2001 FINA World Championships
- Dates: 24 July 2001
- Competitors: 25
- Winning time: 7:39.16 WR

Medalists
gold medal	Ian Thorpe	Australia
silver medal	Grant Hackett	Australia
bronze medal	Graeme Smith	Great Britain

The men's 800 metre freestyle event at the 2001 World Aquatics Championships took place 24 July. The heats took place 23 July, and the final was held on 24 July.

== Records ==
Prior to the competition, the existing world and championship records were as follows:

World record	Ian Thorpe (AUS)	7:41.59	Hobart, Australia	26 March 2001
Championship record	New event			

The following record was established during the competition:

Date	Round	Name	Nation	Time	Record
23 July 2001	Heat 4	Ian Thorpe	Australia	7:52.74	CR
24 July 2001	Final	Ian Thorpe	Australia	7:39.16	WR

== Results ==
=== Heats ===
Rank	Swimmer	Nation	Time	Notes
1	Ian Thorpe	Australia	7:52.74	Q, CR
2	Grant Hackett	Australia	7:54.22	Q
3	Graeme Smith	United Kingdom	7:56.73	Q
4	Alexey Filipets	Russia	7:56.89	Q
5	Chris Thompson	United States	7:57.11	Q
6	Shunichi Fujita	Japan	7:57.99	Q
7	Andrea Righi	Italy	8:00.46	Q
8	Heiko Hell	Germany	8:00.55	Q
9	Christian Minotti	Italy	8:00.70	
10	Adam Faulkner	United Kingdom	8:01.15	
11	Dragoș Coman	Romania	8:01.20	
12	Ihor Chervynskyy	Ukraine	8:01.52	
13	Masato Hirano	Japan	8:01.69	
14	Ricardo Monasterio	Venezuela	8:02.19	
15	Robert Margalis	United States	8:02.39	
16	Alexei Boutsenine	Russia	8:02.63	
17	Nicolas Rostoucher	France	8:02.92	
18	Spyridon Gianniotis	Greece	8:07.53	
19	Andrew Hurd	Canada	8:10.56	
20	Shilo Ayalon	Israel	8:13.49	
21	Zheng Shibin	China	8:16.57	
22	Leonardo Salinas	Mexico	8:22.63	
23	Giancarlo Zolezzi	Chile	8:22.79	
24	Jorge Carral	Mexico	8:23.28	
25	Hsu Kuo-Tung	Chinese Taipei	8:58.48	

=== Final ===
Rank	Name	Nationality	Time	Notes
1st place, gold medalist(s)	Ian Thorpe	Australia	7:39.16	WR
2nd place, silver medalist(s)	Grant Hackett	Australia	7:40.34	
3rd place, bronze medalist(s)	Graeme Smith	United Kingdom	7:51.12	
4	Chris Thompson	United States	7:53.95	
5	Alexey Filipets	Russia	7:56.30	
6	Andrea Righi	Italy	7:57.69	
7	Heiko Hell	Germany	7:59.47	
8	Shunichi Fujita	Japan	7:59.57	

Key: WR = World record
