= 1999 Pan Pacific Swimming Championships – Men's 1500 metre freestyle =

Men's 1500 metre freestyle at the 1999 Pan Pacific Swimming Championships
- Venue: Sydney International Aquatic Centre
- Dates: August 28, 1999 (heats); August 29, 1999 (final)
- Competitors: 14 from 6 nations
- Winning time: 14:45.60

Medalists
gold medal	Grant Hackett	Australia
silver medal	Ryk Neethling	South Africa
bronze medal	Chris Thompson	United States

The men's 1500 metre freestyle competition at the 1999 Pan Pacific Swimming Championships took place on August 28–29 at the Sydney International Aquatic Centre. The last champion was Grant Hackett of Australia.

== Records ==
Prior to this competition, the existing world and Pan Pacific records were as follows:

World record	Kieren Perkins (AUS)	14:41.66	Victoria, Canada	August 24, 1994
Pan Pacific Championships record	Kieren Perkins (AUS)	14:55.92	Kobe, Japan	August 15, 1993

== Results ==
All times are in minutes and seconds.

KEY:	q	Fastest non-qualifiers	Q	Qualified	CR	Championships record	NR	National record	PB	Personal best	SB	Seasonal best

=== Heats ===
The first round was held on August 28.

Rank	Name	Nationality	Time	Notes
1	Chris Thompson	United States	15:11.52	Q
2	Grant Hackett	Australia	15:12.64	Q
3	Ryk Neethling	South Africa	15:22.85	Q
4	Craig Stevens	Australia	15:23.34	Q
5	Masato Hirano	Japan	15:24.39	Q
6	Kieren Perkins	Australia	15:28.43	
7	Jon Younghouse	United States	15:33.19	Q
8	Erik Vendt	United States	15:42.93	
9	Tim Peterson	Canada	15:44.59	Q
10	Andrew Hurd	Canada	15:57.27	Q
11	Mark Johnston	Canada	16:01.75	
12	Trent Steed	Australia	16:03.03	
13	Chuck Sayao	Canada	16:25.47	
14	Hsu Kuo-tung	Chinese Taipei	16:54.83	

=== Final ===
The final was held on August 29.

Rank	Lane	Nationality	Time	Notes
1st place, gold medalist(s)	Grant Hackett	Australia	14:45.60	CR
2nd place, silver medalist(s)	Ryk Neethling	South Africa	15:02.40	
3rd place, bronze medalist(s)	Chris Thompson	United States	15:04.68	
4	Craig Stevens	Australia	15:15.68	
5	Masato Hirano	Japan	15:15.79	
6	Jon Younghouse	United States	15:30.61	
7	Andrew Hurd	Canada	15:41.12	
8	Tim Peterson	Canada	15:42.08	
