= Swimming at the 2000 Summer Olympics – Men's 1500 metre freestyle =

Men's 1500 metre freestyle at the Games of the XXVII Olympiad
- Venue: Sydney International Aquatic Centre
- Date: September 22, 2000 (heats); September 23, 2000 (final)
- Competitors: 41 from 32 nations
- Winning time: 14:48.33

Medalists
1st place, gold medalist(s)		Grant Hackett	Australia
2nd place, silver medalist(s)		Kieren Perkins	Australia
3rd place, bronze medalist(s)		Chris Thompson	United States

The men's 1500 metre freestyle event at the 2000 Summer Olympics took place on 22–23 September at the Sydney International Aquatic Centre in Sydney, Australia.

Australia's Grant Hackett denied his teammate and sentimental favourite Kieren Perkins a third straight title in the event. Having suffered badly over the first six days of the Games, Hackett maintained a strong lead from start to finish, and touched the wall first to claim a gold in 14:48.33. Perkins fought off a challenge against his newest rival in the middle of the program's longest race, but ended up only with a silver in 14:53.59, handing the entire medal haul for the host nation with a 1–2 finish. U.S. swimmer Chris Thompson came up with a spectacular swim to take the bronze in an American record of 14:56.81, holding off a fast-closing Alexei Filipets of Russia (14:56.88) by seven hundredths of a second (0.07). For the first time in Olympic history, all three medalists finished the race under a 15-minute barrier.

South Africa's dark horse Ryk Neethling powered home with a fifth-place effort in a new national record of 15:00.48, while American Erik Vendt, who previously set a continental mark from the trials, faded shortly to sixth in a time of 15:08.61. Ukraine's Igor Chervynskiy (15:08.80) and Germany's Heiko Hell (15:19.87) rounded out the finale.

== Records ==
Prior to this competition, the existing world and Olympic records were as follows.

World record	Kieren Perkins (AUS)	14:41.66	Victoria, Canada	24 August 1994
Olympic record	Kieren Perkins (AUS)	14:43.48	Barcelona, Spain	31 July 1992

== Results ==
=== Heats ===
Rank	Heat	Lane	Name	Nationality	Time	Notes
1	4	4	Kieren Perkins	Australia	14:58.34	Q
2	5	4	Erik Vendt	United States	15:05.11	Q
3	6	4	Grant Hackett	Australia	15:07.50	Q
4	6	5	Ryk Neethling	South Africa	15:09.12	Q, AF
5	4	3	Alexei Filipets	Russia	15:10.94	Q
6	5	5	Chris Thompson	United States	15:11.21	Q
7	5	6	Heiko Hell	Germany	15:11.91	Q
8	4	5	Igor Chervynskiy	Ukraine	15:12.30	Q
9	6	6	Dragoș Coman	Romania	15:12.64	NR
10	6	2	Christian Minotti	Italy	15:12.72	
11	6	1	Nicolas Rostoucher	France	15:13.26	
12	4	2	Frederik Hviid	Spain	15:14.37	
13	5	2	Masato Hirano	Japan	15:14.43	AS
14	5	3	Igor Snitko	Ukraine	15:14.67	
15	3	5	Ricardo Monasterio	Venezuela	15:17.00	
16	6	8	Yota Arase	Japan	15:18.20	
17	6	7	Paul Palmer	Great Britain	15:21.09	
18	4	1	Luiz Lima	Brazil	15:23.15	
19	6	3	Emiliano Brembilla	Italy	15:27.65	
20	3	4	Dmitry Koptur	Belarus	15:29.62	
21	3	3	Spyridon Gianniotis	Greece	15:29.69	
22	4	7	Alexey Kovrigin	Russia	15:30.69	
23	4	6	Andrew Hurd	Canada	15:30.98	
24	5	8	Teo Edo	Spain	15:32.01	
25	5	1	Hannes Kalteis	Austria	15:32.90	
26	1	4	Vlastimil Burda	Czech Republic	15:33.25	NR
27	4	8	Tim Peterson	Canada	15:34.94	
28	3	8	Torwai Sethsothorn	Thailand	15:39.60	
29	5	7	Adam Faulkner	Great Britain	15:39.86	
30	3	1	Petar Stoychev	Bulgaria	15:42.76	
31	3	2	Jorge Carral Armella	Mexico	15:43.03	
32	3	7	Jin Hao	China	15:48.49	
33	3	6	Cho Sung-mo	South Korea	15:50.45	
34	2	3	Juan Carlos Piccio	Philippines	15:51.57	NR
35	2	6	Agustín Fiorilli	Argentina	15:52.69	
36	2	5	Dieung Manggang	Malaysia	16:02.11	
37	2	4	Jonathan Duncan	New Zealand	16:03.41	
38	2	7	Steven Chandra	Indonesia	16:10.98	
39	2	2	Diego Mularoni	San Marino	16:12.91	
40	1	5	Li Yun-lun	Chinese Taipei	16:13.05	
	1	3	Ivan Ivanov	Kyrgyzstan	DSQ	

=== Final ===
Rank	Lane	Name	Nationality	Time	Notes
1st place, gold medalist(s)	3	Grant Hackett	Australia	14:48.33	
2nd place, silver medalist(s)	4	Kieren Perkins	Australia	14:53.59	
3rd place, bronze medalist(s)	7	Chris Thompson	United States	14:56.81	AM
4	2	Alexei Filipets	Russia	14:56.88	NR
5	6	Ryk Neethling	South Africa	15:00.48	AF
6	5	Erik Vendt	United States	15:08.61	
7	8	Igor Chervynskiy	Ukraine	15:08.80	
8	1	Heiko Hell	Germany	15:19.87	
