= 2006 Pan Pacific Swimming Championships – Men's 1500 metre freestyle =

Men's 1500 metre freestyle at the 2006 Pan Pacific Swimming Championships
- Venue: Saanich Commonwealth Place
- Dates: August 20, 2006 (heats & finals)
- Competitors: 22 from 10 nations
- Winning time: 15:06.11

Medalists
gold medal	Park Tae-Hwan	South Korea
silver medal	Erik Vendt	United States
bronze medal	Takeshi Matsuda	Japan

The men's 1500 metre freestyle competition at the 2006 Pan Pacific Swimming Championships took place on August 20 at the Saanich Commonwealth Place. The last champion was Grant Hackett of Australia.

This event was a timed-final where each swimmer swam just once. The top 8 seeded swimmers swam in the evening, and the remaining swimmers swam in the morning session.

== Records ==
Prior to this competition, the existing world and Pan Pacific records were as follows:

World record	Grant Hackett (AUS)	14:34.56	Fukuoka, Japan	July 29, 2001
Pan Pacific Championships record	Grant Hackett (AUS)	14:41.65	Yokohama, Japan	August 28, 2002

== Results ==
All times are in minutes and seconds.

KEY:	q	Fastest non-qualifiers	Q	Qualified	CR	Championships record	NR	National record	PB	Personal best	SB	Seasonal best

The first round was held on August 20, at 11:21, and the final was held on August 20, at 20:05.

Rank	Heat	Lane	Name	Nationality	Time	Notes
1st place, gold medalist(s)	3	4	Park Tae-Hwan	South Korea	15:06.11	
2nd place, silver medalist(s)	3	5	Erik Vendt	United States	15:07.17	
3rd place, bronze medalist(s)	3	2	Takeshi Matsuda	Japan	15:08.97	
4	3	8	Ryan Cochrane	Canada	15:13.44	
5	3	7	Peter Vanderkaay	United States	15:16.89	
6	1	4	Robert Margalis	United States	15:19.11	
7	3	6	Troyden Prinsloo	South Africa	15:19.25	
8	1	5	Michael Klueh	United States	15:20.87	
9	3	3	Andrew Hurd	Canada	15:23.25	
10	3	1	Kenichi Doki	Japan	15:30.55	
11	1	8	Kang Yong-Hwan	South Korea	15:32.93	
12	1	1	Trent Grimsey	Australia	15:33.31	
13	2	4	Bryn Murphy	New Zealand	15:33.55	
14	1	6	Gen Ishimura	Japan	15:35.43	
15	2	1	Armando Negreiros	Brazil	15:38.66	
16	1	2	Cameron Smith	Australia	15:43.98	
17	2	5	Kier Maitland	Canada	15:46.91	
18	1	3	Kurtis MacGillivary	Australia	16:01.28	
19	2	3	He Xiaofeng	China	16:03.87	
20	2	6	Tang Sheng-Chieh	Chinese Taipei	16:06.77	
21	2	2	Matthew Pariselli	Canada	16:10.05	
22	2	7	Pan Kevin-Owen	Chinese Taipei	16:13.11	
-	1	7	Fran Crippen	United States	DSQ	
