= Swimming at the 2003 World Aquatics Championships – Men's 1500 metre freestyle =

Men's 1500m Freestyle at the 2003 FINA World Aquatics Championships
- Dates: 26 July (prelims); 27 July (final)
- Winning time: 14 minute 43.14 seconds

Medalists
gold medal	Grant Hackett	Australia
silver medal	Igor Chervynskyi	Ukraine
bronze medal	Erik Vendt	United States

The Men's 1500 metre Freestyle event at the 10th FINA World Aquatics Championships swam on July 26–27, 2003 in Barcelona, Spain. Preliminary heats swam in the morning session on July 26, with the top-8 finishers advancing to swim again in the Final during the evening session on July 27.

Prior to the start of the event, the existing World (WR) and Championship (CR) records were both:

- WR & CR: 14:34.56 swum by Grant Hackett (Australia) on July 29, 2001 in Fukuoka, Japan

== Results ==
=== Final ===
Place	Swimmer	Nation	Time	Notes
1	Grant Hackett	Australia	14:43.14	
2	Igor Chervynskyi	Ukraine	15:01.04	
3	Erik Vendt	USA	15:01.28	
4	David Davies	Great Britain	15:05.04	
5	Larsen Jensen	USA	15:08.25	
6	Graeme Smith	Great Britain	15:12.64	
7	Christian Minotti	Italy	15:13.28	
8	Paweł Korzeniowski	Poland	15:13.98	

=== Preliminaries ===
Rank	Heat+Lane	Swimmer	Nation	Time	Notes
1	H5 L4	Grant Hackett	Australia	15:08.79	q
2	H4 L3	Graeme Smith	Great Britain	15:12.74	q
3	H3 L4	Erik Vendt	United States	15:13.41	q
4	H3 L3	David Davies	Great Britain	15:13.93	q
5	H5 L3	Ihor Chervynskyi	Ukraine	15:14.01	q
6	H3 L5	Christian Minotti	Italy	15:14.84	q
7	H4 L4	Larsen Jensen	United States	15:15.63	q
8	H2 L4	Paweł Korzeniowski	Poland	15:16.07	q
9	H3 L2	Kurtis MacGillivary	Canada	15:17.02	
10	H4 L5	Yuri Prilukov	Russia	15:17.26	
11	H3 L6	Thomas Lurz	Germany	15:17.85	
12	H5 L1	Alexey Filipets	Russia	15:20.77	
13	H3 L8	Bojan Zdešar	Slovenia	15:22.31	
14	H5 L5	Craig Stevens	Australia	15:22.44	
15	H5 L2	Andrew Hurd	Canada	15:22.92	
16	H5 L8	Hannes Kalteis	Austria	15:24.77	
17	H3 L7	Spyridon Gianniotis	Greece	15:25.16	
18	H4 L2	Shilo Ayalon	Israel	15:26.86	
19	H5 L6	Dragoș Coman	Romania	15:33.04	
20	H5 L7	Dzmitry Koptur	Belarus	15:34.24	
21	H4 L1	Shunichi Fujita	Japan	15:36.56	
22	H4 L8	Lin Zhang	China	15:37.03	
23	H2 L3	Luiz Lima	Brazil	15:43.07	
24	H2 L5	Bruno Bonfim	Brazil	15:48.41	
25	H4 L7	Georgios Diamantidis	Greece	15:49.56	
26	H1 L3	Gian Carlo Zolezzi	Chile	15:55.89	
27	H4 L6	Cheng Yu	China	16:02.74	
28	H2 L2	Yi-Khy Saw	Malaysia	16:03.81	
29	H2 L6	Erwin Maldonado	Venezuela	16:04.08	
30	H1 L4	Mohammad Naeem Masri	Syria	16:18.28	
31	H2 L1	Raouf Benabid	Algeria	16:21.67	
32	H2 L7	Kwok Leung Chung	Hong Kong	16:24.39	
33	H2 L8	Roberto Peñailillo	Chile	16:36.02	
34	H1 L5	Jonathan Mauri	Costa Rica	16:53.32	
35	H1 L2	Rony Bakale	Republic of the Congo	17:11.08	
36	H1 L6	Ivan Grougnet	Andorra	17:35.25	
37	H1 L1	Steven Mangroo	Seychelles	17:35.84	
-	-	Nicolas Rostoucher	France	DNS	
-	-	Jean-Luc Razakarivony	Madagascar	DNS	
