= 2006 Pan Pacific Swimming Championships – Men's 400 metre freestyle =

Men's 400 metre freestyle at the 2006 Pan Pacific Swimming Championships
- Venue: Saanich Commonwealth Place
- Dates: August 19, 2006 (heats & finals)
- Competitors: 35 from 11 nations
- Winning time: 3:45.72

Medalists
gold medal	Park Tae-Hwan	South Korea
silver medal	Zhang Lin	China
bronze medal	Klete Keller	United States

The men's 400 metre freestyle competition at the 2006 Pan Pacific Swimming Championships took place on August 19 at the Saanich Commonwealth Place. The last champion was Ian Thorpe of Australia.

This race consisted of eight lengths of the pool, with all eight being in the freestyle stroke.

== Records ==
Prior to this competition, the existing world and Pan Pacific records were as follows:

World record	Ian Thorpe (AUS)	3:40.08	Manchester, Great Britain	July 30, 2002
Pan Pacific Championships record	Ian Thorpe (AUS)	3:41.83	Sydney, Australia	August 22, 1999

== Results ==
All times are in minutes and seconds.

KEY:	q	Fastest non-qualifiers	Q	Qualified	CR	Championships record	NR	National record	PB	Personal best	SB	Seasonal best

=== Heats ===
The first round was held on August 19, at 10:21.

Rank	Heat	Lane	Name	Nationality	Time	Notes
1	5	5	Park Tae-Hwan	South Korea	3:50.41	QA
2	5	7	Robert Margalis	United States	3:50.75	QA
3	5	4	Klete Keller	United States	3:50.92	QA
4	5	3	Andrew Hurd	Canada	3:51.20	QA
5	5	2	Erik Vendt	United States	3:51.56	QA
6	4	4	Peter Vanderkaay	United States	3:51.94	QA
7	3	2	Ryan Lochte	United States	3:52.33	QA
8	4	5	Zhang Lin	China	3:52.49	QA
9	4	6	Ryan Cochrane	Canada	3:52.63	QB
10	3	4	Takeshi Matsuda	Japan	3:52.80	QB
11	3	5	Michael Klueh	United States	3:52.88	QB
12	3	6	Troyden Prinsloo	South Africa	3:54.10	QB
13	4	3	Fran Crippen	United States	3:54.46	QB
14	2	4	Kang Yong-Hwan	South Korea	3:54.60	QB
15	3	8	Joshua Krogh	Australia	3:54.93	QB
16	4	8	Felipe May Araújo	Brazil	3:55.10	QB
17	2	5	Armando Negreiros	Brazil	3:55.24	
18	4	1	Kenichi Doki	Japan	3:56.02	
19	5	6	Hisato Matsumoto	Japan	3:56.15	
20	4	2	Xin Tong	China	3:56.21	
21	3	3	Nicholas Ffrost	Australia	3:56.77	
22	2	3	Raymond Betuzzi	Canada	3:58.24	
23	2	2	Bryn Murphy	New Zealand	3:58.58	
24	3	1	Yuji Sakurai	Japan	3:59.74	
25	3	7	Robert Voss	New Zealand	3:59.80	
26	5	8	Ty Hurst	Australia	4:00.19	
27	2	6	Tang Sheng-Chieh	Chinese Taipei	4:01.04	
28	5	1	Cameron Smith	Australia	4:02.76	
29	2	8	Michael Jack	New Zealand	4:03.19	
30	4	7	Kurtis MacGillivary	Australia	4:07.01	
31	2	1	Pascal Wollach	Canada	4:07.22	
32	1	4	Matthew Pariselli	Canada	4:07.81	
33	1	5	Benjamin Guzman	Chile	4:09.24	
34	1	3	Bogdan Knezevic	Canada	4:11.98	
35	2	7	Pan Kevin-Owen	Chinese Taipei	4:12.67	

=== B Final ===
The B final was held on August 19, at 18:18.

Rank	Lane	Name	Nationality	Time	Notes
9	4	Peter Vanderkaay	United States	3:49.42	
10	6	Armando Negreiros	Brazil	3:53.82	
11	7	Hisato Matsumoto	Japan	3:54.70	
12	5	Joshua Krogh	Australia	3:55.16	
13	1	Xin Tong	China	3:55.27	
14	2	Kenichi Doki	Japan	3:55.81	
15	8	Nicholas Ffrost	Australia	3:55.94	
16	3	Felipe May Araújo	Brazil	3:58.70	

=== A Final ===
The A final was held on August 19, at 18:18.

Rank	Lane	Name	Nationality	Time	Notes
1st place, gold medalist(s)	4	Park Tae-Hwan	South Korea	3:45.72	
2nd place, silver medalist(s)	2	Zhang Lin	China	3:47.07	
3rd place, bronze medalist(s)	3	Klete Keller	United States	3:47.17	
4	6	Andrew Hurd	Canada	3:49.32	
5	5	Robert Margalis	United States	3:49.67	
6	1	Takeshi Matsuda	Japan	3:50.96	
7	7	Ryan Cochrane	Canada	3:53.70	
8	8	Kang Yong-Hwan	South Korea	3:54.05	
