= 2006 Pan Pacific Swimming Championships – Men's 800 metre freestyle =

Men's 800 metre freestyle at the 2006 Pan Pacific Swimming Championships
- Venue: Saanich Commonwealth Place; Saanich, British Columbia, Canada
- Dates: August 17, 2006 (heats & finals)
- Competitors: 18 from 8 nations
- Winning time: 7:55.88

Medalists
gold medal	Andrew Hurd	Canada
silver medal	Troyden Prinsloo	South Africa
bronze medal	Ryan Cochrane	Canada

The men's 800 metre freestyle competition at the 2006 Pan Pacific Swimming Championships took place on August 17 at the Saanich Commonwealth Place. The last champion was Grant Hackett of Australia.

This event was a timed-final where each swimmer swam just once. The top 8 seeded swimmers swam in the evening, and the remaining swimmers swam in the morning session.

== Records ==
Prior to this competition, the existing world and Pan Pacific records were as follows:

World record	Grant Hackett (AUS)	7:38.65	Montreal, Quebec, Canada	July 27, 2005
Pan Pacific Championships record	Grant Hackett (AUS)	7:44.78	Yokohama, Japan	August 24, 2002

== Results ==
All times are in minutes and seconds.

KEY:	q	Fastest non-qualifiers	Q	Qualified	CR	Championships record	NR	National record	PB	Personal best	SB	Seasonal best

The first round was held on August 17, at 11:30, and the final was held on August 17, at 18:15.

Rank	Heat	Lane	Name	Nationality	Time	Notes
1st place, gold medalist(s)	3	5	Andrew Hurd	Canada	7:55.88	
2nd place, silver medalist(s)	3	4	Troyden Prinsloo	South Africa	7:56.82	
3rd place, bronze medalist(s)	3	7	Ryan Cochrane	Canada	7:58.32	
4	3	8	Kenichi Doki	Japan	8:02.15	
5	3	1	Chip Peterson	United States	8:05.07	
6	3	3	Fran Crippen	United States	8:06.32	
7	1	6	Felipe May Araújo	Brazil	8:07.13	
8	3	6	Cameron Smith	Australia	8:08.15	
9	1	1	Armando Negreiros	Brazil	8:09.27	
10	1	7	Bryn Murphy	New Zealand	8:11.52	
11	1	5	Gen Ishimura	Japan	8:12.31	
12	1	3	Ky Hurst	Australia	8:13.50	
13	3	2	Trent Grimsey	Australia	8:14.82	
14	1	2	Kier Maitland	Canada	8:17.12	
15	2	4	Tang Sheng-Chieh	Chinese Taipei	8:22.34	
16	2	5	David Browne	Australia	8:25.46	
17	1	4	Kurtis MacGillivary	Australia	8:26.86	
18	2	3	Matthew Pariselli	Canada	8:31.01	
