= Swimming at the 1998 Commonwealth Games – Men's 1500 metre freestyle =

Men's 1500 metre freestyle at the 1998 Commonwealth Games
- Venue: KL Sports City
- Competitors: 13 from 9 nations
- Winning time: 14:50.92

Medalists
gold medal	Grant Hackett	Australia
silver medal	Ryk Neethling	South Africa
bronze medal	Kieren Perkins	Australia

The men's 1500 metre freestyle event at the 1998 Commonwealth Games was held at KL Sports City.

== Records ==
Prior to this competition, the existing world, Commonwealth and Games records were as follows:

World record	Kieren Perkins (AUS)	14:41.66	Victoria, Canada	24 August 1994
Commonwealth record	Kieren Perkins (AUS)	14:41.66	Victoria, Canada	24 August 1994
Games record	Kieren Perkins (AUS)	14:41.66	Victoria, Canada	24 August 1994

== Results ==
=== Heats ===
Rank	Name	Nationality	Time	Notes
1	Grant Hackett	Australia	15:19.63	Q
2	Graeme Smith	Scotland	15:20.32	Q
3	Ian Wilson	England	15:34.27	Q
4	Kieren Perkins	Australia	15:34.75	Q
5	Daniel Kowalski	Australia	15:43.39	Q
6	Ryk Neethling	South Africa	15:45.94	Q
7	Tim Peterson	Canada	15:51.65	Q
8	Brent Sallee	Canada	15:54.78	Q
9	Dieung Manggang	Malaysia	16:02.45	
10	Michael McWha	Canada	16:06.27	
11	Mark Chay	Singapore	16:41.60	
12	Neil Cameron	Northern Ireland	16:44.39	
13	Cliff Gittens	Barbados	17:03.01	

=== Final ===
Rank	Lane	Name	Nationality	Time	Notes
1st place, gold medalist(s)	4	Grant Hackett	Australia	14:50.92	
2nd place, silver medalist(s)	7	Ryk Neethling	South Africa	15:02.88	
3rd place, bronze medalist(s)	6	Kieren Perkins	Australia	15:03.00	
4	2	Daniel Kowalski	Australia	15:03.40	
5	5	Graeme Smith	Scotland	15:23.42	
6	3	Ian Wilson	England	15:29.83	
7	8	Brent Sallee	Canada	15:42.85	
8	1	Tim Peterson	Canada	15:56.56	
