= Swimming at the 2003 World Aquatics Championships – Men's 800 metre freestyle =

Men's 800m Freestyle at the 2003 FINA World Aquatics Championships
- Dates: 24 July (prelims); 25 July (final)
- Winning time: 7 minute 43.82 seconds

Medalists
gold medal	Grant Hackett	Australia
silver medal	Larsen Jensen	United States
bronze medal	Ihor Chervynskyi	Ukraine

The Men's 800 Freestyle event at the 10th FINA World Aquatics Championships swam on July 24–25, 2003 in Barcelona, Spain. Preliminary heats of the event were swum during the morning session on July 24, with the Final being held during the evening session on July 25.

Prior to the start of the event, the existing World (WR) and Championship (CR) records were both:

- WR & CR: 7:39.16 swum by Ian Thorpe (Australia) on July 24, 2001, in Fukuoka, Japan

== Results ==
=== Final ===
Place	Swimmer	Nation	Time	Notes
1	Grant Hackett	Australia	7:43.82	
2	Larsen Jensen	USA	7:48.09	NR
3	Ihor Chervynskyi	Ukraine	7:53.15	
4	Graeme Smith	Great Britain	7:53.48	
5	Dragoș Coman	Romania	7:57.22	
6	Kurtis MacGillivary	Canada	8:01.75	
7	Shunichi Fujita	Japan	8:02.38	
8	Lin Zhang	China	8:04.10	

=== Preliminaries ===
Rank	Heat+Lane	Swimmer	Nation	Time	Notes
1	H4 L4	Grant Hackett	Australia	7:55.15	q
2	H2 L4	Graeme Smith	Great Britain	7:58.66	q
3	H3 L4	Larsen Jensen	United States	7:59.18	q
4	H4 L3	Kurtis MacGillivary	Canada	7:59.58	q
5	H2 L3	Dragoș Coman	Romania	8:00.44	q
6	H3 L2	Ihor Chervynskyi	Ukraine	8:00.61	q
7	H2 L2	Shunichi Fujita	Japan	8:02.84	q
8	H3 L1	Lin Zhang	China	8:04.74	q
9	H3 L5	Stephen Penfold	Australia	8:06.48	
10	H3 L7	Shilo Ayalon	Israel	8:07.85	
11	H2 L1	Hannes Kalteis	Austria	8:08.17	
12	H4 L7	Chad Carvin	United States	8:08.48	
13	H2 L6	Dimitros Manganas	Greece	8:10.07	
14	H2 L7	Felipe Araujo	Brazil	8:10.56	
15	H3 L6	Kyu Chul Han	South Korea	8:13.47	
16	H4 L8	Gian Carlo Zolezzi	Chile	8:14.62	
17	H4 L1	Luiz Lima	Brazil	8:15.08	
18	H4 L2	Cheng Yu	China	8:16.23	
19	H3 L3	Rick Say	Canada	8:17.31	
20	H3 L8	Yi-Khy Saw	Malaysia	8:22.99	
21	H2 L8	Shai Livant	Israel	8:24.14	
22	H1 L4	Mohammad Naeem Masri	Syria	8:30.00	
23	H1 L3	Kwok Leung Chung	Hong Kong	8:31.10	
24	H1 L5	Roberto Peñailillo	Chile	8:34.10	
25	H1 L6	Neils Agius	Malta	9:09.73	
26	H1 L2	Steven Mangroo	Seychelles	9:16.60	
27	H1 L7	Barnsley Albert	Seychelles	9:27.30	
-	-	David Davies	Great Britain	DNS	
-	-	Emiliano Brembilla	Italy	DNS	
-	-	Trevor Kakunze	Burundi	DNS	
