= Steven Chandra =

Indonesian swimmer (born 1981)

Personal information
- Full name: Steven Chandra
- National team: Indonesia
- Born: 9 January 1981 (age 45)
- Height: 1.79 m (5 ft 10 in)
- Weight: 59 kg (130 lb)

Sport
- Sport: Swimming
- Strokes: Freestyle
Medal record
Men's swimming
Representing Indonesia
Southeast Asian Games
Bronze medal – third place	1999 Brunei	1500 m freestyle

Steven Chandra (born January 9, 1981) is an Indonesian former swimmer, who specialized in long-distance freestyle events. He won a bronze medal in the 1500 m freestyle (16:02.63) at the 1999 Southeast Asian Games in Brunei, and later represented Indonesia at the 2000 Summer Olympics.

Chandra competed in the men's 1500 m freestyle at the 2000 Summer Olympics in Sydney. After winning a bronze medal from the Southeast Asian Games, his entry time of 16:02.63 was accredited under a FINA B-standard. He challenged five other swimmers in heat two, including SEA Games silver medalist Carlo Piccio of the Philippines and defending champion Dieung Manggang of Malaysia. He came up short with his best swim in fifth place at 16:10.98, almost eight seconds off his entry time. Chandra failed to reach the top 8 final, as he placed thirty-eighth overall in the prelims.
