= Cho Sung-mo =

South Korean swimmer (born 1985)

Personal information
- Full name: Cho Sung-mo
- National team: South Korea
- Born: 6 January 1985 (age 41) Gyeonggi-do, South Korea
- Height: 1.74 m (5 ft 9 in)
- Weight: 72 kg (159 lb)

Korean name
- Hangul: 조성모
- Hanja: 趙成模
- RR: Jo Seongmo
- MR: Cho Sŏngmo

Sport
- Sport: Swimming
- Strokes: Freestyle
- Coach: Jack Simon (U.S.)
Medal record
Men's swimming
Representing South Korea
Asian Games
Silver medal – second place	2002 Busan	1500 m freestyle

Cho Sung-mo (Korean: 조성모; born January 6, 1985) is a South Korean former swimmer, who specialized in long-distance freestyle events. He established a South Korean record of 15:12.32 to earn a silver medal in the 1500 m freestyle at the 2002 Asian Games in Busan. During his swimming career, Cho has been training most of the time between the United States and Mexico, under veteran coach and long-time mentor Jack Simon.

Cho made his Olympic debut, as South Korea's youngest male swimmer (aged 15), at the 2000 Summer Olympics in Sydney. Swimming in heat three of the men's 1500 m freestyle, Cho faded down the stretch to round out the field in last place and thirty-third overall on the morning prelims in 15:50.45.

At the 2004 Summer Olympics in Athens, Cho qualified again for the men's 1500 m freestyle by posting a FINA B-standard entry time of 15:19.49 from the Summer Universiade in Daegu. He challenged seven other swimmers on the third heat, including top medal favorite David Davies of Great Britain. Cho rounded out the field to last place by a 13.38-second margin behind Russia's Alexey Filipets in 15:43.43. Cho failed to advance into the final, as he placed twenty-fifth overall in the preliminaries.
