= 2002 Pan Pacific Swimming Championships – Men's 1500 metre freestyle =

Men's 1500 metre freestyle at the 2002 Pan Pacific Swimming Championships
- Venue: Yokohama International Swimming Pool
- Dates: August 29, 2002 (heats & finals)
- Competitors: 8 from 5 nations
- Winning time: 14:41.65

Medalists
gold medal	Grant Hackett	Australia
silver medal	Erik Vendt	United States
bronze medal	Larsen Jensen	United States

The men's 1500 metre freestyle competition at the 2002 Pan Pacific Swimming Championships took place on August 29 at the Yokohama International Swimming Pool. The last champion was Grant Hackett of Australia.

This event was a timed-final where each swimmer swam just once.

== Records ==
Prior to this competition, the existing world and Pan Pacific records were as follows:

World record	Grant Hackett (AUS)	14:34.56	Fukuoka, Japan	July 29, 2001
Pan Pacific Championships record	Grant Hackett (AUS)	14:45.60	Sydney, Australia	August 29, 1999

== Results ==
All times are in minutes and seconds.

KEY:	q	Fastest non-qualifiers	Q	Qualified	CR	Championships record	NR	National record	PB	Personal best	SB	Seasonal best

Rank	Heat	Lane	Name	Nationality	Time	Notes
1st place, gold medalist(s)	2	4	Grant Hackett	Australia	14:41.65	CR
2nd place, silver medalist(s)	2	5	Erik Vendt	United States	15:02.24	
3rd place, bronze medalist(s)	2	3	Larsen Jensen	United States	15:05.17	
4	2	6	Craig Stevens	Australia	15:20.76	
5	2	2	Shunichi Fujita	Japan	15:21.19	
6	2	1	Kurtis MacGillivary	Canada	15:36.12	
7	2	8	Bruno Bonfim	Brazil	15:41.80	
8	2	7	Takeshi Matsuda	Japan	15:53.75	
-	1	4	Chris Thompson	United States	15:29.27	
-	1	5	Kwok Leung Chung	Hong Kong	16:02.83	
