= Heath O'Loughlin =

Australian journalist

Heath O'Loughlin is an Australian journalist.

He has previously been a weekend sports presenter and reporter for Nine News Melbourne.

== Career ==
At the end of 2006, O'Loughlin moved from the Seven Network to the Nine Network to replace Leith Mulligan as weekend sport presenter, with Mulligan moving to Fox Sports News. O'Loughlin presented alongside news presenter Jo Hall and filled-in for the weeknight sports presenter Tony Jones.

O'Loughlin previously worked for Seven News as a reporter. He started work with the Seven Network in production roles behind the scenes and after learning how the industry worked off-camera, O'Loughlin pursued a journalism cadetship with the newsroom. After completing his cadetship and six years of reporting general news for the network.

As an athlete Heath was a member of the national volleyball team and was headed to the Olympics, but left the team to pursue his career in journalism. He plays basketball, Australian rules football and boxing.

O'Loughlin finished at Nine News when his contract ended in November 2008. He was replaced by Grant Hackett. He subsequently worked for the North Melbourne Football Club.

Preceded by Leith Mulligan	Nine News Melbourne weekend sport presenter December 2006 – October 2008	Succeeded by Grant Hackett
