= 1997 Pan Pacific Swimming Championships – Men's 1500 metre freestyle =

Men's 1500 metre freestyle at the 1997 Pan Pacific Swimming Championships
- Venue: NISHI Civic Pool
- Dates: August 13, 1997 (heats & finals)
- Competitors: 8 from 5 nations
- Winning time: 15:13.25

Medalists
gold medal	Grant Hackett	Australia
silver medal	Tyler Painter	United States
bronze medal	Chad Carvin	United States

The men's 1500 metre freestyle competition at the 1997 Pan Pacific Swimming Championships took place on August 13 at the NISHI Civic Pool. The last champion was Kieren Perkins of Australia.

This event was a timed-final where each swimmer swam just once.

== Records ==
Prior to this competition, the existing world and Pan Pacific records were as follows:

World record	Kieren Perkins (AUS)	14:41.66	Victoria, Canada	August 24, 1994
Pan Pacific Championships record	Kieren Perkins (AUS)	14:55.92	Kobe, Japan	August 15, 1993

== Results ==
All times are in minutes and seconds.

KEY:	q	Fastest non-qualifiers	Q	Qualified	CR	Championships record	NR	National record	PB	Personal best	SB	Seasonal best

Rank	Name	Nationality	Time	Notes
1st place, gold medalist(s)	Grant Hackett	Australia	15:13.25	
2nd place, silver medalist(s)	Tyler Painter	United States	15:17.01	
3rd place, bronze medalist(s)	Chad Carvin	United States	15:17.18	
4	Hisato Yasui	Japan	15:34.93	
5	Torlarp Sethsothorn	Thailand	15:38.45	
6	Michael McWha	Canada	15:40.20	
7	Masato Hirano	Japan	15:40.88	
8	Brent Sallee	Canada	15:42.20	
