= Tim Peterson (swimmer) =

Canadian swimmer (born 1978)

Personal information
- Born: December 26, 1978 (age 47) Vancouver, British Columbia, Canada
- Height: 1.80 m (5 ft 11 in)
- Weight: 70 kg (154 lb)

Sport
- Country: Canada
- Sport: Swimming
- Strokes: Freestyle
- Club: Pacific Dolphins
- College team: University of British Columbia

Tim Peterson (born December 26, 1978) is a Canadian retired swimmer who specialized in long-distance freestyle events. He was a member of the Canadian Olympic team in 2000, and was also a member of the Canadian squad at the 1998 Commonwealth Games in Kuala Lumpur, Malaysia.

Peterson competed in the men's 1500-metre freestyle at the 2000 Summer Olympics in Sydney. He eclipsed a FINA A-standard entry time of 15:26.05, after finishing second from the Canadian Olympic Trials in Winnipeg, Manitoba. He challenged seven other swimmers in heat four, including his 17-year-old teammate Andrew Hurd, and Australia's two-time Olympic champion Kieren Perkins. He rounded out the field to last place by almost four seconds behind Hurd in a time of 15:34.94. Peterson failed to reach the top-8 final, as he placed twenty-seventh overall on the last day of preliminaries.
