= Leith Mulligan =

Australian sports journalist

Leith Mulligan (born 1 July 1972 in South Australia) is an Australian sports journalist.

== Career ==
In 1989, aged 16, Mulligan joined Channel 8 in Mount Gambier as a junior sports reporter.

Over the next six years he worked at WIN TV in Shepparton and Wollongong. In 1995, Leith joined Ten News in Sydney as a sports reporter. Three years later in 1998 he joined National Nine News as a sports reporter. A year later Mulligan began presenting the weekend sports report on National Nine News in Melbourne, with Jo Hall. He also used to fill in for the weeknight sports presenter Tony Jones throughout the year.

In 2006, Leith left the Nine Network for Foxtel and was replaced by Seven News reporter Heath O'Loughlin.

In December 2008, Mulligan joined Seven News in Melbourne as a reporter and fill in sport presenter. He was sacked by the network in November 2012 after the bulletin lost every week of that year's ratings to the rival Nine News Melbourne.

== Personal life ==
Mulligan was born in South Australia and grew up on his family's vineyard in the Coonawarra wine region. Leith is one of six children and was determined from a young age that his chosen career would involve sport.
