= Swimming at the 2006 Commonwealth Games – Men's 400 metre freestyle =

Men's 400 metre freestyle at the 2006 Commonwealth Games
- Venue: Melbourne Sports and Aquatic Centre
- Winning time: 3:48.17

Medalists
gold medal	David Carry	Scotland
silver medal	Andrew Hurd	Canada
bronze medal	David Davies	Wales

The men's 400 metre freestyle event at the 2006 Commonwealth Games took place at the Melbourne Sports and Aquatic Centre.

== Men's 400 m Freestyle - Final ==
Pos.	Lane	Athlete	R.T.	50 m	100 m	150 m	200 m	250 m	300 m	350 m	400 m	Tbh.
	3	(Scotland) David Carry (SCO)	0.82	26.34; 26.34	55.07; 28.73	1:24.40; 29.33	1:53.60; 29.20	2:22.60; 29.00	2:51.33; 28.73	3:20.15; 28.82	3:48.17; 28.02	
	6	(Canada) Andrew Hurd (CAN)	0.92	26.81; 26.81	55.77; 28.96	1:24.87; 29.10	1:54.10; 29.23	2:22.85; 28.75	2:51.99; 29.14	3:20.96; 28.97	3:49.08; 28.12	0.91
	5	(Wales) David Davies (WAL)	0.80	26.81; 26.81	55.62; 28.81	1:24.30; 28.68	1:53.25; 28.95	2:22.09; 28.84	2:51.24; 29.15	3:20.65; 29.41	3:49.44; 28.79	1.27
4	4	(Australia) Craig Stevens (AUS)	0.78	26.87; 26.87	55.76; 28.89	1:25.38; 29.62	1:55.18; 29.80	2:24.77; 29.59	2:54.35; 29.58	3:23.80; 29.45	3:51.96; 28.16	3.79
5	2	(South Africa) Jean Basson (RSA)	0.76	26.87; 26.87	56.15; 29.28	1:25.71; 29.56	1:55.49; 29.78	2:24.82; 29.33	2:54.27; 29.45	3:23.68; 29.41	3:52.29; 28.61	4.12
6	8	(South Africa) Mark Randall (RSA)	0.80	26.62; 26.62	55.97; 29.35	1:25.41; 29.44	1:54.88; 29.47	2:24.30; 29.42	2:54.13; 29.83	3:23.72; 29.59	3:52.30; 28.58	4.13
7	7	(Scotland) Robert Renwick (SCO)	0.78	26.25; 26.25	55.77; 29.52	1:25.34; 29.57	1:55.03; 29.69	2:24.64; 29.61	2:54.67; 30.03	3:24.72; 30.05	3:54.04; 29.32	5.87
8	1	(Canada) Ryan Cochrane (CAN)	0.97	27.40; 27.40	56.86; 29.46	1:26.46; 29.60	1:56.39; 29.93	2:26.43; 30.04	2:56.16; 29.73	3:26.45; 30.29	3:54.24; 27.79	6.07

== Men's 400 m Freestyle - Heats ==
=== Men's 400 m Freestyle - Heat 01 ===
Pos.	Lane	Athlete	R.T.	50 m	100 m	150 m	200 m	250 m	300 m	350 m	400 m	Tbh.
1	4	(Wales) David Davies (WAL)	0.83	27.08; 27.08	56.13; 29.05	1:25.78; 29.65	1:55.61; 29.83	2:25.02; 29.41	2:53.87; 28.85	3:22.99; 29.12	3:51.39; 28.40	
2	6	(South Africa) Jean Basson (RSA)	0.72	27.45; 27.45	56.53; 29.08	1:26.02; 29.49	1:55.87; 29.85	2:25.17; 29.30	2:54.60; 29.43	3:23.49; 28.89	3:52.63; 29.14	1.24
3	3	(Canada) Ryan Cochrane (CAN)	0.92	27.57; 27.57	56.94; 29.37	1:26.35; 29.41	1:56.05; 29.70	2:25.73; 29.68	2:55.77; 30.04	3:25.38; 29.61	3:53.27; 27.89	1.88
4	5	(Canada) Colin Russell (CAN)	0.77	27.27; 27.27	56.74; 29.47	1:26.18; 29.44	1:56.05; 29.87	2:25.84; 29.79	2:55.58; 29.74	3:25.01; 29.43	3:53.73; 28.72	2.34
5	7	(Seychelles) Steven Mangroo (SEY)	0.83	28.13; 28.13	58.85; 30.72	1:31.76; 32.91	2:05.53; 33.77	2:39.62; 34.09	3:14.29; 34.67	3:49.41; 35.12	4:23.83; 34.42	32.44
6	2	(Mauritius) Chris Hackel (MRI)	0.88	28.55; 28.55	1:00.05; 31.50	1:32.27; 32.22	2:06.31; 34.04	2:41.15; 34.84	3:16.49; 35.34	3:51.58; 35.09	4:25.61; 34.03	34.22

=== Men's 400 m Freestyle - Heat 02 ===
Pos.	Lane	Athlete	R.T.	50 m	100 m	150 m	200 m	250 m	300 m	350 m	400 m	Tbh.
1	4	(Canada) Andrew Hurd (CAN)	0.92	26.96; 26.96	56.23; 29.27	1:25.72; 29.49	1:55.34; 29.62	2:24.66; 29.32	2:54.27; 29.61	3:23.83; 29.56	3:52.48; 28.65	
2	3	(Scotland) Robert Renwick (SCO)	0.78	26.10; 26.10	55.23; 29.13	1:24.81; 29.58	1:54.77; 29.96	2:25.02; 30.25	2:54.93; 29.91	3:24.20; 29.27	3:52.69; 28.49	0.21
3	6	(South Africa) Troyden Prinsloo (RSA)	0.69	27.33; 27.33	56.57; 29.24	1:26.14; 29.57	1:55.87; 29.73	2:25.59; 29.72	2:55.52; 29.93	3:25.19; 29.67	3:53.91; 28.72	1.43
4	5	(Australia) Nicholas Ffrost (AUS)	0.81	27.11; 27.11	56.32; 29.21	1:25.70; 29.38	1:55.54; 29.84	2:25.29; 29.75	2:55.29; 30.00	3:25.14; 29.85	3:55.52; 30.38	3.04
5	2	(Guernsey) Jonathon Le Noury (GUE)	0.84	28.31; 28.31	58.96; 30.65	1:31.12; 32.16	2:03.05; 31.93	2:35.20; 32.15	3:07.49; 32.29	3:39.74; 32.25	4:10.64; 30.90	18.16
6	7	(Gibraltar) Colin Bensadon (GIB)	0.87	28.49; 28.49	59.47; 30.98	1:31.71; 32.24	2:05.02; 33.31	2:38.07; 33.05	3:11.41; 33.34	3:44.90; 33.49	4:17.22; 32.32	24.74

=== Men's 400 m Freestyle - Heat 03 ===
Pos.	Lane	Athlete	R.T.	50 m	100 m	150 m	200 m	250 m	300 m	350 m	400 m	Tbh.
1	5	(Australia) Craig Stevens (AUS)	0.77	27.28; 27.28	56.37; 29.09	1:25.56; 29.19	1:55.09; 29.53	2:24.45; 29.36	2:53.91; 29.46	3:23.19; 29.28	3:51.26; 28.07	
2	4	(Scotland) David Carry (SCO)	0.82	26.91; 26.91	56.26; 29.35	1:25.54; 29.28	1:54.84; 29.30	2:24.50; 29.66	2:54.14; 29.64	3:23.49; 29.35	3:51.66; 28.17	0.40
3	3	(South Africa) Mark Randall (RSA)	0.79	27.01; 27.01	55.97; 28.96	1:25.36; 29.39	1:55.03; 29.67	2:24.67; 29.64	2:54.47; 29.80	3:24.36; 29.89	3:53.60; 29.24	2.34
4	6	(Scotland) Andrew Hunter (SCO)	0.73	26.95; 26.95	56.68; 29.73	1:26.16; 29.48	1:56.55; 30.39	2:26.38; 29.83	2:56.50; 30.12	3:26.22; 29.72	3:55.68; 29.46	4.42
5	2	(Singapore) Mingzhe Cheah (SIN)	0.86	27.92; 27.92	58.96; 31.04	1:30.39; 31.43	2:01.70; 31.31	2:32.88; 31.18	3:04.70; 31.82	3:37.10; 32.40	4:09.68; 32.58	18.42
6	7	(Bermuda) Ronald Cowen (BER)	0.82	27.84; 27.84	58.79; 30.95	1:30.19; 31.40	2:01.90; 31.71	2:33.90; 32.00	3:06.47; 32.57	3:39.86; 33.39	4:14.08; 34.22	22.82
