= Troyden Prinsloo =

South African swimmer (born 1985)

Personal information
- Full name: Hercules Troyden Prinsloo
- National team: South Africa
- Born: 16 November 1985 (age 40)

Sport
- Sport: Swimming
- Strokes: Freestyle
- College team: University of Georgia
Medal record
Men's swimming
Representing South Africa
Pan Pacific Championships
Silver medal – second place	2006 Victoria	800 m freestyle
All-Africa Games
Gold medal – first place	2007 Algiers	400 m freestyle
Gold medal – first place	2007 Algiers	800 m freestyle
Gold medal – first place	2007 Algiers	1500 m freestyle

Hercules Troyden Prinsloo (born 16 November 1985) is a freestyle swimmer from South Africa, who won three gold medals at the 2007 All-Africa Games. Previously he earned a silver medal in the men's 800m freestyle at the Pan Pacific Games, and placed third at the 2006 Commonwealth Games in the men's 1500m freestyle. He also represented South Africa at the 2008 Summer Olympics in Beijing and at the 2012 Summer Olympics in London.

== Major results ==
=== Individual ===
==== Long course ====
Year	Competition	Venue	Position	Event	Notes
Representing South Africa
2005	World Championships	Montreal, Canada	18th (h)	800 m freestyle	7:59.69
2005	World Championships	Montreal, Canada	11th (h)	1500 m freestyle	15:16.60
2006	Commonwealth Games	Melbourne, Australia	10th (h)	400 m freestyle	3:53.91
2006	Commonwealth Games	Melbourne, Australia	3rd	1500 m freestyle	15:11.88
2006	Pan Pacific Championships	Victoria, Canada	-	400 m freestyle *^{1}	DNS
2006	Pan Pacific Championships	Victoria, Canada	2nd	800 m freestyle	7:56.82
2006	Pan Pacific Championships	Victoria, Canada	7th	1500 m freestyle	15:19.25
2007	All-Africa Games	Algiers, Algeria	1st	400 m freestyle	3:55.29
2007	All-Africa Games	Algiers, Algeria	1st	800 m freestyle	8:02.84
2007	All-Africa Games	Algiers, Algeria	1st	1500 m freestyle	15:24.93
2008	Olympic Games	Beijing, China	22nd (h)	1500 m freestyle	15:12.64

- ^{1} Did not start in the final B. (At the heats, he finished 12th place with 3:54.10)

==== Short course ====
Year	Competition	Venue	Position	Event	Notes
Representing South Africa
2004	World Championships	Indianapolis, United States	11th (h)	400 m freestyle	3:49.3
2004	World Championships	Indianapolis, United States	5th	1500 m freestyle	14:57.76
2004	World Championships	Indianapolis, United States	17th (h)	400 m medley	4:27.21

==== Open water swimming ====
Year	Competition	Venue	Position	Event	Notes
Representing South Africa
2011	World Championships	Shanghai, China	21st	5 km	56:37.3
2011	World Championships	Shanghai, China	38th	10 km	1:58:48.5
2012	Olympic Games	(United Kingdom) London, Great Britain	12th	10 km	1:50:52.9
2013	World Championships	Barcelona, Spain	51st	10 km	1:51:48.0
2013	World Championships	Barcelona, Spain	28th	25 km	5:03:19.8

=== Relay ===
==== Short course ====
Year	Competition	Venue	Position	Event	Notes
Representing South Africa
2004	World Championships	Indianapolis, United States	10th (h)	4 × 100 m freestyle	3:27.64
2004	World Championships	Indianapolis, United States	6th	4 × 200 m freestyle	7:18.94

== See also ==
- List of Commonwealth Games medallists in swimming (men)
