= 2002 Pan Pacific Swimming Championships – Men's 800 metre freestyle =

Men's 800 metre freestyle at the 2002 Pan Pacific Swimming Championships
- Venue: Yokohama International Swimming Pool
- Dates: August 25, 2002 (heats & finals)
- Competitors: 9 from 6 nations
- Winning time: 7:44.78

Medalists
gold medal	Grant Hackett	Australia
silver medal	Larsen Jensen	United States
bronze medal	Chris Thompson	United States

The men's 800 metre freestyle competition at the 2002 Pan Pacific Swimming Championships took place on August 25 at the Yokohama International Swimming Pool. The last champion was Grant Hackett of Australia, in 1997. This event was not held in 1999.

This event was a timed-final where each swimmer swam just once.

== Records ==
Prior to this competition, the existing world and Pan Pacific records were as follows:

World record	Ian Thorpe (AUS)	7:39.16	Fukuoka, Japan	July 24, 2001
Pan Pacific Championships record	Daniel Kowalski (AUS)	7:50.28	Atlanta, United States	August 10, 1995

== Results ==
All times are in minutes and seconds.

KEY:	q	Fastest non-qualifiers	Q	Qualified	CR	Championships record	NR	National record	PB	Personal best	SB	Seasonal best

Rank	Heat	Lane	Name	Nationality	Time	Notes
1st place, gold medalist(s)	2	5	Grant Hackett	Australia	7:44.78	CR
2nd place, silver medalist(s)	2	2	Larsen Jensen	United States	7:52.05	
3rd place, bronze medalist(s)	2	4	Chris Thompson	United States	7:56.69	
4	2	7	Craig Stevens	Australia	7:56.86	
5	2	3	Shunichi Fujita	Japan	8:01.97	
6	2	6	Takeshi Matsuda	Japan	8:11.22	
7	2	1	Kurtis MacGillivary	Canada	8:12.27	
8	1	4	Bruno Bonfim	Brazil	8:27.10	
9	2	8	Kwok Leung Chung	Hong Kong	8:36.77	
