= 1997 Pan Pacific Swimming Championships – Men's 800 metre freestyle =

Men's 800 metre freestyle at the 1997 Pan Pacific Swimming Championships
- Venue: NISHI Civic Pool
- Dates: August 10, 1997 (heats & finals)
- Competitors: 9 from 4 nations
- Winning time: 7:50.30

Medalists
gold medal	Grant Hackett	Australia
silver medal	Chad Carvin	United States
bronze medal	Tyler Painter	United States

The men's 800 metre freestyle competition at the 1997 Pan Pacific Swimming Championships took place on August 10 at the NISHI Civic Pool. The last champion was Daniel Kowalski of Australia.

This event was a timed-final where each swimmer swam just once.

== Records ==
Prior to this competition, the existing world and Pan Pacific records were as follows:

World record	Kieren Perkins (AUS)	7:46.00	Victoria, Canada	August 24, 1994
Pan Pacific Championships record	Daniel Kowalski (AUS)	7:50.28	Atlanta, United States	August 10, 1995

== Results ==
All times are in minutes and seconds.

KEY:	q	Fastest non-qualifiers	Q	Qualified	CR	Championships record	NR	National record	PB	Personal best	SB	Seasonal best

Rank	Name	Nationality	Time	Notes
1st place, gold medalist(s)	Grant Hackett	Australia	7:50.30	
2nd place, silver medalist(s)	Chad Carvin	United States	7:57.82	
3rd place, bronze medalist(s)	Tyler Painter	United States	8:01.17	
4	Masato Hirano	Japan	8:06.81	
5	Tim Siciliano	United States	8:07.31	
6	Jason Samuelson	Australia	8:08.80	
7	Torlarp Sethsothorn	Thailand	8:11.02	
8	Hisato Yasui	Japan	8:19.43	
9	Matthew Smith	Australia	8:22.69	
