= Swimming at the 2006 Commonwealth Games – Men's 1500 metre freestyle =

The Men's 1500m freestyle event took place on 21 March 2006 at the Melbourne Sports and Aquatic Centre in Melbourne, Australia. The event was won by 21 year old Dave Davies of Wales in a time of 14:57.63. In doing so, Davies became the first Welsh swimming champion in 32 years. Andrew Hurd from Canada placed second with a time of 15:09.44, while South Africa's Hercules Prinsloo placed third with a time of 15:11.88.

== Men's 1500 m Freestyle - Final ==
Pos.	Lane	Athlete	R.T.									Tbh.
	4	(Wales) David Davies (WAL)	0.82	50 m 26.99; 26.99	100 m 56.15; 29.16	150 m 1:25.97; 29.82	200 m 1:55.76; 29.79	250 m 2:25.69; 29.93	300 m 2:55.59; 29.90	350 m 3:25.52; 29.93	400 m 3:55.39; 29.87	
				450 m 4:25.28; 29.89	500 m 4:55.19; 29.91	550 m 5:25.30; 30.11	600 m 5:55.23; 29.93	650 m 6:25.40; 30.17	700 m 6:55.42; 30.02	750 m 7:25.68; 30.26	800 m 7:55.74; 30.06	
				850 m 8:25.85; 30.11	900 m 8:55.97; 30.12	950 m 9:26.37; 30.40	1000 m 9:56.66; 30.29	1050 m 10:27.14; 30.48	1100 m 10:57.13; 29.99	1150 m 11:27.58; 30.45	1200 m 11:57.73; 30.15	
				1250 m 12:28.27; 30.54	1300 m 12:58.74; 30.47	1350 m 13:28.84; 30.10	1400 m 13:59.04; 30.20	1450 m 14:28.96; 29.92	1500 m 14:57.63; 28.67			
	6	(Canada) Andrew Hurd (CAN)	0.91	50 m 28.07; 28.07	100 m 58.68; 30.61	150 m 1:29.48; 30.80	200 m 2:00.35; 30.87	250 m 2:30.97; 30.62	300 m 3:01.88; 30.91	350 m 3:32.64; 30.76	400 m 4:03.69; 31.05	
				450 m 4:34.49; 30.80	500 m 5:05.77; 31.28	550 m 5:35.98; 30.21	600 m 6:06.67; 30.69	650 m 6:37.20; 30.53	700 m 7:07.56; 30.36	750 m 7:38.00; 30.44	800 m 8:08.39; 30.39	
				850 m 8:38.59; 30.20	900 m 9:08.82; 30.23	950 m 9:39.00; 30.18	1000 m 10:08.92; 29.92	1050 m 10:38.96; 30.04	1100 m 11:09.10; 30.14	1150 m 11:39.30; 30.20	1200 m 12:09.76; 30.46	
				1250 m 12:39.65; 29.89	1300 m 13:10.20; 30.55	1350 m 13:40.10; 29.90	1400 m 14:10.08; 29.98	1450 m 14:39.91; 29.83	1500 m 15:09.44; 29.53			11.81
	5	(South Africa) Troyden Prinsloo (RSA)	0.72	50 m 28.36; 28.36	100 m 58.61; 30.25	150 m 1:28.92; 30.31	200 m 1:59.18; 30.26	250 m 2:29.33; 30.15	300 m 2:59.50; 30.17	350 m 3:29.88; 30.38	400 m 4:00.27; 30.39	
				450 m 4:30.61; 30.34	500 m 5:00.91; 30.30	550 m 5:31.54; 30.63	600 m 6:01.94; 30.40	650 m 6:32.54; 30.60	700 m 7:02.85; 30.31	750 m 7:33.33; 30.48	800 m 8:03.70; 30.37	
				850 m 8:34.19; 30.49	900 m 9:04.49; 30.30	950 m 9:34.81; 30.32	1000 m 10:05.26; 30.45	1050 m 10:35.97; 30.71	1100 m 11:06.55; 30.58	1150 m 11:37.45; 30.90	1200 m 12:08.15; 30.70	
				1250 m 12:39.26; 31.11	1300 m 13:10.06; 30.80	1350 m 13:40.97; 30.91	1400 m 14:11.38; 30.41	1450 m 14:42.32; 30.94	1500 m 15:11.88; 29.56			14.25
4	7	(South Africa) Mark Randall (RSA)	0.77	50 m 28.22; 28.22	100 m 58.38; 30.16	150 m 1:28.53; 30.15	200 m 1:58.76; 30.23	250 m 2:29.10; 30.34	300 m 2:59.39; 30.29	350 m 3:29.61; 30.22	400 m 3:59.81; 30.20	
				450 m 4:30.25; 30.44	500 m 5:00.96; 30.71	550 m 5:31.48; 30.52	600 m 6:02.16; 30.68	650 m 6:32.85; 30.69	700 m 7:03.49; 30.64	750 m 7:33.99; 30.50	800 m 8:04.61; 30.62	
				850 m 8:35.18; 30.57	900 m 9:06.03; 30.85	950 m 9:36.76; 30.73	1000 m 10:07.45; 30.69	1050 m 10:38.20; 30.75	1100 m 11:08.90; 30.70	1150 m 11:39.68; 30.78	1200 m 12:10.57; 30.89	
				1250 m 12:41.25; 30.68	1300 m 13:12.23; 30.98	1350 m 13:43.34; 31.11	1400 m 14:14.69; 31.35	1450 m 14:45.66; 30.97	1500 m 15:15.94; 30.28			18.31
5	1	(Canada) Ryan Cochrane (CAN)	0.94	50 m 28.43; 28.43	100 m 59.35; 30.92	150 m 1:29.66; 30.31	200 m 2:00.28; 30.62	250 m 2:30.82; 30.54	300 m 3:00.98; 30.16	350 m 3:31.50; 30.52	400 m 4:01.91; 30.41	
				450 m 4:32.48; 30.57	500 m 5:03.28; 30.80	550 m 5:34.01; 30.73	600 m 6:04.80; 30.79	650 m 6:35.51; 30.71	700 m 7:06.23; 30.72	750 m 7:37.41; 31.18	800 m 8:08.75; 31.34	
				850 m 8:39.89; 31.14	900 m 9:10.81; 30.92	950 m 9:42.01; 31.20	1000 m 10:13.08; 31.07	1050 m 10:44.35; 31.27	1100 m 11:15.42; 31.07	1150 m 11:46.99; 31.57	1200 m 12:18.06; 31.07	
				1250 m 12:49.45; 31.39	1300 m 13:20.65; 31.20	1350 m 13:52.00; 31.35	1400 m 14:23.16; 31.16	1450 m 14:53.78; 30.62	1500 m 15:21.94; 28.16			24.31
6	2	(Australia) Craig Stevens (AUS)	0.77	50 m 28.47; 28.47	100 m 58.70; 30.23	150 m 1:29.14; 30.44	200 m 1:59.57; 30.43	250 m 2:30.06; 30.49	300 m 3:00.36; 30.30	350 m 3:30.99; 30.63	400 m 4:01.62; 30.63	
				450 m 4:32.40; 30.78	500 m 5:03.34; 30.94	550 m 5:34.22; 30.88	600 m 6:05.14; 30.92	650 m 6:36.19; 31.05	700 m 7:06.99; 30.80	750 m 7:37.84; 30.85	800 m 8:08.73; 30.89	
				850 m 8:39.87; 31.14	900 m 9:10.81; 30.94	950 m 9:41.97; 31.16	1000 m 10:13.02; 31.05	1050 m 10:44.25; 31.23	1100 m 11:15.39; 31.14	1150 m 11:46.88; 31.49	1200 m 12:18.07; 31.19	
				1250 m 12:49.50; 31.43	1300 m 13:20.60; 31.10	1350 m 13:51.97; 31.37	1400 m 14:22.92; 30.95	1450 m 14:53.76; 30.84	1500 m 15:22.10; 28.34			24.47
7	3	(Australia) Travis Nederpelt (AUS)	0.82	50 m 28.77; 28.77	100 m 59.08; 30.31	150 m 1:29.48; 30.40	200 m 2:00.30; 30.82	250 m 2:31.04; 30.74	300 m 3:02.32; 31.28	350 m 3:33.48; 31.16	400 m 4:05.04; 31.56	
				450 m 4:36.12; 31.08	500 m 5:07.08; 30.96	550 m 5:37.86; 30.78	600 m 6:09.52; 31.66	650 m 6:40.71; 31.19	700 m 7:12.26; 31.55	750 m 7:43.68; 31.42	800 m 8:15.67; 31.99	
				850 m 8:47.35; 31.68	900 m 9:18.77; 31.42	950 m 9:50.56; 31.79	1000 m 10:22.39; 31.83	1050 m 10:53.90; 31.51	1100 m 11:25.98; 32.08	1150 m 11:58.11; 32.13	1200 m 12:30.54; 32.43	
				1250 m 13:02.80; 32.26	1300 m 13:34.89; 32.09	1350 m 14:06.17; 31.28	1400 m 14:38.04; 31.87	1450 m 15:10.05; 32.01	1500 m 15:41.38; 31.33			43.75
8	8	(Singapore) Mingzhe Cheah (SIN)	0.87	50 m 29.49; 29.49	100 m 1:01.62; 32.13	150 m 1:34.18; 32.56	200 m 2:06.89; 32.71	250 m 2:39.41; 32.52	300 m 3:12.47; 33.06	350 m 3:44.99; 32.52	400 m 4:17.82; 32.83	
				450 m 4:50.36; 32.54	500 m 5:23.08; 32.72	550 m 5:55.21; 32.13	600 m 6:27.65; 32.44	650 m 7:00.28; 32.63	700 m 7:32.99; 32.71	750 m 8:05.66; 32.67	800 m 8:38.58; 32.92	
				850 m 9:10.92; 32.34	900 m 9:43.79; 32.87	950 m 10:16.79; 33.00	1000 m 10:49.67; 32.88	1050 m 11:22.27; 32.60	1100 m 11:55.51; 33.24	1150 m 12:28.55; 33.04	1200 m 13:01.72; 33.17	
				1250 m 13:34.35; 32.63	1300 m 14:07.29; 32.94	1350 m 14:40.18; 32.89	1400 m 15:13.37; 33.19	1450 m 15:46.41; 33.04	1500 m 16:18.34; 31.93			1:20.71

== Men's 1500 m Freestyle - Heats ==
=== Men's 1500 m Freestyle - Heat 01 ===
Pos.	Lane	Athlete	R.T.									Tbh.
1	3	(Canada) Andrew Hurd (CAN)	0.94	50 m 29.72; 29.72	100 m 1:01.72; 32.00	150 m 1:33.97; 32.25	200 m 2:05.97; 32.00	250 m 2:38.30; 32.33	300 m 3:10.61; 32.31	350 m 3:42.83; 32.22	400 m 4:15.15; 32.32	
				450 m 4:47.22; 32.07	500 m 5:19.37; 32.15	550 m 5:51.42; 32.05	600 m 6:23.34; 31.92	650 m 6:55.13; 31.79	700 m 7:27.34; 32.21	750 m 7:59.17; 31.83	800 m 8:31.40; 32.23	
				850 m 9:03.06; 31.66	900 m 9:34.95; 31.89	950 m 10:07.14; 32.19	1000 m 10:39.19; 32.05	1050 m 11:10.47; 31.28	1100 m 11:41.69; 31.22	1150 m 12:12.82; 31.13	1200 m 12:43.48; 30.66	
				1250 m 13:14.76; 31.28	1300 m 13:45.82; 31.06	1350 m 14:16.53; 30.71	1400 m 14:47.16; 30.63	1450 m 15:17.63; 30.47	1500 m 15:46.87; 29.24			
2	4	(Australia) Craig Stevens (AUS)	0.84	50 m 29.32; 29.32	100 m 1:01.35; 32.03	150 m 1:33.21; 31.86	200 m 2:05.37; 32.16	250 m 2:37.69; 32.32	300 m 3:10.06; 32.37	350 m 3:41.97; 31.91	400 m 4:14.06; 32.09	
				450 m 4:46.19; 32.13	500 m 5:18.60; 32.41	550 m 5:50.50; 31.90	600 m 6:22.67; 32.17	650 m 6:54.66; 31.99	700 m 7:26.77; 32.11	750 m 7:58.52; 31.75	800 m 8:30.55; 32.03	
				850 m 9:02.49; 31.94	900 m 9:34.59; 32.10	950 m 10:06.37; 31.78	1000 m 10:38.37; 32.00	1050 m 11:10.13; 31.76	1100 m 11:41.75; 31.62	1150 m 12:13.00; 31.25	1200 m 12:44.50; 31.50	
				1250 m 13:15.93; 31.43	1300 m 13:47.05; 31.12	1350 m 14:17.86; 30.81	1400 m 14:48.55; 30.69	1450 m 15:19.35; 30.80	1500 m 15:48.37; 29.02			1.50
3	5	(Canada) Ryan Cochrane (CAN)	0.94	50 m 29.68; 29.68	100 m 1:02.12; 32.44	150 m 1:34.31; 32.19	200 m 2:06.62; 32.31	250 m 2:38.92; 32.30	300 m 3:11.27; 32.35	350 m 3:43.34; 32.07	400 m 4:15.32; 31.98	
				450 m 4:47.50; 32.18	500 m 5:19.57; 32.07	550 m 5:50.76; 31.19	600 m 6:22.73; 31.97	650 m 6:54.61; 31.88	700 m 7:26.90; 32.29	750 m 7:58.84; 31.94	800 m 8:30.57; 31.73	
				850 m 9:02.62; 32.05	900 m 9:34.82; 32.20	950 m 10:06.62; 31.80	1000 m 10:38.59; 31.97	1050 m 11:10.16; 31.57	1100 m 11:41.77; 31.61	1150 m 12:13.34; 31.57	1200 m 12:44.93; 31.59	
				1250 m 13:16.65; 31.72	1300 m 13:48.43; 31.78	1350 m 14:20.68; 32.25	1400 m 14:52.65; 31.97	1450 m 15:24.62; 31.97	1500 m 15:55.55; 30.93			8.68
4	6	(Singapore) Mingzhe Cheah (SIN)	0.88	50 m 29.86; 29.86	100 m 1:02.37; 32.51	150 m 1:35.29; 32.92	200 m 2:08.44; 33.15	250 m 2:41.96; 33.52	300 m 3:14.94; 32.98	350 m 3:47.89; 32.95	400 m 4:21.05; 33.16	
				450 m 4:54.29; 33.24	500 m 5:27.63; 33.34	550 m 6:00.78; 33.15	600 m 6:34.43; 33.65	650 m 7:08.05; 33.62	700 m 7:41.22; 33.17	750 m 8:14.57; 33.35	800 m 8:47.74; 33.17	
				850 m 9:21.03; 33.29	900 m 9:54.21; 33.18	950 m 10:27.32; 33.11	1000 m 11:00.69; 33.37	1050 m 11:33.60; 32.91	1100 m 12:06.80; 33.20	1150 m 12:39.53; 32.73	1200 m 13:12.43; 32.90	
				1250 m 13:45.19; 32.76	1300 m 14:18.25; 33.06	1350 m 14:51.40; 33.15	1400 m 15:24.34; 32.94	1450 m 15:56.81; 32.47	1500 m 16:28.87; 32.06			42.00

=== Men's 1500 m Freestyle - Heat 02 ===
Pos.	Lane	Athlete	R.T.									Tbh.
1	4	(Wales) David Davies (WAL)	0.84	50 m 28.65; 28.65	100 m 59.70; 31.05	150 m 1:30.94; 31.24	200 m 2:02.40; 31.46	250 m 2:33.72; 31.32	300 m 3:05.18; 31.46	350 m 3:36.17; 30.99	400 m 4:07.52; 31.35	
				450 m 4:38.22; 30.70	500 m 5:08.97; 30.75	550 m 5:40.21; 31.24	600 m 6:11.36; 31.15	650 m 6:41.97; 30.61	700 m 7:12.55; 30.58	750 m 7:43.23; 30.68	800 m 8:13.73; 30.50	
				850 m 8:44.26; 30.53	900 m 9:14.68; 30.42	950 m 9:45.14; 30.46	1000 m 10:15.80; 30.66	1050 m 10:46.39; 30.59	1100 m 11:16.94; 30.55	1150 m 11:47.58; 30.64	1200 m 12:18.44; 30.86	
				1250 m 12:49.18; 30.74	1300 m 13:20.10; 30.92	1350 m 13:50.60; 30.50	1400 m 14:21.21; 30.61	1450 m 14:51.56; 30.35	1500 m 15:21.60; 30.04			
2	5	(South Africa) Hercules Prinsloo (RSA)	0.71	50 m 29.17; 29.17	100 m 1:00.80; 31.63	150 m 1:32.34; 31.54	200 m 2:03.86; 31.52	250 m 2:35.42; 31.56	300 m 3:07.07; 31.65	350 m 3:38.79; 31.72	400 m 4:10.25; 31.46	
				450 m 4:41.60; 31.35	500 m 5:13.04; 31.44	550 m 5:44.57; 31.53	600 m 6:16.07; 31.50	650 m 6:47.74; 31.67	700 m 7:18.99; 31.25	750 m 7:50.55; 31.56	800 m 8:22.05; 31.50	
				850 m 8:53.33; 31.28	900 m 9:24.64; 31.31	950 m 9:56.07; 31.43	1000 m 10:27.82; 31.75	1050 m 10:58.71; 30.89	1100 m 11:29.77; 31.06	1150 m 12:00.64; 30.87	1200 m 12:31.20; 30.56	
				1250 m 13:01.86; 30.66	1300 m 13:32.40; 30.54	1350 m 14:03.02; 30.62	1400 m 14:33.50; 30.48	1450 m 15:04.05; 30.55	1500 m 15:34.58; 30.53			12.98
3	3	(Australia) Travis Nederpelt (AUS)	0.85	50 m 28.98; 28.98	100 m 1:00.28; 31.30	150 m 1:31.71; 31.43	200 m 2:03.79; 32.08	250 m 2:34.36; 30.57	300 m 3:05.49; 31.13	350 m 3:36.75; 31.26	400 m 4:08.18; 31.43	
				450 m 4:39.23; 31.05	500 m 5:09.82; 30.59	550 m 5:40.77; 30.95	600 m 6:11.94; 31.17	650 m 6:43.07; 31.13	700 m 7:14.06; 30.99	750 m 7:44.41; 30.35	800 m 8:15.35; 30.94	
				850 m 8:46.40; 31.05	900 m 9:17.53; 31.13	950 m 9:49.04; 31.51	1000 m 10:20.92; 31.88	1050 m 10:52.50; 31.58	1100 m 11:24.22; 31.72	1150 m 11:56.25; 32.03	1200 m 12:27.93; 31.68	
				1250 m 13:00.03; 32.10	1300 m 13:31.09; 31.06	1350 m 14:02.49; 31.40	1400 m 14:34.05; 31.56	1450 m 15:05.45; 31.40	1500 m 15:36.40; 30.95			14.80
4	6	(South Africa) Mark Randall (RSA)	0.86	50 m 29.58; 29.58	100 m 1:01.27; 31.69	150 m 1:32.98; 31.71	200 m 2:04.72; 31.74	250 m 2:36.54; 31.82	300 m 3:08.59; 32.05	350 m 3:40.55; 31.96	400 m 4:12.67; 32.12	
				450 m 4:44.60; 31.93	500 m 5:17.00; 32.40	550 m 5:49.01; 32.01	600 m 6:21.09; 32.08	650 m 6:53.15; 32.06	700 m 7:25.15; 32.00	750 m 7:56.50; 31.35	800 m 8:27.87; 31.37	
				850 m 8:59.20; 31.33	900 m 9:30.57; 31.37	950 m 10:01.89; 31.32	1000 m 10:33.17; 31.28	1050 m 11:04.56; 31.39	1100 m 11:36.07; 31.51	1150 m 12:07.66; 31.59	1200 m 12:39.73; 32.07	
				1250 m 13:11.13; 31.40	1300 m 13:42.87; 31.74	1350 m 14:14.47; 31.60	1400 m 14:45.87; 31.40	1450 m 15:17.21; 31.34	1500 m 15:48.75; 31.54			27.15
5	2	(Guernsey) Jonathon Le Noury (GUE)	0.86	50 m 28.83; 28.83	100 m 1:01.32; 32.49	150 m 1:34.51; 33.19	200 m 2:07.74; 33.23	250 m 2:40.62; 32.88	300 m 3:14.15; 33.53	350 m 3:47.49; 33.34	400 m 4:20.68; 33.19	
				450 m 4:54.28; 33.60	500 m 5:27.47; 33.19	550 m 6:01.31; 33.84	600 m 6:34.89; 33.58	650 m 7:08.74; 33.85	700 m 7:42.67; 33.93	750 m 8:16.81; 34.14	800 m 8:50.81; 34.00	
				850 m 9:24.72; 33.91	900 m 9:58.36; 33.64	950 m 10:32.38; 34.02	1000 m 11:06.51; 34.13	1050 m 11:40.29; 33.78	1100 m 12:14.10; 33.81	1150 m 12:47.66; 33.56	1200 m 13:21.41; 33.75	
				1250 m 13:55.19; 33.78	1300 m 14:28.60; 33.41	1350 m 15:01.87; 33.27	1400 m 15:35.15; 33.28	1450 m 16:07.32; 32.17	1500 m 16:38.61; 31.29			1:17.01
