= Heiko Hell =

German swimmer (born 1980)

Personal information
- Full name: Heiko Hell
- National team: Germany
- Born: 5 May 1980 (age 46) Pinneberg, Schleswig-Holstein, West Germany
- Height: 1.88 m (6 ft 2 in)
- Weight: 77 kg (170 lb)

Sport
- Sport: Swimming
- Strokes: Freestyle
- Club: SGS Hamburg
- Coach: Dirk Lange

Heiko Hell (born 5 May 1980) is a German former swimmer, who specialized in long-distance freestyle events. He is a nine-time German swimming champion in the 400, 800, and 1500 m freestyle (2000–2004), and also a three-time Olympic finalist. Hell is a member of Hamburg City Swimming Club (German: Startgemeinschaft Schwimmen Hamburg), and is coached and trained by Dirk Lange.

Hell made his official debut at the 2000 Summer Olympics in Sydney with a three-event program. On the first day of the Games, Hell missed a spot for the top 8 final of the 400 m freestyle, finishing in ninth place with a time of 3:50.80. He also competed for the sixth-place German team in the preliminary heats of the men's 4 × 200 m freestyle relay. Teaming with Michael Kiedel, Christian Keller, and Stefan Herbst, Hell swam the lead-off leg and recorded a time of 1:50.48. In his last event, 1500 m freestyle, Hell finished outside the medals in eighth place by more than 10 seconds behind Ukraine's Igor Chervynskiy in 15:19.87.

At the 2004 Summer Olympics in Athens, Hell shortened his program, swimming only in the 400 m freestyle. He finished first ahead of his teammate Christian Hein from the Olympic trials, in a FINA A-standard of 3:51.48. On the first morning of the Games, Hell placed eighteenth in the preliminaries. Swimming in heat four, he raced to fifth place by a 4.55-second margin behind winner and defending Olympic silver medalist Massimiliano Rosolino of Italy, outside his entry time of 3:52.06. He also teamed up with Jens Schreiber, Lars Conrad, and Christian Keller in the 4 × 200 m freestyle relay. Swimming the second leg, Hell recorded a split of 1:49.15, but the Germans pulled off again with a sixth-place effort, in a final time of 7:16.51.
