= Swimming at the Goodwill Games =

Swimming was one of the sports at the quadrennial Goodwill Games competition. Swimming competitions were held at every one of the five Goodwill Games. The final swimming events were held at the Games in 2001 as the 2005 edition of the Games were cancelled.

== Editions ==
Games	Year	Host city	Host country
I	1986	Moscow	Soviet Union
II	1990	Seattle, Washington	United States
III	1994	Saint Petersburg	Russia
IV	1998	New York City, New York	United States
V	2001	Brisbane, Queensland	Australia

== See also ==
- List of Goodwill Games records in swimming
