= Erik Vendt =

American competition swimmer (born 1981)

Personal information
- Full name: Erik K. Vendt
- National team: United States
- Born: January 9, 1981 (age 45) Wellesley, Massachusetts, U.S.
- Height: 5 ft 11 in (180 cm)
- Weight: 165 lb (75 kg)

Sport
- Sport: Swimming
- Strokes: Freestyle, individual medley
- Club: Ocean State Squids; Club Wolverine
- College team: University of Southern California
Medal record
Men's swimming
Representing the United States
Olympic Games
| Gold medal – first place | 2008 Beijing | 4×200 m freestyle |
| Silver medal – second place | 2000 Sydney | 400 m medley |
| Silver medal – second place | 2004 Athens | 400 m medley |
World Championships (LC)
| Silver medal – second place | 2001 Fukuoka | 400 m medley |
| Bronze medal – third place | 2003 Barcelona | 1500 freestyle |
World Championships (SC)
| Bronze medal – third place | 2002 Moscow | 4×200 m freestyle |
Pan Pacific Championships
| Silver medal – second place | 2002 Yokohama | 400 m medley |
| Silver medal – second place | 2002 Yokohama | 1500 m freestyle |
| Silver medal – second place | 2006 Victoria | 1500 m freestyle |

Erik K. Vendt (born January 9, 1981) is an American former competition swimmer. He won a silver medal at the 2000 Summer Olympics and the 2004 Summer Olympics in the 400-meter individual medley. At the 2008 Summer Olympics, Vendt won a gold medal as a member of the U.S. 4×200-meter freestyle relay team, swimming in the preliminary heats of the relay event.

== Career ==
Erik Vendt attended Boston College High School in Dorchester, Massachusetts. While in high school, Vendt swam for the Ocean State Squids club team under head coach Joshua Stern. While swimming for the Boston College high school swim team, Vendt was able to set a state record as a senior in the 500-yard freestyle with a time of 4:24.35 (1999), which is still the record today. Vendt then attended the University of Southern California and was a five-time NCAA title winner, 13-time All-American and seven-time Pac-10 title winner as a Trojan. In 2002, Vendt was named the NCAA Swimmer of the Year after winning the 1,650-yard freestyle and 400-yard individual medley, and placing second in the 500-yard freestyle.

At 2000 Olympic Trials, Vendt broke the 16-year-old American record in 1,500-meter freestyle, becoming the first American to break 15 minutes with a time of 14:59.11.

In 2001, Vendt won silver in the 400-meter individual medley at the 2001 World Championships in Fukuoka, Japan.

At the 2004 Summer Olympics, Vendt won silver at the 400-meter individual medley, losing only to Michael Phelps who set a world record, in Athens, Greece.

After the 2004 Olympics, Vendt retired for almost a year before returning to competition. Vendt returned to train at Club Wolverine under Bob Bowman, alongside Klete Keller, Michael Phelps and Peter Vanderkaay.

On February 18, 2008, Erik Vendt posted a 1,500-meter freestyle time of 14:47.59 while at the Missouri Grand Prix. In the process he set a U.S. Open record, set previously by Grant Hackett in 2003.

On May 15, 2008 in California, Vendt posted a 14:46.78, then 2008's fastest in the 1,500-meter, thereby appearing to set up a likely duel in the Beijing Olympics 1,500-meter final with Grant Hackett, who posted a 14:48.65 at the Australian Olympic Trials in March and is the two-time defending Olympic champion in the event. But it was not to be, as Vendt finished fourth in the 1,500-meter final of the U.S. Olympic Trials in Omaha on July 6.

Vendt won a gold medal in the 2008 Olympics in Beijing by swimming in the preliminary heats of the 4×200-meter freestyle relay.

After the 2008 Olympics concluded, Vendt relocated to the San Francisco Bay Area and worked for a financial company in San Francisco. Vendt currently resides in Boston MA, and works for the wearable sports optimization company, WHOOP.

== See also ==
- List of Olympic medalists in swimming (men)
- List of University of Southern California people
- List of World Aquatics Championships medalists in swimming (men)
