= Jorge Carral =

Mexican swimmer (born 1983)

Personal information
- Full name: Jorge Carral Armella
- National team: Mexico
- Born: 2 September 1983 (age 42) Mexico City, Mexico
- Height: 1.83 m (6 ft 0 in)
- Weight: 73 kg (161 lb)

Sport
- Sport: Swimming
- Strokes: Freestyle

Jorge Carral Armella (born September 2, 1983) is a Mexican former swimmer, who specialized in long-distance freestyle events. He held numerous national age group records in the 400 and 1500 m freestyle, and later represented Mexico at the 2000 Summer Olympics.

Carral competed in a long-distance freestyle double, as a 17-year-old, at the 2000 Summer Olympics in Sydney. He posted FINA B-standards of 3:56.20 (400 m freestyle) and 15:33.66 (1500 m freestyle) from the Mexican Youth Olympic Festival in Hermosillo. On the first day of the Games, Carral placed twenty-eighth in the 400 m freestyle. Swimming in heat three, he held off New Zealand's Jonathan Duncan by 0.18 of a second to take a fourth spot in 3:58.34. Nearly a week later, in the 1500 m freestyle, Carral challenged seven other swimmers in the same heat, including top favorites Ricardo Monasterio of Venezuela and Spyridon Gianniotis of Greece. He finished the program's longest race in sixth place and thirty-first overall at 15:43.03, almost ten seconds off his Mexican record and entry time.
