= Armando Negreiros =

Brazilian swimmer (born 1985)

Personal information
- Full name: Armando Souza Negreiros
- Born: 10 September 1985 (age 40) Rio de Janeiro, Brazil
- Height: 1.91 m (6 ft 3 in)
- Weight: 79 kg (174 lb)

Sport
- Sport: Swimming
- Strokes: Freestyle
Medal record
Men's swimming
Representing Brazil
Pan American Games
Bronze medal – third place	2007 Rio	400 m freestyle

Armando Souza Negreiros (born 10 September 1985) is a freestyle swimmer from Brazil.

In 2003, he reached the required rate to compete in the 800-metre freestyle at the 2003 Pan American Games in Santo Domingo, but the race was excluded from the calendar.

At the 2004 FINA World Swimming Championships (25 m) in Indianapolis, Negreiros finished 9th in the 400-metre freestyle.

On 10 September 2005, he broke the short-course South American record in the 800-metre freestyle, with a time of 7:47.17. On 18 December 2005, broke the short-course South American record in the 400-metre freestyle, with a time of 3:43.31.

At the 2006 FINA World Swimming Championships (25 m) in Shanghai, Negreiros finished 18th in the 400-metre freestyle, and dropped the 1500-metre freestyle.

He was at the 2006 Pan Pacific Swimming Championships, where he finished 9th in the 800-metre freestyle, 10th in the 400-metre freestyle, and 15th in the 1500-metre freestyle.

Participating at the 2007 World Aquatics Championships in Melbourne, he finished 11th in the 4×200-metre freestyle, 26th in the 800-metre freestyle, and 31st in the 400-metre freestyle. In Australia, he had the opportunity to train with one of his idols: Grant Hackett.

Negreiros was at the 2007 Pan American Games in Rio de Janeiro, where he won the bronze medal in the 400-metre freestyle, beating the Brazilian record with a time of 3:51.18. He also finished 8th in the 1500-metre freestyle.

On 18 July 2009, he broke the short-course South American record in the 800-metre freestyle, with a time of 7:43.52, at the Rio de Janeiro's State Winter Championships.
