= Chris Thompson (swimmer) =

American swimmer (born 1978)

Personal information
- Full name: Christopher Lee Thompson
- Nickname: "Chris"
- National team: United States
- Born: November 30, 1978 (age 47) San Diego, California, U.S.
- Height: 6 ft 5 in (1.96 m)
- Weight: 185 lb (84 kg)
- Spouse: Lindsey Smith

Sport
- Sport: Swimming
- Strokes: Freestyle
- Club: Club Wolverine; Ann Arbor, Michigan
- College team: University of Michigan
- Coach: Jon Urbanchek (Michigan)
Medal record
Men's swimming
Representing the United States
Olympic Games
Bronze medal – third place	2000 Sydney	1500 freestyle
Short Course Worlds
Silver medal – second place	2002 Moscow	1500 freestyle
Pan Pacific Championships
Bronze medal – third place	1999 Sydney	1500 freestyle
Bronze medal – third place	2002 Yokohama	800 m freestyle
Pan American Games
Bronze medal – third place	2003 Santo Domingo	1500 freestyle

Christopher Lee Thompson (born November 30, 1978) is an American former competition swimmer who competed for the University of Michigan and participated in the 2000 summer Olympics, winning a bronze medal in the 1,500-meter freestyle. He was the second American swimmer to break the 15-minute mark in the event, and held the American record for four years. He would later compete internationally in distance open water swimming events, and serve as a swim coach.

== Early life and swimming ==
Thompson was born November 30, 1978, in San Diego, California, to parents Tom and Nancy Thompson, according to a 2015 interview, though a few sources erroneously list his birthplace as Roseburg, Oregon. He grew up in Roseburg, Oregon and attended and swam for Roseburg High School, graduating in 1997. Beginning competitive swimming around the age of eight, he swam and trained as a distance swimmer in both Middle School and High School. As a swimming competitor at Roseburg High, Thompson performed consistently in competition, qualifying for the Oregon State Meet each of his four years with the team. He medaled at the state meet in at least one event each year of his High School swimming career. As a junior in 1996 at the Oregon State Championships, he captured a state title with an individual first-place finish in the 200-yard freestyle with a 1:42.27, and also took a state title in the 500-yard freestyle.

In the summer of 1996, as a gifted distance swimmer, he captured his first U.S. National title in the 1,500-meter freestyle, and would eventually win five more. He also won a US National title in the 800-meter Freestyle.

In 1996, he qualified for his first U.S. Olympic Trials, and competed with U.S. hopefuls in Indianapolis. He performed well, defeating several Division I college swimmers, and made it to the finals of the 1,500, finishing sixth, not placing high enough to make the U.S. Olympic team.

== University of Michigan ==
He attended the University of Michigan, where he was a member of the Michigan Wolverines swimming and diving team from 1997 to 2001. Both at Michigan and as a post-graduate, Chris swam under coach Jon Urbanchek. Urbanchek, who specialized in swimming distance as a collegiate competitor for Michigan from 1959-1961, was on two NCAA championship teams and was the national runner-up in the 1650-yard swim, the event in which Thompson would most excel. Thompson also credited Michigan Assistant Coach Eric Namesnik, a former Michigan swimmer and Olympic silver medalist, for helping him improve his technique and endurance. A critical part of his career training, Thompson swam with University of Michigan coaches at the University or at the Wolverines swim club, coached by Eric Namesnik, for a period of nine years.

At Michigan, Thompson was a four-time All American honoree, nine-time Big Ten Champion, and in his Senior year, won the NCAA 1,650-yard freestyle championship in 14:26.62 while setting both NCAA and American records in the event. The record held for eleven years until 2012. Thompson considered his 1,650 yard NCAA championships as one of the greatest accomplishments of his swimming career. Thompson won the 500-yard freestyle and 1,650-yard freestyle in each of the Big Ten Championships in which he competed during his four years swimming for Michigan. In 2002, he completed his BA degree at the University of Michigan, and in 2007 earned a Masters degree at Eastern Michigan University.

== 2000 Olympics ==
At the 2000 Olympic trials, Thompson placed second in the 1,500-meter freestyle final heats and made the U.S. team.

In the summer of his Junior year at Michigan, he won the bronze medal at the 2000 Summer Olympics in the men's 1,500-meter freestyle, known as the metric mile, with an American record time of 14:56.81. He was the second American swimmer to break the 15-minute mark in the 1,500-meter free, and held the American record for four years. Australian Grant Hackett took the gold with a time of 14:48.33, and Kieren Perkins, another Australian took the silver with a time of 14:53.59. Competing against stiff competition, Australian team members Hackett and Perkins were both record holders in the 1500 and the recipients of at least one gold Olympic medal in the event. Fourth place finisher Alexsey Filipets finished very closely behind Thompson only .07 seconds after Thompson with a 14:56.88.

=== International competition highlights ===
In international competition, at the Pan Pacific Championships, he captured two bronzes medals one in 1999 in the 1,500 free and one in 2002 in the 800 freestyle.

At the 2003 Pan American Games in Santo Domingo, he captured an additional bronze medal in the 1,500 freestyle event. At the 2002 Short-Course World Championships in Moscow, he won a silver in the 1,500-meter swim and a bronze that year in the 4x200 freestyle relay though he swam in the heats only.

In the 2006, Short-Course World Championships in Shanghai, he won an additional bronze in the 4x200 relay, though he swam only in the preliminary heats.

=== 2004 Olympic trials ===
While training in Colorado Springs in preparation for the 2004 Olympic trials, Thompson broke both elbows during dryland training, greatly hampering his chances to perform well at the trials. With a long recovery time hampering his ability to practice, he still made a strong effort, but placed seventh in the finals of the 1,500 free, and did not make the Olympic team.

=== Open water distance swimming ===
In 2001, Thompson win the 5K USA Swimming Open Water Championship at Millerton Lake, outside Clovis, California, with a time of 57:28.88, finishing ahead of 2000 Olympian Chad Carvin by a small margin. Carvin lost time in the race's second half, and crossed the finish 50 seconds after Thompson.

He represented the United States at a number of open water international championships, which included the prestigious 2004 FINA World Open Water Swimming Championships in Abu Dhabi, United Arab Emirates. Thompson was a first-place finisher at the San Francisco Bay 2002 RCP Tiburon Mile with a time of 21:07, and claimed the $10,000 prize. Thompson took the lead after the first 300 meters, but began increasing his lead at the halfway point, until he led by around 20 meters.

In 2017, he captured his second consecutive 10 km marathon swim with a time of 2:11.16, having previously won the event with a 2:06.14 in 2016.

Perhaps most notably, Thompson won the 2016 Might Mac Swim, a four mile race from Mackinaw City across the Straits of Mackinac, Michigan sanctioned by the World Open Water Swimming Series. The course usually follows the Mackinac Bridge from Michigan's Lower Peninsula, heading North to the Upper Peninsula. Despite the ever present chop, waves, cold and current typical for the Strait, Thompson completed the September 5, 2016 race, with a first place time of 1:44:16.4, and collected the $20,000 winner's prize. The current and cold water held the number of participants to around 30.

On August 11, 2019, he again placed first at the Mighty Mac Swim with a time of 1:30:26.4 and collected the prize, averaging 22 minutes and 23 seconds per mile. The 2019 swim attracted more participants with 312 finishers out of 359 starters, as it was held in 68 degree water, having been moved to August

=== Post-swimming careers and coaching ===
In 2002, he began coaching as an Assistant with Ann Arbor's Club Wolverine associated with the University of Michigan. From 2008-2011, he coached swimming technique to the Navy Seal Recruits at Chicago's Great Lakes Naval Base as part of the Naval Special Warfare Preparatory School. While at Great Lakes, he lived outside Chicago with spouse Lindsey Smith an All American swimmer nine times at Michigan. Returning to Michigan, he has coached the Plymouth Canton Cruisers swim team in Plymouth, Michigan since 2011, and has conducted Open Water swim clinics. He has continued to coach the Cruisers at least part-time through 2016, and in 2015 worked for the material supply chain group of Roush Industries, providing Ford vehicle upgrades and upgrade kits.

== See also ==
- List of Olympic medalists in swimming (men)
- List of University of Michigan alumni
