= Christian Minotti =

Italian swimmer (born 1980)

Medal record

Representing Italy

Men's swimming

World Championships (SC)
Bronze medal – third place	2002 Moscow	1500 m freestyle

European Championships (LC)
Silver medal – second place	2002 Berlin	1500 m freestyle

European Championships (SC)
Bronze medal – third place	2002 Riesa	1500 m freestyle

Christian Minotti (born 12 May 1980 in Rome) is a long-distance freestyle swimmer from Italy, who won the silver medal in the men's individual 1500 metres freestyle event at the 2002 European Championships in Berlin, Germany. He represented his native country at two consecutive Summer Olympics, starting in 2000.

== See also ==
- Olympic athletes of Italy
