= Dieung Manggang =

Malaysian swimmer (born 1981)

Personal information
- Full name: Dieung Anak Manggang
- National team: Malaysia
- Born: 11 April 1981 (age 45)
- Height: 1.70 m (5 ft 7 in)
- Weight: 65 kg (143 lb)

Sport
- Sport: Swimming
- Strokes: Freestyle, butterfly
Medal record
Men's swimming
Representing Malaysia
Southeast Asian Games
Gold medal – first place	1999 Brunei	400 m freestyle
Gold medal – first place	1999 Brunei	1500 m freestyle
Bronze medal – third place	2001 Kuala Lumpur	400 m freestyle
Bronze medal – third place	2001 Kuala Lumpur	1500 m freestyle
Bronze medal – third place	2001 Kuala Lumpur	200 m butterfly

Dieung Anak Manggang (born 11 April 1981) is a Malaysian former swimmer, who specialised in long-distance freestyle and in butterfly events. He is a single-time Olympian (2000), and a multiple-time SEA Games medalist (1999 and 2001).

At the 1999 Southeast Asian Games in Bandar Seri Begawan, Brunei, Manggang powered home with two gold medals each in the 400 m freestyle (4:00.34) and 1500 m freestyle (15:57.47).

Manggang competed in a long-distance freestyle double at the 2000 Summer Olympics in Sydney. After claiming two titles from the SEA Games, his entry times of 4:00.34 (400 m freestyle) and 15:57.47 (1500 m freestyle) were accredited under a FINA B-standard. On the first day of the Games, Manggang placed forty-third in the 400 m freestyle. Swimming in heat two, he rounded out the field to last place in 4:03.77, more than three seconds off his entry time. Nearly a week later, in the 1500 m freestyle, Manggang challenged five other swimmers in the same heat, including 18-year-old Jonathan Duncan of New Zealand. He held off Duncan by more than half the body length to take a third spot and thirty-sixth overall in a time of 16:02.11.

When his nation Malaysia hosted the 2001 Southeast Asian Games in Kuala Lumpur, Manggang won a total of three bronze medals each in the 200 m butterfly (2:05.70), 400 m freestyle (4:00.12), and 1500 m freestyle (15:55.73).
