= Hsu Kuo-tung =

Taiwanese swimmer

Personal information
- Full name: Hsu Kuo-tung
- National team: Chinese Taipei
- Born: 22 September 1983 (age 42) Taipei, Taiwan
- Height: 1.73 m (5 ft 8 in)
- Weight: 68 kg (150 lb)

Sport
- Sport: Swimming
- Strokes: Individual medley

Hsu Kuo-tung (Chinese: 徐國棟; pinyin: Xú Guódòng; born September 22, 1983) is a Taiwanese former swimmer, who specialized in individual medley events. Hsu competed only in the men's 400 m individual medley at the 2000 Summer Olympics in Sydney. He achieved a FINA B-cut of 4:35.33 from the National University Games in Taipei. He challenged four other swimmers in heat one, including Hong Kong's Alex Fong, who turned out into one of city's popular singers, and Tunisia's 16-year-old Oussama Mellouli, who later became an Olympic champion in long-distance freestyle (2008) and open water (2012). He opened up his race to register a fourth-place time of 4:42.78, finishing behind Mellouli by almost a full second, and Fong, the winner of his heat, by more than 13 seconds. Hsu failed to reach the top 8 final, as he placed forty-fourth overall in the prelims.
