= Grant Hackett =

Australian swimmer (born 1980)

Grant Hackett OAM
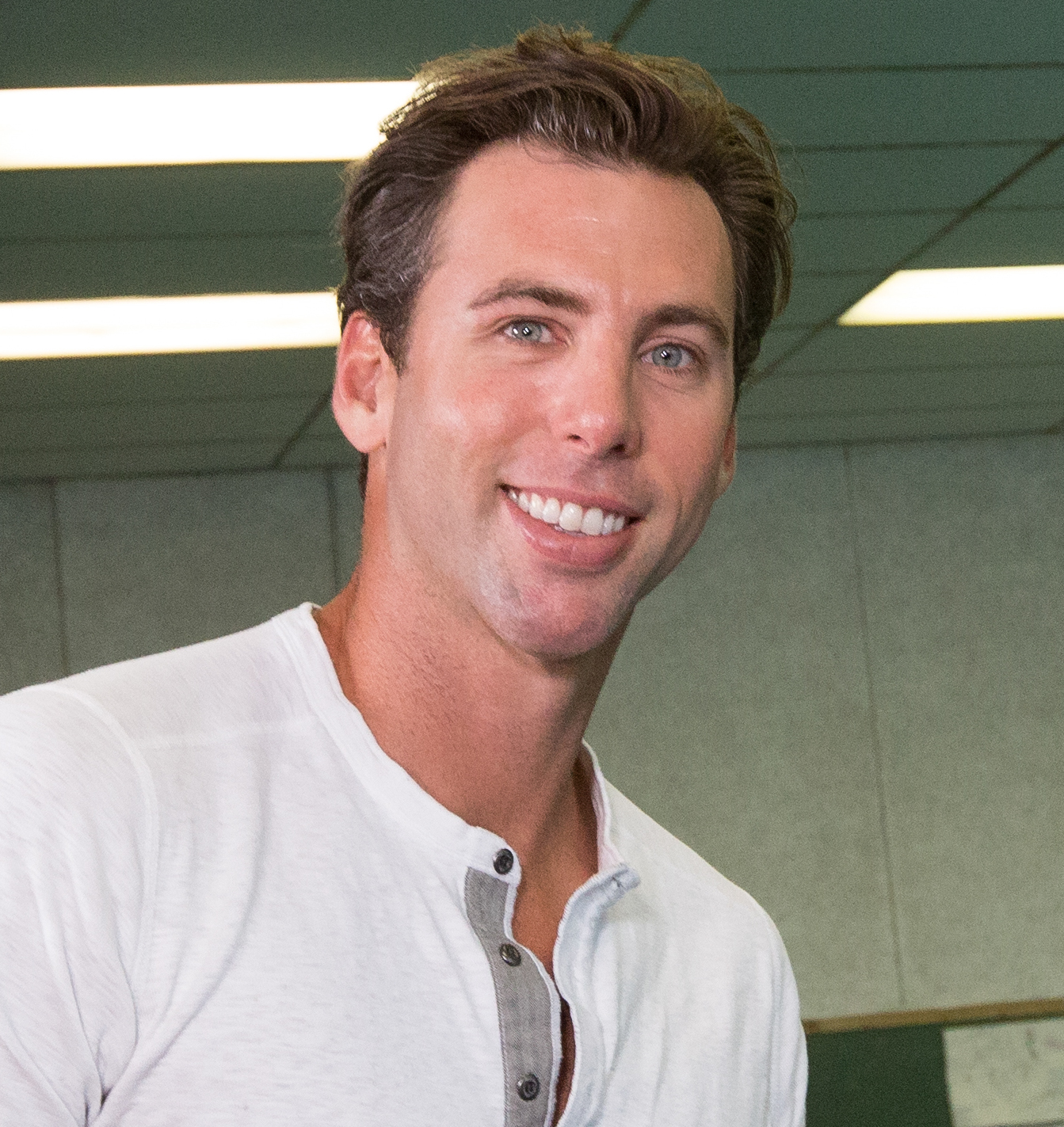

Personal information
- Full name: Grant Hackett
- National team: Australia
- Born: 9 May 1980 (age 46) Southport, Queensland, Australia
- Height: 1.97 m (6 ft 6 in)
- Weight: 96 kg (212 lb)

Sport
- Sport: Swimming
- Strokes: Freestyle
- Club: Miami Swimming Club, Gold Coast Canoe, Melbourne Vicentre
Medal record
Men's swimming
Representing Australia
Event	1st	2nd	3rd
Olympic Games	3	3	1
World Championships (LC)	10	6	3
World Championships (SC)	7	0	1
Pan Pacific Championships	9	4	0
Commonwealth Games	5	3	0
Goodwill Games	2	1	0
Total	36	17	5
Olympic Games
Gold medal – first place	2000 Sydney	1500 m freestyle
Gold medal – first place	2000 Sydney	4×200 m freestyle
Gold medal – first place	2004 Athens	1500 m freestyle
Silver medal – second place	2004 Athens	400 m freestyle
Silver medal – second place	2004 Athens	4×200 m freestyle
Silver medal – second place	2008 Beijing	1500 m freestyle
Bronze medal – third place	2008 Beijing	4×200 m freestyle
World Championships (LC)
Gold medal – first place	1998 Perth	1500 m freestyle
Gold medal – first place	1998 Perth	4×200 m freestyle
Gold medal – first place	2001 Fukuoka	1500 m freestyle
Gold medal – first place	2001 Fukuoka	4×200 m freestyle
Gold medal – first place	2003 Barcelona	800 m freestyle
Gold medal – first place	2003 Barcelona	1500 m freestyle
Gold medal – first place	2003 Barcelona	4×200 m freestyle
Gold medal – first place	2005 Montreal	400 m freestyle
Gold medal – first place	2005 Montreal	800 m freestyle
Gold medal – first place	2005 Montreal	1500 m freestyle
Silver medal – second place	1998 Perth	400 m freestyle
Silver medal – second place	2001 Fukuoka	400 m freestyle
Silver medal – second place	2001 Fukuoka	800 m freestyle
Silver medal – second place	2003 Barcelona	400 m freestyle
Silver medal – second place	2005 Montreal	200 m freestyle
Silver medal – second place	2007 Melbourne	400 m freestyle
Bronze medal – third place	2003 Barcelona	200 m freestyle
Bronze medal – third place	2005 Montreal	4×200 m freestyle
Bronze medal – third place	2015 Kazan	4×200 m freestyle
World Championships (SC)
Gold medal – first place	1997 Gothenburg	1500 m freestyle
Gold medal – first place	1997 Gothenburg	4×200 m freestyle
Gold medal – first place	1999 Hong Kong	400 m freestyle
Gold medal – first place	1999 Hong Kong	1500m freestyle
Gold medal – first place	2002 Moscow	400 m freestyle
Gold medal – first place	2002 Moscow	1500 m freestyle
Gold medal – first place	2002 Moscow	4×200 m freestyle
Bronze medal – third place	1997 Gothenburg	400 m freestyle
Goodwill Games
Gold medal – first place	2001 Brisbane	200 m freestyle
Gold medal – first place	2001 Brisbane	1500 m freestyle
Silver medal – second place	2001 Brisbane	400 m freestyle
Pan Pacific Championships
Gold medal – first place	1997 Fukuoka	400 m freestyle
Gold medal – first place	1997 Fukuoka	800 m freestyle
Gold medal – first place	1997 Fukuoka	1500 m freestyle
Gold medal – first place	1999 Sydney	1500 m freestyle
Gold medal – first place	1999 Sydney	4×200 m freestyle
Gold medal – first place	2002 Yokohama	800 m freestyle
Gold medal – first place	2002 Yokohama	1500 m freestyle
Gold medal – first place	2002 Yokohama	4×100 m freestyle
Gold medal – first place	2002 Yokohama	4×200 m freestyle
Silver medal – second place	1997 Fukuoka	4×200 m freestyle
Silver medal – second place	1999 Sydney	400 m freestyle
Silver medal – second place	2002 Yokohama	400 m freestyle
Silver medal – second place	2002 Yokohama	200 m freestyle
Commonwealth Games
Gold medal – first place	1998 Kla Lumpur	1500 m freestyle
Gold medal – first place	1998 Kla Lumpur	4×200 m freestyle
Gold medal – first place	2002 Manchester	1500 m freestyle
Gold medal – first place	2002 Manchester	4×100 m freestyle
Gold medal – first place	2002 Manchester	4×200 m freestyle
Silver medal – second place	1998 Kla Lumpur	400 m freestyle
Silver medal – second place	2002 Manchester	200 m freestyle
Silver medal – second place	2002 Manchester	400 m freestyle

Grant George Hackett OAM (born 9 May 1980) is an Australian swimmer, most famous for winning the men's 1500 metres freestyle race at both the 2000 Summer Olympics in Sydney and the 2004 Summer Olympics in Athens. This achievement has led him to be regarded as one of the greatest distance swimmers in history. He also collected a gold medal in Sydney for swimming in the heats of the 4 × 200 m freestyle relay. He was well regarded for his versatility, and has held the long course world records in the 200 m, 800 m, and 1500 m freestyle events. He dominated the 1500 m event for a decade, being undefeated in the event in finals from 1996 until the 2007 World Aquatics Championships. In total, he won 10 long-course world championship gold medals.

Hackett was the captain of the Australian swimming team from the time the role was reintroduced in 2005 until his retirement in 2008.

Hackett worked for the Nine Network, often hosting Wide World of Sports. Hackett's contract as a Westpac Banking Corporation ambassador was not renewed in February 2012 after 13 years in the role, but he remains an employee of the organisation. He is currently the Chief Executive Officer of Generation Life.

== Early life ==
Hackett was born at Southport on the Gold Coast of Queensland. He is the son of a policeman and younger brother of a Surf Lifesaving champion. Hackett's mother, Margaret, had his brother Craig six years before he was born, as she was diagnosed with cancer between the two boys' births, and was told due to the cancer she was unlikely to ever have more children, however she later fell pregnant with Grant. He attended Merrimac State High School.

== Swimming career ==
Hackett first achieved prominence on debut at the 1997 Pan Pacific Championships, where he first won the 1500 metres. He also won the 400 m freestyle, recording his only international victory over the yet-to-be-famous Ian Thorpe at the distance in international long course competition.

=== 1998 World Championships ===
During the 1998 World Championships, he again won the 1500 m but was narrowly upset by Thorpe in the 400 m. He also combined with Thorpe, Michael Klim and Daniel Kowalski to win the 4 × 200 m freestyle relay, beginning a six-year winning streak in the event over the United States.

Event	Results	Time
Men's 400m Freestyle	Silver Medal	3:46.44
Men's 1500m Freestyle	Gold Medal	14:51.70
Men's 4 × 200 m Freestyle	Gold Medal	7:12.48

These results were replicated at the 1998 Commonwealth Games in Kuala Lumpur. From 1997 to 2007 he was unbeaten in the 1500 m, winning it at every major world competition, including the World Championships, Pan Pacific Championships, Olympics, Commonwealth and Australian Championships.

In 1999, Hackett broke his first world record, unexpectedly breaking Giorgio Lamberti's 200 m freestyle world record while leading off his club relay team at the Australian Championships. That record was subsequently broken by Ian Thorpe in the same year at the 1999 Pan Pacific Championships in Sydney, although Hackett himself bettered his old mark. Hackett himself claimed the 1500 m freestyle, and combined with Thorpe, Klim and Bill Kirby to break the world record in the 4 × 200 m freestyle.

=== 2000 Summer Olympics ===
Olympic medal record

Representing Australia

2000 Sydney – Men's Swimming
Gold medal – first place	4 × 200 m freestyle relay	7 min 07.05 s (WR)
Gold medal – first place	1500 m freestyle	14 min 48.33 s

Entering the Sydney Olympics in 2000, Hackett was the overwhelming favourite in the 1500 m freestyle, and was also expected to help Thorpe take a quinella in the 200 m and 400 m events. However, due to a virus, he was well short of his best and finished eighth and seventh, respectively, in these events. He followed this with an extremely slow swim in the heats of the 4 × 200 m freestyle relay, and was dropped from the final quartet, being replaced by Todd Pearson. By the time the final of the 1500 m freestyle came, Hackett had qualified third behind sentimental favourite Kieren Perkins, who was being vocally cheered by the crowd. In the face of the immense pressure, Hackett adopted a more attacking, fast-starting approach, and managed to hang on to claim gold.

=== 2001 World Championships ===
At the 2001 World Championships in Fukuoka, Hackett was in the peak of his speed. He set personal bests in the 200 m, 400 m 800 m and 1500 m freestyle events, finishing second to Thorpe in both 400 m and 800m, and bettering the 800 m world record in the latter. Along with Thorpe, Klim and Kirby, they bettered the previous world record in the 4 × 200 m freestyle. In the 1500 m, Hackett attacked immediately, and stayed well ahead of Perkins' world record, and with the crowd standing and willing him on, he broke the record by 7 seconds, to claim gold.

Event	Results	Time	
Men's 400m Freestyle	Silver Medal	3:42.51	
Men's 800m Freestyle	Silver Medal	7:40.34	
Men's 1500m Freestyle	Gold Medal	14:34.56	WR
Men's 4 × 200 m Freestyle	Gold Medal	7:04.66	WR

=== 2003 World Championships ===
In the 2003 World Championships in Barcelona, Hackett picked up five medals; three gold, a silver and a bronze. Despite capturing individual medals in 200, 400, 800 and 1500 freestyle events for the first time in an international meet, Hackett failed to break any personal best times.

Event	Results	Time
Men's 200m Freestyle	Bronze Medal	1:46.85
Men's 400m Freestyle	Silver Medal	3:45.17
Men's 800m Freestyle	Gold Medal	7:43.82
Men's 1500m Freestyle	Gold Medal	14:43.14
Men's 4 × 200 m Freestyle	Gold Medal	7:08.58

=== 2004 Summer Olympics ===
Olympic medal record

Representing Australia

2004 Athens – Men's Swimming
Silver medal – second place	400 m freestyle	3 min 43.36 s
Silver medal – second place	4 × 200 m freestyle relay	7 min 07.46 s
Gold medal – first place	1500 m freestyle	14 min 43.40 s

At 196 cm (six foot five) and 89.8 kg (198 pounds), Hackett won the gruelling 1500 metres race by sheer physical strength and stamina. He showed this in Sydney when he won despite having only partly recovered from illness, and again in Athens, when he survived challenges from swimmers (Larsen Jensen and David Davies) both six years his junior to hang on to win the race, despite a partially collapsed lung. This came after a solid swim in the 400 m to claim silver behind Thorpe, and a lackluster performance in the individual 200 m, followed by an unconvincing swim in the lead-off leg of the 4 × 200 m relay, when he was 1.66 seconds off his best. His sluggish heat swim placed him third, raising concerns within the Australian camp. After the Olympics, it was revealed that one of his lungs was partially collapsed, leaving his total lung capacity diminished by 25%.

=== 2005 World Championships ===
In 2005, Swimming Australia introduced the concept of a captain for the swimming team. Hackett was awarded this honour, and led Australia in the World Championships at Montreal, Quebec, Canada. He won gold medals in the 400 m, 800 m and 1500 m freestyle (as well as silver in the 200 m freestyle), the first person to achieve this feat, along with the only swimmer to medal in four distances in a single world championships. His victory in the 800 m event broke Thorpe's world record, and his 1500 m victory saw him become the first to win an event four times at a World Championships. He anchored the 4 × 200 m team to bronze with a split of 1:44.84, making him the second fastest performer in relay splits. He was named as FINA's Male swimmer of the meet.

Event	Results	Time	
Men's 200m Freestyle	Silver Medal	1:46.14	
Men's 400m Freestyle	Gold Medal	3:42.91	
Men's 800m Freestyle	Gold Medal	7:38.65	WR
Men's 1500m Freestyle	Gold Medal	14:42.58	
Men's 4 × 200 m Freestyle	Bronze Medal	7:10.59	

In November 2005, Hackett announced his withdrawal from the 2006 Commonwealth Games due to being unavailable for the selection trials because of a minor surgery to correct a shoulder injury. However, he was given dispensation to act as a non-competing captain in order to mentor the fellow swimmers in the lead-up to the competition.

In late 2006, Hackett relocated to Melbourne for personal reasons. He attributed his disrupted preparation to adjusting with his new regime. Prior to the 2007 World Aquatics Championships, he presented a pessimistic outlook of his prospects.

=== 2007 World Championships ===
He qualified last in the 400 m event, but led in the final before fading in the last lap to take the bronze medal. He qualified fifth in the 800 m event, but finished seventh, more than ten seconds behind the winner. In the 1500 m final Hackett came seventh, ending his decade long unbeaten streak in the event.

Event	Results	Time
Men's 400m Freestyle	Silver Medal	3:45.43
Men's 800m Freestyle	6th	7:55.39
Men's 1500m Freestyle	7th	14:59.59

In December 2007, Hackett competed in and won his first national championship 10 km Open Water race. By barely edging out veteran open-water swimmer and surf Ironman Ky Hurst, the pair both qualified for the World Championships in Seville, Spain. However, Hackett failed to finish in the top 10 in this event, and therefore missed out on qualifying for the 10 km open water swim at the 2008 Summer Olympics. He was also criticised for appearing to be overweight after the event, a claim that he rejected as "ridiculous".

At the 2008 Victorian Short Course Swimming Championships, his final Australian meet before departing for the Olympics, Hackett broke his own 800 metres freestyle world record – lowering the mark by almost two seconds to 7:23.42.

=== 2008 Olympics ===
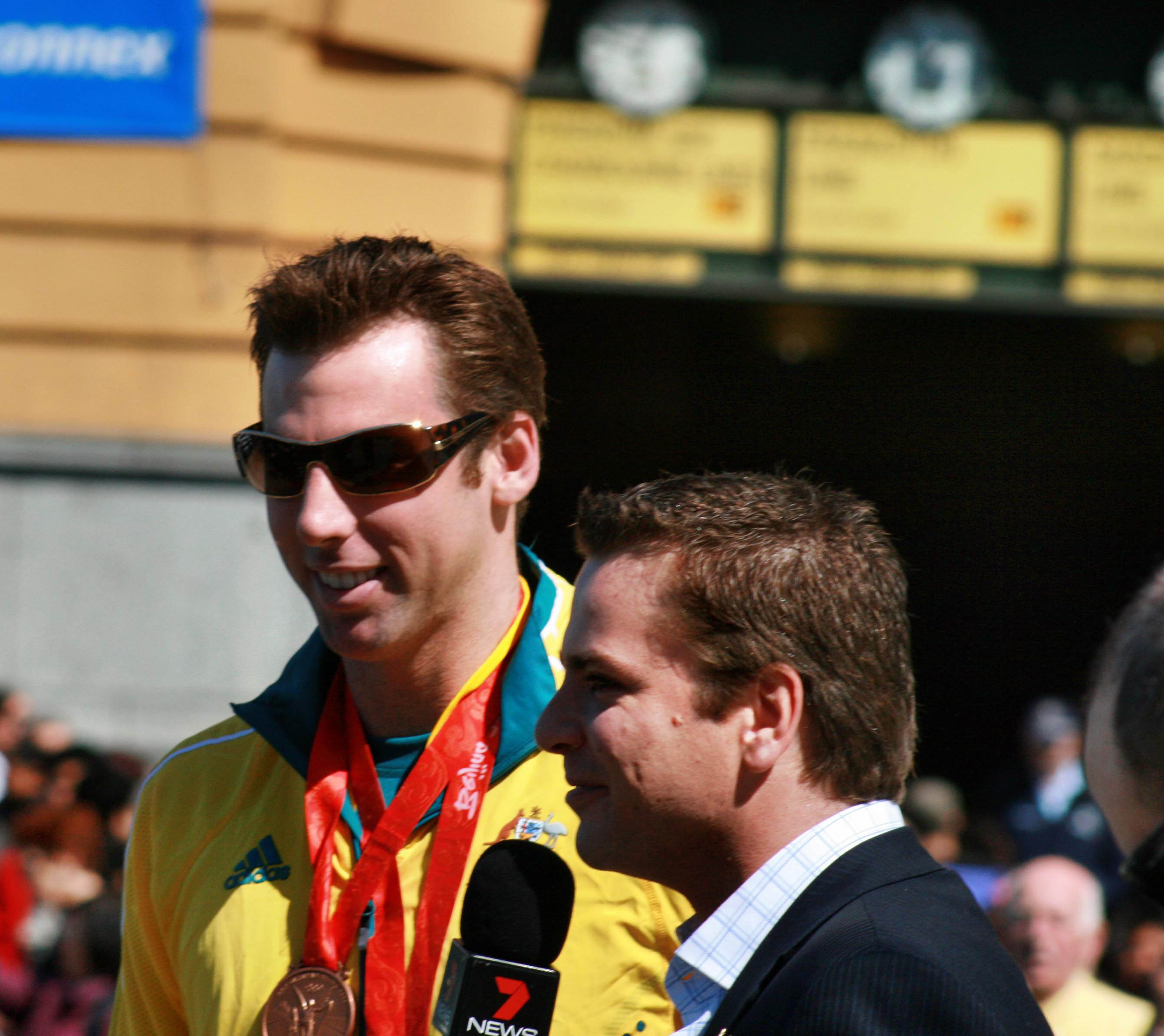
Hackett (left) at the Melbourne homecoming parade for 2008 Olympic Team

Though Hackett failed to qualify for the 10,000m; he succeeded in other events. He swam the 400m and 1500m freestyle and the 4 × 200 m freestyle relay. In the 1500m he finished second, winning the silver medal behind Tunisian Oussama Mellouli. Had he won, he would have been the first male swimmer to win three successive Olympic titles in the same event, an opportunity denied to two-time Olympic 1500m champion Vladimir Salnikov due to the 1984 Summer Olympics communist boycott. Hackett won the individual 200m freestyle swim at the Olympic trials but as he was not seeking a berth in the event he handed his spot in the Olympic competition in this event to the third-place finisher at the trials, Nicholas Sprenger.

Event	Results	Time
Men's 400m Freestyle	6th	3:43.84
Men's 1500m Freestyle	Silver Medal	14:41.53
Men's 4 × 200 m Freestyle	Bronze Medal	7:04.98

=== 2015 World Championships Comeback ===
After six and half years since racing a major competition and after six months of training under his belt. At the Australian Championships, Hackett finished fourth in the 200m freestyle, qualifying for the 4 × 200 m freestyle relay for the 2015 World Aquatics Championships. He also won a bronze medal in the 400m freestyle. At the 2015 World Championships in Kazan, he won a bronze medal for swimming in the heats of the 4 × 200 m freestyle relay, thereby winning his first international medal since the 2008 Olympics.

== Career best times ==
=== Long course (50 m) ===
As of 4 December 2025

Event	Time	Meet	Location	Date	Notes
200 m freestyle	1:45.61	Australian Championships	Sydney, Australia	26 March 2004	
400 m freestyle	3:42.51	World Championships	Fukuoka, Japan	22 July 2001	
800 m freestyle	7:38.65	World Championships	Montreal, Canada	27 July 2005	^{[A]}
1500 m freestyle	14:34.56	World Championships	Fukuoka, Japan	29 July 2001	CR^{[A]}

Legend: WR – World record; OC – Oceanian record; CR – Commonwealth record; NR – Australian record; e – equalled existing record;
Records not set in finals: h – heat; sf – semifinal; r – relay 1st leg; rh – relay heat 1st leg; b – B final; † – en route to final mark; so – swim-off; tt – time trial

=== Short course (25 m) ===
As of 4 December 2025

Event	Time	Meet	Location	Date	Notes
200 m freestyle	1:42.48	World Cup	Melbourne, Australia	7 December 2002	
400 m freestyle	3:34.58	Swimming Australia Grand Prix	Sydney, Australia	18 July 2002	OC^{[A]}
800 m freestyle	7:23.42	Victorian Championships	Melbourne, Australia	20 July 2008	CR^{[A]}
1500 m freestyle	14:10.10	Australian Championships	Perth, Australia	7 August 2001	CR^{[A]}

Legend: WR – World record; OC – Oceanian record; CR – Commonwealth record; NR – Australian record; e – equalled existing record;
Records not set in finals: h – heat; sf – semifinal; r – relay 1st leg; rh – relay heat 1st leg; b – B final; † – en route to final mark; so – swim-off; tt – time trial

=== Notes ===
1. Former World record.

== World records ==
=== Long course (50 m) ===
No.	Event	Time	Meet	Location	Date	Status	Ref
1	200 m freestyle	1:46.67 (r)	Australian Championships	Brisbane, Australia	23 March 1999	Former	
2	4×200 m freestyle relay^{[A]}	7:08.79	Pan Pacific Championships	Sydney, Australia	25 August 1999	Former	
3	4×200 m freestyle relay (2)^{[B]}	7:04.66	World Championships	Fukuoka, Japan	27 July 2001	Former	
4	1500 m freestyle	14:34.56	World Championships	Fukuoka, Japan	29 July 2001	Former	
5	800 m freestyle	7:38.65	World Championships	Montreal, Canada	27 July 2005	Former	

=== Short course (25 m) ===
No.	Event	Time	Meet	Location	Date	Status	Ref
1	4×200 m freestyle relay^{[C]}	7:02.74	World Championships	Gothenburg, Sweden	18 April 1997	Former	
2	1500 m freestyle	14:19.55	Australian Championships	Perth, Australia	27 September 1998	Former	
3	400 m freestyle	3:35.01	World Championships	Hong Kong	2 April 1999	Former	
4	800 m freestyle	7:25.28	Australian Championships	Perth, Australia	3 August 2001	Former	
5	1500 m freestyle (2)	14:10.10	Australian Championships	Perth, Australia	7 August 2001	Former	
6	4×200 m freestyle relay (2)^{[D]}	6:56.41	Australian Championships	Perth, Australia	7 August 2001	Former	
7	400 m freestyle (2)	3:34.58	Swimming Australia Grand Prix	Sydney, Australia	18 July 2002	Former	
8	4×200 m freestyle relay (3)^{[E]}	6:52.66	Australian Championships	Melbourne, Australia	31 August 2007	Former	
9	800 m freestyle (2)	7:23.42	Victorian Championships	Melbourne, Australia	20 July 2008	Former	

=== Notes ===
1. Split 1:46.30 (3rd leg); with Ian Thorpe (1st leg), Bill Kirby (2nd leg), Michael Klim (4th leg).
2. Split 1:46.11 (1st leg); with Michael Klim (2nd leg), Bill Kirby (3rd leg), Ian Thorpe (4th leg).
3. Split 1:45.61 (2nd leg); with Michael Klim (1st leg), Bill Kirby (3rd leg), Matthew Dunn (4th leg).
4. Split 1:43.26 (4th leg); with Bill Kirby (1st leg), Ian Thorpe (2nd leg), Michael Klim (3rd leg).
5. Split 1:42.75 (2nd leg); with Kirk Palmer (1st leg), Grant Brits (3rd leg), Kenrick Monk (4th leg).

== Media career ==
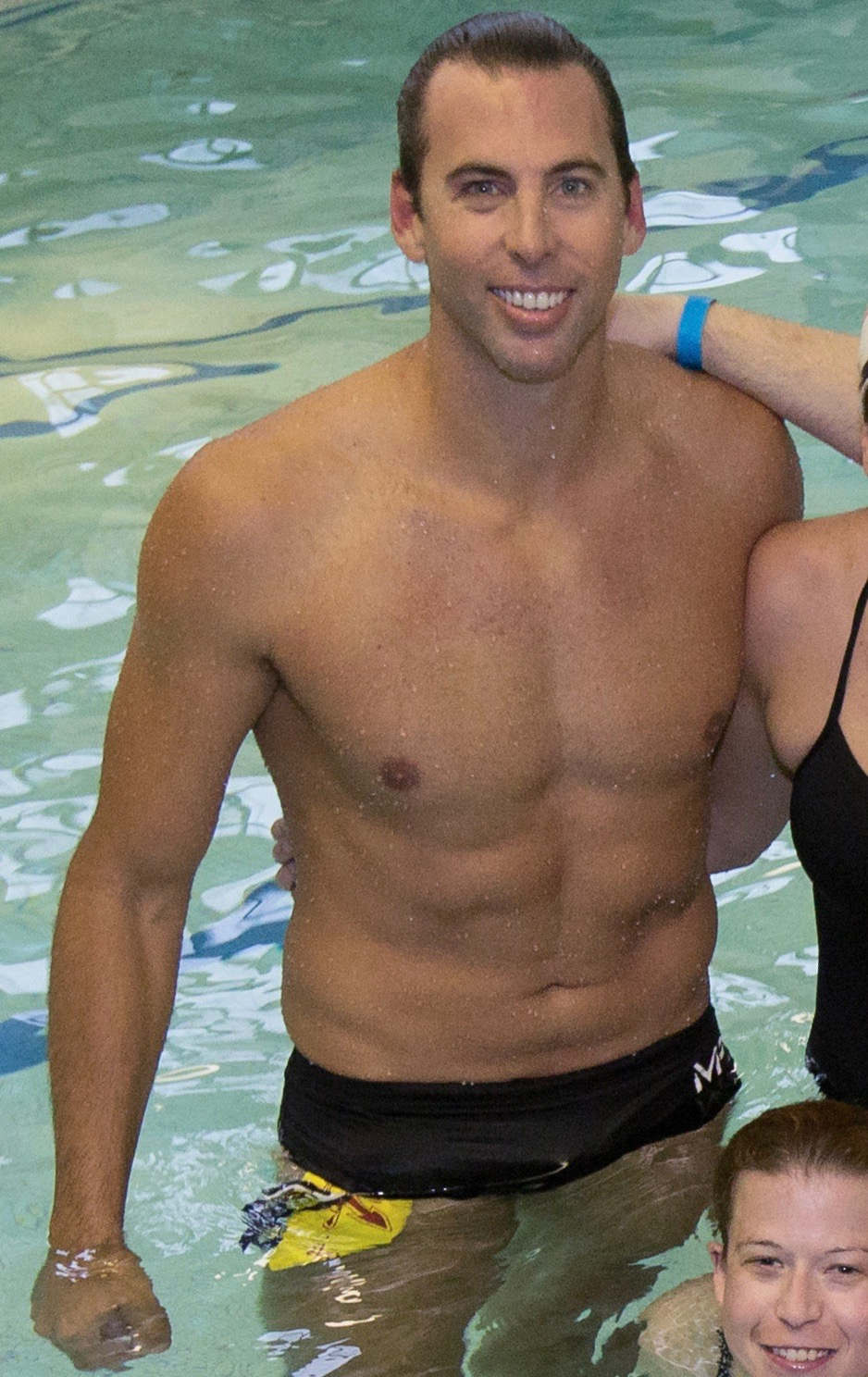
Hackett in May 2017

Hackett is currently contracted to the Nine Network, having previously worked with the Seven Network.

In October 2008, Hackett joined Nine News Melbourne as the weekend sport presenter, replacing Heath O'Loughlin. However, in November 2009, Nine announced that Hackett would no longer continue as weekend sports presenter, but would continue with the network in other capacities.

Hackett was an expert commentator for Amazon Prime Video for the 2021 Swimming Australia Olympic Trials and the 2022 Australian Swimming Championships.

== Personal life ==
Hackett holds a double degree in commerce and law, and an executive MBA from Bond University.

On 14 April 2007, Hackett married Australian singer Candice Alley. In March 2009, Hackett announced that his wife was expecting twins and in September she gave birth to a son named Jagger Emilio and a girl named Charlize Alley. On 3 May 2012, Alley and Hackett announced that they were separating. They divorced in August 2013.

In December 2020, Hackett married his partner Sharlene Fletcher. They have a son Edward together. In August 2023, they had their second child together – a daughter, Olympia. He is an advocate for Mental Health.

== Controversies ==
On 29 October 2011, police were called to attend a dispute at Hackett and Alley's Melbourne apartment, which was reportedly found in disarray.

Hackett was questioned by police for an alleged assault during a flight from Adelaide to Melbourne on 17 April 2016. Police sources say that he "went to the toilet for an extended period, taking a bag with him. He emerged aggressive and agitated, taking offence to a male business class passenger who reclined his seat". He reportedly abused and grabbed the passenger on the chest before crew restrained him and contacted Federal Police. The victim alleged he was sexually assaulted, accusing Hackett of groping him. The man alleged that Hackett "tweaked my nipple quite forcefully." Hackett said he had no recollection of touching the man's nipple, and said that the incident followed a period of heavy drinking. Hackett said he "stuffed up" and was embarrassed by his actions. The victim chose not to press charges after receiving a personal apology.

On 15 February 2017 Hackett was arrested following a disturbance at his parents' house on Queensland's Gold Coast. Hackett had previously admitted a reliance on sleeping pills and had been battling mental health issues. Later that same day, his parents reported him missing from home, but before he was reported missing, Hackett posted a photo of himself on Instagram with cuts and bruises to his face and said his brother had beaten him. Hackett was subsequently found safe.

== Honours ==
Hackett received an Australian Sports Medal in 2000, and both a Centenary Medal and a Medal of the Order of Australia in 2001, the latter for his 2000 gold medal win.

== Awards ==
In 2004 he was granted the "Key to the City of Gold Coast" in recognition of his outstanding achievement as a swimming champion. He was named as the Australian Swimmer of the Year in 2005, and was also named the World Swimmer of the Year by Swimming World magazine. In 2009 as part of the Q150 celebrations, Grant Hackett was announced as one of the Q150 Icons of Queensland for his role as a "sports legend". In 2010 he was inducted into the Sport Australia Hall of Fame, and the International Swimming Hall of Fame in 2014.

== See also ==
- List of Commonwealth Games medallists in swimming (men)
- List of Olympic medalists in swimming (men)
- World record progression 200 metres freestyle
- World record progression 400 metres freestyle
- World record progression 800 metres freestyle
- World record progression 1500 metres freestyle
- World record progression 4 × 200 metres freestyle relay

Records
Preceded by Giorgio Lamberti	Men's 200 metre freestyle world record holder (long course); 23 March 1999 – 23 August 1999	Succeeded by Ian Thorpe
Preceded by Ian Thorpe	Men's 800 metre freestyle world record holder (long course); 27 July 2005 – 29 July 2009	Succeeded by Zhang Lin
Preceded by Kieren Perkins	Men's 1500 metre freestyle world record holder (long course); 30 July 2001 – 31 July 2011	Succeeded by Sun Yang
Preceded by Kieren Perkins	Men's 800 metre freestyle world record holder (short course); 21 Aug 2001 – 10 Dec 2023	Succeeded by Daniel Wiffen
Preceded by Kieren Perkins	Men's 1500 metre freestyle world record holder (short course); 27 Sep 1998 – 4 Dec 2015	Succeeded by Gregorio Paltrinieri
Awards
Preceded by Michael Phelps	Swimming World; World Swimmer of the Year; 2005	Succeeded by Michael Phelps
Preceded by Ian Thorpe	Pacific Rim Swimmer of the Year; 2005	Succeeded by Park Tae-hwan
Media offices
Preceded by Heath O'Loughlin	Nine News Melbourne; Weekend sport presenter 18 October 2008 – November 2009	Succeeded by Lisa Andrews
