= Alexey Filipets =

Russian swimmer

Personal information
- Born: 18 August 1978 (age 47) Novocherkassk, Russia
- Height: 1.78 m (5 ft 10 in)
- Weight: 71 kg (157 lb)

Sport
- Sport: Swimming
- Club: Dynamo Novocherkassk
Medal record
Representing Russia
World Championships (LC)
Bronze medal – third place	2001 Fukuoka	1500 m freestyle
European Championships (SC)
Silver medal – second place	2001 Antwerp	1500 m freestyle

Aleksey Vladimirovich Filipets (Russian: Алексей Владимирович Филипец; born 18 August 1978) is a retired Russian swimmer. He specialized in the 1500 m freestyle, in which he won a bronze medal at the 2001 World Aquatics Championships and a silver medal at the European Short Course Swimming Championships 2001. He finished fourth and 19th in the same event at the 2000 and 2004 Summer Olympics, respectively.

He graduated from the Kuban State University of Physical Education, Sport and Tourism in Krasnodar.
