= Kieren Perkins =

Australian swimmer (born 1973)

Kieren Perkins OAM
Personal information
- Full name: Kieren John Perkins
- National team: Australia
- Born: 14 August 1973 (age 53) Brisbane, Queensland, Australia
- Height: 1.94 m (6 ft 4 in)
- Weight: 90 kg (198 lb)

Sport
- Sport: Swimming
- Strokes: Freestyle
- Club: Commercial Swimming Club
Medal record
Men's swimming
Representing Australia
Olympic Games
Gold medal – first place	1992 Barcelona	1500 m freestyle
Gold medal – first place	1996 Atlanta	1500 m freestyle
Silver medal – second place	1992 Barcelona	400 m freestyle
Silver medal – second place	2000 Sydney	1500 m freestyle
World Championships (LC)
Gold medal – first place	1994 Rome	400 m freestyle
Gold medal – first place	1994 Rome	1500 m freestyle
Silver medal – second place	1991 Perth	1500 m freestyle
Pan Pacific Championships
Gold medal – first place	1991 Edmonton	400 m freestyle
Gold medal – first place	1991 Edmonton	800 m freestyle
Gold medal – first place	1991 Edmonton	1500 m freestyle
Gold medal – first place	1993 Kobe	400 m freestyle
Gold medal – first place	1993 Kobe	800 m freestyle
Gold medal – first place	1993 Kobe	1500 m freestyle
Gold medal – first place	1995 Atlanta	1500 m freestyle
Silver medal – second place	1995 Atlanta	800 m freestyle
Silver medal – second place	1991 Edmonton	4×200 m freestyle
Silver medal – second place	1993 Kobe	4×200 m freestyle
Commonwealth Games
Gold medal – first place	1994 Victoria	200 m freestyle
Gold medal – first place	1994 Victoria	400 m freestyle
Gold medal – first place	1994 Victoria	1500 m freestyle
Gold medal – first place	1994 Victoria	4×200 m freestyle
Silver medal – second place	1990 Auckland	1500 m freestyle
Bronze medal – third place	1998 Kuala Lumpur	1500 m freestyle

Kieren John Perkins (born 14 August 1973) is an Australian former freestyle swimmer. He specialised in the 1500-metre freestyle and won successive Olympic gold medals in this event in the 1990s. He won his first at the 1992 Olympics which he won in world record time and then at the 1996 Olympics when he defended his title. In total he won four Olympic medals.

== Early life ==
Perkins was born in Brisbane, Queensland. He attended Indooroopilly State Primary School and graduated from Brisbane Boys' College in the inner city suburb of Toowong. He began swimming regularly at age eight as part of his rehabilitation from a serious leg injury incurred after running through a plate glass window. At age 13 his potential became obvious, and with coach John Carew guiding him he won his first medal at the Australian Championships in Melbourne in 1989.

== Early international career (1990–1992) ==
=== 1990 Commonwealth Games ===
Perkins's first major international meet was the 1990 Commonwealth Games in Auckland, New Zealand. Perkins won the silver medal in the 1500-metre freestyle behind fellow Queenslander Glen Housman. Both Housman (14:55.25) and Perkins (14:58.08) broke 15 minutes which was the first time Perkins had recorded a sub-fifteen-minute 1500 metres.

=== 1991 World Championships ===
There was much expectation around Perkins at the 1991 World Aquatics Championships in Perth in the 1500 m freestyle, but he was beaten in the final by just 0.22 seconds by German Jörg Hoffmann who set a new world-record time. Perkins swam 14:50.58, which was also far under the previous world record.

=== 1992 Olympic Games ===
Perkins was favourite for the men's 1500-metre freestyle at the 1992 Summer Olympics in Barcelona, Spain. The fastest qualifier for the final, Perkins broke his own world record by 5 seconds to 14:43.48. This was the only gold medal won by an Australian swimmer at these Games.

Earlier in the meet, Perkins finished second in the 400 m final. Russian Yevgeny Sadovyi representing the Unified Team won the race in a world record time. Perkins also broke the world record as he finished 0.16 behind.

Perkins was the Australian flag bearer at the closing ceremony.

== Peak international career (1993–1996) ==
=== 1994 Commonwealth Games ===
At the 1994 Commonwealth Games in Victoria, British Columbia, Canada, Perkins won four gold medals in the 200 m, 400 m, 1500 m and 4 x 200 m freestyle relay all in world record time.

=== 1994 World Championships ===
Two weeks after the Commonwealth Games, Perkins competed in the 1994 World Aquatics Championships in Rome. He won two gold medals in the 400 m and 1500 m, the 400 m in World Record time. His 400 m and 1500 m world records made that year stood until 1999 and 2001 respectively, broken by fellow Australians Ian Thorpe and Grant Hackett. His performances in that year earned him the Male World Swimmer of the Year award from Swimming World magazine. He later described the Olympic Pool in Rome as his favourite pool.

=== 1996 Olympic Games ===
At the time of the 1996 Summer Olympics in Atlanta, Perkins was out of form and long-time Australian rival Daniel Kowalski was regarded as the favourite. In fact his form was so poor that he almost failed to make the Australian team. Perkins qualified for the 1500-metre freestyle final by a mere 0.24 seconds to be the slowest of the top 8 qualifiers, and it was later revealed that before the race he felt unwell and considered not swimming. From lane eight, Perkins dominated the race being the only swimmer to go under 15 minutes (14:56.40), again relegating Kowalski, who had to fight all the way and just held off Graeme Smith. Perkins became just the third swimmer to win consecutive gold medals in this event. He became the only Australian since Dawn Fraser to defend an individual Olympic championship successfully in Olympics held outside Australia.

== Era of Dominance Over (1998–2000) ==
=== 1998 Commonwealth Games ===
Perkins carried the flag at the opening ceremony for the 1998 Commonwealth Games held in Kuala Lumpur. In the 1500 m freestyle, he won bronze behind 18 year old heir apparent Grant Hackett and Ryk Neethling.

=== 2000 Olympic Games ===
Perkins was in Monte Carlo in 1993 the night Sydney won the right to host the games and managed to qualify for his 3rd Olympic Games. Despite being just 27, he was now the elder statesman of the team. It was a reverse of four years earlier where Perkins was the fastest qualifier heading into the final, but Grant Hackett won gold with Perkins winning silver. Perkins joined Frank Beaurepaire as one of two swimmers to win three medals in this event.

== Legacy ==
With the nickname of Super Fish, Perkins retired from swimming in 2000, at age 27, having amassed 23 medals at international competitions. He set 11 world records, holding the 1500 m freestyle record for nine years, the 800 m for ten years and the 400 m freestyle for five years.

He is the first person in history to hold the Olympic, World, Commonwealth and Pan Pacific titles simultaneously.

He broke over 40 Australian records during a career spanning from 1989 to 2000.

Perkins won two of the 16 gold medals Australia won at the 1992 and 1996 Olympic Games. He was one of 6 Australians to win gold medals at both of these Games. Perkins won 2 of the 3 swimming gold Australia won during this time. There was a mythology in Australia with the 1500 m freestyle that Perkins revived and brought into modern times. Australian swimmers won Olympic gold in the 1500 m from 1956 to 1964 but nothing for 28 years until Perkins broke the drought. In fact, Australia has won the event more times than any other nation.

== Honours ==
In the Australia Day Honours of 1993, Perkins was awarded the Medal of the Order of Australia (OAM).

== Awards ==
Perkins was named 1992 Young Australian of the Year. Also named an Australian Living Treasure, he was inducted into the Sport Australia Hall of Fame in 2002. In 2009 Perkins was inducted into the Queensland Sport Hall of Fame. Also in 2009 as part of the Q150 celebrations, Kieren Perkins was announced as one of the Q150 Icons of Queensland for his role as a "sports legend". Perkins was awarded an honorary degree by the University of Queensland.

== Post-swimming career ==
Since his retirement, he claims to have not even recreationally swum due to a bad back. Professionally, he has occasionally worked in the broadcast media. He joined National Australia Bank in 2009. Perkins was part of the team that conducted a review of the Australian swimming team at the 2012 Olympics. In November 2020, Perkins was appointed as President of Swimming Australia. He was a director of the Starlight Foundation.

On 17 December 2021, Perkins was named the new CEO of the Australian Sports Commission and the Australian Institute of Sport. Perkins is an outspoken critic of the so-called "Enhanced Games", an Olympic-style sports competition that would permit doping, saying in March 2024 at a SportNXT conference in Melbourne: "Someone will die if we allow that sort of environment to continue to foster and flourish."

== Personal life ==
Perkins married in 1997 and has three children with ex-wife Symantha. In June 2012, Perkins announced that he and Symantha had separated. In October 2014, Perkins married Karen Davis in Positano, Italy.

== See also ==
- List of members of the International Swimming Hall of Fame
- Commonwealth Games records in swimming
- List of Commonwealth Games medallists in swimming (men)
- List of Olympic medalists in swimming (men)
- World record progression 400 metres freestyle
- World record progression 800 metres freestyle
- World record progression 1500 metres freestyle

Records
Preceded by Vladimir Salnikov	Men's 800 metres freestyle world record holder (long course); 5 August 1991 – 26 March 2001	Succeeded by Ian Thorpe
Preceded by Uwe Dassler	Men's 400 metres freestyle world record holder (long course); 3 April 1992 – 29 July 1992	Succeeded by Yevgeny Sadovyi
Preceded by Jörg Hoffmann	Men's 1500 metres freestyle world record holder (long course); 5 April 1992 – 29 July 2001	Succeeded by Grant Hackett
Preceded by Yevgeny Sadovyi	Men's 400 metres freestyle world record holder (long course); 11 September 1994 – 22 August 1999	Succeeded by Ian Thorpe
Awards and achievements
Preceded by Károly Güttler	World Swimmer of the Year; 1994	Succeeded by Denis Pankratov
