= Ihor Chervynskyy =

Ukrainian swimmer

Personal information
- Full name: Ігор Червинський
- Nationality: Ukraine
- Born: 16 December 1981 (age 44) Kharkiv, Ukrainian SSR, Soviet Union
- Height: 180 cm (5 ft 11 in)
- Weight: 66 kg (146 lb)

Sport
- Sport: Swimming
- Strokes: Freestyle
Medal record
World Championships (LC)
Silver medal – second place	2003 Barcelona	1500 m freestlye
Bronze medal – third place	2003 Barcelona	800 m freestlye
European LC Championships
Gold medal – first place	2000 Helsinki	1500 m freestyle
Silver medal – second place	2004 Madrid	1500 m freestyle
Bronze medal – third place	2002 Berlin	1500 m freestyle
World Championships (SC)
Silver medal – second place	2000 Athens	1500 m freestyle
European Championships (SC)
Gold medal – first place	1999 Lisbon	1500 m freestyle
Bronze medal – third place	2000 Valencia	1500 m freestyle
Summer Universiade
Silver medal – second place	2003 Daegu	800 m freestyle
Silver medal – second place	2003 Daegu	1500 m freestyle
Bronze medal – third place	2005 Izmir	1500 m freestyle
European Junior Championships
Gold medal – first place	1998 Antwerp	1500 m freestyle
Gold medal – first place	1999 Moscow	400 m freestyle
Gold medal – first place	1999 Moscow	1500 m freestyle

Ihor Chervynskyy (Ігор Червинський, also spelled Igor Chervynskiy, born 16 December 1981) is a Ukrainian swimmer who competes in the freestyle events. At the 2003 World Aquatics Championships he won a bronze medal in the 800 metres, and a silver medal in the 1500 metres.

== Biography ==
He competed in the pool twice at the Olympics, at the 2000 Summer Games, where he finished 33rd in the men's 400m freestyle and 7th in the men's 1500m freestyle, and at the 2004 Summer Games, where he finished 10th in the men's 1500m.

Since then, he has competed in open water swimming. At the 2008 Summer Olympics, he competed in the Men's 10 km, finishing in 12th place. At the 2012 Summer Olympics, he competed in the Men's 10 km, finishing in 14th.

He was born in Kharkiv, Ukraine.
