= Andrew Hurd =

Canadian swimmer (born 1982)

Personal information
- Full name: Andrew Hurd
- National team: Canada
- Born: August 12, 1982 (age 43) Cambridge, Ontario
- Height: 1.90 m (6 ft 3 in)
- Weight: 82 kg (181 lb)

Sport
- Sport: Swimming
- Strokes: Freestyle
- Club: Mississauga Aquatic Club
- College team: University of Michigan
Medal record
Men's swimming
Representing Canada
World Championships (LC)
Silver medal – second place	2005 Montreal	4×200 m freestyle
Bronze medal – third place	2007 Melbourne	4×200 m freestyle
Pan Pacific Championships
Gold medal – first place	2006 Victoria	800 m freestyle
Silver medal – second place	2006 Victoria	4×200 m freestyle
Commonwealth Games
Silver medal – second place	2006 Melbourne	400 m freestyle
Silver medal – second place	2006 Melbourne	1500 m freestyle

Andrew Hurd (born August 12, 1982) is a Canadian former freestyle swimmer. He began swimming at age 8 and was a student at the University of Michigan. He won a gold medal on the world cup circuit in 2000 in Edmonton, Alberta in the 1500-metre freestyle event. He was born in Cambridge, Ontario.

He was a member of the Canadian team that finished in fifth place in the 4 × 200 m freestyle at the 2008 Summer Olympics in Beijing.

== See also ==
- List of Commonwealth Games medallists in swimming (men)
- List of University of Michigan alumni
