= 2006 Pan Pacific Swimming Championships – Men's 200 metre freestyle =

Men's 200 metre freestyle at the 2006 Pan Pacific Swimming Championships
- Venue: Saanich Commonwealth Place
- Dates: August 17, 2006 (heats & finals)
- Competitors: 43 from 11 nations
- Winning time: 1:46.20

Medalists
gold medal	Klete Keller	United States
silver medal	Park Tae-Hwan	South Korea
bronze medal	Zhang Lin	China

The men's 200 metre freestyle competition at the 2006 Pan Pacific Swimming Championships took place on August 17 at the Saanich Commonwealth Place. The last champion was Ian Thorpe of Australia.

This race consisted of four lengths of the pool, all in freestyle.

== Records ==
Prior to this competition, the existing world and Pan Pacific records were as follows:

World record	Ian Thorpe (AUS)	1:44.06	Fukuoka, Japan	July 25, 2001
Pan Pacific Championships record	Ian Thorpe (AUS)	1:44.75	Yokohama, Japan	August 26, 2002

== Results ==
All times are in minutes and seconds.

KEY:	q	Fastest non-qualifiers	Q	Qualified	CR	Championships record	NR	National record	PB	Personal best	SB	Seasonal best

=== Heats ===
The first round was held on August 17, at 10:20.

Rank	Heat	Lane	Name	Nationality	Time	Notes
1	5	4	Peter Vanderkaay	United States	1:47.75	QA
2	5	3	Brent Hayden	Canada	1:48.12	QA
3	6	5	Zhang Lin	China	1:48.46	QA
4	6	4	Klete Keller	United States	1:48.47	QA
5	4	5	Park Tae-Hwan	South Korea	1:48.91	QA
6	5	2	Michael Klueh	United States	1:49.04	QA
7	4	6	Brian Johns	Canada	1:49.17	QA
7	6	3	Andrew Hurd	Canada	1:49.17	QA
9	5	6	Colin Russell	Canada	1:49.34	QB
10	6	6	Kenrick Monk	Australia	1:49.44	QB
11	2	7	Leith Brodie	Australia	1:49.56	QB
11	4	4	Rick Say	Canada	1:49.56	QB
13	5	5	Nicholas Ffrost	Australia	1:49.81	QB
14	5	7	Takamitsu Kojima	Japan	1:50.15	QB
15	6	2	Yuji Sakurai	Japan	1:50.18	QB
16	4	3	Andrew Mewing	Australia	1:50.30	QB
17	1	4	Lucas Salatta	Brazil	1:50.43	
18	4	1	Rodrigo Castro	Brazil	1:50.65	
19	4	2	Daisuke Hosokawa	Japan	1:50.91	
20	6	7	Hisato Matsumoto	Japan	1:50.94	
21	3	5	Thiago Pereira	Brazil	1:50.95	
22	6	1	Adam Lucas	Australia	1:51.04	
23	2	4	Hiroaki Yamamoto	Japan	1:51.22	
24	4	8	Joel Greenshields	Canada	1:51.34	
25	3	8	Nicolas Oliveira	Brazil	1:51.35	
26	3	4	Robert Voss	New Zealand	1:51.42	
27	2	3	Lim Nam-Gyun	South Korea	1:51.71	
28	3	2	Michael Jack	New Zealand	1:52.34	
29	4	7	Tobias Oriwol	Canada	1:52.96	
30	3	7	Raymond Betuzzi	Canada	1:53.05	
31	3	6	André Schultz	Brazil	1:53.21	
31	5	1	Xin Tong	China	1:53.21	
33	6	8	Ephraim Hannant	Australia	1:53.24	
34	2	6	Ben Pickersgill-Brown	New Zealand	1:53.44	
35	5	8	Andrew McMillan	New Zealand	1:54.68	
36	3	2	Cameron Gibson	New Zealand	1:55.29	
37	3	5	Dean Kent	New Zealand	1:56.39	
38	2	2	Chen Te-Tung	Chinese Taipei	1:57.33	
39	2	8	Bryn Murphy	New Zealand	1:57.40	
40	3	1	He Xiaofeng	China	1:57.44	
41	1	6	Trent Grimsey	Australia	1:57.82	
42	1	5	Benjamin Guzman	Chile	1:58.92	
43	1	3	Kendrick Uy	Philippines	2:03.73	

=== B Final ===
The B final was held on August 17, at 18:43.

Rank	Lane	Name	Nationality	Time	Notes
9	3	Nicholas Ffrost	Australia	1:49.79	
10	4	Michael Klueh	United States	1:49.83	
11	5	Colin Russell	Canada	1:50.14	
12	6	Takamitsu Kojima	Japan	1:50.16	
13	8	Daisuke Hosokawa	Japan	1:51.15	
14	1	Rodrigo Castro	Brazil	1:51.27	
15	2	Yuji Sakurai	Japan	1:51.55	
16	7	Lucas Salatta	Brazil	1:52.06	

=== A Final ===
The A final was held on August 17, at 18:43.

Rank	Lane	Name	Nationality	Time	Notes
1st place, gold medalist(s)	6	Klete Keller	United States	1:46.20	
2nd place, silver medalist(s)	2	Park Tae-Hwan	South Korea	1:47.51	
3rd place, bronze medalist(s)	3	Zhang Lin	China	1:47.59	
4	5	Brent Hayden	Canada	1:47.78	
5	4	Peter Vanderkaay	United States	1:48.05	
6	1	Kenrick Monk	Australia	1:49.12	
7	7	Brian Johns	Canada	1:49.54	
8	8	Leith Brodie	Australia	1:50.12	
