= 2010 Pan Pacific Swimming Championships – Men's 200 metre freestyle =

Men's 200 metre freestyle at the 2010 Pan Pacific Swimming Championships
- Venue: William Woollett Jr. Aquatics Center
- Dates: August 18, 2010 (heats & finals)
- Competitors: 31 from 11 nations
- Winning time: 1:45.30

Medalists
| gold medal | Ryan Lochte | United States |
| silver medal | Park Tae-Hwan | South Korea |
| bronze medal | Peter Vanderkaay | United States |

The men's 200 metre freestyle competition at the 2010 Pan Pacific Swimming Championships took place on August 18 at the William Woollett Jr. Aquatics Center. The last champion was Klete Keller of US.

This race consisted of four lengths of the pool, all in freestyle.

== Records ==
Prior to this competition, the existing world and Pan Pacific records were as follows:

| World record | Paul Biedermann (GER) | 1:42.00 | Rome, Italy | July 28, 2009 |
| Pan Pacific Championships record | Ian Thorpe (AUS) | 1:44.75 | Yokohama, Japan | August 24, 2002 |

== Results ==
All times are in minutes and seconds.

| KEY: | q | Fastest non-qualifiers | Q | Qualified | CR | Championships record | NR | National record | PB | Personal best | SB | Seasonal best |

=== Heats ===
The first round was held on August 18, at 10:34.

| Rank | Heat | Lane | Name | Nationality | Time | Notes |
|---|---|---|---|---|---|---|
| 1 | 3 | 5 | Ryan Lochte | United States | 1:46.10 | QA |
| 2 | 4 | 3 | Peter Vanderkaay | United States | 1:46.66 | QA |
| 3 | 2 | 4 | Kenrick Monk | Australia | 1:47.38 | QA |
| 4 | 4 | 2 | Thomas Fraser-Holmes | Australia | 1:47.39 | QA |
| 5 | 3 | 3 | Nicholas Ffrost | Australia | 1:47.48 | QA |
| 6 | 4 | 6 | Ricky Berens | United States | 1:47.55 | QA |
| 7 | 4 | 5 | Jean Basson | South Africa | 1:47.80 | QA |
| 8 | 4 | 4 | Park Tae-Hwan | South Korea | 1:47.85 | QA |
| 9 | 2 | 6 | Yoshihiro Okumura | Japan | 1:48.07 | QB |
| 10 | 4 | 1 | Yuki Kobori | Japan | 1:48.09 | QB |
| 11 | 3 | 4 | Sho Uchida | Japan | 1:48.40 | QB |
| 12 | 2 | 1 | Charlie Houchin | United States | 1:48.44 | QB |
| 13 | 2 | 5 | Shaune Fraser | Cayman Islands | 1:48.53 | QB |
| 14 | 2 | 3 | Ahmed Mathlouthi | Tunisia | 1:49.21 | QB |
| 14 | 3 | 7 | Colin Russell | Canada | 1:49.21 | QB |
| 16 | 4 | 8 | Blake Worsley | Canada | 1:49.30 | QB |
| 17 | 1 | 6 | Leith Brodie | Australia | 1:49.39 | |
| 18 | 3 | 8 | Hassaan Khalik | Canada | 1:49.40 | |
| 19 | 3 | 2 | Tommaso D'Orsogna | Australia | 1:49.73 | |
| 20 | 2 | 8 | Kyle Richardson | Australia | 1:50.21 | |
| 21 | 3 | 1 | André Schultz | Brazil | 1:50.22 | |
| 22 | 3 | 6 | Nicolas Oliveira | Brazil | 1:50.36 | |
| 23 | 4 | 7 | Shunsuke Kuzuhara | Japan | 1:50.73 | |
| 24 | 2 | 7 | Rodrigo Castro | Brazil | 1:50.79 | |
| 25 | 1 | 1 | Nicholas Sinclair | Canada | 1:50.94 | |
| 26 | 2 | 2 | Brett Fraser | Cayman Islands | 1:50.98 | |
| 27 | 1 | 4 | Joonmo Bae | South Korea | 1:51.29 | |
| 28 | 1 | 3 | Leonardo Fim | Brazil | 1:51.60 | |
| 29 | 1 | 7 | Sangjin Jang | South Korea | 1:52.52 | |
| 30 | 1 | 5 | Sebastian Jahnsen | Peru | 1:53.20 | |
| 31 | 1 | 2 | Miguel Molina | Philippines | 1:55.36 | |

=== B Final ===
The B final was held on August 18, at 18:53.

| Rank | Lane | Name | Nationality | Time | Notes |
|---|---|---|---|---|---|
| 9 | 5 | Ricky Berens | United States | 1:47.45 | |
| 10 | 4 | Nicholas Ffrost | Australia | 1:48.13 | |
| 11 | 2 | Colin Russell | Canada | 1:48.49 | |
| 12 | 3 | Sho Uchida | Japan | 1:48.67 | |
| 13 | 6 | Shaune Fraser | Cayman Islands | 1:48.96 | |
| 14 | 1 | Blake Worsley | Canada | 1:49.67 | |
| 15 | 8 | André Schultz | Brazil | 1:49.85 | |
| 16 | 7 | Ahmed Mathlouthi | Tunisia | 1:50.17 | |

=== A Final ===
The A final was held on August 18, at 18:53.

| Rank | Lane | Name | Nationality | Time | Notes |
|---|---|---|---|---|---|
| 1st place, gold medalist(s) | 4 | Ryan Lochte | United States | 1:45.30 | |
| 2nd place, silver medalist(s) | 7 | Park Tae-Hwan | South Korea | 1:46.27 | |
| 3rd place, bronze medalist(s) | 5 | Peter Vanderkaay | United States | 1:46.65 | |
| 4 | 6 | Thomas Fraser-Holmes | Australia | 1:47.23 | |
| 5 | 3 | Kenrick Monk | Australia | 1:47.37 | |
| 6 | 2 | Jean Basson | South Africa | 1:47.43 | |
| 7 | 8 | Yuki Kobori | Japan | 1:48.42 | |
| 8 | 1 | Yoshihiro Okumura | Japan | 1:49.28 | |
