= 2008 Australian Swimming Championships =

The 2008 Telstra Australian Swimming Championships were held at the Sydney Olympic Park Aquatic Centre in Sydney, New South Wales, Australia from 22–29 March 2008. The championships were used as the Australian trials for the 2008 Olympic Games squad.

Like all previous Australian swimming trials, the championships program mirrored the 2008 Olympic swimming program with the addition of the non-Olympic events – 50 m backstroke, breaststroke and butterfly; 800 m freestyle (men) and 1500 m freestyle (women).

== Results ==
Highlighted swimmers achieved the qualification conditions to be included in the Olympic team in that respective event.

=== Men's events ===
Event	Gold		Silver		Bronze	
50 m freestyle	Eamon Sullivan	21.28 WR	Ashley Callus	22.02	Jonathon Newton	22.15
100 m freestyle	Eamon Sullivan	47.52 OC	Matt Targett	48.36	Andrew Lauterstein	48.57
200 m freestyle	Grant Hackett	1:47.03	Kenrick Monk	1:47.10	Nicholas Sprenger	1:47.17
400 m freestyle	Grant Hackett	3:43.15	Craig Stevens	3:46.64	Robert Hurley	3:49.48
800 m freestyle	Cameron Smith	8:04.95	Michael Hardy	8:11.67	Alexander McNeill	8:18.05
1500 m freestyle	Grant Hackett	14:48.65	Craig Stevens	14:53.18	Trent Grimsey	15:12.36
50 m backstroke	Ashley Delaney	25.18	Hayden Stoeckel	25.47	Matt Welsh	25.52
100 m backstroke	Ashley Delaney	53.68 OC	Hayden Stoeckel	53.86	Matt Welsh	54.21
200 m backstroke	Hayden Stoeckel	1:56.75 OC	Ashley Delaney	1:57.53	Ephriam Hannant	1:59.50
50 m breaststroke	Brenton Rickard	27.30 OC	Christian Sprenger	28.36	Karl Wurzer	28.84
100 m breaststroke	Brenton Rickard	1:00.04 OC	Christian Sprenger	1:00.22	Jim Piper	1:00.92
200 m breaststroke	Brenton Rickard	2:09.51 OC	Christian Sprenger	2:11.02	Craig Tucker	2:12.86
50 m butterfly	Matt Targett	23.51	Andrew Lauterstein	23.61	Chris Wright	24.12
100 m butterfly	Andrew Lauterstein	51.91	Adam Pine	52.13	Garth Kates	52.47
200 m butterfly	Nick D'Arcy	1:55.10 OC	Travis Nederpelt	1:56.06	Chris Wright	1:58.75
200 m individual medley	Leith Brodie	1:59.90	Adam Lucas	2:01.84	Travis Nederpelt	2:02.79
400 m individual medley	Travis Nederpelt	4:16.31	Adam Lucas	4:19.07	Nick Cordner	4:21.56
4×100 m freestyle relay	Andrew Lauterstein (48.57); Ashley Callus (48.68); Patrick Murphy (49.27); Kirk Palmer (49.44)	?	?	?	?	?
4×200 m freestyle relay	Nicholas Sprenger (01:47.17); Leith Brodie (1:47.47); Patrick Murphy (1:47.50); Grant Brits (1:47.56)	?	?	?	?	?
4×100 m medley relay	?	?	?	?	?	?

=== Women's events ===
Event	Gold		Silver		Bronze	
50 m freestyle	Libby Trickett	23.97 WR	Cate Campbell	24.38	Sophie Edington	24.98
100 m freestyle	Libby Trickett	52.88 WR	Cate Campbell	53.81	Melanie Schlanger	54.20
200 m freestyle	Bronte Barratt	1:56.60 OC	Linda Mackenzie	1:56.99	Angie Bainbridge	1:58.11
400 m freestyle	Linda Mackenzie	4:04.73 OC	Bronte Barratt	4:05.19	Kylie Palmer	4:06.21
800 m freestyle	Kylie Palmer	8:24.30	Melissa Gorman	8:36.23	Lorren Sellwood	8:39.89
1500 m freestyle	Erin McCleave	16:50.41	Luane Rowe	16:54.95	Alexandra Bagley	16:58.00
50 m backstroke	Sophie Edington	27.67 WR	Tayliah Zimmer	28.24	Rachel Goh	29.42
100 m backstroke	Emily Seebohm	59.59 OC	Sophie Edington	59.84	Belinda Hocking	59.97
200 m backstroke	Meagen Nay	2:08.55 OC	Belinda Hocking	2:08.93	Emily Seebohm	2:10.10
50 m breaststroke	Tarnee White	30.66	Jade Edmistone	31.13	Kristy Morrison	31.69
100 m breaststroke	Leisel Jones	1:05.75	Tarnee White	1:06.46	Sarah Katsoulis	1:07.58
200 m breaststroke	Leisel Jones	2:21.34	Sally Foster	2:25.70	Sarah Katsoulis	2:26.72
50 m butterfly	Marieke Guehrer	26.48	Danni Miatke	26.61	Jessicah Schipper	26.72
100 m butterfly	Libby Trickett	56.81 OC	Jessicah Schipper	57.31	Felicity Galvez	58.39
200 m butterfly	Jessicah Schipper	2:06.82	Samantha Hamill	2:07.61	Felicity Galvez	2:07.67
200 m individual medley	Stephanie Rice	2:08.92 WR	Alicia Coutts	2:11.87	Shayne Reese	2:12.97
400 m individual medley	Stephanie Rice	4:31.46 WR	Samantha Hamill	4:41.61	Ellen Fullerton	4:46.79
4×100 m freestyle relay	Melanie Schlanger (54.20); Alice Mills (00:54.27); Shayne Reese (54.80); Angie Bainbridge (55.01)	?	?	?	?	?
4×200 m freestyle relay	Angie Bainbridge (1:58.11); Lara Davenport (1:58.55); Melanie Schlanger (1:58.71); Kylie Palmer (1:58.79)	?	?	?	?	?
4×100 m medley relay	?	?	?	?	?	?

== Olympic team news ==
Due to strong performances, two additional members were added to the Australian Olympic swim team: Nick Ffrost and Felicity Galvez both finished seventh in their 200 m freestyle events. Additionally, Galvez finished third in the women's 100 m butterfly. This created controversy with freestyler Andrew Mewing, who finished 8th in the 200 m freestyle under the A qualifying time. However, Galvez was selected via a B qualifying time that ranked her 9th in the 200 m freestyle. Mewing appealed his omission to the Court of Arbitration for Sport (CAS), which he lost. Adam Lucas finished second in both the 200 m and 400 m individual medley events, but was not selected because he swam a B qualifying time, rather than an A qualifying time. These were the only events on the Australian roster that remained without a second qualifier.

Melissa Gorman failed to meet the qualification time for the 800 m freestyle at the championships themselves, however was included in the team to swim this event after qualifying for the 10 km marathon swimming event.

During the early hours of 30 March 2008, Nick D'Arcy was involved in a physical altercation with a fellow Australia swimmer, Simon Cowley. D'Arcy was subsequently charged with assault occasioning grievous bodily harm. On 18 April, Australian Olympic Committee (AOC) president John Coates removed D'Arcy from the 2008 Australian Olympic team, claiming that the swimmer had brought the team into disrepute. D'Arcy subsequently appealed to CAS. CAS supported the Coates' decision, but also found that it should have been voted on by the entire AOC Board. Subsequently, on 11 June 2008, the AOC Board unanimously decided to withdraw D'Arcy's membership from the team. D'Arcy appealed again, but was rejected on 16 June 2008. In March 2009, D'Arcy received a jail sentence of 14 months and 12 days, suspended on condition of good behavior.

== See also ==
- 2008 in swimming
