= 2006 Pan Pacific Swimming Championships – Men's 100 metre freestyle =

Men's 100 metre freestyle at the 2006 Pan Pacific Swimming Championships
- Venue: Saanich Commonwealth Place
- Dates: August 18, 2006 (heats & finals)
- Competitors: 59 from 12 nations
- Winning time: 48.59

Medalists
gold medal	Brent Hayden	Canada
silver medal	Jason Lezak	United States
bronze medal	Eamon Sullivan	Australia
bronze medal	Roland Schoeman	South Africa

The men's 100 metre freestyle competition at the 2006 Pan Pacific Swimming Championships took place on August 18 at the Saanich Commonwealth Place. The last champion was Ian Thorpe of Australia.

This race consisted of two lengths of the pool, both lengths being in freestyle.

== Records ==
Prior to this competition, the existing world and Pan Pacific records were as follows:

World record	Pieter van den Hoogenband (NED)	47.84	Sydney, Australia	September 19, 2000
Pan Pacific Championships record	Michael Klim (AUS)	48.81	Sydney, Australia	August 25, 1999

== Results ==
All times are in minutes and seconds.

KEY:	q	Fastest non-qualifiers	Q	Qualified	CR	Championships record	NR	National record	PB	Personal best	SB	Seasonal best

=== Heats ===
The first round was held on August 18, at 10:12.

Rank	Heat	Lane	Name	Nationality	Time	Notes
1	8	4	Jason Lezak	United States	49.05	QA
2	6	5	Eamon Sullivan	Australia	49.17	QA
3	7	5	Brent Hayden	Canada	49.23	QA
4	6	4	Neil Walker	United States	49.24	QA
5	5	4	César Cielo	Brazil	49.32	QA
6	7	4	Cullen Jones	United States	49.50	QA
7	8	1	Lyndon Ferns	South Africa	49.57	QA
8	8	3	Ben Wildman-Tobriner	United States	49.70	QA
9	7	3	Rick Say	Canada	49.72	QB
10	8	5	Roland Schoeman	South Africa	49.78	QB
11	7	6	Klete Keller	United States	49.86	QB
12	3	3	Gary Hall, Jr.	United States	50.02	QB
12	6	6	Andrew Mewing	Australia	50.02	QB
14	7	7	Ian Crocker	United States	50.15	QB
15	4	4	Gerhard Zandberg	South Africa	50.17	QB
16	6	7	Colin Russell	Canada	50.20	QB
17	8	6	Matt Rose	Canada	50.24	
18	4	2	Ryan Lochte	United States	50.26	
18	5	8	Nicolas Oliveira	Brazil	50.26	
20	6	8	Daisuke Hosokawa	Japan	50.36	
21	6	2	Takamitsu Kojima	Japan	50.39	
22	7	1	Joel Greenshields	Canada	50.40	
23	4	3	Rodrigo Castro	Brazil	50.41	
23	6	1	George Bovell	Trinidad and Tobago	50.41	
25	8	7	Yannick Lupien	Canada	50.54	
26	5	6	Edvaldo Valério	Brazil	50.62	
26	7	2	Kenrick Monk	Australia	50.62	
28	5	7	Marco Sapucaia	Brazil	50.76	
29	5	2	Eduardo Deboni	Brazil	50.85	
30	6	3	Nicholas Santos	Brazil	50.86	
31	7	8	Hiroaki Yamamoto	Japan	50.87	
32	4	8	Michael Klueh	United States	50.93	
33	8	8	Casey Flouch	Australia	51.01	
34	5	1	Nicholas Ffrost	Australia	51.07	
35	8	2	Guilherme Santos	Brazil	51.13	
36	5	5	Makoto Ito	Japan	51.17	
37	4	1	Ken Takakuwa	Japan	51.36	
38	2	8	Gabriel Mangabeira	Brazil	51.45	
39	3	4	Yuji Sakurai	Japan	51.50	
39	3	4	Lim Nam-Gyun	South Korea	51.50	
41	3	2	Corney Swanepoel	New Zealand	51.63	
42	4	6	Andrew Lauterstein	Australia	51.64	
43	3	1	Michael Jack	New Zealand	51.65	
44	2	2	Joshua Krogh	Australia	51.75	
45	3	8	Pascal Wollach	Canada	51.77	
46	5	3	Cameron Gibson	New Zealand	51.79	
47	2	7	Daniel Madwed	United States	51.87	
48	1	2	Hayden Stoeckel	Australia	51.92	
49	3	5	Robert Voss	New Zealand	51.94	
50	4	7	Peter Marshall	United States	51.97	
51	1	3	Moss Burmester	New Zealand	52.35	
52	1	5	Ephraim Hannant	Australia	52.46	
53	2	5	Ethan Rolff	Australia	52.72	
53	2	6	Ben Pickersgill-Brown	New Zealand	52.72	
55	2	3	Kendrick Uy	Philippines	52.77	
56	2	1	Jake Tapp	Canada	52.79	
57	1	4	Oliver Elliot	Chile	53.58	
58	2	4	Yuan Ping	Chinese Taipei	53.72	
59	1	6	John Zulch	New Zealand	54.37	
-	4	5	Aaron Peirsol	United States	DSQ	

=== B Final ===
The B final was held on August 18, at 18:12.

Rank	Lane	Name	Nationality	Time	Notes
9	4	Cullen Jones	United States	49.68	
10	5	Andrew Mewing	Australia	50.07	
11	1	Takamitsu Kojima	Japan	50.18	
12	6	Rodrigo Castro	Brazil	50.29	
13	7	Daisuke Hosokawa	Japan	50.38	
14	2	Nicolas Oliveira	Brazil	50.58	
15	8	George Bovell	Trinidad and Tobago	50.89	
16	3	Gerhard Zandberg	South Africa	51.12	

=== A Final ===
The A final was held on August 18, at 18:12.

Rank	Lane	Name	Nationality	Time	Notes
1st place, gold medalist(s)	3	Brent Hayden	Canada	48.59	CR
2nd place, silver medalist(s)	4	Jason Lezak	United States	48.76	
3rd place, bronze medalist(s)	5	Eamon Sullivan	Australia	49.09	
3rd place, bronze medalist(s)	8	Roland Schoeman	South Africa	49.09	
5	7	Lyndon Ferns	South Africa	49.11	
6	6	Neil Walker	United States	49.19	
7	2	César Cielo	Brazil	49.66	
8	1	Rick Say	Canada	49.79	
