= 2006 Pan Pacific Swimming Championships – Men's 4 × 200 metre freestyle relay =

Men's 4 × 200 metre freestyle relay at the 2006 Pan Pacific Swimming Championships
- Venue: Saanich Commonwealth Place
- Dates: August 18, 2006 (heats & finals)
- Winning time: 7:05.28

Medalists
gold medal	Michael Phelps, Ryan Lochte, Peter Vanderkaay and Klete Keller	United States
silver medal	Brian Johns, Andrew Hurd, Brent Hayden and Colin Russell	Canada
bronze medal	Leith Brodie, Andrew Mewing, Nicholas Ffrost and Kenrick Monk	Australia

The men's 4 × 200 metre freestyle relay competition at the 2006 Pan Pacific Swimming Championships took place on August 18 at the Saanich Commonwealth Place. The last champion was Australia.

This race consisted of sixteen lengths of the pool. Each of the four swimmers completed four lengths of the pool. The first swimmer had to touch the wall before the second could leave the starting block.

== Records ==
Prior to this competition, the existing world and Pan Pacific records were as follows:

World record	Australia (AUS); Grant Hackett (1:46.11); Michael Klim (1:46.49); Bill Kirby (1:47.92); Ian Thorpe (1:44.14)	7:04.66	Fukuoka, Japan	July 27, 2001
Pan Pacific Championships record	Australia (AUS); Ian Thorpe (1:46.28); Bill Kirby (1:48.96); Grant Hackett (1:46.30); Michael Klim (1:47.25)	7:08.79	Sydney, Australia	August 25, 1999

== Results ==
All times are in minutes and seconds.

KEY:	q	Fastest non-qualifiers	Q	Qualified	CR	Championships record	NR	National record	PB	Personal best	SB	Seasonal best

=== Heats ===
Heats weren't performed, as only seven teams had entered.

=== Final ===
The final was held on August 18, at 20:10.

Rank	Lane	Name	Nationality	Time	Notes
1st place, gold medalist(s)	4	Michael Phelps (1:45.91); Ryan Lochte (1:47.34); Peter Vanderkaay (1:46.49); Klete Keller (1:45.54)	United States	7:05.28	CR
2nd place, silver medalist(s)	5	Brian Johns (1:48.91); Andrew Hurd (1:47.61); Brent Hayden (1:47.36); Colin Russell (1:48.51)	Canada	7:12.39	
3rd place, bronze medalist(s)	6	Leith Brodie (1:50.82); Andrew Mewing (1:48.66); Nicholas Ffrost (1:48.93); Kenrick Monk (1:48.80)	Australia	7:17.21	
4	3	Takeshi Matsuda (1:48.62); Takamitsu Kojima(1:49.96); Yuji Sakurai (1:49.89); Daisuke Hosokawa (1:49.16)	Japan	7:17.63	
5	7	Robert Voss (1:51.24); Andrew McMillan (1:53.15); Ben Pickersgill-Brown (1:52.98); Michael Jack (1:52.37)	New Zealand	7:29.74	
6	2	Rodrigo Castro (1:50.92); Nicolas Oliveira (1:52.81); André Schultz (1:52.07); Lucas Salatta (1:54.09)	Brazil	7:29.89	
7	1	Tsai Kuo-Chuan (1:55.04); Chen Te-Tung (1:56.29); Yuan Ping (1:54.60); Tang Sheng-Chieh (1:56.27)	Chinese Taipei	7:42.20	
