= Swimming at the 2006 Commonwealth Games – Men's 4 × 200 metre freestyle relay =

Men's Commonwealth Games event

Men's 4 × 200 metre freestyle relay at the 2006 Commonwealth Games
- Venue: Melbourne Sports and Aquatic Centre
- Dates: 18 March 2006
- Competitors: 32 from 8 nations
- Winning time: 7:14.14

Medalists
gold medal	Simon Burnett; Alex Scotcher; Dean Milwain; Ross Davenport	England
silver medal	David Carry; Euan Dale; Andrew Hunter; Robert Renwick	Scotland
bronze medal	Nick Ffrost; Kenrick Monk; Andrew Mewing; Josh Krogh	Australia

The 4 × 200 metres freestyle relay was at Melbourne Sports and Aquatic Centre on 18 March. There was only one heat.

== Records ==
Prior to this competition, the existing world, Commonwealth and Games records were as follows:

World record	Australia (AUS); Grant Hackett (1:46.11); Michael Klim (1:46.49); Bill Kirby (1:47.92); Ian Thorpe (1:44.14)	7:04.66	Fukuoka, Japan	27 July 2001
Commonwealth record	Australia (AUS); Grant Hackett (1:46.11); Michael Klim (1:46.49); Bill Kirby (1:47.92); Ian Thorpe (1:44.14)	7:04.66	Fukuoka, Japan	27 July 2001
Games record	Australia; Grant Hackett (1:46.61); Leon Dunne (1:50.45); Jason Cram (1:49.81); Ian Thorpe (1:44.82)	7:11.69	Manchester, England	1 August 2002

== Final ==
The final was held at 9:11 pm.

Rank	Lane		Names	Time	Notes
1st place, gold medalist(s)	3	England	Simon Burnett (1:47.57); Alex Scotcher (1:50.01); Dean Milwain (1:49.85); Ross Davenport (1:46.71)	7:14.14	
2nd place, silver medalist(s)	6	Scotland	David Carry (1:48.25); Euan Dale (1:48.99); Andrew Hunter (1:48.54); Robert Renwick (1:48.62)	7:14.40	
3rd place, bronze medalist(s)	4	Australia	Nick Ffrost (1:48.91); Kenrick Monk (1:47.87); Andrew Mewing (1:48.65); Josh Krogh (1:49.56)	7:14.99	
4	5	Canada	Brent Hayden (1:48.47); Colin Russell (1:49.52); Brian Johns (1:50.20); Rick Say (1:47.63)	7:15.82	
5	2	South Africa	Jean Basson (1:49.70); Darian Townsend (1:52.42); George Du Rand (1:52.94); Mark Randall (1:52.95)	7:28.01	
6	1	Jersey	Simon le Couilliard (1:58.45); Daniel Halksworth (1:58.78); Liam du Feu (1:57.70); Alexis Militis (1:56.81)	7:51.74	
7	8	Guernsey	Ben Lowndes (2:00.00); Jeremy Osborne (2:00.02); Ian Powell (1:59.34); Jonathon Le Noury (1:58.20)	7:57.56	
	7	Singapore	Zhirong Tay (1:54.88); Lee Yu Tan; Shirong Su; Mingzhe Cheah	DSQ	
