= Swimming at the 2007 World Aquatics Championships – Men's 4 × 200 metre freestyle relay =

Men's 4×200 metre freestyle relay at the 2007 FINA World Championships
- Venue: Rod Laver Arena
- Date: 30 March 2007
- Teams: 27
- Winning time: 7:03.24 WR

Medalists
gold medal	Michael Phelps; Ryan Lochte; Klete Keller; Peter Vanderkaay	United States
silver medal	Patrick Murphy; Andrew Mewing; Grant Brits; Kenrick Monk	Australia
bronze medal	Brian Johns; Brent Hayden; Rick Say; Andrew Hurd	Canada

The men's 4×200 metre freestyle relay at the 2007 World Aquatics Championships took place on 30 March 2007 at the Rod Laver Arena in Melbourne, Australia. The top-12 finishers from this race qualified for the event at the 2008 Olympics. 27 teams entered and swam the event.

The existing records when the event started were:

- World record (WR): 7:04.66, Australia (Hackett, Klim, Kirby, Thorpe), 27 July 2001 in Fukuoka, Japan.
- Championship record (CR): 7:04.66, Australia (Hackett, Klim, Kirby, Thorpe), Fukuoka 2001 (27 July 2001)

== Results ==
=== Finals ===
Place	Nation	Swimmers	Time	Note
1	(United States) USA	Michael Phelps (1:45.36), Ryan Lochte (1:45.86), Klete Keller (1:46.31), Peter Vanderkaay (1:45.71)	7:03.24	WR
2	Australia	Patrick Murphy (1:48.55), Andrew Mewing (1:47.52), Grant Brits (1:48.21), Kenrick Monk (1:45.77)	7:10.05	
3	Canada	Brian Johns (1:48.46), Brent Hayden (1:46.59), Rick Say (1:47.59), Andrew Hurd (1:48.06)	7:10.70	
4	(United Kingdom) Great Britain	David Carry (1:48.16), Robert Renwick (1:48.94), Simon Burnett (1:47.20), Ross Davenport (1:46.98)	7:11.28	
5	Italy	Filippo Magnini (1:47.66), Andrea Busato (1:50.21), Nicola Cassio (1:47.87), Massimiliano Rosolino (1:46.57)	7:12.31	
6	Russia	Evgeny Lagunov (1:48.82), Andrey Kapralov (1:48.86), Nikita Lobintsev (1:49.26), Sergey Perunin (1:47.92)	7:14.86	
7	Japan	Takeshi Matsuda (1:49.40), Yuji Sakurai (1:49.21), Takamitsu Kojima (1:50.10), Daisuke Hosokawa (1:48.75)	7:17.46	
7	Poland	Paweł Korzeniowski (1:48.43), Michal Rokicki (1:49.57), Lukasz Giminski (1:50.18), Przemysław Stańczyk (1:49.28)	7:17.46	

=== Heats ===
Rank	Nation	Swimmers	Time	Note
1	(United States) USA	Peter Vanderkaay (1:46.67), Jayme Cramer (1:47.97), Dave Walters (1:47.75), Klete Keller (1:48.60)	7:10.99	Q Olympic
2	Australia	Kenrick Monk (1:49.13), Andrew Mewing (1:47.95), Grant Brits (1:48.73), Nick Ffrost (1:49.03)	7:14.84	Q Olympic
3	Canada	Rick Say (1:50.13), Brian Johns (1:48.06), Andrew Hurd (1:47.63), Brent Hayden (1:50.18)	7:16.00	Q Olympic
4	Italy	Massimiliano Rosolino (1:48.85), Andrea Busato (1:49.44), Christian Galenda (1:50.03), Nicola Cassio (1:48.93)	7:17.42	Q Olympic
5	Japan	Takeshi Matsuda (1:49.05), Yuji Sakurai (1:49.44), Takamitsu Kojima (1:50.03), Daisuke Hosokawa (1:48.93)	7:17.45	Q Olympic
6	Russia	Evgeny Lagunov (1:48.96), Vitaly Romanovich (1:50.63), Sergey Perunin (1:48.92), Nikita Lobintsev (1:49.63)	7:18.14	Q Olympic
7	(United Kingdom) Great Britain	Ross Davenport (1:50.34), Andrew Hunter (1:49.47), Robert Lang (1:50.07), Robert Renwick (1:48.94)	7:18.82	Q Olympic
8	Poland	Paweł Korzeniowski (1:49.01), Michal Rokicki (1:49.98), Lukasz Giminski (1:50.64), Przemysław Stańczyk (1:49.30)	7:18.93	Q Olympic
9	Germany	Paul Biedermann (1:49.59), Stefan Herbst (1:49.42), Benjamin Starke (1:49.64), Lars Conrad (1:50.57)	7:19.22	Olympic
10	France	Fabien Gilot (1:49.02), Sébastien Rouault (1:49.77), Nicolas Rostoucher (1:50.30), Grégory Mallet (1:50.63)	7:19.72	Olympic
11	Brazil	Thiago Pereira, Rodrigo Castro, Nicolas Oliveira, Armando Negreiros	7:20.00	Olympic
12	Greece	Andreas Zisimos, Georgios Demetis, Ioannis Giannoulis, Nikolaos Zylouris	7:20.07	Olympic
13	China	ZHANG Lin, ZHANG Enjian, YU Chenglong, CHEN Zuo	7:20.36	
14	Portugal	Tiago Venâncio, Fabio Pereira, Diogo Carvalho, Adriano Niz	7:20.46	
15	Netherlands	Olaf Wildeboer, Bas van Velthoven, Joost Reijns, Mitja Zastrow	7:21.51	
16	New Zealand	Moss Burmester, Andrew McMillan, Robert Voss, Michael Jack	7:22.18	
17	Austria	Dominik Koll, Dinko Jukić, David Brandl, Florian Janistyn	7:22.58	
18	Lithuania	Vytautas Janušaitis (NR), Saulius Binevičius, Paulius Andrijauskas, Paulius Viktoravicius	7:25.37	NR
19	Croatia	Dominik Straga, Saša Imprić, Mario Todorović, Mario Delač	7:35.43	
20	Chile	Giancarlo Zolezzi Seoane, Maximiliano Schnettler, Benjamin Guzman Blanco, Salvador Mallat Arcaya	7:41.80	
21	Uzbekistan	Timur Irgashev, Ibrahim Nazarov, Petr Romashkin, Danil Bugakov	7:47.20	
22	Singapore	Zhirong Bryan Tay, Ju Wei Sng, Wen Hao Joshua Lim, Bing Ming Thum	7:52.17	
23	Indonesia	Albert Cristiadi Sutanto, Felix Cristiadi Sutanto, Brian Howard Ho, Andy Wibowo	7:52.81	
24	Peru	Sebastian Jahnsen, Gianmarco Mosto, Oscar Jahnsen, Jose Emmanuel Crescimbeni	7:55.97	
25	(United States Virgin Islands) Virgin Islands	Kieran Locke, Josh Laban, Kevin Hensley, Morgan Locke	7:56.67	
26	India	Rehan Poncha, Ankur Poseria, Amar Muralidharan, Virdhawal Khade	8:01.49	
27	Guam	Carlos Shimizu, Celestino Aguon, Hernan Bonsembiante, Christopher Duenas	8:44.25	

== See also ==
- Swimming at the 2005 World Aquatics Championships – Men's 4 × 200 metre freestyle relay
- Swimming at the 2008 Summer Olympics – Men's 4 × 200 metre freestyle relay
- Swimming at the 2009 World Aquatics Championships – Men's 4 × 200 metre freestyle relay
