= 2010 Pan Pacific Swimming Championships – Men's 4 × 200 metre freestyle relay =

Men's 4 × 200 metre freestyle relay at the 2010 Pan Pacific Swimming Championships
- Venue: William Woollett Jr. Aquatics Center
- Dates: August 19, 2010 (heats & finals)
- Winning time: 7:03.84

Medalists
gold medal	Michael Phelps, Peter Vanderkaay, Ricky Berens and Ryan Lochte	United States
silver medal	Takeshi Matsuda, Yuki Kobori, Yoshihiro Okumura and Sho Uchida	Japan
bronze medal	Thomas Fraser-Holmes, Nicholas Ffrost, Kenrick Monk and Leith Brodie	Australia

The men's 4 × 200 metre freestyle relay competition at the 2010 Pan Pacific Swimming Championships took place on August 19 at the William Woollett Jr. Aquatics Center. The last champion was the United States.

This race consisted of sixteen lengths of the pool. Each of the four swimmers completed four lengths of the pool. The first swimmer had to touch the wall before the second could leave the starting block.

== Records ==
Prior to this competition, the existing world and Pan Pacific records were as follows:

World record	United States (USA); Michael Phelps (1:44.49); Ricky Berens (1:44.13); David Walters (1:45.47); Ryan Lochte (1:44.46)	6:58.55	Rome, Italy	July 31, 2009
Pan Pacific Championships record	United States (USA); Michael Phelps (1:45.91); Ryan Lochte (1:47.34); Peter Vanderkaay (1:46.49); Klete Keller (1:45.54)	7:05.28	Victoria, Canada	August 18, 2006

== Results ==
All times are in minutes and seconds.

KEY:	q	Fastest non-qualifiers	Q	Qualified	CR	Championships record	NR	National record	PB	Personal best	SB	Seasonal best

=== Heats ===
Heats weren't performed, as only six teams had entered.

=== Final ===
The final was held on August 19, at 20:21.

Rank	Lane	Name	Nationality	Time	Notes
1st place, gold medalist(s)	4	Michael Phelps (1:45.62); Peter Vanderkaay (1:46.46); Ricky Berens (1:46.49); Ryan Lochte (1:45.27)	United States	7:03.84	CR
2nd place, silver medalist(s)	3	Takeshi Matsuda (1:47.08); Yuki Kobori (1:47.90); Yoshihiro Okumura (1:48.17); Sho Uchida (1:47.86)	Japan	7:11.01	
3rd place, bronze medalist(s)	5	Thomas Fraser-Holmes (1:47.70); Nicholas Ffrost (1:47.71); Kenrick Monk (1:46.82); Leith Brodie (1:48.82)	Australia	7:11.05	
4	2	Brent Hayden (1:48.25); Colin Russell (1:47.16); Brian Johns (1:48.08); Stefan Hirniak (1:49.17)	Canada	7:12.66	
5	6	André Schultz (1:50.07); Rodrigo Castro (1:50.67); Leonardo Fim (1:52.91); Nicolas Oliveira (1:54.09)	Brazil	7:27.74	
6	7	Park Minkyu (1:54.36); Kang Yong-Hwan (1:53.44); Jang Sangjin (1:52.31); Bae Joonmo (1:52.88)	South Korea	7:32.99	
