= 2006 Pan Pacific Swimming Championships – Men's 4 × 100 metre freestyle relay =

Men's 4 × 100 metre freestyle relay at the 2006 Pan Pacific Swimming Championships
- Venue: Saanich Commonwealth Place
- Dates: August 19, 2006 (heats & finals)
- Winning time: 3:12.46

Medalists
gold medal	Michael Phelps, Neil Walker, Cullen Jones and Jason Lezak	United States
silver medal	Eamon Sullivan, Ian Thorpe, Leith Brodie and Kenrick Monk	Australia
bronze medal	Rick Say, Brent Hayden, Colin Russell and Matthew Rose	Canada

The men's 4 × 100 metre freestyle relay competition at the 2006 Pan Pacific Swimming Championships took place on August 19 at the Saanich Commonwealth Place. The last champion was Australia.

This race consisted of eight lengths of the pool. Each of the four swimmers completed two lengths of the pool. The first swimmer had to touch the wall before the second could leave the starting block.

== Records ==
Prior to this competition, the existing world and Pan Pacific records were as follows:

World record	South Africa (RSA); Roland Schoeman (48.17); Lyndon Ferns (48.13); Darian Townsend (48.96); Ryk Neethling (47.91)	3:13.17	Athens, Greece	August 15, 2004
Pan Pacific Championships record	United States (USA); David Fox (49.32); Joe Hudepohl (49.11); Jon Olsen (48.17); Gary Hall, Jr. (48.51)	3:15.11	Atlanta, United States	August 12, 1995

== Results ==
All times are in minutes and seconds.

KEY:	q	Fastest non-qualifiers	Q	Qualified	CR	Championships record	NR	National record	PB	Personal best	SB	Seasonal best

=== Heats ===
Heats weren't performed, as only seven teams had entered.

=== Final ===
The final was held on August 19, at 20:09.

Rank	Lane	Name	Nationality	Time	Notes
1st place, gold medalist(s)	3	Michael Phelps (48.83); Neil Walker (47.89); Cullen Jones (47.96); Jason Lezak (47.78)	United States	3:12.46	WR
2nd place, silver medalist(s)	4	Rick Say (49.79); Brent Hayden (48.07); Colin Russell (49.09); Matthew Rose (49.17)	Canada	3:16.12	
3rd place, bronze medalist(s)	5	Eamon Sullivan (49.30); Andrew Mewing (49.22); Leith Brodie (49.16); Kenrick Monk (48.74)	Australia	3:16.42	
4	6	Takamitsu Kojima (50.22); Daisuke Hosokawa (49.33); Makoto Ito (49.78); Hiroaki Yamamoto (49.87)	Japan	3:19.20	
5	7	Corney Swanepoel (51.17); Michael Jack (50.82); Robert Voss (50.26); Cameron Gibson (50.09)	New Zealand	3:22.34	
6	1	Yuan Ping (54.21); Chen Te-Tung (54.62); Tsai Kuo-Chuan (54.63); Tang Sheng-Chieh (54.49)	Chinese Taipei	3:37.95	
-	2	César Cielo (49.55); Rodrigo Castro (48.96); Nicolas Oliveira (-); Fernando Silva (-)	Brazil	DSQ	
