= Swimming at the 2006 Commonwealth Games – Men's 200 metre individual medley =

== Men's 200 m Individual Medley - Final ==
Pos.	Lane	Athlete	R.T.	50 m	100 m	150 m	200 m	Tbh.
	6	(Scotland) Gregor Tait (SCO)	0.85	26.92; 26.92	57.57; 30.65	1:31.73; 34.16	2:00.73; 29.00	
	4	(New Zealand) Dean Kent (NZL)	0.77	26.05; 26.05	56.77; 30.72	1:31.15; 34.38	2:01.08; 29.93	0.35
	7	(Canada) Brian Johns (CAN)	0.79	26.47; 26.47	57.70; 31.23	1:32.79; 35.09	2:01.56; 28.77	0.83
4	3	(Australia) Leith Brodie (AUS)	0.81	25.98; 25.98	57.04; 31.06	1:32.57; 35.53	2:01.84; 29.27	1.11
5	8	(Scotland) David Carry (SCO)	0.81	26.52; 26.52	57.67; 31.15	1:33.59; 35.92	2:02.06; 28.47	1.33
6	5	(Barbados) Bradley Ally (BAR)	0.67	26.08; 26.08	56.88; 30.80	1:32.36; 35.48	2:02.45; 30.09	1.72
7	1	(Scotland) Euan Dale (SCO)	0.74	26.43; 26.43	57.86; 31.43	1:33.48; 35.62	2:02.60; 29.12	1.87
8	2	(The Bahamas) Jeremy Knowles (BAH)	0.72	26.40; 26.40	58.57; 32.17	1:34.01; 35.44	2:02.85; 28.84	2.12

== Men's 200 m Individual Medley - Heats ==
=== Men's 200 m Individual Medley - Heat 01 ===
Pos.	Lane	Athlete	R.T.	50 m	100 m	150 m	200 m	Tbh.
1	4	(Canada) Brian Johns (CAN)	0.82	26.97; 26.97	58.40; 31.43	1:33.86; 35.46	2:03.38; 29.52	
2	5	(Scotland) David Carry (SCO)	0.87	27.20; 27.20	59.34; 32.14	1:35.67; 36.33	2:05.04; 29.37	1.66
3	3	(Cayman Islands) Shaune Fraser (CAY)	0.76	26.97; 26.97	59.14; 32.17	1:35.92; 36.78	2:05.19; 29.27	1.81
4	2	(Guernsey) Thomas Hollingsworth (GUE)	0.86	27.42; 27.42	1:00.27; 32.85	1:39.27; 39.00	2:10.88; 31.61	7.50
5	7	(India) Arjun Muralidharan (IND)	0.84	27.99; 27.99	1:02.13; 34.14	1:42.85; 40.72	2:13.21; 30.36	9.83
6	8	(Guernsey) Jeremy Osborne (GUE)	0.85	29.02; 29.02	1:05.25; 36.23	1:45.27; 40.02	2:16.65; 31.38	13.27
7	1	(Pakistan) Nisar Ahmed (PAK)	0.81	29.50; 29.50	1:05.42; 35.92	1:45.70; 40.28	2:18.23; 32.53	14.85
DNS	6	(Singapore) Lee Yu Tan (SIN)						

=== Men's 200 m Individual Medley - Heat 02 ===
Pos.	Lane	Athlete	R.T.	50 m	100 m	150 m	200 m	Tbh.
1	4	(New Zealand) Dean Kent (NZL)	0.77	26.96; 26.96	58.01; 31.05	1:32.27; 34.26	2:02.65; 30.38	
2	5	(Barbados) Bradley Ally (BAR)	0.67	26.94; 26.94	57.91; 30.97	1:32.74; 34.83	2:02.67; 29.93	0.02
3	3	(Scotland) Euan Dale (SCO)	0.76	27.22; 27.22	59.90; 32.68	1:35.14; 35.24	2:04.35; 29.21	1.70
4	6	(Wales) Thomas Haffield (WAL)	0.82	28.59; 28.59	1:00.81; 32.22	1:39.02; 38.21	2:09.31; 30.29	6.66
5	7	(India) Rehan Poncha (IND)	0.93	28.13; 28.13	1:02.51; 34.38	1:42.38; 39.87	2:13.22; 30.84	10.57
6	2	(Bermuda) Graham Smith (BER)	0.73	27.98; 27.98	1:03.46; 35.48	1:42.48; 39.02	2:13.69; 31.21	11.04
7	1	(Guernsey) Ben Lowndes (GUE)	0.82	28.35; 28.35	1:03.76; 35.41	1:44.68; 40.92	2:17.65; 32.97	15.00
8	8	(Mauritius) Gael Adam (MRI)	0.86	30.14; 30.14	1:04.50; 34.36	1:53.29; 48.79	2:26.94; 33.65	24.29

=== Men's 200 m Individual Medley - Heat 03 ===
Pos.	Lane	Athlete	R.T.	50 m	100 m	150 m	200 m	Tbh.
1	4	(Australia) Leith Brodie (AUS)	0.81	26.20; 26.20	57.78; 31.58	1:33.24; 35.46	2:02.74; 29.50	
2	5	(Scotland) Gregor Tait (SCO)	0.88	26.64; 26.64	56.77; 30.13	1:32.31; 35.54	2:02.79; 30.48	0.05
3	6	(The Bahamas) Jeremy Knowles (BAH)	0.73	26.37; 26.37	58.69; 32.32	1:33.94; 35.25	2:03.16; 29.22	0.42
4	7	(Jersey) Daniel Halksworth (JER)	0.83	28.51; 28.51	1:01.62; 33.11	1:39.84; 38.22	2:11.15; 31.31	8.41
5	2	(Cayman Islands) Andrew Mackay (CAY)	0.64	27.79; 27.79	1:01.91; 34.12	1:41.93; 40.02	2:12.16; 30.23	9.42
6	1	(Gibraltar) Colin Bensadon (GIB)	0.93	29.01; 29.01	1:04.62; 35.61	1:42.91; 38.29	2:14.07; 31.16	11.33
7	8	(Kenya) Amar Shah (KEN)	0.78	28.91; 28.91	1:06.78; 37.87	1:44.11; 37.33	2:18.58; 34.47	15.84
DNS	3	(South Africa) Ryk Neethling (RSA)						

Note: Shah's 2:18.58 was a new Kenya Record
