= 2014 Pan Pacific Swimming Championships – Men's 4 × 200 metre freestyle relay =

Men's 4 × 200 metre freestyle relay at the 2014 Pan Pacific Swimming Championships
- Venue: Gold Coast Aquatic Centre
- Dates: August 22, 2014 (heats & finals)
- Winning time: 7:05.17

Medalists
gold medal	Conor Dwyer, Michael Phelps, Ryan Lochte, and Matt McLean	United States
silver medal	Kosuke Hagino, Reo Sakata, Yuki Kobori, and Takeshi Matsuda	Japan
bronze medal	David McKeon, Cameron McEvoy, Mack Horton, and Thomas Fraser-Holmes	Australia

The men's 4 × 200 metre freestyle relay competition at the 2014 Pan Pacific Swimming Championships took place on August 22 at the Gold Coast Aquatic Centre. The last champion was the United States.

This race consisted of sixteen lengths of the pool. Each of the four swimmers completed four lengths of the pool. The first swimmer had to touch the wall before the second could leave the starting block.

== Records ==
Prior to this competition, the existing world and Pan Pacific records were as follows:

World record	United States (USA); Michael Phelps (1:44.49); Ricky Berens (1:44.13); David Walters (1:45.47); Ryan Lochte (1:44.46)	6:58.55	Rome, Italy	July 31, 2009
Pan Pacific Championships record	United States (USA); Michael Phelps (1:45.62); Peter Vanderkaay (1:46.46); Ricky Berens (1:46.49); Ryan Lochte (1:45.27)	7:03.84	Irvine, United States	August 19, 2010

== Results ==
All times are in minutes and seconds.

KEY:	q	Fastest non-qualifiers	Q	Qualified	CR	Championships record	NR	National record	PB	Personal best	SB	Seasonal best

=== Heats ===
Heats weren't performed, as only five teams had entered.

=== Final ===
The final was held on August 22, at 21:20.

Rank	Name	Nationality	Time	Notes
1st place, gold medalist(s)	Conor Dwyer (1:47.08); Michael Phelps (1:46.08); Ryan Lochte (1:45.57); Matt McLean (1:46.44)	United States	7:05.17	
2nd place, silver medalist(s)	Kosuke Hagino (1:46.13); Reo Sakata (1:45.78); Yuki Kobori (1:46.81); Takeshi Matsuda (1:46.58)	Japan	7:05.30	
3rd place, bronze medalist(s)	David McKeon (1:46.85); Cameron McEvoy (1:48.12); Mack Horton (1:47.06); Thomas Fraser-Holmes (1:46.52)	Australia	7:08.55	
4	Matthew Stanley (1:47.09) NR; Dylan Dunlop-Barrett (1:48.98); Steven Kent (1:48.89); Mitchell Donaldson (1:48.87)	New Zealand	7:13.83	NR
5	Kent Cheung (1:55.77); Chun Nam Ng (1:55.87); Kei Koi Kong (1:54.75); David Wong (1:55.35)	Hong Kong	7:41.74	
