= Swimming at the 2006 Commonwealth Games – Men's 400 metre individual medley =

== Men's 400 m Individual Medley - Final ==
Pos.	Lane	Athlete	R.T.	50 m	100 m	150 m	200 m	250 m	300 m	350 m	400 m	Tbh.
	6	David Carry (SCO)	0.83	27.51; 27.51	59.10; 31.59	1:32.39; 33.29	2:05.23; 32.84	2:41.03; 35.80	3:18.48; 37.45	3:47.50; 29.02	4:15.98 (GR); 28.48	
	4	Euan Dale (SCO)	0.76	27.34; 27.34	58.90; 31.56	1:32.56; 33.66	2:05.88; 33.32	2:41.65; 35.77	3:18.23; 36.58	3:48.25; 30.02	4:17.15; 28.90	1.17
	2	Travis Nederpelt (AUS)	0.80	27.43; 27.43	57.90; 30.47	1:32.40; 34.50	2:06.58; 34.18	2:42.07; 35.49	3:17.41; 35.34	3:48.52; 31.11	4:17.24; 28.72	1.26
4	3	Dean Kent (NZL)	0.76	27.27; 27.27	58.72; 31.45	1:32.41; 33.69	2:06.01; 33.60	2:41.80; 35.79	3:18.42; 36.62	3:48.82; 30.40	4:18.20; 29.38	2.22
5	7	Bradley Ally (BAR)	0.73	27.65; 27.65	59.39; 31.74	1:33.54; 34.15	2:06.53; 32.99	2:42.63; 36.10	3:20.10; 37.47	3:51.24; 31.14	4:21.13; 29.89	5.15
6	5	Thomas Haffield (WAL)	0.80	28.35; 28.35	1:00.42; 32.07	1:33.20; 32.78	2:05.90; 32.70	2:43.63; 37.73	3:22.21; 38.58	3:54.31; 32.10	4:25.79; 31.48	9.81
7	1	Jeremy Knowles (BAH)	0.77	27.83; 27.83	59.61; 31.78	1:35.06; 35.45	2:09.87; 34.81	2:47.88; 38.01	3:26.02; 38.14	3:56.95; 30.93	4:26.72; 29.77	10.74
8	8	Shaune Fraser (CAY)	0.78	28.02; 28.02	59.69; 31.67	1:34.65; 34.96	2:09.05; 34.40	2:47.91; 38.86	3:28.15; 40.24	3:58.91; 30.76	4:29.00; 30.09	13.02

== Men's 400 m Individual Medley - Heats ==
=== Men's 400 m Individual Medley - Heat 01 ===
Pos.	Lane	Athlete	R.T.	50 m	100 m	150 m	200 m	250 m	300 m	350 m	400 m	Tbh.
1	3	Thomas Haffield (WAL)	0.81	28.61; 28.61	1:01.21; 32.60	1:34.23; 33.02	2:06.79; 32.56	2:44.29; 37.50	3:22.89; 38.60	3:53.87; 30.98	4:22.69; 28.82	
2	5	Dean Kent (NZL)	0.78	27.23; 27.23	58.73; 31.50	1:34.10; 35.37	2:08.56; 34.46	2:44.53; 35.97	3:21.38; 36.85	3:53.36; 31.98	4:22.75; 29.39	0.06
3	4	David Carry (SCO)	0.86	28.06; 28.06	1:00.45; 32.39	1:35.15; 34.70	2:08.51; 33.36	2:46.47; 37.96	3:24.55; 38.08	3:54.37; 29.82	4:23.10; 28.73	0.41
4	6	Shaune Fraser (CAY)	0.80	27.60; 27.60	59.65; 32.05	1:34.50; 34.85	2:09.12; 34.62	2:48.23; 39.11	3:28.59; 40.36	3:59.16; 30.57	4:29.26; 30.10	6.57
5	2	Daniel Halksworth (JER)	0.84	29.35; 29.35	1:02.90; 33.55	1:37.57; 34.67	2:11.14; 33.57	2:49.64; 38.50	3:28.76; 39.12	4:01.40; 32.64	4:32.50; 31.10	9.81
DSQ	7	Colin Bensadon (GIB)										

=== Men's 400 m Individual Medley - Heat 02 ===
Pos.	Lane	Athlete	R.T.	50 m	100 m	150 m	200 m	250 m	300 m	350 m	400 m	Tbh.
1	5	Euan Dale (SCO)	0.78	27.62; 27.62	59.47; 31.85	1:33.84; 34.37	2:07.20; 33.36	2:43.36; 36.16	3:20.06; 36.70	3:50.93; 30.87	4:21.88; 30.95	
2	4	Travis Nederpelt (AUS)	0.84	27.85; 27.85	59.10; 31.25	1:34.04; 34.94	2:08.42; 34.38	2:44.81; 36.39	3:20.60; 35.79	3:53.26; 32.66	4:24.63; 31.37	2.75
3	3	Bradley Ally (BAR)	0.78	27.66; 27.66	59.53; 31.87	1:33.45; 33.92	2:06.71; 33.26	2:43.82; 37.11	3:22.00; 38.18	3:54.49; 32.49	4:24.94; 30.45	3.06
4	6	Jeremy Knowles (BAH)	0.75	27.84; 27.84	1:00.13; 32.29	1:36.21; 36.08	2:11.12; 34.91	2:48.83; 37.71	3:26.75; 37.92	3:57.32; 30.57	4:27.40; 30.08	5.52
5	7	Rehan Poncha (IND)	0.98	28.84; 28.84	1:01.99; 33.15	1:38.54; 36.55	2:14.71; 36.17	2:57.20; 42.49	3:40.65; 43.45	4:14.37; 33.72	4:46.79; 32.42	24.91
6	2	Andrew Mackay (CAY)	0.65	30.06; 30.06	1:04.90; 34.84	1:42.80; 37.90	2:21.17; 38.37	3:02.93; 41.76	3:44.95; 42.02	4:18.72; 33.77	4:51.76; 33.04	29.88
7	1	Nisar Ahmed (PAK)	0.91	30.14; 30.14	1:04.01; 33.87	1:43.05; 39.04	2:21.70; 38.65	3:03.90; 42.20	3:47.75; 43.85	4:22.93; 35.18	4:57.55; 34.62	35.67
