= Matt McLean =

American swimmer (born 1988)

Personal information
- Full name: Matthew McLean
- National team: United States
- Born: May 13, 1988 (age 38) Cleveland, Ohio, U.S.
- Home town: Sterling, Virginia, U.S.
- Height: 6 ft 7 in (2.01 m)
- Weight: 265 lb (120 kg)

Sport
- Sport: Swimming
- Strokes: Freestyle
- Club: North Baltimore Aquatic Club
- College team: University of Virginia
Medal record
Men's swimming
Representing the United States
Olympic Games
Gold medal – first place	2012 London	4×200 m freestyle
World Championships (LC)
Gold medal – first place	2013 Barcelona	4×200 m freestyle
World Championships (SC)
Gold medal – first place	2012 Istanbul	4×200 m freestyle
Gold medal – first place	2014 Doha	4×200 m freestyle
Pan Pacific Championships
Gold medal – first place	2014 Gold Coast	4×200 m freestyle
Summer Universiade
Gold medal – first place	2011 Shenzhen	200 m freestyle
Gold medal – first place	2011 Shenzhen	4×200 m freestyle

Matthew McLean (born May 13, 1988) is an American competition swimmer who has been a member of several winning U.S. teams in freestyle relay events. He was a member of the 2012 United States Olympic team, and earned a gold medal as a member of the winning U.S. team in the 4×200-meter freestyle relay at the 2012 Summer Olympics.

== Early years ==
McLean was born in Cleveland, Ohio. He grew up in Sterling, Virginia, and attended Potomac Falls High School in Sterling, where he was a member of the Potomac Falls Panthers swim team. McLean won state championships in the 500-yard freestyle and twice in the 200-yard freestyle, and set a new state record in the 200.

== College career ==
He received an athletic scholarship to attend the University of Virginia, and swam for the Virginia Cavaliers swimming and diving team in National Collegiate Athletic Association (NCAA) competition from 2008 to 2011. During his four years as a UVA swimmer, he won seventeen Atlantic Coast Conference (ACC) championships, and received fifteen All-American honors. He was recognized as the ACC Freshman of the Year in 2008, ACC Swimmer of the Year in 2009 and 2011, and ACC Swimmer of the Championships in 2008, 2009 and 2011. As a senior in 2011, he won the NCAA national championship in the 500-yard freestyle with a time of 4:10.15. He graduated from Virginia with a bachelor's degree in sociology in 2011.

== Professional career ==
After graduating from the University of Virginia, McLean began training under coach Jon Urbanchek as a member of the Fullerton Aquatics Sports Team (FAST) in California. In August 2011, McLean won the USA Swimming National championship in the 400-meter freestyle with a time of 3:47.33. He was also part of the Duel in the Pool 2011 team, taking second place in the 200-meter freestyle and third place in the 400-meter freestyle events.

At the 2012 U.S. Olympic Trials, the qualifying meet for the Olympics, McLean made the Olympic team for the first time by finishing fifth in the 200-meter freestyle with a time of 1:46.78, which qualified him to swim in the 4×200-meter freestyle as a member of the U.S. relay team. At the 2012 Summer Olympics in London, he earned a gold medal by swimming for the winning U.S. team in the preliminaries of the 4×200-meter freestyle relay.

Following his Olympic run, he won gold in the 4×200 freestyle relay at both the 2013 World Aquatics Championships and the short course version in 2014. Additionally, he won gold in the long course 4×200 freestyle relay in the 2014 Pan Pacific Swimming Championships. As of 2014, he is a member of the North Baltimore Aquatic Center.

== See also ==
- List of Olympic medalists in swimming (men)
- List of University of Virginia people
