= Swimming at the 2005 World Aquatics Championships – Men's 4 × 100 metre freestyle relay =

Men's 4×100m Free Relay at the 2005 FINA World Aquatics Championships
- Dates: July 24, 2005
- Nations: 24
- Winning time: 3:13.77

Medalists
gold medal	USA
silver medal	Canada
bronze medal	Australia

The Men's 4×100 Freestyle Relay event at the 2005 FINA World Aquatics Championships was swum on July 24, 2005 in Montreal, Quebec, Canada. 24 teams swam in preliminary heats in the day's morning session, with the top-8 teams from the prelims advancing to swim again in the final heat in the day's evening session.

At the start of the event, the existing World (WR) and Championships (CR) records were:

- WR: 3:13.17, South Africa (Schoeman, Ferns, Townsend, Neethling), swum August 15, 2004 in Athens, Greece
- CR: 3:14.06, Russia (Kapralov, Usov, Pimankov, Popov), swum July 20, 2003 in Barcelona, Spain

== Results ==
=== Final ===
Place	Lane	Nation	Swimmers	Time	Notes
1	4	(United States) USA	Michael Phelps (49.17); Neil Walker (47.70); Nate Dusing (48.97); Jason Lezak (47.93)	3:13.77	CR
2	5	Canada	Yannick Lupien (49.88); Rick Say (48.85); Mike Mintenko (49.52); Brent Hayden (48.19 )	3:16.44	NR
3	3	Australia	Michael Klim (49.75); Andrew Mewing (49.04); Leith Brodie (49.82); Patrick Murphy (48.95)	3:17.56	
4	2	Lithuania	Paulius Viktoravičius (50.49); Vytautas Janušaitis (49.34); Saulius Binevičius (49.28); Rolandas Gimbutis (48.78 )	3:17.89	
5	7	Sweden	Jonas Persson (50.45); Stefan Nystrand (48.58); Lars Frölander (49.25); Petter Stymne (49.67)	3:17.95	
6	1	Germany	Stefan Herbst (49.83); Jens Schreiber (49.41); Leif-Marten Kruger (49.78); Marco di Carli (49.10)	3:18.12	
7	6	Russia	Andrey Kapralov (49.64); Yevgeny Lagunov (48.89); Denis Pimankov (49.92); Ivan Usov (49.99)	3:18.44	
8	8	Netherlands	Mark Veens (50.04); Bas Van Velthoven (50.20); Stefan Oosting (50.08); Mitja Zastrow (49.02)	3:19.34	

=== Preliminaries ===
Rank	Heat+Lane	Nation	Swimmers (split)	Time	Notes
1	H2 L4	United States	Ben Wildman-Tobriner (50.16), Nate Dusing (48.92), Garrett Weber-Gale (48.67), Neil Walker (48.29)	3:16.04	q
2	H3 L3	Canada	Yannick Lupien (49.71), Rick Say (49.24), Mike Mintenko (49.62), Brent Hayden (48.23)	3:16.80	q
3	H2 L5	Australia	Andrew Mewing (49.83), Michael Klim (48.78), Leith Brodie (49.81), Patrick Murphy (49.21)	3:17.63	q
4	H3 L5	Russia	Andrey Kapralov (49.60), Evgeny Lagunov (48.55), Denis Pimankov (50.05), Ivan Usov (50.02)	3:18.22	q
5	H1 L3	Lithuania	Paulis Viktoravicius (50.67), Vytautas Janušaitis (49.22), Saulis Binevicius (49.90), Rolandas Gimbutis (48.78)	3:18.57	q
6	H2 L2	Sweden	Jonas Persson (50.59), Stefan Nystrand (48.79), Lars Frölander (49.21), Petter Stymne (50.02)	3:18.61	q
7	H1 L5	Germany	Marco di Carli (50.43), Leif-Marten Kruger (49.91), Stefan Herbst (49.01), Jens Schreiber (49.52)	3:18.87	q
8	H3 L4	Netherlands	Mark Veens (50.33), Bas van Velthoven (49.68), Stefan Oosting (49.73), Mitja Zastrow (49.19)	3:18.93	q
9	H1 L4	Italy	Christian Galenda (49.79), Michele Scarica (50.18), Alessandro Calvi (49.64), David Berbotto (49.51)	3:19.12	
10	H2 L6	Japan	Daisuke Hosokawa (50.20), Yoshihiro Okumura (49.90), Makoto Ito (50.64), Hisayoshi Sato (48.53)	3:19.27	
11	H2 L3	Ukraine	Pavlo Khnykin (50.61), Denys Syzonenko (49.99), Oleksandr Volynets (50.74), Yuri Yegoshin (49.55)	3:20.89	
12	H2 L8	Slovenia	Peter Mankoč (49.22), Jernej Godec (50.14), Jernej Mencinger (51.32), Blaž Medvešek (50.30)	3:20.98	
13	H3 L6	Algeria	Nabil Kebbab (50.11), Aghiles Slimani (51.47), Mahrez Mebarek (51.25), Salim Iles (49.63)	3:22.46	NR
14	H1 L6	Belarus	Andrei Radzionov (51.46), Yahor Salabutov (49.89 ), Mikalai Hancharov (51.05), Stanislav Neviarovski (50.51)	3:22.91	
15	H3 L2	Czech Republic	Martin Verner (50.81), Lukas Harnol (50.85), Martin Kresta (51.09), Ondrej Broda (50.28)	3:23.03	
16	H1 L2	Singapore	Bryan Tay (52.36), Jeffrey Su (54.43), Gary Tan (52.64), Mark Chay (52.21)	3:31.64	
17	H2 L1	Kuwait	Mohamed Madwa (52.82), Mohamed Al-Naser (53.61), Waleed Al-Qahtani (53.13), Mansoor Al-Mansoor (53.25)	3:32.81	
18	H2 L7	Barbados	Martyn Forde (53.35), Sean Dehere (53.58), Shawn Clarke (54.03), Terrence Haynes (52.43)	3:33.39	
19	H3 L7	Uzbekistan	Timur Irgashev (53.33), Ibrahim Nazarov (54.69), Sergey Tsoy (53.09), Danil Bugakov (52.86)	3:33.97	
20	H1 L7	Kenya	Jason Dunford (52.30), David Dunford (53.77), Rama Vyombo (55.82), Amar Shah (57.19)	3:39.08	
21	H3 L1	Senegal	Pape Madiop Ndong (57.82), Khaly Ciss (54.37), Madicke Mbengue (56.41), Malick Fall (54.43)	3:43.03	
22	H1 L1	Macau	Kuan Fong Lao (54.74), Chan Wai Ma (58.46), Chi Lon Lei (57.05), Wing Cheun Wong (53.05)	3:43.30	
23	H3 L8	Mongolia	Ganbold Urnultsaikhan (1:00.36), Khurlee Enkhmandakh (1:05.56), Bayarerdene Soninerdene (1:01.27), Andrei Tamir (56.50)	4:03.69	
-	H1 L8	Virgin Islands	Morgan Locke (53.88), Josh Laban (52.57), Kieran Locke, Kevin Hensley	DQ	
