= Yuki Kobori =

Japanese swimmer (born 1993)

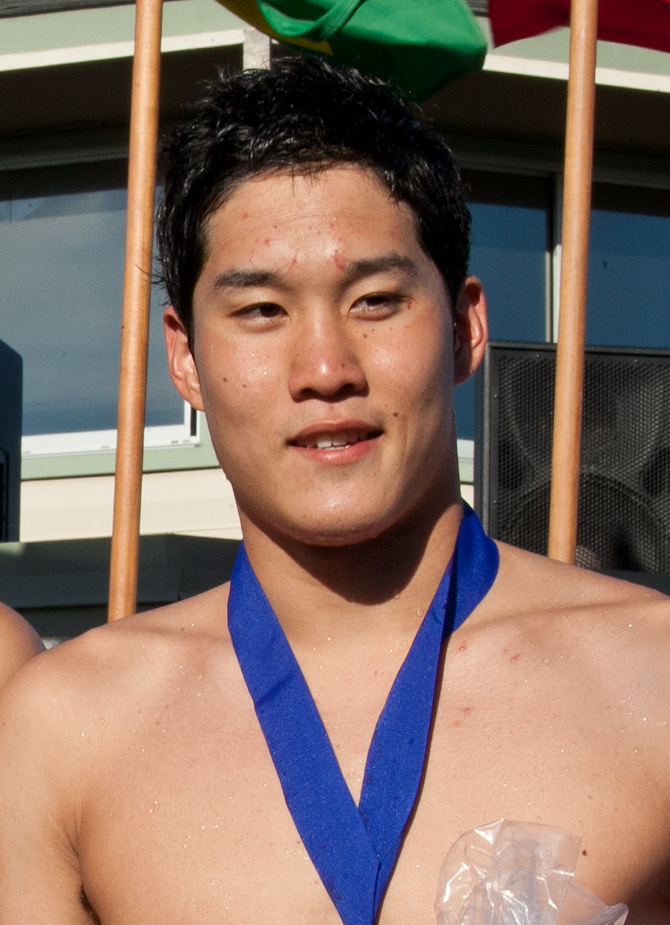
- Kobori in 2012

Personal information
- Nationality: Japanese
- Born: 25 November 1993 (age 32) Ishikawa, Japan
- Height: 183 cm (6 ft 0 in)
- Weight: 72 kg (159 lb)

Sport
- Sport: Swimming
- Strokes: Freestyle, Butterfly
Medal record
Men's swimming
Representing Japan
Olympic Games
Bronze medal – third place	2016 Rio de Janeiro	4×200 m freestyle
World Championships (SC)
Silver medal – second place	2016 Windsor	4×200 m freestyle
Pan Pacific Championships
Silver medal – second place	2010 Irvine	4×200 m freestyle
Silver medal – second place	2014 Gold Coast	4×200 m freestyle
Silver medal – second place	2018 Tokyo	4×100 m medley
Bronze medal – third place	2018 Tokyo	4×200 m freestyle
Asian Games
Gold medal – first place	2014 Incheon	4×200 m freestyle
Gold medal – first place	2018 Jakarta	4×200 m freestyle
Silver medal – second place	2018 Jakarta	4×100 m medley
Bronze medal – third place	2018 Jakarta	100 m butterfly
Summer Universiade
Gold medal – first place	2017 Taipei	4×200 m freestyle
Bronze medal – third place	2017 Taipei	4×100 m medley

Yuki Kobori (小堀 勇氣, Kobori Yūki; born 25 November 1993) is a Japanese competitive swimmer. He competed in the men's 4 × 200 metre freestyle relay at the 2012 and 2016 Summer Olympics, winning a bronze medal in the latter Games.
