= Travis Nederpelt =

Australian swimmer

Personal information
- Full name: Travis Nederpelt
- National team: Australia
- Born: 10 June 1985 (age 41) Perth, Australia
- Height: 1.84 m (6 ft 0 in)
- Weight: 75 kg (165 lb)

Sport
- Sport: Swimming
- Strokes: Butterfly, medley
Medal record
Commonwealth Games
Silver medal – second place	2006 Melbourne	200m butterfly
Bronze medal – third place	2006 Melbourne	400m medley
Pan Pacific Championships
Silver medal – second place	2006 Victoria	10km open water

Travis Nederpelt (born 10 June 1985) is an Australian former competition swimmer from Perth and butterfly specialist who represented his country at the 2004 Summer Olympics at Athens and in 2008 Summer Olympics in Beijing. His best Olympic performance was 8th in the final of the men's 400m individual medley at Athens.

Nederpelt is a record eight-time winner of the popular Swim Thru Rottnest event.

His brother Jarrad Nederpelt is also a competitive club swimmer with whom he holds the current duo record for the Rottnest Channel Swim event, set in 2001.

In May 2012 at the age of 26, Nederpelt retired from competitive swimming, but continued to serve the sport as a coach.

He became a member of the Swimming WA Board in 2016, and in 2018 was inducted into the WA Swimming Hall of Fame.
