= Euan Dale =

Scottish swimmer (born 1985)

Personal information
- Full name: Euan Dale
- National team: Great Britain
- Born: 18 December 1985 (age 40) Edinburgh, Scotland
- Height: 1.83 m (6 ft 0 in)
- Weight: 74 kg (163 lb; 11.7 st)

Sport
- Sport: Swimming
- Strokes: Freestyle, medley
- Club: Loughborough University
Medal record
Men's swimming
Representing Scotland
Commonwealth Games
Silver medal – second place	2006 Melbourne	4x200 m freestyle
Silver medal – second place	2006 Melbourne	400 m medley

Euan Dale (born 18 December 1985) is a Scottish competitive swimmer who has represented Great Britain in the Olympics and Scotland in the Commonwealth Games. At the 2006 Commonwealth Games in Melbourne, he was a member of the second-place Scottish men's team in the 4×200-metre freestyle relay, for which he won a silver medal. Individually, Dale won a silver in the men's 400-metre individual medley.

At the 2008 Summer Olympics in Beijing, he competed in the 400-metre individual relay swimming event.

Dale attended Millfield School (1997–2004) and studied Accounting and Finance at Loughborough University.
