= Patrick Murphy (swimmer) =

Australian swimmer, Olympic bronze medalist

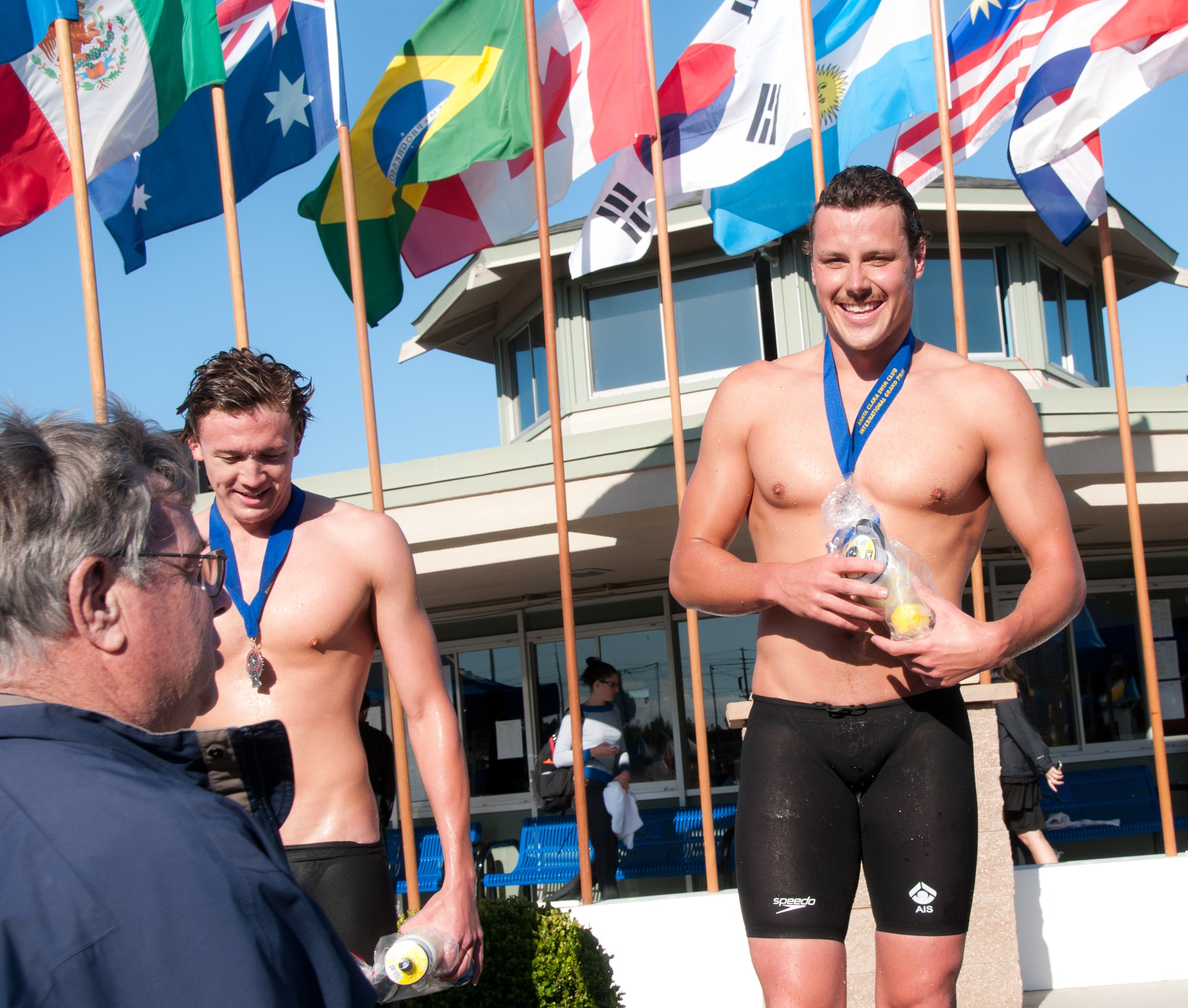

Personal information
- Full name: Patrick Murphy
- National team: Australia
- Born: 22 February 1984 (age 42) Albury
- Height: 1.90 m (6 ft 3 in)
- Weight: 88 kg (194 lb)

Sport
- Sport: Swimming
- Strokes: Freestyle, backstroke
- Club: MLC Aquatic, Melbourne Vicentre
Medal record
Men's swimming
Representing Australia
Olympic Games
Bronze medal – third place	2008 Beijing	4×100 m freestyle
Bronze medal – third place	2008 Beijing	4×200 m freestyle
World Championships (LC)
Silver medal – second place	2007 Melbourne	4×200 m freestyle
Bronze medal – third place	2005 Montreal	4×200 m freestyle
Bronze medal – third place	2005 Montreal	4×100 m freestyle
Bronze medal – third place	2009 Rome	4×200 m freestyle

Patrick Murphy (born 22 February 1984) is an Australian sprint freestyle and backstroke swimmer. He is an Australian relay team veteran since 2005. He has four FINA world championship medals and two Olympic bronze medals. He was an Australian Institute of Sport scholarship holder.

In April 2014, Murphy was named an Athlete Role Model for the 2014 Summer Youth Olympics in Nanjing, China.

== See also ==
- List of Olympic medalists in swimming (men)
