= Peter Vanderkaay =

American swimmer

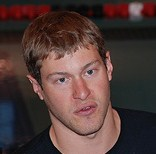

Personal information
- Full name: Peter William Vanderkaay
- Nickname: "PVK"
- National team: United States
- Born: February 12, 1984 (age 42) Royal Oak, Michigan, U.S.
- Occupation: Real estate consultant
- Height: 6 ft 4 in (193 cm)
- Weight: 209 lb (95 kg) (2008)

Sport
- Sport: Swimming
- Events: Relays; Middle & Distance freestyle
- Strokes: Freestyle
- Club: OLY SC (Oakland Live Y'ers); Gator Swim Club
- College team: University of Michigan
- Coach: Jon Urbanchek (U. Michigan)
Medal record
Men's swimming
Representing the United States
Event	1st	2nd	3rd
Olympic Games	2	0	2
World Championships (LC)	4	0	0
World Championships (SC)	0	1	0
Pan Pacific Championships	2	0	1
Universiade	0	1	2
Total	8	2	5
Olympic Games
Gold medal – first place	2004 Athens	4×200 m freestyle
Gold medal – first place	2008 Beijing	4×200 m freestyle
Bronze medal – third place	2008 Beijing	200 m freestyle
Bronze medal – third place	2012 London	400 m freestyle
World Championships (LC)
Gold medal – first place	2005 Montreal	4×200 m freestyle
Gold medal – first place	2007 Melbourne	4×200 m freestyle
Gold medal – first place	2009 Rome	4×200 m freestyle
Gold medal – first place	2011 Shanghai	4×200 m freestyle
World Championships (SC)
Silver medal – second place	2010 Dubai	4×200 m freestyle
Pan Pacific Championships
Gold medal – first place	2006 Victoria	4×200 m freestyle
Gold medal – first place	2010 Irvine	4×200 m freestyle
Bronze medal – third place	2010 Irvine	200 m freestyle
Universiade
Silver medal – second place	2003 Daegu	4×200 m freestyle
Bronze medal – third place	2003 Daegu	800 m freestyle
Bronze medal – third place	2003 Daegu	1500 m freestyle

Peter William Vanderkaay (born February 12, 1984) is an American former competition swimmer and four-time Olympic medalist who competed for the University of Michigan who specialized in middle and long distance freestyle events. He was a member of the United States Olympic team in 2004, 2008, and 2012, and won gold medals in the 4x200 meter freestyle relay at the 2004 Summer Olympics in Athens and the 2008 Summer Olympics in Beijing. He won bronze medals in the 200-meter freestyle at the 2008 Summer Olympics in Beijing and the 400-meter freestyle at the 2012 Summer Olympics in London.

== Rochester Adams High ==
Vanderkaay was born February 12, 1984 in Royal Oak, Michigan to Mark and Robin Vanderkaay. He grew up in Oakland Township, and attended Rochester Adams High School in Rochester Hills, where he was a member of the National Honor Society, an athletic scholar three times and graduated in 2002 while maintaining a 3.7 grade point average. Vanderkaay began swimming at the age of seven at the Rochester Hills Tennis and Swim Club with his older brother Christian, who for many years outperformed him, and excelled in butterfly and breaststroke events.

He trained and competed with the Oakland Live Y'ers Club (OLY), under Jeff Cooper by his Senior year, in addition to swimming for his High School. At Rochester Adams High, he received varsity letters in each of his four years with the team. In both 2001 and 2002, he was a Michigan state champion in the 500-yard freestyle, and as a Senior in 2002 was a state champion in the 200-yard freestyle. Vanderkaay was a 2002 National Public School champion in the 500-yard freestyle. As a Junior he finished third in the state in the 200-yard freestyle. He placed eighth in the state in 2000, in the 500-yard free, and was a state record holder in the event. By his Senior year, he was rated first in the nation in the 200-yard freestyle, and third in the 500-yard freestyle, was a two-time MVP, and had served as team captain at Rochester Adams.

== Family ==
He has three brothers, all of whom are competitive swimmers. His older brother Christian swam for the University of Michigan and qualified for the 100-meter breaststroke at the 2008 Olympic trials. His younger brother Alex qualified for the 2008 Olympic trials in several events, competing and making the finals in the 400-meter individual medley, 200-meter butterfly and the 200-meter medley. His third and youngest brother, Dane, also qualified for the 2008 US Olympic trials in the 400-meter freestyle.

Vanderkaay and his family are supporters and volunteers for the YMCA's Detroit SWIMS initiative with a goal to teach every child in the City of Detroit to swim by the fifth grade.

Vanderkaay threw out the ceremonial first pitch at a Detroit Tigers baseball game on September 4, 2012.

== University of Michigan ==
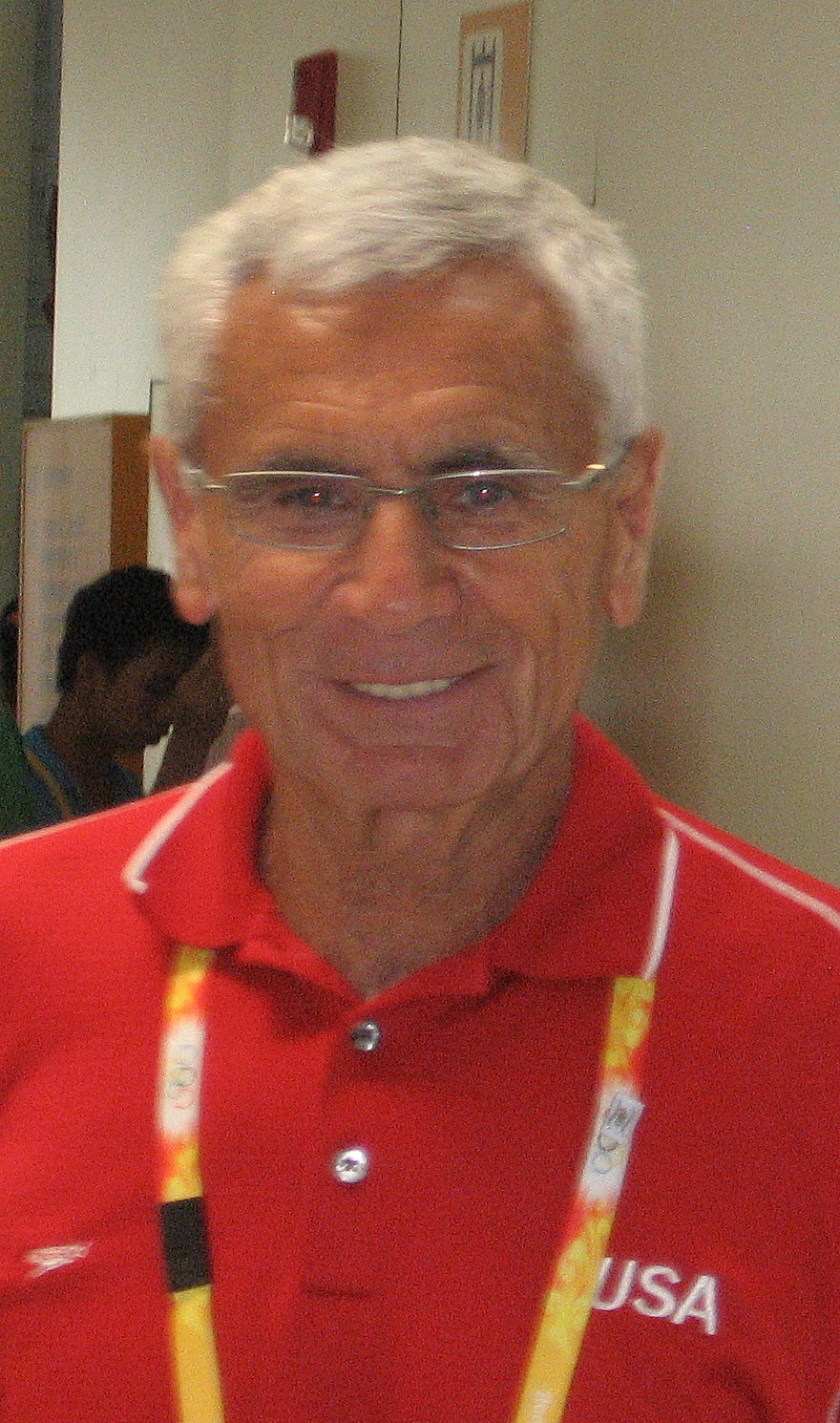
Coach J. Urbanchek

Enrolling in the Fall of 2002 to the College of Literature, Science and the Arts, with a major in biology, and graduating in 2006, Vanderkaay swam for the Michigan Wolverines swimming and diving team at the University of Michigan in Ann Arbor, Michigan. He was trained and managed at Michigan by Hall of Fame Head Coach Jon Urbanchek, who had specialized in distance swimming while competing for Michigan from 1959 to 1961, where he was ranked second nationally in the one mile freestyle event and was on two NCAA championship teams. Urbancheck's background as a collegiate freestyle distance swimmer would aid him in directing Vanderkaay's pursuit of the same specialty. In total, Vanderkaay captured five NCAA titles and 14 Big Ten Conference titles during his swimming tenure with Michigan. In his first year of collegiate competition, he was a Big Ten Champion in the 500-yard freestyle and the 800-yard freestyle relay. He also was a College Swimming Coaches Association of America (CSCAA) All-American in the 500 and the mile.

By the end of his second year at Michigan, Vanderkaay won four more Big Ten titles in the 400-yard IM, 500-yard freestyle, 1,650 freestyle and 800-yard freestyle relay. In short course metric distances, Vanderkaay also was the NCAA champion in the 400-meter free, the 1,500-meter free and the 800-meter free relay, and placed fifth in the 200-meter free.

In his junior year, Vanderkaay repeated his four Big Ten victories, and was named Big Ten Swimmer of the Year. He was named All-American in the 200-yard freestyle, 500-yard freestyle, 1,650-yard freestyle, 800-yard freestyle relay, 400-yard medley relay. In his senior year at Michigan, he was the senior co-captain for the Michigan Wolverines. He won four more Big Ten titles, 200-yard freestyle, 500-yard freestyle, 1,650-yard freestyle and 800-yard freestyle relay, and one final NCAA title in the 500. Vanderkaay also placed second in both the 200-yard and 1,650-yard freestyle events at the NCAA national championships.

== 2004-2012 Olympics ==
At the 2004 Summer Olympics, in Athens, Greece, Vanderkaay was a member of the 4×200-meter freestyle relay team, along with Michael Phelps, Ryan Lochte, and Klete Keller, swimming a combined time of 7:07.33 in the finals, finishing only .13 seconds ahead of the favored Australian team of Ian Thorpe, Grant Hackett, Michael Klim, and Nicholas Sprenger that swam a 7:07.46. Vanderkay on the third leg of the relay final helped push out the American relay team's lead a little, after Phelps established a one-second lead in the opening leg.

Vanderkaay won his first individual medal, a bronze, in the 200-meter freestyle at the 2008 Summer Olympics in Beijing, China 1:45.14. Vanderkaay also took a gold medal as part of the 4×200-meter freestyle relay that set the world record as the American team finished first with a time of 6:58.56. The Americans were the first team to break the seven-minute mark in the relay, and broke the previous record, set in Melbourne by more than four and a half seconds. Vanderkay also placed 4th in the finals of the 400-meter freestyle with a time of 3:43.11, and eleventh in the 1,500-meter freestyle with a time of 14:52.11, not making the finals.

At the 2012 United States Olympic Trials in Omaha, Nebraska, the qualifying event for the U.S. Olympic team, Vanderkaay won the 400-meter freestyle event with a time of 3:47.67, thus qualifying to represent the United States in the event at the 2012 Olympics. He also competed in the 1,500-meter freestyle, but placed fourth. At the 2012 Summer Olympics in London, as U.S. Olympic team Captain, Vanderkaay won a bronze medal in the 400-meter freestyle with a time of 3:44.69, finishing third behind Sun Yang and Park Tae-Hwan.

== International competition ==
In early competition, Vanderkaay won a silver and two bronze medals representing the US at the 2003 World University Games.

At the 2005 World Aquatics Championships in Montreal, Quebec, Vanderkaay won a gold medal in the 4×200-meter freestyle relay. Along with Phelps, Lochte, and Keller, their time of 7:06.58 was an American record.

At the 2007 World Aquatics Championships in Melbourne, Australia, Vanderkaay again swam in the relay with Lochte, Phelps, Keller. They set a world record in the 4×200-meter freestyle relay with a time of 7:03.24.

In the summer of 2007, Vanderkaay posted a career performance at U.S. Nationals, beating Michael Phelps for first place in the 400-meter freestyle. He also teamed up with Phelps, Davis Tarwater, Scott Spann, and Chris DeJong to win two more golds, one in the 4×100-meter freestyle relay and another in the 4×100-meter medley relay.

On December 20, 2010, Vanderkaay announced that he would be leaving Ann Arbor and Club Wolverine, where he had trained for over eight years, to move to Gainesville, Florida and train with the Gator Swim Club. The Gator Swim Club is affiliated with the University of Florida and is coached by Gregg Troy, the head coach of the 2012 U.S. Olympic men's team, and is home to several elite swimmers including Ryan Lochte, Conor Dwyer and Elizabeth Beisel.

== Honors ==
As a Senior, Vanderkay received the University of Michigan's Eric Namesnik Memorial Award, and Frank Barnard Award, and was a co-Big Ten Swimmer of the Year. He was more recently admitted as a member of the University of Michigan Hall of Honor in 2023.

Peter has worked for Signature Associates, a real estate firm in the greater Detroit area, where he specialized in tenant representation, and owner sales and leasing. He had former experience working as a real estate consultant in the Detroit area. In December 2026 Vanderkay will be inducted into the Michigan Sports Hall of Fame.

== See also ==
- List of Olympic medalists in swimming (men)
- List of United States records in swimming
- List of University of Michigan alumni
- List of World Aquatics Championships medalists in swimming (men)
- Michigan Wolverines
- World record progression 4 × 200 metres freestyle relay
