= Nick Ffrost =

Australian swimmer

Personal information
- Full name: Nicholas David Ffrost
- Nickname: Nick
- National team: Australia
- Born: 14 August 1986 (age 39) Mackay, Queensland
- Height: 1.74 m (5 ft 9 in)
- Weight: 70 kg (154 lb)

Sport
- Sport: Swimming
- Strokes: Freestyle
Medal record
Men's swimming
Representing Australia
Olympic Games
| Bronze medal – third place | 2008 Beijing | 4×200 m freestyle |
World Championships (LC)
| Silver medal – second place | 2007 Melbourne | 4×200 m freestyle |
| Bronze medal – third place | 2009 Rome | 4×200 m freestyle |
World Championships (SC)
| Silver medal – second place | 2006 Shanghai | 4×200 m freestyle |
Pan Pacific Championships
| Bronze medal – third place | 2006 Victoria | 4×200 m freestyle |
| Bronze medal – third place | 2010 Irvine | 4×200 m freestyle |
Commonwealth Games
| Gold medal – first place | 2010 Delhi | 4×200 m freestyle |
| Bronze medal – third place | 2006 Melbourne | 4×200 m freestyle |
Universiade
| Bronze medal – third place | 2011 Shenzhen | 4×200 m freestyle |

Nicholas David Ffrost (born 14 August 1986) is an Australian freestyle swimmer and relay veteran who has contributed to the Australian 4×200-metre freestyle relay to capture eight international medals. He was an Australian Institute of Sport scholarship holder. Ffrost's first international meet was the 2006 Commonwealth Games in Melbourne, Ffrost competed in the 4×200-metre freestyle relay. He swam the first leg in the final to help Australia win the bronze medal. He went on to make the final in the individual 200-metre freestyle, finishing 8th place. He placed 11th in the 400-metre freestyle semi-finals, but did not advance to the finals.

At the 2007 World Aquatics Championships in Melbourne, Ffrost competed in the 4×200-metre freestyle relay. He swam the anchor leg in the heats to help Australia qualify second fastest. Australia went on to finish second in the final, although Ffrost was dropped for Patrick Murphy. He was selected in the squad for the 4×200-metre freestyle relay for the 2008 Summer Olympics in Beijing.

He helped Australia qualify sixth in the heats, and did well enough for the selectors to retain him for the final alongside former training partner Grant Brits. He swam the anchor leg as Australia took bronze. He returned to his relay duties in 2009 for the 2009 World Aquatics Championships, contributing another 200-metre freestyle leg for the 4×200-metre freestyle team, to capture bronze behind the Americans and Russians. In 2010, at the Telstra Australian championships, he won the 200-metre freestyle in the time of 1:47.50, he followed up with winning the same event at the Australian Short course Championships in July. He failed to make the individual finals at both Pan Pacific Championships and Commonwealth, however he picked up bronze at Pan Pacs and gold at the Commonwealth Games in the 4×200-metre freestyle relays.

== See also ==
- List of Olympic medalists in swimming (men)
