= André Schultz =

Brazilian swimmer (born 1988)

Personal information
- Nationality: Brazil
- Born: 16 July 1988 (age 37) Santa Bárbara d'Oeste, São Paulo, Brazil
- Height: 1.92 m (6 ft 4 in)
- Weight: 89 kg (196 lb)

Sport
- Sport: Swimming
- Strokes: Freestyle
Medal record
Men's swimming
Representing Brazil
Pan American Games
Silver medal – second place	2011 Guadalajara	4x200 m freestyle

André Schultz (born 16 July 1988) is a Brazilian swimmer.

Trained with Bob Bowman, coach of American swimmer Michael Phelps, at the University of Michigan. He is a childhood friend of César Cielo.

Participated at the 2006 Pan Pacific Swimming Championships, where he finished 6th in the 4×200-metre freestyle, 13th in the 200-metre individual medley, 14th in the 200-metre backstroke and 31st in the 200-metre freestyle.

At the 2010 Pan Pacific Swimming Championships, Schultz finished 5th in the 4×200-metre freestyle 14th in the 200-metre backstroke, and 15th in the 200-metre freestyle. He also finished 12th in the 200-metre individual medley heats, but did not swim the final

He joined the Brazilian national delegation who attended the 2011 World Aquatics Championships in Shanghai, China, where he finished 14th in the 4×200-metre freestyle.

At the 2011 Pan American Games in Guadalajara, he came in 7th place in 200-metre freestyle, and won the silver medal at the 4×200-metre freestyle.
