= Grant Brits =

South African-born competition swimmer

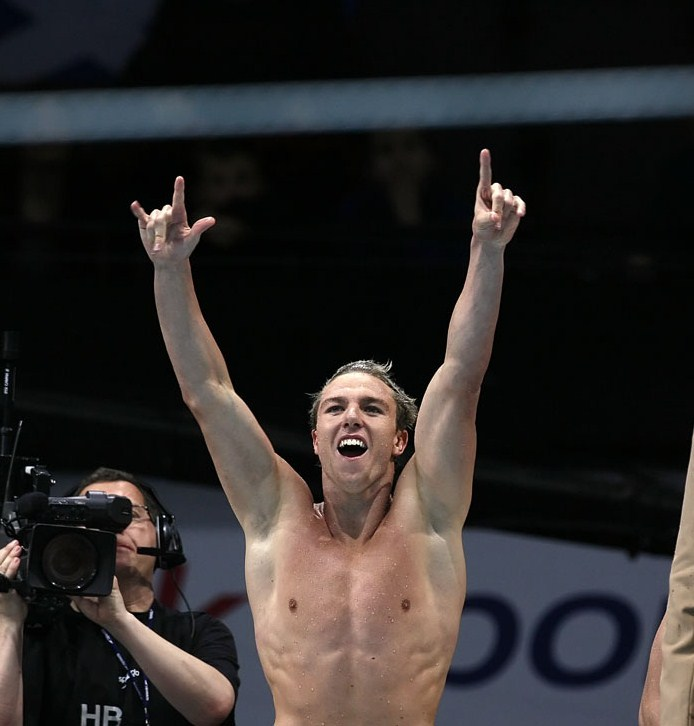

Personal information
- Full name: Grant Brits
- National team: Australia
- Born: 11 August 1987 (age 38) Johannesburg, South Africa
- Height: 1.88 m (6 ft 2 in)
- Weight: 80 kg (176 lb)

Sport
- Sport: Swimming
- Strokes: Freestyle
Medal record
Men's swimming
Representing Australia
Olympic Games
Bronze medal – third place	2008 Beijing	4x200 m freestyle
World Championships (LC)
Silver medal – second place	2007 Melbourne	4x200 m freestyle
World Championships (SC)
Gold medal – first place	2008 Manchester	4x200 m freestyle

Grant Brits (born 11 August 1987) is a South African-born competition swimmer who represented Australia at various international championship events including at the 2008 Summer Olympics in Beijing where he secured an Olympic bronze medal. Brits later worked in investment banking and finance, and as of 2018 ran the superannuation fund Superestate.

== Swimming career ==
=== Beijing Olympics 2008 ===
Brits was selected in the squad for the 4 × 200-metre freestyle relay for the 2008 Summer Olympics. He helped Australia qualify sixth in the heats where he was the fastest of the four heats swimmers. This effort resulted in the selectors deciding to retain him for the final of the 4 × 200-metre freestyle relay. He swam the third leg of the relay, the Australians managed to secure a surprise bronze in the event; handing Brits his first Olympic Medal.

=== Other swimming achievements ===
Brits also held a world record. In 2007 Brits was part of the team that set a new world record the 4 × 200 metre freestyle short-course relay. They completed the course in 6 min 52.66 s.

At the 2007 World Aquatics Championships in Melbourne, Brits competed in the 4 × 200 m freestyle relay. He swam the third leg in the heats, posting a time of 1 min 48.73 s to help Australia qualify second fastest for the final. He retained his position for the final, where he again swam the third leg. He maintained third place throughout his leg, and ended with a silver medal when Kenrick Monk overtook his Canadian counterpart on the anchor leg.

Brits' mother, Jeanette, swam for South Africa in the 1970s.

== Professional career ==
Grant Brits completed a Bachelor of Commerce and a Bachelor of Applied Finance at Macquarie University. After university Brits began his professional career in investment banking.

== See also ==
- List of Olympic medalists in swimming (men)
- World record progression 4 × 200 metres freestyle relay.
