= Andrew McMillan (swimmer) =

New Zealand swimmer

Personal information
- Born: April 2, 1985 (age 41)

Sport
- Sport: Swimming

Andrew McMillan (born 2 April 1985) is a New Zealand swimmer. He competed 4 x 200 metre freestyle and 4 × 100 metre medley relay events at the 2012 Summer Olympics.
