= Brent Hayden =

Canadian swimmer (born 1983)

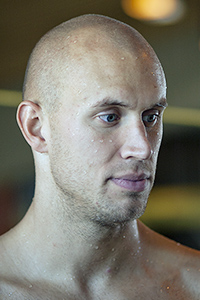

Personal information
- Full name: Brent Matthew Hayden
- Nickname: "Soup"
- National team: Canada
- Born: October 21, 1983 (age 42) Mission, British Columbia, Canada
- Education: University of British Columbia
- Height: 1.96 m (6 ft 5 in)
- Weight: 94 kg (207 lb)

Sport
- Sport: Swimming
- Strokes: Freestyle
- Club: Vancouver Pacific Swim Club
- College team: University of British Columbia
Medal record
Men's swimming
Representing Canada
Olympic Games
Bronze medal – third place	2012 London	100 m freestyle
World Championships (LC)
Gold medal – first place	2007 Melbourne	100 m freestyle
Silver medal – second place	2005 Montreal	4×100 m freestyle
Silver medal – second place	2005 Montreal	4×200 m freestyle
Silver medal – second place	2011 Shanghai	100 m freestyle
Bronze medal – third place	2007 Melbourne	4×200 m freestyle
Pan Pacific Championships
Gold medal – first place	2006 Victoria	100 m freestyle
Silver medal – second place	2006 Victoria	4×100 m freestyle
Silver medal – second place	2006 Victoria	4×200 m freestyle
Silver medal – second place	2010 Irvine	100 m freestyle
Bronze medal – third place	2002 Yokohama	4×100 m freestyle
Bronze medal – third place	2002 Yokohama	4×100 m medley
Bronze medal – third place	2006 Victoria	50 m freestyle
Bronze medal – third place	2010 Irvine	50 m freestyle
Commonwealth Games
Gold medal – first place	2010 Delhi	50 m freestyle
Gold medal – first place	2010 Delhi	100 m freestyle
Silver medal – second place	2006 Melbourne	50 m freestyle
Bronze medal – third place	2002 Manchester	4×100 m freestyle
Bronze medal – third place	2002 Manchester	4×100 m medley
Bronze medal – third place	2006 Melbourne	200 m freestyle
Bronze medal – third place	2006 Melbourne	4×100 m freestyle
Bronze medal – third place	2006 Melbourne	4×100 m medley

Brent Matthew Hayden (born October 21, 1983) is a Canadian retired competitive swimmer. Representing Canada for a decade, Hayden is regarded as the fastest swimmer in Canadian history. Hayden won a bronze medal in the 100 m freestyle at the 2012 Summer Olympics in London with a time of 47.80, and was world champion in the same event in 2007 with Filippo Magnini of Italy. By winning the 100 metre, Hayden became the first Canadian in 21 years to win a gold medal at the World Aquatics Championships, and was also the first Canadian to appear in the 100 metre final at the Olympics since Dick Pound at the 1960 Summer Olympics, and the first Canadian to win an Olympic medal in the 100 metre. Hayden added a further three silver and one bronze medal to his World Championship totals.

Hayden is currently the Canadian record-holder in the 200 metre and 100 metre in both the short-course and long-course. He has also held the world record in the 4×100 metre medley relay, and the 4×200 metre freestyle relay. Initially retiring after the London Olympics, Hayden returned to the pool seven years later to compete at the 2020 Summer Olympics in Tokyo.

== Career ==
=== 2004–2008: Athens to Beijing ===
Hayden's first Olympics were the 2004 Summer Olympics in Athens, as part of the Canadian swimming team. At the time Swimming Canada had been in a steady decline and wound up with no medals in Athens. It was a disappointing first Olympic appearance for Hayden, as inexperience took its toll on the 20-year-old. His best individual finish at the Games was thirteenth in the 200-metre freestyle event. It was further worsened when Hayden was mistaken for a protester and beaten up and arrested by the riot police because he was "tall and wearing a dark shirt" the night before the closing ceremonies, a week after his competition ended. The injuries sustained left him unable to compete at the World Short Course Championships which were being held a month later.

In Melbourne for the 2006 Commonwealth Games, Hayden won his first major international silver medal when he finished second in the 50 m freestyle, an event he had not intended on racing. He also added three bronze medals at the same games, two from the relays and one in the 200-metre freestyle final. Those medals were a premonition of the success to come at the 2007 World Aquatics Championships, where he tied for the gold medal with the Italian swimmer in the 100 m freestyle; this was the first World Championship for the Canadians since 1986. In the process of winning the gold, Hayden had also shaved down his own national record in the event down to 48.43 and he also added a bronze from the Worlds in the 4×200-metre freestyle relay. As a result of his victory, the mayor of Mission declared "Brent Hayden Day" on May 26, 2007. As well, the Mission Marlins renamed their swim meet to the "Brent Hayden Invitational" and a large mural, painted on the wall of the Mission Leisure Center, by artist Pascal A. Pelletier, was unveiled.

At the 2008 Summer Olympics in Beijing, he was a member of the Canadian team that finished sixth in the 4 × 100 m freestyle event and fifth in the 4 × 200 m freestyle relay event. Although he qualified third fastest out of sixteen swimmers, one place ahead of Michael Phelps, he did not compete in the semi-finals of the 200 m freestyle. Instead, his coach decided to rest him for the 4×100-metre freestyle, which was held that same day (Hayden set a Canadian record in the opening leg with a time of 47.56). He failed to qualify for the final in the 100 m freestyle despite being the incumbent World Champion in that event. While Hayden was promoted as the best Canadian swimmer at these games with his world title, only fellow long-distance freestyle Ryan Cochrane managed to medal for the nation in the pool, while the remainder of the swim team failed to make the podium despite a general improvement over their 2004 showing.

=== 2008–2012: London Olympics and retirement ===
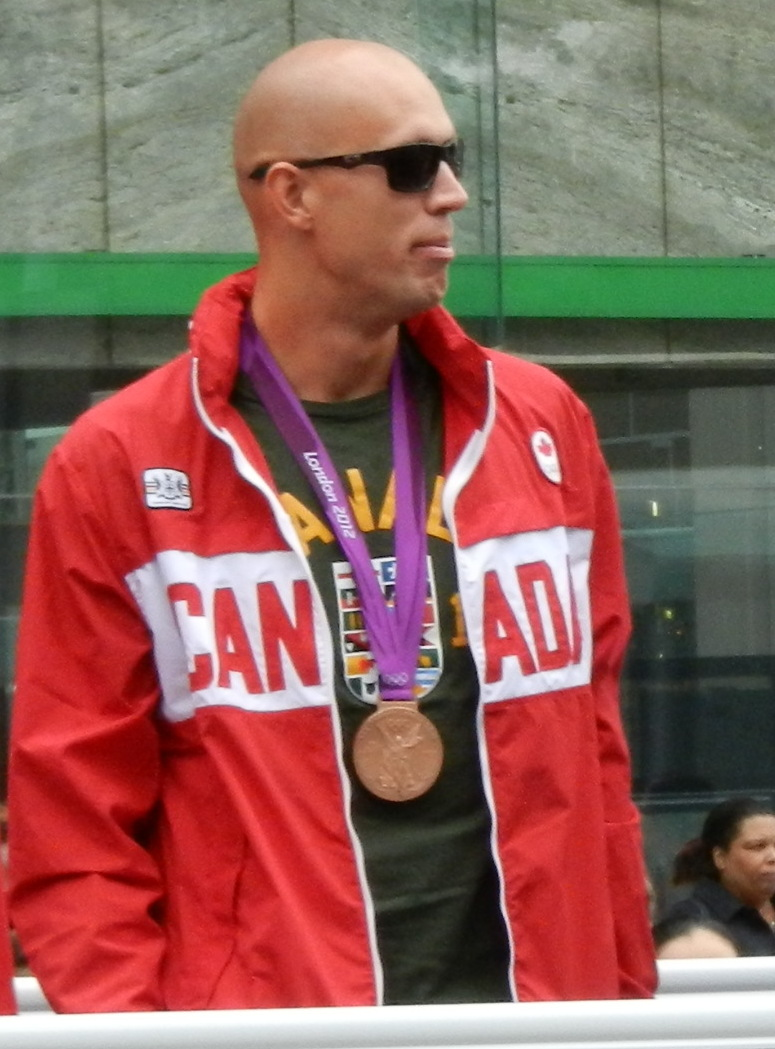
Hayden with his London 2012 bronze medal at the Olympic Heroes Parade in Toronto (September 2012)

Hayden attended the 2009 World Aquatics Championships. He failed in the defence of his world title in the 100 m freestyle, placing fourth with a new Canadian record time of 47.27 seconds and missing the podium by 0.02 seconds. César Cielo was the world champion, and set a new world mark of 46.91 seconds. Hayden was the only swimmer in the final to choose not to wear one of the newest "super suits". He chose to wear the Speedo LZR, which was the suit worn by most swimmers at the 2008 Beijing Olympics, whereas every other swimmer in that final was wearing either the new Arena X-Glide or Jaked (both of these suits are completely covered in polyurethane).

Hayden returned to form at the 2010 Commonwealth Games in Delhi, clocking the fastest times in his respective events (50 m freestyle, and 100 m freestyle); setting a Games record in the 100 m freestyle during day one, in the 4 × 100 m freestyle relay final and then breaking his Games record again, in the individual final with a time of 47.98 seconds—0.56 of a second ahead of the silver medallist, Simon Burnett. Hayden held the number one ranking in the world at the time in this event (also being ahead of 22-time Olympic medallist Michael Phelps). In the 50 m freestyle, he won gold with a Games record time of 22.01 seconds. The next season brought further success for Hayden as went on to touch out for the silver on a long glide in the 100 m freestyle final at the 2011 World Aquatics Championships. He had gone into the World Championships having set the previous world's best time the last season. His further successes came as Hayden was working on improving his starting 50 m as he was known more as a finisher in the last 50.

After disappointment at the previous two Olympics when he failed to qualify for the 100 m final, he became the first Canadian to do so in swimming's glamour event since Dick Pound in 1960. He went on to win bronze medal for Canada at the 2012 Summer Olympics in the 100 m freestyle after a strong start placed him in medal contention at the turn. Gold and silver went to American Nathan Adrian and world champion James Magnussen of Australia, while Hayden beat out Yannick Agnel and César Cielo for third; the medals were also presented by Dick Pound. Though only a bronze, the medal was a redemption for Hayden, who was visibly ecstatic at winning an Olympic medal at long last. With his Olympic medal finally in his possession, he said that "There are so many times when you can dream of something but a million out of a million and one times it won't come true. This was one of the things that I was very fortunate as a human being to have happen to me." Hayden announced his retirement from the sport after the 4×100-metre medley relay at the Olympics but said he believed in the Canadian swim team to thrive in the future, saying that "I think in the grand scheme of things, with the people we have, we've done an amazing job … As long as we keep that momentum building, I think we're going to see more success come from more diverse events."

=== 2020: Comeback ===
In the ensuing Olympic cycle, Swimming Canada would enjoy breakthrough success on the women's side, headlined by emerging talent Penny Oleksiak, but the men's team struggled greatly after the retirements of Hayden and Cochrane, and would earn no medals at the 2016 Summer Olympics in Rio de Janeiro.

Hayden was nevertheless inspired by the direction of the program, and after seven years away from the pool he announced a comeback in September 2019. After only 6 months of training, Hayden met the Olympic "A" Qualifying time with a 21.97 in the 50m freestyle at the TYR Pro Series in Des Moines, Iowa. The onset of the COVID-19 pandemic resulted in the 2020 Summer Olympics being delayed by a year, which Hayden would later credit with giving him more time to return to competitive form.

In 2021, Hayden won the 50 m freestyle at the Canadian Olympic Trials with a time of 21.82, well ahead of the FINA "A" standard of 22.01. This was his fourth time representing Canada at the Olympics. He opted not to contest the 100 m in Tokyo, as he and his coaches feared it might trigger back spasms. Hayden's return was widely credited for providing leadership to the men's program, with the most notable result being the surprise fourth-place finish in the 4 × 100 m freestyle relay where they were just 0.3 seconds behind the Australians who took the bronze medal, an event where the Canadian team had not been expected to even qualify for the final. Hayden swam a time of 47.99 in the leadoff of the relay, becoming by five years the oldest man to ever swim a time under 48 seconds. Hayden said afterward "this means that I made the right decision to come back." Hayden also competed in the 50 Metre Freestyle where he reached the semi-finals and just missed a final slot by 0.04 seconds, nonetheless it was his fastest time (post bodysuit), and his best-ever time in the event, leaving him to write on social media “It is such a weird state of confusion when you are torn between the pure competitor in you who realizes you missed the finals by 0.04 seconds and the human who realizes that … at 37 years of age, I came within only 0.04 seconds from the Olympic final.”.

== Personal life ==
Despite being a strong freestyle swimmer later in life, as a child he had to repeat his swimming lessons. He is known as "Soup" to his friends due to the superman tattoo he has on his chest. Hayden was born and raised in Mission, but resides in Vancouver. He attended the University of British Columbia where he studied. He also has a black belt in Isshin Ryu karate. After the London 2012 Games, Hayden flew to Lebanon and married Nadina Zarifeh, a singer/songwriter, on August 19.

Hayden appeared on CBC's television show Canada's Smartest Person as a competitor in 2014, but he did not win the title.

He and his wife Zarifeh created their own line of athletic lifestyle apparel, Astra Athletica, a business which they currently run.

Hayden has also pursued photography as a passion and has had several exhibitions.

Hayden retired from competitive swimming for the first time immediately after the 2012 Games, as he had suffered from back spasms and depression. He ran a swimming camp, and during one video filming session in Beirut in 2020, he did a sprint swim at the bequest of the camp kids and realized that his time was still competitive, convincing him to make a comeback.

== Other awards ==
- 2005 Canadian Swimmer of the Year
- 2005 BC Athlete of the Year (finalist)
- 2005 Canadian Partners of the Year
- 2006 Canadian Swimmer of the Year
- 2006 BC Athlete of the Year
- 2007 Canadian Swimmer of the Year
- 2007 BC Athlete of the Year
- 2007 Canadian Athlete of the Year
- 2012 Canadian Athlete of the Year (finalist)
- 2012 Queen's Diamond Jubilee Medal Recipient
- 2013 BC Sports Hall Of Fame Induction (Class of 2013)

== See also ==
- List of Canadian records in swimming
- List of Commonwealth Games medallists in swimming (men)
- List of Olympic medalists in swimming (men)
- World record progression 4 × 100 metres medley relay
- World record progression 4 × 200 metres freestyle relay
