= Andrew Mewing =

Australian swimmer

Personal information
- Full name: Andrew Mewing
- Nationality: Australia

Sport
- Sport: Swimming
- Strokes: Freestyle
Medal record
Men's swimming
Representing Australia
World Championships (LC)
| Silver medal – second place | 2007 Melbourne | 4×200 m freestyle |
| Bronze medal – third place | 2005 Montreal | 4×100 m freestyle |
| Bronze medal – third place | 2005 Montreal | 4×200 m freestyle |
Pan Pacific Championships
| Bronze medal – third place | 2006 Victoria | 4×100 m freestyle |
| Bronze medal – third place | 2006 Victoria | 4×200 m freestyle |

Andrew Mewing (born 1981) is a former national-team swimmer from Australia. He is also a past Executive member of the Australian Swimmers Association.

Mewing swam for Australia at:

- Commonwealth Games: 2006,
- World Championships: 2005, 2007
- Pan Pacs: 2006
- Short Course Worlds: 2004, 2006

In 2008, Mewing brought suit against Australia's national swimming federation, Swimming Australia, in an effort to get on Australia's Olympic team for Beijing.

Mewing is a co-founder and principal of Batch Mewing Lawyers.
