= Kenrick Monk =

Australian swimmer

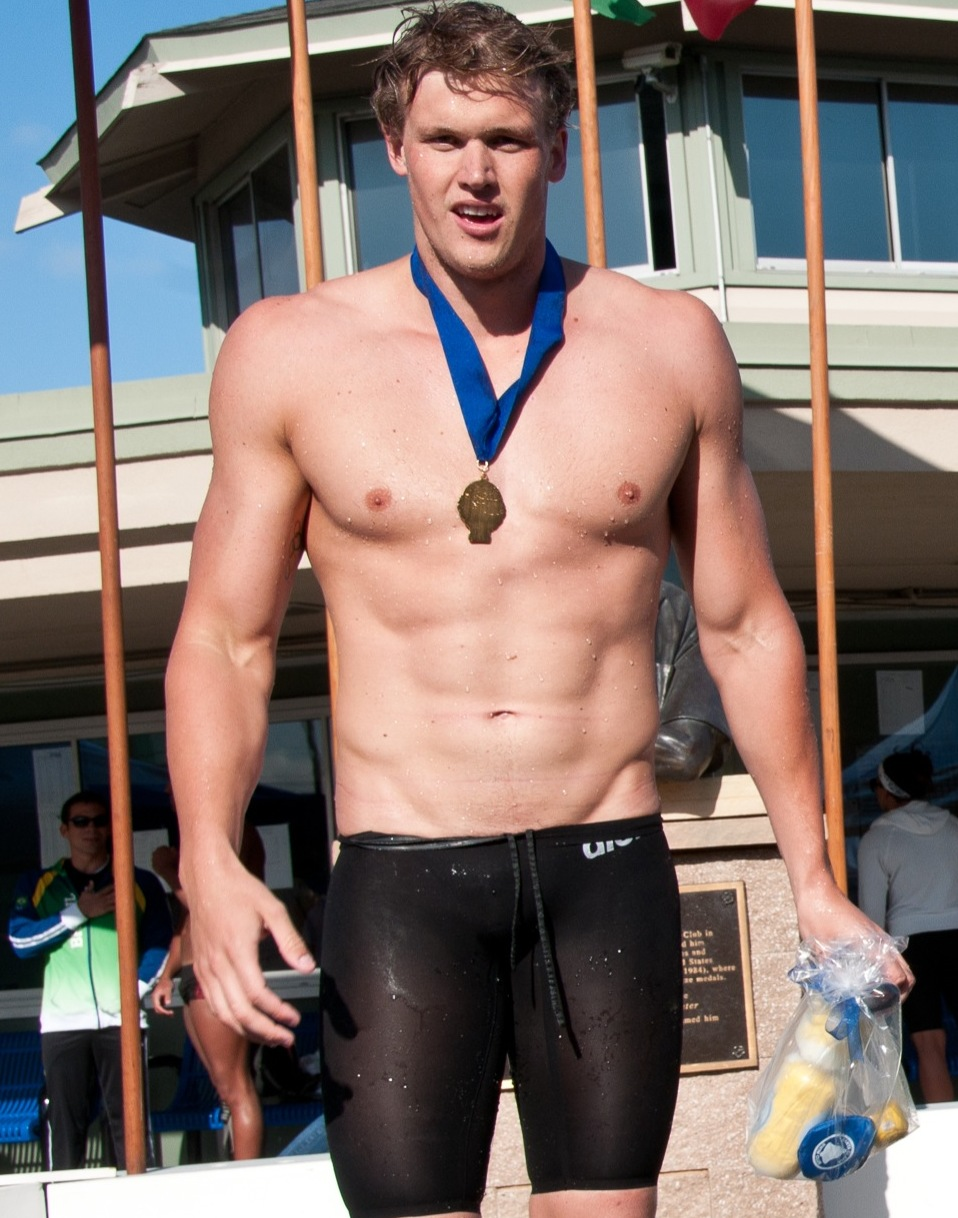
- Monk at 2010 Santa Clara Grand Prix

Personal information
- Full name: Kenrick John Monk
- National team: Australia
- Born: 1 January 1988 (age 38) Blacktown, New South Wales
- Height: 1.96 m (6 ft 5 in)
- Weight: 95 kg (209 lb)

Sport
- Sport: Swimming
- Strokes: Freestyle
- Club: SOPAC
Medal record
Men's swimming
Representing Australia
World Championships (LC)
Gold medal – first place	2007 Melbourne	4×100 m medley
Silver medal – second place	2007 Melbourne	4×200 m freestyle
Bronze medal – third place	2009 Rome	4×200 m freestyle
World Championships (SC)
Gold medal – first place	2008 Manchester	200 m freestyle
Gold medal – first place	2008 Manchester	4×200 m freestyle
Pan Pacific Championships
Bronze medal – third place	2006 Victoria	4×100 m freestyle
Bronze medal – third place	2006 Victoria	4×200 m freestyle
Bronze medal – third place	2010 Irvine	4×200 m freestyle
Commonwealth Games
Gold medal – first place	2006 Melbourne	4×100 m medley
Gold medal – first place	2010 Delhi	4×200 m freestyle
Silver medal – second place	2010 Delhi	200 m freestyle
Bronze medal – third place	2006 Melbourne	4×200 m freestyle

Kenrick John Monk (born 1 January 1988) is an Australian swimmer who competed in the 2008 Summer Olympics in Beijing, the 2012 Summer Olympics in London, as well as at an international level through the FINA World Aquatics Championships, Pan Pacific Swimming Championships, and the Commonwealth Games. Outside of the pool, Monk gained attention in 2011 after he falsely claimed to have been involved in a deliberate hit-and-run accident.

== Early life ==
Born in 1988 in Blacktown, New South Wales, Monk attended Quakers Hill High School. He started swimming at the age of four while in Blacktown, and at 14 he started training with coach Tony Shaw, who also trained Grant Brits.

== Swimming career ==
Monk competed in his first Commonwealth Games in 2006, after being asked to fill in for Ian Thorpe. He finished seventh in the 100m freestyle event, and ninth in the 200m. As a member of the Australian men's relay team, he won gold in the 4×100-metre medley (as a heat swimmer) and bronze in the 4×200-metre freestyle. Later that year he competed in the 2006 Pan Pacific Swimming Championships, finishing sixth in the 200-metre freestyle, and taking the bronze medal in the men's 4×100-metre and 4×200-metre freestyle relay events.

Monk came fourth in the 200-metre freestyle at his first World Aquatics Championship in 2007, an achievement that he regarded as one of his best. He was part of the Australian team that won a silver medal in the corresponding relay event.

In 2008, Monk won two gold medals at the FINA Short Course World Championships in the 200m freestyle individual competition and the men's 4×200-metre freestyle relay. This led to the 2008 Beijing Olympics, although there he was less successful, finishing 22nd in the 200-metre freestyle event.

After the disappointment of the Beijing Olympics, Monk announced that he was moving to Brisbane to train with Olympic gold medallist and world record holder Stephanie Rice under coach Michael Bohl. Subsequently he finished third in the 4×200-metre freestyle relay at the 2009 World Aquatics Championship and fifth in the individual 200-metre freestyle. His second Commonwealth Games was the following year, in 2010, where Monk won silver in the individual 200 m freestyle and gold in the 4×200-metre freestyle relay.

In 2012, in the 200-metre freestyle, Monk finished 2nd behind Thomas Fraser-Holmes at the Australian trials in Adelaide and qualified for the London Olympics. In London, he finished 13th in the individual 200-metre freestyle and 5th in the 4×200-metre freestyle relay.

== Accident and police investigation ==
In September 2011, Monk was involved in an accident that put his 2011/2012 season in doubt, in which he fractured his elbow in two places during the leadup to the 2012 Olympic Games. Monk claimed to have been deliberately hit by a car while riding his bike, and a police investigation was launched. However, after a witness emerged who contradicted Monk's statement, it was revealed that he had not been involved in a hit-and-run, but had instead fallen off his skateboard and lied about the cause of the accident. Monk stated that his fabrication was to hide the true cause, as he was "not supposed to be engaging in dangerous or high impact sports".

As a result of making a false statement to police, Monk faced a possible $10,000 fine, three-year jail term and disciplinary action from Swimming Australia. In late November 2011, the Queensland Police Service announced that they would not be pursuing charges, but he was fined by Swimming Australia and received a letter of reprimand from the Queensland police. In response, the president of the Queensland Police Union spoke out against the decision, arguing against Swimming Australia's defence of Monk, and stated that "The public rightly expect that no one should deliberately waste the time of police, whether they be wannabe B-grade celebrity athletes like this modern-day 'boy who cried wolf', Kenrick Monk, or just regular people."

== Facebook picture ==
In June 2012, Kenrick Monk and Nick D'Arcy published a picture on Facebook where they were holding automatic pistols and pump-action shotguns, drawing extended criticism. After review by Swimming Australia, they were allowed to participate in the London Olympics but were asked to leave the Olympic village as soon as their swimming competition was over.

== See also ==
- List of Commonwealth Games medallists in swimming (men)
- World record progression 4 × 200 metres freestyle relay
