= Leith Brodie =

Australian swimmer (born 1986)

Personal information
- Full name: Leith Brodie
- National team: Australia
- Born: 16 July 1986 (age 39) Kempsey, New South Wales
- Height: 1.87 m (6 ft 2 in)
- Weight: 84 kg (185 lb)

Sport
- Sport: Swimming
- Strokes: Freestyle, medley
- Club: Albany Creek Swim Club
Medal record
Men's swimming
Representing Australia
Olympic Games
Bronze medal – third place	2008 Beijing	4×100 m freestyle
Bronze medal – third place	2008 Beijing	4×200 m freestyle
World Championships (LC)
Bronze medal – third place	2005 Montreal	4×100 m freestyle
Pan Pacific Championships
Bronze medal – third place	2006 Victoria	4×100 m freestyle
Bronze medal – third place	2006 Victoria	4×200 m freestyle
Bronze medal – third place	2010 Irvine	4×200 m freestyle
Commonwealth Games
Gold medal – first place	2010 Delhi	4×200 m freestyle
Bronze medal – third place	2010 Delhi	200 m medley

Leith Brodie (born 16 July 1986) is an Australian sprint freestyle and medley swimmer who is an Olympic bronze medalist and was trained by John Robinson at the Albany Creek Swim Club. At the 2008 Summer Olympics in Beijing, Brodie won a pair of bronze medals as a member of the Australian teams in the men's 4×100-metre freestyle relay and the 4x200-metre freestyle relay. He also swam in the 200 metres individual medley.

He attended St Joseph's College, Nudgee.

== See also ==
- List of Commonwealth Games medallists in swimming (men)
- List of Olympic medalists in swimming (men)
