= David Carry =

Scottish swimmer (born 1981)

Personal information
- Full name: David Robert Carry
- National team: Great Britain
- Born: 8 October 1981 (age 44) Aberdeen, Scotland
- Height: 1.85 m (6 ft 1 in)
- Weight: 77 kg (170 lb)

Sport
- Sport: Swimming
- Strokes: Freestyle, medley
- Club: Aberdeen Dolphins; City of Aberdeen
- College team: Loughborough University
Medal record
Men's swimming
Representing Great Britain
World Championships (SC)
Silver medal – second place	2008 Manchester	4×200 m freestyle
European Championships (LC)
Silver medal – second place	2006 Budapest	4×200 m freestyle
Representing Scotland
Commonwealth Games
Gold medal – first place	2006 Melbourne	400 m freestyle
Gold medal – first place	2006 Melbourne	400 m medley
Silver medal – second place	2006 Melbourne	4×200 m freestyle
Silver medal – second place	2010 Delhi	4×200 m freestyle
Bronze medal – third place	2010 Delhi	400 m freestyle

David Robert Carry (born 8 October 1981) is a Scottish former competition swimmer who represented Great Britain in the Olympics, FINA world championships and the European championships, and Scotland in the Commonwealth Games. He competed internationally in freestyle and medley swimming events. He is the winner of seven medals in major international championships. He is of Scottish-Faroese ancestry.

He represented Scotland at the 2002, 2006 and 2010 Commonwealth Games. In 2006 he won two golds in the 400-metre freestyle and 400-metre individual medley.

He attended Robert Gordon's College during his school years. He represented Great Britain at the 2008 Summer Olympics in Beijing, competing the 400-metre freestyle and 4×200-metre freestyle relay swimming events. Four years later at the 2012 Summer Olympics in London, he swam in the 400-metre freestyle, and qualified for the finals with the time 3:47.25. His final result was seventh, with the time 3:48.62. He was also a member of the British men's team in the 4×200-metre freestyle relay.

Carry retired from competitive swimming in October 2012. Following his retirement from swimming, he was performance director for his former sports management company, Red Sky Management, based in Edinburgh, as a business coach.

Carry along with heptathlete Jessica Ennis-Hill, boxer Nicola Adams, fellow swimmer Michael Jamieson and sprinter Allan Wells were ambassadors for Glasgow 2014 Commonwealth Games.

On 15 September 2012 at Craigiebuckler Church, Aberdeen, where generations of the Carry family have married, David and fellow swimmer Keri-Anne Payne were married. The couple had lived in Heywood, Greater Manchester. However, due to Carry's retirement from competitive swimming and in preparation for the 2014 Commonwealth Games in Glasgow, after their wedding they relocated to Edinburgh, where Payne joined Warrender Baths Club.

== Personal bests and records ==
Event	Long course	Short course
100 m freestyle	50.64	49.66
200 m freestyle	1:46.47 ^{NR}	1:45.63
400 m freestyle	3:47.17 ^{NR}	3:40.51
400 m individual medley	4:15.98	4:13.83
Key NR:British

== See also ==
- Commonwealth Games records in swimming
- List of Commonwealth Games medallists in swimming (men)
