= 2006 Pan Pacific Swimming Championships =

International swimming competition

- Host city: Victoria, British Columbia, Canada
- Date: August 17–20, 2006
- Venue(s): Saanich Commonwealth Place and Elk Lake
- Events: 36

The tenth edition of the Pan Pacific Swimming Championships, a long course (50 m) event, was held in 2006 in Victoria, British Columbia, Canada, from August 17–20. Six world records were tallied compared to one from the 2002 edition. This edition was slower than it would have been because of the lack of a full strength Australian team, one of the strongest teams in the world. This made it a common situation that swimmers in the B final were swimming fast enough to place in the top 3 since no country is allowed to have more than 2 swimmers in either final heat.

== Results ==
=== Men's events ===
Event	Gold		Silver		Bronze	
50 m freestyle	Cullen Jones (USA)	21.84 CR	Roland Schoeman (RSA)	22.12	Brent Hayden (CAN)	22.22
100 m freestyle	Brent Hayden (CAN)	48.59 CR	Jason Lezak (USA)	48.76	Eamon Sullivan (AUS); Roland Schoeman (RSA)	49.09
200 m freestyle	Klete Keller (USA)	1:46.20	Park Tae-Hwan (KOR)	1:47.51	Zhang Lin (CHN)	1:47.59
400 m freestyle	Park Tae-Hwan (KOR)	3:45.72	Zhang Lin (CHN)	3:47.07	Klete Keller (USA)	3:47.17
800 m freestyle	Andrew Hurd (CAN)	7:55.88	Troyden Prinsloo (RSA)	7:56.82	Ryan Cochrane (CAN)	7:58.32
1500 m freestyle	Park Tae-Hwan (KOR)	15:06.11	Erik Vendt (USA)	15:07.17	Takeshi Matsuda (JPN)	15:08.97
100 m backstroke	Aaron Peirsol (USA)	53.32 CR	Ryan Lochte (USA)	54.02	Tomomi Morita (JPN)	54.38
200 m backstroke	Aaron Peirsol (USA)	1:54.44 WR	Michael Phelps (USA)	1:56.81	Tomomi Morita (JPN)	1:58.53
100 m breaststroke	Brendan Hansen (USA)	59.90 CR	Brenton Rickard (AUS)	1:00.39	Kosuke Kitajima (JPN)	1:00.90
200 m breaststroke	Brendan Hansen (USA)	2:08.50 WR	Kosuke Kitajima (JPN)	2:10.87	Scott Usher (USA)	2:11.49
100 m butterfly	Ian Crocker (USA)	51.47 CR	Ryo Takayasu (JPN)	52.59	Takashi Yamamoto (JPN)	52.71
200 m butterfly	Michael Phelps (USA)	1:53.80 WR	Ryuichi Shibata (JPN)	1:55.82	Takeshi Matsuda (JPN)	1:56.20
200 m individual medley	Michael Phelps (USA)	1:55.84 WR	Ryan Lochte (USA)	1:56.11	Ken Takakuwa (JPN)	1:59.81
400 m individual medley	Michael Phelps (USA)	4:10.47 CR	Robert Margalis (USA)	4:13.85	Thiago Pereira (BRA)	4:18.44
4×100 m freestyle relay	United States; Michael Phelps (48.83); Neil Walker (47.89); Cullen Jones (47.96); Jason Lezak (47.78)	3:12.46 WR	Australia; Eamon Sullivan (49.30); Andrew Mewing (49.22); Leith Brodie (49.16); Kenrick Monk (48.74)	3:14.60	Canada; Rick Say (49.79); Brent Hayden (48.07); Colin Russell (49.09); Matt Rose (49.17)	3:16.12
4×200 m freestyle relay	United States; Michael Phelps (1:45.91); Ryan Lochte (1:47.34); Peter Vanderkaay (1:46.49); Klete Keller (1:45.54)	7:05.28 CR, AM	Canada; Brian Johns (1:48.91); Andrew Hurd (1:47.61); Brent Hayden (1:47.36); Colin Russell (1:48.51)	7:12.39	Australia; Leith Brodie (1:50.82); Andrew Mewing (1:48.66); Nicholas Ffrost (1:48.93); Kenrick Monk (1:48.80)	7:17.21
4×100 m medley relay	United States; Aaron Peirsol (53.74); Brendan Hansen (59.18); Ian Crocker (50.92); Jason Lezak (47.95)	3:31.79 CR	Japan; Tomomi Morita (54.41); Kosuke Kitajima (59.79); Ryo Takayasu (52.27); Takamitsu Kojima (49.23)	3:35.70	Australia; Matt Welsh (54.98); Brenton Rickard (1:00.03); Andrew Lauterstein (52.62); Eamon Sullivan (48.52)	3:36.15
10 km open water	Chip Peterson (USA)	1:54:26.68	Fran Crippen (USA)	1:54:50.46	Travis Nederpelt (AUS)	1:55.16.89

=== Women's events ===
Event	Gold		Silver		Bronze	
50 m freestyle	Kara Lynn Joyce (USA)	25.10	Natalie Coughlin (USA)	25.32	Flavia Delaroli (BRA)	25.62
100 m freestyle	Natalie Coughlin (USA)	53.87	Amanda Weir (USA)	53.92	Melanie Schlanger (AUS)	55.00
200 m freestyle	Katie Hoff (USA)	1:58.02	Linda Mackenzie (AUS)	1:58.26	Bronte Barratt (AUS)	1:58.59
400 m freestyle	Ai Shibata (JPN)	4:07.61	Katie Hoff (USA)	4:07.98	Sachiko Yamada (JPN)	4:08.42
800 m freestyle	Kate Ziegler (USA)	8:24.56	Ai Shibata (JPN)	8:26.41	Hayley Peirsol (USA)	8:27.57
1500 m freestyle	Kate Ziegler (USA)	15:55.01 CR	Hayley Peirsol (USA)	15:57.36	Ai Shibata (JPN)	16:11.13
100 m backstroke	Hanae Ito (JPN)	1:00.63	Natalie Coughlin (USA)	1:00.66	Reiko Nakamura (JPN)	1:00.86
200 m backstroke	Reiko Nakamura (JPN)	2:08.86 CR	Margaret Hoelzer (USA)	2:09.42	Takami Igarashi (JPN)	2:10.30
100 m breaststroke	Tara Kirk (USA)	1:07.56	Megan Jendrick (USA)	1:07.58	Sarah Katsoulis (AUS)	1:08.12
200 m breaststroke	Suzaan van Biljon (RSA)	2:26.36	Asami Kitagawa (JPN)	2:27.07	Jung Seul-Ki (KOR)	2:27.09
100 m butterfly	Jessicah Schipper (AUS)	57.30 CR	Rachel Komisarz (USA)	58.75	Mary DeScenza (USA)	59.03
200 m butterfly	Jessicah Schipper (AUS)	2:05.40 WR	Yuko Nakanishi (JPN)	2:06.52	Yurie Yano (JPN)	2:07.86
200 m individual medley	Whitney Myers (USA)	2:10.11 CR	Katie Hoff (USA)	2:11.51	Stephanie Rice (AUS)	2:13.21
400 m individual medley	Katie Hoff (USA)	4:36.82 CR	Ariana Kukors (USA)	4:39.68	Stephanie Rice (AUS)	4:41.83
4×100 m freestyle relay	United States; Amanda Weir (53.76); Natalie Coughlin (53.21); Kara Lynn Joyce (54.54); Lacey Nymeyer (54.29)	3:35.80 CR	Canada; Victoria Poon (56.54); Geneviève Saumur (55.38); Julia Wilkinson (55.37); Erica Morningstar (54.54)	3:41.83	Australia; Shayne Reese (55.58); Kelly Stubbins (55.92); Linda Mackenzie (55.62); Melanie Schlanger (54.72)	3:41.84
4×200 m freestyle relay	United States; Natalie Coughlin (1:58.37); Lacey Nymeyer (2:00.06); Dana Vollmer (1:58.87); Katie Hoff (1:57.32)	7:54.62 CR	Australia; Bronte Barratt (1:59.58); Shayne Reese (1:59.46); Kelly Stubbins (2:00.08); Linda Mackenzie (1:58.88)	7:58.00	Japan; Maki Mita (1:59.61); Norie Urabe (1:59.93); Ai Shibata (1:58.83); Haruka Ueda (2:02.28)	8:00.65
4×100 m medley relay	United States; Natalie Coughlin (1:00.12); Jessica Hardy (1:06.53); Rachel Komisarz (57.88); Amanda Weir (53.85)	3:58.38 CR	Japan; Hanae Ito (1:00.63); Asami Kitagawa (1:08.54); Yuko Nakanishi (58.21); Maki Mita (55.09)	4:02.47	Australia; Fran Adcock (1:02.85); Sarah Katsoulis (1:08.53); Jessicah Schipper (57.76); Melanie Schlanger (54.68)	4:03.82
10 km open water	Chloe Sutton (USA)	2:04:25.05	Kalyn Keller (USA)	2:04:29.08	Tanya Hunks (CAN)	2:05:01.03

== Medal table ==
Rank	Nation	Gold	Silver	Bronze	Total
1	United States (USA)	26	18	4	48
2	Japan (JPN)	3	8	13	24
3	Australia (AUS)	2	3	12	17
4	Canada (CAN)	2	3	3	8
5	South Korea (KOR)	2	1	1	4
6	South Africa (RSA)	1	2	1	4
7	China (CHN)	0	1	1	2
8	Brazil (BRA)	0	0	2	2
Totals (8 entries)		36	36	37	109

== New records achieved ==
=== World records ===
Event	Name	Time
Men's 200 m backstroke	Aaron Peirsol (USA)	1:54.44
Men's 200 m breaststroke	Brendan Hansen (USA)	2:08.50
Men's 200 m butterfly	Michael Phelps (USA)	1:53.80
Men's 200 m individual medley	Michael Phelps (USA)	1:55.84
Men's 4×100 m freestyle relay	United States; Michael Phelps; Neil Walker; Cullen Jones; Jason Lezak	3:12.46
Women's 200 m butterfly	Jessicah Schipper (AUS)	2:05.40

=== Championship records ===
Event	Name	Time
Men's 50 m freestyle	Cullen Jones (USA)	21.84
Men's 100 m freestyle	Brent Hayden (CAN)	48.59
Men's 100 m backstroke	Aaron Peirsol (USA)	53.32
Men's 200 m backstroke	Aaron Peirsol (USA)	1:54.44
Men's 100 m breaststroke	Brendan Hansen (USA)	59.90
Men's 200 m breaststroke	Brendan Hansen (USA)	2:08.50
Men's 100 m butterfly	Ian Crocker (USA)	51.47
Men's 200 m butterfly	Michael Phelps (USA)	1:53.80
Men's 200 m individual medley	Michael Phelps (USA)	1:55.84
Men's 400 m individual medley	Michael Phelps (USA)	4:10.47
Men's 4×100 m freestyle relay	United States; Michael Phelps; Neil Walker; Cullen Jones; Jason Lezak	3:12.46
Men's 4×200 m freestyle relay	United States; Michael Phelps; Ryan Lochte; Peter Vanderkaay; Klete Keller	7:05.28
Men's 4×100 m medley relay	United States; Aaron Peirsol; Brendan Hansen; Ian Crocker; Jason Lezak	3:31.79
Women's 100 m freestyle	Amanda Weir (USA)	53.76
Women's 1500 m freestyle	Kate Ziegler (USA)	15:55.01
Women's 200 m backstroke	Reiko Nakamura (JPN)	2:08.86
Women's 100 m breaststroke	Jessica Hardy (USA)	1:06.43
Women's 100 m butterfly	Jessicah Schipper (AUS)	57.30
Women's 200 m butterfly	Jessicah Schipper (AUS)	2:05.40
Women's 200 m individual medley	Whitney Myers (USA)	2:10.11
Women's 400 m individual medley	Katie Hoff (USA)	4:36.82
Women's 4×100 m freestyle relay	United States; Amanda Weir; Natalie Coughlin; Kara Lynn Joyce; Lacey Nymeyer	3:35.80
Women's 4×200 m freestyle relay	United States; Natalie Coughlin; Lacey Nymeyer; Dana Vollmer; Katie Hoff|	7:54.62
Women's 4×100 m medley relay	United States; Natalie Coughlin; Jessica Hardy; Rachel Komisarz; Amanda Weir	3:58.38

== See also ==
- All-time Pan Pacific Championships medal table
