= Saanich Commonwealth Place =

Sports venue in Saanich, British Columbia

Coordinates: 48°30′05.06″N 123°23′22.71″W

Saanich Commonwealth Place is a recreation centre located in Saanich, British Columbia. It opened in 1993 and was used as a venue in the 1994 Commonwealth Games. The facility is owned and operated by the District of Saanich and includes a ~7000 square foot gymnasium, 50-metre competition pool, 25-metre dive tank, 25-metre lap pool, wave pool, weight room, and the Bruce Hutchison Branch of the Greater Victoria Public Library.

Construction of the original facility cost $22 million. The centre regularly undergoes renovations, most recently with the proposed replacement of the pool's waterslide in late 2025. Operating costs in 2018 were $2.3 million.

The facility served as a High Performance Centre for Swimming Canada from its opening until 2020. The high performance program supported a number of successful Canadian swimming athletes, including Ryan Cochrane, Hilary Caldwell and Richard Weinberger.
