= Rodrigo Castro =

Brazilian swimmer (born 1978)

Personal information
- Full name: Rodrigo Octávio Coelho da Rocha e Castro
- Nationality: Brazil
- Born: 21 December 1978 (age 47) Belo Horizonte, Minas Gerais, Brazil
- Height: 1.84 m (6 ft 0 in)
- Weight: 81 kg (179 lb)

Sport
- Sport: Swimming
- Strokes: Freestyle
- Club: Minas Tênis Clube, Belo Horizonte
Medal record
World Championships (SC)
Bronze medal – third place	2004 Indianapolis	4×200 m freestyle
Pan American Games
Gold medal – first place	2007 Rio de Janeiro	4×200 m freestyle
Silver medal – second place	1999 Winnipeg	4×200 m freestyle
Silver medal – second place	2003 S Domingo	4×200 m freestyle
Bronze medal – third place	2003 S Domingo	200 m freestyle

Rodrigo Octávio Coelho da Rocha e Castro (born 21 December 1978 in Belo Horizonte, Minas Gerais) is a freestyle swimmer from Brazil, who competed for his native country at three consecutive Summer Olympics, starting in 2000 (Sydney).

== International career ==
=== 1999 ===
He was at the 1999 Pan American Games in Winnipeg, where he earned a silver medal in the 4×200-metre freestyle. The time of the Brazilian relay team (7:22.92), also including Gustavo Borges, André Cordeiro and Leonardo Costa, was a South American record.

=== 2000 Summer Olympics ===
He participated in 2000 Summer Olympics in Sydney, where he placed 13th in the 4×200-metre freestyle, and 33rd in the 200-metre freestyle.

=== 2000-2004 ===
At the 2002 FINA World Swimming Championships (25 m), in Moscow, he finished 10th in the 200-metre freestyle and 4th in the 4×200-metre freestyle final.

Participating in the 2003 World Aquatics Championships, Castro was 18th in the 200-metre freestyle and 9th in the 4×200-metre freestyle.

At the 2003 Pan American Games in Santo Domingo, Castro won the bronze medal in the 200-metre freestyle and silver in the 4×200-metre freestyle, along with Carlos Jayme, Rafael Mosca and Gustavo Borges.

=== 2004 Summer Olympics ===
Castro was at the 2004 Summer Olympics in Athens, where he finished 9th in the 4×200-metre freestyle, 20th in the 200-metre freestyle, and 12th in the 4×100-metre freestyle.

=== 2004-2008 ===
At the 2004 FINA World Swimming Championships (25 m) in Indianapolis, he had his best results in Short-Course World Championships. Castro won the bronze medal in the 4×200-metre freestyle, and also was a finalist in the 200-metre freestyle, finishing in 8th place.

Castro was at the 2006 FINA World Swimming Championships (25 m), in Shanghai, where he finished 7th in the 200-metre freestyle final and 5th in the 4×200-metre freestyle final

He swam at the 2006 Pan Pacific Swimming Championships, where he finished 6th in the 4×200-metre freestyle, 14th in the 200-metre freestyle, 23rd in the 100-metre freestyle, and was disqualified at the 4×100-metre freestyle.

Participating in the 2007 World Aquatics Championships, in Melbourne, finished 36th in the 200-metre freestyle and 11th in the 4×200-metre freestyle

At the 2007 Pan American Games, in Rio de Janeiro, Rodrigo Castro won the gold medal in the 4×200-metre freestyle and finished 5th in the 200-metre freestyle.

Participating in the 2008 FINA World Swimming Championships (25 m) in Manchester, Castro finished 6th place in the 200-metre freestyle final.

=== 2008 Summer Olympics ===
At the 2008 Summer Olympics, participated in his third Olympics. He was in 16th place in the 200-metre freestyle and 4×200-metre freestyle. He was also in the 4×100-metre freestyle, where the Brazilian team was disqualified. Broke the Gustavo Borges' South American Record in the 200-metre freestyle in olympic pool, which had lasted 10 years, with a time of 1:47.87. After this, thought about end of his career, but officially went swimming.

=== 2008-2012 ===
Participated in the 2009 World Aquatics Championships in Rome, where he finished 30th place in the 200-metre freestyle and 10th in the 4×200-metre freestyle

At the 2010 Pan Pacific Swimming Championships in Irvine, he finished 24th in the 200-metre freestyle, 41st in the 100-metre freestyle and 44th in the 50-metre freestyle.

He was at the 2010 FINA World Swimming Championships (25 m) in Dubai, where he finished 23rd in the 200-metre freestyle and 8th in the 4×200-metre freestyle.

At the 2011 World Aquatics Championships in Shanghai, he finished 14th in the 4×200-metre freestyle.

== Retirement ==
In late 2012, Castro, age 33, announced his retirement from swimming.

== See also ==
- Pan American Games records in swimming
- South American records in swimming
