= Colin Russell (swimmer) =

Canadian swimmer

Personal information
- Full name: Colin Russell
- National team: Canada
- Born: July 2, 1984 (age 42) Oshawa, Ontario
- Height: 1.93 m (6 ft 4 in)
- Weight: 85 kg (187 lb)

Sport
- Sport: Swimming
- Strokes: Freestyle
- Club: Dolphins Swim Club
- College team: University of Toronto
Medal record
Men's swimming
Representing Canada
World Championships (LC)
Silver medal – second place	2005 Montreal	4x200 m freestyle
Pan Pacific Championships
Silver medal – second place	2006 Victoria	4x200 m freestyle
Commonwealth Games
Bronze medal – third place	2006 Melbourne	4x100 m freestyle

Colin Russell (born July 2, 1984) is a Canadian competitive swimmer and freestyle specialist. Russell won a silver medal in the 4x200-metre freestyle relay at the 2005 World Aquatics Championships. At the 2008 Summer Olympics in Beijing, he competed in the 200 metre freestyle (finishing fourteenth), 4x100-metre freestyle relay (finishing sixth), and 4x200-metre freestyle relay (finishing fifth). At the 2012 Summer Olympics, he competed in the 4 x 100 and the 4 x 200 metre relays.

Russell was an MSc student in kinesiology at Brock University. His sister Sinead has also represented Canada in Olympic swimming.

== See also ==
- World record progression 4 × 200 metres freestyle relay
