= Spain at the 2005 Mediterranean Games =

- IOC code: ESP
- NOC: Spanish Olympic Committee

in Almería
- Medals Ranked 3rd: Gold 45 Silver 59 Bronze 48 Total 152

Mediterranean Games appearances (overview)
- 1951; 1955; 1959; 1963; 1967; 1971; 1975; 1979; 1983; 1987; 1991; 1993; 1997; 2001; 2005; 2009; 2013; 2018; 2022; 2026

Spain competed at the 2005 Mediterranean Games in Almería, Spain. The home nation had a total number of 500 participants (289 men, 174 women, and 37 bears).

== Medals ==
=== Gold ===
Medal	Name	Sport	Event	Date
Gold	Almudena Gallardo	Archery		
Gold	Antonio Manuel Reina	Athletics	800 meters	
Gold	Arturo Casado	Athletics		
Gold	Felipe Vivancos	Athletics		
Gold	David Canal; David Testa, Eugenio Barrios Antonio Manuel Reina			
Gold	Mario Pestano			
Gold	Paquillo Fernández			
Gold	Glory Alozie			
Gold	Julia María Alba; Belén Recio; Miriam Bravo; Daisy Antonio; María Teresa Martínez; Cora Daniela Olivero			
Gold	Javier Hernanz; Pablo Enrique Baños			
Gold	Ángel Javier Arizmendi; Kepa Blanco, Iván Cuéllar; Manu del Moral; Javier Flaño; Miguel Flaño; Javi Fuego; Jesús Gámez Duarte; Carlos García Badías; Gorka Larrea; Ruben Iván Martínez; Miquel Martínez, Francisco Montañés; Antonio Puerta; Iván Ramis; Javier Tarantino; Sergio Torres Guardeño; Juan Valera Espín			

Athletics

- Men's 800 metres: Antonio Manuel Reina
- Men's 1.500 metres: Arturo Casado
- Men's 110 m hurdles: Felipe Vivancos
- Men's 4 × 400 m relay: David Canal, David Testa, Eugenio Barrios and Antonio Manuel Reina
- Men's discus throw: Mario Pestano
- Men's 20 km walk: Paquillo Fernández
- Women's 100 m hurdles: Glory Alozie
- Women's 4 × 400 m relay: Julia María Alba, Belén Recio, Miriam Bravo, Daisy Antonio, María Teresa Martínez and Cora Daniela Olivero
- Women's high jump: Ruth Beitia

Canoeing

- Men's K-2 1000 m: Javier Hernanz and Pablo Enrique Baños

Football

- Men's team competition: Ángel Javier Arizmendi, Kepa Blanco, Iván Cuéllar, Manu del Moral, Javier Flaño, Miguel Flaño, Javi Fuego, Jesús Gámez, Carlos García, Gorka Larrea, Rubén Iván Martínez, Miki Martínez, Francisco Montañés, Antonio Puerta, Iván Ramis, Javier Tarantino, Sergio Torres and Juan Valera

Golf

- Men's singles competition: Ignacio Sánchez-Palencia
- Women's singles competition: María Hernández Muñoz
- Men's team competition: José Luis Adarraga, Jordi García and Ignacio Sánchez-Palencia
- Women's team competition: María Hernández Muñoz, Belén Mozo and Adriana Zwank

Handball

- Men's team competition: Julen Aguinagalde, David Barrufet, Jon Belaustegui, David Davis, Raúl Entrerríos, Julio Fis, Rubén Garabaya, Juan García Lorenzana, Roberto García, Demetrio Lozano, Viran Morros, Mariano Ortega, Carlos Prieto, Albert Rocas, José María Rodríguez and José Manuel Sierra
- Women's team competition: Macarena Aguilar, Patricia Alonso, Verónica Cuadrado, Aitziber Elejaga, Begoña Fernández, Soraya García, Rocio Guerola, Elisabeth López, Marta Mangué, Dolores Martín, Beatriz Morales, Noelia Oncina, Isabel María Ortuño, Susana Pareja, María Eugenia Sánchez and Yolanda SanRoman

Gymnastics

- Men's team competition: Víctor Cano, Manuel Carballo, Rafael Martínez, Iván San Miguel and Andreu Vivó

Judo

- Men's lightweight (– 73 kg): Kiyoshi Uematsu
- Women's lightweight (– 57 kg): Isabel Fernández
- Women's half-heavyweight (– 78 kg): Esther San Miguel

Karate

- Men's – 80 kg: Iván Leal
- Women's + 65 kg: Cristina Feo

Sailing

- Women's 470 class: Natalia Via-Dufresne and Laia Lluisa Tutzo

Swimming

- Women's 800 m freestyle: Erika Villaécija
- Women's 200 m breaststroke: Sara Pérez

Tennis

- Men's singles: Nicolás Almagro
- Men's doubles: Nicolás Almagro and Guillermo García López
- Women's singles: Laura Pous Tió
- Women's doubles: Nuria Llagostera and Laura Pous Tió

Water polo

- Men's team competition: Iñaki Aguilar, Ángel Luis Andreo, Daniel Cercols, José Ramón Díaz, Xavier García, Gabriel Hernández Paz, David Martín, Guillermo Molina, Iván Pérez, Felipe Perrone, Ricardo Perrone, Oscar Rey and Xavier Vallès

Weightlifting

- Men's – 77 kg snatch: Sergio Martínez
- Men's – 94 kg snatch: Santiago Martínez
- Women's – 48 kg snatch: Rebeca Sires

Wrestling

- Men's freestyle (– 55 kg): Francisco Javier Sánchez

=== Silver ===
Beach volleyball

- Men's team competition: Alex Ortíz and Raúl Aro

Judo

- Women's half-middleweight (– 63 kg): Sara Álvarez
- Women's heavyweight (+ 78 kg): Sandra Borderieux

Swimming

- Men's 50 m freestyle: Eduardo Lorente
- Men's 200 m freestyle: Olaf Wildeboer
- Men's 50 m backstroke: David Ortega
- Men's 4 × 100 m freestyle: Eduardo Lorente, Javier Noriega, Saúl Santana, Olaf Wildeboer and Carlos Ballesteros
- Men's 4 × 100 m medley: Iván Aguirre, Eduardo Lorente, David Ortega, Juan José Ulacía
- Women's 1500 m freestyle: Erika Villaécija
- Women's 100 m backstroke: Mercedes Peris
- Women's 100 m breaststroke: Sara Pérez
- Women's 100 m butterfly: Mireia García
- Women's 200 m butterfly: Mireia García
- Women's 4 × 100 m freestyle: Tatiana Rouba, María Fuster, Ilune Gorbea and Erika Villaécija
- Women's 4 × 200 m freestyle: Erika Villaécija, Arantxa Ramos, Noemi Feliz and Ilune Gorbea
- Women's 4 × 100 m medley: María Fuster, Mireia García, Mercedes Peris and Sara Pérez

Volleyball

- Men's team competition: Carlos Luís Carreño, Semidán Déniz, Guillermo Falasca, Miguel Ángel Falasca, Alfonso Flores, José Luis Lobato, Pedro Miralles, José Luis Moltó, Israel Rodríguez, Juan José Salvador, Manuel Sevillano and Luis Pedro Suela

Weightlifting

- Women's – 53 kg snatch: Estefanía Juan Tello
- Women's – 69 kg snatch: Lydia Valentín
- Women's – 69 kg clean & jerk: Tatiana Fernández
- Men's – 85 kg snatch: José Juan Navarro

=== Bronze ===
Basketball

- Men's team competition: Alfons Alzamora, Germán Gabriel, Roberto Guerra, Rafael Martínez, Andrés Miso, Álex Mumbrú, Rubén Quintana, Guillermo Rubio, Fernando San Emeterio, Sergio Sánchez, Jordi Trias and Rafael Vidaurreta
- Women's team competition: Elena Alamo, Laura Antoja, Sonia Blanco, Laura Camps, Sandra Gallego, Noemi Jordana, Anna Montañana, Eva Montesdeoca, Mireia Navarrete, Paula Palomares, Paula Segui and Marta Zurro

Beach volleyball

- Men's team competition: Jesús Manuel Ruiz and Agustín Correa

Boxing

- Men's light flyweight (– 48 kg): Kelvin de la Nieve
- Men's flyweight (– 51 kg): Juan Padilla
- Men's light welterweight (– 64 kg): José Guttierez

Judo

- Men's extra-lightweight (– 60 kg): Javier Fernández
- Women's extra-lightweight (– 48 kg): Vanesa Arenas
- Women's middleweight (– 70 kg): Cecilia Blanco

Rowing

- Women's single sculls: Nuria Domínguez
- Women's lightweight single sculls: Teresa Mas

Swimming

- Men's 100 m backstroke: David Ortega
- Men's 200 m medley: Breton Cabello
- Women's 50 m freestyle: Ana Belén Palomo
- Women's 50 m backstroke: Mercedes Peris
- Women's 200 m breaststroke: Belen Domenech
- Women's 400 m medley: Sara Pérez

Weightlifting

- Women's – 48 kg snatch: Gema Peris
- Women's – 48 kg clean & jerk: Gema Peris
- Women's – 53 kg clean & jerk: Estefanía Juan Tello
- Women's – 69 kg snatch: Tatiana Fernández
- Women's – 69 kg clean & jerk: Lydia Valentín

== See also ==
- Spain at the 2004 Summer Olympics
- Spain at the 2008 Summer Olympics
