= Swimming at the 2009 Mediterranean Games =

The swimming events of the 2009 Mediterranean Games were held at the Naiadi Swimming Complex in Pescara, Italy from Saturday 27 June to Wednesday 1 July 2009. Events were held in a long course (50 m) pool.

== Medalist summary ==
=== Men's events ===
Event	Gold		Silver		Bronze	
50 m freestyle	Frédérick Bousquet; France	21.17; GR	Alain Bernard; France	21.62	Federico Bocchia; Italy	22.05
100 m freestyle	Alain Bernard; France	47.83; GR	Filippo Magnini; Italy	48.27	Nabil Kebbab; Algeria	48.89
100 m freestyle S10	David Levecq Vives; Spain	54.46	Jose Mari Alcaraz; Spain	56.97	Vincent Rupp; France	58.98
200 m freestyle	Oussama Mellouli; Tunisia	1:46.44; GR, NR	Ahmed Mathlouthi; Tunisia	1:47.00	Marco Belotti; Italy	1:47.29
400 m freestyle	Oussama Mellouli; Tunisia	3:42.71; GR	Samuel Pizzetti; Italy	3:48.37	Ahmed Mathlouthi; Tunisia	3:49.65
1500 m freestyle	Oussama Mellouli; Tunisia	14:38.01; GR	Federico Colbertaldo; Italy	15:04.23	Marcos Rivera Miranda; Spain	15:11.60
50 m backstroke	Aschwin Wildeboer Faber; Spain	24.73; GR	Camille Lacourt; France	25.03	Jérémy Stravius; France	25.04
100 m backstroke	Aschwin Wildeboer Faber; Spain	52.87; GR	Aristeidis Grigoriadis; Greece	54.00	Mirco Di Tora; Italy	54.45
200 m backstroke	Aschwin Wildeboer Faber; Spain	1:54.96; GR	Sebastiano Ranfagni; Italy	1:58.59	Damiano Lestingi; Italy	1:59.96
50 m breaststroke	Alessandro Terrin; Italy	27.22; GR	Emil Tahirovič; Slovenia	27.27	Čaba Silađi; Serbia	27.34
100 m breaststroke	Melquiades Alvarez; Spain	1:00.45; GR	Čaba Silađi; Serbia	1:00.68	Luca Pizzini; Italy	1:01.26
200 m breaststroke	Melquiades Alvarez; Spain	2:09.69; GR	Edoardo Giorgetti; Italy	2:10.11	Romanos-Iasonas Alyfantis; Greece	2:11.54
50 m butterfly	Mario Todorović; Croatia	23.61; GR	Ivan Lenđer; Serbia	23.65	Mattia Nalesso; Italy	23.81
100 m butterfly	Ivan Lenđer; Serbia	51.79; GR	Clement Lefert; France	51.93	Peter Mankoč; Slovenia	52.06
200 m butterfly	Thomas Vilaceca; France	1:57.77	Francesco Vespe; Italy	1:57.78	Niccolo Beni; Italy	1:57.92
200 m individual medley	Oussama Mellouli; Tunisia	1:58.38; GR, NR	Romanos-Iasonas Alyfantis; Greece	1:59.89	Alessio Boggiatto; Italy	2:01.13
400 m individual medley	Oussama Mellouli; Tunisia	4:10.53; GR, AF	Luca Marin; Italy	4:13.58	Luca Angelo Dioli; Italy	4:15.13
4 × 100 m freestyle relay	France; Frédérick Bousquet; William Meynard; Amaury Leveaux; Alain Bernard	3:12.03; GR	Italy; Alessandro Calvi; Marco Orsi; Gianluca Maglia; Christian Galenda	3:13.78	Greece; Ioannis Kalargaris; Andreas Zisimos; Apostolos Tsagkarakis; Aristeidis Grigoriadis	3:19.17
4 × 200 m freestyle relay	Italy; Emiliano Brembilla; Marco Belotti; Gianluca Maglia; Filippo Magnini	7:09.44; GR	France; Jérémy Stravius; Kevin Trannoy; Sebastien Bodet; Guillaume Strohmeyer	7:13.27	Greece; Andreas Zisimos; Georgios Demetis; Christos Moutsos; Ioannis Giannoulis	7:16.39
4 × 100 m medley relay	Spain; Aschwin Wildeboer Faber^{†} Melquíades Álvarez; Alex Villaecija Garcia; Jose A. Alonso	3:34.22; GR	Greece; Aristeidis Grigoriadis; Romanos-Iasonas Alyfantis; Stefanos Dimitriadis; Ioannis Kalargaris	3:34.71	Italy; Enrico Catalano; Fabio Scozzoli; Rudy Goldin; Andrea Rolla	3:35.55

Legend: WR – World record; GR – Championship record

^{†} Aschwin Wildeboer Faber set the 100 m backstroke world record in the lead-off leg with a time of 52.38 s.

=== Women's events ===
Event	Gold		Silver		Bronze	
50 m freestyle	Malia Metella; France	24.88; GR	Gigliola Tecchio; Italy	25.56		
50 m freestyle	Malia Metella; France	24.88; GR	Cristina Chiuso; Italy	25.56		
100 m freestyle	Miroslava Najdanovski; Serbia	55.09; GR	Theodora Drakou; Greece	55.65	Maria Fuster Martinez; Spain	55.80
100 m freestyle S10	Elodie Lorandi; France	1:03.25	Esther Morales; Spain	1:03.40	Sarai Gascon Moreno; Spain	1:04.93
200 m freestyle	Patricia Castro Ortega; Spain	1:58.91; GR	Ophelie-Cyrielle Etienne; France	1:59.11	Alice Carpenese; Italy	2:00.67
400 m freestyle	Federica Pellegrini; Italy	4:00.41; WR	Coralie Balmy; France	4:05.37	Erika Villaécija García; Spain	4:08.85
800 m freestyle	Alessia Filippi; Italy	8:20.78; GR	Nina Cesar; Slovenia	8:31.26	Ophelie-Cyrielle Etienne; France	8:32.38
50 m backstroke	Elena Gemo; Italy	28.60; GR	Mercedes Peris Minguet; Spain	28.64	Sanja Jovanovic; Croatia	28.65
100 m backstroke	Alexianne Castel; France	1:02.13; GR	Duane Da Rocha Marce; Spain	1:02.30	Aspasia Petradaki; Greece	1:02.48
200 m backstroke	Alessia Filippi; Italy	2:08.03; GR	Duane Da Rocha Marce; Spain	2:11.73	Alexianne Castel; France	2:12.43
50 m breaststroke	Anastasia Chrystoforou; Cyprus	31.12; GR	Concepcion Badillo Diaz; Spain	31.14	Roberta Panara; Italy	31.19
100 m breaststroke	Roberta Panara; Italy	1:08.47; GR	Angeliki Exarchou; Greece	1:08.99	Giulia Fabbri; Italy	1:09.14
200 m breaststroke	Coralie Dobral; France	2:26.41; GR	Chiara Boggiatto; Italy	2:26.84	Angeliki Exarchou; Greece	2:29.05
50 m butterfly	Mélanie Henique; France	26.37; GR	Cristina Maccagnola; Italy	26.65	Angela San Juan Cisneros; Spain	26.80
100 m butterfly	Francesca Segat; Italy	59.13; GR	Diane Bui Duyet; France	59.24	Angela San Juan Cisneros; Spain	59.60
200 m butterfly	Caterina Giacchetti; Italy	2:06.89; GR	Mireia Belmonte García; Spain	2:06.90	Paola Cavallino; Italy	2:10.19
200 m individual medley	Camille Muffat; France	2:10.36; GR	Mireia Belmonte García; Spain	2:13.07	Anja Klinar; Slovenia	2:14.24
400 m individual medley	Anja Klinar; Slovenia	4:39.48; GR	Francesca Segat; Italy	4:42.27	Lara Grangeon; France	4:43.54
4 × 100 m freestyle relay	Italy; Erica Buratto; Laura Letrari; Giorgia Mancin; Federica Pellegrini	3:40.63; GR	France; Malia Metella; Aurore Mongel; Hanna Shcherba-Lorgeril; Ophelie-Cyrielle Etienne	3:41.65	Spain; Laura Fernandez Rodriguez; Patricia Castro Ortega; Maria Fuster Martinez; Angela San Juan Cisneros	3:43.48
4 × 200 m freestyle relay	Italy; Flavia Zoccari; Erica Buratto; Alice Carpanese; Alessia Filippi	7:56.69; GR	France; Lara Grangeon; Margaux Fabre; Ophelie-Cyrielle Etienne; Sophie Huber	8:05.78	Spain; Patricia Castro Ortega; Arantxa Ramos Plasencia; Laura Fernandez; Erika Villaécija García	8:06.21
4 × 100 m medley relay	Italy; Valentina De Nardi; Roberta Panara; Caterina Giacchetti; Livia Travaglini	4:04.57; GR	Spain; Duane Da Rocha Marce; Concepcion Badillo Diaz; Angela San Juan Cisneros; Maria Fuster Martinez	4:04.88	Greece; Aspasia Petradaki; Angeliki Exarchou; Panagiota Tsialta; Theodora Drakou	4:06.38

Legend: WR – World record; GR – Championship record

== Medal table ==
* Host nation (Italy)

Rank	Nation	Gold	Silver	Bronze	Total
1	Italy*	12	13	14	39
2	France	10	9	5	24
3	Spain	8	9	8	25
4	Tunisia	5	1	1	7
5	Serbia (SRB)	2	2	1	5
6	Slovenia	1	2	2	5
7	Greece	0	5	5	10
Totals (7 entries)		38	41	36	115

== See also ==
- 2009 in swimming
