= Italy at the 2005 Mediterranean Games =

- IOC code: ITA
- NOC: Italian National Olympic Committee

in Almería
- Medals Ranked 1st: Gold 57 Silver 40 Bronze 56 Total 153

Mediterranean Games appearances (overview)
- 1951; 1955; 1959; 1963; 1967; 1971; 1975; 1979; 1983; 1987; 1991; 1993; 1997; 2001; 2005; 2009; 2013; 2018; 2022; 2026

Italy (ITA) competed at the 2005 Mediterranean Games in Almería, Spain.

== Medals ==
=== Athletics ===
Sport	Gold	Silver	Bronze	Total
Athletics	7	8	7	22
Totals (1 entries)	7	8	7	22

==== Men ====
Event	1st place, gold medalist(s)	2nd place, silver medalist(s)	3rd place, bronze medalist(s)
400 metres hurdles	Gianni Carabelli	Laurent Ottoz	
4×100 metres relay	Luca Verdecchia; Alessandro Attene; Massimiliano Donati; Marco Torrieri		
200 metres		Alessandro Attene	
110 metres hurdles		Andrea Giaconi	
Javelin throw		Francesco Pignata	
100 metres			Marco Torrieri
1500 metres			Christian Obrist
20 km walk			Michele Didoni
	2	4	3

==== Women ====
Event	1st place, gold medalist(s)	2nd place, silver medalist(s)	3rd place, bronze medalist(s)
400 metres hurdles	Benedetta Ceccarelli		Monika Niederstätter
Long jump	Fiona May		
Shot put	Cristiana Checchi		Chiara Rosa
Hammer throw	Ester Balassini	Clarissa Claretti	
20 km walk	Elisa Rigaudo		
Half marathon		Rosaria Console	
Discus throw		Laura Bordignon	
Javelin throw		Zahra Bani	
5000 metres			Silvia Weissteiner
4×100 metres relay			Daniela Bellanova; Manuela Grillo; Elena Sordelli; Doris Tomasini
	5	4	4

=== Others sport ===
==== Gold ====
Boxing

- Men's Light Flyweight (– 48 kg): Alfonso Pinto
- Men's Lightweight (– 60 kg): Domenico Valentino
- Men's Heavyweight (– 91 kg): Clemente Russo
- Men's Super Heavyweight (+ 91 kg): Roberto Cammarelle

Basketball

- Men's Team Competition: Giorgio Boscagin (Bipop Carire), Marco Carraretto (Leche Rio Breogan), Alessandro Cittadini (Navigo Teramo), Christian Digiuliomaria (Sedima Roseto), Luca Garri and Jacopo Giachetti (both Lottomatica Roma), Davide Lamma (Montepaschi Siena), Marco Mordente (Bipop Carire Reggio Emilia), Andrea Pecile (Montepaschi Siena), Tomas Ress (Scavolini Pesaro), Mason Richard Rocca (Pompea Napoli), and Walter Santarossa (Lauretana Biella)

Fencing

- Men's Individual Foil: Marco Vannini
- Men's Individual Sabre: Aldo Montano

Judo

- Men's Half-Middleweight (– 81 kg): Giuseppe Maddaloni
- Women's Middleweight (– 70 kg): Ylenia Scapin

Karate

- Men's + 80 kg: Stefano Maniscalco
- Men's Open Class: Stefano Maniscalco
- Men's – 55 kg: Ciro Massa
- Women's – 55 kg: Selene Guglielmi

Rowing

- Men's Single Sculls: Simone Raineri
- Men's Coxless Pairs: Luca Agamennoni and Dario Lari
- Men's Double Sculls: Alessio Sartori and Matteo Stefanini
- Women's Single Sculls: Elisabetta Sancassani

Shooting

- Men's 10m Air Pistol: Francesco Bruno
- Men's Trap: Giovanni Pellielo
- Men's Skeet: Ennio Falco
- Men's Double Trap: Marco Innocenti

Swimming

- Men's 200m Freestyle: David Berbotto
- Men's 400m Freestyle: Massimiliano Rosolino
- Men's 50m Breaststroke: Alessandro Terrin
- Men's 4 × 200 m Freestyle: Matteo Pelliciari, Emiliano Brembilla, Christian Galenda, and David Berbotto
- Women's 50m Freestyle: Cristina Chiuso
- Women's 1500m Freestyle: Elisa Pasini
- Women's 200m Backstroke: Alessia Filippi
- Women's 50m Breaststroke: Giulia Fabbri
- Women's 50m Butterfly: Elena Gemo
- Women's 100m Butterfly: Ambra Migliori
- Women's 200m Butterfly: Caterina Giacchetti
- Women's 400m Medley: Alessia Filippi

==== Silver ====
Fencing

- Men's Individual Foil: Matteo Zennaro
- Men's Individual Sabre: Luigi Tarantino
- Women's Individual Foil: Claudia Pigliapoco

Judo

- Men's Half-Lightweight (– 66 kg): Giovanni Casale
- Men's Heavyweight (+ 100 kg): Paolo Bianchessi
- Women's Extra-Lightweight (– 48 kg): Francesca Congia

Rowing

- Men's Lightweight Coxless Pairs: Catello Amarante and Salvatore Amitrano

Shooting

- Men's 50m Rifle Prone: Roberto Facheris
- Men's Trap: Massimo Fabbrizi
- Men's Skeet: Andrea Benelli
- Men's Double Trap: Daniele di Spigno

Swimming

- Men's 100m Freestyle: Filippo Magnini
- Men's 200m Breaststroke: Paolo Bossini
- Men's 50m Butterfly: Mattia Nalesso
- Men's 100m Butterfly: Lorenzo Benatti
- Men's 100m Medley: Alessio Boggiatto
- Women's 800m Freestyle: Elisa Pasini
- Women's 50m Freestyle: Elena Gemo
- Women's 200m Breaststroke: Sara Giovannoni

Water Polo

- Men's Team Competition: Leonardo Binchi, Fabrizio Buonocore, Alessandro Calcaterra, Luigi Di Costanzo, Maurizio Felugo, Francesco Ferrari, Goran Fiorentini, Giovanni Foresti, Andrea Mangiante, Raffaele Onofrietti, Bogdan Rath, Fabio Violetti, and Antonio Vittorioso

==== Bronze ====
Fencing

- Men's Individual Épée: Federico Bollati
- Women's Individual Foil: Marta Simoncelli
- Women's Individual Épée: Sara Cristina Cometti
- Women's Individual Épée: Veronica Ross

Judo

- Men's Extra-Lightweight (– 60 kg): Marco Caudana
- Men's Middleweight (– 90 kg): Francesco Lepre
- Women's Lightweight (– 57 kg): Laura Maddaloni
- Women's Half-Middleweight (– 63 kg): Giulia Quintavalle
- Women's Half-Heavyweight (– 78 kg): Lucia Morico
- Women's Heavyweight (+ 78 kg): Barbara Andolina

Karate

- Men's – 70 kg: Giuseppe di Domenico
- Women's + 65 kg: Greta Vitelli

Rowing

- Men's Lightweight Single Sculls: Lorenzo Bertini
- Men's Lightweight Double Sculls: Leonardo Pettinari and Nicola Moriconi

Shooting

- Men's 50m Rifle Prone: Marco de Nicolo
- Women's 10m Air Pistol: Manuela Franzoni

Swimming

- Men's 1500m Freestyle: Samuel Pizzetti
- Men's 200m Butterfly: Francesco Vespe
- Men's 4 × 100 m Medley: Enrico Catalano, Alessandro Terrin, Mattia Nalesso, David Berbotto
- Women's 100m Freestyle: Cristina Chiuso
- Women's 50m Butterfly: Francesca Segat
- Women's 100m Butterfly: Francesca Segat
- Women's 200m Butterfly: Francesca Segat
- Women's 200m Medley: Alessia Filippi
- Women's 4 × 200 m Freestyle: Simona Ricciardi, Alice Carpanese, Martina Cuppone, and Alessia Filippi
- Women's 4 × 100 m Medley: Alessia Filippi, Veronica Demozzi, Ambra Migliori, and Alice Carpanese

== See also ==
- Italy at the 2004 Summer Olympics
- Italy at the 2008 Summer Olympics
