= Swimming at the 2005 World Aquatics Championships – Men's 4 × 200 metre freestyle relay =

Men's 4 × 200 m Free Relay at the 2005 FINA World Aquatics Championships
- Dates: July 29, 2005
- Nations: 22
- Winning time: 7:05.75

Medalists
gold medal	United States
silver medal	Canada
bronze medal	Australia

The Men's 4x200 Freestyle Relay event at the 11th FINA World Aquatics Championships was swum on July 29, 2005, in Montreal, Canada. 22 teams swam in the event's preliminary heats in the day's morning session; with the top-8 finishers advancing to swim again in the event's final that evening.

At the start of the event, the existing World (WR) and Championships (CR) records were both:

7:04.66, Australia, swum July 27, 2001 in Fukuoka, Japan

== Results ==
=== Final ===
Place	Lane	Nation	Swimmers (split)	Time	Notes
1	4	United States	Michael Phelps (1:45.51), Ryan Lochte (1:48.22); Peter Vanderkaay (1:46.52), Klete Keller (1:46.33)	7:06.58	
2	3	Canada	Brent Hayden (1:47.10), Colin Russell (1:48.60); Rick Say (1:46.84), Andrew Hurd (1:47.19)	7:09.73	
3	6	Australia	Nicholas Sprenger (1:47.94), Patrick Murphy (1:49.04), Andrew Mewing (1:48.77), Grant Hackett (1:44.84)	7:10.59	
4	1	Italy	Emiliano Brembilla (1:48.94), David Berbotto (1:48.57); Massimiliano Rosolino (1:48.07), Filippo Magnini (1:47.23)	7:12.81	
5	5	Japan	Yoshihiro Okumura (1:49.06), Sho Uchida (1:48.15); Daisuke Hosokawa (1:48.73), Takeshi Matsuda (1:47.66)	7:13.60	
6	8	Russia	Dmitry Semenov (1:49.86), Andrey Kapralov (1:50.12); Maxim Kuznetsov (1:49.24), Yuri Prilukov (1:47.87)	7:17.09	
7	7	Germany	Paul Biedermann (1:49.16), Stefan Herbst (1:47.77); Jens Schreiber (1:50.25), Benjamin Starke (1:50.34)	7:17.52	
8	2	Greece	Andreas Zisimos (1:50.36), Apostolos Antonopoulos (1:51.84); Dimitrios Manganas (1:49.08), Nikolaos Xylouris (1:48.76)	7:20.04	

=== Preliminaries ===
Rank	Heat+Lane	Nation	Swimmers (split)	Time	Notes
1	H2 L4	United States	Jayme Cramer (1:49.19), Peter Vanderkaay (1:47.73), Matthew McGinnis (1:48.30), Klete Keller (1:46.84)	7:12.06	q
2	H3 L3	Japan	Sho Uchida (1:49.36), Hisayoshi Sato (1:48.93), Daisuke Hosokawa (1:48.80), Takeshi Matsuda (1:48.07)	7:15.16	q
3	H3 L5	Canada	Andrew Hurd (1:49.81), Colin Russell (1:48.88), Brent Hayden (1:47.76), Rick Say (1:49.21)	7:15.66	q
4	H3 L4	Australia	Andrew Mewing (1:49.97), Brendon Hughes (1:49.37), Adam Lucas (1:50.04), Nicholas Sprenger (1:47.07)	7:16.45	q
5	H1 L5	Greece	Andreas Zisimos (1:50.04), Apostolos Antonopoulos (1:49.84), Dimitrios Manganas (1:48.46), Nikos Xylouris (1:48.23)	7:16.57	q
6	H2 L5	Germany	Paul Biedermann (1:49.06), Benjamin Starke (1:50.39), Stefan Herbst (1:48.34), Jens Schreiber (1:48.93)	7:16.72	q
7	H1 L4	Italy	David Berbotto (1:49.47), Matteo Pelliciari (1:48.82), Luca Pasteris (1:50.33), Massimiliano Rosolino (1:48.72)	7:17.34	q
8	H1 L3	Russia	Maxim Kuznetsov (1:50.08), Dmitry Semenov (1:48.17), Evgeny Natsvin (1:50.37), Evgeny Lagunov (1:50.68)	7:19.30	q
9	H3 L8	Poland	Paweł Korzeniowski (1:48.98), Lukasz Drzewinski (1:50.57), Michal Rokicki (1:51.48), Przemysław Stańczyk (1:49.46)	7:20.49	
10	H3 L6	Ukraine	Sergiy Fesenko (1:50.42), Sergii Advena (1:50.28), Dmytro Vereitinov (1:51.27), Maksym Kokosha (1:49.45)	7:21.42	NR
11	H2 L3	China	Peng Wu (1:50.55), Cheng Yu (1:49.74), Kunliang Zheng (1:51.87), Lin Zhang (1:49.97)	7:22.13	
12	H1 L2	Netherlands	Robin van Aggele (1:50.31), Thomas Felten (1:52.13), Bas van Velthoven (1:53.51), Stefan Oosting (1:51.55)	7:27.50	
13	H1 L6	Portugal	Tiago Venâncio (1:51.06), Luís Monteiro (1:53.17), Adriano Niz (1:51.55), Fabio Pereira (1:51.97)	7:27.75	
14	H2 L6	Czech Republic	Michal Rubáček (1:51.29), Jiri Dub (1:52.81), Dominik Bartos (1:54.67), Květoslav Svoboda (1:49.50)	7:28.27	
15	H3 L2	Lithuania	Saulius Binevičius (1:52.83), Paulius Andrijauskas (1:52.04), Paulius Viktoravicius (1:52.59), Pavel Suskov (1:53.11)	7:30.57	
16	H2 L1	Chile	Maximiliano Schnettler (1:54.49), Giancarlo Zolezzi (1:53.37), Carlos Castro (1:57.19), Salvador Mallat (1:54.98)	7:40.03	
17	H2 L2	Singapore	Bryan Tay (1:55.38), Jeffrey Su (1:58.82), Gary Tan (1:55.92), Mark Chay (1:56.27)	7:46.39	
18	H3 L7	Uzbekistan	Timur Irgashev (1:54.84), Ibrahim Nazarov (1:56.49), Sergey Tsoy (1:58.77), Danil Bugakov (1:57.41)	7:47.51	
19	H1 L1	Kuwait	Mansoor Al-Mansoor (1:57.38), Mohamed Madwa (2:00.30), Nawaf Al-Wazzan (1:57.18), Waleed Al-Qahtani (1:59.97)	7:54.83	
20	H2 L7	Virgin Islands	Kieran Locke (1:58.00), Kevin Hensley (2:00.26), Morgan Locke (2:00.02), Josh Laban (1:59.18)	7:57.46	
21	H1 L7	Macau	Wing Cheun Wong (1:58.00), Antonio Tong (2:05.01), Kuan Fong Lao (2:05.68), Chan Wai Ma (2:09.96)	8:18.65	
-	H3 L1	Algeria	Nabil Kebbab (1:51.64), Mahrez Mebarek (-), Sofiane Daid (-), Aghiles Slimani (-)	DQ	
