= Swimming at the 2005 Mediterranean Games =

The swimming competition at the 2005 Mediterranean Games was held in the Las Almadrabillas Sports Centre in Almería, Spain from 24–28 June 2005. It was a long course (50 metres) event.

== Medallists ==
=== Men's events ===
Event	Gold		Silver		Bronze	
50 m freestyle	Salim Iles (ALG)	22.31	Eduardo Lorente (ESP)	22.52	Jernej Godec (SLO)	22.71
100 m freestyle	Salim Iles (ALG)	49.10	Filippo Magnini (ITA)	49.37	Nabil Kebbab (ALG)	49.68
200 m freestyle	David Berbotto (ITA)	1:50.00	Olaf Wildeboer (ESP)	1:50.17	Amaury Leveaux (FRA)	1:50.40
400 m freestyle	Massimiliano Rosolino (ITA)	3:48.79	Spyridon Gianniotis (GRE)	3:51.84	Sébastien Rouault (FRA)	3:52.14
800 m freestyle	Oussama Mellouli (TUN)	7:54.30	Sébastien Rouault (FRA)	7:54.66	Spyridon Gianniotis (GRE)	8:03.60
1500 m freestyle	Sébastien Rouault (FRA)	15:08.98	Spyridon Gianniotis (GRE)	15:24.84	Samuel Pizzetti (ITA)	15:27.77
50 m backstroke	Aristeidis Grigoriadis (GRE)	25.62	David Ortega (ESP)	25.81	Ahmed Hussein (EGY)	25.86
100 m backstroke	Aristeidis Grigoriadis (GRE)	55.75	Ahmed Hussein (EGY)	56.06	David Ortega (ESP)	56.08
200 m backstroke	Blaž Medvešek (SLO)	2:00.08	Gordan Kožulj (CRO)	2:00.48	Ahmed Hussein (EGY)	2:01.61
50 m breaststroke	Alessandro Terrin (ITA); Emil Tahirovič (SLO)	28.02			Matjaž Markič (SLO)	28.24
100 m breaststroke	Hugues Duboscq (FRA)	1:01.24	Romanos Alyfantis (GRE)	1:01.57	Emil Tahirovič (SLO)	1:01.73
200 m breaststroke	Hugues Duboscq (FRA)	2:13.98	Paolo Bossini (ITA)	2:15.15	Sofiane Daid (ALG)	2:16.54
50 m butterfly	Frédérick Bousquet (FRA)	24.30	Mattia Nalesso (ITA)	24.38	Alexei Puninski (CRO)	24.39
100 m butterfly	Peter Mankoč (SLO)	54.08	Lorenzo Benatti (ITA)	54.19	Romain Barnier (FRA)	54.24
200 m butterfly	Ioannis Drymonakos (GRE)	1:57.58	Aleš Aberšek (SLO)	1:59.37	Francesco Vespe (ITA)	1:59.68
200 m individual medley	Oussama Mellouli (TUN)	2:01.00	Alessio Boggiatto (ITA)	2:03.99	Brenton Cabello (ESP)	2:04.40
400 m individual medley	Oussama Mellouli (TUN)	4:14.34	Nicolas Rostoucher (FRA)	4:19.17	Ioannis Drymonakos (GRE)	4:19.37
4 × 100 m freestyle	France; Alain Bernard; Amaury Leveaux; Romain Barnier; Frédérick Bousquet	3:20.08	Spain; Saúl Santana; Eduardo Lorente; Olaf Wildeboer; Javier Noriega	3:22.46	Greece; Apostolos Antonopoulos; Andreas Zisimos; Apostolos Tsagkarakis; Aristeidis Grigoriadis	3:22.95
4 × 200 m freestyle	Italy; Matteo Pelliciari; Emiliano Brembilla; Christian Galenda; David Berbotto	7:18.48	Greece; Andreas Zisimos; Apostolos Antonopoulos; Dimitrios Manganas; Nikolaos Xylouris	7:19.87	France; Matthieu Madelaine; Amaury Leveaux; Guillaume Strohmeyer; Nicolas Rostoucher	7:24.20
4 × 100 m medley	Slovenia; Blaž Medvešek; Emil Tahirovič; Jernej Mencinger; Peter Mankoč	3:41.12	Spain; David Ortega; Iván Aguirre; Juan José Ulacía; Eduardo Lorente	3:42.29	Italy; Enrico Catalano; Alessandro Terrin; Mattia Nalesso; David Berbotto	3:42.33

=== Women's events ===
Event	Gold		Silver		Bronze	
50 m freestyle	Cristina Chiuso (ITA)	25.40	Céline Couderc (FRA)	25.77	Ana Belén Palomo (ESP)	26.13
100 m freestyle	Céline Couderc (FRA)	55.46	Solenne Figuès (FRA)	55.56	Cristina Chiuso (ITA)	56.14
200 m freestyle	Solenne Figuès (FRA)	1:59.49	Sara Isakovič (SLO)	1:59.61	Zoi Dimoschaki (GRE)	2:00.67
400 m freestyle	Laure Manaudou (FRA)	4:08.90	Sara Isakovič (SLO)	4:12.25	Zoi Dimoschaki (GRE)	4:13.00
800 m freestyle	Erika Villaécija García (ESP)	8:38.73	Elisa Pasini (ITA)	8:39.88	Sophie Huber (FRA)	8:46.55
1500 m freestyle	Elisa Pasini (ITA)	16:30.16	Erika Villaécija García (ESP)	16:40.11	Marianna Lymperta (GRE)	16:48.38
50 m backstroke	Laure Manaudou (FRA)	29.17	Elena Gemo (ITA)	29.20	Mercedes Peris (ESP)	29.22
100 m backstroke	Alexandra Putra (FRA)	1:02.33	Mercedes Peris (ESP)	1:02.85	Sanja Jovanović (CRO)	1:02.96
200 m backstroke	Alessia Filippi (ITA)	2:12.65	Esther Baron (FRA)	2:12.87	Alexandra Putra (FRA)	2:13.38
50 m breaststroke	Giulia Fabbri (ITA)	32.96	Dajana Zoretic (CRO)	33.15	Vasiliki Kavarnou (GRE)	33.23
100 m breaststroke	Anne-Sophie Le Paranthoën (FRA)	1:10.79	Sara Pérez (ESP)	1:11.36	Angeliki Exarchou (GRE)	1:11.69
200 m breaststroke	Sara Pérez (ESP)	2:28.87	Sara Giovannoni (ITA)	2:31.14	Belen Domenech (ESP)	2:31.36
50 m butterfly	Elena Gemo (ITA)	27.55	Sanja Jovanović (CRO)	27.82	Francesca Segat (ITA)	27.95
100 m butterfly	Ambra Migliori (ITA)	59.68	Mireia García (ESP)	1:00.13	Francesca Segat (ITA)	1:00.63
200 m butterfly	Caterina Giacchetti (ITA)	2:10.01	Mireia García (ESP)	2:11.33	Francesca Segat (ITA)	2:11.77
200 m individual medley	Anja Klinar (SLO)	2:16.04	Cylia Vabre (FRA)	2:16.79	Alessia Filippi (ITA)	2:18.01
400 m individual medley	Alessia Filippi (ITA)	4:40.61	Anja Klinar (SLO)	4:44.00	Sara Pérez (ESP)	4:47.77
4 × 100 m freestyle relay	France; Elsa N'Guessan; Angela Tavernier; Sophie Huber; Céline Couderc	3:47.83	Spain; Tatiana Rouba; Ilune Gorbea; Erika Villaécija García; María Fuster	3:48.16	Greece; Eleni Kosti; Zoi Dimoschaki; Zampia Melachroinou; Aikaterini Bliamou	3:49.70
4 × 200 m freestyle relay	France; Céline Couderc; Angela Tavernier; Elsa N'Guessan; Solenne Figuès	8:06.37	Spain; Arantxa Ramos; Noemi Feliz; Ilune Gorbea; Erika Villaécija García	8:10.11	Italy; Simona Ricciardi; Alice Carpanese; Martina Cuppone; Alessia Filippi	8:13.22
4 × 100 m medley relay	France; Alexandra Putra; Anne-Sophie Le Paranthoën; Aurore Mongel; Céline Couderc	4:09.01	Spain; Mercedes Peris; Sara Pérez; Mireia García; María Fuster	4:09.33	Italy; Alessia Filippi; Veronica Demozzi; Ambra Migliori; Alice Carpanese	4:11.85

== Medal table ==
Rank	Nation	Gold	Silver	Bronze	Total
1	France	14	6	7	27
2	Italy	12	8	10	30
3	Slovenia	5	4	3	12
4	Greece	3	4	9	16
5	Tunisia	3	0	0	3
6	Spain	2	13	6	21
7	Algeria	2	0	2	4
8	Croatia	0	3	3	6
9	Egypt	0	1	2	3
Totals (9 entries)		41	39	42	122
