= France at the 2005 Mediterranean Games =

- IOC code: FRA
- NOC: French Olympic Committee

in Almería
- Medals Ranked 2nd: Gold 56 Silver 51 Bronze 46 Total 153

Mediterranean Games appearances (overview)
- 1951; 1955; 1959; 1963; 1967; 1971; 1975; 1979; 1983; 1987; 1991; 1993; 1997; 2001; 2005; 2009; 2013; 2018; 2022; 2026

France (FRA) competed at the 2005 Mediterranean Games in Almería, Spain with a total number of 368 participants (213 men and 155 women).

== Medals ==
=== Gold ===
Boxing

- Men's Bantamweight (– 54 kg): Ali Hallab
- Men's Light Welterweight (– 64 kg): Alexis Vastine

Judo

- Men's Half-Heavyweight (– 100 kg): Ghislain Lemaire
- Women's Half-Lightweight (– 52 kg): Annabelle Euranie
- Women's Half-Middleweight (– 63 kg): Lucie Décosse

Rowing

- Men's Lightweight Single Sculls: Fabrice Moreau
- Men's Lightweight Coxless Pairs: Jean-Christophe Bette and Franck Solforosi

Swimming

- Men's 1500m Freestyle: Sébastien Rouault
- Men's 100m Breaststroke: Hugues Duboscq
- Men's 200m Breaststroke: Hugues Duboscq
- Men's 50m Butterfly: Frédérick Bousquet
- Men's 4 × 100 m Freestyle: Alain Bernard, Amaury Leveaux, Romain Barnier, and Frédérick Bousquet
- Women's 100m Freestyle: Céline Couderc
- Women's 200m Freestyle: Solenne Figuès
- Women's 400m Freestyle: Laure Manaudou
- Women's 50m Backstroke: Laure Manaudou
- Women's 100m Backstroke: Alexandra Putra
- Women's 100m Breastkstroke: Anne-Sophie Le Paranthoën
- Women's 4 × 100 m Freestyle: Elsa N'Guessan, Angela Tavernier, Sophie Huber, and Céline Couderc
- Women's 4 × 200 m Freestyle: Céline Couderc, Angela Tavernier, Elsa N'Guessan, and Solenne Figuès
- Women's 4 × 100 m Medley: Alexandra Putra, Anne-Sophie Le Paranthoën, Aurore Mongel, and Céline Couderc

=== Silver ===
Boxing

- Men's Welterweight (– 69 kg): Xavier Noel
- Men's Super Heavyweight (+ 91 kg): Mohamed Samoudi

Judo

- Women's Half-Heavyweight (– 78 kg): Stéphanie Possamaï

Rowing

- Men's Lightweight Double Sculls: Frédéric Dufour and Arnaud Pornin
- Women's Single Sculls: Caroline Delas

Swimming

- Men's 800m Freestyle: Sébastien Rouault
- Men's 400m Medley: Nicolas Rostoucher
- Women's 50m Freestyle: Céline Couderc
- Women's 100m Freestyle: Solenne Figuès
- Women's 200m Backstroke: Esther Baron
- Women's 200m Medley: Cylia Vabre

=== Bronze ===
Boxing

- Men's Middleweight (– 75 kg): Mamadou Diambang
- Men's Heavyweight (– 91 kg): Newfel Ouatah

Judo

- Men's Lightweight (– 73 kg): Anthony Fritsch
- Women's Lightweight (– 57 kg): Fanny Riaboff

Swimming

- Men's 200m Freestyle: Amaury Leveaux
- Men's 400m Freestyle: Sébastien Rouault
- Men's 100m Butterfly: Romain Barnier
- Men's 4 × 200 m Freestyle: Matthieu Madelaine, Amaury Leveaux, Guillaume Strohmeyer, and Nicolas Rostoucher
- Women's 800m Freestyle: Sophie Huber
- Women's 200m Backstroke: Alexandra Putra

== Results by event ==
=== Boxing ===
- Men's Flyweight (– 51 kg)
  - Jérôme Thomas
- Men's Bantamweight (– 54 kg)
  - Ali Hallab
- Men's Featherweight (– 57 kg)
  - Khedafi Djelkhir
- Men's Lightweight (– 60 kg)
  - Boubacar Dangnoko
- Men's Light Welterweight (– 64 kg)
  - Alexis Vastine
- Men's Welterweight (– 69 kg)
  - Xavier Noel
- Men's Middleweight (– 75 kg)
  - Mamamoud Diambang
- Men's Light Heavyweight (– 81 kg)
  - John Dovi
- Men's Heavyweight (– 91 kg)
  - Newfel Ouatah
- Men's Super Heavyweight (+ 91 kg)
  - Mohamed Samoudi

=== Volleyball ===
==== Men's team competition ====
- Team Roster
  - Bertrand Carletti
  - Andy Ces
  - Vincent Duhagon
  - Jean-François Exiga
  - Gary Gendrey
  - Xavier Kapfer
  - Florian Kilama
  - Olivier Lamoise
  - Yann Lavallez
  - Marien Moreau
  - Jean-François Perez
  - Gael Vandaele

==== Women's team competition ====
- Team Roster
  - Anne Andrieux
  - Corinne Cardassay
  - Coralie Larnack
  - Severine Lienard
  - Jenifer Marechal
  - Alexandra Rochelle
  - Anna Rybaczewski
  - Pauline Soullard
  - Audrey Syren
  - Leslie Turiaf
  - Stéphanie Volle

=== Water Polo ===
- Team Roster
  - Andres Aguilar
  - Marc Amardeilh
  - Brice Boust
  - Benoit Bry
  - Alexandre Chevalier
  - Quentin Chipotel
  - Yann Clay
  - Aurelien Cousin
  - Remi Garsau
  - Mathieu Peisson
  - Thibaut Simon
  - Yann Vergeade
  - Yann Vernoux

== See also ==
- France at the 2004 Summer Olympics
- France at the 2008 Summer Olympics
