= Weightlifting at the 2005 Mediterranean Games =

The weightlifting competitions at the 2005 Mediterranean Games in Almería took place between 25 June and 30 June at the Antonio Rivera Youth Sports Hall.

Athletes competed in 26 events across 13 weight categories (8 for men and 5 for women). Two Women's (75 kg and +75 kg) category will not be held because too few nations applied.

== Medal table ==
Key:

* Host nation (Spain)

Rank	Nation	Gold	Silver	Bronze	Total
1	Turkey	7	7	3	17
2	Egypt	7	4	4	15
3	Spain*	3	4	5	12
4	Tunisia	3	2	3	8
5	France	2	3	2	7
6	Greece	1	1	3	5
7	Italy	1	1	1	3
8	Algeria	1	1	0	2
9	Libya	1	0	0	1
10	Albania	0	2	3	5
11	Syria	0	1	1	2
12	Cyprus	0	0	1	1
Totals (12 entries)		26	26	26	78

== Medal summary ==
=== Men's events ===
Event		Gold	Silver	Bronze
56 kg	Snatch	Gülbeyi Aktı (TUR)	Eric Bonnel (FRA)	Khalil Maaquiya (TUN)
56 kg	Clean & Jerk	Eric Bonnel (FRA)	Gülbeyi Aktı (TUR)	Nayden Rusev (CYP)
62 kg	Snatch	Atef Jarray (TUN)	Sedat Artuç (TUR)	Samson Ndicka (FRA)
62 kg	Clean & Jerk	Sedat Artuç (TUR)	Samson Ndicka (FRA)	Gert Trasha (ALB)
69 kg	Snatch	Youssef Sbai (TUN)	Yasin Arslan (TUR)	Ekrem Celil (TUR)
69 kg	Clean & Jerk	Ekrem Celil (TUR)	Youssef Sbai (TUN)	Giorgio De Luca (ITA)
77 kg	Snatch	Sergio Martínez (ESP)	Mehmet Yılmaz (TUR)	Hussein Othman (EGY)
77 kg	Clean & Jerk	Hussein Othman (EGY)	Reyhan Arabacıoğlu (TUR)	Mehmet Yılmaz (TUR)
85 kg	Snatch	Mohamed Eshtiwi (LBA)	Ilirian Suli (ALB)	David Matam (FRA)
85 kg	Clean & Jerk	David Matam (FRA)	José Juan Navarro (ESP)	Ilirian Suli (ALB)
94 kg	Snatch	Santiago Martínez (ESP)	Moez Hannachi (TUN)	Mohammed El Nagar (EGY)
94 kg	Clean & Jerk	Nikolaos Kourtidis (GRE)	Mohammed El Nagar (EGY)	Ahmed Mohamed (EGY)
105 kg	Snatch	Ibrahim Morsy (EGY)	Bünyamin Sudaş (TUR)	Ahed Joughili (SYR)
105 kg	Clean & Jerk	Bünyamin Sudaş (TUR)	Ahed Joughili (SYR)	Ibrahim Morsy (EGY)
+105 kg	Snatch	Abdessatar Habbasi (TUN)	Mohamed Ehssan Massoud (EGY)	Dimitrios Papageridis (GRE)
+105 kg	Clean & Jerk	Mohamed Ehssan Massoud (EGY)	Dimitrios Papageridis (GRE)	Abdessatar Habbasi (TUN)

=== Women's events ===
Event		Gold	Silver	Bronze
48 kg	Snatch	Rebeca Sires (ESP)	Genny Pagliaro (ITA)	Gema Peris (ESP)
48 kg	Clean & Jerk	Genny Pagliaro (ITA)	Sibel Özkan (TUR)	Gema Peris (ESP)
53 kg	Snatch	Nurcan Taylan (TUR)	Estefania Juan (ESP)	Soumaya Fatnassi (TUN)
53 kg	Clean & Jerk	Nurcan Taylan (TUR)	Fetie Kasaj (ALB)	Estefania Juan (ESP)
58 kg	Snatch	Emine Bilgin (TUR)	Esmat Ahmed (EGY)	Romela Begaj (ALB)
58 kg	Clean & Jerk	Esmat Ahmed (EGY)	Souad Dinar (FRA)	Emine Bilgin (TUR)
63 kg	Snatch	Hebaialla Abdel Rhim (EGY)	Leila Lassouani (ALG)	Olympia Toka (GRE)
63 kg	Clean & Jerk	Leila Lassouani (ALG)	Hebaialla Abdel Rhim (EGY)	Olympia Toka (GRE)
69 kg	Snatch	Nahla Ramadan (EGY)	Lydia Valentín (ESP)	Tatiana Fernández (ESP)
69 kg	Clean & Jerk	Nahla Ramadan (EGY)	Tatiana Fernández (ESP)	Lydia Valentín (ESP)
