= Sailing at the 2005 Mediterranean Games =

- Venue: Club de Mar Almería

The sailing events at the 2005 Mediterranean Games were organized by the Club de Mar in Almería, Spain. Athletes competed in three men's and two women's events.

== Medal summary ==
=== Men's events ===
Event	Gold	Silver	Bronze
Mistral	Julien Bontemps (FRA)	Nicolas Huguet (FRA)	Iván Pastor (ESP)
Laser	Vasilij Žbogar (SLO)	Diego Negri (ITA)	Thomas Le Breton (FRA)
470	Italy (ITA); Gabrio Zandonà; Francesco Della Torre	Italy (ITA); Enrico Fonda; Pietro Zucchetti	Croatia (CRO); Ante Ćesić; Ante Kujundžić

=== Women's events ===
Event	Gold	Silver	Bronze
Laser	Sophie De Turckheim (FRA)	Solenne Brain (FRA)	Efi Mantzaraki (GRE)
470	France (FRA); Camille Lecointre; Gwendolyn Lemaitre	Spain (ESP); Natalia Vía Dufresne; Laia Tutzó	Slovenia (SLO); Teja Černe; Alja Černe

=== Medal table ===
Rank	Nation	Gold	Silver	Bronze	Total
1	France	3	2	1	6
2	Italy	1	2	0	3
3	Slovenia	1	0	1	2
4	Spain	0	1	1	2
5	Croatia	0	0	1	1
5	Greece	0	0	1	1
Totals (6 entries)		5	5	5	15
