= Slovenia at the 2005 Mediterranean Games =

- IOC code: SLO
- NOC: Olympic Committee of Slovenia

in Almería
- Medals Ranked 8th: Gold 10 Silver 8 Bronze 17 Total 35

Mediterranean Games appearances (overview)
- 1993; 1997; 2001; 2005; 2009; 2013; 2018; 2022

Other related appearances
- Yugoslavia (1951–1991)

Slovenia (SLO) competed at the 2005 Mediterranean Games in Almería, Spain. The nation had a total number of 159 participants (98 men and 61 women).

== Medals ==
=== Gold ===
Athletics

- Men's 100 metres: Matic Osovnikar
- Men's 200 metres: Matic Osovnikar
- Women's 200 metres: Alenka Bikar

Gymnastics

- Men's Parallel Bars: Mitja Petkovšek

Swimming

- Men's 200 m backstroke: Blaž Medvešek
- Men's 50 m breaststroke: Emil Tahirovič
- Men's 100 m breaststroke: Peter Mankoč
- Men's 4×100 m medley relay: Blaž Medvešek, Emil Tahirovič, Jernej Mencinger, and Peter Mankoč
- Women's 200 m individual medley: Anja Klinar

Sailing

- Men's Laser: Vasilij Žbogar

=== Silver ===
Athletics

- Men's Discus: Igor Primc

Judo

- Men's Extra-Lightweight (– 60 kg): Rok Drakšič
- Men's Half-Middleweight (– 81 kg): Klemen Ferjan
- Women's Middleweight (– 70 kg): Raša Sraka

Swimming

- Men's 200 m butterfly: Aleš Aberšek
- Women's 200 m freestyle: Sara Isakovič
- Women's 400 m freestyle: Sara Isakovič
- Women's 400 m individual medley: Anja Klinar

=== Bronze ===
Archery

- Women's Team Competition: Barbara Križe, Darja Verbič, and Dolores Čekada

Athletics

- Men's 4 × 100 metres: Matic Osovnikar, Matjaž Borovina, Boštjan Fridrih, Damjan Zlatnar, and Jan Žumer
- Women's 100 metres: Kristina Žumer

Bowls

- Progressive Throw: Bojan Novak

Boxing

- Men's Light Heavyweight (– 81 kg): Robert Kramberger

Canoeing

- K-1 1.000m: Jernej Župančič Regent

Judo

- Women's Half-Lightweight (– 52 kg): Petra Nareks
- Women's Half-Middleweight (– 63 kg): Urška Žolnir

Karate

- Women's – 55 kg: Teja Savor

Rowing

- Men's Single Sculls: Davor Mizerit
- Men's Double Sculls: Rok Kolander and Matej Prelog

Swimming

- Men's 50 m freestyle: Jernej Godec
- Men's 50 m breaststroke: Matjaž Markič
- Men's 100 m breaststroke: Emil Tahirovič

Tennis

- Men's doubles: Boštjan Ošabnik and Grega Žemlja

Table tennis

- Men's doubles: Saša Ignjatović and Bojan Tokić

Sailing

- Women's 470: Teja Černe and Alja Černe

== Results by event ==
=== Archery ===
Men's Individual

- Matej Povž
- Matija Žlender
- Matej Zupanc

Women's Individual

- Barbara Križe
- Darja Verbič
- Dolores Čekada

Women's Team

- Barbara Križe
- Darja Verbič
- Dolores Čekada

=== Athletics ===
- Alenka Bikar
- Matjaž Borovina
- Boštjan Fridrih
- Brigita Langerholc
- Meta Mačus
- Teja Melink
- Sara Orešnik
- Matic Osovnikar
- Andrej Poljanec
- Rožle Prezelj
- Igor Primc
- Snežana Rodić
- Sonja Roman
- Jurij Rovan
- Miroslav Vodovnik
- Damjan Zlatnar
- Boštjan Šimunič
- Jan Žumer
- Kristina Žumer

=== Handball ===
==== Men's team competition ====
- Preliminary round (group 4)

- Defeated Italy (27:30)
- Lost to Tunisia (23:25)

- Quarterfinals

- Lost to Serbia and Montenegro (30:33)

- Classification Matches

- 5th/8th place: Defeated Greece (28:25)
- 5th/6th place: Lost to Egypt (30:31) → 6th place

- Team roster

- Dušan Podpečan
- Gregor Lorger
- Miladin Kozlina
- Rok Ivančič
- Boštjan Kavaš
- Jure Dobelšek
- Boštjan Hribar
- Marko Oštir
- Jure Natek
- Goran Kozomara
- Robert Konečnik
- Aleš Pajovič
- Aleš Sirk
- Matjaž Mlakar
- Luka Žvižej
- Primož Prošt

- Head coach: Slavko Ivezič

==== Women's team competition ====
- Team roster

- Anja Argenti
- Maja Breznik
- Monika Frol
- Manuela Hrnjič
- Neli Irman
- Tadeja Korelc
- Miša Marinček
- Kristina Mihić
- Nina Potočnik
- Darja Rajšič
- Tina Sotler
- Urška Wertl
- Katja Čerenjak
- Tanja Čigoja
- Biljana Čulibrk
- Jelena Čvorak

- Head coach: Robert Begus

=== Judo ===
- Matjaž Ceraj
- Rok Drakšič
- Klemen Ferjan
- Primož Ferjan
- Tina Kukec
- Petra Nareks
- Raša Sraka
- Urška Žolnir

=== Karate ===
- Marijana Jularič
- Matjaž Končina
- Dejan Vozlič
- Teja Šavor

=== Swimming ===
- Aleš Aberšek
- Jernej Godec
- Sara Isakovič
- Anja Klinar
- Peter Mankoč
- Matjaž Markič
- Blaž Medvešek
- Jernej Mencinger
- Marko Milenkovič
- Monika Močnik
- Jasna Ovsenik
- Matjaž Pernat
- Tamara Sambrailo
- Nina Sovinek
- Emil Tahirovič
- Luka Turk
- Anja Čarman

=== Water polo ===
- Boban Antonijevič
- Žiga Balderman
- Erik Bukovac
- Teo Galič
- Jernej Lovše
- Aleksander Mertelj
- Tomaž Mihelčič
- Jure Nastran
- Matej Nastran
- Primož Troppan
- Blaž Verač
- Miha Vreček
- Andrija Šulič

== See also ==
- Slovenia at the 2004 Summer Olympics
- Slovenia at the 2008 Summer Olympics
