= Greece at the 2005 Mediterranean Games =

- IOC code: GRE
- NOC: Hellenic Olympic Committee

in Almería
- Competitors: 341
- Medals Ranked 6th: Gold 13 Silver 15 Bronze 31 Total 59

Mediterranean Games appearances (overview)
- 1951; 1955; 1959; 1963; 1967; 1971; 1975; 1979; 1983; 1987; 1991; 1993; 1997; 2001; 2005; 2009; 2013; 2018; 2022; 2026

Greece (GRE) competed at the 2005 Mediterranean Games in Almería, Spain. The nation had a total number of 341 participants (207 men and 134 women).

== Medals ==
=== Gold ===
Athletics

- Pole vault: Konstantinos Filippidis
- Triple jump: Hristos Meletoglou
- javelin throw: Aggeliki Tsiolakoudi
- 400 metres: Dimitra Ntova

Judo

- Men's Middleweight (– 90 kg): Ilias Iliadis

Rowing

- Men's Lightweight Double Sculls: Vasileios Polymeros and Nikolaos Skiathitis

Swimming

- Men's 50m Backstroke: Aristeidis Grigoriadis
- Men's 100m Backstroke: Aristeidis Grigoriadis
- Men's 200m Butterfly: Ioannis Drymonakos

Wrestling

- Grecoroman(120 kg) Xenofon Koutsioumpas
- Freestyle (174 kg) Theodosios Pavlidis
- Freestyle (48 kg) Fani Psatha

=== Silver ===
Wrestling

-Men's grecoroman(96 kg) Koutsioumpas Georgios

Athletics

- Heptathlon: Argyro Strataki
- Hammer throw: Alexandros Papadimitriou

Basketball

- Men's Team Competition: Nikolaos Barlos, Anastasios Charismidis, Dimitrios Charitopoulos, Georgios Dedas, Ioannis Georgallis, Savvas Iliadis, Panayiotis Kafkis, Theofanis Koumpouras, Nikolaos Papanikolopoulos, Angelos Siamantouras, Christos Tapoutos, and Georgios Tsiakos

Judo

- Women's Lightweight (– 57 kg): Ioulieta Boukouvala

Rowing

- Men's Coxless Pairs: Ioannis Christou and Nikolaos Pagounis
- Women's Lightweight Single Sculls: Chrysi Biskitzi

Swimming

- Men's 400m Freestyle: Spyridon Gianniotis
- Men's 1500m Freestyle: Spyridon Gianniotis
- Men's 100m Breaststroke: Romanos Alyfantis
- Men's 4 × 200 m Freestyle Relay: Andreas Zisimos, Apostolos Antonopoulos, Dimitrios Manganas, and Nikolaos Xylouris

=== Bronze ===
Athletics

- Triple jump: Hrysopiyi Devetzi
- 100 metres hurdles: Flora Redoumi
- Pole vault: Afroditi Skafida
- Hammer throw: Alexandra Papageorgiou
- 400 metres hurdles: Platon Gkavelas
- Long jump: Stergios Nousios

Boxing

- Men's Lightweight (– 60 kg): Orestis Saridis

Judo

- Men's Half-Heavyweight (– 100 kg): Dionysios Iliadis

Swimming

- Men's 800m Freestyle: Spyridon Gianniotis
- Men's 400m Medley: Ioannis Drymonakos
- Men's 4 × 100 m Freestyle Relay: Apostolos Antonopoulos, Andreas Zisimos, Apostolos Tsagkarakis, and Aristeidis Grigoriadis
- Women's 200m Freestyle: Zoi Dimoschaki
- Women's 400m Freestyle: Zoi Dimoschaki
- Women's 1500m Freestyle: Marianna Lymperta
- Women's 50m Breaststroke: Vasiliki Kavarnou
- Women's 100m Breaststroke: Angeliki Exarchou
- Women's 4 × 100 m Freestyle Relay: Eleni Kosti, Zoi Dimoschaki, Zampia Melachroinou, and Aikaterini Bliamou

== Results by event ==
=== Water Polo ===
- Team Roster

- Evangelos Delakas
- Daniil Dikaios
- Konstantinos Flegkas
- Georgios Fountoulis
- Ioannis Fountoulis
- Dionysios Karountzos
- Vasileios Liotsakis
- Dimitrios Miteloudis
- Nikolaos Ntoulos
- Georgios Stakias
- Nikolaos Stellatos

== See also ==
- Greece at the 2004 Summer Olympics
- Greece at the 2008 Summer Olympics
