= Swimming at the 2004 Summer Olympics – Women's 100 metre butterfly =

Women's 100 metre butterfly at the Games of the XXVIII Olympiad
- Venue: Athens Olympic Aquatic Centre
- Date: August 14, 2004 (heats & semifinals); August 15, 2004 (final)
- Competitors: 38 from 30 nations
- Winning time: 57.72

Medalists
1st place, gold medalist(s)		Petria Thomas	Australia
2nd place, silver medalist(s)		Otylia Jędrzejczak	Poland
3rd place, bronze medalist(s)		Inge de Bruijn	Netherlands

The women's 100 metre butterfly event at the 2004 Olympic Games was contested at the Olympic Aquatic Centre of the Athens Olympic Sports Complex in Athens, Greece on August 14 and 15.

Australia's Petria Thomas, who finished fourth in Sydney, won her first individual gold medal in this event, outside the Olympic record time of 57.72 seconds. The silver medal was awarded to Poland's Otylia Jędrzejczak, who trailed behind Thomas by 0.12 of a second, in an outstanding time of 57.84. Defending Olympic champion and world record holder Inge de Bruijn of the Netherlands, on the other hand, took home the bronze at 57.99 seconds.

== Records ==
Prior to this competition, the existing world and Olympic records were as follows.

World record	Inge de Bruijn (NED)	56.61	Sydney, Australia	17 September 2000
Olympic record	Inge de Bruijn (NED)	56.61	Sydney, Australia	17 September 2000

== Results ==
=== Heats ===
Rank	Heat	Lane	Name	Nationality	Time	Notes
1	5	4	Petria Thomas	Australia	57.47	Q
2	4	5	Otylia Jędrzejczak	Poland	57.84	Q, NR
3	5	5	Inge de Bruijn	Netherlands	58.47	Q
4	3	4	Martina Moravcová	Slovakia	58.48	Q
5	5	7	Jessicah Schipper	Australia	58.57	Q
6	4	4	Jenny Thompson	United States	58.77	Q
7	5	3	Junko Onishi	Japan	59.22	Q
8	5	6	Malia Metella	France	59.38	Q
8	3	3	Rachel Komisarz	United States	59.38	Q
10	4	2	Ambra Migliori	Italy	59.47	Q
11	5	1	Franziska van Almsick	Germany	59.53	Q, WD
12	4	6	Zhou Yafei	China	59.62	Q
13	3	2	Natalya Sutyagina	Russia	59.76	Q
14	3	5	Alena Popchanka	Belarus	59.77	Q
15	2	4	Mette Jacobsen	Denmark	59.81	Q
16	4	3	Anna-Karin Kammerling	Sweden	59.84	Q
17	3	1	Yuko Nakanishi	Japan	1:00.16	Q
18	3	8	Beatrix Boulsevicz	Hungary	1:00.18	
19	2	3	Eirini Kavarnou	Greece	1:00.43	
20	4	1	Georgina Lee	Great Britain	1:00.45	
21	4	8	Chantal Groot	Netherlands	1:00.49	
22	5	8	Francesca Segat	Italy	1:00.56	
23	2	5	Elizabeth Coster	New Zealand	1:00.61	
23	3	6	Johanna Sjöberg	Sweden	1:00.61	
25	4	7	Aurore Mongel	France	1:00.65	
26	3	7	Vered Borochovski	Israel	1:00.69	
27	2	6	Joscelin Yeo	Singapore	1:00.81	
28	5	2	Xu Yanwei	China	1:01.53	
29	2	2	Maria Papadopoulou	Cyprus	1:02.01	
30	1	6	Kateryna Zubkova	Ukraine	1:02.22	
31	2	1	Kolbrún Yr Kristjánsdóttir	Iceland	1:02.33	
32	2	8	Sze Hang Yu	Hong Kong	1:02.42	
33	2	7	Park Kyung-hwa	South Korea	1:02.52	
34	1	4	Cheng Wan-jung	Chinese Taipei	1:02.94	
35	1	5	Gülşah Günenç	Turkey	1:04.30	
36	1	2	Angela Galea	Malta	1:05.47	
37	1	3	Mariya Bugakova	Uzbekistan	1:07.08	
38	1	7	Natasha Sara Georgeos	Saint Lucia	1:07.94	

=== Semifinals ===
==== Semifinal 1 ====
Rank	Lane	Name	Nationality	Time	Notes
1	4	Otylia Jędrzejczak	Poland	58.10	Q
2	5	Martina Moravcová	Slovakia	58.66	Q
3	3	Jenny Thompson	United States	58.91	Q
4	6	Rachel Komisarz	United States	59.34	
5	2	Ambra Migliori	Italy	59.53	
5	8	Yuko Nakanishi	Japan	59.53	
7	1	Mette Jacobsen	Denmark	59.72	
8	7	Natalya Sutyagina	Russia	59.79	

==== Semifinal 2 ====
Rank	Lane	Name	Nationality	Time	Notes
1	5	Inge de Bruijn	Netherlands	57.50	Q
2	4	Petria Thomas	Australia	57.93	Q
3	3	Jessicah Schipper	Australia	58.63	Q
4	1	Alena Popchanka	Belarus	58.97	Q
5	6	Junko Onishi	Japan	59.24	Q
5	2	Malia Metella	France	59.28	
7	8	Anna-Karin Kammerling	Sweden	59.33	
8	7	Zhou Yafei	China	59.48	

=== Final ===
Rank	Lane	Swimmer	Nation	Time	Notes
1st place, gold medalist(s)	5	Petria Thomas	Australia	57.72	
2nd place, silver medalist(s)	3	Otylia Jędrzejczak	Poland	57.84	
3rd place, bronze medalist(s)	4	Inge de Bruijn	Netherlands	57.99	
4	6	Jessicah Schipper	Australia	58.22	
5	7	Jenny Thompson	United States	58.72	
6	2	Martina Moravcová	Slovakia	58.96	
7	1	Alena Popchanka	Belarus	59.06	
8	8	Junko Onishi	Japan	59.83	
