= Apostolos Tsagkarakis =

Greek swimmer (born 1982)

Personal information
- Full name: Apostolos Tsagkarakis
- National team: Greece
- Born: 19 February 1982 (age 44) Athens, Greece
- Height: 1.93 m (6 ft 4 in)
- Weight: 97 kg (214 lb)

Sport
- Sport: Swimming
- Strokes: Freestyle, butterfly
- College team: University of Alabama (U.S.)
- Coach: Don Gambril (U.S.)
Medal record
Men's swimming
Representing Greece
Mediterranean Games
Bronze medal – third place	2005 Almería	4×100 m freestyle
Bronze medal – third place	2009 Pescara	4×100 m freestyle

Apostolos Tsagkarakis (Greek: Απόστολος Τσαγκαράκης; born February 19, 1982) is a Greek former swimmer, who specialized in sprint freestyle events. Regarding as one of Greece's most popular swimmers in a global standard, Tsagkarakis is a 13-time swimming champion, 12-time All-American honoree, and a 20-time national record holder in both freestyle and butterfly (50 and 100 m). He is also one of two Greek swimmers, alongside Spyridon Bitsakis, who trained for the Alabama Crimson Tide, under head coach Don Gambril, at the University of Alabama in Tuscaloosa.

== Career ==
=== Collegiate career ===
Tsagkarakis attended the University of Alabama in Tuscaloosa, Alabama, on an athletic scholarship, and played for the Alabama Crimson Tide swimming and diving team under head coach Don Gambril from 2002 to 2007. While swimming for the Crimson Tide, he received a total of twelve All-American honors, and held school records in the 50-, 200-, and 400-m freestyle. In his senior season, Tsagkarakis was chosen by the university to take part in ESPN The Magazine Academic All-America Men's At-Large Teams, following his major breakthrough from the NCAA Swimming Championships. In the spring of 2007, Tsagkarakis graduated from the university with a bachelor's degree in health care management.

=== International career ===
Tsagkarakis made his international debut at the 2002 European Short Course Swimming Championships in Riesa, Germany, where he finished outside the medals with a fourth-place effort in the 50 m butterfly (23.75).

At the 2003 FINA World Championships in Barcelona, Spain, Tsagkarakis failed to reach the top 16 in any of his individual events, finishing forty-sixth in the 50 m freestyle (23.42), and forty-ninth in the 100 m freestyle (51.73).

When his nation Greece hosted the 2004 Summer Olympics in Athens, Tsagkarakis competed only in the 50 m freestyle. He achieved a FINA B-standard of 22.90 from an Olympic test event at the Athens Olympic Aquatic Centre. Despite being delighted by the home crowd, Tsagkarakis came up short in second place and twenty-fourth overall by just 0.13 of a second behind Lithuania's Rolandas Gimbutis in 24.72.

At the 2005 Mediterranean Games in Almería, Spain, Tsagkarakis helped out his Greek team (Apostolos Antonopoulos, Aristeidis Grigoriadis, and Andreas Zisimos) earned a bronze medal in the freestyle relay, posting a final time of 3:22.95.

Tsagkarakis qualified for the second time in the 50 m freestyle, as a 26-year-old, at the 2008 Summer Olympics in Beijing. He posted a FINA B-standard entry time of 22.39 from the Akropolis Grand Prix in Athens. He challenged seven other swimmers in heat ten, including four-time Olympian José Meolans of Argentina and 19-year-old Yoris Grandjean of Belgium. He raced again to second place by 0.18 of a second behind Slovenia's Jernej Godec in 22.39, matching his entry time in the process. Tsagkarakis failed to advance into the semifinals, as he placed twenty-sixth overall in the preliminaries.

== Life after swimming ==
Apart from his sporting career, Tsagkarakis worked for numerous institutions between Greece and the United States, where he became a full-time intern for clinical operations at the University of Alabama Medical Center. He also volunteered for medical mission activities, including the Hurricane Katrina Relief program, and Cystic Fibrosis Fund Raiser, a project which aimed to help and treat patients who had been afflicted with cystic fibrosis. In the late 2000s Tsagkarakis established and organized Masters Dream Camp in Athens, together with his friend Andrea di Nino, who coached and trained an elite group of butterfly swimmers including Olympic silver medalists Milorad Čavić and Yevgeny Korotyshkin.
