= Fencing at the 2005 Mediterranean Games =

The Fencing Competition at the 2005 Mediterranean Games was held in the Máximo Cuervo Sports Hall in Almería, Spain.

== Medallists ==
=== Men's competition ===
Individual Epée

Rank	Final
1st place, gold medalist(s)	Gauthier Grumier (FRA)
2nd place, silver medalist(s)	Jean-Michel Lucenay (FRA)
3rd place, bronze medalist(s)	Federico Bollati (ITA)
3rd place, bronze medalist(s)	José Luis Abajo (ESP)

Individual Foil

Rank	Final
1st place, gold medalist(s)	Marco Vannini (ITA)
2nd place, silver medalist(s)	Matteo Zennaro (ITA)
3rd place, bronze medalist(s)	Javier Menendez (ESP)
3rd place, bronze medalist(s)	Jean Noel Ferrari (FRA)

Individual Sabre

Rank	Final
1st place, gold medalist(s)	Aldo Montano (ITA)
2nd place, silver medalist(s)	Luigi Tarantino (ITA)
3rd place, bronze medalist(s)	Jorge Pérez Piña (ESP)
3rd place, bronze medalist(s)	Boris Sanson (FRA)

=== Women's competition ===
Individual Epée

Rank	Final
1st place, gold medalist(s)	Hajnalka Kiraly Picot (FRA)
2nd place, silver medalist(s)	Laura Flessel-Colovic (FRA)
3rd place, bronze medalist(s)	Veronica Rossi (ITA)
3rd place, bronze medalist(s)	Sara Cristina Cometti (ITA)

Individual Foil

Rank	Final
1st place, gold medalist(s)	Astrid Guyart (FRA)
2nd place, silver medalist(s)	Claudia Pigliapoco (ITA)
3rd place, bronze medalist(s)	Marta Simoncelli (ITA)
3rd place, bronze medalist(s)	Mélanie Moumas (FRA)

=== Medal table ===
Place	Nation	1st place, gold medalist(s)	2nd place, silver medalist(s)	3rd place, bronze medalist(s)	Total
1	France	3	2	3	8
2	Italy	2	3	4	9
3	Spain	0	0	3	3
Total		5	5	10	20
