= Volleyball at the 2005 Mediterranean Games =

The Volleyball Tournament at the 2005 Mediterranean Games was held in the Mediterranean Sports Palace and the Moisés Ruiz Sports Hall of the Diputación from Friday June 24 to Sunday July 3, 2005 in Almería, Spain.

== Medal summary ==
=== Events ===
Event	Gold	Silver	Bronze
Men	Egypt (EGY)	Spain (ESP)	Serbia and Montenegro (SCG)
Women	Turkey (TUR)	Greece (GRE)	Italy (ITA)

== Standings ==
=== Men's Competition ===
Rank	Team
1st place, gold medalist(s)	Egypt
2nd place, silver medalist(s)	Spain
3rd place, bronze medalist(s)	Serbia and Montenegro
4	Tunisia
5	Italy
6	France
7	Greece
8	Turkey
9	Croatia
10	Morocco
11	Albania
12	San Marino

=== Women's Competition ===
Rank	Team
1st place, gold medalist(s)	Turkey
2nd place, silver medalist(s)	Greece
3rd place, bronze medalist(s)	Italy
4	Croatia
5	Spain
6	France
7	Albania

== See also ==
- 2005 Women's European Volleyball Championship
