= Giannoulis =

Giannoulis is a name. People with the name include:

- Dimitris Giannoulis
- Giannis Giannoulis
- Ioannis Giannoulis
- Alexi Giannoulis
- Kostas Giannoulis
- Giannoulis Fakinos
- Giannoulis Larentzakis
- Giannoulis Chalepas

== See also ==
- Giannouli
