= Melquíades Álvarez =

Melquíades Álvarez may refer to:

- Melquíades Álvarez (politician) (1864–1936), Spanish Republican politician
- Melquíades Álvarez (swimmer) (born 1988), Spanish swimmer
