= Sébastien Bodet =

French swimmer (born 1985)

Personal information
- Born: 31 October 1985 (age 40) Dreux, France
- Height: 185 cm (6 ft 1 in)
- Weight: 80 kg (176 lb)

Sport
- Sport: Swimming
Medal record
Representing France
Summer Universiade
| Gold medal – first place | 2005 Izmir | 4x100m freestyle relay |
Mediterranean Games
| Silver medal – second place | 2009 Pescara | 4x200m freestyle relay |

Sébastien Bodet (born 31 October 1985) is a French swimmer who competed in the 2008 Summer Olympics.
