= Matthieu Madelaine =

French swimmer

Personal information
- Born: 24 November 1983 (age 42) Baugé, Baugé-en-Anjou, Maine-et-Loire, France
- Height: 193 cm (6 ft 4 in)
- Weight: 90 kg (198 lb)

Sport
- Sport: Swimming
- Club: CN Antibes
Medal record
Representing France
Summer Universiade
Gold medal – first place	2005 Izmir	4x100m freestyle relay
Mediterranean Games
Bronze medal – third place	2005 Almeria	4x200m freestyle relay

Matthieu Madelaine (born 24 November 1983) is a French freestyle swimmer who competed in the 2008 Summer Olympics.
