= David Ortega (swimmer) =

Spanish swimmer (born 1979)

Personal information
- Full name: David Ortega Pitarch
- Born: 20 July 1979 (age 46) Castellón de la Plana, Castellón, Spain
Medal record
Men's swimming
Representing Spain
European Championships
Gold medal – first place	2000 Helsinki	100 m backstroke
Bronze medal – third place	2000 Helsinki	50 m backstroke
Bronze medal – third place	2004 Madrid	50 m backstroke
Mediterranean Games
Silver medal – second place	2005 Almería	50 m backstroke
Silver medal – second place	2005 Almería	4×100 m medley relay
Bronze medal – third place	2005 Almería	100 m backstroke

David Ortega Pitarch (born 20 July 1979 in Castellón de la Plana, Castellón) is a freestyle and backstroke swimmer from Spain. He swam for Spain at the 2000 Summer Olympics; the World Championships in 1998, 2003, 2005, and 2007; the Mediterranean Games in 2001 and 2005; and the European Championships in 2000 and 2004.

At the 2000 European Championships, he won the 100m Backstroke.
