= Noemí Feliz =

Spanish swimmer (born 1988)

Noemi Féliz
Personal information
- Full name: Noemi Féliz García
- Nationality: Spain
- Born: 27 September 1988 (age 37) Ponferrada, León, Spain
- Height: 1.70 m (5 ft 7 in)
- Weight: 62 kg (137 lb)

Sport
- Sport: Swimming
- Event: Freestyle
- Club: Club Natación Ponferrada

Noemi Féliz García (born September 27, 1988) is a Spanish swimmer, who specialized in freestyle events. Feliz represented Spain at the 2008 Summer Olympics in Beijing, where she competed for the women's 4 × 200 m freestyle relay, along with her fellow swimmers María Fuster, Melania Costa, and Arantxa Ramos. She swam on the third leg, with an individual-split time of 1:59.77, finishing seventh in the first heat and fourteenth overall to her team, for a total time of 8:00.90.
