= Rowing at the 2005 Mediterranean Games =

Rowing competition

- Venue: Canal de Cuevas de Almanzora
- Location: Almería, Spain
- Dates: 30 June – 2 July 2005

The Rowing Competition at the 2005 Mediterranean Games was held in the Cuevas del Almanzora Canal in Almería, Spain from 30 June to 2 July 2005.

== Medalists ==
=== Men's events ===
Event	Gold	Silver	Bronze
Single sculls	Simone Raineri (ITA)	Nikola Stojić (SCG)	Davor Mizerit (SLO)
Lightweight single sculls	Fabrice Moreau (FRA)	Mete Yeltepe (TUR)	Lorenzo Bertini (ITA)
Coxless pairs	Italy (ITA); Luca Agamennoni; Dario Lari	Greece (GRE); Ioannis Christou; Nikolaos Pagounis	Egypt (EGY); Mohamed Gomaa; El Bakry Yehia
Lightweight coxless pairs	France (FRA); Jean-Christophe Bette; Franck Solforosi	Italy (ITA); Catello Amarante; Salvatore Amitrano	Turkey (TUR); İhsan Emre Vural; Ahmet Yumrukaya
Double sculls	Italy (ITA); Alessio Sartori; Matteo Stefanini	Turkey (TUR); Saim Kaya; Sami Kaya	Slovenia (SLO); Rok Kolander; Matej Prelog
Lightweight double sculls	Greece (GRE); Vasileios Polymeros; Nikolaos Skiathitis	France (FRA); Frédéric Dufour; Arnaud Pornin	Italy (ITA); Leonardo Pettinari; Nicola Moriconi

=== Women's events ===
Event	Gold	Silver	Bronze
Single sculls	Elisabetta Sancassani (ITA)	Caroline Delas (FRA)	Nuria Domínguez (ESP)
Lightweight single sculls	Mirna Rajle (CRO)	Chrysi Biskitzi (GRE)	Teresa Mas (ESP)

== Medal table ==
Rank	Nation	Gold	Silver	Bronze	Total
1	Italy (ITA)	4	1	2	7
2	France (FRA)	2	2	0	4
3	Greece (GRE)	1	2	0	3
4	Croatia (CRO)	1	0	0	1
5	Turkey (TUR)	0	2	1	3
6	Serbia and Montenegro (SCG)	0	1	0	1
7	Slovenia (SLO)	0	0	2	2
7	Spain (ESP)	0	0	2	2
9	Egypt (EGY)	0	0	1	1
Totals (9 entries)		8	8	8	24
