= Luis Pedro Suela =

Spanish volleyball player (born 1976)

Personal information
- Born: July 7, 1976 (age 49)
Medal record
Men's volleyball
Representing Spain
Mediterranean Games
Silver medal – second place	2005 Almería	Team competition

Luis Pedro Suela Méndez (born July 7, 1976 in Madrid) is a Spanish volleyball player who represented his native country at the 2000 Summer Olympics in Sydney, Australia. There he finished in the ninth place with the Men's national team. He is currently plays for CAI Voleibol Teruel in Spain.
