= Mireia García =

Spanish swimmer (born 1981)

Medal record

Women's swimming

Representing Spain

European Championships
Bronze medal – third place	2000 Helsinki	200 m butterfly

Mediterranean Games
Gold medal – first place	2001 Tunis	200 m butterfly
Silver medal – second place	2005 Almería	100 m butterfly
Silver medal – second place	2005 Almería	200 m butterfly
Silver medal – second place	2005 Almería	4×100 m medley

Mireia García Sánchez (born 31 July 1981 in Viladecans, Catalonia) is a former butterfly swimmer from Spain, who competed for her native country at 2000 Summer Olympics in Sydney, Australia. Prior to that tournament she won the bronze medal in the women's 200 m butterfly at the 2000 European Aquatics Championships in Helsinki, Finland.
