= Ioannis Giannoulis =

Greek swimmer (born 1988)

Personal information
- Born: January 8, 1988 (age 38) Thessaloniki, Greece

Sport
- Sport: Swimming
Medal record
Representing Greece
Mediterranean Games
Bronze medal – third place	2009 Pescara	4x200m freestyle relay

Ioannis Giannoulis (born January 8, 1988, in Thessaloniki, Greece) is a Greek Olympic swimmer. He swam for Greece at the 2008 Olympics.
