= Caroline Delas =

French rower

Personal information
- Born: 27 February 1980 (age 46) Langon, Gironde
Medal record
Women's rowing
Representing France
Mediterranean Games
Silver medal – second place	2005 Almería	Single sculls

Caroline Delas (born 27 February 1980 in Langon, Gironde) is a female competition rower from France. A silver medal winner at the 2005 Mediterranean Games she represented her native country at the 2004 Summer Olympics in Athens, Greece.
