= Alessandro Calvi =

Italian swimmer (born 1983)

Medal record

Men's swimming

Representing Italy

World Championships (LC)
Silver medal – second place	2007 Melbourne	4×100 m freestyle

World Championships (SC)
Gold medal – first place	2006 Shanghai	4×100 m freestyle

European Championships (LC)
Gold medal – first place	2006 Budapest	4×100 m freestyle
Silver medal – second place	2008 Eindhoven	4×100 m freestyle

Summer Universiade
Gold medal – first place	2005 Izmir	4×200 m freestyle
Bronze medal – third place	2005 Izmir	100 m freestyle

Alessandro Calvi (born 1 February 1983) is a freestyle swimmer from Voghera, Italy, who was a member of team that won the silver medal in the men's 4×100 metres freestyle relay at the 2007 World Championships. He represented his native country at the 2004 Summer Olympics in Athens, Greece.
