= Emil Tahirovič =

Slovenian swimmer (born 1979)

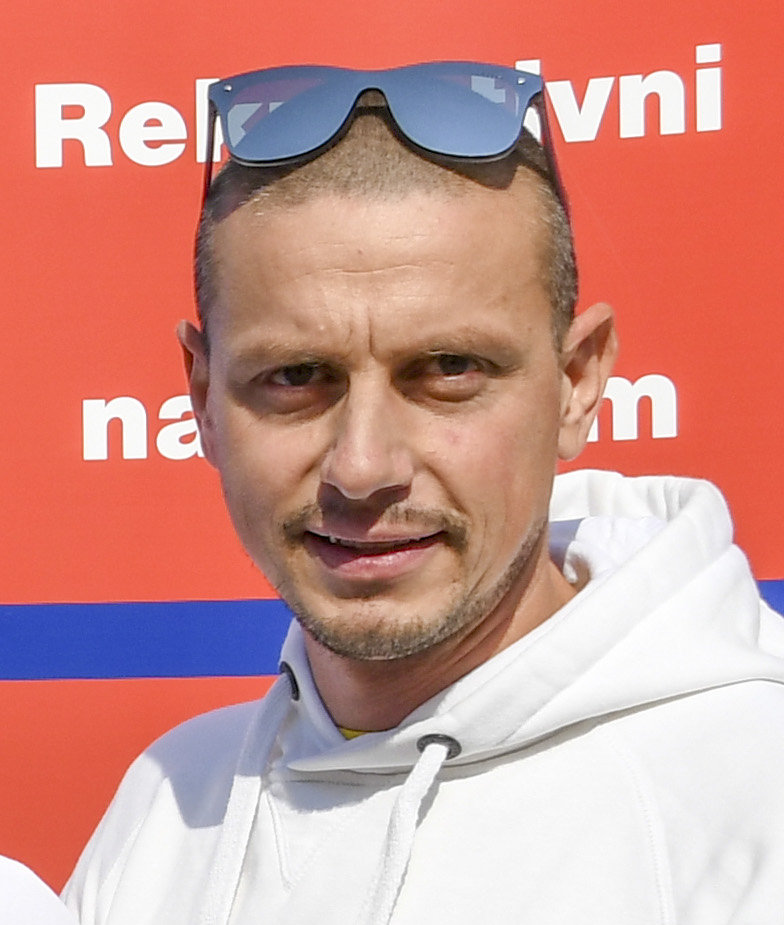
- Emil Tahirovič in 2018

Personal information
- Full name: Emil Tahirovič
- Nationality: Slovenia
- Born: December 30, 1979 (age 46) near Ivančna Gorica, Yugoslavia
- Height: 1.80 m (5 ft 11 in)
- Weight: 82 kg (181 lb)

Sport
- Sport: Swimming
- Strokes: Breaststroke
- Club: Plavalni Klub Triglav Kranj
Medal record
European Championships (SC)
Bronze medal – third place	2004 Vienna	50 m breaststroke
Bronze medal – third place	2008 Rijeka	50 m breaststroke
Mediterranean Games
Gold medal – first place	2005 Almería	50m breast
Gold medal – first place	2005 Almería	4×100m Medley Relay
Bronze medal – third place	2005 Almería	100m breast
Silver medal – second place	2009 Pescara	50m breast

Emil Tahirovič (born December 30, 1979, near Ivančna Gorica, Yugoslavia) is an Olympic breaststroke swimmer from Slovenia. He swam for Slovenia at the 2004 Olympics.

He swam for Slovenia at:

- Olympics: 2004
- Mediterranean Games: 2005, 2009
- World Championships: 2003, 2005, 2007, 2009
- European Championships: 2004
- European SC Championships: 1998, 2003, 2004, 2005, 2006, 2008, 2010
