= Melquíades Álvarez (swimmer) =

Spanish swimmer (born 1988)

Personal information
- Full name: Melquíades Javier Álvarez Caraballo
- Born: 10 August 1988 (age 37) Seville, Spain

Sport
- Sport: Swimming
- Strokes: Breaststroke
Medal record
Men's swimming
Representing Spain
European Championships (SC)
Silver medal – second place	2010 Eindhoven	200 m breaststroke
Mediterranean Games
Gold medal – first place	2009 Pescara	100 m breaststroke
Gold medal – first place	2009 Pescara	200 m breaststroke
Gold medal – first place	2009 Pescara	4×100 m medley

Melquíades Javier Álvarez Caraballo (born 10 August 1988) is a Spanish swimmer who competed in the 2008 Summer Olympics.
