= Romain Barnier =

French swimmer (born 1976)

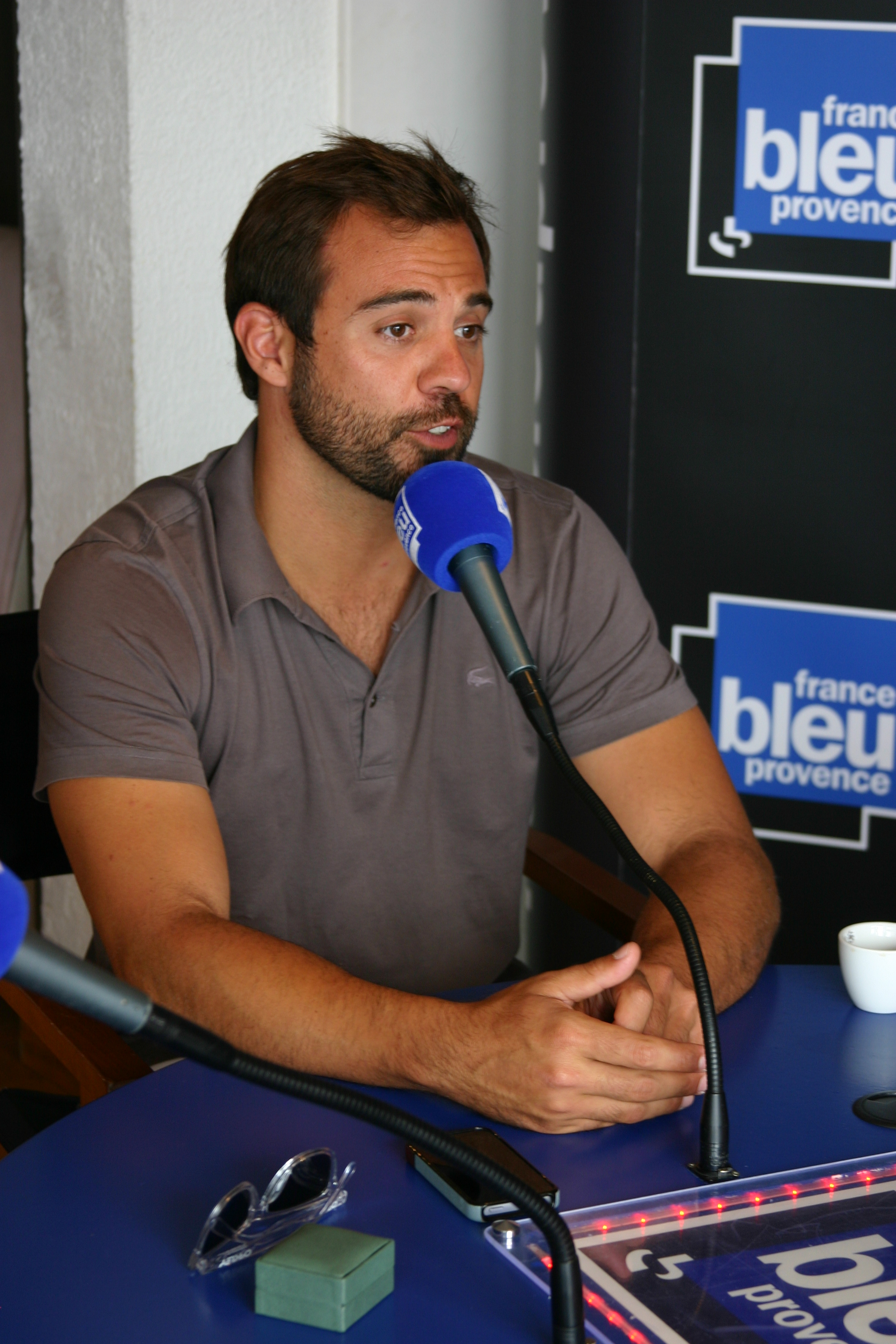

Personal information
- Full name: Romain Barnier
- Nationality: France
- Born: 10 May 1976 (age 50) Marseille, France

Sport
- Sport: Swimming
- Strokes: Freestyle
- College team: Auburn Tigers
Medal record
World Championships (LC)
Bronze medal – third place	2003 Barcelona	4×100 m freestyle
European LC Championships
Silver medal – second place	2002 Berlin	4×100 m medley
Bronze medal – third place	2000 Helsinki	4×100 m freestyle
European Championships (SC)
Gold medal – first place	2004 Vienna	4×50 m freestyle
Bronze medal – third place	2001 Antwerp	100 m freestyle
Summer Universiade
Gold medal – first place	2001 Beijing	100 m freestyle
Mediterranean Games
Gold medal – first place	2005 Almería	4×100 m freestyle
Bronze medal – third place	2005 Almería	100 m butterfly

Romain Barnier (born 10 May 1976 in Marseille) is a former freestyle swimmer from France, who won the bronze medal in the 100 m freestyle at the European Short Course Swimming Championships 2001. He competed in two consecutive Summer Olympics for his native country, starting in 2000.

After retiring from competitive swimming, he is the head swimming coach of the elite group of the Cercle des Nageurs de Marseille.

In 2017, Barnier was given a six-month suspension for anti-doping rules violations.
