= Nicola Moriconi =

Italian rower (born 1982)

Personal information
- Born: 19 May 1982 (age 44)

Sport
- Sport: Rowing
Medal record
Men's rowing
Representing Italy
World Rowing Championships
Gold medal – first place	2002 Seville	Lwt eight
Gold medal – first place	2005 Kaizu, Gifu	Lwt eight
Silver medal – second place	2004 Banyoles	Lwt pair
Bronze medal – third place	2007 Munich	Lwt eight
Mediterranean Games
Bronze medal – third place	2005 Almería	Lwt double scull

Nicola Moriconi (born 19 May 1982) is an Italian lightweight rower. He won a gold medal at the 2002 World Rowing Championships in Seville with the lightweight men's eight.
