= Aleksandra Putra =

Polish competitive swimmer (born 1986)

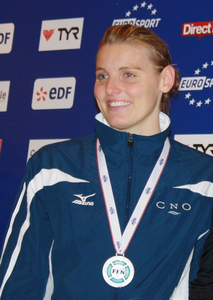

Personal information
- Full name: Aleksandra Putra
- National team: France; Poland
- Born: 20 September 1986 (age 40) Olsztyn, Warmińsko-Mazurskie, Poland
- Height: 65 kg
- Weight: 1.81 m

Sport
- Sport: Swimming
- Strokes: Freestyle
- Club: Dauphins du Toulouse OEC
- College team: University of Georgia (U.S.)
Medal record
Women's swimming
Representing France
Mediterranean Games
Gold medal – first place	2005 Almería	100 m backstroke
Gold medal – first place	2005 Almería	4x100 m medley
Bronze medal – third place	2005 Almería	200 m backstroke
European Championships (SC)
Gold medal – first place	2008 Rijeka	200m backstroke

Aleksandra (Alexandra) Putra (born 20 September 1986) is a Polish competitive swimmer. As a member of the Polish women's team, she competed in the 4×200-metre freestyle relay at the 2012 Summer Olympics in London. She previously competed for France at the 2004 Summer Olympics in Athens. She swam for France at the 2008 European Short Course Championships, and won the 200m backstroke.
