= Sophie Huber =

French swimmer (born 1985)

Personal information
- Nationality: France
- Born: 26 November 1985 (age 40) Forbach, Moselle, France
- Height: 1.74 m (5 ft 9 in)
- Weight: 63 kg (139 lb)

Sport
- Sport: Swimming
- Strokes: Freestyle
- Club: A Jövő SC
Medal record
World Championships (LC)
Bronze medal – third place	2007 Melbourne	4×200 m freestyle
European Championships (LC)
Bronze medal – third place	2006 Budapest	4×200 m freestyle
Mediterranean Games
Gold medal – first place	2005 Almería	4×100 m freestyle
Bronze medal – third place	2005 Almería	800 m freestyle
Universiade
Bronze medal – third place	2005 Izmir	4×200 m freestyle

Sophie Huber (born 26 November 1985 in Forbach, France) is an Olympic swimmer from France. She swam for France at the 2008 Olympics.

She also swam for France at:

- World Championships: 2005, 2007, 2009
- European Championships: 2006
- Mediterranean Games: 2005, 2009
- World University Games: 2005
