= Matteo Stefanini =

Italian rower (born 1984)

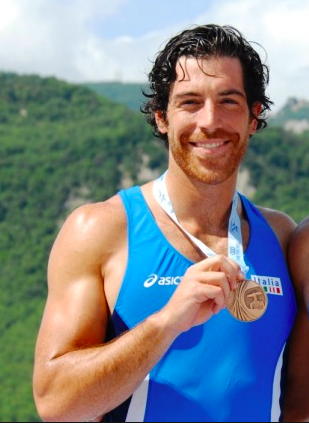
- Stefanini in 2018

Personal information
- National team: Italy
- Born: 29 April 1984 (age 42) Pisa, Italy
- Height: 1.90 m (6 ft 3 in)
- Weight: 91 kg (201 lb)

Sport
- Sport: Rowing
- Club: San Miniato
- Start activity: 1995
Medal record
Men's rowing
World Rowing Championships
Silver medal – second place	2010 Karapiro	Quadruple sculls
European Championships
Bronze medal – third place	2013 Seville	Quadruple sculls
Mediterranean Games
Gold medal – first place	2005 Almería	Double Sculls

Matteo Stefanini (born 29 April 1984) is a rower from Italy.

He competed for his native country at the 2004 Summer Olympics in Athens in the single sculls, and won the gold medal in the men's double sculls event at the 2005 Mediterranean Games alongside Alessio Sartori. At the 2010 World Championships, he finished second in the men's quadruple sculls. At the 2012 Summer Olympics, he competed in the quadruple sculls.
