= Samuel Pizzetti =

Italian swimmer

Personal information
- Full name: Samuel Pizzetti
- Nickname: Il barracuda milanese
- Nationality: Italy
- Born: 16 October 1986 (age 39) Codogno, Italy

Sport
- Sport: Swimming
- Strokes: Freestyle
Medal record
European Championships (LC)
Silver medal – second place	2008 Eindhoven	800 m freestyle
Silver medal – second place	2012 Debrecen	4x200 m freestyle
Bronze medal – third place	2010 Budapest	800 m freestyle
Bronze medal – third place	2010 Budapest	1500 m freestyle
Bronze medal – third place	2012 Debrecen	400 m freestyle
European Championships (SC)
Bronze medal – third place	2008 Rijeka	1500 m freestyle
Mediterranean Games
Silver medal – second place	2009 Pescara	400 m freestyle
Bronze medal – third place	2005 Almería	1500 m freestyle

Samuel Pizzetti (born 16 October 1986) is an Italian freestyle swimmer from Codogno. He swam at two Olympics; the 1500 m in 2008 and the 400 m in 2012.
