= Angeliki Exarchou =

Greek swimmer (born 1985)

Personal information
- Full name: Angeliki Exarchou
- National team: Greece
- Born: 19 August 1985 (age 40) Trikala, Greece
- Height: 1.77 m (5 ft 10 in)
- Weight: 64 kg (141 lb)

Sport
- Sport: Swimming
- Strokes: Breaststroke
- Club: Olympiakos Athina
Medal record
Women's swimming
Representing Greece
Mediterranean Games
Silver medal – second place	2009 Pescara	100 m breaststroke
Bronze medal – third place	2005 Almería	100 m breaststroke
Bronze medal – third place	2009 Pescara	200 m breaststroke
Bronze medal – third place	2009 Pescara	4×100 m medley

Angeliki Exarchou (Greek: Αγγελική Εξάρχου; born August 19, 1985) is a Greek former swimmer, who specialized in breaststroke events. She represented her nation Greece at the 2008 Summer Olympics, and had also collected a total of four medals (one silver and three bronze) in an international competition, spanning two editions of the Mediterranean Games (2005 and 2009). Exarchou also dipped under a 1:10 barrier to set a Greek record of 1:08.99 in the 100 m breaststroke at the 2009 Mediterranean Games in Pescara, Italy.

Exarchou competed as part of the Greek squad in a breaststroke double at the 2008 Summer Olympics in Beijing. Leading up to the Games, she cleared FINA B-standard entry times of 1:09.35 (100 m breaststroke) and 2:30.05 (200 m breaststroke) at the 2007 Summer Universiade in Bangkok, Thailand. In the 100 m breaststroke, Exarchou raced her steady stretch to sixth place and thirtieth overall by two hundredths of a second (0.02) behind Turkey's Dilara Buse Günaydın in 1:10.47. Three days later, in the 200 m breaststroke, Exarchou closed out the field in heat three to last and thirty-ninth overall by nearly ten seconds behind Belarus' two-time Olympian Inna Kapishina in 2:36.83. failing to advance to the semifinals.
