= Anne-Sophie Le Paranthoën =

French swimmer

Personal information
- Nationality: France
- Born: 24 February 1977 (age 49) Tokyo, Japan

Sport
- Sport: Swimming
- Strokes: Breaststroke
- Club: CN Marseille
Medal record
Mediterranean Games
| Gold medal – first place | Almería 2005 | 100m Breaststroke |
| Gold medal – first place | Almería 2005 | 4x100m Medley Relay |
European Championships
| Bronze medal – third place | Budapest 2006 | 4x100m Medley Relay |
Short Course Europeans (25m)
| Bronze medal – third place | Debrecen 2007 | 4x50m Medley Relay |

Anne-Sophie Le Paranthoën (born 24 February 1977 in Tokyo, Japan) is an international-level swimmer from France. At the 2007 World Championships she set a French Record in the 100m Breaststroke (1:08.68).

As of July 2009, she still holds the French Record in the short-course 50 breaststroke (31.49).
