= Klemen Ferjan =

Slovenian judoka

Personal information
- Born: 12 October 1979 (age 47)
- Occupation: Judoka

Sport
- Country: Slovenia
- Sport: Judo
- Weight class: –81 kg

Achievements and titles
- World Champ.: 9th (2003)
- European Champ.: 5th (2007)
Medal record
Men's judo
Representing Slovenia
World Juniors Championships
Bronze medal – third place	1998 Cali	–73 kg

Profile at external databases
- IJF: 2422
- JudoInside.com: 609
- Updated on 10 January 2023

Klemen Ferjan (born 12 October 1979) is a former Slovenian judoka.

Currently he is building up a career in aviation. Klemen has served nearly 3 years as the Alternate Representative on the Council of the International Civil Aviation Organization (ICAO). He has been representing Central European Rotation Group (CERG) in providing continuing direction to ICAO’s work of fostering safe, secure and sustainable international aviation, including with respect to the review and adoption of international standards and recommended practices. His area of special interest is economic development of air transport; hence as IATA Consultant he revived Airline Operational Cost Task Force (currently Airline Cost Management Group) in 2012 and significantly increased airlines’ participation in 2013 and 2014.

Klemen holds an M.B.A. degree from the John Molson School of Business at Concordia University and Diploma in Civil Aviation Management. He also serves on the board of directors of Fondation Amal, mentors young budding entrepreneurs and is an avid judo instructor.

== Achievements ==
Year	Tournament	Place	Weight class
2007	European Judo Championships	5th	Half middleweight (81 kg)
2005	Mediterranean Games	2nd	Half middleweight (81 kg)
1998	World Junior Championships	3rd	Half middleweight (73 kg)
