= Romanos Alyfantis =

Greek swimmer (born 1986)

Personal information
- Full name: Romanos Iasonas Alyfantis
- Nationality: Greece
- Born: 21 March 1986 (age 40)
- Height: 1.83 m (6 ft 0 in)

Sport
- Sport: Swimming
Medal record
European Championships (SC)
Silver medal – second place	2005 Trieste	100 m breaststroke
Mediterranean Games
Silver medal – second place	2005 Almería	100 m breaststroke
Silver medal – second place	2009 Pescara	200 m medley
Silver medal – second place	2009 Pescara	4×100 m medley
Bronze medal – third place	2009 Pescara	200 m breaststroke

Romanos Iasonas Alyfantis (Greek: Ρωμανός Αλυφαντής; born 21 March 1986) is a breaststroke swimmer from Greece. He won a silver medal at the 2005 Mediterranean Games, and represented his native country at the 2004 and 2008 Olympics.
