= Dario Lari =

Italian rower

Personal information
- Born: 22 October 1979 (age 46) Livorno, Italy
Medal record
Men's rowing
Representing Italy
World Championships
Bronze medal – third place	2005 Gifu	Coxless pair
Mediterranean Games
Gold medal – first place	2005 Almería	Coxless pair

Dario Lari (born 22 October 1979 in Livorno) is a rower from Italy. He competed for his native country at the 2004 Summer Olympics in Athens.
