= Javier Tarantino =

Spanish footballer

Personal information
- Full name: Francisco Javier Tarantino Uriarte
- Date of birth: 26 June 1984 (age 42)
- Place of birth: Bermeo, Spain
- Height: 1.82 m (5 ft 11 1/2 in)
- Position: Left-back

Youth career
- 1995–1996: Bermeo
- 1996–2002: Athletic Bilbao

Senior career*
| Years | Team | Apps | (Gls) |
| 2002–2003 | Basconia | 28 | (2) |
| 2003–2004 | Bilbao Athletic | 38 | (1) |
| 2004–2006 | Athletic Bilbao | 3 | (0) |
| 2005 | → Numancia (loan) | 15 | (1) |
| 2006 | → Numancia (loan) | 14 | (0) |
| 2006–2007 | Numancia | 22 | (0) |
| 2007–2008 | Alavés | 22 | (0) |
| 2008–2011 | Albacete | 84 | (3) |
| 2011–2013 | Tenerife | 63 | (0) |
| 2013–2015 | Cartagena | 44 | (2) |
| 2015–2017 | Sestao | 38 | (0) |
| 2017–2019 | Bermeo | 5 | (0) |
| Total | | 376 | (9) |

International career
| 2000–2001 | Spain U16 | 10 | (0) |
| 2001 | Spain U17 | 4 | (0) |
| 2002–2003 | Spain U19 | 2 | (0) |
| 2005–2006 | Spain U21 | 2 | (0) |
| 2005 | Spain U23 | 4 | (0) |
Medal record
Men's Football
Representing Spain
UEFA European Under-16 Championship
| Winner | 2001 England |
- * Club domestic league appearances and goals

Francisco Javier Tarantino Uriarte (born 26 June 1984) is a Spanish former professional footballer who played as a left-back.

He amassed Segunda División totals of 142 games and three goals over six seasons, with Numancia, Alavés and Albacete. In La Liga, he appeared for Athletic Bilbao and Numancia.

== Club career ==
Born in Bermeo, Biscay, Tarantino joined Athletic Bilbao's youth system in 1996, aged 12. He then proceeded to move up the ranks, appearing for the farm team in the Tercera División and the reserves in the Segunda División B.

Tarantino was loaned to CD Numancia midway through 2004–05, making his La Liga debut with that club. His first match in the competition occurred on 30 January 2005, playing the full 90 minutes in a 1–2 home loss against Real Madrid; at the end of the season – where he scored once in another home defeat, this time against Racing de Santander (3–2)– his team was relegated.

Tarantino returned to Athletic for the 2005–06 campaign. He was sent off twice in only three games, and eventually was again loaned to Numancia, with the Soria side now in the Segunda División where he spent the following five years, also representing Deportivo Alavés and Albacete Balompié.

From 2011 onwards, Tarantino took his game to the third tier, starting with CD Tenerife.

== Honours ==
Spain U16

- UEFA European Under-16 Championship: 2001

Spain U23

- Mediterranean Games: 2005
