= Sergio Torres (footballer, born 1984) =

Spanish footballer

Personal information
- Full name: Sergio Torres Guardeño
- Date of birth: 2 March 1984 (age 42)
- Place of birth: Córdoba, Spain
- Height: 1.72 m (5 ft 7 1/2 in)
- Position: Midfielder

Youth career
- Córdoba
- 1998–2002: Atlético Madrid

Senior career*
| Years | Team | Apps | (Gls) |
| 2002–2005 | Atlético B | 86 | (7) |
| 2005–2006 | Atlético Madrid | 0 | (0) |
| 2005–2006 | → Ciudad Murcia (loan) | 22 | (0) |
| 2006–2007 | Tenerife | 12 | (0) |
| 2007 | Portuense | 8 | (0) |
| 2008 | Zamora | 19 | (0) |
| 2008–2009 | Badalona | 11 | (0) |
| 2010 | Caravaca | 10 | (0) |
| 2010–2014 | Burgos | 119 | (3) |
| 2014–2015 | Lucena | 37 | (2) |
| 2015–2016 | Ciudad Lucena | 33 | (6) |
| 2016 | Martos | 9 | (0) |
| 2016–2017 | Ciudad Lucena | 20 | (1) |
| 2017–2018 | Atlético Mancha Real | 20 | (2) |
| Total | | 406 | (21) |

International career
| 2001 | Spain U16 | 7 | (0) |
| 2001 | Spain U17 | 3 | (0) |
| 2002–2003 | Spain U19 | 5 | (0) |
| 2003 | Spain U20 | 3 | (1) |
| 2005 | Spain U23 | 5 | (0) |
Medal record
Men's Football
Representing Spain
UEFA European Under-16 Championship
| Winner | 2001 England |
- * Club domestic league appearances and goals

Sergio Torres Guardeño (born 2 March 1984) is a Spanish former footballer who played as a midfielder.

== Club career ==
During his senior career, all but spent in the lower leagues, Torres represented Atlético Madrid B – he played three years with the Colchoneros' reserves, in Segunda División B – Ciudad de Murcia, CD Tenerife, Racing Club Portuense, Zamora CF, CF Badalona, Caravaca CF, Burgos CF, Lucena CF, CD Ciudad de Lucena (two spells), Martos CD and Atlético Mancha Real.

At the professional level, Torres' input consisted of 34 matches (no goals) in Segunda División, during two seasons. He made his debut in the competition on 4 September 2005 whilst at the service of Ciudad de Murcia, starting in a 1–0 away win against Atlético Malagueño.

== Honours ==
Spain U16

- UEFA European Under-16 Championship: 2001

Spain U19

- UEFA European Under-19 Championship: 2002

Spain U23

- Mediterranean Games: 2005
