= Przemysław Stańczyk =

Polish swimmer

Personal information
- Full name: Przemysław Stańczyk
- Nationality: Poland
- Born: 12 February 1985 (age 41) Szczecin, Poland
- Height: 1.85 m (6 ft 1 in)
- Weight: 80 kg (176 lb)

Sport
- Sport: Swimming
- Strokes: Freestyle
Medal record
Men's swimming
Representing Poland
World Championships (LC)
Gold medal – first place	2007 Melbourne	800 m freestyle
European Championships (SC)
Silver medal – second place	2006 Helsinki	400 m freestyle
Summer Universiade
Gold medal – first place	2005 Izmir	800 m freestyle
Gold medal – first place	2009 Belgrade	400 m freestyle
Gold medal – first place	2009 Belgrade	1500 m freestyle
Bronze medal – third place	2009 Belgrade	800 m freestyle

Przemysław Stańczyk (born 12 February 1985 in Szczecin) is an Olympic and national record holding swimmer from Poland. He has swum for Poland at the:

- Olympics: 2004, 2008
- World Championships: 2003, 2005, 2007
- World University Games: 2005, 2009
