= Natalia Vía Dufresne =

Spanish sailor

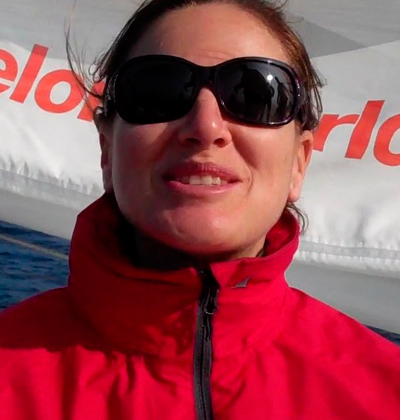
- Natalia Vía Dufresne in 2011

Personal information
- Full name: Natalia Vía Dufresne Pereña
- Born: 10 June 1973 (age 53) Barcelona, Spain

Sailing career
- Sport: Sailing
Medal record
Women's sailing
Representing Spain
Olympic Games
Silver medal – second place	1992 Barcelona	Europe class
Silver medal – second place	2004 Athens	470 class
Summer Universiade
Gold medal – first place	1999 Palma de Mallorca	470 class
Mediterranean Games
Silver medal – second place	2005 Almeria	470 class
Bronze medal – third place	1997 Bari	470 class

Natalia Vía Dufresne Pereña (Note: In this Spanish name, the first or paternal surname is Vía Dufresne and the second or maternal family name is Pereña.) (born 10 June 1973) is a Spanish sport sailor.

She was born in Barcelona. She was originally an Optimist sailor, but switched to 470’s at the age of 15. She won two bronze medals in the World Championships, two Olympic silver medals (in 1992 and in 2004), with crew member, Sandra Azón. Her current crew is Laia Tutzó.

Her sister is Begoña Vía Dufresne.
