= Apostolos Antonopoulos =

Greek swimmer (born 1983)

Personal information
- Full name: Apostolos Antonopoulos
- National team: Greece
- Born: 7 June 1983 (age 43) Athens, Greece
- Height: 1.91 m (6 ft 3 in)
- Weight: 86 kg (190 lb)

Sport
- Sport: Swimming
- Strokes: Freestyle
- Club: NGS Artemis
Medal record
Men's swimming
Representing Greece
Mediterranean Games
Silver medal – second place	2005 Almería	4×200 m freestyle
Bronze medal – third place	2005 Almería	4×100 m freestyle

Apostolos Antonopoulos (Greek: Απόστολος Αντωνόπουλος; born 7 June 1983) is a Greek former swimmer, who specialized in freestyle events. He won a total of two medals, silver and bronze, in the 400 and 800 m freestyle relays at the 2005 Mediterranean Games in Almería, Spain.

Antonopoulos qualified for the men's 4 × 200 m freestyle relay, as a member of the host nation team, at the 2004 Summer Olympics in Athens. Teaming with Nikolaos Xylouris, Andreas Zisimos, and Dimitrios Manganas, Antonopoulos swam a lead-off leg in a split of 1:50.34, but the Greeks rounded out the finale to last place with a final time of 7:23.02, more than 15 seconds off the winning mark set by Team USA.
