= Swimming at the 2005 Summer Universiade =

Swimming at the XXIII Summer Universiade
- Venues: Manisa Özel Ýdare Swimming Complex
- Dates: 12 August 2005 – 17 August 2005

The swimming competition during the 2005 Summer Universiade, also known as the XXIV Summer Universiade, took place in the Manisa Özel Ýdare Swimming Complex in İzmir, Turkey from August 12 until August 17, 2005. The swimming competition is one of the fourteen sports of the 23rd Universiade 2005.

== Men's events ==
Event	Gold		Silver		Bronze	
50 m freestyle	Cullen Jones; USA	22.22	Andrey Kapralov; Russia	22.40	Nicholas Santos; Brazil	22.44
100 m freestyle	Evgeny Lagunov; Russia	49.52	Andrey Kapralov; Russia	49.70	Alessandro Calvi; Italy	49.90
200 m freestyle	Yuri Prilukov; Russia	1:49.12	Ross Davenport (United Kingdom) Great Britain	1:49.16	Markus Rogan; Austria	1:50.47
400 m freestyle	Yuri Prilukov; Russia	3:49.85	Justin Mortimer; USA	3:50.52	Takeshi Matsuda (Japan)	3:51.91
800 m freestyle	Przemysław Stańczyk; Poland	7:57.00	Yuri Prilukov; Russia	7:57.05	Takeshi Matsuda (Japan)	7:58.82
1500 m freestyle	Justin Mortimer; USA	15:23.74	Thomas Lurz (Germany)	15:26.20	Igor Chervynskyi; Ukraine	15:26.70
50 m backstroke	Liam Tancock (United Kingdom) Great Britain	25.50	Sung Min (South Korea) Korea	25.59	Masafumi Yamaguchi (Japan); Matt Grevers; USA	25.61
100 m backstroke	Masafumi Yamaguchi (Japan)	55.00	Matt Grevers; USA	55.08	Junichi Miyashita (Japan)	55.81
200 m backstroke	Blaž Medvešek; Slovenia	1:58.91	Takashi Nakano (Japan)	1:59.09	Masafumi Yamaguchi (Japan)	2:00.76
50 m breaststroke	Oleg Lisogor; Ukraine	27.63	Valeriy Dymo; Ukraine	28.27	Scott Dickens; Canada	28.27
100 m breaststroke	Oleg Lisogor; Ukraine	1:00.73	Kevin Swander; USA	1:01.74	Makoto Yamashita (Japan)	1:01.69
200 m breaststroke	Sławomir Kuczko; Poland	2:12.35	Vladislav Polyakov; Kazakhstan	2:12.69	Genki Imamura (Japan)	2:12.95
50 m butterfly	Sergiy Breus; Ukraine	23.63	Yevgeni Korotyshkin; Russia	23.69	Nicholas Santos; Brazil	23.98
100 m butterfly	Sergiy Breus; Ukraine	53.37	Todd Cooper (United Kingdom) Great Britain	53.41	Sergiy Advena; Ukraine	53.42
200 m butterfly	Paweł Korzeniowski (Poland) Polan	1:56.52	Takeshi Matsuda (Japan)	1:57.55	Lukasz Drzewinski; Poland	1:58.13
200 m individual medley	Eric Shanteau; USA	2:00.13	Vytautas Janušaitis; Lithuania	2:00.98	Zhao Tao (China)	2:01.29
400 m individual medley	Eric Shanteau; USA	4:18.64	Peter Nagy; Hungary	4:20.05	Hidemasa Sano (Japan)	4:20.11
4 × 100 m freestyle relay	France (FRA); Antoine Galavtine; Sébastien Bodet; Matthiev Madelaine; Alain Bernard	3:19.91	Great Britain (GBR); Chris Cozens; Todd Cooper; Alex Scotcher; Ross Davenport	3:20.27	United States (USA); Terrence Silkaitis; Ryan Verlatti; Kyle Ransom; Matt Grevers	3:20.45
4 × 200 m freestyle relay	Italy (ITA); Andrea Frovi; Alessandro Calvi; Luca Pasteris; Nicola Cassio	7:19.51	Japan (JPN); Yoshihiro Okumura; Daisuke Hosokawa; Hisayoshi Sato; Takeshi Matsuda	7:20.31	United States (USA); Terrence Silkaitis; Michael Klueh; Justin Mortimer; Doug Van Wie	7:20.54
4 × 100 m medley relay	Ukraine (UKR); Anton Bugayov; Oleg Lisogor; Sergiy Advena; Denys Syzonenko	3:38.49	United States (USA); Matt Grevers; Kevin Swander; Peter Verhoef; Terrence Silkaitis	3:39.35	Japan (JPN); Masafumi Yamaguchi; Makoto Yamashita; Ryuichi Shibata; Hisayoshi Sato	3:39.36

== Women's events ==
Event	Gold		Silver		Bronze	
50 m freestyle	Maritza Correia (USA)	25.38	Svitlana Khakhlova (BLR)	25.41	Sarah Wanezek (USA)	25.60
100 m freestyle	Petra Dallmann (GER)	55.35	Annika Liebs (GER)	55.97	Jana Myšková (CZE)	56.40
200 m freestyle	Otylia Jędrzejczak (POL)	1:58.49	Annika Liebs (GER)	1:59.99	Petra Dallmann (GER)	2:00.81
400 m freestyle	Camelia Potec (ROU)	4:10.88	Rebecca Cooke (GBR)	4:12.11	Chanelle Charron-Watson (CAN)	4:13.27
800 m freestyle	Rebecca Cooke (GBR)	8:31.43	Hayley Peirsol (USA)	8:32.89	Camelia Potec (ROU)	8:33.33
1500 m freestyle	Hayley Peirsol (USA)	16:08.06	Rebecca Cooke (GBR)	16:22.47	Jana Pechanová (CZE)	16:37.77
50 m backstroke	Aya Terakawa (JPN)	29.06	Jennifer Carroll (CAN)	29.32	Sviatlana Khakhlova (BLR)	29.42
100 m backstroke	Aya Terakawa (JPN)	1:01.38	Masaki Oikawa (JPN)	1:02.44	Iryna Amshennikova (UKR)	1:02.53
200 m backstroke	Aya Terakawa (JPN)	2:11.81	Takami Igarashi (JPN)	2:12.23	Annika Liebs (GER)	2:13.99
50 m breaststroke	Megan Jendrick (USA)	30.88	Yekaterina Kormacheva (RUS)	31.79	Janne Schäfer (GER)	31.92
100 m breaststroke	Megan Jendrick (USA)	1:08.20	Rebecca Soni (USA)	1:08.77	Beata Kaminska (POL)	1:09.03
200 m breaststroke	Megumi Taneda (JPN)	2:27.81	Rebecca Soni (USA)	2:27.84	Qi Hui (CHN)	2:27.94
50 m butterfly	Vasilissa Vladykina (RUS)	26.88	Dana Vollmer (USA)	26.91	Cristina Maccagnola (ITA)	26.99
100 m butterfly	Otylia Jędrzejczak (POL)	58.74	Sarah Healy (swimmer) (GBR)	1:00.09	Demerae Christianson (USA)	1:00.16
200 m butterfly	Otylia Jędrzejczak (POL)	2:09.67	Kim Vandenberg (USA)	2:10.40	Terri Dunning (GBR)	2:11.73
200 m individual medley	Qi Hui (CHN)	2:14.99	Helen Norfolk (NZL)	2:16.03	Nicole Hetzer (GER)	2:17.22
400 m individual medley	Qi Hui (CHN)	4:45.24	Rebecca Cooke (GBR)	4:45.62	Nicole Hetzer (GER)	4:46.62
4 × 100 m freestyle relay	United States (USA); Andrea Hupman; Maritza Correia; Sarah Wanezek; Dana Vollmer	3:43.97	New Zealand (NZL); Alison Fitch; Helen Norfolk; Georgina Toomey; Rina Te Taite	3:46.59	France (FRA); Elsa N'Guessan; Mylène Lazare; Amandine Bouysset; Angela Tavernier	3:46.68
4 × 200 m freestyle relay	United States (USA); Lauren Medina; Elizabeth Hill; Ashley Chandler; Carmen Retrum	8:05.92	New Zealand (NZL); Helen Norfolk; Melissa Ingram; Alison Fitch; Rina Te Taite	8:09.09	France (FRA); Angela Tavernier; Sophie Huber; Mylène Lazare; Elsa N'Guessan	8:09.50
4 × 100 m medley relay	United States (USA); Hayley McGregory; Megan Jendrick; Demerae Christianson; Maritza Correia	4:07.00	Japan (JPN); Aya Terakawa; Fumiko Kawanabe; Kozue Watanabe; Kaori Yamada	4:08.99	Russia (RUS); Irina Zhiburt; Yekaterina Kormacheva; Irina Bespalova; Kira Volodina	4:10.36

== Medal table ==
Rank	Nation	Gold	Silver	Bronze	Total
1	United States (USA)	11	9	4	24
2	Poland (POL)	6	0	2	8
3	Japan (JPN)	5	6	9	20
4	Ukraine (UKR)	5	1	3	9
5	Russia (RUS)	4	5	1	10
6	Great Britain (GBR)	2	7	1	10
7	China (CHN)	2	0	2	4
8	Germany (GER)	1	3	5	9
9	France (FRA)	1	0	2	3
9	Italy (ITA)	1	0	2	3
11	Romania (ROM)	1	0	1	2
12	Slovenia (SLO)	1	0	0	1
13	New Zealand (NZL)	0	3	0	3
14	Canada (CAN)	0	1	2	3
15	Belarus (BLR)	0	1	1	2
16	Hungary (HUN)	0	1	0	1
16	Kazakhstan (KAZ)	0	1	0	1
16	Lithuania (LTU)	0	1	0	1
16	South Korea (KOR)	0	1	0	1
20	Brazil (BRA)	0	0	2	2
20	Czech Republic (CZE)	0	0	2	2
22	Austria (AUT)	0	0	1	1
Totals (22 entries)		40	40	40	120
