= Eduardo Lorente =

Spanish swimmer

Personal information
- Born: 24 May 1977 (age 49) Barcelona, Catalonia, Spain
Medal record
Men's Swimming
Representing Spain
European Championships (SC)
Gold medal – first place	2006 Helsinki	50m Freestyle
Bronze medal – third place	2004 Vienna	50m Freestyle
Mediterranean Games
Silver medal – second place	2005 Almería	50m Freestyle
Silver medal – second place	2005 Almería	4x100m Freestyle
Silver medal – second place	2005 Almería	4x100m Medley

Eduardo Lorente Ginesta (born 24 May 1977 in Barcelona, Catalonia) is a freestyle swimmer from Spain, who competed at two consecutive Summer Olympics for his native country, starting in 2000 in Sydney, Australia. The sprinter won the gold medal in the 50m Freestyle at the European SC Championships 2006 in Helsinki, Finland.
