= Nuria Domínguez =

Canadian-born Spanish rower

Personal information
- Born: 30 January 1974 (age 52)
Medal record
Women's rowing
Representing Spain
Mediterranean Games
Bronze medal – third place	2005 Almería	Single Sculls

Nuria Domínguez Asensio (born 30 January 1974 in Toronto, Ontario) is a female competition rower from Spain, who was born in Canada. A bronze medal winner at the 2005 Mediterranean Games she represented Spain at three Summer Olympics: 1996, 2004 and 2008.
