= Elsa N'Guessan =

French swimmer (born 1984)

Personal information
- Born: 17 September 1984 (age 42) Poitiers, Vienne, France
- Height: 1.81 m (5 ft 11 in)
- Weight: 69 kg (152 lb)

Sport
- Sport: Swimming
Medal record
European Championships (LC)
Silver medal – second place	2004 Madrid	4×200 m freestyle
Summer Universiade
Bronze medal – third place	2005 Izmir	4×100 m freestyle
Bronze medal – third place	2005 Izmir	4×200 m freestyle
Mediterranean Games
Gold medal – first place	2005 Almería	4×100 m freestyle
Gold medal – first place	2005 Almería	4×200 m freestyle

Elsa N'Guessan (born 17 September 1984 in Poitiers, Vienne) is a female freestyle swimmer from France, who competed for her native country at the 2004 Summer Olympics in Athens, Greece.
