= María Fuster =

Spanish swimmer (born 1985)

Personal information
- Full name: María Fuster Martínez
- Nationality: Spanish
- Born: 4 March 1985 (age 41) Palma de Mallorca, Spain

Sport
- Sport: Swimming
Medal record
Representing Spain
Mediterranean Games
Silver medal – second place	2005 Almeria	4x100m freestyle relay
Silver medal – second place	2005 Almeria	4x100m medley relay
Silver medal – second place	2009 Pescara	4x100m medley
Bronze medal – third place	2009 Pescara	100m freestyle
Bronze medal – third place	2009 Pescara	4x100m freestyle relay

María Fuster Martínez (Note: In this Spanish name, the first or paternal surname is Fuster.) (born 4 March 1985 in Palma de Mallorca) is a Spanish freestyle swimmer who competed in the 2008 Summer Olympics.
