= Cylia Vabre =

French swimmer

Personal information
- Full name: Cylia Vabre
- National team: France
- Born: 1 March 1984 (age 42) Montélimar, France
- Height: 1.63 m (5 ft 4 in)
- Weight: 60 kg (132 lb)

Sport
- Sport: Swimming
- Strokes: Individual medley
- Club: Lyon Natation
- Coach: Richard Martinez

Cylia Vabre (born March 1, 1984, in Montélimar) is a French swimmer, who specialized in individual medley events. She represented her nation France, alongside her teammate Camille Muffat in the 200 m individual medley at the 2008 Summer Olympics, and has been a member of Lyon Natation in Lyon throughout her sporting career, under the tutelage of her personal coach Richard Martinez.

Vabre competed for the French swimming squad in the women's 200 m individual medley at the 2008 Summer Olympics in Beijing. She finished behind the winner Camille Muffat with a second-place time in 2:13.19 to assure her selection to the Olympic team and achieve the FINA A-standard (2:15.27) at the French Championships in Dunkirk. Swimming in heat four alongside her French rival Muffat, Vabre managed to strengthen her lead over the rest of the field on an electrifying butterfly leg, but dropped almost towards the end of the pack with a seventh-place time in 2:14.25. Vabre failed to advance to the semifinals, as she placed twenty-first overall out of thirty-nine swimmers in the prelims.
