= David Berbotto =

Italian swimmer (born 1980)

Personal information
- Born: 7 July 1980 (age 45) Alba, Cuneo, Italy
Medal record
Men's swimming
Representing Italy
World Championships - Short Course
Gold medal – first place	2006 Shanghai	4x200m Freestyle
European Aquatics Championships (LC)
Gold medal – first place	2006 Budapest	4x200m Freestyle
Universiade
Bronze medal – third place	2003 Daegu	4x200m Freestyle
Mediterranean Games
Gold medal – first place	2001 Tunis	4x200m Freestyle
Gold medal – first place	2005 Almería	200m Freestyle
Gold medal – first place	2005 Almería	4x200m Freestyle
Gold medal – first place	2005 Almería	200m Freestyle
Bronze medal – third place	2005 Almería	4x100m Medley

David Berbotto (born 7 July 1980 in Alba, Cuneo) is an Italian freestyle swimmer.

Berbotto's major achievement is the victory with the Italian relay in Budapest 2006, resulting in a new European Record.

David Berbotto made a bet before the European Championship of Budapest 2006 with his club's president Marco Durante. Since Italy won the 4 x 200 relay setting the new European record and Berbotto swum under 1:48.00 (1:47.87), Durante gave him an Alfa Brera.
