= Alice Carpanese =

Italian swimmer (born 1987)

Personal information
- Born: November 19, 1987 (age 38)

Sport
- Sport: Swimming
Medal record
Representing Italy
Summer Universiade
Bronze medal – third place	2007 Bangkok	4x200m freestyle relay
European Championships
Bronze medal – third place	2008 Eindhoven	4x200m freestyle relay
Mediterranean Games
Bronze medal – third place	2005 Almeria	4x200m freestyle relay
Bronze medal – third place	2005 Almeria	4x100m medley relay

Alice Carpanese (born 19 November 1987) is an Italian swimmer who competed in the 2008 Summer Olympics in Beijing.
