= Mattia Nalesso =

Italian swimmer

Personal information
- Born: February 13, 1981 (age 45)

Sport
- Sport: Swimming
- Club: Centro Sportivo Carabinieri
Medal record
Representing Italy
Mediterranean Games
Gold medal – first place	2001 Tunis	4x100m medley relay
Silver medal – second place	2001 Tunis	100m butterfly
Silver medal – second place	2005 Almeria	50m butterfly
Bronze medal – third place	2005 Almeria	4x100m medley relay

Mattia Nalesso (born 13 February 1981) is an Italian butterfly swimmer who competed in both the 2004 Summer Olympics and the 2008 Summer Olympics.
