= Christian Galenda =

Italian swimmer (born 1982)

Personal information
- Born: 18 January 1982 (age 44) Dolo, Italy

Sport
- Sport: Swimming
Medal record
Event	1st	2nd	3rd
World Championships (LC)	0	1	0
World Championships (SC)	1	0	1
European Championships (LC)	4	1	2
European Championships (SC)	0	2	2
Mediterranean Games	1	1	1
Total	6	5	6
World Championships (LC)
Silver medal – second place	2007 Melbourne	4×100 m freestyle
World Championships (SC)
Gold medal – first place	2006 Shanghai	4×100 m freestyle
European Championships (LC)
Gold medal – first place	2004 Madrid	4×100 m freestyle
Gold medal – first place	2006 Budapest	4×100 m freestyle
Silver medal – second place	2008 Eindhoven	4×100 m freestyle
Bronze medal – third place	2004 Madrid	100 m freestyle
Bronze medal – third place	2002 Berlin	4×100 m freestyle
European Championships (SC)
Silver medal – second place	2008 Rijeka	100 m medley
Bronze medal – third place	2003 Dublin	100 m freestyle
Mediterranean Games
Gold medal – first place	2005 Almería	4×200 m freestyle

Christian Galenda (born 18 January 1982) is a freestyle swimmer from Italy, who won the bronze medal in the men's individual 100 metres freestyle event at the 2004 European Championships. He represented his native country a couple of months later at the 2004 Summer Olympics in Athens, Greece. He was born in Dolo.

== See also ==
- Italian swimmers multiple medalists at the international competitions
