= Jernej Godec =

Slovenian swimmer

Personal information
- Full name: Jernej Godec
- Nationality: Slovenia
- Born: January 16, 1986 (age 40) Ljubljana, Slovenia, Yugoslavia
- Height: 1.90 m (6 ft 3 in)
- Weight: 95 kg (209 lb)

Sport
- Sport: Swimming
- Strokes: Freestyle and butterfly
- Club: Plavalni Klub Ilirija (Slovenia), Cal Aquatics (United States), Stade Français Olympique Courbevoie (France)
- College team: University of California, Berkeley
Medal record
Men's swimming
European Junior Championships
Bronze medal – third place	2003 Glasgow	100 m freestyle
Mediterranean Games
Bronze medal – third place	2005 Almería	50 m freestyle
Universiade
Gold medal – first place	2009 Belgrade	50 m butterfly

Jernej Godec (born January 16, 1986, in Ljubljana) is a freestyle and butterfly swimmer from Slovenia, who competed for his native country at the 2004 Summer Olympics in Athens, Greece and the 2008 Summer Olympics in Beijing, China.

Member of the Ilirija Swimming Club from Ljubljana, Slovenia; his former coaches include Aleš Cerkovnik and Borut Klinec but in 2004 moved to the USA as a student-athlete majoring in Molecular and Cell Biology and competing for the University of California, Berkeley. After training with coach Mike Bottom for several years he continued under the current Cal Golden Bears swimming team head coach Dave Durden. He moved to Boston, MA to continue pursuing a doctoral degree in Immunology at Harvard University, which he completed in 2016. Jernej now lives in New York City, NY.

Godec currently holds the Slovenian national records in 50 m freestyle (22.19) and 50 m butterfly (23.20) in long course (50 m) swimming pools as well as 50 meter butterfly (22.47), 50 meter freestyle (21.18), and 50 meter backstroke (23.53) in short course (25 m) pools and still holds numerous national records in different age group categories. With these times, he is currently ranked as 15th in 50m butterfly (long course meters pool) and 9th in 50m butterfly, 17th in 50m freestyle, 21st in 50m backstroke (short course meters pool) on the FINA all-time world rankings. He is married to a dermatologist in Winchester.

== Achievements ==
- 2003:
  - European Junior Championships — 3rd, 100 m freestyle; 5th, 200 m freestyle
  - World Aquatics Championships — 10th, 4×100 m medley relay
- 2004: Olympic Games, Athens — 14th, 4×100 m medley relay
- 2005:
  - World Aquatics Championships — 19th, 50 m butterfly; 25th, 50 m freestyle; 12th, 4×100 m freestyle relay; final, 4×100 m medley relay (dq)
  - Mediterranean Games — 3rd, 50 m freestyle
- 2006: European LC Championships — 9th, 50 m butterfly; 11th, 50 m freestyle; 14th, 100 m butterfly
- 2007: World Aquatics Championships — 14th, 50 m freestyle; 14th, 50 m butterfly
- 2008:
  - Olympic Games, Beijing — 18th, 50 m freestyle
  - World Short Course Swimming Championships — 7th, 50 m freestyle; 12th, 50 m butterfly
- 2009:
  - World Aquatics Championships — 12th, 50 m butterfly
  - World University Games — 1st, 50 m butterfly
  - CISM World Military Championships — 1st, 50 m butterfly (CISM Record); 1st, 50 m freestyle; 2nd, 100 m freestyle
  - European Short Course Swimming Championships — 4th, 50 m butterfly; 10th, 50 m freestyle; 10th, 4x50m medley relay: 12th 50m backstroke

== See also ==
- California Golden Bears
