= Sara Pérez (triathlete) =

Spanish swimmer

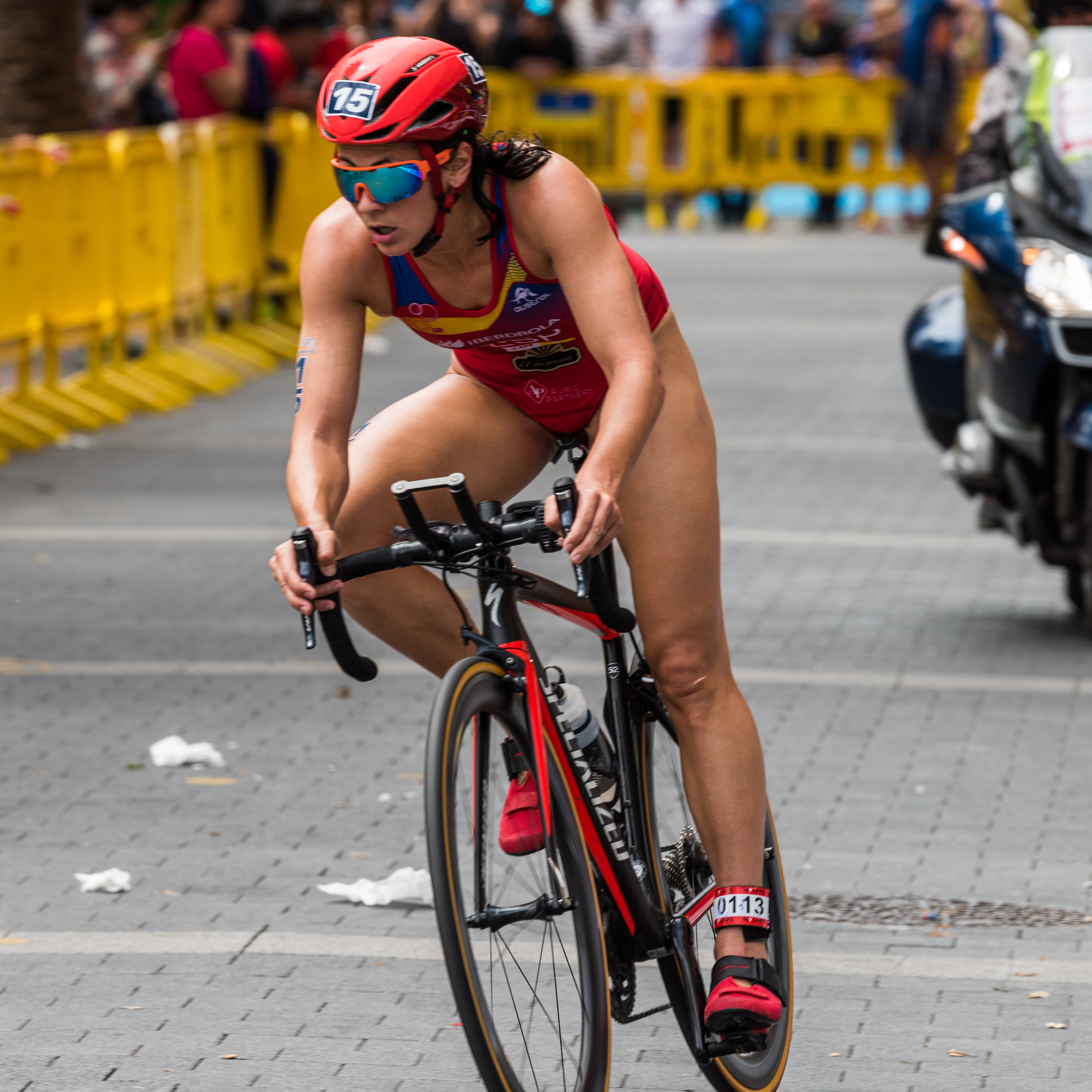
- Pérez in 2018

Personal information
- Full name: Sara Pérez Sala
- Born: 12 January 1988 (age 38) Barcelona, Catalonia

Sport
- Country: Spain
- Sport: Swimming; Triathlon; Road cycling
- Sports career
- Height: 1.80 m (5 ft 11 in)
- Weight: 65 kg (143 lb)
- Sport: Swimming
- Strokes: Breaststroke
- Club: Atlètico Barceloneta
Medal record
Representing Spain
Women's swimming
Mediterranean Games
Gold medal – first place	2005 Almería	100 m breaststroke
Silver medal – second place	2005 Almería	100 m breaststroke
Silver medal – second place	2005 Almería	4x100 m medley relay
- Cycling career
- Sport: Cycling
- Discipline: Road
- Role: Rider

Professional team
- 2020: Río Miera–Cantabria Deporte

Sara Pérez Sala (born 12 January 1988) is a Spanish triathlete and road cyclist, who most recently rode for UCI Women's Continental Team Río Miera–Cantabria Deporte. Pérez also competed as a breaststroke swimmer for Spain at the 2004 Summer Olympics in Athens, Greece.
