= Egypt at the 2005 Mediterranean Games =

- IOC code: EGY
- NOC: Egyptian Olympic Committee

in Almería
- Medals Ranked 5th: Gold 15 Silver 10 Bronze 18 Total 43

Mediterranean Games appearances (overview)
- 1951; 1955; 1959–1967; 1971; 1975; 1979; 1983; 1987; 1991; 1993; 1997; 2001; 2005; 2009; 2013; 2018; 2022

Other related appearances
- United Arab Republic (1959, 1963)

Egypt (EGY) competed at the 2005 Mediterranean Games in Almería, Spain with a total number of 137 participants (113 men and 24 women).

== Medals ==
=== Gold ===
Boxing

- Men's Middleweight (– 75 kg): Mohamed Hikal

Karate

- Men's Middleweight (– 70 kg): Mohamed Shemy
- Women's Middleweight (– 60 kg): Heba Adly

Wrestling

- Men's freestyle (– 60 kg): Hassan Ibrahim
- Men's Greco-Roman (– 60 kg): Ashraf El Gharabaly
- Men's Greco-Roman (– 84 kg): Mohamed Mohamed
- Men's Greco-Roman (– 96 kg): Karam Gaber

=== Silver ===
Judo

- Men's Middleweight (– 90 kg): Hisham Mesbah
- Men's Half-Heavyweight (– 100 kg): Bassel El Gharbawy

Swimming

- Men's 100m Backstroke: Ahmed Hussein

Wrestling

- Men's freestyle (– 120 kg): Hisham Mohamed
- Men's Greco-Roman (– 55 kg): Mohamed Abou
- Men's Greco-Roman (– 74 kg): Ahmed Salem

=== Bronze ===
Boxing

- Men's Flyweight (– 51 kg): Mohamed Eliwa
- Men's Super Heavyweight (+ 91 kg): Bakr Shouman

Judo

- Men's Half-Lightweight (– 66 kg): Amin Mahmoud
- Men's Heavyweight (+ 100 kg): Islam El Shahaby

Rowing

- Men's Coxless Pairs: Mohamed Gomaa and El Bakry Yehia

Swimming

- Men's 50m Backstroke: Ahmed Hussein
- Men's 200m Backstroke: Ahmed Hussein

Wrestling

- Men's Freestyle (– 66 kg): Walid El Aal
- Men's Freestyle (– 84 kg): Mahmoud Attia
- Men's Freestyle (– 96 kg): Saleh Emara
- Men's Greco-Roman (– 120 kg): Yasser Sakr
- Women Freestyle (– 48 kg): Sahar Zayed

== Results by event ==
Boxing

- Men's Light Flyweight (– 48 kg)
  - Ramadan Rezk Alla
- Men's Flyweight (– 51 kg)
  - Mohamed Eliwa
- Men's Bantamweight (– 54 kg)
  - Yasin El-Hamid
- Men's Featherweight (– 57 kg)
  - Tarek Abdel-Aal
- Men's Super Lightweight (– 64 kg)
  - Saleh Khoulif
- Men's Welterweight (– 69 kg)
  - Mohamed Mohamed
- Men's Middleweight (– 75 kg)
  - Mohamed Hikal
- Men's Light Heavyweight (– 81 kg)
  - Ramadan Yasser
- Men's Heavyweight (– 91 kg)
  - Ahmed Hefny
- Men's Super Heavyweight (+ 91 kg)
  - Bakr Shouman

== See also ==
- Egypt at the 2004 Summer Olympics
- Egypt at the 2008 Summer Olympics
