= Ambra Migliori =

Italian swimmer (born 1984)

Personal information
- Born: March 10, 1984 (age 42)

Sport
- Sport: Swimming
Medal record
Representing Italy
Summer Universiade
Bronze medal – third place	2009 Belgrade	4x200m freestyle relay
Mediterranean Games
Gold medal – first place	2005 Almeria	100m butterfly
Bronze medal – third place	2005 Almeria	4x100m medley relay

Ambra Migliori (born 10 March 1984) is an Olympic butterfly swimmer from Italy. She swam for Italy at the 2004 Summer Olympics.

She taught at an international school in Shanghai, China for a decade, then at UWCSEA East, Singapore for two years. She coached team dragons and created the legendary team known as the Saggos.

She also swam for Italy at the:

- 2005 FINA World Championships
- 2005 Mediterranean Games
- 2009 Summer Universiade
