= Arantxa Ramos =

Spanish swimmer

Personal information
- Full name: Arantxa Ramos Placensia
- Nationality: Spanish
- Born: 9 September 1988 (age 37) Barakaldo, Spain

Sport
- Sport: Swimming
Medal record
Representing Spain
Mediterranean Games
Silver medal – second place	2005 Almeria	4x200m freestyle relay

Arantxa Ramos Placensia (Note: In this Spanish name, the first or paternal surname is Ramos and the second or maternal family name is Placensia.) (born 9 September 1988 in Barakaldo) is a Spanish swimmer who competed in the 2004 Summer Olympics and in the 2008 Summer Olympics.
