= Francesca Segat =

Italian swimmer (born 1983)

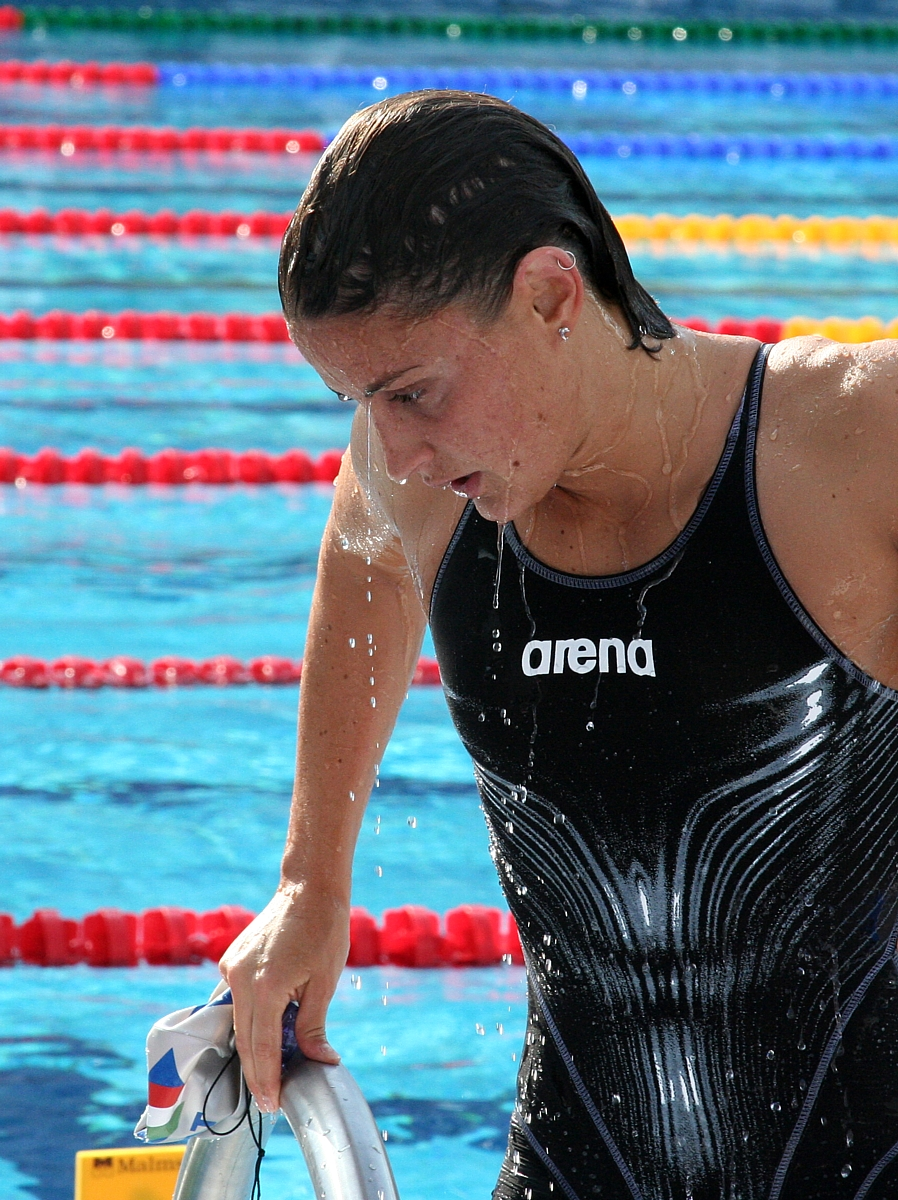

Personal information
- Born: 21 January 1983 (age 43)
Medal record
Women's swimming
Representing Italy
World Championships (SC)
Silver medal – second place	2006 Shanghai	200 m butterfly
European Championships (LC)
Silver medal – second place	2006 Budapest	200 m butterfly
European Championships (SC)
Gold medal – first place	2008 Rijeka	200 m medley
Silver medal – second place	2009 Istanbul	200 m medley
Bronze medal – third place	2008 Rijeka	100 m medley
Bronze medal – third place	2008 Rijeka	400 m medley
Mediterranean Games
Bronze medal – third place	2005 Almería	50 m butterfly
Bronze medal – third place	2005 Almería	100 m butterfly
Bronze medal – third place	2005 Almería	200 m butterfly

Francesca Segat (born 21 January 1983 in Vittorio Veneto, Province of Treviso) is a butterfly swimmer from Italy who won the silver medal in the 200 m butterfly at the European Short Course Swimming Championships 2003.

Francesca Segat also won the silver medal at the World SC Championship in Shanghai in 2006 in the 200 m butterfly with a time of 2:05.91, and she won the silver medal at the European Championship 2006 in Budapest in the same event with a time of 2:08.96.

She resides in Rome and is trained by Andrea Palloni and Claudio Rossetto.

== See also ==
- List of European Short Course Swimming Championships medalists (women)
