= Nikos Xylouris (swimmer) =

Greek swimmer (born 1982)

Personal information
- Born: April 5, 1982 (age 44) Athens, Greece

Sport
- Sport: Swimming
Medal record
Representing Greece
European Championships
Bronze medal – third place	2002 Berlin	4x200m freestyle relay
Bronze medal – third place	2006 Budapest	4x200m freestyle relay
Mediterranean Games
Gold medal – first place	2001 Tunis	4x200m freestyle relay

Nikos Xylouris (born 5 April 1982) is a Greek swimmer who competed in the 2004 Summer Olympics and in the 2008 Summer Olympics.
