= Andreas Zisimos =

Greek swimmer (born 1983)

Personal information
- Born: 31 December 1983 (age 42) Athens, Greece
Medal record
Men's swimming
Representing Greece
European Championships (LC)
Bronze medal – third place	2006 Budapest	4×200 m freestyle
Mediterranean Games
Silver medal – second place	2005 Almería	4×200 m freestyle
Bronze medal – third place	2005 Almería	4×100 m freestyle

Andreas Zisimos (Greek: Ανδρέας Ζήσιμος; born 31 December 1983) is a freestyle swimmer from Greece. He won two medals at the 2005 Mediterranean Games, and represented his native country at two consecutive Summer Olympics, starting in 2004.
