= Croatia at the 2005 Mediterranean Games =

- IOC code: CRO
- NOC: Croatian Olympic Committee

in Almería
- Competitors: 200 participants (117 men and 83 women)
- Medals Ranked 11th: Gold 5 Silver 10 Bronze 11 Total 26

Mediterranean Games appearances (overview)
- 1993; 1997; 2001; 2005; 2009; 2013; 2018; 2022

Other related appearances
- Yugoslavia (1951–1991)

Croatia (CRO) competed at the 2005 Mediterranean Games in Almería, Spain with a total number of 200 participants (117 men and 83 women).

== Medals by sport ==
Sport	Gold	Silver	Bronze	Total
Canoeing	2	0	0	2
Athletics	1	1	3	5
Table tennis	1	1	0	2
Rowing	1	0	0	1
Swimming	0	3	2	5
Handball	0	1	1	2
Tennis	0	1	1	2
Basketball	0	1	0	1
Karate	0	1	0	1
Shooting	0	1	0	1
Boxing	0	0	3	3
Sailing	0	0	1	1
Totals (12 entries)	5	10	11	26

== Medalists ==
Medal	Name	Sport	Event	Date
Gold	Edis Elkasević	Athletics	Men's shot put	2 July
Gold	Tamara Boroš	Table tennis	Women's singles	
Gold	Mirna Rajle	Rowing	Women's lightweight single sculls	
Gold	Stjepan Janić and Mićo Janić	Canoeing	Men's K-2 500m	
Gold	Stjepan Janić	Canoeing	Men's K-1 1000m	
Silver	Željko Vincek	Athletics	Men's 400 meters	1 July
Silver	Petra Naranđa	Karate	Women's 60 kg	
Silver	Sanja Jovanović	Swimming	Women's 50 m butterfly	
Silver	Gordan Kožulj	Swimming	Men's 200m backstroke	
Silver	Dajana Zoretić	Swimming	Women's 50 m breaststroke	
Silver	Roko Tošić	Table tennis	Men's singles	
Silver	Suzana Špirelja	Shooting	Women's 50 m rifle 3 positions	
Silver	Matea Mezak and Ana Vrljić	Tennis	Women's doubles	
Silver	Women's basketball team: Marta Čakić Božena Erceg Jelena Ivezić Anđa Jelavić Dea Klein-Šumanovac Sandra Pešić Emilija Podrug Sandra Popović Ana Roca Iva Serdar	Basketball	Women's tournament	
Silver	Men's handball team: Damir Bičanić Nikola Blažičko Denis Buntić Josip Čale Ivan Čupić Zlatko Horvat Tomislav Huljina Krešimir Ivanković Marin Knez Branimir Koloper Mario Obad Vladimir Ostarčević Ivan Pongračić Vjenceslav Somić Ljubo Vukić Drago Vuković	Handball	Men's tournament	
Bronze	Sanja Jovanović	Swimming	Women's 100 m backstroke	
Bronze	Alexei Puninski	Swimming	Men's 50 m butterfly	
Bronze	Josip Šoprek	Athletics	Men's 200 meters	29 June
Bronze	Jurica Grabušić	Athletics	Men's 110 meters hurdles	29 June
Bronze	Vera Begić	Athletics	Women's discus throw	2 July
Bronze	Borna Katalinić	Boxing	Men's welterweight	
Bronze	Marijo Šivolija	Boxing	Men's light heavyweight	
Bronze	Vedran Đipalo	Boxing	Men's heavyweight	
Bronze	Matea Mezak	Tennis	Women's singles	
Bronze	Women's handball team: Maida Arslanagić Maja Čop Dijana Golubić Jelena Grubišić Lidija Horvat Ivana Jelčić Sanela Knezović Maja Kožnjak Svitlana Pasičnik Andrea Penezić Antonela Pensa Nikica Pušić Sandra Stojković Tihana Šarić Miranda Tatari Maja Zebić	Handball	Women's tournament	

== See also ==
- Croatia at the 2004 Summer Olympics
- Croatia at the 2008 Summer Olympics
