= Tunisia at the 2000 Summer Olympics =

- IOC code: TUN
- NOC: Tunisian Olympic Committee
- Website: www.cnot.org.tn (in French)

in Sydney
- Competitors: 47 (40 men and 7 women) in 10 sports
- Flag bearer: Omrane Ayari
- Medals: Gold 0 Silver 0 Bronze 0 Total 0

Summer Olympics appearances (overview)
- 1960; 1964; 1968; 1972; 1976; 1980; 1984; 1988; 1992; 1996; 2000; 2004; 2008; 2012; 2016; 2020; 2024

Tunisia competed at the 2000 Summer Olympics in Sydney, Australia. 47 competitors, 40 men and 7 women, took part in 34 events in 10 sports.

== Competitors ==
The following is the list of number of competitors in the Games.

Sport	Men	Women	Total
Athletics	6	3	9
Boxing	5	–	5
Fencing	1	0	1
Handball	14	0	14
Judo	6	3	9
Rowing	1	1	2
Swimming	1	0	1
Table tennis	1	0	1
Weightlifting	1	0	1
Wrestling	4	–	4
Total	40	7	47

== Athletics ==
Men
Track and road events

Athletes	Events	Heat Round 1		Heat Round 2		Semifinal		Final	
Athletes	Events	Time	Rank	Time	Rank	Time	Rank	Time	Rank
Soufiene Labidi	400 metres	45.84	3 Q	46.01	7	did not advance			
Mohamed Habib Belhadj	800 metres	01:49.14	7	did not advance					
Lotfi Turki	3000 metres steeplechase	08:34.84	8	did not advance					
Tahar Mansouri	Marathon	—						2:20:33	38
Hatem Ghoula	20 km walk	—						1:28:16	36

Field events

Athlete	Event	Qualification		Final	
Athlete	Event	Result	Rank	Result	Rank
Maher Ridane	Javelin throw	70.35	32	did not advance	

Women
Track and road events

Athletes	Events	Heat Round 1		Heat Round 2		Semifinal		Final	
Athletes	Events	Time	Rank	Time	Rank	Time	Rank	Time	Rank
Awatef Ben Hassine	400 metres	54.50	7	did not advance					
Fatma Lanouar	1500 metres	04:11.87	8	did not advance					

Field events

Athlete	Event	Qualification		Final	
Athlete	Event	Result	Rank	Result	Rank
Monia Kari	Discus throw	56.32	23	did not advance	

== Boxing ==
Men

Athlete	Event	Round of 32	Round of 16	Quarterfinals	Semifinals	Final	
Athlete	Event	Opposition Result	Opposition Result	Opposition Result	Opposition Result	Opposition Result	Rank
Moez Zemzeni	Bantamweight	Rigondeaux (CUB); L KO	did not advance				
Naoufel Ben Rabah	Lightweight	Jackson (USA); L 7-19	did not advance				
Sami Khelifi	Light-welterweight	Leonov (RUS); L 9-14	did not advance				
Kamel Chater	Welterweight	BYE	Khairov (AZE); L 8-13	did not advance			
Mohamed Marmouri	Light middleweight	Osumanu (GHA); W RSC	Sierra (CUB); L RSC	did not advance			

== Fencing ==
One male fencer represented Tunisia in 2000.

Men

Athlete	Event	Round of 64	Round of 32	Round of 16	Quarterfinal	Semifinal	Final / BM	
Athlete	Event	Opposition Score	Opposition Score	Opposition Score	Opposition Score	Opposition Score	Opposition Score	Rank
Maher Ben Aziza	Individual foil	Mocek (POL); L 2-15	did not advance					39

== Handball ==
=== Preliminary round ===
- Ali Madi
- Anouar Ayed
- Dhaker Seboui
- Haikel Meguennem
- Issam Tej
- Makrem Jerou
- Mohamed Madi
- Mohamed Messaoudi
- Mohamed Riadh Sanaa
- Oualid Ben Amor
- Ouissem Bousnina
- Ouissem Hmam
- Slim Zehani
- Sobhi Sioud

=== Group B ===
Team	Pld	W	D	L	GF	GA	GD	Points
Sweden	5	5	0	0	155	121	+34	10
France	5	3	1	1	120	104	+16	7
Spain	5	3	0	2	144	126	+18	6
Slovenia	5	2	1	2	137	127	+10	5
Tunisia	5	1	0	4	111	117	–6	2
Australia	5	0	0	5	106	178	–72	0

16 September

Spain	24–22	Tunisia

18 September

France	20–17	Tunisia

20 September

Sweden	27–18	Tunisia

22 September

Australia	24–34	Tunisia

24 September

Slovenia	22–20	Tunisia

=== 9th / 10th place ===
South Korea	24–19	Tunisia

== Judo ==
Men

Athlete	Event	Preliminary	Round of 32	Round of 16	Quarterfinals	Semifinals	Repechage 1	Repechage 2	Repechage 3	Final / BM	
Athlete	Event	Opposition Result	Opposition Result	Opposition Result	Opposition Result	Opposition Result	Opposition Result	Opposition Result	Opposition Result	Opposition Result	Rank
Makrem Ayed	−60 kg	BYE	Adrian Robertson (AUS); W 1000–0000	Marek Matuszek (SVK); L 0000-1000	did not advance						28
Anis Lounifi	−66 kg	—	Yukimasa Nakamura (JPN); L 0000-1000	did not advance							21
Hassen Moussa	−73 kg	BYE	Martin Schmidt (GER); W 0001–0000	Giuseppe Maddaloni (ITA); L 0000-1000	did not advance		Travolta Paparino Waterhouse (SAM); W 1000–0000	Vsevolods Zeļonijs (LAT); L 0000-1000	did not advance		10
Abdessalem Arous	81 kg	BYE	Graeme Randall (GBR); L 0000-1000	did not advance							18
Iskander Hachicha	90 kg	BYE	Sergey Shakimov (KAZ); W 1000-0000	Hidehiko Yoshida (JPN); L 0000-1000	did not advance						29
Sadok Khalgui	100 kg	BYE	Daniel Rusitovic (AUS); W 0010-0000	Luigi Guido (ITA); L 0000-1000	did not advance		Armen Bagdasarov (UZB); L 0000-1000	did not advance			15

Women

Athlete	Event	Preliminary	Round of 32	Round of 16	Quarterfinals	Semifinals	Repechage 1	Repechage 2	Repechage 3	Final / BM	
Athlete	Event	Opposition Result	Opposition Result	Opposition Result	Opposition Result	Opposition Result	Opposition Result	Opposition Result	Opposition Result	Opposition Result	Rank
Hayet Rouini	−48 kg	—	Ann Simons (BEL); L 0000-0010	did not advance							23
Saida Dhahri	−63 kg	—	BYE	Anja von Rekowski (GER); L 0000-0010	did not advance		BYE	Karen Roberts (GBR); W 1000-0000	Jung Sung-sook (KOR); L 0000-0010	did not advance	7
Nesria Traki	−70 kg	—	Qin Dongya (CHN); W 0010-0000	Edith Bosch (NED); L 0000-0001	did not advance						20

== Rowing ==
Tunisian rowers qualified the following boats:

Men

Athlete	Event	Heats		Repechage		Semifinals		Final	
Athlete	Event	Time	Rank	Time	Rank	Time	Rank	Time	Rank
Riadh Ben Khedher	Single sculls	7:59.75	6 R	7:53.05	5 SC/D	7:47.86	6 FD	7:54.45	23

Women

Athlete	Event	Heats		Repechage		Semifinals		Final	
Athlete	Event	Time	Rank	Time	Rank	Time	Rank	Time	Rank
Ibtissem Trimèche	Single sculls	8:32.05	5 R	8:28.43	4 SC/D	8:30.60	3 FD	8:30.60	24

Qualification Legend: FA=Final A (medal); FB=Final B (non-medal); FC=Final C (non-medal); FD=Final D (non-medal); FE=Final E (non-medal); FF=Final F (non-medal); SA/B=Semifinals A/B; SC/D=Semifinals C/D; SE/F=Semifinals E/F; R=Repechage

== Swimming ==
Men

Athlete	Event	Heat		Semifinal		Final	
Athlete	Event	Time	Rank	Time	Rank	Time	Rank
Oussama Mellouli	400 m individual medley	04:41.97	43	did not advance			

== Table tennis ==
Athlete	Event	Group round		Round of 16	Quarterfinals	Semifinals	Bronze medal	Final	
Athlete	Event	Opposition Result	Rank	Opposition Result	Opposition Result	Opposition Result	Opposition Result	Opposition Result	Rank
Gdara Hamam	Women's singles	Group N Chang Yen-shu (TPE); L 0 – 3 Ding Yi (AUT); L 0 – 3	3	did not advance					

== Weightlifting ==
Men

Athlete	Event	Snatch		Clean & Jerk		Total	Rank
Athlete	Event	Result	Rank	Result	Rank	Total	Rank
Youssef Sbai	−69 kg	142.5	12	177.5	10	320.0	10

== Wrestling ==
Men's Greco-Roman

Athlete	Event	Round 1	Round 2	Round 3	Round 4	Round 5	Round 6	Final / BM	
Athlete	Event	Opposition Result	Opposition Result	Opposition Result	Opposition Result	Opposition Result	Opposition Result	Opposition Result	Rank
Mohamed Barguaoui	58 kg	Yıldız (GER); L 0-4	Borăscu (ROU); L 0-7	Nikonorov (RUS); L 0-11	did not advance				20
Amor Bach Hamba	85 kg	Vitt (UZB); L 1-4	Aanes (NOR); L 0-12	Tsitsiashvili (ISR); L 1-11	did not advance				16
Hassene Fkiri	97 kg	Saldadze (UKR); L 0-9	Lishtvan (BLR); L 0-10	Ežerskis (LTU); L 3-6	did not advance				17
Omrane Ayari	130 kg	Rulon Gardner (USA); L 2-7	Giuseppe Giunta (ITA); L 0-4	Haykaz Galstyan (ARM); L 2-3	did not advance				15
