= Handball at the 2005 Mediterranean Games – Women's tournament =

Women's handball at the 2005 Mediterranean Games
Tournament details
- Host country: Spain
- Venue(s): 1 (in 1 host city)
- Dates: 25 June – 1 July
- Teams: 8 (from 1 confederation)

Final positions
- Champions: Spain (1st title)
- Runners-up: Serbia and Montenegro
- Third place: Croatia
- Fourth place: France

Tournament statistics
- Matches played: 18
- Goals scored: 1,140 (63.33 per match)
- Top scorer(s): (Serbia and Montenegro) Tatjana Medved (42 goals)

The women's handball tournament at the 2005 Mediterranean Games was held from 25 June to 1 July in Vícar.

== Preliminary round ==
All times are local (UTC+2).

=== Group A ===
Pos	Team	Pld	W	D	L	GF	GA	GD	Pts	Qualification
1	Croatia	3	3	0	0	92	78	+14	6	Semifinals
2	France	3	2	0	1	97	89	+8	4	Semifinals
3	Italy	3	1	0	2	91	99	−8	2	Fifth place game
4	Slovenia	3	0	0	3	86	100	−14	0	Seventh place game

Source: Almeria 2005
Rules for classification: 1) Points; 2) Head-to-head points; 3) Head-to-head goal difference; 4) Head-to-head goals scored; 5) Goal difference; 6) Goals scored; 7) Draw.

25 June 2005; 12:15	Slovenia	31–39	Italy	Vícar Sports Hall, Vícar; Referees: Tsakonas, Chaskis (GRE)
25 June 2005; 12:15	Hrnjič 8	(18–22)	Di Fazzio 10	Vícar Sports Hall, Vícar; Referees: Tsakonas, Chaskis (GRE)
25 June 2005; 12:15	3× (yellow card) 4× (suspension) 1× (red card)	Report	3× (yellow card) 5× (suspension)	Vícar Sports Hall, Vícar; Referees: Tsakonas, Chaskis (GRE)

25 June 2005; 20:15	France	29–31	Croatia	Vícar Sports Hall, Vícar; Referees: Fernández, Permuy (ESP)
25 June 2005; 20:15	Spincer 8	(15–17)	Arslanagić 9	Vícar Sports Hall, Vícar; Referees: Fernández, Permuy (ESP)
25 June 2005; 20:15	2× (yellow card) 6× (suspension)	Report	4× (yellow card) 4× (suspension) 1× (red card)	Vícar Sports Hall, Vícar; Referees: Fernández, Permuy (ESP)

26 June 2005; 13:30	Slovenia	26–27	Croatia	Vícar Sports Hall, Vícar; Referees: Stanojević, Višekruna (SCG)
26 June 2005; 13:30	Hrnjič 7	(12–17)	Zebić 9	Vícar Sports Hall, Vícar; Referees: Stanojević, Višekruna (SCG)
26 June 2005; 13:30	4× (yellow card) 8× (suspension)	Report	3× (yellow card) 4× (suspension)	Vícar Sports Hall, Vícar; Referees: Stanojević, Višekruna (SCG)

26 June 2005; 20:15	France	34–29	Italy	Vícar Sports Hall, Vícar
26 June 2005; 20:15	Kamto Njitam, Spincer 7	(12–12)	Pistelli 10	Vícar Sports Hall, Vícar
26 June 2005; 20:15	2× (yellow card) 7× (suspension)	Report	2× (yellow card) 4× (suspension)	Vícar Sports Hall, Vícar

28 June 2005; 12:15	Croatia	34–23	Italy	Vícar Sports Hall, Vícar; Referees: Zidan, Ahmed (EGY)
28 June 2005; 12:15	Pasičnik 7	(15–8)	Anisenkova 7	Vícar Sports Hall, Vícar; Referees: Zidan, Ahmed (EGY)
28 June 2005; 12:15	3× (yellow card) 8× (suspension)	Report	3× (yellow card) 3× (suspension)	Vícar Sports Hall, Vícar; Referees: Zidan, Ahmed (EGY)

28 June 2005; 20:15	France	34–29	Slovenia	Vícar Sports Hall, Vícar; Referees: Al-Arayedh, Al-Askafi (BHR)
28 June 2005; 20:15	Legenty, Spincer 6	(15–16)	Potočnik 10	Vícar Sports Hall, Vícar; Referees: Al-Arayedh, Al-Askafi (BHR)
28 June 2005; 20:15	3× (yellow card) 11× (suspension) 1× (red card)	Report	4× (yellow card) 9× (suspension)	Vícar Sports Hall, Vícar; Referees: Al-Arayedh, Al-Askafi (BHR)

=== Group B ===
Pos	Team	Pld	W	D	L	GF	GA	GD	Pts	Qualification
1	Spain (H)	3	3	0	0	98	81	+17	6	Semifinals
2	Serbia and Montenegro	3	2	0	1	101	96	+5	4	Semifinals
3	Turkey	3	1	0	2	113	113	0	2	Fifth place game
4	Greece	3	0	0	3	82	104	−22	0	Seventh place game

Source: Almeria 2005
Rules for classification: 1) Points; 2) Head-to-head points; 3) Head-to-head goal difference; 4) Head-to-head goals scored; 5) Goal difference; 6) Goals scored; 7) Draw.
(H) Hosts

25 June 2005; 10:00	Serbia and Montenegro	37–30	Greece	Vícar Sports Hall, Vícar; Referees: Borrotti, Marcet (FRA)
25 June 2005; 10:00	Erić 9	(15–18)	Gioupi 10	Vícar Sports Hall, Vícar; Referees: Borrotti, Marcet (FRA)
25 June 2005; 10:00	4× (suspension)	Report	3× (yellow card) 3× (suspension)	Vícar Sports Hall, Vícar; Referees: Borrotti, Marcet (FRA)

25 June 2005; 18:00	Spain	40–38	Turkey	Vícar Sports Hall, Vícar; Referees: Zuhif, Al-Haj (SYR)
25 June 2005; 18:00	Guerola 12	(21–18)	İskenderoğlu 12	Vícar Sports Hall, Vícar; Referees: Zuhif, Al-Haj (SYR)
25 June 2005; 18:00	1× (yellow card) 11× (suspension)	Report	3× (yellow card) 7× (suspension) 1× (red card)	Vícar Sports Hall, Vícar; Referees: Zuhif, Al-Haj (SYR)

26 June 2005; 15:45	Serbia and Montenegro	43–40	Turkey	Vícar Sports Hall, Vícar; Referees: Požežnik, Repenšek (SLO)
26 June 2005; 15:45	Medved 13	(24–19)	Özel 12	Vícar Sports Hall, Vícar; Referees: Požežnik, Repenšek (SLO)
26 June 2005; 15:45	4× (yellow card) 8× (suspension)	Report	4× (yellow card) 5× (suspension)	Vícar Sports Hall, Vícar; Referees: Požežnik, Repenšek (SLO)

26 June 2005; 18:00	Spain	32–22	Greece	Vícar Sports Hall, Vícar; Referees: Jomhouri, Ben Fraj (TUN)
26 June 2005; 18:00	Alonso, Guerola 5	(15–10)	Gkolia, Gioupi 5	Vícar Sports Hall, Vícar; Referees: Jomhouri, Ben Fraj (TUN)
26 June 2005; 18:00	3× (yellow card) 7× (suspension) 1× (red card)	Report	3× (yellow card) 2× (suspension)	Vícar Sports Hall, Vícar; Referees: Jomhouri, Ben Fraj (TUN)

28 June 2005; 10:00	Turkey	35–30	Greece	Vícar Sports Hall, Vícar; Referees: Al-Haj, Zuhif (SYR)
28 June 2005; 10:00	Özel 10	(19–15)	Poimenidou 9	Vícar Sports Hall, Vícar; Referees: Al-Haj, Zuhif (SYR)
28 June 2005; 10:00	3× (yellow card) 3× (suspension)	Report	3× (yellow card) 2× (suspension)	Vícar Sports Hall, Vícar; Referees: Al-Haj, Zuhif (SYR)

28 June 2005; 18:00	Spain	26–21	Serbia and Montenegro	Vícar Sports Hall, Vícar; Referees: Ben Fraj, Jomhouri (TUN)
28 June 2005; 18:00	Mangué 5	(13–8)	Medved 7	Vícar Sports Hall, Vícar; Referees: Ben Fraj, Jomhouri (TUN)
28 June 2005; 18:00	3× (yellow card) 4× (suspension)	Report	4× (yellow card) 9× (suspension)	Vícar Sports Hall, Vícar; Referees: Ben Fraj, Jomhouri (TUN)

== Playoffs ==
=== Bracket ===
Semifinals
29 June
Spain	31
France	24
29 June
Croatia	33
Serbia and Montenegro	40

Gold medal
1 July
Spain	30
Serbia and Montenegro	29
Bronze medal
1 July
France	22
Croatia	26

=== Semifinals ===
29 June 2005; 10:30	Spain	31–24	France	Vícar Sports Hall, Vícar; Referees: Beňo, Rančík (SVK)
29 June 2005; 10:30	Aguilar 7	(16–9)	Kamto Njitam 9	Vícar Sports Hall, Vícar; Referees: Beňo, Rančík (SVK)
29 June 2005; 10:30	3× (yellow card) 5× (suspension)	Report	3× (yellow card) 2× (suspension)	Vícar Sports Hall, Vícar; Referees: Beňo, Rančík (SVK)

29 June 2005; 13:00	Croatia	33–40	Serbia and Montenegro	Vícar Sports Hall, Vícar; Referees: Muro, Rodríguez (ESP)
29 June 2005; 13:00	Pasičnik 9	(19–20)	Erić 9	Vícar Sports Hall, Vícar; Referees: Muro, Rodríguez (ESP)
29 June 2005; 13:00	3× (yellow card) 4× (suspension)	Report	2× (yellow card) 6× (suspension)	Vícar Sports Hall, Vícar; Referees: Muro, Rodríguez (ESP)

=== Seventh place game ===
30 June 2005; 10:30	Slovenia	41–32	Greece	Vícar Sports Hall, Vícar
30 June 2005; 10:30	Potočnik 16	(20–11)	Skoutela 9	Vícar Sports Hall, Vícar
30 June 2005; 10:30	4× (yellow card) 7× (suspension)	Report	3× (yellow card) 1× (suspension)	Vícar Sports Hall, Vícar

=== Fifth place game ===
30 June 2005; 13:00	Italy	33–39	Turkey	Vícar Sports Hall, Vícar; Referees: Marcet, Reveret (FRA)
30 June 2005; 13:00	Di Fazzio, Pistelli 9	(14–21)	Özel 13	Vícar Sports Hall, Vícar; Referees: Marcet, Reveret (FRA)
30 June 2005; 13:00	3× (yellow card) 2× (suspension)	Report	3× (yellow card) 4× (suspension)	Vícar Sports Hall, Vícar; Referees: Marcet, Reveret (FRA)

=== Bronze medal game ===
1 July 2005; 10:30	France	22–26	Croatia	Vícar Sports Hall, Vícar; Referees: Fernández, Permuy (ESP)
1 July 2005; 10:30	Spincer 8	(10–15)	Pasičnik 9	Vícar Sports Hall, Vícar; Referees: Fernández, Permuy (ESP)
1 July 2005; 10:30	3× (yellow card) 2× (suspension)	Report	2× (yellow card) 7× (suspension)	Vícar Sports Hall, Vícar; Referees: Fernández, Permuy (ESP)

=== Gold medal game ===
1 July 2005; 13:00	Spain	30–29	Serbia and Montenegro	Vícar Sports Hall, Vícar; Referees: Vukušić, Sarajlić (CRO)
1 July 2005; 13:00	Ortuño 8	(15–17)	Medved 7	Vícar Sports Hall, Vícar; Referees: Vukušić, Sarajlić (CRO)
1 July 2005; 13:00	3× (yellow card) 2× (suspension)	Report	3× (yellow card) 6× (suspension)	Vícar Sports Hall, Vícar; Referees: Vukušić, Sarajlić (CRO)

== Ranking and statistics ==
=== Final standings ===
Rank	Team
1st place, gold medalist(s)	Spain
2nd place, silver medalist(s)	Serbia and Montenegro
3rd place, bronze medalist(s)	Croatia
4	France
5	Turkey
6	Italy
7	Slovenia
8	Greece

=== Statistics ===
==== Top goalscorers ====
Rank	Name	Goals	Shots	%
1	(Serbia and Montenegro) Tatjana Medved	42	69	61
2	(Turkey) Yeliz Özel	40	64	63
3	(Slovenia) Nina Potočnik	37	57	65
4	(Italy) Luana Pistelli	33	49	67
5	(France) Angélique Spincer	32	48	67
6	(Croatia) Svitlana Pasičnik	31	45	69
7	(Turkey) Serpil İskenderoğlu	30	42	71
7	(Spain) Rocío Guerola	30	45	67
7	(Serbia and Montenegro) Jelena Erić	30	50	60
10	(Italy) Giorgia di Fazzio	29	53	55

Source: Almeria 2005

==== Top goalkeepers ====
Rank	Name	%	Saves	Shots
1	(Turkey) Sevilay İmamoğlu	39	54	150
2	(Spain) María Eugenia Sánchez	38	18	48
3	(Croatia) Ivana Jelčić	36	65	180
4	(Serbia and Montenegro) Sladjana Đerić	35	45	130
5	(Spain) Elisabeth López	32	42	132
6	(Italy) Lorena Bassi	31	43	137
6	(Slovenia) Urška Wertl	31	25	81
8	(France) Johana Bouveret	29	25	87
9	(France) Linda Pradel	28	33	117
10	(Serbia and Montenegro) Ana Vojčić	27	22	83

Source: Almeria 2005
