= Serbia and Montenegro at the 2005 Mediterranean Games =

- IOC code: SCG
- NOC: Olympic Committee of Serbia and Montenegro

in Almería
- Medals Ranked 10th: Gold 8 Silver 9 Bronze 14 Total 31

Mediterranean Games appearances (overview)
- 1997; 2001; 2005

Other related appearances
- Yugoslavia (1951–1991); Montenegro (2009–); Serbia (2009–); Kosovo (2018–)

Serbia and Montenegro (SCG) competed at the 2005 Mediterranean Games in Almería, Spain. The nation had a total number of 153 participants (108 men and 45 women) in the sports meet.

== Medals ==
=== Gold ===
Athletics

- Women's Discus Throw: Dragana Tomašević

Karate

- Women's – 60 kg: Snežana Perić

Judo

- Men's Half-Lightweight (– 66 kg): Miloš Mijalković

Shooting

- Women's Sport Pistol: Jasna Šekarić
- Men's 50m Rifle (three positions): Stevan Pletikosić

Table Tennis

- Men's Doubles: Slobodan Grujić and Aleksandar Karakašević
- Women's Doubles: Silvija Erdelji and Anamaria Erdelji

Wrestling

- Men's Greco-Roman (– 55 kg): Kristijan Fris

=== Silver ===
Athletics

- Women's 1.500 metres: Sonja Stolić

Boxing

- Men's Light Welterweight (– 64 kg): Milan Piperski

Handball

- Women's Team Competition: Marija Lojpur, Suzana Ćubela, Katarina Bulatović, Marijana Trbojević, Ana Vojčić, Marina Rokić, Jelena Erić, Svetlana Ognjenović, Jelena Nišavić, Ana Đokić, Jelena Popović, Mirjana Milenković, Ivana Milošević, Slađana Đerić, Dragica Kresoja, and Tatjana Medved.

Karate

- Men's – 80 kg: Miloš Živković
- Men's + 80 kg: Almir Cecunjanin

Rowing

- Men's Single Sculls: Nikola Stojić

Shooting

- Men's Air Rifle (10 metres): Nemanja Mirosavljev
- Men's small-bore Rifle (three positions): Nemanja Mirosavljev

Wrestling

- Men's Greco-Roman (– 60 kg): Davor Štefanek

=== Bronze ===
Athletics

- Women's 10.000 metres: Olivera Jevtić
- Women's Half Marathon: Olivera Jevtić

Boxing

- Men's Bantamweight (– 54 kg): Andrija Bogdanović
- Men's Middleweight (– 75 kg): Nikola Sjekloća
- Men's Super Heavyweight (+ 91 kg): Milan Vasiljević

Canoeing

- Men's K-2 (500m): Ognjen Filipović and Dragan Zorić

Judo

- Men's Heavyweight (+ 100 kg): Obren Božović
- Women's Middleweight (– 70 kg): Tamara Šešević

Shooting

- Women's Air Rifle (10 metres): Aranka Binder
- Men's Air Pistol (10 metres): Damir Mikec

Table Tennis

- Men's Singles: Slobodan Grujić

Volleyball

- Men's Team Competition: Milan Vasić, Vlado Petković, Novica Bjelica, Bojan Janić, Nikola Rosić, Ivica Jevtić, Mladen Majdak, Branimir Perić, Nikola Kovačević, Aleksandar Spirovski, Dejan Radić, and Nemanja Dukić

Water polo

- Men's Team Competition: Damjan Danilović, Nikola Vukčević, Miloš Korolija, Nikola Rađen, Vojislav Vejzagić, Draško Brguljan, Marko Ćuk, Filip Filipović, Aleksandar Ivović, Andrija Prlainović, Branislav Mitrović, Mlađan Janović, and Miloš Šćepanović

Wrestling

- Men's Greco-Roman (– 96 kg): Radomir Petković

== Medals by sport ==
Sport	Gold	Silver	Bronze	Total
Shooting	2	2	2	6
Table tennis	2	0	1	3
Karate	1	2	0	3
Athletics	1	1	2	4
Wrestling	1	1	1	3
Judo	1	0	2	3
Boxing	0	1	3	4
Handball	0	1	0	1
Rowing	0	1	0	1
Canoeing	0	0	1	1
Volleyball	0	0	1	1
Water polo	0	0	1	1
Totals (12 entries)	8	9	14	31

== See also ==
- Serbia and Montenegro at the 2004 Summer Olympics
- Serbia at the 2008 Summer Olympics
- Montenegro at the 2008 Summer Olympics
