= Janićijević =

Janićijević (Serbian Cyrillic: Јанићијевић) or Janicijevic is a Serbian family name.

Notable people with this name include:

- Dušan Janićijević (actor) (1932–2011), Serbian actor
- Dušan Janićijević (athlete) (born 1955), Serbian former long-distance runner
- Jovan Janićijević Burduš (1932–1992), Serbian actor
- Miloš Janićijević (born 1989), Serbian footballer
- Séléna Janicijevic (born 2000), French tennis player

== See also ==
- Janić
- Janič
