= Janić =

Janić is a surname. Notable people with the surname include:

- Adrienne Janic (born 1974), American actress and TV host of Serbian origin
- Mićo Janić (born 1979), Croatian sprint canoeist
- Milan Janić (1957–2003), Serbian sprint canoeist
- Saša Janić (born 1975), Croatian former football player
- Stjepan Janić (born 1980), Croatian sprint canoeist
- Vlado Janić (1904–1991), Croatian communist and partisan

== See also ==
- Janič
- Janjić
