= Handball at the 2005 Mediterranean Games =

The Handball Tournament at the 2005 Mediterranean Games was held in the Infanta Cristina Sports Hall and Vicar Sports Hall from Saturday 25 June to Saturday 2 July 2005 in Almería, Spain.

== Medal summary ==
=== Events ===
| Event | Gold | Silver | Bronze |
|---|---|---|---|
| Men | Spain Julen Aguinagalde; David Barrufet; Jon Belaustegui; David Davis; Raúl Entrerríos; Julio Fis; Rubén Garabaya; Juan García Lorenzana; Roberto García; Demetrio Lozano; Viran Morros; Mariano Ortega; Carlos Prieto; Albert Rocas; José María Rodríguez; José Manuel Sierra | Croatia Damir Bičanić; Nikola Blažičko; Denis Buntić; Josip Čale; Ivan Čupić; Zlatko Horvat; Tomislav Huljina; Krešimir Ivanković; Marin Knez; Branimir Koloper; Mario Obad; Vladimir Ostarčević; Ivan Pongračić; Vjenceslav Somić; Ljubo Vukić; Drago Vuković | Tunisia Makram Missaoui; Selim Hedoui ? Ben Abdallah; Mahmoud Gharbi; Issam Tej; Wissem Hmam; Ali Madi; Marouen Maggaiz; Marouen El Hadj Ahmed; Dhaker Seboui; Ouissem Bousnina; Sahbi Ben Aziza; Heykel Megannem; Anouar Ayed... |
| Women | Spain Macarena Aguilar; Patricia Alonso; Verónica Cuadrado; Aitziber Elejada; Begoña Fernández; Soraya García; Rocío Guerola; Elisabeth López; Marta Mangué; Carmen Martín; Beatriz Morales; Noelia Oncina; Isabel Ortuño; Susana Pareja; María Eugenia Sánchez; Yolanda Sanromán | Serbia and Montenegro Katarina Bulatović; Suzana Ćubela; Slađana Đerić; Ana Đokić; Jelena Erić; Dragica Kresoja; Marija Lojpur; Tatjana Medved; Mirjana Milenković; Ivana Milošević; Jelena Nišavić; Svetlana Ognjenović; Jelena Popović; Marina Rokić; Marijana Trbojević; Ana Vojčić | Croatia Maida Arslanagić; Maja Čop; Dijana Golubić; Jelena Grubišić; Lidija Horvat; Ivana Jelčić; Sanela Knezović; Maja Kožnjak; Svitlana Pasičnik; Andrea Penezić; Antonela Pensa; Nikica Pušić; Tihana Šarić; Sandra Stojković; Miranda Tatari; Maja Zebić |

=== Medal table ===
* Host nation (Spain)

| Rank | Nation | Gold | Silver | Bronze | Total |
|---|---|---|---|---|---|
| 1 | Spain* | 2 | 0 | 0 | 2 |
| 2 | Croatia | 0 | 1 | 1 | 2 |
| 3 | Serbia and Montenegro | 0 | 1 | 0 | 1 |
| 4 | Tunisia | 0 | 0 | 1 | 1 |
| Totals (4 entries) | | 2 | 2 | 2 | 6 |

== Men's tournament ==
=== Participating teams ===
- France
- Croatia
- Spain
- Greece
- Italy
- Slovenia
- Serbia & Montenegro
- Turkey
- Tunisia
- Egypt

=== Preliminary round ===
==== Group A ====
| Team | Pld | W | D | L | GF | GA | GD | Pts |
|---|---|---|---|---|---|---|---|---|
| Croatia | 1 | 1 | 0 | 0 | 24 | 22 | +2 | 2 |
| Egypt | 1 | 0 | 0 | 1 | 22 | 24 | −2 | 0 |

| 25 June 2005 | Croatia | 24 – 22 | Egypt |
| 25 June 2005 | | (12–11) |

==== Group B ====
| Team | Pld | W | D | L | GF | GA | GD | Pts |
|---|---|---|---|---|---|---|---|---|
| Spain | 1 | 1 | 0 | 0 | 38 | 29 | +9 | 2 |
| Greece | 1 | 0 | 0 | 1 | 29 | 38 | −9 | 0 |

| 27 June 2005 | Spain | 38 – 29 | Greece |
| 27 June 2005 | | (19–15) |

==== Group C ====
| Team | Pld | W | D | L | GF | GA | GD | Pts |
|---|---|---|---|---|---|---|---|---|
| Serbia & Montenegro | 2 | 2 | 0 | 0 | 61 | 51 | +10 | 4 |
| France | 2 | 1 | 0 | 1 | 57 | 50 | +7 | 2 |
| Turkey | 2 | 0 | 0 | 2 | 48 | 65 | −17 | 0 |

| 25 June 2005 | France | 32 – 22 | Turkey |
| 25 June 2005 | | (16–14) |

| 26 June 2005 | Serbia & Montenegro | 33 – 26 | Turkey |
| 26 June 2005 | | (15–13) |

| 27 June 2005 | Serbia & Montenegro | 28 – 25 | France |
| 27 June 2005 | | (13–13) |

==== Group D ====
| Team | Pld | W | D | L | GF | GA | GD | Pts |
|---|---|---|---|---|---|---|---|---|
| Tunisia | 2 | 2 | 0 | 0 | 60 | 50 | +10 | 4 |
| Slovenia | 2 | 1 | 0 | 1 | 53 | 52 | +1 | 2 |
| Italy | 2 | 0 | 0 | 2 | 54 | 65 | −11 | 0 |

| 25 June 2005 | Tunisia | 35 – 27 | Italy |
| 25 June 2005 | | (18–12) |

| 26 June 2005 | Slovenia | 30 – 27 | Italy |
| 26 June 2005 | | (13–13) |

| 27 June 2005 | Tunisia | 25 – 23 | Slovenia |
| 27 June 2005 | | (15–10) |

=== Final round ===
Quarter-finals
29 June
Tunisia | 29
France | 27
29 June
Egypt | 28
Spain | 32
29 June
Serbia & M | 33
Slovenia | 30
29 June
Croatia | 33
Greece | 25

Semi-finals
30 June
Tunisia | 27
Spain | 32
30 June
Serbia & M | 28
Croatia | 29

Final
2 July
Spain | 28
Croatia | 21
Third place
2 July
Tunisia | 32
Serbia & M | 26

==== Quarter-finals ====
| 29 June 2005 | Tunisia | 29 – 27 | France |
| 29 June 2005 | | (15–14) |

| 29 June 2005 | Spain | 32 – 28 | Egypt |
| 29 June 2005 | | (17–13) |

| 29 June 2005 | Serbia & Montenegro | 33 – 30 | Slovenia |
| 29 June 2005 | | (15–14) |

| 29 June 2005 | Croatia | 33 – 25 | Greece |
| 29 June 2005 | | (16–12) |

==== Semi-finals ====
| 30 June 2005 | Spain | 32 – 27 | Tunisia |
| 30 June 2005 | | (14–15) |

| 30 June 2005 | Croatia | 29 – 28 | Serbia & Montenegro |
| 30 June 2005 | | (18–12) |

==== Bronze-medal match ====
| 2 July 2005 | Tunisia | 32 – 26 | Serbia & Montenegro |
| 2 July 2005 | | (15–13) |

==== Gold-medal match ====
| 2 July 2005 | Spain | 28 – 21 | Croatia |
| 2 July 2005 | | (15–11) |

=== Final standings ===
| 1st place, gold medalist(s) | Spain |
| 2nd place, silver medalist(s) | Croatia |
| 3rd place, bronze medalist(s) | Tunisia |
| 4 | Serbia & Montenegro |
| 5 | Egypt |
| 6 | Slovenia |
| 7 | France |
| 8 | Greece |
| 9 | Italy |
| 10 | Turkey |
