= Sergeja Stefanišin =

Slovenian handball player

Personal information
- Nationality: Slovenian
- Born: 19 September 1974 (age 52) Ljubljana, SFR Yugoslavia
- Height: 184 cm (72 in)

Sport
- Sport: Handball
- Position: Goalkeeper
- Current club: Retired

Senior clubs
- Years: Team
- –: RK Krim
National team
Years	Team	Apps	(Gls)
–	Slovenia	212	(0)
Medal record
Women's handball
Representing Slovenia
Mediterranean Games
Silver medal – second place	2013 Mersin	Team competition
Bronze medal – third place	2001 Tunis	Team competition
Bronze medal – third place	1997 Bari	Team competition

Sergeja Stefanišin (born 19 September 1974) is a Slovenian former handball player who holds the record as the most capped player on the Slovenia women's national handball team, having played 212 matches for her country.
