= Yohann Ploquin =

French handball player (born 1978)

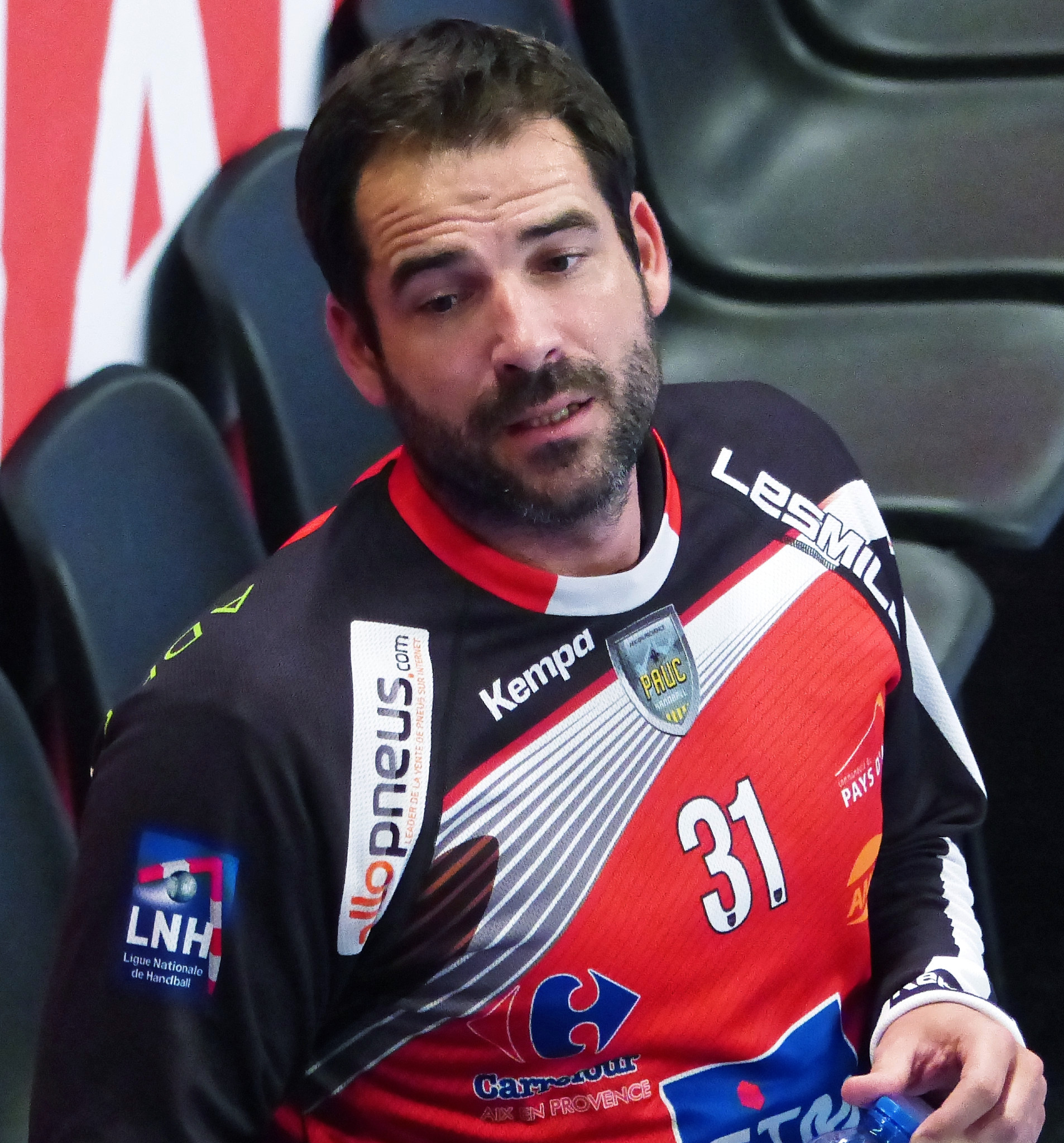
- Ploquin in 2014

Personal information
- Born: 31 May 1978 (age 48) La Rochelle, France
- Height: 192 cm (76 in)

Sport
- Sport: Handball

Youth career
- Years: Team
- 1990-1996: Aunis HB Périgny-La Rochelle

Senior clubs
- Years: Team
- 1996-1998: Girondins Bordeaux
- 1998-2008: Sporting Toulouse 31
- 2008: VfL Gummersbach
- 2008-2009: BM Aragón
- 2009-2013: Saint-Raphaël Var Handball
- 2013-: Pays d’Aix UC
National team
Years	Team	Apps	(Gls)
2001-	France	89	(0)
Medal record
Men's handball
Representing France
Mediterranean Games
Bronze medal – third place	2001 Tunis	Team competition

Yohann Ploquin (born 31 May 1978) is a French team handball player. He competed at the 2004 Summer Olympics in Athens, where the French team placed fifth.

== Personal life ==
Ploquin was born in La Rochelle on 31 May 1978.
