= Marie-Annick Dézert =

French handball player (1972–2019)

Personal information
- Born: 10 May 1972 Vire, France
- Died: 29 August 2019 (aged 47) Dijon, France

Sport
- Sport: Handball
- Position: Goalkeeper

Youth career
- Years: Team
- 1984-1986: Tinchebray
- 1986-1989: Vire

Senior clubs
- Years: Team
- 1989-1991: Dreux AC
- 1991-1994: Stade français Issy
- 1994-1996: Cercle Dijon Bourgogne
- 1996-1997: Stade Béthunois BL
- 1997-2003: Cercle Dijon Bourgogne
- 2003-2005: Toulon Saint-Cyr VHB
National team
Years	Team	Apps	(Gls)
1990-2001	France	?	(0)
Medal record
Women's handball
Representing France
Mediterranean Games
Gold medal – first place	2001 Tunis	Team competition
World Championship
Silver medal – second place	1999 Denmark/Norway	Team

Marie-Annick Dézert (10 May 1972 - 29 August 2019) was a French professional handball goalkeeper.

== Biography ==
Marie-Annick Dézert was born in Vire, France on 10 May 1972.

She played for the French national team from 1990 and 2001. She was vice-world champion in 1999.

In her club career, Dézert had worn the colors of Dreux AC for two seasons from 1989 to 1991, in National 1A. After the relegation of the team, she then moved to the Stade français Issy (1991-1994), before a long adventure at the Cercle Dijon Bourgogne from 1994 to 2003, only interrupted by a year at Béthune between 1996 and 1997. She retired in 2005, after two final seasons at Toulon Saint-Cyr VHB.

Marie-Annick Dézert died in Dijon on 29 August 2019.
