= Susana Fraile =

Spanish handball player (born 1978)

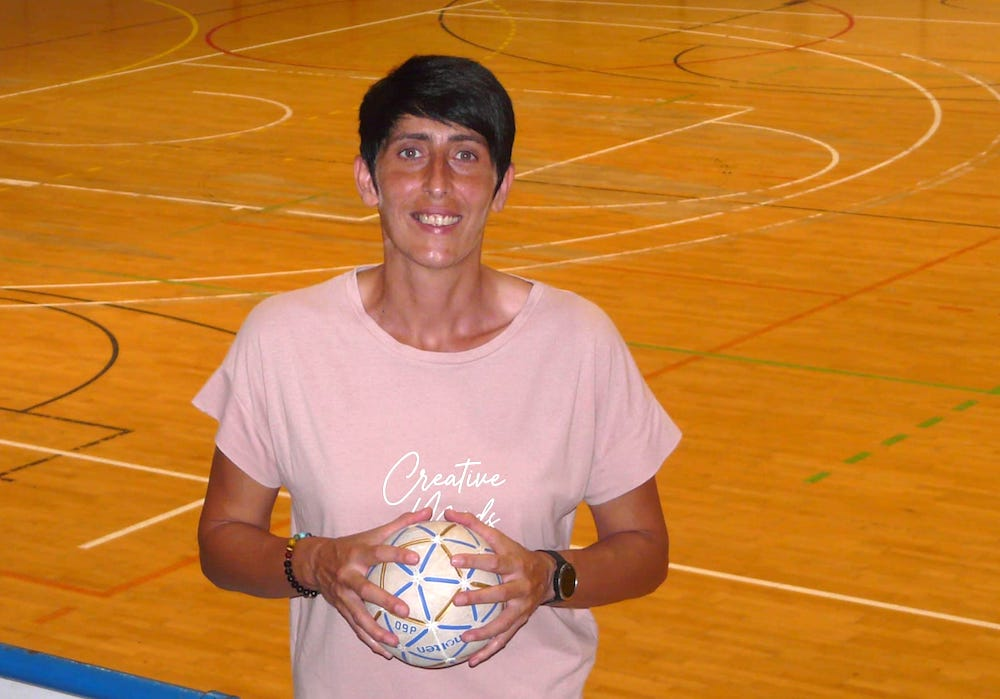

Personal information
- Full name: Susana Fraile Celaya
- Born: 4 July 1978 (age 48) Zumarraga, Gipuzkoa, Spain
- Height: 183 cm (72 in)

Sport
- Sport: Handball
- Position: Left back
National team
Years	Team	Apps	(Gls)
1998-2007	Spain	131	(411)
Medal record
Women's handball
Representing Spain
Mediterranean Games
Silver medal – second place	2001 Tunis	Team competition

Susana Fraile Celaya (born 4 July 1978) is a Spanish team handball player who played for CBF Elda and on the Spanish national team. She was born in Zumarraga. She competed at the 2004 Summer Olympics in Athens, where the Spanish team reached the quarter-finals, and placed sixth in the tournament.
