= Jesús Fernández (handballer, born 1974) =

Spanish handball player

Personal information
- Full name: Jesús Fernández Oceja
- Born: 25 February 1974 (age 52) Santander, Cantabria, Spain
- Height: 194 cm (76 in)

Sport
- Sport: Handball
Medal record
Men's handball
Representing Spain
Olympic Games
Bronze medal – third place	1996 Atlanta	Team
European Championships
Silver medal – second place	1996 Spain	Team
Mediterranean Games
Bronze medal – third place	1997 Bari	Team

Jesús Fernández Oceja (Note: In this Spanish name, the first or paternal surname is Fernández and the second or maternal family name is Oceja.) (born 25 February 1974) is a Spanish handball player who competed in the 1996 Summer Olympics.

He was born in Santander.

In 1996 he was a member of the Spanish handball team which won the bronze medal. He played two matches.
