= Arregui =

Arregui is a surname. Notable people with the surname include:

- Adrián Arregui (born 1992), Argentine footballer
- Antonio Arregui Yarza (1939–2026), Catholic Archbishop of Guayaquil, Ecuador
- Brian Arregui (born 2000), Argentine boxer
- Carolina Arregui (born 1965), Chilean television actress
- Celinda Arregui (1864–1941), Chilean feminist politician, writer, teacher, suffrage activist
- Facundo Arregui (born 1997), Argentine Paralympic swimmer
- Felipe Arregui (born 1994), Argentine rugby union player
- Joseba Arregui Aramburu (1946–2021), Spanish politician, theologian, and academic
- Juan de Arregui (1656–1736), Spanish Franciscan priest and Roman Catholic Bishop of Buenos Aires
- Olatz Arregui (born 1999), Spanish slalom canoeist
- Ricardo Arregui (born 1952), Spanish surgeon, frostbite specialist and former president of CAI Balonmano Aragón and Asobal Handball League
