= Ploquin =

Ploquin is a French surname with probable Occitan roots. Other variants are more common amongst French Canadians and include Péloquin and Poliquin. Notable people with the surname include:

- Raoul Ploquin (1900–1992), French film producer, production manager and screenwriter
- Yohann Ploquin (born 1978), French team handball player
