= Maite Andreu =

Spanish handball player (born 1971)

Personal information
- Full name: María Teresa Andreu Rodríguez
- Born: 26 January 1971 (age 55) Almoradí, Spain
- Height: 185 cm (73 in)

Sport
- Sport: Handball
- Position: Back
National team
- Years: Team
- –: Spain
Medal record
Women's handball
Representing Spain
Mediterranean Games
Silver medal – second place	2001 Tunis	Team competition

María Teresa Andreu Rodríguez (Note: In this Spanish name, the first or paternal surname is Andreu and the second or maternal family name is Rodríguez.) (born 26 January 1971 in Almoradí, Spain), known as Maite Andreu, is a Spanish handball player.

She competed at the 2004 Summer Olympics, where Spain finished 6th.

She was active from 1989 to 2006.
