= Lojpur =

Lojpur (Serbian Cyrillic: Лојпур) is a Serbian surname. Notable people with the surname include:

- Marija Lojpur (born 1983), Serbian handball player
- Mile Lojpur (1930–2005), Yugoslav and Serbian rock musician
