= Handball at the 1997 Mediterranean Games =

- Dates: 14 – 22 June 1997

Handball was contested at the 1997 Mediterranean Games in Bari.

== Medalists ==
Event	Gold	Silver	Bronze
Men	Croatia Silvio Ivandija; Goran Perkovac; Mario Bjeliš; Božidar Jović; Mladen Prskalo; Davor Dominiković; Mirza Džomba; Dragan Jerković; Neno Boban; Goran Jerković; Valner Franković; Valter Matošević	Italy Michael Niederwieser; Marcello Schmidt Ricci; Jürgen Prantner; Zaime Kobilica; Michele Guerrazzi; Alessandro Fusina; Settimio Massotti; Marcello Fonti; Corrado Bronzo; Alessandro Tarafino; Leonardo Lopasso; Maurizio Tabanelli	Spain José Javier Hombrados; David Rodríguez; Alberto Entrerríos; José Ángel Delgado; Mariano Ortega; Jesús Fernández; Juan Pedro Jiménez; Fernando Hernández; Alejandro Paredes; Vicente Alamo; Juancho Pérez; José Luis Pérez
Women	France Anne Loaec; Catherine Pibarot; Alexandra Castioni; Nodjialem Myaro; Véronique Pecqueux; Laëtitia Pierrot; Valérie Nicolas; Mézuela Servier; Isabelle Wendling; Nathalie Selambarom; Stéphanie Ludwig; Chantal Maïo	Croatia Irina Maljko; Klaudija Bubalo; Marija Čelina; Samira Hasagić; Renata Pavličić; Helena Lulić; Paula Glavaš; Nataša Kolega; Vlatka Mihoci; Renata Damjanić; Snježana Petika; Božica Gregurić	Slovenia Matejka Savicki; Nataša Mežek; Tatjana Polajner; Marjetka Marton; Sergeja Stefanišin; Darja Škopelja; Barbara Hudej; Deja Doler; Anja Frešer; Simona Šturm; Irma Kapidžič; Katja Kurent

== Men's Competition ==
=== Preliminary round ===
==== Group A ====
	Team	Points	G	W	D	L	GF	GA	Diff
1.	Spain	5	3	2	1	0	89	68	+21
2.	Slovenia	4	3	1	2	0	82	76	+6
3.	Turkey	3	3	1	1	1	74	74	0
4.	Bosnia and Herzegovina	0	3	0	0	3	70	97	–27

- June 16, 1997

Slovenia	31 – 25	Bosnia and Herzegovina
Spain	25 – 21	Turkey

- June 17, 1997

Slovenia	24 – 24	Turkey
Spain	37 – 20	Bosnia and Herzegovina

- June 18, 1997

Slovenia	27 – 27	Spain
Turkey	29 – 25	Bosnia and Herzegovina

==== Group B ====
	Team	Points	G	W	D	L	GF	GA	Diff
1.	(Federal Republic of Yugoslavia) FR Yugoslavia	4	2	2	0	0	51	33	+18
2.	Egypt	2	2	1	0	1	41	44	–3
3.	Morocco	0	2	0	0	2	32	47	–15

- June 16, 1997

Egypt	22 – 18	Morocco

- June 17, 1997

FR Yugoslavia (Federal Republic of Yugoslavia)	25 – 14	Morocco

- June 18, 1997

FR Yugoslavia (Federal Republic of Yugoslavia)	26 – 19	Egypt

==== Group C ====
	Team	Points	G	W	D	L	GF	GA	Diff
1.	Algeria	4	2	2	0	0	54	38	+16
2.	Croatia	2	2	1	0	1	48	48	0
3.	Greece	0	2	0	0	2	44	60	–16

- June 16, 1997

Croatia	30 – 24	Greece

- June 17, 1997

Algeria	30 – 20	Greece

- June 18, 1997

Algeria	24 – 18	Croatia

==== Group D ====
	Team	Points	G	W	D	L	GF	GA	Diff
1.	Tunisia	2	2	1	0	1	52	49	+3
2.	Italy	2	2	1	0	1	40	40	0
3.	France	2	2	1	0	1	46	49	–3

- June 16, 1997

Italy	21 – 16	France

- June 17, 1997

Tunisia	24 – 19	Italy

- June 18, 1997

France	30 – 28	Tunisia

=== Standing Games ===
==== For 5th to 8th rank ====
- June 21, 1997

FR Yugoslavia (Federal Republic of Yugoslavia)	28 – 27	Tunisia
Egypt	25 – 18	Algeria

==== For 9th to 12th rank ====
- June 20, 1997

Morocco	20 – 18	Greece
France	25 – 21	Turkey

- June 21, 1997

France	25 – 22	Morocco
Turkey	39 – 21	Greece

- June 22, 1997

Turkey	33 – 23	Morocco
France	30 – 25	Greece

	Team	Points	G	W	D	L	GF	GA	Diff
9.	France	6	3	3	0	0	80	68	+12
10.	Turkey	4	3	2	0	1	93	69	+24
11.	Morocco	2	3	1	0	2	65	76	–11
12.	Greece	0	3	0	0	3	64	89	–25

=== Final round ===
==== Quarter finals ====
- June 20, 1997

Slovenia	25 – 24	(Federal Republic of Yugoslavia) FR Yugoslavia
Spain	29 – 16	Egypt
Croatia	29 – 26	Tunisia
Italy	27 – 20	Algeria

==== Semi finals ====
- June 21, 1997

Italy	22 – 21	Spain
Croatia	23 – 21	Slovenia

==== Finals ====
- June 22, 1997 — Classification Match (7th/8th place)

Algeria	28 – 23	Tunisia

- June 22, 1997 — Classification Match (5th/6th place)

FR Yugoslavia (Federal Republic of Yugoslavia)	23 – 20	Egypt

- June 22, 1997 — Bronze Medal Match

Spain	31 – 27	Slovenia

- June 22, 1997 — Gold Medal Match

Croatia	21 – 20	Tunisia

=== Awards ===
1997 Men's Mediterranean Games champions

Croatia

=== Standings ===
Rank	Team
1st place, gold medalist(s)	Croatia
2nd place, silver medalist(s)	Italy
3rd place, bronze medalist(s)	Spain
4	Slovenia
5	(Federal Republic of Yugoslavia) FR Yugoslavia
6	Egypt
7	Algeria
8	Tunisia
9	France
10	Turkey
11	Morocco
12	Greece
13	Bosnia and Herzegovina

== Women's Competition ==
=== Preliminary round ===
==== Group A ====
	Team	Points	G	W	D	L	GF	GA	Diff
1.	Croatia	5	3	2	1	0	76	52	+24
2.	Slovenia	5	3	2	1	0	84	68	+16
3.	Turkey	2	3	1	0	2	58	76	–18
4.	Italy	0	3	0	0	3	52	74	–22

- June 14, 1997

Slovenia	31 – 23	Turkey
Croatia	25 – 13	Italy

- June 15, 1997

Croatia	28 – 16	Turkey
Slovenia	30 – 22	Italy

- June 16, 1997

Turkey	19 – 17	Italy
Slovenia	23 – 23	Croatia

==== Group B ====
	Team	Points	G	W	D	L	GF	GA	Diff
1.	France	7	3	2	1	0	72	54	+18
2.	(Federal Republic of Yugoslavia) FR Yugoslavia	6	3	2	0	1	67	66	+1
3.	Spain	3	3	1	1	1	70	58	+12
4.	Algeria	0	3	0	0	3	54	85	–31

- June 14, 1997

France	21 – 21	Spain
FR Yugoslavia (Federal Republic of Yugoslavia)	27 – 24	Algeria

- June 15, 1997

FR Yugoslavia (Federal Republic of Yugoslavia)	19 – 16	Spain
France	25 – 12	Algeria

- June 16, 1997

France	26 – 21	(Federal Republic of Yugoslavia) FR Yugoslavia
Spain	33 – 18	Algeria

==== Semi finals ====
- June 18, 1997

France	26 – 24	Slovenia
Croatia	22 – 20	(Federal Republic of Yugoslavia) FR Yugoslavia

==== Finals ====
- June 19, 1997 — Classification Match (7th/8th place)

Italy	18 – 17	Algeria

- June 19, 1997 — Classification Match (5th/6th place)

Spain	24 – 20	Turkey

- June 20, 1997 — Bronze Medal Match

Slovenia	27 – 19	(Federal Republic of Yugoslavia) FR Yugoslavia

- June 20, 1997 — Gold Medal Match

France	23 – 22	Croatia

=== Awards ===
1997 Women's Mediterranean Games champions

France

=== Standings ===
Rank	Team
1st place, gold medalist(s)	France
2nd place, silver medalist(s)	Croatia
3rd place, bronze medalist(s)	Slovenia
4	FR Yugoslavia
5	Spain
6	Turkey
7	Italy
8	Algeria
