= Diana Box =

Spanish handball player (born 1971)

Personal information
- Full name: Diana Box Alonso
- Nationality: Spanish
- Born: 6 March 1971 (age 55) Annecy-le-Vieux, Haute-Savoie, France
- Height: 172 cm (68 in)

Sport
- Sport: Handball
- Position: Pivot
National team
Years	Team	Apps	(Gls)
1997-?	Spain	102	(124)
Medal record
Women's handball
Representing Spain
Mediterranean Games
Silver medal – second place	2001 Tunis	Team competition

Diana Box Alonso (born 6 March 1971) is a Spanish team handball player who played for the club CBF Elda and on the Spanish national team. She was born in Haute-Savoie, France. She competed at the 2004 Summer Olympics in Athens, where the Spanish team reached the quarter-finals.
