= Anja Frešer =

Slovenian handball player (born 1974)

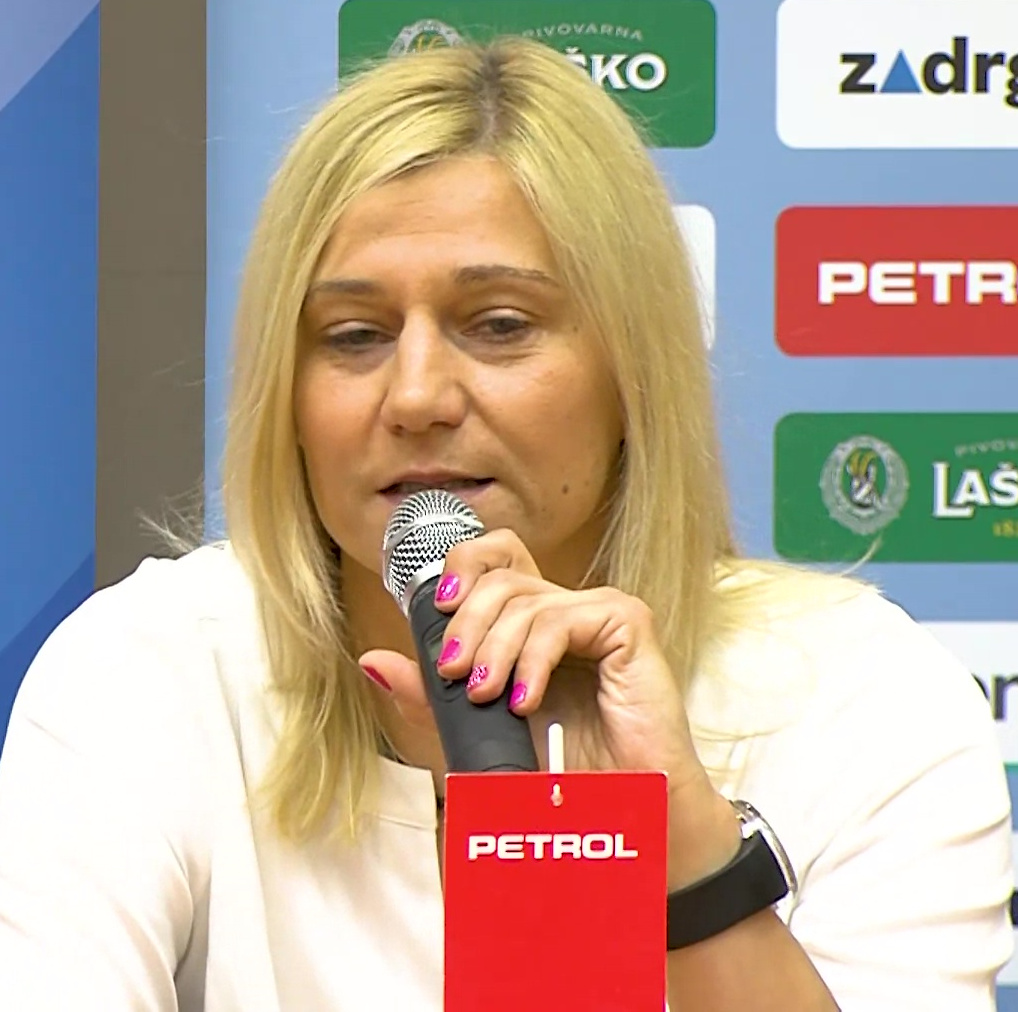
- Frešer in 2017

Personal information
- Born: 4 September 1974 (age 52) Maribor, Slovenia
- Height: 1.82 m (6 ft 0 in)

Sport
- Sport: Handball
- Position: Right back
- Current club: Retired

Senior clubs
- Years: Team
- 1997-2000: RK Olimpija
- 2000-2003: RK Krim
- 2003-2004: Slagelse DT
- 2004-2009: RK Krim
- 2009-2010: AC Loux Patras
- 2010-2011: Maliye Milli Pyango SK
National team
Years	Team	Apps	(Gls)
–	Slovenia	143	(531)
Medal record
Women's handball
Representing Slovenia
Mediterranean Games
Bronze medal – third place	1997 Bari	Team competition
Bronze medal – third place	2001 Tunis	Team competition

Anja Frešer (born 4 September 1974 in Maribor, Slovenia) is a former Slovenian handball player.
