= Veroljub Kosovac =

Serbian handball coach (born 1956)

Personal information
- Nationality: Serbian
- Born: 5 January 1956 (age 70) Vrnjačka Banja, Yugoslavia

Sport
- Sport: Handball
- Position: Goalkeeper

Senior clubs
- Years: Team
- –1984: Crvena zvezda
- 1984–1986: FC Barcelona
- 1986–1994: IFK Kristianstad

Teams managed
- 1991–1994: IFK Kristianstad
- 1994–1997: IFK Trelleborg
- 1997–1998: IFK Ystad
- 1999–2005: H43 Lund
- 2005–2009: BM Aragón
- 2009–2011: Skjern Håndbold
- 2012–2013: H43 Lund
- 2013–: Qatar (assistant)

Veroljub Kosovac (born 5 January 1956) is a Serbian handball coach and former player who played as a goalkeeper.

== Playing career ==
Kosovac started his career at Belgrade-based Crvena zvezda. In 1984 he moved to Spanish club FC Barcelona, helping them win the Cup Winners' Cup in 1984–85 and 1985–86. He moved to Swedish second-tier club IFK Kristianstad in 1986 and helped them reach promotion to the top division in 1989–90 and 1991–92. He became player-coach for the club in 1991, remaining in that position until 1994.

== Coaching career ==
Upon leaving Kristianstad in 1994, Kosovac became coach for Swedish club IFK Trelleborg. He stayed there until 1997 when he moved to Swedish top-flight club IFK Ystad, which he coached for a single season. In 1999 he joined H43 Lund, helping them achieve promotion to the top division in 1999–2000. He left H43 for Spanish club BM Aragón in 2005. He coached the team to the EHF Cup final in 2006–07. He moved to Danish club Skjern Håndbold in 2009, but his contract was terminated in December 2011. He returned to H43 in 2012 and coached them for a single season, again leading them to promotion to the top division. Since 2013 he has been assistant coach and goalkeeper coach for the Qatar national team. He helped them reach the 2015 World Championship final as hosts.
