= Maja Vojnovič =

Slovenian handball player

Personal information
- Nationality: Slovenian
- Born: 26 January 1998 (age 28) Novo Mesto, Slovenia
- Height: 1.80 m (5 ft 11 in)

Sport
- Sport: Handball
- Position: Goalkeeper
- Current club: RK Krim
- Number: 16

Senior clubs
- Years: Team
- 2013–2018: ŽRK Krka
- 2018–2021: RK Krim
- 2021–2022: Siófok KC
- 2022–2023: Saint-Amand Handball
- 2023–: RK Krim
National team
Years	Team	Apps	(Gls)
2017–	Slovenia	100	(9)
- Updated on 11 November 2026

Maja Vojnovič (born 26 January 1998) is a Slovenian handball player who plays for RK Krim and the Slovenia national team.

She represented Slovenia at the 2017 World Women's Handball Championship and at the 2022 European Women's Handball Championship.
