= Vladimir Ostarčević =

Croatian handball player (born 1982)

Personal information
- Nationality: Croatian
- Born: 22 April 1982 (age 44) Karlovac, Croatia
- Height: 1.85 m (6 ft 1 in)

Sport
- Sport: Handball
- Position: Centre back
- Current club: HRK Karlovac
- Number: 27

Youth career
- Years: Team
- 1996-1999: HRK Karlovac

Senior clubs
- Years: Team
- 1999-2001: HRK Karlovac
- 2001-2002: RK Badel 1862 Zagreb
- 2002: RD Slovan Ljubljana
- 2002-2004: RK Zamet Crotek Rijeka
- 2004-2005: RK Metković
- 2005-2006: RK Agram Medveščak Zagreb
- 2007-2008: BM Antequera
- 2008-2010: RD Riko Ribnica
- 2010-2012: Sélestat Alsace Handball
- 2012-2014: Tremblay-en-France Handball
- 2014-2015: Entente Strasbourg Schiltigheim Alsace Handball
- 2015-2016: Martigues Handball
- 2017-: HRK Karlovac
National team
Years	Team	
2000-2001	Croatia U-21	
2001-2005	Croatia	30
Medal record
Representing Croatia
Men's Handball
Mediterranean Games
Silver medal – second place	2005 Almería	Team

Vladimir Ostarčević (born 22 April 1982) is a Croatian handballer, who played as a centre back in HRK Karlovac.

Ostarčević played for Croatia U-21 team at the IHF Men's Junior World Championship in 2003. He made 30 appearances for Croatia and played at the 2005 Mediterranean Games where they won a silver medal.

He has played for clubs from Croatia, Slovenia, Spain and France.

== Honours ==
RK Zagreb

- Croatian First League (1): 2001-02
