= Kresoja =

Kresoja is a surname found in Croatia and Serbia. Notable people with the surname include:

- Robert Kresoja (1970), Croatian volleyball coach
- Franko Kresoja (1940–2014), Croatian basketball player
- Dragan Kresoja (1946–1996), Serbian film director
- Dragica Kresoja (born 1986), Macedonian handball player of Serbian origin
