= Mirjana Milenković =

Montenegrin handball player (born 1985)

Personal information
- Nationality: Montenegrin
- Born: 14 March 1985 (age 41) Kruševac, SR Serbia, SFR Yugoslavia
- Height: 1.83 m (6 ft 0 in)

Sport
- Sport: Handball
- Position: Goalkeeper

Senior clubs
- Years: Team
- 2000–2003: ŽRK Radnički Belgrade
- 2003–2007: ŽRK Knjaz Miloš
- 2007–2009: ŽRK Budućnost
- 2009–2011: ŽRK Biseri
- 2011–2012: SD Itxako
- 2012–2013: ESBF Besançon
- 2013–2016: RK Podravka Koprivnica
- 2016–2017: Neckarsulmer Sport-Union
National team
Years	Team		
–2006	Serbia and Montenegro		
2006–	Montenegro	60	(0)

Teams managed
- 2021–: Montenegro (goalkeeping coach)
Medal record
Representing Serbia and Montenegro
Mediterranean Games
Silver medal – second place	2005 Almería	Team
Representing Montenegro
Mediterranean Games
Bronze medal – third place	2009 Pescara	Team

Mirjana Milenković (born 14 March 1985) is a former Montenegrin handball goalkeeper who plays for the Montenegrin national team.

== Club career ==
Milenković started to play handball in Serbian club Radnički from Belgrade. In 2003, she joined Knjaz Miloš. In 2006, she joined Budućnost. In 2007 Milenković won Serbian Championship trophy and in 2008 and 2009 two Montenegrin Championship and Montenegrin Cup trophies.

From season 2011/2012 Milenković is playing for 2011 Spanish champions and EHF Champions League runners-up SD Itxako.

== Trophies ==
- Croatian Championship
  - Gold: 2015, 2016
- Croatian Cup
  - Gold: 2015, 2016
- Spanish Supercup
  - Gold: 2011/2012
- Women's Regional Handball League
  - Silver: 2008/2009
- Montenegrin Championship
  - Gold: 2007/2008 and 2008/2009
  - Silver: 2009/2010 and 2010/2011
- Montenegrin Cup
  - Gold: 2007/2008 and 2008/2009
  - Silver: 2009/2010 and 2010/2011
- Serbian Championship
  - Gold: 2006/2007
