= Elisabeth López =

Spanish handball player (born 1975)

Personal information
- Full name: Elisabeth López Valledor
- Nationality: Spanish
- Born: 27 January 1975 (age 51) Paris, France
- Height: 179 cm (70 in)

Sport
- Sport: Handball
- Position: Goalkeeper
- Current club: retired
National team
Years	Team	Apps	(Gls)
2001-2009	Spain	171	(4)
Medal record
Women's handball
Representing Spain
Mediterranean Games
Gold medal – first place	2005 Almería	Team competition
Silver medal – second place	2001 Tunis	Team competition

Elisabeth López Valledor (born 27 January 1975) is a Spanish team handball player who played for the club BM Sagunto and on the Spanish national team. She was born in Paris, France. She competed at the 2004 Summer Olympics in Athens, where the Spanish team reached the quarter finals.
