= Mohamed Riadh Sanaa =

Tunisian handball player

Personal information
- Nationality: Tunisian
- Born: 13 May 1965 (age 61)
- Height: 194 cm (6 ft 4 in)
- Weight: 98 kg (216 lb)

Sport
- Sport: Handball
Medal record
Men's handball
Representing Tunisia
Mediterranean Games
Silver medal – second place	2001 Tunis	Team competition

Mohamed Riadh Sanaa (born 13 May 1965) is a Tunisian handball player. He competed in the men's tournament at the 2000 Summer Olympics.
