= Oualid Ben Amor =

Tunisian handball player

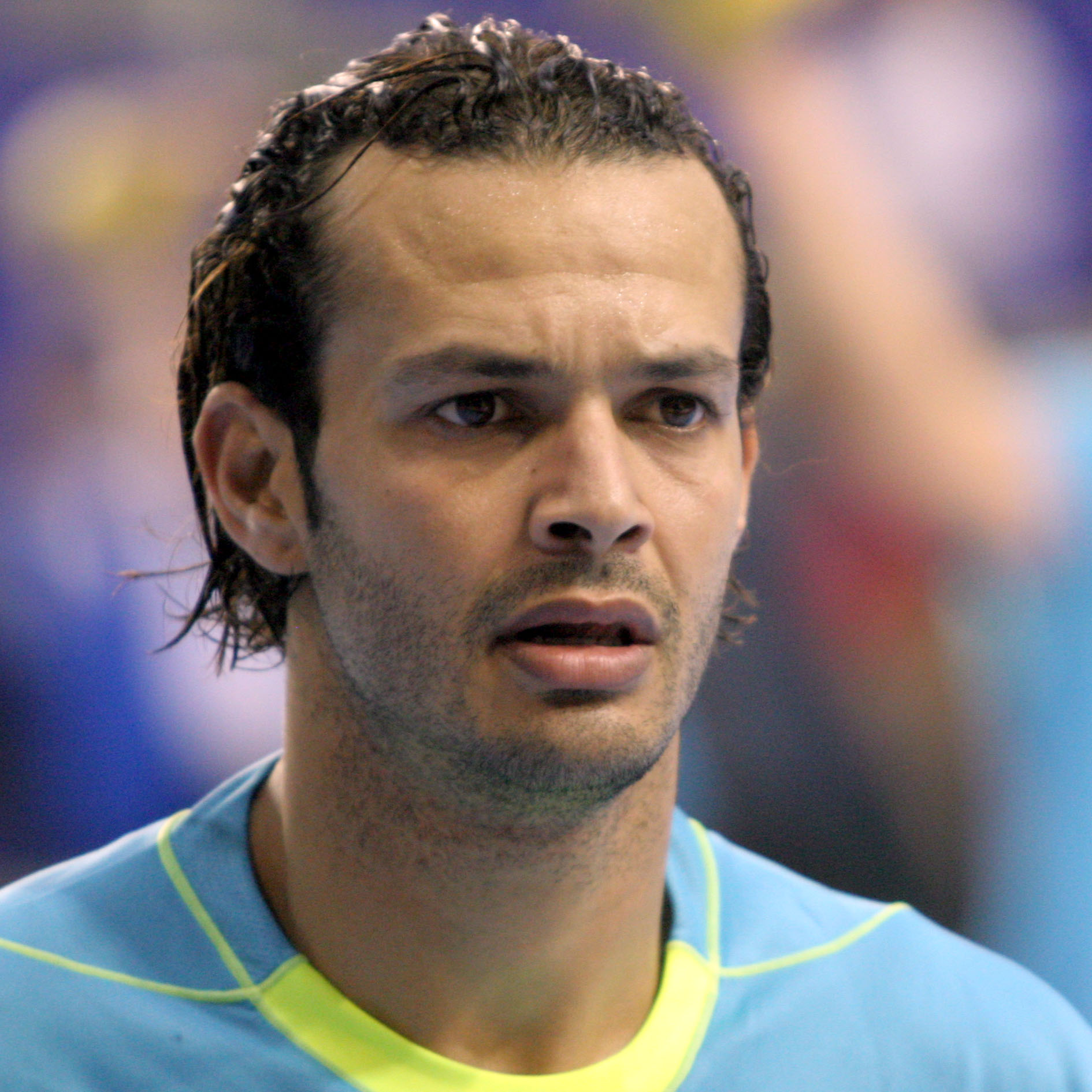
- Oualid Ben Amor in 2008

Personal information
- Nationality: Tunisian
- Born: 24 May 1976 (age 50) Monastir, Tunisia
- Height: 190 cm (75 in)

Sport
- Sport: Handball
- Position: Centre back

Senior clubs
- Years: Team
- -1995: Sporting Club de Moknine
- 1995-2000: Club Africain
- 2000-2001: BM Ciudad Real
- 2001-2008: Teka Cantabria
- 2008-2009: FC Barcelona
- 2009-2013: Al-Jazeera
National team
| Years | Team | Apps | (Gls) |
| – | Tunisia | 167 | (129) |
Medal record
Men's handball
Representing Tunisia
Mediterranean Games
| Silver medal – second place | 2001 Tunis | Team competition |
African Championship
| Gold medal – first place | 1998 South Africa |
| Gold medal – first place | 2002 Morocco |
| Silver medal – second place | 2004 Egypt |
| Gold medal – first place | 2008 Angola |

Oualid Ben Amor (born 24 May 1976) is a Tunisian handball player and coach. He competed in the men's tournament at the 2000 Summer Olympics.
