= Ivan Pongračić =

Croatian handball player (born 1980)

Personal information
- Nationality: Croatian
- Born: 8 March 1980 (age 46) Đakovo, Croatia
- Height: 1.84 m (6 ft 0 in)

Sport
- Sport: Handball
- Position: Left wing
- Current club: Retired
- Number: 21

Senior clubs
- Years: Team
- 1997-1999: RK Cetera Đakovo
- 1999-2003: RK Brodokumer Split
- 2003-2004: RK Zamet Crotek
- 2004-2006: RK Zagreb
- 2006-2008: RK Osijek Elektromodul
- 2008-2009: RD Riko Ribnica Hiše
- 2009-2010: RK Kolubara
- 2010-2012: RK Spačva Vinkovci
- 2012-2014: RK Đakovo
- 2014-2016: Tiller Handball
National team
| Years | Team | Apps | (Gls) |
| 2002-2007 | Croatia | 30 | (89) |
Medal record
Mediterranean Games
| Silver medal – second place | 2005 Almería | Team |

Ivan Pongračić (born 8 March 1980) is a Croatian handball player and former Croatian national team.

== Honours ==
Zagreb

- Croatian First League
  - Winner (2): 2004–05, 2005–06
- Croatian Cup
  - Winner (2): 2005, 2006
- EHF Cup Winners' Cup
  - Finalist (1): 2005

Osijek Elektromodul

- Croatian First League
  - Runner up (1): 2006–07

Kolubara

- Serbian Super League
  - Winner (1): 2009–10
- Serbian Cup
  - Winner (1): 2010
