= Handball at the 2001 Mediterranean Games =

Handball was contested at the 2001 Mediterranean Games in El Menzah and Ariana.

== Medalists ==
Event	Gold	Silver	Bronze
Men	Croatia Ivano Balic; Tihomir Baltic; Davor Dominikovic; Mirza Dzomba; Slavko Goluza; Bozidar Jovic; Mario Kelentric; Igor Kos; Blazenko Lackovic; Valter Matosevic; Petar Metlicic; Diego Modrusan; Goran Sprem; Renato Sulic; Vedran Zrnic; Zvonimir Bilic	Tunisia Riadh Sanaa; Moez Bahri; Iteb Bouali; Walid Ben Amor; Sobhi Sioud; Sahbi Ben Aziza; Wissem Hmam; Heykel Megannem; Wissem Bousnina; Mohamed Messaoudi; Zouhair Ben Messaoud; Anouar Ayed; Issam Tej; Ali Madi; Makram Jerou; Dhaker Seboui	France Thierry Omeyer; Jerome Fernandez; Didier Dinart; Cedric Burdet; Guillaume Gille; Bertrand Gille; Daniel Narcisse; Andrej Golic; Olivier Girault; Laurent Puigsegur; Jackson Richardson; Stephane Plantin; Christophe Kempe; Yohann Ploquin; Mickael Grossman; Nicolas Lemmonne
Women	France Valerie Nicolas; Marie Annick Dezert; Joanne Dudziak; Sonia Cendier; Leila Lejeune-Duchemann; Stephanie Norval-Tabard; Myriam Korfanty; Nodjialem Myaro; Stephanie Moreau; Mezuela Servier-Prandi; Stephanie Cano; Isabelle Wendling; Chantal Maio-Roussel; Stephanie Ludwig; Nathalie Selambarom; Seynabou Benga	Spain Aitziber Elejaga Vargas; Elizabeth Lopez Valledor; Cristina E. Lopez Quiros; Anna Voytsekhoyska; Ana Isabel Ruiz Perez; Diana Box Alonso; Maria Teresa Andreu Rodriguez; Cristina Gomez Arquer; Noelia Oncina Moreno; Tatiana Garmendia Lopez; Montserrat Puche Diaz; Susana Fraile Celaya; Silvia Del Olmo Escudero; Izaskun Mugica Zozaya; Veronica Cuadrado Dehesa; Patricia Alonso Jimenez	Slovenia Nada Tutnjic; Mira Vincic; Sergeja Stefanisin; Vesna Vincic; Nadiza Plesko; Spela Cerar; Tanja Dajcman; Mojca Dercar; Deja Doler; Inna Dolgun; Sonja Durkovic; Anja Freser; Barbara Gorski; Silvana Ilic; Branka Mijatovic; Tatjana Oder

== Men's Competition ==
=== Preliminary round ===
==== Group A ====
	Team	Points	G	W	D	L	GF	GA	Diff
1.	France	4	2	2	0	0	52	29	+23
2.	Spain	2	2	1	0	1	45	43	+2
3.	Greece	0	2	0	0	2	33	58	–25

- September 8, 2001

Spain	28 – 21	Greece

- September 9, 2001

France	30 – 12	Greece

- September 10, 2001

France	22 – 17	Spain

==== Group B ====
	Team	Points	G	W	D	L	GF	GA	Diff
1.	Slovenia	3	2	1	1	0	63	52	+11
2.	(Federal Republic of Yugoslavia) FR Yugoslavia	3	2	1	1	0	57	49	+8
3.	Morocco	0	2	0	0	2	53	72	–19

- September 8, 2001

Slovenia	39 – 28	Morocco

- September 9, 2001

FR Yugoslavia (Federal Republic of Yugoslavia)	33 – 25	Morocco

- September 10, 2001

FR Yugoslavia (Federal Republic of Yugoslavia)	24 – 24	Slovenia

==== Group C ====
	Team	Points	G	W	D	L	GF	GA	Diff
1.	Croatia	4	2	2	0	0	60	52	+8
2.	Algeria	2	2	1	0	1	58	49	+9
3.	Turkey	0	2	0	0	2	53	70	–17

- September 8, 2001

Croatia	35 – 29	Turkey

- September 9, 2001

Algeria	35 – 24	Turkey

- September 10, 2001

Croatia	25 – 23	Algeria

==== Group D ====
	Team	Points	G	W	D	L	GF	GA	Diff
1.	Tunisia	4	2	2	0	0	57	44	+17
2.	Italy	2	2	1	0	1	52	54	–2
3.	Syria	0	2	0	0	2	48	59	–11

- September 8, 2001

Italy	30 – 26	Syria

- September 9, 2001

Tunisia	29 – 22	Syria

- September 10, 2001

Tunisia	28 – 22	Italy

=== Standing Games ===
==== For 5th to 8th rank ====
FR Yugoslavia played with Slovenia in the match for 5th place, while Italy played with Algeria in the match for 7th place.

- September 14, 2001

FR Yugoslavia (Federal Republic of Yugoslavia)	33 – 26	Slovenia

Algeria	27 – 24	Italy

==== For 9th to 12th rank ====
- September 11, 2001

Greece	32 – 31	Morocco
Turkey	30 – 28	Syria

After the first classement match, Syria withdrew from the tournament. The ranking was based on the results of the tournament between the three participating countries: Morocco, Greece and Turkey.

- September 12, 2001

Morocco	34 – 32	Turkey

- September 13, 2001

Greece	30 – 23	Turkey

	Team	Points	G	W	D	L	GF	GA	Diff
9.	Greece	4	2	2	0	0	62	54	+8
10.	Morocco	2	2	1	0	1	65	64	+1
11.	Turkey	0	2	0	0	2	55	64	–9
12.	Syria	-	-	-	-	-	-	-	-

=== Final round ===
==== Quarter finals ====
- September 12, 2001

France	26 – 20	(Federal Republic of Yugoslavia) FR Yugoslavia
Croatia	32 – 25	Italy
Spain	32 – 25	Slovenia
Tunisia	27 – 19	Algeria

==== Semi finals ====
- September 13, 2001

Croatia	32 – 26	France
Tunisia	28 – 27	Spain

==== Finals ====
- September 14, 2001 — Bronze Medal Match

France	22 – 21	Spain

- September 14, 2001 — Gold Medal Match

Croatia	24 – 23	Tunisia

=== Awards ===
2001 Men's Mediterranean Games champions

Croatia

=== Standings ===
Rank	Team
1st place, gold medalist(s)	Croatia
2nd place, silver medalist(s)	Tunisia
3rd place, bronze medalist(s)	France
4	Spain
5	(Federal Republic of Yugoslavia) FR Yugoslavia
6	Slovenia
7	Algeria
8	Italy
9	Greece
10	Morocco
11	Turkey
12	Syria

== Women's Competition ==
=== Preliminary round ===
==== Group A ====
	Team	Points	G	W	D	L	GF	GA	Diff
1.	Spain	3	2	1	1	0	61	40	+21
2.	France	3	2	1	1	0	51	40	+11
3.	Italy	0	2	0	0	2	34	66	–32
4.	Algeria	-	-	-	-	-	-	-	−

Algeria withdrew from the competition.

- September 6, 2001

France	28 – 17	Italy

- September 7, 2001

Spain	38 – 17	Italy

- September 8, 2001

France	23 – 23	Spain

==== Group B ====
	Team	Points	G	W	D	L	GF	GA	Diff
1.	Slovenia	7	4	3	1	0	135	101	+34
2.	(Federal Republic of Yugoslavia) FR Yugoslavia	5	4	2	1	1	133	120	+13
3.	Turkey	5	4	2	1	1	131	108	+23
4.	Tunisia	2	4	0	2	2	96	112	–16
5.	Greece	1	4	0	1	3	89	143	–54

- September 6, 2001

Slovenia	31 – 26	Tunisia
Turkey	33 – 20	Greece

- September 7, 2001

Slovenia	27 – 27	Turkey
FR Yugoslavia (Federal Republic of Yugoslavia)	23 – 23	Tunisia

- September 8, 2001

Turkey	36 – 25	Tunisia
FR Yugoslavia (Federal Republic of Yugoslavia)	47 – 26	Greece

- September 9, 2001

FR Yugoslavia (Federal Republic of Yugoslavia)	36 – 35	Turkey
Slovenia	41 – 21	Greece

- September 10, 2001

Slovenia	36 – 27	(Federal Republic of Yugoslavia) FR Yugoslavia
Tunisia	22 – 22	Greece

=== Final round ===
==== Semi finals ====
- September 11, 2001

France	23 – 16	Slovenia
Spain	25 – 24	(Federal Republic of Yugoslavia) FR Yugoslavia

==== Finals ====
- September 11, 2001 — Classification Match (5th/6th place)

Turkey	31 – 30	Italy

- September 12, 2001 — Bronze Medal Match

Slovenia	32 – 26	(Federal Republic of Yugoslavia) FR Yugoslavia

- September 12, 2001 — Gold Medal Match

France	26 – 21	Spain

=== Standings ===
Rank	Team
1st place, gold medalist(s)	France
2nd place, silver medalist(s)	Spain
3rd place, bronze medalist(s)	Slovenia
4	FR Yugoslavia
5	Turkey
6	Italy
7	Tunisia
8	Greece
