= Makrem Jerou =

Tunisian handball player

Personal information
- Nationality: Tunisian
- Born: 14 May 1976 (age 50)
- Height: 187 cm (6 ft 2 in)
- Weight: 91 kg (201 lb)

Sport
- Sport: Handball
Medal record
Men's handball
Representing Tunisia
Mediterranean Games
Silver medal – second place	2001 Tunis	Team competition

Makrem Jerou (born 14 May 1976) is a Tunisian handball player. He competed in the men's tournament at the 2000 Summer Olympics.
