= Mohamed Messaoudi =

Tunisian handball player

Personal information
- Nationality: Tunisian
- Born: 14 March 1973 (age 53)
- Height: 187 cm (6 ft 2 in)
- Weight: 84 kg (185 lb)

Sport
- Sport: Handball
Medal record
Men's handball
Representing Tunisia
Mediterranean Games
Silver medal – second place	2001 Tunis	Team competition

Mohamed Messaoudi (born 14 March 1973) is a Tunisian handball player. He competed in the men's tournament at the 2000 Summer Olympics. He played his entire club career for Club africain in his home country.
