= Krešimir Ivanković =

Croatian handball player

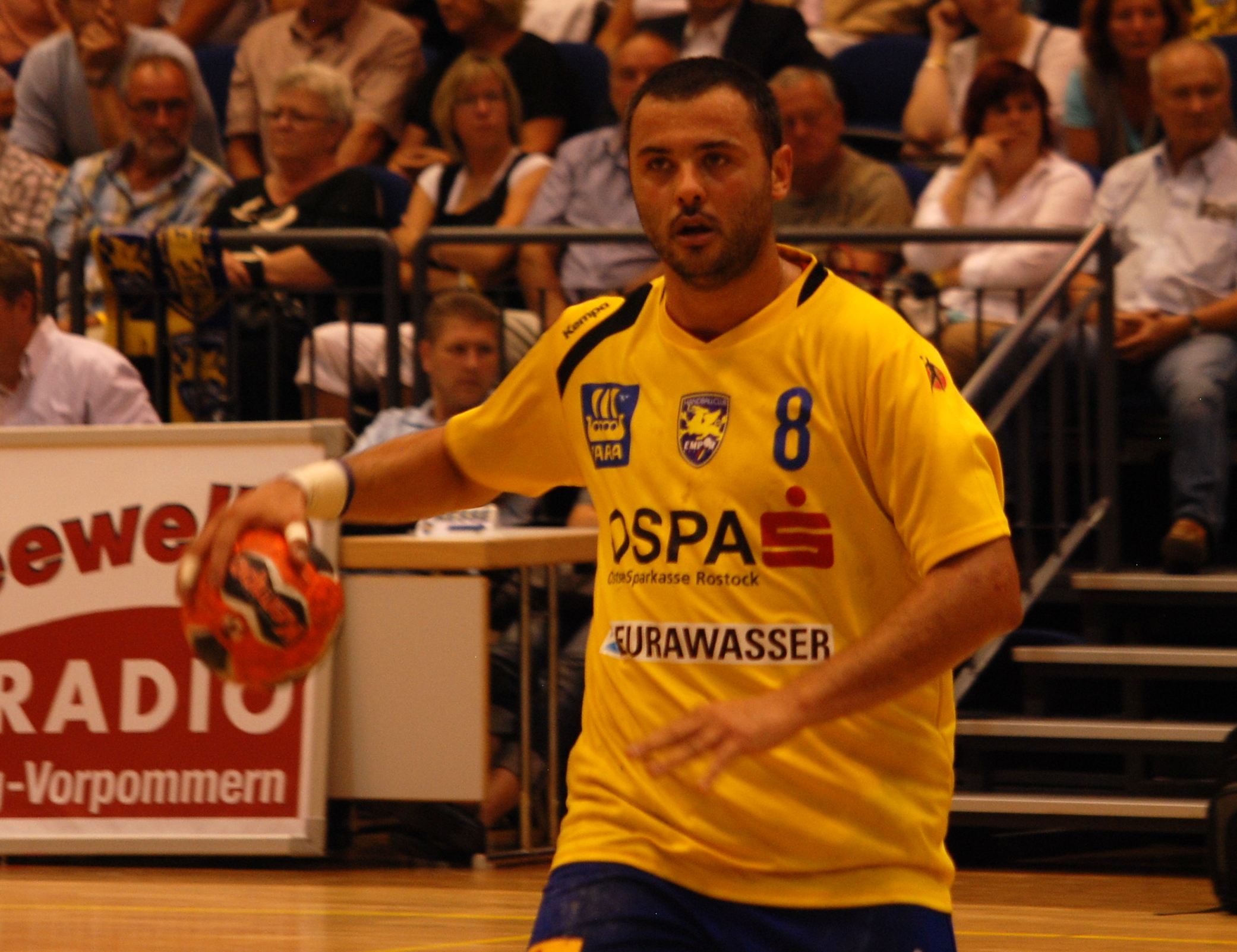

Personal information
- Nationality: Croatian
- Born: 12 April 1980 (age 46) Zagreb, SFR Yugoslavia
- Height: 1.87 m (6 ft 2 in)

Sport
- Sport: Handball
- Position: Centre back
- Number: 8

Senior clubs
- Years: Team
- 1998-2001: RK Badel 1862 Zagreb
- 2001-2005: RK Medveščak Infosistem
- 2005-2006: RK Pivovara Laško Celje
- 2006: RK Agram Medveščak
- 2006-2008: HSG Wetzlar
- 2008-2009: HCM Constanța
- 2009-2010: RK Zamet
- 2010-2011: Cuenca
- 2011-2012: RK Siscia
- 2012-2013: HC Empor Rostock
- 2013-2017: RK Metalac Zagreb
- 2017-2018: RK Medveščak
National team
Years	Team	Apps
2005-2006	Croatia	15
Medal record
Representing Croatia
Mediterranean Games
Silver medal – second place	2005 Almería	Team

Krešimir Ivanković (born 13 September 1977) is a former Croatian handball player and current coach of RK Nexe Našice.

Ivanković is the brother of Vedran Zrnić.

== Honours ==
Badel 1862 Zagreb

- Croatian First A League
  - Winner (3): 1998–99, 1999–00, 2000–01
- Croatian Cup
  - Winner (2): 1999, 2000
- EHF Champions League
  - Finalist (1): 1998-99

Pivovara Laško Celje

- Liga Telekom
  - Winner (1): 2005–06
- Slovenian Cup
  - Winner (1): 2006

HCM Constanța

- Liga Națională
  - Winner 2008–09

Metalac Zagreb

- Croatian First League
  - Winner (1): 2015-16
