= Ivana Milošević =

Serbian handball player (born 1982)

Personal information
- Nationality: Serbian
- Born: 11 June 1982 (age 44) Svilajnac, SFR Yugoslavia
- Height: 1.68 m (5 ft 6 in)

Sport
- Sport: Handball
- Position: Right wing
- Current club: ŽRK Radnički Kragujevac
- Number: 10
National team
- Years: Team
- –: Serbia
Medal record
Women's Handball
Representing Serbia
World Championship
| Silver medal – second place | 2013 Serbia | Team competition |
Representing Serbia and Montenegro
Mediterranean Games
| Silver medal – second place | 2005 Almería | Team |

Ivana Milošević (born 11 June 1982) is a Serbian handballer who plays for the Serbian club ŽRK Radnički Kragujevac and the Serbian national team.

== National team ==
Milošević represented Serbia and Montenegro at the 2005 Mediterranean Games and won a silver medal. She played for the Serbian national team at the 2012 European Handball Championship when the team finished 4th.
