= Sobhi Sioud =

Tunisian handball player

Personal information
- Nationality: Tunisian
- Born: 17 July 1975 (age 51) Mahdia, Tunisia
- Height: 187 cm (74 in)
- Weight: 87 kg (192 lb)

Sport
- Sport: Handball
- Position: Right back

Senior clubs
- Years: Team
- –1999: EM Mahdia
- 1999–2001: BM Ciudad Real
- 2001–2007: Montpellier Handball
- 2017: Shabab Al Ahli Club
National team
- Years: Team
- –: Tunisia
Medal record
Men's handball
Representing Tunisia
African Championship
Gold medal – first place	2002 Morocco	Team competition
Gold medal – first place	1998 Morocco	Team competition
Silver medal – second place	2004 Egypt	Team competition
Mediterranean Games
Silver medal – second place	2001 Tunis	Team competition

Sobhi Sioud (arabic: صبحي صيود, born 17 July 1975) is a Tunisian handball player. He competed in the men's tournament at the 2000 Summer Olympics.
