= Patricia Alonso =

Spanish handball player (born 1979)

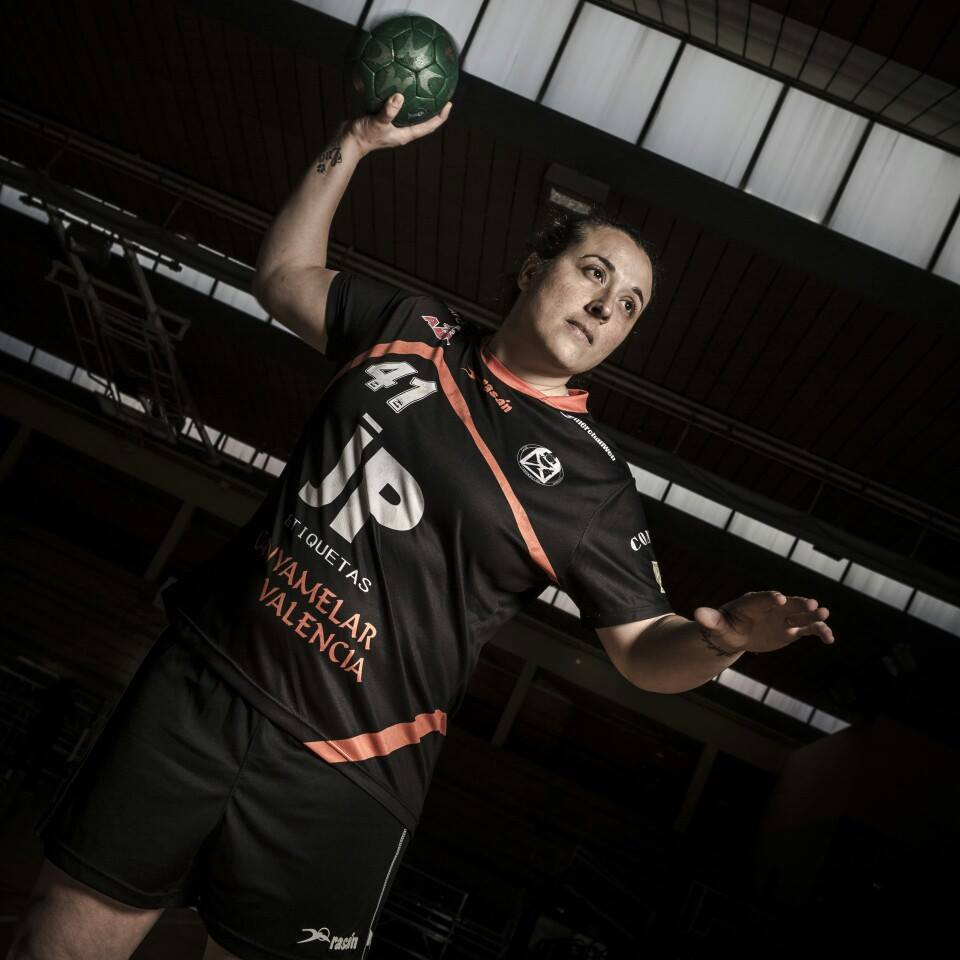

Personal information
- Full name: Patricia Alonso Jiménez
- Born: 27 April 1979 (age 47) Madrid, Spain
- Height: 170 cm (67 in)

Sport
- Sport: Handball
National team
Years	Team	Apps	(Gls)
1998-?	Spain	100	(220)
Medal record
Women's handball
Representing Spain
Mediterranean Games
Gold medal – first place	2005 Almería	Team competition
Silver medal – second place	2001 Tunis	Team competition

Patricia Alonso Jiménez (born 27 April 1979) is a Spanish team handball player who played for the club CB Amadeo Tortajada and on the Spanish national team. She was born in Madrid. She competed at the 2004 Summer Olympics in Athens, where the Spanish team reached the quarter-finals.
