= Janjić =

Janjić is a surname. Notable people with the surname include:

- Davor Janjić (born 1969), Bosnian actor
- Dejan Janjić (born 1995), Serbian basketball player
- Ilija Janjić (born 1944), Bosnian Croat Roman Catholic prelate
- Nataša Janjić (born 1981), Croatian film, stage and television actress
- Nikola Janjić (born 2002), Montenegrin footballer
- Pero Janjić (born 1944), Bosnian Croat retired handball player and coach
- Sava Janjić (born 1965), Serbian Orthodox archimandrite and a hegumen of the Visoki Dečani monastery
- Slobodan Janjić (born 1987), Serbian futsal player
- Zlatko Janjić (born 1986), Bosnian football player

== See also ==
- Janić
- Janič
