= Dhaker Seboui =

Tunisian handball player

Personal information
- Full name: Dhaker Al-Seboui
- Nationality: Tunisian
- Born: 11 April 1975 (age 51)
- Height: 179 cm (5 ft 10 in)
- Weight: 79 kg (174 lb)

Sport
- Sport: Handball
Medal record
Men's handball
Representing Tunisia
Mediterranean Games
Silver medal – second place	2001 Tunis	Team competition

Dhaker Seboui (born 11 April 1975) is a Tunisian handball player. He competed in the men's tournament at the 2000 Summer Olympics.
