= Milan Janić =

Serbian sprint canoeist (1957–2003)

Medal record

Men's canoe sprint

Representing Yugoslavia

Olympic Games
Silver medal – second place	1984 Los Angeles	K-1 1000 m

World Championships
Silver medal – second place	1978 Belgrade	K-1 1000 m
Gold medal – first place	1978 Belgrade	K-1 10000 m
Gold medal – first place	1979 Duisburg	K-1 10000 m
Gold medal – first place	1982 Belgrade	K-1 10000 m
Silver medal – second place	1981 Nottingham	K-1 10000 m
Silver medal – second place	1983 Tampere	K-1 10000 m

Mediterranean Games
Silver medal – second place	1979 Split	K-1 5000 m
Silver medal – second place	1979 Split	K-1 1000 m
Silver medal – second place	1979 Split	K-2 1000 m

Milan Janić (Serbian Cyrillic: Милан Јанић; 14 June 1957 in Bačka Palanka - 1 January 2003 in Belgrade) was a Serbian sprint canoeist who competed from the late 1970s to the mid-1980s for Yugoslavia. Competing in two Summer Olympics, he won a silver medal in the K-1 1000 m event at Los Angeles in 1984.

Janić also won six medals at the ICF Canoe Sprint World Championships with three golds (K-1 10000 m: 1978, 1979, 1982) and three silvers (K-1 1000 m: 1978, K-1 1000 m: 1981, 1983).

Janić had two sons and a daughter, all of whom also became accomplished canoeists:

- Mićo Janić (b. 1979; competed for FR Yugoslavia in the late 1990s, and for Croatia after 2004)
- Stjepan Janić (b. 1980; competed for FR Yugoslavia and switched to Croatia in 2004, appearing in the 2008 Beijing Olympics)
- Nataša Janić (b. 1982; competed for FR Yugoslavia at the 2000 Olympics, later represented Hungary at the next four Olympics (2004, 2008, 2012, 2016) and won six medals)
