= Angélique Spincer =

French handball player (born 1984)

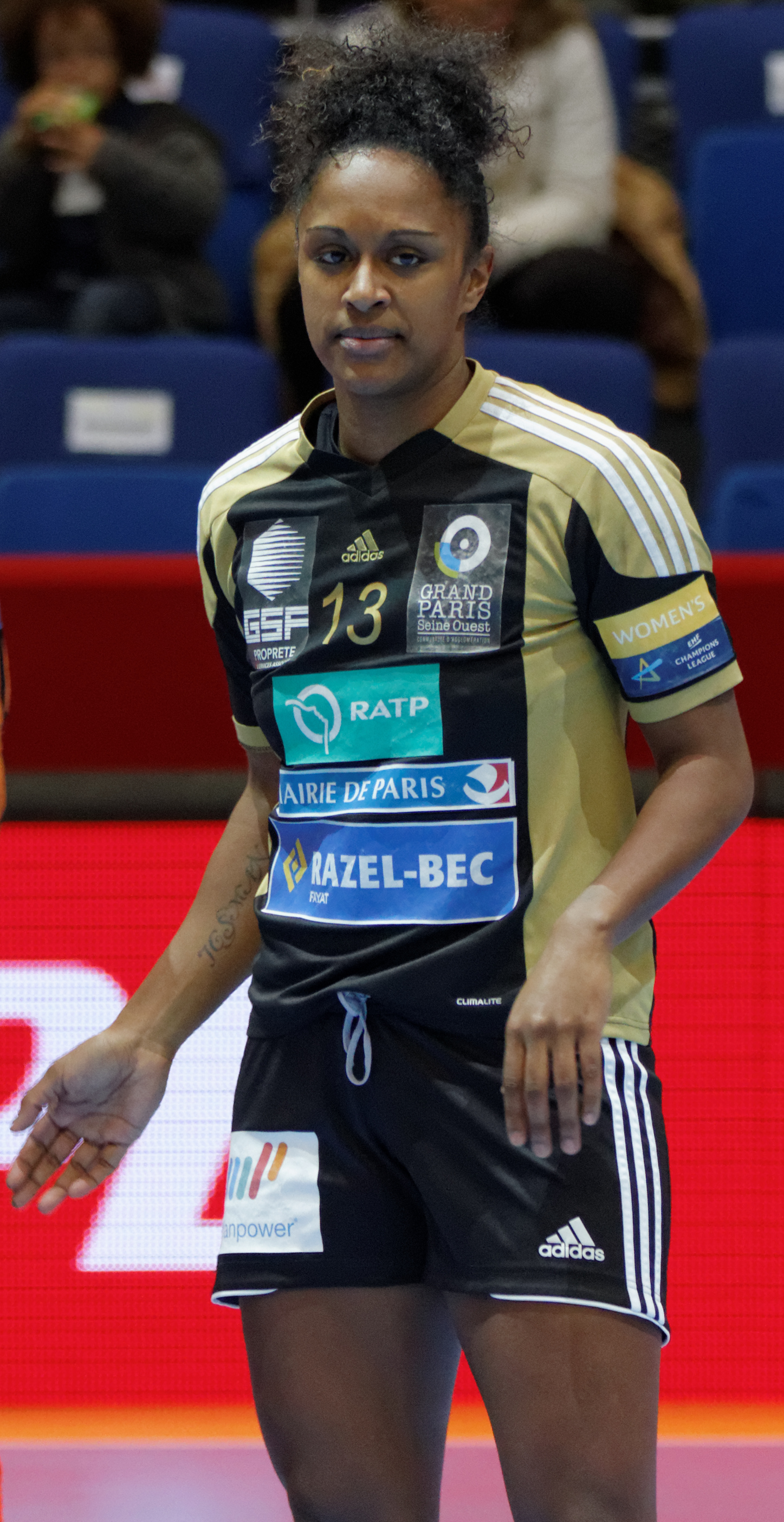
- Angélique Spincer (2013)

Personal information
- Nationality: French
- Born: 25 June 1984 (age 42) Orsay
- Height: 173 cm (68 in)

Sport
- Sport: Handball
- Position: Centre back
- Current club: Retired

Senior clubs
- Years: Team
- 2004-2006: CJF Fleury-les-Aubrais
- 2006-2015: Issy-Paris Hand
- 2015-2017: Stella Sports Saint-Maur
National team
Years	Team	Apps	(Gls)
2005-2012	France	69	(239)

Teams managed
- 2017-2020: Stella Saint-Maur Handball
- 2020-: HB Plan-de-Cuques
Medal record
Representing France
World Championship
Silver medal – second place	2011 Brazil	Team
- Updated on 2020

Angélique Spincer (born 25 June 1984) is a French former team handball player and coach, who is currently the head coach of HB Plan-de-Cuques.

She played most of her career for the French handball club Issy-Paris Hand. She played for the French national team, and participated at the 2011 World Women's Handball Championship in Brazil.

She played main as a centre back, but could also play as a left wing.

She won the French League Cup in 2013.
