= BM Aragón =

Spanish handball club

- Full name: Club Deportivo Básico Balonmano Aragón
- Founded: 2003
- Dissolved: 2016
- Arena: Príncipe Felipe, Zaragoza, Aragon, Spain
- Capacity: 11,000
- President: (Spain) Eduardo Acón
- Head coach: (Spain) Demetrio Lozano
- League: Liga ASOBAL
Home	Away

Club Deportivo Básico Balonmano Aragón, was a handball team based in Zaragoza, Aragón, Spain. Caja3 Aragón currently plays in Liga ASOBAL. The team was known as CAI Aragón in 2010–11 season and as Caja3 Aragón in 2011–12 season.

== Honours ==
- EHF Cup: 0
  - Runners-up: 2006–2007

== History ==
After the 2004-05 season, the team was promoted from Honor Division B to Liga ASOBAL. The manager was Fernando Bolea and the president, Ricardo Arregui, who reached the club in 2003.

For the 2011–12 season, the team would be known as Caja3 Aragón due to sponsorship of Caja3. This sponsorship was cancelled following 2011–12 season due to financial problems of Caja3.

On 11 April 2016, after withdrawing from the 2015–16 Liga ASOBAL, BM Aragón was dissolved.

=== Season by season ===
Season	Tier	Division	Pos.	Notes
2003–04	2	Honor B	5th	
2004–05	2	Honor B	2nd	Promoted
2005–06	1	ASOBAL	7th	
2006–07	1	ASOBAL	6th	
2007–08	1	ASOBAL	6th	
2008–09	1	ASOBAL	8th	
2009–10	1	ASOBAL	7th	
2010–11	1	ASOBAL	6th	
2011–12	1	ASOBAL	5th	
2012–13	1	ASOBAL	5th	
2013–14	1	ASOBAL	9th	
2014–15	1	ASOBAL	13th	
2015–16	1	ASOBAL	R	Retired

- 11 seasons in Liga ASOBAL

== 2015–16 squad ==
Goalkeepers
- 01 (Spain) Jorge Olano
- 12 (Spain) Álvaro Fernández
- 33 (Spain) Julio Rodríguez

Line players
- 15 (Spain) Pedro Fuentes Sánchez-Migallón
- 19 (Spain) Miguel Arnillas
- 90 (Spain) Alejandro Egea Álvarez

Wingers
- 02 (Spain) Amadeo Sorli
- 21 (Spain) Antonio Cartón
- 22 (Spain) Álvaro Pascual
- 24 (Spain) Javier Ariño

Back players
- 05 (Spain) Segio García
- 06 (Spain) Borja Domingo
- 13 (Spain) Juan Castro
- 14 (Argentina) Juan Agustín Vidal
- 18 (Spain) Demetrio Lozano
- 26 (Spain) Ignacio Alemany Juan

Technical staff
- Head coach: (Spain) Miguel Ángel Martín
- Assistant coach: (Spain) José Luis Gargallo Azpelicueta

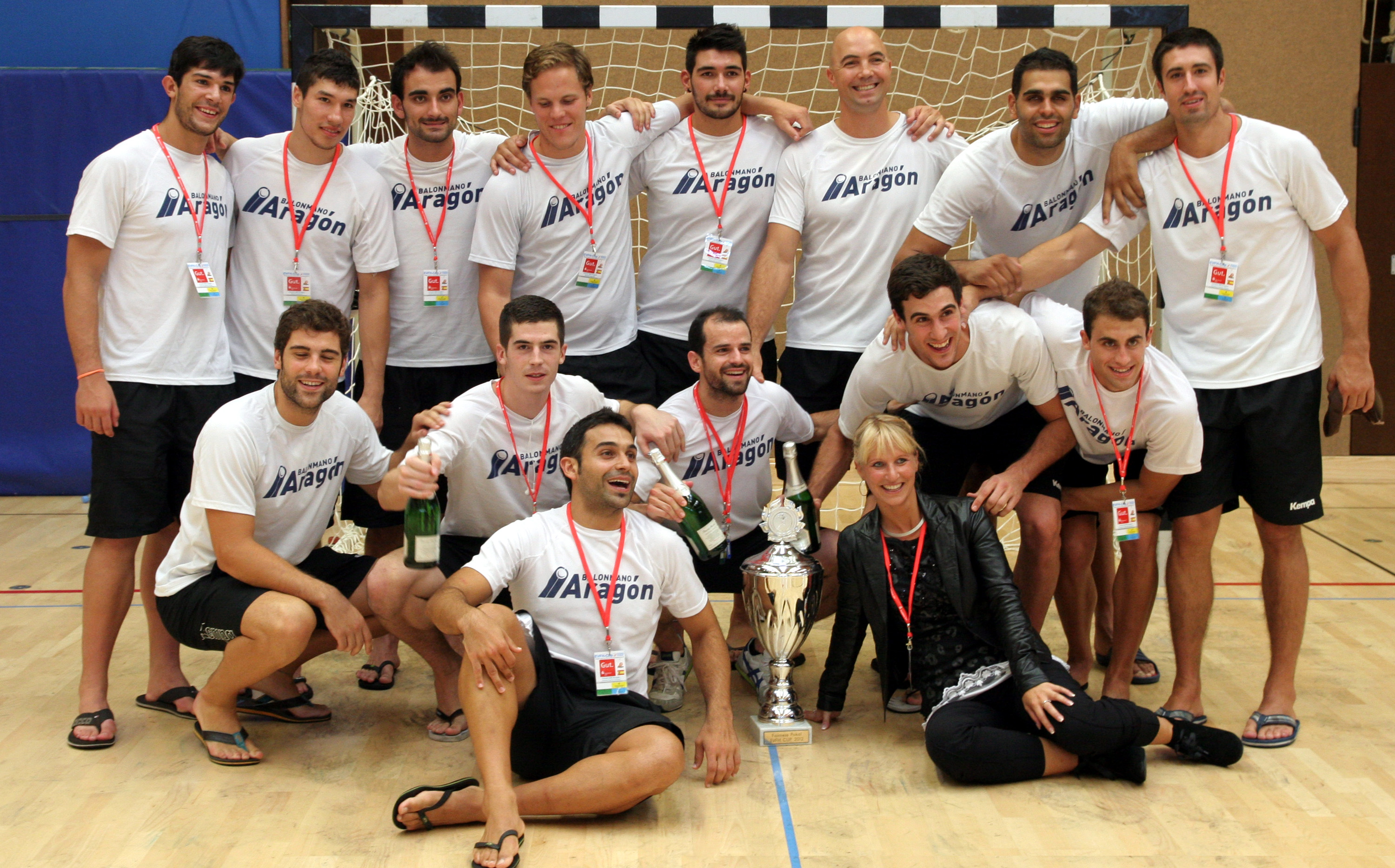
BM Aragón in August 2012

.

== Notable players ==
- (Egypt) Hussein Zaky
- (Sweden) Dalibor Doder
- (Spain) Mariano Ortega
- (Spain) Iñaki Malumbres Aldave
- (Slovenia) Beno Lapajne
- (Spain) Valero Rivera Folch
- (Spain) Jorge Maqueda
- (Sweden) Robert Arrhenius
- (Serbia) Ivan Stanković
- (Serbia) (Bosnia and Herzegovina) Vukašin Stojanović

== Notable former coaches ==
- (Serbia) Veroljub Kosovac
- (Spain) Mariano Ortega

== Stadium information ==
- Name: - Príncipe Felipe Arena
- City: - Zaragoza
- Capacity: - 12,000 people
- Address: - Plaza Ángel Sanz Briz 16, 1ºA
