= Ali Madi =

Tunisian handball player

Personal information
- Nationality: Tunisian
- Born: 21 May 1976 (age 50)
- Height: 175 cm (5 ft 9 in)
- Weight: 96 kg (212 lb)

Sport
- Sport: Handball
Medal record
Men's handball
Representing Tunisia
Mediterranean Games
Silver medal – second place	2001 Tunis	Team competition

Ali Madi (born 21 May 1976) is a Tunisian handball player. He competed in the men's tournament at the 2000 Summer Olympics.
