= Janič =

Janič is a surname. Notable people with the surname include:

- Lukáš Janič (born 1986), Slovak football player

== See also ==
- Janić
- Janjić
