= Demetrio Lozano =

Spanish handball player (born 1975)

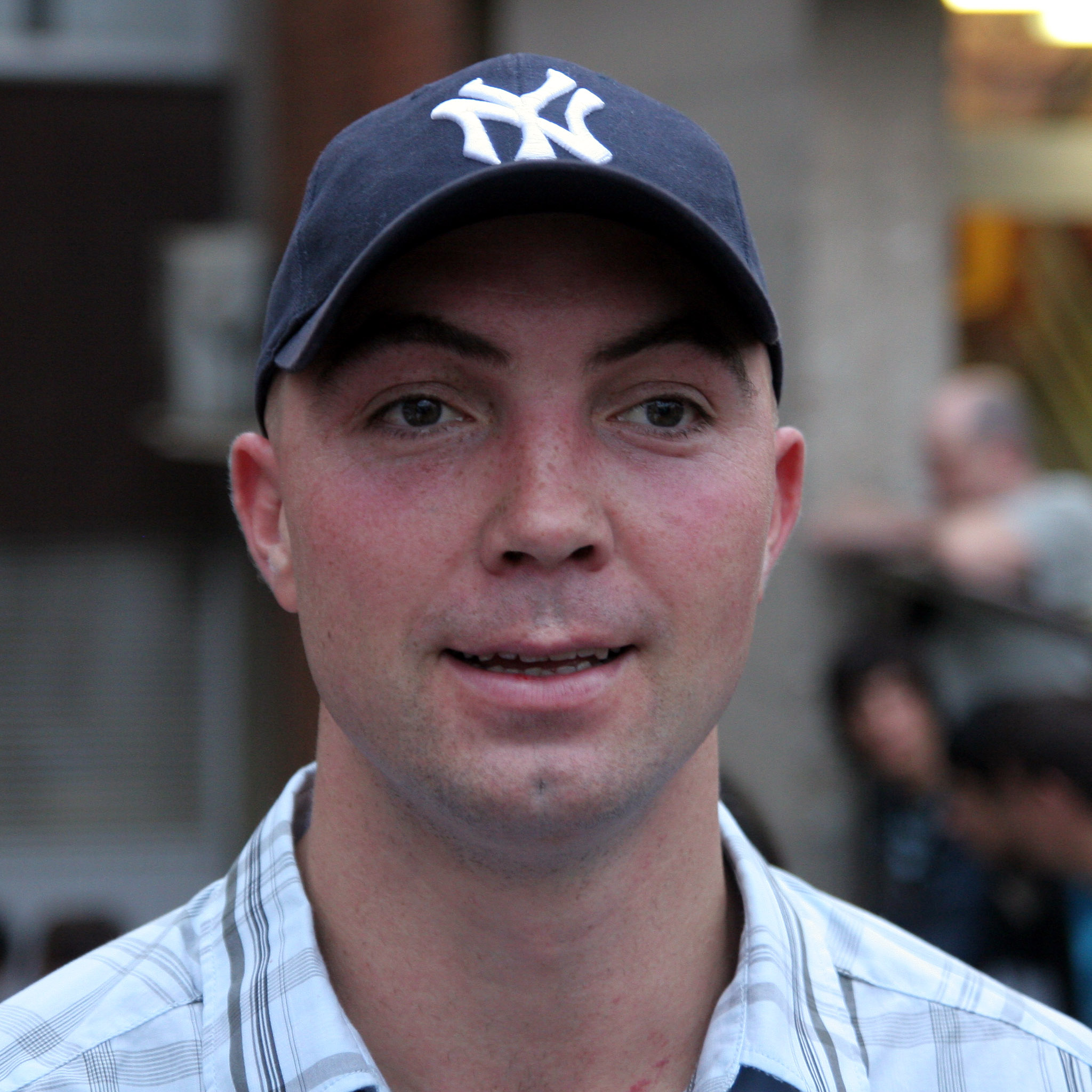

Personal information
- Full name: Demetrio Lozano Jarque
- Nationality: ESP
- Born: 23 September 1975 (age 51) Alcalá de Henares, Spain
- Height: 1.95 m (6 ft 5 in)

Sport
- Sport: Handball
- Position: Defender; Left back
- Current club: BM Aragón

Senior clubs
- Years: Team
- 1993–1995: Juventud Alcalá
- 1995–1998: Caja España Ademar
- 1998–2001: FC Barcelona
- 2001–2004: THW Kiel
- 2004–2007: Portland San Antonio
- 2007–2010: FC Barcelona
- 2010–2014: BM Aragón
National team
Years	Team	Apps	(Gls)
1995-2008	Spain	223	(462)

Teams managed
- 2014–2016: BM Aragón
Medal record
Olympic Games
Bronze medal – third place	1996 Atlanta	Team competition
Bronze medal – third place	2000 Sydney	Team competition
Bronze medal – third place	2008 Beijing	Team competition
World Championship
Gold medal – first place	2005 Tunisia
European Championship
Silver medal – second place	2006 Switzerland
Silver medal – second place	1998 Italy
Silver medal – second place	1996 Spain
Bronze medal – third place	2000 Croatia
Mediterranean Games
Gold medal – first place	2005 Almería	Team competition

Demetrio Lozano Jarque (born September 26, 1975) is a Spanish former handball player and coach, who played for the Spanish national team. He played primarily as a left back, but could play all three back positions.

He was on Spain's team that won the 2005 World Championship in Tunisia.

== Career ==
Lozano started playing handball at his hometown club Juventud Alcalá. In 1995 he joined CB Ademar León in the Spanish Liga ASOBAL. In 1998 he joined top club FC Barcelona. There he won the 1998-99 and 1999-2000 Spanish Championships, the EHF Champions League and the EHF Supercup, the Copa del Rey and the Copa ASOBAL.

In 2001 he joined German club THW Kiel. There he won the 2001-2002 Handball-Bundesliga and the 2002 and 2004 EHF European League. In 2004 he returned to Spain and joined Portland San Antonio. There he won the 2004-25 Spanish Championship, and reached the final of the Champions League in 2006 where they lost to league rivals BM Ciudad Real.

In 2007 he rejoined FC Barcelona until 2010, where he joined BM Aragón.

He retired in 2014 to become a coach at BM Aragón, but made a short comeback in October 2014.

== National team ==
He debuted for the national team in November 1995, where he played for more than a decade. From 1993 to 1995 he played for the Spanish youth national team.

He participated at the 2008 summer Olympics in Beijing as a member of the Spain men's national handball team. The team won a bronze medal, defeating Croatia in the third place playoff. This was his last major international tournament.

== Private life ==
He has a degree in sports science. In 2010 he got a master's degree.
