= Sandra Pešić =

Croatian basketball player

Personal information
- Born: January 21, 1971 (age 55) Split, SFR Yugoslavia
- Listed height: 1.70 m (5 ft 7 in)

Career information
- Playing career: –2007
- Position: Small forward / power forward

Career history
- Livno
- 2005–2007: Studenac Omiš
Medals
Women's basketball
Representing Croatia
Mediterranean Games
Silver medal – second place	2005 Almería	Team

Sandra Pešić (born 21 January 1971 in Split, SFR Yugoslavia) is a Croatian female professional basketball player.
