= Vícar =

- Flag Coat of arms

- Location of Vícar Vícar (Andalusia) Vícar (Spain)
- Coordinates: 36°49′54″N 2°38′35″W
- Country: Spain
- Community: Andalusia
- Province: Almería
- Comarca: Poniente Almeriense
- Municipality: Vícar

Government
  - Mayor (2015-: Antonio Bonilla Rodríguez (PSOE-A)

Area
  - Total: 64 km^{2} (25 sq mi)
- Elevation: 288 m (945 ft)

Population (2025-01-01)
  - Total: 29,342
  - Density: 460/km^{2} (1,200/sq mi)
- Time zone: UTC+1 (CET)
  - Summer (DST): UTC+2 (CEST)

Vícar is a municipality of Almería province, in the autonomous community of Andalusia, Spain.

== Demographics ==
Historical population
Year	Pop.	±%
2000	15,940	—
2001	16,523	+3.7%
2002	16,464	−0.4%
2003	16,747	+1.7%
2004	16,935	+1.1%
2005	19,830	+17.1%
2006	20,220	+2.0%
2017	25,149	+24.4%
Source: INE (Spain)

== See also ==
- List of municipalities in Almería
