= Marija Lojpur =

Serbian handball player (born 1983)

Personal information
- Nationality: Serbian
- Born: 10 August 1983 (age 43) Kragujevac, SFR Yugoslavia
- Height: 1.81 m (5 ft 11 in)

Sport
- Sport: Handball
- Position: Pivot
- Current club: Szeged KKSE

Senior clubs
- Years: Team
- 2003–2004: ŽRK Radnički Belgrade
- 2004–2006: HC HUMMEL
- 2006–2007: Аriostopallamano
- 2007–2009: Casalgrande padana
- 2009–2010: Аriostopallamano
- 2010–2011: h.a.c.Nuoro
- 2011–2012: HC Jagodina
- 2012–2014: ŽRK Vardar
- 2014–: Szeged KKSE
National team
Years	Team	Apps	(Gls)
–	Serbia	48	(72)
Medal record
Representing Serbia
World Championship
Silver medal – second place	2013 Serbia	Team
Representing Serbia and Montenegro
Mediterranean Games
Silver medal – second place	2005 Almería	Team

Marija Lojpur (Serbian: Марија Лојпур; born 10 August 1983) is a Serbian handball player. She plays for the club Szeged KKSE, and on the Serbian national team. She represented Serbia at the 2013 World Women's Handball Championship, where Serbia won silver medals, which is their best result ever. She also represented Serbia at the 2014 European Championship.
