= Ricardo Arregui =

Spanish neurosurgeon

Ricardo Arregui Calvo (born 19 September 1952) is a neurosurgeon doctor, frostbite specialist and former president of CAI Balonmano Aragón and Asobal Handball League.

== Career ==
After studying Medicine at the University of Zaragoza, Arregui researched Mountain Medicine at the Frostbite Unit at Hospital Clínico Universitario "Lozano Blesa", and later 2000 in Clinica MAZ.

He became the official doctor of the Al filo de lo imposible TV documentary series for which went on expeditions to Mount Everest (year 1992) and the North Pole (year 2000). After the Mount Everest expedition, Arregui wrote a scientific and personal journal: "El quirófano del hielo: del bisturí al Everest".

Spanish mountaineers Edurne Pasaban, Juanito Oiarzabal and Alberto Iñurrategi have been treated by Arregui, as have Ecuadorian, Ivan Vallejo, and Juanjo San Sebastian who lost fingers and toes through frostbite.

Besides his medical career, Arregui was from 2003 to 2008 president of CAI Balonmano Aragón handball team that played for the EHF Cup and the Asobal League. He also was president of Asobal League (2006–2007).
