= Mićo Janić =

Serbian and Croatian sprint canoer (born 1979)

Medal record

Men's canoe sprint

Representing Yugoslavia

World Championships
Silver medal – second place	1998 Szeged	K-2 1000 m

Representing Croatia

Mediterranean Games
Gold medal – first place	2005 Almería	K-2 500 m

Mićo Janić (Serbian: Мићо Јанић; born 28 May 1979 in Bačka Palanka, SFR Yugoslavia) is a Serbian and Croatian sprint canoer who competed in the late 1990s. He won a silver medal in the K-2 1000 m event at the 1998 ICF Canoe Sprint World Championships in Szeged.

He is the son of Serbian canoer Milan Janić. His sister is Nataša Janić, a multiple canoe Olympic gold medalist for Hungary. His brother Stjepan is also canoer.
