= Canoeing at the 2005 Mediterranean Games =

The Canoeing Competition at the 2005 Mediterranean Games was held in the Cuevas del Almanzora Canal in Almería, Spain from June 25 to July 1, 2005. There were just flatwater events.

== Men's competition ==
=== K-1 500m ===
Rank	Final
1st place, gold medalist(s)	Sébastien Jouve (FRA)
2nd place, silver medalist(s)	Carlos Pérez (ESP)
3rd place, bronze medalist(s)	Andrea Facchin (ITA)

=== K-1 1.000m ===
Rank	Final
1st place, gold medalist(s)	Stjepan Janić (CRO)
2nd place, silver medalist(s)	Cyrille Carré (FRA)
3rd place, bronze medalist(s)	Jernej Župančič Regent (SLO)

=== K-2 500m ===
Rank	Final
1st place, gold medalist(s)	Stjepan Janić (CRO); Mićo Janić (CRO)
2nd place, silver medalist(s)	Francisco Llera (ESP); Damian Vindel (ESP)
3rd place, bronze medalist(s)	Ognjen Filipović (SCG); Dragan Zorić (SCG)

=== K-2 1.000m ===
Rank	Final
1st place, gold medalist(s)	Javier Hernand (ESP); Pablo Enrique Baños (ESP)
2nd place, silver medalist(s)	Sébastien Jouve (FRA); Philippe Colin (FRA)
3rd place, bronze medalist(s)	Andrea Facchin (ITA); Antonio Scaduto (ITA)

== Women's competition ==
=== K-1 500m ===
Rank	Final
1st place, gold medalist(s)	Fabiana Sgroi (ITA)
2nd place, silver medalist(s)	Teresa Portela (ESP)
3rd place, bronze medalist(s)	Anne Laure Viard (FRA)

=== K-1 1.000m ===
Rank	Final
1st place, gold medalist(s)	Anna Ricciotti (ITA)
2nd place, silver medalist(s)	Fabiana Sgroi (ITA)
3rd place, bronze medalist(s)	Marie Delattre (FRA)

== Medal table ==
Place	Nation	1st place, gold medalist(s)	2nd place, silver medalist(s)	3rd place, bronze medalist(s)	Total
1	Italy	2	1	2	5
2	Croatia	2	0	0	2
3	Spain	1	3	0	4
4	France	1	2	2	5
5	Serbia and Montenegro	0	0	1	1
5	Slovenia	0	0	1	1
Total		6	6	6	18
