= Slovenia women's national handball team =

Women's national handball team representing Slovenia

Information
- Association: Handball Federation of Slovenia
- Coach: Dragan Adžić
- Most caps: Sergeja Stefanišin (212)
- Most goals: Ana Gros (767)

Colours
1st	2nd

Results

Summer Olympics
- Appearances: 1 (First in 2024)
- Best result: 11th (2024)

World Championship
- Appearances: 8 (First in 1997)
- Best result: 8th (2003)

European Championship
- Appearances: 9 (First in 2002)
- Best result: 8th (2022)
- Last updated on Unknown.

Slovenia women's national handball team
Medal record

Mediterranean Games
Silver medal – second place	2013 Mersin	Team
Bronze medal – third place	1997 Bari	
Bronze medal – third place	2001 Tunisia	
Bronze medal – third place	2018 Tarragona	Team

The Slovenia women's national handball team is the national handball team of Slovenia.

== Competitive record ==
Champions Runners-up Third place Fourth place

=== Olympic Games ===
Year	Position	GP	W	D	L	GS	GA	GD
1976–1988	Part of Yugoslavia							
(Spain) 1992	Did not enter							
(United States) 1996	Did not qualify							
(Australia) 2000	Did not qualify							
(Greece) 2004	Did not qualify							
(China) 2008	Did not qualify							
(United Kingdom) 2012	Did not qualify							
(Brazil) 2016	Did not qualify							
(Japan) 2020	Did not qualify							
(France) 2024	11th	5	1	0	4	116	147	−31
(United States) 2028	TBD							
(Australia) 2032	TBD							
Total	1/11	5	1	0	4	116	147	−31

=== World Championship ===
Year	Position	GP	W	D	L	GS	GA	GD
1957–1990	Part of Yugoslavia							
(Norway) 1993	Did not enter							
(Austria) (Hungary) 1995	Did not qualify							
(Germany) 1997	18th	5	1	0	4	136	158	−22
(Denmark) (Norway) 1999	Did not qualify							
(Italy) 2001	9th	6	4	0	2	168	140	+28
(Croatia) 2003	8th	8	5	0	3	232	224	+8
(Russia) 2005	14th	5	2	1	2	159	132	+27
(France) 2007	Did not qualify							
(China) 2009	Did not qualify							
(Brazil) 2011	Did not qualify							
(Serbia) 2013	Did not qualify							
(Denmark) 2015	Did not qualify							
(Germany) 2017	14th	6	3	0	3	159	167	−8
(Japan) 2019	19th	7	3	0	4	190	209	−19
(Spain) 2021	17th	6	1	2	3	148	156	−8
(Denmark) (Norway) (Sweden) 2023	11th	6	4	0	2	171	167	+4
(Germany) (Netherlands) 2025	Did not qualify							
(Hungary) 2027	TBD							
(Spain) 2029	TBD							
(Czech Republic) (Poland) 2031	TBD							
Total	8/20	48	23	3	23	1363	1353	+10

=== European Championship ===
Year	Position	GP	W	D	L	GS	GA	GD
(Germany) 1994	Did not qualify							
(Denmark) 1996	Did not qualify							
(Netherlands) 1998	Did not qualify							
(Romania) 2000	Did not qualify							
(Denmark) 2002	10th	6	2	0	4	151	166	−15
(Hungary) 2004	9th	6	2	0	4	164	181	−17
(Sweden) 2006	16th	3	0	0	3	80	108	−28
(North Macedonia) 2008	Did not qualify							
(Denmark) (Norway) 2010	16th	3	0	0	3	54	89	−35
(Serbia) 2012	Did not qualify							
(Croatia) (Hungary) 2014	Did not qualify							
(Sweden) 2016	14th	3	1	0	2	77	89	−12
(France) 2018	13th	3	1	0	2	82	93	−11
(Denmark) 2020	16th	3	0	0	3	65	83	−18
(Montenegro) (North Macedonia) (Slovenia) 2022	8th	6	3	0	3	151	156	−5
(Austria) (Hungary) (Switzerland) 2024	10th	7	3	0	4	186	200	−14
(Czech Republic) (Poland) (Romania) (Slovakia) (Turkey) 2026	Qualified							
(Denmark) (Norway) (Sweden) 2028	TBD							
(Belgium) (France) 2030	TBD							
(Denmark) (Germany) (Poland) 2032	TBD							
Total	10/20	40	12	0	28	1010	1165	−155

=== Mediterranean Games ===
- 1993 – 3rd place
- 1997 – 3rd place
- 2001 – 3rd place
- 2005 – 7th place
- 2009 – 7th place
- 2013 – Runners-up
- 2018 – 3rd place
- 2022 – Did not participate
- 2026 – TBD
- 2030 – TBD

== Current squad ==
Squad for the 2026 European Women's Handball Championship.

Head coach: Dragan Adžić

No.	Pos.	Name	Date of birth (age)	Height	App.	Goals	Club
3	P	Manca Jurič	18 January 1995 (age 31)	1.74 m	42	39	(Croatia) RK Lokomotiva Zagreb
4	LB	Erin Novak	7 June 2002 (age 24)	1.77 m	44	36	(Italy) Handball Erice
8	LW	Ema Abina	18 February 1999 (age 27)	1.70 m	61	79	(Slovenia) RK Krim
9	LB	Ana Abina	30 July 1997 (age 29)	1.80 m	99	157	(Slovenia) RK Krim
10	LB	Tjaša Stanko	5 November 1997 (age 29)	1.73 m	129	569	(Hungary) Győri Audi ETO KC
11	LB	Ema Hrvatin	4 January 2000 (age 26)	1.77 m	35	57	(Romania) CSM Târgu Jiu
12	GK	Zala Vuk	3 December 2005 (age 20)	1.77 m	3	0	(Slovenia) ŽRK Ajdovščina
13	CB	Nuša Fegic	29 December 1998 (age 27)	1.69 m	26	56	(Poland) Enea MKS Gniezno
16	GK	Maja Vojnović	26 January 1998 (age 28)	1.80 m	100	9	(Slovenia) RK Krim
17	P	Nataša Ljepoja	28 January 1996 (age 30)	1.78 m	99	217	(Croatia) RK Podravka Koprivnica
18	CB	Nina Zulić	4 December 1995 (age 30)	1.70 m	81	205	(Slovenia) RK Krim
19	LB	Špela Bajc	13 February 2001 (age 25)	1.78 m	23	27	(Slovenia) ŽRK Ajdovščina
22	GK	Dijana Đajić	3 October 2004 (age 22)	1.85 m	24	0	(Germany) Frankfurter HC
24	LW	Tinkara Kogovšek	21 November 2004 (aged 20)	1.70 m	15	24	(Slovenia) RK Krim
25	LB	Ivona Barukčić	2 March 2002 (age 24)	1.77 m	21	25	(Slovenia) ŽRK Ajdovščina
29	RW	Živa Čopi	5 August 1998 (age 28)	1.63 m	38	41	(Turkey) Bursa BBSK
31	P	Lana Puncer	31 March 2006 (age 20)	1.81 m	21	9	(Slovenia) RK Krim
71	LW	Ema Marković	17 August 2003 (age 23)	1.70 m	41	53	(Slovenia) RK Krim

=== Individual all-time records ===
Still active players are highlighted

==== Most matches played ====
Total number of matches played for the senior national team.

#	Player	Matches	Goals
1	Sergeja Stefanišin	212	0
2	Tatjana Oder	164	686
3	Ana Gros	159	767
4	Anja Frešer	143	531
5	Vesna Vinčić	132	121
6	Katja Kurent	126	206
7	Tjaša Stanko	123	527
8	Deja Ivanović	116	276
9	Neli Irman	115	292
10	Barbara Lazović	112	328

Last updated: 1 October 2025

==== Most goals scored ====
Total number of goals scored in official matches only.

#	Player	Goals	Matches	Average
1	Ana Gros	767	159	4.82
2	Tatjana Oder	686	164	4.18
3	Simona Šturm	593	79	7.5
4	Anja Frešer	531	143	3.71
5	Tjaša Stanko	527	123	4.28
6	Tamara Mavsar	395	109	3.62
7	Barbara Lazović	328	112	2.92
8	Neli Irman	292	115	2.53
9	Nataliya Derepasko	278	51	5.45
10	Deja Ivanović	276	116	2.37

Last updated: 1 October 2025

== Head coaches ==
Name	Period
Antun Bašić	1992–1993
Andrej Kavčič	1993–1997
Marta Bon	1997–1998
Vinko Kandija	1998–2000
Tone Tiselj	2000–2003
Marta Bon	2003–2004
Robert Beguš	2004–2008
Primož Pori	2008–2009
Ivica Rimanić	2009–2011
Tone Tiselj	2011–2012
Marta Bon	2012–2015
Uroš Bregar	2015–2021
Dragan Adžić	2021–present
