= Shooting at the 2005 Mediterranean Games =

Shooting competition

The shooting competition at the 2005 Mediterranean Games was held in the Mediterranean Games Shooting Centre in Almería, Spain.

== Medallists ==
=== Men's competition ===
Event	Gold	Silver	Bronze
10 m Air Rifle	(France) Alexandre Zimmer	(Serbia and Montenegro) Nemanja Mirosavljev	(Turkey) Halil İbrahim Öztürk
50 m Rifle 3 Positions	(Serbia and Montenegro) Stevan Pletikosic	(Serbia and Montenegro) Nemanja Mirosavljev	(France) Valérian Sauveplane
50 m Rifle Prone	(France) Valérian Sauveplane	(Italy) Roberto Facheric	(Italy) Marco De Nicolo
10 m Air Pistol	(Italy) Francesco Bruno	(Turkey) Yusuf Dikeç	(Serbia and Montenegro) Damir Mikec
Trap	(Italy) Giovanni Pellielo	(Italy) Massimo Fabbrizi	(Spain) Lorenzo Santana
Double Trap	(Italy) Marco Innocenti	(Italy) Daniele Di Spigno	(Malta) William Chetcuti
Skeet	(Italy) Ennio Falco	(Italy) Andrea Benelli	(Cyprus) Georgios Achilleos

=== Women's competition ===
Event	Gold	Silver	Bronze
10 m Air Rifle	(France) Sandra Graziotin	(Spain) Nuria Vega	(Serbia and Montenegro) Aranka Binder
50 m Rifle 3 Positions	(France) Nathalie Robin	(Croatia) Suzana Spirelja	(Spain) Cristina Fernández
10 m Air Pistol	(France) Brigitte Roy	(Greece) Maria Papadaki	(Italy) Manuela Franzoli
25 m Pistol	(Serbia and Montenegro) Jasna Šekarić	(Spain) María Pilar Fernández	(Greece) Agathi Kassoumi
Trap	(France) Delphine Racinet	(San Marino) Daniela Del Din	(Spain) Vanessa Oliveria

== Medal table ==
Rank	Nation	Gold	Silver	Bronze	Total
1	France (FRA)	6	0	1	7
2	Italy (ITA)	4	4	2	10
3	Serbia and Montenegro (SCG)	2	2	2	6
4	Spain (ESP)	0	2	3	5
5	Greece (GRE)	0	1	1	2
5	Turkey (TUR)	0	1	1	2
7	Croatia (CRO)	0	1	0	1
7	San Marino (SMR)	0	1	0	1
9	Cyprus (CYP)	0	0	1	1
9	Malta (MLT)	0	0	1	1
Totals (10 entries)		12	12	12	36
