= Mariano Ortega =

Spanish handball player

Personal information
- Full name: Luis Mariano Ortega Martínez
- Born: 17 April 1971 (age 55) Esparreguera, Spain
- Height: 189 cm (74 in)

Sport
- Sport: Handball
- Position: Right back

Senior clubs
- Years: Team
- 1992–1996: BM Valladolid
- 1996–2001: CB Cantabria Santander
- 2001-2005: BM Ciudad Real
- 2005-2009: BM Aragón
National team
Years	Team	Apps	(Gls)
–	Spain	131	(247)

Teams managed
- 2008–2009: BM Aragón (Assistent)
- 2009–2014: BM Aragón
- 2014–: S.L. Benfica
- 2022–2023: BM Villa de Aranda
Medal record
World Championship
Gold medal – first place	2005 Tunisia	Team
European Championship
Silver medal – second place	2006 Switzerland	Team
Silver medal – second place	1998 Italy	Team
Bronze medal – third place	2000 Croatia	Team

Luis Mariano Ortega Martínez is a Spanish Handball coach and former player. He won the 2005 World Men's Handball Championship with the Spain national team.

== Career ==
Ortega started his professional career at BM Valladolid in 1992. In 1996 he joined CB Cantabria Santander. Here he won the 1997 and 1998 Copa ASOBAL and the 1998 EHF Cup Winners' Cup.

He then joined BM Ciudad Real in 2001. Here he won the 2003 Copa del Rey de Balonmano, 2004 Liga ASOBAL and the 2005 Supercopa Asobal. In 2005 he joined BM Aragon. In 2008 he became assistant coach at the club, and in 2009 he too over as head coach.

In 2014 he too over as head coach of the Portuguese top club S.L. Benfica.

From mid 2021–22 season until September 2023 he coached the Spain side Club Balonmano Villa de Aranda.
