= Ivana Jelčić =

Croatian handball player (born 1980)

Personal information
- Nationality: Croatian
- Born: 16 March 1980 (age 46) Mostar, SR Bosnia and Herzegovina, SFR Yugoslavia
- Height: 1.79 m (5 ft 10 in)

Sport
- Sport: Handball
- Position: Goalkeeper
- Current club: RK Lokomotiva Zagreb
- Number: 16
National team
Years	Team	Apps	(Gls)
–	Croatia	203	(0)

Ivana Jelčić (born 16 March 1980) is a Croatian handball goalkeeper. She plays on the Croatian national team, and participated at the 2011 World Women's Handball Championship in Brazil and the 2012 Summer Olympics.
