= Stjepan Janić =

Medal record

Men's canoe sprint

Representing Yugoslavia

World Championships
Silver medal – second place	1998 Szeged	K-2 1000 m

Representing Croatia

Mediterranean Games
Gold medal – first place	2005 Almería	K1 1000 m
Gold medal – first place	2005 Almería	K2 500 m
Silver medal – second place	2009 Pescara	K1 500 m
Bronze medal – third place	2009 Pescara	K1 1000 m

Stjepan Janić (Serbian: Стјепан Јанић; born 24 November 1980 in Bačka Palanka, Serbia), is a Serbian and Croatian sprint canoer.

In 1998, he won his first silver medal as a member of the Serbia and Montenegro (then under Yugoslavia) crew which took the K-2 1000 m title at the World Championships in Szeged, Hungary. In 2004, he started competing for Croatia.

Janić is a member of the Kajak klub Jarun from Zagreb. He is 6’0” (1.84 m) tall and weighs 190 lbs (86 kg). He is the son of Serbian canoer Milan Janić. His sister is Nataša Janić, a multiple canoe Olympic gold medalist for Hungary.

Janić competed at the 2008 Summer Olympics in Beijing, finishing seventh in the K-1 1000 m and ninth in the K-1 500 m events.
