= Handball at the Mediterranean Games =

Handball

Handball has been played consistently at the Mediterranean Games since the year 1967 for men except in 1971 and since the year 1979 for women except 1983. The Yugoslavian national handball team is the most successful men's team and the French women's national handball team is the most successful team for women.

== Men's tournaments ==
Year	Host	Gold medal game			Bronze medal game		
Year	Host	Gold medalist	Score	Silver medalist	Bronze medalist	Score	Fourth place
1967; Details	(Tunisia); Tunis	Yugoslavia	^{n/a}	Spain	Tunisia	^{n/a}	Algeria
1971; Details	(Turkey); İzmir	Cancelled			Cancelled		
1975; Details	(Algeria); Algiers	Yugoslavia	^{n/a}	Spain	Algeria	^{n/a}	Tunisia
1979; Details	(Socialist Federal Republic of Yugoslavia); Split	Yugoslavia	32 – 8	Italy	Tunisia	25 – 18	France
1983; Details	(Morocco); Casablanca	Yugoslavia	17 – 11	Algeria	Spain		Tunisia
1987; Details	(Syria); Latakia	Algeria	24 – 23; Overtime	France	Spain	25 – 23	Syria
1991; Details	(Greece); Athens	Yugoslavia	^{n/a}	Egypt	Italy	^{n/a}	Greece
1993; Details	(France); Languedoc-Roussillon	Croatia	26 – 19	France	Slovenia	24 – 23	Egypt
1997; Details	(Italy); Bari	Croatia	21 – 20	Italy	Spain	31 – 27	Slovenia
2001; Details	(Tunisia); Tunis	Croatia	25 – 24	Tunisia	France	22 – 21	Spain
2005; Details	(Spain); Almería	Spain	28 – 21	Croatia	Tunisia	32 – 26	Serbia and Montenegro
2009; Details	(Italy); Pescara	Serbia	35 – 31	France	Tunisia	28 – 24	Turkey
2013; Details	(Turkey); Mersin	Egypt	28 – 23	Croatia	Turkey	32 – 26	Italy
2018; Details	(Spain); Tarragona	Croatia	24 – 23	Tunisia	Spain	30 – 19	Turkey
2022; Details	(Algeria); Oran	Spain	28 – 27	Egypt	Serbia	34 – 29	North Macedonia
2026; Details	(Italy); Taranto	Egypt	31 – 29	Greece	Algeria	36 – 33	Portugal
2030; Details	(Kosovo); Pristina						

^n/a A round-robin tournament determined the final standings.

=== Men's medal table ===
Rank	Nation	Gold	Silver	Bronze	Total
1	Yugoslavia	5	0	0	5
2	Croatia	4	2	0	6
3	Spain	2	2	4	8
4	Egypt	2	2	0	4
5	Algeria	1	1	2	4
6	Serbia	1	0	1	2
7	France	0	3	1	4
8	Tunisia	0	2	4	6
9	Italy	0	2	1	3
10	Greece	0	1	0	1
11	Slovenia	0	0	1	1
11	Turkey	0	0	1	1
Totals (12 entries)		15	15	15	45

== Women's tournaments ==
Year	Host	Gold medal game			Bronze medal game		
Year	Host	Gold medalist	Score	Silver medalist	Bronze medalist	Score	Fourth place
1979; Details	(Socialist Federal Republic of Yugoslavia); Split	Yugoslavia		Spain	Italy	18 – 16	Algeria
1983; Details	(Morocco); Casablanca	Cancelled			Cancelled		
1987; Details	(Syria); Latakia	Italy	^{n/a}	France	Spain	^{n/a}	Syria
1991; Details	(Greece); Athens	Yugoslavia	^{n/a}	France	Spain	^{n/a}	Italy
1993; Details	(France); Languedoc-Roussillon	Croatia	^{n/a}	France	Spain	^{n/a}	Slovenia
1997; Details	(Italy); Bari	France		Croatia	Slovenia		FR Yugoslavia
2001; Details	(Tunisia); Tunis	France	26 – 21	Spain	Slovenia	32 – 26	FR Yugoslavia
2005; Details	(Spain); Almería	Spain	30 – 29	Serbia & Montenegro	Croatia	26 – 22	France
2009; Details	(Italy); Pescara	France	33 – 32; Overtime	Turkey	Montenegro	30 – 25	Spain
2013; Details	(Turkey); Mersin	Serbia	25 – 19	Slovenia	Croatia	25 – 24	Montenegro
2018; Details	(Spain); Tarragona	Spain	27 – 23	Montenegro	Slovenia	30 – 29	North Macedonia
2022; Details	(Algeria); Oran	Spain	29 – 25	Croatia	Serbia	26 – 22	Portugal
2026; Details	(Italy); Taranto	Italy	25-23	Tunisia	Greece	29-25	Algeria
2030; Details	(Kosovo); Pristina						

=== Women's medal table ===
Rank	Nation	Gold	Silver	Bronze	Total
1	France	3	3	0	6
2	Spain	3	2	3	8
3	Italy	2	0	1	3
4	Yugoslavia	2	0	0	2
5	Croatia	1	2	2	5
6	Serbia	1	1	1	3
7	Slovenia	0	1	3	4
8	Montenegro	0	1	1	2
9	Tunisia	0	1	0	1
9	Turkey	0	1	0	1
11	Greece	0	0	1	1
Totals (11 entries)		12	12	12	36

== All-time medal table ==
Rank	Nation	Gold	Silver	Bronze	Total
1	Yugoslavia	7	0	0	7
2	Spain	5	4	7	16
3	Croatia	5	4	2	11
4	France	3	6	1	10
5	Italy	2	2	2	6
6	Egypt	2	2	0	4
7	Serbia	2	1	2	5
8	Algeria	1	1	2	4
9	Tunisia	0	3	4	7
10	Slovenia	0	1	4	5
11	Greece	0	1	1	2
11	Montenegro	0	1	1	2
11	Turkey	0	1	1	2
Totals (13 entries)		27	27	27	81

== Results ==
- fr:Handball aux Jeux méditerranéens

== See also ==
- Mediterranean Handball Confederation
