= 2013 Copa de la Reina de Balonmano =

XXXIV Copa de la Reina

Tournament details
- Venue(s): Pavillón Municipal & Pavillón da Sangriña (in O Porriño & A Guarda host cities)
- Dates: 21 – 24 February
- Teams: 8

Final positions
- Champions: Bera Bera (3rd title)
- Runner-up: Ro'Casa ACE

Tournament statistics
- Matches played: 7
- Goals scored: 358 (51.14 per match)
- Attendance: 6,650 (950 per match)
- Top scorer(s): Davinia López 22

Awards
- Best player: Darly Zoqbi

The 2013 Copa de la Reina de Balonmano was the 34th edition of the Copa de la Reina de Balonmano. It took place mainly in O Porriño with two quarter-final matches taking place in A Guarda. The matches were held at Pavillón Municipal do Porriño, in O Porriño and Pavillón da Sangriña, in A Guarda, both in Province of Pontevedra Galicia, between 21 & 24 February 2013. It was hosted by Federación Galega de Balonmán, Xunta de Galicia, Deputación de Pontevedra & RFEBM. O Porriño and A Guarda hosted for first time the Copa de la Reina.

BM Bera Bera won its fourth title after defeating Ro'Casa ACE 25–24 in the final.

== Qualified teams ==
The qualified teams were the top eight teams on standings at midseason.

#	Team	P	W	D	L	G+	G−	Dif	Pts
1	Bera Bera	13	11	1	1	409	285	124	23
2	Ro'Casa ACE	13	10	2	1	380	335	45	22
3	Elche Mustang	13	11	0	2	381	315	66	22
4	Helvetia Alcobendas	13	9	2	2	371	329	42	20
5	Mecalia Atl. Guardés	13	9	1	3	356	301	55	19
6	Porriño	13	5	1	7	314	329	−15	11
7	Kukullaga Etxebarri	13	4	2	7	318	342	−24	10
8	Prosetecnisa-Zuazo	13	4	2	7	319	347	−28	10

== Venues ==
Pavillón Municipal do Porriño Capacity: 1,618	Pavillón da Sangriña Capacity: 600
O Porriño	A Guarda

== Matches ==
Quarter-finals
1	Bera Bera	25
8	Prosetecnisa-Zuazo	21
3	Elche Mustang	38
6	Porriño	29
5	Mecalia Atl. Guardés	26
4	Helvetia Alcobendas	22
7	Kukullaga Etxebarri	23
2	Ro'Casa ACE	29

Semi-finals
1	Bera Bera	23
3	Elche Mustang	20
5	Mecalia Atl. Guardés	23
2	Ro'Casa ACE	30

Final
1	Bera Bera	25
2	Ro'Casa ACE	24

=== Quarter-finals ===
==== In O Porriño ====
February 21; 18:30 (UTC+1)	Bera Bera	25–21	Prosetecnisa-Zuazo	Pavillón Municipal, O Porriño; Attendance: 350; Referees: Rodríguez Estévez, Rosendo López
February 21; 18:30 (UTC+1)	Pinedo 8	(11–13)	Yáñez 8	Pavillón Municipal, O Porriño; Attendance: 350; Referees: Rodríguez Estévez, Rosendo López
February 21; 18:30 (UTC+1)	5× (suspension)	Report	1× (suspension)	Pavillón Municipal, O Porriño; Attendance: 350; Referees: Rodríguez Estévez, Rosendo López

February 21; 20:30 (UTC+1)	Elche Mustang	38–29	Porriño	Pavillón Municipal, O Porriño; Attendance: 1,000; Referees: Casado Fernández, Vera Ávila
February 21; 20:30 (UTC+1)	Rodríguez 11	(21–12)	Doiro 8	Pavillón Municipal, O Porriño; Attendance: 1,000; Referees: Casado Fernández, Vera Ávila
February 21; 20:30 (UTC+1)	3× (suspension)	Report	3× (suspension)	Pavillón Municipal, O Porriño; Attendance: 1,000; Referees: Casado Fernández, Vera Ávila

==== In A Guarda ====
February 21; 18:30 (UTC+1)	Mecalia Atl. Guardés	26–22	Helvetia Alcobendas	A Sangriña, A Guarda; Attendance: 600; Referees: Ruiz González, Zapico Fernández
February 21; 18:30 (UTC+1)	Kurchankova 9	(15–11)	Arderius 7	A Sangriña, A Guarda; Attendance: 600; Referees: Ruiz González, Zapico Fernández
February 21; 18:30 (UTC+1)	3× (suspension)	Report	3× (suspension)	A Sangriña, A Guarda; Attendance: 600; Referees: Ruiz González, Zapico Fernández

February 21; 20:30 (UTC+1)	Kukullaga Etxebarri	23–29	Ro'Casa ACE	A Sangriña, A Guarda; Attendance: 500; Referees: Miranda Bedate, San Pedro Colorado
February 21; 20:30 (UTC+1)	Azcona 6	(13–12)	López, Rodríguez 7	A Sangriña, A Guarda; Attendance: 500; Referees: Miranda Bedate, San Pedro Colorado
February 21; 20:30 (UTC+1)	6× (suspension)	Report	2× (suspension)	A Sangriña, A Guarda; Attendance: 500; Referees: Miranda Bedate, San Pedro Colorado

=== Semifinals ===
February 23; 16:30 (UTC+1)	Bera Bera	23–20	Elche Mustang	Pavillón Municipal, O Porriño; Attendance: 1,200; Referees: San Pedro Colorado, Miranda Bedate
February 23; 16:30 (UTC+1)	Pinedo 8	(8–12)	Martínez 7	Pavillón Municipal, O Porriño; Attendance: 1,200; Referees: San Pedro Colorado, Miranda Bedate
February 23; 16:30 (UTC+1)	6× (suspension)	Report	3× (suspension)	Pavillón Municipal, O Porriño; Attendance: 1,200; Referees: San Pedro Colorado, Miranda Bedate

February 23; 19:00 (UTC+1)	Mecalia Atl. Guardés	23–30	Ro'Casa ACE	Pavillón Municipal, O Porriño; Attendance: 1,500; Referees: Ruiz González, Zapico Fernández
February 23; 19:00 (UTC+1)	Dapena 6	(10–18)	López 8	Pavillón Municipal, O Porriño; Attendance: 1,500; Referees: Ruiz González, Zapico Fernández
February 23; 19:00 (UTC+1)	2× (suspension)	Report	1× (suspension)	Pavillón Municipal, O Porriño; Attendance: 1,500; Referees: Ruiz González, Zapico Fernández

=== Final ===
February 24; 13:05 (UTC+1)	Bera Bera	25–24	Ro'Casa ACE	Pavillón Municipal, O Porriño; Attendance: 1,500; Referees: Casado Fernández, Vera Ávila
February 24; 13:05 (UTC+1)	Ziarsolo 10	(14–10)	López 7	Pavillón Municipal, O Porriño; Attendance: 1,500; Referees: Casado Fernández, Vera Ávila
February 24; 13:05 (UTC+1)	7× (suspension)	Report	3× (suspension)	Pavillón Municipal, O Porriño; Attendance: 1,500; Referees: Casado Fernández, Vera Ávila

2013 Copa de la Reina de Balonmano winners
(Basque Country (autonomous community))
Bera Bera
Third title

== Top goalscorers ==
Rank	Name	Team	Goals
1	Davinia López	Ro'Casa ACE	22
2	Elisabeth Pinedo	Bera Bera	20
3	Haridian Rodríguez	Ro'Casa ACE	18
4	Alba Albaladejo	Ro'Casa ACE	17
5	Mª Carmen Rodríguez	Elche Mustang	17
6	Matxalen Ziarsolo	Bera Bera	16
7	Alesia Kurchankova	Mecalia Atl. Guardés	13
8	Melania Falcón	Ro'Casa ACE	11
9	Alba Dapena	Mecalia Atl. Guardés	11
10	Ana Isabel Martínez	Elche Mustang	10

Source: own compilation

== See also ==
- 2012–13 División de Honor de Balonmano Femenino
