= 2014 Copa de la Reina de Balonmano =

XXXV Copa de la Reina

Tournament details
- Venue: Pabellón Amaya Valdemoro (in Alcobendas host cities)
- Dates: 14 – 16 March
- Teams: 8

Final positions
- Champions: Bera Bera (4th title)
- Runners-up: Ro'Casa ACE G.C.

Tournament statistics
- Matches played: 7
- Goals scored: 346 (49.43 per match)
- Attendance: 4,750 (679 per match)
- Top scorers: María Luján, 17

Awards
- Best player: Ana Temprano

The 2014 Copa de la Reina de Balonmano was the 35th edition of the Copa de la Reina de Balonmano. It took place in Alcobendas, city of the Community of Madrid, from 14 to 16 March. The matches were played at Pabellón Amaya Valdemoro, with 1,894 capacity seating. It was hosted by Federación Madrileña de Balonmano, Comunidad de Madrid, Alcobendas municipality & RFEBM. Alcobendas hosted Copa de la Reina for first time.

BM Bera Bera won its fourth title after defeating Ro'Casa ACE G.C. in the Final, being the second title in a row.

== Qualified teams ==
The qualified teams were the top eight teams on standings at midseason.

#	Team	P	W	D	L	G+	G−	Dif	Pts
1	Bera Bera	13	12	0	1	372	258	114	24
2	Helvetia Alcobendas	13	10	1	2	378	337	41	21
3	Ro'Casa ACE G.C.	13	10	0	3	381	327	54	20
4	Mecalia Atl. Guardés	13	9	0	4	322	310	12	18
5	Porriño	13	8	1	4	360	347	13	17
6	Elche Mustang	13	7	0	6	344	325	19	14
7	Prosetecnisa Zuazo	13	4	2	7	323	333	−10	10
8	Mar Alicante	13	5	0	8	313	330	−17	10

== Venue ==
Alcobendas within Spain

Pabellón Amaya Valdemoro
Capacity: 1,894
Alcobendas

== Matches ==
Quarter-finals
2	Helvetia Alcobendas	32
5	Porriño	25
6	Elche Mustang	22
3	Rocasa ACE G.C.	24
8	Mar Alicante	17
4	Mecalia Atl. Guardés	18
7	Prosetecnisa Zuazo	18
1	Bera Bera	29

Semi-finals
2	Helvetia Alcobendas	30
3	Rocasa ACE G.C.	37
4	Mecalia Atl. Guardés	21
1	Bera Bera	26

Final
3	Rocasa ACE G.C.	21
1	Bera Bera	26

=== Quarter-finals ===
14 March; 12:00 (UTC+1)	Mar Alicante	17–18	Mecalia Atl. Guardés	Pabellón Amaya Valdemoro, Alcobendas; Attendance: 650; Referees: Amigo Plaza, García de la Galana
14 March; 12:00 (UTC+1)	N Andreu 4	(6–7)	Doiro 5	Pabellón Amaya Valdemoro, Alcobendas; Attendance: 650; Referees: Amigo Plaza, García de la Galana
14 March; 12:00 (UTC+1)	2× (yellow card) 3× (suspension)	Report	3× (yellow card) 4× (suspension)	Pabellón Amaya Valdemoro, Alcobendas; Attendance: 650; Referees: Amigo Plaza, García de la Galana

14 March; 15:45 (UTC+1)	Elche Mustang	22–24	Ro'Casa ACE G.C.	Pabellón Amaya Valdemoro, Alcobendas; Attendance: 400; Referees: Hermoso del Amo, Monjo Ortega
14 March; 15:45 (UTC+1)	Sempere 7	(12–10)	Albaladejo 5	Pabellón Amaya Valdemoro, Alcobendas; Attendance: 400; Referees: Hermoso del Amo, Monjo Ortega
14 March; 15:45 (UTC+1)	1× (yellow card) 6× (suspension) 1× (red card)	Report	3× (yellow card) 4× (suspension)	Pabellón Amaya Valdemoro, Alcobendas; Attendance: 400; Referees: Hermoso del Amo, Monjo Ortega

14 March; 18:00 (UTC+1)	Helvetia Alcobendas	32–25	Porriño	Pabellón Amaya Valdemoro, Alcobendas; Attendance: 900; Referees: Casado Fernández, Vera Ávila
14 March; 18:00 (UTC+1)	Ausás 7	(16–8)	Cacheda 7	Pabellón Amaya Valdemoro, Alcobendas; Attendance: 900; Referees: Casado Fernández, Vera Ávila
14 March; 18:00 (UTC+1)	2× (yellow card) 6× (suspension) 1× (red card)	Report	3× (yellow card) 3× (suspension)	Pabellón Amaya Valdemoro, Alcobendas; Attendance: 900; Referees: Casado Fernández, Vera Ávila

14 March; 20:15 (UTC+1)	Prosetecnisa Zuazo	18–29	Bera Bera	Pabellón Amaya Valdemoro, Alcobendas; Attendance: 500; Referees: Fernández Molina, Murillo Castro
14 March; 20:15 (UTC+1)	Yáñez 10	(10–18)	four players 5	Pabellón Amaya Valdemoro, Alcobendas; Attendance: 500; Referees: Fernández Molina, Murillo Castro
14 March; 20:15 (UTC+1)	3× (yellow card) 4× (suspension)	Report	3× (yellow card) 5× (suspension) 1× (red card)	Pabellón Amaya Valdemoro, Alcobendas; Attendance: 500; Referees: Fernández Molina, Murillo Castro

=== Semifinals ===
15 March; 13:30 (UTC+1)	Helvetia Alcobendas	30–37	Ro'Casa ACE G.C.	Pabellón Amaya Valdemoro, Alcobendas; Attendance: 1,000; Referees: Fernández Molina, Murillo Castro
15 March; 13:30 (UTC+1)	Arderius, T Francés 7	(18–20)	D López 8	Pabellón Amaya Valdemoro, Alcobendas; Attendance: 1,000; Referees: Fernández Molina, Murillo Castro
15 March; 13:30 (UTC+1)	2× (yellow card) 4× (suspension)	Report	3× (yellow card) 6× (suspension)	Pabellón Amaya Valdemoro, Alcobendas; Attendance: 1,000; Referees: Fernández Molina, Murillo Castro

15 March; 16:00 (UTC+1)	Mecalia Atl. Guardés	21–26	Bera Bera	Pabellón Amaya Valdemoro, Alcobendas; Attendance: 500; Referees: Álvarez Mata, Bustamante López
15 March; 16:00 (UTC+1)	Doiro, Kurchankova 5	(10–12)	Menéndez, Pinedo 5	Pabellón Amaya Valdemoro, Alcobendas; Attendance: 500; Referees: Álvarez Mata, Bustamante López
15 March; 16:00 (UTC+1)	2× (yellow card) 2× (suspension)	Report	3× (yellow card) 4× (suspension)	Pabellón Amaya Valdemoro, Alcobendas; Attendance: 500; Referees: Álvarez Mata, Bustamante López

=== Final ===
16 March; 13:00 (UTC+1)	Ro'Casa ACE G.C.	21–26	Bera Bera	Pabellón Amaya Valdemoro, Alcobendas; Attendance: 800; Referees: Álvarez Mata, Bustamante López
16 March; 13:00 (UTC+1)	Luján, H Rodríguez 6	(10–11)	Ziarsolo 8	Pabellón Amaya Valdemoro, Alcobendas; Attendance: 800; Referees: Álvarez Mata, Bustamante López
16 March; 13:00 (UTC+1)	2× (yellow card) 3× (suspension)	Report	3× (yellow card) 3× (suspension)	Pabellón Amaya Valdemoro, Alcobendas; Attendance: 800; Referees: Álvarez Mata, Bustamante López

2014 Copa de la Reina de Balonmano winners
(Basque Country (autonomous community))
Bera Bera
Fourth title

== Top goalscorers ==
Rank	Name	Team	Goals
1	María Luján	Ro'Casa ACE G.C.	17
2	Davinia López	Ro'Casa ACE G.C.	14
3	Elisabeth Pinedo	BM Bera Bera	14
4	Mónica Ausás	Helvetia Alcobendas	13
5	Teresa Francés	Helvetia Alcobendas	13
6	Alba Albaladejo	Ro'Casa ACE G.C.	13
7	Haridian Rodríguez	Ro'Casa ACE G.C.	12

Source: own compilation

== See also ==
- 2013–14 División de Honor Femenina de Balonmano
