= 2012 Copa de la Reina de Balonmano =

The 2012 Copa de la Reina de Balonmano was the 33rd edition of the Spanish women's handball national cup, running between 12 and 15 April 2012 in Altea. SD Itxako defeated BM Bera Bera in the final to win its third title in a row.

== Knockout stage ==
Quarter-finals
April 12 - Costa Blanca
Bera Bera	30
Elche	22
April 12 - Costa Blanca
Murcia	21
Alcobendas	25
April 12 - Costa Blanca
Remudas	24
Mar Alicante	25
April 12 - Costa Blanca
Sagunto	22
Itxako	37

Semi-finals
April 14 - Costa Blanca
Bera Bera	26
Alcobendas	21
April 14 - Costa Blanca
Mar Alicante	17
Itxako	32

Final
March 15 - Costa Blanca
Bera Bera	26
Itxako	35

=== Quarter-finals ===
April 12; 12:00 UTC+1	Murcia	21–25	Alcobendas	Costa Blanca, Altea; Attendance: 500; Referees: Peris & Freile
April 12; 12:00 UTC+1	Gina, Z. González, 7	(14–14)	M. González, 8	Costa Blanca, Altea; Attendance: 500; Referees: Peris & Freile
April 12; 12:00 UTC+1	6× (suspension)	Report	4× (suspension)	Costa Blanca, Altea; Attendance: 500; Referees: Peris & Freile

April 12; 16:00 UTC+1	Sagunto	22–37	Itxako	Costa Blanca, Altea; Attendance: 500; Referees: García & Marín
April 12; 16:00 UTC+1	Alonso, 7	(9–15)	Cabral, Martín, 5	Costa Blanca, Altea; Attendance: 500; Referees: García & Marín
April 12; 16:00 UTC+1	3× (suspension)	Report	6× (suspension)	Costa Blanca, Altea; Attendance: 500; Referees: García & Marín

April 12; 18:00 UTC+1	Bera Bera	30–22	Elche	Costa Blanca, Altea; Attendance: 1,000; Referees: Fdez. Pérez & Gca. Rodríguez
April 12; 18:00 UTC+1	Altuna, 5	(13–8)	L. González, 11	Costa Blanca, Altea; Attendance: 1,000; Referees: Fdez. Pérez & Gca. Rodríguez
April 12; 18:00 UTC+1	5× (suspension)	Report	1× (suspension)	Costa Blanca, Altea; Attendance: 1,000; Referees: Fdez. Pérez & Gca. Rodríguez

April 12; 20:00 UTC+1	Remudas	24–25	Mar Alicante	Costa Blanca, Altea; Attendance: 1,000; Referees: Amigó Plaza & Espadas García
April 12; 20:00 UTC+1	H. Rodríguez, 7	(14–11)	Krnić, 11	Costa Blanca, Altea; Attendance: 1,000; Referees: Amigó Plaza & Espadas García
April 12; 20:00 UTC+1	6× (suspension)	Report	4× (suspension)	Costa Blanca, Altea; Attendance: 1,000; Referees: Amigó Plaza & Espadas García

=== Semifinals ===
April 14; 16:00 UTC+1	Bera Bera	26–21	Alcobendas	Costa Blanca, Altea; Attendance: 1,500; Referees: Fdez. Pérez & Gca. Rodríguez
April 14; 16:00 UTC+1	B. Fernández, 8	(12–12)	M. López, 7	Costa Blanca, Altea; Attendance: 1,500; Referees: Fdez. Pérez & Gca. Rodríguez
April 14; 16:00 UTC+1	2× (suspension) 1× (red card)	Report	3× (suspension)	Costa Blanca, Altea; Attendance: 1,500; Referees: Fdez. Pérez & Gca. Rodríguez

April 14; 20:00 UTC+1	Mar Alicante	17–32	Itxako	Costa Blanca, Altea; Attendance: 1,000; Referees: Amigó Plaza & Espadas García
April 14; 20:00 UTC+1	Gracia, I. Ortuño, 4	(7–16)	Cabral, Pinedo, 5	Costa Blanca, Altea; Attendance: 1,000; Referees: Amigó Plaza & Espadas García
April 14; 20:00 UTC+1	3× (suspension)	Report	4× (suspension)	Costa Blanca, Altea; Attendance: 1,000; Referees: Amigó Plaza & Espadas García

=== Final ===
April 15; 11:00 UTC+1	Bera Bera	26–35	Itxako	Costa Blanca, Altea; Attendance: 1,000; Referees: Gca. Serradilla & Marín Lorente
April 15; 11:00 UTC+1	B. Fernández, 7	(11–16)	Barbosa, 11	Costa Blanca, Altea; Attendance: 1,000; Referees: Gca. Serradilla & Marín Lorente
April 15; 11:00 UTC+1	3× (suspension)	Report	2× (suspension)	Costa Blanca, Altea; Attendance: 1,000; Referees: Gca. Serradilla & Marín Lorente
