= 2013–14 División de Honor Femenina de Balonmano =

Spanish women's handball season

División de Honor
- Season: 2013–14
- Champions: Bera Bera
- Relegated: Mar Alicante & Kukullaga Etxebarri
- EHF Cup: Bera Bera & Rocasa ACE G.C.
- EHF Cup Winners' Cup: Mecalia Atl. Guardés
- Matches: 182
- Goals: 9,486 (52.12 per match)
- Top goalscorer: Tania Yáñez, 220
- Biggest home win: Prosetecnisa Zuazo 36–17 Canyamelar Valencia
- Biggest away win: Kukullaga Etxebarri 15–40 Bera Bera
- Highest scoring: Helvetia Alcobendas 41–31 Kukullaga Etxebarri

The División de Honor Femenina 2013–14 was the 57th season of women's handball top flight in Spain since its establishment. Itxako, four times champion, were the defending champion but the club was disbanded during 2013's summer. The season began on 13 September, 2013 and the last matchday was played on 17 May, 2014. A total of 14 teams took part the league, 11 of which had already contested in the 2012–13 season, 1 new created team and two of which were promoted from the División de Plata 2012–13.

Bera Bera won its second title in a row. Bera Bera won the championship on 10 May with one matchday remaining left to play. Further, regarding to European competitions for next season; Bera Bera (originally qualified for EHF Champions League although later declined to take part in the competition due to financial constraints) and Rocasa ACE G.C. qualified to 2014–15 EHF Cup and Mecalia Atlético Guardés to EHF Cup Winners' Cup.

== Promotion and relegation ==
Teams promoted from 2012–13 División de Plata

- Adesal Córdoba
- Aula Cultural Viveros Herol

Teams relegated to 2014–15 División de Plata

- Mar Alicante
- Kukullaga Etxebarri

New team

- Canyamelar Valencia

== Teams ==
2013–14 División de Honor teams
Canary Islands

Team	City	Stadium	Capacity
Bera Bera	San Sebastián	Bidebieta	1,000
Elche Mustang	Elche	Poliesportiu de Carrús	800
Rocasa ACE G.C.	Telde	Antonio Moreno	800
Helvetia Alcobendas	Alcobendas	Los Sueños	1,000
Mecalia Atl. Guardés	A Guarda	A Sangriña	1,500
Porriño	O Porriño	Polideportivo Municipal	1,600
Cleba León	León	Palacio de los Deportes	6,500
Prosetecnisa Zuazo	Barakaldo	Lasesarre	2,576
Mar Alicante	Alicante	Pabellón Agustinos	1,868
Canyamelar Valencia	Valencia	El Cabanyal	1,200
Kukullaga Etxebarri	Etxebarri	Polideportivo Municipal	1,400
Castelldefels	Castelldefels	Can Vinader	800
Adesal Córdoba	Córdoba	La Fuensanta	600
Aula Cultural Viveros Herol	Valladolid	Miriam Blasco	400

== Final standings ==
	Team	Pld	W	D	L	GF	GA	Diff	Pts
1	Bera Bera	26	23	1	2	739	533	206	47
2	Rocasa ACE G.C.	26	21	2	3	770	655	115	44
3	Helvetia Alcobendas	26	18	3	5	751	678	73	39
4	Mecalia Atl. Guardés	26	16	0	10	654	624	30	32
5	Porriño	26	13	2	11	696	707	−11	28
6	Elche Mustang	26	13	1	12	709	665	44	27
7	Aula Cultural Viveros Herol	26	11	2	13	688	725	−37	24
8	Prosetecnisa Zuazo	26	10	2	14	661	660	1	22
9	Canyamelar Valencia	26	9	3	14	636	703	−67	21
10	Cleba León	26	8	3	15	647	688	−41	19
11	Mar Alicante	26	8	3	15	612	658	−46	19
12	Castelldefels	26	8	1	17	642	720	−78	17
13	Adesal Córdoba	26	6	1	19	656	726	−78	13
14	Kukullaga Etxebarri	26	5	2	19	625	744	−119	12

EHF Champions League
EHF Cup
EHF Cup Winners' Cup
Relegated to División de Plata

2013–14 División de Honor Femenina winners
(Basque Country (autonomous community))
Bera Bera
Second title

== Top goalscorers ==
Rank	Name	Team	Goals	GP	GPG
1	(Spain) Tania Yáñez	Prosetecnisa Zuazo	220	26	8.46
2	(Spain) Raquel Caño	Cleba León	186	26	7.15
3	(Spain) Amaia González	Aula Cultural Viveros Herol	178	26	6.85
4	(Spain) Estela Doiro	Mecalia Atl. Guardés	173	25	6.92
5	(Spain) Teresa Francés	Helvetia Alcobendas	159	24	6.62
6	(Spain) Elisabeth Pinedo	Bera Bera	154	25	6.16
7	(Spain) África Sempere	Elche Mustang	147	26	5.65
8	(Russia) Daria Ilina	Cleba León	141	23	6.13
9	(Spain) Silvia Arderius	Helvetia Alcobendas	141	25	5.64
10	(Spain) Inés Hernández	Adesal Córdoba	132	25	5.25

== See also ==
- Liga ASOBAL 2013–14
