= Valencian Community Handball Cup =

The Valencian Community Handball Cup (Spanish: Copa de Balonmano Comunidad Valenciana) is a Spanish annual knockout tournament organized by the Valencian Handball Federation confronting the leading men's and women's handball team in the Valencian Community. It was first held in 2010.

== List of finals ==
=== Men's tournament ===
| Year | Champion | Score | Runner-up | Semifinalist/s |
|---|---|---|---|---|
| 2010 | Torrevieja | 26–25 | Puerto Sagunto | Sant Joan, Maristas Algemesí |
| 2011 | Puerto Sagunto | 31–22 | Benidorm | Maristas Algemesí, Torrevieja |
| 2012 | Puerto Sagunto | 32–31 | Benidorm | Florida Universitaria |

=== Women's tournament ===
| Year | Champion | Score | Runner-up | Semifinalists |
|---|---|---|---|---|
| 2010 | Mar Alicante | 22–21 | Monòver | Sagunto, Elda |
| 2011 | Sagunto | 28–23 | Mar Alicante | Marítim, Elda |
| 2012 | Elche | 30–25 | Marítim | Mar Alicante, Castellón |
