= 2012–13 División de Honor Femenina de Balonmano =

Spanish women's handball league season

División de Honor
- Season: 2012–13
- Champions: Bera Bera
- Relegated: Castelldefels & Castro Urdiales
- Matches: 182
- Goals: 9,662 (53.09 per match)
- Top goalscorer: Anabel Mateo, 213
- Biggest home win: BM Bera Bera 46–20 C.Le.Ba
- Biggest away win: Prosetecnisa Zuazo 18–35 Bera Bera
- Highest scoring: Castelldefels 34–37 Itxako

The División de Honor Femenina 2012–13 was the 56th season of women's handball top flight in Spain since its establishment. Itxako four times champion, is the defending champion. The season began on Saturday, 8 September 2012. The last matchday was played on Saturday, 11 May 2013. A total of 14 teams contested the league, 10 of which had already contested in the 2011–12 season, and four of which were promoted from the División de Plata 2011–12.

Bera Bera won their first División de Honor title ever. Bera Bera clinched its first title by winning in the last matchday to Castro Urdiales 18–32.

== Promotion and relegation ==
Teams promoted from 2011–12 División de Plata

- Valencia Aicequip
- Prosetecnisa Zuazo
- Mecalia Atl. Guardés
- Castelldefels

Teams relegated to 2011–12 División de Plata

- Elda
- UCAM Murcia
- Gijón

Teams dissolved

- BM Sagunto

== Teams ==
2012–13 División de Honor Femenina teams

Team	City	Stadium	Capacity
Asfi Itxako	Estella-Lizarra	Tierra Estella-Lizarrerria	2,000
Bera Bera	San Sebastián	Bidebieta	1,000
Castelldefels	Castelldefels	Can Vinader	800
Castro Urdiales	Castro Urdiales	Pachi Torre	500
C.Le.Ba	León	Palacio de los Deportes	6,500
Elche Mustang	Elche	Polideportivo de Carrús	800
Helvetia Alcobendas	Alcobendas	Los Sueños	1,000
Kukullaga Etxebarri	Etxebarri	Polideportivo Municipal	1,400
Mar Alicante	Alicante	Pabellón Agustinos	1,868
Mecalia Atl. Guardés	A Guarda	Pabellón Agustinos	3,000
Porriño	O Porriño	Polideportivo Municipal	1,600
Rocasa ACE G.C.	Telde	Antonio Moreno	800
Valencia Aicequip	Valencia	El Cabanyal	1,200
Prosetecnisa Zuazo	Barakaldo	Lasesarre	2,576

== Standings ==
	Team	Pld	W	D	L	GF	GA	Diff	Pts
1	Bera Bera	26	23	1	2	804	546	258	47
2	Elche Mustang	26	22	1	3	747	621	126	45
3	Rocasa ACE G.C.	26	20	2	4	776	690	86	42
4	Helvetia Alcobendas	26	18	2	6	731	652	79	38
5	Mecalia Atl. Guardés	26	17	1	8	682	620	62	35
6	Porriño	26	12	3	11	679	665	14	27
7	C.Le.Ba	26	10	2	14	697	742	−45	22
8	Prosetecnisa Zuazo	26	8	4	14	642	684	−42	20
9	Mar Alicante	26	7	5	14	663	730	−67	19
10	Valencia Aicequip	26	8	3	15	641	724	−83	19
11	Itxako	26	8	1	17	734	792	−58	17
12	Kukullaga	26	6	4	16	639	701	−62	16
13	Castelldefels	26	5	5	16	666	727	−61	15
14	Castro Urdiales	26	1	0	25	561	768	−207	2

EHF Champions League
EHF Cup
EHF Cup Winners' Cup
Relegated to División de Plata

2012–13 División de Honor Femenina winners
(Basque Country (autonomous community))
Bera Bera
First title

== Top goalscorers ==
Rank	Name	Team	Goals	GP	GPG
1	(Spain) Anabel Mateo	Mar Alicante	213	26	8.19
2	(Spain) Tania Yáñez	Prosetecnisa Zuazo	208	25	8.32
3	(Spain) Raquel Caño	C.Le.Ba	178	25	7.12
4	(Spain) Davinia López	Rocasa ACE G.C.	174	26	6.69
5	(Spain) Teresa Francés	Helvetia Alcobendas	164	24	6.83
6	(Spain) Ana Isabel Martínez	Elche Mustang	160	25	6.4
7	(Spain) Matxalen Ziarsolo	Bera Bera	148	25	5.92
8	(Spain) Mireia Paya	Valencia Aicequip	146	25	5.84
9	(Spain) Estela Doiro	Porriño	145	23	6.3
10	(Belarus) Alesia Kurchankova	Mecalia Atl. Guardés	136	24	5.67

== See also ==
- Liga ASOBAL 2012–13
