= Esperanza López Jiménez =

Spanish handball player (born 1992)

Espe López
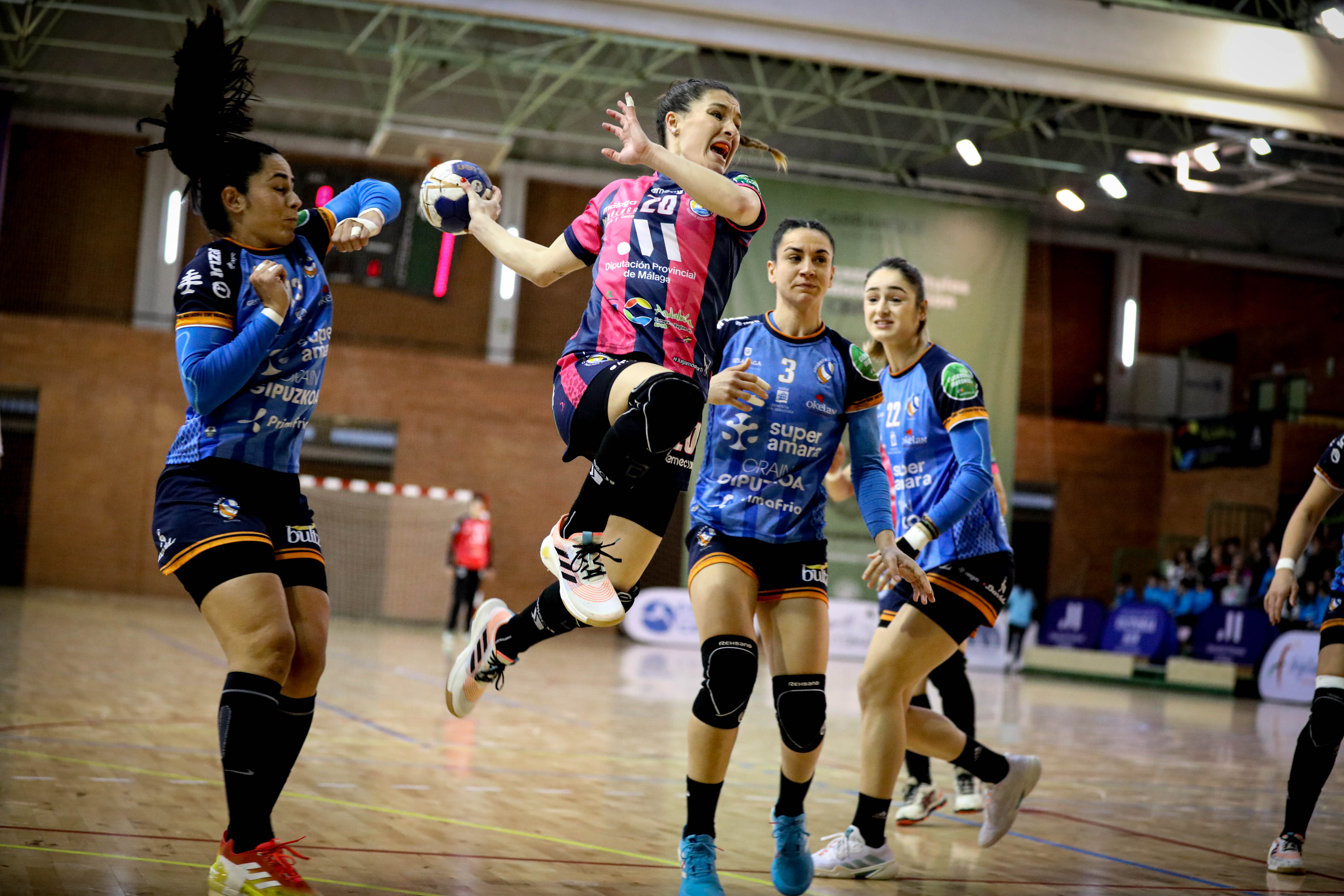

Personal information
- Full name: Esperanza López Jiménez
- Nationality: Spanish
- Born: 4 April 1992 (age 34) Málaga, Spain
- Height: 1.58 m (5 ft 2 in)

Sport
- Sport: Handball
- Position: Right Back
- Current club: CBF Málaga Costa del Sol
- Number: 20

Senior clubs
- Years: Team
- 2010–11: Balonmano Monovar
- 2011–15: CBF Málaga Costa del Sol
- 2015–18: Adesal de Córdoba
- 2018–: CBF Málaga Costa del Sol

Esperanza López Jiménez, also known as Espe López, (born 4 April 1992) is a Spanish handball player who plays as a right back for Málaga Costa del Sol, she has been a member of the Spanish national youth team.

== Career ==
Raised in the prolific youth academy of Colegio Puertosol in Málaga, where she began playing at the age of 6, she moved at 18 to the Valencian team Monóvar Urbacasas. There, she played for one season and qualified for the final phase of the Queen's Cup. After that, she returned to Málaga in the 2011 season to play with the Malaga team in the Silver Honor Division.

Esperanza moved to Adesal de Córdoba in the 2015 season, where she played for three seasons and achieved promotion for the Fuensanta team. She returned to the malacitanan team in the 2018–2019 season. She was a key player in the team's promotion to the Honor Division in 2014 and continues to be a regular starter in Suso Gallardo's initial seven, season after season.

She is an unconventional frontline player (due to her height) but her speed in feinting and quick passing often creates dangerous situations in the attack, resulting in direct shots from six meters or advantageous passes to her teammates.

Together with Silvia Arderius and Estela Doiro, she forms part of the shortest frontline in the entire Spanish Honor Division and one of the highest scoring.

As a member of the legendary Malaga team between 2020 and 2023, she won the League Championship (2022-23 Liga Guerreras Iberdrola), the EHF Cup (and was runner-up the following year), twice won the Queen's Cup (Copa de la Reina, in 2020 and 2022), and was the Spanish Supercup champion.

=== Clubs ===
- 2010 – 11: Balonmano Monovar
- 2011 – 15: Málaga Costa del Sol
- 2015 – 18: Adesal de Córdoba
- 2018 – : Málaga Costa del Sol

==== Statistical Data ====
League		Cup		European tournaments	
Matches	Goals	Matches	Goals	Matches	Goals
143	425	19	75	28	80

== Achievements ==
- 1x Liga Guerreras Iberdrola (2023)
- 2x Queen's Cup (Copa de la Reina de balonmano 2020, 2022)
- 1x Spanish Supercup (Supercopa de España 2021)
- 1x EHF European Cup (2021)

=== Personal achievements ===
- Best Right Back in the Guerreras Iberdrola League 2019–20
- Ideal Seven of the 2019–20 season

== Personal life ==
She has a twin sister, fellow player Soledad López, and in a 2018 interview expressed her dream of winning the Copa de la Reina. They faced each other for the first time in 2012 season. She would like to stay connected to handball as a coach after she stops playing.

She married with Nacho del Castillo, another Spanish handball player from Córdoba.
