= Mercedes Castellanos =

Spanish handball player (born 1988)

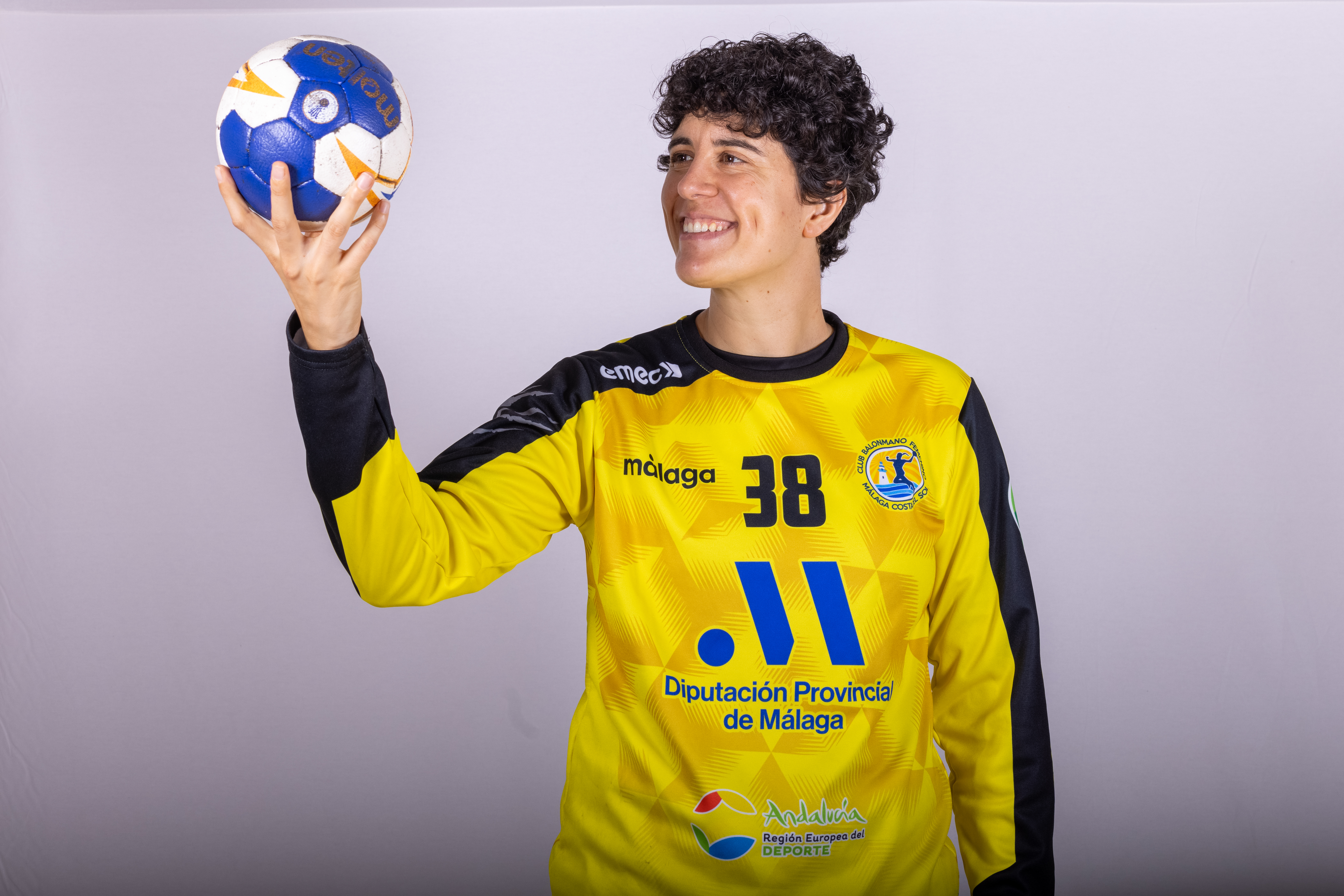

Personal information
- Full name: Mercedes Castellanos Soánez
- Nationality: Spanish
- Born: 21 July 1988 (age 38) Ciudad Real, Spain
- Height: 1.84 m (6 ft 0 in)

Sport
- Sport: Handball
- Position: Goalkeeper
- Current club: CBF Málaga Costa del Sol
- Number: 38

Senior clubs
- Years: Team
- 2006–2011: BM Alcobendas
- 2011–2012: Mar Alicante
- 2012–2015: Le Havre AC
- 2015–2017: BM Zuazo
- 2017–2020: BM Bera Bera
- 2020–: CBF Málaga Costa del Sol
National team
Years	Team	Apps	(Gls)
2008–	Spain	106	(4)
Medal record
Mediterranean Games
Gold medal – first place	2018 Tarragona	Team
- Updated on 14 November 2024

Mercedes Castellanos Soánez (Note: In this Spanish name, the first or paternal surname is Castellanos and the second or maternal family name is Soánez.) (born 21 July 1988), known as Merche Castellanos, is a Spanish female handball player for CBF Málaga Costa del Sol and the Spanish national team.

== Career ==
Merche Castellanos is a renowned Spanish handball goalkeeper currently playing for Costa del Sol Málaga in the Liga Guerreras Iberdrola. She has been a key player for various teams, including Alcobendas, Mar Alicante, Le Havre (France), Balonmano Zuazo, and Bera Bera, where she won multiple titles including two Spanish Leagues, two Queen's Cups, and one Spanish Supercup.

In 2020, she left San Sebastian and joined Rincón Fertilidad Málaga, winning the Queen's Cup, the Spanish Supercup, and the EHF European Cup in her first season. She played a decisive role in leading her team to their first league title in 2023.

== Achievements ==
- División de Honor:
  - Winner: 2018, 2020, 2023
- Queen's Cup:
  - Winner: 2019, 2020, 2022
- Spanish Super Cup:
  - Winner 2020, 2021
- EHF European Cup:
  - Winner: 2021
  - Second place: 2022

=== Individual awards ===
- MVP Final Queen's Cup: 2021–22
- Best Goalkeeper Liga Guerreras Iberdrola: 2021–22

== National team achievements ==
Merche Castellanos has been a significant player for the Spanish national team, contributing to their gold medal victory at the 2018 Mediterranean Games in Tarragona. She was part of the squad for the 2022 European Championships but had to withdraw due to injury.

=== Tokyo 2020 Olympics ===
Alongside Silvia Navarro, Merche Castellanos represented Spain as a goalkeeper in the 2020 Tokyo Olympics.

== Legacy ==
In recognition of her contributions, the city of Ciudad Real named sports facilities after her: Mercedes Castellanos Sports Courts.
