= Leire Aramendia =

Spanish handball player (born 1993)

Personal information
- Full name: Leire Aramendia Yerro
- Nationality: Spanish
- Born: 23 April 1993 (age 33) Lerín, Spain

Sport
- Sport: Handball
- Position: Left wing
- Current club: BM Bera Bera
- Number: 5

Senior clubs
- Years: Team
- 2009–2011: SD Itxako
- 2011–2016: BM Alcobendas
- 2016–: BM Bera Bera
National team
Years	Team	Apps	(Gls)
2018–	Spain	2	(3)

Leire Aramendia Yerro (born 23 April 1993) is a Spanish handballer for Super Amara Bera Bera and the Spanish national team.

== Achievements ==
- Spanish League:
  - Winner: 2009/10, 2010/11, 2017/18
- Copa de la Reina de Balonmano:
  - Winner: 2009/10, 2010/11
  - Runner-up: 2017/18
