= Mihaela Ciobanu =

Spanish handball player (born 1973)

Personal information
- Nationality: Romanian; Spanish
- Born: 30 January 1973 (age 53) Bucharest, Romania
- Height: 1.69 m (5 ft 7 in)

Sport
- Sport: Handball
- Position: Goalkeeper

Senior clubs
- Years: Team
- 1998–2006: CB Mar Alicante
- 2006–2007: BM Bera Bera
- 2007–2009: La Unión Ribarroja
- 2009–2010: CB Elche Mustang
- 2011–2012: BM Alcobendas
National team
Years	Team	Apps	(Gls)
1989–2002	Romania	79	(0)
2008–2012	Spain	80	(0)
Medal record
Representing Spain
Women's handball
Olympic Games
Bronze medal – third place	2012 London	Team
World Championship
Bronze medal – third place	2011 Brazil	Team
European Championship
Silver medal – second place	2008 Macedonia	Team

Mihaela Ciobanu (born 30 January 1973) is a retired Romanian-born Spanish handball goalkeeper, who played on the Spanish women's national team.

She was part of the Spanish team at the 2008 European Women's Handball Championship, where the Spanish team reached the final, after defeating Germany in the semifinal.

She competed at the 2011 World Women's Handball Championship in Brazil, where the Spanish team placed third. A year later she was part of the Spanish team that finished 4th at the 2009 World Women's Handball Championship.

She took also part at the 2012 Summer Olympics, where Spanish team won the bronze medal, after defeating South Korea. In that game Ciobanu saved four seven-meter penalty shots.

On October 1, 2018, she signed a 2-year contract with CSM București for the position of goalkeeping coach.
