= Vanesa Amorós =

Spanish handball player (born 1982)

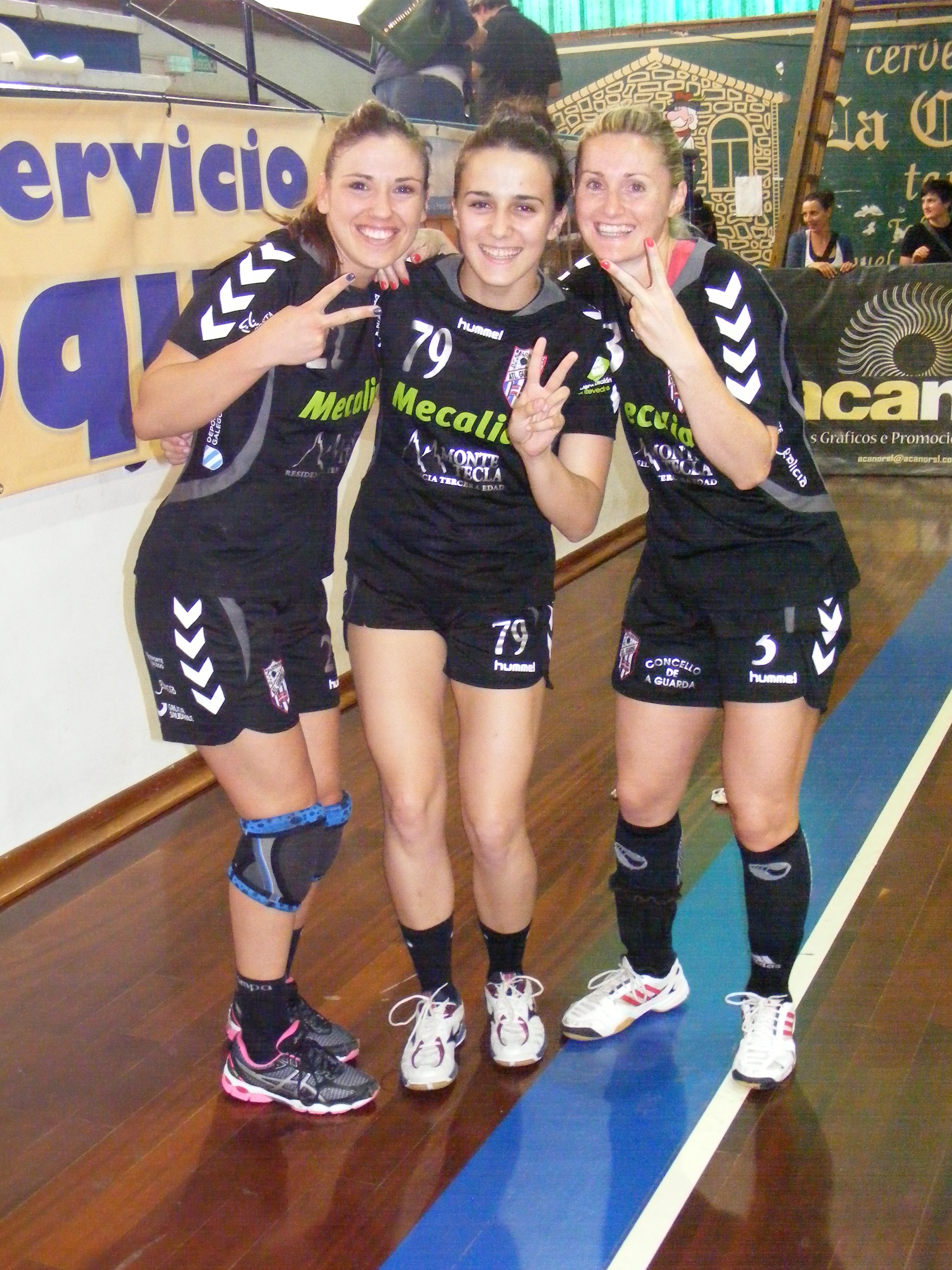
- Vanesa (right) with Laura Morais and Carmen Martín.

Personal information
- Full name: Vanesa Amorós Quiles
- Nationality: Spanish
- Born: 7 December 1982 (age 43)
- Height: 1.67 m (5 ft 6 in)

Sport
- Sport: Handball
- Position: Left wing

Senior clubs
- Years: Team
- 1997–2006: CB Elche
- 2006–2011: CBF Elda
- 2011–2012: CB Mar Alicante
- 2012–2014: CB Atlético Guardés
National team
| Years | Team | Apps | (Gls) |
| 2003–2013 | Spain | 111 | (97) |
Medal record
Representing Spain
Olympic Games
| Bronze medal – third place | 2012 London | Team |
World Championship
| Bronze medal – third place | 2011 Brazil | Team |

Vanesa Amorós Quiles (born 7 December 1982 in Elche, Alicante province, Valencian Community, Spain) is a former Spanish handball player. She played for the Spanish national team, and competed at the 2004 Summer Olympics in Athens. and the 2012 Summer Olympics in London, where the Spanish team won the bronze medal.

She competed at the 2011 World Women's Handball Championship in Brazil, where the Spanish team placed third.

Her last club was Mecalia Atlético Guardés, a club of A Guarda, Galicia, Spain.
