= Nora Azurmendi =

Spanish handballer (born 1995)

Personal information
- Full name: Nora Azurmendi Arzallus
- Nationality: Spanish
- Born: 10 October 1995 (age 31) San Sebastián, Spain
- Height: 1.79 m (5 ft 10 in)

Sport
- Sport: Handball
- Position: Left back
- Current club: BM Bera Bera
- Number: 18

Senior clubs
- Years: Team
- 2012–2013: BM Bera Bera
- 2013–2017: BM Alcobendas
- 2017–: BM Bera Bera

Nora Azurmendi Arzallus (born 10 October 1995) is a Spanish handballer for Super Amara Bera Bera.

== Achievements ==
- Spanish League:
  - Winner: 2012/13, 2017/18
- Copa de la Reina de Balonmano:
  - Winner: 2012/13
  - Runner-up: 2017/18
