= María Muñoz Juan =

Spanish handball player (born 1984)

María Muñoz
Personal information
- Full name: María Muñoz Juan
- Nationality: Spanish
- Born: 21 September 1984 (age 42) Valencia, Spain
- Height: 1.83 m (6 ft 0 in)

Sport
- Sport: Handball
- Position: Goalkeeper

Senior clubs
- Years: Team
- 2000–2003: Milar L'Eliana
- 2004–2006: Cementos la Union Ribarroja
- 2006–2007: CB Mar Alicante
- 2008–2009: Cementos la Union Ribarroja
- 2009–2010: BM Mar Sagunto
- 2010–2012: CB Castro Urdiales
- 2012–2013: Union Mios Biganos/Bègles
- 2013–2018: ES Besançon
- 2018–2023: Palente Besançon HB
National team
Years	Team	Apps	(Gls)
2013–2013	Spain	11	(0)

María Muñoz Juan (born 21 September 1984) is a former Spanish female handballer. She was member of the Spanish national team.

In 2012, she left the Spanish league to sign for the French team Union Mios Biganos/Bègles.
