= Patricia Elorza =

Spanish handball player (born 1984)

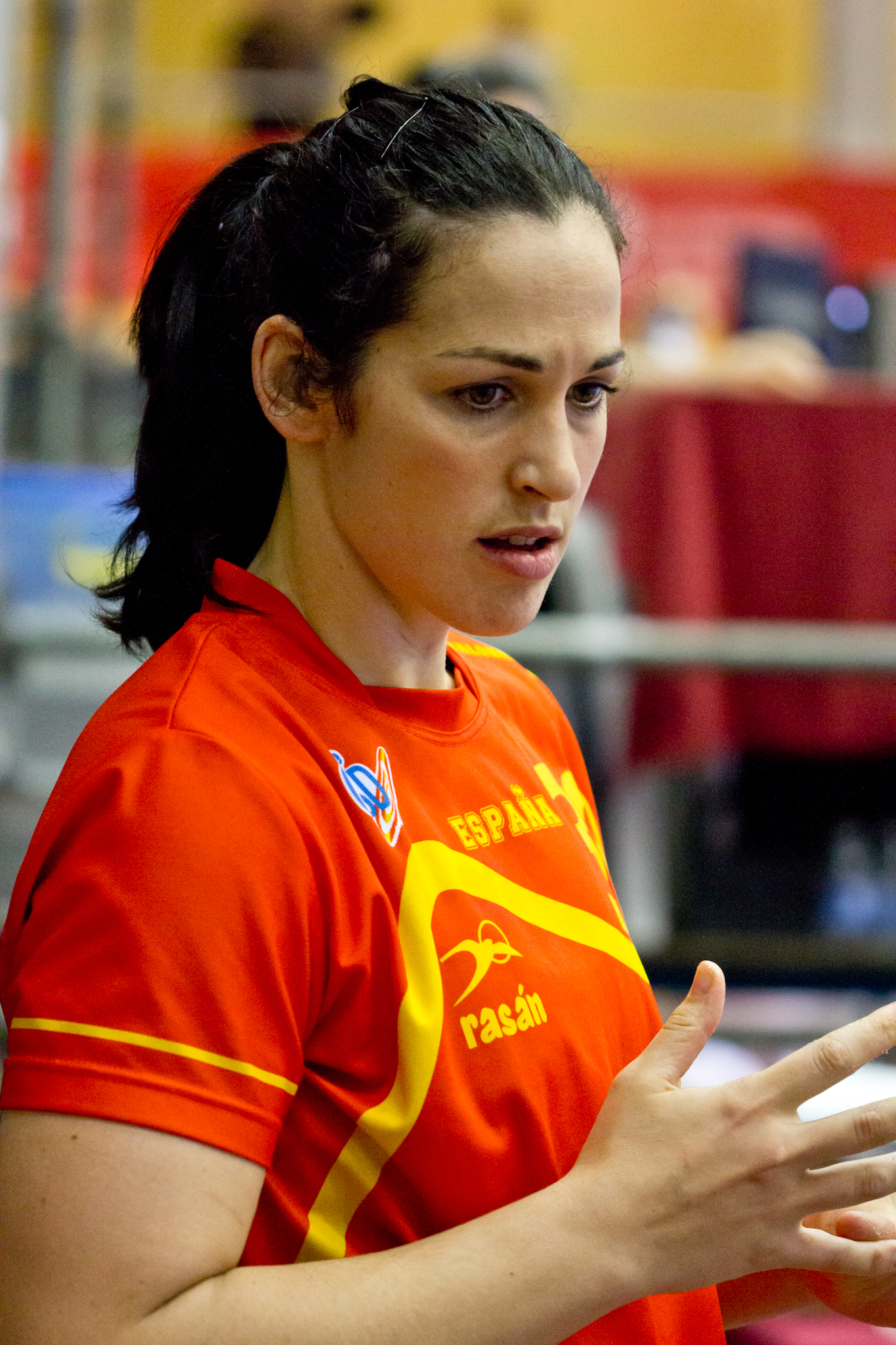

Personal information
- Full name: Patricia Elorza Eguiara
- Nationality: Spanish
- Born: 8 April 1984 (age 42) Vitoria-Gasteiz, Spain
- Height: 1.80 m (5 ft 11 in)

Sport
- Sport: Handball
- Position: Left back

Senior clubs
- Years: Team
- 2002–2003: BM Bera Bera
- 2003–2004: BM Zuazo
- 2004–2012: BM Castro Urdiales
- 2012–2015: BM Bera Bera
- 2015–2016: ES Besançon
- 2016–2017: BM Bera Bera
- 2017–2018: BM Zuazo
National team
| Years | Team | Apps | (Gls) |
| 2010-2016 | Spain | 126 | (75) |
Medal record
Olympic Games
| Bronze medal – third place | 2012 London | Team |
World Championship
| Bronze medal – third place | 2011 Brazil |
European Championship
| Silver medal – second place | 2014 Croatia/Hungary |

Patricia Elorza Eguiara (born 8 April 1984) is a Spanish former handball player for the Spanish national team.

She participated at the 2011 World Women's Handball Championship in Brazil, where Spain won a bronze medal, the first world championship medal for the Spanish women's team. She was also part of the national team at the 2012 Summer Olympics, where they also won a bronze medal.
