= Azurmendi =

Azurmendi is a Basque surname. Notable people with the surname include:

- Clara Azurmendi (born 1998), Spanish badminton player
- Eneko Azurmendi (born 1977), Basque chef
- Joxe Azurmendi (1941–2025), Basque writer, philosopher, essayist, and poet
- Mikel Azurmendi (1942–2021), Spanish anthropologist
- Nora Azurmendi (born 1995), Spanish handballer
