= Lígia Costa =

Brazilian handball player (born 1996)

Personal information
- Full name: Lígia Costa Maia da Silva
- Born: 14 March 1996 (age 30) Rio de Janeiro, Brazil
- Height: 1.90 m (6 ft 3 in)

Sport
- Sport: Handball
- Position: Pivot
- Current club: US Altkirch
- Number: 13

Senior clubs
- Years: Team
- 2009–2015: Apahand/UCS
- 2015–2017: Pogoń Baltica Szczecin
- 2017–2018: BM Bera Bera
- 2018–2019: US Altkirch
National team
| Years | Team | Apps | (Gls) |
| 2013– | Brazil | 14 | (15) |

Lígia Costa Maia da Silva (born 14 March 1996) is a Brazilian handballer for US Altkirch, France and the Brazilian national team.

== Achievements ==
- Polish Superleague:
  - Silver Medalist: 2016
- Polish Cup:
  - Silver Medalist: 2016
