= 1982–83 Women's IHF Cup =

European handball tournament

The 1982–83 Women's IHF Cup was the second edition of the competition, taking place between October 1982 and 1 May 1983. A round of 16 was introduced as the tournament was expanded from 11 to 17 teams, with Austria, Czechoslovakia, Denmark, Portugal, Spain and Switzerland making their debut. Avtomobilist Baku became the first Soviet team to win the competition by beating Empor Rostock in the final, while TJ Topolniky and TC Veszprém also reached the semifinals and defending champion RK Trešnjevka was defeated by compatriot Sekulić Sombor in the Round of 16.

== Preliminary round ==
Team #1	Agg.	Team #2	1st match	2nd match
Beira-Mar (Portugal)	23–46	(Spain) Ayete	14–26	9–20

== Round of 16 ==
Team #1	Agg.	Team #2	1st match	2nd match
TK Topolniky (Czech Republic)	51–25	(Austria) Union Landhaus	28–14	23–11
Svendborg TGI (Denmark)	41–30	(Sweden) Göteborgs Kvinnliga	17–15	24–15
Trešnjevka (Socialist Federal Republic of Yugoslavia)	45–46	(Socialist Federal Republic of Yugoslavia) Sekulić Sombor	19–19	26–27
Avtomobilist Baku (Soviet Union)	62–37	(Spain) ACD Ayete	25–15	37–22
Bakony Vegyész (Hungary)	57–19	(Switzerland) CAC Zürich	31–9	26–10
Avanti Lebbeke (Belgium)	23–35	(Netherlands) NILOC Amsterdam	5–19	18–16
Engelskirchen (Germany)	27–34	(Norway) IL Vestar	15–15	12–19
Empor Rostock (East Germany)	70–19	(France) PLM Conflans	40–8	30–11

== Quarter-finals ==
Team #1	Agg.	Team #2	1st match	2nd match
Topolniky (Czech Republic)	41–31	(Denmark) Svendborg	26–18	15–13
Sekulić Sombor (Socialist Federal Republic of Yugoslavia)	32–48	(Soviet Union) Avtomobilist Baku	22–20	10–28
Bakony Vegyész (Hungary)	43–37	(Netherlands) NILOC Amsterdam	20–16	23–21
Vestar (Norway)	30–36	(East Germany) Empor Rostock	17–18	13–18

== Semifinals ==
Team #1	Agg.	Team #2	1st match	2nd match
Topolniky (Czech Republic)	40–43	(Soviet Union) Avtomobilist Baku	20–21	20–22
Bakony Vegyész (Hungary)	34–42	(East Germany) Empor Rostock	19–19	15–23

== Final ==
Team #1	Agg.	Team #2	1st match	2nd match
Avtomobilist Baku (Soviet Union)	38–29	(East Germany) Empor Rostock	20–14	18–15
