= CD Aiete =

Spanish handball club

Club Deportivo Aiete, formerly known as Asociación Cultural y Deportiva Ayete, is a Spanish handball club from the Aiete district in San Sebastián founded in 1959. Best known for its defunct women's team, it remains active in formative handball.

ACD Ayete women's team, established in 1973, reached the national cup's final in its debut season in the top category eight years later. In 1982 Ayete was the national championship's runner-up to become the first team to represent Spain in the Women's IHF Cup the following season. It was awarded the Spanish Handball Federation's fair play award in 1982 and 1983.
