= Nuria Benzal =

Spanish handball player (born 1985)

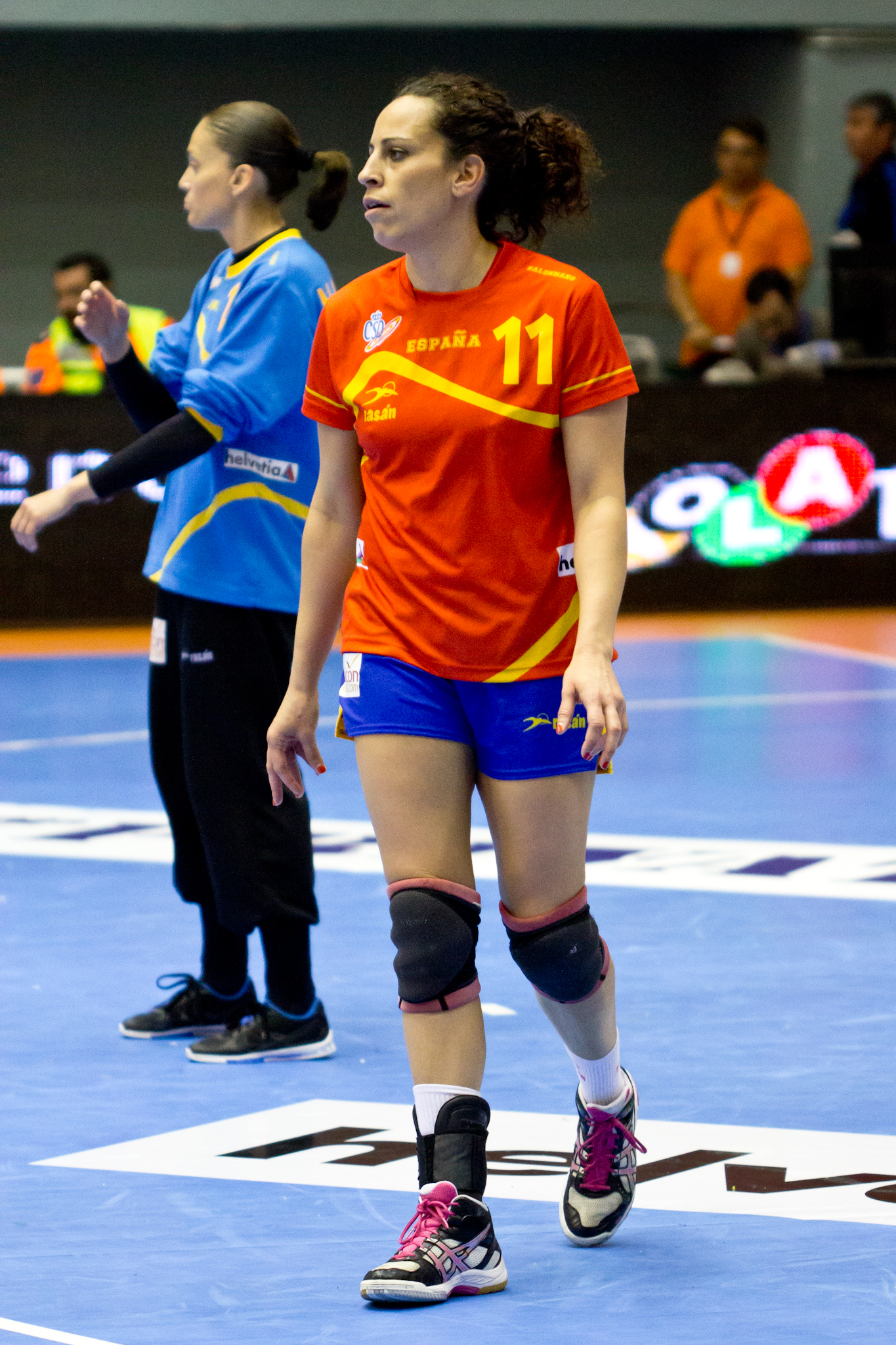

Personal information
- Full name: Nuria Benzal Andaloussi
- Nationality: Spanish
- Born: 3 April 1985 (age 41) Estepona, Spain
- Height: 1.69 m (5 ft 7 in)

Sport
- Sport: Handball
- Position: Central back

Senior clubs
- Years: Team
- 2002–2004: El Osito L'Eliana
- 2004–2009: BM Sagunto
- 2009–2010: CB Mar Alicante
- 2010–2012: Cleba León
- 2012–2013: ŽRK Zaječar
- 2013–2014: Fehérvár KC
- 2014–2016: CB Atlético Guardés
- 2016–2017: Rincón Fertilidad Málaga
- 2017–2018: Üsküdar Bld. SK
National team
Years	Team	Apps	(Gls)
2006–2014	Spain	87	(122)
Medal record
European Championship
Silver medal – second place	2008 Macedonia	Team

Nuria Benzal Andaloussi (born 3 April 1985) is a Spanish handball player who most recently played for Üsküdar Bld. SK and formerly was a member of the Spanish women's national team.

Benzal was part of the Spanish team at the 2008 European Women's Handball Championship, where the Spanish team reached the final, after defeating Germany in the semifinal.

A year later she was part of the Spanish team that finished 4th at the 2009 World Women's Handball Championship.
