= Ana Temprano =

Spanish handball player (born 1984)

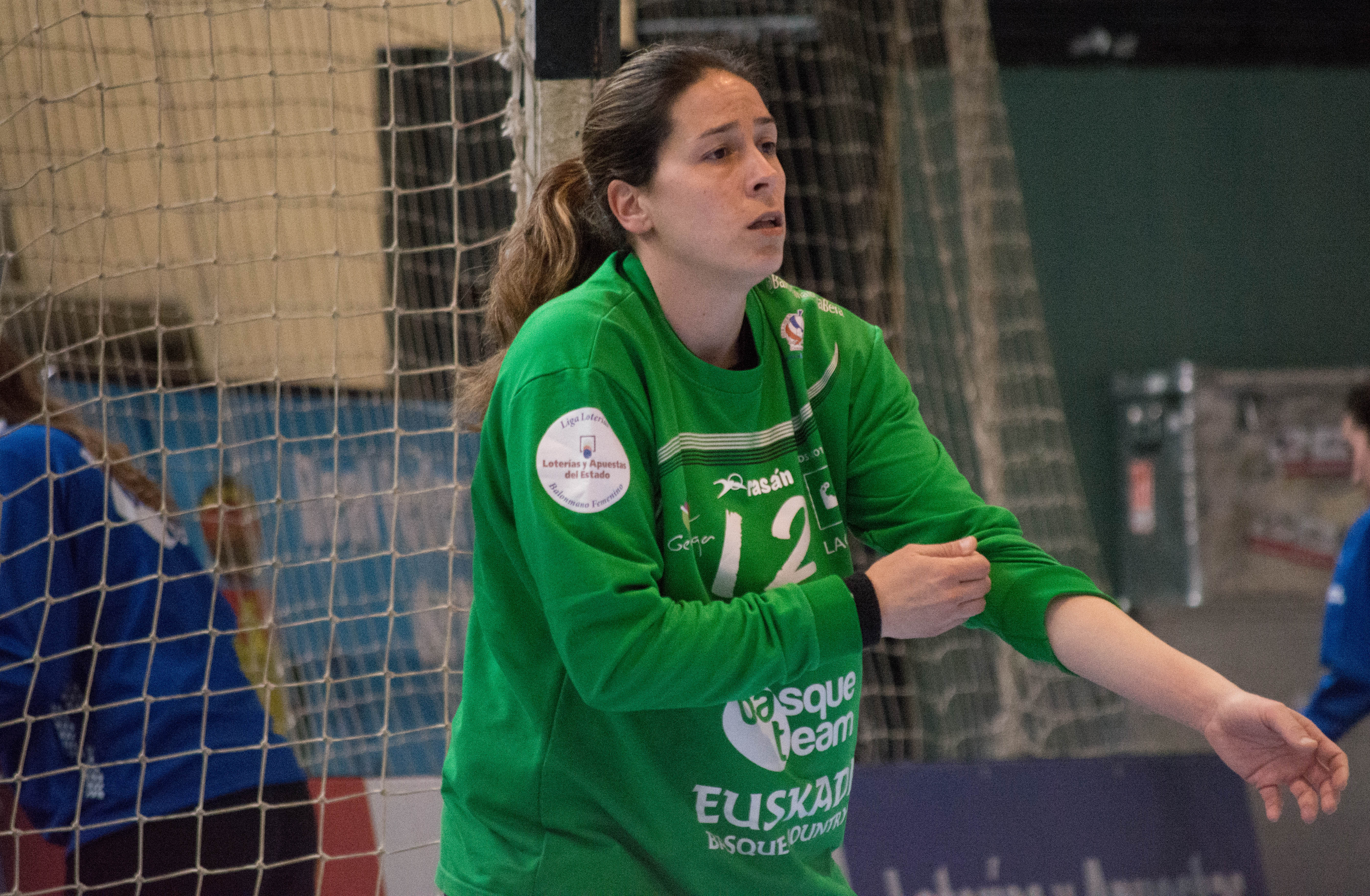

Personal information
- Full name: Ana Temprano Fernández
- Nationality: Spanish
- Born: 28 January 1984 (age 42) Oviedo, Spain
- Height: 1.72 m (5 ft 8 in)

Sport
- Sport: Handball
- Position: Goalkeeper

Senior clubs
- Years: Team
- 2005–2009: BM Gijón
- 2009–2011: BM Castro Urdiales
- 2011–2012: BM Murcia
- 2012–2013: BM Zuazo
- 2013–2017: BM Bera Bera
- 2017–2018: BM Zuazo
National team
Years	Team	Apps	(Gls)
2014–2016	Spain	21	(1)
Medal record
European Championship
Silver medal – second place	2014 Croatia/Hungary	Team

Ana Temprano (born 28 January 1984) is a former Spanish handball player for the Spanish national team.
