= Estela Doiro =

Spanish handball player (born 1990)

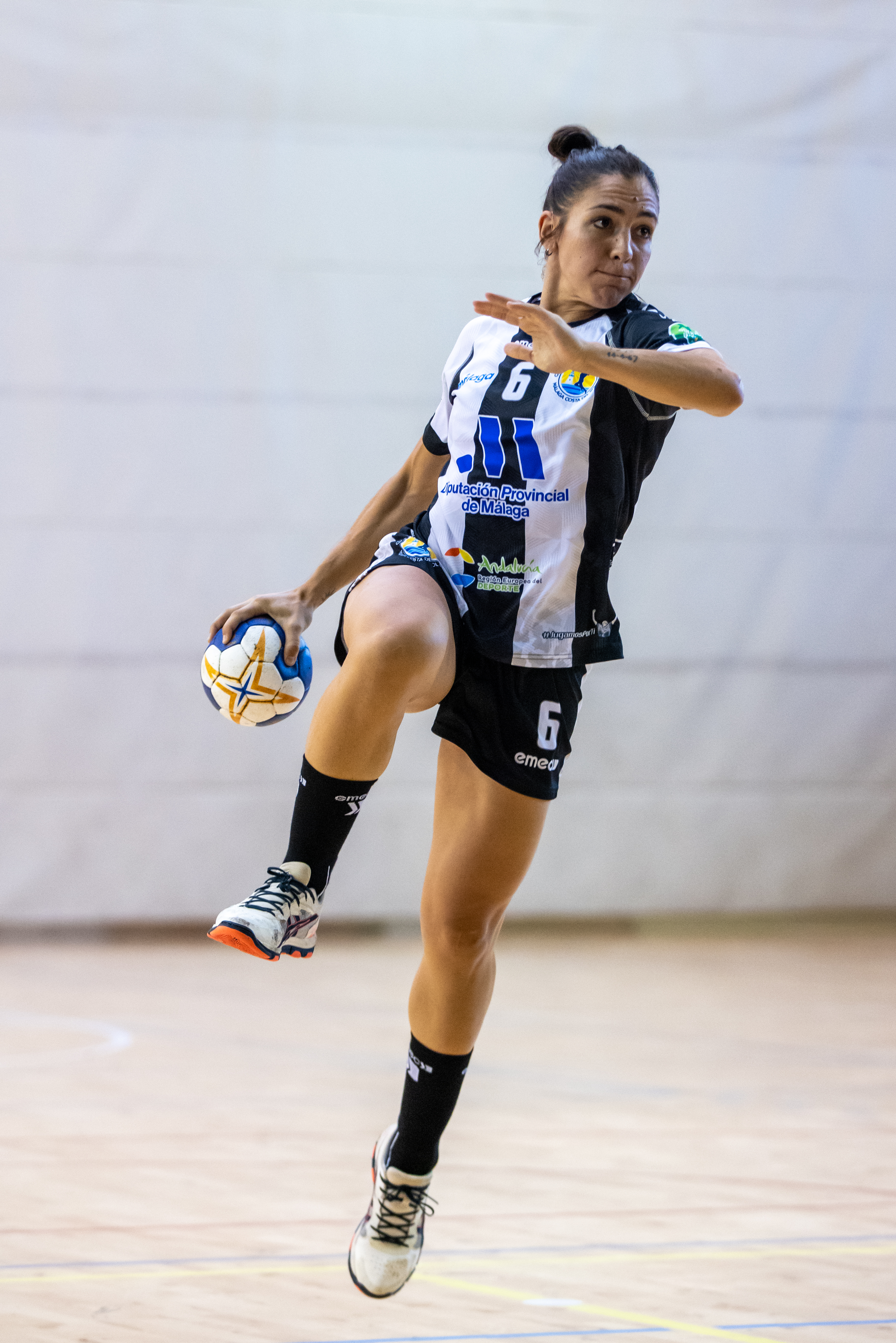

Personal information
- Full name: Estela Doiro Rodríguez
- Nationality: Spanish
- Born: 28 December 1990 (age 35) La Guardia, Province of Pontevedra, Spain
- Height: 1.65 m (5 ft 5 in)

Sport
- Sport: Handball
- Position: Right Back
- Current club: Málaga Costa del Sol
- Number: 6

Senior clubs
- Years: Team
- 2019–: Málaga Costa del Sol
- 2013–2019: CB Atlético Guardés
- 2011–2013: BM Porriño
National team
Years	Team	Apps	(Gls)
2011–	Spain	5	(4)

Estela Doiro Rodríguez (born 28 December 1990) is a Spanish handball player who serves as the right wing for Málaga Costa del Sol in the Liga Guerreras Iberdrola. She also represents Spain internationally as part of the women's national handball team.

== Professional career ==
She began her handball journey in the youth categories of Club Balonmano Atlético Guardés. At the age of 16, she moved to Balonmano Porriño to make her debut in the top national competition two years later, following Porriño's promotion to División de Honor. In the 2012 season, she returned to her hometown club.

The prominent captain of Mecalia Atlético Guardés, champion of the 2017-2018 Liga, joined Rincón Fertilidad Málaga in the 2019–2020 season after disagreements with the management of the Guardés team. With the Malaga-based team, she played a key role in winning the Copa de la Reina in 2020, where she was chosen as the MVP of the final, and again in 2022 against her former team.

Additionally, she secured the EHF European Cup title with the malaguenian "panthers" in the 2020–2021 season, contributing with 27 goals in that competition. She also claimed the title of Spanish Super Cup after scoring the winning goal in the match against Bera Bera. In the 2022-2023 season, she completed a remarkable feat by winning the Liga Guerreras Iberdrola with the Costa del Sol team.

She forms, along with Silvia Arderius and Espe López, the shortest frontline in the Liga Guerreras Iberdrola (1.65, 1.69, and 1.57 meters respectively).

=== Spain women's national team ===
A five-time international player and scorer of four goals with the Spanish national team, she made her debut in 2011 at the International 4 Nations Tournament. She returned to the national squad for preparation matches against Romania in Huesca in 2017 and participated in the Objective 2021 training sessions in 2020.

With the junior team, she played a total of 39 matches, and 13 with the Spanish university national team, competing in 2 university world championships: Málaga 2016, where they were crowned world champions, and Guimaraes 2014. The Guardés frontline suffered an injury in the first match of the World Championship but stayed with the team throughout the tournament, celebrating the victory from the sidelines.

== Awards, Individual Awards and recognitions ==
- 2 x Liga Guerreras Iberdrola (2016/17, 2022/23)
- 1 x Copa de la Reina (2019/20)
- 1 x Supercopa de España (2020/21)
- 1 x European Cup (2020/21)
- Gold Medal in 2016 Women's Universitary World Handball Championship (2016)
- MVP Queen's Cup (2020).

== Life ==
Doiro is a supporter of her hometown and its sports arena. She has cited Tina Turner’s "Simply the Best" among her musical preferences and has expressed admiration for tennis player Rafa Nadal and handball players Marta Mangue and Begoña Fernández. She is also a supporter of Real Madrid.

She holds degrees in Physical Activity and Sport Sciences as well as in Primary Education from the University of Vigo.

== Disability ==
The galician player discovered during the pandemic that she had a hearing problem. To address otosclerosis, a degenerative (and hereditary) condition, she was advised to undergo surgery and get a cochlear implant. However, as this was incompatible with her handball career, she opted for a hearing aid that allows her to lead a normal life while continuing her professional player role.
