= Patricia Pinedo =

Spanish handball player (born 1981)

Personal information
- Full name: Patricia Pinedo Saenz
- Nationality: Spanish
- Born: 13 May 1981 (age 45) Amurrio, Spain
- Height: 1.72 m (5 ft 8 in)

Sport
- Sport: Handball
- Position: Left Back
- Current club: Retired

Senior clubs
- Years: Team
- 2000–2009: BM Bera Bera
- 2009–2013: SD Itxako
National team
Years	Team	Apps	(Gls)
–	Spain	68	(77)
Medal record
Women's handball
Representing Spain
World Championship
Bronze medal – third place	2011 Brazil	Team
- Updated on 3 November 2011

Patricia Pinedo (born 13 May 1981 in Amurrio) is a Spanish former handballer who played for SD Itxako and BM Bera Bera as well as the Spanish national team, with them she participated at the 2011 World Women's Handball Championship in Brazil, where Spain won Bronze medals.

She retired in 2013 after her team had been disbanded.

Her twin sister Elisabeth Pinedo also plays for the Spanish national handball team.
