= CE Handbol Marítim =

Spanish handball club

- Full name: Club Esportiu Handbol Marítim
- Short name: Valencia Aicequip
- Founded: 1997
- Dissolved: June 2013
- Arena: El Cabanyal, Valencia
- Capacity: 1,200
- President: Manolo Gómez (ESP)
- Head coach: Natalya Morskova (ESP)
- 2012–13: División de Honor, 10th
- Club colours
| Home | Away |

Club Esportiu Handbol Marítim, also known as Valencia Aicequip, was a Spanish women's handball club from Valencia. In 2012 became the successor of national powerhouse BM Sagunto.

The club was disbanded in June 2013 due to large debts inherited from the BM Sagunto period. Its sports rights were transferred to new created club Club Handbol Canyamelar.

== Season to season ==
| Season | Tier | Division | Pos. | Notes |
|---|---|---|---|---|
| 1997–98 | 3 | 2ª Nacional | 1st | Promoted |
| 1998–99 | 2 | 1ª Nacional | 2nd (Group B) | Promoted |
| 1999–00 | 1 | División de Honor | 7th (Group B) | Relegated |
| 2000–01 | 2 | 1ª Nacional | 1st (Group B) | Promoted |
| 2001–02 | 1 | División de Honor | 8th (Group B) | Relegated |
| 2002–03 | 2 | 1ª Nacional | 1st (Group B) | Promoted |
| 2003–04 | 1 | División de Honor | 12th | |
| 2004–05 | 1 | División de Honor | 9th | |
| 2005–06 | 1 | División de Honor | 13th | Relegated |

| Season | Tier | Division | Pos. | Notes |
|---|---|---|---|---|
| 2006–07 | 2 | 1ª Nacional | 1st (Group B) | |
| 2007–08 | 2 | 1ª Nacional | 2nd (Group B) | |
| 2008–09 | 2 | 1ª Nacional | 2nd (Group B) | |
| 2009–10 | 2 | 1ª Nacional | 4th (Group B) | |
| 2010–11 | 3 | 1ª Nacional | 3rd | Promoted |
| 2011–12 | 2 | División de Plata | 2nd (Group B) | Promoted |
| 2012–13 | 1 | División de Honor | 10th | Disbanded |

- 6 seasons in División de Honor
