= Darly de Paula =

Spanish handball player (born 1982)

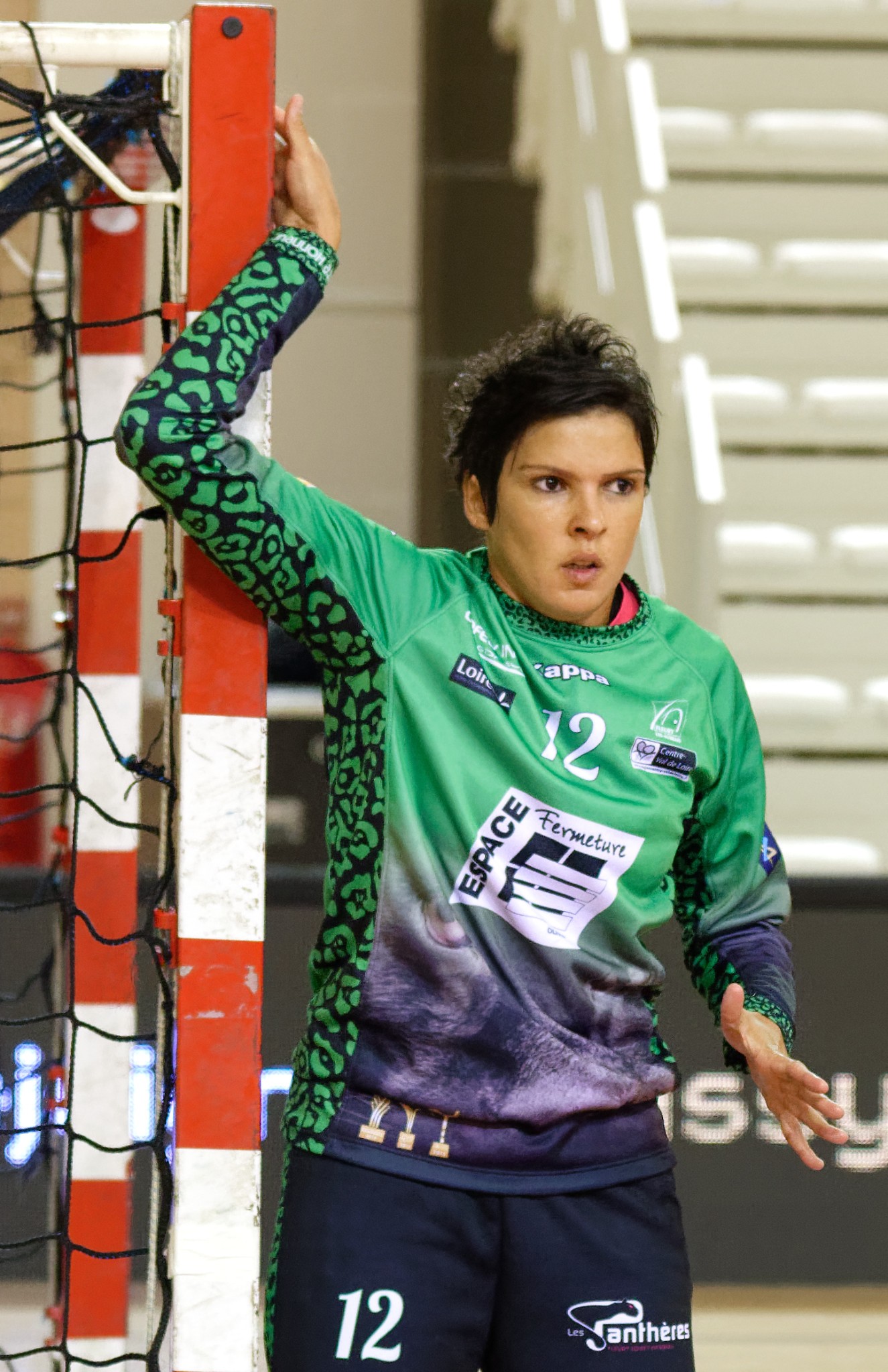

Personal information
- Full name: Darly Zoqbi de Paula
- Nationality: Brazilian; Spanish
- Born: 25 August 1982 (age 44) Ponte Nova, Brazil
- Height: 1.78 m (5 ft 10 in)

Sport
- Sport: Handball
- Position: Goalkeeper
- Current club: SCM Craiova
- Number: 55

Senior clubs
- Years: Team
- 2002–2003: BM Murcia
- 2003–2006: Akaba Bera Bera
- 2006–2010: Le Havre AC
- 2010–2011: BM Sagunto
- 2011–2013: BM Bera Bera
- 2013–2016: Fleury Loiret HB
- 2016–2019: ŽRK Budućnost Podgorica
- 2019–2023: Gloria Bistrița
- 03–06/2023: Brest Bretagne Handball
- 2023–: SCM Craiova
National team
Years	Team		
–	Brazil		
2015–	Spain	68	(0)
Medal record
World Championship
Silver medal – second place	2019 Japan

Darly Zoqbi de Paula (born 25 August 1982) is a handballer who plays as a goalkeeper for SCM Craiova. Born in Brazil, she represents Spain at international level.

She originally played for the Brazil women's national handball team, having participated at the 2004 Summer Olympics in Athens and at the 2008 Summer Olympics in China. After becoming a naturalized citizen of Spain, she competed for that nation at the 2016 Summer Olympics in Brazil.

== International honours ==
- EHF Champions League:
  - Fourth place: 2017
- EHF Cup Winners' Cup:
  - Finalist: 2015
- EHF Cup:
  - Semifinalist: 2010

== Individual awards ==
- Junior World Championship Best Goalkeeper: 2001
- French Championship Best Goalkeeper: 2015
