= Haridian Rodríguez =

Spanish female handball player (b. 1986)

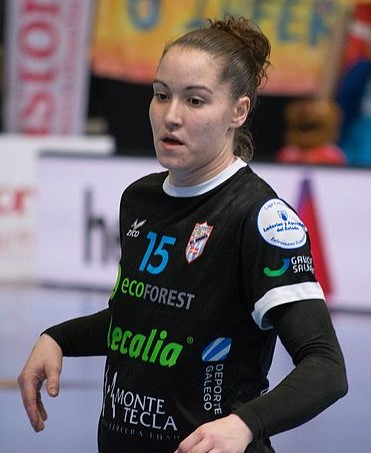

Personal information
- Full name: Haridian Rodríguez Hernández
- Nationality: Spanish
- Born: 31 July 1986 (age 40) Las Palmas, Spain
- Height: 1.72 m (5 ft 7 1/2 in)

Sport
- Sport: Handball
- Position: Line player
- Current club: Club Balonmano Porriño
- Number: 22

Senior clubs
- Years: Team
- 2009–2015: Rocasa Gran Canaria
- 2015–2017: BM Atlético Guardés
- 2017–: Rocasa Gran Canaria
National team
Years	Team	Apps	(Gls)
2013-	Spain	11	(9)

Haridian Rodríguez Hernández (born 31 July 1986) is a Spanish female handball player for Club Balonmano Porriño and the Spanish national team.

== Achievements ==
- División de Honor: 2016/17
- Copa de la Reina: 2015
- Supercopa de España: 2017
