= Ana Martínez (handballer) =

Spanish handball player (born 1991)

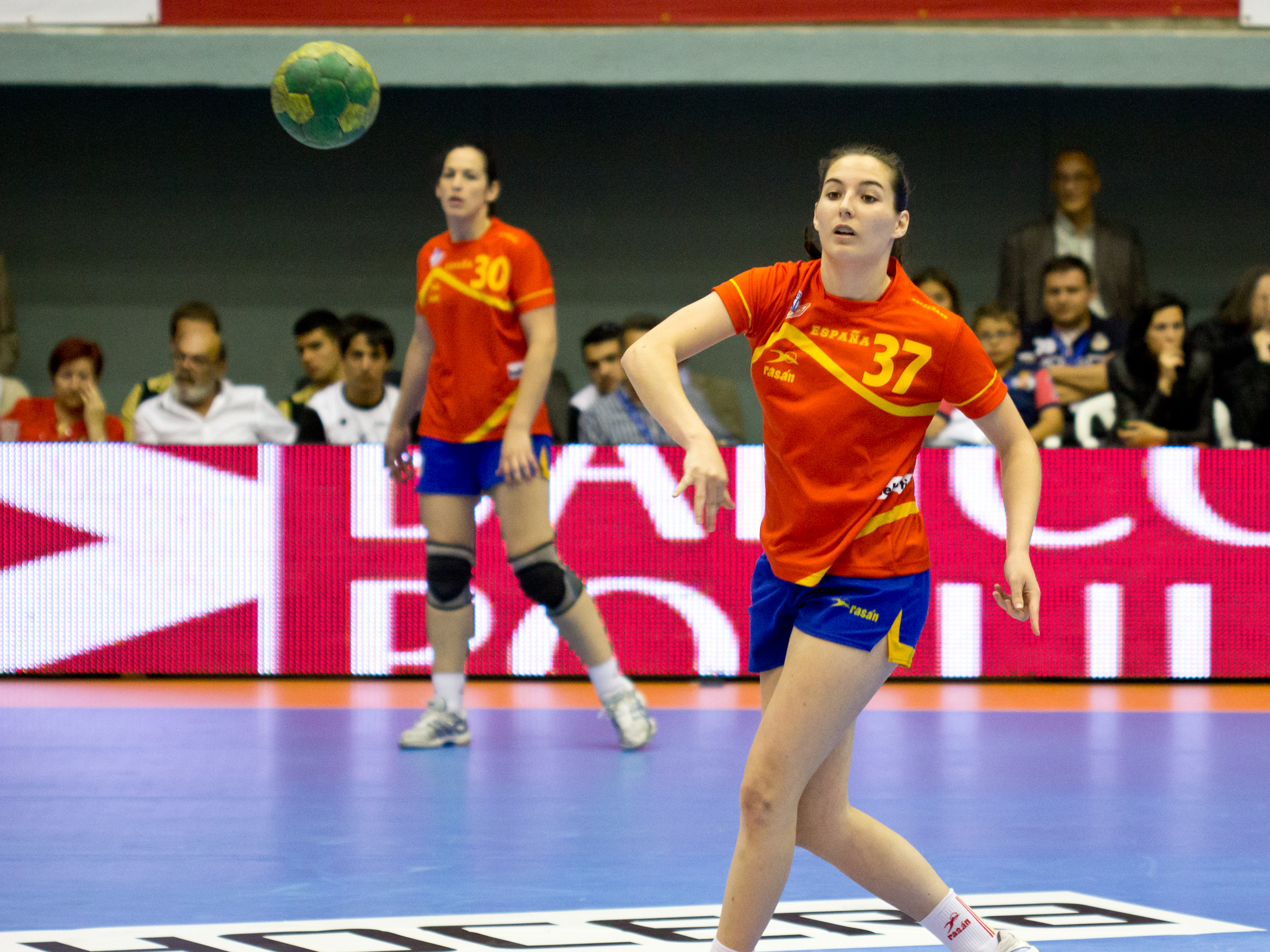

Personal information
- Full name: Ana Isabel Martínez Martínez
- Nationality: Spanish
- Born: 7 December 1991 (age 34) Elche, Spain
- Height: 1.72 m (5 ft 8 in)

Sport
- Sport: Handball
- Position: Left back
- Current club: Club Balonmano Elche
- Number: 44

Senior clubs
- Years: Team
- 2009–2013: Club Balonmano Elche
- 2013–2017: Super Amara Bera Bera
- 2017–2018: OGC Nice
- 2018–: Club Balonmano Elche
National team
Years	Team	Apps	(Gls)
2013–	Spain	35	(21)

Ana Isabel Martínez Martínez (born 7 December 1991) is a Spanish handball player for Club Balonmano Elche and on Spanish national team.

She participated at the 2018 European Women's Handball Championship.
