= Tania Yáñez =

Spanish handball player (born 1986)

Personal information
- Full name: Tania Yáñez Martínez
- Nationality: Spanish
- Born: 8 March 1986 (age 40) Barakaldo
- Height: 1.72 m (5 ft 8 in)

Sport
- Sport: Handball
- Position: Right Back

Senior clubs
- Years: Team
- –2011: BM Zuazo
- 2011–2012: BM Castro Urdiales
- 2012–2015: BM Zuazo
- 2015–2016: BM Bera Bera

Tania Yáñez Martínez (born 8 March 1986) is a former Spanish female handballer. The 2013–2014 season was the top scorer in the Spanish League.

== Achievements ==
- División de Honor Femenina:
  - Winner: 2015/2016
- Spanish Queen's Cup:
  - Winner: 2016
