= BM Alcobendas =

Spanish handball club

Secin Group Alcobendas
- Full name: Club Balonmano Alcobendas
- Founded: 1994
- Arena: Pabellón de los Sueños, Alcobendas, Community of Madrid, Spain
- Capacity: 1,000
- President: (Spain) Víctor de Miguel Gabriel
- Head coach: (Spain) M: Ángel Castaño (Spain) W: Cristina Cabeza
- League: M: Liga ASOBAL; W: División de Honor
- 2024–25: M: División de Plata, 1st W: División de Plata, 1st
Home	Away

Balonmano Alcobendas is a handball club based in Alcobendas, Madrid. BM Alcobendas plays in División de Honor Plata.

Alcobendas' women's team came 4th in the 2011–12 División de Honor, qualifying for EHF competitions for the first time.

== Men's team ==
=== Season by season ===
Season	Tier	Division	Pos.	Notes
1994–95	3	Primera Nacional	5th (Group A)	
1995–96	3	Primera Nacional	7th (Group C)	
1996–97	3	Primera Nacional	4th (Group C)	
1997–98	3	Primera Nacional	3rd (Group B)	
1998–99	3	Primera Nacional	1st (Group A)	Promoted
1999–00	2	Honor B	6th	
2000–01	2	Honor B	7th	
2001–02	2	Honor B	1st	Promoted
2002–03	1	ASOBAL	15th	Relegated
2003–04	2	Honor B	1st	Promoted
2004–05	1	ASOBAL	12th	
2005–06	1	ASOBAL	15th	Relegated
2006–07	2	Honor B	4th	

Season	Tier	Division	Pos.	Notes
2007–08	2	Honor B	1st	Promoted
2008–09	1	ASOBAL	14th	
2009–10	1	ASOBAL	9th	
2010–11	1	ASOBAL	16th	Relegated
2011–12	2	Plata	9th	
2012–13	2	Plata	5th / SF	
2013–14	2	Plata	3rd / F	
2014–15	2	Plata	7th	
2015–16	2	Plata	11th	
2016–17	2	Plata	6th / SF	
2017–18	2	Plata	1st	Promoted
2018–19	1	ASOBAL		

- 7 seasons in Liga ASOBAL
- 13 seasons in División de Plata

=== Team ===
Squad for the 2018–19 season

Goalkeepers

- 12 (Spain) Adrián Torres Herrera
- 30 (Belarus) Dzmitry Patotsky
- 97 (Spain) Sergio Antón Ramírez

Wingers
RW

- 17 (Spain) Antonio Ortega Barranco
- 23 (Spain) Mario Crespo Cedena
- 33 (Spain) Martí Villoria

LW

- 7 (Spain) Mikel Martín Limonge
- 25 (Spain) Ignacio Gimeno

Line players

- 6 (Montenegro) Admir Pelidija
- 11 (Spain) José Alberto López Boyarizo
- 94 (Spain) Javier Rodríguez Moreno

Back players
LB

- 4 (Spain) Santiago López García
- 13 (Spain) Miguel Nuñez García
- 39 (Spain) Asier Nieto

CB

- 10 (Spain) Alfonso de la Rubia
- 14 (Spain) Gonzalo Velasco
- 77 (Iceland) Stefan Thorsson
- 89 (Spain) Mario Nevado

RB

- 9 (Spain) Manuel Catalina Falcón
- 22 (Spain) José María Gutiérrez de Corral

=== Transfers ===
Transfers for the 2026–27 season

Joining

Leaving

- (Spain) Alejandro Colón (CB) to (Spain) BM Atlético Valladolid

=== Transfer History ===
Transfers for the 2025–26 season

Joining

Leaving

- (Spain) Iker Aguilera (LB) to (Spain) Helvetia Anaitasuna
- (Spain) Ramón Fuentes (GK) to (Spain) BM Proin Triana

== Women's team ==
=== Season by season ===
Season	Tier	Division	Pos.	Notes
2005–06	2	1ª Nacional	5th (Group C)	
2006–07	2	1ª Nacional	2nd (Group C)	
2007–08	2	1ª Nacional	1st (Group C)	Promoted
2008–09	1	Honor	10th	
2009–10	1	Honor	9th	
2010–11	1	Honor	10th	
2011–12	1	Honor	4th	
2012–13	1	Honor	4th	
2013–14	1	Honor	3rd	
2014–15	1	Honor	4th	
2015–16	1	Honor	4th	

Season	Tier	Division	Pos.	Notes
2016–17	1	Honor	13th	Relegated
2017–18	2	División de Plata	1st / F	Promoted
2018–19	1	Honor	11th	

- 10 seasons in División de Honor

=== European record ===
Season	Competition	Round	Club	Home	Away	Aggregate
2016-17	Challenge Cup	R2	(North Macedonia) ŽRK Kumanovo	31–15	23–17	77–57
2016-17	Challenge Cup	R3	(Portugal) Colégio de Gaia	25–21	19–29	44–50

=== Team ===
Squad for the 2020–21 season

Goalkeepers

- (Paraguay) Araceli Yaryes

Wingers
RW

LW

Line players

- (Spain) Cristina Polonio

Back players
LB

- 5 (Spain) Julia Díaz

CB

- 8 (Spain) Alba Fernández Tobías

RB

- 14 (Spain) Teresa Francés

== Notable players ==
Men

- (Spain) Mikel Aguirrezabalaga
- (Serbia) Dalibor Čutura
- (Spain) Roberto García
- (Croatia) Nikola Kedžo
- (Spain) Jorge Maqueda
- (Montenegro) Rade Mijatović
- (Montenegro) Mirko Milašević
- (Japan) Daisuke Miyazaki
- (France) Olivier Nyokas
- (Spain) Jesús Olalla
- (Serbia) Miloš Pešić
- (Serbia) (Bosnia and Herzegovina) Danijel Šarić
- (Brazil) Bruno Souza
- (Spain) Samuel Trives
- (Netherlands) Matthijs Vink

Women

- (France) Marion Anti
- (Spain) Leire Aramendia
- (Spain) Silvia Arderíus
- (Spain) Nora Azurmendi
- (Tunisia) Noura Ben Slama
- (Spain) Emma Boada
- (Netherlands) Yvette Broch
- (Cuba) Yunisleidy Camejo
- (Spain) Mercedes Castellanos
- (Spain) Mihaela Ciobanu
- (Argentina) Macarena Gandulfo
- (Spain) Paula García
- (Spain) Mireya González
- (Spain) Marta López
- (Spain) Elisabeth Pinedo
- (Netherlands) Charris Rozemalen
- (Spain) Judith Sans
