= Supercopa de España de Balonmano Femenino =

Spanish handball tournament

Supercopa de Balonmano Femenino
- Sport: Handball
- Founded: 2000
- No. of teams: 2
- Country: Spain
- Most recent champion: Rocasa Gran Canaria (2026)
- Most titles: Bera Bera (8)
- Broadcaster: Teledeporte
- Website: www.rfebm.net

The Supercopa de España de Balonmano Femenino is an annual Spanish women's handball tournament played by the División de Honor Femenino champions and Copa de la Reina winners. It's managed by Real Federación Española de Balonmano.

The tournament was established in 2000. It's played around early September.

== Winners by year ==
Season	Venue	Champion	Runners-up	Score
1999–00	Arroyomolinos	El Osito L'Eliana	Ferrobús KU Mislata	28–27
2000–01	Not played			
2001–02	Picanya	El Osito L'Eliana	Ferrobús Mislata	29–25
2002–03	Aspe	El Osito L'Eliana	Alsa Elda Prestigio	36–34
2003–04	Valencia	Ferrobús Mislata	Alsa Elda Prestigio	32–31
2004–05	Alicante	Orsan Elda Prestigio	Cementos La Unión Ribarroja	21–20
2005–06	Elda	Astroc Sagunto	Orsan Elda Prestigio	32–30
2006–07	Torrent	Cementos La Unión Ribarroja	Akaba Bera Bera	25–22
2007–08	San Sebastián	Akaba Bera Bera	Cementos La Unión Ribarroja	21–18
2008–09	Elda	Orsan Elda Prestigio	Parc Sagunt	25–22
2009–10	San Sebastián	Itxako Reyno de Navarra	Akaba Bera Bera	24–23
2010–11	Logroño	Itxako Reyno de Navarra	Mar Alicante	28–21
2011–12	Elda	Asfi Itxako	Elda Prestigio	31–16
2012–13	San Sebastián	Bera Bera	Asfi Itxako	42–18
2013–14	San Sebastián	Bera Bera	Rocasa G.C. ACE	25–24
2014–15	Guadalajara	Bera Bera	Rocasa G.C. ACE	23–20
2015–16	San Sebastián	Bera Bera	Rocasa G.C. ACE	18–17
2016–17	Pamplona	Super Amara Bera Bera	Prosetecnica Zuazo	32–21
2017–18	Vigo	Rocasa G.C. ACE	Mecalia Atl. Guardés	28–26
2018–19	Gijón	Super Amara Bera Bera	Liberbank Gijón	25–17
2019–20	Eibar	Rocasa Gran Canaria	Super Amara Bera Bera	32–31
2020–21	Málaga	Rincón Fertilidad Málaga	Super Amara Bera Bera	28–27
2021–22	Torrelavega	Visitelche.com	Super Amara Bera Bera	23–18
2022–23	Málaga	Super Amara Bera Bera	Costa del Sol Málaga	26–25
2026–27	Vigo	Rocasa Gran Canaria	Super Amara Bera Bera	25–23

== Wins by club ==
Team	Titles	Runner-up	Champion Seasons
Bera Bera	8	5	2007–08, 2012–13, 2013–14, 2014–15, 2015–16, 2016–17, 2018–19, 2022–23
Sagunto	4	1	1999–00, 2001–02, 2002–03, 2005–06
Asfi Itxako	3	1	2009–10, 2010–11, 2011–12
Rocasa Gran Canaria	3	3	2017–18, 2019–20, 2026–27
Elda Prestigio	2	4	2004–05, 2008–09
Amadeo Tortajada	2	4	2003–04, 2006–07
Rincón Fertilidad Málaga	1	1	2020–21
Visitelche.com	1	0	2021–22
Mecalia Atl. Guardés	0	1	
Prosetecnica Zuazo	0	1	
Mar Alicante	0	1	
Liberbank Gijón	0	1	

== See also ==
- División de Honor
- Copa de la Reina
