= Elisabeth Pinedo =

Spanish handball player (born 1981)

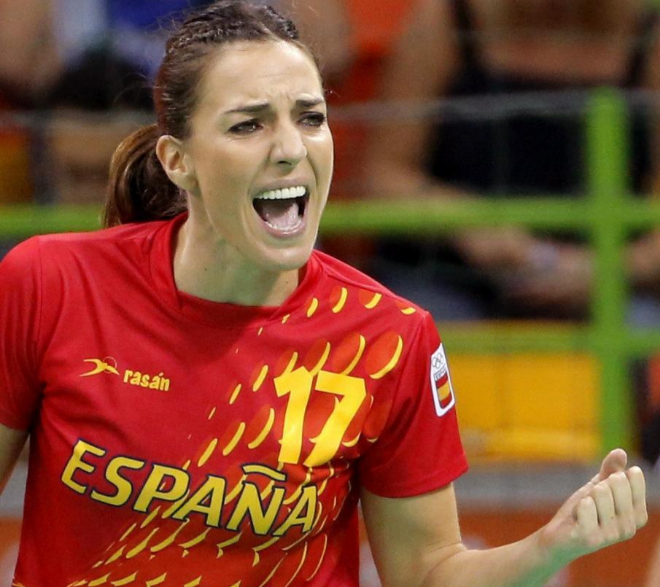
- Pinedo in 2016

Personal information
- Full name: Elisabeth Pinedo Sáenz
- Born: 13 May 1981 (age 45) Amurrio, Spain
- Height: 1.75 m (5 ft 9 in)

Sport
- Sport: Handball
- Position: Left wing

Senior clubs
- Years: Team
- 2000–2004: BM Bera Bera
- 2004–2005: Cementos la Union Ribarroja
- 2005–2007: BM Parc Sagunto
- 2007–2010: SD Itxako
- 2010–2011: HC Odense
- 2011–2016: BM Bera Bera
- 2017–2018: BM Alcobendas
National team
Years	Team	Apps	(Gls)
2005-2016	Spain	201	(441)
Medal record
Olympic Games
Bronze medal – third place	2012 London	Team
World Championship
Bronze medal – third place	2011 Brazil
European Championship
Silver medal – second place	2008 Macedonia
Silver medal – second place	2014 Croatia/Hungary

Elisabeth "Eli" Pinedo Sáenz (born 13 May 1981) is a retired Spanish handball player. She was part of the Spanish team at the 2008 European Women's Handball Championship, where the Spanish team reached the final, after defeating Germany in the semifinal. She also competed at the 2011 World Women's Handball Championship in Brazil, where the Spanish team placed third.

Her twin sister Patri was also a Spanish international handball player.
