= Silvia Arderíus =

Spanish handball player (born 1990)

Silvia Arderius
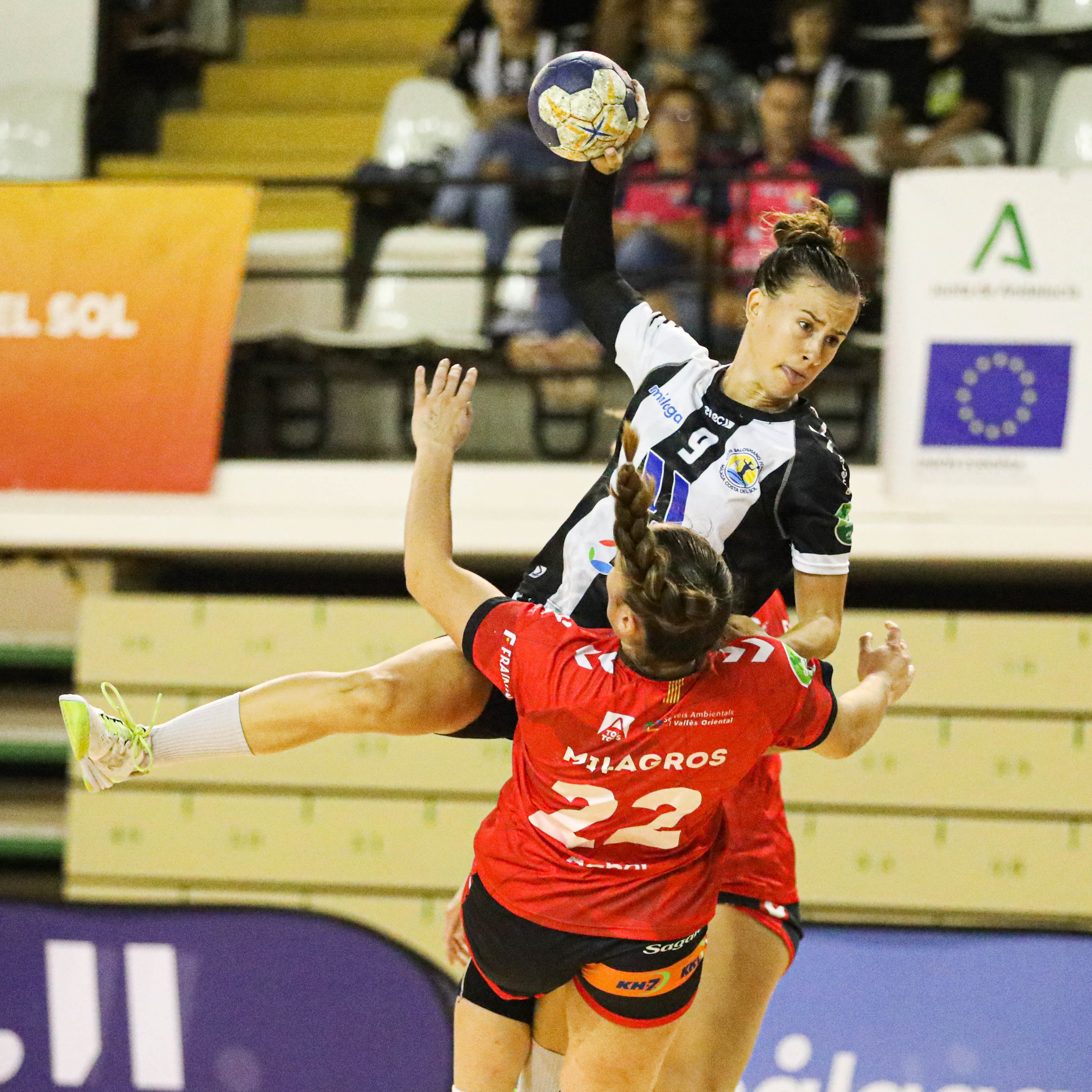
- Arderíus in 2022

Personal information
- Full name: Silvia Eugenia Arderius Martín
- Nationality: Spanish
- Born: 11 July 1990 (age 36) Madrid, Spain
- Height: 1.68 m (5 ft 6 in)

Sport
- Sport: Handball
- Position: Centre back
- Current club: Handball Erice
- Number: 9

Senior clubs
- Years: Team
- 2008–2015: Helvetia BM Alcobendas
- 2015–2017: BM Aula Cultural Valladolid
- 2017–2020: Super Amara Bera Bera
- 2020–2026: Málaga Costa del Sol
- 2026: Handball Erice
National team
Years	Team	Apps	(Gls)
2014–2004	Spain	89	(104)
Medal record
World Championship
Silver medal – second place	2019 Japan

Silvia Eugenia Arderius Martín (Note: In this Spanish name, the first or paternal surname is Arderius and the second or maternal family name is Martín.) (born 11 July 1990) is a Spanish handballer for Handball Erice and the Spanish national team.

== Achievements ==
=== Club ===
Super Amara Bera Bera

- Spanish División de Honor Femenina:
  - Winner: 2017–18, 2019–20
- Copa de la Reina de Balonmano:
  - Winner: 2017–18, 2019–20

Málaga Costa del Sol

- Spanish División de Honor Femenina:
  - Winner: 2022–23
- Copa de la Reina de Balonmano:
  - Winner: 2021–22
- EHF European Cup
  - Winner: 2020–21

=== National team ===
- Women's World University Handball Championship:
  - Winner: 2016

== Awards and recognition ==
- Trofeo Vicen Muñoz:
  - Winner: 2013–14, 2016–17, 2021–22, 2022–23
- Spanish División de Honor Femenina:
  - Best centre back: 2016–17
  - Top Scorer: 2016–17
  - 3 x MVP: 2016–17, 2017–18, 2022–23
