= BM Sagunto =

Spanish handball club

Sagunto/Mar Valencia
- Short name: Club Balonmano Sagunto
- Founded: 1963/1978
- Dissolved: July, 2012
- Arena: Rene Marigil, Sagunto
- Capacity: 800
- 2011–12: Liga ABF, 3rd
- Club colours
Home	Away

Club Balonmano Sagunto was a Spanish women's handball club from Sagunto founded in 1978 which in July, 2012 moved to Valencia and joint CE Handbol Marítim to play in División de Honor as Valencia Aicequip.

== History ==
Mar Valencia was founded in 1963 as Sección Femenina's women's handball team in Valencia (Medina Valencia) before becoming an independent club in 1978 as Íber Valencia. In 1993 it again changed its official name, taking the aforementioned one. It was also known as El Osito L'Eliana and Milar L'Eliana in subsequent years for sponsorship reasons, having moved to L'Eliana.

Íber/Mar dominated the Spanish scene through the 1980s and 1990s, winning a record 20 national leagues in a row between 1979 and 1998 and 19 national cups between 1981 and 2000. In 1997 it became the first Spanish team to win the Champions League by beating Viborg HK in the final. The team also reached the Champions' final the following year, but lost to Hypo Niederösterreich

The following years marked the ending of the club's national hegemony but it still enjoyed success in national and internacional grounds. In 2000 Mar won the Cup Winners' Cup over Kuban Krasnodar, and in 2003 it reached its third Champions League final, lost to Krim Ljubljana.

In 2004 the club moved from L'Eliana to Sagunto and changed its name to Balonmano Sagunto, a.k.a. Astroc Sagunto (2004–07) and Parc Sagunto (2007–11) after its sponsors. In 2005 it won its final league to date and in 2006 it reached the Champions League's semifinals. While Sagunto still ranked among Division de Honor top three teams, its only major success in subsequent years was winning the 2008 Spanish Cup (Copa de la Reina)

Due to the lack of sponsorship, in July 2012 it moved back to Valencia to join emerging Valencian club CE Handbol Marítim, which became its successor.

== Names ==
- 1963–1978: Club Medina de Valencia
- 1978–1992: CB Íber
- 1992–1994: CB Mar Valencia
- 1994–1997: Mar El Osito L'Eliana (moved to L'Eliana)
- 1997–1998: CB Milar
- 1998–2003: Mar El Osito L'Eliana
- 2003–2004: Alucine Alser Sagunto (moved to Sagunto)
- 2004–2007: Astroc Sagunto
- 2007–2010: Parc Sagunt
- 2010–2012: Mar Sagunto

== Trophies ==
- División de Honor Femenina (27)
  - 1968, 1969, 1974, 1979 — 1998, 2000 — 2002, 2005
- Copa de la Reina (20)
  - 1981 — 1989, 1991 — 2000, 2008
- Supercopa de España (4)
  - 1999–00, 2001–02, 2002–03, 2005–06
- Copa ABF (2)
  - 2008, 2009
- Champions League (1)
  - 1997
- Cup Winners' Cup (1)
  - 2000
- Champions Trophy (1)
  - 1997

== Notable players ==
- (Spain) Macarena Aguilar
- (Brazil) Bárbara Arenhart
- (Portugal) Alexandrina Barbosa
- (Spain) Nuria Benzal
- (Russia) Svetlana Bogdanova
- (France) Stéphanie Cano
- (Spain) Elisabet Chávez
- (Spain) Verónica Cuadrado
- (Spain) Beatriz Fernández
- (Spain) Begoña Fernández
- (Lithuania) (Austria) Ausra Fridrikas
- (Spain) Marta Mangué
- (Serbia) Tatjana Medved
- (Russia) (Spain) Natalya Morskova
- (Spain) Silvia Navarro
- (Spain) Noelia Oncina
- (Croatia) Iva Perica
- (Spain) Elisabeth Pinedo
- (Serbia and Montenegro) Bojana Radulovics
- (Brazil) Fernanda da Silva
- (Brazil) Darly de Paula
- (Hungary) Beatrix Balogh
