= CB Mar Alicante =

Spanish handball club

Mar Alicante
- Full name: Club Balonmano Mar Alicante
- Short name: Mar Alicante
- Founded: 1996
- Arena: Pabellón Agustinos, Alicante
- Capacity: 1,868
- President: Antonio Herrero
- Head coach: Ignacio Francés
- League: 2ª División Nacional
- 2015–16: 2ª División Nacional, 1st
- Club colours
Home	Away

Club Balonmano Mar Alicante is a Spanish team handball club from Alicante, that plays in Segunda División Nacional, the 3rd-tier handball league for women in Spain. Founded in 1996, the team has achieved its best results in recent years. They were the runners-up of the 2010 Spanish Cup and Supercup and the 2011 Cup Winners' Cup (in their second international appearance following their debut in the 2010 EHF Cup), falling short to SD Itxako and Ferencvárosi TC respectively.

== Honours ==
- Copa ABF: 1
  - Winners: 2010–11
- EHF Cup Winners' Cup: 0
  - Runners-up: 2011
- Copa de la Reina: 0
  - Runners-up: 2010
- Supercopa de España: 0
  - Runners-up: 2010

== Season to season ==
Season	Tier	Division	Pos.	Notes
1996–97	2	Primera Nacional	1st / 1st	Promoted
1997–98	1	División de Honor	11th / 2nd	
1998–99	1	División de Honor	2nd / 6th	
1999–00	1	División de Honor	5th / 7th	Relegated
2000–01	2	Primera Nacional	1st / 1st	Promoted
2001–02	1	División de Honor	5th / 5th	
2002–03	1	División de Honor	11th	
2003–04	1	División de Honor	7th	
2004–05	1	División de Honor	7th	
2005–06	1	División de Honor	6th	

Season	Tier	Division	Pos.	Notes
2006–07	1	División de Honor	9th	
2007–08	1	División de Honor	6th	
2008–09	1	División de Honor	5th	
2009–10	1	División de Honor	4th	
2010–11	1	División de Honor	4th	
2011–12	1	División de Honor	5th	
2012–13	1	División de Honor	9th	
2013–14	1	División de Honor	11th	Relegated
2014–15	3	2ª División Nacional	1st	
2015–16	3	2ª División Nacional	1st	

- 15 seasons in División de Honor

== Notable players ==
- (Spain) Vanesa Amorós
- (Spain) Nuria Benzal
- (Lithuania) Laima Bernatavičiūtė
- (Spain) Mercedes Castellanos
- (France) Véronique Démonière
- (Brazil) Fabiana Diniz
- (Paraguay) Marizza Faría
- (Spain) Beatriz Fernández
- (Spain) Anna Manaut
- (Spain) Carmen Martín
- (Spain) María Muñoz
- (Spain) María Núñez
- (Spain) Isabel Ortuño
- (France) Linda Pradel
- (Portugal) Ana de Sousa
- (Spain) Anna Vicente
- (Russia) Ekaterina Zhukova
- (Norway) Marianne Storkås
