= A Guarda =

- Municipality
- Flag Coat of arms

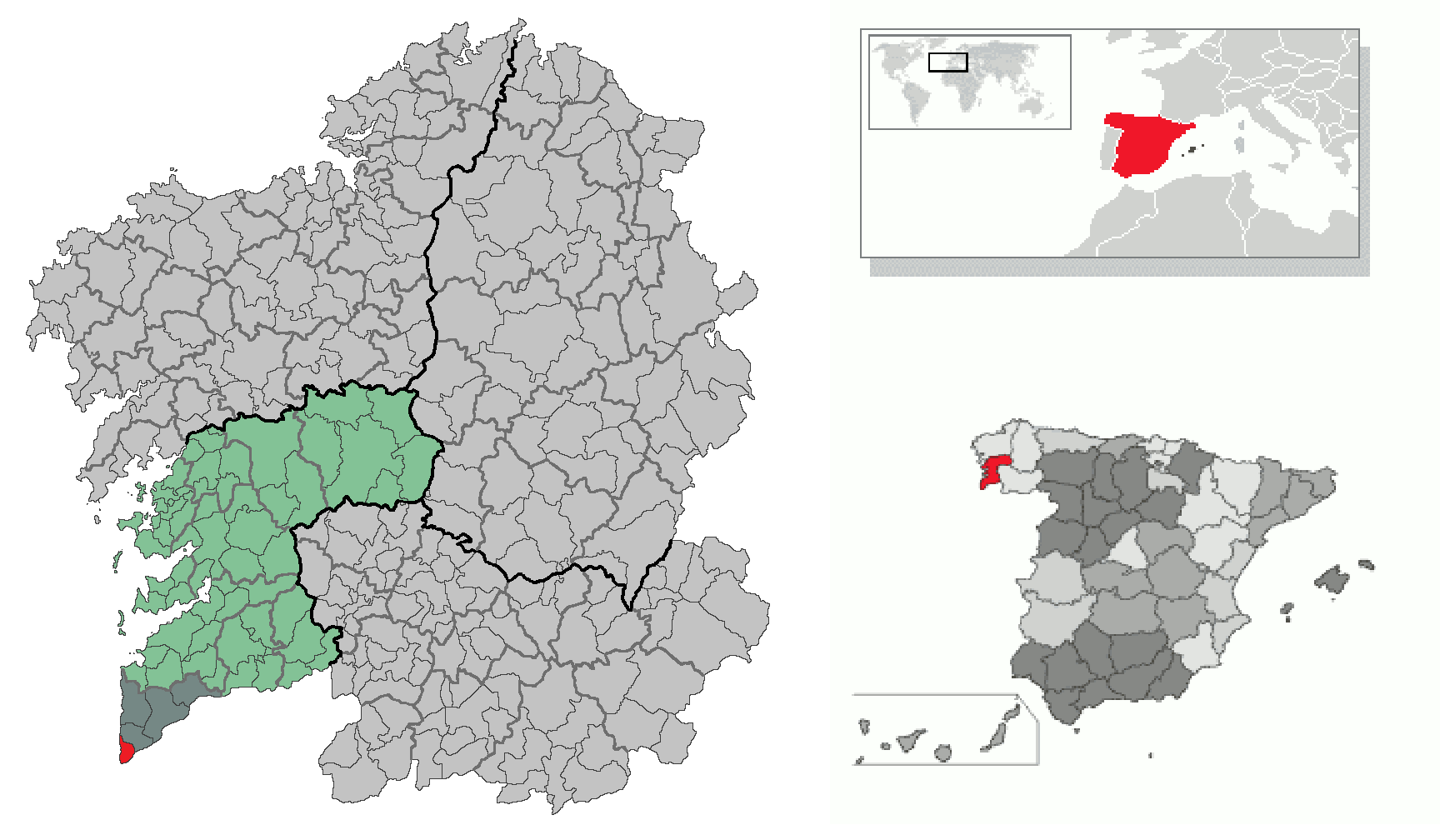
- Location of A Guarda within Galicia
- Coordinates: 41°54′6″N 8°52′31″W
- Country: Spain
- Autonomous community: Galicia
- Province: Pontevedra
- Comarca: O Baixo Miño
- Parroquias: List: Camposancos; A Guarda; Salcidos

Government
  - Type: Concello
  - Mayor: Roberto Carrero (PPdeG)

Area
  - Total: 20.5 km^{2} (7.9 sq mi)

Population (2025-01-01)
  - Total: 9,970
  - Density: 486/km^{2} (1,260/sq mi)
- Demonyms: Guardés (m), guardesa (f)
- Time zone: UTC+1 (CET)
  - Summer (DST): UTC+2 (CET)
- Post code: 36780
- Website: www.aguarda.es

A Guarda (in Spanish 'La Guardia') is a municipality in the province of Pontevedra in the autonomous community of Galicia, in Spain. It is situated in the comarca of Baixo Miño.

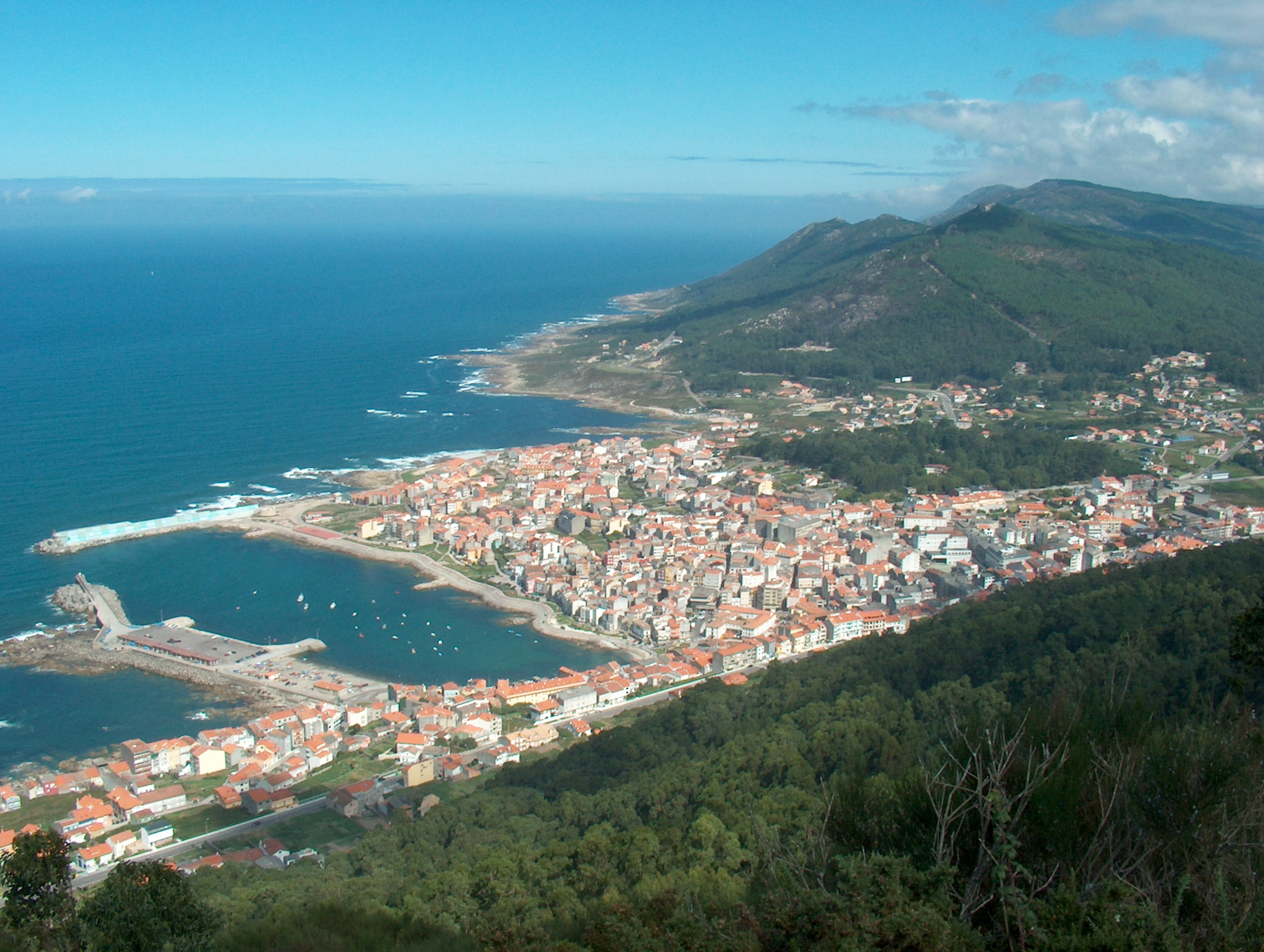

== Demography ==
From:INE Archiv

== Politics ==
Local election results in A Guarda
Party	2007	2011	2015
Spanish Socialist Workers' Party (PSOE-PSdeG)	9	8	7
People's Party (PP)	5	6	5
Galician Nationalist Bloc (BNG)	1	2	3
Galician Convergence (CG)	-	1	1
Terra Galega (TeGa)	2	-	-
CCD	-	-	1

== Sister cities ==
- Santo Domingo, Dominican Republic (2005)
- Póvoa de Varzim, Portugal [2022]

== Notable Natives ==
- Julia Vaquero
- Estela Doiro, Spanish handballer

== See also ==
- List of municipalities in Pontevedra
