= BM Zuazo =

Spanish handball club

- Full name: Club Balonmano Zuazo Femenino
- Founded: 1990
- Arena: Pabellón de Lasesarre, Barakaldo
- Capacity: 2,576
- Head coach: Joseba Rodríquez
- League: División de Honor
- 2024–25: 14th (relegated)

Club Balonmano Zuazo Femenino, also known as Prosetecnisa Zuazo or Hotel Gran Bilbao–Prosetecnisa Zuazo Barakaldo for sponsorship reasons, is a women's handball club from Barakaldo in Spain. CBF Zuazo competes in the División de Honor, the top tier in the Spanish league system.

== Season to season ==
Season	Tier	Division	Pos.	Notes
2000–01	2	Primera Nacional	11th	
2001–02	2	Primera Nacional	8th	
2002–03	2	Primera Nacional	7th	
2003–04	2	Primera Nacional	7th	
2004–05	2	Primera Nacional	4th	
2005–06	2	Primera Nacional	3rd	
2006–07	2	Primera Nacional	4th	
2007–08	2	Primera Nacional	1st	Promoted
2008–09	1	División de Honor	13th	Relegated
2009–10	2	Primera Nacional	1st	
2010–11	2	División de Plata	5th	
2011–12	2	División de Plata	2nd	Promoted
2012–13	1	División de Honor	8th	

Season	Tier	Division	Pos.	Notes
2013–14	1	División de Honor	8th	
2014–15	1	División de Honor	8th	
2015–16	1	División de Honor	6th	
2016–17	1	División de Honor	5th	
2017–18	1	División de Honor	7th	
2018–19	1	División de Honor	9th	
2019–20	1	División de Honor	10th	
2020–21	1	División de Honor	10th	
2021–22	1	División de Honor	9th	
2022–23	1	División de Honor	9th	Relegated
2023–24	2	División de Honor Oro	3rd	Promoted
2024–25	1	División de Honor	14th	Relegated

== European record ==
Season	Competition	Round	Club	Home	Away	Aggregate
2016–17	Challenge Cup	R3	(Sweden) H 65 Höör	21–20	25–31	46–51

== Team ==
=== Current squad ===
Squad for the 2020–21 season

Goalkeepers

- 13 (Spain) Ariadna Gonzalez Peraza
- 16 (Spain) Maddi Aalla

Wingers
RW

- 15 (Spain) Maider Barros
- 25 (Spain) Anne Erauskin

LW

- (Spain) Isi Fernandez-Agustí
- 5 (Spain) Estibaliz Velasco

Line Players

- 7 (Spain) Ainhoa Hernández
- (Spain) Naia Puigbo

Back players

LB

- 22 (Spain) June Loidi Etxaniz

CB

- 3 (Spain) Alba Sánchez
- 24 (Spain) Ane Encina
- 55 (Spain) Magdalena Fernandez-Agustí

RB

- 8 (Spain) Oihane Manrique
- 35 (Spain) Maddi Bengoetxea Erriondo

=== Transfers ===
Transfers for the 2020-2021

Joining

Leaving

- (Spain) Amaia González de Garibay

== Notable players ==
- (Spain) Mercedes Castellanos
- (Spain) Naiara Egozkue
- (Spain) Ainhoa Hernández
- (Germany) Laura Steinbach
- (Spain) Tania Yáñez
- (Hungary) Viktória Soós
