= BM Bera Bera =

Spanish women's handball club

Bera Bera Eskubaloia
- Short name: Bera Bera
- Founded: 1983
- Arena: Polideportivo Jose A. Gasca, San Sebastián
- Capacity: 2,800
- President: Fernando Diez Mintegi
- Head coach: Imanol Álvarez
- League: División de Honor
- 2023–24: Champion
- Club colours
Home	Away

Bera Bera Eskubaloia is a Basque women's handball club from San Sebastián competing in División de Honor since 1998. It was previously known as Corteblanco Bidebieta, having played in top-flight since 1989.

Bera Bera has won nine Spanish championships and nine national cups, and is a regular of European competitions. Its best result to date was reaching the Cup Winners' Cup's semifinals in 2008 after beating Budućnost Podgorica and KIF Vejen, and qualifying for the Champions League group stage in 2013–14.

== Club's names ==
- Sociedad Cultural Recreativa Deportiva Bidebieta – (1983–1998)
- Bera Bera Eskubaloia – (1998–)

=== Sponsors ===
- Corteblanco – (1989–1998)
- Meyba – (1990–91)
- Akaba – (1999–2010)
- Super Amara – (2016–present)

== Season to season ==
- As Bidebieta:

Season	Tier	Division	Pos.	Notes
1985–86	2	Primera Nacional	1st (Group D)	
1986–87	2	Primera Nacional	3rd (Group C)	
1987–88	2	Primera Nacional	1st (Group B)	
1988–89	2	Primera Nacional	1st (Group A)	
1989–90	2	Primera Nacional	1st (Group A)	↑
1990-91	1	División de Honor	10th	
1991-92	1	División de Honor	6th	
1992-93	1	División de Honor	4th	
1993-94	1	División de Honor	6th	
1994-95	1	División de Honor	3rd	
1995-96	1	División de Honor	4th	
1996-97	1	División de Honor	4th	
1997-98	1	División de Honor	4th	

- As Bera Bera Eskubaloia:

Season	Tier	Division	Pos.	Notes
1998–99	1	División de Honor	7th	
1999–00	1	División de Honor	5th	
2000–01	1	División de Honor	5th	
2001–02	1	División de Honor	4th	
2002–03	1	División de Honor	5th	
2003–04	1	División de Honor	4th	
2004–05	1	División de Honor	5th	
2005–06	1	División de Honor	5th	
2006–07	1	División de Honor	5th	Cup winner
2007–08	1	División de Honor	5th	
2008–09	1	División de Honor	4th	Cup winner
2009–10	1	División de Honor	6th	
2010–11	1	División de Honor	5th	
2011–12	1	División de Honor	2nd	

Season	Tier	Division	Pos.	Notes
2012–13	1	División de Honor	1st	Cup winner
2013–14	1	División de Honor	1st	Cup winner
2014–15	1	División de Honor	1st	
2015–16	1	División de Honor	1st	Cup winner
2016–17	1	División de Honor	2nd	
2017–18	1	División de Honor	1st	
2018–19	1	División de Honor	2nd	Cup winner
2019–20	1	División de Honor	1st	
2020–21	1	División de Honor	1st	
2021–22	1	División de Honor	1st	
2022–23	1	División de Honor	3rd	Cup winner
2023–24	1	División de Honor	1st	Cup winner
2024–25	1	División de Honor		Cup winner

== Trophies ==
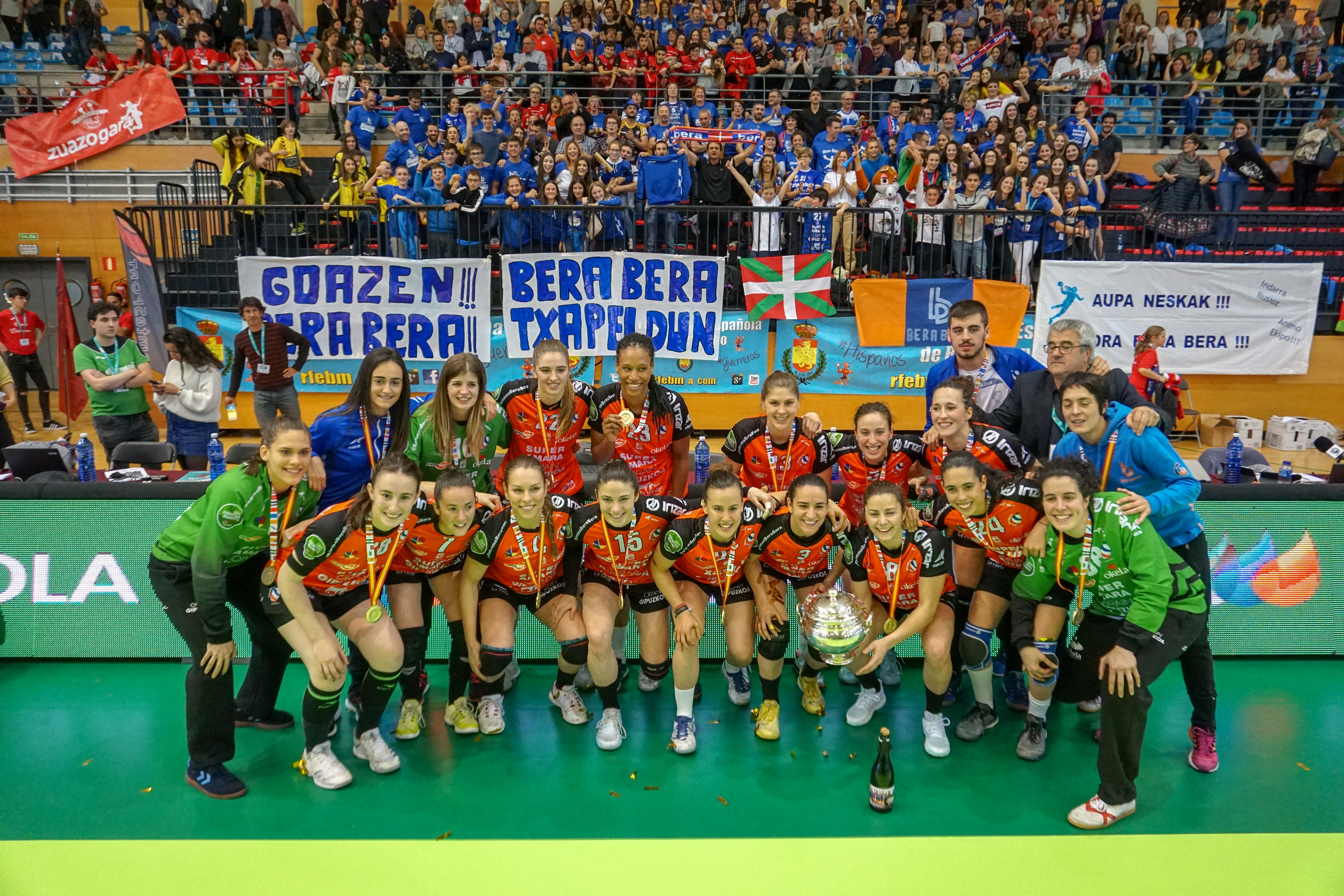
Bera Bera's squad with the Copa de la Reina trophy, 2019

División de Honor (National Championship of Spain)

- Champions (9)
  - 2012–13, 2013–14, 2014–15, 2015–16, 2017–18, 2019-20, 2020-21, 2021-22, 2023–24

Copa de la Reina (Cup of Spain)

- Champions (9)
  - 2008, 2010, 2013, 2014, 2016, 2019, 2023, 2024, 2025

Supercopa de España (Supercup of Spain)

- Champions (10)
  - 2008, 2012, 2013, 2014, 2015, 2016, 2018, 2022, 2023, 2024

== European record ==
Season	Competition	Round	Club	1st leg	2nd leg	Aggregate
2024–25	EHF European League	R3	(Poland) MKS Lublin	26–20	19–23	45–43
2024–25	EHF European League	Group stage	(Germany) HSG Bensheim-Auerbach	29–31	32–34	2nd place
2024–25	EHF European League	Group stage	(Norway) Fredrikstad BK	32–26	24–33	2nd place
2024–25	EHF European League	Group stage	(France) Paris 92	33–28	33–27	2nd place
2024–25	EHF European League	QF	(Germany) HSG Blomberg-Lippe	25–28	26–24	51–52
2023–24	EHF European League	R3	(Norway) Sola HK	39–32	28–34	66–67
2022–23	EHF European League	R3	(France) ESBF Besançon	29–32	24–27	53–59
2021–22	EHF European League	R2	(France) Paris 92	27–27	26–21	53–48
2021–22	EHF European League	R3	(Romania) SCM Râmnicu Vâlcea	27–29	28–34	55–63
2020–21	EHF European League	R3	(Russia) HC Zvezda	27–27	24–29	51–56
2019–20	EHF Cup	R1	(Switzerland) LK Zug	30-16	45-31	75-47
2019–20	EHF Cup	R2	(Romania) ASC Corona 2010 Brașov	30-35	32-31	62-66
2018–19	EHF Champions League	Q1	(Germany) SG BBM Bietigheim	27-33		3rd place
2018–19	EHF Champions League	Q1	(Italy) Jomi Salerno	40-20		3rd place
2018–19	EHF Cup	R3	(Hungary) Dunaújvárosi KKA	26-18	22-23	48–41
2018–19	EHF Cup	Group D	(Croatia) Podravka Koprivnica	29-32	32-26	4th place
2018–19	EHF Cup	Group D	(Romania) SCM Craiova	32-21	23-26	4th place
2018–19	EHF Cup	Group D	(Denmark) Nykøbing Falster Håndbold	26-31	28-36	4th place
2017–18	EHF Cup	R1	(Portugal) Colégio de Gaia	26-25	31-23	57-48
2017–18	EHF Cup	R2	(Turkey) Kastamonu Belediyesi	35-35	22-24	57-59
2016–17	EHF Champions League	Q1	(Austria) Hypo Niederösterreich	21–25		3rd place
2016–17	EHF Champions League	Q1	(Belarus) HC Gomel	28–20		3rd place
2016–17	EHF Cup	R3	(France) Brest BH	20–25	19–23	39–48
2015–16	EHF Cup	R3	(Slovakia) IUVENTA Michalovce	29-34	24-24	53-58
2014–15	EHF Cup	R2	(Italy) Jomi Salerno	29-19	28-20	57-39
2014–15	EHF Cup	L16	(Turkey) Muratpaşa Belediyesi	30-30	27-29	57-59
2013–14	EHF Champions League	Group D	(North Macedonia) ZRK Vardar	19-23	20-30	4th place
2013–14	EHF Champions League	Group D	(Croatia) Podravka Koprivnica	18-29	28-19	4th place
2013–14	EHF Champions League	Group D	(Norway) Larvik HK	17-27	21-29	4th place
2012–13	EHF Champions League	Q1	(Poland) Vistal Gdynia	22-31		3rd place
2012–13	EHF Champions League	Q1	(Switzerland) LC Brühl	33-23		3rd place
2012–13	EHF Cup Winners' Cup	R3	(Romania) HC Danubius Galati	26-23	22-19	48-42
2012–13	EHF Cup Winners' Cup	L16	(Poland) Vistal Gdynia	20-32	29-17	49-49
2012–13	EHF Cup Winners' Cup	QF	(Germany) Thüringer HC	15-33	26-38	41-71

== Team ==
=== Current squad ===
Squad for the 2026–27 season

Goalkeepers

- 55 (Spain) Lucía Prades
- 77 (France) Amandine Balzinc

Wingers
RW

- 18 (Spain) Maitane Etxeberria (injured)
- 25 (Spain) Anne Erauskin (injured)
- 92 (Spain) Oihana Murgiondo

LW

- 06 (France) Marie Louis (injured)
- 24 (Spain) Elena Amores

Line players

- 31 (Argentina) Giuliana Gavilan
- 33 (Spain) Kelly Fonkeng

Back Players

- 18 (Argentina) Elke Karsten (injured)
- 19 (Spain) Ester Somaza (injured)
- 22 (France) Mathilde Plotton
- 70 (Spain) Carmen Arroyo

CB

- 02 (Spain) Elba Álvarez
- 14 (Netherlands) Lisanne Kruijswijk (injured)

RB

- 09 (Spain) Elene Fresco
- 89 (Japan) Sora Ishikawa
- 97 (Angola) (Democratic Republic of the Congo) Alexandra Shunu

=== Transfers ===
Transfers for the 2027–2028 season

Joining

Leaving

=== Technical staff ===
- (Spain) Head Coach: Jon Begiristain
- (Spain) Assistant Coach:

== Notable players ==
- (Spain) Nely Carla Alberto
- (Angola) Azenaide Carlos
- (Spain) Mihaela Ciobanu
- (Brazil) Lígia Costa
- (Spain) Verónica Cuadrado
- (Brazil) Fabiana Diniz
- (Spain) Patricia Elorza
- (Spain) Beatriz Fernández
- (Spain) Alicia Fernández Fraga
- (Spain) Tatiana Garmendia
- (France) Amélie Goudjo
- (Denmark) Anette Hoffmann
- (Denmark) Janne Kolling
- (France) Alexandra Lacrabère
- (Spain) Marta López
- (Spain) Ana Martínez
- (Argentina) Antonela Mena
- (France) Wendy Obein
- (Serbia) Svetlana Obucina
- (Brazil) Darly de Paula
- (Spain) Elisabeth Pinedo
- (Spain) Montserrat Puche
- (Russia) Anna Punko
- (Brazil) Fernanda da Silva
- (Spain) Ana Temprano
- (France) Raphaëlle Tervel
- (Serbia) Katarina Tomašević
- (Spain) Tania Yáñez
- (Brazil) Adriana Cardoso de Castro
- (Spain) Esther Arrojeria
- (Spain) Alba Menéndez
