= Copa de la Reina de Balonmano =

- Founded: 1980
- No. of teams: 8
- Country: Spain
- Confederation: EHF
- Most recent champion: (Basque Country (autonomous community)) Super Amara Bera Bera (10th title) (2025–26)
- Most titles: (Valencian Community) Sagunto/Mar Valencia (20 titles)
- Broadcasters: Teledeporte, RTVE Play
- Copa de la Reina 2026

The Copa de la Reina de Balonmano (English: Queen's Cup of Handball) is an annual tournament for Spanish women's handball clubs organized by the Royal Spanish Handball Federation. Founded in 1980, it is contested in spring by the top eight teams in the Liga ABF's table. BM Sagunto is the most successful team with twenty titles, while Mavi Nuevas Tecnologías has won the last edition.

== List of champions ==
Season	Venue	Champion	Runners-up	Score
2026	San Sebastián	Super Amara Bera Bera	Mecalia Atlético Guardés	26–21
2025	Granollers	Super Amara Bera Bera	Replasa Beti-Onak	30–21
2024	San Sebastián	Super Amara Bera Bera	Caja Rural Aula Valladolid	32–24
2023	Málaga	Super Amara Bera Bera	KH-7 Granollers	31–25
2022	San Sebastián	Costa del Sol Málaga	Mecalia Atlético Guardés	33–26
2021	Telde	Elche Visitelche.com	Aula Alimentos de Valladolid	34–26
2020	Alhaurín de la Torre	Rincón Fertilidad Málaga	Elche Visitelche.com	24–20
2019	Barakaldo	Super Amara Bera Bera	Aula Alimentos de Valladolid	30–17
2018	Málaga	Mavi Nuevas Tecnologías	Super Amara Bera Bera	20–17
2017	O Porriño	Rocasa G.C. ACE	Bera Bera	27–26
2016	O Porriño	Bera Bera	Prosetecnisa Zuazo	33–17
2015	Castellón de la Plana	Rocasa G.C. ACE	Bera Bera	20–19
2014	Alcobendas	Bera Bera	Rocasa ACE G.C.	26–21
2013	O Porriño/A Guarda	Bera Bera	Ro'Casa ACE	25–24
2012	Altea	Asfi Itxako	Bera Bera	35–26
2010–2011	Telde	Itxako Reyno de Navarra	Elda Prestigio	29–21
2009–2010	León	Itxako Reyno de Navarra	Mar Alicante	–
2008–2009	Monòver	Akaba Bera Bera	Prosolia Gaviota Elda Prestigio	–
2007–2008	Estella-Lizarra	Parc Sagunto	Akaba Bera Bera	–
2006–2007	L'Eliana	Akaba Bera Bera	Cementos La Unión Ribarroja	–
2005–2006	León	Cementos La Unión Ribarroja	Akaba Bera Bera	–
2004–2005	Vícar	Orsan Elda Prestigio	Astroc Sagunto	–
2003–2004	Elda	Ferrobús Mislata	El Osito L'Eliana	–
2002–2003	L'Eliana	Ferrobús Mislata	El Osito L'Eliana	–
2001–2002	Telde	Alsa Elda Prestigio	Ferrobús Mislata	–
2000–2001	L'Eliana	Ferrobús KU Mislata	El Osito L'Eliana	–
1999–2000	Almería	Milar L'Eliana	El Ferrobús Mislata	–
1998–1999	L'Eliana	Milar L'Eliana	Alsa Elda Prestigio	–
1997–1998	L'Eliana	El Osito L'Eliana	El Ferrobús Mislata	–
1996–1997	Elda	El Osito L'Eliana	Corteblanco Bidebieta	–
1995–1996	San Sebastián	El Osito L'Eliana	Corteblanco Bidebieta	–
1994–1995	Leganés	El Osito L'Eliana	Leganés	–
1993–1994	Leganés	Mar Valencia	Leganés	–
1992–1993	Pinto	Mar Valencia	Corteblanco Bidebieta	–
1991–1992	Riba-roja de Túria	Íber Valencia	Constructora Estellés	–
1990–1991	Las Palmas	Íber Valencia	Pegaso	–
1989–1990	Getafe	Constructora Estellés	Universidad de Valladolid	21–17
1988–1989	Valencia	Íber Valencia	Mades Onda	–
1987–1988	Las Rozas	Íber Valencia	Leganés	–
1986–1987	Castelldefels	Íber Valencia	Mades Onda	–
1985–1986	Hernani	Íber Valencia	Mades Onda	–
1984–1985	Valencia	Íber Valencia	Mades Onda	–
1983–1984	Toledo	Íber Valencia	Hernani	–
1982–1983	Leganés	Íber Valencia	Leganés	–
1981–1982	Castellón	Íber Valencia	Zaragoza	–
1980–1981	Úbeda	Íber Valencia	Ayete	–
1979–1980	Huelva	Castelldefels	Íber Valencia	–

=== Winners by titles ===
Club	Winners	Runners-up	Winning years
Valencia/Sagunto	20	5	1981, 1982, 1983, 1984, 1985, 1986, 1987, 1988, 1989, 1991, 1992, 1993, 1994, 1995, 1996, 1997, 1998, 1999, 2000, 2008
Bera Bera	10	9	2007, 2009, 2013, 2014, 2016, 2019, 2023, 2024, 2025, 2026
Amadeo Tortajada	5	5	1990, 1992, 2001, 2003, 2004, 2006
Itxako	3	0	2010, 2011, 2012
Elda	2	3	2002, 2005
Rocasa G.C. ACE	2	2	2015, 2017
Costa del Sol Málaga	2	0	2020, 2022
BM Elche	1	1	2021
Castelldefels	1	0	1980
La Calzada Gijón	1	0	2018
Leganés	0	4	
Mades Onda	0	4	
BM Aula Cultural	0	3	
Mecalia Atlético Guardés	0	2	
Ayete	0	1	
Zaragoza	0	1	
Hernani	0	1	
Universidad de Valladolid	0	1	
Pegaso	0	1	
Mar Alicante	0	1	
BM Zuazo	0	1	
KH-7 Granollers	0	1	
Replasa Beti-Onak	0	1	

== See also ==
- División de Honor
- Supercopa de España
