= 2016–17 División de Honor Femenina de Balonmano =

Spanish women's handball season

División de Honor
- Season: 2016–17
- Champions: Atlético Guardés
- Relegated: Alcobendas & León
- EHF Champions League: Atlético Guardés
- EHF Cup: Bera Bera
- EHF Challenge Cup: Rocasa G.C. ACE, Rincón Fertilidad Málaga
- Top goalscorer: Silvia Arderíus, 198

The División de Honor Femenina 2016–17, or Liga Loterías 2016-17 after sponsorship of Loterías y Apuestas del Estado, was the 60th season of women's handball top flight in Spain since its establishment. Mecalia Atlético Guardés won their first División de Honor title ever. The season began on 10 September, 2016 and the last matchday was played on 27 May, 2017. A total of 14 teams took part the league, 12 of which had already contested in the 2015–16 season, and two of which were promoted from the División de Plata 2015–16.

Atlético Guardés won the championship by a two-point margin over 2nd team in the standings, Bera Bera. Further, regarding to European competitions for 2017–18 season; Atlético Guardés qualified to EHF Champions League, Bera Bera. qualified to EHF Cup and Rocasa G.C. and Rincón Fertilidad Málaga to EHF Challenge Cup.

== Promotion and relegation ==
Teams promoted from 2015–16 División de Plata

- BM Base Villaverde
- Mavi Nuevas Tecnologías

Teams relegated to 2017–18 División de Plata

- Helvetia Alcobendas
- Esencia 27 ULE CLEBA León

== Teams ==
2016–17 División de Honor teams
Canary Islands

Team	City	Stadium	Capacity
Súper Amara Bera Bera	San Sebastián	Bidebieta	1,000
Rocasa Gran Canaria ACE	Telde	Antonio Moreno	800
Mecalia Atl. Guardés	A Guarda	A Sangriña	1,500
Helvetia Alcobendas	Alcobendas	Los Sueños	1,000
Godoy Maceira Porriño	O Porriño	Polideportivo Municipal	1,600
Prosetecnisa Zuazo	Barakaldo	Lasesarre	2,576
Aula Valladolid	Valladolid	Huerta del Rey	3,500
Canyamelar Valencia	Valencia	El Cabanyal	1,200
Rincón Fertilidad Málaga	Málaga	Carranque	1,500
Esencia 27 ULE CLEBA León	León	Palacio de los Deportes	6,500
Elche Mustang	Elche	Poliesportiu de Carrús	800
KH-7 Granollers	Granollers	Palau d'Esports	5,685
Base Villaverde	Madrid	Plata y Castañar	1,100
Mavi Nuevas Tecnologías	Gijón	La Arena	1,500

== Final standings ==
Pos	Team	Pld	W	D	L	GF	GA	GD	Pts	Qualification or relegation
1	Mecalia Atl. Guardés	26	24	0	2	729	551	+178	48	Champions and Qualified to EHF Champions League
2	Súper Amara Bera Bera	26	23	0	3	713	544	+169	46	Qualified to EHF Cup
3	Rocasa G.C. ACE	26	20	0	6	767	635	+132	40	Qualified to EHF Challenge Cup
4	Rincón Fertilidad Málaga	26	16	2	8	696	688	+8	34	Qualified to EHF Challenge Cup
5	Prosetecnisa Zuazo	26	16	2	8	665	619	+46	34	
6	Aula Valladolid	26	13	4	9	759	726	+33	30	
7	Godoy Maceira Porriño	26	12	1	13	658	670	−12	25	
8	Canyamelar Valencia	26	9	1	16	611	687	−76	19	
9	Elche Mustang	26	9	1	16	647	717	−70	19	
10	KH-7 Granollers	26	8	2	16	644	650	−6	18	
11	Mavi Nuevas Tecnologías	26	8	2	16	620	650	−30	18	
12	Base Villaverde	26	6	2	18	686	828	−142	14	
13	Helvetia Alcobendas	26	6	1	19	569	669	−100	13	Relegation to División de Plata
14	Esencia 27 ULE CLEBA León	26	2	2	22	626	756	−130	6	Relegation to División de Plata

Updated to match(es) played on unknown. Source: División de Honor and rfebm.com
Rules for classification: 1) points; 2) head-to-head points; 3) head-to-head goal difference; 4) goal difference; 5) number of goals scored

2016–17 División de Honor Femenina winners
(Galicia (Spain))
Mecalia Atlético Guardés
First title

== Top goalscorers ==
Rank	Name	Team	Goals	GP	GPG
1	(Spain) Silvia Arderíus	Aula Valladolid	198	26	7.62
2	(Spain) Sara Gil de la Vega	Godoy Maceira Porriño	191	26	7.35
3	(Spain) Nerea Nieto	Base Villaverde	170	23	7.39
4	(Spain) Patricia Alonso	Canyamelar Valencia	168	26	6.46
5	(Spain) Almudena Rodríguez	Rocasa G.C. ACE	142	24	5.92
6	(Spain) Laura Hernández	Elche Mustang	138	25	5.52
7	(Spain) Ivet Musons	Elche Mustang	135	21	6.43
8	(Spain) Amaia González de Garibay	Aula Valladolid	133	26	5.12
9	(Spain) África Sempere	Mecalia Atl. Guardés	131	25	5.24
10	(Spain) María Luján	Rocasa G.C. ACE	131	26	5.04

== See also ==
- Liga ASOBAL 2016–17
