= 2018–19 División de Honor Femenina de Balonmano =

Spanish women's handball season

División de Honor
- Season: 2018–19
- Champions: Rocasa G.C. ACE
- Relegated: CB Morvedre & Canyamelar Valencia & BM Castellón
- EHF Champions League: Rocasa G.C. ACE
- EHF Cup: Super Amara Bera Bera
- EHF Challenge Cup: Mecalia Atl. Guardés, KH-7 Granollers
- Top goalscorer: Judith Vizuete, 179
- Biggest home win: Super Amara Bera Bera 46–18 BM Castellón (6 October 2018)
- Biggest away win: Canyamelar Valencia 18–37 Mecalia Atl. Guardés (2 February 2019)

The División de Honor Femenina 2018–19, or Liga Guerreras Iberdrola 2018-19 after sponsorship of Iberdrola, was the 62nd season of women's handball top flight in Spain since its establishment. The season began on 7 September. A total of 14 teams take part the league, 12 of which had already contested in the 2017–18 season, and two of which were promoted from the División de Plata 2017–18.

== Promotion and relegation ==
Teams promoted from 2017–18 División de Plata

- CB Morvedre
- Helvetia Alcobendas

Teams relegated to 2019–20 División de Plata

- CB Morvedre
- Canyamelar Valencia
- BM Castellón

== Teams ==
2018–19 División de Honor teams
Canary Islands

| Team | City | Stadium | Capacity |
|---|---|---|---|
| Super Amara Bera Bera | San Sebastián | Bidebieta | 2,800 |
| Mecalia Atl. Guardés | A Guarda | A Sangriña | 1,500 |
| Rocasa G.C. ACE | Telde | Antonio Moreno | 800 |
| BMC Liberbank Gijón | Gijón | La Arena | 800 |
| Aula Alimentos de Valladolid | Valladolid | Huerta del Rey | 3,500 |
| Rincón Fertilidad Málaga | Málaga | Carranque | 1,500 |
| Hotel Gran Bilbao-Prosetecnisa Zuazo | Barakaldo | Lasesarre | 2,576 |
| KH-7 Granollers | Granollers | Palau d'Esports | 5,685 |
| Godoy Maceira Porriño | O Porriño | Pavillón Municipal | 2,000 |
| Elche Mustang | Elche | Poliesportiu de Carrús | 800 |
| Canyamelar Valencia | Valencia | El Cabanyal | 1,200 |
| BM Castellón | Castellón de la Plana | Fernando Úbeda Mir | 500 |
| Helvetia Alcobendas | Alcobendas | Los Sueños | 1,000 |
| Morvedre | Sagunto | René Marigil | 2,000 |

== Final standings ==
| Pos | Team | Pld | W | D | L | GF | GA | GD | Pts | Qualification or relegation |
|---|---|---|---|---|---|---|---|---|---|---|
| 1 | Rocasa G.C. ACE | 26 | 22 | 1 | 3 | 708 | 597 | +111 | 45 | Champions and Qualified to EHF Champions League |
| 2 | Super Amara Bera Bera | 26 | 20 | 1 | 5 | 776 | 594 | +182 | 41 | Qualified to EHF Cup |
| 3 | Mecalia Atl. Guardés | 26 | 17 | 1 | 8 | 741 | 623 | +118 | 35 | Qualified to EHF Challenge Cup |
| 4 | KH-7 Granollers | 26 | 15 | 4 | 7 | 734 | 656 | +78 | 34 | Qualified to EHF Challenge Cup |
| 5 | BMC Liberbank Gijón | 26 | 15 | 3 | 8 | 692 | 639 | +53 | 33 | |
| 6 | Rincón Fertilidad Málaga | 26 | 15 | 3 | 8 | 741 | 686 | +55 | 33 | |
| 7 | Elche Mustang | 26 | 14 | 3 | 9 | 670 | 644 | +26 | 31 | |
| 8 | Aula Alimentos de Valladolid (Note: Copa de la Reina de Balonmano Runners-Up.) | 26 | 13 | 2 | 11 | 652 | 622 | +30 | 28 | Qualified to EHF Challenge Cup |
| 9 | Hotel Gran Bilbao-Prosetecnisa Zuazo | 26 | 11 | 1 | 14 | 668 | 665 | +3 | 23 | |
| 10 | Godoy Maceira Porriño | 26 | 9 | 0 | 17 | 582 | 675 | −93 | 18 | |
| 11 | Helvetia Alcobendas | 26 | 6 | 5 | 15 | 590 | 675 | −85 | 17 | |
| 12 | CB Morvedre | 26 | 5 | 2 | 19 | 591 | 691 | −100 | 12 | Relegation to División de Plata |
| 13 | Canyamelar Valencia | 26 | 4 | 1 | 21 | 559 | 754 | −195 | 9 | Relegation to División de Plata |
| 14 | BM Castellón | 26 | 2 | 1 | 23 | 545 | 728 | −183 | 5 | Relegation to División de Plata |

Source: División de Honor and rfebm.com
Rules for classification: 1) points; 2) head-to-head points; 3) head-to-head goal difference; 4) goal difference; 5) number of goals scored
Notes:

2018–19 División de Honor Femenina winners
(Gran Canaria)
Rocasa G.C. ACE
First title

== Top goalscorers ==
| Rank | Name | Team | Goals | GP | GPG |
|---|---|---|---|---|---|
| 1 | (Spain) Judith Vizuete | KH-7 Granollers | 179 | 26 | 6.88 |
| 2 | (Spain) Soledad López | Rincón Fertilidad Málaga | 153 | 26 | 5.88 |
| 3 | (Spain) Jennifer Gutiérrez Bermejo | Elche Mustang | 148 | 25 | 5.92 |
| 4 | (Spain) Sara Gil de la Vega | Super Amara Bera Bera | 136 | 26 | 5.23 |
| 5 | (Spain) Laura Hernández Selva | Elche Mustang | 134 | 22 | 6.09 |
| 6 | (Spain) Noelia López | BM Castellón | 133 | 24 | 5.54 |
| 7 | (Spain) Ana Martínez | Elche Mustang | 127 | 26 | 4.88 |
| 8 | (Brazil) Adriana Cardoso de Castro | Super Amara Bera Bera | 126 | 23 | 5.48 |
| 9 | (Spain) Aida Palicio | BMC Liberbank Gijón | 124 | 25 | 4.96 |
| 10 | (Cuba) Lorena Téllez | BMC Liberbank Gijón | 122 | 26 | 4.69 |

== See also ==
- Liga ASOBAL 2018–19
