= 2017–18 División de Honor Femenina de Balonmano =

Spanish women's handball season

División de Honor
- Season: 2017–18
- Champions: Bera Bera
- Relegated: Castellón & Base Villaverde
- EHF Champions League: Bera Bera
- EHF Cup: Atlético Guardés
- EHF Challenge Cup: Rocasa G.C. ACE, Mavi Nuevas Tecnologías
- Top goalscorer: María Prieto O'Mullony, 228

The División de Honor Femenina 2017–18, or Liga Guerreras Iberdrola 2017-18 after sponsorship of Iberdrola, was the 61st season of women's handball top flight in Spain since its establishment. Bera Bera won his fifth title. The season began on 6 September, 2017 and the last matchday was played on 26 May, 2018. A total of 14 teams took part the league, 12 of which had already contested in the 2016–17 season, and two of which were promoted from the División de Plata 2016–17.

Atlético Guardés won the championship with the same points as the 2nd team in the standings, Mecalia Atlético Guardés. Further, regarding to European competitions for 2018–19 season; Bera Bera qualified to EHF Champions League, Atlético Guardés qualified to EHF Cup and Rocasa G.C. and Mavi Nuevas Tecnologías to EHF Challenge Cup.

== Promotion and relegation ==
Teams promoted from 2016–17 División de Plata

- ANTS:BFIT-MuchoTicket
- BM Castellón

Teams relegated to 2018–19 División de Plata

- ANTS:BFIT-MuchoTicket
- BM Base Villaverde

== Teams ==
2017–18 División de Honor teams
Canary Islands

Team	City	Stadium	Capacity
Mecalia Atl. Guardés	A Guarda	A Sangriña	1,500
Súper Amara Bera Bera	San Sebastián	Bidebieta	1,000
Rocasa Gran Canaria ACE	Telde	Antonio Moreno	800
Rincón Fertilidad Málaga	Málaga	Carranque	1,500
Hotel Gran Bilbao-Prosetecnisa Zuazo	Barakaldo	Lasesarre	2,576
Aula Alimentos de Valladolid	Valladolid	Huerta del Rey	3,500
Godoy Maceira Porriño	O Porriño	Polideportivo Municipal	1,600
Canyamelar Valencia	Valencia	El Cabanyal	1,200
Elche Mustang	Elche	Poliesportiu de Carrús	800
KH-7 Granollers	Granollers	Palau d'Esports	5,685
Mavi Nuevas Tecnologías	Gijón	La Arena	1,500
Base Villaverde	Madrid	Plata y Castañar	1,100
ANTS:BFIT-MuchoTicket	Santa Eulària des Riu	Pavelló de Santa Eulària	700
BM Castellón	Castellón de la Plana	Fernando Úbeda Mir	600

== Final standings ==
Pos	Team	Pld	W	D	L	GF	GA	GD	Pts	Qualification or relegation
1	Super Amara Bera Bera	26	23	0	3	767	597	+170	46	Champions and Qualified to EHF Champions League
2	Mecalia Atl. Guardés	26	23	0	3	806	617	+189	46	Qualified to EHF Cup
3	Rocasa G.C. ACE	26	19	1	6	773	637	+136	39	Qualified to EHF Challenge Cup
4	Mavi Nuevas Tecnologías (Note: Mavi Nuevas Tecnologías resigned to play the EHF Challenge Cup.)	26	17	1	8	683	583	+100	35	Qualified to EHF Challenge Cup
5	Aula Alimentos de Valladolid	26	17	1	8	714	621	+93	35	
6	Rincón Fertilidad Málaga	26	17	0	9	659	597	+62	34	
7	Hotel Gran Bilbao-Prosetecnisa Zuazo	26	13	3	10	723	711	+12	29	
8	KH-7 Granollers	26	12	2	12	715	658	+57	26	
9	Godoy Maceira Porriño	26	10	1	15	638	692	−54	21	
10	ANTS:BFIT-MuchoTicket (Note: ANTS:BFIT-MuchoTicket resigned to its place in the league after the end of the season, being this one given to BM Castellón.)	26	8	2	16	658	700	−42	18	Relegation to División de Plata
11	Elche Mustang	26	8	0	18	600	679	−79	16	
12	Canyamelar Valencia	26	4	3	19	626	715	−89	11	
13	BM Castellón (Note: BM Castellón avoided relegation after the resignation of ANTS:BFIT-MuchoTicket.)	26	4	0	22	569	801	−232	8	
14	Base Villaverde	26	0	0	26	607	930	−323	0	Relegation to División de Plata

Source: División de Honor and rfebm.com
Rules for classification: 1) points; 2) head-to-head points; 3) head-to-head goal difference; 4) goal difference; 5) number of goals scored
Notes:

2017–18 División de Honor Femenina winners
(Basque Country (autonomous community))
Super Amara Bera Bera
Fifth title

== Top goalscorers ==
Rank	Name	Team	Goals	GP	GPG
1	(Spain) María Prieto O'Mullony	Aula Alimentos de Valladolid	228	26	8.77
2	(Spain) Ivet Musons	Elche Mustang	158	26	6.08
3	(Spain) Carmen Campos	ANTS:BFIT-MuchoTicket	153	25	6.12
4	(Spain) Haridian Rodríguez	Rocasa G.C. ACE	141	26	5.42
5	(Spain) Sara Gil de la Vega	Godoy Maceira Porriño	138	21	6.57
6	(Spain) Judith Vizuete	KH-7 Granollers	135	26	5.19
7	(Sweden) Tilda Matthijs	KH-7 Granollers	133	26	5.12
8	(Spain) Noelia López	BM Castellón	132	26	5.08
9	(Portugal) Soraia Lopes	Mavi Nuevas Tecnologías	123	26	4.73
10	(Spain) María Luján	Hotel Gran Bilbao-Prosetecnisa Zuazo	122	25	4.88

== See also ==
- Liga ASOBAL 2017–18
