= 2014–15 División de Honor Femenina de Balonmano =

Spanish women's handball season

División de Honor
- Season: 2014–15
- Champions: Bera Bera
- Relegated: Córdoba & Castelldefels
- EHF Cup: Bera Bera
- EHF Cup Winners' Cup: Mecalia Atl. Guardés
- EHF Challenge Cup: Rocasa G.C. ACE
- Matches played: 182
- Goals scored: 9,778 (53.73 per match)
- Top goalscorer: Raquel Caño, 191
- Biggest home win: Rocasa G.C. ACE 39–20 Adesal Córdoba
- Biggest away win: Clínicas Rincón Málaga Costa del Sol 17–36 Bera Bera
- Highest scoring: Aula Cultural 47–31 Prosetecnisa Zuazo

The División de Honor Femenina 2014–15 was the 58th season of women's handball top flight in Spain since its establishment. Bera Bera, retained the Championship title for a third successive season. The season began on 12 September, 2014 and the last matchday was played on 30 May, 2015. A total of 14 teams took part the league, 12 of which had already contested in the 2013–14 season, and two of which were promoted from the División de Plata 2013–14.

Bera Bera won its third title in a row. Bera Bera won the championship by a three-points margin over 2nd team in the standings, Rocasa G.C. ACE. Further, regarding to European competitions for 2014–15 season; Bera Bera qualified to EHF Cup, Rocasa ACE G.C. qualified to EHF Challenge Cup and Mecalia Atlético Guardés to EHF Cup Winners' Cup.

== Promotion and relegation ==
Teams promoted from 2013–14 División de Plata

- KH-7 Granollers
- Clínicas Rincón Málaga Costa del Sol

Teams relegated to 2015–16 División de Plata

- Vivelafruta.com Castelldefels
- Adesal Córdoba

== Teams ==
2014–15 División de Honor teams
Canary Islands

Team	City	Stadium	Capacity
Bera Bera	San Sebastián	Bidebieta	1,000
Rocasa G.C. ACE	Telde	Antonio Moreno	800
Helvetia Alcobendas	Alcobendas	Los Sueños	1,000
Mecalia Atl. Guardés	A Guarda	A Sangriña	1,500
Porriño	O Porriño	Polideportivo Municipal	1,600
Elche Mustang	Elche	Poliesportiu de Carrús	800
Aula Cultural	Valladolid	Huerta del Rey	3,500
Prosetecnisa Zuazo	Barakaldo	Lasesarre	2,576
Canyamelar Valencia	Valencia	El Cabanyal	1,200
Carobels Cleba	León	Palacio de los Deportes	6,500
Vivelafruta.com Castelldefels	Castelldefels	Can Vinader	800
Adesal Córdoba	Córdoba	La Fuensanta	600
KH-7 Granollers	Granollers	Palau d'Esports	5,685
Clínicas Rincón Málaga Costa del Sol	Málaga	Carranque	1,500

== Final standings ==
Pos	Team	Pld	W	D	L	GF	GA	GD	Pts	Qualification or relegation
1	Bera Bera	26	23	2	1	749	544	+205	48	Champions and Qualified to EHF Cup
2	Rocasa G.C. ACE	26	22	1	3	821	612	+209	45	Qualified to EHF Challenge Cup
3	Mecalia Atl. Guardés	26	20	2	4	742	604	+138	42	Qualified to EHF Cup Winners' Cup
4	Helvetia Alcobendas	26	18	1	7	737	656	+81	37	
5	Elche Mustang	26	17	0	9	690	647	+43	34	
6	Aula Cultural	26	15	1	10	792	751	+41	31	
7	Porriño	26	10	2	14	706	715	−9	22	
8	Prosetecnisa Zuazo	26	10	1	15	735	785	−50	21	
9	Canyamelar Valencia	26	9	3	14	671	699	−28	21	
10	Clínicas Rincón Málaga Costa del Sol	26	10	0	16	666	766	−100	20	
11	Carobels Cleba	26	6	3	17	654	725	−71	15	
12	KH-7 Granollers	26	7	1	18	626	753	−127	15	
13	Vivelafruta.com Castelldefels	26	3	1	22	620	775	−155	7	Relegation to Primera División
14	Adesal Córdoba	26	3	0	23	569	746	−177	6	Relegation to Primera División

Updated to match(es) played on 17 May 2015. Source: División de Plata^{[usurped]} and rfebm.net^{[usurped]}
Rules for classification: 1) points; 2) head-to-head points; 3) head-to-head goal difference; 4) goal difference; 5) number of goals scored

2014–15 División de Honor Femenina winners
(Basque Country (autonomous community))
Bera Bera
Third title

== Top goalscorers ==
Rank	Name	Team	Goals	GP	GPG
1	(Spain) Raquel Caño	Cleba León	191	25	7.64
2	(Spain) Alicia Fernández	Aula Cultural	169	26	6.5
3	(Spain) Patricia Alonso	Canyamelar Valencia	157	22	7.14
4	(Spain) Davinia López	Rocasa G.C. ACE	152	26	5.85
4	(Spain) Ainhoa Hernández	Prosetecnisa Zuazo	152	26	5.85
6	(Spain) Jennifer Gutiérrez	Clínicas Rincón Málaga Costa del Sol	148	25	5.92
7	(Spain) Amaia González	Aula Cultural	143	26	5.5
8	(Spain) Elisabeth Pinedo	Bera Bera	137	22	6.23
9	(Spain) Sara Gil	Vivelafruta.com Castelldefels	136	25	5.44
10	(Spain) Carlota Rubio	Adesal Córdoba	131	26	5.04

== See also ==
- Liga ASOBAL 2014–15
