= Susana Pareja =

Spanish handball player (born 1973)

Personal information
- Full name: Susana Pareja Ibarra
- Nationality: Spanish
- Born: 13 March 1973 (age 53) Sedaví, Valencia, Spain

Sport
- Sport: Handball
- Position: Right wing

Senior clubs
- Years: Team
- -1997: Mar Valencia
- 1997-2001: Osito l'Eliana
- 2001-2004: Ferrobús Mislata
- 2004-2008: Cementos Unión de Riba-roja
National team
Years	Team	Apps	(Gls)
1994-2005	Spain	143	(211)

Teams managed
- 2008–2011: BM Castellón
- 2011–2012: BM Sagunto
- 2013–2015: CH Canyamelar
- 2017–: Spain B
- 2018–2019: CH Canyamelar
- 2019–: BM Mislata
Medal record
Mediterranean Games
Gold medal – first place	2005 Almería	Team

Susana Pareja Ibarra (born 13 March 1973) is a Spanish former handball player and current coach.

She was born in Sedaví, Valencia, Spain. She competed at the 2004 Summer Olympics, where Spain finished 6th.
