= Anna Manaut =

Spanish handball player (born 1990)

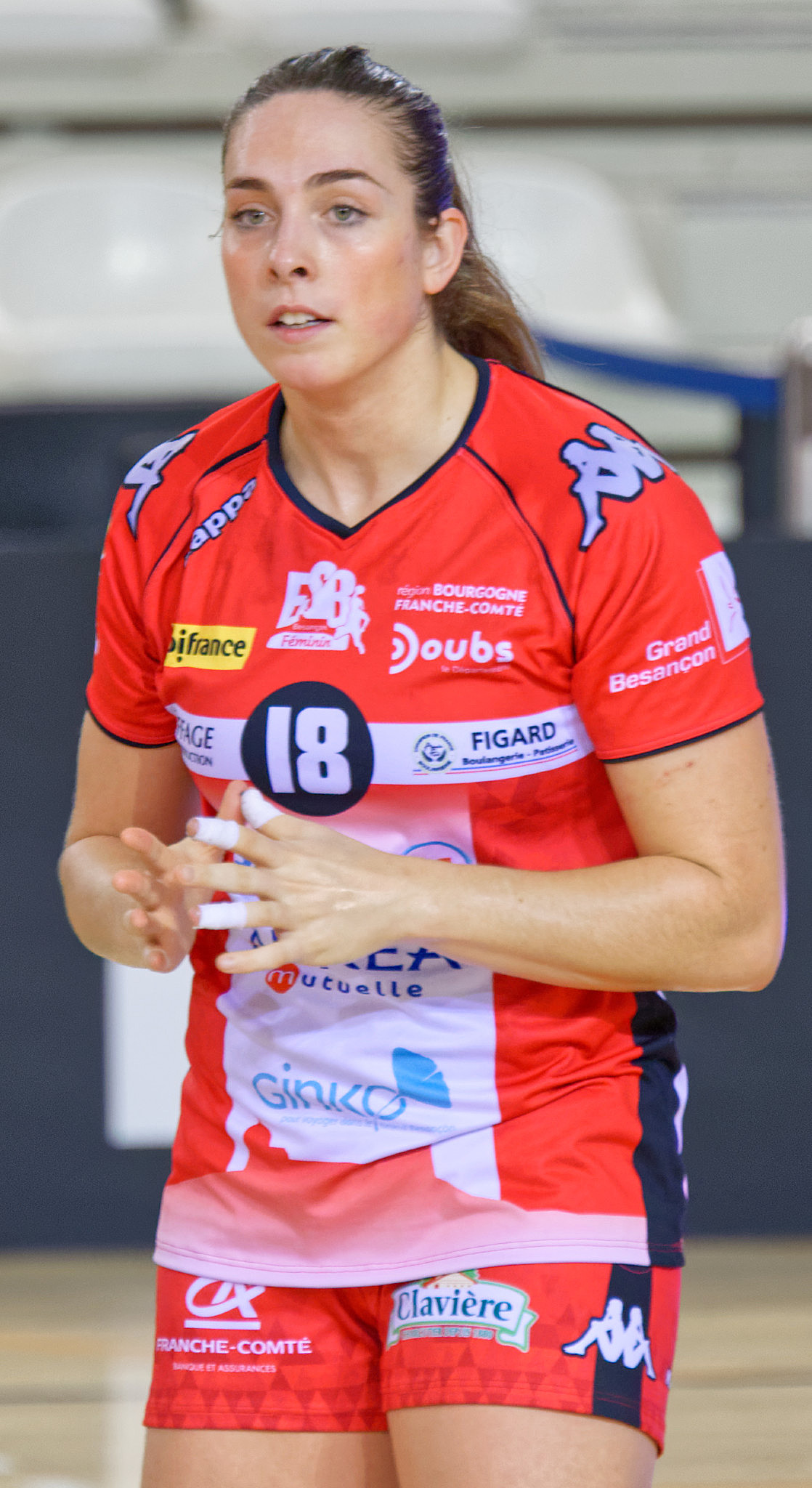

Personal information
- Full name: Anna Manaut Caixal
- Nationality: Spanish
- Born: 17 December 1990 (age 35) Tarroja de Segarra, Catalonia
- Height: 1.87 m (6 ft 1 1/2 in)

Sport
- Sport: Handball
- Position: Right Back
- Current club: AS Cannes Handball
- Number: 5

Senior clubs
- Years: Team
- –2011: Associació Lleidatana
- 2011–2012: CB Mar Alicante
- 2012–2015: CH Esportiu Castelldefels
- 2015–2016: CB Atlético Guardés
- 2016–2018: ESBF Besançon
- 2018–: AS Cannes Handball
National team
Years	Team	Apps	(Gls)
2009–	Spain	5	(0)

Anna Manaut Caixal (born 17 December 1990) is a Spanish handball player for AS Cannes Handball and the Spanish national team.

In 2016 she left the Spanish league to sign for the French team ESBF Besançon.

== Achievements ==
- Youth European Championship:
  - Finalist: 2007
