= Maria Sanchez =

Maria Sanchez or Maria Sánchez may refer to:

- Maria Sanchez (tennis) (born 1989) is an American tennis player.
- María del Rosario Sánchez Guerrero (born 1973), Mexican racewalker, a/k/a Rosario Sánchez
- María Sánchez Lorenzo (born 1977), Spanish tennis player
- María José Martínez Sánchez (born 1982), Spanish tennis player
- María Pilar Sánchez Alayeto (born 1984), Spanish tennis and paddle player
- María Elena Sánchez González (born 1994), Spanish water polo player, a/k/a Elena Sánchez
- María Andrea Sánchez (born 1994), Mexican footballer who plays defense
- María Eugenia Sánchez (born 1969), Spanish handball player
- María Trinidad Sánchez (1794–1845), Dominican freedom fighter
- María Sánchez (footballer) (born 1996), Mexican footballer born in the United States, who plays forward
- María Fernanda Sánchez
- María Sánchez (diver) (born 2005), Mexican bronze medalist

== See also ==
- María Guadalupe Sánchez (disambiguation), several people
