= Maddi Aalla =

Spanish handball player (born 1997)

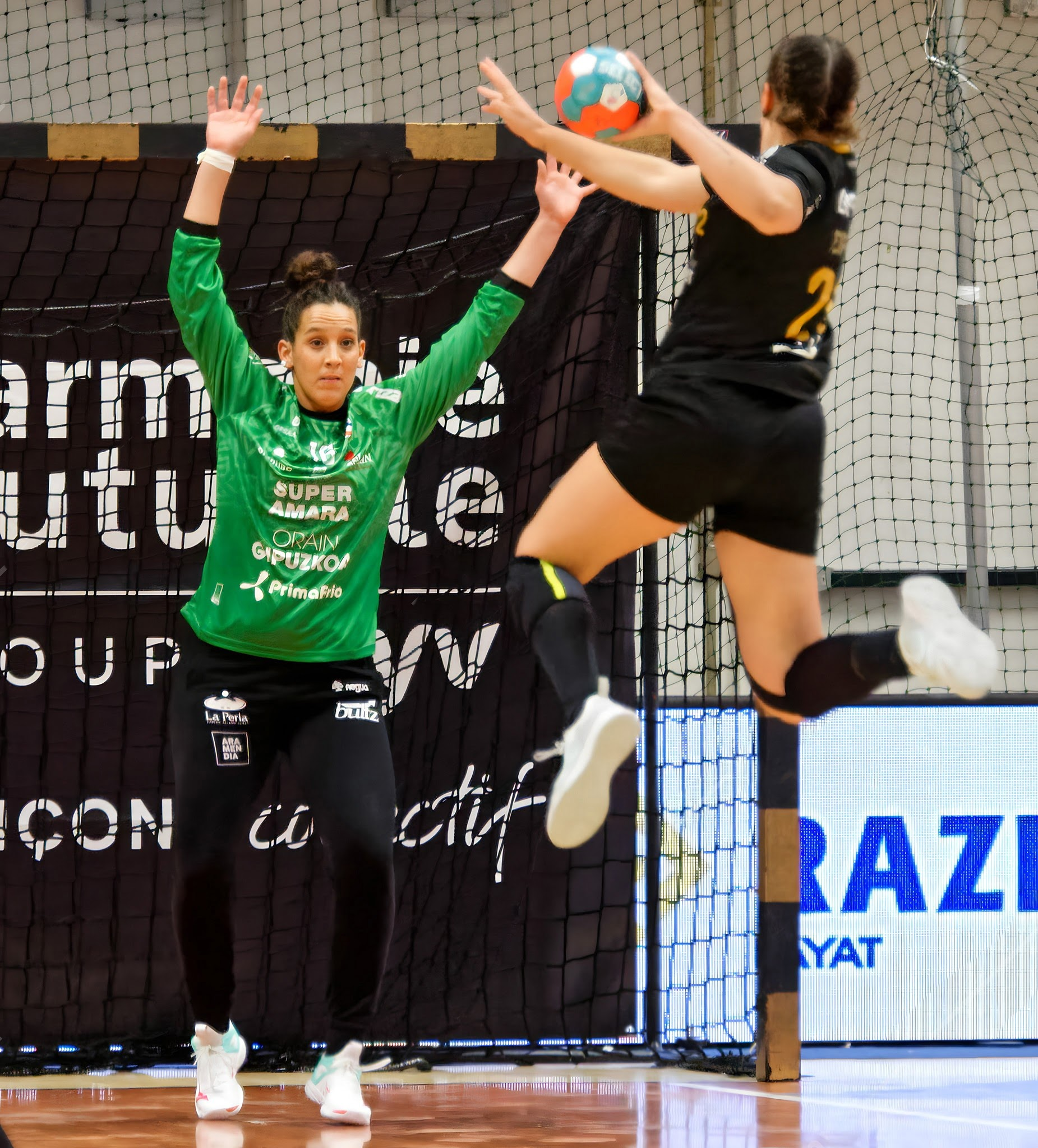
- Maddi Aalla Rotaetxe (2021)

Personal information
- Full name: Maddi Aalla Rotaetxe
- Born: 1 January 1997 (age 29) Plentzia, Spain
- Height: 1.74 m (5 ft 9 in)

Sport
- Sport: Handball
- Position: Goalkeeper
- Current club: Alba Fehérvár KC
- Number: 16

Senior clubs
- Years: Team
- 2014–2021: BM Zuazo
- 2021–2024: BM Bera Bera
- 2024–: Alba Fehérvár KC
National team
Years	Team	Apps	(Gls)
2022–	Spain	17	(0)
Medal record
Mediterranean Games
Gold medal – first place	2022 Oran	Team

Maddi Aalla Rotaetxe (born 1 January 1997) is a Spanish female handballer for Hungarian club Alba Fehérvár KC and the Spanish national team.

Aalla made her official debut on the Spanish national team on 30 June 2022, against Algeria. She also represented Spain at the 2022 European Women's Handball Championship in Slovenia, Montenegro and North Macedonia.

== Honours ==
=== Club ===
- División de Honor Femenina de Balonmano:
  - Winner: 2022
- Supercopa de España de Balonmano Femenino:
  - Winner: 2022

=== National team ===
- Mediterranean Games:
  - Gold Medalist: 2022
