= África Sempere =

Spanish handball player (born 1992)

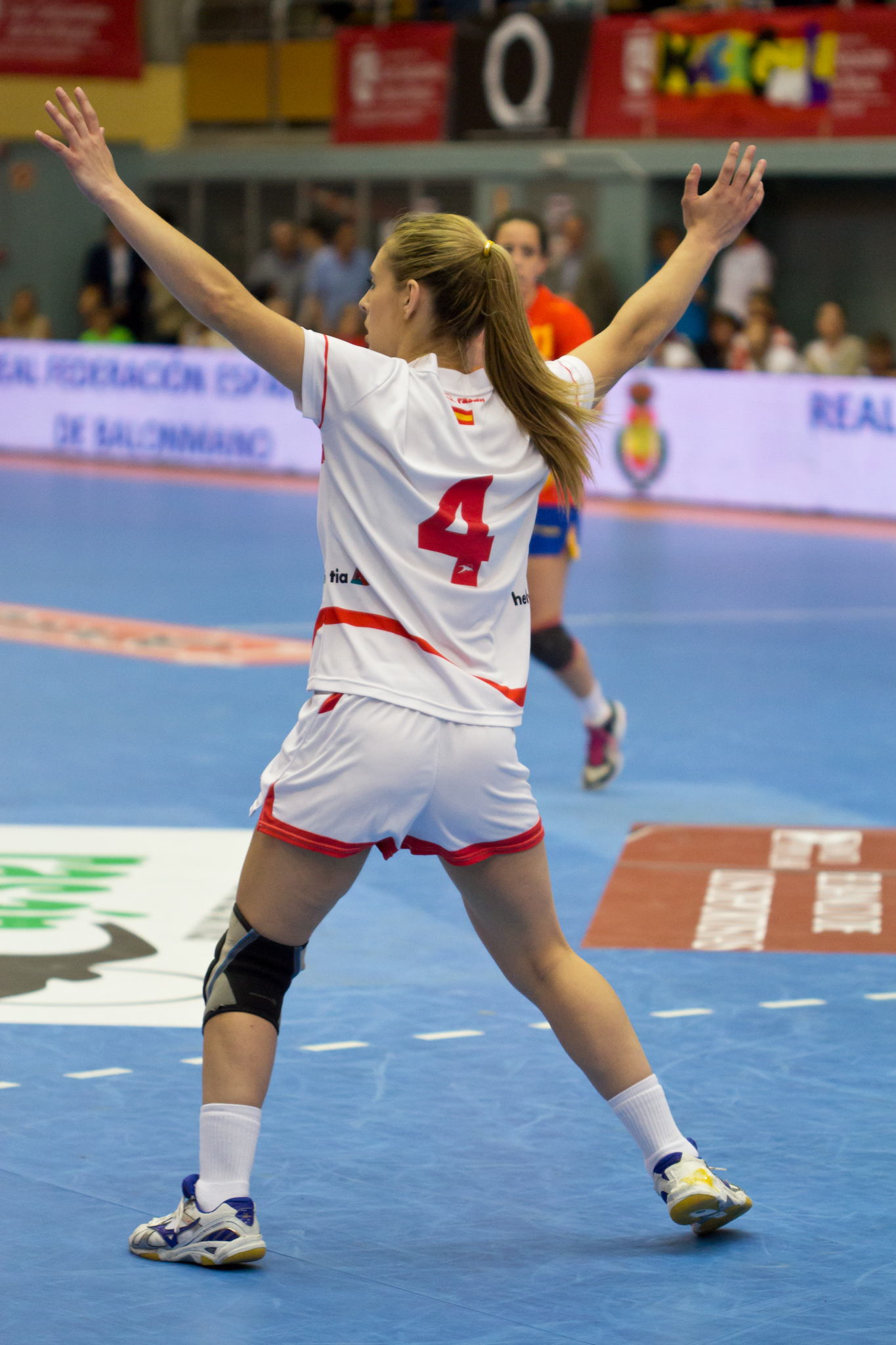

Personal information
- Full name: África Sempere Herrera
- Nationality: Spanish
- Born: 25 September 1992 (age 34) Torrellano, Elche, Spain
- Height: 1.68 m (5 ft 6 in)

Sport
- Sport: Handball
- Position: Line Player
- Current club: CB Atlético Guardés
- Number: 4

Senior clubs
- Years: Team
- 2013–2014: CB Elche
- 2014–2016: Fredrikstad BK
- 2016–: CB Atlético Guardés
National team
Years	Team	Apps	(Gls)
2017–	Spain	2	(3)

África Sempere Herrera (born 25 September 1992) is a Spanish handballer for CB Atlético Guardés and the Spanish national team.

When she was a little girl, she overcame a leukemia.

== Achievements ==
=== Spanish national team ===
- Women's World University Handball Championship:
  - Winner: 2016

=== Atlético Guardés ===
- Spanish División de Honor Femenina:
  - Winner: 2016/17
