= Judith Vizuete =

Spanish handball player (born 1995)

Personal information
- Full name: Judith Vizuete Recuenco
- Nationality: Spanish
- Born: 20 July 1995 (age 31)
- Height: 1.71 m (5 ft 7 in)

Sport
- Sport: Handball
- Position: Centre back
- Current club: CS Dacia Mioveni 2012

Senior clubs
- Years: Team
- 2014–2019: BM Granollers
- 2019–2020: CB Salud
- 2020–2021: Universitatea Cluj-Napoca
- 2021-: CS Dacia Mioveni 2012
National team
- Years: Team
- –: Catalonia
- –: Spain B

Judith Vizuete Recuenco (born 20 July 1995) is a Spanish female handballer who plays a centre back for Romanian handball club Mioveni.

== Individual awards ==
- División de Honor Top Scorer: 2019, 2020
