= BM La Calzada =

Spanish handball club

Motive.co Gijón
- Full name: Club Balonmano La Calzada
- Founded: October 18, 1995; 30 years ago
- Arena: La Arena, Gijón, Asturias, Spain
- Capacity: 1,200
- President: Manuela Fernández
- Head coach: Guillermo Algorri
- League: División de Honor
- 2022-23: 8th
Home	Away

Club Balonmano La Calzada, also known as Motive.co Gijón for sponsorship reasons, is a women's handball team based in Gijón, Asturias which currently plays in División de Honor Femenina de Balonmano, the top tier in the Spanish league system.

== History ==
BM La Calzada was founded on 18 October 1995 after the merge of local teams Club Balonmano Riscar and Asociación Deportiva Balonmano La Calzada.

In 2016, the club promoted for the first time to División de Honor and in 2018, the club won its first Copa de la Reina.

== Season by season ==
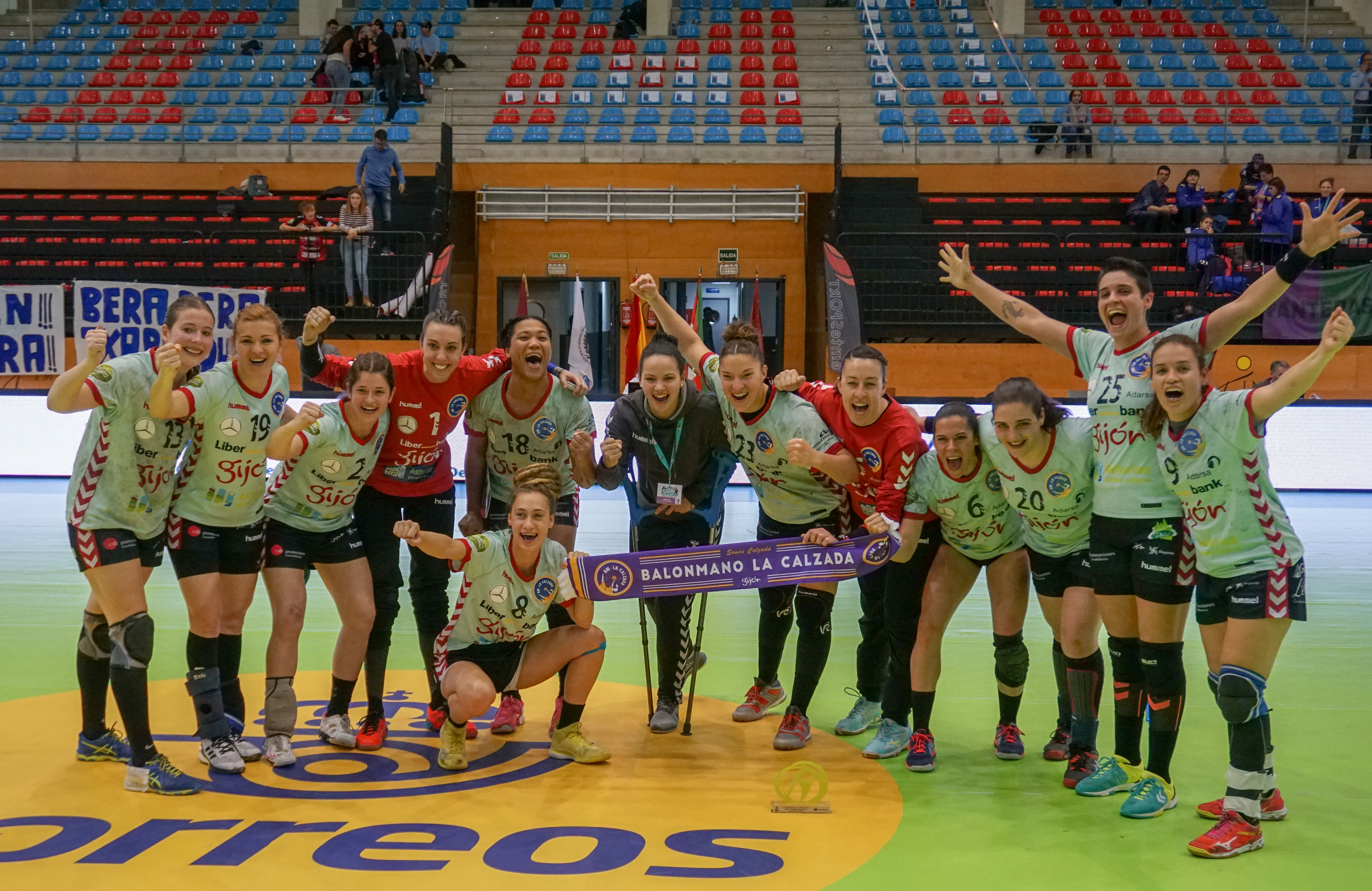
The team, during the 2019 Copa de la Reina.

Season	Tier	Division	Pos.	Copa de la Reina
2015–16	2	Div. Plata	1st	
2016–17	1	Div. Honor	11th	Second round
2017–18	1	Div. Honor	4th	Champion
2018–19	1	Div. Honor	5th	Semifinalist
2019–20	1	Div. Honor	4th	Suspended

== Trophies ==
- Copa de la Reina: (1)
  - 2017–18

== Current squad ==
Squad for the 2023–24 season

Goalkeepers

- 1 (Spain) Raquel Álvarez Lafuente
- (Spain) Aida Fernández

Wingers
RW

- 8 (Spain) Paula Valdivia Monserrat

LW

- 10 (Spain) María González Martínez
- 20 (Spain) Lucía Laguna Aranda

Line players

- 47 (Spain) Nayla de Andrés Castillo

Back players
LB

- 23 (Montenegro) Mina Novović
- 25 (Spain) Lucia Fernandez Nieto
- 17 (Spain) Lisa Chiagozie

CB

- (Portugal) Carol Silva
- 19 (Spain) Marta Da Silva Fernández
- 66 (Hungary) Dorottya Zentai

RB

- 6 (Spain) Lorena Zarco
- (Spain) Rocío Rojas

== Notable players ==
- (Argentina) Rocío Campigli
- (Paraguay) Fernanda Insfrán
