= Laura Hernández (handballer) =

Spanish handball player (born 1997)

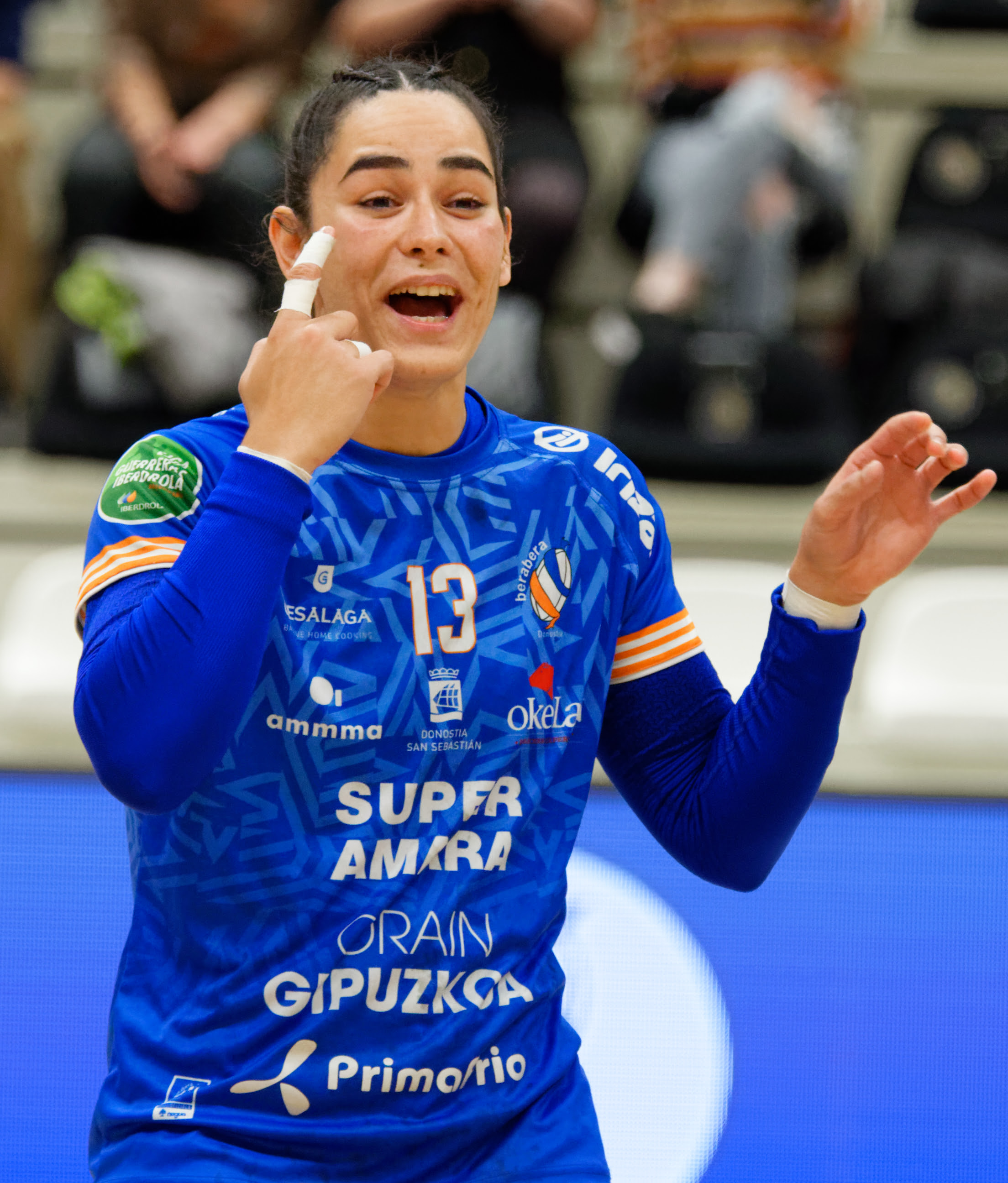
- Laura Hernández (2021)

Personal information
- Nationality: Spanish
- Born: 13 May 1997 (age 29) Elche, Spain
- Height: 1.70 m (5 ft 7 in)

Sport
- Sport: Handball
- Position: Left wing, Left back
- Current club: BM Bera Bera
- Number: 13

Senior clubs
- Years: Team
- 2013–2020: CB Elche
- 2020–: BM Bera Bera
National team
Years	Team	Apps	(Gls)
2017–	Spain	7	(7)
Medal record
Mediterranean Games
Gold medal – first place	2022 Oran	Team

Laura Hernández Selva (born 13 May 1997) is a Spanish handball player who plays for BM Bera Bera and the Spanish national team.

== Club career ==
Hernández began her career with the handball club CB Elche. In May 2020, she moved to BM Bera Bera, winning the División de Honor title with the club in 2021. She also played in European club competitions, such as the EHF Cup.

== International career ==
Hernández made her first appearance for the Spanish national team on 17 March 2017. She was named to the squad for the 2021 World Women's Handball Championship in Spain.
