= Raquel Caño =

Spanish female handballer (born 1984)

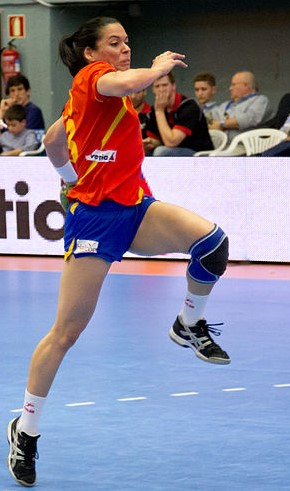

Personal information
- Full name: Raquel caño domingez
- Nationality: Spanish
- Born: 17 February 1984 (age 42) León, Spain
- Height: 1.64 m (5 ft 5 in)

Sport
- Sport: Handball
- Position: Left Wing
- Current club: BM La Calzada
- Number: 6

Senior clubs
- Years: Team
- 2002–2017: Cleba León
- 2017–: BM La Calzada
National team
Years	Team	Apps	(Gls)
2013–2013	Spain	15	(10)
2014–2017	Spain (beach)	50	(300)
Medal record
Beach Handball World Championships
Gold medal – first place	2016 Budapest	Team

Raquel Caño Domínguez (born 17 February 1984) is a Spanish female handballer for BM La Calzada and the Spanish national team.

She also competed in beach handball.

== Achievements ==
- Beach Handball World Cup:
  - Winner: 2016
- Spanish Queen's Cup:
  - Winner: 2018
