= BM Aula Cultural =

Spanish handball club

Aula Cultural
- Short name: Balonmano Aula Cultural
- Founded: 1986
- Arena: Polideportivo Huerta del Rey, Valladolid
- Capacity: 3,502
- President: Cayetano Cifuentes
- Head coach: Miguel Ángel Peñas (ESP)
- League: División de Honor
- 2018–19: División de Honor, 8th

Club Deportivo Balonmano Aula Cultural, also known as Aula Alimentos de Valladolid, is a Spanish women's handball club from Valladolid in División de Honor since 2013.

== Season to season ==
Season	Tier	Division	Pos.	Notes
2013–14	1	División de Honor	7th	
2014–15	1	División de Honor	6th	
2015–16	1	División de Honor	7th	
2016–17	1	División de Honor	6th	
2017–18	1	División de Honor	5th	
2018–19	1	División de Honor	8th	

== Team ==
=== Current squad ===
Squad for the 2025-2026 season

Goalkeepers

- 12 (Spain) Carmen Sanz Ledo
- 84 (Argentina) Marisol Carratú

Wingers
RW

- 8 (Spain) Inoa Lucio
- 9 (Spain) Maria Guerra

LW

- 7 (Spain) Mónica Gutiérrez Paris
- 77 (Spain) Amaia González de Garibay

Line players

- 15 (Spain) Jimena Arriaga
- 16 (Spain) Kadidiatou Jallow Diallo
- 17 (Spain) Aitana Hernandez

Back players
LB

- 11 (Spain) Carmen Fidalgo
- 18 (Spain) Ariadna Pastor
- 19 (Spain) Naroa Baquedano

CB

- 2 (Spain) Nerea Patiño
- 39 (Spain) Sandra Monteagudo

RB

- 66 (Chile) Valeska Lovera
- 79 (Spain) Maria Garcia

=== Transfers ===
Transfers for the 2026-2027

Joining

Leaving

- (Uruguay) Savina Bergara (PV) (to (Spain) CB Elche)

== Notable players ==
- (Spain) Silvia Arderíus
- (Spain) Elisabet Cesáreo
- (Spain) Alicia Fernández
- (Spain) Amaia González de Garibay
