= 2015–16 División de Honor Femenina de Balonmano =

Spanish women's handball season

División de Honor
- Season: 2015–16
- Champions: Bera Bera
- Relegated: Oviedo & Zarautz
- EHF Champions League: Bera Bera
- EHF Cup: There is no representation when resigning the Rocasa G.C. ACE
- EHF Challenge Cup: Rocasa G.C. ACE, Prosetecnisa Zuazo, Mecalia Atlético Guardés, Helvetia Alcobendas

The División de Honor Femenina 2015–16, or Liga Loterías 2015-16 after sponsorship of Loterías y Apuestas del Estado, was the 59th season of women's handball top flight in Spain since its establishment. Bera Bera, retained the Championship title for a fourth successive season. The season began on 5 September, 2015 and the last matchday was played on 28 May, 2016. A total of 14 teams took part the league, 12 of which had already contested in the 2014–15 season, and two of which were promoted from the División de Plata 2014–15.

Bera Bera won its fourth title in a row. It won the championship with the same points as the 2nd team in the standings, Rocasa G.C. ACE. Further, regarding to European competitions for 2015–16 season; Bera Bera qualified to EHF Champions League, and Rocasa ACE G.C, Prosetecnisa Zuazo, Mecalia Atlético Guardés and Helvetia Alcobendas qualified to EHF Challenge Cup.

== Promotion and relegation ==
Teams promoted from 2014–15 División de Plata

- Jofemesa Oviedo
- Aiala Zarautz

Teams relegated to 2016–17 División de Plata

- Jofemesa Oviedo
- Aiala Zarautz

== Teams ==
2015–16 División de Honor teams
Canary Islands

Team	City	Stadium	Capacity
Bera Bera	San Sebastián	Bidebieta	1,000
Rocasa G.C. ACE	Telde	Antonio Moreno	800
Helvetia Alcobendas	Alcobendas	Los Sueños	1,000
Mecalia Atl. Guardés	A Guarda	A Sangriña	1,500
CB Porriño	O Porriño	Polideportivo Municipal	1,600
Elche Mustang	Elche	Poliesportiu de Carrús	800
Aula Cultural	Valladolid	Huerta del Rey	3,500
Prosetecnisa Zuazo	Barakaldo	Lasesarre	2,576
Canyamelar Valencia	Valencia	El Cabanyal	1,200
Carobels ULE CLEBA León	León	Palacio de los Deportes	6,500
Jofemesa Oviedo	Oviedo	Florida Arena	900
Aiala Zarautz	Zarautz	Aritzbatalde Udal Kiroldegia	
KH-7 Granollers	Granollers	Palau d'Esports	5,685
Clínicas Rincón Málaga	Málaga	Carranque	1,500

== Final standings ==
Pos	Team	Pld	W	D	L	GF	GA	GD	Pts	Qualification or relegation
1	Bera Bera	26	24	0	2	771	518	+253	48	Champions and Qualified to EHF Champions League
2	Rocasa G.C. ACE	26	24	0	2	754	590	+164	48	Qualified to EHF Challenge Cup
3	Mecalia Atl. Guardés	26	18	2	6	727	591	+136	38	Qualified to EHF Challenge Cup
4	Helvetia Alcobendas	26	16	0	10	655	617	+38	32	Qualified to EHF Challenge Cup
5	CB Porriño	26	15	0	11	696	680	+16	30	
6	Prosetecnisa Zuazo	26	12	4	10	696	675	+21	28	Qualified to EHF Challenge Cup
7	Aula Cultural	26	13	2	11	789	727	+62	28	
8	Canyamelar Valencia	26	9	3	14	656	685	−29	21	
9	Clínicas Rincón Málaga	26	9	3	14	689	708	−19	21	
10	Carobels ULE CLEBA León	26	9	1	16	677	815	−138	19	
11	Elche Mustang	26	8	2	16	612	696	−84	18	
12	KH-7 Granollers	26	9	0	17	655	713	−58	18	
13	Jofemesa Oviedo	26	4	1	21	582	726	−144	9	Relegation to División de Plata
14	Aiala Zarautz	26	3	0	23	568	786	−218	6	Relegation to División de Plata

Updated to match(es) played on unknown. Source: División de Honor and rfebm.net^{[usurped]}
Rules for classification: 1) points; 2) head-to-head points; 3) head-to-head goal difference; 4) goal difference; 5) number of goals scored

2015–16 División de Honor Femenina winners
(Basque Country (autonomous community))
Bera Bera
Fourth title

== See also ==
- Liga ASOBAL 2015–16
