= Paula Valdivia Monserrat =

Spanish handball player (born 1995)

Personal information
- Full name: Paula Maria Valdivia Monserrat
- Nationality: Spanish
- Born: 23 December 1995 (age 30) Algeciras, Spain
- Height: 1.68 m (5 ft 6 in)

Sport
- Sport: Handball
- Position: Right wing
- Current club: Prosetecnisa Zuazo
- Number: 15

Senior clubs
- Years: Team
- 2013–2014: Adesal Córdoba
- 2014–2017: CBF Málaga Costa del Sol
- 2017–2017: Adesal Córdoba
- 2017–?: Prosetecnisa Zuazo
- ?—2021: BM Remudas
- 2021–: Chambray
National team
| Years | Team | Apps | (Gls) |
| 2017– | Spain | 19 | (28) |
Medal record
Mediterranean Games
| Gold medal – first place | 2018 Tarragona | Team |
| Gold medal – first place | 2022 Oran | Team |

Paula Maria Valdivia Monserrat (born 23 December 1995) is a Spanish handball player for BM Remudas and the Spanish national team.

She participated at the 2018 European Women's Handball Championship.
