= Cristina Gómez =

Cristina Gómez may refer to:

- Cristina Gómez Arquer (born 1968), Spanish handball player
- Cristina Gómez (squash player) (born 1998), Spanish squash player
