= CH Canyamelar =

Spanish handball club

Club Handbol Canyamelar
- Short name: CH Canyamelar
- Founded: 2013
- Arena: Poliesportiu El Cabanyal, Valencia
- Capacity: 1,200
- President: Manuel Gómez
- Head coach: Susana Pareja
- League: Primera nacional
- Club colours

Club Handbol Canyamelar is a Spanish women's handball club from Valencia in División de Honor.

The club was created in June 2013 after the disappearance of the CE Handbol Marítim due to the great debts that it had. They played in the 2nd tier of Spanish handball from 2013 to 2019, where they were relegated to Primera nacional, in a season mared with debt.

== Season to season ==
Season	Tier	Division	Pos.	Notes
2013–14	1	División de Honor	9th	
2014–15	1	División de Honor	9th	
2015–16	1	División de Honor	8th	
2016–17	1	División de Honor	8th	
2017–18	1	División de Honor	12th	
2018–19	1	División de Honor	13th	Relegated
