= Montserrat Puche Díaz =

Spanish handball player (born 1970)

Montserrat Puche
Personal information
- Full name: Montserrat Puche Díaz
- Born: 22 May 1970 (age 56) Alcorcón, Spain
- Height: 171 cm (67 in)

Sport
- Sport: Handball

Senior clubs
- Years: Team
- 1996–1998: Milar L'Eliana
- 1998–1999: BM Elda Prestigio
- 1999–2007: BM Sagunto
- 2007–2008: BM Bera Bera
National team
Years	Team	Apps	(Gls)
1990–2004	Spain	196	(736)

Teams managed
- 2015–2018: BM Bera Bera
- 2018–: BM Castellón
Medal record
Women's handball
Representing Spain
Mediterranean Games
Silver medal – second place	2001 Tunis	Team competition

Montserrat "Montse" Puche Díaz (born 22 May 1970) is a former Spanish team handball player and current coach. She competed at the 1992 Summer Olympics in Barcelona, where the Spanish team placed seventh. She also competed at the 2004 Summer Olympics in Athens, where the Spanish team reached the quarter finals, and placed sixth in the tournament.
