= BM Porriño =

Spanish handball club

- Short name: Club Balonmano Porriño
- Founded: 1987
- Arena: Pavillón Municipal do Porriño, O Porriño
- Capacity: 2,000
- President: Abel Estévez
- Head coach: Abel Estévez (ESP)
- League: División de Honor
- 2018–19: División de Honor, 10th

Club Balonmano Porriño, also known as Godoy Maceira Porriño for sponsorship reasons, is a Spanish women's handball club from O Porriño, Pontevedra, in División de Honor since 2011.

== Season to season ==
Season	Tier	Division	Pos.	Notes
2011–12	1	División de Honor	10th	
2012–13	1	División de Honor	6th	
2013–14	1	División de Honor	5th	
2014–15	1	División de Honor	7th	
2015–16	1	División de Honor	5th	
2016–17	1	División de Honor	7th	
2017–18	1	División de Honor	9th	
2018–19	1	División de Honor	10th	

== Team ==
=== Current squad ===
Squad for the 2025–26 season

Goalkeepers

- 12 (Portugal) Isabela Ferrarin
- 37 (Spain) Raquel Blanco
- 39 (Spain) Andrea Sáez

Wingers
LW

- 95 (Spain) Lucia Laguna
- 20 (Spain) Adriana Rial

RW

- 13 (Portugal) Julia Figueira
- 25 (Spain) Ugazi Manterola

Line players

- 23 (Spain) Carmen Prelchi
- 7 (Spain) Alicia Campo
- 8 (Spain) Iria Benaches

Back players
LB

- 2 (Spain) Adriana Mallo
- 15 (Hungary) Viktoria Szembery
- 65 (Spain) Marina González

CB

- 17 (Portugal) Bruna Ribeiro Dias
- 31 (Argentina) Delfina Ojea

RB

- 19 (Spain) Aroa Fernández
- 30 (Spain) María Rodriguez
- 00 (France) Kimberley Lisa Melissa Rutil

== Notable players ==
- (Spain) Alicia Fernández
- (Spain) Sara Gil de la Vega
