= 1986–87 División de Honor Femenina de Balonmano =

The 1986–87 División de Honor Femenina de Balonmano was the 30th edition of the premier Spanish women's handball championship, running from 15 September 1986 to 29 March 1987. The competition returned to a regular system, instead of the previous season's three stages format.

Íber Valencia won its tenth title in a row, winning all 22 games. CB Onda and CB Leganés followed in European positions, qualifying for the Cup Winners' Cup and IHF Cup respectively.

== Standings ==
	Team	P	W	D	L	G+	G−	Pts	Comments
1	(Valencian Community) Íber	22	22	0	0	568	314	44	Qualified for the European Cup
2	(Valencian Community) Mades Seguros (Onda)	22	19	0	3	509	284	38	Qualified for the Cup Winners' Cup
3	(Community of Madrid) Leganés	22	17	0	5	429	307	34	Qualified for the IHF Cup
4	(Community of Madrid) Pegaso	22	13	1	8	389	355	27	
5	(Catalonia) Castelldefels	22	11	2	9	452	438	24	
6	(Basque Country (autonomous community)) Hernani	22	9	0	13	347	404	18	
7	(Aragon) Zaragoza	22	8	2	12	354	431	18	
8	(Andalusia) Puleva (Granada)	22	8	0	14	306	352	16	
9	(Catalonia) Molins de Rei	22	7	1	14	362	448	15	
10	(Canary Islands) Café Tirma (Gran Canaria)	22	6	1	15	339	413	13	
11	(Canary Islands) Elsafe (Arenales)	22	4	2	16	312	421	10	
12	(Basque Country (autonomous community)) Barakaldo	22	2	3	17	287	430	8	Relegated
