= BM Remudas =

Spanish handball club

Rocasa G.C. ACE
- Full name: Balonmano Remudas
- Short name: Remudas
- Founded: 1978
- Arena: Antonio Moreno, Telde
- Capacity: 800
- President: Antonio Moreno (ESP)
- Head coach: Iñaki Aniz (ESP)
- League: División de Honor
- 2022–23: División de Honor, 4th
| Home | Away |

Balonmano Remudas, a.k.a. Rocasa Gran Canaria ACE for sponsorship reasons, is a Spanish professional women's handball club from Telde in the island of Gran Canaria, Canary Islands.

Founded in 1978, ten years later it was promoted to the División de Honor, where it has played since. Its best result is the first place in 2019. Remudas won the EHF Challenge Cup in 2016 and 2019.

== Season to season ==
| Season | Tier | Division | Pos. | Notes |
|---|---|---|---|---|
| 1986–87 | 2 | Primera Nacional | 3rd (Group 6) | |
| 1987–88 | 2 | Primera Nacional | 1st (Group 6) | |
| 1988–89 | 2 | Primera Nacional | 1st (Group 4) | Promoted |
| 1989–90 | 1 | División de Honor | 8th | |
| 1990–91 | 1 | División de Honor | 5th | |
| 1991–92 | 1 | División de Honor | 3rd | |
| 1992–93 | 1 | División de Honor | 7th | |
| 1993–94 | 1 | División de Honor | 5th | |
| 1994–95 | 1 | División de Honor | 6th | |
| 1995–96 | 1 | División de Honor | 10th | |
| 1996–97 | 1 | División de Honor | 8th | |
| 1997–98 | 1 | División de Honor | 10th | |
| 1998–99 | 1 | División de Honor | 5th | |
| 1999–00 | 1 | División de Honor | 4th | |
| 2000–01 | 1 | División de Honor | 6th | |
| 2001–02 | 1 | División de Honor | 5th | |
| 2002–03 | 1 | División de Honor | 7th | |
| 2003–04 | 1 | División de Honor | 8th | |
| 2004–05 | 1 | División de Honor | 8th | |

| Season | Tier | Division | Pos. | Notes |
|---|---|---|---|---|
| 2005–06 | 1 | División de Honor | 12th | |
| 2006–07 | 1 | División de Honor | 8th | |
| 2007–08 | 1 | División de Honor | 8th | |
| 2008–09 | 1 | División de Honor | 11th | |
| 2009–10 | 1 | División de Honor | 11th | |
| 2010–11 | 1 | División de Honor | 12th | |
| 2011–12 | 1 | División de Honor | 7th | |
| 2012–13 | 1 | División de Honor | 3rd | |
| 2013–14 | 1 | División de Honor | 2nd | |
| 2014–15 | 1 | División de Honor | 2nd | |
| 2015–16 | 1 | División de Honor | 2nd | |
| 2016–17 | 1 | División de Honor | 3rd | |
| 2017–18 | 1 | División de Honor | 3rd | |
| 2018–19 | 1 | División de Honor | 1st | |
| 2019–20 | 1 | División de Honor | 8th | |
| 2020–21 | 1 | División de Honor | 3rd | |
| 2021–22 | 1 | División de Honor | 3rd | |

- 33 seasons in División de Honor

== Trophies ==
- EHF European Cup (EHF Challenge Cup) : 3
  - 2015–16
  - 2018–19
  - 2021–22
- División de Honor: 1
  - 2019
- Copa de la Reina: 2
  - 2015, 2017
- Supercopa de España: 2
  - 2017
  - 2019

== European record ==
| Season | Competition | Round | Club | 1st leg | 2nd leg | Aggregate |
|---|---|---|---|---|---|---|
| 2000–01 | EHF Cup Winners' Cup | R3 | (Israel) Petah Tikva | 42–14 | 43–11 | 85–25 |
| 2000–01 | EHF Cup Winners' Cup | R4 | (Romania) Zalău | 23–19 | 17–25 | 41–44 |
| 2002–03 | EHF Cup | R2 | (Belarus) Minsk | 30–29 | 32–24 | 62–53 |
| 2002–03 | EHF Cup | R3 | (Germany) Lützellinden | 17–17 | 23–17 | 40–34 |
| 2002–03 | EHF Cup | R4 | (Ukraine) Galychanka Lviv | 32–23 | 22–23 | 54–46 |
| 2002–03 | EHF Cup | 1/4 | (Ukraine) Motor Zaporizhzhia | 17–24 | 14–28 | 31–52 |
| 2013-14 | EHF Cup | R3 | (Belarus) Gomel | 30–20 | 26–26 | 56–46 |
| 2013-14 | EHF Cup | 1/8 | (Russia) Lada Togliatti | 28–30 | 16–26 | 44–56 |
| 2014-15 | EHF Cup | R3 | (Sweden) Lugi Lund | 28–24 | 25–23 | 53–47 |
| 2014-15 | EHF Cup | 1/8 | (Hungary) Érd | 22–30 | 23–31 | 45–61 |
| 2015-16; Winner | Challenge Cup | 1/8 | (Kosovo) Shqiponja | 23–38 | 31–56 | 94–54 |
| 2015-16; Winner | Challenge Cup | 1/4 | (Serbia) Aranđelovac | 35–25 | 27–19 | 62–44 |
| 2015-16; Winner | Challenge Cup | 1/2 | (Poland) Start Elbląg | 25–24 | 22–22 | 47–46 |
| 2015-16; Winner | Challenge Cup | Final | (Turkey) Kastamonu | 29–25 | 33–29 | 62–54 |
| 2016-17 | Challenge Cup | R3 | (Finland) HIFK | 39–12 | 32–21 | 71–33 |
| 2016-17 | Challenge Cup | 1/8 | (Slovenia) Ajdovščina | 31–18 | 36–21 | 67–39 |
| 2016-17 | Challenge Cup | 1/4 | (Croatia) Lokomotiva Zagreb | 24–29 | 26–23 | 50–52 |
| 2017–18 | Challenge Cup | R3 | (Netherlands) Maedilon | 32–18 | 32–26 | 64–44 |
| 2017–18 | Challenge Cup | 1/8 | (Sweden) Boden | 19–19 | 31–26 | 50–45 |
| 2017–18 | Challenge Cup | 1/4 | (Turkey) Zağnos | 37–25 | 25–20 | 62–45 |
| 2017–18 | Challenge Cup | 1/2 | (Croatia) Lokomotiva Zagreb | 25–25 | 26–26 | 51–51 |
| 2017–18 | Challenge Cup | Final | (Poland) Lublin | 22–22 | 23–27 | 45–49 |
| 2018–19; Winner | Challenge Cup | 1/8 | (Turkey) Yenimahalle | 33–23 | 24–22 | 57–45 |
| 2018–19; Winner | Challenge Cup | 1/4 | (Belarus) Gomel | 24–18 | 21–26 | 45–44 |
| 2018–19; Winner | Challenge Cup | 1/2 | (Sweden) Kristianstad | 22–17 | 31–20 | 53–37 |
| 2018–19; Winner | Challenge Cup | Final | (Poland) Pogoń Szczecin | 23–24 | 30–23 | 53–47 |
| 2019–20 | EHF Champions League | QF | (Czech Republic) Baník Most | 21–28 | | |
| 2019–20 | EHF Champions League | QF | (Serbia) Jagodina | 28–15 | | |
| 2019–20 | EHF Cup | R3 | (Romania) Măgura Cisnădie | 28–24 | 18–22 | 46–46 (a) |
| 2021–22; Winner | EHF European Cup | R2 | (Portugal) A.R.C. Alpendorada | 33–22 | 35–25 | 68–47 |
| 2021–22; Winner | EHF European Cup | R3 | (Sweden) Skara HF | 37–38 | 27–25 | 64–63 |
| 2021–22; Winner | EHF European Cup | L16 | (Turkey) İzmir Büyükşehir | 36–27 | 28–28 | 64–55 |
| 2021–22; Winner | EHF European Cup | QF | (Spain) Visitelche.com CB Elche | 23–17 | 22–22 | 45–39 |
| 2021–22; Winner | EHF European Cup | SF | (Ukraine) HC Galychanka | 34–27 | 19–20 | 53–47 |
| 2021–22; Winner | EHF European Cup | F | (Spain) CBF Málaga Costa del Sol | 21–17 | 25–29 | 46–46 (a) |
| 2022–23 | EHF European League | R2 | (Croatia) ŽRK Bjelovar | 42–19 | 37–22 | 79–41 |
| 2022–23 | EHF European League | R3 | (Norway) Sola HK | 29–32 | 28–34 | 57–66 |

== Team ==
=== Current squad ===
Squad for the 2026- 27 season

Goalkeepers

- 13 (Spain) Lulu Guerra (injured)
- 18 (Spain) Ana Belen Palomino
- 61 (Argentina) Candelaria Cuadrado

Wingers
RW

- 02 (Spain) Iria Ranz
- 30 (Chile) Michaella Bocchieri (injured)
- 10 (Spain) Uxue Morentin

LW

- 33 (Brazil) Fernanda Lima
- 32 (Spain) Yassira Martel

Line players

- 31 (Spain) María Zaldua
- 19 (Spain) Irene Botella

Back players
RB

- 06 (Spain) Almudena Rodriguez
- 44 (Spain) Eider Poles

CB

- 34 (Spain) Ana Medina
- 17 (Spain) Ithaisa Castillo
- 14 (Brazil) Maria de Oliveira Correia

LB

- 22 (Brazil) Francieli Söthe
- 82 (Spain) Alba Tort

== Notable players ==
- (Norway) Trine Haltvik
- (Denmark) Charlotte Højfeldt
- (Slovenia) Lina Krhlikar
- (Sweden) Anna Ljungdahl Rapp
- (Spain) Marta Mangué
- (Sweden) Åsa Mogensen
- (Spain) María Núñez
- (Spain) Silvia Navarro
- (Spain) Almudena Rodríguez
- (Spain) Sayna Mbengue
- (Dominican Republic) Yacaira Tejeda
- (Bosnia and Herzegovina) Slađana Topić
