= CB Atlético Guardés =

Spanish handball club

- Full name: Clube Balonmán Mecalia Atlético Guardés
- Founded: 1967
- Arena: Pabellón Municipal de A Sangriña
- Head coach: Cristina Cabeza
- League: División de Honor
- 2022–2023: 5th

Clube Balonmán Atlético Guardés, also known as Mecalia Atlético Guardés due to sponsorship reasons, is a professional handball club from A Guarda, in the province of Pontevedra, Spain. The club was founded in 1967 and plays actually in the División de Honor Femenina de Balonmano, the premier women's professional handball league in Spain.

== Season to season ==
Season	Tier	Division	Pos.	Notes
2012–13	1	División de Honor	5th	
2013–14	1	División de Honor	4th	
2014–15	1	División de Honor	3rd	
2015–16	1	División de Honor	3rd	
2016–17	1	División de Honor	1st	League champion
2017–18	1	División de Honor	2nd	
2018–19	1	División de Honor	3rd	

== History ==
The club was promoted in 2012 to the División de Honor. In 2013–2014, the club played in their first continental competition, the EHF Cup Winners' Cup. In their first three participations, they were knocked out in Round 3. In 2016–2017, they reached quarterfinals in the EHF Challenge Cup, where they were beaten by Swedish H 65 Höör.

In 2016–2017 won their first Spanish Championship.

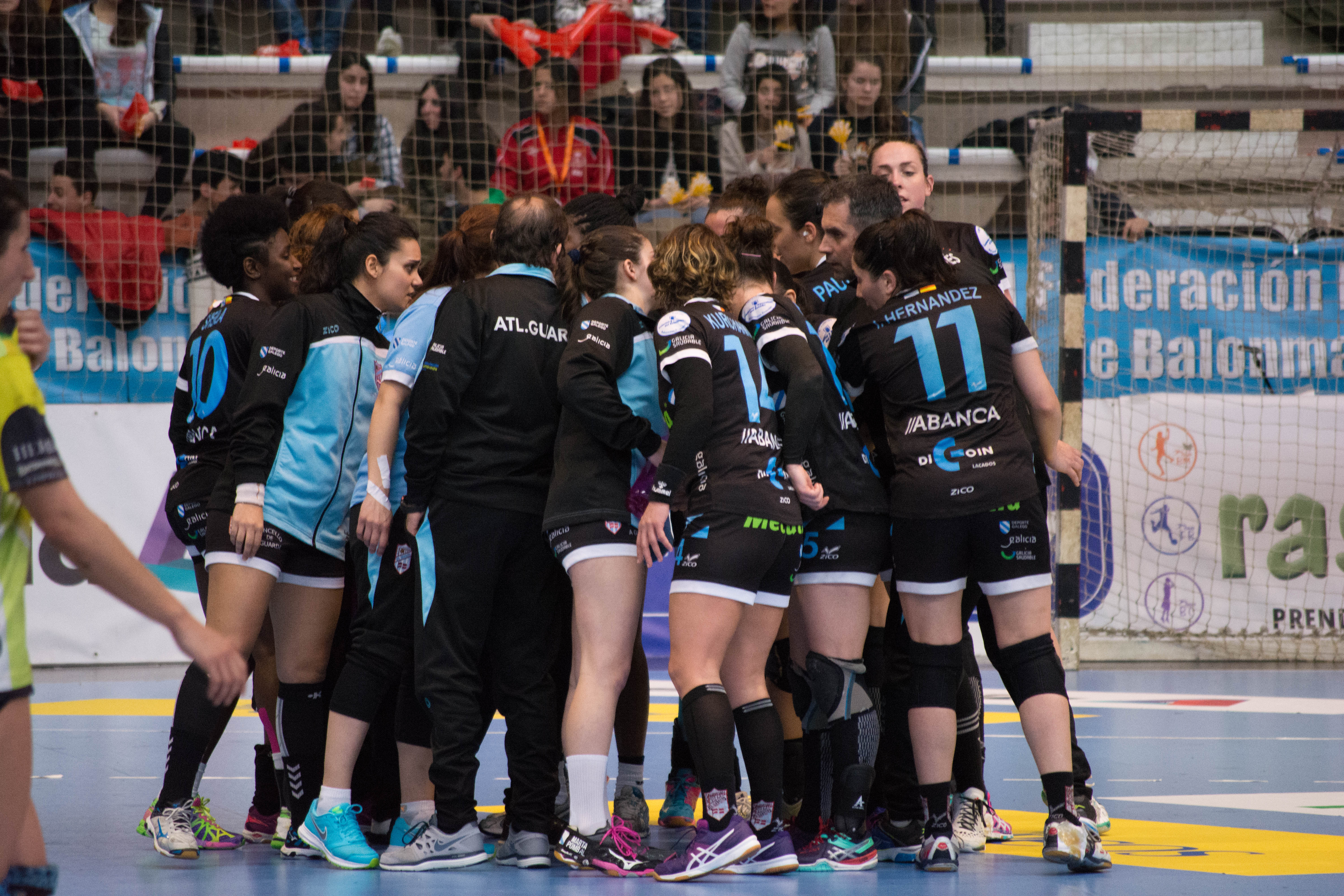
CB Atlético Guardés in the Copa de la Reina 2016

== Trophies ==
- División de Honor (1):
  - 2016–17
- EHF European Cup (1):
  - 2026
- Copa de la Reina:

Runner-up (1): 2022

== European record ==
Season	Competition	Round	Club	1st leg	2nd leg	Aggregate
2016–17	Challenge Cup	R3	(Ukraine) HC Dnepryanka Kherson	33–22	30–18	63–40
2016–17	Challenge Cup	1/8	(Portugal) Colégio de Gaia	30–26	32–22	62–48
2016–17	Challenge Cup	1/4	(Sweden) H 65 Höör	21–24	24–29	45–53

== Team ==
=== Current squad ===
Squad for the 2026–27 season

Goalkeepers

- 01 (Spain) Sabina Minguez
- 97 (Spain) Ana Marin

Wingers
LW

- 38 (Spain) Ania Ramos

RW

- 09 (Spain) Aintzane García
- 18 (Spain) Carme Castro

Line players

- 04 (Spain) África Sempere Herrera
- 13 (Spain) Maria Palomo
- 17 (Spain) Cristina Cifuentes Bermejo
- 93 (Spain) Noelia Solla

Back players
LB

- 07 (Slovenia) Blažka Hauptman
- 22 (Spain) Daniela García
- 29 (Spain) María Cobo

CB

- 11 (Spain) Cecilia Cacheda
- 14 (Spain) Rosane Serrano
- 06 (Spain) Silvia Leiras

RB

- 15 (Spain) Elena Martínez
- 23 (Spain) Nerea Gil

=== Transfers ===
Transfers for the 2026–2027

Joining

Leaving

- (France) Amandine Balzinc (GK) (to (Spain) BM Bera Bera)

== Notable players ==
- (Spain) Vanesa Amorós
- (Spain) Nuria Benzal
- (Argentina) Marisol Carratu
- (Spain) Paula García Ávila
- (Spain) Jennifer Gutiérrez
- (Spain) Anna Manaut
- (Spain) Carmen Martín
- (Argentina) Luciana Mendoza
- (Spain) Haridian Rodríguez
