= Noelia Oncina =

Spanish handball player (born 1976)

Personal information
- Full name: Noelia Oncina Moreno
- Nationality: Spanish
- Born: 9 November 1976 (age 49) Málaga, Spain
- Height: 1.66 m (5 ft 5 in)

Sport
- Sport: Handball
- Position: Left Wing

Senior clubs
- Years: Team
- 1994–1996: CBF Málaga Costa del Sol
- 1996–1997: Golosinas Fini Molina
- 1997–1998: BM Sierra Nevada
- 1998–2001: Vícar Goya Almería
- 2001–2004: El Osito L'Eliana
- 2004–2011: BM Sagunto
National team
Years	Team	Apps	(Gls)
1999–2009	Spain	174	(406)
Medal record
European Championship
Silver medal – second place	2008 Macedonia	Team
Mediterranean Games
Gold medal – first place	2005 Almería	Team
Silver medal – second place	2001 Tunis	Team

Noelia Oncina Moreno (born 9 November 1976) is a Spanish handball player. She played for the club Parc Sagunto, and was captain on the Spanish national team. She currently is one of the coaches of BM Morvedre senior team

She competed at the 2004 Summer Olympics in Athens, where the Spanish team reached the quarter finals, and finished 6th in the tournament.

She was captain for the Spanish team at the 2008 European Women's Handball Championship, where Spain reached the final, after defeating Germany in the semifinal. A year later she was part of the Spanish team that finished 4th at the 2009 World Women's Handball Championship.
