= Ivet Musons =

Spanish handball player (born 1992)

Personal information
- Full name: Ivet Musons Gimeno
- Nationality: Spanish
- Born: 17 June 1992 (age 34) Sant Quirze del Vallès, Spain
- Height: 1.67 m (5 ft 6 in)

Sport
- Sport: Handball
- Position: Left back
- Current club: CB Elche Mustang
- Number: 11

Senior clubs
- Years: Team
- 2012–2013: Esportiu Castelldefels
- 2013–: CB Elche Mustang
National team
Years	Team	Apps	(Gls)
2017–	Spain	23	(47)
Medal record
Mediterranean Games
Gold medal – first place	2018 Tarragona	Team

Ivet Musons Gimeno (born 17 June 1992) is a Spanish female handballer for CB Elche Mustang and the Spanish national team.
