= Alicia Fernández =

Spanish handball player (born 1992)

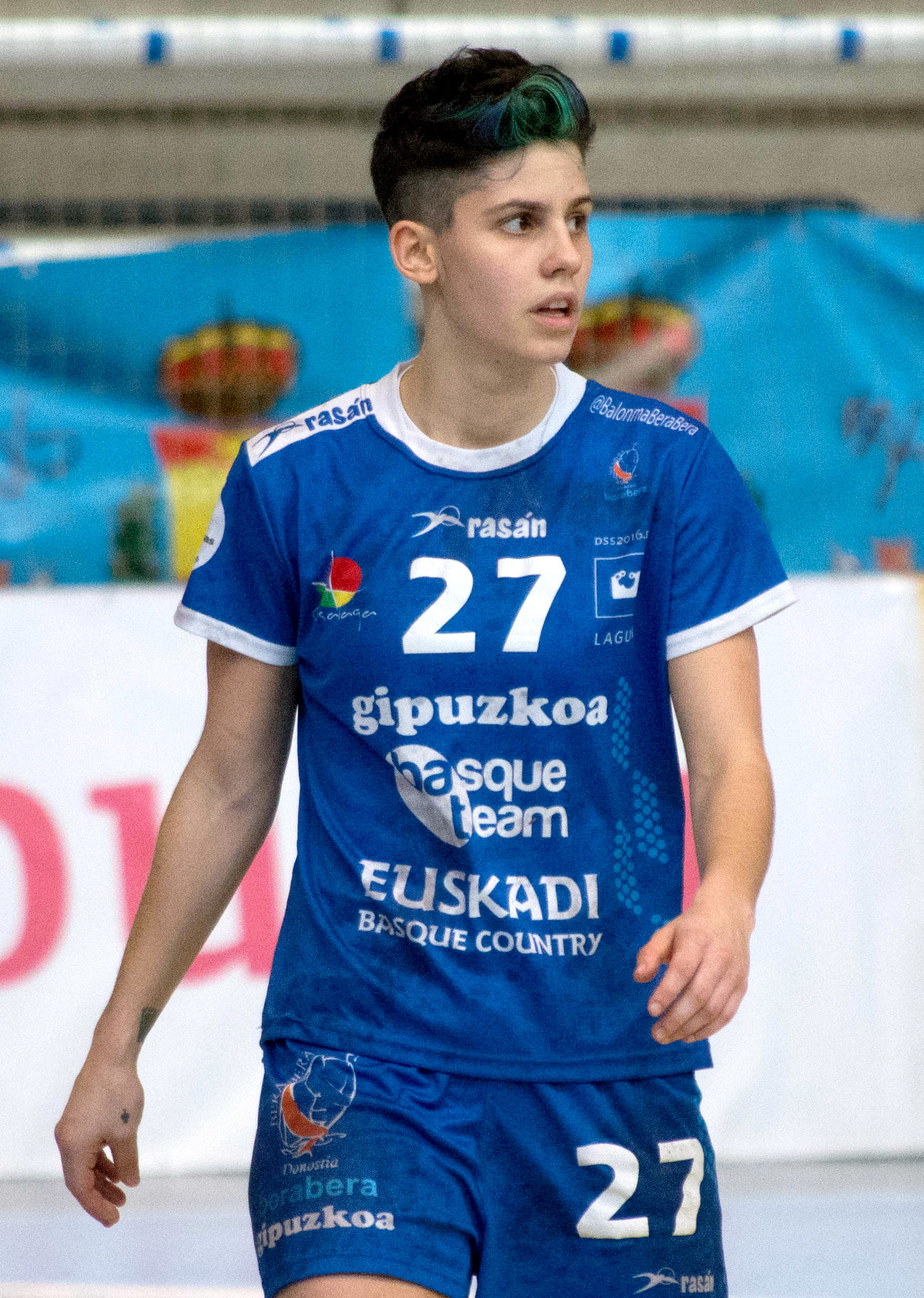

Personal information
- Full name: Alicia Fernández Fraga
- Nationality: Spanish
- Born: 21 December 1992 (age 33) Valdoviño, Spain
- Height: 1.72 m (5 ft 8 in)

Sport
- Sport: Handball
- Position: Centre back
- Current club: SCM Râmnicu Vâlcea
- Number: 27

Senior clubs
- Years: Team
- 2009–2012: BM Sagunto
- 2012–2014: BM Porriño
- 2014–2015: BM Aula Valladolid
- 2015–2017: Super Amara Bera Bera
- 2017–2021: SCM Râmnicu Vâlcea
- 2021–: CS Rapid București
National team
Years	Team	Apps	(Gls)
2018–	Spain	104	(231)
Medal record
World Championship
Silver medal – second place	2019 Japan
Mediterranean Games
Gold medal – first place	2018 Tarragona	Team
- Updated on 14 November 2024

Alicia Fernández Fraga (Note: In this Spanish name, the first or paternal surname is Fernández and the second or maternal family name is Fraga.) (born 21 December 1992) is a Spanish female handballer for SCM Râmnicu Vâlcea and the Spanish national team.

She competed at the 2020 Summer Olympics and the 2024 Summer Olympics.

== Honours ==
=== Club ===
- Spanish Division:
  - Winner: 2016
  - Silver Medalist: 2017
- Spanish Cup:
  - Winner: 2016
  - Silver Medalist: 2017
- Spanish League Cup:
  - Winner: 2016
  - Silver Medalist: 2017
- Romanian National League:
  - Winner: 2019
- Romanian Supercup:
  - Winner: 2018
- Romanian Cup:
  - Finalist: 2018, 2019
- Mediterranean Games:
  - Gold Medalist: 2018

=== Individual ===
- Liga Națională Foreign Player of the Year: 2019
