= BM Castellón =

Spanish handball club

- Full name: Club Deportivo Balonmano Castellón
- Founded: 1978
- Arena: Pavelló Fernando Úbeda Mir, Castellón de la Plana
- Capacity: 500
- President: Rafael Martí
- Head coach: Montserrat Puche
- League: División de Honor
- 2017–18: 13th

Club Deportivo Balonmano Castellón is a women's handball club from Castellón de la Plana in Spain. BM Castellón competes in the División de Honor, the top tier in the Spanish league system, since 2017.

== Season to season ==
| Season | Tier | Division | Pos. | Notes |
|---|---|---|---|---|
| 2016–17 | 2 | División de Plata | 1st / F | Promoted |
| 2017–18 | 1 | División de Honor | 13th | |
| 2018–19 | 1 | División de Honor | 14th | Relegated |
