= Slađana Topić =

Bosnian handball player (born 1983)

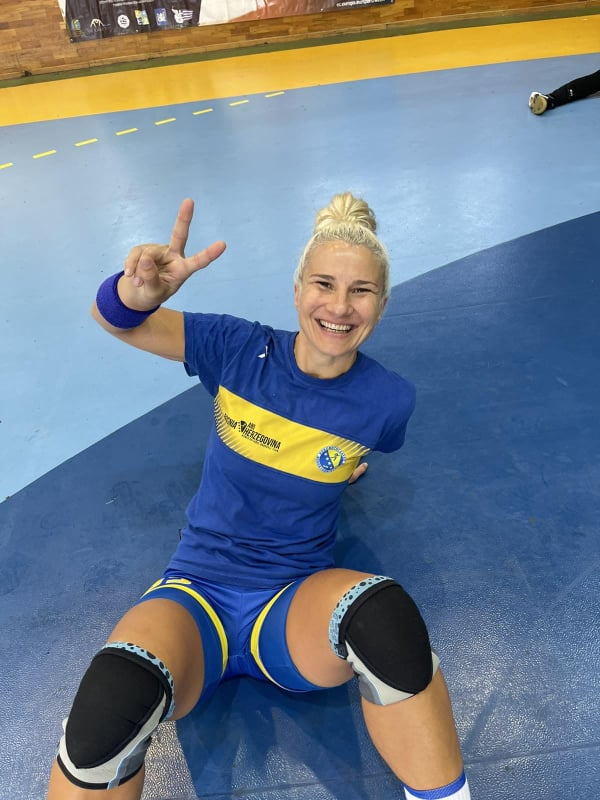
- Topic in 2021

Personal information
- Born: March 15, 1983 (age 43) Banja Luka, Yugoslavia
- Height: 177 cm (70 in)

Sport
- Sport: Handball
- Position: pivot

Senior clubs
- Years: Team
- 1998-2001 2002-2003: (Bosnia and Herzegovina) ŽRK Mira Prijedor
- 2001-2002: (Bosnia and Herzegovina) Mladost Banja Luka
- 2003-2004: (Bosnia and Herzegovina) RK Borac Banja Luka
- 2004-2005: (Bosnia and Herzegovina) ŽRK Krajina Cazin
- 2006: (Bosnia and Herzegovina) ŽRK Iskra Bugojno
- 2007-2008: (Serbia) ŽRK Naisa
- 2006-2007 2008: (Spain) Marina Park
- 2008-2010: (Spain) Handbol Amposta
- 2010-2011: (Spain) BM Remudas
- 2011-2019: (France) HBC Celles-sur-Belle
- 2020-2021: (France) BS Montluçon HB
- 2020-2021: (Spain) CB Lanzarote Puerto del Carmen
- 2021-2022: (Portugal) Madeira Andebol SAD
- 2022-2024: (Guadeloupe) Zayen LA HBF
National team
- Years: Team
- 2021-2024: Bosnia and Herzegovina

Slađana Topić (also written Sladjana Topic; Serbian Cyrillic: Слађана Топић; born 15 March 1983) is a Bosnian handball player who plays as pivot. She played professionally for clubs in Bosnia, France, Portugal, Serbia and Spain, played for the Bosnia and Herzegovina national team from 2021 and retired in 2024.

== Biography ==
Topic was born on 15 March 1983 in Banja Luka, at the time in Yugoslavia.

Topic captained HBC Celles-sur-Belle in France for nine seasons from 2011, leaving the team in 2019. She moved to CB Lanzarote Puerto del Carmen in Lanzarote, Spain in 2020.

Topic was called up by the national team of Bosnia Herzegovina in 2021.

Topic retired from her professional playing career in 2024. She moved to coaching the team Zajen LA, Guadeloupe, and the Guadeloupe national team.
