= Soledad López =

Spanish handball player (born 1992)

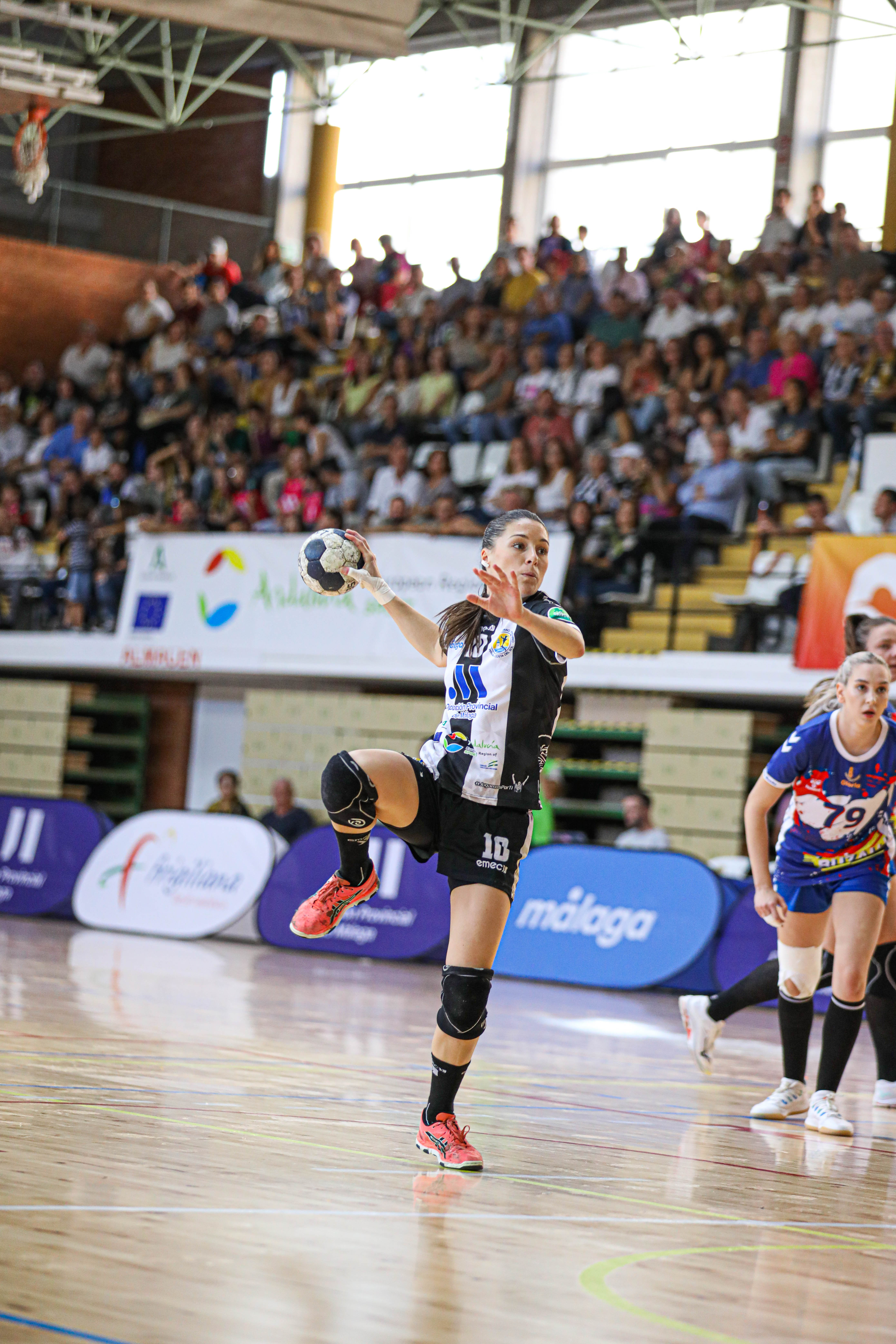

Personal information
- Full name: Soledad López Jiménez
- Nationality: Spanish
- Born: 4 April 1992 (age 34) Málaga, Spain
- Height: 1.62 m (5 ft 4 in)

Sport
- Sport: Handball
- Position: Left wing
- Current club: CBF Málaga Costa del Sol
- Number: 10

Senior clubs
- Years: Team
- 2011–: CBF Málaga Costa del Sol
National team
| Years | Team | Apps | (Gls) |
| 2018– | Spain | 97 | (206) |
Medal record
World Championship
| Silver medal – second place | 2019 Japan |
- Updated on 14 November 2024

Soledad López Jiménez (born 4 April 1992) is a Spanish female handball player for CBF Málaga Costa del Sol and the Spanish national team.

She participated at the 2018 European Women's Handball Championship.

Her twin Esperanza López is also a handball player.
