= Marta Mangué =

Spanish handball player (born 1983)

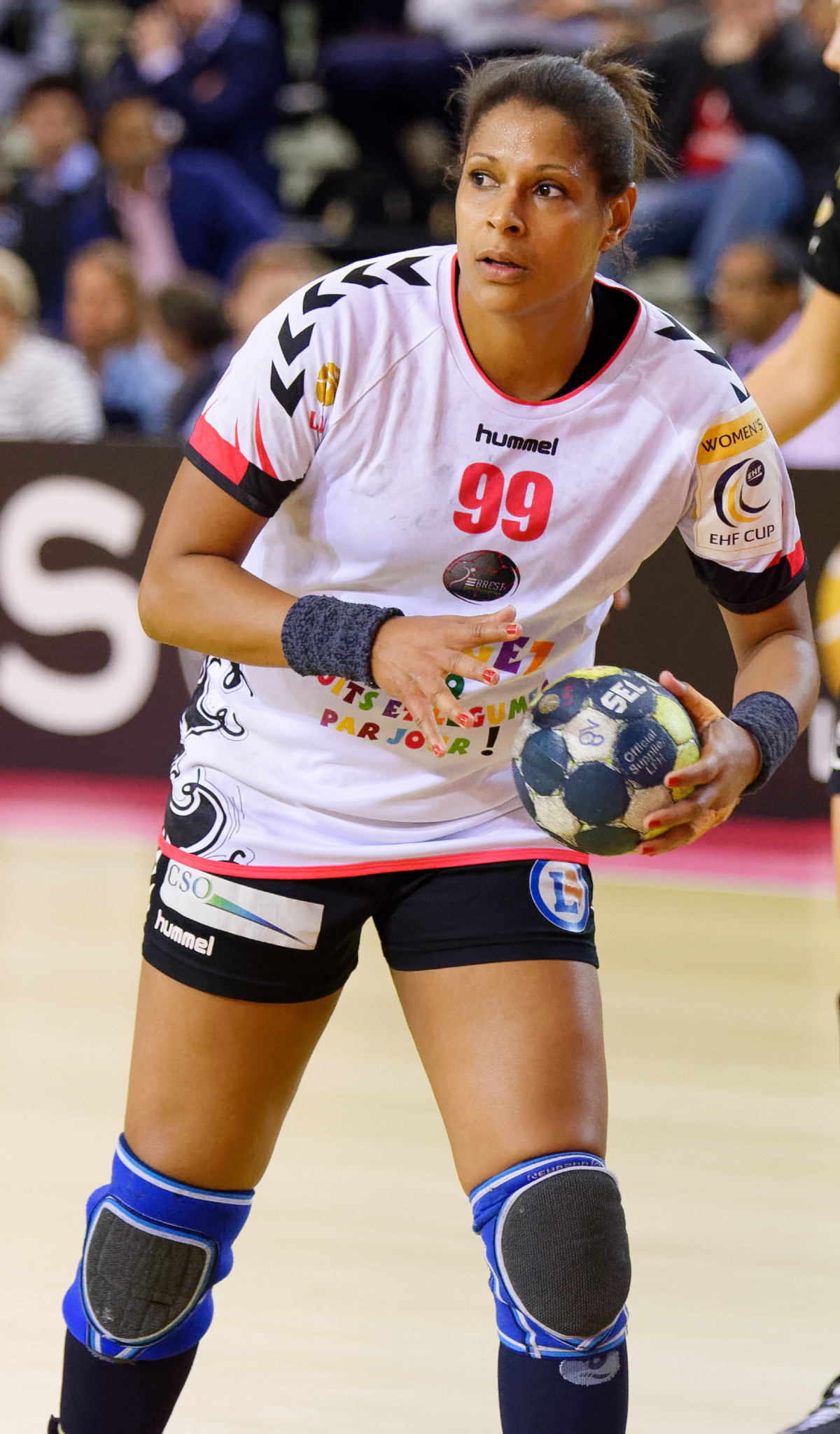
- Mangué with Brest in 2017

Personal information
- Full name: Marta Mangué González
- Born: 23 April 1983 (age 43) Las Palmas, Spain
- Height: 1.70 m (5 ft 7 in)

Sport
- Sport: Handball
- Position: Left back

Senior clubs
- Years: Team
- 2000–2002: Rocasa Gran Canaria
- 2002–2004: Astroc Sagunto
- 2004–2007: Cem. la Union-Ribarroja
- 2007–2011: Team Esbjerg
- 2011–2012: ŽRK Zaječar
- 2012–2015: Fleury Loiret HB
- 2015–2020: Brest
- 2020–2022: Bourg-de-Péage
- 2022–2023: Rocasa G.C. ACE
National team
Years	Team	Apps	(Gls)
2000–2017	Spain	301	(1034)
Medal record
Olympic Games
Bronze medal – third place	2012 London	Team
World Championship
Bronze medal – third place	2011 Brazil
European Championship
Silver medal – second place	2008 Macedonia
Silver medal – second place	2014 Croatia/Hungary
Mediterranean Games
Gold medal – first place	2005 Almería	Team

Marta Mangué González (born 23 April 1983) is a Spanish former handballer who played as a left back.

She was part of the Spain national team that won the bronze medal at the 2012 Summer Olympics. With 301 caps and 1034 goals, she holds both the record for most caps and most goals on the Spanish national team.

She was inducted into the EHF Hall of Fame in 2024.

== Career ==
Mangué started her career at Rocasa Gran Canaria, before joining Astroc Sagunto in 2002. In 2004 she joined Cem. la Union-Ribarroja. In 2007 she joined Danish side Team Esbjerg. After four years, she was released of her contract on mutual consent. She promised not to join another Danish team, and paid a small compensation for the last two years of her contract.

She then played for ŽRK Zaječar for one and a half seasons, however, due to financial reasons the Serbian club let her go in mid-December 2012. She then joined French team Fleury Loiret Handball. Here she won the Coupe de France in 2014 and the French Championship in 2015. The following summer she joined Brest Bretagne Handball In 2020 she joined Bourg-de-Péage.

In 2022 she returned to Spain and Rocasa Gran Canaria. After the 2022-23 season, she retired.

== National team ==
Mangué competed at the 2004 Summer Olympics in Athens, where the Spanish team reached the quarter finals, and finished 6th in the tournament.

She won a gold medal with the Spanish team at the 2005 Mediterranean Games in Almería.

Mangué played at the 2008 European Women's Handball Championship in Macedonia, where the Spanish team defeated Germany in the semifinal, and received silver medals after losing the final. Mangué ended up among the top ten goalscorers at the tournament.

A year later she was part of the Spanish team that finished 4th at the 2009 World Women's Handball Championship.

At the 2011 World Championships, Mangué was part of the first Spanish women's team to win a medal at world level. Spain followed this up with an Olympic bronze in 2012 and a European silver in 2014.

== Personal life ==
Mangué is bisexual. In September 2016, she became a mother after her partner gave birth to a child.

== See also ==
- List of women's handballers with 1000 or more international goals
