= Amaia González de Garibay =

Spanish handball player (born 1994)

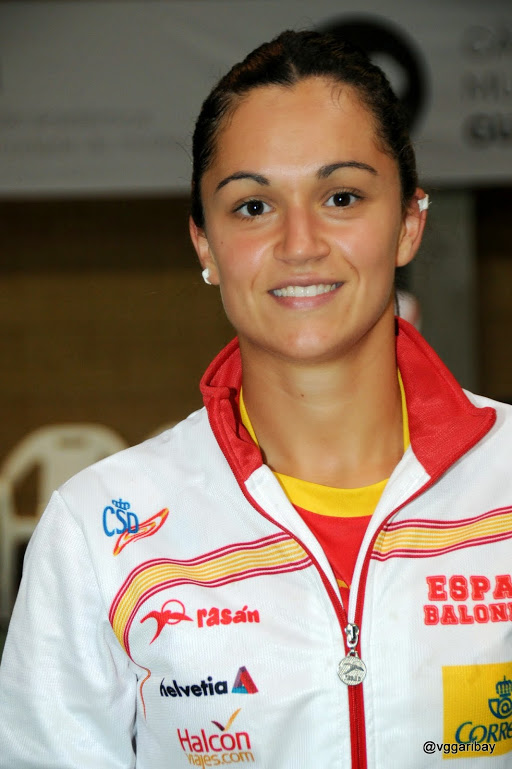

Personal information
- Full name: Amaia González de Garibay Barba
- Nationality: Spanish
- Born: 27 February 1994 (age 32) Valladolid, Spain
- Height: 1.68 m (5 ft 6 in)

Sport
- Sport: Handball
- Position: Left wing
- Current club: BM Aula Cultural
- Number: 77

Senior clubs
- Years: Team
- 2013–2017: BM Aula Cultural
- 2017–2020: Prosetecnisa BM Zuazo
- 2020–: BM Aula Cultural
National team
Years	Team	Apps	(Gls)
2015–	Spain	57	(96)
Medal record
Mediterranean Games
Gold medal – first place	2018 Tarragona	Team
- Updated on 11 December 2023

Amaia González de Garibay Barba (born 27 February 1994) is a Spanish handball player for BM Aula Cultural and the Spanish national team.

From 2017 to 2020 she played for Prosetecnisa BM Zuazo.
