= María Guadalupe Sánchez =

María Guadalupe Sánchez is the name of:

- María Guadalupe Sánchez Santiago (born 1951), Mexican politician
- María Guadalupe Sánchez (racewalker, born 1977), Mexican racewalker
- María Guadalupe Sánchez (racewalker, born 1995), Mexican racewalker
