= CBF Málaga Costa del Sol =

Women's handball team from Málaga, Spain

- Full name: Club Balonmano Femenino Málaga Costa del Sol
- Founded: 1994
- Arena: Pabellón José Luís Pérez Canca, Málaga
- Capacity: 1,788
- President: María José Moreno Triviño
- Head coach: Suso Gallardo
- League: División de Honor
- 2023–24: 3rd

Club Balonmano Femenino Málaga Costa del Sol, also known as Costa del Sol Málaga for sponsorship reasons, (former Rincón Fertilidad Málaga), is a women's handball club from Málaga in Spain. Costa del Sol Málaga competes in the División de Honor, the top tier in the Spanish league system.

== History ==
Costa del Sol Málaga was founded in 1994 after the merger of the two women's clubs from Málaga at the time, Insana and Clubai. Its first president was Fernando de Irigoyen, with Carmen Morales as vice-president.

In 1995, the team was managed by Carmen until 2001, when Carmen Morales de Setién took over. In its first season, it had a senior team (which acquired the federation rights to play in the First Division), a youth team and a cadet team. In its history it has 3 promotions and 2 relegations in the years 95, 99 and 2014. At the beginning of its journey in Spanish women's handball it was led by several coaches until Diego Carrasco took over the bench in 1997.

=== Last ascent ===
The Málaga Costa del Sol Women's Handball Club was last promoted to the División de Honor (with Diego Carrasco on the bench) in 2014, and has played in the elite of Spanish women's handball ever since. However, this has not been their only participation in the top category, and they have participated 6 times in the top national division at different times, with a total of 15 seasons in the elite.

=== The Rincón era ===
After the promotion in 2014, a sponsor arrived at the club that would change everything: Manolo Rincón. The owner of the Clínicas Rincón (dental and fertility clinics) took over 50% of the budget needed for the club to go to the Honor Division the following season and be able to compete in Europe after qualifying for the first time to play in European competitions.

At that time, the black shirt that would lead to the nickname "Panthers" appeared. Under his patronage the club won its first top-level sporting trophies.

=== Post Carrasco era ===
Diego Carrasco died suddenly in 2019 and the Malaga club had to recover from a hard moral and emotional blow. His second, Suso Gallardo, took over the bench. With the young Malaga coach, the club's greatest sporting successes were achieved. In that season (and still with the financial help of Clínicas Rincón) the club united the home-grown players, Sole and Esperanza López, with some signings that would change the history of the club (and what would be the backbone of the following sporting successes): Estela Doiro, Isabelle dos Santos, Merche Castellanos and Silvia Arderius.

=== 2019-2023: the first titles ===
Between 2019 and 2023, Costa del Sol Málaga has had the club's best seasons in its history, winning 1 Liga Guerreras Iberdrola, 2 Copas de la Reina, 1 EHF European Cup and 1 Spanish Super Cup, as well as 1 league runner-up position, 1 EHF European Cup runner-up position and 1 Spanish Super Cup runner-up position.

There have been five titles in seven finals in four years, titles with the block led by Silvia Arderius, Sole López, Merche Castellanos, Paula García, Isabelle Medeiros and Estela Doiro and with half of the team of Malaga origin, the club professionalized its organization and the sporting successes came from the hand of Suso Gallardo.

=== The first league ===
But if the Copa de la Reina and the EHF European Cup matches were important, the 2022-23 season was the one in which the first Spanish League was achieved. Silvia, Merche, Roca, Esperanza, Estela, Isabelle and Sole López, together with Virginia, María, Elena, Rocío, Gabi, Sara, Laura, Almudena and Sol raised the trophy that accredited them as champions of the first national competition.

=== Europe ===
In 2021, they were crowned European champions by winning the EHF European Cup, and the following year they reached the final again, becoming runners-up. In addition, in the second leg of the EHF European Cup final held at the Palacio de los Deportes José María Martín Carpena in Málaga, the club organized the match between Spanish clubs with the largest audience in the history of women's handball. A total of 7,183 spectators attended.

== Season to season ==
Season	Tier	Division	Pos.	Notes
1994–95	2	Primera Nacional	2nd (Group A)	Promoted
1995–96	2	División de Honor	14th	Relegated
1996–97	2	Primera Nacional	3rd (Group A)	
1997–98	2	Primera Nacional	2nd (Group C)	
1998–99	2	Primera Nacional	2nd (Group C)	Promoted
1999–00	2	División de Honor	11th	
2000–01	1	División de Honor	14th	Relegated
2001–02	2	Primera Nacional	3rd	
2002–03	2	Primera Nacional	3rd	
2003–04	2	Primera Nacional	3rd	
2004–05	2	Primera Nacional	2nd	
2005–06	2	Primera Nacional	1st (Group C)	
2006–07	2	Primera Nacional	3rd	
2007–08	2	Primera Nacional	3rd	
2008–09	2	Primera Nacional	6th	
2009–10	2	Primera Nacional	7th	

Season	Tier	Division	Pos.	Notes
2010–11	2	Primera Nacional	3rd	
2011–12	2	División de Plata	3rd	
2012–13	2	División de Plata	3rd	
2013–14	2	División de Plata	2nd	Promoted
2014–15	1	División de Honor	10th	
2015–16	1	División de Honor	9th	
2016–17	1	División de Honor	4th	
2017–18	1	División de Honor	6th	
2018–19	1	División de Honor	6th	
2019–20	1	División de Honor	4th	
2020–21	1	División de Honor	7th	
2021–22	1	División de Honor	2nd	
2022–23	1	División de Honor	1st	Champion
2023-24	1	División de Honor	3rd	Access to the group stage of the EHF European League.

== Trophies ==
- Spanish League: 1
  - 2023
- EHF European Cup: 1
  - 2021
- Copa de la Reina: 2
  - 2020, 2022
- Supercopa de España: 1
  - 2021

== Team ==
=== Current squad ===
Squad for the 2025-26 season:

Goalkepeers

- 38 (Spain) Mercedes Castellanos
- 01 (Sweden) Ida Wall

Wingers
RW

- 04 (Spain) Nayra Solis
- 44 (Spain) Maider Barros

LW

- 10 (Spain) Soledad López
- 24 (Paraguay) Ariana Portillo

Line Players

- 17 (Argentina) Rocío Campigli
- 18 (Spain) Martina Villalba
- 81 (Russia) (Spain) Ekaterina Zhukova

Back players
LB

- 13 (Brazil) María Grasielly Pereira Brasil
- 15 (Spain) Estitxu Berasategui
- 45 (Spain) Nicxon Clabel

CB

- 03 (Argentina) Martina Romero
- 27 (Spain) María Sancha

RB

- 21 (Spain) Barbara Piñeira
- 20 (Spain) Esperanza López Jiménez
- 28 (Brazil) Micaela Rodrigues

=== Transfers ===
For the 2027-28 season:

Joining

Leaving

== Notable players ==
- (Spain) Nuria Benzal
- (Spain) Paula García Ávila
- (Spain) Jennifer Gutiérrez Bermejo
- (Argentina) Elke Karsten
- (Spain) Noelia Oncina
- (Spain) Paula Valdivia Monserrat
- (Spain) Soledad López
- (Spain) Mercedes Castellanos
- (Spain) Silvia Arderius
