= María Eugenia Sánchez =

Spanish handball player (born 1969)

Personal information
- Full name: María Eugenia Sánchez Bravo
- Nationality: Spanish
- Born: 25 July 1969 (age 57) Madrid, Spain

Sport
- Sport: Handball
- Position: Goalkeeper
National team
| Years | Team | Apps | (Gls) |
| – | Spain | 195 | (0) |

María Eugenia Sánchez Bravo (born 25 July 1969) is a Spanish team handball player who played for the club BM Femenino Elda and on the Spanish national team. She was born in Madrid. She competed at the 1992 Summer Olympics in Barcelona, where the Spanish team placed seventh.
