= Cristina Gómez Arquer =

Spanish handball player (born 1968)

Cristina Gómez
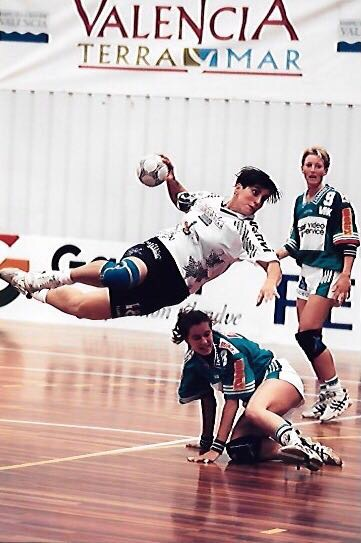

Personal information
- Full name: Cristina Gómez Arquer
- Born: 22 March 1968 (age 58) Barcelona, Spain
- Height: 168 cm (66 in)

Sport
- Sport: Handball

Senior clubs
- Years: Team
- –: Mar Valencia
National team
Years	Team	Apps	(Gls)
–	Spain	277	(897)
Medal record
Women's handball
Representing Spain
Mediterranean Games
Silver medal – second place	2001 Tunis	Team competition

Cristina Gómez Arquer (born 22 March 1968) is a Spanish handball player. She is the player with most caps (277) for the Spain women's national handball team. She scored 897 goals for the Spanish national team, more than any other player.

She competed at the 1992 Summer Olympics in Barcelona, where Spain placed 7th, and at the 2004 Summer Olympics in Athens, where the Spanish team reached the quarter finals and finished 6th.
