= Sara Gil de la Vega =

Spanish handball player (born 1994)

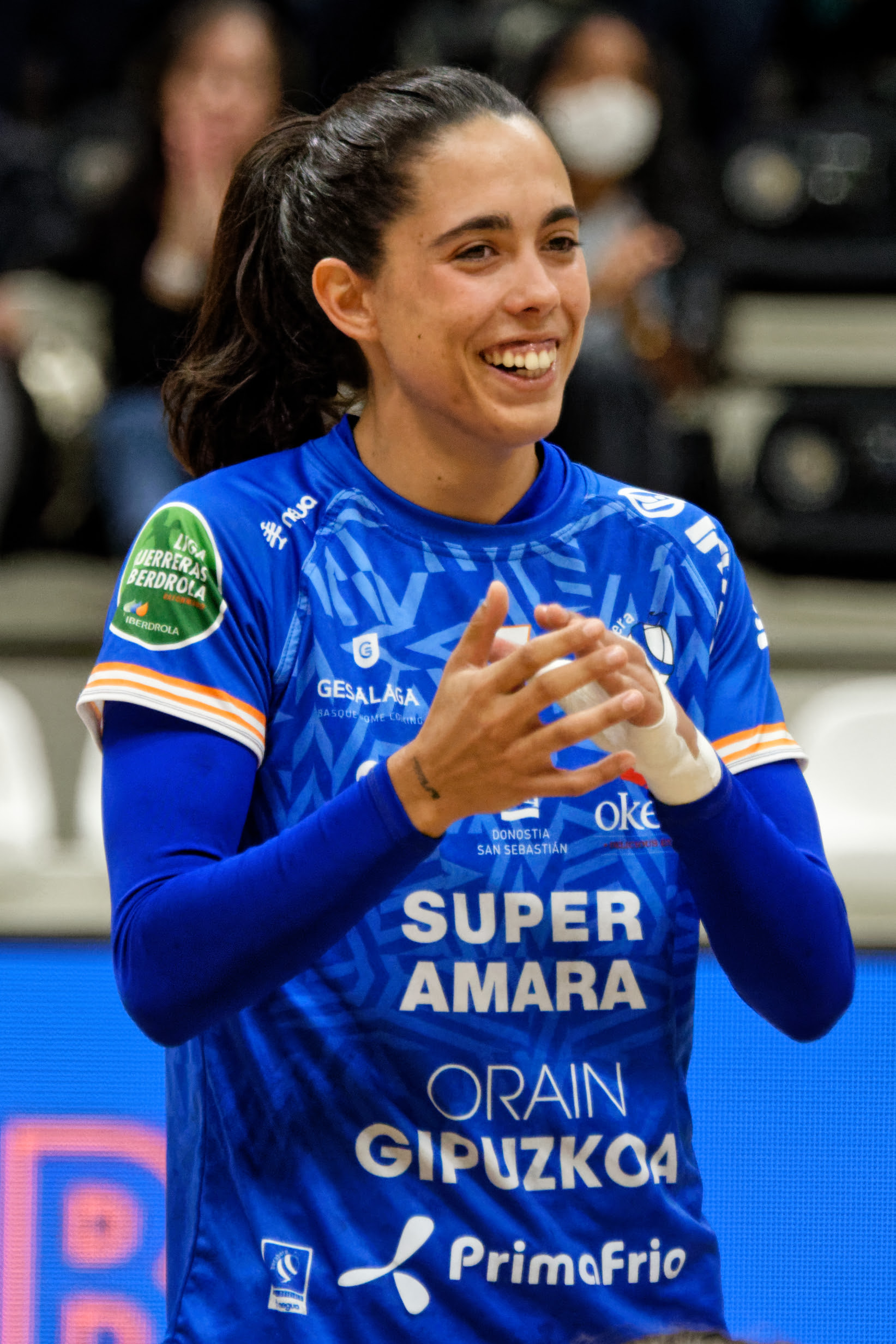
- Sara Gil de la Vega (2021)

Personal information
- Nationality: Spanish
- Born: 25 October 1994 (age 31) Barcelona, Spain
- Height: 1.68 m (5 ft 6 in)

Sport
- Sport: Handball
- Position: Left wing
- Current club: BM Bera Bera
- Number: 24

Senior clubs
- Years: Team
- 2012–2015: CH Esportiu Castelldefels
- 2015–2018: BM Porriño
- 2018–: BM Bera Bera
National team
Years	Team	Apps	(Gls)
2017–	Spain	7	(12)

Sara Gil de la Vega (born 25 October 1994) is a Spanish handball player for BM Bera Bera and the Spanish national team.

She participated at the 2018 European Women's Handball Championship.
