= CB Elche =

Spanish handball club

- Full name: Club Balonmano Elche
- Founded: 1958
- Arena: Poliesportiu de Carrús, Elche
- Capacity: 500
- President: Juan Antonio Asencio
- Head coach: Joaquín Rocamora
- League: División de Honor
- 2022-2023: 2nd

Club Balonmano Elche, also known as Elche Mustang for sponsorship reasons, is a women's handball club from Elche in Spain. CB Elche competes in the División de Honor, the top tier in the Spanish league system.

CB Elche was 2nd in the 2012–13 season. In the 2020-21 season the club won their first title, when they won both the Supercopa and Copa de la Reyna.

In 2024 they won their first European title, the 2024 European Cup.

== Titles ==
- Copa de la Reina: 2020-21
- Supercopa España: 2021-22
- EHF European Cup: 2024

== Season to season ==
Season	Tier	Division	Pos.	Notes
2000–01	2	Primera Nacional		Promoted
2001–02	1	División de Honor	5th (Group B)	
2002–03	1	División de Honor	12th	
2003–04	1	División de Honor	13th	Relegated
2004–05	2	Primera Nacional		Promoted
2005–06	1	División de Honor	14th	Relegated
2006–07	2	Primera Nacional		Promoted
2007–08	1	División de Honor	11th	
2008–09	1	División de Honor	6th	
2009–10	1	División de Honor	7th	

Season	Tier	Division	Pos.	Notes
2010–11	1	División de Honor	6th	
2011–12	1	División de Honor	6th	
2012–13	1	División de Honor	2nd	
2013–14	1	División de Honor	6th	
2014–15	1	División de Honor	5th	
2015–16	1	División de Honor	11th	
2016–17	1	División de Honor	9th	
2017–18	1	División de Honor	11th	
2018–19	1	División de Honor	7th	
2019–20	1	División de Honor		

== Team ==
=== Current squad ===
Squad for the 2026-2027 season

Goalkeepers

- 12 (Spain) Nicole Morales
- 16 (Spain) Laura Escudero
- 19 (Spain) Udane Bernabe Cobos
- 25 (Spain) Teresa Antón

Wingers
RW

- 04 (Spain) Paula Agulló
- 07 (Spain) Erika Vladu
- 24 (Spain) Laura Barrera

LW

- 06 (Spain) Lisa Oppedal
- 13 (Spain) Lidia Bomabá
- 98 (Spain) Vicky Peñas

Line Players

- 33 (Spain) Vanesa Rubio
- 41 (Uruguay) Savina Bergara

Back players
LB

- 03 (Spain) Jimena Laguna
- 05 (Argentina) Mara López
- 17 (Spain) Belen Rodríguez
- 81 (Portugal) Carmen Figuereido

CB

- 08 (Spain) Patricia Méndez
- 10 (Spain) Lucia Calleja
- 15 (Spain) Zaira Benitez
- 27 (Spain) Paola Bernabe Cobos

RB

- 11 (Spain) Daniela Aguado
- 21 (Spain) Ester Martín-Buró
- 37 (Spain) Laura Ferrer
- 44 (Spain) Eva Perez

=== Transfers ===
Transfers for the 2026-2027

Joining

- (Uruguay) Savina Bergara (LP) (from (Spain) BM Aula Cultural )
- (Argentina) Mara López (LB) ( from (Argentina) Ferro Handball)
- (Spain) Belen Rodríguez (CB) ( from (Spain) KH7 Bm Granollers)

Leaving

- (Spain) Noelia Solla (LP)
- (Cuba) Rosa Armenteros (RB)
- (Argentina) Azul Spinelli (RB) (to (Spain) Sporting BM La Rioja)
- (Spain) Clara Gascó (RW) (retires)

== Notable players ==
- (Spain) Danila So Delgado
- (Spain) Vanesa Amorós
- (Brazil) Ana Paula Belo
- (Spain) Mihaela Ciobanu
- (Spain) Lara González Ortega
- (Brazil) Chana Masson
- (Paraguay) Marizza Faría
- (Spain) África Sempere
- (Netherlands) Marieke van der Wal
