= Polideportivo Huerta del Rey =

Arena in Valladolid, Spain

Coordinates: 41.6479°N 4.7384°W

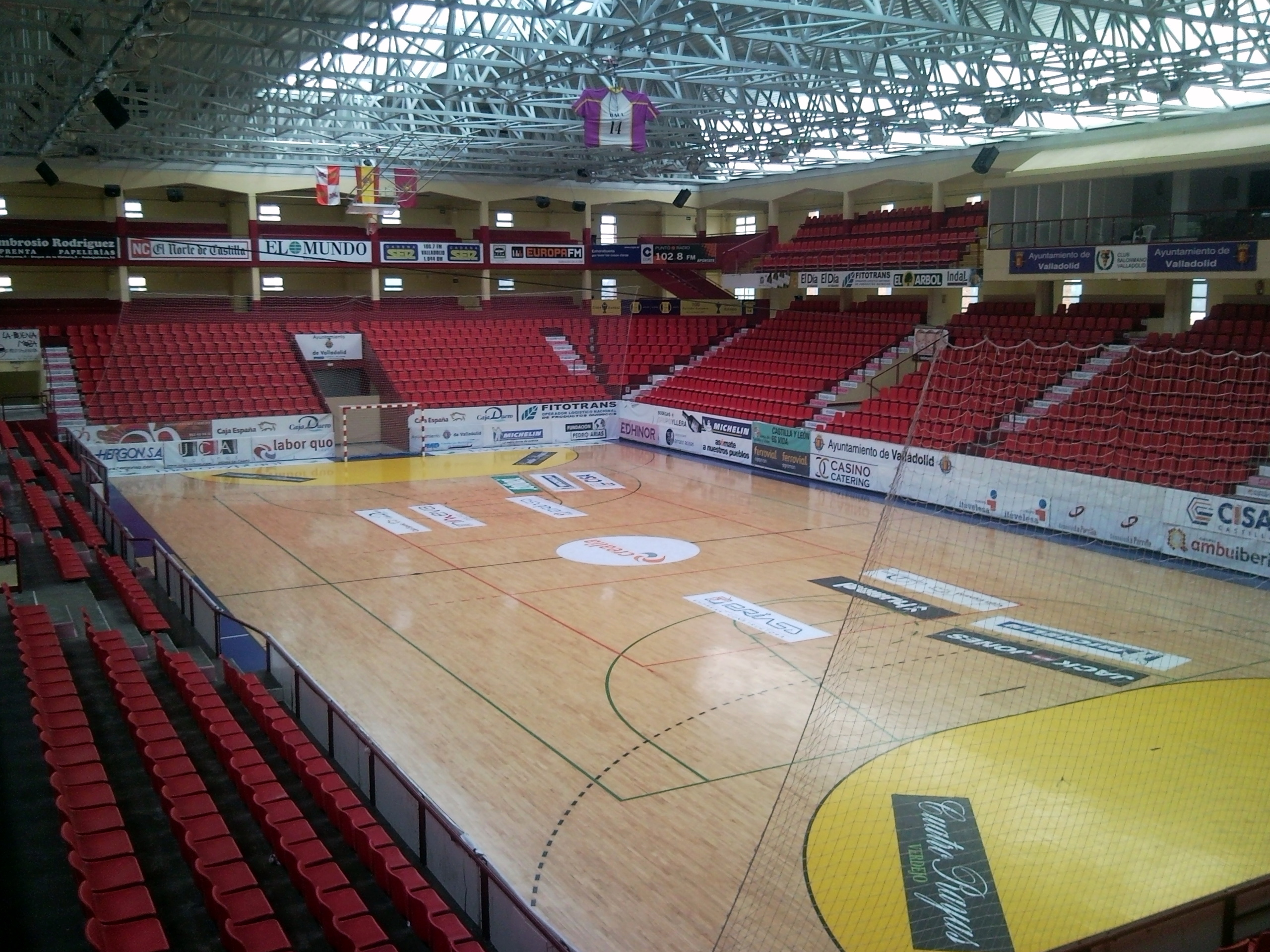
- Interactive map of Polideportivo Huerta del Rey
- Location: Valladolid, Spain
- Owner: Valladolid City Council
- Capacity: 3,502

Construction
- Opened: 1975

Tenants
- CB Valladolid (1976-1985); BM Valladolid (1991-2004); BM Atlético Valladolid; BM Aula Cultural

Polideportivo Huerta del Rey is an arena located in Valladolid, Spain. It is primarily used for team handball and is the home arena of BM Atlético Valladolid and BM Aula Cultural. From 1976 to 1985 it was the home of CB Valladolid in basketball, before moving to the Pabellón Polideportivo Pisuerga which is used by the handball team for European matches. The arena holds 3,500 people.
