= Spain women's national handball team =

Female national handball team of Spain

Spain

Information
- Nickname: Las Guerreras
- Association: Royal Spanish Handball Federation
- Coach: Ambros Martín
- Assistant coach: María Martín
- Captain: Lara González Ortega
- Most caps: Marta Mangué (301)
- Most goals: Marta Mangué (1033)

Colours
1st	2nd

Results

Summer Olympics
- Appearances: 6 (First in 1992)
- Best result: 3rd (2012)

World Championship
- Appearances: 13 (First in 1993)
- Best result: 2nd (2019)

European Championship
- Appearances: 13 (First in 1998)
- Best result: 2nd (2008, 2014)
- Last updated on Unknown.

Spain women's national handball team
Medal record

Olympic Games
Bronze medal – third place	2012 London	Team

World Championship
Silver medal – second place	2019 Japan	
Bronze medal – third place	2011 Brasil	

European Championship
Silver medal – second place	2008 Macedonia	
Silver medal – second place	2014 Croatia/Hungary	

Mediterranean Games
Gold medal – first place	2005 Almería	Team
Gold medal – first place	2018 Tarragona	Team
Gold medal – first place	2022 Oran	Team
Silver medal – second place	1979 Split	
Silver medal – second place	2001 Tunis	Team

The Spain women's national handball team is governed by the Royal Spanish Handball Federation. Spain has been world and twice continental finalist. They also have won medals in the three main international competitions: one Olympic in 2012, two World Championship (2011, 2019) and two European Championship (2008, 2014).

== Results ==
=== Olympic Games ===
Year	Position	GP	W	D	L	GS	GA	GD
(Canada) 1976	Did not qualify							
(Soviet Union) 1980	Did not qualify							
(United States) 1984	Did not qualify							
(South Korea) 1988	Did not qualify							
(Spain) 1992	7th	4	1	0	3	50	68	−18
(United States) 1996	Did not qualify							
(Australia) 2000	Did not qualify							
(Greece) 2004	6th	7	1	3	3	201	192	+9
(China) 2008	Did not qualify							
(United Kingdom) 2012	3rd (bronze)	8	5	1	2	165	196	−31
(Brazil) 2016	6th	6	3	0	3	151	143	+8
(Japan) 2020	9th	5	2	0	3	135	142	−7
(France) 2024	12th	5	0	0	5	111	143	−32
Total	6/13	35	12	4	19	813	884	−71

=== World Championship ===
Year	Position	GP	W	D	L	GS	GA	GD
(Socialist Federal Republic of Yugoslavia) 1957	Did not qualify							
(Romania) 1962	Did not qualify							
(Germany) 1965	Did not qualify							
(Netherlands) 1971	Did not qualify							
(Socialist Federal Republic of Yugoslavia) 1973	Did not qualify							
(Soviet Union) 1975	Did not qualify							
(Czechoslovakia) 1978	Did not qualify							
(Hungary) 1982	Did not qualify							
(Netherlands) 1986	Did not qualify							
(South Korea) 1990	Did not qualify							
(Norway) 1993	15th	6	1	0	5	112	141	−29
(Austria) (Hungary) 1995	Did not qualify							
(Germany) 1997	Did not qualify							
(Denmark) (Norway) 1999	Did not qualify							
(Italy) 2001	10th	6	3	0	3	161	160	+1
(Croatia) 2003	5th	9	6	1	2	258	229	+29
(Russia) 2005	Did not qualify							
(France) 2007	10th	8	3	1	4	217	227	−10
(China) 2009	4th	10	6	1	3	267	215	+52
(Brazil) 2011	3rd (bronze)	9	7	0	2	247	201	+46
(Serbia) 2013	9th	6	4	0	2	151	119	+32
(Denmark) 2015	12th	6	3	0	3	169	120	+49
(Germany) 2017	11th	6	3	1	2	158	140	+18
(Japan) 2019	2nd (silver)	10	7	1	2	303	250	+53
(Spain) 2021	4th	9	7	0	2	250	206	+44
(Denmark) (Norway) (Sweden) 2023	13th	6	4	0	2	166	144	+22
(Germany) (Netherlands) 2025	14th	6	3	0	3	166	153	+13
(Hungary) 2027	TBD							
(Spain) 2029	Qualified as host							
(Czech Republic) (Poland) 2031	TBD							
Total	13/30	97	57	5	35	2625	2315	+320

=== European Championship ===
Year	Position	GP	W	D	L	GS	GA	GD
(Germany) 1994	Did not qualify							
(Denmark) 1996	Did not qualify							
(Netherlands) 1998	12th	6	0	1	5	132	154	−22
(Romania) 2000	Did not qualify							
(Denmark) 2002	13th	3	0	2	1	76	80	−4
(Hungary) 2004	8th	7	3	0	4	185	193	−8
(Sweden) 2006	9th	6	3	0	3	150	149	+1
(North Macedonia) 2008	2nd (silver)	8	4	2	2	199	197	+2
(Denmark) (Norway) 2010	11th	6	2	0	4	143	142	+1
(Serbia) 2012	11th	6	2	1	3	153	156	−3
(Croatia) (Hungary) 2014	2nd (silver)	8	5	0	3	200	191	+9
(Sweden) 2016	11th	6	1	1	4	138	140	−2
(France) 2018	12th	6	1	0	5	152	167	−15
(Denmark) (Norway) 2020	9th	6	1	2	3	147	164	−17
(Slovenia) (North Macedonia) (Montenegro) 2022	9th	6	1	1	4	146	166	−20
(Austria) (Hungary) (Switzerland) 2024	13th	3	1	0	2	75	74	+1
(Czech Republic) (Poland) (Romania) (Slovakia) (Turkey) 2026	Qualified							
(Denmark) (Norway) (Sweden) 2028	TBD							
(Belgium) (France) 2030	TBD							
(Denmark) (Germany) (Poland) 2032	TBD							
Total	14/20	77	24	10	43	1896	1973	−77

=== Mediterranean Games ===
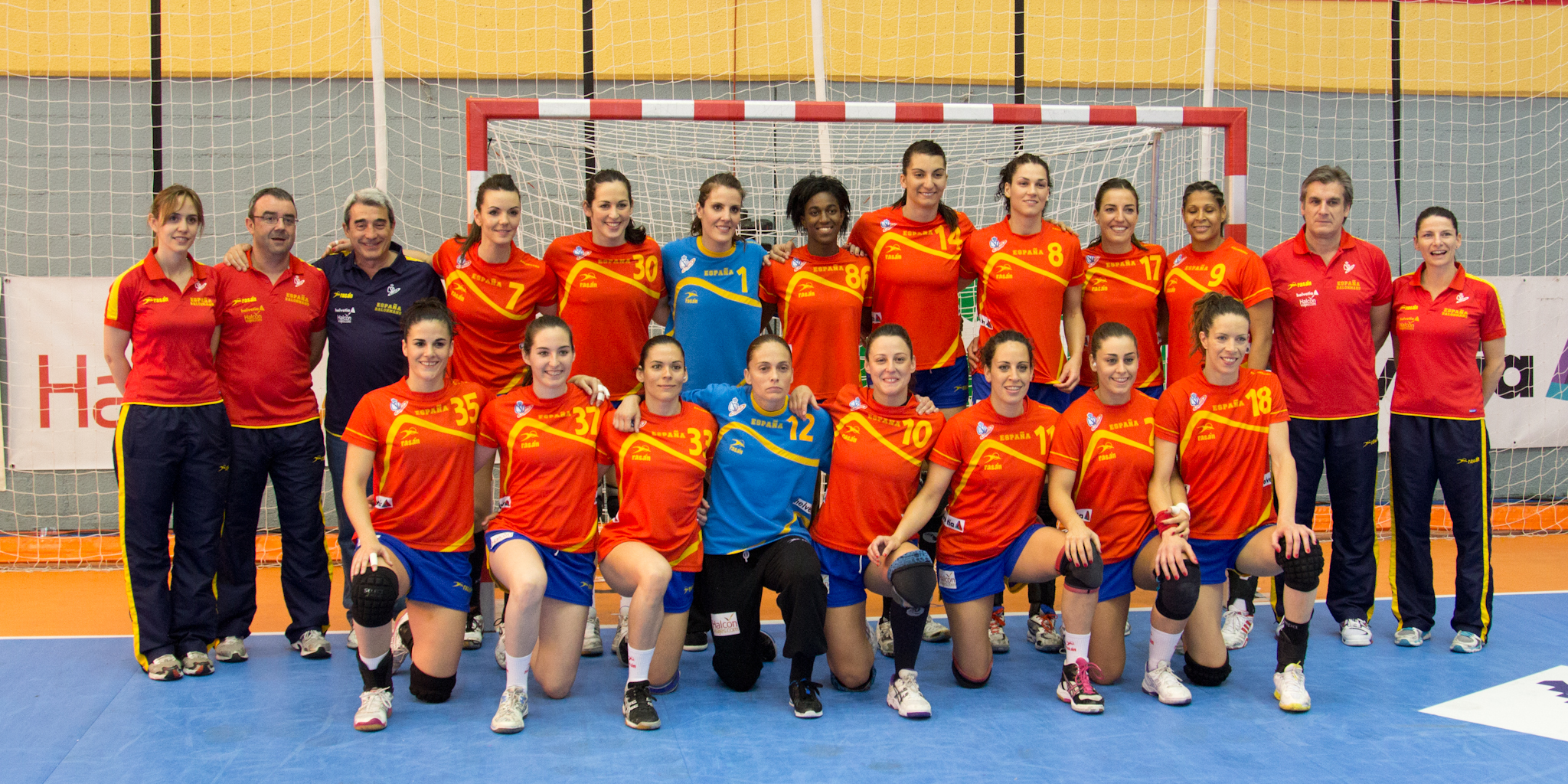
National team in 2013

- 1979 – Runners-up
- 1987 – 3rd place
- 1991 – 3rd place
- 1993 – 3rd place
- 1997 – 5th place
- 2001 – Runners-up
- 2005 – Champions
- 2009 – 4th place
- 2013 – 5th place
- 2018 – Champions
- 2022 – Champions
- 2026 – TBD
- 2030 – TBD

== Team ==
=== Current squad ===
The preliminary squad for the 2026 European Women's Handball Championship.

Head coach: Joaquín Rocamora

No.	Pos.	Name	Date of birth (age)	Height	App.	Goals	Club
2	CB	Elba Álvarez	26 May 2001 (age 25)	1.70 m	33	64	(Spain) BM Bera Bera
10	P	Elisabet Cesáreo	25 May 1999 (age 27)	1.77 m	77	75	(Poland) MKS Zagłębie Lubin
16	GK	Maddi Aalla	1 January 1997 (age 29)	1.73 m	23	0	(Hungary) Alba Fehérvár KC
17	LW	Jennifer Gutiérrez Bermejo	20 May 1995 (age 31)	1.69 m	131	326	(Romania) CS Gloria Bistrița
18	RW	Maitane Etxeberria	15 January 1997 (age 29)	1.69 m	114	212	(Spain) BM Bera Bera
24	P	Lysa Tchaptchet	20 December 2001 (age 24)	1.86 m	74	94	(Hungary) FTC-Toyota Kovács
27	LB	Danila So Delgado	19 September 2001 (age 25)	1.73 m	50	221	(Romania) CS Gloria Bistrița
31	P	Kelly Fonkeng	1 September 2006 (age 20)	1.86 m	4	4	(Spain) BM Bera Bera
34	CB	Alicia Fernández	21 December 1992 (age 33)	1.73 m	127	292	(Poland) MKS Zagłębie Lubin
37	CB	Paola Bernabé	11 August 2003 (age 23)	1.73 m	14	4	(Spain) CB Elche
45	RB	Eider Poles	10 November 2005 (age 21)	1.72 m	5	19	(Spain) Rocasa Gran Canaria
55	GK	Lucía Prades	5 October 2001 (age 25)	1.79 m	17	3	(Spain) BM Bera Bera
58	RB	María Prieto O'Mullony	3 October 1997 (age 29)	1.72 m	51	96	(Poland) MKS Lublin
65	RW	Anne Erauskin	7 November 1998 (age 28)	1.71 m	29	59	(Spain) BM Bera Bera
68	P	Lyndie Tchaptchet	13 January 2005 (age 21)	1.85 m	30	58	(France) Metz Handball
70	LB	Carmen Arroyo	3 March 2004 (age 22)	1.80 m	24	25	(Spain) BM Bera Bera
76	LW	Lisa Oppedal	20 December 2003 (age 22)	1.78 m	20	30	(Spain) CB Elche
78	LB	Belén Rodríguez Lario	2 August 2006 (age 20)	1.73 m	6	10	(Spain) CB Elche
82	LB	Adrianna Mallo	24 August 2002 (age 24)	1.74 m	4	2	(Spain) BM Porriño
93	GK	Nicole Morales	5 August 1998 (age 28)	1.72 m	23	1	(Spain) CB Elche

=== Coaching history ===
Period	Coach
2002–2004	(Spain) José Francisco Aldeguer
2007–2017	(Spain) Jorge Dueñas
2017–2021	(Spain) Carlos Viver
2021–2023	(Spain) José Ignacio Prades Pons
2023–present	(Spain) Ambros Martín

=== Notable players ===
Players who have seen their individual performance recognized at international tournaments, either as Most Valuable Player or as a member of the All-Star Team.

All-Star Team

- Carmen Martín, 2008 Junior World Championship, 2011 World Championship, 2014 European Championship, 2016 European Championship, 2018 European Championship
- Begoña Fernández, 2008 European Championship, 2009 World Championship
- Marta Mangué, 2009 World Championship, 2012 Summer Olympics
- Nerea Pena, 2010 European Championship
- Alexandrina Cabral, 2019 World Championship

=== Individual all-time records ===
Still active players are highlighted

==== Most matches played ====
Total number of matches played for the senior national team.

#	Player	Matches	Goals
1	Marta Mangué	301	1034
2	Cristina Gómez Arquer	277	897
3	Carmen Martín	250	866
4	Silvia Navarro	249	13
5	Macarena Aguilar	240	638
6	Elisabeth Pinedo	201	441
7	Montserrat Puche Díaz	196	736
8	María Eugenia Sánchez Bravo	195	0
9	Elisabeth Chávez	185	130
10	Beatriz Fernández	182	380

Last updated: 25 July 2024

==== Most goals scored ====
Total number of goals scored in official matches only.

#	Player	Goals	Matches	Average
1	Marta Mangué	1034	301	3.44
2	Cristina Gómez Arquer	897	277	3.24
3	Carmen Martín	866	250	3.46
4	Alexandrina Cabral	750	166	4.52
5	Montserrat Puche Díaz	736	196	3.76
6	Macarena Aguilar	638	240	2.66
7	Nerea Pena	595	176	3.38
8	Elisabeth Pinedo	441	201	2.19
9	Susana Fraile Celaya	411	131	3.14
10	Noelia Oncina	406	174	2.33

Last updated: 25 July 2024

== Youth teams ==
=== U-20 ===
- U-20 Handball World Championship

- Fourth place: 2001, 2008

=== U-19 ===
- U-19 Handball European Championship

- Runner-up: 2007
- Third place: 2002

=== U-18 ===
- U-18 Handball World Championship

- Winner: 2024

=== U-17 ===
- U-17 Handball European Championship

- Winner: 1997
- Runner-up: 2007
