= División de Honor Femenina de Balonmano =

Spanish women's handball league

Liga Guerreras Iberdrola
- Founded: 1952
- No. of teams: 14
- Country: Spain
- Confederation: EHF
- Most recent champion: Rocasa Gran Canaria (2nd title) (2025–26)
- Most titles: Parc Sagunto (27 titles)
- Broadcaster: Teledeporte
- Level on pyramid: 1
- Relegation to: División de Honor Oro Femenina
- International cups: Champions League; EHF Cup; Challenge Cup
- Website: https://www.rfebm.com/
- 2025–26 season

División de Honor Femenina de Balonmano or Liga Guerreras Iberdrola, named after the sponsorship of Iberdrola, is the premier women's professional handball league in Spain, administered by the Royal Spanish Handball Federation (RFEBM). It was established in 1952, and it is currently contested by twelve teams.

The 4 last ranked teams are relegated to División de Honor Oro Femenina, a league newly created for the 2022–2023 season. For a long time, the 2nd level of the Spanish women's handball pyramid was División de Plata (the 3rd level as of now).

== History ==
The championship was founded in 1953, though it was cancelled in 1955 before it was resumed in 1961. Balonmano Sagunto, formerly known as Medina, Íber, and Mar Valencia, is the championship's most successful club with 27 titles, having dominated the competition throughout the 1980s and most of the 1990s, while SD Itxako has become its major team in recent years, ending the hegemony of Valencian clubs for the past three decades.

The Spanish leading teams have been fairly successful in international competitions since the 1990s. Mar Valencia won the 1997 Champions League and the 2000 Cup Winners' Cup, while CB Amadeo Tortajada and SD Itxako have won the EHF Cup. In 2011, Itxako and CB Mar Alicante reached the final of the Champions League and the Cup Winners' Cup respectively.

It changed its official name before 2011–12 season to División de Honor Femenina de Balonmano. It was called Liga ABF between 2003 and 2011.

== Championship rules ==
Each team in every division has to play with all the other teams in its division twice, once at home and the other at the opponent's stadium. This means that, like its counterparts in Liga ASOBAL, each División de Honor season ends after every team plays 26 matches.

Like many other leagues in continental Europe, the División de Honor takes a winter break once each team has played half its schedule. One unusual feature of the league is that the two halves of the season are played in the same order—that is, the order of each team's first-half fixtures is repeated in the second half of the season, with the only difference being the stadiums used.

Each victory adds 2 points to the team in the league ranking. Each draw adds 1 point head-to-head. At the end of the league, the winner is:

1. The team that has the most points in the ranking.
2. If two or more teams are level on points, the winner is the team that has the best results
3. If there is no winner after applying the second rule, then the team with the best overall goal difference wins.

== List of champions ==
- 1953 Sección Femenina (Madrid)
- 1954 Sección Femenina (Madrid)
- 1955 Sección Femenina (Madrid)
- 1961 Sección Femenina (Barcelona)
- 1962 SH A Coruña
- 1963 Medina Barcelona
- 1964 Picadero
- 1965 Picadero
- 1966 Picadero
- 1967 Picadero
- 1968 Medina Valencia
- 1969 Medina Valencia
- 1970 Picadero
- 1971 Atlético Madrid
- 1972 Atlético Madrid
- 1973 Medina Guipúzcoa
- 1974 Medina Valencia
- 1975 Medina Guipúzcoa
- 1976 Atlético Madrid
- 1977 Atlético Madrid
- 1978 Atlético Madrid
- 1979 Medina-Íber Valencia
- 1980 Íber Valencia
- 1981 Íber Valencia
- 1982 Íber Valencia
- 1983 Íber Valencia
- 1984 Íber Valencia
- 1985 Íber Valencia
- 1986 Íber Valencia
- 1987 Íber Valencia
- 1988 Íber Valencia
- 1989 Íber Valencia
- 1990 Íber Valencia
- 1991 Íber Valencia
- 1992 Íber Valencia
- 1993 Mar Valencia
- 1994 Mar Valencia
- 1995 Mar Valencia
- 1996 Mar Valencia
- 1997 Mar Valencia
- 1998 Mar Valencia
- 1999 Elda
- 2000 Mar Valencia
- 2001 Mar Valencia
- 2002 Mar Valencia
- 2003 Elda
- 2004 Elda
- 2005 Mar Valencia
- 2006 Amadeo Tortajada
- 2007 Amadeo Tortajada
- 2008 Elda
- 2009 Itxako
- 2010 Itxako
- 2011 Itxako
- 2012 Itxako
- 2013 Bera Bera
- 2014 Bera Bera
- 2015 Bera Bera
- 2016 Bera Bera
- 2017 Mecalia Atlético. Guardés
- 2018 Bera Bera
- 2019 Rocasa Gran Canaria
- 2020 Bera Bera
- 2021 Bera Bera
- 2022 Bera Bera
- 2023 Costa del Sol Málaga
- 2024 Bera Bera
- 2025 Bera Bera
- 2026 Rocasa Gran Canaria

=== Performance by club ===
Club	Titles	Seasons
Sagunto	27	1967–68, 1968–69, 1973–74, 1978–79, 1979–80, 1980–81, 1981–82, 1982–83, 1983–84, 1984–85, 1985–86, 1986–87, 1987–88, 1988–89, 1989–90, 1990–91, 1991–92, 1992–93, 1993–94, 1994–95, 1995–96, 1996–97, 1997–98, 1999–00, 2000–01, 2001–02, 2004–05
Bera Bera	10	2012–13, 2013–14, 2014–15, 2015–16, 2017–18, 2019–20, 2020–21, 2021–22, 2023–24, 2024–25
Picadero	5	1963–64, 1964–65, 1965–66, 1966–67, 1969–70
Atlético Madrid	5	1970–71, 1971–72, 1975–76, 1976–77, 1977–78
Elda	4	1998–99, 2002–03, 2003–04, 2007–08
Itxako	4	2008–09, 2009–10, 2010–11, 2011–12
S.F. de Madrid	3	1952–53, 1953–54, 1954–55
S.F./Medina Barcelona	2	1960–61, 1962–63
Medina Guipúzcoa	2	1972–73, 1974–75
Amadeo Tortajada	2	2005–06, 2006–07
Rocasa Gran Canaria	2	2018–19, 2025–26
Costa del Sol Málaga	1	2022–23
Mecalia Atlético Guardés	1	2016–17
Hípica A Coruña	1	1961–62

== See also ==
- Copa de la Reina
- Supercopa de España
