= List of World Swimming Championships (25 m) medalists (men) =

This is the complete list of men's World Championships medalists in short-course swimming from 1993 to 2024.

== 50 metre freestyle ==
Year	Gold	Silver	Bronze
1993 Palma de Mallorca	Mark Foster (GBR)	Hu Bin (CHN)	Robert Abernethy (AUS)
1995 Rio de Janeiro	Francisco Sánchez (VEN)	Fernando Scherer (BRA)	Jiang Chengji (CHN)
1997 Gothenburg	Francisco Sánchez (VEN)	Mark Foster (GBR)	Ricardo Busquets (PUR)
1999 Hong Kong	Mark Foster (GBR)	José Meolans (ARG)	Mark Veens (NED)
2000 Athens	Mark Foster (GBR)	Brendon Dedekind (RSA)	Stefan Nystrand (SWE)
2002 Moscow	José Meolans (ARG)	Mark Foster (GBR)	Oleksandr Volynets (UKR)
2002 Moscow	José Meolans (ARG)	Mark Foster (GBR)	Alexander Popov (RUS)
2004 Indianapolis	Mark Foster (GBR)	Stefan Nystrand (SWE)	Nicholas Brunelli (USA)
2004 Indianapolis	Mark Foster (GBR)	Stefan Nystrand (SWE)	Nicholas Santos (BRA)
2006 Shanghai	Duje Draganja (CRO)	Cullen Jones (USA)	Oleksandr Volynets (UKR)
2006 Shanghai	Duje Draganja (CRO)	Cullen Jones (USA)	Nicholas Brunelli (USA)
2008 Manchester	Duje Draganja (CRO)	Mark Foster (GBR)	Gerhard Zandberg (RSA)
2010 Dubai	César Cielo Filho (BRA)	Frédérick Bousquet (FRA)	Josh Schneider (USA)
2012 Istanbul	Vladimir Morozov (RUS)	Florent Manaudou (FRA)	Anthony Ervin (USA)
2014 Doha	Florent Manaudou (FRA)	Marco Orsi (ITA)	César Cielo Filho (BRA)
2016 Windsor	Jesse Puts (NED)	Vladimir Morozov (RUS)	Simonas Bilis (LTU)
2018 Hangzhou	Vladimir Morozov (RUS)	Caeleb Dressel (USA)	Brad Tandy (RSA)
2021 Abu Dhabi	Benjamin Proud (GBR)	Ryan Held (USA)	Joshua Liendo (CAN)
2022 Melbourne	Jordan Crooks (CAY)	Benjamin Proud (GBR)	Dylan Carter (TTO)
2024 Budapest	Jordan Crooks (CAY)	Guilherme Caribé (BRA)	Jack Alexy (USA)

Rank	Nation	Gold	Silver	Bronze	Total
1	Great Britain	5	4		9
2	Russia	2	1	1	4
3	Croatia	2			2
3	Venezuela	2			2
3	Cayman Islands	2			2
6	Brazil	1	2	2	5
7	France	1	2		3
8	Argentina	1	1		2
9	Netherlands	1		1	2
10	United States		3	5	8
11	South Africa		1	2	3
12	China		1	1	2
12	Sweden		1	1	2
14	Italy		1		1
15	Ukraine			2	2
16	Canada			1	1
16	Lithuania			1	1
16	Puerto Rico			1	1
16	Trinidad and Tobago			1	1
16	Australia			1	1
Total		17	17	20	54

== 100 metre freestyle ==
Year	Gold	Silver	Bronze
1993 Palma de Mallorca	Fernando Scherer (BRA)	Gustavo Borges (BRA)	Jon Olsen (USA)
1995 Rio de Janeiro	Fernando Scherer (BRA)	Gustavo Borges (BRA)	Francisco Sánchez (VEN)
1997 Gothenburg	Francisco Sánchez (VEN)	Gustavo Borges (BRA)	Michael Klim (AUS)
1999 Hong Kong	Lars Frölander (SWE)	Michael Klim (AUS)	Bartosz Kizierowski (POL)
2000 Athens	Lars Frölander (SWE)	Stefan Nystrand (SWE)	Scott Tucker (USA)
2002 Moscow	Ashley Callus (AUS)	José Meolans (ARG)	Salim Iles (ALG)
2004 Indianapolis	Jason Lezak (USA)	Salim Iles (ALG)	Rick Say (CAN)
2006 Shanghai	Ryk Neethling (RSA)	Filippo Magnini (ITA)	José Meolans (ARG)
2008 Manchester	Nathan Adrian (USA)	Filippo Magnini (ITA)	Duje Draganja (CRO)
2010 Dubai	César Cielo Filho (BRA)	Fabien Gilot (FRA)	Nikita Lobintsev (RUS)
2012 Istanbul	Vladimir Morozov (RUS)	Tommaso D'Orsogna (AUS)	Yevgeny Lagunov (RUS)
2014 Doha	César Cielo Filho (BRA)	Florent Manaudou (FRA)	Danila Izotov (RUS)
2016 Windsor	Simonas Bilis (LTU)	Shinri Shioura (JPN)	Tommaso D'Orsogna (AUS)
2018 Hangzhou	Caeleb Dressel (USA)	Vladimir Morozov (RUS)	Chad le Clos (RSA)
2021 Abu Dhabi	Alessandro Miressi (ITA)	Ryan Held (USA)	Joshua Liendo (CAN)
2022 Melbourne	Kyle Chalmers (AUS)	Maxime Grousset (FRA)	Alessandro Miressi (ITA)
2024 Budapest	Jack Alexy (USA)	Guilherme Caribé (BRA)	Jordan Crooks (CAY)

Rank	Nation	Gold	Silver	Bronze	Total
1	Brazil	4	4		8
2	United States	4	1	2	7
3	Australia	2	2	2	6
4	Sweden	2	1	0	3
5	Italy	1	2	1	4
6	Russia	1	1	3	5
7	South Africa	1		1	2
7	Venezuela	1		1	2
9	Lithuania	1			1
10	France		3		3
11	Algeria		1	1	2
11	Argentina		1	1	2
13	Japan		1		1
14	Canada			2	2
15	Croatia			1	1
15	Poland			1	1
15	Cayman Islands			1	1
Total		17	17	17	51

== 200 metre freestyle ==
Year	Gold	Silver	Bronze
1993 Palma de Mallorca	Antti Kasvio (FIN)	Artur Wojdat (POL)	none awarded
1993 Palma de Mallorca	Antti Kasvio (FIN)	Trent Bray (NZL)	none awarded
1995 Rio de Janeiro	Gustavo Borges (BRA)	Trent Bray (NZL)	Michael Klim (AUS)
1997 Gothenburg	Gustavo Borges (BRA)	Trent Bray (NZL)	Lars Conrad (GER)
1999 Hong Kong	Ian Thorpe (AUS)	Michael Klim (AUS)	Pieter van den Hoogenband (NED)
2000 Athens	Bela Szabados (HUN)	Massimiliano Rosolino (ITA)	Chad Carvin (USA)
2002 Moscow	Klete Keller (USA)	Gustavo Borges (BRA)	Mark Johnston (CAN)
2004 Indianapolis	Michael Phelps (USA)	Rick Say (CAN)	Ryan Lochte (USA)
2006 Shanghai	Ryk Neethling (RSA)	Filippo Magnini (ITA)	Massimiliano Rosolino (ITA)
2008 Manchester	Kenrick Monk (AUS)	Kirk Palmer (AUS)	Massimiliano Rosolino (ITA)
2010 Dubai	Ryan Lochte (USA)	Danila Izotov (RUS)	Oussama Mellouli (TUN)
2012 Istanbul	Ryan Lochte (USA)	Paul Biedermann (GER)	Conor Dwyer (USA)
2014 Doha	Chad le Clos (RSA)	Danila Izotov (RUS)	Ryan Lochte (USA)
2016 Windsor	Park Tae-hwan (KOR)	Chad le Clos (RSA)	Aleksandr Krasnykh (RUS)
2018 Hangzhou	Blake Pieroni (USA)	Danas Rapšys (LTU)	Alexander Graham (AUS)
2021 Abu Dhabi	Hwang Sun-woo (KOR)	Aleksandr Shchegolev (RSF)	Danas Rapšys (LTU)
2022 Melbourne	Hwang Sun-woo (KOR)	David Popovici (ROM)	Tom Dean (GBR)
2024 Budapest	Luke Hobson (USA)	Maximillian Giuliani (AUS)	Lucas Henveaux (BEL)

Rank	Nation	Gold	Silver	Bronze	Total
1	United States	6		4	10
2	South Korea	3			3
3	Australia	2	3	2	7
4	South Africa	2	1		3
4	Brazil	2	1		3
6	Finland	1			1
6	Hungary	1			1
8	New Zealand		3		3
9	Italy		2	2	4
10	Russia		2	1	3
11	Canada		1	1	2
11	Germany		1	1	2
11	Lithuania		1	1	2
14	Poland		1		1
14	RSF		1		1
14	Romania		1		1
17	Netherlands			1	1
17	Tunisia			1	1
17	Great Britain			1	1
17	Belgium			1	1
Total		17	18	16	51

== 400 metre freestyle ==
Year	Gold	Silver	Bronze
1993 Palma de Mallorca	Daniel Kowalski (AUS)	Antti Kasvio (FIN)	Paul Palmer (GBR)
1995 Rio de Janeiro	Daniel Kowalski (AUS)	Jörg Hoffmann (GER)	Malcolm Allen (AUS)
1997 Gothenburg	Jacob Carstensen (DEN)	Chad Carvin (USA)	Grant Hackett (AUS)
1999 Hong Kong	Grant Hackett (AUS)	Ian Thorpe (AUS)	Massimiliano Rosolino (ITA)
2000 Athens	Chad Carvin (USA)	Paul Palmer (GBR)	Massimiliano Rosolino (ITA)
2002 Moscow	Grant Hackett (AUS)	Květoslav Svoboda (CZE)	Chad Carvin (USA)
2004 Indianapolis	Yuri Prilukov (RUS)	Chad Carvin (USA)	Justin Mortimer (USA)
2006 Shanghai	Yuri Prilukov (RUS)	Park Tae-hwan (KOR)	Massimiliano Rosolino (ITA)
2008 Manchester	Yuri Prilukov (RUS)	Massimiliano Rosolino (ITA)	Robert Renwick (GBR)
2010 Dubai	Paul Biedermann (GER)	Nikita Lobintsev (RUS)	Oussama Mellouli (TUN)
2012 Istanbul	Paul Biedermann (GER)	Hao Yun (CHN)	Matthew Stanley (NZL)
2014 Doha	Péter Bernek (HUN)	James Guy (GBR)	Velimir Stjepanović (SRB)
2016 Windsor	Park Tae-hwan (KOR)	Aleksandr Krasnykh (RUS)	Péter Bernek (HUN)
2018 Hangzhou	Danas Rapšys (LTU)	Henrik Christiansen (NOR)	Gabriele Detti (ITA)
2021 Abu Dhabi	Felix Auböck (AUT)	Danas Rapšys (LTU)	Antonio Djakovic (SUI)
2022 Melbourne	Kieran Smith (USA)	Thomas Neill (AUS)	Danas Rapšys (LTU)
2024 Budapest	Elijah Winnington (AUS)	Carson Foster (USA)	none awarded
2024 Budapest	Elijah Winnington (AUS)	Kieran Smith (USA)	none awarded

Rank	Nation	Gold	Silver	Bronze	Total
1	Australia	5	2	2	9
2	Russia	3	2		5
3	United States	2	4	2	8
4	Germany	2	1		3
5	Lithuania	1	1	1	3
6	South Korea	1	1		2
7	Hungary	1		1	2
8	Austria	1			1
8	Denmark	1			1
9	United Kingdom		2	2	4
10	Italy		1	4	5
11	China		1		1
11	Czech Republic		1		1
11	Finland		1		1
11	Norway		1		1
12	New Zealand			1	1
12	Serbia			1	1
12	Switzerland			1	1
12	Tunisia			1	1
Total		17	18	16	51

== 800 metre freestyle ==
Year	Gold	Silver	Bronze
2022 Melbourne	Gregorio Paltrinieri (ITA)	Henrik Christiansen (NOR)	Logan Fontaine (FRA)
2024 Budapest	Zalán Sárkány (HUN)	Florian Wellbrock (GER)	Ahmed Jaouadi (TUN)

Rank	Nation	Gold	Silver	Bronze	Total
1	Italy	1			1
1	Hungary	1			1
3	Norway		1		1
3	Germany		1		1
5	France			1	1
5	Tunisia			1	1
Total		2	2	2	6

== 1500 metre freestyle ==
Year	Gold	Silver	Bronze
1993 Palma de Mallorca	Daniel Kowalski (AUS)	Jörg Hoffmann (GER)	Piotr Albinski (POL)
1995 Rio de Janeiro	Daniel Kowalski (AUS)	Ian Wilson (GBR)	Jörg Hoffmann (GER)
1997 Gothenburg	Grant Hackett (AUS)	Jörg Hoffmann (GER)	Graeme Smith (GBR)
1999 Hong Kong	Grant Hackett (AUS)	Graeme Smith (GBR)	Daniel Kowalski (AUS)
2000 Athens	Jörg Hoffmann (GER)	Igor Chervynskyi (UKR)	Chad Carvin (USA)
2002 Moscow	Grant Hackett (AUS)	Chris Thompson (USA)	Christian Minotti (ITA)
2004 Indianapolis	Yuri Prilukov (RUS)	Simone Ercoli (ITA)	Dragoș Coman (ROM)
2006 Shanghai	Yuri Prilukov (RUS)	Park Tae-hwan (KOR)	Zhang Lin (CHN)
2008 Manchester	Yuri Prilukov (RUS)	David Davies (GBR)	Mateusz Sawrymowicz (POL)
2010 Dubai	Oussama Mellouli (TUN)	Mads Glæsner (DEN)	Gergely Gyurta (HUN)
2012 Istanbul	Mads Glæsner (DEN)	Gregorio Paltrinieri (ITA)	Pál Joensen (FRO)
2014 Doha	Gregorio Paltrinieri (ITA)	Oussama Mellouli (TUN)	Ryan Cochrane (CAN)
2016 Windsor	Park Tae-hwan (KOR)	Gregorio Paltrinieri (ITA)	Wojciech Wojdak (POL)
2018 Hangzhou	Mykhailo Romanchuk (UKR)	Gregorio Paltrinieri (ITA)	Henrik Christiansen (NOR)
2021 Abu Dhabi	Florian Wellbrock (GER)	Ahmed Hafnaoui (TUN)	Mykhailo Romanchuk (UKR)
2022 Melbourne	Gregorio Paltrinieri (ITA)	Damien Joly (FRA)	Henrik Christiansen (NOR)
2024 Budapest	Ahmed Jaouadi (TUN)	Florian Wellbrock (GER)	Kuzey Tunçelli (TUR)

Rank	Nation	Gold	Silver	Bronze	Total
1	Australia	5		1	6
2	Russia	3			3
3	Italy	2	4	1	7
4	Germany	2	3	1	6
5	Tunisia	2	2		4
6	Ukraine	1	1	1	3
7	Denmark	1	1		2
7	South Korea	1	1		2
9	Great Britain		3	1	4
10	United States		1	1	2
11	France		1		1
12	Poland			3	3
13	Norway			2	2
14	Canada			1	1
14	China			1	1
14	Faroe Islands			1	1
14	Hungary			1	1
14	Romania			1	1
14	Turkey			1	1
Total		17	17	17	51

== 50 metre backstroke ==
Year	Gold	Silver	Bronze
1999 Hong Kong	Rodolfo Falcón (CUB)	Mariusz Siembida (POL)	Matt Welsh (AUS)
2000 Athens	Neil Walker (USA)	Lenny Krayzelburg (USA)	Rodolfo Falcón (CUB)
2002 Moscow	Matt Welsh (AUS)	Peter Marshall (USA)	Toni Helbig (GER)
2004 Indianapolis	Thomas Rupprath (GER)	Matt Welsh (AUS)	Peter Marshall (USA)
2006 Shanghai	Matt Welsh (AUS)	Thomas Rupprath (GER)	Helge Meeuw (GER)
2008 Manchester	Peter Marshall (USA)	Liam Tancock (GBR)	Ashley Delaney (AUS)
2010 Dubai	Stanislav Donets (RUS)	Sun Xiaolei (CHN)	none awarded
2010 Dubai	Stanislav Donets (RUS)	Aschwin Wildeboer (ESP)	none awarded
2012 Istanbul	Robert Hurley (AUS)	Matt Grevers (USA)	Stanislav Donets (RUS)
2014 Doha	Florent Manaudou (FRA)	Eugene Godsoe (USA)	Stanislav Donets (RUS)
2016 Windsor	Junya Koga (JPN)	Jérémy Stravius (FRA)	Pavel Sankovich (BLR)
2018 Hangzhou	Evgeny Rylov (RUS)	Ryan Murphy (USA)	Shane Ryan (IRL)
2021 Abu Dhabi	Kliment Kolesnikov (RSF)	Christian Diener (GER)	none awarded
2021 Abu Dhabi	Kliment Kolesnikov (RSF)	Lorenzo Mora (ITA)	none awarded
2022 Melbourne	Ryan Murphy (USA)	Isaac Cooper (AUS)	Kacper Stokowski (POL)
2024 Budapest	Miron Lifintsev (NAB)	Isaac Cooper (AUS)	Shane Ryan (IRL)

Rank	Nation	Gold	Silver	Bronze	Total
1	United States	3	5	1	9
2	Australia	3	3	2	8
3	Russia	2		2	4
4	Germany	1	2	2	5
5	France	1	1		2
6	Cuba	1		1	2
7	Japan	1			1
7	RSF	1			1
7	Neutral Athletes B	1			1
10	Poland		1	1	2
11	China		1		1
11	Italy		1		1
11	Spain		1		1
11	Great Britain		1		1
15	Ireland			2	2
16	Belarus			1	1
Total		14	16	12	42

== 100 metre backstroke ==
Year	Gold	Silver	Bronze
1993 Palma de Mallorca	Tripp Schwenk (USA)	Martin Harris (GBR)	Rodolfo Falcón (CUB)
1995 Rio de Janeiro	Rodolfo Falcón (CUB)	Neil Willey (GBR)	Jirka Letzin (GER)
1997 Gothenburg	Neisser Bent (CUB)	Brian Retterer (USA)	Adrian Radley (AUS)
1999 Hong Kong	Rodolfo Falcón (CUB)	Matt Welsh (AUS)	Mariusz Siembida (POL)
2000 Athens	Neil Walker (USA)	Rodolfo Falcón (CUB)	Derya Büyükunçu (TUR)
2002 Moscow	Matt Welsh (AUS)	Aaron Peirsol (USA)	Peter Marshall (USA)
2004 Indianapolis	Aaron Peirsol (USA)	Matt Welsh (AUS)	Thomas Rupprath (GER)
2006 Shanghai	Matt Welsh (AUS)	Markus Rogan (AUT)	Randall Bal (USA)
2006 Shanghai	Matt Welsh (AUS)	Markus Rogan (AUT)	Helge Meeuw (GER)
2008 Manchester	Liam Tancock (GBR)	Randall Bal (USA)	Stanislav Donets (RUS)
2010 Dubai	Stanislav Donets (RUS)	Camille Lacourt (FRA)	Aschwin Wildeboer (ESP)
2012 Istanbul	Matt Grevers (USA)	Stanislav Donets (RUS)	Guilherme Guido (BRA)
2014 Doha	Mitch Larkin (AUS)	Radosław Kawęcki (POL)	Ryosuke Irie (JPN)
2016 Windsor	Mitch Larkin (AUS)	Andrey Shabasov (RUS)	Xu Jiayu (CHN)
2018 Hangzhou	Ryan Murphy (USA)	Xu Jiayu (CHN)	Kliment Kolesnikov (RUS)
2021 Abu Dhabi	Shaine Casas (USA)	Kliment Kolesnikov (RSF)	Robert Glință (ROU)
2022 Melbourne	Ryan Murphy (USA)	Lorenzo Mora (ITA)	Isaac Cooper (AUS)
2024 Budapest	Miron Lifintsev (NAB)	Hubert Kós (HUN)	Kacper Stokowski (POL)

Rank	Nation	Gold	Silver	Bronze	Total
1	United States	7	3	2	12
2	Australia	4	2	2	8
3	Cuba	3	1	1	5
4	Russia	1	2	2	5
5	Great Britain	1	2		3
6	Neutral Athletes B	1			1
7	Poland		1	2	3
8	China		1	1	2
9	Austria		1		1
9	Italy		1		1
9	France		1		1
9	RSF		1		1
9	Hungary		1		1
14	Germany			3	3
15	Brazil			1	1
15	Spain			1	1
15	Japan			1	1
15	Romania			1	1
15	Turkey			1	1
Total		17	17	18	52

== 200 metre backstroke ==
Year	Gold	Silver	Bronze
1993 Palma de Mallorca	Tripp Schwenk (USA)	Luca Bianchin (ITA)	Stefaan Maene (BEL)
1995 Rio de Janeiro	Rodolfo Falcón (CUB)	Chris Renaud (CAN)	Tamás Deutsch (HUN)
1997 Gothenburg	Neisser Bent (CUB)	Wei Wang (CHN)	Vladimir Selkov (RUS)
1999 Hong Kong	Josh Watson (AUS)	Mark Versfeld (CAN)	Sergey Ostapchuk (RUS)
2000 Athens	Gordan Kožulj (CRO)	Brad Bridgewater (USA)	Volodymyr Nikolaychuk (UKR)
2002 Moscow	Aaron Peirsol (USA)	Marko Strahija (CRO)	Blaž Medvešek (SLO)
2004 Indianapolis	Aaron Peirsol (USA)	Matt Welsh (AUS)	Arkady Vyatchanin (RUS)
2006 Shanghai	Ryan Lochte (USA)	Markus Rogan (AUT)	Matt Welsh (AUS)
2008 Manchester	Markus Rogan (AUT)	Ryan Lochte (USA)	Stanislav Donets (RUS)
2010 Dubai	Ryan Lochte (USA)	Tyler Clary (USA)	Markus Rogan (AUT)
2012 Istanbul	Radosław Kawęcki (POL)	Ryan Lochte (USA)	Ryan Murphy (USA)
2014 Doha	Radosław Kawęcki (POL)	Ryan Lochte (USA)	Mitch Larkin (AUS)
2016 Windsor	Radosław Kawęcki (POL)	Jacob Pebley (USA)	Masaki Kaneko (JPN)
2018 Hangzhou	Evgeny Rylov (RUS)	Ryan Murphy (USA)	Radosław Kawęcki (POL)
2018 Hangzhou	Evgeny Rylov (RUS)	Ryan Murphy (USA)	Mitch Larkin (AUS)
2021 Abu Dhabi	Radosław Kawęcki (POL)	Shaine Casas (USA)	Christian Diener (GER)
2022 Melbourne	Ryan Murphy (USA)	Shaine Casas (USA)	Lorenzo Mora (ITA)
2024 Budapest	Hubert Kós (HUN)	Lorenzo Mora (ITA)	Mewen Tomac (FRA)

Rank	Nation	Gold	Silver	Bronze	Total
1	United States	6	9	1	16
2	Poland	4		1	5
3	Cuba	2			2
4	Australia	1	1	3	5
5	Austria	1	1	1	3
6	Croatia	1	1		2
7	Russia	1		4	5
8	Hungary	1		1	2
9	Italy		2	1	3
10	Canada		2		2
11	China		1		1
12	Japan			1	1
12	Belgium			1	1
12	Germany			1	1
12	Slovenia			1	1
12	Ukraine			1	1
12	France			1	1
Total		17	17	18	52

== 50 metre breaststroke ==
Year	Gold	Silver	Bronze
1999 Hong Kong	Dmytri Kraevskyy (UKR)	Patrik Isaksson (SWE)	Remo Lütolf (SUI)
2000 Athens	Mark Warnecke (GER)	Brendon Dedekind (RSA)	Oleh Lisohor (UKR)
2002 Moscow	Oleh Lisohor (UKR)	José Couto (POR)	Eduardo Fischer (BRA)
2004 Indianapolis	Brendan Hansen (USA)	Brenton Rickard (AUS)	Stefan Nystrand (SWE)
2006 Shanghai	Oleh Lisohor (UKR)	Alessandro Terrin (ITA)	Chris Cook (GBR)
2008 Manchester	Oleh Lisohor (UKR)	Mark Gangloff (USA)	Cameron van der Burgh (RSA)
2010 Dubai	Felipe França Silva (BRA)	Cameron van der Burgh (RSA)	Aleksander Hetland (NOR)
2012 Istanbul	Aleksander Hetland (NOR)	Damir Dugonjič (SLO)	Florent Manaudou (FRA)
2014 Doha	Felipe França Silva (BRA)	Adam Peaty (GBR); Cameron van der Burgh (RSA)	none awarded
2016 Windsor	Cameron van der Burgh (RSA)	Peter John Stevens (SLO)	Felipe Lima (BRA)
2018 Hangzhou	Cameron van der Burgh (RSA)	Ilya Shymanovich (BLR)	Felipe Lima (BRA)
2021 Abu Dhabi	Nic Fink (USA)	Nicolò Martinenghi (ITA)	João Gomes Júnior (BRA)
2022 Melbourne	Nic Fink (USA)	Nicolò Martinenghi (ITA)	Simone Cerasuolo (ITA)
2024 Budapest	Qin Haiyang (CHN)	Emre Sakçı (TUR)	Kirill Prigoda (NAB)

Rank	Nation	Gold	Silver	Bronze	Total
1	Ukraine	4		1	5
2	United States	3	1		4
3	South Africa	2	3	1	6
4	Brazil	2		4	6
5	Norway	1		1	2
6	Germany	1			1
6	China	1			1
8	Italy		3	1	4
9	Slovenia		2		2
10	Sweden		1	1	2
10	Great Britain		1	1	2
12	Australia		1		1
12	Belarus		1		1
12	Portugal		1		1
12	Turkey		1		1
16	France			1	1
16	Switzerland			1	1
16	Neutral Athletes B			1	1
Total		14	15	13	42

== 100 metre breaststroke ==
Year	Gold	Silver	Bronze
1993 Palma de Mallorca	Phil Rogers (AUS)	Ron Dekker (NED)	Seth Van Neerden (USA)
1995 Rio de Janeiro	Mark Warnecke (GER)	Paul Kent (NZL)	Stanislav Lopukhov (RUS)
1997 Gothenburg	Patrik Isaksson (SWE)	Stanislav Lopukhov (RUS)	Jens Kruppa (GER)
1999 Hong Kong	Patrik Isaksson (SWE)	Domenico Fioravanti (ITA)	Morgan Knabe (CAN)
2000 Athens	Roman Sloudnov (RUS)	Zhu Yi (CHN)	Roman Ivanovsky (RUS)
2002 Moscow	Oleh Lisohor (UKR)	Kosuke Kitajima (JPN)	Jarno Pihlava (FIN)
2004 Indianapolis	Brendan Hansen (USA)	Brenton Rickard (AUS)	Vladislav Polyakov (KAZ)
2006 Shanghai	Oleh Lisohor (UKR)	Brenton Rickard (AUS)	Alexander Dale Oen (NOR)
2008 Manchester	Ihor Borysyk (UKR)	Cameron van der Burgh (RSA)	Oleh Lisohor (UKR)
2010 Dubai	Cameron van der Burgh (RSA)	Fabio Scozzoli (ITA)	Felipe França Silva (BRA)
2012 Istanbul	Fabio Scozzoli (ITA)	Damir Dugonjič (SLO)	Kevin Cordes (USA)
2014 Doha	Felipe França Silva (BRA)	Adam Peaty (GBR)	Giacomo Perez-Dortona (FRA)
2016 Windsor	Marco Koch (GER)	Vladimir Morozov (RUS)	Fabio Scozzoli (ITA)
2018 Hangzhou	Cameron van der Burgh (RSA)	Ilya Shymanovich (BLR)	Yasuhiro Koseki (JPN)
2021 Abu Dhabi	Ilya Shymanovich (BLR)	Nicolò Martinenghi (ITA)	Nic Fink (USA)
2022 Melbourne	Nic Fink (USA)	Nicolo Martinenghi (ITA)	Adam Peaty (GBR)
2024 Budapest	Qin Haiyang (CHN)	Kirill Prigoda (NAB)	Ilya Shymanovich (NAA)

Rank	Nation	Gold	Silver	Bronze	Total
1	Ukraine	3		1	4
2	South Africa	2	1		3
3	United States	2		3	5
4	Germany	2		1	3
5	Sweden	2			2
6	Italy	1	4	1	6
7	Russia	1	2	2	5
8	Australia	1	2		3
9	Belarus	1	1		2
9	China	1	1		2
11	Brazil	1		1	2
12	Japan		1	1	2
12	Great Britain		1	1	2
14	Netherlands		1		1
14	New Zealand		1		1
14	Slovenia		1		1
14	Neutral Athletes B		1		1
18	Canada			1	1
18	Finland			1	1
18	France			1	1
18	Kazakhstan			1	1
18	Norway			1	1
18	Neutral Athletes A			1	1
Total		17	17	17	51

== 200 metre breaststroke ==
Year	Gold	Silver	Bronze
1993 Palma de Mallorca	Nick Gillingham (GBR)	Phil Rogers (AUS)	Eric Wunderlich (USA)
1995 Rio de Janeiro	Wang Yiwu (CHN)	Ryan Mitchell (AUS)	Jean-Lionel Rey (FRA)
1997 Gothenburg	Aleksandr Gukov (BLR)	Andrey Korneyev (RUS)	Jens Kruppa (GER)
1999 Hong Kong	Phil Rogers (AUS)	Ryan Mitchell (AUS)	Dmitri Komornikov (RUS)
2000 Athens	Roman Sloudnov (RUS)	Terence Parkin (RSA)	Andrei Ivanov (RUS)
2002 Moscow	Jim Piper (AUS)	David Denniston (USA)	Jarno Pihlava (FIN)
2004 Indianapolis	Brendan Hansen (USA)	Brenton Rickard (AUS)	Vladislav Polyakov (KAZ)
2006 Shanghai	Vladislav Polyakov (KAZ)	Brenton Rickard (AUS)	Yevgeniy Ryzhkov (KAZ)
2008 Manchester	Kristopher Gilchrist (GBR)	Ihor Borysyk (UKR)	William Diering (RSA)
2010 Dubai	Naoya Tomita (JPN)	Dániel Gyurta (HUN)	Brenton Rickard (AUS)
2012 Istanbul	Dániel Gyurta (HUN)	Michael Jamieson (GBR)	Viatcheslav Sinkevich (RUS)
2014 Doha	Dániel Gyurta (HUN)	Marco Koch (GER)	Kirill Prigoda (RUS)
2016 Windsor	Marco Koch (GER)	Andrew Willis (GBR)	Mikhail Dorinov (RUS)
2018 Hangzhou	Kirill Prigoda (RUS)	Qin Haiyang (CHN)	Marco Koch (GER)
2021 Abu Dhabi	Nic Fink (USA)	Arno Kamminga (NED)	Will Licon (USA)
2022 Melbourne	Daiya Seto (JPN)	Nic Fink (USA)	Qin Haiyang (CHN)
2024 Budapest	Carles Coll (ESP)	Kirill Prigoda (NAB)	Yamato Fukasawa (JPN)

Rank	Nation	Gold	Silver	Bronze	Total
1	Australia	2	5	1	8
2	United States	2	2	2	6
3	Great Britain	2	2		4
4	Russia	2	1	5	8
5	Hungary	2	1		3
6	Japan	2		1	3
7	Germany	1	1	2	4
8	China	1	1	1	3
9	Kazakhstan	1		2	3
10	Belarus	1			1
10	Spain	1			1
12	South Africa		1	1	2
13	Netherlands		1		1
13	Ukraine		1		1
13	Neutral Athletes B		1		1
16	Finland			1	1
16	France			1	1
Total		17	17	17	51

== 50 metre butterfly ==
Year	Gold	Silver	Bronze
1999 Hong Kong	Mark Foster (GBR)	Zhang Qiang (CHN)	Joris Keizer (NED)
2000 Athens	Mark Foster (GBR)	Neil Walker (USA)	Sabir Muhammad (USA)
2002 Moscow	Geoff Huegill (AUS)	Adam Pine (AUS)	Mark Foster (GBR)
2004 Indianapolis	Ian Crocker (USA)	Mark Foster (GBR)	Duje Draganja (CRO)
2006 Shanghai	Matt Welsh (AUS)	Serhiy Breus (UKR)	Kaio de Almeida (BRA)
2008 Manchester	Adam Pine (AUS)	Serhiy Breus (UKR)	Evgeny Korotyshkin (RUS)
2010 Dubai	Albert Subirats (VEN)	Andriy Hovorov (UKR)	Steffen Deibler (GER)
2012 Istanbul	Nicholas Santos (BRA)	Chad le Clos (RSA)	Tom Shields (USA)
2014 Doha	Chad le Clos (RSA)	Nicholas Santos (BRA)	Andriy Hovorov (UKR)
2016 Windsor	Chad le Clos (RSA)	Tom Shields (USA)	David Morgan (AUS)
2018 Hangzhou	Nicholas Santos (BRA)	Chad le Clos (RSA)	Dylan Carter (TTO)
2021 Abu Dhabi	Nicholas Santos (BRA)	Dylan Carter (TTO)	Matteo Rivolta (ITA)
2022 Melbourne	Nicholas Santos (BRA)	Noè Ponti (SUI)	Szebasztián Szabó (HUN)
2024 Budapest	Noè Ponti (SUI)	Ilya Kharun (CAN)	Nyls Korstanje (NED)

Rank	Nation	Gold	Silver	Bronze	Total
1	Brazil	4	1	1	6
2	Australia	3	1	1	5
3	South Africa	2	2		4
4	Great Britain	2	1	1	4
5	United States	1	2	2	5
6	Switzerland	1	1		2
7	Venezuela	1			1
8	Ukraine		3	1	4
9	Trinidad and Tobago		1	1	2
10	China		1		1
10	Canada		1		1
12	Netherlands			2	2
13	Croatia			1	1
13	Germany			1	1
13	Hungary			1	1
13	Italy			1	1
13	Russia			1	1
Total		14	14	14	42

== 100 metre butterfly ==
Year	Gold	Silver	Bronze
1993 Palma de Mallorca	Miloš Milošević (CRO)	Mark Henderson (USA)	Rafał Szukała (POL)
1995 Rio de Janeiro	Scott Miller (AUS)	Denis Pimankov (RUS)	Michael Klim (AUS)
1997 Gothenburg	Lars Frölander (SWE)	Geoff Huegill (AUS)	Michael Klim (AUS)
1999 Hong Kong	Lars Frölander (SWE)	Michael Klim (AUS)	James Hickman (GBR)
2000 Athens	Lars Frölander (SWE)	James Hickman (GBR)	Denys Sylantyev (UKR)
2002 Moscow	Geoff Huegill (AUS)	Adam Pine (AUS)	Igor Marchenko (RUS)
2004 Indianapolis	Ian Crocker (USA)	James Hickman (GBR)	Peter Mankoč (SLO)
2006 Shanghai	Kaio de Almeida (BRA)	Albert Subirats (VEN)	Jayme Cramer (USA)
2008 Manchester	Peter Mankoč (SLO)	Adam Pine (AUS)	Nikolay Skvortsov (RUS)
2010 Dubai	Yevgeny Korotyshkin (RUS)	Albert Subirats (VEN)	Kaio de Almeida (BRA)
2012 Istanbul	Chad le Clos (RSA)	Tom Shields (USA)	Ryan Lochte (USA)
2014 Doha	Chad le Clos (RSA)	Tom Shields (USA)	Tommaso D'Orsogna (AUS)
2016 Windsor	Chad le Clos (RSA)	Tom Shields (USA)	David Morgan (AUS)
2018 Hangzhou	Chad le Clos (RSA)	Caeleb Dressel (USA)	Li Zhuhao (CHN)
2021 Abu Dhabi	Matteo Rivolta (ITA)	Chad le Clos (RSA)	Andrey Minakov (RSF)
2022 Melbourne	Chad le Clos (RSA)	Ilya Kharun (CAN)	Marius Kusch (GER)
2024 Budapest	Noè Ponti (SUI)	Maxime Grousset (FRA)	Matthew Temple (AUS)

Rank	Nation	Gold	Silver	Bronze	Total
1	South Africa	5	1		6
2	Sweden	3			3
3	Australia	2	4	5	11
4	United States	1	5	2	8
5	Russia	1	1	2	4
6	Brazil	1		1	2
6	Slovenia	1		1	2
8	Croatia	1			1
8	Italy	1			1
8	Switzerland	1			1
11	Great Britain		2	1	3
12	Venezuela		2		2
13	Canada		1		1
13	France		1		1
15	China			1	1
15	Germany			1	1
15	Poland			1	1
15	RSF			1	1
15	Ukraine			1	1
Total		17	17	17	51

== 200 metre butterfly ==
Year	Gold	Silver	Bronze
1993 Palma de Mallorca	Franck Esposito (FRA)	Christian Keller (GER)	Chris-Carol Bremer (GER)
1995 Rio de Janeiro	Scott Goodman (AUS)	Scott Miller (AUS)	Chris-Carol Bremer (GER)
1997 Gothenburg	James Hickman (GBR)	Denys Sylantyev (UKR)	Scott Goodman (AUS)
1999 Hong Kong	James Hickman (GBR)	Takashi Yamamoto (JPN)	Denys Sylantyev (UKR)
2000 Athens	James Hickman (GBR)	Shamek Pietucha (CAN)	Anatoly Polyakov (RUS)
2002 Moscow	James Hickman (GBR)	Justin Norris (AUS)	Ioan Gherghel (ROM)
2004 Indianapolis	James Hickman (GBR)	Ioan Gherghel (ROM)	Wu Peng (CHN)
2006 Shanghai	Wu Peng (CHN)	Moss Burmester (NZL)	Nikolay Skvortsov (RUS)
2008 Manchester	Moss Burmester (NZL)	Nikolay Skvortsov (RUS)	Paweł Korzeniowski (POL)
2010 Dubai	Chad le Clos (RSA)	Kaio de Almeida (BRA)	László Cseh (HUN)
2012 Istanbul	Kazuya Kaneda (JPN)	László Cseh (HUN)	Nikolay Skvortsov (RUS)
2014 Doha	Chad le Clos (RSA)	Daiya Seto (JPN)	Paweł Korzeniowski (POL)
2016 Windsor	Chad le Clos (RSA)	Tom Shields (USA)	Daiya Seto (JPN)
2018 Hangzhou	Daiya Seto (JPN)	Chad le Clos (RSA)	Li Zhuhao (CHN)
2021 Abu Dhabi	Alberto Razzetti (ITA)	Noè Ponti (SUI)	Chad le Clos (RSA)
2022 Melbourne	Chad le Clos (RSA)	Daiya Seto (JPN)	Noè Ponti (SUI)
2024 Budapest	Ilya Kharun (CAN)	Alberto Razzetti (ITA)	Krzysztof Chmielewski (POL)

Rank	Nation	Gold	Silver	Bronze	Total
1	Great Britain	5			5
2	South Africa	4	1	1	6
3	Japan	2	3	1	6
4	Australia	1	2	1	4
5	New Zealand	1	1		2
5	Italy	1	1		2
5	Canada	1	1		2
8	China	1		2	3
9	France	1			1
10	Russia		1	3	4
11	Germany		1	2	3
12	Hungary		1	1	2
12	Romania		1	1	2
12	Switzerland		1	1	2
12	Ukraine		1	1	2
16	Brazil		1		1
16	United States		1		1
18	Poland			3	3
Total		17	17	17	51

== 100 metre individual medley ==
Year	Gold	Silver	Bronze
1999 Hong Kong	Jani Sievinen (FIN)	Matthew Dunn (AUS)	Jacob Andersen (DEN)
2000 Athens	Neil Walker (USA)	Jani Sievinen (FIN)	James Hickman (GBR)
2002 Moscow	Peter Mankoč (SLO)	Jani Sievinen (FIN)	Jacob Andersen (DEN)
2004 Indianapolis	Peter Mankoč (SLO)	Thomas Rupprath (GER)	Thiago Pereira (BRA)
2006 Shanghai	Ryk Neethling (RSA)	Peter Mankoč (SLO)	Stefan Nystrand (SWE)
2008 Manchester	Ryan Lochte (USA)	Peter Mankoč (SLO)	Liam Tancock (GBR)
2010 Dubai	Ryan Lochte (USA)	Markus Deibler (GER)	Sergey Fesikov (RUS)
2012 Istanbul	Ryan Lochte (USA)	Kenneth To (AUS)	George Bovell (TRI)
2014 Doha	Markus Deibler (GER)	Vladimir Morozov (RUS)	Ryan Lochte (USA)
2016 Windsor	Michael Andrew (USA)	Daiya Seto (JPN)	Shinri Shioura (JPN)
2018 Hangzhou	Kliment Kolesnikov (RUS)	Marco Orsi (ITA)	Michael Andrew (USA)
2021 Abu Dhabi	Kliment Kolesnikov (RSF)	Tomoe Hvas (NOR)	Thomas Ceccon (ITA)
2022 Melbourne	Thomas Ceccon (ITA)	Javier Acevedo (CAN)	Finlay Knox (CAN)
2024 Budapest	Noè Ponti (SUI)	Bernhard Reitshammer (AUT)	Caio Pumputis (BRA)

Rank	Nation	Gold	Silver	Bronze	Total
1	United States	5		2	7
2	Slovenia	2	2		4
3	Finland	1	2		3
3	Germany	1	2		3
5	Italy	1	1	1	3
5	Russia	1	1	1	3
7	RSF	1			1
7	South Africa	1			1
7	Switzerland	1			1
10	Australia		2		2
11	Canada		1	1	2
11	Japan		1	1	2
13	Norway		1		1
13	Austria		1		1
15	Denmark			2	2
15	Great Britain			2	2
15	Brazil			2	2
18	Sweden			1	1
18	Trinidad and Tobago			1	1
Total		14	14	14	42

== 200 metre individual medley ==
Year	Gold	Silver	Bronze
1993 Palma de Mallorca	Christian Keller (GER)	Fraser Walker (GBR)	Curtis Myden (CAN)
1995 Rio de Janeiro	Matthew Dunn (AUS)	Curtis Myden (CAN)	Marcin Maliński (POL)
1997 Gothenburg	Matthew Dunn (AUS)	Christian Keller (GER)	Ron Karnaugh (USA)
1999 Hong Kong	Matthew Dunn (AUS)	James Hickman (GBR)	Marcel Wouda (NED)
2000 Athens	Jani Sievinen (FIN)	James Hickman (GBR)	Massimiliano Rosolino (ITA)
2002 Moscow	Jani Sievinen (FIN)	Peter Mankoč (SLO)	Tom Wilkens (USA)
2004 Indianapolis	Thiago Pereira (BRA)	Ryan Lochte (USA)	Oussama Mellouli (TUN)
2006 Shanghai	Ryan Lochte (USA)	Markus Rogan (AUT)	Igor Berezutskiy (RUS)
2008 Manchester	Ryan Lochte (USA)	Liam Tancock (GBR)	James Goddard (GBR)
2010 Dubai	Ryan Lochte (USA)	Markus Rogan (AUT)	Tyler Clary (USA)
2012 Istanbul	Ryan Lochte (USA)	Daiya Seto (JPN)	László Cseh (HUN)
2014 Doha	Kosuke Hagino (JPN)	Ryan Lochte (USA)	Daiya Seto (JPN)
2016 Windsor	Wang Shun (CHN)	Philip Heintz (GER)	Daiya Seto (JPN)
2018 Hangzhou	Wang Shun (CHN)	Josh Prenot (USA)	Hiromasa Fujimori (JPN)
2021 Abu Dhabi	Daiya Seto (JPN)	Carson Foster (USA)	Alberto Razzetti (ITA)
2022 Melbourne	Matthew Sates (RSA)	Carson Foster (USA)	Finlay Knox (CAN)
2024 Budapest	Shaine Casas (USA)	Alberto Razzetti (ITA)	Finlay Knox (CAN)

Rank	Nation	Gold	Silver	Bronze	Total
1	United States	5	5	3	13
2	Australia	3			3
3	Japan	2	1	3	6
4	China	2			2
4	Finland	2			2
6	Germany	1	2		3
7	Brazil	1			1
7	South Africa	1			1
9	Great Britain		4	1	5
10	Austria		2		2
11	Canada		1	3	4
12	Italy		1	2	3
13	Slovenia		1		1
14	Hungary			1	1
14	Poland			1	1
14	Netherlands			1	1
14	Russia			1	1
14	Tunisia			1	1
Total		17	17	17	51

== 400 metre individual medley ==
Year	Gold	Silver	Bronze
1993 Palma de Mallorca	Curtis Myden (CAN)	Serghei Mariniuc (MDA)	Petteri Lehtinen (FIN)
1995 Rio de Janeiro	Matthew Dunn (AUS)	Curtis Myden (CAN)	Marcin Maliński (POL)
1997 Gothenburg	Matthew Dunn (AUS)	Xie Xufeng (CHN)	Christian Keller (GER)
1999 Hong Kong	Matthew Dunn (AUS)	Marcel Wouda (NED)	Frederik Hviid (ESP)
2000 Athens	Jani Sievinen (FIN)	Terence Parkin (RSA)	Michael Halika (ISR)
2002 Moscow	Tom Wilkens (USA)	Brian Johns (CAN)	Jacob Carstensen (DEN)
2004 Indianapolis	Oussama Mellouli (TUN)	Robin Francis (GBR)	Eric Shanteau (USA)
2006 Shanghai	Ryan Lochte (USA)	Luca Marin (ITA)	Igor Berezutskiy (RUS)
2008 Manchester	Ryan Lochte (USA)	Robert Margalis (USA)	Dinko Jukic (AUT)
2010 Dubai	Ryan Lochte (USA)	Oussama Mellouli (TUN)	Tyler Clary (USA)
2012 Istanbul	Daiya Seto (JPN)	László Cseh (HUN)	Dávid Verrasztó (HUN)
2014 Doha	Daiya Seto (JPN)	Kosuke Hagino (JPN)	Dávid Verrasztó (HUN)
2016 Windsor	Daiya Seto (JPN)	Max Litchfield (GBR)	Dávid Verrasztó (HUN)
2018 Hangzhou	Daiya Seto (JPN)	Thomas Fraser-Holmes (AUS)	Brandonn Almeida (BRA)
2021 Abu Dhabi	Daiya Seto (JPN)	Ilya Borodin (RSF)	Carson Foster (USA)
2022 Melbourne	Daiya Seto (JPN)	Carson Foster (USA)	Matthew Sates (RSA)
2024 Budapest	Ilya Borodin (NAB)	Carson Foster (USA)	Alberto Razzetti (ITA)

Rank	Nation	Gold	Silver	Bronze	Total
1	Japan	6	1		7
2	United States	4	3	3	10
3	Australia	3	1		4
4	Canada	1	2		3
5	Tunisia	1	1		2
6	Finland	1		1	2
7	Neutral Athletes B	1			1
8	Great Britain		2		2
9	Hungary		1	3	4
10	South Africa		1	1	2
10	Italy		1	1	2
12	China		1		1
12	Moldova		1		1
12	Netherlands		1		1
12	RSF		1		1
16	Brazil			1	1
16	Denmark			1	1
16	Germany			1	1
16	Austria			1	1
16	Israel			1	1
16	Poland			1	1
16	Russia			1	1
16	Spain			1	1
Total		17	17	17	51

== 4 × 50 metre freestyle relay ==
Year	Gold	Silver	Bronze
2014 Doha	Russia (RUS); Vladimir Morozov; Evgeny Sedov; Oleg Tikhobaev; Sergey Fesikov	United States (USA); Josh Schneider; Tom Shields; Jimmy Feigen; Ryan Lochte	Italy (ITA); Luca Dotto; Marco Orsi; Filippo Magnini; Marco Belotti
2016 Windsor	Russia (RUS); Aleksei Brianskiy; Nikita Lobintsev; Aleksandr Popkov; Vladimir Morozov	United States (USA); Paul Powers; Blake Pieroni; Michael Chadwick; Tom Shields	Japan (JPN); Kosuke Matsui; Kenta Ito; Shinri Shioura; Junya Koga
2018 Hangzhou	United States (USA); Caeleb Dressel; Ryan Held; Jack Conger; Michael Chadwick	Russia (RUS); Vladimir Morozov; Evgeny Sedov; Ivan Kuzmenko; Evgeny Rylov	Italy (ITA); Santo Condorelli; Andrea Vergani; Lorenzo Zazzeri; Alessandro Miressi
2021 Abu Dhabi	Italy (ITA); Leonardo Deplano; Lorenzo Zazzeri; Manuel Frigo; Alessandro Miressi	Russian Swimming Federation (RSF); Andrey Minakov; Vladimir Morozov; Vladislav Grinev; Aleksandr Shchegolev	Netherlands (NED); Jesse Puts; Stan Pijnenburg; Kenzo Simons; Thom de Boer
2022 Melbourne	Australia (AUS); Isaac Cooper; Matthew Temple; Flynn Southam; Kyle Chalmers	Italy (ITA); Alessandro Miressi; Leonardo Deplano; Thomas Ceccon; Manuel Frigo	Netherlands (NED); Kenzo Simons; Nyls Korstanje; Stan Pijnenburg; Thom de Boer

Rank	Nation	Gold	Silver	Bronze	Total
1	Russia	2	1		3
2	United States	1	2		3
3	Italy	1	1	2	4
4	Australia	1			1
5	RSF		1		1
6	Netherlands			2	2
7	Japan			1	1
Total		5	5	5	15

== 4 × 100 metre freestyle relay ==
Year	Gold	Silver	Bronze
1993 Palma de Mallorca	Brazil (BRA); Fernando Scherer; Teófilo Ferreira; Gustavo Borges; José Carlos Souza	United States (USA); David Fox; Seth Pepper; Jon Olsen; Mark Henderson	Russia (RUS); Roman Shegolev; Vladislav Kulikov; Vladimir Predkin; Yury Mukhin
1995 Rio de Janeiro	Brazil (BRA); Fernando Scherer; Alexandre Massura; André Cordeiro; Gustavo Borges	Australia (AUS); Brett Hawke; Michael Klim; Richard Upton; Matthew Dunn	Romania (ROM); Ivan Nicolae; Răzvan Petcu; Alexandru Ioanavici; Nicolae Butacu
1997 Gothenburg	Germany (GER); Lars Conrad; Christian Tröger; Alexander Lüderitz; Aimo Heilmann	Sweden (SWE); Fredrik Letzler; Anders Holmertz; Ola Fagerstrand; Lars Frölander	Australia (AUS); Michael Klim; Scott Logan; Richard Upton; Jeffrey English
1999 Hong Kong	Australia (AUS); Chris Fydler; Todd Pearson; Ian Thorpe; Michael Klim	Netherlands (NED); Mark Veens; Johan Kenkhuis; Marcel Wouda; Pieter van den Hoogenband	Sweden (SWE); Dan Lindström; Lars Frölander; Mattias Ohlin; Daniel Carlsson
2000 Athens	Sweden (SWE); Johan Nyström; Lars Frölander; Mattias Ohlin; Stefan Nystrand	United States (USA); Scott Tucker; Josh Davis; Sabir Muhammad; Neil Walker	Germany (GER); Mitja Zastrow; Stefan Herbst; Christian Tröger; Stephan Kunzelmann
2002 Moscow	United States (USA); Scott Tucker; Peter Marshall; Jason Lezak; Klete Keller	Sweden (SWE); Stefan Nystrand; Lars Frölander; Mattias Ohlin; Eric la Fleur	Russia (RUS); Leonid Khokhlov; Alexander Popov; Denis Pimankov; Andrey Kapralov
2004 Indianapolis	United States (USA); Nicholas Brunelli; Neil Walker; Nate Dusing; Jason Lezak	Brazil (BRA); César Cielo Filho; Thiago Pereira; Christiano Santos; Nicholas Santos	Canada (CAN); Mike Mintenko; Matthew Rose; Adam Sioui; Rick Say
2006 Shanghai	Italy (ITA); Alessandro Calvi; Klaus Lanzarini; Christian Galenda; Filippo Magnini	Sweden (SWE); Marcus Piehl; Lars Frölander; Jonas Tilly; Stefan Nystrand	United States (USA); Nicholas Brunelli; Ryan Lochte; Matt Grevers; Jason Lezak
2008 Manchester	United States (USA); Ryan Lochte; Bryan Lundquist; Nathan Adrian; Doug Van Wie	Netherlands (NED); Robert Lijesen; Bas van Velthoven; Mitja Zastrow; Robin van Aggele	Sweden (SWE); Petter Stymne; Stefan Nystrand; Lars Frölander; Marcus Piehl
2010 Dubai	France (FRA); Alain Bernard; Frédérick Bousquet; Fabien Gilot; Yannick Agnel	Russia (RUS); Yevgeny Lagunov; Sergey Fesikov; Nikita Lobintsev; Danila Izotov	Brazil (BRA); Nicholas Santos; César Cielo Filho; Marcelo Chierighini; Nicolas Oliveira
2012 Istanbul	United States (USA); Anthony Ervin; Ryan Lochte; Jimmy Feigen; Matt Grevers	Italy (ITA); Luca Dotto; Marco Orsi; Michele Santucci; Filippo Magnini	Australia (AUS); Tommaso D'Orsogna; Kyle Richardson; Travis Mahoney; Kenneth To
2014 Doha	France (FRA); Clément Mignon; Fabien Gilot; Florent Manaudou; Mehdy Metella	Russia (RUS); Vladimir Morozov; Sergey Fesikov; Danila Izotov; Mikhail Polischuk	United States (USA); Jimmy Feigen; Matt Grevers; Ryan Lochte; Tom Shields
2016 Windsor	Russia (RUS); Nikita Lobintsev; Mikhail Vekovishchev; Vladimir Morozov; Aleksandr Popkov	France (FRA); Clément Mignon; Jérémy Stravius; Jordan Pothain; Mehdy Metella	Australia (AUS); Brayden McCarthy; Daniel Smith; David Morgan; Tommaso D'Orsogna
2016 Windsor	Russia (RUS); Nikita Lobintsev; Mikhail Vekovishchev; Vladimir Morozov; Aleksandr Popkov	France (FRA); Clément Mignon; Jérémy Stravius; Jordan Pothain; Mehdy Metella	United States (USA); Michael Chadwick; Tom Shields; Paul Powers; Blake Pieroni
2018 Hangzhou	United States (USA); Caeleb Dressel; Blake Pieroni; Michael Chadwick; Ryan Held	Russia (RUS); Vladislav Grinev; Sergey Fesikov; Vladimir Morozov; Kliment Kolesnikov	Brazil (BRA); Matheus Santana; Marcelo Chierighini; César Cielo; Breno Correia
2021 Abu Dhabi	Russian Swimming Federation (RSF); Kliment Kolesnikov; Andrey Minakov; Vladislav Grinev; Aleksandr Shchegolev	Italy (ITA); Alessandro Miressi; Thomas Ceccon; Leonardo Deplano; Lorenzo Zazzeri	United States (USA); Ryan Held; Hunter Tapp; Shaine Casas; Zach Apple
2022 Melbourne	Italy (ITA); Alessandro Miressi; Paolo Conte Bonin; Leonardo Deplano; Thomas Ceccon	Australia (AUS); Flynn Southam; Matthew Temple; Thomas Neill; Kyle Chalmers	United States (USA); Drew Kibler; Shaine Casas; Carson Foster; Kieran Smith
2024 Budapest	United States (USA); Jack Alexy; Luke Hobson; Kieran Smith; Chris Guiliano	Italy (ITA); Alessandro Miressi; Leonardo Deplano; Lorenzo Zazzeri; Manuel Frigo	Poland (POL); Kamil Sieradzki; Jakub Majerski; Ksawery Masiuk; Kacper Stokowski

Rank	Nation	Gold	Silver	Bronze	Total
1	United States	6	2	5	13
2	Italy	2	3		5
3	Brazil	2	1	2	5
4	France	2	1		3
5	Sweden	1	3	2	6
5	Russia	1	3	2	6
7	Australia	1	2	3	6
8	Germany	1		1	2
9	RSF	1			1
10	Netherlands		2		2
11	Canada			1	1
11	Romania			1	1
11	Poland			1	1
Total		17	17	18	52

== 4 × 200 metre freestyle relay ==
Year	Gold	Silver	Bronze
1993 Palma de Mallorca	Sweden (SWE); Lars Frölander; Tommy Werner; Anders Holmertz; Christer Wallin	Germany (GER); Christian Tröger; Christian Keller; Chris-Carol Bremer; Jörg Hoffmann	Brazil (BRA); Gustavo Borges; Teófilo Ferreira; José Carlos Souza; Cassiano Leal
1995 Rio de Janeiro	Australia (AUS); Michael Klim; Matthew Dunn; Malcolm Allen; Daniel Kowalski	Germany (GER); Chris-Carol Bremer; Steffen Zesner; Torsten Spanneberg; Jörg Hoffmann	Brazil (BRA); Cassiano Leal; Fernando Saez; Teófilo Ferreira; Gustavo Borges
1997 Gothenburg	Australia (AUS); Michael Klim; Grant Hackett; William Kirby; Matthew Dunn	Sweden (SWE); Anders Holmertz; Lars Frölander; Fredrik Letzler; Anders Lyrbing	Great Britain (GBR); Paul Palmer; Andrew Clayton; Mark Stevens; James Salter
1999 Hong Kong	Netherlands (NED); Pieter van den Hoogenband; Johan Kenkhuis; Martijn Zuijdweg; Marcel Wouda	Great Britain (GBR); Gavin Meadows; Sion Brinn; Paul Palmer; Edward Sinclair	Canada (CAN); Mark Johnston; Brian Johns; Rick Say; Yannick Lupien
2000 Athens	United States (USA); Josh Davis; Neil Walker; Scott Tucker; Chad Carvin	Great Britain (GBR); Edward Sinclair; Marc Spackman; Paul Palmer; James Salter	Russia (RUS); Denis Pimankov; Anatoly Polyakov; Dmitri Chernyshov; Andrey Kapralov
2002 Moscow	Australia (AUS); Todd Pearson; Ray Hass; Leon Dunne; Grant Hackett	Russia (RUS); Denis Rodkin; Yuri Prilukov; Ilya Nikitin; Andrey Kapralov	United States (USA); Chad Carvin; Erik Vendt; Scott Tucker; Klete Keller
2004 Indianapolis	United States (USA); Ryan Lochte; Chad Carvin; Dan Ketchum; Justin Mortimer	Australia (AUS); Nicholas Sprenger; Andrew Mewing; Brendan Huges; Joshua Krogh	Brazil (BRA); Rodrigo Castro; Thiago Pereira; Rafael Mosca; Lucas Salatta
2006 Shanghai	Italy (ITA); Massimiliano Rosolino; Matteo Pelliciari; Nicola Cassio; Filippo Magnini	Australia (AUS); Andrew Mewing; Louis Paul; Grant Brits; Nicholas Ffrost	United States (USA); Ryan Lochte; Nicholas Brunelli; Jayme Cramer; Larsen Jensen
2008 Manchester	Australia (AUS); Kirk Palmer; Grant Brits; Nicholas Sprenger; Kenrick Monk	Great Britain (GBR); Robert Renwick; David Carry; Andrew Hunter; Ross Davenport	Italy (ITA); Emiliano Brembilla; Massimiliano Rosolino; Nicola Cassio; Filippo Magnini
2010 Dubai	Russia (RUS); Nikita Lobintsev; Danila Izotov; Yevgeny Lagunov; Alexander Sukhorukov	United States (USA); Peter Vanderkaay; Ryan Lochte; Garrett Weber-Gale; Ricky Berens	France (FRA); Yannick Agnel; Fabien Gilot; Clément Lefert; Jérémy Stravius
2012 Istanbul	United States (USA); Ryan Lochte; Conor Dwyer; Michael Klueh; Matt McLean	Australia (AUS); Tommaso D'Orsogna; Jarrod Killey; Kyle Richardson; Robert Hurley	Germany (GER); Paul Biedermann; Dimitri Colupaev; Christoph Fildebrandt; Yannick Lebherz
2014 Doha	United States (USA); Conor Dwyer; Ryan Lochte; Matt McLean; Tyler Clary	Italy (ITA); Andrea Mitchell D'Arrigo; Marco Belotti; Nicolangelo Di Fabio; Filippo Magnini	Russia (RUS); Mikhail Polischuk; Danila Izotov; Artem Lobuzov; Viacheslav Andrusenko
2016 Windsor	Russia (RUS); Mikhail Dovgalyuk; Mikhail Vekovishchev; Artem Lobuzov; Aleksandr Krasnykh	United States (USA); Blake Pieroni; Jacob Pebley; Pace Clark; Zane Grothe	Japan (JPN); Yuki Kobori; Daiya Seto; Tsubasa Amai; Katsuhiro Matsumoto
2018 Hangzhou	Brazil (BRA); Luiz Altamir Melo; Fernando Scheffer; Leonardo Coelho Santos; Breno Correia	Russia (RUS); Martin Malyutin; Mikhail Vekovishchev; Ivan Girev; Aleksandr Krasnykh	China (CHN); Ji Xinjie; Xu Jiayu; Sun Yang; Wang Shun
2021 Abu Dhabi	United States (USA); Kieran Smith; Trenton Julian; Carson Foster; Ryan Held	Russian Swimming Federation (RSF); Vladislav Grinev; Aleksandr Shchegolev; Mikhail Vekovishchev; Ivan Giryov	Brazil (BRA); Fernando Scheffer; Murilo Sartori; Kaique Alves; Breno Correia
2022 Melbourne	United States (USA); Kieran Smith; Carson Foster; Trenton Julian; Drew Kibler	Australia (AUS); Thomas Neill; Kyle Chalmers; Flynn Southam; Mack Horton	Italy (ITA); Matteo Ciampi; Thomas Ceccon; Alberto Razzetti; Paolo Conte Bonin
2024 Budapest	United States (USA); Luke Hobson; Carson Foster; Shaine Casas; Kieran Smith	Australia (AUS); Maximillian Giuliani; Edward Sommerville; Harrison Turner; Elijah Winnington	Italy (ITA); Filippo Megli; Manuel Frigo; Carlos D'Ambrosio; Alberto Razzetti

Rank	Nation	Gold	Silver	Bronze	Total
1	United States	7	2	2	11
2	Australia	4	5		9
3	Russia	2	2	2	6
4	Italy	1	1	3	5
5	Sweden	1	1		2
6	Brazil	1		4	5
7	Netherlands	1			1
8	Great Britain		3	1	4
9	Germany		2	1	3
10	RSF		1		1
11	Canada			1	1
11	China			1	1
11	France			1	1
11	Japan			1	1
Total		17	17	17	51

== 4 × 50 metre medley relay ==
Year	Gold	Silver	Bronze
2014 Doha	Brazil (BRA); Guilherme Guido; Felipe França Silva; Nicholas Santos; César Cielo	France (FRA); Benjamin Stasiulis; Giacomo Perez-Dortona; Mehdy Metella; Florent Manaudou	United States (USA); Eugene Godsoe; Cody Miller; Tom Shields; Josh Schneider
2016 Windsor	Russia (RUS); Andrey Shabasov; Kirill Prigoda; Aleksandr Popkov; Vladimir Morozov	United States (USA); Jacob Pebley; Cody Miller; Tom Shields; Michael Chadwick	Belarus (BLR); Pavel Sankovich; Ilya Shymanovich; Yauhen Tsurkin; Anton Latkin
2018 Hangzhou	Russia (RUS); Kliment Kolesnikov; Oleg Kostin; Mikhail Vekovishchev; Evgeny Rylov	United States (USA); Ryan Murphy; Michael Andrew; Caeleb Dressel; Ryan Held	Brazil (BRA); Guilherme Guido; Felipe Lima; Nicholas Santos; César Cielo
2021 Abu Dhabi	Russian Swimming Federation (RSF); Kliment Kolesnikov; Kirill Strelnikov; Andrey Minakov; Vladimir Morozov	none awarded	Italy (ITA); Lorenzo Mora; Nicolò Martinenghi; Matteo Rivolta; Lorenzo Zazzeri
2021 Abu Dhabi	United States (USA); Shaine Casas; Nic Fink; Tom Shields; Ryan Held	none awarded	Italy (ITA); Lorenzo Mora; Nicolò Martinenghi; Matteo Rivolta; Lorenzo Zazzeri
2022 Melbourne	Italy (ITA); Lorenzo Mora; Nicolò Martinenghi; Matteo Rivolta; Leonardo Deplano	United States (USA); Ryan Murphy; Nic Fink; Shaine Casas; Michael Andrew	Australia (AUS); Isaac Cooper; Grayson Bell; Matthew Temple; Kyle Chalmers

Rank	Nation	Gold	Silver	Bronze	Total
1	Russia	2			2
2	United States	1	3	1	5
3	Brazil	1		1	2
3	Italy	1		1	2
5	RSF	1			1
6	France		1		1
7	Australia			1	1
7	Belarus			1	1
Total		6	4	5	15

== 4 × 100 metre medley relay ==
Year	Gold	Silver	Bronze
1993 Palma de Mallorca	United States (USA); Tripp Schwenk; Eric Wunderlich; Mark Henderson; Jon Olsen	Spain (ESP); Carlos Ventosa; Sergío López; Joaquín Fernández; José Maria Rojano	Great Britain (GBR); Martin Harris; Nick Gillingham; Mike Fibbens; Mark Foster
1995 Rio de Janeiro	New Zealand (NZL); Jonathan Winter; Paul Kent; Murray Burdan; Nicholas Tongue	Australia (AUS); Adrian Radley; Robert van der Zant; Scott Miller; Michael Klim	Russia (RUS); Sergei Sudakov; Alexander Tkachev; Denis Pimankov; Yury Mukhin
1997 Gothenburg	Australia (AUS); Adrian Radley; Phil Rogers; Geoff Huegill; Michael Klim	Russia (RUS); Vladimir Selkov; Stanislav Lopukhov; Denis Pankratov; Roman Yegorov	Great Britain (GBR); Martin Harris; Richard Maden; James Hickman; Mark Foster
1999 Hong Kong	Australia (AUS); Matt Welsh; Phil Rogers; Michael Klim; Chris Fydler	Sweden (SWE); Mattias Ohlin; Patrik Isaksson; Daniel Carlsson; Lars Frölander	Great Britain (GBR); Neil Willey; Darren Mew; James Hickman; Sion Brinn
2000 Athens	United States (USA); Lenny Krayzelburg; Jarrod Marrs; Neil Walker; Scott Tucker	Germany (GER); Sebastian Halgasch; Björn Nowakowski; Thomas Rupprath; Stefan Herbst	Great Britain (GBR); Neil Willey; Darren Mew; James Hickman; Paul Belk
2002 Moscow	United States (USA); Aaron Peirsol; David Denniston; Peter Marshall; Jason Lezak	Australia (AUS); Geoff Huegill; Jim Piper; Adam Pine; Ashley Callus	Russia (RUS); Evgeny Aleshin; Dmitri Komornikov; Igor Marchenko; Denis Pimankov
2004 Indianapolis	United States (USA); Aaron Peirsol; Brendan Hansen; Ian Crocker; Jason Lezak	Australia (AUS); Matt Welsh; Brenton Rickard; Andrew Richards; Andrew Mewing	Russia (RUS); Arkady Vyatchanin; Andrei Ivanov; Nikolay Skvortsov; Andrey Kapralov
2006 Shanghai	Australia (AUS); Matt Welsh; Brenton Rickard; Adam Pine; Ashley Callus	United States (USA); Ryan Lochte; Scott Usher; Jayme Cramer; Nicholas Brunelli	Ukraine (UKR); Andriy Oleynyk; Oleh Lisohor; Serhiy Advena; Andriy Serdinov
2008 Manchester	Russia (RUS); Stanislav Donets; Sergey Geybel; Evgeny Korotyshkin; Alexander Sukhorukov	United States (USA); Randall Bal; Mark Gangloff; Ryan Lochte; Nathan Adrian	New Zealand (NZL); Daniel Bell; Glenn Snyders; Corney Swanepoel; Cameron Gibson
2010 Dubai	United States (USA); Nick Thoman; Mike Alexandrov; Ryan Lochte; Garrett Weber-Gale	Russia (RUS); Stanislav Donets; Stanislav Lakhtyukhov; Evgeny Korotyshkin; Nikita Lobintsev	Brazil (BRA); Guilherme Guido; Felipe França Silva; Kaio de Almeida; César Cielo Filho
2012 Istanbul	United States (USA); Matt Grevers; Kevin Cordes; Tom Shields; Ryan Lochte	Russia (RUS); Stanislav Donets; Viatcheslav Sinkevich; Nikolay Skvortsov; Vladimir Morozov	Australia (AUS); Robert Hurley; Kenneth To; Grant Irvine; Tommaso D'Orsogna
2014 Doha	Brazil (BRA); Guilherme Guido; Felipe França Silva; Marcos Macedo; César Cielo	United States (USA); Matt Grevers; Cody Miller; Tom Shields; Ryan Lochte	France (FRA); Florent Manaudou; Giacomo Perez-Dortona; Mehdy Metella; Clément Mignon
2016 Windsor	Russia (RUS); Andrey Shabasov; Kirill Prigoda; Aleksandr Kharlanov; Vladimir Morozov	Australia (AUS); Mitch Larkin; Tommy Sucipto; David Morgan; Tommaso D'Orsogna	Japan (JPN); Junya Koga; Yoshiki Yamanaka; Takeshi Kawamoto; Shinri Shioura
2018 Hangzhou	United States (USA); Ryan Murphy; Andrew Wilson; Caeleb Dressel; Ryan Held	Russia (RUS); Kliment Kolesnikov; Kirill Prigoda; Mikhail Vekovishchev; Vladimir Morozov	Japan (JPN); Ryosuke Irie; Yasuhiro Koseki; Takeshi Kawamoto; Katsumi Nakamura
2021 Abu Dhabi	Italy (ITA); Lorenzo Mora; Nicolò Martinenghi; Matteo Rivolta; Alessandro Miressi	United States (USA); Shaine Casas; Nic Fink; Trenton Julian; Ryan Held	Russian Swimming Federation (RSF); Kliment Kolesnikov; Danil Semianinov; Andrey Minakov; Aleksandr Shchegolev
2022 Melbourne	Australia (AUS); Isaac Cooper; Joshua Yong; Matthew Temple; Kyle Chalmers	none awarded	Italy (ITA); Lorenzo Mora; Nicolò Martinenghi; Matteo Rivolta; Alessandro Miressi
2022 Melbourne	United States (USA); Ryan Murphy; Nic Fink; Trenton Julian; Kieran Smith	none awarded	Italy (ITA); Lorenzo Mora; Nicolò Martinenghi; Matteo Rivolta; Alessandro Miressi
2024 Budapest	Neutral Athletes B (NAB); Miron Lifintsev; Kirill Prigoda; Andrey Minakov; Egor Kornev	United States (USA); Shaine Casas; Michael Andrew; Dare Rose; Jack Alexy	Italy (ITA); Lorenzo Mora; Ludovico Viberti; Michele Busa; Alessandro Miressi

Rank	Nation	Gold	Silver	Bronze	Total
1	United States	8	5		13
2	Australia	4	4	1	9
3	Russia	2	4	3	9
4	Italy	1		2	3
5	Brazil	1		1	2
5	New Zealand	1		1	2
7	Neutral Athletes B	1			1
8	Spain		1		1
8	Germany		1		1
8	Sweden		1		1
11	Great Britain			4	4
12	Japan			2	2
13	France			1	1
13	Ukraine			1	1
13	RSF			1	1
Total		18	16	17	51

== 4 × 50 metre mixed freestyle relay ==
Year	Gold	Silver	Bronze
2014 Doha	United States (USA); Josh Schneider; Matt Grevers; Madison Kennedy; Abbey Weitzeil	Russia (RUS); Evgeny Sedov; Vladimir Morozov; Veronika Popova; Rozaliya Nasretdinova	Brazil (BRA); César Cielo; João de Lucca; Etiene Medeiros; Larissa Oliveira
2016 Windsor	Russia (RUS); Aleksei Brianskiy; Vladimir Morozov; Maria Kameneva; Rozaliya Nasretdinova	Netherlands (NED); Jesse Puts; Nyls Korstanje; Ranomi Kromowidjojo; Maaike de Waard	Canada (CAN); Yuri Kisil; Markus Thormeyer; Michelle Williams; Sandrine Mainville
2018 Hangzhou	United States (USA); Caeleb Dressel; Ryan Held; Mallory Comerford; Kelsi Dahlia	Netherlands (NED); Jesse Puts; Stan Pijnenburg; Ranomi Kromowidjojo; Femke Heemskerk	Russia (RUS); Vladimir Morozov; Evgeny Sedov; Maria Kameneva; Rozaliya Nasretdinova
2021 Abu Dhabi	Canada (CAN); Joshua Liendo; Yuri Kisil; Kayla Sanchez; Maggie Mac Neil	Netherlands (NED); Jesse Puts; Thom de Boer; Ranomi Kromowidjojo; Kira Toussaint	Russian Swimming Federation (RSF); Vladimir Morozov; Andrey Minakov; Maria Kameneva; Arina Surkova
2022 Melbourne	France (FRA); Maxime Grousset; Florent Manaudou; Béryl Gastaldello; Mélanie Henique	Australia (AUS); Kyle Chalmers; Matthew Temple; Meg Harris; Emma McKeon	Netherlands (NED); Kenzo Simons; Thom de Boer; Maaike de Waard; Marrit Steenbergen
2024 Budapest	Italy (ITA); Leonardo Deplano; Alessandro Miressi; Silvia Di Pietro; Sara Curtis	Canada (CAN); Ilya Kharun; Yuri Kisil; Ingrid Wilm; Mary-Sophie Harvey	Poland (POL); Piotr Ludwiczak; Kamil Sieradzki; Kornelia Fiedkiewicz; Katarzyna Wasick

Rank	Nation	Gold	Silver	Bronze	Total
1	United States	2			2
2	Russia	1	1	1	3
2	Canada	1	1	1	3
4	France	1			1
4	Italy	1			1
6	Netherlands		3	1	4
7	Australia		1		1
8	Brazil			1	1
8	RSF			1	1
8	Poland			1	1
Total		6	6	6	18

== 4 × 50 metre mixed medley relay ==
Year	Gold	Silver	Bronze
2014 Doha	Brazil (BRA); Etiene Medeiros; Felipe França Silva; Nicholas Santos; Larissa Oliveira	Great Britain (GBR); Chris Walker-Hebborn; Adam Peaty; Siobhan-Marie O'Connor; Francesca Halsall	Italy (ITA); Niccolo Bonacchi; Fabio Scozzoli; Silvia Di Pietro; Erika Ferraioli
2016 Windsor	United States (USA); Tom Shields; Lilly King; Kelsi Worrell; Michael Chadwick	Brazil (BRA); Etiene Medeiros; Felipe Lima; Nicholas Santos; Larissa Oliveira	Japan (JPN); Junya Koga; Yoshiki Yamanaka; Rikako Ikee; Sayuki Ouchi
2018 Hangzhou	United States (USA); Olivia Smoliga; Michael Andrew; Kelsi Dahlia; Caeleb Dressel	Netherlands (NED); Jesse Puts; Ties Elzerman; Ranomi Kromowidjojo; Femke Heemskerk	Russia (RUS); Kliment Kolesnikov; Oleg Kostin; Rozaliya Nasretdinova; Maria Kameneva
2021 Abu Dhabi	Netherlands (NED); Kira Toussaint; Arno Kamminga; Thom de Boer; Ranomi Kromowidjojo	United States (USA); Shaine Casas; Nic Fink; Claire Curzan; Abbey Weitzeil	Italy (ITA); Lorenzo Mora; Nicolò Martinenghi; Elena Di Liddo; Silvia Di Pietro
2022 Melbourne	United States (USA); Ryan Murphy; Nic Fink; Kate Douglass; Torri Huske	Italy (ITA); Lorenzo Mora; Nicolo Martinenghi; Silvia di Pietro; Costanza Cocconcelli	Canada (CAN); Kylie Masse; Javier Acevedo; Ilya Kharun; Maggie Mac Neil
2024 Budapest	Neutral Athletes B (NAB); Miron Lifintsev; Kirill Prigoda; Arina Surkova; Daria Trofimova	Canada (CAN); Kylie Masse; Finlay Knox; Ilya Kharun; Ingrid Wilm	United States (USA); Shaine Casas; Michael Andrew; Regan Smith; Katharine Berkoff

Rank	Nation	Gold	Silver	Bronze	Total
1	United States	3	1	1	5
2	Brazil	1	1		2
2	Netherlands	1	1		2
4	Neutral Athletes B	1			1
5	Italy		1	2	3
6	Canada		1	1	2
7	Great Britain		1		1
8	Japan			1	1
8	Russia			1	1
Total		6	6	6	18

== 4 × 100 metre mixed medley relay ==
Year	Gold	Silver	Bronze
2024 Budapest	Neutral Athletes B (NAB); Miron Lifintsev; Kirill Prigoda; Arina Surkova; Daria Klepikova	United States (USA); Regan Smith; Lilly King; Dare Rose; Jack Alexy	Canada (CAN); Ingrid Wilm; Finlay Knox; Ilya Kharun; Mary-Sophie Harvey

Rank	Nation	Gold	Silver	Bronze	Total
1	Neutral Athletes B	1			1
2	United States		1		1
3	Canada			1	1
Total		1	1	1	3

== See also ==
- List of World Swimming Championships (25 m) medalists (women)
