= Swimming at the 2001 World Aquatics Championships – Men's 4 × 200 metre freestyle relay =

Men's 4×200m Free Relay at the 2001 FINA World Aquatics Championships
- Dates: July 27, 2001
- Winning time: 7:04.66

Medalists
gold medal	Australia
silver medal	Italy
bronze medal	United States

The Men's 4x200 Freestyle Relay event at the 10th FINA World Aquatics Championships was swum on July 27, 2001. The heats and finals took place July 27.

== Records ==
Prior to the competition, the existing world and championship records were as follows:

World Record	Australia (AUS); Ian Thorpe (1:46.03); Michael Klim (1:46.40); Todd Pearson (1:47.36); Bill Kirby (1:47.26)	7:07.05	Sydney, Australia	19 September 2000
Championship Record	Australia (AUS); Michael Klim (1:47.67); Grant Hackett (1:48.41); Ian Thorpe (1:47.67); Daniel Kowalski (1:48.73)	7:12.48	Perth, Australia	13 January 1998

The following record was established during the competition:

Date	Round	Nation	Time	Record
27 July 2001	Final	Australia; Grant Hackett (1:46.11); Michael Klim (1:46.49); Bill Kirby (1:47.92); Ian Thorpe (1:44.14)	7:04.66	WR

== Results ==
=== Heats ===
Place	Heat	Lane	Nation	Swimmers (split)	Time	Notes
1	1	4	United States	Nate Dusing (1:48.29); Jay Schryver (1:49.20); Jamie Rauch (1:49.19); Chad Carvin (1:48.52)	7:15.20	Q
2	1	5	United Kingdom	Edward Sinclair (1:49.65); Paul Palmer (1:48.86); Marc Spackman (1:50.80); James Salter (1:50.19)	7:19.50	Q
3	2	4	Australia	Todd Pearson (1:49.81); Antony Matkovich (1:50.48); Ray Hass (1:50.00); Bill Kirby (1:49.56)	7:19.85	Q
4	2	6	Canada	Mark Johnston (1:50.44); Rick Say (1:50.14); Brian Johns (1:50.18); Mike Mintenko (1:49.93)	7:20.69	Q
5	2	5	Italy	Federico Cappellazzo (1:50.02); Andrea Righi (1:51.00); Simone Cercato (1:51.19); Andrea Beccari (1:48.60)	7:20.81	Q
6	2	3	Germany	Johannes Oesterling (1:49.80); Lars Conrad (1:50.70); Stefan Pohl (1:49.29); Stefan Herbst (1:51.28)	7:21.07	Q
7	1	6	Japan	Shunsuke Ito (1:51.64); Daisuke Hosokawa (1:50.31); Yoshihiro Okumura (1:50.50); Hideaki Hara (1:49.58)	7:22.03	Q
8	1	3	Russia	Stepan Ganzey (1:50.40); Anatoly Polyakov (1:52.65); Maxim Korchounov (1:53.41); Dmitry Chernyshov (1:53.07)	7:29.53	Q
9	2	2	Mexico	Javier Díaz (1:52.88); Alejandro Siqueiros (1:54.63); Leonardo Salinas (1:56.35); Jacob Fraire (1:57.26)	7:41.12	
10	1	2	Malaysia	Wan Azlan (1:59.07); Alex Lim Keng Liat (1:56.76); Dieung Manggang (1:57.48); Elvin Chia (1:56.32)	7:49.63	
11	2	7	Singapore	Fergus Kuek (1:58.27); Gerald Koh (1:59.66); Benjamin Gan (1:58.03); Ernest Teo (2:02.37)	7:58.33	
12	1	8	Chinese Taipei	Wu Nien-Pin (1:59.28); Jiang Bing-Ru (1:59.96); Hsu Kuo-Tung (2:05.12); Chen Jui-Chen (2:06.22)	8:10.58	

=== Final ===
Place	Lane	Nation	Swimmers (split)	Time	Notes
1st place, gold medalist(s)	3	Australia	Grant Hackett (1:46.11); Michael Klim (1:46.49); William Kirby (1:47.92); Ian Thorpe (1:44.14)	7:04.66	WR
2nd place, silver medalist(s)	2	Italy	Emiliano Brembilla (1:48.19); Matteo Pelliciari (1:48.02); Andrea Beccari (1:47.97); Massimiliano Rosolino (1:46.68)	7:10.86	
3rd place, bronze medalist(s)	4	United States	Scott Goldblatt (1:49.00); Nate Dusing (1:48.78); Chad Carvin (1:48.41); Klete Keller (1:47.50)	7:13.69	
4	5	United Kingdom	Edward Sinclair (1:49.95); Paul Palmer (1:47.14); Marc Spackman (1:49.55); James Salter (1:48.96)	7:15.60	
5	7	Germany	Johannes Oesterling (1:50.29); Stefan Herbst (1:48.87); Stefan Pohl (1:49.07); Lars Conrad (1:49.06)	7:17.29	
6	6	Canada	Mark Johnston (1:50.12); Rick Say (1:49.00); Brian Johns (1:49.42); Mike Mintenko (1:49.26)	7:17.80	
7	1	Japan	Hideaki Hara (1:50.90); Daisuke Hosokawa (1:49.32); Yoshihiro Okumura (1:49.87); Funichi Fujita (1:50.51)	7:20.60	
8	8	Russia	Stepan Ganzey (1:50.24); Dmitry Chernyshov (1:49.04); Anatoly Polyakov (1:50.83); Maxim Kuznetsov (1:52.33)	7:22.44	
