= Swimming at the 2001 World Aquatics Championships – Men's 4 × 100 metre freestyle relay =

Men's 4×100 metre freestyle relay at the 2001 World Aquatics Championships
- Dates: 22 July 2001
- Winning time: 3:14.10

Medalists
gold medal	Michael Klim; Ashley Callus; Todd Pearson; Ian Thorpe	Australia
silver medal	Mark Veens; Johan Kenkhuis; Klaas-Erik Zwering; Pieter van den Hoogenband	Netherlands
bronze medal	Stefan Herbst; Torsten Spanneberg; Lars Conrad; Sven Lodziewski	Germany

The men's 4 × 100 metre freestyle relay event at the 2001 World Aquatics Championships took place in Marine Messe in Fukuoka, Japan on 22 July 2001.

Prior to this meet, the United States have never lost this race since the inception of the World Championships in 1973. The final of the relay was notable for Ian Thorpe's swimming the closing leg for Australia with his fastest-ever relay split of 47.87 s, for the 47.02 seconds final leg, the fastest relay leg in history by Pieter van den Hoogenband and for the disqualification after the race of the American team.

== Records ==
Prior to this competition, the existing world and competition records were as follows:

World Record	Australia (AUS); Michael Klim (48.18); Chris Fydler (48.48); Ashley Callus (48.71); Ian Thorpe (48.30)	3:13.67	Sydney, Australia	16 September 2000
Championship Record	United States (USA); Scott Tucker (49.80); Neil Walker (48.75); Jon Olsen (49.48); Gary Hall, Jr. (48.66)	3:16.69	Perth, Australia	15 January 1998

The following record was established during the competition:

Date	Round	Nation	Time	Record
22 July	Final	Australia; Michael Klim (49.12); Ashley Callus (48.31); Todd Pearson (48.80); Ian Thorpe (47.87)	3:14.10	CR

== Results ==
=== Heats ===
Place	Heat	Lane	Nation	Swimmers (split)	Time	Notes
1	2	4	United States	Neil Walker (49.73); Scott Tucker (48.39); Gregory Busse (49.38); Daniel Jones (49.61)	3:17.11	Q
2	3	4	Australia	Michael Klim (48.90); David Jenkins (49.93); Adam Pine (49.42); Todd Pearson (49.02)	3:17.27	Q
3	2	6	Netherlands	Mark Veens (49.90); Ewout Holst (49.89); Klaas-Erik Zwering (49.23); Johan Kenkhuis (49.46)	3:18.48	Q
4	3	5	Germany	Lars Conrad (50.07); Sven Lodziewski (49.84); Stefan Herbst (49.57); Torsten Spanneberg (49.12)	3:18.60	Q
5	3	3	Sweden	Erik Dorch (51.28); Stefan Nystrand (49.32); Lars Frölander (48.67); Eric la Fleur (49.93)	3:19.20	Q
6	2	5	Italy	Klaus Lanzarini (50.72); Andrea Beccari (50.05); Matteo Pelliciari (49.70); Simone Cercato (49.56)	3:20.03	Q
7	1	4	Brazil	Edvaldo Valério (50.52); Carlos Jayme (50.20); Rodrigo Castro (50.05); Gustavo Borges (50.42)	3:21.19	Q
8	1	5	Russia	Maxim Korchunov (50.81); Igor Marchenko (50.76); Dmitri Talepov (50.36); Dmitry Chernyshov (49.77)	3:21.70	Q
9	2	3	Japan	Yoshihiro Okumura (50.89); Daisuke Hosokawa (50.09); Shunsuke Ito (50.35); Hideaki Hara (50.68)	3:22.01	
10	1	3	Switzerland	Christoph Bühler (51.93); Karel Novy (49.32); Philipp Gilgen (51.48); Lorenz Liechti (51.37)	3:24.10	
11	3	2	Singapore	Fergus Kuek (53.65); Ernest Teo (52.68); Gary Tan (52.09); Mark Chay (52.36)	3:30.78	
12	3	6	Mexico	Alejandro Siqueiros (51.94); Cesar Uribe (54.04); Juan José Veloz (53.01); Jacob Fraire (53.02)	3:32.01	
13	1	6	Malaysia	Elvin Chia (52.76); Dieung Manggang (54.57); Yu Lung Lubrey Lim (55.98); Wan Azlan (55.78)	3:39.09	
14	2	2	Chinese Taipei	Wu Nien-Pin (53.13); Jiang Bing-Ru (54.87); Yang Shang-Hsuan (56.82); Chen Jui-Chen (57.58)	3:42.40	
15	1	2	Uzbekistan	Ravil Nachaev (52.52); Sergey Voytsekhovich (58.31); Oleg Lyashko (56.96); Aleksey Bortnikov (56.51)	3:44.30	
16	3	7	Macau	Chon Kit Alias Joao Tang (55.58); Wing Cheung Victor Wong (58.21); Chi Lon Lei (57.87); Keng Ip Lou (57.71)	3:49.37	
17	2	7	Guam	Daniel Kang (58.67); Kin Duenas (59.43); Mark Unpingco (59.32); William Kang (58.11)	3:55.53	

=== Final ===
Place	Lane	Nation	Swimmers (split)	Time	Notes
1st place, gold medalist(s)	5	Australia	Michael Klim (49.12); Ashley Callus (48.31); Todd Pearson (48.80); Ian Thorpe (47.87)	3:14.10	CR
2nd place, silver medalist(s)	3	Netherlands	Mark Veens (49.80); Johan Kenkhuis (48.56); Klaas-Erik Zwering (49.18); Pieter van den Hoogenband (47.02)	3:14.56	ER
3rd place, bronze medalist(s)	6	Germany	Stefan Herbst (50.54); Torsten Spanneberg (48.86); Lars Conrad (49.08); Sven Lodziewski (49.04)	3:17.52	
4	2	Sweden	Mattias Ohlin (50.70); Lars Frölander (48.31); Stefan Nystrand (48.79); Eric la Fleur (50.20)	3:18.00	
5	7	Italy	Lorenzo Vismara (50.49); Matteo Pelliciari (49.54); Klaus Lanzarini (50.06); Simone Cercato (49.28)	3:19.37	
6	8	Russia	Maxim Korchunov (50.92); Leonid Khokhlov (50.38); Dmitri Talepov (50.16); Dmitry Chernyshov (50.17)	3:21.63	
–	1	Brazil	Gustavo Borges; Edvaldo Valério; Rodrigo Castro; Carlos Jayme	DSQ	
–	4	United States	Scott Tucker; Anthony Ervin; Gregory Busse; Jason Lezak	DSQ	
