= Swimming at the 2000 Summer Olympics – Men's 4 × 200 metre freestyle relay =

Men's 4 × 200 metre freestyle relay at the Games of the XXVII Olympiad
- Venue: Sydney International Aquatic Centre
- Dates: September 19, 2000 (heats & final)
- Competitors: 75 from 16 nations
- Teams: 15
- Winning time: 7:07.05 WR

Medalists
| 1st place, gold medalist(s) | | Ian Thorpe, Michael Klim, Todd Pearson, Bill Kirby, Grant Hackett*, Daniel Kowalski* | Australia |
| 2nd place, silver medalist(s) | | Scott Goldblatt, Josh Davis, Jamie Rauch, Klete Keller, Nate Dusing*, Chad Carvin* | United States |
| 3rd place, bronze medalist(s) | | Martijn Zuijdweg, Johan Kenkhuis, Marcel Wouda, Pieter van den Hoogenband, Mark van der Zijden*; *Indicates the swimmer only competed in the preliminary heats. | Netherlands |

The men's 4 × 200 metre freestyle relay event at the 2000 Summer Olympics took place on 19 September at the Sydney International Aquatic Centre in Sydney, Australia.

After defeating the Americans to capture the 4 × 100 m freestyle relay title four days earlier, the Australians added another relay gold medal to their hardware in the event by the delight of a raucous home crowd. Dominating the race from start to finish, the Aussie foursome of Ian Thorpe (1:46.03), Michael Klim (1:46.40), Todd Pearson (1:47.36), and Bill Kirby (1:47.26) posted a sterling time of 7:07.05 to demolish a new world record and cut off the former Soviet Union's 1992 Olympic standard by almost four seconds.

Team USA's Scott Goldblatt (1:49.66), Josh Davis (1:46.49), Jamie Rauch (1:48.74) sent Klete Keller to be an anchor for a second-place battle. Trailing behind the Dutch and the Italians with only 25 metres left, Keller fought off a tight challenge with a split of 1:47.75 to snatch the silver for the Americans in 7:12.64. Meanwhile, the Netherlands moved from fifth-place turns by Martijn Zuijdweg (1:49.60), Johan Kenkhuis (1:51.18), and Marcel Wouda (1:48.56) to race on the final stretch for the bronze in 7:12.70, after producing a superb anchor of 1:44.88, the fastest split of all time, set by Olympic champion Pieter van den Hoogenband.

The Italian team of Andrea Beccari (1:49.67), Matteo Pelliciari (1:48.41), Emiliano Brembilla (1:48.92), and Massimiliano Rosolino (1:45.91) missed the podium with a fourth-place time of 7:12.91, holding off the fast-pacing Brits' Edward Sinclair (1:49.61), Paul Palmer (1:47.15), Marc Spackman (1:48.85), and James Salter (1:47.37) by seven-hundredths of a second (7:12.98). Germany (7:20.19), Canada (7:21.92), and Russia (7:24.37) rounded out the championship finale.

The medals for the competition were presented by Mohammed Mzali, IOC Member, Tunisia; and the medalists' bouquets were presented by Eldon Godfrey, FINA Bureau Member; Canada.

== Records ==
Prior to this competition, the existing world and Olympic records were as follows.

| World record | Australia (AUS); Ian Thorpe (1:46.28); Bill Kirby (1:48.96); Grant Hackett (1:46.30); Michael Klim (1:47.25) | 7:08.79 | Sydney, Australia | 25 August 1999 |
| Olympic record | Unified Team; Dmitry Lepikov (1:49.55); Vladimir Pyshnenko (1:46.58); Veniamin Tayanovich (1:48.99); Yevgeny Sadovyi (1:46.83) | 7:11.95 | Barcelona, Spain | 27 July 1992 |

The following new world and Olympic records were set during this competition.

| Date | Event | Name | Nationality | Time | Record |
|---|---|---|---|---|---|
| September 19 | Final | Ian Thorpe (1:46.03); Michael Klim (1:46.40); Todd Pearson (1:47.36); Bill Kirby (1:47.26) | Australia | 7:07.05 | WR |

== Results ==
=== Heats ===
| Rank | Heat | Lane | Nation | Swimmers | Time | Notes |
|---|---|---|---|---|---|---|
| 1 | 2 | 4 | Australia | Grant Hackett (1:50.31); Bill Kirby (1:47.76); Todd Pearson (1:47.68); Daniel Kowalski (1:48.52) | 7:14.27 | Q |
| 2 | 1 | 4 | United States | Chad Carvin (1:49.65); Nate Dusing (1:49.44); Jamie Rauch (1:48.94); Klete Keller (1:49.19) | 7:17.22 | Q |
| 3 | 1 | 5 | Italy | Andrea Beccari (1:49.30); Klaus Lanzarini (1:49.77); Simone Cercato (1:50.36); Matteo Pelliciari (1:48.26) | 7:17.69 | Q |
| 4 | 2 | 3 | Germany | Heiko Hell (1:50.48); Michael Kiedel (1:50.64); Christian Keller (1:49.12); Stefan Herbst (1:49.71) | 7:19.95 | Q |
| 5 | 2 | 6 | Netherlands | Martijn Zuijdweg (1:49.60); Mark van der Zijden (1:51.18); Johan Kenkhuis (1:50.27); Marcel Wouda (1:49.62) | 7:20.67 | Q |
| 6 | 2 | 5 | Great Britain | James Salter (1:49.62); Andrew Clayton (1:51.87); Marc Spackman (1:49.94); Edward Sinclair (1:49.26) | 7:20.69 | Q |
| 7 | 1 | 3 | Canada | Mark Johnston (1:50.24); Brian Johns (1:51.19); Mike Mintenko (1:49.79); Rick Say (1:50.23) | 7:21.45 | Q |
| 8 | 1 | 6 | Russia | Andrey Kapralov (1:49.52); Aleksey Yegorov (1:52.67); Sergey Lavrenov (1:51.68); Dmitry Chernyshov (1:49.71) | 7:23.58 | Q |
| 9 | 2 | 2 | Romania | Dragoș Coman (1:50.25); Cezar Bădiță (1:49.90); Răzvan Florea (1:52.85); Ioan Gherghel (1:51.06) | 7:24.06 | |
| 10 | 1 | 1 | Hungary | Attila Czene (1:52.66); Zsolt Gáspár (1:51.86); Jácint Simon (1:50.32); Bela Szabados (1:49.64) | 7:24.48 | NR |
| 11 | 2 | 7 | Denmark | Jacob Carstensen (1:49.80); Henrik Steen Andersen (1:51.51); Jeppe Nielsen (1:51.98); Dennis Otzen Jensen (1:51.34) | 7:24.63 | |
| 12 | 1 | 7 | Belarus | Igor Koleda (1:49.44); Pavel Lagoun (1:52.83); Dmitry Koptur (1:51.14); Valeryan Khuroshvili (1:51.42) | 7:24.83 | |
| 13 | 1 | 2 | Brazil | Edvaldo Silva Filho (1:51.68); Leonardo Costa (1:51.53); Luiz Lima (1:51.81); Rodrigo Castro (1:51.40) | 7:26.42 | |
| 14 | 2 | 1 | Ukraine | Sergey Fesenko (1:54.11); Igor Snitko (1:52.31); Artem Goncharenko (1:52.98); Rostyslav Svanidze (1:52.76) | 7:32.16 | |
| 15 | 2 | 8 | Greece | Athanasios Oikonomou (1:52.72); Dimitrios Manganas (1:54.58); Spyridon Bitsakis (1:55.23); Spyridon Gianniotis (1:53.24) | 7:35.77 | |
| | 1 | 8 | Kyrgyzstan | Andrei Pakin; Dmitri Kuzmin; Aleksandr Shilin; Ivan Ivanov | DSQ | |

=== Final ===
| Rank | Lane | Nation | Swimmers | Time | Time behind | Notes |
|---|---|---|---|---|---|---|
| 1st place, gold medalist(s) | 4 | Australia | Ian Thorpe (1:46.03); Michael Klim (1:46.40); Todd Pearson (1:47.36); Bill Kirby (1:47.26) | 7:07.05 | | WR |
| 2nd place, silver medalist(s) | 5 | United States | Scott Goldblatt (1:49.66); Josh Davis (1:46.49); Jamie Rauch (1:48.74); Klete Keller (1:47.75) | 7:12.64 | 5.59 | |
| 3rd place, bronze medalist(s) | 2 | Netherlands | Martijn Zuijdweg (1:49.89); Johan Kenkhuis (1:49.37); Marcel Wouda (1:48.56); Pieter van den Hoogenband (1:44.88) | 7:12.70 | 5.65 | NR |
| 4 | 3 | Italy | Andrea Beccari (1:49.67); Matteo Pelliciari (1:48.41); Emiliano Brembilla (1:48.92); Massimiliano Rosolino (1:45.91) | 7:12.91 | 5.86 | |
| 5 | 7 | Great Britain | Edward Sinclair (1:49.61); Paul Palmer (1:47.15); Marc Spackman (1:48.85); James Salter (1:47.37) | 7:12.98 | 5.93 | |
| 6 | 6 | Germany | Stefan Pohl (1:50.83); Christian Keller (1:50.01); Stefan Herbst (1:49.05); Christian Tröger (1:50.30) | 7:20.19 | 13.14 | |
| 7 | 1 | Canada | Mark Johnston (1:50.44); Mike Mintenko (1:49.94); Rick Say (1:48.71); Yannick Lupien (1:52.83) | 7:21.92 | 14.87 | |
| 8 | 8 | Russia | Dmitry Chernyshov (1:50.44); Andrey Kapralov (1:51.16); Sergey Lavrenov (1:51.65); Alexei Filipets (1:51.12) | 7:24.37 | 17.32 | |
