= Swimming at the 2001 World Aquatics Championships – Men's 4 × 100 metre medley relay =

Men's 4×100 metre medley relay at the 2001 World Aquatics Championships
- Dates: 28 July 2001
- Winning time: 3:35.35

Medalists
gold medal	Matt Welsh; Regan Harrison; Geoff Huegill; Ian Thorpe	Australia
silver medal	Steffen Driesen; Jens Kruppa; Thomas Rupprath; Torsten Spanneberg	Germany
bronze medal	Vladislav Aminov; Dmitry Komornikov; Vladislav Kulikov; Dmitry Chernyshov	Russia

The men's 4 × 100 metre medley relay event at the 2001 World Aquatics Championships took place in Marine Messe in Fukuoka, Japan in 28 July 2001.

== Records ==
Prior to the competition, the existing world and championship records were as follows.

	Nation	Time	Location	Date
World record	United States; Lenny Krayzelburg (53.87); Ed Moses (59.84); Ian Crocker (52.10); Gary Hall Jr. (47.92)	3:33.73	Sydney, Australia	23 Sep 2000
Championship record	United States; Jeff Rouse (54.49); Eric Wunderlich (1:01.34); Mark Henderson (53.33); Gary Hall Jr. (48.55)	3:37.74	Rome, Italy	11 Sep 1994

The following record was established during the competition:

Date	Round	Nation	Time	Record
28 July	Heat 3	United States; Aaron Peirsol (55.36); Brendan Hansen (1:00.32); Daniel Jones (52.93); Scott Tucker (48.95)	3:37.56	CR
28 July	Final	Australia; Matt Welsh (55.19); Regan Harrison (1:00.80); Geoff Huegill (51.39); Ian Thorpe (47.97)	3:35.35	CR

== Results ==
=== Heats ===
Place	Heat	Lane	Nation	Swimmers (split)	Time	Notes
1	3	4	United States	Aaron Peirsol (55.36); Brendan Hansen (1:00.32); Daniel Jones (52.93); Scott Tucker (48.95)	3:37.56	Q, CR
2	2	4	Australia	Josh Watson (55.96); Phil Rogers (1:01.50); Adam Pine (52.84); Ashley Callus (48.53)	3:38.83	Q
3	1	3	Canada	Tobias Oriwol (56.58); Morgan Knabe (1:00.34); Mike Mintenko (52.36); Rick Say (49.98)	3:39.26	Q
4	1	5	Hungary	Péter Horváth (55.81); Károly Güttler (1:01.80); Zsolt Gáspár (53.25); Attila Zubor (48.64)	3:39.50	Q
5	1	4	Germany	Steffen Driesen (56.00); Jens Kruppa (1:02.88); Thomas Rupprath (52.35); Torsten Spanneberg (48.55)	3:39.78	Q
6	3	5	Netherlands	Klaas-Erik Zwering (56.40); Benno Kuipers (1:02.73); Joris Keizer (52.92); Johan Kenkhuis (47.89)	3:39.94	Q
7	3	3	Russia	Vladislav Aminov (55.75); Dmitry Komornikov (1:00.75); Igor Marchenko (52.89); Leonid Khokhlov (50.96)	3:40.35	Q
8	2	5	Japan	Atsushi Nishikori (56.47); Kosuke Kitajima (1:00.89); Takashi Yamamoto (52.94); Yoshihiro Okumura (50.54)	3:40.84	Q
9	2	3	Sweden	Daniel Lönnberg (57.56); Martin Gustafsson (1:02.33); Lars Frölander (52.21); Stefan Nystrand (49.21)	3:41.31	
10	2	6	Croatia	Gordan Kožulj (55.74); Vanja Rogulj (1:02.15); Ivan Mladina (54.49); Duje Draganja (49.60)	3:41.98	
11	3	6	Brazil	Alexandre Massura (56.75); Eduardo Fischer (1:02.25); Fernando Alves (53.86); Gustavo Borges (49.88)	3:42.74	
12	3	2	Italy	Eduardo Merisi (56.99); Domenico Fioravanti (1:01.82); Christian Galenda (53.91); Simone Cercato (50.60)	3:43.32	
13	1	6	Switzerland	Philipp Gilgen (58.45); Remo Lütolf (1:04.24); Lorenz Liechti (57.15); Karel Novy (50.72)	3:50.56	
14	2	2	China	Zheng Shibin (58.86); Zeng Qiliang (1:05.97); Ouyang Kunpeng (53.71); Xie Xufeng (52.89)	3:51.43	
15	3	7	Mexico	Juan Carlos Rodela (58.50); Javier Díaz (1:06.92); Cesar Uribe (56.11); Alejandro Siqueiros (52.71)	3:54.24	
16	2	7	Chinese Taipei	Wu Nien-Pin (1:00.84); Yang Shang-Hsuan (1:05.47); Chen Jui-Then (58.97); Jiang Bing-Ru (54.66)	3:59.94	
17	1	7	Macau	Chi Lon Lei (1:03.04); Chan Wai Ma (1:08.37); Wing Cheung Victor Wong (59.05); Chon Kit Alias Joao Tang (55.39)	4:05.85	

=== Final ===
Place	Lane	Nation	Swimmers (split)	Time	Notes
1st place, gold medalist(s)	5	Australia	Matt Welsh (55.19); Regan Harrison (1:00.80); Geoff Huegill (51.39); Ian Thorpe (47.97)	3:35.35	CR
2nd place, silver medalist(s)	2	Germany	Steffen Driesen (55.22); Jens Kruppa (1:01.06); Thomas Rupprath (51.96); Torsten Spanneberg (48.10)	3:36.34	
3rd place, bronze medalist(s)	1	Russia	Vladislav Aminov (55.63); Dmitry Komornikov (1:00.90); Vladislav Kulikov (52.01); Dmitry Chernyshov (49.23)	3:37.77	
4	3	Canada	Tobias Oriwol (56.46); Morgan Knabe (1:00.51); Mike Mintenko (51.63); Rick Say (49.63)	3:38.23	
5	6	Hungary	Péter Horváth (55.48); Károly Güttler (1:01.29); Zsolt Gáspár (53.05); Attila Zubor (48.47)	3:38.29	
6	8	Japan	Atsushi Nishikori (54.33); Kosuke Kitajima (1:00.18); Takashi Yamamoto (52.19); Daisuke Hosokawa (50.22)	3:38.92	
–	7	Netherlands	Klaas-Erik Zwering; Benno Kuipers; Joris Keizer; Pieter van den Hoogenband	DSQ	
–	4	United States	Randall Bal; Ed Moses; Ian Crocker; Anthony Ervin	DSQ	
