= Verhaeren =

Verhaeren is a surname. Notable people with the surname include:

- Alfred Verhaeren (1849–1924), Belgian painter
- Émile Verhaeren (1855–1916), Belgian poet and art critic
- Jacco Verhaeren (born 1969), Dutch swimming coach and manager

== See also ==
- 12697 Verhaeren, main-belt asteroid
