= Sergey Lavrenov =

Russian swimmer

Personal information
- Nationality: Russia
- Born: 28 January 1981 (age 45) Moscow, Russian SFSR, Soviet Union
- Height: 1.86 m (6 ft 1 in)
- Weight: 71 kg (157 lb)

Sport
- Sport: Swimming
- Strokes: Freestyle

Sergey Lavrenov (Russian: Серге́й Лавренов; born January 28, 1981, in Moscow) is a retired Russian swimmer, who specialized in middle-distance freestyle events. Lavrenov competed for the Russian squad in the men's 4 × 200 m freestyle relay at the 2000 Summer Olympics in Sydney. Teaming with Dmitry Chernyshov, Andrey Kapralov, and long-distance freestyle star Alexei Filipets, Lavrenov swam the second leg and recorded a split of 1:51.65. The Russians rounded out the finale in eighth place with a final time of 7:24.37, finishing more than 17 seconds off the global standard set by the winning Aussies.
