= Stepan Ganzey =

Russian swimmer (born 1981)

Personal information
- Full name: Stepan Sergeyevich Ganzey
- National team: Russia
- Born: 30 May 1981 (age 45) Vladivostok, Russian SFSR, Soviet Union
- Height: 1.80 m (5 ft 11 in)
- Weight: 75 kg (165 lb)

Sport
- Sport: Swimming
- Strokes: Freestyle
- Club: Khanty-Mansiyskiy AO
- Coach: Boris Vasilenko

Stepan Sergeyevich Ganzey (Russian: Степан Серге́евич Ганзей; born 30 May 1981) is a Russian former swimmer, who specialized in freestyle events. He is a multiple-time Russian champion and a two-time medalist at the European Junior Championships (1999). He is a member of Khanty-Mansiyskiy AO, and is coached and trained by Boris Vasilenko.

Ganzey qualified for the men's 4×200 m freestyle relay, as a member of the Russian team, at the 2004 Summer Olympics in Athens. Teaming with Maksim Kuznetsov, Yevgeniy Natsvin, and Alexei Zatsepine in the second heat, Ganzey swam the third leg, and recorded a split of 1:50.18. The Russians finished the race in sixth place and eleventh overall with a final time of 7:23.97.
