= Klaas-Erik Zwering =

Dutch swimmer

Personal information
- Nationality: Netherlands
- Born: 19 May 1981 (age 45) Eindhoven, North Brabant
- Height: 1.89 m (6 ft 2 in)
- Weight: 80 kg (176 lb)

Sport
- Sport: Swimming
- Strokes: Backstroke and freestyle
- Club: PSV Eindhoven
Medal record
Men's swimming
Representing the Netherlands
Olympic Games
Silver medal – second place	2004 Athens	4×100 m freestyle
World Championships (LC)
Silver medal – second place	2001 Fukuoka	4×100 m freestyle
European Championships (LC)
Gold medal – first place	1999 Istanbul	4×100 m medley

Klaas-Erik Zwering (born 19 May 1981) is a former Dutch swimmer and an Olympic medalist. He is currently studying MBO entrepreneurship as he trained in Eindhoven with the PSV Eindhoven swim club. His personal coach was Jacco Verhaeren, who is also coach for Dutch swimming phenom Pieter van den Hoogenband.

Zwering originally specialized in the 200 meter backstroke, coming in seventh place in his first senior competition at the European Championships in Istanbul. In the 2000 Olympic Games in Sydney, he came in tenth place in the same event. Recently, however, he has been focusing exclusively on freestyle swimming.

In 2001 at the FINA World Championships in Fukuoka, Japan, Klaas-Erik was a member of the silver medal-winning 4×100 meter freestyle relay team. Later, along with teammates Pieter van den Hoogenband, Johan Kenkhuis and Mitja Zastrow, Zwering won his first Olympic silver medal in the 4×100 meter freestyle relay in the 2004 Olympic Games in Athens, Greece. Afterwards he retired.

== See also ==
- Dutch records in swimming
