= Jamie Rauch =

American swimmer

Personal information
- Full name: James Richert Rauch
- Nickname: "Jamie"
- National team: United States
- Born: August 17, 1979 (age 46) Houston, Texas, U.S.
- Occupations: Asset Management; Athletic Training
- Height: 6 ft 5 in (1.96 m)
- Weight: 196 lb (89 kg)
- Spouse: Lauren Rauch

Sport
- Sport: Swimming
- Events: Middle Distance Freestyle; Freestyle Relays
- Strokes: Freestyle
- Club: Cypress Fairbanks Swim Club
- College team: University of Texas (2002)
- Coach: Clayton Cagle (Cypress Fairbanks SC); Eddie Reese (University of Texas)
Medal record
Men's swimming
Representing the United States
Olympic Games
Silver medal – second place	Sydney 2000	4x200 m freestyle

James Richert Rauch (born August 17, 1979) is an American former competition swimmer who competed for the University of Texas and was a 2000 Sydney Olympic silver medalist in the 4x200-meter freestyle relay. Since graduating with a business degree from the University of Texas in 2002, he has worked as an asset management consultant, and a trainer for triathletes and endurance athletes.

== Early life ==
Jamie Rauch was born August 17, 1979, in Houston, Texas and began competitive swimming at age nine. He attended Houston's Bleyl Middle School, where as a strong scholar he received the Karl Bleyl Award for receiving all A's throughout grades 6-8. He was a TAGS swimmer, who swam and trained with his strong local club swim team, Cypress Fairbanks Swim Club (FLEET) until college. His brother Rick also swam competitively during his High School years.

== Cypress Fairbanks Swim Club ==
At the Cypress Fairbanks Swim Club, Jamie was managed by accomplished Head Coach Clayton Cagle, who had been with the program since 1986.Jamie spent a few years playing basketball and football in High School but soon focused on swimming, though he was twice an All American Water Polo player for Cypress Creek High. Swimming for Cypress Fairbanks, in 1993, Swimming World Magazine rated Rauch seventh in the nation in the 11-12 age group in the 400 freestyle, and eighth in the 200 freestyle. Continuing to gain recognition at the age of fifteen, Rauch represented the Cypress Fairbanks Swim Club in April 1994 at the Gulf States Senior Championships, where he performed well and the team placed sixth in competition. In December 1995, showing stroke diversity, Rauch won the 200 Individual Medley Event at the Gulf "AA" Senior Championships, leading the Cypress Fairbanks team to place first in the competition, and defeat their second-place rival Houston-based Woodlands Swim Team for the first time. In an exceptional performance, Rauch won the 100, 200, 500, 1,000, and 1,500 freestyle events, and both the 200 and 400 Individual Medley. In February, 1996, Rauch was hoping to qualify for the 1996 U.S. Olympic trials in the 1,500 meter freestyle, but needed to cut four seconds from his time of 15:51.49 in the event.

== Cypress Creek High School ==
In his high school swimming career at Cypress Creek High, enrolling in 1993 and graduating in 1997, Rauch was a five-time UIL high school Texas state champion in swimming events and relays and his Cypress Creek High School team won the Texas state team Championship in his Sophomore year in 1995. As a Cypress Creek High upperclassman, Rauch was coached by John Webb. A consistently strong regional team, Cypress Creek High placed second as a team in the Texas State Championship in Rauch's Junior and Senior years, 1995-1997 to Houston's Woodlands High School. As of 2015, Rauch still held the Texas state High School record of 1:36.55 in the 200 freestyle. An accomplished student at Cypress Creek High, Rauch was a National Merit Scholar.

== University of Texas ==
In his college career at the University of Texas from 1997-2002, where he received an athletic scholarship, Rauch swam for Texas Hall of Fame Head Coach Eddie Reese. Representing Texas at the 2000 NCAA championship, Rauch swam the 100 freestyle in 48.36, the 200-freestyle in 1:46.35, and the 400 freestyle in 3:46.95, and also swam on the second place 4x100 and first place 4x200 freestyle relay teams. Rauch helped the University of Texas swim team win NCAA titles in 2000 and 2001, and was a member of 5 NCAA championship relays. He received All American honors 18 times during his collegiate career at UT. Likely taking time off for Olympic training, Rauch graduated the University of Texas in 2002, receiving an honors degree in Business and Finance, and a government degree. At the 2000 Sydney Olympics, there were six current or former University of Texas swimmers competing with Rauch, though Rauch and Josh Davis were the only two who actually grew up in Texas.

== 2000 Olympic silver medal ==
Rauch won a silver medal as a member of the second-place U.S. team in the men's 4×200-meter freestyle relay at the 2000 Summer Olympics in Sydney, Australia that swam a combined time of 7:12.64. Enjoying a homefield advantage, and an enthusiastic crowd, the strong Australian Men's team placed first for the gold with a combined time of 7:07.05.

In international competition, Rauch won bronze as part of the 4x200 free relay team at the July 2001 World Aquatics Championships in Fukuoka, Japan. In July, 1997 at the World University Games in Sicily, he had formerly captured gold competing with the American team in the 4x200 freestyle relay. Rauch qualified for the Goodwill Games in 2001, but chose to retire from competitive swimming.

=== Post-swimming pursuits ===
After he retired from swimming around 2001, Rauch spent a number of years on the USA Swimming Board of Directors and the USA Swimming Athlete Executive Committee. Rauch has competed in Triathlon, long distance running, and long distance swimming. While in Chicago, he has coached Triathlon for Patric Brady Coaching (PBC). In June 2015, he lived in Chicago with wife Lauren, and a son, and while serving with Core Capital Management, he had the title of Senior Analyst as a Chartered Financial Analyst, specializing in managing investments. He has worked independently as an athletic trainer for endurance athletes, but has continued to coach and train with Patrick Brady Coaching for a number of years.

=== Honors ===
In 2015, he was inducted with two other alumni into the Cedar Creek High School Alumni Wall of Honor. In 2016, he was inducted into the Texas Swimming and Diving Hall of Fame.

== See also ==
- List of Olympic medalists in swimming (men)
- List of University of Texas at Austin people
