= Todd Pearson =

Australian swimmer

Personal information
- Full name: Todd Robert Pearson
- National team: Australia
- Born: 25 November 1977 (age 48) Geraldton, Western Australia, Australia
- Height: 1.89 m (6 ft 2 in)
- Weight: 84 kg (185 lb)

Sport
- Sport: Swimming
- Strokes: Freestyle
- Club: West Coast Swimming Club
Medal record
Men's swimming
Representing Australia
Olympic Games
Gold medal – first place	2000 Sydney	4×100 m freestyle
Gold medal – first place	2000 Sydney	4×200 m freestyle
Silver medal – second place	2004 Athens	4×200 m freestyle
World Championships (LC)
Gold medal – first place	2001 Fukuoka	4×100 m freestyle
Gold medal – first place	2001 Fukuoka	4×200 m freestyle
World Championships (SC)
Gold medal – first place	1999 Hong Kong	4×100 m freestyle
Gold medal – first place	2002 Moscow	4×200 m freestyle
Pan Pacific Championships
Gold medal – first place	2002 Yokohama	4×100 m freestyle
Commonwealth Games
Gold medal – first place	2002 Manchester	4×100 m freestyle

Todd Robert Pearson OAM (born 25 November 1977) is an Australian former swimmer, who was born in Geraldton, Western Australia. He started swimming on the advice of a doctor treating his asthma. Pearson was vice captain of Hale School in 1994 where he spent time in Faulkner House and St George House. He was an Australian Institute of Sport scholarship holder.

He was no stranger to the Olympic Games. After swimming the heat of the 4×100-metre freestyle relay at the 2000 Summer Olympics in Sydney, Pearson was a spectator for the final, when the Australians set a world record by beating the US team for the first time in Olympic history. He went on to swim in the final of the 4×200-metre freestyle with Ian Thorpe, Michael Klim and Bill Kirby. The Australians led from start to finish, setting another world record and achieving every child's dream of winning gold for Australia. Pearson was awarded the Order of Australia medal for contribution to sport for this effort. After Sydney in 2000, Pearson won gold medals at the 2002 Pan Pacific Swimming Championships and the 2002 Commonwealth Games. He was also co-captain of the Australian swimming team in 2001. Despite swimming more than 50 kilometres a week, Pearson found time to complete a bachelor of commerce degree with a major in accounting and has worked for a multinational accounting firm.

Pearson later represented Australia in the 4×200-metre freestyle relay in the 2004 Summer Olympics in Athens, winning a silver medal.

== See also ==
- List of Olympic medalists in swimming (men)
