= Bill Kirby =

Australian swimmer (born 1975)

Bill Kirby OAM
Personal information
- Full name: William Ashley Kirby
- National team: Australia
- Born: 12 September 1975 (age 50) Perth, Western Australia
- Height: 1.80 m (5 ft 11 in)
- Weight: 77 kg (170 lb)

Sport
- Sport: Swimming
- Strokes: Freestyle
- Club: City of Perth Comets SC
Medal record
Men's swimming
Representing Australia
Olympic Games
Gold medal – first place	2000 Sydney	4×200 m freestyle
World Championships (LC)
Gold medal – first place	2001 Fukuoka	4×200 m freestyle
World Championships (SC)
Gold medal – first place	1997 Gothenburg	4×200 m freestyle
Pan Pacific Championships
Gold medal – first place	1999 Sydney	4×200 m freestyle
Commonwealth Games
Silver medal – second place	1998 Kuala Lumpur	200 m butterfly

William Ashley Kirby (born 12 September 1975) is an Australian swimmer who was competitive on an international level in the nineties and early 2000s. He specialized in freestyle and butterfly and won a gold medal at the 2000 Summer Olympics in Sydney as part of the 4 × 200 m freestyle relay team. He was an Australian Institute of Sport scholarship holder.

== Swimming career ==
Kirby made his debut at the 1993 Pan Pacific Championships before competing at the 1994 Commonwealth Games in Victoria, British Columbia, Canada, and the 1994 World Aquatics Championships in Rome as a butterfly swimmer. After missing selection for the 1996 Summer Olympics in Atlanta, due to glandular fever, he contemplated quitting the sport.

Kirby found his way back into the national team at the 1997 FINA World Short Course Swimming Championships in Gothenburg, Sweden. Although he missed selection for the 1998 World Aquatics Championships in his home town, he bounced back to qualify for the 1998 Commonwealth Games in Kuala Lumpur, where he won a silver medal in the 200m butterfly. At the 1999 Pan Pacific Championships in Sydney, he was a member of the 4 × 200 m freestyle relay team (along with Michael Klim, Ian Thorpe and Grant Hackett) that lowered the world record, at the time, to 7m 08.79s. Training at the Australian Institute of Sport, he earned an Olympic berth the following year, anchoring the Australian 4 × 200 m relay team of Thorpe, Klim and Todd Pearson to another world record of 7m 07.05s.

Kirby's final international competition was at the 2001 World Aquatics Championships in Fukuoka, Japan, where along with Klim, Hackett and Thorpe, he lowered the 4 × 200 m freestyle relay world record to 7m 04.66s. That record held firm for nearly six years until United States relay team clocked in at 7m 03.24s at the 2007 World Championships in Melbourne.

Kirby also collected a gold for swimming in the non-final heats of the 4 × 100 m freestyle relay and also swam in the finals of the 200m freestyle individual event. He retired after the championships to start a coaching career and business.

He now teaches swimming at Christ Church Grammar School, the school at which he was educated.

== See also ==
- List of Commonwealth Games medallists in swimming (men)
- List of Olympic medalists in swimming (men)
- World record progression 4 × 200 metres freestyle relay
