= Jacco Verhaeren =

Dutch swimming coach and manager (born 1969)

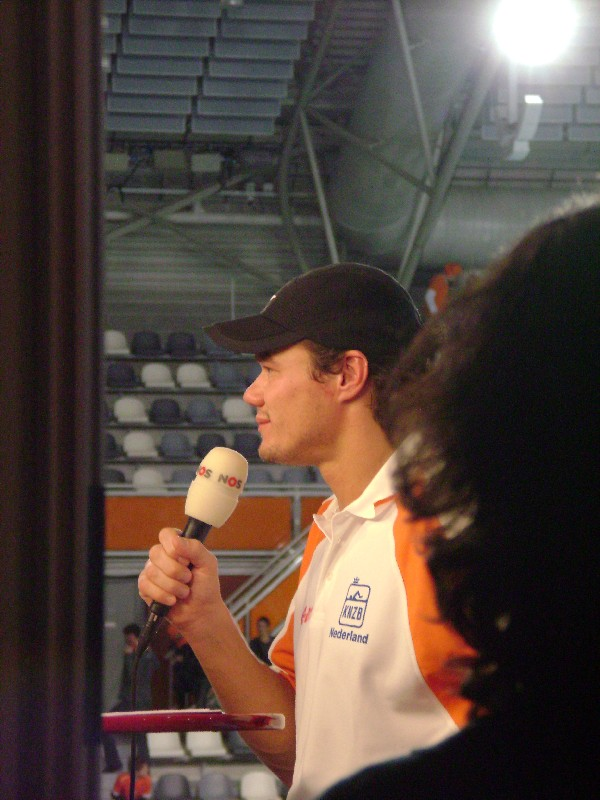
- Verhaeren in 2008
- Born: April 4, 1969 (age 57); Rijsbergen, North Brabant, Netherlands
- Occupations: Swimming coach, manager
- Years active: 1993–present

Jacco Verhaeren (born April 4, 1969 in Rijsbergen) is a Dutch swimming coach and manager. He is best known for guiding Pieter van den Hoogenband, Inge de Bruijn, and Ranomi Kromowidjojo to multiple Olympic gold medals, and for leading significant strategic and operational change as Director of the Australian Swimming Team between 2014 and 2020.

At his third and fourth Olympic Games in 2008 and 2012, Jacco acted in a combined coaching and Technical Director role. And after five Olympic Games he successfully transitioned to High Performance Management in 2012, becoming Sporting Director of the Dutch Swimming Team and the Nationaal Zweminstituut Eindhoven.

Verhaeren has since led the Australian Swimming Team after being appointed as head coach in late 2013. Within the leadership position, Jacco implemented individual athlete planning, and guided national coaches and performance services teams across decentralised high performance programs that operate within a complex national sporting system.

Since the 2016 Rio Olympic Games, Jacco has led significant change initiatives year-round and on-team in a clinical preparation for the Tokyo 2020 Olympic Games. In June 2019, Jacco announced he would depart the role and return to the Netherlands after the 2020 Games, his seventh Olympics.

In 2010 the book Boven Water about Verhaeren was published, written by his brother Henk Verhaeren. Jacco was awarded Netherlands Coach of the Decade in 2010, and honoured in 2012 with Ridder in de Orde van Oranje-Nassau (Royal Knight of Orange-Nassau).

== Swimmers formerly coached ==
- Inge de Bruijn
- Pieter van den Hoogenband (retired after the Beijing Olympics)
- Kirsten Vlieghuis
- Marcel Wouda
- Mitja Zastrow (retired after the Beijing Olympics)
- Klaas-Erik Zwering
- Marleen Veldhuis
- Inge Dekker
- Ranomi Kromowidjojo
- Sharon van Rouwendaal
