= Mattias Ohlin =

Swedish swimmer

Personal information
- Full name: Rolf Lennart Mattias Ohlin
- Nationality: Swedish
- Born: 4 February 1978 (age 48) Trelleborg, Sweden
- Height: 1.93 m (6 ft 4 in)

Sport
- Sport: freestyle swimming and backstroke swimming
- Club: Trelleborgs SS
Medal record
European LC Championships
Silver medal – second place	2000 Helsinki	4×100 m medley
Silver medal – second place	2002 Berlin	4×100 m freestyle
World Championships (SC)
Gold medal – first place	2000 Athens	4×100 m freestyle
Silver medal – second place	1999 Hong Kong	4×100 m medley
Bronze medal – third place	1999 Hong Kong	4×100 m freestyle

Mattias Ohlin (born 4 February 1978) is a former international freestyle and backstroke swimmer from Sweden, who participated in two consecutive Summer Olympics for his native country, starting in 2000.

Ohlin is best known for winning the gold medal in the men's 4×100 m freestyle at the 2000 FINA Short Course World Championships in Athens, Greece.
