= Johan Kenkhuis =

Dutch swimmer (born 1980)

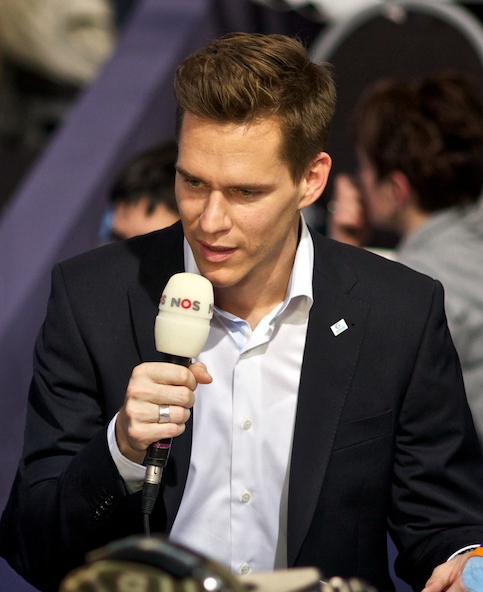
- Johan Kenkhuis at the 2010 European Short Course Swimming Championships in Eindhoven.

Personal information
- Full name: Johan Kenkhuis
- Nationality: Netherlands
- Born: 7 May 1980 (age 46) Vriezenveen, Overijssel, Netherlands

Sport
- Sport: Swimming
- Strokes: Freestyle
Medal record
Men's swimming
Representing the Netherlands
Event	1st	2nd	3rd
Olympic Games	0	1	1
World Championships (LC)	0	1	0
World Championships (SC)	1	1	0
European Championships (LC)	1	0	0
European Championships (SC)	4	1	3
Total	6	4	4
Olympic Games
Silver medal – second place	2004 Athens	4×100 m freestyle
Bronze medal – third place	2000 Sydney	4×200 m freestyle
World Championships (LC)
Silver medal – second place	2001 Fukuoka	4×100 m freestyle
World Championships (SC)
Gold medal – first place	1999 Hong Kong	4×200 m freestyle
Silver medal – second place	1999 Hong Kong	4×100 m freestyle
European Championships (LC)
Gold medal – first place	1999 Istanbul	4×100 m freestyle
European Championships (SC)
Gold medal – first place	1998 Sheffield	4×50 m freestyle
Gold medal – first place	2002 Riesa	4×50 m freestyle
Gold medal – first place	2003 Dublin	4×50 m freestyle
Gold medal – first place	2005 Trieste	4×50 m freestyle
Silver medal – second place	2001 Antwerp	4×50 m freestyle
Bronze medal – third place	2002 Riesa	100 m freestyle
Bronze medal – third place	2005 Trieste	50 m freestyle
Bronze medal – third place	2006 Helsinki	4×50 m freestyle

Johan Kenkhuis (born 7 May 1980 in Vriezenveen, Overijssel) is an Olympic medal winning Dutch swimmer.

From a young age, Kenkhuis had a strong interest in swimming. In 1998, he won gold medals in both the 100 meter and 200 meter freestyle events in the European Junior Championships. At the 2000 Olympic Games in Sydney, Australia, Johan was a member of the bronze medal 4×200 meter freestyle relay team. He also helped the Netherlands win a silver medal at the FINA World Championships in Fukuoka, Japan in 2001 as a member of the 4×100 meter freestyle relay team.

However, by 2002, he was growing tired of the sport and close to retirement. His coach, Fedor Hes, helped him develop a different training strategy which involved spending more time on dry land. Seemingly invigorated by the new training style, Johan quickly progressed enough to win fourth place at the 50 meter freestyle event in the World Championships in Barcelona, Spain. He finished only 0.01 seconds behind the bronze medalist.

In the 2004 Olympic Games, Johan was a member of the Dutch Olympic swim team. As the starting swimmer in the 4×100 meter freestyle relay, alongside Pieter van den Hoogenband, Mitja Zastrow, and Klaas-Erik Zwering he played a critical role in securing a silver medal in the event.

Kenkhuis is currently living in Amsterdam where he is a member of De Dolfijn SPAX swim club but trains with XLence Swimteam. He is a Business and Marketing major at the Johan Cruyff University in Amsterdam.

Kenkhuis was one of only eleven openly gay athletes to participate in the 2004 Olympic Games in Athens. In November 2006 he announced that he would quit swimming on the highest level after the 2006 European Championships Short Course in Helsinki, Finland.

== See also ==
- Dutch records in swimming
- Gay athletes

Awards
Preceded by Edwin de Nijs	Amsterdam Sportsman of the Year; 2003	Succeeded by Michiel Bartman; Diederik Simon
