= Edward Sinclair (swimmer) =

British swimmer

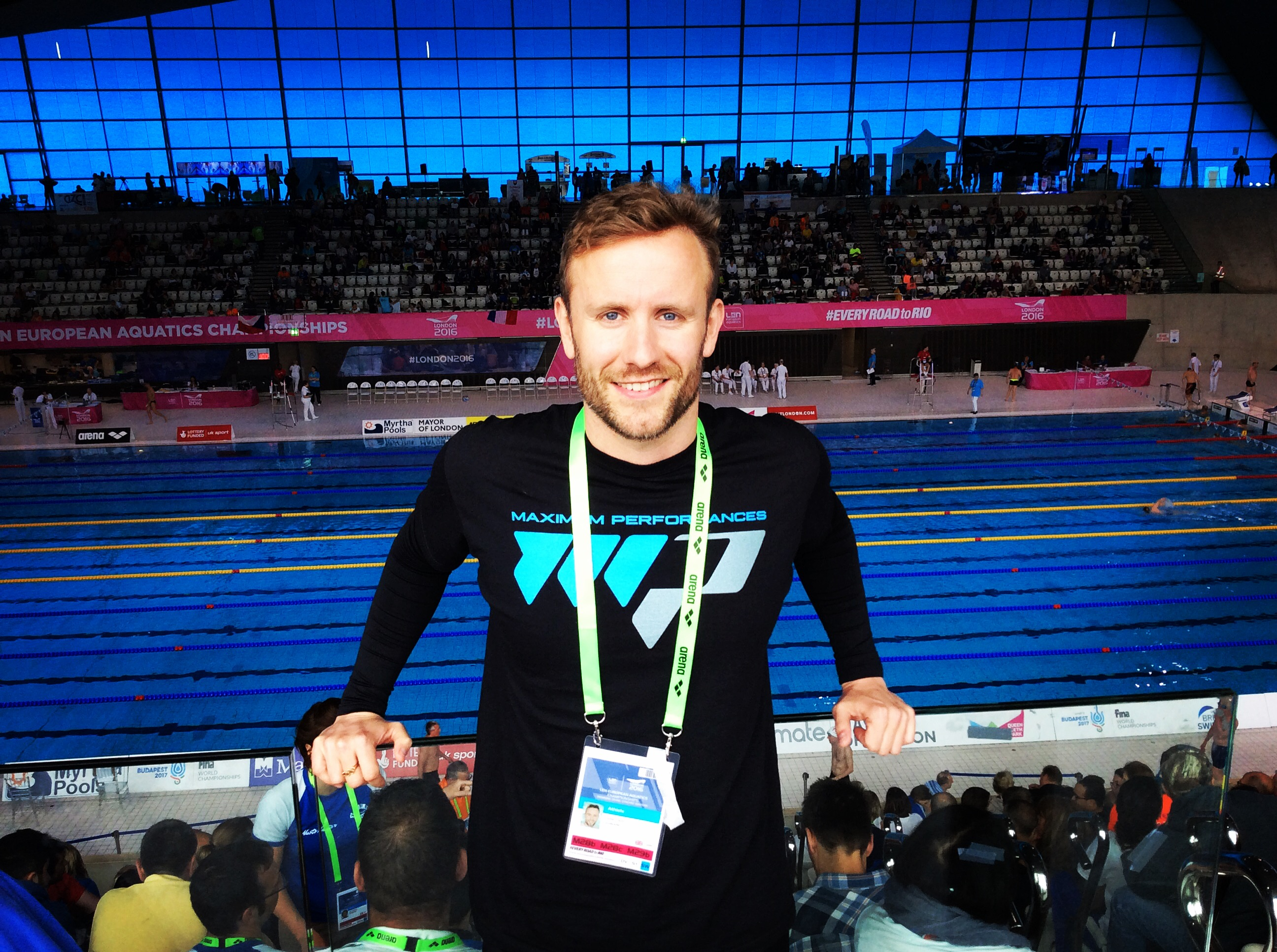
- Sinclair at 2016 European Masters Championships

Personal information
- Born: 1980 (age 45–46)

Sport
- Sport: Swimming
Medal record
Representing Great Britain
World Championships (SC)
Silver medal – second place	1999 Hong Kong	4x200m freestyle relay
Silver medal – second place	2000 Athens	4x200m freestyle relay
European Championships (LC)
Silver medal – second place	1999 Istanbul	4x200m freestyle relay

Edward Sinclair (born 1980) is Double Olympian, World and European medallist and Ex-British and European record holder from Great Britain. He swam on a relay for Great Britain at the 2000 Olympics, and was also a member of the 2004 team.

Sinclair attended Millfield School from 1994 to 1999. After retiring (in 2005) from professional swimming Ed returned to Millfield to begin his coaching career, where he also headed the strength and conditioning programme. From 2009 to 2018, Ed served as the head coach and director of swimming at Teddington Swimming Club. Currently he runs Maximum Performances, works as the lead swimming coach at Guildford High School and works as a consultant for club and school swimming programmes.

In 2022 Edward was head swimming coach on the ITV show The Games, where 12 celebrities took part in Olympic sports. You can still watch the second episode featuring swimming on the ITV Hub - here.

Sinclair's swimming achievements:

- 1999 – 2000 – sets 3 British records: 4 × 200 m Freestyle Relay L.C. – 7.12.98 (1.49.62) – 19/09/00; 200m Freestyle S.C. – 1.45.91 – 17/03/00; 200m Freestyle S.C. – 1.46.22 - 09/12/99
- 1999 – sets British record at European Short Course Championships
- 1999 – Medal Winner World Short Course Championships, Hong Kong – Silver 4 × 200 m Freestyle
- 1999 – European Short Course Championships, Lisbon: Individual British Record 200m Freestyle – 1.46.22; Individual 400m Freestyle – 4th
- 1999 – wins Silver medal at European Aquatics Championships
- 1999 – wins first National title: National Champion 200m Freestyle – Winner of the ASA Alan Hime Memorial Trophy for the best performance at the ASA National Championships
- 1999 – finishes the year ranked 9th in the long course World Ranking (1:48:74)
- 1999 – wins Silver medal at world championships – 4 × 200 m Freestyle Relay
- 2000 – wins Silver medal at world championships – 4 × 200 m Freestyle Relay 7.03.06 (1.45.91)
- 2000 – member of Great Britain's 5th place team in the 4×200 Freestyle Relay at the 2000 Olympics and Individual British Record (1.45.90)
- 2000 – end of year short course world rank: 200 free – 10th (1:45:81), 400 free – 13th (3:44:49)
- 2001 – end of year long course world rank: 400 free – 12th (3:50:53)
- 2001 – Finalist World Championships
- 2003 – Finalist World Championships, Barcelona
- 2004 – Olympic Swim Team 4 × 200 m Freestyle
- 2005 – Speedo League Team Champions
