= Marc Spackman =

English swimmer and coach (born 1979)

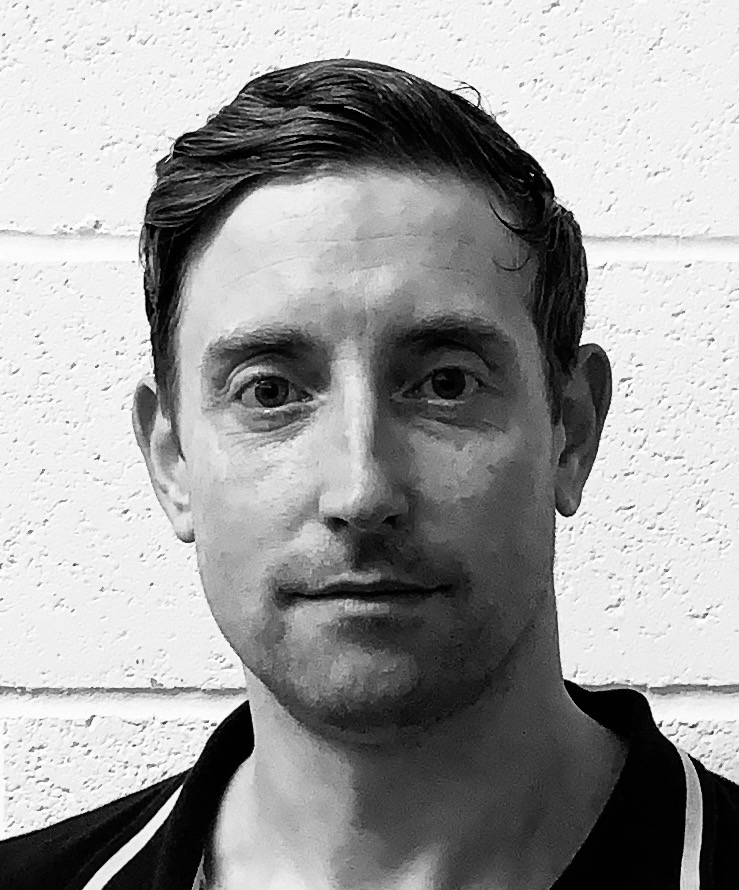

Personal information
- Full name: Marc Nicholas Spackman
- Nationality: British (United Kingdom)
- Born: 1979 (age 46–47) Lincoln, Lincolnshire, England
- Height: 6 ft 3 in (191 cm)
- Weight: 86 kg (190 lb)

Sport
- Sport: Swimming
- Club: City of Lincoln Pentaqua 1984–97
- College team: University of Bath 1997-2004
- Coach: Etobicoke Swim Club (2023–present) (Canada); Royal Wolverhampton School SC (2014–2023) (United Kingdom); Maxwell Swim Club (2012–14) (United Kingdom); Borough of Harrow SC (2009–12) (United Kingdom); Lincoln Vulcans (2006–09) (United Kingdom)

Notable Swimming Results
- World Championships Fukuoka 2001 (Japan) 4th 4x200 Freestyle Relay (time 7:15.60) LC
- Olympic Games Sydney 2000 (Australia) 5th 4x200 Freestyle Relay (time BR 7:12.98) LC
- World Championships Athens 2000 (Greece) 4x200 Freestyle Relay (time ER/BR 7:03.06) SC
- World Championships Hong Kong 1999 (China) 4x200 Freestyle Relay (time 7:07.20) SC
- World Championships Perth 1998 (Australia) 4x200 Freestyle Relay (time BR 7:17.33) LC
- European Junior Championships Glasgow 1997 (Scotland) 4x100 Freestyle Relay (time BJR/EJR 3:24.83) LC; 7th 200 Freestyle 1:52.80 LC

Marc Spackman (born February 1979 in Lincoln, England) is a former England and Great Britain Olympic swimmer who had a successful International career spanning 10 years. Formerly ranked in the World top 20 in the 200 metres Freestyle, he is the current Director of Swimming at ESWIM Etobicoke Swim Club and a coach on The New York Breakers team in the International Swimming League (ISL).

As a professional athlete, Spackman won two major games medals as part of the Men's 4x200 Freestyle Relay in the World Championships (Hong Kong 1999 & Athens 2000 - British & European Record) and as a 17-year-old qualifying for the 4x200 World Long Course Championship relay team that won Bronze in the final. Spackman qualified for and competed in the Sydney 2000 Olympic Games qualifying from the British Championships (Olympic Trials) in July 2000 for the Great Britain Olympic Team. Spackman competed alongside strong competitors and Olympians Paul Palmer and James Salter (both Olympic finalists in their own right). The relay team qualified for the Olympic final from the heats in 7:16.98 and placing fifth in 7:12.54 (a new British Record and fifth fastest all-time) missing out on a medal by 0.2 hundredths of a second.

Spackman competed for the City of Lincoln Pentaqua from 1983 to 1997 and the University of Bath 1997-2003 both under Great Britain Olympic team Head Coach, Ian Turner. After ending his swimming career in 2003, he studied Art and Design foundation degree at the City of Bath College and advanced to Nottingham Trent University to study Graphic Design graduating in 2006 with honours. During University Spackman began coaching at the Lincoln Vulcans swimming club, initially as Assistant Coach and then as Head Coach in 2006.

During this period Spackman's results were outstanding, coaching and developing Elizabeth Simmonds to win Quadruple Gold in the 2007 European Junior Championships (breaking European Junior records), World Championship Silver in a new European Record time and Olympic Qualification (Beijing 2008) in a new British Record on the 200 and 100 meters backstroke. Also working with Paralympic Champion and World Record holder Robert Welbourn and Olympian and European Junior Silver Medalist Sophie Allen. In 2009, he moved on to the Borough of Harrow SC (formerly Harrow and Wealdstone Swimming Club)

In 2014 Spackman became the Elite Performance Coach at the Royal School. Results quickly followed with numerous National Records and International Qualification from athletes in the training program. Outstanding athletes, Alice Dearing, Tom Derbyshire and Matthew Richards all won medals in the European Junior Championships in quick succession. Matthew Richards winning in 2019 in the "Blue Ribbon" 100 Freestyle event in a time of 48.88 and winning the Silver Medal in the 200 Freestyle in a time of 1.47.23. Richards later going on to win Olympic Gold in the 4x200 freestyle relay at the Tokyo Olympics.

Selected as a Coach on the New York Breakers team in the International Swimming League (ISL) Budapest, Hungary 2020 and Naples 2021.

On 1 June 2023, Spackman took over as Head Coach and Director of Swimming at the Etobicoke Swim Club based at the Etobicoke Olympium.

== Notable protégés ==
- Elizabeth Simmonds - Olympic Finalist, European & British Record holder
- Sophie Allen - Olympian, European Junior Silver medalist & British Junior Record holder
- Robert Welbourn - Paralympic Gold medalist, World, European & British Record holder
- Alice Dearing - Olympian, European Junior Champion, World & European Qualifier
- Tom Derbyshire - European Junior Champion, Commonwealth Youth Champion, British Junior Record Holder
- Matthew Richards - Olympic Champion, European Junior Champion, British Junior Record Holder

== Coaching awards ==
- BSCTA Youth Coach of the Year Award
- The Terry Dennison Award for Coaching Excellence
- Lincolnshire Performance Coach of the Year Award
- Lincolnshire Performance Coach of the Year Award

== National team representation ==
- World Junior Championships 2025 (Otopeni)
- European Junior Championships 2025 (Samorin)
- European Championships 2022 (Rome)
- European Junior Championships July 2019 (Kazan)
- USA Grand Prix 2018 (Indianapolis)
- GB World Cup Tour November 2008 (Stockholm/Berlin)
- Beijing Olympics August 2008 (BOA 2012)
- European Junior Championships July 2008 (Belgrade)
- World Championships April 2008 (Manchester)
- European Junior Championships July 2007 (Antwerp)
- World Championships March 2007 (Melbourne)
- European Senior Championships August 2006 (Budapest)
- European Junior Championships July 2006 (Majorca)
