= Leonid Khokhlov =

Russian swimmer

Personal information
- Full name: Leonid Khokhlov
- National team: Russia
- Born: 16 June 1980 (age 46) Ulyanovsk, Russian SFSR, Soviet Union
- Height: 1.94 m (6 ft 4 1/2 in)
- Weight: 79 kg (174 lb)

Sport
- Sport: Swimming
- Strokes: Freestyle
- Club: CSKA Sports Club
Medal record
Men's swimming
Representing Russia
World Championships (SC)
Bronze medal – third place	2002 Moscow	4×100 m freestyle

Leonid Khokhlov (Russian: Леонид Хохлов; born June 16, 1980) is a Russian former swimmer, who specialized in sprint freestyle events. He represented Russia at the 2000 Summer Olympics, and later earned a bronze medal in the freestyle relay at the 2002 FINA Short Course World Championships.

Khokhlov competed only in the men's 4 × 100 m freestyle relay at the 2000 Summer Olympics in Sydney. On the first night of the Games, the Russians were disqualified from the championship final because of an early relay launch from Andrey Kapralov on the lead-off leg. Teaming with Kapralov, Denis Pimankov, and sport legend Alexander Popov on the morning prelims, Khokhlov swam a second leg and recorded a split of 51.02 to post a sixth-seeded time of 3:19.70 for the Russian squad.

At the 2002 FINA Short Course World Championships in Moscow, Khokhlov enjoyed the race of his life in front of a Russian crowd as he shared bronze medals with Kapralov, Pimankov, and Popov in the 4 × 100 m freestyle relay with a time of 3:11.24.
