= Klaus Lanzarini =

Italian swimmer (born 1977)

Personal information
- Full name: Klaus Lanzarini
- Nationality: Italian
- Born: 18 January 1977 (age 49) Latina
- Height: 1.85 m (6 ft 1 in)

Sport
- Sport: Swimming
- Strokes: freestyle
- Club: Gruppo Sportivo Fiamme Gialle; BPAM Montebelluna
Medal record
World Championships (SC)
Gold medal – first place	2006 Shanghai	4×100 m freestyle

Klaus Lanzarini (born 18 January 1977 in Latina) is a former international freestyle swimmer from Italy, who participated at the 2000 Summer Olympics for his native country. He is best known for winning the gold medal in the men's 4 × 100 m freestyle at the 2006 FINA Short Course World Championships in Shanghai, PR China.
