= Andrea Beccari =

Italian swimmer (born 1978)

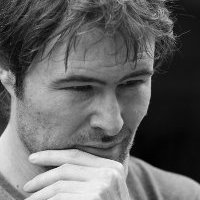

Personal information
- Born: 12 June 1978 (age 48) Moncalieri, Turin, Italy
Medal record
Men's swimming
Representing Italy
World Championships (LC)
Silver medal – second place	2001 Fukuoka	4x200 m freestyle
Summer Universiade
Gold medal – first place	2001 Beijing	4x200m Freestyle
Bronze medal – third place	2003 Daegu	4x200 m freestyle

Andrea Beccari (born 12 June 1978 in Moncalieri, Turin) is an Italian freestyle swimmer. He won several medals mainly as member of the Italian 4 × 200 m freestyle relay. He participated for Italy in the Summer Olympic of Sydney 2000 and Athens 2004.

== See also ==
- Swimming at the 2004 Summer Olympics – Men's 200 metre freestyle
- Italy at the 2000 Summer Olympics
- 2001 World Aquatics Championships
- Swimming at the 2003 Summer Universiade
