= Stefan Herbst =

German swimmer

Personal information
- Nationality: Germany
- Born: 17 May 1978 (age 48) Leipzig, East Germany
- Height: 1.98 m (6 ft 6 in)

Sport
- Sport: Swimming
- Strokes: Freestyle
- Club: SSV Leutzsch e. V.
Medal record
World Championships
| Bronze medal – third place | Fukuoka 2001 | 4x100 m freestyle |
| Bronze medal – third place | Barcelona 2003 | 4x200 m freestyle |
European Championships (LC)
| Gold medal – first place | 2002 Berlin | 4×100 m freestyle |
| Silver medal – second place | 2000 Helsinki | 4×100 m freestyle |
| Silver medal – second place | 2000 Helsinki | 4×200 m freestyle |
| Silver medal – second place | 2002 Berlin | 4×200 m freestyle |
| Bronze medal – third place | 2002 Berlin | 4×100 m medley |
European Championships (SC)
| Gold medal – first place | 2010 Eindhoven | 4x50 m medley |
| Silver medal – second place | 2009 Istanbul | 4x50 m medley |
| Silver medal – second place | 2010 Eindhoven | 4x50 m freestyle |
| Bronze medal – third place | 1999 Lisbon | 200 m freestyle |
| Bronze medal – third place | 2001 Antwerp | 200 m freestyle |
| Bronze medal – third place | 2011 Szczecin | 4×50 m medley |

Stefan Herbst (born 17 May 1978 in Leipzig) is a two-time Olympics swimmer from Germany. He swam for Germany at the 2000 and 2004 Olympics. He is the brother of fellow Olympic swimmer Sabine Herbst and uncle of young swimmer Ramon Klenz.

Stefan made his international swimming debut at the 1998 World Championships. He has competed in Freestyle Relay and Men's 200m Freestyle.
