= Simone Cercato =

Italian swimmer (born 1975)

Medal record

Men's swimming

Representing Italy

Olympic Games
Bronze medal – third place	2004 Athens	4×200 m freestyle

European Championships (LC)
Gold medal – first place	2000 Helsinki	4×200 m freestyle
Bronze medal – third place	2002 Berlin	4×100 m freestyle

Simone Cercato (born 25 February 1975 in Dolo) is a freestyle swimmer from Italy, who won the bronze medal in the men's 4×200 m freestyle event at the 2004 Summer Olympics in Athens, alongside Emiliano Brembilla, Filippo Magnini, and Massimiliano Rosolino. He made his Olympic debut in 2000 (Sydney, Australia).
