= Matteo Pelliciari =

Italian swimmer

Medal record

Men's swimming

Representing Italy

Olympic Games
Bronze medal – third place	2004 Athens	4 x 200 m freestyle

World Championships (LC)
Silver medal – second place	2001 Fukuoka	4 x 200 m freestyle

World Championships (SC)
Gold medal – first place	2006 Shanghai	4 x 200 m freestyle

European Aquatics Championships (LC)
Gold medal – first place	2000 Helsinki	4 x 200 m freestyle
Gold medal – first place	2002 Berlin	4 x 200 m freestyle
Gold medal – first place	2004 Madrid	4 x 200 m freestyle

European Aquatics Championships (SC)
Bronze medal – third place	2002 Riesa	200 m freestyle

Universiades
Gold medal – first place	2001 Beijing	4 x 200 m freestyle
Silver medal – second place	2001 Beijing	200 m freestyle

Mediterranean Games
Gold medal – first place	2001 Tunis	4 x 100 m freestyle
Gold medal – first place	2005 Almería	4 x 200 m freestyle
Silver medal – second place	2001 Tunis	200 m freestyle
Silver medal – second place	2001 Tunis	4 x 200 m freestyle

Matteo Pelliciari (born 22 January 1979 in Milan, Lombardy) is an Italian freestyle Olympic swimmer.

Pelliciari is an Italian Olympic medallist swimmer having competed mainly as a member of the Italian 4 × 200 m freestyle relay team: 2000 Summer Olympics and 2004 Summer Olympics.

== See also ==
- Italy at the 2000 Summer Olympics
