= Dmitry Chernyshyov =

Russian swimmer (born 1975)

Personal information
- Native name: Дмитрий Анатольевич Чернышев
- Born: 25 September 1975 (age 50) Omsk, Russian SFSR, Soviet Union
- Height: 1.84 m (6 ft 0 in)
- Weight: 76 kg (168 lb)

Sport
- Sport: Swimming
- Club: Sibir, Omsk
Medal record
Representing Russia
World Championships (LC)
Bronze medal – third place	2001 Fukuoka	4×100 m medley
World Championships (SC)
Bronze medal – third place	2000 Athens	4×200 m freestyle
European Championships (LC)
Gold medal – first place	2000 Helsinki	4×100 m freestyle
Gold medal – first place	2000 Helsinki	4×100 m medley
Silver medal – second place	1999 Istanbul	4×100 m freestyle
Bronze medal – third place	1999 Istanbul	4×200 m freestyle

Dmitry Anatolyevich Chernyshov (Note: also Tchernychev or Chernychev) (Russian: Дмитрий Анатольевич Чернышев; born 29 September 1975) is a retired Russian swimmer. Between 1999 and 2001 he won six medals in relay events at the European and world championships. His team finished eighth in two freestyle relays at the 2000 Summer Olympics.

He graduated from the Siberian Academy of Physical Culture.
