= 2003–04 FINA Swimming World Cup =

The 2003–04 FINA Swimming World Cup was a series of eight, short course meets organized by FINA and held at eight different international locations. The meets were held from November 2003 through February 2004.

Ed Moses of the United States and Martina Moravcová of Slovakia were the overall male and female winners of the series.

== Meets ==
Year	Dates	Location	Results
2 0 0 3	November 24+25	Daejeon, South Korea	
2 0 0 3	November 28–30	Melbourne, Australia	OmegaTiming
2 0 0 3	December 5–7	Durban, South Africa	OmegaTiming
2 0 0 4
2 0 0 4	January 13+14	Stockholm, Sweden	OmegaTiming
2 0 0 4	January 17+18	Berlin, Germany	OmegaTiming
2 0 0 4	January 21+22	Moscow, Russia	OmegaTiming
2 0 0 4	January 30+31	(United States) New York, USA (actually in East Meadow)	OmegaTiming
2 0 0 4	February 6–8	Rio de Janeiro, Brazil	OmegaTiming

== Event winners ==
Times listed at top of each table represent the series record (WC) as of the start of the 2003/2004 World Cup.

=== 50 Freestyle ===
Men		Meet	Women	
Winner (Nationality) WC: Mark Foster, GBR	Time 21.13	Meet	Winner (Nationality) WC: Alison Sheppard, GBR	Time 24.06
(United States) Robert Zaabadick (USA)	22.29	#1: Daejeon	Katrin Meissner (Germany)	25.21
(United States) Jason Lezak (USA)	21.68	#2: Melbourne	Lisbeth Lenton (Australia)	24.19
Roland Schoeman (South Africa)	21.57	#3: Durban	Martina Moravcová (Slovakia)	25.23
(United States) Jason Lezak (USA)	21.77	#4: Stockholm	Therese Alshammar (Sweden)	24.28
(United States) Jason Lezak (USA)	21.53	#5: Berlin	Therese Alshammar (Sweden)	24.43
(United States) Jason Lezak (USA)	21.60	#6: Moscow	(United States) Courtney Shealy (USA)	25.07
(United States) Jason Lezak (USA)	21.42	#7: New York	(United States) Jenny Thompson (USA)	24.60
José Meolans (Argentina)	21.59	#8: Rio de Janeiro	Flávia Delaroli (Brazil)	24.83

=== 100 Freestyle ===
Men		Meet	Women	
Winner (Nationality) WC: Alexander Popov, RUS	Time 46.74	Meet	Winner (Nationality) WC: Jenny Thompson, USA	Time 53.05
Stefan Herbst (Germany)	48.84	#1: Daejeon	Katrin Meissner (Germany)	54.97
(United States) Jason Lezak (USA)	47.36	#2: Melbourne	Lisbeth Lenton (Australia)	52.64 WC
Roland Schoeman (South Africa)	47.70	#3: Durban	Martina Moravcová (Slovakia)	54.26
(United States) Jason Lezak (USA)	47.24	#4: Stockholm	Martina Moravcová (Slovakia)	54.10
José Meolans (Argentina)	47.61	#5: Berlin	Malia Metella (France)	53.30
Andrey Kapralov (Russia)	47.94	#6: Moscow	Johanna Sjöberg (Sweden)	53.90
(United States) Jason Lezak (USA)	46.98	#7: New York	(United States) Jenny Thompson (USA)	53.63
José Meolans (Argentina)	47.69	#8: Rio de Janeiro	Johanna Sjöberg (Sweden)	53.58

=== 200 Freestyle ===
Men		Meet	Women	
Winner (Nationality) WC: Ian Thorpe, AUS	Time 1:41.10	Meet	Winner (Nationality) WC: YANG Yu, CHN	Time 1:54.90
Stefan Herbst (Germany)	1:45.15	#1: Daejeon	Yana Klochkova (Ukraine)	1:58.78
Nicholas Sprenger (Australia)	1:46.06	#2: Melbourne	(United States) Lindsay Benko (USA)	1:55.27
Ryk Neethling (South Africa)	1:44.05	#3: Durban	Martina Moravcová (Slovakia)	1:56.30
Ryk Neethling (South Africa)	1:43.85	#4: Stockholm	(United Kingdom) Melanie Marshall (Great Britain)	1:55.62
Ryk Neethling (South Africa)	1:44.12	#5: Berlin	Camelia Potec (Romania)	1:56.13
Andrey Kapralov (Russia)	1:46.21	#6: Moscow	Josefin Lillhage (Sweden)	1:56.60
Ryk Neethling (South Africa)	1:43.85	#7: New York	Camelia Potec (Romania)	1:56.78
Dragoş Coman (Romania)	1:46.41	#8: Rio de Janeiro	Camelia Potec (Romania)	1:55.81 NR

=== 400 Freestyle ===
Men		Meet	Women	
Winner (Nationality) WC: Ian Thorpe, AUS	Time 3:34.63	Meet	Winner (Nationality) WC: Lindsay Benko, USA	Time 3:59.53
(United States) Justin Mortimer (USA)	3:50.89	#1: Daejeon	Yana Klochkova (Ukraine)	4:10.66
Nicolas Rostoucher (France)	3:42.06	#2: Melbourne	(United States) Lindsay Benko (USA)	4:02.29
(United States) Chad Carvin (USA)	3:42.91	#3: Durban	Camelia Potec (Romania)	4:08.19
Yuri Prilukov (Russia)	3:41.10	#4: Stockholm	Camelia Potec (Romania)	4:02.99
Ryk Neethling (South Africa)	3:39.91	#5: Berlin	Camelia Potec (Romania)	4:02.00
Yuri Prilukov (Russia)	3:45.19	#6: Moscow	Alena Popchanka (Belarus)	4:07.13
(United States) Chad Carvin (USA)	3:40.87	#7: New York	Sachiko Yamada (Japan)	4:01.36
Dragoş Coman (Romania)	3:44.54	#8: Rio de Janeiro	Camelia Potec (Romania)	4:07.45

=== 1500/800 Freestyle ===
Men (1500 free)		Meet	Women (800 free)	
Winner (Nationality) WC: Grant Hackett, AUS	Time 14:29.51	Meet	Winner (Nationality) WC: CHEN Hua, CHN	Time 8:15.15
(United States) Justin Mortimer (USA)	15:09.48	#1: Daejeon	ZHENG Jing (China)	8:40.79
Kurtis MacGillivary (Canada)	14:50.94	#2: Melbourne	Elka Graham (Australia)	8:17.97
Dragoş Coman (Romania)	14:51.38	#3: Durban	CHEN Hua (China)	8:29.41
Yuri Prilukov (Russia)	14:46.59	#4: Stockholm	(United Kingdom) Rebecca Cooke (Great Britain)	8:23.57
Dragoş Coman (Romania)	14:42.62	#5: Berlin	Erika Villaecija (Spain)	8:18.87
Yuri Prilukov (Russia)	14:47.42	#6: Moscow	Maria Bulakhova (Russia)	8:36.02
Dragoş Coman (Romania)	14:44.69	#7: New York	Sachiko Yamada (Japan)	8:13.66 WC
Dragoş Coman (Romania)	15:06.33	#8: Rio de Janeiro	Camelia Potec (Romania)	8:29.37

=== 50 Backstroke ===
Men		Meet	Women	
Winner (Nationality) WC: Thomas Rupprath, GER	Time 23.49	Meet	Winner (Nationality) WC: LI Hui, CHN	Time 26.83
Steffen Driesen (Germany)	24.44	#1: Daejeon	Mai Nakamura (Japan)	27.87
Matt Welsh (Australia)	23.39 WC	#2: Melbourne	Nicole Seah (Australia)	27.70
Steffen Driesen (Germany)	24.66	#3: Durban	(United States) Haley Cope (USA)	27.83
(United States) Randall Bal (USA)	23.92	#4: Stockholm	GAO Chang (China)	27.61
(United States) Randall Bal (USA)	23.89	#5: Berlin	GAO Chang (China)	27.19
(United States) Randall Bal (USA)	24.06	#6: Moscow	Sophie Edington (Australia)	27.97
(United States) Neil Walker (USA)	23.77	#7: New York	Jennifer Carroll (Canada)	27.69
CAO Xiewei (China)	24.79	#8: Rio de Janeiro	Nam Eun Lee (South Korea)	

=== 100 Backstroke ===
Men		Meet	Women	
Winner (Nationality) WC: Thomas Rupprath, GER	Time 50.58	Meet	Winner (Nationality) WC: Natalie Coughlin, USA	Time 56.71
Steffen Driesen (Germany)	52.76	#1: Daejeon	Mai Nakamura (Japan)	59.48
Matt Welsh (Australia)	51.13	#2: Melbourne	Mai Nakamura (Japan)	59.15
Steffen Driesen (Germany)	52.28	#3: Durban	Ilona Hlaváčková (Czech Republic)	58.82
(United States) Randall Bal (USA)	51.61	#4: Stockholm	GAO Chang (China)	58.49
Thomas Rupprath (Germany)	51.47	#5: Berlin	GAO Chang (China)	58.45
(United States) Randall Bal (USA)	52.18	#6: Moscow	(United States) Courtney Shealy (USA)	59.90
(United States) Randall Bal (USA)	52.08	#7: New York	(United Kingdom) Sarah Price (Great Britain)	1:00.39
Răzvan Florea (Romania)	53.35	#8: Rio de Janeiro	Charlene Wittstock (South Africa)	1:00.87

=== 200 Backstroke ===
Men		Meet	Women	
Winner (Nationality) WC: Gordan Kožulj, CRO	Time 1:51.62	Meet	Winner (Nationality) WC: Natalie Coughlin, USA	Time 2:03.62
Gordan Kožulj (Croatia)	1:55.02	#1: Daejeon	Yana Klochkova (Ukraine)	2:10.88
(United States) Michael Phelps (USA)	1:51.40 WC	#2: Melbourne	(United States) Margaret Hoelzer (USA)	2:05.47
Steffen Driesen (Germany)	1:54.86	#3: Durban	Melissa Corfe (South Africa)	2:10.50
Evgeny Aleshin (Russia)	1:53.21	#4: Stockholm	Reiko Nakamura (Japan)	2:06.65
Tomomi Morita (Japan)	1:54.24	#5: Berlin	Reiko Nakamura (Japan)	2:05.99
Evgeny Aleshin (Russia)	1:53.70	#6: Moscow	Stanislava Komarova (Russia)	2:06.59
Răzvan Florea (Romania)	1:53.80	#7: New York	Elizabeth Warden (Canada)	2:08.19
Răzvan Florea (Romania)	1:55.01	#8: Rio de Janeiro	Yana Klochkova (Ukraine)	2:09.40

=== 50 Breaststroke ===
Men		Meet	Women	
Winner (Nationality) WC: Oleg Lisogor, UKR	Time 26.20	Meet	Winner (Nationality) WC: Zoë Baker, GBR	Time 30.21
Roman Sludnov (Russia)	28.08	#1: Daejeon	Mirna Jukić (Austria)	31.40
Brenton Rickard (Australia)	27.17	#2: Melbourne	Brooke Hanson (Australia)	30.24 WC
Oleg Lisogor (Ukraine)	26.97	#3: Durban	(United States) Staciana Stitts (USA)	31.60
(United States) Ed Moses (USA)	27.10	#4: Stockholm	(United States) Kristy Kowal (USA)	31.18
(United States) Ed Moses (USA)	26.68	#5: Berlin	(United States) Kristy Kowal (USA)	30.94
(United States) Ed Moses (USA); Roman Sludnov (Russia)	27.44	#6: Moscow	(United States) Kristy Kowal (USA)	31.10
(United States) Ed Moses (USA)	26.85	#7: New York	(United States) Gabrielle Rose (USA)	31.34
(United States) Mark Gangloff (USA)	27.63	#8: Rio de Janeiro	(United States) Amanda Beard (USA)	30.99

=== 100 Breaststroke ===
Men		Meet	Women	
Winner (Nationality) WC: Ed Moses, USA	Time 57.47	Meet	Winner (Nationality) WC: Emma Igelström, SWE	Time 1:05.55
You Seung-Hun (South Korea)	1:00.82	#1: Daejeon	Mirna Jukić (Austria)	1:07.76
Brenton Rickard (Australia)	59.00	#2: Melbourne	Leisel Jones (Australia)	1:05.09 WR
Oleg Lisogor (Ukraine)	59.69	#3: Durban	(United States) Staciana Stitts (USA)	1:07.63
(United States) Ed Moses (USA)	58.08	#4: Stockholm	Emma Igelström (Sweden)	1:06.96
(United States) Ed Moses (USA)	58.23	#5: Berlin	Mirna Jukić (Austria)	1:06.75
(United States) Ed Moses (USA)	59.33	#6: Moscow	Elena Bogomazova (Russia)	1:07.79
(United States) Ed Moses (USA)	57.96	#7: New York	Masami Tanaka (Japan)	1:07.16
Eduardo Fischer (Brazil)	1:00.11	#8: Rio de Janeiro	(United States) Amanda Beard (USA)	1:06.53

=== 200 Breaststroke ===
Men		Meet	Women	
Winner (Nationality) WC: Ed Moses, USA	Time 2:03.17	Meet	Winner (Nationality) WC: QI Hui, CHN	Time 2:18.86
You Seung-Hun (South Korea)	2:14.43	#1: Daejeon	Mirna Jukić (Austria)	2:23.19
(United States) Ed Moses (USA)	2:07.84	#2: Melbourne	Leisel Jones (Australia)	2:17.75 WR
Terence Parkin (South Africa)	2:10.12	#3: Durban	LUO Nan (China)	2:24.75
(United States) Ed Moses (USA)	2:04.54	#4: Stockholm	Mirna Jukić (Austria)	2:23.36
(United States) Ed Moses (USA)	2:02.92 WR	#5: Berlin	Mirna Jukić (Austria)	2:22.79
(United States) Ed Moses (USA)	2:08.27	#6: Moscow	Ekaterina Kormacheva (Russia)	2:27.43
(United States) Ed Moses (USA)	2:04.61	#7: New York	Masami Tanaka (Japan)	2:21.20
Hugues Duboscq (France)	2:12.19	#8: Rio de Janeiro	(United States) Amanda Beard (USA)	2:23.74

=== 50 Butterfly ===
Men		Meet	Women	
Winner (Nationality) WC: Geoff Huegill, AUS	Time 22.74	Meet	Winner (Nationality) WC: Anna-Karin Kammerling, SWE	Time 25.36
Ravil Nachaev (Uzbekistan)	24.19	#1: Daejeon	Danni Miatke (Australia)	27.08
Geoff Huegill (Australia)	23.46	#2: Melbourne	Petria Thomas (Australia)	26.20
Roland Schoeman (South Africa)	23.25	#3: Durban	Martina Moravcová (Slovakia)	26.53
Mike Mintenko (Canada)	23.75	#4: Stockholm	Anna-Karin Kammerling (Sweden)	25.98
Andriy Serdinov (Ukraine)	23.36	#5: Berlin	Petria Thomas (Australia)	26.06
Nikolay Skvortsov (Russia)	23.80	#6: Moscow	Johanna Sjöberg (Sweden)	26.55
Roland Schoeman (South Africa)	23.04	#7: New York	(United States) Jenny Thompson (USA)	26.04
Kaio Almeida (Brazil)	23.77	#8: Rio de Janeiro	Johanna Sjöberg (Sweden)	26.39

=== 100 Butterfly ===
Men		Meet	Women	
Winner (Nationality) WC: Thomas Rupprath, GER	Time 50.10	Meet	Winner (Nationality) WC: Natalie Coughlin, USA	Time 56.34
Igor Marchenko (Russia)	52.99	#1: Daejeon	Kate Corkran (Australia)	1:00.17
(United States) Michael Phelps (USA)	51.11	#2: Melbourne	Petria Thomas (Australia)	57.27
Ryk Neethling (South Africa)	51.90	#3: Durban	Martina Moravcová (Slovakia)	57.58
Andriy Serdinov (Ukraine)	51.66	#4: Stockholm	Martina Moravcová (Slovakia)	56.90
Thomas Rupprath (Germany)	50.79	#5: Berlin	Martina Moravcová (Slovakia)	56.93
Nikolay Skvortsov (Russia)	51.42	#6: Moscow	Johanna Sjöberg (Sweden)	58.54
(United States) Ben Michaelson (USA)	51.42	#7: New York	Martina Moravcová (Slovakia) (United States) Jenny Thompson (USA)	57.87
Johannes Dietrich (Germany)	52.39	#8: Rio de Janeiro	Johanna Sjöberg (Sweden)	58.33

=== 200 Butterfly ===
Men		Meet	Women	
Winner (Nationality) WC: James Hickman, GBR	Time 1:51.76	Meet	Winner (Nationality) WC: Susie O'Neill, AUS	Time 2:04.16
(United States) Kellan O'Connor (USA)	1:57.97	#1: Daejeon	Park Kyung-Hwa (South Korea)	2:11.82
(United States) Michael Phelps (USA)	1:52.27	#2: Melbourne	Petria Thomas (Australia)	2:06.71
WU Peng (China)	1:56.09	#3: Durban	XU Yanwei (China)	2:07.79
Takeshi Matsuda (Japan)	1:53.67	#4: Stockholm	Petria Thomas (Australia)	2:08.16
Ioan Gherghel (Romania)	1:53.94	#5: Berlin	YANG Yu (China)	2:04.04 WR
Nikolay Skvortsov (Russia)	1:54.21	#6: Moscow	Ekaterina Vinogradova (Russia)	2:11.40
(United States) Michael Raab (USA)	1:56.28	#7: New York	(United States) Georgina Lee (USA)	2:08.03
Ioan Gherghel (Romania)	1:55.64	#8: Rio de Janeiro	Yana Klochkova (Ukraine)	2:09.50

=== 100 Individual Medley ===
Men		Meet	Women	
Winner (Nationality) WC: Thomas Rupprath, GER	Time 52.58	Meet	Winner (Nationality) WC: Natalie Coughlin, USA	Time 58.80
Stefan Herbst (Germany)	54.89	#1: Daejeon	Yana Klochkova (Ukraine)	1:03.25
(United States) Michael Phelps (USA)	53.30	#2: Melbourne	Brooke Hanson (Australia)	1:00.47
Oleg Lisogor (Ukraine)	55.09	#3: Durban	Martina Moravcová (Slovakia)	1:01.63
Kosuke Kitajima (Japan)	53.71	#4: Stockholm	Martina Moravcová (Slovakia)	1:00.32
Marco di Carli (Germany)	54.33	#5: Berlin	Martina Moravcová (Slovakia)	1:00.68
Dzianis Silkou (Belarus)	55.73	#6: Moscow	Yana Klochkova (Ukraine)	1:02.36
(United States) Neil Walker (USA)	53.67	#7: New York	(United States) Gabrielle Rose (USA)	1:00.54
(Trinidad and Tobago) George Bovell (Trinidad & Tobago)	54.35	#8: Rio de Janeiro	(United States) Amanda Beard (USA)	1:01.85

=== 200 Individual Medley ===
Men		Meet	Women	
Winner (Nationality) WC: Jani Sievinen, FIN	Time 1:55.44	Meet	Winner (Nationality) WC: Yana Klochkova, UKR	Time 2:08.44
Peter Mankoč (Slovenia)	1:58.90	#1: Daejeon	Yana Klochkova (Ukraine)	2:14.49
(United States) Michael Phelps (USA)	1:54.85 WC	#2: Melbourne	(United States) Amanda Beard (USA)	2:09.48
Lucas Salatta (Brazil)	1:58.68	#3: Durban	ZHANG Tianyi (China)	2:12.03
Kosuke Kitajima (Japan)	1:56.68	#4: Stockholm	ZHOU Yafei (China)	2:11.05
Brian Johns (Canada)	1:56.09	#5: Berlin	YANG Yu (China)	2:10.01
LIU Veijia (China)	2:00.19	#6: Moscow	Yana Klochkova (Ukraine)	2:11.08
Peter Mankoč (Slovenia)	1:59.21	#7: New York	Yana Klochkova (Ukraine)	2:09.79
(Trinidad and Tobago) George Bovell (Trinidad & Tobago)	1:57.57	#8: Rio de Janeiro	Yana Klochkova (Ukraine)	2:09.75

=== 400 Individual Medley ===
Men		Meet	Women	
Winner (Nationality) WC: Marcel Wouda, NED	Time 4:05.41	Meet	Winner (Nationality) WC: Yana Klochkova, UKR	Time 4:27.83
Han Kyu-Chul (South Korea)	4:14.02	#1: Daejeon	Yana Klochkova (Ukraine)	4:43.40
(United States) Michael Phelps (USA)	4:06.28	#2: Melbourne	Jennifer Reilly (Australia)	4:37.27
Thiago Pereira (Brazil)	4:10.93	#3: Durban	ZHANG Tianyi (China)	4:38.19
Brian Johns (Canada)	4:09.92	#4: Stockholm	ZHOU Yafei (China)	4:35.46
Alessio Boggiatto (Italy)	4:06.37	#5: Berlin	ZHOU Yafei (China)	4:34.85
Aleksey Kovrigin (Russia)	4:13.44	#6: Moscow	Yana Klochkova (Ukraine)	4:39.34
(United States) Chad Carvin (USA)	4:11.78	#7: New York	Yana Klochkova (Ukraine)	4:33.58
Christian Keller (Germany)	4:15.40	#8: Rio de Janeiro	Yana Klochkova (Ukraine)	4:38.15
