= 2001–02 FINA Swimming World Cup =

The 2001–02 FINA Swimming World Cup was a series of nine international short course (25m) swimming meets organized by FINA. The meets were held in nine different cities, from November 2001 through January 2002. Each featured 34 events: seventeen for males and seventeen for females.

Ed Moses of the United States and Martina Moravcová of Slovakia were the overall male and female winners of the series. The 2001–2002 World Cup saw 22 world records bettered.

== Meets ==
Dates and locations for the 2001–2002 World Cup meets were:

Year	Dates	Location	Results
2 0 0 1
2 0 0 1	November 16–18	Rio de Janeiro, Brazil	
2 0 0 1	November 23–24	Edmonton, Canada	
2 0 0 1	November 27–28	(United States) New York, USA	
2 0 0 1	December 2–3	Shanghai, China	Omega Timing
2 0 0 1	December 7–9	(Australia) Melbourne	Omega Timing
2 0 0 2
2 0 0 2	January 14–15	Imperia, Italy	Omega Timing
2 0 0 2	January 18–19	Paris, France	
2 0 0 2	January 22–23	Stockholm, Sweden	Omega Timing
2 0 0 2	January 26–27	Berlin, Germany	Omega Timing

== Event winners ==
=== 50 freestyle ===
Men		Meet	Women	
Winner (Nationality) WC: Mark Foster, GBR	Time 21.13	Meet	Winner (Nationality) WC: Therese Alshammar, SWE	Time 24.39
José Meolans (Argentina)	21.91	#1: Rio de Janeiro	Johanna Sjöberg (Sweden)	24.85
José Meolans (Argentina)	21.85	#2: Edmonton	(United Kingdom) Alison Sheppard (Great Britain)	24.53
(United States) Jason Lezak (USA)	21.86	#3: New York	Martina Moravcová (Slovakia)	25.14
Denis Pimankov (Russia)	22.35	#4: Shanghai	Zhou Xiaowei (China)	24.92
(United States) Jason Lezak (USA)	21.75	#5: Melbourne	Sarah Ryan (Australia)	25.27
Bartosz Kizierowski (Poland)	21.86	#6: Imperia	Ekaterina Kibalo (Russia)	25.23
(United States) Jason Lezak (USA)	21.64	#7: Paris	Martina Moravcová (Slovakia)	24.95
(United States) Jason Lezak (USA)	21.57	#8: Stockholm	Therese Alshammar (Sweden)	24.76
(United Kingdom) Mark Foster (Great Britain)	21.51	#9: Berlin	Xu Yanwei (China)	24.91

=== 100 freestyle ===
Men		Meet	Women	
Winner (Nationality) WC: Alexander Popov, RUS	Time 46.74	Meet	Winner (Nationality) WC: Jenny Thompson, USA	Time 53.05
José Meolans (Argentina)	48.05	#1: Rio de Janeiro	Johanna Sjöberg (Sweden)	54.26
José Meolans (Argentina)	47.74	#2: Edmonton	Martina Moravcová (Slovakia)	53.82
(United States) Jason Lezak (USA)	47.67	#3: New York	Martina Moravcová (Slovakia)	54.04
Denis Pimankov (Russia)	48.29	#4: Shanghai	Martina Moravcová (Slovakia)	53.93
(United States) Jason Lezak (USA)	47.79	#5: Melbourne	(United States) Lindsay Benko (USA)	54.50
Gustavo Borges (Brazil)	47.73	#6: Imperia	Claudia Poll (Costa Rica)	55.01
(United States) Jason Lezak (USA)	47.44	#7: Paris	Martina Moravcová (Slovakia)	53.90
(United States) Jason Lezak (USA)	47.25	#8: Stockholm	Martina Moravcová (Slovakia)	53.40
(United States) Jason Lezak (USA)	47.30	#9: Berlin	Martina Moravcová (Slovakia)	53.67

=== 200 freestyle ===
Men		Meet	Women	
Winner (Nationality) WC: Ian Thorpe, AUS	Time 1:41.10	Meet	Winner (Nationality) WC: YANG Yu, CHN	Time 1:55.50
Rick Say (Canada)	1:45.84	#1: Rio de Janeiro	(United States) Lindsay Benko (USA)	1:57.54
Rick Say (Canada)	1:45.59	#2: Edmonton	Martina Moravcová (Slovakia)	1:55.92
Romain Barnier (France)	1:46.13	#3: New York	Martina Moravcová (Slovakia)	1:55.41 WC
Liu Yu (China)	1:46.94	#4: Shanghai	Yang Yu (China)	1:56.42
Michael Klim (Australia)	1:44.24	#5: Melbourne	Elka Graham (Australia)	1:56.12
Gustavo Borges (Brazil)	1:45.04	#6: Imperia	Yang Yu (China)	1:56.05
Pieter van den Hoogenband (Netherlands)	1:44.49	#7: Paris	Yang Yu (China)	1:55.81
Pieter van den Hoogenband (Netherlands)	1:43.85	#8: Stockholm	Solenne Figuès (France)	1:56.38
Pieter van den Hoogenband (Netherlands)	1:43.81	#9: Berlin	(United States) Lindsay Benko (USA)	1:55.16 WC

=== 400 freestyle ===
Men		Meet	Women	
Winner (Nationality) WC: Ian Thorpe, AUS	Time 3:35.75	Meet	Winner (Nationality) WC: Sarah-Jane D'Arcy, AUS	Time 4:03.50
Rick Say (Canada)	3:45.55	#1: Rio de Janeiro	(United States) Lindsay Benko (USA)	4:07.84
Rick Say (Canada)	3:42.42	#2: Edmonton	Chen Hua (China)	4:07.45
(United States) Josh Davis (USA)	3:46.05	#3: New York	Claudia Poll (Costa Rica)	4:07.37
Ji Zhixiang (China)	3:51.17	#4: Shanghai	Chen Hua (China)	4:02.80 WC
(United States) Chad Carvin (USA)	3:44.18	#5: Melbourne	(United States) Lindsay Benko (USA)	4:03.38
Massi Rosolino (Italy)	3:42.50	#6: Imperia	Claudia Poll (Costa Rica)	4:08.60
Rick Say (Canada)	3:42.19	#7: Paris	Claudia Poll (Costa Rica)	4:05.98
Rick Say (Canada)	3:41.99	#8: Stockholm	Yana Klochkova (Ukraine)	4:07.29
Massi Rosolino (Italy)	3:43.38	#9: Berlin	(United States) Lindsay Benko (USA)	4:00.30 WC

=== 1500/800 freestyle ===
Men (1500 free)		Meet	Women (800 free)	
Winner (Nationality) WC: Grant Hackett, AUS	Time 14:29.52	Meet	Winner (Nationality) WC: Sachiko Yamada, JPN	Time 8:17.76
Rick Say (Canada)	15:11.54	#1: Rio de Janeiro	Nayara Ribeiro (Brazil)	8:35.02
Rick Say (Canada)	15:05.72	#2: Edmonton	Chen Hua (China)	8:46.43
(United States) Chris Thompson (USA)	14:50.92	#3: New York	Chen Hua (China)	8:18.50
Yu Chen (China)	15:05.06	#4: Shanghai	Chen Hua (China)	8:15.50 WR
Daniel Kowalski (Australia)	15:03.33	#5: Melbourne	Amanda Pascoe (Australia)	8:21.27
Christian Minotti (Italy)	14:56.16	#6: Imperia	Alexandra Malanina (Russia)	8:30.28
Dragoș Coman (Romania)	14:56.80	#7: Paris	Amanda Pascoe (Australia)	8:19.54
Han Kyu-chul (South Korea)	14:55.90	#8: Stockholm	Amanda Pascoe (Australia)	8:23.99
Han Kyu-chul (South Korea)	14:54.38	#9: Berlin	Amanda Pascoe (Australia)	8:17.64

=== 50 Backstroke ===
Men		Meet	Women	
Winner (Nationality) WC: Matt Welsh, AUS	Time 24.11	Meet	Winner (Nationality) WC: BJ Bedford, USA	Time 27.62
(United States) Michael Gilliam (USA)	24.64	#1: Rio de Janeiro	(United States) Diana MacManus (USA)	28.34
(United States) Michael Gilliam (USA)	24.94	#2: Edmonton	Jennifer Carroll (Canada)	27.92
(United States) Neil Walker (USA)	24.42	#3: New York	(United States) Natalie Coughlin (USA)	27.29 WC
Cao Xuewei (China)	25.00	#4: Shanghai	Li Hui (China)	26.83 WR
Matt Welsh (Australia)	24.34	#5: Melbourne	Janine Pietsch (Germany)	28.00
Ante Mašković (Croatia)	24.54	#6: Imperia	Zhan Shu (China)	28.30
Ante Mašković (Croatia)	24.69	#7: Paris	Jennifer Carroll (Canada)	27.41
(United States) Michael Gilliam (USA)	24.50	#8: Stockholm	Jennifer Carroll (Canada)	27.31
Stev Theloke (Germany)	24.05 WC	#9: Berlin	Jennifer Carroll (Canada)	27.26

=== 100 Backstroke ===
Men		Meet	Women	
Winner (Nationality) WC: Lenny Krayzelburg, USA	Time 51.28	Meet	Winner (Nationality) WC: BJ Bedford, USA	Time 58.89
Sebastian Halgasch (Germany)	53.94	#1: Rio de Janeiro	(United States) Diana MacManus (USA)	1:00.76
(United States) Michael Gilliam (USA)	53.61	#2: Edmonton	Janine Pietsch (Germany)	1:00.41
(United States) Neil Walker (USA)	52.71	#3: New York	(United States) Natalie Coughlin (USA)	57.08 WR
Gordan Kožulj (Croatia)	54.25	#4: Shanghai	Li Hui (China)	58.96
Toni Helbig (Germany)	53.26	#5: Melbourne	Charlene Wittstock (South Africa)	1:00.16
Evgeny Aleshin (Russia)	53.21	#6: Imperia	Zhan Shu (China)	1:00.49
Sung Min (South Korea)	53.15	#7: Paris	Jennifer Carroll (Canada)	59.74
(United States) Michael Gilliam (USA)	52.69	#8: Stockholm	(United States) Haley Cope (USA)	59.66
Thomas Rupprath (Germany)	51.35	#9: Berlin	(United States) Haley Cope (USA)	59.19

=== 200 Backstroke ===
Men		Meet	Women	
Winner (Nationality) WC: Gordan Kožulj, CRO	Time 1:51.62	Meet	Winner (Nationality) WC: Clementine Stoney, AUS	Time 2:06.70
Rogério Romero (Brazil)	1:56.16	#1: Rio de Janeiro	(United States) Lindsay Benko (USA)	2:08.42
Rogério Romero (Brazil)	1:55.33	#2: Edmonton	Jennifer Fratesi (Canada)	2:07.73
(United States) Neil Walker (USA)	1:56.38	#3: New York	(United States) Natalie Coughlin (USA)	2:03.62 WR
Wu Peng (China)	1:56.82	#4: Shanghai	Ma Weimiao (China)	2:10.80
Matt Welsh (Australia)	1:54.23	#5: Melbourne	Clementine Stoney (Australia)	2:06.80
Evgeny Aleshin (Russia)	1:54.79	#6: Imperia	Stanislava Komarova (Russia)	2:09.27
Sung Min (South Korea)	1:54.65	#7: Paris	Stanislava Komarova (Russia)	2:09.69
Simon Dufour (France)	1:54.41	#8: Stockholm	Charlene Wittstock (South Africa)	2:09.72
Simon Dufour (France)	1:54.14	#9: Berlin	(United States) Lindsay Benko (USA)	2:06.86

=== 50 Breaststroke ===
Men		Meet	Women	
Winner (Nationality) WC: Mark Warnecke, GER	Time 26.97	Meet	Winner (Nationality) WC: HAN Xue, CHN	Time 30.77
Oleg Lisogor (Ukraine)	27.22	#1: Rio de Janeiro	Emma Igelström (Sweden)	31.34
Morgan Knabe (Canada)	27.81	#2: Edmonton	Luo Xuejuan (China)	30.71 WC
(United States) Ed Moses (USA)	27.53	#3: New York	Luo Xuejan (China)	30.68 WC
Roman Sloudnov (Russia)	26.90 WC	#4: Shanghai	Luo Xuejan (China); Li Wei (China)	30.56 WR
Jim Piper (Australia)	27.92	#5: Melbourne	(United Kingdom) Zoë Baker (Great Britain)	30.61
Oleg Lisogor (Ukraine)	26.96	#6: Imperia	(United Kingdom) Zoë Baker (Great Britain)	30.51 WR
(United States) Ed Moses (USA)	26.74 WC	#7: Paris	Luo Xuejan (China)	30.47 WR
(United States) Ed Moses (USA)	26.28 WR	#8: Stockholm	Emma Igelström (Sweden)	30.43 WR
Oleg Lisogor (Ukraine)	26.20 WR	#9: Berlin	(United Kingdom) Zoë Baker (Great Britain)	30.31 WR

=== 100 Breaststroke ===
Men		Meet	Women	
Winner (Nationality) WC: Dmitry Volkov, RUS	Time 59.30	Meet	Winner (Nationality) WC: Luo Xuejuan, CHN	Time 1:06.18
Roman Sloudnov (Russia)	58.76	#1: Rio de Janeiro	Rhiannon Leier (Canada)	1:09.09
Morgan Knabe (Canada)	59.94 WC	#2: Edmonton	Luo Xuejuan (China)	1:06.37
(United States) Ed Moses (USA)	1:00.14	#3: New York	Luo Xuejuan (China)	1:05.78 WC
Roman Sloudnov (Russia)	58.57 WC	#4: Shanghai	Luo Xuejuan (China)	1:06.22
(United States) Ed Moses (USA)	59.29	#5: Melbourne	(United States) Amanda Beard (USA)	1:07.27
Oleg Lisogor (Ukraine)	59.70	#6: Imperia	Luo Xuejuan (China)	1:06.49
Roman Sloudnov (Russia)	58.08 WC	#7: Paris	Luo Xuejuan (China)	1:06.39
(United States) Ed Moses (USA)	57.47 WR	#8: Stockholm	Emma Igelström (Sweden)	1:06.21
(United States) Ed Moses (USA)	57.67	#9: Berlin	Emma Igelström (Sweden)	1:06.14

=== 200 Breaststroke ===
Men		Meet	Women	
Winner (Nationality) WC: Jim Piper, AUS	Time 2:07.69	Meet	Winner (Nationality) WC: Qi Hui, CHN	Time 2:19.25
Morgan Knabe (Canada)	2:09.50	#1: Rio de Janeiro	Emma Igelström (Sweden)	2:27.42
Morgan Knabe (Canada)	2:08.71	#2: Edmonton	Sarah Poewe (South Africa)	2:26.50
Jim Piper (Australia)	2:09.58	#3: New York	Anne Poleska (Germany)	2:22.90
Roman Sloudnov (Russia)	2:09.75	#4: Shanghai	Qi Hui (China)	2:23.96
(United States) Ed Moses (USA)	2:07.59 WC	#5: Melbourne	(United States) Amanda Beard (USA)	2:23.47
Dimitri Komornikov (Russia)	2:08.34	#6: Imperia	Olga Bakaldina (Russia)	2:25.79
(United States) Ed Moses (USA)	2:04.37 WR	#7: Paris	(United States) Amanda Beard (USA)	2:22.89
(United States) Ed Moses (USA)	2:03.26 WR	#8: Stockholm	Qi Hui (China)	2:20.87
(United States) Ed Moses (USA)	2:03.17 WR	#9: Berlin	Qi Hui (China)	2:21.31

=== 50 Butterfly ===
Men		Meet	Women	
Winner (Nationality) WC: Mark Foster, GBR	Time 22.87	Meet	Winner (Nationality) WC: Anna-Karin Kammerling, SWE	Time 25.36
Raphael De Thuin (Brazil)	23.84	#1: Rio de Janeiro	Johanna Sjöberg (Sweden)	26.68
Geoff Huegill (Australia)	23.05	#2: Edmonton	Martina Moravcová (Slovakia)	26.62
Geoff Huegill (Australia)	23.16	#3: New York	(United States) Natalie Coughlin (USA)	25.83
Zhang Qiang (China)	24.10	#4: Shanghai	Johanna Sjöberg (Sweden)	26.78
Geoff Huegill (Australia)	22.84 WR	#5: Melbourne	(United States) Rachel Komisarz (USA)	26.77
Igor Marchenko (Russia)	23.82	#6: Imperia	Nadine Rolland (Canada)	27.40
Geoff Huegill (Australia)	23.03	#7: Paris	Martina Moravcová (Slovakia)	26.56
Geoff Huegill (Australia)	22.84 WR	#8: Stockholm	Anna-Karin Kammerling (Sweden)	25.50
Geoff Huegill (Australia)	22.80 *	#9: Berlin	Anna-Karin Kammerling (Sweden)	26.06

* In prelims of the Berlin meet, Huegill swam a 22.74 to lower the World and Cup records again.

=== 100 Butterfly ===
Men		Meet	Women	
Winner (Nationality) WC: Michael Klim, AUS	Time 51.07	Meet	Winner (Nationality) WC: Jenny Thompson, USA	Time 56.80
Theo Verster (South Africa)	53.54	#1: Rio de Janeiro	Johanna Sjöberg (Sweden)	58.29
Geoff Huegill (Australia)	51.04 WC	#2: Edmonton	Martina Moravcová (Slovakia)	58.41
Geoff Huegill (Australia)	51.64	#3: New York	Martina Moravcová (Slovakia)	57.43
Wang Hongwei (China)	53.68	#4: Shanghai	Martina Moravcová (Slovakia)	57.74
Geoff Huegill (Australia)	50.71 WC	#5: Melbourne	(United States) Rachel Komisarz (USA)	57.45
Igor Marchenko (Russia)	51.90	#6: Imperia	Mette Jacobsen (Denmark)	1:00.43
Geoff Huegill (Australia)	51.55	#7: Paris	Martina Moravcová (Slovakia)	57.09
Geoff Huegill (Australia)	50.79	#8: Stockholm	Martina Moravcová (Slovakia)	56.86
Thomas Rupprath (Germany)	50.10 WR	#9: Berlin	Martina Moravcová (Slovakia)	56.55 WR

=== 200 Butterfly ===
Men		Meet	Women	
Winner (Nationality) WC: James Hickman, GBR	Time 1:51.76	Meet	Winner (Nationality) WC: Susie O'Neill, AUS	Time 2:04.16
Kaio de Almeida (Brazil)	1:57.43	#1: Rio de Janeiro	Mandy Loots (South Africa)	2:11.88
Takashi Yamamoto (Japan)	1:55.75	#2: Edmonton	Jennifer Button (Canada)	2:11.28
Franck Esposito (France)	1:54.02	#3: New York	(United States) Mary DeScenza (USA)	2:08.24
Wang Hongwei (China)	1:56.69	#4: Shanghai	Yang Yu (China)	2:07.54
Justin Norris (Australia)	1:54.43	#5: Melbourne	Yana Klochkova (Ukraine)	2:09.30
Anatoly Polyakov (Russia)	1:54.62	#6: Imperia	YANG Yu (China)	2:07.41
Anatoly Polyakov (Russia)	1:55.20	#7: Paris	Mette Jacobsen (Denmark)	2:07.78
Theo Verster (South Africa)	1:57.13	#8: Stockholm	Mette Jacobsen (Denmark)	2:08.59
(United Kingdom) James Hickman (Great Britain)	1:53.20	#9: Berlin	Mette Jacobsen (Denmark)	2:07.92

=== 100 Individual Medley ===
Men		Meet	Women	
Winner (Nationality) WC: Jani Sievinen, FIN	Time 53.10	Meet	Winner (Nationality) WC: Martina Moravcová, SVK	Time 1:00.34
Jirka Letzin (Germany)	55.38	#1: Rio de Janeiro	Yana Klochkova (Ukraine)	1:02.55
(United States) Ron Karnaugh (USA)	56.07	#2: Edmonton	Martina Moravcová (Slovakia)	1:00.97
(United States) Neil Walker (USA)	54.22	#3: New York	Martina Moravcová (Slovakia)	1:01.28
Oleg Lisogor (Ukraine)	55.47	#4: Shanghai	Martina Moravcová (Slovakia)	1:00.97
Geoff Huegill (Australia)	54.98	#5: Melbourne	Brooke Hanson (Australia)	1:02.17
Oleg Lisogor (Ukraine)	54.42	#6: Imperia	Vered Borochovski (Israel)	1:02.25
Bartosz Kizierowski (Poland)	54.57	#7: Paris	Martina Moravcová (Slovakia)	1:00.88
(United States) Ron Karnaugh (USA)	54.77	#8: Stockholm	Martina Moravcová (Slovakia)	1:00.70
Jens Kruppa (Germany)	54.60	#9: Berlin	Martina Moravcová (Slovakia)	1:00.48

=== 200 Individual Medley ===
Men		Meet	Women	
Winner (Nationality) WC: Jani Sievinen, FIN	Time 1:55.44	Meet	Winner (Nationality) WC: Zhan Shu, CHN	Time 2:10.26
Jirka Letzin (Germany)	1:59.03	#1: Rio de Janeiro	Yana Klochkova (Ukraine)	2:13.52
Brian Johns (Canada)	1:59.36	#2: Edmonton	Elizabeth Warden (Canada)	2:14.04
Xavier Marchand (France)	1:59.60	#3: New York	(United States) Amanda Beard (USA)	2:12.14
Jirka Letzin (Germany)	1:59.18	#4: Shanghai	Qi Hui (China)	2:11.52
Justin Norris (Australia)	1:58.16	#5: Melbourne	(United States) Amanda Beard (USA)	2:10.67
Massi Rosolino (Italy)	1:57.99	#6: Imperia	Beatrice Câșlaru (Romania)	2:12.55
Xavier Marchand (France)	1:57.92	#7: Paris	Yana Klochkova (Ukraine)	2:09.10 WC
Theo Verster (South Africa)	1:57.65	#8: Stockholm	Yana Klochkova (Ukraine)	2:09.16
Theo Verster (South Africa)	1:57.49	#9: Berlin	Yana Klochkova (Ukraine)	2:09.24

=== 400 Individual Medley ===
Men		Meet	Women	
Winner (Nationality) WC: Marcel Wouda, NED	Time 4:05.41	Meet	Winner (Nationality) WC: Yana Klochkova, UKR	Time 4:33.66
Jirka Letzin (Germany)	4:15.88	#1: Rio de Janeiro	Yana Klochkova (Ukraine)	4:39.86
Brian Johns (Canada)	4:13.76	#2: Edmonton	Beatrice Câșlaru (Romania)	4:43.72
Tobias Oriwol (Canada)	4:16.64	#3: New York	Yvette Rodier (Australia)	4:45.74
(United Kingdom) James Goddard (Great Britain)	4:16.88	#4: Shanghai	Qi Hui (China)	4:39.97
Justin Norris (Australia)	4:11.15	#5: Melbourne	Jennifer Reilly (Australia)	4:36.38
Lorenzo Sirigu (Italy)	4:13.60	#6: Imperia	Beatrice Câșlaru (Romania)	4:40.30
Jacob Carstensen (Denmark)	4:13.19	#7: Paris	Yana Klochkova (Ukraine)	4:27.83 WR
Terence Parkin (South Africa)	4:10.51	#8: Stockholm	Sara Nordenstam (Sweden)	4:38.99
Terence Parkin (South Africa)	4:10.39	#9: Berlin	Yana Klochkova (Ukraine)	4:31.86
