= 2002–03 FINA Swimming World Cup =

The 2002–03 FINA Swimming World Cup was a series of nine, international short course (25m) swimming meets organized by FINA. The meets were held in seven different cities, from November 2002 through January 2003. Each featured 34 events: 17 for males, 17 for females.

== Meets ==
Dates and locations for the 2002-03 World Cup meets were:

Year	Dates	Location	Results
2 0 0 2
2 0 0 2	November 15–17	Rio de Janeiro, Brazil	
2 0 0 2	November 22+23	(United States) New York, USA	OmegaTiming
2 0 0 2	December 1+2	Shanghai, China	OmegaTiming
2 0 0 2	December 6–8	Melbourne, Australia	OmegaTiming
2 0 0 3
2 0 0 3	January 17+18	Paris, France	
2 0 0 3	January 21+22	Stockholm, Sweden	OmegaTiming
2 0 0 3	January 25+26	Berlin, Germany	OmegaTiming

== Event winners ==
=== 50 freestyle ===
Men		Meet	Women	
Winner (Nationality) WC: Mark Foster, GBR	Time 21.13	Meet	Winner (Nationality) WC: Therese Alshammar, SWE	Time 24.39
(Argentina) José Meolans	21.53	#1: Rio de Janeiro	(Netherlands) Chantal Groot	25.51
(United States) Jason Lezak	21.66	#2: New York	(United Kingdom) Alison Sheppard	24.49
(United States) Jason Lezak	21.40	#3: Shanghai	(United Kingdom) Alison Sheppard	24.44
(Netherlands) Pieter van den Hoogenband	21.72	#4: Melbourne	(Sweden) Therese Alshammar	24.58
(United Kingdom) Mark Foster	21.47	#5: Paris	(United Kingdom) Alison Sheppard	24.23 WC
(United Kingdom) Mark Foster	21.39	#6: Stockholm	(Sweden) Therese Alshammar	24.37
(United Kingdom) Mark Foster	21.28	#7: Berlin	(United Kingdom) Alison Sheppard	24.06 WC

=== 100 freestyle ===
Men		Meet	Women	
Winner (Nationality) WC: Alexander Popov, RUS	Time 46.74	Meet	Winner (Nationality) WC: Jenny Thompson, USA	Time 53.05
(Argentina) José Meolans	47.84	#1: Rio de Janeiro	(Netherlands) Chantal Groot	55.37
(United States) Jason Lezak	47.32	#2: New York	(United States) Jenny Thompson	53.59
(Argentina) José Meolans	48.37	#3: Shanghai	(United Kingdom) Alison Sheppard	54.07
(Netherlands) Pieter van den Hoogenband	47.20	#4: Melbourne	(Australia) Elka Graham	54.42
(Netherlands) Pieter van den Hoogenband	47.41	#5: Paris	(Belarus) Alena Popchanka	53.99
(United States) Jason Lezak	47.41	#6: Stockholm	(Sweden) Therese Alshammar	54.00
(Argentina) José Meolans	47.32	#7: Berlin	(Belarus) Aliaksandra Herasimenia	53.94

=== 200 freestyle ===
Men		Meet	Women	
Winner (Nationality) WC: Ian Thorpe, AUS	Time 1:41.10	Meet	Winner (Nationality) WC: Lindsay Benko, USA	Time 1:55.16
(Netherlands) Pieter van den Hoogenband	1:44.70	#1: Rio de Janeiro	(China) Pang Jiaying	1:59.05
(Netherlands) Pieter van den Hoogenband	1:43.54	#2: New York	(Slovakia) Martina Moravcová	1:57.11
(Czech Republic) Květoslav Svoboda	1:45.61	#3: Shanghai	(China) Yang Yu	1:58.07
(Australia) Grant Hackett	1:42.48	#4: Melbourne	(Australia) Elka Graham	1:55.12 WC
(Australia) Ian Thorpe	1:41.86	#5: Paris	(China) Xu Yanwei	1:55.94
(Canada) Brian Johns	1:46.56	#6: Stockholm	(Sweden) Josefin Lillhage	1:56.18
(Australia) Ian Thorpe	1:41.69	#7: Berlin	(China) Yang Yu	1:54.90 WC

=== 400 freestyle ===
Men		Meet	Women	
Winner (Nationality) WC: Ian Thorpe, AUS	Time 3:35.75	Meet	Winner (Nationality) WC: Lindsay Benko, USA	Time 4:00.30
(Netherlands) Pieter van den Hoogenband	3:43.75	#1: Rio de Janeiro	(United States) Rachel Komisarz	4:07.66
(Netherlands) Pieter van den Hoogenband	3:43.44	#2: New York	(United States) Lindsay Benko	4:06.83
(Czech Republic) Květoslav Svoboda	3:46.22	#3: Shanghai	(China) Yang Yu	4:06.19
(Australia) Grant Hackett	3:36.17	#4: Melbourne	(Australia) Elka Graham	4:01.17
(Romania) Dragoș Coman	3:43.73	#5: Paris	(Romania) Camelia Potec	4:06.87
(Australia) Ian Thorpe	3:34.63 WC	#6: Stockholm	(United States) Lindsay Benko	4:03.13
(Russia) Yuri Prilukov	3:41.87	#7: Berlin	(United States) Lindsay Benko	3:59.53 WR

=== 1500/800 freestyle ===
Men (1500 free)		Meet	Women (800 free)	
Winner (Nationality) WC: Grant Hackett, AUS	Time 14:29.52	Meet	Winner (Nationality) WC: CHEN Hua, CHN	Time 8:15.50
(Brazil) Bruno Bonfim	15:13.50	#1: Rio de Janeiro	(Ukraine) Yana Klochkova	8:33.73
(United Kingdom) Graeme Smith	14:50.00	#2: New York	(Switzerland) Flavia Rigamonti	8:17.28
(China) Zhang Lin	15:00.24	#3: Shanghai	(China) Zheng Jing	8:29.84
(Australia) Stephen Penfold	14:47.49	#4: Melbourne	(United Kingdom) Keri-Anne Payne	8:23.58
(Romania) Dragoș Coman	15:00.46	#5: Paris	(Switzerland) Chantal Strasser	8:29.78
(Romania) Dragoș Coman	14:53.98	#6: Stockholm	(China) Tang Jingzhi	8:29.02
(Russia) Yuri Prilukov	14:38.72	#7: Berlin	(Germany) Hannah Stockbauer	8:19.18

=== 50 backstroke ===
Men		Meet	Women	
Winner (Nationality) WC: Stev Theloke, GER	Time 24.05	Meet	Winner (Nationality) WC: LI Hui, CHN	Time 26.83
(Germany) Toni Helbig	24.91	#1: Rio de Janeiro	(United States) Haley Cope	27.21
(United States) Neil Walker	52.79	#2: New York	(United States) Natalie Coughlin	27.08
(China) Ouyang Kunpeng	24.38	#3: Shanghai	(China) Li Hui	28.01
(Germany) Thomas Rupprath	23.49 WC	#4: Melbourne	(Australia) Giaan Rooney	28.04
(United States) Michael Gilliam	24.37	#5: Paris	(China) Cheng Jiaru	27.89
(Germany) Toni Helbig	24.37	#6: Stockholm	(Japan) Mai Nakamura	27.76
(Germany) Thomas Rupprath	23.53	#7: Berlin	(Japan) Mai Nakamura	27.45

=== 100 backstroke ===
Men		Meet	Women	
Winner (Nationality) WC: Lenny Krayzelburg, USA	Time 51.28	Meet	Winner (Nationality) WC: Natalie Coughlin, USA	Time 57.08
(Germany) Steffen Driesen	53.96	#1: Rio de Janeiro	(United States) Haley Cope	59.93
(United States) Neil Walker	52.79	#2: New York	(United States) Natalie Coughlin	56.71 WC
(China) Ouyang Kunpeng	52.16	#3: Shanghai	(China) Zhang Shu	1:00.19
(Australia) Matt Welsh	51.56	#4: Melbourne	(South Africa) Charlene Wittstock	1:00.32
(China) Ouyang Kunpeng	51.93	#5: Paris	(United Kingdom) Sarah Price	59.39
(Russia) Evgeny Aleshin	52.97	#6: Stockholm	(United Kingdom) Sarah Price	59.02
(Germany) Thomas Rupprath	50.76	#7: Berlin	(United Kingdom) Sarah Price	59.08

=== 200 backstroke ===
Men		Meet	Women	
Winner (Nationality) WC: Gordan Kožulj, CRO	Time 1:51.62	Meet	Winner (Nationality) WC: Natalie Coughlin, USA	Time 2:03.62
(Brazil) Rogério Romero	1:56.52	#1: Rio de Janeiro	(South Africa) Charlene Wittstock	2:08.98
(United States) Michael Phelps	1:54.30	#2: New York	(United States) Natalie Coughlin	2:05.76
(United Kingdom) Steve Parry	1:56.22	#3: Shanghai	(China) Zhang Shong	2:08.46
(United Kingdom) Steve Parry	1:54.31	#4: Melbourne	(United Kingdom) Stephanie Proud	2:08.00
(Netherlands) Klaas-Erik Zwering	1:54.96	#5: Paris	(United Kingdom) Sarah Price	2:05.32
(Russia) Evgeny Aleshin	1:53.60	#6: Stockholm	(United Kingdom) Sarah Price	2:04.67
(Russia) Evgeny Aleshin	1:53.60	#7: Berlin	(United Kingdom) Sarah Price	2:04.67

=== 50 breaststroke ===
Men		Meet	Women	
Winner (Nationality) WC: Oleg Lisogor, UKR	Time 26.20	Meet	Winner (Nationality) WC: Zoë Baker, GBR	Time 30.31
(Brazil) Eduardo Fischer	27.72	#1: Rio de Janeiro	(United States) Brooke Hanson	31.24
(Ukraine) Oleg Lisogor	27.19	#2: New York	(Sweden) Emma Igelström	30.70
(Ukraine) Oleg Lisogor	27.39	#3: Shanghai	(China) Luo Xuejuan	31.03
(Russia) Roman Sludnov	27.48	#4: Melbourne	(Sweden) Emma Igelström	30.58
(Ukraine) Oleg Lisogor	26.52	#5: Paris	(United Kingdom) Zoe Baker	30.66
(Ukraine) Oleg Lisogor	26.68	#6: Stockholm	(Sweden) Emma Igelström	30.51
(Ukraine) Oleg Lisogor	26.68	#7: Berlin	(Sweden) Emma Igelström	30.51

=== 100 breaststroke ===
Men		Meet	Women	
Winner (Nationality) WC: Ed Moses, USA	Time 57.47	Meet	Winner (Nationality) WC: LUO Xuejuan, CHN	Time 1:05.78
(France) Hugues Duboscq	1:00.28	#1: Rio de Janeiro	(United States) Amanda Beard	1:07.10
(Ukraine) Oleg Lisogor	59.30	#2: New York	(Sweden) Emma Igelström	1:06.00
(Ukraine) Oleg Lisogor	59.75	#3: Shanghai	(China) Qi Hui	1:06.14
(United States) David Denniston	59.20	#4: Melbourne	(Sweden) Emma Igelström	1:05.55 WC
(Ukraine) Oleg Lisogor	58.57	#5: Paris	(Austria) Mirna Jukić	1:07.05
(Russia) Roman Sloudnov	57.97	#6: Stockholm	(Sweden) Emma Igelström	1:06.20
(Russia) Roman Sloudnov	57.97	#7: Berlin	(Sweden) Emma Igelström	1:06.20

=== 200 breaststroke ===
Men		Meet	Women	
Winner (Nationality) WC: Ed Moses, USA	Time 2:03.17	Meet	Winner (Nationality) WC: QI Hui, CHN	Time 2:19.25
(France) Hugues Duboscq	2:10.41	#1: Rio de Janeiro	(United States) Amanda Beard	2:23.16
(United States) David Denniston	2:11.84	#2: New York	(United States) Amanda Beard	2:21.42
(Austria) Maxim Podoprigora	2:11.59	#3: Shanghai	(China) Qi Hui	2:18.86 WR
(United States) David Denniston	2:07.53	#4: Melbourne	(Sweden) Emma Igelström	2:19.85
(Japan) Kosuke Kitajima	2:07.48	#5: Paris	(Austria) Mirna Jukić	2:21.58
(Austria) Maxim Podoprigora	2:07.46	#6: Stockholm	(Sweden) Emma Igelström	2:23.91
(Austria) Maxim Podoprigora	2:07.46	#7: Berlin	(Sweden) Emma Igelström	2:23.91

=== 50 butterfly ===
Men		Meet	Women	
Winner (Nationality) WC: Geoff Huegill, AUS	Time 22.74	Meet	Winner (Nationality) WC: Anna-Karin Kammerling, SWE	Time 25.36
(Brazil) Fernando Scherer	23.85	#1: Rio de Janeiro	(China) Zhou Yafei	26.92
(Germany) Thomas Rupprath	23.38	#2: New York	(Sweden) Anna-Karin Kammerling	25.74
(Brazil) Raphael de Thuin	23.93	#3: Shanghai	(Sweden) Anna-Karin Kammerling	26.07
(Germany) Thomas Rupprath	23.21	#4: Melbourne	(Sweden) Therese Alshammar	26.38
(United Kingdom) Mark Foster	23.52	#5: Paris	(Sweden) Therese Alshammar	26.12
(United Kingdom) Mark Foster	23.14	#6: Stockholm	(Sweden) Anna-Karin Kammerling	25.42
(United Kingdom) Mark Foster	23.09	#7: Berlin	(Sweden) Anna-Karin Kammerling	25.51

=== 100 butterfly ===
Men		Meet	Women	
Winner (Nationality) WC: Thomas Rupprath, GER	Time 50.10	Meet	Winner (Nationality) WC: Martina Moravcová, SVK	Time 56.55
(China) Jun Hao	52.57	#1: Rio de Janeiro	(China) Zhou Yafei	59.55
(Germany) Thomas Rupprath	51.17	#2: New York	(United States) Natalie Coughlin	56.34
(United Kingdom) James Hickman	52.20	#3: Shanghai	(Slovakia) Martina Moravcová	57.39
(Germany) Thomas Rupprath	50.82	#4: Melbourne	(United States) Rachel Komisarz	58.67
(Russia) Igor Marchenko	51.56	#5: Paris	(Slovakia) Martina Moravcová	57.37
(Russia) Igor Marchenko	51.17	#6: Stockholm	(Slovakia) Martina Moravcová	57.04
(Russia) Igor Marchenko	51.38	#7: Berlin	(Slovakia) Martina Moravcová	57.32

=== 200 butterfly ===
Men		Meet	Women	
Winner (Nationality) WC: James Hickman, GBR	Time 1:51.76	Meet	Winner (Nationality) WC: Susie O'Neill, AUS	Time 2:04.16
(China) Wu Peng	1:56.65	#1: Rio de Janeiro	(Ukraine) Yana Klochkova	2:09.04
(United Kingdom) James Hickman	1:53.18	#2: New York	(United Kingdom) Georgina Lee	2:09.70
(United Kingdom) James Hickman	1:53.72	#3: Shanghai	(China) Yang Yu	2:08.35
(United Kingdom) Steve Parry	1:53.71	#4: Melbourne	(Australia) Felicity Galvez	2:08.62
(United Kingdom) James Hickman	1:53.03	#5: Paris	(China) Xu Yanwei	2:07.30
(United Kingdom) James Hickman	1:53.66	#6: Stockholm	(China) Yang Yu	2:06.85
(United Kingdom) James Hickman	1:53.33	#7: Berlin	(China) Yang Yu	2:04.90

=== 100 Individual Medley ===
Men		Meet	Women	
Winner (Nationality) WC: Jani Sievinen, FIN	Time 53.10	Meet	Winner (Nationality) WC: Martina Moravcová, SVK	Time 1:00.34
(Poland) Bartosz Kizierowski	55.56	#1: Rio de Janeiro	(United States) Gabrielle Rose	1:01.24
(Ukraine) Oleg Lisogor	54.68	#2: New York	(United States) Natalie Coughlin	58.80 WC
(Ukraine) Oleg Lisogor	54.74	#3: Shanghai	(Slovakia) Martina Moravcová	1:01.10
(Australia) Robert van der Zant	55.45	#4: Melbourne	(Australia) Brooke Hanson	1:01.85
(Ukraine) Oleg Lisogor	53.68	#5: Paris	(Slovakia) Martina Moravcová	1:00.81
(Ukraine) Oleg Lisogor	53.45	#6: Stockholm	(Slovakia) Martina Moravcová	1:00.55
(Germany) Thomas Rupprath	52.58 WR	#7: Berlin	(United States) Gabrielle Rose	1:00.66

=== 200 Individual Medley ===
Men		Meet	Women	
Winner (Nationality) WC: Jani Sievinen, FIN	Time 1:55.44	Meet	Winner (Nationality) WC: Yana Klochkova, UKR	Time 2:09.10
(Hungary) Tamás Kerékjártó	1:57.52	#1: Rio de Janeiro	(Ukraine) Yana Klochkova	2:11.23
(United States) Michael Phelps	1:57.12	#2: New York	(Slovenia) Alenka Kejžar	2:10.83
(United Kingdom) James Hickman	1:58.89	#3: Shanghai	(China) Qi Hui	2:08.77 WC
(Germany) Thomas Rupprath	1:56.41	#4: Melbourne	(China) Zhang Tianyi	2:10.78
(United Kingdom) James Hickman	1:57.32	#5: Paris	(Ukraine) Yana Klochkova	2:08.79
(Australia) Ian Thorpe	1:56.00	#6: Stockholm	(Ukraine) Yana Klochkova	2:09.11
(United Kingdom) James Hickman	1:56.73	#7: Berlin	(Ukraine) Yana Klochkova	2:08.44 WC

=== 400 Individual Medley ===
Men		Meet	Women	
Winner (Nationality) WC: Marcel Wouda, NED	Time 4:05.41	Meet	Winner (Nationality) WC: Yana Klochkova, UKR	Time 4:27.83
(China) Wu Peng	4:12.72	#1: Rio de Janeiro	(Ukraine) Yana Klochkova	4:36.94
(Hungary) Tamás Kerékjártó	4:10.03	#2: New York	(Slovenia) Alenka Kejžar	4:37.18
(China) Li Ziqiang	4:13.26	#3: Shanghai	(Ukraine) Yana Klochkova	4:33.91
(France) Batiste Levaillant	4:12.53	#4: Melbourne	(China) Zhang Tianyi	4:35.69
(New Zealand) Dean Kent	4:11.14	#5: Paris	(Ukraine) Yana Klochkova	4:32.42
(New Zealand) Dean Kent	4:09.00	#6: Stockholm	(Ukraine) Yana Klochkova	4:36.33
(New Zealand) Dean Kent	4:06.66	#7: Berlin	(Ukraine) Yana Klochkova	4:34.80
