= 2000–01 FINA Swimming World Cup =

The 2000–01 FINA Swimming World Cup was a series of ten international short course (25m) swimming meets organized by FINA. The meets were held in ten different cities, from November 2000 through January 2001. Each featured 34 events: seventeen for males and seventeen for females.

== Meets ==
Dates and locations for the 2000–2001 World Cup meets were:

Dates	Location	Results
November 10–12, 2000	Rio de Janeiro, Brazil	
November 15–16, 2000	College Park (Maryland), United States	
November 18–19, 2000	Edmonton, Canada	
December 1–2, 2000	Shanghai, China	Omega Timing
December 5–7, 2000	Melbourne, Australia	Omega Timing
January 13–14, 2001	Imperia, Italy	Omega Timing
January 17–18, 2001	(United Kingdom) Sheffield, Great Britain	
January 20–21, 2001	Berlin, Germany	Omega Timing
January 24–25, 2001	Stockholm, Sweden	
January 27–28, 2001	Paris, France	

== Event winners ==
=== 50 freestyle ===
- Men Winner: N/A
- Women Winner: (Slovakia) Martina Moravcová

Meet	Men Winner	Time	Women Winner	Time
#1: Rio de Janeiro	?	?	?	?
#2: College Park	(Australia) David Jenkins	22.31	(Slovakia) Martina Moravcová	24.81
#3: Edmonton	?	?	?	?
#4: Shanghai	(Russia) Alexander Popov	22.18	(China) Xue Han	25.30
#5: Melbourne	(United States) Jason Lezak	21.99	(Australia) Rebecca Creedy	25.53
#6: Imperia	(United Kingdom) Mark Foster	21.52	(Sweden) Johanna Sjöberg	24.81
#7: Sheffield	?	?	?	?
#8: Berlin	(United Kingdom) Mark Foster	21.24 (CR)	(Sweden) Therese Alshammar	24.63
#9: Stockholm	(United Kingdom) Mark Foster	21.46	(Sweden) Therese Alshammar	24.39 (CR)
#10: Paris	(United Kingdom) Mark Foster	21.13 WR	(Canada) Nadine Rolland	25.51

=== 100 freestyle ===
- Men Winner: (Canada) Brian Jones
- Women Winner: (Slovakia) Martina Moravcová

Meet	Men Winner	Time	Women Winner	Time
#1: Rio de Janeiro	?	?	?	?
#2: College Park	(Australia) David Jenkins	49.37	(Slovakia) Martina Moravcová	53.39
#3: Edmonton	?	?	?	?
#4: Shanghai	(Russia) Alexander Popov	49.11	(Slovakia) Martina Moravcová	54.35
#5: Melbourne	(Australia) Michael Klim	47.98	(Australia) Rebecca Creedy	55.40
#6: Imperia	(United States) Jason Lezak	47.78	(Sweden) Johanna Sjöberg	53.95
#7: Sheffield	?	?	?	?
#8: Berlin	(Australia) Michael Klim	47.53	(Sweden) Therese Alshammar	53.78
#9: Stockholm	(Australia) Michael Klim	47.72	(Sweden) Johanna Sjöberg	54.01
#10: Paris	(Australia) Michael Klim	47.93	(Sweden) Johanna Sjöberg	54.11

=== 200 freestyle ===
- Men Winner: N/A
- Women Winner: (Slovakia) Martina Moravcová

Meet	Men Winner	Time	Women Winner	Time
#1: Rio de Janeiro	?	?	?	?
#2: College Park	(Australia) Leo Biggs	1:47.55	(Slovakia) Martina Moravcová	1:56.14
#3: Edmonton	?	?	?	?
#4: Shanghai	(China) Zha Chen	1:48.68	(Slovakia) Martina Moravcová	1:56.99
#5: Melbourne	(Australia) Grant Hackett	1:44.78	(Australia) Giaan Rooney	1:57.81
#6: Imperia	(Russia) Andrei Kapralov	1:46.48	(Slovakia) Martina Moravcová	1:57.80
#7: Sheffield	?	?	?	?
#8: Berlin	(Russia) Andrei Kapralov	1:45.19	(Australia) Elka Graham	1:59.13
#9: Stockholm	(Australia) Todd Pearson	1:45.23	(Sweden) Marlin Svahnström	1:59.95
#10: Paris	(Australia) Todd Pearson	1:44.94	(France) Solenne Figues	1:57.10

=== 400 freestyle ===
- Men Winner: N/A
- Women Winner: N/A

Meet	Men Winner	Time	Women Winner	Time
#1: Rio de Janeiro	?	?	?	?
#2: College Park	(Spain) Frederik Hviid	3:53.40	(China) Yu Yang	4:08.61
#3: Edmonton	?	?	?	?
#4: Shanghai	(China) Xueliang Song	3:51.76	(China) Chen Hua	4:09.56
#5: Melbourne	(Australia) Grant Hackett	3:42.49	(Australia) Sarah-Jane D'Arcy	4:08.90
#6: Imperia	(Russia) Alexei Filipets	3:46.64	(Australia) Elka Graham	4:08.81
#7: Sheffield	?	?	?	?
#8: Berlin	(Russia) Alexei Filipets	3:44.70	(France) Solenne Figues	4:06.36
#9: Stockholm	(United States) Chad Carvin	3:43.72	(France) Alicia Bozon	4:09.45
#10: Paris	(United States) Chad Carvin	3:43.44	(Costa Rica) Claudia Poll	4:08.23

=== 1500/800 freestyle ===
- Men Winner: N/A
- Women Winner: N/A

Meet	Men Winner	Time	Women Winner	Time
#1: Rio de Janeiro	?	?	?	?
#2: College Park	?	?	?	?
#3: Edmonton	?	?	?	?
#4: Shanghai	?	?	?	?
#5: Melbourne	(France) Oliver Samiadin	15:33.35	(Australia) Sarah-Jane D'Arcy	8:33.66
#6: Imperia	(Italy) Christian Minotti	14:40.17	(Switzerland) Chantal Strasser	8:28.86
#7: Sheffield	?	?	?	?
#8: Berlin	(Russia) Alexei Filipets	14:44.99	?	?
#9: Stockholm	(Belarus) Dmitry Koptour	14:57.29	?	?
#10: Paris	(France) Nicolas Rostoucher	14:46.16	?	?

=== 50 Backstroke ===
- Men Winner: (Germany) Sebastian Halgasch
- Women Winner: (Slovakia) Martina Moravcová

Meet	Men Winner	Time	Women Winner	Time
#1: Rio de Janeiro	?	?	?	?
#2: College Park	(Australia) Beau Mannix	24.62	(United States) Suzy Catterson	28.63
#3: Edmonton	?	?	?	?
#4: Shanghai	(Germany) Sebastian Halgasch	24.76	(China) Shu Zhan	28.14
#5: Melbourne	(Australia) Matt Welsh	24.17	(Australia) Giaan Rooney	28.20
#6: Imperia	(Croatia) Ante Maskovic	24.59	(Slovakia) Martina Moravcová	28.66
#7: Sheffield	?	?	?	?
#8: Berlin	(Lithuania) Darius Grigalionis	24.36	(Germany) Sandra Völker	27.69
#9: Stockholm	(Croatia) Ante Maskovic	24.76	(United States) Barbara Bedford	27.94
#10: Paris	(Croatia) Ante Maskovic	24.66	(United States) Barbara Bedford	27.85

=== 100 Backstroke ===
- Men Winner: (Croatia) Gordan Kozulj
- Women Winner: N/A

Meet	Men Winner	Time	Women Winner	Time
#1: Rio de Janeiro	?	?	?	?
#2: College Park	(Australia) Beau Mannix	53.83	(China) Shu Zhan	1:01.16
#3: Edmonton	?	?	?	?
#4: Shanghai	(China) Kunpen Oyang	53.74	(China) Shu Zhan	1:00.44
#5: Melbourne	(Australia) Matt Welsh	51.89	(Australia) Giaan Rooney	1:00.58
#6: Imperia	(Croatia) Gordan Kozulj	52.91	(Australia) Clementine Stoney	1:01.37
#7: Sheffield	?	?	?	?
#8: Berlin	(Croatia) Gordan Kozulj	52.24	(Germany) Daniela Samulski	1:00.53
#9: Stockholm	(Croatia) Gordan Kozulj	52.68	(United States) Barbara Bedford	59.99
#10: Paris	(Croatia) Gordan Kozulj	52.81	(United States) Barbara Bedford	59.35

=== 200 Backstroke ===
- Men Winner: (Croatia) Gordan Kozulj
- Women Winner: N/A

Meet	Men Winner	Time	Women Winner	Time
#1: Rio de Janeiro	?	?	?	?
#2: College Park	(Germany) Raymond Hass	1:57.66	(United States) Jennifer Mihalik	2:13.84
#3: Edmonton	?	?	?	?
#4: Shanghai	(Croatia) Gordan Kozulj	1:54.88	(China) Jun Huang	2:09.56
#5: Melbourne	(Australia) Matt Welsh	1:54.76	(Australia) Kelly Tucker	2:09.97
#6: Imperia	(Croatia) Gordan Kozulj	1:53.40	(Australia) Clementine Stoney	2:11.44
#7: Sheffield	?	?	?	?
#8: Berlin	(Croatia) Gordan Kozulj	1:51.62 WR	(Australia) Clementine Stoney	2:06.70 (CR)
#9: Stockholm	(Croatia) Gordan Kozulj	1:52.16	(Canada) Kelly Stefanyshyn	2:09.93
#10: Paris	(France) Simon Dufour	1:55.01	(Japan) Reiko Nakamura	2:09.48

=== 50 Breaststroke ===
- Men Winner: (Canada) Morgan Knabe
- Women Winner: (Germany) Sylvia Gerasch

Meet	Men Winner	Time	Women Winner	Time
#1: Rio de Janeiro	?	?	?	?
#2: College Park	(United States) Ed Moses	27.63	(United States) Amy Balcerzak	31.19
#3: Edmonton	?	?	?	?
#4: Shanghai	(Italy) Davide Cassol	28.01	(China) Xuejuan Luo	30.91
#5: Melbourne	(Canada) Morgan Knabe	27.97	(China) Xuejuan Luo	31.11
#6: Imperia	(Italy) Domenico Fioravanti	27.45	(Sweden) Emma Igelström	31.17
#7: Sheffield	?	?	?	?
#8: Berlin	(Russia) Arseni Maliarov	27.39	(Australia) Brooke Hanson	31.11
#9: Stockholm	(Germany) Michael Fischer	27.62	(Germany) Sylvia Gerasch	31.04
#10: Paris	(France) Hugues Duboscq	27.61	(South Africa) Sarah Poewe	31.59

=== 100 Breaststroke ===
- Men Winner: (Canada) Morgan Knabe
- Women Winner: (United States) Amy Balcerzak

Meet	Men Winner	Time	Women Winner	Time
#1: Rio de Janeiro	?	?	?	?
#2: College Park	(United States) Ed Moses	1:00.06	(United States) Amy Balcerzak	1:07.10
#3: Edmonton	?	?	?	?
#4: Shanghai	(Italy) Davide Cassol	1:01.03	(China) Xuejuan Luo	1:06.62
#5: Melbourne	(Canada) Morgan Knabe	1:00.37	(China) Xuejuan Luo	1:06.18 (CR)
#6: Imperia	(Russia) Arseni Maliarov	59.77	(Australia) Brooke Hanson	1:07.17
#7: Sheffield	?	?	?	?
#8: Berlin	(Germany) Michael Fischer	59.46	(United States) Megan Quann	1:07.67
#9: Stockholm	(Canada) Morgan Knabe	59.70	(China) Hui Qi	1:07.00
#10: Paris	(Canada) Morgan Knabe	59.61	(China) Hui Qi	1:06.59

=== 200 Breaststroke ===
- Men Winner: (Italy) Fabio Farabegoli
- Women Winner: (United States) Amy Balcerzak

Meet	Men Winner	Time	Women Winner	Time
#1: Rio de Janeiro	?	?	?	?
#2: College Park	(United States) Ed Moses	2:11.54	(United States) Amy Balcerzak	2:26.27
#3: Edmonton	?	?	?	?
#4: Shanghai	(Italy) Fabio Farabegoli	2:10.78	(China) Hui Qi	2:21.82 (CR)
#5: Melbourne	(Italy) Fabio Farabegoli	2:09.03	(China) Xuejuan Luo	2:23.51
#6: Imperia	(Russia) Dmitri Komornikov	2:08.27	(Sweden) Emma Igelström	2:26.34
#7: Sheffield	?	?	?	?
#8: Berlin	(Russia) Dmitri Komornikov	2:07.74 (CR)	(Japan) Fumiko Watanabe	2:24.82
#9: Stockholm	(Australia) Jim Piper	2:07.69 (CR)	(China) Hui Qi	2:20.28 (CR)
#10: Paris	(Australia) Jim Piper	2:08.37	(China) Hui Qi	2:19.25 WR

=== 50 Butterfly ===
- Men Winner: (Canada) Michael Mintenko
- Women Winner: (Slovakia) Martina Moravcová

Meet	Men Winner	Time	Women Winner	Time
#1: Rio de Janeiro	?	?	?	?
#2: College Park	(Brazil) Raphael Thuim	23.98	(Slovakia) Martina Moravcová	26.60
#3: Edmonton	?	?	?	?
#4: Shanghai	(Canada) Michael Mintenko	24.10	(Slovakia) Martina Moravcová	26.85
#5: Melbourne	(Australia) Michael Klim	23.32	(France) Diane Bui-Duyet	27.65
#6: Imperia	(United Kingdom) Mark Foster	23.43	(Sweden) Johanna Sjöberg	26.50
#7: Sheffield	?	?	?	?
#8: Berlin	(Germany) Thomas Rupprath	23.63	(Sweden) Therese Alshammar	26.06
#9: Stockholm	(Australia) Adam Pine	24.48	(Sweden) Anna-Karin Kammerling	25.36 WR
#10: Paris	(Australia) Michael Klim	23.46	(Sweden) Johanna Sjöberg	26.54

=== 100 Butterfly ===
- Men Winner: (Canada) Michael Mintenko
- Women Winner: (Slovakia) Martina Moravcová

Meet	Men Winner	Time	Women Winner	Time
#1: Rio de Janeiro	?	?	?	?
#2: College Park	(Australia) Shane Fielding	53.30	(Slovakia) Martina Moravcová	58.46
#3: Edmonton	?	?	?	?
#4: Shanghai	(Canada) Michael Mintenko	52.53	(Slovakia) Martina Moravcová	58.63
#5: Melbourne	(Australia) Adam Pine	52.09	(China) Jin Li	1:00.45
#6: Imperia	(Russia) Anatoli Poliakov	52.85	(Sweden) Johanna Sjöberg	58.52
#7: Sheffield	?	?	?	?
#8: Berlin	(Australia) Michael Klim	51.31	(Slovakia) Martina Moravcová	57.16
#9: Stockholm	(Australia) Michael Klim	51.35	(Sweden) Johanna Sjöberg	57.91
#10: Paris	(Australia) Michael Klim	51.08	(Sweden) Johanna Sjöberg	58.61

=== 200 Butterfly ===
- Men Winner: (Russia) Denis Pankratov
- Women Winner: N/A

Meet	Men Winner	Time	Women Winner	Time
#1: Rio de Janeiro	?	?	?	?
#2: College Park	(United States) Michael Phelps	1:55.98	(China) Yi Ruan	2:11.73
#3: Edmonton	?	?	?	?
#4: Shanghai	(China) Hongwei Wang	1:58.65	(China) Tianyi Zhang	2:11.30
#5: Melbourne	(Australia) Greg Shaw	1:56.60	(Australia) Nicole Hunter	2:11.38
#6: Imperia	(Russia) Anatoli Poliakov	1:55.43	(Italy) Paola Cavallino	2:12.91
#7: Sheffield	?	?	?	?
#8: Berlin	(Germany) Thomas Rupprath	1:53.35	(Denmark) Mette Jacobsen	2:07.69
#9: Stockholm	(United States) Tom Malchow	1:52.97	(New Zealand) Elizabeth Van Welie	2:11.38
#10: Paris	(United States) Tom Malchow	1:53.32	(New Zealand) Elizabeth Van Welie	2:10.56

=== 100 Individual Medley ===
- Men Winner: (Germany) Jirka Letzin
- Women Winner: (Slovakia) Martina Moravcová

Meet	Men Winner	Time	Women Winner	Time
#1: Rio de Janeiro	?	?	?	?
#2: College Park	(Germany) Jirka Letzin	55.18	(Slovakia) Martina Moravcová	1:01.10
#3: Edmonton	?	?	?	?
#4: Shanghai	(China) Xiao Zhang	54.97	(Slovakia) Martina Moravcová	1:01.86
#5: Melbourne	(Australia) Robert Van der Zandtl	55.17	(United States) Amy Balcerzak	1:02.09
#6: Imperia	(Italy) Domenico Fioravanti	54.81	(Slovakia) Martina Moravcová	1:01.38
#7: Sheffield	?	?	?	?
#8: Berlin	(Australia) Robert Van der Zandtl	54.32	(Slovakia) Martina Moravcová	1:00.92
#9: Stockholm	(Australia) Robert Van der Zandtl	54.46	(Japan) Tomoko Hagiwara	1:01.82
#10: Paris	(Australia) Robert Van der Zandtl	54.65	(United States) Barbara Bedford	1:01.32

=== 200 Individual Medley ===
- Men Winner: (Germany) Jirka Letzin
- Women Winner: (United States) Amy Balcerzak

Meet	Men Winner	Time	Women Winner	Time
#1: Rio de Janeiro	?	?	?	?
#2: College Park	(Germany) Jirka Letzin	1:58.92	(China) Shu Zhan	2:14.71
#3: Edmonton	?	?	?	?
#4: Shanghai	(Italy) Davide Cassol	1:59.23	(China) Shuang Liang	2:13.32
#5: Melbourne	(Australia) Grant McGregor	1:59.35	(Australia) Lori Munz	2:13.12
#6: Imperia	(Germany) Jirka Letzin	1:58.24	(Australia) Lori Munz	2:12.17
#7: Sheffield	?	?	?	?
#8: Berlin	(Germany) Jirka Letzin	1:58.13	(Australia) Jennifer Reilly	2:11.38
#9: Stockholm	(Germany) Christian Keller	1:57.68	(Canada) Marianne Limpert	2:14.10
#10: Paris	(France) Xavier Marchand	1:59.19	(Japan) Tomoko Hagiwara	2:11.94

=== 400 Individual Medley ===
- Men Winner: (Germany) Jirka Letzin
- Women Winner: N/A

Meet	Men Winner	Time	Women Winner	Time
#1: Rio de Janeiro	?	?	?	?
#2: College Park	?	?	?	?
#3: Edmonton	?	?	?	?
#4: Shanghai	?	?	?	?
#5: Melbourne	(Australia) Grant McGregor	4:10.16	(Australia) Megan McMahon	4:42.87
#6: Imperia	(Russia) Alexei Kovriguine	4:10.54	(Italy) Federica Biscia	4:33.66
#7: Sheffield	?	?	?	?
#8: Berlin	?	?	(Australia) Jennifer Reilly	4:36.38
#9: Stockholm	?	?	(Sweden) Sara Nordenstam	4:44.13
#10: Paris	?	?	(Canada) Kelly Doody	4:47.43
