= Amanda Reason =

Canadian swimmer

Personal information
- Full name: Amanda Reason
- National team: Canada
- Born: August 22, 1993 (age 32) Scarborough, Ontario, Canada
- Height: 1.81 m (5 ft 11 in)
- Weight: 69 kg (152 lb)

Sport
- Sport: Swimming
- Strokes: Breaststroke, Freestyle
- Club: Etobicoke Swim Club
- College team: University of Calgary

Amanda Reason (born August 22, 1993) is a Canadian breaststroke swimmer and a former world-record holder in the 50-metre breaststroke (long course).

== Career ==
On July 8, 2009, Reason burst onto the international scene when she posted a 30.23 world record time for the 50-metre breaststroke. Reason is the first Canadian female to break a world record in a long course pool since Allison Higson accomplished the feat in the 200-metre breaststroke in 1988. At the 2009 World Aquatics Championships, Reason finished seventh in the 50-metre breaststroke. Reason qualified for the 2012 Summer Olympics in London, with her teammate, Brittany MacLean. She also competed for the Canadian women's 4x200-metre freestyle relay team that finished fourth with a time of 7.50.65.

== See also ==
- World record progression 50 metres breaststroke

Records
Preceded by Jade Edmistone	Women's 50-metre breaststroke world record-holder (long course); July 8, 2009 – August 2, 2009	Succeeded by Yuliya Yefimova
