= Teo Edo =

Spanish swimmer

Medal record

Men's swimming

Representing Spain

European Championships (SC)
Bronze medal – third place	1999 Lisbon	1500 m freestyle

Teo Edo Farré (born 2 December 1979 in Barcelona, Catalonia) is a long-distance freestyle swimmer from Spain, who competed for his native country at the 2000 Summer Olympics in Sydney, Australia. There he finished in 24th in the 1500m Freestyle. In the same event he won the bronze medal a year earlier, at the European SC Championships 1999 in Lisbon, Portugal.
