= 1999 European Short Course Swimming Championships =

Water sport competitions

- Host city: Lisbon, Portugal
- Date(s): 9–12 December 1999
- Venue(s): Complexo Desportivo do Jamor

The third edition of the European Short Course Championships was held in Complexo Desportivo do Jamor in Lisbon, Portugal, from 9 to 11 December 1999.

== Medal table ==
* Host nation (Portugal)

Rank	Nation	Gold	Silver	Bronze	Total
1	Sweden (SWE)	9	7	1	17
2	Germany (GER)	6	12	8	26
3	Ukraine (UKR)	5	1	3	9
4	Great Britain (GBR)	3	3	9	15
5	Netherlands (NED)	3	1	2	6
6	Spain (ESP)	2	2	1	5
7	Croatia (CRO)	2	1	0	3
7	Slovakia (SVK)	2	1	0	3
9	Iceland (ISL)	2	0	0	2
10	Denmark (DEN)	1	1	2	4
10	Italy (ITA)	1	1	2	4
12	Belgium (BEL)	1	0	1	2
12	Russia (RUS)	1	0	1	2
14	France (FRA)	1	0	0	1
15	Hungary (HUN)	0	3	0	3
16	Belarus (BLR)	0	1	1	2
16	Portugal (POR)*	0	1	1	2
16	Slovenia (SLO)	0	1	1	2
16	Switzerland (SUI)	0	1	1	2
20	Turkey (TUR)	0	1	0	1
21	Czech Republic (CZE)	0	0	1	1
21	Finland (FIN)	0	0	1	1
21	Israel (ISR)	0	0	1	1
Totals (23 entries)		39	38	37	114

== Medal summary ==
=== Men's events ===
Event	Gold		Silver		Bronze	
50 m freestyle	Mark Foster; Great Britain	21.71	Pieter van den Hoogenband; Netherlands	21.79	Lorenzo Vismara; Italy	21.83
100 m freestyle	Pieter van den Hoogenband; Netherlands	47.20	Lars Frölander; Sweden	47.86	Karel Novy; Switzerland	48.44
200 m freestyle	Pieter van den Hoogenband; Netherlands	1:44.34	Massimiliano Rosolino; Italy	1:45.22	Stefan Herbst; Germany	1:46.09
400 m freestyle	Massimiliano Rosolino; Italy	3:42.00	Jörg Hoffmann; Germany	3:42.88	James Salter; Great Britain	3:43.48
1500 m freestyle	Igor Chervynskyi; Ukraine	14:42.05	Jörg Hoffmann; Germany	14:45.71	Teo Edo; Spain	14:59.43
50 m backstroke	Miro Žeravica; Croatia	24.70	Tomislav Karlo; Croatia	24.72	Sebastian Halgasch; Germany	24.79
100 m backstroke	Örn Arnarson; Iceland	53.13	Derya Büyükuncu; Turkey	53.17	Volodymyr Nikolaychuk; Ukraine	53.27
200 m backstroke	Örn Arnarson; Iceland	1:54.23	Jirka Letzin; Germany	1:55.19	Adam Ruckwood; Great Britain	1:55.25
50 m breaststroke	Mark Warnecke; Germany	27.10	Oleg Lisogor; Ukraine	27.37	Roman Sloudnov; Russia	27.38
100 m breaststroke	Roman Sloudnov; Russia	58.85	Patrik Isaksson; Sweden	59.32	José Couto; Portugal	59.70
200 m breaststroke	Stéphan Perrot; France	2:07.82	José Couto; Portugal	2:09.98	Adam Whitehead; Great Britain	2:10.98
50 m butterfly	Miloš Milošević; Croatia; Lars Frölander; Sweden	23.35	None		Jere Hård; Finland	23.81
100 m butterfly	Lars Frölander; Sweden	51.19	James Hickman; Great Britain	51.43	Denys Sylantyev; Ukraine	52.01
200 m butterfly	James Hickman; Great Britain	1:53.52	Thomas Rupprath; Germany	1:54.43	Denys Sylantyev; Ukraine	1:54.86
100 m individual medley	Jens Kruppa; Germany	53.93	Peter Mankoč; Slovenia	54.27	Marcel Wouda; Netherlands	54.38
200 m individual medley	Marcel Wouda; Netherlands	1:56.46	Jirka Letzin; Germany	1:58.23	Massimiliano Rosolino; Italy	1:58.57
400 m individual medley	Frederik Hviid; Spain	4:08.85	Jirka Letzin; Germany	4:09.85	Michael Halika; Israel	4:12.25
4 × 50 m freestyle relay	Sweden; Claes Andersson; Lars Frölander; Stefan Nystrand; Daniel Carlsson	1:27.12	Germany; Mitja Zastrow; Alexander Lüderitz; Stephan Kunzelmann; Kai Hanschmann	1:27.76	Netherlands; Dennis Rijnbeek; Stefan Aartsen; Marcel Wouda; Pieter van den Hoogenband	1:27.95
4 × 50 m medley relay	Sweden; Daniel Carlsson; Patrik Isaksson; Lars Frölander; Stefan Nystrand	1:36.00	Germany; Sebastian Halgasch; Mark Warnecke; Thomas Rupprath; Alexander Lüderitz	1:36.56	Great Britain; Neil Willey; Darren Mew; James Hickman; Mark Foster	1:36.78

=== Women's events ===
Event	Gold		Silver		Bronze	
50 m freestyle	Therese Alshammar; Sweden	24.09; WR	Anna-Karin Kammerling; Sweden; Sue Rolph; Great Britain	24.90	None	
100 m freestyle	Therese Alshammar; Sweden	52.80; WR	Sue Rolph; Great Britain	53.26	Sandra Völker; Germany	53.34
200 m freestyle	Martina Moravcová; Slovakia	1:56.28	Josefin Lillhage; Sweden	1:57.15	Natalya Baranovskaya; Belarus	1:57.33
400 m freestyle	Yana Klochkova; Ukraine	4:05.12	Natalya Baranovskaya; Belarus	4:06.13	Silvia Szalai; Germany	4:06.48
800 m freestyle	Yana Klochkova; Ukraine	8:22.37	Flavia Rigamonti; Switzerland	8:25.82	Jana Henke; Germany	8:28.89
50 m backstroke	Sandra Völker; Germany	27.31	Nina Zhivanevskaya; Spain	28.24	Antje Buschschulte; Germany	28.35
100 m backstroke	Nina Zhivanevskaya; Spain	59.87	Antje Buschschulte; Germany	1:00.08	Sarah Price; Great Britain	1:00.88
200 m backstroke	Antje Buschschulte; Germany	2.08.11	Nina Zhivanevskaya; Spain	2.09.47	Nicole Hetzer; Germany	2.09.62
50 m breaststroke	Zoë Baker; Great Britain	31.40	Ágnes Kovács; Hungary	31.49	Janne Schäfer; Germany	31.95
100 m breaststroke	Brigitte Becue; Belgium	1:08.15	Ágnes Kovács; Hungary	1:08.30	Emma Igelström; Sweden	1:08.74
200 m breaststroke	Anne Poleska; Germany	2:24.78	Ágnes Kovács; Hungary	2:25.41	Brigitte Becue; Belgium	2:26.82
50 m butterfly	Anna-Karin Kammerling; Sweden	25.64; WR	Johanna Sjöberg; Sweden	26.42	Nicola Jackson; Great Britain	27.17
100 m butterfly	Johanna Sjöberg; Sweden	57.73	Mette Jacobsen; Denmark	59.11	Sophia Skou; Denmark	59.80
200 m butterfly	Mette Jacobsen; Denmark	2:06.87	Johanna Sjöberg; Sweden	2:08.62	Sophia Skou; Denmark	2:09.33
100 m individual medley	Martina Moravcová; Slovakia	1:00.78	Annika Mehlhorn; Germany	1:01.82	Nataša Kejžar; Slovenia	1:02.16
200 m individual medley	Yana Klochkova; Ukraine	2:09.08	Martina Moravcová; Slovakia	2:09.25	Sue Rolph; Great Britain	2:11.29
400 m individual medley	Yana Klochkova; Ukraine	4:34.07	Nicole Hetzer; Germany	4:37.47	Hana Černá; Czech Republic	4:37.74
4 × 50 m freestyle relay	Sweden; Johanna Sjöberg; Therese Alshammar; Anna-Karin Kammerling; Malin Svahnström	1:38.45; WBT	Germany; Katrin Meissner; Simone Osygus; Sandra Völker; Britta Steffen	1:39.21	Great Britain; Alison Sheppard; Nicola Jackson; Karen Pickering; Sue Rolph	1:39.93
4 × 50 m medley relay	Sweden; Therese Alshammar; Emma Igelström; Johanna Sjöberg; Anna-Karin Kammerling	1:49.47; WBT	Germany; Sandra Völker; Janne Schäfer; Marietta Uhle; Katrin Meissner	1:49.87	Great Britain; Katy Sexton; Zoë Baker; Nicola Jackson; Sue Rolph	1:51.64
