= 50 metres breaststroke =

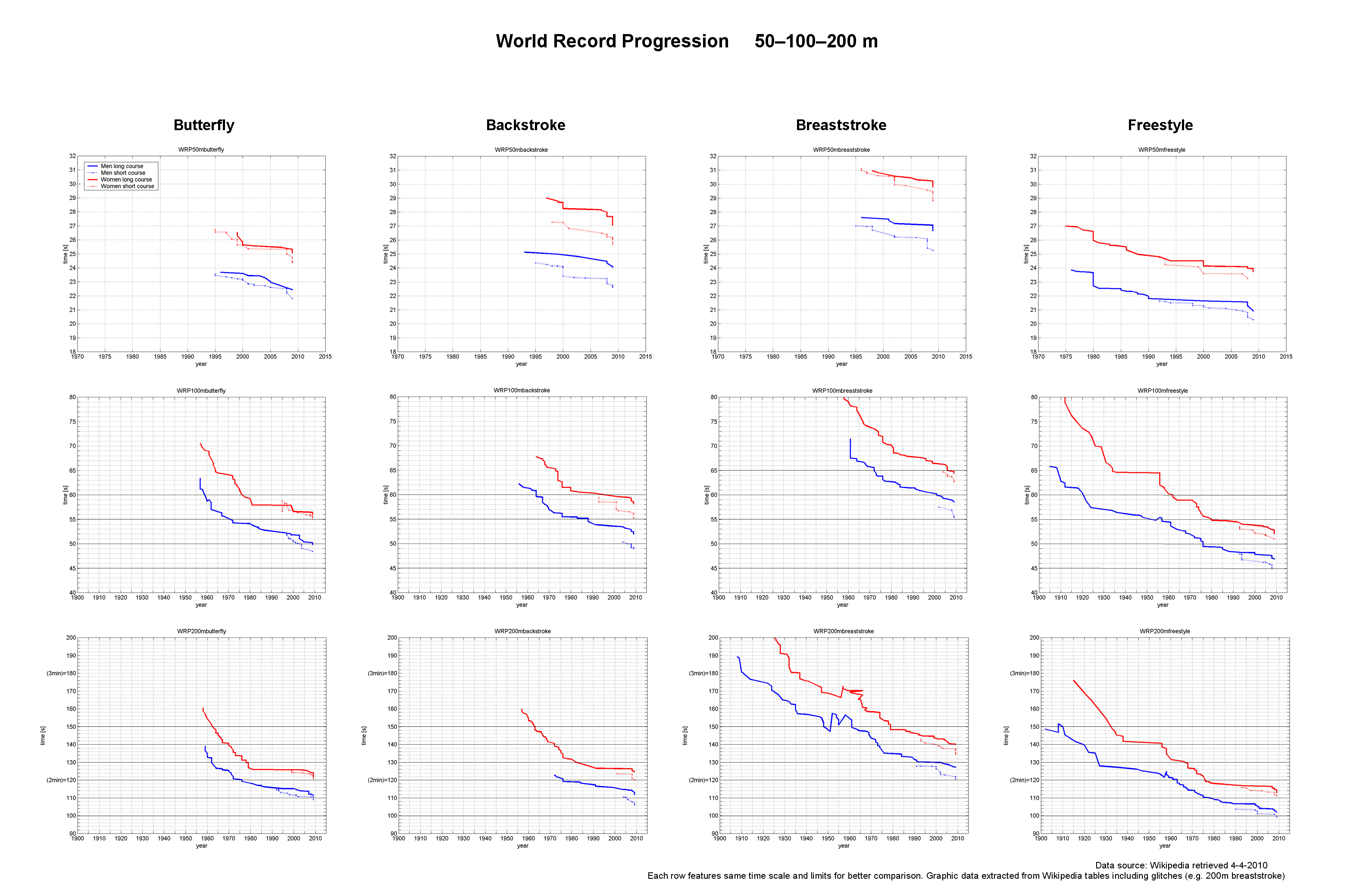
Graphic data for World Record Progression in Men and Women Swimming 50m-100m-200m Long and Short Course Butterfly-Backstroke-Breaststroke-Freestyle

The 50 metres breaststroke is an event in competitive swimming. World records are ratified by World Aquatics (formerly FINA). The current long course world record holders are Great Britain's Adam Peaty and Lithuania's Rūta Meilutytė, while the current short course world record holders are Turkey's Emre Sakçı, and Meilutytė.

The men's and women's events have been contested at the World Aquatics Championships since 2001; the current world champions (long course) are Italy's Simone Cerasuolo, and Meilutytė. The men's and women's events have been contested at the World Aquatics Swimming Championships (25m) since 1999; the current world champions (short course) are China's Qin Haiyang, and Meilutytė.

== World record progression ==
=== Men long course ===
#	Time		Name	Nationality	Date	Meet	Location	Ref
WB	27.61	†	Alexander Dzhaburiya	Ukraine	27 April 1996	Ukraine Olympic Trials	Kharkiv, Ukraine	
1	27.49		Anthony Robinson	United States	29 March 2001	USA Championships	Austin, United States	
2	27.39	tt	Ed Moses	United States	31 March 2001	USA Championships	Austin, United States	
3	27.18		Oleg Lisogor	Ukraine	2 August 2002	European Championships	Berlin, Germany	
4	27.06	sf	Cameron van der Burgh	South Africa	18 April 2009	South African Championships	Durban, South Africa	
5	26.89	h	Felipe França	Brazil	8 May 2009	Brazil Championships	Rio de Janeiro, Brazil	
6	26.74	sf	Cameron van der Burgh	South Africa	28 July 2009	World Championships	Rome, Italy	
7	26.67		Cameron van der Burgh	South Africa	29 July 2009	World Championships	Rome, Italy	
-	26.62	sf, (Note: Unratified due to no epo control)	Adam Peaty	Great Britain	18 August 2014	European Championships	Berlin, Germany	
8	26.62	h	Cameron van der Burgh	South Africa	4 August 2015	World Championships	Kazan, Russia	
9	26.42	sf	Adam Peaty	Great Britain	4 August 2015	World Championships	Kazan, Russia	
10	26.10	h	Adam Peaty	Great Britain	25 July 2017	World Championships	Budapest, Hungary	
11	25.95	sf	Adam Peaty	Great Britain	25 July 2017	World Championships	Budapest, Hungary	

Legend: # – Record awaiting ratification by FINA; e – equalled existing record;
Records not set in finals: h – heat; sf – semifinal; r – relay 1st leg; rh – relay heat 1st leg; b – B final; † – en route to final mark; so – swim-off; tt – time trial

=== Men short course ===
#	Time		Name	Nationality	Date	Meet	Location	Ref
WB	27.29		Dmitri Volkov	Russia	16 March 1991	World Cup	Bonn, Germany	
1	27.00		Mark Warnecke	Germany	18 February 1995	World Cup	Gelsenkirchen, Germany	
2	26.97		Mark Warnecke	Germany	8 February 1997	World Cup	Paris, France	
2	26.97	=	Mark Warnecke	Germany	21 January 1998	World Cup	Sydney, Australia	
2	26.97	=	Mark Warnecke	Germany	28 March 1998	World Cup	Paris, France	
5	26.70		Mark Warnecke	Germany	11 December 1998	European Championships	Sheffield, United Kingdom	
6	26.28		Ed Moses	United States	22 January 2002	World Cup	Stockholm, Sweden	
7	26.20		Oleg Lisogor	Ukraine	26 January 2002	World Cup	Berlin, Germany	
8	26.17		Oleg Lisogor	Ukraine	21 January 2006	World Cup	Berlin, Germany	
9	26.08		Cameron van der Burgh	South Africa	8 November 2008	World Cup	Moscow, Russia	
10	25.94		Cameron van der Burgh	South Africa	11 November 2008	World Cup	Stockholm, Sweden	
11	25.43		Cameron van der Burgh	South Africa	8 August 2009	South African Championships	Pietermaritzburg, South Africa	
12	25.25		Cameron van der Burgh	South Africa	14 November 2009	World Cup	Berlin, Germany	
12	25.25	=	Ilya Shymanovich	Belarus	7 November 2021	European Championships	Kazan, Russia	
14	24.95		Emre Sakçı	Turkey	27 December 2021	Turkish Championships	Gaziantep, Turkey	

Legend: # – Record awaiting ratification by FINA; e – equalled existing record;
Records not set in finals: h – heat; sf – semifinal; r – relay 1st leg; rh – relay heat 1st leg; b – B final; † – en route to final mark; so – swim-off; tt – time trial

=== Women long course ===
#	Time		Name	Nationality	Date	Meet	Location	Ref
WB	30.95	†	Penelope Heyns	South Africa	1 Aug 1998	Goodwill Games	New York, NY, United States	
1	30.83	tt	Penelope Heyns	South Africa	29 Aug 1999	Pan Pacific Championships	Sydney, Australia	
2	30.57	sf	Zoë Baker	Great Britain	30 Jul 2002	Commonwealth Games	Manchester, United Kingdom	
3	30.45		Jade Edmistone	Australia	31 Jul 2005	World Championships	Montreal, Canada	
4	30.31	h	Jade Edmistone	Australia	30 Jan 2006	Australian Championships	Melbourne, Australia	
5	30.23		Amanda Reason	Canada	8 Jul 2009	Canadian Trials	Montreal, Canada	
6	30.09		Yuliya Yefimova	Russia	2 Aug 2009	World Championships	Rome, Italy	
7	29.95	tt	Jessica Hardy	United States	6 Aug 2009	US Open	Federal Way, United States	
8	29.80	†	Jessica Hardy	United States	7 Aug 2009	US Open	Federal Way, United States	
9	29.78	h	Yuliya Yefimova	Russia	3 Aug 2013	World Championships	Barcelona, Spain	
10	29.48	sf	Rūta Meilutytė	Lithuania	3 Aug 2013	World Championships	Barcelona, Spain	
11	29.40		Lilly King	United States	30 Jul 2017	World Championships	Budapest, Hungary	
12	29.30	sf	Benedetta Pilato	Italy	22 May 2021	European Championships	Budapest, Hungary	
12	29.30	sf, =	Rūta Meilutytė	Lithuania	29 July 2023	World Championships	Fukuoka, Japan	
14	29.16		Rūta Meilutytė	Lithuania	30 July 2023	World Championships	Fukuoka, Japan	

Legend: # – Record awaiting ratification by FINA; e – equalled existing record;
Records not set in finals: h – heat; sf – semifinal; r – relay 1st leg; rh – relay heat 1st leg; b – B final; † – en route to final mark; so – swim-off; tt – time trial

=== Women short course ===
#	Time		Name	Nationality	Date	Meet	Location	Ref
1	31.22		Peggy Hartung	Germany	1 February 1992	World Cup	Paris, France	
1	31.11		Han Xue	China	7 January 1996	World Cup	Hong Kong, Hong Kong	
2	30.98		Han Xue	China	11 January 1996	World Cup	Beijing, China	
3	30.88		Han Xue	China	29 January 1997	World Cup	Glasgow, United Kingdom	
4	30.77		Han Xue	China	2 February 1997	World Cup	Gelsenkirchen, Germany	
5	30.60	tt	Penelope Heyns	South Africa	26 September 1999	South African Championships	Durban, South Africa	
6	30.56		Li Wei	China	3 December 2001	World Cup	Shanghai, China	
6	30.56	=	Luo Xuejuan	China	3 December 2001	World Cup	Shanghai, China	
6	30.56	=	Emma Igelström	Sweden	13 December 2001	European Championships	Antwerp, Belgium	
9	30.53		Zoë Baker	Great Britain	4 January 2002	South African Championships	Durban, South Africa	
10	30.51		Zoë Baker	Great Britain	15 January 2002	World Cup	Imperia, Italy	
11	30.47		Luo Xuejuan	China	17 January 2002	World Cup	Paris, France	
12	30.43		Emma Igelström	Sweden	23 January 2002	World Cup	Stockholm, Sweden	
13	30.31		Zoë Baker	Great Britain	27 January 2002	World Cup	Berlin, Germany	
14	30.24		Emma Igelström	Sweden	14 March 2002	Swedish Championships	Gothenburg, Sweden	
15	29.96		Emma Igelström	Sweden	2 April 2002	World Championships	Moscow, Russia	
16	29.90		Jade Edmistone	Australia	26 September 2004	Australian Championships	Brisbane, Australia	
17	29.58		Jessica Hardy	United States	10 April 2008	World Championships	Manchester, United Kingdom	
18	29.45		Jessica Hardy	United States	17 October 2009	World Cup	Durban, South Africa	
19	29.36		Jessica Hardy	United States	7 November 2009	World Cup	Moscow, Russia	
20	28.96	h	Jessica Hardy	United States	11 November 2009	World Cup	Stockholm, Sweden	
21	28.80		Jessica Hardy	United States	14 November 2009	World Cup	Berlin, Germany	
-	28.71	(Note: Rescinded in May 2014 due to doping violation)	Yulia Yefimova	Russia	10 November 2013	World Cup	Tokyo, Japan	
22	28.64		Alia Atkinson	Jamaica	26 October 2016	World Cup	Tokyo, Japan	
23	28.56		Alia Atkinson	Jamaica	6 October 2018	World Cup	Budapest, Hungary	
24	28.37	sf	Rūta Meilutytė	Lithuania	17 December 2022	World Championships	Melbourne, Australia	

Legend: # – Record awaiting ratification by FINA; e – equalled existing record;
Records not set in finals: h – heat; sf – semifinal; r – relay 1st leg; rh – relay heat 1st leg; b – B final; † – en route to final mark; so – swim-off; tt – time trial

== All-time top 25 ==
Tables show data for two definitions of "Top 25" - the top 25 50 m breaststroke times and the top 25 athletes:
- denotes top performance for athletes in the top 25 50 m breaststroke times
- denotes lesser performances, still in the top 25 50 m breaststroke times, by repeat athletes
- denotes top performance (only) for other top 25 athletes who fall outside the top 25 50 m breaststroke times

=== Men long course ===
- Correct as of August 2026

Ath.#	Perf.#	Time	Athlete	Nation	Date	Place	Ref.
1	1	25.95	Adam Peaty	Great Britain	25 July 2017	Budapest	
	2	25.99	Peaty #2		26 July 2017	Budapest	
	3	26.06	Peaty #3		24 July 2019	Gwangju	
	4	26.09	Peaty #4		8 August 2018	Glasgow	
	5	26.10	Peaty #5		25 July 2017	Budapest	
	6	26.11	Peaty #6		23 July 2019	Gwangju	
2	7	26.20	Qin Haiyang	China	25 July 2023	Fukuoka	
2	7	26.20	Simone Cerasuolo	Italy	14 August 2026	Paris	
	9	26.21	Peaty #7		22 May 2021	Budapest	
	10	26.23	Peaty #8		7 August 2018	Glasgow	
	10	26.23	Cerasuolo #2		14 August 2026	Paris	
	12	26.25	Qin #2		29 September 2023	Hangzhou	
	12	26.25	Qin #3		12 December 2023	Jinan	
3	14	26.27	Ludovico Viberti	Italy	27 June 2025	Rome	
	15	26.28	Peaty #9		23 July 2019	Gwangju	
4	15	26.28	Ilya Shymanovich	Belarus	6 April 2023	Brest	
	17	26.29	Qin #4		26 July 2023	Fukuoka	
	17	26.29	Qin #5		7 October 2023	Berlin	
	19	26.30	Qin #6		7 October 2023	Berlin	
	19	26.30	Qin #7		21 October 2023	Budapest	
5	19	26.30	Van Mathias	United States	17 June 2026	Indianapolis	
	22	26.32	Shymanovich #2		20 April 2023	Kazan	
6	22	26.32	Samuel Williamson	Australia	14 February 2024	Doha	
7	24	26.33	Felipe Lima	Brazil	9 June 2019	Monaco	
7	24	26.33	Nicolò Martinenghi	Italy	16 August 2022	Rome	
9		26.38	Michael Houlie	South Africa	24 July 2026	Glasgow	
10		26.42	João Gomes Júnior	Brazil	21 April 2019	Rio de Janeiro	
12		26.45	Nic Fink	United States	21 June 2022	Budapest	
13		26.46	Ivan Kozhakin	Russia	17 April 2025	Kazan	
14		26.52	Michael Andrew	United States	28 April 2022	Greensboro	
15		26.54	Cameron van der Burgh	South Africa	25 July 2017	Budapest	
16		26.57	Melvin Imoudu	Germany	25 April 2026	Berlin	
17		26.61	Sun Jiajun	China	6 May 2023	Hangzhou	
18		26.62	Kirill Prigoda	Russia	30 July 2025	Singapore	
18		26.62	Koen de Groot	Netherlands	15 August 2026	Paris	
20		26.64	Chris Smith	South Africa	11 December 2025	Pretoria	
21		26.65	Taku Taniguchi	Japan	29 July 2025	Singapore	
21		26.65	Watson Nguyen	United States	30 July 2026	Irvine	
23		26.66	Andrey Nikolaev	Russia	29 April 2022	Kazan	
24		26.70	Damir Dugonjič	Slovenia	4 August 2015	Kazan	
24		26.70	Fabio Scozzoli	Italy	23 July 2019	Gwangju	

=== Men short course ===
- Correct as of October 2026

Ath.#	Perf.#	Time	Athlete	Nation	Date	Place	Ref.
1	1	24.95	Emre Sakçı	Turkey	27 December 2021	Gaziantep	
2	2	25.21	Van Mathias	United States	30 October 2026	Westmont	
	3	25.24	Mathias #2		30 October 2026	Westmont	
3	4	25.25	Cameron van der Burgh	South Africa	14 November 2009	Berlin	
3	4	25.25	Ilya Shymanovich	Belarus	7 November 2021	Kazan	
	6	25.29	Sakçı #2		5 November 2020	Budapest	
5	7	25.37	Nicolò Martinenghi	Italy	6 November 2021	Kazan	
	8	25.38	Sakçı #3		6 November 2021	Kazan	
6	8	25.38	Nic Fink	United States	18 December 2022	Melbourne	
6	8	25.38	Qin Haiyang	China	19 October 2024	Shanghai	
	11	25.39	Shymanovich #2		18 December 2020	Brest	
	11	25.39	Sakçı #4		7 November 2021	Kazan	
	13	25.41	van der Burgh #2		16 December 2018	Hangzhou	
8	13	25.41	Adam Peaty	Great Britain	22 November 2020	Budapest	
	13	25.41	Shymanovich #3		18 December 2020	Brest	
	13	25.41	Shymanovich #4		2 September 2021	Naples	
	17	25.42	Martinenghi #2		18 December 2022	Melbourne	
	17	25.42	Qin #2		15 December 2024	Budapest	
	19	25.43	van der Burgh #3		8 August 2009	Pietermaritzburg	
	19	25.43	Sakçı #5		9 November 2020	Budapest	
	19	25.43	Shymanovich #5		6 November 2021	Kazan	
9	19	25.43	Taku Taniguchi	Japan	11 October 2026	Saga	
10	23	25.44	Finlay Brooks	United States	20 November 2026	Sheffield	
11	24	25.45	Roland Schoeman	South Africa	14 November 2009	Berlin	
	25	25.47	Shymanovich #6		25 November 2021	Eindhoven	
	25	25.47	Qin #3		1 November 2024	Singapore	
12		25.48	Kirill Prigoda	Russia	14 December 2024	Budapest	
13		25.51	Vladimir Morozov	Russia	4 December 2019	Glasgow	
14		25.52	Caspar Corbeau	Netherlands	18 October 2025	Westmont	
14		25.52	Simone Cerasuolo	Italy	6 December 2025	Lublin	
16		25.61	Oleg Kostin	Russia	19 December 2024	Saint Petersburg	
17		25.62	Fabio Scozzoli	Italy	13 December 2017	Copenhagen	
17		25.62	Fabio Scozzoli	Italy	13 December 2017	Copenhagen	
18		25.63	Felipe França Silva	Brazil	7 December 2014	Doha	
19		25.66	Chris Smith	South Africa	14 December 2024	Budapest	
20		25.67	Michael Houlie	South Africa	9 October 2026	Tashkent	
21		25.71	Ludovico Viberti	Italy	15 December 2024	Budapest	
22		25.72	Sun Jiajun	China	28 September 2024	Wuhan	
23		25.80	Felipe Lima	Brazil	16 December 2018	Hangzhou	
23		25.80	João Gomes Júnior	Brazil	21 December 2021	Abu Dhabi	
23		25.80	Yan Zibei	China	17 December 2022	Melbourne	

=== Women long course ===
- Correct as of September 2026

Ath.#	Perf.#	Time	Athlete	Nation	Date	Place	Ref.
1	1	29.16	Rūta Meilutytė	Lithuania	30 July 2023	Fukuoka	
2	2	29.30	Benedetta Pilato	Italy	22 May 2021	Budapest	
	2	29.30	Meilutytė #2		29 July 2023	Fukuoka	
	4	29.35	Pilato #2		23 May 2021	Budapest	
3	5	29.40	Lilly King	United States	30 July 2017	Budapest	
	5	29.40	Meilutytė #3		18 February 2024	Doha	
	7	29.42	Meilutytė #4		17 February 2024	Doha	
	8	29.44	Meilutytė #5		16 August 2022	Rome	
4	8	29.44	Tang Qianting	China	19 March 2026	Shenzhen	
	10	29.45	Tang #2		20 September 2026	Tokyo	
	11	29.48	Meilutytė #6		3 August 2013	Barcelona	
	12	29.49	Tang #3		19 March 2026	Shenzhen	
	13	29.50	Pilato #3		22 May 2021	Budapest	
	13	29.50	Tang #4		20 September 2026	Tokyo	
	15	29.51	Tang #5		18 February 2024	Doha	
5	16	29.52	Yulia Yefimova	Russia	4 August 2013	Barcelona	
	17	29.54	Meilutytė #7		2 August 2025	Singapore	
	18	29.55	Meilutytė #8		3 August 2025	Singapore	
	19	29.56	Meilutytė #9		8 October 2023	Berlin	
	20	29.57	Yefimova #2		30 July 2017	Budapest	
	21	29.58	Pilato #4		13 April 2022	Riccione	
	21	29.58	Pilato #5		30 November 2023	Riccione	
	23	29.59	Meilutytė #10		4 August 2013	Barcelona	
	23	29.59	Meilutytė #11		17 August 2022	Rome	
	23	29.59	Pilato #6		9 March 2024	Riccione	
	23	29.59	Tang #6		14 August 2026	Irvine	
6		29.64	McKenzie Siroky	United States	23 May 2026	Monaco	
7		29.71	Molly Hannis	United States	13 January 2018	Austin	
8		29.72	Lara van Niekerk	South Africa	6 April 2022	Gqeberha	
9		29.80	Jessica Hardy	United States	7 August 2009	Federal Way	
9		29.80	Jessica Hardy	United States	4 August 2013	Barcelona	
10		29.81	Lydia Jacoby	United States	29 June 2023	Indianapolis	
11		29.83	Eneli Jefimova	Estonia	21 April 2025	Helsinki	
12		29.86	Arianna Castiglioni	Italy	28 May 2022	Naples	
13		29.90	Skyler Smith	United States	14 August 2026	Irvine	
14		29.91	Satomi Suzuki	Japan	20 September 2026	Tokyo	
15		29.95	Breeja Larson	United States	4 August 2013	Barcelona	
15		29.95	Mona McSharry	Ireland	16 August 2026	Paris	
17		29.99	Katie Meili	United States	30 July 2017	Budapest	
18		30.02	Imogen Clark	Great Britain	30 July 2022	Birmingham	
18		30.02	Anita Bottazzo	Italy	29 July 2023	Fukuoka	
20		30.05	Jennie Johansson	Sweden	9 August 2015	Kazan	
20		30.05	Chelsea Hodges	Australia	30 July 2022	Birmingham	
22		30.09	Tatjana Smith	South Africa	9 April 2024	Gqeberha	
23		30.10	Anna Elendt	Germany	26 May 2022	Barcelona	
24		30.11	Rebecca Soni	United States	2 August 2009	Rome	
24		30.11	Alia Atkinson	Jamaica	9 August 2015	Kazan	
24		30.11	Yang Chang	China	17 November 2025	Shenzhen	

=== Women short course ===
- Correct as of December 2025

Ath.#	Perf.#	Time	Athlete	Nation	Date	Place	Ref.
1	1	28.37	Rūta Meilutytė	Lithuania	17 December 2022	Melbourne	
	2	28.39	Meilutytė #2		14 December 2024	Budapest	
	3	28.50	Meilutytė #3		18 December 2022	Melbourne	
	4	28.54	Meilutytė #4		15 December 2024	Budapest	
2	5	28.56	Alia Atkinson	Jamaica	6 October 2018	Budapest	
	6	28.60	Meilutytė #5		23 October 2022	Berlin	
	7	28.64	Atkinson #2		26 October 2016	Tokyo	
	8	28.70	Meilutytė #6		5 November 2022	Indianapolis	
3	9	28.71	Yulia Yefimova	Russia	10 November 2013	Tokyo	
4	10	28.76	Tang Qianting	China	20 October 2024	Shanghai	
5	11	28.77	Lilly King	United States	21 November 2020	Budapest	
6	12	28.80	Jessica Hardy	United States	14 November 2009	Berlin	
	13	28.81	Meilutytė #7		3 December 2014	Doha	
7	13	28.81	Benedetta Pilato	Italy	21 November 2020	Budapest	
7	13	28.81	Eneli Jefimova	Estonia	7 December 2025	Lublin	
	16	28.82	Tang #2		29 September 2024	Wuhan	
	17	28.84	Meilutytė #8		4 December 2014	Doha	
	17	28.84	Atkinson #3		12 August 2017	Eindhoven	
	19	28.86	King #2		16 October 2020	Budapest	
	19	28.86	Pilato #2		14 November 2020	Budapest	
	19	28.86	King #3		17 December 2022	Melbourne	
	19	28.86	Pilato #3		10 December 2023	Otopeni	
	19	28.86	Tang #3		14 December 2024	Budapest	
	19	28.86	Tang #4		15 December 2024	Budapest	
	25	28.87	Tang #5		2 November 2024	Singapore	
9		29.04	Molly Hannis	United States	16 October 2020	Budapest	
10		29.09	Arianna Castiglioni	Italy	25 September 2021	Naples	
10		29.09	Lara van Niekerk	South Africa	18 December 2022	Melbourne	
12		29.17	Imogen Clark	Great Britain	16 December 2023	Sheffield	
13		29.22	Dominika Sztandera	Poland	14 December 2024	Budapest	
14		29.30	Anna Elendt	Germany	18 December 2022	Melbourne	
15		29.31	Jasmine Nocentini	Italy	9 December 2023	Otopeni	
16		29.33	Ida Hulkko	Finland	5 November 2020	Budapest	
17		29.34	Anastasia Gorbenko	Israel	17 December 2021	Abu Dhabi	
17		29.34	Nika Godun	Russia	17 November 2021	Kazan	
17		29.34	Florine Gaspard	Belgium	7 December 2025	Lublin	
20		29.37	Katie Meili	United States	31 August 2016	Berlin	
21		29.44	Veera Kivirinta	Finland	14 December 2024	Budapest	
22		29.49	Alina Zmushka	Belarus	21 November 2022	Kazan	
23		29.50	Sarah Katsoulis	Australia	22 November 2009	Singapore	
24		29.51	Martina Carraro	Italy	18 October 2020	Budapest	
25		29.53	Sophie Hansson	Sweden	18 November 2023	Sheffield	

== World champions (long course) ==
=== Men ===
Edition	Winner	Time	Notes	Ref.
(Japan) Fukuoka 2001	Oleh Lisohor (UKR)	27.52	CR	
(Spain) Barcelona 2003	James Gibson (GBR)	27.56	(Note: James Gibson set a world record of 27.46 in the semifinals.)	
(Canada) Montreal 2005	Mark Warnecke (GER)	27.63		
(Australia) Melbourne 2007	Oleh Lisohor (UKR)	27.66		
(Italy) Rome 2009	Cameron van der Burgh (RSA)	26.67	WR	
(China) Shanghai 2011	Felipe França Silva (BRA)	27.01		
(Spain) Barcelona 2013	Cameron van der Burgh (RSA)	26.77		
(Russia) Kazan 2015	Adam Peaty (GBR)	26.51	(Note: Adam Peaty set a world record of 26.42 in the semifinals.)	
(Hungary) Budapest 2017	Adam Peaty (GBR)	25.99	(Note: Adam Peaty set a world record of 25.95 in the semifinals.)	
(South Korea) Gwangju 2019	Adam Peaty (GBR)	26.06		
(Hungary) Budapest 2022	Nic Fink (USA)	26.45		
(Japan) Fukuoka 2023	Qin Haiyang (CHN)	26.29		
(Qatar) Doha 2024	Sam Williamson (AUS)	26.32		
Singapore 2025	Simone Cerasuolo (ITA)	26.54		

=== Women ===
Edition	Winner	Time	Notes	Ref.
(Japan) Fukuoka 2001	Luo Xuejuan (CHN)	30.84	CR	
(Spain) Barcelona 2003	Luo Xuejuan (CHN)	30.67	(Note: Luo Xuejuan set a championship record of 30.64 in the semifinals.)	
(Canada) Montreal 2005	Jade Edmistone (AUS)	30.45	WR	
(Australia) Melbourne 2007	Jessica Hardy (USA)	30.63		
(Italy) Rome 2009	Yuliya Yefimova (RUS)	30.09	WR	
(China) Shanghai 2011	Jessica Hardy (USA)	30.19		
(Spain) Barcelona 2013	Yuliya Yefimova (RUS)	29.52	(Note: Rūta Meilutytė set a world record of 29.48 in the semifinals.)	
(Russia) Kazan 2015	Jennie Johansson (SWE)	30.05		
(Hungary) Budapest 2017	Lilly King (USA)	29.40	WR	
(South Korea) Gwangju 2019	Lilly King (USA)	29.84		
(Hungary) Budapest 2022	Rūta Meilutytė (LTU)	29.70		
(Japan) Fukuoka 2023	Rūta Meilutytė (LTU)	29.16	WR	
(Qatar) Doha 2024	Rūta Meilutytė (LTU)	29.40		
Singapore 2025	Rūta Meilutytė (LTU)	29.55		

== World champions (short course) ==
=== Men ===
Edition	Winner	Time	Notes	Ref.
Hong Kong 1999	Dmytri Kraevskyy (UKR)	27.40	(Note: Dmytri Kraevskyy set a championship record of 27.28 in the semifinals.)	
(Greece) Athens 2000	Mark Warnecke (GER)	27.22	(Note: Brendon Dedekind set a championship record of 27.13 in the semifinals.)	
(Russia) Moscow 2002	Oleh Lisohor (UKR)	26.42	CR	
(United States) Indianapolis 2004	Brendan Hansen (USA)	26.86		
(China) Shanghai 2006	Oleh Lisohor (UKR)	26.39	CR	
(United Kingdom) Manchester 2008	Oleh Lisohor (UKR)	26.46		
(United Arab Emirates) Dubai 2010	Felipe França Silva (BRA)	25.95	CR	
(Turkey) Istanbul 2012	Aleksander Hetland (NOR)	26.30		
(Qatar) Doha 2014	Felipe França Silva (BRA)	25.63	CR	
(Canada) Windsor 2016	Cameron van der Burgh (RSA)	25.64		
(China) Hangzhou 2018	Cameron van der Burgh (RSA)	25.41	CR	
(United Arab Emirates) Abu Dhabi 2021	Nic Fink (USA)	25.53		
(Australia) Melbourne 2022	Nic Fink (USA)	25.38	CR	
(Hungary) Budapest 2024	Qin Haiyang (CHN)	25.42		

=== Women ===
Edition	Winner	Time	Notes	Ref.
Hong Kong 1999	Masami Tanaka (JPN)	30.80	=CR	
(Greece) Athens 2000	Sarah Poewe (RSA)	30.66	CR	
(Russia) Moscow 2002	Emma Igelström (SWE)	29.96	WR	
(United States) Indianapolis 2004	Brooke Hanson (AUS)	30.20		
(China) Shanghai 2006	Jade Edmistone (AUS)	30.22		
(United Kingdom) Manchester 2008	Jessica Hardy (USA)	29.58	WR	
(United Arab Emirates) Dubai 2010	Rebecca Soni (USA)	29.83		
(Turkey) Istanbul 2012	Rūta Meilutytė (LTU)	29.44	CR	
(Qatar) Doha 2014	Rūta Meilutytė (LTU)	28.84	(Note: Rūta Meilutytė set a championship record of 28.81 in the semifinals.)	
(Canada) Windsor 2016	Lilly King (USA)	28.92		
(China) Hangzhou 2018	Alia Atkinson (JAM)	29.05		
(United Arab Emirates) Abu Dhabi 2021	Anastasia Gorbenko (ISR)	29.34		
(Australia) Melbourne 2022	Rūta Meilutytė (LTU)	28.50	(Note: Rūta Meilutytė set a world record of 28.37 in the semifinals.)	
(Hungary) Budapest 2024	Rūta Meilutytė (LTU)	28.54		
