= Jade Edmistone =

Australian breaststroke swimmer

Personal information
- Born: 6 February 1982 (age 44) Brisbane, Australia

Sport
- Country: Australia
- Sport: Swimming
- Strokes: Breaststroke
Medal record
World Championships (LC)
Gold medal – first place	2005 Montreal	50 m breaststroke
World Championships (SC)
Gold medal – first place	2004 Indianapolis	4x100 m medley
Gold medal – first place	2006 Shanghai	50 m breaststroke
Gold medal – first place	2006 Shanghai	4x100 m medley
Silver medal – second place	2004 Indianapolis	50 m breaststroke
Silver medal – second place	2004 Indianapolis	100 m breaststroke
Silver medal – second place	2008 Manchester	100 m breaststroke
Bronze medal – third place	2006 Shanghai	100 m breaststroke
Commonwealth Games
Silver medal – second place	2006 Melbourne	50 m breaststroke
Silver medal – second place	2006 Melbourne	100 m breaststroke
Summer Universiade
Silver medal – second place	2003 Daegu	50 m breaststroke

Jade Edmistone (born 6 February 1982) is an Australian breaststroke swimmer, who is the former world-record holder in the 50 m breaststroke at both short and long course formats of the event.

Edmistone was born in Brisbane, Queensland. She was an Australian Institute of Sport scholarship holder.

In 2004, Edmistone emerged as an international calibre swimmer, at the Telstra Australian Short Course Championships. Her three swims in the heats, semifinals and final produced a Commonwealth record, an equalling of the world record and a new world record for the 50 m breaststroke (29.90s).

She followed that with a personal best time to finish second to Olympic silver medallist Brooke Hanson in the 100 m breaststroke final to qualify for her second event at the FINA Short Course World Championships in Indianapolis, Indiana. At the World Championships, Edmistone won the silver medal in the 50 m breaststroke, just 0.01 s behind Hanson. She also took home silver in the 100m breaststroke, also behind Hanson.

Edmistone qualified for her first long course international team in March 2005, when she won the 50 m breaststroke at the 2005 Australian Swimming Championships in Sydney. She had set national records twice on her way to the final. She won her first world title by breaking the world record in the 50 m breaststroke at the 2005 World Aquatics Championships in Montreal, Quebec, Canada in July 2005, setting a time of 30.45 s.

At the 2006 Commonwealth Games Trials in February 2006 in Melbourne, Edmistone set a new personal best in the 100 m breaststroke to become the 2nd fastest Australian of all time, and further lowered her own world record in the 50 metres breaststroke to 30.31s. It was the first world record to be set at the new pool built for the 2006 Commonwealth Games.

She claimed silver in both the 50 m and 100 m breaststroke at the 2006 Commonwealth Games, trailing Leisel Jones in both cases. Then followed up at the 2006 FINA Short Course World Championships in Shanghai with Gold in the 50 m breaststroke, bronze in the 100 m breaststroke and joined Tayliah Zimmer, Jessicah Schipper and Libby Lenton in the 4x100 m medley relay to take gold and set a new world record, beating the previous record by 3 seconds.

Edmistone married fellow Australian swim team member Andrew Richards on 22 April 2006 in a ceremony held at Lyrebird Ridge Organic Winery, a property owned and managed by her aunt and uncle in the beautiful Shoalhaven.

Since retiring from competitive swimming, Edmistone founded 'The ONCORE Academy' which assists with the development of individuals both in and out of the water. It provides products, programs and education specialising in building and strengthening fundamental swimming techniques and developing a strong mental wellbeing outside of sports.

In 2016, Edmistone published her first book, Fish Out Of Water, which delves into her personal experiences as she transitioned from a life as an elite athlete into that of a 'normal' person. The book also has contributions from twelve other former elite female swimmers.

Edmistone is also a motivational speaker, who speaks about her experiences as a professional athlete, the highs and lows during her career and how she navigated through the transition from being a world champion to living a ‘normal’ life. Jade discusses her experiences with mental health and managing the stresses of a high-performance sport.

== Personal bests ==
=== Long course ===
- 50 m Breaststroke: 30.31 s - (Former world record, set in Melbourne, Australia, January 2006)
- 100 m Breaststroke: 1:07.03 s - 2nd fastest Australian all-time.
- 200 m Breaststroke - 2:32.60 s

=== Short course ===
- 50 m Breaststroke - 29.90 s - (Former world record, set in Brisbane, Australia, September 2004)
- 100 m Breaststroke - 1:05.18 s- 2nd Fastest Australian of all-time
- 200 m Breaststroke - 2:25.80 s

== See also ==
- List of Australian records in swimming
- List of Commonwealth Games records in swimming
- World record progression 50 metres breaststroke
- World record progression 4 × 100 metres medley relay

Records
Preceded by Emma Igelström	Women's 50 metre breaststroke world record holder (short course); 26 September 2004 – 10 April 2008	Succeeded by Jessica Hardy
Preceded by Zoë Baker	Women's 50 metre breaststroke world record holder (long course); 31 July 2006 – 8 July 2009	Succeeded by Amanda Reason
