= Michael Raab =

American swimmer (born 1982)

Michael F. Raab
Personal information
- Full name: Michael F. Raab
- Nationality: United States
- Born: December 28, 1982 (age 43) Washington, D.C., U.S.
- Education: University of Virginia (Economics '06); University of Maryland (MBA, 2011)
- Occupations: Financial Analyst; Sands Capital, Arlington, VA

Sport
- Sport: Swimming
- Event: 100, 200 butterfly
- Strokes: Butterfly
- Club: Rockville-Montgomery Swim Club
- College team: University of Virginia
- Coach: Mark Bernardino (UVA)
Medal record
Pan American Games
Gold medal – first place	2003 Santo Domingo	200m Butterfly

Michael F. Raab (born December 28, 1982) is a male butterfly swimmer from the United States, who was an All American competitor for the University of Virginia and won the gold medal in the men's 200m butterfly with a time of 1:57.33 at the 2003 Pan American Games improving on the existing Pan Am record for the event.

Raab was born in greater Washington, DC, to Greg and Linda Raab and grew up in nearby Rockville, Maryland. Both parents were graduates of the University of Virginia, but were not distinguished in athletics. Michael, who began swimming at six at the neighborhood community pool, attended Walter Johnson High School, in nearby Bethesda, Maryland graduating in 2001. For structured training and competition, he swam for the strong program provided by the Rockville-Montgomery Swim Club during his High School years and later during summers when not competing for the University of Virginia. Representing the Rockville-Montgomery Club in May, 1999, at the Speedo Jr. Championships, he placed first in the 200 butterfly with a time of 1:51.06. Raab was not heavily recruited by Universities, nor well-known nationally in the swimming community prior to his collegiate swimming career.

== University of Virginia ==
Raab attended the University of Virginia from around 2001-2006, where he earned first-team All-American honors three times swimming for the Cavaliers under Head Coach Mark Bernardino. Bernardino, who had specialized in butterfly as a swimmer for University of Virginia, used his former experience to greatly improve Raab's technique in the stroke. Bernardino coached at Virginia from 1978-2013, making him Virginia's longest tenured swim coach. A very strong regional swimming team under Bernardino, Virginia won the Atlantic Coast Conference all four years during Raab's tenure with the team.

Raab earned 200-yard butterfly Atlantic Coast Conference Championships four times during his collegiate career. By his Junior year at Virginia, Raab held the best Atlantic Coast Conference times in the 100-meter butterfly with a 48.51 and the 200-meter butterfly with a 1:41.54. His 100-meter time of 48.51 was then the second fastest U.S. National time for collegiate swimming competitors. At the 2003 NCAA Division I National Championsips as a Sophomore, in a very close finish, Raab placed third in his signature stroke, the 200-yard butterfly with a time of 1:42.84. At the 2005 ACC Championships, as a Senior, Raab captured his fourth consecutive first place title in the 200-yard butterfly with a time of 1:44.24, helping lead Viginia to their seventh straight AAC Championship team title under Coach Bernardino.

== International highlights ==
As noted previously, at the 2003 Pan American Games in Santa Domingo, Raab won the 200m butterfly with a time of 1:57.33 taking the gold medal, and setting a new Pan American record for the event. At the final of the FINA 2004 Swimming World Cup on January 30, 2004, in New York, Raab won the gold medal in the 200 Butterfly with a time of 1:56.28

== 2004 Olympic trials ==
At the July, 2004 Olympic swimming trials, Raab placed third in the 200 meter butterfly with a time of 1:57.51, missing a second place finish by only .34 seconds, which would have qualified him for the U.S. team. Michael Phelps and Tom Malchow won the first and second place spots, qualifying for the U.S. team in the event.

Retiring from elite swimming competition around 2005-6, Raab competed in United States Masters Swimming events. He was part of the Potomac Valley Region and has trained with the FINZ Swimming Club. In competition in 2012, competing for the FINZ swim club, he was part of a top-ten age group swim in the 4x50 Medley relay, swimming the butterfly leg, where the team had a combined time of 1:43.14.

== Careers ==
In professional pursuits, Raab graduated the University of Virginia with a BA in Economics around 2006, and later completed an MBA from the Robert H. Smith School of Business at the University of Maryland in 2011. According to Sand Capital as an online source, he worked for SNA Financial in Charlottesville, Virginia from 2006-7, where the University of Virginia is located, and later worked as a Financial Analyst with a Chartered Financial Analyst certification for Sands Capital in Arlington, Virginia as Michael F. Raab, beginning in 2007, where he remained for two decades. At Sands Capital he served as a Research Analyst, Research Director, and a Manager of Portfolios.
