= Chen Yu (synchronized swimmer) =

Chinese synchronized swimmer

Personal information
- Born: February 27, 1981 (age 45)

Sport
- Sport: Synchronised swimming

Chen Yu (Chinese: 陈瑜, born 27 February 1981) is a Chinese synchronized swimmer who competed in the 2004 Summer Olympics.
