= Sebastian Halgasch =

German swimmer

Personal information
- Born: 20 December 1980 (age 45)
Medal record
Men's swimming
Representing Germany
World Championships (SC)
Silver medal – second place	2000 Athens	4x100 m medley
European Championships (SC)
Gold medal – first place	2000 Valencia	4x50 m medley
Silver medal – second place	1999 Lisbon	4x50 m medley
Bronze medal – third place	1999 Lisbon	50 backstroke

Sebastian Halgasch (born 20 December 1980 in Dresden) is a backstroke swimmer from Germany, who won the bronze medal in the 50m Backstroke at the European SC Championships 1999 in Lisbon, Portugal. A couple of months later, at the 2000 FINA Short Course World Championships in Athens, Greece, he captured the silver medal in the 4x100 Medley Relay, alongside Björn Nowakowski, Thomas Rupprath, and Stefan Herbst. In 2001 he won the FINA Swimming World Cup in the 50m Backstroke and 100m Individual Medley.

== See also ==
- German records in swimming
