= Jirka Letzin =

German swimmer (born 1971)

Personal information
- Full name: Jirka Letzin
- Nationality: Germany
- Born: February 8, 1971 (age 55) Neubrandenburg, East Germany
- Height: 1.86 m (6 ft 1 in)
- Weight: 80 kg (176 lb)

Sport
- Sport: Swimming
- Strokes: Backstroke and medley
- Club: Sportgemeinschaft Deutsche Hochschule für Korperkultur, Leipzig
Medal record
Men's swimming
Representing Germany
World Championships (SC)
Bronze medal – third place	1995 Rio de Janeiro	100 m backstroke
European Championships (LC)
Silver medal – second place	1995 Vienna	100 m backstroke
European Championships (SC)
Gold medal – first place	1994 Stavanger	50 m backstroke
Silver medal – second place	1999 Lisbon	200 m backstroke
Silver medal – second place	1999 Lisbon	200 m medley

Jirka Letzin (born February 8, 1971, in Neubrandenburg) is a retired backstroke and medley swimmer from Germany. He won his first major title in 1994, at the European Short Course Championships in Stavanger. He represented his native country at the 2000 Summer Olympics in Sydney, Australia, finishing in 9th place in the men's 400 m individual medley.
