= Steffen Driesen =

German swimmer (born 1981)

Personal information
- Nationality: Germany
- Born: 30 November 1981 (age 44) Düsseldorf, Nordrhein-Westfalen, West Germany
- Height: 1.94 m (6 ft 4 in)
- Weight: 90 kg (198 lb)

Sport
- Sport: Swimming
- Strokes: Backstroke
- Club: SG Bayer Wuppertal
Medal record
Men's swimming
Representing Germany
Olympic Games
Silver medal – second place	2004 Athens	4x100 m medley relay
World Championships (LC)
Silver medal – second place	2001 Fukuoka	4x100 m medley relay
Bronze medal – third place	2001 Fukuoka	100 m backstroke
European Championships (SC)
Silver medal – second place	2003 Dublin	200 m backstroke
Bronze medal – third place	2003 Dublin	100 m backstroke

Steffen Driesen (born 30 November 1981 in Düsseldorf) is a backstroke swimmer from Germany, who competed in two consequentive Summer Olympics for his native country. At the 2004 Summer Olympics in Athens, Greece, he won the silver medal in the 4x100 Medley Relay, alongside Lars Conrad, Jens Kruppa, and Thomas Rupprath.

== See also ==
- German records in swimming
