= Zhang Tianyi (swimmer) =

Chinese swimmer

Personal information
- Born: April 24, 1990 (age 36) Dandong, China

Sport
- Sport: Swimming

Zhang Tianyi (Chinese: 张添翼; pinyin: Zhāng Tiānyì; born 24 April 1990) is a Chinese swimmer who competed in the 2004 Summer Olympics in the 400 m individual medley.
