= Evgeny Aleshin =

Russian swimmer

Yevgeny Alyoshin
Personal information
- Nationality: Russia
- Born: 4 May 1979 (age 47)
- Height: 1.84 m (6 ft 0 in)
- Weight: 81 kg (179 lb)

Sport
- Sport: Swimming
- Strokes: Backstroke
Medal record
Men's swimming
Representing Russia
European Championships (LC)
Gold medal – first place	2002 Berlin	4×100 m medley
European Championships (SC)
Bronze medal – third place	2009 Istanbul	200 m backstroke

Yevgeny Yuryevich Alyoshin (Russian: Евгений Юрьевич Алёшин; born 4 May 1979 Nizhny Novgorod) is a former Russian swimmer who specialized in backstroke. He competed at the 2004 Olympics and the 2007 World Championships.

In November 2010, Aleshin was banned for two years for violation of FINA DC Rule 2.4 (failure to file required whereabouts information and missed tests). He subsequently retired.
