= Zoë Baker =

British swimmer (born 1976)

Personal information
- Nationality: Great Britain (birth to 2004 and 2012 onwards); New Zealand (2005 to 2011)
- Born: 29 February 1976 (age 50)

Sport
- Sport: Swimming
- Strokes: Breaststroke
Medal record
Women's swimming
Representing Great Britain
World Championships (LC)
Bronze medal – third place	2001 Fukuoka	50 m breaststroke
Bronze medal – third place	2003 Barcelona	50 m breaststroke
World Championships (SC)
Bronze medal – third place	2002 Moscow	50 m breaststroke
European Championships (LC)
Silver medal – second place	1999 Istanbul	50 m breaststroke
Silver medal – second place	2000 Helsinki	50 m breaststroke
Bronze medal – third place	1999 Istanbul	4×100 m medley
European Championships (SC)
Gold medal – first place	1999 Lisbon	50 m breaststroke
Bronze medal – third place	1999 Lisbon	4×50 m medley
Representing England
Commonwealth Games
Gold medal – first place	2002 Manchester	50 m breaststroke

Zoë Baker (born 29 February 1976) is a former world record holder in swimming who represented Great Britain until 2005, when she switched allegiance to New Zealand whilst living there. She later returned to the United Kingdom and she switched her allegiance back to Great Britain in 2011.

== Swimming career ==
=== National titles ===
Baker won the ASA National British Championships 50 metres breaststroke title eight times (1992, 1993, 1997, 1999, 2000, 2001, 2002, 2003).

=== 1999 ===
At the 1999 European Aquatics Championships in Istanbul, Baker swam 31.43 seconds in the semifinal of the 50-m breaststroke to set a European record. She collected a silver medal in the final.

=== 2000 ===
Baker earned the silver medal in the 50-m breaststroke at the 2000 European Aquatics Championships in Helsinki, finishing behind Ágnes Kovács of Hungary.

=== 2001 ===
Baker won the bronze medal in the 50-m breaststroke at the 2001 FINA World Championships in Fukuoka, Japan, finishing with a time of 31.40.

=== 2002 ===
Baker represented England at the 2002 Commonwealth Games in Manchester winning the gold medal in the women's 50 m breaststroke in a time of 30.60 seconds. She also set a world record of 30.57 seconds in the semifinal round of the same event, breaking the previous mark set by Penny Heyns of South Africa. In addition, she set a short-course world record with a mark of 30.53 seconds at the South African National Short Championships in Durban, then surpassed that mark later in the same month.

=== 2003 ===
In 2003 Baker collected another medal in the 50-m breaststroke, a bronze at the 2003 FINA World Aquatics Championships in Barcelona behind Chinese swimmer Luo Xuejuan.

=== 2006 ===
At the 2006 Commonwealth Games in Melbourne she was 4th in the same event, this time representing New Zealand.

=== 2012 ===
In January 2012 Baker switched her allegiance back to Great Britain for international swimming competitions.

== Coaching career ==
Baker was the head coach of the Bournemouth Collegiate School Swimming Academy. Baker relocated to Australia in 2022 to take up the head coach role at Peel Aquatic Club, located in Mandurah WA.

== See also ==
- World record progression 50 metres breaststroke

Records
Preceded by (South Africa) Penelope Heyns	Women's 50-metre breaststroke world record holder (long course); 30 July 2002 – 31 July 2005	Succeeded by (Australia) Jade Edmistone
Preceded by (Sweden) Emma Igelström	Women's 50-metre breaststroke world record holder (short course); 4 January 2002 – 17 January 2002	Succeeded by (China) Luo Xuejuan
Preceded by (Sweden) Emma Igelström	Women's 50-metre breaststroke world record holder (short course); 27 January 2002 – 14 March 2002	Succeeded by (Sweden) Emma Igelström
