= Emma Igelström =

Swedish swimmer

Medal record

Women's swimming

Representing Sweden

World Championships (SC)
Gold medal – first place	2000 Athens	4×100 m medley
Gold medal – first place	2002 Moscow	50 m breaststroke
Gold medal – first place	2002 Moscow	100 m breaststroke
Gold medal – first place	2002 Moscow	4×100 m medley
Silver medal – second place	2002 Moscow	200 m breaststroke

European Championships (LC)
Gold medal – first place	2000 Helsinki	4×100 m medley
Gold medal – first place	2002 Berlin	50 m breaststroke
Gold medal – first place	2002 Berlin	100 m breaststroke
Silver medal – second place	2002 Berlin	4×100 m medley
Bronze medal – third place	2002 Berlin	200 m breaststroke

European Championships (SC)
Gold medal – first place	1994 Stavanger	50 m breaststroke
Gold medal – first place	1999 Lisbon	4x50 m medley
Gold medal – first place	2000 Valencia	50 m breaststroke
Gold medal – first place	2000 Valencia	200 m breaststroke
Gold medal – first place	2000 Valencia	4x50 m medley
Gold medal – first place	2001 Antwerp	50 m breaststroke
Gold medal – first place	2001 Antwerp	4x50 m medley
Gold medal – first place	2002 Riesa	50 m breaststroke
Gold medal – first place	2002 Riesa	4x50 m medley
Gold medal – first place	2003 Dublin	4x50 m medley
Silver medal – second place	2000 Valencia	100 m breaststroke
Silver medal – second place	2003 Dublin	50 m breaststroke
Bronze medal – third place	1999 Lisbon	100 m breaststroke
Bronze medal – third place	2001 Antwerp	200 m breaststroke

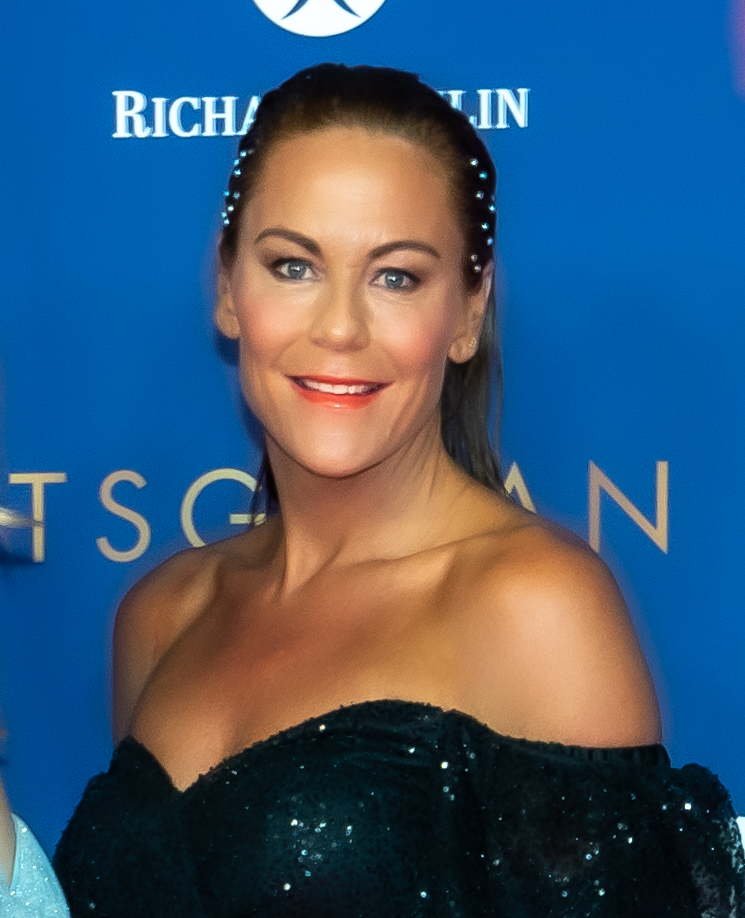
Emma Igelström in 2023

Emma Igelström (born 6 March 1980 in Karlshamn) is a former breaststroke swimmer and European record holder from Sweden. She competed in the 2000 Olympics She quit her career because of bulimia nervosa. Igelström competed as a celebrity dancer in Let's Dance 2014 and was the first to be eliminated.

== Personal bests ==
=== Long course (50 m) ===
Event	Time	Date	Meet	Location	Ref
50 m breaststroke	31.17	1 Aug 2002	European LC Championships	Berlin, Germany	
100 m breaststroke	1:07.27	4 Jul 2002	Swedish Championships	Landskrona, Sweden	
200 m breaststroke	2:27.36	3 Jul 2002	Swedish Championships	Landskrona, Sweden	
200 m individual medley	2:14.79	3 Jul 2002	Swedish Championships	Landskrona, Sweden	

Legend: WR – World record; ER – European record; NR – Swedish record;
Records not set in finals: h – heat; sf – semifinal; r – relay 1st leg; rh – relay heat 1st leg; b – B final; † – en route to final mark; tt – time trial

=== Short course (25 m) ===
Event	Time	Date	Meet	Location	Ref
50 m breaststroke	29.96	4 Apr 2002	World SC Championships	Moscow, Russia	
100 m breaststroke	1:05.11	16 Mar 2003	Swedish SC Championships	Stockholm, Sweden	
200 m breaststroke	2:19.64	16 Mar 2003	Swedish SC Championships	Stockholm, Sweden	
200 m individual medley	2:12.39	21 Nov 2003	Swedish Grand Prix	Gothenburg, Sweden	
400 m individual medley	4:39.73	17 Mar 2002	Swedish SC Championships	Gothenburg, Sweden	

Legend: WR – World record; ER – European record; NR – Swedish record;
Records not set in finals: h – heat; sf – semifinal; r – relay 1st leg; rh – relay heat 1st leg; b – B final; † – en route to final mark; tt – time trial

== Clubs ==
- Karlshamns SK
- Helsingborgs SS
- Spårvägens SF
- Göteborg Sim

Records
Preceded by Li Wei & Luo Xuejuan; Luo Xuejuan; Zoë Baker	World record holder women's 50 breaststroke (25m); 13 December 2001 – 4 January 2002; 23–27 January 2002; 14 March 2002 – 26 September 2004	Succeeded by Zoë Baker; Zoë Baker; Jade Edmistone
