= 1999 Pan Pacific Swimming Championships – Men's 4 × 200 metre freestyle relay =

Men's 4 × 200 metre freestyle relay at the 1999 Pan Pacific Swimming Championships
- Venue: Sydney International Aquatic Centre
- Dates: August 25, 1999 (heats & finals)
- Winning time: 7:08.79

Medalists
gold medal	Ian Thorpe, Bill Kirby, Grant Hackett and Michael Klim	Australia
silver medal	Chad Carvin, Josh Davis, Tom Malchow and Uğur Taner	United States
bronze medal	Mark Johnston, Rick Say, Yannick Lupien and Brian Johns	Canada

The men's 4 × 200 metre freestyle relay competition at the 1999 Pan Pacific Swimming Championships took place on August 25 at the Sydney International Aquatic Centre. The last champion was the United States.

This race consisted of sixteen lengths of the pool. Each of the four swimmers completed four lengths of the pool. The first swimmer had to touch the wall before the second could leave the starting block.

== Records ==
Prior to this competition, the existing world and Pan Pacific records were as follows:

World record	Australia (AUS); Ian Thorpe (1:47.48); Daniel Kowalski (1:47.81); Matthew Dunn (1:49.15); Michael Klim (1:47.42)	7:11.86	Kuala Lumpur, Malaysia	September 13, 1998
Pan Pacific Championships record	United States (USA); Chad Carvin (1:48.26); Tom Malchow (1:50.04); Uğur Taner (1:48.34); Josh Davis (1:47.35)	7:13.99	Fukuoka, Japan	August 11, 1997

== Results ==
All times are in minutes and seconds.

KEY:	q	Fastest non-qualifiers	Q	Qualified	CR	Championships record	NR	National record	PB	Personal best	SB	Seasonal best

=== Heats ===
Heats weren't performed, as only six teams had entered.

=== Final ===
The final was held on August 25.

Rank	Name	Nationality	Time	Notes
1st place, gold medalist(s)	Ian Thorpe (1:46.28); Bill Kirby (1:48.96); Grant Hackett (1:46.30); Michael Klim (1:47.25)	Australia	7:08.79	WR
2nd place, silver medalist(s)	Chad Carvin (1:48.67); Josh Davis (1:47.66); Tom Malchow (1:51.43); Uğur Taner (1:48.90)	United States	7:16.66	
3rd place, bronze medalist(s)	Mark Johnston (1:51.13); Rick Say (1:49.73); Yannick Lupien (1:50.49); Brian Johns (1:51.91)	Canada	7:23.26	
4	Yosuke Ichikawa (1:51.49); Shunsuke Ito (1:50.45); Takeshi Sasaki (1:52.36); Shusuke Ito (1:50.01)	Japan	7:24.31	
5	Nicholas Sheeran (1:54.07); Scott Rice (1:57.85); Brad Herring (1:56.39); John Davis (1:55.27)	New Zealand	7:43.58	
6	- - - -	Chinese Taipei	8:17.08	
