= 1999 Pan Pacific Swimming Championships – Men's 200 metre freestyle =

Men's 200 metre freestyle at the 1999 Pan Pacific Swimming Championships
- Venue: Sydney International Aquatic Centre
- Dates: August 23, 1999 (heats & semifinals); August 24, 1999 (final)
- Competitors: 37 from 8 nations
- Winning time: 1:46.00

Medalists
gold medal	Ian Thorpe	Australia
silver medal	Michael Klim	Australia
bronze medal	Ryk Neethling	South Africa

The men's 200 metre freestyle competition at the 1999 Pan Pacific Swimming Championships took place on August 23–24 at the Sydney International Aquatic Centre. The last champion was Michael Klim of Australia.

This race consisted of four lengths of the pool, all in freestyle.

== Records ==
Prior to this competition, the existing world and Pan Pacific records were as follows:

World record	Grant Hackett (AUS)	1:46.67	Brisbane, Australia	March 23, 1999
Pan Pacific Championships record	Michael Klim (AUS)	1:47.60	Fukuoka, Japan	August 10, 1997

== Results ==
All times are in minutes and seconds.

KEY:	q	Fastest non-qualifiers	Q	Qualified	CR	Championships record	NR	National record	PB	Personal best	SB	Seasonal best

=== Heats ===
The first round was held on August 23.

Rank	Name	Nationality	Time	Notes
1	Ian Thorpe	Australia	1:47.80	Q
2	Michael Klim	Australia	1:48.69	Q
3	Grant Hackett	Australia	1:49.05	Q
4	Chad Carvin	United States	1:49.47	Q
5	Bill Kirby	Australia	1:49.95	Q
6	Josh Davis	United States	1:49.96	Q
7	Ryk Neethling	South Africa	1:49.99	Q
8	Uğur Taner	United States	1:50.11	Q
9	Rick Say	Canada	1:50.20	Q
10	Todd Pearson	Australia	1:50.30	
11	Yosuke Ichikawa	Japan	1:50.74	Q
12	Brian Johns	Canada	1:51.22	Q
13	Shusuke Ito	Japan	1:51.26	Q
14	Shunsuke Ito	Japan	1:51.28	Q
15	Jay Schryver	United States	1:51.69	Q
16	Jon Younghouse	United States	1:51.78	
17	Mike Mintenko	Canada	1:52.15	Q
18	Mark Johnston	Canada	1:52.27	Q
19	Masato Hirano	Japan	1:52.35	
20	Brad Schumacher	United States	1:52.55	
21	Takeshi Sasaki	Japan	1:52.88	
22	Craig Stevens	Australia	1:52.90	
23	Ian Crocker	United States	1:53.04	
24	Graham Duthie	Canada	1:53.14	
25	Nicholas Sheeran	New Zealand	1:53.39	
26	Craig Hutchison	Canada	1:53.47	
27	Ron Karnaugh	United States	1:53.53	
28	Jake Steele	Canada	1:53.97	
29	Kieren Perkins	Australia	1:55.08	
30	Jo Yoshimi	Japan	1:55.68	
31	Brad Herring	New Zealand	1:55.70	
32	Scott Rice	New Zealand	1:55.75	
33	John Davis	New Zealand	1:55.92	
34	Carl Probert	Fiji	1:56.41	
35	Mark Thompson	New Zealand	1:57.95	
36	Steven Ferguson	New Zealand	1:57.96	
37	Lin Hung-Chen	Chinese Taipei	1:58.75	

=== Semifinals ===
The semifinals were held on August 23.

Rank	Name	Nationality	Time	Notes
1	Ian Thorpe	Australia	1:46.34	Q, WR
2	Michael Klim	Australia	1:46.82	Q
3	Grant Hackett	Australia	1:48.20	
4	Chad Carvin	United States	1:48.74	Q
5	Josh Davis	United States	1:48.92	Q
6	Uğur Taner	United States	1:48.94	
7	Ryk Neethling	South Africa	1:49.72	Q
8	Bill Kirby	Australia	1:49.73	
9	Rick Say	Canada	1:50.55	Q
10	Shunsuke Ito	Japan	1:51.10	Q
11	Brian Johns	Canada	1:51.40	Q
12	Mark Johnston	Canada	1:51.41	
13	Yosuke Ichikawa	Japan	1:51.55	
14	Shusuke Ito	Japan	1:51.58	
15	Jay Schryver	United States	1:52.17	
16	Mike Mintenko	Canada	1:53.10	

=== Final ===
The final was held on August 24.

Rank	Lane	Nationality	Time	Notes
1st place, gold medalist(s)	Ian Thorpe	Australia	1:46.00	WR
2nd place, silver medalist(s)	Michael Klim	Australia	1:47.40	
3rd place, bronze medalist(s)	Ryk Neethling	South Africa	1:48.17	
4	Chad Carvin	United States	1:48.60	
5	Josh Davis	United States	1:48.98	
6	Rick Say	Canada	1:50.58	
7	Shunsuke Ito	Japan	1:50.77	
8	Brian Johns	Canada	1:51.09	
