= 1997 Pan Pacific Swimming Championships – Men's 400 metre freestyle =

Men's 400 metre freestyle at the 1997 Pan Pacific Swimming Championships
- Venue: NISHI Civic Pool
- Dates: August 12, 1997 (heats & finals)
- Competitors: 22 from 9 nations
- Winning time: 3:47.27

Medalists
gold medal	Grant Hackett	Australia
silver medal	Ian Thorpe	Australia
bronze medal	Chad Carvin	United States

The men's 400 metre freestyle competition at the 1997 Pan Pacific Swimming Championships took place on August 12 at the NISHI Civic Pool. The last champion was Daniel Kowalski of Australia.

This race consisted of eight lengths of the pool, with all eight being in the freestyle stroke.

== Records ==
Prior to this competition, the existing world and Pan Pacific records were as follows:

World record	Kieren Perkins (AUS)	3:43.80	Rome, Italy	September 11, 1994
Pan Pacific Championships record	Kieren Perkins (AUS)	3:49.43	Kobe, Japan	August 14, 1993

== Results ==
All times are in minutes and seconds.

KEY:	q	Fastest non-qualifiers	Q	Qualified	CR	Championships record	NR	National record	PB	Personal best	SB	Seasonal best

=== Heats ===
The first round was held on August 12.

Rank	Name	Nationality	Time	Notes
1	Grant Hackett	Australia	3:52.42	QA
2	Chad Carvin	United States	3:53.11	QA
3	John Piersma	United States	3:53.74	QA
4	Ian Thorpe	Australia	3:55.10	QA
5	Uğur Taner	United States	3:55.24	QA
6	Mark Johnston	Canada	3:56.59	QA
7	Danyon Loader	New Zealand	3:56.83	QA
8	Jason Samuelson	Australia	3:56.96	QA
9	Tyler Painter	United States	3:57.15	QB
10	Torlarp Sethsothorn	Thailand	3:57.26	QB
11	Ryk Neethling	South Africa	3:57.60	QB
12	Yosuke Ichikawa	Japan	3:57.68	QB
13	Hisato Yasui	Japan	3:57.78	QB
14	Masato Hirano	Japan	3:58.01	QB
15	Tom Malchow	United States	3:58.54	QB
16	Michael McWha	Canada	3:59.03	QB
17	Scott Cameron	New Zealand	4:02.41	
18	Woo Chul	South Korea	4:02.58	
19	Kwok Kin Ming	Hong Kong	4:02.59	
20	Matthew Smith	Australia	4:02.72	
21	Brent Sallee	Canada	4:04.24	
22	Liam Weseloh	Canada	4:06.23	

=== B Final ===
The B final was held on August 12.

Rank	Name	Nationality	Time	Notes
9	Uğur Taner	United States	3:53.59	
10	Jason Samuelson	Australia	3:56.02	
11	Yosuke Ichikawa	Japan	3:56.55	
12	Michael McWha	Canada	3:56.96	
13	Scott Cameron	New Zealand	3:59.59	
14	Masato Hirano	Japan	3:59.72	
15	Hisato Yasui	Japan	4:00.52	
15	Woo Chul	South Korea	4:00.52	

=== A Final ===
The A final was held on August 12.

Rank	Lane	Nationality	Time	Notes
1st place, gold medalist(s)	Grant Hackett	Australia	3:47.27	CR
2nd place, silver medalist(s)	Ian Thorpe	Australia	3:49.64	
3rd place, bronze medalist(s)	Chad Carvin	United States	3:50.40	
4	John Piersma	United States	3:51.81	
5	Danyon Loader	New Zealand	3:54.10	
6	Ryk Neethling	South Africa	3:54.58	
7	Mark Johnston	Canada	3:55.37	
8	Torlarp Sethsothorn	Thailand	3:55.84	
