= 1997 Pan Pacific Swimming Championships – Men's 4 × 200 metre freestyle relay =

Men's 4 × 200 metre freestyle relay at the 1997 Pan Pacific Swimming Championships
- Venue: NISHI Civic Pool
- Dates: August 11, 1997 (heats & finals)
- Winning time: 7:13.99

Medalists
gold medal	Chad Carvin, Tom Malchow, Uğur Taner and Josh Davis	United States
silver medal	Michael Klim, Ian Thorpe, Ian van der Wal and Grant Hackett	Australia
bronze medal	Trent Bray, Scott Cameron, Nicholas Tongue and Danyon Loader	New Zealand

The men's 4 × 100 metre freestyle relay competition at the 1997 Pan Pacific Swimming Championships took place on August 11 at the NISHI Civic Pool. The last champion was Australia.

This race consisted of sixteen lengths of the pool. Each of the four swimmers completed four lengths of the pool. The first swimmer had to touch the wall before the second could leave the starting block.

== Records ==
Prior to this competition, the existing world and Pan Pacific records were as follows:

World record	Soviet Union (URS); Dmitry Lepikov (1:49.55); Vladimir Pyshnenko (1:46.58); Veniamin Tayanovich (1:48.99); Yevgeny Sadovyi (1:46.83)	7:11.95	Barcelona, Spain	July 27, 1992
Pan Pacific Championships record	Australia (AUS); Malcolm Allen (1:50.13); Glen Housman (1:48.57); Matthew Dunn (1:48.74); Daniel Kowalski (1:50.08)	7:17.52	Atlanta, United States	August 11, 1995

== Results ==
All times are in minutes and seconds.

KEY:	q	Fastest non-qualifiers	Q	Qualified	CR	Championships record	NR	National record	PB	Personal best	SB	Seasonal best

=== Heats ===
Heats weren't performed, as only seven teams had entered.

=== Final ===
The final was held on August 11.

Rank	Name	Nationality	Time	Notes
1st place, gold medalist(s)	Chad Carvin (1:48.26); Tom Malchow (1:50.04); Uğur Taner (1:48.34); Josh Davis (1:47.35)	United States	7:13.99	CR
2nd place, silver medalist(s)	Michael Klim (1:47.56); Ian Thorpe (1:50.86); Ian van der Wal (1:49.35); Grant Hackett (1:47.95)	Australia	7:15.72	
3rd place, bronze medalist(s)	Trent Bray (1:50.24); Scott Cameron (1:52.72); Nicholas Tongue (1:53.99); Danyon Loader (1:51.38)	New Zealand	7:28.33	
4	Shunsuke Ito (1:52.25); Yukihiro Matsushita (1:54.25); Masato Hirano (1:52.46); Yosuke Ichikawa (1:50.17)	Japan	7:29.13	
5	Mark Johnston (1:52.15); Stephen Clarke (1:52.60); Edward Parenti (1:52.97); Curtis Myden (1:51.97)	Canada	7:29.69	
6	- - - -	Hong Kong	7:51.32	
7	- - - -	Uzbekistan	7:53.31	
