= 2002 Pan Pacific Swimming Championships – Men's 400 metre freestyle =

Men's 400 metre freestyle at the 2002 Pan Pacific Swimming Championships
- Venue: Yokohama International Swimming Pool
- Dates: August 24, 2002 (heats & finals)
- Competitors: 23 from 9 nations
- Winning time: 3:45.28

Medalists
gold medal	Ian Thorpe	Australia
silver medal	Grant Hackett	Australia
bronze medal	Klete Keller	United States

The men's 400 metre freestyle competition at the 2002 Pan Pacific Swimming Championships took place on August 24 at the Yokohama International Swimming Pool. The last champion was Ian Thorpe of Australia.

This race consisted of eight lengths of the pool, with all eight being in the freestyle stroke.

== Records ==
Prior to this competition, the existing world and Pan Pacific records were as follows:

World record	Ian Thorpe (AUS)	3:40.08	Manchester, Great Britain	July 30, 2002
Pan Pacific Championships record	Ian Thorpe (AUS)	3:41.83	Sydney, Australia	August 22, 1999

== Results ==
All times are in minutes and seconds.

KEY:	q	Fastest non-qualifiers	Q	Qualified	CR	Championships record	NR	National record	PB	Personal best	SB	Seasonal best

=== Heats ===
The first round was held on August 24.

Rank	Heat	Lane	Name	Nationality	Time	Notes
1	3	4	Ian Thorpe	Australia	3:46.94	Q
2	2	4	Grant Hackett	Australia	3:48.50	Q
3	3	5	Craig Stevens	Australia	3:48.75	Q
4	1	4	Klete Keller	United States	3:49.19	Q
5	2	5	Erik Vendt	United States	3:49.58	Q
6	1	5	Chad Carvin	United States	3:49.99	Q
7	3	3	Shunichi Fujita	Japan	3:51.57	Q
8	2	3	Larsen Jensen	United States	3:52.41	Q
9	3	6	Richard Say	Canada	3:53.76	
10	2	6	Mark Johnston	Canada	3:53.96	
11	3	2	Naoya Sonoda	Japan	3:54.24	
12	3	7	Bruno Bonfim	Brazil	3:57.22	
13	1	3	Takeshi Matsuda	Japan	3:57.96	
14	1	6	Yosuke Ichikawa	Japan	3:59.09	
15	1	2	Kurtis MacGillivary	Canada	3:59.50	
16	1	7	Moss Burmester	New Zealand	4:03.31	
17	2	1	Cameron Gibson	New Zealand	4:03.69	
18	2	7	Juan Pablo Valdivieso	Peru	4:04.31	
19	2	2	Mark Kin Ming Kwok	Hong Kong	4:04.86	
20	1	1	Kwok Leung Chung	Hong Kong	4:11.37	
21	3	1	Rafael Mosca	Brazil	4:11.44	
22	2	8	Seung Gin Lee	Northern Mariana Islands	4:26.65	
23	3	8	Dean Palacios	Northern Mariana Islands	4:28.74	

=== Final ===
The final was held on August 24.

Rank	Lane	Name	Nationality	Time	Notes
1st place, gold medalist(s)	4	Ian Thorpe	Australia	3:45.28	
2nd place, silver medalist(s)	5	Grant Hackett	Australia	3:45.99	
3rd place, bronze medalist(s)	3	Klete Keller	United States	3:48.40	
4	6	Erik Vendt	United States	3:49.75	
5	2	Shunichi Fujita	Japan	3:51.40	
6	7	Mark Johnston	Canada	3:52.29	
7	1	Naoya Sonoda	Japan	3:55.98	
8	8	Bruno Bonfim	Brazil	4:00.20	
