= 1999 Pan Pacific Swimming Championships – Men's 400 metre freestyle =

Men's 400 metre freestyle at the 1999 Pan Pacific Swimming Championships
- Venue: Sydney International Aquatic Centre
- Dates: August 22, 1999 (heats & final)
- Competitors: 20 from 7 nations
- Winning time: 3:41.83

Medalists
gold medal	Ian Thorpe	Australia
silver medal	Grant Hackett	Australia
bronze medal	Ryk Neethling	South Africa

The men's 400 metre freestyle competition at the 1999 Pan Pacific Swimming Championships took place on August 22, 1999 at the Sydney International Aquatic Centre. The last champion was Grant Hackett of Australia.

This race consisted of eight lengths of the pool, with all eight being in the freestyle stroke.

== Records ==
Prior to this competition, the existing world and Pan Pacific records were as follows:

World record	Kieren Perkins (AUS)	3:43.80	Rome, Italy	September 11, 1994
Pan Pacific Championships record	Grant Hackett (AUS)	3:47.27	Fukuoka, Japan	August 12, 1997

== Results ==
All times are in minutes and seconds.

KEY:	q	Fastest non-qualifiers	Q	Qualified	CR	Championships record	NR	National record	PB	Personal best	SB	Seasonal best

=== Heats ===
The first round was held on August 22.

Rank	Name	Nationality	Time	Notes
1	Grant Hackett	Australia	3:47.37	Q
2	Ian Thorpe	Australia	3:48.36	Q
3	Ryk Neethling	South Africa	3:49.47	Q
4	Masato Hirano	Japan	3:52.33	Q
5	Chad Carvin	United States	3:52.41	Q
6	Jon Younghouse	United States	3:52.63	Q
6	Chris Thompson	United States	3:52.63	
8	Craig Stevens	Australia	3:53.97	
9	Erik Vendt	United States	3:55.00	
10	Yosuke Ichikawa	Japan	3:55.79	Q
11	Rick Say	Canada	3:56.07	Q
12	Mark Johnston	Canada	3:56.10	
13	Shusuke Ito	Japan	3:59.14	
14	Kieren Perkins	Australia	3:59.27	
15	Chuck Sayao	Canada	4:01.06	
16	Tim Peterson	Canada	4:02.95	
17	Andrew Hurd	Canada	4:05.08	
18	Torin Hay	New Zealand	4:08.77	
19	Hsu Kuo-tung	Chinese Taipei	4:17.68	
20	Lin Shu-Jen	Chinese Taipei	4:28.57	

=== Final ===
The final was held on August 22.

Rank	Lane	Nationality	Time	Notes
1st place, gold medalist(s)	Ian Thorpe	Australia	3:41.83	WR
2nd place, silver medalist(s)	Grant Hackett	Australia	3:46.02	
3rd place, bronze medalist(s)	Ryk Neethling	South Africa	3:46.31	
4	Chad Carvin	United States	3:49.74	
5	Masato Hirano	Japan	3:52.32	
6	Rick Say	Canada	3:53.20	
7	Jon Younghouse	United States	3:53.28	
8	Yosuke Ichikawa	Japan	3:58.98	
