= Swimming at the 2001 World Aquatics Championships – Men's 400 metre freestyle =

Men's 400 metre freestyle at the 2001 FINA World Championships
- Dates: 22 July 2001
- Competitors: 37
- Winning time: 3:40.17 WR

Medalists
gold medal	Ian Thorpe	Australia
silver medal	Grant Hackett	Australia
bronze medal	Emiliano Brembilla	Italy

The men's 400 metre freestyle event at the 2001 World Aquatics Championships took place 22 July. Both the heats and final were held on 22 July.

In the final, Australian swimmer Ian Thorpe broke his own world record with a time of 3:40.17, bettering his previous record of 3:40.59 and successfully defending his world title. At the 200 metre mark in this race, Thorpe was over a second outside world record pace but had a split of 53.78 in the last 100 metres to break the record. This was the first of six gold medals he would win, and the first of four world records he would set at these championships.

== Records ==
Prior to the competition, the existing world and championship records were as follows:

World record	Ian Thorpe (AUS)	3:40.59	Sydney, Australia	16 September 2000
Championship record	Kieren Perkins (AUS)	3:43.80	Rome, Italy	9 September 1994

The following record was established during the competition:

Date	Round	Name	Nationality	Time	Record
22 July	Final	Ian Thorpe	Australia	3:40.17	WR

== Results ==
=== Preliminaries ===
Rank	Swimmer	Nation	Time	Notes
1	Grant Hackett	Australia	3:44.88	Q
2	Ian Thorpe	Australia	3:45.22	Q
3	Emiliano Brembilla	Italy	3:46.45	Q
4	Massimiliano Rosolino	Italy	3:47.92	Q
5	Chad Carvin	United States	3:49.93	Q
6	Shunichi Fujita	Japan	3:50.36	Q
7	Spyridon Gianniotis	Greece	3:50.98	Q
8	Dragoș Coman	Romania	3:50.99	Q
9	Athanasios Oikonomou	Greece	3:51.64	
10	Jacob Carstensen	Denmark	3:52.23	
11	Rick Say	Canada	3:52.55	
12	James Salter	Great Britain	3:52.72	
13	Alexey Filipets	Russia	3:52.88	
14	Heiko Hell	Germany	3:54.06	
15	Edward Sinclair	Great Britain	3:54.52	
16	Robert Margalis	United States	3:54.65	
17	Han Kyu-Chul	South Korea	3:54.82	
18	Nicolas Rostoucher	France	3:55.24	
19	Masato Hirano	Japan	3:55.91	
20	Andrew Hurd	Canada	3:56.45	
21	Květoslav Svoboda	Czech Republic	3:56.59	
22	Ricardo Monasterio	Venezuela	3:56.96	
23	Leonardo Salinas	Mexico	4:00.47	
24	Stepan Ganzey	Russia	4:01.01	
25	Jorge Carral	Mexico	4:01.10	
26	Shilo Ayalon	Israel	4:02.06	
27	Giancarlo Zolezzi	Chile	4:03.19	
28	Jiang Bing-Ru	Chinese Taipei	4:07.55	
29	Mohammad Naeem Masri	Syria	4:19.60	
30	Hsu Kuo-Tung	Chinese Taipei	4:21.87	
31	Barnsley Albert	Seychelles	4:25.09	
32	Mumtaz Ahmad	Pakistan	4:32.10	
33	Semen Danilov	Kyrgyzstan	4:35.17	
34	Kin Duenas	Guam	4:38.72	
35	Dean Palacios	Northern Mariana Islands	4:38.99	
36	Mark Unpingco	Guam	4:41.92	
37	Zaid Saeed	Iraq	4:50.64	
–	Thamer Al Shamroukh	Kuwait	DNS	

=== Final ===
Rank	Name	Nationality	Time	Notes
1st place, gold medalist(s)	Ian Thorpe	Australia	3:40.17	WR
2nd place, silver medalist(s)	Grant Hackett	Australia	3:42.51	
3rd place, bronze medalist(s)	Emiliano Brembilla	Italy	3:45.11	
4	Massimiliano Rosolino	Italy	3:45.41	
5	Chad Carvin	United States	3:50.11	
6	Dragoș Coman	Romania	3:50.13	
7	Spyridon Gianniotis	Greece	3:52.09	
8	Shunichi Fujita	Japan	3:52.11	

Key: WR = World record
