= Theismann =

Theismann is a German surname. Notable people with the surname include the following:

- Dirk Theismann (born 1963), German former water polo player
- Joe Theismann (born 1949), American former football player

== See also ==
- Manfred Thiesmann, a former German Olympic swimming coach
