= Masato Hirano =

Masato Hirano may refer to:

- Masato Hirano (swimmer) (born 1975), Japanese swimmer
- Masato Hirano (voice actor) (born 1955), Japanese voice actor
