= Gregor Jordan =

Australian film director

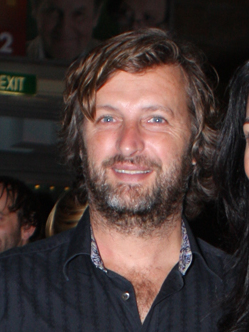
- Jordan in 2012
- Born: 1966 (age 59–60); Sale, Victoria, Australia
- Occupations: Film director, screenwriter, actor
- Spouse: Simone Kessell
- Children: 2

Gregor Jordan (born 1966) is an Australian film director, writer and actor.

Jordan's films include Two Hands (1999), Buffalo Soldiers (2001), and Ned Kelly (2003). Two Hands won the Australian Film Institute Award for Best Direction and Best Screenplay in 1999. He has most recently directed The Informers, an American film adapted from short stories written by Bret Easton Ellis and Nicholas Jarecki and the thriller Unthinkable starring Samuel L. Jackson.

He directed the concert video These Days: Live in Concert (2004) by Australian rock band Powderfinger. He has also produced a live concert DVD of Powderfinger's final concert tour 'Sunsets' (2010), as well as a documentary about Ian Thorpe's failed return to professional swimming ahead of the 2012 Summer Olympic Games in London.

Jordan is married to New Zealand actress Simone Kessell. They have two sons, Jack, who was born in January 2005 in Los Angeles and Beau, born in 2013.

Prior to making films Gregor Jordan played Bassanio in The Merchant of Venice for Shakespeare By The Sea (Australia).

== Filmography ==
- Two Hands (1999), also writer
- Buffalo Soldiers (2001), also co-writer
- Ned Kelly (2003)
- These Days: Live in Concert (2004)
- The Informers (2008)
- Sunsets: Powderfinger's Farewell Tour (2010)
- Unthinkable (2010)
- Ian Thorpe: The Swimmer (2012 documentary)
- Dirt Music (2019)
