= Tracey Menzies =

Australian swimming coach

Tracey Menzies is an Australian swimming coach, most known for coaching five-time Olympic champion Ian Thorpe, Australia's most successful Olympian, from late 2002 until his retirement in 2006.

She was an assistant of Doug Frost, Thorpe's former coach at Sutherland SLC, before Thorpe parted ways with him. After that, she became head of Sutherland when Frost departed, also coaching the likes of Craig Stevens, Ky Hurst and Kirsten Thomson. She was part of Australia's coaching delegation to the 2004 Summer Olympics.

She originally started as a learn-to-swim coach, teaching toddlers and younger children how to swim.

She was an art and physical education teacher at East Hills Boys Technology High School, coincidentally the same school Thorpe attended.

She is currently a senior swimming coach at the Swimming Australia National Training Centre at the Australian Institute of Sport.

In 2022, Tracey commenced a role with the Y NSW as head squad coach at Gungahlin Leisure Centre in the ACT.
