= Ian Thorpe and drug testing =

Ian Thorpe, an Australian freestyle swimmer and five-time Olympic gold medalist, was targeted in the 2000s for criticism alleging his athletic achievements have been fueled by the use of performance-enhancing drugs, and steroid drug doping. Despite numerous tests no proof of these allegations has ever materialized. Thorpe has steadfastly denied the allegations, and he has been a prominent critic of the drug policies used by the World Anti-Doping Agency and International Swimming Federation (FINA), the governing body of world swimming as being too lax, and poorly conducted.

== 2000 German allegations ==
In 2000, Thorpe embarked on a European FINA World Cup tour in order to hone his racecraft prior to the 2000 Summer Olympics, but faced accusations from German head coach Manfred Thiesmann. Thiesmann implied that Thorpe was using steroids, stating "We all know Lamberti was pumped up and his times stood for ages, but Thorpe is not only passing them – he's passing them by seconds." The Australian delegation pointed to Thorpe's clean record, while Swimming World editor-in-chief Phillip Whitten stated his belief that Thorpe was clean: "There is absolutely no reason to suspect Ian Thorpe is doping. Detailed underwater stroke analysis shows he has extraordinary technique. In addition, he exhibits none of the physical signs of drug use. His physical attributes, natural talent, excellent coaching and superior technique account entirely for his superb performances."

At the subsequent German leg of the tour in Berlin, Thorpe and American backstroke World Champion Lenny Krayzelburg were drug tested. Unable to locate the required containers, the testing officials asked the swimmers for permission to have their samples left unsealed in a fridge overnight against the security protocol for drug testing, permission that was refused by the Australian and US officials. After a standoff, a compromise was struck: German police officers were called in to take temporary responsibility for the samples. Thorpe proceeded to cut more than 1.5 s from his world short course record in the 200 m freestyle, receiving a standing ovation from a German crowd that disagreed with Thiesmann's comments. Thorpe rates this as his best-ever performance, ahead of his victories at Olympic and World level.

Accusations of drug use continued later in the year, this time from German captain Chris-Carol Bremer, who stated that Thorpe's "hands and feet are unusually big" due to the use of human growth hormone. Thorpe denied the claims and called for the introduction of blood testing, promising to have a sample frozen to prove his innocence upon the discovery of such a test. Although a test for EPO was developed in time for the games, no positive test for hGh was found.

== 2007 L'Equipe allegations ==
In March 2007, L'Équipe, a French daily sports newspaper, reported on its website that Thorpe showed "abnormal levels" of two banned substances in a doping test in May 2006.

The Australian Sports Anti-Doping Authority (ASADA) later confirmed that Thorpe was investigated for abnormal levels of testosterone and luteinizing hormone (LH); both naturally occurring in the body. Thorpe's elevated LH level was what caused ASADA to initially investigate, and dismiss, the test result. Thorpe denied the rumours in a press conference on 31 March 2007 stating, "I firmly believe I am clean, I have never cheated and have always fulfilled my obligations."

In April 2007, the World Anti-Doping Agency (WADA) issued a statement condemning the breach of privacy that L'Equipe's announcement constituted. In 2021, FINA announced an independent investigation into the decade-old leak, with the new FINA president (Husain Al Musallam) saying that "it was not too late to reopen the case and ensure that justice was served."

== Anti-drugs campaign ==
Thorpe is prominent in the campaign against drug use, inside and outside sports. He has called for the introduction of blood testing, and criticised FINA for allegedly inadequate drug-testing procedures, claiming that "for anyone to think that they're swimming at a clean Olympic Games, they'd be naive". Although swimmers and coaches praised him, he was condemned by FINA, who accused him of bringing the sport into disrepute. Thorpe was selected by the United Nations to lead an anti-recreational drugs campaign in Japan, as well as promotional work for UNICEF for UN Children's Week.
