= Swimming at the 2003 World Aquatics Championships – Men's 400 metre freestyle =

Men's 400m Freestyle at the 2003 FINA World Aquatics Championships
- Dates: 20 July 2003
- Winning time: 3 minute 42.58 seconds

Medalists
gold medal	Ian Thorpe	Australia
silver medal	Grant Hackett	Australia
bronze medal	Dragos Coman	Romania

The Men's 400 Freestyle event at the 10th FINA World Aquatics Championships swam on 20 July 2003 in Barcelona, Spain.

Prior to the start of the event, the existing World (WR) and Championship (CR) records were:

- WR: 3:40.08 swum by Ian Thorpe (Australia) on 30 July 2002 in Manchester, UK
- CR: 3:40.17 swum by Ian Thorpe (Australia) on 22 July 2001 in Fukuoka, Japan

== Results ==
=== Final ===
Place	Swimmer	Nation	Time	Notes
1	Ian Thorpe	Australia	3:42.58	
2	Grant Hackett	Australia	3:45.11	
3	Dragoș Coman	Romania	3:46.87	
4	Massimiliano Rosolino	Italy	3:47.44	
5	Klete Keller	United States	3:47.70	
6	Yuri Prilukov	Russia	3:48.50	
7	Chad Carvin	United States	3:50.36	
8	Graeme Smith	United Kingdom	3:51.83	

=== Preliminaries ===
Rank	Heat	Lane	Swimmer	Nation	Time	Notes
1	8	4	Ian Thorpe	Australia	3:47.44	Q
2	7	4	Grant Hackett	Australia	3:48.35	Q
3	8	3	Yuri Prilukov	Russia	3:48.49	Q
4	7	5	Massimiliano Rosolino	Italy	3:49.59	Q
5	8	5	Klete Keller	United States	3:49.85	Q
6	7	3	Graeme Smith	United Kingdom	3:49.92	Q
7	6	3	Chad Carvin	United States	3:50.28	Q
8	6	5	Dragoș Coman	Romania	3:50.29	Q
9	6	7	Oussama Mellouli	Tunisia	3:52.04	
10	8	8	Sergiy Fesenko	Ukraine	3:52.24	
11	7	7	Nikolaos Xylouris	Greece	3:52.34	
12	8	2	Nicolas Rostoucher	France	3:52.53	
13	6	1	Alexey Filipets	Russia	3:52.93	
14	6	2	Mark Johnston	Canada	3:53.06	
14	8	6	Rick Say	Canada	3:53.06	
16	6	4	Emiliano Brembilla	Italy	3:53.43	
17	7	6	Athanasios Oikonomou	Greece	3:54.17	
18	8	1	Przemysław Stańczyk	Poland	3:54.68	
19	7	2	David Davies	United Kingdom	3:54.70	
20	7	8	Dzmitry Koptur	Belarus	3:54.87	
21	4	8	Bojan Zdešar	Slovenia	3:55.07	
22	6	6	Shunichi Fujita	Japan	3:55.13	
23	5	1	Lin Zhang	China	3:55.41	
24	8	7	Ihor Chervynskyi	Ukraine	3:55.81	
25	6	8	Shai Livnat	Israel	3:56.33	
26	5	3	Shilo Ayalon	Israel	3:57.79	
27	5	8	Gian Carlo Zolezzi	Chile	3:57.92	
28	5	6	Luis Monteiro	Portugal	3:58.57	
29	5	5	Felipe Araujo	Brazil	3:58.74	
30	5	2	Bruno Bonfim	Brazil	3:59.57	
31	7	1	Cheng Yu	China	3:59.93	
32	5	4	Erwin Maldonado	Venezuela	4:00.47	
33	4	5	Victor Rogut	Moldova	4:01.46	
34	3	4	Cameron Gibson	New Zealand	4:02.87	
35	4	4	Raouf Benabid	Algeria	4:02.99	
36	4	3	Juan Pablo Valdivieso	Peru	4:03.83	
37	3	6	Anovar Bennaceur	Tunisia	4:04.32	
38	3	5	Dean Kent	New Zealand	4:04.60	
39	3	1	Igor Erhartic	Yugoslavia	4:05.38	
40	3	7	Yi-Khy Saw	Malaysia	4:05.87	
41	5	7	Gerry Strasser	Switzerland	4:06.94	
42	4	1	Emanuele Nicolini	San Marino	4:08.35	
43	3	2	Kwok Leung Chung	Hong Kong	4:08.49	
44	2	4	Timur Irgashev	Uzbekistan	4:09.83	
45	2	3	Jonathan Mauri	Costa Rica	4:11.13	
46	3	3	Mohammad Naeem Masri	Syria	4:11.49	
47	4	7	Petr Vasilev	Uzbekistan	4:11.54	
48	3	8	Carlos Castro	Chile	4:11.68	
49	2	6	Youssef Hafdi	Morocco	4:12.70	
50	2	2	Rehan Poncha	India	4:14.22	
51	4	6	Ronald Cowen	Bermuda	4:14.39	
52	2	1	Rony Bakale	Republic of the Congo	4:23.67	
53	1	6	Seung Gin Lee	Northern Mariana Islands	4:25.25	
54	1	5	Neil Agius	Malta	4:25.44	
55	1	4	Anas Samir Abo Yousif	Qatar	4:26.27	
56	1	3	Mumtaz Ahmed	Pakistan	4:30.26	
57	2	5	Vasilii Danilov	Kyrgyzstan	4:30.52	
58	1	2	Steven Mangroo	Seychelles	4:31.41	
58	2	7	Sergey Dyachkov	Azerbaijan	4:31.41	
60	2	8	Barnsley Albert	Seychelles	4:31.51	
–	–	-	Mihail Alexandrov	Bulgaria	DNS	
–	–	-	Trevor Kakunze	Burundi	DNS	
