= Undercover Angel =

Undercover Angel may refer to:

- Undercover Angel (film), a 1999 Canadian film
- "Undercover Angel" (song), a 1977 song by Alan O'Day

== See also ==
- Undercover Angels, a 2002 Australian television series
- Undercover Angels (album), an album by Grand Buffet
