= Ian Thorpe: The Swimmer =

- Directed by: Gregor Jordan
- Country of origin: Australia
- Original language: English

Production
- Producers: Gregor Jordan; Simone Kessell; Helen Panckhurst
- Editor: Roland Gallois
- Running time: 52 minutes
- Production company: Matchbox Pictures

Original release
- Release: 2012

Ian Thorpe: The Swimmer is a 2012 documentary covering the lead up to the 2012 Summer Olympics, where Ian Thorpe undertook a failed attempt to comeback. The documentary is directed by Gregor Jordan and was produced for the ABC by Finch in association with Matchbox Pictures.

Ian Thorpe failed to make the 2012 Australian team, but began his transition to being a television personality.
