= Swimming Australia National Training Centre =

Swimming Australia National Training Centre SAL NTC
- Sport: Swimming

History
- Year of formation: 1981
- Former names: AIS Swimming Program

Demographics
- Membership size: Approximately 15 Athletes

Staff
- Address: Australian Institute of Sport; Bruce, Australian Capital Territory
- Chief Executive: Mark Anderson
- Olympic team manager: Petria Thomas
- Olympic Coach: Tracey Menzies
- Paralympic Coach: Yuriy Vdovychenko

Finance
- Sponsors: Hancock Prospecting

Swimming Australia National Training Centre ("NTC") (formally the AIS Swimming Program) is an Olympic and Paralympic swimming scholarship program based at the Australian Institute of Sport. Set up as one of the eight founding program of the AIS in 1981 It is supported by the Australian Sports Commission under the Winning Edge 2012-2022 strategy and identified by Swimming Australia as a Podium Performance Centre.

The programs administration and swimming coaching services is run by Swimming Australia. The sports medicine, sports science and strength and conditioning services are provided by the AIS.

== History ==
The National Training Centre programme replaces the AIS Swimming scholarship programme that ran from the AIS's formation in 1981. As well as the AIS Paralympic Program that ran between 2009 and 2011.

The Swimming Australia NTC scholarship program is funded by the Australian Federal Government, through the Australian Sports Commission. The program provides both residential and off-site living arrangement depending on the choice of the athlete. The program provides funding to those athletes who choose to live off-site.

The NTC program was set up as part of the Australian Sports Commission Winning Edge 2012-2022 strategy and officially replaced the AIS Swimming Program on January 1, 2014.

Current coaching staff include Tracey Menzies and Yuriy Vdovychenko. The program is managed by former AIS Swimming Scholarship holder Petria Thomas.

== See also ==
- Australian Institute of Sport swimmers
- Australian Institute of Sport Paralympic swimmers
