= Ian Thorpe Aquatic Centre =

Australian fitness centre

Coordinates: 33.87742°S 151.19875°E

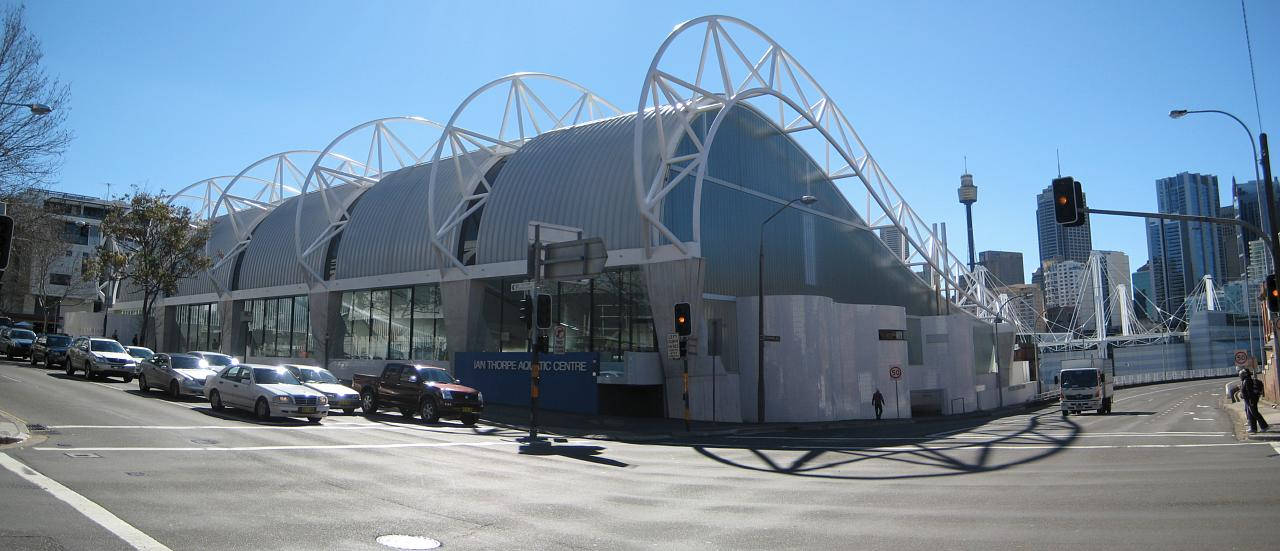
The Ian Thorpe Aquatic Centre in 2009

Ian Thorpe Aquatic and Fitness Centre is a fitness centre in Ultimo, New South Wales, a suburb of Sydney, Australia. It has three swimming pools, exercise machines, and other facilities. The centre is co-managed by the City of Sydney and Belgravia Leisure. Named for swimming champion Ian Thorpe, it was one of the last buildings designed by architect Harry Seidler, and is noted for its curved roof design that suggests a breaking ocean wave.

== Construction history ==
In 2000, the city announced a design competition for the project, then called the Ultimo Aquatic Centre and Public Space. After receiving about 100 entries, the open competition was scrapped, and a new competition was held among three invited firms. In late 2001, a jury chose Harry Seidler's firm to continue with the project.

Construction was delayed due to budgetary and other concerns until 2004, when new Lord Mayor Clover Moore and the city council, responding to an energetic campaign of local residents, reversed their prior position and decided to go ahead with the full plan (then budgeted at $40 million) that had been initiated under former Lord Mayor Frank Sartor, rather than a curtailed $25 million plan that had been adopted under the intervening administration of Lucy Turnbull. The project was renamed in honor of Australia's Olympic swimming champion Ian Thorpe.

Seidler died in 2006. The project was completed under the supervision of his widow, Penelope Seidler, and opened in August 2007.

== Critical reception ==
Since its completion, the building has been described as an important example of Seidler's architecture. Philip Drew wrote that it was a "climax" of his work, "meshing the severely functional and the playfully sensuous." Architecture critic Elizabeth Farrelly, who had been critical of Seidler's design when it was selected, was more positive about the final result: she noted some awkwardness in the design, including its undefined entry and narrow changing spaces, but praised its "experiential qualities". In 2013, Farrelly included it on her list of the "five best buildings in Sydney", stating that while she found the external wave metaphor "slightly silly", the interior is "a breathtakingly beautiful room". The building received an International Architecture Award in 2009.

== See also ==
- Cook and Phillip Park Aquatic and Fitness Centre
- Andrew "Boy" Charlton Pool
