= Ian Thorpe =

Australian swimmer (born 1982)

Ian Thorpe AM
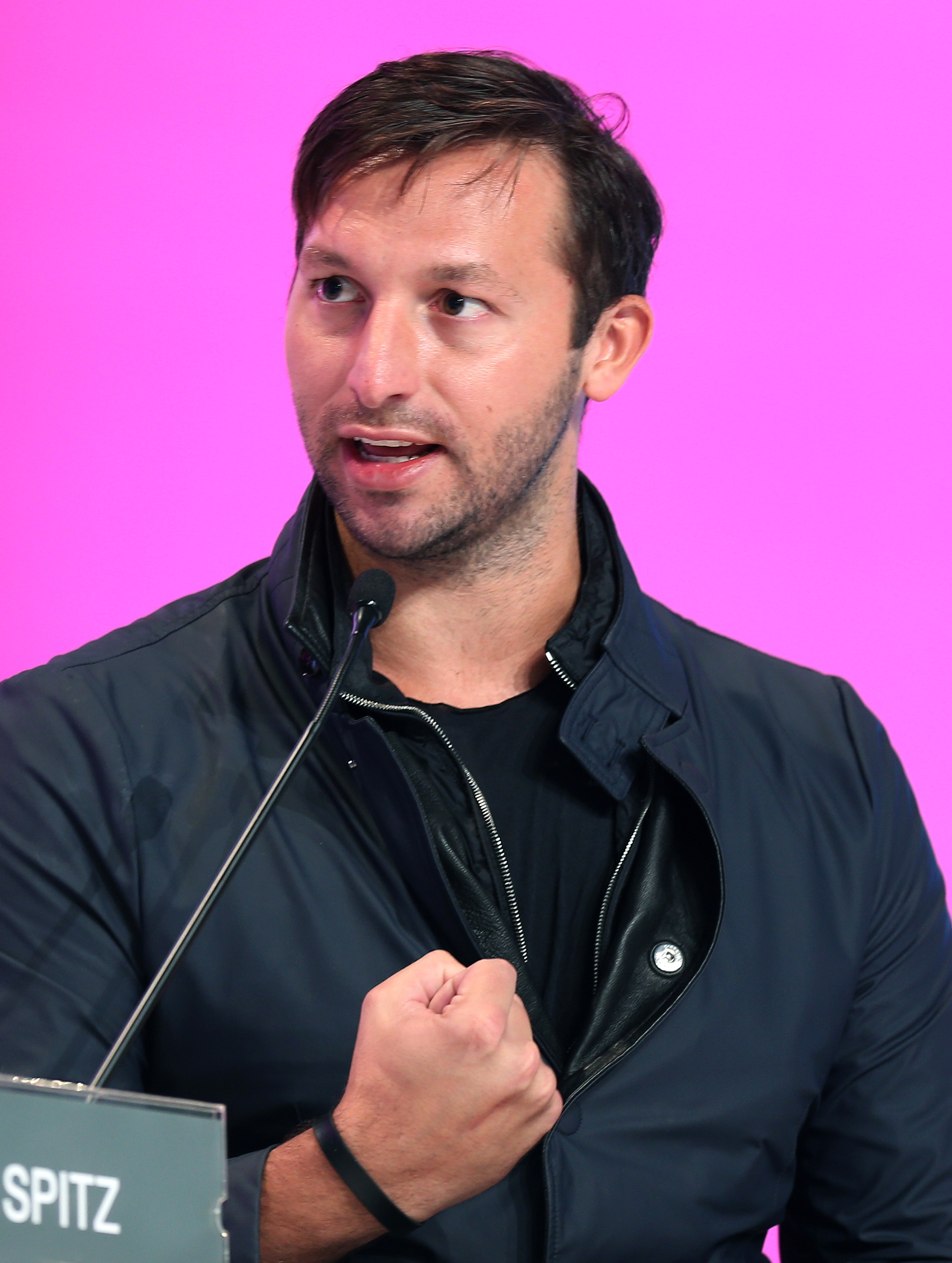
- Thorpe at Doha GOALS Forum 2012

Personal information
- Full name: Ian James Thorpe
- Nicknames: "Thorpedo"; "Thorpey"
- National team: Australia
- Born: 13 October 1982 (age 44) Sydney, Australia
- Height: 1.96 m (6 ft 5 in)
- Weight: 104 kg (229 lb)

Sport
- Sport: Swimming
- Strokes: Freestyle
- Club: SLC Aquadot
- Coach: Doug Frost (1995–2002); Tracey Menzies (2002–2006)
Medal record
Men's swimming
Representing Australia
Event	1st	2nd	3rd
Olympic Games	5	3	1
World Championships (LC)	11	1	1
World Championships (SC)	2	1	0
Pan Pacific Championships	9	3	0
Commonwealth Games	10	1	0
Total	37	9	2
Olympic Games
Gold medal – first place	2000 Sydney	400 m freestyle
Gold medal – first place	2000 Sydney	4×100 m free
Gold medal – first place	2000 Sydney	4×200 m free
Gold medal – first place	2004 Athens	200 m freestyle
Gold medal – first place	2004 Athens	400 m freestyle
Silver medal – second place	2000 Sydney	200 m freestyle
Silver medal – second place	2000 Sydney	4×100 m medley
Silver medal – second place	2004 Athens	4×200 m free
Bronze medal – third place	2004 Athens	100 m freestyle
World Championships (LC)
Gold medal – first place	1998 Perth	400 m freestyle
Gold medal – first place	1998 Perth	4×200 m free
Gold medal – first place	2001 Fukuoka	200 m freestyle
Gold medal – first place	2001 Fukuoka	400 m freestyle
Gold medal – first place	2001 Fukuoka	800 m freestyle
Gold medal – first place	2001 Fukuoka	4×100 m free
Gold medal – first place	2001 Fukuoka	4×200 m free
Gold medal – first place	2001 Fukuoka	4×100 m medley
Gold medal – first place	2003 Barcelona	200 m freestyle
Gold medal – first place	2003 Barcelona	400 m freestyle
Gold medal – first place	2003 Barcelona	4×200 m free
Silver medal – second place	2003 Barcelona	200 m medley
Bronze medal – third place	2003 Barcelona	100 m freestyle
World Championships (SC)
Gold medal – first place	1999 Hong Kong	200 m freestyle
Gold medal – first place	1999 Hong Kong	4×100 m free
Silver medal – second place	1999 Hong Kong	400 m freestyle
Pan Pacific Championships
Gold medal – first place	1999 Sydney	200 m freestyle
Gold medal – first place	1999 Sydney	400 m freestyle
Gold medal – first place	1999 Sydney	4×100 m free
Gold medal – first place	1999 Sydney	4×200 m free
Gold medal – first place	2002 Yokohama	100 m freestyle
Gold medal – first place	2002 Yokohama	200 m freestyle
Gold medal – first place	2002 Yokohama	400 m freestyle
Gold medal – first place	2002 Yokohama	4×100 m free
Gold medal – first place	2002 Yokohama	4×200 m free
Silver medal – second place	1997 Fukuoka	400 m freestyle
Silver medal – second place	1997 Fukuoka	4×200 m free
Silver medal – second place	2002 Yokohama	4×100 m medley
Commonwealth Games
Gold medal – first place	1998 Kuala Lumpur	200 m freestyle
Gold medal – first place	1998 Kuala Lumpur	400 m freestyle
Gold medal – first place	1998 Kuala Lumpur	4×100 m free
Gold medal – first place	1998 Kuala Lumpur	4×200 m free
Gold medal – first place	2002 Manchester	100 m freestyle
Gold medal – first place	2002 Manchester	200 m freestyle
Gold medal – first place	2002 Manchester	400 m freestyle
Gold medal – first place	2002 Manchester	4×100 m free
Gold medal – first place	2002 Manchester	4×200 m free
Gold medal – first place	2002 Manchester	4×100 m medley
Silver medal – second place	2002 Manchester	100 m backstroke

Ian James Thorpe (born 13 October 1982) is an Australian retired swimmer who specialised in freestyle, but also competed in backstroke and the individual medley. He has won five Olympic gold medals, the second most won by any Australian after fellow swimmer Emma McKeon. With three gold and two silver medals, Thorpe was the most successful athlete at the 2000 Summer Olympics, held in his hometown of Sydney. Thorpe is widely considered one of the best swimmers of all time.

At the age of 14, Thorpe became the youngest male ever to represent Australia, and his victory in the 400 metre freestyle at the 1998 Perth World Championships made him the youngest-ever individual male World Champion. After that victory, Thorpe dominated the 400 m freestyle, winning the event at every Olympic, World, Commonwealth and Pan Pacific Swimming Championships until his break after the 2004 Olympics in Athens. At the 2001 World Aquatics Championships, he became the first person to win six gold medals in one World Championship. Aside from 13 individual long-course world records, Thorpe anchored the Australian relay teams, numbering the victories in the 4 × 100 m and the 4 × 200 m freestyle relays in Sydney among his five relay world records. His wins in the 200 m and 400 m and his bronze in the 100 m freestyle at the 2004 Summer Olympics made him the only male to have won medals in the 100–200–400 combination. He acquired the nickname "Thorpedo" because of his speed in swimming. Thorpe announced his retirement from competitive swimming in November 2006, citing waning motivation; he made a brief comeback in 2011 and 2012.

In total, Thorpe has won eleven World Championship gold medals; this is the fifth-highest number of gold medals won by any male swimmer. Thorpe was the first person to have been named Swimming World Swimmer of the Year four times, and was the Australian Swimmer of the Year from 1999 to 2003. His athletic achievements made him one of Australia's most popular athletes, and he was recognised as the Young Australian of the Year in 2000.

== Early years ==
Born in Sydney, Thorpe grew up in the suburb of Milperra and hailed from a sporting family. His father Ken was a promising cricketer at junior level, representing Bankstown District Cricket Club in Sydney's district competition. A talented batsman, he once topped the season's batting averages ahead of former Australian captain Bob Simpson. However, paternal pressure detracted from Ken's enjoyment of cricket, and he retired at the age of 26. Thorpe's mother Margaret played A-grade netball, but he did not inherit his parents' ball skills. His elder sister Christina was advised to take up swimming to strengthen a broken wrist, so by chance, the five-year-old Thorpe followed her into the pool. Due to his unhappy experiences, Ken Thorpe regarded enjoyment as the most critical aspect of his children's participation in sport. A large baby, Thorpe weighed 4.1 kg (9.0 lb) and measured 59 cm (1 ft 11 in) in length at birth.

As a young child, Thorpe was sidelined by an allergy to chlorine. As a result, he did not swim in his first race until a school carnival at the age of seven. The allergy forced Thorpe to swim with his head out of the water; despite this ungainly technique, he won the race, primarily because of his significant size advantage. Thorpe gradually overcame the ailment and progressed to the captaincy of New South Wales for the Australian Primary Schools Championships in 1994. He subsequently won nine individual gold medals at the New South Wales Short Course Age Championships in September of the same year. In 1995, Thorpe started his secondary education at East Hills Boys Technology High School and switched coaches to swim alongside his sister under the tutelage of Doug Frost. It was a busy year for the family; Christina was selected for the Australian team to compete at the 1995 Pan Pacific Swimming Championships in Atlanta. Now six feet tall, Ian competed at his first Australian Age Championships, winning bronze medals in the 200 m and 400 m freestyle. He won all ten events at the New South Wales Age Championships.

=== National competition ===
Thorpe competed at the 1996 Australian Age Championships in Brisbane, winning five gold, two silver and two bronze medals. His times in the 400 m freestyle and 200 m backstroke qualified him for the Australian Championships, which doubled as selection trials for the 1996 Atlanta Olympics. Frost knew that Thorpe had no realistic chance of making the top two in any event, which would have meant Olympic selection at only 13 years and six months. He sent Thorpe to Sydney merely to gain competition experience at senior national level. As expected, Thorpe missed selection; he finished 23rd in the 400 m freestyle and 36th in the 200 m backstroke. At the end of the year, Thorpe qualified for the Australian Short Course Championships. It was another chance to gain national selection, as the event served as the selection trials for the 1997 FINA World Swimming Championships. Thorpe qualified in second place in the heats of the 400 m individual medley and reached his first national final. However, he swam more slowly in the final and missed selection.

At the New South Wales Championships in January 1997, Thorpe's time of 3:59.43 in the 400 m was eight seconds faster than his previous personal best; it made him the first 14-year-old to cover the distance in less than four minutes on Australian soil. Ranked fourth for the event countrywide, Thorpe went into the Australian Championships in Adelaide as a serious contender for selection in the national team for the 1997 Pan Pacific Swimming Championships in Fukuoka, Japan. With a top-three finish and a specific qualifying time required for selection, Thorpe focused on the 400 m freestyle after injuries to world record holder Kieren Perkins and Daniel Kowalski; both had won Olympic medals in the event. Thorpe went on to win bronze behind 16-year-old Queenslander Grant Hackett, setting a new personal best of 3:59.44. The time was a world record for his age group and the race was the first of many battles with Hackett.

Aged 14 years and 5 months, Thorpe became the 463rd and youngest ever male to be selected for the Australian team, surpassing John Konrads' record by one month. Frost said that Thorpe's selection catalysed his eventual focus on freestyle. Thorpe continued his good form at the Australian Age Championships. He contested all twelve events, winning ten individual gold and two bronze medals. He set six Australian records in the process.

== Early international career (1997–1998) ==
=== International debut (1997) ===
1997 Pan Pacific Championships
Silver medal – second place	400 m freestyle	3:49.64
Silver medal – second place	4×200 m freestyle	7:15.72

In June 1997, two months before the Pan Pacific Championships, Thorpe required an appendix operation, which caused him to miss two weeks of training. Upon reaching Japan, Thorpe placed fourth in his heat of the 200 m freestyle with a new personal best time of 1:51.46. Thorpe's time was not enough to qualify for the final, but earned him selection in the 4 × 200 m freestyle relay team. Along with teammates Michael Klim, Ian van der Wal and Hackett, Thorpe claimed silver, making him the youngest ever Pan Pacific medalist. In his first individual final at international level, Thorpe was fifth at the 300 m mark, but fought back to claim silver in the 400 m freestyle behind Hackett in a time of 3:49.64. His finishing burst was to become a trademark, and his time would have been enough to win silver at the Atlanta Olympics. In October 1997, a few days before his fifteenth birthday, Thorpe competed in qualifying trials in Brisbane for the 1998 World Aquatics Championships in Perth. Thorpe gained selection for the world championships by finishing fourth and second in the 200 m and 400 m freestyle respectively. He set new personal bests in both events.

=== 1998 World Aquatics Championships ===
1998 World Championships
Gold medal – first place	400 m freestyle	3:46.29
Gold medal – first place	4×200 m freestyle	7:12.45

Thorpe's first international appearance in his home country, at the 1998 World Championships in Perth, began with the 4 × 200 m freestyle relay. Swimming the third leg after Klim and Hackett, Thorpe broke away from 200 m butterfly Olympic champion Tom Malchow to set a split time of 1:47.67. By the end of Thorpe's leg, the Australians were two seconds ahead of the world record pace, and three seconds ahead of the Americans, having extended the lead by two body lengths. Although anchorman Kowalski finished outside the world record, it was the first time that Australia had won the event at the global level since 1956. Thorpe was ranked fourth in the world before the 400 m final, which Hackett led from the outset. Hackett established a comfortable 2.29 s lead over Thorpe by the 300 m mark, and although Thorpe reduced the margin to 1.53 s at the 350 m mark, Hackett led until Thorpe passed him on the final stroke. Thorpe's time was the fourth fastest in history and made him the youngest ever male individual world champion, aged 15 years and 3 months.

As a result of the media attention generated by his win on home soil, Thorpe received multiple offers for television commercials and was often surrounded by autograph hunters. He became a high-profile supporter of the Children's Cancer Institute, after his sister Christina's future brother-in-law Michael Williams became gravely ill with cancer.

=== 1998 Commonwealth Games ===
1998 Commonwealth Games
Gold medal – first place	200 m freestyle	1:46.70
Gold medal – first place	400 m freestyle	3:44.35
Gold medal – first place	4×100 m freestyle	3:17.83
Gold medal – first place	4×200 m freestyle	7:11.86 (WR)

Thorpe's next competition was in March at the Australian Championships in Melbourne, which were selection trials for the 1998 Commonwealth Games in Malaysia. Thorpe's improvement continued when he defeated Klim in the 200 m freestyle in 1:47.24, faster than Klim's winning time at the World Championship two months earlier. Thorpe's time was a Commonwealth record and with it, he secured his first national title. He then claimed the 400 m freestyle title from Hackett and clocked 50.36 s in the 100 m freestyle. His time earned silver in his first 100 m race at the national level, gaining him Commonwealth selection in three individual events.

Thorpe's rise continued when the Australians arrived in Kuala Lumpur during September for the Commonwealth Games. Thorpe's first event was the 200 m freestyle, where he led throughout to record a time just one hundredth of a second outside Giorgio Lamberti's world record. He then combined with Klim, Kowalski and Matt Dunn in the 4 × 200 m freestyle relay to break the world record of the Unified Team set in 1992 by 0.09 s. Thorpe's run ended when a personal best of 50.21 s in the 100 m freestyle was only sufficient for fourth place, but he returned to victory with the 4 × 100 m freestyle relay team. He claimed a fourth gold in the 400 m freestyle, setting another personal best, just 0.55 s slower than Kieren Perkins' 1994 mark.

Thorpe left school at the end of the year after completing Year 10. His decision caused concerns that concentrating on swimming alone could lead to burn out. Thorpe disagreed, pointing to his informal search for knowledge, stating that "Swimming is a small part of my life". His impact in the swimming community was acknowledged when he became the youngest male swimmer to be named as the Swimming World Swimmer of the Year.

== Record-breaking years (1999–2002) ==
1999 World Short Course Championships
Gold medal – first place	200 m freestyle	1:43.28 (WR)
Gold medal – first place	4×100 m freestyle	3:11.21
Silver medal – second place	400 m freestyle	3:35.64

The year 1999 began with heavy media expectations that Thorpe would inevitably break both 200 m and 400 m world records, given his continuing physical growth. The first opportunity came in late March at the 1999 Australian Championships in Brisbane, which doubled as a selection event for the 1999 Pan Pacific Swimming Championships. Thorpe again won the 400 m, but Perkins' record eluded him, this time by just 0.05 s. Hackett turned the tables in the 200 m event, passing Thorpe in the final 50 m to win Thorpe's title. Although both were outside Lamberti's mark, Hackett went on to break it the following night in a relay event. Thorpe finished the Championships by continuing his improvement in the 100 m freestyle, posting a time of 49.98 s, his first under the 50 s barrier. The Australian team then travelled to Hong Kong for the 1999 World Short Course Championships, where Thorpe broke Lamberti's mark in the 200 m freestyle, the longest standing world record at the time. However, Hackett defeated him in the 400 m. This was the start of a three-year phase where Thorpe was to set his 13 individual long course world records. He led the men's relay team to unprecedented success in relay events, scoring historic victories over the Americans. Thorpe was to peak in 2001 when he became the first person to win six gold medals at one world championships, setting three world records and helping Australia top the medal tally at a global meet for the first time since 1956. In this period, he was named Swimming World Swimmer of the Year three times.

=== 1999 Pan Pacific Championships ===
1999 Pan Pacific Championships
Gold medal – first place	200 m freestyle	1:46.00 (WR)
Gold medal – first place	400 m freestyle	3:41.83 (WR)
Gold medal – first place	4×100 m freestyle	3:16.08
Gold medal – first place	4×200 m freestyle	7:08.70 (WR)

The 1999 Pan Pacific Swimming Championships were held in August at Sydney Olympic Park, and were viewed as a rehearsal for the 2000 Summer Olympics to be held in the same venue. With Thorpe expected to deliver world records at his first international meet in Sydney, the event was shown live on Australian television for the first time. The opening night saw him pitted against Hackett and South Africa's Ryk Neethling in the 400 m freestyle final. The trio reached the 200 m mark in a group, on world record pace, before Thorpe broke away, recording a split time 1.86 s ahead of world-record pace at 300 m. He extended his lead to four body lengths by the 350 m mark and finished in a time of 3:41.83, cutting almost two seconds from the world record, and covering the second half in almost the same time as the first. Talbot reacted to the performance by dubbing Thorpe as "the greatest swimmer we've [Australia] ever had", whilst four-time American Olympic gold medalist Rowdy Gaines, commentating for NBC, said "...he went into a balls-out sprint at 250 – and I have never seen anything like that...I have been around swimming a long time and it's the most amazing swim I've ever seen, hands down." A formula used by the International Swimming Statisticians Association to compare world records in different events gave his performance the highest score of all current world records. Thorpe promptly donated the A$25,000 prize money for breaking the first world record in the pool to charity.

Later the same night, Thorpe anchored the Australians to a historic victory in the 4 × 100 m freestyle final, the first time the United States had lost the event. Thorpe set an Australian record relay split of 48.55 s. Even taking into account a 0.6–0.7 s for a flying relay start, his split time was almost 1 s faster than his individual best of 49.98 s. It was to be the first of many occasions in which he would anchor the Australian relay teams to victory over the Americans, with splits consistently faster than his equivalent individual times. The following night, in the semi-finals of the 200 m freestyle, Thorpe broke Hackett's world record by 0.33 s, clocking 1:46.34. The next day in the final, he again broke the record, lowering it to 1:46.00. He finished his competition by leading off the 4 × 200 m freestyle team with Klim, Hackett and Bill Kirby to victory. Their time lowered their own world record by more than three seconds, completing Thorpe's fourth world record in four nights.

Immediately after the Pan Pacific Championships, Thorpe's management announced his signing to Adidas for an undisclosed six-figure sum, stating that he would race in their new bodysuit. This presented a dilemma, as the national team was sponsored and wore outfits designed by Speedo, leading to months of protracted discussions and uncertainty. To compound his commercial difficulties, Thorpe had an uncertain end to the sporting year when, in October, he broke a bone in his ankle whilst jogging. However his performance throughout the year was recognised when he was again named as the World Swimmer of the Year by Swimming World, and by Swimming Australia as its Swimmer of the Year. In a wider arena, he was named Young Australian of the Year, ABC Sports Star of the Year, and Male Athlete of the Year at the Australian Sports Awards.

=== 2000 Olympic build-up ===
Thorpe started 2000 looking to add a third individual event to his Olympic schedule. He explored his options by contesting the 1500 m freestyle at the New South Wales Championships in January, which he won. Thorpe embarked on a European FINA World Cup tour to hone his racecraft, but this was overshadowed by comments made by German head coach Manfred Thiesmann accusing him of using steroids. Thiseman claimed that Thorpe's physical attributes were symptomatic of steroid use and that his ability to exceed prior records believed to be drug-fuelled made his feats worthy of suspicion. Thorpe's difficulties heightened at the subsequent German leg of the tour in Berlin, when a standoff over a drug-test arose when officials wanted to take an unsealed sample due to lack of containers. After the standoff was resolved, Thorpe proceeded to cut more than 1.5 s from his world short course record in the 200 m freestyle. Given the context of the race, Thorpe rated it as his best-ever performance, ahead of his victories at Olympic and World level. On returning from Europe, Thorpe faced further uncertainty until he was granted permission to wear his Adidas suit instead of the Australian uniforms provided by Speedo.

With the past uncertainties resolved, Thorpe proceeded to the Olympic selection trials at Sydney Olympic Park in May 2000. He again broke his 400 m world record on the first night of racing, lowering it to 3:41.33 to earn his first Olympic selection. The following day, he lowered his 200 m world record to 1:45.69 in the semi-finals, before lowering it again to 1:45.51 in the final. His attempt to secure a third individual berth failed after he finished fourth in the final of the 100 m and withdrew from the 1500 m.

=== 2000 Summer Olympics ===
2000 Summer Olympics
Gold medal – first place	400 m freestyle	3:40.59 (WR)
Gold medal – first place	4×100 m freestyle	3:13.67 (WR)
Gold medal – first place	4×200 m freestyle	7:07.05 (WR)
Silver medal – second place	200 m freestyle	1:45.83
Silver medal – second place	4×100 m medley	3:35.27

Entering the Olympics, the Australian public expected Thorpe to deliver multiple world records and gold medals as a formality; Sydney's Daily Telegraph posted a front-page spread headlined Invincible. Thorpe cruised through the heats of the 400 m on the first morning of competition, posting a new Olympic record and shortening bookmakers' odds to 50–1. By the time the final was held that night, the pressure had intensified—the host nation had yet to win its first gold medal. Thorpe led throughout, and although Italy's Massimiliano Rosolino was within a body length at the 300 m mark, Thorpe's finishing kick extended the final margin to three body lengths. This set a new world record of 3:40.59. Secret tests carried out by the Italian National Olympic Committee prior to the Olympics later showed that Rosolino had abnormal levels of human growth hormone. Rosolino aside, Thorpe had left bronze medallist Klete Keller fifteen metres in arrears.

Thorpe lined up later in the night alongside Klim, Chris Fydler and Ashley Callus to anchor the 4 × 100 m freestyle relay, an event which the Americans had never lost at Olympic level. The third leg ended with Australia only an arm's length ahead of the United States. Thorpe timed his dive much better than Gary Hall Jr., and surfaced a body length ahead. Hall's sprinting ability allowed him to open a lead by the final turn, but Thorpe's finishing kick overhauled him in the final metres, sparking wild celebrations amongst the partisan crowd.

Prior to the 4 × 100 m freestyle relay, Hall posted on his blog: "My biased opinion says that we will smash them (Australia's 4x100m team) like guitars. Historically the U.S. has always risen to the occasion. But the logic in that remote area of my brain says it won't be so easy for the United States to dominate the waters this time." The Australian team responded to Hall's remarks after the race by playing air guitar on the pool deck. Hall recalled the race, saying, "I don't even know how to play the guitar...I consider it the best relay race I've ever been part of. I doff my cap to the great Ian Thorpe. He had a better finish than I had." Another member of Australia's victorious 4x100 team, Michael Klim, recalled that "Hall was the first swimmer to come over and congratulate us. Even though he dished it out, he was a true sportsman".

When Thorpe broke the 200 m freestyle Olympic record in the heats the following morning, his main rival Pieter van den Hoogenband of the Netherlands (with World No. 2 ranked and teammate Michael Kim bypassing the 200 metres) conceded defeat. However, van den Hoogenband showed his hand in the semi-finals by cutting more than a second off his personal best, to set a new world record of 1:45.35. Thorpe qualified second with a personal best of his own, 0.02 s slower, and was under immense pressure to win the final the following day after his double gold on the first night. Van den Hoogenband started quickly and Thorpe chased him, reaching the 100 m mark just 0.04 s behind. Both swimmers turned at 150 m in identical times. As a result of starting harder than usual, Thorpe faded as van den Hoogenband drew away to claim gold and equal his world record, stunning the home crowd. Thorpe touched in 1:45.83, the first time that he had swum slower in the final than in the qualifying rounds. Thorpe would never lose to van den Hoogenband in a long course 200 metres race again.

Thorpe returned to victory when he led off the 4 × 200 m freestyle relay the following night, setting up a 10 m lead over American Scott Goldblatt in the first leg. Although Thorpe was unable to reclaim the individual world record, he, Klim, Kirby and Todd Pearson lowered their world record to 7:07.05, over five seconds ahead of the Americans—the largest winning margin in an Olympic relay for half a century. Thorpe rounded off his Olympics by swimming in the heats of the 4 × 100 m medley relay, and collected a silver medal when the finals quartet finished behind the Americans. Thorpe's performances as Australia's leading medalist for the Games were recognised when the Australian Olympic Committee granted him the honour of carrying the flag at the closing ceremony. With three gold and two silver medals, Thorpe was the most successful athlete at the 2000 Olympic Games. At year's end, he was again named by Swimming Australia as the Swimmer of the Year, but van den Hoogenband usurped him as the leading male swimmer chosen by Swimming World Magazine.

=== 2001 World Aquatics Championships ===
2001 World Championships
Gold medal – first place	200 m freestyle	1:44.06 (WR)
Gold medal – first place	400 m freestyle	3:40.17 (WR)
Gold medal – first place	800 m freestyle	7:39.16 (WR)
Gold medal – first place	4×100 m freestyle	3:14.10
Gold medal – first place	4×200 m freestyle	7:04.66 (WR)
Gold medal – first place	4×100 m medley	3:35.35

With the 2001 Australian Championships held in Hobart in March, Thorpe added the 800 m freestyle to his repertoire, after FINA had added the event for the 2001 World Aquatics Championships. Thorpe began his campaign by successfully defending his 400 m title with a time just 0.17 s outside his world record. The following night in the 800 m event, he drew away from Hackett in the last 100 m to break Kieren Perkins' 1994 world record by over four seconds. He earned his third title by cutting 0.66 s from van den Hoogenband's 200 m world record to set a new mark of 1:44.69. This performance made him the third male after John Konrads and Tim Shaw to hold world records over three distances simultaneously. His subsequent victory in the 100 m freestyle in a new personal best of 49.05 s made him the first since Konrads in 1959 to hold all Australian freestyle titles from 100 m to 800 m. This indicated that he could swim faster at the subsequent World Championships in Fukuoka, where he was looking to regain the ascendancy from van den Hoogenband.

Thorpe arrived in Fukuoka having been chosen by broadcaster TV Asahi as the marketing drawcard of the event. With the 4 × 100 m freestyle relay being held after the 400 m freestyle on the first night, Thorpe appeared to be conserving energy when he reached the 200 m mark two seconds outside his world record. Although he was 0.93 s behind at the final turn, a final 50 m burst in 24.36 s saw him cut a further 0.42 s from his world record. The relay saw him dive in fractionally ahead of American Jason Lezak after Klim, Callus and Pearson had completed the first three legs. Thorpe fell behind in the early half of the leg before kicking away in the closing stages, to seal gold with his fastest-ever relay split of 47.87 s. In the 800 m final, he shadowed Hackett for the first 750 m, staying within a body length. He then broke clear to win by a body length, lowering his world record by over two seconds. The 200 m freestyle rematch with van den Hoogenband provided Thorpe with a chance to rectify his strategy from the Olympics; this time he allowed the Dutchman to lead through the first 100 m. Thorpe pulled even at the 150 m mark and then broke away towards the finishing wall two body lengths clear. He lowered his world record to 1:44.06 in the process, prompting van den Hoogenband to raise his arm aloft.

Thorpe's winning streak was interrupted in the 100 m freestyle when his personal best of 48.81 s placed him fourth, but he returned to form in the 4 × 200 m freestyle relay. Anchoring the team of Klim, Hackett and Kirby, the Australians lowered their world record time by more than two seconds, leaving the Italians more than six seconds in arrears. Having overtaken Klim as Australia's leading 100 m freestyle swimmer, Thorpe was entrusted with anchoring the 4 × 100 m medley relay team on 28 July. After Matt Welsh, Regan Harrison and Geoff Huegill had finished their legs, Thorpe's change left him half a body length behind the new 100 m world champion Anthony Ervin of the United States. The Americans were expected to win, and with his typically slow start, Thorpe turned a body length behind with 50 m remaining. With an American victory seeming inevitable, Thorpe managed to accelerate and deprive Ervin of the lead in the last 5 m. This made Thorpe the only swimmer to have won six gold medals at a World Championships, and the first since Shaw in 1974 to win the 200–400–800 treble. His performances formed the basis for Australia's gold medal win over the United States 13–9. It was also the first time since the 1956 Summer Olympics that Australia had topped the medal tally at a global meet. Thorpe's achievements led to predictions that he could match Mark Spitz's seven gold medals at the 1972 Summer Olympics, which he played down.

=== 2002 Commonwealth Games and Pan Pacific Championships ===
Thorpe began competition in 2002 at the Australian Championships in Brisbane in March, which were used to select the team for the 2002 Commonwealth Games in Manchester and the 2002 Pan Pacific Swimming Championships. After his record six gold medals in Fukuoka, the meet was surrounded by further expectations of world records and speculation that he would match Spitz's seven gold medals. His winning time in the 400 m was the second fastest in history, but such was the expectation on him that his failure to break a world record was the talking point. He claimed the 100 m and 200 m events in times outside his best, making it the first time that he had failed to break a world record at a major meet since 1999. He also experimented by adding the 100 m backstroke to his repertoire, placing second. This earned him a Commonwealth spot in a seventh event, leading to further media speculation that he could match Spitz.

2002 Commonwealth Games
Gold medal – first place	100 m freestyle	48.73
Gold medal – first place	200 m freestyle	1:44.71
Gold medal – first place	400 m freestyle	3:40.08 (WR)
Gold medal – first place	4×100 m freestyle	3:16.42
Gold medal – first place	4×200 m freestyle	7:11.69
Gold medal – first place	4×100 m medley	3:36.05
Silver medal – second place	100 m backstroke	55.38

By this time, Thorpe's relationship with Frost was beginning to unravel. Thorpe had always insisted that his swimming was about enjoyment and improving himself in setting faster times, rather than victory or defeat. This contrasted with Frost, who had a more aggressive and combative mindset, often making bold public statements. Thorpe ignored Frost's advice and bulked up his upper body by a further 5 kg to 105 kg, making him the heaviest elite swimmer in history. His reasoning that the strength gains would outweigh any loss in flexibility raised concerns over his physiological strategy. On the first night in Manchester, Thorpe again lowered his 400 m mark by 0.09 s to 3:40.08, which remains the fastest ever 400m swim not swum in an LZR Racer before anchoring the 4 × 100 m freestyle relay team to another gold. Prior to the 200 m final, Thorpe was seen arguing with Frost in the warm-up area. Thorpe won, but was unusually angry at having failed to lower his previous best, publicly stating that he "wasn't with it" and that he had "one of the worst warm-ups ever". Thorpe did manage to lower his personal best in the 100 m freestyle to 48.73 s en route to his fourth gold, and anchored the 4 × 200 m freestyle and 4 × 100 m medley relays to comfortable victories. When he collected a silver in his first international race in the 100 m backstroke with another personal best behind world champion Matt Welsh, he was forced to rebuff media comparisons to Spitz. He emphasised personal performance, stating "I think it's a limiting attitude to be competing against other people when you can be challenging yourself". Despite Thorpe's assertion that he could not match Spitz, Frost predicted that Thorpe could win nine golds at one Olympics. In spite of the media disappointment, Thorpe's six gold medals equalled the record set by Susie O'Neill, completing all in Games or World record time. As a result, he was awarded the honour of carrying the flag at the closing ceremony.

2002 Pan Pacific Championships
Gold medal – first place	100 m freestyle	48.84
Gold medal – first place	200 m freestyle	1:44.75
Gold medal – first place	400 m freestyle	3:45.28
Gold medal – first place	4×100 m freestyle	3:15.41
Gold medal – first place	4×200 m freestyle	7:09.00
Silver medal – second place	4×100 m medley	3:34.84

The Pan Pacific Championships followed in Yokohama less than a month later, with media speculation about Thorpe and Frost overshadowing the racing. Thorpe began his campaign with a victory over Hackett in the 400 m freestyle in a time five seconds outside his world record. Afterwards, he revealed that both he and Hackett had deliberately conserved energy for the 4 × 100 m freestyle relay later in the night. Australia subsequently won the relay, with Thorpe again overtaking Jason Lezak in the last 50 m. He subsequently won the 200 m freestyle, and anchored the 4 × 200 m freestyle relay to victory to take his tally to four golds. After qualifying second in the 100 m freestyle, Thorpe came from fourth at the 50 m mark win his fifth gold in a time of 48.84 s. Thorpe's run ended in the 4 × 100 m medley relay final, when despite setting the second fastest ever relay split of 47.20 s, Australia were defeated.

== Tracey Menzies era (2003–2006) ==
After the 2002 Pan Pacific Championships, Thorpe announced that he was splitting with Frost to train with one of his assistants, Tracey Menzies, who had no prior international experience. Admitting that tension existed between him and Frost, Thorpe asserted that the split was amicable. He cited waning motivation for the split, stating "I decided I either had to make the change or it was to walk away from the sport". The retired Talbot expressed concerns that Thorpe was making a decision whilst he was physically and emotionally drained, while other coaches felt that the new relationship would end up with Thorpe, rather than Menzies, making the decisions. Despite a turbulent year, he was again named by Swimming World as its World Swimmer of the Year.

Along with the switch of coaches, Thorpe indicated that he would put more focus on improving his sprinting ability. He thus dropped the 800 m freestyle despite being the reigning world champion and record holder. During this period, his times in the 400 m and 200 m freestyle deteriorated, and both he and Menzies were criticised. The criticism continued to mount during their partnership, particularly during the build-up to the 2004 Olympics. Following his victory in the 200 and 400 events in Athens, Thorpe said that his results justified his decision, despite posting substantially faster times as a young swimmer under Frost.

In May 2002, Thorpe also hosted the Australian reality television show Undercover Angels on the Seven Network. The show ran for 11 episodes and was widely panned by media critics.

=== 2003 World Aquatics Championships ===
2003 World Championships
Gold medal – first place	200 m freestyle	1:45.14
Gold medal – first place	400 m freestyle	3:42.58
Gold medal – first place	4×200 m freestyle	7:08.58
Silver medal – second place	200 m medley	1:59.66
Bronze medal – third place	100 m freestyle	48.77

The first major test of Thorpe's partnership with Menzies came at the Australian Championships held in Sydney in March. Thorpe did not threaten any of his world records, completing the 400 m and 200 m freestyle more than two and one seconds respectively off his best. Despite defeating Hackett in both races to retain his titles, he later admitted that he was "pretty disappointed" with his performances. When he tied with Ashley Callus in a time of 49.05 s, he was criticised by The Sydney Morning Herald which stated "The measure of Thorpe's sprinting ability is that he could only match the efforts of a virus-riddled Callus". Thorpe found some relief by setting a new Commonwealth record of 2:00.11 in his first long course 200 m individual medley outing, the fifth fastest time in the past year. Thorpe attracted further criticism when he withdrew from the inaugural Duel in the Pool with a medical complaint, despite travelling overseas for commercial and charity work.

Thorpe arrived for the 2003 World Championships in Barcelona for his first major international competition since Menzies' appointment under heavy media scrutiny following his non-improvement at the Australian Championships. On the first night of competition Thorpe defeated Hackett in the 400 m freestyle in a time 2.5 s outside his world record, making him the first to win three world titles in the same event. After his relatively slow 400 m, he was again under pressure in the 200 m freestyle after van den Hoogenband led at the 100 m mark ahead of world record pace. Thorpe managed to respond and retain his world title, and gained some relief after his sprint training yielded his first medal in the 100 m freestyle at a global competition; he finished third in 48.77 s. In all three freestyle events however, he had swum slower than his times under Frost. He ended his individual campaign on a promising note with his experiment with the 200 m individual medley, setting a new personal best of 1:59.66 to claim silver. Thorpe again anchored the 4 × 200 m freestyle team to retain the world title along with Hackett, Nicholas Sprenger and Craig Stevens, with a reduced margin over the Americans, who finished less than two seconds in arrears. Michael Klim's injuries left the relay teams weakened, with Thorpe anchoring the 4 × 100 m freestyle team to fourth, At the end of a difficult year in the water, his standing had fallen in the eyes of Swimming World, who rated him fourth in the world. He was again named as Australian Swimmer of the Year, jointly with Hackett.

=== 2004 Summer Olympics ===
2004 Summer Olympics
Gold medal – first place	200 m freestyle	1:44.71 (OR)
Gold medal – first place	400 m freestyle	3:43.10
Silver medal – second place	4×200 m freestyle	7:07.46
Bronze medal – third place	100 m freestyle	48.56

After his feats at the 2003 World Championships, Speedo had generated significant media publicity by offering Michael Phelps US$1 million if he could match Spitz's seven golds. Thorpe was adamant that this was impossible, and scrapped his seventh event, the 200 m individual medley from his Olympic program. In late March 2004 at the Australian Championships in Sydney, Thorpe overbalanced whilst on the blocks in the heats of the 400 m freestyle and fell into the water, resulting in his disqualification and ending the defence of his Olympic 400 m title. This resulted in a large debate among the swimming and public community as to whether Thorpe should be given an exception to Australia's policy of selecting the first and second place getters, with Prime Minister of Australia John Howard describing the situation as a "tragedy". Despite the intense media spotlight, Thorpe managed to win the 100 m and 200 m freestyle events to ensure his selection for Athens. Craig Stevens, who had claimed the second qualifying position in the 400 m event, subsequently faced immense public pressure to relinquish his position to Thorpe, and later did so in a television interview for which he was paid. This generated ethical debate as to whether Stevens' decision had been bought, and criticism against Thorpe.

The pressure in the lead-up was further compounded by the media attention surrounding Phelps, who had decided that the 200 m freestyle would be one of the events in his quest for eight gold medals. This prompted many media outlets to label the race between Thorpe, van den Hoogenband, Phelps and Hackett as The Race of the Century. With the press spotlight growing, Thorpe tried to avoid media attention, resulting in a few terse media events. Thorpe's increasing focus on the 100 m event, coupled with the media pressure, resulted in speculation that he was vulnerable to Hackett in the 400 m event. Thorpe made a slow start in the final, reaching the 100 m mark one second outside world record pace. In a topsy-turvy performance at irregular pace, there were multiple changes of lead before Thorpe established a body-length lead by 350 m. He was closed down by Hackett, holding on by only 0.26 s in a time three seconds outside his own world record.

With Klim recently returning from a two-year injury layoff, and Callus ill, Thorpe could only anchor Australia to sixth in the 4 × 100 m freestyle relay. The 200 m began with van den Hoogenband again attacking immediately, reaching the 100 m mark more than a second under the world record split, with Thorpe half a body length behind. Thorpe gradually reduced the lead before passing van den Hoogenband in the last 50 m to win The Race of the Century by half a body length, in a new Olympic record of 1:44.71. Having achieved what had eluded him four years earlier, Thorpe reacted emotionally, immediately tearing off his cap, punching the air and screaming. The next day saw six years of Australian victory in the 4 × 200 m freestyle relay ended when Hackett, Klim and Sprenger had put Thorpe into the final leg 1.48 s behind Keller. Thorpe gradually reduced the margin but was unable to pass Keller in the last lap, the United States touching 0.13 s earlier. Thorpe found himself on the other side of a close result when he qualified last for the 100 m freestyle by 0.01 s. He capitalised in the final by coming from sixth at the 50 m mark to win bronze medal in a personal best of 48.56 s, making him the only person to medal in the 100–200–400 combination in Olympic history. After the Athens Olympics, Thorpe took a break from competitive swimming, skipping the 2005 World Aquatics Championships.

=== 2006: Attempted return and retirement ===
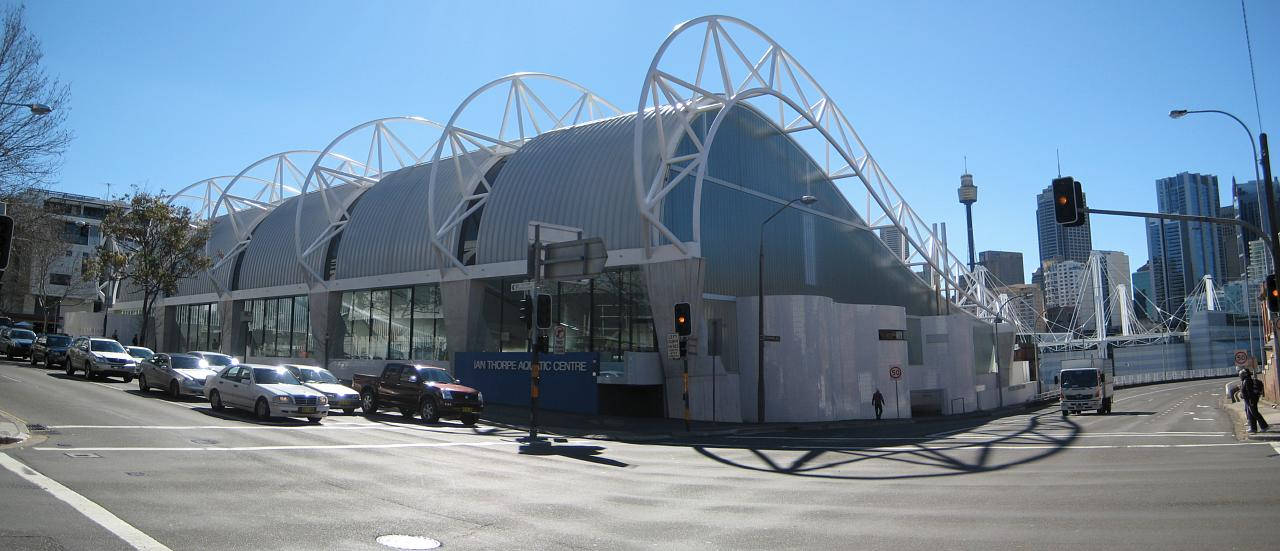
Ian Thorpe Aquatic Centre in Ultimo, Sydney

Thorpe returned to competition at the New South Wales Championships in December 2005. He raced in the 200 m and stated his intention to retire after the 2008 Summer Olympics in Beijing. Thorpe announced that due to a desire to concentrate on the 100 m freestyle, he had dropped his pet event, the 400 m. He was unmoved by national coach Alan Thompson, who implored him to continue swimming the event. In February, Thorpe qualified for the 2006 Commonwealth Games by winning the 100 m and 200 m freestyle in times of 49.24 s and 1:46.42 respectively. He expressed disappointment with his performances; he speculated that he may have misjudged his new training schedule and anticipated further improvement.

Soon after, Thorpe announced his withdrawal from the Commonwealth Games due to a bout of bronchitis, which had stopped him from training. Thorpe's illness was later diagnosed as a strain of glandular fever, and after a further delay caused by a broken hand, he moved to the United States in July to work with Dave Salo. Further disruption followed when the Australian switched coaches, citing excessive and ongoing media attention. Thorpe's stay was constantly surrounded by rumours that he was suffering from ill discipline; this fuelled speculation that his international career was on the decline.

Upon his return to Australia, Thorpe withdrew from the selection trials for the 2007 World Championships and announced his retirement on 21 November 2006. Thorpe said that he had been contemplating retirement for some time, but was afraid of the future because swimming had given him a "safety blanket". Thorpe stated that he retired despite reaching higher levels of fitness, noting "As I got fit, physically fit, my mind also got fit". He said a clear mind allowed him to reach his decision. He was close to tears when thanking the Australian public, but declared that his retirement was a "joyous" occasion of celebration.

In 2007, the French sports newspaper L'Équipe claimed that Thorpe "showed 'abnormal levels' of two banned substances in a doping test" in 2006 prior to his retirement. Thorpe denied the charges. The Australian Sports Anti-Doping Authority (ASADA) confirmed that they had investigated Thorpe in the past, for abnormal levels of testosterone and luteinising hormone (LH), but had dismissed the result. FINA dropped its investigation and closed the case. Thorpe has never been found to have used banned substances, and has denied allegations against him while also speaking out against drug use. He has called for the introduction of blood testing, promised to surrender a frozen sample for retrospective testing and repeatedly criticised FINA for drug-testing procedures that he regards as inadequate.

== Comeback (2011–2012) ==
In February 2011, Thorpe announced that he would come out of retirement and attempt to qualify for the 2012 Olympics in London. Thorpe's major focus was the 100 m and 200 m freestyle at 2012's trials, stating he could offer the most value to the Australian team in the relays. He would not swim the 400 m, claiming he would not have enough time to build up endurance for that event.

Thorpe swam the 100 m butterfly and 100 m medley in Singapore (4–5 November) and Beijing (8–9 November) before also taking on the 100 m freestyle in the Tokyo (12–13 November) round of the 2011 FINA Swimming World Cup.

=== 2012: Australian Olympic Trials and aftermath ===
Thorpe's comeback attempt in the 200 m freestyle came to an abrupt end on Day Two of Australia's Olympic Trials in Adelaide, on 16 March 2012. No longer allowed to wear the full-body racing suit (covering from neck to ankles and wrists) banned by FINA rule changes, he competed wearing just the "jammer" (hip to thigh) racing shorts. He swam very well in the morning heats, cruising to 1:49.18, a time which placed him equal fifth fastest. However, in the semi-finals that evening he faded over the last 100 metres, finishing in 12th place at 1:49.91. Speaking to reporters immediately afterwards, Thorpe said, "The last 100 was a struggle, I'm not sure why. This was slower than what I swam this morning, probably the inexperience of racing in the last 18 months held me up. The fairytale has turned into a nightmare." In the 100 m freestyle on day 3 (17 March), Thorpe won his heat (the 9th of 12) but failed to break 50 seconds and did not advance to the semi-finals with the top 16 sprinters. Thus, his bid to qualify for the London Olympics officially ended.

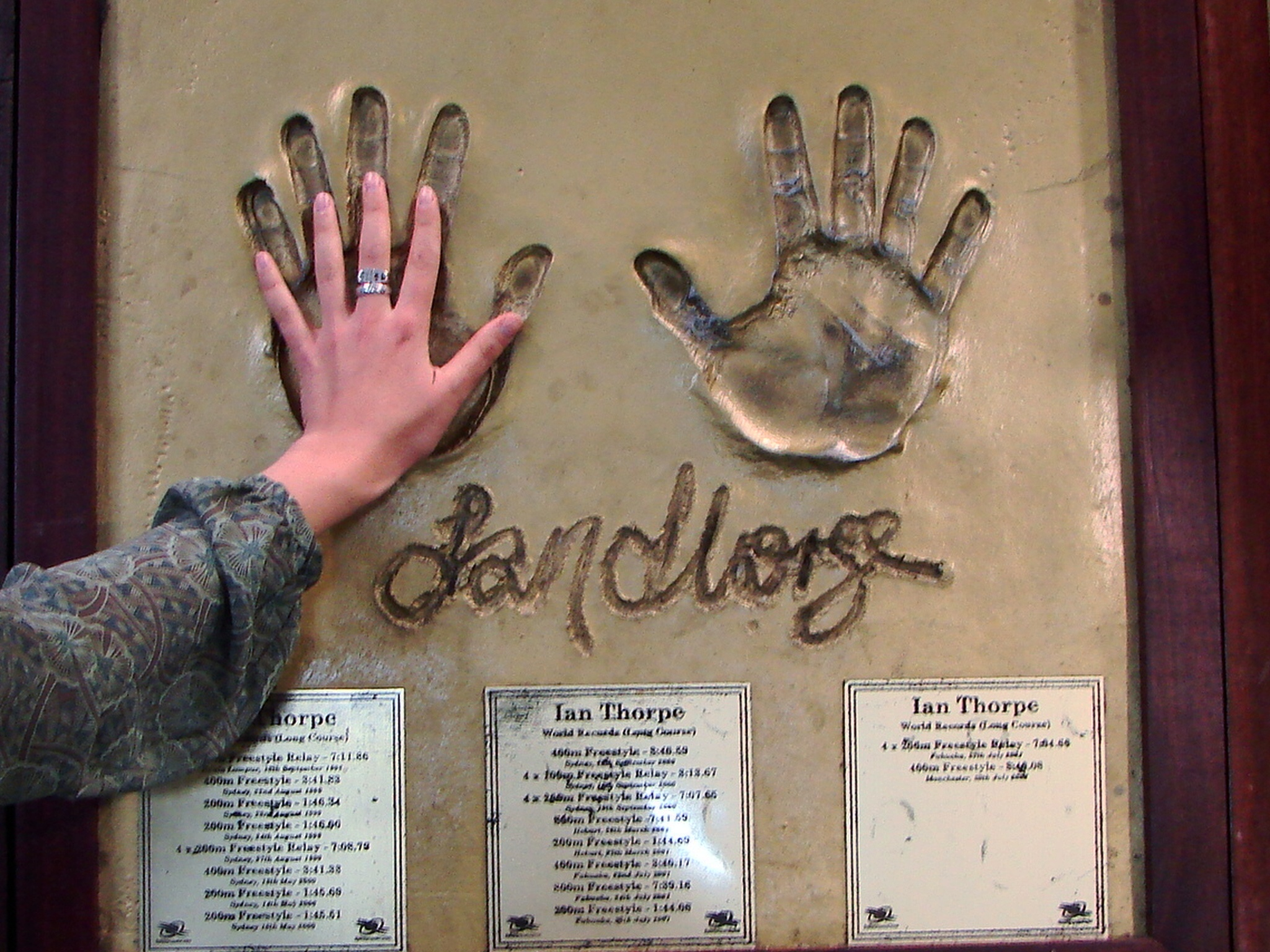
Ian Thorpe's hand prints at the Sydney Aquatic Centre.

It was subsequently announced that Thorpe was targeting qualification for the 2013 World Championships in Barcelona and later the 2014 Commonwealth Games in Glasgow, but was forced to abandon his plans due to a shoulder injury.

== Athletic attributes ==
Thorpe's success has been attributed to his work ethic, mental strength, powerful kick, ability to accelerate and a physiology suited to swimming. This led former Australian head coach Don Talbot to label him as "the greatest swimmer the world has seen". Although Swimming World labelled Thorpe's technique as "extraordinary" and "superior", Talbot disagreed, stating his belief that Thorpe relied on his kick too heavily at the expense of his arms. He also cited Thorpe's ability to manage his workload and his day-to-day recovery between races during a meet as a deficiency. Thorpe was known for using his trademark six-beat kick to power away from his rivals in the closing stages of races, the effectiveness of which was attributed to his unusually large size 17 feet.

Following his retirement, head coach of the US men's swimming team Bob Bowman—who also mentors Michael Phelps—called Thorpe "the greatest middle-distance swimmer of all time and...the greatest relay swimmer I have seen". Bowman further cited Thorpe's ability to raise the profile and popularity of swimming, noting that Phelps' public image was modelled on that of the Australian. Australian Olympic Committee President John Coates stated that "In 50 years from now Australians will still marvel at the feats of Ian Thorpe". Dawn Fraser, the first of only two swimmers to win the same Olympic event three times, said that Thorpe was the "greatest [freestyle] swimmer in the world", and lamented that he would not be attempting a hat-trick of 400 m titles.

== Honours ==
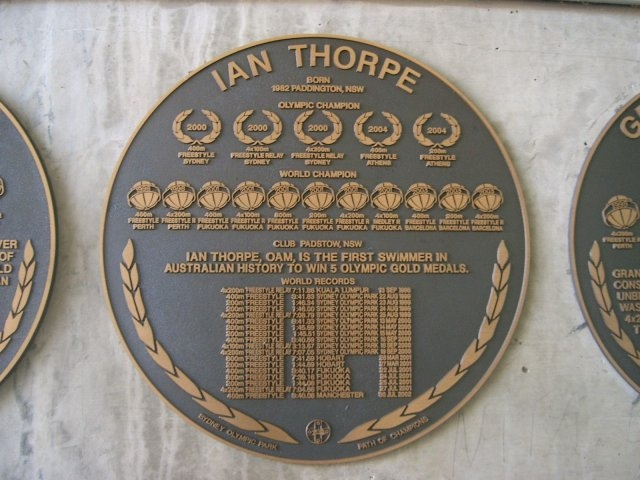
Plaque of Ian Thorpe Outside Sydney Olympic Park Aquatic Centre.

Aside from his swimming achievements, Thorpe has received numerous honours and accolades during his life, including:

- 2000: Young Australian of the Year
- 2000: The Australian Sports Medal as "Commonwealth Games Pan Pacific World Record Holder".
- 2001: Awarded Medal of the Order of Australia (OAM) for service to sport as a gold medallist at the Sydney 2000 Olympic Games.
- 2001: The Centenary Medal for "service to Australian society through the sport of swimming".
- 2007: Ian Thorpe Aquatic and Fitness Centre in Ultimo, Sydney named in his honour.
- 2012: Awarded Human Rights Medal for his charity work with Indigenous children.
- 2013: Conferred an honorary Doctor of Letters by the University of Western Sydney for his support for health and education services for Indigenous youth.
- 2014: Conferred an honorary Doctor of Letters by the Macquarie University in recognition of his extraordinary contribution for the sport, philanthropy and Indigenous rights.
- 2019: Advanced to Member of the Order of Australia (AM) in recognition of his "significant service to youth and Indigenous education through charitable initiatives, and to swimming."
- 2022: Swimming Australia Hall of Fame inaugural inductee.

== Post-swimming career ==
Thorpe presented a two-part television documentary called Bullied on ABC Television, using hidden-camera footage to give a victim's-eye-view of bullying. It aired 14 March 2017. In 2021, Thorpe competed in Celebrity MasterChef Australia (series 2) and was fourth to be eliminated. During the series, the judges referred to Thorpe having written two cookbooks, "Cook For Your Life", published in 2011 and "Eat Well Now", released in 2016.

In December 2025, Thorpe made his debut as a yachtsman for LawConnect in its bid for third consecutive line honours for Sydney to Hobart yacht race.

== Personal life ==
=== Sexuality ===
In a July 2014 televised interview with British talk show host Michael Parkinson, Thorpe came out as gay, after years of denying his homosexuality publicly. He stated "I'm comfortable saying I'm a gay man. And I don't want people to feel the same way I did. You can grow up, you can be comfortable and you can be gay." He added "I am telling the world that I am gay… and I hope this makes it easier for others now, and even if you've held it in for years, it feels easier to get it out."

In 2016 he began dating model Ryan Channing. In December 2017, he said he did not plan to marry his boyfriend "any time soon". He would like to become a father. In June 2019, Thorpe split with Channing. Channing later died in Bali, Indonesia in May 2022.

In September 2020, the International Olympic Committee published a question and answer format interview with Thorpe, which touched on his sexual orientation and some of the challenges he faced due to his homosexuality in competitive swimming.

=== Activism ===
In the lead up to the Australian Marriage Law Postal Survey, Thorpe campaigned for a 'yes' vote, encouraging people to enroll to vote at the City2Surf. He later appeared in a campaign advertisement with his partner saying Thorpe could update his electoral details faster than he could swim 100 metres.

=== Sponsorship ===
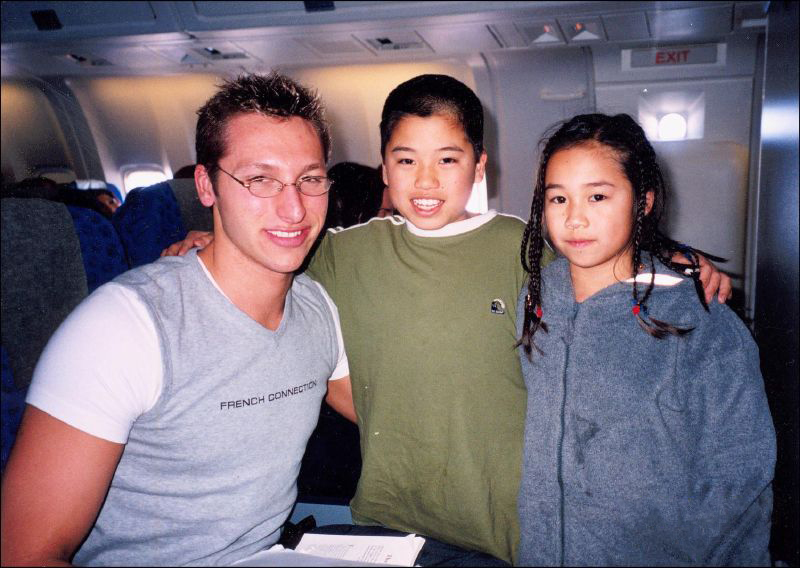
Thorpe (left) with fans in 2000.

Thorpe is known for his interests in fashion, and serves as an ambassador for Armani, and has his own line of designer jewellery and underwear. During his career, Thorpe was one of the most prominent and popular sportspeople in Australia. Despite competing in a sport in which the vast majority of international athletes' earnings are below the poverty line, marketing surveys consistently ranked Thorpe as the most sought-after Australian athlete for sponsorship deals, surpassing footballers who compete on a weekly basis in much larger stadia. Aside from his swimsuit sponsor Adidas, Thorpe was sponsored by Australian corporate giants such as Qantas, Telstra, and the Seven Network.

Thorpe's interests in fashion and culture led him to make frequent visits to New York City—which he describes as a second home—often for engagements with Armani and particularly because of the city's status as a global fashion capital. He was present at the World Trade Center on the morning of 11 September 2001, having stopped there on his jog, before returning to his hotel after forgetting his camera. It was during this trip that he appeared on The Tonight Show with Jay Leno, which was notable because of the relative lack of interest in competitive swimming in America. Thorpe later became a spokesperson for the unsuccessful New York bid for the 2012 Summer Olympics, even promising to continue his career until the games if New York won the hosting rights. Thorpe's interests have also seen him involved in television. In 2002, he played the lead role in the reality television show Undercover Angels, which imitated the Charlie's Angels series. In the program, Thorpe directed three young women who performed good deeds for people in need. Although it averaged more than a million viewers per episode, it was widely panned by critics. Thorpe has also appeared as an extra in the American sitcom Friends.

Thorpe is widely popular in Asia, particularly Japan. In 2000, TV Asahi identified him as the swimmer likely to be the most successful at the 2001 World Championships in Fukuoka, so they selected him as the event's marketing figurehead. In the lead-up, Thorpe visited Japan to promote Asahi in a series of television events, and upon returning for the competition, he was mobbed at the airport by youthful crowds 25 m deep; hundreds camped outside the Australian team's hotel. He was also praised by older sections of Japanese society as a role model for youth, due to what they interpreted as his humility and work ethic. It was estimated that more than 80% of the Japanese public watched his races on television. In 2002, in the wake of a tourism slump after 11 September terrorist attacks, Thorpe agreed to be an ambassador for the Australian Tourism Commission in Japan. The high-profile campaign included a meeting with the Japanese Prime Minister Junichiro Koizumi. The marketing drive resulted in an upturn in Japanese tourism to Australia, which was credited to Thorpe. In 2005, Yakult released a 'Thorpedo' energy drink—which featured a picture of the swimmer on the bottle—in Japan. This was part of an equity deal with the So Natural food group, in which Thorpe was given a 5% stake in the company—at the time worth A$1.1 m—in return for the use of his name and image on their products. The 15-year deal covers East and Southeast Asia and Thorpe's share in the venture could increase to 50% depending on its success.

=== Philanthropy ===
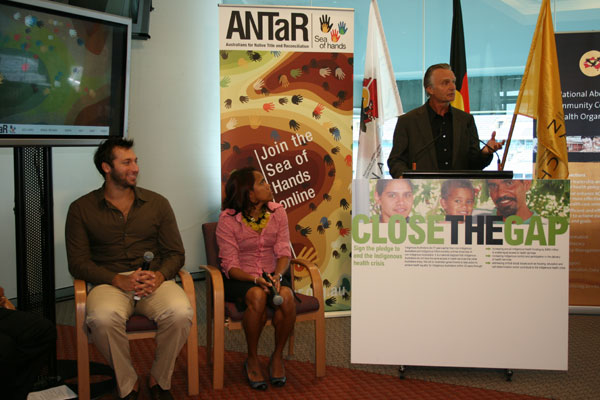
Ian Thorpe (left), with Cathy Freeman and Jeff McMullen, at the launch of Close the Gap

More recently, Thorpe has also emerged as a philanthropist, starting the charity Ian Thorpe's Fountain for Youth in 2000. The organisation raises funds for research into childhood illnesses and sponsors a school in Beijing for orphaned children with disabilities. In addition, it works with The Fred Hollows Foundation to improve health standards and living conditions in Australian aboriginal communities. Citing a wish to "...work directly with our Aboriginal partners and not compete for the meagre funding available from public and corporate donations" the organisation was liquidated in 2014.

=== Depression ===
In 2014, it was confirmed that Thorpe had been admitted to a rehabilitation clinic after neighbours found him dazed near his parents' Panania home. Thorpe was taken to Bankstown Hospital by police before being admitted to a rehabilitation clinic. In his 2012 autobiography This is Me, Thorpe stated he had considered suicide and had drunk 'huge quantities' of alcohol to deal with 'crippling depression'.

== See also ==
- Ian Thorpe: The Swimmer, 2012 documentary
- Ian Thorpe and drug testing
- Ian Thorpe Aquatic and Fitness Centre
- LGBT athletes in the Olympics
- List of Australian Olympic medalists in swimming
- List of Commonwealth Games medallists in swimming (men)
- List of Olympic medalists in swimming (men)
- World record progression 200 metres freestyle
- World record progression 400 metres freestyle
- World record progression 800 metres freestyle
- World record progression 4 × 100 metres freestyle relay
- World record progression 4 × 200 metres freestyle relay

== Published works ==
- Thorpe, Ian; Wainwright, Robert (25 October 2012). This is Me. Simon and Schuster Australia. ISBN 978-1-4711-0122-9.

== Bibliography ==
- Andrews, Malcolm (June 2000). Australia at the Olympics. Sydney, New South Wales: ABC Books. ISBN 0-7333-0884-8.
- Hunter, Greg (2004). Ian Thorpe: The Biography. Sydney, New South Wales: MacMillan. ISBN 1-4050-3632-X.
- Swanton, Will (2002). Ian Thorpe Early Years. Melbourne, Victoria: Legend Books. ISBN 1-877096-12-1.
- Talbot, Don; Heads, Ian; Berry, Kevin (2003). Talbot: Nothing But the Best. South Melbourne, Victoria: Lothian. ISBN 0-7344-0512-X.

Records
Preceded by Kieren Perkins	Men's 400-metre freestyle world record holder (long course); 22 August 1999 – 26 July 2009	Succeeded by Paul Biedermann
Preceded by Grant Hackett; Pieter van den Hoogenband	Men's 200-metre freestyle world record holder (long course); 23 August 1999 – 17 September 2000; 27 March 2001 – 27 March 2007	Succeeded by Pieter van den Hoogenband; Michael Phelps
Preceded by Kieren Perkins	Men's 800-metre freestyle world record holder (long course); 26 March 2001 – 27 July 2005	Succeeded by Grant Hackett
Awards and achievements
Preceded by Bryan Gaensler	Young Australian of the Year; 2000	Succeeded by James Fitzpatrick
Preceded by Michael Klim; Pieter van den Hoogenband	Swimming World; Swimmer of the Year; 1998–1999; 2001–2002	Succeeded by Pieter van den Hoogenband; Michael Phelps
Preceded by Michael Klim; Kosuke Kitajima	Swimming World Pacific Rim; Swimmer of the Year; 1998–2002; 2004	Succeeded by Kosuke Kitajima; Grant Hackett
