= Cook and Phillip Park Aquatic and Fitness Centre =

Swimming centre in Sydney, Australia

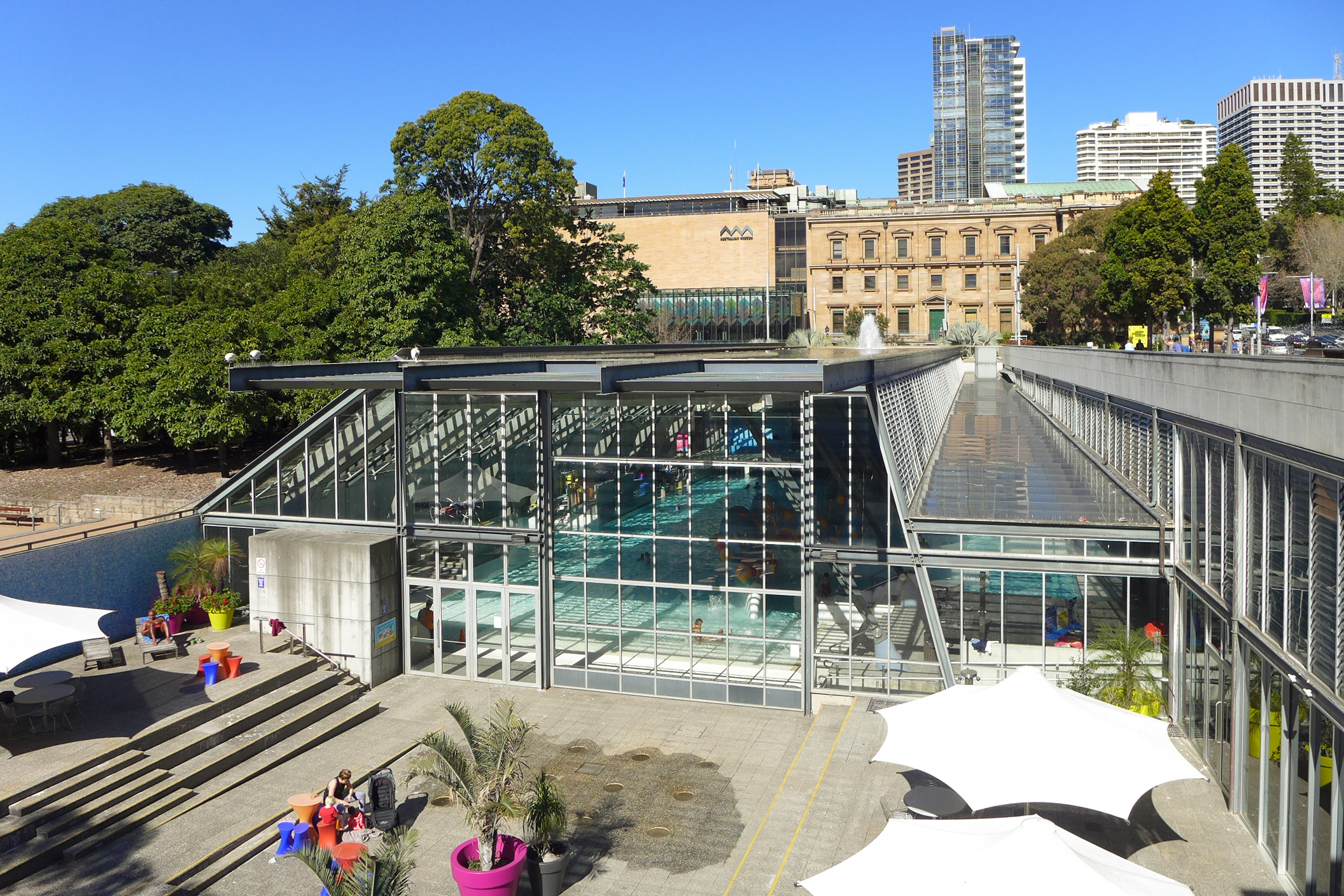
- Cook Phillip Park Pool in 2017
- Interactive map of Cook and Phillip Park Aquatic and Fitness Centre
- Location: 4 College Street, Sydney, NSW, 2000
- Coordinates: 33°52′24″S 151°12′47″E
- Owner: City of Sydney Council
- Operator: Belgravia Leisure
- Type: Fitness and aquatic centre
- Facilities: gymnasium, indoor basketball court, lap pool, recreational pool, toilets
- Dimensions: Length: 50 metres (160 ft)

Construction
- Opened: 1999; 27 years ago

Website
- Cook + Phillip Park

Cook and Phillip Park Aquatic and Fitness Centre is a recreational facility in the Central Business District of Sydney.

It was co-designed by architect Lawrence Nield of Bligh Voller Nield and landscape architect Spackman Mossop and has been plagued by construction issues and criticism since its opening in 1999.

The Centre has a 50-metre swimming pool, leisure pool, gym and a multi-functional indoor court that is used for basketball and indoor soccer. Cook and Phillip is one of a number of facilities owned by the City of Sydney, that includes Ian Thorpe Aquatic and Fitness Centre, Andrew Boy Charlton Pool, Victoria Park Pool and Prince Alfred Park Pool.

== Location ==
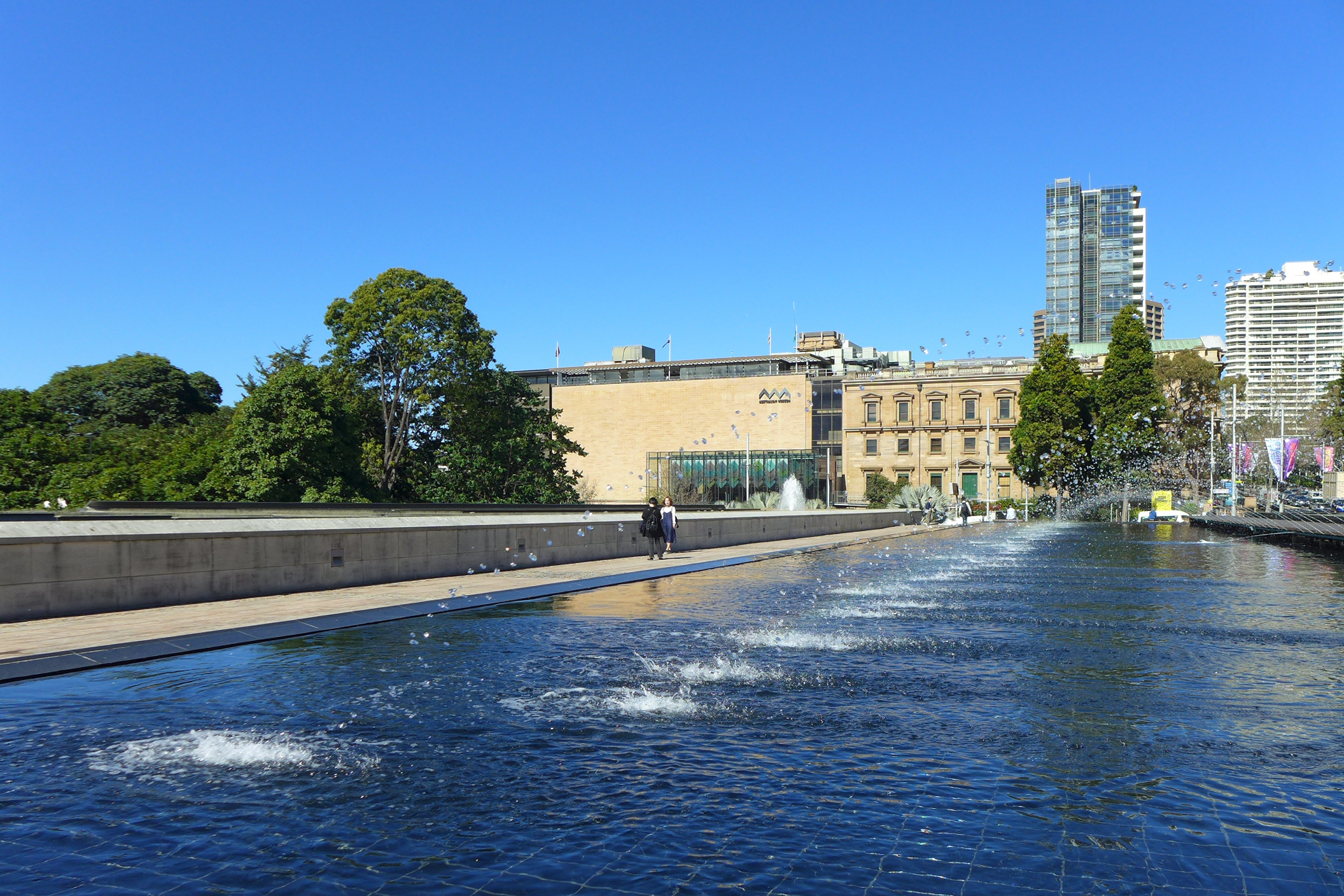
Fountain opposite the roof of the Cook and Phillip park aquatic centre

The Centre is located within Sydney's Central Business District in Cook and Phillip Park. The park lies between William Wardell's 1862 St Mary's Cathedral and James Barnet's wing of the Australian Museum. The Centre is on the corner of William and College Streets and lies beneath Cathedral Square.

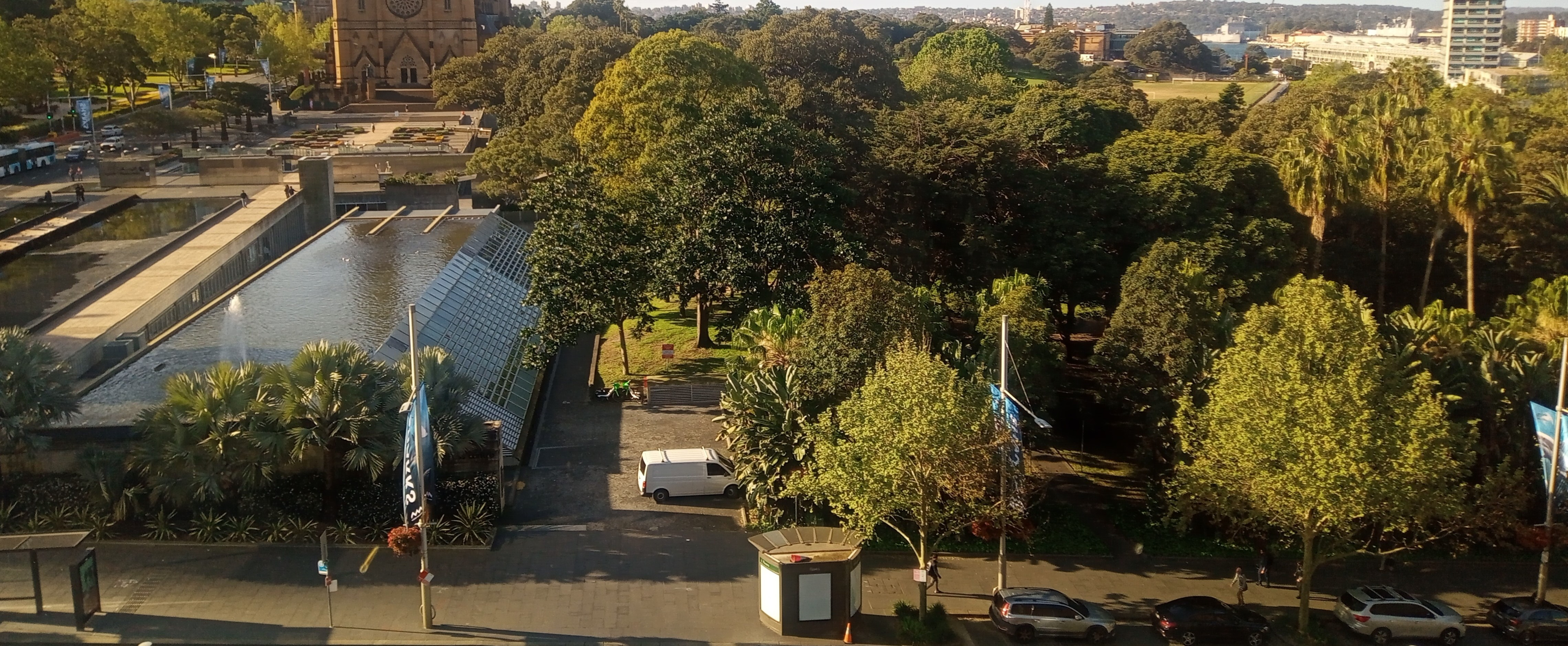
Roof of the Cook and Phillip Park Aquatic Centre bottom left

== Construction history ==
The original site of the Cook and Phillip Park Centre consisted of a park divided by two roads and the privately owned, City Bowling Club. Former Lord Mayor of Sydney Frank Sartor was the driving force behind the development when he unveiled preliminary plans for a $30 million revamp of the site in September 1996. The plan for the site was to create a contemporary park precinct within Sydney's CBD. The strategy for the Centre was applauded by architecture critic Elizabeth Farrelly, who said that it would be "substantially increasing the city's open space quotient, creating a new public amenity and offering an exciting urban opportunity, you'd have to say it's pretty hard to beat".

The City of Sydney appointed co-designers in Bligh Voller Nield and landscape architect Spackman Mossop with construction commencing in November 1997. The development involved the removal of the bowling club and Boomerang Street and Haig Avenue. The Centre was officially opened by Lord Mayor Frank Sartor in August 1999 after months of delays and nearly $10 million over-budget.

== Design ==
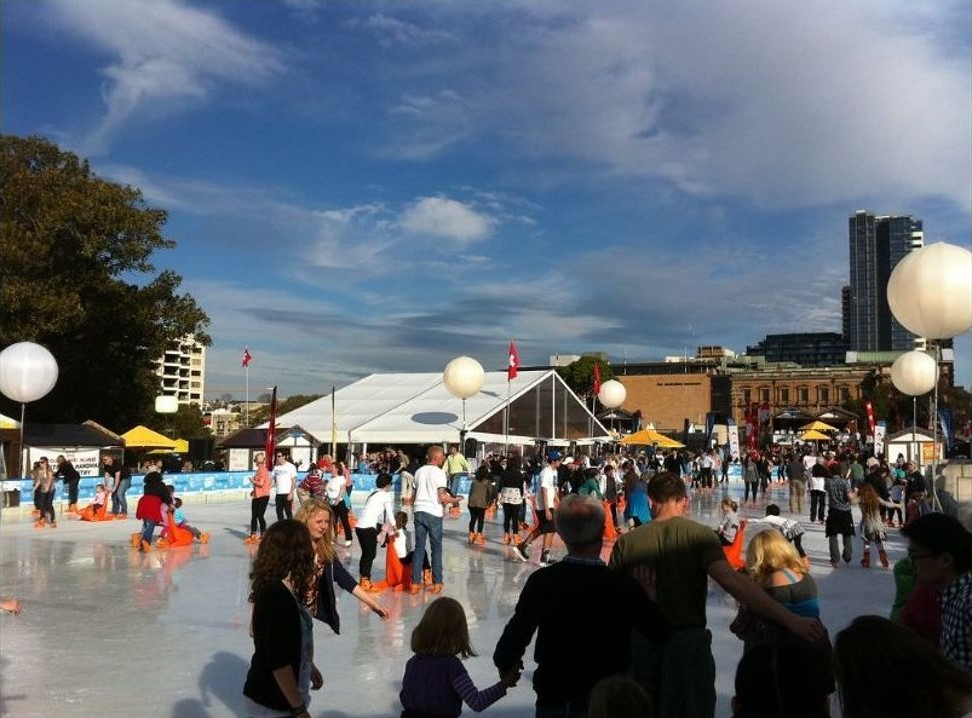
Ice skating near Cook and Phillip Park aquatic centre.

Lawrence Nield was the leading architect for the design, with his past sporting projects including the Sydney Olympic Park Tennis Centre.

Architecturally the building layout responds to two main grids, the CBD grid running parallel with College Street and the former East Sydney grid. As the Centre is on a steep slope, the design incorporates a series of terraces that link the urban park and the building. The building is slowly revealed as one moves through the site down the terraced landscape.

On the development, Nield said that he felt a "special affection" for the Cook and Phillip Park Aquatic and Fitness Centre "whose innovative structure supports a system of pools and paving that make its roof into a fine civic space in a sensitive area of the city, forming a complex piazza that serves both as the parvise of St Mary's Cathedral and as the forecourt for the Australian Museum."

The design was described by architect Richard Goodwin as a "fairly minimal gesture" with a "sloping roof glass facade"and a "mixture of a grand minimal gesture with a series of machines for facilitation of the public". Goodwin also said that it could be "more accurately described as a giant roof built over a sports complex which has been neatly inserted into the side of the fill".

== Construction issues ==
The Centre has been beset by structural issues since its opening in 1999. In 2006, pool manager Jason Konrads said that, "Our roof has been leaking ever since we opened in 1999". Problems have included leaking water features, stained ceilings, concrete spalling, failed glazing and degraded finishes. The Cathedral Square area above the Centre has also been subjected to graffiti and has largely been neglected. These problems caused the Centre to be renovated in 2006. The works cost around $10 million and included fixing the leaking roof, removing the vacant café and altering the appearance of the forecourt. The renovations were finished in 2007. In May 2014, Sydney Mayor Clover Moore allocated $4.7 million to the Centre for further refurbishments.

== Critical reception ==
The Centre and BVN Architects received a number of awards for the overall design, including the 2001 BDP National Urban Design Award and the 2001 RAIA NSW Civic Design Award. The RAIA NSW Civic Design Award jury said that there was an "overwhelming response from the public in support of the Cook and Phillip Centre".

However, the Centre has been labelled "Frank's Folly" after Sartor and was derided as an "eyesore". Architect Clive Lucas said that "it's full of skateboarders, seagulls and pigeons and it's just become a slum", Farrelly labelled it a "gloomy underground pool" and former Prime Minister Paul Keating described the area in front of the Centre as a "wasteland".

== Interior artwork ==
Along the walls of the 50-metre pool within the Cook and Phillip Park Aquatic and Fitness Centre are eight paintings by Sydney artist Wendy Sharpe that depict the life of Australian Annette Kellerman, a swimmer and performer who overcame a number of obstacles to become a world champion. The paintings are there to provide inspiration to the public and an example of human struggle and achievement. The artworks were completed in 1999 on vinyl ester panels for the opening of the Centre.

== Awards ==
- 2001 BDP National Urban Design Award
- 2001 RAIA NSW Civic Design Award
