= Jack Ridley (swim coach) =

American swimmer and swimming coach

Jack Ridley, Jr.
Biographical details
- Born: circa 1947
- Education: Central Washington University

Playing career
- '64-'68 Circa: Central Washington State
- Position: freestyle

Coaching career (HC unless noted)
- 1971-1976: Lake Washington Swim Club
- 1978-1995: Chinook Swim Club
- 1974-1984 circa: Newport High School; Girls' Coach
- 1988-1995: Mercer Island High School; Boys' Coach
- 1994: Head Coach Turkish Olympic Team

Accomplishments and honors

Championships
- 76-82 Washington State High School Champs (Newport High School Girls)

Awards
- 2007 WISCA Hall of Fame; NISCA D. H. Robertson; Excellence in Coaching Award

Jack Ridley is a former competitive swimmer who was an All American at Central Washington University and a Hall of Fame swim coach best known for coaching the Lake Washington and Chinook Swim Clubs in the greater Seattle area from around 1971–1995, and the six-time state championship girls swim team at Newport High School in nearby Bellevue, Washington from 1976-1982.

== High School swimming ==
Ridley attended and swam for the Hudson's Bay High School Eagles in Vancouver, Washington, under Coach Lowel Neil. In a February 1963 meet, he won the 200-yard freestyle in 2:04.6, and the 100-yard freestyle in 55.8. The Hudson's Bay Eagles swim team went undefeated in Ridley's Senior year, and took a third place at the State Meet.

== College swimming ==
He was a National Association of Intercollegiate Athletics (NAIA) finalist for four years at Central Washington University in Ellensburg, Washington, where he swam under accomplished coaches Tom Anderson and Bob Gregson from around 1964–68. He earned All-American honors at Central Washington. In March 1964, Ridley competed in the 50, 100, 1,650-yard and freestyle relay events at the NAIA Swim Championships in St. Paul, Minnesota. As an underclassman at Washington State he took a sixth place in the 100 freestyle with a :51.6, helping to lead Central Washington State to a team third place at the NAIA Championships at LaCrosse University in LaCrosse, Wisconsin on March 20, 1965. Ridley helped Central Washington win successive Evergreen Conference Championships, taking a conference record time of 22.8 seconds in the 50-yard freestyle in the Evergreen Conference Championships on February 24–5, 1967. His time equalled his own conference record set the previous year.

== Coaching ==
Ridley's first and longest serving coaching position was with the Lake Washington Swim Club in the greater Seattle area, where he coached from 1971 to 1976, and then after a merger with Mercer Island's Chinook Swim Club around 1978 continued coaching the Chinook Club through 1995. He coached Olympian and World Record Holder Jo Harshbarger at Lake Washington Swim Club. While at Mercer Island's Chinook Swim Club, he coached Mary Wayte, an Olympic medalist, and also coached American National Champion Ugur Taner at Chinook. Ridley accompanied Harshbarger to the 1972 Montreal Olympics, and they were later married.

He was the girls' swimming coach at Newport High School in Bellevue, Washington from around 1974–1984, coaching a total of ten years. The Newport Girls' team won six consecutive Washington State Girls' Championship titles from 1976 to 1982, with Ridley continuing to coach the girls' team through at least 1984. He coached the boys' team at Newport for a period in the mid-70's. He coached the Mercer High School Boys' team from 1988 to 1995. In his swimming career, he managed, trained and mentored 54 All-American swimmers.

He served as the head coach of the Turkish men’s national swim team during the Summer Olympic Games in Barcelona in 1992.

Ridley coached American swimmers twice at World Swimming Championships and in a number of international competitions. As of 2012, he was living in Vancouver, Washington, and working as an Assistant Senior Coach at Portland Aquatic Club.

== Honors ==
Ridley became a member of the Pacific Northwest Swimming Hall of Fame in 2004, and in 2007 became a member of the Washington Interscholastic Swim Coaches Association Hall of Fame. He has also been honored with the National Interscholastic Swimming Coaches Association (NISCA) David H. Robertson Excellence in Coaching Award.
