= Undercover Angels =

- Presented by: Ian Thorpe
- Starring: Jackie O Katie Underwood; Simone Kessell
- Country of origin: Australia

Original release
- Network: Seven Network
- Release: 12 May 2002 – 2002

Undercover Angels was a 2002 Australian reality show television series produced by the Seven Network which imitated the American Charlie's Angels series. It featured champion swimmer Ian Thorpe, who acted as the mentor to three women (Jackie O, Katie Underwood and Simone Kessell) who performed good deeds for people in need. The show premiered on 12 May 2002, and it was the fifth most watched television show in that week in Australia. Overall, it averaged 1.3 million viewers in its run of eleven episodes.

The three "angels" travelled in Alfa Romeos and performed deeds such as decorating a nursery for a young couple with newborn children, and finding a replacement puppy for children whose dog had been stolen.

The series was widely panned by media critics, with The Sydney Morning Herald television critic Ruth Ritchie declaring it "the worst show in the history of the world". Thorpe, however, did not mind the criticism, remarking that he was satisfied that the show was in the minority of reality shows in which good behaviour was rewarded.
