= Doug Frost (swimming coach) =

Australian swimming coach (born 1943)

Doug Frost (born 11 November 1943 in Orange, New South Wales) is an Australian swimming coach, best known as the coach of Ian Thorpe. He has been made an "Honor of Life Member" of the Australian Swim Coaches Association and of the Padstow Swim Club, New South Wales.

Frost was a coach on the Australian national teams for the 1995, 1997 and 1999 Pan Pacific Swimming Championships; the 1998 World Aquatics Championships and the 1998 Commonwealth Games teams and the 2000 Sydney Olympic Games team. He has been a director at the Australian Swim Coaches Association since 1989 and at the Doug Frost Swim School since 1978. After Thorpe changed coaches, Frost left the Padstow club to start afresh in Southport, Queensland. In May 2005, he was appointed the head coach of the swimming program at the Australian Institute of Sport.

In 2009 Frost was appointed head of the British Swimming ITC in Stirling, Scotland. In early 2011 he was released from the role due to continued difficult relations with several of his swimmers.

== See also ==
- List of Swimmers
- Swimming
