= John Davis (swimmer) =

New Zealand swimmer

Personal information
- Born: 30 June 1978 (age 48)
Medal record
Men's swimming
Representing New Zealand
Commonwealth Games
Bronze medal – third place	1998 Kuala Lumpur	4x200m freestyle

John Davis (born 30 June 1978) is a former New Zealand swimming representative. Alongside Trent Bray, Scott Cameron and Danyon Loader he was part of the bronze medal-winning 4 by 200 metre freestyle relay team at the 1998 Commonwealth Games.

== See also ==
- List of Commonwealth Games medallists in swimming (men)
