= Scott Cameron (swimmer) =

New Zealand swimmer (born 1976)

Personal information
- Full name: Scott Mark Cameron
- Born: 12 November 1976 (age 49) Dunedin, New Zealand

Sport
- Sport: Swimming
Medal record
Pan Pacific Championships
| Bronze medal – third place | 1997 Fukuoka | 4 × 200 m freestyle |
Commonwealth Games
| Bronze medal – third place | 1998 Kuala Lumpur | 4 × 200 m freestyle |

Scott Mark Cameron (born 12 November 1976) is an Olympic swimmer from New Zealand. He swam for New Zealand at the 1996 Olympics.

Alongside Trent Bray, John Davis and Danyon Loader he was part of the bronze medal-winning 4 × 200 m freestyle relay team at the 1998 Commonwealth Games. He trained under Duncan Laing at Moana Pool in Dunedin.

== See also ==
- List of Commonwealth Games medallists in swimming (men)
