= Manfred Thiesmann =

Manfred Thiesmann is a former German Olympic swimming coach of the 1970s, 1980s, 1990s and 2000s who was the head coach of the German swimming team at the 2000 Summer Olympics.
