= Uğur Taner =

Turkish swimmer (born 1974)

- Taner at right on guitar

Personal information
- Full name: Mehmet Uğur Taner
- National team: United States, 1993-2000
- Born: June 20, 1974 (age 52) Istanbul, Turkey

Sport
- Sport: Swimming
- Strokes: Butterfly, freestyle
- Club: Chinook Swimming Club; Greater Seattle, Washington
- College team: University of California, Berkeley
- Coach: Jack Ridley (Chinook Swimming Club); Nort Thornton (U. Cal Berkeley)
Medal record
Men's swimming
Representing the United States
World Championships (LC)
| Gold medal – first place | 1994 Rome | 4×100 m freestyle |
Pan Pacific Championships
| Gold medal – first place | 1993 Kobe | 4x200 m freestyle |
| Gold medal – first place | 1997 Fukuoka | 200 m butterfly |
| Gold medal – first place | 1997 Fukuoka | 4x200 m freestyle |
| Silver medal – second place | 1999 Sydney | 4x200 m freestyle |
| Bronze medal – third place | 1993 Kobe | 200 m freestyle |
| Bronze medal – third place | 1999 Sydney | 200 m butterfly |

Mehmet Uğur Taner (born June 20, 1974) is a retired Turkish-born American swimmer who was a High School All American, national public school record holder and Washington state champion specializing in sprint freestyle and butterfly. He competed for Turkey at the 1992 Barcelona Olympics in five events, won a gold medal for the U.S. team in the September, 1994 Rome World Championships in the 4x100-meter relay, and was an All American swimmer at the University of California Berkeley.

Taner was born in Istanbul, Turkey, in June 1974, the son of Erol and Gulcin Taner, who moved to the United States one year later, where Erol attended Indiana's Perdue University. The family later settled in Bellevue, Washington.

== High school and club swimming ==
Graduating in 1992, Taner attended and swam for Newport High School in Bellevue, Washington, and nearby Chinook Swim Club in Mercer Island, Washington, formerly Lake Washington Swim Club, where he excelled in swimming and was coached by ASCA Hall of Fame Coach Jack Ridley.

In 1990, Taner set high school state records in the 100 and 50-yard freestyle. As a high school junior in February 1991, he set state high school records in the 200-yard freestyle of 1:37.44 and in the 100-yard butterfly of 49.13. He also swam on winning 200- and 400-yard freestyle relay teams.

In July 1992, at 18, swimming as a high school senior at the AAA Swim Meet in May 1992, he set three national public high school records with a 20.02 in the 50-yard freestyle, a 48.14 in the 100-yard butterfly, and a 43.98 while swimming the first 100 yards of a 4x100 yard freestyle medley relay. Taner best remembered his record 20.02 time for the 50-yard freestyle as a high point in his high school career. During his four high school swimming seasons, Taner set records all four years and qualified to swim in nearly every event in the state high school championship meet.

=== Seven state championships ===
Taner was talented in multiple events and strokes, and his high school career included seven state championships as an individual competitor in a total of five events. Championships include his wins in the 50-yard freestyle in 1990, and 1992, the 100 freestyle in 1990, the 200 freestyle in 1991, the 100 butterfly in 1991–92, and the 200 individual medley in 1989.

His dual citizenship would have allowed him to attend the 1992 U.S. Olympic Swimming trials, but with the intense competition, he decided to swim for his native Turkey, where he had previously qualified.

== 1992 Barcelona Olympics ==
The summer after his senior year, at the age of 18, he swam for Turkey in the 1992 Summer Olympics in Barcelona. He did not make the finals in his entered events, but in the preliminaries he placed 27th in the 100-meter freestyle, 20th in the 200-meter freestyle with a 1:50.95, 23rd in the 400-meter freestyle, 24th in the 100-meter butterfly, and 23rd in the 200-meter butterfly.

== 1994 World Championship gold ==
Taner qualified to swim for the U.S. in the 1994 World Championships at the U.S. National Championships at the Indiana University Natatorium, on August 14–20, 1994, where he competed successfully in the 200-meter butterfly, and the 400- and 800-meter freestyle relays.

In what may be considered his highest-profile competition win, Taner was part of the gold medal team in the 4x100 meter freestyle relay at the World Championships in Rome in September 1994. Taner teamed with John Olsen, 1996 and 2000 Olympic medalist Josh Davis, and four-time Olympic medalist Gary Hall Jr. for a combined world championship record time of 3:16.90.

=== Pan Pacifics ===
Taner performed particularly well in Pan Pacific competition in freestyle, freestyle relay, and butterfly. He won a gold medal in the 1993 Kobe, Japan, Pan Pacifics in the 4x200-meter freestyle, and a bronze in the 200-meter freestyle. While continuing to train, four years later he won a gold in the 200-meter butterfly and the 4x200-meter freestyle in the 1997 Pan Pacifics in Fukuoka, Japan. He won a silver in the Sydney 1999 Pan Pacifics in the 4x200-meter freestyle and a bronze in the 200-meter butterfly.

== Swimming for UC Berkeley ==
Majoring in sociology, Taner attended classes and competed in swimming for the University of California, Berkeley, under Coach Nort Thornton. Most accomplished in butterfly, Taner took three consecutive NCAA titles in the 200 fly for Cal Berkeley from 1994 to 1996. A multi-event competitor in college as he was in high school, while swimming for Cal Berkeley at the March 26, 1994, NCAA Championships in Minneapolis, he took first place in the 200-yard butterfly with a 1:44.54.2, and tied for second in the 200-yard freestyle with a 1:34.69. He was on the U.S. national team from 1993 to 2000, where he won nine national individual titles and, as mentioned earlier, was a September 1994 Rome World Aquatics Champion in the 4 × 100 m freestyle relay.

=== First NCAA title since Biondi ===
As a sophomore at the University of California, Berkeley, in 1994, he was the first Cal swimmer since Matt Biondi to win an NCAA national title when he placed first in the 200-yard butterfly. His Berkeley coach told an interviewer that Taner had such versatility he could be entered in nearly any event and he'd succeed. Swimming for Chinook Swim School and Coach Jack Ridley on March 31, 1994, he took a third in the 100-meter freestyle with a 50.42, and a second in the 200-meter butterfly with a 1:59.77 at the U.S. Championships at Federal Way, Washington, outside Seattle. At Cal Berkeley, Taner was an NCAA champion in the 200 butterfly in multiple years. At the March 1995 NCAA Division I Championships in Indianapolis, swimming for California Berkeley, Taner won the 200 butterfly, one of his signature events, in 1:44.39. At the March 10, 1996, NCAA Championships in Austin, Texas, Taner again placed first in the 200 butterfly with a 1:43.22.

== Marriage and career ==
In October 2000, Taner married another internationally recognized swimmer from California, Liesl Kolbisen, who attended San Mateo High School, and graduated and swam for the University of Arizona in 1998, where she was an All-American. Before swimming for Arizona, Liesl had attended the University of the Pacific where like Ugur she excelled in sprint freestyle and butterfly, holding school records in the 50, 100, and 200 freestyle as well as the 100-yard butterfly. At the time, Taner worked as a professional speaker and represented Speedo Swimming gear and PowerBar. After their marriage, Taner worked at Liesl's family's swim school, La Petite Baleen. The school specialized in young swimmers and could teach basic swim skills to children as young as 2. Taner and Kolbisen have seven children together. A son, Brooks, was born in 2001; daughter Channing followed in 2003; son Vaughn in 2006; daughter Charis in 2008; son Grey in 2010; son Canaan in 2013; and daughter Sevilen in 2017.

Taner competed in the 1996 Olympic trials but did not qualify. In Tucson, Taner trained with the Hillenbrand Aquatic Club and attended the August 2000 Indianapolis Olympic trials. He failed to qualify in the 200 freestyle, finishing seventh with a 1:49.00, and also did not make the finals in the 200 butterfly, finishing tenth with a time of 2:01.03. Taner retired from competitive swimming not long after.

As of 2003, Taner was continuing to teach swimming at La Petite Baleen swim school in Half Moon Bay, California, about 30 minutes south of San Francisco, where he resides with his family. Since January 2006, Taner has been playing guitar with the Matt Nightingale Band as well as at numerous churches.
