= Masato Hirano (swimmer) =

Japanese swimmer (born 1975)

Personal information
- Born: June 11, 1975 (age 51) Kanagawa, Japan

Sport
- Sport: Swimming
Medal record
Representing Japan
Asian Games
Gold medal – first place	1998 Bangkok	1500m freestyle
Silver medal – second place	1994 Hiroshima	1500m freestyle
Silver medal – second place	1998 Bangkok	400m freestyle

Masato Hirano (平野 雅人, Hirano Masato; born June 11, 1975 in Kanagawa) is a former swimmer from Japan. He finished 6th in the 1500 metres freestyle competition at the 1996 Summer Olympics.
