= Chad Carvin =

American swimmer (born 1974)

Personal information
- Full name: Chad Robb Carvin
- National team: United States
- Born: April 13, 1974 (age 52) Laguna Hills, California, U.S.
- Height: 6 ft 2 in (188 cm)
- Weight: 185 lb (84 kg)

Sport
- Sport: Swimming
- Strokes: Freestyle
- College team: University of Arizona
Medal record
Men's swimming
Representing the United States
Olympic Games
| Silver medal – second place | 2000 Sydney | 4x200 m freestyle |
World Championships
| Bronze medal – third place | 2001 Fukuoka | 4x200 m freestyle |
SC Worlds
| Gold medal – first place | 2000 Athens | 400 m freestyle |
| Gold medal – first place | 2000 Athens | 4x200 m freestyle |
| Gold medal – first place | 2004 Indianapolis | 4x200 m freestyle |
| Silver medal – second place | 1997 Gothenburg | 400 m freestyle |
| Silver medal – second place | 2004 Indianapolis | 400 m freestyle |
| Bronze medal – third place | 2000 Athens | 200 m freestyle |
| Bronze medal – third place | 2000 Athens | 1500 m freestyle |
| Bronze medal – third place | 2002 Moscow | 400 m freestyle |
| Bronze medal – third place | 2002 Moscow | 4x200 m freestyle |
Pan Pacific Championships
| Gold medal – first place | 1997 Fukuoka | 4x200 m freestyle |
| Silver medal – second place | 1995 Atlanta | 4x200 m freestyle |
| Silver medal – second place | 1997 Fukuoka | 800 m freestyle |
| Silver medal – second place | 1999 Sydney | 4x200 m freestyle |
| Silver medal – second place | 2002 Yokohama | 4x200 m freestyle |
| Bronze medal – third place | 1993 Kobe | 400 m freestyle |
| Bronze medal – third place | 1993 Kobe | 800 m freestyle |
| Bronze medal – third place | 1995 Atlanta | 200 m freestyle |
| Bronze medal – third place | 1995 Atlanta | 400 m freestyle |
| Bronze medal – third place | 1997 Fukuoka | 400 m freestyle |
| Bronze medal – third place | 1997 Fukuoka | 1500 m freestyle |

Chad Robb Carvin (born April 13, 1974) is an American former competition swimmer and Sydney 2000 Olympic Silver medalist in the 4x200-meter freestyle relay. He was part of a team that set a world record in the 4x200 relay on March 17, 2000 in Athens, Greece.

== Career ==
=== University of Arizona ===
Carvin attended the University of Arizona, and swam for the Arizona Wildcats swimming and diving team in National Collegiate Athletic Association (NCAA) competition. He was the 1994 NCAA Champion in the 500-yard freestyle and 1650-yard freestyle in a span of only three days, setting American, US Open, and NCAA records.

Coming back from a diagnosis of cardiomyopathy in December 1995, Carvin won two national titles, the 400-meter IM in 4:21.77 and the 200-meter freestyle in 1:50.42 at the Phillips66 National Swimming Championships in Buffalo, New York on February 14, 1997.

=== 4x200 relay world record ===
On March 17, 2000, he was part of a 4x200 Meter Relay team that set a World Record of 7:01.33 in Athens, Greece. The record held until August 7, 2001.

=== 2000 Summer Olympics ===
At the 2000 Summer Olympics in Sydney, Australia, he earned a silver medal by swimming for the second-place U.S. team in the preliminary heats of the men's 4×200-meter freestyle relay. He also competed in the men's 400-meter freestyle, and finished sixth in the event final with a time of 3:47.58.

=== International competition ===
Carvin excelled in international competition. He won a bronze medal at the 2001 World Championships in the 4x200 free relay. Competing from 1997-2004 at the short-course World Championships, he captured nine medals, including three golds in 2000 in the 400 free in 2000 and 4x200. In 2004 World Championships, he took a gold in the 4x200 free relay. He was an 11-time medalist at the Pan Pacific Championships, including one gold in 1997 in the 4x200 free relay. He took two more medals at the 1993 Pan Pacs, three in 1995, four in 1997, and one in 1999 and 2002.

== Honors ==
In 1997, he was selected U.S. Swimmer of the Year. In 2013, he was inducted into the University of Arizona Sports Hall of Fame. At the time of his induction, Chad was still the holder of two University of Arizona swim records. One in the 500 yard freestyle and the other in the 400 yard individual medley.

== See also ==
- List of Olympic medalists in swimming (men)
- List of University of Arizona people
- List of World Aquatics Championships medalists in swimming (men)
- World record progression 4 × 200 metres freestyle relay
