= Jeremy Piasecki =

American Marine (born 1978)

- Born: September 28, 1978; New York City, New York, U.S.
- Military career
- Allegiance: United States
- Branch: United States Navy
- Unit: United States Marine Corps
- Conflicts: War in Afghanistan

Jeremy Piasecki is a United States Marine and most notable for being the first person to introduce water polo to Afghanistan.

== Early life ==
Piasecki is from California but he was born in New York in 1978. He went to Corona del Mar High School in Newport Beach, CA.

Piasecki owned ice cream shops in San Diego County and restaurant in Fallbrook, California for some time in the early 2000s.

== Playing career ==
=== Swimming ===
Piasecki swam for Irvine Novaquatics under coaches Dr. Dave Salo and Ken Lamont. He trained with Olympic gold medalists such as Jason Lezak, Amanda Beard, and Aaron Peirsol. While Piaseki swam at the high performance level, he succeeded in ocean competitions and extreme long distance rough water events in the mid-1990s. He left competitive swimming by entering the Marine Corps.

=== Water Polo ===
Piaseci played water polo for a club team in Newport Beach, CA, where they medaled and the national championships. He then played for Corona del Mar High School in that same city. He later played for Orange Coast College, near Newport Beach.

He then professionally played for a Bundesliga B team, Vfl Sindelfingen, during 2010–2014. He went on to finish his professional playing career for one year in Italy in 2015.

== Coaching career ==
Piasecki coached swimming and water polo in several countries at many different levels. He coached water polo at youth, high school, regional, international, professional and high performance levels, swimming at youth and international levels, and soccer at youth and semiprofessional levels.

=== United States ===
Piasecki started coaching with Irvine Novaquatics in the 1990s. He later coached swimming and water polo in Fallbrook, San Diego, California in the 2000s and took a water polo team to the national championships. He also coached at Temescal Canyon High School in Lake Elsinore. He was a coach and administrator for the Pacific Southwest Zone for USA Water Polo in the latter 2000s.

=== Afghanistan ===
Piasecki introduced the sport of "football in the water", "swimming football" or "water hand soccer" to Afghanistan in 2008. He found an empty pool in the countryside of Afghanistan, convinced the owner to fill it with water and then taught local townspeople to swim and play water polo. Many of the original players on this team died at the hands of the Taliban.

Shortly after introducing water polo to Afghanistan, he was summoned by the Afghanistan Olympic Committee and was asked to start national swim and water polo programs.

In 2010, Piasecki started another local team in Helmand Province, by the Iranian border. He found a pool there and again started to teach locals how to swim and later play water polo.

In 2016, Piasecki brought the Afghanistan team to their first international competition, put on by the international aquatics governing body (FINA) in Vietnam.

In addition to the hundreds of local teams that have been growing in Afghanistan and thousands of athletes, he developed the national team, disabled teams, and even a women's national team. His efforts have been chronicled in hundreds of international and United States publications, television and radio, ranging from Forbes, Reader's Digest, Los Angeles Times, Swimming World and USA Today to the Times of London.

=== Germany ===
Piasecki took over as VfL Sindelfingen's head water polo coach for their professional team in 2012 and created an additional youth program. He coached swimmers and water polo players there until 2014.

=== Italy ===
In 2014 to 2019, Piasecki coached water polo players and swimmers for several professional and youth Italian clubs and even helped an American military youth swim club.
