= Karen Burton =

American swimmer (born 1962)

Personal information
- Full name: Karen Burton
- National team: United States
- Born: June 11, 1962 (age 64) Eagle River, Wisconsin

Sport
- Sport: Swimming
- Strokes: Freestyle
- College team: U.S. Air Force Academy
Medal record
Women's swimming
Representing the United States
World Aquatics Championships
Bronze medal – third place	1991 Perth	25 km open water

Karen Burton (born June 11, 1962) is an American former competition swimmer who specialized in long-distance freestyle and open water events. While competing in the 25-kilometer open-water event, she represented the United States at the 1998 World Aquatics Championships in Perth, Western Australia, and took a bronze medal in the 1991 World Aquatics Championships. In Open Water championships sponsored by USA Swimming, she placed first in six national open water swimming champion competitions, which included three 15 km (9.3-mile) races and one 25 km (15.5-mile) race.

== Seal Beach, Rough Water win ==
In an early career competitive win at Seal Beach California, in the 1989 Seal Beach Rough Water Swim, she took first place among women in the 10-mile swim with a time of 3:14:44, finishing third overall. Burton easily won the woman's competition finishing nearly eighteen minutes ahead of second-place Martha Jahn.

== Bronze, World Aquatics Championships ==
As a highpoint of her career, she finished third in the 25-kilometer swim as part of the World Aquatics Championships on Swan River in Perth, Australia, on January 10, 1991, earning a bronze medal. Her time was 5 hours, 28 minutes, 22.4 seconds. Her teammate Martha Jahn took the Silver with a time only three minutes faster.

In the 1998 25-kilometer World Championships on January 11, 1998, in Perth, Australia, Burton finished tenth among the women competitors in a time of 5:56:40.

== Pan-Pacifics, third ==
In the Pan-Pacific 25-kilometer long distance championships in Sylvan Lake, Canada, in late August 1991, she finished third with the U.S. Team with a time of 6 hours, 6 minutes, 40 seconds.

== Waikiki Roughwater win ==
On her first attempt on September 7, 1992, she placed first among women competitors in the Waikiki Roughwater Swim on Oahu, Hawaii and was eighth overall. The 2.4 Mile Course stretching from Sans Sousi Beach to Duke Kahonamoku Beach in front of the Hilton Hawaiian Village, hosted a record 1,286 participants that year. At the age of 30, she finished 8th overall, in a non-record time of 55:57, despite a strong adverse current. In a close race, she edged the second-place women's finisher Shelly Taylor-Smith by a mere one second. Burton noted that "Shelly Taylor-Smith was ahead much of the race. I caught a wave coming into the beach finish and barely passed her".

== Lac St-Jean win ==
On July 11, 1992, she won a FINA World Cup race in Lac St-Jean in Quebec, Canada in 1992. Receiving the best time in the 25-kilometer swim of 6:20:2, she passed frequent rival Shelly Taylor-Smith of Australia at the mid-way point. With the water only 63F, the triangular course saw three and four foot waves and significant wind. Burton admitted, "I was getting very cold and started to feel tired", noting that her closest rival Shelly Taylor-Smith, who led the early race, was pulled for hypothermia.

== English Channel, 1993 ==
She crossed the English Channel in 9 hours 4 minutes in 1993. She retains an English Channel relay record with teammates Jay Wilkerson, Chad Hundeby, Martha Jahn, Dirk Bouma, and Sid Cassidy. She was coached by Penny Lee Dean and John York.

In 1993, she placed first among women in the 88 km Maratón Internacional Hernandarias – Parana in Argentina. Her winning time was 9 hours 41 minutes 42 seconds.

== Open Water 15K 1993 National Championship, win ==
In April 1993, she won the Fort Lauderdale US Swimming Open Water 15K National Championship with a time of 3:17:44. With the brisk, choppy ocean water, she lost her swim cap, goggles, and got her contact lenses wet, and still managed to outperform the competition. "You have to be adventurous to compete in something like this", she said. She had competed in the race in three prior years.

== Catalina Channel record, 1994 ==
She holds a record for women for crossing the Catalina Channel Santa Catalina Island to the mainland in 7 hours 43 minutes in 1994, which as of this publishing remains a top ten time. In an interview in 2020, she said she considered the swim one of her most notable accomplishments. She also completed a successful 32.3 km relay crossing of the channel in 9 hours 40 minutes as part of the Colorado Crew Relay team.

== World Pro Marathon Swim Federation Champion ==
In both 1996 and 1997, she became World Professional Marathon Swimming Federation champion.

== Atlantic City Ocean Marathon, second ==
In 1997, Burton placed second in the Atlantic City Ocean Marathon Swim. On Saturday, August 1, 1998, she came in tenth in the 22.5 mile Atlantic City Ocean Marathon Swim around Absecon Island in a time of 7:45:11, taking home a prize of $875. The race was one of her earliest competitions, and she placed seventh in 7:23:51, in August 1992.

== Life outside swimming ==
In 1999, as an Honour Swimmer she was inducted into the International Marathon Swimming Hall of Fame.

She was a graduate of the United States Air Force Academy where she earned a bachelor's degree in Human Factor Engineering. Outside of competition, for four years she was the USA Swimming Open Water Swimming Coordinator, and while in Colorado, helped organize open water swimming competitions. By 1992, she had attained the rank of an Air Force Captain, and was coach of the Air Force Academy's Women's swim team. She is the website manager for US Open Water Swimming.
