= Ron Turner (coach) =

American swimming coach

Ron Turner is a retired USA Swimming National Team coach based in Myrtle Beach S.C., USA. Turner was the head coach of the Jiangsu Swimming Team in Nanjing, China, where he was the coach for Chinese National Team members, including Olympic Gold medalist Zhang Yufei and Olympic Bronze Medalist Shi Jinglin.

Turner retired with 40 years coaching experience, having coached at numerous collegiate programs and nationally ranked club teams, including Indiana University (Bloomington), Greensboro Swim Association (Greensboro North Carolina), the YMCA of the Triangle Area Swim Team (Raleigh North Carolina), and Irvine Novaquatics (Irvine California).

Turner was the head assistant coach for the Hoosiers from 2001 to 2003, helping them achieve their first ever Women's Big Ten Championship Title. While head coach of the YMCA of the Triangle Area Swim Team in Raleigh, North Carolina, Turner led his team to a 2006 YMCA Combined National Championship title, producing a number of individual and relay national champions. Turner was named the 2006 National YMCA Coach of the Year, the North Carolina Coach of the Year in 2004, 2006, 2025 and was a 2018 inductee into the Florence Chick Fil-A Sports Hall of Fame.

Along with team championships, Turner coached a number of swimmers to the international level, having athletes at the 2007 World Championships in Melbourne, the 2011 World Championships in Shanghai, China, the 2016 Olympic Games in Rio de Janeiro, Brazil.

In 2006 Turner coached swimmer Charlie Houchin to the USA National Team. In 2012, Houchin qualified as a member of the USA Olympic Team, where he won a gold medal as a member of the Men's 800 meter freestyle relay. "

In 2025, Turner coached U.S. National Team member Kaidy Stout and U.S. National Junior Team Member Albert Smelzer as members of the Team USA World Junior Championships In Otepeni, Romania. At those Championships, Stout won the bronze medal in the Women's 200 Breastroke.

Turner is a 2025-26 USA National Team Coach. He served as assistant coach for the USA Women's team in the 2007 Pan American Games as well as a coach for the 2007 Indonesian World Championship Team.

Turner, originally from Florence, South Carolina, is a graduate of the University of Tennessee.
