= Gabe Woodward =

American swimmer (born 1979)

Personal information
- Full name: Gabriel Thomas Woodward
- Nickname: "Gabe"
- National team: United States
- Born: July 6, 1979 (age 47) Bakersfield, California, U.S.
- Occupations: Investment Counselor; Swim Coach
- Height: 6 ft 2 in (188 cm)
- Weight: 183 lb (83 kg)
- Spouse: Staci
- Children: 4

Sport
- Sport: Swimming
- Strokes: Freestyle
- Club: Canyon Aquatics Club, Valencia, CA; Irvine Novaquatics; Bakersfield Swim Club (BSC)
- College team: University of Southern California ('01)
- Coach: Mark Schubert (USC); Bruce Patmos (Canyon Aquatics); Dave Salo (Novaquatics); Keith Moore (Bakersfield SC)
Medal record
Men's swimming
Representing the United States
Olympic Games
Bronze medal – third place	2004 Athens	4x100 m freestyle
Pan American Games
Silver medal – second place	2007 Rio de Janeiro	4x100 m freestyle
Bronze medal – third place	2007 Rio de Janeiro	100 m freestyle
Summer Universiade
Bronze medal – third place	1999 Palma d Mallorca	4x100 m freestyle

Gabriel Thomas Woodward (born July 6, 1979) is an American former competition swimmer who competed for the University of Southern California, and won a bronze medal swimming for the United States in the 4x100 meter freestyle relay at the 2004 Athens Olympics.

== Early life and High School ==
Woodward was born July 6, 1979 in Bakersfield, California, to Thomas and Constance Woodward and attended Stockdale High School, graduating around 1997. Perhaps destined to select swimming as a sport, Gabe's father Tom was a former swimmer for USC and both of his brothers started swim training at an early age. Swimming for Stockdale High, Gabe was a Central Section titlist in both the 200 and 50 freestyle events in his Senior year, making him a qualifier for All American honors. Woodward won the 50-yard freestyle on May 17, 1997 at the Central Section Championships with a time of 20.88. At Stockdale High School, he was a Champion in the Central Section a total of three times, in his signature event, the 200-yard freestyle. In 1997, when he won the 50 freestyle event at the Central Section Championships in his Senior year, he became the first swimming competitor in Bakersfield in a ten year period to achieve a qualifying time that allowed him to attend the National meet.

== University of Southern California ==
USC Coach M. Schubert

Enrolling around the Fall of 1997, Woodward was a 2001 Graduate of the University of Southern California where he received a Bachelor of Arts Degree in Social Sciences, and trained and competed with USC's Men's swim team under Hall of Fame Coach Mark Schubert. While at USC, he earned NCAA All-American honors three times, and was a four-time recipient of All America honors. During his years as a collegiate student-athlete, Gabe was a medalist at the 1999 World University Games in the 4x100 free relay, and later would serve as the 2001 Team Co-Captain for the USC Trojans Swim Team.

After graduating USC in 2001, Woodward came to The Master's University in Santa Clarita, California to pursue a course of study in Biblical Counseling. While at Master's U., he trained under swim Coach Bruce Patmos at the nearby Canyons Aquatic Club in Valencia, and began to see improvement in his swimming. He experienced a noteworthy recovery from his collegiate injury of a pinched nerve in his shoulder. For a time in college, Woodward had very limited use of his arm and shoulder as a result of the injury. After training with Patmos, Woodward trained with the highly competitive Irvine Novaquatics Club by 2003 where he swam under Head Coach Dave Salo. Salo coached at Novaquatics from around 1990-2003. In May 2004, swimming for the Irvine Novaquatics, Woodward placed third in the 100 freestyle with a time of 50.55 at the Grand Challenge Invitational in Los Angeles. His training with Patmos and Salo led him to a sixth place finish in his event at the U.S. Olympic trials and a place on the 2004 U.S. Athens Olympic team.

== 2004 Athens Olympics ==
A high point in Woodward's competitive career came in 2004 at the Olympic Games in Athens, Greece as a member of the U.S. 4x100 Free Relay team that earned a Bronze Medal with a combined time of 3:13.17. South African lead off swimmer Roland Shoeman opened a lead that was never relinquished, and the Netherlands team placed second for the bronze, only one second behind the South Africans. Years later, he served as the U.S. Team Co-Captain at the 2007 Pan Am Games where he was a silver medalist in the 4x100 Free Relay and a bronze medalist in the 100 Freestyle.

Continuing to train after the 2004 Olympics, Woodward continued to be rated among the world's 50 best swimmers in both the 100 and 50-meter freestyle.

In 2006-7, Woodward trained with Keith Moore of the Bakersfield Swim Club in preparation for his bronze medal at the Pan American Games in Rio in the summer of 2007. Moore, who specialized in working with sprinters, also prepared Woodward for the 2008 Olympic trials. Moore had coached at the University of Nebraska as an Assistant Coach, and in 2007 would coach at Cal State Bakersfield.

=== 2008 Olympic trials ===
At the 2008 Olympic Trials, Woodward made the finals in the 100 Freestyle and the semifinals in the 50 Free event, but did not qualify for the U.S. Olympic team. In a close race, Woodward was only .13 seconds from qualifying the 100-meter Olympic trial. In 2010 at the US Championships, Gabe participated in the same two events.

Woodward and his wife Stacy have four children.

== Post-swimming careers ==
In 2005 Gabe began working in the field of Investment banking with his father, Thomas, at Bank of America, later working for Wells Fargo Private Bank in 2009. He started Woodward Diversified Capital, his own equity investment firm with his father Tom his brother Beau.

=== Coaching swimming ===
On February 21, 2017, The Master's University announced that Gabe would be joining them to launch their first-ever swimming and diving program for the Fall 2017 season. Woodward intended to make the Master's University program a member of the Pacific West Conference, a part of the NCAA Division I, II, III and NAIA institutions in the Southwestern United States. The team trained at the Santa Clarita Aquatic Center in the Valley of Santa Clarita. Woodward remained as a Coach at Masters through at least the 2022 season.

Woodward is the founder and an owner of the Bakersfield Swim Academy which he founded with his wife Staci in 2012 and also coaches Bakersfield Swim Club, in his hometown of Bakersfield. Woodward trained under Bakersfield Swim Club's Coach Keith Moore in preparation for the 2007 Pan American Games in Rio, and Moore also helped prepare him for the 2008 Olympic trials.

In his spare time, he has served the Kern County Cancer Foundation as President, and as a Deacon in his Church.

=== Honors ===
Woodward was inducted into the Kern County Sports Hall of Fame in 2012.

== See also ==
- List of Olympic medalists in swimming (men)
- List of University of Southern California people
- The Master's University Athletics
