= Konstantin Grigorishin =

Russian billionaire businessman (born 1965)

Konstantin Ivanovich Grigorishin
- Born: 16 November 1965 (age 60); Zaporizhzhia, Ukrainian SSR, USSR
- Citizenship: Russian, Ukrainian
- Education: Moscow Institute of Physics and Technology (PhD)
- Occupation: Businessman
- Children: 3

Konstantin Ivanovich Grigorishin (born 16 November 1965) is a Russian-Ukrainian businessman and billionaire. Business assets of Grigorishin, including energy, shipping and industrial machine-building companies, are mainly located in Ukraine. Grigorishin heads Energy Standard Group, which controls a number of enterprises in Zaporizhzhia and Ukrrichflot, as well as eight Ukrainian regional energy-distribution companies. He previously owned Sumy NPO, named after M.V. Frunze.

As of May, 2026, Ukraine is seeking an international arrest warrant for Grigorishin (Kostiantyn Hryhoryshyn), who is believed to be outside Ukraine.

== Biography ==
Grigorishin was born in Zaporizhzhia in a family of engineers-constructors of aviation engines who worked the whole life at elite Soviet construction bureau “Progress”. In 1982 graduated from physical-mathematics school №28 in Zaporizhzhia and was accepted to Moscow Physical-Technical Institute (MFTI). Studied first on physical and quantum electronics faculty and then in a theoretical group named after Landau on the faculty of general and applied physics with the quarters at the Institute of Theoretical Physics at Chernogolovka town.

Upon graduation from MFTI in 1988 started to work at theoretical department of the Institute of Spectrography of the Academy of Sciences of the USSR in the city of Troitsk where in 1991 he passed PH.D defense on the topic “Light propagation in nonlinear unordered environments”.

In 1992 started to do business, establishing together with a few other graduates of MFTI his first company “AragornSoft”, which was developing system solutions in the sphere of IT-technologies. Starting from 1993 “Tsentralnaya Optovaya Metallobaza” company, established by the same partners, engaged in trading of ferrous material and ferro-alloys, soon becoming one of the biggest metal traders in the territory of CIS.

In 1995, having divided the business with former partners, together with a new partner established “Sozidanie” firm.

From 1996 to 2000, during big privatization campaign in Ukraine, Konstantin Grigorishin invested in controlling and material shareholdings of a number of metallurgic, industrial machine building, transport-logistics and energy distribution (so-called oblenergo) companies. Business assets of Grigorishin, including in energy, industrial machine building and transport-logistics sectors, mainly located in the territory of Ukraine. Grigorishin is the majority investor in established by him in 2005 Energy Standard Group, which indirectly owns material or controlling shareholdings in a number of enterprises in Zaporizhzhia and a couple of Ukrainian regional energy-distribution companies (oblenergo).

In 2007, Energy Standard Group acquired controlling shareholding in “Ukrrichflot” company.

In 2015 Russian authorities accused Grigorishin of evading taxes worth 675 million rubles, which he denies, and a criminal case against him was opened. Shortly after Grigorishin permanently moved back to Ukraine. In April 2016, a Russian court issued an arrest warrant for Grigorishin in absentia. Meanwhile Grigorishin acquired Ukrainian citizenship.

On 15 March 2016 applied for Ukrainian citizenship on “the territorial origin” principle – on the grounds of birth or permanent domicile in Ukraine before August 24, 1991, and was granted Ukrainian citizenship in May of the same year.

On 1 November 2018, Konstantin Grigorishin became one of 322 individuals against whom the sanctions were imposed by the Decree of the Government of the Russian Federation.

== Assets ==
Grigorishin claimed in 2020 that 95% of his business is concentrated in Ukrainian assets. The main assets are in industrial machine-building, shipbuilding and energy distribution sectors [6] as well as transport-logistics company “Ukrrichflot”. In 2019, reports indicated that the ISL’s first edition was backed by an estimated US $20 million budget, financed by Grigorishin’s investment. His assets in Ukraine were blocked on 19 January 2025 by a decree of Ukrainian President Volodymyr Zelenskyy.

In energy distribution Grigorishin has controlling shareholdings in Luhansk and Vinnytsia regional energy distribution companies, the rest six oblenergo in question (Zaporizhzhia, Poltava, Sumy, Chernihiv, Cherkasy (30%) and Ternopil) are controlled together with other shareholders, amongst which is Ihor Kolomoyskyi (starting from 2010 Poltava, Sumy and Chernihiv oblenergo were managed jointly with Kolomoyskiy. According to “Ekonomicheskaya Pravda”, in spring 2016 preparation to divide assets has started, upon results of which Kolomoyskiy will obtain Poltava oblenergo). From the beginning of 2000th indirectly owns investments in majority shareholdings of “Zaporozhtransformator” (monopolist in production of Ukrainian power transformers and reactors) and “Zaporozhskiy Kabelniy Zavod”.

According to Arseniy Yatsenyuk, Prime Minister of Ukraine in 2014–2015, Grogorishin controls Ukrainian energy sector. On January 20, 2016 on the Cabinet of Ministers session Yatsenyuk officially applied to the Security Service of Ukraine with a request to investigate connection of Grigorishin to financing of anti-Ukrainian political forces (including the Communist Party of Ukraine) and his cooperation with FSB. Grigorishin himself actively criticized Yatsenyuk whom he treated very negatively.

On 15 March 2016 applied for Ukrainian citizenship. The grounds for this were mentioned birth or permanent domicile in Ukraine before August 24, 1991.

=== List of assets ===
As of autumn 2019, Grigorishin controlled:

- Vinnitsaoblenergo (50%)
- Zaporozhtransformator (100%)
- “Zaporozhskiy Kabelniy Zavod” (100%)
- Zaporozheoblenergo (in partnership with Ihor Kolomoyskiy, the latter has management control)
- Poltavaoblenergo (in partnership with Igor Kolomoyskiy, the latter has management control)
- Pidpryiemstvo “Kyiv”
- Sumyoblenergo (in partnership with Igor Kolomoyskiy, Grigorishin has management control)
- Ternopoloblenergo (in partnership with Kolomoyskiy, the latter has management control)
- UkrRichFlot (100%)
- Chernogovoblenergo (in partnership with Kolomoyskiy, Grigorishin has management control)

== Political connections ==
During election campaign for the 2002 Ukrainian parliamentary election the name of Konstantin Grigorishin was mentioned in connection with sponsorship of the political party and “Yabloko”. In the same time he was alleged to have financed the Social Democratic Party of Ukraine (united) (SDPU(o)). shareholding in “Ukrrichflot” company.

Grigorishin has also been considered as one of the sponsors of the 2004 Orange Revolution, although he denied it.

According to Grigorishin he has loaned $12 million to Arsen Avakov and Viktor Baloha, at the time both members of Our Ukraine–People's Self-Defense Bloc, to be used to finance their 2007 Ukrainian parliamentary election campaign.

In 2000th was named as one of key financiers of the Communist Party of Ukraine which he ceased to support in 2012. According to Grigorishin's own words, he supported the Communist Party of Ukraine because during the presidency of Viktor Yanukovych (2010-2014) "for political protection".

In 2014-2015 Konstantin Grogorishin actively criticized Prime Minister Arseniy Yatsenyuk whose work on said position he treated very negatively. In response, Arseniy Yatsenyuk on January 20, 2016 on the Cabinet of Minister's session accused Grigorishin of sabotage activities and work for foreign intelligence service.

On February 26, 2020 Pecherskiy District Court of Kyiv supported Konstantin Grigorishin's claim against the Cabinet of Ministers of Arseniy Yatsenyuk for defense of reputation and goodwill and refutation of false information. The Court ruled to refute false information spread by Yatsenyuk, which undermined reputation and goodwill of Grigorishin that “he is an example of those who steels funds from the budget and then finances anti-Ukrainian political forces and reports to FSB and is the agent of FSB”. The Court obliged former Prime Minister and the Cabinet of Ministers to refute circulated false information.

== Litigations ==
Konstantin Grigorishin, as all prominent businessmen of the end of 1990th – beginning of 2000th, suffered pressure from the side of political groups in power aimed to seize a share in his business. The main attacks here were done by Victor Pinchuk, the son-in-law of Leonid Kuchma, the President of Ukraine at the time being, by the group of Victor Medvedchuk – Ihor Surkis as well as by Ihor Kolomoyskyi.

During one of the attacks on his business in 2002, Grigorishin was arrested. That provocative act was discussed at the hearings in the House of Lords of the UK and covered in the speech of Viktor Yushenko, the leader of Ukrainian opposition at the time being, in Verkhovna Rada (the parliament of Ukraine). Grigorishin spent a week in detention and after then the charges were withdrawn. After being released, Grigorishin accused Surkis and Viktor Medvedchuk in organization of said provocative act. Being concerned about his and his family's safety, Grigorishin claimed he had to leave Ukraine and temporary moved to Moscow. According to Grigorishin's words, that all led to necessity, as a countermeasure to protect his business, to engage in politics and support opposition.

In December 2008 filed a claim to the High Court of Justice in London against Surkis and Valentin Zgurskiy, the shareholders of “Dynamo Kyiv” football club, regarding preemption right to buy 98% of shares in “Dynamo Kyiv” for 32 mln USD. According to Grigorishin, he was defrauded in 2004 when he was not allowed to exercise the right of preemption.

Under the court decision, Kolomoyskiy was ordered to pay Grigorishin 15 mln USD.

In 2008 the Security Service of Ukraine prohibited Grigorishin to enter the country for five years in connection with organization of “raider” (hostile takeover) attacks on Turboatom company. In June 2009, Kyiv Administrative Court of Appeal upheld the decision of the court of the first instance, which recognized the actions of the Security Service as unlawful.

In 2009 filed a lawsuit to invalidate the agreement on sale in 2006 of 61% shares in “UNTK” company, which controls broadcasting licence of Inter TV-channel. On 26 February the Commercial Court of Kyiv ordered to arrest the shares of the TV-channel and demanded the Ministry of Interior and General Prosecutor of Ukraine's Office to investigate the circumstances of death of Ihor Pluzhnikov, the former owner of the TV-channel, and subsequent sale of controlling block of shares in December 2009 to the companies of Valeriy Khoroshkovskyi. That lawsuit was treated as one of confrontation acts between Ukrainian Prime Minister Yulia Tymoshenko and businessman Dmytro Firtash.

On April 13, 2016 at the hearing at the Moscow City Court, the investigator announced that Konstantin Grigorishin had been put on the wanted list in connection with tax evasion case for 675 mln RUB. The prosecution believes that Grigorishin together with his partner have not paid taxes for 675 934 000 RUB, and, therefore, inflicted damage to the state budget in the same amount.

On May 9, 2016, the London Court of International Arbitration decided in favor of Vadim Novinskiy and Vladimir Lukyanenko, minority shareholders of Sumy NPO named after M.V. Frunze, against the majority shareholder, Konstantin Grigorishin. According to arbitration award, Grigorishin had breached shareholders’ agreement and, therefore, is obliged to pay the plaintiffs more than 300 mln USD. Until the end of 2018 the arbitration decision was not abided, in summer 2019 Grigorishin and Lukyanenko signed the settlement agreement, under which the debt was satisfied by transfer of 29% shares in Kharkivoblenergo and Kharkivenergosbut as well as of the controlling shareholding (more than 50%+1 share) in Sumy NPO named after M.V. Frunze. In December 2019, the deal was closed.

In August 2016 some Khasan Ediev (native-born of Dzhalka village of Gudermes district of Chechnya, whose monthly income according to filed tax returns varied from 20 to 100 thousand RUB) filed a claim to the District Court of Gudermes against Konstantin Grigorishin for repayment of principal debt, accrued interest and sanctions under the loan agreement.

It went about 110 mln USD in cash in hand which Khasan Ediev allegedly provided to Konstantin Grigorishin, and which the latter has not returned. On 10 November 2016, the District Court of Gudermes awarded Grigorishin to pay 230 mln USD. Subsequently, in October 2017 this decision was upheld by the order of the High Court of Chechen Republic, after which enforcement proceedings were commenced. In December 2017, bailiffs accompanied by the representatives of Khasan Ediev arrived at apartments and house in Moscow owned by Konstantin Grigorishin with the aim to organize eviction of said real estate and movable property located there. Moreover, the bailiffs subsequently arrested that real estate, already arrested in course of criminal case against Grigorishin.

== Wealth ==
In 2012 “Forbes” magazine estimated Grigorishin's wealth at US$1.2 billion, in 2011 – at US$1.3 billion, in 2013 – at US$1.814 billion.

In its turn, Ukrainian magazine “Focus” in 2012 estimated total value of assets owned by Grigorishin at US$2.019 billion (7th place in the list of wealthiest Ukrainians), in 2015 – at US$920 million (6th place).

== Interests ==
Since 1993, Konstantin Grigorishin is engaged in art collection, since 2004 on permanent basis his art collection is managed by Olga Vaschilina. By 2012, he owned 238 oil on canvas paintings and about 500 pages of graphics. Today part of his Russian collection is seized by the court.

Main sport activity of Grigorishin is swimming, where he qualified as a master at international class. In 2012, he established the Energy Standard Swim Club, where he holds the position of President. In 2013, Energy Standard Group became a sponsor of Ukrainian Swimming Federation and created prize money fund for the swimmers for upcoming World Cup. In 2018, established International Swimming League, in the first season of which world's top-tier swimmers competed in eight teams (four European and four North American). Grigorishin has stated that one of the ISL’s core goals is “putting power back into the hands of the athletes.” He also explained that the league enforces a strict anti-doping policy, under which swimmers with prior doping suspensions are not permitted to compete. Over a decade before launching the International Swimming League (ISL), Grigorishin had already been personally involved in swimming, reportedly organising training camps and competitions. He later formalised this involvement by establishing the Energy Standard Swim Club, where he serves as president. In January 2026, the International Swimming League won a U.S. jury verdict in its antitrust litigation against World Aquatics (formerly known as FINA).

In June 2010, Grigorishin became an investor for upcoming season for “PFC Sumy” football club at the time playing in the Ukrainian Second League and paid up club's debts of ₴640 thousand. In February 2011, “Yuvileiny Stadium” in Sumy was purchased for ₴10 million where the club was based.

In 2020, acted as organizer for International Institute of Political Philosophy.

== Personal life, education ==
Married (wife – Natalia Yakos), has three children – daughter Evgenia (born 1988), son Ivan (born 1998), son Georgiy (born 2010).

Citizen of Cyprus, the Russian Federation and Ukraine (from 2016) Cyprus citizenship revoked (2 Jul 2024)

Grigorishin was married to Oksana Grigorishina, with three children and his residence was Moscow, Russia. After Grigorishin gained Ukrainian citizenship in 2016 he resides in Kyiv, Ukraine. He is currently divorced. Grigorishin has a son and a daughter. His son Ivan played six times for the California Golden Bears, the team of the University of California, Berkeley.

2017, it was reported in The Guardian that Grigorishin had acquired Cypriot citizenship in 2010 through a "Golden visa" scheme.
