= Chad Hundeby =

American swimmer (died 2021)

Chad M. Hundeby
- Hundeby during his swimming career

Personal information
- Born: February 15, 1971 Irvine, California, U.S.
- Died: June 12, 2021 (aged 50) California, U.S.
- Occupations: Pro distance competitor Kindergarten teacher
- Spouse: Jean Marie
- Children: 3 sons

Sport
- Sport: Swimming
- Events: English Channel '94 (7 hrs 17 mins World Record); Catalina Channel '93 (8 hrs 14 mins World Record)
- Strokes: freestyle distance
- Club: Irvine Novaquatics
- College team: Southern Methodist University
- Coach: Pat Bangs (Woodbridge High); Phillip Darr (Novaquatics); Eddie Sinnott (SMU); Penny Dean (English Channel)
Medal record
Representing United States
World Championships
| Gold medal – first place | 1991 Perth | 25km Open Water |

Chad Hundeby (February 15, 1971 – June 12, 2021) was an American long-distance swimmer, who competed for Southern Methodist University, and set a world record on September 27, 1994, for the fastest swim of the English Channel of 7 hours, 7 minutes that held for 21 years. On September 24, 1993, he set a record for crossing the Catalina Channel with a time of 8 hours, 14 minutes, 46 seconds. A highly accomplished open water competitor in a large array of international swims, he was made a member of the International Swimming Hall of Fame in 2012.

== Early life and swimming ==
Hundeby was born February 15, 1971, to parents Ted and Jan Hundeby in greater Irvine, California. Getting an early start, he learned to swim at age 3 and began competing at five as a member of the Blue Buoy Swim School based in nearby Tustin, California, where he was coached by John Johnson. Competing in multiple strokes, but focusing on freestyle distance as a boy in the summer of 1983, he trained and competed for Nova Swim Club, later known as Irvine Novaquatics, currently in Fountain Valley in Greater Irvine.

By 1986, he attended Woodbridge High School where he trained and competed under coaches Pat Bangs and Dan Gaines, and graduated in 1989. Gaines began coaching at Woodbridge around 1986, and led the boys’ team to notable success during his first five years. During his high school years, Hundeby also trained under Ralph Phillip “Flip” Darr and competed for Irvine Novaquatics, a highly competitive swim club. He joined the senior team by the age of 12 and represented Novaquatics at an international meet in Japan in June 1987. Darr, who was inducted into the International Swimming Hall of Fame in 2006, founded Irvine Novaquatics and coached numerous Olympic athletes.

=== Woodbridge High ===
A standout as a High School swimmer for Woodbridge, in the late 1980s Hundeby captured six individual titles in the CIF Southern Section Conference, consisting of three titles in the 200-yard freestyle and three in the 500-yard freestyle. A State Champion as a Senior in 1989, he led the Woodbridge warriors to the CIF Division 2AA title. As a High School Senior at the 1989 CIF Division 2AA championship, his 200 freestyle time of 1:38.45 and 500 freestyle time of 4:25.9 won the events and the team title and were among the fastest in all the California Interscholastic Federation (CIF) divisions. He also won the 200 and 500 in the 1988 2A Southern Section Division championships.

Already showing strength in longer distance events, in March 1989, at the U.S. Short Course National Championships, he won the 1000-meter freestyle in a time of 9:01.53. Particularly dominant competing against high school athletes, during his High School Senior year he was undefeated in dual meets swimming for Woodbridge High. Not unfamiliar with open water swimming in his early career, from 1983 to 1988, despite often training six days a week in the pool, Hundeby would do a long open water ocean swim twice a year of up to three miles, and would do shorter swims with greater frequency.

=== Olympic trials ===
At the August 1988 Olympic trials in Austin, Texas, Hundeby finished 15th in the 400-meter freesyle with a time of 3:57.91, and was not one of the top eight finishers required to make the finals. The somewhat disappointing finish may have motivated him to focus on longer distance events as he would at SMU, and eventually focus on open water swimming.

At the 1992 Olympic trials in Indianapolis, Hundeby placed 18th in the 1500 freestyle with a time of 16:01.23, a quality time, but he was not among the top eight required to make the final round. Hundeby was still selected to train with the U.S. Olympic Distance team in April, 1992, that June in Honolulu.

=== Southern Methodist University ===
In the Fall of 1989, he attended Southern Methodist University in Dallas, Texas, on a swimming scholarship where he swam under Coach Eddie Sinnott, a former SMU swim team standout. He was recruited for the 1988–89 season by Head Coach Greg Rhodenbaugh, who was ending his Head Coaching career. At SMU, Hundeby received honors as an All-American in 1990, 1991 and 1993. As of June 2021, as a standout distance swimmer, Hundeby still held the SMU school record in the 1,000-free freestyle of 9:07.85 and the 1,650 freestyle of 15:05.83.

== Distance swimming highlights ==
In his best-known feat in international competition, in 1991 Hundeby won a gold medal in the men's 25 kilometres open water swimming event at the 1991 World Aquatics Championships, competing on the Swan River in Perth, Australia.

An exceptional professional competitor, on August 1, 1993, he won Canada's 32 km Traversee Internationale du lac St-Jean in 9 hours 19 seconds, and two weeks later on August 14, he won Atlantic City's 37 km Around The Island Swim with a time of 7 hours 13 minutes 32 seconds. In his early career, He won Seal Beach, California's 10-mile 1989 Seal Beach Rough Water Swim. In both 1994 with a time of 5 hrs 45 minutes, and in 1995 with a time of 6 hours, 7 minutes, 19 seconds he completed the 25 km St. Vincent's Foundation Swim Across the Sound, from Long Island, New York, to Bridgeport, Connecticut, where the swim is based.

== Channel world records ==
On September 27, 1994, he set the standing world record for the fastest swim of the English Channel from Dover, England to Cap Gris Nez, France, in a Men's record time of 7 h 17 mins. He was coached by former Channel Swimmer Penny Lee Dean, and eclipsed her women's record by twenty-three minutes. The previous record had stood since 1978, when Penny Lee Dean completed the swim in 7 h 40 mins. As a tribute to his achievement, Hundeby's record stood for 21 years.

In addition to professional marathon racing, at the age of 23, on September 24, 1993, he was credited with crossing the Catalina Channel with a world record time of 8 hours 14 minutes and 46 seconds.

He later worked as a teacher and taught kindergarten in Placentia, California at Melrose Elementary.

=== Honors ===
As a High School junior in 1988, he was Los Angeles Times's Boy Swimmer of the Year. During his college years and beyond, the USA Open Water Swimming Committee presented Hundeby the Open Water Swimmer of the Year for each of the years 1991, 1993 and 1994. He became a member of the International Swimming Hall of Fame in 2012, and is a member of the International Marathon Swimming Hall of Fame in 1996.

Hundeby died unexpectedly on June 12, 2021, of a heart attack at the age of 50. He was survived by his wife, Jean Marie, three sons, and a brother. His son Anders was a swimmer for Tustin High School.
