= Swimming at the 2007 Pan American Games – Men's 100 metre freestyle =

The Men's 100m Freestyle event at the 2007 Pan American Games occurred at the Maria Lenk Aquatic Park in Rio de Janeiro, Brazil on July 16 (evening; prelims), July 17 (morning; semifinals) and July 18 (evening; finals). A total of 20 swimmer were entered in the event.

== Medalists ==
Gold	César Cielo; Brazil
Silver	José Meolans; Argentina
Bronze	Gabe Woodward; United States

== Records ==
Record	Athlete	Time	Date	Venue
World Record	Pieter van den Hoogenband (NED)	47.84	2000-09-19	(Australia) Sydney
Pan Am Record	Fernando Scherer (BRA)	49.19	1999-08-04	(Canada) Winnipeg

== Results ==
Rank	Swimmer	Heats		Semifinals		Final
Rank	Swimmer	Time	Rank	Time	Rank	Time
1	César Cielo (BRA)	49.95	3	49.37	1	48.79
2	José Meolans (ARG)	50.22	6	49.62	4	49.42
3	Gabe Woodward (USA)	49.50	1	49.48	2	49.59
4	Eduardo Deboni (BRA)	50.09	4	50.01	7	49.95
5	Shaune Fraser (CAY)	50.41	7	49.96	6	49.99
6	Dale Rogers (USA)	49.81	2	49.67	5	50.11
7	George Bovell (TRI)	50.10	5	49.51	3	50.16
8	Albert Subirats (VEN)	50.44	8	50.18	8	52.10
9	Chad Hankewich (CAN)	50.69	9	50.20		
10	Martin Kutscher (URU)	50.79	10	50.51		
11	Luis Rojas (VEN)	51.16	11	51.09		
12	Paul Kutscher (URU)	51.48	13	51.20		
13	Richard Hortness (CAN)	51.33	12	51.22		
14	Terrence Haynes (BAR)	51.91	15	51.59		
15	Juan Yeh (MEX)	51.62	14	51.66		
16	Maximiliano Schnettler (CHI)	52.11	16	52.29		
17	Jeremy Knowles (BAH)	52.12				
18	Josh Laban (ISV)	52.21				
19	Roy Burch (BER)	53.12				
20	Matias Aguilera (ARG)	53.17				
