= Colleen Lanne =

American swimmer (born 1979)

Colleen Lanné
Personal information
- Full name: Colleen Anne Lanné
- National team: United States
- Born: August 18, 1979 (age 46) Tucson, Arizona, U.S.
- Height: 5 ft 10.5 in (1.791 m)
- Weight: 145 lb (66 kg)

Sport
- Sport: Swimming
- Strokes: Freestyle
- Club: La Paloma; Novaquatics
- College team: Texas Longhorns
- Coach: Eddie Reese (UT) (Dave Salo) Novaquatics
Medal record
Women's swimming
Representing the United States
Olympic Games
Silver medal – second place	2004 Athens	4×100 m freestyle
World Championships (LC)
Silver medal – second place	2001 Fukuoka	4×100 m freestyle
World Championships (SC)
Silver medal – second place	2002 Moscow	4×200 m freestyle
Pan American Games
Gold medal – first place	2003 Santo Domingo	4×100 m freestyle
Gold medal – first place	2003 Santo Domingo	4×200 m freestyle
Silver medal – second place	2003 Santo Domingo	200 m freestyle

Colleen Anne Lanné (Note: Colleen's last name is spelled Lanne' or Lanné, though she went by the former in meets (with the apostrophe rather than the accented "e") due to a systemic problem which prevented the "é" character's use.) (born August 18, 1979), also known by her married name as Colleen Lanne Cox, is an American former competition swimmer for the University of Texas who represented the United States in the Olympics, FINA world championships and Pan American Games. She competed internationally in freestyle swimming events.

Colleen Lanné was born in Tucson, Arizona, on August 18, 1979. Colleen started swimming around the age of eight in the summer of 1987 to occupy her time, and continued summer training to gain an edge. Beginning young, she started competing in stroke competition by the summer of 1990 at the age of 10 with the Tucson area's La Paloma Club team, but began training in earnest with the Hildenbrand Aquatic team. The Hildenbrand Team trained at the University of Arizona Hilldenbrand Aquatics Center, a premier facility. One of her first major tournaments was in August 1994 when she swam in the Phillips 66 National Swimming Championship in Indianapolis after recording a qualifying time of 23.9 in the 50 yard freestyle.

== Salapointe Catholic High ==
She swam for the Salpointe Catholic High School girls' swim team, and graduated Salpointe High in 1997. In October 1993, the Salpointe Catholic girls placed second at the Xavier Invitational Meet but won the overall team title in combination with the boys' team. As a Sophomore at Salpointe in 1994, Lanné won the 5A State 50 freestyle event becoming a state champion, and finished second in both the 100 freestyle and 200 relay, helping lead the Salpointe Catholic girls to a team championship at state that year, and placing her on the Tucson Citizen's All Star Team for the second straight year. As a Senior at Salpointe Catholic in November 1996, Colleen placed second in the 50 freestyle and fourth in the 100 freestyle at the Arizona State Championship after winning both events at the 5A Southern Regional championship meet. In her career with Salpointe Catholic where she graduated in 1997, Lanne won a total of six state titles.

== University of Texas ==
Lanné attended the University of Texas at Austin on scholarship from around 1998–2002, under Coach Eddie Reese where she swam for the Texas Longhorns swimming and diving team. Upon graduation, she received a bachelor's degree in public relations from Texas in 2002. As one of Texas's top freestyle sprinters, she was an NCAA Champion four times, received All-American honors 22 times, and was both a 2000 and 2001 Big 12 Conference Swimmer of the Year. She led Texas to Big 12 Conference team titles three times. In 2002, she held both the American and U.S. Open record in the 100-meter freestyle.

In 2002, Lanne' was a silver medalist in the 4×200-meter freestyle relay at the Short Course World Championships. She won a silver in the 200-meter freestyle, as well as gold medals in the 4×100-meter and 4×200-meter freestyle relays at the 2003 Pan American Games.

== 2004 Olympic silver medal ==
While training for the 2004 Olympics, Lanné moved to Orange County and swam with the Irvine Novaquatics where she was managed by outstanding Coach Dave Salo, formerly with University of Southern California. She supported herself during her Olympic training with an endorsement from Speedo. Prior to the Olympic Trials, her best time in the 100-meter had been 55.20. In Long Beach, California, on July 12, 2004, Lanné qualified for the 2004 U.S. Olympic team in the 4×100-meter freestyle relay after finishing sixth in the 100-meter freestyle with a time of 55.40, edging out former Olympian Lindsay Benko who swam a 55.63. Olympian Kara Lynn Joyce won the trial with a 54.38.

She earned a silver medal at the 2004 Summer Olympics in Athens, by swimming for the second-place U.S. team in the preliminary heats of the women's 4×100-meter freestyle relay. The U.S. 4x100 relay team finished the finals with a time of 3:36.39, around 1.54 seconds after the Australian team that took the gold, Lanne did not swim in the final heat.

== Honors ==
Colleen Lanne Cox was a 2014 inductee into the University of Texas Sports Hall of Fame. She lives in Austin with two children.

== See also ==
- List of Olympic medalists in swimming (women)
- List of University of Texas at Austin alumni
- List of World Aquatics Championships medalists in swimming (women)
