= College Swimming League =

American collegiate swimming league

- Sport: Swimming
- Founded: 2025
- First season: September 2026
- CEO: Robert Kent
- COO: Kyle Sockwell
- Country: United States
- Level on pyramid: NCAA Division I
- Website: https://collegeswimmingleague.com/

The College Swimming League (CSL) is a collegiate swimming league in the United States founded by Robert Kent and Kyle Sockwell, with support from the International Swimming League (ISL). Its first season, in 2026, has 12 NCAA Division I programs competing in four-team matches. The league announced a multi-year media rights agreement with ESPN on July 8, 2026.

== History ==
The College Swimming League was announced in December 2025 by Robert Kent and Kyle Sockwell. Kent previously competed collegiately for the University of Toronto and was general manager of the Toronto Titans in the ISL. Sockwell competed for Arizona State University and has worked in swimming media.

The league was announced as a collegiate competition operating alongside existing NCAA swimming competitions. Participation was initially limited to selected programs.

The ISL backed the CSL, which adopted parts of the ISL competition format for its collegiate matches.

The CSL began announcing its founding member programs in May 2026. Virginia, Georgia, Auburn, Michigan, NC State and Alabama were among the first announced. Ohio State, Stanford, California and Louisville followed, with Indiana and Tennessee completing the 12-team field in early June.

On July 8, 2026, the CSL announced a multi-year media rights agreement with ESPN. Under the agreement, ESPN became the exclusive broadcaster of CSL competition in the United States and Canada. The six regular-season matches are to stream on ESPN+, while the Wild Card and Championship are scheduled for ESPNU.

ESPN holds the CSL's media rights in the United States and Canada. The six regular-season matches are scheduled to stream on ESPN+, while the Wild Card and Championship are scheduled to air on ESPNU. One regular-season match is also scheduled for the SEC Network.

Outside the United States and Canada, the league has a separate media rights agreement with DAZN.

On November 7, 2026, CSL CEO Robert Kent confirmed that the league will return for a second season.

== Format ==
A CSL match has four teams competing in a single session. Men's and women's results are combined to produce one team score.

Races are held in short-course yards. The program includes Skins and Super Skins events. Skins consist of individual 50-yard elimination races, while Super Skins are elimination relay events based on the 200-yard medley relay. Both events were adapted from the ISL format.

CSL matches count toward NCAA dual-meet requirements, and performances from the matches can be used for NCAA championship qualification.

Six regular-season matches are followed by a Wild Card match and the Championship. The top three teams after the regular season qualify directly for the Championship. Teams placed fourth through seventh compete in the Wild Card for the remaining Championship place.

== Teams ==
The 2026 CSL field consists of 12 NCAA Division I programs from the Atlantic Coast Conference, Southeastern Conference and Big Ten Conference. California, Louisville, NC State, Stanford and Virginia are the five ACC programs in the league.

2026 College Swimming League teams
Program	Conference
University of Alabama	SEC
Auburn University	SEC
California	ACC
University of Georgia	SEC
Indiana	Big Ten
University of Louisville	ACC
University of Michigan	Big Ten
NC State	ACC
Ohio State University	Big Ten
Stanford University	ACC
University of Tennessee	SEC
Virginia	ACC

== 2026 season ==
The first CSL season has six regular-season matches, followed by the Wild Card and Championship. Each of the 12 teams is scheduled to compete in two regular-season matches. NC State won the inaugural league championship with 519.5 points in the final match followed by Tennessee (469 points), Virginia (449.5 points) and Indiana (282 points).

2026 CSL schedule
Match	Date	Teams	Venue	Results
1	September 24	Indiana, Louisville, Ohio State, Michigan	FMC Natatorium, Westmont, Illinois	Indiana 586.5 Louisville 453.5 Michigan 424.5 Ohio State 253.5
2	September 25	Georgia, Alabama, NC State, Virginia	FMC Natatorium, Westmont, Illinois	Virginia 666; NC State 554.5; Alabama 263; Georgia 207.5
3	October 2	California, Stanford, Auburn, Ohio State	Avery Aquatic Center, Stanford, California	Stanford 550 California 543.5 Auburn 371.5 Ohio State 255
4	October 9	Tennessee, Louisville, Michigan, Virginia	Allan Jones Aquatic Center, Knoxville, Tennessee	Virginia 567 Tennessee 535 Louisville 315.5 Michigan 302.5
5	October 16	Indiana, California, Stanford, NC State	Mt. SAC Aquatic Center, Walnut, California	NC State 544.83 Indiana 469.83 California 394.33 Stanford 311
6	October 23	Auburn, Alabama, Georgia, Tennessee	Gabrielsen Natatorium, Athens, Georgia	Tennessee 668 Alabama 382.5 Georgia 353 Auburn 316.5
7 (Wild Card)	November 5	California, Indiana, Louisville, Stanford	IU Natatorium, Indianapolis, Indiana	Indiana 592 Louisville 456 Stanford 357.5 California 314.5
8 (Championship)	November 6	Indiana, NC State, Tennessee, Virginia	IU Natatorium, Indianapolis, Indiana	NC State 519.5 Tennessee 469 Virginia 449.5 Indiana 282
