= International Swimming League =

Professional swimming league (2019–2021)

- Sport: Swimming
- Founded: 2019
- CEO: Konstantin Koudriaev
- President: Konstantin Grigorishin
- No. of teams: 10
- Countries: Worldwide
- Website: https://isl.global/

The International Swimming League (ISL) was an annual professional swimming league, established in 2019. It features a team-based competition format with fast-paced race sessions. In 2019, the regular season started in October and the Final Match was held in December. Coverage in 2019 reported that the ISL operated with a US$20 million budget for its inaugural season, including US$7 million allocated for athlete and team prize money. Financed by Konstantin Grigorishin, the league expressed an aim of “putting power back into the hands of the athletes.” It also enforced a strict anti-doping policy under which athletes with prior doping suspensions were banned from competition.

After suspending operations following the 2021 season, the league announced plans in December 2025 to target a relaunch as early as 2026 under a revised commercial model.

== History ==
=== FINA-ISL dispute ===
At the start of the 2018 season, the only major annual swimming tournament sanctioned by FINA was FINA Swimming World Cup. International Swimming League, a team-based professional swimming series, was founded in 2017 by Russian-Ukrainian billionaire Konstantin Grigorishin. ISL planned to hold an inaugural event in Turin, Italy, in December, 2018. In June, 2018, FINA sent a letter to all 209 federations, urging them not to cooperate with ISL.

After clarifying the interpretation of a rule included in section 4.5 of FINA general rules, FINA stated that the Energy for Swim meet was now classified as an international event for that season, given that "a competition which is conceptually designed to have a majority of foreign participants is not a national competition", and thus it needed to be approved within the ordinary six-month window.

Since the approval window was already expired, the athletes participating in that meet would have been disqualified from one to two years by FINA and any world records set during the event would not have been recognized.

The negotiations between the parties officially broke down on 15 November 2018 after athletes decided that it would not be worth swimming at FINA sectioned meets if FINA was barring athletes from competing in the ISL. Eventually leading to Energy for Swim meet cancellation.

In January 2026, a jury in the United States found in favor of the International Swimming League in its antitrust case against World Aquatics (formerly known as FINA).

=== Debut ===
Despite negotiations failure between FINA, ISL and Energy Standard Group – that would have organized Energy for Swim meet along with FIN – several athletes sustained the new idea of a team-based swimming competition (among which Katinka Hosszú and Adam Peaty). FINA announced in December 2018 the creation of a brand new league, called FINA Champions Swim Series. The first ISL team to be officially announced was German side ONEFlow Aquatics (which would not have taken part to the inaugural season, eventually) in January 2019, after which ISL announced also the remaining three European teams and the four American teams in the following months.
Meanwhile, ISL also presented a newly formed representation company – ISL USA – which would have staged the semi-finals and Final Match, at Mandalay Bay in Las Vegas, and assisted the new US clubs in their operations (including scouting talent, signing athletes and running their own swimming meets). A crucial step towards the creation of ISL was made when FINA announced that athletes taking part in Non-FINA sanctioned events would not have been banned and that similar competitions would be allowed, also confirming that all the world records set in the first two stages would not have been considered (because of clashing with World Cup events).
In June 2019, ISL released the schedule of the league inaugural season, which officially started on the first week of the following October.

=== Athlete bans ===
From the beginning of the International Swimming League, the administrators established a policy of not allowing athletes with anti-doping rules violations or ethics violations to compete. For athlete bans due to anti-doping rules violations, the ISL relies on test results from the World Anti-Doping Agency to implement the bans. In March 2022, the ISL approved the ban of all Russian swimmers and staff from the Energy Standard swim club as a way of punishing Russians in response to the 2022 Russian invasion of Ukraine and demonstrating its support for Ukraine.

=== Non-payment boycotts ===
In October 2021, following the repeated non-payment of multiple contractors, staff, and athletes, a number of athletes proposed boycotting the 2021 ISL playoffs. Leading up to the 2021 playoffs, the League's breaking of their contractual obligation to pay their workers and performers dated back at least to the 2020 ISL season, where multiple athletes were not paid for the entire season. In addition to non-payment of athletes and other workers, the ISL had already established a history of non-payment with competition venues, suppliers, and vendors across various locations, including the United Kingdom, Switzerland, and Hungary, that dated back to season one in 2019.

=== Invasion of Ukraine and cancellation ===
With the vast majority of the ISL's $20 million annual funding coming from Ukrainian billionaire and businessman Konstantin Grigorishin, the 2022 Russian invasion of Ukraine has caused the league to struggle even further in its finances. On 28 February, just days after the Russian invasion began, the ISL failed to pay its athletes due to being unable to remove funds from within Ukraine. On 27 March 2022, the ISL released a statement with the decision to cancel its 4th season of 2022, slated to start in July with a planned 24 competitions and $13 million prize pool for athletes. The statement makes no mention of funding, though explicitly states support for the Ukrainian effort.

=== College Swimming League ===
In December 2025, the International Swimming League (ISL) backed the establishment of the College Swimming League (CSL), a new team-based collegiate competition in the United States that adopts an ISL-style match format. The CSL is scheduled to begin in the fall of 2026 with NCAA programs competing in head-to-head meets, and is intended to increase the commercial visibility of college swimming while creating a potential pathway toward professional competition.

=== Relaunch planning (2025–) ===
In December 2025, ISL leadership confirmed that the league is preparing to resume competition in 2026. The league plans to operate under a reshaped commercial model, expanding sponsorship and media partnerships and staging events across multiple regions including North America, Europe and Asia. Commissioner Ben Allen described autumn 2026 as the “ideal scenario” for a relaunch, with 2027 identified as an alternative target if required.

== Format ==
=== ISL season ===
The season is split into a regular championship and a final. In the regular championship clubs earn points from participating in matches according to the following principles: 4 points for 1st place in the match, 3 for 2nd, 2 for 3rd and 1 for 4th. After all of the championship matches, the 4 clubs with the highest number of points advance to the final, where the winner of the league (the ISL Champions) are determined. Each club can have a maximum roster of 32 athletes. At each match 28 of these are permitted to compete – 12 men and 12 women can swim individual races, while 2 men and 2 women can be used as "relay only" athletes.

=== ISL Matches ===
Four clubs take part in a match, an ISL match lasts two days. During the first season, an ISL match consisted of 37(39 in the 2020 season) races: 30(32) individual, 5 team relays and 2 skin races. Each race consists of 2 representatives from each of the clubs. Points are distributed after the race in the following manner: 9 points for 1st, 7 for 2nd, ... 1 for 8th. Points are not awarded to athletes (teams) that fail to finish a race. In addition, points are doubled in relays and are awarded after each of the 3 skin race heats.

The points of the clubs’ representatives are then added together and go towards the total points result of their respective clubs.

A victory in a race does not guarantee maximum club points. As an example, club representatives that finish 1st and 7th in a race will earn less points for their respective clubs than those who finish 2nd and 4th: they will score 11 and 12 total points, respectively.

A match is won by the club that has scored the most points in all of the 37 races. Similarly, the rest of the clubs are distributed through 2nd to 4th place, respective of the points they score during the entire match. Theoretically, a match could be won by a team that has not won a single race.

In the eventuality two or more clubs end up with the same number of points after the match, an extra mixed medley 4x50m relay shall take place, the outcome of which will mirror the final results of the match.

== Teams ==
The 2019 season debuted with eight clubs in total, four from the United States, and four from Europe. In 2020 clubs from Canada and Japan were added to the league, increasing the total number of clubs to 10.

Team	City	Joined	2020 GMs	2020 Head Coaches
Americas Conference
DC Trident	(United States) Washington, D.C.	2019	Kaitlin Sandeno	Cyndi Gallagher
LA Current	(United States) Los Angeles	2019	Lenny Krayzelburg	David Marsh
New York Breakers	(United States) New York City	2019	Tina Andrew	Martin Truijens
Cali Condors	(United States) San Francisco	2019	Jason Lezak	Jonty Skinner
Toronto Titans	(Canada) Toronto	2020	Robert Kent	Byron MacDonald
Eurasian Conference
Energy Standard	(France) Paris	2019	Jean-Francois Salessy	James Gibson
London Roar	(United Kingdom) London	2019	Rob Woodhouse	Mel Marshall
Team Iron	(Hungary) Budapest	2019	Dorina Szekeres	Jozsef Nagy
Aqua Centurions	(Italy) Rome	2019	Alessandra Guerra	Matteo Giunta
Tokyo Frog Kings	(Japan) Tokyo	2020	Kosuke Kitajima	Dave Salo

=== Draft Process (2021) ===
ISL 2021 Season became the first season in which ISL used a draft to determine rosters.

The ISL Draft is designed to achieve three major objectives:

1. To allow each of the ISL Teams’ General Managers (GMs) to strategically position their team for maximum success in the following season;
2. To allow ISL's less successful teams priority in selecting new team members, thereby establishing a more balanced starting position for the new season;
3. To give the League's new swimmers the possibility to change clubs after their first year in the ISL.

In 2021, this process followed the steps below:

1. Pre-draft: each GM announces 5 pre-selected athletes from their 2020 roster to retain for 2021.
2. Day 1 of Draft: to begin, each GM was able to retain 10 more athletes from their squad from previous season over 4 retention rounds – 4 athletes in the 1st round, 3 in the 2nd, 2 in the 3rd and 1 last athlete in the 4th round. This multi-round system could force some on-the-fly decision-making.
  - Round 1 of draft: only the GMs of the two lowest-finishing teams get to select 1 swimmer each from the ISL Draft Pool in which the lowest-ranked team from the previous season gets the #1 pick and second lowest-ranked team from previous season gets the #2 pick.
  - Fan Voting: After the first round of the draft, the ISL opens a fan vote, allowing each team to retain 1 more athlete from their 2020 roster. To vote, fans had to (1) register on the ISL platform and (2) purchase a subscription to stream either the full ISL season, or one team's specific matches.
3. Day 2 of Draft: ISL draft continues. There are 13 rounds where the lowest-finish teams from the previous season gets picks in the earlier rounds and the top teams gets picks on the later rounds.
4. Post Draft: After the ISL Draft, Team's General Managers can negotiate with remaining swimmers from the ISL Draft Pool to fill out their rosters. This will be possible for the next 60 days after the completion of the draft, but in 2021 this period was shortened to allow for international travel arrangements amid the ongoing pandemic.

PICK ORDER – VISUALIZATION TABLE
Pick #	ROUND 1	ROUND 2	ROUND 3	ROUND 4	ROUND 5–10	ROUND 11	ROUND 12	ROUND 13	ROUND 14
1	#10 Team	#10 Team	#10 Team	#10 Team	#10 Team	#8 Team	#6 Team	#4 Team	#2 Team
2	#9 Team	#9 Team	#9 Team	#9 Team	#9 Team	#7 Team	#5 Team	#3 Team	#1 Team
3		#8 Team	#8 Team	#8 Team	#8 Team	#6 Team	#4 Team	#2 Team	
4		#7 Team	#7 Team	#7 Team	#7 Team	#5 Team	#3 Team	#1 Team	
5			#6 Team	#6 Team	#6 Team	#4 Team	#2 Team		
6			#5 Team	#5 Team	#5 Team	#3 Team	#1 Team		
7				#4 Team	#4 Team	#2 Team			
8				#3 Team	#3 Team	#1 Team			
9					#2 Team				
10					#1 Team				

The final result of the 2021 ISL Draft can be found here and here .

== Technical Rules ==
All the matches are composed of four clubs. and take place on two days, with two two-hour long sessions including two short breaks in each. Each club is composed of a minimum of 24 and a maximum of 28 athletes, 12 Men and 12 Women are permitted to swim individual events while an additional 2 male & 2 female athletes may be included in a Team roster as Relay only swimmers. In each event, all the clubs competing must line up two athletes (and also two teams in the relays).

A standard ISL match takes place during two days. Each day consists of three 30–35-minute sessions, divided by two 10-minute breaks. Each day two adjacent lanes are randomly assigned to each club where the swimmers shall race in the lanes until the end of each competition day. On Day 1 if a club has been assigned outside lanes (7&8 or 1&2), the next day the club shall be guaranteed central lanes (3&4 or 5&6) and vice versa.

Team line-ups are submitted prior to each competition session. These line-ups can be changed and adjusted during the scheduled, the teams will be allowed to submit changes twice during the day at certain moments when the organization will allow this (before each break).

A match consists of 39 races, including 32 individual events, 5 Relays and 2 Skin races, which are open only for the 12 swimmers that have participated in individual events. In addition, if two or more clubs tie in points at the end of the match, an additional mixed medley 4x50 relay shall take place between these clubs’ representatives. All athletes are allowed to participate in this relay. The winner of this relay shall stand higher in the final match rankings than the other club that swam in the relay.

Points are awarded to the teams at the end of each match as follows.

Place	1st	2nd	3rd	4th
Points	4	3	2	1

In 2019, the two American and European teams with the highest number of points after the regular championship, qualify for the Final. If two or more clubs are tied after the regular championship, additional criteria are used to determine the winner.

The scoring for each individual event is as follows (relays races score double the points):

Place	1st	2nd	3rd	4th	5th	6th	7th	8th	DNF	DSQ	DNS
Points	9	7	6	5	4	3	2	1	-2		−4

=== Relay races ===
A particular points scoring system has been introduced for relay races, which score double points than individual events. To force athletes to put their best forward every time they step on the blocks and to avoid a lack of engagement, minimum time standards have been established.

Place	1st	2nd	3rd	4th	5th	6th	7th	8th
Points	18	14	12	10	8	6	4	2

=== Jackpot Times (2020 season) ===
If an athlete is ahead of some athletes in their race by a margin bigger than the jackpot time, the points of these athletes are awarded to the club of the winner of the race. Theoretically, the winner of the race that out touches all of his opponents by more than the jackpot time (full jackpot) can earn 37 points for his club in an individual race (individual full jackpot), 74 points in a relay (relay full jackpot) and 85 points in a skin race, if he manages to win all three stages by more than the jackpot time (triple full jackpot). For example, if the winner for men's 100m freestyle swims 45.00, while the second place swims 47.00, the winner of the race wins full jackpot, since the difference between the leader of the race and the rest of the field was more than the jackpot time margin. Thus, the winner of 100m freestyle would earn 37 points for his team, while the rest of the athletes in the race would earn 0 points. In the case of a full jackpot, all three other teams receive 0 points for the race. In case an athlete fails to show up for a race or gets disqualified, the winner of the race will be awarded with his/her points and that swimmer will receive a penalty according to the "penalties" table. The jackpot times are seen in the table below:

Jackpot Times
Short course meters
	Distance	Men	Women
Freestyle	50	0.85	0.95
Freestyle	100	1.80	2.05
Freestyle	200	4.00	4.50
Freestyle	400	8.50	9.40
Backstroke	50	0.90	1.05
Backstroke	100	2.00	2.20
Backstroke	200	4.30	4.80
Breaststroke	50	1.05	1.15
Breaststroke	100	2.25	2.50
Breaststroke	200	5.00	5.40
Butterfly	50	0.90	1.05
Butterfly	100	2.00	2.20
Butterfly	200	4.40	4.80
Individual Medley	100	2.05	2.30
Individual Medley	200	4.40	4.90
Individual Medley	400	9.40	10.40
Freestyle Relay	4x100	9.00	10.00
Medley Relay	4x100	10.00	11.00
Mixed freestyle	4x100	10.00	

=== Penalties (2019 season) ===
If a relay or swimmer is slower than the times indicated in the table below, it gets a penalty of points. A relay slower than the time standard gets 2 points deducted whereas an individual athlete slower than the respective time indicated gets instead 1 point of penalty.

On the table all of the minimum time standards (SCM) for the events are compared to the world records.

	Distance	Men	World Record	Women	World Record
Freestyle	50	22.50	20.16	25.50	22.93
Freestyle	100	49.50	44.94	55.00	50.25
Freestyle	200	1:49.50	1:39.37	1:58.50	1:50.43
Freestyle	400	3:50.50	3:32.25	4:10.00	3:53.92
Backstroke	50	25.00	22.22	28.50	25.67
Backstroke	100	54.00	48.88	1:01.00	55.03
Backstroke	200	1:58.00	1:45.63	2:11.00	1:59.23
Breaststroke	50	28.50	25.25	31.50	28.56
Breaststroke	100	1:00.00	55.61	1:08.50	1:02.36
Breaststroke	200	2:12.00	2:00.16	2:28.50	2:14.57
Butterfly	50	24.00	21.75	26.50	24.38
Butterfly	100	53.00	47.78	58.50	54.61
Butterfly	200	1:59.50	1:48.24	2:12.00	1:59.61
Individual Medley	200	2:01.00	1:49.63	2:13.50	2:01.86
Individual Medley	400	4:19.00	3:55.50	4:46.50	4:18.94
Freestyle Relay	4x100	3:17.00	3:03.03	3:39.00	3:26.53
Medley Relay	4x100	3:35.50	3:19.16	4:02.00	3:45.20
Mixed freestyle	4x100	3:28.00			

=== Penalties (2020) ===
If an athlete (or a relay team) is disqualified or does not finish the race, points are not awarded for his club, while two points (four for relay teams) are subtracted from the club's overall performance. If an athlete (or a relay team) did not appear for a race, points are not awarded for his club, while four points (eight for relay teams) are subtracted from the club's overall performance. In both cases, the disqualified athlete and the athlete that did not show up, it is considered that those athletes finished the race last, while the points those swimmers received for getting last in a race are awarded to the winner of that race.

Place	DNS	DNF	DSQ
Points in an individual race	−4	-2	
Points in a relay race	-8	-4	

=== MVP ===
A Most Valuable Player (MVP) is determined after each match and at the end of the entire ISL season.

The criteria for an MVP is the number of points the swimmer has accumulated towards the overall team score for

1. the match at hand
2. the whole season.

After each match, only one MVP is selected out of all participating swimmers in that specific match (Match MVP).

At the conclusion of the season one MVP is chosen from all the swimmers who took part in that particular season of ISL (Season MVP).

=== New rules on certain events (2021) ===
1. 400m freestyle: This event provides a total of 53 points (instead of 37). There will be a checkpoint at the 100m mark, where the top 5 swimmers of the event at that moment will have the opportunity to score 6, 4, 3, 2 and 1 points respectively. There will not be a cutoff time at the checkpoint but there will be a jackpot time, which is found earlier on the Jackpot Times table. Important: If at end of the event, a swimmer is jackpotted (at the 400m finish), then if that swimmer had earned any points at the 100m checkpoint, he / she loses those points to the relevant swimmer(s) that passed the 100m checkpoint after him / her.
2. 400m IM: This event also provides a total of 53 points (instead of 37). There will be a checkpoint at the 200m mark, where the top 5 swimmers of the event at that moment will have the opportunity to score 6, 4, 3, 2 and 1 points respectively. There will not be a cutoff time at the checkpoint but there will be a jackpot time (which is found earlier on the Jackpot Times table). If at end of the event, a swimmer is jackpotted (at the 400m finish), then if that swimmer had earned any points at the 200m checkpoint, he / she loses those points to the relevant swimmer(s) that passed the 200m checkpoint after him / her.
3. Stroke selection in Skins races: Shortly after the completion of Day 1 of the Match there will be a selection process to nominate the stroke of the Skins races. The process shall start with identifying the three top Women's and three top Men's ISL teams, which shall be chosen based on the aggregate number of points achieved by their respective squads in the Women's and Men's 4 × 100 m medley relay events. Should there be a tie in the aggregate number of points achieved by two ISL teams, the team whose squad was placed higher in the 4 × 100 m medley relay event shall be nominated to participate or, in case of a tie between any of the three best teams, have an advantage, in the selection process. The Stroke selection in Skins races shall be determined by respective teams’ representatives for Women's and Men's races, as follows:
  - First, the representative of the team that has gained the third-highest number of aggregate relay points chooses the stroke to be excluded from the four potential strokes;
  - Second, the representative of the team that has gained the second-highest number of aggregate relay points chooses the stroke that shall be excluded from the remaining three potential strokes;
  - Finally, the representative of the team that has gained the highest number of aggregate relay points chooses the stroke that they wish to select for the Skins race between the two remaining strokes available for selection.
4. 4 × 100 m mixed relay: In 2021, the 4 × 100 m mixed relay event will be changed from freestyle to medley.

=== Skins Race ===
A skin race is a series of back-to-back-to-back 50 meters (SCM) races of various strokes (Backstroke, Breaststroke, Butterfly or Freestyle) operating on a knockout basis: In the first round four swimmers are eliminated (out of 8), second round two swimmers are eliminated leaving the 3rd and last round consisting of only two swimmers racing each other in a head-to-head final race. Skin races’ rounds are held every 3 minutes. The athletes can warm down in the pool or can get a short massage from their team's physiotherapist behind the blocks between each round. The athletes knocked out of the race must return to their team's area. In Round 3, if a swimmer is disqualified (DSQ), he/she still receives the points he/she accumulated in rounds 1 and 2; and, if both swimmers are DSQ, they will then race again, in order to determine the winner of the round – the race will again be conducted on 3’.

The lanes, that the qualified athletes will use in the following round, are to be determined according to their team's lane assignment for the day. ISL skin races score as follows:

	Place	DNS	DNF	DSQ	8th	7th	6th	5th	4th	3rd	2nd	1st
Round 1	Points	−4	-2		1	2	3	4	5	6	7	9
Round 2	Points	−4	-2						5	6	7	9
Round 3	Points	−4	-2								7	14

=== Budget ===
The 2019 season budget was US$20m, with over US$6m of this being appearance and prize money for the athletes.

== Results by season ==
Season	Rds	Champion	Second	Third	Fourth
2019	7	(France) Energy Standard	(United Kingdom) London Roar	(United States) Cali Condors	(United States) LA Current
2020	9	(United States) Cali Condors	(France) Energy Standard	(United Kingdom) London Roar	(United States) LA Current
2021	9	(France) Energy Standard	(United States) Cali Condors	(United Kingdom) London Roar	(United States) LA Current

== ISL records ==
=== Men ===
Event	Swimmer	Club	Time	City	Date
50m Freestyle	Caeleb Dressel	Cali Condors	20.16	Budapest	21–22 November 2020 (Final)
100m Freestyle	Caeleb Dressel	Cali Condors	45.08	Budapest	21–22 November 2020 (Final)
200m Freestyle	Duncan Scott	London Roar	1:40.25	Budapest	21–22 November 2020 (Final)
400m Freestyle	Danas Rapsys	Energy Standard	3:35.49	Budapest	1–2 November 2020 (Match 6)
50m Backstroke	Ryan Murphy	LA Current	22.54	Budapest	21–22 November 2020 (Final)
100m Backstroke	Coleman Stewart	Cali Condors	48.33	Naples	28–29 August 2021 (Match 2)
200m Backstroke	Evgeny Rylov	Energy Standard	1:46.37	Budapest	21–22 November 2020 (Final)
50m Breaststroke	Emre Sakçi	Team Iron	25.29	Budapest	5–6 November 2020 (Match 7)
100m Breaststroke	Ilya Shymanovich	Energy Standard	55.28	Eindhoven	25–26 November 2021 (Semi-final 5)
200m Breaststroke	Marco Koch	New York Breakers	2:00.58	Budapest	1–2 November 2020 (Match 6)
50m Butterfly	Nicholas Santos	Team Iron	21.78	Budapest	9–10 November 2020 (Match 9)
100m Butterfly	Caeleb Dressel	Cali Condors	47.78	Budapest	21–22 November 2020 (Final)
200m Butterfly	Chad le Clos	Energy Standard	1:48.57	Budapest	21–22 November 2020 (Final)
100m Individual Medley	Caeleb Dressel	Cali Condors	49.28	Budapest	21–22 November 2020 (Final)
200m Individual Medley	Daiya Seto	Energy Standard	1:50.76	Las Vegas	20–21 December 2019 (Final)
400m Individual Medley	Daiya Seto	Energy Standard	3:54.81	Las Vegas	20–21 December 2019 (Final)
Relay 4 × 100 m Freestyle	Evgeny Rylov; Kliment Kolesnikov; Chad le Clos; Florent Manaudou	Energy Standard	3:02.78	Budapest	21–22 November 2020 (Final)
Relay 4 × 100 m Medley	Kliment Kolesnikov; Ilya Shymanovich; Chad le Clos; Florent Manaudou	Energy Standard	3:18.28	Budapest	21–22 November 2020 (Final)

=== Women ===
Event	Swimmer	Club	Time	City	Date	Ref
50m Freestyle	Ranomi Kromowidjojo	Team Iron	23.29	Budapest	26–27 October 2019 (Match 3)	
100m Freestyle	Siobhán Haughey	Energy Standard	50.79	Eindhoven	3–4 December 2021 (Final)	
200m Freestyle	Siobhán Haughey	Energy Standard	1:51.11	Budapest	21–22 November 2020 (Final)	
400m Freestyle	Katie Ledecky	DC Trident	3:54.06	Indianapolis	5–6 October 2019 (Match 1)	
50m Backstroke	Kira Toussaint	London Roar	25.60	Budapest	14–15 November 2020 (Semi-final 1)	
100m Backstroke	Minna Atherton	London Roar	54.89	Budapest	26–27 October 2019 (Match 4)	
200m Backstroke	Minna Atherton	London Roar	1:59.25	London	23–24 November 2019 (Semi-final 2)	
50m Breaststroke	Lilly King	Cali Condors	28.77	Budapest	21–22 November 2020 (Final)	
100m Breaststroke	Lilly King	Cali Condors	1:02.50	Budapest	21–22 November 2020 (Final)	
200m Breaststroke	Lilly King	Cali Condors	2:15.56	Budapest	21–22 November 2020 (Final)	
50m Butterfly	Ranomi Kromowidjojo	Team Iron	24.59	Budapest	5–6 November 2020 (Match 7)	
100m Butterfly	Kelsi Dahlia	Cali Condors	55.22	Naples	4–5 September 2021 (Match 4)	
200m Butterfly	Suzuka Hasegawa	Tokyo Frog Kings	2:03.12	Budapest	24–25 October 2020 (Match 3)	
100m Individual Medley	Béryl Gastaldello	LA Current	57.30	Budapest	21–22 November 2020 (Final)	
200m Individual Medley	Yui Ohashi	Tokyo Frog Kings	2:03.93	Budapest	14–15 November 2020 (Semi-final 1)	
400m Individual Medley	Yui Ohashi	Tokyo Frog Kings	4:23.25	Budapest	14–15 November 2020 (Semi-final 1)	
Relay 4 × 100 m Freestyle	Siobhán Haughey; Pernille Blume; Femke Heemskerk; Sarah Sjöström	Energy Standard	3:25.37	Budapest	21–22 November 2020 (Final)	
Relay 4 × 100 m Medley	Olivia Smoliga; Lilly King; Kelsi Dahlia; Erika Brown	Cali Condors	3:45.58	Budapest	21–22 November 2020 (Final)	

=== Mixed ===
Event	Swimmer	Club	Time	City	Date
4 × 100 m Freestyle	Evgeny Rylov; Florent Manaudou; Sarah Sjöström; Siobhán Haughey	Energy Standard	3:14.21	Budapest	21–22 November 2020 (Final)
4 × 100 m Medley	Ingrid Wilm; Christopher Rothbauer; Tom Shields; Abbey Weitzeil	LA Current	3:33.31	Naples	4–5 September 2021 (Match 4)

== See also ==
- World Aquatics Swimming World Cup
