= Irvine Novaquatics =

Swim team in Irvine, California

Novaquatics
- Nickname: Nova
- Type: swim team; nonprofit organization
- Location: Irvine, California
- Affiliations: part of Southern California Swimming (SCS)

Novaquatics (also known as Nova) is a swim team in Irvine, California. They are a nonprofit organization that receives their funding through membership dues, fundraising events and sponsorships. They are a member of the Orange Committee within Southern California Swimming (SCS); this is a subdivision of USA Swimming. Irvine Novaquatics is part of Southern California Swimming (SCS). Currently, they are one of the largest swim teams in Southern California. They have consistently won championship meets such as Spring Junior Olympics, Summer Junior Olympics, Winter Age Group Championships, Pacific Swimming's annual Speedo Far Western National Age Group Short Course Championships, and the June Invites as well as many other major events.

As of the end of 2006, Novaquatics was the #3 swim team program in the United States by USA Swimming. The club also has locations in Fountain Valley and also Aliso Viejo.

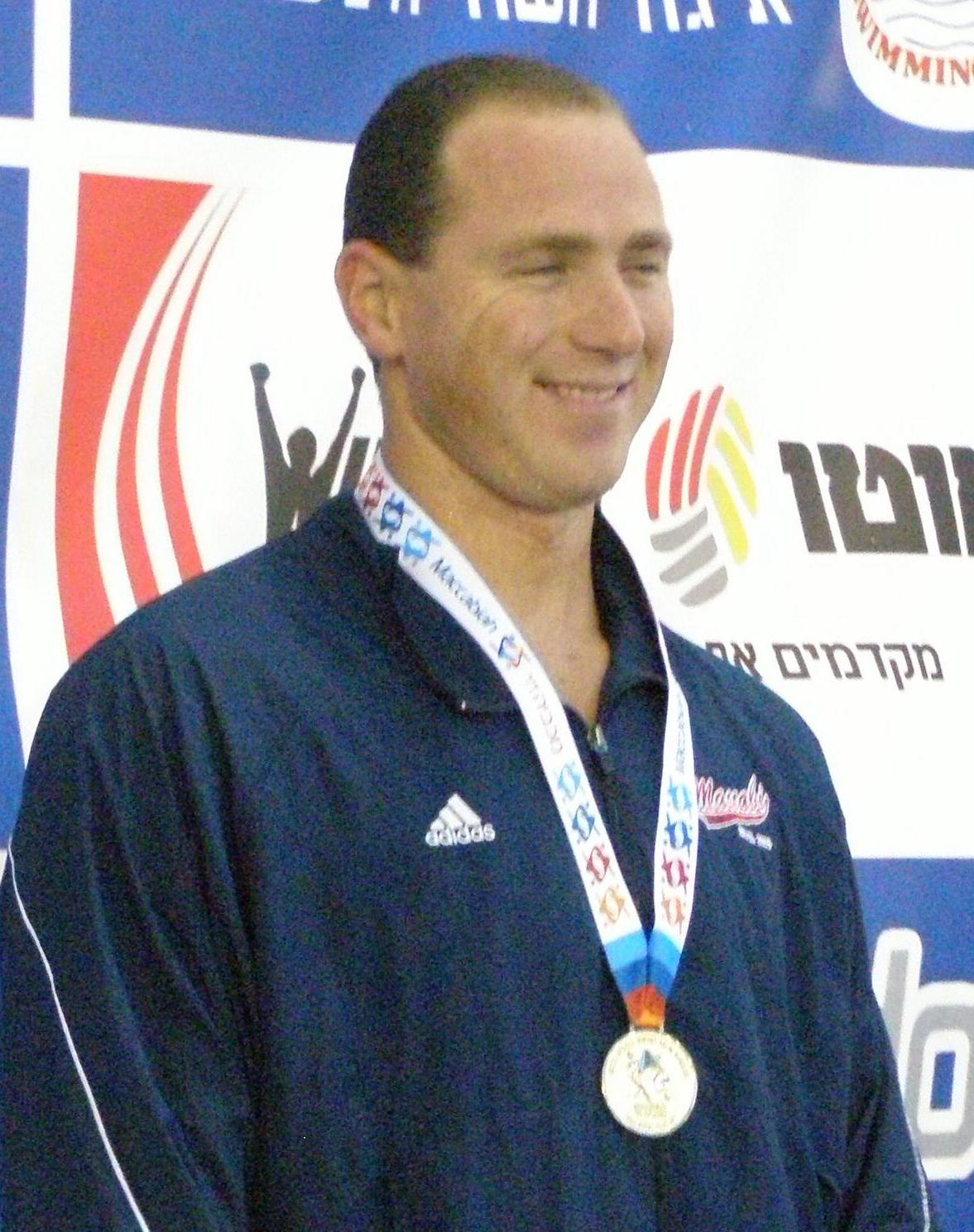
Jason Lezak

Celebrated alumni of the Novaquatics team include Olympians: Amanda Beard, Aaron Peirsol, Jason Lezak, Milorad Čavić, Gabrielle Rose, Staciana Stitts, Jessica Hardy, Lenny Krayzelburg, Gabe Woodward, Colleen Lane, and John Mykkanen. In the mid to late 80's Flip Darr of Novaquatics coached Hall of Fame Distance Swimmer and English Channel record holder Chad Hundeby.

Past head coaches for the club have included Flip Darr, Lucky Forman, Ron Turner, and Dave Salo (1990–2006). Flipp Darr was the Founding Head Coach of the Irvine NOVA. He placed swimmers on the Olympic Teams for the US in ’68, ’72, ’76 and ’84.
