= 2002 Pan Pacific Swimming Championships – Men's 50 metre freestyle =

Men's 50 metre freestyle at the 2002 Pan Pacific Swimming Championships
- Venue: Yokohama International Swimming Pool
- Dates: August 25, 2002 (heats & semifinals); August 26, 2002 (final)
- Competitors: 29 from 13 nations
- Winning time: 22.22

Medalists
gold medal	Jason Lezak	United States
silver medal	Anthony Ervin	United States
bronze medal	Brett Hawke	Australia

The men's 50 metre freestyle competition at the 2002 Pan Pacific Swimming Championships took place on August 25–26 at the Yokohama International Swimming Pool. The last champion was Brendon Dedekind of South Africa.

This race consisted of one length of the pool in freestyle.

== Records ==
Prior to this competition, the existing world and Pan Pacific records were as follows:

World record	Alexander Popov (RUS)	21.64	Moscow, Russia	June 16, 2000
Pan Pacific Championships record	Brendon Dedekind (RSA)	22.06	Sydney, Australia	August 28, 1999

== Results ==
All times are in minutes and seconds.

KEY:	q	Fastest non-qualifiers	Q	Qualified	CR	Championships record	NR	National record	PB	Personal best	SB	Seasonal best

=== Heats ===
The first round was held on August 25.

Rank	Heat	Lane	Name	Nationality	Time	Notes
1	3	4	Anthony Ervin	United States	22.43	Q
2	4	4	Jason Lezak	United States	22.80	Q
3	4	5	Brett Hawke	Australia	22.93	Q
4	2	4	Ashley Callus	Australia	23.02	Q
4	4	6	Issei Nakanishi	Japan	23.02	Q
6	2	2	Renato Gueraldi	Brazil	23.08	Q
7	3	5	Aaron Ciarla	United States	23.12	Q
8	3	6	Thomas Hannan	United States	23.14	Q
9	2	6	Adam Pine	Australia	23.20	Q
10	2	5	Yannick Lupien	Canada	23.25	Q
11	3	2	Naoki Nagura	Japan	23.31	Q
12	2	3	Nicholas Santos	Brazil	23.35	Q
13	3	3	Richard Bera	Indonesia	23.45	Q
14	3	8	Kohei Kawamoto	Japan	23.50	Q
15	2	7	Guilherme Roth	Brazil	23.55	Q
16	4	1	Brent Hayden	Canada	23.62	Q
17	2	1	Mark Herring	New Zealand	23.68	
18	4	3	Ravil Nachaev	Uzbekistan	23.72	
19	4	7	André Cordeiro	Brazil	23.79	
20	4	8	Carl Probert	Fiji	23.92	
21	3	7	Geoff Huegill	Australia	23.94	
22	2	8	Tan Lee Yu Gary	Singapore	24.22	
23	1	4	Jun Mark Chay Jung	Singapore	24.59	
24	3	1	Wing Harbeth Fu	Hong Kong	24.67	
25	1	5	Kenneth Kin Lun Doo	Hong Kong	24.84	
26	1	3	Kwok Kei Wong	Hong Kong	25.92	
27	1	2	Dean Palacios	Northern Mariana Islands	26.19	
28	1	6	Kin Duenas	Guam	26.67	
29	1	7	Seung Gin Lee	Northern Mariana Islands	26.98	
-	4	2	Todd Pearson	Australia	DNS	

=== Semifinals ===
The semifinals were held on August 25.

Rank	Heat	Lane	Name	Nationality	Time	Notes
1	1	4	Jason Lezak	United States	22.18	Q
2	2	5	Brett Hawke	Australia	22.43	Q
3	2	4	Anthony Ervin	United States	22.48	Q
4	1	5	Ashley Callus	Australia	22.64	Q
5	2	6	Aaron Ciarla	United States	22.84	Q
6	1	6	Thomas Hannan	United States	22.86	Q
7	2	2	Adam Pine	Australia	22.98	Q
8	1	3	Renato Gueraldi	Brazil	23.05	?
8	2	3	Issei Nakanishi	Japan	23.05	?
10	1	2	Yannick Lupien	Canada	23.15	
11	2	7	Naoki Nagura	Japan	23.18	
12	1	7	Nicholas Santos	Brazil	23.22	
13	2	1	Richard Bera	Indonesia	23.43	
14	1	1	Guilherme Roth	Brazil	23.50	
15	1	8	André Cordeiro	Brazil	23.69	
16	2	8	Mark Herring	New Zealand	23.74	

=== Final ===
The final was held on August 26.

Rank	Lane	Name	Nationality	Time	Notes
1st place, gold medalist(s)	4	Jason Lezak	United States	22.22	
2nd place, silver medalist(s)	3	Anthony Ervin	United States	22.28	
3rd place, bronze medalist(s)	5	Brett Hawke	Australia	22.40	
4	6	Ashley Callus	Australia	22.56	
5	1	Yannick Lupien	Canada	22.81	
6	7	Issei Nakanishi	Japan	23.00	
7	2	Renato Gueraldi	Brazil	23.05	
8	8	Naoki Nagura	Japan	23.29	
