= Ryan Berube =

American swimmer (born 1973)

Personal information
- Full name: Ryan Thomas Berube
- National team: United States
- Born: December 26, 1973 (age 52) Tequesta, Florida, U.S.
- Height: 5 ft 11 in (1.80 m)
- Weight: 150 lb (68 kg)
- Spouse: Michelle

Sport
- Sport: Swimming
- Strokes: Freestyle, individual medley, backstroke
- Club: N. Palm Beach Club; Dallas Mustangs
- College team: Southern Methodist University
- Coach: Eddie Sinnott, SMU; Dick Cavanah, N. Palm Beach
Medal record
Men's swimming
Representing the United States
Olympic Games
Gold medal – first place	1996 Atlanta	4x200 m freestyle
Pan American Games
Gold medal – first place	1995 Mar del Plata	4×200 m freestyle
Summer Universiade
Gold medal – first place	1993 Buffalo	4×200 m freestyle

Ryan Thomas Berube (born December 26, 1973) is an American former competition swimmer and freestyle and individual medley specialist for Southern Methodist University who won the gold medal anchoring the U.S. men's team in the 4×200-meter freestyle relay at the 1996 Summer Olympics in Atlanta, Georgia. A business major at SMU, he would later work as a wealth manager, and serve two decades on various boards and committees of USA Swimming.

== High school swimming ==
Berube was born on December 26, 1973 in Tequesta, Florida to Susan and Richard Berube and grew up swimming, boating, and water skiing on Florida's East coast. He began receiving swim training from Coach Dick Cavanah at the North Palm Beach Country Club, beginning around age 11. An attendee and 1992 graduate of The Benjamin School in Palm Beach, he trained with their swim team, also coached by Dick Cavanah. Cavanah, a former elite competitive swimmer for the University of Missouri and seasoned coach, took his first coaching job in 1971. He began coaching at The Benjamin School in 1977 and the North Palm Beach Country Club in 1975.

While swimming for the Benjamin School as a Senior, Berube became a state champion and set personal best times winning the 500 freestyle in 4:26.35, and the 200 Individual Medley in 1:49.49 at the Class 3A Florida State Championship in 1991. At the State Championship's 200 Medley Relay event, he demonstrated exceptional speed for a middle distance swimmer, recording a personal best time of 20.6 for his 50 freestyle anchor leg, though the team took third place with a combined time of 1:39.98.

Showing leadership as he matured as a swimmer, he was Captain of the 1991 U.S. National Junior Team. Receiving recognition as an outstanding regional performer, he was named "Boy's Swimmer of the Year", and made the Palm Beach Post's "All Area Swim Team". In statewide competition two months before starting SMU, at the Sunshine State Games in July, 1992, he won five events, receiving a plaque for the most points in the Senior Men's Division.

=== 1992 Olympic trials ===
At the U.S. Open Swim Championship in Minneapolis, Minnesota in December 1991, Berube placed fifth in the finals of the 200 Individual Medley with a 2:05.79, and fourth in the finals of the 400-meter Individual Medley which qualified him in two events for the 1992 Olympic trials. At the 1992 trials in Indianapolis, he finished 13th in the 200 Individual Medley in a field of 34, and 14th in the 400 Individual Medley with a time of 4:28.08. He performed well, but did not make the U.S. team. In his Senior year in High School, he was recruited by UCLA, Southern Methodist University, Stanford, and the University of Texas, but chose SMU.

== Southern Methodist University ==
Berube attended Southern Methodist University beginning in August 1992, where he trained and competed with the SMU Swim team from 1993-1996 under Head Coach Eddie Sinnott. During his swimming career at SMU, he earned All-American honors 26 times, and was a Southwestern Conference champion six times. He was honored as the NCAA Swimmer of the Year in 1996, after capturing the 200-meter IM in 1:44.85, the 100-yard backstroke in 46.15 and the 200-yard backstroke in 1:41.23 at the NCAA Championships. In his last year as a competitor, he served as SMU's swim team captain for the 1995-96 season.

He graduated SMU with a Bachelors in Business Administration and a major in history as well as earning a Bachelors in Business Science (BBS), with a major in finance. Though he became best known as a freestyle relay competitor, he set a Southwestern Conference record in the 200-yard backstroke of 1:43.13 at the Southwestern Conference Championships in Austin in early March, 1994 and swam the lead off in SMU's 400-yard freestyle relay team which placed second with a time of 2:56.79.3. Diverse in his stroke skills, Berube held SMU records in the 200 Individual Medley, and both the 100, and 200 backstroke. Prior to his Olympic competition in 1996, his coach Eddie Sinnott noted that Berube consistently performed well under pressure, and that he was usually able to maintain a fast pace without fading due to conditioning and a strong kick. Berube's Olympic performance as anchor in the Atlanta Olympics seemed to confirm Sinnott's evaluation. With an engagement just before the Olympics in 1996, in June 1997 Berube married Michelle Stackhouse, an SMU cross country runner in her Senior year. Their reception was at the Hall of State in Dallas's Fair Park, where the Texas State Fair is held each Fall.

He swam on the 1993 U.S. team that won a gold medal in the 4x200 freestyle relay at the World University Games. He later was a member of the 1995 U.S. Pan American Team in Mar Del Plata Argentina that won a gold medal in the 4x200 freestyle relay in a games record time of 7:21.61.

== 1996 Olympic Gold medal ==
Berube qualified for the 1996 Atlanta Olympics at the U.S. trials in Indianapolis, by capturing a third-place finish in the finals of the 200-meter freestyle with a personal best time of 1:49.37.

He anchored the U.S. men's four-person team in the 4×200-meter freestyle relay at the 1996 Summer Olympics in Atlanta, Georgia. Berube was managed at the Olympics by Hall of Fame Coach Skip Kenney. Though the race was nearly tied at 400 meters, Berube maintained a strong pace for the last 200 meters to touch about 1.7 seconds ahead of second place Sweden to win the event with a combined team time of 7:14.84. The third-place German finishers swam a tight race, finishing only .15 seconds behind second place Sweden. In addition to the enthusiastic home crowd in Atlanta, his parents, and Coach Cavanah were in the stands to cheer on Berube and the winning American team.

=== Later life ===
Berube has participated as a celebrity swimmer with Swim Across America, a charitable organization that raises money for cancer research. He lives with his wife, Michele, and their two sons, in Dallas, Texas. He has served as a wealth manager for UBS Private Wealth Management working primarily with clients who are accomplished entrepreneurs.

Since leaving elite competition, he has trained with United States Masters Swimming from around 2010-2019 with the Lone Star Swim Club, known as Dallas Aquatic Masters coached by 1972 Olympian Jim Montgomery and more recently with Pegasus Aquatic Masters, coached by Bobby Patten where he has competed primarily in IM, breast, back, and freestyle events. In 2010, he received All-American honors with U.S. Masters Swimming, finishing first in a 50-yard backstroke event for ages 35–39.

He travelled domestically giving swim clinics after his swimming career as an elite competitor ended, acting as a speaker and providing instruction at a clinic in March, 2010 with 1992 Olympic gold medalist Cris Perham and 1968 Olympic gold medalist Debbie Meyer at New York's Flushing YMCA as part of USA Swimming's Gold Medal Clinic. For two decades he served with USA Swimming, starting as an athlete representative and eventually serving on several boards and committees including rules and regulations and later USA Swimming's insurance company. Continuing to serve the swimming community in later years, he has chaired Dallas's chapter of Swim Across America, helped fund raise for SMU's new swimming facility, worked on the board of the US Olympians' Southwest Chapter, and spent some time swim coaching young children.

=== Honors ===
Berube received the honor of being named NCAA Swimmer of the Year in 1996, his last year swimming with SMU. He was inducted into the SMU Athletic Hall of Fame in 2015 and the Texas Swimming and Diving Hall of Fame in 2020, partly for his sustained contributions to USA Swimming and the Texas swimming and diving community. In 2010, he became one of the initial members of the Benjamin School's Athletic Hall of Fame in Palm Beach, Florida.

== See also ==
- List of Olympic medalists in swimming (men)
- List of Southern Methodist University people
