= Eddie Sinnott =

American swimmer and coach (1954–2024)

Biographical details
- Born: February 24, 1954; Greenwich, Connecticut, U.S.
- Died: February 20, 2024 (aged 69); Stover, Missouri, U.S.
- Education: Southern Methodist University

Playing career
- 1972–1976: Southern Methodist University
- Positions: Individual Medley, backstroke

Coaching career (HC unless noted)
- 1980–1985: SMU Assistant Coach
- 1985–1988: LSU Assistant Coach
- 1988: Iowa State Head Coach
- 1989–2019: Southern Methodist University; Head coach
- 1993: Team USA; World University Games
- 1996: Olympic Coach, Haiti
- 2008: U.S. Olympic Team; Asst. Manager

Accomplishments and honors

Championships
- 16 Conference Championships (SMU) '98 SEC Championships (LSU)

Awards
- 2019 National Collegiate Scholastic Trophy; 16 Coach of the Year Honors

Eddie Lawrence Sinnott (February 24, 1954 – February 20, 2024) was an American All-American competition swimmer for Southern Methodist University, who coached the Southern Methodist swim team for thirty years from 1989 to 2019, leading them to 16 league crowns and 11 top NCAA Division 1 finishes.

Sinnott was born in Greenwich, CT on February 24, 1954, to Anita and Lawrence Sinnott, one of eight siblings. Along with several of his siblings, he attended St. Mary's High School in Greenwich. He held many state and local swimming records during his High School years and competed for the Stamford, Connecticut Swim Club. He excelled in swimming and could compete in all four strokes, but played other sports as well.

== Early sports and swimming ==
At the Connecticut Long Course Junior Swimming Championship in New London on July 15, 1971, swimming for the Stamford, Connecticut Dolphins Swim Club, Sinnott demonstrated diverse stroke skills, swimming a 1:07.9 for the Boys' 110-yard backstroke, and a 2:28.0 in the 220-yard medley in the 15–17 age group. By 1972, he had distinguished himself as a High School All American, placing third in the 200 freestyle at the AAU Metropolitan Championships in Roslyn, Long Island in July, 1972. In the summer Sinnott played softball, and was a very capable hitter, knocking in 17 runs while hitting three home runs as a sixteen year old in the Saugerties Softball League playoffs.

Helping his Stamford Dolphins Swim Club win the meet on points, Sinnott won both the 400 freestyle and the 200 Individual Medley at the Region 1 AAU Long Course Swimming Championships in Princeton, New Jersey on July 21, 1970. By winning the regional meet, the Dolphins and Sinnott advanced to the Eastern Championships. Again swimming for the Dolphin Swim Club of Stamford, Connecticut, Sinnott placed third in the 400-meter individual medley at the Eastern USA Swimming Championships on August 7, 1971.

== Swimming for SMU ==
Swimming at SMU from 1972 to 1976, he earned All-America honors in 1973 and 1974, was a four-time letter winner, and in 1973 captured the Southwest Conference Championship in the 400 IM. Sinnott graduated SMU in 1979 with a degree in Physical Education.

By his Junior year, Sinnott was an All-American specializing in backstroke but missed much of the 1975 season recovering from an appendicitis. On July 9, 1974, swimming for the Dolphin Swim Club in an AAU meet in New London, Connecticut that summer while away from SMU, Sinnott placed third in the 220-yard freestyle, and the 100-yard backstroke, and third again in the 110-yard butterfly, though swimmers from Yale dominated the meet. By 1975, Sinnott's Junior year, SMU, then an established power, had won 18 straight Southwest Conference Titles, won the SWC and Houston Invitationals, defeated Oklahoma, Texas Christian, the University of Miami, and were favored to beat the University of Texas. The team had an exceptional record under Coach George McMillion that year. Sinnott's ability to compete in multiple strokes including the individual medley made him more valuable to some future employers as a potential swim coach.

== Coaching ==
Gaining valuable experience, Sinnott was an Assistant Coach at SMU from around 1980 to 1985 while the team finished in the top ten in the NCAA tournament in each of the years he was a staff member. In a very early coaching position, he assistant coached both the Men's and Women's swim teams at Louisiana State University from 1985 to 1988. In 1988, he coached LSU when they were winners of the Southeastern Conference Title. Sinnott replaced Bob Groseth as Head Coach at Iowa State in May 1988, but did not hold the position for long.

Taking the position as Head Coach at SMU the following year, from 1989 to 2019, his teams won 16 conference championships, consisting of four WAC Championships from 1997 to 2000, five in the NIC conference from 2001 to 2005, and seven in Conference-USA from 2006 to 2010, and 2012 to 2013. He had 16 Coach of the year honors including 3 with the Southwestern Conference, 3 with the Western Athletic Conference, 3 with the NIC conference, 6 with Conference-USA, and 1 with the Big 8 Conference.

The 1990s were the peak of SMU swimming performance for Sinnott, as the Mustangs finished in the top 10 at the NCAAs every year from 1991 through 1998. In his most distinctive honor, Sinnott was a recipient of the 2019 National Collegiate Scholastic Trophy in 2019 by a vote of his swimming community peers. Presented by the CSCAA and the National Interscholastic Swimming Coaches Association (NISCA), the trophy is awarded to the coach "who has made the greatest contribution to swimming as a competitive sport, and as a healthful, recreational activity in the province of undergraduate and scholastic education".

=== Olympic swimmers coached ===
Sinnott coached 11 Olympic athletes at 7 Olympic Games.

In 1996, Sinnott coached SMU swimmer Ryan Berube to a gold medal as a team member of the U.S. 4×200 free relay team. In the summer of 2000, Lars Frolander became the fourth SMU swimmer to capture a gold medal at the Olympic Games, winning the 100 butterfly in Sydney, Australia. During Sinnott's coaching tenure, both Berube and Frolander were recipients of the NCAA Swimmer of the Year award within two years, with Berube receiving the award in 1996, and Frolander in 1998. Sinnott also coached Slovak swimmer Martina Moravcová at SMU, who competed for Slovakia in five consecutive summer Olympics from 1992 to 2008 and won the Honda Sports Award as the nation's top female swimmer in 1999. He coached Andrea Podmaníková who competed in breaststroke for Slovakia in the 2020 Tokyo Olympics.

=== Swimming community ===
Sinnott served as head coach of the U.S. National Team in 1987 during its European Tour, and was the U.S. Olympic Team assistant manager during the 2008 Olympics. In addition to working as a U.S. Coach, Sinnott worked for the Olympic International Organizing Committee from 1984 to 1992. He was the head coach for Haiti at the 1996 Olympic Games and was Assistant Coach for Colombia, Denmark and South Africa at the World Short Course Championships. Sinnott also helped raise funds for the new Robson & Lindley Aquatics Center at SMU and the Barr-McMillion Natatorium.

After coaching retirement, Eddie and wife Sioux relocated to Stover, Missouri to spend more time with family. The couple gravitated toward The Dale Hollow Winery, gaining a greater sense of community and friendship. Eddie expanded his friendships, volunteered, and found new hobbies in his retirement. He fought melanoma skin cancer in his final years, and died on February 20, 2024, in Stover among friends and family. He was a few days shy of his 70th birthday.
