= Dave Salo =

American swimming coach

Biographical details
- Born: September 3, 1958; California, U.S.
- Education: Long Beach State BA, MA; University of Southern California PHd.

Playing career
- 1972–1976: Petaluma Swim Club; Larry Lack, Coach
- 1976–1979: Santa Rosa Junior College; Bob Miyashiro, Coach
- 1979–1980: Long Beach State; Jon Urbanchek, Coach

Coaching career (HC unless noted)
- 1981–1982: Long Beach State (Asst. Women's Coach)
- 1985–1990: University of Southern California (Asst. under Peter Daland)
- 1990–2006: Irvine Novaquatics
- 2000-2004: Orange Coast College
- 2003–2006: Soka University
- 2006–2020: University of Southern California; Head coach
- 2024-: Arizona State University

Accomplishments and honors

Championships
- 2015-2016 Pac-12 Conference Champions (USC Men's Team); 2003 State Title (Orange Coast College); 2002 Spring and Summer national titles (Novaquatics)

Awards
- 2010 ASCA Hall of Honor; 2002 U.S. Swim Coach of the Year (Novaquatics)

David Clark Salo (born September 3, 1958) is an American swimming coach, who swam for Santa Rosa Junior College and Long Beach State. He is best known for serving as an Assistant Coach at the University of Southern California (USC) from 1985-90 where he was mentored by USC Hall of Fame Head Coach Peter Daland, and then returning to USC as Head Coach from 2007-2020. While an Assistant Coach at USC, the trojan swim team were National NCAA runner-up finishers from 1986-7. During his subsequent tenure as USC Head Coach after 2007, he led the men's swim team to two Pac-12 Conference Championships from 2015-2016 and the women's team to their initial Pac-12 Championship. While coaching the Irvine Novaquatics, from 1990-2006, he led his teams to several U.S. National and Junior National championships. He coached over 15 Olympians during his career and was an Assistant Coach for the U.S. Olympic swim team in the 2000, 2004 and 2012 Olympic games.

== Early life and swimming ==
Salo was born September 3, 1958 to parents Jack and Marlys Salo and grew up in Rohnert Park, California in Greater Santa Rosa. A sports enthusiast, Salo's father Jack, an accomplished golfer, had worked as a High School Football Coach and recreation director in Mount Shasta, California, and after a mid-1960's move to Rohnert Park, served on committees for the College View Youth Football league. With parental support, Salo began swimming competitively by seven, and trained and competed with the Sting Ray Swimming team of Rohnert Park. In May 1966, he had a first place finish in the 25-yard breaststroke swimming for the Sting Rays at the college of Marin. Showing stroke diversity, while swimming for the Novato Aquanauts he won a 100 Individual Medley with a time of 1:22.7, and a 200 Individual Medley with a time of 3:01.7. A Boy Scout in his youth, he made honor roll while attending Rohnert Park Junior High.

=== High School era ===
In June 1976, Salo graduated California's Rancho Cotate High School, around seven miles south of Santa Rosa. At Rancho Cotate, he competed in swimming all four years, received an American Legion Cotati Post Scholarship in his Senior year and in February 1976 was an honor roll student. As a versatile Rancho Cotate swimmer, he was a frequent point scorer and helped lead the team to two successive Sonoma County league pennants. At the Santa Clara Invitational Swim Meet in June 1973, swimming for the Petaluma Swim Club in the boys 13-14 age group, Salo was third in the 200-meter breaststroke event with a time of 2:49.4, and fifth in the 100 meter breaststroke with a time of 1:18.9. At 16 in March 1974, Salo set a Rancho Cotate age-group school record in the 200 freestyle of 2:15.8. While swimming for Rancho Cotate High, Salo was coached by Jim Dougherty. Though a competent freestyler, Salo specialized in back, breast, and individual medley events where he set a few age group and regional records during his High School and collegiate swimming careers. Swimming for his Rancho Cotate High in an early season meet against Napa High in February 1974, Salo won the 100-yard breaststroke in 1:11.1, the 200-yard individual medley in 2:19.4 and was on a winning 200-yard medley relay team that swam a 1:56.7. Swimming for the Petaluma Swim Club under Coach Larry Lack, Salo qualified for Ithaca New York's National Junior Olympics in August 1975, following his High School Junior year.

== Higher education ==
From 1976-78, Salo swam for Santa Rosa Junior College where he was managed by fifth year Santa Rosa Coach Bob Miyashiro. Swimming for Santa Rosa Junior College in March 1978, Salo swam a 2:25.75 for the 200 breaststroke, and a 2:12.78 for the 200 Individual Medley.

He transferred to Long Beach State in September 1978, a strong program where he competed and trained under Hall of Fame Coach Jon Urbanchek. A nationally recognized swim team, Long Beach State had featured a few former Hall of Fame Coaches including Don Gambril from 1967-1971, and Richard Jochums from 1971-1978. During Salo's tenure with the team, Urbanchek's Long Beach men's swimming team sent swimmers to the NCAA Championships for the 1979-1982 seasons. Salo also competed in water polo at Long Beach State, later graduating with a B.A. and then an M.A. in exercise physiology. While at Long Beach State in 1979, he coached the Downey Dolphin swim club as Head Coach, and in his first collegiate coaching position, was an assistant women’s swimming coach for the Long Beach State women's team in 1981 and 1982.

He later obtained his Phd. from the University of Southern California in 1991.

== USC Assistant Coach ==
Salo worked from 1985-90 as an Assistant Coach at the University of Southern California where he was mentor by Hall of Fame Head Coach Peter Daland. While at USC, he assisted with the sprint group while also serving as recruiting coordinator during his final two years at the university. During his tenure the Trojans earned NCAA top five honours, taking second in 1986 and 1987.

=== Novaquatics, Soka University Head Coach ===
He was hired as head coach of the Irvine Novaquatics in 1990 where he served through 2006. While head coach of the Irvine Novaquatics, he led the team to age group championships in both BC and Junior Olympic competition, several Junior National Team Championships. He led the Novaquatics to United States Swimming National Championships in competition categories Men, Women, Combined, and Combined Under 18. While serving as Novaquatics head coach, Salo was simultaneously director of aquatics and head coach at Soka University of America from 2003-2006.

== Return to University of Southern California ==
After leaving the Novaquatics in 2006, Salo returned to the University of Southern California as Head Coach in 2007 through 2020, replacing former Hall of Fame Head Coach Mark Schubert. During his time at USC, Salo also shared responsibilities as coach for the Trojan Swim Club. He led the USC men's team to two PAC-12 Championship from 2015-2016, and led the women's team to their historic initial PAC-12 Championship during his tenure. He continued as the Novaquatics' General Manager.

=== International coaching ===
Salo was an assistant coach for the USA Women's team in the 1999 Pan American Games as well as the 2000 Olympic Games and headed the Men's Team at the Goodwill Games in 2001 and the 2005 World Championship Team.

Significantly, Salo served as an Assistant U.S. Olympic Coach at the 2000, 2004 and 2012 Olympic Games.

After stepping down as USC Coach in 2020, Salo became head coach of the Tokyo Frog Kings in the International Swimming League.

=== Arizona State University ===
In May 2024, Salo was named Associate Head Coach for both the men's and women's swimming and diving programs at Arizona State University.

=== Outstanding swimmers ===
Along with team championships, Salo coached five swimmers – Amanda Beard, Aaron Peirsol, Jason Lezak, and Gabrielle Rose, and Staciana Stitts who represented the United States at the 2000 Olympic Games, winning five medals. He coached Amanda Beard, Aaron Peirsol and Jason Lezak as part of the Irvine Novaquatics.

In 2004, Salo coached Jason Lezak, Colleen Lanne', Gabe Woodward and Lenny Krayzelburg to the USA Olympic Team. He also served as assistant coach for the USA's men's team.

Australian freestyler Ian Thorpe trained with Salo in Summer 2006.

In 2012, as an Assistant coach on the Olympic staff, Salo coached Jessica Hardy, Rebecca Soni, Ricky Berens, Eric Shanteau, and Haley Anderson to the USA Olympic Team, along with Katinka Hosszú to the Hungarian Team and Oussama Mellouli to the Tunisia Team. His relationship with Hosszú has been controversial; according to her, when she looked for advice during the 2012 Summer Olympics, Salo replied that she should worry because she "can always open a beauty salon"; after the incident, Hosszú left Salo and began training with Shane Tusup.

=== Honors ===
In 2010, Salo became a member of the American Swimming Coaches Association Hall of Fame, and was formerly a Pac-12 Conference Coach of the Year.
