= Penny Lee Dean =

American long distance swimmer (born 1955)

Personal information
- Born: March 21, 1955 (age 71) San Francisco, California, United States
- Height: 157 cm (5 ft 2 in)

Sport
- Sport: Swimming
- Strokes: Long-distance swimming

Penny Lee Dean is an American long distance swimmer who began her career with her swim across frigid San Francisco bay at age 10. She is best known for having the fastest time for anyone to swim from Catalina to California in 7:15:55 in 1976, and the fastest time to swim the English Channel in 1978 in 7:40.

Dean was born on March 21, 1955, in San Francisco, California, United States, to Joseph Edward and Frances (Von Hermann) Dean.

== Education ==
In 1977, Dean completed her Bachelor in History from Pomona College in Claremont, California, then three years later in 1980 completed a Master of Science in Physical Education, from California Polytechnic Institute. Wanting to teach at a University, she finished the work for a Doctor of Education, at the United States Sports Academy at Daphne, Alabama, in 1996.

== Catalina swimming record ==
Later, as a swimmer for Pomona College, she was a six-time All-American. By 1976, she had swum from the mainland of California to Catalina Island in the overall world record of 7:15:55 - 1.5 hours under the former record, and a record that still stands. The next year she set the world record from the island to the mainland on her way to a 40-mile double crossing of the Catalina Channel in 20:03.

== English Channel swimming record ==
Dean is perhaps best known for her world record for the fastest swim across the English Channel in 1978 in a time of 7:40, shattering the previous record by over 1 h and 5 mins. The record stood for both men and women until September 1995, when it was lowered to 7:17 by Chad Hundeby, whom Dean coached.

== Swimming career ==
She continued her long-distance swimming career for another three years, winning at Windermere in England, Lake St. John, LaTugue, Lakes Memphremagog and Paspebiac in Quebec, and Atlantic City in New Jersey, setting women's world records in most of them. She was Women's World Professional Champion in 1979, accumulating 1,000 points over her next rival.

== Coaching ==
Dean served as U.S. National Team Coach of Open Water Swimming from 1988 through 1991, Head Coach of U.S. teams to the 1991 Pan Pacific Championships, 1991 World Championships, 1982 and 1990 Windermere Championships, 1990 English Channel Race, 1984 and 1989 Catalina Channel Race and coach of nine solo Catalina Channel crossers.

== Honors ==
Dean was admitted to the International Swimming Hall of Fame in 1996. She was an All American Coach, United States Swimming, 1984, 86, 89, and a recipient of the Hummer award, 1985. She was named Distinguished Coach/Master, College Swim Coaches in 1993. She was the Southern California Intercollegiate Athletics (chairman 1993-1996).

Dean was forced to give up competition in the early 1980s when her doctors urged her to stop all exercise as years of swimming had taken its toll on her body. She taught as a professor of physical education and the women's swimming and water polo coach at Pomona College for over 25 years.

== See also ==
- List of members of the International Swimming Hall of Fame
