= Jason Lezak =

American swimming executive (born 1975)

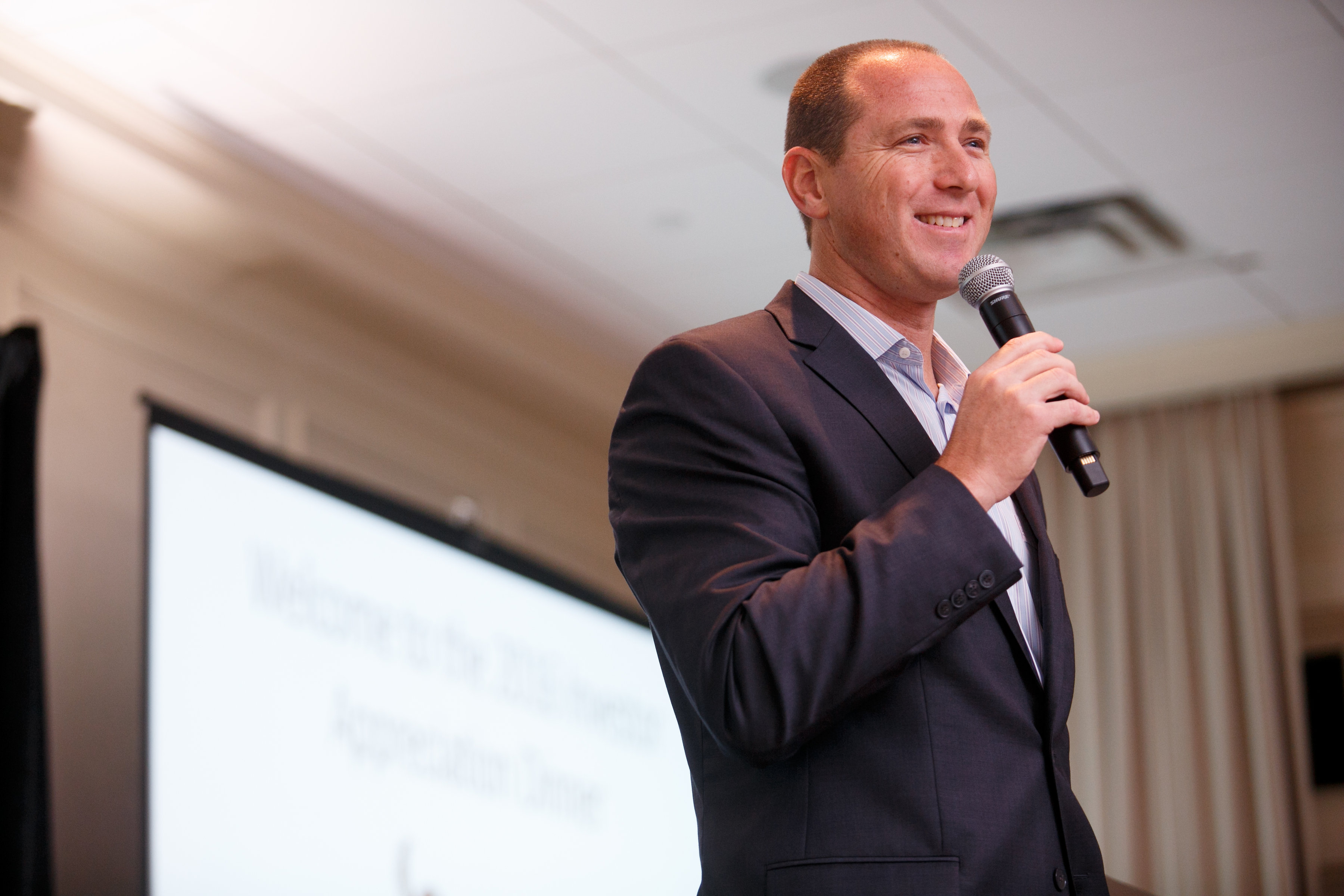
- Lezak speaking in 2016

Personal information
- Full name: Jason Edward Lezak
- National team: United States
- Born: November 12, 1975 (age 50) Irvine, California, U.S.
- Height: 6 ft 4 in (193 cm)
- Weight: 216 lb (98 kg)
- Spouse: Daniele DeVillers

Sport
- Sport: Swimming
- Strokes: Freestyle
- Club: Cali Condors; Irvine Novaquatics; Rose Bowl Aquatics
- College team: University of California, Santa Barbara
- Coach: Gregg Wilson (UC Santa Barbara); Dave Salo (Novaquatics)
Medal record
Men's swimming
Representing United States
Event	1st	2nd	3rd
Olympic Games	4	2	2
World Championships (LC)	4	1	1
World Championships (SC)	5	1	1
Pan Pacific Championships	5	3	0
Universiade	1	0	0
Maccabiah Games	4	0	0
Total	23	7	4
Olympic Games
Gold medal – first place	2000 Sydney	4×100 m medley
Gold medal – first place	2004 Athens	4×100 m medley
Gold medal – first place	2008 Beijing	4×100 m freestyle
Gold medal – first place	2008 Beijing	4×100 m medley
Silver medal – second place	2000 Sydney	4×100 m freestyle
Silver medal – second place	2012 London	4×100 m freestyle
Bronze medal – third place	2004 Athens	4×100 m freestyle
Bronze medal – third place	2008 Beijing	100 m freestyle
World Championships (LC)
Gold medal – first place	2003 Barcelona	4×100 m medley
Gold medal – first place	2005 Montreal	4×100 m freestyle
Gold medal – first place	2005 Montreal	4×100 m medley
Gold medal – first place	2007 Melbourne	4×100 m freestyle
Silver medal – second place	2003 Barcelona	4×100 m freestyle
Bronze medal – third place	2011 Shanghai	4×100 m freestyle
World Championships (SC)
Gold medal – first place	2002 Moscow	4×100 m freestyle
Gold medal – first place	2002 Moscow	4×100 m medley
Gold medal – first place	2004 Indianapolis	100 m freestyle
Gold medal – first place	2004 Indianapolis	4×100 m freestyle
Gold medal – first place	2004 Indianapolis	4×100 m medley
Silver medal – second place	2006 Shanghai	4×100 m medley
Bronze medal – third place	2006 Shanghai	4×100 m freestyle
Pan Pacific Championships
Gold medal – first place	2002 Yokohama	50 m freestyle
Gold medal – first place	2002 Yokohama	4×100 m medley
Gold medal – first place	2006 Victoria	4×100 m freestyle
Gold medal – first place	2006 Victoria	4×100 m medley
Gold medal – first place	2010 Irvine	4×100 m freestyle
Silver medal – second place	1999 Sydney	4×100 m freestyle
Silver medal – second place	2006 Victoria	100 m freestyle
Silver medal – second place	2002 Yokohama	4×100 m freestyle
Universiade
Gold medal – first place	1997 Catania	4×100 m freestyle
Maccabiah Games
Gold medal – first place	2009 Israel	50 m freestyle
Gold medal – first place	2009 Israel	100 m freestyle
Gold medal – first place	2009 Israel	4×100 m freestyle
Gold medal – first place	2009 Israel	4×100 m medley

Jason Edward Lezak (born November 12, 1975) is an American former competitive swimmer and swimming executive who competed for the University of California, Santa Barbara. Lezak specialized in the 50 and 100-meter freestyle races, and represented the United States in four Olympic Games where he won eight Olympic medals.

Lezak is known for his performance at the 2008 Summer Olympics as the anchor for the United States during the men's 4×100-meter freestyle relay, where his time of 46.06 seconds was the fastest 100 m freestyle split recorded to that date. Several sports historians and journalists considered the event one of the greatest and most memorable efforts by an American relay team of that era.

Lezak has served as the general manager of the Cali Condors, which is part of the International Swimming League.

== Early life and swimming ==
Lezak was born in Irvine, California, the son of Linda (née Mann), a former elementary school science teacher, and David Lezak, a former leather goods salesman. He is Jewish. The name Lezak is pronounced Leh-Zhack and is Polish (short e). Lezak attended El Camino Real Elementary School (now Woodbury Elementary School) and Irvine High School.

Lezak trained and competed with the Irvine Novaquatics Swim Club under Dave Salo by 2000, subsequent to his collegiate swimming years. He swam with the Novaquatics during his high school years according to a few sources.

Lezak attended Irvine High School, graduating in 1994, and swam for the Irvine High School Vaquero's swimming program, a strong team under Coach Ken Dory who was in his seventh year as the team's coach in 1994. In 1993, the Irvine High swim team were Champions of the Sea View League and placed third in the CIF Division II Championship, but did not place second in the CIF Southern Section Championships until the 1998 and 1999 season and did not place first until the 2000-2001 seasons, after Lezak's tenure with the team. Lezak was twice an All American as a high school swimmer, and had finished in the top four in the CIF Section Championships in the 100 and 50-yard freestyle events.

=== UC Santa Barbara ===
Enrolling around 1995, Lezak attended the University of California, Santa Barbara, where he swam for the UC Santa Barbara Gauchos swimming and diving team from 1995 to 1998 under Gregg Wilson, who directed the Santa Barbara men's team from 1975-2015. A regional power, the UC Santa Barbara team under Wilson won the Big West Conference Swimming and Diving Championships each of the years Lezak swam with the team from 1995-1998. Lezak was an All-American swimmer at Santa Barbara, and at the 2002 NCAA Championships, set 100-yard and 50-yard national records. His 100-yard freestyle title in 2002, was his third, and he was subsequently honored as a Pac-10 Conference Swimmer of the Year. From 1996-1998, Lezak was honored in three successive years as a Big West Conference Swimmer of the Year. Lezak graduated the University in 1999 with a degree in Economics.

Lezak lives in Orange County, California with his wife, the former Danielle DeAlva, a former swimmer and Olympic medalist. The couple have 3 children, Ryan, Blake, and Layla.

== Olympic overview ==
Lezak has competed in four Olympic Games, in 2000, 2004, 2008, and 2012, and has won eight Olympic medals: two bronze, two silver, and four gold.

== 2000 Sydney Olympics ==
Lezak earned his first long-course international swimming gold medal at the 2000 Summer Olympics in Sydney, where he was part of the 4×100-meter medley relay in the Olympics in Sydney. He also won a silver medal in the 4×100-meter freestyle relay.

== 2004 Athens Olympics ==
Lezak competed in several events at the 2004 Olympic Games in Athens, Greece, and was a member of the 4×100-meter medley relay team that set a new world record and earned another gold medal at the games. Lezak also won a bronze medal in the 4×100-meter freestyle relay and finished fifth in the 50-meter freestyle.

== 2008 Beijing Olympics ==
At the 2008 Summer Olympics in Beijing, Lezak was the oldest male on the U.S. swim team. He anchored the U.S. 4×100-meter freestyle relay team that won the gold medal and set a new world record. At the start of the leg, Lezak trailed French anchor Alain Bernard by nearly a full body length. In the final 25 meters, with Bernard still leading by half a body length, Lezak overtook Bernard. The American team's final time of 3:08:24 was just 0.08 seconds ahead of the French team's 3:08.32, making it the closest finish in the event's history. Both teams finished nearly four seconds ahead of the previous world record.

Lezak earned his first individual Olympic medal, having tied for bronze with Brazilian swimmer César Cielo Filho in the 100-meter freestyle with a time of 47.67.

In the final race of these games Lezak anchored the U.S. 4×100-meter medley relay to a gold medal securing Michael Phelps's final gold medal to break Mark Spitz's record.

== 2012 London Olympics ==
Lezak qualified for his fourth Olympics at the 2012 United States Olympic Trials in Omaha, Nebraska. His sixth-place finish in the Olympic Trial finals qualified him for the London Games as a member of the U.S. 4×100-meter freestyle relay team.

At the 2012 Summer Olympics in London, United Kingdom, Jimmy Feigen, Matt Grevers, Ricky Berens and Lezak swam for the U.S. team in the preliminaries. Nathan Adrian, Michael Phelps, Cullen Jones and Ryan Lochte swam in the finals, and together all these competitors earned a silver medal for the team's second-place finish in the finals. Lezak became the first male swimmer in Olympic history to win four medals in the same event, the 4×100-meter freestyle relay.

=== Short course competitions ===
In short-course competitions, Lezak won five world championships: four relays including the 2002 4x100m freestyle and medley, and 2004 4x100m freestyle, and a gold in the 100-meter freestyle in 2004. Lezak has also won seven U.S. Championships, three times in the 50-meter freestyle and four in the 100-meter freestyle.

== Maccabiah Games ==
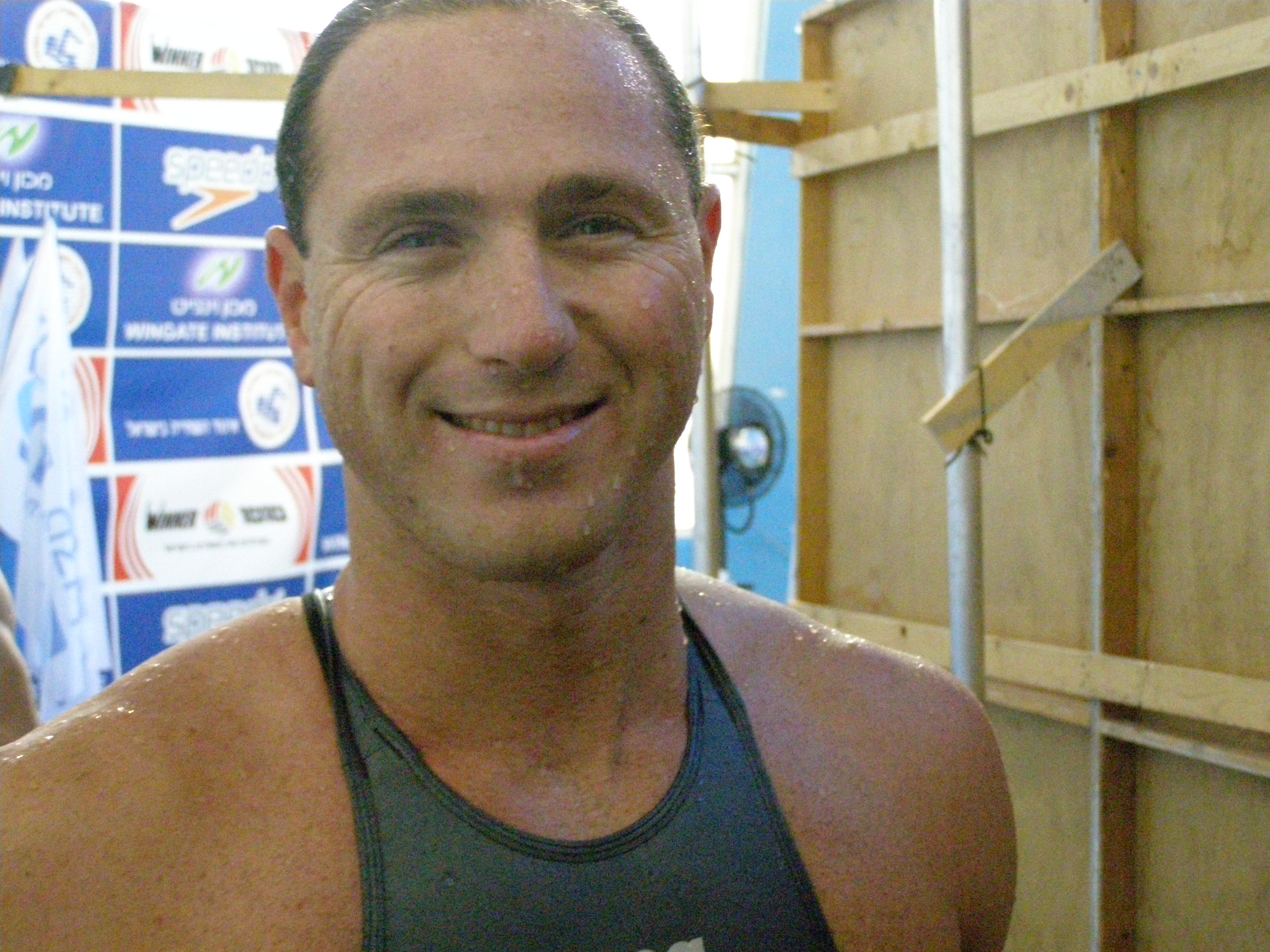
Lezak at the 2009 Maccabiah Games.

Lezak passed up on attending the 2009 World Aquatics Championships to compete in the 18th Maccabiah Games in Israel from July 12 to 29, 2009. Lezak was given the honor of lighting the Maccabiah torch at the Opening Ceremony. At the 2009 Maccabiah Games, Lezak won gold medals in the 50-meter freestyle, 100-meter freestyle, 4×100-meter freestyle relay, and 4×100-meter medley relay.

At the 2017 Maccabiah Games, in the special 4x50m relay race between Israeli and American all-star teams, American Olympic champions Lezak, Lenny Krayzelburg (four Olympic golds), and Anthony Ervin (three Olympic golds), with masters swimmer Alex Blavatnik, swam a time of 1:48.23 and defeated Israeli Olympians Guy Barnea, Yoav Bruck, Eran Groumi, and Tal Stricker, who had a time of 1:51.25.

== Executive career ==
Lezak serves as the general manager for the Cali Condors which is part of the International Swimming League. In 2019 the inaugural year of the league the Condors finished third place in the finals. As the top finishing American team, the Condors were led by high scorers Caeleb Dressel and Lilly King.

== Personal bests ==
His personal bests (long-course) are:

- 50 m freestyle: 21.90
- 100 m freestyle: 47.58 (former American record)

== Accolades ==
In 2003 he was inducted into the Southern California Jewish Sports Hall of Fame. In 2006 he was inducted into the International Jewish Sports Hall of Fame.

== See also ==
- List of select Jewish swimmers
- List of multiple Olympic gold medalists
- List of multiple Olympic gold medalists in one event
- List of multiple Summer Olympic medalists
- List of Olympic medalists in swimming (men)
- List of United States records in swimming
- List of World Aquatics Championships medalists in swimming (men)
- List of world records in swimming
- World record progression 4 × 100 metres freestyle relay
- World record progression 4 × 100 metres medley relay
