= Military ranks of Albania =

The Military ranks of Albania are the military insignia used by the Albanian Armed Forces.

== Current ranks (since 2011) ==
=== Commissioned officer ranks ===
The rank insignia of commissioned officers.

| NATO code | OF-10 | OF-9 | OF-8 | OF-7 | OF-6 | OF-5 | OF-4 | OF-3 | OF-2 | OF-1 |
|---|---|---|---|---|---|---|---|---|---|---|---|
| Albanian Land Force |
| Albanian Land Force | | | Gjeneral lejtant | Gjeneral major | Gjeneral brigade | Kolonel | Nënkolonel | Major | Kapiten | Toger | Nëntoger |
| Albanian Naval Force |
| Albanian Naval Force | | | Admiral | Nënadmiral | Kundëradmiral | Kapiten rangut I | Kapiten rangut II | Kapiten rangut III | Kapiten lejtnant | Lejtnant | Nënlejtnant |
| Albanian Air Force |
| Albanian Air Force | | | Gjeneral lejtant | Gjeneral major | Gjeneral brigade | Kolonel | Nënkolonel | Major | Kapiten | Toger | Nëntoger |
| NATO code | OF-10 | OF-9 | OF-8 | OF-7 | OF-6 | OF-5 | OF-4 | OF-3 | OF-2 | OF-1 |

=== Other ranks ===
The rank insignia of non-commissioned officers and enlisted personnel.

| NATO code | OR-9 | OR-8 | OR-7 | OR-6 | OR-5 | OR-4 | OR-3 | OR-2 | OR-1 |
|---|---|---|---|---|---|---|---|---|---|
| Albanian Land Force |
| Albanian Land Force | Kryekapter | Kapter | Rreshter | Tetar | Nëntetar | Ushtar IV | Ushtar III | Ushtar II | Ushtar I |
| Albanian Naval Force |
| Albanian Naval Force | Kryekapter | Kapter | Rreshter | Tetar | Nëntetar | Ushtar IV | Ushtar III | Ushtar II | Ushtar I |
| Albanian Air Force |
| Albanian Air Force | Kryekapter | Kapter | Rreshter | Tetar | Nëntetar | Ushtar IV | Ushtar III | Ushtar II | Ushtar I |
| NATO code | OR-9 | OR-8 | OR-7 | OR-6 | OR-5 | OR-4 | OR-3 | OR-2 | OR-1 |

== History ==
Albanian military insignia have undergone several periods during which their design changed radically.

The first ranks in the Albanian Armed Forces were formed in 1926 during the reign of King Zog I. His rule comprises two periods, the "Austrian" (1929-1936) and the "Prussian (generals) + Italian (other ranks)" style (1936-1939) of insignia.

During the time of Italian and German occupations of Albania their respective ranks were worn on Albanian militia uniforms.

After the Second World War, when the communist regime took power, military ranks were radically changed in looks and in naming. In the first years officers and generals wore sleeve insignia whose order was loosely based on that time's Yugoslav patterns. In 1947 a new model was introduced (both in Albania and Yugoslavia), where insignia and ranks came from the Soviet Union. This followed the traditions of Stalin's last years where insignia of all the Communist Bloc countries tended to uniformity. While most socialist countries abandoned this model soon after Stalin's death, Albania preserved it until May 1966, when military ranks were abolished altogether following Chinese example and based on doctrines of guerilla warfare.

With the fall of the communist regime the military ranks were re-established in 1991 following a Western model. However, there were several crucial changes in their design (1991, 2004 and 2011) and a few minor ones.

=== 1966–1991 ===
On 22 April 1966, the military ranking system of the Armed forces of the People's Republic of Albania, was officially abolished by the order nr. 0227 "Mbi heqjen e gradave" of the Minister of People's Defence, Beqir Balluku, in accordance with the Nr. 4113 decree edicted by the Presidium of the People's Assembly on 7 March 1966.

=== 1991–1999 ===
Officer

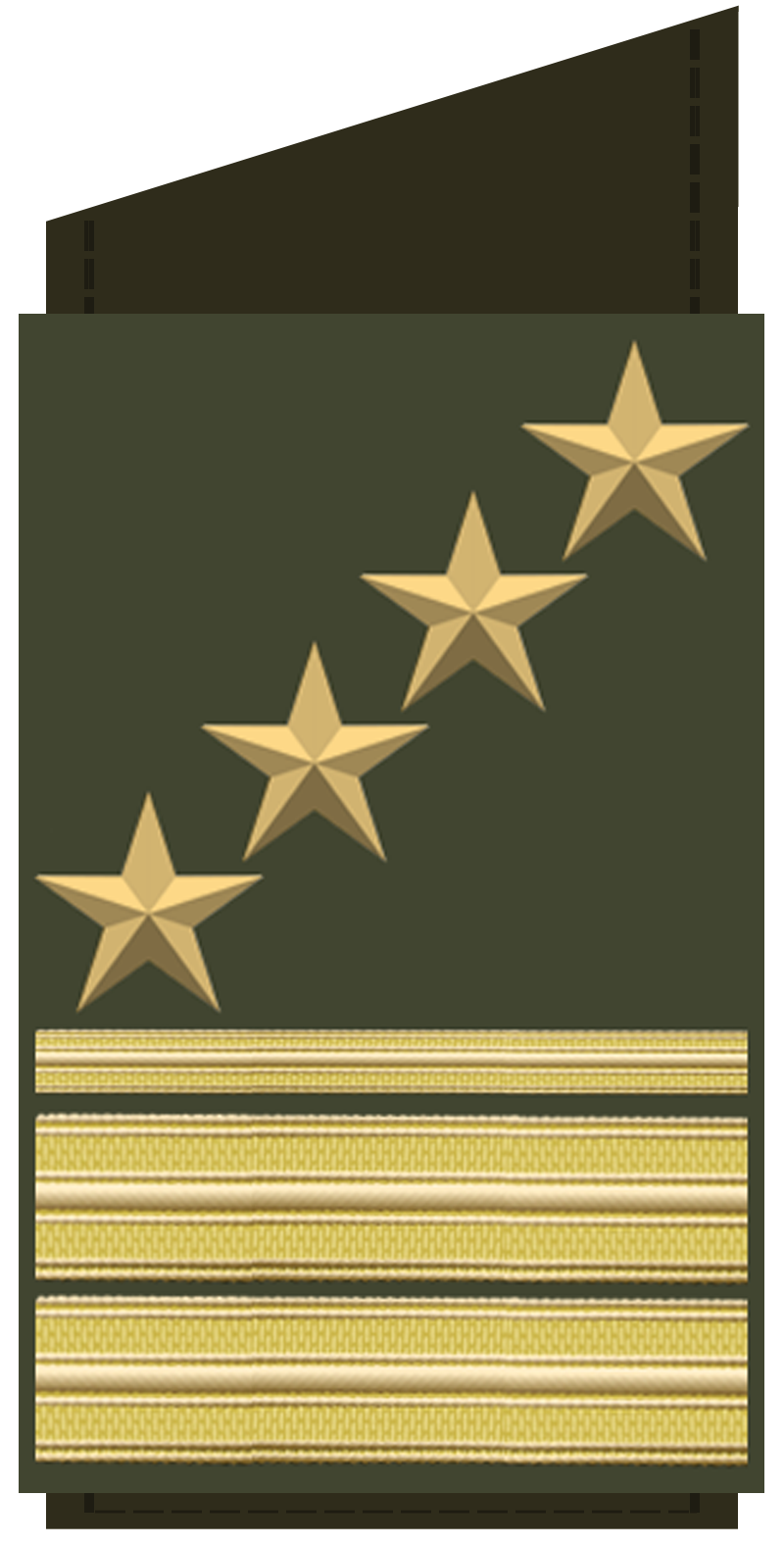
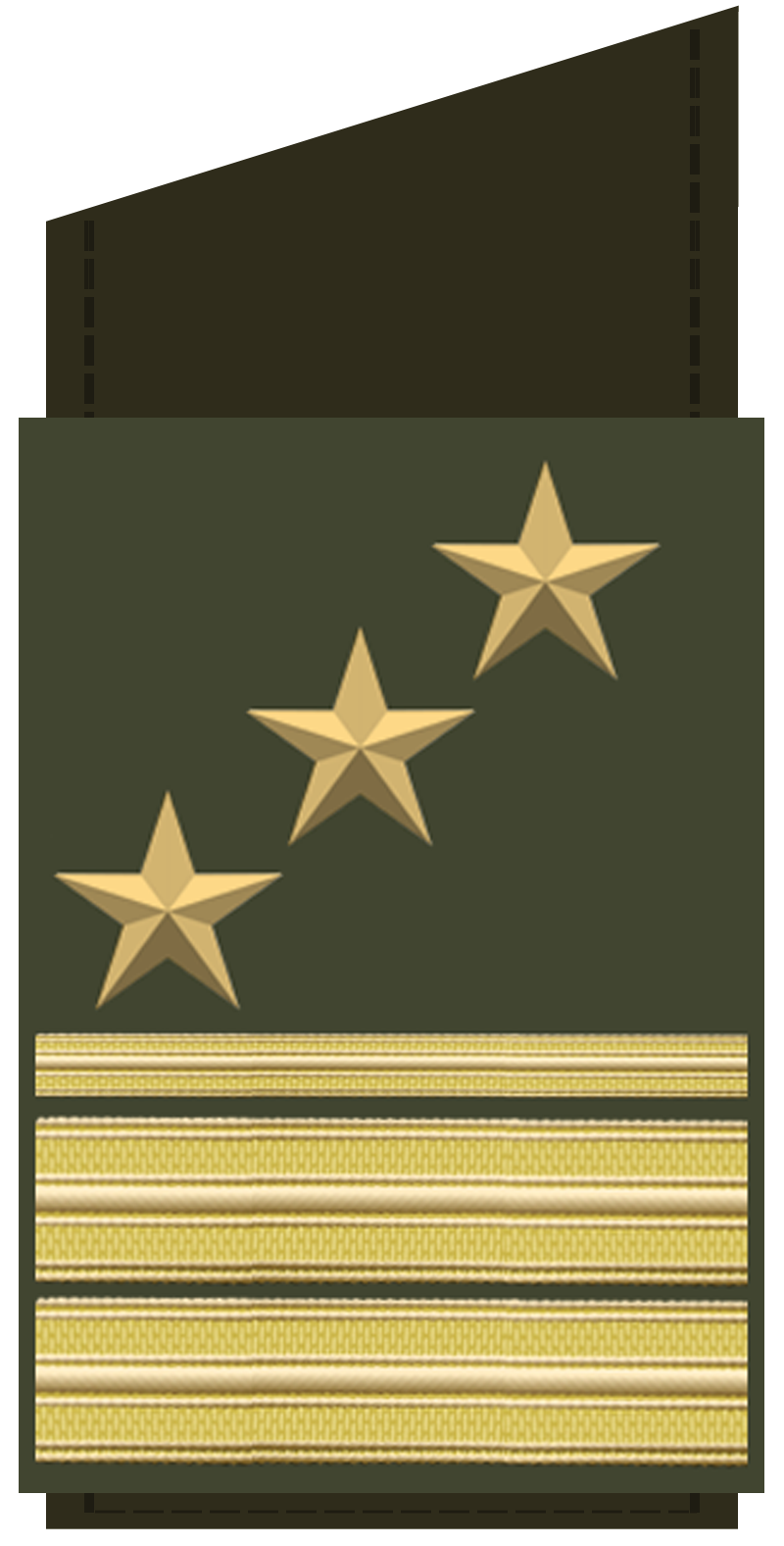
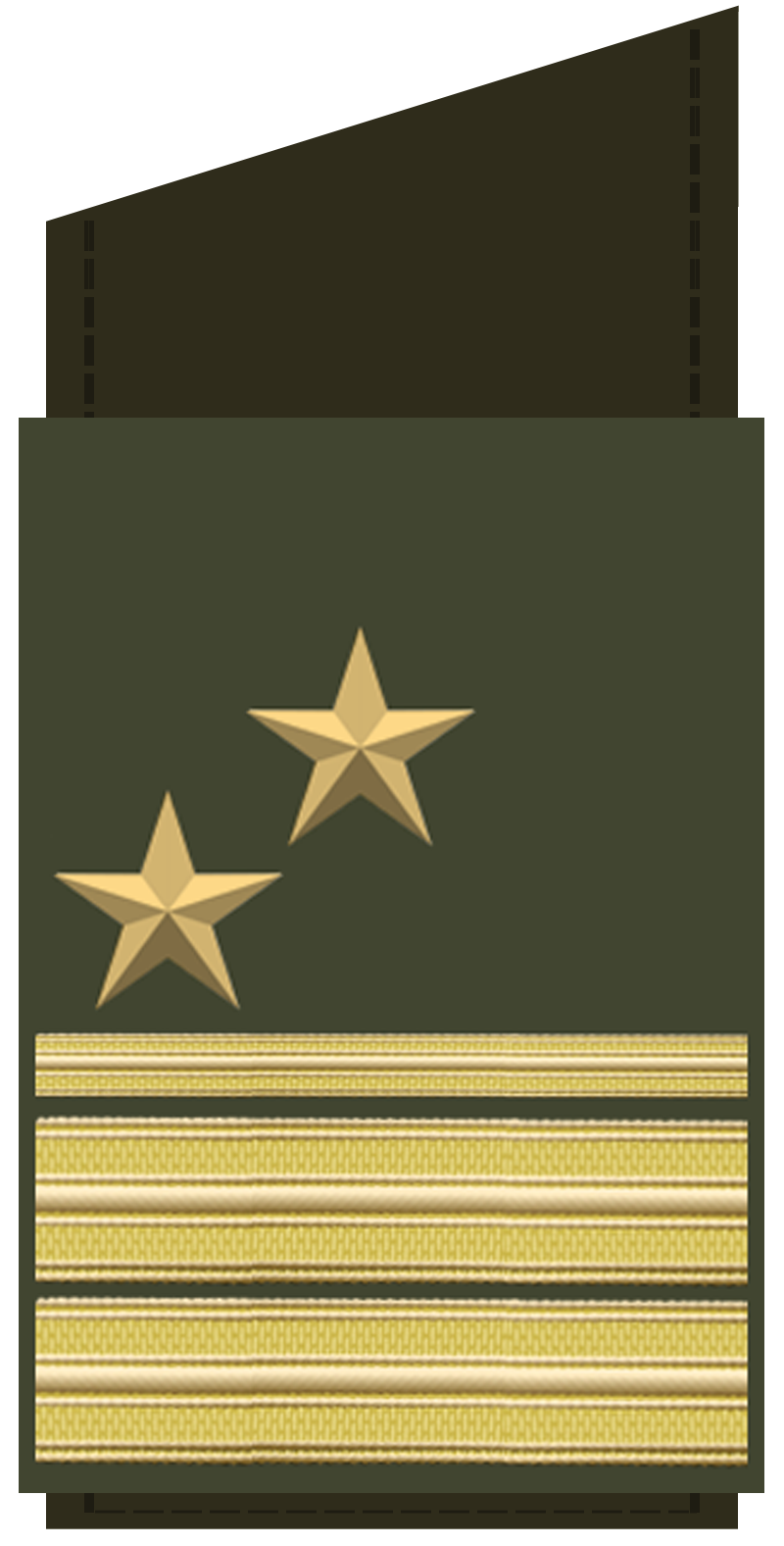
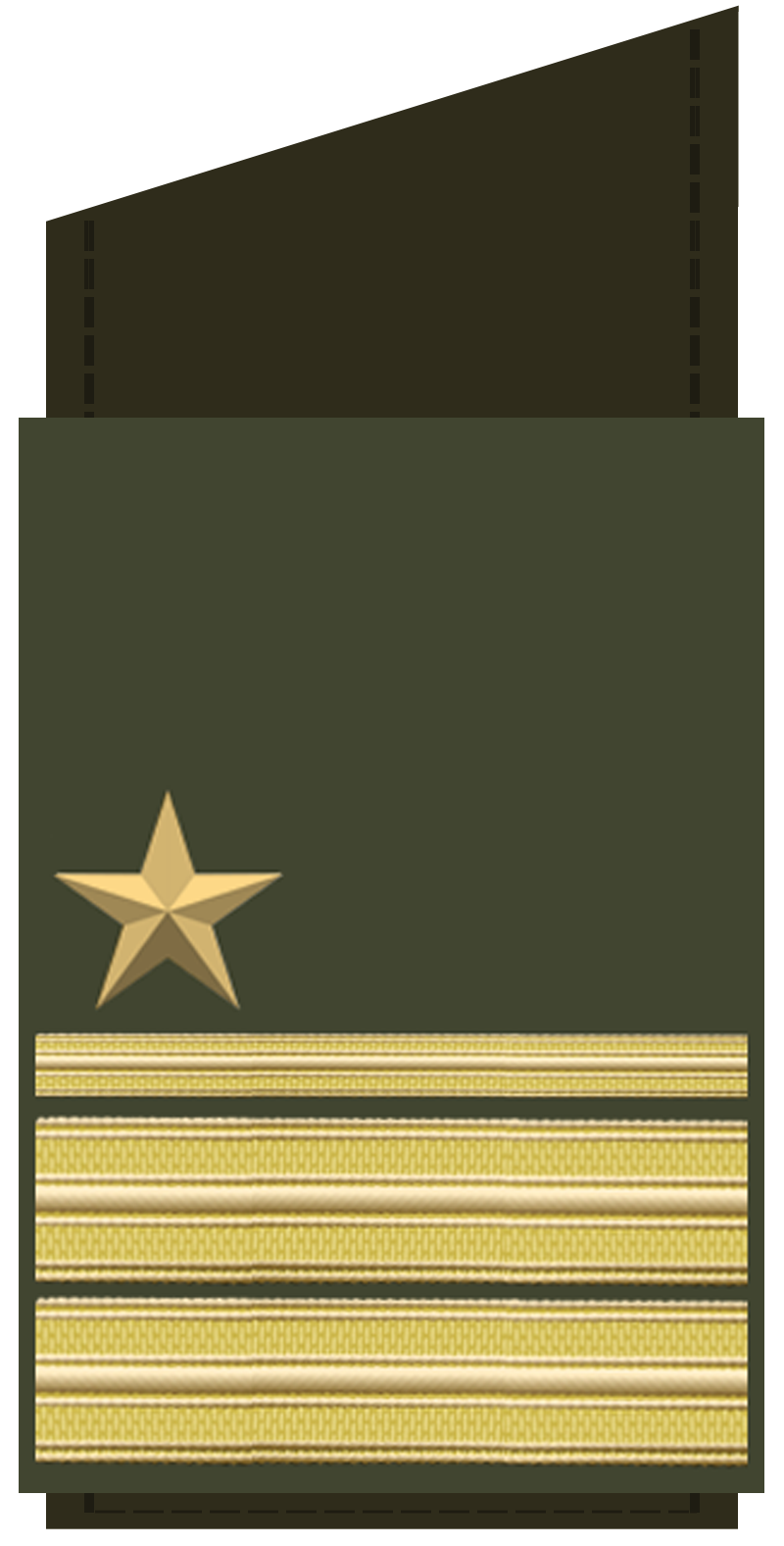
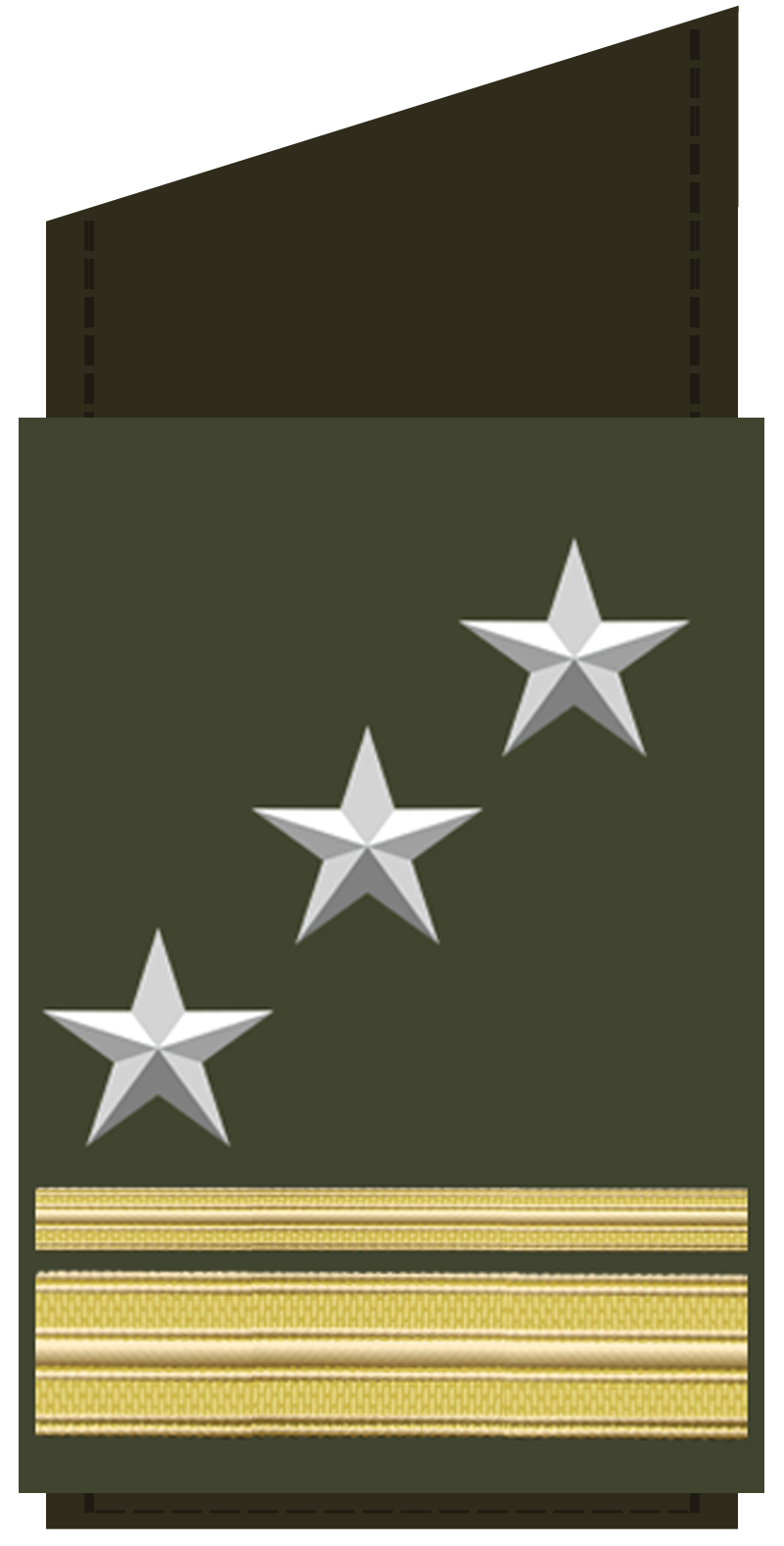
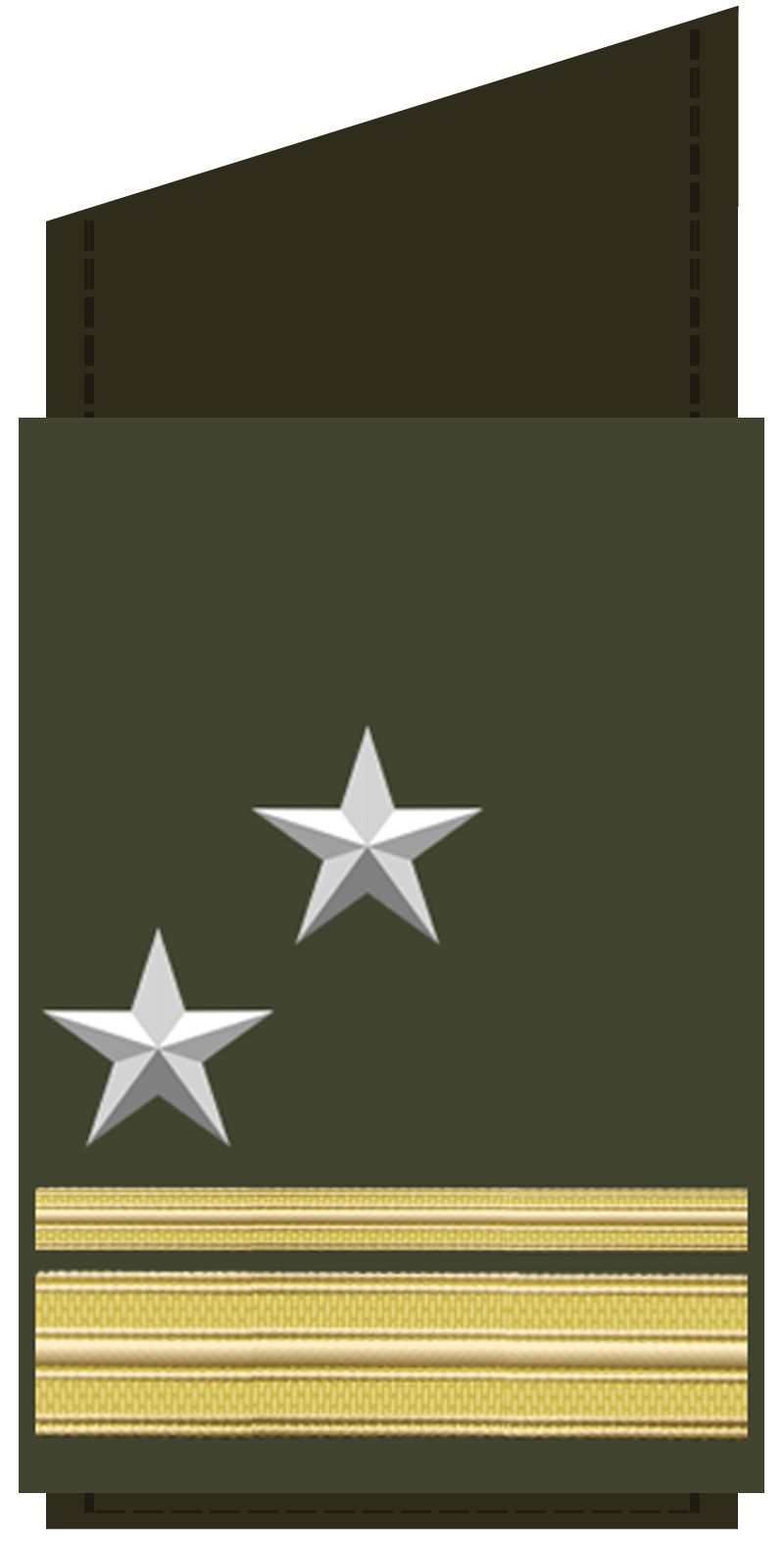
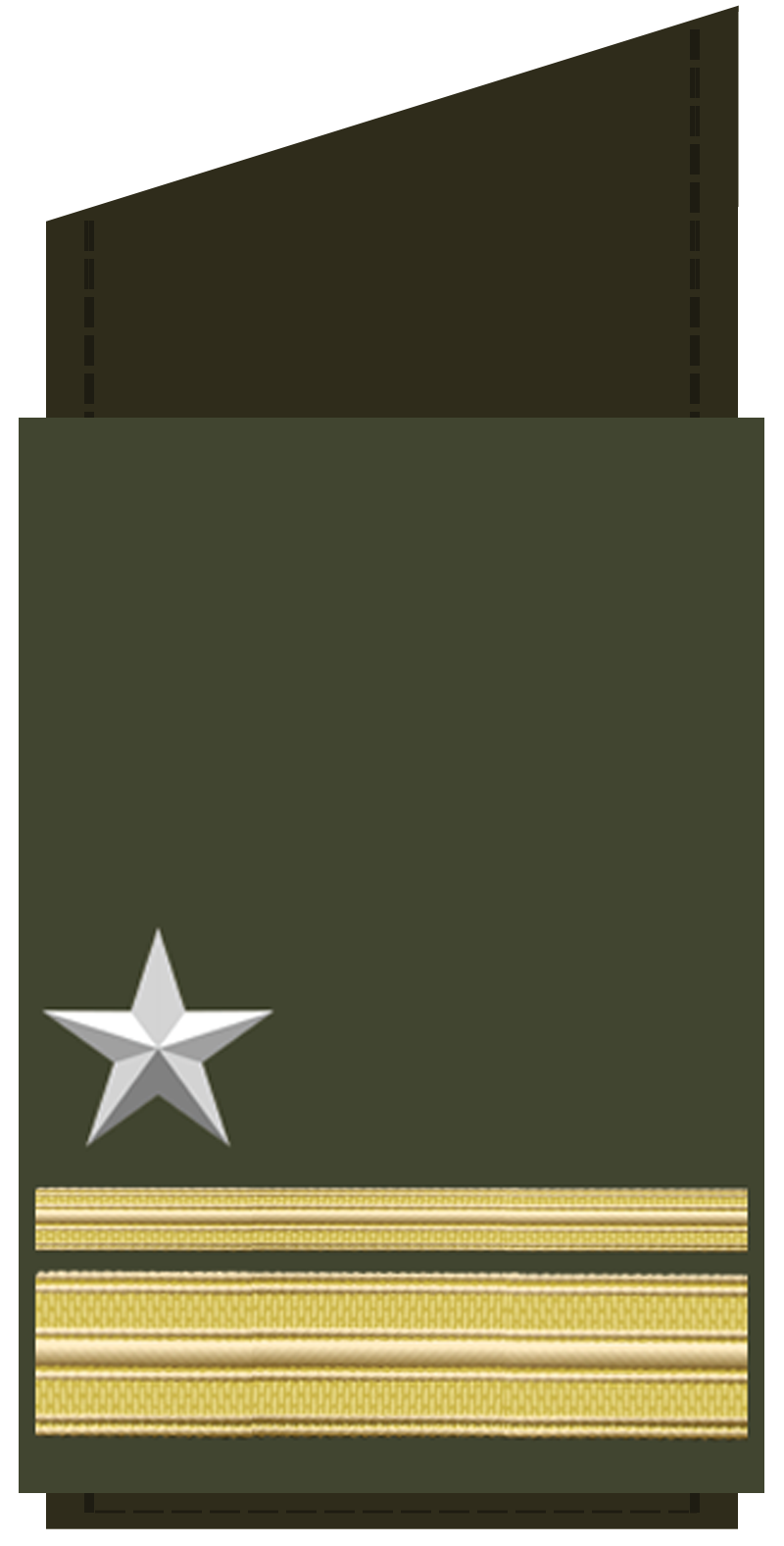
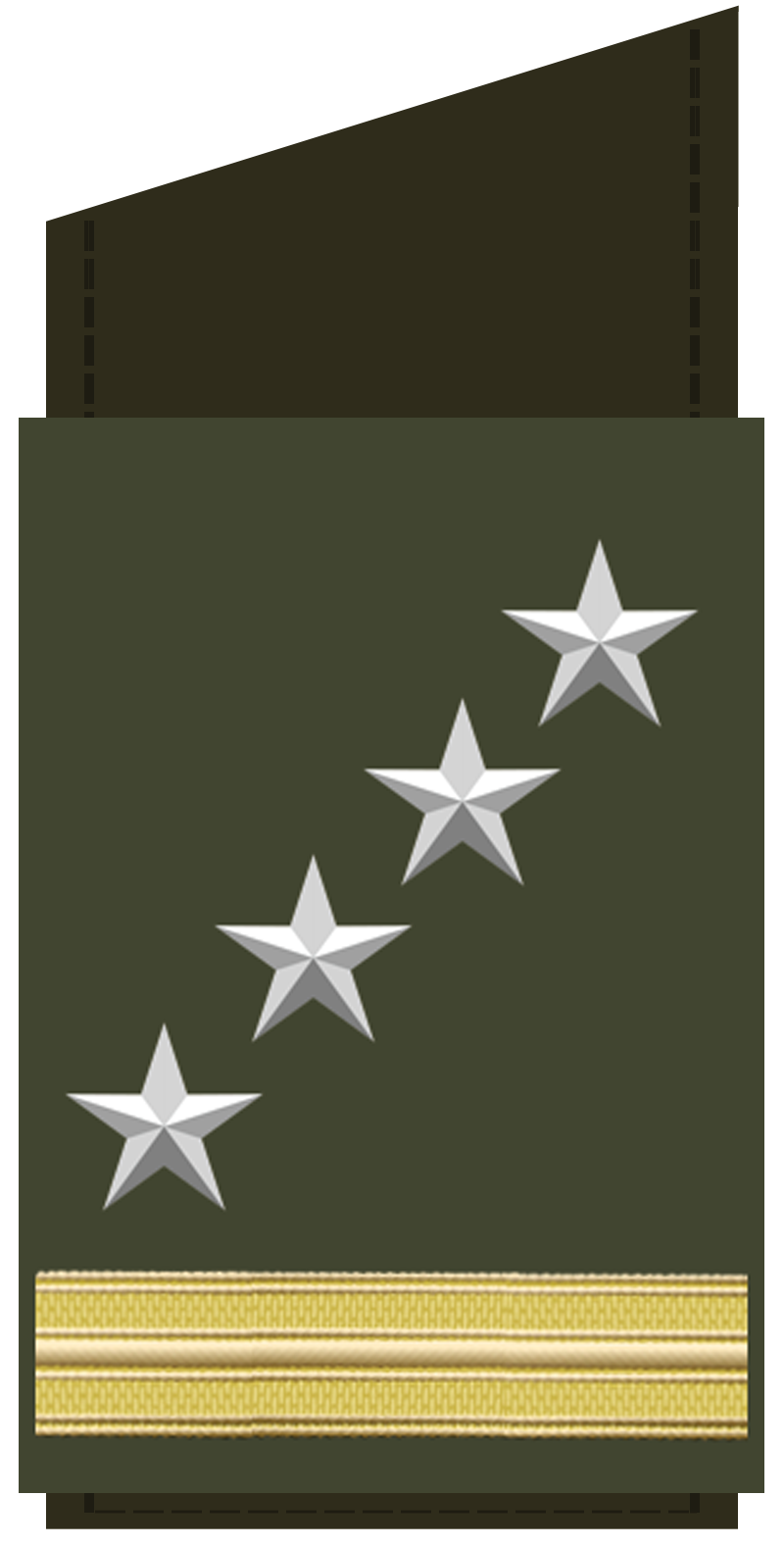
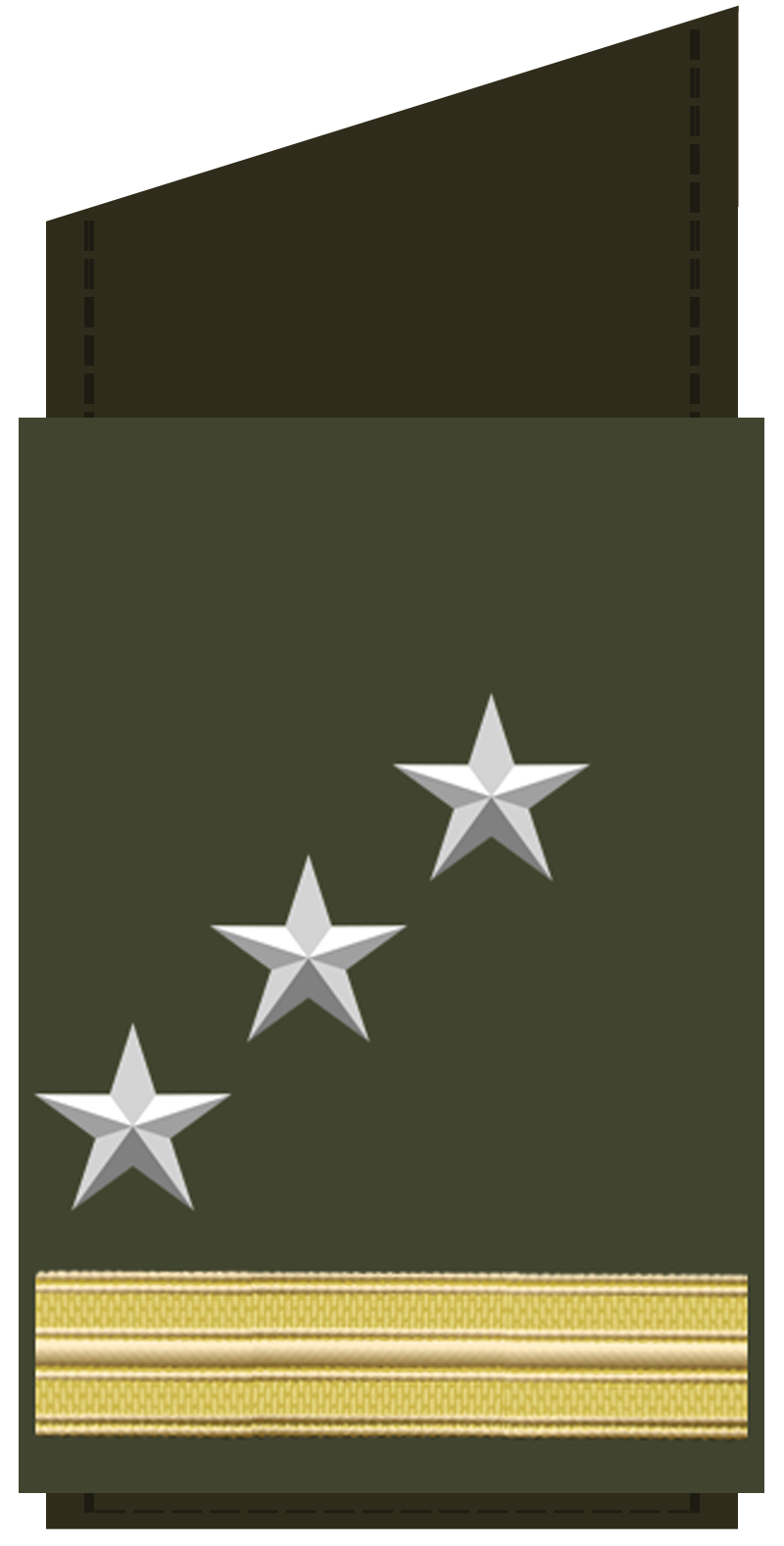
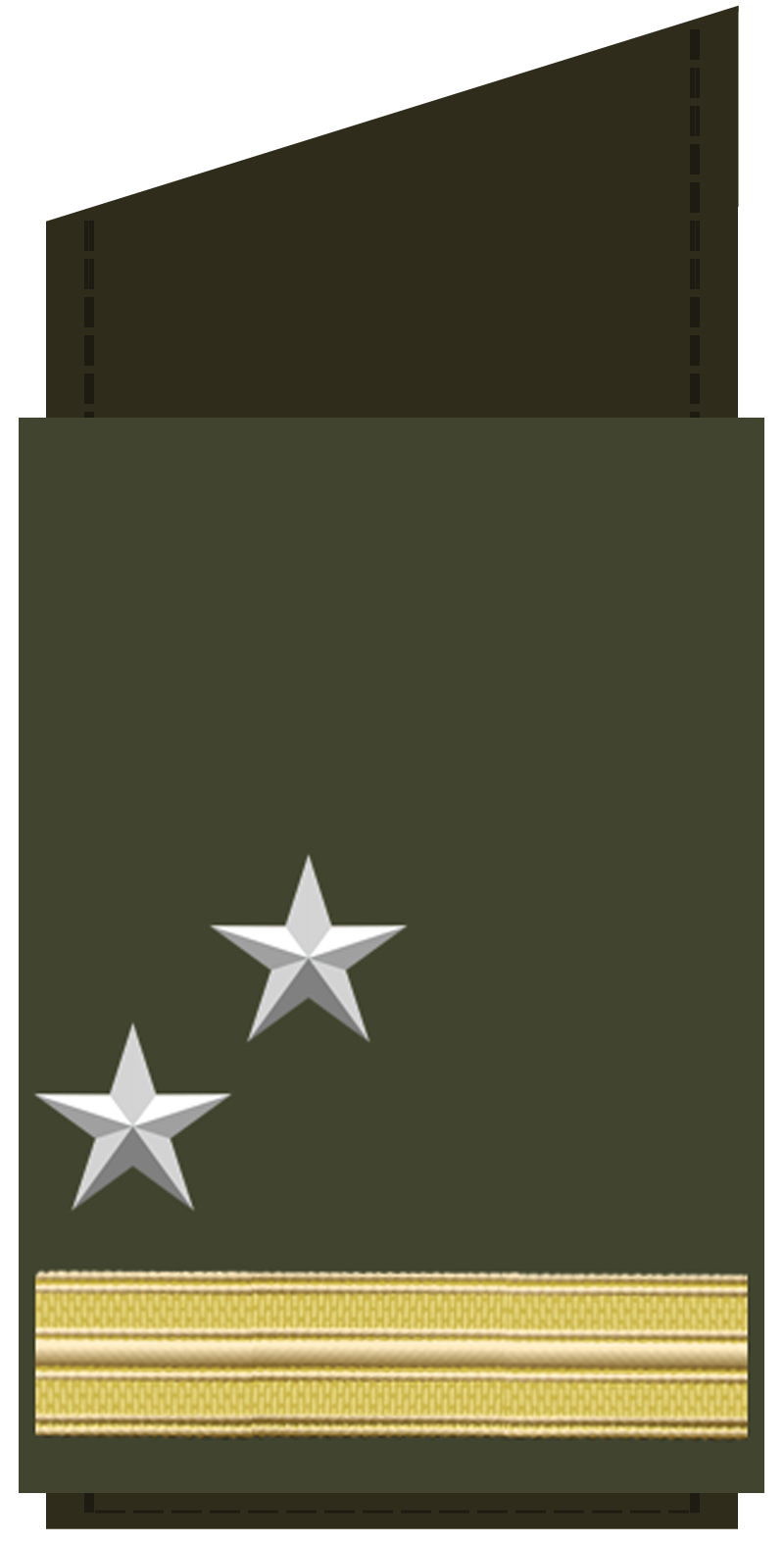
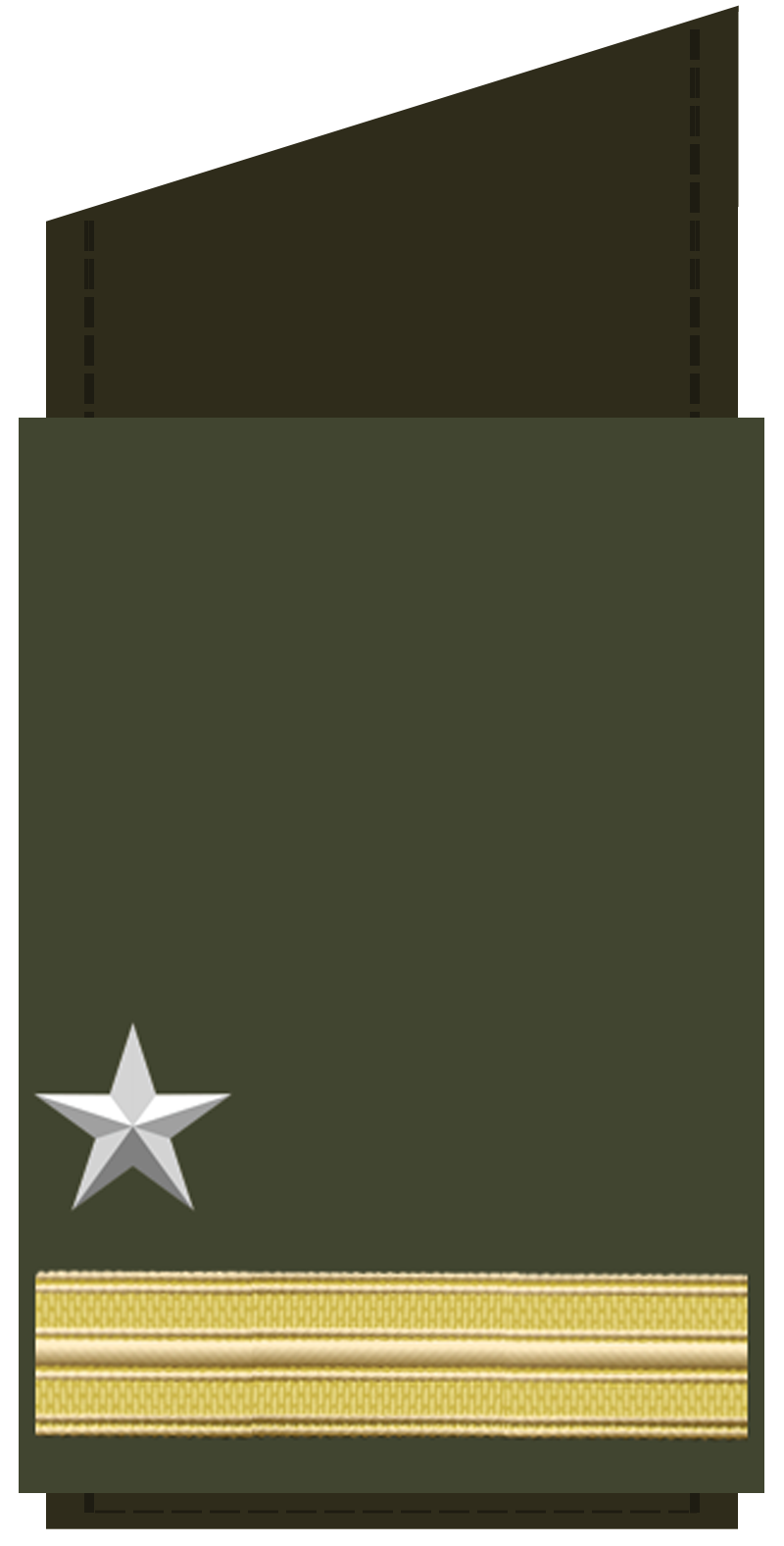
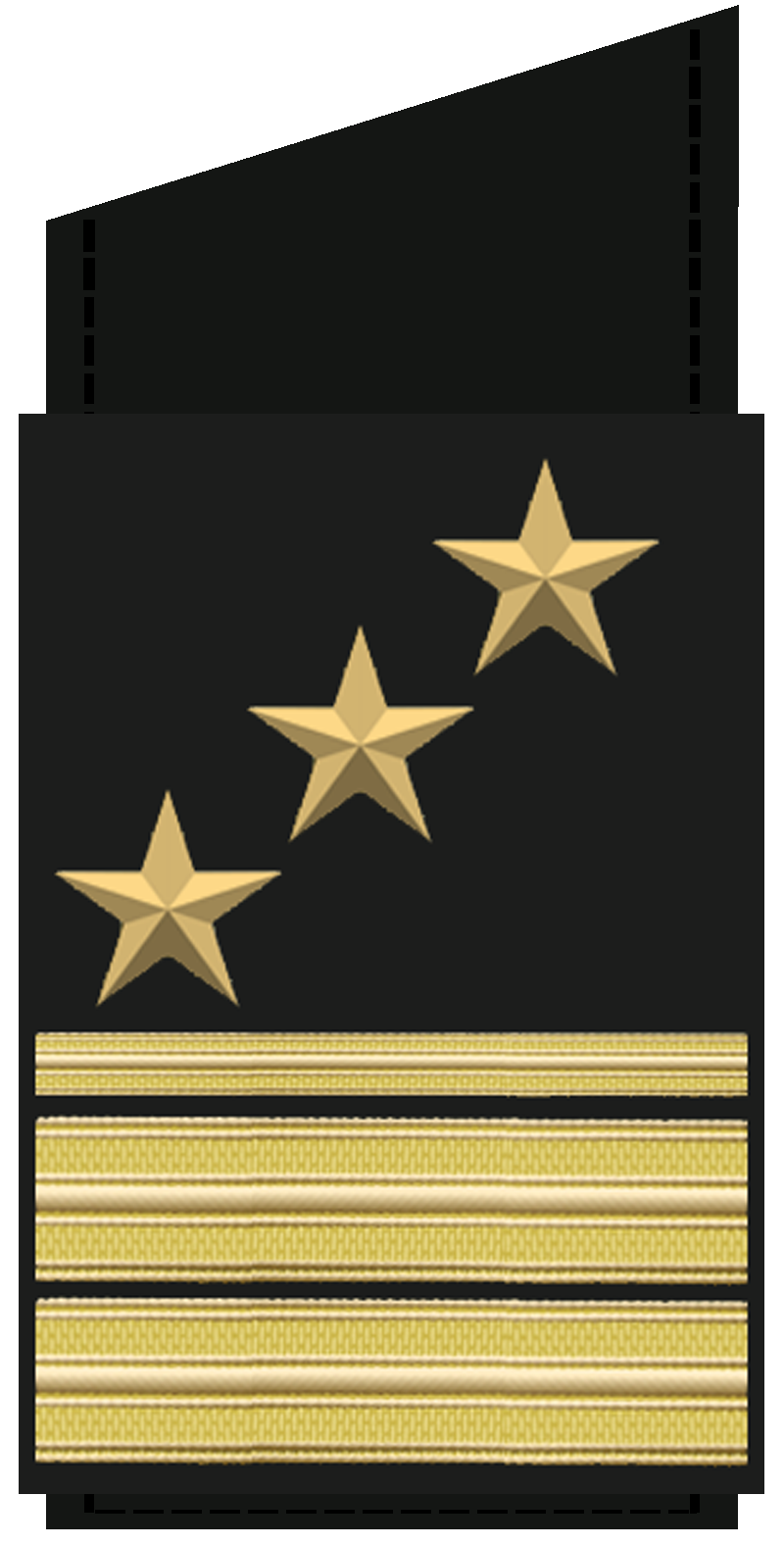
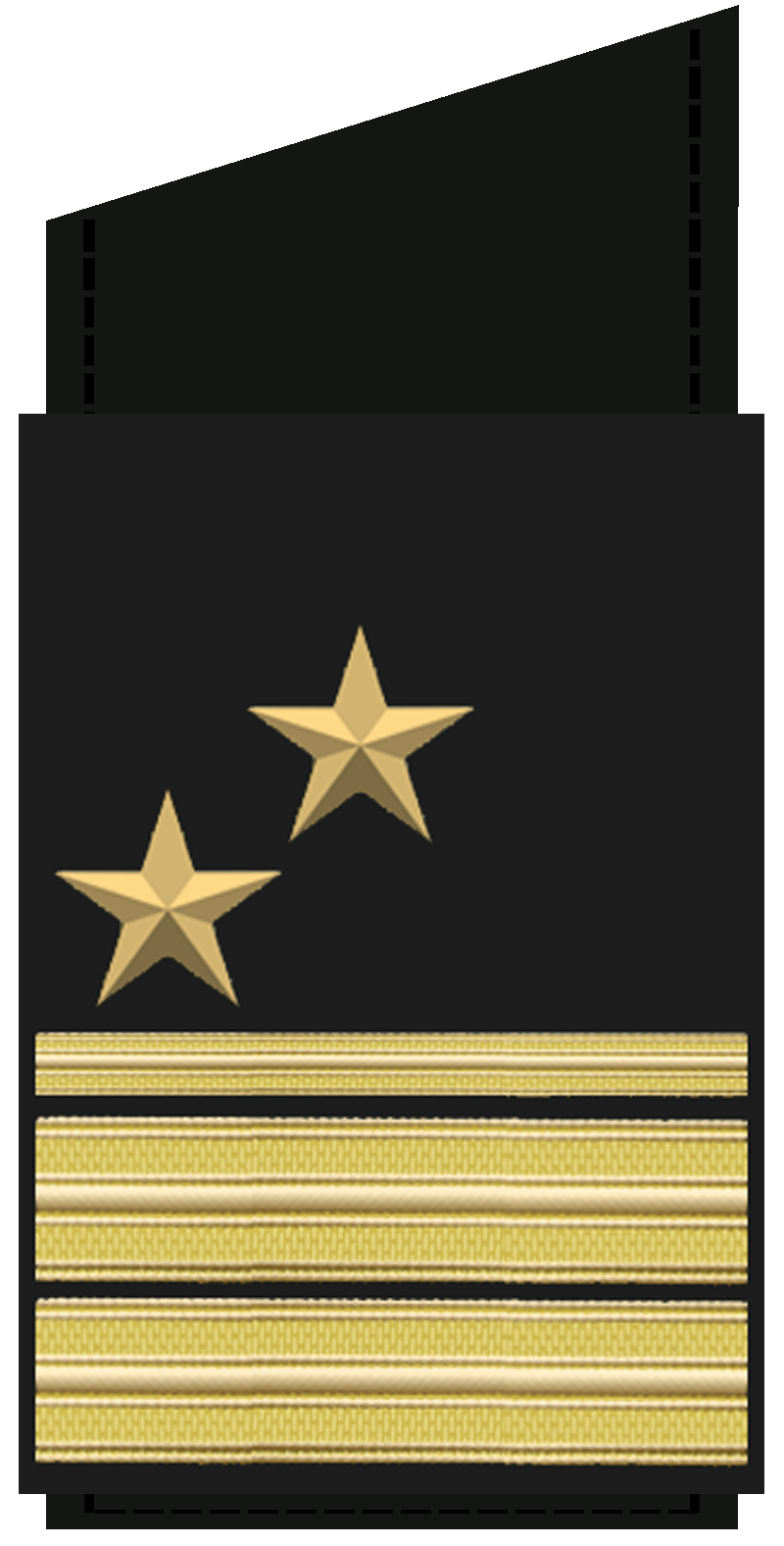
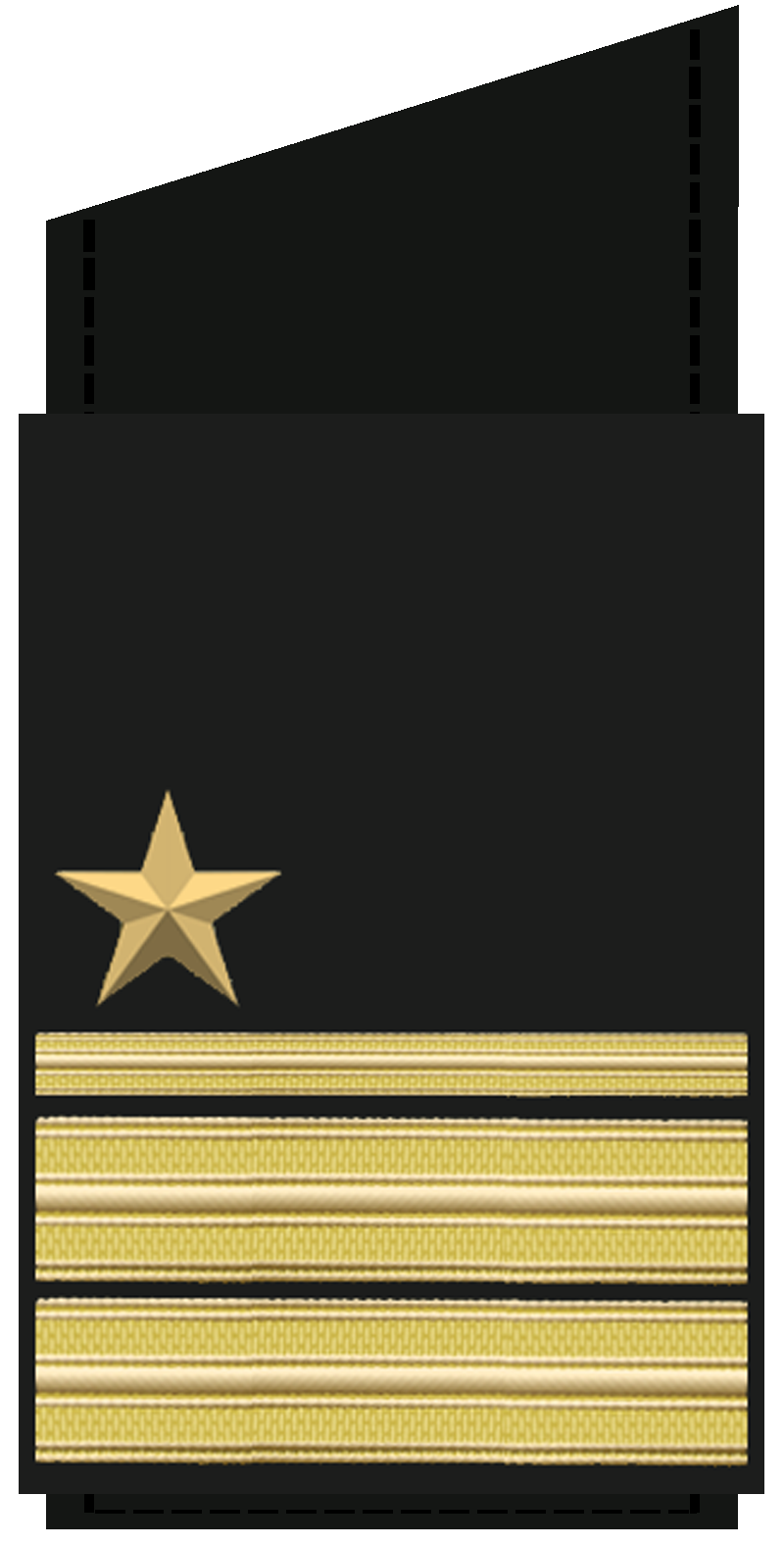
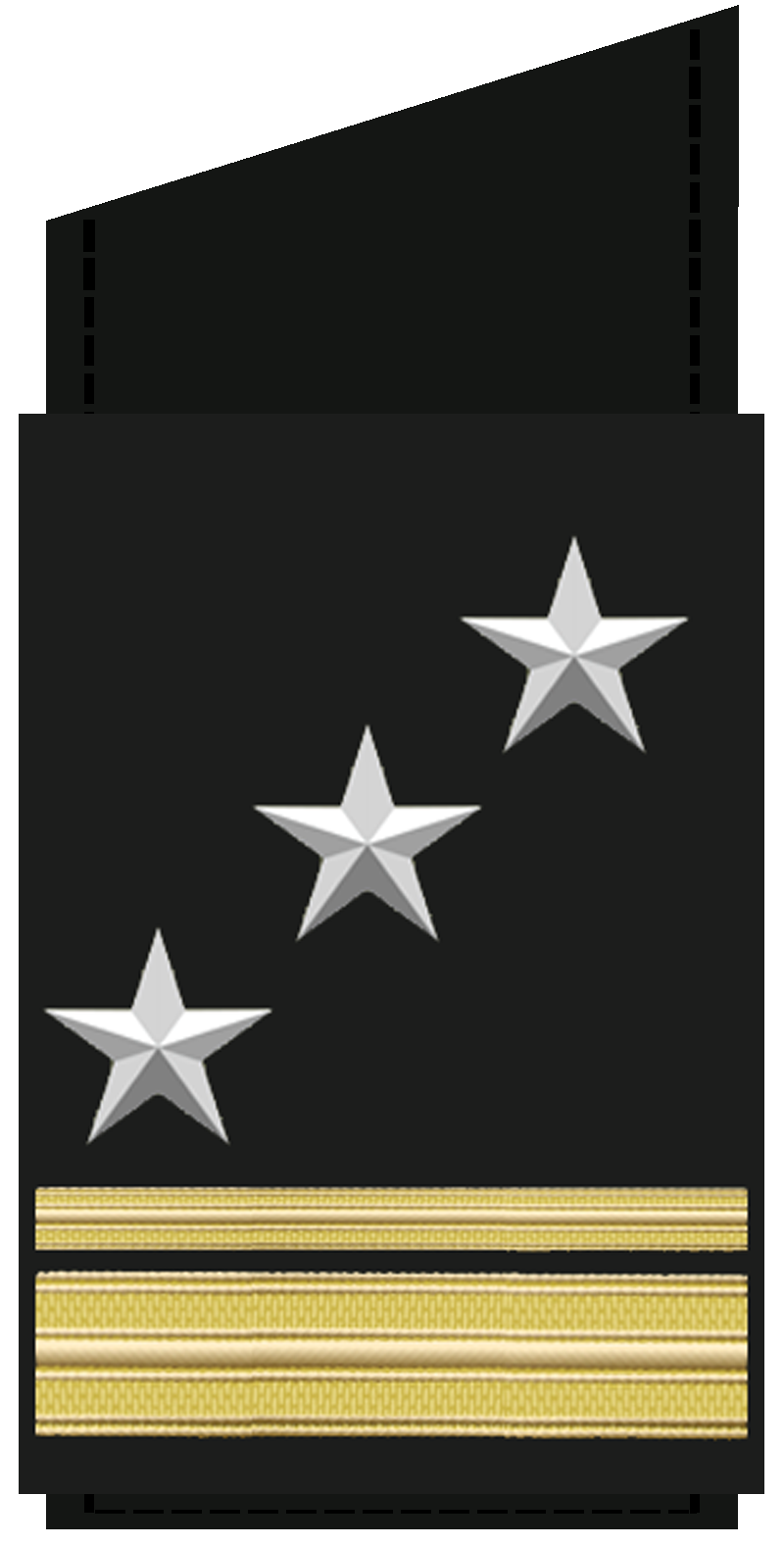
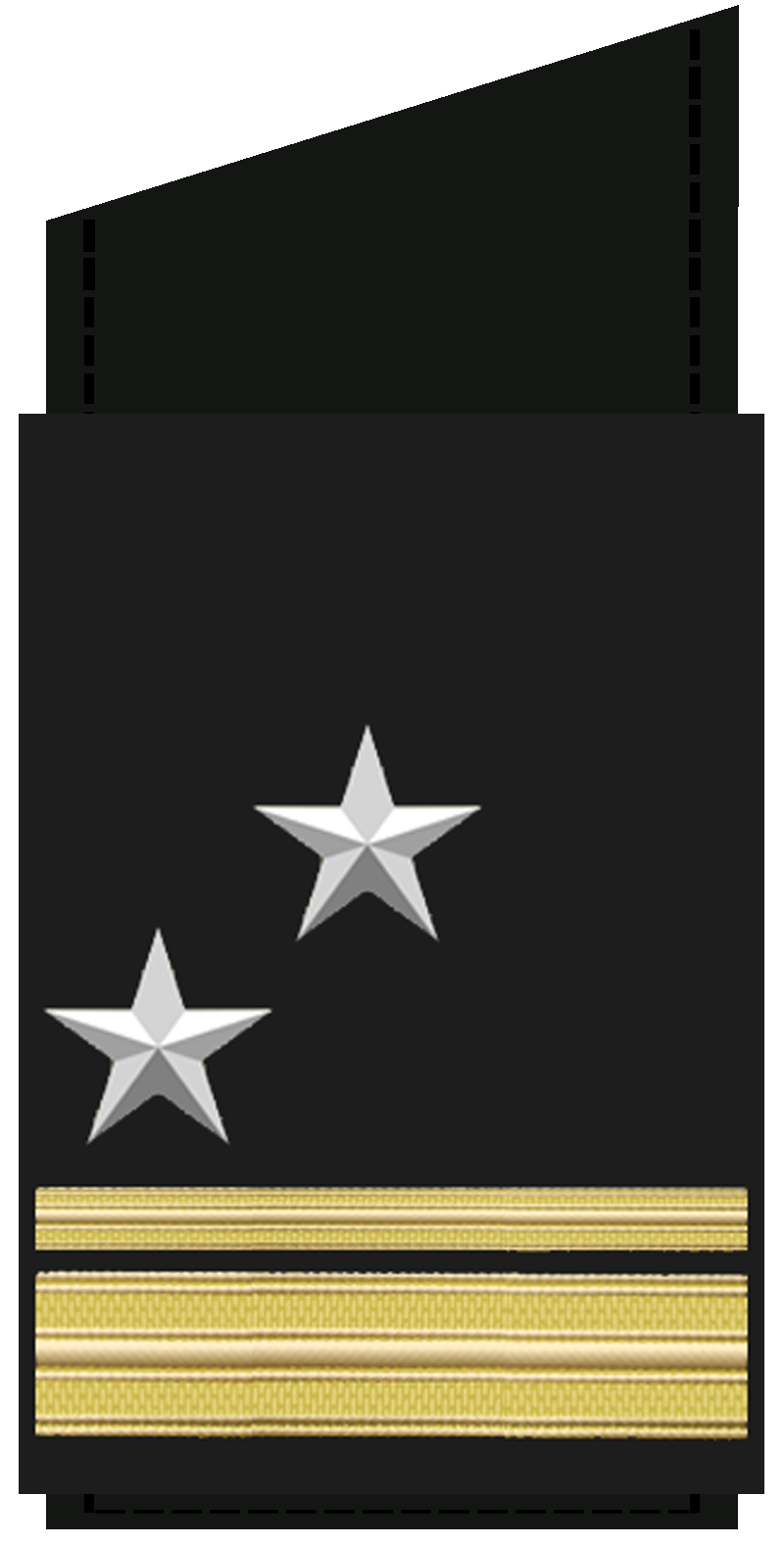
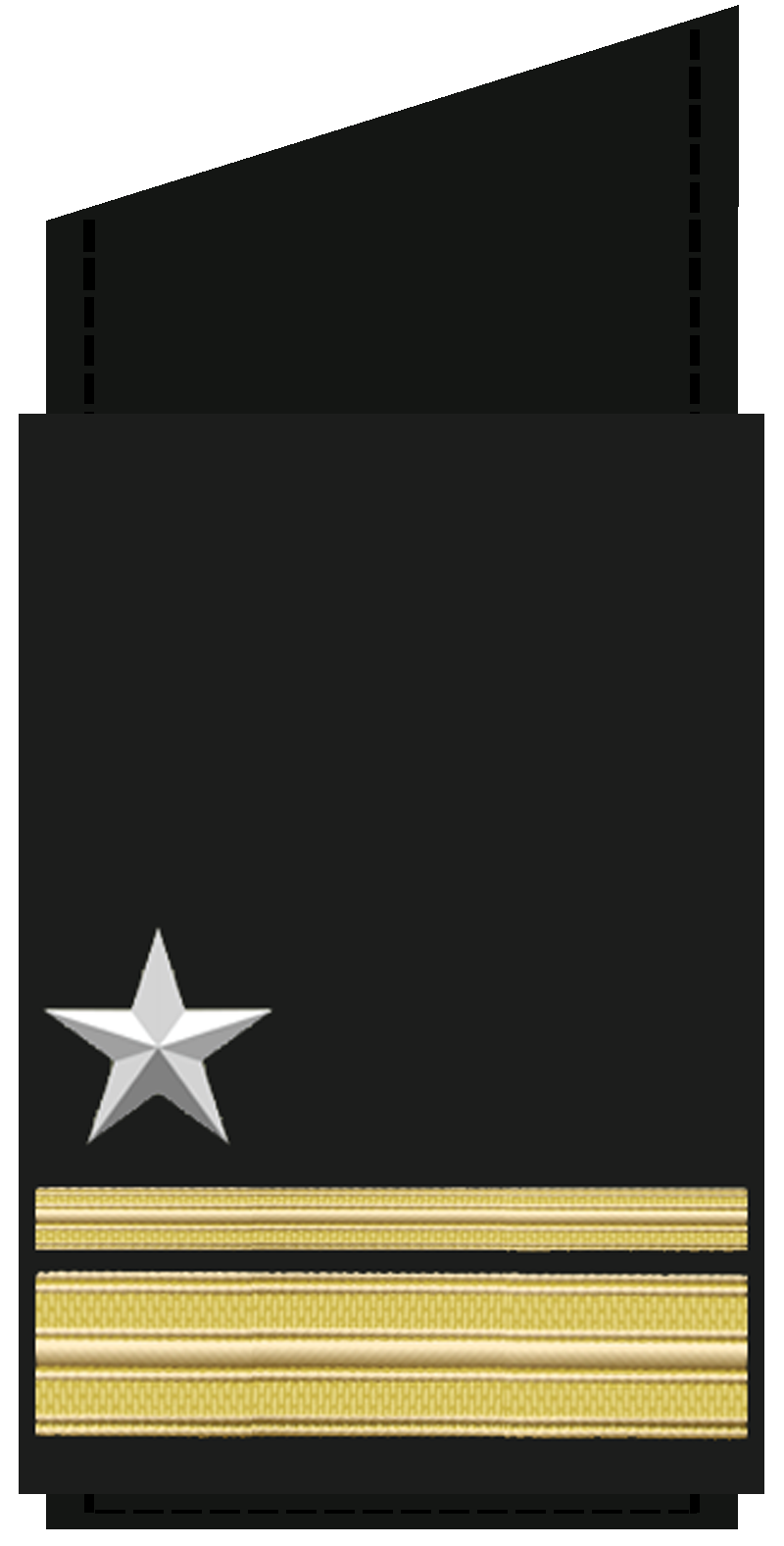
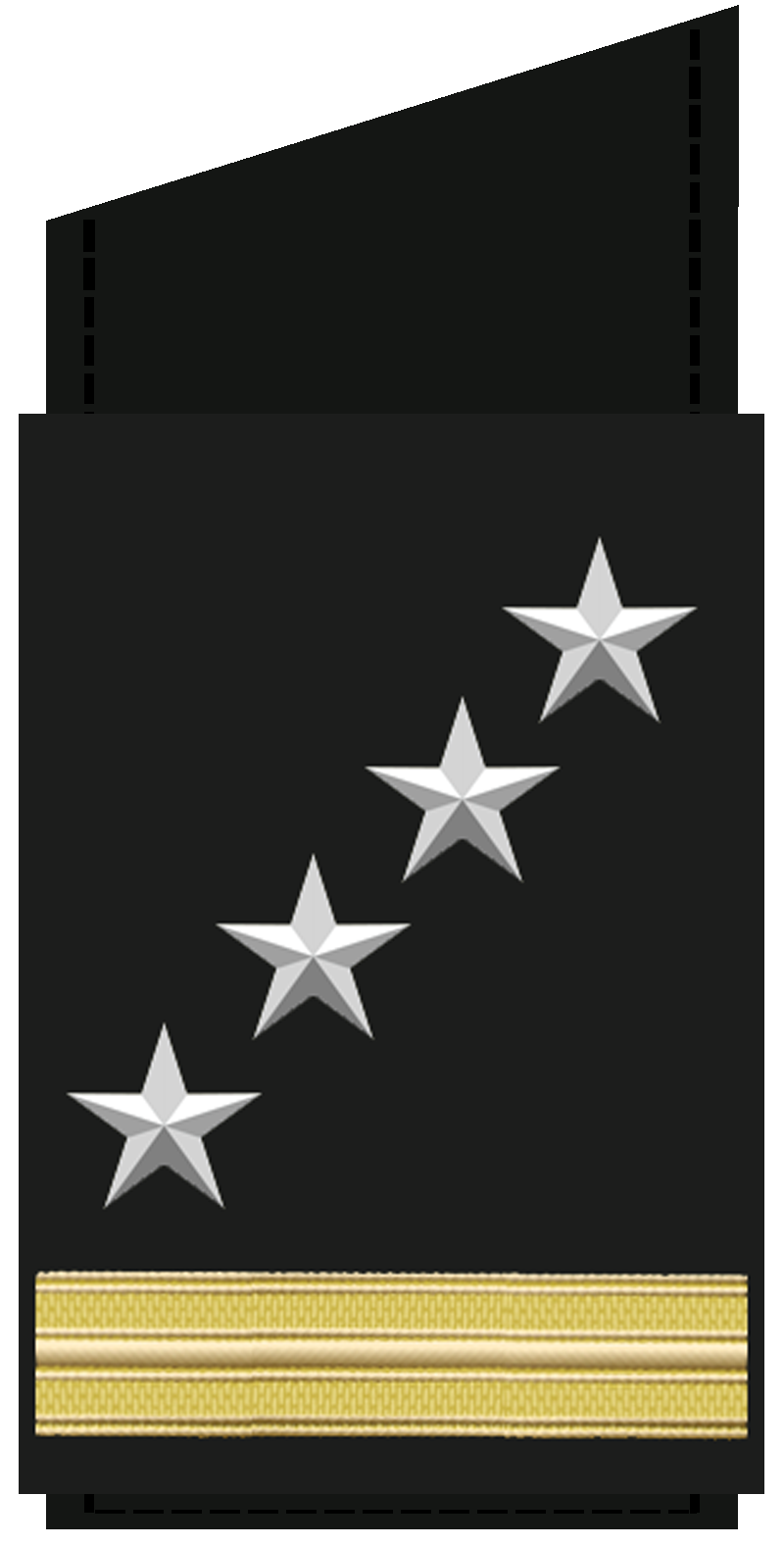
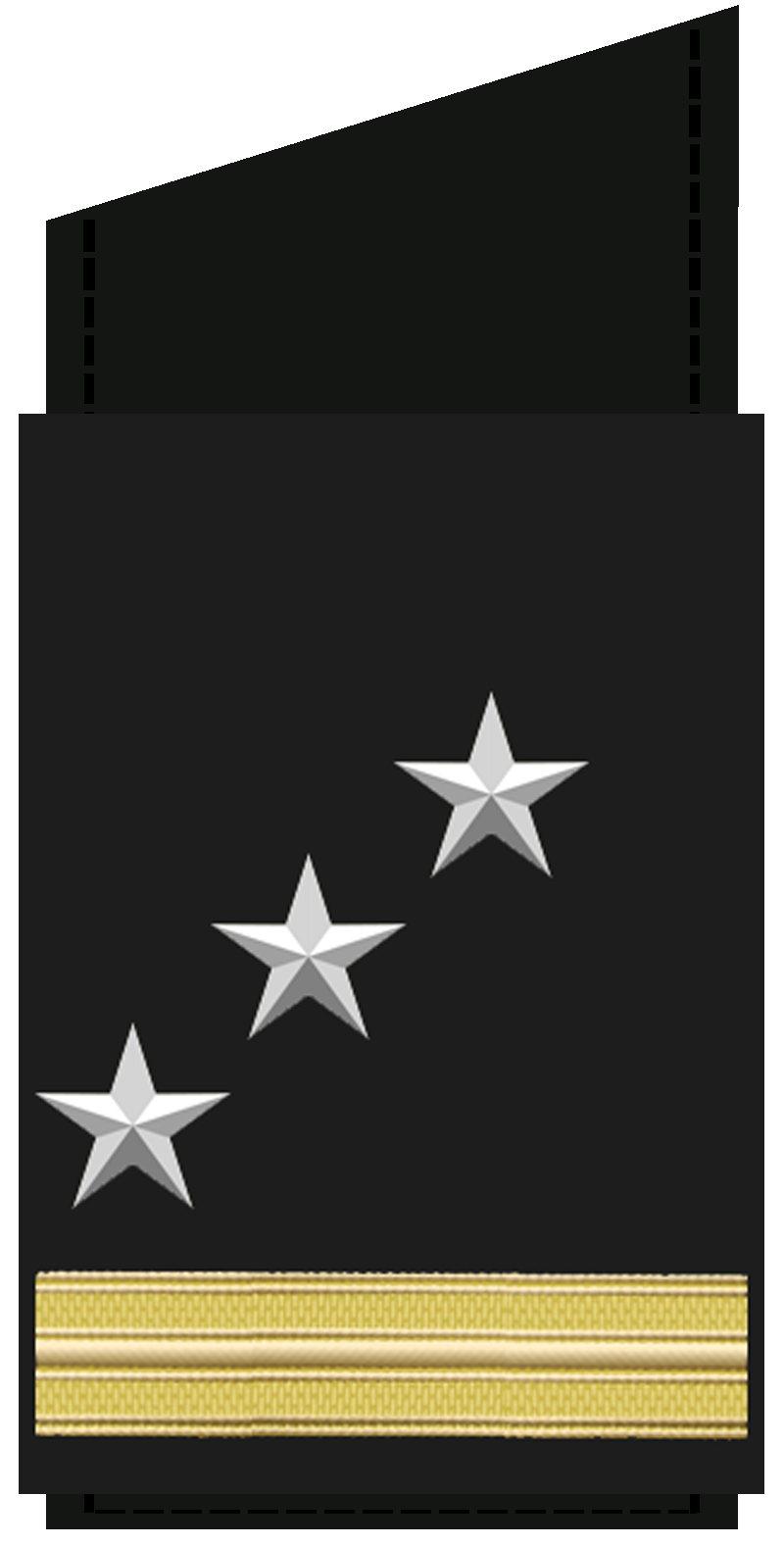
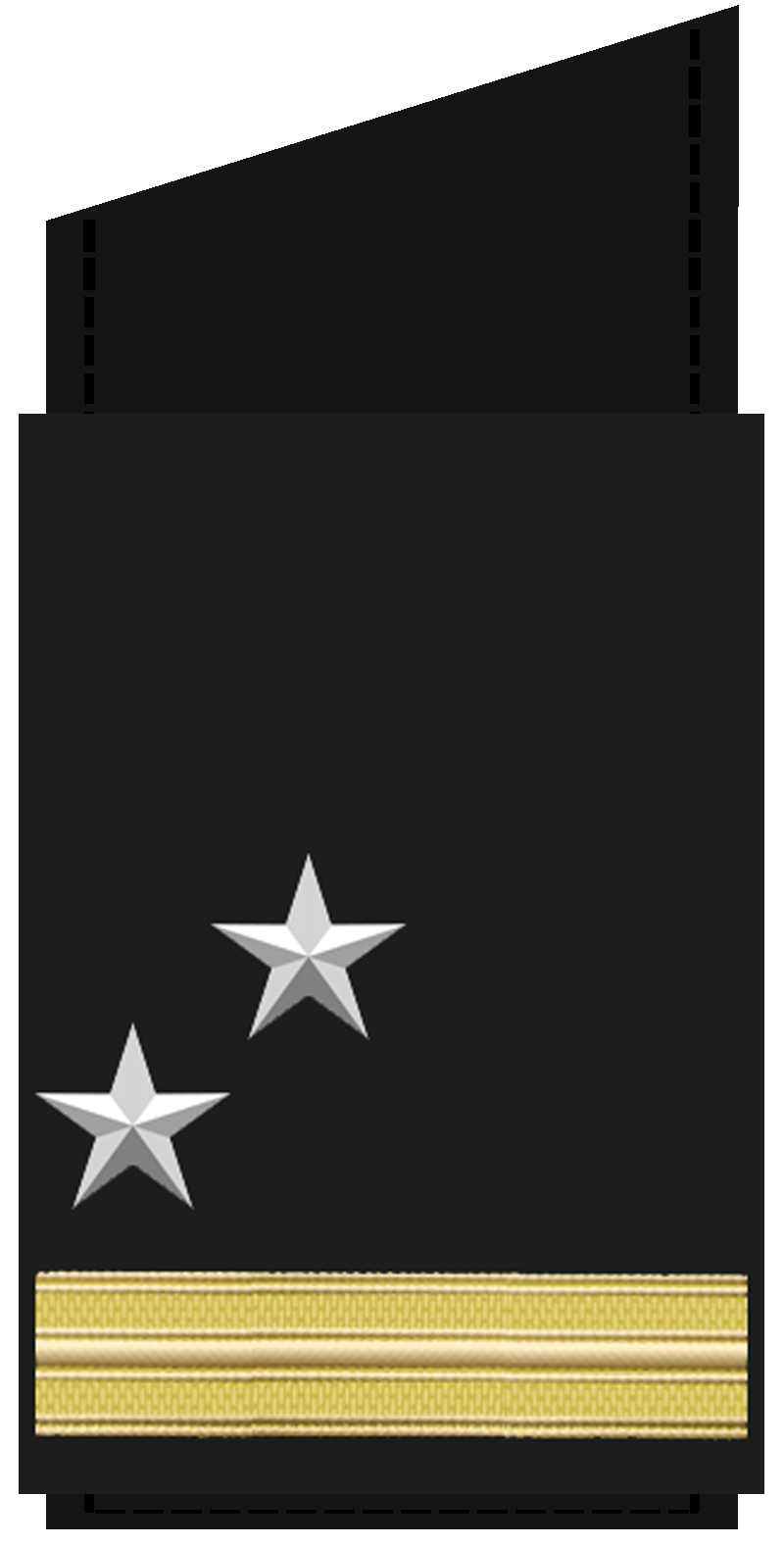
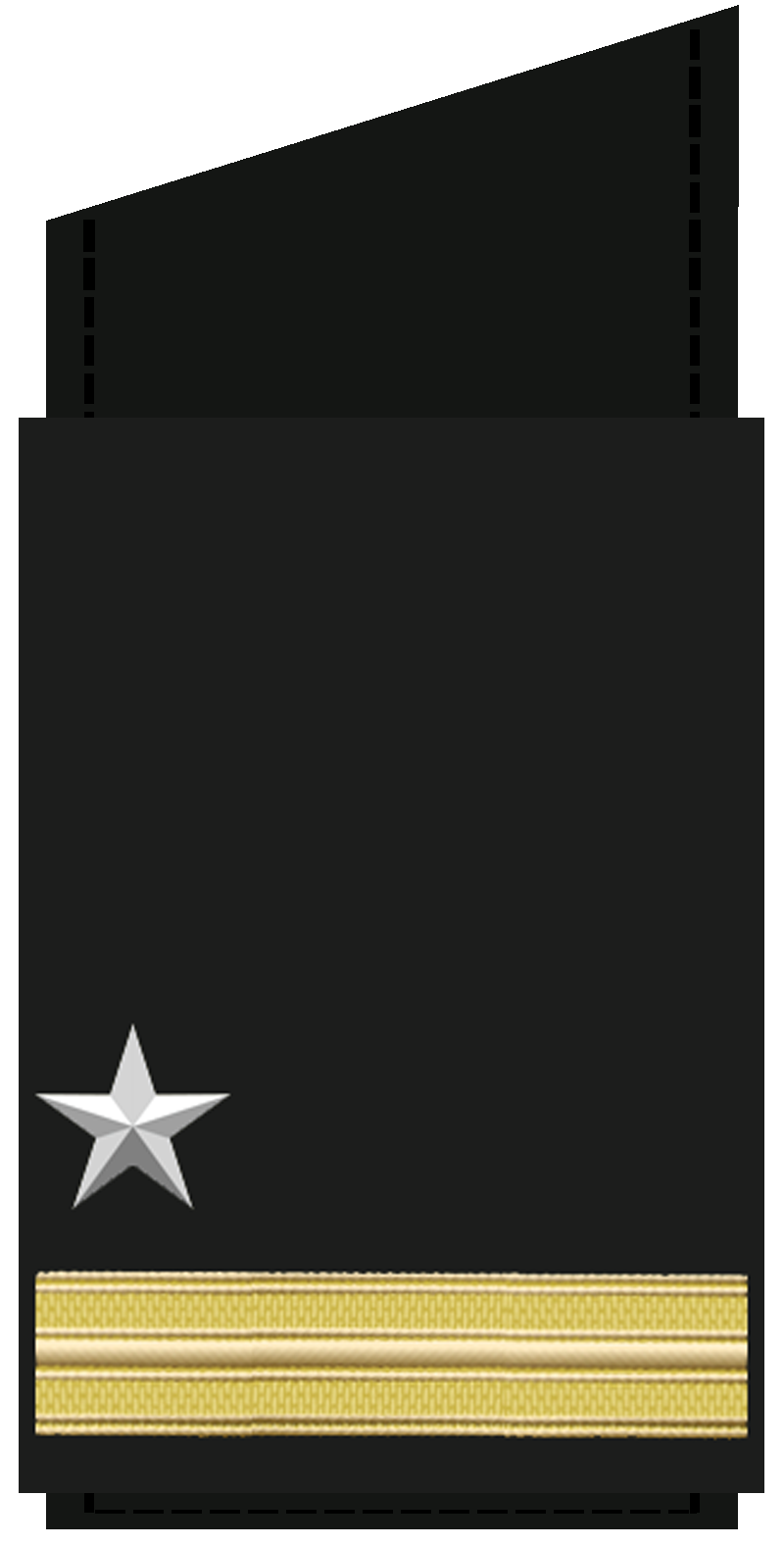
| Rank group | General / flag officers | | | | Senior officers | | | Junior officers |
|---|---|---|---|---|---|---|---|---|---|---|---|
| (Albania) Albanian Land Force and Air Force |
| (Albania) Albanian Land Force and Air Force | Gjeneral | Gjeneral kolonel | Gjeneral lejtnant | Gjeneral major | Kolonel | Nënkolonel | Major | Kapiten i parë | Kapiten | Toger | Nëntoger |
| Albanian Naval Force |
| Albanian Naval Force | | Admiral | Nënadmiral | Kundëradmiral | Kapiten i Rangut I | Kapiten i Rangut II | Kapiten i Rangut III | Kapiten Lejtnant I | Kapiten Lejtnant II | Lejtnant | Nënlejtnant |

Other

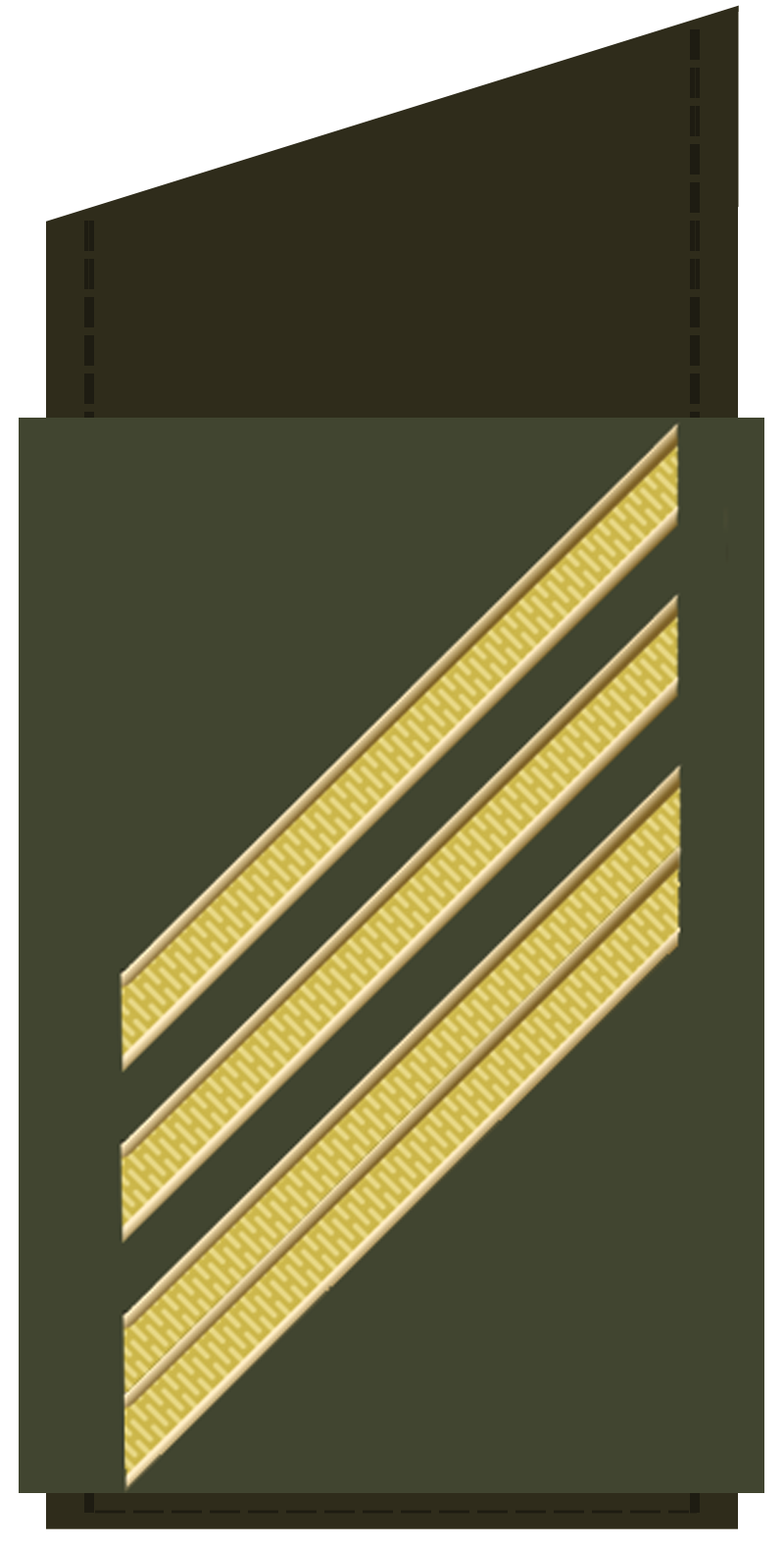
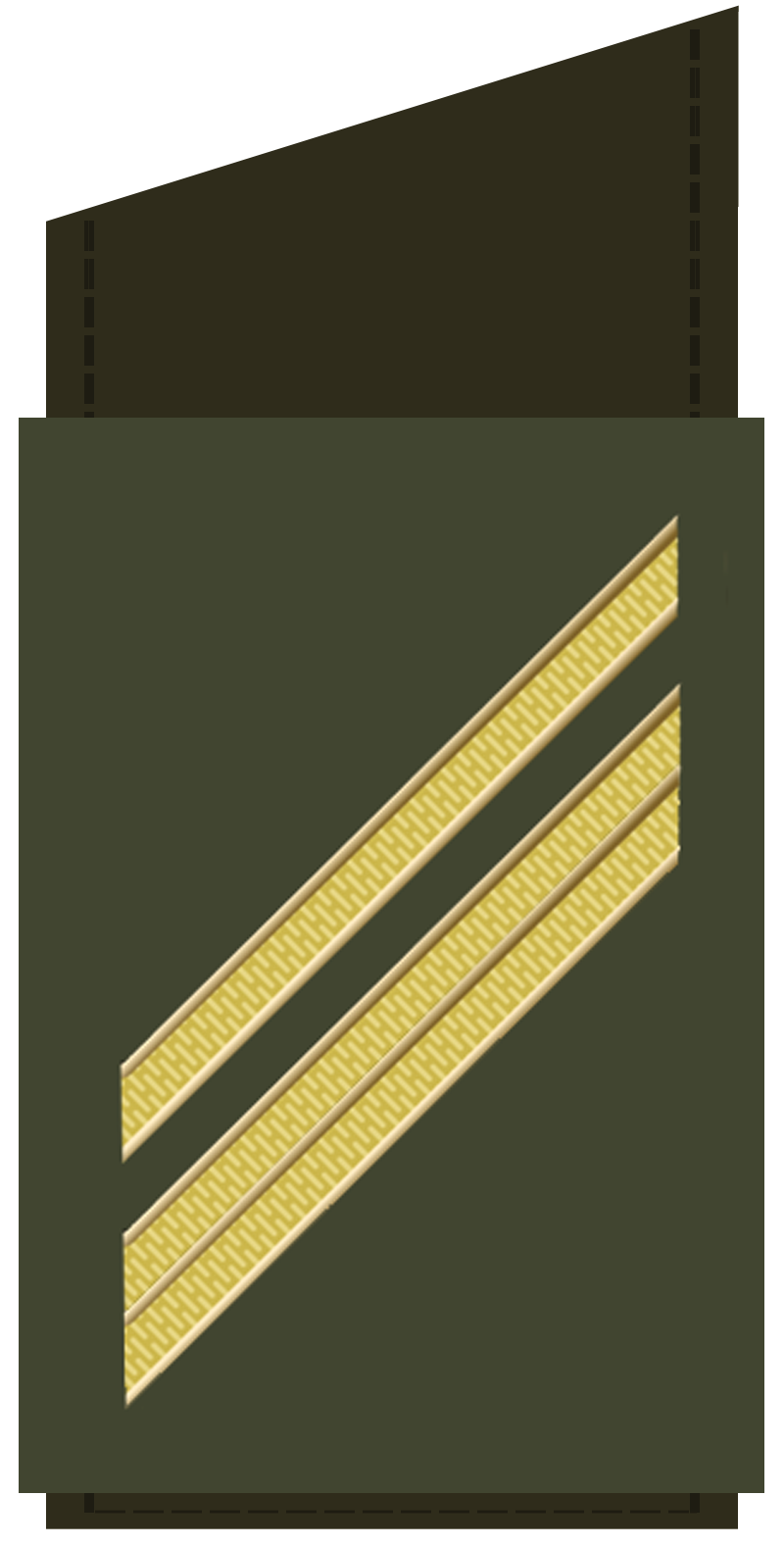
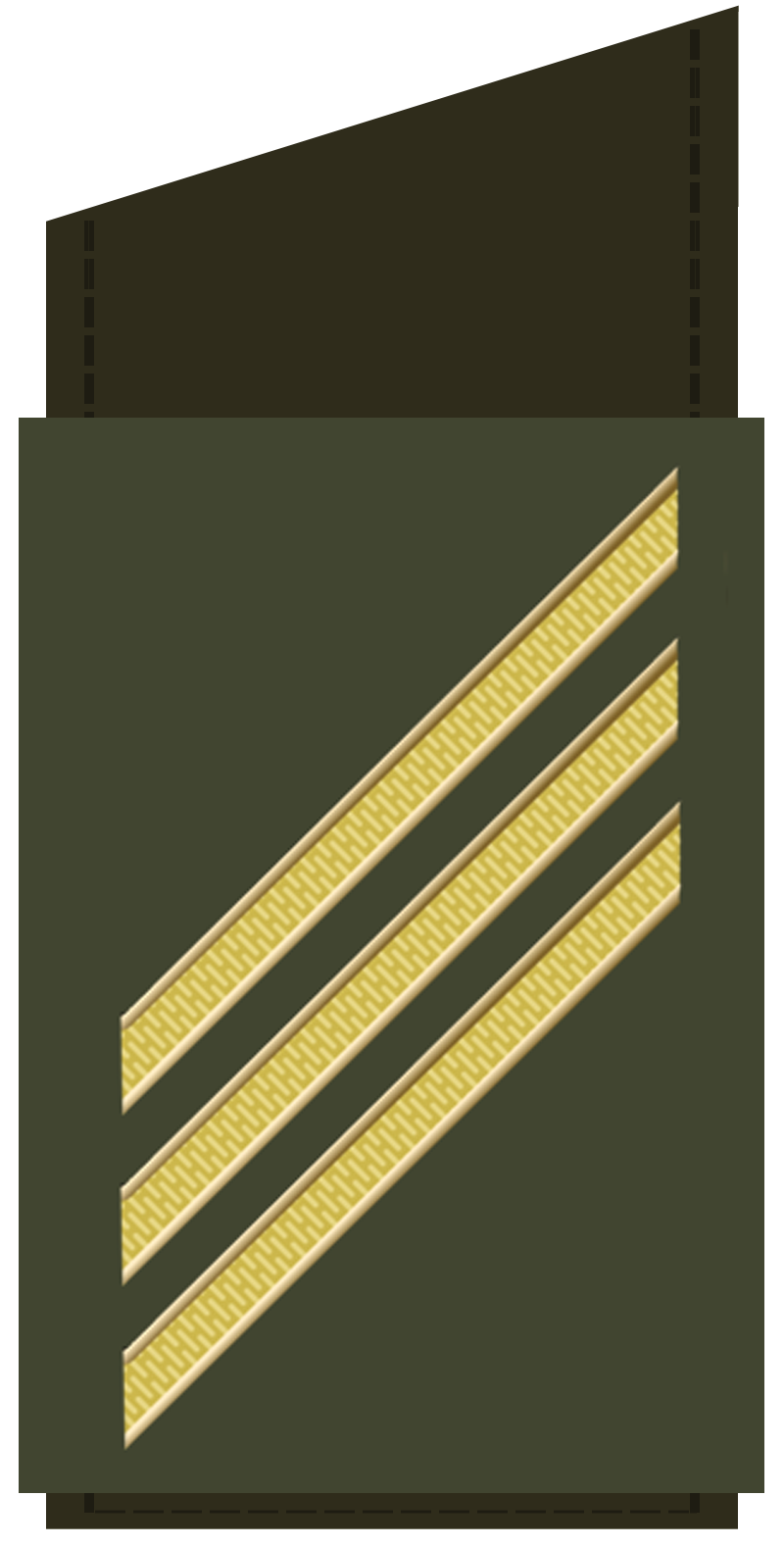
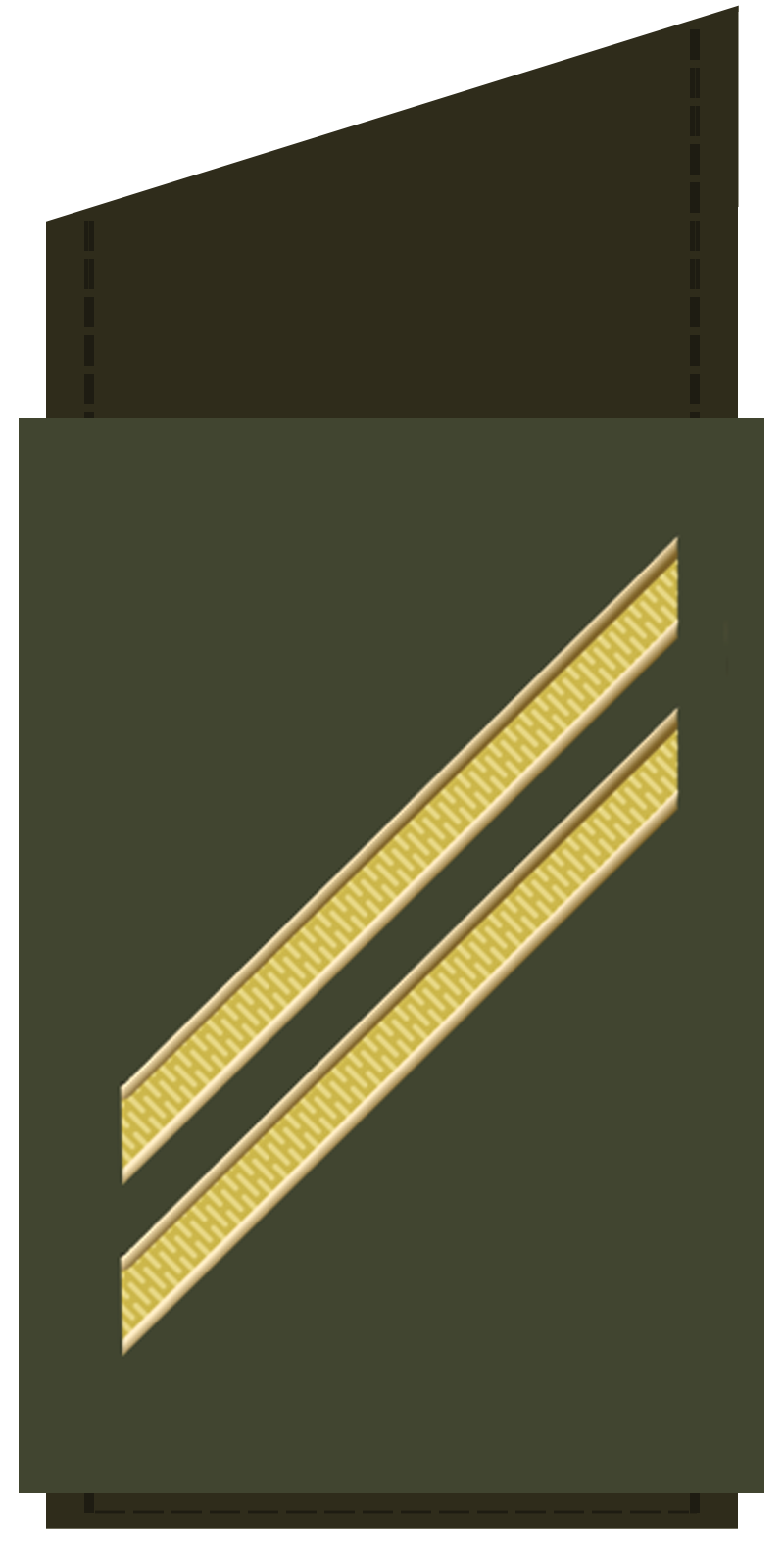
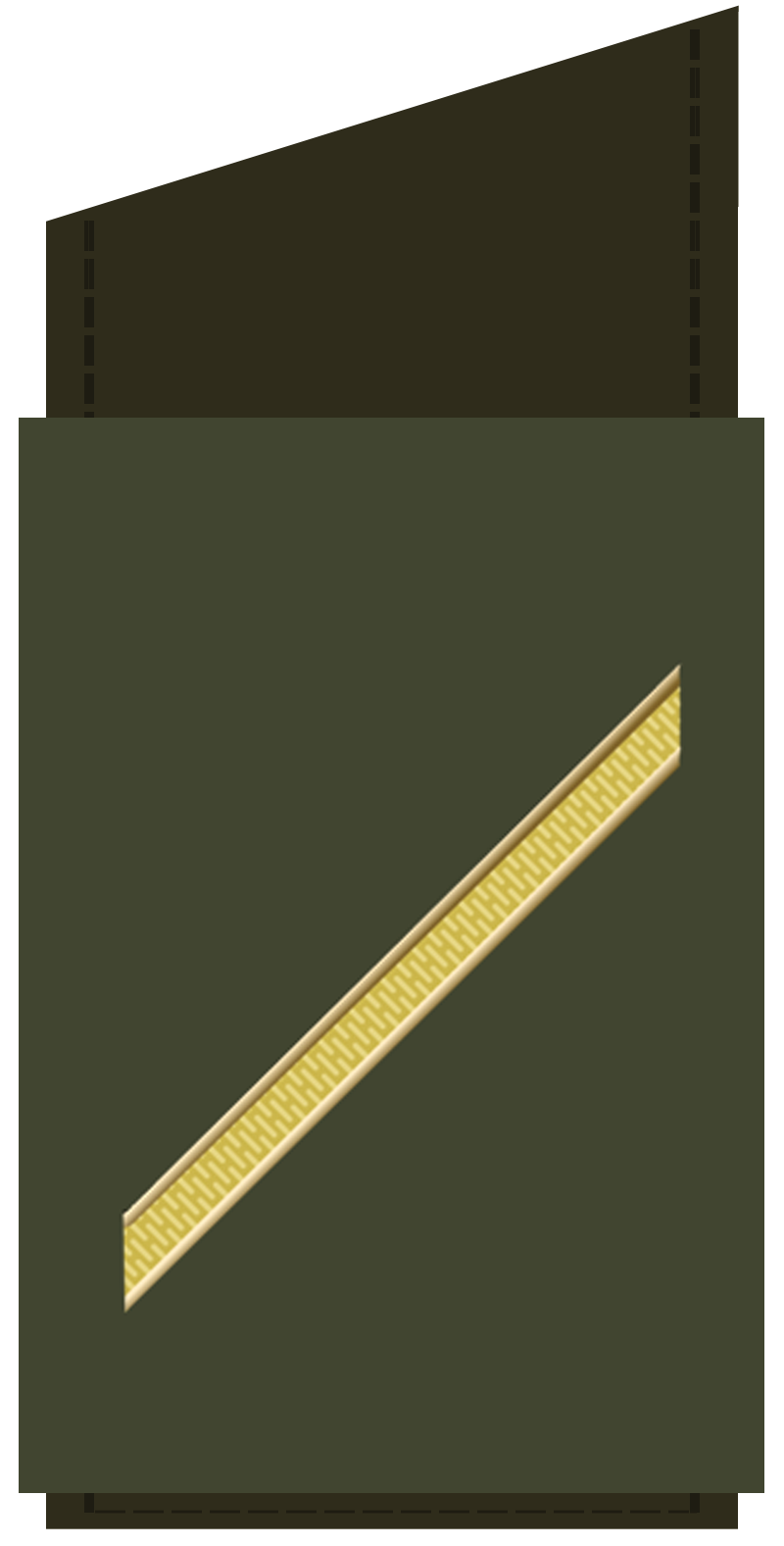
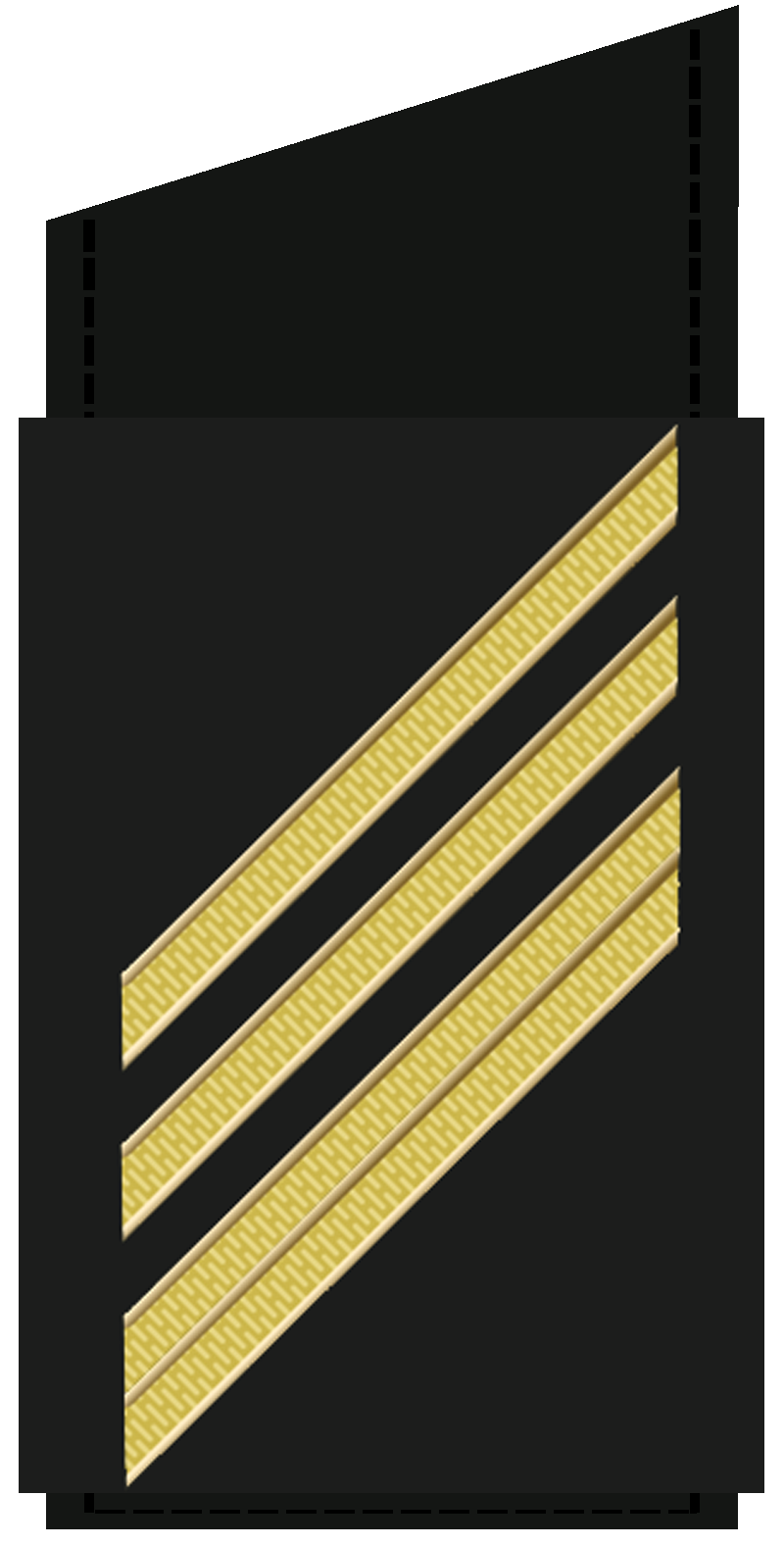
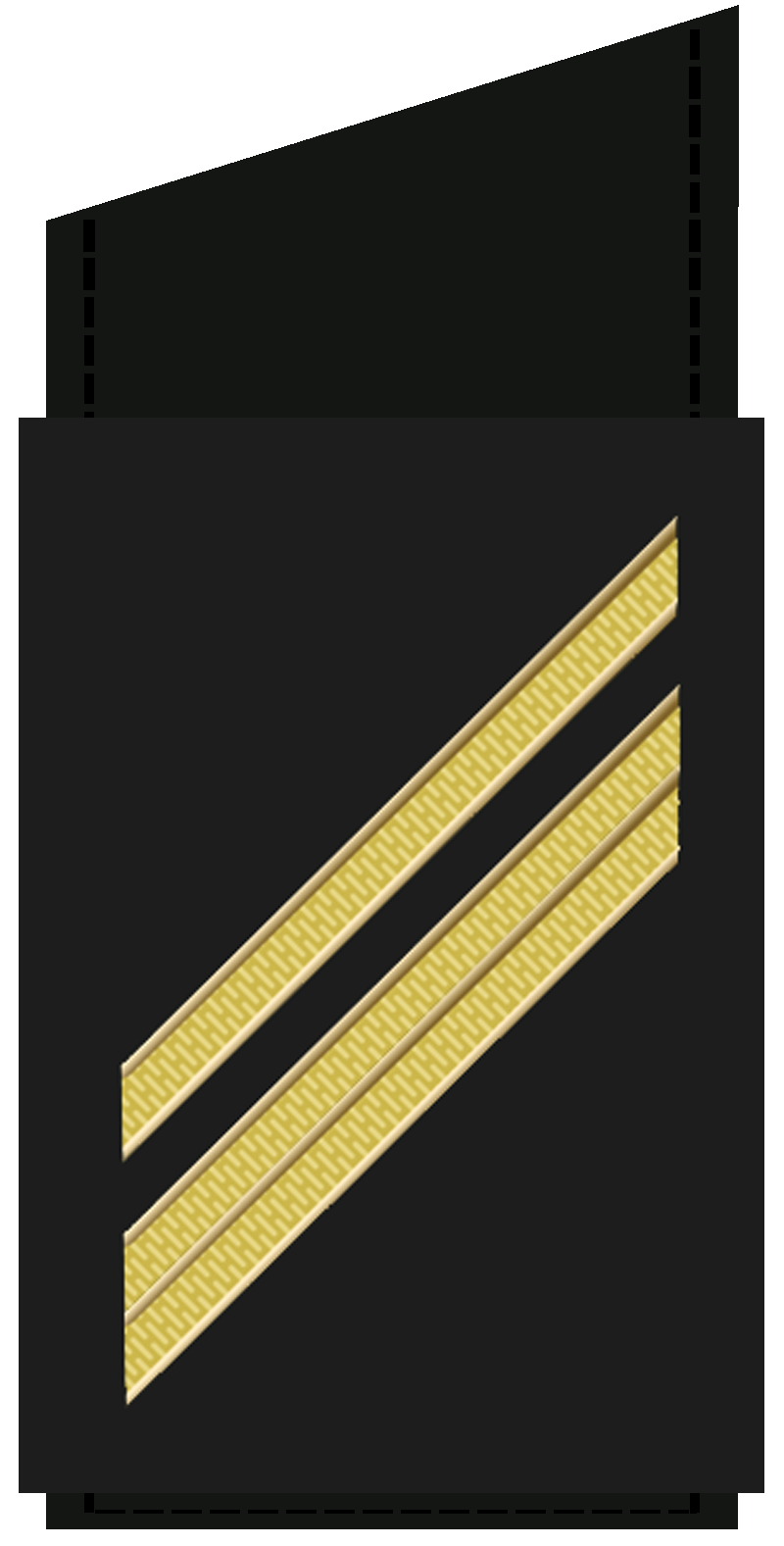
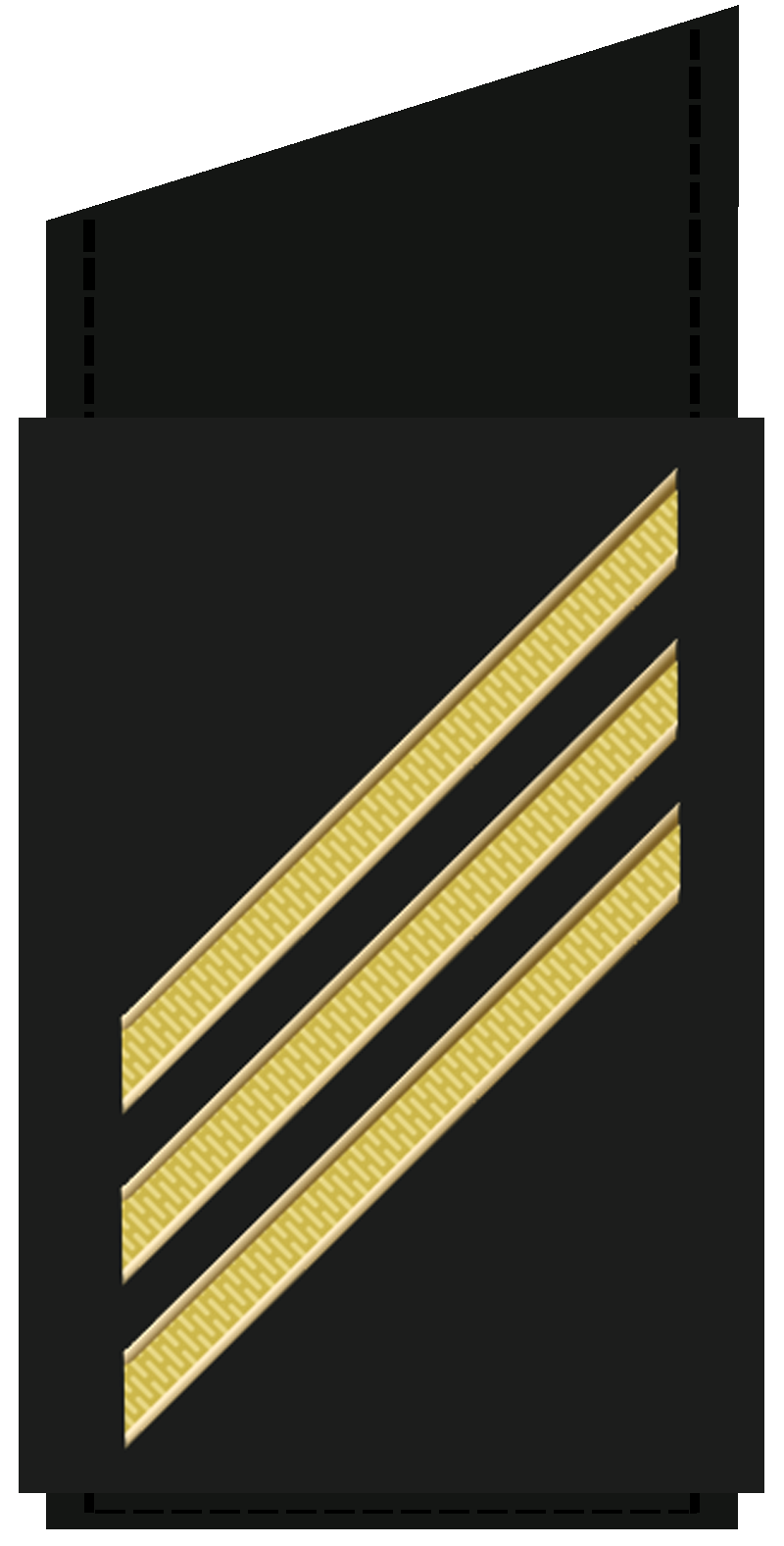
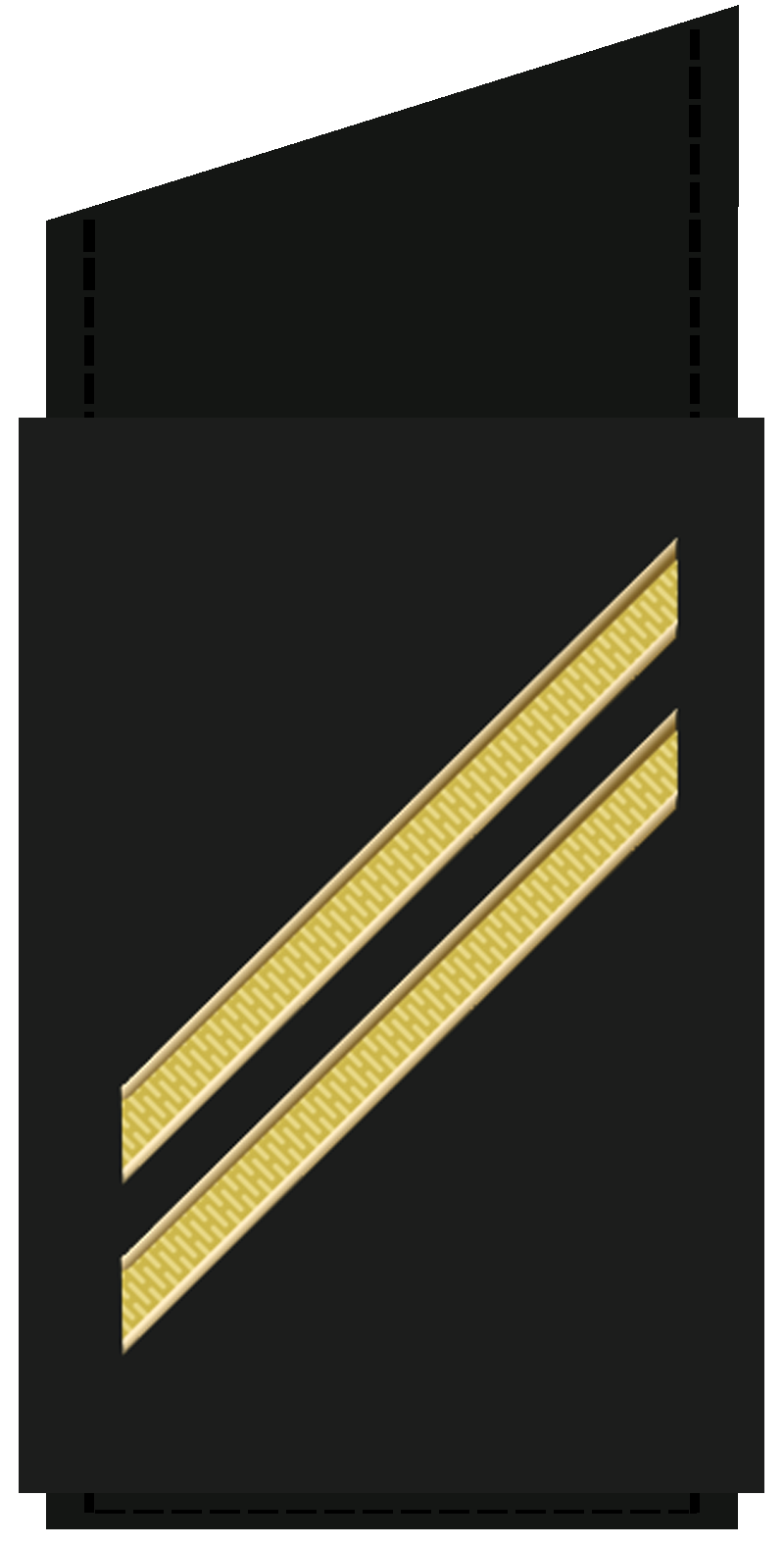
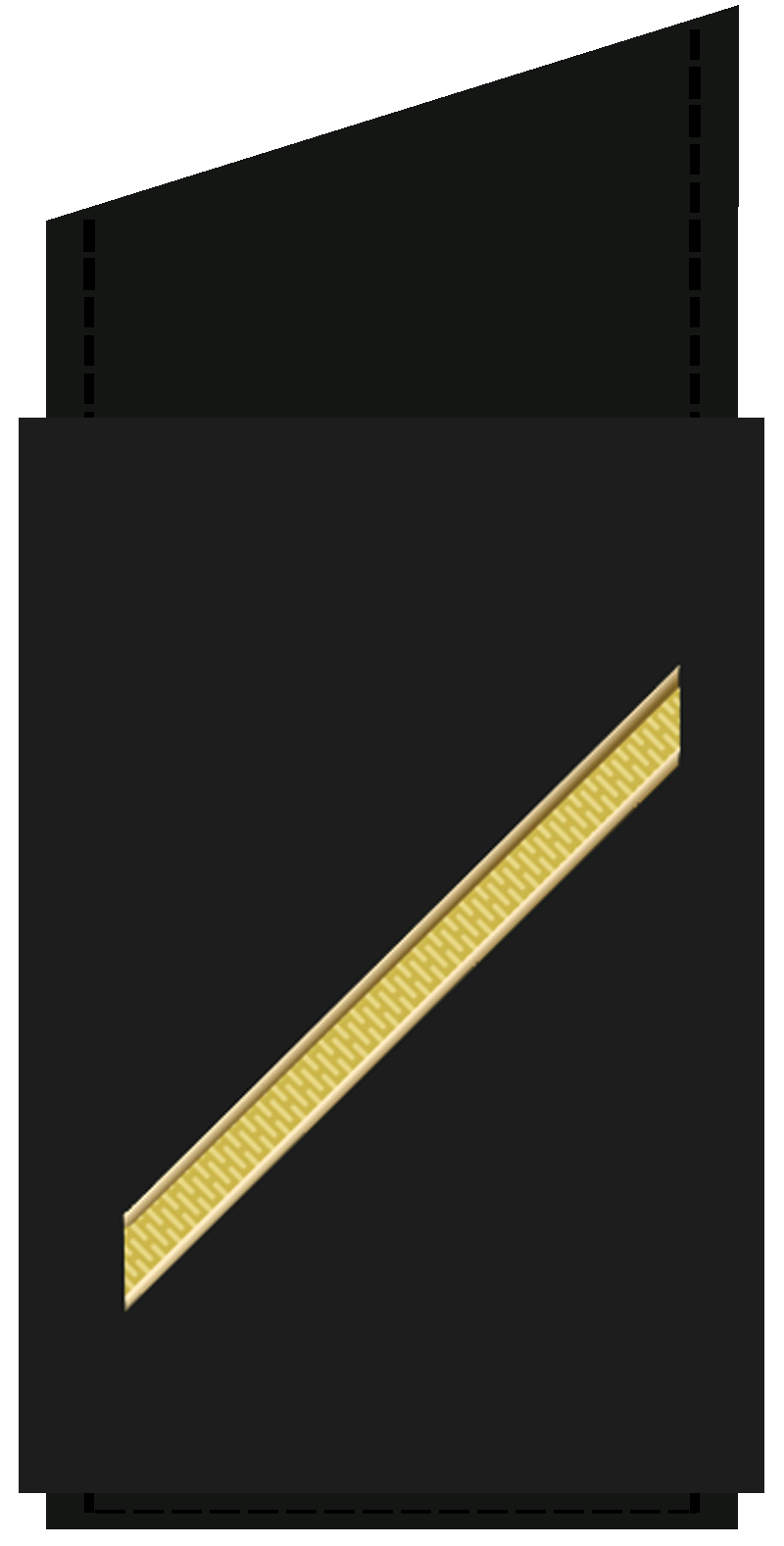
| Rank group | Senior NCOs | | | | Junior NCOs | Enlisted |
|---|---|---|---|---|---|---|
| (Albania) Albanian Land Force and Air Force | | | | | | No insignia |
| (Albania) Albanian Land Force and Air Force | Kapter i parë | Kapter | Rreshter i parë | Rreshter | Tetar |
| Albanian Naval Force | | | | | | No insignia |
| Albanian Naval Force | Miçman i parë | Miçman | Rreshter i parë | Rreshter | Tetar |

=== 1999–2004 ===
Commissioned officers

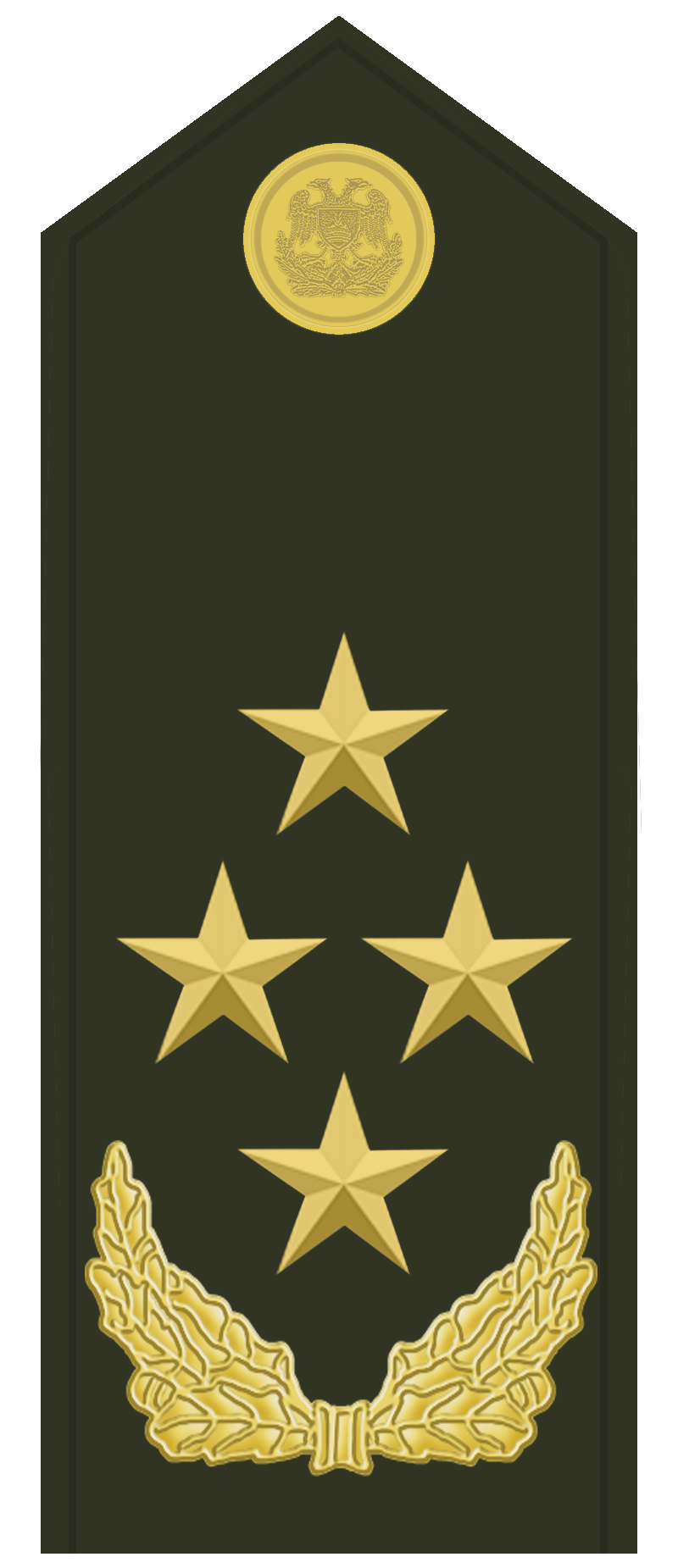
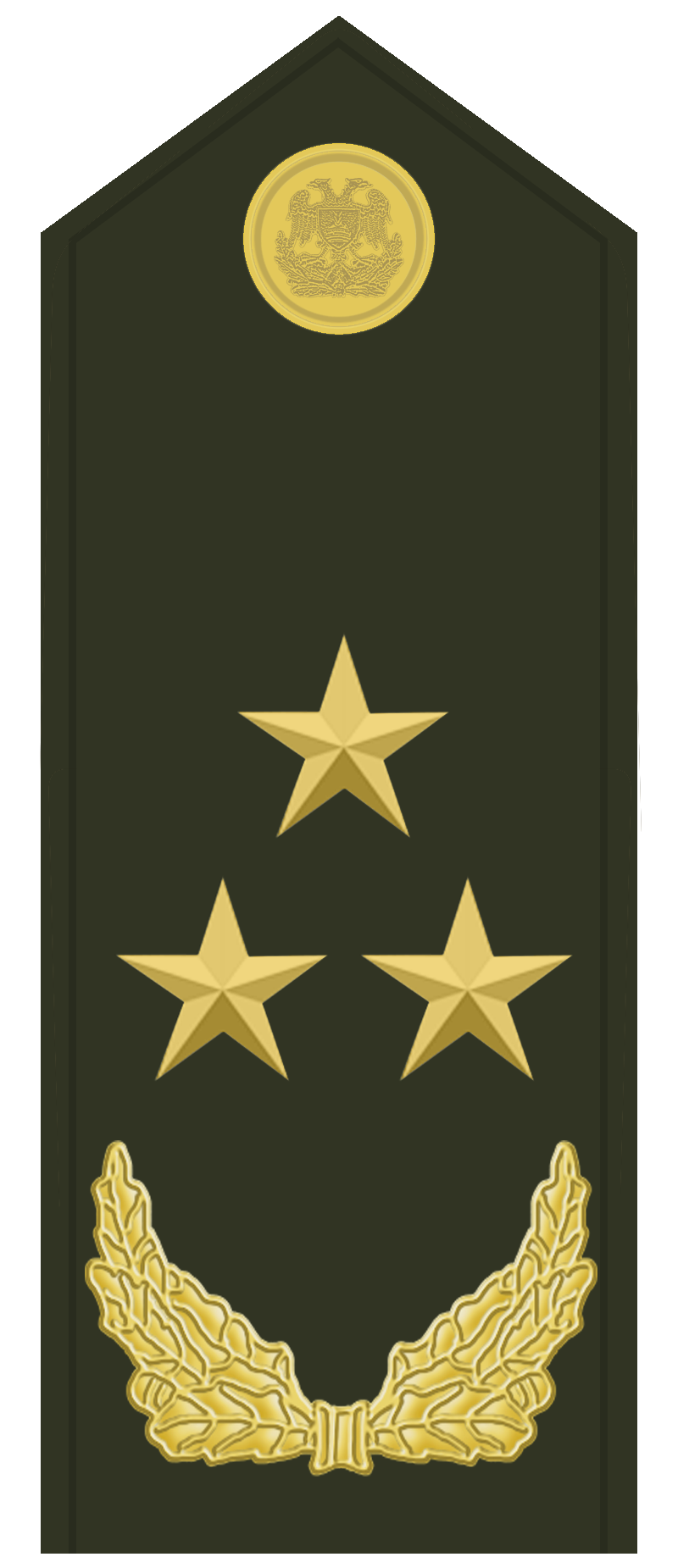
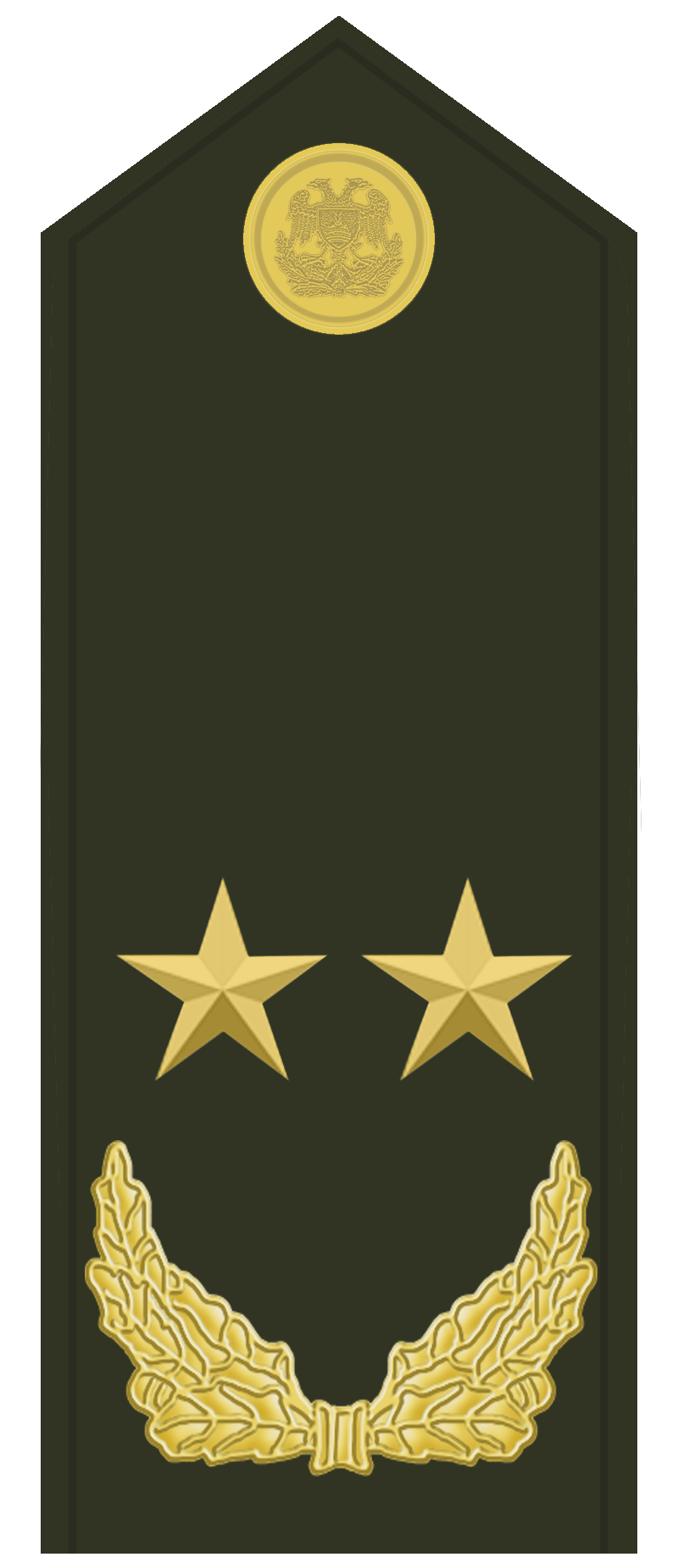
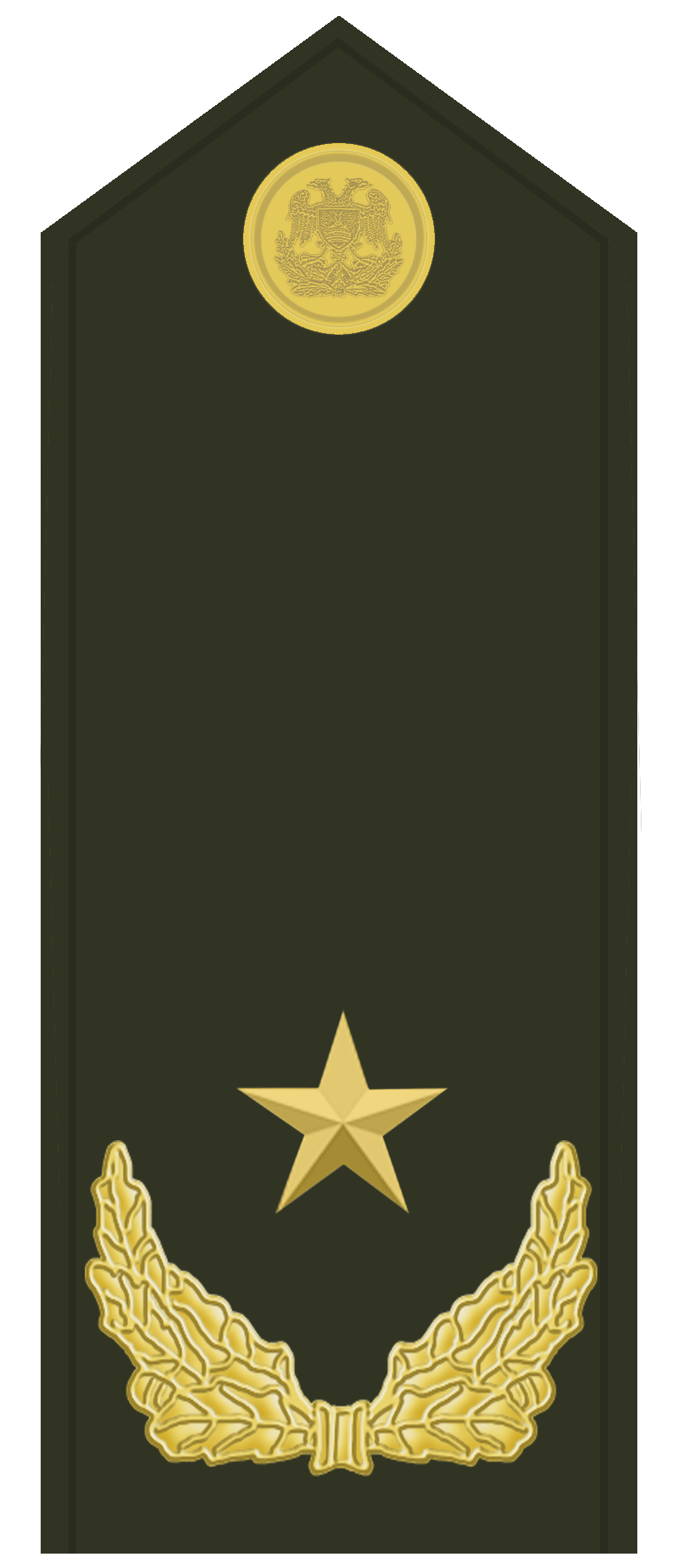
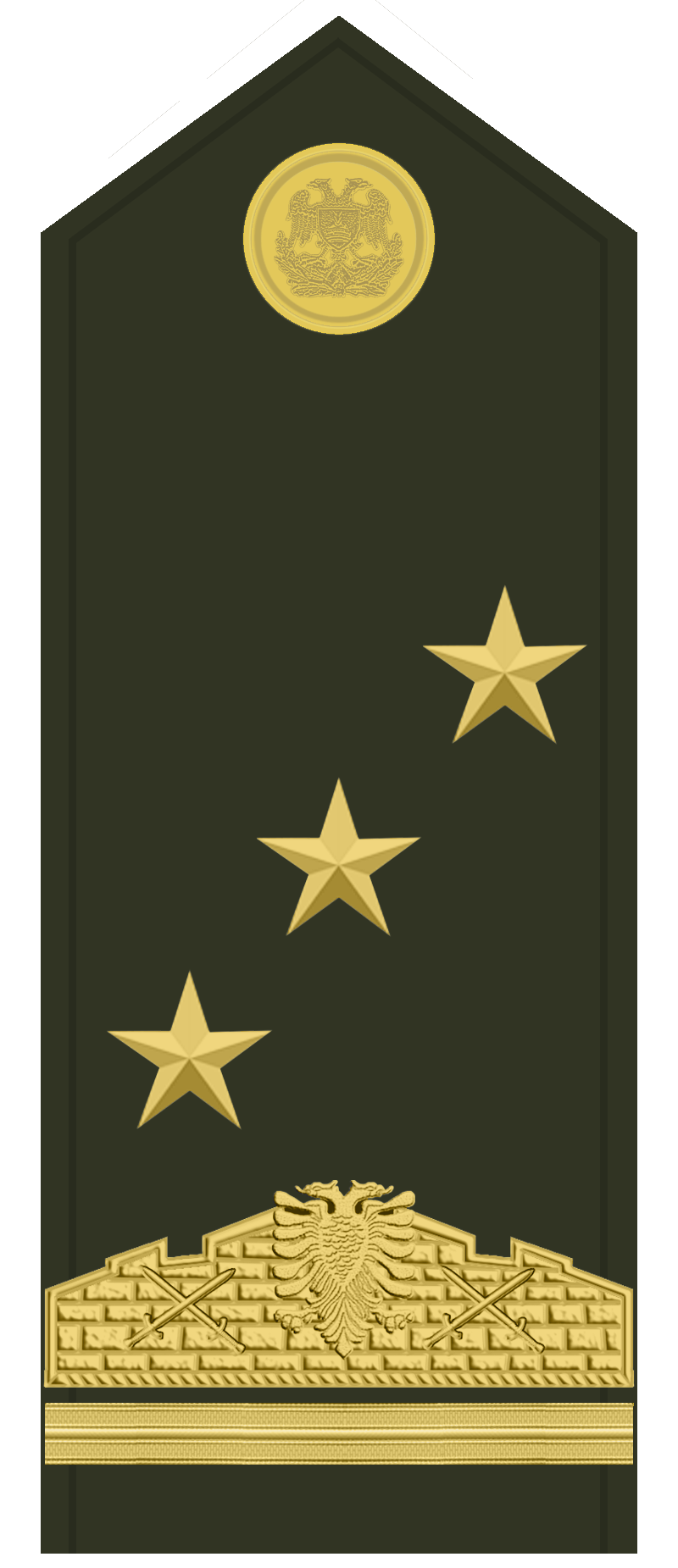
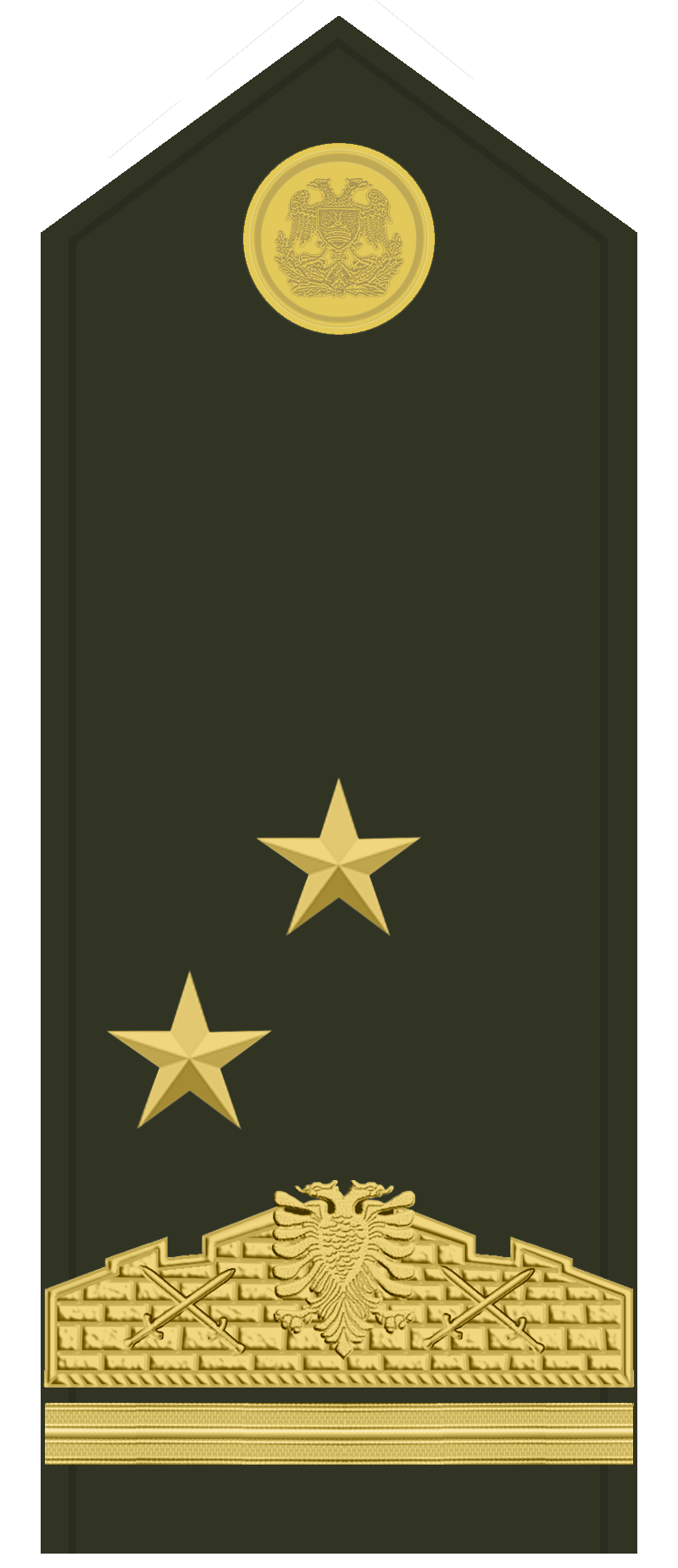
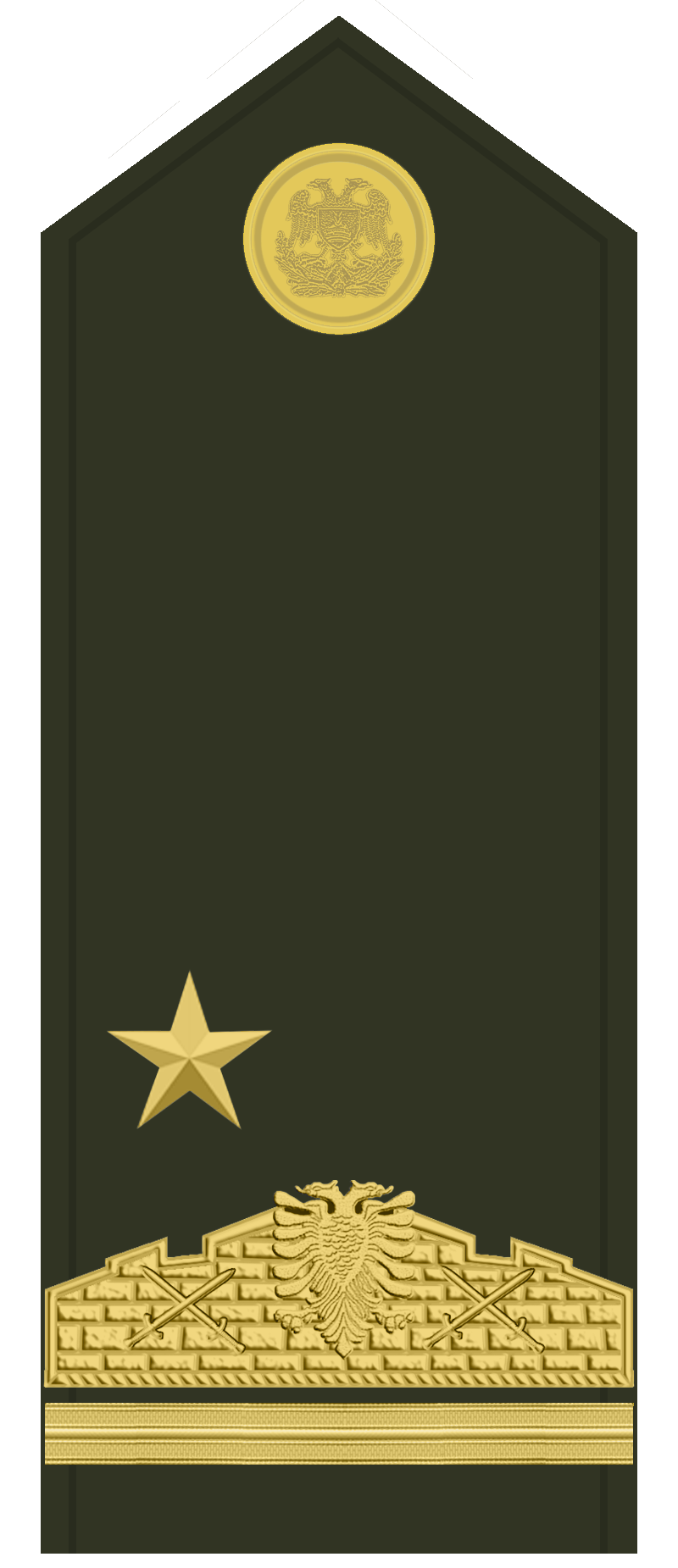
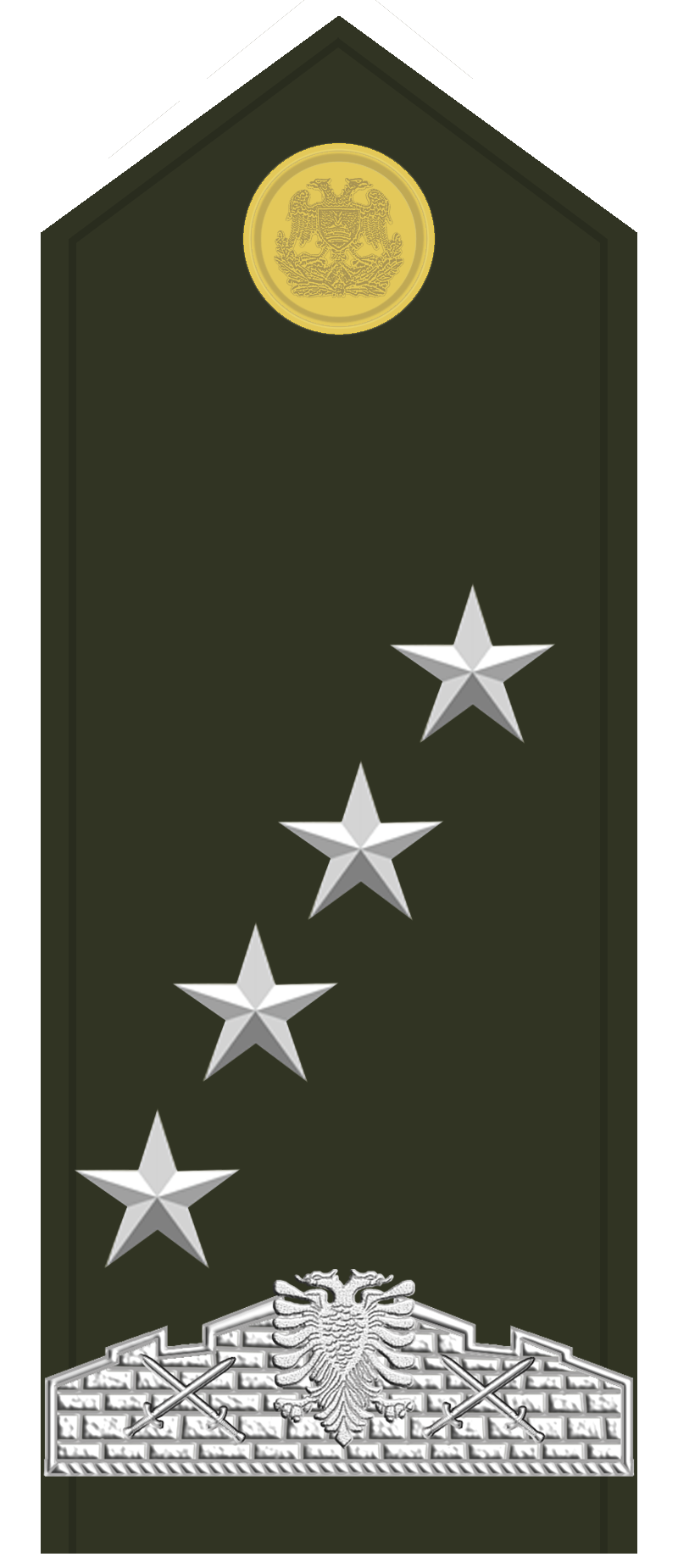
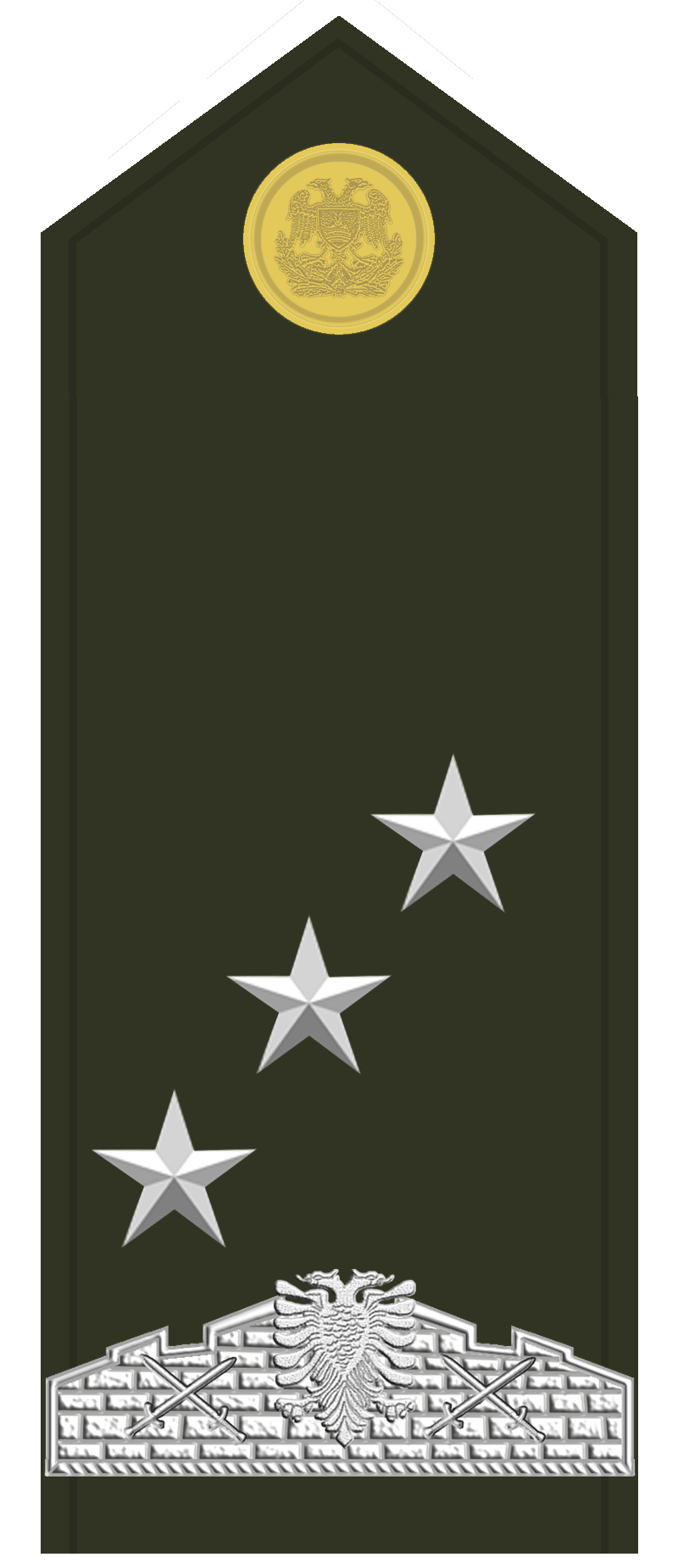
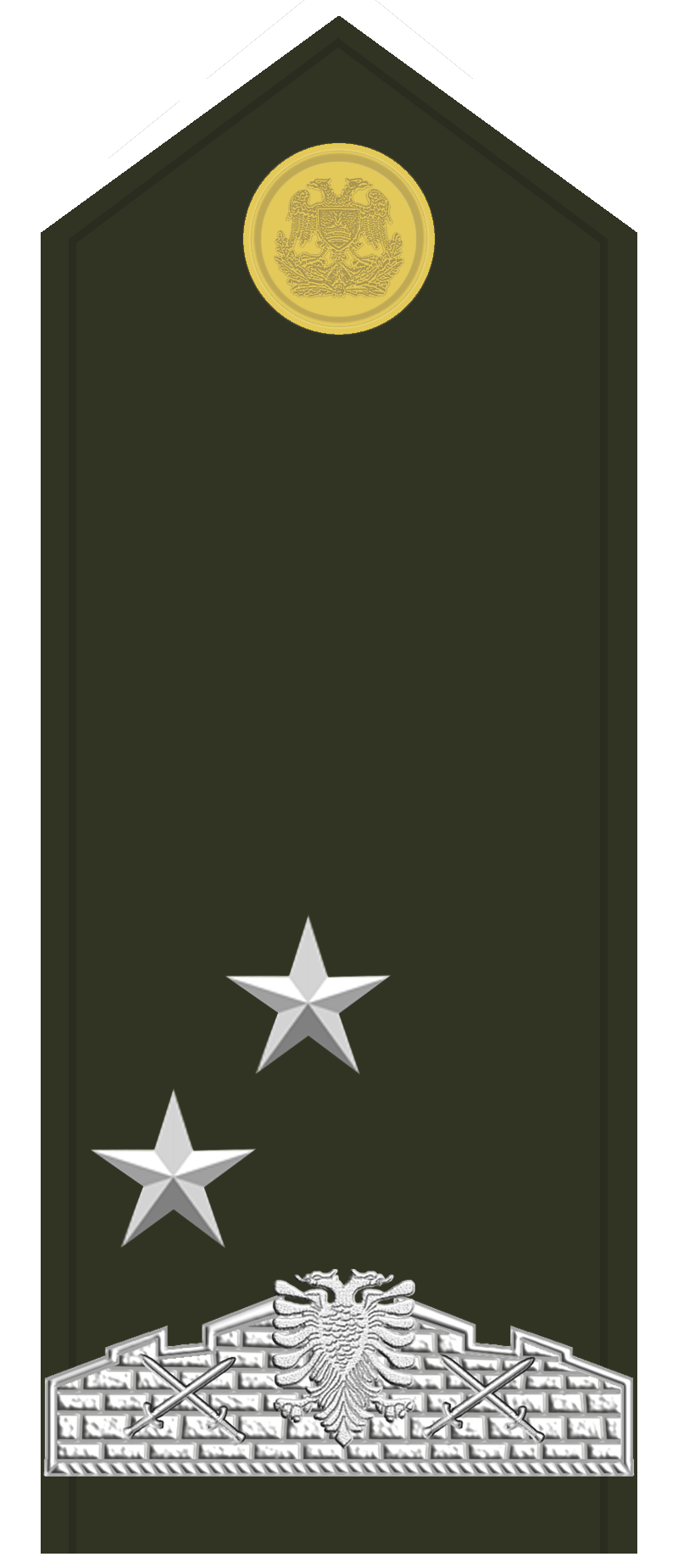
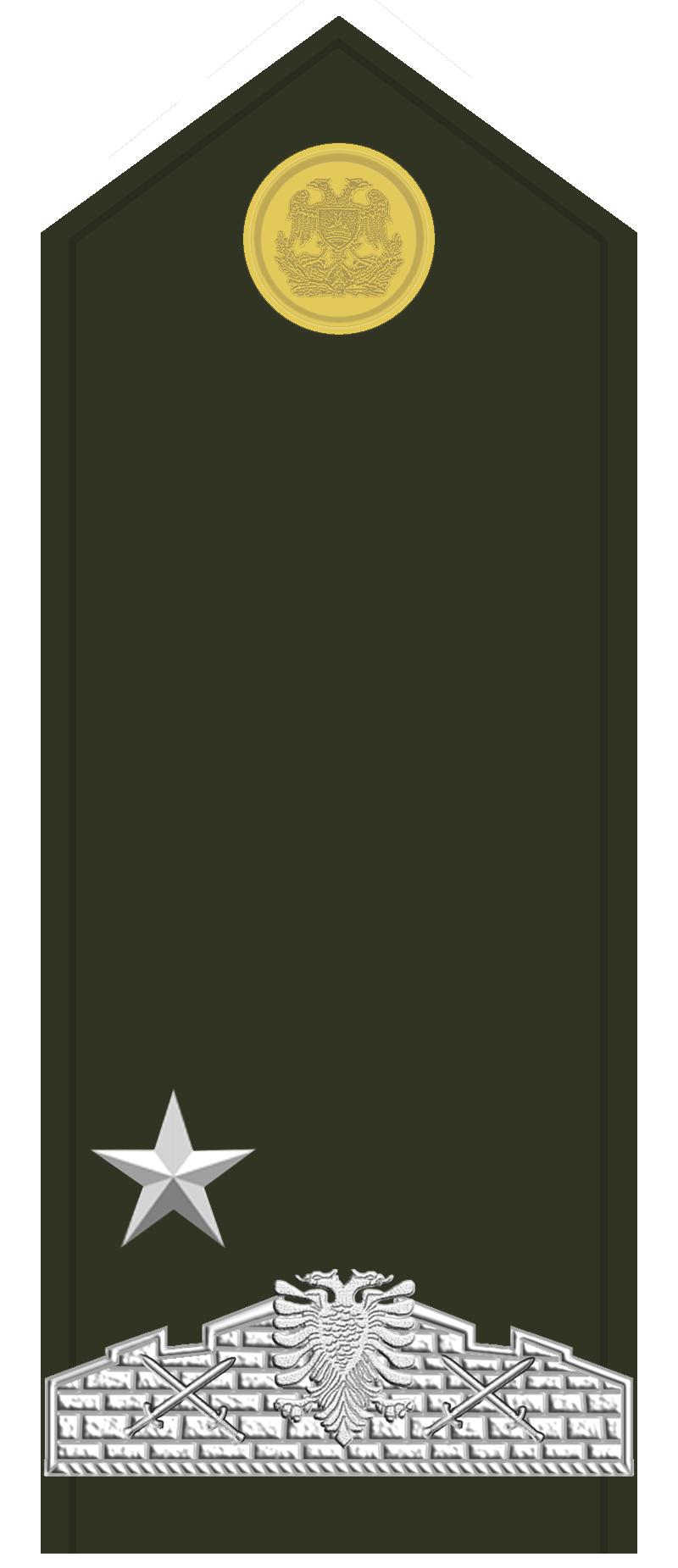
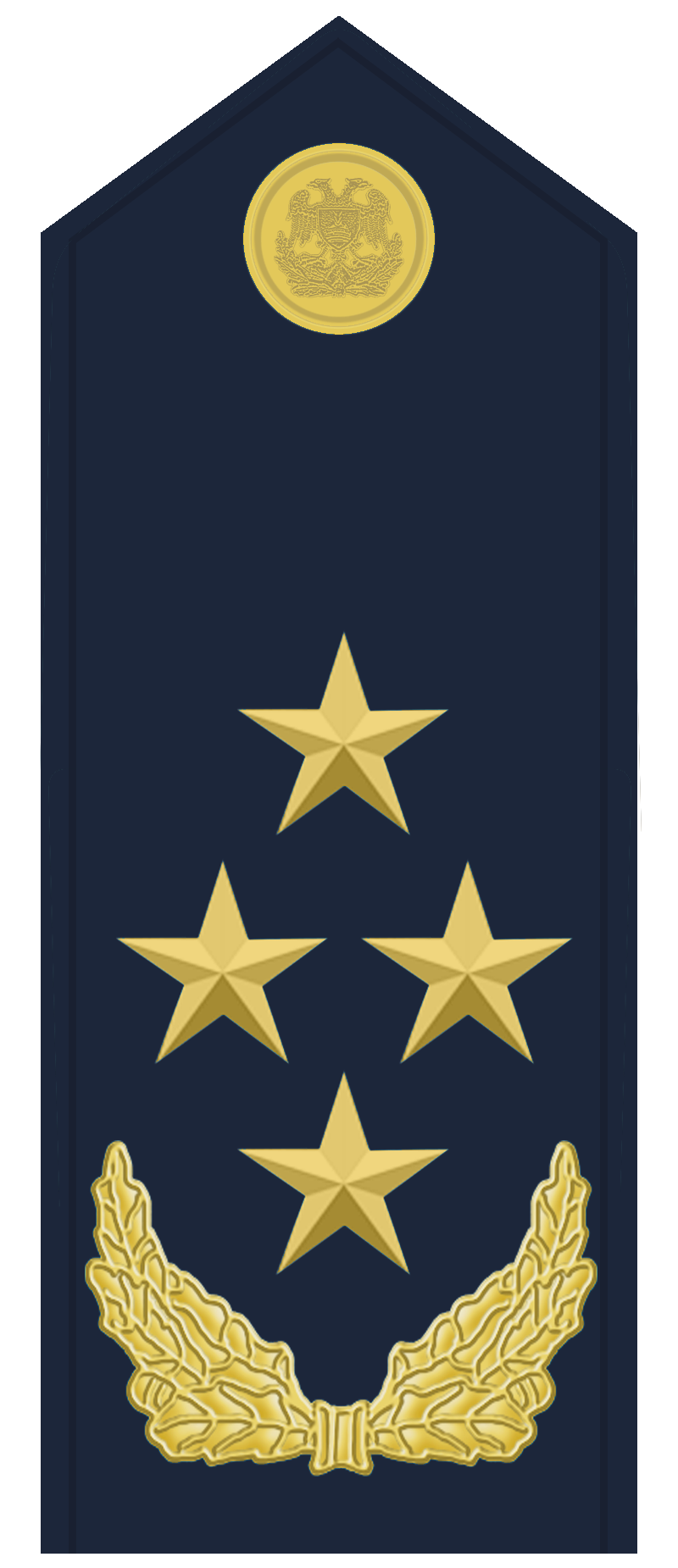
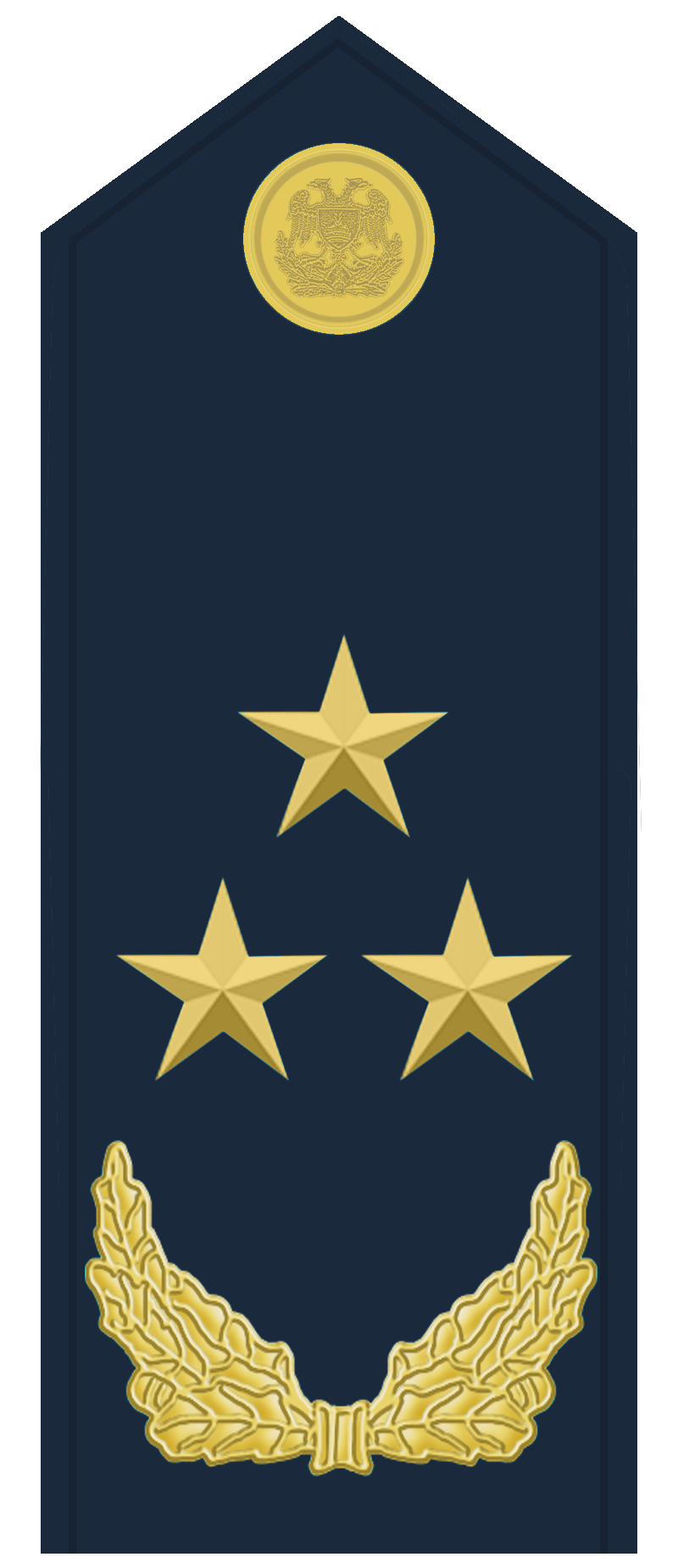
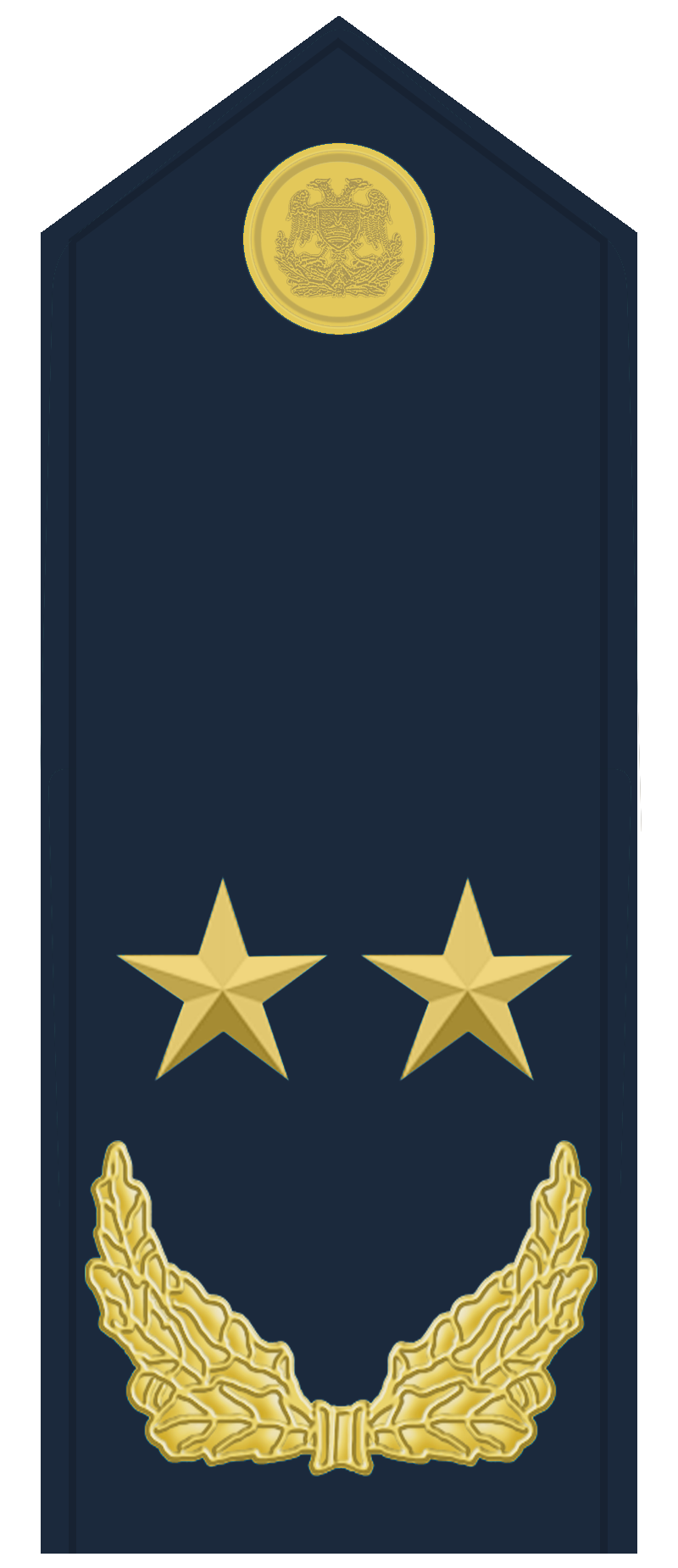
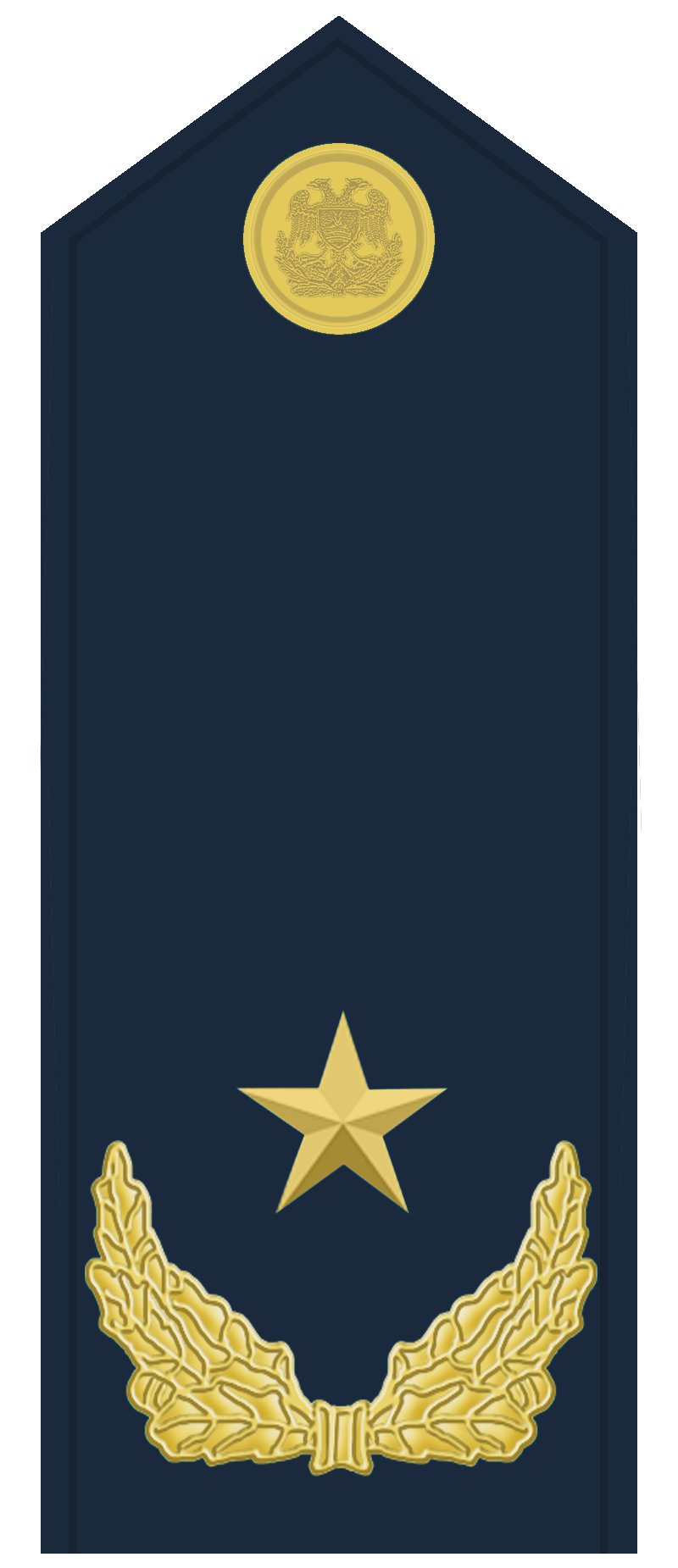
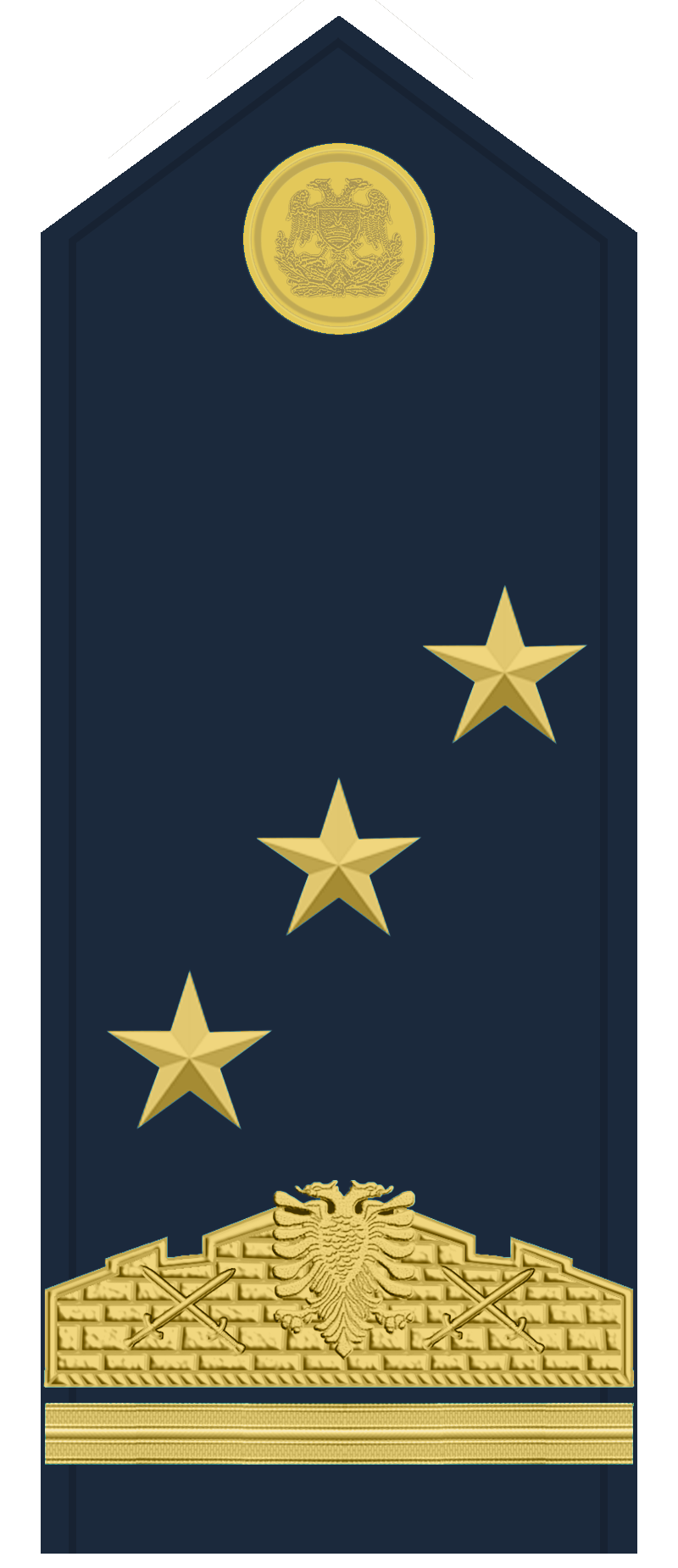
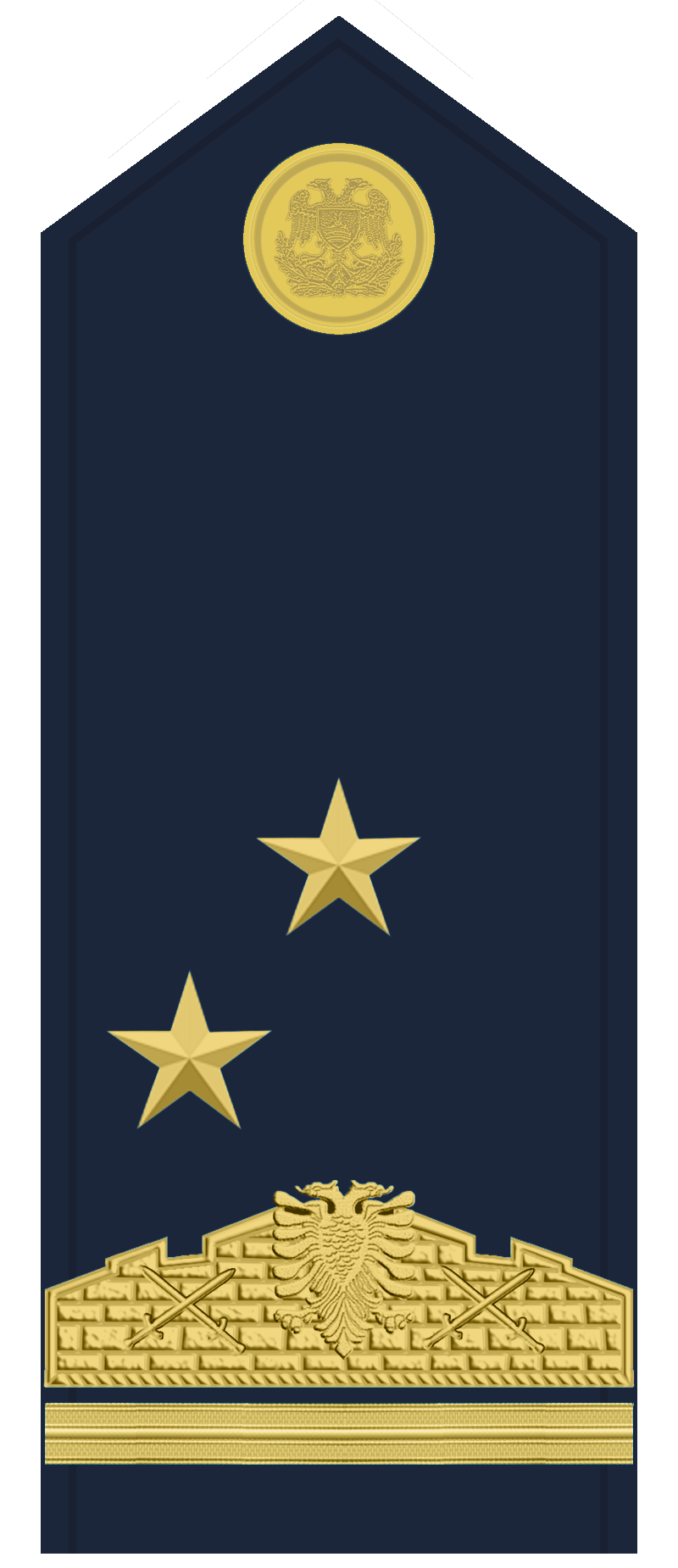
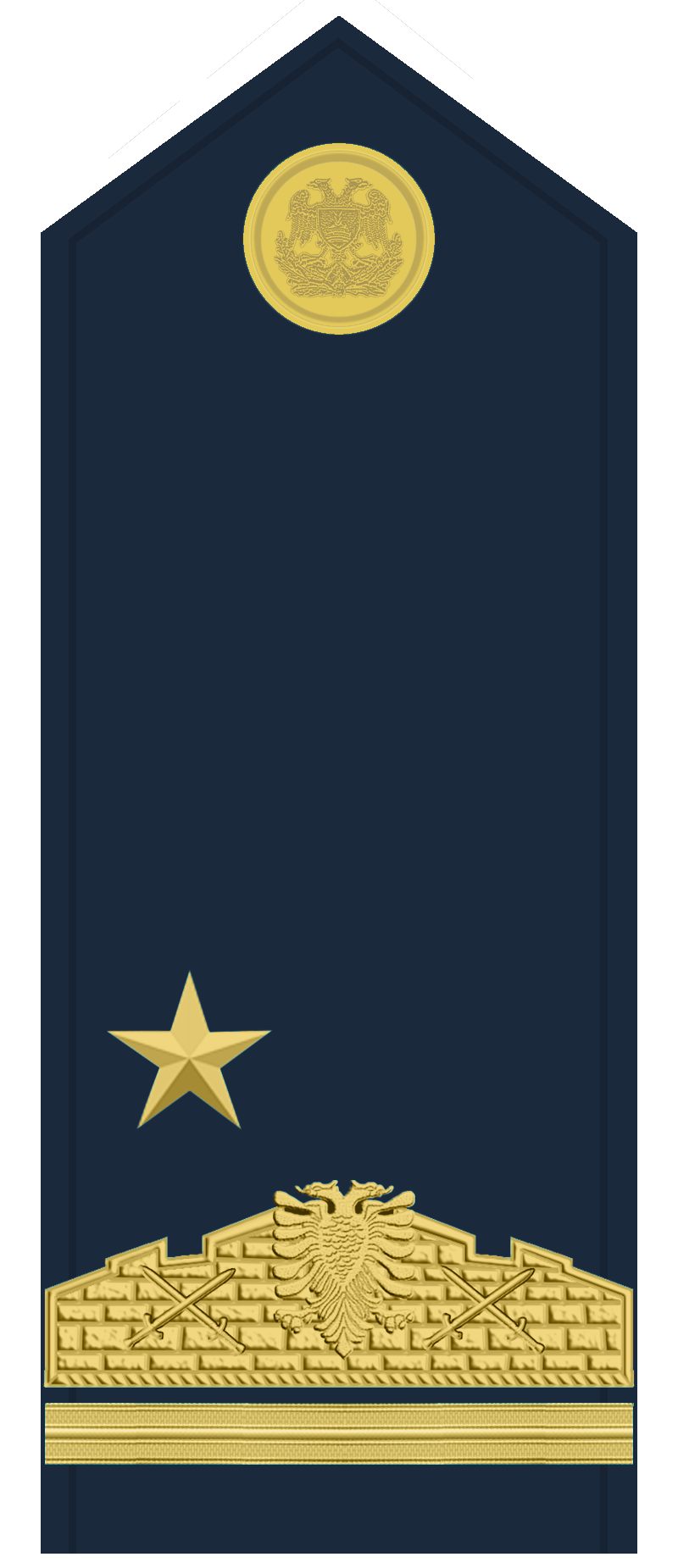
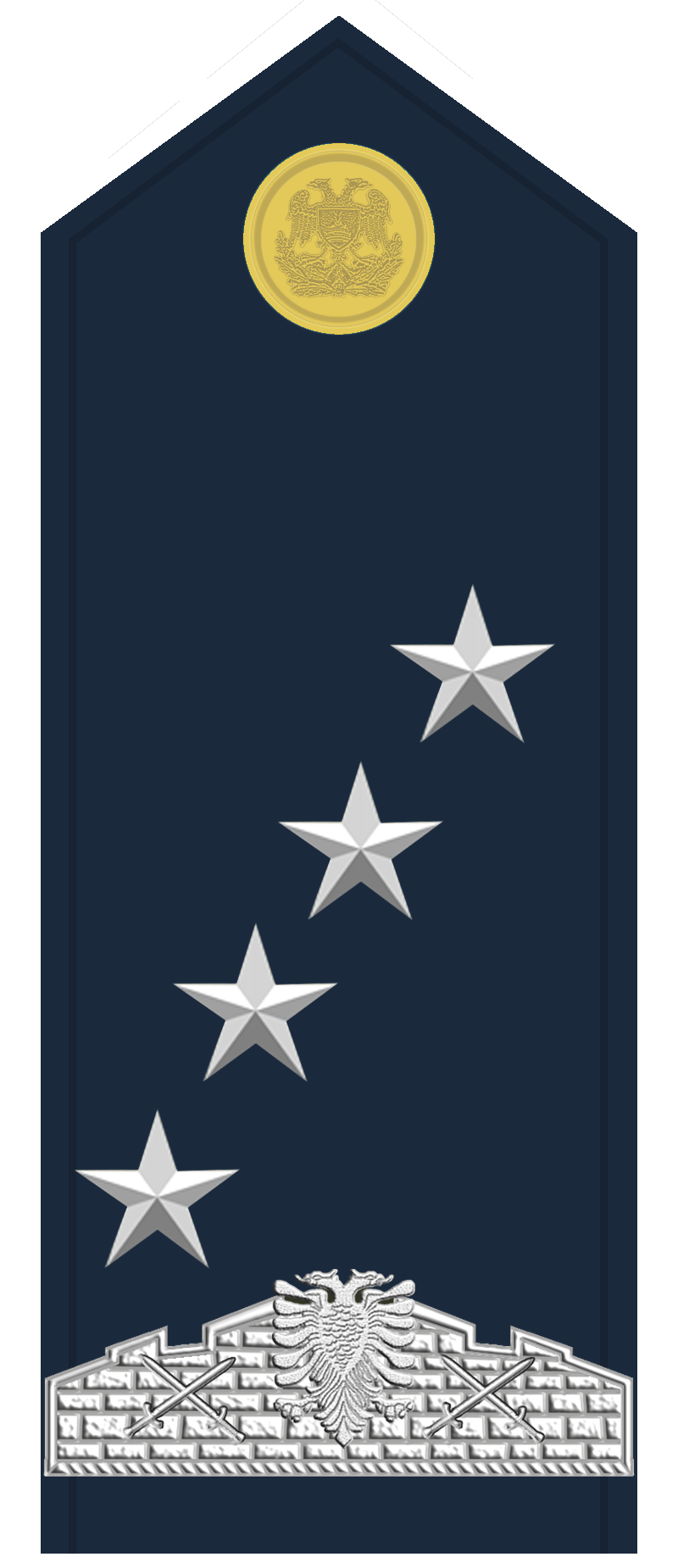
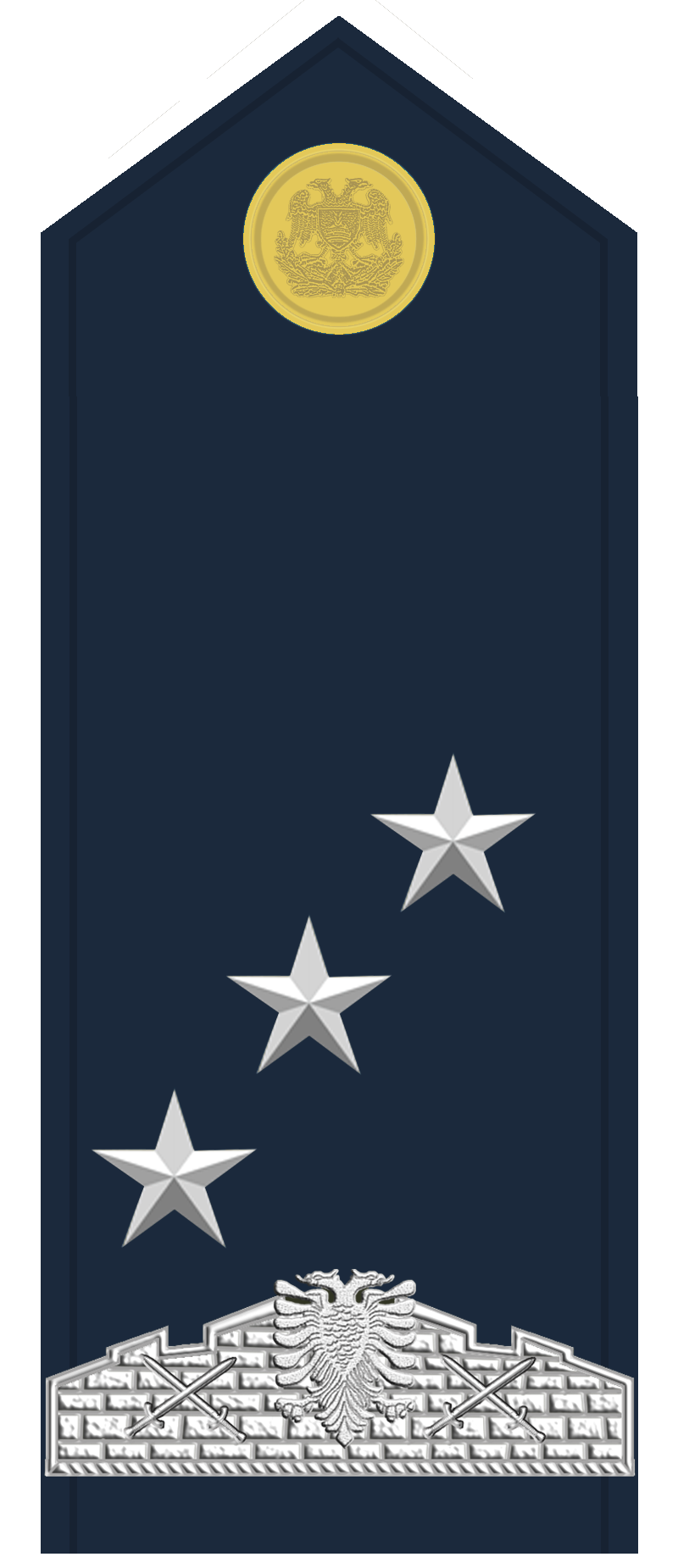
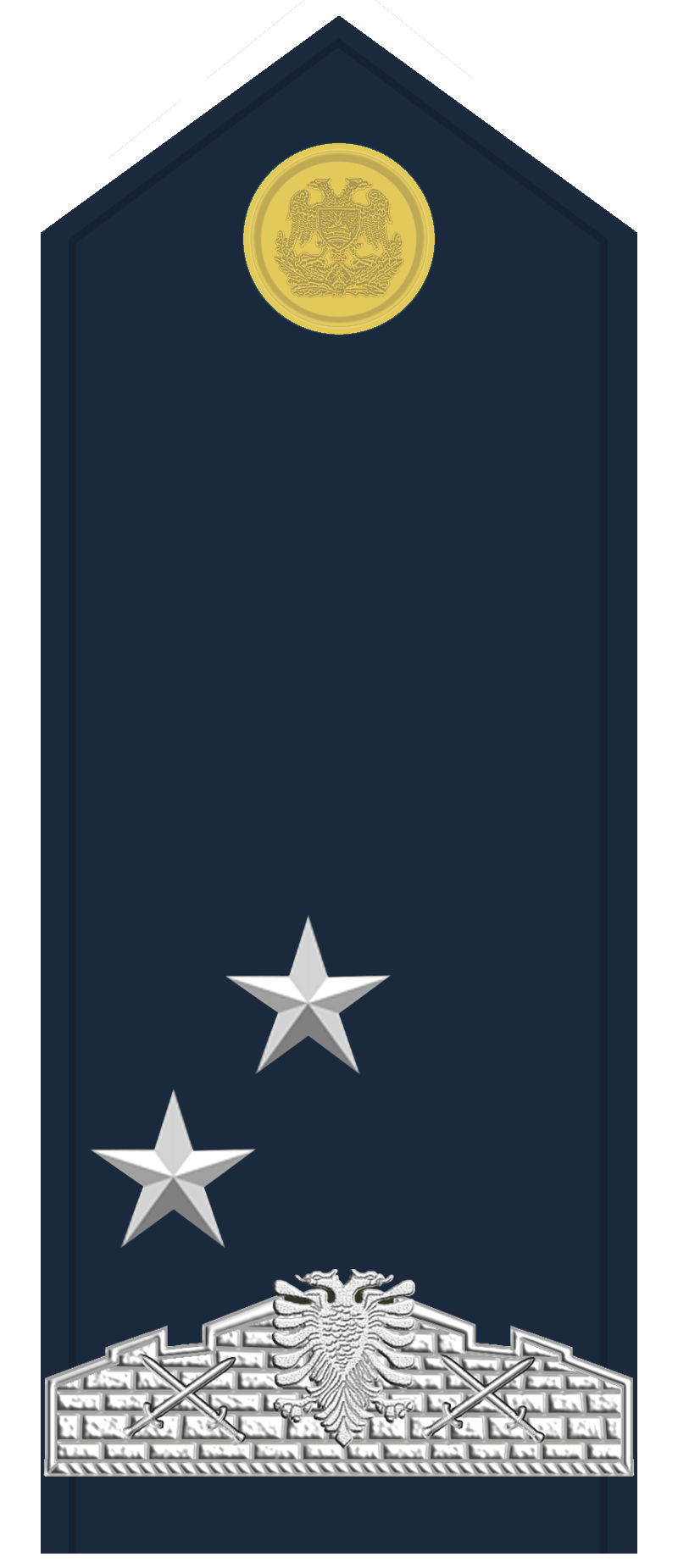
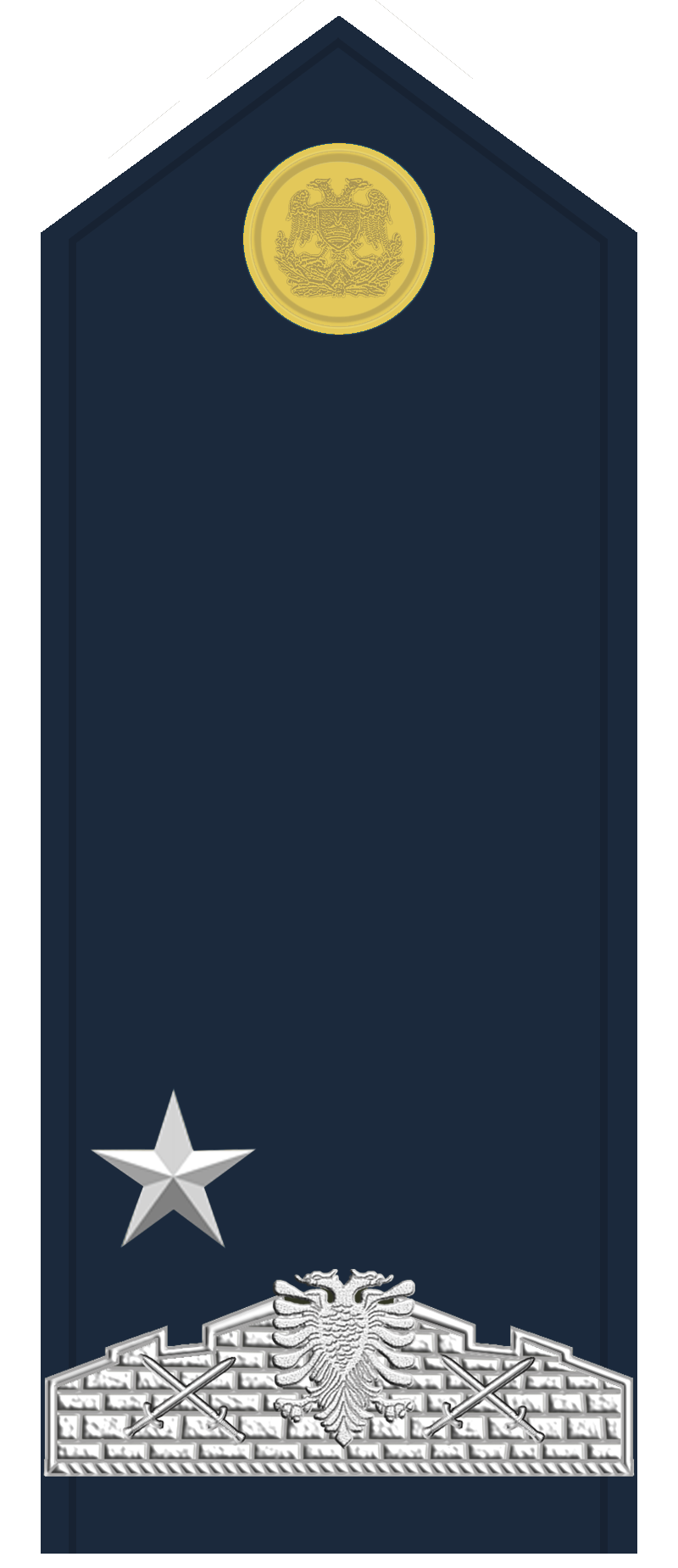
| Rank group | General / flag officers | | | | Senior officers | | | Junior officers |
|---|---|---|---|---|---|---|---|---|---|---|---|
| (Albania) Albanian Land Force |
| (Albania) Albanian Land Force | Gjeneral | Gjeneral Kolonel | Gjeneral Lejtnant | Gjeneral Major | Kolonel | Nënkolonel | Major | Kapiten i parë | Kapiten | Toger | Nëntoger |
| (Albania) Albanian Air Force |
| (Albania) Albanian Air Force | Gjeneral | Gjeneral Kolonel | Gjeneral Lejtnant | Gjeneral Major | Kolonel | Nënkolonel | Major | Kapiten i parë | Kapiten | Toger | Nëntoger |

Enlisted

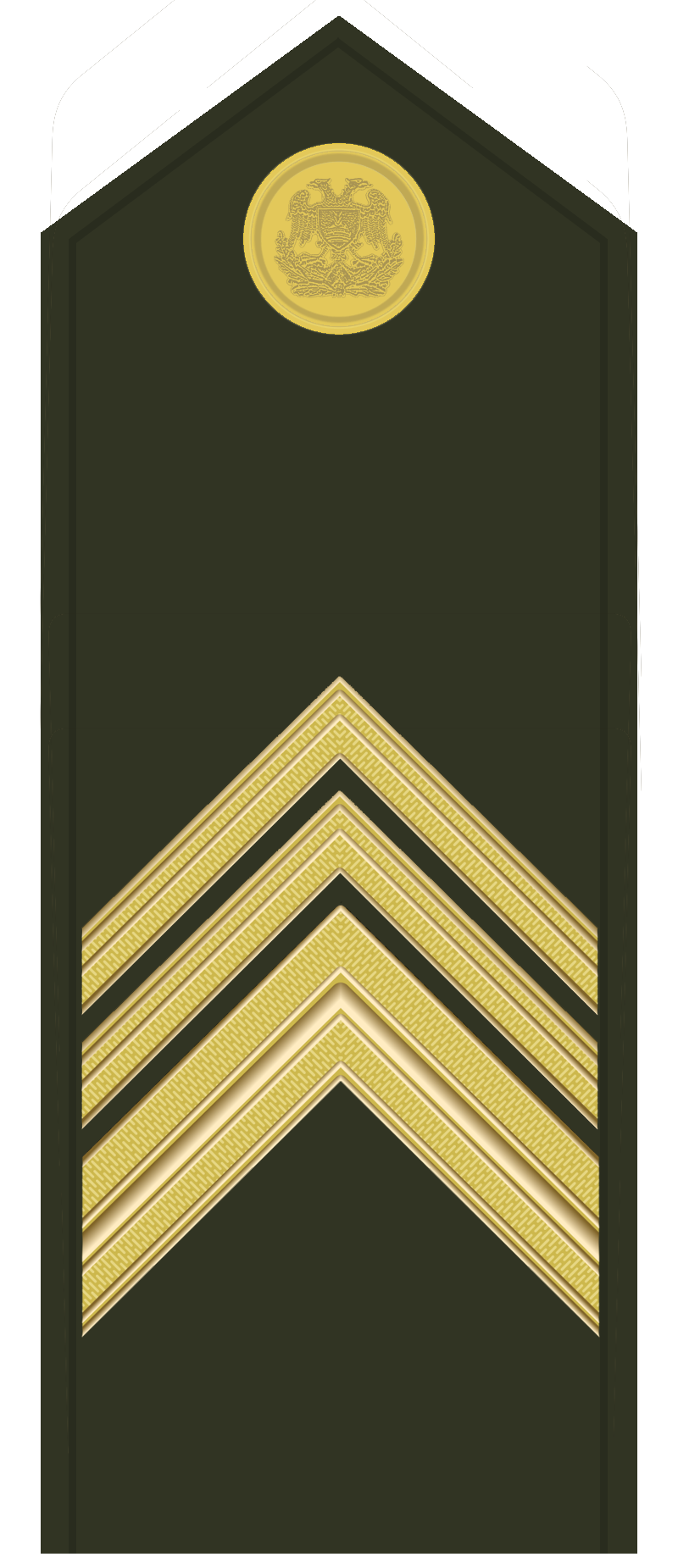
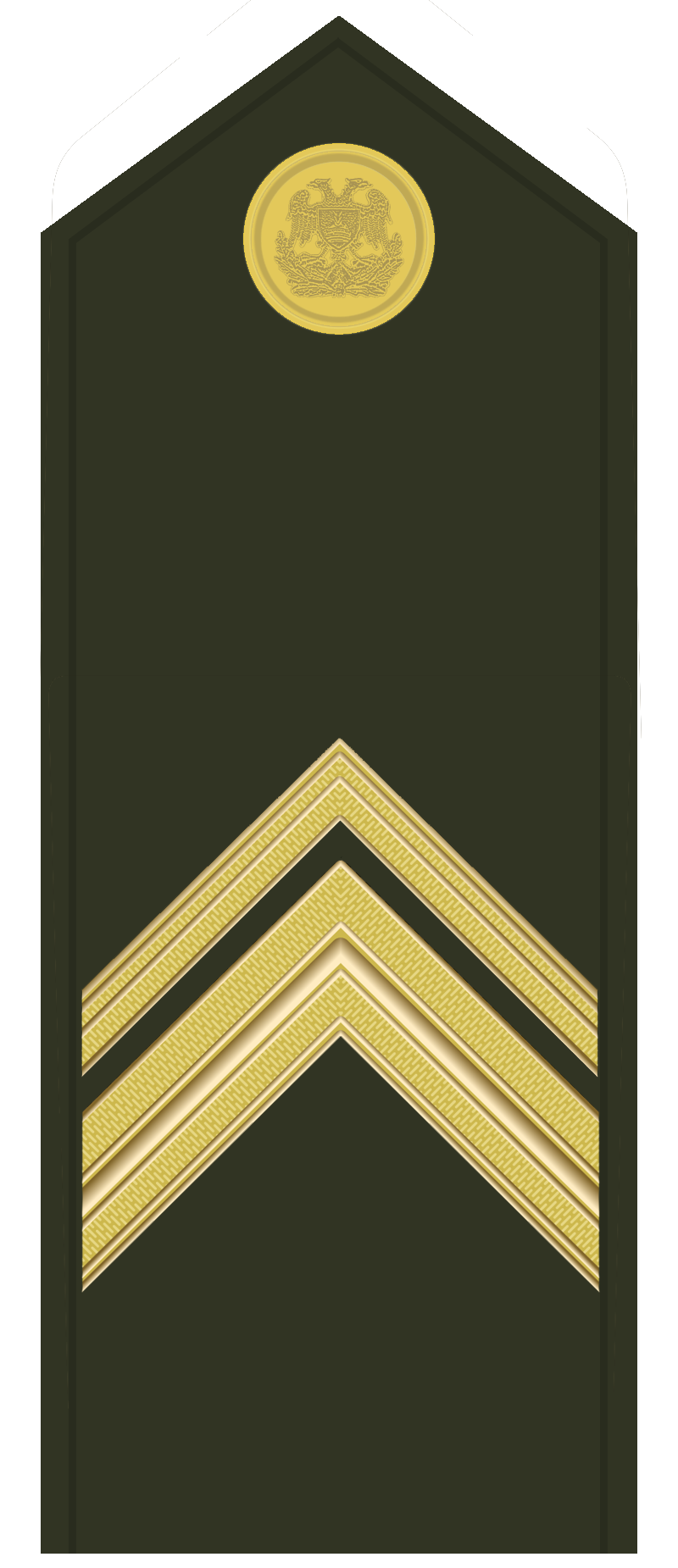
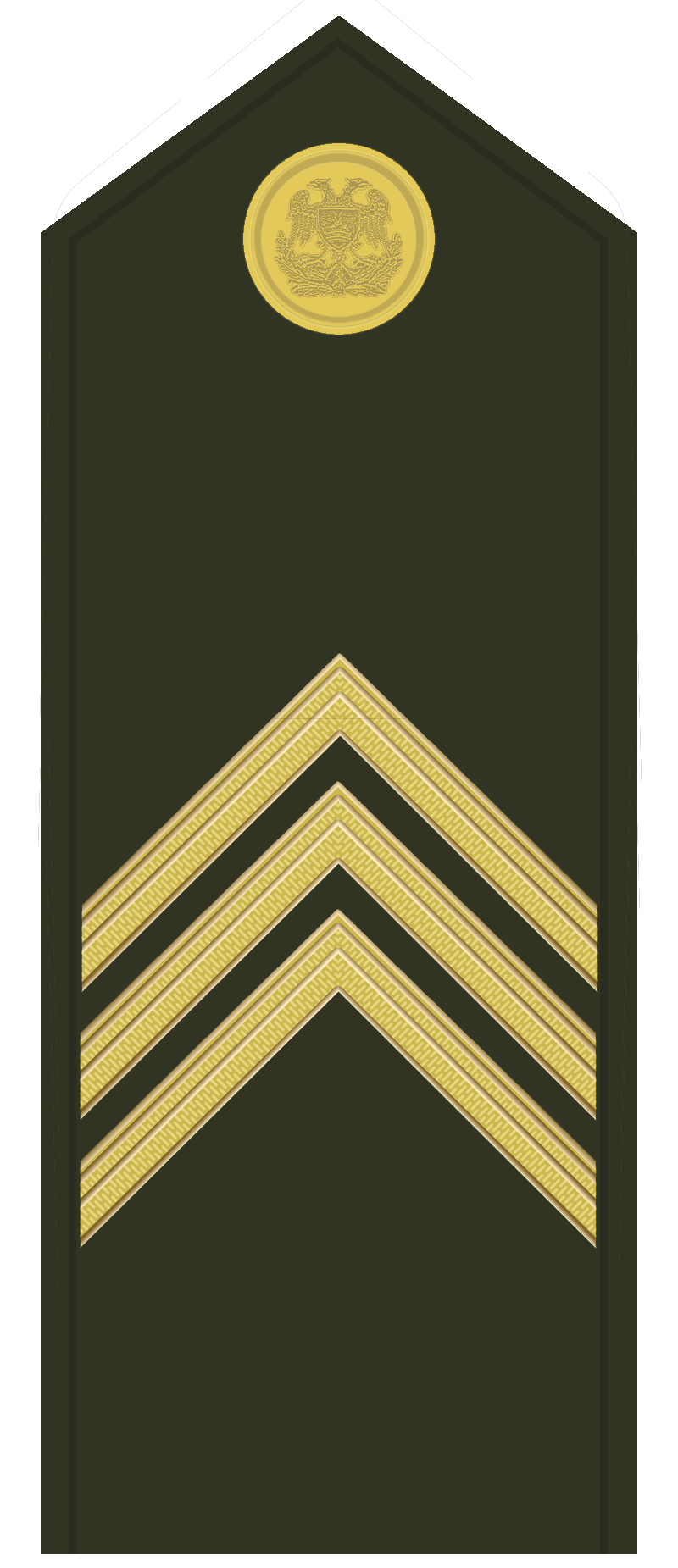
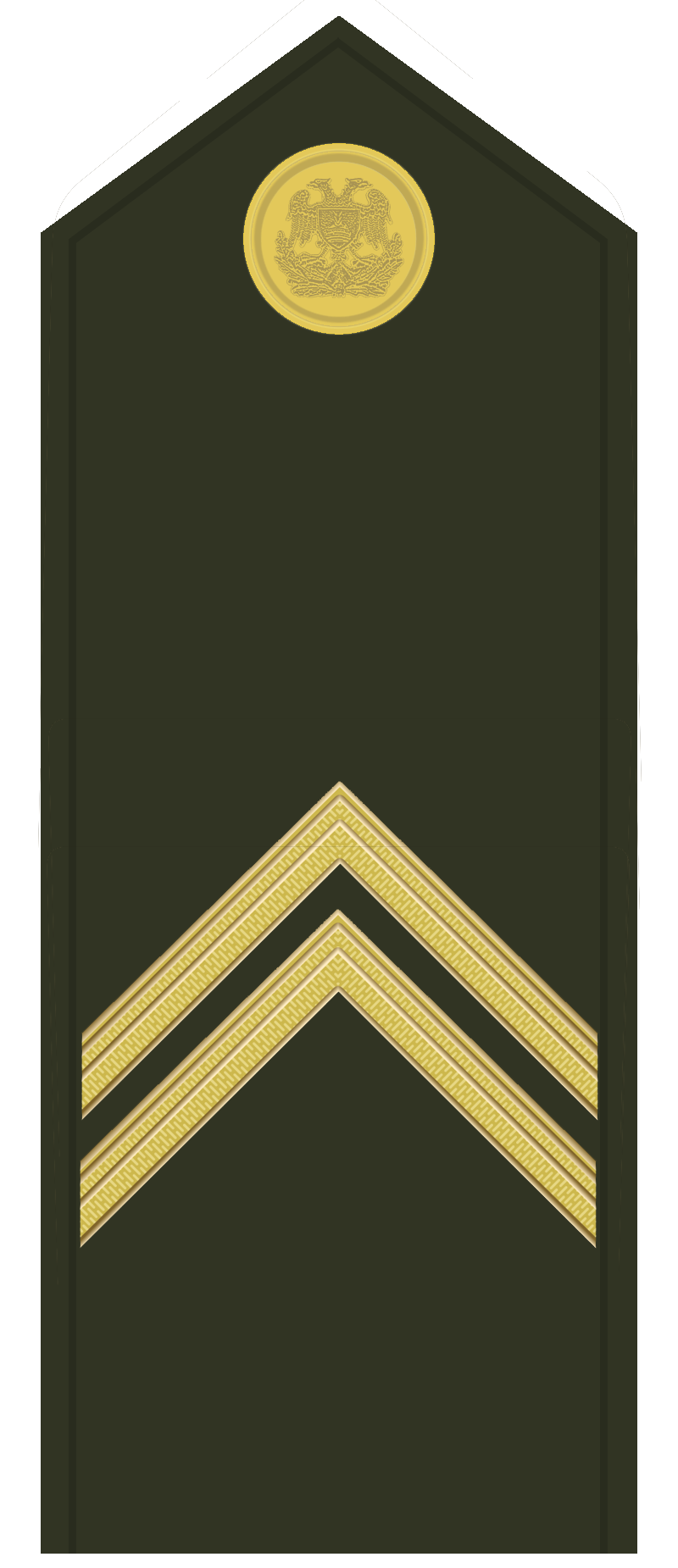
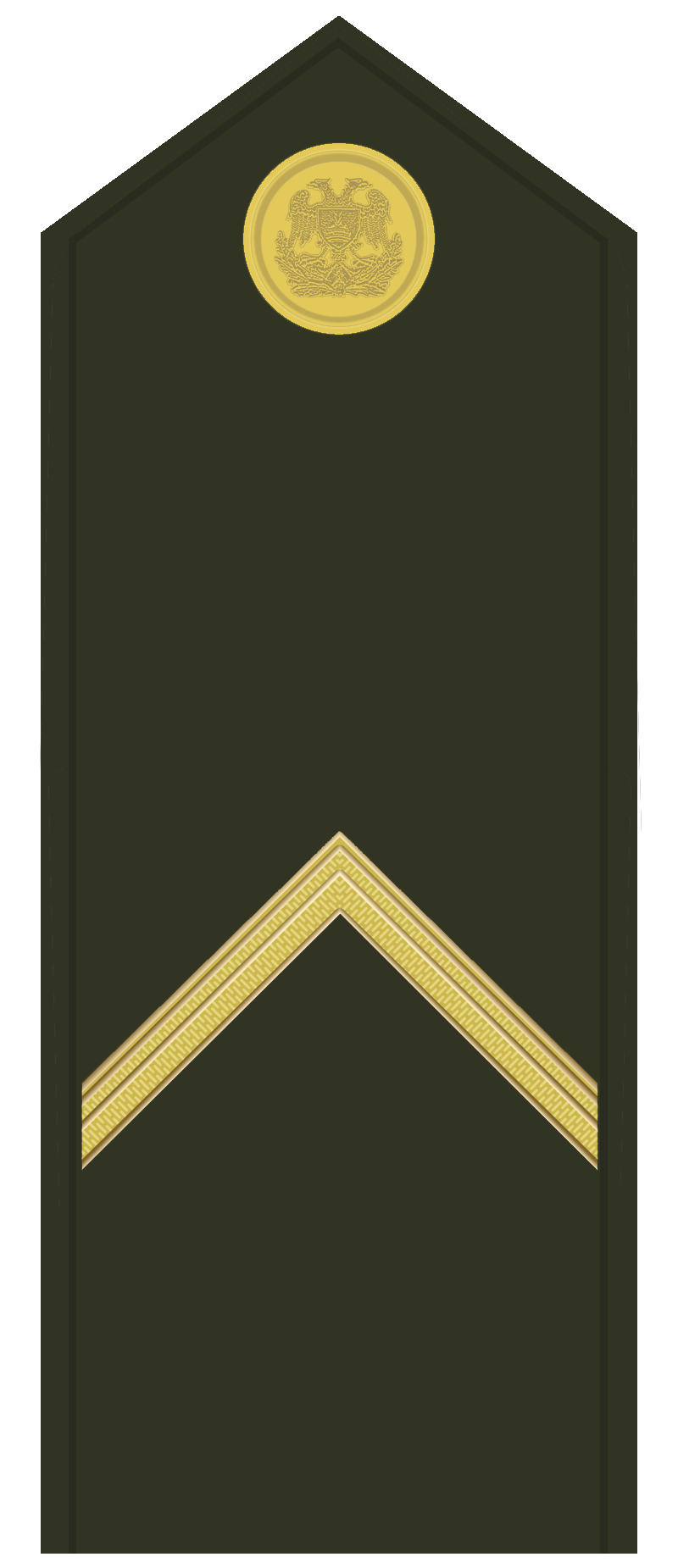
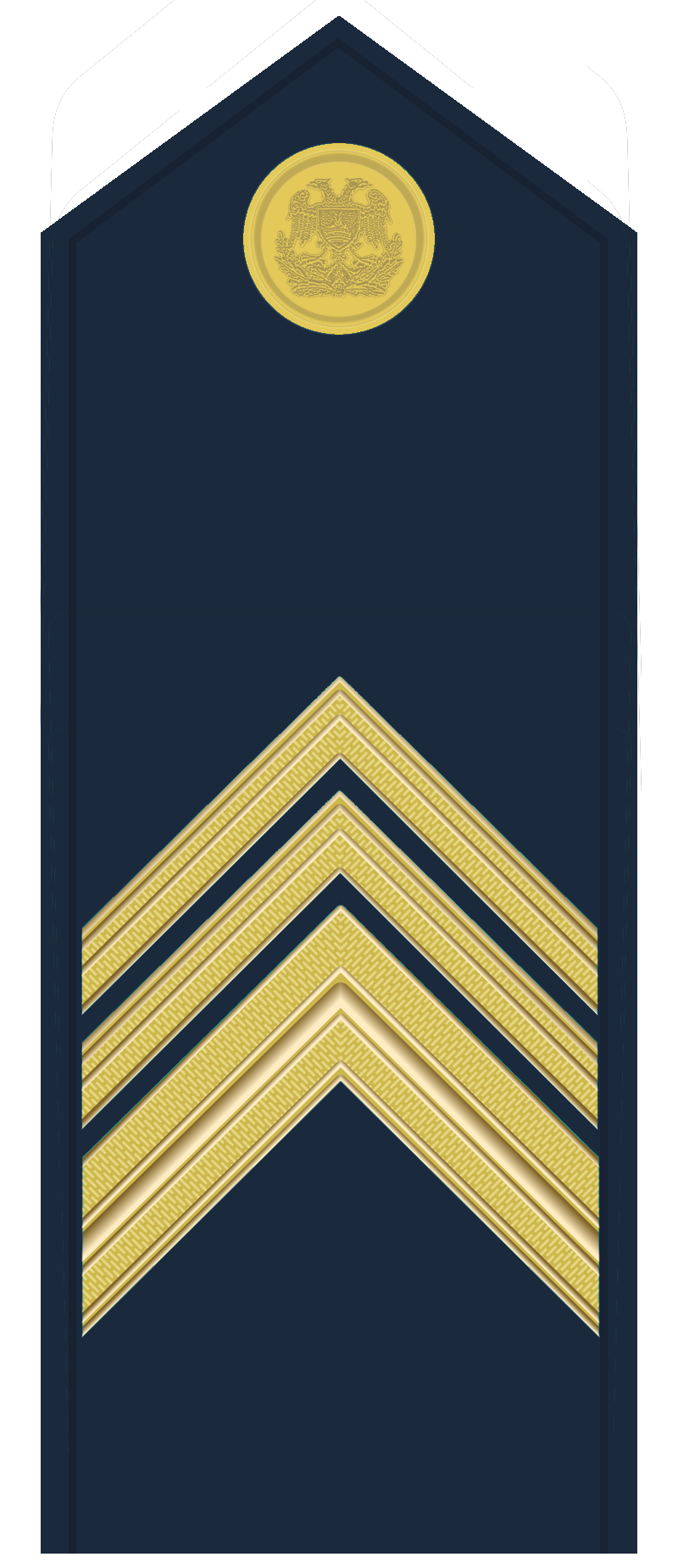
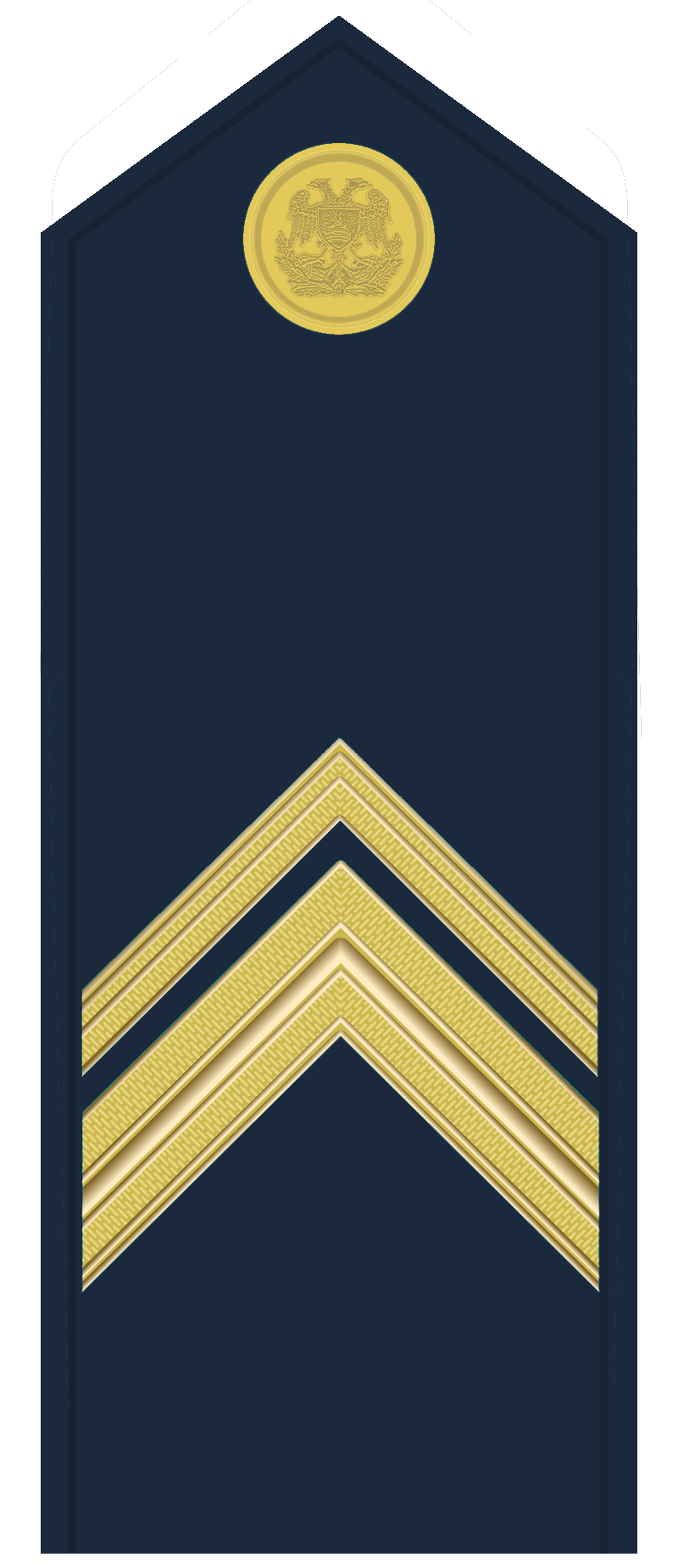
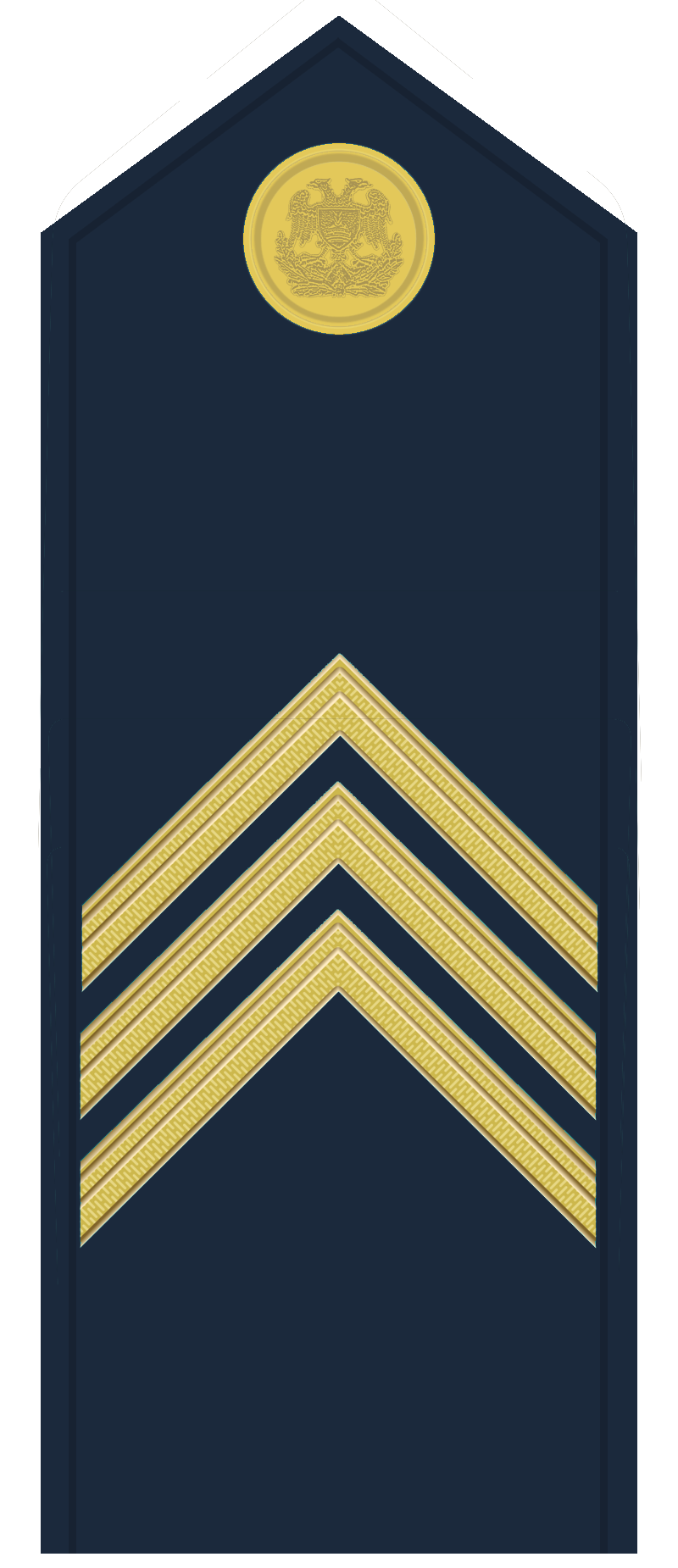
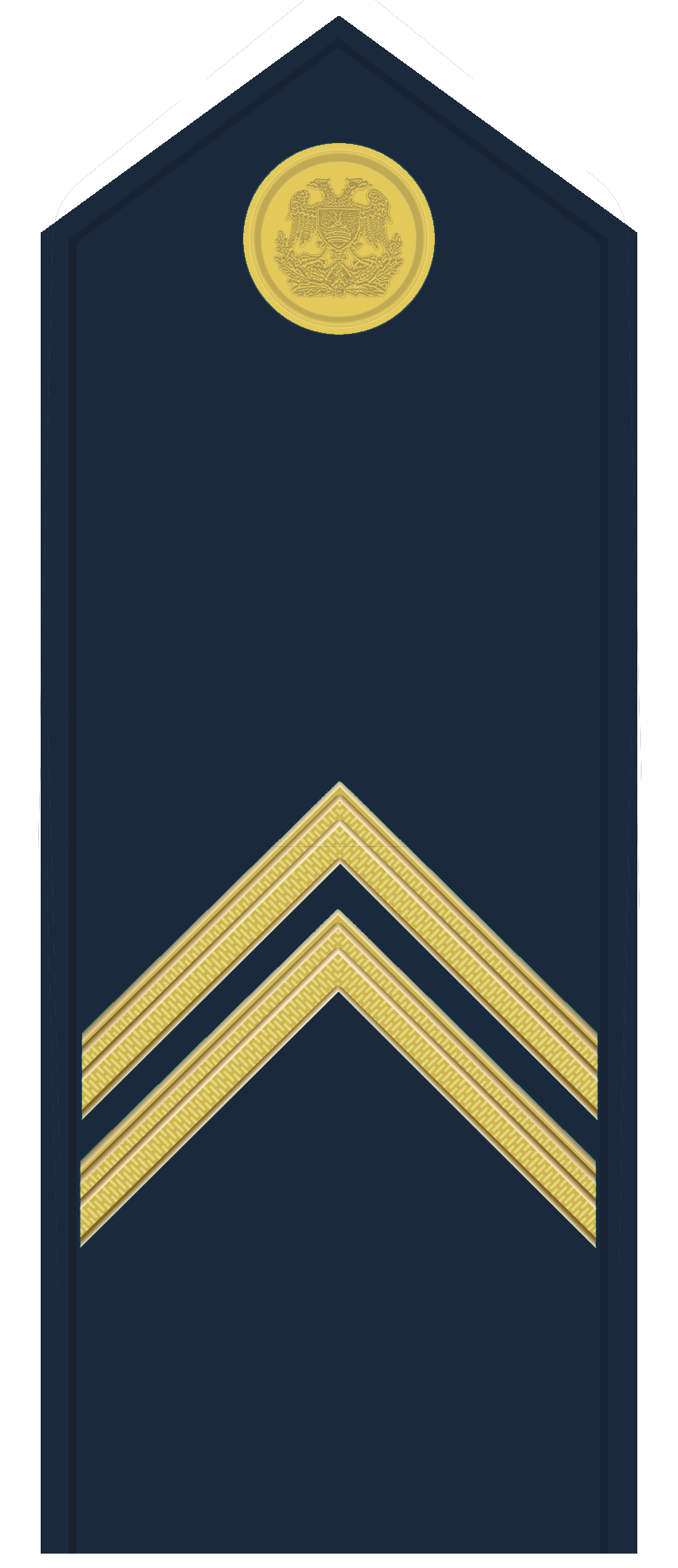
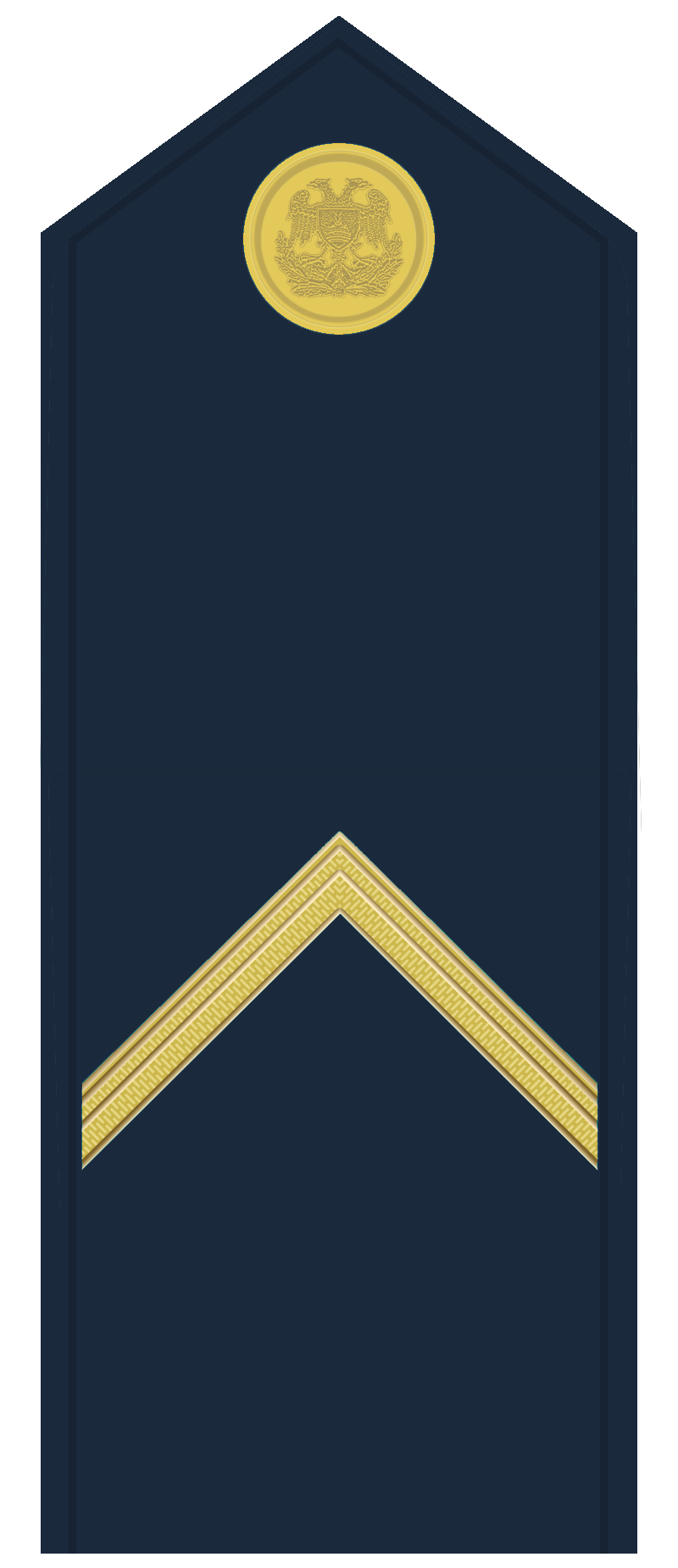
| Rank group | Senior NCOs | | | | Junior NCOs | Enlisted |
|---|---|---|---|---|---|---|
| (Albania) Albanian Land Force | | | | | | No insignia |
| (Albania) Albanian Land Force | Kapter i parë | Kapter | Rreshter i parë | Rreshter | Tetar |
| (Albania) Albanian Air Force | | | | | | No insignia |
| (Albania) Albanian Air Force | Kapter i parë | Kapter | Rreshter i parë | Rreshter | Tetar |

=== 2004–2011 ===
Commissioned officers

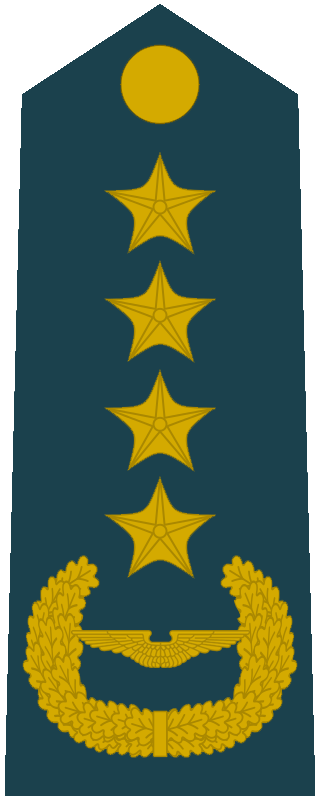
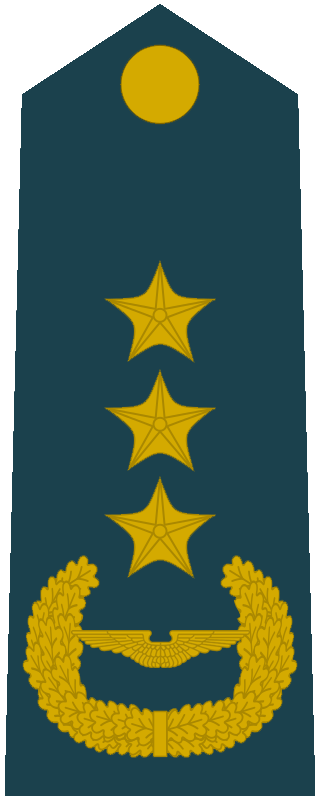
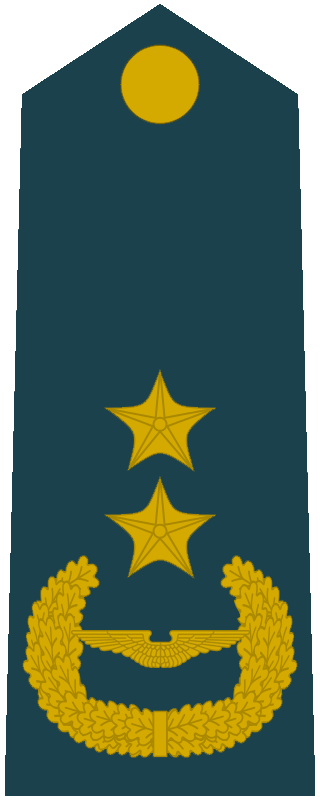
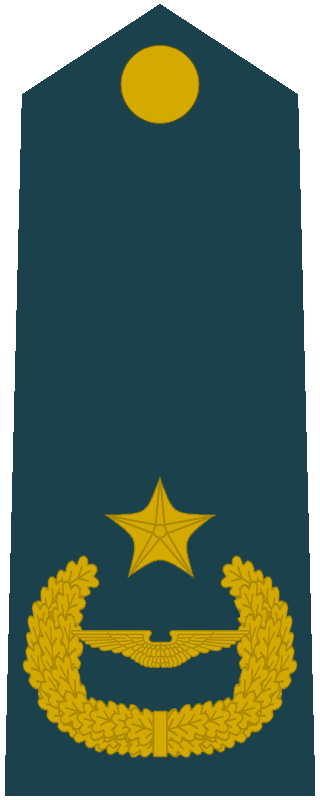
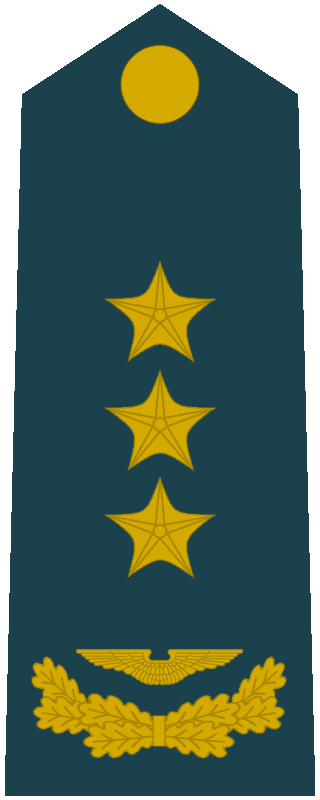
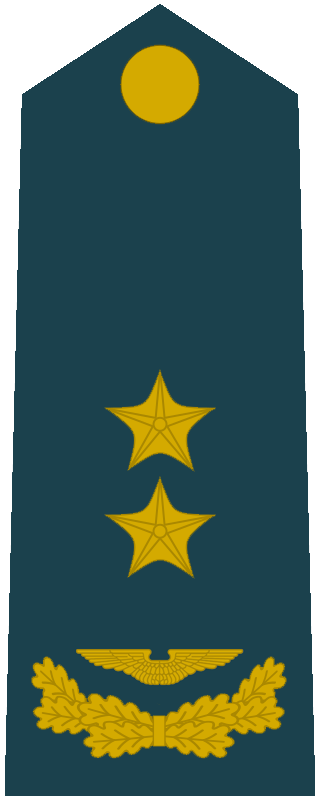
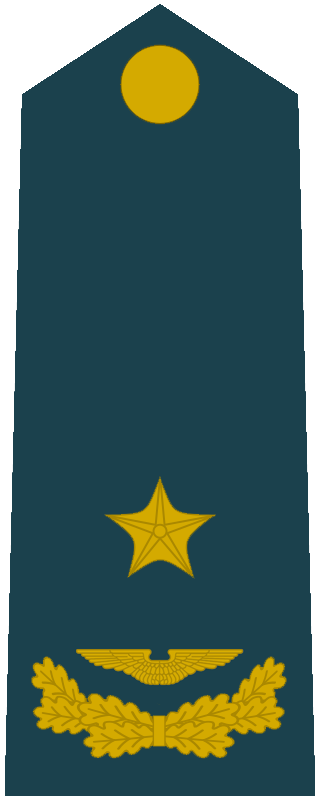
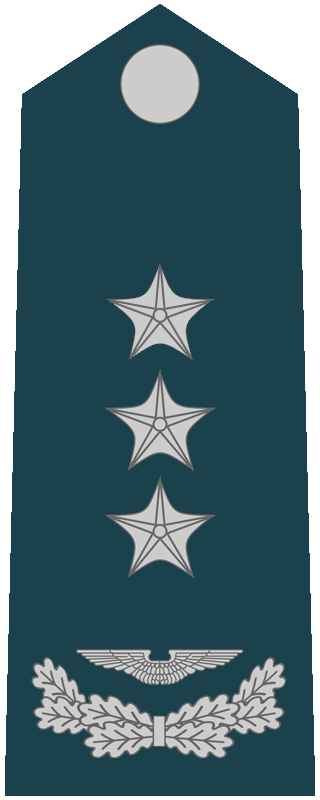
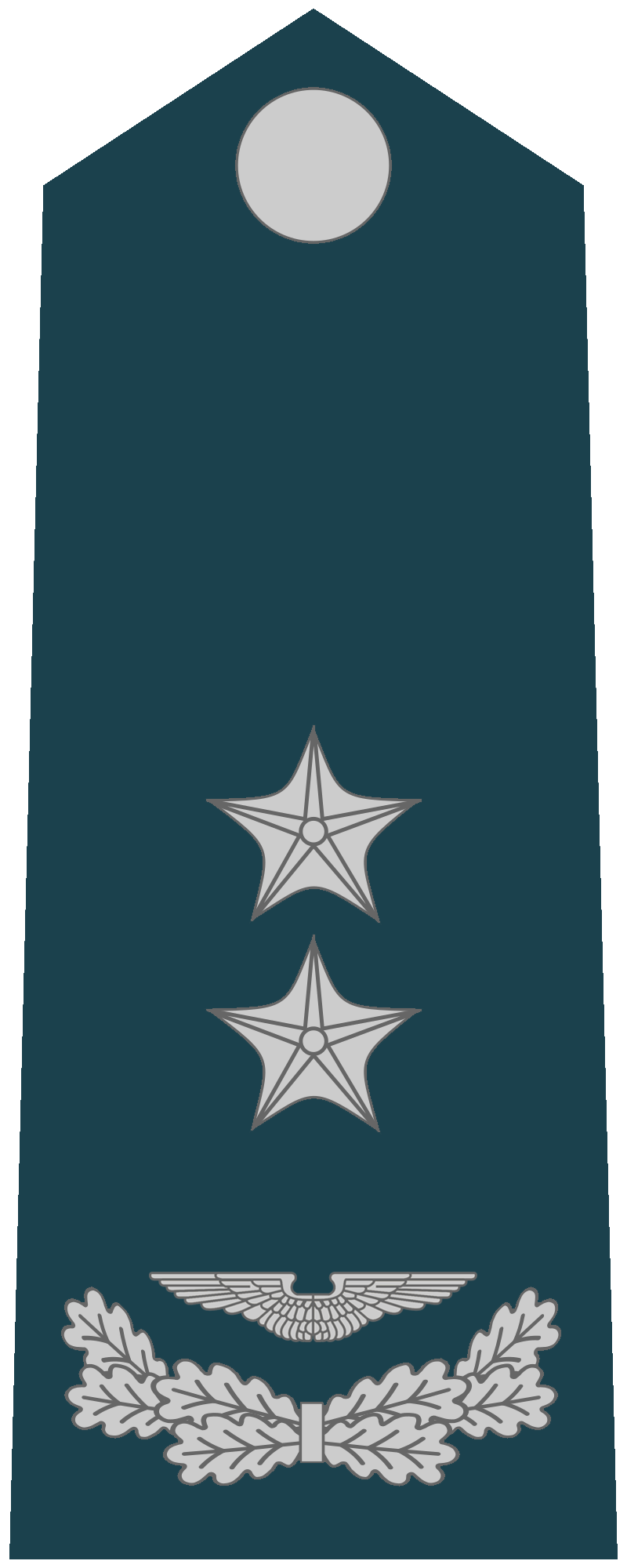
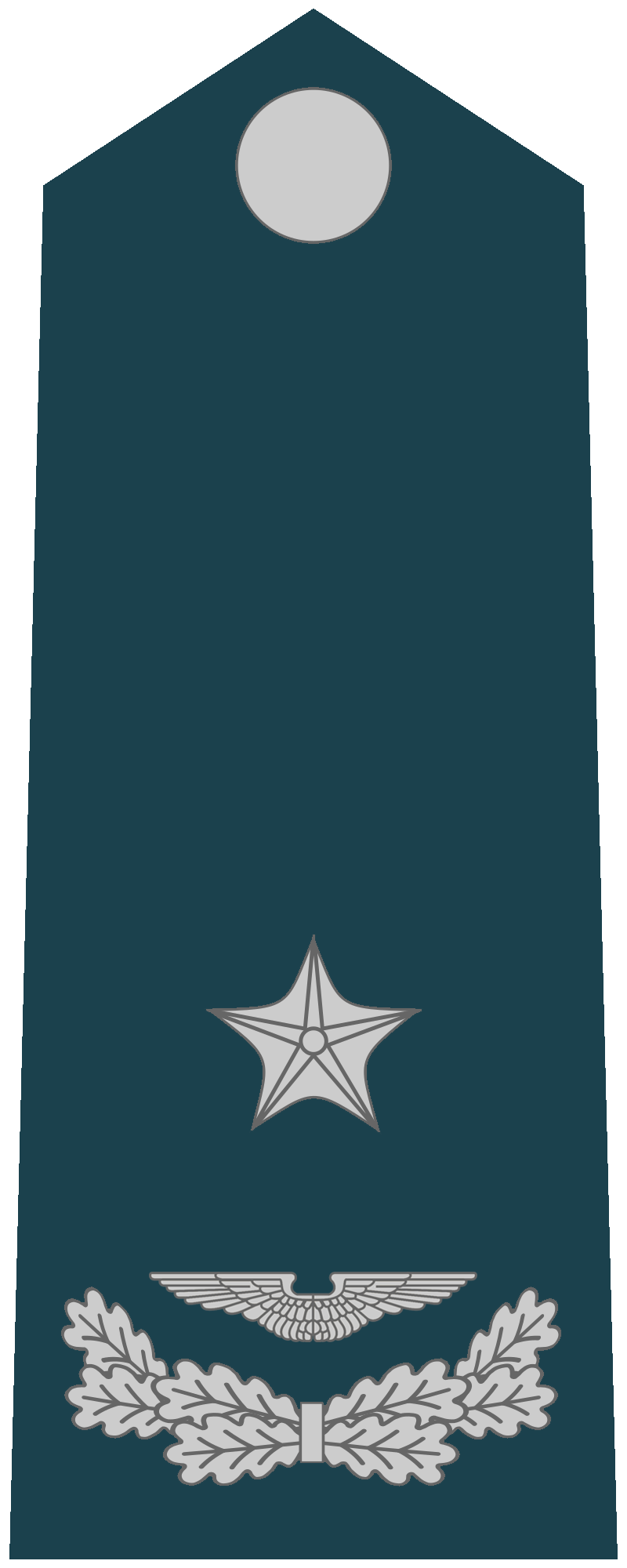
| NATO code | OF-10 | OF-9 | OF-8 | OF-7 | OF-6 | OF-5 | OF-4 | OF-3 | OF-2 | OF-1 |
|---|---|---|---|---|---|---|---|---|---|---|---|
| Albanian Land Force |
| Albanian Land Force | | Gjeneral | Gjeneral Lejtant | Gjeneral Major | Gjeneral Brigade | Kolonel | Nënkolonel | Major | Kapiten | Toger | Nëntoger |
| Albanian Naval Force |
| Albanian Naval Force | | | Admiral | Nënadmiral | Kundëradmiral | Kapiten i Rangut I | Kapiten i Rangut II | Kapiten i Rangut III | Kapiten Lejtnant | Lejtnant | Nënlejtnant |
| Albanian Air Force |
| Albanian Air Force | | Gjeneral | Gjeneral Lejtant | Gjeneral Major | Gjeneral Brigade | Kolonel | Nënkolonel | Major | Kapiten | Toger | Nëntoger |

Enlisted

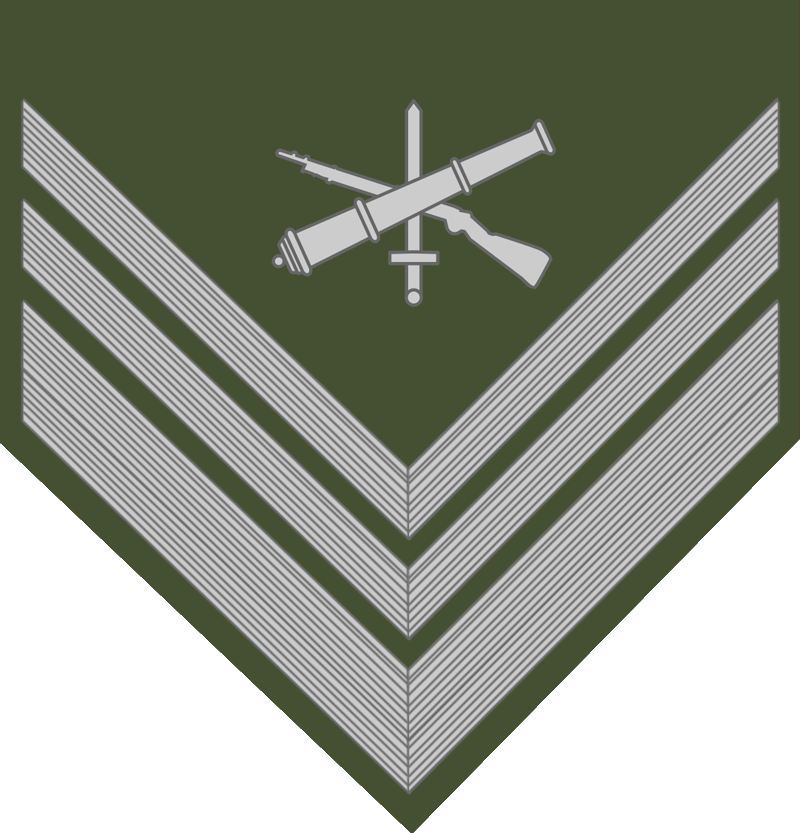
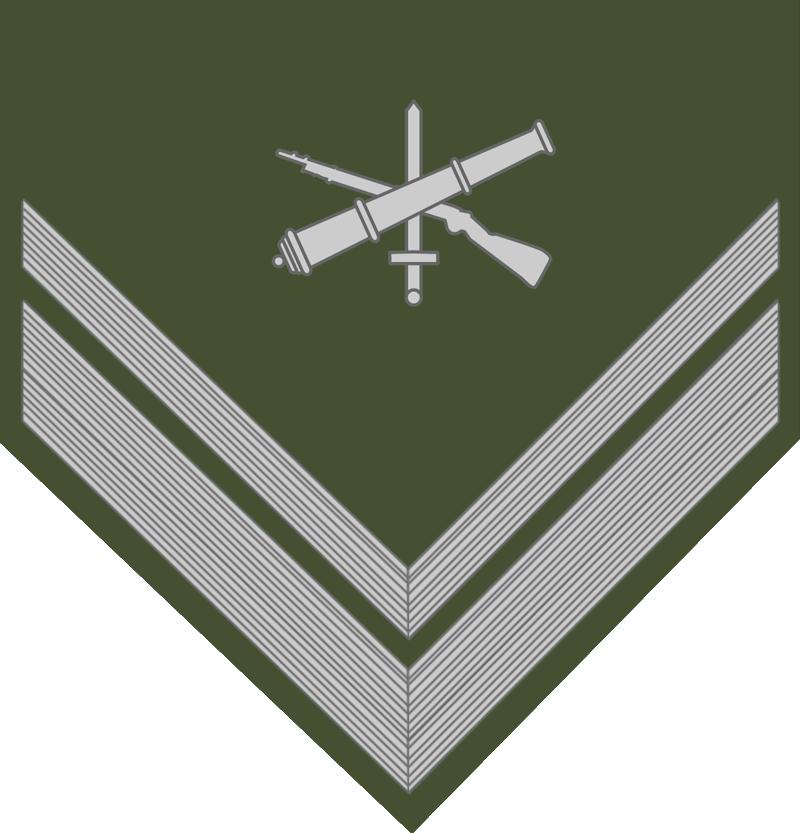
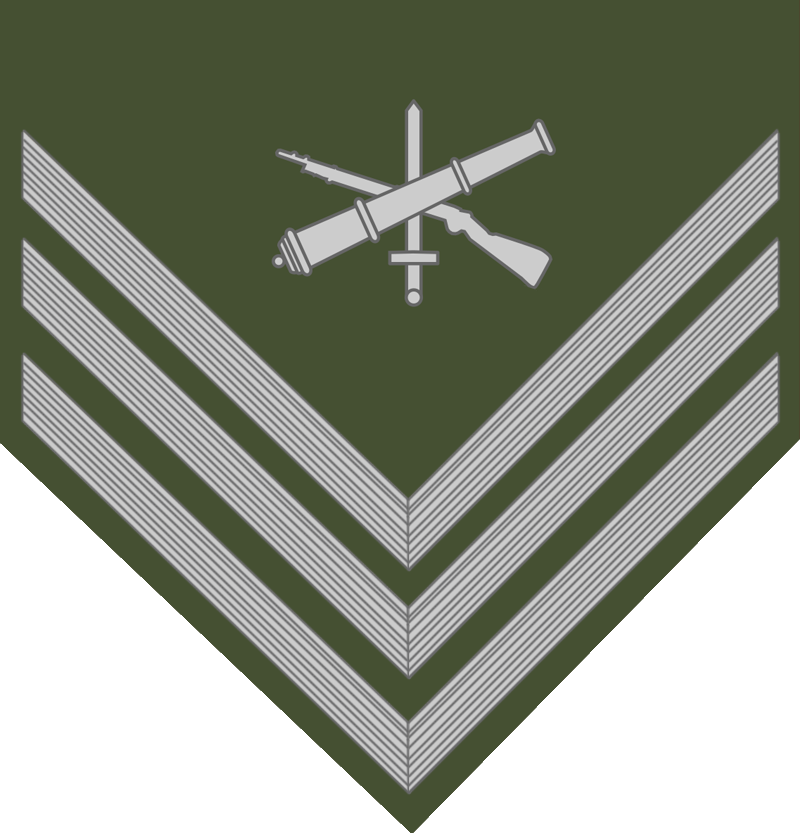
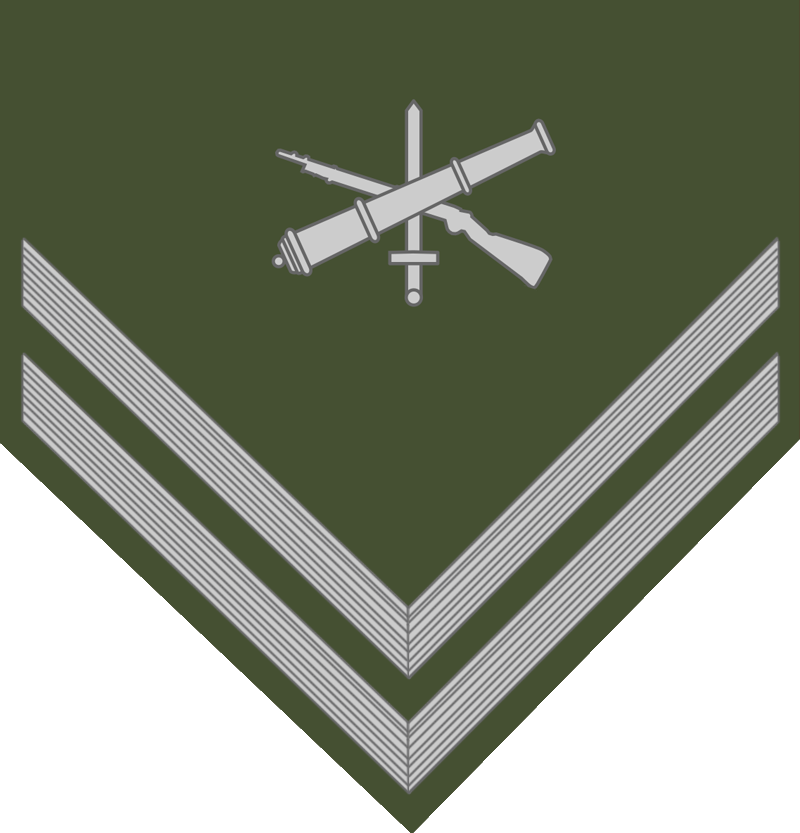
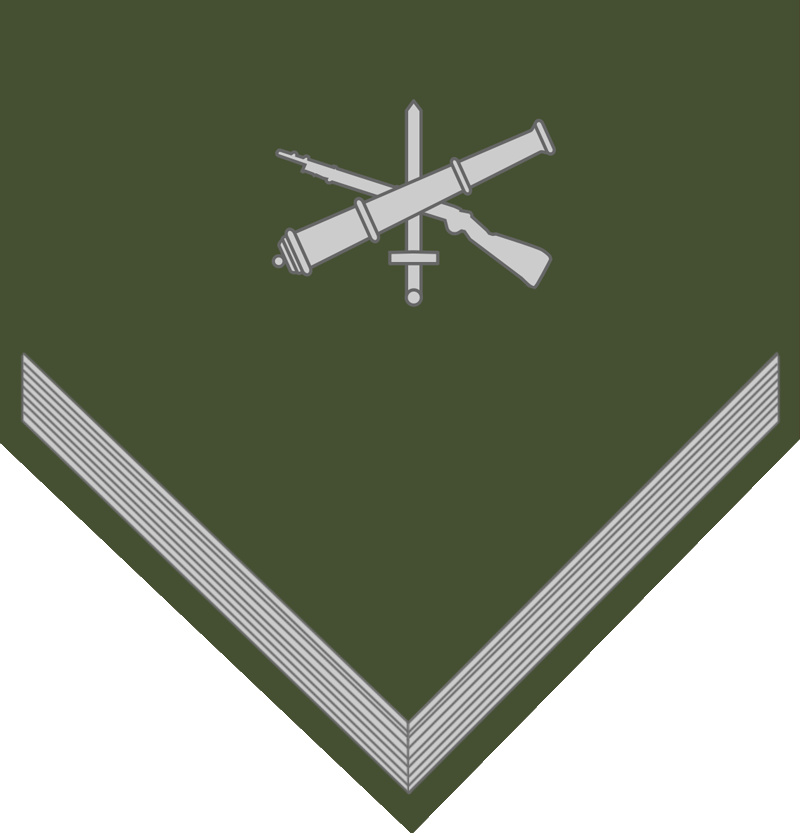
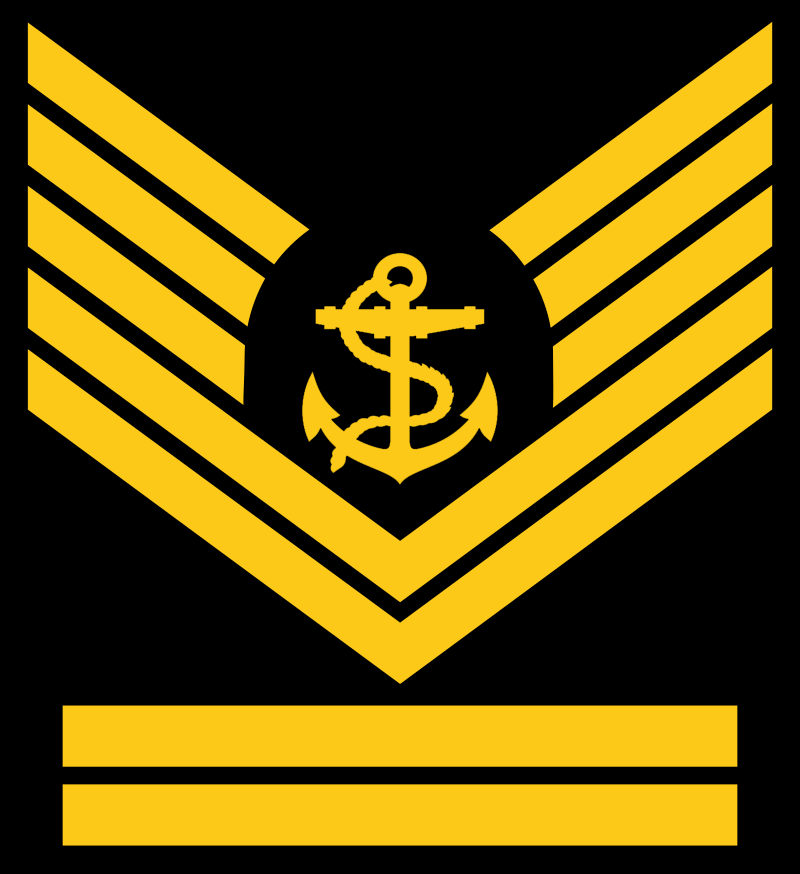
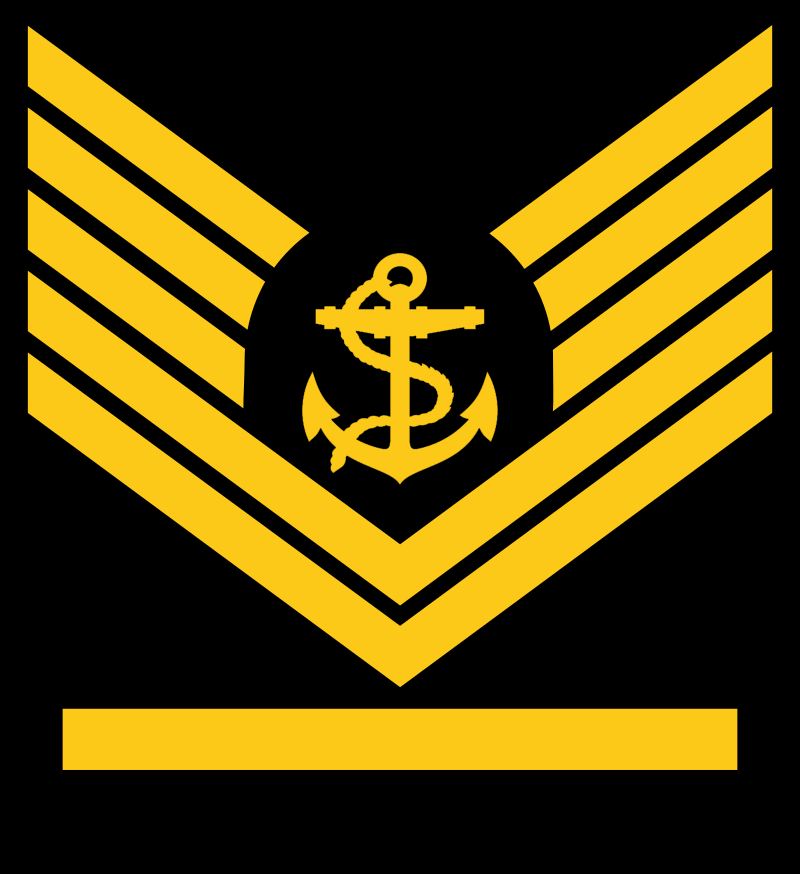
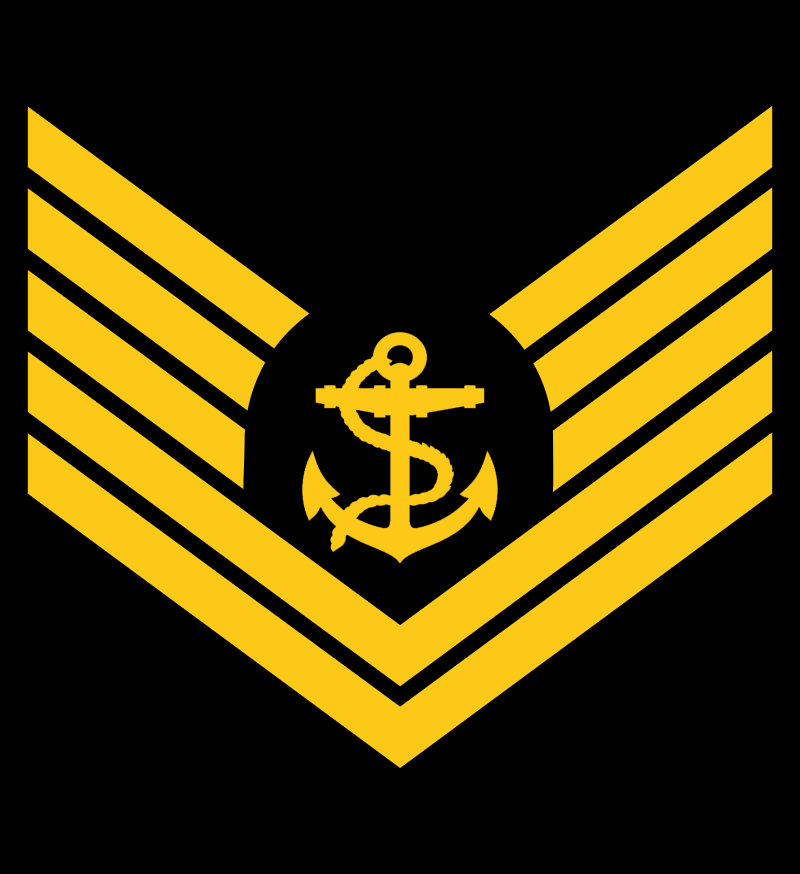
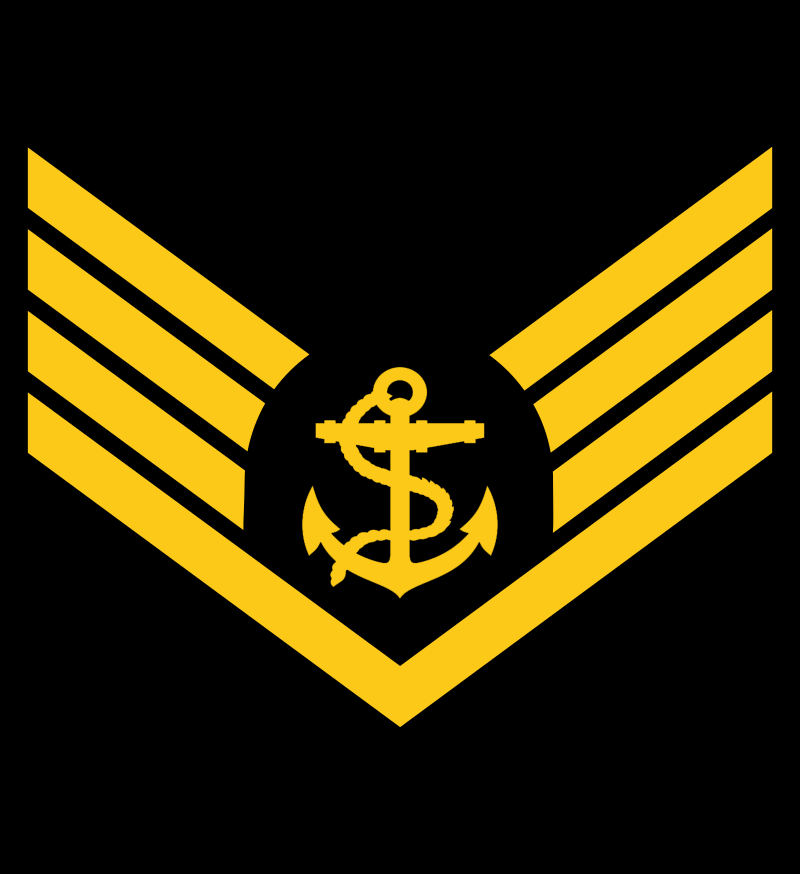
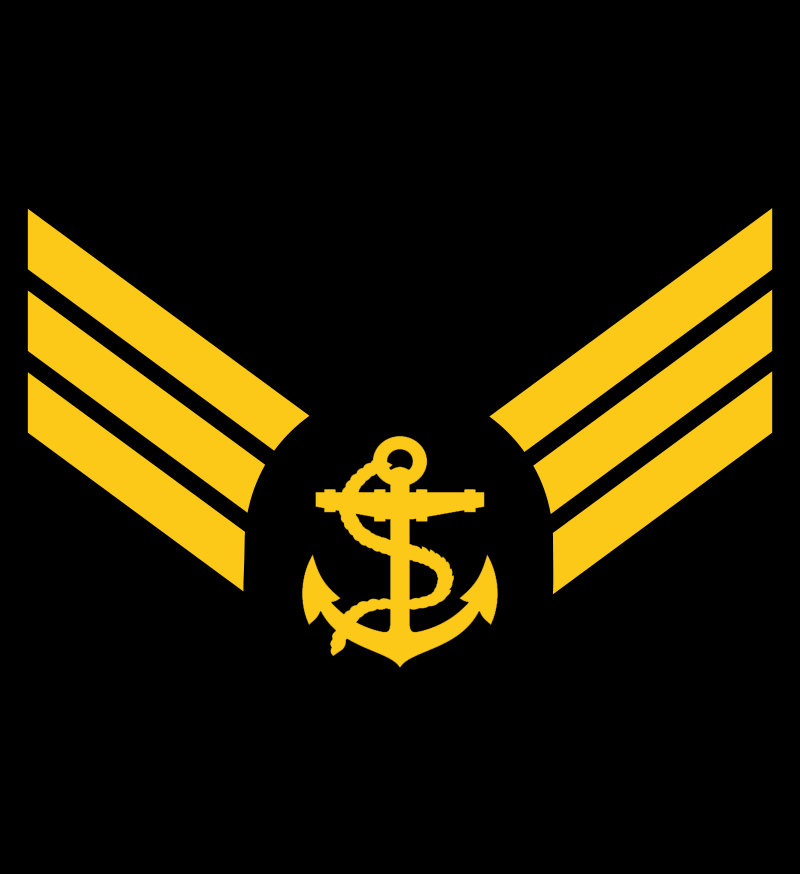
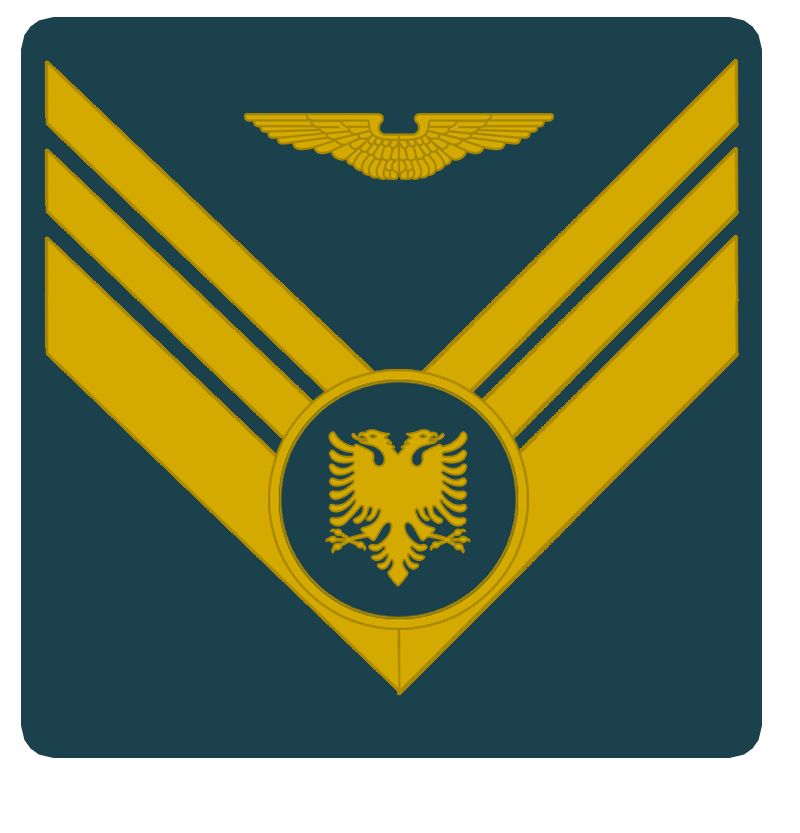
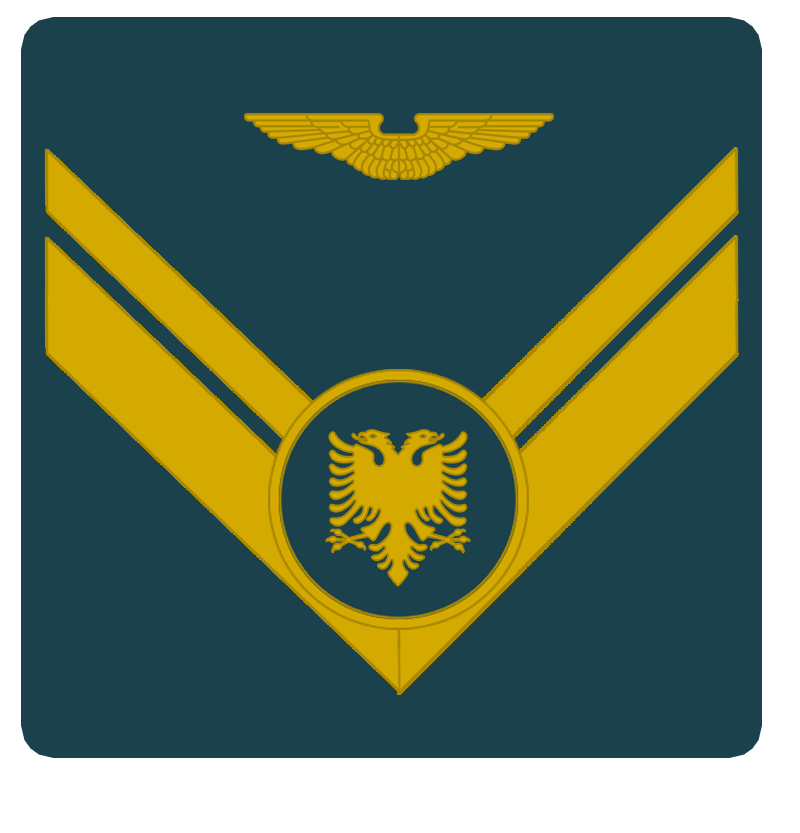
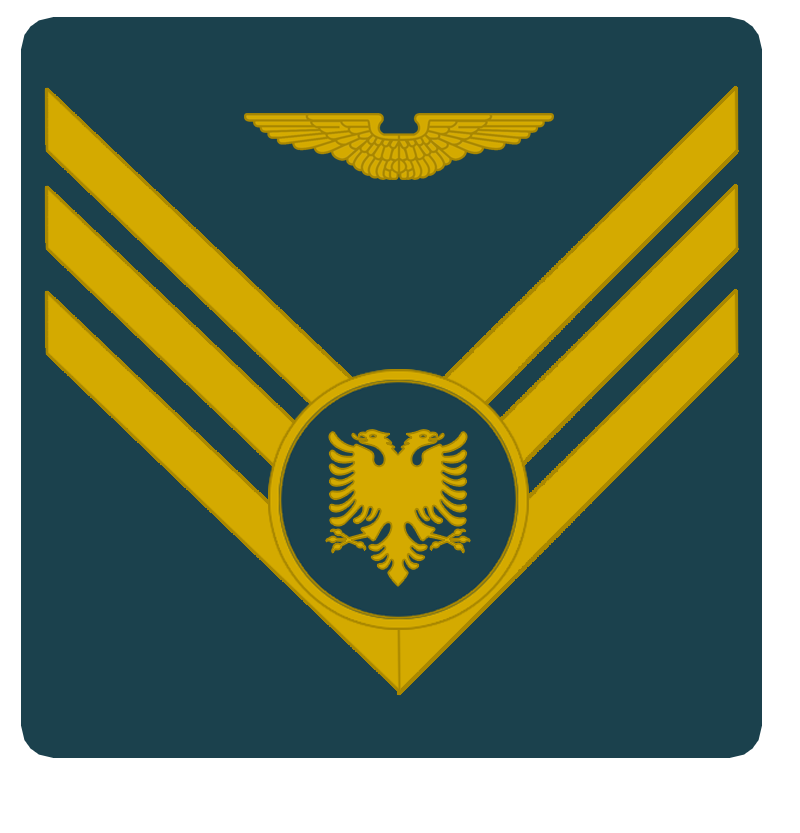
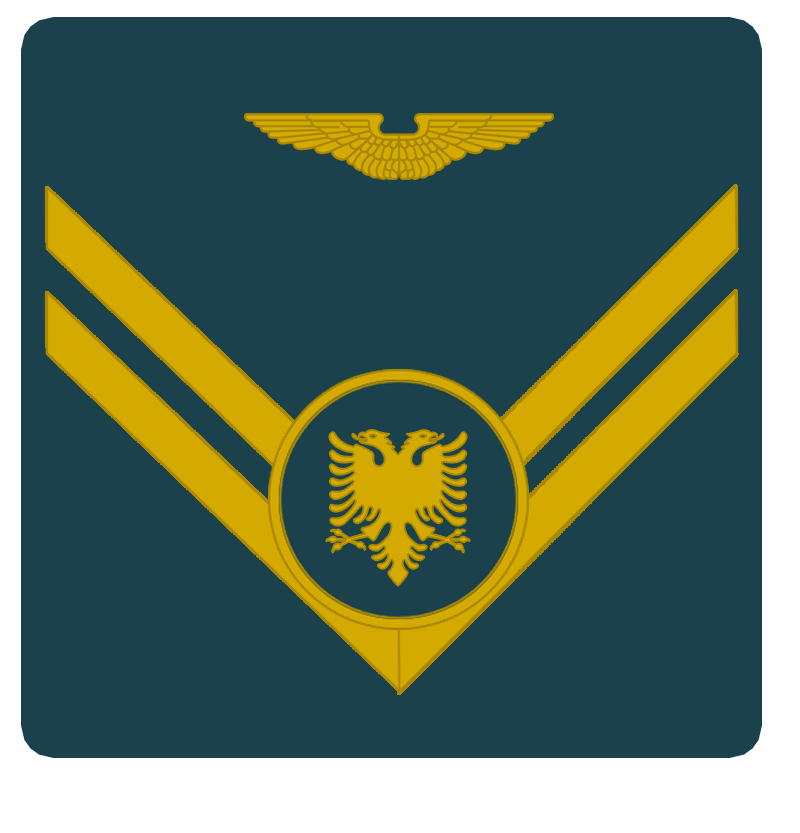
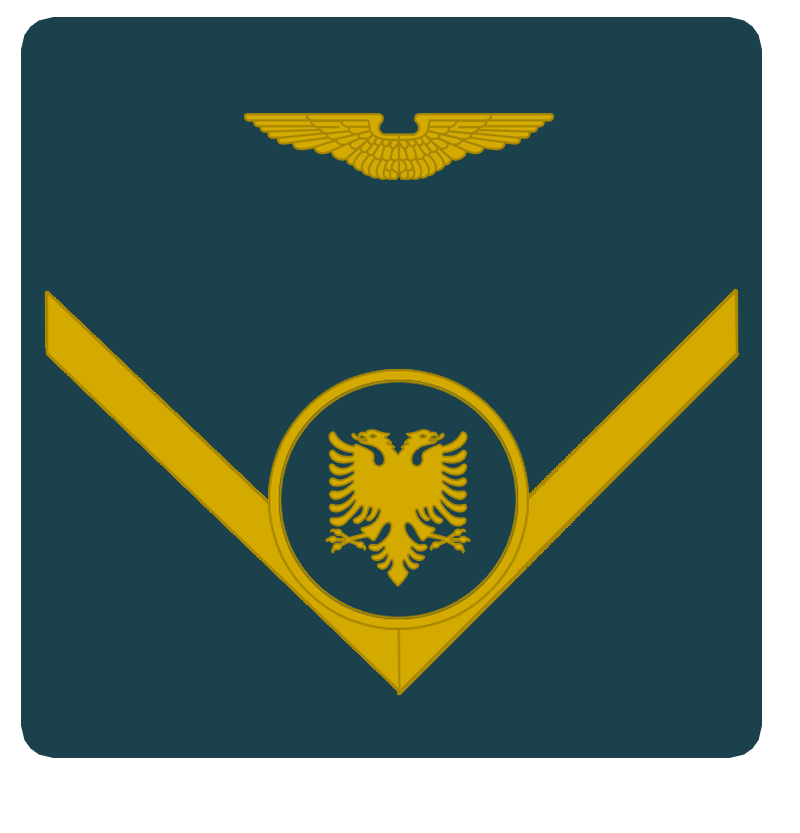
| Rank group | Senior NCOs | | | | Junior NCOs | Enlisted |
|---|---|---|---|---|---|---|
| Albanian Land Force | | | | | | No insignia |
| Albanian Land Force | Kapter i parë | Kapter | Rreshter i parë | Rreshter | Tetar |
| Albanian Naval Force | | | | | | No insignia |
| Albanian Naval Force | Kapter i parë | Kapter | Rreshter Katëri | Rreshter | Tetar |
| Albanian Air Force | | | | | | No insignia |
| Albanian Air Force | Kapter i parë | Kapter | Rreshter i parë | Rreshter | Tetar |
