= Albania at the Olympics =

- IOC code: ALB
- NOC: Albanian National Olympic Committee
- Website: nocalbania.org.al (in Albanian)
- Medals: Gold 0 Silver 0 Bronze 2 Total 2

Summer appearances
- 1972; 1976–1988; 1992; 1996; 2000; 2004; 2008; 2012; 2016; 2020; 2024; 2028

Winter appearances
- 2006; 2010; 2014; 2018; 2022; 2026

Albania first participated at the Summer Olympic Games in 1972. After that, Albania boycotted the next four games for political reasons, as part of the 1980 Summer Olympics boycott, 1984 Summer Olympics boycott, 1988 Summer Olympics boycott, and the isolationist stance of Albania at the time. The nation returned for the Barcelona 1992 Summer Olympics and has appeared in all games since then. Also the nation made its debut at the Winter Olympic Games in 2006. Albania normally competes in events that include swimming, athletics, weightlifting, shooting, and wrestling. They have been represented by the Albanian National Olympic Committee since 1972.

Albania won two bronze medals in wrestling at the 2024 Summer Olympics. Its first ever Olympic medal came on 10 August 2024 when Chermen Valiev won bronze in the men's freestyle 74 kg and second medal came on 11 August 2024 when Islam Dudaev won bronze in the men's freestyle 65 kg.

== History ==
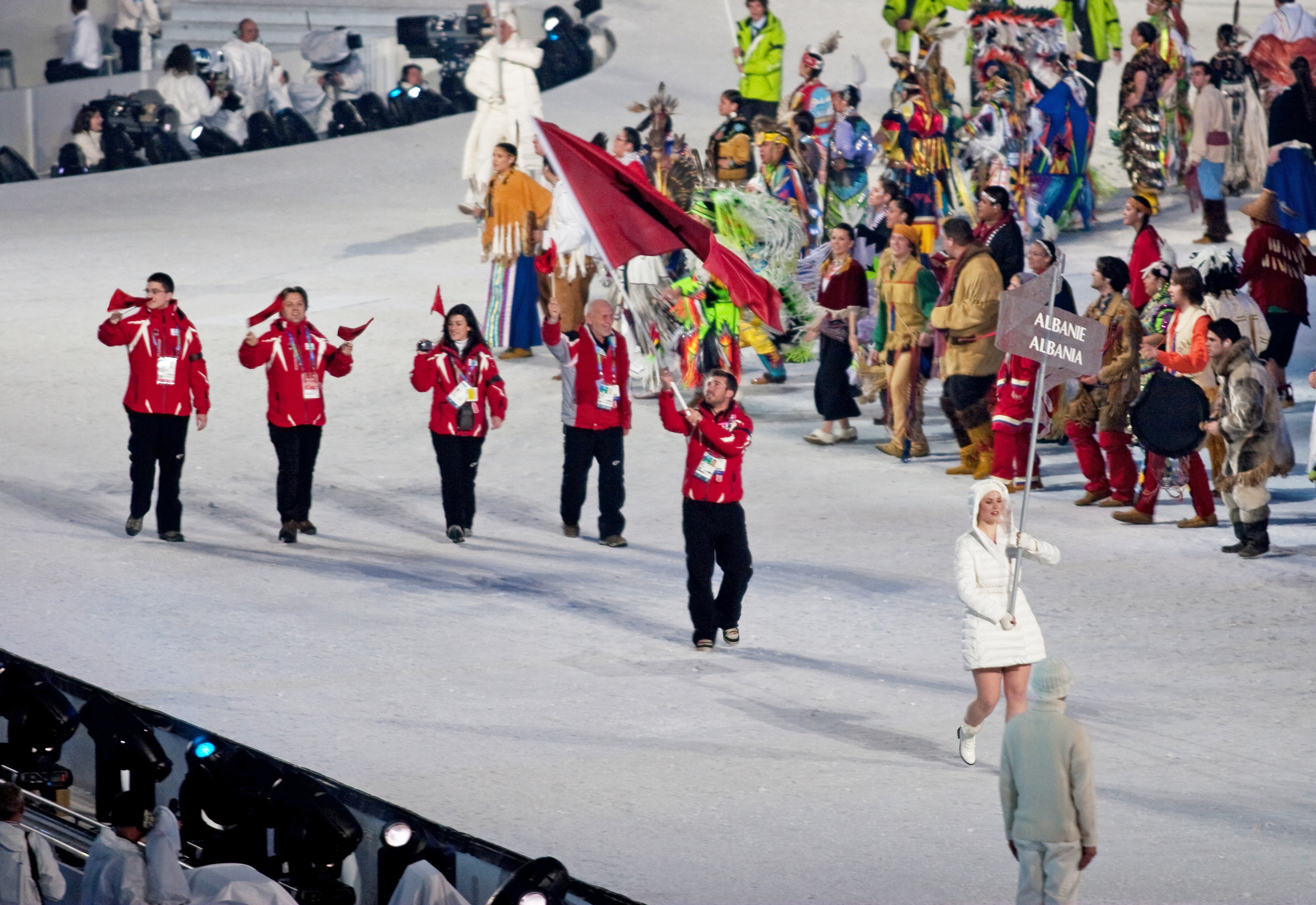
Albania's delegation at the 2010 Winter Games

Albania first officially competed at the Munich 1972 Summer Olympics with five participants over two events; Fatos Pilkati and Afërdita Tusha in the mixed 50 metre free pistol, Ismail Rama and Beqir Kosova in the mixed 50 metre rifle, prone, and Ymer Pampuri in the men's 60 kg weightlifting. The weightlifter Ymer Pampuri became the first and only Albanian to break an Olympic record, in military press, after lifting 127.5 kg respectively.

In the 1992 Barcelona Summer Olympics Albania sent 7 athletes: Alma Qeramixhi competed in the heptathlon; Kristo Robo in the 25 metre rapid fire pistol; Enkelejda Shehu in the 25 metre pistol; Frank Leskaj in the 50 metre freestyle, 100 metre freestyle, and 100 metre breaststroke; Sokol Bishanaku and Fatmir Bushi in the under 67.5 kg weightlifting; and Dede Dekaj in the under 110 kg weightlifting.

For the 1996 Summer Olympics in Atlanta, Albania sent seven athletes—4 female and 3 male. Mirela Manjani was the flag bearer for the Olympic Games that year. At the 2000 Summer Olympics in Sydney, Albania's delegation consisted of two male and two female athletes. They had seven competitors (two female, five male) in the Athens 2004 Summer Olympics. In Beijing at the 2008 Summer Olympics, the nation sent eleven athletes (four female and seven male), their highest ever total.

For the London 2012 Summer Olympics, Albania sent nine athletes consisting of three women and six men. Romela Begaj, who was the flag bearer for Albania at the 2012 Summer Olympics, competed in the women's 58 kg weightlifting category finishing in 9th after lifting 216 kg in total.

Briken Calja achieved the best result for Albania at the 2012 Summer Olympics, finishing 6th in men's 69 kg weightlifting after lifting 320 kg. He competed in the 2016 Summer Olympics, finishing in 5th place in the men's 69 kg weightlifting after lifting 326 kg. Calja would compete at the following 2020 Summer Olympics in the men's 73 kg weightlifting category. The European Weightlifting champion in 2018 would finish in 4th after lifting 341 kg. His 4th-place finish was the best result in the history for Albania at the Summer Olympics until 2024. Also, in the 2020 Summer Olympics Luiza Gega became the first athlete from Albania to qualify for the finals in athletics. She finished in 5th place in the heats for the Women's 3000 metres steeplechase with a time of 9:23.85, a season's best. In the final run, Gega finished in 13th place.

In the 2024 Summer Olympics in Paris, Albania won their first-ever medals of the Olympic Games. Two Russian-born athletes with Albanian citizenship, Chermen Valiev and Islam Dudaev, won bronze medals competing for Albania in men's freestyle 74 kg and men's freestyle 65 kg, respectively.

=== Participation in Olympic qualifiers ===
In 1964, Albania participated for the first time in qualifiers for the football tournament at the Olympics. Albania faced Bulgaria in the opening round, losing both matches 1–0 and failing to qualify for the next round. Albania participated in the qualifiers for the football tournament at the 1972 Summer Olympics. They faced Romania in the opening round, losing both legs 2-1, despite goals from Medin Zhega and Panajot Pano, respectively.

Albania men's national basketball team has tried twice to qualify in basketball at the Summer Olympics. In 1972, Albania participated in the Olympic qualifiers for basketball. They played three qualifying matches, losing all three games, however two were close encounters, with Albania losing 83–82 against Belgium and 84–81 against the Netherlands. This was Albania's best-ever Olympic qualification attempt in their Basketball History. Albania next participated in the basketball qualifiers 20 years later in 1992 competing in Group B. Albania secured their first win at this competition against Switzerland 84–85, which was their only win in their campaign. Albania failed to qualify for the Olympics, with a 5th-place finish in the group. Albania has never participated in an Olympic Team sport discipline.

== Albanian international medalists ==
Mirela Manjani competed for Albania in the women's javelin throw at the 1996 Summer Olympics in Atlanta, finishing 24th. After marrying a Greek citizen in 1997, she won a silver medal at the 2000 Summer Olympics and a bronze medal at the 2004 Summer Olympics while representing Greece. Majlinda Kelmendi competed for Albania at the 2012 Summer Olympics in judo, defeating Jaana Sundberg from Finland in the first round before losing to Mauritian judoka Legentil. Four years later she won Kosovo's first ever gold medal at the 2016 Olympic Games in Rio de Janeiro, winning her final match against Odette Giuffrida.

== Medal tables ==
=== Medals by Summer Games ===
Games	Athletes	Gold	Silver	Bronze	Total	Rank
1972 Munich	5	0	0	0	0	–
1976–1988	did not participate					
1992 Barcelona	7	0	0	0	0	–
1996 Atlanta	7	0	0	0	0	–
2000 Sydney	4	0	0	0	0	–
2004 Athens	7	0	0	0	0	–
2008 Beijing	11	0	0	0	0	–
2012 London	11	0	0	0	0	–
2016 Rio de Janeiro	6	0	0	0	0	–
2020 Tokyo	9	0	0	0	0	–
2024 Paris	8	0	0	2	2	80
2028 Los Angeles	future event					
2032 Brisbane	future event					
Total		0	0	2	2	148

=== Medals by Winter Games ===
Games	Athletes	Gold	Silver	Bronze	Total	Rank
2006 Turin	1	0	0	0	0	–
2010 Vancouver	1	0	0	0	0	–
2014 Sochi	2	0	0	0	0	–
2018 Pyeongchang	2	0	0	0	0	–
2022 Beijing	1	0	0	0	0	–
2026 Milano Cortina	4	0	0	0	0	–
2030 French Alps	future event					
2034 Utah	future event					
Total		0	0	0	0	–

=== Medals by summer sport ===
Sport	Gold	Silver	Bronze	Total
Wrestling	0	0	2	2
Totals (1 entries)	0	0	2	2

== List of medalists ==
Medal	Name	Games	Sport	Event
Bronze	Chermen Valiev	2024 Paris	Wrestling	Men's freestyle 74 kg
Bronze	Islam Dudaev	2024 Paris	Wrestling	Men's freestyle 65 kg

== Flagbearers ==
Summer Olympics
Games	Athlete	Sport
1972 Munich	Afërdita Tusha	Shooting
1992 Barcelona	Kristo Robo	Shooting
1996 Atlanta	Mirela Maniani	Athletics
2000 Sydney	Ilirjan Suli	Weightlifting
2004 Athens	Klodiana Shala	Athletics
2008 Beijing	Sahit Prizreni	Freestyle wrestling
2012 London	Romela Begaj	Weightlifting
2016 Rio de Janeiro	Luiza Gega	Athletics
2020 Tokyo	Luiza Gega; Briken Calja	Athletics; Weightlifting
2024 Paris	Zelimkhan Abakarov; Kaltra Meça	Wrestling; Swimming

Winter Olympics
Games	Athlete	Sport
2006 Turin	Erjon Tola	Alpine skiing
2010 Vancouver	Erjon Tola	Alpine skiing
2014 Sochi	Erjon Tola	Alpine skiing
2018 Pyeongchang	Suela Mehilli	Alpine skiing
2022 Beijing	Denni Xhepa	Alpine skiing

== See also ==
- Sports in Albania
- Albania at the Mediterranean Games
- List of participating nations at the Summer Olympic Games
- List of participating nations at the Winter Olympic Games
- Category:Olympic competitors for Albania
- Albania at the Paralympics
