= List of flag bearers for Albania at the Olympics =

Albania at the Olympics
- IOC code: ALB
- NOC: Albanian National Olympic Committee
- Website: www.nocalbania.org.al (in Albanian)
- Medals: Gold 0 Silver 0 Bronze 2 Total 2

Summer appearances
- 1972; 1976–1988; 1992; 1996; 2000; 2004; 2008; 2012; 2016; 2020; 2024; 2028

Winter appearances
- 2006; 2010; 2014; 2018; 2022; 2026

This is a list of flag bearers who have represented Albania at the Olympics.

Flag bearers carry the national flag of their country at the opening ceremony of the Olympic Games.

== Summer Olympics ==
#	Event year	Flag bearer	Sport
1	1972	Afërdita Tusha	Shooting
2	1992	Kristo Robo	Shooting
3	1996	Mirela Maniani	Athletics
4	2000	Ilirjan Suli	Weightlifting
5	2004	Klodiana Shala	Athletics
6	2008	Sahit Prizreni	Freestyle wrestling
7	2012	Romela Begaj	Weightlifting
8	2016	Luiza Gega	Athletics
9	2020	Luiza Gega	Athletics
9	2020	Briken Calja	Weightlifting
10	2024	Zelimkhan Abakarov	Wrestling
10	2024	Kaltra Meca	Swimming

== Winter Olympics ==
#	Event year	Flag bearer	Sport
1	2006	Erjon Tola	Alpine skiing
2	2010	Erjon Tola	Alpine skiing
3	2014	Erjon Tola	Alpine skiing
4	2018	Suela Mehilli	Alpine skiing
5	2022	Denni Xhepa	Alpine skiing
6	2026	Lara Colturi	Alpine skiing
6	2026	Denni Xhepa	Alpine skiing

== See also ==
- Albania at the Olympics
