= Sport in Albania =

Sport in Albania revolves mostly around team sports, such as football, basketball, volleyball and handball. Other sports includes boxing, weightlifting, tennis, swimming, judo, karate, athletics, table tennis, badminton, rugby, cricket, and chess. Football in particular has seen a rapid transformation, with the Albania national football team making its debut at the 1964 UEFA European Football Championship. The national football team also qualified for the 2016 UEFA European Football Championship. Many Albanian athletes have also achieved significant success and have won European and Mediterranean titles in numerous sports during the years, such as wrestling, football, athletics and weightlifting. Albanian athletes have won a total 49 medals for Albania in 8 different Mediterranean sports.

== Football ==
Football is the most popular sport in Albania. It arrived in Albania at the beginning of the 20th century. Football is played by children at school and by grown-ups on the many indoor and outdoor fields located throughout the country. The sport is governed by the Football Association of Albania (Federata Shqiptare e Futbollit).

The first recorded match was between students at a Christian mission in Shkodër. Other towns and cities followed suit and on 6 June 1930 the Football Association of Albania was established. The association became a member of football's governing body FIFA in 1932, and joined the European governing body UEFA in 1954 as a founding member.

Albania was the winner of the 1946 Balkan Cup and the 2000 Malta International Tournament. At the UEFA Euro 1964 in Spain, Albania made its first-ever appearance at a major men's football tournament were they reached despite not qualifying the Round of 16. Albania's highest FIFA World Ranking for men was 22nd, in August 2015. Albania qualified for the UEFA Euro 2016 in France. Playing in the Groupstage in Group A against France, Switzerland and Romania.

The youth teams of Albania got a rich history in football as the Albania national under-21 football team won twice the Balkan Youth Championship in 1978 and 1981 and they also qualify once at the 1984 UEFA European Under-21 Championship, losing in the Quarterfinals against Italy.

One of the most successful Albanian Football Managers in the history of the Country is Shyqyri Rreli. His main success came for the Albania national under-21 football team, in which he led them to two straight titles of the Balkan Youth Championship (in 1978 and 1981) and to the quarter finals of the Euro 1984, where Albania's Under 21 side was among the best 8 European teams. He also led Tirana to the best 16 clubs in three European competitions 1986–87 European Cup Winners' Cup, 1988–89 European Cup, and 1989–90 European Cup. He also will be remembered for getting Albania close to qualifying in the Mexico 1986 campaign, most notably through a victory against Belgium and draws against Poland and Greece finishing third the best result for Albania in twenty years.

The Albania national under-17 football team is hosting the 2025 UEFA European Under-17 Championship. Playing in Group A against France, Germany and Portugal. Taking place for the second time in their history in the U17 category. Albania would lose all three matches during their campaign.

=== Pre war history of Albania ===
Founded on 6 June 1930, Albania had to wait 16 years to play its first international match, which was against Yugoslavia in 1946. In 1932, Albania had already joined FIFA (during the congress 12–16 June) and in 1954 it was one of the founding members of UEFA. Albania was invited to play in the 1938 World Cup, but did not take part due to logistical problems.

=== 1946: Champion of the Balkans ===
Loro Boriçi captained the team in winning the 1946 Balkan Cup.

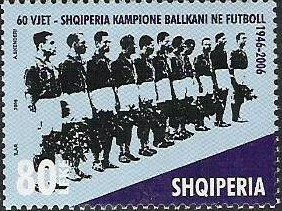
Stamps of Albania in 2006 depicting the squad that won the 1946 Balkan Cup

The early years oversaw a notably successful Balkan Cup in the 1946 campaign. Albania won the cup after overcoming Yugoslavia on level points but a better goal difference. The final match ended in a 1–0 win against Romania. Four days earlier, Albania had already beaten Bulgaria 3–1. Albania was not expected to participate, but the withdrawal of Greece from the tournament offered Albania a chance to join in the re-established post-war cup.

=== 1964: Among the best 16 teams of Europe ===
Albania waited until 1962 to compete in a Euro Cup competition and the only time Albania was between the best 16 teams of the Continent, the reason being Albania got past the first leg as Greece, for political reasons forfeited the game. Albania beat Denmark in the second leg in the round of 16 thanks to an early goal from Panajot Pano. Despite that win Albanian could not progress further as they lost the first leg with 4–0 away from home. At the end of the tournament Albania ranked 9th in Europe.

=== 1964-1972: Qualification for Tokyo and Munich at the Summer Olympics ===
Albania participated for the first time in football at the 1964 Summer Olympics in the men's qualification tournament. They faced Bulgaria in the preliminary round, losing both matches, in close games, in the process. They participated for the second and last time ever at the 1972 Summer Olympics in which they faced Romania at the Men's European Qualifiers in the playoffs. Albania lost both matches close with 2–1 away despite an equalizer of Medin Zhega in the first leg. They would lose once again with 1–2 in the second leg despite a leading goal from Panajot Pano. So far their last time participing for any Olympic Games in Football.

=== 1986: Near-qualification for the World Cup in Mexico ===
In the 1986 FIFA World Cup qualification Albania faced Belgium, Poland and their rivals Greece. Despite their first loss away from home against Belgium, 3–1, despite an equalizer from Bedri Omuri. Albania could draw against Poland away with 2-2 scoring their first point. After that, Albania famously beat Belgium, at home, 2–0 in the Qemal Stafa Stadium. The goals were scored by Mirel Josa and Arben Minga securing Albania their first and only win in this qualification. It was their most successful FIFA World Cup qualification, finishing third above Greece but behind Belgium and Poland in the process.

=== 2014–2016: Success at the European Championship ===
Albania qualified for UEFA Euro 2016, its first appearance at a major men's football tournament after 50 years. This earned the team the Honor of Nation Order from Albania's President Bujar Nishani. The national team of Albania was given awards of honor and city recognition by the cities of Tirana, Vlore, Kamëz, and Bajram Curri.

Albania started the qualifiers of the UEFA Euro 2016 with an emphatic 1–0 away win against Portugal, which was followed by a 1–1 draw against Denmark at the newly renovated stadium Elbasan Arena. Then they were awarded a 3–0 victory over Serbia in Belgrade. After beating Armenia 3–0 in the last qualifying match, Albania made history by qualifying for the UEFA Euro 2016, its first appearance at a major men's football tournament after 50 years and Albania's first-ever appearance at a competitive tournament in the history. In the tournament itself, Albania lost 0–1 to Switzerland and 0–2 to hosts France. While they beat Romania 1–0 (their first win against Romania since 1947), the team finished last among the third-placed teams and did not progress beyond the group stage.

=== 2021–2023: From an unlucky FIFA World Cup 2022 campaign to UEFA Euro 2024 qualification ===
After their close miss to qualify for the 2022 FIFA World Cup in Qatar, in which Albania finished third in the group, in the UEFA Euro 2024 qualifying Group E Albania were drawn together with Czech Republic, Poland, Faroe Islands and Moldova. In the following matches Albania was undefeated, and secured the qualification for the second time in history for the UEFA European Championship at the UEFA Euro 2024. Albania finished the qualifications in the first place with 15 points for the first time in their history. They secured the second pot for the UEFA group stage draws after ranking 10th in the power rankings.

=== UEFA Euros 2024 ===
On 17 November 2023, Albania qualified for UEFA Euro 2024, their second major tournament. They were drawn in Group B, which is considered the group of death by many fans, containing three-time Euro winners Spain, two-time Euro winners and defending champions Italy, as well as Croatia, which came third in the 2022 FIFA World Cup.

=== Kategoria Superiore ===
The Kategoria Superiore is the main division in Albania; their first season started in 1930. Apart from 1938 to 1944 it took place every season. The club with the most titles is KF Tirana who won this competition 25 times. The Albanian Football Cup was founded since 1938-39 in which KF Tirana being the most successful club in the country with 16 titles closely followed by Partizani Tirana who won this competition 15 times so far.

The Albanian league sides enjoyed success also in European football competitions. KF Skënderbeu Korçë qualify twice for the UEFA Europa League first in 2015-16 and for the second time in 2017-18, as they qualify as the first Albanian football club after four qualifying rounds to the groupstage. Partizani Tirana won the one and only international club title for Albania as they won the 1970 Balkans Cup against Beroe Stara Zagora in the finals.

KF Tirana qualified three times in the round of sixteen in the European Cup first in 1982-83 defeating Linfield in the first round. They achieved the same results in 1988-89 by defeating this time in the first round Ħamrun Spartans from Malta after two legs. They faced in the round of 16 the Swedish league side IFK Göteborg but lost both matches after two legs were played. In the following year in 1989-90 KF Tirana once more qualified for the best 16 of Europe as they defeated this time another Maltese side in Siliema Wanderers after two legs in the first round. Their highest win at this competition came in the second leg at home defeating the Wanderers with 5–0. They faced in the next round Bundesliga side FC Bayern Munich. They could not go through to the quarterfinals as they lost both legs.

In the UEFA Cup Flamutari Vlora is the most successful club for Albania. As they did compete for the first time in 1986-87 against FC Barcelona in the first round drawing both matches and nearly qualified for the next stage, at this competition. Losing out on the away rule. At the following season in 1987-88 they achieved their greatest result so far. They qualified for the first time at the round of sixteen, defeating surprisingly the Yugoslav side Partizan Belgrad with 2–0 at home and qualified for the second round after a 1–2 defeat in which Sokol Kushta scored a famous goal for his club side. In the following round Flamutari Vlora defeated then East German side Wismut Aue after two legs, winning at home with 2–0. They faced Barcelona for the second time in a row in which they lost the first leg in Camp Nou with 4-1 but beat the Spanish side in the following leg with 1–0 by a goal from Kushta, to secure the most famous win for Albania in a UEFA club competition.

=== Women's football ===
The women's national team was formed in 2011. The women's highest FIFA World Ranking was 40th in April 2015. The FIFA Women's World Cup 2015 was the first time Albania entered a senior competitive tournament.

The Albanian Women's National Championship started its first championship since 2009. Vllaznia Shkodër is the most successful club at this competition, as they won so far nine league titles, in which also nine times in a row, between 2013–14 and most recently in 2021-22. They also do compete in Europe, since their debut in the 2011–12 UEFA Women's Champions League.

Most recently Vllaznia were able to achieve great success in the UEFA Women's Champions League. As they qualified for the first time ever in the history as a football club to the knockout phase in the round of 32 in the 2019–20 UEFA Women's Champions League, in which they faced Fortuna Hjørring from Denmark. They lost both matches, at home with 0-1 and away with 2–0, despite being one of the greatest successes in the history of women's football in Albania. After some years they were able to replicate the success they had earlier. After beating in Round 2 FC Vorskla Poltava from Ukraine, they first played a draw, but won the following match with 2–1 to qualify, for the first time ever as a country to the group stage of the UEFA Women's Champions League, in this years edition.

== Achievements in Football ==
=== Albania National Football Team Achievements ===
- UEFA European Championship:
  - Round of 16 (1): 1964 European Nations' Cup qualification.
  - Groupstage (2): UEFA Euro 2016 in France UEFA Euro 2024 in Germany.
- Balkan Cup:
  - Champions (1): 1946
- Malta International Football Tournament:
  - Champions (1): 2000
- UEFA Nations League
  - Promotion (1): 2020–21 UEFA Nations League C

=== Achievements of Youth Football ===
- UEFA European Under-21 Championship
  - Quarterfinals (1): in 1984
- Balkan Youth Championship
  - Winners (2): 1978, 1981
- Football at the Mediterranean Games
  - 6th Place finish (1): at the 1991 Mediterranean Games for Albania (U23)
- UEFA European Under-19 Championship
  - Groupstage (1): by the Albania U19 in 1982
- WAFF U-19 Championship
  - Groupstage (1): in 2024
- UEFA European Under-17 Championship
  - Groupstage (2): by the Albania U17 in 1994 and also in the 2025 UEFA European Under-17 Championship.

=== Albanian football clubs in UEFA Club Competitions ===
- UEFA Champions League:
  - Round of 16 (3): KF Tirana in 1982, 1988, 1989 European Cup
- UEFA Europa League:
  - Round of 16 (1): Flamutari Vlora in 1987
  - Groupstage (2): KF Skënderbeu Korçë in 2015–16 and 2017–18
- UEFA Cup Winners' Cup:
  - Round of 16 (3): KF Besa Kavajë in 1972, KF Tirana in 1986 and KF Vllaznia Shkodër in the 1987 European Cup Winners' Cup
- Balkans Cup:
  - Winners (1): Partizani Tirana,
  - 1970 Balkans Cup

==== Albanian Female Football clubs in UEFA Competitions ====
- UEFA Women's Champions League
  - Round of 32 (1): by Vllaznia Shkodër in 2019–20 and they qualified to the Groupstage (1): by Vllaznia Shkodër in 2022–23

== Basketball ==
Event	1st	2nd	3rd
Olympic Games	0	0	0
FIBA Women's Basketball World Cup	0	0	0
EuroBasket	0	0	0
Mediterranean Games	1	0	0
Championship for Small Countries	1	2	0
Total	2	2	0

=== EuroBasket ===
Albania competed in two European championships at EuroBasket 1947 in Prague, Czechoslovakia, where they finished 14th and at EuroBasket 1957 in Sofia, Bulgaria, finishing in 16th place. Some years later they nearly qualified for the EuroBasket 1975 in Yugoslavia finishing third in the qualifying, winning matches against Luxembourg with 95–71 beating Iceland with a record win of 112-77 and Sweden with a score of 71-82 respectively. Missing out slightly for their "third" Eurobasket appearance in their history.

=== Mediterranean Games ===
Albania has participated twice at the Mediterranean Games in basketball. Their debut came in 1991. They also participated in the 2009 Mediterranean Games, where they finished 6th.

Mediterranean Games
Year	Position	Pld	W	L
(Greece) 1991	8th	5	0	5
(Italy) 2009	6th	6	1	5
Total		11	1	10

=== Olympic Games ===
The men's national basketball team tried twice to qualify at the Summer Olympics in basketball. As they participate in two Pre-Olympic Basketball Tournaments. First in the qualifying in 1972. They had three matches, losing all but had two close encounters one against Belgium with 83-82 and the other one being against the Netherlands with 84-81 missing so out to the Final Round.

Their following participation came in 1992 in the 1992 Pre-Olympic Basketball Tournament. They competed in Group A. The Albanians securing their first win at this competition against Switzerland 84–85 as it was their only win in their campaign. Albania had close losses against Italy 73-87 and Latvia with 78-94 despite that Albania failed to qualify for the playoffs stage, with a 5th-place finish.

=== Universiade ===
Despite not qualifying for the Summer Olympics. Albania were able to take place at the 1970 Summer Universiade in Torino, Italy. In which Albania finished 24th after being able to win matches against Luxembourg even twice with 84-67 and 90–60 as well as beating Sudan a record 116-74 and against Senegal with 83–71 to secure four wins in their campaign being Albania's most successful tournament in Basketball. Notable for Albania by almost upsetting one of the strongest national basketball teams Yugoslavia by losing only by two points difference with a result of 74-72 respectively. So far Albania's only participation at the Summer Universiade.

=== Albanian Basketball League ===
The Albanian Basketball League have a long history as their first division was held in 1946. BC Partizani Tirana is the most successful club in this league, as they won it 33 times in their history most recently in 1996. It is also the most successful Albanian team in Europe, competing in the past with success in the FIBA European Champions Cup and other major competitions.

The history of B.C. Partizani Tirana in the European competitions starts on 18 December 1968, when Italian champions Pallacanestro Cantù (then Oransoda Cantù) were seeking an "easy journey" in Albania when it had to meet B.C. Partizani Tirana in the Champion Club's Cup (in that time the highest European competition organized by FIBA). The match ended with the result 73–73. The playmaker of B.C. Partizani Tirana, Agim Fagu scored 48 points in this match, and for that was awarded with the "FIBA Banner Badge" by the Secretary-General of FIBA, William Jones, who was present at this match.

BC Partizani Tirana first competed for the Albanian Basketball Superleague in the 1969–70 FIBA European Champions Cup, but lost both their first-round games against CS Dinamo București. In the 1970–71 FIBA European Champions Cup, forfeited against İTÜ from Turkey in the first round due to a cholera outbreak at the time in Turkey

In the 1972–73 FIBA European Champions Cup BC Partizani Tirana faced Jeunesse Sportivo Alep from Syria, who withdrew yet again, allowing BC Partizani Tirana to progress to the round of 16 for the first time in their history. They then faced Crvena zvezda from Yugoslavia, losing both games. The 1973–74 FIBA European Champions Cup campaign saw even bigger success for BC Partizani Tirana, who faced Csepel SC in Hungary. Despite an unlucky 57–58 loss away, at home the Albanian side won a FIBA European Champions Cup match for the first time, 78–71, to progress yet again in the round of 16 for the third year running. There, Partizani Tirana faced Wienerberger from Austria. They proved for the first time to be competitive in such a high stage, winning with 72–71. In the second leg in Wien they missed their chance to qualify for the quarterfinals, losing 78–68.

In the 1974–75 FIBA European Champions Cup Partizani Tirana played Sparta Bertrange away in Luxembourg, and won comfortably with 103–89, for their first away win in a FIBA Cup competition. At home in Tirana they beat the opposition deservedly with 90–70, resulting in an impressive aggregate of 193–159 in the process. In the round of sixteen Partizani Tirana had to face Bulgarian side BC Balkan Botevgrad, but withdrew before the first leg and lost so the chance to qualify for the next round as well.

After some years where BC Partizani Tirana did not participate in the FIBA European Champions Cup, they returned in the 1978–79 FIBA European Champions Cup, competing for the first time in the quarterfinals. In Group E they faced KK Bosna Royal, BC Brno and AEL Limassol B.C. as their opponents. In the first match they had to face at home BC Brno, Partizani beating them comfortably with 100–79. In the next match they faced KK Bosna Royal away in Sarajevo. Partizani lost the match with 64–99. In the third match they faced AEL Limassol at home. They beat them easily with 151–58 at the process being its highest win in this competition. In the fourth Quarterfinal's group match Partizani Tirana faced BC Brno away. It was the most important match for Partizani in its Basketball club history. As they still had the chance to qualify for the semifinals. Partizani could not hold on to the result, as they did in the first half (41–46) as they lost the match in the end with 104–83 and also their "chances" to qualify for the semifinals.

In the following 1979–80 FIBA European Champions Cup season B.C. Partizani Tirana faced in the Quarterfinal Groupstage in group E KK Partizan Belgrade, Budapesti Honvéd SE and Al Ittihad Aleppo respectively. BC Partizani Tirana would show a strong display. Winning four matches alone three at Home. Defeating Budapesti Honvéd SE at home with 91-85 then KK Partizan Belgrade with 101-98 and Al Ittihad Aleppo at home with a result of 105–93. To finish second in this Group, missing out close on the semifinals at the end. Partizani was among the best twelve clubs of Europe.

=== Women's national basketball team ===
The Albania women's national basketball team is the most successful basketball team in Albania.

They participated in two international tournaments so far three times at the Mediterranean Games first in 1987 Syria. They won in their debut participation the tournament, after beating the women's from Turkey in the finals. To win their maiden gold medal in their debut participation. They would compete two more times most recently for the third time in 2009 Pescara. Where they finished in 6th place.

Year	Round	Position
(Syria) 1987	Finals Winner	1st
(Greece) 1991	Preliminary Round	5th
(Italy) 2009	Preliminary Round	6th

The Albanian female also competed regularly at the Championship for Small Countries. In which they won three medals. They first came runners-up in 1996 losing to Iceland with 81–73 respectively. Before winning just six years later against them with 84–79 to secure their second achievement in their history. In 2008 they once more won silver after losing to Malta in the finals.

== Volleyball ==
Albania has a long tradition in volleyball as it is the second-most successful club sport in Albania after football. Especially the Albanian female national team have a strong reputation in this sport. The women of Dinamo Tirana reached the final of the CEV Women's Champions League twice in their history, in 1979–80 and 1989–90, finishing both times in third place. They also qualified for the finals in the CEV Cup in 1986-87 where they did not take place in the finals, due to the regime at that time. It is the best sport achievement for Albania out of any club sports, they participated so far.

The Albania women's national volleyball team won at the 1987 Mediterranean Games in Syria, their biggest success ever. In their following participation at the Mediterranean Games in 1991 they finished their campaign in 4th place. In the same year the women's of Albania qualified for the Women's European Volleyball Championship in 1991 Italy where they finished 11th. It is their only time they participated at this competition.

The women of Albania also participated with success at the Balkan Female Volleyball Championship. Winning this tournament in 1990 in Bulgaria, two years before they finished runners-up in Tirana. They collected four medals overall.

The Albania national team participated in the 2018 Women's European Volleyball League, defeating Estonia in the third-place match, winning an unforeseen bronze medal.

=== Men's volleyball ===
As of January 2023, the Albania men's national volleyball team ranked 55th in the world, somewhat less successful than the women's team. They did compete in several tournaments, especially throughout the 1950s and 1960s.

They participated three times in their history at the Men's European Volleyball Championship with their first participation in the 1955 Men's European Volleyball Championship in Romania, in which the Albanians had their best result ever as they finished 10th on their debut. They would participate two more times in 1958 in Czechoslovakia, and their third and last appearance came at the 1967 Men's European Volleyball Championship in Turkey.

The Albanians also made history at the FIVB Volleyball Men's World Championship in which they qualified at the 1962 FIVB Volleyball Men's World Championship in the Soviet Union, in which they finished in the 16th place.

=== Albanian Club Volleyball history ===
The Volleyball Club Dynamo Tirana were able to reach its heights at the CEV Champions League in 1971–72, after eliminating Panathinaikos Athens after beating it after both legs. In the Semifinals Group Dinamo Tirana were able to win two matches, against CSKA Sofia 3-2 and Rebels Lier from Belgium with a 3-1 set were enough to go through to the finals. In which Tirana faced Volejbal Brno, AMVJ Amstelveen, Ruini Firenze. They would lose unfortunately all matches to finish 4th in the end. It is the best result so far for the Albanian men's at this competition.

=== Achievements by Albania in Volleyball ===
Event	1st	2nd	3rd
Olympic Games	0	0	0
FIVB Volleyball Women's World Championship	0	0	0
Mediterranean Games	1	0	0
Women's European Volleyball League Division Silver	0	0	1
CEV Women's Champions League	0	0	2
Total	1	0	3

== Athletics ==
Event	1st	2nd	3rd
Olympic Games	0	0	0
World Athletics Championships	0	0	0
European Games	1	0	0
European Athletics Championships	1	1	0
European Athletics Indoor Championships	1	0	0
Mediterranean Games	2	2	3
Universiade	0	1	0
European Youth Olympics	0	0	1
Total	5	4	4

Athletics has been a successful individual sport in Albania. Izmir Smajlaj won gold in the men's long jump in 2017 European Athletics Indoor Championships in Belgrade and Luiza Gega won silver at the 2013 Summer Universiade in the 1500 metres run, the first medal for Albania at the Summer Universiade. Gega also won silver in the women's 3000 metres steeplechase in the 2016 European Championships in Athletics in Amsterdam. She won the first-ever gold medal for Albania at the 2022 European Athletics Championships in Munich, winning the contest with a time of 9:11.31. It was also her first gold medal at the European Athletics Championships. Achieving also a European Athletics Championships record. In the 2023 European Games she would write history for Albania, as she won the gold medal in the 3000 metres steeplechase, equaling the record of the Bulgarian athlete Ivet Lalova-Collio with 11 wins in her athletic carrier. She also secured the qualification for the 2024 Olympic Games in Paris after winning yet another gold medal this time in the Balkan Athletics Championship in Serbia.

Gega also competed for Albania at the 2016 and 2020 Summer Olympics in the women's 3000 metres steeplechase. She was the flag bearer for Albania at the 2016 Olympics and together with Briken Calja in 2020. Gega qualified as the first Albanian to the finals in Athletics at the 2020 Summer Olympics.

Albania is also successful in athletics at the Mediterranean Games in which they won seven medals, two gold, two silvers and three bronze. Gega has been the most successful athlete for Albania at this competition, winning first silver in 2013 and gold in the 3000 metres steeplechase, followed by another gold in the 2022. She is the first Albanian athlete to achieve this feat at the Mediterranean Games.

== Boxing ==
Albania competed at the AIBA World Boxing Championships held in Belgrade in 2021. Alban Beqiri won the first-ever medal for Albania at this competition, winning bronze in the light middleweight category.

Florian Marku is a former kickboxer who competes in boxing. In 2014 he won the WKU World Championship in kickboxing, then won the IBF world title against Maxim Prodan.

At the 2018 Mediterranean Games held in Tarragona, Krenar Zeneli secured the silver medal in bantamweight, the first silver medal for Albania in boxing at the Mediterranean Games.

== Shooting ==
Shooting is a well-known sport in Albania.

The best-known shooter from Albania is Elizabeta Karabolli, who won three medals at the European Shooting Championships. She won her first medal (bronze) in 1977 in Rome, then silver in 1978, and gold in Frankfurt 1979 in the 25m pistol discipline. She was the first European champion in shooting for Albania.

Ermira Dingu won her first gold medal in the 50m rifle prone in 1980 in Madrid, the first medal in this category for her country. Lindita Kodra became the third European female shooting champion for Albania in 2007 in Granada, Spain. She also represented Albania at the 2008 Summer Olympics in Beijing.

Albania has won five medals at the European Shooting Championships with three of them being three gold, one silver and one bronze. At the Mediterranean Games Albania so far won one gold medal, four Silber and two bronze Medals, it is one of the most successful individual sports for the country at this competition.

== Gymnastics ==
Gymnastics has only a brief history in Albania. Matvei Petrov, born in Russia, has represented Albania since 2018 in the pommel horse event. In the 2020 FIG Artistic Gymnastics World Cup series he won bronze, the first medal for Albania at this sport. He also won the gold medal in the 2020 European Championships with a score of 14.566 in total. This is the first medal won for Albania at the European Men's Artistic Gymnastics Championships.

== Weightlifting ==
Weightlifting is one of the most successful individual sports for the Albanians, with the national team winning medals at the European Weightlifting Championships and other international competitions. Albanian weightlifters have won a total of 34 medals at the European Championships with 9 gold, 13 silver and 12 bronze. In the World Weightlifting Championships, the Albanian weightlifting team has won one gold medal in 1972, a silver in 2002 and a bronze in 2011. And most recently a Silber medal in the 2021 World Weightlifting Championships with Birken Calja. At the Mediterranean Games, the nation has won 5 gold, 11 silver and 10 bronze medals since their debut.

- Ymer Pampuri finished 9th at the 1972 Summer Olympic Games.
- Briken Calja finished 5th in the 2016 Summer Olympics. He also finished 4th at the 2020 Summer Olympics in Tokyo.
- Evagjelia Veli finished 8th at the 2016 Summer Olympics.

Albanian medalists at European championships
Medal	Name	Year	Event
Bronze	Agron Haxhihyseni	Reims 1987	Men's 52 kg
Bronze	Luan Shabani	Athens 1989	Men's 56 kg
Bronze	Artur Duraj	Aalborg 1990	Men's 60 kg
Bronze	Ilirian Suli	Sofia 2000	Men's 77 kg
Silver	Fetie Kasaj	Władysławowo 2006	Women's 58 kg
Silver	Romela Begaj	Lignano Sabbiadoro 2008	Women's 58 kg
Silver	Erkand Qerimaj	Bucharest 2009	Men's 77 kg
Bronze	Romela Begaj	Bucharest 2009	Women's 58 kg
Silver	Romela Begaj	Minsk 2010	Women's 58 kg
Bronze	Erkand Qerimaj	Minsk 2010	Men's 77 kg
Bronze	Daniel Godelli	Kazan 2011	Men's 69 kg
Silver	Romela Begaj	Antalya 2012	Women's 58 kg
Silver	Daniel Godelli	Tirana 2013	Men's 69 kg
Bronze	Romela Begaj	Tirana 2013	Women's 58 kg
Gold	Erkand Qerimaj	Tel Aviv 2014	Men's 77 kg
Silver	Daniel Godelli	Tel Aviv 2014	Men's 77 kg
Bronze	Erkand Qerimaj	Split 2017	Men's 77 kg
Gold	Briken Calja	Bukarest 2018	Men's 69 kg
Silver	Briken Calja	Batumi 2019	Men's 73 kg
Bronze	Briken Calja	Moscow 2021	Men's 73 kg
Gold	Evagjelia Veli	Tirana 2022	Women's 55 kg
Silver	Kristi Ramadani	Sofia 2024	Men's 81 kg

Albanian medalists at world championships
Medal	Name	Year	Event
Bronze	Romela Begaj	Anaheim 2017	Women's 69 kg
Silver	Briken Calja	Tashkent 2021	Men's 73 kg

=== Albanian Achievements in Weightlifting ===
Event	1st	2nd	3rd
Olympic Games	0	0	0
World Weightlifting Championships	0	1	0
European Weightlifting Championships	9	13	12
Weightlifting at the Mediterranean Games	5	11	10
Total	14	25	22

== Wrestling ==
Wrestling has wide participation in Albania. The country made its debut in wrestling at the 2004 Summer Olympics in Athens, participating regularly since then in the Olympics and other competitions. Albania won so far five medals at the Mediterranean Games in wrestling with one of them gold, one silver and three times bronze, since their debut.

Zelimkhan Abakarov is a Russian-born Albanian wrestler of Chechen origin. He is the best-known wrestler in Albania, and won the gold medal, in the Mediterranean Games, the first ever gold medal for Albania in wrestling. At the 2022 World Wrestling Championships in Belgrade he wrote history, as he became the first Albanian to win the gold medal in the men's freestyle 57 kg division. The next year he secured Albania's first medal at the Islamic Solidarity Games, as he won silver in the freestyle 65 kg division. In the following year Zelimkhan Abakarov would win his second medal with bronze this time at the 2023 World Wrestling Championships in Belgrade in the Men's freestyle 57 kg category. He also led Albania to another success as he won silber at the 2023 European Wrestling Championships held in Zagreb. Abakarov secured another silver medal at the following European Wrestling Championships held in Romania.

Sahit Prizreni is a well-known wrestler from Albania. He is a bronze medalist from 2007 in Baku. Being the first ever Medalist for Albania at the World Wrestling Championships. He competed for the second time for Albania in the Summer Olympics in 2008 in Beijing. Prizreni advanced to the round of 16 in the men's freestyle 60 kg category where he lost to Bazar Bazarguruev from Kyrgyzstan. After that he won the silver medal at the 2011 European Wrestling Championships in Dortmund.

Medalists for Albania at the World Wrestling Championships
Medal	Name	Year	Event
Bronze	Sahit Prizreni	Baku 2007	Men's freestyle 60 kg
Gold	Zelimkhan Abakarov	Belgrade 2022	Men's freestyle 57 kg
Bronze	Zelimkhan Abakarov	Belgrade 2023	Men's freestyle 57 kg

Medalists for Albania at the European Wrestling Championships
Medal	Name	Year	Event
Bronze	Elis Guri	Tampere 2008	Men's Greco-Roman 96 kg
Silver	Sahit Prizreni	Dortmund 2011	Men's freestyle 60 kg
Bronze	Islam Dudaev	Budapest 2022	Men's freestyle 65 kg
Silver	Zelimkhan Abakarov	Zagreb 2023	Men's freestyle 61 kg
Gold	Islam Dudaev	Bukarest 2024	Men's freestyle 65 kg
Silver	Zelimkhan Abakarov	Bukarest 2024	Men's freestyle 61 kg
Bronze	Zelimkhan Abakarov	Bratislava 2025	Men's freestyle 61 kg
Gold	Chermen Valiev	Bratislava 2025	Men's freestyle 74 kg

=== Medalists for Albania in wrestling at the Olympic Games ===
Medal	Name	Games	Sport	Event
Bronze	Chermen Valiev	2024 Paris	Wrestling	Men's freestyle 74 kg
Bronze	Islam Dudaev	2024 Paris	Wrestling	Men's freestyle 65 kg

=== Albania's Achievements in Wrestling ===
Event	1st	2nd	3rd
Olympic Games	0	0	2
World Wrestling Championships	1	0	2
European Wrestling Championships	2	3	3
Total	3	3	7

== Winter Sports ==
Winter Sports is a sport widely represented in recent times. Erjon Tola became the first athlete to represent Albania at the Winter Olympic Games in the 2006 Winter Olympics in Turin. His best finishing was the 35th place in the Men's giant slalom.

Lara Colturi is an Italian-born Albanian World Cup alpine ski racer who specializes in the technical events of slalom and giant slalom. She won the 2022 FIS Alpine Ski South American Cup.

== Summer Olympics ==
Albania made his debut at the Olympic Games at the 1972 Summer Olympics in Munich. Four men and one female represented the country, in two different sports. The weightlifter Ymer Pampuri achieved a great feat as he is the first and only Albanian to break an Olympic record, in military press, after lifting 127,5 kg respectively. After 20 years without participating, due to the regime boycotting the next four Olympic Games. Albania is participating since 1992 regularly at the Olympic games. They made their Winter Olympic Games debut in 2006 in Turin.

Briken Calja finished 5th in Weightlifting at the 2016 Summer Olympics in the 69 kg division. In the following olympics he came closer as he finished 4th at the 2020 Olympics in Tokyo. Missing the bronze medal by one kg after lifting 341 kg. Luiza Gega qualified for the finals in Athletics after finishing 5th in the semifinals, with a time of 9:23.85 being the first Albanian athlete to do so. In her final run she would finish in 13th place.

Albania won two medals in wrestling at the 2024 Summer Olympics. Their first ever Olympic medals came when Russian born Chermen Valiev and Islam Dudaev won bronze in their categories respectively.

=== Medalists for Albania at the Olympic Games ===
Medal	Name	Games	Sport	Event
Bronze	Chermen Valiev	2024 Paris	Wrestling	Men's freestyle 74 kg
Bronze	Islam Dudaev	2024 Paris	Wrestling	Men's freestyle 65 kg

== Mediterranean Games ==
Albania made his debut at the Mediterranean Games in 1987 Latakia, Syria. It would be their most successful games as the women of Albania would win gold in Basketball and Volleyball. Kristi Robo would win one gold medal in Shooting. Albania won in total eight medals in their campaign. To finish the 1987 Mediterranean Games in an 11th-place finish.

Their most successful sport is Weightlifting in which Albania won 26 medals in which of them being 5 gold medals, 11 silver and 10 bronze medals. Followed by sports such as Shooting 7 medals and Athletics with seven medals with two being gold. Albania won so far 49 medals in which of them being 11 Gold, 19 Silver and 19 Bronze medals, since their debut. They won medals in eight different sport competitions. Ranking 17th in the all-time medal table.

Their highest ranking per Sports is 7th in Volleyball 8th in Basketball and 9th in Weightlifting, being the only three sports who Albania is ranking in the top ten so far.

=== Medals won by Albania ===
Sport	Gold	Silver	Bronze	Total
Weightlifting	5	11	10	26
Athletics	2	2	3	7
Shooting	1	4	2	7
Wrestling	1	1	3	5
Volleyball	1	0	0	1
Basketball	1	0	0	1
Boxing	0	1	1	2
Total	11	19	19	49

== Medal winners in the Olympics, European Games and Mediterranean Games ==
Medals won by Albania at the Olympic Games
Olympic Games	Medals		
Olympic Games	Gold	Silver	Bronze
(France) 2024 Paris	0	0	2
Total	0	0	2

Medals won by Albania at the European Games
European Games	Medals		
European Games	Gold	Silver	Bronze
(Poland) 2023 Kraków and Małopolska	2	0	0
Total	2	0	0

Medals won by Albania at the Mediterranean Games
Mediterranean Games	Medals		
Mediterranean Games	Gold	Silver	Bronze
(Syria) 1987 Larnarka	3	1	4
(Greece) 1991 Athens	0	4	4
(France) 1993 Languedoc-Roussillon	0	2	0
(Italy) 1997 Bari	0	1	1
(Tunisia) 2001 Tunis	0	1	0
(Spain) 2005 Almería	0	1	0
(Italy) 2009 Pescara	2	4	0
(Turkey) 2013 Mersin	3	2	5
(Spain) 2018 Taragona	1	1	0
(Algeria) 2022 Oran	2	1	1
Total	11	19	19

Medals won by Albania at the Universiade
FISU World University Games	Medals		
FISU World University Games	Gold	Silver	Bronze
(Russia) 2013 Kazan	0	1	0
Total	0	1	0

=== Medal won by competition ===
Games	Gold	Silver	Bronze	Total
Olympic Games	0	0	2	2
European Games	2	0	0	2
Mediterranean Games	11	19	19	49
FISU World University Games	0	1	0	1
European Youth Olympic Festival	0	0	1	1
Total	13	20	22	55

=== Medals by sport ===
Sport	Gold	Silver	Bronze	Total
Weightlifting	5	11	10	26
Athletics	3	3	4	10
Shooting	1	4	2	7
Wrestling	1	1	5	7
Volleyball	1	0	0	1
Basketball	1	0	0	1
Karate	1	0	0	1
Boxing	0	1	1	2
Total	13	20	22	55

== National sports teams ==
=== Football ===
- Albania national football team
- Albania national under-21 football team
- Albania national under-20 football team
- Albania national under-19 football team
- Albania national under-18 football team
- Albania national under-17 football team
- Albania national under-16 football team
- Albania national under-15 football team
- Albania women's national football team
- Albania women's national under-19 football team
- Albania national futsal team

=== Basketball ===
- Albania national basketball team
- Albania national under-20 basketball team
- Albania women's national basketball team

=== Volleyball ===
- Albania women's national volleyball team
- Albania men's national volleyball team

=== Tennis ===
- Albania Davis Cup team

Badminton

- Albanian national badminton team

== See also ==
=== Sporting venues ===
- List of football stadiums in Albania
- Category:Sports venues in Albania

=== National leagues ===
- Albanian Superliga – football
- Albanian Basketball Superliga – basketball

=== Sports events ===
- Albania at the Olympics
- Albania at the Mediterranean Games
- Albania at the European Games
