= List of Albanian weightlifters =

This is a list of Albanian weightlifters.

== Male weightlifters ==
- Ferid Berberi (born 1946)
- Briken Calja (born 1990)
- Daniel Godelli (born 1992)
- Agron Haxhihyseni (born 1971)
- Endri Karina (born 1989)
- Leonidas Kokas (born 1973)
- Viktor Mitrou (born 1973)
- Ymer Pampuri (1944–2017)
- Hysen Pulaku (born 1992)
- Erkand Qerimaj (born 1988)
- Leonidas Sabanis (born 1971)
- Ilirian Suli (born 1975)
- Gert Trasha (born 1988)
- Theoharis Trasha (born 1985)
- Sokol Bishanaku (born 1971)
- Fatmir Bushi (born 1963)
- Dede Dekaj (born 1970)

== Female weightlifters ==
- Romela Begaj (born 1986)
- Evagjelia Veli (born 1991)
