= Albanian Weightlifting Federation =

Sports governing body in Albania

- Federata Shqiptare e Peshëngritjes
- Sport: Weightlifting
- Jurisdiction: Albania
- Abbreviation: FSHP
- Founded: 1949; 76 years ago
- Affiliation: IWF
- Regional affiliation: EWF
- Affiliation date: 1949
- Headquarters: Tirana
- President: Elez Gjoza
- Secretary: Kiara Nikolli

Official website
- www.fshp.org.al

The Albanian Weightlifting Federation (FSHP) (Albanian: Federata Shqiptare e Peshëngritjes) is a permanent, non-profit organization and the only authority responsible for organizing weightlifting competitions in Albania.

Founded in 1949, it is among the oldest national sports federations in the country.

FSHP is a member of the Albanian National Olympic Committee (KOKSH), the European Weightlifting Federation (EWF) and the International Weightlifting Federation (IWF). Since 1972, Albanian weightlifting has continuously achieved success, earning numerous international medals.

== Medals ==
European Weightlifting Championships

Albania at European Weightlifting Championships
European Weightlifting Championships (Women and Men)	Medals		
European Weightlifting Championships (Women and Men)	Gold	Silver	Bronze
(France) 1987 Reims	0	0	1
(Greece) 1989 Athens	0	0	1
(Denmark) 1990 Ålborg	0	0	1
(Bulgaria) 2000 Sofia	0	0	1
(Poland) 2006 Władysławowo	0	1	0
(Italy) 2008 Lignano Sabbiadoro	0	1	0
(Romania) 2009 Bucharest	0	1	1
(Belarus) 2010 Minsk	0	1	0
(Russia) 2011 Kazan	0	0	1
(Turkey) 2012 Antalya	0	1	0
(Albania) 2013 Tirana	0	1	1
(Israel) 2014 Tel Aviv	1	1	0
(Croatia) 2017 Split	1	1	2
TOTAL:	2	8	9

World Weightlifting Championships

Albania at World Weightlifting Championships
World Weightlifting Championships (Women and Men)	Medals		
World Weightlifting Championships (Women and Men)	Gold	Silver	Bronze
(Germany) 1972 Munich	1	0	0
(Poland) 2002 Warsaw	0	1	0
(France) 2011 Paris	0	0	1
TOTAL:	1	1	1

Weightlifting at the Mediterranean Games

Albania at the Mediterranean Games
Mediterranean Games (Women and Men)	Medals		
Mediterranean Games (Women and Men)	Gold	Silver	Bronze
Mediterranean Games	5	9	10
TOTAL:	5	9	10

== Notable weightlifters ==
=== Men ===
- Ymer Pampuri
- Faruk Kalleshi
- Aleksandër Kondo
- Pirro Dhima
- Sokol Bishanaku
- Agron Haxhihyseni
- Luan Shabani
- Viktor Mitro
- Ilirjan Suli
- Briken Calja
- Erkand Qerimaj
- Gert Trasha
- Mirjan Hakani
- Daniel Godelli
- Ertjan Kofsha

=== Women ===
- Fetie Kasaj
- Romela Begaj
- Evagjelia Veli
- Enkileda Carja

== See also ==
- Sports in Albania
- Albanian records in Olympic weightlifting
- Albania at the Mediterranean Games
