= Ferid Berberi =

Albanian weightlifter

Ferid Berberi (born December 6, 1946, in Tirana, Albania) (died December 14, 2021, in Tirana, Albania) was an Albanian teacher, sportsman and trainer. He died in his home on December 14, 2021, due to cardiac arrest. In 2021 he received the highest national honour with the award "Knight of the Order of the Flag" (Kalorës i Urdhrit të Flamurit), from the President of the Republic. In 2019 he was given the "Olympic Order" from the Albanian National Olympic Committee, in 1996 the award "Honor of Albanian Sports" and in 1994 the award "Merited Master of Sports". In 1971 he was awarded the Order and Medal "Naim Frashëri" for his efforts in education and sport.

== Early life ==
Ferid Berberi was born in central Tirana on December 6, 1946, when the entire Tirana district had a population of about 83,000 people, spread out with no public automobiles. He was the second of four siblings in the entrepreneurial family of Rexhep Berberi, and grew up in the transition to the People's Socialist Republic of Albania after World War II. He lived in a wooden house in Tirana, as his father had learned in Istanbul that wood is more flexible than concrete during an earthquake. Fruit trees and herbs were grown abundantly in the rural/urban setting that is now concrete Tirana and their water was sourced from their own well. In his youth he enjoyed playing soccer, sciences and math, the arts, work and helping others.

== Athlete ==
With training from Riza Lofca, he set 37 National weightlifting records as an athlete, won the gold medal at the II National Spartakiad in 1969 and was a National Champion in 1972,73,74 and 75. He was the first Albanian to lift over 400 kg in three styles. Through sport, he was among the few Albanians allowed to go abroad during the country's communist period, including to China in 1972 and Romania in 1975. Throughout his athletic career, Berberi continued his studies and earned several diplomas, while also teaching at the high school level. He believed that all athletes should also receive a quality education.

== Trainer ==
He was trainer of the weightlifting team KS "Dinamo" from 1976-1979 and of the Albania national team from 1979-1985 as well as the National Youth Team of Albania from 1988-1991, winning championships as a coach with Dinamo in 1977, 1978, 1980, 1981, 1982, 1985, and with the national youth team winning twice Balkan champion in Greece and Turkey. Notable students he helped develop include Pirro Dhima (Pyrros Dimas), Aleksander Kondo, Luan Shabani (Leonidas Sabanis), Agron Haxhihyseni, Xhemal Qarri, Ardian Kokonozi and Sokol Bishanaku. He also coached Ymer Pampuri on the National Team. His students won 3 bronze medals at the European Championships, 2 gold medals at the Balkan Championships, 2 gold medals at the Youth Balkan Championships, and a silver medal at the Final of the European Cup in Antalya, Turkey.

Among his training methods were the importance of healthy diet and nutrition as well as emphasizing proper techniques, principles and discipline, stating "results are not achieved immediately. A good coach needs to have patience and composure to prepare them." Berberi believed that proper coaching requires patience, knowledge, perseverance for self-preparation and for the athlete, which includes good diet and moderation. He stood firmly against doping and corruption in sport and is remembered as an iconic figure in his country for bringing Albanian weightlifting up to international standards. He was the trainer of Dinamo Weightlifting Club, and had been a researcher at the Albanian Weightlifting Federation's research department. In 1995 he presented at a seminar for the World Weightlifting Federation and in 1996 at a seminar of the European Weightlifting Federation in Sofia, Bulgaria.

Ferid Berberi attended the 1996 Olympic Games in Atlanta and the 2000 Olympic Games in Sydney as Secretary General of the Albanian Weightlifting Federation, and continued to attend events such as the 2003 World Weightlifting Championships in Vancouver, Canada. Throughout his life he remained close to other high calibre current and former athletes, many of the latter who were involved in their respective federations, including the Albanian Football Association, Albanian Basketball Federation, Albanian Volleyball Federation, Albanian Gymnastics Federation, etc. He also regularly attended games and events. He spoke openly and often about his views relating to integrity in sport and was strongly against corruption and doping, advocating for the athlete.

== Teacher ==
Known as "Persor" or Professor, he was a teacher at Sami Frasheri High School in Tirana from 1969 to 1987, Professor at the Tirana University of Sports from 2009-2011, lecturer at the university "Aleksandër Xhuvani" in Elbasan and "Marin Barleti" in Tirana, and researcher at the sports research center in Tirana from 2001 to 2008. He was decorated with the Order and Medal "Naim Frashëri" (Urdhri dhe Medalja "Naim Frashëri") class I and class II for his work and achievements in the field of education and for the education of the younger generation.

As a teacher, he also impacted students outside of athletics and academics in matters of moral and philosophical thought, as well as personal care and integrity.

He wrote several publications on sports, anatomy, psychology, training methods, youth in sports, and other perspectives. Through his methodology he approached sport as a science. He earned diplomas in mechanics from the Polytechnic School "November 7" in 1968, mechanical engineering from "University of Tirana" in 1972 and teaching from "the Academy of Athletic Physical Education" in 1977.

== Other ==
While retaining close ties to former athletes and students, as a businessman, Berberi operated the Bar/Cafe Dea in the centre of Tirana for many years, and is remembered for giving free coffee to Muslims on Bajram/(Eid al fitr), to Christians on Easter, and regularly to customers, friends and neighbors. As a philanthropist he quietly supported various arts and culture initiatives and projects, and was generous in supporting people in need, his family, neighbors and friends. He visited countries on five continents through sports, education, family and tourism. He lived in the same neighbourhood of Tirana his entire life and was well known in numerous communities and throughout Albania and the diaspora.

He enjoyed time at the beach, and travelled the country extensively in all seasons to find high quality organic products, among his favourite being persimmon, honey and mountain tea (sideritis) for his family, friends and neighbours, as well as high quality spring water direct from mountain sources. He was consistently an early supporter rural Albanian economic development through sourcing of high quality rural and organic products to family and friends living in urban areas.

== Family ==
He had two children and was heavily involved in raising 5 grandchildren. Whenever possible he also helped his siblings, neighbors and friends as well as former students and acquaintances.

== Sources ==
- Feridi, "profesori" i shtangës : Ferid Berberi, by Sotir Seferaj, 2002
- Ferid Berberi, sportisti dhe trajneri erudit i shtangës, by Irfan Rama, 2007
