= List of Albanian records in Olympic weightlifting =

The following are the national records in Olympic weightlifting in Albania. Records are maintained in each weight class for the snatch lift, clean and jerk lift, and the total for both lifts by the Albanian Weightlifting Federation.

== Current records ==
=== Men ===
Event	Record	Athlete	Date	Meet	Place	Ref
60 kg
Snatch						
Clean & Jerk						
Total						
65 kg
Snatch						
Clean & Jerk						
Total						
71 kg
Snatch						
Clean & Jerk						
Total						
79 kg
Snatch						
Clean & Jerk						
Total						
88 kg
Snatch						
Clean & Jerk						
Total						
94 kg
Snatch	161 kg	Ertjan Kofsha	11 November 2025	Islamic Solidarity Games	Riyadh, Saudi Arabia	
Clean & Jerk	190 kg	Ertjan Kofsha	11 November 2025	Islamic Solidarity Games	Riyadh, Saudi Arabia	
Total	351 kg	Ertjan Kofsha	11 November 2025	Islamic Solidarity Games	Riyadh, Saudi Arabia	
110 kg
Snatch						
Clean & Jerk						
Total						
+110 kg
Snatch						
Clean & Jerk						
Total						

=== Women ===
Event	Record	Athlete	Date	Meet	Place	Ref
48 kg
Snatch						
Clean & Jerk						
Total						
53 kg
Snatch						
Clean & Jerk						
Total						
58 kg
Snatch						
Clean & Jerk						
Total						
63 kg
Snatch	98 kg	Enkileda Carja	31 October 2025	European Junior Championships	Durrës, Albania	
Clean & Jerk	118 kg	Enkileda Carja	31 October 2025	European Junior Championships	Durrës, Albania	
Total	216 kg	Enkileda Carja	31 October 2025	European Junior Championships	Durrës, Albania	
69 kg
Snatch	103 kg	Enkileda Carja	22 April 2026	European Championships	Batumi, Georgia	
Clean & Jerk	125 kg	Enkileda Carja	5 May 2026	World Junior Championships	Ismailia, Egypt	
Total	229 kg	Enkileda Carja	5 May 2026	World Junior Championships	Ismailia, Egypt	
77 kg
Snatch						
Clean & Jerk						
Total						
86 kg
Snatch						
Clean & Jerk						
Total						
+86 kg
Snatch						
Clean & Jerk						
Total						

== Historical records ==
=== Men (2018–2025) ===
Event	Record	Athlete	Date	Meet	Place	Ref
55 kg
Snatch						
Clean and Jerk						
Total						
61 kg
Snatch						
Clean & Jerk						
Total						
67 kg
Snatch						
Clean & Jerk						
Total						
73 kg
Snatch	156 kg	Briken Calja	10 December 2021	World Championships	Tashkent, Uzbekistan	
Clean and Jerk	190 kg	Briken Calja	28 July 2021	Olympic Games	Tokyo, Japan	
Total	342 kg	Briken Calja	10 December 2021	World Championships	Tashkent, Uzbekistan	
81 kg
Snatch	157 kg	Erkand Qerimaj	22 December 2019	Qatar Cup	Doha, Qatar	
Clean and Jerk	194 kg	Erkand Qerimaj	22 December 2019	Qatar Cup	Doha, Qatar	
Total	351 kg	Erkand Qerimaj	22 December 2019	Qatar Cup	Doha, Qatar	
89 kg
Snatch	157 kg	Krenar Shoraj	13 December 2021	World Championships	Tashkent, Uzbekistan	
Clean and Jerk	192 kg	Krenar Shoraj	8 April 2021	European Championships	Moscow, Russia	
Total	348 kg	Krenar Shoraj	8 April 2021	European Championships	Moscow, Russia	
96 kg
Snatch	151 kg	Krenar Shoraj	22 December 2019	Qatar Cup	Doha, Qatar	
Clean and Jerk	183 kg	Krenar Shoraj	22 December 2019	Qatar Cup	Doha, Qatar	
Total	334 kg	Krenar Shoraj	22 December 2019	Qatar Cup	Doha, Qatar	
102 kg
Snatch						
Clean and Jerk						
Total						
109 kg
Snatch						
Clean and Jerk						
Total						
+109 kg
Snatch						
Clean and Jerk						
Total						

=== Women (2018–2025) ===
Event	Record	Athlete	Date	Meet	Place	Ref
45 kg
Snatch						
Clean and Jerk						
Total						
49 kg
Snatch						
Clean and Jerk						
Total						
55 kg
Snatch	89 kg	Evagjelia Veli	9 December 2021	World Championships	Tashkent, Uzbekistan	
Clean and Jerk						
Total						
59 kg
Snatch	87 kg	Enkileda Carja	28 March 2023	Youth World Championships	Durrës, Albania	
Clean & Jerk						
Total						
64 kg
Snatch						
Clean and Jerk						
Total						
71 kg
Snatch						
Clean and Jerk						
Total						
76 kg
Snatch						
Clean and Jerk						
Total						
81 kg
Snatch						
Clean and Jerk						
Total						
87 kg
Snatch						
Clean and Jerk						
Total						
+87 kg
Snatch						
Clean and Jerk						
Total						
