= Albania at the 2018 Winter Olympics =

- Flag of Albania
- IOC code: ALB
- NOC: Albanian National Olympic Committee
- Website: nocalbania.org.al (in Albanian)

in Pyeongchang, South Korea 9–25 February 2018
- Competitors: 2 (1 man and 1 woman) in 1 sport
- Flag bearer: Suela Mëhilli
- Medals: Gold 0 Silver 0 Bronze 0 Total 0

Winter Olympics appearances (overview)
- 2006; 2010; 2014; 2018; 2022; 2026

Albania competed at the 2018 Winter Olympics in Pyeongchang, South Korea, which were held from 9 to 25 February 2018. The country's participation in Pyeongchang marked its fourth appearance at the Winter Olympics since its debut in 2006. The athlete delegation of the country was composed of two people: Erjon Tola and Suela Mëhilli in alpine skiing. The nation had aimed for a delegation of three or four athletes.

Mëhilli first competed in the women's giant slalom though placed 53rd, and then did not finish in the Women's slalom. Two days later, Tola competed in the men's giant slalom and placed 47th. He then placed 36th in the men's slalom. Thus, Albania has yet to win a Winter Olympic medal.

== Background ==
The 2018 Winter Olympics were held in Pyeongchang, South Korea, from 9 to 25 February 2018. This edition marked the nation's fourth appearance at the Winter Olympics since its debut at the 2006 Winter Olympics in Turin, Italy. The nation had never won a medal at the Winter Olympics, with its best performance coming from alpine skier Erjon Tola placing 35th in the men's giant slalom at the 2006 Winter Games.

=== Delegation and ceremonies ===
Before the games, three athletes, namely Tola, Suela Mëhilli and Marsel Biçoku received Olympic scholarships for the preparations for the 2018 Winter Games. The Albanian National Olympic Committee aimed for the delegation to include either three or four athletes for the Winter Games, citing it would be their biggest Winter Olympic delegation. Tola had competed for the nation since the nation's debut while Mëhilli had competed at the last games. The final delegation was composed of two athletes, Tola and Mëhilli and their coach Marko Teroni. They trained in Italy as the nation does not have proper training skiing facilities.

The Albanian delegation came in 48th out of the 91 National Olympic Committees in the 2018 Winter Olympics Parade of Nations within the opening ceremony. Mëhilli solely held the flag for the delegation in the parade. At the closing ceremony, she held the flag again.

== Competitors ==
List of Albanian competitors at the 2018 Winter Olympics
Sport	Men	Women	Total
Alpine skiing	1	1	2
Total	1	1	2

== Alpine skiing ==
Albania qualified two alpine skiers, one male and one female.

The alpine skiing events were held at the Yongpyong Alpine Centre. Mëhilli competed first for the nation, competing in the women's giant slalom on 15 February. Her first run recorded a time of 1:24.67 while her second was at 1:21.90. With a combined time of 2:46.57 she placed 53rd in the event, while the winner was Mikaela Shiffrin of the United States with a combined time of 2:20.02. She then competed in the women's slalom the following day though did not finish her first run and thus did not have a second run. The winner of the event was Frida Hansdotter of Sweden in a time of 1:38.63.

Two days later, Tola competed in the men's giant slalom. His first run recorded a time of 1:16.86 while his second run was in a time of 1:16.77. With a combined time of 2:33.63 she placed 47th in the event, while Marcel Hirscher of Austria won the event with a combined time of 2:18.04. He then competed in the men's slalom on 22 February, recording a time of 58.00 seconds for his first run and 59.06 seconds for his second run. With a combined time of 1:57.06 he placed 36th while André Myhrer of Sweden won with a combined time of 1:38.99.

Alpine skiing summary
Athlete	Event	Run 1		Run 2		Total	
Athlete	Event	Time	Rank	Time	Rank	Time	Rank
Erjon Tola	Men's giant slalom	1:16.86	54	1:16.77	49	2:33.63	47
Erjon Tola	Men's slalom	58.00	45	59.06	35	1:57.06	36
Suela Mëhilli	Women's giant slalom	1:24.67	60	1:21.90	54	2:46.57	53
Suela Mëhilli	Women's slalom	DNF					

== See also ==
- Albania at the 2018 Summer Youth Olympics
