= Klodiana Shala =

Albanian sprinter (born 1979)

Personal information
- Nationality: Albanian
- Born: 22 August 1979 (age 46) Tirana, PSR Albania
- Education: Athletics teaching
- Years active: 1997–2012
- Height: 1.68 m (5 ft 6 in)
Medal record
Women's athletics
Representing Albania
Mediterranean Games
Bronze medal – third place	2005 Almería	400m

Klodiana Shala (born 22 August 1979 in Tirana) is an Albanian track and field athlete who competes in the 200 metres and 400 metres sprints. Her personal bests are 23.27 and 52.86 seconds, respectively.

Klodiana Shala was the first athlete to qualify Albania for the final of a European athletics championship, in Gothenburg 2006.

She is a four-time Olympic participant having represented Albania at the Olympics in 2000, 2004 (where she was also the flagbearer), 2008 and 2012.

Since November 2002, she has held a scholarship from the Olympic Solidarity program.

She was the 400 metres bronze medalist at the 2005 Mediterranean Games.

In recognition of her career and contributions to sports, Klodiana Shala was awarded the title of Grand Master (Mjeshtër i Madh) by the Albanian President in 2016.

On 19 February 2020, the International Olympic Committee announced that the sample taken from Shala at the 2012 Olympic Games contained the banned doping substance of stanozolol.

Shala is the national record holder in the 60m, 100m, 200m, 400m, and 400m steeplechase events.

== Competition record ==
Year	Competition	Venue	Position	Event	Notes
Representing Albania
1995	European Junior Championships	Nyíregyháza, Hungary	14th (sf)	400 m	57.90
1995	European Junior Championships	Nyíregyháza, Hungary	15th (h)	400 m hurdles	62.65
1997	Mediterranean Games	Bari, Italy	8th	400 m hurdles	62.46
2000	Olympic Games	Sydney, Australia	52nd (h)	400 m	56.41
2001	World Championships	Edmonton, Canada	–	400 m	DQ
2001	Mediterranean Games	Radès, Tunisia	9th (h)	200 m	24.83
2001	Mediterranean Games	Radès, Tunisia	8th (h)	400 m	56.43
2002	European Championships	Munich, Germany	24th (h)	200 m	24.93
2002	European Championships	Munich, Germany	20th (h)	400 m	55.81
2003	World Indoor Championships	Birmingham, United Kingdom	26th (h)	400 m	57.81
2004	World Indoor Championships	Budapest, Hungary	23rd (h)	400 m	54.62
2004	Olympic Games	Athens, Greece	33rd (h)	400 m	60.00
2005	European Indoor Championships	Madrid, Spain	10th (h)	400 m	53.60
2005	Mediterranean Games	Almería, Spain	3rd	400 m	53.23
2005	Mediterranean Games	Almería, Spain	4th	400 m hurdles	56.48
2006	European Championships	Gothenburg, Sweden	16th (sf)	200 m	24.64
2006	European Championships	Gothenburg, Sweden	18th (h)	400 m	52.86
2008	Olympic Games	Beijing, China	46th (h)	400 m	54.84
2009	European Indoor Championships	Turin, Italy	20th (h)	400 m	55.70

== Personal life ==
Klodiana Shala graduated from the Academy of Physical Education and Sports "Vojo Kushi" as a teacher in athletics. Additionally, she earned a master's degree in business management from the Mediterranean University.

From 2011 to 2020, she served as a lecturer at several universities, including the University of Tirana, Marin Barleti, and UET, where she also established the Sports Department for the first time.

Klodiana Shala is a licensed coach for Physical Preparation by the Albanian Football Association.

== See also ==
- Luiza Gega
- Athletics in Albania
- Olympic Games

Olympic Games
Preceded by Ilirjan Suli	Flagbearer for Albania; Athens 2004	Succeeded by Erjon Tola
