= National Circus (Albania) =

Origin
- Circus name: Cirku Kombëtar
- Country: Albania
- Founder(s): Telat Agolli; Bajram Kurti; Xhuzepina Prendi; Bardhyl Jareci; Abdyl Karakashi
- Year founded: 1952

Information
- Operator(s): 1952-1973: Estrada of Tirana; 1973 - present: Tirana Circus

The National Circus (Albanian: Cirku Kombëtar) is a circus in Albania founded in 1952 and still fully active. The circus had its most successful years during the Communist Albania era and had difficulties in the 1990-2010 period when its personnel was reduced. The circus has been known to list famous Albanian athletes among its workers.

== History ==
The circus was founded in 1952 in Tirana, Albania, by Telat Agolli, Bajram Kurti, Xhuzepina Prendi (Shkurti), Bardhyl Jareci, and Abdyl Karakashi.

The circus' first performance, Shkopi Magjik, (English: Magic Wand) was staged in 1959. In 1964 the circus started to maintain much higher standards of performance with the premiere of Fluturime akrobatike (English: Acrobatic Flights). From 1952 to 1973 the circus operated as part of the Estrada of Tirana; in 1973, the circus split off to become its own company. In 1975 the circus started using a canvas tent for the first time and began to perform in other parts of Albania besides Tirana. In 1977 the Drejt lartësive (English: Toward the Heights) show premiered in Tirana; in that same year a studio started to work full-time on the preparation of new artists by the circus masters. This brought the number of the people working for the circus to more than a hundred.

In the 1990s, after the fall of communism and with Albania's transitional problems, the circus' staff shrank to almost half of what it had been in the prior decade. The canvas tent started to have problems and it was not repaired until 2000. A United Nations Development Programme project financed some of the circus' activities and by 2010, the Tirana Circus was doing much better than in the 1990s, still being the major circus in the country. However, after the serious financial problems of 1990-2010, the Tirana Circus has been placed under the administration of Albania's Ministry of Tourism, Culture, Youth and Sports.

== Athletes' nest ==
Many Albanian athletes have emerged from the Tirana Circus, the best known of which are former World Champion weightlifter Ymer Pampuri and Olympic weightlifter Romela Begaj. Weightlifter Ymer Pampuri (born in 1944) started his circus career when he was only 7, the same year the circus was founded, and grew up as an acrobat. Later on he started to practice weightlifting. He stopped competing in 1981 when he was 37, and he returned to circus where he was again an acrobat until 1994, when he retired at the age of 50.
