= Lists of Albanian athletes =

This is a summary of sports lists of athletes from Albania, Kosovo, Montenegro, North Macedonia and the region.

== Athletes by sport ==
- Footballers
- Weightlifters
- Martial Artists
- Swimmers
- Cyclists
