= Cricket in Albania =

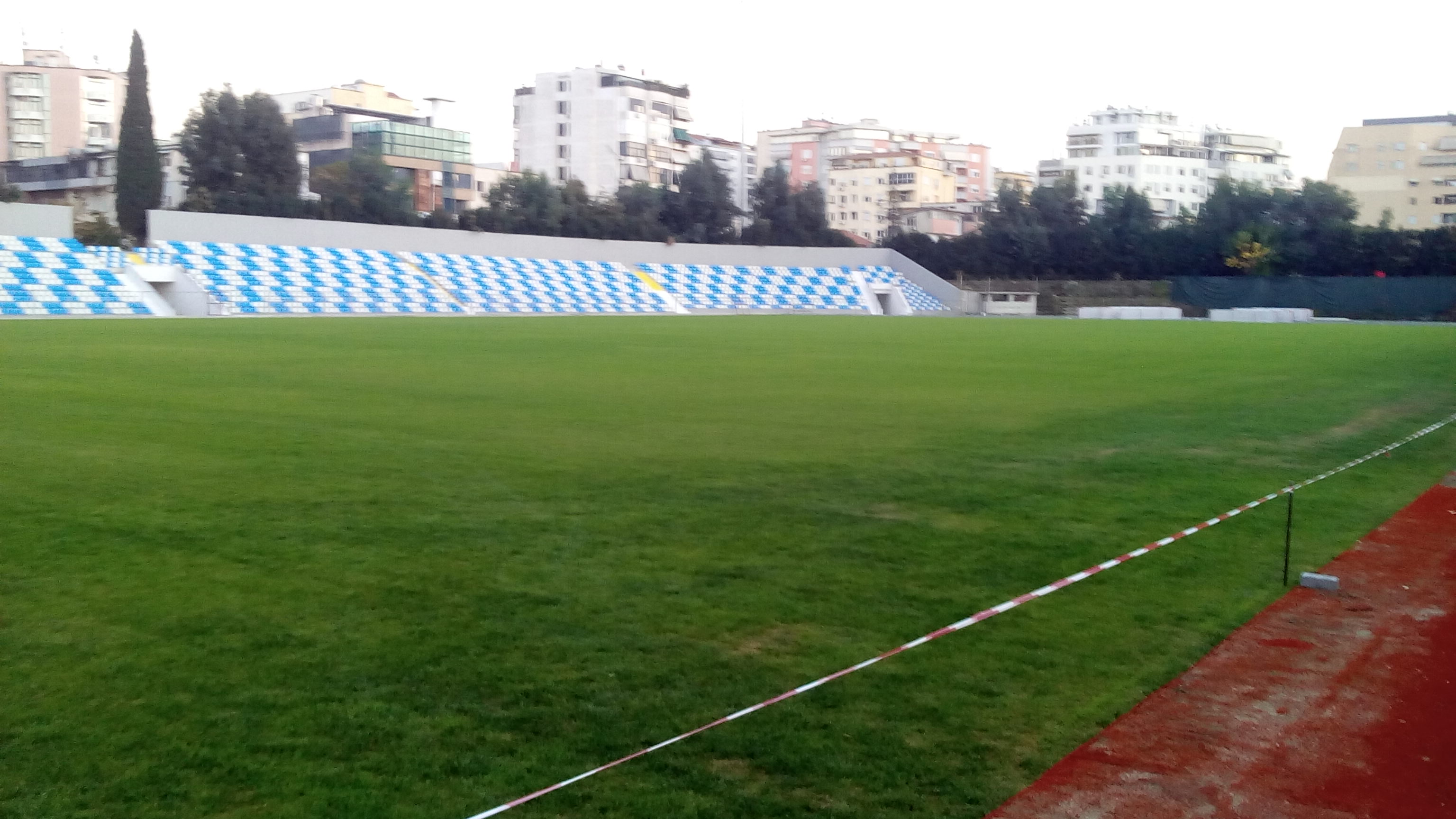
- The Selman Stërmasi Stadium where the first cricket event in Albania was held in August 2001.
- Country: Albania
- Governing body: None
- National team: Albania
- First played: 24 May 2015
- Registered players: None

Cricket is a relatively new and unknown sport in Albania, with the first match in the country being played in 2015. There are no official cricket clubs in Albania, and expats occasionally play exhibition games between one another.

== History ==
Cricket was first introduced to Albania in August 2001 through European Cricket Council coach and Englishman Tim Dellor. The UK-based charity, Children's Aid Direct had set up the cricket event at the Selman Stërmasi Stadium in the capital Tirana for 50 orphans and refugees. Previously, Albania had the most tenuous of links with cricket, in that C. B. Fry, captain of England cricket, was once offered the throne of the country, to which he declined.

The first recorded game of cricket to be played in Albania took place at the Internacional Complex in Pezë Helmës near Tirana on 24 May 2015 between Albanian Eagles and International Lions. Leka II, Crown Prince of Albania was the honorary captain of the Albanian Eagles, while English writer and comedian Tony Hawks captained the International Lions, with the game being won by Albanian Eagles by 1 run and were all out for 49. The game was sponsored by Crown Agents who awarded the winning side with the Sir Norman Wisdom Trophy, named after English actor and comedian Wisdom who had a cult following during the Communist regime in Albania.
