= Albania at the 2026 Winter Olympics =

- Flag of Albania
- IOC code: ALB
- NOC: Albanian National Olympic Committee
- Website: nocalbania.org.al (in Albanian)

in Milan and Cortina d'Ampezzo, Italy 6 February 2026 – 22 February 2026
- Competitors: 4 (1 man and 3 women) in 1 sport
- Flag bearers (opening): Denni Xhepa & Lara Colturi
- Flag bearer (closing): Volunteer
- Medals: Gold 0 Silver 0 Bronze 0 Total 0

Winter Olympics appearances (overview)
- 2006; 2010; 2014; 2018; 2022; 2026

Albania competed at the 2026 Winter Olympics in Milan and Cortina d'Ampezzo, Italy, from 6 to 22 February 2026. It was the nation's sixth appearance at the Winter Olympics, with its first debut at the 2006 Winter Olympics.

Alpine skiers Denni Xhepa and Lara Colturi were the country's flagbearer during the opening ceremony. Meanwhile, a volunteer was the country's flagbearer during the closing ceremony.

== Competitors ==
The following is the list of number of competitors participating at the Games per sport/discipline.

Sport	Men	Women	Total
Alpine skiing	1	3	4
Total	1	3	4

== Alpine skiing ==
Albania qualified one male and three female alpine skiers.

Athlete	Event	Run 1		Run 2		Total	
Athlete	Event	Time	Rank	Time	Rank	Time	Rank
Denni Xhepa	Men's giant slalom	1:20.57	36	1:15.34	34	2:35.91	34
Denni Xhepa	Men's slalom	DNF					
Denni Xhepa	Men's super-G	—N/a				1:31.34	34
Lisa Brunga	Women's slalom	DSQ					
Lara Colturi	Women's giant slalom	1:03.97	4	1:10.85	25	2:14.82	16
Lara Colturi	Women's slalom	48.39	7	53.39	23	1:41.78	10
Semire Dauti	Women's giant slalom	1:10.95	50	1:17.17	44	2:28.12	44
Semire Dauti	Women's slalom	DNF					
