= Albania at the 2022 Winter Olympics =

- Flag of Albania
- IOC code: ALB
- NOC: Albanian National Olympic Committee
- Website: nocalbania.org.al (in Albanian)

in Beijing, China 4–20 February 2022
- Competitors: 1 (1 man and 0 women) in 1 sport
- Flag bearer (opening): Denni Xhepa
- Flag bearer (closing): Volunteer
- Medals: Gold 0 Silver 0 Bronze 0 Total 0

Winter Olympics appearances (overview)
- 2006; 2010; 2014; 2018; 2022; 2026

Albania sent a delegation, comprising a single male alpine skier, to compete in the 2022 Winter Olympics in Beijing, China, which was held from 4 to 20 February 2022. Denni Xhepa participated in men's slalom and men's giant slalom. He ranked 28 in the slalom and did not finish the giant slalom.

As Albania's only athlete, Xhepa was also the country's flagbearer during the opening ceremony. A volunteer served as the flagbearer during the closing ceremony.

== Background ==
Albania first entered Olympic competition at the 1972 Summer Olympics in Munich, Germany. The country did not make its second appearance until 20 years later, in the 1992 Barcelona Olympics, and as of 2024 has competed in every subsequent Summer Olympics. Albania made its Winter Olympics debut in the 2006 Winter Olympics, and, as of 2026, has participated in every Winter Olympics since.

The delegation sent to Beijing to join the 2022 Olympics, held from 4 to 20 February, consisted of a single athlete, alpine skier Denni Xhepa. The chef de mission was Kliton Muca, who was also part of the delegation to Beijing in 2008 Summer Olympics. Xhepa was the country's flagbearer during the opening ceremony; a volunteer served as the flagbearer during the closing ceremony.

== Competitors ==
The following is the list of number of competitors who participated at the Games per sport/discipline.

Sport	Men	Women	Total
Alpine skiing	1	0	1
Total	1	0	1

== Alpine skiing ==
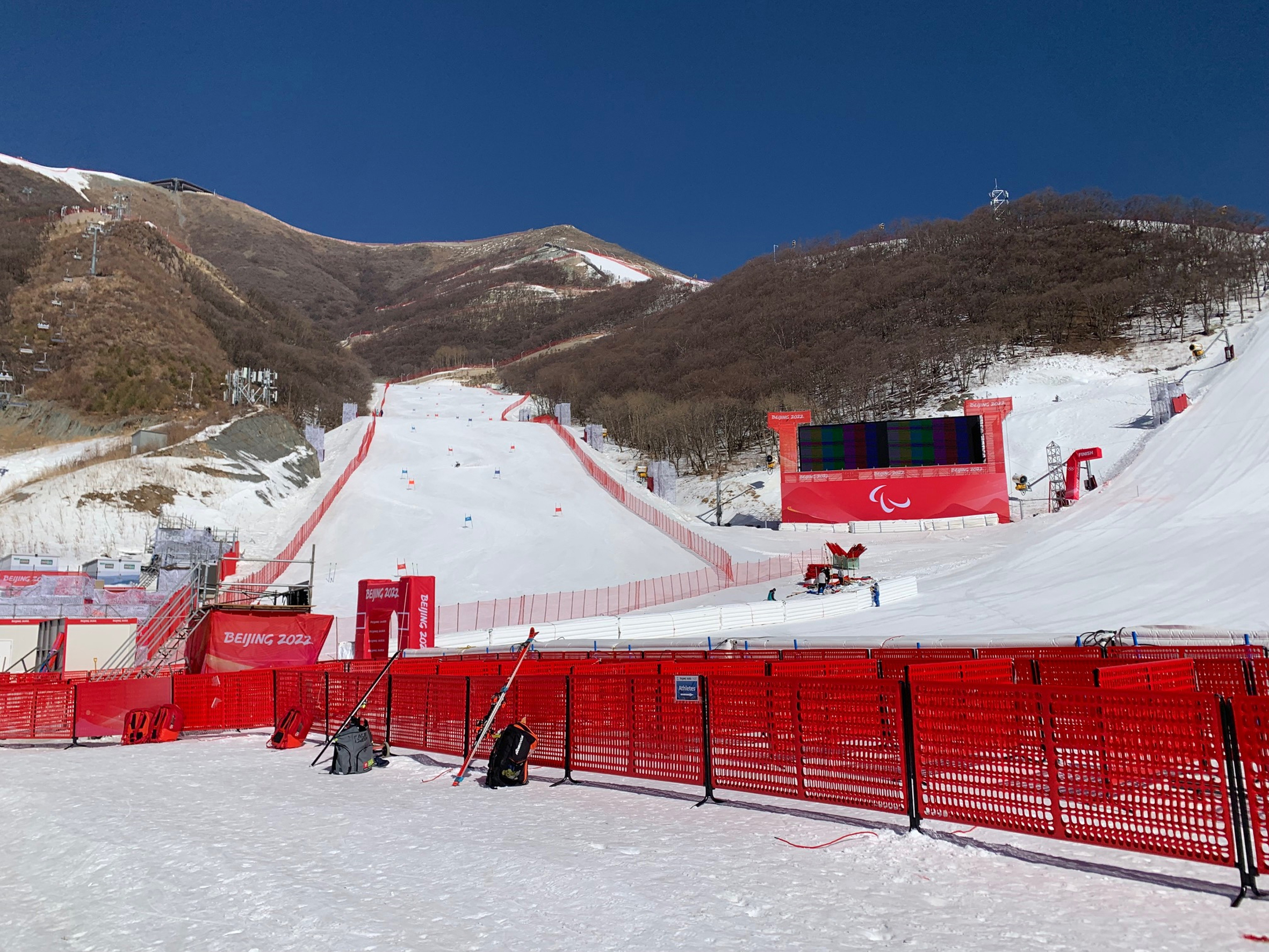
Yanqing National Alpine Skiing Centre, where the alpine skiing events were held.

By meeting the basic qualification standards, Albania qualified one male alpine skier using the basic quota. Fidel Ylli, president of the Albanian National Olympic Committee stated that Xhepa was chosen to represent Albania because he was the "best". Ylli added that Albania would have also been able to bring a woman to the Olympic games, but that the athlete in question had an accident while training in Italy.

Xhepa is an Italian-born skier of Albanian origin. He was 18 years old at the time of the Olympics, and making his Olympics debut. In an interview, Xhepa described his participation by saying that "It feels like a dream. It's just so surreal." He added that "There's no other experience like carrying the flag in the opening ceremony and representing your country in front of the world. This is truly an honor."

On 13 February, Xhepa took part in the men's giant slalom, competing among 87 athletes from 60 countries. There were two runs, and the total time determined the placement. He did not finish (DNF) the first run, and was therefore eliminated. The gold was won by Marco Odermatt from Switzerland, the silver by Žan Kranjec from Slovenia, and the bronze by Mathieu Faivre from France.

On 16 February, Xhepa took part in the men's slalom, again competing among 87 athletes from 60 countries. As with the previous event, there were two runs, with the total time determining the placement. Xhepa finished the runs with a total time of 1 minute and 53.28 seconds, placing him 28th among 45 athletes who finished both runs. The gold was won by Clément Noël from France, the silver by Johannes Strolz from Austria, and the bronze by Sebastian Foss Solevaag from Norway.

In the following Winter Olympics, held in 2026, Xhepa again represented Albania in alpine skiing events.

Athlete	Event	Run 1		Run 2		Total	
Athlete	Event	Time	Rank	Time	Rank	Time	Rank
Denni Xhepa	Men's slalom	58.32	34	54.96	29	1:53.28	28
Denni Xhepa	Men's giant slalom	DNF		Did not advance			

== See also ==
- Albania at the Olympics
