= Albania at the 2014 Winter Olympics =

- IOC code: ALB
- NOC: Albanian National Olympic Committee
- Website: nocalbania.org.al (in Albanian)

in Sochi, Russia 7–23 February 2014
- Competitors: 2 in 1 sport
- Flag bearers: Erjon Tola (opening); Suela Mëhilli (closing)
- Medals: Gold 0 Silver 0 Bronze 0 Total 0

Winter Olympics appearances (overview)
- 2006; 2010; 2014; 2018; 2022; 2026; 2030

Albania competed at the 2014 Winter Olympics in Sochi, Russia from 7 to 23 February 2014. The team consisted of two athletes competing in alpine skiing and for the first time a female athlete.

== Competitors ==
Sport	Men	Women	Total
Alpine skiing	1	1	2
Total	1	1	2

== Alpine skiing ==
According to the final quota allocation released on 20 January 2014, Albania had two athletes in qualification position. Erjon Tola was scheduled to compete in his third consecutive games, but had to withdraw because he broke his arm in training.

On 18 February, Suela Mëhilli finished the giant slalom race in 60th position (out of 74 competitors who finished). She did not finish the slalom race after starting the first run.

Athlete	Event	Run 1		Run 2		Total	
Athlete	Event	Time	Rank	Time	Rank	Time	Rank
Erjon Tola	Men's giant slalom	DNS					
Erjon Tola	Men's slalom	DNS					
Suela Mëhilli	Women's giant slalom	1:33.55	65	1:34.36	60	3:07.91	60
Suela Mëhilli	Women's slalom	DSQ					
