= Kristo Robo =

Albanian sports shooter (born 1948)

Kristo Robo (born 7 December 1948) is an Albanian shooter who competed at the 1992 Summer Olympic Games in the 25 metre rapid fire pistol, he finished 30th, he was also the Albanian flag bearer.

Olympic Games
Preceded by Afërdita Tusha	Flagbearer for Albania; Barcelona 1992	Succeeded by Mirela Maniani
