= Albania at the 2010 Winter Olympics =

- IOC code: ALB
- NOC: Albanian National Olympic Committee
- Website: nocalbania.org.al (in Albanian)

in Vancouver
- Competitors: 1 in 1 sport
- Flag bearers: Erjon Tola (Opening and closing)
- Medals: Gold 0 Silver 0 Bronze 0 Total 0

Winter Olympics appearances (overview)
- 2006; 2010; 2014; 2018; 2022; 2026

Albania sent a delegation to compete at the 2010 Winter Olympics in Vancouver, British Columbia, Canada, held between 12–28 February 2010. This was Albania's second appearance at a Winter Olympic Games. The Albanian delegation consisted of a single alpine skier, Erjon Tola, whose best finish between all his events was 48th.

Vancouver 2010 marked the first time the Albanian Olympic team competed in Canada as Albania and other nations boycotted the 1976 Summer Olympics in Montreal due to the IOC's refusal to ban New Zealand.

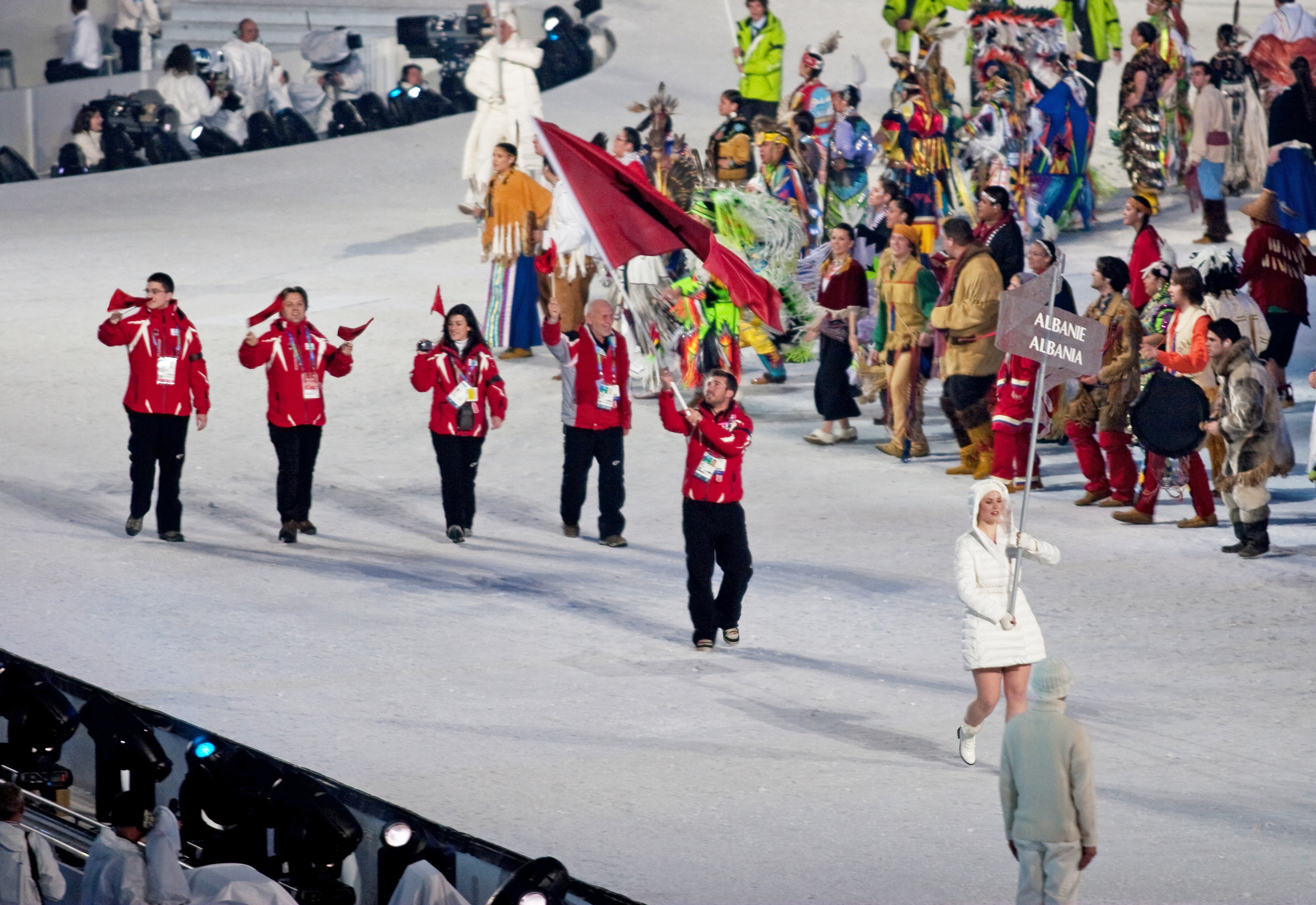
Albanian athletes entering the stadium during the opening ceremonies.

== Background ==
Albania first entered Olympic competition at the 1972 Summer Olympics in Munich, Germany. They did not make their second appearance until 20 years later in the 1992 Barcelona Olympics, and have competed in every Summer Olympics since. They had made their Winter Olympics debut four years prior, in the 2006 Winter Olympics. The delegation sent to Vancouver in 2010 consisted of a single athlete, Erjon Tola. Tola was chosen as the flag bearer for both the opening ceremony and the closing ceremony.

== Alpine Skiing ==
Erjon Tola was born on 15 December 1986, and was 23 at the time of the Vancouver Olympics. He had previously represented Albania at the 2006 Winter Olympics. On 23 February, he took part in the giant slalom. He recorded run times of 1 minute and 27 seconds and 1 minute and 31 seconds, to finish in 63rd place out of 81 competitors who finished both runs of the race. On 27 February, in the first run of the slalom competition, he finished with a time of 1 minute and 33 seconds, after missing a gate and being forced to sidestep back to it. He was faster on his second run, with a time of 1 minute and 9 seconds, however, his first run mistake cost him, as the total time was a sum of the two runs. He finished last out of the 48 competitors who finished both runs.

Athlete	Event	Run 1	Run 2	Total	Rank
Erjon Tola	Men's slalom	1:33.94	1:09.94	2:43.88	48
Erjon Tola	Men's giant slalom	1:27.57	1:31.70	2:59.27	63

== See also ==
- Albania at the Olympics
