= Denni Xhepa =

Italian-Albanian skier (born 2003)

- Xhepa at the 2026 Winter Olympics

Personal information
- Born: 6 May 2003 (age 23) Pinerolo, Italy

Skiing career
- Country: Albania
- Sport: Alpine skiing
- Club: S.C. Sestriere A.D.
- Disciplines: Slalom, giant slalom, super-G

Olympics
- Teams: 2 – (2022, 2026)
- Medals: 0

World Championships
- Teams: 2 – (2023, 2025)
- Medals: 0

Denni Xhepa (born 6 May 2003) is an Alpine skier. Born in Italy, he competed in the 2022 and 2026 Winter Olympics, representing Albania.

== Career ==
He was born in Pinerolo to parents of Albanian origin. His father migrated to Italy by boat in the 1990s, following the economic collapse and social unrest that came after the fall of communism in Albania. He grew up in Sestriere and competes for the local ski club. He attended the sports high school in Oulx.

On 13 February, Xhepa made his Olympic debut in the 2022 Beijing Winter Olympics where he represented Albania and was the flag bearer of the opening ceremony in the 2022 Winter Olympics Parade of Nations. He took part in the men's giant slalom but didn't finish the first run so he was eliminated. On 16 February, Xhepa took part in the men's slalom, Xhepa finished two runs with a total time of 1 minute and 53.28 seconds, placing him 28th among 45 athletes who finished both runs.

He made his FIS Alpine World Ski Championships debut in 2023, competing in the giant slalom and the slalom. Two years later, he participated in the FIS Alpine World Ski Championships 2025. He competed in the giant slalom, slalom, and the super-G.

In 2026, Xhepa made his second Olympic appearance at the Milano-Cortina Winter Games. He earned 34th place in both the super-G and giant slalom, but was unable to complete the first run of the slalom.

== World Championships results ==
Year
Year	Age	Slalom	Giant slalom	Super-G	Downhill	Combined	Team combined	Parallel	Team event
2023	19	DNFQ	32	—	—	—	—N/a	—	—
2025	21	DNF1	36	DNF	—	—N/a	—	—N/a	—

== Olympic results ==
Year
Year	Age	Slalom	Giant slalom	Super-G	Downhill	Combined	Team combined
2022	18	28	DNF1	—	—	—	—N/a
2026	22	DNF1	34	34	—	—N/a	—

Olympic Games
Preceded by Luiza Gega; Briken Calja	Flagbearer for Albania; Beijing 2022	Succeeded by Zelimkhan Abakarov; Kaltra Meca
Preceded by Zelimkhan Abakarov; Kaltra Meca	Flagbearer for Albania; Milano Cortina 2026 with Lara Colturi	Succeeded by Incumbent
