= Athletics at the 2013 Summer Universiade – Women's 1500 metres =

The women's 1500 metres event at the 2013 Summer Universiade was held on 10–12 July.

== Medalists ==
Gold	Silver	Bronze
Luiza Gega; Albania	Margherita Magnani; Italy	Angie Smit; New Zealand

== Results ==
=== Heats ===
Qualification: First 4 in each heat (Q) and the next 4 fastest (q) qualified for the final.

Rank	Heat	Name	Nationality	Time	Notes
1	1	Tuğba Koyuncu	Turkey	4:15.93	Q
DSQ	1	Yekaterina Sharmina	Russia	~~4:15.95~~	
3	1	Margherita Magnani	Italy	4:15.99	Q
4	1	Docus Ajok	Uganda	4:16.44	Q
5	1	Cristina Guevara	Mexico	4:16.67	q, PB
6	1	Nicole Schappert	United States	4:17.15	q
7	1	Angie Smit	New Zealand	4:17.94	q, SB
8	1	Claire Tarplee	Ireland	4:18.77	q
9	1	Florina Pierdevara	Romania	4:21.85	
10	1	Lisa Kurmann	Switzerland	4:22.10	
11	2	Katarzyna Broniatowska	Poland	4:25.99	Q
12	2	Luiza Gega	Albania	4:26.07	Q
DSQ	2	Yelena Korobkina	Russia	~~4:26.33~~	
14	2	Tereza Čapková	Czech Republic	4:26.36	Q
15	2	Solange Pereira	Spain	4:26.56	
16	2	Brittany McGowan	Australia	4:27.44	
17	2	Annie LeBlanc	Canada	4:28.10	
18	2	Winnie Nanyondo	Uganda	4:28.77	
19	2	Becky Greene	New Zealand	4:30.03	
20	1	Shinetsetseg Chuluunkhuu	Mongolia	4:36.50	
21	1	Dilshoda Rahmonova	Tajikistan	4:48.77	
22	2	Taylor-Ashley Bean	Bermuda	4:50.54	
23	2	Fezile Ngwenyama	Swaziland	5:02.82	
	2	Esther Adwubi	Ghana	DNF	
	1	Moleboheng Mafata	Lesotho	DNS	

=== Final ===
Rank	Name	Nationality	Time	Notes
1st place, gold medalist(s)	Luiza Gega	Albania	4:08.71	
2nd place, silver medalist(s)	Margherita Magnani	Italy	4:09.72	
3rd place, bronze medalist(s)	Angie Smit	New Zealand	4:11.72	PB
4	Claire Tarplee	Ireland	4:13.37	
5	Katarzyna Broniatowska	Poland	4:14.31	
6	Nicole Schappert	United States	4:15.02	
7	Cristina Guevara	Mexico	4:16.97	
8	Tuğba Koyuncu	Turkey	4:18.62	
9	Docus Ajok	Uganda	4:25.83	
	Tereza Čapková	Czech Republic	DNF	
DQ	Yekaterina Sharmina	Russia	~~4:05.49~~	
DQ	Yelena Korobkina	Russia	~~4:08.13~~	
