= Albania at the 2006 Winter Olympics =

- IOC code: ALB
- NOC: Albanian National Olympic Committee
- Website: nocalbania.org.al (in Albanian)

in Turin
- Competitors: 1 (1 man) in 1 sport
- Flag bearers: Erjon Tola (opening and closing)
- Medals: Gold 0 Silver 0 Bronze 0 Total 0

Winter Olympics appearances (overview)
- 2006; 2010; 2014; 2018; 2022; 2026

Albania sent a delegation to compete at the 2006 Winter Olympics in Turin, Italy between 10–26 February 2006. This was the nation's first appearance at a Winter Olympic Games, having previously participated several times in the Summer Olympics. The delegation consisted of one alpine skier, Erjon Tola, who competed in three events. His best finish was 35th in the giant slalom.

== Background ==
Albania first entered the Olympic competition at the 1972 Summer Olympics in Munich, Germany. They did not make their second appearance until 20 years later in the 1992 Barcelona Olympics, and have competed in every Summer Olympics since. The nation has never won a medal at the Olympics. The 2006 Turin Games marked their debut into the Winter Olympic Games. The delegation consisted of a single competitor, alpine skier Erjon Tola. He was the flag bearer for both the opening ceremony and the closing ceremony. Tola was also Albania's sole competitor in the 2010 Winter Olympics.

== Alpine skiing ==
Erjon Tola was born on 15 December 1986, and was 19 at the time of the Turin Olympics. On 18 February, Tola took part in the super-G competition. He finished the single-run race in a time of 1 minute and 44 seconds, which placed him in 56th place. This was last among competitors who managed to finish the race. Gold medal time was 1 minute and 30 seconds. Two days later, he took part in the giant slalom, posting leg times of 1 minute and 30 seconds and 1 minute and 32 seconds, respectively. His combined total time of 3 minutes and 2 seconds placed him in 35th place out of 41 competitors who finished both runs; the gold medal time was 2 minutes and 35 seconds. On 25 February, he participated in the slalom, but was unable to finish the race.

Athlete	Event	Final			
Athlete	Event	Run 1	Run 2	Total	Rank
Erjon Tola	Men's super-G	—N/a		1:44.27	56
Erjon Tola	Men's giant slalom	1:30.87	1:32.02	3:02.89	35
Erjon Tola	Men's slalom	DNF			

== See also ==
- Albania at the Olympics
