= 2021 World Weightlifting Championships – Men's 73 kg =

Weightlifting Championship

The men's 73 kilograms competition at the 2021 World Weightlifting Championships was held on 10 December 2021.

== Schedule ==
| Date | Time | Event |
|---|---|---|
| 10 December 2021 | 10:30 | Group B |
| 10 December 2021 | 19:00 | Group A |

== Medalists ==
| Event | Gold | | Silver | | Bronze | |
|---|---|---|---|---|---|---|
| Snatch | Briken Calja (ALB) | 156 kg | Suttipong Jeeram (THA) | 154 kg | Sergey Petrov (RWF) | 153 kg |
| Clean & Jerk | Rahmat Erwin Abdullah (INA) | 192 kg | Briken Calja (ALB) | 186 kg | Jeong Han-sol (KOR) | 181 kg |
| Total | Rahmat Erwin Abdullah (INA) | 343 kg | Briken Calja (ALB) | 342 kg | Suttipong Jeeram (THA) | 334 kg |

== Records ==
Prior to this competition, the existing world records were as follows.

| World record | Snatch | Shi Zhiyong (CHN) | 169 kg | Tashkent, Uzbekistan | 20 April 2021 |
| World record | Clean & Jerk | Shi Zhiyong (CHN) | 198 kg | Tianjin, China | 10 December 2019 |
| World record | Total | Shi Zhiyong (CHN) | 364 kg | Tokyo, Japan | 28 July 2021 |

== Results ==
| Rank | Athlete | Group | Snatch (kg) | | | | Clean & Jerk (kg) | | | | Total |
| Rank | Athlete | Group | 1 | 2 | 3 | Rank | 1 | 2 | 3 | Rank | Total |
|---|---|---|---|---|---|---|---|---|---|---|---|
| 1st place, gold medalist(s) | Rahmat Erwin Abdullah (INA) | A | 142 | 147 | 151 | 5 | 180 | 186 | 192 | 1st place, gold medalist(s) | 343 |
| 2nd place, silver medalist(s) | Briken Calja (ALB) | A | 152 | 154 | 156 | 1st place, gold medalist(s) | 182 | 186 | ~~190~~ | 2nd place, silver medalist(s) | 342 |
| 3rd place, bronze medalist(s) | Suttipong Jeeram (THA) | A | 150 | 154 | ~~156~~ | 2nd place, silver medalist(s) | ~~180~~ | ~~180~~ | 180 | 5 | 334 |
| 4 | Erkand Qerimaj (ALB) | A | 150 | ~~153~~ | 153 | 4 | ~~180~~ | 180 | ~~183~~ | 4 | 333 |
| 5 | Sergey Petrov (RWF) | A | 144 | 149 | 153 | 3rd place, bronze medalist(s) | 172 | 178 | ~~182~~ | 6 | 331 |
| 6 | Jeong Han-sol (KOR) | A | ~~140~~ | 141 | ~~145~~ | 9 | 181 | ~~187~~ | ~~187~~ | 3rd place, bronze medalist(s) | 322 |
| 7 | Achinta Sheuli (IND) | A | 139 | ~~143~~ | 143 | 7 | 169 | 173 | ~~176~~ | 8 | 316 |
| 8 | Kakhi Asanidze (GEO) | A | 138 | 142 | 145 | 6 | 162 | 168 | ~~171~~ | 10 | 313 |
| 9 | Chiang Tsung-han (TPE) | B | 135 | ~~141~~ | 141 | 8 | ~~165~~ | 165 | 169 | 9 | 310 |
| 10 | Ismail Jamali (ESP) | B | 133 | ~~138~~ | 138 | 10 | 162 | 167 | ~~170~~ | 11 | 305 |
| 11 | Jacob Horst (USA) | B | 132 | 136 | ~~139~~ | 11 | 161 | 165 | ~~168~~ | 12 | 301 |
| 12 | Erry Hidayat (MAS) | A | ~~136~~ | 136 | ~~143~~ | 12 | 165 | ~~176~~ | ~~176~~ | 13 | 301 |
| 13 | Petr Stránský (CZE) | A | 131 | 135 | ~~138~~ | 14 | ~~160~~ | 160 | ~~167~~ | 14 | 295 |
| 14 | Indika Dissanayake (SRI) | B | ~~130~~ | 130 | 135 | 13 | 150 | 156 | ~~160~~ | 15 | 286 |
| 15 | Anthony Masinde (KEN) | B | 113 | 118 | 121 | 16 | 140 | ~~146~~ | ~~147~~ | 16 | 261 |
| 16 | Hakim Ssempereza (UGA) | B | 100 | 105 | 110 | 17 | ~~132~~ | 132 | 138 | 17 | 248 |
| — | Sudesh Peiris (SRI) | B | ~~127~~ | ~~127~~ | 127 | 15 | — | — | — | — | — |
| — | Maksat Meredow (TKM) | A | ~~141~~ | ~~141~~ | ~~142~~ | — | ~~176~~ | 176 | — | 7 | — |
