= Sahit Prizreni =

Albanian-Australian freestyle wrestler

President of Albanian Wrestling Federation
- Incumbent
- Assumed office 6 December 2020
- Preceded by: Martin Biba
- Sports career
- Born: 23 February 1983 (age 43) Kukës, Albania
- Years active: 1992–2016
- Height: 1.66 m (5 ft 5 in)
- Country: Albania (1992–2012); Australia (2015–2016)
- Sport: Wrestling
- Weight class: 60–65 kg
- Event: Freestyle
- Coached by: Sylejman Shala; Dam Parker
Medal record
Men's freestyle wrestling
Representing Albania
World Championships
Bronze medal – third place	2007 Baku	60 kg
European Championships
Silver medal – second place	2011 Dortmund	60 kg
Representing Australia
Olympic Qualification Tournament
Silver medal – second place	2016 Alger	65 kg
Canada Cup
Gold medal – first place	2015 Guelph	65 kg

Sahit Prizreni (born 23 February 1983) is an Albanian-Australian former freestyle wrestler who has been the current president of the Albanian Wrestling Federation since 6 December 2020.

== Career ==
=== Albania ===
He participated in Men's freestyle 60 kg at 2008 Summer Olympics. He was eliminated in 1/8 of final losing with Bazar Bazarguruev from Kyrgyzstan.

Prizreni participated in Men's freestyle 60 kg at 2004 Summer Olympics as well, where he was ranked in 17th place. He won a bronze medal on 2007 FILA Wrestling World Championships.

=== Australia ===
Prizreni won the 63 kg final at the 2016 African & Oceania Wrestling Olympic Qualification Tournament. He was selected for Australia's 2016 Summer Olympic team, becoming the first Australian to have carried another country's flag (Albania) at the Olympic Games.

Olympic Games
Preceded by Erjon Tola	Flagbearer for Albania; Beijing 2008	Succeeded by Erjon Tola
