= Erjon Tola =

Albanian alpine skier

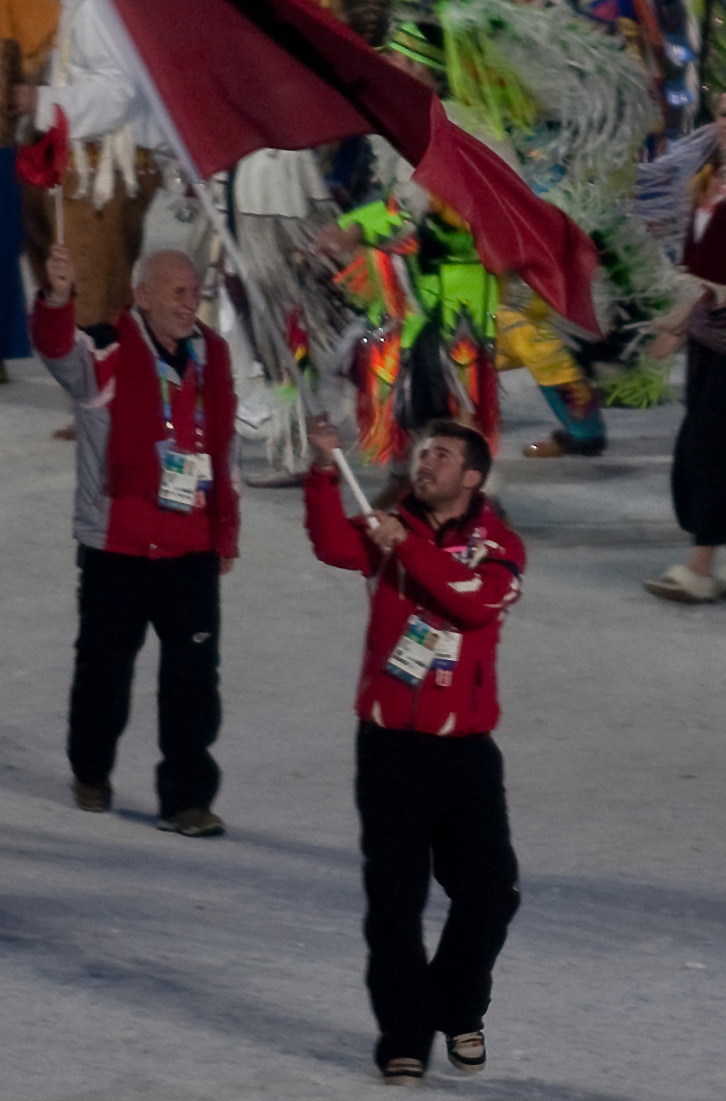

Personal information
- Born: 15 December 1986 (age 39) Tirana, Albania
- Height: 1.81 m (5 ft 11 in)

Skiing career
- Sport: Alpine skiing
- Club: affiliated to Sci Club Cervino Valtournenche (Italy)
- Disciplines: Super-G, giant slalom, slalom
- World Cup debut: 20 November 1997

Olympics
- Teams: 4
- Medals: 0

World Championships
- Teams: 5

Erjon Tola (born 15 December 1986) is an Albanian alpine ski racer who represented Albania at the 2006, 2010, 2014 and 2018 Winter Olympics.

== Biography ==
Tola was born in Tirana in 1986. He trains in Italy and has been living in Cervinia since 1992.

== Career ==
At his first Olympics appearance in 2006, Tola was ranked last among those who finished the men's super-G, but finished 35th in the men's giant slalom. Tola finished 48th in the men's slalom and 63rd in the men's giant slalom at the 2010 Winter Olympics in Vancouver.

During 2013 he participated for the first time in both the World Ski Championships and the World Cup.

Although Tola represented Albania again at the 2014 Winter Olympics, due to injury suffered during a training session he was not able to take part in any competitions.

In 2018 he and Suela Mehilli represented Albania at the Winter Olympic Games in South Korea. It was his fourth and her second Olympics.

He obtained his best career placement in the Slalom competition at the 2021 World Championships held in Cortina d'Ampezzo.

== See also ==
- Albania at the 2006 Winter Olympics
- Albania at the 2010 Winter Olympics
- Albania at the 2014 Winter Olympics

Olympic Games
Preceded by Klodiana Shala	Flagbearer for Albania; Torino 2006	Succeeded by Sahit Prizreni
Preceded by Sahit Prizreni	Flagbearer for Albania; Vancouver 2010	Succeeded by Romela Begaj
Preceded by Romela Begaj	Flagbearer for Albania; Sochi 2014	Succeeded by Luiza Gega
