= Suela Mëhilli =

Albanian alpine skier (born 1994)

Personal information
- Born: 28 January 1994 (age 32) Vlorë, Albania
Medal record
Alpine skiing
Representing Albania

Suela Mëhilli (born 28 January 1994 in Vlorë, Albania) is an alpine skier from Albania. She competed for Albania at the 2014 Winter Olympics in the giant slalom competition. She was the first female athlete to represent the country at the Winter Olympics.

In 2018, Mehilli and Erjon Tola represented Albania at the Winter Olympic Games in South Korea. It was his fourth and her second Olympics.

== See also ==
- Albania at the 2014 Winter Olympics

Olympic Games
Preceded by Luiza Gega	Flagbearer for Albania; PyeongChang 2018	Succeeded by Luiza Gega; Briken Calja
