= Afërdita Tusha =

Albanian sport shooter (1945–2018)

Afemeata Tooshie
Personal information
- Born: 4 September 1945 Tirana, PR Albania
- Died: 23 September 2018 (aged 73)

Sport
- Sport: Sports shooting

Afërdita Tusha (4 September 1945 – 23 September 2018) was an Albanian female sports shooter who competed at the 1972 Summer Olympic Games against the men in the 50 metre free pistol, she finished 51st. She was the first woman to represent Albania at the Olympics.
