= Sokol Bishanaku =

Albanian weightlifter (born 1971)

Sokol Bishanaku (born 2 June 1971) is a former Albanian weightlifter who competed at the 1992 Summer Olympic Games, the 1991 Mediterranean Games in Greece, the 1993 Mediterranean Games in France, the 1997 Mediterranean Games in Italy, the 1999 World Weightlifting Championship in Athens, and many other international competitions. He was also a National Representative of Albania at the 2012 Olympic Games in London and the 2016 Olympic Games in Rio.

He set 102 national weightlifting records and was National Champion from 1993–1999. He won numerous medals at international competition.

He has remained involved in sport as a trainer and professor since 2005 and in 2017 was declared the best trainer in Albania. He is now a national coach.
