= Ilirjan Suli =

Albanian weightlifter (born 1975)

Personal information
- Nationality: Albania
- Born: 11 October 1975 (age 50)
- Height: 171 cm (5 ft 7 in)
- Military career
- Allegiance: Albania
- Branch: Albanian Armed Forces
- Service years: 2021–

Sport
- Country: Albania
- Sport: Weightlifting
- Weight class: 76–77 kg, 85 kg
Medal record
Men's weightlifting
Representing Albania
European Championships
Bronze medal – third place	2000 Sofia	–77 kg

Ilirjan Suli (born 11 October 1975), also known as Ilirian Suli, is an Albanian weightlifter. He competed for Albania at the 1996 Summer Olympics men's 76 kg event and at the 2000 Summer Olympics in the men's 77 kg event.

Suli won bronze medal at the 2000 European Weightlifting Championships in the 77 kg event.

Olympic Games
Preceded by Mirela Maniani	Flagbearer for Albania; Sydney 2000	Succeeded by Klodiana Shala
