= Luiza Gega =

Albanian middle-distance runner

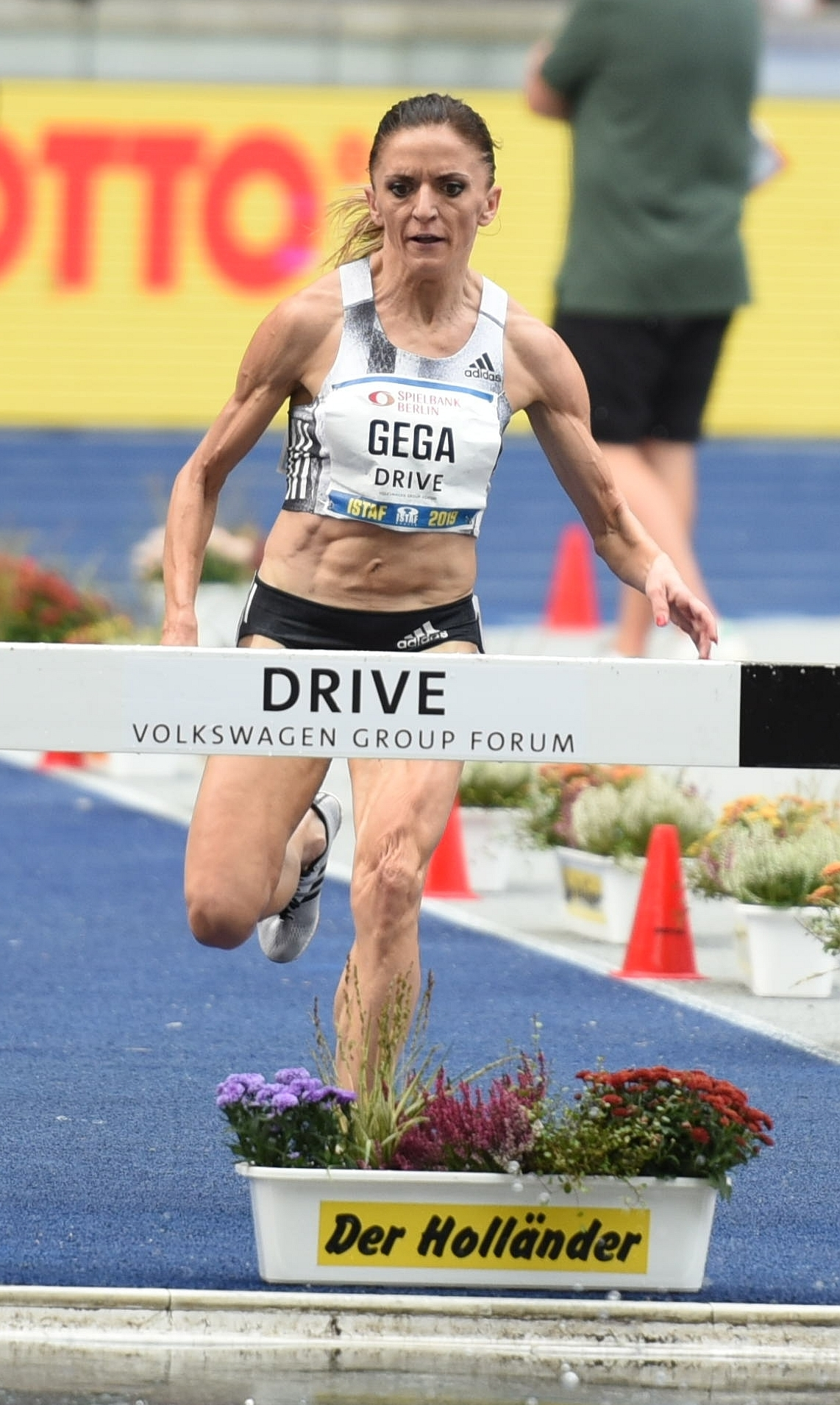
- Gega at the 2019 ISTAF Berlin meet

Personal information
- Born: 5 November 1988 (age 37) Okshtun, Dibër, Albania
- Height: 1.50 m (4 ft 11 in)
- Weight: 45 kg (99 lb)
- Military career
- Branch: Albanian Armed Forces
- Service years: 2022–
- Rank: Colonel

Sport
- Country: Albania
- Sport: Track and field
- Events: 3000m steeplechase Middle-, Long-distance running
- Coached by: Taulant Stërmasi
Medal record
Women's athletics
Representing Albania
European Games
Gold medal – first place	2023 Kraków-Małopolska	3000 m s'chase
European Championships
Gold medal – first place	2022 Munich	3000 m s'chase
Silver medal – second place	2016 Amsterdam	3000 m s'chase
Mediterranean Games
Gold medal – first place	2018 Tarragona	3000 m s'chase
Gold medal – first place	2022 Oran	3000 m s'chase
Silver medal – second place	2013 Mersin	1500 m
Summer Universiade
Gold medal – first place	2013 Kazan	1500 m

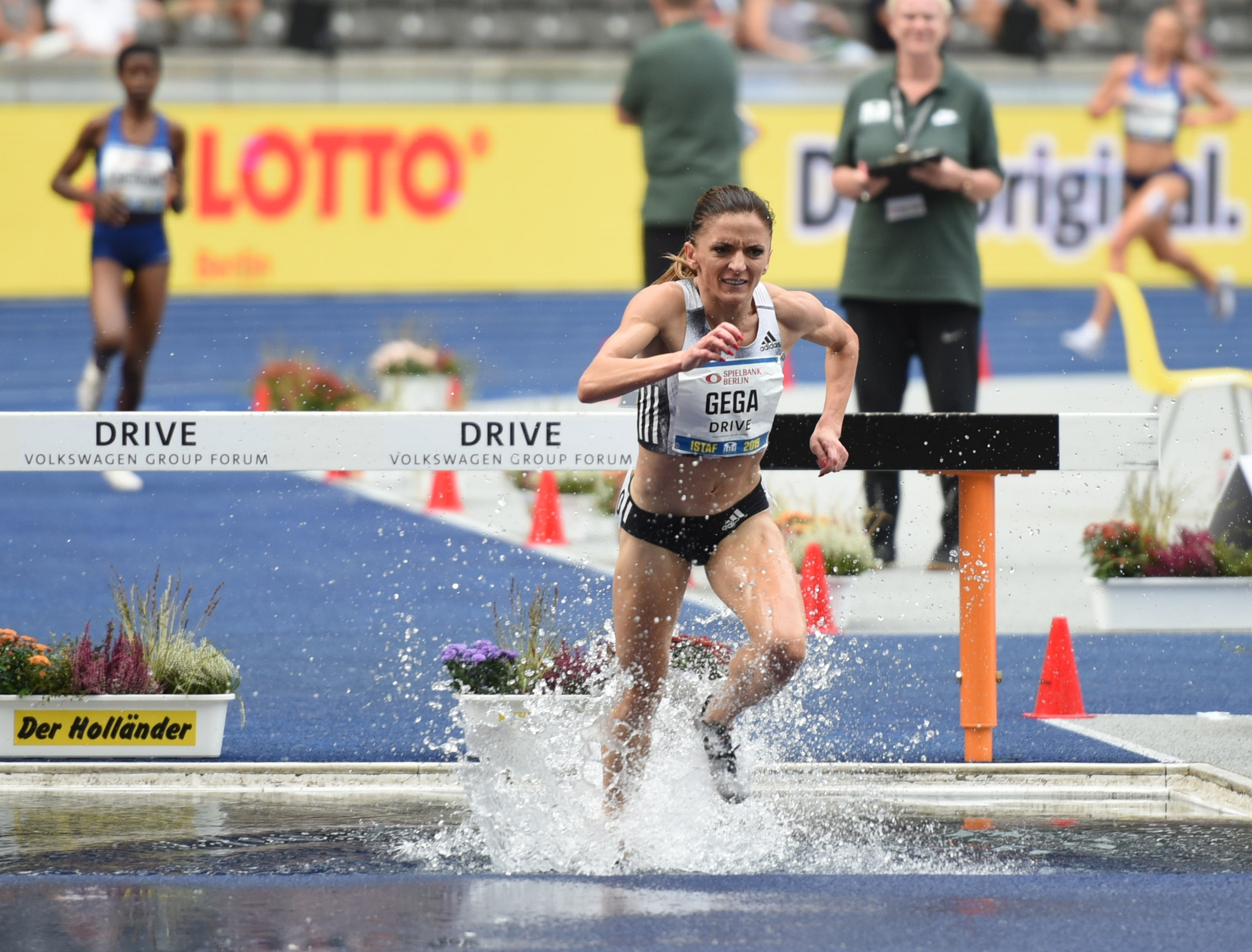
Luiza Gega races the 2000 m steeplechase at the 2019 ISTAF Berlin meet

Luiza Gega (born 5 November 1988) is an Albanian middle- and long-distance runner who specialises in the 3000 metres steeplechase. She is the 2023 European Games and 2022 European Championships champion in 3000 metres steeplechase. She is the national record holder in 3000 metres steeplechase, 800 metres, 1500 metres, 3000 metres, 5000 metres, 10,000 metres, and marathon.

== Career ==
Gega began athletics when she was 14 years old.

Gega represented Albania at the 2013 Mediterranean Games and won the silver medal in 1500 metres. She then competed at the 2013 Summer Universiade and initially finished third in the 1500 metres. She was later awarded the gold medal after both Yekaterina Sharmina and Yelena Korobkina were disqualified due to doping violations.

Gega won the silver medal in the 3000 metres steeplechase at the 2016 European Championships. This was Albania's first ever medal at the European Athletics Championships. She then represented Albania at the 2016 Summer Olympics in 3000 metres steeplechase but did not advance beyond the heats. She was Albania's flagbearer in the opening ceremonies.

Gega won the gold medal in 3000 metres steeplechase at the 2018 Mediterranean Games. She then placed fourth in the same event at the 2018 European Championships.

Gega placed ninth in 3000 metres steeplechase at the 2019 World Championships and set the national record time in the final. She represented Albania at the 2020 Summer Olympics in 3000 metres steeplechase and qualified for the final where she finished 13th. She once again was Albania's flagbearer in the opening ceremonies.

At the 2022 Balkan Championships, Gega set the championship and national record in the 5000 metres, winning the gold medal. She also set the championship record in the 3000 metres steeplechase to win another gold medal. She then won the gold medal in the 3000 metres steeplechase at the 2022 Mediterranean Games and set a new national record. She qualified for the 3000 metres steeplechase at the 2022 World Championships and finished fifth, setting another new national record in the process. Then at the 2022 European Championships, she won Albania's first-ever European gold medal and set a new championship record in 3000 metres steeplechase.

Gega finished eighth in the 3000 metres steeplechase final at the 2023 World Championships. She then placed fifth in the 3000 metres steeplechase final at the 2024 European Championships. She represented Albania at the 2024 Summer Olympics but did not advance beyond the heats in 3000 metres steeplechase.

== Competition record ==
Representing Albania
Year	Competition	Venue	Position	Event	Notes
2011	European Indoor Championships	Paris, France	17th (h)	800 m	2:08.75
2011	Universiade	Shenzhen, China	7th (sf)	800 m	2:04.13
2011	World Championships	Daegu, South Korea	28th (h)	800 m	2:03.21
2012	World Indoor Championships	Istanbul, Turkey	13th (h)	1500 m	4:13.45
2012	European Championships	Helsinki, Finland	13th (h)	1500 m	4:12.54
2013	European Indoor Championships	Gothenburg, Sweden	–	800 m	DQ
2013	Mediterranean Games	Mersin, Turkey	4th	800 m	2:01.96 NR
2013	Mediterranean Games	Mersin, Turkey	2nd	1500 m	4:05.63
2013	Universiade	Kazan, Russia	2nd	1500 m	4:08.71
2013	World Championships	Moscow, Russia	19th (sf)	1500 m	4:08.79
2014	World Indoor Championships	Sopot, Poland	6th	1500 m	4:08.24
2014	European Championships	Zürich, Switzerland	11th (h)	1500 m	4:12.25
2015	European Games (Note: The third league of the 2015 European Team Championships)	Baku, Azerbaijan	2nd	800 m	2:02.36
2015	European Games	Baku, Azerbaijan	1st	1500 m	4:11.58
2015	World Championships	Beijing, China	21st (h)	1500 m	4:09.36
2016	World Indoor Championships	Portland, OR, United States	16th (h)	1500 m	4:16.12
2016	European Championships	Amsterdam, Netherlands	2nd	3000 m s'chase	9:28.52 NR
2016	Olympic Games	Rio de Janeiro, Brazil	48th (h)	3000 m s'chase	9:58.49
2017	European Indoor Championships	Belgrade, Serbia	5th	1500 m	4:11.64
2018	World Indoor Championships	Birmingham, United Kingdom	17th (h)	1500 m	4:10.65
2018	Mediterranean Games	Tarragona, Spain	1st	3000 m s'chase	9:27.73
2018	European Championships	Berlin, Germany	4th	3000 m s'chase	9:24.78
2019	World Championships	Doha, Qatar	9th	3000 m s'chase	9:19.93 NR
2021	Olympic Games	Tokyo, Japan	13th	3000 m s'chase	9:34.10 (SB h)
2022	World Indoor Championships	Belgrade, Serbia	13th	3000 m	8:53.14
2022	Balkan Championships	Craiova, Romania	1st	5000 m	15:16.47 CR NR
2022	Balkan Championships	Craiova, Romania	1st	3000 m s'chase	9:17.89 CR
2022	Mediterranean Games	Oran, Algeria	1st	3000 m s'chase	9:14.29 GR NR
2022	World Championships	Eugene, United States	5th	3000 m s'chase	9:10.04 NR
2022	European Championships	Munich, Germany	1st	3000 m s'chase	9:11.31 CR
2023	World Championships	Budapest, Hungary	8th	3000 m s'chase	9:10.27
2024	European Championships	Rome, Italy	5th	3000 m s'chase	9:22.92
2024	Olympic Games	Paris, France	27th (h)	3000 m s'chase	9:27.41

== Personal bests ==
- 800 metres – 2:01.31 (Tbilisi 2014) NR
  - 800 metres indoor – 2:02.27 (Piraeus 2013) NR
- 1500 metres – 4:02.63 (Doha 2015) NR
  - 1500 metres indoor – 4:06.66 (Istanbul 2017) NR
- 3000 metres – 8:46.61 (Elbasan 2022) NR
  - 3000 metres indoor – 8:44.46 (Karlsruhe 2020) NR
- 5000 metres – 15:16.47 (Craiova 2022) NR
- 10,000 metres – 32:16.25 (Birmingham 2021) NR
- 2000 metres steeplechase – 5:56.79 (Zagreb 2023) NBP
- 3000 metres steeplechase – 9:09.64 (Zurich 2023) NR

Road

- 10 km – 33:43 (Tirana 2019)
- Half marathon – 1:11:17 (Luzern 2023)
- Marathon – 2:35:34 (Skopje 2020) NR

== Honour ==
- Albania: Grand Cross of the Order of Public Gratitude (2022)

== Notes ==
Olympic Games
Preceded by Erjon Tola	Flagbearer for Albania; Rio de Janeiro 2016	Succeeded by Suela Mehilli
Preceded by Suela Mehilli	Flagbearer for Albania; Tokyo 2020 with Briken Calja	Succeeded by Denni Xhepa
