= Romela Begaj =

Albanian weightlifter (born 1986)

Personal information
- Nationality: Albanian
- Born: 2 November 1986 (age 40) Tirana, Albania
- Height: 1.60 m (5 ft 3 in)
- Weight: 63 kg (139 lb)

Sport
- Country: Albania
- Sport: Weightlifting
- Event: 63kg
- Coached by: Gazmend Haksan

Achievements and titles
- World finals: 1
- Highest world ranking: 1
Medal record
Women's weightlifting
Representing Albania
World Championships
Disqualified	2017 Anaheim	–69 kg
European Championships
Silver medal – second place	2008 Lignano Sabbiadoro	–58 kg
Silver medal – second place	2010 Minsk	–58 kg
Silver medal – second place	2012 Antalya	–58 kg
Bronze medal – third place	2009 Bucharest	–58 kg
Bronze medal – third place	2013 Tirana	–58 kg
Mediterranean Games
Gold medal – first place	2009 Pescara	–58 kg
Bronze medal – third place	2005 Almería	–58 kg

Romela Aleksandër Begaj (born 2 November 1986) is an Albanian weightlifter. On 11 November 2014 in Almaty she became world champion in the Snatch style for the category up to 63 kg. Previously Begaj represented Albania at the 2008 European Weightlifting Championships where she took home the silver medal. She also represented Albania at 2008 Olympic Games in China where she finished 6th in the under 58 kg category.

In the 2011 World Weightlifting Championships she got a bronze medal in snatch.

Begaj, 28, became the first Albanian woman to win a World Championship gold medal by lifting 113 kg in the snatch. However, Begaj failed an anti-doping test for this event, and her results were expunged.

In January 2019, International Weightlifting Federation banned her for eight years for the doping violation.

== 2008 Olympic Games in Beijing ==
Athlete	Event	Snatch		Clean & Jerk		Total	Rank
Athlete	Event	Result	Rank	Result	Rank	Total	Rank
Romela Begaj	-58 kg	98	4th	118	7th	216	6th

Olympic Games
Preceded by Erjon Tola	Flagbearer for Albania; 2012 London	Succeeded by Erjon Tola
