= Briken Calja =

Albanian weightlifter (born 1990)

Personal information
- Born: 19 February 1990 (age 36) Shtërmen, Albania
- Height: 1.70 m (5 ft 7 in)
- Weight: 69 kg (152 lb)
- Military career
- Allegiance: Albania
- Branch: Albanian Armed Forces
- Service years: 2022–
- Rank: Colonel

Sport
- Country: Albania
- Sport: Weightlifting
- Event: 69 kg
Medal record
Men's weightlifting
Representing Albania
World Championships
Silver medal – second place	2021 Tashkent	73 kg
European Championships
Gold medal – first place	2018 Bucharest	-69 kg
Silver medal – second place	2019 Batumi	-73 kg
Silver medal – second place	2021 Moscow	-73 kg
Silver medal – second place	2026 Batumi	-79 kg
Mediterranean Games
Gold medal – first place	2026 Taranto	75 kg S
Silver medal – second place	2009 Pescara	69 kg S
Disqualified	2013 Mersin	69 kg S
Disqualified	2013 Mersin	69 kg CJ
Bronze medal – third place	2026 Taranto	75 kg CJ

Briken Calja (born 19 February 1990, Shtërmen) is an Albanian weightlifter, Olympian, and European Champion competing in the 69 kg category until 2018 and 73 kg starting in 2018 after the International Weightlifting Federation reorganized the categories. He won the silver medal in the men's 73 kg event at the 2021 World Weightlifting Championships held in Tashkent, Uzbekistan.

== Career ==
Calja competed for Albania at the 2012 Summer Olympics, where he finished 9th in his weight class after lifting a total weight of 320 kg. In 2013 Calja was suspended for two years for using androsterone.

He competed at the 2016 Summer Olympics in 69kg division where he finished in 5th place after lifting 326 kg. In 2018 Calja became European champion in the 2018 European Weightlifting Championships in Bucharest.

== Major results ==
Year	Venue	Weight	Snatch (kg)				Clean & Jerk (kg)				Total	Rank
Year	Venue	Weight	1	2	3	Rank	1	2	3	Rank	Total	Rank
Representing Albania
Olympic Games
2012	London, United Kingdom	69 kg	143	~~146~~	~~146~~	8	173	174	177	6	320	6
2016	Rio de Janeiro, Brazil	69 kg	145	~~151~~	~~151~~	7	175	181	~~184~~	5	326	5
2020	Tokyo, Japan	73 kg	~~151~~	151	~~155~~	7	184	~~188~~	190	4	341	4
World Championships
2006	Santo Domingo, Dominican Republic	62 kg	110	~~115~~	116	24	140	~~145~~	~~145~~	29	256	28
2010	Antalya, Turkey	69 kg	135	140	~~145~~	13	167	~~172~~	~~173~~	14	307	11
2011	Paris, France	69 kg	~~140~~	140	~~145~~	15	~~170~~	~~170~~	172	19	312	15
2015	Houston, United States	69 kg	~~143~~	~~143~~	143	12	177	183	~~187~~	7	326	7
2017	Anaheim, United States	69 kg	142	~~145~~	~~146~~	4	175	~~180~~	~~180~~	5	317	4
2018	Ashgabat, Turkmenistan	73 kg	148	153	~~157~~	6	181	186	~~189~~	7	339	6
2019	Pattaya, Thailand	73 kg	151	156	—	3rd place, bronze medalist(s)	181	~~190~~	~~190~~	13	337	5
2021	Tashkent, Uzbekistan	73 kg	152	154	156	1st place, gold medalist(s)	182	186	~~190~~	2nd place, silver medalist(s)	342	2nd place, silver medalist(s)
2022	Bogotá, Colombia	73 kg	~~150~~	150	~~154~~	9	~~185~~	—	—	—	—	—
2023	Riyadh, Saudi Arabia	81 kg	~~150~~	150	~~154~~	10	182	187	~~191~~	7	337	8
2024	Manama, Bahrain	73 kg	~~152~~	~~152~~	153	4	~~183~~	~~183~~	~~183~~	—	—	—
2025	Førde, Norway	79 kg	147	~~151~~	~~151~~	15	175	181	~~183~~	14	328	14
European Championships
2008	Lignano Sabbiadoro, Italy	69 kg	125	130	135	10	~~160~~	~~160~~	160	14	295	13
2009	Bucharest, Romania	69 kg	~~130~~	133	~~137~~	9	157	~~163~~	—	13	290	10
2012	Antalya, Turkey	69 kg	140	145	~~146~~	4	170	~~175~~	~~177~~	8	315	6
2013	Tirana, Albania	69 kg	~~142~~	~~142~~	~~142~~	—	~~173~~	174	~~177~~	3rd place, bronze medalist(s)	—	—
2016	Førde, Norway	69 kg	142	145	~~147~~	3rd place, bronze medalist(s)	~~177~~	~~178~~	~~178~~	—	—	—
2017	Split, Croatia	69 kg	~~145~~	~~145~~	~~145~~	—	170	175	~~178~~	3rd place, bronze medalist(s)	—	—
2018	Bucharest, Romania	69 kg	141	143	146	1st place, gold medalist(s)	171	~~175~~	175	1st place, gold medalist(s)	321	1st place, gold medalist(s)
2019	(Georgia (country)) Batumi, Georgia	73 kg	152	156	~~160~~	1st place, gold medalist(s)	~~183~~	183	~~188~~	2nd place, silver medalist(s)	339	2nd place, silver medalist(s)
2021	Moscow, Russia	73 kg	152	~~157~~	~~157~~	3rd place, bronze medalist(s)	~~183~~	184	~~188~~	2nd place, silver medalist(s)	336	2nd place, silver medalist(s)
2022	Tirana, Albania	73 kg	~~151~~	~~151~~	~~151~~	—	—	—	—	—	—	—
2023	Yerevan, Armenia	73 kg	~~151~~	~~152~~	~~152~~	—	—	—	—	—	—	—
2024	Sofia, Bulgaria	73 kg	~~148~~	148	~~153~~	7	180	~~185~~	~~186~~	5	328	5
2026	(Georgia (country)) Batumi, Georgia	79 kg	153	~~157~~	~~157~~	4	~~185~~	185	187	1st place, gold medalist(s)	340	2nd place, silver medalist(s)

Olympic Games
Preceded by Suela Mehilli	Flagbearer for Albania; Tokyo 2020 with Luiza Gega	Succeeded by Denni Xhepa
