= Ymer Pampuri =

Albanian weightlifter (1944–2017)

- Ymer Pampuri after being crowned world champion

Personal information
- Nationality: Albania
- Born: 30 April 1944 Tirana, German-occupied Albania
- Died: 18 January 2017 (aged 72)

Sport
- Country: Albania
- Sport: Weightlifting
- Event: 60 kg
Medal record
Representing Albania
World Championships
Gold medal – first place	1972 Munich	–60 kg / Press

Ymer Pampuri (30 April 1944 – 18 January 2017) was an Albanian weightlifter who in the 1972 Summer Olympic Games became the first Albanian to break an Olympic record, the first Albanian to become a World Champion and the last World Champion in military press, since the discipline was never against allowed to be practiced internationally after 1972.

== Life and career ==
Pampuri was born in Tirana. When he was seven years old he joined the Tirana Circus as an acrobat. In 1972 he was chosen to represent Albania in the European Championship in Romania. He lifted 125 kg, the same weight as the champion, but ended up second only losing by his body mass. In the same year he participated in the 1972 Summer Olympics. In 1972, when Pampuri and his coach, Zydi Mazreku, declared before their departure that they were going to bring a medal from the Munich Olympics, many of the directors of the Albanian sports laughed. At the age of 27, on 29 August 1972, the 17 Nentori weightlifter broke the Olympic record established by Yoshinobu Miyake in the clean and press style by lifting 127.5 kg and became World Champion in that discipline.
