= Albanian National Olympic Committee =

National Olympic Committee

- Country: Albania
- Code: ALB
- Created: 1958
- Recognized: 1959
- Continental Association: EOC
- Headquarters: Tirana, Albania
- President: Fidel Ylli
- Secretary General: [[Stavri Bello]
- Website: nocalbania.org.al

The Albanian National Olympic Committee (Albanian: Komiteti Olimpik Kombëtar Shqiptara, KOKSH) (IOC Code: ALB) is a non-profit organisation and the legal authority of Albania's participation in the Olympic Games. As a member of the International Olympic Committee (IOC), it is responsible for the development and management of all Olympic-related activities in the country.

Members of the committee are 46 sports federations, which elect the Executive Council composed of the president and ten members.

It is based in the country's capital, Tirana.

== History ==
The National Olympic Committee of Albania (KOKSH) was founded in 1958 and a year later gained recognition by the International Olympic Committee.

From the year of its foundation until 1989 the committee was known by the name "The General Council Committee of Sportspersons of Albania" and included in its core all the sports federations in the country.

With the change of the political system in Albania, in 1990, the committee was restructured as an independent entity, separate from the newly formed Ministry of Culture, Youth and Sports. Four years later, in 1994, by government decrees No. 20 and No. 401, it was sanctioned as a non-state non-profit organisation whose functions were based on the Olympic Charter.

== Executive committee ==
The committee of the KOKSH is represented by:

- President: Fidel Ylli
- Vice President: Erlind Pëllumbi
- Members: Luiza Gega, Florend Kalivopulli, Enkelejda Caushi, Labo Capo, Endrit Hoxha, Izmir Smajlaj

== Member federations ==
The Albanian National Federations are the organizations that coordinate all aspects of their individual sports. They are responsible for training, competition and development of their sports. There are currently 24 Olympic Summer and two Winter Sport Federations and 20 Non-Olympic Sports Federations in Albania.

=== Olympic Sport federations ===
National Federation	Summer or Winter	Headquarters
Albanian Archery Federation	Summer	Tirana
Albanian Athletics Federation	Summer	Tirana
Albanian Badminton Federation	Summer	Korçë
Albanian Basketball Association	Summer	Tirana
Albanian Boxing Federation	Summer	Tirana
Albanian Canoe Federation	Summer	Tirana
Albanian Cycling Federation	Summer	Tirana
Albanian Equestrian Sports Federation	Summer	Tirana
Albanian Fencing Federation	Summer	Tirana
Albanian Football Association	Summer	Tirana
Albanian Golf Federation	Summer	Tirana
Albanian Gymnastics Federation	Summer	Tirana
Albanian Handball Federation	Summer	Elbasan
Albanian Judo Federation	Summer	Tirana
Albanian Karate Federation	Summer	Tirana
Albanian Mountaineering Federation	Winter	Tirana
Albanian Sailing Federation	Summer	Tirana
Albanian Shooting Sport Federation	Summer	Tirana
Albanian Skiing Federation	Winter	Tirana
Albanian Swimming Federation	Summer	Tirana
Albanian Table Tennis Association	Summer	Shkodër
Albanian Taekwondo Federation	Summer	Tirana
Albanian Tennis Federation	Summer	Tirana
Albanian Volleyball Federation	Summer	Tirana
Albanian Weightlifting Federation	Summer	Tirana
Albanian Wrestling Federation	Summer	Tirana

=== Non-Olympic Sport federations ===
National Federation	Headquarters
Albanian Air Sports Federation	Tirana
Albanian Federation of Radio Amateurs	Tirana
Automobile Club Albania	Tirana
Albanian Bodybuilding Federation	Tirana
Albanian Bowling Federation	Tirana
Albanian Bridge Association	Tirana
Albanian Chess Association	Tirana
Albanian Dance Sport Federation	Tirana
Albanian Federation Sport for All	Tirana
Albanian Hunting and Fishing Federation	Tirana
Albanian Kickboxing Federation	Tirana
Albanian Mixed Martial Arts Federation	Tirana
Albanian Motorcycle Federation	Tirana
Albanian Paralympic Committee	Tirana
Albanian Rafting Federation	Tirana
Albanian School Sport Federation	Tirana
Albanian Snooker Federation	Tirana
Special Olympics Albania	Tirana
Albanian Students Sports Association	Tirana
Albanian Underwater Federation	Tirana

== See also ==
- Albania at the Olympics
- National Olympic Committee
