= Albania at the 2025 World Aquatics Championships =

- Flag of Albania
- World Aquatics code: ALB
- National federation: Albanian Swimming Federation
- Website: fshn.org.al

in Singapore
- Competitors: 2 in 1 sport
- Medals: Gold 0 Silver 0 Bronze 0 Total 0

World Aquatics Championships appearances
- 2003; 2005; 2007; 2009; 2011; 2013; 2015; 2017; 2019; 2022; 2023; 2024; 2025

Albania is competing at the 2025 World Aquatics Championships in Singapore from 11 July to 3 August 2025.

== Competitors ==
The following is the list of competitors in the Championships.

Sport	Men	Women	Total
Swimming	1	1	2
Total	1	1	2

== Swimming ==
Men

Athlete	Event	Heat		Semifinal		Final	
Athlete	Event	Time	Rank	Time	Rank	Time	Rank
Gresi Koxhaku	50 m freestyle	23.47	60	Did not advance			
Gresi Koxhaku	50 m butterfly	24.84	53	Did not advance			

Women

Athlete	Event	Heat		Semifinal		Final	
Athlete	Event	Time	Rank	Time	Rank	Time	Rank
Stella Gjoka	50 m breaststroke	33.61	43	Did not advance			
Stella Gjoka	100 m breaststroke	1:15.07	52	Did not advance			
