= Swimming at the 2009 World Aquatics Championships – Men's 200 metre freestyle =

Men's 200 metre freestyle at the 2009 FINA World Championships
- Venue: Foro Italico
- Dates: 27 July 2009 (heats, semifinals); 28 July 2009 (final)
- Competitors: 147
- Winning time: 1:42.00 WR

Medalists
gold medal	Paul Biedermann	Germany
silver medal	Michael Phelps	United States
bronze medal	Danila Izotov	Russia

The heats for the men's 200 metre freestyle race at the 2009 World Championships took place on the morning of 27 July and the final took place in the evening session of 28 July at the Foro Italico in Rome, Italy.

== Records ==
Prior to this competition, the existing world and competition records were as follows:

World record	Michael Phelps (USA)	1:42.96	Beijing, China	12 August 2008
Championship record	Michael Phelps (USA)	1:43.86	Melbourne, Australia	27 March 2007

The following records were established during the competition:

Date	Round	Name	Nationality	Time	Record
27 July	Semifinal 2	Paul Biedermann	Germany	1:43.65	CR
28 July	Final	Paul Biedermann	Germany	1:42.00	WR

== Results ==
=== Heats ===
Rank	Name	Nationality	Time	Heat	Lane	Notes
1	Paul Biedermann	Germany	1:45.30	14	4	
2	Michael Phelps	United States	1:45.60	15	4	
3	Danila Izotov	Russia	1:45.86	14	3	NR
4	Jean Basson	South Africa	1:45.88	15	3	
5	Sebastiaan Verschuren	Netherlands	1:46.25	13	8	
6	Sho Uchida	Japan	1:46.30	14	6	NR
7	Nikita Lobintsev	Russia	1:46.32	13	3	
8	Park Tae-Hwan	South Korea	1:46.53	13	4	
9	Kenrick Monk	Australia	1:46.56	15	1	
10	Patrick Murphy	Australia	1:46.61	13	5	
11	Shaune Fraser	Cayman Islands	1:46.89	12	2	
12	Andrew Hunter	Great Britain	1:46.96	13	2	
13	Emiliano Brembilla	Italy	1:46.99	14	1	
14	Dominik Meichtry	Switzerland	1:47.10	14	5	
15	David Walters	United States	1:47.15	15	5	
16	Ross Davenport	Great Britain	1:47.21	15	6	
17	Shogo Hihara	Japan	1:47.25	13	7	
18	Nicolas Oliveira	Brazil	1:47.55	13	6	
19	Gianluca Maglia	Italy	1:47.64	14	7	
20	Dominik Koll	Austria	1:47.83	13	1	
21	Ahmed Mathlouthi	Tunisia	1:47.88	14	2	
22	Ryan Harrison	Ireland	1:47.94	11	3	NR
23	Blake Worsley	Canada	1:48.17	12	7	
24	Brett Fraser	Cayman Islands	1:48.18	7	0	
25	Péter Bernek	Hungary	1:48.24	12	8	
26	Colin Russell	Canada	1:48.25	15	7	
27	Andrew Mcmillan	New Zealand	1:48.30	15	9	
28	Daniele Tirabassi	Venezuela	1:48.51	10	2	NR
29	Gard Kvale	Norway	1:48.57	12	1	NR
30	Rodrigo Castro	Brazil	1:48.62	14	8	
31	Nimrod Shapira Bar-Or	Israel	1:48.63	15	8	
32	Jon Raahauge Rud	Denmark	1:48.69	12	9	
33	Konrad Czerniak	Poland	1:48.73	15	0	
34	Clemens Rapp	Germany	1:48.75	14	9	
35	Douglas Lennox-Silva	Puerto Rico	1:48.81	6	2	NR
36	David Brandl	Austria	1:48.89	12	3	
37	Andreas Zisimos	Greece	1:48.96	12	5	
38	David Karasek	Switzerland	1:48.97	11	6	
39	Pholien Systermans	Belgium	1:49.03	11	5	
40	Michael Jack	New Zealand	1:49.11	13	9	
41	Djordje Markovic	Serbia	1:49.21	12	6	
42	Romāns Miloslavskis	Latvia	1:49.34	12	4	
43	Jan Venter	South Africa	1:49.41	13	0	
44	Cesar Faria	Portugal	1:49.53	10	4	
45	Raphaël Stacchiotti	Luxembourg	1:49.61	11	2	NR
46	Květoslav Svoboda	Czech Republic	1:49.74	11	4	
47	Glenn Surgeloose	Belgium	1:50.03	12	0	
48	Crox Acuna	Venezuela	1:50.08	10	6	
48	Zoltan Povazsay	Hungary	1:50.08	14	0	
50	Bae Joonmo	South Korea	1:50.48	10	8	
51	Gal Nevo	Israel	1:50.52	9	8	
52	Martín Kutscher	Uruguay	1:50.69	11	9	
53	Kemal Arda Gurdal	Turkey	1:50.79	9	6	
53	Jorge Maia	Portugal	1:50.79	10	5	
55	Shi Tengfei	China	1:50.88	10	1	
56	Conor Leaney	Ireland	1:50.98	10	0	
57	Raúl Martínez Colomer	Puerto Rico	1:51.09	9	3	
58	Xin Tong	China	1:51.18	11	8	
59	Sebastian Jahnsen Madico	Peru	1:51.21	8	3	
60	Vladimir Sidorkin	Estonia	1:51.24	11	1	
61	Mario Montoya	Costa Rica	1:51.30	10	9	NR
62	Oleg Rabota	Kazakhstan	1:51.56	8	7	
63	Branden Whitehurst	(United States Virgin Islands) Virgin Islands	1:51.59	6	6	NR
64	Lukasz Giminski	Poland	1:51.62	11	0	
65	Aleksandar Nikolov	Bulgaria	1:51.77	9	5	
66	Taki M'rabet	Tunisia	1:51.88	9	2	
67	Virdhawal Khade	India	1:52.01	11	7	
68	Mateo de Angulo	Colombia	1:52.37	9	9	
69	Vadym Lepskyy	Ukraine	1:52.50	8	0	
70	Irakli Revishvili	Georgia	1:52.87	8	5	
71	Lim Wen Hao Joshua	Singapore	1:52.99	8	2	
72	Saeid Maleka Ashtiani	Iran	1:53.32	6	3	
73	Ensar Hajder	Bosnia and Herzegovina	1:53.62	7	1	
74	Mikael Koloyan	Armenia	1:53.76	7	5	NR
75	Artur Dilman	Kazakhstan	1:53.88	9	1	
76	Miguel Molina	Philippines	1:54.02	10	3	
77	Sebastian Arispe Silva	Peru	1:54.04	7	4	
78	Petr Romashkin	Uzbekistan	1:54.09	9	7	
79	Charles William Walker	Philippines	1:54.72	7	6	
80	Zane Jordan	Zambia	1:54.87	7	9	
81	Mohamed Farhoud	Egypt	1:55.03	9	4	
82	Emin Noshadi	Iran	1:55.52	5	6	
83	Berrada Morad	Morocco	1:55.69	8	1	
84	José Alberto Montoya	Costa Rica	1:55.77	6	7	
85	Chien Jui-Ting	Chinese Taipei	1:55.91	7	7	
86	Sobitjon Amilov	Uzbekistan	1:56.25	7	3	
87	Julio Galofre	Colombia	1:56.40	10	7	
88	Grant Beahan	Zimbabwe	1:56.52	7	2	
89	Mohammed Madouh	Kuwait	1:56.64	6	4	
90	Pan Kai-Wen	Chinese Taipei	1:56.77	9	0	
91	Gary Pineda	Guatemala	1:56.95	4	2	
92	Cheah Mingzhe Marcus	Singapore	1:57.01	8	6	
93	Endi Babi	Albania	1:57.15	6	0	NR
94	Bojan Jovanov	Macedonia	1:57.48	1	0	
95	Radhames Kalaf	Dominican Republic	1:57.51	6	8	
96	Loai Abdulwahid Tashkandi	Saudi Arabia	1:57.94	8	9	
97	Diego Castillo	Panama	1:58.03	5	8	
98	Jonathan Wong	Jamaica	1:58.27	4	1	
99	Ashwin Menon	India	1:58.62	5	7	
100	Oriol Cunat	Andorra	1:58.74	5	3	
101	Rashid Iunusov	Kyrgyzstan	1:58.86	8	8	
102	Marzouq Alsalem	Kuwait	1:59.37	6	5	
103	Allan Gabriel Gutierrez Castro	Honduras	1:59.57	5	4	
104	Neil Agius	Malta	1:59.61	4	3	
105	Ahmed Jebrel	Palestine	1:59.71	4	0	
106	Kareem Ennab	Jordan	1:59.80	4	4	
107	Christopher Duenas	Guam	1:59.88	6	9	
108	Vaughn Forsythe	Barbados	1:59.94	5	1	
109	Giorgi Mtvralashvili	Georgia	2:00.03	5	2	
110	Colin Bensadon	Gibraltar	2:00.19	5	0	
111	Sidni Hoxha	Albania	2:01.30	4	8	
112	Aleksandr Slepchenko	Kyrgyzstan	2:01.41	6	1	
113	Ignacio Ivan Quevedo Bubba	Bolivia	2:01.84	3	5	
114	Omar Núñez	Nicaragua	2:02.23	4	7	
115	Fernando Medrano	Nicaragua	2:02.45	3	4	
116	Armando Esteban Zayas Claure	Bolivia	2:02.87	4	9	
117	Edward Caruana Dingli	Malta	2:03.43	3	2	
118	Heimanu Sichan	French Polynesia	2:03.65	4	6	
119	Esau Simpson	Grenada	2:03.93	3	9	
120	Luis Andres Martorell Name	Honduras	2:04.06	3	7	
121	Jean Marie Froget	Mauritius	2:05.47	3	0	
122	Mathieu Marquet	Mauritius	2:06.44	3	1	
123	Douglas Miller	Fiji	2:06.47	3	8	
124	Paul Elaisa	Fiji	2:06.72	2	4	
125	Saeed Al Jesmi	United Arab Emirates	2:06.77	3	6	
126	Vincent Perry	French Polynesia	2:06.92	5	9	
127	Sergey Pevnev	Armenia	2:07.73	3	3	
128	Ahmed Majeed Ali Tayawi	Iraq	2:08.55	2	0	
129	Al Khaduri Musallam	Oman	2:09.44	5	5	
130	Shane Mangroo	Seychelles	2:09.87	2	6	
131	Sergey Krovyakov	Turkmenistan	2:11.39	2	7	
132	Henk Aloysius Lowe	Guyana	2:11.56	2	8	
133	Adam Viktora	Seychelles	2:12.13	2	1	
134	Cooper Graf	Northern Mariana Islands	2:12.17	2	3	
135	Shin Kimura	Northern Mariana Islands	2:13.02	2	2	
136	Jesse Nilon	Samoa	2:13.15	2	5	
137	Fahad Alqooz	Bahrain	2:17.04	1	3	
138	Ahmet Halliyev	Turkmenistan	2:17.22	1	4	
139	Inayath Hassan	Maldives	2:18.63	1	6	
140	Ali Mohamed Raaidh	Maldives	2:22.16	1	5	
141	Christopher Symonds	Ghana	2:32.84	1	2	
—	Alexander Dale Oen	Norway	DNS	1	7	
—	Aleksandar Jeremic	Macedonia	DNS	1	8	
—	Lin Kuan-Ting	Chinese Taipei	DNS	7	8	
—	Mads Glæsner	Denmark	DNS	15	2	
—	Obaid Al-Jasmi	United Arab Emirates	DQ	4	5	
—	Salvador Mallat Arcaya	Chile	DQ	8	4	

=== Semifinals ===
Rank	Name	Nationality	Time	Heat	Lane	Notes
1	Paul Biedermann	Germany	1:43.65	2	4	CR, ER
2	Danila Izotov	Russia	1:45.09	2	5	NR
3	Michael Phelps	United States	1:45.23	1	4	
4	Nikita Lobintsev	Russia	1:45.31	2	6	
5	Sho Uchida	Japan	1:45.45	1	3	NR
6	Sebastiaan Verschuren	Netherlands	1:45.69	2	3	
7	Kenrick Monk	Australia	1:45.77	2	2	
8	Jean Basson	South Africa	1:45.82	1	5	AF
9	Dominik Meichtry	Switzerland	1:46.13	1	1	
10	Shaune Fraser	Cayman Islands	1:46.44	2	7	
11	Ross Davenport	Great Britain	1:46.46	2	8	NR
12	David Walters	United States	1:46.61	1	1	
13	Park Tae-Hwan	South Korea	1:46.68	1	6	
14	Patrick Murphy	Australia	1:46.70	1	2	
15	Andrew Hunter	Great Britain	1:46.90	1	7	
16	Shogo Hihara	Japan	1:47.36	1	8	

=== Final ===
Rank	Name	Nationality	Time	Lane	Notes
1st place, gold medalist(s)	Paul Biedermann	Germany	1:42.00	4	WR
2nd place, silver medalist(s)	Michael Phelps	United States	1:43.22	3	
3rd place, bronze medalist(s)	Danila Izotov	Russia	1:43.90	5	NR
4	Sho Uchida	Japan	1:45.24	2	NR
5	Kenrick Monk	Australia	1:45.46	1	
6	Jean Basson	South Africa	1:45.67	8	AF
7	Sebastiaan Verschuren	Netherlands	1:46.05	7	
8	Nikita Lobintsev	Russia	1:46.33	6	
