= List of Albanian swimmers =

This is a list of Albanian swimmers.

== Male swimmers ==
- Frank Leskaj (born 1971)
- Kreshnik Gjata (born 1983)
- Sidni Hoxha (born 1992)
- Noel Borshi (born 1996)
- Klavio Meça (born 1996)
- Nikol Merizaj (born 1998)

== Female swimmers ==
- Diana Basho (born 2000)
- Rovena Marku (born 1987)
- Nikol Merizaj (born 1998)
- Katie Rock (born 2003)

== See also ==
- Albanian Swimming Federation
