= Swimming at the 2010 Commonwealth Games – Men's 4 × 100 metre freestyle relay =

The Men's 4 × 100 metre freestyle relay event at the 2010 Commonwealth Games took place on 4 October 2010, at the SPM Swimming Pool Complex.

Two heats were held, with both containing six countries. The heat in which a country competed in did not formally matter for advancement, as the countries with the top eight times from the entire field qualified for the finals.

== Records ==
Prior to this competition, the existing world and Commonwealth Games records were as follows.

World record	United States; Michael Phelps (47.51); Garrett Weber-Gale (47.02); Cullen Jones (47.65); Jason Lezak (46.06)	3:08.24	Beijing, China	11 August 2008
Commonwealth record				
Games record	South Africa; Roland Schoeman (48.65); Lyndon Ferns (48.43); Gerhard Zandberg (49.44); Ryk Neethling (48.45)	3:14.97	Melbourne, Australia	16 March 2006

The following new world and Commonwealth Games records were set during this competition.

Date	Event	Name	Nationality	Time	GR	WR
4 October	Final	Kyle Richardson; Eamon Sullivan; Tommaso D'Orsogna; James Magnussen	Australia	3:13.92	GR	

== Results ==
=== Heats ===
Rank	Heat	Lane	Nation	Swimmers	Time	Notes
1	2	4	Australia	Kyle Richardson (49.56); Tommaso D'Orsogna (49.09); James Magnussen (48.24); Cameron Prosser (48.29)	3:15.18	Q
2	2	5	England	Adam Brown (49.72); Simon Burnett (49.23); Ross Davenport (48.84); Grant Turner (49.81)	3:17.60	Q
3	2	7	South Africa	Graeme Moore (49.90); Gideon Louw (49.93); Chad le Clos (50.15); Darian Townsend (48.96)	3:18.94	Q
4	1	4	Canada	Tobias Oriwol (50.88); Blake Worsley (50.22); Brian Johns (50.21); Richard Hortness (50.69)	3:22.01	Q
5	2	2	Scotland	Andrew Hunter (50.47); Jak Scott (50.28); Craig McNally (52.49); Cameron Brodie (52.90)	3:26.14	Q
6	2	3	India	Aaron D'Souza (51.80); Arjun Jayaprakash (53.14); Anshul Kothari (52.41); Virdhawal Khade (50.71)	3:28.06	Q
7	2	6	Northern Ireland	Conor Leaney (52.45); Ryan Harrison (51.10); Micheal Dawson (54.13); Andrew Bree (50.94)	3:28.63	Q
8	1	2	Singapore	Arren Quek (52.59); Richard Chng (52.52); Aaron Yeo (53.31); Dzulhaili Kamal (52.60)	3:31.02	Q
9	1	7	Trinidad and Tobago	Caryle Blondell (52.41); Joshua McLeod (52.80); Christian-Paul Homer (54.24); Jarryd Gregorie (52.11)	3:31.56	
10	1	5	Guernsey	Ian Howell (54.45); Ian Hubert (53.56); Thomas Hollingsworth (53.84); Ben Lowndes (55.41)	3:37.26	
11	1	6	Papua New Guinea	Daniel Pryke (56.77); Adam Ampa'oi (1:04.68); Peter Pokawin (56.98); Ryan Pini (52.68)	3:51.11	
-	1	3	Malaysia	Foo Jian Beng; Soon Yeap; Leam Lee; Daniel Bego	-	DNS

=== Final ===
Rank	Lane	Nation	Swimmers	Time	Notes
1st place, gold medalist(s)	4	Australia	Kyle Richardson (49.23); Eamon Sullivan (47.49); Tommaso D'Orsogna (48.63); James Magnussen (48.57)	3:13.92	GR
2nd place, silver medalist(s)	5	England	Simon Burnett (48.82); Liam Tancock (48.14); Grant Turner (49.01); Adam Brown (49.08)	3:15.05	
3rd place, bronze medalist(s)	3	South Africa	Graeme Moore (49.19); Gideon Louw (48.40); Roland Schoeman (49.09); Darian Townsend (48.53)	3:15.21	
4	6	Canada	Brent Hayden (48.18) CGR; Stefan Hirniak (49.84); Brian Johns (49.79); Blake Worsley (50.18)	3:17.99	
5	2	Scotland	Andrew Hunter (50.03); Jak Scott (50.23); David Carry (50.15); Robert Renwick (50.29)	3:20.70	
6	7	India	Aaron D'Souza (51.64); Arjun Jayaprakash (52.99); Anshul Kothari (52.64); Virdhawal Khade (49.87)	3:27.14	
7	1	Northern Ireland	Conor Leaney (52.31); Ryan Harrison (51.06); Micheal Dawson (54.08); Andrew Bree (50.47)	3:27.92	
8	8	Singapore	Arren Quek (52.88); Richard Chng (52.37); Aaron Yeo (53.10); Dzulhaili Kamal (52.36)	3:30.71	
