= Albania at the 2015 World Aquatics Championships =

- Flag of Albania
- FINA code: ALB
- National federation: Albanian Swimming Federation

in Kazan, Russia
- Competitors: 4 in 1 sport
- Medals: Gold 0 Silver 0 Bronze 0 Total 0

World Aquatics Championships appearances
- 2003; 2005; 2007; 2009; 2011; 2013; 2015; 2017; 2019; 2022; 2023; 2024

Albania competed at the 2015 World Aquatics Championships in Kazan, Russia from 24 July to 9 August 2015.

== Swimming ==
Albanian swimmers have achieved qualifying standards in the following events (up to a maximum of 2 swimmers in each event at the A-standard entry time, and 1 at the B-standard):

Men

Athlete	Event	Heat		Semifinal		Final	
Athlete	Event	Time	Rank	Time	Rank	Time	Rank
Sidni Hoxha	50 m freestyle	29.93	35	did not advance			
Sidni Hoxha	100 m freestyle	50.45	46	did not advance			
Klavio Meça	200 m freestyle	1:58.32	70	did not advance			
Klavio Meça	400 m freestyle	4:08.18	64	—		did not advance	

Women

Athlete	Event	Heat		Semifinal		Final	
Athlete	Event	Time	Rank	Time	Rank	Time	Rank
Noel Borshi	100 m butterfly	1:03.85	=49	did not advance			
Noel Borshi	200 m butterfly	2:20.28	38	did not advance			
Nikol Merizaj	100 m freestyle	1:02.19	80	did not advance			
Nikol Merizaj	200 m freestyle	2:14.58	58	did not advance			
