= Albania at the 2012 Summer Olympics =

- IOC code: ALB
- NOC: Albanian National Olympic Committee
- Website: nocalbania.org.al (in Albanian)

in London
- Competitors: 11 in 5 sports
- Flag bearer: Romela Begaj
- Medals: Gold 0 Silver 0 Bronze 0 Total 0

Summer Olympics appearances (overview)
- 1972; 1976–1988; 1992; 1996; 2000; 2004; 2008; 2012; 2016; 2020; 2024; 2028

Albania competed at the 2012 Summer Olympics in London, United Kingdom from 27 July to 12 August 2012. This was the nation's seventh appearance at the Olympics since its debut in 1972. The National Olympic Committee of Albania sent a total of 11 athletes to the Games, seven men and four women, to compete in four sports. Weightlifter Hysen Pulaku was officially removed from the team on the first day, after failing a drug test for the banned anabolic steroid substance, as announced by the International Olympic Committee.

The Albanians competed in five sports with the same number of athletes like they did at the 2008 Summer Olympics in Beijing in China.

In this edition, the team did not match its previous results, as it did not field Elis Guri and Sahit Prizreni.

Albania competed in Judo with World Judo Juniors Champion of 2009 and twice European Junior Champion of 2009 and 2010 Majlinda Kelmendi, who made her debut at the Olympic games. She competed at the Women's 52 kg event. In the first round she defeated Jaana Sundberg from Finland. Before losing in the round of 16 to Mauritian Judoka Legentil.

In Weightlifting Albania initially competed with four athletes, three male and one female. Briken Calja had the best result for Albania as he finished 6th in his debut for Albania lifting 320 kg in total. Romela Begaj competed for the second time for Albania but this time she wasn't able to improve on her result from the previous olympics as she finished 9th in the end.

== Athletics ==
Albania has qualified 1 female quota place, and selected 1 male athlete by wildcard.

Key

- Note–Ranks given for track events are within the athlete's heat only
- Q = Qualified for the next round
- q = Qualified for the next round as a fastest loser or, in field events, by position without achieving the qualifying target
- NR = National record
- N/A = Round not applicable for the event
- Bye = Athlete not required to compete in round

Track & road events

Athlete	Event	Heat		Semifinal		Final	
Athlete	Event	Result	Rank	Result	Rank	Result	Rank
Klodiana Shala	Women's 200 m	Withdrew due to injury					

Field events

Athlete	Event	Qualification		Final	
Athlete	Event	Distance	Position	Distance	Position
Adriatik Hoxha	Men's shot put	17.58	37	did not advance	

== Judo ==
Albania had not initially qualified a judoka, but due to the International Olympic Committee's refusal to allow Kosovars of Albanian ethnicity to represent Kosovo or to compete as independent athletes, Majlinda Kelmendi represented Albania at the 2012 Summer Olympics.

Athlete	Event	Round of 32	Round of 16	Quarterfinals	Semifinals	Repechage	Final / BM	
Athlete	Event	Opposition Result	Opposition Result	Opposition Result	Opposition Result	Opposition Result	Opposition Result	Rank
Majlinda Kelmendi	Women's −52 kg	Sundberg (FIN); W 0020–0001	Legentil (MRI); L 0101–1001	did not advance				

== Shooting ==
Athlete	Event	Qualification		Final	
Athlete	Event	Points	Rank	Points	Rank
Arben Kucana	Men's 10 m air pistol	577	20	did not advance	
Arben Kucana	Men's 50 m pistol	524	37	did not advance	

== Swimming ==
Albanian swimmers are invited. One male and one female.

Athlete	Event	Heat		Semifinal		Final	
Athlete	Event	Time	Rank	Time	Rank	Time	Rank
Sidni Hoxha	Men's 100 m freestyle	51.11 NR	37	did not advance			
Noel Borshi	Women's 100 m butterfly	1:05.49	40	did not advance			

== Weightlifting ==
Albania has qualified three male and one female quota places. On 28 July, the International Olympic Committee announced that Hysen Pulaku had tested positive for stanozolol, a banned anabolic steroid, and consequently ejected him from the games.

Athlete	Event	Snatch		Clean & Jerk		Total	Rank
Athlete	Event	Result	Rank	Result	Rank	Total	Rank
Briken Calja	Men's −69 kg	143	12	177	7	320	6
Daniel Godelli	Men's −69 kg	~~142~~	DNF	—	—	—	DNF
Endri Karina^{[a]}	Men's −94 kg	155	15	195	14	350	14
Romela Begaj	Women's −58 kg	101	7	115	12	216	9

== See also ==
- Albania at the 2010 European Aquatics Championships
- Albania at the 2011 World Aquatics Championships

== Notes ==
a.	The Albanian weightlifter, Erkand Qerimaj, resulted positive in the anti-doping test at the European Championship in Antalya, where he was found European Champion for 77 kg. He provisionally is suspended and replaced by Endri Karina.
