= Albania at the 1972 Summer Olympics =

- IOC code: ALB
- NOC: Albanian National Olympic Committee

in Munich
- Competitors: 5 (4 men and 1 woman) in 2 sports
- Flag bearer: Afërdita Tusha (Shooting)
- Medals: Gold 0 Silver 0 Bronze 0 Total 0

Summer Olympics appearances (overview)
- 1972; 1976–1988; 1992; 1996; 2000; 2004; 2008; 2012; 2016; 2020; 2024

Albania competed at the Summer Olympic Games for the first time at the 1972 Summer Olympics in Munich, West Germany. Five competitors, four men and one woman, took part in three events in two sports.

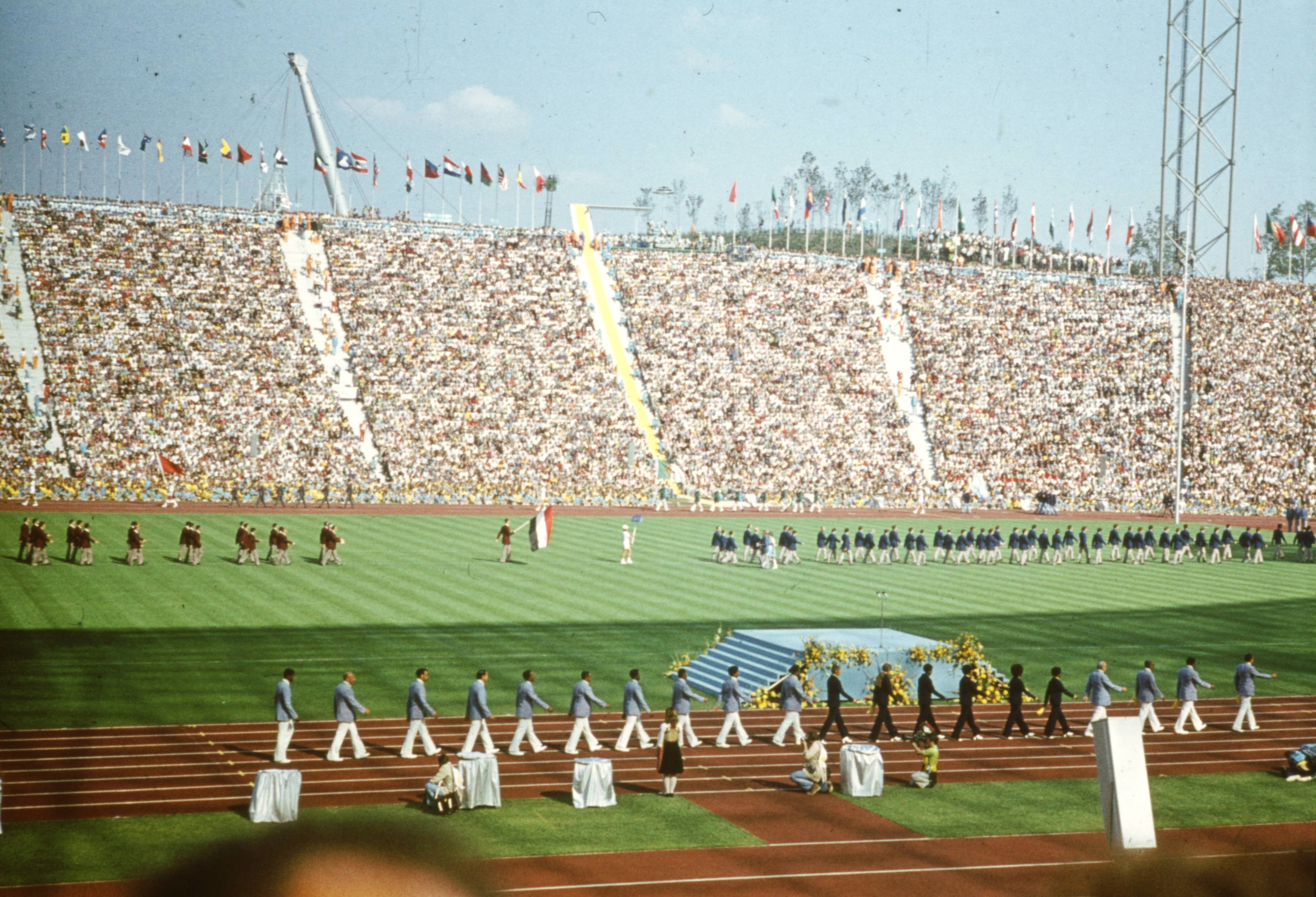
The Albanian team making its entry in the opening ceremony on the track at the far back

The flagbearer at the opening ceremony was Shooter Afërdita Tusha who competed for Albania in the 50 m free pistol together with fellow Albanian shooter Fatos Pilkati

She was also the first woman to represent Albania at the Olympics.

Fatos achieved the best result in his category finishing with 546 points in the 24th position, while Aferdita finished her first campaign below the top 50's with 522 points in total.

The other two shooter who represented Albania were Ismail Rama and Beqir Kosova in the 50 m rifle prone discipline. Ismail Rama had the best result for Albania in Shooting as he finished in rank 22 with an score of 594 in the end.

Albania made his debut in Weightlifting with Weightlifter Ymer Pampuri, in the Men's 60 kg Event. He became the first Albanian to break a World record as he lifted in the military press 127.5 kg. He finished this category in first place. Despite the good start he wasn't able to keep this form up as finished his next category only in 12th place. As he finished his Olympics in the 9th place. The best placement at this Summer Olympics for Albania.

== Shooting ==
Four shooters, three men and one woman, represented Albania in 1972.

Open

Athlete	Event	Final	
Athlete	Event	Score	Rank
Fatos Pilkati	50 m free pistol	546	24
Afërdita Tusha	50 m free pistol	522	51
Ismail Rama	50 m rifle prone	594	22
Beqir Kosova	50 m rifle prone	587	66

== Weightlifting ==
Men

Athlete	Event	Military press		Snatch		Clean & Jerk		Total	Rank
Athlete	Event	Result	Rank	Result	Rank	Result	Rank	Total	Rank
Ymer Pampuri	60 kg	127.5 OR	1	90.0	12	125.0	10	342.5	9
