= Swimming at the 2004 Commonwealth Youth Games =

Swimming at the II Commonwealth Youth Games
- Host city: Bendigo
- Date: 1-4 December
- Venue: Bendigo Aquatic Centre

At the 2004 Commonwealth Youth Games, the Swimming events were held at the Bendigo Aquatic Centre in Bendigo, Australia from 1 to 4 December. A near full programme of swimming events were held during the games.

== Results ==
=== Medal table ===
* Host nation ( AUS)

Rank	Nation	Gold	Silver	Bronze	Total
1	RSA	13	5	9	27
2	AUS*	9	17	8	34
3	NZL	9	6	6	21
4	SCO	7	10	13	30
5	SIN	1	1	2	4
6	JER	1	1	0	2
7	IND	0	0	1	1
Totals (7 entries)		40	40	39	119

=== Boys' events ===
Event	Gold		Silver		Bronze	
50 m freestyle	Corney Swanpoel; New Zealand	23.83	Justin Cottell; Australia	24.14	Leif Lyons; Australia	24.27
100 m freestyle	Justin Cottell; Australia	52.34	Nick Ffrost; Australia	52.91	Jean Basson; South Africa	52.98
200 m freestyle	Jean Basson; South Africa	1:51.73 GR	Nick Ffrost; Australia	1:52.90	Andrew Hunter; Scotland	1:53.80
400 m freestyle	Andrew Hunter; Scotland	3:57.63 GR	Jean Basson; South Africa	3:58.64	Robbie Renwick; Scotland	4:00.76
800 m freestyle	Mark Randall; South Africa	8:25.60 GR	Michael Papaioannou; Australia	8:30.93		
1500 m freestyle	Mark Randall; South Africa	15:15.15 GR	Nick Ffrost; Australia	16:02.64	Bryn Murphy; New Zealand	16:05.25
50 m backstroke	Ayrton Dickey; Australia	27.01 GR	Leif Lyons; Australia	27.58	Scott Houston; Scotland	28.06
100 m backstroke	Ayrton Dickey; Australia	58.05	Leif Lyons; Australia	58.27	John Zulch; New Zealand	59.73
200 m backstroke	Ayrton Dickey; Australia	2:05.68	Scott Houston; Scotland	2:07.83	Leif Lyons; Australia	2:09.32
50 m breaststroke	Glenn Snyders; New Zealand	29.67 GR	Kee Guan Benjami Ng; Singapore	30.63	Dono van der Merwe; South Africa	30.70
100 m breaststroke	Glenn Snyders; New Zealand	1:04.42 GR	Thabang Moeketsane; South Africa	1:05.03	Mark Branch; Scotland	1:06.07
200 m breaststroke	Mark Branch; Scotland	2:20.32	Thabang Moeketsane; South Africa	2:20.80	Glenn Snyders; New Zealand	2:21.41
50 m butterfly	Corney Swanpoel; New Zealand	24.66 GR	Matt Thomas; New Zealand	25.17	Dono van der Merwe; South Africa	25.69
100 m butterfly	Corney Swanpoel; New Zealand	53.90 GR	Matt Thomas; New Zealand	56.58	Garth Kates; Australia	56.69
200 m butterfly	Charles Mills; Scotland	2:05.27	Malcolm Kerr; Scotland	2:06.01	Arjun Muralidharan; India	2:06.99
200 m individual medley	Zhi Cong Lim; Singapore	2:09.36	Daniel Halksworth; Jersey	2:10.38	Glenn Snyders; New Zealand	2:10.69
400 m individual medley	Daniel Halksworth; Jersey	4:33.60	Lewis Smith; Scotland	4:36.91	Lionel Lee; Singapore	4:38.75
4×100 m freestyle relay	Australia; Australia; Leif Lyons; Nick Ffrost; Michael Papaioannou; Justin Cottell	3:31.31	New Zealand; New Zealand; Corney Swanpoel; Matt Thomas; Dean Burger; John Zulch	3:32.05	Scotland; Scotland; Robbie Renwick; Malcolm Kerr; Scott Houston; Andrew Hunter	3:36.56
4×200 m freestyle relay	Australia; Australia; Nick Ffrost; Leif Lyons; Michael Papaioannou; Justin Cottell	7:39.31	Scotland; Scotland; Scott Houston; Lewis Smith; Robbie Renwick; Andrew Hunter	7:48.42	New Zealand; New Zealand; Dean Burger; John Zulch; Bryn Murphy; Corney Swanpoel	7:50.00
4×100 m medley relay	New Zealand; New Zealand; John Zulch; Glenn Snyders; Corney Swanpoel; Dean Burger	3:49.86	Australia; Australia; Ayrton Dickey; Bryan Luca; Garth Kates; Justin Cottell	3:52.82	Scotland; Scotland; Scott Houston; Mark Branch; Malcolm Kerr; Andrew Hunter	3:55.07

=== Girls' events ===
Event	Gold		Silver		Bronze	
50 m freestyle	Lauren Roets; South Africa	26.66	Jenni Kilgallon; Scotland	26.74	Lize-Mari Retief; South Africa	27.39
100 m freestyle	Lauren Roets; South Africa	57.76	Jenni Kilgallon; Scotland	58.52	Lauren Winter; Australia	59.23
200 m freestyle	Meagen Nay; Australia	2:03.73	Kelly Boxwell; Australia	2:04.47	Melissa Corfe; South Africa	2:05.09
400 m freestyle	Melissa Corfe; South Africa	4:17.19 GR	Meagan Nay; Australia	4:18.15	Kelly Boxwell; Australia	4:19.52
800 m freestyle	Melissa Corfe; South Africa	8:51.85	Meagan Nay; Australia	8:55.21	Kelly Boxwell; Australia	8.56.26
1500 m freestyle	Melissa Corfe; South Africa	16:49.30 GR	Meagan Nay; Australia	16:57.68	Kelly Boxwell; Australia	16.58.27
50 m backstroke	Kelly Newcombe; New Zealand	30.74 GR	Lize-Mari Retief; South Africa	30.87	Gemma Sutherland; Scotland	30.92
100 m backstroke	Lorna Smith; Scotland	1:04.73	Kelly Newcombe; New Zealand	1:05.26	Gemma Sutherland; Scotland	1:05.48
200 m backstroke	Melissa Corfe; South Africa	2:15.56 GR	Lorna Smith; Scotland	2:18.56	Gemma Sutherland; Scotland	2:19.45
50 m breaststroke	Rebecca Hillis; Scotland	34.45 GR	Kelly Bently; New Zealand	34.52	Ruen Roanne Ho; Singapore	34.63
100 m breaststroke	Kerry Buchan; Scotland	1:11.85	Rebecca Hillis; Scotland	1:12.49	Suzaan van Biljon; South Africa	1:13.04
200 m breaststroke	Kelly Bently; New Zealand	2:34.90	Kerry Buchan; Scotland	2:35.14	Ronwyn Roper; South Africa	2:35.28
50 m butterfly	Lize-Mari Retief; South Africa	27.91 GR	Lauren Winter; Australia	28.05	Amy Smith; Australia	28.47
100 m butterfly	Lize-Mari Retief; South Africa	1:02.32 GR	Amy Smith; Australia	1:02.42	Chanelle van Wyk; South Africa	1:03.35
200 m butterfly	Amy Smith; Australia	2:15.48	Chanelle van Wyk; South Africa	2:16.94	Hannah Miley; Scotland	2:19.47
200 m individual medley	Lorna Smith; Scotland	2:20.76	Kristen Wilson; Australia	2:21.20	Gemma Sutherland; Scotland	2:21.61
400 m individual medley	Kristen Wilson; Australia	4:56.26 GR	Hannah Miley; Scotland	4:59:18	Kelly Bently; New Zealand	5:00.72
4×100 m freestyle relay	South Africa; South Africa; Christine Zweigers; Suzaan van Biljon; Melissa Corfe; Lauren Roets	3:55.96	Australia; Australia; Kelly Boxwell; Kristen Wilson; Megan Nay; Lauren Winter	3:58.48	Scotland; Scotland; Lorna Smith; Hannah Miley; Gemma Sutherland; Jenni Kilgallon	3:58.63
4×200 m freestyle relay	New Zealand; New Zealand; Shannon Clayton; Emma Hotchin; Ashley Wyllie; Verity Hicks	8:27.01	Australia; Australia; Kelly Boxwell; Kristen Wilson; Amy Smith; Meagan Nay	8:29.08	South Africa; South Africa; Melissa Corfe; Lauren Roets; Christine Zweigers; Suzaan van Biljon	8:39.76
4×100 m medley relay	South Africa; South Africa; Melissa Corfe; Ronwyn Roper; Lize-Mari Retief; Lauren Roets	4:18.92	New Zealand; New Zealand; Kelly Newcombe; Kelly Bently; Emma Banks; Verity Hicks	4:20.07	Scotland; Scotland; Lorna Smith; Kerry Buchanr; Louise Pate; Jenni Kilgannon	4:20.24
