= Albania at the 2016 Summer Olympics =

- IOC code: ALB
- NOC: Albanian National Olympic Committee
- Website: nocalbania.org.al (in Albanian)

in Rio de Janeiro
- Competitors: 6 in 3 sports
- Flag bearer: Luiza Gega
- Medals: Gold 0 Silver 0 Bronze 0 Total 0

Summer Olympics appearances (overview)
- 1972; 1976–1988; 1992; 1996; 2000; 2004; 2008; 2012; 2016; 2020; 2024; 2028

Albania competed at the 2016 Summer Olympics in Rio de Janeiro, Brazil, from 5 to 21 August 2016. This was the nation's eighth appearance at the Olympics after its debut in 1972. The National Olympic Committee of Albania sent a total of six athletes to the Games, three per gender, who competed in three sports (athletics, swimming, and weightlifting).

Notable athletes in the Albanian roster featured weightlifter and London 2012 Olympian Briken Calja, swimmer Sidni Hoxha, who competed at his third Olympics in the sprint freestyle, and middle-distance runner Luiza Gega, who was selected to carry the nation's flag in the opening ceremony.

== Athletics ==
Albanian athletes achieved qualifying standards in the following athletics events (up to a maximum of 3 athletes in each event):

Key

- Note–Ranks given for track events are within the athlete's heat only
- Q = Qualified for the next round
- q = Qualified for the next round as a fastest loser or, in field events, by position without achieving the qualifying target
- NR = National record
- N/A = Round not applicable for the event
- Bye = Athlete not required to compete in round
- NM = No mark

Track & road events

Athlete	Event	Heat		Final	
Athlete	Event	Result	Rank	Result	Rank
Luiza Gega	Women's 3000 m steeplechase	9:58.49	16	Did not advance	

Field events

Athlete	Event	Qualification		Final	
Athlete	Event	Distance	Position	Distance	Position
Izmir Smajlaj	Men's long jump	7.72	21	Did not advance	

== Swimming ==
Albania received a Universality invitation from FINA to send two swimmers (one male and one female) to the Olympics.

Athlete	Event	Heat		Semifinal		Final	
Athlete	Event	Time	Rank	Time	Rank	Time	Rank
Sidni Hoxha	Men's 50 m freestyle	22.80	41	Did not advance			
Nikol Merizaj	Women's 100 m freestyle	59.99	43	Did not advance			

== Weightlifting ==
Albania qualified one male weightlifter for the Olympics by virtue of his top 15 individual finish, among those who had not secured any quota places through the World or European Championships, in the IWF World Rankings as of 20 June 2016. The place was awarded to London 2012 Olympian Briken Calja in the men's lightweight division (69 kg).

Meanwhile, an unused women's Olympic spot was awarded to the Albanian team by IWF, as a result of Russia's complete ban from the Games due to the "multiple positive cases" of doping. This place was given to Evagjelia Veli.

Athlete	Event	Snatch		Clean & Jerk		Total	Rank
Athlete	Event	Result	Rank	Result	Rank	Total	Rank
Briken Calja	Men's −69 kg	145	5	181	5	326	5
Evagjelia Veli	Women's −53 kg	75	9	90	8	165	8
