= Swimming at the 2008 Summer Olympics – Men's 4 × 200 metre freestyle relay =

Men's 4 × 200 metre freestyle relay at the Games of the XXIX Olympiad
- Venue: Beijing National Aquatics Center
- Date: August 12, 2008 (heats); August 13, 2008 (final)
- Competitors: 73 from 16 nations
- Teams: 16
- Winning time: 6:58.56 WR

Medalists
| 1st place, gold medalist(s) | | Michael Phelps, Ryan Lochte, Ricky Berens, Peter Vanderkaay, David Walters*, Erik Vendt*, Klete Keller* | United States |
| 2nd place, silver medalist(s) | | Russia; Nikita Lobintsev, Yevgeny Lagunov, Danila Izotov, Alexander Sukhorukov, Mikhail Polishchuk* | Russia |
| 3rd place, bronze medalist(s) | | Patrick Murphy, Grant Hackett, Grant Brits, Nic Ffrost, Kirk Palmer*, Leith Brodie*; *Indicates the swimmer only competed in the preliminary heats. | Australia |

The men's 4 × 200 metre freestyle relay event at the 2008 Olympic Games took place on 12–13 August at the Beijing National Aquatics Center in Beijing, China.

The U.S. men's team smashed both the seven-minute barrier and the world record to keep Michael Phelps' gold-medal streak alive and most importantly, to defend their Olympic title in the event. The American foursome of Phelps (1:43.31, the second fastest split in history), Ryan Lochte (1:44.28), Ricky Berens (1:46.29), and Peter Vanderkaay (1:44.68) blistered the field, and prevailed in a sterling time of 6:58.56 to shave off their standard by almost five seconds from the 2007 World Championships in Melbourne. Earlier in the prelims, Berens (1:45.47) and his teammates David Walters (1:46.57), Erik Vendt (1:47.11), and Klete Keller (1:45.51) registered a top-seeded time of 7:04.66 from heat two to demolish Australia's 2000 Olympic record by 2.39 seconds.

Russia's Nikita Lobintsev (1:46.64), Yevgeny Lagunov (1:46.56), Danila Izotov (1:45.86), and Alexander Sukhorukov (1:44.65) trailed behind the Americans by over five body lengths to take home the silver in a European record of 7:03.70. Meanwhile, Australia's Patrick Murphy (1:45.95), Grant Hackett (1:45.87), Grant Brits (1:47.13), and Nic Ffrost (1:46.03) picked up a bronze in 7:04.98 to hold off the agile Italian quartet of Marco Belotti (1:47.37), Emiliano Brembilla (1:47.33), Massimiliano Rosolino (1:46.53), and Filippo Magnini (1:44.12) by 37-hundredths of a second, a national record of 7:05.35.

Canada's Brent Hayden (1:44.42) helped his teammates Colin Russell (1:46.89), Brian Johns (1:47.61), Brent Hayden (1:44.42), and Andrew Hurd (1:46.85) claim a fifth spot in a national record of 7:05.77. Great Britain (7:05.92), Japan (7:10.31), and South Africa (7:13.02), led by fourth-place finalist Jean Basson, rounded out the field.

== Records ==
Prior to this competition, the existing world and Olympic records were as follows.

| World record | United States (USA); Michael Phelps (1:45.36); Ryan Lochte (1:45.86); Klete Keller (1:46.31); Peter Vanderkaay (1:45.71) | 7:03.24 | Melbourne, Australia | 30 March 2007 | |
| Olympic record | Australia; Ian Thorpe (1:46.03); Michael Klim (1:46.40); Todd Pearson (1:47.36); Bill Kirby (1:47.26) | 7:07.05 | Sydney, Australia | 19 September 2000 | - |

The following new world and Olympic records were set during this competition.

| Date | Event | Name | Nationality | Time | Record |
|---|---|---|---|---|---|
| August 12 | Heat 2 | David Walters (1:46.57); Ricky Berens (1:45.47); Erik Vendt (1:47.11); Klete Keller (1:45.51) | United States | 7:04.66 | OR |
| August 13 | Final | Michael Phelps (1:43.31); Ryan Lochte (1:44.28); Ricky Berens (1:46.29); Peter Vanderkaay (1:44.68) | United States | 6:58.56 | WR |

== Results ==
=== Heats ===
| Rank | Heat | Lane | Nationality | Name | Time | Notes |
|---|---|---|---|---|---|---|
| 1 | 2 | 4 | United States | David Walters (1:46.57); Ricky Berens (1:45.47); Erik Vendt (1:47.11); Klete Keller (1:45.51) | 7:04.66 | Q, OR |
| 2 | 1 | 4 | Italy | Nicola Cassio (1:48.76); Marco Belotti (1:45.82); Emiliano Brembilla (1:46.46); Massimiliano Rosolino (1:46.80) | 7:07.84 | Q, EU |
| 3 | 1 | 6 | Russia | Mikhail Polishchuk (1:48.54); Danila Izotov (1:47.24); Nikita Lobintsev (1:46.84); Alexander Sukhorukov (1:45.24) | 7:07.86 | Q |
| 4 | 2 | 3 | Great Britain | David Carry (1:46.47) NR; Andrew Hunter (1:46.88); Ross Davenport (1:47.15); Robert Renwick (1:47.39) | 7:07.89 | Q, NR |
| 5 | 1 | 5 | Canada | Brian Johns (1:47.44); Rick Say (1:47.24); Adam Sioui (1:47.05); Andrew Hurd (1:46.31) | 7:08.04 | Q |
| 6 | 2 | 5 | Australia | Nic Ffrost (1:47.47); Grant Brits (1:46.84); Kirk Palmer (1:47.02); Leith Brodie (1:47.08) | 7:08.41 | Q |
| 7 | 1 | 7 | Japan | Yoshihiro Okumura (1:47.19); Sho Uchida (1:46.59); Yasunori Mononobe (1:47.29); Hisato Matsumoto (1:48.05) | 7:09.12 | Q, AS |
| 8 | 2 | 2 | South Africa | Jean Basson (1:45.99); Darian Townsend (1:46.14); Jan Venter (1:48.32); Sebastien Rousseau (1:50.46) | 7:10.91 | Q, AF |
| 9 | 2 | 6 | Austria | Dominik Koll (1:47.72) NR; David Brandl (1:46.45); Florian Janistyn (1:50.48); Markus Rogan (1:46.80) | 7:11.45 | |
| 10 | 1 | 2 | China | Zhang Lin (1:46.13); Zhang Enjian (1:49.31); Sun Yang (1:48.73); Shi Haoran (1:49.40) | 7:13.57 | |
| 10 | 1 | 8 | France | Clement Lefert (1:48.34); Sébastien Bodet (1:49.47); Matthieu Madelaine (1:49.87); Amaury Leveaux (1:45.89) | 7:13.57 | |
| 12 | 1 | 1 | Germany | Paul Biedermann (1:47.48); Benjamin Starke (1:48.51); Christian Kubusch (1:49.28); Stefan Herbst (1:48.65) | 7:13.92 | |
| 13 | 2 | 1 | Hungary | Gergő Kis (1:47.39); Tamás Kerékjártó (1:49.09); Dominik Kozma (1:49.26); Norbert Kovács (1:48.40) | 7:14.14 | |
| 14 | 2 | 7 | Poland | Łukasz Gąsior (1:49.43); Łukasz Wójt (1:48.54); Michał Rokicki (1:51.14); Przemysław Stańczyk (1:48.98) | 7:18.09 | |
| 15 | 2 | 8 | Greece | Andreas Zisimos (1:49.05); Nikos Xylouris (1:49.53); Ioannis Giannoulis (1:48.96); Vasileios Demetis (1:50.72) | 7:18.26 | |
| 16 | 1 | 3 | Brazil | Nicolas Oliveira (1:49.49); Rodrigo Castro (1:48.31); Phillip Morrison (1:49.35); Lucas Salatta (1:52.39) | 7:19.54 | |

=== Final ===
| Rank | Lane | Nationality | Name | Time | Time behind | Notes |
|---|---|---|---|---|---|---|
| 1st place, gold medalist(s) | 4 | United States | Michael Phelps (1:43.31); Ryan Lochte (1:44.28); Ricky Berens (1:46.29); Peter Vanderkaay (1:44.68) | 6:58.56 | | WR |
| 2nd place, silver medalist(s) | 3 | Russia | Nikita Lobintsev (1:46.64); Yevgeny Lagunov (1:46.56); Danila Izotov (1:45.85); Alexander Sukhorukov (1:44.65) | 7:03.70 | 5.14 | EU |
| 3rd place, bronze medalist(s) | 7 | Australia | Patrick Murphy (1:45.95); Grant Hackett (1:45.87); Grant Brits (1:47.13); Nic Ffrost (1:46.03) | 7:04.98 | 6.42 | |
| 4 | 5 | Italy | Marco Belotti (1:47.37); Emiliano Brembilla (1:47.33); Massimiliano Rosolino (1:46.53); Filippo Magnini (1:44.12) | 7:05.35 | 6.79 | NR |
| 5 | 2 | Canada | Colin Russell (1:46.89); Brian Johns (1:47.61); Brent Hayden (1:44.42); Andrew Hurd (1:46.85) | 7:05.77 | 7.21 | NR |
| 6 | 6 | Great Britain | David Carry (1:46.78); Andrew Hunter (1:46.73); Robbie Renwick (1:46.16); Ross Davenport (1:46.25) | 7:05.92 | 7.36 | NR |
| 7 | 1 | Japan | Yoshihiro Okumura (1:46.61); Sho Uchida (1:47.36); Yasunori Mononobe (1:47.72); Hisato Matsumoto (1:48.62) | 7:10.31 | 11.75 | |
| 8 | 8 | South Africa | Jean Basson (1:46.67); Darian Townsend (1:47.24); Jan Venter (1:49.56); Sebastien Rousseau (1:49.55) | 7:13.02 | 14.46 | |
