= List of Albanian records in swimming =

The Albanian records in swimming are the fastest ever performances of swimmers from Albania, which are recognised and ratified by the Albanian Swimming Federation (FSHN).

All records were set in finals unless noted otherwise.

== Long Course (50 m) ==
=== Men ===
| Event | Time | | Name | Club | Date | Meet | Location | Ref |
|---|---|---|---|---|---|---|---|---|
| 50 m freestyle | 22.80 | h | Sidni Hoxha | Albania | 11 August 2016 | Olympic Games | Rio de Janeiro, Brazil | |
| 100 m freestyle | 50.13 | h | Sidni Hoxha | TDS | 11 August 2013 | Greek Championships | Lamia, Greece | |
| 200 m freestyle | 1:53.73 | h | Kledi Kadiu | Albania | 21 August 2019 | World Junior Championships | Budapest, Hungary | |
| 400 m freestyle | 4:04.03 | h | Klavio Meça | Albania | 23 July 2017 | World Championships | Budapest, Hungary | |
| 800 m freestyle | 8:31.01 | | Franci Aleksi | La Mirada Armada | 4 April 2019 | Future Championships | Gresham, United States | |
| 1500 m freestyle | 16:13.91 | | Franci Aleksi | Albania | 30 March 2018 | Niobeia 2018 - Niovia | Thessaloniki, Greece | |
| 50m backstroke | 26.98 | h | Grisi Koxhaku | Tirana | 6 September 2023 (Note: by official result source; 5 September by FSHN source, a typo) | World Junior Championships | Netanya, Israel | |
| 100m backstroke | 57.64 | | Zhulian Lavdaniti | Zwemclub Schoten | 25 February 2022 | Vlaams Championships | Antwerp, Belgium | |
| 100m backstroke | 57.55 | h, # | Zhulian Lavdaniti | Zwemclub Schoten | 22 April 2023 | Belgian Open Championships | Antwerp, Belgium | |
| 200m backstroke | 2:06.77 | h | Zhulian Lavdaniti | Zwemclub Schoten | 23 January 2022 | Flanders Swimming Cup | Antwerp, Belgium | |
| 200m backstroke | 2:06.23 | h, # | Zhulian Lavdaniti | Zwemclub Schoten | 21 April 2023 | Belgian Open Championships | Antwerp, Belgium | |
| 50m breaststroke | 28.12 | | Kledi Kadiu | CSP Tideriders | 11 August 2021 | NCSA Summer Championships | Huntsville, United States | |
| 100m breaststroke | 1:03.00 | | Kledi Kadiu | CSP Tideriders | 10 August 2021 | NCSA Summer Championships | Huntsville, United States | |
| 200m breaststroke | 2:18.22 | | Kledi Kadiu | CSP Tideriders | 12 August 2021 | NCSA Summer Championships | Huntsville, United States | |
| 200m breaststroke | 2:17.43 | not ratified | Gabriel Brushtulli | Albania | 3 August 2019 | Italian Championships | Rome, Italy | |
| 50m butterfly | 24.56 | | Sidni Hoxha | TDS | 10 August 2013 | Greek Championships | Lamia, Greece | |
| 100m butterfly | 56.18 (Note: by official result source; 56.16 by FSHN source, a typo) | h | Grisi Koxhaku | Albania | 19 June 2024 | European Championships | Belgrade, Serbia | |
| 200m butterfly | 2:04.35 | | Endi Babi | Etobicoke Swim Club | 10 July 2009 | Canadian Championships | Montreal, Canada | |
| 200m individual medley | 2:12.02 | | Gabriel Brushtulli | Albania | July 2018 | - | Ljubljana, Slovenia | |
| 200m individual medley | 2:08.70 | not ratified | Zhulian Lavdaniti | Albania | 31 July 2021 | Zomercriterium/Critterium D' Ete | Antwerp, Belgium | |
| 200m individual medley | 2:06.99 | '#' | Zhulian Lavdaniti | Zwemclub Schoten | 22 April 2023 | Belgian Open Championships | Antwerp, Belgium | |
| 400m individual medley | 4:46.33 | | Edvin Angjeli | - | 2010 | | | |
| 400m individual medley | 4:43.73 | not ratified | Besjon Rexha | Etobicoke Swim Club | 27 July 2018 | Canadian Junior Championships | Winnipeg, Canada | |
| 4×50m freestyle relay (club) | 1:51.70 | | | Butrinti | | | | |
| 4×100m freestyle relay | 3:37.80 (Note: by official result source; 3:37.30 by FSHN source, a typo) | h | Zhulian Lavdaniti (53.04); Paolo Priska (52.48); Grisi Koxhaku (53.58); Even Qarri (58.70) | Albania | 20 June 2024 | European Championships | Belgrade, Serbia | |
| 4×200m freestyle relay (club) | 8:20.03 | | Koxhaku; Kapoli; Selimi; Lula | Tirana | 30 August 2025 | - | Durrës, Albania | |
| 4×50m medley relay | 2:05.60 | | | | | | | |
| 4×100m medley relay (club) | 3:47.37 | | | Teuta | September 2019 | - | Albania | |

Legend: # – Record awaiting ratification by Albanian Swimming Federation; WR – World record; ER – European record; e – equalled existing record;
Records not set in finals: h – heat; sf – semifinal; r – relay 1st leg; rh – relay heat 1st leg; b – B final; † – en route to final mark; so – swim-off; tt – time trial

=== Women ===
| Event | Time | | Name | Club | Date | Meet | Location | Ref |
|---|---|---|---|---|---|---|---|---|
| 50m freestyle | 26.06 | h, † | Nikol Merizaj | Albania | 13 May 2022 | Akropolis Open | Athens, Greece | |
| 50m freestyle | 25.56 | '#' | Nikol Merizaj | Noalex | 14 February 2025 | Northern Greece Winter Championships | Thessaloniki, Greece | |
| 100m freestyle | 57.75 | h | Nikol Merizaj | Albania | 2 April 2021 | Bulgarian Open Team Championships | Sofia, Bulgaria | |
| 100m freestyle | 56.45 | '#' | Nikol Merizaj | Noalex | 12 April 2025 | Niobia Meet | Thessaloniki, Greece | |
| 100m freestyle | 56.21 | '#' | Nikol Merizaj | Noalex | 19 May 2025 | Greek Championships | Thessaloniki, Greece | |
| 200m freestyle | 2:08.14 | | Nikol Merizaj | Albania | 15 February 2020 | Open Winter Games | Athens, Greece | |
| 400m freestyle | 4:28.81 | | Noel Borshi | Albania | July 2014 | - | Rome, Italy | |
| 800m freestyle | 9:15.91 | | Noel Borshi | Albania | 24 June 2011 | - | Rome, Italy | |
| 1500m freestyle | 18:11.55 | | Kaltra Mece | Akademia e Notit Stela | 18 June 2021 | Teuta Cup | Durrës, Albania | |
| 50m backstroke | 32.73 | | Ledia Allaraj | Partizan | 15 May 2016 | - | Dubrovnik, Croatia | |
| 50m backstroke | 31.99 | not ratified | Noel Borshi | S.S.D. Vita | 20 July 2017 | - | Rome, Italy | |
| 100m backstroke | 1:06.95 | | Luna Djarmati | Albania | 21 June 2026 | Comen Cup – Mediterranean Cup | Futog, Serbia | |
| 200m backstroke | 2:25.44 | | Noel Borshi | S.S.D. Vita | 9 July 2017 | - | Rome, Italy | |
| 50m breaststroke | 33.70 | h | Stella Gjoka | Albania | 22 June 2024 | European Championships | Belgrade, Serbia | |
| 50m breaststroke | 33.61 | h, # | Stella Gjoka | Albania | 2 August 2025 | World Championships | Singapore, Singapore | |
| 50m breaststroke | 33.28 | h, # | Stella Gjoka | Albania | 15 August 2026 | European Championships | Paris, France | |
| 100m breaststroke | 1:15.00 | h | Stella Gjoka | Albania | 18 June 2024 | European Championships | Belgrade, Serbia | |
| 200m breaststroke | 2:49.91 | | Vivian Xhemollari | Stela | 16 July 2021 | National Junior Championships | Tirana, Albania | |
| 50m butterfly | 27.70 | h | Nikol Merizaj | Albania | 13 May 2022 | Akropolis Open | Athens, Greece | |
| 50m butterfly | 27.18 | '#' | Nikol Merizaj | Noalex | 16 February 2025 | Northern Greece Winter Championships | Thessaloniki, Greece | |
| 100m butterfly | 1:03.21 | | Nikol Merizaj | Albania | 28 May 2021 | Akropolis Grand Prix | Athens, Greece | |
| 100m butterfly | 1:01.31 | '#' | Nikol Merizaj | Noalex | 14 February 2025 | Northern Greece Winter Championships | Thessaloniki, Greece | |
| 200m butterfly | 2:19.86 | | Noel Borshi | Albania | 14 April 2015 | - | Riccione, Italy | |
| 200m individual medley | 2:29.14 | | Vivian Xhemollari | Tirana | August 2022 | - | Rome, Italy | |
| 400m individual medley | 5:09.63 | | Vivian Xhemollari | Stela | June 2023 | - | Tirana, Albania | |
| 4×100m freestyle relay | 4:25.47 | | | Stela | July 2021 | Albanian Championship | Tirana, Albania | |
| 4×200m freestyle relay | 9:32.87 | | | Stela | July 2022 | Albanian Championship | Tirana, Albania | |
| 4×100m medley relay | 5:03.51 | | | Stela | July 2021 | Albanian Championships | Tirana, Albania | |
| 4×100m medley relay | 4:57.09 | not ratified | Aurora Hoxha; Patricia Cani; Noel Borshi (1:07.40); Anxhela Kashari (1:04.16) | Albania | 1 May 2011 | Junior Balkan Championship | Banja Luka, Bosnia and Herzegovina | |

Legend: # – Record awaiting ratification by Albanian Swimming Federation; WR – World record; ER – European record; e – equalled existing record;
Records not set in finals: h – heat; sf – semifinal; r – relay 1st leg; rh – relay heat 1st leg; b – B final; † – en route to final mark; so – swim-off; tt – time trial

== Short Course (25 m) ==
=== Men ===
| Event | Time | | Name | Club | Date | Meet | Location | Ref |
|---|---|---|---|---|---|---|---|---|
| 50m freestyle | 22.05 | h | Sidni Hoxha | Albania | 4 December 2015 | European Championships | Netanya, Israel | |
| 100m freestyle | 48.99 | h | Sidni Hoxha | Albania | 5 December 2015 | European Championships | Netanya, Israel | |
| 200m freestyle | 1:51.71 | | Mark Ducaj | Stela | 27 March 2022 | Delfin Cup | Skopje, North Macedonia | |
| 200m freestyle | 1:51.60 | '#' | Reidi Resuli | ASD Strasport | 2 March 2025 | Campionato Regionale Lombardo | Monza, Italy | |
| 200m freestyle | 1:51.66 | b, not ratified | Kristi Grillo | Ramac | 15 December 2017 | Ontario Junior International | Toronto, Canada | |
| 400m freestyle | 3:56.09 | | Mark Ducaj | Stela | November 2022 | Albanian Championships | Tirana, Albania | |
| 800m freestyle | 8:11.89 | | Mark Ducaj | Stela | 27 March 2022 | Delfin Cup | Skopje, North Macedonia | |
| 1500m freestyle | 15:49.53 | | Franc Aleksi | Eagles | 2018 | - | | |
| 50m backstroke | 25.45 | rh | Gresi Koxhaku | Albania | 6 December 2023 | European Championships | Otopeni, Romania | |
| 100m backstroke | 56.02 | h | Gresi Koxhaku | Albania | 7 December 2023 | European Championships | Otopeni, Romania | |
| 200m backstroke | 2:09.91 | | Elio Veli | Stela | February 2019 | Mimosa Cup | Bosnia and Herzegovina | |
| 200m backstroke | 2:04.88 | h, not ratified | Zhulian Lavdaniti | Albania | 14 November 2021 | Belgium Championships | Leuven, Belgium | |
| 50m breaststroke | 29.11 | | Toni Groshi | Tirana Delfina Sport | 4 March 2023 | Neptun Cup | Skopje, North Macedonia | |
| 100m breaststroke | 1:01.34 | h | Kledi Kadiu | Albania | 16 December 2021 (Note: by official result source; 20 December 2021 by federation source, a typo) | World Championships | Abu Dhabi, United Arab Emirates | |
| 200m breaststroke | 2:20.72 | | Deni Baholli | Albania | 18 February 2017 | Mimoza Cup | Herceg Novi, Montenegro | |
| 50m butterfly | 23.86 | h | Gresi Koxhaku | Albania | 10 December 2024 | World Championships | Budapest, Hungary | |
| 100m butterfly | 54.80 | h | Gresi Koxhaku | Albania | 5 December 2023 | European Championships | Otopeni, Romania | |
| 200m butterfly | 2:06.37 | | Flavio Matacchiera | Albania | 26 March 2018 | - | Riccione, Italy | |
| 200m butterfly | 2:01.92 | not ratified | Endi Babi | Etobicoke | 18 February 2006 | Eastern Canadian Championships | Montreal, Canada | |
| 100m individual medley | 56.84 | h | Zhulian Lavdaniti | Albania | 6 November 2021 | European Championships | Kazan, Russia | |
| 200m individual medley | 2:05.08 | h | Zhulian Lavdaniti | Albania | 4 November 2021 | European Championships | Kazan, Russia | |
| 200m individual medley | 2:04.06 | not ratified | Zhulian Lavdaniti | Albania | 24 July 2021 | Zomercriterium | Antwerp, Belgium | |
| 400m individual medley | 4:35.22 (Note: by official result source; 4:35.82 by federation source, a typo) | h | Edvin Angjeli | Albania | 16 December 2010 | World Championships | Dubai, United Arab Emirates | |
| 400m individual medley | 4:31.15 | not ratified | Besjon Rexha | Etobicoke | 1 December 2017 | Youth Cup | Toronto, Canada | |
| 4×50m freestyle relay | 1:38.09 | | | Stela | November 2022 | Albanian Championships | Tirana, Albania | |
| 4×100m freestyle relay | 3:37.00 | | | Stela | November 2022 | Albanian Championships | Tirana, Albania | |
| 4×200m freestyle relay | 8:00.03 | | | Stela | November 2022 | Albanian Championships | Tirana, Albania | |
| 4×50m medley relay | 1:55.05 | | | - | 23 April 2017 | | | |
| 4×100m medley relay | 4:06.95 | h | Kennet Libohova (1:01.64); Deni Baholli (1:06.84); Franci Aleksi (1:01.93); Frenc Berdaku (56.54) | Albania | 11 December 2016 | World Championships | Windsor, Canada | |

Legend: # – Record awaiting ratification by Albanian Swimming Federation; WR – World record; ER – European record; e – equalled existing record;
Records not set in finals: h – heat; sf – semifinal; r – relay 1st leg; rh – relay heat 1st leg; b – B final; † – en route to final mark; so – swim-off; tt – time trial

=== Women ===
| Event | Time | | Name | Club | Date | Meet | Location | Ref |
|---|---|---|---|---|---|---|---|---|
| 50m freestyle | 25.40 | h | Nikol Merizaj | Albania | 20 December 2021 | World Championships | Abu Dhabi, United Arab Emirates | |
| 100m freestyle | 58.20 | | Nikol Merizaj | Albania | 21/22 April 2018 | Albanian Championships | Tirana, Albania | |
| 200m freestyle | 2:05.37 | | Noel Borshi | Albania | 9 March 2014 | - | Rome, Italy | |
| 400m freestyle | 4:22.58 | | Noel Borshi | Albania | 9 March 2014 | - | Rome, Italy | |
| 800m freestyle | 9:03.84 | | Noel Borshi | Albania | 12 February 2012 | - | Riccione, Italy | |
| 1500m freestyle | 17:40.30 | | Vivian Xhemollari | Stela | 21/22 November 2020 | Nemo Cup | Shkup, Albania | |
| 50m backstroke | 31.38 | | Kaltra Meca | Tirana | 23/24 November 2024 | Pavaresia Cup | Tirana, Albania | |
| 100m backstroke | 1:05.82 | | Kaltra Meca | Tirana | 23/24 November 2024 | Pavaresia Cup | Tirana, Albania | |
| 200m backstroke | 2:18.66 | | Vivian Xhemollari | Tirana | 11/12 November 2023 | Skopje Open | Skopje, North Macedonia | |
| 50m breaststroke | 33.09 | | Stella Gjoka | Teuta | 13/14 April 2024 | Albanian Championships | Tirana, Albania | |
| 50m breaststroke | 32.40 | h, # | Stella Gjoka | Albania | 6 December 2025 | European Championships | Lublin, Poland | |
| 100m breaststroke | 1:15.00 | | Stella Gjoka | Teuta | 13/14 April 2024 | Albanian Championships | Tirana, Albania | |
| 200m breaststroke | 2:43.53 | | Telma Hashorva | Stela | 14/15 November 2020 | - | Skopje, North Macedonia | |
| 50m butterfly | 27.03 | h | Nikol Merizaj | Albania | 18 December 2021 | World Championships | Abu Dhabi, United Arab Emirates | |
| 100m butterfly | 1:03.33 | | Noel Borshi | Albania | 23 February 2014 | - | Rome, Italy | |
| 200m butterfly | 2:16.61 | | Noel Borshi | Albania | 1 March 2015 | - | Rome, Italy | |
| 100m individual medley | 1:04.46 | | Nikol Merizaj | - | 16/17 October 2021 | - | Thessaloniki, Greece | |
| 200m individual medley | 2:22.26 | | Vivian Xhemollari | Tirana | March 2023 | Delfin Cup | Skopje, North Macedonia | |
| 400m individual medley | 4:58.59 | | Vivian Xhemollari | Tirana | March 2023 | Delfin Cup | Skopje, North Macedonia | |
| 4×50m freestyle relay | 1:50.11 | h | Arla Dermishi (26.94); Stella Gjoka (26.98); Kejsi Hoti (28.11); Luna Djarmati (28.08) | Albania | 2 December 2025 | European Championships | Lublin, Poland | |
| 4×100m freestyle relay | 4:33.04 | | | April 2017 | Albanian Championships | Tirana, Albania | | |
| 4×200m freestyle relay | 9:53.91 | | | Stela | April 2019 | Albanian Championships | Tirana, Albania | |
| 4×50m medley relay | 2:17.58 | | | Stela | April 2019 | Albanian Championships | Tirana, Albania | |
| 4×100m medley relay | 5:01.37 | | | Eagles | 21/22 April 2018 | Albanian Championships | Tirana, Albania | |

Legend: # – Record awaiting ratification by Albanian Swimming Federation; WR – World record; ER – European record; e – equalled existing record;
Records not set in finals: h – heat; sf – semifinal; r – relay 1st leg; rh – relay heat 1st leg; b – B final; † – en route to final mark; so – swim-off; tt – time trial

=== Mixed relay ===
| Event | Time | | Name | Club | Date | Meet | Location | Ref |
|---|---|---|---|---|---|---|---|---|
| 4×50 m freestyle relay | 1:44.23 | h, # | Gresi Koxhaku (22.79); Edlijano Huna (25.59); Luna Djarmati (28.01); Kejsi Hoti (27.84) | Albania | 4 December 2025 | European Championships | Lublin, Poland | |
| 4×50 m medley relay | 1:50.09 | h, # | Klint Hoxha (26.74); Stella Gjoka (32.42); Gresi Koxhaku (24.38); Arla Dermishi (26.55) | Albania | 3 December 2025 | European Championships | Lublin, Poland | |
| 4×100m medley relay | 4:01.60 | | | Stela | November 2022 | Albanian Championships | Tirana, Albania | |

Legend: # – Record awaiting ratification by Albanian Swimming Federation; e – equalled existing record;
Records not set in finals: h – heat; so – swim-off
