= Albania at the 2020 Summer Olympics =

- IOC code: ALB
- NOC: Albanian National Olympic Committee
- Website: nocalbania.org.al (in Albanian)

in Tokyo, Japan July 23, 2021 – August 8, 2021
- Competitors: 9 (6 men and 3 women) in 6 sports
- Flag bearers (opening): Luiza Gega; Briken Calja
- Flag bearer (closing): N/A
- Medals: Gold 0 Silver 0 Bronze 0 Total 0

Summer Olympics appearances (overview)
- 1972; 1976–1988; 1992; 1996; 2000; 2004; 2008; 2012; 2016; 2020; 2024; 2028

Albania (ALB) competed at the 2020 Summer Olympics in Tokyo, Japan, represented by the Albanian National Olympic Committee (KOKSH). Originally scheduled to take place from 24 July to 9 August 2020, the Games were postponed to 23 July to 8 August 2021, because of the COVID-19 pandemic.

Up to this point, the nation had participated in the Summer Olympic Games on eight occasions since its first appearance in 1972. A total of nine athletes, six men and three women, were selected by the national committee to compete in six sports.

Four athletes qualified based on their results, including track star Luiza Gega, who won Gold at the 2018 Mediterranean Games in the 3000m steeplechase run. It was her second participation at the Summer Olympics.

In weightlifting, Albania competed with two men. Briken Calja, the European Weightlifting Champion from 2018, competed in the Men's 73 kg category, while Erkand Qerimaj competed in the Men's 81 kg competition. The best result was achieved by Briken Calja, who finished 4th after lifting 342 kg. This marks Albania's highest finishing position at an event in their history at the Summer Olympics.

Another notable achievement came from Luiza Gega, who qualified for the Finals in Athletics, being the first athlete to do so. In the end, she finished the finals in 13th, with a time of 9:34.10.

Despite significant improvements from previous Olympics, Albania did not win any medals.

== Background ==
Prior to the 2020 games, Albania had sent a delegation to eight Summer Olympic Games. The Albanian National Olympic Committee (KOKSH) was recognized by the International Olympic Committee (IOC) on 1 January 1959. The nation made its debut appearance at the 1972 Summer Olympics in Munich, Germany, and missed the following editions, before returning for the 1992 Summer Olympics in Barcelona, Spain.

== Competitors ==
The following table lists the number of competitors for Albania in the 2020 Summer Olympics. The nation's team for the 2020 games was composed of six male and three female competitors, including athletes Izmir Smajlaj and Luiza Gega, gymnast Matvei Petrov, judoka Indrit Cullahj, shooter Manuela Delilaj, swimmers Kledi Kadiu and Nikol Merizaj as well as weightlifters Briken Calja and Erkand Qerimaj.

Sport	Men	Women	Total
Athletics	1	1	2
Gymnastics	1	0	1
Judo	1	0	1
Shooting	0	1	1
Swimming	1	1	2
Weightlifting	2	0	2
Total	6	3	9

== Athletics ==
Albanian athletes further achieved the entry standards, by world ranking (one female) or by Universality place (one man), in the following track and field events (up to a maximum of 3 athletes in each event):

Key

- Note–Ranks given for track events are within the athlete's heat only
- Q = Qualified for the next round
- q = Qualified for the next round as a fastest loser or, in field events, by position without achieving the qualifying target
- NR = National record
- N/A = Round not applicable for the event
- Bye = Athlete not required to compete in round

Track & road events

Athlete	Event	Heat		Final	
Athlete	Event	Result	Rank	Result	Rank
Luiza Gega	Women's 3000 m steeplechase	9:23.85 SB	5 q	9:34.10	13

Field events

Athlete	Event	Qualification		Final	
Athlete	Event	Distance	Position	Distance	Position
Izmir Smajlaj	Men's long jump	7.86	17	Did not advance	

== Gymnastics ==
=== Artistic ===
Albania received an invitation from the Tripartite Commission to send a male gymnast to the Games, marking the country's debut in the sport. Matvei Petrov entered the men's pommel horse and finished tenth in the qualification round, failing to qualify for the final but being listed as first reserve.

Athlete	Event	Qualification								Final							
Athlete	Event	Apparatus						Total	Rank	Apparatus						Total	Rank
Athlete	Event	F	PH	R	V	PB	HB	Total	Rank	F	PH	R	V	PB	HB	Total	Rank
Matvei Petrov	Pommel horse	—N/a	14.733	—N/a				14.733	10	Did not advance							

== Judo ==
Albania entered one male judoka into the Olympic tournament after International Judo Federation awarded them a tripartite commission quota.

Athlete	Event	Round of 32	Round of 16	Quarterfinals	Semifinals	Repechage	Final / BM	
Athlete	Event	Opposition Result	Opposition Result	Opposition Result	Opposition Result	Opposition Result	Opposition Result	Rank
Indrit Cullhaj	Men's −66 kg	Chinchila (CRC); L 00–11	Did not advance					

== Shooting ==
Albania was represented by Manuela Delilaj in the shooting tournament of the 2020 Summer Olympics. The nation received an invitation from the Tripartite Commission (TC) to send a women's air pistol shooter to the games, as long as the minimum qualifying score (MQS) was fulfilled by June 2021. Delilaj competed in the women's 10 m air pistol category on 25 July 2021 and was ranked 37 overall.

Athlete	Event	Qualification		Final	
Athlete	Event	Points	Rank	Points	Rank
Manuela Delilaj	Women's 10 m air pistol	565	37	Did not advance	
Manuela Delilaj	Women's 25 m pistol	556	44	Did not advance	

== Swimming ==
Albania was represented by Kledi Kadiu and Nikol Merizaj in the swimming tournament of the 2020 Summer Olympics. The nation received a universality invitation from International Swimming Federation (FINA) to send two top-ranked swimmers in their respective individual events to the games based on the federation's points system of July 2021. Kadiu competed in the men's 100 m freestyle category on 27 July 2021 and was ranked 52 overall. Following this on 30 July, Merizaj participated in the women's 50 m freestyle category and eventually finished 42 overall.

Athlete	Event	Heat		Semifinal		Final	
Athlete	Event	Time	Rank	Time	Rank	Time	Rank
Kledi Kadiu	Men's 100 m freestyle	51.65	52	Did not advance			
Nikol Merizaj	Women's 50 m freestyle	26.21	42	Did not advance			

== Weightlifting ==
Albania was represented by Briken Calja and Erkand Qerimaj in the weightlifting tournament of the 2020 Summer Olympics. The nations weightlifters qualified for two quota places based on the 2020 rankings qualification list of June 2021. Calja competed in the men's 73kg category on 28 July 2021 and was ranked fourth overall, narrowly missing out the country's first ever olympic medal.

Athlete	Event	Snatch		Clean & Jerk		Total	Rank
Athlete	Event	Result	Rank	Result	Rank	Total	Rank
Briken Calja	Men's −73 kg	151	7	190	4	341	4
Erkand Qerimaj	Men's −81 kg	157	11	181	9	338	9
