= Albania at the 1996 Summer Olympics =

- IOC code: ALB
- NOC: Albanian National Olympic Committee
- Website: nocalbania.org.al (in Albanian)

in Atlanta
- Competitors: 7 (3 men and 4 women) in 5 sports
- Flag bearer: Mirela Manjani
- Medals: Gold 0 Silver 0 Bronze 0 Total 0

Summer Olympics appearances (overview)
- 1972; 1976–1988; 1992; 1996; 2000; 2004; 2008; 2012; 2016; 2020; 2024

Albania was represented at the 1996 Summer Olympics in Atlanta, Georgia, United States by the Albanian National Olympic Committee.

In total, seven athletes including three men and four women represented Albania in five different sports including athletics, cycling, shooting, weightlifting and wrestling.

== Competitors ==
In total, seven athletes represented Albania at the 1996 Summer Olympics in Atlanta, Georgia, United States across five different sports.

Sport	Men	Women	Total
Athletic	0	2	2
Cycling	1	0	1
Shooting	0	2	2
Weightlifting	1	0	1
Wrestling	1	0	1
Total	3	4	7

== Athletics ==
Two Albanian athletes participated in the athletics events – Mirela Maniani competed in the women's javelin throw and Vera Bitanji competed in the women's triple jump.

Qualifying for the women's javelin throw took place on 26 July 1996. Maniani contested qualifying group A. Her first two attempts resulted in fouls but, on her third attempt, she threw 55.64 m. She did not advance to the final and finished 24th overall.

Qualifying for the women's triple jump took place on 29 July 1996. Bitanji contested qualifying group A. Her first attempt was 12.55 m before she extended that to 12.82 m with her second jump which was her farthest in qualifying after a foul on her third attempt. She did not advance to the final and finished 25th overall.

Women

Athlete	Event	Qualification		Final	
Athlete	Event	Distance	Position	Distance	Position
Mirela Maniani	javelin throw	55.64	24	Did not advance	
Vera Bitanji	triple jump	12.82	25	Did not advance	

== Cycling ==
One Albanian athlete participated in the cycling events – Besnik Musaj competed in the men's road race.

The men's road race took place on 31 July 1996. Musaj did not finish.

Athlete	Event	Time	Rank
Besnik Musaj	Men's road race	-	DNF

== Shooting ==
Two Albanian athletes participated in the shooting events – Djana Mata and Enkelejda Shehu who both competed in the women's 10 m air pistol and the women's 25 m pistol.

The women's 10 m air pistol took place on 21 July 1996. In the preliminary round, Shehu shot a combined score of 377 across the four rounds and Mata shot a combined score of 363. Neither advanced to the final. Shehu finished joint-21st and Mata finished 38th overall.

The women's 25 m pistol took place on 26 July 1996. In the preliminary round, Shehu shot a combined score of 576 across the two rounds and Mata shot a combined score of 575. Neither advanced to the final. Shehu finished joint-15th and Mata finished 20th overall.

Women

Athlete	Events	Qualification		Final	
Athlete	Events	Score	Rank	Score	Rank
Djana Mata	10m air pistol	363	38	Did not advance	
Djana Mata	25m pistol	575	20	Did not advance	
Enkelejda Shehu	10m air pistol	377	21	Did not advance	
Enkelejda Shehu	25m pistol	576	15	Did not advance	

== Weightlifting ==
One Albanian athlete participated in the weightlifting events – Ilirjan Suli competed in the men's 76 kg.

The men's 76 kg took place on 24 July 1996. Suli lifted 147.5 kg (snatch) and 175 kg (clean and jerk) for a combined score of 322.5 kg which placed him 14th in the overall rankings.

Athlete	Event	Snatch		Clean & jerk		Total	Rank
Athlete	Event	Result	Rank	Result	Rank	Total	Rank
Ilirjan Suli	76 kg	147.5	=14	175	=15	322.5	14

== Wrestling ==
One Albanian athlete participated in the wrestling events – Shkëlqim Troplini competed in the men's freestyle −100 kg.

The men's freestyle −100 kg took place on 30–31 July 1996. Troplini lost his first round match against Oleg Ladik of Canada by fall. He then lost his classification round two match by grand superiority to Davud Magomedov of Azerbaijan.

Athlete	Event	Round 1	Round 2	Round 3	Round 4	Round 5	Final / BM	
Athlete	Event	Opposition Result	Opposition Result	Opposition Result	Opposition Result	Opposition Result	Opposition Result	Rank
Shkëlqim Troplini	freestyle −100 kg	Ladik (CAN); L Fall	Magomedov (AZE); L 0-10	Did not advance				18
