= Albania at the 1992 Summer Olympics =

- IOC code: ALB
- NOC: Albanian National Olympic Committee

in Barcelona
- Competitors: 7 (5 men and 2 women) in 4 sports
- Flag bearer: Kristo Robo
- Medals: Gold 0 Silver 0 Bronze 0 Total 0

Summer Olympics appearances (overview)
- 1972; 1976–1988; 1992; 1996; 2000; 2004; 2008; 2012; 2016; 2020; 2024

Albania competed at the 1992 Summer Olympics in Barcelona, Spain. It had been twenty years since the nation had last participated in the Summer Olympics, specifically at the Games in Munich.

== Competitors ==
The following is the list of number of competitors in the Games.

Sport	Men	Women	Total
Athletics	0	1	1
Shooting	1	1	2
Swimming	1	0	1
Weightlifting	3	–	3
Total	5	2	7

== Athletics ==
Women

Combined events – Heptathlon

Athlete	Event	100H	HJ	SP	200 m	LJ	JT	800 m	Final	Rank
Alma Qeramixhi	Result	15.90	NM	10.70	27.81	4.99	DNS	DNS	DNF	
Alma Qeramixhi	Points	727	0	575	646	557	DNS	DNS	DNF	

== Shooting ==
Men

Athlete	Events	Qualification		Final		Rank
Athlete	Events	Score	Rank	Score	Rank	Rank
Kristo Robo	25 m rapid fire pistol	565	30	Did not advance		30

Women

Athlete	Events	Qualification		Final		Rank
Athlete	Events	Score	Rank	Score	Rank	Rank
Enkelejda Shehu	25 m pistol	575	14	Did not advance		14

== Swimming ==
Men

Athletes	Events	Heat		Finals	
Athletes	Events	Time	Rank	Time	Rank
Frank Leskaj	50 m freestyle	24.72	50	Did not advance	
Frank Leskaj	100 m freestyle	55.50	62	Did not advance	
Frank Leskaj	100 m breaststroke	1:14.28	56	Did not advance	

== Weightlifting ==
Athletes	Events	Snatch		Clean & Jerk		Total	Rank
Athletes	Events	Result	Rank	Result	Rank	Total	Rank
Sokol Bishanaku	-67.5 kg	125	14	157.5	=13	282.5	13
Fatmir Bushi	-67.5 kg	130	=10	160	=10	290	11
Dede Dekaj	-110 kg	162.5	=15	217.5	=6	380	9
