= Albania at the 2022 World Aquatics Championships =

- Flag of Albania
- FINA code: ALB
- National federation: Albanian Swimming Federation

in Budapest, Hungary
- Competitors: 2 in 1 sport
- Medals: Gold 0 Silver 0 Bronze 0 Total 0

World Aquatics Championships appearances
- 2003; 2005; 2007; 2009; 2011; 2013; 2015; 2017; 2019; 2022; 2023; 2024

Albania competed at the 2022 World Aquatics Championships in Budapest, Hungary from 18 June to 3 July.

== Swimming ==
Albanian swimmers have achieved qualifying standards in the following events.

Athlete	Event	Heat		Semifinal		Final	
Athlete	Event	Time	Rank	Time	Rank	Time	Rank
Kledi Kadiu	Men's 100 m freestyle	did not start					
Kledi Kadiu	Men's 50 m breaststroke	29.15	40	did not advance			
Nikol Merizaj	Women's 50 m freestyle	26.44	38	did not advance			
Nikol Merizaj	Women's 50 m butterfly	27.83	38	did not advance			
