= Albania at the 2017 World Aquatics Championships =

- Flag of Albania
- FINA code: ALB
- National federation: Albanian Swimming Federation

in Budapest, Hungary
- Competitors: 4 in 1 sport
- Medals: Gold 0 Silver 0 Bronze 0 Total 0

World Aquatics Championships appearances
- 2003; 2005; 2007; 2009; 2011; 2013; 2015; 2017; 2019; 2022; 2023; 2024

Albania competed at the 2017 World Aquatics Championships in Budapest, Hungary from 14 to 30 July.

== Swimming ==
Albania has received a Universality invitation from FINA to send a maximum of four swimmers (two men and two women) to the World Championships.

Athlete	Event	Heat		Semifinal		Final	
Athlete	Event	Time	Rank	Time	Rank	Time	Rank
Françi Aleksi	Men's 800 m freestyle	8:37.23	30	—		did not advance	
Françi Aleksi	Men's 1500 m freestyle	16:42.97	37	—		did not advance	
Klavio Meça	Men's 200 m freestyle	1:57.23	65	did not advance			
Klavio Meça	Men's 400 m freestyle	4:04.03	45	—		did not advance	
Diana Basho	Women's 200 m freestyle	2:22.86	48	did not advance			
Diana Basho	Women's 50 m butterfly	34.09	57	did not advance			
Nikol Merizaj	Women's 50 m freestyle	27.51	=52	did not advance			
Nikol Merizaj	Women's 100 m freestyle	1:00.04	58	did not advance			
