= Albania at the 2000 Summer Olympics =

- IOC code: ALB
- NOC: Albanian National Olympic Committee
- Website: nocalbania.org.al (in Albanian)

in Sydney
- Competitors: 4 in 3 sports
- Flag bearer: Ilirian Suli
- Medals: Gold 0 Silver 0 Bronze 0 Total 0

Summer Olympics appearances (overview)
- 1972; 1976–1988; 1992; 1996; 2000; 2004; 2008; 2012; 2016; 2020; 2024

Albania competed at the 2000 Summer Olympics in Sydney.

== Athletics ==
Men
Track & road events

Athlete	Event	Heat		2nd round		Semifinal		Final	
Athlete	Event	Result	Rank	Result	Rank	Result	Rank	Result	Rank
Oltion Luli	100 m	11.08	8	Did not advance					

Women
Track & road events

Athlete	Event	Heat		2nd round		Semifinal		Final	
Athlete	Event	Result	Rank	Result	Rank	Result	Rank	Result	Rank
Klodiana Shala	400 m	56.41	7	Did not advance					

== Shooting ==
Women

Athlete	Events	Qualification		Final	
Athlete	Events	Score	Rank	Score	Rank
Djana Mata	10m air pistol	378	21	Did not advance	
Djana Mata	25m pistol	579	11	Did not advance	

== Weightlifting ==
Athlete	Event	Snatch		Clean & jerk		Total	Rank
Athlete	Event	Result	Rank	Result	Rank	Total	Rank
Ilirjan Suli	Men's −77 kg	162.5	4	192.5	6	355	5
