= Albania at the 2010 European Aquatics Championships =

2010 European Long Course Swimming Championships
- Host city: Budapest, Hungary
- Date: 4–15 August 2010
- Athletes participating: 2

Albania competed at the 2010 European Aquatics Championships in Budapest, Hungary between 4–15 August 2010.

== Swimming ==
Albania sent with an invite one swimmer, Mario Sulkja. Another swimmer was allowed to participate in time trials, Besmir Buranaj Hoxha. Due to registration issues, Hoxha, was unable to fully compete in the championships.

Athlete	Event	Rank		Semifinals		Final	
Athlete	Event	Time	Rank	Time	Rank	Time	Rank
Mario Sulkja	Men's 50m Freestyle	25.54	61	did not advance			
Mario Sulkja	Men's 100m Freestyle	56.15	64	did not advance			
Beso Buranaj Hoxha	Men's 50m Breaststroke	32.89	NA	NA			

== See also ==
- Albania at the 2008 Summer Olympics
- Albania at the 2005 Mediterranean Games
- Albania at the 2013 Mediterranean Games
- Albania at the 2011 World Aquatics Championships
- Albania at the 2012 Summer Olympics
