= Swimming at the 2010 Commonwealth Games – Men's 4 × 200 metre freestyle relay =

The Men's 4 × 200 metre freestyle relay event at the 2010 Commonwealth Games took place on 6 October 2010, at the SPM Swimming Pool Complex.

Two heats were held, with both containing six countries. The heat in which a country competed in did not formally matter for advancement, as the countries with the top eight times from the entire field qualified for the finals.

== Heats ==
=== Heat 1 ===
Rank	Lane	Names	Time	Notes
1	4	Canada; Blake Worsley (1:52.02); Sean Penhale (1:54.39); Stefan Hirniak (1:54.11); Brian Johns (1:56.77)	7:37.29	Q
2	3	Malaysia; Foo Jian Beng (1:55.81); Soon Yeap (1:55.36); Leam Lee (1:58.61); Daniel Bego (1:54.14)	7:43.92	Q
3	2	Singapore; Zhen Teo (1:57.10); Jeremy Matthews (1:57.35); Arren Quek (1:56.18); Jia Ng (1:56.56)	7:45.73	Q
4	3	Guernsey; Ian Powell (1:55.82); Ian Hubert (1:59.81); Thomas Hollingsworth (1:54.92); Ben Lowndes (2:00.20)	7:50.75	

=== Heat 2 ===
Rank	Lane	Names	Time	Notes
1	4	Australia; Nicholas Ffrost (1:49.00); Ryan Napoleon (1:48.01); Leith Brodie (1:49.85); Kenrick Monk (1:55.61)	7:22.47	Q
2	5	England; Robert Bale (1:50.54); Daniel Coombs (1:49.95); Steven Beckerleg (1:51.45); Richard Charlesworth (1:50.67)	7:22.61	Q
3	6	Scotland; Andrew Hunter (1:49.03); Lewis Smith (1:52.12); Cameron Brodie (1:55.09); Jak Scott (1:50.74)	7:26.98	Q
4	2	South Africa; Sebastien Rousseau (1:50.73); Heerden Herman (1:53.39); Chad le Clos (2:05.09); Jean Basson (1:56.52)	7:45.73	Q
5	3	India; Rehan Poncha (1:58.64); Rohit Havaldar (1:58.11); Mandar Divase (1:57.28); Aaron Dsouza (1:55.17)	7:49.20	Q

== Final ==
Rank	Lane	Names	Time	Notes
1st place, gold medalist(s)	4	Australia; Thomas Fraser-Holmes (1:47.04); Nicholas Ffrost (1:48.68); Ryan Napoleon (1:47.05); Kenrick Monk (1:47.52)	7:10.29	CGR
2nd place, silver medalist(s)	3	Scotland; Andrew Hunter (1:48.32); David Carry (1:48.00); Jak Scott (1:50.32); Robert Renwick (1:47.38)	7:14.02	
3rd place, bronze medalist(s)	7	South Africa; Jean Basson (1:47.82); Darian Townsend (1:48.80); Jan Venter (1:49.10); Chad le Clos (1:48.46)	7:14.18	
4	6	Canada; Stefan Hirniak (1:49.82); Brent Hayden (1:47.56); Brian Johns (1:48.70); Ryan Cochrane (1:48.55)	7:14.63	
5	5	England; Robert Bale (1:48.72); Ross Davenport (1:48.44); Daniel Coombs (1:49.21); Christopher Walker-Hebborn (1:50.20)	7:16.57	
6	2	Malaysia; Daniel Bego (1:53.27); Soon Yeap (1:55.18); Leam Lee (2:00.01); Foo Jian Beng (1:55.07)	7:43.53	
7	8	India; Rehan Poncha (1:56.87); Rohit Havaldar (1:56.51); Mandar Divase (1:58.08); Aaron Dsouza (1:54.72)	7:46.18	
–	1	Singapore		DNS
