= Albania at the 2011 World Aquatics Championships =

- Flag of Albania
- FINA code: ALB
- National federation: Albanian Swimming Federation

in Shanghai, China
- Competitors: 3 in 1 sports
- Medals: Gold 0 Silver 0 Bronze 0 Total 0

World Aquatics Championships appearances
- 2003; 2005; 2007; 2009; 2011; 2013; 2015; 2017; 2019; 2022; 2023; 2024

Albania competed at the 2011 World Aquatics Championships in Shanghai, China between July 16 and 31, 2011.

== Swimming ==
Albania qualified 3 swimmers.

Men

Athlete	Event	Heats		Semifinals		Final	
Athlete	Event	Time	Rank	Time	Rank	Time	Rank
Sidni Hoxha	Men's 50m Freestyle	23.18	39	did not advance			
Sidni Hoxha	Men's 100m Freestyle	51.51	48	did not advance			
Edwin Angjeli	Men's 200m Butterfly	2:06.68	39	did not advance			
Edwin Angjeli	Men's 200m IM	2:10.27	44	did not advance			

Women

Athlete	Event	Heats		Semifinals		Final	
Athlete	Event	Time	Rank	Time	Rank	Time	Rank
Noel Borshi	Women's 100m Butterfly	1:05.71	43	did not advance			
Noel Borshi	Women's 200m Butterfly	2:29.16	33	did not advance			

== See also ==
- Albania at the 2010 European Aquatics Championships
- Albania at the 2012 Summer Olympics
