= Albania at the 2013 World Aquatics Championships =

- Flag of Albania
- FINA code: ALB
- National federation: Albanian Swimming Federation

in Barcelona, Spain
- Competitors: 4 in 1 sports
- Medals: Gold 0 Silver 0 Bronze 0 Total 0

World Aquatics Championships appearances
- 2003; 2005; 2007; 2009; 2011; 2013; 2015; 2017; 2019; 2022; 2023; 2024

Albania competed at the 2013 World Aquatics Championships in Barcelona, Spain between 19 July and 4 August 2013.

== Swimming ==
Albanian swimmers earned qualifying standards in the following events (up to a maximum of 2 swimmers in each event at the A-standard entry time, and 1 at the B-standard):

Men

Athlete	Event	Heat		Semifinal		Final	
Athlete	Event	Time	Rank	Time	Rank	Time	Rank
Klavio Meça	400 m freestyle	4:27.25	46	—		did not advance	
Evin Zekthi	200 m freestyle	2:00.43	59	did not advance			

Women

Athlete	Event	Heat		Semifinal		Final	
Athlete	Event	Time	Rank	Time	Rank	Time	Rank
Noel Borshi	100 m butterfly	1:06.77	46	did not advance			
Anxhela Kashari	50 m freestyle	28.48	58	did not advance			
