= Phillip Morrison =

Brazilian swimmer

Personal information
- Full name: Phillip Cameron Morrison
- National team: Brazil
- Born: 29 December 1984 (age 41) São Luís, Maranhão, Brazil
- Height: 1.89 m (6 ft 2 in)
- Weight: 84 kg (185 lb)

Sport
- Sport: Swimming
- Strokes: Freestyle
- College team: Stanford University (U.S.)

Phillip Cameron Morrison (born 29 December 1984 in São Luís, Maranhão) is a Brazilian swimmer of American descent, who specialized in freestyle events. He represented his nation Brazil as a member of the freestyle relay team at the 2008 Summer Olympics, and also served as a member of the Stanford Cardinal swimming squad at Stanford University in Stanford, California, where he graduated with a degree in earth systems, major in human biology.

Morrison competed as a member of the Brazilian team in the 4 × 200 m freestyle relay at the 2008 Summer Olympics in Beijing. Despite missing out the individual spot in the 200 m freestyle, he managed to place fourth at the annual Maria Lenk Trophy in Rio de Janeiro (1:49.04) to earn a selection on the relay team. Teaming with Rodrigo Castro, Nicolas Oliveira, and Lucas Salatta in heat one, Morrison swam the third leg with a split of 1:49.35, but the Brazilian team had to settle for last place out of sixteen registered nations in 7:19.54.
