= Jan Venter =

South African swimmer (born 1988)

Personal information
- Full name: Jan Albert Venter
- Nationality: South Africa
- Born: 23 April 1988 (age 38) Hartenbos, Western Cape, South Africa
- Height: 1.80 m (5 ft 11 in)
- Weight: 65 kg (143 lb)

Sport
- Sport: Swimming
- Strokes: Freestyle
- Club: TuksSport
Medal record
Men's swimming
Representing South Africa
Commonwealth Games
Bronze medal – third place	2010 Delhi	4×200 m freestyle
All-Africa Games
Gold medal – first place	2011 Maputo	4×200 m freestyle
Bronze medal – third place	2011 Maputo	800 m freestyle

Jan Albert Venter (also Jasper Venter; born 23 April 1988 in Hartenbos, Western Cape) is a South African swimmer, who specialized in freestyle events. Venter won a bronze medal, as a member of the South African team, in the 4 × 200 metre freestyle relay at the 2010 Commonwealth Games in Delhi, India. He also helped his team to claim the title in the same relay distance at the 2011 All-Africa Games in Maputo, Mozambique, posting a meet record time of 7:33.63.

Venter qualified as a member of the South African team for the 4 × 200 metre freestyle relay at the 2008 Summer Olympics in Beijing, by placing third in the same distance from the national championships (1:50.60). Teaming with Sebastien Rousseau, Darian Townsend, and Jean Basson, Venter swam the third leg with a split of 1:49.56, but the South Africans rounded out the final field to last place in 7:13.02. Previously, they set an African standard of 7:10.91 from the preliminary heats.

At the 2009 FINA World Championships in Rome, Italy, Venter helped out his South African team (Basson, Rousseau, and Townsend) to dip under a 7:10 barrier, and broke a new record of 7:08.01 in the 4 × 200 m freestyle relay.
