= Albania at the 2008 Summer Olympics =

- IOC code: ALB
- NOC: Albanian National Olympic Committee
- Website: nocalbania.org.al (in Albanian)

in Beijing
- Competitors: 11 in 6 sports
- Flag bearer: Sahit Prizreni
- Medals: Gold 0 Silver 0 Bronze 0 Total 0

Summer Olympics appearances (overview)
- 1972; 1976–1988; 1992; 1996; 2000; 2004; 2008; 2012; 2016; 2020; 2024; 2028

Albania sent a team to compete at the 2008 Summer Olympics in Beijing, China which was organised by the National Olympic Committee of Albania. Although Albania didn't win any medals, it was an improvement on their performance at the 2004 Summer Olympics in Athens. Sahit Prizreni was the nation's flag bearer at the opening ceremony of the Games.

Albania competed with eleven athletes, seven of whom were men and four were women, competing in several sports such as athletics (hammer throw and 400 metres), and for the first time in judo. Other sports Albania participated in were swimming, weightlifting, wrestling, and shooting.

Weightlifter Romela Begaj came the closest to the medal rankings as she finished 5th in the Women's 58 kg category, lifting 216 kg in total.

The Albanians also showed good performances outside weightlifting. Sahit Prizreni, the bronze medalist from the 2007 World Wrestling Championships in Baku was competing for the second time for Albania in the Summer Olympics. He advanced to the round of 16 in Men's freestyle 60 kg, where he lost to Bazar Bazarguruev from Kyrgyzstan.

Elis Guri made his debut at the Summer Olympics in wrestling in the Men's Greco-Roman 96 kg category. In the round of 16 he defeated the Olympic champion of 2004, Karam Gaber, after three matches. In the quarterfinals he faced Mirko Englich of Germany. Despite a first-match win, Guri lost the other two matches and didn't qualify to the semifinals. He finished in 7th place, the second best result for Albania at these Games.

== Athletics ==
Key

- Note – Ranks given for track events are within the athlete's heat only
- Q = Qualified for the next round
- q = Qualified for the next round as a fastest loser or, in field events, by position without achieving the qualifying target
- NR = National record
- N/A = Round not applicable for the event
- Bye = Athlete not required to compete in round

Men

Athlete	Event	Qualification		Final	
Athlete	Event	Distance	Position	Distance	Position
Dorian Çollaku	Hammer throw	70.98	28	Did not advance	

Women

Athlete	Event	Heat		Semifinal		Final	
Athlete	Event	Result	Rank	Result	Rank	Result	Rank
Klodiana Shala	400 m	54.84	7	Did not advance			

== Judo ==
Men

Athlete	Event	Preliminary	Round of 32	Round of 16	Quarterfinals	Semifinals	Repechage 1	Repechage 2	Repechage 3	Final / BM	
Athlete	Event	Opposition Result	Opposition Result	Opposition Result	Opposition Result	Opposition Result	Opposition Result	Opposition Result	Opposition Result	Opposition Result	Rank
Edmond Topalli	Men's −81 kg	Bye	Neto (POR); L 0000–1001	Did not advance							

== Shooting ==
Women

Athlete	Event	Qualification		Final	
Athlete	Event	Points	Rank	Points	Rank
Lindita Kodra	10 m air pistol	370	40	Did not advance	
Lindita Kodra	25 m pistol	570	35	Did not advance	

== Swimming ==
Men

Athlete	Event	Heat		Semifinal		Final	
Athlete	Event	Time	Rank	Time	Rank	Time	Rank
Sidni Hoxha	50 m freestyle	24.56	63	Did not advance			

Women

Athlete	Event	Heat		Semifinal		Final	
Athlete	Event	Time	Rank	Time	Rank	Time	Rank
Rovena Marku	50 m freestyle	28.15	=58	Did not advance			

== Weightlifting ==
Athlete	Event	Snatch		Clean & Jerk		Total	Rank
Athlete	Event	Result	Rank	Result	Rank	Total	Rank
Gert Trasha	Men's −69 kg	~~136~~	DNF	—	—	—	DNF
Erkand Qerimaj	Men's −77 kg	154	12	187	13	341	13
Romela Begaj	Women's −58 kg	98	=3	118	7	216	5

== Wrestling ==
Key

- VT - Victory by Fall.
- PP - Decision by Points - the loser with technical points.
- PO - Decision by Points - the loser without technical points.

Men's freestyle

Athlete	Event	Qualification	Round of 16	Quarterfinal	Semifinal	Repechage 1	Repechage 2	Final / BM	
Athlete	Event	Opposition Result	Opposition Result	Opposition Result	Opposition Result	Opposition Result	Opposition Result	Opposition Result	Rank
Sahit Prizreni	−60 kg	Bye	Bazarguruev (KGZ); L 0–3 ^{PO}	Did not advance					15

Men's Greco-Roman

Athlete	Event	Qualification	Round of 16	Quarterfinal	Semifinal	Repechage 1	Repechage 2	Final / BM	
Athlete	Event	Opposition Result	Opposition Result	Opposition Result	Opposition Result	Opposition Result	Opposition Result	Opposition Result	Rank
Elis Guri	−96 kg	Bye	Gaber (EGY); W 3–1 ^{PP}	Englich (GER); L 1–3 ^{PP}	Did not advance	Bye	Han T-Y (KOR); L 1–3 ^{PP}	Did not advance	7
