= Hisato Matsumoto =

Japanese swimmer (born 1984)

Personal information
- Full name: Hisato Matsumoto
- National team: Japan
- Born: 5 October 1984 (age 41) Mito, Ibaraki, Japan
- Height: 1.84 m (6 ft 0 in)
- Weight: 82 kg (181 lb)

Sport
- Sport: Swimming
- Strokes: Freestyle

Hisato Matsumoto (松本 尚人, Matsumoto Hisato; born October 5, 1984 in Mito, Ibaraki) is a Japanese swimmer, who specialized in freestyle events. He represented his nation Japan at the 2008 Summer Olympics, placing himself in the fourteenth position as a member of the 4 × 200 m freestyle relay team. Matsumoto is a kinesiology graduate, with a minor degree in humanities, at Nihon University in Tokyo.

Matsumoto competed as a member of the Japanese team in the 4 × 200 m freestyle relay at the 2008 Summer Olympics in Beijing. Despite missing out the individual spot in the 200 m freestyle, he managed to place third at the Olympic trials in Tokyo (1:48.97) to earn a selection on the relay team. Teaming with Yasunori Mononobe, Yoshihiro Okumura, and Sho Uchida in heat one, Matsumoto swam the anchor leg to close the race with a split of 1:48.62, but the Japanese team had to settle for seventh place and fourteenth overall in 7:10.31.
