= Albania at the 2019 World Aquatics Championships =

- Flag of Albania
- FINA code: ALB
- National federation: Albanian Swimming Federation

in Gwangju, South Korea
- Medals: Gold 0 Silver 0 Bronze 0 Total 0

World Aquatics Championships appearances
- 2003; 2005; 2007; 2009; 2011; 2013; 2015; 2017; 2019; 2022; 2023; 2024

Albania competed at the 2019 World Aquatics Championships in Gwangju, South Korea from 12 to 28 July.

== Swimming ==
Albania entered four swimmers.

Men

Athlete	Event	Heat		Semifinal		Final	
Athlete	Event	Time	Rank	Time	Rank	Time	Rank
Françi Aleksi	400 m freestyle	4:07.39	44	—		did not advance	
Françi Aleksi	800 m freestyle	8:33.54	37	—		did not advance	
Kledi Kadiu	100 m freestyle	52.53	=80	did not advance			
Kledi Kadiu	200 m freestyle	1:55.11	57	did not advance			

Women

Athlete	Event	Heat		Semifinal		Final	
Athlete	Event	Time	Rank	Time	Rank	Time	Rank
Nikol Merizaj	50 m freestyle	27.40	54	did not advance			
Nikol Merizaj	100 m freestyle	59.60	57	did not advance			
Katie Rock	100 m butterfly	1:07.85	46	did not advance			
Katie Rock	200 m butterfly	2:28.58	31	did not advance			
