= Albania at the 2024 Summer Olympics =

- IOC code: ALB
- NOC: Albanian National Olympic Committee
- Website: nocalbania.org.al (in Albanian)

in Paris, France 26 July 2024 – 11 August 2024
- Competitors: 8 (5 men and 3 women) in 4 sports
- Flag bearers (opening): Zelimkhan Abakarov & Kaltra Meça
- Flag bearer (closing): Islam Dudaev
- Medals Ranked 80th: Gold 0 Silver 0 Bronze 2 Total 2

Summer Olympics appearances (overview)
- 1972; 1976–1988; 1992; 1996; 2000; 2004; 2008; 2012; 2016; 2020; 2024

Albania competed at the 2024 Summer Olympics in Paris from 26 July to 11 August 2024, represented by the Albanian National Olympic Committee (KOKSH). It signified the nation's tenth appearance at the summer Olympics, since the official debut in 1972, except for 1976, 1980 due to the US led boycott, 1984 due to USSR led boycott, 1988, the nation's return for the Olympics in 1992.

Albania earned their first Olympic medals in any sport, with wrestler Chermen Valiev winning bronze in the men's freestyle 74 kg category, and later earning their second bronze won by fellow wrestler Islam Dudaev in the men's freestyle 65 kg category.

== Medalists ==
Medal	Name	Sport	Event	Date
Bronze	Chermen Valiev	Wrestling	Men's freestyle 74 kg	10 August
Bronze	Islam Dudaev	Wrestling	Men's freestyle 65 kg	11 August

Medals by sport
Sport	1st place, gold medalist(s)	2nd place, silver medalist(s)	3rd place, bronze medalist(s)	Total
Wrestling	0	0	2	2
Total	0	0	2	2

Medals by gender
Gender	1st place, gold medalist(s)	2nd place, silver medalist(s)	3rd place, bronze medalist(s)	Total
Female	0	0	0	0
Male	0	0	2	2
Mixed	0	0	0	0
Total	0	0	2	2

Medals by date
Date	1st place, gold medalist(s)	2nd place, silver medalist(s)	3rd place, bronze medalist(s)	Total
10 August	0	0	1	1
11 August	0	0	1	1
Total	0	0	2	2

== Competitors ==
The following is the list of number of competitors in the Games.

Sport	Men	Women	Total
Athletics	1	1	2
Shooting	0	1	1
Swimming	1	1	2
Wrestling	3	0	3
Total	5	3	8

== Athletics ==
Albanian track and field athletes achieved the entry standards for Paris 2024, either by passing the direct qualifying mark (or time for track and road races) or by world ranking, in the following events (a maximum of 3 athletes each):

Key

- Note–Ranks given for track events are within the athlete's heat only
- Q = Qualified for the next round
- q = Qualified for the next round as a fastest loser or, in field events, by position without achieving the qualifying target
- NR = National record
- N/A = Round not applicable for the event
- Bye = Athlete not required to compete in round

Track events

Athlete	Event	Preliminary		Heat		Semifinal		Final	
Athlete	Event	Result	Rank	Result	Rank	Result	Rank	Result	Rank
Franko Burraj	Men's 100 m	10.60 PB	2 Q	10.66	8	Did not advance			
Luiza Gega	Women's 3000 m steeplechase	—N/a		9:27.41	9	—N/a		Did not advance	

== Shooting ==
Albanian shooters achieved one quota places for Paris 2024 based on the allocations of universality spots.

Athlete	Event	Qualification		Final	
Athlete	Event	Points	Rank	Points	Rank
Manjola Konini	Women's 10 m air pistol	549	43	Did not advance	
Manjola Konini	Women's 25 m pistol	569-10x	37	Did not advance	

== Swimming ==
Albania sent two swimmers to compete at the 2024 Paris Olympics.

Athlete	Event	Heat		Semifinal		Final	
Athlete	Event	Time	Rank	Time	Rank	Time	Rank
Grisi Koxhaku	Men's 100 m freestyle	52:32	62	Did not advance			
Kaltra Meça	Women's 200 m freestyle	2:12.21	27	Did not advance			

== Wrestling ==
For the first time since 2008, Albania qualified three wrestlers for the following classes into the Olympic competition. Zelimkhan Abakarov qualified for the games by virtue of top five results through the 2023 World Championships in Belgrade, Serbia; meanwhile Islam Dudaev and Chermen Valiev qualified for the games through the 2024 World Qualification Tournament in Istanbul, Turkey.

Key:

- VT (ranking points: 5–0 or 0–5) – Victory by fall.
- VB (ranking points: 5–0 or 0–5) – Victory by injury (VF for forfeit, VA for withdrawal or disqualification)
- PP (ranking points: 3–1 or 1–3) – Decision by points – the loser with technical points.
- PO (ranking points: 3–0 or 0–3) – Decision by points – the loser without technical points.
- ST (ranking points: 4–0 or 0–4) – Great superiority – the loser without technical points and a margin of victory of at least 8 (Greco-Roman) or 10 (freestyle) points.
- SP (ranking points: 4–1 or 1–4) – Technical superiority – the loser with technical points and a margin of victory of at least 8 (Greco-Roman) or 10 (freestyle) points.

Freestyle

Athlete	Event	Round of 16	Quarterfinal	Semifinal	Repechage	Final / BM	
Athlete	Event	Opposition Result	Opposition Result	Opposition Result	Opposition Result	Opposition Result	Rank
Zelimkhan Abakarov	Men's −57 kg	Iuna Fafé (GBS); W 7–6^{PP}	Sehrawat (IND); L 0–12ST	Did not advance			8
Islam Dudaev	Men's −65 kg	Akazawa (SAM); W 10–0	Amouzad (IRI); L 0–11	Did not advance	Retherford (USA); W 5–0^{VB}	Musukaev (HUN); W 13–12	3rd place, bronze medalist(s)
Chermen Valiev	Men's −74 kg	Bayramov (AZE); W 4–3	Zhamalov (UZB); L 5–6	Did not advance	Kadzimahamedau (AIN); W 12–2	Rassadin (TJK); W 6–2	3rd place, bronze medalist(s)
