= Yasunori Mononobe =

Japanese swimmer (born 1985)

Personal information
- Full name: Yasunori Mononobe
- National team: Japan
- Born: 30 May 1985 (age 41) Toyohashi, Aichi, Japan
- Height: 1.80 m (5 ft 11 in)
- Weight: 70 kg (154 lb)

Sport
- Sport: Swimming
- Strokes: Freestyle
- Club: Central Sports (JPN)
- Coach: Ryuji Kojima
Medal record
Men's swimming
Representing Japan
Universiade
Gold medal – first place	2009 Belgrade	4×200 m freestyle

Yasunori Mononobe (物延 靖記, Mononobe Yasunori; born 30 May 1985) is a Japanese swimmer, who specialized in freestyle events. He represented his nation Japan at the 2008 Summer Olympics, and has won a gold medal as a member of the Japanese swimming team in the 800 m freestyle relay at the 2009 Summer Universiade in Belgrade, Serbia (7:11.54).

Mononobe competed as a member of the Japanese team in the 4 × 200 m freestyle relay at the 2008 Summer Olympics in Beijing. Despite missing out the individual spot in the 200 m freestyle, he managed to place third at the Olympic trials in Tokyo (1:49.04) to earn a selection on the relay team. Teaming with Hisato Matsumoto, Yoshihiro Okumura, and Sho Uchida in the final, Matsumoto swam the anchor leg to close the race with a split of 1:48.62, but the Japanese team had to settle for seventh place with 7:10.31.
