= Albania at the 2023 World Aquatics Championships =

- Flag of Albania
- FINA code: ALB
- National federation: Albanian Swimming Federation
- Website: fshn.org.al (in Albanian)

in Fukuoka, Japan
- Competitors: 4 in 1 sport
- Medals: Gold 0 Silver 0 Bronze 0 Total 0

World Aquatics Championships appearances
- 2003; 2005; 2007; 2009; 2011; 2013; 2015; 2017; 2019; 2022; 2023; 2024

Albania is set to compete at the 2023 World Aquatics Championships in Fukuoka, Japan from 14 to 30 July.

== Swimming ==
Albania entered 4 swimmers.

Men

Athlete	Event	Heat		Semifinal		Final	
Athlete	Event	Time	Rank	Time	Rank	Time	Rank
Mark Ducaj	200 metre freestyle	Did not start					
Mark Ducaj	400 metre freestyle	4:20.88	55	—		Did not advance	
Zhulian Lavdaniti	100 metre backstroke	58.48	53	Did not advance			
Zhulian Lavdaniti	200 metre individual medley	2:09.32	42	Did not advance			

Women

Athlete	Event	Heat		Semifinal		Final	
Athlete	Event	Time	Rank	Time	Rank	Time	Rank
Katie Rock	100 metre freestyle	1:01.89	57	Did not advance			
Katie Rock	200 metre freestyle	2:15.02	61	Did not advance			
Vivian Xhemollari	200 metre backstroke	2:24.30	38	Did not advance			
Vivian Xhemollari	400 metre individual medley	5:11.38	33	—		Did not advance	
