= Albania at the 2024 World Aquatics Championships =

- Flag of Albania
- FINA code: ALB
- National federation: Albanian Swimming Federation
- Website: fshn.org.al

in Doha, Qatar
- Competitors: 4 in 1 sport
- Medals: Gold 0 Silver 0 Bronze 0 Total 0

World Aquatics Championships appearances
- 2003; 2005; 2007; 2009; 2011; 2013; 2015; 2017; 2019; 2022; 2023; 2024

Albania competed at the 2024 World Aquatics Championships in Doha, Qatar from 2 to 18 February.

== Competitors ==
The following is the list of competitors in the Championships.

Sport	Men	Women	Total
Swimming	2	2	4
Total	2	2	4

== Swimming ==
Albania entered 4 swimmers.

Men

Athlete	Event	Heat		Semifinal		Final	
Athlete	Event	Time	Rank	Time	Rank	Time	Rank
Gresi Koxhaku	50 metre freestyle	23.41	46	Did not advance			
Gresi Koxhaku	100 metre freestyle	52.17	62	Did not advance			
Paolo Priska	50 metre butterfly	26.56	49	Did not advance			
Paolo Priska	100 metre butterfly	59.01	57	Did not advance			

Women

Athlete	Event	Heat		Semifinal		Final	
Athlete	Event	Time	Rank	Time	Rank	Time	Rank
Arla Dermishi	50 metre freestyle	27.46	58	Did not advance			
Arla Dermishi	100 metre freestyle	1:01.23	51	Did not advance			
Kaltra Meca	200 metre freestyle	2:15.95	45	Did not advance			
Kaltra Meca	400 metre freestyle	4:40.47	31	—		Did not advance	
