= Albanian Swimming Federation =

Albanian sports governing body

- Federata Shqiptare e Notit
- Sport: swimming
- Jurisdiction: Albania
- Abbreviation: FSHN
- Founded: 1931
- Affiliation: FINA
- Affiliation date: 1992
- Regional affiliation: LEN
- Affiliation date: 1992
- Headquarters: Tirana
- President: Agim Çiraku
- Secretary: Suela Haxhija, Secretary General

Official website
- fshn.org.al
- (Albania)

The Albanian Swimming Federation (Albanian: Federata Shqiptare e Notit, FSHN) is the national governing body of aquatic sports in Albania, ranging from swimming, diving, synchronized swimming, open water swimming, and water polo. The federation is tasked with the development, promotion and international representation of swimming in Albania.

It is a member of the Albanian National Olympic Committee. The Albanian swimming federation is a member of the European Swimming League (LEN) and the International Swimming Federation (FINA). The Albanian Swimming Federation organizes aquatic sports competitions at national, European and international level in all categories for men and women; junior and adult age groups. The Albanian Swimming Federation works closely with its collaborative associate, the Kosovo swimming federation.

== History ==
Swimming in Albania has its roots in Durrës, where races began centuries ago. The swimming federation was formed in the late 1950s. Albanians more prominent in the sport included Jani Hondro and Spiro Koço.

The first person to represent Albania in the Olympics was an American born Albanian, Frank Leskaj. Leskaj represented Albania in the 1992 Summer Olympics in Barcelona. It was not until the late 2000s where swimming began to flourish in Albania. It was not until 2004 that Albania would be represented again in the summer Olympics by Kreshnik Gjata. Four years later, a young swimmer at the age of 16 years represented Albania again in the 2008 Summer Olympics in Beijing. The swimmers name was Sidni Hoxha and he became a record holder for Albania that year. Till date, Hoxha, is Albania's most successful swimmer. Hoxha has participated in two Olympics, holding more than 50% of the national records, countless European and world championships, two time NCAA swimming competitor, and former Balkan Champion. Hoxha is acclaimed and determined to represent Albania two more times in the Olympics, for a total of four times. Also, in 2008, Albania's first female swimmer was Rovena Marku. Marku, also broke the national record for 50m freestyle that year in Beijing.

In 2012, Sidni Hoxha and Noel Borshi represented Albania in the summer Olympics in London.

== Member clubs ==
As of February 2010 there are more than a dozen member clubs.

- Tirana Delfina Sport, Tirana
- Klubi Sport Not, Tirana
- Nobis Klub Not, Tirana
- Akademia e Notit Stela, Tirana
- Tornado, Tirana
- Teuta, Durrës
- Vllaznia Klub Noti, Shkodër
- Vlore
- Butrinti, Sarandë
- Pogradec

== Results ==
Albania has participated in three Mediterranean Games, three LCM European Championships, four LCM World Championships, and four Summer Olympics.

== See also ==
- List of Albanian swimmers
- Sports in Albania
- Albanian Records in Swimming
- Albanian National Olympic Committee
- Albania at the Olympics
- Albania at the Mediterranean Games
