= Beqir Kosova =

Albanian sport shooter (born 1949)

Personal information
- Born: 20 May 1949 (age 77)

Sport
- Sport: Sports shooting

Beqir Kosova (born 20 May 1949) is an Albanian shooter who competed at the 1972 Summer Olympic Games in the 50 metre rifle prone, he finished 66th.
