= Fatos Pilkati =

Albanian sport shooter (born 1951)

Personal information
- Born: 15 March 1951 (age 75)

Sport
- Sport: Sports shooting

Fatos Pilkati (born 15 March 1951) is an Albanian shooter who competed at the 1972 Summer Olympic Games, he finished 24th.
