= Ismail Rama =

Albanian sport shooter (1935–2022)

Personal information
- Born: Ismail Kosova; 15 September 1935
- Died: 8 April 2022 (aged 86)

Sport
- Sport: Sports shooting

Ismail Rama (née Ismail Kosova; 15 September 1935 – 8 April 2022) was an Albanian shooter who competed at the 1972 Summer Olympic Games in the 50 metre rifle prone, he finished 22nd. Rama died on 8 April 2022, at the age of 86.
