= Jak Scott =

Scottish swimmer

Personal information
- Born: 23 May 1991 (age 35)

Sport
- Country: Great Britain; Scotland
- Sport: Swimming
- Event: Freestyle
Medal record
Representing Scotland
Commonwealth Games
Silver medal – second place	2010 Delhi	4 × 200 m freestyle
Silver medal – second place	2014 Glasgow	4 × 200 m freestyle

Jak Scott (born 23 May 1991) is a Scottish former swimmer.

Scott, a freestyle swimmer, was raised in the town of Hawick and would travel to Edinburgh for training. When he was aged 15 his family relocated to Bo'ness so they could be closer to Edinburgh.

As a 4 × 200 m freestyle relay swimmer, Scott won two silver medals for Scotland at the Commonwealth Games. In Delhi in 2010 he swam the third leg of the final and in Glasgow in 2014 he featured in the heats. He represented Great Britain at the 2011 and 2013 World Championships, reaching the 4 × 200 m freestyle final of the latter.

Scott swam for the University of Stirling.

Retiring in 2016, Scott had personal best times of 49.87 for the 100m freestyle and 1:48.00 for the 200m freestyle.
