= Dede Dekaj =

Albanian weightlifter (born 1970)

Dede Dekaj (born 20 February 1970) is a former Albanian weightlifter who competed at the 1992 Summer Olympics, finishing 9th. In 2020, weightlifting coach Petrit Hoxha declared Dekaj to be the greatest Albanian weightlifter of all time.
