= Enkelejda Shehu =

Albanian sports shooter (born 1969)

Enkelejda Shehu (born 23 January 1969) is an Albanian shooter who competed at the 1992 Summer Olympic Games and the 1996 Summer Olympic Games. She competed in the women's 10 metre air pistol event at the 2016 Summer Olympics for the United States. She lives in Naples, Florida and owns a Greek restaurant with her husband.
