= Djana Mata =

Albanian sports shooter (born 1960)

Djana Mata (born 13 August 1960) is an Albanian shooter who competed at the 1996 Summer Olympics and the 2000 Summer Olympics, her best finish was 11th.
