= Blake Worsley =

Canadian Olympic swimmer (born 1987)

Personal information
- Full name: Blake Thomas Worsley
- Nationality: Canada
- Born: November 7, 1987 (age 38) Vancouver, BC
- Height: 1.98 m (6 ft 6 in)

Sport
- Sport: Swimming
- Strokes: Freestyle
- Club: Island Swimming
- College team: University of Denver
- Coach: Brian Schrader (Denver); R. Bennett (National Team)
Medal record
Men's swimming
Representing Canada
Olympic Trials (LC)
Gold medal – first place	2012 Montreal	200 m freestyle
US Grand Prix: Missouri
Gold medal – first place	2012 Missouri	200 m freestyle
World Championship Trials (LC)
Bronze medal – third place	2011 Victoria	200 m freestyle
Pan Pac Trials (LC)
Bronze medal – third place	2010 Victoria	200 m freestyle
World Championship Trials (LC)
Bronze medal – third place	2011 Montreal	200 m freestyle

Blake Thomas Worsley (born November 7, 1987, in Vancouver, British Columbia) is a Canadian 2012 Olympic swimmer who competed for the University of Denver, and attended the 2010 Commonwealth Games, where he finished 12th.

Blake Worsley was born (born November 7, 1987, in Vancouver, British Columbia) but grew up in Steam Boat Springs, Colorado. During his intensive training in Canada, he was managed by Head Coach Randy Bennett at Island Swimming in Victoria, Columbia, and after 2009 while he swam as part of the Canadian National Team at major international meets.

== University of Denver ==
He attended and swam for the University of Denver from around 2004 to 2008 where he was trained and competed under Denver head coach Brian Schrader. Schrader played an important role in developing Worsley during his collegiate years of competition. Under Schrader’s direction, Worsley, who was a Sun Belt Conference Male Swimmer of the Year, was Denver's first All-American. As a Denver Junior, Worsley placed 10th in the 500-yard freestyle at the 2008 NCAA Championships in Seattle with a Collegiate record time of 4:17.89.

== 2012 London Olympics ==
Worsley participated in the 2012 Summer Olympics in London for Canada, where he was coached by Canadian Olympic Team Head Coach Randy Bennett. Worsley placed 17th in the 200 meter freestyle, and 14th in the 200 meter freestyle relay.

He competed for Canada at the 2009 World Aquatics Championships and the 2010 Commonwealth Games, where he finished 12th.

== Personal bests and records held ==
Long course (50 m)

Event	Time	Date	Meet	Location	Ref
100 m freestyle	50:23	30 Mar 2012	2012 Canadian Olympic Trials	Montreal, Canada	
200 m freestyle	1:48.14	2012	2012 Olympic Games	London, Great Britain	
400 m freestyle	3:51.86	27 July 2009	2009 World Championships	Rome, Italy	
800 m freestyle	8:10:11	21 Aug 2010	2010 Pan Pacific Championships	Irvine, United States	

Short course (25 m)

Event	Time	Date	Meet	Location	Ref
100 m freestyle	48.33	2009	British Gas Grand Prix	Leeds, Great Britain	
200 m freestyle	1:43.29	2009	British Gas Grand Prix	Leeds, Great Britain	
400 m freestyle	3:41.76	2009	British Gas Grand Prix	Leeds, Great Britain	

Short course (25 y)

Event	Time		Date	Meet	Location	Ref
100 y freestyle	43.73	SR	18 Feb 2009	Sunbelt Conference Championships 2009	Nashville, United States	
200 y freestyle	1:33.40	SR	18 Feb 2009	Sunbelt Conference Championships 2009	Nashville, United States	
500 y freestyle	4:13.81	SR	26 Mar 2009	2009 NCAA Championships	College Station, Texas, United States	

Legend: WR – World record; ER – European record; CR – Commonwealth record; NR – Canadian record;
Records not set in finals: h – heat; sf – semifinal; r – relay 1st leg; rh – relay heat 1st leg; b – B final; † – en route to final mark; so – swim-off; tt – time trial
