= Jean Basson =

South African swimmer (born 1987)

Personal information
- Full name: Jean Basson
- National team: South Africa
- Born: 5 October 1987 (age 38) Johannesburg, South Africa
- Height: 1.85 m (6 ft 1 in)

Sport
- Sport: Swimming
- Strokes: Freestyle
- Club: Tucson Ford Dealers Aquatics
- College team: University of Arizona
Medal record
Men's swimming
Representing South Africa
Commonwealth Games
| Silver medal – second place | 2010 Delhi | 4×100 m medley |
| Bronze medal – third place | 2010 Delhi | 4×200 m freestyle |
All-Africa Games
| Bronze medal – third place | 2011 Maputo | 200m freestyle |

Jean Basson (born 5 October 1987) is an Olympic swimmer from South Africa.

Jean Basson won the gold medal in the 200-meter freestyle at the 2004 African Swimming Championships in Casablanca.

At the 2008 Olympic Games, Basson placed fourth in the 200-metre freestyle final with a time of 1:45.97. He also competed in the 400 m freestyle and the 4 × 200 m relay. At the 2012 Summer Olympics, he took part in the 4 × 200 m relay. Basson lives and trains in Tucson, Arizona, under coach Frank Busch. He attended the University of Arizona, where he was a member of the Arizona Wildcats swimming and diving team.
