= Kledi Kadiu (swimmer) =

Albanian swimmer (born 2003)

Personal information
- Nationality: Albanian
- Born: 28 October 2003 (age 21)

Sport
- Sport: Swimming

Kledi Kadiu (born 28 October 2003) is an Albanian swimmer. He competed in the men's 100 metre freestyle at the 2020 Summer Olympics.
