= Andrew Hunter (British swimmer) =

British swimmer (born 1986)

Personal information
- Full name: Andrew Roy Philip Hunter
- National team: Great Britain; Scotland
- Born: 25 July 1986 (age 39) Halton, England
- Height: 1.90 m (6 ft 3 in)
- Weight: 128 lb (58 kg)

Sport
- Sport: Swimming
- Strokes: Freestyle
- Club: University of Stirling
Medal record
Men's swimming
Representing Great Britain
World Championships (SC)
Silver medal – second place	2008 Manchester	4×200 m freestyle
European Championships (LC)
Silver medal – second place	2006 Budapest	4×200 m freestyle
Universiade
Silver medal – second place	2007 Bangkok	200 m freestyle
Representing Scotland
Commonwealth Games
Silver medal – second place	2006 Melbourne	4×200 m freestyle
Silver medal – second place	2010 Delhi	4×200 m freestyle

Andrew Roy Philip Hunter (born 25 July 1986) is a British former competitive swimmer and freestyler who represented Great Britain at the Olympics, FINA world championships and European championships, and Scotland in the Commonwealth Games.

Hunter trained and studied at Millfield School from 2002 to 2004. At the 2008 Summer Olympics in Beijing, he swam for the British men's team in the 4×200-metre freestyle relay swimming, which came sixth in the event finals.
