= Klavio Meça =

Albanian swimmer (1996–2020)

Personal information
- Nationality: Albanian
- Born: 9 April 1996
- Died: 26 December 2020 (aged 24)

Sport
- Sport: Swimming

Klavio Meça (9 April 1996 – 26 December 2020) was an Albanian swimmer. He competed in the men's 200 metre freestyle event at the 2017 World Aquatics Championships.

He had a number of sporting achievements. In Budapest, Hungary he set a new national record in the 400 m freestyle with a total time of 4:04:03.

Meça died at the age of 24 on 26 December 2020. No cause of death was reported.
