= Nikol Merizaj =

Albanian swimmer (born 1998)

Personal information
- Nationality: Albanian
- Born: 7 August 1998 (age 26); Fier, Albania
- Height: 180 cm (5 ft 11 in)
- Weight: 65 kg (143 lb)

Sport
- Sport: Swimming
- Strokes: Freestyle

Nikol Merizaj (born 7 August 1998) is an Albanian swimmer. She competed in the women's 100 metre freestyle event at the 2016 Summer Olympics where she finished 43rd in the heats and did not advance.

In 2019, she represented Albania at the 2019 World Aquatics Championships held in Gwangju, South Korea. She competed in the women's 50 metre freestyle and women's 100 metre freestyle events. In both events she did not advance to compete in the semi-finals.
