= Noel Borshi =

Albanian swimmer (born 1996)

Personal information
- Nationality: Albania
- Born: 13 February 1996 (age 30) Rome, Italy

Sport
- Sport: Swimming
- Strokes: butterfly
- Club: Te Stela SA

Noel Borshi (born 13 February 1996 in Rome, Italy) is an Albanian swimmer who competed in the 2012 Summer Olympics. She also competed at the 2013 Mediterranean Games, where her best result was tenth place in women's 100 metre butterfly.

== Major results ==
=== Individual ===
==== Long course ====
Year	Competition	Venue	Position	Event	Notes
Representing Albania
2011	World Championships	Shanghai, China	43rd (h)	100 m butterfly	1:05.71
2011	World Championships	Shanghai, China	33rd (h)	200 m butterfly	2:29.16
2012	Olympic Games	(United Kingdom) London, Great Britain	40th (h)	100 m butterfly	1:05.49
2013	Mediterranean Games	Mersin, Turkey	12th (h)	400 m freestyle	4:36.14
2013	Mediterranean Games	Mersin, Turkey	10th (h)	100 m butterfly	1:07.97
2013	World Championships	Barcelona, Spain	46th (h)	100 m butterfly	1:06.77
2014	Youth Olympic Games	Nanjing, China	26th (h)	200 m butterfly	2:23.13
2015	World Championships	Kazan, Russia	49th (h)	100 m butterfly	1:03.65
2015	World Championships	Kazan, Russia	38th (h)	200 m butterfly	2:20.28
2016	European Championships	(United Kingdom) London, Great Britain	37th (h)	100 m butterfly	1:04.67
2016	European Championships	(United Kingdom) London, Great Britain	27th (h)	200 m butterfly	2:23.70
