= Sidni Hoxha =

Albanian swimmer (born 1992)

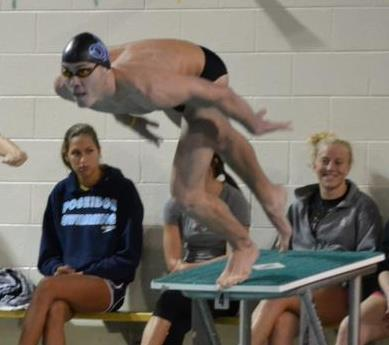
- Sidni Hoxha at CAA Championships

Personal information
- Full name: Sidni Hoxha
- Nickname: "Sid the Kid" "The Albanian Sensation"
- Nationality: Albanian
- Born: 6 January 1992 (age 34) Shkoder, Albania
- Height: 194 cm (6 ft 4 in)
- Weight: 130 kg (287 lb)

Sport
- Sport: Swimming
- Strokes: Freestyle, butterfly
- Club: Tirana Delfina Sport, Illyrian Swimming Association
- College team: Old Dominion University

Sidni Hoxha (born 6 January 1992, in Shkoder) is an Albanian swimmer who participated for the first time in the 2008 Olympic Games in the 50 m freestyle at the age of 16 years. Hoxha swam for Old Dominion University in Virginia, while studying civil engineering. He swam for the Albanian swim club Tirana Defina Sport (TDS), which was initially coached by Dashamir Bregu and later by his father Shpetim Hoxha and Agron Cukja. His grandfather Ismet Hoxha played football for Albania.

== Championship participation ==
=== 2008 ===
At the Beijing Olympics, Hoxha won the second place in his heat (preliminary race) with a time of 24.56 seconds, but did not reach the semifinal with this result, finishing with the 64th-fastest time in the event.

At the 2008 World Short Course Championships, Hoxha was part of the Albanian team that set a new national record in the men's 100 m freestyle relay.

=== 2009 ===
At the European Swimming Championships Short Course in Istanbul 2009, he swam a 22.49 in his 50 m freestyle and mid 50.07 seconds in his 100 m freestyle. Hoxha participated in the 2009 world swimming championships in Rome and swam more than four events in the international swim meet.

European Short Course Championships

At the 2009 European short course championships, he set a new national record in the 25 m freestyle, 50 m butterfly, 50 m backstroke and 100 m medley.

=== 2010 ===
Hoxha, unfortunately, was unable to compete at the Youth Olympics at the last moment due to injury.

=== 2011 ===
In the 2011 2011 World Aquatics Championships in Shanghai, Hoxha once again broke his own national records with swimming a 23.18 for 50 m freestyle and a 51.15 for 100 m freestyle.

=== 2012 ===
Hoxha once again represented Albania in the 2012 Summer Olympics in London. He broke the national record once again in the 100 m freestyle with a time of 51.11.

=== 2013 ===
Hoxha swam in the 2013 NCAA Swimming Championships in Indianapolis, where he swam the 50-yard freestyle and 100-yard freestyle. He swam 19.63 and placed top 18th on the 50 yd freestyle. He placed top 29th in the 100 yd freestyle with a time of 43.48. He also set a new Albanian record in the men's 50 m freestyle.

=== 2014 ===
Hoxha swam in the 2014 NCAA Swimming Championships in Austin, Texas, where he swam the 50 yd freestyle, 100 yd freestyle, and 200 yd freestyle. Hoxha came top 19th in both 50 yd and 100 yd freestyle, missing the semi-finals by 2/100 of a second. Hoxha broke his school record for the 200 yd freestyle with no practice whatsoever for the event.

Hoxha partook once again in the European Championships in Berlin and once again broke the Albanian national record as well as his personal records in the 50 m freestyle and 100 m freestyle.

| Athlete | Event | Rank | | Semifinals | | Final | |
| Athlete | Event | Time | Rank | Time | Rank | Time | Rank |
|---|---|---|---|---|---|---|---|
| Sidni Hoxha | Men's 50 m freestyle | 22.89 | 19 | Top 18th | | | |
| Sidni Hoxha | Men's 100 m freestyle | 50:50 | | did not advance | | | |

Hoxha qualified both of his final times for the 2015 World Championships in Russia and is expected to participate in the World Aquatics Championships.

=== 2015 ===
At the 2015 European Short Course championships, he set new records in the men's 50 and 100 m freestyle.

=== 2016 ===
In Rio, Hoxha competed at his third Olympics, setting a new national record in the men's 50 m freestyle. He Won the 50 and 100 Free at the 2016 Virginia Senior Championships

== Additional information ==
- Hoxha received a Sportsmanship award from Albanian Roots at the Albanian Roots Parade in the Summer of 2013.
- Hoxha is the most successful swimmer in Albanian history and is motivated to participate in two additional Olympic games, making his total involvement to four Olympic games by the age of 28 years. Sidni holds over half of the Albanian swimming records.
- Hoxha is the most successful swimmer in Old Dominion University history.
- Hoxha was the fastest swimmer for the 50 m freestyle, and second-fastest for the 100 m freestyle in the Balkans for the age group 1992–1993, making him a Balkan swimming champion.
- Hoxha has "0.02" tattooed on his forearm as a reminder to work harder. The number represents the number of seconds which he has missed in almost four semi-finals in international tournaments. Coming into 19th place rather than 18th.
- Hoxha is currently working with Beso Buranaj Hoxha and Jon Pepaj in establishing the swimming organization Illyrian Swimming Association, a worldwide swimming society for Albanians.
- Hoxha currently competes for Tide Swimming out of Virginia Beach, VA.
