= List of Malaysian records in athletics =

Athletics records comprise the best performances in the sports of track and field, road running, racewalking and combined events. There are two different kinds of athletics records in Malaysia and certified by the Malaysia Athletics Federation (MAF):

- National record, more commonly referred to in Malaysia as the rekod kebangsaan: the best result recorded anywhere in the world by an athlete or team holding Malaysian citizenship.
- Malaysian All-Comers record: the best result recorded within Malaysia by an athlete or team regardless of nationality.

Key to tables: Awaiting ratification Record not kept by FAA Not ratified or later rescinded by MAF

Legend: h = hand timing; m/s = meter per second; + = en route to a longer distance; A = affected by altitude; OT = oversized track (> 200m in circumference); NWI = no wind information

== Current Malaysian national records ==
=== Outdoor ===
==== Men ====
Event	Record	Athlete	Date	Meet	Place	Age	Ref.
100 m	10.09 A (+0.8 m/s)	Muhd Azeem Fahmi	1 August 2022	World U20 Championships	Cali, Colombia	18 years, 94 days	
100 m	10.0 h (±0.0 m/s)	Watson Nyambek	3 May 1998	Vietnam Open Championships	Hanoi, Vietnam	22 years, 65 days	
200 m	20.73 (+0.2 m/s)	Danish Iftikhar Muhammad Roslee	13 December 2025	SEA Games	Bangkok, Thailand	18 years, 263 days	
200 m	20.7 h	Ramli Ahmad	29 May 1976		Medan, Indonesia	19 years, 230 days	
400 m	45.73	Umar Osman	6 June 2026	New Taipei City Open	Banqiao Stadium, Taiwan	22 years, 299 days	
800 m	1:47.37	Batumalai Rajakumar	26 September 1985	Asian Championships	Jakarta, Indonesia	20 years, 290 days	
1500 m	3:45.70	Mahendran Vadivellan	11 December 2007	Southeast Asian Games	Nakhon Ratchasima, Thailand	21 years, 302 days	
3000 m	8:27.00	Sivalingam Muthiah	18 June 1985		London, United Kingdom	25 years, 126 days	
3000 m	8:15.81	Kristian Tung	20 August 2025	BMC Record Breaker	London, United Kingdom	20 years, 276 days	
5000 m	14:06.84	Ramachandran Murusamy	5 August 1994		Troisdorf, Germany	28 years, 118 days	
5 km (road)	14:43	Kristian Tung	8 February 2024	Armagh International 5K	Armagh, United Kingdom	19 years, 83 days	
10,000 m	29:30.19	Ramachandran Murusamy	27 August 1994	Commonwealth Games	Victoria, Canada	28 years, 140 days	
10 km (road)	31:01	Sanjay Manimaran	24 August 2025	Songkhla Marathon	Songkhla, Thailand	24 years, 51 days	
15 km (road)	47:33+	Prabudass Krishnan	5 May 2021	Hokkaido-Sapporo Marathon Festival	Sapporo, Japan	30 years, 248 days	
20 km (road)	1:03:30+	Prabudass Krishnan	5 May 2021	Hokkaido-Sapporo Marathon Festival	Sapporo, Japan	30 years, 248 days	
Half marathon	1:07:00	Prabudass Krishnan	5 May 2021	Hokkaido-Sapporo Marathon Festival	Sapporo, Japan	30 years, 248 days	
25 km (road)	1:23:35+	Tan Huong Leong	2 December 2018	Fukuoka Marathon	Fukuoka, Japan	30 years, 309 days	
30 km (road)	1:40:26+	Tan Huong Leong	2 December 2018	Fukuoka Marathon	Fukuoka, Japan	30 years, 309 days	
Marathon	2:22:34	Tan Huong Leong	3 December 2023	Fukuoka Marathon	Fukuoka, Japan	35 years, 310 days	
110 m hurdles	13.58 (+1.1 m/s)	Mohamad Armin Zahryl	12 July 2026	Asian U23 Championships	Ordos, China	21 years, 151 days	
400 m hurdles	51.28	Mohd Shahadan Jamaluddin	29 November 2005	Southeast Asian Games	Manila, Philippines	21 years, 299 days	
400 m hurdles	51.26	Fakhrul Afizul Nasir	7 June 2023	Asian U20 Championships	Yecheon, South Korea	19 years, 71 days	
400 m hurdles	51.11	Fakhrul Afizul Nasir	22 August 2024	Sukma Games	Sarawak, Malaysia	20 years, 147 days	
400 m hurdles	50.73	Fakhrul Afizul Nasir	5 June 2026	Kejohanan Olahraga VTF 2	Terengganu, Malaysia	22 years, 69 days	
3000 m steeplechase	8:59.10	Nainasagoram Shanmuganathan	17 September 1998	Commonwealth Games	Kuala Lumpur, Malaysia	22 years, 296 days	
High jump	2.30 m	Nauraj Singh Randhawa	27 April 2017	Singapore Open Championships	Kallang, Singapore	25 years, 90 days	
Pole vault	5.31 m	Mohd Iskandar Alwi	18 March 2018	FTAA All-Comers	Kuala Lumpur, Malaysia	24 years, 20 days	
Long jump	8.02 m (−0.1 m/s)	Andre Anura	7 December 2019	Southeast Asian Games	New Clark City, Philippines	20 years, 178 days	
Triple jump	16.77 m (+0.2 m/s)	Muhammad Hakimi Ismail	23 August 2017	Southeast Asian Games	Kuala Lumpur, Malaysia	26 years, 137 days	
Shot put	19.12 m	Jonah Chang Rigan	30 June 2026	XXXV Qosanov Memorial	Shymkent, Kazakhstan	23 years, 97 days	
Discus throw	62.55 m	Irfan Shamsuddin	25 May 2017	Union Leichtathletik Gala	Linz, Austria	21 years, 282 days	
Hammer throw	68.22 m	Jackie Wong Siew Cheer	18 August 2019	Malaysian Championships	Kajang, Malaysia	27 years, 72 days	
Javelin throw	73.34 m	Mohamed Yazid Imran	2 September 1995		Singapore	29 years, 152 days	
Pentathlon	2657 pts	Pok Chee Sing	1 August 1998		Kuala Lumpur, Malaysia	16 years, 192 days	
Pentathlon	6.39 (long jump), 41.92 (javelin), 24.37 (200 m), 27.01 (discus), 5:15.48 (1500 m)						
Decathlon	7095 pts	Muhammad Malik Ahmad Tobias	7–8 June 2003		Filderstadt, Germany	22 years, 152 days	
Decathlon	100m (wind) / Long jump (wind) / Shot put / High jump / 400m / 110m H (wind) / Discus / Pole vault / Javelin / 1500m; 11.11 / 7.00 m / 14.23 m / 1.94 m / 52.64 / 14.83 / 40.28 m / 4.50 m / 52.21 m / 5:43.28						
10,000 m walk (track)	43:03.24	Rajoo Mogan	10 May 1997		Seremban, Malaysia	22 years, 201 days	
20,000 m walk (track)	1:30:43	Balaisendran Thirukumaran	2 March 1997		Kangar, Malaysia	28 years, 28 days	
10 km walk (road)	42:36	Teoh Boon Lim	11 May 1996	Oder-Neisse Grand Prix	Eisenhüttenstadt, Germany	18 years, 178 days	
20 km walk (road)	1:24:50	Narinder Singh Harbans	19 April 1997		Poděbrady, Czech Republic	21 years, 351 days	
50 km walk (road)	4:10:05	Govindasamy Saravanan	21 September 1998	Commonwealth Games	Kuala Lumpur, Malaysia	28 years, 132 days	
4 × 100 m relay	39.03	Malaysia; Jonathan Nyepa; Danish Iftikhar Muhammad Roslee; Pengiran Aidil Auf Hajam; Aliff Iman Mohd Fahmi	15 December 2025	SEA Games	Bangkok, Thailand	18 years, 263 days	
4 × 400 m relay	3:06.64	Malaysia; Azhar Hashim; Mohd Yazid Parlan; Samson Vellabouy; Nordin Mohamed Jadi	23 October 1991	Asian Championships	Kuala Lumpur, Malaysia	25 years, 163 days 24 years, 222 days 25 years, 281 days 29 years, 164 days	

==== Women ====
Event	Record	Athlete	Date	Meet	Place	Age	Ref.
100 m	11.50 NWI	Shanti Govindasamy	7 May 1993	SEA Pre-Games Championship	Kuala Lumpur, Malaysia	25 years, 230 days	
100 m	11.45 A (+0.4 m/s)	Zaidatul Husniah Zulkifli	8 March 2017	ASA Speed Series 2	Bloemfontein, South Africa	23 years, 200 days	
200 m	23.37 (+1.7 m/s)	Shanti Govindasamy	22 July 1998	Asian Championships	Fukuoka, Japan	30 years, 306 days	
400 m	52.56	Rabia Abdul Salam	1 December 1993	Asian Championships	Manila, Philippines	20 years, 26 days	
400 m	51.80	Shereen Samson Vallabuoy	15 April 2023	Mt. SAC Relays	Walnut, United States	24 years, 279 days	
800 m	2:07.44	Josephine Mary Singarayar	30 September 1986	Asian Games	Seoul, South Korea	19 years, 93 days	
1500 m	4:23.49	Jayanthi Palaniappan	14 September 1993		New Delhi, India	25 years, 164 days	
3000 m	9:18.42	Jayanthi Palaniappan	14 August 1993	World Championships	Stuttgart, Germany	25 years, 133 days	
5000 m	16:18.12	Yuan Yufang	13 October 1997	Southeast Games	Jakarta, Indonesia	21 years, 254 days	
10,000 m	33:50.80	Jayanthi Palaniappan	16 July 1994		Brussels, Belgium	26 years, 104 days	
Half marathon	1:24:44	Sheela Samivellu	7 August 2016	Kuala Lumpur Half Marathon	Kuala Lumpur, Malaysia		
Marathon	2:49:28	Yuan Yufang	30 April 2000	Kuala Lumpur International Marathon	Kuala Lumpur, Malaysia	24 years, 89 days	
100 m hurdles	13.27 (+1.3 m/s)	Moh Siew Wei	11 June 2004		Kassel, Germany	26 years, 42 days	
400 m hurdles	56.02	Noraseela Mohd Khalid	17 June 2006		Regensburg, Germany	26 years, 263 days	
3000 m steeplechase	10:55.31	Melinder Kaur Ragbir Singh	17 June 2010	Sukma Games	Malacca, Malaysia	22 years, 36 days	
High jump	1.83 m	Yap Sean Yee	24 August 2017	Southeast Asian Games	Kuala Lumpur, Malaysia	22 years, 231 days	
Pole vault	4.40 m	Roslinda Samsu	10 July 2006		Mataró, Spain	24 years, 31 days	
Long jump	6.29 m	Noor Amira Mohamad Nafiah	15 December 2014		Palembang, Indonesia	25 years, 152 days	
Long jump	6.29 m (+1.2 m/s)	Noor Amira Mohamad Nafiah	3 June 2015	Asian Championships	Wuhan, China	25 years, 322 days	
Triple jump	13.90 m (+0.1 m/s)	Noor Amira Mohamad Nafiah	6 October 2012	Malaysia Open Championships	Kuala Lumpur, Malaysia	23 years, 82 days	
Shot put	14.41 m	Lee Chiew Har	15 July 1989		Kuala Lumpur, Malaysia	26 years, 268 days	
Shot put	14.69 m	Nani Sahirah Maryata	23 March 2023	ICTSI Open Championships	Ilagan, Philippines		
Shot put	15.22 m	Nani Sahirah Maryata	29 April 2023	Perak Open Meeting	Ipoh, Malaysia		
Discus throw	52.36 m	Queenie Ting Kung Ni	16 May 2022	Southeast Asian Games	Hanoi, Vietnam	24 years, 182 days	
Hammer throw	62.48 m	Grace Wong Xiu Mei	10 April 2021		Bukit Jalil, Malaysia	21 years, 82 days	
Javelin throw	49.34 m	Siti Nur Nadiah Othman	8 May 2014	Thailand Open Championships	Bangkok, Thailand	21 years, 72 days	
Heptathlon	5247 pts	Norliyana Kamaruddin	24–25 August 2017	Southeast Asian Games	Kuala Lumpur, Malaysia	26 years, 152 days	
Heptathlon	100m H (wind) / High jump / Shot put / 200m (wind) / Long jump (wind) / Javelin / 800m; 15.03 (−0.2 m/s) / 1.80 m / 11.36 m / 26.55 (±0.0 m/s) / 5.59 m (±0.0 m/s) / 34.50 m / 2:23.67						
Heptathlon	5262 pts h NWI	Norliyana Kamaruddin	16–17 May 2022	Southeast Asian Games	Hanoi, Vietnam	31 years, 51 days	
Heptathlon	100m H (wind) / High jump / Shot put / 200m (wind) / Long jump (wind) / Javelin / 800m; 14.89 (+0.7 m/s) / 1.80 m / 11.74 m / 26.2 h (NWI) / 5.64 m (NWI) / 32.76 m / 2:25.15						
5000 m walk (track)	21:30.9 h	Yuan Yufang	8 March 1998		Kuala Lumpur, Malaysia	22 years, 35 days	
10,000 m walk (track)	45:22.05	Yuan Yufang	9 August 1999	Southeast Asian Games	Bandar Seri Begawan, Brunei	23 years, 189 days	
20,000 m walk (track)	1:39:58	Yuan Yufang	4 April 1999		Kuala Lumpur, Malaysia	23 years, 62 days	
10 km walk (road)	43:25	Yuan Yufang	9 May 1998		Eisenhüttenstadt, Germany	22 years, 97 days	
20 km walk (road)	1:32:25	Yuan Yufang	23 September 2003	Asian Championships	Manila, Philippines	27 years, 234 days	
50 km walk (road)	4:51:32	Norliana Mohd Rusni	6 December 2014		Seremban, Malaysia	25 years, 41 days	
4 × 100 m relay	45.18	Malaysia; Nurul Faizah Asma; Siti Fatimah; Komalam Shally; Zaidatul Husniah Zulkifli	8 July 2017	Asian Championships	Bhubasneswar, India	26 years, 4 days 31 years, 105 days 29 years, 76 days 23 years, 322 days	
4 × 100 m relay	44.58	Malaysia; Azreen Nabila Alias; Zaidatul Husniah Zulkifli; Nur Afrina Batrisyia Mohamad Rizal; Nor Aishah Rofina Aling	10 May 2023	Southeast Asian Games	Phnom Penh, Cambodia	22 years, 315 days 29 years, 263 days 18 years, 232 days 24 years, 99 days	
4 × 400 m relay	3:35.83	Malaysia; Shanti Ramachandran; Josephine Mary Singarayar; Shanti Govindasamy; Rabia Abdul Salam	17 June 1993	Southeast Asian Games	Singapore	20 years, 70 days 25 years, 353 days 25 years, 271 days 19 years, 224 days	

==== Mixed ====
Event	Record	Athlete	Date	Meet	Place	Age	Ref.
4 × 400 m relay	3:31.25	Malaysia; Abdul Wafiy Roslan; Chelsea Cassiopea Evali Bopulas; Umar Osman; Zaimah Atifah Zainuddin	8 May 2023	Southeast Asian Games	Phnom Penh, Cambodia	24 years, 18 days 23 years, 4 days 19 years, 270 days 23 years, 240 days	

=== Indoor ===
==== Men ====
Event	Record	Athlete	Date	Meet	Place	Age	Ref.
60 m	6.56	Muhd Azeem Fahmi	1 March 2025	SEC Championships	College Station, United States	20 years, 306 days	
200 m	22.86	Timothy Tan	27 November 2019		Manchester, United Kingdom		
400 m	48.43	Mohd Zaiful Zainal Abidin	15 February 2008	Asian Championships	Doha, Qatar	25 years, 234 days	
800 m	1:55.49	Jayakumar Dewarajoo	11 February 2006	Asian Championships	Pattaya, Thailand	23 years, 210 days	
1500 m	4:16.54	Mohd Jironi Riduan	26 February 2010	Asian Championships	Tehran, Iran	23 years, 177 days	
1500 m	4:05.09	Rikigoro Shinozuka	27 January 2024	McGill Team Challenge	Montreal, Canada		
3000 m	9:06.58	Rajendran Venugopal	12 February 2009		Tehran, Iran	22 years, 4 days	
3000 m	8:34.02	Kristian Tung	7 January 2024	BMC Sheffield Grand Prix	Sheffield, United Kingdom	19 years, 51 days	
5000 m	15:28.30 OT	Woo Chan Yew	21 January 2012	Iowa State Open	Ames, United States	31 years, 109 days	
60 m hurdles	7.88	Mohamad Armin Zahryl	7 February 2026	Asian Championships	Tianjin, China	20 years, 361 days	
High jump	2.27 m	Nauraj Singh Randhawa	30 January 2022	Hvězdy v Nehvizdech	Nehvizdy, Czech Republic	30 years, 3 days	
Pole vault	5.20 m	Mohd Iskandar Alwi	22 March 2017		Caotun, Chinese Taipei	23 years, 24 days	
Long jump	7.33 m	Mohd Syahrul Amri Suhaimi	10 February 2006	Asian Championships	Pattaya, Thailand	22 years, 161 days	
Triple jump	16.00 m	Muhammad Hakimi Ismail	16 February 2014	Asian Championships	Hangzhou, China	22 years, 314 days	
Shot put	16.67 m	Adi Alifuddin Hussin	25 February 2010	Asian Championships	Tehran, Iran	21 years, 174 days	
Heptathlon							
Heptathlon	100m H (wind) / High jump / Shot put / 200m (wind) / Long jump (wind) / Javelin / 800m						
5000 m walk	23:42.44	Mohd Sharrulhaizy Abdul Rahman	8 February 2004	Asian Championships	Tehran, Iran	23 years, 51 days	
4 × 400 m relay							

==== Women ====
Event	Record	Athlete	Date	Meet	Place	Age	Ref.
60 m	7.56	Siti Fatima Mohamad	3 March 2019		Tehran, Iran	32 years, 343 days	
200 m	24.34	Shanti Govindasamy	13 March 1993	World Championships	Toronto, Canada	25 years, 175 days	
400 m	54.58	Noraseela Mohd Khalid	12 February 2006		Leipzig, Germany	26 years, 138 days	
400 m	53.79	Shereen Vallabouy	12 March 2022	NCAA Division II Championships	Pittsburg, United States	24 years, 156 days	
800 m	2:12.45	Noraseela Mohd Khalid	23 January 2005		Chemnitz, Germany	25 years, 118 days	
1500 m							
3000 m							
60 m hurdles	8.38	Moh Siew Wei	30 January 2005	BW-Bank Meeting	Karlsruhe, Germany	26 years, 275 days	
High jump	1.70 m	Yap Sean Yee	21 February 2016	Asian Championships	Doha, Qatar	21 years, 47 days	
Pole vault	4.23 m	Roslinda Samsu	14 March 2008		Tsaotun, Chinese Taipei	25 years, 279 days	
Long jump	5.89 m	Noor Nadia Shahidatun	18 February 2017		Oskemen, Kazakhstan	20 years, 258 days	
Triple jump	13.03 m	Kirthana Ramasamy	18 February 2017		Oskemen, Kazakhstan	20 years, 29 days	
Shot put							
Pentathlon							
Pentathlon	60m H / High jump / Shot put / Long jump / 800m						
3000 m walk	20:05.36	Lee Shew Keng	26 March 2014	World Masters Championships	Budapest, Hungary		
4 × 400 m relay							

=== Under-23 ===
National under-23 records in athletics comprise the best performance of an athlete before the year of their 23rd birthday. Technically, in all under-23 athletics age divisions, the age is calculated "on December 31 of the year of competition" to avoid age group switching during a competitive season.

==== Men ====
Event	Record	Athlete	Date	Meet	Place	Age	Ref.
100 m	10.09 (+0.8 m/s)	Muhd Azeem Fahmi	1 August 2022	World U20 Championships	Cali, Colombia	18 years, 94 days	
100 m	10.0 h	Watson Nyambek	3 May 1998	Vietnam Open Championships	Hanoi, Vietnam	22 years, 65 days	
200 m	20.73 (+0.2 m/s)	Danish Iftikhar Muhammad Roslee	13 December 2025	SEA Games	Bangkok, Thailand	18 years, 263 days	
200 m	20.7 h	Ramli Ahmad	29 May 1976		Medan, Indonesia	19 years, 230 days	
400 m	46.09	Umar Osman	2 August 2023	Summer World University Games	Chengdu, China	19 years, 356 days	
800 m	1:47.37	Batumalai Rajakumar	26 September 1985	Asian Championships	Jakarta, Indonesia	20 years, 290 days	
1500 m	3:45.70	Mahendran Vadivellan	11 December 2007	Southeast Asian Games	Nakhon Ratchasima, Thailand	21 years, 302 days	
3000 m	8:15.81	Kristian Tung	20 August 2025	BMC Record Breaker	London, United Kingdom	20 years, 276 days	
5 km (road)	14:43	Kristian Tung	8 February 2024	Armagh International 5K	Armagh, United Kingdom	19 years, 83 days	
100 m hurdles	13.58 (+1.1 m/s)	Mohamad Armin Zahryl	12 July 2026	Asian U23 Championships	Ordos, China	21 years, 151 days	
400 m hurdles	51.26	Fakhrul Afizul Nasir	7 June 2023	Asian U20 Championships	Yecheon, South Korea	19 years, 71 days	
400 m hurdles	51.11	Fakhrul Afizul Nasir	22 August 2024	Sukma Games	Sarawak, Malaysia	20 years, 147 days	
3000 m steeplechase	8:59.10	Nainasagoram Shanmuganathan	17 September 1998	Commonwealth Games	Kuala Lumpur, Malaysia	22 years, 296 days	
Pole vault	5.20 m	Mohd Iskandar Alwi	22 May 2015	International Pole Vault Meeting	Busan, South Korea	21 years, 85 days	
Shot put	17.67 m	Jonah Chang Rigan	24 October 2023	Mokpo International Championships	Mokpo, South Korea	20 years, 213 days	
Discus throw	62.55 m	Muhammad Irfan Shamsuddin	25 May 2017	Union Leichtathletik Gala	Linz, Austria	21 years, 282 days	
Pentathlon	2657 pts	Pok Chee Sing	1 August 1998		Kuala Lumpur, Malaysia	16 years, 192 days	
Pentathlon	6.39 (long jump), 41.92 (javelin), 24.37 (200 m), 27.01 (discus), 5:15.48 (1500 m)						
Decathlon	7095 pts	Muhammad Malik Ahmad Tobias	7–8 June 2003		Filderstadt, Germany	22 years, 152 days	
Decathlon	100m (wind) / Long jump (wind) / Shot put / High jump / 400m / 110m H (wind) / Discus / Pole vault / Javelin / 1500m; 11.11 / 7.00 m / 14.23 m / 1.94 m / 52.64 / 14.83 / 40.28 m / 4.50 m / 52.21 m / 5:43.28						
10,000 m walk (track)	43:03.24	Rajoo Mogan	10 May 1997		Seremban, Malaysia	22 years, 201 days	
10 km walk (road)	42:36	Teoh Boon Lim	11 May 1996	Oder-Neisse Grand Prix	Eisenhüttenstadt, Germany	18 years, 178 days	
20 km walk (road)	1:24:50	Narinder Singh Harbans	19 April 1997		Poděbrady, Czech Republic	21 years, 351 days	
4 × 100 m relay	39.62	Malaysia; Muhammad Haikal Hanafi; Jonathan Nyepa; Badrul Hisham Abdul Manap; Khairul Hafiz Jantan	27 July 2017	Vietnam Open	Ho Chi Minh City, Vietnam	18 years, 89 days 21 years, 123 days 20 years, 206 days 19 years, 5 days	

==== Women ====
Event	Record	Athlete	Date	Meet	Place	Age	Ref.
400 m	52.56	Rabia Abdul Salam	3 December 1993	Asian Championships	Manila, Philippines	20 years, 28 days	
800 m	2:07.44	Josephine Mary Singarayar	30 September 1986	Asian Games	Seoul, South Korea	19 years, 93 days	
5000 m	16:18.12	Yuan Yufang	13 October 1997	Southeast Games	Jakarta, Indonesia	21 years, 254 days	
3000 m steeplechase	10:55.31	Melinder Kaur Ragbir Singh	17 June 2010	Sukma Games	Malacca, Malaysia	22 years, 36 days	
High jump	1.79 m	Yap Sean Yee	25 April 2015	Pahang Open Championships	Pahang, Malaysia	20 years, 110 days	
Hammer throw	62.48 m	Grace Wong Xiu Mei	10 April 2021		Bukit Jalil, Malaysia	21 years, 82 days	
Javelin throw	49.34 m	Siti Nur Nadiah Othman	8 May 2014	Thailand Open Championships	Bangkok, Thailand	21 years, 72 days	
Heptathlon	5175 pts	Zaiton Othman	10–11 December 1981	Southeast Asian Games	Manila, Philippines	22 years, 222 days	
Heptathlon	100m H (wind) / High jump / Shot put / 200m (wind) / Long jump (wind) / Javelin / 800m; 14.70 / 1.67 m / 9.39 m / 25.96 / 5.58 m / 40.80 m / 2:23.26						
5000 m walk (track)	21:30.9	Yuan Yufang	8 March 1998		Kuala Lumpur, Malaysia	22 years, 35 days	
10 km walk (road)	43:25	Yuan Yufang	9 May 1998		Eisenhüttenstadt, Germany	22 years, 97 days	

=== Junior (under-20) ===
National junior records in athletics comprise the best performance of an athlete before the year of their 20th birthday. Technically, in all under 20 age divisions, the age is calculated "on December 31 of the year of competition" to avoid age group switching during a competitive season.

==== Men ====
Event	Record	Athlete	Date	Meet	Place	Age	Ref.
100 m	10.09 A (+0.8 m/s)	Muhd Azeem Fahmi	1 August 2022	World U20 Championships	Cali, Colombia	18 years, 94 days	
200 m	20.73 (+0.2 m/s)	Danish Iftikhar Muhammad Roslee	13 December 2025	SEA Games	Bangkok, Thailand	18 years, 263 days	
400 m	46.41	Mohd Zaiful Zainal Abidin	20 July 2001	Asian Junior Championships	Bandar Seri Begawan, Brunei	19 years, 24 days	
800 m	1:49.31	Batumalai Rajakumar	4 June 1983	Southeast Asian Games	Singapore	18 years, 176 days	
1500 m	3:50.13	Batumalai Rajakumar	1 June 1983	Southeast Asian Games	Singapore	18 years, 173 days	
3000 m	8:37.64	Kristian Tung	9 August 2023	Watford Harriers Open Graded Meeting	Watford, United Kingdom	18 years, 265 days	
5000 m	15:00.69	Kristian Tung	12 July 2023	BMC Gold Standard Races	Birmingham, United Kingdom	18 years, 237 days	
5 km (road)	14:43	Kristian Tung	8 February 2024	Armagh International 5K	Armagh, United Kingdom	19 years, 83 days	
10,000 m	31:41.6 h	Mahendran Vadivellan	17 July 2005		Ipoh, Malaysia	18 years, 296 days	
110 m hurdles (99/100 cm)	13.84	Rayzam Shah Wan Sofian	18 July 2006		Macau	18 years, 188 days	
110 m hurdles (106.7 cm)	13.91	Rayzam Shah Wan Sofian	10 December 2007	Southeast Asian Games	Nakhon Ratchasima, Thailand	19 years, 333 days	
400 m hurdles	51.26	Fakhrul Afizul Nasir	7 June 2023	Asian U20 Championships	Yecheon, South Korea	19 years, 71 days	
2000 m steeplechase	6:04.44	Saranraj Sivamani	30 June 2012		Sidoarjo, Indonesia	17 years, 132 days	
3000 m steeplechase	9:25.1 h	Rajan Suppiah	16 November 1988	Sukma Games	Bangi, Malaysia	18 years, 35 days	
High jump	2.20 m	Lee Hup Wei	26 September 2005		Seremban, Malaysia	18 years, 144 days	
Pole vault	5.10 m	Mohd Iskandar Alwi	16 December 2013	Southeast Asian Games	Naypyidaw, Myanmar	19 years, 293 days	
Long jump	7.46 m	Pang Li Chong	16 October 2011		Ipoh, Malaysia	19 years, 156 days	
Triple jump	15.80 m	Muhammad Hakimi Ismail	9 May 2009		Penang, Malaysia	18 years, 31 days	
Shot put (6 kg)	19.41 m	Jonah Chang Rigan	3 June 2022	13th International Sparkassenmeeting	Osterode, Germany	19 years, 70 days	
Shot put (7.26 kg)	16.09 m	Adi Alifuddin Hussin	25 April 2007		Hanoi, Vietnam	18 years, 233 days	
Discus throw (1.75 kg)	46.85 m	Adi Alifuddin Hussin	28 July 2006		Chiang Mai, Thailand	17 years, 327 days	
Discus throw (2 kg)	53.16 m	Muhammad Irfan Shamsuddin	15 December 2013	Southeast Asian Games	Naypyidaw, Myanmar	18 years, 121 days	
Discus throw	54.26 m	Muhammad Irfan Shamsuddin	31 May 2014	Sukma Games	Kangar, Malaysia	18 years, 288 days	
Hammer throw (5 kg)	68.64 m	Jackie Wong Siew Cheer	17 July 2010		Kuala Lumpur, Malaysia	18 years, 40 days	
Hammer throw (6 kg)	61.08 m	Jackie Wong Siew Cheer	1 July 2010		Hanoi, Vietnam	18 years, 24 days	
Hammer throw (7.26 kg)	58.30 m	Jackie Wong Siew Cheer	31 July 2011		Kuala Lumpur, Malaysia	19 years, 54 days	
Javelin throw (800 g)	62.90 m	Kho Mei Kwang	24 May 1999		Darwin, Australia	18 years, 278 days	
Decathlon	6584 pts	Sazali Sahar	12–13 June 2004	Asian Junior Championships	Ipoh, Malaysia	19 years, 43 days	
Decathlon	100m (wind) / Long jump (wind) / Shot put / High jump / 400m / 110m H (wind) / Discus / Pole vault / Javelin / 1500m; 11.59 / 6.73 m / 12.81 m / 1.96 m / 54.12 / 15.96 / 40.82 m / 3.80 m / 50.90 m / 5:18.18						
Decathlon	6989 pts #	Muhammad Malik Ahmad Tobias	8–9 August 1999	Southeast Asian Games	Bandar Seri Begawan, Brunei	18 years, 214 days	
Decathlon	100m (wind) / Long jump (wind) / Shot put / High jump / 400m / 110m H (wind) / Discus / Pole vault / Javelin / 1500m; 11.53 / 7.21 m / 13.57 m / 2.05 m / 54.18 / 15.24 / 39.53 m / 4.60 m / 53.10 m / 5:52.78						
10,000 m walk (track)	43:40.26	Ng Chee Seng	19 August 1996		Kangar, Malaysia	18 years, 279 days	
10 km walk (road)	42:36.00	Teoh Boon Lim	11 May 1996	Oder-Neisse Grand Prix	Eisenhüttenstadt, Germany	18 years, 178 days	
20,000 m walk (track)	1:33:32	Mohd Sharrulhaizy Abdul Rahman	8 May 1999		Seremban, Malaysia	18 years, 140 days	
4 × 100 m relay	39.86	Malaysia; Haiqal Hanafi; Badrul Hisyam Abdul Manap; Asnawi Hashim; Khairul Hafiz Jantan	26 November 2015	ASEAN School Games	Bandar Seri Begawan, Brunei	16 years, 211 days 18 years, 328 days 17 years, 312 days 17 years, 127 days	
4 × 100 m relay	3:12.45	Malaysia; Patrick Khoo Ghee Wong; Edward Jaipal; John Petruse; Sean Paul	11 September 1988		Singapore	16 years, 244 days 19 years, 91 days ? ?	

==== Women ====
Event	Record	Athlete	Date	Meet	Place	Age	Ref.
100 m	11.86	Zaidatul Husna Zulkifli	5 May 2012		Seremban, Malaysia	18 years, 259 days	
100 m	11.6 h	Petra Nabila Mustafa	10 September 2002	Sukma Games	Kota Kinabalu, Malaysia	16 years, 247 days	
200 m	24.21	Mumtaz Jaafar	11 December 1981	Southeast Asian Games	Manila, Philippines	19 years, 315 days	
400 m	53.85	Josephine Mary Singarayar	16 August 1986		Singapore	19 years, 48 days	
800 m	2:07.44	Josephine Mary Singarayar	30 September 1986	Asian Games	Seoul, South Korea	19 years, 93 days	
1500 m	4:40.8 h	Rajakumari Periasamy	27 March 1985		Bandar Seri Begawan, Brunei	18 years, 124 days	
3000 m	10:11.25	Rajakumari Periasamy	26 March 1985		Bandar Seri Begawan, Brunei	18 years, 123 days	
5000 m	18:30.16	Linda Chin Hui Ching	20 July 1990	Sukma Games	Kuching, Malaysia	15 years, 271 days	
10,000 m	45:21.3 h	Amutha Arumugam	6 September 1999		Kluang, Malaysia	19 years, 84 days	
100 m hurdles	14.31	Azizah Ibrahim	27 April 2006		Hanoi, Vietnam	18 years, 218 days	
100 m hurdles	14.15 #	Moh Siew Wei	25 April 1998	Sukma Games	Shah Alam, Malaysia	19 years, 360 days	
400 m hurdles	61.49	Norisah Kassim	6 June 2008	Sukma Games	Kuala Terengganu, Malaysia	17 years, 204 days	
2000 m steeplechase	7:20.31	Nik Norzilawatie Nik Wil	28 April 2012		Singapore	17 years, 43 days	
3000 m steeplechase	12:03.74	Melinder Kaur Ragbir Singh	1 June 2006	Sukma Games	Alor Setar, Malaysia	18 years, 20 days	
High jump	1.78 m	Yap Sean Yee	27 June 2013		Hanoi, Vietnam	18 years, 173 days	
Pole vault	3.90 m	Roslinda Samsu	18 March 2001		Kuala Lumpur, Malaysia	18 years, 282 days	
Long jump	6.20 m	Ngew Sin Mei	10 September 2002	Sukma Games	Kota Kinabalu, Malaysia	19 years, 98 days	
Triple jump	13.31 m (nw)	Kirthana Ramasamy	28 July 2016	Sukma Games	Kuching, Malaysia	19 years, 190 days	
Shot put	13.03 m	Lee Chiew Har	27 September 1981		Perth, Australia	18 years, 342 days	
Discus throw	42.79 m	Yap Jeng Tzan	21 September 2006		Penang, Malaysia	19 years, 255 days	
Hammer throw	60.99 m	Grace Wong Xiu Mei	7 April 2017		Mokpo, South Korea	17 years, 79 days	
Javelin throw	44.28 m	Siti Nur Nadiah Othman	12 July 2012	Sukma Games	Kuantan, Malaysia	19 years, 138 days	
Heptathlon	4325 pts	Chuling Attay	27–28 May 2005		Kuala Lumpur, Malaysia	18 years, 246 days	
Heptathlon	100m H (wind) / High jump / Shot put / 200m (wind) / Long jump (wind) / Javelin / 800m; 15.60 / 1.67 m / 8.25 m / 27.12 / 5.55 m / 23.83 m / 2:42.02						
3000 m walk (track)	14:31.32	Nur Aisyah Ahmat	18 July 2010		Kuala Lumpur, Malaysia	15 years, 302 days	
5000 m walk (track)	25:02.93	Elena Goh Ling Yin	22 April 2013		Kuala Lumpur, Malaysia	16 years, 358 days	
10,000 m walk (track)	53:12.43	Foo Chee Yean	23 September 2005		Penang, Malaysia	19 years, 186 days	
10 km walk (road)	52:15+	Elena Goh Ling Yin	10 March 2013	Asian Race Walking Championships	Nomi, Japan	16 years, 315 days	
20,000 m walk (track)	1:52:48	Elena Goh Ling Yin	12 May 2012		Kuala Lumpur, Malaysia	16 years, 13 days	
20 km walk (road)	1:51:24	Elena Goh Ling Yin	10 March 2013	Asian Race Walking Championships	Nomi, Japan	16 years, 315 days	
4 × 100 m relay	47.28	Malaysia ? ? ? ? ?	26 June 2002		Bandar Seri Begawan, Brunei	? ? ? ?	
4 × 400 m relay	3:50.15	Malaysia; Vani Ramasamy; Anita Kumari Kumaran; Rasidah Othman; Manimagalay Nadarajah	7 May 1995		Ipoh, Malaysia	16 years, 95 days 18 years, 180 days ? 19 years, 99 days	

=== Youth (under-18) ===
Malaysian youth bests in the sport of athletics are the all-time best marks set in competition by aged 17 or younger throughout the entire calendar year of the performance and competing as Malaysian citizen. MAF doesn't maintain an official list for such performances. All bests shown on this list are tracked by statisticians not officially sanctioned by the governing body.

==== Boys ====
Event	Record	Athlete	Date	Meet	Place	Age	Ref.
100 m	10.57	Rayzam Shah Wan Sofian	2006	MSSM	Penang, Malaysia	17 years, 355 days	
200 m	21.04 (+1.1 m/s)	Muhd Azeem Fahmi	22 February 2020	Perak All Comers	Ipoh, Malaysia	15 years, 299 days	
200 m	20.94 (+0.4 m/s)	Muhammad Sayyid Amin	23 October 2024	MSSM	Ipoh, Malaysia	17 years, 279 days	
400 m	47.50	Mohd Zaiful Z. Abidin	1999	MSSM	K. Kinabalu, Sabah		
800 m	1:53.66	Nik Hafiz bin Nik Mohamad	2009	MSSM	Kuala Lumpur, Malaysia		
1500 m	3:58.02	Balu A/l Muniandy	2005	MSSM	Penang, Malaysia		
5000 m	15:39.2	Vignesvaran Jaykumar	1998	MSSM	Ipoh, Malaysia		
2000 m steeplechase	6:04.44	Saranraj Sivamani	30 June 2012		Sidoarjo, Indonesia	17 years, 132 days	
Shot put (6 kg)							
Discus throw (1.75 kg)	39.63 m	Mohamad Hisham Hashim	12 March 2016	MSST	Kemaman, Malaysia	14 years, 203 days	

==== Girls ====
Event	Record	Athlete	Date	Meet	Place	Age	Ref.
100 m	11.6 h	Petra Nabila Mustafa	10 September 2002	Sukma Games	Kota Kinabalu, Malaysia	16 years, 247 days	
200 m	24.37	Petra Nabila Mustafa	10 September 2002	Sukma Games	Kota Kinabalu, Malaysia	16 years, 247 days	
400 m	54.26	Shereen Samson Vallabouy	12 June 2015	Southeast Asian Games	Kallang, Singapore	16 years, 337 days	
5000 m	18:30.16	Linda Chin Hui Ching	20 July 1990		Kuching, Malaysia	15 years, 271 days	
400 m hurdles							
2000 m steeplechase	7:20.31	Nik Norzilawatie Nik Wil	28 April 2012		Singapore	17 years, 43 days	
Pole vault	3.75 m	Roslinda Samsu	3 June 2000	Sukma Games	Penang, Malaysia	17 years, 360 days	
Hammer throw	60.99 m	Grace Wong Xiu Mei	7 April 2017		Mokpo, South Korea	17 years, 79 days	
3000 m walk (track)	14:31.32	Nur Aisyah Ahmat	18 July 2010		Kuala Lumpur, Malaysia	15 years, 302 days	
5000 m walk (track)	25:02.93	Elena Goh Ling Yin	22 April 2013		Kuala Lumpur, Malaysia	16 years, 358 days	
10 km walk (road)	52:15+	Elena Goh Ling Yin	10 March 2013	Asian Race Walking Championships	Nomi, Japan	16 years, 315 days	
20,000 m walk (track)	1:52:48	Elena Goh Ling Yin	12 May 2012		Kuala Lumpur, Malaysia	16 years, 13 days	
20 km walk (road)	1:51:24	Elena Goh Ling Yin	10 March 2013	Asian Race Walking Championships	Nomi, Japan	16 years, 315 days	

== Current Malaysian All-Comers records ==
=== Men ===
Event	Record	Athlete	Date	Meet	Place	Age	Ref.
100 m	9.88 (−0.1 m/s)	Ato Boldon (TRI)	17 September 1998	Commonwealth Games	Kuala Lumpur, Malaysia	24 years, 261 days	
200 m	20.18 (−0.2 m/s)	Julian Golding (ENG)	19 September 1998	Commonwealth Games	Kuala Lumpur, Malaysia	23 years, 214 days	
400 m	44.52	Iwan Thomas (WAL)	18 September 1998	Commonwealth Games	Kuala Lumpur, Malaysia	24 years, 256 days	
800 m	1:43.82	Japheth Kimutai (KEN)	19 September 1998	Commonwealth Games	Kuala Lumpur, Malaysia	19 years, 273 days	
1500 m	3:39.49	Laban Rotich (KEN)	21 September 1998	Commonwealth Games	Kuala Lumpur, Malaysia	29 years, 244 days	
5000 m	13:22.57	Daniel Komen (KEN)	19 September 1998	Commonwealth Games	Kuala Lumpur, Malaysia	22 years, 125 days	
10,000 m	28:10.00	Simon Maina (KEN)	16 September 1998	Commonwealth Games	Kuala Lumpur, Malaysia	20 years, 182 days	
Marathon	2:14:46	Kennedy Kiproo Lilan (KEN)	24 June 2012	Kuala Lumpur Marathon	Kuala Lumpur, Malaysia	25 years, 165 days	
110 m hurdles	13.32 (−0.2 m/s)	Tony Jarrett (ENG)	19 September 1998	Commonwealth Games	Kuala Lumpur, Malaysia	30 years, 37 days	
400 m hurdles	48.28	Dinsdale Morgan (JAM)	19 September 1998	Commonwealth Games	Kuala Lumpur, Malaysia	25 years, 304 days	
3000 m steeplechase	8:15.34	John Kosgei (KEN)	17 September 1998	Commonwealth Games	Kuala Lumpur, Malaysia	25 years, 64 days	
High jump	2.31 m	Dalton Grant (ENG)	19 September 1998	Commonwealth Games	Kuala Lumpur, Malaysia	32 years, 164 days	
Pole vault	5.60 m	Riaan Botha (RSA)	20 September 1998	Commonwealth Games	Kuala Lumpur, Malaysia	27 years, 316 days	
Long jump	8.22 m (−0.9 m/s)	Peter Burge (AUS)	20 September 1998	Commonwealth Games	Kuala Lumpur, Malaysia	24 years, 79 days	
Triple jump	17.22 m (−1.0 m/s)	Chen Yanping (CHN)	23 October 1991	Asian Championships	Kuala Lumpur, Malaysia	25 years, 279 days	
Shot put	20.01 m	Burger Lambrechts (RSA)	21 September 1998	Commonwealth Games	Kuala Lumpur, Malaysia	25 years, 171 days	
Discus throw	64.42 m	Robert Weir (ENG)	17 September 1998	Commonwealth Games	Kuala Lumpur, Malaysia	37 years, 225 days	
Hammer throw	74.71 m	Stuart Rendell (AUS)	17 September 1998	Commonwealth Games	Kuala Lumpur, Malaysia	26 years, 79 days	
Javelin throw	88.75 m	Marius Corbett (RSA)	21 September 1998	Commonwealth Games	Kuala Lumpur, Malaysia	22 years, 360 days	
Decathlon	8490 pts	Jagan Hames (AUS)	17–18 September 1998	Commonwealth Games	Kuala Lumpur, Malaysia	22 years, 322 days	
Decathlon	100m (wind) / Long jump (wind) / Shot put / High jump / 400m / 110m H (wind) / Discus / Pole vault / Javelin / 1500m; 10.77 / 7.64 m (+0.8 m/s) / 14.73 m / 2.19 m / 49.67 / 14.07 (+0.4 m/s) / 46.40 m / 5.00 m / 64.67 m / 5:02.68						
20 km walk (road)	1:24:59	Nicholas A'Hern (AUS)	17 September 1998	Commonwealth Games	Kuala Lumpur, Malaysia	29 years, 254 days	
50 km walk (road)	4:10:05	Govindasamy Saravanan (MAS)	21 September 1998	Commonwealth Games	Kuala Lumpur, Malaysia	28 years, 132 days	
4 × 100 m relay	38.20	England; Dwain Chambers; Marlon Devonish; Julian Golding; Darren Campbell	21 September 1998	Commonwealth Games	Kuala Lumpur, Malaysia	20 years, 169 days 22 years, 112 days 23 years, 216 days 25 years, 9 days	
4 × 400 m relay	2:59.03	Jamaica; Michael McDonald; Roxbert Martin; Greg Haughton; Davian Clarke	21 September 1998	Commonwealth Games	Kuala Lumpur, Malaysia	23 years, 188 days 28 years, 320 days 24 years, 315 days 22 years, 144 days	

=== Women ===
Event	Record	Athlete	Date	Meet	Place	Age	Ref.
100 m	11.06 (−0.3 m/s)	Chandra Sturrup (BAH)	17 September 1998	Commonwealth Games	Kuala Lumpur, Malaysia	27 years, 5 days	
200 m	22.77 (+0.1 m/s)	Nova Maree Peris-Kneebone (AUS)	19 September 1998	Commonwealth Games	Kuala Lumpur, Malaysia	27 years, 206 days	
400 m	50.17	Sandie Richards (JAM)	18 September 1998	Commonwealth Games	Kuala Lumpur, Malaysia	29 years, 316 days	
800 m	1:57.60	Maria Mutola (MOZ)	19 September 1998	Commonwealth Games	Kuala Lumpur, Malaysia	25 years, 327 days	
1500 m	4:05.27	Jackline Maranga (KEN)	21 September 1998	Commonwealth Games	Kuala Lumpur, Malaysia	20 years, 279 days	
3000 m	9:10.27	Zhong Huandi (CHN)	21 October 1991	Asian Championships	Kuala Lumpur, Malaysia	24 years, 115 days	
5000 m	15:52.74	Kate Anderson (AUS)	17 September 1998	Commonwealth Games	Kuala Lumpur, Malaysia	24 years, 316 days	
10,000 m	33:40.13	Esther Wanjiru (KEN)	20 September 1998	Commonwealth Games	Kuala Lumpur, Malaysia	21 years, 177 days	
Marathon	2:34:38	Roseline Nyangacha Kerubo (KEN)	27 June 2011	Kuala Lumpur Marathon	Kuala Lumpur, Malaysia	34 years, 242 days	
100 m hurdles	12.70 (−0.2 m/s)	Gillian Russell (JAM)	21 September 1998	Commonwealth Games	Kuala Lumpur, Malaysia	24 years, 358 days	
400 m hurdles	53.91	Andrea Blackett (BAR)	18 September 1998	Commonwealth Games	Kuala Lumpur, Malaysia	22 years, 237 days	
3000 m steeplechase	10:55.31	Melinder Kaur Ragbir Singh (MAS)	17 June 2010	Sukma Games	Malacca, Malaysia	22 years, 36 days	
High jump	1.91 m	Wang Wei (CHN)	21 August 1996		Kangar, Malaysia	27 years, 307 days	
High jump	1.91 m	Viktoria Seryogina (RUS)	21 August 1996		Kangar, Malaysia	23 years, 91 days	
High jump	1.91 m	Hestrie Storbeck (RSA)	20 September 1998	Commonwealth Games	Kuala Lumpur, Malaysia	17 years, 361 days	
High jump	1.91 m	Joanne Jennings (ENG)	20 September 1998	Commonwealth Games	Kuala Lumpur, Malaysia	26 years, 336 days	
Pole vault	4.35 m	Roslinda Samsu (MAS)	2 August 2009		Kuala Lumpur, Malaysia	27 years, 54 days	
Long jump	6.79 m (+0.3 m/s)	Ri Yong-ae (PRK)	21 October 1991	Asian Championships	Kuala Lumpur, Malaysia	25 years, 351 days	
Triple jump	14.32 m (+0.1 m/s)	Ashia Hansen (ENG)	21 September 1998	Commonwealth Games	Kuala Lumpur, Malaysia	26 years, 290 days	
Shot put	18.83 m	Judy Oakes (ENG)	18 September 1998	Commonwealth Games	Kuala Lumpur, Malaysia	40 years, 216 days	
Discus throw	65.92 m	Beatrice Faumuina (NZL)	20 September 1998	Commonwealth Games	Kuala Lumpur, Malaysia	23 years, 332 days	
Hammer throw	66.56 m	Deborah Sosimenko (AUS)	16 September 1998	Commonwealth Games	Kuala Lumpur, Malaysia	24 years, 164 days	
Javelin throw (old)	66.96 m	Louise McPaul (AUS)	19 September 1998	Commonwealth Games	Kuala Lumpur, Malaysia	29 years, 238 days	
Javelin throw	54.80 m	Buoban Pamang (THA)	13 September 2001	Southeast Asian Games	Kuala Lumpur, Malaysia	14 years, 260 days	
Heptathlon	6513 pts	Denise Lewis (ENG)	16–17 September 1998	Commonwealth Games	Kuala Lumpur, Malaysia	26 years, 21 days	
Heptathlon	100m H (wind) / High jump / Shot put / 200m (wind) / Long jump (wind) / Javelin / 800m; 13.77 (+0.4 m/s) / 1.82 m / 15.09 m / 24.47 (+0.0 m/s) / 6.52 m (+0.1 m/s) / 51.22 m / 2:21.90						
10 km walk (road)	43:57	Jane Saville (AUS)	19 September 1998	Commonwealth Games	Kuala Lumpur, Malaysia	23 years, 318 days	
20 km walk (road)	1:39:34	Yuan Yufang (MAS)	27 July 2003		Kuantan, Malaysia	27 years, 176 days	
50 km walk (road)	4:51:32	Norliana Mohd Rusni (MAS)	6 December 2014		Seremban, Malaysia	25 years, 41 days	
4 × 100 m relay	43.39	Australia; Tania Van Heer; Lauren Hewitt; Nova Maree Peris-Kneebone; Sharon Cripps	21 September 1998	Commonwealth Games	Kuala Lumpur, Malaysia	27 years, 265 days 19 years, 300 days 27 years, 208 days 21 years, 84 days	
4 × 400 m relay	3:27.28	Australia; Susan Andrews; Tamsyn Lewis; Lee Naylor; Tania Van Heer	21 September 1998	Commonwealth Games	Kuala Lumpur, Malaysia	27 years, 118 days 20 years, 63 days 27 years, 238 days 27 years, 265 days	
