= Mochov =

- Municipality
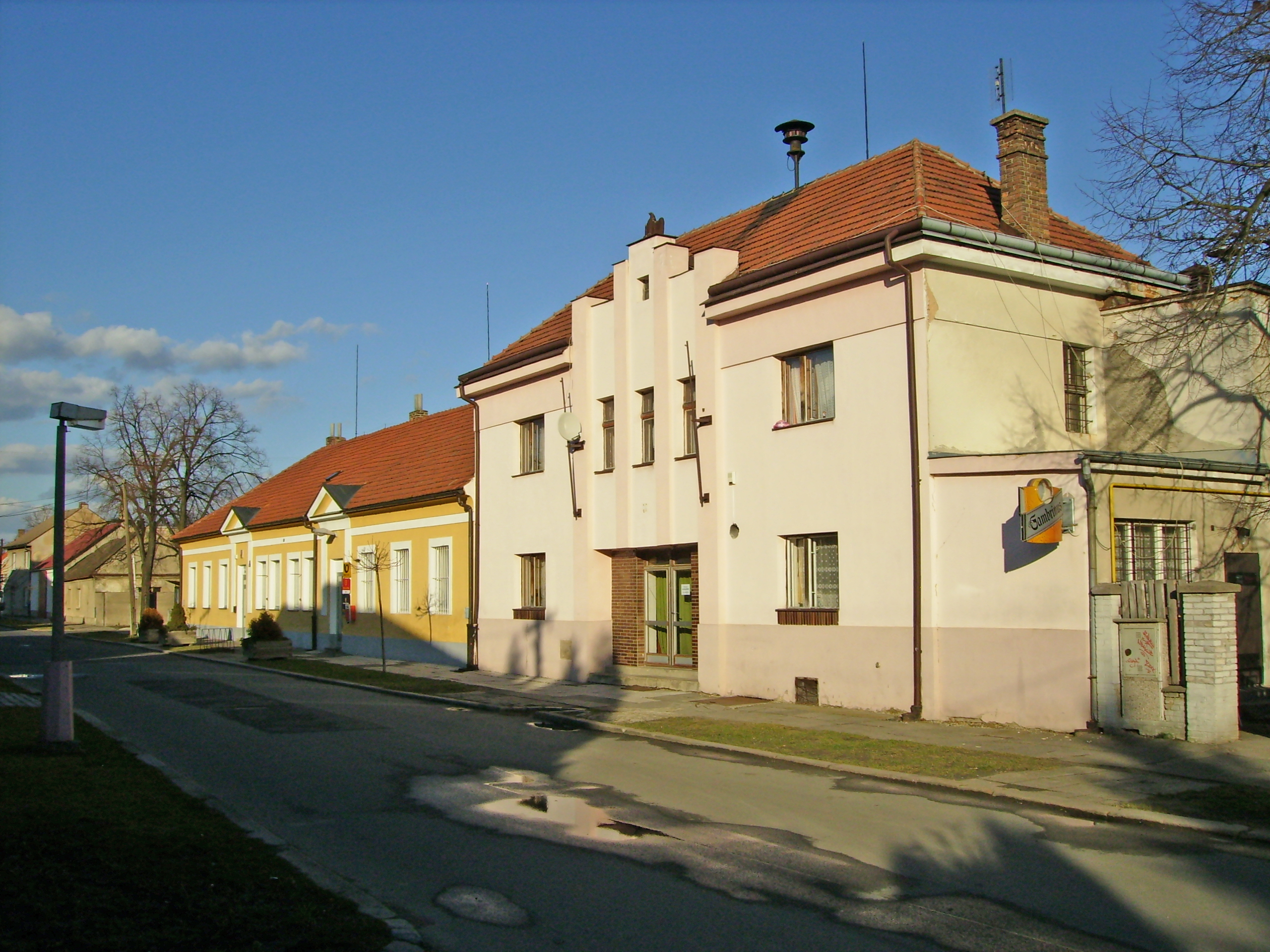
- Sokol hall and municipal office

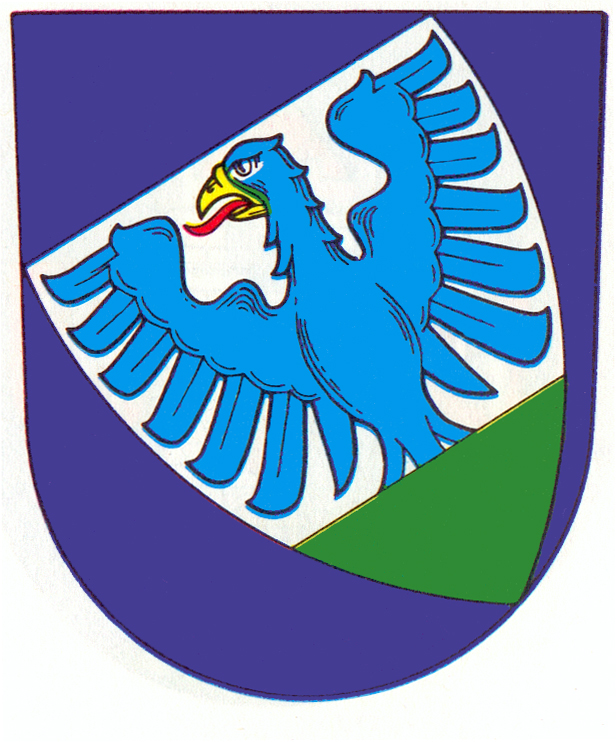
- Coat of arms

- Location in the Czech Republic
- Coordinates: 50°8′31″N 14°47′42″E
- Country: Czech Republic
- Region: Central Bohemian
- District: Prague-East
- First mentioned: 1360

Area
  - Total: 9.32 km^{2} (3.60 sq mi)
- Elevation: 193 m (633 ft)

Population (2026-01-01)
  - Total: 1,642
  - Density: 176/km^{2} (456/sq mi)
- Time zone: UTC+1 (CET)
  - Summer (DST): UTC+2 (CEST)
- Postal code: 250 87
- Website: www.mochov.cz

Mochov is a municipality and village in Prague-East District in the Central Bohemian Region of the Czech Republic. It has about 1,600 inhabitants.

== Etymology ==
The name is derived from the personal name Moch, meaning "Moch's (court)".

== Geography ==
Mochov is located about 18 kilometres (11 mi) east of Prague. It lies in a flat agricultural landscape in the Central Elbe Table. The Výmola Stream flows through the municipality.

== History ==
The first written mention of Mochov is from 1360. From 1437 to 1611, the village belonged to the Přerov estate. Then Emperor Rudolf II sold Mochov to Magdalena Trčka of Lípa, who joined it to the Kounice estate. It remained part of this estate until the establishment of an independent municipality in 1850.

== Demographics ==
Historical population

Year	Pop.	±%
1869	579	—
1880	742	+28.2%
1890	872	+17.5%
1900	820	−6.0%
1910	950	+15.9%

Year	Pop.	±%
1921	1,032	+8.6%
1930	1,118	+8.3%
1950	1,012	−9.5%
1961	934	−7.7%
1970	831	−11.0%

Year	Pop.	±%
1980	868	+4.5%
1991	896	+3.2%
2001	847	−5.5%
2011	1,288	+52.1%
2021	1,297	+0.7%

Source: Censuses

== Transport ==
The D11 motorway (part of the European route E67) from Prague to Hradec Králové runs through the municipality.

== Sights ==
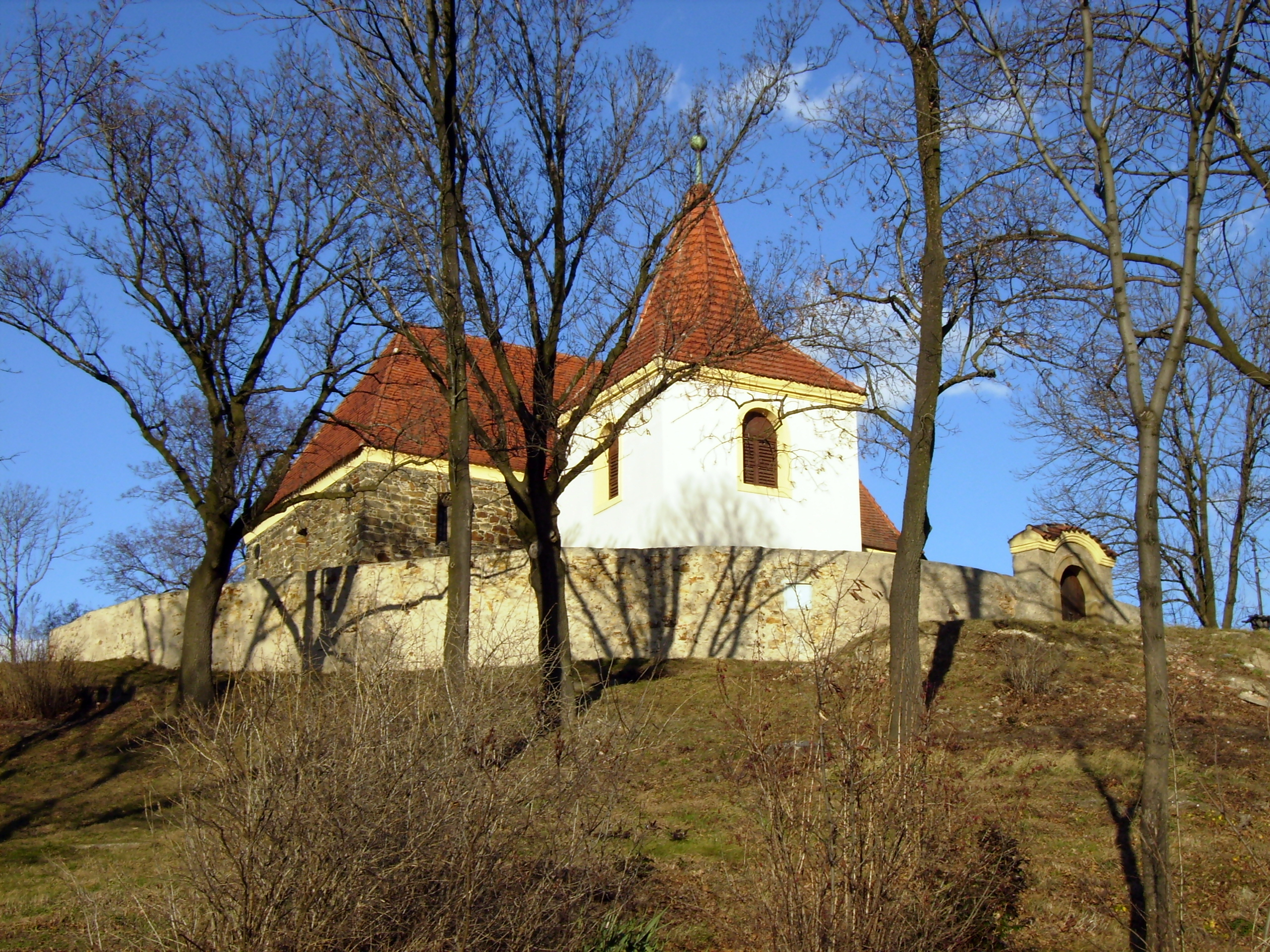
Church of Saint Bartholomew

The main landmark of Mochov is the Church of Saint Bartholomew. It is originally a late Gothic church from the 13th century, which was later rebuilt in the Baroque style.
