= Horoušany =

- Municipality
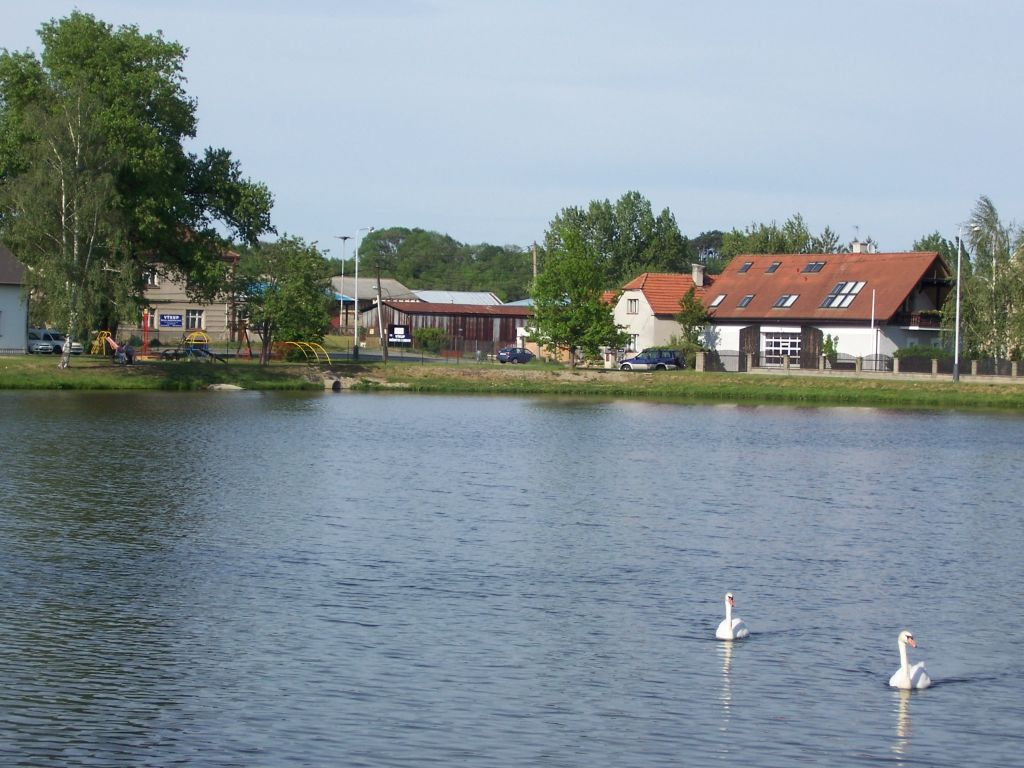
- Pond in the centre of Horoušany

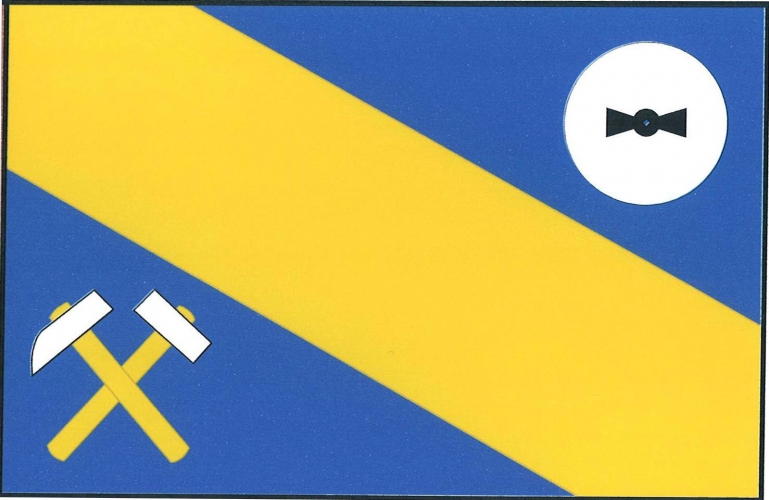
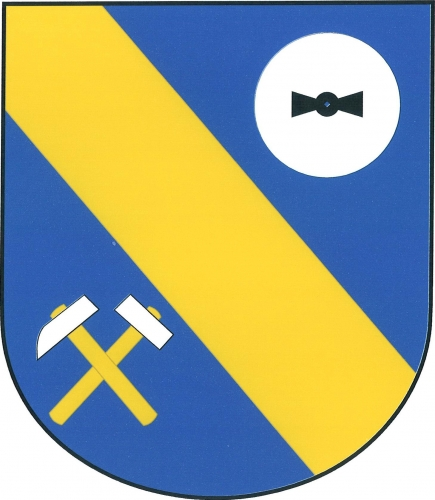
- Flag Coat of arms

- Location in the Czech Republic
- Coordinates: 50°6′23″N 14°44′26″E
- Country: Czech Republic
- Region: Central Bohemian
- District: Prague-East
- First mentioned: 1238

Area
  - Total: 7.06 km^{2} (2.73 sq mi)
- Elevation: 216 m (709 ft)

Population (2026-01-01)
  - Total: 2,155
  - Density: 305/km^{2} (791/sq mi)
- Time zone: UTC+1 (CET)
  - Summer (DST): UTC+2 (CEST)
- Postal code: 250 82
- Website: www.horousany.cz

Horoušany is a municipality and village in Prague-East District in the Central Bohemian Region of the Czech Republic. It has about 2,200 inhabitants.

== Administrative division ==
Horoušany consists of two municipal parts (in brackets population according to the 2021 census):

- Horoušany (563)
- Horoušánky (1,122)

== Etymology ==
The name Horoušany means 'the village of Horoušans', i.e. "the village of people who lived in Horouš". The name Horoušánky is a diminutive of Horoušany.

== Geography ==
Horoušany is located about 18 kilometres (11 mi) east of Prague. It lies in a flat agricultural landscape. It lies mostly in the Central Elbe Table, only the southwestern part of the municipal territory extends into the Prague Plateau. The stream Jirenský potok flows through the municipality. The fishpond Horoušanský rybník is located on this stream in the centre of Horoušany.

== History ==
The first written mention of Horoušany is from 1238, when the village was donated to the Zderaz monastery. In 1436, Horoušany was acquired by a noble family that began to call itself Horoušanský of Roztoky. In 1524–1611, the village was a part of the Přerov estate. In 1611, the village was annexed to the Kounice estate.

== Demographics ==
Historical population

Year	Pop.	±%
1869	575	—
1880	587	+2.1%
1890	583	−0.7%
1900	603	+3.4%
1910	588	−2.5%

Year	Pop.	±%
1921	611	+3.9%
1930	614	+0.5%
1950	521	−15.1%
1961	563	+8.1%
1970	505	−10.3%

Year	Pop.	±%
1980	440	−12.9%
1991	367	−16.6%
2001	405	+10.4%
2011	985	+143.2%
2021	1,685	+71.1%

Source: Censuses

== Transport ==
There are no railways or major roads passing through the municipality.

== Sights ==
The only protected cultural monument in the municipality is a sandstone crucifix from 1812.
