= 2022 World Athletics U20 Championships – Men's 100 metres =

Men's 100 metres at the 2022 World Athletics U20 Championships
- Venue: Estadio Olímpico Pascual Guerrero
- Dates: 1 August (qualification); 2 August (semifinal & final)
- Competitors: 63 from 46 nations
- Winning time: 9.91

Medalists
gold medal	Letsile Tebogo	Botswana
silver medal	Bouwahjgie Nkrumie	Jamaica
bronze medal	Benjamin Richardson	South Africa

The men's 100 metres at the 2022 World Athletics U20 Championships was held at the Estadio Olímpico Pascual Guerrero in Cali, Colombia on 1 and 2 August 2022.

Originally, 78 athletes from 51 countries entered to the competition, however, only 63 of them participated.

== Records ==
U20 standing records prior to the 2022 World Athletics U20 Championships were as follows:

Record	Athlete & Nationality	Mark	Location	Date
World U20 Record	Trayvon Bromell (USA)	9.97	Eugene, United States	13 June 2014
World U20 Record	Letsile Tebogo (BOT)	9.94*	Eugene, United States	15 July 2022
Championship Record	Adam Gemili (GBR)	10.05	Barcelona, Spain	11 July 2012
World U20 Leading	Letsile Tebogo (BOT)	9.94	Eugene, United States	15 July 2022

*Mark pending ratification

== Results ==
=== Round 1 ===
Round 1 took place on 1 August, with the 63 athletes involved being split into 8 heats, 7 heats of 8 and 1 of 7 athletes. The first 2 athletes in each heat ( Q ) and the next 8 fastest ( q ) qualified to the semi-final. The overall results were as follows:

Wind:
Heat 1: +0.2 m/s, Heat 2: -1.2 m/s, Heat 3: -0.6 m/s, Heat 4: +1.7 m/s, Heat 5: -1.2 m/s, Heat 6: -0.9 m/s, Heat 7: -2.9 m/s, Heat 8: +0.8 m/s

Rank	Heat	Name	Nationality	Time	Note
1	3	Letsile Tebogo	Botswana	10.00	Q CR
2	8	Muhd Azeem Fahmi	Malaysia	10.09	Q NR
3	6	Puripol Boonson	Thailand	10.20	Q
4	8	Hiroki Yanagita	Japan	10.24	Q
5	4	Sandrey Davison	Jamaica	10.25 [.246]	Q
6	1	Alessio Faggin	Italy	10.25 [.250]	Q PB
7	2	Benjamin Richardson	South Africa	10.33	Q
8	8	Tomás Mondino	Argentina	10.34	q NU20R
9	6	Michael Gizzi	United States	10.35	Q
10	1	Mukhethwa Tshifura	South Africa	10.36	Q
11	1	Kakene Sitali	Zambia	10.38	q
12	5	Michael Onilogbo	Great Britain	10.39 [.385]	Q
13	5	Laurenz Colbert	United States	10.39 [.388]	Q
14	7	Bouwahjgie Nkrumie	Jamaica	10.39 [.389]	Q
15	6	Ronal Longa	Colombia	10.40 [.393]	q PB
16	3	Marek Zakrzewski	Poland	10.40 [.395]	Q
17	8	Almond Small	Canada	10.41 [.402]	q
18	4	Hiroto Fujiwara	Japan	10.41 [.404]	Q
19	2	Reynaldo Espinosa	Cuba	10.41 [.406]	Q
20	5	Connor Bond	Australia	10.43	q
21	4	Carlos Flórez	Colombia	10.45	q SB
22	2	Nazzio John	Grenada	10.47 [.467]	q =SB
23	8	Diego González	Puerto Rico	10.47 [.470]	q PB
24	6	Ajani Daley	Antigua and Barbuda	10.48	PB
25	6	Chidiera Onuoha	Germany	10.50	
26	6	Valtteri Louko	Finland	10.52	PB
27	3	Eduardo Longobardi	Italy	10.53 [.525]	
28	1	Desmond Fraser	Canada	10.53 [.530]	
29	5	Ogheneovo Mabilo	Nigeria	10.54	
30	2	Thawatchai Himaiad	Thailand	10.55	PB
31	3	Davonte Howell	Cayman Islands	10.56 [.551]	PB
32	7	Jeff Erius	France	10.56 [.555]	Q
33	6	Renan Correa	Brazil	10.56 [.559]	
34	1	Jai Gordon	Australia	10.59	
35	2	Revell Webster	Trinidad and Tobago	10.62	
36	7	Eddie Reddemann	Germany	10.63 [.624]	
37	4	Zachary Evans	Bahamas	10.63 [.629]	
38	3	Niko Kangasoja	Finland	10.66 [.656]	
39	8	Lucas Gabriel Fernandes	Brazil	10.66 [.660]	
40	7	José Rodríguez	Mexico	10.67 [.663]	
41	2	Wanya McCoy	Bahamas	10.67 [.670]	
42	4	Mark Ren Lee	Singapore	10.69	
43	3	Wanyae Belle	British Virgin Islands	10.71	
44	7	Jernej Gumilar	Slovenia	10.72	
45	1	Kyle Lawrence	Saint Vincent and the Grenadines	10.73	
46	5	Paulo Pereira	Portugal	10.78	
47	7	Erik Erlandsson	Sweden	10.81	
48	8	Aman Khokhar	India	10.84	
49	2	Panashe Blessed Nhenga	Zimbabwe	10.86	
50	7	Bautista Diamante	Argentina	10.89	SB
51	1	Mohammed Hasan Miah	Bangladesh	10.99	SB
52	5	Beppe Grillo	Malta	11.05	
53	7	Miguel Ángel Aronátegui	Panama	11.25	=SB
54	5	Glenford Williams	Belize	11.28	=SB
55	4	Nathan Castro	Guam	11.35 [.343]	NU20R
56	2	Ashley Manana	Madagascar	11.35 [.344]	PB
57	6	Kylian Vatrican	Monaco	11.35 [.346]	NU20R
58	8	Lassana Tarawally	Liberia	11.39	PB
59	3	Devin Augustine	Trinidad and Tobago	12.39	
60	4	Bryant Alamo	Venezuela	28.32	
	4	Adekalu Fakorede	Nigeria	DNS	
	5	Shamar Horatio	Guyana	DNS	
	1	Ezequiel Newton	Guyana	DNS	

=== Semi-final ===
The semi-final took place on 2 August, with the 24 athletes involved being split into 3 heats of 8 athletes each. The first 2 athletes in each heat ( Q ) and the next 2 fastest ( q ) qualified to the final. The overall results were as follows:

Wind:
Heat 1: +0.6 m/s, Heat 2: +0.7 m/s, Heat 3: -0.4 m/s

Rank	Heat	Name	Nationality	Time	Note
1	2	Puripol Boonson	Thailand	10.09	Q NU20R
2	3	Bouwahjgie Nkrumie	Jamaica	10.11	Q =NU20R
3	1	Letsile Tebogo	Botswana	10.14	Q
4	2	Hiroki Yanagita	Japan	10.15	Q PB
5	1	Benjamin Richardson	South Africa	10.17	Q
6	3	Muhd Azeem Fahmi	Malaysia	10.19	Q
7	1	Laurenz Colbert	United States	10.29 [.285]	q
7	2	Reynaldo Espinosa	Cuba	10.29 [.285]	q PB
9	2	Michael Gizzi	United States	10.30 [.291]	
10	2	Connor Bond	Australia	10.30 [.292]	PB
11	3	Nazzio John	Grenada	10.31 [.309]	PB
11	3	Alessio Faggin	Italy	10.31 [.309]	
13	2	Jeff Erius	France	10.34	
14	1	Michael Onilogbo	Great Britain	10.39	
15	1	Diego González	Puerto Rico	10.42	PB
16	1	Kakene Sitali	Zambia	10.43	
17	3	Almond Small	Canada	10.44	
18	2	Carlos Flórez	Colombia	10.45 [.444]	=SB
19	1	Ronal Longa	Colombia	10.45 [.447]	
20	3	Hiroto Fujiwara	Japan	10.48	
21	3	Mukhethwa Tshifura	South Africa	10.58	
22	3	Tomás Mondino	Argentina	10.59	
23	1	Marek Zakrzewski	Poland	10.68	
	2	Sandrey Davison	Jamaica	DNF	

=== Final ===
The final was started at 17:59 on 2 August. The results were as follows:

Wind: +0.8 m/s

Rank	Lane	Name	Nationality	Time	Note
1st place, gold medalist(s)	4	Letsile Tebogo	Botswana	9.91	WU20R
2nd place, silver medalist(s)	6	Bouwahjgie Nkrumie	Jamaica	10.02	NU20R
3rd place, bronze medalist(s)	7	Benjamin Richardson	South Africa	10.12 [.117]	
4	5	Puripol Boonson	Thailand	10.12 [.118]	
5	8	Muhd Azeem Fahmi	Malaysia	10.14	
6	3	Hiroki Yanagita	Japan	10.24 [.232]	
7	1	Laurenz Colbert	United States	10.24 [.235]	
8	2	Reynaldo Espinosa	Cuba	10.32	
