= Athletics at the 1998 Commonwealth Games – Men's 50 kilometres walk =

Men's 50 kilometres walk at the Commonwealth Games

The men's 50 kilometres walk event at the 1998 Commonwealth Games was held on 21 September in Kuala Lumpur. This was the first time this distance was held at the Commonwealth Games, together with 20 kilometres walk replacing the 30 kilometres walk event.

The race was led by Craig Barrett of New Zealand until one kilometre before the finishing line when he collapsed from dehydration. Govindasamy Saravanan from Malaysia went on to win gaining his country's first ever Commonwealth Games gold medal in athletics.

== Results ==
Rank	Name	Nationality	Time	Notes
1st place, gold medalist(s)	Govindasamy Saravanan	Malaysia	4:10:05	NR
2nd place, silver medalist(s)	Duane Cousins	Australia	4:10:30	
3rd place, bronze medalist(s)	Dominic McGrath	Australia	4:12:52	
4	Steven Hollier	England	4:18:41	
5	Mark Easton	England	4:22:23	
6	Graham White	Scotland	4:30:17	
7	Kannian Pushparajan	Malaysia	4:31:22	
8	Chris Cheeseman	England	4:38:36	
9	Thirukumaran Balaysendaran	Malaysia	4:44:33	
10	Tony Sargisson	New Zealand	4:45:04	
	Craig Barrett	New Zealand	DNF	
	Tim Berrett	Canada	DNF	
	Dion Russell	Australia	DNF	
