= 2000 Asian Athletics Championships – Women's 10,000 metres walk =

The women's 10,000 metres walk event at the 2000 Asian Athletics Championships was held in Jakarta, Indonesia on 30 August.

== Results ==
Rank	Name	Nationality	Time	Notes
1st place, gold medalist(s)	Li Hong	China	44:59.90	CR
2nd place, silver medalist(s)	Sun Chunfang	China	45:42.68	
3rd place, bronze medalist(s)	Yuan Yufang	Malaysia	46:12.66	
4	Yuka Mitsumori	Japan	47:29.18	
5	Darwati	Indonesia	51:56.33	
5	Tersiana Riwurohi	Indonesia	54:47.53	
