= 2003 Asian Athletics Championships – Women's 20 kilometres walk =

The Women's 20 kilometers walk event at the 2003 Asian Athletics Championships was held in Manila, Philippines on September 23, 2003.

== Results ==
Rank	Name	Nationality	Time	Notes
1st place, gold medalist(s)	Ha Mingming	China	1:31:47	CR
2nd place, silver medalist(s)	Zou Ying	China	1:32:07	PB
3rd place, bronze medalist(s)	Yuan Yufang	Malaysia	1:32:25	NR
4	Kaori Nikaido	Japan	1:34:05	SB
5	Gallage Geetha Nandani	Sri Lanka	1:41:08	SB
6	Melinda Manahan	Philippines	1:47:52	NR
