= Badrul Hisyam Abdul Manap =

Malaysian competitive runner

Personal information
- Full name: Badrul Hisyam Bin Abdul Manap
- Nationality: Malaysian
- Born: 2 January 1997 (age 29) Kampung Batu Gajah, Merlimau, Melaka

Sport
- Sport: Running
- Event(s): 100 metres, 200 metres, 400 metres, 4 × 100 metres relay, 4 × 400 metres relay

Achievements and titles
- Personal best(s): 100 m: 10.29 s (Bandar Seri Begawan 2015); 200 m: 20.88 s (Arau 2015); 400 m: 47.46 s (Bhubaneswar 2017)
Medal record
Olympic medal record
Men's athletics
Representing Malaysia
Asian Junior Athletics Championships
Silver medal – second place	2016 Ho Chi Minh City	4×100m relay
ASEAN School Games
Gold medal – first place	2015 Bandar Segi Begawan	100m
Gold medal – first place	2014 Marikina	100m
Gold medal – first place	2015 Bandar Segi Begawan	200m
Gold medal – first place	2014 Marikina	200m
Gold medal – first place	2015 Bandar Segi Begawan	4×100m relay
Gold medal – first place	2014 Marikina	4×100m relay
Gold medal – first place	2014 Marikina	4×400m relay
Silver medal – second place	2015 Bandar Segi Begawan	4×400m relay

Badrul Hisyam bin Abdul Manap (born 2 January 1997) in Kampung Batu Gajah, Merlimau, Melaka is a Malaysian competitive runner, competing in events ranging from 100 m to 400 m. He was the former Malaysian 100 m outdoor record holder with a time of 10.29 seconds. The wind measurement was a tailwind of 1.92 metres a seconds, within the legal limit of 2.0 m/s.

At the age of 18, Badrul won the 100 m, 200 m and the 4 × 100 m relay titles at the 2015 ASEAN School Games. Just before the meet in Brunei, Badrul displayed his potential in October 2015 when he became the country's fastest 200 m runner ever posting 20.88 seconds at the UniMAP Open in Arau, faster than Mani Jegathesan's 1968 record of 20.92s. Unfortunately for Badrul, the time was set with a tailwind exceeding 2.0 m/s and cannot be recognised as a record.

Badrul grew up in Merlimau, Malacca, where he took part in futsal and badminton, before his sprinting prowess was discovered.
