= Athletics at the 1998 Commonwealth Games – Men's 3000 metres steeplechase =

Men's 3000 metres steeplechase at the Commonwealth Games

The men's 3000 metres steeplechase event at the 1998 Commonwealth Games was held on 17 September on National Stadium, Bukit Jalil.

== Results ==
Rank	Name	Nationality	Time	Notes
1st place, gold medalist(s)	John Kosgei	Kenya	8:15.34	
2nd place, silver medalist(s)	Bernard Barmasai	Kenya	8:15.37	
3rd place, bronze medalist(s)	Kipkirui Misoi	Kenya	8:18.24	
4	Joël Bourgeois	Canada	8:34.50	
5	Chris Unthank	Australia	8:37.24	
6	Christian Stephenson	Wales	8:42.95	
7	Benedict Whitby	England	8:44.24	
8	Craig Wheeler	England	8:57.29	
9	Nainasagoram Shanmuganathan	Malaysia	8:59.10	NR
	Gavin Spencer	England	DNF	
