= Nehvizdy =

- Market town
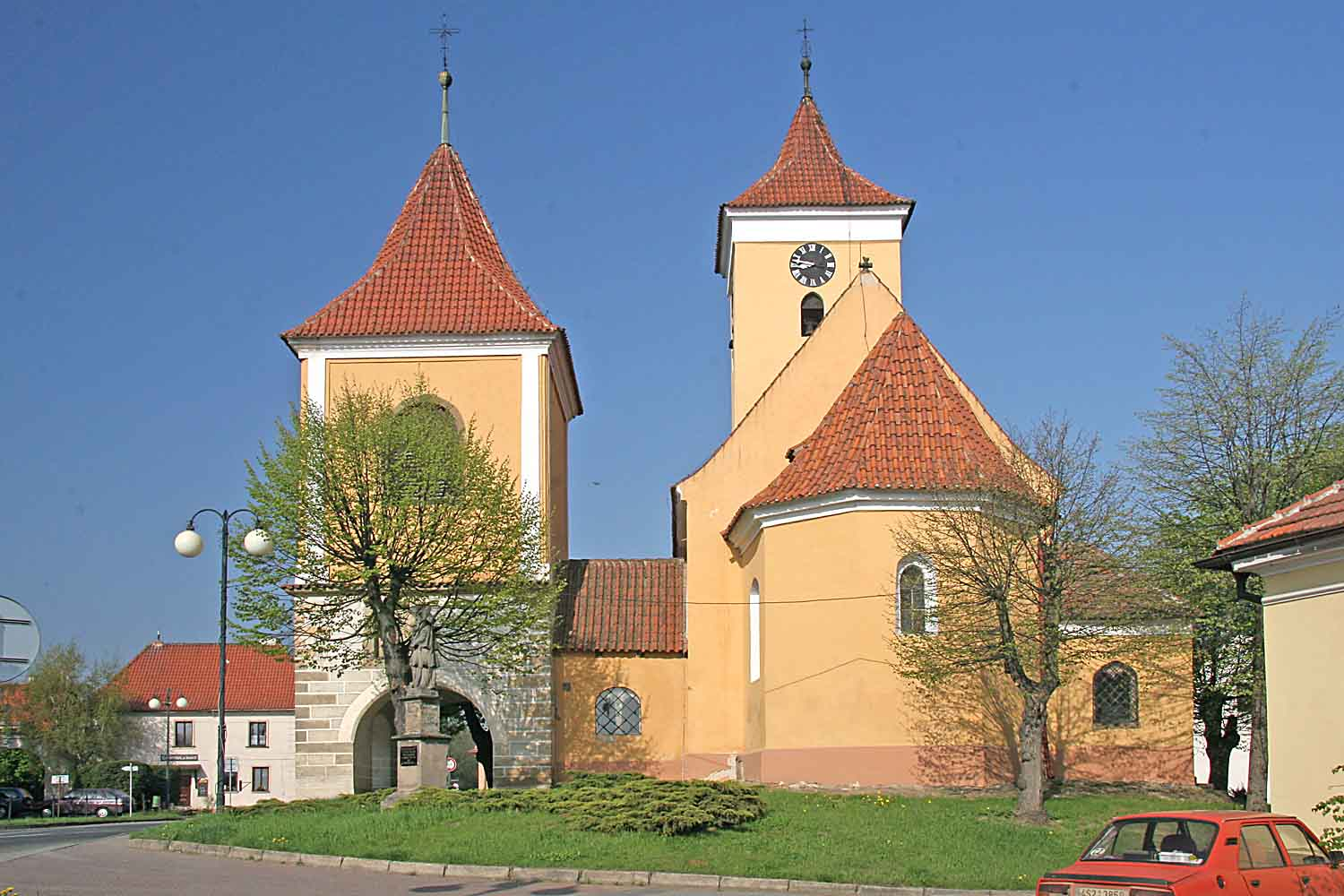
- Church of Saint Wenceslaus and bell tower

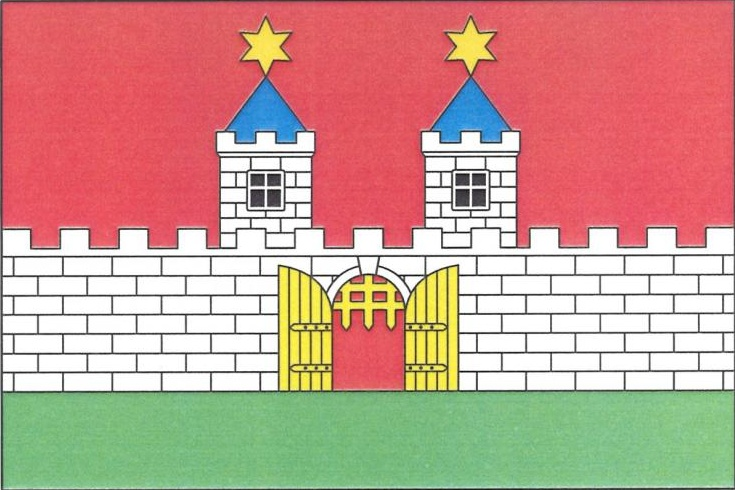
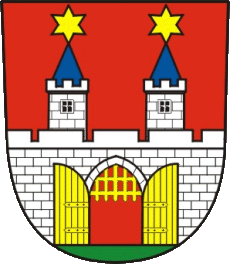
- Flag Coat of arms

- Location in the Czech Republic
- Coordinates: 50°7′50″N 14°43′48″E
- Country: Czech Republic
- Region: Central Bohemian
- District: Prague-East
- First mentioned: 1352

Area
  - Total: 9.83 km^{2} (3.80 sq mi)
- Elevation: 240 m (790 ft)

Population (2026-01-01)
  - Total: 4,528
  - Density: 461/km^{2} (1,190/sq mi)
- Time zone: UTC+1 (CET)
  - Summer (DST): UTC+2 (CEST)
- Postal code: 250 81
- Website: www.nehvizdy.cz

Nehvizdy (Czech pronunciation: [ˈnɛɦvɪzdɪ]; German: Nehwizd) is a market town in Prague-East District in the Central Bohemian Region of the Czech Republic. It has about 4,500 inhabitants, making it the most populous market town in the country.

== Administrative division ==
Nehvizdy consists of two municipal parts (in brackets population according to the 2021 census):

- Nehvizdy (3,877)
- Nehvízdky (40)

== Etymology ==
The name is derived either from the Czech word nehvízdat ('not to whistle'), meaning "the village of people who do not whistle" or from the personal name Nehvizd, meaning "the village of Nehvizds (Nehvizd family)". The name Nehvízdky is a diminutive of Nehvizdy.

== Geography ==
Nehvizdy is located about 8 kilometres (5 mi) east of Prague. It lies in a flat agricultural landscape in the Central Elbe Table.

== History ==
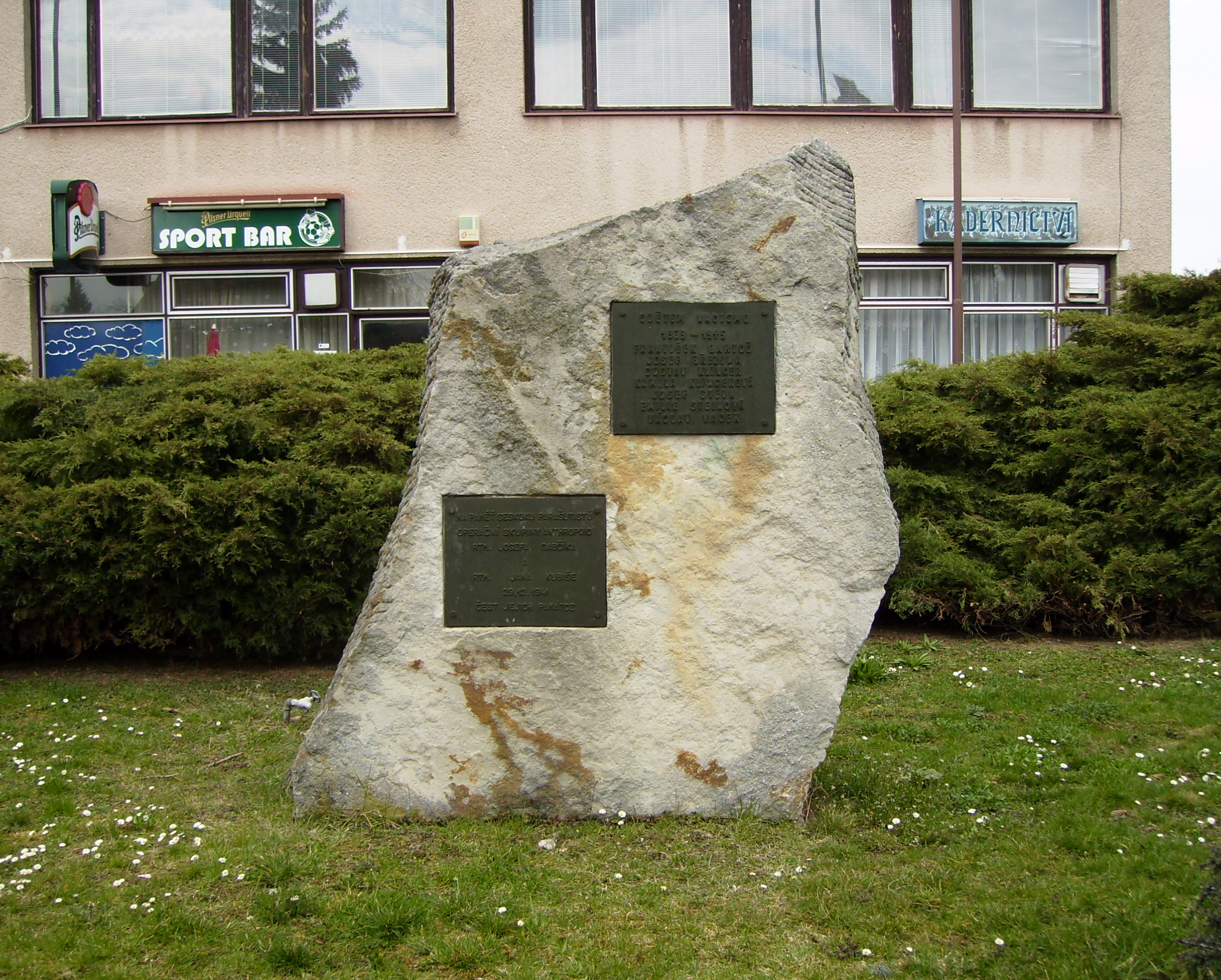
Gabčík and Kubiš Memorial

The first written mention of Nehvizdy (regarding local parish) is from 1352. Until the Hussite Wars, the village was owned by various lesser noblemen. After the wars, it became part of the Přerov estate. In 1515, Nehvizdy was promoted to a market town by King Vladislaus II. The period of greatest development occurred in the first half of the 17th century, but it ended with the advent of the Thirty Years' War, during which the market town was looted several times. After the war, Nehvizdy was acquired by the Liechtenstein family.

On 29 December 1941, Czechoslovak paratroopers Jozef Gabčík and Jan Kubiš sent by the Czech government-in-exile in London to assassinate Reinhard Heydrich were inserted near Nehvizdy (they overflew their predesignated target area near Plzeň by more than a hundred kilometres due to a navigational error). The soldiers hid themselves in a nearby abandoned quarry and with the help of several local citizens were able to relink with collaborators and later fulfill the mission.

== Demographics ==
The market town has experienced significant growth of population in the 21st century.

Historical population

Year	Pop.	±%
1869	862	—
1880	766	−11.1%
1890	853	+11.4%
1900	793	−7.0%
1910	837	+5.5%

Year	Pop.	±%
1921	812	−3.0%
1930	1,130	+39.2%
1950	938	−17.0%
1961	930	−0.9%
1970	900	−3.2%

Year	Pop.	±%
1980	904	+0.4%
1991	825	−8.7%
2001	848	+2.8%
2011	2,166	+155.4%
2021	3,917	+80.8%

Source: Censuses

== Transport ==
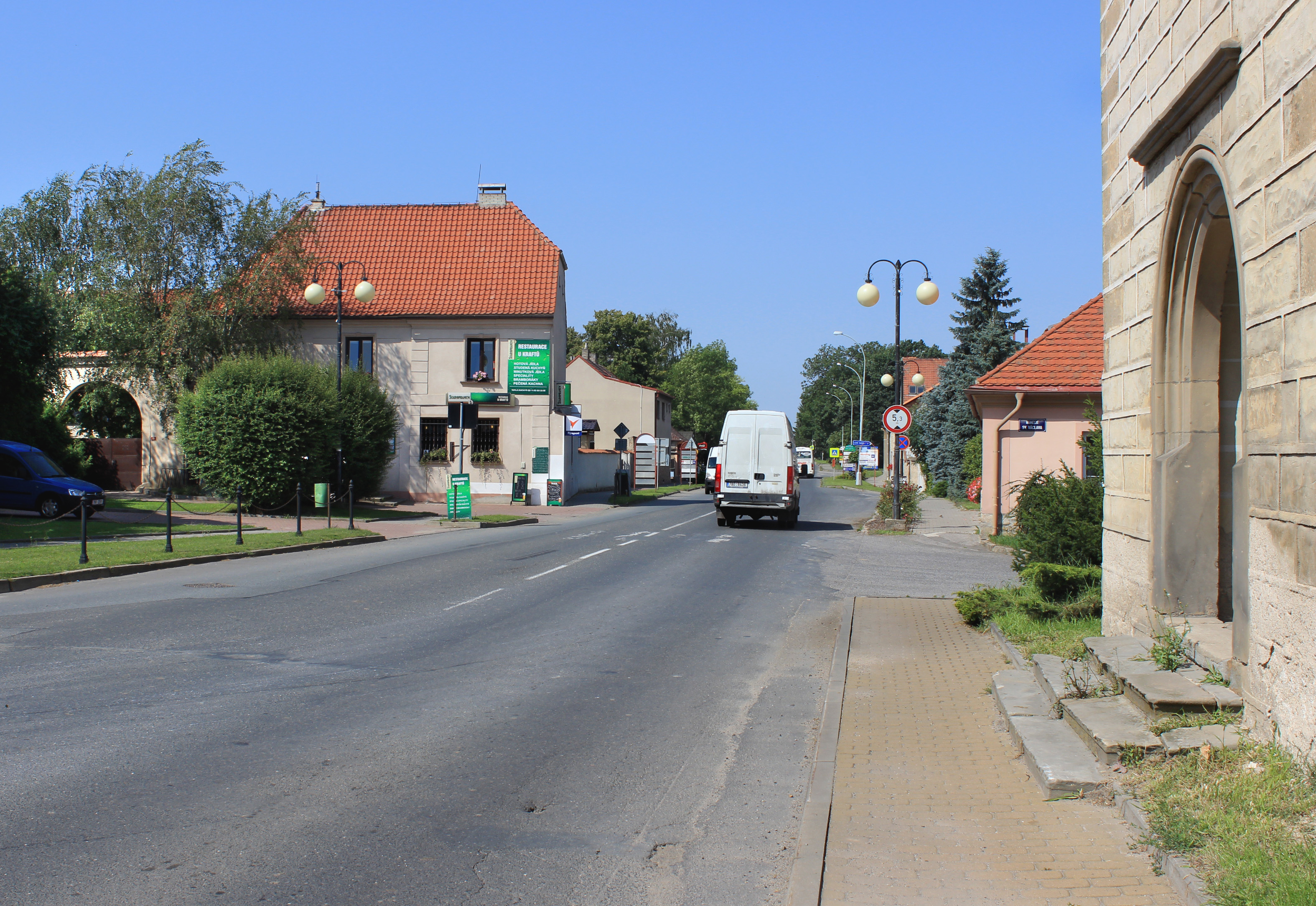
Main street

Nehvizdy lies on a road connecting Prague with Poděbrady and Hradec Králové. Nowadays the D11 motorway runs just south of the market town parallel to the old road.

== Sights ==
The main landmark of Nehvizdy is the Church of Saint Wenceslaus. It was built in the Gothic style in the late 13th century and was first mentioned in 1361. The adjacent bell tower dates from the 16th century.

A small monument in the centre of Nehvizdy commemorates the Operation Anthropoid event. It is formed in the shape of a parachute and it was created in 2021.
