= Archduke Ludwig Salvator of Austria =

Archduke Ludwig Salvator
- Count of Neuendorf
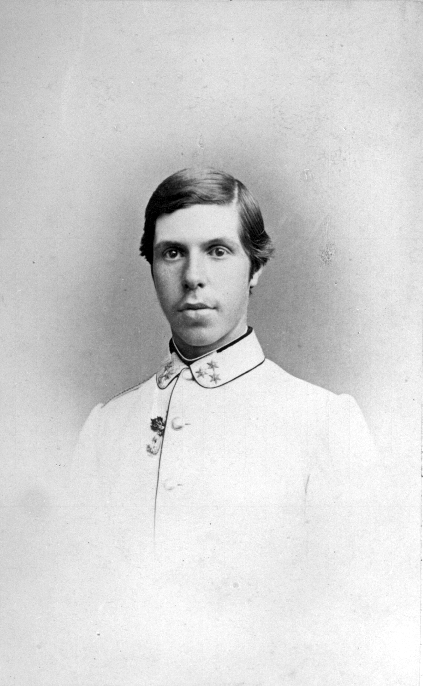
- Ludwig Salvator c. 1870
- Born: 4 August 1847; Florence, Tuscany
- Died: 12 October 1915 (aged 68); Brandýs nad Labem, Austria-Hungary
Names
- (Italian: Luigi Salvatore Maria Giuseppe Giovanni Battista Dominico Raineri Ferdinando Carlo Zenobio Antonino) (German: Ludwig Salvator Maria Joseph Johann Baptist Dominicus Rainerius Ferdinand Carl Zenobius Antonin) (English: Louis Salvator Mary Joseph John Baptist Dominic Rainer Ferdinand Charles Zenobius Anthony)
- House: Habsburg-Lorraine
- Father: Leopold II, Grand Duke of Tuscany
- Mother: Princess Maria Antonia of the Two Sicilies

Archduke Ludwig Salvator of Austria (Italian: Luigi Salvatore Maria Giuseppe Giovanni Battista Dominico Raineri Ferdinando Carlo Zenobio Antonino, German: Ludwig Salvator Maria Joseph Johann Baptist Dominicus Rainerius Ferdinand Carl Zenobius Antonin; 4 August 1847 – 12 October 1915) was an Austrian archduke of the House of Habsburg. He became known as a champion for Mallorca's wildlife, in an era when the term "conservation" was not highly regarded. The Balearic Islands commemorated the centenary of the death of Archduke Ludwig Salvator during 2015.

Ludwig Salvator settled on Mallorca, buying up unimproved areas of land in order to preserve and enjoy them. His main residence of Son Marroig, near the village of Deià, is now a museum. Much of what was his property now belongs to the American actor Michael Douglas, notably the Moorish style palace 'S'Estaca' that Ludwig converted from a ruined old manor house.

In 1895, at Přerov nad Labem, Bohemia, he founded the first open-air museum in Central and Eastern Europe.

== Works ==
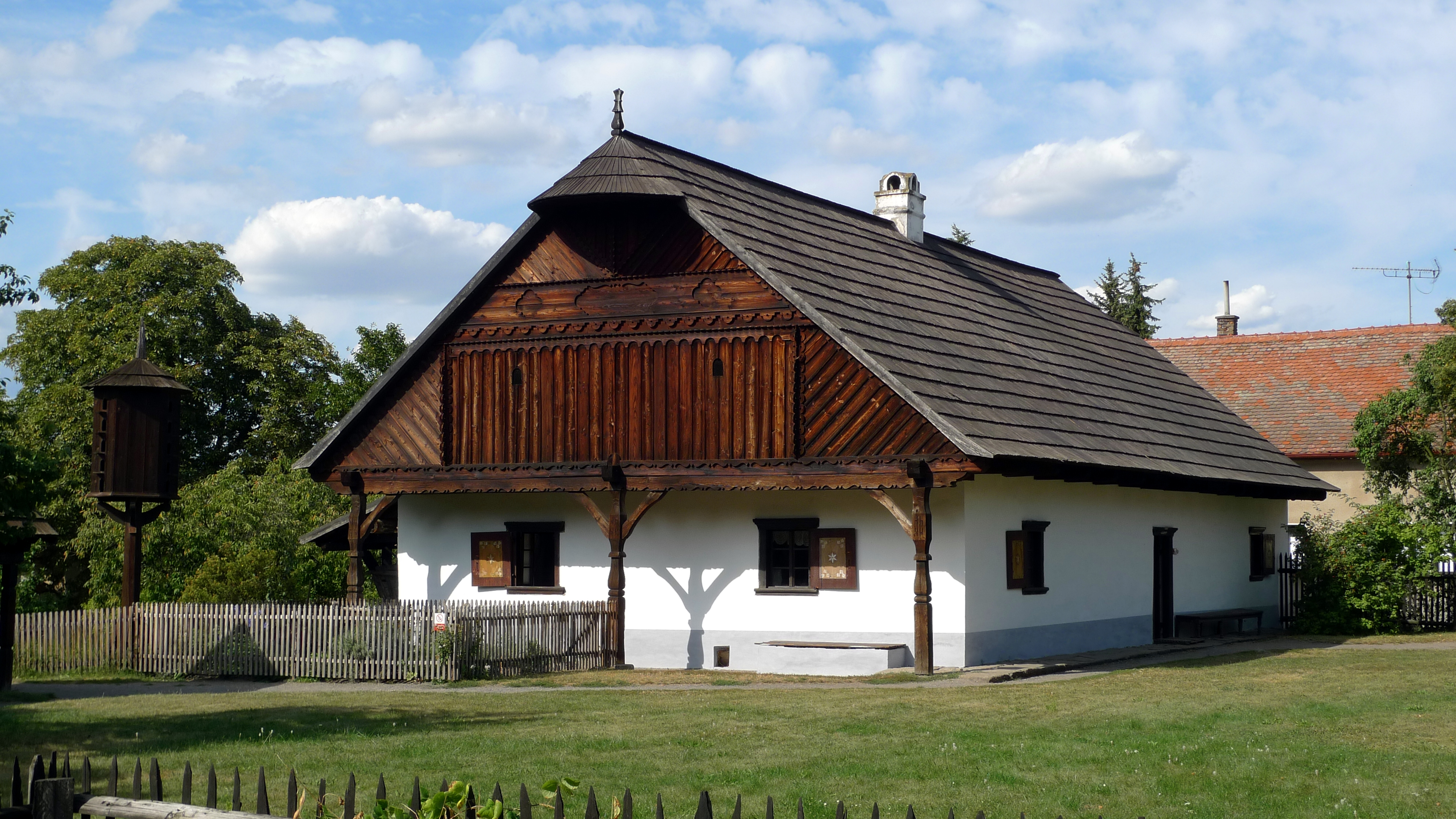
Old Bohemian House in Přerov nad Labem, Czech Republic – the first open-air museum in Central and Eastern Europe (1895)

He wrote a book on insects at the age of 22 and also the nine-volume book Die Balearen (The Balearic Islands). Having visited Los Angeles, California, in the winter of 1876, he published in 1878 an account of his visit, Los Angeles in Südcalifornien. Eine Blume aus dem goldenen Lande.

== Background ==
He was the second cousin of Emperor Franz Joseph, of the ruling House of Habsburg-Lorraine, the fourth son of Leopold II, Grand Duke of Tuscany. Ludwig went to Mallorca under his title of Count of Neuendorf, arriving in 1867. Falling in love with the clear air, water and dazzling blue skies of Mallorca it was to become his base and home for the remainder of his life.

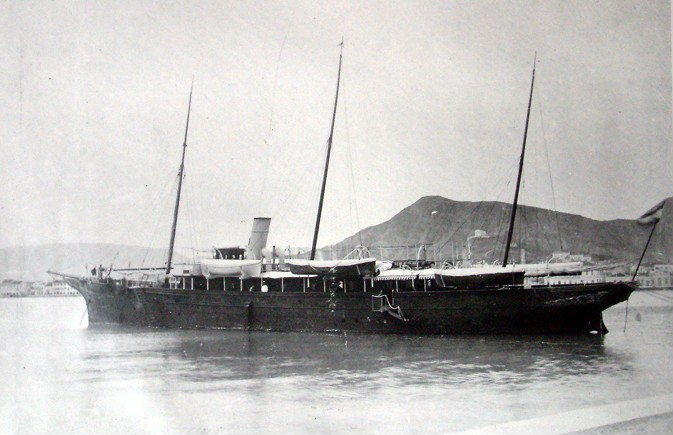
The Nixe II

He explored on his steam-yacht the Nixe. He was known for his extreme love of animals and nature.

Archduke Ludwig Salvator never married. When he was young, he fell in love with a cousin, Archduchess Mathilde, the daughter of the Duke of Teschen. Ludwig wanted to marry her, but she was promised to Prince Umberto of Savoy. On 6 June 1867, Mathilde, then only 18, was getting dressed to attend the theatre. She enjoyed smoking cigarettes, but when her father, who abhorred smoking appeared, she tried to hide the cigarette behind her. Her dress caught fire, and she died in front of her family, sustaining second and third-degree burns. Relationships with women included Catalina Homar. She convinced Ludwig to let her visit Jerusalem and it is believed that it was there that she contracted the leprosy that took her life in 1905.

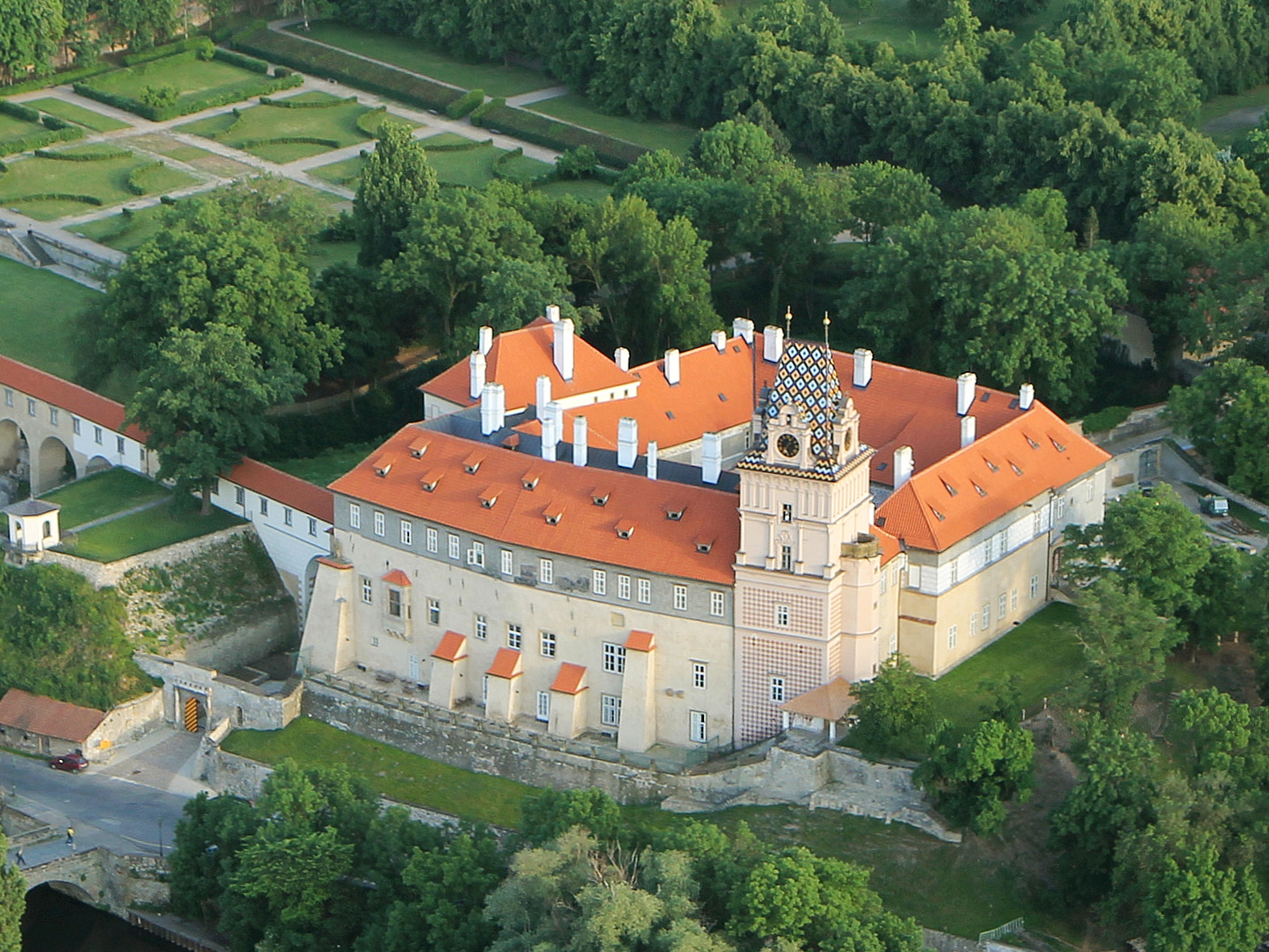
Castle in Brandýs nad Labem where Ludwig Salvator lived after his exile from Tuscany until his death

When the First World War broke out, in 1914, the Emperor of Austria ordered Ludwig Salvator to leave Mallorca, and in 1915, he died at the family castle of Brandeis-Altbunzlau, in Bohemia. He was buried in Vienna. In his will he designated Antonio Vives y Colom –his personal secretary, collaborator and trusted man, whom he met in Mallorca, and who accompanied him from 1872 until his death– and his children as his heirs.

== Researcher and chronicler of the Mediterranean sea ==
Monarchical styles of Archduke Ludwig Salvator of Austria
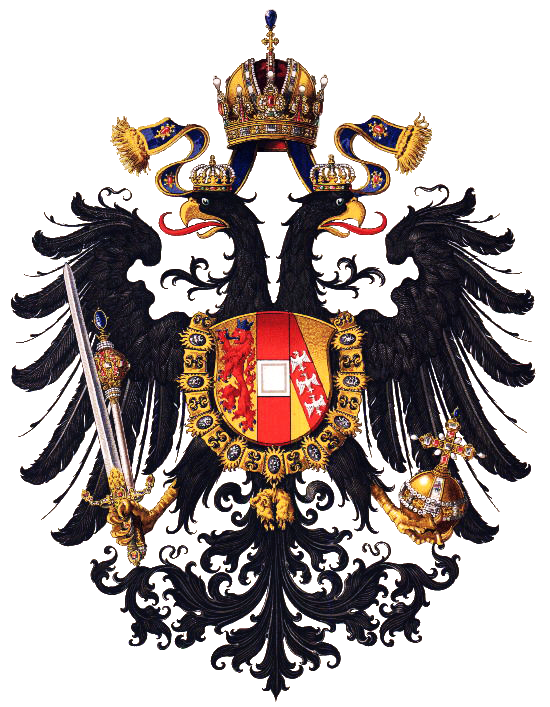
- Reference style: His Imperial and Royal Highness
- Spoken style: Your Imperial and Royal Highness

It was of great importance to Ludwig Salvator to stimulate public interest in landscapes, which he thought were unjustifiably little known and rarely visited. His attention focused less on classical cultural centers, but on small, undiscovered regions, like Collection of costumes and type images of Serbs in the region on the Adriatic Sea between Rijeka and northern Albania by 45 plates with color lithographs based on watercolors Die Serben an der Adria (1870–1878), including the islands of Paxos and Antipaxos, Ithaca, Lefkada and Zakynthos in the Ionian Sea and the Aeolian Islands in the north of Sicily, the islands of Giglio, Ustica and Alboran, and especially the then largely unknown Balearic Islands of Mallorca, Menorca, Eivissa (Ibiza) and Formentera. In 1869, there appeared the first volume, dedicated to Emperor Franz Joseph, of his massive Die Balearen. In Wort und Bild geschildert (The Balearic Islands, portrayed in words and images); the total work encompasses seven separate volumes extending to approximately 6000 pages. For their first two volumes he was awarded the gold medal of the Paris World Exhibition of 1878. This monograph contains descriptions of animals, plants, meteorology, history, folklore, architecture, landscape descriptions and also detailed descriptions of the population, their customs, songs and poems. In 1897 there was published a two-volume popular edition with the same title that contained the main illustrations and texts. It is located on loan from the Österreichische Geographische Gesellschaft (Austrian Geographical Society) in the National Archives of Austria.

== Honours and arms ==
Styles of Archduke Ludwig Salvator
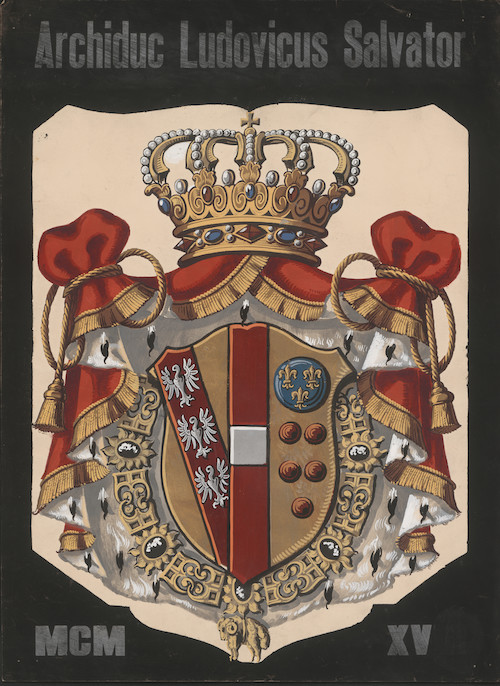
- Reference style: His Imperial and Royal Highness
- Spoken style: Your Imperial and Royal Highness

- Austria-Hungary:
  - Knight of the Golden Fleece
  - Military Jubilee Cross
- Grand Duchy of Tuscany: Grand Cross of St. Joseph
- Spain: Grand Cross of the Order of Charles III
