= Yuan Yufang =

Malaysian race walker

Medal record

Women's athletics

Representing Malaysia

Asian Championships
Bronze medal – third place	2000 Jakarta	10 km walk
Bronze medal – third place	2003 Manila	20 km walk

Yuan Yufang (born 1 February 1976 in Beijing, PR China) is a Malaysian naturalised race walker.

She competed at the 2000 Summer Olympics, 2004 Summer Olympics, and 2008 Summer Olympics.

== Achievements ==
Year	Competition	Venue	Position	Event	Notes
Representing Malaysia
1999	World Championships	Seville, Spain	16th	20 km	
2000	Olympic Games	Sydney, Australia	15th	20 km	
2000	Asian Championships	Jakarta, Indonesia	3rd	10,000 m	
2002	Commonwealth Games	Manchester, England	3rd	20 km	
2002	Asian Games	Busan, South Korea	6th	20 km	
2003	Asian Championships	Manila, Philippines	3rd	20 km	
2003	World Championships	Paris, France	—	20 km	DSQ
2004	Olympic Games	Athens, Greece	35th	20 km	
2008	Olympic Games	Beijing, PR China	—	20 km	DNF

== Personal life ==
Yufang is married to Li Dazhi, a doctor for the Malaysian National Sports Council athletes.
