= Osterode =

The placename Osterode can refer to:

- Osterode (district), district in Germany
- Osterode am Harz, town in Lower Saxony, Germany
- Osterode, Harztor, village in Thuringia, Germany
- Ostróda (Osterode in Ostpreußen), town in Poland
