= 2002 Sukma Games =

Multi-sport event in Sabah, Malaysia

IX Sukma Games
- Host city: Sabah
- Motto: Gemilang Di Alaf Baru (Glory in the new millennium)
- Teams: 20
- Athletes: 5324
- Events: 27 sports
- Opening: 7 September
- Closing: 14 September
- Opened by: Sakaran Dandai; Yang di-Pertua Negeri of Sabah
- Main venue: Likas Stadium
- Website: 2002 Sukma Games

The 2002 Sukma Games, officially known as the 9th Sukma Games, was a Malaysian multi-sport event held in Sabah from 7 to 14 September 2002. Perakian gymnast Ng Shu Mun, Kuala Lumpurian athlete Ngew Sin Mei and Negeri Sembilan athlete Petra Nabila Mustafa were announced as the Best Sportsman, Best Sportswoman and Most Promising Sportswoman of the event, respectively.

== Development and preparation ==
The 9th Sukma Games Organising Committee chaired by the Chief Minister of Sabah, Chong Kah Kiat, was formed to oversee the staging of the event.

=== Venues ===
The 9th Sukma Games had 19 venues for the games.

City	Competition Venue	Sports
Kota Kinabalu	Likas Stadium	Aquatics (Swimming, Diving), Football, Athletics, Archery, Karate, Squash, Hockey, Lawn bowls, Gymnastics (artistic), Badminton, Tennis
Kota Kinabalu	Ministry of Rural Development Main Hall	Weightlifting
Kota Kinabalu	Universiti Malaysia Sabah	Football
Kota Kinabalu	Sabah Foundation Sports Complex	Judo
Kota Kinabalu	Perdana Maksak Hall	Table Tennis, Gymnastics (Rhythmic)
Kota Kinabalu	Kota Kinabalu Community Hall	Boxing
Kota Kinabalu	Center Point Kota Kinabalu	Bowling
Kota Kinabalu	Industrial Training Institute Hall	Netball
Kota Kinabalu	Sabah Tshung Tsin Secondary School	Wushu
Kota Kinabalu	MUIS/Saadah Grand Hall	Silat
Kota Kinabalu	Sabah Golf&Country Club	Golf
Kota Kinabalu	Tanjung Aru Yacht Club	Sailing
Kota Kinabalu	UMS-Sulaiman-Kota Belud Highway	Cycling (Mass start)
Kota Kinabalu	Taman Tun Fuad Stephens	Cycling (Cross country and Downhill)
Kota Kinabalu	Sabah Cultural Center	Taekwondo, Fencing
Kota Kinabalu	Penampang Sports Complex	Football
Kota Kinabalu	Papar multi-purpose hall	Sepak Takraw
Kota Kinabalu	Lok Kawi Shooting Range	Shooting
Kota Kinabalu	Kadazandusun Cultural Association	Basketball

== Marketing ==
=== Logo ===
The official mascot.

The logo of the 2002 Sukma Games is an athlete in action. The circle represents the national integration through sports, the blue line that resembles the Mount Kinabalu represents the skill of the participating athletes, the yellow circle that resembles the sun represents hope and determination of athletes to succeed, while the red S represents the fighting spirit and energy of the athlete, the Sukma Games and Sabah itself and the colours on the logo represents Sabah as the state of Malaysia.

=== Mascot ===
The Mascot of the 2002 Sukma Games is a Proboscis monkey named Bayau. It is said that the Proboscis monkey is a reddish-brown arboreal Old World monkey that is endemic to the south-east Asian island of Borneo. In Sabah, it can be found in Sukau, Sg. Segama, Klias and other places in small population. Apart from having a large body size, it can swing fast from tree to tree and swimming. The adoption of the proboscis monkey is to promote eco-tourism and to create awareness about the animal.

=== Songs ===
The theme song of the 2002 Sukma Games is "Gemilang Di Alaf Baru" which means, Glory in the New Century and is eponymous to the games theme.

== The games ==
=== Participating states ===
- Johor
- Kedah
- Kelantan
- Malacca
- Negeri Sembilan
- Pahang
- Penang
- Perak
- Perlis
- Sabah
- Sarawak
- Selangor
- Terengganu
- Kuala Lumpur
- Labuan
- (Malaysia) Schools
- (Malaysia) Universities
- Police
- Brunei
- Northern Territory

=== Sports ===
- Aquatics
  - Diving
  - Swimming
- Archery
- Athletics
- Badminton
- Basketball
- Bowling
- Boxing
- Cycling
- Fencing
- Football
- Golf
- Gymnastics
- Hockey
- Judo
- Karate
- Lawn bowls
- Netball
- Sailing
- Sepak takraw
- Shooting
- Pencak silat
- Squash
- Table tennis
- Taekwondo
- Tennis
- Weightlifting
- Wushu

=== Medal table ===
* Host nation (Sabah)

2002 Sukma Games medal table
Rank	State	Gold	Silver	Bronze	Total
1	Selangor	55	40	60	155
2	Perak	49	38	42	129
3	Sarawak	35	47	60	142
4	Kuala Lumpur	31	37	29	97
5	Sabah*	28	38	46	112
6	Penang	28	38	33	99
7	Johor	28	18	42	88
8	Pahang	24	27	26	77
9	Kedah	17	15	17	49
10	Negeri Sembilan	17	12	12	41
11	Malacca	15	11	17	43
12	Kelantan	6	9	17	32
13	Perlis	3	3	7	13
14	Terengganu	3	3	5	11
15	Labuan	2	1	3	6
16	Police	2	1	2	5
17	(Malaysia) Universities	2	1	1	4
18	Brunei	1	1	3	5
19	Northern Territory	1	0	1	2
20	(Malaysia) Schools	0	1	2	3
Totals (20 entries)		347	341	425	1,113

== Broadcasting ==
Radio Televisyen Malaysia was responsible for live streaming of several events, opening and closing ceremony of the games.

Preceded by Penang	Sukma Games; Sabah; IX Sukma Games (2002)	Succeeded by Negeri Sembilan
