= Elena Goh Ling Yin =

Malaysian race walker

Elena Goh
Personal information
- Full name: Elena Goh Ling Yin
- Nationality: Malaysian
- Born: 29 April 1996 (age 30) Malacca, Malaysia
- Height: 1.57 m (5 ft 2 in)
- Weight: 43 kg (95 lb)

Sport
- Country: Malaysia
- Sport: Racewalking

Achievements and titles
- Personal best: 10,000 m: 51:42.42
Medal record
Representing Malaysia
Southeast Asian Games
| Gold medal – first place | 2017 Kuala Lumpur | 10,000 m |
| Bronze medal – third place | 2019 Philippines | 10,000 m |

Elena Goh Ling Yin (born 29 April 1996) is a Malaysian race walker. She won the gold medal in the 10,000 metres event at the 2017 Southeast Asian Games

== International competitions ==
| Year | Competition | Venue | Position | Event | Notes |
Representing Malaysia
| 2017 | Southeast Asian Games | Kuala Lumpur, Malaysia | 1st | 10,000 m | 52:21.50 |
