= Muhd Azeem Fahmi =

Malaysian sprinter (born 2004)

Personal information
- Full name: Muhammad Azeem bin Mohd Fahmi
- Born: 29 April 2004 (age 22) Teluk Intan, Perak, Malaysia
- Height: 1.80m (5 ft 11 in)
- Weight: 60.7kg (134lb)

Sport
- Country: Malaysia
- Sport: Athletics
- Event: Sprinting
- College team: Auburn Tigers
- Coached by: Muhammad Amir Izwan Tan Abdullah; Ken Harnden

Achievements and titles
- Personal bests: 100 m: 10.09 NR, NU20R (Cali 2022); 200 m: 20.83 NU20R (Cali 2022); Indoors; 60 m: 6.56 i NR (College Station 2025)
Medal record
Representing Malaysia
Event	1st	2nd	3rd
Asian Games	0	0	1
SEA Games	0	1	0
ASEAN School Games	1	2	0
Total	1	3	1
Men's athletics
Representing Malaysia
Asian Games
Bronze medal – third place	2022 Hangzhou	100 metres
Southeast Asian Games
Silver medal – second place	2021 Hanoi	4×100 m relay
ASEAN School Games
Gold medal – first place	2019 Semarang	200 m
Silver medal – second place	2019 Semarang	100 m
Silver medal – second place	2019 Semarang	4×100 m relay

Muhammad Azeem bin Mohd Fahmi (born 29 April 2004) is a Malaysian sprinter. He is the Malaysian 100 metres outdoor record holder with a time of 10.09 seconds. He holds the Malaysian national under-20 record in the 200 metres with a time of 20.83 seconds.

== Early life and education ==
Muhd Azeem Fahmi was born in Teluk Intan, Perak to Fahmi Tajuid and Norazah Ibrahim. Azeem achieved 6 A's in his SPM examinations.

In January 2023, Azeem moved to the United States to further his studies in exercise physiology and kinesiology at Auburn University, Alabama. Since his move he has been training under Zimbabwean coach Ken Harnden.

== Career ==
=== 2019 ===
Azeem won gold at the 2019 ASEAN School Games in the 200m final with a time of 21.63 seconds. In 100m final, he managed to get a silver medal with a time 10.72 seconds.

=== 2022 ===
In August 2022, he broke the national 100m record held by Khairul Hafiz Jantan at the 2022 World Athletics U20 Championships with a time of 10.09 seconds during the heats. He also went on to break his own national under-20 200m record with a time of 20.83 seconds.

=== 2023 ===
Azeem broke the men's 60m indoor sprint national record previously held by Watson Nyambek with a time of 6.63 seconds in the semi-finals of the 2023 Texas Tech Open meet and dip it down further with 6.62 seconds in Tiger Paw Invitational meet final on 11 February 2023.

On 30th September, Azeem won the bronze medal for Malaysia in the 100m final with a time of 10.11 seconds at the 2022 Asian Games in Hangzhou, China. Azeem ended Malaysian's 41-year wait for a track and field medal again after Rabuan Pit in 100m at the Asian Games.
