= Saravanan Govindasamy =

Malaysian race walker

Medal record

Men's athletics

Representing Malaysia

Asian Championships
| Bronze medal – third place | 1995 Jakarta | 20 km walk |

Govindasamy Saravanan (born 12 May 1970) is a Malaysian male race walker. He won the gold medal at the 1998 Commonwealth Games staged in his home country.

== International competitions ==
| Year | Competition | Venue | Position | Notes |
|---|---|---|---|---|
| 1995 | Asian Championships | Djakarta, Indonesia | 3rd | 50 km |
| 1997 | Southeast Asian Games | Djakarta, Indonesia | 1st | 50 km |
| 1998 | Commonwealth Games | Kuala Lumpur, Malaysia | 1st | 50 km |
| 2001 | Southeast Asian Games | Kuala Lumpur, Malaysia | 1st | 50 km |
