= Kounice =

- Market town
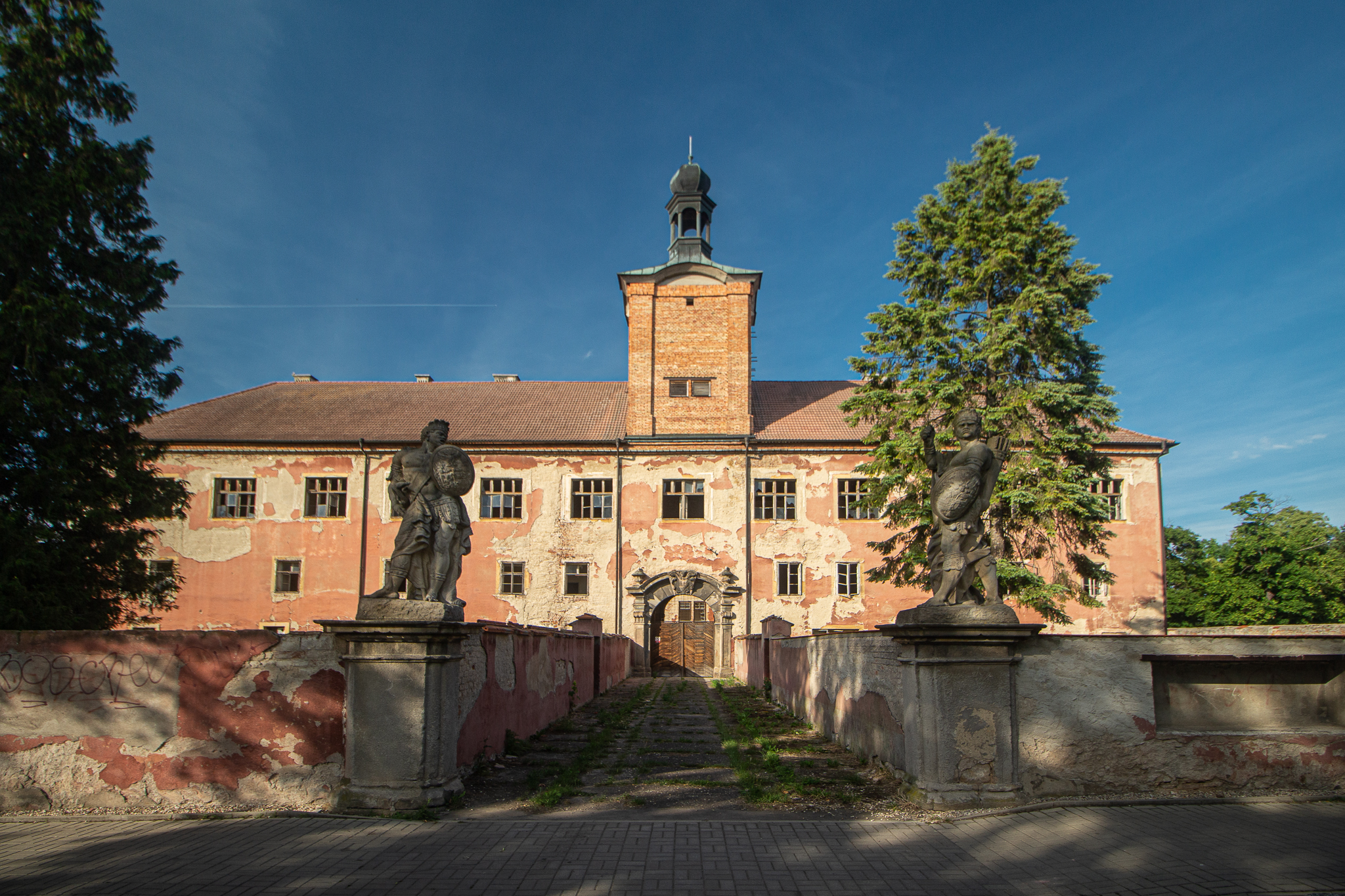
- Dilapidated Kounice Castle

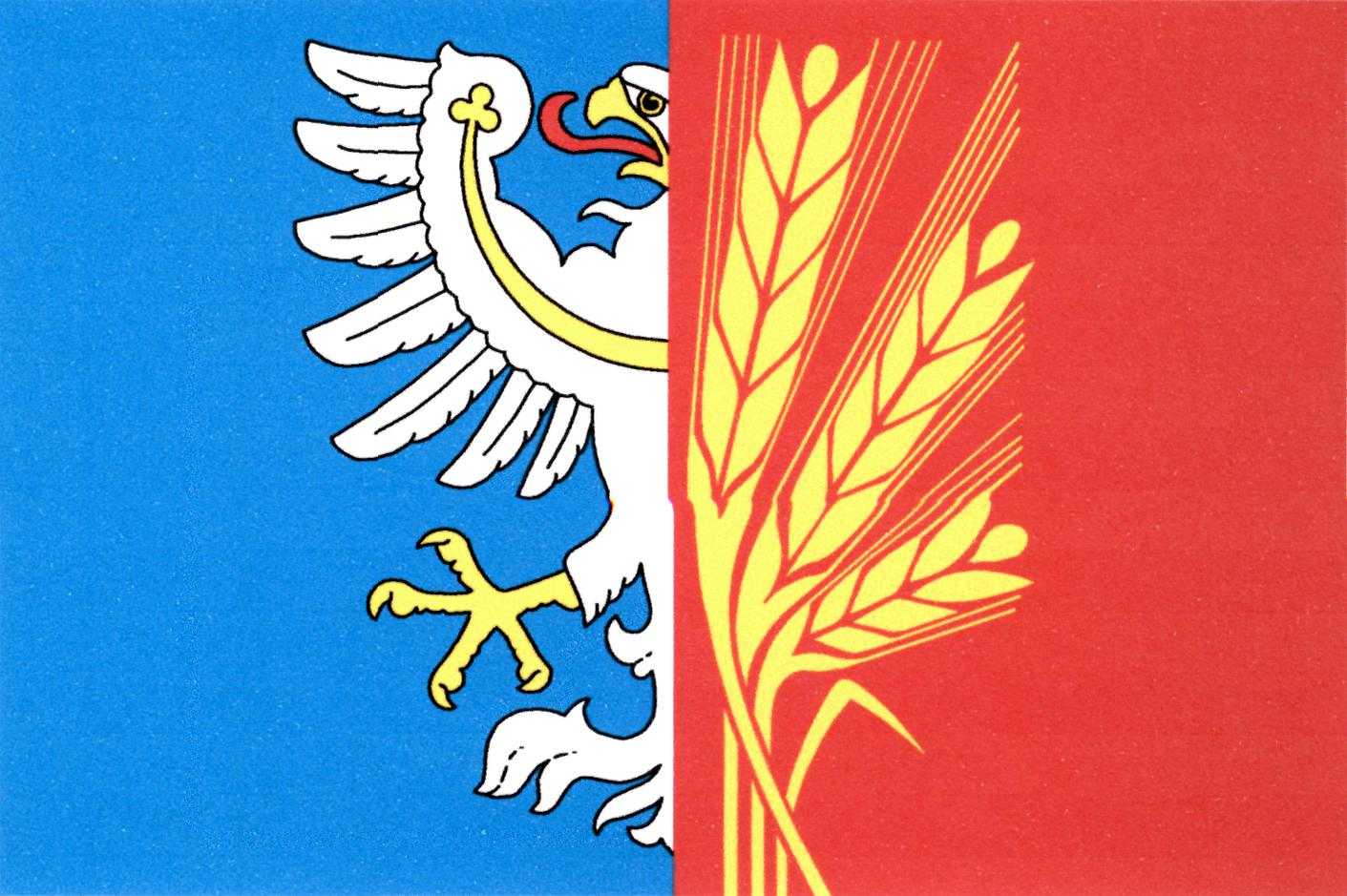
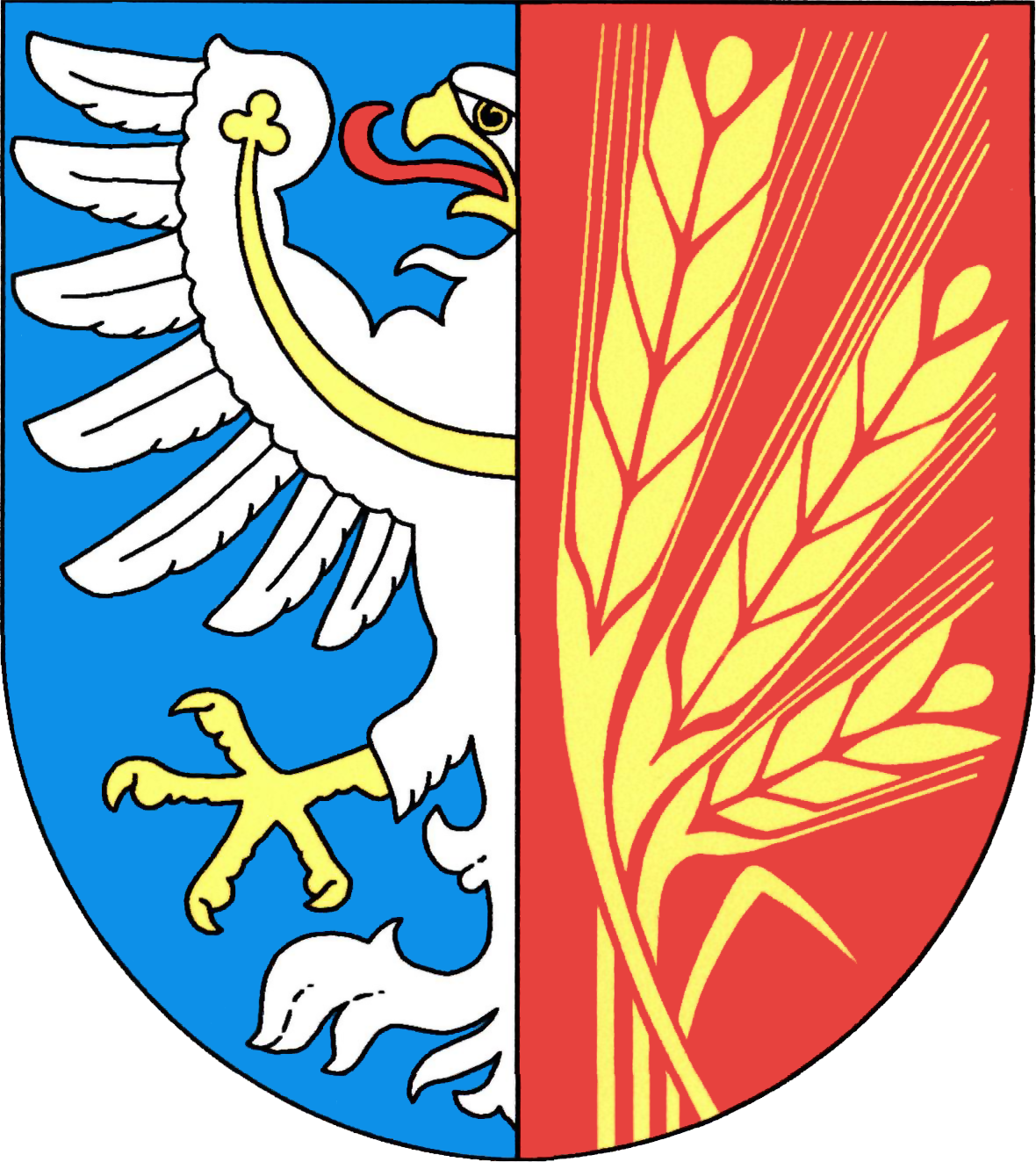
- Flag Coat of arms

- Location in the Czech Republic
- Coordinates: 50°6′28″N 14°51′22″E
- Country: Czech Republic
- Region: Central Bohemian
- District: Nymburk
- First mentioned: 1257

Area
  - Total: 11.29 km^{2} (4.36 sq mi)
- Elevation: 206 m (676 ft)

Population (2026-01-01)
  - Total: 1,755
  - Density: 155.4/km^{2} (402.6/sq mi)
- Time zone: UTC+1 (CET)
  - Summer (DST): UTC+2 (CEST)
- Postal code: 289 15
- Website: www.kounice.cz

Kounice (Czech pronunciation: [ˈkouɲɪtsɛ]; German: Kaunitz) is a market town in Nymburk District in the Central Bohemian Region of the Czech Republic. It has about 1,800 inhabitants.

== Etymology ==
The initial name of the settlement was Kónice. The name was derived from the personal name Kóna (a shortened form of Konrát, which is a Czech form of Conrad), meaning "the village of Kóna's people".

== Geography ==
Kounice is located about 15 kilometres (9 mi) southwest of Nymburk and 20 km (12 mi) east of Prague. It lies in the Central Elbe Table. The stream Kounický potok originates here and flows through the market town.

== History ==
The first written mention of Kounice is in a deed of Queen Margaret from 1257. The Renaissance fortress was built before 1554. The Liechtenstein family owned the village from 1772 until the establishment of an independent municipality. In 1871, Kounice was promoted to a market town.

== Demographics ==
Historical population

Year	Pop.	±%
1869	1,339	—
1880	1,443	+7.8%
1890	1,457	+1.0%
1900	1,308	−10.2%
1910	1,306	−0.2%

Year	Pop.	±%
1921	1,208	−7.5%
1930	1,331	+10.2%
1950	1,051	−21.0%
1961	1,059	+0.8%
1970	1,024	−3.3%

Year	Pop.	±%
1980	995	−2.8%
1991	954	−4.1%
2001	955	+0.1%
2011	1,233	+29.1%
2021	1,587	+28.7%

Source: Censuses

== Transport ==
The D11 motorway (part of the European route E67) from Prague to Hradec Králové briefly passes through the northern part of the municipal territory.

== Sights ==
One of the main landmarks of Kounice is the Church of Saint James the Great. It is an Empire style church built in 1834–1836, but it has a tower of medieval origin, which remained from the old church.

The second landmark is the Kounice Castle. It is a Baroque building with a Renaissance core. After it was destroyed by fire in 1990, only necessary repairs were carried out and the castle has been falling into disrepair ever since.
