= Přerov nad Labem =

- Municipality
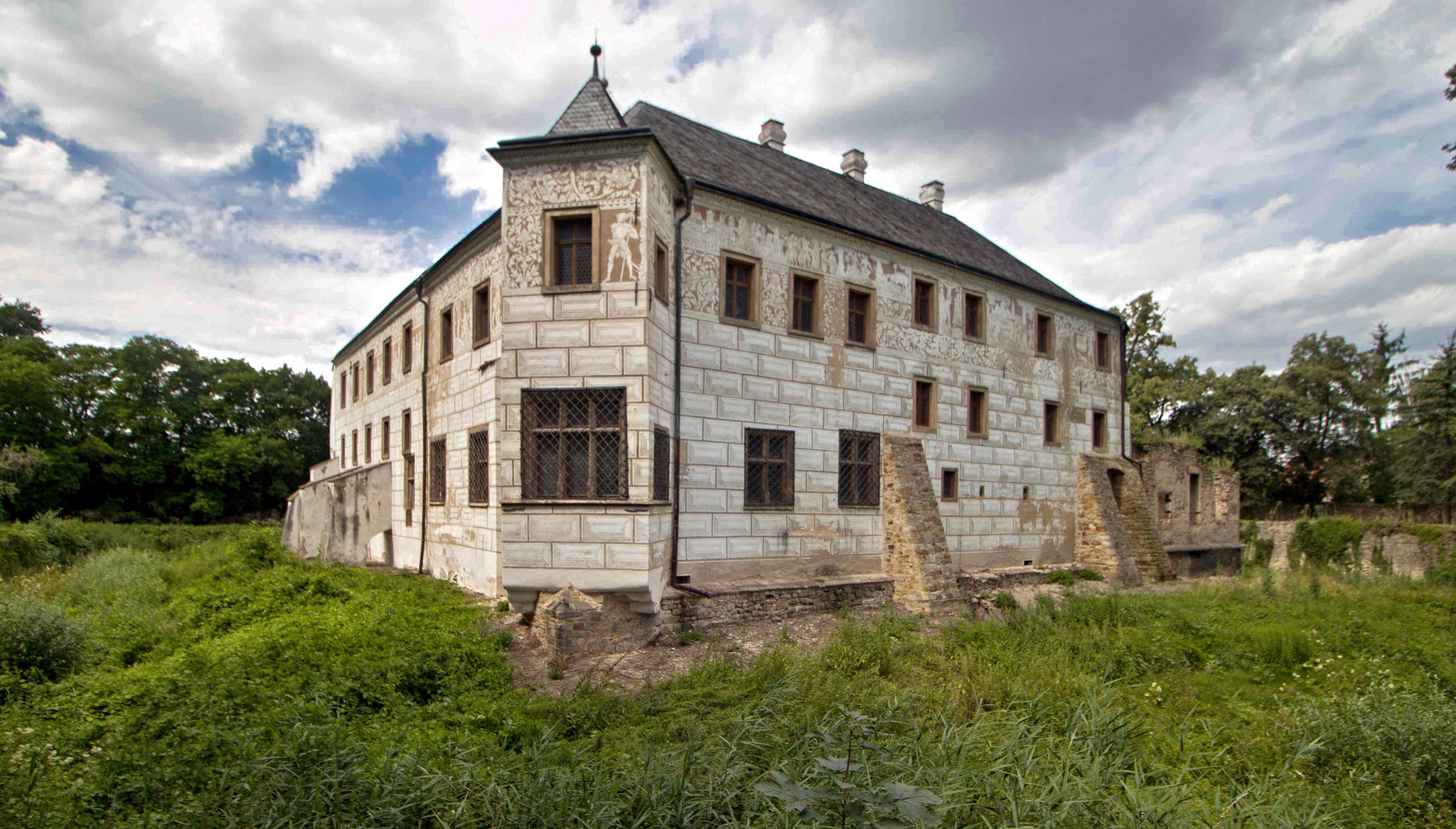
- Castle in Přerov nad Labem

- Flag Coat of arms

- Location in the Czech Republic
- Coordinates: 50°9′37″N 14°49′30″E
- Country: Czech Republic
- Region: Central Bohemian
- District: Nymburk
- First mentioned: 993

Area
  - Total: 10.66 km^{2} (4.12 sq mi)
- Elevation: 176 m (577 ft)

Population (2026-01-01)
  - Total: 1,278
  - Density: 119.9/km^{2} (310.5/sq mi)
- Time zone: UTC+1 (CET)
  - Summer (DST): UTC+2 (CEST)
- Postal code: 289 16
- Website: www.prerovnadlabem.eu

Přerov nad Labem (Czech pronunciation: [ˈpr̝̊ɛrof ˈnadlabɛm]; German: Prerow an der Elbe) is a municipality and village in Nymburk District in the Central Bohemian Region of the Czech Republic. It has about 1,300 inhabitants.

== Etymology ==
The meaning of the old Czech word přerov was 'pool', 'pond', 'stagnant water'.

== Geography ==
Přerov nad Labem is located about 15 kilometres (9 mi) west of Nymburk and 18 km (11 mi) east of Prague. It lies in the Central Elbe Table within the Polabí region. The highest point is the hill Přerovská hůra at 237 m (778 ft) above sea level. The municipality is situated on the left bank of the Elbe River, which forms the northern municipal border.

== History ==
The first written mention of Přerov nad Labem is from 993. In 1499, the village was promoted to a market town by King Vladislaus II, but it later lost the title.

== Demographics ==
Historical population

Year	Pop.	±%
1869	946	—
1880	969	+2.4%
1890	1,018	+5.1%
1900	969	−4.8%
1910	1,070	+10.4%

Year	Pop.	±%
1921	1,063	−0.7%
1930	1,172	+10.3%
1950	1,100	−6.1%
1961	1,100	+0.0%
1970	1,044	−5.1%

Year	Pop.	±%
1980	1,044	+0.0%
1991	1,028	−1.5%
2001	1,038	+1.0%
2011	1,152	+11.0%
2021	1,239	+7.6%

Source: Censuses

== Transport ==
There are no railways or major roads passing through the municipality.

== Sights ==
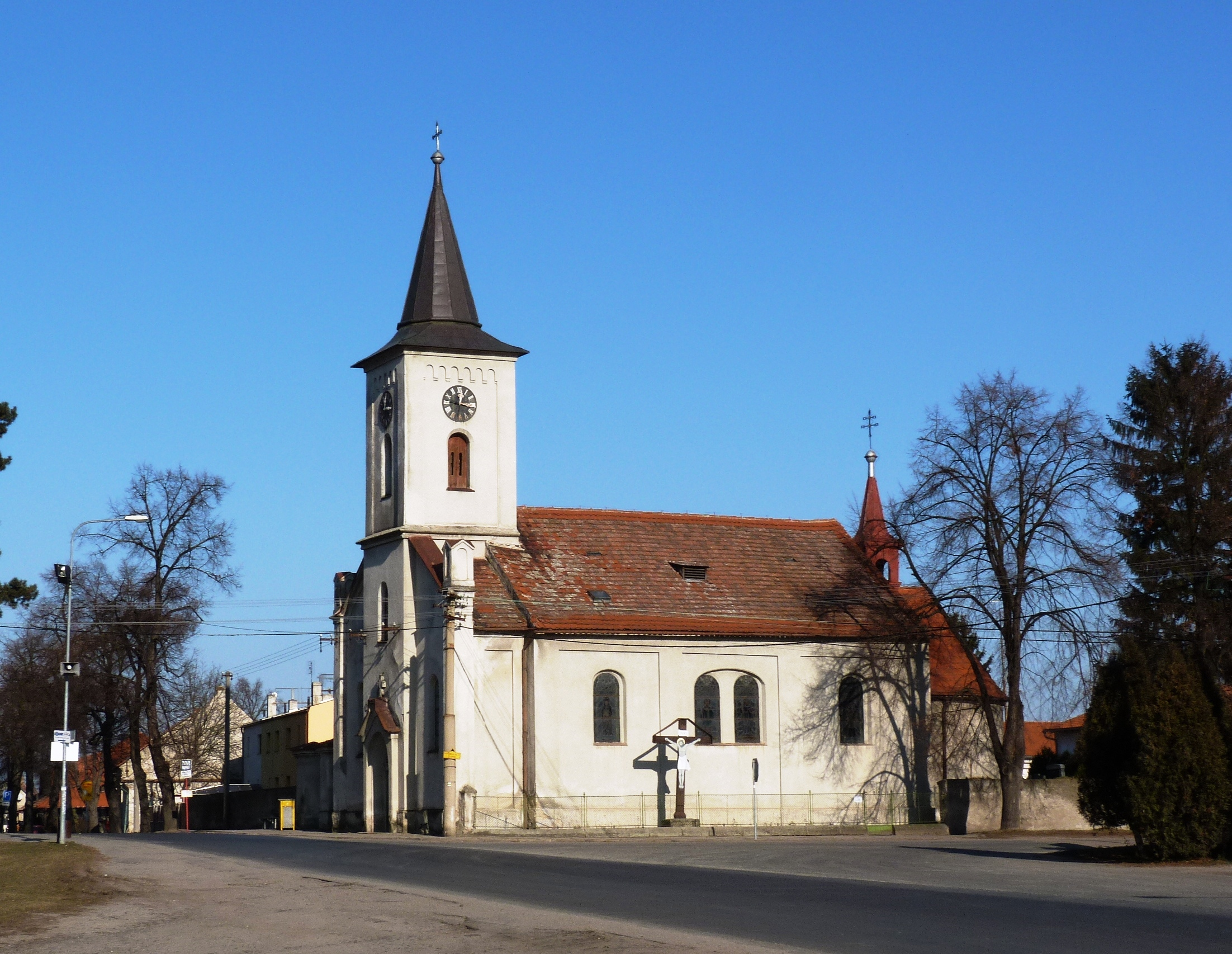
Church of Saint Adalbert

The Church of Saint Adalbert was built in the early Baroque style in 1618–1682 and was rebuilt in 1865.

The Přerov nad Labem Castle was built at the end of the 14th century as administrative seat of the Břevnov Monastery. It the 1560s it was rebuilt in the Renaissance castle. Today the building is without use and inaccessible to the public.

Přerov nad Labem is a home of one of the oldest open-air museums in Europe. It was founded by Austrian aristocrat Ludwig Salvator in 1895.

Moto & Velo Museum is a private museum with an exposition of historic bicycles and motorcycles. It was opened in 1998.
