= Canada at the 1998 Commonwealth Games =

- Flag of Canada
- CG code: CAN
- CGA: Commonwealth Sport Canada
- Website: commonwealthsport.ca

in Kuala Lumpur, Malaysia 11 September 1998 – 21 September 1998
- Flag bearer (opening): Marianne Limpert
- Flag bearer (closing): Michael Strange
- Medals Ranked 3rd: Gold 30 Silver 31 Bronze 38 Total 99

Commonwealth Games appearances (overview)
- 1930; 1934; 1938; 1950; 1954; 1958; 1962; 1966; 1970; 1974; 1978; 1982; 1986; 1990; 1994; 1998; 2002; 2006; 2010; 2014; 2018; 2022; 2026; 2030

Other related appearances
- Newfoundland (1930, 1934)

Canada competed at the 1998 Commonwealth Games in Kuala Lumpur, Malaysia from 11 to 21 September 1998. It was Canada's 16th appearance at the Commonwealth Games.

== Medallists ==
The following Canadian competitors won medals at the games. In the discipline sections below, the medalists' names are bolded.

Medal	Name	Sport	Event
Gold	Michael Strange	Boxing	Light welterweight
Gold	Jeremy Molitor	Boxing	Welterweight
Gold	Mark Simmons	Boxing	Heavyweight
Gold	Tanya Dubnicoff	Cycling	Women's sprint
Gold	Eric Wohlberg	Cycling	Men's road time trial
Gold	Lyne Bessette	Cycling	Women's individual road race
Gold	Alexandre Despatie	Diving	Men's 10 metre platform
Gold	Eryn Bulmer	Diving	Women's 3 metre springboard
Gold	Alexander Jeltkov	Gymnastics	Men's horizontal bar
Gold	Erika-Leigh Stirton	Gymnastics	Women's rhythmic clubs
Gold	Erika-Leigh Stirton	Gymnastics	Women's rhythmic hoop
Gold	Erika-Leigh Stirton	Gymnastics	Women's rhythmic ribbon
Gold	Erika-Leigh Stirton	Gymnastics	Women's rhythmic rope
Gold	Erika-Leigh Stirton	Gymnastics	Women's rhythmic individual all-around
Gold	Christina Ashcroft; Sharon Bowes	Shooting	Women's 10 metre air rifle pairs
Gold	James Paton	Shooting	Fullbore rifle Queen's Prize open singles
Gold	Metodi Igorov	Shooting	Men's 25 metre rapid fire pistol
Gold	Michel Dion; Wayne Sorensen	Shooting	Men's 50 metre rifle three positions pairs
Gold	Sharon Bowes; Christina Ashcroft	Shooting	Women's 50 metre rifle three positions pairs
Gold	Mark Versfeld	Swimming	Men's 100 metre backstroke
Gold	Mark Versfeld	Swimming	Men's 200 metre backstroke
Gold	Marianne Limpert	Swimming	Women's 200 metre individual medley
Gold	Joanne Malar	Swimming	Women's 400 metre individual medley
Gold	Valérie Hould-Marchand	Synchronised swimming	Women's solo
Gold	Kasia Kulesza; Jacinthe Taillon	Synchronised swimming	Women's duet
Gold	Sébastien Groulx	Weightlifting	Men's 69 kg snatch
Gold	Sébastien Groulx	Weightlifting	Men's 69 kg combined
Gold	Akos Sandor	Weightlifting	Men's 105 kg snatch
Gold	Akos Sandor	Weightlifting	Men's 105 kg clean and jerk
Gold	Akos Sandor	Weightlifting	Men's 105 kg combined
Silver	Arturo Huerta	Athletics	Men's 20 kilometres walk
Silver	Bradley McCuaig; Glenroy Gilbert; O'Brian Gibbons; Trevino Betty	Athletics	Men's 4 × 100 metres relay
Silver	Philomena Mensah	Athletics	Women's 100 metres
Silver	Marty O'Donnell	Boxing	Featherweight
Silver	Scott MacIntosh	Boxing	Light middleweight
Silver	Troy Ross	Boxing	Light heavyweight
Silver	Linda Jackson	Cycling	Women's road time trial
Silver	Blythe Hartley	Diving	Women's 1 metre springboard
Silver	Myriam Boileau	Diving	Women's 10 metre platform
Silver	Veronique Leeleve	Gymnastics	Women's uneven bars
Silver	Kris Burley	Gymnastics	Men's horizontal bar
Silver	Richard Ikede	Gymnastics	Men's parallel bars
Silver	Richard Ikede	Gymnastics	Men's pommel horse
Silver	Emilie Livingston; Erika-Leigh Stirton; Katie Iafolla	Gymnastics	Women's rhythmic team all-around
Silver	Sharon Bowes	Shooting	Women's 10 metre air rifle
Silver	John Rochon; Metodi Igorov	Shooting	Men's 25 metre centre-fire pistol pairs
Silver	James Paton; Alain Marion	Shooting	Fullbore rifle Queen's Prize open pairs
Silver	Joe Trinci	Shooting	Men's skeet
Silver	Wayne Sorensen	Shooting	Men's 50 metre rifle three positions
Silver	Christina Ashcroft; Maureen Spinney	Shooting	Women's 50 metre rifle prone pairs
Silver	Sharon Bowes	Shooting	Women's 50 metre rifle three positions
Silver	Jonathon Power	Squash	Men's singles
Silver	Craig Hutchison; Garret Pulle; Robbie Taylor; Stephen Clarke	Swimming	Men's 4 × 100 metre freestyle relay
Silver	Joanne Malar	Swimming	Women's 800 metre freestyle
Silver	Kelly Stefanyshyn	Swimming	Women's 100 metre backstroke
Silver	Courtenay Chuy	Swimming	Women's 200 metre breaststroke
Silver	Joanne Malar	Swimming	Women's 200 metre individual medley
Silver	Elizabeth Warden	Swimming	Women's 400 metre individual medley
Silver	Kelly Stefanyshyn; Lauren van Oosten; Marianne Limpert; Sara Alroubaie	Swimming	Women's 4 × 100 metre medley relay
Silver	Bill Rowe	Ten-pin bowling	Men's singles
Silver	Sébastien Groulx	Weightlifting	Men's 69 kg clean and jerk
Bronze	Jason Tunks	Athletics	Men's discus throw
Bronze	Mike Smith	Athletics	Men's decathlon
Bronze	Keturah Anderson	Athletics	Women's 100 metres hurdles
Bronze	Karlene Haughton	Athletics	Women's 400 metres hurdles
Bronze	Karlene Haughton; Diane Cummins; LaDonna Antoine; Foy Williams	Athletics	Women's 4 × 400 metres relay
Bronze	Trista Bernier	Athletics	Women's pole vault
Bronze	Caroline Wittrin	Athletics	Women's hammer throw
Bronze	Andrew Kooner	Boxing	Bantamweight
Bronze	Trevor Stewardson	Boxing	Middleweight
Bronze	Lori-Ann Muenzer	Cycling	Women's sprint
Bronze	Annie Gariepy	Cycling	Women's points race
Bronze	Eric Wohlberg	Cycling	Men's individual road race
Bronze	Eryn Bulmer	Diving	Women's 1 metre springboard
Bronze	Myriam Boileau	Diving	Women's 3 metre springboard
Bronze	Anne Montminy	Diving	Women's 10 metre platform
Bronze	Lise Leveille	Gymnastics	Women's balance beam
Bronze	Crystal Gilmore; Emilie Fournier; Katie Rowland; Lise Leveille; Veronique Leclerc	Gymnastics	Women's artistic team all-around
Bronze	Alexander Jeltkov; Grant Golding; Kris Burley; Peter Schmid; Richard Ikeda	Gymnastics	Men's artistic team all-around
Bronze	Emilie Livingston	Gymnastics	Women's rhythmic clubs
Bronze	John Rochon; Jean-Pierre Huot	Shooting	Men's 10 metre air pistol pairs
Bronze	John Rochon	Shooting	Men's 25 metre centre-fire pistol
Bronze	John Rochon; Jean-Pierre Huot	Shooting	Men's 50 metre free pistol pairs
Bronze	Douglas McCutcheon; Joe Trinci	Shooting	Men's skeet pairs
Bronze	Kim Eagles	Shooting	Women's 25 metre sport pistol
Bronze	Chris Renaud	Swimming	Men's 100 metre backstroke
Bronze	Greg Hamm	Swimming	Men's 200 metre backstroke
Bronze	Andrew Chan; Chris Sawbridge; Craig Hutchison; Garret Pulle; Jason Flint; Mark Versfeld; Shamek Pietucha; Stephen Clarke	Swimming	Men's 4 × 100 metre medley relay
Bronze	Jessica Deglau	Swimming	Women's 200 metre freestyle
Bronze	Joanne Malar	Swimming	Women's 400 metre freestyle
Bronze	Lauren van Oosten	Swimming	Women's 100 metre breaststroke
Bronze	Lauren van Oosten	Swimming	Women's 200 metre breaststroke
Bronze	Jessica Deglau	Swimming	Women's 200 metre butterfly
Bronze	Jessica Deglau; Laura Nicholls; Marianne Limpert; Nicole Davey	Swimming	Women's 4 × 100 metre freestyle relay
Bronze	Andrea Schwartz; Jessica Deglau; Joanne Malar; Laura Nicholls	Swimming	Women's 4 × 200 metre freestyle relay
Bronze	Warren Rennox	Ten-pin bowling	Men's singles
Bronze	Bill Rowe; Jane Amlinger	Ten-pin bowling	Mixed doubles
Bronze	Alain Bilodeau	Weightlifting	Men's 77 kg clean and jerk
Bronze	Alain Bilodeau	Weightlifting	Men's 77 kg combined

== Cricket ==
Canada named the below squad for the tournament.

Roster

- Ingleton Liburd (c)
- George Codrington
- Muneeb Diwan
- Derick Etwaroo
- Joseph Harris
- Nigel Isaacs
- Davis Joseph
- Paul Prashad
- Brian Rajadurai
- Danny Ramnarais (wk)
- Barry Seebaran
- Sanjayan Thuraisingam
- Anand Varadarajan

Summary

Team	Event	Group stage				Semifinal	Final / BM	
Team	Event	Opposition Result	Opposition Result	Opposition Result	Rank	Opposition Result	Opposition Result	Rank
Canada men	Men's tournament	Australia; L by 9 wickets	India; L by 112 runs	Antigua and Barbuda; L by 121 runs	4	did not advance		15

Group stage

Group B
Pos	Team	Pld	W	L	T	NR	Pts	NRR
1	Australia	3	3	0	0	0	6	3.299
2	Antigua and Barbuda	3	1	1	0	1	3	0.079
3	India	3	1	1	0	1	3	−0.340
4	Canada	3	0	3	0	0	0	−2.558

Source: ESPNcricinfo

9 September 1998
10:00
Scorecard

Canada; 60 (20 overs)	v	Australia; 61/1 (14 overs)
Muneeb Diwan 14; Damien Fleming 4/21 (6 overs)		Mark Waugh 24*; Sanjayan Thuraisingam 1/14 (5 overs)

Australia won by 9 wickets
Perbadanan Kemajuan Negeri Selangor Sports Complex, Petaling Jaya
Umpires: Dave Orchard (SA) and William Smith (Sco)

- Australia won the toss and elected to field.
- Danny Ramnarais (Can) made his List A debut.
- Points: Australia 2, Canada 0.

12 September 1998
10:00
Scorecard

India; 157/9 (50 overs)	v	Canada; 45 (23.5 overs)
Amay Khurasiya 83 (136); Davis Joseph 2/18 (8 overs)		Joseph Harris 13 (20); Anil Kumble 4/11 (6.5 overs)

India won by 112 runs
Victoria Institution, Kuala Lumpur
Umpires: Ismail Khan (Mas) and Steve Bucknor (Jam)

- Canada won the toss and elected to field.
- Points: India 2, Canada 0.
- Canada were eliminated as a result of this match.

14 September 1998
10:00
Scorecard

Antigua and Barbuda; 256/7 (50 overs)	v	Canada; 135 (31.3 overs)
Anthony Lake 54; Ingleton Liburd 1/41 (7 overs)		Joseph Harris 48; Anthony Lake 4/17 (4.3 overs)

Antigua and Barbuda won by 121 runs
Royal Selangor Club, Kuala Lumpur
Umpires: K. T. Francis (SL) and Syed Mahabubullah (Ban)

- Antigua and Barbuda won the toss and elected to bat.
- Anthony Lake (Ant) made his List A debut.
- Nigel Isaacs (Can) played his only List A match.
- Hayden Walsh Sr., Richie Richardson, Winston Benjamin (Ant) and Anand Varadarajan, Ingleton Liburd, Derick Etwaroo, Danny Ramnarais (Can) all played their final List A match.
- Kenny Benjamin (Ant) took his 100th List A wicket.
- Points: Antigua and Barbuda 2, Canada 0.

== Netball ==
Squad

- Kimberly Anderson
- Joanne Burns
- Shirley-Anne George
- Shawnette Hardware
- Shernette Hardware
- Maria Hodgins
- Marina Leigertwood
- Kristine Spekkens
- Nicola Steiner
- Shelley Sung
- Keisha Wilson

Summary

Canada finished 10th in the netball at the 1998 Commonwealth Games. In the group stages, they won just one of their five matches.

Group A

14 September 1998	Jamaica	74–36	Canada

15 September 1998	Australia	85–25	Canada

16 September 1998	England	62–32	Canada

17 September 1998	Barbados	57–44	Canada

18 September 1998	Malaysia	28–58	Canada

Pos	Team	P	W	D	L	GF	GA	GD	Pts
1	Australia	5	5	0	0	377	145	+232	10
2	England	5	4	0	1	257	197	+60	8
3	Jamaica	5	3	0	2	317	223	-94	6
4	Barbados	5	2	0	3	219	267	-48	4
5	Canada	5	1	0	4	195	306	-111	2
6	Malaysia	5	0	0	5	120	347	-227	0

Qualified for Semi-final 1
Qualified for Semi-final 2
