= Synchronised swimming at the 1998 Commonwealth Games =

- Venue: National Aquatic Centre, Bukit Jalil
- Location: Kuala Lumpur, Malaysia
- Dates: 12 to 17 September 1998

Synchronised swimming at the 1998 Commonwealth Games was the fourth appearance of Synchronised swimming at the Commonwealth Games. Competition was held in Kuala Lumpur, Malaysia, from 11 to 21 September 1998.

The synchronised swimming events were held at the National Aquatic Centre in Bukit Jalil, which is found in an area called the KL Sports City. The aquatic centre was specifically constructed for the Games and consisted of a 28,000 metre squared footprint and seating for 4,000 spectators.

There were just two medal events, both for women. Canada topped the medal table by virtue of winning both gold medals.

National Aquatic Centre in Bukit Jalil

== Medal table ==
Rank	Nation	Gold	Silver	Bronze	Total
1	Canada	2	0	0	2
2	Australia	0	2	0	2
3	England	0	0	2	2
Totals (3 entries)		2	2	2	6

== Medallists ==
=== Women's events only ===
Event	Gold		Silver		Bronze	
Solo	Valérie Hould-Marchand; Canada	93.64	Naomi Young; Australia	90.933	Gayle Adamson; England	
Duet	Kasia Kulesza; Jacinthe Taillon; Canada	93.824	Irena Olevsky; Naomi Young; Australia	91.077	Adele Carlsen; Katie Hooper; England	87.13
