= Perodua Alza (first generation) =

Malaysian B-segment multi-purpose vehicle

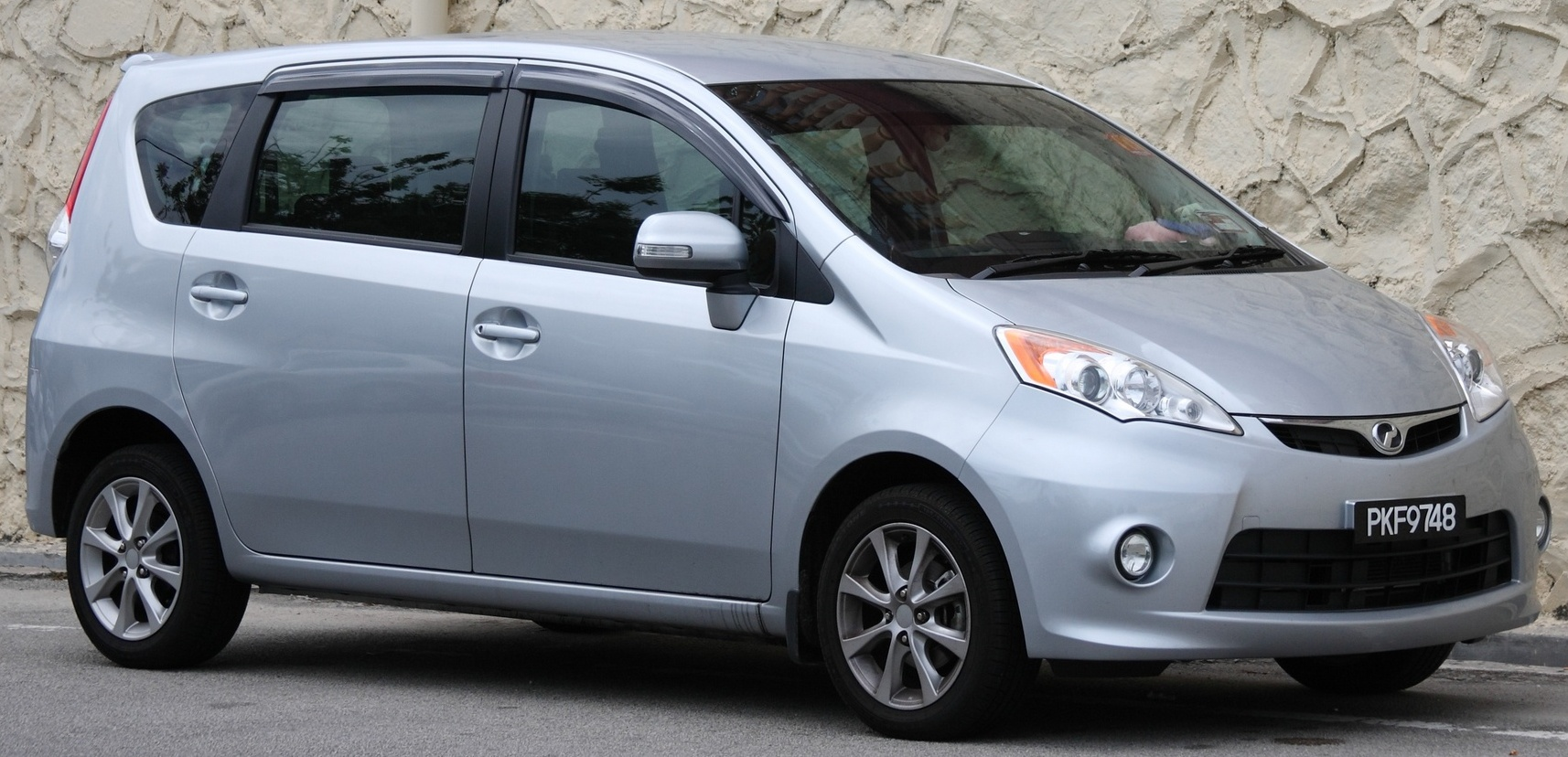
- Perodua Alza (M502G)

Overview
- Manufacturer: Perodua
- Model code: M500
- Also called: Daihatsu Boon Luminas; Toyota Passo Sette
- Production: November 2009 – May 2022
- Assembly: Malaysia: Rawang, Selangor (PMSB)

Body and chassis
- Class: Mini MPV
- Body style: 5-door wagon
- Layout: Front-engine, front-wheel-drive
- Related: Daihatsu Boon; Perodua Myvi (M300)

Powertrain
- Engine: Petrol: 1.5 L 3SZ-VE I4
- Transmission: 5-speed manual; 4-speed automatic

Dimensions
- Wheelbase: 2,750 mm (108.3 in)
- Length: 4,205 mm (165.6 in)
- Width: 1,695 mm (66.7 in)
- Height: 1,620 mm (63.8 in)
- Kerb weight: 1,120–1,170 kg (2,469–2,579 lb)

Chronology
- Successor: Perodua Alza (W151)

The M500 series Perodua Alza is the first generation of Alza B-segment multi-purpose vehicle (MPV) produced by Malaysian car manufacturer Perodua. Based on the Daihatsu Boon Luminas, it was launched in November 2009 as the company's first purpose-built MPV.

The production of M500 series Alza ended in 2022 before being replaced by the W100 series Daihatsu Xenia-based model.

== History ==
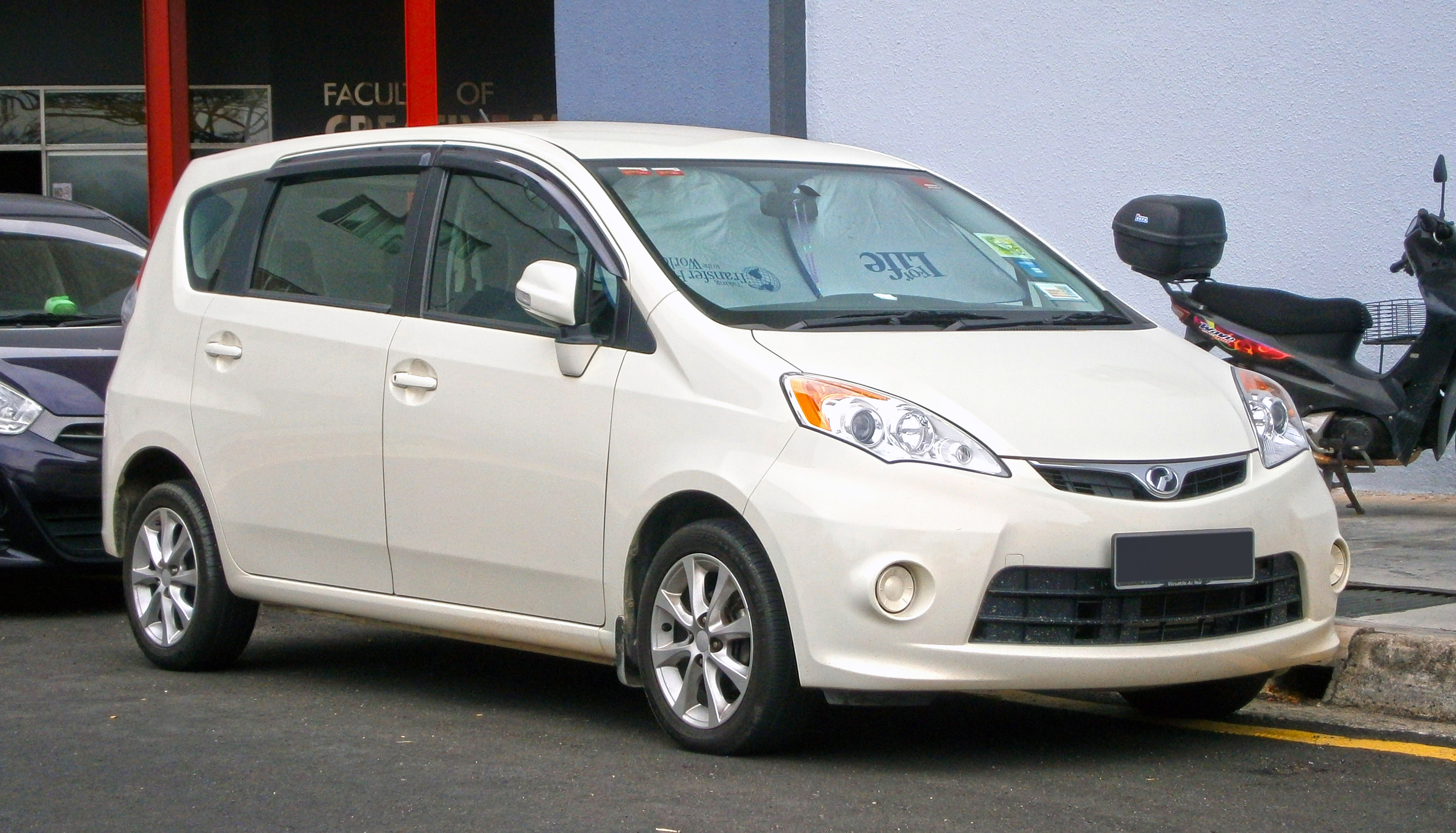
Front view (pre-facelift)

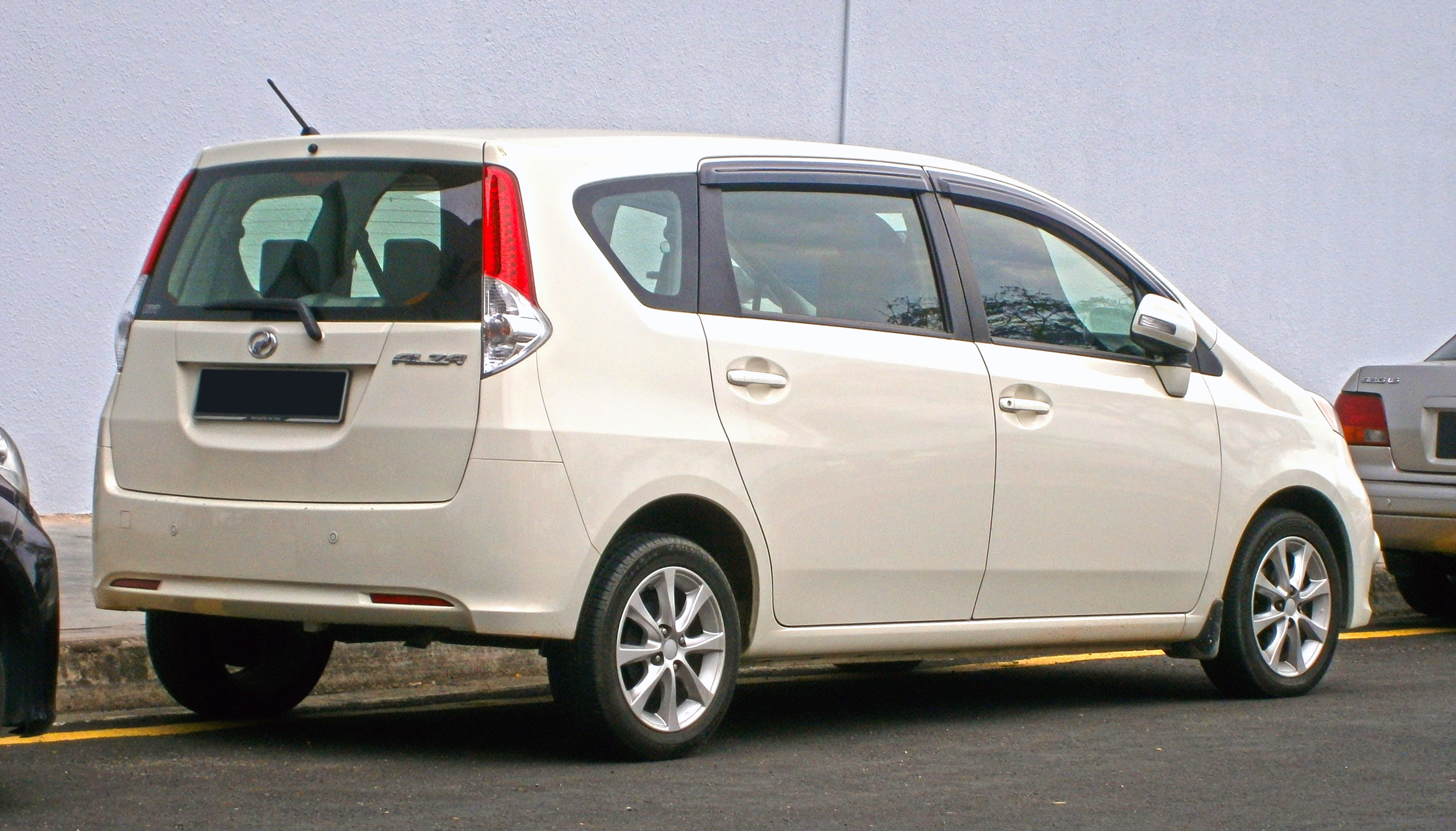
Rear view (pre-facelift)

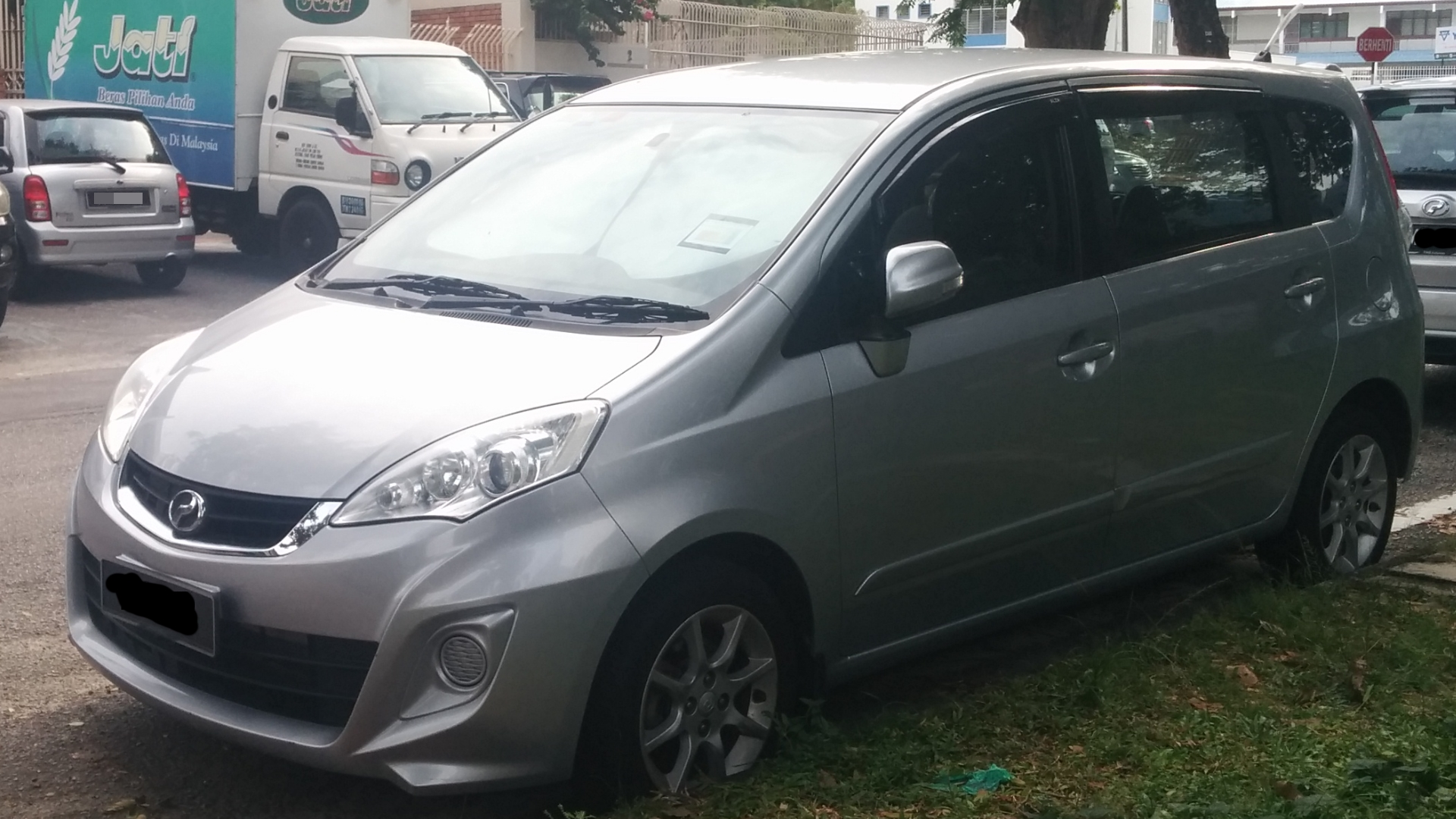

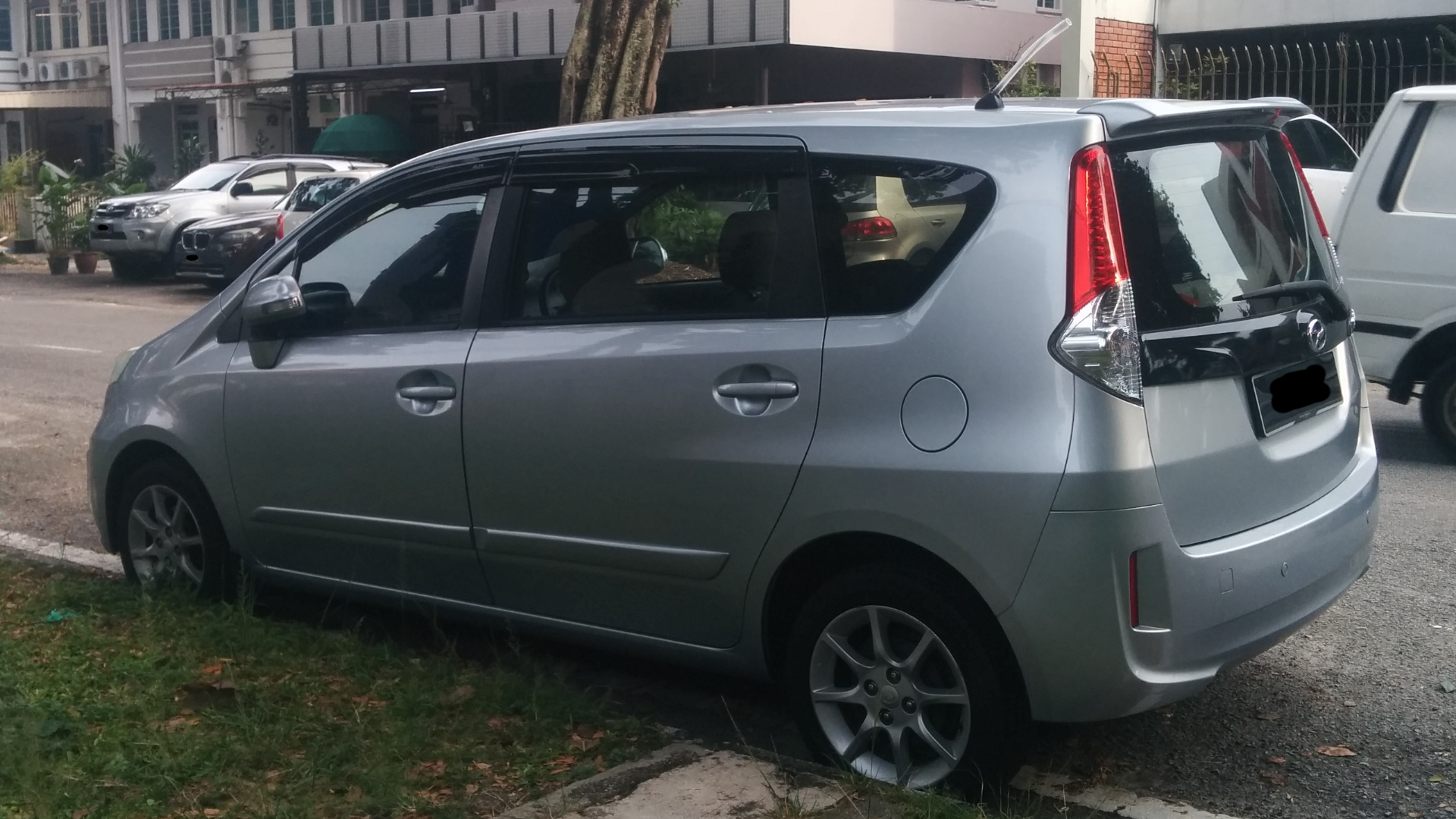
First facelift

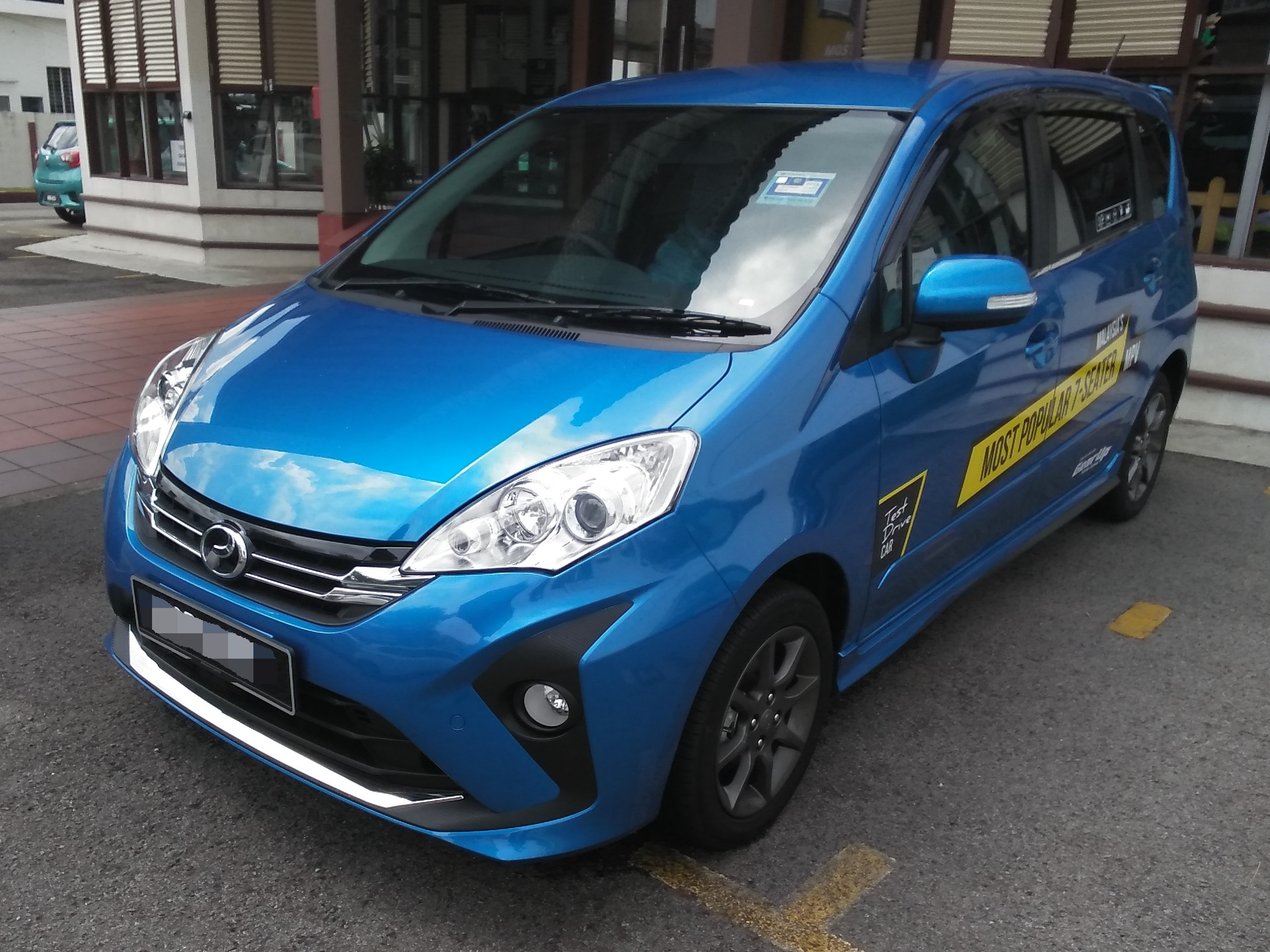

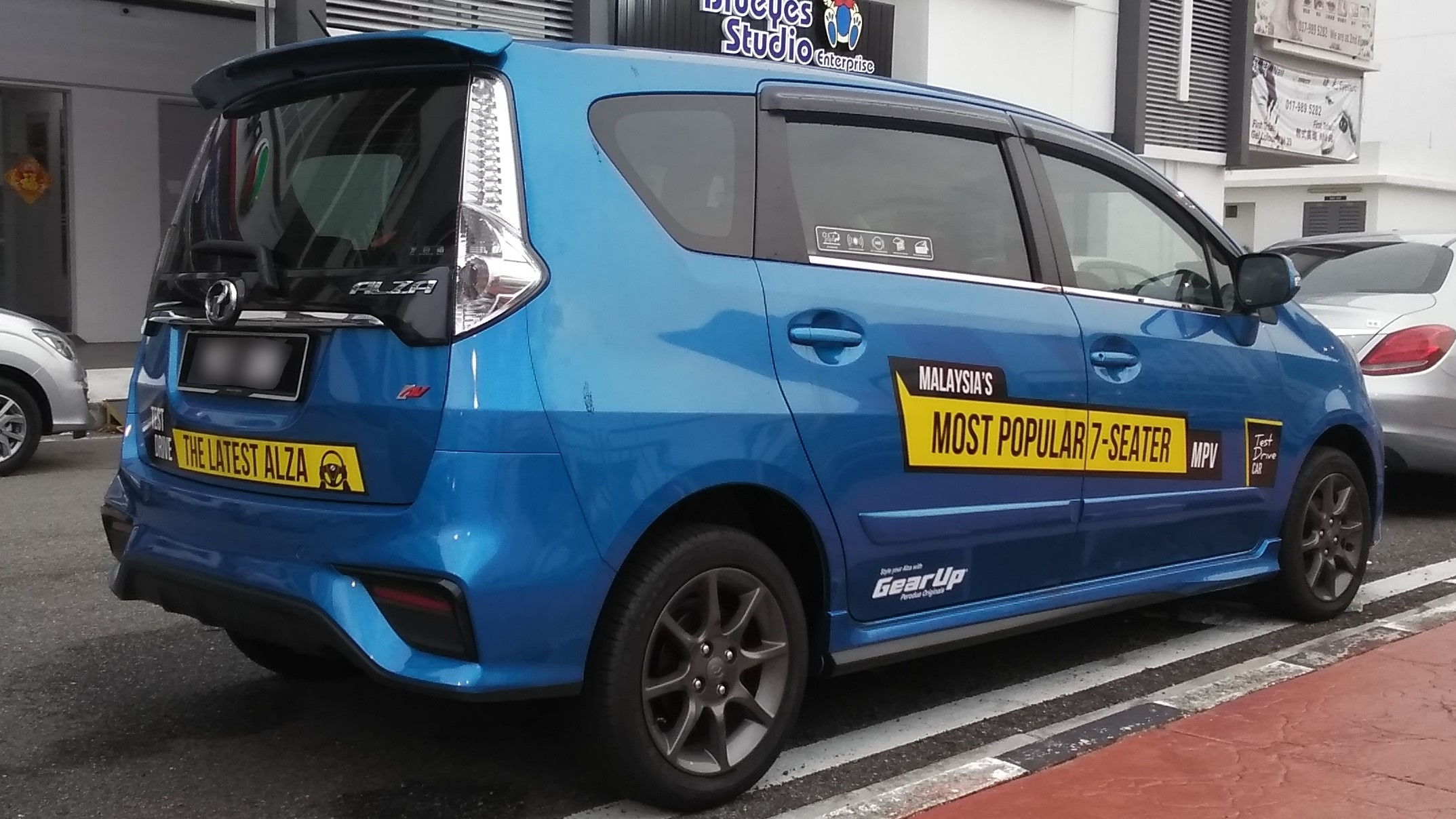
Second facelift

Perodua launched the first-generation Alza on 23 November 2009 in two variants, 1.5 Standard (EZ and SX) and Premium (EZi and SXi), both available with either manual or automatic transmission. It became the best-selling MPV in Malaysia for 2010 by total sales of nearly 42,000 units, beating rival Proton Exora by a margin of 15,000 units. The average number of Alza sales per month is around 2,800 units.

In March 2010, the range-topping Advanced model (ZHV) joined the range. Booking opened the same time as the regular 1.5 Standard and Premium variant, but only started delivery in March 2010. The Advance variant added a bodykit consisting of front, rear and side skirts and a rear spoiler, leather seat covers for all the seats, a 5-inch touchscreen LCD and a 150-degree reverse camera.

In March 2011, Perodua launched a limited edition of the Perodua Alza, the M2 Edition. It's based on the Advance model and featured custom leather seat covers, custom carpet mats, “M2” grade mark and a special color called “Midnight Blue”. It was priced at the same price of the Perodua Alza Advance.

In February 2012, Perodua launched an even more base model called SR (BX and BZ), priced lower than the Standard variant. UV protection is only available on the front and main windscreen and there is no rear wiper and no rear spoiler. In terms of safety, there are no fog lamps, airbags, ABS, EBD, or BA.

In July 2012, Perodua launched an updated Perodua Alza Advanced variant. While prices remained the same as the previous Advance variant, the main change was the 6" infotainment system which includes GPS navigation, reverse camera and supports mini USB, SD cards, DVD, bluetooth and MP3/WM.

In March 2013, Perodua launched the Alza S alongside the Perodua Viva S and Perodua Myvi 1.3 SE. The Alza S replaced the Standard variant. The 'S' stands for special. In addition to the kit previously offered on the Perodua Alza Standard variant, it added front fog lamps, leather wrapped steering wheel, rear spoiler, chrome door handles (inside) and painted door arm rests.

=== First facelift ===
In January 2014, Perodua launched the facelifted Alza in three variants; the Standard (MT & AT), SE (Special Edition, MT & AT) and Advanced Version (AT only). The Alza received several cosmetic changes, including a revised front grille, front bumper, rear bumper and new alloy wheels, while the Advanced variant received a multimedia system with navigation and reverse camera. The engine and transmission pairing remained unchanged. It was available in five colors: Ivory White, Ebony Black, Glittering Silver, Mystical Purple and Passion Red.

On 19 September 2015, alongside the Perodua Myvi XS, Perodua launched the Perodua Alza S. The Perodua Alza S replaces the Standard variant. It adds the SE-style bodykit, clear tail lamps and front fog lamps. The interior features a leather-wrapped steering wheel with audio switches, an audio system with USB and Bluetooth connectivity and meter panel with white illumination. The Perodua Alza S gets an exclusive Metallic Electric Blue paint option. Prices remained unchanged from the Perodua Alza Standard variant despite the added features.

=== Second facelift ===
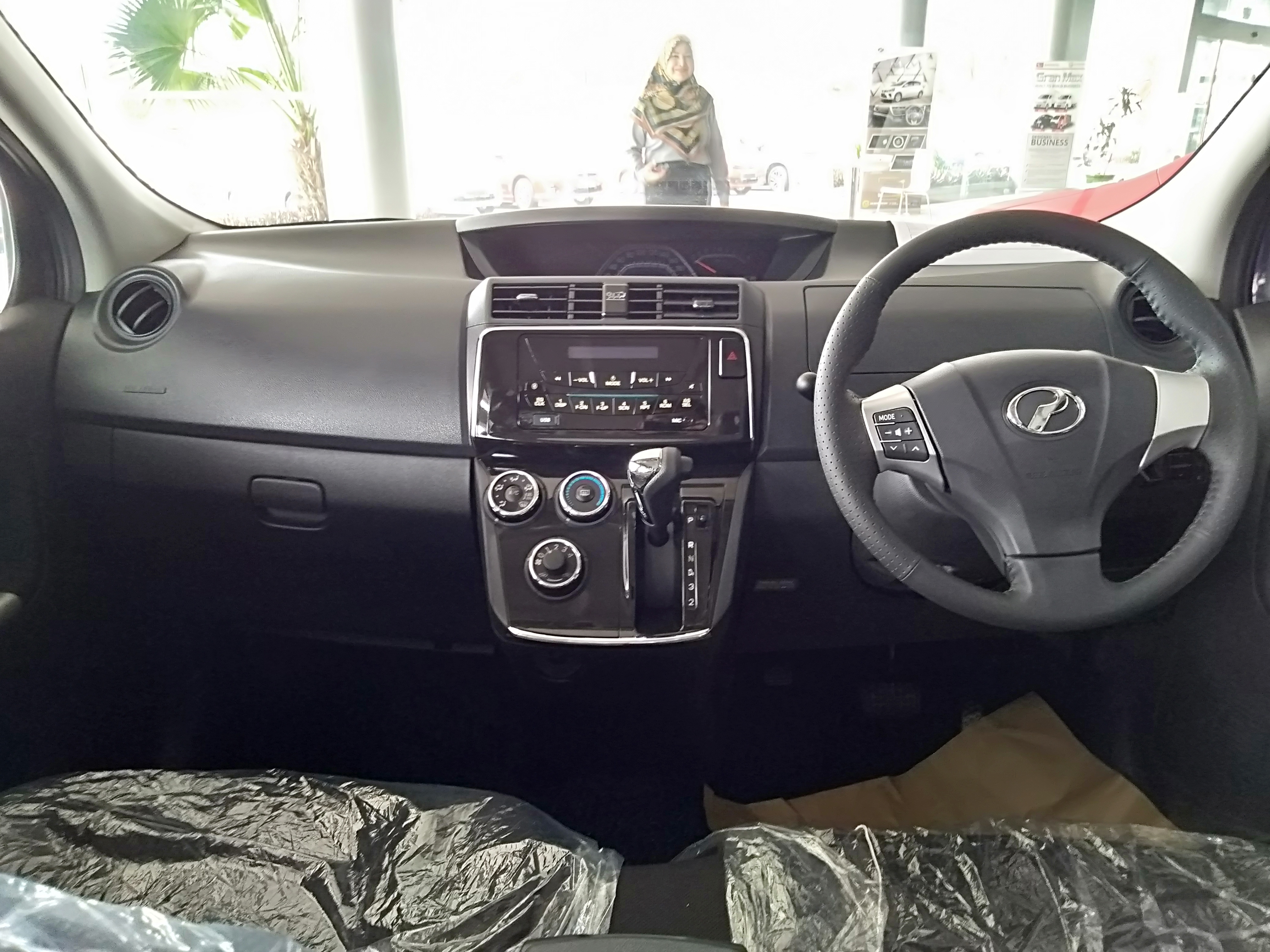
2021 Perodua Alza 1.5 SE interior (Brunei)

On 5 September 2018, a second facelift was launched. Three variants were retained: Standard (MT & AT), SE (AT only), and Advance (AT only). However, the cosmetic upgrades were reserved solely for the SE and Advance variants. These upgrades included a redesigned front bumper with a larger lower intake, a new front grille featuring two bars, new side skirts, a new rear bumper, and a redesigned tailgate garnish. The Standard variant gained ABS as standard. Across the range, this second facelift introduced redesigned instrument panel graphics, a new-look centre cluster, a two-motion remote control key, fixed fins between the front centre air vents, an improved evaporator, and enhanced heat-exchange piping. The SE and Advance variants featured redesigned leather seats and new front corner sensors. The Advance variant received a new Android-based touchscreen head unit with Smart Link, Bluetooth, navigation, and reverse camera functions, while the Standard and SE variants were equipped with a new head unit that included USB and Bluetooth functionality.

By 2022, Perodua had sold more than 400,000 Alza's.

== Safety ==
The first-generation Alza achieved a 4-star ASEAN NCAP rating.

ASEAN NCAP test results Perodua Alza (2013)
Test	Points	Stars
Adult occupant:	12.86	4 /5 stars
Child occupant:	46%	0 /5 stars
Safety assist:	NA	

== Quality issues ==
After its initial release, the Alza received numerous negative comments from owners regarding its build quality and workmanship. The posted complaints included: brake pads releasing excessive brake dust during use; faulty disc brakes; poor sound insulation at speeds exceeding 70 km/h; petrol fumes detected after refueling; inadequate roof insulation, particularly on rainy days; broken door levers; unusual sounds emanating from the air-conditioning system; excessive heat build-up at the rear right seat; steering rack vibrations and noises on uneven roads; and water entering through the front headlamps. Additionally, uneven paint caused the exterior to scratch and chip easily, and uneven rustproofing has also been reported.

Up until early 2012, Perodua had not issued any recalls for the Alza. In May 2012, Perodua announced a recall for both the Alza and its first-generation pre-facelifted hatchback, the MyVi, to address an extension of an air-conditioning pipe that could potentially cause rust on the steering rack.

In October 2014, viral photos showing the rear axle of the new Alza dismantled began to circulate. In response, Perodua stated that the situation was due to an accident and that neither faulty parts nor other quality issues were to blame. They threatened legal action against those who disseminated the photos.

== Exports ==
=== Brunei ===
Since 2016, Perodua's official distributor in Brunei, GHK Motors Sdn Bhd launched the first facelifted Alza in 1.5 SE variant only with the 4-speed automatic or 5-speed manual transmissions.

The Alza's 1.5 SE as the second facelift model was launched on 3 May 2019.

== Sales ==
Year	Malaysia (Note: Figures based on registration)
2009	2,849
2010	41,934
2011	37,400
2012	41,381
2013	46,036
2014	55,320
2015	39,336
2016	35,046
2017	28,034
2018	24,389
2019	15,337
2020	14,691
2021	14,828
2022	24,240
