= Malaysian motor vehicle import duties =

Malaysian motor vehicle import duties is an article describing the excise duty on imported vehicles into the country.

== Background ==
Malaysia's car industry is dominated by two local manufacturers which are heavily supported by the government through National Car Policy e.g. trade barriers. These local manufacturers are Proton and Perodua. These excise duties imposed on foreign manufactured cars have made them very expensive for consumers in Malaysia. These taxes are also one of the highest in the world. This makes most foreign cars extremely expensive for buyers, although cheaper in other countries. These taxes cause a foreign car to cost almost three times or 200% more than the original price.

== Notation ==
- CBU = Complete built up
- CKD = Complete knock down
- MFN = Most favoured nation
- ASEAN CEPT = Association of Southeast Asian Nations Common Effective Preferential Tariff

== Passenger cars (including station wagons, sports cars and racing cars) ==
	Import duty				Local taxes	
	CBU		CKD		CBU & CKD	
Engine; Capacity (cc)	MFN	ASEAN; CEPT	MFN	ASEAN; CEPT	Excise; Duties	Sales; Tax
< 1,800	30%	0%	10%	0%	75%	10%
1,800 - 1,999	30%	0%	10%	0%	80%	10%
2,000 - 2,499	30%	0%	10%	0%	90%	10%
Above 2,500	30%	0%	10%	0%	105%	10%

Source: http://maa.org.my/pdf/malaysia_duties_taxes_on_motor_vehicles.pdf

== Four-wheel-drive vehicles ==
	Import duty				Local taxes	
	CBU		CKD		CBU & CKD	
Engine; Capacity (cc)	MFN	ASEAN; CEPT	MFN	ASEAN; CEPT	Excise; Duties	Sales; Tax
< 1,800	30%	0%	10%	0%	65%	10%
1,800 - 1,999	30%	0%	10%	0%	75%	10%
2,000 - 2,499	30%	0%	10%	0%	90%	10%
Above 2,500	30%	0%	10%	0%	105%	10%

Source: http://maa.org.my/pdf/malaysia_duties_taxes_on_motor_vehicles.pdf

== Others (MPV & VAN) ==
	Import duty				Local taxes	
	CBU		CKD		CBU & CKD	
Engine; Capacity (cc)	MFN	ASEAN; CEPT	MFN	ASEAN; CEPT	Excise; Duties	Sales; Tax
< 1,500	30%	0%	nil	0%	60%	10%
1,500 - 1,799	30%	0%	10%	0%	65%	10%
1,800 - 1,999	30%	0%	10%	0%	75%	10%
2,000 - 2,499	30%	0%	10%	0%	90%	10%
Above 2,500	30%	0%	10%	0%	105%	10%

Source: http://maa.org.my/pdf/malaysia_duties_taxes_on_motor_vehicles.pdf

== Commercial vehicles ==
	Import duty				Local taxes	
	CBU		CKD		CBU & CKD	
Class	MFN	ASEAN; CEPT	MFN	ASEAN; CEPT	Excise; Duties	Sales; Tax
All	30%	0%	nil	0%	nil	10%

Source: http://maa.org.my/pdf/malaysia_duties_taxes_on_motor_vehicles.pdf

== Motorcycles ==
	Import duty				Excise Duties	Sales Tax	
	CBU		CKD		CBU&CKD	CBU	CKD
Engine; Capacity (cc)	MFN	ASEAN; CEPT	MFN	ASEAN; CEPT	All	All	All
<151	30%	5%	0%	0%	20%	0%	0%
151 - 200	30%	5%	0%	0%	30%	0%	0%
201 - 250	30%	5%	5%	0%	30%	0%	0%
251 - 500	30%	5%	5%	0%	30%	10%	0%
Above 500	30%	5%	10%	0%	30%	10%	0%

Source: http://maa.org.my/pdf/malaysia_duties_taxes_on_motor_vehicles.pdf

== See also ==
- Automotive industry in Malaysia
