= Ten-pin bowling at the Commonwealth Games =

Ten-pin bowling at the Commonwealth Games was held just once at the 1998 Commonwealth Games in Kuala Lumpur, Malaysia. The sport was introduced for the Games because it was very popular in Malaysia and parts of Asia. However the sport was dropped four years later and has not returned.

== Editions ==
Games	Year	Host city	Host country	Best nation
XVI	1998	Kuala Lumpur	Malaysia	Australia

== All-time medal table ==
Rank	Nation	Gold	Silver	Bronze	Total
1	Australia	3	1	1	5
2	Malaysia	2	1	1	4
3	Canada	0	1	2	3
4	England	0	1	1	2
5	Bermuda	0	1	0	1
Totals (5 entries)		5	5	5	15
