= Naomi Young =

Australian synchronized swimmer

Personal information
- Nationality: Australian
- Born: March 25, 1976 (age 50)

Sport
- Sport: Swimming
- Strokes: Synchronized swimming
Medal record
Representing Australia
Women's synchronized swimming
Commonwealth Games
Silver medal – second place	1998 Kuala Lumpur	Solo
Silver medal – second place	1998 Kuala Lumpur	Duet
Bronze medal – third place	2002 Manchester	Solo
Bronze medal – third place	2002 Manchester	Duet

Naomi Young (born 25 March 1976) is an Australian synchronized swimmer who competed in the 2000 Summer Olympics.

She competed at the 1998 Commonwealth Games, winning a silver medal in the duet event, and at the 2002 Commonwealth Games where she won bronze medals in the duet and solo events.
