= Sarah Collings =

British swimmer (born 1978)

Personal information
- Full name: Sarah Louise Collings
- National team: Great Britain
- Born: May 1978 (age 48)

Sport
- Sport: Swimming
- Strokes: freestyle
- Club: City of Bradford and University of Bath
- Coach: Ian Armiger and Ian Turner
Medal record
Swimming
Representing England
Commonwealth Games
Bronze medal – third place	1998 Kuala Lumpur	800m freestyle
European Short Course Swimming Championships
Bronze medal – third place	1996 Rostock	800m freestyle
Bronze medal – third place	1998 Sheffield	800m freestyle
European Masters Swimming Championships
Gold medal – first place	2016 London	400m freestyle
Gold medal – first place	2016 London	800m freestyle
Silver medal – second place	2016 London	200m freestyle

Sarah Louise Collings (born May 1978) is a female English and British former competitive swimmer and six times British champion.

== Swimming career ==
Collings made her senior international debut at 1997 European Aquatics Championships in Seville. where she finished in 7th.

Collings represented England and won a bronze medal in the 800 metres freestyle event, at the 1998 Commonwealth Games in Kuala Lumpur, Malaysia.

She is a four times champion of the ASA National Championship over 800 metres freestyle in 1994, 1996, 1998 and 1999. She is also a one time winner of the 200 metres title and the 400 metres title in 1996.

Sarah represented Great Britain at the European Short Course Swimming Championships in 1996, 1998 and 1999 and won bronze medals in 1996 and 1998. She also represented Great Britain at the World Short Course Championships in 1997 and 1999, finishing in the Top 8 both times.

At Masters level in 2016 Sarah swam in the European Masters Swimming Championships in London and became champion in the 35 - 39 age group at both the 400m and 800m Freestyle, and won Silver in the 200m in a British Record time.

== Personal life ==
She was educated at the University of Bath achieving BA (Hons) in Coach Education. She followed this up with a PG Cert in Coaching Science from the University of West England and has since graduated from Manchester Metropolitan University with a MSD in Sporting Directorship. Sarah was the Director of Sport at the Griffin Schools Trust, after which she enjoyed a spell at England Boxing as Head of Workforce, and is now the Head of Workforce at British Triathlon.
