= Swimming at the 1998 Commonwealth Games – Women's 800 metre freestyle =

Women's 800 metre freestyle at the 1998 Commonwealth Games
- Venue: KL Sports City
- Competitors: 13 from 9 nations
- Winning time: 8:42.23

Medalists
gold medal	Rachel Harris	Australia
silver medal	Joanne Malar	Canada
bronze medal	Sarah Collings	England

The women's 800 metre freestyle event at the 1998 Commonwealth Games took place at KL Sports City.

== Records ==
Prior to this competition, the existing world, Commonwealth and Games records were as follows:

World record	Janet Evans (USA)	8:16.22	Tokyo, Japan	20 August 1989
Commonwealth record	Julie McDonald (AUS)	8:22.93	Seoul, South Korea	24 September 1988
Games record	Tracey Wickham (AUS)	8:24.62	Edmonton, Canada	5 August 1978

== Results ==
=== Heats ===
Rank	Name	Nationality	Time	Notes
1	Sarah Collings	England	8:46.52	Q
2	Rachel Harris	Australia	8:43.96	Q
3	Tamee Ebert	Canada	8:52.07	Q
4	Emily Pedrazzini	Australia	8:52.24	Q
5	Joanne Malar	Canada	8:52.28	Q
6	Nadine Neumann	Australia	8:59.93	Q
7	Janelle Atkinson	Jamaica	9:01.78	Q
8	Andrea Schwartz	Canada	9:06.47	Q
9	Teo Mui Nyee	Malaysia	9:14.46	
10	Kristina Abbott	Cayman Islands	9:45.34	
11	Anita Kruger	Namibia	9:48.72	
12	Alicia Mullan	Bermuda	9:55.27	
13	Sophie Li	Mauritius	10:24.37	

=== Final ===
Rank	Lane	Name	Nationality	Time	Notes
1st place, gold medalist(s)	5	Rachel Harris	Australia	8:42.32	
2nd place, silver medalist(s)	2	Joanne Malar	Canada	8:43.96	
3rd place, bronze medalist(s)	4	Sarah Collings	England	8:45.56	
4	6	Emily Pedrazzini	Australia	8:45.87	
5	1	Janelle Atkinson	Jamaica	8:51.54	
6	3	Tamee Ebert	Canada	8:52.99	
7	8	Andrea Schwartz	Canada	8:54.24	
8	7	Nadine Neumann	Australia	8:55.36	
