= Perodua Alza =

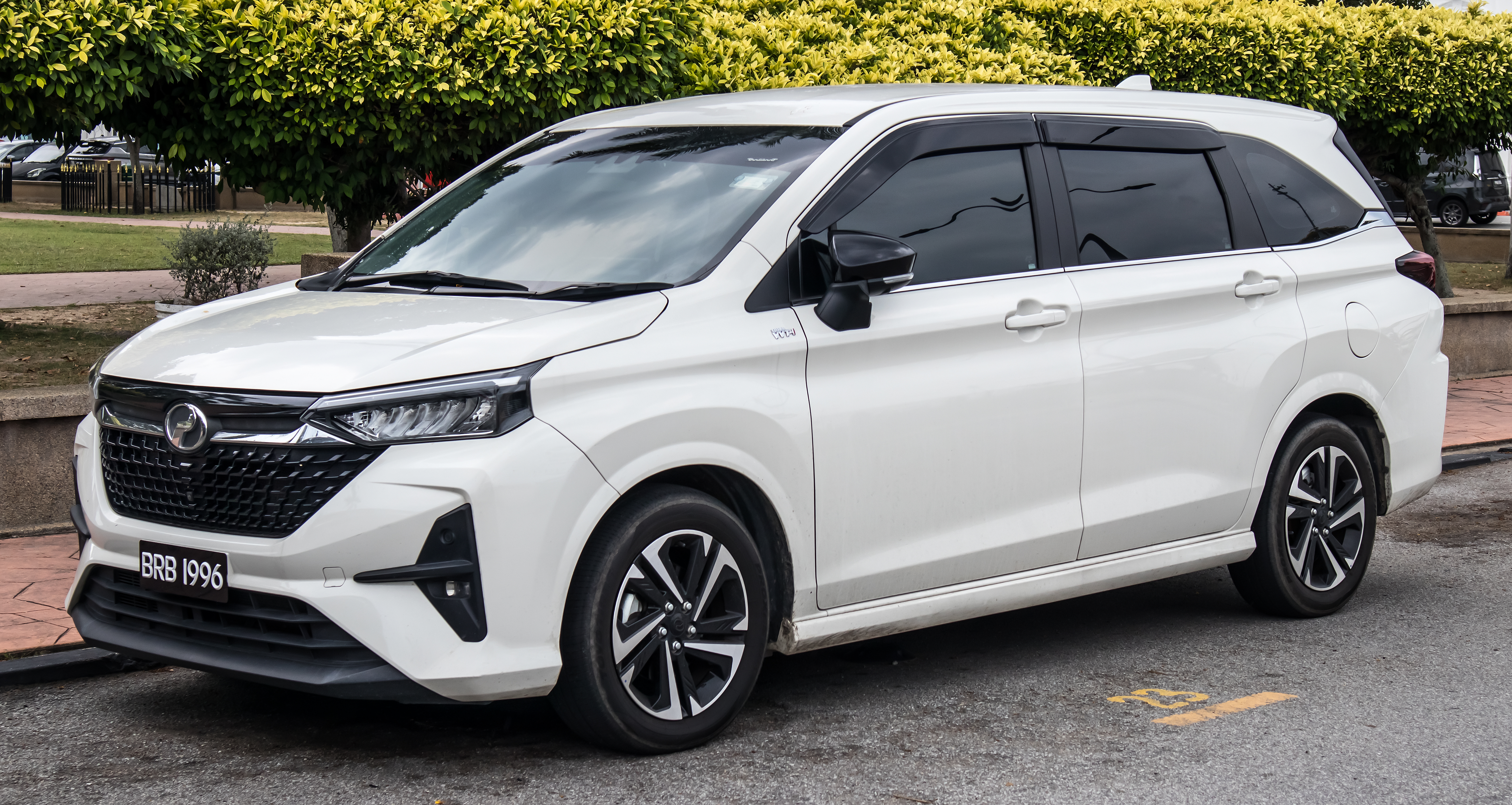
- 2025 Perodua Alza AV (Malaysia)

Overview
- Manufacturer: Perodua
- Also called: Daihatsu Boon Luminas / Toyota Passo Sette (2009–2022); Daihatsu Xenia / Toyota Avanza / Toyota Veloz (2022–present)
- Production: 2009–present

Body and chassis
- Class: Mini MPV (2009–2022); Compact MPV (2022–present)
- Body style: 5-door wagon
- Layout: Front-engine, front-wheel-drive
- Chassis: Unibody

Powertrain
- Engine: Petrol: 1.5 L 3SZ-VE I4 (2009–2022); 1.5 L 2NR-VE I4 (2022–present)
- Power output: 76.5 kW (104 PS; 103 hp) (3SZ-VE/2NR-VE)

The Perodua Alza is a B-segment multi-purpose vehicle (MPV) produced by Malaysian car manufacturer Perodua. The first-generation model, based on the Daihatsu Boon Luminas, was launched in November 2009 as the company's first purpose-built MPV. The second-generation model that was introduced in 2022 is based on the W100 series Daihatsu Xenia.

The name "Alza" is derived from the Spanish verb "alzar", which means "to rise". The name came from an internal competition held amongst Perodua's staff during the car's development phase.

== First generation (M500; 2009) ==
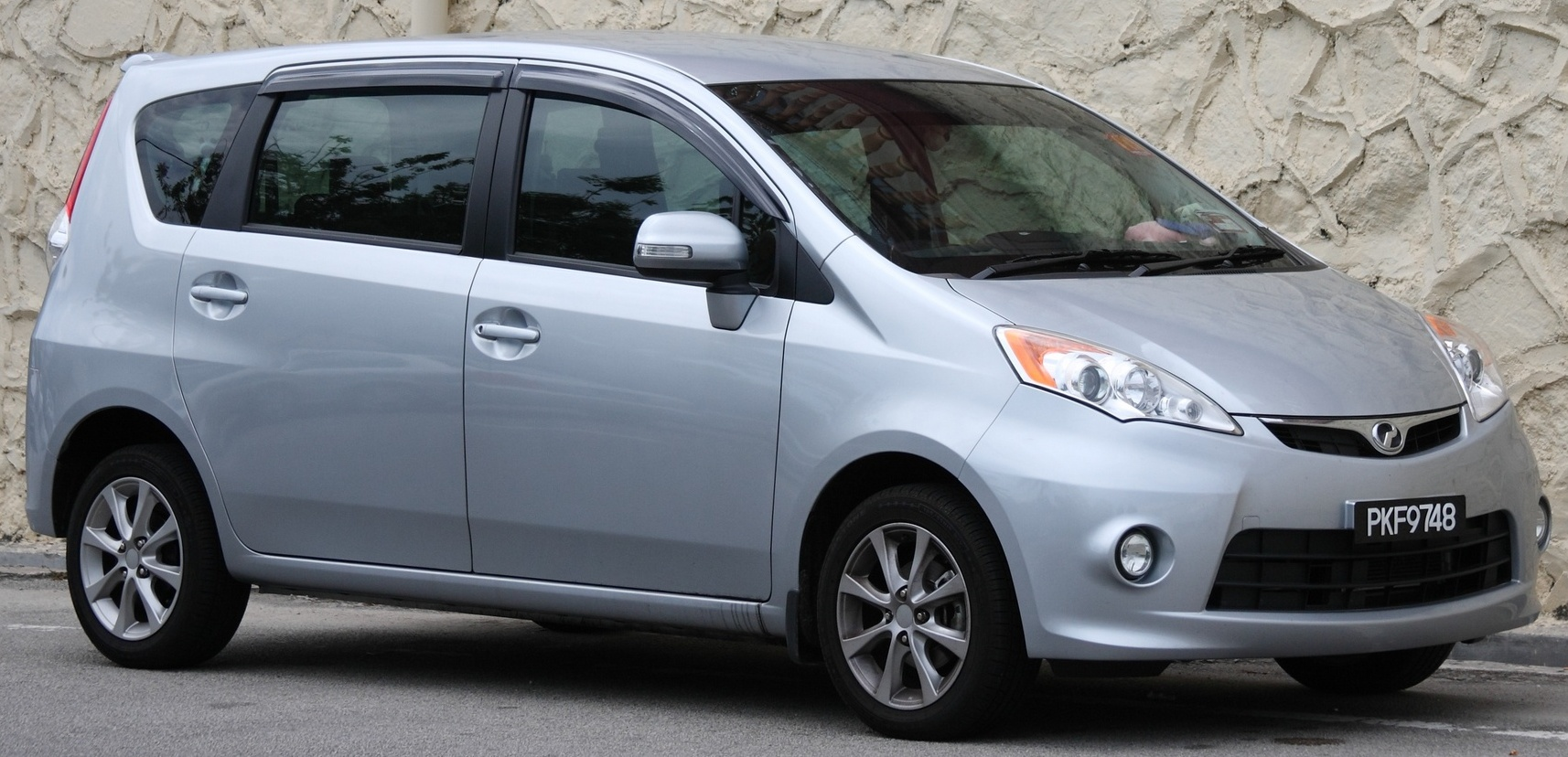
First-generation Perodua Alza (Premium)

The first-generation Alza, which is based on the Daihatsu Boon Luminas or Toyota Passo Sette was launched on 23 November 2009 and sold until 2022.

== Second generation (W150; 2022) ==
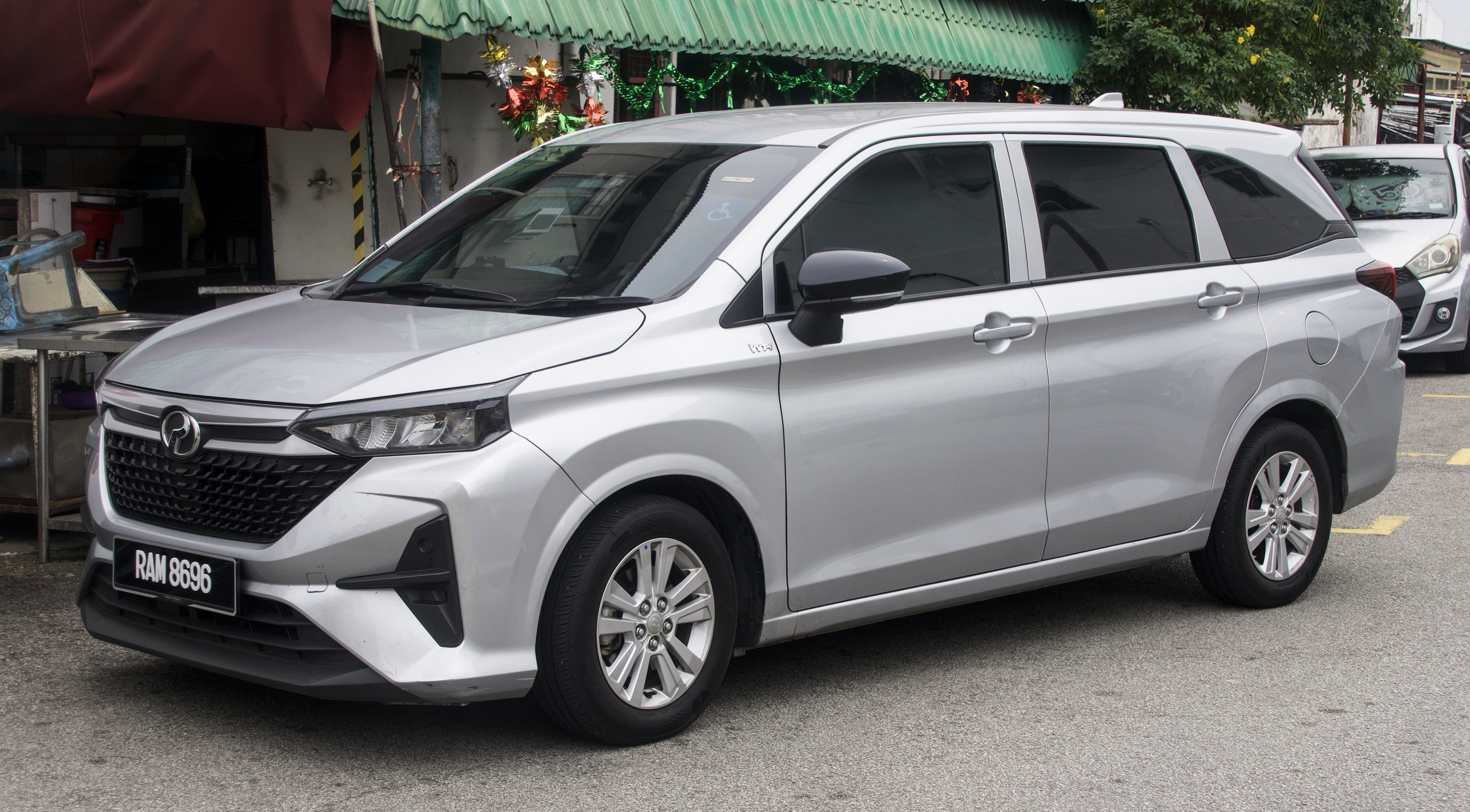
Second-generation Perodua Alza (X)

The second-generation Alza, which is based on the W100 series Daihatsu Xenia, was introduced on 20 July 2022. Received the "W150" model designation, It is offered in X, H and AV grade levels with the 1.5-litre 2NR-VE engine with D-CVT as the sole powertrain option. ASA 3.0 advanced driver-assistance systems package is standard on all grades. The model received a lower and more driver-oriented suspension settings, which made the Alza sit lower than the Avanza by 45 mm (1.8 in) with a ground clearance of 160 mm (6.3 in). It is assembled at the Perodua plant alongside the Malaysian market Toyota Veloz.
