= Danny Ramnarais =

Guyanese and Canadian cricketer (born 1964)

Kacamchand Ramnarais
Personal information
- Born: 20 June 1964 (age 62); Port Mourant, East Berbice-Corentyne, Guyana
- Batting: Right-handed
- Role: Wicket-keeper

International information
- National side: Canada

Domestic team information
- Years: Team
- 1983/84–1986/87: Berbice
- 1986/87: Guyana

Career statistics
Competition	First-class	List A
Matches	3	3
Runs scored	16	1
Batting average	8.00	0.33
100s/50s	0/0	0/0
Top score	10*	1
Catches/stumpings	4/1	1/2
- Source: CricketArchive, 14 October 2011

Kacamchand Ramnarais (born 20 June 1964) is a Guyanese and Canadian former cricketer. He played three first-class matches in the mid-1980s, and later played for the Canada national cricket team in two ICC Trophy tournaments and in the 1998 Commonwealth Games.
