= Perodua QV-E =

Battery electric subcompact crossover SUV

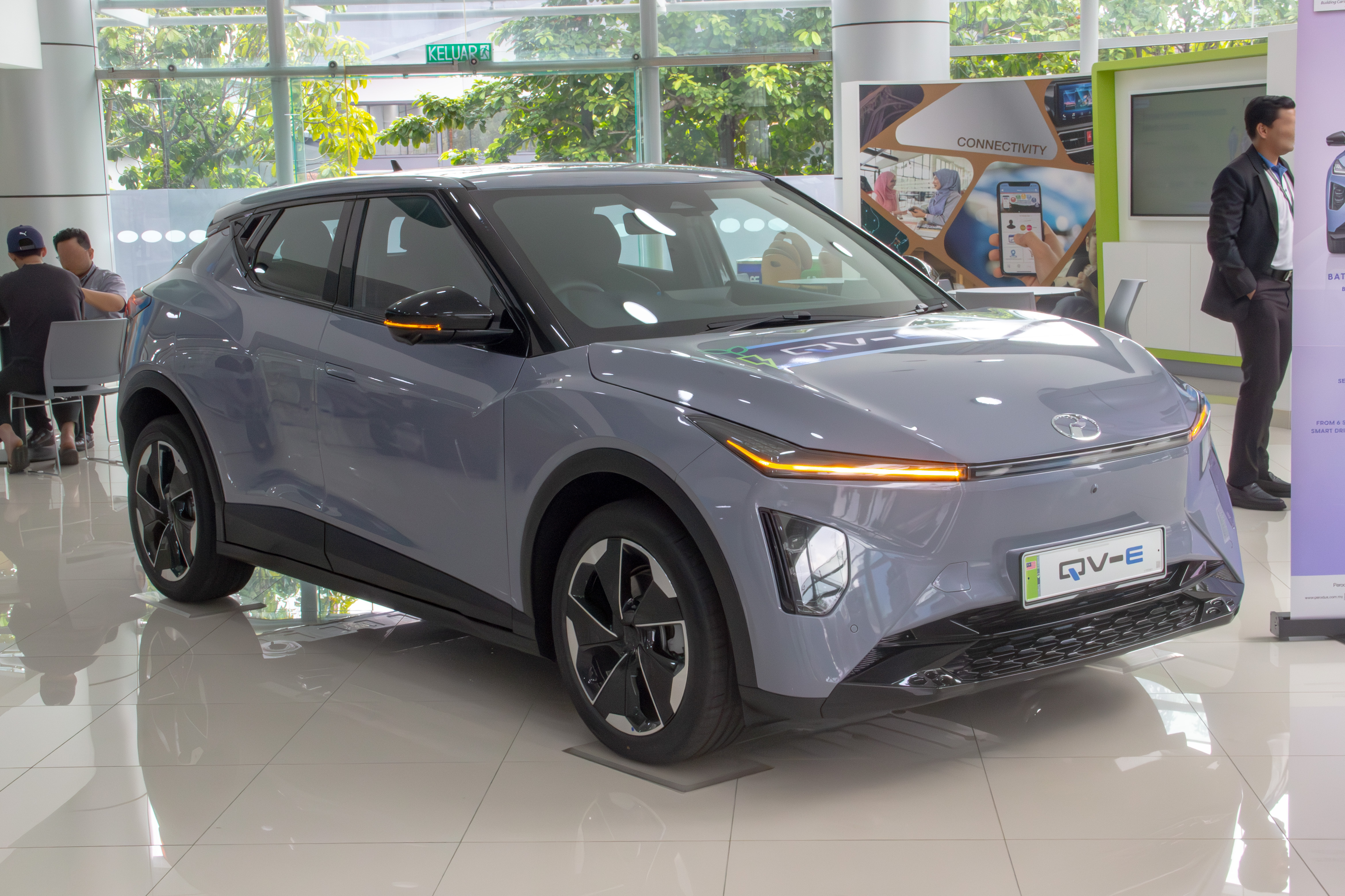

Overview
- Manufacturer: Perodua
- Model code: P101
- Production: December 2025 – present
- Assembly: Malaysia: Sungai Choh, Selangor
- Designer: Chok Jia Jiunn

Body and chassis
- Class: Subcompact crossover SUV (B)
- Body style: 5-door coupe SUV
- Layout: Front-motor, front-wheel-drive

Powertrain
- Electric motor: Permanent magnet synchronous
- Power output: 150 kW (204 PS; 201 hp)
- Battery: 52.5 kWh LFP CATL
- Electric range: 445 km (277 mi) (NEDC)
- Plug-in charging: 6.6 kW AC; 60 kW DC

Dimensions
- Wheelbase: 2,680 mm (105.5 in)
- Length: 4,170 mm (164.2 in)
- Width: 1,800 mm (70.9 in)
- Height: 1,502 mm (59.1 in)
- Kerb weight: 1,600 kg (3,527 lb)

The Perodua QV-E is a battery electric vehicle developed by Malaysian automaker Perodua. It is a car with a body style described as a 'sportback crossover'. The model was introduced in December 2025 jointly by Perodua and the Malaysian government.

The model follows the earlier eMO concept series showcased in 2024 and 2025. It is the first electric vehicle from Perodua, and the product developed by Perodua independently from its parent company Daihatsu. Developed in a span of two years, the QV-E is based on a modular platform co-developed with Magna Steyr, and uses LFP battery sourced from Chinese supplier CATL.

The name QV-E is an acronym for 'Quest for Visionary Electric Vehicle'.

== History ==
=== Development ===
The QV-E project, internally designated P01A, began in August 2023 after a directive from the Malaysian government to produce a locally developed EV. Perodua invested approximately RM800 million and 266,000 man-hours in research and development. With no suitable donor model from its parent company Daihatsu, Perodua collaborated with Austrian engineering and contract manufacturing firm Magna Steyr to co-develop a modular platform that will underpin future models, including sedans, hatchbacks, and SUVs.

The development of the QV-E was preceded by a series of concept vehicles under the Electric Motion Online (eMO) program. The first concept, eMO-II, debuted at the Kuala Lumpur International Mobility Show in late 2024 as a five-door hatchback. This was followed by the final eMO prototype showcased at the Malaysia Autoshow in May 2025, which is a B-segment SUV with a sporty silhouette and higher ground clearance. The prototype featured design elements such as flush door handles, full-width LED light bars, and 18-inch wheels, the largest ever fitted to a Perodua vehicle. The eMO prototype also previewed digital rear-view mirror, Apple CarPlay and Android Auto integration, and physical climate controls. During this stage, Perodua confirmed its adoption of a Battery-as-a-Service (BaaS) model and announced performance targets of 0–100 km/h in six to seven seconds, a top speed of 165 km/h (103 mph), and a range of approximately 400 km (250 mi).

Pre-production of the QV-E began in September 2025.

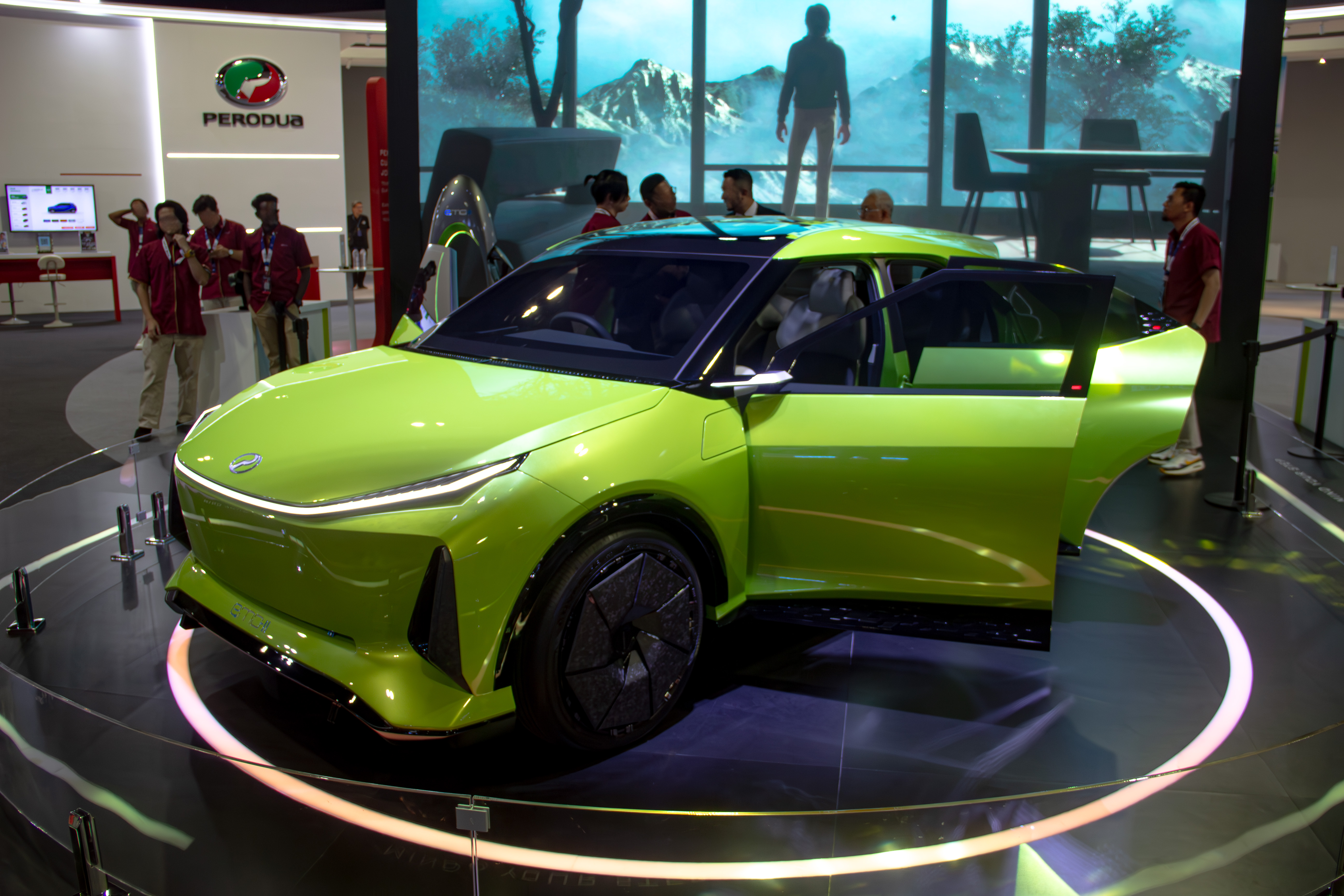
eMO-II Concept, previewing the QV-E

=== Introduction ===
The Perodua QV-E and officially launched on December 1, 2025, at the Ministry of International Trade and Industry headquarters in Kuala Lumpur. It is regarded as Malaysia's first fully homegrown battery electric vehicle and dubbed as a "significant milestone" in the nation's automotive industry.

The QV-E was developed to support Malaysia's New Industrial Master Plan 2030, which aims to accelerate the development of a local EV ecosystem. Perodua targets 50% local content by early 2026 and 70% by 2030, including key EV components such as traction motors. The QV-E is priced higher than some competitors, and higher than any other Perodua model, as it is positioned as a "lifestyle-oriented model".

The vehicle is priced excluding battery leasing cost. Perodua offers monthly payments for the car and battery lease combined. Mass production has commenced at Perodua's Smart Mobility Plant in Sungai Choh, with additional operations at Tan Chong's Serendah facility. Initial sales targets are set at 500 units per month, with plans to increase to 3,000 units per month by late 2026. The QV-E is available at selected Perodua EV outlets across Malaysia.

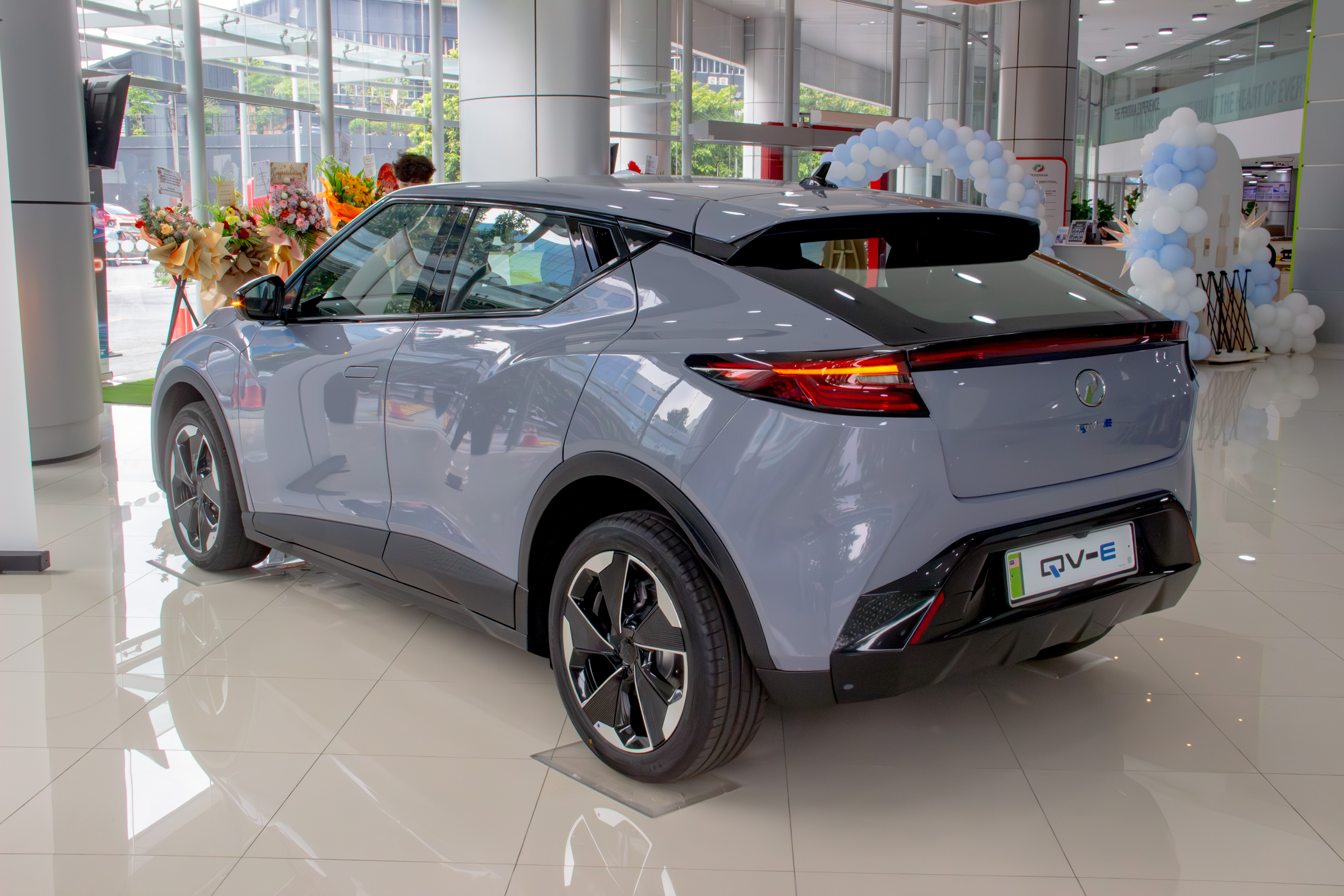
Rear View

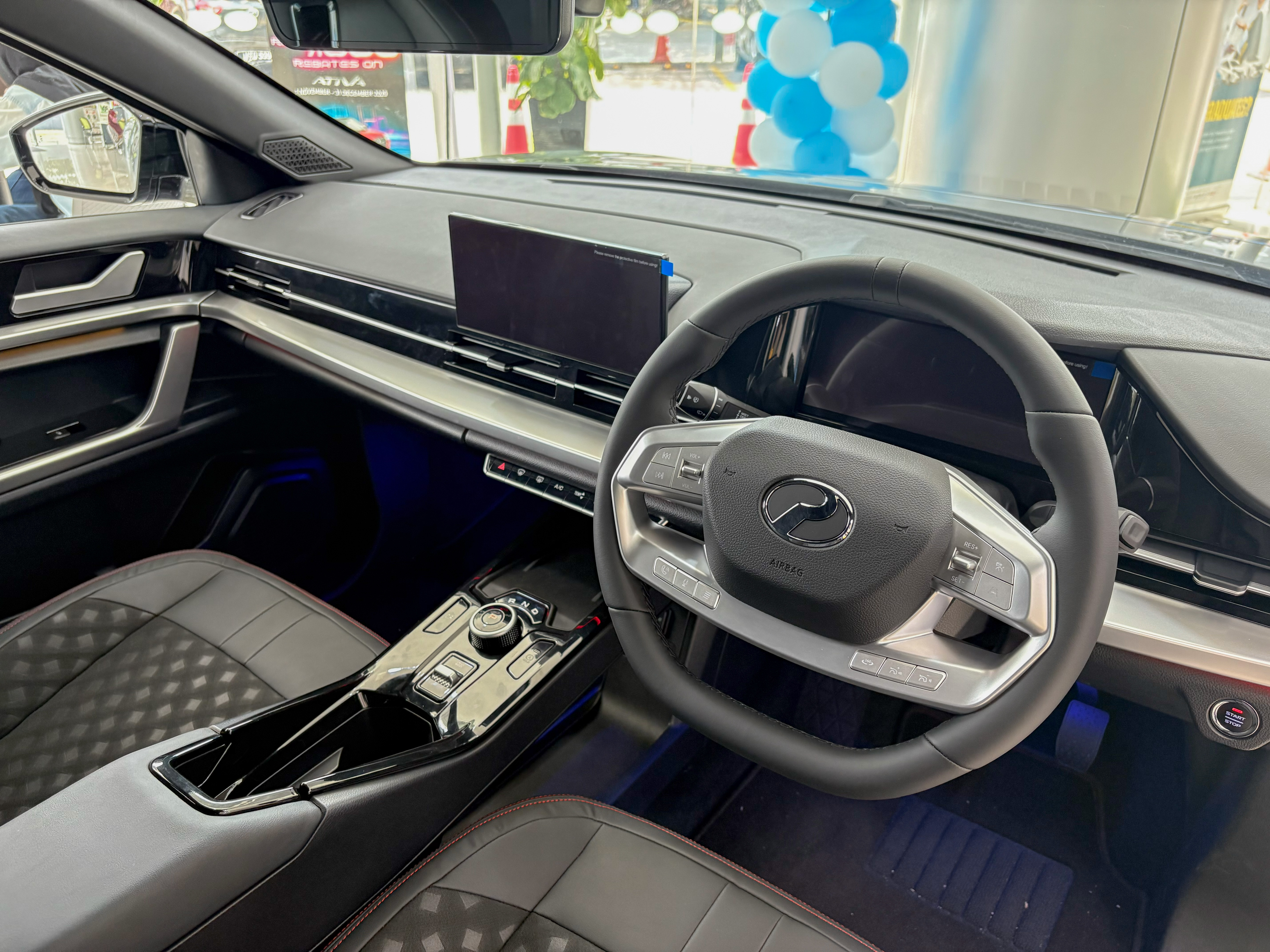
Interior

== Design and specifications ==
The QV-E adopts a 'fastback' crossover design and measures 4,170 mm (164.2 in) in length, 1,800 mm (70.9 in) in width, and 1,502 mm (59.1 in) in height, with a wheelbase of 2,680 mm (105.5 in) and ground clearance of 158 mm (6.2 in). It weighs around 1,600 kg (3,527 lb) and is powered by a front-mounted electric motor producing 150 kW (204 PS; 201 hp) and 285 N⋅m (210 lb⋅ft) of torque. This makes it the most powerful and fastest Perodua model to date, achieving 0–100 km/h (0–62 mph) in 7.5 seconds and a top speed of 165 km/h (103 mph). Energy is supplied by a 52.5 kWh lithium iron phosphate battery from CATL, offering a range of 445 km under the NEDC cycle, which translates to approximately 380 km under WLTP standards. Charging options include DC fast charging at 60 kW, which is able to charge 30–80% in 30 minutes, and AC home charging at 6.6 kW.

Perodua introduced a Battery-as-a-Service (BaaS) model for the QV-E, under which the battery is leased rather than sold. This approach addresses concerns about battery degradation, replacement costs, and disposal. The monthly lease fee is RM215 for a nine-year term, and ownership of the battery remains with Perodua. Resale transactions must be processed through Perodua's Pre-Owned Vehicles division to ensure continuity of the lease and proper battery management. The scheme also includes a lifetime guarantee on battery health, with replacements provided if the state of health falls below 70%. Since June 2026, Perodua re-launch the QV-E model with local compenents it can reduce the price. Now, Perodua QV-E selling price RM69,999 for BaaS option or RM93,999 for full purchase (including battery).

The QV-E incorporates several features that are new to Perodua, including a digital rear-view mirror, powered driver's seat, ambient lighting, a 10.25-inch infotainment display with wireless Apple CarPlay and Android Auto, wireless charging, and a full suite of advanced driver assistance systems. A notable safety innovation is Child Presence Detection, which uses millimetre-wave sensors to detect movement and breathing in the rear seats, triggering alerts if a child or pet is left inside. An SOS emergency call button linked to Perodua Auto Assist and national rescue services is also included.

== Safety ==
ASEAN NCAP test results Perodua QV-E (2025)
Test	Points
Overall:	5 /5 stars
Adult occupant:	36.63
Child occupant:	16.73
Safety assist:	20.00
Motorcyclist Safety:	15.00
