= Nigel Isaacs =

Canadian cricketer (born 1971)

Nigel Issacs
Personal information
- Born: 26 December 1971 (age 54); Colombo, Sri Lanka
- Batting: Left-handed
- Bowling: Right-arm off break

International information
- National side: Canada

Career statistics
Competition	List A
Matches	1
Runs scored	0
Batting average	0.00
100s/50s	0/0
Top score	0
Catches/stumpings	0/–
- Source: CricketArchive, 14 October 2011

Nigel Isaacs (born 26 December 1971) is a former Canadian cricketer. He was a left-handed batsman and a right-arm off-break bowler. He played one List A match for Canada at the 1998 Commonwealth Games. He also represented them at two ICC Trophy tournaments.

He is a native of Sri Lanka and was educated at St. Joseph's College, Colombo, Sri Lanka.
