= Aquatics at the 1998 Commonwealth Games =

- Venue: National Aquatic Centre, Bukit Jalil
- Location: Kuala Lumpur, Malaysia
- Dates: 11 to 21 September 1998

Aquatics at the 1998 Commonwealth Games was the 16th appearances of both Swimming at the Commonwealth Games and Diving at the Commonwealth Games and the fourth appearance of Synchronised swimming at the Commonwealth Games. Competition was held in Kuala Lumpur, Malaysia, from 11 to 21 September 1998.

The events were held at the National Aquatic Centre in Bukit Jalil, which is found in an area called the KL Sports City. The aquatic centre was specifically constructed for the Games and consisted of a 28,000 metre squared footprint and seating for 4,000 spectators.

Australia topped the aquatics medal table with 26 gold medals.

National Aquatic Centre in Bukit Jalil

== Medal table (all aquatic sports) ==
* Host nation (Malaysia)

Rank	Nation	Gold	Silver	Bronze	Total
1	Australia	26	21	12	59
2	Canada	8	8	13	29
3	England	5	8	13	26
4	Zimbabwe	1	0	0	1
5	South Africa	0	2	0	2
6	Scotland	0	1	0	1
7	New Zealand	0	0	2	2
Totals (7 entries)		40	40	40	120
