= Pensonic Group =

Malaysian electronics company

Pensonic Holdings Berhad
- Company type: Public limited company
- Traded as: MYX: 9997
- ISIN: MYL9997OO007
- Founded: 1965; 61 years ago
- Founder: Chew Weng Khak
- Headquarters: Suite 16-1 (Penthouse Upper), Menara Penang Garden, 42A Jalan Sultan Ahmad Shah, 10050 Penang
- Area served: Malaysia; Philippines
- Brands: Pensonic
- Website: pensonic.com

Pensonic Holdings Berhad (stylized as PENSONIC) (MYX: 9997) is a Malaysian company that sells electrical appliances. It was founded by Chew Weng Khak in 1965 as a shop in Penang selling electrical appliances trading under the name of Keat Radio Co. with Chew as a sole proprietor. In 1982, Chew started the Pensonic brand name to produce locally manufactured electrical appliances.

== Dispute over name ==
In some markets, Panasonic has accused Pensonic of being a knockoff of former's through the similar brand name and affecting their market share, leading to lawsuits. Pensonic says that its the name was created by combining Penang and Sonic to mean the "sound of Penang".

In 2008, Panasonic won an injunction against Pensonic in Singapore. In Sri Lanka, Pensonic successfully won a judgement to register its trademark in January 2009 against opposition by Panasonic. The judgment observed that Pensonic was previously registered in Malaysia, Japan, and many other countries without the objection of Panasonic.
