= Ten-pin bowling at the 1998 Commonwealth Games =

Boxing competitions

- Venue: Sunway Pyramid Bowl, Subang Jaya
- Location: Kuala Lumpur, Malaysia
- Dates: 11 to 21 September 1998

Ten-pin bowling at the 1998 Commonwealth Games was the inaugural appearance of Ten-pin bowling at the Commonwealth Games. The sport was introduced for the Games because it was very popular in Malaysia and parts of Asia. The events were held in Kuala Lumpur, Malaysia, from 11 to 21 September 1998 and featured contests in five events.

The ten-pin bowling events were held the Sunway Pyramid Bowl in Subang Jaya, a bowling facility located within a large shopping mall.

Australia topped the ten-pin bowling medal table by virtue of winning three gold medals.

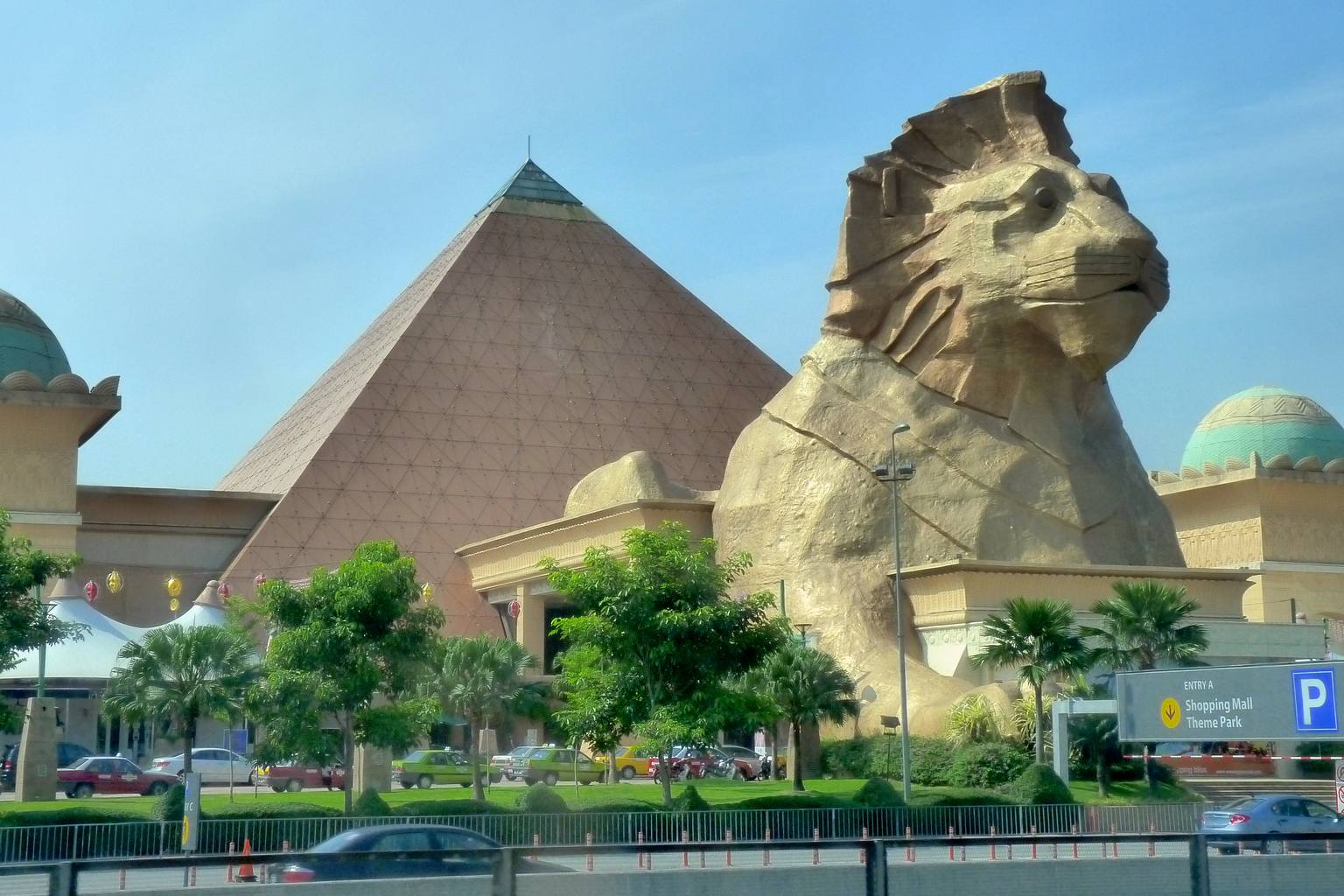
The Pyramid in 2011

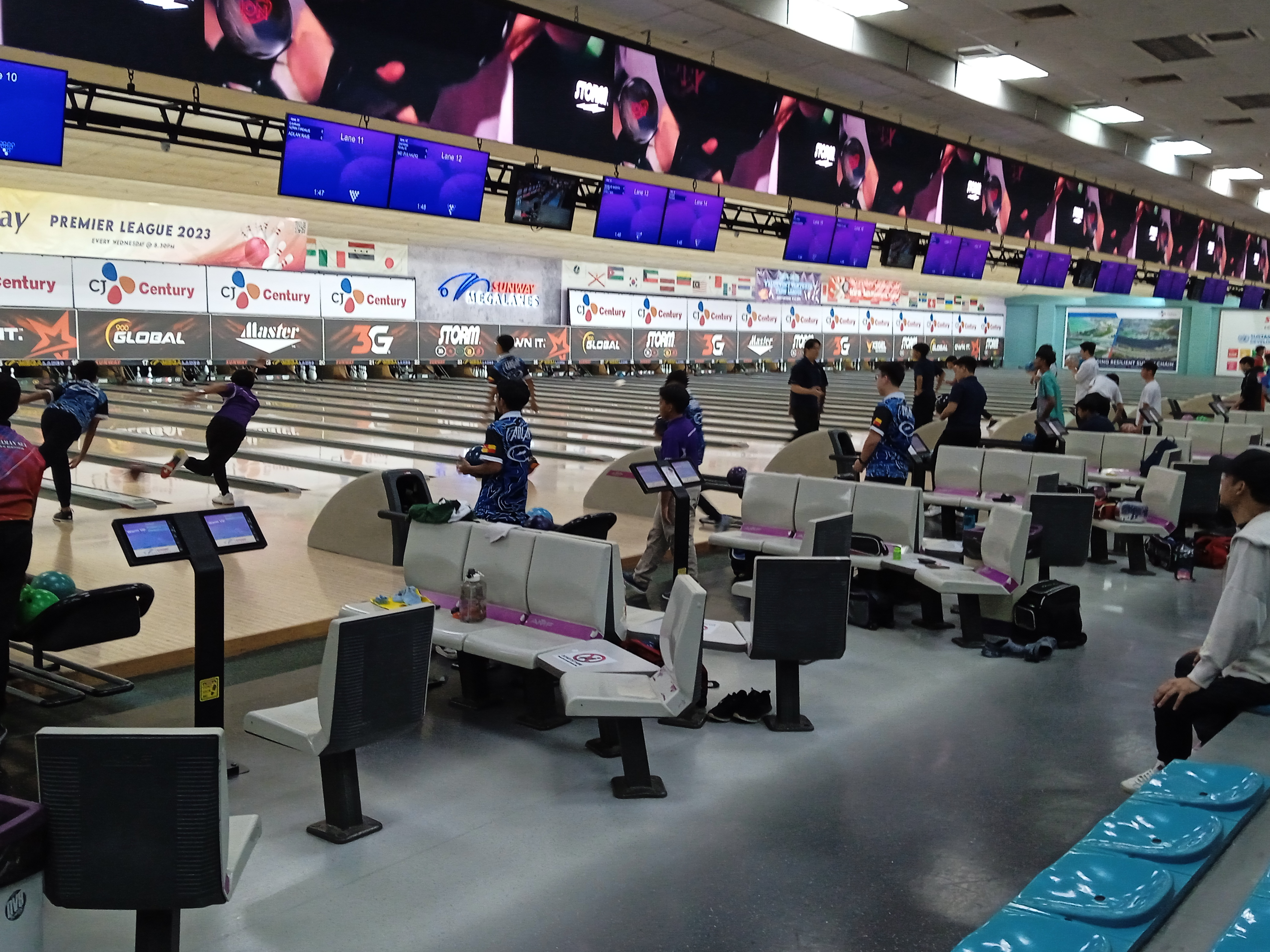
The pyramid bowl in 2024

== Medal table ==
* Host nation (Malaysia)

Rank	Nation	Gold	Silver	Bronze	Total
1	Australia	3	1	1	5
2	Malaysia*	2	1	1	4
3	Canada	0	1	2	3
4	England	0	1	1	2
5	Bermuda	0	1	0	1
Totals (5 entries)		5	5	5	15

== Medallists ==
Event	Gold	Silver	Bronze
Men's singles	Kenny Ang; Malaysia, 6046 points	Bill Rowe; Canada, 5946	Warren Rennox; Canada, 5850
Women's singles	Cara Honeychurch; Australia, 6406	Maxine Nable; Australia, 6028	Lai Kin Ngoh; Malaysia, 5920
Men's doubles	Kenny Ang and Ben Heng; Malaysia, 3522	Antoine Jones and Conrad Lister; Bermuda, 3329	Michael Muir and Frank Ryan; Australia, 3229
Women's doubles	Cara Honeychurch and Maxine Nable; Australia, 3678	Lai Kin Ngoh and Shalin Zulkifli; Malaysia, 3548	Pauline Buck and Gemma Burden; England, 3536
Mixed doubles	Frank Ryan and Cara Honeychurch; Australia, 3605	Richard Hood and Pauline Buck; England, 3560	Bill Rowe and Jane Amlinger; Canada, 3536
