= Perodua =

Malaysian automotive manufacturer

Perusahaan Otomobil Kedua Sdn. Bhd.

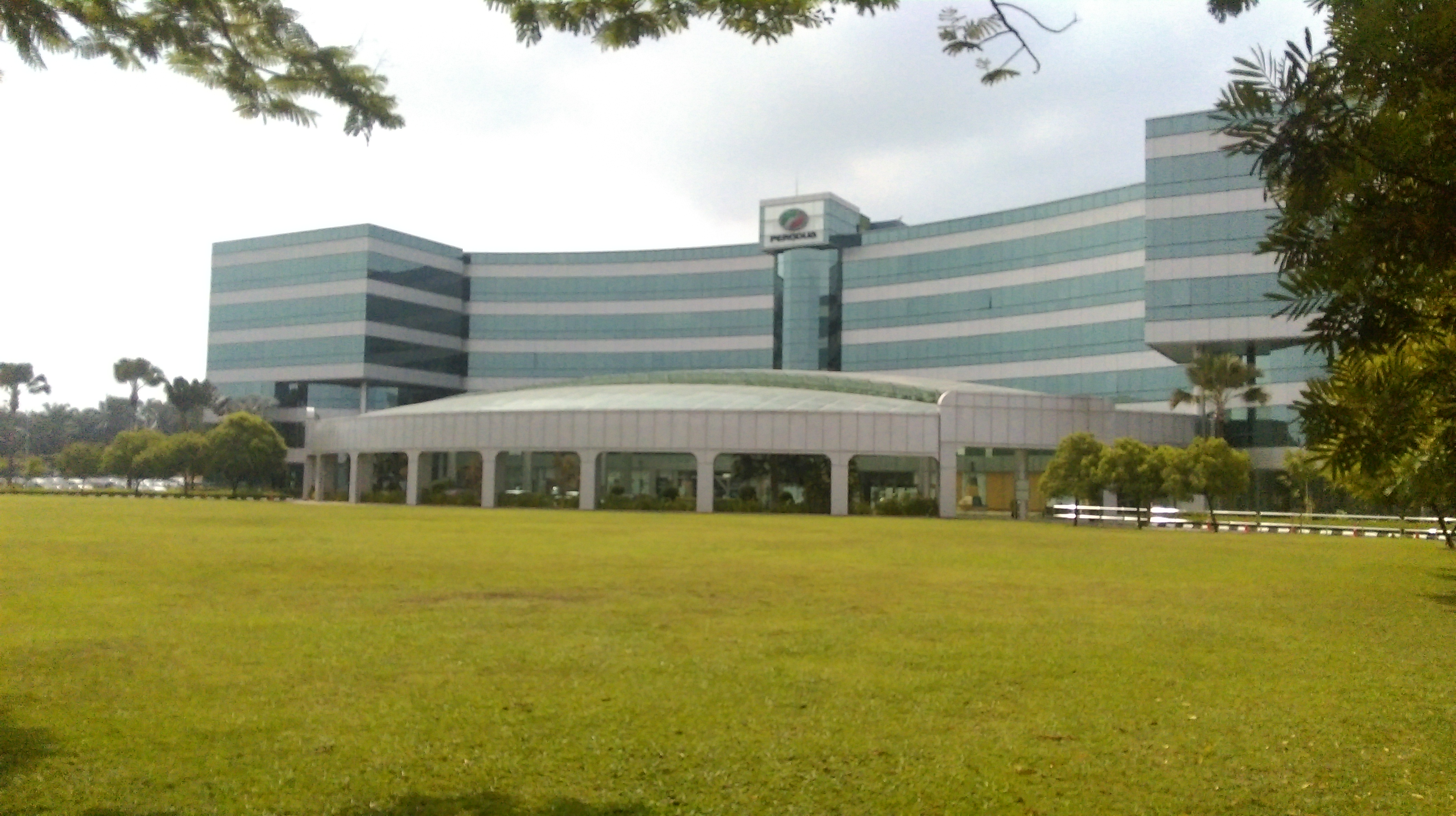
- Perodua corporate office in Rawang, Selangor
- Type: Private
- Industry: Automotive
- Founded: 1993; 33 years ago
- Headquarters: Sungai Choh, Rawang, Malaysia
- Area served: Malaysia; Brunei Darussalam; Mauritius; Seychelles; Singapore; Sri Lanka
- Key people: Tan Sri Asmat Kamaludin (chairman); Dato Zainal Abidin Ahmad (president & CEO)
- Products: Automobiles
- Owners: UMW Corporation (38%); Daihatsu Motor Co. (Toyota) (20%); Daihatsu (Malaysia) (5%); MBM Resources (20%); PNB Equity Resource Corporation (10%); Mitsui & Co. (4.2%); Mitsui & Co. (Asia Pacific) (2.8%)
- Number of employees: 11,500 (2023)
- Website: perodua.com.my

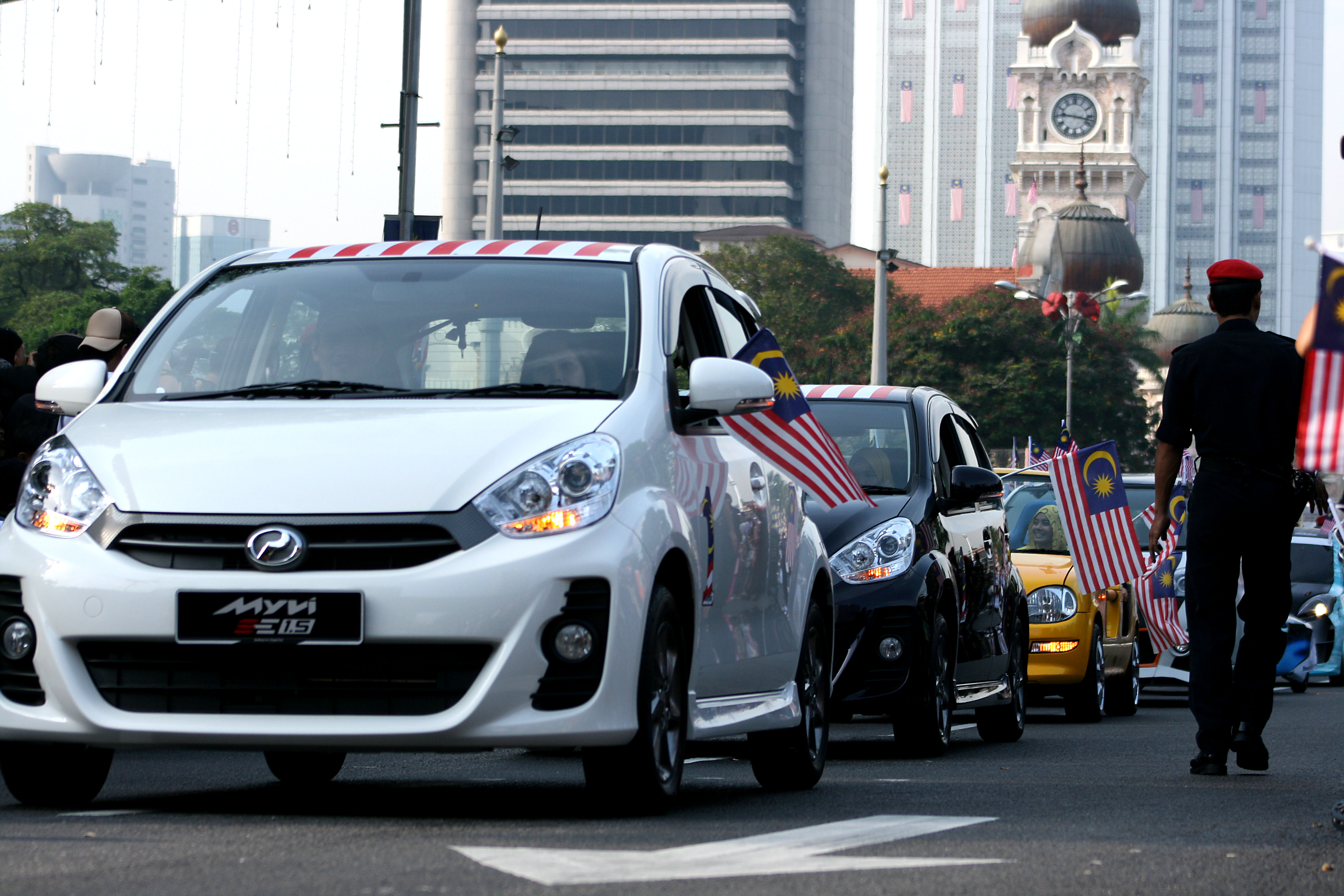
The Perodua Myvi was the best-selling car in Malaysia for eight consecutive years, between 2006 and 2014.

Perusahaan Otomobil Kedua Sendirian Berhad (lit. 'Second Automobile Company Private Limited'), usually abbreviated to Perodua (Malay: [pəroˈdua]), is Malaysia's largest car manufacturer, followed by Proton Holdings.

== Background and history ==
Perodua was established in 1993 and launched its first 5-door hatchback, the Perodua Kancil, in August 1994. Initially, the company mainly produced minicars and superminis and did not have models in the same market segments as Proton. Its targeted market segments later began to overlap with Proton's—especially in the super-compact segment, where the Perodua Myvi has competed with the likes of the Proton Savvy and the Proton Iriz.

Perodua does not design or engineer its main components, such as engines and transmissions, in-house; its cars have historically used Daihatsu component designs. Daihatsu held a 20% stake in Perodua at the company's launch, increasing it to 25% in 2001 and then to 35%. In 2004, Perodua began assembling the Toyota Avanza at its plant in Rawang, for sale in Malaysia.

The company's shareholders include UMW Holdings (38%), Daihatsu Motor Co. (20%), Daihatsu (Malaysia) (5%), MBM Resources (20%), PNB Equity Resource Corporation (10%), Mitsui & Co. (4.2%), and Mitsui & Co. (Asia Pacific) (2.8%).

== Sales ==
Domestic

Perodua sold more than 207,100 vehicles in 2016, which was its highest yearly sales record to date, and achieved a highest-ever domestic market share of 35.7%. This has climbed since, and in 2024, the company sold 358,000 cars in the ASEAN markets combined, surpassing Honda's sales figures to become the second largest car manufacturer in the region.

International

In the United Kingdom, Perodua's cars were sold by some Proton dealers, who wished to attract customers seeking a smaller and cheaper alternative to the Proton range. Sales numbers in the UK were small, however, and in 2008, Perodua sold only 624 cars (down from 914 in 2002). Sales were up slightly in 2009 (to 650) and then to 761 in 2010, mainly due to the new Perodua Myvi selling comparatively well. The company has withdrawn from the British, Nepalese, and Maltese markets but still provides spare parts to existing customers there.

As of 2025, Perodua cars are exported to Singapore, Brunei, Mauritius, Fiji, Sri Lanka, and Seychelles. Since 2007, the company also exports the Myvi to Indonesia as the Daihatsu Sirion; this made up 55 percent of Perodua's exports in 2020.

In 2021, the company began exploring the idea of exporting used Perodua cars overseas. As of 2024, the company was exporting used cars to a few countries, including Fiji. At the same time, exports of used cars to Sri Lanka were halted.

== Models ==
=== Current ===
Model	Introduction	Current model		Vehicle description
Model	Introduction	Introduction (model code)	Update/facelift	Vehicle description
Myvi	2005	2017 (M800)	2021	B-segment hatchback. Exported to Indonesia as the Daihatsu Sirion
Alza	2009	2022 (W150)	–	B-segment MPV, based on the Daihatsu Xenia
Axia	2014	2023 (A300)	–	A-segment hatchback, based on the Daihatsu Ayla and the successor to the Perodua Viva
Bezza	2016	2016 (B300)	2020	A-segment sedan, based on the Perodua Axia
Aruz	2019	2019 (F850)	–	B-segment three-row, crossover SUV, based on the Daihatsu Terios
Ativa	2021	2021 (A270)	–	A-segment crossover SUV, based on the Daihatsu Rocky
QV-E	2025	2025 (P01A)	–	B-segment battery-electric crossover SUV
Traz	2025	2025 (AC200)	–	B-segment crossover SUV, based on the Toyota Yaris Cross

=== Past ===
Model	Introduction	Discontinued	Vehicle description				
Model	Introduction	Discontinued	Vehicle description	Kancil	1994	2009	A-segment hatchback based on the Daihatsu Mira L200
Rusa	1996	2007	Microvan based on the Daihatsu Zebra				
Kembara	1998	2007	A-segment SUV based on the Daihatsu Terios J100				
Kenari	2000	2009	A-segment hatchback based on the Daihatsu Move L900				
Kelisa	2001	2007	A-segment hatchback based on the Daihatsu Mira L700				
Viva	2007	2014	A-segment hatchback based on the Daihatsu Mira L250				
Nautica	2008	2009	A-segment SUV based on the Toyota Rush				

== Slogans ==
Corporate

- "Kehebatan Yang Pasti" ("assured excellence") (1997–2008)
- "Happy Motoring" (2000–2008)
- "Building Cars, People First" (2008–present)
- "Kepuasan Pelanggan Sepenuhnya" ("complete customer satisfaction") (2021–present)

Anniversary

- 10 Years of Excellence (Perodua's 10th-anniversary slogan, 2003)
- 20 Years of Driving Value and Beyond (Perodua's 20th-anniversary slogan, 2013)
- 30 Years of Building Cars (Perodua's 30th-anniversary slogan, 2023)

== Brand identity ==
First logo (1993–1998)

Second logo (1998–2008)

Current logo

=== Logo history ===
Perodua organised a competition in 1997 to find a new corporate logo, to be launched together with their upcoming model, tentatively known as the X555. The competition was won by Johnson Ng Weng Kuan, an architecture student from Universiti Teknologi Malaysia. Perodua officially unveiled the new corporate logo on 24 August 1998, when they launched Malaysia's first sport utility vehicle, the Perodua Kembara.

The new logo maintained the 'P' and '2' and the colours of the old, squarish logo, but has been stylised further to become elliptical.

In June 2008, Perodua launched a new corporate identity. This included an update to the logo, which maintained the 'P' and '2' and the main colour blocks from previous logos but brightened the colours, adding a metallic look and a three-dimensional effect.

== Awards and accolades ==
- People's Choice, Automotive Category (Bronze) – Putra Brands Awards 2010
- People's Choice, Automotive Category (Silver) – Putra Brands Awards 2012, 2015 & 2016
- Most Favorite Brand Automotive Sedan/Compact Cars – The BrandLaureate Bestbrands Award 2016—2017
- People's Choice, Automotive Category (Gold) – Putra Brands Awards 2017 & 2018
- Malaysia Car of the Year 2025 awards
