= 1998 Commonwealth Games =

Multi-sport event held in Malaysia

XVI Commonwealth Games
- Host city: Kuala Lumpur, Malaysia
- Motto: Bersama-sama Gemilangkannya (Together we'll glorify this moment)
- Nations: 70
- Athletes: 3,638
- Events: 214 in 15 sports
- Opening: 11 September 1998
- Closing: 21 September 1998
- Opened by: Tuanku Jaafar; King of Malaysia
- Closed by: Elizabeth II
- Athlete's Oath: Shalin Zulkifli
- Queen's Baton Final Runner: Koh Eng Tong
- Main venue: Bukit Jalil National Stadium

The 1998 Commonwealth Games (Malay: Sukan Komanwel 1998), officially known as the XVI Commonwealth Games (Malay: Sukan Komanwel ke-16), were a multi-sport event held in Kuala Lumpur, Malaysia. The 1998 Games were the first to be held in Asia, and the last Commonwealth Games of the 20th century. For the first time ever, the Games included team sports. Around 3,638 athletes from 70 Commonwealth member nations participated at the Games, which featured 214 events in 15 sports with 34 of them collected medals.

== Host selection ==
Kuala Lumpur was selected to stage the games at the General Assembly of the Commonwealth Games Federation in Barcelona, Spain during the 1992 Summer Olympics.

1998 Commonwealth Games Bidding Results
City	CGA Name	Votes
Kuala Lumpur	Malaysia	40
Adelaide	Australia	25

== Preparation ==
=== Venues ===
1998 Commonwealth Games host stages

Kuala Lumpur
National Sports Complex, Malaysia

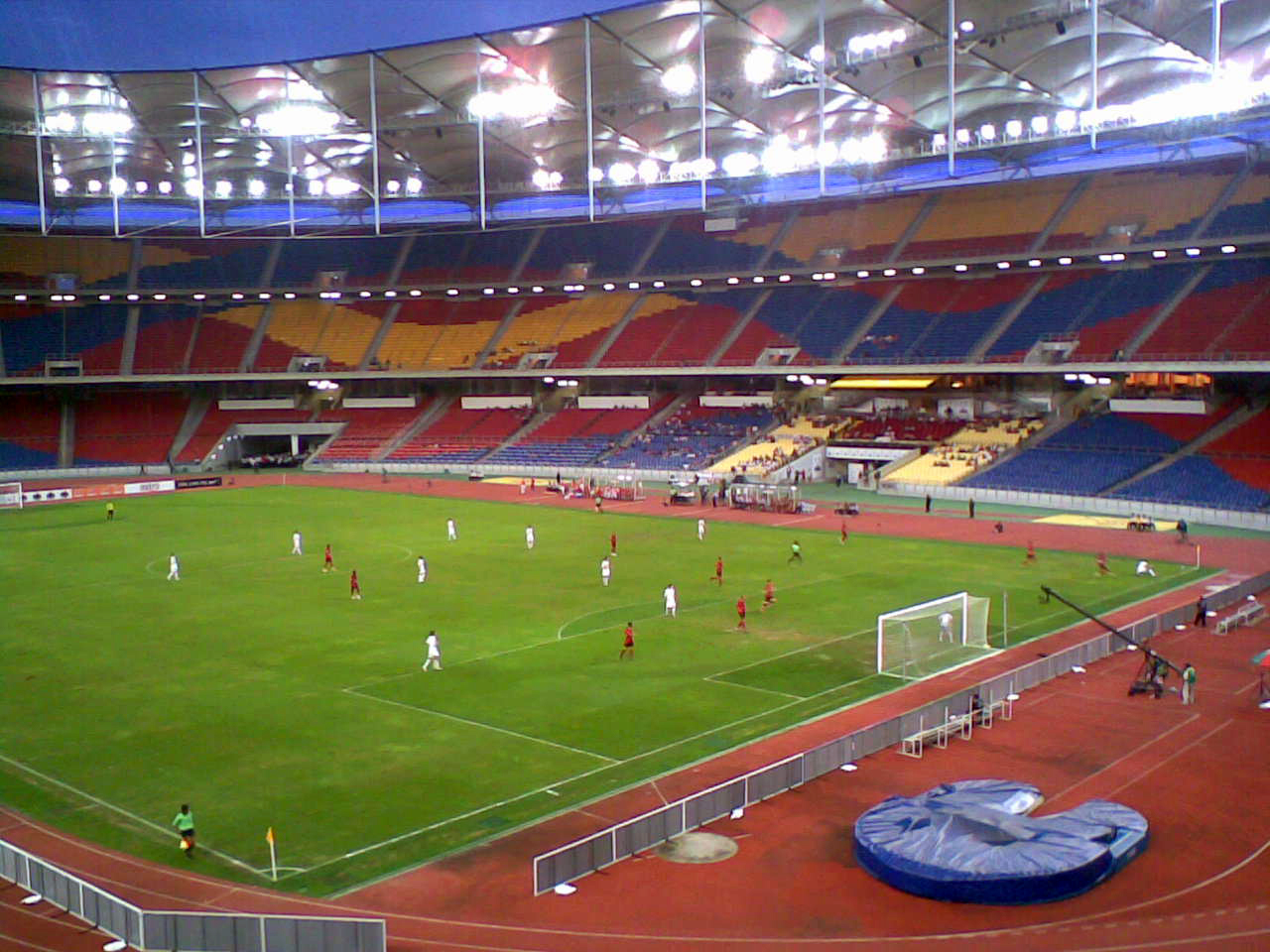
National Stadium Bukit Jalil

- Bukit Jalil National Stadium – Opening/Closing Ceremony, Athletics (track and field)
- Putra Indoor Stadium – Gymnastics
- National Aquatic Centre – Aquatics (swimming, diving, synchronised swimming)
- National Hockey Stadium – Hockey (men's)
- National Squash Centre – Squash

Bukit Kiara Sports Complex

- Juara Stadium – Netball
- National Lawn Bowls Centre – Lawn Bowls

Other venues

- Merdeka Square, Kuala Lumpur – Athletics (marathon)
- Titiwangsa Lake Gardens – Athletics (race walk)
- Kuala Lumpur Badminton Stadium (Cheras) – Badminton
- Cheras Velodrome – Cycling (track)
- Royal Military College, Sungai Besi – Cricket (group stage)
- Victoria Institution – Cricket (group stage)
- Tenaga National Sports Complex – Cricket (group stage)
- Kelab Aman, Ampang – Cricket (group stage, bronze medal match)
- Kuala Lumpur Hockey Stadium, Pantai – Hockey (women's)

Selangor

- Mines Convention Centre – Weightlifting
- Shah Alam Circuit – Cycling (road)
- Malawati Stadium, Shah Alam – Boxing
- Sunway Pyramid Bowl, Subang Jaya – Ten-pin bowling
- Petaling Jaya Stadium, Petaling Jaya – Rugby sevens
- Selangor state Development Corporation (PKNS) Kelana Jaya – Cricket (gold medal match)
- Rubber Research Institute, Sungai Buloh – Cricket (group stage)

Kedah

- Langkawi International Shooting Range (Lisram) – Shooting

The athletes' village (Vista Kommanwel) with a capacity of 6,000 people is located beside the National Sports Complex in Bukit Jalil. It consists of three tower blocks of 30 storeys and six hillside blocks of 19 storeys with 1,300 condominiums and an International Shopping Zone. The International Broadcast Centre was constructed at Angkasapuri, Kuala Lumpur, while Mint Hotel (now Nouvelle Hotel) served as the Main Press Centre. stage broadcaster Radio Televisyen Malaysia was the host broadcaster of the event.

=== Opening ceremony ===
The 16th Commonwealth Games opening ceremony took place on 11 September 1998 at 20:00 MST (UTC+08:00). During the ceremony, approximately 4,840 Soka Gakkai Malaysia volunteers displayed coloured flip cards which depicted sporting images, flags of the Commonwealth nations and messages that heralded the first games in Asia in the 68 years since their inception. The ceremony was preceded by a pre-show concert by Malaysian pop singers such as Noraniza Idris, Jamal Abdillah, Amy Search, Saleem, Zamani, Ella, Anuar Zain, Ziana Zain, Sheila Majid, Amy Mastura, Ning Baizura and Siti Nurhaliza, performance by local comedian Harith Iskander and 16 paratroopers who descended down the stadium.

The ceremony began with the arrival of dignitaries including the Chairman of Commonwealth Games Federation Michael Fennel, Prince Edward, Sultan of Brunei Hassanal Bolkiah, Prime Minister Mahathir Mohamad, the Yang Dipertuan Agong and Malaysian minister of Youth and Sports Muhyiddin Yassin. This was followed by the parade of nations — 69 participating nations, led by mascot Wira and previous games' mascots (Canada being the first country to come into the stadium as host country of the previous games, and Malaysia entering last as hosts).The Singaporean delegation was jeered by the crowd during the parade of nations. Then came a performance about a Malaysian rainforest by 2,000 school children who dressed as birds, bees and flowers.

After the performance, the Queen's message was delivered in the ceremonial baton, which had begun the final stages of its journey on the back of an elephant. 1978 Commonwealth Games badminton gold medal winner Sylvia Ng took the last lap with the baton and handed it off to Koh Eng Tong, a weightlifter who won a gold medal in weightlifting for Malaya in the 1950 British Empire Games, to take the final few feet to Prince Edward.

Contrary to tradition, the games were officially opened by the Malaysian head of stage, Yang di Pertuan Agong Tuanku Jaafar by striking the gong three times. A burst of fireworks and blurring of the giant bunga raya and a 16-gun salute which represents 1998 Commonwealth Games being the 16th-edition games, signified the beginning of the games. The Commonwealth Games flag was then brought into the stadium raised to the theme song of the Games Forever As One written by local composer, Goh Boon Hoe. Malaysian bowler Shalin Zulkifli later take the oath on behalf of the athletes.

The ceremony concluded with a 40-minute performance, titled "Aur di Tebing" (Bamboo at the riverside) with the theme 'Unity towards Progress', which was conveyed through dance, music, and intricate human graphics. 2,000 performers swirled and danced carrying trays of bunga emas (golden flowers) on their heads during a mass silat display. The show told the Malaysian history from ancient Malacca to the present development in Malaysia, its political, economical and technological achievements as well as its people's vision of peace, prosperity and unity and lifestyle.

=== Closing ceremony ===
The closing ceremony took place on 21 September 1998 at 20:00 MST (UTC+08:00). The attendees of the ceremony included Raja Permaisuri Agong, Tuanku Najihah, Prince Philip, Duke of Edinburgh, Prime Minister Mahathir Mohamad and his wife, Commonwealth Games Federation President (CGF), Sir Michael Fennel; Commonwealth of Nations Secretary-general Chief Emeka Anyaoku; Minister of youth and sports Tan Sri Muhyiddin Yassin and Executive Chairman of Sukom Ninety Eight Berhad, Tan Sri Hashim Mohd. Ali.

The ceremony began with Queen Elizabeth and King Ja'afar's arrival in a limousine, for inspection of guards of honour of the Royal Malay Regiment. The British national anthem God Save The Queen was played followed by Malaysia's national anthem Negaraku. This was followed by a 3-part cultural performance led by a band performance by 400 school students from Johor, Negeri Sembilan, Selangor and Kuala Lumpur followed by an upbeat song performance from local artist Jay Jay.

As the protocol says, a 15-minute presentation from Manchester, England, host city of the 2002 edition, was staged which included songs, videos and a live performance from the group New Order at the Albert Square, also the main moment was when message from British Prime Minister Tony Blair was delivered.

A contemporary farewell dance performance by local artists, featured Siti Nurhaliza and Noraniza Idris concludes the cultural performance. Soon afterwards, all the participants, flag-bearers and the volunteers march into the main ground of the stadium and Olympic council of Malaysia president Tan Sri Hamzah Abu Samah later declared the returning of the flags of all the participating nations.

Then the protocol was resumed and the 69 Commonwealth Games Associations flagbearers positioned themselves in a rostrum and the Commonwealth Games flag was lowered by the Malaysian armed forces. Next, the flag of the Commonwealth Games Federation is lowered by Malaysian Armed Forces personnel to the games theme song, Forever as one and is paraded around the stadium before being folded and handed over to the mayor of Kuala Lumpur, Tan Sri Kamarulzaman Sharif, who handed it over to the president of the Commonwealth Games Federation, Jamaican Michael Fennel. Fennel handed the flag to the Chief Citizen of Manchester city, Gordon Conquest. Following, the official speeches were delivered and Queen Elisabeth was invited to declare the Games closed. In a new protocol step, the Queen has withdrawn from the stadium alongside the King of Malaysia and other authorities, after the guard of honour march song has played, followed by Auld Lang Syne. The Prime Minister of Malaysia, Mahathir Mohamad, later made an announcement to declare 28 September 1998 as a national public holiday to commemorate the nation's success in hosting the games. The ceremony concluded with a concert performed by Six Commonwealth Top Singers representing the six regions of the Commonwealth Federation and local artists.

== Participating associations ==
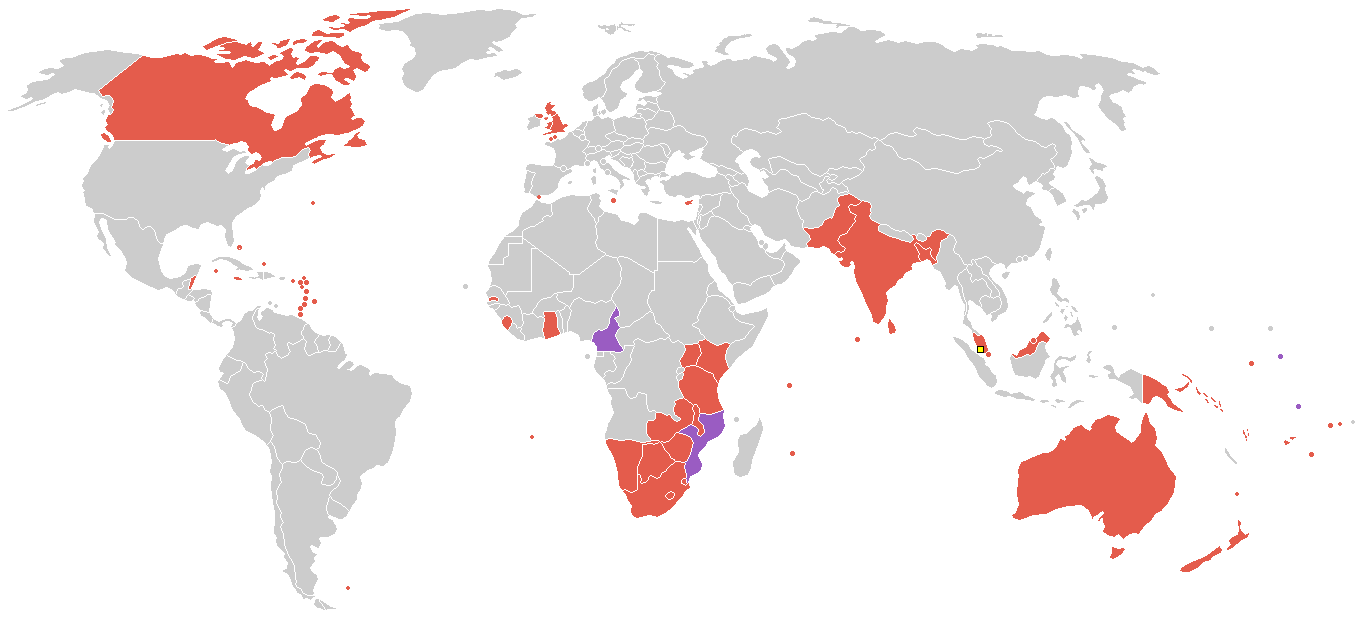
Participating countries. Countries who made their debut at the Games are coloured in purple.

69 Commonwealth Games Associations appeared at the 1998 Games. Cameroon, Kiribati, Mozambique and Tuvalu made their Commonwealth Games debut. The only absent country was Nigeria, which was suspended from the Commonwealth of Nations due to the tyrannical dictatorship of Sani Abacha who had died earlier that year.

Participating Commonwealth Games Associations
- Anguilla (3)
- Antigua and Barbuda (5)
- Australia (311)
- Bahamas (9)
- Bangladesh (25)
- Barbados (6)
- Belize (11)
- Bermuda (13)
- Botswana (40)
- British Virgin Islands (8)
- Brunei (10)
- Cameroon (19)
- Canada (245)
- Cayman Islands (2)
- Cook Islands (2)
- Cyprus (15)
- Dominica (3)
- England (265)
- Falkland Islands (6)
- Fiji (50)
- Ghana (42)
- Gibraltar (4)
- Grenada (5)
- Guernsey (14)
- Guyana (19)
- India (195)
- Isle of Man (1)
- Jamaica (28)
- Jersey (8)
- Kenya (103)
- Kiribati (29)
- Lesotho (34)
- Malawi (10)
- Malaysia (host) (240)
- Maldives (12)
- Malta (13)
- Mauritius (2)
- Montserrat (1)
- Mozambique (17)
- Namibia (21)
- Nauru (4)
- New Zealand (125)
- Norfolk Island (5)
- Northern Ireland (49)
- Pakistan (54)
- Papua New Guinea (37)
- Saint Helena and Dependencies (3)
- Saint Kitts and Nevis (2)
- Saint Lucia (2)
- Saint Vincent and the Grenadines (5)
- Samoa (16)
- Scotland (110)
- Seychelles (7)
- Sierra Leone (30)
- Singapore (71)
- Solomon Islands (6)
- South Africa (8)
- Sri Lanka (47)
- Swaziland (28)
- Tanzania (40)
- The Gambia (24)
- Tonga (11)
- Trinidad and Tobago (23)
- Turks and Caicos Islands (4)
- Tuvalu (8)
- Uganda (14)
- Vanuatu (1)
- Wales (232)
- Zambia (32)
- Zimbabwe (38)

== Calendar ==
OC	Opening ceremony	●	Event competitions	1	Gold medal events	CC	Closing ceremony

September		7th Mon	8th Tue	9th Wed	10th Thu	11th Fri	12th Sat	13th Sun	14th Mon	15th Tue	16th Wed	17th Thu	18th Fri	19th Sat	20th Sun	21st Mon	Events
Ceremonies						OC										CC	—N/a
Aquatics	Diving												2	2	2		6
Aquatics	Swimming						5	5	5	5	6	6					32
Aquatics	Artistic Swimming						●	●	1	1							2
Athletics											2	8	7	11	7	11	46
Badminton				●	●		●	●	2		●	●	●	●	3	2	7
Boxing							●	●	●	●	●	●	●		12		12
Cricket				●	●		●	●	●	●	●	●	●	1			1
Cycling							1	1	●	2		1	3	2	3		13
Gymnastics							1	1	2		10			1	1	4	20
Hockey				●	●		●	●	●	●	●	●		●	2		2
Lawn bowls							●	●	●	●	1	1	1	1	2		6
Netball									●	●	●	●	●	●		1	1
Rugby sevens							●	●	1								1
Shooting		●	●	●	●			5	4	4	2	4	5	3	4		31
Squash					●		●	●	●	●	2	●	●	●	3		5
Ten-pin bowling								2	1	●	2						5
Weightlifting											6	6	6	6			24
Daily medal events		0	0	0	0	0	7	14	16	12	31	26	24	27	39	18	214
Cumulative total		0	0	0	0	0	7	21	37	49	80	106	130	157	196	214	214
September		7th Mon	8th Tue	9th Wed	10th Thu	11th Fri	12th Sat	13th Sun	14th Mon	15th Tue	16th Wed	17th Thu	18th Fri	19th Sat	20th Sun	21st Mon	Events

== Sports overview ==
The host nation achieved its best-ever haul of ten gold medals, which has since been surpassed by its achievement in the 2010 Commonwealth Games, where Malaysia won twelve gold medals.

This is an edition marked by several unprecedented facts in the history of the Commonwealth Games. Not only because it was the first to be held in Asia and the first that was not opened by a member of the host nation's royal family. And, taking advantage of these factors, the Commonwealth Games Federation decided in 1994 that from this edition onwards, team sports could enter the Games program. As a result, the number of sports included rose from 10 to 16. The case studies determined that three team sports were eligible: field hockey (men and women), netball (women) and rugby 7's (men). Adding to aquatics (swimming) (athletics), boxing, badminton, cycling (road), weightlifting, and lawn bowls as compulsory sports. As decided also in 1994, the Organizing Committee could choose up to six sports from a list previously approved by the Commonwealth Games Federation (CGF) and which reflect their respective popularity in the host country; they were the following: aquatics (synchronized swimming and diving), cricket, cycling (track), gymnastics (artistic and rhythmic), and shooting sports. Another spot was reserved for squash, which was an evaluation sport and was in contention to become mandatory in the next edition. There was still a spot for a local sport, and the organizers chose ten-pin bowling, which was included as an extra sport because of its popularity in the country and also because of the presence of a newly constructed venue that could host the sport. However, there was some controversy surrounding the removal of wrestling that had been present in all previous editions because of its low popularity in Malaysia.

In front of 20,000 fans at the Petaling Jaya Stadium, rugby sevens in particular were an enormous success, with New Zealand collecting its 100th Commonwealth Games medal with a 21–12 win over reigning world champions Fiji. The man of the match was the Jonah Lomu, who had worked tirelessly during the last 10-minutes of the final. Led by veteran star David Campese, Australia took the bronze, beating Samoa 33–12. In the squash event, many had anticipated a close match between Michelle Martin and Sarah Fitz-Gerald, who had both comfortably won their respective semi-finals. Fitz-Gerald had won the previous two years' World Championships and Martin the three prior to that, and so it was with some surprise to many that Martin took the gold in three straight sets 9–0, 9–6, 9–5. Fitz-Gerald did avenge this defeat in the final of the world championship later that year, in what many people regard as the greatest women's final ever, coming back from 8–2 down in the fifth to retain her title. Martin also teamed up with Craig Rowland to take the Commonwealth mixed doubles gold. Erika-Leigh Stirton took five of the six available gold medals in the rhythmic gymnastics only being beaten into second place in the team event in the hosts took gold.

== Medal table ==
The ranking in this table is consistent with International Olympic Committee convention in its published medal tables. By default, the table is ordered by the number of gold medals the athletes from a nation have won (in this context, a "nation" is an entity represented by a Commonwealth Games Association). The number of silver medals is taken into consideration next and then the number of bronze medals. If nations are still tied, equal ranking is given and they are listed alphabetically by their three-letter country code.

Key

* Host nation (Malaysia)

Rank	Nation	Gold	Silver	Bronze	Total
1	Australia	80	61	57	198
2	England	36	47	53	136
3	Canada	30	31	38	99
4	Malaysia*	10	14	12	36
5	South Africa	9	11	13	33
6	New Zealand	8	6	20	34
7	India	7	10	8	25
8	Kenya	7	5	4	16
9	Jamaica	4	2	0	6
10	Wales	3	4	9	16
11	Scotland	3	2	7	12
12	Nauru	3	0	0	3
13	Northern Ireland	2	1	2	5
14	Zimbabwe	2	0	3	5
15	Ghana	1	1	3	5
16	Mauritius	1	1	2	4
17	Cyprus	1	1	1	3
17	Tanzania	1	1	1	3
17	Trinidad and Tobago	1	1	1	3
20	Bahamas	1	1	0	2
20	Mozambique	1	1	0	2
22	Barbados	1	0	2	3
23	Lesotho	1	0	0	1
24	Cameroon	0	3	3	6
25	Namibia	0	2	1	3
26	Seychelles	0	2	0	2
27	Sri Lanka	0	1	1	2
28	Bermuda	0	1	0	1
28	Fiji	0	1	0	1
28	Isle of Man	0	1	0	1
28	Pakistan	0	1	0	1
32	Papua New Guinea	0	0	1	1
32	Uganda	0	0	1	1
32	Zambia	0	0	1	1
Totals (34 entries)		213	213	244	670

== Marketing ==
=== Logo ===
Wira, the orangutan, the official mascot of the games.

The logo of the 1998 Commonwealth Games is an image of the national flower of Malaysia, the hibiscus (the bunga raya), the first games logo to introduce the colour yellow. (All previous logos had been red, white and blue to reflect the colours of the British Union Flag.) The red, blue, white and yellow colours represents the colours of the Malaysian national flag and Malaysia as a confident, young, dynamic nation. The yellow pollens represent the six regions of the world that includes the 68 Commonwealth member nations.

=== Mascot ===
The official mascot of the 1998 Commonwealth Games is an orangutan named Wira (Malay for "warrior" or "hero"). It is said that the orangutan is the largest and probably the most intelligent primate in Asia which lives in the tropical rainforests of Malaysia. The adoption of orangutan as a games' mascot is to represent the friendly personality of Malaysia as the games' host as well as the charm, intelligence, and sporting ability of the participating athletes.

=== Sponsors ===
A total of 55 companies and organisations sponsored the games, including Malaysian state-owned enterprises.

Sponsors of the 1998 Commonwealth Games
Official Partners
- Ajinomoto (bronze)
- Antah Holdings (gold)
- BP (gold)
- Chiyoda Corporation (bronze)
- Colgate-Palmolive (gold)
- Genting Group (Resorts World) (platinum)
- Golden Hope (silver)
- IOI Group (silver)
- Island & Peninsular (bronze)
- Kuala Lumpur Stock Exchange (gold)
- Malaysian Industrial Development Finance (bronze)
- Pos Malaysia (gold)
- Sime Darby (gold)
- Sunway Group (bronze)
- Tenaga Nasional (gold)
- Tourism Publications Corporation (bronze)
Official Sponsors
- Astro
- Bank Bumiputera Malaysia
- Canon Inc.
- DRB-HICOM
- Kodak
- Leopex
- Malaysia Airlines
- Mastercard
- Maybank (Mayban Life Assurance)
- Pensonic Group
- Nestlé (Milo)
- PepsiCo
- Percetakan Nasional Malaysia Berhad
- Petronas
- Siemens
- Siemens Nixdorf
- Swatch
- Telekom Malaysia
Official Suppliers
- Aramas Utama
- Cereal Partners Worldwide
- Clipsal
- Electcoms
- Extol
- Faber-Castell
- Goldtronics
- Grace Distribution
- Konsortium Perkapalan
- Macroworld
- Microsoft
- NetCard
- Permanis
- P.K. Electronics
- Royal Selangor
- Perodua
- Pernec Corporation
- Selvex
- Sema Group
- Teknologi Ikram
- Telekom Cellular
- T.H. Alliance
- Unilever (Wall’s)

== See also ==
- Sport in Malaysia

Preceded by Victoria	Commonwealth Games; Kuala Lumpur; XVI Commonwealth Games	Succeeded by Manchester
