= Malaya at the Commonwealth Games =

Malaysia at the Commonwealth Games
- Flag of Malaya
- CGF code: MAL
- CGA: Federation of Malaya Olympic Council
- Website: olympic.org.my
- Medals Ranked 37th: Gold 2 Silver 3 Bronze 2 Total 7

Commonwealth Games appearances (overview)
- 1950; 1954; 1958; 1962; 1966; 1970; 1974; 1978; 1982; 1986; 1990; 1994; 1998; 2002; 2006; 2010; 2014; 2018; 2022; 2026; 2030

The Federation of Malaya sent teams to three Commonwealth Games. Their first were in 1950, and they also attended in 1958 and 1962. They won seven medals, all in Weightlifting. Athletes from Malaya continued to compete for Malaysia when that country was established in 1963.

British North Borneo (NB) (now Sabah) and Sarawak (SAR) also competed separately at the 1958 and 1962 Games (but not winning any medals), and competed as part of Malaysia from 1966.

== List of medalists ==
| Medal | Name | Games | Sport | Event |
|---|---|---|---|---|
| Gold | Tho Fook Hung | (New Zealand) 1950 Auckland | Weightlifting | Men's 56 kg |
| Gold | Koh Eng Tong | (New Zealand) 1950 Auckland | Weightlifting | Men's 60 kg |
| Silver | Thong Saw Pak | (New Zealand) 1950 Auckland | Weightlifting | Men's 67.5 kg |
| Bronze | Tan Kim Bee | (New Zealand) 1950 Auckland | Weightlifting | Men's 82.5 kg |
| Silver | Chung Kum Weng | (Wales) 1958 Cardiff | Weightlifting | Men's 60 kg |
| Silver | Tan Kim Bee | (Wales) 1958 Cardiff | Weightlifting | Men's 90 kg |
| Bronze | Cheong K. H. | (Australia) 1962 Perth | Weightlifting | Men's 60 kg |

== Medals by Games ==
| Games | Gold | Silver | Bronze | Total |
|---|---|---|---|---|
| 1950 Auckland | 2 | 1 | 1 | 4 |
| 1958 Cardiff | 0 | 2 | 0 | 2 |
| 1962 Perth | 0 | 0 | 1 | 1 |
| Totals (3 entries) | 2 | 3 | 2 | 7 |

== Medals by sport ==
| Sport | Gold | Silver | Bronze | Total |
|---|---|---|---|---|
| Weightlifting | 2 | 3 | 2 | 7 |
| Totals (1 entries) | 2 | 3 | 2 | 7 |
