= Malaysia at the Commonwealth Games =

- CG code: MAS
- CGA: Olympic Council of Malaysia
- Website: olympic.org.my
- Medals Ranked 12th: Gold 74 Silver 78 Bronze 94 Total 246

Commonwealth Games appearances (overview)
- 1950; 1954; 1958; 1962; 1966; 1970; 1974; 1978; 1982; 1986; 1990; 1994; 1998; 2002; 2006; 2010; 2014; 2018; 2022; 2026; 2030

Other related appearances
- British North Borneo (1958, 1962); Sarawak (1958, 1962)

Malaysia (abbreviated MAS) has competed in all the Commonwealth Games held from 1966. In 1998 they became the first Asian nation to host the Games.

In 1950, 1958, and 1962 the country competed as Malaya (MAL), see Malaya at the Commonwealth Games.

In 1958 and 1962, North Borneo (BNB) (now Sabah) and Sarawak (SAR) competed separately at the Commonwealth Games (but not winning any medals). They both became states within the new country of Malaysia in 1963.

Malaysia has experienced significant success at the Games, with Badminton and Weightlifting its most productive sports.

== Host nation ==
Malaysia has hosted the Games once, in 1998, at Kuala Lumpur.

== Commonwealth Games ==
=== Medals by Games ===
At the 2026 Commonwealth Games, Malaysia was tenth in the medal tally and twelfth in the all-time tally of medals, with an overall total of 246 medals (74 gold, 78 silver, and 94 bronze).

*Red border color indicates the tournament was held on home soil.

Games	Gold	Silver	Bronze	Total	Rank
(Canada) 1930 Hamilton	Did not participate				
(England) 1934 London	Did not participate				
(Australia) 1938 Sydney	Did not participate				
(New Zealand) 1950 Auckland	See Malaya^{[a]}				
(Canada) 1954 Vancouver	Did not participate				
(Wales) 1958 Cardiff	0	2	0	2	15
(Australia) 1962 Perth	See Malaya^{[a]}				
(Jamaica) 1966 Kingston	2	2	1	5	12
(Scotland) 1970 Edinburgh	1	1	1	3	15
(New Zealand) 1974 Christchurch	1	0	3	4	15
(Canada) 1978 Edmonton	1	2	1	4	12
(Australia) 1982 Brisbane	1	0	1	2	13
(Scotland) 1986 Edinburgh	Did not participate				
(New Zealand) 1990 Auckland	2	2	0	4	10
(Canada) 1994 Victoria	2	3	2	7	14
(Malaysia) 1998 Kuala Lumpur	10	14	12	36	4
(England) 2002 Manchester	7	9	18	34	8
(Australia) 2006 Melbourne	7	12	10	29	8
(India) 2010 Delhi	12	10	14	36	7
(Scotland) 2014 Glasgow	6	7	6	19	12
(Australia) 2018 Gold Coast	7	5	12	24	12
(England) 2022 Birmingham	7	8	8	23	10
(Scotland) 2026 Glasgow	8	3	5	16	10
(India) 2030 Amdavad	Future event				
Total	74	78	94	246	12

- ^[a] The Federation of Malaya sent teams to three Commonwealth Games. Their first were in 1950, and they also attended in 1958 and 1962. British North Borneo (NB) (now Sabah) and Sarawak (SAR) also competed separately at the 1958 and 1962 Games, and competed as part of Malaysia from 1966.

=== Medals by sport ===
Updated after the 2026 Commonwealth Games

Sport	Gold	Silver	Bronze	Total
Badminton	31	22	16	69
Weightlifting	19	8	19	46
Gymnastics	5	12	14	31
Lawn bowls	4	7	9	20
Shooting	3	10	14	27
Diving	3	8	6	17
Athletics	2	1	3	6
Squash	2	1	3	6
Ten-pin bowling	2	1	1	4
Cycling	1	2	3	6
Boxing	1	0	2	3
Judo	1	0	1	2
Table tennis	0	3	2	5
Hockey	0	1	1	2
Swimming	0	1	1	2
Archery	0	1	0	1
Totals (16 entries)	74	78	95	247

=== Medals by individual ===
Athlete	Sport	Years	Gender	Gold	Silver	Bronze	Total
Lee Chong Wei	Badminton	2006–2018	M	5	1	0	6
Koo Kien Keat	Badminton	2006–2010	M	5	0	0	5
Chin Eei Hui	Badminton	2002–2010	F	4	1	1	6
Amirul Hamizan Ibrahim	Weightlifting	2002–2010	M	4	0	0	4
Wong Choong Hann	Badminton	1998–2006	M	3	2	1	6
Choong Tan Fook	Badminton	1998–2006	M	3	2	0	5
Chan Peng Soon	Badminton	2010–2022	M	3	1	1	5
Vivian Hoo	Badminton	2014–2018	F	3	1	0	4
Siti Zalina Ahmad	Lawn bowls	2002–2022	F	3	0	2	5
Chan Chong Ming	Badminton	2002–2006	M	3	0	0	3
Woon Khe Wei	Badminton	2010–2014	F	3	0	0	3
Aznil Bidin	Weightlifting	2018–2026	M	3	0	0	2
Cheah Soon Kit	Badminton	1990–1998	M	2	3	0	5
Pandelela Rinong	Diving	2014–2018	F	2	2	1	5
Rashid Sidek	Badminton	1990–1994	M	2	2	0	4
Wong Mew Choo	Badminton	2006–2010	F	2	2	0	4
Nicol David	Squash	2002–2018	F	2	1	1	4
Goh V Shem	Badminton	2014–2018	M	2	1	1	4
Tan Wee Kiong	Badminton	2014–2018	M	2	1	1	4
Punch Gunalan	Badminton	1970–1974	M	2	0	1	3
Razif Sidek	Badminton	1982–1990	M	2	0	1	3
Wong Pei Tty	Badminton	2002–2006	F	2	0	1	3
Lai Pei Jing	Badminton	2014–2022	F	2	0	1	3
Tan Aik Huang	Badminton	1966	M	2	0	0	2
Kenny Ang	Ten-pin bowling	1998	M	2	0	0	2
Lee Wan Wah	Badminton	1998	M	2	0	0	2
Muhammad Hafiz Hashim	Badminton	2002–2010	M	2	0	0	2
Tan Boon Heong	Badminton	2010	M	2	0	0	2
Pearly Tan	Badminton	2022	F	2	0	0	2
Thinaah Muralitharan	Badminton	2022	F	2	0	0	2
Ng Joe Ee	Gymnastics	2022	F	2	0	0	2
Aniq Kasdan	Weightlifting	2022–2026	M	2	0	0	2

=== Records ===
Updated after the 2022 Commonwealth Games

Key

- WR = World record
- GR = Games record
- AS = Asian record
- NR = National record

Type	Sport	Events	Athlete / Team	Games	Result
GR	Weightlifting	Men's 55kg Clean & jerk	Aniq Kasdan	2022 Birmingham	142.0 kg
GR	Weightlifting	Men's 61 kg Snatch	Aznil Bidin	2022 Birmingham	127.0 kg
GR	Weightlifting	Men's 61 kg Clean & jerk	Aznil Bidin	2022 Birmingham	158.0 kg
GR	Weightlifting	Men's 61 kg Total	Aznil Bidin	2022 Birmingham	285.0 kg
GR	Weightlifting	Men's 56 kg Snatch	Azroy Hazalwafie	2018 Gold Coast	117.0 kg
GR	Weightlifting	Men's 56 kg	Azroy Hazalwafie	2018 Gold Coast	261.0 kg
NR	Swimming	Men's 4 × 200 metre freestyle relay	Kevin Yeap; Lim Ching Hwang; Vernon Lee; Welson Sim	2014 Glasgow	7:26.74
NR	Swimming	Women's 50 metre freestyle	Chui Lai Kwan	2014 Glasgow	26.00
NR	Swimming	Men's 50 metre backstroke	Alex Lim	2002 Manchester	25.67
GR	Weightlifting	Men's 56 kg clean and jerk	Amirul Hamizan Ibrahim	2002 Manchester	145.0 kg
GR	Bowling	Men's singles	Kenny Ang	1998 Kuala Lumpur	6046 points
GR	Bowling	Men's doubles	Ben Heng; Kenny Ang	1998 Kuala Lumpur	3552 points
NR	Athletics	Men's 3,000 metres steeplechase	Nainasagoram Shanmuganathan	1998 Kuala Lumpur	8:59.10
NR	Athletics	Men's 10,000 metres	Ramachandran Murusamy	1994 Victoria	29:30.29

== Commonwealth Youth Games ==
Malaysia at the Commonwealth Youth Games
- CG code: MAS
- CGA: Olympic Council of Malaysia
- Medals Ranked 7th: Gold 26 Silver 23 Bronze 20 Total 69

Commonwealth Youth Games appearances
- 2000; 2004; 2008; 2011; 2015; 2017; 2023

=== Medals by Games ===
Games	Gold	Silver	Bronze	Total	Rank
(Scotland) 2000 Edinburgh	1	3	5	9	7
(Australia) 2004 Bendigo	6	9	3	18	6
(India) 2008 Pune	3	4	6	13	7
2011 Isle of Man	4	2	1	7	8
(Samoa) 2015 Apia	11	3	3	17	4
(The Bahamas) 2017 Bahamas	0	0	0	0	–
(Trinidad and Tobago) 2023 Trinbago	1	2	2	5	14
2027 Malta	Future event				
Total	26	23	20	69	7

== See also ==
- Malaysia at the Olympics
- Malaysia at the Asian Games
