= Malaysia at the 1966 British Empire and Commonwealth Games =

- CGF code: MAS
- CGA: Olympic Council of Malaysia
- Website: olympic.org.my

in Kingston, Jamaica
- Competitors: 18 in 5 sports
- Medals Ranked 12th: Gold 3 Silver 2 Bronze 1 Total 6

British Empire and Commonwealth Games appearances
- 1950; 1954; 1958; 1962; 1966; 1970; 1974; 1978; 1982; 1986; 1990; 1994; 1998; 2002; 2006; 2010; 2014; 2018; 2022; 2026; 2030

Other related appearances
- British North Borneo (1958, 1962); Sarawak (1958, 1962)

Malaysia competed for the first time in the 1966 British Empire and Commonwealth Games held in Kingston, Jamaica from 4 to 13 August 1966.

== Medal summary ==
=== Medals by sport ===
Sport	Gold	Silver	Bronze	Total	Rank
Badminton	2	2	1	5	2
Weightlifting	1	0	0	1	6
Total	3	2	1	6	12

=== Medallists ===
Medal	Name	Sport	Event
Gold	Tan Aik Huang	Badminton	Men's singles
Gold	Tan Aik Huang; Yew Cheng Hoe	Badminton	Men's doubles
Gold	Chung Kum Weng	Weightlifting	Men's featherweight
Silver	Yew Cheng Hoe	Badminton	Men's singles
Silver	Ng Boon Bee; Tan Yee Khan	Badminton	Men's doubles
Bronze	Rosalind Singha Ang; Teoh Siew Yong	Badminton	Women's doubles

== Athletics ==
Men
Track events

Athlete	Event	Heat		Quarterfinal		Semifinal		Final	
Athlete	Event	Time	Rank	Time	Rank	Time	Rank	Time	Rank
Mani Jegathesan	100 yards	did not start		did not advance					
Mani Jegathesan	220 yards		Q		Q		Q	21.5	8
Mani Jegathesan	440 yards	48.9		—		did not advance			
Ramsay Subramaniam	880 yards	1:52.6	5	—		did not advance			
Ramsay Subramaniam	1 mile	4:16.6	7	—				did not advance	
Dilbagh Singh Kler	3 miles	—						14:54.8	19
Dilbagh Singh Kler	3000 metres steeplechase	—						9:53.2	11

Field events

Athlete	Event	Final	
Athlete	Event	Distance	Rank
Nashatar Singh Sidhu	Shot put	did not start	
Nashatar Singh Sidhu	Javelin throw	69.35	4

Women
Track events

Athlete	Event	Heat		Final	
Athlete	Event	Time	Rank	Time	Rank
Mary Rajamani	440 yards	57.8	4	did not advance	
Mary Rajamani	880 yards	2:17.8	6	did not advance	

Key

- Note–Ranks given for track events are within the athlete's heat only
- Q = Qualified for the next round
- q = Qualified for the next round as a fastest loser or, in field events, by position without achieving the qualifying target
- NR = National record
- N/A = Round not applicable for the event
- Bye = Athlete not required to compete in round

== Badminton ==
Athlete	Event	Round of 32	Round of 16	Quarterfinal	Semifinal	Final	Rank
Athlete	Event	Opposition Score	Opposition Score	Opposition Score	Opposition Score	Opposition Score	Rank
Tan Aik Huang	Men's singles	W	W	W	W	Gold medal match Yew Cheng Hoe (MAS); W	1st place, gold medalist(s)
Tan Yee Khan	Men's singles	W	L	did not advance			
Yew Cheng Hoe	Men's singles	W	W	W	W	Gold medal match Tan Aik Huang (MAS); L	2nd place, silver medalist(s)
Ng Boon Bee; Tan Yee Khan	Men's doubles	—	W	W	W	Gold medal match Tan Aik Huang; Yew Cheng Hoe (MAS); L	2nd place, silver medalist(s)
Tan Aik Huang; Yew Cheng Hoe	Men's doubles	—	W	W	W	Gold medal match Ng Boon Bee; Tan Yee Khan (MAS); W	1st place, gold medalist(s)
Rosalind Singha Ang	Women's singles	—	L	did not advance			
Teoh Siew Yong	Women's singles	—	W	L	did not advance		
Rosalind Singha Ang; Teoh Siew Yong	Women's doubles	—	W	W	W	Bronze medal match Alison Glenie; Gaynor Simpson (NZL); W	3rd place, bronze medalist(s)
Ng Boon Bee; Teoh Siew Yong	Mixed doubles	—	W	L	did not advance		
Tan Yee Khan; Rosalind Singha Ang	Mixed doubles	—	W	L	did not advance		

== Shooting ==
Men

Athlete	Event	Final	
Athlete	Event	Points	Rank
Tan Seng Keat	50 m rifle prone	566	26

== Swimming ==
Men

Athlete	Event	Heat		Final	
Athlete	Event	Time	Rank	Time	Rank
Cheah Tong Kim	110 yards freestyle		Q	1:15.9	8
Cheah Tong Kim	110 yards backstroke	2:51.6	7	did not advance	

== Weightlifting ==
Men

Athlete	Event	Military press		Snatch		Clean & jerk		Total	Rank
Athlete	Event	Result	Rank	Result	Rank	Result	Rank	Total	Rank
Chung Kum Weng	60 kg							337	1st place, gold medalist(s)
Cheah Sek Tong	67.5 kg			–	–	–	–	–	DNF
Teo Tong A.	75 kg			–	–	–	–	–	DNF
Yap Meng S.	82.5 kg			–	–	–	–	–	DNF
Leong Chim Seong	90 kg			–	–	–	–	–	DNF
