= Malaysia at the 1998 Commonwealth Games =

- CG code: MAS
- CGA: Olympic Council of Malaysia
- Website: olympic.org.my

in Kuala Lumpur, Malaysia
- Competitors: 240 in 15 sports
- Medals Ranked 4th: Gold 10 Silver 14 Bronze 12 Total 36

Commonwealth Games appearances (overview)
- 1950; 1954; 1958; 1962; 1966; 1970; 1974; 1978; 1982; 1986; 1990; 1994; 1998; 2002; 2006; 2010; 2014; 2018; 2022; 2026; 2030

Other related appearances
- British North Borneo (1958, 1962); Sarawak (1958, 1962)

Malaysia competed in the 1998 Commonwealth Games as the host nation in Kuala Lumpur from 11 to 21 September 1998.

== Medal summary ==
=== Medals by sport ===
Sport	Gold	Silver	Bronze	Total	Rank
Aquatics	0	0	0	0	0
Athletics	1	0	0	1	12
Badminton	3	4	0	7	1
Boxing	1	0	1	2	4
Cricket	0	0	0	0	0
Cycling	0	1	0	1	5
Gymnastics	1	1	2	4	5
Hockey	0	1	0	1	3
Lawn bowls	0	1	2	3	7
Netball	0	0	0	0	0
Rugby sevens	0	0	0	0	0
Shooting	1	4	3	8	5
Squash	0	0	0	0	0
Ten-pin bowling	2	1	1	4	2
Weightlifting	1	1	3	5	7
Total	10	14	12	36	4

=== Multiple medalists ===
Malaysian competitors that have won at least two medals.

Name	Sport	Gold	Silver	Bronze	Total
Choong Tan Fook	Badminton	2			2
Kenny Ang	Ten-pin bowling	2			2
Lee Wan Wah	Badminton	2			2
Wong Choong Hann	Badminton	2			2
Thye Chee Kiat	Gymnastics	1	1	1	3
Cheah Soon Kit	Badminton	1	1		2
Muhammad Hidayat Hamidon	Weightlifting	1	1		2
Yap Kim Hock	Badminton	1	1		2
Yong Hock Kin	Badminton	1	1		2
Carolyn Au Yong	Gymnastics	1		1	2
Chor Hooi Yee	Badminton		2		2
Lim Pek Siah	Badminton		2		2
Mohammed Emran Zakaria	Shooting		2		2
Bibiana Ng Pei Chin	Shooting		1	1	2
Lai Kin Ngoh	Ten-pin bowling		1	1	2
Matin Guntali	Weightlifting			3	3

=== Medallists ===
The following Malaysian competitors won medals at the games; all dates are for September 1998.

Medal	Name	Sport	Event	Date
Gold	Govindasamy Saravanan	Athletics	Men's 50 kilometres walk	21
Gold	Wong Choong Hann	Badminton	Men's singles	21
Gold	Choong Tan Fook; Lee Wan Wah	Badminton	Men's doubles	21
Gold	Cheah Soon Kit; Choong Tan Fook; Lee Wan Wah; Ong Ewe Hock; Wong Choong Hann; Yap Kim Hock; Yong Hock Kin	Badminton	Men's team	14
Gold	Sapok Biki	Boxing	Men's light flyweight (48 kg)	20
Gold	Carolyn Au Yong; El Regina Tajudin; Sarina Sundara Rajah; Thye Chee Kiat	Gymnastics	Women's rhythmic team all-around	19
Gold	Nurul Huda Baharin	Shooting	Women's air rifle individual	18
Gold	Kenny Ang	Ten-pin bowling	Men's singles	16
Gold	Kenny Ang; Ben Heng	Ten-pin bowling	Men's doubles	13
Gold	Muhamad Hidayat Hamidon	Weightlifting	Men's 69 kg clean and jerk	17
Silver	Yong Hock Kin	Badminton	Men's singles	21
Silver	Cheah Soon Kit; Yap Kim Hock	Badminton	Men's doubles	21
Silver	Chor Hooi Yee; Lim Pek Siah	Badminton	Women's doubles	20
Silver	Chor Hooi Yee; Joanne Quay; Law Pei Pei; Lim Pek Siah; Ng Mee Fen; Norhasikin Amin; Woon Sze Mei	Badminton	Women's team	14
Silver	Rosli Effandy	Cycling	Men's 184 kilometres road race	13
Silver	Thye Chee Kiat	Gymnastics	Women's rhythmic hoop	21
Silver	Nur Azlan Bakar Nor Saiful Zaini Mirnawan Nawawi Roslan Jamaluddin Calvin Fernandez Gobinathan Krishnamurthy Maninderjit Singh Chairil Anwar Abdul Aziz K.Keevan Raj Jihan Shanmuganathan Mohd Madzli Ikmar R.Shanker M.Kaliswaran K.Logan Raj Mohamad Syayrin Uda Karim Suhaimi Ibrahim Chua Boon Huat	Hockey	Men's tournament	20
Silver	Saedah Abdul Rahim	Lawn bowls	Women's singles	20
Silver	Mohammed Emran Zakaria	Shooting	Men's air rifle individual	
Silver	Abdul Mutalib Abdul Razak; Mohammed Emran Zakaria	Shooting	Men's air rifle pairs	13
Silver	Zainal Abidin Md Zain	Shooting	Open full bore rifle Queens prize individual	18
Silver	Bibiana Ng Pei Chin	Shooting	Women's sport pistol individual	13
Silver	Lai Kin Ngoh; Shalin Zulkifli	Ten-pin bowling	Women's doubles	13
Silver	Muhamad Hidayat Hamidon	Weightlifting	Men's 69 kg combined	17
Bronze	Adnan Yusoh	Boxing	Men's bantamweight (54 kg)	18
Bronze	Carolyn Au Yong	Gymnastics	Women's rhythmic ribbon	21
Bronze	Thye Chee Kiat	Gymnastics	Women's rhythmic rope	21
Bronze	Mohamed Aziz Maswadi; Mohamed Tazman Tahir	Lawn bowls	Men's doubles	19
Bronze	Haslah Hassan; Nor Azwa; Nor Hashimah Ismail; Siti Zalina Ahmad	Lawn bowls	Women's fours	
Bronze	Kamisah Abdul Jalal; Suriani Othman	Shooting	Women's air pistol pairs	18
Bronze	Roslina Bakar	Shooting	Women's free rifle three positions individual	19
Bronze	Bibiana Ng Pei Chin; Norsita Mahmud	Shooting	Women's sport pistol pairs	13
Bronze	Lai Kin Ngoh	Ten-pin bowling	Women's singles	16
Bronze	Matin Guntali	Weightlifting	Men's 56 kg snatch	12
Bronze	Matin Guntali	Weightlifting	Men's 56 kg clean and jerk	12
Bronze	Matin Guntali	Weightlifting	Men's 56 kg combined	12

== Athletics ==
Men
Track and road events

Athlete	Event	Heat		Quarterfinal		Semifinal		Final	
Athlete	Event	Result	Rank	Result	Rank	Result	Rank	Result	Rank
Hamberi Mahat	100 m	10.58	18 q	10.49	22	did not advance			
Raman Ganeshwaran	100 m	10.82	30	did not advance					
Watson Nyambek	100 m	10.36	9 Q	10.43	20	did not advance			
Azmi Ibrahim	200 m	21.60	28 q	21.65	27	did not advance			
Nazmizan Muhamad	200 m	21.47 PB	24 q	21.46 PB	24	did not advance			
Raman Ganeshwaran	200 m	21.78	32	did not advance					
Nadarajan Deverajo	400 m	Bye		48.77	14	did not advance			
Romzi Bakar	400 m	Bye		47.12	8	did not advance			
Yazid Parlan	400 m	48.18	3	did not advance					
Subramaniam Vasu	800 m	1:49.76	21	—N/a		did not advance			
Arumugam Munusamy	1500 m	3:48.34	12 q	—N/a				3:47.70	12
Munusamy Ramachandran	5000 m	14:57.42	9	—N/a				did not advance	
Munusamy Ramachandran	10,000 m	—N/a						31:45.79	12
Nur Herman Majid	110 m hurdles	14.13	11	—N/a				did not advance	
Nainasagoram Shanmuganathan	3000 m steeplechase	—N/a						8:59.10 NR	9
Hamberi Mahat; Raman Ganeshwaran; Tan Kok Lim; Watson Nyambek	4 × 100 m relay	40.31	10	—N/a				did not advance	
Deverajo Nadarajan; Mohd Zaiful Zainal Abidin; Romzi Bakar; Yazid Parlan	4 × 400 m relay	3:08.18 PB	14	—N/a				did not advance	
Harbans Narinder Singh	20 km walk	—N/a						1:30:13	9
Mohd Sharrulhaizy Abdul Rahman	20 km walk	—N/a						1:36:32 PB	15
Teoh Boon Lim	20 km walk	—N/a						1:27:47 PB	6
Govindasamy Saravanan	50 km walk	—N/a						4:10:05 NR	1st place, gold medalist(s)
Kannian Pushparajan	50 km walk	—N/a						4:31:22	7
Thirukumaran Balaysendaran	50 km walk	—N/a						4:44:33	9

Field events

Athlete	Event	Qualification		Final	
Athlete	Event	Distance	Position	Distance	Position
Loo Kum Zee	High jump	—N/a		2.20	7
Mohamed Zaki Sadri	Long jump	7.52	12 q	7.23	10
Chai Song Lip	Long jump	6.82	19	did not advance	
Mohamed Zaki Sadri	Triple jump	—N/a		15.94	8
Chai Song Lip	Triple jump	—N/a		14.86	11
Wong Tee Kue	Hammer throw	—N/a		53.06	11
Mohamed Yazid Imran	Javelin throw	—N/a		62.49	11

Women
Track and road events

Athlete	Event	Heat		Quarterfinal		Semifinal		Final	
Athlete	Event	Result	Rank	Result	Rank	Result	Rank	Result	Rank
Shanti Govindasamy	100 m	Bye		—N/a		11.58	10	did not advance	
Shanti Govindasamy	200 m	23.77	12 q	—N/a		23.72	10	did not advance	
Kuganeswari Palaniappan	400 m	56.73	24	—N/a		did not advance			
Manimegalay Nadarajah	400 m	53.71 PB	16 q	—N/a		54.02	15	did not advance	
Rathimalar Supramaniam	400 m	58.75	26	—N/a		did not advance			
Soloseeni Krishnan	800 m	2:09.45	20	—N/a		did not advance			
Kuganeswari Palaniappan; Manimegalay Nadarajah; Shanti Govindasamy; Soloseeni Krishnan	4 × 400 m relay	DNF		—N/a				did not advance	
Annastasia Raj	10 km walk	—N/a						46:41	5
Cheng Tong Lean	10 km walk	—N/a						DSQ	
Yuan Yufang	10 km walk	—N/a						DSQ	

Key

- Note–Ranks given for track events are within the athlete's heat only
- Q = Qualified for the next round
- q = Qualified for the next round as a fastest loser or, in field events, by position without achieving the qualifying target
- NR = National record
- N/A = Round not applicable for the event
- Bye = Athlete not required to compete in round

== Badminton ==
Athlete	Event	Round of 128	Round of 64	Round of 32	Round of 16	Quarterfinal	Semifinal	Final	Rank
Athlete	Event	Opposition Score	Opposition Score	Opposition Score	Opposition Score	Opposition Score	Opposition Score	Opposition Score	Rank
Ong Ewe Hock	Men's singles	W	L	did not advance					
Wong Choong Hann	Men's singles	W	W	Michael Watt (NIR); W 15–6, 15–9	Richard Vaughan (WAL); W 15–6, 15–9	Mark Constable (ENG); W 15–3, 15–1	Pullela Gopichand (IND); W 15–1, 15–11	Gold medal match Yong Hock Kin (MAS); W 10–15, 15–12, 15–6	1st place, gold medalist(s)
Yong Hock Kin	Men's singles	W	W	Abhinshyam Gupta (IND); W 15–4, 15–4	Geraint Lewis (WAL); W 15–3, 15–2	Bruce Flockhart (SCO); W 15–5, 15–6	Darren Hall (ENG); W 15–7, 15–1	Gold medal match Wong Choong Hann (MAS); L 15–10, 12–15, 6–15	2nd place, silver medalist(s)
Cheah Soon Kit; Yap Kim Hock	Men's doubles	—N/a	W	W	Stephan Beeharry; Geenesh Dussain (MRI); W	Bryan Moody; Mike Beres (CAN); W	Julian Robertson; Nathan Robertson (ENG); W 15–2, 12–15, 15–8	Gold medal match Choong Tan Fook; Lee Wan Wah (MAS); L 7–15, 4–15	2nd place, silver medalist(s)
Choong Tan Fook; Lee Wan Wah	Men's doubles	—N/a	W	W	Denise Constantin; Edouard Clarisse (MRI); W	Peter Blackburn; David Bamford (AUS); W	Simon Archer; Chris Hunt (ENG); W 15–13, 15–11	Gold medal match Cheah Soon Kit; Yap Kim Hock (MAS); W 15–7, 15–4	1st place, gold medalist(s)
Law Pei Pei	Women's singles	—N/a	W	L	did not advance				
Ng Mee Fen	Women's singles	—N/a	W	Li Feng (NZL); W 11–4, 15–3	Michelle Claire Edwards (RSA); W 11–2, 11–2	Aparna Popat (IND); L 7–11, 10–13	did not advance		
Woon Sze Mei	Women's singles	—N/a	W	P. V. V. Lakshmi (IND); W 8–11, 11–1, 11–3	Rhona Robertson (NZL); L 2–11, 3–11	did not advance			
Joanne Quay; Norhasikin Amin	Women's doubles	—N/a	W	W	W	Elinor Middlemiss; Sandra Watt (SCO); L	did not advance		
Chor Hooi Yee; Lim Pek Siah	Women's doubles	—N/a	W	W	W	Rhonda Cator; Amanda Hardy (AUS); W	Rhona Robertson; Tammy Jenkins (NZL); W	Gold medal match Joanne Goode; Donna Kellogg (ENG); L 8–15, 6–15	2nd place, silver medalist(s)
Cheah Soon Kit; Joanne Quay	Mixed doubles	—N/a	W	W	Simon Archer; Joanne Goode (ENG); L	did not advance			
Yap Kim Hock; Law Pei Pei	Mixed doubles	—N/a	W	? (NZL); L	did not advance				
Wong Choong Hann; Chor Hooi Yee	Mixed doubles	—N/a	W	W	Iain Sydie; Denyse Julien (CAN); W	Peter Blackburn; Rhonda Cator (AUS); L 13–15, 15–1, 7–15	did not advance		

=== Men's team ===
Pool A

Team	Pld	W	L	GW	GL	GD	PW	PL	PD
Malaysia	3	3	0	30	0	+30			
Canada	3	3	0	20	12	+8			
Northern Ireland	3	1	2	12	21	-9			
Jamaica	3	0	3	1	30	-29			

Qualified for the final round

Jamaica
0
Kuala Lumpur Badminton Stadium
9 September

Malaysia
5

			1	2	3
1	(Jamaica) (Malaysia)	Bradley Graham; Ong Ewe Hock
2	(Jamaica) (Malaysia)	Roy Paul; Yong Hock Kin
3	(Jamaica) (Malaysia)	Andre Stewart; Wong Choong Hann
4	(Jamaica) (Malaysia)	Robert Richards / Roy Paul; Cheah Soon Kit / Yap Kim Hock
5	(Jamaica) (Malaysia)	Charles Pyne / Andre Stewart; Choong Tan Fook / Lee Wan Wah

Malaysia
5
Kuala Lumpur Badminton Stadium
10 September

Northern Ireland
0

			1	2	3
1	(Malaysia) (Northern Ireland)	Ong Ewe Hock; Leslie Dewart
2	(Malaysia) (Northern Ireland)	Yong Hock Kin; David Geddes
3	(Malaysia) (Northern Ireland)	Wong Choong Hann; Michael Watt
4	(Malaysia) (Northern Ireland)	Cheah Soon Kit / Yap Kim Hock; Bruce Topping / Mark Topping
5	(Malaysia) (Northern Ireland)	Choong Tan Fook / Lee Wan Wah; Graham Henderson / Eugene McKenna

Malaysia
5
Kuala Lumpur Badminton Stadium
12 September

Canada
0

			1	2	3
1	(Malaysia) (Canada)	Ong Ewe Hock; Mike Beres	15; 3	15; 6
2	(Malaysia) (Canada)	Yong Hock Kin; Bobby Milroy	15; 3	15; 5
3	(Malaysia) (Canada)	Wong Choong Hann; Stuart Arthur	15; 2	15; 2
4	(Malaysia) (Canada)	Cheah Soon Kit / Yap Kim Hock; Iain Sydie / Darryl Yung	15; 5	15; 9
5	(Malaysia) (Canada)	Choong Tan Fook / Lee Wan Wah; Bryan Moody / Mike Beres	15; 11	15; 9

Final round

Rank	Team	Pld	W	L	GW	GL	GD	PW	PL	PD
1st place, gold medalist(s)	Malaysia	2	2	0	20	2	+18			
2nd place, silver medalist(s)	India	2	2	0	14	8	+6			
3rd place, bronze medalist(s)	England	2	0	2	7	16	-9			
3rd place, bronze medalist(s)	New Zealand	2	0	2	3	18	-15			

Malaysia
5
Kuala Lumpur Badminton Stadium
14 September

New Zealand
0

			1	2	3
1	(Malaysia) (New Zealand)	Yong Hock Kin; Nicholas Hall
2	(Malaysia) (New Zealand)	Choong Tan Fook / Lee Wan Wah; Anton Gargiulo / Geoff Bellingham
3	(Malaysia) (New Zealand)	Wong Choong Hann; Jarrod King
4	(Malaysia) (New Zealand)	Cheah Soon Kit / Yap Kim Hock; Dean Galt / Daniel Shirley
5	(Malaysia) (New Zealand)	Choong Tan Fook; Chris Blair

England
1
Kuala Lumpur Badminton Stadium
15 September

Malaysia
4

			1	2	3
1	(England) (Malaysia)	Darren Hall; Yong Hock Kin
2	(England) (Malaysia)	Julian Robertson / Nathan Robertson; Choong Tan Fook / Lee Wan Wah
3	(England) (Malaysia)	Mark Constable; Wong Choong Hann
4	(England) (Malaysia)	Simon Archer / Chris Hunt; Cheah Soon Kit / Yap Kim Hock
5	(England) (Malaysia)	Peter Knowles; Choong Tan Fook

=== Women's team ===
Pool A

Team	Pld	W	L	GW	GL	GD	PW	PL	PD
Malaysia	3	3	0	28	5	+23			
New Zealand	3	2	1	25	8	+17			
Mauritius	3	1	2	10	21	-11			
Trinidad and Tobago	3	0	3	1	30	-29			

Qualified for the final round

Mauritius
0
Kuala Lumpur Badminton Stadium
9 September

Malaysia
5

			1	2	3
1	(Mauritius) (Malaysia)	Vandanah Seesurun; Woon Sze Mei
2	(Mauritius) (Malaysia)	Amrita Sawaram; Ng Mee Fen
3	(Mauritius) (Malaysia)	Anusha Dajee; Lim Pek Siah
4	(Mauritius) (Malaysia)	Marie Pierre / Vandanah Seesurun; Chor Hooi Yee / Lim Pek Siah
5	(Mauritius) (Malaysia)	Amrita Sawaram / Anusha Dajee; Norhasikin Amin / Joanne Quay

Malaysia
5
Kuala Lumpur Badminton Stadium
10 September

Trinidad and Tobago
0

			1	2	3
1	(Malaysia) (Trinidad and Tobago)	Woon Sze Mei; Sabrina Cassie
2	(Malaysia) (Trinidad and Tobago)	Law Pei Pei; Zeudi Mack
3	(Malaysia) (Trinidad and Tobago)	Ng Mee Fen; Jenelle Cudjoe
4	(Malaysia) (Trinidad and Tobago)	Chor Hooi Yee / Lim Pek Siah; Sabrina Cassie / Zeudi Mack
5	(Malaysia) (Trinidad and Tobago)	Norhasikin Amin / Joanne Quay; Beverly Tang / Jenelle Cudjoe

New Zealand
2
Kuala Lumpur Badminton Stadium
12 September

Malaysia
3

			1	2	3
1	(New Zealand) (Malaysia)	Li Feng; Woon Sze Mei	11; 4	6; 11	11; 4
2	(New Zealand) (Malaysia)	Rhona Robertson; Law Pei Pei	11; 6	4; 11	5; 11
3	(New Zealand) (Malaysia)	Amanda Carter; Lim Pek Siah	6; 11	1; 11
4	(New Zealand) (Malaysia)	Rhona Robertson / Tammy Jenkins; Chor Hooi Yee / Lim Pek Siah	5; 15	8; 15
5	(New Zealand) (Malaysia)	Nicole Gordon / Sheree Jefferson; Joanne Quay / Law Pei Pei	17; 14	7; 15	15; 6

Final round

Rank	Team	Pld	W	L	GW	GL	GD	PW	PL	PD
1st place, gold medalist(s)	England	2	1	1	17	6	+11			
2nd place, silver medalist(s)	Malaysia	2	2	0	17	5	+12			
3rd place, bronze medalist(s)	India	2	1	1	10	13	-3			
3rd place, bronze medalist(s)	Australia	2	0	2	1	20	-19			

Malaysia
5
Kuala Lumpur Badminton Stadium
14 September

India
0

			1	2	3
1	(Malaysia) (India)	Woon Sze Mei; Aparna Popat
2	(Malaysia) (India)	Chor Hooi Yee / Lim Pek Siah; Manjusha Kanwar / Archana Deodhar
3	(Malaysia) (India)	Law Pei Pei; Neelima Choudary
4	(Malaysia) (India)	Norhasikin Amin / Joanne Quay; Madhumita Bisht / P. V. V. Lakshmi
5	(Malaysia) (India)	Ng Mee Fen; Manjusha Kanwar

Australia
0
Kuala Lumpur Badminton Stadium
15 September

Malaysia
5

			1	2	3
1	(Australia) (Malaysia)	Michaela Smith; Woon Sze Mei
2	(Australia) (Malaysia)	Kellie Lucas; Law Pei Pei
3	(Australia) (Malaysia)	Rhonda Cator / Amanda Hardy; Chor Hooi Yee / Lim Pek Siah
4	(Australia) (Malaysia)	Rayoni Head; Ng Mee Fen
5	(Australia) (Malaysia)	Kellie Lucas / Sarah Hicks; Norhasikin Amin / Joanne Quay

== Boxing ==
Men

Athlete	Event	Round of 32	Round of 16	Quarterfinals	Semifinals	Final	
Athlete	Event	Opposition Result	Opposition Result	Opposition Result	Opposition Result	Opposition Result	Rank
Sapok Biki	Light flyweight (48 kg)	—N/a	Bye	Kennedy Kanyata (ZAM); W 23–6	Gary Jones (ENG); W 15–11	Gold medal match Moses Kinyua (KEN); W 19–13	1st place, gold medalist(s)
Rakib Ahmad	Flyweight (51 kg)	Roman Dlamini (SWZ); W RSC	David Erle Wiltshire (AUS); W 15–5	Richard Sunee (MRI); L 14–14 countback	did not advance		
Adnan Yusoh	Bantamweight (54 kg)	Bye		Silence Mabuza (RSA); W 16–14	Michael Yomba (TAN); L 15–16	Did not advance	3rd place, bronze medalist(s)
Thomas Benny Vivian	Featherweight (57 kg)	Bye	Marty O'Donnel (CAN); L 6–11	did not advance			
Muruguthevan Balakrishnan	Lightweight (60 kg)	Bye	Bikkie Malaolo (BOT); W 14–7	Andrew McLean (ENG); L 14–15	did not advance		
Andrew Kanis	Light welterweight (63.5 kg)	Nigel Wright (ENG); L 5–15	did not advance				
Samsudin Maidin	Welterweight (67 kg)	Bye	Thebe Setlalekgosi (BOT); L 6–10	did not advance			

== Cricket ==
Malaysia named the below squad for the tournament.

Roster

- Ramesh Menon (c)
- Chew Pok Cheong
- Siswanto Haidi
- Rakesh Madhavan
- Marimuthu Muniandy
- Jeevandran Nair
- Suresh Navaratnam
- Venu Ramadass
- Shankar Retinam (wk)
- Rohan Selvaratnam
- Rohan Suppiah
- David Thalalla
- Santhara Vello
- Matthew William

Summary

Team	Event	Group stage				Semifinal	Final / BM	
Team	Event	Opposition Result	Opposition Result	Opposition Result	Rank	Opposition Result	Opposition Result	Rank
Malaysia men	Men's tournament	Sri Lanka; L by 7 wickets	Zimbabwe; L by 221 runs	Jamaica; L by 6 wickets	4	did not advance		16

Group stage

Group A
Pos	Team	Pld	W	L	T	NR	Pts	NRR
1	Sri Lanka	3	3	0	0	0	6	1.581
2	Zimbabwe	3	2	1	0	0	4	1.887
3	Jamaica	3	1	2	0	0	2	−0.122
4	Malaysia	3	0	3	0	0	0	−3.736

Source: ESPNcricinfo

9 September 1998
10:00
Scorecard

Malaysia; 109 (47.4 overs)	v	Sri Lanka; 112/3 (19.4 overs)
Rakesh Madhavan 37; Thilan Samaraweera 3/17 (8.4 overs)		Avishka Gunawardene 43; Ramesh Menon 2/30 (5.4 overs)

Sri Lanka won by 7 wickets
Kelab Aman, Kuala Lumpur
Umpires: Beattie Arlow (NI) and V. K. Ramaswamy (Ind)

- Sri Lanka won the toss and elected to field.
- Suresh Navaratnam (Mas) made his List A debut.
- Marimuthu Muniandy (Mas) played his final List A match.
- Points: Sri Lanka 2, Malaysia 0.

12 September 1998
10:00
Scorecard

Zimbabwe; 309/9 (50 overs)	v	Malaysia; 88 (35.5 overs)
Andy Flower 70; Jeevandran Nair 3/53 (10 overs)		David Thalalla 17*; Mluleki Nkala 3/6 (4 overs)

Zimbabwe won by 221 runs
Kelab Aman, Kuala Lumpur
Umpires: Javed Akhtar (Pak) and Syed Mahabubullah (Ban)

- Malaysia won the toss and elected to field.
- Andy Flower (Zim) scored his 4,000th List A run.
- Santhara Vello and Jeevandran Nair (Mas) both played their final List A match.
- Points: Zimbabwe 2, Malaysia 0.
- Malaysia were eliminated as a result of this match.

14 September 1998
10:00
Scorecard

Malaysia; 83 (48.3 overs)	v	Jamaica; 87/4 (21 overs)
Ramesh Menon 19; Ryan Cunningham 4/13 (10 overs)		Tony Powell 20*; Suresh Navaratnam 2/23 (6 overs)

Jamaica won by 6 wickets
Victoria Institution, Kuala Lumpur
Umpires: Ismail Khan (Mas) and Saleem Badar (Pak)

- Malaysia won the toss and elected to bat.
- Carl Wright and Ryan Cunningham (Jam) both made their List A debut.
- Audley Sanson (Jam) played his only List A match.
- Rakesh Madhavan, David Thalalla, Ramesh Menon, Suresh Navaratnam, Matthew William, Kunjiraman Ramadas, Rohan Selvaratnam, Siswanto Haidi, Shankar Retinam, Rohan Suppiah, Chew Pok Cheong (Mas) and O'Neil Richards (Jam) all played their final List A match.
- Points: Jamaica 2, Malaysia 0.

== Cycling ==
=== Road ===
Athlete	Event	Time	Rank
Mohamed Mahazir Hamad	Men's road race	4:32:19	10
Murugayan Kumaresan	Men's road race	4:40:55	30
Musairi Musa	Men's road race	4:47:42	39
Nor Effandy Rosli	Men's road race	4:31:56	2nd place, silver medalist(s)
Shahrulneeza Razali	Men's road race	DNF	
Tsen Seong Hoong	Men's road race	4:47:42	40
Mohamed Mahazir Hamad	Men's road time trial	58:58	24
Shahrulneeza Razali	Men's road time trial	57:36	20
Nor Asrina Sulaiman	Women's road race	DNF	

=== Track ===
Sprint

Athlete	Event	Qualification		1/8 finals	1/4 finals	Final	
Athlete	Event	Time Speed (km/h)	Rank	Opposition Time	Opposition Time	Opposition Time	Rank
Rosman Alwi	Men's sprint	11.017; 65.400	12 Q	P Jacques (ENG); L	Bye	9th – 12th classification C Hoy (SCO); D Baron (CAN); C Grant (TRI); L	11
Halimah Mohd Janis	Women's sprint	12.422; 57.970	7 Q	—N/a	T Dubnicoff (CAN); L, L	5th – 8th classification F Ramage (NZL); M Szubrycht (ENG); T van Niekerk (RSA); L	6

Pursuit

Athlete	Event	Qualification		Semifinal		Final	
Athlete	Event	Time	Rank	Opposition Time	Rank	Opposition Time	Rank
Faizul Izuan Abdul Rahman; Harris Fadzillah Osman; Mohd Hardi Razali; Robert Lee	Men's team pursuit	4:38.297	6	did not advance			

Time trial

Athlete	Event	Time	Rank
Jamil Kadiron	Men's 1 km time trial	1:10.112	16
Mohd Hardi Razali	Men's 1 km time trial	1:14.398	21
Wong Ah Tiam	Men's 1 km time trial	1:13.145	18

Points race

Athlete	Event	Qualification		Final	
Athlete	Event	Points	Rank	Points	Rank
Murugayan Kumaresan	Men's points race	—N/a		1	12
Syed Mohd Hussaini Syed Mazlan	Men's points race	—N/a		0	21

== Diving ==
Men

Athlete	Event	Preliminaries		Final	
Athlete	Event	Points	Rank	Points	Rank
Chang Chong Chaw	1 m springboard	197.94	14 Q	165.96	15
Jonathan Bing Ngu	1 m springboard	274.14	10 Q	285.45	10
Syed Abdul Samad Abas	1 m springboard	216.60	12 Q	224.88	12
Jonathan Bing Ngu	3 m springboard	201.63	7 Q	517.47	11
Syed Abdul Samad Abas	3 m springboard	168.33	13 Q	464.16	12
Yeoh Ken Nee	3 m springboard	212.16	4 Q	535.17	8
Wong Tee Ming	10 m platform	168.00	7 Q	379.71	8
Yeoh Ken Nee	10 m platform	179.07	3 Q	537.75	4

Women

Athlete	Event	Preliminaries		Final	
Athlete	Event	Points	Rank	Points	Rank
Farah Begum Abdullah	1 m springboard	206.04	8 Q	212.97	8
Norazlina Sapieye	1 m springboard	127.44	12 Q	156.93	11
Farah Begum Abdullah	3 m springboard	181.71	12 Q	362.25	13
Wan Nur Safiah	3 m springboard	182.61	10 Q	390.42	11
Leong Mun Yee	10 m platform	157.59	6 Q	353.37	10
Wan Nur Safiah	10 m platform	143.73	9 Q	362.64	8

== Gymnastics ==
=== Artistic ===
Men

Athlete	Event								
Athlete	Event	F Rank	PH Rank	R Rank	V Rank	PB Rank	HB Rank	Total	Rank
Ahmad Akramin Othman	Qualification							25.300	
Heng Wah Jing	Qualification							30.200	
Loke Yik Siang	Qualification	Q	Q				Q	50.025	Q
Onn Kwang Tung	Qualification							48.000	Q
Zulkarnain Majid	Qualification					Q		38.700	
Ahmad Akramin Othman; Heng Wah Jing; Loke Yik Siang; Onn Kwang Tung; Zulkarnain Majid	Team all-around							147.075	5
Loke Yik Siang	Individual all-around		9.000; 4		9.000; 10			49.475	10
Onn Kwang Tung	Individual all-around		8.400; 9		8.450; 22			47.600	19
Loke Yik Siang	Floor	8.475; 6	—N/a					8.475	6
Loke Yik Siang	Pommel horse	—N/a	8.425; 7	—N/a				8.425	7
Zulkarnain Majid	Parallel bars	—N/a				8.375; 6	—N/a	8.375	6
Loke Yik Siang	Horizontal bar	—N/a					8.375; 6	8.375	6

Women

Athlete	Event						
Athlete	Event	F Rank	V Rank	UB Rank	BB Rank	Total	Rank
Au Li Yen	Qualification	8.837; 15 Q	9.124; 5 Q	7.975; 28	8.862; 1 Q	34.798	2 Q
Chang Siew Ting	Qualification	8.037; 31	8.468; 23	8.587; 15	7.375; 13	32.467	10
Ernadia Os'hara Omar	Qualification	8.250; 30	8.318; 29	8.212; 21	8.487; 4	33.267	6 Q
Kavita Kula	Qualification	—N/a		7.662; 31	—N/a	7.662	32
Lim Wai Chee	Qualification	8.850; 14	7.912; 35	—N/a	7.887; 9	24.649	20
Au Li Yen; Chang Siew Ting; Ernadia Os'hara Omar; Kavita Kula; Lim Wai Chee	Team all-around	25.937	25.910	24.774	25.236	101.857	7
Au Li Yen	Individual all-around	8.137; 19	8.668; 11	8.487; 13	8.160; 19	33.452	17
Ernadia Os'hara Omar	Individual all-around	7.925; 23	8.543; 15	7.712; 24	7.837; 20	32.017	22
Au Li Yen	Floor	8.050; 6	—N/a			8.050	6
Au Li Yen	Vault	—N/a	9.056; 5	—N/a		9.056	5
Au Li Yen	Balance beam	—N/a			8.662; 6	8.662	6

=== Rhythmic ===
Athlete	Event						
Athlete	Event	Rope Rank	Hoop Rank	Clubs Rank	Ribbon Rank	Total	Rank
Carolyn Au Yong	Qualification	9.262; 4 Q	—N/a	9.275; 8 Q	9.112; 6 Q	27.849	4 Q
El Regina Tajudin	Qualification	9.062; 9	9.350; 4 Q	—N/a	8.900; 10	27.312	10
Sarina Sundara Rajah	Qualification	—N/a		8.787; 14	—N/a	8.787	
Thye Chee Kiat	Qualification	9.475; 1 Q	9.475; 2 Q	9.600; 2 Q	9.200; 5 Q	28.450	2 Q
Carolyn Au Yong; El Regina Tajudin; Sarina Sundara Rajah; Thye Chee Kiat	Team all-around					93.023	1st place, gold medalist(s)
Carolyn Au Yong	Individual all-around	9.058; 7	9.287; 6	9.316; 5	8.933; 9	36.594	6
Thye Chee Kiat	Individual all-around	9.116; 5	9.366; 4	9.391; 3	9.366; 4	37.239	4
Carolyn Au Yong	Individual rope	9.349; 6	—N/a			9.349	6
Thye Chee Kiat	Individual rope	9.466; 3	—N/a			9.466	3rd place, bronze medalist(s)
El Regina Tajudin	Individual hoop	—N/a	9.366; 6	—N/a		9.366	6
Thye Chee Kiat	Individual hoop	—N/a	9.524; 2	—N/a		9.524	2nd place, silver medalist(s)
Carolyn Au Yong	Individual clubs	—N/a		9.283; 5	—N/a	9.283	5
Thye Chee Kiat	Individual clubs	—N/a		9.237; 6	—N/a	9.237	6
Carolyn Au Yong	Individual ribbon	—N/a			9.391; 3	9.391	3rd place, bronze medalist(s)
Thye Chee Kiat	Individual ribbon	—N/a			8.987; 7	8.987	7

== Hockey ==
=== Men's tournament ===
Pool B

	Team	Points	G	W	D	L	GF	GA	Diff
1.	Malaysia	8	4	2	2	0	9	4	+5
2.	England	8	4	2	2	0	9	6	+3
3.	Canada	5	4	1	2	1	11	6	+5
4.	Pakistan	5	4	1	2	1	11	11	0
5.	Kenya	0	4	0	0	4	5	18	–13

Qualified for the semifinals

10 September 1998
19:35

Kenya	0 – 4	Malaysia

13 September 1998
20:05

Pakistan	1 – 1	Malaysia

15 September 1998
18:05

Malaysia	2 – 2	England

17 September 1998
16:05

Canada	1 – 2	Malaysia

Semifinal

19 September 1998
20:35

Malaysia	1 – 0 (a.e.t.)	India

Gold medal match

20 September 1998
20:35

Australia	4 – 0	Malaysia

Ranked 2nd in final standings

=== Women's tournament ===
Pool A

	Team	Points	G	W	D	L	GF	GA	Diff
1.	Australia	15	5	5	0	0	41	0	+41
2.	India	10	5	3	1	1	19	8	+11
3.	Scotland	10	5	3	1	1	11	11	0
4.	Malaysia	6	5	2	0	3	11	21	−10
5.	Trinidad and Tobago	3	5	1	0	4	5	23	−18
6.	Jamaica	0	5	0	0	5	2	26	−24

Qualified for the semifinals

10 September 1998
16:05

Trinidad	1 – 6	Malaysia

12 September 1998
19:35

Australia	11 – 0	Malaysia

14 September 1998
16:05

India	6 – 1	Malaysia

15 September 1998
20:35

Scotland	2 – 1	Malaysia

17 September 1998
18:05

Jamaica	1 – 3	Malaysia

Ranked 7th in final standings

== Lawn bowls ==
Men

Athlete	Event	Group Stage		Final	
Athlete	Event	Opposition Score	Rank	Opposition Score	Rank
Syed Mohamad Syed Akil	Singles	C Richardson (BOT); W 25–22; R J Brassey (NZL); L 18–25; W Wood (SCO); W 25–22; Alexander Kayesa (ZAM); W 25–23; J Price (WAL); W 25–15; P H Matrais (BRU); W 25–15; D Calitz (NAM); L 14–25; K Turton (NFI); W 25–20; G Baker (RSA) ??? K Jones (CAN) ???		did not advance	
Mohamed Aziz Maswadi; Mohamed Tazman Tahir	Pairs	Samoa; W 27–18; Namibia; W 29–10; Zambia ??? Canada; W 33–9; Papua New Guinea; W 18–16	2	Did not advance	3rd place, bronze medalist(s)
Mohamed Afendy Tan Abdullah; Jozaini Johari; Nurdin Sabli; Sazeli Sani	Fours	Canada; T 21–21; Wales; L 18–21; Norfolk Island; W 18–15; Brunei; W 27–13		did not advance	

Women

Athlete	Event	Group Stage		Final	
Athlete	Event	Opposition Score	Rank	Opposition Score	Rank
Saedah Abdul Rahim	Singles	F Anderson (BOT); W 25–14; R Dunn (AUS); L 19–25; J Wason (WAL); W 25–13; Bridget Ainsworth (NAM); W 25–19; M Like (ZAM); W 25–13; T Harry (COK); W 25–11; L Letoa (SAM); W 25–9; Jean Baker (ENG) ???	1 Q	Gold medal match L Hartwell (RSA); L 14–25	2nd place, silver medalist(s)
Siti Hawa Ali; Bah Chu Mei	Pairs	Fiji; W 18–17; Norfolk Island; W 23–16; New Zealand; W 24–22; Scotland; L 14–24; Kenya; W 25–14; Wales; L 14–17; Zambia; L 19–20; Northern Ireland; L 14–26		did not advance	
Haslah Hassan; Nor Azwa Mohd Di; Nor Hashimah Ismail; Siti Zalina Ahmad	Fours	Wales; L 13–19; New Zealand; W 20–16; South Africa; W 21–19; Papua New Guinea; L 16–19; Swaziland; W 18–16; Cook Islands; W 28-13	2	Did not advance	3rd place, bronze medalist(s)

== Netball ==
Squad

- Hanizah Hashim
- Tang Mee Huong
- Roslina Ismail
- Rohaida Ismail
- Puah Pei Ling
- Kuah Seow Peng
- Wan Norafzan Wan Mahadi
- Siti Afizah Mohamad Noh
- Aidah Ariffin Nor
- Wong Mei Yee
- Seow Li Yoong

Summary

Malaysia finished 11th in the netball at the 1998 Commonwealth Games. In the group stages, they lost all five of their matches.

Group A

14 September 1998	Malaysia	17–85	Australia

15 September 1998	Malaysia	30–58	Barbados

16 September 1998	Malaysia	26–83	Jamaica

17 September 1998	Malaysia	19–63	England

18 September 1998	Malaysia	28–58	Canada

Pos	Team	P	W	D	L	GF	GA	GD	Pts
1	Australia	5	5	0	0	377	145	+232	10
2	England	5	4	0	1	257	197	+60	8
3	Jamaica	5	3	0	2	317	223	-94	6
4	Barbados	5	2	0	3	219	267	-48	4
5	Canada	5	1	0	4	195	306	-111	2
6	Malaysia	5	0	0	5	120	347	-227	0

Qualified for Semi-final 1
Qualified for Semi-final 2

== Rugby sevens ==
=== Men's tournament ===
Malaysia has qualified a rugby sevens team.

Pool D

Team	Pld	W	D	L	PF	PA	PD	Pts
New Zealand	2	2	0	0	133	0	+133	6
Malaysia	2	1	0	1	35	79	-44	3
Sri Lanka	2	0	0	1	26	115	-89	0

12 September 1998
19:00

Sri Lanka	26–35	Malaysia

Petaling Jaya Stadium, Petaling Jaya

12 September 1998
21:00

New Zealand	53–0	Malaysia

Petaling Jaya Stadium, Petaling Jaya

Plate
Pool B

Team	Pld	W	D	L	PF	PA	PD	Pts
Fiji	2	2	0	0	134	5	+129	6
Malaysia	2	1	0	1	24	68	-44	3
Kenya	2	0	0	1	5	90	-85	0

13 September 1998

Fiji	63–5	Malaysia

Petaling Jaya Stadium, Petaling Jaya

13 September 1998

Malaysia	19–5	Kenya

Petaling Jaya Stadium, Petaling Jaya

== Shooting ==
Men
Pistol/Small bore

Athlete	Event	Qualification		Final	
Athlete	Event	Points	Rank	Points	Rank
Marzuki Man	10 m air pistol individual	566	8 Q	655.0	8
Mohd Hashim Desa	10 m air pistol individual	558	23	did not advance	
Hasli Izwan Amir Hasan	25 m rapid fire pistol individual	572	5 Q	668	4
Shah Indrawan	25 m rapid fire pistol individual	562	12	did not advance	
Hasli Izwan Amir Hasan; Shah Indrawan	25 m rapid fire pistol pairs	—N/a		1099	7
Marzuki Man	25 m centre fire pistol individual	—N/a		559	19
Mohd Hashim Desa	25 m centre fire pistol individual	—N/a		562	16
Marzuki Man; Mohd Hashim Desa	25 m centre fire pistol pairs	—N/a		1135	5
Mohd Hashim Desa	50 m free pistol individual	539	9	did not advance	
Sidex Ali	50 m free pistol individual	519	19	did not advance	
Mohd Hashim Desa; Sidex Ali	50 m free pistol pairs	—N/a		1043	11
Abdul Mutalib Abdul Razak	10 m air rifle individual	583	3 Q	683.2	4
Mohammed Emran Zakaria	10 m air rifle individual	583	4 Q	687.2	2nd place, silver medalist(s)
Abdul Mutalib Abdul Razak; Mohammed Emran Zakaria	10 m air rifle pairs	—N/a		1167	2nd place, silver medalist(s)
Jasni Shaari	50 m rifle prone individual	574	32	did not advance	
Mohd Sabki Mohd Din	50 m rifle prone individual	585	18	did not advance	
Jasni Shaari; Mohd Sabki Mohd Din	50 m rifle prone pairs	—N/a		1162	10
Jasni Shaari	50 m rifle three positions individual	1110	16	did not advance	
Mohd Sabki Mohd Din	50 m rifle three positions individual	1130	8 Q	1224.5	6
Jasni Shaari; Mohd Sabki Mohd Din	50 m rifle three positions pairs	—N/a		2241	6

Shotgun

Athlete	Event	Qualification		Final	
Athlete	Event	Points	Rank	Points	Rank
Chen Seong Fook	Trap individual	73	38	did not advance	
Leong Wei Heng	Trap individual	105	26	did not advance	
Chen Seong Fook; Leong Wei Heng	Trap pairs	—N/a		143	18
Goh Kek Chuan	Skeet individual	108	22	did not advance	
Ricky Teh Chee Fei	Skeet individual	105	27	did not advance	
Goh Kek Chuan; Ricky Teh Chee Fei	Skeet pairs	—N/a		173	10

Full bore

Athlete	Event	Qualification		Final	
Athlete	Event	Total score	Rank	Total score	Rank
Zainal Abidin Md Zain	Full bore rifle Queen's prize open individual	289	21 Q	400	2nd place, silver medalist(s)
Zulkeflee Hamsan	Full bore rifle Queen's prize open individual	292	8 Q	394	14
Zainal Abidin Md Zain; Zulkeflee Hamsan	Full bore rifle Queen's prize open pairs	—N/a		295	6

Women
Pistol/Small bore

Athlete	Event	Qualification		Final	
Athlete	Event	Points	Rank	Points	Rank
Kamisah Abdul Jalal	10 m air pistol individual	369	10	did not advance	
Suriani Othman	10 m air pistol individual	363	17	did not advance	
Kamisah Abdul Jalal; Suriani Othman	10 m air pistol pairs	—N/a		743	3rd place, bronze medalist(s)
Bibiana Ng Pei Chin	25 m sport pistol individual	286	14 Q	672.1	2nd place, silver medalist(s)
Norsita Mahmud	25 m sport pistol individual	322	13	did not advance	
Bibiana Ng Pei Chin; Norsita Mahmud	25 m sport pistol pairs	—N/a		1116	3rd place, bronze medalist(s)
Noriha Abdul Rani	10 m air rifle individual	390	5 Q	384	10
Nurul Huda Baharin	10 m air rifle individual	393	1 Q	494.8 GR	1st place, gold medalist(s)
Roslina Bakar	10 m air rifle individual	–	DNF	did not advance	
Nurul Huda Baharin; Roslina Bakar	10 m air rifle pairs	—N/a		761	6
Roslina Bakar	50 m rifle prone individual	–	DNF	did not advance	
Sarihati Awang Bakar	50 m rifle prone individual	577	15	did not advance	
Roslina Bakar; Sarihati Awang Bakar	50 m rifle prone pairs	—N/a		1158	10
Roslina Bakar	50 m rifle three positions individual	574 GR	1 Q	666.3	3rd place, bronze medalist(s)
Sarihati Awang Bakar	50 m rifle three positions individual	554	11	did not advance	
Roslina Bakar; Sarihati Awang Bakar	50 m rifle three positions pairs	—N/a		1107	6

== Squash ==
Individual

Athlete	Event	Round of 64	Round of 32	Round of 16	Quarterfinals	Semifinals	Final	Rank
Athlete	Event	Opposition Score	Opposition Score	Opposition Score	Opposition Score	Opposition Score	Opposition Score	Rank
Kenneth Low (15)	Men's singles	L Monnapula (LES); W 9–0, 9–2, 9–2	G Whittaker (RSA); W 9–3, 9–3, 2–9, 5–9, 9–5	A Gough (WAL); L 6–9, 1–9, 9–3, 7–9	did not advance			
Michael Soo	Men's singles	P de Vertuil (TRI); W 9–2, 9–2, 9–3	S Parke (ENG); L 0–9, 4–9, 9–4, 0–9	did not advance				
Mohd Azlan Iskandar	Men's singles	C Sonson (LCA); W 9–4, 9–2, 9–0	C Wapnick (RSA); L 0–9, 0–9, 1–9	did not advance				
Ong Beng Hee	Men's singles	T Rahming (BAH); W 9–1, 9–4, 9–2	G Ryding (CAN); L 9–10, 2–9, 1–9	did not advance				
Leong Siu Lynn	Women's singles	—N/a	M Perry (NIR); W 9–0, 5–9, 7–9, 9–5, 9–5	C Owens (AUS); L 2–9, 2–9, 4–9	did not advance			
Nicol David	Women's singles	—N/a	M Jans (CAN); W 9–3, 9–2, 5–9, 9–5	L Charman (ENG); L 6–9, 6–9, 0–9	did not advance			
Sandra Wu	Women's singles	—N/a	S MacFie (SCO); L 6–9, 1–9, 2–9	did not advance				
Sharon Wee	Women's singles	—N/a	N Grainger (RSA); L 0–9, 4–9, 0–9	did not advance				

Doubles

Athletes	Event	Group Stage					Quarterfinal	Semifinal	Final	Rank
Athletes	Event	Opposition Score	Opposition Score	Opposition Score	Opposition Score	Rank	Opposition Score	Opposition Score	Opposition Score	Rank
Kenneth Low; Michael Soo	Men's doubles	C Wapnick & G Whittaker (RSA); W 7–15, 15–10, 15–9	R Lingashi & S Mazambo (ZAM); W W/O	M Moksogi & C Ntshebe (BOT); W 15–7, 15–10	—N/a	1 Q	C Walker & M Cairns (ENG); L 7–15, 10–15	did not advance		
Ong Beng Hee; Mohd Azlan Iskandar	Men's doubles	A Gough & D Evans (WAL); L 12–15, 9–15	M Zaman & M H Khan (PAK); W 15–11, 17–14	T Rahming & S Morris (BAH); W 15–6, 15–8	—N/a	2	did not advance			
Leong Siu Lynn; Nicol David	Women's doubles	S Wright & C Jackman (ENG); W 8–15, 3–15	Mah L L & M Moy (SIN); W 13–15, 15–11, 15–12	—N/a		2 Q	S Fitz-Gerald & C Owens (AUS); L 9–15, 10–15	did not advance		
Kuan Choy Lin; Sharon Wee	Women's doubles	L Charman & J Martin (ENG); L 7–15, 9–15	R Cooper & Rachael Grinham (AUS); L 3–15, 10–15	V Chishimba & M Nolde (ZAM); W 15–7, 15–12	—N/a	3	did not advance			
Yap Kok Four; Sandra Wu	Mixed doubles	S Parke & S Horner (ENG); L 15–12, 12–15, 10–15	G Wilson & S Cook (NZL); L 10–15, 8–15	D Hunter & N Guy (NZL); L 13–15, 15–6, 10–15	G Tippings & S Johnson (WAL); W 15–7, 15–9	4	did not advance			

== Swimming ==
Men

Athlete	Event	Heat		Semifinal		Final	
Athlete	Event	Time	Rank	Time	Rank	Time	Rank
Dieung Manggang	400 m freestyle	4:01.22	10	—N/a		did not advance	
Alex Lim	100 m backstroke	57.29	10	—N/a		did not advance	
Alex Lim	200 m backstroke		Q	—N/a		2:02.52	7
Elvin Chia	100 m breaststroke		Q	—N/a		1:03.42	7
Elvin Chia	200 m breaststroke		Q	—N/a		2:18.77	8
Alex Lim	100 m butterfly	56.30	8 Q	56.26	13	did not advance	
Anthony Ang	100 m butterfly		Q	55.90	12	did not advance	
Anthony Ang	200 m butterfly	2:03.07	11	—N/a		did not advance	
Wan Azlan Abdullah	200 m individual medley	2:10.99	15 Q	2:09.88	15	did not advance	
Wan Azlan Abdullah	400 m individual medley	4:34.74	10 Q	4:37.54	10	did not advance	
Alex Lim; Allen Ong; Anthony Ang; Elvin Chia	4 × 100 m freestyle relay	—N/a				3:32.27	6
Alex Lim; Dieung Manggang; Elvin Chia; Wan Azlan Abdullah	4 × 200 m freestyle relay	—N/a				7:46.40	5
Alex Lim; Dieung Manggang; Elvin Chia; Wan Azlan Abdullah	4 × 100 m medley relay	3:50.47	6 Q	—N/a		3:48.26	5

Women

Athlete	Event	Heat		Semifinal		Final	
Athlete	Event	Time	Rank	Time	Rank	Time	Rank
Ho Hsu Ee	50 m freestyle	27.81	23	did not advance			
Teo Mui Nyee	200 m freestyle	2:09.20	11 Q	2:08.35	14	did not advance	
Teo Mui Nyee	400 m freestyle	4:28.88	10	—N/a		did not advance	
Chew Lee San	200 m backstroke	2:32.75	19	—N/a		did not advance	
Tay Li Leng	100 m breaststroke	1:13.15	9	—N/a		did not advance	
Tay Li Leng	200 m breaststroke	2:42.19	12 Q	2:41.85	13	did not advance	
Sia Wai Yen	200 m butterfly	2:22.25	12 Q	2:21.48	14	did not advance	
Sia Wai Yen	200 m individual medley	2:23.63	12	—N/a		did not advance	
Sia Wai Yen	400 m individual medley	4:57.24	9	—N/a		did not advance	
Chew Lee San; Ho Hsu Ee; Sia Wai Yen; Teo Mui Nyee	4 × 100 m freestyle relay	—N/a				4:07.47	8
Chew Lee San; Ho Hsu Ee; Sia Wai Yen; Teo Mui Nyee	4 × 200 m freestyle relay	—N/a				8:58.14	5
Chew Lee San; Ho Hsu Ee; Tay Li Leng; Teo Mui Nyee	4 × 100 m medley relay	—N/a				4:29.87	7

== Synchronized swimming ==
Athlete	Event	Technical routine		Free routine		Total points	Rank
Athlete	Event	Score	Rank	Score	Rank	Total points	Rank
Jacquelyn Chan	Women's solo	28.233	5	53.994	4	82.227	5
Jacquelyn Chan; Hazrina Sofian	Women's duet					81.277	4

== Ten-pin bowling ==
Athlete	Event	Total points	Rank
Ben Heng	Men's singles	5806	4
Kenny Ang	Men's singles	6046	1st place, gold medalist(s)
Lai Kin Ngoh	Women's singles	5920	3rd place, bronze medalist(s)
Shalin Zulkifli	Women's singles	5704	6
Ben Heng; Kenny Ang	Men's doubles	3552	1st place, gold medalist(s)
Lai Kin Ngoh; Shalin Zulkifli	Women's doubles	3548	2nd place, silver medalist(s)
Kenny Ang; Lai Kin Ngoh	Mixed doubles	3482	4
Ben Heng; Shalin Zulkifli	Mixed doubles	3198	13

== Weightlifting ==
Men

Athlete	Event	Snatch		Clean & Jerk		Total	Rank
Athlete	Event	Result	Rank	Result	Rank	Total	Rank
Matin Guntali	56 kg	105	3rd place, bronze medalist(s)	135	3rd place, bronze medalist(s)	240	3rd place, bronze medalist(s)
Muhamad Hidayat Hamidon	69 kg	127.5		167.5	1st place, gold medalist(s)	295	2nd place, silver medalist(s)
Edmund Yeo Thien Chuan	85 kg	132.5	7	165	7	297.5	7
Che Mohd Azrul Che Mat	105 kg	122.5	11	160	11	282.5	10
