= Malaysia at the 1994 Commonwealth Games =

- CGF code: MAS
- CGA: Olympic Council of Malaysia
- Website: olympic.org.my

in Victoria, British Columbia, Canada
- Competitors: 48 in 8 sports
- Medals Ranked 14th: Gold 2 Silver 3 Bronze 2 Total 7

Commonwealth Games appearances (overview)
- 1950; 1954; 1958; 1962; 1966; 1970; 1974; 1978; 1982; 1986; 1990; 1994; 1998; 2002; 2006; 2010; 2014; 2018; 2022; 2026; 2030

Other related appearances
- British North Borneo (1958, 1962); Sarawak (1958, 1962)

Malaysia competed in the 1994 Commonwealth Games held in Victoria, British Columbia, Canada from 18 to 28 August 1994.

== Medal summary ==
=== Medals by sport ===
Sport	Gold	Silver	Bronze	Total	Rank
Badminton	2	2	2	6	2
Weightlifting	0	1	0	1	8
Total	2	3	2	7	14

=== Medallists ===
Medal	Name	Sport	Event
Gold	Rashid Sidek	Badminton	Men's singles
Gold	Cheah Soon Kit; Soo Beng Kiang	Badminton	Men's doubles
Silver	Ong Ewe Hock	Badminton	Men's singles
Silver	Cheah Soon Kit; Kuak Seok Choon; Lee Wai Leng; Leong Yeng Cheng; Ong Ewe Hock; Rashid Sidek; Soo Beng Kiang; Tan Kim Her; Tan Lee Wai; Zamaliah Sidek	Badminton	Mixed team
Silver	Matin Guntali	Weightlifting	Men's flyweight clean and jerk
Bronze	Ong Ewe Hock; Tan Kim Her	Badminton	Men's doubles
Bronze	Lee Wai Leng; Tan Lee Wai	Badminton	Women's doubles

== Athletics ==
Men
Track events

Athlete	Event	Heat		Quarterfinal		Semifinal		Final	
Athlete	Event	Time	Rank	Time	Rank	Time	Rank	Time	Rank
Azmi Ibrahim	100 m	10.63	6	did not advance					
Azmi Ibrahim	200 m	22.16	4	did not advance					
Munusamy Ramachandran	5000 m	14:46.71	8	—N/a				did not advance	
Munusamy Ramachandran	10,000 m	—N/a						29:30.19	7
Nur Herman Majid	110 m hurdles	did not finish		—N/a				did not advance	

Field events

Athlete	Event	Qualification		Final	
Athlete	Event	Distance	Rank	Distance	Rank
Loo Kum Zee	High jump		Q	2.15	10
Lou Cwee Peng	High jump	2.10	16	did not advance	
Mohamed Zaki Sadri	Long jump	7.46	17	did not advance	
Mohamed Zaki Sadri	Triple jump	did not start		did not advance	

Women
Track events

Athlete	Event	Heat		Quarterfinal		Semifinal		Final	
Athlete	Event	Time	Rank	Time	Rank	Time	Rank	Time	Rank
Shanti Govindasamy	100 m	11.67	4	—N/a		did not advance			
Shanti Govindasamy	200 m	23.75	5	—N/a		did not advance			
Jayanthi Palaniappan	1500 m	—N/a						4:24.31	10
Jayanthi Palaniappan	3000 m	—N/a						did not start	
Jayanthi Palaniappan	10,000 m	—N/a						34:23.71	12

Key

- Note–Ranks given for track events are within the athlete's heat only
- Q = Qualified for the next round
- q = Qualified for the next round as a fastest loser or, in field events, by position without achieving the qualifying target
- NR = National record
- N/A = Round not applicable for the event
- Bye = Athlete not required to compete in round

== Badminton ==
Athlete	Event	Round of 64	Round of 32	Round of 16	Quarterfinal	Semifinal	Final	Rank
Athlete	Event	Opposition Score	Opposition Score	Opposition Score	Opposition Score	Opposition Score	Opposition Score	Rank
Ong Ewe Hock	Men's singles	W	W	W	W	W	Gold medal match Rashid Sidek (MAS); L	2nd place, silver medalist(s)
Rashid Sidek	Men's singles	W	W	W	W	W	Gold medal match Ong Ewe Hock (MAS); W	1st place, gold medalist(s)
Cheah Soon Kit; Soo Beng Kiang	Men's doubles	—N/a	W	W	W	W	Gold medal match Simon Archer; Chris Hunt (ENG); L	1st place, gold medalist(s)
Ong Ewe Hock; Tan Kim Her	Men's doubles	—N/a	W	W	W	L	Did not advance	3rd place, bronze medalist(s)
Kuak Sieok Choon	Women's singles	W	L	did not advance				
Leong Yeng Cheng	Women's singles	W	W	L	did not advance			
Kuak Sieok Choon; Zamaliah Sidek	Women's doubles	—N/a	W	L	did not advance			
Lee Wai Leng; Tan Lee Wai	Women's doubles	—N/a	W	W	W	L	Did not advance	3rd place, bronze medalist(s)
Cheah Soon Kit; Lee Wai Leng	Mixed doubles	W	W	W	L	did not advance		
Soo Beng Kiang; Zamaliah Sidek	Mixed doubles	W	W	W	L	did not advance		
Tan Kim Her; Tan Lee Wai	Mixed doubles	W	W	W	L	did not advance		
Cheah Soon Kit; Kuak Seok Choon; Lee Wai Leng; Leong Yeng Cheng; Ong Ewe Hock; Rashid Sidek; Soo Beng Kiang; Tan Kim Her; Tan Lee Wai; Zamaliah Sidek	Mixed team	—N/a		W	W	W	Gold medal match England; L	2nd place, silver medalist(s)

== Boxing ==
Men

Athlete	Event	Round of 32	Round of 16	Quarterfinal	Semifinal	Final	Rank
Athlete	Event	Opposition Score	Opposition Score	Opposition Score	Opposition Score	Opposition Score	Rank
Balkish Ahlal	Bantamweight	L	did not advance				
Ramli Yahya	Light welterweight	L	did not advance				

== Cycling ==
=== Road ===
Athlete	Event	Time	Rank
Murugayan Kumaresan	Men's road race	5:02:03	23
Nor Effandy Rosli	Men's road race	did not finish	
Shahrulneeza Razali	Men's road race	5:02:09	29
Tsen Seong Hoong	Men's road race	did not finish	

=== Track ===
Points race

Athlete	Event	Final	
Athlete	Event	Points	Rank
Mohamad Keton	Men's points race	–	DNF
Murugayan Kumaresan	Men's points race		16

Scratch race

Athlete	Event	Final	
Athlete	Event	Time	Rank
Mohamad Keton	Men's scratch race	–	DNF
Murugayan Kumaresan	Men's scratch race		9

== Gymnastics ==
=== Artistic ===
Women

Athlete	Event						
Athlete	Event	F Rank	V Rank	UB Rank	BB Rank	Total	Rank
Lim Wai Chi	Individual all-around					34.762	16

=== Rhythmic ===
Athlete	Event						
Athlete	Event	Rope Rank	Hoop Rank	Clubs Rank	Ribbon Rank	Total	Rank
Farah Zellinah Kemal	Individual all-around					29.500	13
Goh Siew Chuan	Individual all-around					29.400	14
Christina Loke; Farah Zellinah Kemal; Goh Siew Chuan	Team all-around					88.600	7

== Lawn bowls ==
Four bowlers represented for Malaysia in lawn bowls.

== Shooting ==
Men

Athlete	Event	Qualification		Final	
Athlete	Event	Points	Rank	Points	Rank
Ali Noor Raziff	10 m air pistol		Q	663.4	7
Mohd Hashim Desa	10 m air pistol	550	24	did not advance	
Ali Noor Raziff; Mohd Hashim Desa	10 m air pistol pairs	—N/a		1127	5
Ali Noor Raziff	50 m free pistol	536	12	did not advance	
Mohd Hashim Desa	50 m free pistol		Q	637.9	5
Ali Noor Raziff; Mohd Hashim Desa	50 m free pistol pairs	—N/a		1080	4
Hor Tuck Wah	Rapid fire pistol	548	18	did not advance	
Abdul Mutalib Abdul Razak	10 m air rifle	564	14	did not advance	
Jasni Shaari	50 m rifle prone	586	14	did not advance	
Mohd Sabki Mohd Din	50 m rifle prone	576	27	did not advance	
Jasni Shaari; Mohd Sabki Mohd Din	50 m rifle prone pairs	—N/a		1158	12
Chai Hee Hng	Trap	104	24	did not advance	
Lim Yack Tuck	Trap	107	20	did not advance	
Chai Hee Hng; Lim Yack Tuck	Trap pairs	—N/a		175	11
Kaw Fun Ying	Skeet	114	16	did not advance	
Lau Chee Yeung	Skeet	107	24	did not advance	
Kaw Fun Ying; Lau Chee Yeung	Skeet pairs	—N/a		176	9

Women

Athlete	Event	Qualification		Final	
Athlete	Event	Points	Rank	Points	Rank
Goi Gaik Khim	10 m air pistol		Q	456.5	8
Noriha Rani	10 m air rifle	381	9	did not advance	

== Weightlifting ==
Men

Athlete	Event	Snatch		Clean & jerk		Total	Rank
Athlete	Event	Result	Rank	Result	Rank	Total	Rank
Matin Guntali	54 kg	90.0	5	130.0	2nd place, silver medalist(s)	220.0	5
Rajunit Pangkat	54 kg	85.0	7	115.0	6	200.0	6
Abdul Rahman	59 kg	97.5	5	120.0	5	217.5	5
