= Malaya at the 1950 British Empire Games =

- Flag of Malaya
- CGF code: MAL
- CGA: Federation of Malaya Olympic Council
- Website: olympic.org.my

in Auckland, New Zealand
- Competitors: 6 in 2 sports
- Medals Ranked 7th: Gold 2 Silver 1 Bronze 1 Total 4

British Empire Games appearances
- 1950; 1954; 1958; 1962; 1966; 1970; 1974; 1978; 1982; 1986; 1990; 1994; 1998; 2002; 2006; 2010; 2014; 2018; 2022; 2026; 2030

Federation of Malaya competed for the first time in the 1950 British Empire Games held in Auckland, New Zealand from 4 to 11 February 1950. It won 2 gold, 1 silver and 1 bronze medal.

== Medal summary ==
=== Medals by sport ===
Sport	Gold	Silver	Bronze	Total	Rank
Weightlifting	2	1	1	4	1
Total	2	1	1	4	7

=== Medallists ===
Medal	Name	Sport	Event
Gold	Tho Fook Hung	Weightlifting	Men's 56 kg
Gold	Koh Eng Tong	Weightlifting	Men's 60 kg
Silver	Thong Saw Pak	Weightlifting	Men's 67.5 kg
Bronze	Tan Kim Bee	Weightlifting	Men's 82.5 kg

== Athletics ==
Men
Track events

Athlete	Event	Heat		Semifinal		Final	
Athlete	Event	Time	Rank	Time	Rank	Time	Rank
Lloyd O. Valberg	120 yards hurdles		4 Q		4	did not advance	
Ng Liang Chiang	440 yards hurdles		5	did not advance			

Field event

Athlete	Event	Final	
Athlete	Event	Distance	Rank
Lloyd O. Valberg	High jump	1.83	11

Key

- Note–Ranks given for track events are within the athlete's heat only
- Q = Qualified for the next round
- q = Qualified for the next round as a fastest loser or, in field events, by position without achieving the qualifying target
- NR = National record
- N/A = Round not applicable for the event
- Bye = Athlete not required to compete in round

== Weightlifting ==
Men

Athlete	Event	Military press		Snatch		Clean & jerk		Total	Rank
Athlete	Event	Result	Rank	Result	Rank	Result	Rank	Total	Rank
Tho Fook Hung	56 kg							655 lb	1st place, gold medalist(s)
Koh Eng Tong	60 kg							685 lb	1st place, gold medalist(s)
Thong Saw Pak	67.5 kg							735 lb	2nd place, silver medalist(s)
Tan Kim Bee	82.5 kg							765 lb	3rd place, bronze medalist(s)
