= Judo at the 2026 Commonwealth Games – Men's 81 kg =

Judo competition

Judo – Men's 81 kg at the 2026 Commonwealth Games
- Venue: SEC Centre, Glasgow
- Date: August 1 2026
- Competitors: 10 from 10 nations

Medalists
gold medal	Amir Daniel Abdul Majeed	Malaysia
silver medal	Timothy Meuwsen	South Africa
bronze medal	Keishin Ochi	Australia
bronze medal	Odysseas Georgakis	Cyprus

The Men's 81 kg judo competitions at the 2026 Commonwealth Games in Glasgow, Scotland took on August 1 at the SEC Centre. Nine judoka from nine nations will take part in this class.

== Seedings ==
The following judoka were seeded in advance of the draw:

Men's 81 kg
Seed	Judoka	Nation
1	Keishin Ochi	Australia
2	Timothy Meuwsen	South Africa
3	Odysseas Georgakis	Cyprus
4	Amir Daniel Abdul Majeed	Malaysia
5	Fernand Nkero	Gabon
6	Harsh Tokas	India
7	Peniamina Percival	Samoa
8	Andrew Mlugu	Tanzania

== Results ==
=== Gold medal path ===
Round of 16
Andrew Mlugu (TAN)	110
Jamison Dick (SEY)	010 (yellow card)
Peniamina Percival (SAM)	003
Adam Stevens (GIB)	000

Quarterfinals
Keishin Ochi (AUS)	100 (yellow card)
Andrew Mlugu (TAN)	000 (yellow card)
Amir Daniel (MAS)	001 (yellow card)
Fernand Nkero (GAB)	000 (yellow card)
Timothy Meuwsen (RSA)	100
Peniamina Percival (SAM)	000
Odysseas Georgakis (CYP)	001
Harsh Tokas (IND)	000

Semifinal
Keishin Ochi (AUS)	000 (yellow card)
Amir Daniel (MAS)	001
Timothy Meuwsen (RSA)	100
Odysseas Georgakis (CYP)	000

Gold medal final
Amir Daniel (MAS)	010
Timothy Meuwsen (RSA)	000

=== Repechage/bronze medal path ===
Competitors who were eliminated between the quarter finals and the final enter the repechage for a bronze medal.

Repechage
Andrew Mlugu (TAN)	000
Fernand Nkero (GAB)	002
Peniamina Percival (SAM)	000
Harsh Tokas (IND)	101

Bronze medal
Fernand Nkero (GAB)	000 (yellow card)
Odysseas Georgakis (CYP)	100 (yellow card)
Harsh Tokas (IND)	000
Keishin Ochi (AUS)	100 (yellow card)
