= Malaysia at the 2026 Commonwealth Games =

- Flag of Malaysia
- CG code: MAS
- CGA: Olympic Council of Malaysia
- Website: olympic.org.my

in Glasgow, Scotland 23 July 2026 – 2 August 2026
- Competitors: 59 in 8 sports
- Flag bearer: Abdul Latif Romly
- Baton bearer: Emma Firyana Saroji
- Medals Ranked 10th: Gold 8 Silver 3 Bronze 5 Total 16

Commonwealth Games appearances (overview)
- 1950; 1954; 1958; 1962; 1966; 1970; 1974; 1978; 1982; 1986; 1990; 1994; 1998; 2002; 2006; 2010; 2014; 2018; 2022; 2026; 2030

Other related appearances
- British North Borneo (1958, 1962); Sarawak (1958, 1962)

Malaysia competed at the 2026 Commonwealth Games in Glasgow, Scotland. This marked Malaysia's 18th participation at the games, after making its debut at the 1950 Commonwealth Games.

The King's Baton relay stopped in Malaysia in November 2025. The Malaysian team consisted of 59 athletes (41 men and 18 women) competing in eight sports. Para-athlete Abdul Latif Romly was the country's flagbearer during the opening ceremony. Meanwhile, bowls athlete Emma Firyana Saroji was the baton bearer during the opening ceremony.

Despite the exclusion of traditional gold mine sports notably badminton, Malaysia recorded its second-highest gold medal count for participation outside the home soil. The eight-gold medal haul was only behind the 2010 edition where the country won twelve. Five of the eight gold medals were contributed by weightlifting , which is also the country's best ever performance in the sport at a single Commonwealth Games.

== Competitors ==
The following is the list of number of competitors participating at the Games per sport/discipline.

Sport		Men	Women	Total
3x3 basketball (wheelchair)		8	0	8
Artistic gymnastics		3	3	6
Athletics	Athletics			
Athletics	Para-athletics	3	0	3
Bowls	Bowls	3	3	6
Bowls	Para-bowls	0	2	2
Judo		1	0	1
Swimming	Swimming	4	0	4
Swimming	Para-swimming	3	0	3
Track cycling	Para track cycling	2	2	4
Track cycling	Track cycling	3	2	5
Weightlifting	Para powerlifting	3	0	3
Weightlifting	Weightlifting	6	3	9
Total		41	18	59

== Medalists ==
The following competitors won medals at the games. In the by discipline sections below, medallists' names are bolded.

Medal	Name	Sport	Event	Date
Gold	Aniq Kasdan	Weightlifting	Men's 60 kg	26 July
Gold	Aznil Bidin	Weightlifting	Men's 65 kg	26 July
Gold	Erry Hidayat	Weightlifting	Men's 79 kg	27 July
Gold	Hafizuddin Roslin	Weightlifting	Men's 88 kg	28 July
Gold	Abdul Latif Romly	Para-athletics	Men's long jump T20	28 July
Gold	Mohamad Syahmi	Weightlifting	Men's 94 kg	29 July
Gold	Azizulhasni Awang	Track cycling	Men's keirin	31 July
Gold	Amir Daniel Abdul Majeed	Judo	Men's 81 kg	1 August
Silver	Syafiqa Haider; Aleena Nawawi	Bowls	Women's pairs	28 July
Silver	Izzat Dzulkeple	Bowls	Men's singles	28 July
Silver	Siti Aqilah Farhana	Weightlifting	Women's +86 kg	30 July
Bronze	Bonnie Bunyau Gustin	Para powerlifting	Men's lightweight	24 July
Bronze	Irene Jane Henry	Weightlifting	Women's 48 kg	26 July
Bronze	Eljoe Gotuoh	Para-athletics	Men's long jump T20	28 July
Bronze	Amirul Danial Abdul Rahim; Soufi Rusli	Bowls	Men's pairs	2 August
Bronze	Jariah Zakaria; Norazian Daud	Bowls	Women's pairs	2 August

== 3x3 basketball ==
Malaysia qualified a men's running and wheelchair 3x3 basketball teams.

=== Men's tournament ===
Group B

Pos	Team	Pld	W	L	PF	PA	PD	Qualification
1	England	5	5	0	105	70	+35	Direct to semi-finals
2	Malaysia	5	4	1	103	82	+21	Quarter-finals
3	Singapore	5	2	3	88	86	+2	Quarter-finals
4	Kenya	5	2	3	82	82	0	
5	Fiji	5	1	4	66	97	−31	
6	Jamaica	5	1	4	77	104	−27	

Source: Glasgow 2026
Rules for classification: 1) Wins; 2) Head-to-head record; 3) Points scored.

25 July 2026
10:50

Report

Malaysia	21–16	Fiji
Pts: Ting 7		Pts: Sewabu 7

SEC, Glasgow

25 July 2026
17:25

Report

Kenya	15–21	Malaysia
Pts: Gichohi 7		Pts: Ting 10

SEC, Glasgow

25 July 2026
19:00

Report

Singapore	15–21	Malaysia
Pts: Ching 7		Pts: Ting 9

SEC, Glasgow

27 July 2026
13:35

Report

England	21–19	Malaysia
Pts: Lautier-Ogunleye 8		Pts: Chong, Ting 6

SEC, Glasgow

27 July 2026
20:45

Report

Malaysia	21–15	Jamaica
Pts: Chang 11		Pts: Lawrence Anderson 6

SEC, Glasgow

=== Men's wheelchair tournament ===
Group B

Pos	Team	Pld	W	L	PF	PA	PD	Qualification
1	Scotland	3	3	0	54	25	+29	Semi-finals
2	South Africa	3	2	1	38	37	+1	Play-ins
3	Wales	3	1	2	36	50	−14	Play-ins
4	Malaysia	3	0	3	29	45	−16	

Source: Glasgow 2026
Rules for classification: 1) Wins; 2) Head-to-head record; 3) Points scored.

25 July 2026
16:35

Report

Wales	14–13	Malaysia
Pts: May 8		Pts: Zakaria 10

SEC Centre, Glasgow

26 July 2026
17:00

Report

Malaysia	6–18	Scotland
Pts: Zakaria 3		Pts: Erskine 12

SEC Centre, Glasgow

27 July 2026
18:15

Report

Malaysia	10–13	South Africa
Pts: three players 3		Pts: Williams 6

SEC Centre, Glasgow

== Artistic gymnastics ==
Malaysia entered three gymnasts of each gender.

Men
Individual Qualification

Athlete	Event	Apparatus					
Athlete	Event	F	PH	R	V	PB	HB
Sharul Aimy	Qualification	13.250 Q	12.100	—N/a	13.725 Q	—N/a	—N/a
Ng Chun Chen	Qualification	—N/a	12.400	—N/a	—N/a	DNF	12.850
Luqman Al-Hafiz Zulfa	Qualification	DNS					

Individual Finals

Athlete	Apparatus	Score	Rank
Sharul Aimy	Vault	13.733	4
Sharul Aimy	Floor	12.566	8

Women
Team Final & Individual Qualification

Athlete	Event	Apparatus				Total	Rank
Athlete	Event	VT	UB	BB	FL	Total	Rank
Rachel Yeoh	Qualification	—N/a	13.800 Q	—N/a			
Yeap Kang Xian	Qualification	12.700	11.350	12.500	10.450 R	47.000	16 Q
Cadence Teh Zi Qi	Qualification	11.750	12.350	10.850	11.800	46.750	18 Q
Total	Qualification	24.450	37.500	23.350	22.250	107.550	11

All-around Finals

Athlete	Event	Apparatus				Total	Rank
Athlete	Event	VT	UB	BB	FL	Total	Rank
Yeap Kang Xian	Finals	12.900	12.250	12.650	11.900	49.700	8
Cadence Teh Zi Qi	Finals	12.000	11.550	12.950	11.800	48.300	12

Individual Finals

Athlete	Apparatus	Score	Rank
Rachel Yeoh	Uneven bars	13.533	4

== Athletics ==
=== Para-athletics ===
Men
Track and road events

Athlete	Event	Heat		Semifinal		Final	
Athlete	Event	Result	Rank	Result	Rank	Result	Rank
Muhammad Nurhelme Mohd Rabi	100 m T11/T12	11.23	3	—N/a		Did not advance	

Field events

Athlete	Event	Qualification		Final	
Athlete	Event	Distance	Rank	Distance	Rank
Abdul Latif Romly	Long jump T20	—N/a		7.17	1st place, gold medalist(s)
Eljoe Gotuoh	Long jump T20	—N/a		6.51	3rd place, bronze medalist(s)

== Bowls ==
Malaysia announced a team of eight bowlers (three men and five women). This included a women's pair team in the para bowls discipline.

Athlete	Event	Group Stage						Semifinal	Final / BM	
Athlete	Event	Opposition Score	Opposition Score	Opposition Score	Opposition Score	Opposition Score	Rank	Opposition Score	Opposition Score	Rank
Izzat Dzulkeple	Singles	Alexander (FLK); W 2–0	Parnis (MLT); W 1.5–0.5	Sonowal (IND); W 2–0	Hamada (KEN); W 2–0	Bester (CAN); W 1*–1	1 Q	Wilson (AUS); W 1*–1	Tolchard (ENG); L 0–2	2nd place, silver medalist(s)
Soufi Rusli; Amirul Danial Rahim	Men's pairs	Malta; W 1*–1	Jersey; W 1*–1	Niue; W 2–0	Wales; W 2–0	Guernsey; W 1.5–0.5	1 Q	Northern Ireland; L 1–1*	Canada; W 1.5–0.5	3rd place, bronze medalist(s)
Emma Firyana Saroji	Women's singles	Whitehead (IOM); W 2–0	Mkandawire (ZAM); W 2–0	Saikia (IND); W 1.5–0.5	Herselman (RSA); W 2–0	Williams (WAL); W 2–0	1 Q	Merrien (GGY); L 0–2	Wilson (NFK); L 0–2	4
Syafiqa Haider; Aleena Nawawi	Women's pairs	Falkland Islands; W 2-0	Jersey; W 2-0	Cook Islands; W 2-0	Scotland; W 2-0	Norfolk Island; W 1.5–0.5	1 Q	Northern Ireland; W 1*–1	England; L 0.5–1.5	2nd place, silver medalist(s)

=== Para bowls ===
Athlete	Event	Group Stage						Semifinal	Final / BM	
Athlete	Event	Opposition Score	Opposition Score	Opposition Score	Opposition Score	Opposition Score	Rank	Opposition Score	Opposition Score	Rank
Jariah Zakaria; Norazian Daud	Women's pairs B6–8	Scotland; W 1*–1	New Zealand; L 0–2	England; W 2–0	Australia; L 0.5–1.5	Canada; W 2–0	4 Q	New Zealand; L 0.5–1.5	Scotland; W 2–0	3rd place, bronze medalist(s)

== Judo ==
Malaysia entered one male judoka.

Athlete	Event	Round of 16	Quarterfinals	Semifinals	Repechage	Final/BM	
Athlete	Event	Opposition Result	Opposition Result	Opposition Result	Opposition Result	Opposition Result	Rank
Amir Daniel Abdul Majeed	Men's 81 kg	Bye	Nkero (GAB); W 1s1–0s1	Ochi (AUS); W 1–0s1	Bye	Meuwsen (RSA); W 10–0	1st place, gold medalist(s)

== Swimming ==
Athlete	Event	Heat		Semifinal		Final	
Athlete	Event	Time	Rank	Time	Rank	Time	Rank
Tan Khai Xin	200 m butterfly	2:07.37	15	—N/a		Did not advance	
Tan Khai Xin	200 m individual medley	2:06.20	12	—N/a		Did not advance	
Tan Khai Xin	400 m freestyle	3:57.54	14	—N/a		Did not advance	
Tan Khai Xin	400 m individual medley	4:25.64	8 Q	—N/a		4:23.29	8
Arvin Chahal	50 m freestyle	23.85	29	Did not advance			
Lim Yin Chuen	50 m freestyle	23.82	28	Did not advance			
Arvin Chahal	100 m freestyle	51.08	29	Did not advance			
Lim Yin Chuen	100 m freestyle	51.19	31	Did not advance			
Arvin Chahal	200 m freestyle	1:51.21	17	Did not advance|			
Lim Yin Chuen	200 m freestyle	1:51.76	19	Did not advance|			
Khiew Hoe Yean	400 m freestyle	3:54.23	10	—N/a		Did not advance	
Khiew Hoe Yean	800 m freestyle	—N/a				8:04.47	7
Khiew Hoe Yean	1500 m freestyle	—N/a				15:29.30	6
Arvin Chahal; Khiew Hoe Yean; Lim Yin Chuen; Tan Khai Xin	4 × 100 metre freestyle relay	3:23.90	6 Q	—N/a		3:24.32	7
Arvin Chahal; Khiew Hoe Yean; Lim Yin Chuen; Tan Khai Xin	4 × 200 metre freestyle relay	7:39.38	5 Q	—N/a		7:23.72	5

Para Swimming

Athlete	Event	Heat		Semifinal		Final	
Athlete	Event	Time	Rank	Time	Rank	Time	Rank
Ethan Khoo Yin Jun	Men's 200 m freestyle S14	2:05.11	5 Q	—N/a		2:05.25	4
Abd Halim Mohammad	Men's 100 m breaststroke SB9	1:16.82	7 Q	—N/a		1:16.41	6
Muhammad Nur Syaiful Zulkafli	Men's 50 m freestyle S7	35.05	5 Q	—N/a		34.62	6

== Track cycling ==
Sprint

Athlete	Event	Qualification		Round 1	Quarterfinals	Semifinals	Finals/ BM	
Athlete	Event	Time	Rank	Opposition Time	Opposition Time	Opposition Time	Opposition Time	Rank
Azizulhasni Awang	Men's sprint	9.715	9 Q	England; J. Truman; W 10.252	Australia; L. Hoffman; L +1.672 +0.096	Did not advance		
Shah Firdaus Sahrom	Men's sprint	9.805	10 Q	Australia; D. Barber; L +0.094	Did not advance			
Mohd Khairul Hazwan Wahab; Muhammad Nabil Wafiq Zamri (pilot)	Men's tandem sprint B	10.491	4 Q	—N/a		Scotland; N. Fachie; L +0.174 +0.505	Australia; K. Perris; L +0.179 +2.145	4
Izzah Izzati Mohd Asri	Women's sprint	10.706	11 Q	Scotland; I. Moir; W 11.251	England; R. Parris Smith; W +0.047; 11.068; 11.559	England; S. Capewell; L 11.144 +0.000 +0.017	Wales; R. Edmunds; L +0.112 +0.118	4
Nur Alyssa Mohd Farid	Women's sprint	10.882	15 Q	England; S. Capewell; K 11.228	Did not advance			
Nur Azlia Syafinaz Mohd Zais; Nurul Suhada Zainal (pilot)	Women's tandem sprint B	12.799	6	—N/a		Did not advance		
Nur Suraiya Muhammad Zamri; Farina Shawati Mohd Adnan (pilot)	Women's tandem sprint B	11.834	5	—N/a		Did not advance		

Keirin

Athlete	Event	Round 1	Repechage	Semifinal	Final
Azizulhasni Awang	Men's keirin	2 Q	bye	2 QG	1st place, gold medalist(s)
Shah Firdaus Sahrom	Men's keirin	2 Q	bye	4 Q7-12	7
Izzah Izzati Mohd Asri	Women's keirin	2 Q	bye	4 Q7-12	10
Nur Alyssa Mohd Farid	Women's keirin	5 R	4	Did not advance	

Pursuit

Athlete	Event	Qualification		Final/ BG	
Athlete	Event	Time	Rank	Opposition Result	Rank
Mohamad Yusof Hafizi Shaharuddin	Men's individual pursuit C1-3	3:41.066	5	Did not advance	

Time trial

Athlete	Event	Time	Rank
Azizulhasni Awang	Men's 1 km time trial	1:01.357	10
Mohd Khairul Hazwan Wahab; Muhammad Nabil Wafiq Zamri (pilot)	Men's tandem 1 km time trial B	1:05.863	4
Mohamad Yusof Hafizi Shaharuddin	Men's 1 km time trial C1-3	1:08.658	4
Izzah Izzati Mohd Asri	Women's 1 km time trial	1:08.673	12
Nur Azlia Syafinaz Mohd Zais; Nurul Suhada Zainal (pilot)	Women's tandem 1 km time trial B	1:15.602	6
Nur Suraiya Muhammad Zamri; Farina Shawati Mohd Adnan (pilot)	Women's tandem 1 km time trial B	1:13.507	5

Points race

Athlete	Event	Final	
Athlete	Event	Points	Rank
Lau New Joe	Men's points race	DNS	

Scratch race

Athlete	Event	Rank	
Athlete	Event	Qualification	Final
Lau New Joe	Men's scratch race	2 Q	DNF

Elimination race

Athlete	Event	Final
Lau New Joe	Men's elimination race	14

== Weightlifting ==
Malaysia qualified nine weightlifters (six men and three women).

Men

Athlete	Event	Snatch (kg)		Clean & Jerk (kg)		Total (kg)	Rank
Athlete	Event	Result	Rank	Result	Rank	Total (kg)	Rank
Aniq Kasdan	Men's 60 kg	121	1	152 GR	1	273 GR	1st place, gold medalist(s)
Aznil Bidin	Men's 65 kg	133 GR	1	166 GR	1	299 GR	1st place, gold medalist(s)
Erry Hidayat	Men's 79 kg	147	3	184 GR	1	331 GR	1st place, gold medalist(s)
Hafizuddin Roslin	Men's 88 kg	162 GR	1	183	2	345 GR	1st place, gold medalist(s)
Mohamad Syahmi	Men's 94 kg	150	4	197 GR	1	347 GR	1st place, gold medalist(s)
Farris Haikal	Men's +100 kg	142	6	180	6	322	6

Women

Athlete	Event	Snatch (kg)		Clean & Jerk (kg)		Total (kg)	Rank
Athlete	Event	Result	Rank	Result	Rank	Total (kg)	Rank
Irene Jane Henry	Women's 48 kg	77	2	90	3	167	3rd place, bronze medalist(s)
Nur Syazwani Radzi	Women's 63 kg	88	7	115	4	203	6
Siti Aqilah Farhana	Women's +86 kg	113	3	140	2	253	2nd place, silver medalist(s)

=== Para powerlifting ===
Malaysia entered three male para powerlifter lifters.

Athlete	Event	Result	Rank
Bonnie Bunyau Gustin	Men's lightweight	153.5	3rd place, bronze medalist(s)
Nicodemus Maggoi Moses	Men's heavyweight	120.3	4
Bryan Junency Gustin	Men's heavyweight	No Lift	DNF
