= Malaya at the 1962 British Empire and Commonwealth Games =

- Flag of Malaya
- CG code: MAL
- CGA: Federation of Malaya Olympic Council
- Website: olympic.org.my

in Perth, Western Australia
- Competitors: 14 in 4 sports
- Flag bearers: Opening: Closing:
- Medals Ranked 17th: Gold 0 Silver 0 Bronze 1 Total 1

British Empire and Commonwealth Games appearances
- 1950; 1954; 1958; 1962; 1966; 1970; 1974; 1978; 1982; 1986; 1990; 1994; 1998; 2002; 2006; 2010; 2014; 2018; 2022; 2026; 2030

The Federation of Malaya competed at the 1962 British Empire and Commonwealth Games in Perth, Western Australia, from 22 November to 1 December 1962.

== Medalists ==
Medal	Name	Sport	Event	Date
Bronze	Cheong Kam Hong	Weightlifting	Men's featherweight	

== Athletics ==
Men
Track events

Athlete	Event	Round 1		Round 2		Semifinal		Final	
Athlete	Event	Result	Rank	Result	Rank	Result	Rank	Result	Rank
Mazlan Hamzah	100 yd	10.5	5	Did not advance					
Mazlan Hamzah	220 yd	23.4	4	Did not advance					
Victor Asirvatham	440 yd	49.4	4	—N/a		Did not advance			
Mohamed Abdul Rahiman	440 yd	51.2	5	—N/a		Did not advance			
Karu Selvaratnam	440 yd	50.3	4	—N/a		Did not advance			
Mohamed Abdul Rahiman	880 yd	1:59.7	5	—N/a		Did not advance			
Ramasamy Subramaniam	880 yd	1:59.9	4	—N/a		Did not advance			
Ramasamy Subramaniam	1 mile	4:31.2	8	—N/a				Did not advance	
Karu Selvaratnam	440 yd hurdles	54.2	4	—N/a				Did not advance	
Victor Asirvatham; Mazlan Hamzah; Mohamed Abdul Rahiman; Karu Selvaratnam	4×440 yd relay	3:22.5	4	—N/a				Did not advance	

Key

- Note–Ranks given for track events are within the athlete's heat only
- N/A = Round not applicable for the event

== Cycling ==
=== Road ===
Athlete	Event	Time	Rank
Abdullah Abu	Men's individual road race		15
A. Michael	Men's individual road race	DNF	
N. A. Rosli	Men's individual road race		18
Shaharuddin Jaafar	Men's individual road race	DNF	

=== Track ===
Sprint

Athlete	Event	Qualification		Final	
Athlete	Event	Time	Rank	Time	Rank
Abdullah Abu	Men's sprint				
N. A. Rosli	Men's sprint				
Shahruddin Jaafar	Men's sprint				

Time trial

Athlete	Event	Time	Rank
Abdullah Abu	Men's 1000 m time trial	1:22.1	15
N. A. Rosli	Men's 1000 m time trial	1:26.3	17
Shahruddin Jaafar	Men's 1000 m time trial	1:25.0	16

Pursuit

Athlete	Event	Heat		Quarterfinals		Semifinals		Final	
Athlete	Event	Opponent Result	Rank	Opponent Result	Rank	Opponent Result	Rank	Opponent Result	Rank
Abdullah Abu	Men's individual pursuit	5:55.2		Did not advance					
A. Michael	Men's individual pursuit	6:10.6		Did not advance					
N. A. Rosli	Men's individual pursuit	6:02.0		Did not advance					

Scratch race

Athlete	Event	Qualification		Final	
Athlete	Event	Time	Rank	Time	Rank
Abdullah Abu	Men's scratch race				
N. A. Rosli	Men's scratch race				
Shahruddin Jaafar	Men's scratch race				

== Swimming ==
Men

Athlete	Event	Heat		Final	
Athlete	Event	Time	Rank	Time	Rank
Keng S. Y.	110 yards freestyle	1:02.6	6	Did not advance	
Lim Heng Chek	110 yards backstroke	1:11.8	6	Did not advance	

== Weightlifting ==
Men

Athlete	Event	Military press		Snatch		Clean & jerk		Total	Rank
Athlete	Event	Result	Rank	Result	Rank	Result	Rank	Total	Rank
Cheong Kam Hong	60 kg							620 lb	3rd place, bronze medalist(s)
Cheah C. M.	67.5 kg					–	–	–	DNF
Leong Chim Seong	90 kg							875 lb	4
