= Au Li Yen =

Malaysian gymnast

- Alternative name: Alexina Au
- Born: 1 April 1982 (age 44) Kuala Lumpur, Malaysia
- Height: 1.50 m (4 ft 11 in)

Gymnastics career
- Discipline: Women's artistic gymnastics
- Country represented: Malaysia
- Club: Gemilang
Medal record
Women's artistic gymnastics
Representing Malaysia
Southeast Asian Games
Gold medal – first place	1997 Jakarta	Team
Gold medal – first place	1997 Jakarta	All-around
Gold medal – first place	1997 Jakarta	Vault
Gold medal – first place	2001 Kuala Lumpur	Team
Gold medal – first place	2001 Kuala Lumpur	Vault
Silver medal – second place	2001 Kuala Lumpur	Floor exercise

Au Alexina Li Yen (born 1 April 1982) is a Malaysian former artistic gymnast. She competed at the 2000 Summer Olympics, becoming Malaysia's first Olympian in gymnastics. She is a two-time SEA Games champion on the vault and is the 1997 SEA Games all-around champion.

== Gymnastics career ==
Au won the all-around title at the 1997 SEA Games in addition to helping Malaysia win the team title. She then won a third gold medal in the vault final. After this performance, the Olympic Council of Malaysia awarded her the "Olympian of the Year". She represented Malaysia at the 1998 Commonwealth Games and finished 17th in the all-around final, where the Malaysian team also placed seventh. Additionally, she advanced into the vault final and finished fifth, and she also finished sixth in both the balance beam and floor exercise finals. As of 2026, her results in these three apparatus finals are Malaysia's best results on these events at the Commonwealth Games. She competed at the 1999 World Championships and finished 66th in the all-around qualifications.

Au qualified to represent Malaysia at the 2000 Summer Olympics and became the country's first Olympian in gymnastics. She competed at the event with a knee injury, leading to her only competing a simplified routine on the uneven bars. She received a score of 6.525 to finish 84th in the qualification round. She returned to competition in time for the 2001 SEA Games, where she helped Malaysia defend its team title. She also once again won the vault title, and she won a silver medal on the floor exercise.
