= Malaysia at the 1990 Commonwealth Games =

- CGF code: MAS
- CGA: Olympic Council of Malaysia
- Website: olympic.org.my

in Auckland, New Zealand
- Competitors: 13 in 4 sports
- Medals Ranked 10th: Gold 2 Silver 2 Bronze 0 Total 4

Commonwealth Games appearances (overview)
- 1950; 1954; 1958; 1962; 1966; 1970; 1974; 1978; 1982; 1986; 1990; 1994; 1998; 2002; 2006; 2010; 2014; 2018; 2022; 2026; 2030

Other related appearances
- British North Borneo (1958, 1962); Sarawak (1958, 1962)

Malaysia competed in the 1990 Commonwealth Games held in Auckland, New Zealand from 24 January to 3 February 1990.

== Medal summary ==
=== Medals by sport ===
Sport	Gold	Silver	Bronze	Total	Rank
Badminton	2	2	0	4	2
Total	2	2	0	4	10

=== Medallists ===
Medal	Name	Sport	Event
Gold	Rashid Sidek	Badminton	Men's singles
Gold	Jalani Sidek; Razif Sidek	Badminton	Men's doubles
Silver	Foo Kok Keong	Badminton	Men's singles
Silver	Cheah Soon Kit; Rashid Sidek	Badminton	Men's doubles

== Athletics ==
Men
Track event

Athlete	Event	Heat		Semifinal		Final	
Athlete	Event	Time	Rank	Time	Rank	Time	Rank
Samson Vellabouy	800 m	1:51.19	6	did not advance			

Field event

Athlete	Event	Final	
Athlete	Event	Distance	Rank
Mohamed Zaki Sadri	Triple jump	15.78	10

Women
Track event

Athlete	Event	Heat		Semifinal		Final	
Athlete	Event	Time	Rank	Time	Rank	Time	Rank
Josephine Mary Singarayar	400 m	55.85	6	—		did not advance	

Key

- Note–Ranks given for track events are within the athlete's heat only
- Q = Qualified for the next round
- q = Qualified for the next round as a fastest loser or, in field events, by position without achieving the qualifying target
- NR = National record
- N/A = Round not applicable for the event
- Bye = Athlete not required to compete in round

== Badminton ==
Athlete	Event	Round of 64	Round of 32	Round of 16	Quarterfinal	Semifinal	Final	Rank
Athlete	Event	Opposition Score	Opposition Score	Opposition Score	Opposition Score	Opposition Score	Opposition Score	Rank
Foo Kok Keong	Men's singles	W	W	W	W	W	Gold medal match Rashid Sidek (MAS); L	2nd place, silver medalist(s)
Rashid Sidek	Men's singles	W	W	W	W	W	Gold medal match Foo Kok Keong (MAS); W	1st place, gold medalist(s)
Jalani Sidek; Razif Sidek	Men's doubles	—	W	W	W	W	Gold medal match Cheah Soon Kit; Rashid Sidek (MAS); W	1st place, gold medalist(s)
Cheah Soon Kit; Rashid Sidek	Men's doubles	—	W	W	W	W	Gold medal match Jalani Sidek; Razif Sidek (MAS); L	2nd place, silver medalist(s)
Lee Wai Leng	Women's singles	—	L	did not advance				
Tan Lee Wai	Women's singles	—	L	did not advance				
Lee Wai Leng; Tan Lee Wai	Women's doubles	—		W	L	did not advance		
Lim Siew Choon; Tan Sui Hoon	Women's doubles	—		W	W	W	Bronze medal match Denyse Julien; Johanne Falardeau (CAN); L	4
Cheah Soon Kit; Tan Lee Wai	Mixed doubles	—	W	L	did not advance			
Rashid Sidek; Lim Siew Choon	Mixed doubles	—	L	did not advance				
Cheah Soon Kit; Foo Kok Keong; Jalani Sidek; Lee Wai Leng; Lim Siew Choon; Razif Sidek; Tan Lee Wai; Tan Sui Hoon	Mixed team	—		W	L	did not advance		

== Cycling ==
=== Road ===
Athlete	Event	Time	Rank
Murugayan Kumaresan	Men's road race	4:36:19.50	12

=== Track ===
Points race

Athlete	Event	Final	
Athlete	Event	Points	Rank
Murugayan Kumaresan	Men's points race	–	DNF

== Swimming ==
Men

Athlete	Event	Final	
Athlete	Event	Time	Rank
Jeffrey Ong	200 m freestyle	1:58.08	17
Jeffrey Ong	400 m freestyle	4:06.53	15
Jeffrey Ong	1500 m freestyle	15:48.73	11
