= Koh Eng Tong =

Malaysian weightlifter and photographer

Koh Eng Tong 辜荣堂 AMN
Personal information
- Nickname: Iron Man of Malaya
- Nationality: Malaysian
- Born: 22 August 1917 Seremban, Federated Malay States (now Negri Sembilan, Malaysia)
- Died: 2 October 2006 (aged 89) Malaysia
- Resting place: Nirvana Memorial Park; Semenyih, Selangor
- Occupations: Weightlifter; Photographer
- Spouse: Wong Yoke Lan
- Children: Ronnie Koh; Tony Koh; Jerry Koh; Maureen Koh

Sport
- Sport: Weightlifting
- Retired: 7 February 1958
Medal record
Men's weightlifting
Representing Malaya
British Empire Games
Gold medal – first place	1950 Auckland	310.5 kg
National Games of the Republic of China
Gold medal – first place	1948 Shanghai	297.5 kg

Koh Eng Tong
- Traditional Chinese: 辜榮堂
- Simplified Chinese: 辜荣堂
Transcriptions
Standard Mandarin
- Hanyu Pinyin: Gū Róngtáng
Yue: Cantonese
- Jyutping: gu1 wing4 tong4
Southern Min
- Hokkien POJ: Ko͘ Êng-tông

Koh Eng Tong (Chinese: 辜荣堂; 22 August 1917 – 2 October 2006) was a weightlifter and photographer from Malaysia. Among the first to win the Commonwealth Games gold medal for Malaya, he played an instrumental part in bringing Malaysian sports to world prominence.

== Early life ==
Koh Eng Tong was a Straits Chinese of Cantonese ancestry born in Seremban, Negri Sembilan.

In 1937, Koh started weigh training while he was still a 17-year-old student in Kuala Lumpur, after being encouraged by his brother-in-law. In 1941, Koh returned to Seremban to organise the Adonis Bodybuilding Club there.

In the same year, Koh earned his first title at the Selangor weightlifting competition, where he won the featherweight gold medal after lifting 226.5 kg (500 lbs).

== Sports career ==
=== 1948 National Games of the Republic of China ===
The Republic of China decided to hold their 7th National Games in May 1948, after its postponement caused by World War II. Despite financial difficulties, the Malayan Chinese Organising Committee still assembled a contingent to the Games. Koh Eng Tong was part of 5 weightlifters sent there.

Koh won the middleweight title after lifting 297.5 kg (656 lbs).

=== 1950 British Empire Games ===
In 1950, Malaya was allowed for the first time to send a contingent to the 1950 British Empire Games held in Auckland, New Zealand. The weightlifters, short of money, were sponsored by Wong Hoi Onn, president of the Selangor Health and Strength Association to participate at the games. They had to fulfil the condition of winning a medal, or they would have to repay their expenses. All 4 weightlifters medalled.

Koh lifted 310.5 kg (685 lbs) in the featherweight category, winning him the gold medal.

=== 1956 Summer Olympics ===
Malaya was officially recognised by the International Olympic Committee (IOC) in 1954. Koh Eng Tong was among a contingent of 32 athletes sent by the Federation of Malaya Olympic Council to participate in the 1956 Summer Olympics in Melbourne, Australia.

Representing Malaya in the featherweight category, Koh lifted 285 kg (628 lbs), well off his personal best and finished in 17th place. He attributed his disappointing performance to him feeling numb out of coldness.

=== 1958 Retirement ===
Koh Eng Tong announced his retirement from competitive weightlifting on 7 February 1958.

== Photography career ==
Koh Eng Tong was an avid photographer. He had established multiple photography businesses over the years. He also briefly worked as a press photographer with The Straits Times as well.

In 1950, Koh became the founder and chairman of Eng Tong Systems Sdn. Bhd., a supplier of professional photographic equipment in Malaysia. The family-run business still functions today.

== Personal life ==
Koh Eng Tong was an official of the Selangor Health and Strength Association and a qualified international weightlifting referee.

He had damaged his vocal cords during weightlifting, leaving him with a hoarse voice ever since.

He reportedly had a habit of burning joss sticks before competitions. He burned a joss stick before his match in the 7th National Games of the Republic of China. He tried to do the same during the 1950 British Empire Games, but found it hard to find in New Zealand.

Koh managed to contact fellow Empire Games gold medallist Tho Fook Hung at The Penang Home for the Infirm and Aged on 28 October 1993. Tho died a few hours after his visit, with Koh helping the preparation of his funeral.

He had donated his Empire Games gold medal to the National Museum. He also donated artifacts and a photo he took of the 1956 Summer Olympics to the Australian Sports Museum.

=== Death ===
Koh Eng Tong died on 2 October 2006 at the age of 89. He was buried at Nirvana Memorial Park in Semenyih, Selangor.

== Honours ==
=== World's top 10 ===
In 1951, Koh Eng Tong was declared the world's 10th best featherweight weightlifter of 1950 by Oscar State, general secretary of the British Amateur Weight Lifters' Association in his book "The Weightlifter and Bodybuilder".

=== Hall of fame ===
In 1994, Koh was inducted to the Malaysia Hall of Fame for sportspersons by the Olympic Council of Malaysia (OCM). Koh had also presented to OCM a classic photo taken of him at the 1956 Summer Olympics in Melbourne.

=== 1998 Commonwealth Games ===
When Kuala Lumpur hosted the 1998 Commonwealth Games, Koh was honoured by becoming the final runner for the Queen's Baton Relay. His run was also shared with gymnast Nurul Fatiha Abd Hamid. They handed the baton, containing the Queen's message to Prince Edward as the Queen's representative in place of his father Prince Philip, the Commonwealth Games Federation president.

=== Order of the Defender of the Realm ===
In 1999, Koh was conferred Member of the Order of the Defender of the Realm (Ahli Mangku Negara) (AMN) in conjunction with the 73rd birthday of the Yang di-Pertuan Agong, Sultan Salahuddin Abdul Aziz Shah.

=== Best athletes of the century ===
In 1999, the Olympic Council of Malaysia had acknowledged Koh Eng Tong, Eddy Chong, Mani Jegathesan, Mokhtar Dahari and Lall Singh as Malaysia's best athletes of the 20th Century.

=== The Malaysia Book Of Records ===
Koh Eng Tong, along with Tho Fook Hung was included in The Malaysia Book Of Records as the first to win the Commonwealth Games gold medal for Malaya.

== See also ==
=== Malayan contingent to the 1950 British Empire Games ===
- Tho Fook Hung
- Thong Saw Pak
- Tan Kim Bee
- Lloyd Valberg
- Ng Liang Chiang
