= Malaysia at the 1974 British Commonwealth Games =

- CGF code: MAS
- CGA: Olympic Council of Malaysia
- Website: olympic.org.my

in Christchurch, New Zealand
- Competitors: 14 in 6 sports
- Medals Ranked 15th: Gold 1 Silver 0 Bronze 3 Total 4

British Commonwealth Games appearances
- 1950; 1954; 1958; 1962; 1966; 1970; 1974; 1978; 1982; 1986; 1990; 1994; 1998; 2002; 2006; 2010; 2014; 2018; 2022; 2026; 2030

Other related appearances
- British North Borneo (1958, 1962); Sarawak (1958, 1962)

Malaysia competed in the 1974 British Commonwealth Games held in Christchurch, New Zealand from 24 January to 2 February 1974.

== Medal summary ==
=== Medals by sport ===
| Sport | Gold | Silver | Bronze | Total | Rank |
|---|---|---|---|---|---|
| Badminton | 1 | 0 | 3 | 4 | 2 |
| Total | 1 | 0 | 3 | 4 | 15 |

=== Medallists ===
| Medal | Name | Sport | Event |
|---|---|---|---|
| Gold | Punch Gunalan | Badminton | Men's singles |
| Bronze | Punch Gunalan; Dominic Soong | Badminton | Men's doubles |
| Bronze | Sylvia Ng | Badminton | Women's singles |
| Bronze | Rosalind Singha Ang; Sylvia Ng | Badminton | Women's doubles |

== Athletics ==
Men
Track event

| Athlete | Event | Heat | | Final | |
| Athlete | Event | Time | Rank | Time | Rank |
|---|---|---|---|---|---|
| Ishtiaq Mubarak | 110 metres hurdles | 14.80 | 6 | did not advance | |

Women
Field event

| Athlete | Event | Final | |
| Athlete | Event | Distance | Rank |
|---|---|---|---|
| Gladys Chai Ng Mei | High jump | 1.70 | 9 |

Key

- Note–Ranks given for track events are within the athlete's heat only
- Q = Qualified for the next round
- q = Qualified for the next round as a fastest loser or, in field events, by position without achieving the qualifying target
- NR = National record
- N/A = Round not applicable for the event
- Bye = Athlete not required to compete in round

== Badminton ==
| Athlete | Event | Round of 64 | Round of 32 | Round of 16 | Quarterfinal | Semifinal | Final | Rank |
| Athlete | Event | Opposition Score | Opposition Score | Opposition Score | Opposition Score | Opposition Score | Opposition Score | Rank |
|---|---|---|---|---|---|---|---|---|
| Dominic Soong | Men's singles | W | W | W | L | did not advance | | |
| Moo Foot Lian | Men's singles | W | W | L | did not advance | | | |
| Punch Gunalan | Men's singles | W | W | W | W | W | Gold medal match Jamie Paulson (CAN); W | 1st place, gold medalist(s) |
| Tan Aik Mong | Men's singles | W | W | L | did not advance | | | |
| Moo Foot Lian; Tan Aik Mong | Men's doubles | — | W | W | L | did not advance | | |
| Punch Gunalan; Dominic Soong | Men's doubles | — | W | W | W | W | Bronze medal match Fraser Gow; Robert S. McCoig (SCO); W | 3rd place, bronze medalist(s) |
| Rosalind Singha Ang | Women's singles | — | W | W | L | did not advance | | |
| Sylvia Ng Meow Eng | Women's singles | — | W | W | W | W | Bronze medal match Susan Whetnall (ENG); W | 3rd place, bronze medalist(s) |
| Rosalind Singha Ang; Sylvia Ng Meow Eng | Women's doubles | — | | W | W | W | Bronze medal match Judy Rollick; Mimi Nilsson (CAN); W | 3rd place, bronze medalist(s) |
| Moo Foot Lian; Rosalind Singha Ang | Mixed doubles | — | W | L | did not advance | | | |
| Punch Gunalan; Sylvia Ng Meow Eng | Mixed doubles | — | W | L | did not advance | | | |

== Cycling ==
=== Track ===
Sprint

| Athlete | Event | Qualification | | Final | |
| Athlete | Event | Time | Rank | Time | Rank |
|---|---|---|---|---|---|
| Daud Ibrahim | Men's sprint | | | | |
| Ramli Hashim | Men's sprint | | | | |

Time trial

| Athlete | Event | Time | Rank |
|---|---|---|---|
| Daud Ibrahim | Men's 1000 m time trial | 1:17.58 | 19 |
| Ramli Hashim | Men's 1000 m time trial | 1:21.30 | 26 |

Scratch race

| Athlete | Event | Qualification | | Final | |
| Athlete | Event | Time | Rank | Time | Rank |
|---|---|---|---|---|---|
| Daud Ibrahim | Men's scratch race | | | | |
| Ramli Hashim | Men's scratch race | | | | |

== Shooting ==
Men

| Athlete | Event | Final | |
| Athlete | Event | Points | Rank |
|---|---|---|---|
| Ally Ong | Skeet | 187 | 6 |

== Swimming ==
Men

| Athlete | Event | Heat | | Final | |
| Athlete | Event | Time | Rank | Time | Rank |
|---|---|---|---|---|---|
| Chiang Jin Choon | 100 m backstroke | 1:05.23 | 7 | did not advance | |
| Chiang Jin Choon | 200 m backstroke | 2:21.52 | 7 | did not advance | |
| Chiang Jin Choon | 200 m individual medley | 2:26.00 | 7 | did not advance | |

Women

| Athlete | Event | Heat | | Final | |
| Athlete | Event | Time | Rank | Time | Rank |
|---|---|---|---|---|---|
| Rosanna Lam Ai Leng | 100 m breaststroke | 1:24.94 | 6 | did not advance | |
| Rosanna Lam Ai Leng | 200 m breaststroke | 2:59.60 | 5 | did not advance | |

== Weightlifting ==
Men

| Athlete | Event | Military press | | Snatch | | Clean & jerk | | Total | Rank |
| Athlete | Event | Result | Rank | Result | Rank | Result | Rank | Total | Rank |
|---|---|---|---|---|---|---|---|---|---|
| Sua Hingboo | 56 kg | | | | | | | 172.5 | 4 |
