= Malaya at the 1958 British Empire and Commonwealth Games =

- Flag of Malaya
- CGF code: MAL
- CGA: Federation of Malaya Olympic Council
- Website: olympic.org.my

in Cardiff, Wales
- Competitors: 3 in 2 sports
- Medals Ranked 15th: Gold 0 Silver 2 Bronze 0 Total 2

British Empire and Commonwealth Games appearances
- 1950; 1954; 1958; 1962; 1966; 1970; 1974; 1978; 1982; 1986; 1990; 1994; 1998; 2002; 2006; 2010; 2014; 2018; 2022; 2026; 2030

Federation of Malaya competed in the 1958 British Empire and Commonwealth Games held in Cardiff, Wales from 18 to 26 July 1958. It won 2 silver medals.

== Medal summary ==
=== Medals by sport ===
Sport	Gold	Silver	Bronze	Total	Rank
Weightlifting	0	2	0	2	7
Total	0	2	0	2	15

=== Medallists ===
Medal	Name	Sport	Event
Silver	Chung Kum Weng	Weightlifting	Men's 60 kg
Silver	Tan Kim Bee	Weightlifting	Men's 90 kg

== Athletics ==
Men
Track event

Athlete	Event	Heat		Quarterfinal		Semifinal		Final	
Athlete	Event	Time	Rank	Time	Rank	Time	Rank	Time	Rank
Abdul Rahim Ahmad	440 yards			49.4	5	did not advance			

Key

- Note–Ranks given for track events are within the athlete's heat only
- Q = Qualified for the next round
- q = Qualified for the next round as a fastest loser or, in field events, by position without achieving the qualifying target
- NR = National record
- N/A = Round not applicable for the event
- Bye = Athlete not required to compete in round

== Weightlifting ==
Men

Athlete	Event	Military press		Snatch		Clean & jerk		Total	Rank
Athlete	Event	Result	Rank	Result	Rank	Result	Rank	Total	Rank
Chung Kum Weng	60 kg							675 lb	2nd place, silver medalist(s)
Tan Kim Bee	90 kg							865 lb	2nd place, silver medalist(s)
