= Malaysia at the 1982 Commonwealth Games =

- CGF code: MAS
- CGA: Olympic Council of Malaysia
- Website: olympic.org.my

in Brisbane, Australia
- Competitors: 5 in 1 sport
- Medals Ranked 13th: Gold 1 Silver 0 Bronze 1 Total 2

Commonwealth Games appearances (overview)
- 1950; 1954; 1958; 1962; 1966; 1970; 1974; 1978; 1982; 1986; 1990; 1994; 1998; 2002; 2006; 2010; 2014; 2018; 2022; 2026; 2030

Other related appearances
- British North Borneo (1958, 1962); Sarawak (1958, 1962)

Malaysia competed in the 1982 Commonwealth Games held in Brisbane, Queensland, Australia from 30 September to 9 October 1982.

== Medal summary ==
=== Medals by sport ===
Sport	Gold	Silver	Bronze	Total	Rank
Badminton	1	0	1	2	3
Total	1	0	1	2	13

=== Medallists ===
Medal	Name	Sport	Event
Gold	Ong Beng Teong; Razif Sidek	Badminton	Men's doubles
Bronze	Razif Sidek	Badminton	Men's singles

== Badminton ==
Athlete	Event	Round of 64	Round of 32	Round of 16	Quarterfinal	Semifinal	Final	Rank
Athlete	Event	Opposition Score	Opposition Score	Opposition Score	Opposition Score	Opposition Score	Opposition Score	Rank
Ong Beng Teong	Men's singles	W	L	did not advance				
Razif Sidek	Men's singles	W	W	W	W	W	Bronze medal match Keith Priestman (CAN); W	3rd place, bronze medalist(s)
Ong Beng Teong; Razif Sidek	Men's doubles	—	W	W	W	W	Gold medal match Martin Dew; Nick Yates (ENG); W	1st place, gold medalist(s)
Katherine Teh Swee Phek	Women's singles	W	W	L	did not advance			
Leong Chai Lean	Women's singles	W	W	L	did not advance			
Katherine Teh Swee Phek; Leong Chai Lean	Women's doubles	—		L	did not advance			
Ong Beng Teong; Katherine Teh Swee Phek	Mixed doubles	—	L	did not advance				
James Selvaraj; Katherine Teh Swee Phek; Leong Chai Lean; Ong Beng Teong; Razif Sidek	Mixed team	—		W	L	did not advance		
