= Malaysia at the 1970 British Commonwealth Games =

- CGF code: MAS
- CGA: Olympic Council of Malaysia
- Website: olympic.org.my

in Edinburgh, Scotland
- Competitors: 14 in 3 sports
- Medals Ranked 15th: Gold 1 Silver 1 Bronze 1 Total 3

British Commonwealth Games appearances
- 1950; 1954; 1958; 1962; 1966; 1970; 1974; 1978; 1982; 1986; 1990; 1994; 1998; 2002; 2006; 2010; 2014; 2018; 2022; 2026; 2030

Other related appearances
- British North Borneo (1958, 1962); Sarawak (1958, 1962)

Malaysia competed in the 1970 British Commonwealth Games held in Edinburgh, Scotland from 16 to 25 July 1970.

== Medal summary ==
=== Medals by sport ===
| Sport | Gold | Silver | Bronze | Total | Rank |
|---|---|---|---|---|---|
| Badminton | 1 | 1 | 1 | 3 | 2 |
| Total | 1 | 1 | 1 | 3 | 15 |

=== Medallists ===
| Medal | Name | Sport | Event |
|---|---|---|---|
| Gold | Ng Boon Bee; Punch Gunalan | Badminton | Men's doubles |
| Silver | Ng Tat Wai; Tan Soon Hooi | Badminton | Men's doubles |
| Bronze | Rosalind Singha Ang; Teoh Siew Yong | Badminton | Women's doubles |

== Badminton ==
| Athlete | Event | Round of 64 | Round of 32 | Round of 16 | Quarterfinal | Semifinal | Final | Rank |
| Athlete | Event | Opposition Score | Opposition Score | Opposition Score | Opposition Score | Opposition Score | Opposition Score | Rank |
|---|---|---|---|---|---|---|---|---|
| Abdul Rahman Mohamed | Men's singles | W | W | W | L | did not advance | | |
| Punch Gunalan | Men's singles | W | W | W | L | did not advance | | |
| Ng Boon Bee; Punch Gunalan | Men's doubles | — | W | W | W | W | Gold medal match Ng Tat Wai; Tan Soon Hooi (MAS); W | 1st place, gold medalist(s) |
| Ng Tat Wai; Tan Soon Hooi | Men's doubles | — | W | W | W | W | Gold medal match Ng Boon Bee; Punch Gunalan (MAS); L | 2nd place, silver medalist(s) |
| Gaik Bee Khaw | Women's singles | — | L | did not advance | | | | |
| Rosalind Singha Ang | Women's singles | — | W | W | L | did not advance | | |
| Sylvia Ng Meow Eng | Women's singles | — | W | W | W | W | Bronze medal match Margaret Boxall (ENG); L | 4 |
| Teoh Siew Yong | Women's singles | — | W | W | L | did not advance | | |
| Rosalind Singha Ang; Teoh Siew Yong | Women's doubles | — | | W | W | W | Bronze medal match Sylvia Ng Meow Eng; Tan S. (MAS); W | 3rd place, bronze medalist(s) |
| Sylvia Ng Meow Eng; Tan S. | Women's doubles | — | | W | W | W | Bronze medal match Rosalind Singha Ang; Teoh Siew Yong (MAS); L | 4 |
| Ng Boon Bee; Rosalind Singha Ang | Mixed doubles | — | | L | did not advance | | | |
| Ng Tat Wai; Gaik Bee Khaw | Mixed doubles | — | | L | did not advance | | | |

== Fencing ==
Three male fencers represented Malaysia in fencing.

== Weightlifting ==
Men

| Athlete | Event | Military press | | Snatch | | Clean & jerk | | Total | Rank |
| Athlete | Event | Result | Rank | Result | Rank | Result | Rank | Total | Rank |
|---|---|---|---|---|---|---|---|---|---|
| Sua Hingboo | 52 kg | | | | | | | 255 | 4 |
