= Malaysia at the 1978 Commonwealth Games =

- CGF code: MAS
- CGA: Olympic Council of Malaysia
- Website: olympic.org.my

in Edmonton, Alberta, Canada
- Competitors: 20 in 5 sports
- Medals Ranked 12th: Gold 1 Silver 2 Bronze 1 Total 4

Commonwealth Games appearances (overview)
- 1950; 1954; 1958; 1962; 1966; 1970; 1974; 1978; 1982; 1986; 1990; 1994; 1998; 2002; 2006; 2010; 2014; 2018; 2022; 2026; 2030

Other related appearances
- British North Borneo (1958, 1962); Sarawak (1958, 1962)

Malaysia competed in the 1978 Commonwealth Games held in Edmonton, Alberta, Canada from 3 to 12 August 1978.

== Medal summary ==
=== Medals by sport ===
Sport	Gold	Silver	Bronze	Total	Rank
Badminton	1	2	1	4	2
Total	1	2	1	4	12

=== Medallists ===
Medal	Name	Sport	Event
Gold	Sylvia Ng	Badminton	Women's singles
Silver	Moo Foot Lian; Ong Teong Boon	Badminton	Men's doubles
Silver	Katherine Teh	Badminton	Women's singles
Bronze	Abu Bakar Sufian; James Selvaraj; Katherine Teh; Moo Foot Lian; Ong Teong Boon; Saw Swee Leong; Sylvia Ng; Whee Chee Geok	Badminton	Mixed team

== Athletics ==
Men
Track and road events

Athlete	Event	Heat		Semifinal		Final	
Athlete	Event	Time	Rank	Time	Rank	Time	Rank
Ishtiaq Mubarak	110 m hurdles	14.89	6	—N/a		did not advance	
Simit Bolkiah	400 m hurdles	54.36	6 Q	did not start		did not advance	
Vellasamy Subramaniam	30 km walk	—N/a				2:56:08	12

Field event

Athlete	Event	Final	
Athlete	Event	Distance	Rank
Baljit Singh Sidhu	High jump	2.05	7

Women
Track events

Athlete	Event	Heat		Semifinal		Final	
Athlete	Event	Time	Rank	Time	Rank	Time	Rank
Marina Chin Leng Sim	100 m	12.85	7	did not advance			
Marina Chin Leng Sim	100 m hurdles	14.77	6	—N/a		did not advance	

Key

- Note–Ranks given for track events are within the athlete's heat only
- Q = Qualified for the next round
- q = Qualified for the next round as a fastest loser or, in field events, by position without achieving the qualifying target
- NR = National record
- N/A = Round not applicable for the event
- Bye = Athlete not required to compete in round

== Badminton ==
Athlete	Event	Round of 64	Round of 32	Round of 16	Quarterfinal	Semifinal	Final	Rank
Athlete	Event	Opposition Score	Opposition Score	Opposition Score	Opposition Score	Opposition Score	Opposition Score	Rank
Abu Bakar Sufian	Men's singles	W	W	L	did not advance			
James Selvaraj	Men's singles	W	W	L	did not advance			
Moo Foot Lian	Men's singles	W	W	L	did not advance			
Saw Swee Leong	Men's singles	W	W	W	W	W	Bronze medal match Ray Stevens (ENG); L	4
Abu Bakar Sufian; James Selvaraj	Men's doubles	—N/a	W	W	L	did not advance		
Moo Foot Leong; Ong Teong Boon	Men's doubles	—N/a	W	W	W	W	Gold medal match Ray Stevens; Mike Tredgett (ENG); L	2nd place, silver medalist(s)
Chee Geok Whee	Women's singles	W	L	did not advance				
Katherine Teh Swee Phek	Women's singles	W	W	W	W	W	Gold medal match Sylvia Ng Meow Eng (MAS); L	2nd place, silver medalist(s)
Sylvia Ng Meow Eng	Women's singles	W	W	W	W	W	Gold medal match Sylvia Ng Meow Eng (MAS); W	1st place, gold medalist(s)
Katherine Teh Swee Phek; Sylvia Ng Meow Eng	Women's doubles	—N/a		W	L	did not advance		
Ong Teong Boon; Chee Geok Whee	Mixed doubles	W	L	did not advance				
James Selvaraj; Katherine Teh Swee Phek	Mixed doubles	W	W	L	did not advance			
Abu Bakar Sufian; Chee Geok Whee; James Selvaraj; Katherine Teh Swee Phek; Moo Foot Lian; Ong Teong Boon; Sylvia Ng Meow Eng	Mixed team	—N/a		W	W	W	Bronze medal match New Zealand; W	3rd place, bronze medalist(s)

== Shooting ==
Men

Athlete	Event	Final	
Athlete	Event	Points	Rank
Abdul Rahman	50 m rifle prone	1155	27
Felix Choong Huen Ho	Rapid fire pistol	0	20
Ally Ong	Skeet	182	8
Edmund Yong	Skeet	167	13

== Swimming ==
Women

Athlete	Event	Final	
Athlete	Event	Time	Rank
Christine Lam	400 m freestyle	4:52.02	11
Christine Lam	800 m freestyle	9:56.94	9
Rosanna Lam Ai Leng	100 m breaststroke	1:23.35	17
Rosanna Lam Ai Leng	200 m breaststroke	3:00.86	13
Christine Lam	100 m butterfly	1:11.63	15
Christine Lam	200 m butterfly	2:38.55	14
Rosanna Lam Ai Leng	200 m individual medley	2:42.12	13

== Weightlifting ==
Men

Athlete	Event	Military press		Snatch		Clean & jerk		Total	Rank
Athlete	Event	Result	Rank	Result	Rank	Result	Rank	Total	Rank
Leong Ah Wah	56 kg							197.5	5
