= Mazlan Hamzah =

Malaysian sprinter

Personal information
- Nationality: Malaysian

Sport
- Sport: Sprinting
- Event: 4 × 100 metres relay

Mazlan Hamzah is a Malaysian sprinter. He competed in the men's 4 × 100 metres relay at the 1964 Summer Olympics.
