= Ricky Teh =

Malaysian sport shooter (born 1963)

Chee Fei (born 19 May 1963), also known as Ricky Teh, is a Malaysian sport shooter from Selangor. He competed in the men's skeet shooting event at the 2004 Summer Olympics, and came in 40th place. Teh also competed in the 2006 Asian Games record for the skeet event.
