= Tay Li Leng =

Malaysian swimmer (1982–2023)

Personal information
- Born: 13 February 1982
- Died: 19 June 2023 (aged 41)

Sport
- Sport: Swimming

Tay Li Leng (13 February 1982 – 19 June 2023) was a Malaysian swimmer. She competed in the women's 100 metre breaststroke event at the 1996 Summer Olympics.
