= Kaw Fun Ying =

Malaysian sports shooter

Personal information
- Nationality: Malaysian
- Born: 10 December 1956 (age 68)

Sport
- Sport: Sports shooting

Kaw Fun Ying (born 10 December 1956) is a Malaysian sports shooter. He competed at the 1992 Summer Olympics and the 1996 Summer Olympics.
