= Peniamina Percival =

Samoan judoka (born 1994)

Personal information
- Nationality: Samoan and American
- Born: 8 November 1994 (age 31) Moto'otua, Samoa

Sport
- Country: Samoa
- Sport: Judo
Medal record
Men's Judo
Representing Samoa
Pacific Games
Bronze medal – third place	2019 Apia	-81kg

Peniamina Percival (born 8 November 1994) is a judoka from Samoa. He competed at the 2020 Summer Olympics, in the Judo – Men's 81 kg. His coach at the olympics was his brother Iosefa Percival. He trains at a local Dojo in Osaka and Tenri University judo club.

== Early and personal life ==
Percival is from Tiapapata in Apia and was born to a Samoan father and American mother. He attended Brandeis University in Waltham, Massachusetts where he studied environmental studies and international studies. Prior to that he had begun judo aged 13. In 2016 he had a semester in Japan and obtained his first judo black belt. He sells traditional handmade bonecarvings, and also is a music producer and DJ for the Original Samoan Krump Kingz, by the name of 685 Metal.

He won a bronze medal at the 2019 Pacific Games in Apia.
