= Cheah Tong Kim =

Malaysian swimmer (born 1945)

Personal information
- Born: 29 July 1945 (age 80)

Sport
- Sport: Swimming

Cheah Tong Kim (born 29 July 1945) is a Malaysian former swimmer. He competed in two events at the 1964 Summer Olympics.
