= Amir Daniel Abdul Majeed =

Malaysian judoka (born 2004)

Personal information
- Full name: Amir Daniel bin Abdul Majeed
- Born: 18 October 2004 (age 21)
- Occupation: Judoka

Sport
- Country: Malaysia
- Sport: Judo
- Weight class: ‍–‍81 kg

Achievements and titles
- Asian Champ.: R16 (2024, 2025)
- Commonwealth Games: (gold) (2026)
Medal record
Men's judo
Representing Malaysia
Commonwealth Games
Gold medal – first place	2026 Glasgow	‍–‍81 kg
Bronze medal – third place	2022 Birmingham	‍–‍73 kg
SEA Games
Gold medal – first place	2025 Thailand	‍–‍81 kg
Bronze medal – third place	2021 Hanoi	‍–‍73 kg
Bronze medal – third place	2023 Phnom Penh	‍–‍73 kg

Profile at external databases
- IJF: 54989
- JudoInside.com: 140668
- Updated on 2 August 2026

Amir Daniel bin Abdul Majeed (born 18 October 2004) is a Malaysian judoka.

== Career ==
In December 2025, Amir competed at the 2025 SEA Games and won a gold medal in the –81 kg category. This was Malaysia's first judo gold medal at the SEA Games in 44 years.

In August 2026, he competed at the 2026 Commonwealth Games and won a gold medal in the –‍81 kg category. This was Malaysia's first gold medal in judo at the Commonwealth Games.
