= Leong Chim Seong =

Malaysian weightlifter

Personal information
- Nationality: Malaysian
- Born: 1 November 1940 (age 85)

Sport
- Sport: Weightlifting

Leong Chim Seong (born 1 November 1940) is a Malaysian weightlifter. He competed at the 1964 Summer Olympics and the 1968 Summer Olympics.
