= Murugayan Kumaresan =

Malaysian cyclist (born 1967)

Personal information
- Born: 13 January 1967 (age 59) Batu Pahat, Johor, Malaysia

Cycling career
- Sport: Cycling

Murugayan Kumaresan (born 13 January 1967) is a retired track cyclist from Malaysia, who represented his country at the 1988 Summer Olympics and the 1992 Summer Olympics.
