= Thong Saw Pak =

Singaporean weightlifter (1924–2015)

Personal information
- Nationality: Singaporean
- Born: 20 July 1924
- Died: 4 October 2015 (aged 91); England

Sport
- Sport: Weightlifting

Thong Saw Pak (20 July 1924 – 4 October 2015) was a Singaporean weightlifter. He competed in the men's lightweight event at the 1952 Summer Olympics. Thong died in England on 4 October 2015, at the age of 91.
