= Chung Kum Weng =

Malaysian weightlifter (1934–2025)

Personal information
- Nationality: Malaysian / British (Welsh)
- Born: 12 May 1934 Ipoh, Perak, Federated Malay States, British Malaya
- Died: February 2025 (aged 90) Cardiff, Wales
- Height: 167 cm (5 ft 6 in)
- Weight: 60 kg (132 lb)

Sport
- Sport: Weightlifting
Medal record
Men's weightlifting
Commonwealth Games
Representing Wales
| Gold medal – first place | 1966 Kingston | Featherweight |
Representing Malaya
| Silver medal – second place | 1958 Cardiff | Featherweight |

Chung Kum Weng (12 May 1934 – February 2025) was a Malaysian weightlifter who competed at two Olympic Games and won Commonwealth Games gold.

== Biography ==
Chung won silver at the 1958 British Empire and Commonwealth Games in the featherweight class, where he represented Malaysia.

He competed for Malaysia at the 1960 Summer Olympics and the 1964 Summer Olympics.

He represented the 1966 Welsh team at the 1966 British Empire and Commonwealth Games in Kingston, Jamaica, participating in the featherweight class, winning the gold medal.

Chung died in Cardiff, Wales, in February 2025, at the age of 90.
