= Olympic Council of Malaysia =

National Olympic Committee

- Country: Malaysia
- Code: MAS
- Created: 1953
- Recognized: 1954
- Continental Association: OCA
- Headquarters: Mezzanine Floor, Wisma OCM, Jalan Hang Jebat, 50150 Kuala Lumpur, Malaysia
- President: Mohamad Norza Zakaria
- Secretary General: Nazifuddin Najib
- Website: www.olympic.org.my

The Olympic Council of Malaysia (Malay: Majlis Olimpik Malaysia; IOC code: MAS), or commonly OCM or MOM, is the National Olympic Committee representing Malaysia. It is also the body responsible for Malaysia's representation at the Commonwealth Games, as Commonwealth Games Malaysia.

== History ==
The body was founded in 1953 as the Federation of Malaya Olympic Council (FMOC). The FMOC received its recognition as the National Olympic Committee of the Federation of Malaya in May 1954. On 16 September 1963, Singapore and the British crown colonies of North Borneo and Sarawak joined the Federation of Malaya to form Malaysia. On 5 May 1964, the Singapore Olympic and Sports Council, the Sarawak Sports Olympic Committee and the Sabah Olympic Committee and the FMOC was merged to form the Olympic Council of Malaysia. On 9 August 1965, Singapore ceased to be part of Malaysia and re-established its own National Olympic Committee.

== List of presidents ==
- 1955-1960: E. M. McDonald
- 1960 -1970:Henry Lee Hau Shik
- 1970 -1976: Abdul Razak Hussein
- 1976–1998: Hamzah Abu Samah
- 1998–2018: Tunku Imran
- 2018–Present: Mohamad Norza Zakaria

== See also ==
- Malaysia at the Olympics
- Malaysia at the Youth Olympics
- Malaysia at the Commonwealth Games
- Paralympic Council of Malaysia
