= Australia at the 1998 Commonwealth Games =

- CG code: AUS
- CGA: Australian Commonwealth Games Association
- Website: commonwealthgames.org.au

in Kuala Lumpur, Malaysia
- Competitors: 311
- Flag bearers: Opening: Kieren Perkins; Closing:
- Officials: 130
- Medals Ranked 1st: Gold 80 Silver 61 Bronze 57 Total 198

Commonwealth Games appearances (overview)
- 1930; 1934; 1938; 1950; 1954; 1958; 1962; 1966; 1970; 1974; 1978; 1982; 1986; 1990; 1994; 1998; 2002; 2006; 2010; 2014; 2018; 2022; 2026; 2030

Australia at the 1998 Commonwealth Games was abbreviated AUS. This was their sixteenth of 16 Commonwealth Games having participated in all Games meets up to these Games. The games took place in Kuala Lumpur, between the 11th - 21 September. Australia placed first, winning a total of 198, with 311 competitors.

== Medals ==
Medal	Name	Sport	Event
Gold	Nick A'hern	Athletics	Men's 20 km walk
Gold	Peter Burge	Athletics	Men's long jump
Gold	Stuart Rendell	Athletics	Men's hammer throw
Gold	Jagan Hames	Athletics	Men's decathlon
Gold	Nova Maree Peris-Kneebone	Athletics	Women's 200 m
Gold	Kate Anderson-Richardson	Athletics	Women's 5000 m
Gold	Heather Turland	Athletics	Women's marathon
Gold	Jane Saville	Athletics	Women's 10 km walk
Gold	Tania Van Heer; Lauren Hewitt; Nova Maree Peris-Kneebone; Sharon Cripps	Athletics	Women's 4 × 100 m relay
Gold	Susan Andrews; Tamsyn Lewis; Lee Naylor; Tania van Heer	Athletics	Women's 4 × 400 m relay
Gold	Emma George	Athletics	Women's pole vault
Gold	Deborah Sosimenko	Athletics	Women's hammer throw
Gold	Louise McPaul	Athletics	Women's javelin throw
Gold	Brett Duprez; Mark Jacobsen	Bowls	Men's pairs
Gold	Darryn Hill	Cycling	Men's sprint
Gold	Shane Kelly	Cycling	Men's 1000 m time trial
Gold	Brad McGee	Cycling	Men's individual pursuit
Gold	Brad McGee; Brett Lancaster; Luke Roberts; Michael Rogers; Timothy Lyons	Cycling	Men's team pursuit
Gold	Michael Rogers	Cycling	Men's scratch race
Gold	Jay Sweet	Cycling	Men's road race
Gold	Alayna Burns	Cycling	Women's scratch race
Gold	Anna Wilson	Cycling	Women's road time trial
Gold	Trudy McIntosh	Gymnastics	Women's beam
Gold	Shannon Roy	Diving	Men's 3 m springboard
Gold	Chantelle Michell	Diving	Women's 1 m springboard
Gold	Vyninka Arlow	Diving	Women's 10 m platform
Gold	Lisa Skinner	Gymnastics	Women's uneven bars
Gold	Zeena McLaughlin	Gymnastics	Women's individual allround
Gold	Allana Slater; Katarina Frketic; Lisa Skinner; Trudy McIntosh; Zeena McLaughlin	Gymnastics	Women's team
Gold	Andrei Kravtsov	Gymnastics	Men's floor
Gold	Andrei Kravtsov	Gymnastics	Men's parallel bars
Gold	Andrei Kravtsov	Gymnastics	Men's pommel horse
Gold	Andrei Kravtsov	Gymnastics	Men's individual all round
Gold	Pavel Mamine	Gymnastics	Men's rings
Gold	Australia men's national field hockey team: Michael Brennan Adam Commens Stephen Davies Damon Diletti Jason Duff James Elmer Paul Gaudoin Mark Hickman Jeremy Hiskins Stephen Holt Brent Livermore Matthew Smith Daniel Sproule Jay Stacy Lachlan Vivian-Taylor Michael York	Hockey	Men's team
Gold	Australia women's national field hockey team: Alison Peek Alyson Annan Bianca Langham Claire Mitchell-Taverner Juliet Haslam Justine Sowry Kate Starre Katie Allen Katrina Powell Kristen Towers Lisa Powell Louise Dobson Michelle Andrews Nikki Mott Rachel Imison Rechelle Hawkes	Hockey	Women's team
Gold	Australia national netball team: Carissa Tombs Liz Ellis Jenny Borlase Janine Ilitch Kathryn Harby-Williams Nicole Cusack Rebecca Sanders Simone McKinnis Shelley O'Donnell Sarah Sutter Sharelle McMahon Vicki Wilson	Netball	Women's team
Gold	Michelle Martin	Squash	Women's singles
Gold	Michelle Martin; Craig Rowland	Squash	Mixed doubles
Gold	Annemarie Forder	Shooting	Women's 10 m air pistol individual
Gold	Annemarie Forder; Christine Trefry	Shooting	Women's 10 m air pistol pairs
Gold	Christine Trefry	Shooting	Women's 25 m sport pistol individual
Gold	Christine Trefry; Annette Woodward	Shooting	Women's 25 m sport pistol pairs
Gold	Michael Diamond	Shooting	Men's trap
Gold	Mike Giustiniano; Pat Murray	Shooting	Men's 25 m rapid fire pistol pairs
Gold	Timothy Lowndes	Shooting	Men's 50 m rifle three positions individual
Gold	Carrie Quigley; Kim Frazer	Shooting	Women's 50 m rifle prone pairs
Gold	Susan McCready	Shooting	Women's 50 m rifle three positions individual
Gold	Michael Klim	Swimming	Men's 100 m freestyle
Gold	Ian Thorpe	Swimming	Men's 200 m freestyle
Gold	Ian Thorpe	Swimming	Men's 400 m freestyle
Gold	Grant Hackett	Swimming	Men's 1500 m freestyle
Gold	Simon Cowley	Swimming	Men's 100 m breaststroke
Gold	Simon Cowley	Swimming	Men's 200 m breaststroke
Gold	Geoff Huegill	Swimming	Men's 100 m butterfly
Gold	Trent Steed	Swimming	Men's 400 m individual medley
Gold	Matthew Dunn	Swimming	Men's 200 m individual medley
Gold	Ashley Callus; Chris Fydler; Ian Thorpe; Michael Klim	Swimming	Men's 4 × 100 m freestyle relay
Gold	Daniel Kowalski; Ian Thorpe; Matthew Dunn; Michael Klim	Swimming	Men's 4 × 200 m freestyle relay
Gold	Josh Watson; Geoff Huegill; Simon Cowley; Michael Klim; Adrian Radley - heat Chris Fydler - heat	Swimming	Men's 4 × 100 m medley relay
Gold	Susie O'Neill	Swimming	Women's 200 m freestyle
Gold	Susie O'Neill	Swimming	Women's 400 m freestyle
Gold	Rachel Harris	Swimming	Women's 800 m freestyle
Gold	Giaan Rooney	Swimming	Women's 100 m backstroke
Gold	Helen Denman	Swimming	Women's 100 m breaststroke
Gold	Samantha Riley	Swimming	Women's 200 m breaststroke
Gold	Petria Thomas	Swimming	Women's 100m butterfly
Gold	Susie O'Neill	Swimming	Women's 200 m butterfly
Gold	Lori Munz; Rebecca Creedy; Sarah Ryan; Susie O'Neill	Swimming	Women's 4 × 100 m freestyle relay
Gold	Anna Windsor; Julia Greville; Lori Munz; Susie O'Neill	Swimming	Women's 4 × 200 m freestyle relay
Gold	Giaan Rooney; Helen Denman; Petria Thomas; Susie O'Neill	Swimming	Women's 4 × 100 m medley relay
Gold	Cara Honeychurch	Tenpin bowling	Women's singles
Gold	Cara Honeychurch; Maxine Nabel	Tenpin bowling	Women's doubles
Gold	Cara Honeychurch; Frank Ryan	Tenpin bowling	Mixed doubles
Gold	Mehmey Yagci	Weightlifting	Men's 56 kg snatch
Gold	Damian Brown	Weightlifting	Men's 77 kg clean and jerk
Gold	Damian Brown	Weightlifting	Men's 77 kg combined
Gold	Kiril Kounev	Weightlifting	Men's 94 kg snatch
Gold	Kiril Kounev	Weightlifting	Men's 94 kg combined
Gold	Kiril Kounev	Weightlifting	Men's 94 kg clean and jerk
Silver	Rohan Robinson	Athletics	Men's 400 m hurdles
Silver	Duane Cousins	Athletics	Men's 50 km walk
Silver	Paul Burgess	Athletics	Men's pole vault
Silver	Jai Taurima	Athletics	Men's long jump
Silver	Scott Ferrier	Athletics	Men's decathlon
Silver	Kylie Risk	Athletics	Women's 10000 m
Silver	Lisa Dick	Athletics	Women's marathon
Silver	Kerry Saxby-Junna	Athletics	Women's 10 km walk
Silver	Lisa-Marie Vizaniari	Athletics	Women's discus throw
Silver	Jane Jamieson	Athletics	Women's heptathlon
Silver	Adam Jeffery; Kevin Walsh; Rex Johnston; Stewart Davies	Bowls	Men's fours
Silver	Lee Poletti; Karen Murphy; Margaret Sumner; Marilyn Peddell	Bowls	Women's fours
Silver	Australia national cricket team: Steve Waugh(c) Mark Waugh (vc) Michael Bevan Andy Bichel Damien Fleming Adam Gilchrist Brendon Julian Michael Kasprowicz Darren Lehmann Damien Martyn Tom Moody Ricky Ponting Gavin Robertson Brad Young	Cricket	Men's team
Silver	Sean Eadie	Cycling	Men's sprint
Silver	Luke Roberts	Cycling	Men's individual pursuit
Silver	Stuart O'Grady	Cycling	Men's road time trial
Silver	Michelle Ferris	Cycling	Women's sprint
Silver	Alayna Burns	Cycling	Women's individual pursuit
Silver	Dean Pullar	Diving	Men's 1 m springboard
Silver	Dean Pullar	Diving	Men's 3 m springboard
Silver	Robert Newbery	Diving	Men's 10 m platform
Silver	Chantelle Michell	Diving	Women's 3 m springboard
Silver	Zeena McLaughlin	Gymnastics	Women's beam
Silver	Allana Slater	Gymnastics	Women's floor
Silver	Trudy McIntosh	Gymnastics	Women's vault
Silver	Allana Slater	Gymnastics	Women's individual allround
Silver	Andrei Kravtsov; Brennon Dowrick; Bret Hudson; Pavel Mamine; Philippe Rizzo	Gymnastics	Men's team
Silver	Shaneez Johnston	Gymnastics	Women's rhythmic clubs
Silver	Shaneez Johnston	Gymnastics	Women's rhythmic ribbon
Silver	Leigh Marning	Gymnastics	Women's rhythmic rope
Silver	Leigh Marning	Gymnastics	Women's rhythmic individual allround
Silver	Christine Trefry	Shooting	Women's 10m air pistol individual
Silver	Belinda Muehlberg; Noemi Rostas	Shooting	Women's 10 m air rifle pairs
Silver	David Moore; Bruce Quick	Shooting	Men's 50 m free pistol pairs
Silver	Michael Diamond; Ben Kelley	Shooting	Men's trap pairs
Silver	Les Imgrund; Timothy Lowndes	Shooting	Men's 50m rifle three positions pairs
Silver	Carrie Quigley	Shooting	Women's 50m rifle prone individual
Silver	Sarah Fitz-Gerald	Squash	Women's singles
Silver	Robyn Cooper; Rachael Grinham	Squash	Women's doubles
Silver	Byron Davis; Rodney Eyles	Squash	Men's doubles
Silver	Chris Fydler	Swimming	Men's 100 m freestyle
Silver	Michael Klim	Swimming	Men's 200 m freestyle
Silver	Grant Hackett	Swimming	Men's 400 m freestyle
Silver	Josh Watson	Swimming	Men's 100 m backstroke
Silver	Adrian Radley	Swimming	Men's 200 m backstroke
Silver	Phil Rogers	Swimming	Men's 100 m breaststroke
Silver	Ryan Mitchell	Swimming	Men's 200 m breaststroke
Silver	Adam Pine	Swimming	Men's 100 m butterfly
Silver	Bill Kirby	Swimming	Men's 200 m butterfly
Silver	Susie O'Neill	Swimming	Women's 100 m freestyle
Silver	Meredith Smith	Swimming	Women's 200 m backstroke
Silver	Samantha Riley	Swimming	Women's 100 m breaststroke
Silver	Susie O'Neill	Swimming	Women's 100 m butterfly
Silver	Petria Thomas	Swimming	Women's 200 m butterfly
Silver	Naomi Young	Synchronised swimming	Women's solo
Silver	Irena Olevsky; Naomi Young	Synchronised swimming	Women's duet
Silver	Maxine Nabel	Tenpin bowling	Women's singles
Silver	Yurik Sarkisyan	Weightlifting	Men's 62 kg snatch
Silver	Yurik Sarkisyan	Weightlifting	Men's 62 kg clean and jerk
Silver	Yurik Sarkisyan	Weightlifting	Men's 62 kg combined
Silver	Chris Rae	Weightlifting	Men's 105+ kg combined
Bronze	Steve Moneghetti	Athletics	Men's 10000 m
Bronze	Nathan Deakes	Athletics	Men's 20km walk
Bronze	Dominic McGrath	Athletics	Men's 50 km walk
Bronze	Gavin Hunter; Darryl Wohlsen; Stephen Brimacombe; Matt Shirvington; Rodney Zuyderwyk - heat	Athletics	Men's 4 × 100 m relay
Bronze	Tim Forsyth	Athletics	Men's high jump
Bronze	Tania Van Heer	Athletics	Women's 100 m
Bronze	Lauren Hewitt	Athletics	Women's 200 m
Bronze	Clair Fearnley	Athletics	Women's 10000 m
Bronze	Alison Inverarity	Athletics	Women's high jump
Bronze	Nicole Boegman	Athletics	Women's long jump
Bronze	Alison Lever	Athletics	Women's discus throw
Bronze	Peter Blackburn; Rhonda Cator	Badminton	Mixed doubles
Bronze	Rhonda Cator; Amanda Hardy; Rayoni Head; Sarah Hicks; Kellie Lucas; Kate Wilson-Smith	Badminton	Women's team
Bronze	Gordana Baric; Willow Fong	Bowls	Women's pairs
Bronze	James Swan	Boxing	Men's featherweight
Bronze	Casey Jones	Boxing	Men's light welterweight
Bronze	Lynden Hosking	Boxing	Men's welterweight
Bronze	Justin Whitehead	Boxing	Men's super heavyweight
Bronze	Joshua Kersten	Cycling	Men's 1000m time trial
Bronze	Kathy Watt	Cycling	Women's road time trial
Bronze	Anna Wilson	Cycling	Women's road race
Bronze	Robert Newbery	Diving	Men's 1 m springboard
Bronze	Zeena McLaughlin	Gymnastics	Women's floor
Bronze	Zeena McLaughlin	Gymnastics	Women's uneven bars
Bronze	Trudy McIntosh	Gymnastics	Women's individual allround
Bronze	Bret Hudson	Gymnastics	Men's parallel bars
Bronze	Bret Hudson	Gymnastics	Men's vault
Bronze	Brennon Dowrick	Gymnastics	Men's pommel horse
Bronze	Brennon Dowrick	Gymnastics	Men's individual allround
Bronze	Leigh Marning	Gymnastics	Women's rhythmic hoop
Bronze	Shaneez Johnston	Gymnastics	Women's rhythmic individual allround
Bronze	Danielle Le Ray; Kristy Darrah; Leigh Marning; Shaneez Johnston	Gymnastics	Women's rhythmic team
Bronze	Australia national rugby sevens team: Brendan Williams Cameron Pither David Campese Ipolito Fenukitau Jim Williams Marc Stcherbina Matthew Dowling Richard Graham Rick Nalatu Tyron Mandrusiak	Rugby sevens	Men's team
Bronze	Zlatko Beneta	Shooting	Men's 10 m air rifle individual
Bronze	Mike Giustiniano; Bruce Quick	Shooting	Men's 25 m centre-fire pistol pairs
Bronze	Bruce Quick	Shooting	Men's 50 m free pistol individual
Bronze	David Cunningham	Shooting	Men's skeet
Bronze	Timothy Lowndes; Warren Potent	Shooting	Men's 50 m rifle prone pairs
Bronze	Sarah Fitz-Gerald; Carol Owens	Squash	Women's doubles
Bronze	Michael Klim	Swimming	Men's 50 m freestyle
Bronze	Daniel Kowalski	Swimming	Men's 200 m freestyle
Bronze	Daniel Kowalski	Swimming	Men's 400 m freestyle
Bronze	Kieren Perkins	Swimming	Men's 1500 m freestyle
Bronze	Michael Klim	Swimming	Men's 100 m butterfly
Bronze	Robert van der Zant	Swimming	Men's 200 m individual medley
Bronze	Zane King	Swimming	Men's 400 m individual medley
Bronze	Rebecca Creedy	Swimming	Women's 100 m freestyle
Bronze	Meredith Smith	Swimming	Women's 100 m backstroke
Bronze	Kathryn Godfrey	Swimming	Women's 100 m butterfly
Bronze	Jennifer Reilly	Swimming	Women's 400 m individual medley
Bronze	Michael Muir; Frank Ryan	Tenpin bowling	Men's doubles
Bronze	Damian Brown	Weightlifting	Men's 77 kg snatch
Bronze	Simon Heffernan	Weightlifting	Men's 94 kg snatch
Bronze	Simon Heffernan	Weightlifting	Men's 94 kg clean and jerk
Bronze	Simon Heffernan	Weightlifting	Men's 94 kg combined
Bronze	Chris Rae	Weightlifting	Men's 105+ kg snatch
Bronze	Chris Rae	Weightlifting	Men's 105+ kg clean and jerk

Medals by sport
Sport	1st place, gold medalist(s)	2nd place, silver medalist(s)	3rd place, bronze medalist(s)	
Swimming	23	14	11	48
Athletics	13	10	11	34
Gymnastics	9	9	10	28
Shooting	9	6	5	20
Cycling	8	5	3	16
Weightlifting	6	4	6	16
Diving	3	4	1	8
Tenpin bowling	3	1	1	5
Squash	2	3	1	6
Hockey	2	0	0	2
Lawn bowls	1	2	1	4
Netball	1	0	0	1
Cricket	0	1	0	1
Synchronised swimming	0	2	0	2
Boxing	0	0	4	4
Badminton	0	0	2	2
Rugby sevens	0	0	1	1
Total	80	61	57	198

== Sport Debuts ==
The 1998 commonwealth games was the first games that tea sports were played. Australia debuted teams in cricket, rugby sevens, hockey, and netball.

The 1998 games have been the only games which cricket has been played. Australia won a silver medal, losing gold to South Africa. Australia won a bronze medal in Rugby Sevens, defeating Samoa in the playoff. The gold and silver medals were lost to New Zealand and Fiji respectively. The Australian men's hockey team won gold, defeating Malaysia in the finals and the women's team won gold, defeating England in the finals. Australia won gold in the netball final against New Zealand, this was one of the first major netball tournaments that Australia took part in.

== Results by event ==
=== Athletics ===
Men
Track and Road Events

Athlete	Event	Heat	Quarterfinal	Semifinal	Final	Rank
Damien Marsh	100 m	10.06	DNS	Did not qualify		32
Matthew Shirvington	100 m	10.24	10.13	10.12	10.03	4
Gavin Hunter	100 m	10.40	10.38	10.49	Did not qualify	15
Stephen Brimacombe	200 m	20.68	20.77	20.80	Did not qualify	11
Darryl Wohlsen	200 m	20.68	20.84	20.59	20.48	5
Matthew Shirvington	200 m	20.96	20.78	20.55	20.53	6
Declan Stack	400 m	47.18	46.63	Did not qualify		21
Patrick Dwyer	400 m	46.58	45.71	46.12	Did not qualify	13
Casey Vincent	400 m	47.04	46.03	Did not qualify		17
Joseph Ischia	800 m	1:48.61	—N/a	1:48.58	Did not qualify	13
Shaun Creighton	5000 m	14:23.38	—N/a		DNS	15
Lee Troop	5000 m	14:09.68	—N/a		13:56.32	6
Stephen Moneghetti	10000 m	—N/a			29:03.2	3rd place, bronze medalist(s)
Lee Troop	10000 m	—N/a			29:34.23	7
Kyle Vander-Kuyp	110 m hurdles	13.63	—N/a		13.67	5
Rod Zuyderwyk	110 m hurdles	14.09	—N/a		Did not qualify	10
Declan Stack	400 m hurdles	47.18	46.63	Did not qualify		21
Patrick Dwyer	400 m hurdles	46.58	45.71	46.12	Did not qualify	13
Casey Vincent	400 m hurdles	47.04	46.03	Did not qualify		17
Christopher Unthank	3000 m steeplechase	—N/a			8:37.24	5
Brent Vallance	20 km Walk	—N/a			1:36:29	14
Nicholas A'Hern	20 km Walk	—N/a			1:24:59	1st place, gold medalist(s)
Nathan Deakes	20 km Walk	—N/a			1:26:06	3rd place, bronze medalist(s)
Duane Cousins	50 km Walk	—N/a			4:20:30	2nd place, silver medalist(s)
Dominic McGrath	50 km Walk	—N/a			4:12:52	3rd place, bronze medalist(s)
Dion Russell	50 km Walk	—N/a			DNF	—N/a
Sean Quilty	Marathon	—N/a			2:24:43	11
Patrick Carroll	Marathon	—N/a			2:25:14	7
Stephen Moneghetti	Marathon	—N/a			DNS	—N/a

Field Events

Athlete	Event	Qualification	Final	Rank
Peter Burge	Long jump	8.05	8.22	1st place, gold medalist(s)
Jai Taurima	Long jump	7.80	8.22	2nd place, silver medalist(s)
Shane Hair	Long jump	7.62	7.82	4
Timothy Forsyth	High jump	—N/a	2.28	3rd place, bronze medalist(s)
Paul Burgess	Pole vault	—N/a	5.50	2nd place, silver medalist(s)
Clay Cross	Shot put	—N/a	19.15	4
Aaron Neighbour	Shot put	—N/a	18.77	6
Adrian Hatcher	Shot put	—N/a	18.44	7
Justin Anlezark	Javelin throw	—N/a	68.99	10
Andrew Currey	Javelin throw	—N/a	80.05	5
Stuart Rendell	Hammer throw	—N/a	74.71	1st place, gold medalist(s)

Combined Events - Decathlon

Athlete	Points	Rank
Jagan Hames	8,490	1st place, gold medalist(s)
Scott Ferrier	8,307	2nd place, silver medalist(s)
Peter Banks	7,859	5

Women
Track and Road Events

Athlete	Event	Heat	Semifinal	Final	Rank
Nova Peris-Kneebone	100 m	11:42	11:41	11.41	6
Lauren Hewitt	100 m	11.43	11.44	11.37	4
Tania Van-Heer	100 m	11.36	11.35	11.29	3rd place, bronze medalist(s)
Melinda Gainsford-Taylor	200 m	22.98	22.79	23.04	4
Nova Peris-Kneebone	200 m	23.15	23.05	22.77	1st place, gold medalist(s)
Lauren Hewitt	200 m	23.44	23.05	22.83	3rd place, bronze medalist(s)
Susan Andrews	400 m	52.98	52.65	Did not qualify	10
Lee Naylor	400 m	53.13	52.20	52.15	5
Tamsyn Lewis	800 m	2:02.97	2:03.56	2:01.71	6
Mandy Giblin	1500 m	—N/a		4:20.15	11
Kate Anderson	5000 m	—N/a		15:52.74	1st place, gold medalist(s)
Anne Cross	5000 m	—N/a		16:14.98	7
Kylie Risk	10000 m	—N/a		33:42.11	2nd place, silver medalist(s)
Clair-Louise Fearnley	10000 m	—N/a		33:52.13	3rd place, bronze medalist(s)
Debbie Edwards	100 m hurdles	13.31	—N/a	13.49	7
Jane Saville	10 km Walk	—N/a		43:57	1st place, gold medalist(s)
Kerry Saxby-Junna	10 km Walk	—N/a		44:27	2nd place, silver medalist(s)
Heather Turland	Marathon	—N/a		2:41:24	1st place, gold medalist(s)
Lisa Dick	Marathon	—N/a		2:41:48	2nd place, silver medalist(s)

Field Events

Athlete	Event	Qualification	Final	Rank
Nicole Boegman	Long Jump	—N/a	6.58	3rd place, bronze medalist(s)
Lisa Bruty	High Jump	—N/a	1.88	4
Alison Inverarity	High Jump	1.85	1.88	3rd place, bronze medalist(s)
Emma George	Pole Vault	—N/a	4.20	1st place, gold medalist(s)
Rachael Dacy	Pole Vault	—N/a	4.00	5
Tracey Shepherd	Pole Vault	—N/a	3.90	7
Helen Toussis	Shot Put	—N/a	15.65	6
Lisa-Marie Vizaniari	Discus Throw	—N/a	62.14	2nd place, silver medalist(s)
Alison Lever	Discus Throw	—N/a	59.80	3rd place, bronze medalist(s)
Louise McPaul	Javelin Throw	—N/a	66.96	1st place, gold medalist(s)
Joanna Stone	Javelin Throw	—N/a	Did not compete	—N/a
Deborah Sosimenko	Hammer Throw	—N/a	66.56	1st place, gold medalist(s)
Karyne Perkins	Hammer Throw	—N/a	60.65	4
Denise Passmore	Hammer Throw	—N/a	59.10	5

Combined Events - Heptathlon

Athlete	Points	Rank
Jane Jamieson	6,354	2nd place, silver medalist(s)

=== Cricket ===
The 1998 Commonwealth Games was the first and only games that cricket has been included in. Matches were 50 overs a side. Australia came second (silver) , losing the gold medal to South Africa by 4 wickets. Australia placed first in pool B, against Antigua and Barbuda, India and Canada.

Roster

- Steve Waugh (c)
- Mark Waugh (vc)
- Michael Bevan
- Glenn McGrath
- Andy Bichel
- Damien Fleming
- Adam Gilchrist (wk)
- Brendon Julian
- Michael Kasprowicz
- Darren Lehmann
- Damien Martyn
- Tom Moody
- Ricky Ponting
- Gavin Robertson
- Brad Young
- Coach: Geoff Marsh
- Manager: Steve Bernard
- Physiotherapist: Errol Alcott

Steve Waugh scored the third most runs in the tournament with 215 and Damien Fleming and Brad Young took the 1st and 3rd spots for the most wickets, 14 and 10 respectively.

Summary

Team	Event	Group stage				Semifinal	Final / BM	
Team	Event	Opposition Result	Opposition Result	Opposition Result	Rank	Opposition Result	Opposition Result	Rank
Australia men	Men's tournament	Canada; W by 9 wickets	Antigua and Barbuda; W by 7 wickets	India; W by 146 runs	1 Q	New Zealand; W by 9 wickets	South Africa; L by 4 wickets	2nd place, silver medalist(s)

Group stage

Group B
Pos	Team	Pld	W	L	T	NR	Pts	NRR
1	Australia	3	3	0	0	0	6	3.299
2	Antigua and Barbuda	3	1	1	0	1	3	0.079
3	India	3	1	1	0	1	3	−0.340
4	Canada	3	0	3	0	0	0	−2.558

Source: ESPNcricinfo

9 September 1998
10:00
Scorecard

Canada; 60 (20 overs)	v	Australia; 61/1 (14 overs)
Muneeb Diwan 14; Damien Fleming 4/21 (6 overs)		Mark Waugh 24*; Sanjayan Thuraisingam 1/14 (5 overs)

Australia won by 9 wickets
Perbadanan Kemajuan Negeri Selangor Sports Complex, Petaling Jaya
Umpires: Dave Orchard (SA) and William Smith (Sco)

- Australia won the toss and elected to field.
- Danny Ramnarais (Can) made his List A debut.
- Points: Australia 2, Canada 0.

12 September 1998
10:00
Scorecard

Antigua and Barbuda; 99 (30.1 overs)	v	Australia; 101/3 (18 overs)
Eldine Baptiste 22; Damien Fleming 5/24 (9 overs)		Adam Gilchrist 43*; Curtly Ambrose 2/29 (7 overs)

Australia won by 7 wickets
Tenaga National Sports Complex, Kuala Lumpur
Umpires: Rudi Koertzen (SA) and Saleem Badar (Pak)

- Australia won the toss and elected to field.
- Damien Fleming (Aus) took his second and final List A five-wicket haul.
- Points: Australia 2, Antigua and Barbuda 0.
- Antigua and Barbuda were eliminated as a result of this match.

15 September 1998
10:00
Scorecard

Australia; 255/5 (50 overs)	v	India; 109 (37.2 overs)
Steve Waugh 100* (102); Debashish Mohanty 3/50 (10 overs)		Ajay Jadeja 27 (40); Brad Young 4/23 (8.2 overs)

Australia won by 146 runs
Perbadanan Kemajuan Negeri Selangor Sports Complex, Petaling Jaya
Umpires: Javed Akhtar (Pak) and Russell Tiffin (Zim)

- India won the toss and elected to field.
- Amay Khurasiya was removed in stretcher after he collapsed due to dehydration while fielding. Rohan Gavaskar substituted for him. He couldn't bat during the Indian innings.
- Points: Australia 2, India 0.
- Australia qualified for the semi-finals and India were eliminated as a result of this match.

Semi-final

17 September 1998
10:00
Scorecard

New Zealand; 58 (26.4 overs)	v	Australia; 62/1 (10.5 overs)
Stephen Fleming 20 (41); Brad Young 4/4 (4 overs)		Adam Gilchrist 42* (36); Alex Tait 1/17 (5 overs)

Australia won by 9 wickets
Tenaga National Sports Complex, Kuala Lumpur
Umpires: Dave Orchard (SA) and V. K. Ramaswamy (Ind)

- Australia won the toss and elected to field.

Gold medal match

19 September 1998
10:00
Scorecard

Australia; 183 (49.3 overs)	v	South Africa; 184/6 (46 overs)
Steve Waugh 90* (109); Shaun Pollock 4/19 (9 overs)		Michael Rindel 67 (106); Darren Lehmann 3/14 (4 overs)

South Africa won by 4 wickets
Perbadanan Kemajuan Negeri Selangor Sports Complex, Petaling Jaya
Umpires: K. T. Francis (SL) and Steve Bucknor (Jam)

- South Africa won the toss and elected to field.
- The crowd of 7,532 was the largest recorded crowd for a cricket match in Malaysia.
- This marked the first championship for South Africa at an ICC global event or a global multi-sport event. However, the matches did not have ODI status.

=== Cycling ===
Road
Men

Athlete	Event	Time	Rank
Stuart O'Grady	Road Race	32:27.0	15
Matthew White	Road Race	37:32.0	29
Peter Rogers	Road Race	DNF	—N/a
Jay Sweet	Road Race	4:31:56	1st place, gold medalist(s)
Scott McGrory	Road Race	4:32:19	8
Neil Stephens	Road Race	DNF	—N/a
Stuart O'Grady	Time Trial	53:30.00	2nd place, silver medalist(s)
Matthew White	Time Trial	54:05.00	4
Peter Rogers	Time Trial	55:17.00	9

Women

Athlete	Event	Time	Rank
Anna Wilson	Road Race	24:59.0	3rd place, bronze medalist(s)
Kathryn Watt	Road Race	26:38.0	5
Juanita Feldhahn	Road Race	29:47.0	8
Elizabeth Tadich	Road Race	2:33:14.00	11
Tracey Gaudry	Road Race	2:29:41.00	7
Karen Barrow	Road Race	DNF	—N/a
Anna Wilson	Time Trail	37:34.00	1st place, gold medalist(s)
Kathryn Watt	Time Trail	38:39.00	3rd place, bronze medalist(s)
Juanita Feldhahn	Time Trail	39:55.00	7

=== Diving ===
Men

Athlete	Event	Points	Rank
Tony Lawson	10 m Platform	555.390	4
Robert Newbery	10 m Platform	605.610	2nd place, silver medalist(s)
Robert Newbery	1 m Springboard	369.150	3rd place, bronze medalist(s)
Shannon Roy	1 m Springboard	329.850	5
Dean Pullar	1 m Springboard	381.660	2nd place, silver medalist(s)
Shannon Roy	3 m Springboard	608.370	1st place, gold medalist(s)
Dean Pullar	3 m Springboard	598.140	2nd place, silver medalist(s)
Robert Newbery	3 m Springboard	564.360	5

Women

Athlete	Event	Points	Rank
Vyninka Arlow	10 m Platform	456.480	1st place, gold medalist(s)
Lynda Folauhola	10 m Platform	432.270	5
Loudy Tourky	10 m Platform	419.580	6
Chantelle Michell	1 m Springboard	271.560	1st place, gold medalist(s)
Rebecca Gilmore	1 m Springboard	239.370	4
Loudy Tourky	3 m Springboard	476.130	4
Chantelle Michell	3 m Springboard	506.520	2nd place, silver medalist(s)
Rebecca Gilmore	3 m Springboard	409.140	9

=== Gymnastics ===
Men

Athlete	Event	Points	Rank
Bret Hudson	Individual All Around	48.850	12
Andrei Kravtsov	Individual All Around	54.675	1st place, gold medalist(s)
Brennon Dowrick	Individual All Around	52.500	3rd place, bronze medalist(s)
Andrei Kravtsov	Floor	9.325	1st place, gold medalist(s)
Andrei Kravtsov	Pommel Horse	9.487	1st place, gold medalist(s)
Brennon Dowrick	Pommel Horse	9.137	3rd place, bronze medalist(s)
Pavel Mamin	Rings	9.337	1st place, gold medalist(s)
Bret Hudson	Rings	8.687	4
Bret Hudson	Vault	9.268	3rd place, bronze medalist(s)
Andrei Kravtsov	Parallel Bars	9.637	1st place, gold medalist(s)
Bret Hudson	Parallel Bars	8.887	3rd place, bronze medalist(s)
Philippe Rizzo	Horizontal Bar	8.525	5
Andrei Kravtsov	Horizontal Bar	8.662	4

Women

Athlete	Event	Points	Rank
Zeena McLaughlin	Individual All Around	37.917	1st place, gold medalist(s)
Allana Slater	Individual All Around	37.324	2nd place, silver medalist(s)
Trudy McIntosh	Individual All Around	36.636	3rd place, bronze medalist(s)
Allana Slater	Floor	9.587	2nd place, silver medalist(s)
Zeena McLaughlin	Floor	9.487	3rd place, bronze medalist(s)
Trudy McIntosh	Vault	9.162	2nd place, silver medalist(s)
Lisa Skinner	Vault	8.943	6
Lisa Skinner	Uneven Bars	9.612	1st place, gold medalist(s)
Zeena McLaughlin	Uneven Bars	9.512	3rd place, bronze medalist(s)
Zeena McLaughlin	Beam	9.375	2nd place, silver medalist(s)
Trudy McIntosh	Beam	9.550	1st place, gold medalist(s)

=== Netball ===
With a team captained by Vicki Wilson and coached by Jill McIntosh, Australia won the gold medal in the netball at the 1998 Commonwealth Games, defeating New Zealand 42–39 in the final. In the group stages, they won all five of their matches and in the semi-finals they defeated South Africa 68–38.

Group A

14 September 1998	Malaysia	17–85	Australia

15 September 1998	Australia	85–25	Canada

16 September 1998	Australia	71–36	Barbados

17 September 1998	Australia	70–38	Jamaica

18 September 1998	Australia	66–29	England

Pos	Team	P	W	D	L	GF	GA	GD	Pts
1	Australia	5	5	0	0	377	145	+232	10
2	England	5	4	0	1	257	197	+60	8
3	Jamaica	5	3	0	2	317	223	-94	6
4	Barbados	5	2	0	3	219	267	-48	4
5	Canada	5	1	0	4	195	306	-111	2
6	Malaysia	5	0	0	5	120	347	-227	0

Qualified for Semi-final 1
Qualified for Semi-final 2

Playoffs
Semi-final 1

19 September 1998	Australia	68–38	South Africa

Gold Medal Match

21 September 1998	Australia	42–39	New Zealand

Squad

Australia roster
Players
Coaches

Name	Pos	DOB	Height	Club	Nat	Caps
Jenny Borlase	GS, GA		–	Adelaide Ravens
Nicole Cusack	GA,GS		–
Liz Ellis	GK	17 January 1973 (aged 25)	1.83 m (6 ft 0 in)	Sydney Swifts
Kathryn Harby	GD, WD	16 July 1969 (aged 29)	1.79 m (5 ft 10 in)	Adelaide Thunderbirds
Janine Ilitch	GD, GK	27 January 1972 (aged 26)	1.83 m (6 ft 0 in)	Melbourne Kestrels
Simone McKinnis	WD	4 October 1965 (aged 32)	–	Melbourne Phoenix
Sharelle McMahon	GA, GS	12 August 1977 (aged 21)	1.77 m (5 ft 10 in)	Melbourne Phoenix
Shelley O'Donnell	WA, C	18 April 1967 (aged 31)	1.72 m (5 ft 8 in)	Melbourne Kestrels
Rebecca Sanders			–
Sarah Sutter			–
Carissa Tombs	C	29 November 1969 (aged 28)	1.73 m (5 ft 8 in)	Sydney Sandpipers
Vicki Wilson (c)	GA, GS, GK	11 February 1965 (aged 33)	–	Queensland Firebirds

Head coach

- Jill McIntosh

Notes

- (c) – Captain
- (cc) – Co-captain
- (vc) – Vice-captain
- – Injury / maternity leave
- (TRP) – Temporary Replacement Player

=== Rhythmic Gymnastics ===
Athlete	Event	Points	Rank
Leigh Marning	Individual All Around	37.865	2nd place, silver medalist(s)
Nareen Johnston	Individual All Around	37.673	3rd place, bronze medalist(s)
Leigh Marning	Hoop	9.500	3rd place, bronze medalist(s)
Danielle Le Ray	Hoop	9.466	4
Nareen Johnston	Clubs	9.458	2nd place, silver medalist(s)
Kristy Darrah	Clubs	9.324	4
Nareen Johnston	Ribbon	9.491	2nd place, silver medalist(s)
Kristy Darrah	Ribbon	9.350	4
Danielle Le Ray	Rope	9.358	5
Leigh Marning	Rope	9.500	2nd place, silver medalist(s)

=== Swimming ===
Men

Athlete	Event	Heat	Final	Rank
Michael Klim	50 m freestyle	22.95	22.86	3rd place, bronze medalist(s)
Nathan Rickard	50 m freestyle	23.10	22.99	4
Ashley Callus	50 m freestyle	23.01	23.03	5
Ian Thorpe	100 m freestyle	50.33	50.21	4
Christopher Fydler	100 m freestyle	50.05	49.51	2nd place, silver medalist(s)
Michael Klim	100 m freestyle	50.23	49.43 GR	1st place, gold medalist(s)
Daniel Kowalski	200 m freestyle	1:49.86	1:48.26	3rd place, bronze medalist(s)
Ian Thorpe	200 m freestyle	1:48.51	1:46.70 CR	1st place, gold medalist(s)
Michael Klim	200 m freestyle	1:50.24	1:48.05	2nd place, silver medalist(s)
Grant Hackett	400 m freestyle	3:52.56	3:44.91	2nd place, silver medalist(s)
Daniel Kowalski	400 m freestyle	3:57.36	3:48.91	3rd place, bronze medalist(s)
Ian Thorpe	400 m freestyle	3:55.20	3:44.88 GR	1st place, gold medalist(s)
Kieren Perkins	1500 m freestyle	15:34.75	15:03.00	3rd place, bronze medalist(s)
Grant Hackett	1500 m freestyle	15.19.63	14:50.92	1st place, gold medalist(s)
Daniel Kowalski	1500 m freestyle	15:43.39	15:03.40	4
Robert Van Der Zant	100 m Backstroke	57.16	57.25	8
Adrian Radley	100 m Backstroke	56.35	56.12	6
Joshua Watson	100 m Backstroke	56.73	55.92	2nd place, silver medalist(s)
Zane King	200 m Backstroke	2:04.19	2:03.20	10
Adrian Radley	200 m Backstroke	2:02.69	2:01.41	2nd place, silver medalist(s)
Joshua Watson	200 m Backstroke	2:02.55	2:01.67	4
Simon Cowley	100 m Breaststroke	1:02.35	1:02.00	1st place, gold medalist(s)
Ryan Mitchell	100 m Breaststroke	1:03.25	1:02.71	4
Philip Rogers	100 m Breaststroke	1:03.01	1:02.46	2nd place, silver medalist(s)
Simon Cowley	200 m Breaststroke	2:16.66	2:13.13	1st place, gold medalist(s)
Ryan Mitchell	200 m Breaststroke	2:16.87	2:13.20	2nd place, silver medalist(s)
Philip Rogers	200 m Breaststroke	2:18.84	2:16.37	5
Adam Pine	100 m Butterfly	53.51	53.09	2nd place, silver medalist(s)
Geoffrey Huegill	100 m Butterfly	53.34	52.81 GR}	1st place, gold medalist(s)
Michael Klim	100 m Butterfly	54.14	53.50	3rd place, bronze medalist(s)
William Kirby	200 m Butterfly	2:00.51	1:59.57	2nd place, silver medalist(s)
Zane King	200 m Butterfly	2:01.91	2:00.72	5
Ian Thorpe	200 m Butterfly	2:01.46	2:00.28	4
Trent Steed	400 m Individual Medley	4:23.13	4:19.89	1st place, gold medalist(s)
Robert Van Der Zant	400 m Individual Medley	4:28.87	4:25.72	6
Zane King	400 m Individual Medley	4:25.85	4:23.20	3rd place, bronze medalist(s)

Women

Athlete	Event	Heat	Final	Rank
Julia Greville	50 m Freestyle	27.79	Did not qualify	—N/a
Lori Munz	50 m Freestyle	26.86	26.92	10
Rebecca Creedy	50 m Freestyle	26.46	26.27	5
Susan O'Neill	100 m Freestyle	56.16	55.58	2nd place, silver medalist(s)
Sarah Ryan	100 m Freestyle	56.77	56.63	6
Rebecca Creedy	100 m Freestyle	56.61	56.07	3rd place, bronze medalist(s)
Anna Windsor	200 m Freestyle	2:03.61	2:02.97	7
Susan O'Neill	200 m Freestyle	2:02.56	2:00.24	1st place, gold medalist(s)
Julia Greville	200 m Freestyle	2:03.00	2:02.97	7
Emily Pedrazzini	400 m Freestyle	4:18.06	4:16.23	5
Susan O'Neill	400 m Freestyle	4:18.68	4:12.39	1st place, gold medalist(s)
Julia Greville	400 m Freestyle	4:14.85	4:16.07	4
Rachel Harris	800 m Freestyle	8:48.42	8:42.23	1st place, gold medalist(s)
Nadine Neumann	800 m Freestyle	8:59.93	8:55.36	8
Emily Pedrazzini	800 m Freestyle	8:52.24	8:45.24	4
Dyana Calub	100 m Backstroke	1:03.90	1:03.83	6
Meredith Smith	100 m Backstroke	1:02.92	1:03.19	3rd place, bronze medalist(s)
Giaan Rooney	100 m Backstroke	1:04.20	1:02.43 GR	1st place, gold medalist(s)
Richelle Jose	200 m Backstroke	2:18.33	1:19.73	12
Dyana Calub	200 m Backstroke	2:23.36	2:20.42	13
Meredith Smith	200 m Backstroke	2:15.70	2:13.19	2nd place, silver medalist(s)
Petria Thomas	100 m Butterfly	1:01.38	59.42 GR	1st place, gold medalist(s)
Kathryn Godfrey	100 m Butterfly	1:01.91	1:00.14	3rd place, bronze medalist(s)
Susan O'Neill	100 m Butterfly	1:00.87	59.61	2nd place, silver medalist(s)
Petria Thomas	200 m Butterfly	2:14.27	2:10.42	2nd place, silver medalist(s)
Kathryn Godfrey	200 m Butterfly	2:16.38	2:12.04	4
Susan O'Neill	200 m Butterfly	2:14.21	2:06.60 CR	1st place, gold medalist(s)
Rachel Harris	200 m Individual Medley	2:22.14		
Anna Windsor	200 m Individual Medley	2:18.14	2:16.55	4
Lori Munz	200 m Individual Medley	2:18.07	2:16.66	5
Jennifer Reilly	400 m Individual Medley	4:51.14	4:48.43	3rd place, bronze medalist(s)
Rachel Harris	400 m Individual Medley	4:51.91	4:48.95	4
Nadine Neumann	400 m Individual Medley	4:55.54	4:51.02	5

=== Synchronised Swimming ===
Athlete	Event	Points	Rank
Naomi Young	Solo	90.933	2nd place, silver medalist(s)

== See also ==
- Australia at the 1996 Summer Olympics
- Australia at the 2000 Summer Olympics
