= 1997–98 Australian Athletics Championships =

- Dates: 13–15 March 1998
- Host city: Melbourne, Australia
- Venue: Olympic Park Stadium
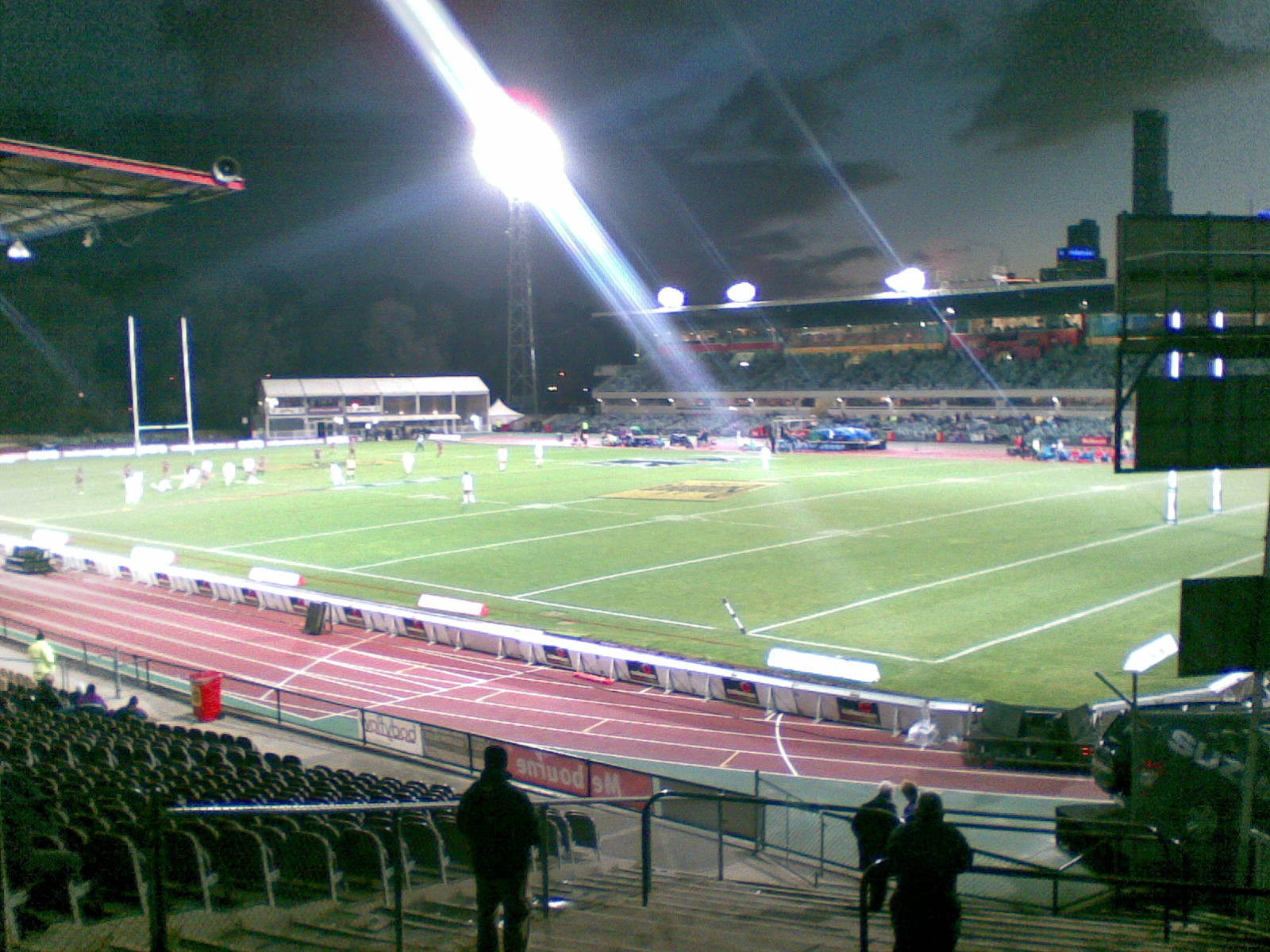

The 1997–98 Australian Athletics Championships was the 76th edition of the national championship in outdoor track and field for Australia. It was held from 13–15 March 1998 at the Olympic Park Stadium in Melbourne. It served as a selection meeting for Australia at the 1998 Commonwealth Games. The 10,000 metres event took place separately at the Zatopek 10K on 18 December 1997 at Lakeside Stadium in Melbourne. The combined track and field events were held at the Hobart Grand Prix from 20–22 February 1998.

== Medal summary ==
=== Men ===
Event	Gold		Silver		Bronze	
100 metres (Wind: -3.4 m/s)	Matt Shirvington; New South Wales	10.47	Deji Aliu; Nigeria (NGR)	10.50	Paul Henderson; New South Wales	10.68
200 metres (Wind: -2.0 m/s)	Damien Marsh; Queensland	21.34	Matt Shirvington; New South Wales	21.37	Patrick Johnson; Australian Capital Territory	21.42
400 metres	Declan Stack; Western Australia	45.55	Patrick Dwyer; New South Wales	46.44	Jason Schmidberger; Western Australia	46.77
800 metres	Noah Ngeny; Kenya (KEN)	1:46.85	Brendan Hanigan; Tasmania	1:47.00	Grant Cremer; New South Wales	1:47.12
1500 metres	Martin Keino; Kenya (KEN)	3:40.91	Hamish Christensen; New Zealand (NZL)	3:41.17	Holt Hardy; New South Wales	3:41.42
5000 metres	Shaun Creighton; Australian Capital Territory	13:24.84	Mizan Mehari; Australian Capital Territory	13:36.81	Lee Troop; Victoria	13:41.16
10,000 metres	Luke Kipkosgei; Kenya (KEN)	27:29.44	Julius Kiptoo; Kenya (KEN)	27:30.04	Robbie Johnston; New Zealand (NZL)	28:07.80
110 metres hurdles (Wind: -2.0 m/s)	Kyle Vander-Kuyp; Victoria	14.00	Kimihiro Asami; Japan (JPN)	14.40	Manabu Tomita; Japan (JPN)	14.48
400 metres hurdles	Rohan Robinson; Victoria	49.28	Zid Abou Hamed; New South Wales	49.79	Blair Young; Queensland	50.57
3000 metres steeplechase	Chris Unthank; Victoria	8:41.88	Scott Faulkner; Victoria	8:51.13	Stephen Thurston; South Australia	8:55.41
5000 metres walk	Nicholas A'Hern; New South Wales	19:12.92	Dion Russell; Victoria	19:39.62	Scott Nelson; New Zealand (NZL)	20:11.05
4 × 100 m relay	New Zealand (NZL); Nick Cowan; Chris Donaldson; Robert Bruce; Mathew Coad	40.06	New South Wales (NSW); Paul Henderson; Matt Shirvington; Kieran Noonan; Toluta'u Koula	40.25	Western Australia (WA); Sam De Vries; Rod Mapstone; Robert Colling; James Matson	40.94
4 × 400 m relay	Japan (JPN); Hideaki Kawamura; Jun Osakada; Yoshiho Terashita; Shigekazu Ōmori	3:08.12	New South Wales (NSW); Daniel Stolp; Kieran Gallagher; Matthew Beckenham; Robert Medlicott	3:09.68	Victoria (VIC); Justin Clark; Matthew Griffin; Bryce Barnwell; Mark Moresi	3:10.10
High jump	Tim Forsyth; Victoria	2.32 m	Glenn Morante; New South Wales Lee Jin-taek; South Korea (KOR)	2.10 m	Not awarded	
Pole vault	Dmitri Markov; South Australia	5.50 m	James Miller; Victoria	5.50 m	Paul Burgess; Western Australia	5.40 m
Long jump	Shane Hair; New South Wales	8.09 m (+2.2 m/s)	Jai Taurima; Queensland	7.92 m (+1.4 m/s)	Leigh Stuart; Victoria	7.81 m (+2.2 m/s)
Triple jump	Onochie Achike; Great Britain (GBR)	16.79 m (+2.1 m/s)	Andrew Murphy; New South Wales	16.19 m (+2.2 m/s)	Mohd Zaki Sadri; Malaysia (MAS)	15.86 m (+1.7 m/s)
Shot put	Justin Anlezark; Queensland	18.73 m	Clay Cross; New South Wales	18.01 m	Aaron Neighbour; Victoria	17.43 m
Discus throw	Ian Winchester; New Zealand (NZL)	58.77 m	Gerard Duffy; Australian Capital Territory	53.08 m	Chris Gaviglio; Queensland	51.02 m
Hammer throw	Stuart Rendell; Australian Capital Territory	75.15 m	Patrick Hellier; New Zealand (NZL)	66.55 m	Paul Carlin; South Australia	66.54 m
Javelin throw	Andrew Currey; New South Wales	78.46 m	Adrian Hatcher; New South Wales	76.86 m	Erin Bevans; New Zealand (NZL)	76.32 m
Decathlon	Jagan Hames; South Australia	7868 pts	Leslie Kuorikoski; Queensland	7542 pts	Matthew McEwen; Queensland	7126 pts

=== Women ===
Event	Gold		Silver		Bronze	
100 metres (Wind: -2.7 m/s)	Melinda Gainsford-Taylor; New South Wales	11.34	Nova Peris-Kneebone; Northern Territory	11.62	Lauren Hewitt; Victoria	11.68
200 metres (Wind: -2.2 m/s)	Melinda Gainsford-Taylor; New South Wales	22.53	Lauren Hewitt; Victoria	23.01	Nova Peris-Kneebone; Northern Territory	23.17
400 metres	Cathy Freeman; Victoria	51.26	Susan Andrews; Tasmania	51.55	Lee Naylor; Victoria	51.65
800 metres	Tamsyn Lewis; Victoria	2:02.93	Lynette Saint-John; Tasmania	2:03.46	Melanie Collins; Australian Capital Territory	2:04.16
1500 metres	Liz Miller; New South Wales	4:14.59	Sandra Dawson; Queensland	4:15.09	Anna Brzezińska; Poland (POL)	4:15.76
5000 metres	Anne Cross; Victoria	15:28.73	Samukeliso Moyo; Zimbabwe (ZIM)	15:46.03	Kylie Risk; Tasmania	15:46.53
10,000 metres	Natalie Harvey; Victoria	32:21.58	Kylie Risk; Tasmania	32:22.33	Clair Fearnley; Victoria	32:24.17
100 metres hurdles (Wind: -1.8 m/s)	Debbi Edwards; New South Wales	13.78	Jacquie Munro; New South Wales	13.81	Rachel Rogers; South Australia	13.90
400 metres hurdles	Stephanie Price; New South Wales	58.47	Evette Cordy; Victoria	58.83	Nicola Kidd; New Zealand (NZL)	59.75
5000 metres walk	Kerry Saxby-Junna; New South Wales	21:57.74	Jane Saville; New South Wales	22:21.79	Natalie Saville; New South Wales	22:48.54
4 × 100 m relay	South Australia (SA); Tatiana Grigorieva; Tania Van Heer; Paula Lehmann; Rachel Rogers	45.60	New South Wales (NSW); Sharon Gyselhart; Nicole Buchanan; Victoria Piggin; Elona Reinalda	45.83	Western Australia (WA); Sharon Sutherland; Jodi Lambert; Kylie Reed; Gill Ragus	46.05
4 × 400 m relay	Victoria (VIC); Jennifer Marshall; Sally Ogilvy; Lee Naylor; Tamsyn Lewis	3:38.48	New South Wales (NSW); Veronica Boyd; Kylie Watkins; Stephanie Price; Rosemary Hayward	3:38.77	Tasmania (TAS); Kirilee Buonaccorsi; Lynette Saint-John; Emily Bell; Susan Andrews	DQ
High jump	Alison Inverarity; Victoria	1.90 m	Lisa Bruty; Victoria	1.86 m	Kim Brown; New Zealand (NZL)	1.82 m
Pole vault	Emma George; Victoria	4.58 m	Tatiana Grigorieva; South Australia	4.15 m	Rachael Dacy; Victoria	3.90 m
Long jump	Nicole Boegman; New South Wales	6.81 m (+2.9 m/s)	Chantal Brunner; New Zealand (NZL)	6.65 m (+1.5 m/s)	Jane Jamieson; New South Wales	6.47 m (+1.8 m/s)
Triple jump	Connie Henry; Great Britain (GBR)	13.86 m (+0.5 m/s)	Nicole Mladenis; Western Australia	13.51 m (+1.4 m/s)	Mariklud Viduka; Victoria	13.44 m (+3.2 m/s)
Shot put	Beatrice Faumuina; New Zealand (NZL)	16.96 m	Helen Toussis; Queensland	15.97 m	Lisa-Marie Vizaniari; Queensland	15.83 m
Discus throw	Beatrice Faumuina; New Zealand (NZL)	63.80 m	Lisa-Marie Vizaniari; Queensland	61.41 m	Alison Lever; Queensland	53.90 m
Hammer throw	Deborah Sosimenko; New South Wales	66.72 m	Brenda MacNaughton; New South Wales	62.49 m	Karyne Perkins; New South Wales	60.69 m
Javelin throw	Louise McPaul; New South Wales	62.34 m	Bina Ramesh; France (FRA)	49.05 m	Cecilia McIntosh; Victoria	45.54 m
Heptathlon	Jane Jamieson; New South Wales	5943 pts	Simone Purvis; Victoria	5060 pts	Lisa Kovacs; South Australia	4767 pts
