= Athletics at the 1998 Commonwealth Games – Women's 10,000 metres =

Women's 10,000 metres at the Commonwealth Games

The women's 10,000 metres event at the 1998 Commonwealth Games was held on 17 September on National Stadium, Bukit Jalil.

== Results ==
Rank	Name	Nationality	Time	Notes
1st place, gold medalist(s)	Esther Wanjiru	Kenya	33:40.13	
2nd place, silver medalist(s)	Kylie Risk	Australia	33:42.11	
3rd place, bronze medalist(s)	Clair Fearnley	Australia	33:52.13	
4	Victoria McPherson	Scotland	34:05.11	
5	Margaret Okayo	Kenya	34:27.39	
6	Sarah Bentley	England	34:40.65	
7	Hayley Nash	Wales	35:20.14	
8	Angela Joiner	England	35:22.80	
9	Sally Goldsmith	England	36:02.11	
