= Athletics at the 1998 Commonwealth Games – Women's 5000 metres =

Women's 5000 metres at the Commonwealth Games

The women's 5000 metres event at the 1998 Commonwealth Games was held on 17 September on National Stadium, Bukit Jalil.

== Results ==
Rank	Name	Nationality	Time	Notes
1st place, gold medalist(s)	Kate Anderson	Australia	15:52.74	
2nd place, silver medalist(s)	Andrea Whitcombe	England	15:56.85	
3rd place, bronze medalist(s)	Samukeliso Moyo	Zimbabwe	15:57.57	
4	Restituta Joseph	Tanzania	15:59.15	
5	Sarah Young	England	15:59.79	
6	Hawa Hamis Hussein	Tanzania	16:01.25	
7	Anne Cross	Australia	16:14.98	
	Kathy Butler	Canada	DNF	
	Sally Barsosio	Kenya	DNS	
