= Athletics at the 1998 Commonwealth Games – Men's long jump =

Men's long jump at the Commonwealth Games

The men's long jump event at the 1998 Commonwealth Games was held 19–20 September in Kuala Lumpur.

== Medalists ==
Gold	Silver	Bronze
Peter Burge; Australia	Jai Taurima; Australia	Wendell Williams; Trinidad and Tobago

== Results ==
=== Qualification ===
Qualification: 7.90 m (Q) or at least 12 best (q) qualified for the final.

Rank	Group	Athlete	Nationality	#1	#2	#3	Result	Notes
1	A	Peter Burge	Australia	x	8.05		8.05	Q
2	B	Jai Taurima	Australia	7.80			7.80	q
3	B	Chris Wright	Bahamas	7.74	7.76		7.76	q
4	A	Mark Anthony Awere	Ghana				7.65	q
5	A	Wendell Williams	Trinidad and Tobago				7.64	q
6	A	Shane Hair	Australia				7.62	q
7	A	Richard Duncan	Canada				7.62	q
8	A	Keita Cline	British Virgin Islands				7.62	q
9	B	Steve Phillips	England	7.38	7.60		7.60	q
10	A	Stephan Louw	Namibia				7.56	q
11	A	Chris Davidson	England	7.33	7.31	7.53	7.53	q
12	B	Mohd Zaki Sadri	Malaysia	7.26	7.32	7.52	7.52	q
13	B	Aaron Langdon	New Zealand				7.50	
14	A	Danny Beauchamp	Seychelles				7.36	
15	B	Remmy Limo	Kenya				7.30	
16	B	Ralston Varlack	British Virgin Islands				7.26	
17	B	Brian Thomas	Canada				7.25	
18	B	Dwane Magloire	Saint Lucia				7.21	SB
19	A	Chai Song Lip	Malaysia				6.82	
20	B	Joseph Rodan	Fiji				6.81	
	A	Gable Garenamotse	Botswana				DNS	

=== Final ===
Rank	Name	Nationality	Result	Notes
1st place, gold medalist(s)	Peter Burge	Australia	8.22	=GR
2nd place, silver medalist(s)	Jai Taurima	Australia	8.22	=GR
3rd place, bronze medalist(s)	Wendell Williams	Trinidad and Tobago	7.95	
4	Shane Hair	Australia	7.82	
5	Mark Anthony Awere	Ghana	7.73	
6	Chris Wright	Bahamas	7.70	
7	Steve Phillips	England	7.64	
8	Chris Davidson	England	7.62	
9	Stephan Louw	Namibia	7.46	
10	Mohd Zaki Sadri	Malaysia	7.23	
11	Richard Duncan	Canada	7.19	
12	Keita Cline	British Virgin Islands	7.10	
