= Peter Burge =

Peter Burge may refer to:

- Peter Burge (rugby) (1884–1956), Australian rugby footballer
- Peter Burge (cricketer) (1932–2001), Australian cricketer
- Peter Burge (athlete) (born 1974), Australian long and triple jumper
