= Robbie Taylor =

Canadian swimmer

Personal information
- Full name: Robbie Taylor
- National team: Canada
- Born: March 31, 1981 (age 45) Toronto, Ontario, Canada
- Height: 1.96 m (6 ft 5 in)
- Weight: 94 kg (207 lb)

Sport
- Sport: Swimming
- Strokes: Freestyle
- Club: City of Brampton (COBRA)
- College team: Texas A&M University
Medal record
Men's swimming
Representing Canada
Commonwealth Games
| Silver medal – second place | 1998 Kuala Lumpur | 4×100 m freestyle |

Robbie Taylor (born March 31, 1981) is a Canadian former swimmer who specialized in sprint freestyle and backstroke events. He earned a silver medal, as a 17-year-old at the 1998 Commonwealth Games, and later represented Canada at the 2000 Summer Olympics. During his sporting career, Taylor trained for the Cobra Swim Club in Brampton, Ontario, under Bill O'Toole, swam for the Texas A&M Aggies swimming and diving team under head coach Mel Nash, and swam at the Canadian National Sport Centre under legendary coach Paul Bergen.

Taylor made his own swimming history at the 1998 Commonwealth Games in Kuala Lumpur, Malaysia. There, he shared silver medals with Craig Hutchison, Stephen Clarke and Garrett Pulle in the 4×100-metre freestyle relay with a time of 3:21.27.

At the 2000 Summer Olympics in Sydney, Taylor competed only in the 4×100-metre freestyle relay. Teaming with Hutchison, Rick Say and Yannick Lupien in heat three, Taylor swam the second leg and recorded a split of 50.89, but the Canadians came up short to fifth place and thirteenth overall in a final time of 3:21.98.

Taylor also sought his bid for the 2008 Summer Olympics in Beijing. At the Canadian Olympic Trials, he posted an identical time of 55.53 to share first place with Jake Tapp in the 100-metre backstroke, but missed a chance to snatch his bid from a head-to-head battle in a swimoff.

They are currently coaching for Club Warriors

== See also ==
- List of Commonwealth Games medallists in swimming (men)
