= Heather Turland =

Australian long-distance runner

Medal record

Women's athletics

Representing Australia

Commonwealth Games
Gold medal – first place	1998 Kuala Lumpur	Marathon

Heather Turland (born 27 April 1960) is an Australian former long-distance runner who competed in road running events. Her greatest achievement was a gold medal in the marathon at the 1998 Commonwealth Games. Her personal best for that distance is 2:34:10 hours.

She was a recreational runner until 1993, by which point she had had four children and was over thirty. She ran at the IAAF World Half Marathon Championships in 1994 and 1996, reaching eighth place at the latter race. She made her marathon debut in 1996 in Frankfurt, coming third in a lifetime best. She went on to represent Australia over that distance at the World Championships in Athletics, coming 20th in 1997 but failing to finish in 1999. Through her 1998 Commonwealth Games victory, she became the oldest Australian to compete in the event's athletics programme.

== Career ==
=== Early life ===
Born and raised in Southern Highlands, New South Wales, she came from a large family of 6 children and lived on a dairy farm. She did not run competitively in her youth and left education to begin a hairdressing apprenticeship. She married Garry Turland and the pair had their first child in June 1982. The two settled into a family life in Bowral on Mount Gibraltar, going on to have four children in the space of six years, with their last being born in Feb 1988.

Turland always love to keep fit running or swimming It remained simply a hobby into her early thirties. The 1993 City2Surf made Turland reassess this situation, as with no training regime she ended fifth in the high level women's race. Her husband encouraged her to take the sport seriously and contacted the Australian Institute of Sport for some basic training advice.

=== First international races ===
Turland established herself among Australia's elite runners in 1994. First she won the Sydney Half Marathon, beating Commonwealth Games medallist Tani Ruckle and gaining sponsorship from Puma as a result. She then went on to take the national title over the half marathon distance. This brought her international selection for the first time and she managed to finish 49th out of 88 runners at the 1994 IAAF World Half Marathon Championships (second among Australians, behind Susan Mahony). She returned to the City to Surf race in August and topped the podium. She competed in races in Asia, Europe and North America the following year and by the time she entered the 1996 IAAF World Half Marathon Championships she was a much improved runner. There, she finished in a time of 72:46 minutes for ninth place (later upgraded to eighth due to Cristina Burca's doping ban). She also won both the Australian half marathon title and City to Surf for a second time in 1996.

The 1996 Frankfurt Marathon was the venue for her debut over the classic marathon distance. The 36-year-old was nervous about her ability to cover the distance, but her husband insisted she had the strength for a good performance. Her time of 2:34:10 hours was enough for third place in the elite level marathon and was an Olympic qualifying time. At the start of the next year she won the Sydney Half Marathon and was selected to run the marathon for Australia at the 1997 World Championships in Athletics. A foot injury hampered her preparations but she returned to fitness in time for the event in Athens. In her second ever outing for the distance she placed 20th at the World Championship marathon. At the end of the year she represented Australia at the Chiba Ekiden and also set a personal best in the 10,000 metres track distance with 33:28.40 minutes for fourth at the Zatopek 10,000.

=== Commonwealth title ===
The start of 1998 did not bode well for Turland. While on her way to compete at the 1998 IAAF World Cross Country Championships she was hit by a motorcycle in Rome and injured. Despite her leg being in plaster for a month, she managed to return to action a few months later. The peak of her career came at the 1998 Commonwealth Games held in September in Kuala Lumpur. She was the oldest ever picked for the Australian athletics team at the event. Turland competed in the marathon and took victory with a run of 2:41:24 hours – winning her first international medal at the age of 38. She led an Australian 1–2 finish, as Lisa Dick was runner-up some 20 seconds behind. This made her the second Australian to win the title, after Lisa Martin who won the first two titles over the distance. Turland was given "The Don" at the Sport Australia Hall of Fame Awards for her performance – the highest honour given by the organisation. The Nagano Marathon was her first marathon of 1999 and she ran the second fastest time of her career (2:36:26 hours) to finish fifth at the race and earned selection for the 1999 World Championships in Athletics. That July she equalled her half marathon personal best at the Townsville Running Festival. At the World Championships she could not match her previous performances and was among the first to drop out of the marathon race, soon after crossing the halfway mark.

The last major win of her career came at the 2002 Sydney Marathon, where she topped the podium at the age of 42 to take the Australian national title over the distance. After retirement, she continued to run recreationally and entered the 2009 City to Surf in the mother/son category with Cade (her youngest).

== Personal bests ==
- 5000 metres – 16:35.49 min (1998)
- 10,000 metres – 33:28.40 min (1997)
- 10K run – 32:46 min (1998)
- Half marathon – 72:56 min (1996)
- Marathon – 2:34:10 hrs (1996)

== International competition record ==
Year	Competition	Venue	Position	Event	Notes
1994	World Half Marathon Championships	Oslo, Norway	49th	Half marathon	1:14:17
1996	World Half Marathon Championships	Palma de Mallorca, Spain	8th	Half marathon	1:12:46
1997	World Championships	Athens, Greece	20th	Marathon	2:42:12
1998	Commonwealth Games	Kuala Lumpur, Malaysia	1st	Marathon	2:41.24
1999	World Championships	Seville, Spain	—	Marathon	DNF
