= Athletics at the 1998 Commonwealth Games – Men's decathlon =

Men's decathlon at the Commonwealth Games

The men's decathlon event at the 1998 Commonwealth Games was held on 17–18 September in Kuala Lumpur.

== Results ==
The highest mark recorded in each event is highlighted in yellow

| Rank | Athlete | Nationality | 100m | LJ | SP | HJ | 400m | 110m H | DT | PV | JT | 1500m | Points | Notes |
|---|---|---|---|---|---|---|---|---|---|---|---|---|---|---|
| 1st place, gold medalist(s) | Jagan Hames | Australia | 10.77 | 7.64 | 14.73 | 2.19 | 49.67 | 14.07 | 46.40 | 5.00 | 64.67 | 5:02.68 | 8490 | AR |
| 2nd place, silver medalist(s) | Scott Ferrier | Australia | 10.84 | 7.59 | 13.34 | 2.13 | 48.25 | 14.20 | 43.99 | 5.10 | 58.95 | 4:55.65 | 8307 | PB |
| 3rd place, bronze medalist(s) | Mike Smith | Canada | 11.23 | 7.17 | 18.03 | 2.01 | 50.38 | 14.77 | 47.89 | 4.60 | 66.87 | 5:00.61 | 8143 | |
| 4 | Doug Pirini | New Zealand | 10.93 | 7.36 | 14.36 | 1.92 | 48.31 | 14.85 | 45.62 | 4.70 | 59.33 | 4:43.14 | 8007 | PB |
| 5 | Peter Banks | Australia | 11.08 | 7.35 | 14.09 | 2.01 | 48.28 | 15.79 | 41.73 | 4.70 | 60.27 | 4:43.70 | 7859 | |
| 6 | Michael Nolan | Canada | 11.31 | 7.24 | 14.63 | 1.92 | 50.21 | 15.55 | 45.77 | 4.80 | 58.28 | 4:51.71 | 7703 | |
| 7 | Du'aine Ladejo | England | 10.47 | 6.97 | 13.31 | 2.04 | 46.12 | 14.91 | 39.24 | 3.90 | 47.15 | 4:41.69 | 7633 | |
| 8 | Dominic Johnson | Saint Lucia | 10.98 | 7.37 | 12.92 | 1.98 | 48.14 | 15.38 | 38.77 | 4.90 | 40.16 | 4:36.65 | 7587 | |
| 9 | Alexis Sharp | Scotland | 11.00 | 7.03 | 13.02 | 1.95 | 50.05 | 15.24 | 46.45 | 4.40 | 58.37 | 4:59.99 | 7542 | |
| 10 | Jamie Quarry | Scotland | 11.04 | 6.77 | 13.61 | 1.92 | 49.40 | 14.51 | 41.12 | 4.60 | 44.35 | 4:36.78 | 7482 | |
| 11 | Simon Poelman | New Zealand | 11.27 | 6.97 | 14.78 | 1.95 | 51.92 | 14.89 | 44.37 | 4.30 | 54.50 | 4:56.34 | 7425 | |
| 12 | Georgios Andreou | Cyprus | 11.11 | 7.00 | 13.29 | 2.01 | 50.96 | 15.69 | 39.88 | 4.70 | 57.08 | 5:22.84 | 7297 | |
| | Levard Missick | Turks and Caicos Islands | 11.36 | 7.10 | 10.75 | 1.92 | 51.43 | 17.49 | | DNS | – | – | DNF | |
| | Barry Thomas | England | 11.49 | 6.74 | 13.42 | DNS | – | – | – | – | – | – | DNF | |
| | Rafer Joseph | England | 11.45 | 6.22 | DNS | – | – | – | – | – | – | – | DNF | |
