= Athletics at the 1998 Commonwealth Games – Men's 10,000 metres =

Men's 10,000 metres at the Commonwealth Games

The men's 10,000 metres event at the 1998 Commonwealth Games was held on 16 September on National Stadium, Bukit Jalil.

== Results ==
Rank	Name	Nationality	Time	Notes
1st place, gold medalist(s)	Simon Maina	Kenya	28:10.00	
2nd place, silver medalist(s)	William Kalya	Kenya	29:01.68	
3rd place, bronze medalist(s)	Steve Moneghetti	Australia	29:02.76	
4	Tsunaki Kalamore	South Africa	29:05.80	
5	Dermot Donnelly	Northern Ireland	29:05.96	
6	Abel Chimukoko	Zimbabwe	29:10.53	
7	Lee Troop	Australia	29:34.23	
8	Makhosonke Fika	South Africa	29:46.41	
9	Glynn Tromans	England	30:04.95	
10	Jumanne Tuluway	Tanzania	30:46.37	
11	Gustav Hendricks	Namibia	30:56.83	
12	Munusamy Ramachandran	Malaysia	31:45.79	
	Jeff Schiebler	Canada	DNF	
	Godfrey Nyombi	Uganda	DNF	
