= Simon Maina =

Kenyan long-distance runner

Medal record

Men's athletics

Representing Kenya

Commonwealth Games
Gold medal – first place	1998 Kuala Lumpur	10,000 m

Simon Maina Munyi (born 18 March 1978) is a Kenyan former long-distance runner who competed in track and road running events. In his first year of international competition, he was the gold medallist in the 10,000 metres at the 1998 Commonwealth Games.

Maina was also runner-up at the 1998 Goodwill Games and represented Kenya at the 1999 All-Africa Games and Chiba Ekiden. He has personal bests of 27:18.74 minutes over 10,000 m and 60:48 minutes for the half marathon. He was the 1998 Kenyan champion over 10,000 m.

Based in Japan, he ran for the Toyota corporate running team. He won twice on the track at the Japan Championships in Athletics over 5000 metres. He switched to road running after 2004 and had podium finishes in the Nagoya and Sapporo half marathons. After suffering an injury in 2007 he was dropped by Toyota and was subsequently arrested and deported from Japan for violating his athlete's visa, raising concern in the sports media over foreign runners' treatment in Japan.

== Career ==
=== Early life and career ===
Born Simon Maina Munyi in Nyeri, Kenya, he was trained by Kenyan running coach David Miano as a teenager. Maina moved to Japan in 1997 to compete for the Toyota corporate running team, based in Aichi Prefecture. That same year he won the 5000 metres at the Japanese Athletics Championships – a feat he repeated the following year with a championship record. He set two track bests at the start of the 1998 outdoor season, running 27:21.14 minutes for the 10,000 metres for second place at the Hyogo Relays, then recording 13:10.71 minutes for third at the Prefontaine Classic 5000 m. The former time meant he was ranked in the top ten runners that year. He rose to the top of the national scene at the Kenyan Athletics Championships, winning the 10,000 m title with a sub-28-minute run.

=== Commonwealth champion ===
Maina made his international debut at the 1998 Goodwill Games and helped complete a Kenyan sweep of the 10,000 m medals, taking the silver medal half a second behind Julius Gitahi, with James Koskei coming in third. He was dominant at the 10,000 metres final at the Commonwealth Games in September, winning the gold medal almost a minute ahead of the runner-up, fellow Kenyan William Kalya.

He opened 1999 with runner-up finishes at the Osaka Grand Prix and Hyogo Relays before improving his 10,000 m best to 27:18.74 minutes at the FBK Games in the Netherlands. The time ranked him eleventh in the world that year. He did not manage to defend his national title in Kenya, finishing seventh, although he did gain selection for the 10,000 m final at the 1999 All-Africa Games. There he placed fourth in a race won by world medallist Assefa Mezgebu in what proved to be his final individual race representing Kenya. Returning to the Japanese circuit, he won at the Shizuoka Meet but was second to Julius Gitahi at the Japanese Championships.

=== Road running ===
Maina made his debut over the half marathon distance in 2000, starting with a run of 62:46 minutes at the Tokyo Half Marathon in January, and then a career best of 60:48 minutes to win the Nagoya Half Marathon. He won the 10,000 m track race at the Hyogo Relays in a then world-leading time of 27:18.95 minutes (fifth best that year). He was out of the running in that event at the Kenyan Championships, thus missing a chance to compete at the 2000 Sydney Olympics. He placed fifth at the high calibre Memorial Van Damme at the end of the track season. He dropped out of the top-30 rankings in 2001, and had a low key season with the exception of a win at the Kumamoto Kosa 10-Miler, which he won in a course record of 45:29 minutes. He returned to form over 10,000 m in 2002, taking runner-up spots at the Hyogo Relays and Nacht Van de Atletik meet to rank 14th globally. He also gained team selection for the Chiba Ekiden, running a 5K leg and placing second with Kenya.

Maina placed first in the 5000 m among the guest athletes at the 2003 Japanese Championships, with the format now changed so that only Japanese runners were ranked. He was runner-up to Julius Maina (an unrelated Kenyan based in Japan) over the 5000 m at the Yokohama Super Meet and was the winner of the Japanese Corporate title over that distance for Toyota. He placed sixth at the Kenyan 10,000 m trials for the 2003 World Championships in Athletics, so did not make the national team. He came twelfth at the Memorial Van Damme race, although such was the speed of the race his time of 27:22.29 minutes ranked him 14th best in the world that year.

After 2003 he had little success in track races. Over the half marathon, he came third at the 2004 and 2005 Sapporo Half Marathon, and was runner-up at the 2005 Nagoya Half Marathon. He won the Nagoya race for the second time in his career in 2006.

=== Injury and deportation ===
He suffered an injury and did not compete in 2007. He was fired that year from the Toyota corporate track team and subsequently a local car parts manufacturing business created its own track and field team to take on Maina and another injured runner, Joseph Kamau, offering them nominal posts in the factory. Maina planned a comeback to the sport at the end of 2008 but he and Kamau were arrested by the immigration police, who treated them as regular labourers working illegally under their athlete visas. The two were taken to trial in November 2008, with some commentators noting that the outcome could affect runners' conditions and set a precedent for Japanese corporate track teams, allowing them to fire injured foreign recruits and leave them open to deportation. At the trial, Maina and Kamau were found guilty and deported back to Kenya.

== Personal bests ==
- 3000 metres – 7:52.3 min (1998)
- 5000 metres – 13:10.71 min (1998)
- 10,000 metres – 27:18.74 min (1999)
- 10-mile run – 45:29 min (2001)
- Half marathon – 60:48 min (2000)

== International competition record ==
Year	Competition	Venue	Position	Event	Notes
1998	Goodwill Games	Uniondale, New York, United States	2nd	10,000 m	
1998	Commonwealth Games	Kuala Lumpur, Malaysia	1st	10,000 m	
1999	All-Africa Games	Johannesburg, South Africa	4th	10,000 m	
2002	Chiba Ekiden	Chiba, Japan	2nd	Ekiden	Team marathon
