= Athletics at the 1998 Commonwealth Games – Men's pole vault =

Men's pole vault at the Commonwealth Games

The men's pole vault event at the 1998 Commonwealth Games was held on 20 September in Kuala Lumpur.

New Zealand's Denis Petushinskiy originally won the silver with 5.55 metres, which would have been the new national record, but he tested positive for a banned substance, stanozolol. He was disqualified and his result annulled.

== Results ==
Rank	Name	Nationality	Result	Notes
1st place, gold medalist(s)	Riaan Botha	South Africa	5.60	GR
2nd place, silver medalist(s)	Paul Burgess	Australia	5.50	
3rd place, bronze medalist(s)	Kersley Gardenne	Mauritius	5.35	
4	Matt Belsham	England	5.25	
5	Kevin Hughes	England	5.15	
6	Marcus Popp	Canada	5.05	
7	Neil Young	Northern Ireland	4.80	
	Ian Tullett	England	NM	
	Denis Petushinsky	New Zealand	DQ	
	Dominic Johnson	Saint Lucia	DNS	
	Rob Pike	Canada	DNS	
