= Athletics at the 1998 Commonwealth Games – Women's 10 kilometres walk =

Women's 10 kilometres walk at the Commonwealth Games

The women's 10 kilometres walk event at the 1998 Commonwealth Games was held on 19 September in Kuala Lumpur.

== Results ==
Rank	Name	Nationality	Time	Notes
1st place, gold medalist(s)	Jane Saville	Australia	43:57	GR
2nd place, silver medalist(s)	Kerry Saxby-Junna	Australia	44:27	
3rd place, bronze medalist(s)	Lisa Kehler	England	45:03	NR
4	Janice McCaffrey	Canada	46:36	
5	Annastasia Raj	Malaysia	46:41	
6	Carolyn Partington	Isle of Man	48:09	
7	Vicky Lupton	England	48:27	
8	Kim Braznell	England	51:15	
9	Monica Akoth Okumu	Kenya	51:56	
10	Karen Kneale	Isle of Man	52:25	
11	Angela Keogh	Norfolk Island	55:00	
	Cheng Tong Lean	Malaysia	DQ	
	Yu Fang Yuan	Malaysia	DQ	
