= Athletics at the 1998 Commonwealth Games – Women's marathon =

Women's marathon at the Commonwealth Games

The women's marathon event at the 1998 Commonwealth Games was held on 20 September in Kuala Lumpur.

== Results ==
Rank	Name	Nationality	Time	Notes
1st place, gold medalist(s)	Heather Turland	Australia	2:41:24	
2nd place, silver medalist(s)	Lisa Dick	Australia	2:41:48	
3rd place, bronze medalist(s)	Elizabeth Mongudhi	Namibia	2:43:28	
4	Gillian Horovitz	England	2:46:58	
5	Lee-Ann McPhillips	New Zealand	2:49:36	
6	Danielle Sanderson	England	2:50.54	
7	Sarah Mahlangu	South Africa	2:59:38	
8	Nthamane Malepa	Lesotho	3:02:14	
9	Julie Cory	Swaziland	3:28.45	
	Matsepo Angelina Sephooa	Lesotho	DNF	
	Carol Galea	Malta	DNF	
	Lucia Subano	Kenya	DNS	
