= Wendell Williams =

Trinidad and Tobago long jumper

Personal information
- Born: October 19, 1968 (age 57) Trinidad, Trinidad and Tobago

Sport
- Sport: Track and field
Medal record
Representing Trinidad and Tobago
Central American and Caribbean Games
Gold medal – first place	1993 Ponce	Long jump
Commonwealth Games
Bronze medal – third place	1998 Kuala Lumpur	Long jump

Wendell Williams (born October 19, 1968, on Trinidad) is a retired male track and field athlete from Trinidad and Tobago who specialized in the long jump. After competing in the 1993 World Championships in Stuttgart, Germany he moved to Berlin, Germany for a half year training stint. Eventually he stayed for more than seven years in Germany.

== Achievements ==
Year	Competition	Venue	Position	Event	Notes
Representing Trinidad and Tobago
1990	Central American and Caribbean Games	Mexico City, Mexico	10th	Long jump	7.28 m
1993	World Championships	Stuttgart, Germany	19th (h)	4x400 m relay	40.24 s
1993	World Championships	Stuttgart, Germany	27th (q)	Long jump	7.63 m
1993	Central American and Caribbean Games	Ponce, Puerto Rico	1st	Long jump	7.95 m
1997	Central American and Caribbean Championships	San Juan, Puerto Rico	4th	Long jump	7.91 m (w)
1998	Central American and Caribbean Games	Maracaibo, Venezuela	4th	Long jump	7.77 m
1998	Commonwealth Games	Kuala Lumpur, Malaysia	3rd	Long jump	7.95 m
2000	Olympic Games	Sydney, Australia	46th (q)	Long jump	7.22 m
