= Athletics at the 1998 Commonwealth Games – Men's 20 kilometres walk =

Men's 20 kilometres walk at the Commonwealth Games

The men's 20 kilometres walk event at the 1998 Commonwealth Games was held on 17 September in Kuala Lumpur.

== Results ==
Rank	Name	Nationality	Time	Notes
1st place, gold medalist(s)	Nicholas A'Hern	Australia	1:24:59	
2nd place, silver medalist(s)	Arturo Huerta	Canada	1:25:49	
3rd place, bronze medalist(s)	Nathan Deakes	Australia	1:26:06	
4	Darrell Stone	England	1:26:37	
5	David Kimutai	Kenya	1:26:57	
6	Teoh Boon Lim	Malaysia	1:27:47	PB
7	Martin Bell	Scotland	1:29:20	
8	Julius Sawe	Kenya	1:29:23	
9	Harbans Narinder Singh	Malaysia	1:30:13	
10	Chris Maddocks	England	1:30:21	
11	Tim Berrett	Canada	1:31:19	
12	Andrew Drake	England	1:32:04	
13	Steve Partington	Isle of Man	1:32:15	
14	Brent Vallance	Australia	1:36:29	
15	Mohd Sharrulhaizy Abdul Rahman	Malaysia	1:36:32	PB
16	Dip Chand	Fiji	1:52:47	
17	Pradeep Chand	Fiji	2:03:38	
