= Swimming at the 1998 Commonwealth Games =

- Venue: National Aquatic Centre, Bukit Jalil
- Location: Kuala Lumpur, Malaysia
- Dates: 12 to 17 September 1998

Swimming at the 1998 Commonwealth Games was the 16th appearance of Swimming at the Commonwealth Games. Competition was held in Kuala Lumpur, Malaysia, from 11 to 21 September 1998.

The events were held at the National Aquatic Centre in Bukit Jalil, which is found in an area called the KL Sports City. The aquatic centre was specifically constructed for the Games and consisted of a 28,000 metre squared footprint and seating for 4,000 spectators.

Australia topped the swimming medal table with 23 gold medals.

National Aquatic Centre in Bukit Jalil

== Medal table ==
* Host nation (Malaysia)

Rank	Nation	Gold	Silver	Bronze	Total
1	Australia	23	15	11	49
2	England	5	8	9	22
3	Canada	4	6	10	20
4	South Africa	0	2	0	2
5	Scotland	0	1	0	1
6	New Zealand	0	0	2	2
Totals (6 entries)		32	32	32	96

== Medalists ==
=== Men ===
Event	Gold		Silver		Bronze	
50 m freestyle	Mark Foster; England	22.58	Brendon Dedekind; South Africa	22.70	Michael Klim; Australia	22.86
100 m freestyle	Michael Klim; Australia	49.43	Chris Fydler; Australia	49.51	Gavin Meadows; England	50.14
200 m freestyle	Ian Thorpe; Australia	1:46.70; CR, OC	Michael Klim; Australia	1:48.05	Daniel Kowalski; Australia	1:48.26
400 m freestyle	Ian Thorpe; Australia	3:44.35; GR	Grant Hackett; Australia	3:44.88	Daniel Kowalski; Australia	3:48.91
1500 m freestyle	Grant Hackett; Australia	14:50.92	Ryk Neethling; South Africa	15:02.88	Kieren Perkins; Australia	15:03.00
100 m backstroke	Mark Versfeld; Canada	55.52	Josh Watson; Australia	55.92	Chris Renaud; Canada	55.99
200 m backstroke	Mark Versfeld; Canada	1:59.67	Adrian Radley; Australia	2:01.41	Greg Hamm; Canada	2:01.47
100 m breaststroke	Simon Cowley; Australia	1:02.00	Phil Rogers; Australia	1:02.46	Darren Mew; England	1:02.52
200 m breaststroke	Simon Cowley; Australia	2:13.13	Ryan Mitchell; Australia	2:13.20	Adam Whitehead; England	2:14.44
100 m butterfly	Geoff Huegill; Australia	52.81	Adam Pine; Australia	53.09	Michael Klim; Australia	53.50
200 m butterfly	James Hickman; England	1:57.11	William Kirby; Australia	1:59.57	Stephen Parry; England	1:59.63
200 m individual medley	Matthew Dunn; Australia	2:00.26	James Hickman; England	2:01.87	Robert van der Zant; Australia	2:02.73
400 m individual medley	Trent Steed; Australia	4:19.89	James Hickman; England	4:20.17	Zane King; Australia	4:23.20
4 × 100 m freestyle relay	Australia; Ashley Callus; Chris Fydler; Ian Thorpe; Michael Klim	3:17.83; GR	Canada; Craig Hutchison; Garret Pulle; Robbie Taylor; Stephen Clarke	3:21.27; NR	England; Anthony Howard; Gavin Meadows; Mark Stevens; Nicholas Shackell	3:22.13
4 × 200 m freestyle relay	Australia; Ian Thorpe (1:47.48); Daniel Kowalski (1:47.81); Matthew Dunn (1:49.15); Michael Klim (1:47.42)	7:11.86; WR	England; Andrew Clayton; Gavin Meadows; James Salter; Mark Stevens	7:23.83	New Zealand; Danyon Loader; John Davis; Scott Cameron; Trent Bray	7:24.52
4 × 100 m medley relay	Australia; Josh Watson; Geoff Huegill; Simon Cowley; Michael Klim; Adrian Radley (heat); Chris Fydler (heat)	3:38.52; GR	England; Darren Mew; Gavin Meadows; James Hickman; Martin Harris; Neil Willey; Nicholas Shackell; Richard Maden	3:40.73; NR	Canada; Andrew Chan; Chris Sawbridge; Craig Hutchinson; Garret Pulle; Jason Flint; Mark Versfeld; Shamek Pietucha; Stephen Clarke	3:42.74

=== Women ===
Event	Gold		Silver		Bronze	
50 m freestyle	Sue Rolph; England	25.82	Alison Sheppard; Scotland	25.92	Toni Jeffs; New Zealand	26.07
100 m freestyle	Sue Rolph; England	55.17	Susie O'Neill; Australia	55.58 OC	Rebecca Creedy; Australia	56.07
200 m freestyle	Susie O'Neill; Australia	2:00.24	Karen Pickering; England	2:01.19	Jessica Deglau; Canada	2:01.59
400 m freestyle	Susie O'Neill; Australia	4:12.39	Vicky Horner; England	4:12.56	Joanne Malar; Canada	4:13.91
800 m freestyle	Rachel Harris; Australia	8:42.23	Joanne Malar; Canada	8:43.96	Sarah Collings; England	8:45.56
100 m backstroke	Giaan Rooney; Australia	1:02.43	Kelly Stefanyshyn; Canada	1:02.81	Meredith Smith; Australia	1:03.19
200 m backstroke	Katy Sexton; England	2:13.18	Meredith Smith; Australia	2:13.19	Helen Don-Duncan; England	2:13.50
100 m breaststroke	Helen Denman; Australia	1:08.71	Samantha Riley; Australia	1:09.08	Lauren van Oosten; Canada	1:09.11
200 m breaststroke	Samantha Riley; Australia	2:27.30	Courtenay Chuy; Canada	2:29.23	Lauren van Oosten; Canada	2:29.58
100 m butterfly	Petria Thomas; Australia	59.42	Susie O'Neill; Australia	59.61	Kathryn Godfrey; Australia	1:00.14
200 m butterfly	Susie O'Neill; Australia	2:06.60; CR, OC	Petria Thomas; Australia	2:10.42	Jessica Deglau; Canada	2:11.67
200 m individual medley	Marianne Limpert; Canada	2:15.05	Joanne Malar; Canada	2:15.28	Sue Rolph; England	2:15.39
400 m individual medley	Joanne Malar; Canada	4:43.74	Elizabeth Warden; Canada	4:47.69	Jennifer Reilly; Australia	4:48.43
4 × 100 m freestyle relay	Australia; Lori Munz; Rebecca Creedy; Sarah Ryan; Susie O'Neill	3:42.61; CR, OC	England; Claire Huddart; Karen Legg; Karen Pickering; Sue Rolph	3:43.20; NR	Canada; Jessica Deglau; Laura Nicholls; Marianne Limpert; Nicole Davey	3:45.48
4 × 200 m freestyle relay	Australia; Anna Windsor; Julia Greville; Lori Munz; Susie O'Neill	8:03.73; CR, OC	England; Claire Huddart; Karen Legg; Karen Pickering; Lyndsey Cooper	8:10.09	Canada; Andrea Schwartz; Jessica Deglau; Joanne Malar; Laura Nicholls	8:11.84
4 × 100 m medley relay	Australia; Giaan Rooney; Helen Denman; Petria Thomas; Susie O'Neill	4:06.36; GR	Canada; Kelly Stefanyshyn; Lauren van Oosten; Marianne Limpert; Sara Alroubaie	4:09.52	England; Caroline Foot; Jaime King; Sarah Price; Sue Rolph	4:13.96

== See also ==
- List of Commonwealth Games records in swimming
