= Cara Honeychurch =

Australian ten-pin bowler

Personal information
- Born: 13 February 1972 (age 54)

Sport
- Country: Australia
- Sport: Bowling

Achievements and titles
- World finals: 1996 AMF Bowling World Cup: Champion
- National finals: Championship Titles 2002 Greater Harrisburg Open; 2001 Greater San Diego Open; 2001 Sport Bowling Challenge; 2001 Clabber Girl Greater Terre Haute Open; 2001 North Myrtle Beach Classic; 2000 Greater Orlando Open; 2000 Brunswick Women's World Open 1999 Brunswick Women's World Open
Medal record
Representing Australia
Women's Bowling
World Tenpin Bowling Championships
Silver medal – second place	1995 Nevada	All Events
World Games
Silver medal – second place	1997 Lahti	Mixed
Atlanta Bowling Challenge Olympic Games
Gold medal – first place	1996 Atlanta	Singles
Commonwealth Games
Gold medal – first place	1998 Kuala Lumpur	Singles
Gold medal – first place	1998 Kuala Lumpur	Doubles
Gold medal – first place	1998 Kuala Lumpur	Mixed
Asian Bowling Championships
Gold medal – first place	1998 Taiwan	All Events
Silver medal – second place	1998 Taiwan	Masters
Gold medal – first place	1994 Guam	Masters
World Youth Bowling Championships
Gold medal – first place	1994 Monterrey	Team
Asian Youth Bowling Championships
Bronze medal – third place	1993 Hong Kong	Masters
Gold medal – first place	1991 Guam	Doubles
Silver medal – second place	1991 Guam	All Events
Silver medal – second place	1991 Guam	Masters

Cara Honeychurch of Melbourne, Victoria, Australia is a female world champion tenpin bowler. She won the AMF Bowling World Cup in 1996 in Belfast, Northern Ireland, and voted Bowler of the Year by the World Bowling Writers the same year. She was inducted to the World Bowling Writers' International Hall of Fame in 1998.

For 35 years, she was a champion in the sport of tenpin bowling in Australia, from representing Australia as an athlete beginning in 1989, and the chief executive officer (CEO) of Tenpin Bowling Australia (TBA) for a decade, until 2020.

Honeychurch competed on the Professional Women's Bowling Association (PWBA) Tour from 1999 to 2003, winning 8 titles. She rolled one of the five televised 300 games in PWBA Tour history, on 7 October 1999. In 2026, she was voted into the PWBA Hall of Fame, Performance category.

== Career ==
=== Amateur ===
Honeychurch is a left-handed bowler who was known for her pinpoint accuracy, finesse and speed control that helped her win numerous titles, particularly in open events. From 1989 until 1998, Honeychurch was a nine-time Australian representative, and she went on to become one of the most successful Australian bowlers in history.

Honeychurch has a long list of domestic successes, including three Australian Masters championships, the NSW Open, three VIC150 victories, and five Adelaide Women's Cup winners. Her accomplishments in open events, when she competed against some of the country's best male competitors, stand out. She won her first of three open titles in 1997, the South Australian Cup.

The South Pacific Classic was qualifier for the Bowling World Cup. Honeychurch won the competition four times, however she only competed in the BWC twice. She made her debut in 1994, finishing third, before returning in 1996 to win the World Cup. She was the second Australian to win the event.

In the Asian Youth, Asian Championships, World Youth, and World Championships, she won 23 medals: eleven gold medals, nine silver medals, and three bronze medals. In the 1997 World Games she won the silver medal in Mixed Doubles with Andrew Frawley. She won three gold medals at the 1998 Commonwealth Games in Kuala Lumpur, in the singles, doubles, and mixed doubles events.

Honeychurch was named Asian Bowler of the Year in 1994 and 1995 and World Bowling Writers Bowler of the Year in 1996 and 1998 for her several victories in international tournaments.

=== Bowling at the Summer Olympics ===
Bowling made appearances at the Olympics in 1988 and 1996, but not as part of the official sports events. It was added as a demonstration sport by the IOC to show off the sport to the rest of the world and to be considered for inclusion in future Games. The Fédération Internationale des Quilleurs (FIQ) Atlanta Bowling Challenge was held on Georgia Institute of Technology's student union lanes during the 1996 Centennial Olympic Games. Cara Honeychurch took the title in this competition.

=== Professional ===
She turned professional before the 1999 World Championships and moved to the United States, where the sport is shown on national television. On the Professional Women's Bowling Association (PWBA) Tour, Honeychurch made an outstanding debut. In her debut year as a professional, she dominated the season averages and finished second on the money earning rankings. She made two appearances on television right away, one for a title, one for a broadcast 300 game, the second in the Tour's history. She rolled another 300-game in qualifying the following week.

In 2000, the Australian won two more titles, led the Tour with a 215.18 average, earned $121,650 (USD), and captured the PWBA Rookie of the Year award. She added four titles in 2001, and the final of her eight wins in 2002. After holding only eight events in 2003, the PWBA Tour went on what would be an 11-year hiatus. Honeychurch chose not to return to the Tour when it restarted in 2015.

She won the United States Bowling Congress Women's Challenge in October 2006, defeating Clara Guerrero, the 2005 World Ranking Masters winner, in the final.

== Recognition ==
In 2022, she was inducted into Sport Australia Hall of Fame.

In January 2026, she was voted into the PWBA Hall of Fame, Performance category, and was officially inducted on May 14.
