= Ricky Nalatu =

Fijian rugby union player

Rick Nalatu
- Born: Rick Nalatu; 1 December 1972 (age 53) Fiji
- Height: 1.81 m (5 ft 11 in)
- Weight: 104 kg (16 st 5 lb)
- School: Sandgate State High School

Rugby union career
Senior career
Years	Team	Apps	(Points)
2006-?	Reds		
National sevens team
Years	Team		Comps
–	Australia 7s		56

Rick Nalatu (born 1 December 1972) is a Fijian-Australian former sprinter and rugby union player who played as a winger.

== Early and personal life ==
Nalatu was born in Fiji and moved to Australia when he was 2 years old.

He was educated at the Sandgate State High School in Brisbane. In 1984, he played in the school's undefeated premiership-winning 1st XV. He later studied education at the Queensland University of Technology.

He began his sporting career as a sprinter, and was a regular on the athletics track at one point at National level, where he was competitive with one of the fastest generations of Australian sprinters including Damien Marsh, Steve Brimacombe and Dean Capobianco. He competed against US sprint legend Michael Johnson in the 1994 Australian 100 m championships won by Marsh. In 1995 he tied with Marsh and Victorian runner Andrew Murphy with a time of 10.50s.

== Rugby career ==
Nalatu switched to rugby in the late 1990's and won a bronze medal as part of the Australian Rugby 7's team at the 1998 Commonwealth Games. He later played wing for the Reds, where he made his debut in 2006 against the Sharks.
