= Dani Le Ray =

Australian rhythmic gymnast

- Full name: Danielle Kate Le Ray
- Nickname: Dani
- Born: 6 November 1982 (age 44) Sutherland, New South Wales

Gymnastics career
- Discipline: Rhythmic gymnastics
- Country represented: Australia
- Club: Le Ray Gymnastics Abbotsleigh in Wahroonga; Le Ray Gymnastics Academy & High Performance in Greenacre; Le Ray Gymnastics Balmain; Le Ray Gymnastics PLC Sydney in Croydon; Le Ray Gymnastics Ravenswood in Gordon
- Retired: 2000
Medal record
Representing Australia
Commonwealth Games
Bronze medal – third place	1998 Kuala Lumpur	Team All-around

Danielle Kate "Dani" Le Ray (born 6 November 1982) is an Australian gymnast. She started gymnastics in 1989 at the age of six. She represented Australia as an Olympic competitor at the Sydney Olympics in rhythmic gymnastics in 2000 and in the Commonwealth Games in Kuala Lumpur in 1998.

On the lead up to the Sydney Olympics, Danielle Le Ray also featured in the Bonds "Our Olympic Heroes" calendar alongside Ian Thorpe, Cathy Freeman; Matt Shirvington; Emma George; Geoff Huegill; James Thompkins & Drew Ginn; Grant Hackett; Tania Van Heer; Patrick Johnson; Andrei Kravtsov; Liz Weeks; and Dean Pullar.

== Roles ==
- Olympian (2000)
- Founder of Le Ray Gymnastics (2000)
- Australian women's Rhythmic Gymnastics Coach at the 2010 Commonwealth Games.
- The Elite Representative on the NSW RG Gymsport Committee
- The NSW Independent Girls Schools Sporting Association Gymnastics Convener

== Le Ray Gymnastics ==
Le Ray Gymnastics is now home of five Gymnastics clubs based in Sydney, Australia:

1. Le Ray Gymnastics Abbotsleigh in Wahroonga
2. Le Ray Gymnastics Academy & High Performance in Greenacre
3. Le Ray Gymnastics Birchgrove
4. Le Ray Gymnastics PLC Sydney in Croydon
5. Le Ray Gymnastics Ravenswood in Gordon

== Achievements ==
- Sydney 2000 Olympian
- Bronze medalist at the Commonwealth Games 1998 in Group All Round
- As the head coach of the Australian women's rhythmic gymnastics team in 2010 the team won the first Australian gold medal in the team event and achieved a further two gold, and two silver in individual events.
- Gymnastics NSW Club of the Year for twelve years running
- Gymnastics NSW Coaching Team of the year for twelve years running
- Founder of "Meriden Rhythmix" (semi-finals of Australia's Got Talent)
