= Zane King =

Australian swimmer

Personal information
- Born: Zane Warren King

Sport
- Country: Australia
- Sport: Swimming
- Event: Medley
Medal record
Men's swimming
Representing Australia
Commonwealth Games
Bronze medal – third place	1998 Kuala Lumpur	400 m medley

Zane Warren King is an Australian former swimmer of the 1990s who competed in medley events.

King, a swimmer from Galston on the outskirts of Sydney, trained at the Australian Institute of Sport in Canberra.

In 1997, King came sixth in the 200m individual medley at the FINA Short Course World Championships and competed at the Pan Pacific Championships in Fukuoka, where he won the B final of the 200m individual medley.

King, a national champion in the 400 m individual medley, was a bronze medalist in that event at the Kuala Lumpur Commonwealth Games in 1998 and also represented Australia at that year's FINA World Championships in Perth.

His wife Rebecca Brown is a former Olympic swimmer.
