= Helen Denman =

Australian swimmer

Personal information
- Full name: Helen Jennifer Denman
- National team: Australia
- Born: 4 September 1976 (age 50) Perth, Western Australia
- Height: 1.82 m (6 ft 0 in)
- Weight: 70 kg (154 lb)

Sport
- Sport: Swimming
- Strokes: Breaststroke
- Club: Southside Dolphins
Medal record
Women's swimming
Representing Australia
Olympic Games
Silver medal – second place	1996 Atlanta	4×100 m medley
World Championships (LC)
Silver medal – second place	1998 Perth	100 m breaststroke
Silver medal – second place	1998 Perth	4×100 m medley
Commonwealth Games
Gold medal – first place	1998 Kuala Lumpur	100 m breaststroke
Gold medal – first place	1998 Kuala Lumpur	4×100 m medley
Universiade
Silver medal – second place	1995 Fukuoka	100 m breaststroke

Helen Jennifer Denman (born 4 September 1976) is an Australian breaststroke swimmer of the 1990s, who won a silver medal in the 4×100-metre medley relay at the 1996 Summer Olympics. She won an individual silver medal in the 100-metre breaststroke at the 1998 World Aquatics Championships, and two gold medals for Australia at the 1998 Commonwealth Games.

Denman qualified for her first international team at the Australian Championships in 1996, after winning the 100-metre breaststroke. At the 1996 Summer Olympics in Atlanta, Denman placed 11th in the 100-metre breaststroke, but fellow Australian Samantha Riley won the bronze medal. This meant that Denman swum the breaststroke leg in the heats of the 4×100-metre medley relay, before being replaced by Riley in the team that trailed the United States team home in the final.

Competing in front of a partisan home crowd at the 1998 World Championships in Perth, Denman set a personal best in winning silver in the 100-metre breaststroke, pushing American Kristy Kowal to within an arm's length. She also combined with Meredith Smith, Petria Thomas and Susie O'Neill in the final of the 4×100-metre medley relay to claim silver behind the Americans.

At the 1998 Commonwealth Games in Kuala Lumpur, Malaysia, Denman claimed gold in the 100 m breaststroke and the 4×100-metre medley relay. In 1999 she was omitted from the Australian national team, and in 2000 she made an unsuccessful attempt to qualify for the 2000 Summer Olympics in Sydney.

Today Helen lives in Melbourne and works in corporate finance for a not-for-profit organisation.

== See also ==
- List of Olympic medalists in swimming (women)
- List of Commonwealth Games medallists in swimming (women)
