= Shane Hair =

Australian long jumper

Shane Hair (born 24 October 1975) is an Australian male former track and field athlete who competed in the long jump. He is a four-time national champion in the long jump, having won three straight titles from 1997 to 1999 and his last in 2004. He ranked fourth at the 1998 Commonwealth Games and was fifth at the 1999 World Championships in Athletics with a jump of 8.24 m (27 ft 1/4 in) – a career best that ranked him ninth in the world for that season. From Western Australia, he also represented his country at the 1994 World Junior Championships in Athletics.

== International competitions ==
Year	Competition	Venue	Position	Event	Notes
1994	World Junior Championships	Lisbon, Portugal	25th (q)	Long jump	7.23 m
1998	Commonwealth Games	Kuala Lumpur, Malaysia	4th	Long jump	7.82 m
1999	World Championships	Seville, Spain	5th	Long jump	8.24 m

== National titles ==
- Australian Athletics Championships
  - Long jump: 1997, 1998, 1999, 2004

== See also ==
- List of Australian athletics champions (men)
