= Lee Naylor (sprinter) =

Australian sprinter (born 1971)

Personal information
- Born: 26 January 1971 (age 55) Shepparton, Victoria, Australia

Sport
- Sport: Track and field
Medal record
Representing Australia
World Championships
Bronze medal – third place	1995 Gothenburg	4x400m relay
Commonwealth Games
Gold medal – first place	1998 Kuala Lumpur	4x400 m relay

Lee Michelle Naylor OAM (born 26 January 1971) is a retired sprinter from Australia. She qualified to the quarter-finals in the 400 metres at the 1996 Summer Olympics before finishing 8th and ran on her national 4 × 400 metres relay team that finished sixth in the qualifying round. At the 2000 Summer Olympics she repeated qualifying to the quarter-finals then finishing 8th in the quarterfinals.

At the 1995 World Championships in Athletics her relay team captured the bronze medal. She ran the third leg on her relay team at the 1998 Commonwealth Games that won gold. She also set her personal record at 51.35 that year. At the 1999 World Championships in Athletics she was disqualified for a lane violation.

Naylor received a doctorate in neurochemistry from the University of Melbourne.

She was awarded the Medal of the Order of Australia in the 2022 Queen's Birthday Honours.

She is the mother of Australian rules football player Max Holmes.
