= Nicholas A'Hern =

Australian racewalker (born 1969)

Medal record

Men's Athletics

Representing Australia

Commonwealth Games
Gold medal – first place	1994 Victoria	30 km Walk
Gold medal – first place	1998 Kuala Lumpur	20 km Walk

Nicholas "Nick" Mark A'Hern (born 6 January 1969 in Swansea, Wales) is a retired Australian race walker, who won gold medals at the Commonwealth Games in both Victoria (1994) and Kuala Lumpur (1998). He represented his country at three Summer Olympics (1992, 1996 and 2000) and also raced at five editions of the World Championships in Athletics (1991–1999). His best placing on the global stage was fourth in the 20 kilometres race walk at the 1996 Atlanta Olympics.

On 14 July 2000, A'Hern was awarded the Australian Sports Medal for his achievements.

== Achievements ==
Year	Competition	Venue	Position	Event	Notes
Representing Australia
1988	World Junior Championships	Sudbury, Canada	7th	10,000 m	42:51.19
1990	Goodwill Games	Seattle, United States	4th	20,000 m	1:23:49.90
1991	World Race Walking Cup	San Jose, United States	15th	20 km	1:22:21
1991	World Championships	Tokyo, Japan	20th	20 km	1:23:44
1992	Olympic Games	Barcelona, Spain	22nd	20 km	1:31:39
1993	World Race Walking Cup	Monterrey, Mexico	13th	20 km	1:27:11
1993	World Championships	Stuttgart, Germany	24th	20 km	1:28:47
1994	Commonwealth Games	Victoria, Canada	1st	30 km	2:07:53
1995	World Championships	Gothenburg, Sweden	11th	20 km	1:23:45
1995	World Race Walking Cup	Beijing, China	15th	20 km	1:23:05
1996	Olympic Games	Atlanta, United States	4th	20 km	1:20:31
1997	World Championships	Athens, Greece	19th	20 km	1:25:46
1997	World Race Walking Cup	Poděbrady, Czech Republic	12th	20 km	1:20:04
1998	Commonwealth Games	Kuala Lumpur, Malaysia	1st	20 km	1:24.59
1999	World Championships	Seville, Spain	26th	20 km	1:38:08
2000	Olympic Games	Sydney, Australia	10th	20 km	1:21:34
