= Peter Burge (long jumper) =

Australian athletics competitor

Personal information
- Nationality: Australian
- Born: 3 July 1974 (age 51) Townsville, Australia
- Height: 1.87 m (6 ft 1 1/2 in)
- Weight: 80 kg (176 lb; 12 st 8 lb)

Sport
- Sport: Athletics
- Event(s): long jump, triple jump
Medal record
Representing Australia
Men's athletics
Commonwealth Games
| Gold medal – first place | 1998 Kuala Lumpur | Long jump |

Peter Burge (born 3 July 1974, in Townsville) is a former Australian long and triple jumper. He is most famous for winning the long jump competition at the 1998 Commonwealth Games. He retired from athletics in 2003.

== Achievements ==
| Year | Competition | Venue | Position | Event | Notes |
Representing Australia
| 1992 | World Junior Championships | Seoul, South Korea | 5th | Triple jump | 16.19 m (wind: +0.2 m/s) |
| 1998 | Commonwealth Games | Kuala Lumpur, Malaysia | 1st | Long jump | 8.22 m |
| 2000 | Olympic Games | Sydney, Australia | 6th | Long jump | 8.15 m |
| 2001 | World Indoor Championships | Lisbon, Portugal | 4th | Long jump | 8.11 m |

== Personal bests ==
Outdoor

- Long jump: 8.30 m (w. +1.1 m/s) (Melbourne 2000)
- Triple jump: 16.19 m (w. +0.2 m/s) (Seoul 1992)

Indoor

- Long jump: 8.11 m (Lisbon 2001, Sindelfingen 2001); then Oceanian record
