= Jagan Hames =

Australian decathlete

Personal information
- Full name: Jagan Graeme Hames
- Born: 31 October 1975 (age 50) McLaren Vale, South Australia
- Height: 190 cm (6 ft 3 in)
- Weight: 80 kg (176 lb)

Sport
- Sport: Athletics
- Event: Decathlon
- Updated on 20 September 2015

Jagan Graeme Hames (born 31 October 1975) is a retired decathlete from Australia, who won the gold medal at the 1998 Commonwealth Games in Kuala Lumpur, Malaysia, setting a personal best (8,490 points). He started his career as a high jumper and has an official PB of 2.30m in this event.

== Achievements ==
Year	Competition	Venue	Position	Event	Notes
Representing Australia
1994	World Junior Championships	Lisbon, Portugal	1st	High jump	2.23 m
1994	Commonwealth Games	Victoria, Canada	13th (q)	High jump	2.15 m
1997	World Championships	Athens, Greece	—	Decathlon	DNF
1998	Commonwealth Games	Kuala Lumpur, Malaysia	1st	Decathlon	8490 pts
1998	IAAF World Combined Events Challenge	several places	10th	Decathlon	24,398 pts
