= Lisa Dick =

Australian long-distance runner

Medal record

Women's athletics

Representing Australia

Commonwealth Games
| Silver medal – second place | 1998 Kuala Lumpur | Marathon |

Lisa Dick (born 26 September 1968) is a former Australian long-distance runner. She won a silver medal in the marathon event at the 1998 Commonwealth Games in Kuala Lumpur.
