= Anne Cross =

Australian long-distance runner

Personal information
- Full name: Anne Therese Cross
- Nationality: Australian
- Born: 16 April 1965 (age 61) Melbourne, Australia

Sport
- Sport: Long-distance running
- Event: 5000 metres

Anne Cross (born 16 April 1965) is an Australian former long-distance runner. She competed in the women's 5000 metres at the 2000 Summer Olympics.
