= Jane Saville =

Australian racewalker

Personal information
- Born: 5 November 1974 (age 52) Sydney, Australia
Medal record
Women's Athletics
Representing Australia
Olympic Games
Bronze medal – third place	2004 Athens	20 km walk
Commonwealth Games
Gold medal – first place	1998 Kuala Lumpur	10 km walk
Gold medal – first place	2002 Manchester	20 km walk
Gold medal – first place	2006 Melbourne	20 km walk

Jane Kara Saville (born 5 November 1974) is an Australian race walker who won a bronze medal at the 2004 Summer Olympics in Athens. She was born in Sydney.

== Career ==
Saville, from an athletically inclined family, competed in swimming, surf lifesaving, and walking as a junior athlete. She has competed at four Olympics, with a midfield result in 1996. In the 20 km racewalking event at the 2000 Summer Olympics in her home city of Sydney, when heading into the stadium's tunnel for the final stretch, Saville was disqualified for an illegal gait (lifting, a very common occurrence in race walking; the previous leader of the event had already been disqualified). Saville collapsed in tears. Afterwards, when asked what she needed, she replied: "A gun to shoot myself". Saville recovered her composure soon after and was publicly philosophical about her loss.

On her bronze medal in Athens, Saville stated: "Nothing will make up for a gold medal in your home town, but you know this is where the Olympics began and any medal here, you know, I'm absolutely ecstatic with it".

Saville has won three gold medals at the Commonwealth Games: in the 10-kilometre walk in 1998 and in the 20-kilometre walk in 2002 and 2006. She has won the Australian women's race walking championship five times. She was the Australian flagbearer at the 2006 Commonwealth Games in Melbourne.

She is coached by her husband, professional cyclist Matt White. She splits her time between Sydney and Oliva, Spain. Her sister, Natalie Saville, is also a race walker and finished second to her at the 2006 Commonwealth Games.

Saville announced her retirement from competitive racewalking in February 2009, with her future plans including continued work in community health and fitness promotion and a role on the IAAF racewalking technical committee.

Saville has completed a Bachelor's degree in social sciences from the University of New South Wales.

Both Jane and her sister Natalie Saville live in the City of Randwick Local Government Area. Together with Natalie, Jane was presented with the Keys to the City of Randwick on 22 October 2002 by Mayor Dominic Sullivan in recognition of outstanding achievement in sport.

== Personal life ==
Saville is married to former professional cyclist Matt White and lives in Spain with their three children. She is a supporter of her hometown rugby league club the South Sydney Rabbitohs.
