= Jai Taurima =

Australian long jumper

Personal information
- Born: 26 June 1972 (age 54) Gold Coast, Queensland, Australia
Medal record
Men's Athletics
Representing Australia
Olympic Games
Silver medal – second place	2000 Sydney	Long Jump
Commonwealth Games
Silver medal – second place	1998 Kuala Lumpur	Long Jump

Jai Desmond Taurima (born 26 June 1972 in Southport, Queensland) is an Australian retired athlete who competed in the long jump.

Despite smoking a packet of cigarettes a day, he won a surprising silver medal at the 2000 Olympics with a personal best jump of 8.49 metres. This was the Oceanic record at the time. He is the son of Elaine (†) and Floyd Taurima, and a sibling of Corrie and Australian track and field coach Stacey Taurima. His partner is Jennifer Smith. He is also known as Jumping Jai or Jumping Jai Taurima.

In addition, Taurima won a silver medal at the 1998 Commonwealth Games.

Since retiring from athletics, Taurima has joined the Australian Federal Police.

Of New Zealand Māori descent, Taurima affiliates to the Ngāti Kahungunu iwi.

In 2014, his daughter, Indie Rose, died from leukemia at the age of two years old.
