= Clair Fearnley =

Australian long-distance runner

Personal information
- Full name: Clair-Louise Fearnley
- Nationality: Australian
- Born: 7 March 1975 (age 51) Halifax, England

Sport
- Sport: Long-distance running
- Event: 10,000 metres
Medal record
Women's athletics
Commonwealth Games
| Bronze medal – third place | 1998 Kuala Lumpur | 10000 m |

Clair-Louise Fearnley (born 7 March 1975) is an Australian former long-distance runner. She competed in the women's 10,000 metres at the 2000 Summer Olympics.
