= Kylie Risk =

Australian long-distance runner

Personal information
- Nationality: Australian
- Born: 28 November 1973 (age 52)

Sport
- Sport: Long-distance running
- Event: 10,000 metres
Medal record
Women's athletics
Commonwealth Games
Silver medal – second place	1998 Kuala Lumpur	10000 m

Kylie Risk (born 28 November 1973) is an Australian former long-distance runner. She competed in the 10,000 metres at the 1996 Summer Olympics and the 2000 Summer Olympics.
