= Athletics at the 1998 Commonwealth Games =

Athletics at the 16th Commonwealth Games
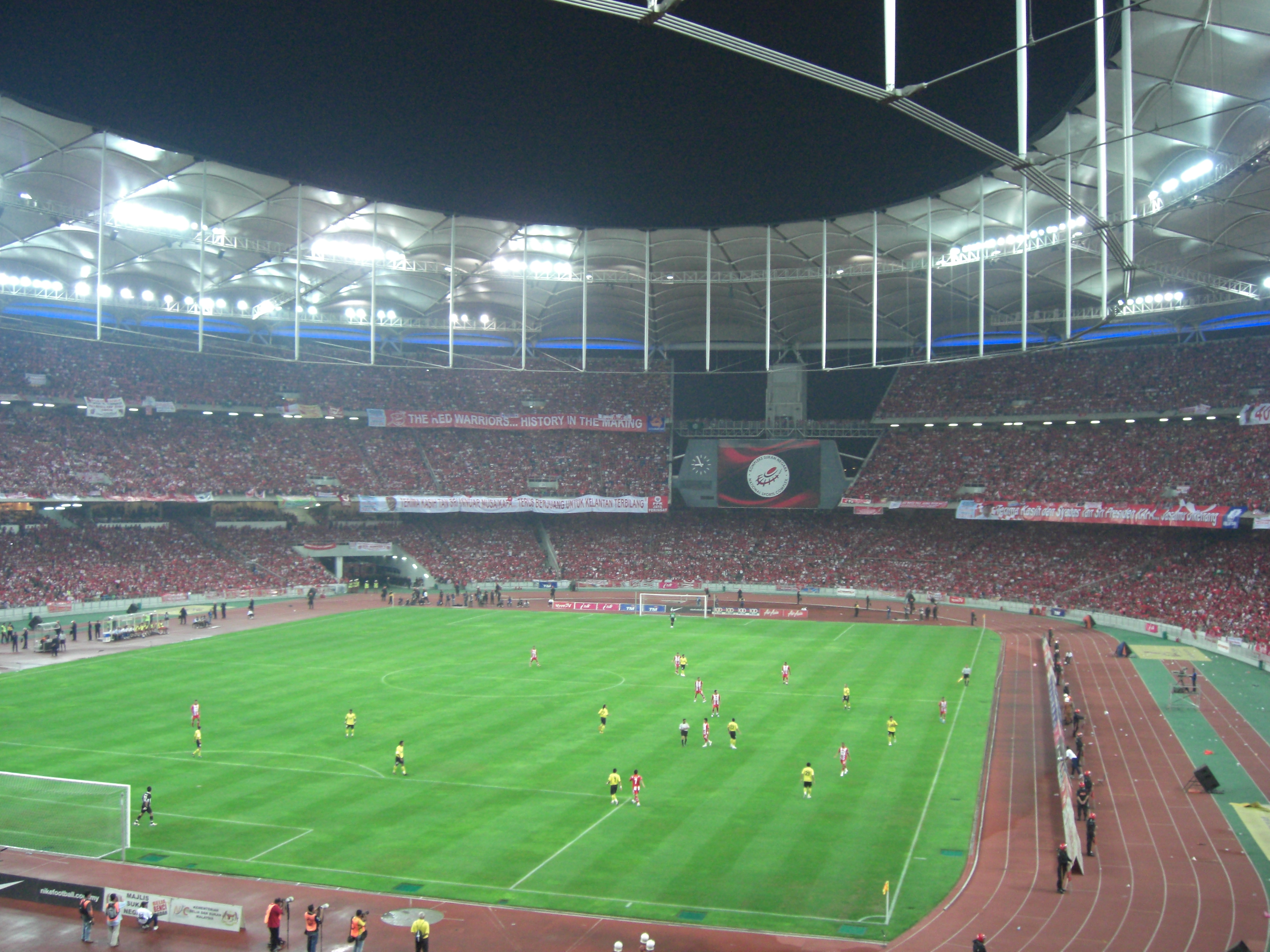
- Dates: 16– 21 September 1998
- Host city: Kuala Lumpur, Malaysia
- Venue: National Stadium, Bukit Jalil
- Level: Senior
- Events: 46
- Participation: 690 athletes from 59 nations
- Records set: 9 Games records

At the 1998 Commonwealth Games, the athletics events were held at the National Stadium, Bukit Jalil, in Kuala Lumpur, Malaysia from the 16–21 September 1998.

== Medal summary ==
=== Men ===
| Event | Gold | | Silver | | Bronze | |
|---|---|---|---|---|---|---|
| 100 metres | Ato Boldon; Trinidad and Tobago | 9.88 s GR | Frankie Fredericks; Namibia | 9.96 s | Obadele Thompson; Barbados | 10.00 s |
| 200 metres | Julian Golding; England | 20.18 s | Christian Malcolm; Wales | 20.29 s | John Regis; England | 20.40 s |
| 400 metres | Iwan Thomas; Wales | 44.52 s GR | Mark Richardson; England | 44.60 s | Sugath Thilakaratne; Sri Lanka | 44.64 s |
| 800 metres | Japheth Kimutai; Kenya | 1:43.82 | Hezekiél Sepeng; South Africa | 1:44.44 | Johan Botha; South Africa | 1:44.57 |
| 1500 metres | Laban Rotich; Kenya | 3:39.49 | John Mayock; England | 3:40.46 | Anthony Whiteman; England | 3:40.70 |
| 5000 metres | Daniel Komen; Kenya | 13:22.57 | Tom Nyariki; Kenya | 13:28.09 | Richard Limo; Kenya | 13:37.42 |
| 10,000 metres | Simon Maina; Kenya | 28:10.00 | William Kalya; Kenya | 29:01.68 | Steve Moneghetti; Australia | 29:02.76 |
| 110 metres hurdles | Tony Jarrett; England | 13.47 s | Steve Brown; Trinidad and Tobago | 13.48 s | Shaun Bownes; South Africa | 13.53 s |
| 400 metres hurdles | Dinsdale Morgan; Jamaica | 48.28 s | Rohan Robinson; Australia | 48.99 s | Kenneth Harnden; Zimbabwe | 49.06 s |
| 3000 metres steeplechase | John Kosgei; Kenya | 8:15.34 | Bernard Barmasai; Kenya | 8:15.37 | Kipkurui Misoi; Kenya | 8:18.24 |
| Marathon | Thabiso Moqhali; Lesotho | 2:19.15 | Simon Mrashani; Tanzania | 2:19.42 | Andea Geway Suja; Tanzania | 2:19.50 |
| 20 kilometres walk | Nick A'Hern; Australia | 1:24.59 | Arturo Huerta; Canada | 1:25.49 | Nathan Deakes; Australia | 1:26.06 |
| 50 kilometres walk | Govindasamy Saravanan; Malaysia | 4:10.05 NR | Duane Cousins; Australia | 4:10.30 | Dominic McGrath; Australia | 4:12.52 |
| 4 × 100 metres relay | England; Dwain Chambers; Marlon Devonish; Julian Golding; Darren Campbell; Jason Gardener (heats) | 38.20 s GR | Canada; Brad McCuaig; Glenroy Gilbert; O'Brian Gibbons; Trevino Betty | 38.46 s | Australia; Gavin Hunter; Darryl Wohlsen; Steve Brimacombe; Matt Shirvington; Rod Zuyderwick (heats) | 38.69 s |
| 4 × 400 metres relay | Jamaica; Davian Clarke; Greg Haughton; Michael McDonald; Roxbert Martin | 2:59.03 GR | England; Mark Richardson; Mark Hylton; Jared Deacon; Paul Slythe; Sean Baldock; Solomon Wariso | 3:00.82 | Wales; Iwan Thomas; Jamie Baulch; Matt Elias; Paul Gray | 3:01.86 |
| High jump | Dalton Grant; England | 2.31 m | Benjamin Challenger; England | 2.28 m | Timothy Forsyth; Australia | 2.28 m |
| Pole vault | Riaan Botha; South Africa | 5.60 m | Paul Burgess; Australia | 5.50 m | Kersley Gardenne; Mauritius | 5.35 m |
| Long jump | Peter Burge; Australia | 8.22 m | Jai Taurima; Australia | 8.22 m | Wendell Williams; Trinidad and Tobago | 7.95 m |
| Triple jump | Onochie Achike; England | 17.10 m | Andrew Owusu; Ghana | 17.03 m | Remmy Kimutai Limo; Kenya | 16.89 m |
| Shot put | Burger Lambrechts; South Africa | 20.01 m | Michalis Louca; Cyprus | 19.52 m | Shaun Pickering; Wales | 19.33 m |
| Discus throw | Robert Weir; England | 64.42 m | Frantz Kruger; South Africa | 63.93 m | Jason Tunks; Canada | 62.22 m |
| Hammer throw | Stuart Rendell; Australia | 74.71 m | Michael Jones; England | 74.02 m | Dewi Hemsley; Wales | 72.83 m |
| Javelin throw | Marius Corbett; South Africa | 88.75 m GR | Steve Backley; England | 87.38 m | Mick Hill; England | 83.80 m |
| Decathlon | Jagan Hames; Australia | 8490 points | Scott Ferrier; Australia | 8307 points | Mike Smith; Canada | 8143 points |

=== Women ===
| Event | Gold | | Silver | | Bronze | |
|---|---|---|---|---|---|---|
| 100 metres | Chandra Sturrup; Bahamas | 11.06 s | Philomena Mensah; Canada | 11.19 s | Tania Van-Heer; Australia | 11.29 s |
| 200 metres | Nova Peris-Kneebone; Australia | 22.77 s | Juliet Campbell; Jamaica | 22.79 s | Lauren Hewitt; Australia | 22.83 s |
| 400 metres | Sandie Richards; Jamaica | 50.17 s GR | Allison Curbishley; Scotland | 50.71 s | Donna Fraser; England | 51.01 s |
| 800 metres | Maria de Lurdes Mutola; Mozambique | 1:57.60 | Tina Paulino; Mozambique | 1:58.39 | Diane Modahl; England | 1:58.81 |
| 1500 metres | Jackline Maranga; Kenya | 4:05.27 GR | Kelly Holmes; England | 4:06.10 | Julia Sakara; Zimbabwe | 4:07.82 NR |
| 5000 metres | Kate Anderson; Australia | 15:52.74 | Andrea Whitcombe; England | 15:56.85 | Samukeliso Moyo; Zimbabwe | 15:57.57 |
| 10,000 metres | Esther Wanjiru; Kenya | 33:40.13 | Kylie Risk; Australia | 33:42.11 | Clair Fearnley; Australia | 33:52.13 |
| 100 metres hurdles | Gillian Russell; Jamaica | 12.70 s GR | Sriyani Kulawansha; Sri Lanka | 12.95 s | Katie Anderson; Canada | 13.04 s |
| 400 metres hurdles | Andrea Blackett; Barbados | 53.91 s | Gowry Retchakan-Hodge; England | 55.25 s | Karlene Haughton; Canada | 55.53 s |
| Marathon | Heather Turland; Australia | 2:41.24 | Lisa Dick; Australia | 2:41.48 | Elizabeth Mongudhi; Namibia | 2:43.28 |
| 10 kilometres walk | Jane Saville; Australia | 43:57 GR | Kerry Saxby-Junna; Australia | 44:27 | Lisa Kehler; England | 45:03 |
| 4 × 100 metres relay | Australia; Tania van Heer; Lauren Hewitt; Nova Peris-Kneebone; Sharon Cripps | 43.39 s | Jamaica; Donnette Brown; Juliet Campbell; Gillian Russell; Brigitte Foster | 43.49 s | England; Marcia Richardson; Donna Fraser; Simmone Jacobs; Joice Maduaka | 43.69 s |
| 4 × 400 metres relay | Australia; Susan Andrews; Tamsyn Lewis; Lee Naylor; Tania van Heer | 3:27.28 | England; Michelle Thomas; Michelle Pierre; Victoria Day; Donna Fraser | 3:29.28 | Canada; Karlene Haughton; Diane Cummins; LaDonna Antoine; Foy Williams | 3:29.97 |
| High jump | Hestrie Storbeck; South Africa | 1.91 m | Joanne Jennings; England | 1.91 m | Alison Inverarity; Australia | 1.88 m |
| Pole vault | Emma George; Australia | 4.20 m | Elmarie Gerryts; South Africa | 4.15 m | Trista Bernier; Canada | 4.15 m |
| Long jump | Joanne Wise; England | 6.63 m | Jacqueline Edwards; Bahamas | 6.59 m | Nicole Boegman; Australia | 6.58 m |
| Triple jump | Ashia Hansen; England | 14.32 m | Françoise Mbango; Cameroon | 13.95 m | Connie Henry; England | 13.94 m |
| Shot put | Judy Oakes; England | 18.83 m | Myrtle Augee; England | 17.16 m | Johanna Abrahamse; South Africa | 16.52 m |
| Discus throw | Beatrice Faumuina; New Zealand | 65.92 m GR | Lisa Marie Vizaniari; Australia | 62.14 m | Alison Lever; Australia | 59.80 m |
| Hammer throw | Deborah Sosimenko; Australia | 66.56 m | Lorraine Shaw; England | 62.66 m | Caroline Wittrin; Canada | 61.67 |
| Javelin throw | Louise McPaul; Australia | 66.96 m | Karen Martin; England | 57.82 m | Kirsty Morrison; England | 56.34 m |
| Heptathlon | Denise Lewis; England | 6513 pts | Jane Jamieson; Australia | 6354 pts | Joanne Henry; New Zealand | 6096 pts |

== Medal table ==
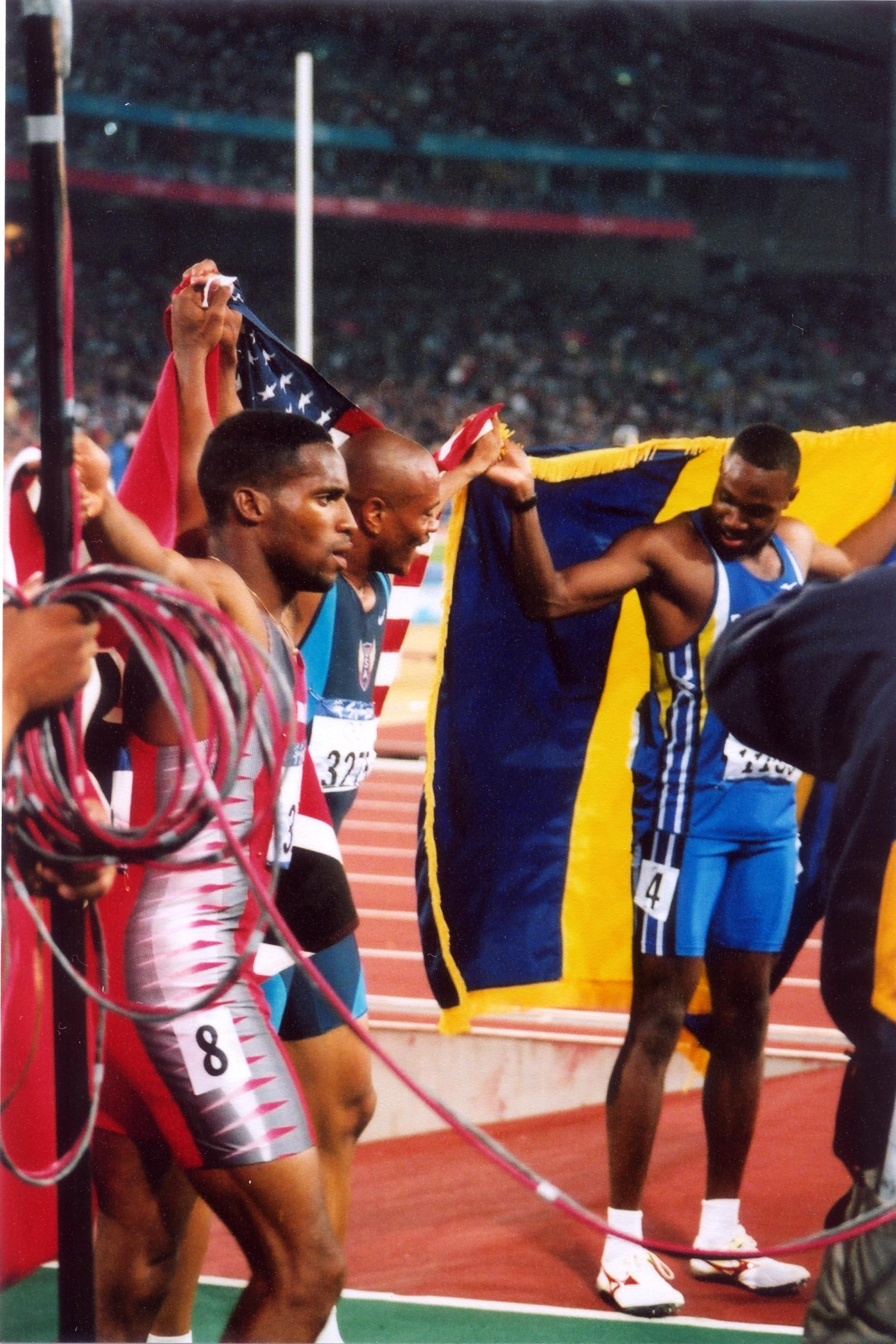
Ato Boldon (left) and Obadele Thompson (right) also won 100 m medals at the 2000 Sydney Olympics.

* Host nation (Malaysia)

| Rank | Nation | Gold | Silver | Bronze | Total |
|---|---|---|---|---|---|
| 1 | Australia | 13 | 10 | 11 | 34 |
| 2 | England | 10 | 14 | 9 | 33 |
| 3 | Kenya | 7 | 3 | 3 | 13 |
| 4 | South Africa | 4 | 3 | 4 | 11 |
| 5 | Jamaica | 4 | 2 | 0 | 6 |
| 6 | Wales | 1 | 1 | 3 | 5 |
| 7 | Trinidad and Tobago | 1 | 1 | 1 | 3 |
| 8 | Bahamas | 1 | 1 | 0 | 2 |
| 8 | Mozambique | 1 | 1 | 0 | 2 |
| 10 | Barbados | 1 | 0 | 1 | 2 |
| 10 | New Zealand | 1 | 0 | 1 | 2 |
| 12 | Lesotho | 1 | 0 | 0 | 1 |
| 12 | Malaysia* | 1 | 0 | 0 | 1 |
| 14 | Canada | 0 | 3 | 7 | 10 |
| 15 | Namibia | 0 | 1 | 1 | 2 |
| 15 | Sri Lanka | 0 | 1 | 1 | 2 |
| 15 | Tanzania | 0 | 1 | 1 | 2 |
| 18 | Cameroon | 0 | 1 | 0 | 1 |
| 18 | Cyprus | 0 | 1 | 0 | 1 |
| 18 | Ghana | 0 | 1 | 0 | 1 |
| 18 | Scotland | 0 | 1 | 0 | 1 |
| 22 | Zimbabwe | 0 | 0 | 3 | 3 |
| 23 | Mauritius | 0 | 0 | 1 | 1 |
| Totals (23 entries) | | 46 | 46 | 47 | 139 |

== Participation ==
- Anguilla (3)
- Antigua and Barbuda (4)
- Australia (74)
- Bahamas (9)
- Barbados (8)
- Belize (2)
- Bermuda (2)
- Botswana (8)
- British Virgin Islands (3)
- Cameroon (11)
- Canada (55)
- Cook Islands (1)
- Cyprus (6)
- Dominica (1)
- England (120)
- Falkland Islands (1)
- Fiji (16)
- Gambia (7)
- Ghana (11)
- Grenada (1)
- Isle of Man (4)
- Jamaica (27)
- Kenya (30)
- Lesotho (8)
- Malawi (2)
- Malaysia (36)
- Maldives (6)
- Malta (1)
- Mauritius (13)
- Montserrat (4)
- Mozambique (3)
- Namibia (13)
- Nauru (1)
- New Zealand (28)
- Norfolk Island (2)
- Northern Ireland (12)
- Pakistan (4)
- Papua New Guinea (1)
- Saint Kitts and Nevis (1)
- Saint Lucia (2)
- Saint Vincent and the Grenadines (5)
- Samoa (3)
- Scotland (18)
- Seychelles (5)
- Sierra Leone (9)
- Singapore (2)
- Solomon Islands (2)
- South Africa (30)
- Sri Lanka (6)
- Swaziland (2)
- Tanzania (7)
- Tonga (3)
- Trinidad and Tobago (5)
- Turks and Caicos Islands (3)
- Uganda (8)
- Vanuatu (3)
- Wales (22)
- Zambia (5)
- Zimbabwe (11)
