= Shooting at the 1990 Commonwealth Games =

- Venue: Waitemata Gun Club, Mangatāwhiri Range, Ardmore Range
- Location: Auckland, New Zealand
- Dates: 24 January – 3 February 1990

Shooting at the 1990 Commonwealth Games was the sixth appearance of Shooting at the Commonwealth Games. The events were held at three venues outside of the host city Auckland, New Zealand, from 24 January to 3 February 1990 and featured contests in 22 disciplines (an increase of 2 from 1986).

The shooting events were held at the Waitemata Gun Club in Kumeū to the north of the city, the Mangatāwhiri Range in Mangatāwhiri and the Ardmore Range in Ardmore (both to the south).

Australia topped the shooting medal table by virtue of winning seven gold medals. Colin Mallett won the first Commonwealth Games gold medal for Jersey.

== Medal table ==
* Host nation (New Zealand)

Medals won by nation with totals, ranked by number of golds—sortable
Rank	Nation	Gold	Silver	Bronze	Total
1	Australia	7	5	3	15
2	Canada	4	3	1	8
3	England	3	8	6	17
4	New Zealand*	3	3	3	9
5	India	1	1	3	5
6	Bangladesh	1	0	1	2
6	Jersey	1	0	1	2
6	Scotland	1	0	1	2
9	Guernsey	1	0	0	1
10	Wales	0	1	1	2
11	Cyprus	0	1	0	1
12	Hong Kong	0	0	1	1
Totals (12 entries)		22	22	21	65

== Medallists ==
Event	Gold	Silver	Bronze
50m Free Pistol	Phil Adams (AUS)	Bengt Sandstrom (AUS)	Gilbert U (HKG)
50m Free Pistol - Pairs	Australia; Phil Adams; Bengt Sandström	New Zealand; Brian Read; Greg Yelavich	Bangladesh; Ateequr Rahman; Abdus Sattar
25m Centre-Fire Pistol	Ashok Pandit (IND)	Surinder Marwah (IND)	Bruce Quick (AUS)
25m Centre-Fire Pistol - Pairs	Australia; Phil Adams; Bruce Quick	New Zealand; Barry O'Neale; Greg Yelavich	India; Ashok Pandit; Surinder Marwah
25m Rapid-Fire Pistol	Adrian Breton (GGY)	Pat Murray (AUS)	Michael Jay (WAL)
25m Rapid-Fire Pistol - Pairs	Australia; Bruce Favell; Pat Murray	Canada; Stanley Wills; Mark Howkins	England; Brian Girling; John Rolfe
10m Air Pistol	Bengt Sandström (AUS)	Phil Adams (AUS)	David Lowe (ENG)
10m Air Pistol - Pairs	Bangladesh; Ateequr Rahman; Abdus Sattar	Australia; Phil Adams; Bengt Sandström	New Zealand; Julian Lawton; Greg Yelavich
50m Rifle Prone	Roger Harvey (NZL)	Stephen Petterson (NZL)	Philip Scanlan (ENG)
50m Rifle Prone - Pairs	New Zealand; Stephen Petterson; Roger Harvey	Canada; Barry Sutherland; Michael Ashcroft	England; Bob Jarvis; Philip Scanlan
50m Rifle Three Positions	Mart Klepp (CAN)	Malcolm Cooper (ENG)	Soma Dutta (IND)
50m Small Bore Rifle Three Positions - Pairs	Canada; Jean-François Sénécal; Mart Klepp	England; Malcolm Cooper; Robert Smith	Scotland; Bill Murray; Robin Law
Full Bore Rifle	Colin Mallett (JER)	Andrew Tucker (ENG)	James Corbett (AUS)
Full Bore Rifle - Pairs	England; Simon Belither; Andrew Tucker	Australia; James Corbett; Barry Wood	Jersey; Clifford Mallett; Colin Mallett
10m Air Rifle	Guy Lorion (CAN)	Chris Hector (ENG)	Mart Klepp (CAN)
10m Air Rifle - Pairs	Canada; Guy Lorion; Mart Klepp	England; Chris Hector; Robert Smith	India; Soma Dutta; Bhagirath Samai
10m Running Target	Colin Robertson (AUS)	John Maddison (ENG)	Tony Clarke (NZL)
10m Running Target - Pairs	New Zealand; Paul Carmine; Tony Clarke	Canada; David Lee; Mark Bedlington	Not awarded (only 4 entries)
Trap	John Maxwell (AUS)	Kevin Gill (ENG)	Ian Peel (ENG)
Trap - Pairs	England; Kevin Gill; Ian Peel	Wales; Colin Evans; James Birkett-Evans	Australia; Russell Mark; John Maxwell
Skeet	Ken Harman (ENG)	Georgios Sakellis (CYP)	Andy Austin (ENG)
Skeet - Pairs	Scotland; Ian Marsden; Jim Dunlop	England; Andy Austin; Ken Harman	New Zealand; Tim Dodds; John Woolley

== Results ==
=== 50m Free pistol ===
Pos	Athlete	Score
1	(Australia) Phil Adams	554
2	(Australia) Ben Sandstrom	549
2	(Hong Kong) Gilbert U	549
4	(England) Paul Leatherdale	546
5	(England) David Lowe	544
6	(New Zealand) Greg Yelavich	543
7	(New Zealand) Brian Read	543
8	(Canada) Stanley Wills	543
9	(Canada) John Rochon	537
10	(Bangladesh) Ateequr Rahman	534

=== 50m Free pistol – pairs ===
Pos	Athlete	Score
1	(Australia) Phil Adams & Ben Sandstrom	1106
2	(New Zealand) Brian Read & Greg Yelavich	1084
3	(Bangladesh) Ateequr Rahman & Abdus Sattar	1078
4	(England) David Lowe & Paul Leatherdale	1075
5	(Hong Kong) Gilbert U & Kar-Fai Ho	1069

=== 25m Centre-Fire pistol ===
Pos	Athlete	Score
1	(India) Ashok Pandit	583
2	(India) Surinder Marwah	577
2	(Australia) Bruce Quick	576
4	(Wales) Michael Jay	576
5	(Australia) Phil Adams	574
6	(England) Collin Greenhough	567
6	(New Zealand) Greg Yelavich	567
6	(New Zealand) Barry O'Neale	567
9	(Jersey) Derek Bernard	566
10	(Hong Kong) Yiu-Kai Leung	565

=== 25m Centre-Fire pistol – pairs ===
Pos	Athlete	Score
1	(Australia) Phil Adams & Bruce Quick	1155
2	(New Zealand) Barry O'Neale & Greg Yelavich	1144
3	(India) Ashok Pandit & Surinder Marwah	1142
4	(England) Collin Greenhough & David Levene	1140
5	(Wales) Michael Jay & Stephen Pengelly	1136

=== 25m Rapid-Fire pistol ===
Pos	Athlete	Score
1	(Guernsey) Adrian Breton	583
2	(Australia) Pat Murray	582
2	(Wales) Michael Jay	579
4	(England) John Rolfe	578
5	(Australia) Bruce Ian Favell	574
6	(Canada) Mark Howkins	571
7	(England) Brian Girling	566
8	(New Zealand) Barry O'Neale	565
9	(New Zealand) Michael Smith	555
10	(Canada) Stanley Wills	550

=== 25m Rapid-Fire pistol – pairs ===
Pos	Athlete	Score
1	(Australia) Bruce Favell & Pat Murray	1153
2	(Canada) Stanley Wills & Mark Howkins	1138
3	(England) Brian Girling & John Rolfe	1133
4	(Wales) Michael Jay & Stephen Pengelly	1112
5	(Hong Kong) Yiu-Kai Leung & Chung-Kin Ho	1100

=== 10m Air pistol ===
Pos	Athlete	Score
1	(Australia) Ben Sandstrom	580
2	(Australia) Phil Adams	574
2	(England) David Lowe	574
4	(England) Paul Leatherdale	573
5	(Scotland) Jim Tollan	572
6	(India) Ashok Pandit	568
7	(New Zealand) Greg Yelavich	568
8	(New Zealand) Julian Lawton	566
9	(Scotland) Derek McIntosh	565
10	(Hong Kong) Gilbert U	565

=== 10m Air Pistol – pairs ===
Pos	Athlete	Score
1	(Bangladesh) Ateequr Rahman & Abdus Sattar	1138
2	(Australia) Phil Adams & Ben Sandstrom	1138
3	(New Zealand) Julian Lawton & Greg Yelavich	1137
4	(Hong Kong) Gilbert U & Kar-Fai Ho	1130
5	(England) Paul Leatherdale & David Lowe	1129

=== 50m Rifle prone ===
Pos	Athlete	Score
1	(New Zealand) Roger Harvey	591
2	(New Zealand) Stephen Petterson	590
2	(England) Philip Scanlan	590
4	(Canada) Barry Sutherland	590
5	(Australia) Barry Elwin Sturgess	590
6	(Canada) Michael Ashcroft	587
7	(Wales) John Dallimore	586
8	(Guernsey) Robert Courtney	586
9	(Scotland) John Knowles	585
10	(Isle of Man) Stewart W. Watterson	585

=== 50m Rifle prone – pairs ===
Pos	Athlete	Score
1	(New Zealand) Stephen Petterson & Roger Harvey	1185
2	(Canada) Barry Sutherland & Michael Ashcroft	1184
3	(England) Bob Jarvis & Philip Scanlan	1180
4	(Australia) Alan Keith Smith & Barry Elwin Sturgess	1179
5	(Scotland) Gordon Winch & John Knowles	1173

=== 50m Rifle three-positions ===
Pos	Athlete	Score
1	(Canada) Mart Klepp	1157
2	(England) Malcolm Cooper	1154
2	(India) Soma Dutta	1143
4	(Canada) Jean-François Sénécal	1142
5	(New Zealand) Eddie Adlam	1138
6	(Australia) Alison Hittmann	1135
7	(England) Robert Smith	1134
8	(Australia) Anton Wurfel	1134
9	(Scotland) Robin Law	1133
10	(Scotland) Alister Allan	1129

=== 50m Rifle three-positions – pairs ===
Pos	Athlete	Score
1	(Canada) Jean-François Sénécal & Mart Klepp	2272
2	(England) Malcolm Cooper & Robert Smith	2268
3	(Scotland) Robin Law & Bill Murray	2258
4	(India) Soma Dutta & T. C. Palangappa	2245
5	(Australia) Alison Hittmann & Anton Wurfel	2234

=== Full Bore rifle Queens prize pair ===
Pos	Athlete	Score
1	(Jersey) Colin Mallett	394
2	(England) Andrew Tucker	390
2	(Australia) James Corbett	390
4	(England) Simon Belither	390
5	(Scotland) Arthur Clarke	389
6	(Jersey) Clifford Mallett	388
7	(Jamaica) Hugh Tomlinson	386
8	(Australia) Barry James Wood	384
9	(Wales) Chris Hockley	383
10	(Guernsey) Robert Courtney	383

=== Full Bore Rifle Queens prize pair - pairs ===
Pos	Athlete	Score
1	(England) Simon Belither & Andrew Tucker	580
2	(Australia) James Corbett & Barry James Wood	565
3	(Jersey) Clifford Mallett & Colin Mallett	564
4	(Northern Ireland) David Calvert & Martin Millar	563
5	(Scotland) Arthur Clarke & James Scobie	562

=== 10m Air rifle ===
Pos	Athlete	Score
1	(Canada) Guy Lorion	583
2	(England) Chris Hector	578
2	(Canada) Mart Klepp	577
4	(India) Soma Dutta	576
5	(Australia) Alison Hittmann	575
6	(England) Robert Smith	573
7	(New Zealand) Diana Preston	572
8	(Scotland) Robin Law	571
9	(Jersey) Melanie Clayden	571
10	(Scotland) Alister Allan	570

=== 10m Air rifle – pairs ===
Pos	Athlete	Score
1	(Canada) Guy Lorion & Mart Klepp	1163
2	(England) Chris Hector & Robert Smith	1155
3	(India) Soma Dutta & Bhagirath Samai	1148
4	(Australia) Alison Hittmann & Wolfgang Jobst	1145
5	(Scotland) Robin Law & Alister Allan	1143

=== 10 metres running target ===
Pos	Athlete	Score
1	(Australia) Colin Robertson	539
2	(England) John Maddison	539
2	(New Zealand) Tony Clarke	535
4	(Canada) Mark Bedlington	534
5	(Canada) David Lee	532
6	(New Zealand) Paul Carmine	528
7	(England) David Chapman	527
8	(Australia) Bryan Wilson	524
9	(Papua New Guinea) John Schofield	395

=== 10 metres running target - pairs ===
Pos	Athlete	Score
1	(Australia) Paul Carmine & Tony Clarke	1091
2	(Canada) David Lee & Mark Bedlington	1070
3	(England) David Chapman & John Maddison	1064
4	(Australia) Colin Robertson & Bryan Wilson	1051

=== Clay pigeon trap ===
Pos	Athlete	Score
1	(Australia) John Maxwell	184
2	(England) Kevin Gill	183
2	(England) Ian Peel	179
4	(Australia) Russell Mark	178
5	(Scotland) Peter Croft	177
6	(Wales) James Birkett-Evans	177
7	(Scotland) Gary Peacock	176
8	(India) Mansher Singh	175
8	(Malta) Joseph Attard	175
8	(Wales) Colin D. Evans	175

=== Trap – pairs ===
Pos	Athlete	Score
1	(England) Kevin Gill & Ian Peel	181
2	(Wales) Colin Evans & James Birkett-Evans	178
3	(Australia) Russell Mark & John Maxwell	178
4	(Scotland) Peter Croft & Gary Peacock	174
5	(New Zealand) Brian Wistrand & Russell McGowan	174

=== Skeet ===
Pos	Athlete	Score
1	(England) Ken Harman	187
2	(Cyprus) Georgios Sakellis	187
2	(England) Andy Austin	184
4	(Wales) Desmond Davies	184
5	(New Zealand) John Woolley	183
6	(Isle of Man) Nigel Kelly	182
7	(Scotland) Ian Marsden	180
8	(Australia) Ian Hale	179
9	(Scotland) Jim Dunlop	178
10	(Australia) Craig Andrew Meuleman	177

=== Skeet – pairs ===
Pos	Athlete	Score
1	(Scotland) Ian Marsden & Jim Dunlop	189
2	(England) Andy Austin & Ken Harman	185
3	(New Zealand) Tim Dodds & John Woolley	183
4	(Cyprus) Georgios Sakellis & Petros Kyrisis	181
5	(Wales) Desmond Davies & Antony Lewis	181

== See also ==
- List of Commonwealth Games medallists in shooting
