= Bangladesh at the Commonwealth Games =

- CG code: BAN
- CGA: Bangladesh Olympic Association
- Website: nocban.org
- Medals Ranked 39th: Gold 2 Silver 4 Bronze 2 Total 8

Commonwealth Games appearances (overview)
- 1978; 1982–1986; 1990; 1994; 1998; 2002; 2006; 2010; 2014; 2018; 2022; 2026; 2030

Formerly known as East Pakistan, Bangladesh has competed at eight Commonwealth Games, with the first coming in 1978. They did not compete again until 1990, but have competed in every Games since. Bangladesh has won eight Commonwealth Games medals, all coming in shooting events.

== Medals ==
Games	Gold	Silver	Bronze	Total
1978 Edmonton	0	0	0	0
1982 Brisbane	did not attend			
1986 Edinburgh	did not attend			
1990 Auckland	1	0	1	2
1994 Victoria	0	0	0	0
1998 Kuala Lumpur	0	0	0	0
2002 Manchester	1	0	0	1
2006 Melbourne	0	1	0	1
2010 Delhi	0	0	1	1
2014 Glasgow	0	1	0	1
2018 Gold Coast	0	2	0	2
2022 Birmingham	0	0	0	0
Total	2	4	2	8

== List of medalists ==
Bangladesh's most successful medallist at the Commonwealth Games was Asif Hossain Khan who earned himself one gold, one silver and one bronze. He also shares the most Commonwealth Games medals for Bangladesh with Abdullah Hel Baki with three medals each.

Medal	Name	Games	Sport	Event
Gold	Ateequr Rahman; Abdus Sattar	1990 Auckland	Shooting	Men's Air Pistol - Pairs
Bronze	Ateequr Rahman; Abdus Sattar	1990 Auckland	Shooting	Men's Free Pistol - Pairs
Gold	Asif Hossain Khan	2002 Manchester	Shooting	Men's Air Rifle
Silver	Asif Hossain Khan; Anjan Kumer Singha	2006 Melbourne	Shooting	Men's 10 m Air Rifle Pairs
Bronze	Abdullah Hel Baki; Asif Hossain Khan	2010 Delhi	Shooting	Men's 10 m Air Rifle Pairs
Silver	Abdullah Hel Baki	2014 Glasgow	Shooting	Men's 10 m Air Rifle
Silver	Abdullah Hel Baki	2018 Gold Coast	Shooting	Men's 10 m Air Rifle
Silver	Shakil Ahmed	2018 Gold Coast	Shooting	Men's 50 m Pistol

== Medals by sport ==
Bangladesh has so far only achieved medals from the Shooting event.

Sport	Gold	Silver	Bronze	Total
Shooting	2	4	2	8
Totals (1 entries)	2	4	2	8
