= England at the 1990 Commonwealth Games =

- CG code: ENG
- CGA: Commonwealth Games England

in Auckland, New Zealand
- Medals Ranked 2nd: Gold 47 Silver 40 Bronze 42 Total 129

Commonwealth Games appearances (overview)
- 1930; 1934; 1938; 1950; 1954; 1958; 1962; 1966; 1970; 1974; 1978; 1982; 1986; 1990; 1994; 1998; 2002; 2006; 2010; 2014; 2018; 2022; 2026; 2030

England competed at the 1990 Commonwealth Games in Auckland, New Zealand, between 24 January and 3 February 1990.

England finished second in the medal table behind Australia with 46 gold medals, 40 silver medals and 42 bronze medals.

== Medal table (top three) ==
Rank	Nation	Gold	Silver	Bronze	Total
1	Australia	52	54	58	164
2	England	47	40	42	129
3	Canada	36	42	38	116
Totals (3 entries)		135	136	138	409

The athletes that competed are listed below.

== Athletics ==
Name	Event/s	Medal/s
Marcus Adam	100m, 200m, 4 × 100 m relay	2 x gold
Kriss Akabusi	400m hurdles, 4 × 400 m relay	1 x gold
Sharon Nivan Andrews	discus	
Andy Ashurst	pole vault	
Jane Christine Aucott	discus	
Myrtle Augee	shot put	1 x gold
Steve Backley	javelin	1 x gold
Shireen Bailey	1,500m	
Lorraine Baker	800m	
Matthew Belsham	pole vault	
Todd Bennett	400m, 4 × 400 m relay	
Mary Berkeley	long jump	
Ikem Billy	800m	
Mark Andrew Paul Bishop	decathlon	
Roger Black	4 × 400 m relay	
Phil Brown	400m	
Jack Buckner	5,000m	
Christina Cahill	1,500m	1 x silver
Clarence Callender	4 × 100 m relay	1 x gold
Wendy Cearns	400m hurdles	
Steve Chapman	high jump	
Linford Christie	100m, 4 × 100 m relay	2 x gold
Sebastian Coe	800m, 1500m	
Diana Davies	high jump	
Stephi Douglas	100m, 4 × 100 m relay	1 x silver
Mark Easton	30km walk	
Diane Edwards	800m	1 x gold
Jonathan Edwards	triple jump	1 x silver
Abi Ekoku	discus, shot put	
Helen Elleker	10km walk	
Peter Elliott	1,500m	1 x gold
Sally Ellis	marathon	
Louise Fraser	100m hurdles	
Stewart Faulkner	long jump	
Sharon Gibson	javelin	
Eugene Gilkes	decathlon	1 x bronze
Dalton Grant	high Jump	1 x silver
Sally Gunnell	100m hurdles, 400m hurdles, 4 × 400 m relay	2 x gold, 1 x silver
Kim Hagger	heptathlon, long jump	
Lorraine Hanson	400m hurdles	
Yvonne Hanson-Nortey	shot put	1 x bronze
Mick Hawkins	3,000m steeplechase	
Stephen John Hawkins	400m hurdles	
Paul Head	hammer throw	
John Herbert	triple jump	
Mick Hill	javelin	1 x silver
John Holman	high jump	
Angie Hulley	marathon	1 x bronze
Jill Hunter	10,000m	1 x silver
Tim Hutchings	10,000m	
Simmone Jacobs	100m, 4 × 100 m relay	1 x silver
Tony Jarrett	110m hurdles, 4 × 100 m relay	1 x gold, 1 x silver
Joanne Jennings	high jump	
Linda Keough	200m, 400m, 4 × 400 m relay	1 x gold, 1 x silver
John King	long jump	
Alex Kruger	decathlon	
Lisa Langford	10km walk	1 x bronze
Lawrence Lynch	400m hurdles, 4 × 400 m relay	
Chris Maddocks	30km walk	
Ade Mafe	200m	1 x bronze
Paul Mardle	discus	
Eamonn Martin	5,000m 10,000m	1 x gold
Fiona May	long jump	
Ian McCombie	30km walk	1 x bronze
Wayne Washington McDonald	400m	
Tony Milovsorov	marathon	
Tony Morrell	1500m	
Nicola Ann Morris	3,000m	
Joanne Mulliner	heptathlon	
David Nelson	110m hurdles	1 x bronze
Bev Nicholson	1,500m	1 x bronze
Deborah Noy	marathon	
Judy Oakes	shot Put	1 x silver
Ruth Partridge	3,000m	
Shane Peacock	hammer	
Janette Picton	discus	
Angela Piggford	400m, 4 × 400 m relay	1 x gold
John Regis	100m, 200m, 4 × 100 m relay	1 x gold, 1 x silver
Mark Roberson	javelin	
Mark Rowland	5000m	
Vernon Samuels	triple jump	
Tessa Sanderson	javelin	1 x gold
Graham Savory	discus	
Jane Shields	10,000m	
Judy Simpson	heptathlon	1 x bronze
Matt Simson	shot put	
Lesley-Ann Skeete	100m hurdles	1 x bronze
Wendy Sly	10,000m	
David Smith	hammer	1 x silver
Gary Staines	10,000m	
Jenni Stoute	200m, 400m, 4 × 100 m & 4 × 400 m relay	1 x gold, 1 x silver
Betty Sworowski	10km walk	
Hugh Teape	110m hurdles	
Carl Thackery	marathon	
Paula Thomas	100m, 200m, 4 × 100 m relay	1 x silver
Ian Tullett	pole vault	1 x silver
Colin Walker	3,000m steeplechase	1 x bronze
Eddie Wedderburn	3,000m steeplechase	
Michele Dawn Wheeler	high jump	
Geoffrey Wightman	marathon	
Ann Williams	800m	1 x silver
Barrington Williams	long jump	
Simon Williams	shot put	1 x gold
Alison Wyeth	3,000m	
Matthew Yates	800m	1 x bronze

== Badminton ==
Name	Event/s	Medal/s
Steve Baddeley	singles, mixed, team event	1 x gold
Steve Butler	singles, team event	1 x gold
Gillian Clark	singles, doubles, mixed, team event	1 x gold, 1 x silver, 1 x bronze
Andy Goode	doubles, mixed, team event	1 x gold, 1 x bronze
Gillian Gowers	doubles, mixed, team event	1 x gold, 1 x silver
Darren Hall	singles, team event	1 x gold, 1 x bronze
Miles Johnson	singles, doubles, mixed, team event	1 x gold, 1 x silver
Sara Sankey	singles, doubles, mixed, team event	2 x gold, 1 x silver
Fiona Smith	singles, doubles, team event	3 x gold
Helen Troke	singles, team event	1 x gold, 1 x bronze

== Boxing ==
Name	Event/s	Medal/s
Mickey Cantwell	-48kg light-flyweight	
Mark Edwards	-75kg middleweight	1 x bronze
Keith Howlett	-54kg bantamweight	
Jon Jo Irwin	-57kg featherweight	1 x gold
John Lyon	-51kg flyweight	
Robert McCracken	-67kg welterweight	
Pat Passley	+91kg super-heavyweight	
Peter Richardson	-60kg lightweight	
Richie Woodhall	-71kg light-middleweight	1 x gold
Monty Wright	-81kg light-heavyweight	

== Cycling ==
Name	Event/s	Medal/s
David Baker	1km time trial, points	
Maria Blower	road race	
Chris Boardman	team time trial, team pursuit	2 x bronze
Peter Boyd	match sprint	
Lisa Brambani	road race	1 x silver
David Cook	road race	
Sally Dawes	pursuit	
Linda Gornall	road race	
Jacqueline Harris	match sprint	
Adrian Hawkins	scratch race, 1km time trial	
Maxine Johnson	road race, pursuit	
Simon Lillistone	scratch race, team pursuit	1 x bronze
Peter Longbottom	road race, team time trial	1 x bronze
Ben Luckwell	team time trial	1 x bronze
Wayne Randle	road race, team time trial	1 x bronze
Roberta Rushworth	match sprint	
Bryan Steel	pursuit, team pursuit	1 x bronze
Glen Sword	scratch race, team pursuit	1 x bronze
John Tanner	road race	
Spencer Wingrave	points	

== Diving ==
Name	Event/s	Medal/s
Tony Ally	1&3m springboard & 10m platform	
Jeffrey Arbon	1&3m springboard & 10m platform	
Naomi Bishop	1&3m springboard	
Jason Statham	1&3m springboard & 10m platform	
Susan Ryan	10m platform	
Lesley Ward	10m platform	

== Gymnastics ==
Artistic

Name	Event/s	Medal/s
Terry Bartlett	all-around, horizontal bar, vault, team	1 x silver
David Cox	rings, team	1 x silver
Lisa Elliott	team	1 x bronze
Lisa Grayson	all-around, floor, uneven bars, team	1 x bronze
Lorna Mainwaring	all-around, beam, vault, team	1 x bronze
James May	all-around, floor, horizontal bar, pommel, vault, team	1 x gold, 2 x silver, 2 x bronze
Louise Redding	all-around, beam, floor, uneven bars, vault, team	1 x bronze
Neil Thomas	all-around, floor, parallel bars, pommel, team	1 x gold, 1 x silver

Rhythmic

Name	Event/s	Medal/s
Alitia Sands	all-around, hoop, ribbon	1 x bronze
Viva Seifert	all-around, ball, hoop, ribbon, rope	2 x bronze
Debbie Southwick	all-around, ball, rope	

== Judo ==
Name	Event/s	Medal/s
Mark Adshead	65kg half-lightweight	1 x bronze
Diane Bell	61kg half-middleweight	1 x gold
Karen Briggs	48kg extra-lightweight	1 x gold
Carl Finney	60kg extra-lightweight	1 x gold
Elvis Gordon	open & +95kg heavyweight	2 x gold
Ann Hughes	56kg lightweight	1 x bronze
Sharon Lee	open & +72kg heavyweight	2 x gold
Sharon Mills	66kg middleweight	1 x gold
Jane Morris	72kg half-heavyweight	1 x gold
Sharon Rendle	52kg half-lightweight	1 x gold
David Southby	78kg half-middleweight	1 x gold
Ray Stevens	95kg half-heavyweight	1 x gold
Roy Stone	71kg lightweight	1 x gold
Densign White	86kg middleweight	1 x gold

== Lawn bowls ==
Name	Event/s	Medal/s
Tony Allcock	fours	
David Bryant	singles	
Roy Cutts	fours	
Gary Harrington	fours	
Dorothy Lewis	fours	
Wendy Line	singles	
Norma May	fours	
John Ottaway	fours	
Mary Price	pairs	1 x bronze
Jayne Roylance	pairs	1 x bronze
Norma Shaw	fours	
Gary Smith	pairs	
Mavis Steele	fours	
Andy Thomson	pairs	

== Shooting ==
Name	Event/s	Medal/s
Andy Austin	skeet & pair	1 silver, 1 x bronze
Simon Belither	fullbore rifle & pair	1 x gold
David Chapman	running target	third but no medal awarded
Malcolm Cooper	50m rifle 3 Pos & pair	2 x silver
Peter Croft	trap pair	
Kevin Gill	trap & pair	1 x gold, 1 x silver
Brian Girling	rapid fire pistol	1 x bronze
Collin Greenhough	centre fire pistol & pair	
Ken Harman	skeet & pair	1 x gold, 1 x silver
Chris Hector	10m air rifle & pair	2 x silver
Bob Jarvis	free rifle prone & pair	1 x bronze
Paul Leatherdale	10m air pistol & pair, 50m free pistol & pair	
David Levene	centre fire pistol & pair	
David Lowe	10m air pistol & pair, 50m free pistol & pair	1 x bronze
John Maddison	running target	1 x silver
Gary Peacock	trap pair	
Ian Peel	trap & pair	1 x gold, 1 x bronze
John Rolfe	rapid fire pistol	1 x bronze
Philip Scanlan	free rifle prone & pair	2 x bronze
Robert Smith	10m air rifle & pair, 50m rifle 3 Pos & pair	2 x silver
Andrew Tucker	fullbore rifle & pair	1 x gold, 1 x silver

== Swimming ==
Name	Event/s	Medal/s
Stephen Akers	1500m freestyle	
Elizabeth Arnold	400/800 freestyle	
Gary Binfield	100/200 backstroke, 200 medley, relay	1 x silver
Kevin Boyd	400/1500 freestyle, relay	
Jonathan Broughton	200/400 freestyle, relay	
Suki Brownsdon	100/200 breaststroke, relay	1 x silver, 1 x bronze
Lorraine Coombes	100/200 breaststroke	
Joanna Coull	200/400 freestyle, relay	1 x silver
June Croft	100/200 freestyle, relays	1 x silver, 1 x bronze
John Davey	200 freestyle, 200/400 medley	
Sharron Davies	100 freestyle, 200 backstroke, 200 medley, relays	1 x silver, 1 x bronze
Joanne Deakins	100/200 backstroke, relay	1 x silver
Steve Dronsfield	100 freestyle, 100 butterfly, relay	1 x silver
Alyson Duffy	200 butterfly	
Mike Fibbens	50/100 freestyle, 100 butterfly, relays	2 x silver, 1 x bronze
Caroline Foot	100 butterfly	
Mark Foster	50 freestyle, relay	1 x silver, 1 x bronze
Nick Gillingham	100/200 breaststroke	2 x bronze
Jeannette Gunston	50 freestyle	
Margaret Hohmann	100/200 breaststroke	
Paul Howe	200 freestyle, relay	
Tim Jones	100/200 butterfly	
Judy Lancaster	200 freestyle, 200/400 medley, relay	1 x silver
Zara Long	200/400 medley, relay	1 x bronze
Karen Mellor	400/800 freestyle	
Neil Metcalfe	relay	1 x silver
Adrian Moorhouse	100/200 breaststroke, relay	1 x gold, 1 x silver
Matthew O'Connor	100/200 backstroke	
Peter O'Sullivan	400 medley	
James Parrack	100/200 breaststroke	1 x silver
Karen Pickering	50/100 freestyle, relays	1 x silver, 1 x bronze
Samantha Purvis	100/200 butterfly, 400 medley	
Kathy Read	100/200 backstroke	
Grant Robins	100/200 backstroke, 200 medley	
Christian Robinson	200 butterfly	
Andy Rolley	400 medley	
Madeleine Scarborough	100/200 butterfly, relay	1 x silver, 1 x bronze
Helen Slatter	100 backstroke	
Austyn Shortman	50/100 freestyle, relays	2 x silver
Ian Wilson	400/1500 freestyle	
Caroline Woodcock	50 freestyle	

== Synchronised swimming ==
Name	Event/s	Medal/s
Sarah Northey	duet	1 x silver
Kerry Shacklock	solo & duet	2 x silver

== Weightlifting ==
Name	Event/s	Medal/s
Keith Boxell	90kg middle-heavyweight	3 x silver
Andrew Callard	82.5kg light-heavyweight	
Duncan Dawkins	90kg middle-heavyweight	3 x gold
Sabhijinder Singh Hayer	60kg featherweight	
Geoff Laws	60kg featherweight	
Peter May	100kg sub-heavyweight	3 x silver
Andrew Saxton	110kg sub-heavyweight	3 x gold
Mark Thomas	110kg heavyweight	3 x gold
Matthew Vine	+110kg super-heavyweight	
John Willson	+110kg super-heavyweight	
