= John Rolfe (sport shooter) =

British former sports shooter

Sport
- Sport: Sports shooting
- Club: Haverfordwest Target Shooting Club
Medal record
Representing England
Commonwealth Games
Bronze medal – third place	1990 Auckland	25m rapid fire pistol pairs

John Rolfe is a British former sports shooter.

== Sports shooting career ==
Rolfe represented England and won a bronze medal in the 25 metres rapid fire pistol pairs with Brian Girling, at the 1990 Commonwealth Games in Auckland, New Zealand.
