= Bangladesh at the 2018 Commonwealth Games =

- Flag of Bangladesh
- CG code: BAN
- CGA: Bangladesh Olympic Association
- Website: nocban.com

in Gold Coast, Australia 4 April 2018 – 15 April 2018
- Competitors: 23 in 5 sports
- Flag bearer: Abdullah Hel Baki (opening)
- Medals Ranked 30th: Gold 0 Silver 2 Bronze 0 Total 2

Commonwealth Games appearances (overview)
- 1978; 1982–1986; 1990; 1994; 1998; 2002; 2006; 2010; 2014; 2018; 2022; 2026; 2030

Bangladesh competed at the 2018 Commonwealth Games in the Gold Coast, Australia from April 4 to April 15, 2018. It was Bangladesh's 9th appearance at the Commonwealth Games.

Sport shooter Abdullah Hel Baki was the country's flag bearer during the opening ceremony.

== Medalists ==
Medal	Name	Sport	Event	Date
Silver	Abdullah Hel Baki	Shooting	Men's 10 m Air Rifle	April 8
Silver	Shakil Ahmed	Shooting	Men's 50 m Pistol	April 11

== Competitors ==
The following is the list of number of competitors participating at the Games per sport/discipline.

Sport	Men	Women	Total
Athletics	1	1	2
Shooting	5	6	11
Swimming	2	1	3
Weightlifting	1	4	5
Wrestling	1	1	2
Total	10	13	23

== Athletics ==
Bangladesh participated with 2 athletes (1 man and 1 woman).

Track & road events

Athlete	Event	Heat		Semifinal		Final	
Athlete	Event	Result	Rank	Result	Rank	Result	Rank
Masbah Ahmmed	Men's 100 m	10.96	5	Did not advance			
Shirin Akter	Women's 100 m	12.72	6	Did not advance			
Shirin Akter	Women's 200 m	26.17	8	Did not advance			

== Shooting ==
Bangladesh participated with 12 athletes (6 men and 6 women).

Men

Athlete	Event	Qualification		Final	
Athlete	Event	Points	Rank	Points	Rank
Abdullah Hel Baki	50 metre rifle 3 positions	DNS		Did not advance	
Mohammad Chowdhury	50 metre rifle 3 positions	1144	10	Did not advance	
Abdullah Hel Baki	50 metre rifle prone	DNS		Did not advance	
Mohammad Chowdhury	50 metre rifle prone	604.5	20	Did not advance	
Abdullah Hel Baki	10 metre air rifle	616.0	6 Q	244.7	2nd place, silver medalist(s)
Mohammad Rabbi Munna	10 metre air rifle	607.6	14	Did not advance	
Shakil Ahmed	50 metre pistol	545	4 Q	220.5	2nd place, silver medalist(s)
Mohammad Anowar Hossain	50 metre pistol	528	10	Did not advance	
Shakil Ahmed	10 metre air pistol	563	8 Q	150.1	6
Mohammad Anowar Hossain	10 metre air pistol	555	13	Did not advance	

Women

Athlete	Event	Qualification		Final	
Athlete	Event	Points	Rank	Points	Rank
Suraiya Akter	50 metre rifle 3 positions	570	13	Did not advance	
Sarmin Shilpa	50 metre rifle 3 positions	570	12	Did not advance	
Suraiya Akter	50 metre rifle prone	—N/a		604.3	14
Sarmin Shilpa	50 metre rifle prone	—N/a		599.2	17
Sayeda Hasan	10 metre air rifle	407.4	10	Did not advance	
Ummey Sultana	10 metre air rifle	410.5	6 Q	202.5	4
Armin Asha	10 metre air pistol	359	17	Did not advance	
Ardina Ferdous	10 metre air pistol	373	9	Did not advance	

== Swimming ==
Bangladesh participated with 3 athletes (2 men and 1 woman).

Men

Athlete	Event	Heat		Semifinal		Final	
Athlete	Event	Time	Rank	Time	Rank	Time	Rank
Mohammad Islam	50 m breaststroke	30.37	23	Did not advance			
Mohammad Islam	100 m breaststroke	1:07.51	20	Did not advance			
Mohammad Nahid	50 m butterfly	26.56	38	Did not advance			
Mohammad Nahid	100 m butterfly	56.94	21	Did not advance			

Women

Athlete	Event	Heat		Semifinal		Final	
Athlete	Event	Time	Rank	Time	Rank	Time	Rank
Miss Khatun	50 m freestyle	31.10	37	Did not advance			
Miss Khatun	50 m butterfly	32.96	28	Did not advance			

== Weightlifting ==
Bangladesh participated with five athletes (one man and four women).

Athlete	Event	Snatch		Clean & jerk		Total	Rank
Athlete	Event	Result	Rank	Result	Rank	Total	Rank
Shimul Singha	Men's −69 kg	115	10	Did not finish			
Fullapati Chakma	Women's −53 kg	68	12	85	12	153	12
Fayema Akther	Women's −58 kg	66	11	88	12	154	13
Mabia Aktar	Women's −63 kg	78	7	102	4	180	6
Jukora Nisha	Women's −75 kg	65	12	90	12	155	12

== Wrestling ==
Bangladesh participated with 2 athletes (1 man and 1 woman).

Men

Athlete	Event	Round of 16	Quarterfinal	Semifinal	Repechage	Final / BM	
Athlete	Event	Opposition Result	Opposition Result	Opposition Result	Opposition Result	Opposition Result	Rank
Mohammad Ali Amzad	-74 kg	Teetu (KIR); W 4 - 0	Assizecourt (NGR); L 0 - 5	Did not advance			8

Women

Athlete	Event	Group stage			Semifinal	Final / BM	
Athlete	Event	Opposition Result	Opposition Result	Rank	Opposition Result	Opposition Result	Rank
Sherin Sultana	-68 kg	Nthiga (KEN); W 5 - 0	Oborududu (NGR); L 0 - 5	2 Q	Lappage (CAN); L 0 - 4	Kakran (IND); L 0 - 5	4

== See also ==
- Bangladesh at the 2018 Summer Youth Olympics
