= 1990 European Men's Artistic Gymnastics Championships =

19th European Men's Artistic Gymnastics Championships
- Location: Lausanne, Switzerland
- Start date: 25 May 1990
- End date: 27 May 1990

The 19th European Men's Artistic Gymnastics Championships was held in Lausanne, Switzerland from 25–27 May 1990.

== Medalists ==
Event	Gold	Silver	Bronze
All-around	(Soviet Union) Valentin Mogilny	(Soviet Union) Sergey Kharkov	(Italy) Jury Chechi
Floor	(Soviet Union) Vitaly Scherbo	(Soviet Union) Sergey Kharkov	(Romania) Adrian Gal
Pommel horse	(Soviet Union) Valentin Mogilny	(East Germany) Jens Milbradt	(Soviet Union) Sergey Kharkov
Rings	(Italy) Jury Chechi	(East Germany) Jens Milbradt	(Hungary) Szilveszter Csollány
Vault	(Soviet Union) Vitaly Scherbo	(East Germany) Ralf Büchner	(United Kingdom) Neil Thomas
Parallel bars	(Soviet Union) Valentin Mogilny (Switzerland) Daniel Giubellini	Not awarded	(Bulgaria) Kalofer Khristozov (East Germany) André Hempel
Horizontal bar	(Soviet Union) Vitaly Scherbo	(Switzerland) René Plüss	(East Germany) Ralf Büchner (Socialist Federal Republic of Yugoslavia) Jože Kolman

=== Medal table ===
Rank	Nation	Gold	Silver	Bronze	Total
1	Soviet Union (URS)	6	2	1	9
2	Switzerland (SUI)	1	1	0	2
3	Italy (ITA)	1	0	1	2
4	East Germany (GDR)	0	3	2	5
5	Bulgaria (BUL)	0	0	1	1
5	Great Britain (GBR)	0	0	1	1
5	Hungary (HUN)	0	0	1	1
5	Romania (ROM)	0	0	1	1
5	Yugoslavia (YUG)	0	0	1	1
Totals (9 entries)		8	6	9	23

== Results ==
=== All Around ===
All competitors took part in the all-around with no prior qualification. Here are the top 10 finishes.

Rank	Athlete	Nation	Apparatus						Total
Rank	Athlete	Nation	F	PH	R	V	PB	HB	Total
1st place, gold medalist(s)	Valentin Mogilny	Soviet Union (URS)	9.600	9.900	9.700	9.600	9.850	9.800	58.450
2nd place, silver medalist(s)	Sergey Kharkov	Soviet Union (URS)	9.900	9.800	9.550	9.650	9.750	9.650	58.300
3rd place, bronze medalist(s)	Jury Chechi	Italy (ITA)	9.650	9.650	9.800	9.750	9.700	9.650	58.200
4	Kalofer Khristozov	Bulgaria (BUL)	9.800	9.600	9.600	9.550	9.750	9.600	57.900
5	Vitaly Scherbo	Soviet Union (URS)	9.750	9.550	9.550	9.900	9.100	9.700	57.550
6	Csaba Fajkusz	Hungary (HUN)	9.500	9.600	9.450	9.500	9.550	9.550	57.150
7	Ralf Büchner	East Germany (GDR)	9.250	9.300	9.650	9.700	9.550	9.650	57.100
7	Boris Preti	Italy (ITA)	9.650	9.500	9.600	9.500	9.650	9.200	57.100
9	Marius Gherman	Romania (ROM)	9.600	9.600	9.550	9.600	9.050	9.600	57.000
9	Daniel Giubellini	Switzerland (SUI)	9.500	9.400	9.500	9.400	9.600	9.600	57.000

=== Floor ===
Rank	Gymnast	Total
1st place, gold medalist(s)	(Soviet Union) Vitaly Scherbo	9.825
2nd place, silver medalist(s)	(Soviet Union) Sergey Kharkov	9.800
3rd place, bronze medalist(s)	(Romania) Adrian Gal	9.700
4	(Romania) Marius Gherman	9.637
5	(Italy) Jury Chechi	9.600
6	(Bulgaria) Kalofer Khristozov	9.512
7	(Italy) Boris Preti	9.487
8	(United Kingdom) Neil Thomas	9.400

=== Pommel horse ===
Rank	Gymnast	Total
1st place, gold medalist(s)	(Soviet Union) Valentin Mogilny	9.937
2nd place, silver medalist(s)	(East Germany) Jens Milbradt	9.837
3rd place, bronze medalist(s)	(Soviet Union) Sergey Kharkov	9.800
4	(Bulgaria) Kalofer Khristozov	9.775
5	(Italy) Jury Chechi	9.700
6	(Hungary) Csaba Fajkusz	9.637
7	(Bulgaria) Dimitar Taskov	9.225
8	(Sweden) Johan Jonasson	9.100

=== Rings ===
Rank	Gymnast	Total
1st place, gold medalist(s)	(Italy) Jury Chechi	9.837
2nd place, silver medalist(s)	(East Germany) Jens Milbradt	9.712
3rd place, bronze medalist(s)	(Hungary) Szilveszter Csollány	9.687
4	(Bulgaria) Kalofer Khristozov	9.675
5	(Italy) Boris Preti	9.662
5	(Soviet Union) Valentin Mogilny	9.662
7	(Soviet Union) Sergey Kharkov	9.600
8	(East Germany) Ralf Büchner	9.562

=== Vault ===
Rank	Gymnast	Total
1st place, gold medalist(s)	(Soviet Union) Vitaly Scherbo	9.943
2nd place, silver medalist(s)	(East Germany) Ralf Büchner	9.724
3rd place, bronze medalist(s)	(United Kingdom) Neil Thomas	9.625
4	(United Kingdom) James May	9.593
5	(Romania) Marius Gherman	9.556
6	(Soviet Union) Sergey Kharkov	9.375
7	(Hungary) Szilveszter Csollány	9.275
8	(Italy) Jury Chechi	9.175

=== Parallel bars ===
Rank	Gymnast	Total
1st place, gold medalist(s)	(Switzerland) Daniel Giubellini	9.800
1st place, gold medalist(s)	(Soviet Union) Valentin Mogilny	9.800
3rd place, bronze medalist(s)	(East Germany) André Hempel	9.750
3rd place, bronze medalist(s)	(Bulgaria) Kalofer Khristozov	9.750
5	(Soviet Union) Sergey Kharkov	9.725
6	(Bulgaria) Dimitar Taskov	9.687
7	(Italy) Jury Chechi	9.650
8	(Italy) Boris Preti	9.400

=== Horizontal bar ===
Rank	Gymnast	Total
1st place, gold medalist(s)	(Soviet Union) Vitaly Scherbo	9.912
2nd place, silver medalist(s)	(Switzerland) René Plüss	9.825
3rd place, bronze medalist(s)	(East Germany) Ralf Büchner	9.800
3rd place, bronze medalist(s)	(Socialist Federal Republic of Yugoslavia) Jože Kolman	9.800
5	(Soviet Union) Sergey Kharkov	9.787
6	(Bulgaria) Kalofer Khristozov	9.675
6	(Italy) Jury Chechi	9.675
8	(France) Patrice Casimir	9.562
