= Bangladesh at the 2006 Commonwealth Games =

- CG code: BAN
- CGA: Bangladesh Olympic Association
- Website: nocban.com

in Melbourne, Australia
- Competitors: 20
- Flag bearers: Opening: Closing:
- Medals: Gold 0 Silver 1 Bronze 0 Total 1

Commonwealth Games appearances (overview)
- 1978; 1982–1986; 1990; 1994; 1998; 2002; 2006; 2010; 2014; 2018; 2022; 2026; 2030

The Official Logo of the Bangladesh Commonwealth Games Association

Bangladesh was represented at the 2006 Commonwealth Games in Melbourne by 19 athletes competing in 5 disciplines. They won one medal, in shooting.

The flag bearer for the opening ceremony was shooter Saiful Alam.

Shooter Toufiqur Rahman groped a female worker in a gymnasium at the athlete's village. He was fined AU$1000 by the Melbourne Magistrates' Court and received a lifetime ban from national or international competition by the Bangladesh Olympic Association.

Runner Mohammad Tawhidul Islam, after failing to qualify for the men's 400m finals, disappeared from the athletes' village. Later he was one of 26 athletes or officials from the games (mostly from African countries) to seek asylum in Australia.

== Medals ==
| | (gold) | (silver) | (bronze) | Total |
|---|---|---|---|---|
| Bangladesh | 0 | 1 | 0 | 1 |

=== Silver ===
Shooting:

(silver) Asif Hossain Khan & Anjan Kumer Singha, Men's 10m Air Rifle Pairs

== Bangladesh's Commonwealth Games team 2006 ==
=== Aquatics ===
==== Swimming ====
- Jewel Ahmed
- Monirul Kazi
- Sobura Khatun
- Mohammad Rana

=== Athletics ===
- Foujia Huda
- Mohammad Tawhidul Islam
- Shahidul Islam Khan

=== Shooting ===
- Sharmin Akhter
- Suraiya Akter
- Saiful Alam
- Asif Hossain Khan
- Sree Mohendra Kumar Singha
- M Taufiqur Rahman
- Anjan Kumer Singha
- Sabrina Sultana

=== Table Tennis ===
- Fareda Akter Asma

=== Weightlifting ===
- Akramul Haque
- Md Hamidul Islam
- Molla Shabira
