= Shooting at the 1984 Summer Olympics – Men's 50 metre running target =

Sports shooting at the Olympics

Men's 50 metre running target at the Games of the XXIII Olympiad
- Venue: Los Angeles, United States
- Date: July 31, 1984
- Competitors: 23 from 15 nations

Medalists
1st place, gold medalist(s)		Li Yuwei	China
2nd place, silver medalist(s)		Helmut Bellingrodt	Colombia
3rd place, bronze medalist(s)		Huang Shiping	China

The men's 50 metre running target was a shooting sports event held as part of the Shooting at the 1984 Summer Olympics programme. The competition was held on July 31, 1984, at the shooting ranges in Los Angeles. 23 shooters from 15 nations competed.

== Results ==
Place	Shooter	Total
1	Li Yuwei (CHN)	587
2	Helmut Bellingrodt (COL)	584
3	Huang Shiping (CHN)	581
4	Uwe Schröder (FRG)	581
5	David Lee (CAN)	580
6	Kenneth Skoglund (NOR)	576
7	Jorma Lievonen (FIN)	576
8	Ezio Cini (ITA)	576
9	Randy Stewart (USA)	575
10	Jean-Luc Tricoire (FRA)	575
11	Horst Bellingrodt (COL)	574
12	Erland Johansson (SWE)	573
13	Todd Bensley (USA)	572
14	Giovanni Mezzani (ITA)	570
15	David Chapman (GBR)	569
16	Carlos Silva (GUA)	565
17	Bryan Wilson (AUS)	564
18	Arturo Iglesias (GUA)	563
19	Tony Clarke (NZL)	558
20	Mark Bedlington (CAN)	554
21	David Abibssira (FRA)	552
22	Michael Meggison (GBR)	526
AC	Rangsit Yanothai (THA)	
