= Shooting at the 2018 Commonwealth Games – Men's 10 metre air pistol =

Shooting – Men's 10 metre air pistol at the 2018 Commonwealth Games
- Venue: Belmont Shooting Centre, Brisbane
- Dates: 9 April 2018
- Competitors: 24 from 16 nations

Medalists
gold medal	Jitu Rai	India
silver medal	Kerry Bell	Australia
bronze medal	Om Mitharval	India

The Men's 10 metre air pistol event took place on 9 April 2018 at the Belmont Shooting Centre. Jitu Rai won the gold medal with a Games Record score. Kerry Bell won the silver medal and Om Mitharval won the bronze. Defending champion Daniel Repacholi came in 4th.

== Results ==
=== Preliminares ===
Rank	Name	Country	1	2	ex 200	3	ex 300	4	ex 400	5	ex 500	6	Final	Notes
1	Om Mitharval	India	96	96	192	98	290	99	389	96	485	99	584-26x	Q
2	Roger Daniel	Trinidad and Tobago	93	94	187	96	283	95	378	98	476	96	572-17x	Q
3	Johnathan Wong	Malaysia	95	95	190	96	286	96	382	93	475	95	570-18x	Q
4	Jitu Rai	India	98	92	190	94	284	96	380	95	475	95	570-15x	Q
5	Bin Gai	Singapore	97	91	188	95	283	94	377	96	473	97	570-14x	Q
6	Daniel Repacholi	Australia	93	93	186	95	281	95	376	95	471	95	566-15x	Q
7	Kerry Bell	Australia	91	96	187	96	283	97	380	92	472	92	564-9x	Q
8	Shakil Ahmed	Bangladesh	96	92	188	94	282	94	376	92	468	95	563-14x	Q
9	Thanthulage Fernando	Sri Lanka	93	94	187	96	283	92	375	92	467	96	563-11x	
10	Kristian Callaghan	England	91	93	184	93	277	94	371	94	465	97	562-11x	
11	Poh Yu Hao	Singapore	95	90	185	89	274	95	369	94	463	97	560-8x	
12	Aedan Evans	Scotland	91	92	183	93	276	99	375	91	466	93	559-12x	
13	Md Anowar Hossain	Bangladesh	93	95	188	93	281	93	374	94	468	87	555-11x	
14	Daniel Payas	Gibraltar	93	90	183	91	274	93	367	92	459	95	554-8x	
15	Craig Auden	Wales	88	89	177	91	268	96	364	93	457	94	551-11x	
16	Rhodney Allen	Trinidad and Tobago	91	91	182	90	272	91	363	94	457	94	551-9x	
17	Jonathan Patron	Gibraltar	93	90	183	89	272	91	363	88	451	91	542-3x	
18	Bernard Chase	Barbados	87	87	174	91	265	93	358	87	445	92	537-9x	
19	Nevin Middleton	Falkland Islands	93	81	174	89	263	91	354	90	444	92	536-1x	
20	Douglas Creek	Norfolk Island	87	88	175	89	264	85	349	84	433	90	523-3x	
21	Ronald Sargeant	Barbados	86	90	176	88	264	83	347	87	434	85	519-5x	
22	Murray Middleton	Falkland Islands	83	82	165	86	251	87	338	89	427	87	514-6x	
23	Kevin Coultier	Norfolk Island	79	79	158	86	244	73	317	87	404	76	480-4x	
24	Dovar Moultrie	Turks and Caicos Islands	77	86	163	79	242	68	310	67	377	63	440-0x	

=== Final ===
The full final results were:

Rank	Name	Country	1	2	1-2	3	1-3	4	1-4	5	1-5	6	1-6	7	1-7	8	1-8	9	1-9	Final	Notes
1st place, gold medalist(s)	Jitu Rai	India	49.7	50.7	100.4	20.6	121.0	18.6	139.6	19.4	159.0	18.7	177.7	19.3	197.0	19.7	216.7	18.4	235.1	235.1	GR
2nd place, silver medalist(s)	Kerry Bell	Australia	47.6	50.8	98.4	18.3	116.7	18.9	135.6	19.0	154.6	20.0	174.6	20.7	195.3	20.0	215.3	18.2	233.5	233.5	
3rd place, bronze medalist(s)	Om Mitharval	India	49.0	49.1	98.1	20.2	118.3	19.5	137.8	19.0	156.8	19.4	176.2	19.2	195.4	18.9	214.3	-	-	214.3	
4	Daniel Repacholi	Australia	47.7	48.6	96.3	18.6	114.9	19.5	134.4	20.2	154.6	20.0	174.6	18.8	193.4	-	-	-	-	193.4	
5	Roger Daniel	Trinidad and Tobago	48.4	48.3	96.7	18.5	115.2	18.8	134.0	20.3	154.3	16.3	170.6	-	-	-	-	-	-	170.6	
6	Shakil Ahmed	Bangladesh	48.3	47.0	95.3	19.4	114.7	20.1	134.8	15.3	150.1	-	-	-	-	-	-	-	-	150.1	
7	Bin Gai	Singapore	47.7	48.7	96.4	19.8	116.2	17.7	133.9	−	-	-	-	-	-	-	-	-	-	133.9	
8	Johnathan Wong	Malaysia	43.8	48.2	92.0	20.0	112.0	-	-	-	-	-	-	-	-	-	-	-	-	112.0	
