= Tim Dodds =

New Zealand sport shooter

Personal information
- Born: Timothy Andrew Dodds; 28 January 1962 (age 64) Gore, New Zealand
- Education: Gore High School

Sport
- Country: New Zealand
- Sport: Shooting
Medal record
Men's shooting
Representing New Zealand
Commonwealth Games
Bronze medal – third place	1990 Auckland	Skeet pairs

Timothy Andrew Dodds (born 28 January 1962) is a New Zealand sport shooter, who won a bronze medal representing his country at the 1990 Commonwealth Games.

== Biography ==
Born in Gore on 28 January 1962, Dodds was educated at Gore High School.

Dodds competed for New Zealand at the 1990 Commonwealth Games in Auckland. He won a bronze medal with John Woolley in the men's skeet pairs, and finished in 11th place in the men's individual skeet.

In 1990, Dodds was awarded the New Zealand 1990 Commemoration Medal. The same year he was named Southland senior sportsperson of the year.
