= David Lowe (sport shooter) =

British former sports shooter

Sport
- Sport: Sports shooting
Medal record
Representing England
Commonwealth Games
Bronze medal – third place	1990 Auckland	10m air pistol

David Lowe is a British former sports shooter.

== Sports shooting career ==
Lowe represented England in four events and won a bronze medal in the 10 metres air pistol event, at the 1990 Commonwealth Games in Auckland, New Zealand.
