= Shooting at the 2026 Commonwealth Games =

- Venue: To Be Announced

Shooting competitions were confirmed for the 2026 Commonwealth Games programme, that was to be held in Victoria, Australia. In July 2023, Victoria announced it had cancelled its plans to host the games citing an escalation in its cost projections relative to initial estimations. The Games were scheduled to take place from the 17 to 29 March 2026. As of July 2023, the Commonwealth Games Federation were seeking a new host.

== Background ==
In July 2022, the organising committee for the 2026 Commonwealth Games released the sporting programme for the games. Like Birmingham 2022 it did not include shooting. Following the controversy surrounding the exclusion of Shooting at Birmingham, India expressed strong disappointment and raised the matter during the Birmingham Games with visiting organisers from Victoria.

In August 2022 the Expression of Interest (EOI) period for additional sports opened and Shooting Australia announced that the ISSF had submitted a proposal for shooting. Like the proposals for the 2022 Games, the programme was heavily restricted. The proposal included just four disciplines - Trap, Air Rifle, Air Pistol and Fullbore Rifle. This dropped cartridge pistol, 50m rifle, and skeet. Para-Shooting events were also included in the bid, though it was not specified whether these were limited to airgun disciplines or included Para-Trap, which had demonstrated at the 2017 CSF(ED) Championships in Wales.

In October 2022, the inclusion of Shooting was confirmed, but without Fullbore Rifle. It was later announced that Shooting would be held in the Gippsland region, east of Melbourne. The proposal had originally been based in Greater Bendigo, north of Melbourne. This was to use the Wellsford Fullbore Rifle Range (which also hosted the 2006 Commonwealth Games fullbore events). With the exclusion of Fullbore Rifle, the events were no longer tied to the Bendigo area.

== Medalists ==
=== Men ===
Event	Gold	Silver	Bronze
10 metre air pistol			
10 metre air rifle			
Trap			

=== Women ===
Event	Gold	Silver	Bronze
10 metre air pistol			
10 metre air rifle			
Trap			

=== Mixed Pairs ===
Event	Gold	Silver	Bronze
10 metre air pistol			
10 metre air rifle			
Trap			
