= Ralf Büchner =

East German gymnast (born 1967)

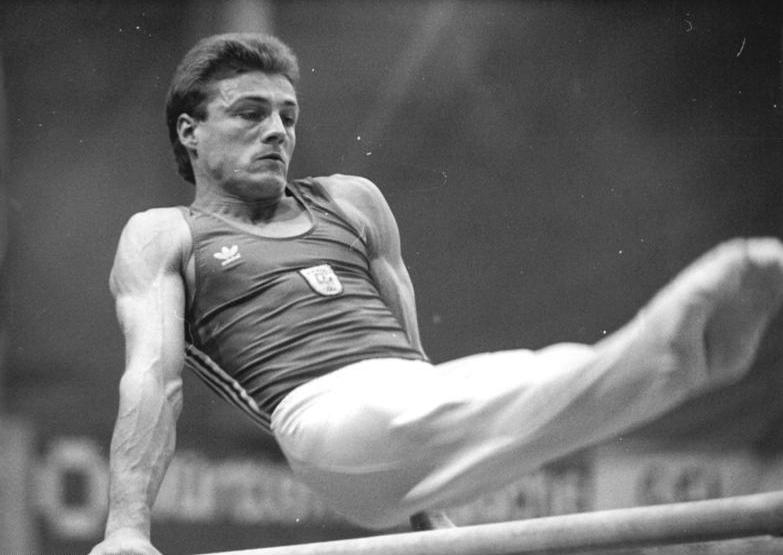
- Ralf Büchner in 1990

Personal information
- Born: 31 August 1967 (age 59) East Berlin, East Germany
- Height: 1.63 m (5 ft 4 in)

Gymnastics career
- Discipline: Men's artistic gymnastics
- Country represented: Germany
- Former countries represented: East Germany (until 1990)
- Club: ASK Vorwärts Potsdam
Medal record
Representing East Germany
Olympic Games
Silver medal – second place	1988 Seoul	Team
European Championships
Silver medal – second place	1990 Lausanne	Vault
Bronze medal – third place	1990 Lausanne	Horizontal bar
Representing Germany
World Championships
Gold medal – first place	1991 Indianapolis	Horizontal bar
Bronze medal – third place	1991 Indianapolis	Team
European Championships
Bronze medal – third place	1992 Budapest	Pommel horse
Bronze medal – third place	1994 Prague	Team

Ralf Büchner (born 31 August 1967) is a retired German gymnast. He competed at the 1988 and 1992 Summer Olympics and finished in second and fourth place with the East German team, respectively. His best individual achievement was ninth place in the vault in 1988. He won a gold and a bronze medal at the World Championships in 1991, as well as four medals at the European Championships in 1990, 1992 and 1994.
