= Gymnastics at the 1990 Commonwealth Games =

- Venue: Chase Stadium, Kohimarama
- Location: Auckland, New Zealand
- Dates: 24 January – 3 February 1990

Gymnastics at the 1990 Commonwealth Games was the second appearance of the Gymnastics at the Commonwealth Games but the debut of Rhythmic gymnastics. The events were held in Auckland, New Zealand, from 24 January to 3 February 1990 and featured 19 events.

The gymnastics events were held at Chase Stadium in Kohimarama.

Canada topped the gymnastics medal table by virtue of winning 14 gold medals.

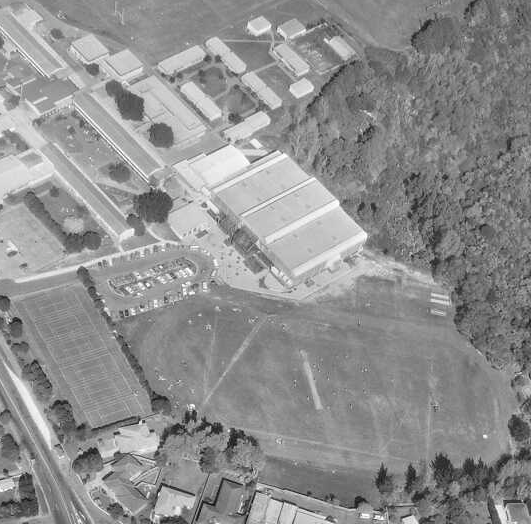
1988 aerial view of Chase Stadium Whites Aviation Ltd

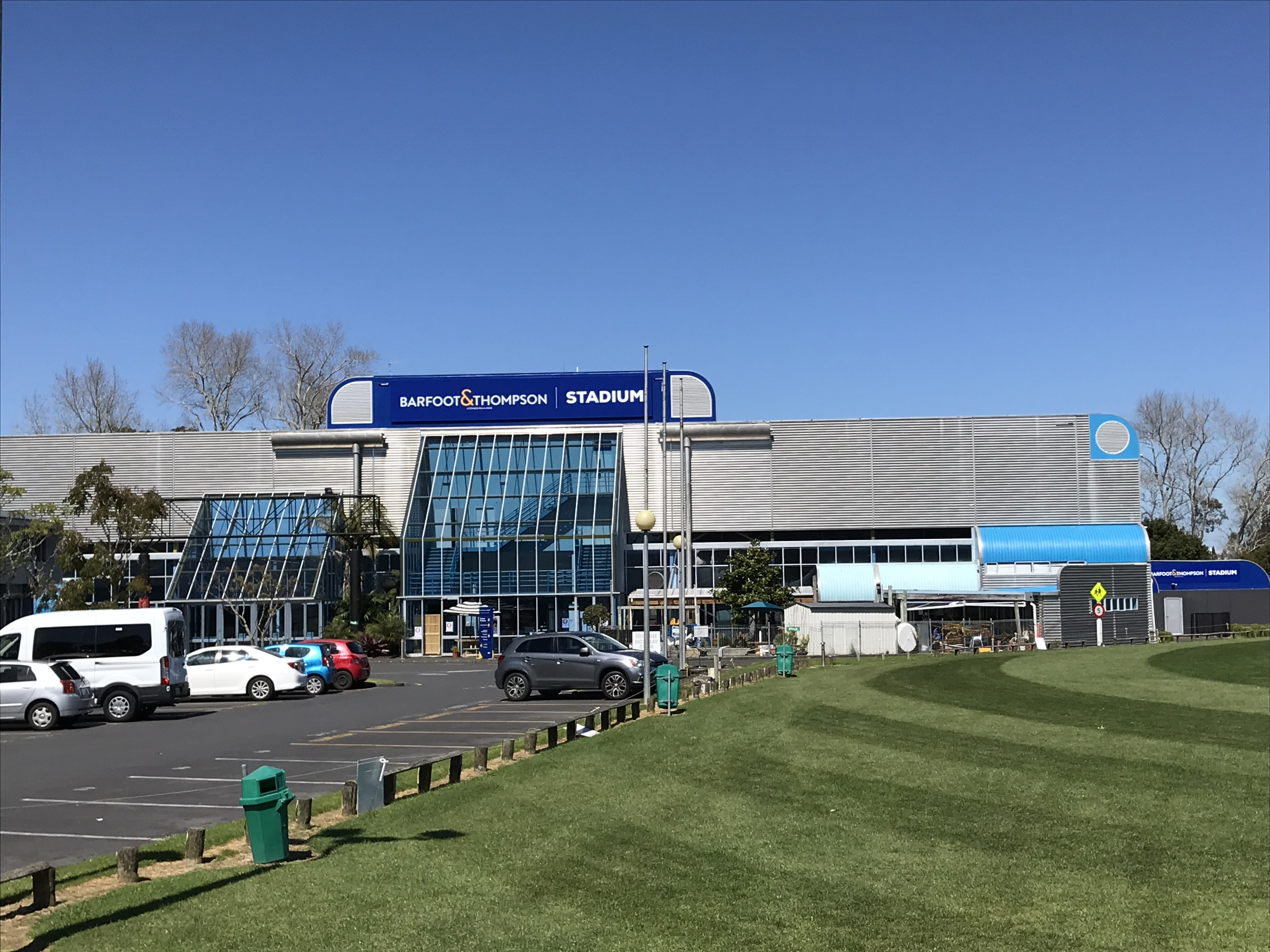
The stadium in 2021

== Medal table ==
* Host nation (New Zealand)

Medals won by nation with totals, ranked by number of golds—sortable
Rank	Nation	Gold	Silver	Bronze	Total
1	Canada	14	12	2	28
2	Australia	2	4	10	16
3	England	2	2	6	10
4	New Zealand*	2	0	5	7
Totals (4 entries)		20	18	23	61

== Medallists ==
=== Artistic ===
Men's events

Event	Gold		Silver		Bronze	
All-Around	Curtis Hibbert (CAN)	57.95	Alan Nolet (CAN)	57.8	James May (ENG)	57.4
Team	Canada; Alan Nolet; Claude Latendrese; Curtis Hibbert; Lorne Bobkin	171.8	England; David Cox; James May; Neil Thomas; Terence Bartlett	170.45	Australia; Brennon Dowrick; Kenneth Meredith; Peter Hogan; Tim Lees	169.5
Horizontal Bar	Curtis Hibbert (CAN); Alan Nolet (CAN)	9.85			Brennon Dowrick (AUS)	9.8
Parallel Bars	Curtis Hibbert (CAN)	9.8	Ken Meredith (AUS)	9.675	Peter Hogan (AUS)	9.6
Vault	James May (ENG)	9.625	Curtis Hibbert (CAN)	9.575	Tim Lees (AUS)	9.25
Pommel Horse	Brennon Dowrick (AUS)	9.825	Tim Lees (AUS)	9.725	James May (ENG)	9.7
Rings	Curtis Hibbert (CAN)	9.775	James May (ENG)	9.75	Ken Meredith (AUS)	9.725
Floor	Neil Thomas (ENG)	9.75	Alan Nolet (CAN)	9.675	Curtis Hibbert (CAN)	9.6

Women's events

Event	Gold		Silver		Bronze	
All-Around	Lori Strong (CAN)	38.912	Monique Allen (AUS)	38.687	Kylie Shadbolt (AUS)	38.499
Team	Canada; Janet Morin; Larissa Lowing; Lori Strong; Stella Umeh	116.784	Australia; Kylie Shadbolt; Lisa Read; Michelle Telfer; Monique Allen	115.272	England; Lisa Elliott; Lisa Grayson; Lorna Mainwaring; Louise Redding	114.046
Asymmetric Bars	Monique Allen (AUS)	9.875	Lori Strong (CAN)	9.85	Michelle Telfer (AUS)	9.737
Beam	Lori Strong (CAN)	9.85	Larissa Lowing (CAN)	9.762	Kylie Shadbolt (AUS)	9.7
Vault	Nikki Jenkins (NZL)	9.712	Lori Strong (CAN)	9.643	Monique Allen (AUS)	9.506
Floor	Lori Strong (CAN)	9.887	Larissa Lowing (CAN)	9.762	Kylie Shadbolt (AUS)	9.675

=== Rhythmic ===
Event	Gold		Silver		Bronze	
Women
All-Around	Mary Fuzesi (CAN)	37.65	Madonna Gimotea (CAN)	37.25	Angela Walker (NZL)	36.9
Ball	Madonna Gimotea (CAN)	9.45	Mary Fuzesi (CAN)	9.4	Angela Walker (NZL)	9.25
Hoop	Mary Fuzesi (CAN)	9.4	Madonna Gimotea (CAN)	9.2	Raewyn Jack (NZL); Alitia Sands (ENG); Viva Seifert (ENG)	9.1
Ribbon	Mary Fuzesi (CAN)	9.4	Madonna Gimotea (CAN)	9.3	Raewyn Jack (NZL); Viva Seifert (ENG); Angela Walker (NZL)	9.2
Rope	Angela Walker (NZL)	9.3	Madonna Gimotea (CAN)	9.275	Mary Fuzesi (CAN)	9.25
