= Ian Peel =

British sport shooter

Personal information
- Born: 18 January 1958 (age 68) Skipton-on-Swale, North Yorkshire, England

Sport
- Sport: Sports shooting
- Club: East Yorkshire Gun Club, Beverley
Medal record
Men's shooting
Representing Great Britain
Olympic Games
Silver medal – second place	2000 Sydney	Trap
Representing England
Commonwealth Games
Gold medal – first place	1986 Edinburgh	trap
Gold medal – first place	1986 Edinburgh	trap pairs
Gold medal – first place	1990 Auckland	trap pairs
Bronze medal – third place	1990 Auckland	trap
Silver medal – second place	1998 Kuala Lumpur	trap pairs
Silver medal – second place	1998 Kuala Lumpur	Olympic trap
Bronze medal – third place	1998 Kuala Lumpur	Olympic trap pairs
Silver medal – second place	2002 Manchester	Olympic trap pairs

Ian R Peel (born 18 January 1958) is a British sport shooter who has represented Great Britain in the Summer Olympic Games on three occasions.

== Sport shooting career ==
Peel first appeared at the Olympics in the 1988 Games in Seoul where he finished 25th in the mixed trap event. Twelve years later he competed in the 2000 Summer Olympics in Sydney and won the silver medal in the men's trap. He participated in his third Games in Athens in 2004 finishing tied for 19th in the men's trap.

He represented England and won two gold medals in the trap and trap pairs with Peter Boden, at the 1986 Commonwealth Games in Edinburgh, Scotland. Four years later represented England and won a gold medal in the trap pairs with Kevin Gill and a bronze medal in the individual trap, at the 1990 Commonwealth Games in Auckland, New Zealand. After missing the 1994 games he competed in his third Games at the 1998 Commonwealth Games where he once again won medals in the trap events; two silvers and a bronze with Bob Borsley. A fourth and final appearance at the 2002 Commonwealth Games resulted in his eighth medal after a winning a pairs silver with Christopher Dean.
