= Angela Walker (rhythmic gymnast) =

New Zealand rhythmic gymnast

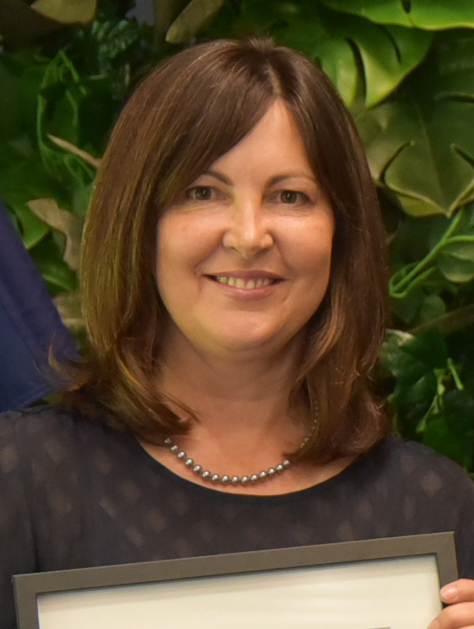
- Walker (now Subramaniam) in 2020

Personal information
- Full name: Angela Gaye Walker
- Born: 19 March 1967 (age 59) Auckland, New Zealand
- Height: 166 cm (5 ft 5 in) (at the 1988 Olympics)
- Spouse: Kannan Subramaniam (m. 1995)

Gymnastics career
- Discipline: Rhythmic gymnastics
- Country represented: New Zealand
Medal record
Women's rhythmic gymnastics
Commonwealth Games
Gold medal – first place	1990 Auckland	Rope
Bronze medal – third place	1990 Auckland	Ball
Bronze medal – third place	1990 Auckland	Ribbon
Bronze medal – third place	1990 Auckland	All-around

Angela Gaye Walker (married name Subramaniam; born 19 March 1967) is a New Zealand writer and former rhythmic gymnast. She competed at the 1988 Summer Olympics and won a gold medal and three bronze medals at the 1990 Commonwealth Games.

== Early life and family ==
Walker was born in Auckland on 19 March 1967. Her father, Ian Walker, served in the Royal Air Force and Bomber Command during World War II and was a prisoner of war.

== Rhythmic gymnastics ==
Walker began rhythmic gymnastics at age 9 after a friend who was in the sport told her about it. She qualified internationally for the 1984 Summer Olympics, but due to New Zealand Olympic Committee policies, she was not sent.

Ahead of the 1988 Summer Olympics, she went to train in Moscow with some of the best gymnasts in the world. Walker noted the intensity of training and the skill of the gymnasts she trained with, but she also said that many of those gymnasts did not enjoy rhythmic gymnastics, as she did. The experience helped her realize that she while she was unlikely to medal at the Olympics, she was content with being healthy and training by choice.

Walker was on a flight when the 1988 Olympic team was announced, and she was told by the pilots that she was the only gymnast to be selected for the Olympic team. As of 2024, she is the only New Zealander rhythmic gymnast to compete at the Olympics. In the rhythmic gymnastics individual all-around competition at the 1988 Summer Olympics in Seoul, she tied for 32nd place in the preliminary (qualification) round and did not advance to the final.

Although she originally intended to retire after the Olympics, the 1990 Commonwealth Games were being held in her hometown of Auckland, so Walker decided to continue training for another 15 months. At the Games, she won a gold and three bronze medals. Walker said later that she appreciated the approach of her coaches, as she finished her gymnastics career healthy and still enjoying gymnastics.

== Later life ==
In 1995, Walker married Kannan Subramaniam, a doctor. They have a son, Sachin. She continues to be involved in high-performance sport.

Walker has written biographies of her father, published in 2017, and Dame Yvette Williams (2022).

== Published works ==
- Walker, Angela (2017). From Battle of Britain Airman to POW Escapee: The Story of Ian Walker RAF. Pen & Sword. ISBN 9781473890725.
- Walker, Angela (2022). Ideals Like Stars: The Dame Yvette Williams Story. David Bateman. ISBN 9781776890279.
