= Tony Clarke (sport shooter) =

New Zealand sports shooter

Personal information
- Full name: Anthony James Clarke
- Born: 31 May 1959 (age 67) Auckland, New Zealand
- Height: 185 cm (6 ft 1 in)
- Weight: 74 kg (163 lb)

Sport
- Country: New Zealand
- Sport: Sports shooting
Medal record
Commonwealth Games
Gold medal – first place	1990 Auckland	10 m running target pairs
Bronze medal – third place	1994 Victoria	10 m running target pairs

Anthony James Clarke (born 31 May 1959) is a New Zealand former sports shooter. He competed in the men's 50 metre running target event at the 1984 Summer Olympics.
