= Surinder Marwah =

Indian sport shooter

Personal information
- Nationality: Indian

Sport
- Sport: Shooting
Medal record
Men's shooting
Representing India
Event	1st	2nd	3rd
Commonwealth Games	0	1	1
Asian Games	0	0	1
Commonwealth Games
Silver medal – second place	1990 Auckland	25 m centre-fire pistol
Bronze medal – third place	1990 Auckland	25 m centre-fire pistol – pairs
Asian Games
Bronze medal – third place	1994 Hiroshima	25 m centre-fire pistol team

Surinder Marwah is an Indian sport shooter who competed in pistol shooting events. He won a silver medal and a bronze medal at the 1990 Commonwealth Games, and later won a bronze medal at the 1994 Asian Games.

== Biography ==
At the 1990 Commonwealth Games in Auckland, Marwah won the silver medal in the men's 25 m centre-fire pistol event. He scored 577 points to finish behind compatriot Ashok Pandit, who won the gold medal with 583 points. Marwah teamed up with Pandit to win the bronze medal in the men's 25 m centre-fire pistol pairs event, scoring 1142 points. At the 1994 Asian Games in Hiroshima, Marwah won the bronze medal in the men's 25 m centre-fire pistol team event with Ashok Pandit and Jaspal Rana. In the individual event, he finished 17th with a score of 570 points. He also competed in the pistol events at the 1994 ISSF World Championships at Milan.
