= Om Prakash Mitharwal =

Indian sport shooter (born 1995)

Om Mitharwal
Personal information
- Full name: Om Prakash Mitharwal
- Nationality: Indian
- Born: 15 August 1995 (age 30) Sihodi, Rajasthan, India

Sport
- Country: India
- Sport: Shooting
- Event(s): 10 metre air pistol, 50 metre pistol
Medal record
Men's shooting
Representing India
World Championships
Gold medal – first place	2018 Changwon	50 m pistol
Silver medal – second place	2018 Changwon	10 m team air pistol
ISSF World Cup
Gold medal – first place	2018 Guadalajara	10 m air pistol mixed team
Commonwealth Games
Bronze medal – third place	2018 Gold Coast	10 m air pistol
Bronze medal – third place	2018 Gold Coast	50 m pistol

Om Prakash Mitharwal (born 15 August 1995) is an Indian sport shooter. At the 2018 ISSF World Shooting Championships, he won the gold medal in the 50 metre pistol and silver in 10 metre air pistol team event. He won the gold medal at the 2018 ISSF World Cup in Guadalajara in the 10 metre air pistol mixed team event with Manu Bhaker.

He won bronze in the 10 metre air pistol and 50 metre pistol events at the 2018 Commonwealth Games in Gold Coast.
