= Uwe Schröder =

German sports shooter

Personal information
- Nationality: German
- Born: 27 July 1962 (age 62); Ebstorf, Germany

Sport
- Sport: Sports shooting

Uwe Schröder (born 27 July 1962) is a German sports shooter. He competed in the men's 50 metre running target event at the 1984 Summer Olympics.
