= Larissa Lowing =

Canadian artistic gymnast

- Born: 26 January 1973 (age 53) Scarborough, Ontario, Canada

Gymnastics career
Medal record
Gymnastics
Commonwealth Games
Gold medal – first place	1990 Auckland	Team
Silver medal – second place	1990 Auckland	Beam
Silver medal – second place	1990 Auckland	Floor

Larissa Lowing-Libby (born 26 January 1973) is a Canadian artistic gymnast.

Born in the Toronto suburb of Scarborough, Ontario, Lowing competed for Canada at the 1988 Summer Olympics in Seoul. She also competed at the 1990 Commonwealth Games winning a gold medal in the team event and silver medals in the beam and floor events.
