= Adrian Gal =

Romanian gymnast

- Full name: Adrian-Francisc Gal
- Born: 6 September 1970 (age 56)

Gymnastics career
- Discipline: Men's artistic gymnastics
- Country represented: Romania
Medal record
Representing Romania
European Championships
Bronze medal – third place	1990 Lausanne	Floor exercise

Adrian-Francisc Gal (born 6 September 1970) is a Romanian gymnast. He competed in eight events at the 1992 Summer Olympics.
