= Lorna Mainwaring =

English gymnast (born 1974)

Personal information
- Nationality: English
- Born: 19 October 1974 (age 51) Wolverhampton, West Midlands

Sport
- Club: Wolverhampton
Medal record
Gymnastics
Representing England
Commonwealth Games
Bronze medal – third place	1990 Auckland	team

Lorna Anne Mainwaring (born 19 October 1974) is a female former gymnast who competed for England.

== Gymnastics career ==
Mainwaring represented England and won a bronze medal in the team event, at the 1990 Commonwealth Games in Auckland, New Zealand.
