= Raewyn Jack =

New Zealand rhythmic gymnast (born 1971

- Full name: Raewyn Katrina Jack
- Born: 21 May 1971 (age 55) Auckland, New Zealand

Gymnastics career
- Discipline: Rhythmic gymnastics
- Country represented: New Zealand
Medal record
Women's rhythmic gymnastics
Representing New Zealand
Commonwealth Games
Bronze medal – third place	1990 Auckland	Hoop
Bronze medal – third place	1990 Auckland	Ribbon

Raewyn Katrina Jack (born 21 May 1971) is a former New Zealand rhythmic gymnast. She won two bronze medals representing her country at the 1990 Commonwealth Games.

== Early life and family ==
Jack was born in Auckland on 21 May 1971, the daughter of Jocelyn and Robert Jack, and was educated at Orewa College. She went on to study at the University of Otago, graduating with Bachelor of Science and Bachelor of Physical Education degrees in 1995.

== Rhythmic gymnastics ==
Jack was a New Zealand representative in rhythmic gymnastics from 1984 to 1992, competing at three world championships, the World Student Games, and at the 1990 Commonwealth Games. At the latter event, she won bronze medals in the hoop and ribbon disciplines, placed eighth in the ball event, and was sixth in the all-around competition.

== Honours and awards ==
Jack was awarded the New Zealand 1990 Commemoration Medal. In 1991, she was named the University of Otago sportsperson of the year.
