= Andrew Austin (sport shooter) =

British sports shooter

Andy Austin
Personal information
- Nationality: English
- Born: 31 January 1956 (age 70) Sawbridgeworth, Hertfordshire, England
Medal record
Sports shooting
Representing England
Commonwealth Games
Silver medal – second place	1990 Auckland	skeet pair
Bronze medal – third place	1990 Auckland	skeet
Bronze medal – third place	1994 Victoria	skeet
Silver medal – second place	1998 Kuala Lumpur	skeet pair

Andrew Peter Austin (born 31 January 1956) is a British sport shooter.

== Sport shooting career ==
Austin competed at the 1992 Summer Olympics in the mixed skeet event, in which he tied for 21st place.

He represented England and won a silver medal in the skeet pairs with Ken Harman and a bronze medal in the individual skeet, at the 1990 Commonwealth Games in Auckland, New Zealand. Four years later he won a bronze medal in the skeet at the 1994 Commonwealth Games and at the 1998 Commonwealth Games he won his fourth medal after securing another silver in the skeet pairs with Drew Harvey.
