= Kevin Gill =

British sporting shooter (1961–2020)

Kevin John Gill
Personal information
- Born: 20 September 1961 Plymouth, Devon
- Died: 19 April 2020 (aged 58)

Sport
- Sport: Sports shooting
Medal record
Representing England
Commonwealth Games
| Gold medal – first place | 1990 Auckland | trap pairs |
| Silver medal – second place | 1990 Auckland | trap |

Kevin John Gill (20 September 1961 – 19 April 2020) was a British sports shooter. He specialised in Olympic Trap, Universal Trench and Double Trap clay pigeon shooting.

== Sports shooting career ==
Gill represented Great Britain at the 1992 Summer Olympics and the 1996 Summer Olympics.

He represented England and won a gold medal in the trap pairs with Ian Peel and a silver medal in the individual trap, at the 1990 Commonwealth Games in Auckland, New Zealand.

He was British Olympic Trap Grand Prix Champion three times. 1990, 1991 and 1996.

Gill was also World Universal Trench Champion twice. In 1986 at Vilamoura, Portugal, and 21 years later in 2007, at Tangier, Morocco.

He died on 19 April 2020.
