= Philip Scanlan =

British sports shooter

Phil Scanlan
Sport
- Sport: Sports shooting
Medal record
Representing England
Commonwealth Games
Bronze medal – third place	1990 Auckland	free rifle prone pairs
Bronze medal – third place	1990 Auckland	free rifle prone
Silver medal – second place	1998 Kuala Lumpur	free rifle prone pairs

Philip 'Phil' Scanlan is a British former sports shooter who won three Commonwealth Games medals. He was Team GB Shooting Team Leader at the 2012 Summer Olympics.

== Sports shooting career ==
Scanlan represented England and won two bronze medals in the small bore rifle prone and small bore rifle prone pairs with Bob Jarvis, at the 1990 Commonwealth Games in Auckland, New Zealand. Eight years later he won a third medal when securing a silver medal in the 50 metres free rifle prone pairs with Neil Day.
