= Chris Hector =

British sports shooter (born 1968)

Personal information
- Born: 24 December 1968 (age 57)

Sport
- Sport: Sports shooting
Medal record
Representing England
Commonwealth Games
Silver medal – second place	1990 Auckland	air rifle pairs
Silver medal – second place	1990 Auckland	air rifle
Gold medal – first place	1994 Victoria	air rifle
Silver medal – second place	1994 Victoria	air rifle pair
Bronze medal – third place	1994 Victoria	50m rifle 3 pos
Gold medal – first place	1998 Kuala Lumpur	air rifle
Gold medal – first place	1998 Kuala Lumpur	air rifle pair
Bronze medal – third place	1998 Kuala Lumpur	50m rifle 3 pos
Silver medal – second place	2002 Manchester	50m rifle 3 pos
Bronze medal – third place	2002 Manchester	air rifle pair
Gold medal – first place	2006 Melbourne	50m rifle prone
Bronze medal – third place	2006 Melbourne	50m rifle 3 pos

Christopher Hector (born 1968) is a British former sports shooter.

== Sports shooting career ==
Hector has won twelve Commonwealth Games medals spanning five Games from 1990 until 2006.

The success began when he represented England and won two silver medals in the individual air rifle and air rifle pairs with Robert Smith, at the 1990 Commonwealth Games in Auckland, New Zealand. Four years later, at his second Games in Victoria, British Columbia, he won a medal of each colour; a gold in the air rifle, a silver in the air rifle pair with Nigel Wallace and a bronze medal in the 50 metres smallbore rifle 3 position pairs with Trevor Langridge. At the 1998 Commonwealth Games in Kuala Lumpur he won three more medals; double gold in the air rifle events (the pair with Nigel Wallace) and a bronze in the rifle 3 position pairs with Kenneth Parr.

His fourth Games in 2002 in his home nation provided two medals, a silver in the rifle 3 position pair with Jason Burrage and a bronze with Nigel Wallace in the air rifle pair. A remarkable Commonwealth Games career came to an end after the 2006 Games which saw him win his 11th and 12th medals, a gold in the 50 metres prone with Michael Babb and a bronze in the rifle 3 positions with Burrage.
