= Simon Belither =

British sports shooter (born 1957)

Personal information
- Born: 1957 (age 68–69) Cambridge, Cambridgeshire

Sport
- Sport: Sports shooting
Medal record
Representing England
Commonwealth Games
Gold medal – first place	1990 Auckland	fullbore rifle pairs

Simon Belither (born 1957) is a British former sports shooter.

== Sports shooting career ==
Belither represented England and won a gold medal in the fullbore rifle pairs with Andrew Tucker, at the 1990 Commonwealth Games in Auckland, New Zealand.
