= Michael Meggison =

British sports shooter

Personal information
- Nationality: British
- Born: 31 October 1949 (age 75); Harrogate, England

Sport
- Sport: Sports shooting

Michael Meggison (born 31 October 1949) is a British sports shooter. He competed in the men's 50 metre running target event at the 1984 Summer Olympics.
