= Shooting at the Commonwealth Games =

Shooting sports have been contested at the Commonwealth Games at every games since 1966 with the exception of the 1970 and 2022 Commonwealth Games.

Events were open until they were segregated by gender in 1994 for pistol and most rifle events and in 2002 for trap and skeet events; the full bore rifle competitions remained open.

== Editions ==
Games	Year	Host city	Host country	Best nation
VIII	1966	Kingston	Jamaica	Canada
X	1974	Christchurch	New Zealand	Canada
XI	1978	Edmonton, Alberta	Canada	Canada
XII	1982	Brisbane, Queensland	Australia	Australia
XIII	1986	Edinburgh	Scotland	England
XIV	1990	Auckland	New Zealand	Australia
XV	1994	Victoria, British Columbia	Canada	Australia
XVI	1998	Kuala Lumpur	Malaysia	Australia
XVII	2002	Manchester	England	India
XVIII	2006	Melbourne, Victoria	Australia	India
XIX	2010	Delhi	India	India
XX	2014	Glasgow	Scotland	Australia
XXI	2018	Gold Coast, Queensland	Australia	India

=== 2022 Games ===
Shooting is an optional sport at the Commonwealth Games, but had been routinely included since 1974. In January 2018 it was announced that shooting would not feature in the 2022 Games programme, citing a lack of facilities near Birmingham. In December 2018, a delegation including the International Shooting Sport Federation and British Shooting visited Birmingham and discussed the addition of shooting with the Birmingham Organising Committee. In June 2019 it was reported that this proposal had been unsuccessful.

In response, India - who count Shooting as one of their most successful sports - threatened to boycott the 2022 Games in their entirety. In September 2019, Indian Olympic Association (IOA) President Narinder Batra stated that the Games "are a waste of time and money" and that India should withdraw. Batra's comments drew broad criticism from Indian athletes.

In January 2020, the IOA submitted a proposal to the Commonwealth Games Federation (CGF) to host a combined archery and shooting championships in Chandigarh during January 2022. The CGF Executive Board approved the proposal in February 2020, and also confirmed that the 2022 Commonwealth Shooting and Archery Championships and the 2022 Commonwealth Games would be two separately organised and funded Commonwealth Sport events. In July 2021, the CGF announced that the event had been cancelled due to the COVID-19 pandemic in India.

=== 2026 Games ===
In July 2022, the organising committee for the 2026 Commonwealth Games released their programme, which also did not include shooting. India expressed strong disappointment, raising the matter with organisers from Victoria during the Birmingham Games. In August 2022, Shooting Australia announced that the ISSF has submitted a proposal for shooting when the expression of interest period for additional sports opened. Like the proposals for the 2022 Games, the programme was significantly restricted and included just four disciplines - Skeet, Air Rifle, Air Pistol and Fullbore Rifle. This dropped cartridge pistol, 50m rifle, trap and double trap. "Para-Shooting" events were also promised, though it was not specified whether this was limited to airgun disciplines or included Para-Skeet, as demonstrated at the 2017 CSF(ED) Championships in Wales.

In October 2022, the inclusion of Shooting was confirmed, but without Fullbore Rifle. It was later announced that Shooting would be held in the Gippsland region, east of Melbourne. The proposal had originally been based in Greater Bendigo, north of Melbourne - to use the Wellsford Fullbore Rifle Range (which also hosted the 2006 Commonwealth Games fullbore events).

There is concern as to the continuation of meaningful CSF Championships, as test events for the Games would typically follow the Games programme - not a full programme. This has also raised concerns over funding for both the Championships and participating teams as this has traditionally been drawn from Games budgets as part of preparations.

== Events ==
Men's events

Event	66	74	78	82	86	90	94	98	02	06	10	14	18	22	26	Games
Current programs
50 metre free pistol	X	X	X	X	X	X	X	X	X	X	X	X	X			13
25 metre rapid fire pistol											X	X	X			3
10 metre air pistol				X	X	X	X	X	X	X	X	X	X		X	11
50 metre small bore rifle prone	X	X	X	X	X		X	X	X	X	X	X	X			12
50 metre small bore rifle three positions				X	X	X	X	X	X	X	X	X	X			10
10 metre air rifle				X	X	X	X	X	X	X	X	X	X		X	11
Trap											X	X	X			3
Double trap									X	X	X	X	X			5
Skeet		X	X	X	X	X	X	X	X	X	X	X	X		X	13
Past events
50 metre free pistol pairs				X	X	X	X	X	X	X	X					8
25 metre standard pistol									X	X	X					3
25 metre standard pistol pairs									X	X	X					3
25 metre centre fire pistol	X			X	X	X	X	X	X	X	X					9
25 metre centre fire pistol pairs				X	X	X	X	X	X	X	X					8
25 metre rapid fire pistol pairs				X	X	X	X	X	X	X	X					8
10 metre air pistol pairs				X	X	X	X	X	X	X	X					8
10 metre air rifle pairs				X	X	X	X	X	X	X	X					8
50 metre small bore rifle prone pairs				X	X		X	X	X	X	X					7
50 metre small bore rifle three positions pairs				X	X	X	X	X	X	X	X					8
Free rifle prone						X										1
Free rifle prone pairs						X										1
10 metre running target						X	X									2
10 metre running target pairs						X	X									2
Clay pigeon trap		X	X	X	X	X	X	X	X	X						9
Clay pigeon trap pairs									X	X						2
Trap pairs				X	X		X	X			X					5
Double trap pairs									X	X	X					3
Skeet pairs				X	X	X		X	X	X	X					7
Events	3	4	4	17	17	18	18	17	21	21	22	10	9	0	3	

Women's events

Event	66	74	78	82	86	90	94	98	02	06	10	14	18	22	26	Games
Current programs
25 metre sport pistol							X	X	X	X	X	X	X			7
10 metre air pistol							X	X	X	X	X	X	X		X	8
50 metre small bore rifle prone							X	X	X	X	X	X	X			7
50 metre small bore rifle three positions							X	X	X	X	X	X	X			7
10 metre air rifle							X	X	X	X	X	X	X		X	8
Trap											X	X	X			3
Double trap									X	X		X	X			4
Skeet									X	X		X	X		X	5
Past events
25 metre sport pistol pairs							X	X	X	X	X					5
10 metre air pistol pairs							X	X	X	X	X					5
50 metre small bore rifle prone pairs							X	X	X	X	X					5
50 metre small bore rifle three positions pairs							X	X	X	X	X					5
10 metre air rifle pairs							X	X	X	X	X					5
Clay pigeon trap									X	X						2
Clay pigeon trap pairs									X	X						2
Trap pairs											X					1
Double trap pairs									X	X						2
Skeet pairs									X	X						2
Events							10	10	16	16	12	8	8	0	3	

Open events

Event	66	74	78	82	86	90	94	98	02	06	10	14	18	22	26	Games
Current programs
Full bore Queen's prize individual				X	X	X	X	X	X	X	X	X	X			10
Full bore Queen's prize pairs	X	X	X	X	X	X	X	X	X	X	X	X	X			13
Past events
Skeet pairs							X									1
Events	1	1	1	2	2	2	3	2	2	2	2	2	2	0	0	

== All-time medal table ==
Updated after the 2018 Commonwealth Games

Rank	Nation	Gold	Silver	Bronze	Total
1	Australia	70	59	42	171
2	India	63	44	28	135
3	England	49	60	67	176
4	Canada	39	40	38	117
5	New Zealand	15	16	21	52
6	Scotland	13	16	22	51
7	Cyprus	11	5	5	21
8	Singapore	10	5	7	22
9	Wales	7	9	11	27
10	Northern Ireland	5	3	6	14
11	Malaysia	3	10	14	27
12	South Africa	2	13	9	24
13	Bangladesh	2	4	2	8
14	Isle of Man	1	2	3	6
15	Guernsey	1	2	2	5
16	Sri Lanka	1	2	0	3
17	Hong Kong	1	0	4	5
18	Jersey	1	0	1	2
19	Malta	0	1	3	4
19	Trinidad and Tobago	0	1	3	4
21	Pakistan	0	1	2	3
22	Papua New Guinea	0	1	0	1
23	Namibia	0	0	3	3
24	Jamaica	0	0	1	1
Totals (24 entries)		294	294	294	882

== Games records ==
Due to ISSF Finals format changes, all 2018 finals set Games Records by default.

Games Records to 2018
Event	Qualification	Final
10m Air Rifle Men	627.2 Deepak Kumar (IND) (2018)	245.0 Dane Sampson (AUS) (2018)
10m Air Rifle Women	423.2 Apurvi Chandela (IND) (2018)	247.2 Martina Veloso (SGP) (2018)
50m Rifle Prone Men	624.5 Warren Potent (AUS) (2014)	248.8 David Phelps (WAL) (2018)
50m Rifle Prone Women	621.0 Martina Veloso (SGP) (2018)	N/A
50m Rifle Three Position Men	1180 Sanjeev Rajput (IND) (2018)	454.4 Sanjeev Rajput (IND) (2018)
50m Rifle Three Position Women	589 Anjum Moudgil (IND) (2018)	457.9 Tejaswini Sawant (IND) (2018)
Queens Prize Individual	404-49v David Luckman (ENG) (2018)	N/A
Queens Prize Pairs	595-77v David Luckman (ENG) (2014); Parag Patel (ENG) (2014)	N/A
10m Air Pistol Men		235.1 Jitu Rai (IND) (2018)
10m Air Pistol Women	388 Manu Bhaker (IND) (2018)	240.9 Manu Bhaker (IND) (2018)
25m Rapid Fire Pistol Men		30 Anish Bhanwala (IND) (2018)
25m Pistol Women		38 Heena Sidhu (IND) (2018)
50m Pistol Men		227.2 Daniel Repacholi (AUS) (2018)
Skeet Men		123 Georgios Achilleos (CYP) (2018)
Skeet Women		52 Andri Eleftheriou (CYP) (2018)
Trap Men		46 Michael Wixey (WAL) (2018)
Trap Women		38 Laetisha Scanlan (AUS) (2018)
Double Trap Men		74 David McMath (SCO) (2018)
Double Trap Women		N/A
