= Ken Harman =

British sports shooter (born 1947)

Personal information
- Born: 21 December 1947 (age 78)

Sport
- Sport: Sports shooting
Medal record
Representing England
Commonwealth Games
Gold medal – first place	1986 Edinburgh	skeet pairs
Gold medal – first place	1990 Auckland	skeet
Silver medal – second place	1990 Auckland	skeet pairs

Kenneth Harman (born 1947) is a British former sports shooter.

== Sports shooting career ==
Harman competed in the 1988 Summer Olympics.

He represented England and won a gold medal in the skeet pairs with Joe Neville, at the 1986 Commonwealth Games in Edinburgh, Scotland. Four years later he represented England and won another gold medal in the individual skeet and a silver medal in the skeet pairs with Andy Austin, at the 1990 Commonwealth Games in Auckland, New Zealand. A third appearance arrived at the 1994 Commonwealth Games when he competed in the skeet and skeet pairs with Andy Austin.
