= Lisa Elliott =

British artistic gymnast

Personal information
- Nationality: English

Sport
- Club: Egham
Medal record
Gymnastics
Representing England
Commonwealth Games
Bronze medal – third place	1990 Auckland	team

Lisa Elliott is a female former gymnast who competed for England.

== Gymnastics career ==
Elliott represented England and won a bronze medal in the team event, at the 1990 Commonwealth Games in Auckland, New Zealand.
