= Andrew Tucker (sport shooter) =

British sports shooter and gunsmith

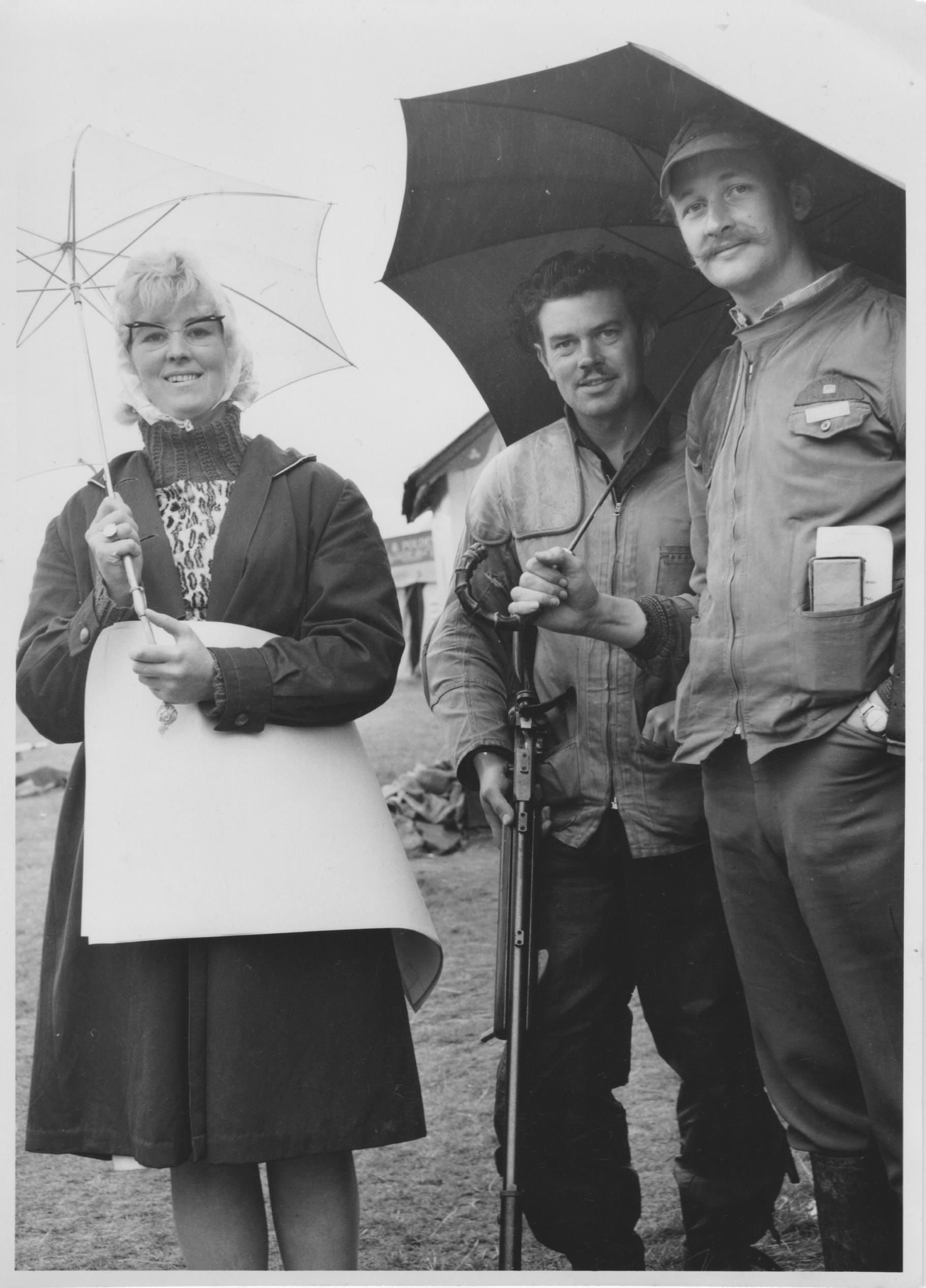
- Andrew Tucker (right) with fellow shooters Brenda & Colin Almond (left & centre)

Personal information
- Full name: Andrew St George Tucker
- Born: 17 July 1937 Edinburgh, Scotland
- Died: 9 July 2003 (aged 65)

Sport
- Country: England
- Sport: Sports shooting
Medal record
Representing England
Commonwealth Games
| Gold medal – first place | 1990 Auckland | fullbore rifle pairs |
| Silver medal – second place | 1990 Auckland | fullbore rifle |

Andrew St George Tucker (1937–2003) was a Scottish-born sports shooter who represented England and Great Britain shooting smallbore and fullbore target rifle. He won the Queen's Prize at Bisley twice, medalled at the 1990 Commonwealth Games in Auckland as well as winning the NSRA Lord Roberts Trophy for smallbore, He also won the Grand Aggregates at both the NRA Imperial Meeting and NSRA National Smallbore Meeting. He is the first and (as of 2023) only person to win the "big four" of both British titles and both Grand Aggregates. He ran Andrew Tucker Gunsmiths, manufacturing firearms and target shooting equipment including jackets, rifle slings and gloves.

== Sports shooting career ==
Tucker began his shooting career in the cadet force shooting team at Felsted School, winning the Iveagh match at Bisley in 1954. In 1964 he won the Grand Aggregate at the NSRA National Smallbore Rifle Meeting, and in the 1970s represented Great Britain at World Cups, partnering Malcolm Cooper.

In 1974 he gained his first England full-bore rifle cap.

In 1975 he won the Earl Roberts Cup (the British smallbore championship) after a tie shoot against Alister Allan.

He travelled extensively to matches both with the GB Fullbore Rifle Team and independently. In 1976 he won the silver medal in the Grand Aggregate of the Dominion of Canada Rifle Association's meeting on the Connaught Ranges in Ottawa.

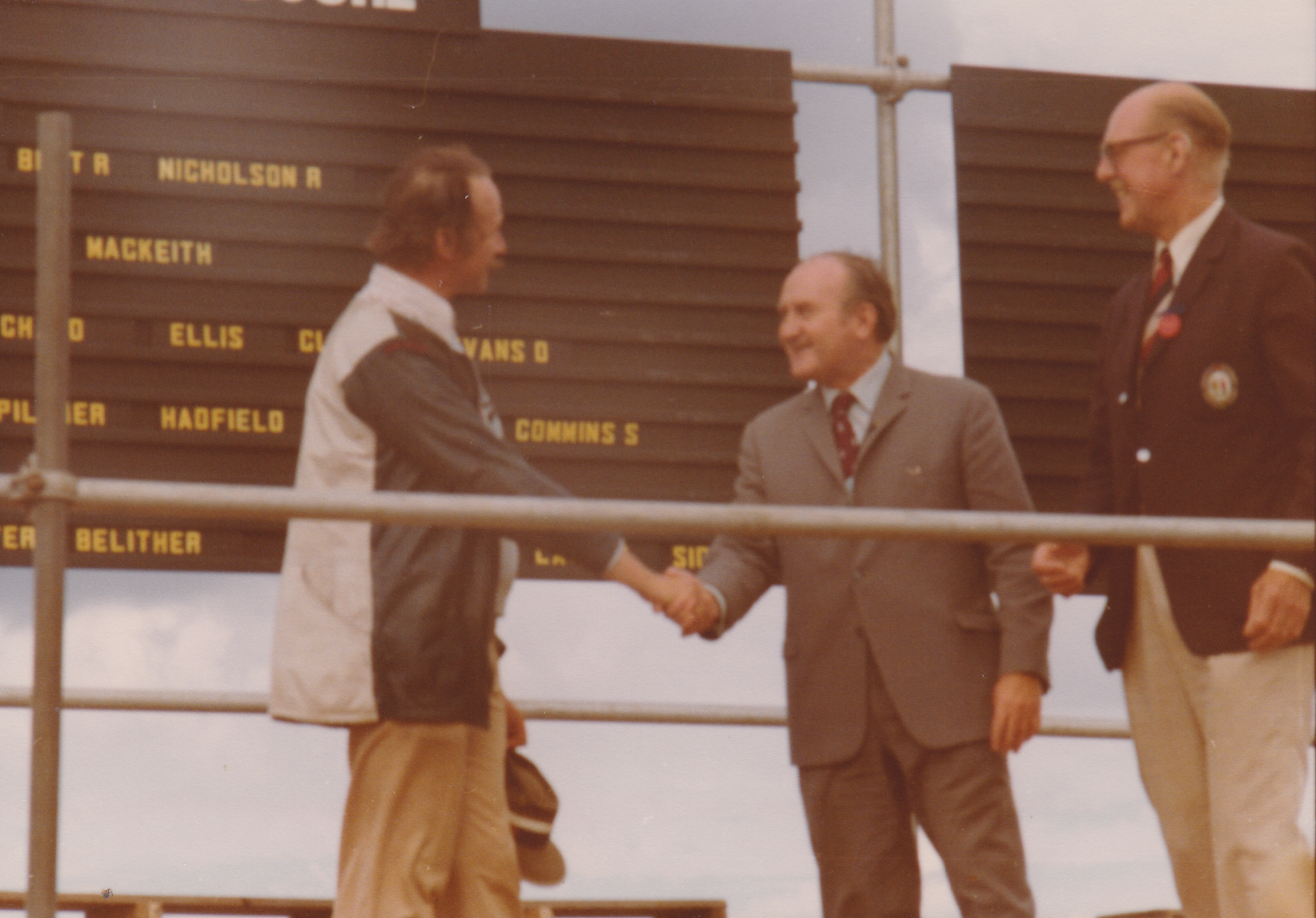
Andrew Tucker in front of the scoreboard after winning the Queen's Prize in 1979, wearing one of his eponymous shooting jackets

In 1979 Tucker won the Queen's Prize for the first time. He won the Grand Aggregate at the 1986 Imperial Meeting, and the Queen's Prize again in 1987.

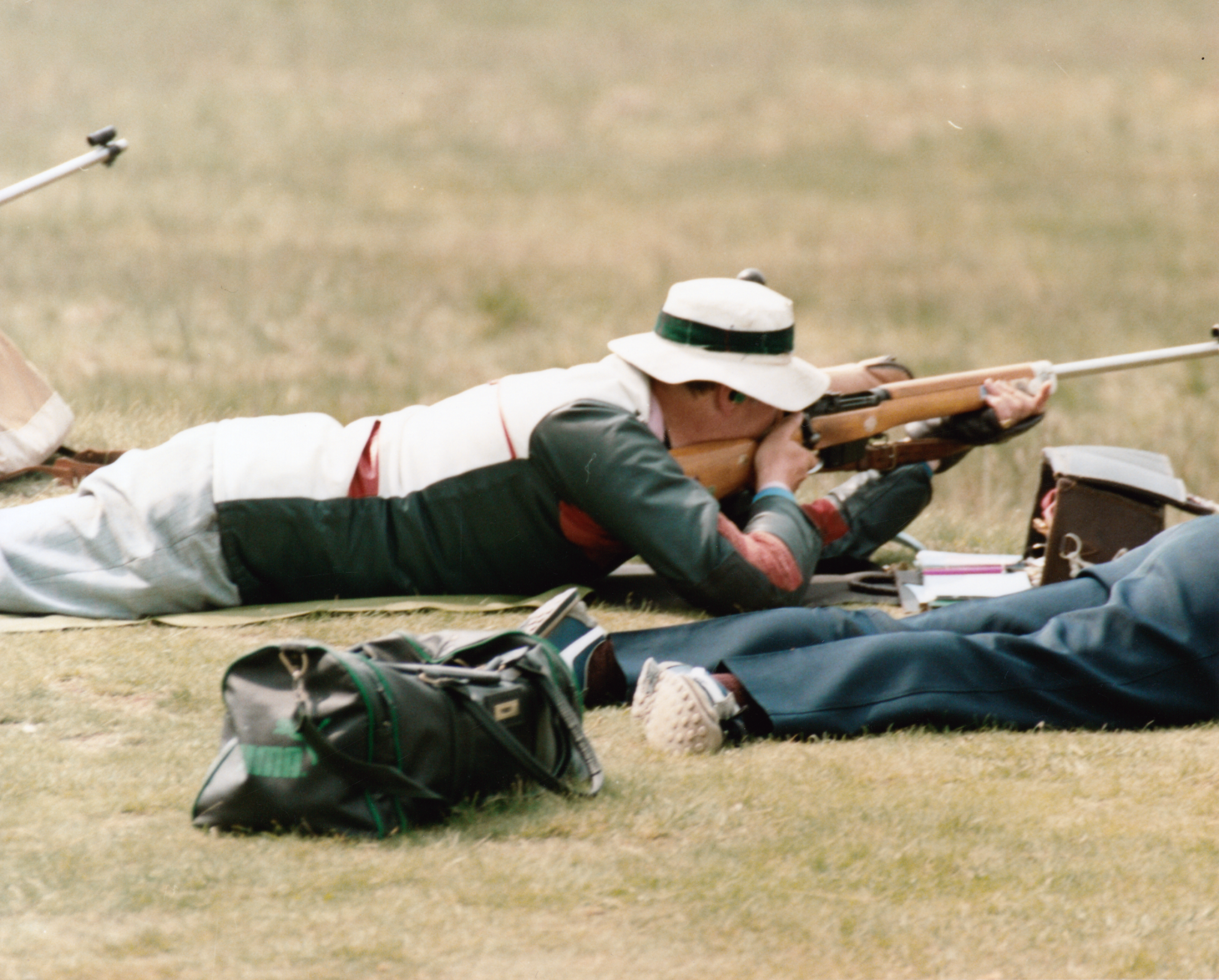
Andrew Tucker firing a fullbore target rifle

Tucker represented England and won a gold medal in the fullbore rifle pairs with Simon Belither and a silver medal in the individual fullbore rifle, at the 1990 Commonwealth Games in Auckland, New Zealand.

In 1995, he captained the England touring team to Canada, where they beat the Canadians on their home range.

== Personal life ==
Andrew St George Tucker was born in 1937 in Edinburgh. Although born in Scotland, his parents were English and he chose to represent England in competition. He attended Felsted School in Essex, where he joined the shooting team of the CCF.

During National Service, he was posted to armourer duties on account of his shooting abilities. In 1958 he left the RAF and joined the prestigious gunmaking firm of Cogswell & Harrison of Piccadilly, where he met his future wife - the sister of a colleague.

In 1964, Tucker married Kathy and they moved to Cobham, Surrey, founding Andrew Tucker Gunsmiths - manufacturing sporting firearms as well as shooting jackets, slings and gloves. "Tucker jackets" became a common piece of equipment amongst British target shooters for the next 30 years.

Tucker died aged 65 on 9 July 2003 following a five year battle with cancer.
