= Matthew Vine =

British weightlifter

Personal information
- Nationality: English
- Born: 7 September 1959 (age 65); Maidstone, Kent

Sport
- Club: Riverside Gym Maidstone

Matthew Vine (born 1959), is a male former weightlifter who competed for Great Britain and England.

== Weightlifting career ==
Vine represented Great Britain in the 1988 Summer Olympics.

He represented England in the +110 kg super-heavyweight division, at the 1990 Commonwealth Games in Auckland, New Zealand.
