= John Maddison (sport shooter) =

British sports shooter

Sport
- Sport: Sports shooting
Medal record
Representing England
Commonwealth Games
Silver medal – second place	1990 Auckland	running target

John Maddison is a British former sports shooter.

== Sports shooting career ==
Maddison represented England and won a silver medal in the running target, at the 1990 Commonwealth Games in Auckland, New Zealand.
