= Robert Smith (sport shooter) =

British sports shooter

Sport
- Sport: Sports shooting
Medal record
Representing England
Commonwealth Games
| Bronze medal – third place | 1986 Edinburgh | 10m air rifle pairs |
| Silver medal – second place | 1990 Auckland | 10m air rifle pairs |
| Silver medal – second place | 1990 Auckland | 50m 3 pos rifle pairs |

Robert Smith is a British former sports shooter.

== Sports shooting career ==
Smith represented England and won a bronze medal in the 10 metres air rifle pairs with Malcolm Cooper, at the 1986 Commonwealth Games in Edinburgh, Scotland. Four years later he represented England again and won two more medals; both silver, in the 10 metres air rifle pairs with Chris Hector and in the 50 metres small bore rifle three positions pairs, with Malcolm Cooper, at the 1990 Commonwealth Games in Auckland, New Zealand
