= Neil Thomas (gymnast) =

English gymnast

- Born: 6 April 1968 (age 58) Chirk, Wrexham, Wales
- Height: 162 cm (5 ft 4 in)

Gymnastics career
- Discipline: Men's artistic gymnastics
- Country represented: (United Kingdom) Great Britain; England
- Club: Liverpool Gymnastics Club
Medal record
Artistic gymnastics
Representing Great Britain
World Championships
| Silver medal – second place | 1993 Birmingham | Floor |
| Silver medal – second place | 1994 Brisbane | Floor |
European Championships
| Bronze medal – third place | 1990 Lausanne | Vault |
Representing England
Commonwealth Games
| Gold medal – first place | 1990 Auckland | Floor |
| Silver medal – second place | 1990 Auckland | Team |
| Gold medal – first place | 1994 Victoria | All-Around |
| Gold medal – first place | 1994 Victoria | Floor |
| Bronze medal – third place | 1994 Victoria | Vault |

Neil Roderick Thomas MBE (born 6 April 1968) is a retired English artistic gymnast who experienced most of his success in the floor exercise. An acknowledged inspiration to the golden generation of British gymnasts from 2004 onwards, and a pathfinder for his national programme, he is a world silver medalist and Commonwealth Games Champion and one of the most successful British gymnasts in the history of the sport.

== Gymnastics career ==
Born in Chirk, Wrexham in Wales on 6 April 1968, Thomas was noteworthy as a successful gymnast at world and international level at a time when British gymnastics generally did not figure at that level, and is regarded as an important torchbearer in the sport for the later successes of Beth Tweddle and Louis Smith which in turn ignited, and helped secure funding for, the revolution in British gymnastics in the 2010s that saw Great Britain become a leading nation in the sport.

Winner of three gold medals spanning two Commonwealth Games, Thomas also added a world silver medal on the floor in 1993, and repeated the feat in 1994. he finished 20th at the Barcelona Olympics in 1992. Representing England he won a Commonwealth gold medal on the floor and a silver in the team competition in Auckland, New Zealand.

He also won the vault bronze medal at the 1990 European Championships. In 1993, he won Great Britain's first World Championship medal in Artistic Gymnastics (silver) 1993. A year later he won a gold medal on floor and became All-around champion at the 1994 Commonwealth Games, and also won the silver medal on floor at World Championships in Brisbane.

== Post-retirement and personal life ==
He was awarded the Member of the Order of the British Empire (MBE) in the 1995 New Year Honours for services to gymnastics and in recognition of his near single-handed achievement in putting British men's gymnastics on the map.

Following retirement, Thomas works as a development officer in the north west of England. He is a member of the Liverpool Gymnastics Club. He is cousin to TV journalist Owen Spencer-Thomas, who was also awarded the MBE.
