= Erland Johansson =

Swedish sports shooter (born 1960)

Personal information
- Nationality: Swedish
- Born: 29 August 1960 (age 65) Ängelholm, Sweden

Sport
- Sport: Sports shooting

Erland Johansson (born 29 August 1960) is a Swedish sports shooter. He competed in the men's 50 metre running target event at the 1984 Summer Olympics.
