= Shooting at the 2018 Commonwealth Games – Men's 50 metre pistol =

Shooting – Men's 50 metre pistol at the 2018 Commonwealth Games
- Venue: Belmont Shooting Centre, Brisbane
- Dates: 11 April 2018
- Competitors: 21 from 12 nations

Medalists
gold medal	Daniel Repacholi	Australia
silver medal	Shakil Ahmed	Bangladesh
bronze medal	Om Mitharval	India

The Men's 50 metre pistol event took place on 11 April 2018 at the Belmont Shooting Centre. Daniel Repacholi won the gold medal with a Games Record score. Shakil Ahmed won the silver medal and Om Mitharval won the bronze.

== Results ==
=== Preliminaries ===
Rank	Name	Country	1	2	ex 200	3	ex 300	4	ex 400	5	ex 500	6	Final	Notes
1	Om Mitharval	India	89	90	179	92	271	95	366	89	455	94	549- 6x	Q
2	Bin Gai	Singapore	93	86	179	95	274	94	368	90	458	88	546- 8x	Q
3	Daniel Repacholi	Australia	87	92	179	89	268	92	360	93	453	93	546- 7x	Q
4	Shakil Ahmed	Bangladesh	88	92	180	91	271	93	364	94	458	87	545- 10x	Q
5	Johnathan Wong	Malaysia	92	96	188	95	283	91	374	83	457	88	545- 6x	Q
6	Jitu Rai	India	93	91	184	87	271	89	360	93	453	89	542- 8x	Q
7	Kristian Callaghan	England	89	89	178	89	267	92	359	88	447	94	541- 5x	Q
8	Swee Hon Lim	Singapore	92	87	179	85	264	95	359	85	444	90	534- 5x	Q
9	Roger Daniel	Trinidad and Tobago	87	85	172	94	266	86	352	84	436	93	529- 5x	
10	Md Anowar Hossain	Bangladesh	87	83	170	90	260	91	351	87	438	90	528- 7x	
11	Bruce Quick	Australia	88	86	174	88	262	91	353	85	438	87	525- 6x	
12	Rhodney Allen	Trinidad and Tobago	89	83	172	82	254	87	341	85	426	92	518- 2x	
13	Jonathan Patron	Gibraltar	87	87	174	82	256	87	343	83	426	91	517- 5x	
14	Yue Zhao	New Zealand	89	82	171	82	253	82	335	92	427	84	511- 3x	
15	Daniel Payas	Gibraltar	88	86	174	85	259	85	344	81	425	85	510- 4x	
16	Thanthulage Fernando	Sri Lanka	85	87	172	78	250	85	335	87	422	87	509- 1x	
17	Douglas Creek	Norfolk Island	82	84	166	86	252	85	337	87	424	84	508- 5x	
18	Upul Wijerathna	Sri Lanka	78	90	168	87	255	85	340	83	423	85	508- 1x	
19	Ronald Sargeant	Barbados	73	77	150	83	233	85	318	81	399	82	481- 5x	
20	Bernard Chase	Barbados	82	66	148	76	224	82	306	80	386	84	470- 1x	
21	Stephen Ryan	Norfolk Island	76	53	129	72	201	57	258	67	325	68	393- 1x	

=== Final ===
The full final results were:

Rank	Name	Country	1	2	1-2	3	1-3	4	1-4	5	1-5	6	1-6	7	1-7	8	1-8	9	1-9	Final	Notes
1st place, gold medalist(s)	Daniel Repacholi	Australia	47.9	43.3	91.2	18.7	109.9	20.1	130.0	19.9	149.9	18.6	168.5	19.9	188.4	20.3	208.7	18.5	227.2	227.2	GR
2nd place, silver medalist(s)	Shakil Ahmed	Bangladesh	45.9	45.5	91.4	19.7	111.1	18.8	129.9	16.8	146.7	19.1	165.8	17.8	183.6	18.6	202.2	18.3	220.5	220.5	
3rd place, bronze medalist(s)	Om Mitharval	India	45.2	48.5	93.7	17.6	111.3	18.6	129.9	18.4	148.3	20.2	168.5	17.8	186.3	14.8	201.1	-	-	201.1	
4	Kristian Callaghan	England	48.9	44.1	93.0	16.2	109.2	18.6	127.8	15.9	143.7	19.0	162.7	18.7	181.4	-	-	-	-	181.4	
5	Swee Hon Lim	Singapore	47.0	46.1	93.1	19.5	112.6	17.3	129.9	17.1	147.0	15.5	162.5	-	-	-	-	-	-	162.5	
6	Bin Gai	Singapore	44.5	45.5	90.0	19.8	109.8	17.5	127.3	15.8	143.1	-	-	-	-	-	-	-	-	143.1	
7	Johnathan Wong	Malaysia	48.0	40.6	88.6	17.3	105.9	20.1	126.0	−	-	-	-	-	-	-	-	-	-	126.0	
8	Jitu Rai	India	43.6	42.3	85.9	19.1	105.0	-	-	-	-	-	-	-	-	-	-	-	-	105.0	
