= Bob Jarvis (sport shooter) =

British sports shooter

Sport
- Sport: Sports shooting
Medal record
Representing England
Commonwealth Games
Bronze medal – third place	1990 Auckland	smallbore rifle pairs

Robert 'Bob' Jarvis is a British former sports shooter.

== Sports shooting career ==
Jarvis represented England and won a bronze medal in the small bore rifle, prone pairs with Philip Scanlan, at the 1990 Commonwealth Games in Auckland, New Zealand.
