= Sarah Northey =

British synchronised swimmer

Medal record

Women's swimming

Representing England

Commonwealth Games
Silver medal – second place	1990 Auckland	Synchronised Swimming - Duet

Sarah Northey was a silver medalist in the women's synchronised swimming event at the 1990 Commonwealth Games. Born in Taunton, Somerset, she later moved to Reading. Sarah is the youngest of three daughters by Colin and Jacqueline Northey.
