= John Maxwell (sport shooter) =

Australian sport shooter

Personal information
- Nationality: Australian
- Born: 13 October 1951 (age 74) Temora, New South Wales

Sport
- Sport: Shooting sport
- Club: Cecil Park Clay Target Club
Medal record
Sport shooting
Representing Australia
Commonwealth Games
Gold medal – first place	1990 Auckland	Men's Trap
Bronze medal – third place	1990 Auckland	Men's Trap - Pairs

John Maxwell (born 13 October 1951 in Temora, New South Wales) is an Australian sport shooter and coach. He competed at the Summer Olympics in 1988 and 1996; in 1988, he tied for 22nd place in the mixed trap event, while in 1996, he placed fourth in the men's trap event.
