= James May (gymnast) =

British gymnast (born 1968)

- Full name: James Michael May
- Born: 30 January 1968 (age 58) Seaton, Devon, England

Gymnastics career
- Discipline: Men's artistic gymnastics
- Country represented: (United Kingdom) Great Britain; England
- Club: Bristol Hawks Gymnastics Club
Medal record
Men's artistic gymnastics
Representing England
Commonwealth Games
Gold medal – first place	1990 Auckland	Vault
Silver medal – second place	1990 Auckland	Team
Silver medal – second place	1990 Auckland	Rings
Bronze medal – third place	1990 Auckland	All-around
Bronze medal – third place	1990 Auckland	Pommel horse

James Michael May (born 30 January 1968) is a male retired British gymnast. May competed at the 1992 Summer Olympics where he finished 33rd in the individual all around and 12th with Great Britain in the team final. He won five medals at the 1990 Commonwealth Games in Auckland, New Zealand, when representing England. He won a gold medal in the vault, two silver medals in the team event and rings, and two bronze medals in the all-around and pommel horse.
