= Concerns and controversies at the 2022 Commonwealth Games =

There have been concerns and controversies about the 2022 Commonwealth Games, which were held in Birmingham, England.

== Selection of venues ==
=== Athletics ===
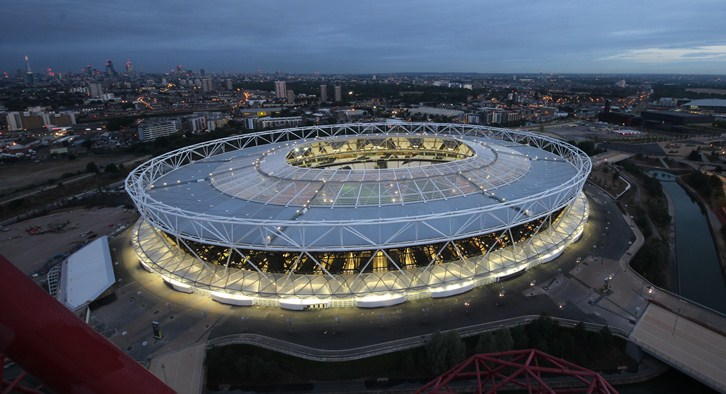
London Stadium was rejected by the Birmingham bid committee and city council to host the athletics.

In June 2017, during the preparation of the Birmingham bid for the 2022 Commonwealth Games, the Birmingham bid committee proposed to renovate Alexander Stadium and use it for hosting the athletics events and ceremonies of the Games. But in August 2017, Ed Warner, a senior UK Athletics (UKA) official proposed the London Stadium in London to host the athletic events while Birmingham and West Midlands to host the rest of the sporting events of the Games. The London Stadium hosted the athletics and the opening and closing ceremonies of the 2012 Summer Olympics and Paralympics as well as the 2017 World Athletic Championships and Para Athletics Championships.If this proposal were accepted, two sports would be held in the British capital, as track cycling events would be held in the city.

On 11 April 2018, British Prime Minister Theresa May visited the Alexander Stadium and announced that the stadium would be renovated for the Games at a cost of £70 million. She said that the investment would benefit the local community and the West Midlands region.

In February 2019, an official from Birmingham City Council claimed that the refurbished Alexander Stadium would become a white elephant after the Games as no long-term tenant for the stadium was identified. They were also concerned about the funding arrangement of the Games and claimed that spending funds in organizing the Games could put the council into very heavy debt.

On 21 June 2019, Birmingham City Council released the images and plans for renovating Alexander Stadium and claimed that it would create a legacy asset for the Perry Barr area in which it stands. The council claimed that the stadium could become the permanent home for the UKA and host major athletics events such as the annual Diamond League stage along the London Stadium.

On 30 January 2020, Birmingham City Council's planning committee approved the renovation plans for Alexander Stadium which would cost £72 million. The revamped stadium would also host a range of tenants including Birchfield Harriers Athletics Club and Birmingham City University, and in addition, a large part of the stands would be temporary to reduce costs.

=== Track cycling ===
The organising committee of the Games confirmed on July 19, 2017, that the track cycling events would be held at the Lee Valley VeloPark in London as a way to save money and also as a celebration of 10 years since the 2012 Summer Olympics. They cited the option to held the events outside the host city as "the West Midlands did not have a suitable facility to host track cycling". The Birmingham bid committee had investigated the possibility of using the Derby Arena in Derby or converting Arena Birmingham into a temporary velodrome, but instead they chose to use the Lee Valley VeloPark velodrome in London. The Lee Valley VeloPark is situated on Queen Elizabeth Olympic Park in Stratford, East London, and previously hosted the track cycling of the 2012 Olympics and Paralympics as well as the 2016 UCI Track Cycling World Championships.

The people of Birmingham and the West Midlands were unhappy with the bid committee's decision as they would have to travel to London to watch the events. In January 2018, a petition was launched by a citizen of Birmingham on Change.org, calling for a velodrome to be constructed in the West Midlands for use at the 2022 Commonwealth Games in Birmingham. It claimed that the construction of a venue would help to develop the sport in the West Midlands region, which has a population of 5.6 million people but no indoor velodrome. It also said that velodromes could be used as a multi-sport facility by hosting basketball, netball, table tennis and boxing, as well as staging non-sporting events, such as music concerts. Over 5,000 people had signed the petition within four months from the date of the bid committee's decision.

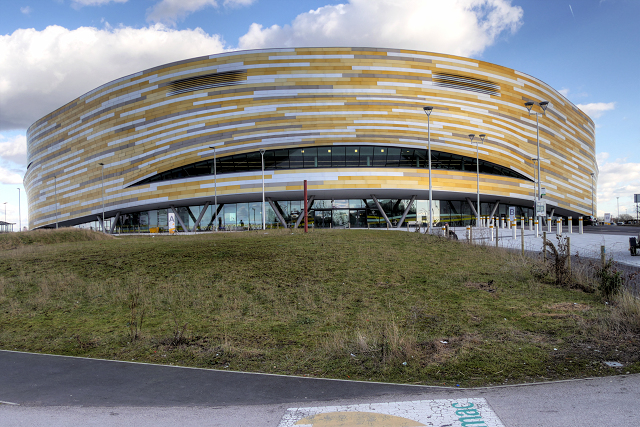
Derby Arena was rejected by the Birmingham organising committee to host track cycling.

In September 2018, an official from Birmingham City Council defended the committee's decision to select the velodrome in London rather than constructing a new velodrome in the West Midlands and also claimed that the decision was reached in consultation with British Cycling and Sport England. They said that constructing a new velodrome would cost £50 million which could have disturbed the Games' as well as the council's budget. Further they added that the bid committee had asked the Origin Sports Group to carry out feasibility work to assess the viability of installing a temporary track to ensure track cycling would be part of the Games. They also continued to explore both temporary options in the city as well as looking at venues within the region, such as Derby Arena. To meet the CGF's venue requirements for hosting track cycling, the seating capacity must be at least 4,000 which ruled out the temporary options that were being explored in the city, as well as Derby Arena. The only suitable velodromes in the country are Lee Valley VeloPark velodrome London, which has 6,500 seats, and Manchester Velodrome, which was used during the 2002 Commonwealth Games, which could install sufficient temporary seating to meet the 4,000 minimum capacity. The organising committee finally agreed with the Lee Valley VeloPark in London to host the games' track cycling events. They also added that the construction of a £50 million velodrome would have made staging the Games, as a whole, an unviable proposition, which he meant that the city and region would have missed out the legacy benefits of new housing, better transport and a repositioned international profile.

In March 2020, British Cycling issued a "Cycling Facility Assessment" which stated that building a new velodrome in Birmingham was not considered a “high priority” and did not have an adequately stable strategic or business case to support such an investment.

== Budget crisis ==
In September 2018, it was speculated that the games could bankrupt Birmingham City Council. An audit report revealed that the council had an £84 million debt at that time when vast sums of its emergency reserves were spent. The audit report also stated that the city had spent £116 million in emergency reserves in the previous two years just to run the council and that £52 million in savings were needed for the next complete year. The report also revealed that the council's emergency savings at one point dropped to £72 million.

It was decided between the British Government and the council that the government would pay the 75% of the total £750 million cost of hosting the games while the rest 25% would be covered by the city council which is nearly £180 million. While the council was ready to cover the Games' 25% cost, some members of the council believed that covering such cost could put the council into very heavy debt. Some feared that Birmingham, being Europe's largest local authority with an annual budget of £3 billion, could face insolvency in the next few years if its finances were not improved. One of the officials of the Birmingham City Council said that the council's financial position as “very poor” and said the situation was not helped by hosting the upcoming Commonwealth Games. Council leader Ian Ward denied that the Games would bankrupt the authority.

In order to avoid to bankruptcy, Birmingham City Council proposed to impose a 'hotel tax', to help pay 25% cost for the Commonwealth Games. A hotel tax could mean charging hotel visitors in Birmingham £1 per night, potentially raising £15 million over three years to help fund the Games.

In September 2023, one year after the Games, Birmingham City Council issued a Section 114 notice declaring that it did not have the resources to balance its budget. Although the council blamed its financial problems on the cost of settling equal pay claims, an ex-adviser to the council said that hosting the Games had been "a challenge too far" that had left the city in a difficult financial position.

== Athletes' village ==
=== Cost ===
During the Birmingham City Council cabinet meeting of 11 February 2020, the council's draft financial plan showed that the Athletes' Village in Perry Barr would not be built within its estimated £492.6 million cost. The financial plan also explained that the cost pressure was due to the "constrained timescales" to build the village and hence its expected cost might increase. The Athletes' Village was expected to house over 6,500 athletes and officials during the Games, before being converted into 1,400 homes for the community as part of a long-term regeneration plan for Perry Barr known as the Perry Barr Regeneration Scheme.

On 10 March 2020, it was reported that the cost of the Athletes Village would rise to £91.8 million due to its construction cost price inflation and increased demand for building workers, as said by the Birmingham City Council. Due to cost pressures, the bed space requirement of the village was reduced from 6,500 to 6,320. The city council also announced it would aim to lower the additional £91.8 million costs by £25 million.

=== Replacement ===
The BOCCG announced on 11 August 2020 that the athletes' village which was due to be accommodated in the new Perry Barr housing development, had been abandoned. The decision was made due to the ongoing COVID-19 pandemic and associated lockdown, which had interrupted construction work. Athletes and team officials would instead be housed in three villages, two students' residences at the University of Birmingham and University of Warwick, and another one inside the hotels inside the NEC Complex. The hotels' use was the same option chosen for the track cyclists who stayed inside the London Olympic Park.

The athletes' village was originally planned on the site of the former Birmingham City University campus as part of the Perry Barr regeneration scheme, which as of September 2020 was under construction and was planned to be completed by 2022. The Australian firm Lendlease is constructing the campus at a cost of £350 million The Athletes Village was planned to be home to over 6,500 athletes and officials, and to be converted into 1,400 homes for the community following the Games. It was also the largest infrastructure project directly related to the Games. The campus was designed by the British firms Glancy Nicholls Architects and Glenn Howells Architects.

== Sporting programme ==
=== Shooting ===
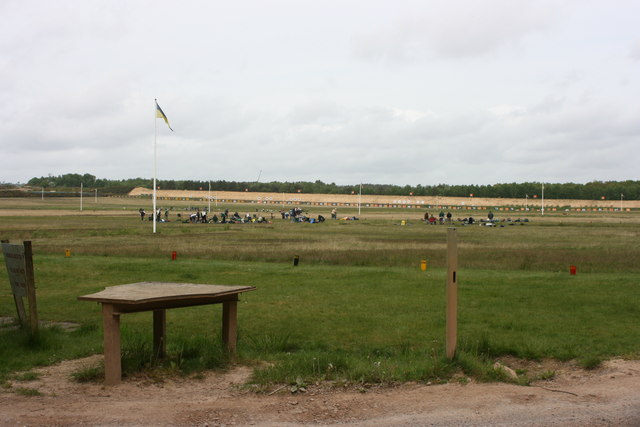
National Shooting Centre in Bisley, Surrey was rejected by the Birmingham organising committee to host shooting.

In January 2018, the CGF confirmed that shooting, which is an optional sport according to the CGF constitution, would not feature at the 2022 Commonwealth Games as the organising committee of the Games decided to exclude the sport. This sparked anger amongst the athletes from India and the Indian Olympic Association (IOA) as India performed well in shooting during the previous edition of the Games at Gold Coast in 2018 by winning 16 medals, including 7 golds. Officials from the National Rifle Association of India and IOA were unhappy with the decision of removal of shooting and wanted the Indian government to boycott the 2022 Commonwealth Games. Meanwhile, the IOA requested the CGF and the organising Committee of the 2022 Commonwealth Games to include Shooting in the event. On 20 June 2019, during the CGF board meeting in Birmingham, the CGF confirmed that the Shooting sport has been excluded from the 2022 Commonwealth Games as no suitable venue has been found in the host city Birmingham and in the West Midlands region. Later officials from the IOA discussed with the Indian government officials about boycotting the 2022 Games as the organising committee did not add shooting in the Games.

On 30 July 2019, an official from the Birmingham 2022 said that shooting was not included in Birmingham's bid and that in September 2018, five sports that were not included in the original bid – shooting, archery, beach volleyball, para table tennis and cricket – expressed their desire to be part of the Games. He also stated that the Birmingham 2022 Board was committed to conducting a review, offering each sport a chance to be included and the process they conducted was fair, logical and transparent and the assessment panel included senior representatives from key Games Partners including Birmingham 2022, Department for Digital, Culture, Media & Sport; Commonwealth Games England and Birmingham City Council. Shooting scored highly on some of the key criteria and the Panel recognised the submission from the International Shooting Sport Federation (ISSF), the International Confederation of Fullbore Rifle Associations (ICFRA) and British Shooting (BS). But the Panel determined that the proposed location for shooting at National Shooting Centre in Bisley, Surrey which is 130 miles away from Birmingham, offered very little benefit to the West Midlands, in a Games with a significant proportion of funding coming from the region. Bisley had been used when Manchester staged the Games in 2002. The Panel did offer the opportunity for the sport to submit an alternative Birmingham based proposal – most likely two disciplines in one Birmingham venue – but the ISSF, ICFRA and BS were not ready to submit a proposal that did not include all four disciplines in a single Bisley-based venue. As a result of that review, Birmingham 2022 proposed adding three sports – women's cricket, para table tennis and beach volleyball – all of which could be staged in venues in Birmingham or the West Midlands and could bring additional benefits to the region.

On 14 November 2019, officials from the CGF and IOA had a meeting in Delhi to discuss the exclusion of shooting and to find a solution. Afterwards, the CGF revealed that their team would attend the ISSF Extraordinary General Assembly in Munich, Germany in December 2019 to discuss how the sport can be involved in the 2022 Games. The IOA revealed they would wait for the meeting between the CGF and the ISSF before taking any decision on whether to boycott the 2022 Games in Birmingham. Later, the NRAI expressed its commitment to hosting a shooting competition in India before Birmingham 2022 and endorsed the idea of the IOA to allow medals won there to count towards the overall 2022 Commonwealth Games table even though as with the Olympics, a medals table is discouraged in the Commonwealth Games. On 30 December 2019, the IOA announced in its Annual General Meeting in Delhi that they will participate in the 2022 Commonwealth Games in Birmingham and will also bid for the 2026 or 2030 Commonwealth Games.

In January 2020, it was proposed that shooting and archery competitions would take place in India some time before the Birmingham Games but count in the medal table. The ISSF and the World Archery supported the decision. It was announced that CGF would review the decision of inclusion of shooting and archery with the Games partners by January or February 2020.

On 4 February 2020, the House of Lords endorsed India's proposal to host the additional shooting and archery events for the 2022 Commonwealth Games. On 24 February 2020, the CGF announced that they had accepted India's proposal of hosting the archery and shooting events in India for the 2022 Commonwealth Games, but the two sports will be conducted as a separate event called as the Commonwealth Archery and Shooting Championships, which will be hosted in Chandigarh in January 2022. The CGF also confirmed that the medals won in the championships will be counted in the final medal table of the 2022 Commonwealth Games. As a result of the COVID-19 pandemic, the Commonwealth Archery and Shooting Championships 2022 were subsequently cancelled.

== Effects of the COVID-19 pandemic ==
=== Preparations delay ===
The Birmingham City Council had found that the preparations of the Games could be affected due to the COVID-19 pandemic. The council revealed that the Games preparations, which include the construction of the Athletes' Village and the demolition of the Perry Barr flyover, could possibly face unexpected delays, due to a 20 per cent reduction in the workforce.

=== Schedule clash ===
The 2020 Summer Olympics and Paralympics, due to be held from 24 July to 9 August and 25 August to 6 September respectively in 2020 in Tokyo, Japan, were postponed by one year due to the COVID-19 pandemic. The new dates were confirmed on 30 March 2020 by the International Olympic Committee (IOC), Tokyo Organising Committee of the Olympic and Paralympic Games, Tokyo Metropolitan Government and the International Paralympic Committee (IPC). Other sporting events which were going to be held between 2021 and 2023 were postponed, planned or canceled to be postponed to next year in order to avoid clash with the Olympics and Paralympics. It was speculated that the postponement of the 2022 World Athletics Championships in Eugene, United States and 2022 World Aquatic Championships in Budapest, Hungary, respectively, to 2022 could clash with the dates of the 2022 Commonwealth Games. If the dates clash, then the top athletes from athletics and swimming could miss the Games in order to participate in the World Championships. The CGF was in talks with World Athletics and World Aquatics (FINA) to avoid the clashing of the World Championships with the Commonwealth Games.

On 3 April 2020, the World Athletics announced that the World Athletic Championships in Eugene, United States, planned to be held from 6 to 15 August 2021, was anticipated to instead be held from 15 to 24 July 2022. The new dates were chosen in such a way that the Championships would not clash with the 2022 Commonwealth Games and other events. On 4 May 2020, FINA announced that the World Aquatic Championships in Fukuoka, Japan, planned to be held from 16 July to 1 August 2021, was transferred to Budapest, Hungary from 17 June to 1 July.

== Ban of Northern Irish gymnasts ==
The International Gymnastics Federation (FIG) banned Northern Irish gymnasts who represent Ireland, as opposed to Great Britain, in international competition where Northern Ireland does not compete. The decision was eventually overturned.

== During the Games ==
=== Bronze medal in women's tandem B sprint ===
Due to the late withdrawal of a team in the women's tandem B sprint race on 29 July, only four teams were entered. which, according to the rules of the Games, eliminates the awarding of the bronze medal. Because of this, there was a failure in the results system. Thus, there was an extra race for the bronze medal dispute, which was advertised as a bronze medal race, which was won by Sophie Unwin and their guide Georgia Holt, who were shown on the screen as bronze medal winners. However, when they were getting ready to go up to the podium, they were told that there were no bronze medals since competition rules state that bronze medals are not awarded in events with only four entries. The team were left in tears and protested by holding an England flag behind the podium, but were told to move by tournament officials. They later posed on the podium wearing bronze medals which they borrowed from Laura Kenny and Josie Knight. Unwin, Holt and their team manager Keith Reynolds were each fined 200 Swiss francs for "failure to respect the instructions of the commissaire/organiser". The Commonwealth Games Federation later publicly apologised and returned the money for "incorrectly indicating that it was a bronze medal race on the scoreboard and results sheet".

=== Crash in men's scratch race ===
In a men's scratch cycling race heat on 31 July, Matt Walls and his bike crashed over the upper track barrier into the crowd. Serving as a commentator for the BBC and the Guardian newspaper, Sir Chris Hoy said injuries to two spectators could have been prevented by a higher perspex barrier.

=== Wrestling arena incident ===
On 5 August, the wrestling session at the Coventry Arena was halted for nearly two hours and spectators were asked to vacate the venue after a loudspeaker fell from the ceiling at the stands destroying some benches.

=== Hockey shootout controversy ===
During the second semifinal of the women's hockey tournament between Australia and India which went into a penalty shootout, Ambrosia Malone failed to score on Australia's first shot and as India's Lalremsiami Hmarzote lined up for her shot, the umpires asked Malone to retake her shot as the timer did not start during her attempt. Malone went on to score off her second attempt and the officiating error was widely criticised. The International Hockey Federation later issued a statement, "The penalty shootout started mistakenly too early (the clock was not yet ready to operate), for which we apologise."

=== Sri Lankan delegation disappearances ===
Eleven of the 160 to 177 members of the Sri Lankan contingent at the 2022 Commonwealth Games in Birmingham, England disappeared during the Games, most of them last seen at the Athlete's Village. The incident is one of many disappearances in Sri Lankan sports going back decades.
