= Ateequr Rahman =

Bangladeshi sports shooter

- Known for: Sports shooter
- Awards: Independence Day Award (1994)

Ateekur Rahman is a Bangladeshi sports shooter. He is the first Bangladeshi alongside Abdus Sattar to win a medal for Bangladesh in the Commonwealth Games. He won two medals in 1990 Commonwealth Games. He won gold in the Air Pistol - Pairs event and bronze in the Free Pistol - Pairs event, both partnering with Abdus Sattar. Rahman was awarded the Independence Award, Bangladesh's highest civilian award, in 1995.
