= David Lee (sport shooter) =

Canadian sports shooter (born 1948)

Personal information
- Nationality: Canadian
- Born: 24 March 1948 (age 78) Long Beach, California, U.S.

Sport
- Sport: Sports shooting

David Lee (born 24 March 1948) is a Canadian sports shooter. He competed at the 1984 Summer Olympics and the 1988 Summer Olympics.
