= Asif Hossain Khan =

Bangladeshi sport shooter

Mohammad Asif Hossain Khan (Bengali: আসিফ হোসেন খান) is a Bangladeshi shooter. He won the gold medal at 2002 Commonwealth Games in 10 m Air Rifle and repeated his success in the 2004 South Asian Games by winning gold in the same event. On October 2, 2006, he was brutally beaten by the local police of Bangladesh, injuring both of his arms. His son, Mashrur, currently resides in Costa Rica with wife Natalie.

== Early career ==
Khan started his shooting career at Pabna Shooting Club. Although he preferred athletics to shooting, he snatched inter-club shooting championship in 1999 and 2000. Still an athletics fanatic, Khan entered the athletics training programme of Bangladesh Krira Shiksha Pratisthan (BKSP), the national sports institute of Bangladesh. But his career plans changed when his coach asked him to join the newly organized shooting team of BKSP. Khan agreed to his coach's proposal more as a responsibility than interest. Later, he insisted that his coaches at BKSP helped him to build his winning mentality.

Khan took part in the 2002 Bangladesh Games and achieved a bronze medal. His success was then spotted by the national scouts and he was called at the camp of that year's Commonwealth Games. Khan was surprised for his calling at the camp and found it even tougher there. But he attracted everyone with his talent and hard labor and was selected for the national team.

== Career ==
=== Commonwealth success ===
Khan took part in the 10 m Air rifle individual event in the 2002 Commonwealth Games at the age of 15. He performed well and found himself fifth before the last shot. At that moment he thought a good shot could earn him a fourth-place finish. He said,"..if I could make a good I would probably end up fourth. The bronze was a possibility but slightly unlike". His final shot scored 9.9, with a total of 691.9, and he won the gold medal.

=== Later performances ===
After the Commonwealth Games he took part in the Asian Games. Though he got a disappointing 12th-place finish he scored more points than his Commonwealth win.

In 2003 he performed respectably in the 2003 World Cup in Milan.

In 2004 he became the first Bangladeshi to take part in shooting at the Olympics. Even though he finished 35th, he considered the event as his highest honour. In 2005 Asian Championship he registered his highest ever total score that earned him a bronze medal finish.

=== Recent performances ===
Although Khan got pairs silver with Anjan in 2006 Commonwealth Games, he lost his individual gold that he had achieved four years earlier. He only scored 586 in the qualification round and 103.2 in the shoot up to be placed 5th. He also lost his medal in the 2006 SAF games to Indian shooters. He was also beaten by compatriot Imam Hossain and finished fourth.

Khan is known for his trademark shoot up, but performed poorly in this event. In the Colombo SAF Games, two of his shoot up scores were under ten with a highest of 10.7 where he used to reach 10.8 three to four times. About his poor shoot up performances he said,"I don't quite enjoy it these days. A fear works in my mind. He also thinks the pressure of expectation may be the reason for this and expect to overcome this soon.

=== Police incident with Asif Hossain Khan and his friends ===
On October 2, 2006, after an incident between police and shooting federation staff, police broke into the federation premises and assaulted several shooters including Khan. Khan and his fellow shooters were preparing for the 2006 Asian Games to be held at Doha in November 2006. An altercation occurred between a police chauffeur and a federation guard regarding the parking of a car. Following this, police came to the spot and, according to witnesses, beat "whoever they found".

Police beat Khan in multiple places and severely injured his left arm and leg. Khan said, "We, in fact, tried to stop the brawl but police would not listen to us". He also tried to protect himself by asserting his identity and success to his attackers. However, the police appeared to intensify their violence after this revelation. He, along with four other shooters and staff, were taken to the police station and beaten again. They were later sent to court by the police. Khan was granted bail from the court and was admitted to hospital. Doctors suggested that his arm muscles were badly injured and would take time to recover. His leg was also injured seriously and doctors were uncertain of when he would be able to practice again. Khan's mental and emotional trauma was also apparent as he claimed he would give up shooting. He even pondered he would give his Commonwealth Games gold medal back to the authority.

=== 2008 South Asian Shooting Championship ===
On November 22, 2008, Khan won two gold medals on the opening day of 4th South Asian Shooting Championship in Islamabad, Pakistan. He first won the individual gold in 10m Air Rifle event scoring 694.3 points, and then won the team event under the same category with shooters Saiful Islam and Imam Hossain. In the individual gold, Khan bettered his previous best score of 691 points.

== See also ==
- Shooting at the 2006 Commonwealth Games
