= Brian Girling =

British sports shooter (born 1938)

Personal information
- Nationality: British (English)
- Born: 14 May 1938 (age 88) Birmingham, West Midlands, England
- Height: 184 cm (6 ft 0 in)
- Weight: 74 kg (163 lb)

Sport
- Sport: Sports shooting
- Event: Rapid-fire pistol
Medal record
Representing England
Commonwealth Games
Gold medal – first place	1986 Edinburgh	25m rapid fire pistol (Pairs)
Bronze medal – third place	1990 Auckland	25m rapid fire pistol (Pairs)

Brian Edward Girling (born 14 May 1938) is a British former international sports shooter, who competed at the 1976 Summer Olympics and four Commonwealth Games from 1966 to 1990.

== Biography ==
At the 1976 Olympic Games in Montreal, he participated in the mixed 25 metre rapid fire pistol event.

At the age of 28 he represented England in the rapid fire pistol and centre fire pistol events, at the 1966 British Empire and Commonwealth Games in Kingston, Jamaica.

Twelve years later he competed in the rapid fire pistol event again at the 1978 Commonwealth Games in Canada. It was not until 1986 that he finally won a medal and it was a gold medal in the 25 metres rapid fire pistol pairs, at the 1986 Commonwealth Games in Edinburgh, Scotland. He was selected for a fourth Games (aged 52); that of the 1990 Commonwealth Games in Auckland, New Zealand, where he won a bronze medal in the 25 metres rapid fire pistol pairs.
