= Shakil Ahmed (sport shooter) =

Bangladeshi sport shooter

Personal information
- Full name: Shakil Ahmed
- Nationality: Bangladeshi
- Born: 1 May 1995 (age 31) Khulna, Bangladesh
- Height: 1.50 m (4 ft 11 in) (2014)
- Weight: 48 kg (106 lb) (2014)

Sport
- Country: Bangladesh
- Sport: Sports shooting
- Event: 50 m Pistol
- Coached by: Saiful Alam Rinky
Medal record
Sports shooting
Representing Bangladesh
Commonwealth Games
Silver medal – second place	2018 Gold Coast	50 m Pistol
South Asian Games
Gold medal – first place	2016 Guwahati and Shillong	50 m Pistol
- Updated on 12 April 2016

Shakil Ahmed is a Bangladeshi sports shooter. He won the gold medal in the 50 m pistol at the 2016 South Asian Games at Guwahati. He also won a bronze medal as a member of the Bangladesh team in that event. He is a member of Bangladesh Army services team.

In junior level, he won a bronze medal in the 10-meter Air Pistol Junior Group in the 8th Asian Air Gun Shooting Championship held in New Delhi.

== See also ==
- Mohammad Imam Hossain
- Sharmin Ratna
