= Gymnastics at the 2004 Summer Olympics – Women's artistic qualification =

These are the results of the women's qualification round, the preliminary round which decided the finalists for all six events for women in artistic gymnastics at the 2004 Summer Olympics in Athens. The qualification round took place on August 15 at the Olympic Indoor Hall.

The top twelve teams from the 2003 World Artistic Gymnastics Championships completed for places in the team final. Each team was allowed to bring up to six gymnasts. During qualification, each team could have up to five gymnasts compete on each apparatus, and could count the four highest scores for the team total. The eight teams with the highest scores in the qualification round advanced to the team final.

Individual gymnasts, including those who were not part of a team, competed for places in the all-around and apparatus finals. The twenty-four gymnasts with the highest scores in the all-around advanced to that final, except that each country could only send two gymnasts to the all-around final. The eight gymnasts with the highest scores on each apparatus advanced to those finals, except that each country could only send two gymnasts to each apparatus final.

In total, 98 gymnasts from 32 countries competed in the qualification round.

== Results ==
Gymnast	Country	Vault		Uneven Bars		Balance Beam		Floor Exercise		Total (All-around)	
Gymnast	Country	Score	Rank	Score	Rank	Score	Rank	Score	Rank	Score	Rank
Romania		37.925	1	37.750	6	38.599	1	38.162	1	152.436	1
Daniela Șofronie	Romania	9.425	9	9.625	6	9.487	12	9.525	8	38.062	2
Oana Ban	Romania	9.325	23	9.425	29	9.625	5	9.600	4	37.975	3
Cătălina Ponor	Romania	9.500	5			9.775	1	9.687	1	28.962	64
Monica Roșu	Romania	9.675	1	9.375	33			9.350	25	28.400	66
Alexandra Eremia	Romania			9.287	41	9.687	3	9.150	40	28.124	68
Silvia Stroescu	Romania	9.225	34	9.325	39	9.512	10			28.062	69
United States		37.599	3	38.437	2	38.137	2	37.675	3	151.848	2
Carly Patterson	United States	9.512	3	9.600	8	9.725	2	9.500	10	38.337	1
Courtney Kupets	United States	9.350	18	9.637	5	9.550	8	9.400	19	37.937	4
Mohini Bhardwaj	United States	9.337	20	9.487	22	9.350	19	9.525	8	37.699	8
Courtney McCool	United States	9.350	18	9.575	11	9.112	29	9.250	33	37.287	13
Terin Humphrey	United States			9.625	6	9.512	10	9.225	34	28.362	67
Annia Hatch	United States	9.387	13							9.387	94
China		37.199	6	38.500	1	37.849	3	37.537	6	151.085	3
Zhang Nan	China	9.287	27	9.525	18	9.550	8	9.437	15	37.799	6
Wang Tiantian	China	9.400	11	9.512	20	9.262	24	9.475	12	37.649	9
Li Ya	China	9.137	51	9.675	3	9.600	6			28.412	65
Fan Ye	China			9.600	8	9.437	16	8.975	54	28.012	70
Cheng Fei	China	9.375	16			8.925	43	9.650	2	27.950	72
Lin Li	China	8.937	76	9.700	2			8.600	67	27.237	78
Russia		37.786	2	37.612	7	37.298	4	36.724	9	149.420	4
Svetlana Khorkina	Russia	9.512	3	9.750	1	9.137	27	9.437	15	37.836	5
Anna Pavlova	Russia	9.437	8	9.237	46	9.637	4	9.400	19	37.711	7
Elena Zamolodchikova	Russia	9.462	6	9.150	51	9.062	31	9.200	35	36.874	20
Natalia Ziganchina	Russia	9.375	16	9.087	55	8.962	39	8.687	60	36.111	35
Liudmila Ezhova	Russia			9.475	23	9.462	15			18.937	84
Maria Krioutchkova	Russia	9.200	42					7.975	79	17.175	92
Ukraine		37.461	4	36.699	11	36.874	6	37.874	2	148.908	5
Alina Kozich	Ukraine	9.387	13	9.237	46	9.300	23	9.562	6	37.486	10
Irina Yarotska	Ukraine	9.262	29	9.037	59	9.475	14	9.375	22	37.149	15
Alona Kvasha	Ukraine	9.412	10	8.850	65	8.987	37	9.462	14	36.711	21
Mirabella Akhunu	Ukraine	9.237	31	8.187	80	8.350	71	9.475	12	35.249	49
Iryna Krasnianska	Ukraine			9.575	11	9.112	29			18.687	86
Olga Sherbatykh	Ukraine	9.400	11					9.087	44	18.487	87
France		37.262	5	38.049	3	36.424	7	37.024	7	148.759	6
Marine Debauve	France	9.150	50	9.500	21	9.425	17	9.362	23	37.437	11
Émilie Le Pennec	France	9.325	23	9.662	4	8.900	44	9.425	17	37.312	12
Soraya Chaouch	France	9.125	53	9.550	16	8.962	39	8.200	78	35.837	39
Isabelle Severino	France	9.337	20	9.137	52			9.175	38	27.649	76
Coralie Chacon	France	9.450	7			8.650	58	9.062	46	27.162	79
Camille Schmutz	France			9.337	37	9.137	27			18.474	89
Spain		36.899	9	37.925	4	35.486	11	37.611	4	147.921	7
Elena Gómez	Spain	9.212	39	9.525	18	8.737	54	9.500	10	36.974	18
Patricia Moreno	Spain	9.162	48	9.375	33	7.850	79	9.587	5	35.974	37
Tania Gener	Spain	9.300	25	9.575	11			9.112	43	27.987	71
Mónica Mesalles	Spain	9.225	34			9.037	33	9.412	18	27.674	75
Laura Campos	Spain	8.725	79	9.262	44	8.225	72			26.212	82
Sara Moro	Spain			9.450	26	9.487	12			18.937	84
Australia		36.574	12	37.461	8	36.948	5	36.436	11	147.419	8
Allana Slater	Australia	9.212	39	8.875	63	9.587	7	9.337	26	37.011	17
Monette Russo	Australia	9.050	67	9.437	27	8.887	46	9.062	46	36.436	25
Stephanie Moorhouse	Australia	8.875	77	9.337	37	9.162	26	8.850	57	36.224	30
Melissa Munro	Australia	9.225	34			9.312	22	9.187	36	27.724	73
Karen Nguyen	Australia	9.087	63	9.300	40			8.725	59	27.112	80
Lisa Skinner	Australia			9.387	31	8.700	55			18.087	90
Brazil		36.924	8	37.162	9	36.261	8	36.998	8	147.345	9
Daniele Hypólito	Brazil	8.987	73	9.575	11	9.337	20	9.187	36	37.086	16
Camila Comin	Brazil	9.200	42	9.412	30	8.662	57	9.137	41	36.411	26
Ana Paula Rodrigues	Brazil	9.087	63	9.375	33	8.887	46	9.037	50	36.386	27
Laís Souza	Brazil	9.387	13	8.762	69	9.375	18	8.675	62	36.199	34
Daiane dos Santos	Brazil	9.250	30	8.800	67			9.637	3	27.687	74
Caroline Molinari	Brazil					7.512	83			7.512	98
Canada		36.749	10	36.912	10	35.675	10	37.611	4	146.947	10
Kate Richardson	Canada	9.212	39	9.275	42	9.175	25	9.562	6	37.224	14
Melanie Banville	Canada	9.200	42	9.062	57	9.025	34	9.362	23	36.649	22
Amelie Plante	Canada	9.112	58	9.475	23	8.075	76	9.287	31	35.949	38
Heather Purnell	Canada	9.200	42	8.712	70	8.500	67	9.400	19	35.812	40
Kylie Stone	Canada	9.137	51			8.975	38	8.912	56	27.024	81
Gael Mackie	Canada			9.100	54					9.100	95
Great Britain		36.724	11	36.449	12	35.937	9	36.687	10	145.797	11
Beth Tweddle	Great Britain	9.012	71	9.575	11	9.025	34	9.300	30	36.912	19
Katy Lennon	Great Britain	9.237	31	8.850	65	9.025	34	9.125	42	36.237	28
Vanessa Hobbs	Great Britain	9.237	31	8.437	73	8.937	42	9.087	44	35.698	44
Nicola Willis	Great Britain	9.025	70	8.937	60	7.625	81	9.175	38	34.762	53
Cherrelle Fennell	Great Britain	9.225	34	9.087	55			9.012	52	27.324	77
Elizabeth Line	Great Britain					8.950	41			8.950	96
North Korea		37.037	7	37.812	5	34.286	12	35.237	12	144.372	12
Pyon Kwang-Sun	North Korea	9.200	42	9.600	8	9.062	31	8.650	65	36.512	23
Kim Un-Jong	North Korea	9.125	53	9.475	23	8.412	70	9.050	48	36.062	36
Hong Su-Jong	North Korea	9.075	65	9.200	48	8.212	73	8.475	72	34.962	50
Ri Hae-Yon	North Korea	8.762	78	8.862	64	8.600	61	8.687	60	34.911	52
Kang Yun-Mi	North Korea	9.637	2					8.850	57	18.487	87
Han Jong-Ok	North Korea			9.537	17	8.000	78			17.537	91
Stefani Bismpikou	Greece	9.100	60	9.387	31	9.337	20	8.662	64	36.486	24
Aagje Vanwalleghem	Belgium	9.275	28	9.200	48	8.825	51	8.925	55	36.225	29
Leyanet González	Cuba	9.337	20	8.787	68	8.775	53	9.325	28	36.224	30
Jana Komrsková	Czech Republic	9.225	34	9.275	42	8.700	55	9.012	52	36.212	32
Manami Ishizaka	Japan	9.125	53	9.187	50	8.637	59	9.262	32	36.211	33
Lisa Brüggemann	Germany	9.100	60	9.250	45	8.837	50	8.612	66	35.799	41
Suzanne Harmes	Netherlands	9.125	53	9.137	52	8.162	74	9.337	26	35.761	42
Melanie Marti	Switzerland	9.112	58	9.050	58	8.525	65	9.050	48	35.737	43
Yvonne Musik	Germany	9.125	53	8.887	62	8.562	64	9.037	50	35.611	45
Laura van Leeuwen	Netherlands	9.037	69	9.437	27	8.600	61	8.412	73	35.486	46
Zuzana Sekerová	Slovakia	9.162	48	8.912	61	8.787	52	8.512	69	35.373	47
Maria Teresa Gargano	Italy	9.100	60	8.287	78	8.612	60	9.325	28	35.324	48
Kyoko Oshima	Japan	8.662	82	9.362	36	8.437	69	8.500	70	34.961	51
Monica Bergamelli	Italy	9.300	25	8.250	79	8.862	49	8.300	76	34.712	54
Veronica Wagner	Sweden	8.975	75	8.350	74	8.900	44	8.250	77	34.475	55
Celeste Carnevale	Argentina	9.050	67	8.325	75	8.525	65	8.362	74	34.262	56
Maria Apostolidi	Greece	9.075	65	7.712	84	8.450	68	8.675	62	33.912	57
Brenda Magaña	Mexico	9.200	42	8.575	71	7.625	81	8.487	71	33.887	58
Yulia Tarasenka	Belarus	8.987	73	7.925	83	7.837	80	8.537	68	33.286	59
Zandre Labuschagne	South Africa	9.012	71	8.312	76	8.075	76	7.525	83	32.924	60
María José de la Fuente	Bolivia	8.625	83	8.312	76	7.387	85	8.325	75	32.649	61
Park Kyung-Ah	South Korea	8.512	84	7.937	82	7.437	84	7.812	80	31.698	62
Krisztina Szarka	Hungary	8.712	80	7.012	85	8.150	75	7.787	81	31.661	63
Laura Moreno	Mexico			8.512	72	8.575	63	7.700	82	24.787	83
Evgeniya Kuznetsova	Bulgaria			8.150	81	8.887	46			17.037	93
Oksana Chusovitina	Uzbekistan	8.675	81							8.675	97

== Finalists ==
=== Team all-around ===
Rank	Team	Vault	Uneven Bars	Balance Beam	Floor Exercise	Total
1	Romania	37.925	37.750	38.599	38.162	152.436
2	United States	37.599	38.437	38.137	37.675	151.848
3	China	37.199	38.500	37.849	37.537	151.085
4	Russia	37.786	37.612	37.298	36.724	149.420
5	Ukraine	37.461	36.699	36.874	37.874	148.908
6	France	37.262	38.049	36.424	37.024	148.759
7	Spain	36.899	37.925	35.486	37.611	147.921
8	Australia	36.574	37.461	36.948	36.436	147.419

=== Individual all-around ===
Rank	Team	Vault	Uneven Bars	Balance Beam	Floor Exercise	Total
1	Carly Patterson (USA)	9.512	9.600	9.725	9.500	38.337
2	Daniela Șofronie (ROU)	9.425	9.625	9.487	9.525	38.062
3	Oana Ban (ROU)**	9.325	9.425	9.625	9.600	37.975
4	Courtney Kupets (USA)	9.350	9.637	9.550	9.400	37.937
5	Svetlana Khorkina (RUS)	9.512	9.750	9.137	9.437	37.836
6	Zhang Nan (CHN)	9.287	9.525	9.550	9.437	37.799
7	Anna Pavlova (RUS)	9.437	9.237	9.637	9.400	37.711
9	Wang Tiantian (CHN)	9.400	9.512	9.262	9.475	37.649
10	Alina Kozich (UKR)	9.387	9.237	9.300	9.562	37.486
11	Marine Debauve (FRA)	9.150	9.500	9.425	9.362	37.437
12	Émilie Le Pennec (FRA)	9.325	9.662	8.900	9.425	37.312
13	Kate Richardson (CAN)	9.212	9.275	9.175	9.562	37.224
14	Irina Yarotska (UKR)	9.262	9.037	9.475	9.375	37.149
15	Daniele Hypólito (BRA)	8.987	9.575	9.337	9.187	37.086
16	Allana Slater (AUS)	9.212	8.875	9.587	9.337	37.011
17	Elena Gómez (ESP)	9.212	9.525	8.737	9.500	36.974
18	Beth Tweddle (GBR)	9.012	9.575	9.025	9.300	36.912
19	Melanie Banville (CAN)	9.200	9.062	9.025	9.362	36.649
20	Pyon Kwang-Sun (PRK)	9.200	9.600	9.062	8.650	36.512
21	Stefani Bismpikou (GRE)	9.100	9.387	9.337	8.662	36.486
22	Monette Russo (AUS)**	9.050	9.437	8.887	9.062	36.436
23	Camila Comin (BRA)	9.200	9.412	8.662	9.137	36.411
24	Katy Lennon (GBR)	9.237	8.850	9.025	9.125	36.237
25	Aagje Vanwalleghem (BEL)	9.275	9.200	8.825	8.925	36.225
26	Leyanet González (CUB)	9.337	8.787	8.775	9.325	36.224
27	Stephanie Moorhouse (AUS)	8.875	9.337	9.162	8.850	36.224

**Oana Ban and Monette Russo had to withdraw from the all-around final due to injury, and were replaced with the next qualifying gymnasts, Leyanet González and Stephanie Moorhouse.

=== Vault ===
Rank	Gymnast	Score
1	Monica Roșu (ROU)	9.675
2	Kang Yun-Mi (PRK)	9.637
3	Elena Zamolodchikova (RUS)	9.462
4	Coralie Chacon (FRA)	9.450
5	Anna Pavlova (RUS)	9.437
6	Alona Kvasha (UKR)	9.412
7	Wang Tiantian (CHN)	9.400
8	Annia Hatch (USA)	9.387

=== Uneven bars ===
Rank	Gymnast	Score
1	Svetlana Khorkina (RUS)	9.750
2	Lin Li (CHN)	9.700
3	Li Ya (CHN)	9.675
4	Émilie Le Pennec (FRA)	9.662
5	Courtney Kupets (USA)	9.637
6	Daniela Șofronie (ROU)	9.625
6	Terin Humphrey (USA)	9.625
8	Pyon Kwang-Sun (PRK)	9.600

=== Balance beam ===
Rank	Gymnast	Score
1	Cătălina Ponor (ROU)	9.775
2	Carly Patterson (USA)	9.725
3	Alexandra Eremia (ROU)	9.687
4	Anna Pavlova (RUS)	9.637
5	Li Ya (CHN)	9.600
6	Allana Slater (AUS)	9.587
7	Courtney Kupets (USA)	9.550
7	Zhang Nan (CHN)	9.550

=== Floor exercise ===
Rank	Gymnast	Score
1	Cătălina Ponor (ROU)	9.687
2	Cheng Fei (CHN)	9.650
3	Daiane dos Santos (BRA)	9.637
4	Patricia Moreno (ESP)	9.587
5	Kate Richardson (CAN)	9.562
5	Alina Kozich (UKR)	9.562
7	Daniela Șofronie (ROU)	9.525
7	Mohini Bhardwaj (USA)	9.525
