= Australia at the World Artistic Gymnastics Championships =

- Flag of Australia
- IOC code: AUS
- Medals: Gold 2 Silver 4 Bronze 4 Total 10

At the 2001 World Championships Philippe Rizzo became the first Australian gymnast to win a medal, winning a silver on horizontal bar. Five years later he became the first Australian to win a gold medal. Australian women won their first medal as a team in 2003. In 2005 Monette Russo became the first Australian woman to win an individual medal, earning bronze in the all-around. At the 2010 World Championships Lauren Mitchell became the first Australian woman to win a gold medal.

== Medalists ==
Medal	Name	Year	Event
Silver	Philippe Rizzo	(Belgium) 2001 Ghent	Men's horizontal bar
Bronze	Allana Slater, Monette Russo, Belinda Archer, Jacqui Dunn, Stephanie Moorhouse, Danielle Kelly	(United States) 2003 Anaheim	Women's team
Bronze	Monette Russo	(Australia) 2005 Melbourne	Women's all-around
Silver	Prashanth Sellathurai	(Denmark) 2006 Aarhus	Men's pommel horse
Gold	Philippe Rizzo	(Denmark) 2006 Aarhus	Men's horizontal bar
Bronze	Prashanth Sellathurai	(United Kingdom) 2009 London	Men's pommel horse
Silver	Lauren Mitchell	(United Kingdom) 2009 London	Women's balance beam
Silver	Lauren Mitchell	(United Kingdom) 2009 London	Women's floor exercise
Bronze	Prashanth Sellathurai	(Netherlands) 2010 Rotterdam	Men's pommel horse
Gold	Lauren Mitchell	(Netherlands) 2010 Rotterdam	Women's floor exercise

== Medal tables ==
=== By gender ===
Gender	Gold	Silver	Bronze	Total
Men	1	2	2	5
Women	1	2	2	5
