= Australia women's national artistic gymnastics team =

National sports team

Australia
- National federation: Gymnastics Australia

Olympic Games
- Appearances: 7

World Championships
- Appearances: 20
- Medals: Bronze: 2003

The Australia women's national artistic gymnastics team represents Australia in FIG international competitions.

== History ==
Australia has participated in the Olympic Games women's team competition seven times. It has also participated in the women's team competition at the World Artistic Gymnastics Championships 20 times, winning a bronze medal in 2003.

== Senior roster ==
Name	Birthdate and age	Hometown
Asher Bayles	10 December 2006 (age 19)	Geelong, Victoria
Georgia Godwin	28 October 1997 (age 29)	Gold Coast, Queensland
Kate McDonald	1 August 2000 (age 26)	Waverley, Victoria
Emma Nedov	11 March 1996 (age 30)	Sydney, New South Wales
Ruby Pass	17 May 2007 (age 19)	Figtree, New South Wales
Breanna Scott	12 December 2001 (age 24)	Sydney, New South Wales
Kate Sayer	8 March 2003 (age 23)	Sunnybank, Queensland
Emily Whitehead	11 December 2000 (age 25)	Waverley, Victoria

== Team competition results ==
=== Olympic Games ===
- 1964 — 10th place
  Jan Bedford, Val Buffham-Norris, Barbara Cage, Barbara Fletcher, Lynette Hancock, Valerie Roberts
- 1992 — 7th place
  Monique Allen, Brooke Gysen, Julie-Anne Monico, Lisa Read, Kylie Shadbolt, Jane Warrilow
- 1996 — 10th place
  Joanna Hughes, Nicole Kantek, Ruth Moniz, Lisa Moro, Lisa Skinner, Jennyfer Smith, Kirsty-Leigh Brown
- 2000 — 7th place
  Melinda Cleland, Alex Croak, Trudy McIntosh, Lisa Skinner, Allana Slater, Brooke Walker
- 2004 — 8th place
  Stephanie Moorhouse, Melissa Munro, Karen Nguyen, Monette Russo, Lisa Skinner, Allana Slater
- 2008 — 6th place
  Ashleigh Brennan, Georgia Bonora, Daria Joura, Lauren Mitchell, Shona Morgan, Olivia Vivian
- 2012 — 10th place
  Ashleigh Brennan, Georgia Bonora, Emily Little, Larrissa Miller, Lauren Mitchell
- 2024 – 10th place
  Kate McDonald, Emma Nedov, Ruby Pass, Breanna Scott, Emily Whitehead

=== World Championships ===
- 1934 — did not participate
- 1938 — did not participate
- 1950 — did not participate
- 1954 — did not participate
- 1958 — did not participate
- 1962 — did not participate
- 1966 — did not participate
- 1970 — 18th place
  Jan Bedford, Sharman Cook, Dorothy Doig, Pamela Evans, Coralie Hill, Jennifer Sunderland
- 1974 — 21st place
- 1978 — 20th place
- 1979 — 20th place
  Kerryn Bailey, Kerry Bayliss, Janice Edelsten, Karen Edelsten, Leanne Stevens, Marina Sulicich
- 1981 — 17th place
  Heidi Amundsen, Wanita Lynch, Joanne McCallum, Philippa Ray, Jenny Roberts, Kellie Wilson
- 1983 — 23rd place
  Keri Battersby, Jennifer Curtin, Susan Miller, Ilana Sharp, Susan Turnbull, Michelle White
- 1985 — 17th place
  Debbie Graham, Leanne Rycroft, Michelle Saliba, Carolyn Stewart, Susan Turnbull, Kellie Wilson
- 1987 — 18th place
  Monique Allen, Kellie Larter, Lisa Read, Leanne Rycroft, Carolyn Stewart, Katie Watts
- 1989 — 16th place
  Monique Allen, Jenny Clack, Jodie Rogers, Kylie Shadbolt, Michelle Telfer, Jane Warrilow
- 1991 — 6th place
  Monique Allen, Joanna Hughes, Julie-Anne Monico, Lisa Read, Kylie Shadbolt, Michelle Telfer
- 1994 — did not participate
- 1995 — 12th place
  Kirsty-Leigh Brown, Joanna Hughes, Nicole Kantek, Ruth Moniz, Lisa Moro, Genevieve Preston, Lisa Skinner
- 1997 — 11th place
  Rebekah Armbruster, Zeena McLaughin, Ruth Moniz, Lisa Skinner, Rebecca Wilson
- 1999 — 4th place
  Jacqui Dunn, Trudy McIntosh, Lisa Skinner, Allana Slater, Jennyfer Smith, Brooke Walker
- 2001 — 7th place
  Alex Croak, Jacqui Dunn, Allison Johnston, Allana Slater, Kylie Tanner, Jessica Zarnay
- 2003 — bronze medal
  Belinda Archer, Jacqui Dunn, Danielle Kelly, Stephanie Moorhouse, Monette Russo, Allana Slater
- 2006 — 6th place
  Georgia Bonora, Hollie Dykes, Melody Hernandez, Daria Joura, Karen Nguyen, Olivia Vivian
- 2007 — 11th place
  Ashleigh Brennan, Hollie Dykes, Daria Joura, Lauren Mitchell, Shona Morgan, Chloe Sims
- 2010 — 6th place
  Georgia Bonora, Ashleigh Brennan, Emily Little, Larrissa Miller, Lauren Mitchell
- 2011 — 8th place
  Ashleigh Brennan, Georgia Rose Brown, Emily Little, Larrissa Miller, Lauren Mitchell, Mary-Anne Monckton
- 2014 — 7th place
  Georgia Rose Brown, Larrissa Miller, Mary-Anne Monckton, Kiara Munteanu, Emma Nedov, Olivia Vivian
- 2023 – 9th (qualifications)
  Georgia Godwin, Kate McDonald, Ruby Pass, Breanna Scott, Emily Whitehead

== Most decorated gymnasts ==
This list includes all Australian female artistic gymnasts who have won a medal at the Olympic Games or the World Artistic Gymnastics Championships.

Rank	Gymnast	Team	AA	VT	UB	BB	FX	Olympic Total	World Total	Total
1	Lauren Mitchell					2009	2010; 2009	0	3	3
2	Monette Russo	2003	2005					0	2	2
3	Belinda Archer	2003						0	1	1
3	Jacqui Dunn	2003						0	1	1
3	Danielle Kelly	2003						0	1	1
3	Stephanie Moorhouse	2003						0	1	1
3	Allana Slater	2003						0	1	1

== See also ==
- Women's gymnastics in Australia
- List of Olympic female artistic gymnasts for Australia
