= Danielle Kelly =

Australian artistic gymnast

- Born: 24 May 1986 (age 40) Melbourne, Australia

Gymnastics career
- Discipline: Women's artistic gymnastics
- Country represented: Australia (2002-2004)
- Club: Queensland Academy of Sport
Medal record
Representing Australia
World Championships
Bronze medal – third place	2003 Anaheim	Team

Danielle Kelly (born 24 May 1986) is an Australian former artistic gymnast. She won a bronze medal at the 2003 World Championships in the team competition.

== Gymnastics career ==
Kelly first joined the senior national team in 2002. She finished seventeenth in the all-around at the 2003 WOGA Classic. She then competed at the 2003 Pacific Challenge with Hayley Tyrell, Lisa Skinner, Monette Russo, Jacqui Dunn, and Stephanie Moorhouse, and the team finished fourth. She was selected to represent Australia at the 2003 World Artistic Gymnastics Championships alongside Monette Russo, Belinda Archer, Allana Slater, Jacqui Dunn, and Stephanie Moorhouse. During the qualification round, Kelly scored a 9.050 on vault and an 8.437 on the floor exercise to help the team qualify for the team final in seventh place. Kelly did not compete in the team final, but received the bronze medal that the team won, which was Australia's first team medal at the World Artistic Gymnastics Championships.

Kelly was selected to represent Australia at the 2004 Summer Olympics; however, she tore a calf muscle before the competition and had to withdraw. She was replaced by Karen Nguyen.
