= Belinda Archer =

Australian artistic gymnast

- Born: 6 February 1987 (age 39)

Gymnastics career
- Discipline: Women's artistic gymnastics
- Country represented: Australia (2002–2005)
- Club: Australian Institute of Sport
- Retired: 2005
Medal record
Representing Australia
World Championships
Bronze medal – third place	2003 Anaheim	Team

Belinda Archer (born 6 February 1987) is an Australian former artistic gymnast. She won a bronze medal at the 2003 World Championships in the team competition, which was Australia's first team medal at the World Artistic Gymnastics Championships.

== Gymnastics career ==
Archer trained at the Australian Institute of Sport in Canberra on a scholarship from 2001 until 2005. She was added to Australia's junior national team in 2002. She was selected to represent Australia at the 2003 World Artistic Gymnastics Championships in Anaheim alongside Monette Russo, Danielle Kelly, Allana Slater, Jacqui Dunn, and Stephanie Moorhouse. During the qualification round, Archer placed forty-fifth in the all-around with a total score of 34.974 to help the team qualify for the team final in seventh place. During the team final, she contributed scores of 9.275 on vault and 8.812 on the floor exercise to help Australia win the team bronze medal behind the United States and Romania. This was Australia's first team medal and only their second medal at all at the World Artistic Gymnastics Championships, and this result secured Australia a team spot at the 2004 Olympic Games. After the World Championships, she competed at the Marsillia Cup in Marseille alongside Allana Slater, Monette Russo, Stephanie Moorhouse, and Melissa Munro, and they won the team bronze medal.

Archer did not compete at the 2004 Australian Championships due to a knee injury. She was not selected for the 2004 Olympic team. She retired from gymnastics in 2005.

== Post-retirement ==
Archer was inducted into the AIS Gymnastics Hall of Fame. She currently works as a dietitian and a personal trainer.
