= Jacqui Dunn =

Australian artistic gymnast

- Full name: Jacqueline Grace Dunn
- Born: 3 May 1984 (age 42)
- Height: 152 cm (5 ft 0 in)

Gymnastics career
- Discipline: Women's artistic gymnastics
- Country represented: Australia
Medal record
Representing Australia
World Championships
Bronze medal – third place	2003 Anaheim	Team
World Cup Final
Silver medal – second place	2002 Stuttgart	Uneven bars
Commonwealth Games
Gold medal – first place	2002 Manchester	Team
Bronze medal – third place	2002 Manchester	Balance beam

Jacqueline Grace "Jacqui" Dunn (born 3 May 1984) is an Australian former artistic gymnast. She won a bronze medal at the 2003 World Championships in the team competition, which was Australia's first team medal at the World Artistic Gymnastics Championships. She is the 2002 World Cup Final uneven bars silver medalist.

== Gymnastics career ==
Dunn competed with the Australian team that initially finished fifth at the 1999 World Championships, although they moved up to fourth place upon the disqualification of the Chinese team. She placed fifth in the all-around at the 2000 Australian Championships. She advanced into the uneven bars at the 2001 Goodwill Games and finished eighth. At the 2001 Australian Championships, she became the national all-around champion.

Dunn helped the Australian team place seventh at the 2001 World Championships. Additionally, she advanced into the all-around final, where she finished 29th. She also advanced into the uneven bars final and finished sixth. After the World Championships, she won the gold medal on the uneven bars at the Stuttgart World Cup.

Dunn represented Australia at the 2002 Commonwealth Games and helped the team win the gold medal with the top balance beam score of the competition. She went on the win the bronze medal in the balance beam final, behind Canada's Kate Richardson and teammate Allana Slater. At the 2002 Cottbus World Cup, she won a silver medal on the uneven bars behind Beth Tweddle. Then at the 2002 World Cup Final, she won a silver medal on the uneven bars behind Oana Petrovschi.

She was selected to represent Australia at the 2003 World Artistic Gymnastics Championships in Anaheim alongside Monette Russo, Danielle Kelly, Allana Slater, Belinda Archer, and Stephanie Moorhouse. During the qualification round, she competed on the vault, uneven bars, and balance beam to help the team qualify for the team final in seventh place. During the team final, she contributed scores of 9.375 on the uneven bars and 8.675 on the balance beam to help Australia win the team bronze medal behind the United States and Romania. This was Australia's first team medal and only their second medal at all at the World Artistic Gymnastics Championships, and this result secured Australia a team spot at the 2004 Olympic Games. Dunn was not selected for the 2004 Olympic team.

== Post-gymnastics career ==
Dunn was inducted into the Australian Institute of Sport Gymnastics Hall of Fame. In 2024, she was named the team manager Aussie Spirit. As of 2026, she is the Director of Performance and Pathways for Softball South Australia.

== Eponymous skill ==
Dunn has a balance beam mount named after her in the Code of Points.

Apparatus	Name	Description	Difficulty (Note: Valid for the 2025–2028 Code of Points)
Balance beam	Dunn	Round-off at end of beam - flic-flac with ½ turn (180°) and walkover forward	F (0.6)
