= 2003 World Artistic Gymnastics Championships =

Gymnastics competition

- Venue: Arrowhead Pond
- Location: Anaheim, California, United States
- Start date: August 16, 2003
- End date: August 24, 2003

The 37th World Artistic Gymnastics Championships were held in Anaheim, California, United States, from 16 to 24 August 2003.

Tie-breakers were not used at this competition. If two gymnasts received identical scores in the event finals, they were both awarded medals for their placement.

== Medalists ==
Event	Gold	Silver	Bronze
Men
Team	China; Huang Xu; Li Xiaopeng; Teng Haibin; Xiao Qin; Xing Aowei; Yang Wei	United States; Raj Bhavsar; Jason Gatson; Morgan Hamm; Paul Hamm; Brett McClure; Blaine Wilson	Japan; Takehiro Kashima; Hiroyuki Tomita; Naoya Tsukahara; Tatsuya Yamada
All-around	(United States) Paul Hamm	(China) Yang Wei	(Japan) Hiroyuki Tomita
Floor exercise	(United States) Paul Hamm (Bulgaria) Yordan Yovchev	none awarded	(Canada) Kyle Shewfelt
Pommel horse	(China) Teng Haibin (Japan) Takehiro Kashima	none awarded	(Russia) Nikolai Kryukov
Rings	(Bulgaria) Yordan Yovchev (Greece) Demosthenes Tampakos	none awarded	(Italy) Andrea Coppolino (Italy) Matteo Morandi
Vault	(China) Li Xiaopeng	(Romania) Marian Drăgulescu	(Canada) Kyle Shewfelt
Parallel bars	(China) Li Xiaopeng	(China) Huang Xu (Russia) Alexei Nemov	none awarded
Horizontal bar	(Japan) Takehiro Kashima	(Italy) Igor Cassina	(Russia) Alexei Nemov
Women
Team	United States; Chellsie Memmel; Carly Patterson; Tasha Schwikert; Hollie Vise; Terin Humphrey; Courtney Kupets	Romania; Cătălina Ponor; Oana Ban; Alexandra Eremia; Andreea Munteanu; Monica Roșu; Florica Leonida	Australia; Allana Slater; Monette Russo; Belinda Archer; Jacqui Dunn; Stephanie Moorhouse; Danielle Kelly
All-around	(Russia) Svetlana Khorkina	(United States) Carly Patterson	(China) Zhang Nan
Vault	(Uzbekistan) Oksana Chusovitina	(Russia) Elena Zamolodchikova (North Korea) Kang Yun Mi	none awarded
Uneven bars	(United States) Chellsie Memmel (United States) Hollie Vise	none awarded	(United Kingdom) Beth Tweddle
Balance beam	(China) Fan Ye	(Romania) Cătălina Ponor	(Russia) Ludmila Ezhova
Floor exercise	(Brazil) Daiane dos Santos	(Romania) Cătălina Ponor	(Spain) Elena Gómez

== Men ==
=== Qualification ===
Rank	Team	Floor (gymnastics)	Pommel horse	Rings (gymnastics)	Vault (gymnastics)	Parallel bars	Horizontal bar	Total
1	Naoya Tsukahara (JPN)	9.45	9.55	9.562	9.425	9.637	9.6	57.224
2	Paul Hamm (USA)	9.562	9.487	9.587	9.512	9.5	9.2	56.848
3	Tae-Young Yang (KOR)	9.275	9.425	9.675	9.7	9.387	9.287	56.749
4	Jason Gatson (USA)	9.412	9.237	9.7	9.325	9.512	9.55	56.736
5	Marian Drăgulescu (ROM)	9.575	9.125	9.525	9.825	9.3	9.3	56.65
6	Hiroyuki Tomita (JPN)	9.087	9.387	9.675	9.125	9.55	9.6	56.424
7	Takehiro Kashima (JPN)	9	9.675	9.312	9.375	9.225	9.7	56.287
8	Blaine Wilson (USA)	8.987	8.6	9.675	9.575	9.65	9.562	56.049
9	Razvan Dorin Selariu (ROM)	9.1	9.3	9.587	9.65	9.012	9.35	55.999
10	Yang Wei (CHN)	8.587	9.45	9.575	9.75	9.65	8.975	55.987
11	Yordan Yovchev (BUL)	9.6	8.8	9.8	9.4	9.387	8.837	55.824
12	Roman Zozulia (UKR)	9.512	8.45	9.675	9.6	9.575	8.95	55.762
13	Dimitri Karbanenko (FRA)	9.2	8.9	9.3	9.637	9.062	9.587	55.686
14	Denis Savenkov (BLR)	9.15	9.45	8.662	9.45	9.25	9.575	55.537
15	Rafael Martínez (ESP)	9.325	9.05	9.25	9.425	9.462	9.025	55.537
16	Eric Lopez Rios (CUB)	8.312	9.025	9.562	9.6	9.612	9.337	55.448
17	Evgueni Podgorny (RUS)	9.187	9.387	9.312	9.25	9.362	8.937	55.435
18	Ioan Silviu Suciu (ROM)	8.662	9.675	9.037	9.637	9.187	9.15	55.348
19	Alexei Bondarenko (RUS)	9.45	8.275	9.237	9.437	9.437	9.437	55.273
20	Víctor Cano (ESP)	9.287	9.362	9.562	9.1	8.775	9.112	55.198
21	Alexander Jeltkov (CAN)	9.325	8.737	8.487	9.475	9.325	9.65	54.999
22	Andreas Schweizer (SUI)	8.45	8.95	9.675	9.35	9.162	9.237	54.824
23	Yernar Yerimbetov (KAZ)	9.225	9.312	9.237	9.6	9.425	8	54.799
24	Pavel Gofman (ISR)	9.087	9	9.462	9.225	9	9.025	54.799
25	Ruslan Myezyentsev (UKR)	8.9	9.062	9.55	9.425	8.925	8.912	54.774
26	Dan Nicolae Potra (ROM)	8.812	9.362	9.562	9.4	8.95	8.687	54.773
27	Florent Marée (FRA)	8.425	8.325	9.512	9.575	9.2	9.712	54.749
28	David Kikuchi (CAN)	8.587	9.362	9.437	9.275	9.012	9.012	54.685
29	Johan Mounard (FRA)	8.862	9.1	8.725	9.45	9.462	9.075	54.674
30	Olexander Svitlichni (UKR)	8.987	9.175	9.3	9.287	8.862	9.05	54.661
31	Igors Vihrovs (LAT)	9.525	8.875	8.875	9.412	8.775	9.012	54.474
32	Runar Alexandersson (ISL)	8.45	9.537	9.35	8.912	9.425	8.712	54.386
33	Sven Kwiatkowski (GER)	9.112	8.8	8.862	9.5	9.337	8.725	54.336
34	Lazaro Lamelas Ramirez (CUB)	8.425	9.012	9.512	9.35	8.75	9.212	54.261
35	Shu Wai Ng (MAS)	9.537	7.725	9.462	9.512	8.8	9.2	54.236
36	Róbert Gál (HUN)	9.537	8.875	8.862	9.6	9.125	8.187	54.186
37	Vlasios Maras (GRE)	8.987	8.625	8.537	9.45	9.25	9.337	54.186
38	Evgeni Sapronenko (LAT)	9.037	9.212	9.362	9.162	8.2	8.975	53.948
39	Jorge Hugo Giraldo (COL)	8.95	9.1	8.375	9.35	9.462	8.687	53.924
40	Olexander Beresh (UKR)	8.9	9.375	8.162	9.587	8.55	9.325	53.899
41	Giovanni Quintero (COL)	8.05	8.325	9.487	9.212	9.475	9.3	53.849
42	Filipe Bezugo (POR)	9.175	8.775	8.562	9.362	9.062	8.912	53.848
43	Stepan Gorbachev (KAZ)	8.45	9.175	8.675	9.325	9.1	9.05	53.775
44	Enrico Pozzo (ITA)	9.387	8.325	8.275	9.325	8.975	9.462	53.749
45	Mosiah Rodrigues (BRA)	8.525	9.3	8.45	9.3	8.575	9.475	53.625
46	Roger Sager (SUI)	8.375	9.15	8.225	9.45	8.9	9.475	53.575
47	Ilia Giorgadze (GEO)	8.675	8.375	9.412	9.237	8.775	9.037	53.511
48	Danilo Nogueira (BRA)	8.45	8.15	9.475	9.3	9.187	8.887	53.449
49	Ronny Ziesmer (GER)	8.875	8.3	9.612	9.425	8.375	8.837	53.424
50	Luis Vargas (PUR)	8.787	8.412	9.062	9.075	8.75	9.212	53.298
51	José Luis Fuentes (VEN)	8.162	9.025	8.712	8.9	9	9.387	53.186
52	Niki Boeschenstein (SUI)	8.662	8.175	8.8	9.525	9.35	8.612	53.124
53	Alexander Kruzhylov (BLR)	9	8.75	8.437	9.387	8.575	8.937	53.086
54	Philippe Rizzo (AUS)	8	8.962	8.6	9.075	8.65	9.687	52.974
55	Erik Revelinsh (LAT)	8.587	9.425	9.562	9.237	7.5	8.65	52.961
56	Charles Leon Tamayo (CUB)	7.175	8.9	9.475	9.362	9.412	8.6	52.924
57	Leszek Blanik (POL)	8.6	7.975	9.5	9.637	8.6	8.6	52.912
58	Lin Yung-Hsi (TPE)	8.55	8.762	9.375	9.325	8.55	8.35	52.912
59	Matteo Morandi (ITA)	8.737	8.475	9.712	9.437	7.8	8.75	52.911
60	Christian Berczes (GER)	8.4	8.525	9.637	9.537	8.05	8.7	52.849
61	Lin Hsiang-Wei (TPE)	8.575	9.35	8.65	9.312	8.675	8.237	52.799
62	Jani Tanskanen (FIN)	8.825	9.025	8.2	8.975	8.262	9.462	52.749
63	John Carroll (AUS)	8.012	8.025	9.425	9.475	8.762	9.025	52.724
64	Ildar Valyeev (KAZ)	8.612	8.875	8.975	8.8	9.237	8.175	52.674
65	Samuel Piasecký (SVK)	8.662	8	8.4	9.262	9.187	9.1	52.611
66	Vahag Stepanyan (ARM)	8.537	8.612	9.062	8.837	9.1	8.45	52.598
67	Jong U Chol (PRK)	8.35	8.237	8.712	9.375	9.6	8.3	52.574
68	Kanukai Jackson (GBR)	7.875	9.487	9.6	9.375	8.275	7.95	52.562
69	Radoslav Stefanov (BUL)	9.412	8.9	7.975	9.287	8.175	8.812	52.561
70	Martin Konečný (CZE)	9.075	7.2	8.837	9.412	8.962	9	52.486
71	Jeffrey Wammes (NED)	9.062	7.912	8.612	9.112	8.612	9.112	52.422
72	Anton Fokin (UZB)	8.225	8.65	9.2	9.3	9.175	7.762	52.312
73	Filip Ude (CRO)	9.05	8.3	8.262	9.425	8.525	8.712	52.274
74	Diego Lizardi (PUR)	8.837	7.3	9.512	9.025	8.6	8.975	52.249
75	Linas Gaveika (LTU)	8.15	8.7	8.312	8.962	8.55	9.412	52.086
76	Ross Brewer (GBR)	8.687	8.275	8.787	9.025	8.937	8.275	51.986
77	Eduard Gholub (ISR)	8.425	8.225	9.55	9.012	8.462	8.3	51.974
78	Federico Martin Molinari (ARG)	8.437	8.15	9.25	9.25	8.575	8.25	51.912
79	Timur Kurbanbayev (KAZ)	8.3	8.4	9.6	9.4	8	8.187	51.887
80	Jan Petrovic (SVK)	8.125	8.375	9.45	9.375	8.5	8.062	51.887
81	Alexander Benko (SVK)	8.3	8.825	8.65	9.437	8.1	8.525	51.837
82	Manuel Aleman (MEX)	8.625	7.925	9.437	9.325	8.475	8.037	51.824
83	Carycel Briceno (VEN)	8.475	9.012	8.275	9.3	8.825	7.925	51.812
84	Wajdi Bouallègue (TUN)	8.825	8.5	8.437	9.412	8.35	8.225	51.749
85	Raouf Abdelkarim (EGY)	8.262	7.45	9.287	9.762	8.862	8.125	51.748
86	Zoltan Detroi (HUN)	8.987	8.075	8.375	8.825	8.8	8.675	51.737
87	Joshua Jefferis (AUS)	8.325	8.05	9.012	9	9.15	8.162	51.699
88	Ryan Bradley (GBR)	8.862	7.925	8.612	9.062	8.725	8.475	51.661
89	Leonidas Tzavaras (GRE)	8.15	8.65	8.45	8.95	8.775	8.662	51.637
90	Michael Hjorth (SWE)	8.025	8.6	8.325	9.2	9.175	8.3	51.625
91	Anders Pettersson (SWE)	8.575	9.087	8.45	9.2	8.387	7.85	51.549
92	Thomas Zimmermann (AUT)	8.112	7.925	8.925	9.55	8.762	8.15	51.424
93	Jimmy Bostrom (SWE)	8.287	8.85	7.825	9.4	8.875	8.15	51.387
94	Günther Couckhuyt (BEL)	8.225	9.325	7.75	9.262	8.475	8.35	51.387
95	Riku Koivunen (FIN)	8.35	9.2	7.937	8.912	8.45	8.5	51.349
96	Sid Ali Ferdjani (ALG)	8.425	9.25	8.95	8.737	7.775	8.2	51.337
97	Fateh Ait Saada (ALG)	8.575	8.225	9.512	8.537	8.562	7.925	51.336
98	Roman Schweizer (SUI)	7.75	6.15	9.25	9.6	9.287	9.262	51.299
99	Sami Aalto (FIN)	8.075	8.475	8.7	9.012	8.675	8.325	51.262
100	Harutyum Merdinyan (ARM)	8.5	8.875	8.475	8.737	8.35	8.325	51.262
101	Ümit Şamiloğlu (TUR)	8.625	7.7	8.3	9.562	8.537	8.537	51.261
102	Sascha Palgen (LUX)	7.937	8.65	8.375	9.4	8.375	8.512	51.249
103	Irodotos Georgallas (CYP)	8.1	8	9.625	9.55	8.487	7.462	51.224
104	Julio García (MEX)	9.187	7.95	8.662	9.387	8.437	7.525	51.148
105	Daniel Aunvig (DEN)	8.6	8.35	8.037	9.262	8.5	8.225	50.974
106	Joao Viana (POR)	8.137	8.425	8.95	8.975	8.35	8.125	50.962
107	Jiri Firt (CZE)	7.3	8.425	8.125	9.025	8.837	9.237	50.949
108	Eric Ariel Pedercini (ARG)	8.712	7.55	8.475	9.35	8.45	8.375	50.912
109	Yik-Siang Loke (MAS)	7.8	8.275	8.775	9.4	8.25	8.362	50.862
110	Marco Baldauf (AUT)	8.425	8.125	8.362	8.925	8.7	8.325	50.862
111	Huang Yi-Hsueh (TPE)	8.275	8.55	9.05	8.875	8.125	7.95	50.825
112	Michel Brito Ferrer (CUB)	7.575	7.225	9.412	9.325	9.162	8.125	50.824
113	Epke Zonderland (NED)	8.575	7.875	8.15	9	8.4	8.787	50.787
114	Martin Vlk (CZE)	8.825	8.05	8.5	9.325	8.25	7.825	50.775
115	Rasmus Brandtoft (DEN)	8.387	7.575	8.387	8.962	8	9.375	50.686
116	Artyom Avetyan (ARM)	7.5	8.6	8.4	9.062	8.975	8.125	50.662
117	Wei Siang Ooi (MAS)	8.3	7.7	8.575	9.262	7.725	8.9	50.462
118	Noureddine Yahouia (ALG)	8.35	7.95	8.55	8.712	8.65	8.237	50.449
119	Tommy Ramos (PUR)	7.637	8.075	8.162	8.55	8.775	9.237	50.436
120	Walid Eldariny (EGY)	7.875	7.387	9.612	8.925	8.962	7.6	50.361
121	Herre Zonderland (NED)	8.425	7.425	8.325	9.425	8.4	8.225	50.225
122	Francisco Coutinho (POR)	8.537	7.425	8.7	9.075	8.15	8.325	50.212
123	Andreas Kousiou (CYP)	7.525	7.4	9.3	9.187	8.625	8.137	50.174
124	Vikas Pandey (IND)	7.85	9.15	8.05	8.912	8.4	7.8	50.162
125	Jacob Mostert (NAM)	8.225	8.25	8.425	8.85	8.225	8.125	50.1
126	Pedro Almeida (POR)	8.512	7.3	8.262	8.975	8.6	8.375	50.024
127	Noam Shaham (ISR)	8.387	6.75	8.5	9.275	8.5	8.575	49.987
128	Villekjaer Nielsen (DEN)	7.862	8	8.35	9.1	8.65	8	49.962
129	Tomás González (CHI)	9.312	6.975	8.437	9.337	8.6	7.175	49.836
130	Karim Abdelrahman (EGY)	7.887	8.05	8.187	9.35	8.025	8.175	49.674
131	Marco Mayr (AUT)	8.262	7.85	7.75	9.412	8.275	8.1	49.649
132	Roman Kulesza (POL)	6.825	7.975	8.387	9.187	9.137	8.1	49.611
133	Gerhard Swiegers (RSA)	7.987	8.025	8.325	8.95	8.275	8	49.562
134	Bjorn Slanvall (SWE)	8.35	7.925	8.5	8.362	7.825	8.562	49.524
135	Jerker Taudien (SWE)	8.375	8.675	7.425	8.8	8.325	7.8	49.4
136	Espen Jansen (NOR)	8.2	7.8	8.35	8.325	8.15	8.562	49.387
137	Santiago López (MEX)	8.662	7.562	8.087	8.975	7.825	8.237	49.348
138	Alexander Khamudis (ISR)	8.525	7.325	8.1	8.55	8.15	8.662	49.312
139	Tiago Camacho (POR)	8.137	8.425	8.187	8.525	8.225	7.762	49.261
140	Tue Lodahl (DEN)	8.825	7.5	7.95	8.55	8.2	8.137	49.162
141	Suat Celen (TUR)	8.5	7.025	8.337	9	9.375	6.85	49.087
142	Fernando Fuentes (VEN)	7.925	8.5	7.987	9.362	7.4	7.675	48.849
143	Martin Guido Passalenti (ARG)	8.35	7.15	8.5	8.912	7.825	7.95	48.687
145	Arthur Charchyan (ARM)	8.35	8.575	8.512	8.437	8.325	6.4	48.599
145	Tomislav Markovic (CRO)	7.812	7.325	8.087	8.725	8.1	8.45	48.499
146	Constantinos Aristotelous (CYP)	8.15	5.875	8.287	9.025	8.412	8.737	48.486
147	Salvador Valle (MEX)	8.575	6.1	8.05	9.025	8.2	8.525	48.475
148	James Brochero (COL)	8.3	8.05	7.825	9.125	7.65	7.05	48
149	Joseph Rodriguez (PUR)	7.037	7.3	8.525	8.35	8.375	8.3	47.887
150	Li Xiaopeng (CHN)	9.487	-	9.262	9.75	9.725	9.65	47.874
151	Brett McClure (USA)	9.437	9.562	-	9.662	9.575	9.625	47.861
152	Dewald Laubscher (RSA)	7.887	8	8.175	8.65	7.45	7.675	47.837
153	Adam Botha (RSA)	8.237	7.062	8.3	8.375	8.4	7.225	47.599
154	Ivan Ivankov (BLR)	-	9.637	9.637	9.5	9.112	9.675	47.561
155	Alen Dimic (SLO)	7.95	6.7	7.55	8.9	8.025	8.275	47.4
156	Georgios Georgiou (CYP)	8.1	6.85	8.45	8.875	7.275	7.575	47.125
157	Arno Gasteiger (AUT)	7.675	7.275	7.925	8.512	8	7.7	47.087
158	Bayram Haluk Coskun (TUR)	8.05	6.525	7.35	9.4	8.25	7.375	46.95
159	Akihiro Kasamatsu (JPN)	9.012	9.45	-	9.325	9.525	9.487	46.799
160	Cho Seong-min (KOR)	-	9.275	9.625	9.762	9.7	8.425	46.787
161	Felipe Pina (CHI)	7.85	6.65	7.837	8.837	7.325	8.187	46.686
162	Dyri Kristjansson (ISL)	7.712	6.7	7.25	8.5	8.175	8.15	46.487
163	Anton Golotsutskov (RUS)	9.325	8.525	9.5	9.675	9.437	-	46.462
164	Arve Joergensen (NOR)	8.012	6.925	8.225	8.912	7.4	6.775	46.249
165	Jo Jong-Chol (PRK)	9.262	8.85	9.337	9.387	9.237	-	46.073
166	Mattie de Koning (NED)	7.825	6.375	8.062	8.925	8.162	6.637	45.986
167	Cesar Fuenzalida (CHI)	7.975	5.625	8.025	9.125	8.025	7.125	45.9
168	Andraz Lamut (SLO)	7.85	7.4	6.25	8.45	8.1	7.85	45.9
169	Lee Sun-Sung (KOR)	8.75	9.35	-	9.387	8.925	9.425	45.837
170	Nikolai Kryukov (RUS)	-	9.7	8.387	9.362	8.862	9.525	45.836
171	Morgan Hamm (USA)	8.662	8.8	9.4	9.687	-	9.212	45.761
172	Michel Conceicao (BRA)	9.075	-	9.55	9.45	8.65	8.962	45.687
173	Igor Cassina (ITA)	-	9.075	9.025	9.225	8.637	9.687	45.649
174	Dae Eun Kim (KOR)	8.575	-	9.6	9.362	9.025	8.95	45.512
175	Pierre-Yves Beny (FRA)	8.737	9.312	9.687	9.025	8.75	-	45.511
176	Juan Pablo Reyes Gil (GUA)	7.775	6.5	8.25	8.762	7.1	6.825	45.212
177	Jong Kwang-Yop (PRK)	-	8.787	9.375	9.187	9.375	8.475	45.199
178	Xing Aowei (CHN)	8.65	9.562	8.55	-	9.1	9.312	45.174
179	Alejandro Barrenechea (ESP)	9.3	-	8.825	9.125	8.937	8.962	45.149
180	Stephan Zapf (GER)	8.1	9.35	9.625	9.3	-	8.725	45.1
181	Ken Ikeda (CAN)	8.462	9.412	-	9.4	9.012	8.787	45.073
182	Grant Golding (CAN)	9.325	7.675	9.575	9.4	8.987	-	44.962
183	Andrei Lipski (BUL)	9.025	8.625	-	9.187	9.187	8.75	44.774
184	Bonnie Brydon Sy (PHI)	6.825	6	7.85	8.35	7.85	7.875	44.75
185	Roel Ramirez (PHI)	6.775	7.475	5.6	9.287	7.625	7.925	44.687
186	Attila Lorik (HUN)	-	8.912	8.625	8.987	9.287	8.825	44.636
187	Ivan Gorbunovs (LAT)	9.125	8.95	8.662	9.262	8.637	-	44.636
188	Dimitri Savitski (BLR)	8.075	8.725	9.3	9.337	-	9.175	44.612
189	Andrea Coppolino (ITA)	8.925	8.65	9.75	8.712	8.437	-	44.474
190	Andreu Vivó (ESP)	0	8.325	8.937	8.975	9.562	8.675	44.474
191	Konstantinos Barmpakis (GRE)	8.35	-	8.45	9.587	9.1	8.975	44.462
192	Kim Hyon-Il (PRK)	-	8.55	9.562	9.387	9.05	7.9	44.449
193	Mynor Antonio Juarez Morataya (GUA)	6.2	7.575	7.525	9.287	7	6.825	44.412
194	Levente Fekete (HUN)	8.037	9.275	9.537	-	8.775	8.6	44.224
195	Ernes Suljic (SLO)	7.837	5.375	6.125	9	8.025	7.775	44.137
196	Diego Hypólito (BRA)	9.55	8.2	8.325	9.662	8.375	-	44.112
197	Deivy Castellanos (COL)	7.7	6.05	6.225	8.55	7.925	7.45	43.9
198	Ri Myong-Chol (PRK)	8.75	8.8	8.012	9.35	-	8.887	43.799
199	Andres Saavedra (ECU)	6.45	4.65	7.937	9.075	8	7.5	43.612
200	Ian Bartlett (AUS)	8.162	7.85	-	9.275	8.875	9.412	43.574
201	Andrei Neczli (SVK)	8.4	-	8.887	8.9	9.125	8.037	43.349
202	Filip Yanev (BUL)	8.112	-	8.237	9.45	8.425	9.012	43.236
203	Vasileios Tsolakidis (GRE)	8.187	7.5	8.725	9.462	9.25	-	43.124
204	Shiva Kumar B. N. (IND)	6.475	6.975	7.125	8.35	7.3	6.8	43.025
205	Przemyslaw Lis (POL)	8.537	-	8.262	9.037	8.35	8.65	42.836
206	Eranda Nadeera (SRI)	7.65	6.05	5.5	8.15	7.875	7.55	42.775
207	Johnny Parra (VEN)	7.55	8.75	-	9.012	8.175	9.15	42.637
208	Mohamed Serour (EGY)	8.462	-	7.975	9.4	8.5	8.262	42.599
209	Eranga Asela (SRI)	8.012	6.5	5.975	8.912	6.425	6.625	42.449
210	Julian Witboot (RSA)	7.987	-	8.2	9.462	8.125	8.212	41.986
211	Huang Che-Kuei (TPE)	7.925	8.7	-	8.912	7.925	8.5	41.962
212	Daniel Rexa (CZE)	7.525	8.675	-	9.1	7.85	8.8	41.95
213	Shachar Tal (ISR)	8.025	-	8.6	8.962	8.212	7.987	41.786
214	Jeroen Hardon (NED)	8.175	7.45	-	9.275	8.425	8.425	41.75
215	Tamer Ragab (EGY)	8	7.612	-	8.912	8.325	8.65	41.499
216	Jonas Valgeirsson (ISL)	7.487	4.45	6.537	8.5	7.525	6.825	41.324
217	Pavol Mikus (SVK)	7.2	8.187	-	9.262	8.525	8.012	41.186
218	Cumhur Zorba (TUR)	7.675	7.75	8.1	9.212	-	7.7	40.437
219	Ibrahim Bulut (TUR)	7.912	7.55	-	9.337	8.125	7.425	40.349
220	Marko Brez (CRO)	8.175	-	7.687	8.962	7.925	7.55	40.299
221	Sameera Ekanayake (SRI)	6.912	5.3	6.2	8.575	6.5	6.125	39.612
222	Oscar Anibal Canas Figueroa (ESA)	6.8	6.425	5.125	8.412	6.55	6.025	39.337
223	Wiraj Asanga (SRI)	7.6	4.625	4.85	8.462	7.55	6.125	39.212
224	Karim Guezgouz (ALG)	7.025	7.55	7.95	-	8.15	8.15	38.825
225	Alexei Nemov (RUS)	9.537	-	-	9.487	9.687	9.775	38.486
226	Arthur Zakaryan (ARM)	6.575	-	7.6	8.775	7.85	7.65	38.45
227	Huang Xu (CHN)	-	9.437	9.625	-	9.637	9.562	38.261
228	Kyle Shewfelt (CAN)	9.687	-	8.4	9.762	-	9.287	37.136
229	You Won-Kil (KOR)	8.662	9.05	9.675	9.7	-	-	37.087
230	Abel Driggs Santos (CUB)	-	8.725	9.487	9.625	9.225	-	37.062
231	Xiao Qin (CHN)	8.612	9.812	-	8.962	9.55	-	36.936
232	Alberto Busnari (ITA)	8.55	9.337	-	-	9.337	9.575	36.799
233	Yu Shi Sato (JPN)	-	9.275	9.537	-	8.775	9.125	36.712
234	Yu Hung-Pin (TPE)	-	9.112	9.437	-	8.925	9.025	36.499
235	Cédric Guille (FRA)	8.487	-	8.912	9.275	-	9.637	36.311
236	Fabian Hambuechen (GER)	9.037	-	-	9.337	9.437	8.45	36.261
237	Shin Hyung-Ook (KOR)	9.087	9.075	-	-	8.7	9.325	36.187
238	Oriol Combarros (ESP)	8.712	8.35	9.4	9.375	-	-	35.837
239	David Eaton (GBR)	-	8.887	-	8.987	8.675	9.287	35.836
240	Dimitar Dimitrov (BUL)	8.95	8.925	8.675	9.15	-	-	35.7
241	Vitali Shnikers (LAT)	8.437	9.262	-	-	9.037	8.962	35.698
242	Vitor Camargo (BRA)	-	8.5	9.175	9.375	-	8.512	35.562
243	Matteo Angioletti (ITA)	8.662	-	9.637	9.375	-	7.725	35.399
244	Dimosthenis Tampakos (GRE)	-	8.2	9.725	-	9.012	8.137	35.074
245	Mark Freeman (GBR)	8.4	-	9.6	-	8.4	8.662	35.062
246	Arpad Takacs (HUN)	8.15	7.95	-	9.325	9.225	-	34.65
247	Joël Moss (AUS)	9.012	-	8.65	-	7.95	9.037	34.649
248	Richard Ikeda (CAN)	-	8.862	8.712	-	8.725	8.35	34.649
249	Kamil Hulboj (POL)	-	8.512	8.275	-	8.75	9.05	34.587
250	Roland Kiraly (HUN)	7.95	-	9.412	9.387	-	7.787	34.536
251	Kim Jong-Ryong (PRK)	7.75	8.975	-	-	8.362	9.175	34.262
252	Alexander Rodríguez (PUR)	8.387	8.962	-	9.45	-	7.35	34.149
253	Petja Mikkonen (FIN)	8.412	-	9	8.962	7.625	-	33.999
254	Mutapha Khiati (ALG)	8.2	8.675	-	8.7	8.125	-	33.7
255	Victor Rosa (BRA)	8.625	8.175	-	-	7.95	8.912	33.662
256	Marcin Lominski (POL)	8.137	-	8.987	-	8.05	8.475	33.649
257	Shu Mun Ng (MAS)	8.437	-	-	8.9	7.975	8.25	33.562
258	Mario Gorosito (ARG)	8.387	-	8.162	8.987	-	7.95	33.486
259	Kwang Tung Onn (MAS)	-	8.775	6.975	8.9	-	8.7	33.35
260	Kris Marcek (CRO)	-	9.3	7.85	-	8	8.162	33.312
261	Lucas Matias Chiarlo (ARG)	-	7.275	-	8.925	8.525	8.55	33.275
262	Robert Seligman (CRO)	8.25	8.975	7.1	8.75	-	-	33.075
263	Sasa Solar (CRO)	-	7.875	-	8.45	8.4	8.325	33.05
264	Wah Mai Heng (MAS)	7.95	7.65	9.437	-	7.875	-	32.912
265	Petr Smejkal (CZE)	-	7.95	8.475	-	7.825	8.525	32.775
266	Manuel Salazar (MEX)	-	7.825	8.662	-	7.875	8.35	32.712
267	Sébastien Boesch (AUT)	7.65	-	7.85	8.75	-	8.287	32.537
268	Ioannis Melissanidis (GRE)	7.812	6.9	-	9.237	-	8.55	32.499
269	Troy Sender (RSA)	7.687	7.862	-	8.962	7.475	-	31.986
270	Sergio Erasmo Erbojo (ARG)	7.85	7.55	7.85	-	8.125	-	31.375
271	Edison Carvajal (COL)	7.625	5.6	7.675	8.762	0	0	29.662
272	Gretar Sigthorsson (ISL)	7.687	-	6.4	8.787	6.725	-	29.599
273	Marius Daniel Urzica (ROM)	-	9.775	-	-	9.25	9.4	28.425
274	Gunnar Sigurdsson (ISL)	7.25	5.2	-	8.475	7.475	-	28.4
275	Eric Casimir (FRA)	-	9.7	-	-	9.162	9.425	28.287
276	Thomas Andergassen (GER)	-	9.462	9.45	-	9.312	-	28.224
277	Sergei Vialtsev (UKR)	8.95	-	9.625	9.55	-	-	28.125
278	Tatsuya Yamada (JPN)	8.912	-	9.7	9.512	-	-	28.124
279	Teng Haibin (CHN)	-	9.662	-	-	8.562	9.637	27.861
280	Jesus Carballo (ESP)	-	9.05	-	-	9.175	9.587	27.812
281	Christoph Schaerer (SUI)	-	9.5	-	-	8.862	9.45	27.812
282	Valeri Goncharov (UKR)	-	8.712	-	-	9.512	9.55	27.774
283	Pavel Mamin (AUS)	-	8.8	9.6	9.362	-	-	27.762
284	Roddman Waldemar Morga Chopen (GUA)	6.525	-	7.225	8.475	-	5.275	27.5
285	David Vyoral (CZE)	9.287	-	8.675	9.312	-	-	27.274
286	Lai Kuo-Cheng (TPE)	8.4	-	9.512	9.337	-	-	27.249
287	Darren Gerrard (GBR)	8.637	-	8.925	9.412	-	-	26.974
288	Regulo Carmona (VEN)	7.75	-	9.612	9.312	-	-	26.674
289	Kevin Bachmann (SUI)	8.3	-	9.4	8.925	-	-	26.625
290	Denis Zbickis (LAT)	-	-	8.85	8.9	-	8.65	26.4
291	Jari Monkkonen (FIN)	-	8.4	-	-	8.125	9.562	26.087
292	Dimitri Kasparovich (BLR)	7.95	-	-	-	9.312	8.812	26.074
293	Ioan Constantin Covaci (ROM)	7.225	-	9.362	9.412	-	-	25.999
294	Sain Autalibov (KAZ)	8.175	-	8.475	9.112	-	-	25.762
295	Ruslan Sugraliyev (KAZ)	-	8.7	-	-	8.225	8.712	25.637
296	Kiril Gizdov (BUL)	-	8.325	8.987	-	8.2	-	25.512
297	Kasper Fardan (DEN)	8.4	-	-	9.312	-	7.625	25.337
298	Olli Torkkel (FIN)	0	8.575	9.037	0	-	7.45	25.062
299	Abdel Kader Guettaf (ALG)	-	-	8.075	8.862	-	7.8	24.737
300	Sašo Bertoncelj (SLO)	6.8	8.725	-	8.737	-	-	24.262
301	Miroslaw Niepielski (POL)	8.712	6.425	-	8.475	-	-	23.612
302	Cory Greenidge (BAR)	7.825	-	-	9.475	6.025	-	23.325
303	Harry Abrahams (RSA)	-	6.75	8.212	-	-	8.087	23.049
304	Henrik Kraemmer (DEN)	-	7.475	7.1	-	8.075	-	22.65
305	Raj Bhavsar (USA)	-	-	9.675	-	9.5	-	19.175
306	Alexei Sinkevich (BLR)	-	9.35	-	-	9.012	-	18.362
307	Juan Colon (PUR)	-	-	9.425	-	8.237	-	17.662
308	Mitja Petkovšek (SLO)	-	-	7.65	-	9.65	-	17.3
309	Bahadir Altay (TUR)	-	-	8.475	-	8.8	-	17.275
310	Diego Mercado (MEX)	8.45	-	-	8.775	-	-	17.225
311	Stanislav Micheller (SVK)	-	8.15	8.312	-	-	-	16.462
312	Yorlany Mendoza Vicet (CUB)	9.2	-	-	-	-	6.7	15.9
313	Morad Zaki (EGY)	-	7.675	8.1	-	-	-	15.775
314	Jorge Alberto Pedraza Anez (BOL)	6.837	-	-	8.8	-	-	15.637
315	Anton Heidar Thorolfsson (ISL)	-	5.3	-	-	-	7.387	12.687
316	Yuri van Gelder (NED)	-	-	9.675	-	-	-	9.675
317	Alexander Tvauri (GEO)	-	-	9.637	-	-	-	9.637
318	David Pacheco (VEN)	-	-	9.525	-	-	-	9.525
319	Aljaž Pegan (SLO)	-	-	-	-	-	9.5	9.5
320	Mario Rauscher (AUT)	-	7.225	-	-	-	-	7.225
321	Troy Maillis (BAH)	7.087	-		-	-	-	7.087
322	Evgueni Krylov (RUS)	1	-	-	-	-	-	1
323	Emilio Cubillos (CHI)	-	-	-	-	-	0	0
323	Kristian Solem (NOR)	-	-	-	-	0	-	0
323	Daniel Good (NZL)	-	-	-	-	-	0	0

=== Team ===
Rank	Team	Floor (gymnastics)	Pommel horse	Rings (gymnastics)	Vault (gymnastics)	Parallel bars	Horizontal bar	Total
1st place, gold medalist(s)	China	28.162	28.649	28.824	28.762	28.712	28.887	171.996
1st place, gold medalist(s)	Li Xiaopeng	9.200	-	9.600	9.762	9.762	-	171.996
1st place, gold medalist(s)	Xing Aowei	9.312	9.700	-	9.250	-	9.525	171.996
1st place, gold medalist(s)	Teng Haibin	-	9.712	-	-	9.525	9.725	171.996
1st place, gold medalist(s)	Yang Wei	9.650	-	9.562	9.750	-	-	171.996
1st place, gold medalist(s)	Huang Xu	-	-	9.662	-	9.425	9.637	171.996
1st place, gold medalist(s)	Xiao Qin	-	9.237	-	-	-	-	171.996
2nd place, silver medalist(s)	United States	28.275	28.099	29.061	28.199	28.700	28.787	171.121
2nd place, silver medalist(s)	Paul Hamm	9.675	9.500	-	9.562	9.425	9.475	171.121
2nd place, silver medalist(s)	Blaine Wilson	-	-	9.737	-	9.550	9.787	171.121
2nd place, silver medalist(s)	Jason Gatson	8.975	-	9.712	-	9.725	-	171.121
2nd place, silver medalist(s)	Morgan Hamm	9.625	9.487	-	9.112	-	-	171.121
2nd place, silver medalist(s)	Brett McClure	-	9.112	-	9.525	-	9.525	171.121
2nd place, silver medalist(s)	Raj Bhavsar	-	-	9.612	-	-	-	171.121
3rd place, bronze medalist(s)	Japan	27.562	28.499	28.799	28.412	28.700	28.736	170.708
3rd place, bronze medalist(s)	Naoya Tsukahara	9.250	9.487	9.537	9.425	9.800	9.362	170.708
3rd place, bronze medalist(s)	Hiroyuki Tomita	9.187	9.375	9.650	9.550	9.175	9.662	170.708
3rd place, bronze medalist(s)	Takehiro Kashima	9.125	9.637	-	-	9.725	9.712	170.708
3rd place, bronze medalist(s)	Tatsuya Yamada	-	-	9.612	9.437	-	-	170.708
4	Russia	27.699	28.374	27.575	28.062	28.699	28.362	168.771
4	Alexei Bondarenko	9.350	-	9.350	9.575	9.637	9.425	168.771
4	Alexei Nemov	9.212	-	-	9.512	9.787	9.712	168.771
4	Anton Golotsutskov	9.137	9.237	9.500	8.975	-	-	168.771
4	Evgeny Podgorny	-	9.462	8.725	-	9.275	-	168.771
4	Nikolai Kryukov	-	9.675	-	-	-	9.225	168.771
5	Romania	26.887	28.449	28.812	27.787	27.412	28.562	167.909
5	Marian Drăgulescu	8.625	-	9.600	9.200	9.200	9.437	167.909
5	Razvan Selariu	9.287	-	9.562	9.050	-	9.500	167.909
5	Marius Urzică	-	9.437	-	-	9.612	9.625	167.909
5	Ioan Suciu	8.975	9.662	-	9.537	-	-	167.909
5	Dan Potra	-	9.350	9.650	-	8.600	-	167.909
6	South Korea	27.575	27.499	28.899	27.487	27.249	27.574	166.283
6	Yang Tae-Young	9.450	9.087	9.687	9.625	9.400	9.162	166.283
6	Cho Seong-Min	-	-	9.562	9.162	9.137	8.925	166.283
6	You Won-Kil	9.025	-	9.650	8.700	-	-	166.283
6	Lee Sun-Sung	-	9.337	-	-	-	9.487	166.283
6	Kim Dae-Eun	9.100	-	-	-	8.712	-	166.283
6	Shin Hyung-Ok	-	9.075	-	-	-	-	166.283
7	France	27.787	27.524	28.199	27.487	28.137	26.412	165.546
7	Dmitri Karbanenko	9.400	-	9.212	9.525	9.287	8.362	165.546
7	Johan Mounard	9.125	9.337	-	8.750	9.500	-	165.546
7	Eric Casimir	-	9.575	-	-	9.350	9.325	165.546
7	Cedric Guille	9.262	-	-	9.212	-	8.725	165.546
7	Pierre-Yves Bény	-	8.612	9.650	-	-	-	165.546
7	Florent Marée	-	-	9.337	-	-	-	165.546
8	Ukraine	26.562	27.636	29.049	27.325	27.474	27.062	165.108
8	Ruslan Mezentsev	-	9.437	9.700	9.425	9.037	-	165.108
8	Roman Zozulya	9.262	-	9.687	8.925	9.600	-	165.108
8	Alexander Svetlichnyi	9.225	9.562	-	8.975	-	8.950	165.108
8	Alexander Beresch	8.075	8.637	-	-	-	8.550	165.108
8	Valery Goncharov	-	-	-	-	8.837	9.562	165.108
8	Sergei Vyaltsev	-	-	9.662	-	-	-	165.108

=== All-around ===
Rank	Gymnast	Floor (gymnastics)	Pommel horse	Rings (gymnastics)	Vault (gymnastics)	Parallel bars	Horizontal bar	Total
1st place, gold medalist(s)	Paul Hamm (USA)	9.625	9.700	9.475	9.537	9.662	9.775	57.774
2nd place, silver medalist(s)	Yang Wei (CHN)	9.662	9.587	9.625	9.637	9.587	9.612	57.710
3rd place, bronze medalist(s)	Hiroyuki Tomita (JPN)	9.200	9.737	9.662	9.462	9.687	9.687	57.435
4	Yernar Yerimbetov (KAZ)	9.450	9.662	9.450	9.550	9.612	9.562	57.286
5	Eric Lopez Rios (CUB)	9.012	9.650	9.637	9.500	9.600	9.212	56.611
6	Marian Drăgulescu (ROU)	9.550	8.787	9.550	9.850	9.350	9.487	56.574
7	Naoya Tsukahara (JPN)	9.425	9.675	9.550	9.437	9.687	8.612	56.386
8	Jason Gatson (USA)	9.450	8.862	9.675	9.237	9.562	9.562	56.348
9	Roman Zozulya (UKR)	9.025	9.375	9.637	8.975	9.587	9.562	56.161
10	Ruslan Mezentsev (UKR)	9.400	9.400	9.550	9.425	8.837	9.112	55.724
11	Alexei Bondarenko (RUS)	9.200	9.412	9.325	9.550	9.412	8.700	55.599
12	Yang Tae-Young (KOR)	9.087	9.337	9.625	9.025	9.537	8.912	55.523
13	Sven Kwiatkowski (GER)	9.212	9.375	8.775	9.387	9.225	9.512	55.486
14	Denis Savenkov (BLR)	9.537	8.987	9.025	9.400	9.400	9.125	55.474
15	Andreas Schweizer (SUI)	8.562	9.337	9.612	9.337	9.262	9.250	55.360
16	Víctor Cano (ESP)	9.250	9.625	9.412	9.175	8.837	9.037	55.336
17	Pavel Gofman (ISR)	9.237	8.512	9.425	9.312	9.450	9.225	55.161
18	Dmitri Karbonenko (FRA)	9.225	8.775	9.112	9.087	9.325	9.500	55.024
19	Rafael Martínez (ESP)	9.387	8.875	9.075	9.300	9.262	9.112	55.011
20	David Kikuchi (CAN)	8.525	9.425	9.350	9.112	8.950	9.062	54.424
21	Razvan Selariu (ROU)	9.137	7.737	9.537	9.600	8.200	9.500	53.711
22	Alexander Jeltkov (CAN)	9.262	8.625	8.512	9.312	7.950	8.637	52.298
23	Yordan Yovchev (BUL)	-	9.162	9.725	9.400	8.725	5.425	42.437
24	Evgeny Podgorny (RUS)	-	-	8.987	9.287	9.437	7.500	35.211

=== Floor exercise ===
Rank	Gymnast	Total
1st place, gold medalist(s)	Paul Hamm (USA)	9.762
1st place, gold medalist(s)	Yordan Yovchev (BUL)	9.762
3rd place, bronze medalist(s)	Kyle Shewfelt (CAN)	9.737
4	Diego Hypólito (BRA)	9.662
4	Marian Drăgulescu (ROU)	9.662
6	Igors Vihrovs (LAT)	9.612
7	Róbert Gál (HUN)	9.487
8	Ng Shu Wai (MAS)	9.475

=== Pommel horse ===
Rank	Gymnast	Total
1st place, gold medalist(s)	Teng Haibin (CHN)	9.762
1st place, gold medalist(s)	Takehiro Kashima (JPN)	9.762
3rd place, bronze medalist(s)	Nikolai Kryukov (RUS)	9.725
4	Ioan Suciu (ROU)	9.712
5	Marius Urzică (ROU)	9.650
6	Ivan Ivankov (BLR)	9.575
7	Xiao Qin (CHN)	9.350
8	Eric Casimir (FRA)	9.150

=== Rings ===
Rank	Gymnast	Total
1st place, gold medalist(s)	Yordan Yovchev (BUL)	9.787
1st place, gold medalist(s)	Demosthenes Tampakos (GRE)	9.787
3rd place, bronze medalist(s)	Matteo Morandi (ITA)	9.700
3rd place, bronze medalist(s)	Andrea Coppolino (ITA)	9.700
5	Tatsuya Yamada (JPN)	9.687
6	Blaine Wilson (USA)	9.675
7	Jason Gatson (USA)	9.662
8	Pierre-Yves Bény (FRA)	9.600

=== Vault ===
Rank	Gymnast	Vault 1	Vault 2	Total
1st place, gold medalist(s)	Li Xiaopeng (CHN)	9.775	9.862	9.818
2nd place, silver medalist(s)	Marian Drăgulescu (ROU)	9.775	9.600	9.687
3rd place, bronze medalist(s)	Kyle Shewfelt (CAN)	9.650	9.575	9.612
4	Abel Driggs Santos (CUB)	9.550	9.525	9.537
4	Róbert Gál (HUN)	9.550	9.525	9.537
6	Ioan Suciu (ROU)	9.700	9.187	9.443
7	Diego Hypólito (BRA)	9.575	9.200	9.387
8	Anton Golotsutskov (RUS)	9.000	9.300	9.150

=== Parallel bars ===
Rank	Gymnast	Total
1st place, gold medalist(s)	Li Xiaopeng (CHN)	9.825
2nd place, silver medalist(s)	Huang Xu (CHN)	9.762
2nd place, silver medalist(s)	Alexei Nemov (RUS)	9.762
4	Naoya Tsukahara (JPN)	9.675
4	Cho Seong-Min (KOR)	9.637
6	Blaine Wilson (USA)	9.625
7	Eric López Ríos (CUB)	9.575
8	Mitja Petkovšek (SLO)	9.562

=== Horizontal bar ===
Rank	Gymnast	Total
1st place, gold medalist(s)	Takehiro Kashima (JPN)	9.775
2nd place, silver medalist(s)	Igor Cassina (ITA)	9.750
3rd place, bronze medalist(s)	Alexei Nemov (RUS)	9.737
4	Philippe Rizzo (AUS)	9.700
5	Li Xiaopeng (CHN)	9.662
6	Alexander Jeltkov (CAN)	9.187
7	Ivan Ivankov (BLR)	8.762
8	Florent Marée (FRA)	8.600

== Women ==
=== Qualification ===
Rank	Team	Vault (gymnastics)	Uneven bars	Balance beam	Floor (gymnastics)	Total
1	Elena Gómez (ESP)	9.25	9.4	9.362	9.537	37.549
2	Chellsie Memmel (USA)	9.212	9.575	9.412	9.25	37.449
3	Svetlana Khorkina (RUS)	9.225	9.45	9.262	9.312	37.249
4	Irina Yarotska (UKR)	9.075	9.525	9.35	9.112	37.062
5	Fan Ye (CHN)	8.837	9.612	9.712	8.662	36.823
6	Anna Pavlova (RUS)	9.425	8.712	9.325	9.35	36.812
7	Carly Patterson (USA)	9.325	9.487	8.7	9.262	36.774
8	Alina Kozich (UKR)	9.237	8.837	9.337	9.325	36.736
9	Courtney Kupets (USA)	9.3	9.625	9.237	8.462	36.624
10	Allana Slater (AUS)	9.162	8.937	9.125	9.287	36.511
11	Andreea Munteanu (ROM)	9.387	8.512	9.15	9.412	36.461
12	Suzanne Harmes (NED)	9.175	9.075	8.612	9.4	36.262
13	Kylie Stone (CAN)	9.05	8.875	9.1	9.187	36.212
14	Oana Ban (ROM)	9.125	9.25	8.537	9.287	36.199
15	Alexandra Eremia (ROM)	9.175	8.537	9.2	9.25	36.162
16	Oksana Chusovitina (UZB)	9.437	9.137	8.537	9.025	36.136
17	Monette Russo (AUS)	9.05	9.187	9.4	8.475	36.112
18	Daria Bijak (GER)	9.112	8.9	9.012	9.087	36.111
19	Zhang Nan (CHN)	9.225	8.1	9.487	9.287	36.099
20	Elena Zamolodchikova (RUS)	9.525	8.775	8.737	9	36.037
21	Leyanet González (CUB)	9.3	8.625	8.8	9.287	36.012
22	Kang Xin (CHN)	9.087	8.8	9.4	8.562	35.849
23	Camila Comin (BRA)	9.112	8.925	8.725	9.062	35.824
24	Monica Bergamelli (ITA)	9.287	9.1	8.912	8.375	35.674
25	Daniele Hypólito (BRA)	8.987	8.925	8.8	8.95	35.662
26	Émilie Le Pennec (FRA)	8.887	8.825	8.512	9.437	35.661
27	Tasha Schwikert (USA)	9.35	8.912	8.875	8.512	35.649
28	Patricia Moreno (ESP)	9.2	9.087	8.087	9.275	35.649
29	Ayaka Sahara (JPN)	9.075	8.787	8.925	8.825	35.612
30	Aagje Vanwalleghem (BEL)	9.175	9.162	8.65	8.6	35.587
31	Kim Un-jong (PRK)	9.05	9.425	8.225	8.875	35.575
32	Heather Purnell (CAN)	9.225	8.85	8.25	9.112	35.437
33	Rebecca Mason (GBR)	8.85	8.962	9.1	8.487	35.399
34	Evgeniya Kuznetsova (BUL)	9.075	8.962	8.712	8.612	35.361
35	Camille Schmutz (FRA)	8.725	8.787	9.075	8.75	35.337
36	Brenda Magaña (MEX)	9.287	8.65	8.2	9.162	35.299
37	Viktoria Karpenko (BUL)	9.037	8.675	8.587	8.975	35.274
38	Pyon Kwang-sun (PRK)	9.275	9.475	7.912	8.5	35.162
39	Maria Teresa Gargano (ITA)	8.962	8.862	8.662	8.675	35.161
40	Alona Kvasha (UKR)	9.225	8.762	7.7	9.462	35.149
41	Marika Pestrin (ITA)	9.162	9.1	8.35	8.487	35.099
42	Yvonne Musik (GER)	9.05	9.1	8.325	8.6	35.075
43	Lenika de Simone (ESP)	9.037	9.062	8.275	8.625	34.999
44	Manami Ishizaka (JPN)	9.125	8.9	8.275	8.675	34.975
45	Belinda Archer (AUS)	9.2	7.8	8.987	8.987	34.974
46	Amy Dodsley (GBR)	8.85	8.487	8.787	8.85	34.974
47	Elizabeth Line (GBR)	8.987	8.712	8.6	8.65	34.949
48	Cristina Cavalli (ITA)	8.85	8.887	8.475	8.737	34.949
49	Marina Proskurina (UKR)	9.262	9.137	8.087	8.45	34.936
50	Jana Komrsková (CZE)	9.337	8.3	8.587	8.7	34.924
51	Melanie Marti (SUI)	9.112	8.875	8.65	8.287	34.924
52	Lisa Brüggemann (GER)	9.075	8.912	8.712	8.175	34.874
53	Kyoko Oshima (JPN)	8.975	8.175	8.65	8.987	34.787
54	Melanie Banville (CAN)	9.087	9.062	7.775	8.862	34.786
55	Laura Moreno (MEX)	9.212	8.737	8.075	8.7	34.724
56	Mayra Kroonen (NED)	9.075	8.15	8.6	8.887	34.712
57	Stefani Bismpikou (GRE)	8.45	9.05	8.762	8.375	34.637
58	Maria Apostolidi (GRE)	9.025	8.487	8.6	8.45	34.562
59	Marine Debauve (FRA)	8.875	8.7	9.125	7.837	34.537
60	Aleksandra Gordeeva (UZB)	9	8.362	8.412	8.712	34.486
61	Gabriela Leal (MEX)	8.862	8.687	8.475	8.187	34.211
62	Miho Takenaka (JPN)	9.062	8.95	8.237	7.8	34.049
63	Ariella Käslin (SUI)	9.15	8.812	7.837	8.225	34.024
64	Veronica Wagner (SWE)	8.925	7.9	8.712	8.487	34.024
65	Joanna Skowrońska (POL)	9.237	8.637	8.387	7.75	34.011
66	Park Kyung-ah (KOR)	8.787	8.537	8.325	8.362	34.011
67	Danielle Englert (SUI)	9.062	8.7	7.862	8.337	33.961
68	Katja Abel (GER)	9	7.962	8.175	8.762	33.899
69	Maria Mastrogiannopoulou (GRE)	8.787	8.6	8.375	8.062	33.824
70	Jin Dal-lae (KOR)	8.975	8.725	7.712	8.337	33.749
71	Elena Anochina (RUS)	8.55	8.312	8.637	8.212	33.711
72	Kang Ji-na (KOR)	8.625	8.35	8.175	8.512	33.662
73	Lyerida Mogollon (MEX)	9.062	8.412	7.837	8.275	33.586
74	Veronika Adamská (SVK)	8.85	8.637	8.037	8	33.524
75	Ralitsa Rangelova (BUL)	9.075	8.262	7.875	8.137	33.349
76	Kateřina Marešová (CZE)	8.862	8.1	8.237	8.087	33.286
77	Kim Hyo-bin (KOR)	8.95	8.05	7.55	8.725	33.275
78	Zuzana Sekerová (SVK)	9.087	7.537	8.65	8	33.274
79	Berber van den Berg (NED)	9	8.925	6.775	8.562	33.262
80	Krisztina Szarka (HUN)	8.787	8	8.237	8.225	33.249
81	Tünde Pentek (HUN)	8.762	8.687	7.237	8.487	33.173
82	Marta Pihan (POL)	8.85	7.675	8.625	8	33.15
83	Annelore Collaud (SUI)	8.825	8.462	7.575	8.25	33.112
84	Veronika Ožanová (CZE)	8.812	7.35	8.862	8.075	33.099
85	Joanna Litewka (POL)	8.887	8.225	8.137	7.837	33.086
86	Małgorzata Skowrońska (POL)	9.137	8.287	7.512	8.112	33.048
87	Jana Šikulová (CZE)	8.062	8.512	7.987	8.487	33.048
88	Yulia Tarasenka (BLR)	8.875	8.125	8.1	7.837	32.937
89	Celeste Carnevale (ARG)	8.912	8.437	7.987	7.6	32.936
90	Melina Sirolli (ARG)	8.6	8.25	7.85	8.162	32.862
91	Céline Sohet (BEL)	8.087	8.637	8	8.137	32.861
92	Ailish Nolan (NZL)	8.45	8.487	8.087	7.837	32.861
93	Sofia Tsegkeli (GRE)	8.525	8.575	7.4	8.35	32.85
94	Zandre Labuschagne (RSA)	8.962	8.3	8	7.537	32.799
95	Kerry Joyce (RSA)	8.875	8.362	7.837	7.712	32.786
96	Renata Kiss (HUN)	8.812	8.7	7.525	7.725	32.762
97	Gabriela Parigi (ARG)	8.312	8.687	8.212	7.462	32.673
98	Jelena Zanevskaja (LTU)	8.75	7.587	8.287	8.025	32.649
99	Zhi Wei Chang (MAS)	8.637	8.012	8.125	7.775	32.549
100	Jessica López (VEN)	8.412	8.087	8.162	7.85	32.511
101	Carina Hasenöhrl (AUT)	8.912	8.262	8.037	7.2	32.411
102	Irina Sirutz (BLR)	7.925	8.387	8.375	7.65	32.337
103	Joanna Skibko (POL)	8.787	8.462	7.525	7.55	32.324
104	Nurul Fatiha Abd Hamid (MAS)	8.662	8.062	7.437	8.062	32.223
105	Cecília Stancato (ARG)	8.725	7.562	8.225	7.6	32.112
106	Bibiana Vélez (COL)	8.7	8.137	7.25	8	32.087
107	Gabriëlla Wammes (NED)	9.112	7.5	7.537	7.937	32.086
108	Jaana Palmu (FIN)	8.462	8.45	7.662	7.45	32.024
109	Karolina Bohman (SWE)	8.625	7.2	8.312	7.862	31.999
110	Sif Pálsdóttir (ISL)	7.737	7.875	8.225	8.137	31.974
111	Kelly Golding (RSA)	9.05	8.187	6.887	7.837	31.961
112	Tina Erceg (CRO)	8.725	8.05	7.112	8.05	31.937
113	Annukka Almenoksa (FIN)	8.775	7.687	7.762	7.7	31.924
114	Kitti Gál (HUN)	8.987	7.462	7.287	8.162	31.898
115	Leysha López (PUR)	8.787	7.912	7.4	7.7	31.799
116	Jana Luptáková (SVK)	8.262	7.812	7.787	7.912	31.773
117	Sandra Mayer (AUT)	8.7	7.587	7.525	7.9	31.712
118	Julia Kamnar (SLO)	7.862	7.812	7.787	8.187	31.648
119	Velha Tiarentiava (BLR)	8.475	7.625	7.037	8.412	31.549
120	Kate Brocklehurst (NZL)	8.512	8.1	7.037	7.825	31.474
121	Yee Yin Yap (MAS)	8.65	7.287	7.95	7.537	31.424
122	Alethea Boon (NZL)	8.925	7.512	7.3	7.587	31.324
123	Maria Skyttä (FIN)	8.525	7.762	7.162	7.862	31.311
124	Alexandra González (PUR)	8.3	8.1	7.325	7.55	31.275
125	Tanja Gratt (AUT)	8.65	8.012	6.85	7.725	31.237
126	Mira Laitila (FIN)	8.375	7.837	7.2	7.775	31.187
127	Belinda Castles (NZL)	7.825	8.225	7.362	7.775	31.187
128	Martina Castro (CHI)	8.712	7.375	7.075	7.987	31.149
129	Cheronne Beyl (RSA)	8.3	7.9	7.175	7.737	31.112
130	Carolina Alarcón (CHI)	8.437	7.475	7.262	7.937	31.111
131	Miia Hakala (FIN)	8.225	7.687	7.262	7.912	31.086
132	Leidy Blanco (COL)	8.05	8.175	7.137	7.55	30.912
133	Nicola Wells (NZL)	8.55	6.562	7.975	7.737	30.824
134	María Isabel González (GUA)	8.212	7.35	7.45	7.8	30.812
135	Chiang Pi-Hsuan (TPE)	8.375	7.45	7.45	7.525	30.8
136	Mária Homolová (SVK)	8.512	6.85	7.737	7.687	30.786
137	Alina Sycheuskaya (BLR)	7.987	6.887	7.312	8.487	30.673
138	Tanja Jónsdóttir (ISL)	8.325	7.575	7.2	7.5	30.6
139	Ruth Vasta (ARG)	8.162	7.762	6.887	7.712	30.523
140	Elpida Michail (CYP)	8.575	6.65	7.425	7.8	30.45
141	Kristin Gísladóttir (ISL)	8.387	6.65	7.337	7.975	30.349
142	Julia Aigner (AUT)	8.675	6.925	7.425	7.262	30.287
143	María José de la Fuente (BOL)	8.275	7.025	6.85	8.137	30.287
144	María Lozada (PUR)	8.212	7.45	7.112	7.5	30.274
145	Samar Yousry (EGY)	8.075	6.475	8.112	7.612	30.274
146	Inga Ros Gunnarsdóttir (ISL)	7.7	7.575	7.137	7.775	30.187
147	Stefanie Praxmarer (AUT)	7.7	7.275	7.437	7.662	30.074
148	Yekaterina Dmitrieva (KAZ)	8.312	6.237	7.387	7.75	29.686
149	Mery García (PER)	8.725	6.025	7.475	7.375	29.6
150	Wu Ling-Yi (TPE)	8.85	6.85	6.037	7.75	29.487
151	Gabriela Gómez (COL)	8.387	6.987	6.325	7.562	29.261
152	Yasmeen Khair (JOR)	8.075	6.1	7.912	7.05	29.137
153	Cătălina Ponor (ROM)	9.262	-	9.662	9.537	28.461
154	Li Ya (CHN)	8.9	9.45	9.625	-	27.975
155	Florica Leonida (ROM)	-	9.362	9.25	9.312	27.924
156	Kalena Astwood (BER)	7.862	5.375	7.187	7.475	27.899
157	Lin Li (CHN)	-	9.637	8.95	9.2	27.787
158	Daiane dos Santos (BRA)	8.462	9.125	-	9.512	27.099
159	Jacqui Dunn (AUS)	9.062	8.775	9.225	-	27.062
160	Vanessa Hobbs (GBR)	9.075	-	8.825	9.162	27.062
161	Tania Gener (ESP)	9.025	9.4	-	8.587	27.012
162	Ana Paula Rodrigues (BRA)	-	9.325	8.737	8.837	26.899
163	Stephanie Moorhouse (AUS)	-	9.112	9.137	8.637	26.886
164	Loes Linders (NED)	9.087	-	8.775	8.987	26.849
165	Coralie Chacon (FRA)	9.387	-	8.95	8.45	26.787
166	Mónica Mesalles (ESP)	9.137	-	8.587	9.025	26.749
167	Cherrelle Fennell (GBR)	9.225	8.962	-	8.537	26.724
168	Richelle Simpson (CAN)	9.125	-	8.7	8.8	26.625
169	Laís Souza (BRA)	9.412	-	8.3	8.8	26.512
170	Soraya Chaouch (FRA)	-	8.45	9.037	8.975	26.462
171	Ilaria Colombo (ITA)	8.787	8.812	8.725	-	26.324
172	Kang Yun-mi (PRK)	9.6	7.812	-	8.85	26.262
173	Caroline Molinari (BRA)	8.925	9.212	8.087	-	26.224
174	Evgenia Zafeiraki (GRE)	9.062	8.875	-	8.275	26.212
175	So Jong-ok (PRK)	-	9.262	7.95	8.662	25.874
176	Ri Hae-yon (PRK)	9.262	-	8.675	7.862	25.799
177	Han Jong-ok (PRK)	9.225	9.025	7.375	-	25.625
178	Lydia Williams (CAN)	0	8.837	8.075	8.637	25.549
179	Cho Yoon-jung (KOR)	-	8.775	8.237	8.5	25.512
180	Michaela Řádková (CZE)	8.887	-	8.087	8.487	25.461
181	Diana Petrova (BUL)	8.937	-	7.525	8.362	24.824
182	Janerky de la Peña (CUB)	9.15	-	8.075	7.512	24.737
183	Joy Studer (SUI)	-	8.612	8.362	7.362	24.336
184	Ursula Botha (RSA)	8.512	-	7.812	8	24.324
185	Veneta Hristova (BUL)	-	8.4	7.737	7.55	23.687
186	Jana Drábiková (SVK)	-	8.037	7.175	7.862	23.074
187	Jovana Teodorovic (SCG)	0	6.95	7.725	7.287	21.962
188	Danushka Wijerathna (SRI)	7.687	2.65	5.187	5.962	21.486
189	Chalani Upendra (SRI)	6.6	3.775	5.425	5.575	21.375
190	Madushani Buddhika (SRI)	6.9	2.725	5.4	6.2	21.225
191	Achini Chamen (SRI)	6.062	4.25	4.187	6.55	21.049
192	Maduka Madiwila (SRI)	6.312	3.3	3.75	6.1	19.462
193	Irina Krasnyanska (UKR)	-	9.537	9.437	-	18.974
194	Wang Tiantian (CHN)	9.362	-	-	9.225	18.587
195	Elizabeth Tweddle (GBR)	-	9.525	8.837	-	18.362
196	Monica Roșu (ROM)	9.475	8.862	-	-	18.337
197	Amelie Plante (CAN)	9.05	9.2	-	-	18.25
198	Hollie Vise (USA)	-	9.5	8.725	-	18.225
199	Sara Moro (ESP)	-	9.137	9.075	-	18.212
200	Terin Humphrey (USA)	9.125	-	-	9.05	18.175
201	Natalia Sirobaba (UKR)	9.287	-	-	8.837	18.124
202	Ludmila Ezhova (RUS)	-	8.537	9.425	-	17.962
203	Erika Mizoguchi (JPN)	-	9.1	8.775	-	17.875
204	Janina Jeworutzki (GER)	9.075	-	-	8.712	17.787
205	Maika Mizutori (JPN)	8.925	-	-	8.862	17.787
206	Heike Gunne (GER)	-	9.212	8.512	-	17.724
207	Tatiana Zharganova (BLR)	-	9.462	8.237	-	17.699
208	Aleksandra Shevchenko (RUS)	9.3	-	-	8.187	17.487
209	Gaelle Richard (FRA)	9.125	8.362	-	-	17.487
210	Danielle Kelly (AUS)	9.05	-	-	8.437	17.487
211	Nikoletta Drótos (HUN)	8.887	8.45	-	-	17.337
212	Scarlett Guzmán (MEX)	8.5	8.375	-	-	16.875
213	Aksana Novikava (BLR)	8.862	-	-	7.5	16.362
214	Gergana Ivanova (BUL)	8.975	7.15	-	-	16.125
215	Leslie Nuñez (MEX)	-	-	7.725	8.225	15.95
216	Anna Csire (HUN)	-	-	7.925	7.462	15.387
217	Laura van Leeuwen (NED)	-	9.237	-	-	9.237
218	Kim Ji-young (KOR)	8.75	-	-	-	8.75
219	Marina Papadopoulou (GRE)	-	-	8.437	-	8.437
220	Petra Mudráková (SVK)	8.425	-	-	-	8.425
221	Tamaryn Enslin (RSA)	-	8.337	-	-	8.337
222	Ilaria Rosso (ITA)	-	-	-	8.137	8.137
223	Petra Sulcová (CZE)	-	7.4	-	-	7.4
224	Isabella Robledo (COL)	-	0	-	0	0

=== Team ===
Rank	Team	Vault (gymnastics)	Uneven bars	Balance beam	Floor (gymnastics)	Total
1st place, gold medalist(s)	United States	27.837 (3)	28.112 (3)	28.399 (2)	28.225 (1)	112.573
1st place, gold medalist(s)	Chellsie Memmel	9.275	9.637	9.575	9.400	112.573
1st place, gold medalist(s)	Carly Patterson	9.237		9.312	9.525	112.573
1st place, gold medalist(s)	Tasha Schwikert	9.325	9.600			112.573
1st place, gold medalist(s)	Hollie Vise		8.875	9.512		112.573
1st place, gold medalist(s)	Terin Humphrey				9.300	112.573
1st place, gold medalist(s)	Courtney Kupets					112.573
2nd place, silver medalist(s)	Romania	27.949 (2)	27.174 (8)	28.236 (3)	27.474 (3)	110.833
2nd place, silver medalist(s)	Cătălina Ponor	9.287		9.237	9.600	110.833
2nd place, silver medalist(s)	Oana Ban		9.162	9.537	9.337	110.833
2nd place, silver medalist(s)	Alexandra Eremia		9.025	9.462		110.833
2nd place, silver medalist(s)	Andreea Munteanu	9.300			8.537	110.833
2nd place, silver medalist(s)	Monica Roșu	9.362				110.833
2nd place, silver medalist(s)	Florica Leonida		8.987			110.833
3rd place, bronze medalist(s)	Australia	27.612 (5)	28.362 (1)	27.037 (4)	27.324 (4)	110.335
3rd place, bronze medalist(s)	Allana Slater	9.225	9.587	9.175	9.325	110.335
3rd place, bronze medalist(s)	Monette Russo	9.112	9.400	9.187	9.187	110.335
3rd place, bronze medalist(s)	Belinda Archer	9.275			8.812	110.335
3rd place, bronze medalist(s)	Jacqui Dunn		9.375	8.675		110.335
3rd place, bronze medalist(s)	Stephanie Moorhouse					110.335
3rd place, bronze medalist(s)	Danielle Kelly					110.335
4	China	27.061 (7)	28.062 (4)	28.587 (1) pen 0.2	26.749 (7)	110.259
4	Zhang Nan	9.237		9.625	8.587	110.259
4	Li Ya		9.587	9.487		110.259
4	Lin Li		9.450		9.337	110.259
4	Fan Ye		9.025	9.475		110.259
4	Kang Xin	9.087			8.825	110.259
4	Wang Tiantian	8.737				110.259
5	Spain	26.824 (8)	28.237 (2)	26.437 (6)	28.224 (2)	109.722
5	Elena Gómez	9.187	9.500	9.175	9.612	109.722
5	Mónica Mesalles	9.175			9.087	109.722
5	Patricia Moreno	8.462			9.525	109.722
5	Sara Moro		9.287	8.437		109.722
5	Tania Gener		9.450			109.722
5	Lenika de Simone			8.825		109.722
6	Russia	28.237 (1)	27.650 (7)	26.586 (5)	26.512 (8)	108.985
6	Anna Pavlova	9.400	9.100	9.537	9.287	108.985
6	Svetlana Khorkina	9.475	9.250	8.912	9.650	108.985
6	Ludmila Ezhova		9.300	8.137		108.985
6	Elena Zamolodchikova	9.362				108.985
6	Aleksandra Shevchenko				7.575	108.985
6	Elena Anochina					108.985
7	Ukraine	27.649 (4)	27.712 (6)	25.887 (7)	26.987 (6)	108.535
7	Irina Yarotska		9.550	8.562	9.225	108.535
7	Alina Kozich		8.600	8.525	9.500	108.535
7	Irina Krasnyanska		9.562	9.100		108.535
7	Alona Kvasha	9.337			8.262	108.535
7	Marina Proskurina	9.262				108.535
7	Natalia Sirobaba	9.050				108.535
8	Brazil	27.537 (6)	27.949 (5)	24.499 (8)	27.312 (5)	107.297
8	Ana Paula Rodrigues		9.362	8.775	9.175	107.297
8	Camila Comin	9.187		7.587	9.237	107.297
8	Daiane dos Santos	9.150			8.900	107.297
8	Daniele Hypólito		9.275	8.137		107.297
8	Caroline Molinari		9.312			107.297
8	Laís Souza	9.200				107.297

- Note: Annia Hatch and Ashley Postell were originally named to the US team, but both withdrew from the competition due to a knee injury (Hatch) and a severe case of the flu (Postell). Chellsie Memmel and Terin Humphrey were flown in as alternates to replace them. After a successful performance in the qualification round, Courtney Kupets severely injured her Achilles tendon and the US was then down to 5 athletes, as it was too late to call in their third alternate (Samantha Sheehan) after competition had already begun.

=== All-around ===
Rank	Gymnast	Vault (gymnastics)	Uneven bars	Balance beam	Floor (gymnastics)	Total
1st place, gold medalist(s)	Svetlana Khorkina (RUS)	9.312	9.662	9.475	9.675	38.124
2nd place, silver medalist(s)	Carly Patterson (USA)	9.262	9.525	9.612	9.537	37.936
3rd place, bronze medalist(s)	Zhang Nan (CHN)	9.250	9.262	9.700	9.412	37.624
4	Irina Yarotska (UKR)	9.125	9.537	9.287	9.362	37.311
5	Elena Gómez (ESP)	9.175	9.362	9.212	9.537	37.286
6	Oana Ban (ROU)	9.175	9.125	9.562	9.400	37.262
7	Kang Xin (CHN)	9.050	9.400	9.337	9.375	37.162
8	Alina Kozich (UKR)	9.200	9.337	9.137	9.300	36.974
8	Chellsie Memmel (USA)	9.325	9.362	8.875	9.412	36.974
10	Anna Pavlova (RUS)	9.412	8.812	9.250	9.262	36.736
11	Émilie Le Pennec (FRA)	9.037	9.337	9.125	8.950	36.449
12	Monette Russo (AUS)	9.112	8.875	9.262	9.137	36.386
13	Allana Slater (AUS)	9.150	8.525	9.350	9.337	36.362
14	Kylie Stone (CAN)	9.162	8.900	9.012	9.175	36.249
15	Andreea Munteanu (ROU)	9.237	8.125	9.200	9.512	36.074
16	Monica Bergamelli (ITA)	9.212	9.000	8.925	8.900	36.037
17	Suzanne Harmes (NED)	9.187	9.112	8.525	9.112	35.936
18	Leyanet González (CUB)	9.375	8.687	8.487	9.337	35.886
19	Camila Comin (BRA)	9.200	9.150	8.550	8.900	35.800
20	Daria Bijak (GER)	9.150	8.862	8.600	8.937	35.549
21	Aagje Vanwalleghem (BEL)	9.125	8.862	8.650	8.862	35.499
22	Patricia Moreno (ESP)	9.150	9.037	7.862	9.337	35.386
23	Ayaka Sahara (JPN)	9.050	8.887	8.787	8.437	35.161
24	Daniele Hypólito (BRA)				3.287	3.287

=== Vault ===
Rank	Gymnast	Vault 1	Vault 2	Total
1st place, gold medalist(s)	Oksana Chusovitina (UZB)	9.500	9.462	9.481
2nd place, silver medalist(s)	Kang Yun Mi (PRK)	9.575	9.312	9.443
2nd place, silver medalist(s)	Elena Zamolodchikova (RUS)	9.450	9.437	9.443
4	Monica Roșu (ROU)	9.387	9.362	9.374
5	Anna Pavlova (RUS)	9.387	9.325	9.356
6	Coralie Chacon (FRA)	9.437	9.175	9.306
7	Leyanet González (CUB)	9.350	9.200	9.275
8	Alona Kvasha (UKR)	9.237	8.825	9.031

=== Uneven bars ===
Rank	Gymnast	Total
1st place, gold medalist(s)	Chellsie Memmel (USA)	9.612
1st place, gold medalist(s)	Hollie Vise (USA)	9.612
3rd place, bronze medalist(s)	Elizabeth Tweddle (GBR)	9.512
4	Pyon Kwang-sun (PRK)	9.500
5	Lin Li (CHN)	9.350
6	Irina Yarotska (UKR)	9.300
7	Irina Krasnyanska (UKR)	8.875
8	Fan Ye (CHN)	8.525

=== Balance beam ===
Rank	Gymnast	Total
1st place, gold medalist(s)	Fan Ye (CHN)	9.812
2nd place, silver medalist(s)	Cătălina Ponor (ROU)	9.587
3rd place, bronze medalist(s)	Ludmila Ezhova (RUS)	9.550
4	Li Ya (CHN)	9.450
5	Elena Gómez (ESP)	8.887
6	Chellsie Memmel (USA)	8.837
7	Irina Krasnyanska (UKR)	8.550
8	Monette Russo (AUS)	8.537

=== Floor exercise ===
Rank	Gymnast	Total
1st place, gold medalist(s)	Daiane dos Santos (BRA)	9.737
2nd place, silver medalist(s)	Cătălina Ponor (ROU)	9.700
3rd place, bronze medalist(s)	Elena Gómez (ESP)	9.675
4	Andreea Munteanu (ROU)	9.400
5	Émilie Le Pennec (FRA)	9.387
6	Suzanne Harmes (NED)	9.287
7	Anna Pavlova (RUS)	9.237
8	Alona Kvasha (UKR)	7.687

Daiane dos Santos became the first Brazilian female world champion in gymnastics.

== Medal count ==
=== Overall ===
Rank	Nation	Gold	Silver	Bronze	Total
1	China (CHN)	5	2	1	8
2	United States (USA)	5	2	0	7
3	Japan (JPN)	2	0	2	4
4	Bulgaria (BUL)	2	0	0	2
5	Russia (RUS)	1	2	3	6
6	Brazil (BRA)	1	0	0	1
6	Greece (GRE)	1	0	0	1
6	Uzbekistan (UZB)	1	0	0	1
9	Romania (ROU)	0	4	0	4
10	Italy (ITA)	0	1	2	3
11	North Korea (PRK)	0	1	0	1
12	Canada (CAN)	0	0	2	2
13	Australia (AUS)	0	0	1	1
13	Great Britain (GBR)	0	0	1	1
13	Spain (ESP)	0	0	1	1
Totals (15 entries)		18	12	13	43

=== Men ===
Rank	Nation	Gold	Silver	Bronze	Total
1	China	4	2	0	6
2	United States	2	1	0	3
3	Japan	2	0	2	4
4	Bulgaria	2	0	0	2
5	Greece	1	0	0	1
6	Italy	0	1	2	3
6	Russia	0	1	2	3
8	Romania	0	1	0	1
9	Canada	0	0	2	2
Totals (9 entries)		11	6	8	25

=== Women ===
Rank	Nation	Gold	Silver	Bronze	Total
1	United States	3	1	0	4
2	Russia	1	1	1	3
3	China	1	0	1	2
4	Brazil	1	0	0	1
4	Uzbekistan	1	0	0	1
6	Romania	0	3	0	3
7	North Korea	0	1	0	1
8	Australia	0	0	1	1
8	Great Britain	0	0	1	1
8	Spain	0	0	1	1
Totals (10 entries)		7	6	5	18
