= María José de la Fuente =

Bolivian artistic gymnast

- Full name: María José de la Fuente Parada
- Born: 2 December 1988 (age 37) Santiago, Chile
- Height: 150 cm (4 ft 11 in)

Gymnastics career
- Discipline: Women's artistic gymnastics
- Country represented: Bolivia
- Club: Club 7

María José de la Fuente Parada (born 2 December 1988) is a Bolivian former artistic gymnast. She competed at the 2004 Summer Olympics, becoming Bolivia's first Olympian in artistic gymnastics. She also competed at the 2003 World Championships.

== Early life ==
De la Fuente was born in Santiago, Chile, but moved to Bolivia with her family at the age of four. She also has two sisters. She began artistic gymnastics one year later, as her mother was a gymnast who wanted her children in the sport.

== Gymnastics career ==
De la Fuente began competing in international competitions in 1997 and became the Bolivian all-around champion in both the senior and junior divisions in 2002. She successfully defended her national all-around title in 2003 and was the only Bolivian gymnast selected to compete at the 2003 World Championships in Anaheim, California. She finished 143rd in the all-around qualifications out of the 152 competitiors that completed all four events with a total score of 30.287.

De la Fuente received an invite from the Tripartite Commission to compete at the 2004 Summer Olympics in Athens. She left school for five months to focus on increasing her training for the Olympic Games. She finished 61st in the all-around qualifications out of the 63 competitors that completed all four events, with a total score of 32.649. Her best apparatus result was on the floor exercise, where she placed 75th. As of 2024, she is the only artistic gymnast to compete for Bolivia at the Olympics.

== Personal life ==
After retiring from gymnastics, De la Fuente moved to Buenos Aires, Argentina, and studied medicine at Austral University. She got married in 2014, and as of 2021, she works as a dietitian.
