= Aura Andreea Munteanu =

Romanian gymnast

Andreea Munteanu
- Full name: Aura Andreea Munteanu
- Born: 20 September 1988 (age 37) Constanța, Constanța County, Romania

Gymnastics career
- Discipline: Women's artistic gymnastics
- Country represented: Romania
- Head coach: Octavian Bellu
- Choreographer: Adriana Pop
Medal record
World Championships
Silver medal – second place	2003 Anaheim	Team

Aura Andreea Munteanu (Romanian pronunciation: [ˈawra anˈdree̯a munˈte̯anu]; born 20 September 1988), known as Andreea Munteanu, is a retired Romanian gymnast.

== Career ==
Munteanu became interested in gymnastics in 1994 after watching a competition on television. She began using her mother's bed as a makeshift vault, prompting her parents to enroll her for lessons at the CSS Farul Constanţa club. She progressed well in the sport and was accepted to train at the national training center in Deva in October 2002.

Less than a year after beginning her training at Deva, in 2003, Munteanu became the Romanian national champion. Later that year, she was selected as part of the Romanian team for the 2003 World Artistic Gymnastics Championships. The Romanians had a disappointing team competition, losing the title they had held for eight years; however, they still finished the meet in second place. In the all-around competition, Munteanu finished 15th after a fall on the uneven bars. In the floor exercise final, she finished fourth with a routine choreographed to music from The Mask by Adriana Pop.

Munteanu did not compete at the 2004 European Championships, but was selected for the Romanian team for the 2004 Olympics in Athens. However, days before the Olympics began, she was forced to withdraw, suffering from shin splints. She was replaced by Silvia Stroescu.

Munteanu's recovery was predicted to take six months; however, new injuries and major changes in the Romanian gymnastics system, including the resignation of head coaches Octavian Bellu and Mariana Bitang, delayed her return to competitive form.

In early 2006, Munteanu resumed training with new national team head coach Nicolae Forminte in Deva. She did not compete at the 2006 European Championships, but was still considered to be in contention for the Romanian team at the 2006 Worlds. However, in June, she retired from gymnastics due to nagging back injuries.
