= Jana Komrsková =

Czech artistic gymnast

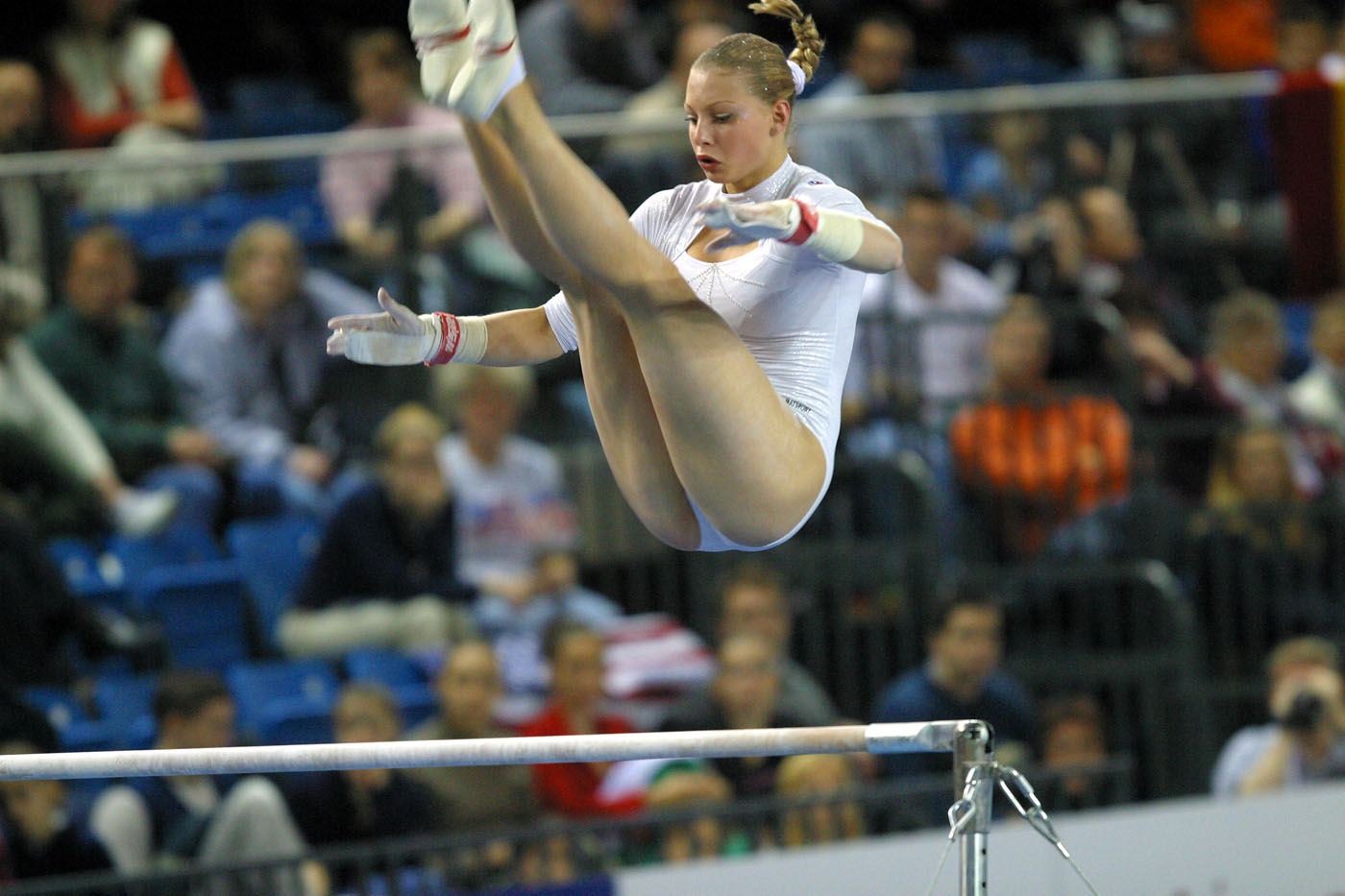
- Komrsková at World Artistic Gymnastics Championships in Debrecen, 2002

Personal information
- Born: 6 May 1983 (age 43) Roudnice nad Labem, Czechoslovakia
- Height: 1.67 m (5 ft 6 in)

Gymnastics career
- Discipline: Women's artistic gymnastics
- Country represented: Czech Republic
- Retired: 2007

Jana Komrsková (born 6 May 1983) is a Czech artistic gymnast. She competed in the 2000 and 2004 Summer Olympics.

== Early life ==
Komrsková was born on 6 May 1983 in Roudnice nad Labem to father Jan Komrska, a gymnastics coach, and mother Zdena Komrsková (née Dorňáková), a 1972 Olympian. She started gymnastics at the age of four and was coached by her parents in Zlín. Her younger sister, Aneta, also competed in gymnastics, while her older sister, Lucie, was a leading Czech long jumper.

== Gymnastics career ==
At the age of 10, Komrsková became a member of the Czech national junior team, and in 1995, she participated in the European Junior Championships for the first time. Two years later, she won three titles in the senior national championships in 1997, including the all-around title, with particularly strong performances on the uneven bars and vault.

=== 1999–2000 ===
At the 1999 World Artistic Gymnastics Championships in Tianjin, Komrsková qualified to the all-around final in ninth place, but major faults on beam sent her back to 33rd in the all-around final. The Czech team finished in 16th place, qualifying two gymnasts to the 2000 Olympics in Sydney.

In the Olympic year, Komrsková recorded her first success in a World Cup competition (second place on vault in Cottbus, behind Russia's Yelena Produnova) and finished ninth in the all-around at the 2000 European Championships.

She and Kateřina Marešová competed for the Czech Republic at the 2000 Summer Olympics. Komrsková qualified for the individual all-around final in 29th place despite an infection contracted through blisters on her forearm. Immediately after the final, she underwent minor surgery.

After the Games, Komrsková placed fourth on uneven bars and vault at the World Cup final in Glasgow.

=== 2001–2004 ===
Following several podium finishes in World Cup events, Komrsková was one of the favorites for the vault title at the 2001 World Championships in Ghent. She advanced to the final and finished fourth behind Svetlana Khorkina, Oksana Chusovitina, and Andreea Răducan, losing the bronze medal to Răducan by 0.037 points.

Komrsková was the stand-by for the uneven bars final at the 2002 European Championships and the vault final at the 2003 World Championships, missing the former by 0.012. Her 11th-place finish in the all-around at the 2002 European Championships was her top result in those two years. At the 2003 Worlds in Anaheim, California, she clinched the only Czech berth for the 2004 Summer Olympics, but injured her elbow in the process. At the end of the year, she also broke bones in her foot. She missed the 2004 national and European championships but recovered in time for the Olympics in Athens.

At the Olympics, Komrsková finished 32nd in the all-around qualification and was the second alternate for the final. She said afterward: "When I was in the Olympic Games before, I was younger and I was a bit overwhelmed. Now, it's a normal competition for me. I still think the Olympics is the most important competition for an athlete, but now I am a lot more relaxed about it."

=== 2005–2008 ===
After the 2004 Olympics, Komrsková decided to end her gymnastics career and try pole vaulting, following the example of Daniela Bártová, a former Czech gymnast who went on to set pole vaulting records. However, Komrsková was hindered by her elbow injury. She then tried to join her sister Lucie in long jumping, but ultimately decided to return to gymnastics.

Her parents had retired from coaching, so Komrsková began training with the Czech national team coach, Stanislav Vyzina, in Brno. She returned to national competitions in late 2005 and went on to win her first World Cup title: a gold medal on vault at the B-category World Cup in Maribor, Slovenia. In 2006, she performed well at several World Cup events, winning gold on vault and bronze on balance beam in Maribor, and silver on vault in Moscow and Lyon.

At the 2006 European Championships in Volos, Greece, Komrsková finished fourth in the vault final, only 0.075 off the podium. She also recorded the 11th best all-around total in qualifications, though no individual all-around final was held. At the Czech national championships, she won four of five possible titles.

Komrsková was the highest-scoring Czech gymnast at the 2006 World Championships and narrowly missed the all-around final: She finished 32nd in qualifications, making her the second alternate. She went on to win the vault titles at the 2006 World Cup final in Brazil and the 2007 European Championships in Amsterdam. At the 2007 World Championships in Stuttgart, she finished seventh on vault, with high execution marks but relatively low difficulty.

The Czech Republic earned one gymnastics berth for the 2008 Summer Olympics. As the only Czech gymnast to qualify to a final at the 2007 World Championships, Komrsková was a front-runner for the spot. However, she retired in 2007 instead, saying that because she had been to the Olympics twice, it was time for another Czech gymnast to have the opportunity.
