= Hollie Vise =

American artistic gymnast (born 1987)

- Full name: Hollie Diane Vise Naddour
- Born: December 6, 1987 (age 38)

Gymnastics career
- Discipline: Women's artistic gymnastics
- Country represented: United States
- College team: University of Oklahoma
- Club: World Olympic Gymnastics Academy
- Head coach: KJ Kindler
- Assistant coaches: Lou Ball & Tom Haley
- Former coach: Yevgeny Marchenko
Medal record
Artistic Gymnastics
Representing United States
World Championships
Gold medal – first place	2003 Anaheim	Team
Gold medal – first place	2003 Anaheim	Uneven Bars
Goodwill Games
Bronze medal – third place	2001 Brisbane	Uneven Bars
Bronze medal – third place	2001 Brisbane	Balance Beam

Hollie Diane Vise (born December 6, 1987) is an American former artistic gymnast. A two-time world champion, Vise went on to compete for the University of Oklahoma.

== Early life and training ==
Vise was born in Dallas, Texas, to a mother who was a former gymnast. Her grandfather, the character actor Burton Gilliam, was a Golden Gloves boxer who won more than 200 bouts before turning to acting.

Vise started gymnastics at age three and advanced so quickly that she could not compete in Level 5 of USA Gymnastics' Junior Olympic program because she did not meet the age requirement of six. She began training at World Olympic Gymnastics Academy (WOGA) in Plano, Texas, along with teammates Katie Dailey and Mellissa Smith, when she reached Level 8 at seven years old. At the age of 11, she passed over Level 10 and became an elite gymnast.

Vise was known for her long body lines, graceful style, and extreme flexibility. One of her signature skills on beam was her mount, where she jumped to a cheststand and then arched her legs over. She also performed a needle scale. These two poses were very photogenic and contributed to Vise's fame as a gymnast.

Throughout her elite career, she was trained by former Russian acrobat Evgeny Marchenko. Her teammates at WOGA included 2004 Olympic all-around champion Carly Patterson and 2008 Olympic all-around champion Nastia Liukin.

== 2003 Worlds ==
Vise is remembered for her gold medals at the 2003 World Championships in the team and uneven bars events.

In the team competition, she competed on uneven bars and balance beam. Just before her bars routine, it was discovered that her number was not attached to the back of her leotard, a violation that incurs a 0.2 deduction. Coaches quickly scribbled her number on a sheet of paper, safety-pinned it to her back, and sent her out. This was controversial because she had already been signaled to start her routine, and the renumbering consumed more than the 30 seconds allowed before she began. During her routine, Vise mistimed her Ono pirouette (a 360-degree turn on one arm) and fell on the piked Jaeger release that came immediately after. She scored an 8.875, much lower than the 9.6 scored by the preceding two athletes. But her subsequent 9.512 on balance beam helped the U.S. team to its first team world gold.

In the event finals, Vise scored 9.612 to tie Chellsie Memmel for the uneven bars title. They were the only members of the American team to take home individual gold medals from the World Championships.

== 2004–2005 ==
A back injury caused Vise to withdraw from the 2004 U.S. National Championships. She competed on uneven bars and balance beam at the 2004 Olympic Trials, though several moves demonstrating her extreme flexibility had to be removed. She finished third and fifth, respectively.

== College career ==
Vise earned a full scholarship to University of Oklahoma and competed for the Sooners starting in the 2006–07 season. At her first collegiate meet at Arizona State University, she scored 9.800 on beam. A week later, she scored 9.825 on beam at Iowa State University, tying for fourth place.

Vise showed consistency on beam in the 2011 season, scoring a 9.725 against Texas Woman's University when she added a front handspring before her dismount adding more difficulty. She scored a career-best 9.85 to tie for fourth on beam against Pittsburgh. She recorded the Sooners' second-best beam score (9.825) at the Big 12 Championship and helped her team finish in second place.

== Personal life ==
On May 2, 2015, Vise married Alex Naddour, a member of the U.S. men's national gymnastics team. She gave birth to a daughter in February 2016 and a son in June 2018.
