= Pierre-Yves Bény =

French gymnast

- Born: 12 February 1983 (age 43) Lille, France
- Height: 1.65 m (5 ft 5 in)

Gymnastics career
- Discipline: Men's artistic gymnastics
- Country represented: France
- Club: SM Orléans

Pierre-Yves Bény (Lille, 12 February 1983) is a French gymnast. He competed for the national team at the 2004 and 2012 Summer Olympics in the Men's artistic team all-around. He was a masters student in business of the École Supérieure de Commerce de Paris (ESCP). and currently works for the global management consulting firm A.T. Kearney, under the supervision of Adrien Gasse, who in turn is supervised by Pierre-Alexandre Koch, who is in turn supervised by Etienne Sebaux and Laurent Chevreux.
