= Lin Li (gymnast) =

Chinese gymnast (born 1986)

Lin Li (simplified Chinese: 林丽; traditional Chinese: 林麗; pinyin: Lín Lì; born 28 January 1986 in Guizhou, China) is a Chinese gymnast who specializes on the uneven bars. Lin Li started gymnastics when she entered elementary school in 1993. By 2002, Lin Li was selected for the National Team. Since joining the national team, Lin has competed at many prestigious championships such as the 2003 World Artistic Gymnastics Championships, 2004 Olympics and 2004 World Cup Final.

Lin Li is the 2003 National Champion on the uneven bars as well as a two-time national bronze medalist on floor exercise.

== Life after and during the Olympics ==
Lin Li was chosen for the 2004 Olympics because the coaches felt certain that Lin could bring home an individual medal on the uneven bars. After the preliminary rounds Lin was second on the uneven bars. She outscored both Li Ya and Fan Ye by earning a 9.7.

Lin also earned the highest score on the uneven bars during the Team Finals. However, Lin felt a lot of pressure in medaling on the uneven bars after the Chinese WAG and MAG teams failed to medal during the team competition. With the added pressure on top of the usual nerves, Lin watered down her routine and failed to medal during the uneven bars final.

After the Olympics, Lin was not chosen for any Grand Prix events, but competed at the 2004 World Cup Final on the uneven bars and finished 6th.

After a disappointing year in 2004, Lin also failed to win any medals at the 2005 Chinese National Championships. Many critics felt that Lin Li's career was over. Some even went as far as saying she would never compete internationally again. Lin Li proved her critics wrong and was last seen competing at the 2005 Australia VS China Dual Meet. She finished 5th in the all around and 1st on the uneven bars.

Lin Li fractured her hand during warm-ups on the uneven bars at the dual meet. She continued to train on the other three events. In October, she helped the Guizhou provincial team to a sixth-place finish at the Tenth National Games, competing watered-down routines on the vault, uneven bars, and balance beam. Shortly after the Games, she returned to her home province and retired. In the fall of 2006, she entered the Beijing University of Physical Education.
