= Kateřina Marešová =

Czech artistic gymnast

- Born: 27 January 1984 (age 42)

Gymnastics career
- Discipline: Women's artistic gymnastics
- Country represented: Czech Republic (2000)

Kateřina Marešová (born 27 January 1984) was a Czech female artistic gymnast, representing her nation at international competitions.

She participated at the 2000 Summer Olympics, and the 2003 World Artistic Gymnastics Championships.
