= Wang Tiantian =

Chinese artistic gymnast

- Born: February 14, 1986 (age 40) Tianjin

Gymnastics career
- Discipline: Women's artistic gymnastics
- Country represented: China
Medal record
Summer Universiade
Gold medal – first place	2005 Izmir	Team
National Games
Silver medal – second place	2001 Guangzhou	Floor Exercise

Wang Tiantian (Chinese: 王湉湉; pinyin: Wáng Tiántián; born 14 February 1986) is a Chinese former artistic gymnast.

== Gymnastics career ==
Wang's first major competition was at the 2003 Asian Championship. She won the vault finals as well a silver medal on floor exercise. Her success at Asian Championship gave her the chance to compete at the 2003 World Championships where she placed 4th with her team. In 2004 Wang became China's National All Around Champion and Triple Silver Medalist during Event Finals (vault, uneven bars and floor). She competed at the 2004 Summer Olympics and the 2004 World Cup Final. In the 2004 Summer Olympics in Athens she qualified for the Vault finals and the Individual All-Around. She had a weak showing in these Olympics. In the team final she fell on floor exercise (underrotating her triple twist in her final pass and putting her hands down) and scored an 8.637. She fell on her beam dismount in the Individual AA competition and scored an 8.725 (she ended up 13th that night). She then fell on her first Vault in the event finals and averaged a 9.081 (ranking 7th). She did not win any medals in either the Olympics or the World Cup. Before the World Cup Finals, Wang had some success at the 2004 Trophee Massilia Cup, where she won five medals (2 gold, 1 silver, 2 bronze). In 2005, she won bronze medals on vault at the 2005 National Championships and at the 2005 Cottbus Cup.

In October, 2005, Wang Tiantian competed at the National Games, but a nagging foot injury hampered her performance. The injury kept her out of the East Asia Games several weeks later and eventually required surgery at the end of 2005.

As of January 2006, she was still recovering from the injury but had rejoined the National Team in Beijing.
