= Val Buffham-Norris =

Australian gymnast (born 1943)

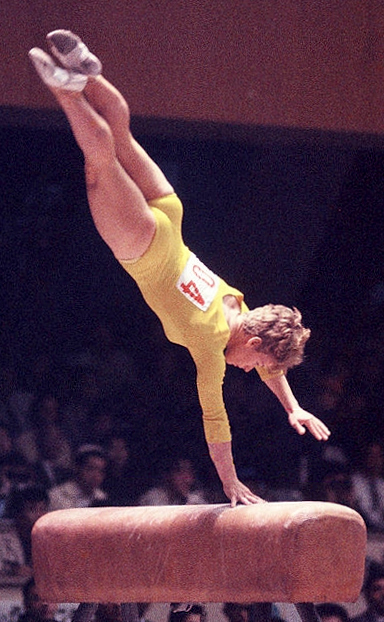
- Buffham-Norris at the 1964 Olympics

Personal information
- Full name: Valerie Ivy Buffham-Norris
- Nationality: Australian
- Born: 28 June 1943 (age 83) Perth, Australia
- Height: 1.52 m (5 ft 0 in)
- Weight: 48 kg (106 lb)

Sport
- Sport: Artistic gymnastics

Valerie Ivy "Val" Buffham-Norris (born 28 June 1943) is a retired Australian gymnast. She competed at the 1964 and 1968 Olympics in all artistic gymnastics events and finished in 10th place with the Australian team in 1964. Her best individual result was 58th place on the vault in 1968.
