= Maria Apostolidi =

Greek artistic gymnast (born 1988)

- Born: 30 December 1988 (age 37) Athens, Greece

Gymnastics career
- Discipline: Women's artistic gymnastics
- Country represented: Greece (2004)

Maria Apostolidi (born 30 December 1988) was a Greek female artistic gymnast, and represented her nation at international competitions.

She participated at the 2004 Summer Olympics, and at the 2003 World Artistic Gymnastics Championships.
