= Yvonne Musik =

German artistic gymnast

- Born: 21 December 1985 (age 40)

Gymnastics career
- Discipline: Women's artistic gymnastics
- Country represented: Germany; (2004)

Yvonne Musik (born 21 December 1985) is a German female artistic gymnast, representing her nation at international competitions.

She participated at the 2003 World Artistic Gymnastics Championships, and the 2004 Summer Olympics.
