= Zandre Labuschagne =

- Born: July 8, 1986 (age 40)

Gymnastics career
- Discipline: Women's artistic gymnastics
- Country represented: South Africa; (2004)
- College team: UIC Flames

Zandre Labuschagne (born 8 July 1986) is a South African female artistic gymnast, representing her nation at international competitions.

She participated at the 2004 Summer Olympics, and the 2003 World Artistic Gymnastics Championships.
