= Mónica Mesalles =

Spanish artistic gymnast

Monica Mesalles
- Born: 2 October 1987 (age 38) Barcelona, Spain

Gymnastics career
- Discipline: Women's artistic gymnastics
- Country represented: Spain (2003)

Monica Mesalles (born 2 October 1987) was a Spanish artistic gymnast, representing her nation at international competitions.

Mesalles participated at the 2004 Summer Olympics. She also competed at world championships, including the 2003 World Artistic Gymnastics Championships in Anaheim.
