= Laura van Leeuwen (gymnast) =

Dutch gymnast

Laura Antoinette van Leeuwen (born 22 April 1986 in The Hague) is a Dutch gymnast. Van Leeuwen competed in the all around; however, the uneven bars and vault are her best disciplines.

== Career ==
Her first notable moments came in 1999 when she took part in the Dutch National Championships, finishing 5th overall, 2nd on vault, 2nd on floor and becoming the uneven bars champion, which she also was in 2002, 2003 and 2004. In 2001, she was Dutch champion on vault.

In 2002, she took part in the International Romanian Championships winning both the beam and vault competitions and was fourth overall. At the 2002 Hypotheekshop Gymnastics Top, she won the uneven bars and in that same year became 5th at the World Championships. In 2003, she was part of the Dutch team that took part in the World Championships in Anaheim, but only finished in 16th position. Van Leeuwen represented the Netherlands at the 2004 Summer Olympics where she finished the 46th place in the women's individual all around competition. That same year she was part of the Dutch team that became 8th at the European Championships. She finished 6th at the World Gymnastics Championships in Cottbus on the uneven bars; In Chile she won the uneven bars World Cup and finished 5th in the balance beam and 6th on floor exercise. She also received 8th place in Ghent, 5th place in Stuttgart and an 8th place in Birmingham on the uneven bars at the World Cup events.

== Eponymous skill ==
Van Leeuwen has one eponymous skill listed in the Code of Points.

Apparatus	Name	Description	Difficulty (Note: Valid for the 2025–2028 Code of Points)
Uneven bars	Van Leeuwen	Pike sole circle (toe-on) backward through handstand and flight with 1/2 turn to high bar	E (0.5)

== Post-retirement ==
Laura van Leeuwen is a dentist and snowboard instructor now.
