= Melissa Munro =

Australian gymnast

Personal information
- Nationality: Australian
- Born: 8 February 1988 (age 37); Macksville, New South Wales, Australia

Sport
- Sport: Gymnastics

Melissa Munro (born 8 February 1988) is an Australian gymnast. She competed in the team event, where Australia finished 8th, at the 2004 Summer Olympics.
