= Krisztina Szarka =

Hungarian artistic gymnast

- Born: 25 June 1986 (age 40)

Gymnastics career
- Discipline: Women's artistic gymnastics
- Country represented: Hungary (2004)

Krisztina Szarka (born 25 June 1986) is a former artistic gymnast from Hungary. She competed at the 2004 Summer Olympics.
