= Stephanie Moorhouse =

Australian artistic gymnast

- Full name: Stephanie Louise Rae Moorhouse
- Nickname: Steph
- Born: 20 January 1987 (age 39) Melbourne, Victoria
- Height: 150 cm (4 ft 11 in)

Gymnastics career
- Discipline: Women's artistic gymnastics
- Country represented: Australia
- Club: VWHPC
- Head coaches: Tracey Penaluna and Misha Barabach
- Former coaches: Ross Bouskill and Katie Watts
- Retired: 2005
Medal record
Representing Australia
World Championships
Bronze medal – third place	2003 Anaheim	Team
Commonwealth Games
Gold medal – first place	2002 Manchester	Team

Stephanie Louise Rae Moorhouse (born 20 January 1987) is an Australian retired artistic gymnast. Moorhouse made her first Australian team in 1999, at the age of 12. She won gold with the Australian team at the 2002 Commonwealth Games while completing year 10 and was part of the bronze medal-winning team at the 2003 World Championships. She went on to compete at the 2004 Summer Olympics held in Athens while finishing off her VCE. Although she did not win a medal, she was an all-around finalist, ranking 20th.

== Early years ==
Moorhouse was born to Ann and Stephen Moorhouse. She has an older brother Nathan who, in his youth, performed recreational gymnastics. She thought it "looked fun" and received parental permission to begin gymnastics in 1991 at the age of four.

== Education ==
Moorhouse attended Methodist Ladies' College (MLC) and was a part of the MLC Victorian Gymnastics Club, Melbourne. She later attended Lauriston Girls' School. Moorhouse enrolled in La Trobe University in 2006 and graduated in 2009 with a Bachelor of Business: Sport and Leisure Management. In 2012, she enrolled at Deakin University and graduated in 2013 with a Bachelor of Sport and Exercise Science.

== Gymnastics career ==
Stephanie has had a number of coaches over the duration of her career, including: Ross Bouskill, Katie Watts, Tracey Penaluna and Misha Barabach. A typical training day consisted of Moorhouse waking up at 5:30am, be driven to training by her father 45 minutes away from her house; train from 7am – 10:30am; complete school from 11am to 3pm; train again from 3.30pm to 7pm; attend a physio, massage or sport psychologist appointment; have her father drive her back home where she would have dinner, do homework and head to bed early for a "refreshing" start the next day.

=== 1999 National Championships ===
Moorhouse and her team entered under the junior division and finished with excellent results. Out of the 6 categories, she won three gold medals in the team competition, all- around component (AA) and floor exercise (FX). Additionally, she won three silver medals on the uneven bars (UB), beam balance (BB) and vault (VT).

=== 2000 National Championships ===
Similarly, Moorhouse was entered under the junior division, where she won a single gold medal in the team competition and a single bronze medal in the VT. Otherwise, she ranked 4th, 8th, 8th and 5th in the AA, UB, BB, and FX respectively.

=== 2001 National Championships ===
Moorhouse was entered under the junior division earning a single silver medal in the team competition. She ranked 6th, 4th, 4th, 7th and 9th in the AA, VT, UB, BB and FX respectively.

=== 2001 Internationals Canberra Cup, Australia ===
In her first international event hosted by Canberra, Moorhouse ranked 19th, 10th and 12th in the AA, VT and FX respectively but did not qualify for the other three.

=== 2001 Australian Commonwealth Games Association (ACGA) Internationals, USA ===
Moorhouse won a single silver medal in the team component at ACGA. She ranked 9th, 5th, 9th, 9th and 12th in the AA, VT, UB, BB, and FX respectively.

=== 2001 International Pacific Alliance ===
Moorhouse won a single silver medal in the team component in the junior division, a single bronze medal in the VT and UB and ranked 6th in the AA. However she did not qualify for the BB and FX.

=== 2002 National Championships ===
For a final time under the junior division, Moorhouse produced four gold medals in the team competition, AA, UB, and BB, a single silver in VT but ranked 7th in FX.

=== 2002 Commonwealth Games Great Britain ===
Moorhouse qualified for the Commonwealth games held in Manchester and won a single gold medal in the team component.

=== 2002 China Motor Cup ===
In the same year, Moorhouse competed in China, and ranked 8th and 4th in the AA and FX respectively but did not qualify for the other components.

=== 2003 Australian Youth Olympic Festival (AYOF) ===
At the AYOF, Moorhouse won three gold medals in the UB, BB, and FX components. She also won two silver medals for the team and AA criteria but did not qualify for VT.

=== 2003 National Championships ===
In her penultimate national championship, Moorhouse was registered under the senior division, where she went on to win one gold medal in the team component and a silver medal in the FX. She ranked 6th and 5th in the AA and BB respectively but did not qualify for VT and UB.

=== 2003 World Olympic Gymnastics Academy (WOGA) Classic USA ===
Moorhouse attained 10th rank in the AA and a silver medal for the BB but did not qualify for the other components.

=== 2003 Parkettes Invitational USA ===
Moorhouse went on to compete at the Parkettes Invitational held in the US, attaining 5th rank in the AA and winning two bronze medals in the VT and FX.

=== 2003 Pacific Challenge USA ===
Moorhouse ranked fourth only for the team component.

=== 2003 8 Country Tournament ===
Moorhouse competed in the Netherlands winning a silver in the team component and ranking 6th and 4th places in the UB and BB respectively.

=== 2003 World Championships USA ===
Moorhouse competed in Anaheim, California and ranked 163rd in the AA but walked away with a bronze in the team component.

=== 2004 National Championships ===
In her final year at Nationals, Moorhouse won two gold medals both in the team component and BB and a silver in the AA. She ranked 4th in the FX but did not qualify for the VT or UB.

=== 2004 Glasgow World cup ===
Moorhouse qualified to go and compete in Scotland, where she ranked 4th only in the UB.

=== 2004 WOGA Classic USA ===
For the second time competing at WOGA, Moorhouse won a silver in the team component and attained a rank of 6th in the AA.

=== 2004 Pacific Alliance ===
Before the Olympic Games in Athens, Moorhouse competed in the Pacific Alliance winning a silver in the team component and ranking 6th both in the AA and FX.

=== 2004 Athens Olympic Games ===
Stephanie Moorhouse and her team consisting of Allana Slater, Lisa Skinner, Monette Russo, Karen Nguyen, and Melissa Munro qualified for the 2004 Athens Olympic Games.

In the horse vault, she received a qualification rank of 77 and scored 8.875, ranking 77/98 gymnasts with the third highest rank on the Australian team. On the uneven bars, she attained a qualification rank of 37T and a score of 9.337, ranking 37/98 gymnasts with the third highest rank on the Australian team. On the balance beam, she attained a qualification rank of 26 and scored 9.162, ranking 26/98 gymnasts with the fourth highest rank on the Australian team. On the floor exercise, she attained a qualification rank of 57T and score of 8.850, ranking 57/98 gymnasts with the third highest rank on the Australian team. In the Women's Individual All-Around (AA), Moorhouse placed 20th out of 98 gymnasts, cementing her third place on the Australian team. In the Women's Team All-Around, Moorhouse, alongside the rest of the Australian gymnastics team cleared 8th place ahead of Brazil by 0.35 points but fell behind Spain by a narrow 0.325 point margin.

Moorhouse retired from competitive artistic gymnastics in the following year at the age of 18.

== Acting career ==
Moorhouse made a brief gymnastics cameo appearance in, "Athens 2004: Games of the XXVIII Olympiad" (2004) and the Hollywood teen-comedy drama, "Stick it" (2006).

== Professional career ==
Upon graduating from La Trobe University, Moorhouse has dabbled in a variety of careers. In 2010, she was invited to return to the stadium as a Network Ten Gymnastics Commentator in the 2010 Delhi Commonwealth Games and was coached by former Olympian, Neil Kearney. She described her experience as, "just as nerve racking as performing in the actual event".

In 2014, she was a part of Life Saving Victoria as a sports events administrator and began expanding her Olympic career as part of the Victorian Olympic Council appointed an honorary officer. In 2017, she was promoted to board director of the Victorian Olympic Council.

In 2018, she was hired as a high performance manager at Waverly Gymnastics Centre focusing on "mentoring the next generation in achieving their goals".

Since 2019, she has held a leadership position as an Athlete Wellbeing and Engagement Manager at Gymnastics Australia.

== Personal life ==
In December 2017, Moorhouse was engaged to Tom Stainforth. The couple got married at Jack Rabbit Vineyard on 5 November 2018. On 2 January 2020, Moorhouse gave birth to son William Walker Stainforth at St Vincent's Private Hospital Melbourne.
