= Karen Nguyen =

Australian artistic gymnast

- Born: 24 November 1987 (age 38)

Gymnastics career
- Discipline: Women's artistic gymnastics
- Country represented: Australia (2006)

Karen Nguyen (born 24 November 1987) is an Australian female artistic gymnast, representing her nation at international competitions.

She participated at the 2004 Summer Olympics. She also competed at world championships, including the 2006 World Artistic Gymnastics Championships in Aarhus, Denmark.
