= Lisa Brüggemann =

German gymnast

Lisa Brueggemann
- Born: 29 December 1984 (age 41)

Gymnastics career
- Discipline: Women's artistic gymnastics
- Country represented: Germany

Lisa Brueggemann (born 29 December 1984) was a German female artistic gymnast, representing her nation at international competitions.

She participated at the 2004 Summer Olympics. She also competed at world championships, including the 2001 World Artistic Gymnastics Championships in Ghent, Belgium.
