= Coralie Chacon =

French artistic gymnast

- Born: 12 May 1987 (age 39) Nîmes
- Height: 152 cm (5 ft 0 in)

Gymnastics career
- Discipline: Women's artistic gymnastics
- Country represented: France
- Head coach: Véronique Legras
- Assistant coach: Frank Legras
- Choreographer: Adriana Pop

Coralie Chacon (born 12 May 1987) is a French former artistic gymnast. She competed at the 2004 Summer Olympics.
