= Monette Russo =

Australian artistic gymnast

- Full name: Monette Simone Russo
- Born: 4 August 1988 (age 38) Lilydale, Australia

Gymnastics career
- Discipline: Women's artistic gymnastics
- Country represented: Australia
- Retired: 2007
Medal record
Representing Australia
World Championships
Bronze medal – third place	2003 Anaheim	Team
Bronze medal – third place	2005 Melbourne	All-Around
Commonwealth Games
Gold medal – first place	2006 Melbourne	Team
Bronze medal – third place	2006 Melbourne	Uneven Bars
Pacific Rim Championships
Silver medal – second place	2006 Honolulu	Team

Monette Simone Russo (born 4 August 1988 in Lilydale, Victoria) is an Australian former artistic gymnast. She made history by becoming the first Australian gymnast ever to win an individual world championship medal at the 2005 World Artistic Gymnastics Championships in Melbourne, Australia, when she came third in the all-around competition and was also awarded the prestigious Longines Prize for Elegance. She also competed in three apparatus finals, finishing seventh on bars and fifth on beam and floor. Although more of an all-arounder than an events finalist, during her career she was one of the few women competing two vaults. She was also a part of the 2003 World Championships Team for Australia and won a bronze medal, another first for Australian gymnastics.

Monette is an Olympian, having helped Australia to 8th place in the team event at the 2004 Olympics. An injury prevented her from competing in the all-around final.

Injury also marred Monette's 2006 season. She competed at the Commonwealth Games in Melbourne, and although she had to reduce her difficulty considerably because of her injury (only one double salto on floor, for example), she still assisted Australia to the team gold. Having qualified to the all-around, bars, and beam finals, three more medals looked likely. However, injury prevented Monette from competing in the all-around, and she fell off the beam, while receiving a bronze on bars behind Elyse Hopfner-Hibbs and Shavahn Church.

At the 2006 Pacific Rim Championships, Russo contributed to the Australian team's silver-medal finish. Individually, she finished fourth on uneven bars and fifth on balance beam.

Monette retired from elite gymnastics in May 2007.
