= Allana Slater =

Australian artistic gymnast

- Full name: Allana Amy Slater
- Born: 3 April 1984 (age 42) Perth, Western Australia, Australia

Gymnastics career
- Discipline: Women's artistic gymnastics
- Country represented: Australia
- Club: Western Australian Institute of Sport
- Former coaches: Nikolai Lapchine; Jo Richards
- Retired: 2005
Medal record
Representing Australia
World Championships
Bronze medal – third place	2003 Anaheim	Team
World Cup Final
Silver medal – second place	2000 Glasgow	Uneven Bars
Bronze medal – third place	2002 Stuttgart	Floor Exercise
Commonwealth Games
Gold medal – first place	1998 Kuala Lumpur	Team
Gold medal – first place	2002 Manchester	Team
Gold medal – first place	2002 Manchester	Vault
Silver medal – second place	1998 Kuala Lumpur	All-Around
Silver medal – second place	1998 Kuala Lumpur	Floor Exercise
Silver medal – second place	2002 Manchester	Uneven Bars
Silver medal – second place	2002 Manchester	Balance Beam
Bronze medal – third place	2002 Manchester	All-Around

Allana Amy Slater (born 3 April 1984) is a retired Australian artistic gymnast. The Australian senior all-around National Champion in 2000, 2003 and 2004 and a multiple medalist at the Commonwealth Games, Slater is one of Australia's most internationally successful gymnasts.

== Early life ==
Allana Slater was born on 3 April 1984 in Perth, Western Australia. She started gymnastics at 16 months old.

== Gymnastics career ==
Slater competed at the 1998 Commonwealth Games in Kuala Lumpur, receiving Australia's first ever Commonwealth Games team gold medal. Individually, she also won two silver medals in the all around and floor exercise finals.

Slater and her Australian teammates finished fifth at the 1999 World Championships. At the same competition, Slater earned the highest place individual world ranking ever achieved by an Australian gymnast when she finished 9th in the individual all around.

In July 2000 at the Olympic Trials, Slater won to secure a place on her first Olympic team. The team finished in 7th place. Individually, Slater went on to compete in the individual all around where she finished in 16th place.

In the all-around final at Sydney 2000, Slater alerted officials to an equipment problem. Just before the third rotation, Slater, who was on vault in that rotation, realised that the vaulting horse seemed to be at the wrong height relative to her own stature and alerted her coach and the judges. Officials measured the apparatus and found that it had in fact been set 5 cm too low. The mistake was corrected and the gymnasts who had vaulted in the first two rotations were offered the chance to retake their vault. However, many had already been mentally affected by this mistake and subsequently performed worse in the other disciplines, while Britain's Annika Reeder had been injured and was forced to pull out of the event entirely.

After the Olympics, Slater returned to Europe at the end of the year to take part in the last two events on the World Cup Circuit.

In 2002, Slater won her second World Cup Grand Prix gold medal at the Cottbus event on the floor in Germany. The Pacific Alliance Championships soon followed and Slater helped the Australian team to a silver medal as well as picking up an individual silver medal on the floor exercise. At the Australian Championships, she finished in second place overall just behind Alex Croak, and won three of the four individual apparatus titles. This event doubled as the first selection trial for the Commonwealth Games team, and after a month-long selection camp at the Australian Institute of Sport (AIS) in Canberra, Slater was named in her second Commonwealth Team. At the games, Australia won the team title by almost four points. Slater won four individual medals and returned home as one of the most successful Australian team members. Slater was then selected as Australia's only representative for the 2002 World Artistic Gymnastics Championships after winning five gold medals at the selection trials.

In 2003 at the world championships in Anaheim, Slater led the Australian team to the bronze medal, the first ever won by any Australian female gymnast at this level.

Slater competed in the 2004 Olympic Games in Athens, Greece, where she qualified for the balance beam final, but did not win a medal after a fall from the beam. She retired from gymnastics on 24 August 2005.

== After gymnastics ==
After retirement, Slater has gone on to do some television work in Australia, providing commentary for Australian cable television for some gymnastics events, as well as doing some television presenting work during the Australian coverage of the 2005 World Gymnastics Championships. Slater also had a cameo in the 2006 gymnastics film Stick It. In 2007, Slater took up pistol shooting.

In 2011, she was inducted into the Western Australian Institute of Sport Hall of Champions.

Slater married Scott Penney in 2013; they have a son born in 2019. As of 2020, Slater works as a physiotherapist and a sonographer. Slater also currently serves on the WA Olympic Council.
