= List of Commonwealth Games medallists in gymnastics =

This is the complete list of Commonwealth Games medallists in gymnastics. The sport was first included in 1978, was dropped for 1982 and 1986, and then returned for the Games in 1990. since when it has been held as part of every edition of the Games.

== Men's artistic ==
=== Team ===
Event	Gold		Silver		Bronze	
1978	Canada; Jean Choquette; Nigel Rothwell; Owen Walstrom; Philip Delesalle	165.550	England; Eddie Arnold; Ian Neale; Jeff Davis; Thomas Wilson	161.950	Australia; Lambert Ariens; Lindsay Nylund; Rudolf Starosta; Warwick Forbes	158.500
1990	Canada; Alan Nolet; Claude Latendrese; Curtis Hibbert; Lorne Bobkin	171.800	England; David Cox; James May; Neil Thomas; Terry Bartlett	170.450	Australia; Brennon Dowrick; Kenneth Meredith; Peter Hogan; Tim Lees	169.500
1994	Canada; Alan Nolet; Kris Burley; Richard Ikeda; Travis Romagnoli	164.700	Australia; Brennon Dowrick; Bret Hudson; Nathan Kingston; Peter Hogan	164.500	England; Lee McDermott; Neil Thomas; Paul Bowler; Robert Barber	162.375
1998	England; Andrew Atherton; Craig Heap; John Smethurst; Lee McDermott; Ross Brewer	162.275	Australia; Andrei Kravtsov; Brennon Dowrick; Bret Hudson; Pavel Mamine; Philippe Rizzo	162.150	Canada; Alexander Jeltkov; Grant Golding; Kris Burley; Peter Schmid; Richard Ikeda	155.825
2002	England; Craig Heap; Cuong Thoong; John Smethurst; Kanukai Jackson; Ross Brewer	162.075	Canada; Alexander Jeltkov; David Kikuchi; Grant Golding; Kyle Shewfelt; Richard Ikeda	161.350	Australia; Damian Istria; Dane Smith; Justin Kok Loong Ng; Pavel Mamine; Philippe Rizzo	159.100
2006	Canada; Nathan Gafuik; Grant Golding; David Kikuchi; Kyle Shewfelt; Adam Wong	269.750	Australia; Damian Istria; Joshua Jefferis; Samuel Offord; Philippe Rizzo; Prashanth Sellathurai	268.850	England; Ryan Bradley; Ross Brewer; Luke Folwell; Louis Smith; Kristian Thomas	260.000
2010	Australia; Samuel Offord; Joshua Jefferis; Thomas Pichler; Luke Wiwatowski; Prashanth Sellathurai	259.050	England; Max Whitlock; Luke Folwell; Danny Lawrence; Reiss Beckford; Steve Jehu	256.750	Canada; Jason Scott; Robert Watson; Tariq Dowers; Anderson Loran; Ian Galvan	248.500
2014	England; Sam Oldham; Louis Smith; Kristian Thomas; Max Whitlock; Nile Wilson	266.804	Scotland; Frank Baines; Adam Cox; Liam Davie; Daniel Keatings; Daniel Purvis	257.603	Canada; Zachary Clay; Nathan Gafuik; Anderson Loran; Kevin Lytwyn; Scott Morgan	252.078
2018	England; Courtney Tulloch; Max Whitlock; James Hall; Nile Wilson; Dominick Cunningham	258.950	Canada; Cory Paterson; Jackson Payne; René Cournoyer; Scott Morgan; Zachary Clay	248.650	Scotland; Daniel Purvis; Frank Baines; Hamish Carter; Kelvin Cham; David Weir	240.975
2022	England; Joe Fraser; James Hall; Jake Jarman; Giarnni Regini-Moran; Courtney Tulloch	254.550	Canada; Félix Dolci; Mathys Jalbert; Chris Kaji; Jayson Rampersad; Kenji Tamane	241.200	Cyprus; Georgios Angonas; Michalis Chari; Ilias Georgiou; Marios Georgiou; Sokratis Pilakouris	239.650
2026	Canada; Jordan Carroll; René Cournoyer; Félix Dolci; William Émard; Ethan Ikeda	241.400	England; Gabriel Langton; Joshua Nathan; Adam Tobin; Luke Whitehouse; Alexander Yolshin-Cash	238.250	Australia; Benjamin Foster; Tru Hagens; James Hardy; Ritam Malik; Jesse Moore	235.650

=== All-around ===
Event	Gold		Silver		Bronze	
1978	Philip Delesalle; Canada	56.400	Lindsay Nylund; Australia	54.950	Jean Choquette; Canada	54.250
1990	Curtis Hibbert; Canada	57.950	Alan Nolet; Canada	57.800	James May; England	57.400
1994	Neil Thomas; England	55.950	Brennon Dowrick; Australia	55.525	Peter Hogan; Australia	54.950
1998	Andrei Kravtsov; Australia	54.675	Andrew Atherton; England	54.025	Brennon Dowrick; Australia	52.500
2002	Kanukai Jackson; England	55.025	Philippe Rizzo; Australia	53.850	Alexander Jeltkov; Canada	53.650
2006	Joshua Jefferis; Australia	89.450	Nathan Gafuik; Canada	88.350	Philippe Rizzo; Australia	88.200
2010	Luke Folwell; England	85.550	Reiss Beckford; England	85.450	Joshua Jefferis; Australia	84.750
2014	Max Whitlock; England	90.361	Daniel Keatings; Scotland	88.298	Nile Wilson; England	87.965
2018	Nile Wilson; England	84.950	James Hall; England	83.975	Marios Georgiou; Cyprus	83.750
2022	Jake Jarman; England	83.450	James Hall; England	82.900	Marios Georgiou; Cyprus	81.750
2026	Reuben Ward; Scotland	79.650	Félix Dolci; Canada	79.450	Jesse Moore; Australia	79.000

=== Floor ===
Event	Gold		Silver		Bronze	
1990	Neil Thomas; England	9.750	Alan Nolet; Canada	9.675	Curtis Hibbert; Canada	9.600
1994	Neil Thomas; England	9.662	Kris Burley; Canada	9.437	Alan Nolet; Canada	9.150
1998	Andrei Kravtsov; Australia	9.325	Christian Brezeanu; South Africa	8.950	John Smethurst; England David Phillips; New Zealand	8.737
2002	Kyle Shewfelt; Canada	9.637	Kevin Britton; Canada	9.300	Philippe Rizzo; Australia	9.225
2006	Adam Wong; Canada	14.975	Ng Shu Wai; Malaysia	14.850	Kyle Shewfelt; Canada	14.700
2010	Thomas Pichler; Australia	14.675	Reiss Beckford; England	14.625	Ashish Kumar; India	14.475
2014	Max Whitlock; England	15.533	Scott Morgan; Canada	15.133	David Bishop; New Zealand	14.550
2018	Marios Georgiou; Cyprus	13.966	Scott Morgan; Canada	13.833	Daniel Purvis; Scotland	13.733
2022	Jake Jarman; England	14.666	Félix Dolci; Canada	14.166	Giarnni Regini-Moran; England	13.966
2026	Luke Whitehouse; England	14.566	René Cournoyer; Canada	13.966	James Hardy; Australia	13.433

=== Pommel horse ===
Event	Gold		Silver		Bronze	
1990	Brennon Dowrick; Australia	9.825	Tim Lees; Australia	9.725	James May; England	9.700
1994	Brennon Dowrick; Australia	9.425	Nathan Kingston; Australia	9.400	Richard Ikeda; Canada	9.225
1998	Andrei Kravtsov; Australia	9.487	Richard Ikeda; Canada	9.462	Brennon Dowrick; Australia	9.137
2002	Philippe Rizzo; Australia	9.162	Kanukai Jackson; England	9.087	Loke Yik Siang; Malaysia	9.062
2006	Louis Smith; England	15.775	Prashanth Sellathurai; Australia	15.600	Grant Golding; Canada	14.875
2010	Prashanth Sellathurai; Australia	15.500	Max Whitlock; England	15.125	Jonathan Chan Thuang Tong; Singapore	14.200
2014	Daniel Keatings; Scotland	16.058	Max Whitlock; England	15.966	Louis Smith; England	14.966
2018	Rhys McClenaghan; Northern Ireland	15.100	Max Whitlock; England	15.100	Zachary Clay; Canada	14.300
2022	Joe Fraser; England	14.833	Rhys McClenaghan; Northern Ireland	14.133	Jayson Rampersad; Canada	14.000
2026	Jordan Carroll; Canada	15.000	Reuben Ward; Scotland	14.966	Cameron Lynn; Scotland	13.833

=== Rings ===
Event	Gold		Silver		Bronze	
1990	Curtis Hibbert; Canada	9.775	James May; England	9.750	Ken Meredith; Australia	9.725
1994	Lee McDermott; England	9.475	Peter Hogan; Australia	9.275	Brennon Dowrick; Australia	9.150
1998	Pavel Mamine; Australia	9.337	Andrew Atherton; England	9.325	Athol Myhill; South Africa	9.112
2002	Steve Frew; Scotland Herodotos Giorgallas; Cyprus	9.462	Not awarded		Athol Myhill; South Africa	9.412
2006	Joshua Jefferis; Australia	15.875	Damian Istria; Australia	15.700	Herodotos Giorgallas; Cyprus	15.300
2010	Samuel Offord; Australia	14.825	Luke Folwell; England	14.750	Herodotos Giorgallas; Cyprus	14.650
2014	Scott Morgan; Canada	15.100	Kevin Lytwyn; Canada	14.800	Daniel Purvis; Scotland	14.766
2018	Courtney Tulloch; England	14.833	Nile Wilson; England	14.400	Scott Morgan; Canada	14.000
2022	Courtney Tulloch; England	14.400	Sokratis Pilakouris; Cyprus	14.300	Chris Kaji; Canada	14.266
2026	Félix Dolci; Canada	13.766	William Émard; Canada	13.600	James Hardy; Australia	13.500

=== Vault ===
Event	Gold		Silver		Bronze	
1990	James May; England	9.625	Curtis Hibbert; Canada	9.575	Tim Lees; Australia	9.250
1994	Bret Hudson; Australia	9.375	Kris Burley; Canada	9.312	Neil Thomas; England	9.306
1998	Simon Hutcheon; South Africa	9.537	Christian Brezeanu; South Africa	9.281	Bret Hudson; Australia	9.268
2002	Kyle Shewfelt; Canada	9.443	Kanukai Jackson; England	9.281	Barry Collie; Scotland	9.225
2006	Kyle Shewfelt; Canada	16.337	Nathan Gafuik; Canada	16.112	Samuel Offord; Australia	15.862
2010	Luke Folwell; England	15.762	Ashish Kumar; India	15.312	Ian Galvan; Canada	15.037
2014	Scott Morgan; Canada	14.733	Kristian Thomas; England	14.499	Wah Toon Hoe; Singapore	14.195
2018	Christopher Remkes; Australia	14.799	Courtney Tulloch; England	14.666	Dominick Cunningham; England	14.333
2022	Jake Jarman; England	14.916	Giarnni Regini-Moran; England	14.633	James Bacueti; Australia	14.283
2026	Félix Dolci; Canada	13.766	Luke Whitehouse; England	13.749	Neofytos Kyriakou; Cyprus	13.733

=== Parallel bars ===
Event	Gold		Silver		Bronze	
1990	Curtis Hibbert; Canada	9.800	Ken Meredith; Australia	9.675	Peter Hogan; Australia	9.600
1994	Peter Hogan; Australia	9.400	Kris Burley; Canada	9.350	Brennon Dowrick; Australia	9.250
1998	Andrei Kravtsov; Australia	9.637	Richard Ikeda; Canada	9.112	Bret Hudson; Australia	8.887
2002	Philippe Rizzo; Australia	9.375	David Kikuchi; Canada	9.150	John Smethurst; England	9.112
2006	Grant Golding; Canada	15.450	Philippe Rizzo; Australia	15.275	Joshua Jefferis; Australia	14.800
2010	Joshua Jefferis; Australia	14.625	Luke Folwell; England	14.200	Prashanth Sellathurai; Australia	14.000
2014	Daniel Purvis; Scotland	15.533	Nile Wilson; England	15.433	Max Whitlock; England	15.066
2018	Marios Georgiou; Cyprus	14.533	Nile Wilson; England	14.533	Frank Baines; Scotland	14.400
2022	Joe Fraser; England	15.000	Giarnni Regini-Moran; England	14.733	Marios Georgiou; Cyprus	14.533
2026	Jesse Moore; Australia	14.000	Marios Georgiou; Cyprus	13.800	Félix Dolci; Canada	13.300

=== Horizontal bar ===
Event	Gold		Silver		Bronze	
1990	Curtis Hibbert; Canada Alan Nolet; Canada	9.850	Not awarded		Brennon Dowrick; Australia	9.800
1994	Alan Nolet; Canada	9.512	Richard Ikeda; Canada	9.500	Nathan Kingston; Australia	9.325
1998	Alexander Jeltkov; Canada	9.425	Kris Burley; Canada	9.000	Lee McDermott; England	8.950
2002	Philippe Rizzo; Australia	9.512	Damian Istria; Australia	9.075	David Kikuchi; Canada	8.900
2006	Damian Istria; Australia	15.600	David Eaton; Wales	15.000	Owen Batchelor; England	14.950
2010	Dimitris Krasias; Cyprus	13.900	Anderson Loran; Canada	13.625	Max Whitlock; England	13.575
2014	Nile Wilson; England	14.966	Kristian Thomas; England	14.966	Kevin Lytwyn; Canada	14.866
2018	Nile Wilson; England	14.533	Cory Paterson; Canada James Hall; England	14.000	Not awarded	
2022	Ilias Georgiou; Cyprus	14.466	Tyson Bull; Australia	14.233	Marios Georgiou; Cyprus	14.133
2026	Félix Dolci; Canada	14.233	Marios Georgiou; Cyprus	14.166	William Émard; Canada	13.566

== Women's artistic ==
=== Team ===
Games	Gold		Silver		Bronze	
1978	Canada; Elfi Schlegel; Karen Kelsall; Monica Goermann; Sherry Hawco	113.25	England; Joanna Sime; Karen Robb; Lisa Jackman; Susan Cheesebrough	107.40	New Zealand; Deborah Hurst; Kirsty Durward; Lynette Brake; Rowena Davis	106.35
1990	Canada; Janet Morin; Larissa Lowing; Lori Strong; Stella Umeh	116.784	Australia; Kylie Shadbolt; Lisa Read; Michelle Telfer; Monique Allen	115.272	England; Lisa Elliott; Lisa Grayson; Lorna Mainwaring; Louise Redding	114.046
1994	England; Annika Reeder; Jackie Brady; Karin Szymko; Zita Lusack	114.22	Canada; Jaime Hill; Lisa Simes; Stacey Galloway; Stella Umeh	113.65	Australia; Joanna Hughes; Rebecca Stoyel; Ruth Moniz; Salli Wills	113.62
1998	Australia; Allana Slater; Katarina Frketic; Lisa Skinner; Trudy McIntosh; Zeena McLaughlin	111.408	England; Annika Reeder; Gemma Cuff; Kelly Hackman; Lisa Mason; Melissa Wilcox	110.640	Canada; Crystal Gilmore; Emilie Fournier; Katie Rowland; Lise Leveille; Veronique Leclerc	108.884
2002	Australia; Alex Croak; Allana Slater; Jacqui Dunn; Sarah Lauren; Stephanie Moorhouse	111.325	England; Becky Owen; Beth Tweddle; Katy Lennon; Lizzy Line; Nicola Willis	106.900	Canada; Danielle Hicks; Heather Purnell; Kate Richardson; Kylie Stone; Vanessa Meloche	106.800
2006	Australia; Ashleigh Brennan; Hollie Dykes; Naomi Russell; Monette Russo; Chloe Sims	172.600	England; Imogen Cairns; Shavahn Church; Hannah Clowes; Becky Downie	164.350	Canada; Alyssa Brown; Brittnee Habbib; Elyse Hopfner-Hibbs; Jenna Kerbis; Gael Mackie	162.550
2010	Australia; Emily Little; Ashleigh Brennan; Georgia Bonora; Lauren Mitchell; Georgia Wheeler	163.700	England; Charlotte Lindsley; Laura Edwards; Jocelyn Hunt; Imogen Cairns; Rebecca Wing	158.200	Canada; Gabby May; Cynthia Lemieux-Guillemette; Kristin Klarenbach; Emma Willis; Catherine Dion	154.750
2014	England; Ruby Harrold; Kelly Simm; Hannah Whelan; Claudia Fragapane; Rebecca Downie	167.555	Australia; Georgia-Rose Brown; Larrissa Miller; Lauren Mitchell; Mary-Anne Monckton; Olivia Vivian	161.646	Wales; Elizabeth Beddoe; Georgina Hockenhull; Jessica Hogg; Angel Romaeo; Raer Theaker	160.095
2018	Canada; Ellie Black; Shallon Olsen; Isabela Onyshko; Brittany Rogers; Jade Chrobok	163.075	England; Georgia-Mae Fenton; Lucy Stanhope; Alice Kinsella; Kelly Simm; Taeja James	162.650	Australia; Georgia-Rose Brown; Alexandra Eade; Georgia Godwin; Rianna Mizzen; Emily Whitehead	157.450
2022	England; Ondine Achampong; Georgia-Mae Fenton; Claudia Fragapane; Alice Kinsella; Kelly Simm	161.100	Australia; Romi Brown; Georgia Godwin; Kate McDonald; Breanna Scott; Emily Whitehead	158.000	Canada; Laurie Denommée; Jenna Lalonde; Cassie Lee; Emma Spence; Maya Zonneveld	152.700
2026	Australia; Georgia Godwin; Kate McDonald; Ruby Pass; Breanna Scott; Emily Whitehead	158.400	Canada; Ellie Black; Gabrielle Black; Lia Monica Fontaine; Alyssa Guerrier-Calixte; Lia Redick	157.300	England; Shantae-Eve Amankwaah; Shanna-Kae Grant; Alia Leat; Abigail Martin; Ruby Stacey	154.300

=== All-around ===
Games	Gold		Silver		Bronze	
1978	Elfi Schlegel; Canada	38.250	Monica Goermann; Canada Sherry Hawco; Canada	37.250	Not awarded	
1990	Lori Strong; Canada	38.912	Monique Allen; Australia	38.687	Kylie Shadbolt; Australia	38.499
1994	Stella Umeh; Canada	38.400	Rebecca Stoyel; Australia	38.037	Zita Lusack; England	37.725
1998	Zeena McLaughlin; Australia	37.917	Allana Slater; Australia	37.324	Trudy McIntosh; Australia	36.636
2002	Kate Richardson; Canada	36.750	Beth Tweddle; England	36.387	Allana Slater; Australia	36.362
2006	Chloe Sims; Australia	57.100	Elyse Hopfner-Hibbs; Canada	57.100	Hollie Dykes; Australia	55.800
2010	Lauren Mitchell; Australia	58.200	Emily Little; Australia	55.850	Georgia Bonora; Australia	54.950
2014	Claudia Fragapane; England	56.132	Ruby Harrold; England	55.232	Hannah Whelan; England	54.669
2018	Ellie Black; Canada	54.200	Georgia Godwin; Australia	53.800	Alice Kinsella; England	53.150
2022	Georgia Godwin; Australia	53.550	Ondine Achampong; England	53.000	Emma Spence; Canada	52.350
2026	Ellie Black; Canada	53.050	Breanna Scott; Australia	52.900	Lia Monica Fontaine; Canada	52.800

=== Vault ===
Games	Gold		Silver		Bronze	
1990	Nikki Jenkins; New Zealand	9.712	Lori Strong; Canada	9.643	Monique Allen; Australia	9.506
1994	Stella Umeh; Canada	9.556	Sonia Lawrence; Wales	9.543	Lisa Simes; Canada	9.506
1998	Lisa Mason; England	9.231	Trudy McIntosh; Australia	9.162	Annika Reeder; England	9.124
2002	Allana Slater; Australia	9.262	Alex Croak; Australia	9.099	Vanessa Meloche; Canada	9.093
2006	Imogen Cairns; England	14.325	Alyssa Brown; Canada	14.275	Naomi Russell; Australia	14.137
2010	Imogen Cairns; England	13.775	Jennifer Khwela; South Africa	13.737	Gabby May; Canada	13.712
2014	Claudia Fragapane; England	14.633	Ellie Black; Canada	14.433	Dipa Karmakar; India	14.366
2018	Shallon Olsen; Canada	14.566	Ellie Black; Canada	14.233	Emily Whitehead; Australia	13.849
2022	Georgia Godwin; Australia	13.233	Laurie Denommée; Canada	13.233	Shannon Archer; Scotland	13.083
2026	Lia Monica Fontaine; Canada	14.000	Abigail Martin; England	13.799	Abigail Roper; Wales	13.433

=== Uneven bars ===
Games	Gold		Silver		Bronze	
1990	Monique Allen; Australia	9.875	Lori Strong; Canada	9.850	Michelle Telfer; Australia	9.737
1994	Rebecca Stoyel; Australia	9.525	Stella Umeh; Canada	9.450	Sara Thompson; New Zealand	9.337
1998	Lisa Skinner; Australia	9.612	Veronique Leeleve; Canada	9.550	Zeena McLaughlin; Australia	9.512
2002	Beth Tweddle; England	9.550	Allana Slater; Australia	9.537	Vanessa Meloche; Canada	9.337
2006	Elyse Hopfner-Hibbs; Canada	15.100	Shavahn Church; England	14.875	Monette Russo; Australia	14.850
2010	Lauren Mitchell; Australia	14.150	Georgia Bonora; Australia	13.925	Cynthia Lemieux-Guillemette; Canada	13.350
2014	Becky Downie; England	14.666	Larrissa Miller; Australia	14.566	Ruby Harrold; England	14.366
2018	Georgia-Mae Fenton; England	14.600	Brittany Rogers; Canada	14.200	Georgia Godwin; Australia	13.433
2022	Georgia-Mae Fenton; England	13.900	Georgia Godwin; Australia	13.500	Caitlin Rooskrantz; South Africa	13.433
2026	Kate McDonald; Australia	14.333	Ellie Black; Canada	13.900	Emily Roper; Wales	13.666

=== Balance beam ===
Games	Gold		Silver		Bronze	
1990	Lori Strong; Canada	9.850	Larissa Lowing; Canada	9.762	Kylie Shadbolt; Australia	9.700
1994	Salli Wills; Australia	9.075	Zita Lusack; England	8.987	Ruth Moniz; Australia	8.900
1998	Trudy McIntosh; Australia	9.550	Zeena McLaughlin; Australia	9.375	Lise Leveille; Canada	9.350
2002	Kate Richardson; Canada	9.200	Allana Slater; Australia	9.137	Jacqui Dunn; Australia	8.912
2006	Elyse Hopfner-Hibbs; Canada	14.950	Hollie Dykes; Australia	14.925	Becky Downie; England	14.075
2010	Lauren Mitchell; Australia	14.475	Lim Heem Wei; Singapore	12.825	Cynthia Lemieux-Guillemette; Canada	12.825
2014	Ellie Black; Canada	14.900	Mary-Anne Monckton; Australia	13.666	Georgina Hockenhull; Wales	13.466
2018	Alice Kinsella; England	13.700	Georgia-Rose Brown; Australia	13.066	Kelly Simm; England	13.033
2022	Kate McDonald; Australia	13.466	Georgia Godwin; Australia	13.433	Emma Spence; Canada	13.066
2026	Breanna Scott; Australia	13.933	Amanda Yap; Singapore	13.233	Lia Monica Fontaine; Canada	13.000

=== Floor ===
Games	Gold		Silver		Bronze	
1990	Lori Strong; Canada	9.887	Larissa Lowing; Canada	9.762	Kylie Shadbolt; Australia	9.675
1994	Annika Reeder; England	9.750	Jackie Brady; England	9.662	Lisa Simes; Canada	9.550
1998	Annika Reeder; England	9.675	Allana Slater; Australia	9.587	Zeena McLaughlin; Australia	9.487
2002	Sarah Lauren; Australia	9.412	Becky Owen; England	9.237	Kylie Stone; Canada	9.212
2006	Hollie Dykes; Australia	14.650	Ashleigh Brennan; Australia	13.925	Francki van Rooyen; South Africa	13.900
2010	Imogen Cairns; England	14.200	Lauren Mitchell; Australia	13.925	Ashleigh Brennan; Australia	13.425
2014	Claudia Fragapane; England	14.541	Lauren Mitchell; Australia	13.833	Ellie Black; Canada	13.666
2018	Alexandra Eade; Australia	13.333	Latalia Bevan; Wales	13.300	Shallon Olsen; Canada	13.266
2022	Alice Kinsella; England	13.366	Ondine Achampong; England	13.033	Emily Whitehead; Australia	13.000
2026	Ruby Evans; Wales	13.500	Abigail Martin; England	13.333	Shantae-Eve Amankwaah; England	13.300

== Women's rhythmic ==
=== All-around ===
Games	Gold		Silver		Bronze	
1990	Mary Fuzesi; Canada	37.65	Madonna Gimotea; Canada	37.25	Angela Walker; New Zealand	36.9
1994	Kasumi Takahashi; Australia	36.85	Camille Martens; Canada	36.6	Debbie Southwick; England; Joanne Walker; Scotland	36.35
1998	Erika-Leigh Stirton; Canada		Leigh Marning; Australia		Shaneez Johnston; Australia	
2006	Alexandra Orlando; Canada	54.625	Durratun Nashihin Rosli; Malaysia	50.825	Yana Tsikaridze; Canada	49.575
2010	Naazmi Johnston; Australia		Chrystalleni Trikomiti; Cyprus		Elaine Koon; Malaysia	
2014	Patricia Bezzoubenko; Canada		Frankie Jones; Wales		Laura Halford; Wales	
2018	Diamanto Evripidou; Cyprus		Katherine Uchida; Canada		Amy Kwan; Malaysia	
2022	Marfa Ekimova; England		Anna Sokolova; Cyprus		Alexandra Kiroi-Bogatyreva; Australia	

=== Ball ===
Games	Gold		Silver		Bronze	
1990	Madonna Gimotea; Canada	9.45	Mary Fuzesi; Canada	9.4	Angela Walker; New Zealand	9.25
1994	Kasumi Takahashi; Australia	9.2	Camille Martens; Canada	9	Aicha McKenzie; England Gretchen McLennan; Canada	8.8
2006	Alexandra Orlando; Canada	14.850	Kimberly Mason; Australia	13.875	Chrystal Lim; Malaysia	13.225
2010	Naazmi Johnston; Australia		Elaine Koon; Malaysia		Chrystalleni Trikomiti; Cyprus	
2014	Patricia Bezzoubenko; Canada		Frankie Jones; Wales		Laura Halford; Wales	
2018	Diamanto Evripidou; Cyprus		Koi Sie Yan; Malaysia		Alexandra Kiroi-Bogatyreva; Australia	
2022	Ng Joe Ee; Malaysia		Suzanna Shahbazian; Canada		Anna Sokolova; Cyprus	

=== Hoop ===
Games	Gold		Silver		Bronze	
1990	Mary Fuzesi; Canada	9.4	Madonna Gimotea; Canada	9.2	Raewyn Jack; New Zealand Alitia Sands; England Viva Seifert; England	9.1
1994	Kasumi Takahashi; Australia	9.3	Lindsay Richards; Canada	9.05	Aicha McKenzie; England	8.9
1998	Erika-Leigh Stirton; Canada		Thye Chee Kiat; Malaysia		Leigh Marning; Australia	
2010	Elaine Koon; Malaysia		Frankie Jones; Wales		Chrystalleni Trikomiti; Cyprus	
2014	Patricia Bezzoubenko; Canada		Frankie Jones; Wales		Wong Poh San; Malaysia	
2018	Diamanto Evripidou; Cyprus		Laura Halford; Wales		Amy Kwan; Malaysia	
2022	Gemma Frizelle; Wales		Anna Sokolova; Cyprus		Carmel Kallemaa; Canada	

=== Ribbon ===
Games	Gold		Silver		Bronze	
1990	Mary Fuzesi; Canada	9.4	Madonna Gimotea; Canada	9.3	Raewyn Jack; New Zealand; Viva Seifert; England; Angela Walker; New Zealand	9.2
1994	Kasumi Takahashi; Australia	9.2	Camille Martens; Canada	9.05	Gretchen McLennan; Canada	9
1998	Erika-Leigh Stirton; Canada		Shaneez Johnston; Australia		Carolyn Au Yong; Malaysia	
2006	Alexandra Orlando; Canada	13.775	Yana Tsikaridze; Canada	12.500	Chrystal Lim; Malaysia	12.350
2010	Chrystalleni Trikomiti; Cyprus		Naazmi Johnston; Australia		Elaine Koon; Malaysia	
2014	Frankie Jones; Wales		Wong Poh San; Malaysia		Patricia Bezzoubenko; Canada	
2018	Amy Kwan; Malaysia		Diamanto Evripidou; Cyprus		Koi Sie Yan; Malaysia	
2022	Ng Joe Ee; Malaysia		Louise Christie; Scotland		Carmel Kallemaa; Canada	

=== Rope ===
Games	Gold		Silver		Bronze	
1990	Angela Walker; New Zealand	9.3	Madonna Gimotea; Canada	9.275	Mary Fuzesi; Canada	9.25
1998	Erika-Leigh Stirton; Canada		Leigh Marning; Australia		Thye Chee Kiat; Malaysia	
2006	Alexandra Orlando; Canada	13.575	Durratun Nashihin Rosli; Malaysia	13.250	Yana Tsikaridze; Canada	12.500
2010	Chrystalleni Trikomiti; Cyprus		Naazmi Johnston; Australia		Elaine Koon; Malaysia	

=== Clubs ===
Games	Gold		Silver		Bronze	
1994	Kasumi Takahashi; Australia	9.4	Camille Martens; Canada	9.15	Leigh Marning; Australia	9
1998	Erika-Leigh Stirton; Canada		Shaneez Johnston; Australia		Emilie Livingston; Canada	
2006	Alexandra Orlando; Canada	14.200	Durratun Nashihin Rosli; Malaysia	13.475	Kimberly Mason; Australia	12.825
2014	Patricia Bezzoubenko; Canada		Frankie Jones; Wales		Themida Christodoulidou; Cyprus	
2018	Sophie Crane; Canada		Koi Sie Yan; Malaysia		Diamanto Evripidou; Cyprus	
2022	Alexandra Kiroi-Bogatyreva; Australia		Carmel Kallemaa; Canada		Izzah Amzan; Malaysia	

=== Team ===
Games	Gold		Silver		Bronze	
1994	Canada; Camille Martens; Gretchen McLennan; Lindsay Richards	106.9	Australia; Kasumi Takahashi; Katie Mitchell; Leigh Marning	105.3	England; Aicha McKenzie; Debbie Southwick; Linda Southwick	103.3
1998	Malaysia; Carolyn Au-Yong; Chee Kiat Thye; El Regina Tajudin; Sarina Sundara Rajah		Canada; Emilie Livingston; Erika-Leigh Stirton; Katie Iafolla		Australia; Danielle Le Ray; Kristy Darrah; Leigh Marning; Shaneez Johnston	
2006	Canada; Carly Orava; Alexandra Orlando; Yana Tsikaridze		Malaysia; Foong Seow Ting; Chrystal Lim; Durratun Nashihin Rosli		Australia; Naazmi Johnston; Amanda Lee See; Kimberly Mason	
2010	Australia; Naazmi Johnston; Janine Murray; Danielle Prince		Canada; Mariam Chamilova; Demetra Mantcheva; Alexandra Martincek		England; Rachel Ennis; Francesca Fox; Lynne Hutchison	
2014	Canada; Annabelle Kovacs; Maria Kitkarska; Patricia Bezzoubenko		Wales; Nikara Jenkins; Frankie Jones; Laura Halford		Malaysia; Fatin Zakirah Zain Jalany; Wong Poh San; Amy Kwan	
2018	Cyprus; Diamanto Evripidou; Eleni Ellina; Viktoria Skittidi		Malaysia; Amy Kwan; Koi Sie Yan; Izzah Amzan		Australia; Enid Sung; Danielle Prince; Alexandra Kiroi-Bogatyreva	
2022	Canada; Tatiana Cocsanova; Carmel Kallemaa; Suzanna Shahbazian		Australia; Ashari Gill; Lidiia Iakovleva; Alexandra Kiroi-Bogatyreva		England; Marfa Ekimova; Alice Leaper; Saffron Severn	
