= Gymnastics at the 1998 Commonwealth Games =

- Venue: Putra Indoor Stadium
- Location: Kuala Lumpur, Malaysia
- Dates: 11 to 21 September 1998

Gymnastics at the 1998 Commonwealth Games was the fourth appearance of Gymnastics at the Commonwealth Games and the third appearance of Rhythmic gymnastics. The events were held in Kuala Lumpur, Malaysia, from 11 to 21 September 1998 and featured 14 artistic disciplines and 6 rhythmic disciplines for a total of 20 events.

The gymnastics events were held at the Putra Indoor Stadium part of the Bukit Jalil National Sports Complex.

Australia topped the gymnastics medal table by virtue of winning nine gold medals.

Putra Indoor Stadium exterior in 2022

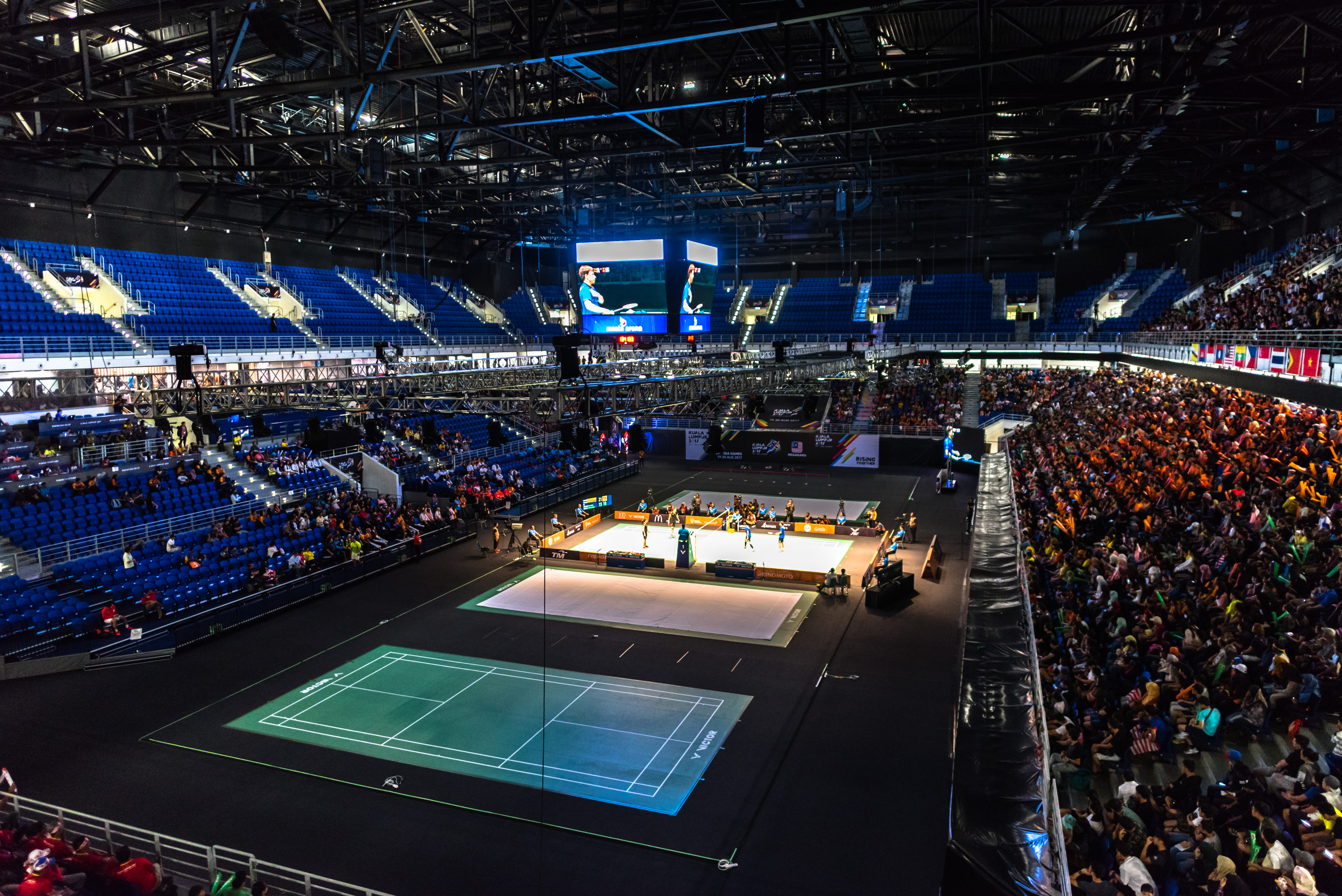
The interior in 2017

== Medal table ==
* Host nation (Malaysia)

Medals won by nation with totals, ranked by number of golds—sortable
Rank	Nation	Gold	Silver	Bronze	Total
1	Australia	9	9	10	28
2	Canada	6	5	4	15
3	England	3	3	3	9
4	South Africa	1	2	1	4
5	Malaysia*	1	1	2	4
Totals (5 entries)		20	20	20	60

== Medallists ==
=== Artistic gymastics ===
Men's events

Event	Gold	Silver	Bronze
Team event	England; Andrew Atherton; Craig Heap; John Smethurst; Lee McDermott; Ross Brewer	Australia; Andrei Kravtsov; Brennon Dowrick; Bret Hudson; Pavel Mamine; Philippe Rizzo	Canada; Alexander Jeltkov; Grant Golding; Kristan Burley; Peter Schmid; Richard Ikeda
All-around	Andrei Kravtsov; Australia	Andrew Atherton; England	Brennon Dowrick; Australia
Floor	Andrei Kravtsov; Australia	Christian Brezeanu; South Africa	John Smethurst; England; David Phillips; New Zealand
Pommel horse	Andrei Kravtsov; Australia	Richard Ikeda; Canada	Brennon Dowrick; Australia
Rings	Pavel Mamine; Australia	Andrew Atherton; England	Athol Myhill; South Africa
Vault	Simon Hutcheon; South Africa	Christian Brezeanu; South Africa	Bret Hudson; Australia
Parallel bars	Andrei Kravtsov; Australia	Richard Ikeda; Canada	Bret Hudson; Australia
Horizontal bar	Alexander Jeltkov; Canada	Kris Burley; Canada	Lee McDermott; England

Women's events

Event	Gold	Silver	Bronze
Team event	Australia; Allana Slater; Katarina Frketic; Lisa Skinner; Trudy McIntosh; Zeena McLaughlin	England; Annika Reeder; Gemma Cuff; Kelly Hackman; Lisa Mason; Melissa Wilcox	Canada; Crystal Gilmore; Emilie Fournier; Katie Rowland; Lise Leveille; Veronique Leclerc
All-around	Zeena McLaughlin; Australia	Allana Slater; Australia	Trudy McIntosh; Australia
Vault	Lisa Mason; England	Trudy McIntosh; Australia	Annika Reeder; England
Uneven bars	Lisa Skinner; Australia	Veronique Leclerc; Canada	Zeena McLaughlin; Australia
Balance beam	Trudy McIntosh; Australia	Zeena McLaughlin; Australia	Lise Leveille; Canada
Floor	Annika Reeder; England	Allana Slater; Australia	Zeena McLaughlin; Australia

=== Rhythmic gymastics ===
Event	Gold	Silver	Bronze
Clubs	Erika-Leigh Stirton; Canada	Shaneez Johnston; Australia	Emilie Livingston; Canada
Hoop	Erika-Leigh Stirton; Canada	Thye Chee Kiat; Malaysia	Leigh Marning; Australia
Ribbon	Erika-Leigh Stirton; Canada	Shaneez Johnston; Australia	Carolyn Au Yong; Malaysia
Rope	Erika-Leigh Stirton; Canada	Leigh Marning; Australia	Thye Chee Kiat; Malaysia
All-around	Erika-Leigh Stirton; Canada	Leigh Marning; Australia	Shaneez Johnston; Australia
Team	Malaysia; Carolyn Au-Yong; Chee Kiat Thye; El Regina Tajudin; Sarina Sundara Rajah	Canada; Emilie Livingston; Erika-Leigh Stirton; Katie Iafolla	Australia; Danielle Le Ray; Kristy Darrah; Leigh Marning; Shaneez Johnston

== Men's artistic results ==
=== Team ===
RANK	TEAM	SCORE
1st place, gold medalist(s)	England; Andrew Atherton; Ross Brewer; Craig Heap; Lee McDermott; John Smethurst	162.275
2nd place, silver medalist(s)	Australia; Brennon Dowrick; Bret Hudson; Andrei Kravtsov; Pavel Mamine; Philippe Rizzo	162.150
3rd place, bronze medalist(s)	Canada; Kristan Burley; Grant Golding; Richard Ikeda; Alexander Jeltkov; Peter Schmid	155.825
4.	South Africa	152.025
5.	Malaysia	147.075
6.	New Zealand	145.325
7.	Wales	145.075
8.	Scotland	143.675

=== All-around ===
RANK	GYMNAST	SCORE
1st place, gold medalist(s)	Andrei Kravtsov (AUS)	54.675
2nd place, silver medalist(s)	Andrew Atherton (ENG)	54.025
3rd place, bronze medalist(s)	Brennon Dowrick (AUS)	52.500
4.	Kristan Burley (CAN)	51.750
5.	Alexander Jeltkov (CAN)	51.700
5.	Craig Heap (ENG)	51.700
7.	Peter Schmid (CAN)	51.250
8.	Christian Brezeanu (RSA)	50.225
9.	Jon Mutch (SCO)	49.550
10.	Loke Yik Siang (MAS)	49.475
11.	Dewald Laubscher (RSA)	49.225
12.	Bret Hudson (NZL)	48.850
13.	Paul Morris (WAL)	48.525
14.	Shane Lyons (NZL)	48.500
15.	Steve Frew (SCO)	48.300
16.	Andreas Kousios (CYP)	48.000
17.	Jason Wink (WAL)	47.850
18.	David Eaton (WAL)	47.650
19.	Onn Kwang Tung (MAS)	47.600
20.	Barry Collie (SCO)	47.475
21.	Brendan Wilde (NZL)	46.475
22.	Herodotos Giorgallas (CYP)	46.425
23.	Paul Mikkelson (NZL)	45.750

=== Floor exercise ===
RANK	GYMNAST	SCORE
1st place, gold medalist(s)	Andrei Kravtsov (AUS)	9.325
2nd place, silver medalist(s)	Christian Brezeanu (RSA)	8.950
3rd place, bronze medalist(s)	John Smethurst (ENG)	8.737
3rd place, bronze medalist(s)	David Phillips (NZL)	8.737
5.	Peter Schmid (CAN)	8.725
6.	Loke Yik Siang (MAS)	8.475
7.	Simon Hutcheon (RSA)	8.012
8.	Andrew Atherton (ENG)	7.800

=== Pommel horse ===
RANK	GYMNAST	SCORE
1st place, gold medalist(s)	Andrei Kravtsov (AUS)	9.487
2nd place, silver medalist(s)	Richard Ikeda (CAN)	9.462
3rd place, bronze medalist(s)	Brennon Dowrick (AUS)	9.137
4.	Lee McDermott (ENG)	9.112
5.	Zoltan Erdey (RSA)	9.050
6.	Andrew Atherton (ENG)	8.625
7.	Loke Yik Siang (MAS)	8.425
8.	Christian Brezeanu (RSA)	8.175

=== Rings ===
RANK	GYMNAST	SCORE
1st place, gold medalist(s)	Pavel Mamine (AUS)	9.337
2nd place, silver medalist(s)	Andrew Atherton (ENG)	9.325
3rd place, bronze medalist(s)	Athol Myhill (RSA)	9.112
4.	Bret Hudson (AUS)	8.687
5.	Alexander Jeltkov (CAN)	8.587
6.	Paul Morris (WAL)	8.575
7.	Christian Brezeanu (RSA)	8.162
8.	Lee McDermott (ENG)	7.875

=== Vault ===
RANK	GYMNAST	SCORE
1st place, gold medalist(s)	Simon Hutcheon (RSA)	9.537
2nd place, silver medalist(s)	Christian Brezeanu (RSA)	9.281
3rd place, bronze medalist(s)	Bret Hudson (AUS)	9.268
4.	Kristan Burley (CAN)	9.062
5.	Craig Heap (ENG)	8.962
6.	Herodotos Giorgallas (CYP)	8.800
7.	Andreas Kousios (CYP)	8.793

=== Parallel bars ===
RANK	GYMNAST	SCORE
1st place, gold medalist(s)	Andrei Kravtsov (AUS)	9.637
2nd place, silver medalist(s)	Richard Ikeda (CAN)	9.112
3rd place, bronze medalist(s)	Bret Hudson (AUS)	8.887
4.	Ross Brewer (ENG)	8.837
5.	Andrew Atherton (ENG)	8.462
6.	Zulkarnain Majid (MAS)	8.375
7.	Alexander Jeltkov (CAN)	8.350
8.	David Phillips (NZL)	7.950

=== Horizontal Bar ===
RANK	GYMNAST	SCORE
1st place, gold medalist(s)	Alexander Jeltkov (CAN)	9.425
2nd place, silver medalist(s)	Kristan Burley (CAN)	9.000
3rd place, bronze medalist(s)	Lee McDermott (ENG)	8.950
4.	Andrei Kravtsov (AUS)	8.662
5.	Philippe Rizzo (AUS)	8.525
6.	Yoke Yik Siang (MAS)	8.375
7.	Dewald Laubscher (RSA)	8.175
8.	Craig Heap (ENG)	7.925

== Women's artistic results ==
=== Team ===
RANK	TEAM	SCORE
1st place, gold medalist(s)	Australia; Katarina Frketic; Trudy McIntosh; Zeena McLaughlin; Lisa Skinner; Allana Slater	111.408
2nd place, silver medalist(s)	England; Gemma Cuff; Kelly Hackman; Lisa Mason; Annika Reeder; Melissa Wilcox	110.640
3rd place, bronze medalist(s)	Canada; Emilie Fournier; Crystal Gilmore; Veronique Leclerc; Lise Leveille; Katie Rowland	108.884
4.	Wales	104.383
5.	South Africa	103.027
6.	Northern Ireland	102.085
7.	Malaysia	101.857
8.	New Zealand	101.817
9.	Namibia	90.022
10.	Bermuda	88.222

=== All-around ===
RANK	GYMNAST	SCORE
1st place, gold medalist(s)	Zeena McLaughlin (AUS)	37.917
2nd place, silver medalist(s)	Allana Slater (AUS)	37.324
3rd place, bronze medalist(s)	Trudy McIntosh (AUS)	36.636
4.	Lisa Mason (ENG)	36.285
5.	Emilie Fournier (CAN)	35.936
6.	Laura Robertson (NZL)	35.349
7.	Crystal Gilmore (CAN)	35.262
8.	Annika Reeder (ENG)	35.348
9.	Nadene de Kock (RSA)	34.992
10.	Kelly Hackman (ENG)	34.905
11.	Holly Murdock (NIR)	34.723
12.	Danielle Hart (NZL)	34.430
13.	Natalie Lucitt (WAL)	34.280
14.	Veronique Leclerc (CAN)	34.249
15.	Sonia Lawrence (WAL)	33.860
16.	Janine Mortimer (WAL)	33.805
17.	Au Li Yen (MAS)	33.442
18.	Caroline Demetriou (RSA)	33.305
19.	Zoe Brown (NIR)	33.055
20.	Althea Boon (NZL)	32.824
21.	Laura Dwyer (NIR)	32.175
22.	Ernadia Omar (MAS)	32.017
23.	Hanli Borcherds (RSA)	31.916
24.	Gharde Geldenhuys (NAM)	30.665

=== Vault ===
RANK	GYMNAST	SCORE
1st place, gold medalist(s)	Lisa Mason (ENG)	9.231
2nd place, silver medalist(s)	Trudy McIntosh (AUS)	9.162
3rd place, bronze medalist(s)	Annika Reeder (ENG)	9.124
4.	Sonia Lawrence (WAL)	9.118
5.	Au Li Yen (MAS)	9.056
6.	Lisa Skinner (AUS)	8.943
7.	Holly Murdock (NIR)	8.787
8.	Katie Rowland (CAN)	8.774

=== Uneven bars ===
RANK	GYMNAST	SCORE
1st place, gold medalist(s)	Lisa Skinner (AUS)	9.612
2nd place, silver medalist(s)	Veronique Leclerc (CAN)	9.550
3rd place, bronze medalist(s)	Zeena McLaughlin (AUS)	9.512
4.	Kelly Hackman (ENG)	9.150
5.	Sonia Lawrence (WAL)	9.075
6.	Nadene de Kock (RSA)	8.925
7.	Melissa Wilcox (ENG)	8.287
8.	Janine Mortimer (WAL)	8.125

=== Balance beam ===
RANK	GYMNAST	SCORE
1st place, gold medalist(s)	Trudy McIntosh (AUS)	9.550
2nd place, silver medalist(s)	Zeena McLaughlin (AUS)	9.375
3rd place, bronze medalist(s)	Lise Leveille (CAN)	9.350
4.	Kelly Hackman (ENG)	9.187
5.	Natalie Lucitt (WAL)	9.050
6.	Au Li Yen (MAL)	8.662
7.	Tammy le Roux (RSA)	8.287
8.	Lisa Mason (ENG)	7.025

=== Floor exercise ===
RANK	GYMNAST	SCORE
1st place, gold medalist(s)	Annika Reeder (ENG)	9.675
2nd place, silver medalist(s)	Allana Slater (AUS)	9.587
3rd place, bronze medalist(s)	Zeena McLaughlin (AUS)	9.487
4.	Laura Robertson (NZL)	9.212
5.	Katie Rowland (CAN)	8.837
6.	Au Li Yen (MAL)	8.050
7.	Kelly Hackman (ENG)	7.600
8.	Holly Murdock (NIR)	7.562

== See also ==
- List of Commonwealth Games medallists in gymnastics
