= Gymnastics at the Commonwealth Games =

Gymnastics is one of the sports at the quadrennial Commonwealth Games.

Artistic gymnastics was a core discipline of the Commonwealth Games between 2002 and 2022 and was required by the Commonwealth Games Federation to be included in each games' sporting program. It was first held as a demonstration sport in 1974 before being included in the main programme in 1978. It has appeared at every games since 1990.

Rhythmic gymnastics is an optional discipline and may, or may not, be included in the sporting program of each edition of the Games. It has been included in every edition since its 1990 debut, except the 2002 Games and the forthcoming slimmed-down 2026 Games.

== Editions ==
Games	Year	Host city	Host country	Winner of the medal table	Second in the medal table	Third in the medal table
XI	1978	Edmonton	Canada	Canada	England	Australia
XIV	1990	Auckland	New Zealand	Canada	Australia	England
XV	1994	Victoria	Canada	Australia	Canada	England
XVI	1998	Kuala Lumpur	Malaysia	Australia	Canada	England
XVII	2002	Manchester	England	Australia	Canada	England
XVIII	2006	Melbourne	Australia	Canada	Australia	England
XIX	2010	Delhi	India	Australia	England	Cyprus
XX	2014	Glasgow	Scotland	England	Canada	Scotland
XXI	2018	Gold Coast	Australia	England	Cyprus	Canada
XXII	2022	Birmingham	England	England	Australia	Malaysia
XXIII	2026	Glasgow	Scotland	Canada	Australia	England

== All-time medal table ==
Updated after the 2026 Commonwealth Games

Rank	Nation	Gold	Silver	Bronze	Total
1	Canada	65	58	49	172
2	Australia	55	49	56	160
3	England	46	44	33	123
4	Cyprus	11	7	12	30
5	Malaysia	5	12	14	31
6	Scotland	4	4	9	17
7	Wales	3	10	6	19
8	New Zealand	2	0	9	11
9	South Africa	1	3	4	8
10	Northern Ireland	1	1	0	2
11	Singapore	0	2	2	4
12	India	0	1	2	3
Totals (12 entries)		193	191	196	580

== Most successful Commonwealth Games gymnasts ==
The most successful gymnast in Commonwealth Games history is the Canadian rhythmic gymnast Alexandra Orlando. She is also the only gymnast to have won a clean sweep of every gold in her discipline - artistic or rhythmic - in a single Games since the introduction of individual apparatus to the Games.

The following gymnasts have won 4 or more gold medals at the Commonwealth Games:

	Name	Discipline	Gold	Silver	Bronze	Total	Notes
1.	(Canada) Alexandra Orlando	Rhythmic	6	0	0	6	Most golds won at a single Games in any sport.
2.	(England) Nile Wilson	Artistic	5	3	1	9	Most successful male and artistic gymnast.
3.	(Canada) Curtis Hibbert	Artistic	5	1	1	7	Most successful male gymnast in a single Games.
4=	(Australia) Kasumi Takahashi	Rhythmic	5	1	0	6	
4=	(Canada) Erika-Leigh Stirton	Rhythmic	5	1	0	6	
6.	(Canada) Patricia Bezzoubenko	Rhythmic	5	0	1	6	
7.	(England) Claudia Fragapane	Artistic	5	0	0	5	Most successful female artistic gymnast
8.	(England) Max Whitlock	Artistic	4	4	2	10	Most decorated gymnast
9.	(Canada) Ellie Black	Artistic	4	4	1	9	
10.	(Canada) Félix Dolci	Artistic	4	3	1	8	
11.	(Australia) Lauren Mitchell	Artistic	4	3	0	7	
12.	(Canada) Alan Nolet	Artistic	4	2	1	7	
13.	(Canada) Lori Strong	Artistic	4	2	0	6	
14.	(Australia) Joshua Jefferis	Artistic	4	1	2	7	
15=.	(Cyprus) Diamanto Euripidou	Rhythmic	4	1	1	6	
15=.	(Canada) Kyle Shewfelt	Artistic	4	1	1	6	
17=.	(Australia) Andrei Kravtsov	Artistic	4	1	0	5	
17=.	(England) Courtney Tulloch	Artistic	4	1	0	5	
19.	(England) Jake Jarman	Artistic	4	0	0	4	

== Best results by event and nation ==
Canada is the only nation to have won a gold in every event in the gymnastics program. Of the other two dominant nations in Commonwealth gymnastics, Australia has won gold in every event in the current gymnastics program; only in the rhythmic gymnastics discipline of Rope have they failed to do so, which was discontinued in 1994, and England have won gold in all artistic gymnastic disciplines but only one gold in rhythmic gymnastics. Traditionally Scotland and Cyprus have been successful in artistic gymnastics, while Malaysia and Wales have found medals in rhythmic gymnastics.

Event		AUS	CAN	CYP	ENG	IND	MAS	NIR	NZL	RSA	SCO	SIN	WAL
M A G
M A G	Team	1st place, gold medalist(s)	1st place, gold medalist(s)	3rd place, bronze medalist(s)	1st place, gold medalist(s)						2nd place, silver medalist(s)		
M A G	Individual All-Around	1st place, gold medalist(s)	1st place, gold medalist(s)	3rd place, bronze medalist(s)	1st place, gold medalist(s)						1st place, gold medalist(s)		
M A G	Floor Exercise	1st place, gold medalist(s)	1st place, gold medalist(s)	1st place, gold medalist(s)	1st place, gold medalist(s)	3rd place, bronze medalist(s)	2nd place, silver medalist(s)		3rd place, bronze medalist(s)	2nd place, silver medalist(s)	3rd place, bronze medalist(s)		
M A G	Pommel Horse	1st place, gold medalist(s)	1st place, gold medalist(s)		1st place, gold medalist(s)		3rd place, bronze medalist(s)	1st place, gold medalist(s)			1st place, gold medalist(s)	3rd place, bronze medalist(s)	
M A G	Rings	1st place, gold medalist(s)	1st place, gold medalist(s)	1st place, gold medalist(s)	1st place, gold medalist(s)					3rd place, bronze medalist(s)	1st place, gold medalist(s)		
M A G	Vault	1st place, gold medalist(s)	1st place, gold medalist(s)		1st place, gold medalist(s)	2nd place, silver medalist(s)				1st place, gold medalist(s)	3rd place, bronze medalist(s)	3rd place, bronze medalist(s)	
M A G	Parallel Bars	1st place, gold medalist(s)	1st place, gold medalist(s)	1st place, gold medalist(s)	1st place, gold medalist(s)						1st place, gold medalist(s)		
M A G	Horizontal Bar	1st place, gold medalist(s)	1st place, gold medalist(s)	1st place, gold medalist(s)	1st place, gold medalist(s)								2nd place, silver medalist(s)
W A G
W A G	Team	1st place, gold medalist(s)	1st place, gold medalist(s)		1st place, gold medalist(s)				3rd place, bronze medalist(s)				3rd place, bronze medalist(s)
W A G	Individual All-Around	1st place, gold medalist(s)	1st place, gold medalist(s)		1st place, gold medalist(s)								
W A G	Vault	1st place, gold medalist(s)	1st place, gold medalist(s)		1st place, gold medalist(s)	3rd place, bronze medalist(s)			1st place, gold medalist(s)	2nd place, silver medalist(s)	3rd place, bronze medalist(s)		2nd place, silver medalist(s)
W A G	Uneven Bars	1st place, gold medalist(s)	1st place, gold medalist(s)		1st place, gold medalist(s)				3rd place, bronze medalist(s)	3rd place, bronze medalist(s)			3rd place, bronze medalist(s)
W A G	Balance Beam	1st place, gold medalist(s)	1st place, gold medalist(s)		1st place, gold medalist(s)							2nd place, silver medalist(s)	3rd place, bronze medalist(s)
W A G	Floor Exercise	1st place, gold medalist(s)	1st place, gold medalist(s)		1st place, gold medalist(s)					3rd place, bronze medalist(s)			1st place, gold medalist(s)
R G
R G	Individual All-Around	1st place, gold medalist(s)	1st place, gold medalist(s)	1st place, gold medalist(s)	1st place, gold medalist(s)		2nd place, silver medalist(s)		3rd place, bronze medalist(s)		3rd place, bronze medalist(s)		2nd place, silver medalist(s)
R G	Team	1st place, gold medalist(s)	1st place, gold medalist(s)	1st place, gold medalist(s)	3rd place, bronze medalist(s)		1st place, gold medalist(s)						2nd place, silver medalist(s)
R G	Hoop	1st place, gold medalist(s)	1st place, gold medalist(s)	1st place, gold medalist(s)	3rd place, bronze medalist(s)		1st place, gold medalist(s)		3rd place, bronze medalist(s)				2nd place, silver medalist(s)
R G	Ball	1st place, gold medalist(s)	1st place, gold medalist(s)	1st place, gold medalist(s)	3rd place, bronze medalist(s)		2nd place, silver medalist(s)		3rd place, bronze medalist(s)				2nd place, silver medalist(s)
R G	Clubs	1st place, gold medalist(s)	1st place, gold medalist(s)	3rd place, bronze medalist(s)			2nd place, silver medalist(s)						2nd place, silver medalist(s)
R G	Ribbon	1st place, gold medalist(s)	1st place, gold medalist(s)	1st place, gold medalist(s)	3rd place, bronze medalist(s)		1st place, gold medalist(s)		3rd place, bronze medalist(s)				1st place, gold medalist(s)
R G	Rope	2nd place, silver medalist(s)	1st place, gold medalist(s)	1st place, gold medalist(s)			2nd place, silver medalist(s)		1st place, gold medalist(s)				
