= Gymnastics at the 1999 Pan American Games =

- Gymnastics pictograms
- Venue: Winnipeg Arena
- Start date: July 24, 1999
- End date: July 27, 1999

This page shows the results of the Gymnastics Competition at the 1999 Pan American Games, held from July 24 to July 27 in Winnipeg, Canada.

== Medal summary ==
=== Medal table ===
* Host nation (Canada)

Rank	Nation	Gold	Silver	Bronze	Total
1	Cuba	7	4	3	14
2	Canada*	6	4	3	13
3	United States	1	3	2	6
4	Argentina	1	2	1	4
5	Brazil	1	1	2	4
6	Venezuela	0	1	2	3
7	Colombia	0	1	1	2
8	Puerto Rico	0	0	2	2
Totals (8 entries)		16	16	16	48

=== Artistic gymnastics ===
==== Men ====
Games	Gold	Silver	Bronze
Team all-around	Cuba; Francisco Diaz; Yoandry Diaz; Abel Driggs; Lazaro Lamelas; Erick López; Adonis Vazquez	United States; Michael Ashe; Raj Bhavsar; Michael Dutka; Stephen McCain; Michael Moran; James Young	Canada; Roshan Amendra; Kristan Burley; Grant Golding; Darin Good; Richard Ikeda; Alexander Jeltkov
Individual all-around	Erick López; Cuba	Alexander Jeltkov; Canada	Lazaro Lamelas; Cuba
Floor exercise	Eric Pedercini; Argentina	Yoandry Diaz; Cuba	Victor Solorzano; Venezuela
Pommel horse	Erick López; Cuba	Carycel Briceno; Venezuela	Jorge Giraldo; Colombia
Rings	Erick López; Cuba	Sergio Alvarino; Argentina	Diego Lizardi; Puerto Rico
Vault	Abel Driggs; Cuba	Yoandry Diaz; Cuba	Kristan Burley; Canada
Parallel bars	Erick López; Cuba	Jorge Giraldo; Colombia	Abel Driggs; Cuba
Horizontal bar	Alexander Jeltkov; Canada	Erick López; Cuba	Luis Vargas Velásquez; Puerto Rico

==== Women ====
Games	Gold	Silver	Bronze
Team all-around	Canada; Julie Beaulieu; Michelle Conway; Émilie Fournier; Lise Leveille; Kate Richardson; Yvonne Tousek	United States; Jeanette Antolin; Alyssa Beckerman; Jamie Dantzscher; Erinn Dooley; Jennie Thompson; Morgan White	Brazil; Patricia Aoki; Heine Araujo; Camila Comin; Marília Gomes; Daniele Hypólito; Daiane Dos Santos
Individual all-around	Morgan White; United States	Michelle Conway; Canada	Jennie Thompson; United States
Vault	Azaray Jova; Cuba	Daiane Dos Santos; Brazil	Eddylin Zabaleta; Venezuela
Uneven bars	Yvonne Tousek; Canada	Julie Beaulieu; Canada	Morgan White; United States
Balance beam	Lise Leveille; Canada	Barbara Rivarola; Argentina	Melina Sirolli; Argentina
Floor exercise	Yvonne Tousek; Canada	Michelle Conway; Canada	Daiane Dos Santos; Brazil

== Artistic gymnastics ==
=== Men's competition ===
All-Around

- Held on 1999-07-25

RANK	FINAL RANKING	SCORE
Gold medal	Eric López (CUB)	56.725
Silver medal	Alexander Jeltkov (CAN)	55.000
Bronze medal	Lázaro Lamelas (CUB)	54.950

Floor Exercise

- Held on 1999-07-27

RANK	FINAL RANKING	SCORE
Gold medal	Eric Pedercini (ARG)	9.400
Silver medal	Yoandry Díaz (CUB)	9.350
Bronze medal	Víctor Solorzano (VEN)	9.050
4.	Martin Barrionuevo (ARG)	8.900
5.	Michael Dutka (USA)	8.875
6.	Darin Good (CAN)	8.700
7.	Raj Bhavsar (USA)	8.500
8.	Lázaro Lamelas (CUB)	8.200

Parallel Bars

- Held on 1999-07-27

RANK	FINAL RANKING	SCORE
Gold medal	Eric López (CUB)	9.550
Silver medal	Jorge Giraldo (COL)	9.525
Bronze medal	Abel Driggs (CUB)	9.300
4.	Luis Vargas (PUR)	9.275
5.	Kris Burley (CAN)	9.200
6.	Grant Golding (CAN)	9.150
7.	Michael Dutka (USA)	8.875
8.	Stephen McCain (USA)	8.675

Pommel Horse

- Held on 1999-07-27

RANK	FINAL RANKING	SCORE
Gold medal	Eric López (CUB)	9.700
Silver medal	Carycel Briceño (VEN)	9.450
Bronze medal	Jorge Giraldo (COL)	9.350
4.	Richard Ikeda (CAN)	9.300
5.	Lázaro Lamelas (CUB)	9.250
6.	Michael Dutka (USA)	9.050
7.	Raj Bhavsar (USA)	8.850
8.	Gustavo Barreto (BRA)	7.750

Rings

- Held on 1999-07-27

RANK	FINAL RANKING	SCORE
Gold medal	Eric López (CUB)	9.650
Silver medal	Sergio Alvario (ARG)	9.500
Bronze medal	Diego Lizardi (PUR)	9.475
4.	Francisco Díaz (CUB)	9.450
5.	Stephen McCain (USA)	9.425
6.	Kleber Sato (BRA)	9.375
7.	Jesus Pacheco (VEN)	9.300
8.	Juan Ortíz (PUR)	9.050

Horizontal Bar

- Held on 1999-07-27

RANK	FINAL RANKING	SCORE
Gold medal	Alexander Jeltkov (CAN)	9.700
Silver medal	Eric López (CUB)	9.450
Bronze medal	Luis Vargas (PUR)	9.400
4.	Carycel Briceño (VEN)	9.350
5.	Jorge Giraldo (COL)	9.200
6.	Francisco López (MEX)	9.000
7.	Roshan Amendra (CAN)	8.850
8.	Lázaro Lamelas (CUB)	8.800

Vault

- Held on 1999-07-27

RANK	FINAL RANKING	SCORE
Gold medal	Abel Driggs (CUB)	9.587
Silver medal	Yoandry Díaz (CUB)	9.537
Bronze medal	Kris Burley (CAN)	9.475
4.	Pablo Capote (VEN)	9.275
5.	Eric Pedercini (ARG)	9.212
6.	Michael Dutka (USA)	9.200
7.	Michel Conceição (BRA)	9.012
8.	Roshan Amendra (CAN)	8.800

Team

- Held on 1999-07-24

RANK	FINAL RANKING	SCORE
Gold medal	Cuba	222.375
Silver medal	United States	216.000
Bronze medal	Canada	215.150
4.	Venezuela	207.625
5.	Argentina	204.825
6.	Puerto Rico	204.400
7.	Brazil	202.925

=== Women's competition ===
All-Around

- Held on 1999-07-25

RANK	FINAL RANKING	SCORE
Gold medal	Morgan White (USA)	37.649
Silver medal	Michelle Conway (CAN)	37.618
Bronze medal	Jennie Thompson (USA)	37.609

Floor Exercise

- Held on 1999-07-27

RANK	FINAL RANKING	SCORE
Gold medal	Yvonne Tousek (CAN)	9.712
Silver medal	Michelle Conway (CAN)	9.687
Bronze medal	Daiane dos Santos (BRA)	9.612
4.	Morgan White (USA)	9.562
5.	Jamie Dantzscher (USA)	9.425
6.	Barbara Rivarola (ARG)	9.337
7.	Eddylin Zabaleta (VEN)	8.675
8.	Jessica López (VEN)	8.312

Uneven Bars

- Held on 1999-07-27

RANK	FINAL RANKING	SCORE
Gold medal	Yvonne Tousek (CAN)	9.662
Silver medal	Julie Beaulieu (CAN)	9.600
Bronze medal	Morgan White (USA)	9.537
4.	Melina Sirolli (ARG)	9.500
5.	Marília Gomes (BRA)	9.487
6.	Barbara Rivarola (ARG)	9.262
7.	Melissa Cesar (VEN)	9.262

Balance Beam

- Held on 1999-07-27

RANK	FINAL RANKING	SCORE
Gold medal	Lise Leveille (CAN)	9.612
Silver medal	Barbara Rivarola (ARG)	9.512
Bronze medal	Melina Sirolli (ARG)	9.387
4.	Marília Gomes (BRA)	9.100
5.	Yvonne Tousek (CAN)	9.000
6.	Melissa Cesar (VEN)	8.725
7.	Jamie Dantzscher (USA)	8.700
8.	Arlen Lovera (VEN)	8.537

Vault

- Held on 1999-07-27

RANK	FINAL RANKING	SCORE
Gold medal	Arazay Jova (CUB)	9.450
Silver medal	Daiane dos Santos (BRA)	9.387
Bronze medal	Eddylin Zabaleta (VEN)	9.231
4.	Denisse López (MEX)	9.206
5.	Morgan White (USA)	8.993
6.	Yureysis Bermudez (CUB)	8.950
7.	Daniele Hypólito (BRA)	8.756
8.	Jennie Thompson (USA)	8.293

Team

- Held on 1999-07-24

RANK	FINAL RANKING	SCORE
Gold medal	Canada	148.944
Silver medal	United States	148.364
Bronze medal	Brazil	147.639
4.	Venezuela	144.019
5.	Cuba	143.796
6.	Argentina	142.977
7.	Chile	131.656
8.	Bermuda	114.658

== Rhythmic gymnastics ==
Event	Gold	Silver	Bronze
Group all-around	Brazil; Juliana Coradine; Flávia de Faria; Alessandra Ferezin; Camila Ferezin; Dayane Camilo; Michelle Salzano	Cuba	Canada
Individual all-around	Emilie Livingston (CAN)	Jessica Howard (USA)	Yordania Corrales (CUB)

== See also ==
- Pan American Gymnastics Championships
- South American Gymnastics Championships
- Gymnastics at the 2000 Summer Olympics
