= Warwick Forbes =

Australian gymnast

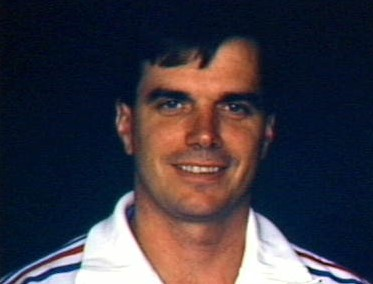
- Forbes in 1991

Personal information
- Born: 10 December 1951 (age 74)

Gymnastics career
- Discipline: Men's artistic gymnastics
- Country represented: Australia
Medal record
Men's artistic gymnastics
Representing Australia
Commonwealth Games
| Bronze medal – third place | 1978 Edmonton | Team |

Warwick Ian Forbes OAM (born 10 December 1951 in Sydney) is a former Australian men's gymnast and national gymnastics coach. He was the head coach of the Australian Men's Artistic Team and Australian Institute of Sport Men's Artistic Gymnastics program from 1983 to 2004.

== Gymnastics career ==
Forbes commenced his gymnastics career at the Sydney YMCA. Forbes moved to Germany in 1971 to be coached by Lazslo Szakacsi, a previous Hungarian coach in Australia. After failing to qualify for the Australian team at the 1972 Munich Olympics team, he remained in Germany to study and train at the Deutsche Turnschule in Frankfurt. In 1975, he moved to Perth, Western Australia, where he commenced a bachelor's degree in Human Biology and Anatomy at the University of Western Australia but in 1976 changed to Physical Education to continue his interest in exercise physiology and biomechanics. He failed to qualify for the Australian team at the 1976 Montreal Olympics team. In September 1977, he was awarded at scholarship at the University of California, Berkeley and he competed for the University of California Berkeley in the NCAA circuit from 1977 to 1979 and part of 1980. He completed a master's degree in 1981 in Kinesiology and Neuromotor Control. Whilst at the university, and after completing his NCAA competitive eligibility, he worked as an assistant coach and an academic teaching assistant.

Forbes was an Australian men's gymnastics team member from 1975 to 1980 and during this period he represented Australia at the 1977 Summer Universiade in Sofia, Bulgaria, 1978 World Artistic Gymnastics Championships in Strasbourg, France, 1979 Summer Universiade in Mexico City and 1979 World Artistic Gymnastics Championships in Fort Worth, Texas. At the 1978 Commonwealth Games in Edmonton, Canada, he won a bronze medal in the men's team competition.

== Coaching career ==
From 1981 to 1982, Forbes was employed as a senior tutor in biomechanics and exercise physiology at the Footscray Institute of Technology when approached to take over from Peter Lloyd as head coach of the Australian Institute of Sport Men's Artistic Gymnastics program. Forbes was appointed in 1983 and held this position until 2004. In addition, from 1983 to 2004, he was Gymnastics Australia National Men's Artistic Gymnastics Head Coach.

Australian Team's performances at major competitions whilst Forbes was head coach were:

- 1981 World Artistic Gymnastics Championships – assistant coach
- 1983 Appointed National Men's Artistic Gymnastics head coach
- 1983 World Artistic Gymnastics Championships – 23rd in team competition.
- 1984 Los Angeles Olympics – Werner Birnbaum 43rd in individual all-round; Robert Edmonds 68th in individual all-round
- 1985 World Artistic Gymnastics Championships – 20th in team competition.
- 1986 Commonwealth Gymnastic Federation Championships – 3rd in team competition.
- 1987 World Artistic Gymnastics Championships – 21st in team competition.
- 1988 Seoul Olympics – Ken Meredith finished 80th in individual all-round.
- 1989 World Artistic Gymnastics Championships – 19th in team competition.
- 1990 Commonwealth Games – Brennon Dowrick won an individual gold medal on the Pommel Horse; also team two silver and four bronze medals.
- 1991 World Artistic Gymnastics Championships – three athletes competed
- 1992 World Artistic Gymnastics Championships – apparatus finals only with Brennon Dowrick 16th in rings
- 1992 Barcelona Olympics – Brennon Dowrick was Australia's sole male representative finishing 61st in individual all-round.
- 1993 World Artistic Gymnastics Championships
- 1994 Commonwealth Games – 2nd in team competition. Peter Hogan won gold on the parallel bars, Bret Hudson won the gold medal in the vault and Brennon Dowrick won gold on the pommel horse and was second in the all-round competition. Totals medals – three gold, three silver and four bronze medals.
- 1994 World Artistic Gymnastics Championships – individual championships with six athletes.
- 1995 World Artistic Gymnastics Championships – 16th in team competition which was the best ever placing for Australia. All of the men selected were AIS athletes: Bret Hudson, Andrei Kravtsov, Brendan Mand, Peter Hogan, Brennon Dowrick, Nathan Kingston and Damian Crozier, Andrei Kravstov was placed 27th in the individual all round competition, this being the best result ever for the Australian men.
- 1996 Atlanta Olympics – Brennon Dowrick was 35th and Bret Hudson 51st in the individual all-round competed; Andrei Kravtsov injured prior to competition.
- 1997 World Artistic Gymnastics Championships – 18th in team competition; Andrei Kratsov 19th individual all -round.
- 1998 Commonwealth Games – 2nd in team competition; Andrei Kravtsov won five gold medals and Pavel Mamim one gold medal. In addition, team won one silver and four bronze medals.
- 1999 World Artistic Gymnastics Championships – 15th in team competition which was Australia's best ever result and missed finishing in top 12 by three points; Andrei Kratsov made the individual all-round final.
- 2000 Sydney Olympics – Philippe Rizzo finished 44th and Damian Istria in 47th in the individual all-round.

Gymnasts coached by Forbes at the Australian Institute of Sport include: Robbie Edmonds, Ken Meredith, Werner Birnbaum, Brennon Dowrick, Shaw Bing, Peter Hogan, Bret Hudson, Andrei Kravtsov and Philippe Rizzo,

Rizzo under the individual coaching of Vladmir Vatkin went on to win the Silver Medal on the Horizontal bar at the 2001 World Artistic Gymnastics Championships in Ghent, Belgium and the Gold Medal on the Horizontal bar at the 2006 World Artistic Gymnastics Championships in Aahus, Denmark.

== Sports administration ==
After retiring as a gymnastics coach in 2004, Forbes has held several high performance sport management positions with the Australia Institute of Sport, including managing from 2007 to 2011 the final negotiations with the province of Varese, the construction of the building and staffing and running of the Australian Institute of Sport, European Training Centre (AIS-ETC) in Varese, Italy. In 2014 he returned to the AIS-ETC a head of AIS Europe and director of the ETC.

== Recognition ==
- 1984 – Gymnastics Australia Coach of The Year
- 1994 – Gymnastics Australia Coach of The Year
- 1995 – Medal of the Order of Australia in recognition of service to the sport of gymnastics.
- 2000 – Australian Sports Medal
- Gymnastics Australia Hall of Fame – for National Coach/AIS head coach 1983–2004 and 10 years outstanding service dedicated to developing and improving Australia's international ranking.
