= Melissa Wilcox =

Melissa Wilcox may refer to:

- Melissa Wilcox, character in List of Scooby-Doo, Where Are You! episodes
- Melissa Wilcox (gymnast) in 1998 Commonwealth Games
- Melissa M. Wilcox, professor in Religious Studies at UC Riverside, see Scientology and sexual orientation
