= Ross Brewer =

Ross Brewer may refer to:

- Ross Brewer (footballer), Australian footballer
- Ross Brewer (gymnast), English gymnast
