= Ryan Bradley (disambiguation) =

Ryan Bradley may refer to:

- Ryan Bradley (born 1983), American ice skater
- Ryan Bradley (baseball) (born 1975), American baseball player
- Ryan Bradley (Gaelic footballer) (born 1985), Irish footballer
- Ryan Bradley (gymnast), English gymnast
