= Lyn Carpenter =

English Netball volunteer

Personal information
- Nationality: English
- Born: 30 November 1965 (age 60)

Sport
- Sport: Netball
Medal record
Athletics
Representing England
Commonwealth Games
Bronze medal – third place	1998 Kuala Lumpur	team

Lyn Carpenter (born 1965) is a sports administrator, retired local government executive and former netball player. Carpernter is currently Director of Europe region of World Netball. Before retiring, her last executive role as Chief Executive of Thurrock Council from 2015 to 2022.

== Netball ==
=== Playing career ===
Carpenter was the oldest player ever to be awarded a debut international cap in the England national netball team, which she received in December 1997 at the age of 32. During her senior international career she amassed 33 international caps, representing England and winning a bronze medal, at the 1998 Commonwealth Games in Kuala Lumpur, Malaysia. She also won a bronze medal at the 1999 Netball World Championships in New Zealand. She also represented Great Britain in basketball at the 1987 World Student Games in Zagreb.

=== Administration career ===
Carpenter served on the Board of England Netball from 2003, latterly as Vice Chairman, until August 2014. She is a former current Chairman of Netball Europe a role she has held until 2019 before being elected as International Netball Federation regional director for Europe.

== Local government career ==
In 2009, Carpenter was appointed to Hammersmith Council as Director of Residents Services. In September 2011 she was appointed to a new Biborough Executive Director role that also included the Royal Borough managing a range of complex universal services. Carpenter was appointed Chief Executive of Thurrock Council in September 2015. She resigned in December 2022 shortly before the council was reported as being "effectively bankrupt". A subsequent inspection report into the situation at Thurrock issued by Essex County Council criticized Carpenter's management style at the Council.
