= Lucy Newcombe =

British field hockey player

Personal information
- Nationality: English
- Born: 1975 (age 50–51) Birmingham, West Midlands

Sport
- Sport: Field Hockey
Medal record
field hockey
Representing England
Commonwealth Games
| Silver medal – second place | 1998 Kuala Lumpur | Team |

Lucy Alexandra Newcombe (born 1975) is a female British former field hockey player.

== Hockey career ==
Newcombe represented England and won a silver medal, at the 1998 Commonwealth Games in Kuala Lumpur.

== Personal life ==
Newcombe served in the Royal Air Force for 17 years and retired with the rank of Wing commander; she was commissioned in 1996.
