= 1994 Junior Pan American Rhythmic Gymnastics Championships =

International sports competition

The 1994 Junior Pan American Rhythmic Gymnastics Championships was held in Monterrey, Mexico, September 20–22, 1994.

== Medal summary ==
Event	Gold	Silver	Bronze
Team	Canada; Erika-Leigh Stirton; Valerie Morelli; Aja Shimizu; Janice Chan	Unknown	Unknown United States; Lauri Illy; Lori Fredrickson; Tina Tharp
Rope	Unknown	Unknown	Lauri Illy (USA)
Clubs	Unknown	Lauri Illy (USA)	Unknown
