= Jackie Empson =

British field hockey player

Personal information
- Nationality: English
- Born: 1974 (age 51–52)

Sport
- Sport: Field Hockey
Medal record
field hockey
Representing England
Commonwealth Games
| Silver medal – second place | 1998 Kuala Lumpur | Team |

Jacqueline 'Jackie' Empson (born 1974) is a female British former field hockey player.

== Hockey career ==
Empson represented England and won a silver medal, at the 1998 Commonwealth Games in Kuala Lumpur.
