= Kasumi Takahashi =

Japanese-Australian rhythmic gymnast

- Born: 6 May 1980 (age 46) Tokyo

Gymnastics career
- Discipline: Rhythmic gymnastics
- Country represented: Australia
- Retired: 1998
Medal record
Representing Australia
Commonwealth Games
Gold medal – first place	1994 Victoria	All-around
Gold medal – first place	1994 Victoria	Ball
Gold medal – first place	1994 Victoria	Rope
Gold medal – first place	1994 Victoria	Clubs
Gold medal – first place	1994 Victoria	Ribbon
Silver medal – second place	1994 Victoria	Team

Kasumi Takahashi (born 6 May 1980) is a Japanese-Australian former individual rhythmic gymnast who lives in Los Angeles, California, United States. She won the all-around and all four event titles at the 1994 Commonwealth Games.

== Early life ==
Takahashi was born to an Australian mother and a Japanese father in Tokyo, Japan. She lived in Sydney and Melbourne for four years of her life before her family moved to the United States for her father's work.

== Career ==
Takahashi began rhythmic gymnastics at age 7. In 1990, she was invited to perform an exhibition at the US Rhythmic Gymnastics National Championships.

At the 1994 Commonwealth Games in Victoria, British Columbia, Canada, Takahashi won all five individual gold medals – ball, rope, clubs, ribbon and the all-around title – and the team silver medal, along with her teammates Leigh Marning and Katie Mitchell. The fact that she represented Australia without having lived there for much of her life was a subject of controversy at the time, which Takahashi described as difficult for her to deal with, as she was born with Australian citizenship and had family who lived there. Her victory was credited with stimulating interest in rhythmic gymnastics in Australia.

She competed at the 1995 World Championships, where she placed 47th. She qualified to compete at the 1996 Summer Olympics but ultimately did not start at the competition due to injuring her back in a training session.

== Post-gymnastics career ==
Takahashi retired from the sport in 1997 after suffering stress fractures in her back. She took nine months off to recover, after which she found it was difficult to return to her previous form.

She went on to earn degrees in political science and international relations, then studied law at the University of Southern California.
