= Lise Leveille =

French Canadian gymnast (born 1982)

- Full name: Lise Annique Leveille
- Born: April 14, 1982 (age 44) Burnaby, British Columbia, Canada
- Height: 1.65 m (5 ft 5 in)

Gymnastics career
- Discipline: Women's artistic gymnastics
- Country represented: Canada
- College team: Stanford University
- Club: Flicka Gymnastics
Medal record
Representing Canada
Pan American Games
Gold medal – first place	1999 Winnipeg	Team
Gold medal – first place	1999 Winnipeg	Balance Beam
Commonwealth Games
Bronze medal – third place	1998 Kuala Lumpur	Team
Bronze medal – third place	1998 Kuala Lumpur	Balance beam

Lise Annique Leveille (born April 14, 1982, in Burnaby, British Columbia) is a French-Canadian gymnast and academic who represented Canada at the 2000 Olympic Games.

She began training in gymnastics at the age of three. She competed at the 1998 Commonwealth Games, winning a bronze medal in the team event. The following year, she won two gold medals at the 1999 Pan American Games, as an individual in the balance beam event and in the team event. She participated at the 1999 World Championships, and the 2000 Olympics.

After graduating from Handsworth Secondary School in North Vancouver, she became part of gymnastics team of Stanford University, where she received her BSc degree in Biomechanical engineering and Human biology. She subsequently obtained her MD degree from Queen's University at Kingston. She furthermore has an MHSc degree and an PhD degree in Neuroscience from the University of British Columbia (UBC). In 2014, she completed her residency in orthopaedic surgery at UBC and became a Fellow of The Royal College of Surgeons of Canada (FRCSC). In August 2014 started a fellowship in pediatric orthopaedic surgery at Texas Scottish Rite Hospital for Children in Dallas, Texas. In 2015, she became staff pediatric orthopaedic surgeon at British Columbia Children's Hospital, specializing in knee and athletic injuries. In 2020, Leveille was appointment as Undergraduate Medical Education Director for Orthopaedics of the University of British Columbia.
