= Lee McDermott =

Lee McDermott may refer to:

- Lee McDermott (Desperate Housewives), a character on the TV series Desperate Housewives
- Lee McDermott (gymnast), British gymnast
