= Alexander Jeltkov =

Canadian artistic gymnast

- Nickname: Sasha
- Born: 25 February 1978 (age 48) Tbilisi, Georgian SSR, Soviet Union
- Height: 5 ft 10 in (178 cm)

Gymnastics career
- Discipline: Men's artistic gymnastics
- Country represented: Canada (1996–2007)
- Club: Centre Sablon, Quebec
- Gym: Loyalist Gymnastics (head coach)
- Retired: 2007
Medal record
Representing Canada
World Championships
Silver medal – second place	1999 Tianjin	Horizontal bar
Commonwealth Games
Gold medal – first place	1998 Kuala Lumpur	Horizontal bar
Silver medal – second place	2002 Manchester	Team
Bronze medal – third place	1998 Kuala Lumpur	Team
Bronze medal – third place	2002 Manchester	All-around
Pan American Games
Gold medal – first place	1999 Winnipeg	Horizontal bar
Silver medal – second place	1999 Winnipeg	All-around
Bronze medal – third place	1999 Winnipeg	Team

Alexander "Sasha" Jeltkov (born 25 February 1978 in Tbilisi) is a Canadian male artistic gymnast. He represented Canada at the 2000 and 2004 Summer Olympics. He is the 1999 World silver medalist on horizontal bar.

== Early life ==
Jeltkov was born in Tbilisi, Georgian SSR in 1978. He began practicing gymnastics when he was five years old. In 1990, at the age of twelve, his family moved to Israel. When he was fourteen, his family moved to Montreal, settling as a refugee family.

== Gymnastics career ==
Jeltkov won the silver medal on the horizontal bar at the 1999 World Championships. He represented Canada at the 2000 and 2004 Olympic Games.
