= Trudy McIntosh =

Australian artistic gymnast

- Born: 30 July 1984 (age 42) Geelong, Victoria, Australia

Gymnastics career
Medal record
Gymnastics
Commonwealth Games
| Gold medal – first place | 1998 Kuala Lumpur | Team |
| Gold medal – first place | 1998 Kuala Lumpur | Beam |
| Silver medal – second place | 1998 Kuala Lumpur | Vault |
| Bronze medal – third place | 1998 Kuala Lumpur | Individual all-around |

Trudy McIntosh (born 30 July 1984) is an Australian artistic gymnast.

McIntosh competed at the 2000 Summer Olympics in Sydney. She also competed at the 1998 Commonwealth Games winning gold medals in the team and beam events, a silver medal in the vault event and a bronze medal in the individual all-around event.
