= John Smethurst =

British gymnast (born 1977)

- Full name: John James Smethurst
- Born: 12 July 1977 (age 49) Middleton, Greater Manchester, England

Gymnastics career
- Discipline: Men's artistic gymnastics
- Country represented: England
Medal record
Men's artistic gymnastics
Representing England
Commonwealth Games
Gold medal – first place	1998 Kuala Lumpur	Team
Gold medal – first place	2002 Manchester	Team
Bronze medal – third place	1998 Kuala Lumpur	Floor
Bronze medal – third place	2002 Manchester	Parallel bars

John James Smethurst (born 12 July 1977) is a male former British gymnast.

== Gymnastics career ==
Smethurst represented England and won a gold medal in the team event and a bronze medal on the floor, at the 1998 Commonwealth Games in Kuala Lumpur, Malaysia. Four years later he repeated the success of winning team gold and secured another bronze in the parallel bars at the 2002 Commonwealth Games in Manchester. He is the head of gymnastics at the City of Manchester Institute of Gymnastics.
