= Gemma Cuff =

British gymnast

Personal information
- Nationality: British
- Born: 7 April 1979 (age 47) Scunthorpe, Lincolnshire

Sport
- Sport: Gymnastics
- Club: Coalville GC; Heathrow GC
Medal record
Gymnastics
Representing England
Commonwealth Games
Silver medal – second place	1998 Kuala Lumpur	team event

Gemma Cuff (born April 7, 1979) is a female former British gymnast.

== Gymnastics career ==
Cuff represented England and won a silver medal in the team event, at the 1998 Commonwealth Games in Kuala Lumpur, Malaysia.

She was the National Junior Gymnast of The Year in 1992 when based with the Coalville Gymnastics Club and was three times winner of the British team title (1995, 1996 and 1997) when with the Heathrow Gymnastics Club.

== Personal life ==
She attended the St David's School, Middlesex and moved to the United States attending Pennsylvania State University.
