= England at the 1998 Commonwealth Games =

- CG code: ENG
- CGA: Commonwealth Games England
- Website: weareengland.org

in Kuala Lumpur, Malaysia
- Competitors: 348
- Flag bearers: Opening: Mark Foster (Swimming); Closing: John Regis (Athletics)
- Officials: 103
- Medals Ranked 2nd: Gold 36 Silver 47 Bronze 52 Total 135

Commonwealth Games appearances (overview)
- 1930; 1934; 1938; 1950; 1954; 1958; 1962; 1966; 1970; 1974; 1978; 1982; 1986; 1990; 1994; 1998; 2002; 2006; 2010; 2014; 2018; 2022; 2026; 2030

England competed at the 1998 Commonwealth Games in Kuala Lumpur, Malaysia, between 11 and 21 September 1998. England were represented by the Commonwealth Games Council for England (CGCE). England joined the Commonwealth of Nations as part of the United Kingdom in 1931.

England finished second in the medal table behind Australia, with 36 gold medals, 47 silver medals and 52 bronze medals.

== Medal table (top three) ==
Rank	Nation	Gold	Silver	Bronze	Total
1	Australia	80	61	57	198
2	England	36	47	53	136
3	Canada	30	31	38	99
Totals (3 entries)		146	139	148	433

== Team ==
=== Athletics ===
Name	Event/s	Medal/s
Onochie Achike	triple jump	1 x gold
Oluwafemi Akinsanya	triple jump	
Keith Anderson	marathon	
Myrtle Augee	shot put	1 x silver
Tracy Axten	discus	
Steve Backley	javelin	1 x silver
Sean Baldock	4 × 400 m relay	1 x silver
Matthew Belsham	pole vault	
Sarah Bentley	10,000m	
Rachael Beverley	hammer	
Anthony Borsumato	400m hurdles	
Kristen Bowditch	5,000m	
Kimberley Braznell	10 km walk	
William Burns	marathon	
Darren Campbell	100m, 4 × 100 m relay	1 x gold
Ben Challenger	high jump	1 x silver
Dwain Chambers	100m, 4 × 100 m relay	1 x gold
Christopher Cheeseman	50 km walk	
Allyn Condon	200m	
Andrea Coore	long jump	
Clova Court	heptathlon	
Keith Cullen	5,000m	
Tasha Danvers	400m hurdles	
Christopher Davidson	long jump	
Victoria Day	4 × 400 m relay	1 x silver
Jared Deacon	4 × 400 m relay	1 x silver
Marlon Devonish	100m, 4 × 100 m relay	1 x gold
Bradley Donkin	800m	
Andi Drake	20 km walk	
Shelley Drew	discus	
Michelle Dunkley	high jump	
Spencer Duval	3,000m steeplechase	
Mark Easton	50 km walk	
Mark Edwards	shot put	
Liz Fairs	100m hurdles	
Donna Fraser	400m, 400m hurdles, 4 × 100 m relay	1 x silver, 1 x bronze
Jason Gardener	4 × 100 m relay	1 x gold
Lynn Gibson	1,500m	
Julian Golding	200m, 4 × 100 m relay	2 x gold
Sally Goldsmith	10,000m	
Julian Golley	triple jump	
Dalton Grant	high jump	1 x gold
Damien Greaves	110m hurdles	
Michelle Griffith	triple jump	
Ashia Hansen	triple jump	1 x gold
Andy Hart	800m	
Paul Head	hammer	
Connie Henry	triple jump	1 x bronze
Mick Hill	javelin	1 x bronze
Steve Hollier	50 km walk	
Kelly Holmes	1500 m	1 x silver
Shelley Holroyd	javelin	
Emma Hornby	pole vault	
Gillian Horovitz	marathon	
Kevin Hughes	pole vault	
Mark Hylton	400m, 4 × 400 m relay	1 x silver
Simmone Jacobs	100m, 200m, 4 × 100 m relay	1 x bronze
Tony Jarrett	110 m hurdles	1 x gold
Gary Jennings	400m hurdles	
Joanne Jennings	high jump	1 x silver
Angela Joiner	10,000m	
Mick Jones	hammer	1 x silver
Susan Jones	high jump	
Rafer Joseph	decathlon	
Tracy Joseph	long jump	
Kerry Jury	heptathlon	
Lisa Kehler	10 km road walk	1 x bronze
Karl Keska	5,000m	
Du'aine Ladejo	decathlon	
Denise Lewis	heptathlon	1 x gold
Jason Lobo	800m	
Vicky Lupton	10 km walk	
Margaret Lynes	shot put	
Chris Maddocks	20 km walk	
Keri Maddox	100m hurdles, 400m hurdles	
Joice Maduaka	100m, 200m, 4 × 100 m relay	1 x bronze
Karen Martin	javelin	1 x silver
John Mayock	1500 m	1 x silver
Kevin McKay	1,500m	
Emma Merry	discus	
Diane Modahl	800m	1 x bronze
Kirsty Morrison	javelin	1 x bronze
Judy Oakes	shot put	1 x gold
Helen Pattinson	1500m	
Steve Phillips	long Jump	
Michelle Pierre	400m, 4 × 400 m Relay	1 x silver
Mark Proctor	shot put	
John Regis	200 m	1 x bronze
Brendan Reilly	high jump	
Gowry Retchakan-Hodge	400m hurdles	1 x silver
Marcia Richardson	100m, 200m, 4 × 100 m relay	1 x bronze
Mark Richardson	400m, 4 × 400 m relay	2 x silver
Mark Roberson	javelin	
Danielle Sanderson	marathon	
Lorraine Shaw	hammer	1 x silver
Paul Slythe	4 × 400 m relay	1 x silver
David W. Smith	hammer	
Glen Smith	discus	
Lyn Sprules	hammer	
Darrell Stone	20 km walk	
David Taylor	marathon	
Barry Thomas	decathlon	
Michelle Thomas	400m, 4 × 400 m relay	1 x silver
Angie Thorp	100m hurdles	
Glynn Tromans	10,000m	
Ian Tullett	pole vault	
Andrew Tulloch	110m hurdles	
Solomon Wariso	400m, 4 × 400 m relay	1 x silver
Robert Weir	discus	1 x gold
Craig Wheeler	3,000m steeplechase	
Ben Whitby	3,000m steeplechase	
Andrea Whitcombe	5000 m	1 x silver
Anthony Whiteman	1500 m	1 x bronze
Janine Whitlock	pole vault	
Perriss Wilkins	discus	
Paula Wilson	pole vault	
Joanne Wise	long jump	1 x gold
Sarah Young	5,000m	

=== Badminton ===
Name	Event/s	Medal/s
Simon Archer	doubles, mixed doubles, team	1 x gold, 2 x bronze
Mark Constable	singles, team	1 x bronze
Joanne Davies	doubles, mixed doubles, team	1 x gold, 1 x silver
Joanne Goode	doubles, mixed doubles, team	3 x gold
Darren Hall	singles, team	2 x bronze
Chris Hunt	doubles, mixed doubles, team	3 x bronze
Tracey Hallam	singles, team	1 x gold, 1 x bronze
Donna Kellogg	doubles, mixed doubles, team	2 x gold, 1 x bronze
Peter Knowles	singles, team	1 x bronze
Julia Mann	singles, team	1 x gold, 1 x bronze
Rebecca Pantaney	singles, team	1 x gold
Julian Robertson	doubles, team	2 x bronze
Nathan Robertson	doubles, mixed doubles, team	1 x silver, 2 x bronze
Sara Sankey	doubles, team	1 x gold

=== Boxing ===
Name	Event/s	Medal/s
Chris Bessey	Light Middleweight 71 kg	1 x gold
Courtney Fry	Light Heavyweight 81 kg	1 x gold
Audley Harrison	Super Heavyweight 91 kg+	1 x gold
James Hegney	Flyweight 51 kg	
Gary Jones	Light flyweight 48 kg	1 x bronze
Andrew McLean	Lightweight 60 kg	1 x bronze
John Pearce	Middleweight 75 kg	1 x gold
David Walker	Welterweight 67 kg	
Nigel Wright	Light welterweight 63.5 kg	

=== Cycling ===
Name	Event/s	Medal/s
Sally Boyden	road race, points	
Jon Clay	team pursuit	1 x silver
Stuart Dangerfield	road time trial	
Ruth Ellway	road race	
Roger Hammond	road race	
Rob Hayles	points, team pursuit	2 x silver
Angela Hunter	road race	
Matt Illingworth	pursuit, team pursuit	1 x silver, 1 x bronze
Peter Jacques	sprint	
Maria Lawrence	road race	
Chris Lillywhite	road race	
Yvonne McGregor	pursuit	1 x bronze
Chris Newton	road time trial, road race	
Craig Percival	sprint	
Jason Queally	1 km time trial	1 x silver
Matt Stephens	road race	
Colin Sturgess	points, team pursuit	1 x silver
Sara Symington	road race	
Melanie Szubrycht	road race, points, sprint	
John Tanner	road race	
Chris Walker	road race	
Shaun Wallace	points, scratch	1 x silver
Michelle Ward	points	
Bradley Wiggins	pursuit, team pursuit	1 x silver

=== Diving ===
Name	Event/s	Medal/s
Tony Ally	1m & 3 m springboard	1 x bronze
Sally Freeman	10 m platform	
Mark Shipman	1m & 3m springboard	
Jane Smith	1m & 3m springboard	
Karen Smith	3m springboard & 10 m platform	
Leon Taylor	10 m platform	1 x bronze
Lesley Ward	10 m platform	

=== Gymnastics ===
Artistic

Name	Event/s	Medal/s
Andrew Atherton	team, all-around, rings, floor, parallel bars, pommel	1 x gold, 2 x silver
Ross Brewer	team, parallel bars	1 x gold
Gemma Cuff	team	1 x silver
Kelly Hackman	team, all-around, beam, floor, uneven bars	1 x silver
Craig Heap	team, all-around, horizontal bar, vault	1 x gold
Lisa Mason	vault, team, all-around, beam	1 x gold, 1 x silver
Lee McDermott	team, horizontal bar, pommel, rings	1 x gold, 1 x bronze
John Smethurst	team, floor	1 x gold, 1 x bronze
Melissa Wilcox	team, uneven bars	1 x silver

Rhythmic

Name	Event/s	Medal/s
Annabel Brown	individual all-around, team	
Natasha Hibbitt	individual all-around, team	
Rebecca Jose	team	

=== Hockey ===
Name	Event/s	Medal/s
Jennie Bimson	team	1 x silver
Kirsty Bowden	team	1 x silver
Karen Brown	team	1 x silver
Melanie Clewlow	team	1 x silver
Bobby Crutchley	team	1 x bronze
Tina Cullen	team	1 x silver
Jackie Empson	team	1 x silver
Guy Fordham	team	1 x bronze
Russell Garcia	team	1 x bronze
Brett Garrard	team	1 x bronze
Fiona Greenham	team	1 x silver
Julian Halls	team	1 x bronze
Stuart Head	team	1 x bronze
Michael Johnson	team	1 x bronze
David Luckes	team	1 x bronze
Denise Marston-Smith	team	1 x silver
Simon Mason	team	1 x bronze
Kerry Moore	team	1 x silver
Lucy Newcombe	team	1 x silver
Mandy Nicholson	team	1 x silver
Mark Pearn	team	1 x bronze
Justin Pidcock	team	1 x bronze
Carolyn Reid	team	1 x silver
Hilary Rose	team	1 x silver
Ben Sharpe	team	1 x bronze
Jane Sixsmith	team	1 x silver
Jane Smith	team	1 x silver
Jimmy Wallis	team	1 x bronze
Bill Waugh	team	1 x bronze
Duncan Woods	team	1 x bronze
Lucilla Wright	team	1 x silver
Jon Wyatt	team	1 x bronze

=== Lawn bowls ===
Name	Event/s	Medal/s
Tony Allcock	singles	
Catherine Anton	fours	1 x bronze
Jean Baker	singles	1 x bronze
John Bell	fours	
Grant Burgess	fours	
David Cutler	pairs	
Katherine Hawes	pairs	
Mandy Jacklin	fours	1 x bronze
Brett Morley	fours	
John Ottaway	pairs	
Shirley Page	fours	1 x bronze
Mary Price	pairs	
Norma Shaw	fours	1 x bronze
Andy Thomson	fours	

=== Netball ===
With a team captained by Fiona Murtagh and coached by Mary Beardwood, England won the bronze medal in the netball at the 1998 Commonwealth Games, defeating South Africa 56–54 in a playoff. In the group stages, they won four of their five matches. In the semi-finals they lost 70–30 to New Zealand.

Group A

14 September 1998	England	51–29	Barbados

15 September 1998	England	52–51	Jamaica

16 September 1998	England	62–32	Canada

17 September 1998	Malaysia	19–63	England

18 September 1998	Australia	66–29	England

Pos	Team	P	W	D	L	GF	GA	GD	Pts
1	Australia	5	5	0	0	377	145	+232	10
2	England	5	4	0	1	257	197	+60	8
3	Jamaica	5	3	0	2	317	223	-94	6
4	Barbados	5	2	0	3	219	267	-48	4
5	Canada	5	1	0	4	195	306	-111	2
6	Malaysia	5	0	0	5	120	347	-227	0

Qualified for Semi-final 1
Qualified for Semi-final 2

Playoffs
Semi-final 2

19 September 1998	New Zealand	70–30	England

Bronze medal match

21 September 1998	England	56–54	South Africa

Squad

England roster
Players
Coaches

Name	Pos	DOB	Height	Club	Nat	Caps
Karen Aspinall	WA, C	7 June 1978 (aged 20)	1.68 m (5 ft 6 in)
Lyn Carpenter		30 November 1965 (aged 32)	–
Lorraine Law			–
Hellen Manufor			–
Olivia Murphy	C, WA	24 April 1977 (aged 21)	–
Fiona Murtagh (c)	C, WD	30 April 1967 (aged 31)	–
Amanda Newton	GD, WD, GK	8 April 1977 (aged 21)	–	Old Plaistovians
Tracey Neville	WA, GA	21 January 1977 (aged 21)	1.73 m (5 ft 8 in)	YWCA Bury
Lucia Sdao (vc)			–
Naomi Siddall	GD, GK	2 April 1975 (aged 23)	1.82 m (6 ft 0 in)
Lisa Stanley			–
Joanne Zinzan	GD, WD		–

Head coach

- Mary Beardwood

Assistant coach

- Denise Egan

Manager: Maureen Mead
Physiotherapist: Mo Collins
Physiologist: Nuala Byrne
Doctor: Shirley Emerson

Notes

- (c) – Captain
- (cc) – Co-captain
- (vc) – Vice-captain
- – Injury / maternity leave
- (TRP) – Temporary Replacement Player

=== Shooting ===
Name	Event/s	Medal/s
Andy Austin	skeet pair	1 x silver
Nick Baxter	air pistol & pair, free pistol & pair	2 x gold
Bob Borsley	trap & pair	1 x bronze
Lucy Bryce	rifle 3 position & pair	
Peter Clark	centre fire pistol & pair, rapid fire pistol & pair	
Malcolm Cowdrey	skeet	
Neil Day	rifle prone & pair	1 x silver
Richard Fillery	rapid fire pistol & pair	
Peter Flippant	centre fire pistol & pair	
Mick Gault	air pistol & pair, free pistol & pair	4 x gold
Drew Harvey	skeet	1 x silver
Chris Hector	air rifle & pair, smallbore rifle & pair	2 x gold, 1 x bronze
Sharon Lee	rifle prone & pair	
Andrew Luckman	fullbore rifle	1 x bronze
Louise Minett	air rifle & pair	2 x bronze
Karen Morton	rifle 3 position & pair	
Susan Norman	rifle prone & pair	
Carol Page	air pistol & pair	
Ken Parr	smallbore rifle & pair	2 x bronze
Ian Peel	trap & pair	1 x silver, 1 x bronze
Helen Preston	air pistol & pair	
Antony Ringer	fullbore rifle	
Philip Scanlan	rifle prone & pair	1 x silver
Becky Spicer	air rifle & pair	1 x bronze
Nigel Wallace	air rifle & pair	1 x gold

=== Squash ===
Men

Name	County	Event/s	Medal/s
Mark Cairns	Oxfordshire	doubles	Bronze medal
Mark Chaloner	Lincolnshire	singles, doubles	Gold medal
Paul Johnson	Kent	singles, doubles,	,
Simon Parke	Yorkshire	singles, mixed doubles	Silver medal
Chris Walker	Essex	doubles	Bronze medal

Women

Name	County	Event/s	Medal/s
Linda Charman	Sussex	singles, doubles	
Suzanne Horner	Yorkshire	singles, mixed doubles	Silver medal
Cassie Jackman	Norfolk	singles, doubles	,
Jane Martin	Northumberland	doubles	
Sue Wright	Kent	singles, doubles	,

=== Swimming ===
Name	Event/s	Medal/s
Roger Ashcroft	200m butterfly	
Andrew Clayton	200m freestyle, 4x200 freestyle relay	1 x silver
Sarah Collings	800m freestyle	1 x bronze
Lyndsey Cooper	4 × 200 m freestyle relay	1 x silver
Joanne Deakins	200m backstroke	
Helen Don-Duncan	100/200m backstroke	1 x bronze
Caroline Foot	100m butterfly, medley relay	1 x bronze
Mark Foster	50m freestyle	1 x gold
Robert Greenwood	100m butterfly	
Martin Harris	100m backstroke, medley relay	1 x silver
James Hickman	100/200m butterfly, 200/400m medley, medley relay	1 x gold, 3 x silver
Linda Hindmarsh	100/200m breaststroke	
Vicky Horner	400m freestyle	1 x silver
Anthony Howard	4 × 100 m freestyle relay	1 x bronze
Claire Huddart	200m freestyle, 4x100/200m freestyle relay	2 x silver
Ben Lafferty	400m medley	
Jaime King	100/200m breaststroke, medley relay	1 x bronze
Georgina Lee	100/200m butterfly	
Karen Legg	200m freestyle, 4x100/200m freestyle relay	2 x silver
Brett Lummis	200m medley	
Richard Maden	100/200m breaststroke, medley relay	1 x silver
Gavin Meadows	50/100/200m freestyle, 4x100/200m freestyle relay, medley relay	2 x silver, 2 x bronze
Darren Mew	100/200m breaststroke, medley relay	1 x silver, 1 x bronze
Simon Militis	200m backstroke	
Samantha Nesbit	200/400m medley	
Stephen Parry	200m butterfly	1 x bronze
Margie Pedder	100/200m butterfly, 400m freestyle	
Karen Pickering	50/100/200m freestyle, 4x100/200m freestyle relay	3 x silver
Sarah Price	100m backstroke, medley relay	1 x bronze
Sue Rolph	50/ 100m freestyle, 200 medley 4 × 200 m freestyle relay, medley relay	2 x gold, 1 x silver, 2 x bronze
Adam Ruckwood	100/200m backstroke	
James Salter	200/400m freestyle, 4 × 200 m freestyle relay	1 x silver
Katy Sexton	200m backstroke	1 x gold
Nicholas Shackell	50/100m freestyle, 4 × 100 m freestyle relay, medley relay	1 silver, 1 x bronze
Helen Slatter	100m backstroke	
Mark Stevens	100m freestyle, 4x100/200m freestyle relay	1 x silver, 1 x bronze
Adrian Turner	200/400m medley	
Adam Whitehead	200m breaststroke	1 x bronze
Aaron Wiles	100m butterfly	
Neil Willey	100/200m backstroke, medley relay	1 x silver
Ian Wilson	1500m freestyle	

=== Synchronised swimming ===
Name	Event/s	Medal/s
Gayle Adamson	solo	1 x bronze
Adele Carlsen	duet	1 x bronze
Katie Hooper	duet	1 x bronze

=== Ten-pin bowling ===
Name	Event/s	Medal/s
Pauline Buck	singles, doubles, mixed doubles	1 x silver
Gemma Burden	singles, doubles, mixed doubles	
Wayne Greenall	singles, doubles, mixed doubles	
Richard Hood	singles, doubles, mixed doubles	1 x silver

=== Weightlifting ===
Name	Event/s	Medal/s
Anthony Arthur	94 kg	1 x silver
Andrew Callard	94 kg	2 x silver
Stewart Cruickshank	69 kg	1 x silver
Karl Grant	105 kg	1 x bronze
Giles Greenwood	105 kg+	1 x silver, 1 x bronze
Leon Griffin	85 kg	2 x gold, 1 x silver
Stephen Ward	85 kg	1 x gold, 2 x silver
Thomas Yule	105 kg	3 x silver

== See also ==
- England at the Commonwealth Games
