= Bret Hudson =

Australian gymnast (1973–2023)

- Full name: Bret Richard Hudson
- Born: 2 October 1973 Sydney, Australia
- Died: 14 June 2023 (aged 49) Brisbane, Australia
- Height: 160 cm (5 ft 3 in)

Gymnastics career
- Discipline: Men's artistic gymnastics
- Country represented: Australia
Medal record
Men's artistic gymnastics
Representing Australia
Commonwealth Games
Gold medal – first place	1994 Victoria	Vault
Silver medal – second place	1994 Victoria	Team
Silver medal – second place	1998 Kuala Lumpur	Team
Bronze medal – third place	1998 Kuala Lumpur	Vault
Bronze medal – third place	1998 Kuala Lumpur	Parallel bars

Bret Richard Hudson (2 October 1973 – June 2023) was an Australian gymnast. He competed at the 1996 Summer Olympics.

== Gymnnastics career ==
=== Olympic Games ===
Hudson with Brennon Dowrick competed in the Men's Artistic competition at the 1996 Atlanta Olympics and finished 51st in the Men's Individual All Round.

=== World Championships ===
Hudson represented Australia at six World Championships - 1991, 1992, 1993, 1994, 1995, and 1997.

=== Commonwealth Games ===
Hudson competed at two Commonwealth Games:
- 1994 Victoria - Gold medal in Vault, Silver Medal in Team Event.
- 1998 Kuala Lumpur - Silver medal in Team Event, Bronze medal in Parallel Bars, Bronze medal in Vault

=== Summer Universiade ===
Hudson competed at the 1995 Summer Universiade.

== Recognition ==
Hudson held an Australian Institute of Sport gymnastics scholarship from 1988 to 1998. In 1991, he was Gymnastics Australia Junior Male Gymnast of the Year. He was inducted into Gymnastics Australia Hall of Fame.

== Death ==
Hudson died on 14 June 2023, at the age of 49.
