= Lisa Mason =

British gymnast

Personal information
- Full name: Lisa Elena Jane Mason
- Nationality: English
- Born: 26 February 1982 (age 44) Aylesbury, Buckinghamshire

Sport
- Sport: Gymnastics
- Club: Huntington Gymnastics Club
Medal record
Gymnastics
Representing England
Commonwealth Games
Gold medal – first place	1998 Kuala Lumpur	vault
Silver medal – second place	1998 Kuala Lumpur	team event

Lisa Elena Jane Mason (born 26 February 1982 in Aylesbury, England) is a British gymnast who has competed for her country at the Commonwealth Games (for England), European championships, World championships and the Olympic Games. She was the vault champion at the 1998 Commonwealth Games, and was part of the first Great Britain women's artistic gymnastic team to qualify for the team event at the Olympic Games.

Having retired aged 18 in 2001, Mason made a comeback in aged 31, winning numerous national titles and being invited to World trials for the Great Britain team, despite team ranking having improved in the years since her first retirement.

In 2020 Mason, with fellow gymnast Catherine Lyons went public with allegations of serious physical and mental abuse within the British Gymnastics system In response several elite and former elite gymnasts came forward, corroborating Lyons and Mason's allegations in their own careers, including European champions Becky Downie and Ellie Downie and Olympic medallist Amy Tinkler . Later that year, British Gymnastics CEO Jane Allen resigned from her role, though denied her resignation was linked to the Lyons and Mason interviews and their fallout.

== Gymnastics career ==
Lisa Mason began training at Huntingdon Gym Club at the age of five. She has represented her country at three European championships and world championships events, Commonwealth Games and Olympic Games. She represented England and won a gold medal in the vault and also won a silver medal in the team event, at the 1998 Commonwealth Games in Kuala Lumpur.

She was the first British gymnast to make finals in European and World Championships.

In January 2013, after 12 years away from the sport, Mason announced her comeback with the aim of qualifying for the Glasgow 2014 Commonwealth Games. Mason went on to compete at the English and British championships the following year, picking up a collection of medals on vault and floor and finishing top 8 on both beam and bars.

== Personal life ==
Mason is involved in gymnastics as a coach and a choreographer and is also a stunt double and sports model. She is known for her outlandish gymnastics attire. In 2020, following the gymnastics abuse revelations in the press Mason talked about the dark side of British sport, in order to encourage fellow sufferers.
