= Kris Burley =

Canadian gymnast (born 1974)

- Full name: Kristan A. Burley
- Born: January 29, 1974 (age 52) Truro, Nova Scotia, Canada

Gymnastics career
- Country represented: Canada
Medal record
Men's gymnastics
Representing Canada
Pan American Games
Bronze medal – third place	1995 Mar del Plata	Floor exercise
Bronze medal – third place	1995 Mar del Plata	Vault
Bronze medal – third place	1999 Winnipeg	Team
Bronze medal – third place	1999 Winnipeg	Vault
Commonwealth Games
Gold medal – first place	1994 Victoria	Men's team
Silver medal – second place	1994 Victoria	Parallel bars
Silver medal – second place	1994 Victoria	Vault
Silver medal – second place	1994 Victoria	Floor
Silver medal – second place	1998 Kuala Lumpur	Men's horizontal bar
Bronze medal – third place	1998 Kuala Lumpur	Men's team

Kristan A. Burley (born January 29, 1974) is a Canadian gymnast who has represented Canada at the Commonwealth Games, the Pan American Games and the Olympic Games.

Originally from Truro, Nova Scotia, he was based in Richmond Hill, Ontario and Fredericton, New Brunswick during his competitive career.

== Gymnastics career ==
He was a competitive athlete from 1989 to 1999, winning four national championships in gymnastics during his career and representing Canada at the World Championships in Gymnastics, the Commonwealth Games, the Pan American Games and the Olympics.

In his first national championship, he won the junior-level all-around with 108.1 points to 101.6 for his nearest competitor. He also qualified for several senior-level events despite being just 16 years old at the time, and won the vault and floor events at that level as well. He won the national senior men's all-around in 1995.

=== Commonwealth Games ===
At the 1994 Commonwealth Games in Victoria, British Columbia, Burley won three silver medals as a solo competitor in floor, vault and parallel bars. In the men's team event, he was the last floor performer after teammates Alan Nolet, Richard Ikeda and Travis Romagnoli; in what he would later describe as one of the best performances of his life, he scored 9.55 to secure the gold medal for the Canadian team.

At the 1998 Commonwealth Games in Kuala Lumpur, Malaysia, he won a silver medal in the men's horizontal bar, and a bronze medal in the men's team event.

=== Pan American Games ===
Burley won two bronze medals as a solo competitor and one bronze medal with the Canadian team at the 1995 Pan American Games in Mar del Plata, Argentina, and one bronze medal at the 1999 Pan American Games in Winnipeg, Manitoba.

=== Olympics ===
He competed at the 1996 Summer Olympics in Atlanta, Georgia, finishing 69th in the artistic individual all-around.

== Awards and honours ==
He was named male athlete of the year by Sport New Brunswick in 1997, and by Gymnastics Canada in 1996 and 1998.

== Post-competition career ==
Burley announced his retirement from competition in 1999, and subsequently worked as a television production assistant and served on the board of directors of the Association of Canada's National Team Athletes. He worked with Cirque du Soleil for several years as a performer in Alegría and as assistant artistic director of Dralion. He later worked on the communications and media team for Toronto's bid to host the 2015 Pan American Games.

== Personal life ==
Openly gay, he is also a spokesperson for the Canadian Olympic Committee's program to combat homophobia in sport.
