= Andrew Atherton (gymnast) =

British gymnast (born 1975)

- Full name: Andrew Mark Atherton
- Born: 1975 Leigh

Gymnastics career
- Discipline: Men's artistic gymnastics
- Country represented: England
Medal record
Men's artistic gymnastics
Representing England
Commonwealth Games
Gold medal – first place	1998 Kuala Lumpur	Team
Silver medal – second place	1998 Kuala Lumpur	All-around
Silver medal – second place	1998 Kuala Lumpur	Rings

Andrew Mark Atherton (born 1975) is a male former British gymnast.

== Gymnastics career ==
Atherton represented England and won a gold medal in the team event and two silver medals in the rings and all-around events, at the 1998 Commonwealth Games in Kuala Lumpur, Malaysia.
