= Julie Beaulieu =

Canadian gymnast (born 1983)

Personal information
- Born: 28 April 1983 (age 42) Montreal, Quebec, Canada

Sport
- Sport: Gymnastics

Julie Beaulieu (born 28 April 1983) is a Canadian gymnast. She competed at the 2000 Summer Olympics.
