= Laura Robertson =

New Zealand gymnast

Personal information
- Nationality: New Zealand
- Born: 17 January 1982 (age 43); Bay of Islands, New Zealand

Sport
- Sport: Gymnastics

Laura Robertson (born 17 January 1982) is a New Zealand gymnast. She competed at the 2000 Summer Olympics.
