= Ross Brewer (gymnast) =

British gymnast (born 1979)

- Full name: Ross Paul Brewer
- Born: 1 October 1979 (age 46) Wycombe, England

Gymnastics career
- Country represented: England
Medal record
Men's artistic gymnastics
Representing England
Commonwealth Games
| Gold medal – first place | 1998 Kuala Lumpur | Team |
| Gold medal – first place | 2002 Manchester | Team |
| Bronze medal – third place | 2006 Melbourne | Team |

Ross Paul Brewer (born 1 October 1979) is a male former British gymnast. He is a double gold medal winner at the Commonwealth Games.

== Gymnastics career ==
Brewer represented England and won a gold medal in the team event, at the 1998 Commonwealth Games in Kuala Lumpur, Malaysia. Four years later he repeated the success of winning team gold at the 2002 Commonwealth Games in Manchester and won a bronze medal at his third Commonwealth Games in 2006 at Melbourne.
