= Annika Reeder =

British artistic gymnast

- Full name: Annika Louise Reeder
- Born: September 28, 1979 (age 46) Harlow, Essex

Gymnastics career
- Discipline: Women's artistic gymnastics
- Country represented: Great Britain; England
- Club: South Essex Gymnastics Club
- Retired: January 2001
Medal record
Representing England
Commonwealth Games
Gold medal – first place	1994 Victoria	Team
Gold medal – first place	1994 Victoria	Floor Exercise
Gold medal – first place	1998 Kuala Lumpur	Floor Exercise
Silver medal – second place	1998 Kuala Lumpur	Team
Bronze medal – third place	1998 Kuala Lumpur	Vault

Annika Louise Reeder (born September 28, 1979 in Harlow, Essex, Great Britain) is a retired British artistic gymnast. She was the first gymnast from Great Britain to compete in two Olympic Games, in 1996 and 2000.

Reeder began gymnastics at the age of three in 1982, following in the footsteps of her sister Kirsty. She trained at the South Essex Gym Club under coach Rod Smith. She made her international debut at the 1993 Junior European Championships and entered the senior ranks in the following year.

In 1994 in Victoria, British Columbia, Canada, Reeder became England's youngest ever Commonwealth Games gold medallist at the age of fourteen, collecting golds in the team and the floor exercise. She collected a third gold medal at the Commonwealths in 1998. Reeder was also a European floor finalist in 1994, and a vault finalist in 1998. In the 1996 European Championships in Birmingham, Reeder finished 14th in the all-around, the highest ranking recorded for a British athlete at the time. Reeder represented the UK at the 1994 team, 1994 individual, 1995, 1996, 1997 and 1999 World Championships. She was a two-time Champion and four-time silver medalist at British Nationals and the English Champion in 1996.

Great Britain did not qualify to send a full team to the 1996 Olympics, but were permitted to send two gymnasts to compete as individuals. Reeder was the higher-ranked of the two British gymnasts, placing 66th in the prelims. At the 2000 Olympics in Sydney Australia, Reeder captained the British women's team. The squad finished 10th, its best Olympic placement ever. Annika qualified to the all-around finals, the culmination of a lifetime's ambition. However, her bid to compete in the all-around would be undone by the infamous vault fiasco. Prior to the all-around, unbeknownst to the athletes and coaches, the vaulting horse was set 2 inches (5 cm) too low. This completely altered gymnasts' pre and post-flight, and resulted in many crashes, falls and injuries. Reeder vaulted on the faulty apparatus and was, perhaps, the worst affected by the error. She was so injured on her vault attempts that she had to be helped off the mats and was forced to withdraw from the remainder of the competition.

== Eponymous skill ==
Reeder has one eponymous skill listed in the Code of Points.

Apparatus	Name	Description	Difficulty (Note: Valid for the 2025–2028 Code of Points)
Uneven bars	Reeder	Cast with 1½ turn (540°) to handstand	D
