= Emilie Goldblum =

Canadian dancer, aerialist, contortionist, and former gymnast

- Alternative name: Emilie Livingston
- Born: 4 January 1983 (age 43) Etobicoke, Ontario, Canada
- Spouse: Jeff Goldblum (m. 2014)

Gymnastics career
- Discipline: Rhythmic gymnastics
- Country represented: Canada
- Club: Kalev RSG Club
Medal record
Women's rhythmic gymnastics
Representing Canada
Pan American Games
Gold medal – first place	1999 Winnipeg	individual all-around
Commonwealth Games
Silver medal – second place	1998 Kuala Lumpur	Team All-around
Bronze medal – third place	1998 Kuala Lumpur	Clubs

Emilie Goldblum (née Livingston; born 4 January 1983) is a Canadian dancer, aerialist and contortionist, and retired Olympic rhythmic gymnast. She won the all-around at the 1999 Pan American Games.

== Gymnastics career ==
Goldblum began ballet at two years old. Her older sister trained in rhythmic gymnastics, and her coach was Goldblum's first rhythmic coach. Goldblum initially trained in artistic gymnastics beginning at age 4 and switched to rhythmic at age 11, which was considered late to start the sport. At around this time, she moved to Russia (to Novogorsk near Moscow) to train with Russian rhythmic gymnasts and coaches working there, such as Irina Viner and Lucy Dimitrova. She was trained for most of her career by Dimitrova, who initially did not think Livingston had the correct body type for rhythmic gymnastics; however, she was impressed by how hard Livingston worked.

Goldblum won two novice and two junior Canadian titles. In 1997, she won the silver medal in the junior competition at the Four Continents Gymnastics Championships. In 1998, she won the silver medal at the senior Canadian Championships. In September, she competed at the 1998 Commonwealth Games, where she placed 5th in the all-around and won two medals, silver in the team competition with her Canadian teammates and bronze in the clubs final.

At the 1999 Four Continents Championships, Goldblum placed 5th and won silver with hoop and bronze with ball. Competing at the 1999 Pan American Games, Goldblum won the all-around gold by 0.001 points ahead of Jessica Howard, as well as bronze in the team event. She competed despite intense pain in her back. Goldblum said of her pain, "I was trying to not think about it. It was kind of difficult." Her victory meant that she won the berth for the Americas at the upcoming 2000 Summer Olympics. No other gymnasts from the Americas qualified for the Olympics. She finished in 26th place at the 1999 World Championships.

In June 2000, Goldblum did not compete at the Canadian Championships after hurting her ankle. However, she recovered to represent Canada at the 2000 Summer Olympics in Sydney, Australia, placing 18th in the individual all-around competition. She was the first gymnast to perform in the first round of the competition, and she dropped her rope seconds into her routine. "I was too relaxed and I made a small stupid mistake," Livingston said.

Goldblum competed at the 2001 World Championships, though not with all apparatuses.

For most of her career, Goldblum's mother was single, and even after remarrying, the family struggled to support her training. Sport Canada had ceased funding rhythmic gymnastics in 1996, so Goldblum did not receive government funding, and her frequent travels to Europe for training camps and competitions were expensive. Her mother took on two jobs, sold her home, found her small sponsorships, and eventually declared bankruptcy. In 1998, Goldblum briefly moved to France, her mother's home country, which was willing to fund her and also had better training facilities. She returned four months later due to being homesick and because her Toronto club found funding to sponsor her.

In 2000, due to winning an Olympic quota, she received funding from Gymnastics Canada to cover her travel. Olympian Patrick Bolger helped her find additional sponsorships. A costume designer, Susan Dicks, offered to make her leotards for the Olympics.

== Post-gymnastics career ==
Goldblum works as a contortionist as well as an aerialist. In the film Valerian and the City of a Thousand Planets, Goldblum was a body double for Rihanna performing Bubble's pole dance scene. She was also a body double for Emma Stone in La La Land.

== Personal life ==
She was born to a Canadian father and a French mother and holds dual citizenship. Her older sister danced at the National Ballet of Canada.

Goldblum married American actor Jeff Goldblum on 8 November 2014. They have two sons together, born in 2015 and 2017.

== Competitive history ==
Year	Event	Team	AA	Clubs	Hoop	Ribb.	Rope
1998	Commonwealth Games	2nd place, silver medalist(s)	—	3rd place, bronze medalist(s)	—	—	—
1999	Pan American Games	—	1st place, gold medalist(s)	—	—	—	—
1999	World Championships	—	26th	—	—	—	—
2000	Olympic Games	—	18th	—	—	—	—
