= Sonia Lawrence =

British gymnast (born 1980)

Personal information
- Nationality: British (Welsh)
- Born: 19 January 1980 (age 46) Caerphilly, Wales
- Height: 163 cm (5 ft 4 in)
- Weight: 52 kg (115 lb)

Sport
- Sport: Gymnastics / Athletics
- Events: floor, horse, uneven bars, beam / pole vault
- Club: Spelthorne Gymnastics Club
Medal record
Representing Wales
Commonwealth Games
Silver medal – second place	1994 Victoria	Vault

Sonia Lawrence (born 19 January 1980) is a British gymnast and later pole vaulter, who competed at the 1996 Summer Olympics.

== Biography ==
Lawrence grew up in Bedwas and joined the Heol Ddu Gymnastics Club in Bargoed at a young age. At the age of 12 Lawrence moved to Staines near London in order to gain full-time coaching.

After gaining selection for the British squad, she went to a pre-Olympic campand also represented Wales at the 1994 Commonwealth Games, where she won a silver medal in the vault. At the 1996 Olympic Games in Atlanta, Lawrence represented Great Britain in the preliminary rounds. Injury problems hampered her ability to compete for medals at the 1998 Commonwealth Games in Kuala Lumpur, Malaysia before retiring from gymnastics at the age of just 16.

Lawrence took up pole vault and her greatest achievement was finishing third behind Tracey Bloomfield in the pole vault event at the 2003 AAA Championships.
