= Leigh Marning =

Australian rhythmic gymnast

- Born: 8 February 1979 (age 47) Taree, New South Wales

Gymnastics career
- Discipline: Rhythmic gymnastics
- Country represented: Australia
Medal record
Representing Australia
Commonwealth Games
Silver medal – second place	1994 Victoria	Team All-around
Silver medal – second place	1998 Kuala Lumpur	Individual All-around
Silver medal – second place	1998 Kuala Lumpur	Rope
Bronze medal – third place	1994 Victoria	Clubs
Bronze medal – third place	1998 Kuala Lumpur	Team All-around
Bronze medal – third place	1998 Kuala Lumpur	Hoop

Leigh Marning (born 8 February 1979 in Taree, New South Wales, Australia) is a rhythmic gymnast who represented Australia at the Commonwealth Games. She now works as a contortionist and freelance circus performer and trainer, specializing in aerials, contortion and hula hoops.

== Career ==
She competed at the Commonwealth Games in 1994, where she won a silver medal in the team all-around event and a bronze medal in the club event, and in 1998, where she won silver medals in the individual all-around and rope events and a bronze medal in the team all-around event.

Marning trained at the National Institute of Circus Arts in Melbourne, Australia from 2001 to 2003 and was later accepted into the Cirque du Soleil show KÀ in Las Vegas.
