= Cyprus at the Commonwealth Games =

- CG code: CYP
- CGA: Cyprus Olympic Committee
- Website: olympic.org.cy (in Greek and English)
- Medals Ranked 16th: Gold 26 Silver 21 Bronze 29 Total 76

Commonwealth Games appearances (overview)
- 1978; 1982; 1986; 1990; 1994; 1998; 2002; 2006; 2010; 2014; 2018; 2022; 2026; 2030

Cyprus have competed in ten Commonwealth Games, making their first appearance in 1978, and missing only one Games since, in 1986. Cyprus have won 76 Commonwealth medals, many of them coming in judo, shooting and gymnastics.

== Medals ==
Games	Gold	Silver	Bronze	Total
1978 Edmonton	0	0	0	0
1982 Brisbane	0	0	0	0
1986 Edinburgh	Boycotted			
1990 Auckland	1	1	0	2
1994 Victoria	2	1	2	5
1998 Kuala Lumpur	1	1	1	3
2002 Manchester	2	1	1	4
2006 Melbourne	3	1	2	6
2010 Delhi	4	3	4	11
2014 Glasgow	2	4	2	8
2018 Gold Coast	8	1	5	14
2022 Birmingham	2	3	6	11
2026 Glasgow	1	5	6	12
Total	26	21	29	76
