= Kelly Hackman =

British gymnast

- Born: 10 December 1980 (age 45) Watford

Gymnastics career
- Country represented: England
- Former coach: Clem Malcolmson
Medal record
Athletics
Representing England
Commonwealth Games
Silver medal – second place	1998 Kuala Lumpur	team event

Kelly Louise Hackman (born 10 December 1980) is a British gymnast. She competed for Great Britain at the 2000 Summer Olympics in Sydney, Australia.

== Early life ==
Hackman briefly lived with her coach, Clem Malcolmson, and his wife before her family could move closer to Hackman's new gym.

== Competitive gymnast ==
Hackman trained at Woking gym. She competed in the 1998 Commonwealth Games where she won a silver medal with the British Team and placed 10th individually. The following year she won the Burrel Trophy for having the highest score in Floor Exercise at the British Team Championships. Also in 1999, Hackman was a reserve for the World British Team. In 2000, she won three bronze metals at the British national championship. That same year Hackman was selected as a member of the British gymnastics team at the 2000 Summer Olympics in Sydney, Australia. She was 19 years old. Her strongest apparatuses at the time were Beam and Uneven bars. It was the first time a British had qualified a team for the event. The British team finished in 10th place and Hackman was 74th in the Individual All-Around rankings.

== Later career ==
After gymnastics, Hackman became a journalist.
