= Lori Strong =

Canadian artistic gymnast

- Full name: Lori Strong
- Born: 12 September 1972 (age 53)

Gymnastics career
- Discipline: Women's artistic gymnastics
- Country represented: Canada (1987-1992)
- College team: University of Georgia
Medal record
Representing Canada
Commonwealth Games
Gold medal – first place	1990 Auckland	All-around
Gold medal – first place	1990 Auckland	Balance Beam
Gold medal – first place	1990 Auckland	Floor exercise
Gold medal – first place	1990 Auckland	Team
Silver medal – second place	1990 Auckland	Uneven Bars
Silver medal – second place	1990 Auckland	Vault

Lori Strong (born 12 September 1972) is a Canadian former artistic gymnast who represented her country at the 1988 and 1992 Summer Olympics. She is the 1990 Commonwealth Games all around, floor exercise, and beam champion. In 2000, she became a gymnastics sports commentator at the Canadian Broadcasting Corporation, covering the Olympic games.

== Eponymous skill ==
Strong has an eponymous uneven bars skill listed in the Code of Points, a transition from high to low bar with one and a half twists.

Apparatus	Name	Description	Difficulty (Note: Valid for the 2025-2028 Code of Points)
Uneven bars	Strong	Hang on high bar - swing forward with 1½ turn (540°) and flight over low bar to hang on low bar	E (0.5)
