= Melissa Wilcox (gymnast) =

Personal information
- Nationality: British
- Born: February 8, 1983 (age 43)

Sport
- Sport: Gymnastics
Medal record
Gymnastics
Representing England
Commonwealth Games
Silver medal – second place	1998 Kuala Lumpur	team event

Melissa Wilcox (born February 8, 1983) is a female former British gymnast.

== Gymnastics career ==
Wilcox represented England and won a silver medal in the team event, at the 1998 Commonwealth Games in Kuala Lumpur, Malaysia.
