= Erika-Leigh Stirton =

Canadian rhythmic gymnast and dancer

- Alternative name: Erika-Leigh Howard
- Born: August 8, 1980 (age 46) Oakville, Ontario, Canada
- Height: 1.67 m (5 ft 6 in)
- Spouse: Malcolm Howard (m. 2011)

Gymnastics career
- Discipline: Rhythmic gymnastics
- Country represented: Canada; (1992-2000)
- Club: Olympium Rhythmic Gymnastics
- Head coach: Danuta Smiechowski
- Retired: yes
Medal record
Women's rhythmic gymnastics
Representing Canada
Commonwealth Games
Gold medal – first place	1998 Kuala Lumpur	All-Around
Gold medal – first place	1998 Kuala Lumpur	Rope
Gold medal – first place	1998 Kuala Lumpur	Hoop
Gold medal – first place	1998 Kuala Lumpur	Clubs
Gold medal – first place	1998 Kuala Lumpur	Ribbon
Silver medal – second place	1998 Kuala Lumpur	Team
Four Continents Championships
Gold medal – first place	1999 Jacksonville	Rope
Gold medal – first place	1999 Jacksonville	Hoop
Silver medal – second place	1999 Jacksonville	Team
Bronze medal – third place	1999 Jacksonville	All-Around
Junior Pan American Championships
Gold medal – first place	1994 Monterrey	Team

Erika-Leigh Howard (née Stirton; born 8 August 1980) is a retired Canadian rhythmic gymnast. She's a multiple Commonwealth Games champion.

== Personal life ==
In 2011 Stirton married Olympic rower Malcolm Howard. Together they have two children.

== Career ==
Stirton took up rhythmic gymnastics when she was nine years old after three years of pre-competitive artistic gymnastics, and recreational artistic before that, at Mississauga Gym Club. In 1992 she made the Canadian national team.

She was crowned national junior champion in 1994. That year she also won five gold medals at the Junior Pan American Championships in Monterrey.

In January 1995 she won silver, behind Lindsay Richards at the Canadian Championships. She was then selected to compete at the World Championships in Vienna along Richards and Gretchen McLennan. There she was 25th in the All-Around.

Participating in the 1998 international Corbeil-Essonnes tournament she took 12th place. At the Commonwealth Games in Kuala Lumpur she won five gold medals in the individual events as well as silver in teams, along Emilie Livingston and Katie Iafolla.

After becoming the Canadian national champion, in June 1999 she participated in the Four Continents tournament in Jacksonville, winning gold with rope and hoop, silver in teams and bronze in the All-Around. Two months later she was selected for the Pan American Games in Winnipeg, finishing in 4th place. In September she competed in the World Championships in Osaka, being 30th overall.

In April 2000 she won gold in the All-Around at the Senior Pacific Alliance Championships in Christchurch. After winning gold individually and in groups at Elite Ontario she Stirton made the decision to retire from the sport.

After retirement she graduated from the University of Guelph and the School of Toronto Dance Theatre, and started working as a dancer, trainer and a choreographer.
