= Shaneez Johnston =

Australian rhythmic gymnast

- Born: 20 August 1981 (age 45)

Gymnastics career
- Discipline: Rhythmic gymnastics
- Country represented: Australia
Medal record
Commonwealth Games
Silver medal – second place	1998 Kuala Lumpur	Clubs
Silver medal – second place	1998 Kuala Lumpur	Ribbon
Bronze medal – third place	1998 Kuala Lumpur	Individual all-around
Bronze medal – third place	1998 Kuala Lumpur	Team
Pacific Rim Championships
Silver medal – second place	1998 Winnipeg	Ribbon
Bronze medal – third place	1998 Winnipeg	Rope

Shaneez Johnston (born 20 August 1981) is a retired Australian rhythmic gymnast.

== Personal life ==
She is the older sister of rhythmic gymnast Naazmi Johnston. In 2012 her boyfriend survived a 25 metres fall from their home's balcony.

== Career ==
In October 1997 Johnston was selected for the World Championships in Berlin, being 107th in qualification.

At the 1998 Pacific Rim Championships in Winnipeg she won silver with ribbon and bronze with rope. In September she competed at the Commonwealth Games where she won silver medals in the clubs and ribbon events and bronze medals in the individual all-around and team events.
