= Lee McDermott (gymnast) =

British gymnast

- Born: 11 February 1974 (age 52) London, England

Gymnastics career
- Discipline: Men's artistic gymnastics
- Country represented: (United Kingdom) Great Britain; England
- Club: Sutton School of Gymnastics London
Medal record
Men's artistic gymnastics
Representing England
Commonwealth Games
Gold medal – first place	1994 Victoria	Rings
Gold medal – first place	1998 Kuala Lumpur	Team
Bronze medal – third place	1994 Victoria	Team
Bronze medal – third place	1998 Kuala Lumpur	Horizontal bar

Lee McDermott (born 11 February 1974) is a male former British gymnast.

== Gymnastics career ==
McDermott competed in seven events at the 1996 Summer Olympics. He represented England and won a gold medal in the rings and a bronze medal in the team event, at the 1994 Commonwealth Games in Victoria, British Columbia, Canada. Four years later he represented England and won a gold medal in the team event and a bronze medal in the horizontal bar, at the 1998 Commonwealth Games in Kuala Lumpur, Malaysia.
