= David Phillips (gymnast) =

New Zealand gymnast

- Full name: David Brad Phillips
- Born: 28 October 1977 (age 48) Pukekohe, Auckland, New Zealand
- Height: 1.78 m (5 ft 10 in)

Gymnastics career
- Discipline: Men's artistic gymnastics
- Country represented: New Zealand
Medal record
Men's artistic gymnastics
Representing New Zealand
Commonwealth Games
Bronze medal – third place	1998 Kuala Lumpur	Floor

David Brad Phillips (born 28 October 1977) is a former New Zealand gymnast. He won a bronze medal at the 1998 Commonwealth Games in the men's floor exercise.

He competed at the 2000 Summer Olympics in several events.
