= Curtis Hibbert =

Canadian artistic gymnast (born 1966)

- Born: 2 September 1966 (age 60) Kingston, Jamaica

Gymnastics career
- Discipline: Men's artistic gymnastics
- Country represented: Canada
Medal record
World Championships
Silver medal – second place	1987 Rotterdam	Horizontal bar
Bronze medal – third place	1992 Paris	Vault
Commonwealth Games
Gold medal – first place	1990 Auckland	Team
Gold medal – first place	1990 Auckland	All-around
Gold medal – first place	1990 Auckland	Horizontal bar
Gold medal – first place	1990 Auckland	Parallel bars
Gold medal – first place	1990 Auckland	Rings
Silver medal – second place	1990 Auckland	Vault
Bronze medal – third place	1990 Auckland	Floor

Curtis Mayfield Hibbert (born 2 September 1966) is Canadian former artistic gymnast. He was a member of the Canada men's national artistic gymnastics team. He is the first Canadian and first person of colour to win World Championship medals in gymnastics. With five gold medals, Curtis Hibbert is the most successful gymnast in the history of a single Commonwealth Games Event.

== Early life ==
Born in Kingston, Jamaica, Hibbert began to show an interest in gymnastics at a young age. He immigrated to Canada with his family in 1972 and started gymnastics training three years later, at age nine. He has six siblings, three brothers and three sisters.

== Gymnastics career ==
Hibbert first came to national attention in 1983 with appearances in the Canadian Nationals, Canada Winter Games, and Pan Am Games. In 1987, he won a silver medal in the high bar at the World Championships; he was the only non-Eastern Bloc athlete to medal at that competition, and it was the first time any Canadian athlete had won a World medal. He said that he hoped his medal would help encourage other black athletes to participate in the sport.

He competed at the 1988 Seoul Olympics with the Canadian team, where he made the finals in three events and finished 22nd in the all-around competition.

Hibbert was the star performer of Canada's Commonwealth Games team in 1990, winning 7 medals: 5 gold, 1 silver, and 1 bronze. Hibbert again competed for Team Canada in the 1992 Barcelona Olympic Games, finishing 36th in the all-around. He tied for bronze on vault at the 1992 Paris World Gymnastics Championships. Hibbert retired from competitive gymnastics in 1993.

== Post-gymnastics career ==
Following retirement, Hibbert established the Kids Super Gym Club in Erin Mills, Ontario, fostering a strictly non-competitive atmosphere where fun takes precedence for young athletes of all skill levels. Throughout his gymnastics career, Hibbert has been a volunteer coach of young gymnasts from across the globe. Hibbert has done hundreds of speaking engagements across the country focused on goal setting and translating the Olympic experience into life experience. He has been to elementary and high schools across the city of Toronto speaking to students, helping teachers develop gymnastics programs, and motivating young people to be active.

In 1995, Hibbert began a career as one of the most active stuntmen in both Canadian and American movie and television productions. Some of his many works include 16 Blocks, X-Men, Chicago, and Undercover Brother.

Furthermore, since the mid 2000s, combined with his stunt work, Curtis Hibbert has consolidated a career as a public servant with the government of the City of Toronto, Ontario.
