= Grant Golding =

Canadian artistic gymnast

- Born: March 30, 1981 (age 45)

Gymnastics career
- Discipline: Men's artistic gymnastics
- Country represented: Canada (1998–2008)

Grant Golding (born 30 March 1981) is a Canadian male artistic gymnast, representing his nation at international competitions. He participated at the 2004 Summer Olympics and 2008 Summer Olympics. He also competed at world championships, including the 2007 World Artistic Gymnastics Championships in Stuttgart, Germany.

Following his gymnastics career, he co-founded Grand Forks Performing Arts School.
