= Brennon Dowrick =

Australian gymnast (born 1971)

- Full name: Brennon James Dowrick
- Born: 27 July 1971 (age 55) Wagga Wagga, Australia

Gymnastics career
- Discipline: Men's artistic gymnastics
- Country represented: Australia
Medal record
Men's artistic gymnastics
Representing Australia
Event	1st	2nd	3rd
Commonwealth Games	2	3	6
Total	2	3	6
Commonwealth Games
Gold medal – first place	1990 Auckland	Pommel horse
Gold medal – first place	1994 Victoria BC	Pommel horse
Silver medal – second place	1994 Victoria BC	Team
Silver medal – second place	1994 Victoria BC	All-around
Silver medal – second place	1998 Kuala Lumpur	Team
Bronze medal – third place	1990 Auckland	Team
Bronze medal – third place	1990 Auckland	Horizontal bar
Bronze medal – third place	1994 Victoria BC	Rings
Bronze medal – third place	1994 Victoria BC	Parallel bars
Bronze medal – third place	1998 Kuala Lumpur	All-around
Bronze medal – third place	1998 Kuala Lumpur	Pommel horse

Brennon James Dowrick OAM (born 27 July 1971) is an Australian gymnast. He competed at the 1992 Summer Olympics and the 1996 Summer Olympics.
