= Craig Heap =

English retired gymnast (born 1973)

Craig Heap OLY
- Full name: Craig Heap
- Born: 10 July 1973 (age 53) Burnley, England

Gymnastics career
- Discipline: Men's artistic gymnastics
- Country represented: (United Kingdom) Great Britain; England
Medal record
Commonwealth Games
Gold medal – first place	1998 Kuala Lumpur	Team
Gold medal – first place	2002 Manchester	Team

Craig Heap (born 10 July 1973) is a retired Commonwealth Games Gold medal winning gymnast, who has represented England over 100 times in various international gymnastic competitions, including at the 2000 Summer Olympics. He has been the English and British champion, as well as the Captain on many occasions. He was born in Burnley, Lancashire attending Heasandford Primary School and Barden High School.

== Early life ==
Heap began as a gymnast when he was just nine years old, after his parents took him to classes out of simple desperation, as he was very hyperactive as a child. In an interview with the BBC, he stated;

I was a bit of a tearaway as a kid, always jumping over the sofas and racing around the yard. My sister Nicola used to go to gym classes and one day my mum said: 'Instead of leaping over the furniture, get yourself down to the gym with your sister.

== Gymnastics career ==
After progressing as a junior gymnast, Heap eventually became professional and trained full time though he struggled for money as the grants from Sport England were not vast sums of money nor was much money generated through sponsorship. A series of injuries only helped to exacerbate his financial shortfalls, as long periods out meant even less money.

Heap had many such injuries throughout his career, undergoing five operations on his left elbow, surgery to both shoulders, calves, shins, an ankle and a wrist. Since retiring from gymnastics, Heap has taken a more media related role, appearing on Blue Peter, They Think It's All Over, Simply the Best and commentating for the BBC on gymnastics, as well as visiting schools around the United Kingdom. For the BBC he commentated on the gymnastics at the London 2012 Olympics alongside Alison Mitchell for BBC Radio 5 Live. At the Rio 2016, Tokyo 2020 and Paris 2024 Olympics, Heap provided TV commentary alongside Matt Baker and Christine Still. He did the same for the Glasgow 2014, Gold Coast 2018 and Birmingham 2022 Commonwealth Games.

In January 2007, Heap received the backing of Gordon Prentice, MP for Pendle, to build a specialist gymnastic centre for the 2012 Summer Olympics.
