= Philippe Rizzo =

Australian gymnast

- Full name: Philippe Sebastien Rizzo
- Born: 9 February 1981 (age 45) Sydney, Australia
- Height: 1.65 m (5 ft 5 in)

Gymnastics career
- Discipline: Men's artistic gymnastics
- Country represented: Australia
- Club: Australian Institute of Sport
- Head coach: Vladimir Vatkin
- Former coach: YU BO
Medal record
World Championships
Gold medal – first place	2006 Aarhus	Horizontal Bar
Silver medal – second place	2001 Ghent	Horizontal Bar
Summer Universiade
Gold medal – first place	2001 Beijing	Horizontal Bar
Commonwealth Games
Gold medal – first place	2002 Manchester	Pommel Horse
Gold medal – first place	2002 Manchester	Parallel Bars
Gold medal – first place	2002 Manchester	Horizontal Bar
Silver medal – second place	1998 Kuala Lumpur	Team
Silver medal – second place	2002 Manchester	All Around
Silver medal – second place	2006 Melbourne	Team
Silver medal – second place	2006 Melbourne	Parallel Bars
Bronze medal – third place	2002 Manchester	Team
Bronze medal – third place	2002 Manchester	Floor]]
Bronze medal – third place	2006 Melbourne	All Around

Philippe Sebastien Rizzo (born 9 February 1981 in Sydney) is an Australian gymnast and Australian Institute of Sport scholarship holder. He was the first Australian to win a medal at the World Artistic Gymnastics Championships when he won silver on the horizontal bar in Ghent in 2001. He is also the first Australian to win a gold medal at the World Artistic Gymnastics Championships when he won the horizontal bar in Aarhus in 2006.

Rizzo is also a multiple Commonwealth Games gold medalist and has represented Australia at the 2000 and 2004 Summer Olympics.

His hobbies include playing the guitar and surfing. Rizzo joined the AIS in 1995. His family is highly involved with gymnastics and runs the Australian Academy of Sport.

Inaugural inductee to University of Canberra Sport Walk of Fame in 2022.

== Personal life ==
Rizzo's father and brother were both involved with gymnastics as his brother, Blaise Rizzo, was a two-time Australian all-around champion and his father, Andre Rizzo, was an Olympian for France.
