= Richard Ikeda =

Canadian gymnast (born 1974)

- Full name: Richard Naofumi Ikeda
- Born: 26 November 1974 (age 51) Kamloops, British Columbia, Canada

Gymnastics career
- Discipline: Men's artistic gymnastics
- Country represented: Canada

Richard Naofumi Ikeda (born 26 November 1974) is a Canadian gymnast. He competed at the 1996 Summer Olympics.
