= Andrei Kravtsov =

Australian artistic gymnast

- Born: 10 May 1971 (age 55) Kursk, Soviet Union

Gymnastics career
- Discipline: Men's artistic gymnastics
- Country represented: Australia
- Retired: 2002
Medal record
Men's artistic gymnastics
Representing Australia
Commonwealth Games
| Gold medal – first place | 1998 Kuala Lumpur | All-around |
| Gold medal – first place | 1998 Kuala Lumpur | Floor |
| Gold medal – first place | 1998 Kuala Lumpur | Pommel horse |
| Gold medal – first place | 1998 Kuala Lumpur | Parallel bars |
| Silver medal – second place | 1998 Kuala Lumpur | Team |

Andrei Kravtsov (born 10 May 1971) is an Australian former gymnast who won four gold medals at the 1998 Commonwealth Games in Kuala Lumpur.

== Early life ==
Kravtsov is originally from the Russian city of Kursk and got started in gymnastics aged seven. After a two-year hiatus from gymnastics, he began competing again when he migrated to Australia in 1993. Based on Gold Coast initially, he was accepted into the AIS in 1995 and took up Australian citizenship.

== Gymnastics career ==
Representing his adopted country, Kravtsov was 27th in the men's all-around event at the 1995 World Artistic Gymnastics Championships. This qualified him for the 1996 Summer Olympics, but only six weeks out from the competition he snapped his right Achilles tendon, which forced him to withdraw.

He was 19th in men's all-around at the 1997 World Artistic Gymnastics Championships.

His finest moment came at the 1998 Commonwealth Games, where he took home four individual gold medals, in the all-around, floor exercise, parallel bars, pommel horse. He was also fourth in the horizontal bars and won a silver medal as part of the men's all-around team.

Injury also cost him a place in the 2000 Summer Olympics squad. He retired from the sport in 2002. In 2012 he was inducted into the Gymnastics Australia Hall of Fame.

== Post-gymnastics career ==
Kravtsov now runs his own gymnastics centre in Batemans Bay.
