= 1979 in Australia =

- Monarch: Elizabeth II
- Governor-General: Sir Zelman Cowen
- Prime minister: Malcolm Fraser
- Population: 14,359,255
- Australian of the Year: Neville Bonner and Harry Butler
- Elections: VIC, TAS, SA

The following lists events that happened during 1979 in Australia.

- Decades: 1950s; 1960s; 1970s; 1980s; 1990s
- See also: 1979 in Australian television; 1979 in Australian literature; Other events of 1979; Timeline of Australian history

== Incumbents ==
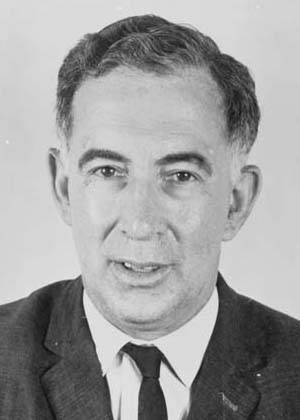
Sir Zelman Cowen

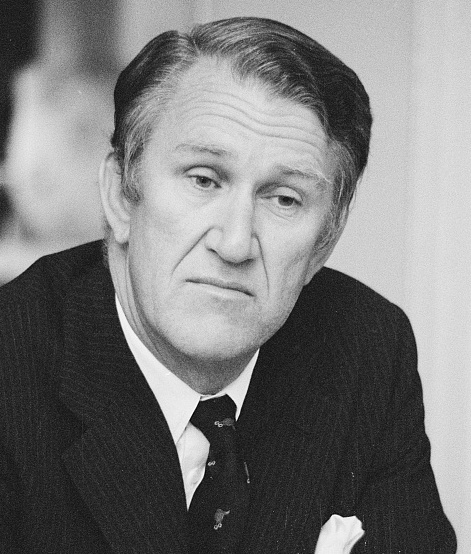
Malcolm Fraser

- Monarch – Elizabeth II
- Governor-General – Sir Zelman Cowen
- Prime Minister – Malcolm Fraser
  - Deputy Prime Minister – Doug Anthony
  - Opposition Leader – Bill Hayden
- Chief Justice – Sir Garfield Barwick

=== State and territory leaders ===
- Premier of New South Wales – Neville Wran
  - Opposition Leader – John Mason
- Premier of Queensland – Joh Bjelke-Petersen
  - Opposition Leader – Ed Casey
- Premier of South Australia – Don Dunstan (until 15 February), then Des Corcoran (until 18 September), then David Tonkin
  - Opposition Leader – David Tonkin (until 18 September), then Des Corcoran (until 2 October), then John Bannon
- Premier of Tasmania – Doug Lowe
  - Opposition Leader – Max Bingham (until 7 August), then Geoff Pearsall
- Premier of Victoria – Rupert Hamer
  - Opposition Leader – Frank Wilkes
- Premier of Western Australia – Sir Charles Court
  - Opposition Leader – Ron Davies
- Chief Minister of the Northern Territory – Paul Everingham
  - Opposition Leader – Jon Isaacs
- Chief Minister of Norfolk Island – David Buffett (from 10 August)

=== Governors and administrators ===
- Governor of New South Wales – Sir Roden Cutler
- Governor of Queensland – Sir James Ramsay
- Governor of South Australia – Sir Keith Seaman
- Governor of Tasmania – Sir Stanley Burbury
- Governor of Victoria – Sir Henry Winneke
- Governor of Western Australia – Sir Wallace Kyle
- Administrator of Norfolk Island – Desmond O'Leary (until 4 September), then Peter Coleman
- Administrator of the Northern Territory – John England

== Events ==
=== January ===
- 4 January — Australia's highest daily rainfall, 1,140 millimetres or 44.88 inches, is recorded at Bellenden Ker Top Station, Queensland.
- 9 January — Deputy Prime Minister Doug Anthony signs a pact to allow uranium mining to begin at the Ranger Uranium Mine in the Northern Territory. The pact gives the authority to develop the 100,000 tonne deposit to the Australian Atomic Energy Commission, Peko-Wallsend and the Electrolytic Zinc Company for a period of 21 years.
- 31 January — Bellenden Ker Top Station in Queensland receives the highest monthly rainfall total on record, with a total of 5,387 millimetres or 212.09 inches of rain recorded.

=== February ===
- 9 February – Associated Securities Limited, Australia's fourth-largest finance company, is placed into receivership. In a statement to the stock exchange, ASL directors stated that the results for the six months to 31 December had shown a loss of $2.5 million, plus an extraordinary loss of $1 million from foreign exchange movements.
- 12 February – Harry M. Miller's Computicket theatre and sporting booking agency collapses.

=== March ===
- 9 March – The Arbitration Commission awards Australian women the right to six weeks' compulsory unpaid maternity leave with the option of extending the leave to one year. The provisions, which will flow to all awards covering women in the private sector, will take effect on 2 April.

=== April ===
- 4 April – Domico Speranza hijacks a Pan-Am plane at Sydney Airport for 4 1/2 hours until shot dead by police.
- 11 April – The Razorback Blockade, a truck drivers' blockade, which had disrupted the eastern states for 10 days, ends. The truck drivers had been protesting against state road taxes and low cartage rates.

=== May ===
- 24 May – James William Miller, aged 39, is charged with the Truro murders - the murders of four young women 100 kilometres north-east of Adelaide. A fifth body is found with police searching for two more bodies, bringing the number of victims to a total of seven. Miller is charged with murdering Veronica Knight, 18, Sylvia Michelle Pittmann, 16, Vicki May Mowell, 26, and Connie Iordanides, 16.

=== June ===
- 8 June – Philip Silleny attempts to hijack a TAA aircraft near Brisbane but is disarmed by hostess Esme Qazim and other crew.
- 9 June –
  - A fire at Luna Park Sydney kills seven. Four young boys, a father and his two young sons die when the fire, believed to be caused by an electrical fault, engulf the ride. The park is forced to close.
  - Australia's first modern uranium mine opens at Nabarlek in Arnhem Land. A $25,000 party is held to celebrate the launch of the mine, which is also the first to open on Aboriginal tribal land.
- 21 June – Up to a million workers stop work across the country to protest the arrest of unionists in Western Australia for addressing a public meeting without police permission, causing public transport, industry and commercial services to be thrown into disarray.
- 23 June – New South Wales Premier Neville Wran opens the Eastern Suburbs six-station railway line which runs from Sydney city to Bondi Junction. The railway line has been a source of continuing controversy since work on it began. In 1976, Neville Wran referred to the project as probably "the most monumental financial scandal" in the state's history.

=== July ===
- 1 July –
  - Commonwealth death duties are abolished.
  - Responsibility for education in the Northern Territory is transferred from the Federal to the Northern Territory Government.
- 11 July – The American space station Skylab crashes in Esperance, Western Australia.
- 19 July – The Miss Universe final is celebrated in Perth.
- 20 July – Inaugural meeting of the National Farmers' Federation.
- 24 July – 14 coal miners die in a lethal gas explosion at Appin Colliery in New South Wales.

=== August ===
- 29 August – Sydney's new heliport at Darling Harbour is officially opened by Neville Wran.
- 30 August – Six people die when a Cessna 206 plane crashes near Shepparton, Victoria.

=== September ===
- 22 September – The standing conference of Canonical Orthodox churches in Australia is established.
- 26 September – New South Wales Attorney-General Frank Walker tables the 960-page Finnane Report in state parliament. The New South Wales Government gags Opposition calls for a debate report only 30 minutes after it is tabled.
- 27 September –
  - Australia announces the abolition of traditional trade preferences with Britain.
  - Ian Sinclair resigns as Federal Primary Industry Minister following allegations that he forged his father's signature on his family's annual returns. According to the Finnane Report tabled in State Parliament, Ian Sinclair was dishonest in arranging loans from a group of companies of which he was "de facto managing director" to the family pastoral company. Sinclair had denied the allegations the day before.

=== October ===
- 7 October – The Australia Refugee Advisory Council is established.
- 14 October – Australian Council of Trade Unions (ACTU) President Bob Hawke wins preselection for the safe ALP federal seat of Wills, making way for him to enter federal politics. Hawke defeated the Socialist Left candidate Gerry Hand winning 38 votes from the 70-member selection panel.
- 19 October – The Australian Federal Police is established under the command of Colin Woods.
- 20 October – Prime Minister Malcolm Fraser proclaims the first section of the Great Barrier Reef (the Capricornia section) a national park, making it the third Australian national park to be declared this year. Malcolm Fraser also announces the allocation of $300,000 to research projects to be set up in the region to increase the Federal Government's knowledge of this area.

=== November ===
- 5 November – The first New South Wales Lotto draw takes place. No-one chose the six winning numbers in the draw, so only half of the first prize – $193,576 – will be divided among the five members of the in the Money syndicate.
- 6 November – The Royal Commission into Drug Trafficking (Woodward Royal Commission) reports to the New South Wales Parliament, recommending increased penalties and no concessions for soft drugs.
- 30 November – The Australian Council of Trade Unions (ACTU), at a meeting of 24 major unions, rejects proposals to block the mining export of uranium.

=== December ===
- 16 December – Sunday trading in Sydney public bars begins.

== Arts and literature ==
- Wes Walters wins the Archibald Prize for his portrait of Philip Adams
- David Ireland's novel A Woman of the Future wins the Miles Franklin Award

== Film ==
- My Brilliant Career, directed by Gillian Armstrong, is released
- Mad Max

== Television ==
- 11 February – The Australian 60 Minutes begins on the Nine Network.
- 27 February – Prisoner makes its debut on the 0–10 Network.

== Sport ==
- 14 January – Tasmania beats Western Australia by 47 runs to win their first Gillette Cup title.
- 25 March – Australia is represented by nine long-distance runners (all men), including Robert de Castella, at the seventh IAAF World Cross Country Championships in Limerick, Ireland. Steve Austin is Australia's best finisher, claiming the 29th spot (38:36.0) in the race over 12 kilometres.
- 28 April – Collingwood beat a sixty-year-old record for the greatest VFL winning margin when they demoralise St Kilda by 178 points, beating South Melbourne's 171-point margin also against St Kilda, from 1919.
- 28 July – Fitzroy set a still-standing record winning margin when they beat Melbourne by 190 points at VFL Park. Their score of 36.22 (238) was a record until 1992.
- 12 August – Robert de Castella wins the men's national marathon title, clocking 2:13:23 in Perth.
- 22 September: The 1979 NSWRFL season culminates in minor premiers St. George's 17–13 victory over Canterbury-Bankstown in the Grand Final. North Sydney finish in last position, claiming the wooden spoon.
- 29 September Carlton Football Club wins the 1979 VFL Grand Final over Collingwood.
- 6 November – Hyperno wins the Melbourne Cup
- Victoria wins the Sheffield Shield
- Bumblebee IV takes line honours in the Sydney to Hobart Yacht Race. Screw Loose is the handicap winner
- England defeats Australia 5–1 in The Ashes
- Australia wins the Admiral's Cup
- Jack Newton wins the Australian Open golf championship
- The National Basketball League is founded

== Births ==
- 1 January – Brody Dalle, singer-songwriter
- 2 January – Robert Newbery, diver
- 3 January – Brooke Morrison, field hockey striker
- 6 January – Adrian Rainey, rugby league player
- February 12 – Jesse Spencer, actor and musician
- 15 February – James Harvey, basketball player
- 4 March – Geoff Huegill, swimmer
- 12 March – Jamie Dwyer, field hockey forward
- 16 March – Suzie Faulkner, field hockey striker
- 3 April – Sasa Ognenovski, Footballer
- 4 April
  - Heath Ledger, actor (died 2008)
  - Rebecca Stoyel, gymnast
- 9 April – Graeme Brown, cyclist
- 11 April – Danielle de Niese, opera singer
- 18 April – Zain Wright, field hockey midfielder
- 22 April – Daniel Johns, musician
- 4 June – Jade MacRae, singer
- 5 June – Matthew Scarlett, footballer and coach
- 7 June – Anna Torv, actress
- 11 June – Amy Duggan, Australian footballer and journalist
- 7 July – Loudy Tourky, diver
- 10 July – Russell Hinder, basketball player
- 15 July – Travis Fimmel, actor and model
- 24 July – Rose Byrne, actress
- 3 August – Nathan Crosswell, basketball player
- 9 August – Michael Kingma, basketball player
- 14 August – Paul Burgess, pole vaulter
- 16 August
  - Ian Moran, cricketer
  - Adam Darragh, basketball player
- 23 August – Lance Whitnall, Australian Rules footballer
- 12 September – Aaron Hopkins, field hockey defender
- 17 September – Chris Minns, politician
- 20 September – Damien Ryan, basketball player
- 29 September – Nathan Foley, singer (Hi 5)
- 11 October – Ryan Harris, cricketer
- 20 October – Tim Neesham, water polo player
- 24 October – Matthew Hadgraft, cabaret artist
- 6 November – Peter Ceawford, basketball player
- 9 November – Oliver Ackland, actor
- 12 November
  - Chad Cornes, footballer
  - Matt Stevic, footballer and umpire
- 16 November – Salli Wills, gymnast
- 6 December – Tim Cahill, soccer player
- 15 December – Sam Cawthorn, motivational speaker, author & entrepreneur
- 21 December – Stephen Lambert, field hockey goalkeeper

== Deaths ==
- 7 January – Ivan Stedman, Olympic swimmer (b. 1895)
- 15 April – Sir David Brand, 19th Premier of Western Australia (b. 1912)
- 16 April – Frank Stewart, New South Wales politician and rugby league footballer (b. 1923)
- 21 May – Walter Skelton, New South Wales politician (b. 1883)
- 4 June – Elena Domenica Rubeo, Australian community worker and businessperson (b. 1896)
- 6 June – Ion Idriess, author (b. 1889)
- 30 June – Jim Southee, New South Wales politician (b. 1902)
- 1 September – Mick Cronin, Australian rules footballer and television commentator (b. 1911)
- 14 November – Amelia Best, politician (b. 1900)
- 21 November – Marie Byles, solicitor and conservationist (b. 1900)
- 21 December – Eric Joseph Wright, medical administrator and public servant (b. 1912)

== See also ==
- 1979 in Australian television
- List of Australian films of 1979
