= Gymnastics at the 1994 Commonwealth Games =

- Venue: Victoria Memorial Arena
- Location: Victoria, Canada
- Dates: 18 to 28 August 1994

Gymnastics at the 1994 Commonwealth Games was the third appearance of Gymnastics at the Commonwealth Games and the second appearance of Rhythmic gymnastics. The events were held in Victoria, Canada, from 18 to 28 August 1994 and featured a record 20 events (an increase of one from 1990).

The gymnastics events were held at the Victoria Memorial Arena at 1925 Blanshard Street near the centre of Victoria.

Australia topped the gymnastics medal table by virtue of winning ten gold medals.

== Medal table ==
* Host nation (Canada)

Medals won by nation with totals, ranked by number of golds—sortable
Rank	Nation	Gold	Silver	Bronze	Total
1	Australia	10	6	7	23
2	Canada*	5	11	6	22
3	England	5	2	7	14
4	Wales	0	1	0	1
5	New Zealand	0	0	1	1
5	Scotland	0	0	1	1
Totals (6 entries)		20	20	22	62

== Medallists ==
=== Artistic gymastics ===
Men's events

Event	Gold		Silver		Bronze	
All-Around	Neil Thomas; England	55.95	Brennon Dowrick; Australia	55.525	Peter Hogan; Australia	54.95
Team	Canada; Alan Nolet; Kristan Burley; Richard Ikeda; Travis Romagnoli	164.7	Australia; Brennon Dowrick; Bret Hudson; Nathan Kingston; Peter Hogan	164.5	England; Lee McDermott; Neil Thomas; Paul Bowler; Robert Barber	162.375
Horizontal Bar	Alan Nolet; Canada	9.512	Richard Ikeda; Canada	9.5	Nathan Kingston; Australia	9.325
Parallel Bars	Peter Hogan; Australia	9.4	Kris Burley; Canada	9.35	Brennon Dowrick; Australia	9.25
Vault	Bret Hudson; Australia	9.375	Kris Burley; Canada	9.312	Neil Thomas; England	9.306
Pommel Horse	Brennon Dowrick; Australia	9.425	Nathan Kingston; Australia	9.4	Richard Ikeda; Canada	9.225
Rings	Lee McDermott; England	9.475	Peter Hogan; Australia	9.275	Brennon Dowrick; Australia	9.15
Floor	Neil Thomas; England	9.662	Kris Burley; Canada	9.437	Alan Nolet; Canada	9.15

Women's events

Event	Gold		Silver		Bronze	
All-Around	Stella Umeh; Canada	38.4	Rebecca Stoyel; Australia	38.037	Zita Lusack; England	37.725
Team	England; Annika Reeder; Jackie Brady; Karin Szymko; Zita Lusack	114.22	Canada; Jaime Hill; Lisa Simes; Stacey Galloway; Stella Umeh	113.65	Australia; Joanna Hughes; Rebecca Stoyel; Ruth Moniz; Salli Wills	113.62
Asymmetric Bars	Rebecca Stoyel; Australia	9.525	Stella Umeh; Canada	9.45	Sara Thompson; New Zealand	9.337
Beam	Salli Wills; Australia	9.075	Zita Lusack; England	8.987	Ruth Moniz; Australia	8.9
Vault	Stella Umeh; Canada	9.556	Sonia Lawrence; Wales	9.543	Lisa Simes; Canada	9.506
Floor	Annika Reeder; England	9.75	Jackie Brady; England	9.662	Lisa Simes; Canada	9.55

=== Rhythmic gymnastics ===
Event	Gold		Silver		Bronze	
Women
All-Around	Kasumi Takahashi; Australia	36.85	Camille Martens; Canada	36.6	Debbie Southwick; England	36.35
Team	Canada; Camille Martens; Gretchen McLennan; Lindsay Richards	106.9	Australia; Kasumi Takahashi; Katie Mitchell; Leigh Marning	105.3	England; Aicha McKenzie; Debbie Southwick; Linda Southwick	103.3
Ball	Kasumi Takahashi; Australia	9.2	Camille Martens; Canada	9	Aicha McKenzie; England; Gretchen McLennan; Canada	8.8
Clubs	Kasumi Takahashi; Australia	9.4	Camille Martens; Canada	9.15	Leigh Marning; Australia	9
Hoop	Kasumi Takahashi; Australia	9.3	Lindsay Richards; Canada	9.05	Aicha McKenzie; England; Joanne Walker; Scotland	8.9
Ribbon	Kasumi Takahashi; Australia	9.2	Camille Martens; Canada	9.05	Gretchen McLennan; Canada	9

== See also ==
- List of Commonwealth Games medallists in gymnastics
