= List of Australian films of 1979 =

== 1979 ==
Title	Director	Cast	Genre	Notes
Alison's Birthday	Ian Coughlan	Joanne Samuel, Lou Brown, Martin Vaughan, Margie McCrae, John Bluthal, Bunney Brooke, Lisa Peers, Robyn Gibbes, Vincent Ball, Eric Oldfield, Ralph Cotterill, Marion Johns, Belinda Giblin, Ros Speirs, Ian Coughlan	Horror / Thriller Feature film	IMDb
All in the Same Boat			Short	IMDb
Apostasy	Zbigniew Friedrich	Rod McNicol, Juliet Bacskai, Phil Motherwell, Irene Baberis, Ian Money	Drama Feature film	IMDb
As a Matter of Fact			Short / Documentary	IMDb
Banana Bender		Caz Adams, Maurie Fields, John Hargreaves, Lyndel Rowe	Drama Short film	
Born to Run	Don Chaffey	Robert Bettles, Tom Farley, Mary Ward, Andrew McFarlane, Julieanne Newbould, Alexander Archdale, John Meillon, Wynn Roberts, Kit Taylor, Les Foxcroft, Aileen Britton, Nigel Lovett	Family Feature film later screened on 'The Wonderful World of Disney' series 1979	
Buckeye and Pinto	Phil Pinder	Mitchell Faircloth, Simon Thorpe, Gary Adams	Short	IMDb
Burn The Butterflies	Oscar Whitbread	Ray Barrett, Fred Parslow, Gerard Maguire, George Mallaby, Alan Hopgood, Monica Maughan, John Wood, John Bowman, Burt Cooper, Rowena Wallace	Drama ABC TV film	aka ABC Teleplay
Cathy's Child	Donald Crombie	Michele Fawdon, Alan Cassell, Bryan Brown, Arthur Dignam, Harry Michaels, Robert Hughes, Flavia Arena, Anna Hruby, Sophia Haskas, Frankie J. Holden, Sally McKenzie, Willie Fennell	Drama Feature film Drama based on a true story	IMDb
Dawn!	Ken Hannam	Bronwyn Mackay-Payne, Ron Haddrick, Bunny Brooke, Tom Richards, Ron Haddrick, John Diedrich, Ivar Kants, Gabrielle Hartley, Judi Farr, John Clayton	Sports / Biography Feature film	IMDb, entered into the 11th Moscow International Film Festival
Dimboola	John Duigan	Max Gillies, Bruce Spence, Natalie Bate, Alan Rowe, Bill Garner, Evelyn Krape, Tim Robertson, Irene Hewitt, Terry McDermott, Val Jellay, Max Cullen	Comedy Feature film	IMDb
Evictions	Richard Lowenstein	David Scott, Marion Edward, Cathy Hurley	Short	IMDb
Exits	Paul Davies	Robert Antoniades, Kim Bannikoff, Monica Bannikoff	Drama	IMDb
Felicity	John D. Lamond	Glory Annen, Marilyn Rodgers, Christopher Milne, Joni Flynn, Jody Hansen	Drama / Erotica / Romance Feature film	IMDb
The Franky Doyle Story	Graeme Arthur	Carol Burns, Peita Toppano, Val Lehman, Colette Mann, Patsy King, Sheila Florance, Fiona Spence, Patricia Kennedy, Barry Quin, Elspeth Ballantyne	Drama TV film	Based on Prisoner TV series.
Ileksen	Dennis O'Rourke		Documentary	IMDb, aka: "Ileksen: Politics for Papua New Guinea"
In Search of Anna	Esben Storm	Richard Moir, Judy Morris, Chris Haywood, Bill Hunter, Gary Waddell, Ian Nimmo, Alex Taifer, Maurie Fields	Mystery Drama Feature film	
The John Sullivan Story	David Stevens	Andrew McFarlane, Olivia Hamnett, Frank Gallacher, Ronald Lewis, Jonathan Hardy, Roger Oakley, Carol Burns, Ronald Falk, Alan Jervis, Vera Plevnik	Drama / War TV film	Based on The Sullivans TV series.
The Journalist	Michael Thornhill	Jack Thompson, Elizabeth Alexander, Sam Neill, Charles Tingwell, Carol Raye, Jane Harders, Penne Hackforth-Jones, Michelle Jarman, Stuart Wagstaff, Slim de Grey, Frankie J. Holden, Ray Meagher, Martyn Sanderson, Frank Wilson, Anna Hruby	Comedy / Romance Feature film	IMDb
Just Out of Reach	Linda Blagg	Lorna Lesley, Sam Neill, Martin Vaughan, Judi Farr, Ian Gilmour, Jackie Dalton, Lou Brown	Drama Feature film	IMDb
The King of the Two Day Wonder	Kevin Anderson	Walter Dobrowolski, Sigrid Thornton, Allen Bickford, James Robertson, Peter Sumner, Maureen O'Loughlin	Drama Feature film	IMDb
Kostas	Paul Cox	Takis Emmanuel, Wendy Hughes, John Waters, Kris McQuade, Chris Haywood, Dawn Klingberg, Graeme Blundell, Maurie Fields, Norman Kaye, Tony Llewellyn-Jones	Drama / Romance Feature film	IMDb
The Last of the Knucklemen	Tim Burstall	Gerard Kennedy, Michael Preston, Steve Bisley, Michael Caton, Peter Hehir, Michael Duffield, Dennis Miller, Stewart Faichney, Steve Rackman, Denise Drysdale, Saviour Sammut, Tim Robertson	Drama Feature film	IMDb
The Little Convict	Yoram Gross	Voice: Rolf Harris	Animation, Live Action / Drama / Comedy Feature film	IMDb
Mad Max	George Miller	Mel Gibson, Steve Bisley, Joanne Samuel, Hugh Keays-Byrne, Tim Burns, Vincent Gil, Roger Ward, Reg Evans, Sheila Florance	Action / Adventure Feature film	IMDb
Mallacoota Stampede	Peter Tammer	Donny Mason, Deborah Conway, Michael Bladen		IMDb
Money Movers	Bruce Beresford	Terence Donovan, Tony Bonner, Ed Devereaux, Charles 'Bud' Tingwell, Candy Raymond, Jeanie Drynan, Bryan Brown, Lucky Grills	feature film	
Morris Loves Jack	Sonia Hofmann	John Hargreaves, Bill Hunter, Kris McQuade	Short	IMDb
Mutiny on the Western Front	Richard Dennison	F. Birdwood, Bill Gammage, Kaiser Wilhelm II	Documentary / War	IMDb
My Brilliant Career	Gillian Armstrong	Judy Davis, Sam Neill, Wendy Hughes, Robert Grubb, Max Cullen, Patricia Kennedy, Peter Whitford, Aileen Britton, Carole Skinner, Alan Hopgood, Ray Meagher, Julia Blake, Simone Buchanan	Biography / Drama / Romance Feature film	IMDb
Now and Then	Mark Turnbull	Tony Barry, Ian Gilmour, Lisa Peers	Short / Drama	IMDb
Now You're Talking	Keith Gow	Don Bradman, Leo McKern	Documentary Short	IMDb
The Odd Angry Shot	Tom Jeffrey	Graham Kennedy, John Hargreaves, Graeme Blundell, Bryan Brown, Richard Moir, Ian Gilmour, Tony Barry, Ray Meagher, Frankie J. Holden, Brandon Burke, Graham Rouse, Max Cullen, Joy Westmore	Action/ Comedy / War Feature film	IMDb
Palm Beach	Albie Thoms	Bryan Brown, Nat Young, Ken Brown, Julie McGregor, John Flaus, John Clayton, David Elfick, Amanda Berry	Drama Feature film	
The Plumber	Peter Weir	Judy Morris, Ivar Kants, Robert Coleby, Candy Raymond, Paul Sonkkila, Henri Szeps	Thriller TV film	IMDb
Prophecies of Nostradamus	Paul Drane	John Waters, Kirk Alexander, Richard Butler	Documentary / History	IMDb
Pussy Pumps Up	Antoinette Starkiewicz		Short	IMDb
Puttin' on the Ritz	Antoinette Starkiewicz		Short	IMDb
Snapshot	Simon Wincer	Chantal Contouri, Robert Bruning, Sigrid Thornton, Robert Bruning, Hugh Keays-Byrne, Vincent Gil, Julia Blake, Denise Drysdale, Jon Sidney, Jacqui Gordon, Lisa Crittenden	Drama / Thriller Feature film	IMDb, aka: "One More Minute"
Thirst	Rod Hardy	Chantal Contouri, David Hemmings, Henry Silva, Max Phipps, Shirley Cameron, Max Phipps, Rod Mullinar, Rosie Sturgess, Robert Thompson, Walter Pym, Amanda Muggleton	Horror / Thriller Feature film	IMDb
This Woman Is Not a Car	Margaret Dodd	Phil Colson, Richard Morecroft, Daniel Sedgwick	Short	IMDb
Tim	Michael Pate	Piper Laurie, Mel Gibson, Alwyn Kurts, Pat Evison, Peter Gwynne, Deborah Kennedy, David Foster, James Condon, Allan Penney, Margo Lee, Louise Pajo	Drama / Romance Feature film	IMDb
Witches, Faggots, Dykes and Poofters	Digby Duncan	Jude Kuring	Documentary	IMDb

== See also ==
- 1979 in Australia
- 1979 in Australian television
