= Razorback (disambiguation) =

Razorback is a colloquial term in the United States and Australia for a type of feral pig.

Razorback may also refer to:

- The fin whale

== Entertainment ==
- Razorback (film), a 1984 Australian horror film based on a novel of the same name
- Razorback (band), a Filipino rock band
- Razorback (character), Buford Hollis, a comic book character introduced in the pages of Spectacular Spider-Man in 1977
- The Razorbacks, a Canadian rockabilly band

== Sports ==
- Arkansas Razorbacks, the names of college sports teams at the University of Arkansas in Fayetteville, Arkansas
- West Sydney Razorbacks, an Australian professional basketball team
- Rüsselsheim Razorbacks, a defunct American football Team from Rüsselsheim, Germany

== Other ==
- Razorback, New South Wales, a locality in Australia
- Razorback Blockade, an industrial dispute in Australia
- Razorback, a hiking trail on Mount Feathertop in the Australian state of Victoria
- USS Razorback, a World War 2 submarine
- Razorback2, a former server on the eDonkey filesharing network
- Dean Razorback, a guitar
- Early models of Republic P-47 Thunderbolt fighter aircraft
- A beer by Ringwood Brewery
- A worker who loads and unloads train cars for a circus
- The Razorback, a secondary weapon for the Sniper class in Team Fortress 2
- Razorback Mountain, a 2,605 m (8,547 ft) mountain on the border of Alberta and British Columbia.
- Razorback Mountain (British Columbia), a 3,183 m (10,443 ft) mountain, the highest peak of the Niut Range, which lies entirely in British Columbia.
