= List of environmental accidents in the fossil fuel industry in Australia =

This is a list of industrial accidents and incidents that have resulted in environmental damage and/or has resulted in death or major injury that have occurred within the fossil fuel industry in Australia, in either the extraction, mining, processing or transporting phases.

- Oil tanker Oceanic Grandeur oil spill – 1970
- Box Flat Mine explosion resulting in the death of 17 miners – 1972
- Bulk coal tanker Sygna oil spill – 1974
- Oil tanker Princess Anne Marie oil spill – 1975
- Kianga coal mine explosion – 1975
- Oil tanker World Encouragement oil spill – 1979
- Appin coal mine explosion resulting in the death of 14 miners – 1979
- Oil tanker Esso Gippsland oil spill – 1982
- Moura coal mine roof fall and explosion – 1986
- Collinsville Coal Roof collapse in mine shaft – 1988
- Crude oil tanker Arthur Phillip oil spill – 1990
- Oakleigh Number Three Colliery roof collapse resulting in death of a miner – 1990
- Newlands coal mine gas explosion resulting in death of miner – 1990
- Goonyella-Riverside coal mine outrush of coal and water – 1991
- South Bulli coal mine incident resulting in the death of 3 miners – 1991
- Western Main coal mine Pillar Collapse resulting in the death of 3 miners – 1991
- Moura Open Cut coal mine incident resulting in death of 2 miners and serious injury to 2 others – 1993
- Oil tanker Kirki oil spill – 1991
- Moura coal mine explosion – 1994
- Xstrata's Oaky Creek coal mine, miner lost his life when vehicle was driven over the edge of the excavation due to the substandard condition of the workplace – 1996
- Laleham No1 coal mine, miner pinned between machinery resulting in death of miner – 1996
- Gretley coal mine disaster resulting in the death of 4 miners – 1996
- Newhill coal mine, rib collapse causing death to miner – 1997
- BHP's Blackwater Open Cut coal mine, vehicle incident resulting in death of miner – 1997
- Esso Longford gas plant explosion – 1998
- Mobil Port Stanvac Refinery oil spill – 1999
- Varanus Island Terminal oil spill – 1999
- Oil tanker Laura D'Amato oil spill – 1999
- Oil carrier Sylvan Arrow oil spill – 1999
- Cook coal mine coal dislodged resulting in death of miner – 2000
- Jellinabah Open Cut Coal incident causing severe crush injuries to miner – 2000
- Oaky coal mine roof fall causing death to miner – 2000
- Goonyella Riverside coal mine experienced a major structural failure resulting in serious injury to a miner – 2000
- Bulk carrier Global Peace oil spill at RG Tanner Coal loading facility in Gladstone in Queensland – 2006
- Yallourn Power Station Coal mine wall collapse (mine flooded by the Latrobe River) – 2007
- Venus Island gas pipeline explosion – 2008
- Santos Limited Port Bonython groundwater contamination (Crude oil leak from storage tanks enter the groundwater) – 2008–2012
- Montara Well Head Platform blowout and subsequent oil and gas spill – 2009
- Eastern Star Gas (taken over by Santos Ltd) Coal Stream Gas operation incident which resulted in 10,000 litres of toxic water waste entering the environment in the Pilliga State Forest – 2011
- Princes Highway closed after heavy resulted in land movement at the Hazelwood mine causing cracks in the road – 2011
- Springvale and Angus Place coal mines – Undertook unapproved coal mining and/or discharging mine groundwater into an environmentally sensitive area – 2011
- Collapse of the Morwell River Diversion at the Yallourn Coal Mine – 2012
- Santos Limited Jackson oil spill – 2013

== See also ==
- Mining accidents in Australia
