= Simes =

Simes is a surname. Notable people with the surname include:

- Dimitri Simes (born 1947), Russian businessman
- Jackie Simes (born 1942), American track cyclist
- Lisa Simes (born 1976), Canadian artistic gymnast
- Llamil Simes (died 1980), Argentine footballer
