= Putney High School =

All girls school in London

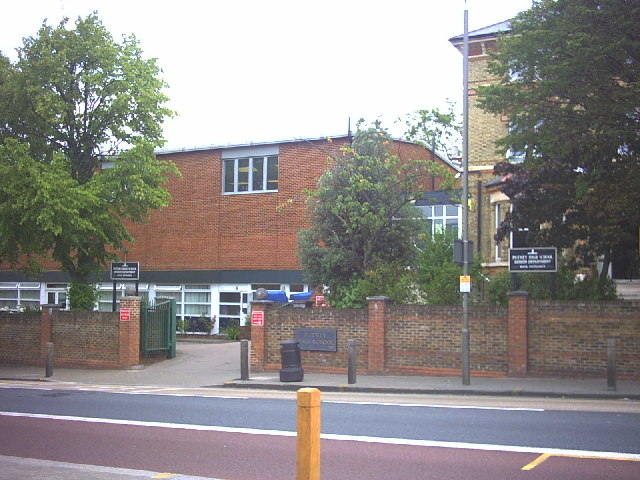

Location
- 35 Putney Hill; London, SW15 6BH; England; 51.45685°N 0.21806°W

Information
- Type: Private day school
- Motto: Fortiter et recte ("Bravely and rightly")
- Local authority: Wandsworth
- Department for Education URN: 101072 Tables
- Head teacher: Jo Sharrock
- Gender: Girls
- Age: 4 to 18
- Houses: Senior School: Hepburn, Ferrier, Burton and Stark Junior school: Johnson, Fonteyn, Kingsley and Nightingale
- Colours: Hepburn (Blue), Ferrier (Yellow) Burton (Green) Stark (Red) Johnson (Blue) Fonteyn (Green) Kingsley (yellow) Nightingale (red)
- Website: http://www.putneyhigh.gdst.net/

Putney High School, GDST is an independent girls' day school in Putney, London. Often referred to as simply Putney, the school admits students from the ages 4–18. Founded in 1893 it is a member of the Girls' Day School Trust, a union of 26 schools with 19,500 students and 3,500 staff. The school uniform is purple and has always been since a uniform was put in place. On average, in the junior school, there are 48 children in a year, 2 classes in a year and 24 in each class. In the senior school, there are about 25–27 in a class and each year has an intake of about 110, so 4 classes a year.

== Location and information ==
Formerly, there were four houses - Argyll, Cromwell, Fairfax and Pitt. Then there were three school houses - Austen, Bronte and Eliot - named after well-known female authors, all of whom felt that their sex gave them a disadvantage and used pseudonyms when writing. George Eliot lived for a time in Holly Lodge, Southfields, a house within walking distance of the Putney High School site. As of September 2013, the school uses an updated system of four houses, Ferrier, Stark, Hepburn and Burton, named after influential women all of whom were nominated by the students (Kathleen Ferrier, Freya Stark, Audrey Hepburn and Beryl Burton).

The school is situated on Putney Hill, a short walk from East Putney tube station (District Line) and Putney mainline station (Waterloo- Hounslow/Teddington/Windsor/Weybridge). It is well-served by buses, the 93, 14, 39 and 85.

== Good Schools Guide ==
According to the Good Schools Guide, the school maintains a "Positive, friendly but hardworking atmosphere with good balance of sport, art, music, etc. The girls seem fulfilled, confident and happy – well prepared for outside world."

== Administration ==
=== Senior School ===
The Headmistress of Putney High Senior School is Jo Sharrock.

=== Junior School ===
The head of the Junior School is Liz McLaughlin. This takes in years reception (4–5) to year six (10–11).

== Athletics ==
The school was named top girls' school in the country for sport in 2023. It is strong at sports, especially rowing, lacrosse, netball, gymnastics and athletics. In 2018 the school acquired a rowing boathouse on the Putney Embankment, becoming the first ever all girls boathouse on the Thames.

== Motto ==
The school motto is fortiter et recte, which means "boldly and rightly".

== Notable alumni ==
- Mary Adshead – artist
- Jessica Alexander – actress and model
- Milicent Bagot – first female Assistant Director of MI5
- Jenny Beavan – Academy Award-winning costume designer
- Virginia Bottomley – Conservative Party politician
- Camilla Cavendish – journalist
- Barbara Crocker - artist and author
- Olly Grender – Baroness Grender, Former Head of Communications for the Liberal Democrat Party
- Nicola Hicks – sculptor
- Emma Komlosy - singer and actress
- Aicha McKenzie - British gymnast, model, dancer, CEO of AMCK Group
- Ramita Navai – journalist and author
- Sandie Okoro – lawyer, senior vice-president of World Bank Group
- Ursula Owen – founder, Virago Press
- Melanie Phillips – journalist and author
- Olivia Poulet – actress
- Joan Rimmer – musicologist
- Edina Ronay – fashion designer
- Sophie Simnett – actress
- Elizabeth Symons, Baroness Symons of Vernham Dean
- Sophie Raworth – BBC TV newsreader
- Glenys Roberts - author and journalist, long time councillor for London’s West End
- Madeleine Wickham – novelist published under the pseudonym of Sophie Kinsella
