= 1979 in Australian television =

This article is a summary of 1979 in Australian television.

== Events ==
- February - The Government approves the application for ATV0 to convert its transmission to the Channel 10 frequency.
- 11 February - A brand new Australian weekly current affairs program 60 Minutes premieres on Nine Network. Based on the American newsmagazine television program of the same name, it has a lack lustre beginning, but will soon rise to become one of the highest-rating programs in Australia.
- 27 February - Australian prime time black comedy/soap opera from Reg Grundy Productions Prisoner premieres on the 0-10 Network. It enjoys a large following both in Australia and around the world, particularly in the UK and parts of the US.
- April - The Special Broadcasting Service screens the first of a series of multi-language programs on ABC on Sunday mornings.
- 2 April - Australian actor Ron Blanchard and Alexander Bunyip the delightful character from the popular children's book The Monster That Ate Canberra by Michael Salmon present a brand new afternoon block for children called ARVO which also features programs such as Play School, Mr. Squiggle and Friends, Sesame Street, Basil Brush and The Famous Five.
- 24 April - American prime time soap opera Dallas premieres on The 0-10 Network.
- 28 June - Australian drama series Patrol Boat debuts on ABC.
- 1 July - Commercial television stations now required to screen ‘C’ classified programming, aimed solely at children aged 6 to 13, every weekday between 4:00pm and 5:00pm. Early ‘C’ classified programs include Simon Townsend's Wonder World (0–10), Stax (Seven) and Shirl's Neighbourhood (Seven). Commercial stations are also required to screen a minimum of 30 minutes each weekday, prior to 4:00pm, of programming aimed at pre-school viewers.
- 9 July - Crawford Productions's brand new soap opera Skyways begins it premiere on the Seven Network.
- 13 August - A brand new Australian environmental education series for children called Earthwatch debuts on ABC at 5:00pm as part of the ARVO lineup.
- 2 October - American sitcom Diff'rent Strokes debuts on Nine Network.
- November - Media mogul Rupert Murdoch is taking control of TEN-10 Sydney and his bid to take over the Australian airline company which owns ATV0 Melbourne Ansett Australia, sparks a review into media ownership by the Australian Broadcasting Tribunal.
- 5 December - American sitcom Taxi premieres on Nine Network.

== Debuts ==
Program	Network	Debut date
60 Minutes	Nine Network	11 February
Doctor Down Under	Seven Network	12 February
Prisoner	The 0-10 Network	27 February
The Oracle	ABC	12 March
Golden Soak	ABC	13 March
Bailey's Bird	Seven Network	25 March
ARVO	ABC	2 April
Love Thy Neighbour in Australia	Seven Network	9 April
Patrol Boat	ABC	28 June
Carrots	Seven Network	2 July
Skyways	Seven Network	9 July
Ride on Stranger	ABC	15 July
Top Mates	ABC	16 July
Earthwatch	ABC	13 August
Simon Townsend's Wonder World	The 0-10 Network	3 September
Shirl's Neighbourhood	Seven Network	1979
Wombat	BTQ-7	1979
The World Around Us	Seven Network	1979

=== New international programming ===
- 7 January – (United Kingdom) The Kenny Everett Video Show (ABC)
- 7 January – (United Kingdom) All Creatures Great and Small (ABC)
- 8 January/7 May – (United Kingdom) Michael Bentine's Potty Time (8 January: Seven Network - Melbourne, 7 May: Seven Network - Sydney)
- 11 January/4 September – (United States) CHiPS (11 January: Seven Network - Melbourne, 4 September: Seven Network - Sydney)
- 13 January – (United States) Baggy Pants and the Nitwits (The 0-10 Network)
- 21 January – (New Zealand) The Governor (ABC)
- 24 January – (United Kingdom) Bagpuss (ABC)
- 1 February – (United Kingdom) Rumpole of the Bailey (ABC)
- 10 February/19 February – (United States) Mickey's 50 (10 February: Seven Network - Melbourne, 19 February: Nine Network - Sydney)
- 11 February – (United States) Vega$ (Nine Network)
- 15 February – (United States) The Incredible Hulk (1978) (Seven Network)
- 19 February – (United States) Mork and Mindy (Nine Network)
- 5 March – (Japan) Battle of the Planets (The 0-10 Network)
- 10 March – (United States) The Mumbly Cartoon Show (Nine Network)
- 21 March – (United States) Peark (The 0-10 Network)
- 24 March – (United States) The Secret Lives of Waldo Kitty (The 0-10 Network)
- 24 March – (United States) I Am the Greatest: The Adventures of Muhammad Ali (The 0-10 Network)
- 2 April – (United Kingdom) The Eagle of the Ninth (ABC)
- 19 April – (United States) Sword of Justice (The 0-10 Network)
- 24 April – (United States) Dallas (The 0-10 Network)
- 27 April – (United Kingdom) Blake's 7 (ABC)
- 8 May – (United Kingdom) Noah and Nelly in... SkylArk (ABC)
- 22 May – (United Kingdom) The Famous Five (1978) (ABC)
- 28 May – (United States) Roots: The Next Generations (The 0-10 Network)
- 31 May – (United States) Project U.F.O. (The 0-10 Network)
- 4 June – (United Kingdom) Danger UXB (ABC)
- 12 June – (United Kingdom) Lillie (Seven Network)
- 23 July – (United States) Dynomutt, Dog Wonder (Nine Network)
- 26 July – (United Kingdom) The Clifton House Mystery (ABC TV)
- 8 August – (New Zealand) Gather Your Dreams (ABC)
- 10 August/24 November – (United States) Salvage 1 (10 August: Nine Network - Melbourne, 24 November: Nine Network - Sydney)
- 3 September – (United Kingdom) 1990 (ABC)
- 21 September – (United States) Supertrain (Nine Network)
- 2 October – (United Kingdom) Hazell (ABC)
- 2 October – (United States) Diff'rent Strokes (Nine Network)
- 3 October – (United States) Angie (Nine Network)
- 11 October – (United Kingdom) Circus (ABC)
- 15 October – (United States) Yogi's Space Race (Nine Network)
- 19 October – (United Kingdom) Out of Bounds (ABC)
- 7 November – (United States) A Special Sesame Street Christmas (Seven Network)
- 18 November – (United Kingdom) Bless Me, Father (Seven Network)
- 19 November – (United States) WKRP in Cincinnati (Nine Network)
- 19 November – (Canada) SCTV (The 0-10 Network)
- 19 November – (United States) The Big Blue Marble (Nine Network)
- 21 November – (United States) Tennessee Tuxedo and His Tales (Seven Network)
- 21 November – (United States) Brothers and Sisters (Seven Network)
- 21 November – (United States) Joe & Valerie (Seven Network)
- 22 November – (United Kingdom) Return of the Saint (Seven Network)
- 24 November – (United States) David Cassidy: Man Undercover (Seven Network)
- 25 November – (United Kingdom) Mixed Blessings (Seven Network)
- 27 November – (United Kingdom) The Aphrodite Inheritance (ABC)
- 27 November – (United Kingdom) Disraeli (Seven Network)
- 5 December – (United States) Taxi (Nine Network)
- 11 December – (United Kingdom) Born and Bred (ABC)
- 13 December – (United Kingdom) Pennies from Heaven (ABC)
- 20 December – (United States) The Roller Girls (The 0-10 Network)
- 24 December – (United States) Christmas Eve on Sesame Street (ABC)

== Television shows ==
=== 1950s ===
- Mr. Squiggle and Friends (1959–1999)

=== 1960s ===
- Four Corners (1961–present)

=== 1970s ===
- Hey Hey It's Saturday (1971–1999, 2009–2010)
- Young Talent Time (1971–1988)
- Countdown (1974–1987)
- The Don Lane Show (1975–1983)
- This is Your Life (1975–1980)
- Chopper Squad (1976–1979)
- In the Wild (1976–1981)
- Glenview High (1977–1979)
- 60 Minutes (1979–present)
- Prisoner (1979–1986)
- Doctor Down Under (1979–1980)

== Ending this year ==
Date	Show	Channel	Debut
12 January	Cuckoo in the Nest	Seven Network	22 December 1978
18 February	Chopper Squad	The 0-10 Network	5 November 1976
24 February	Glenview High	Seven Network	27 September 1977
1979	ARVO	ABC	2 April 1979
1979	Super Flying Fun Show	Nine Network	1970

== See also ==
- 1979 in Australia
- List of Australian films of 1979
