= Aicha McKenzie =

British gymnast, model and dancer

Personal information
- Nationality: English
- Born: February 1977 (age 49) London, England
Medal record
Rhythmic gymnastics
Representing England
Commonwealth Games
Bronze medal – third place	1994 Victoria	ball
Bronze medal – third place	1994 Victoria	hoop
Bronze medal – third place	1994 Victoria	team all-around

Aicha Alicia McKenzie (born February 1977) is a former female British gymnast, model and dancer who is also the CEO of AMCK Management, which founded AMCK Dance in 2005, AMCK Models in 2008 and AMCK Fit in June 2017. She is widely regarded as a leader in the entertainment field.

== Early life ==
McKenzie was born in London in 1977. She is an alumna of Putney High School, GDST in South-West London. Age 17, McKenzie won three rhythmic gymnastics bronze medals at the 1994 Commonwealth Games in Victoria, British Columbia, Canada, narrowly missing out on qualifying for the 1996 Summer Olympics in Atlanta.

McKenzie was also a dancer for Take That during their performance at the first EMA's in Berlin in 1994.

== Career ==
AMCK Dance is the exclusive agency providing talent for the MTV EMA shows for over 15 years. They regularly work with artists such as Dua Lipa, Beyonce, Rihanna, Kendrick Lamar, Madonna and Janet Jackson. McKenzie's first major project was Kanye West's 'Golddigger' promotional campaign which was featured in the 2006 Brit Awards. McKenzie worked on the Christian Louboutin's 20th Anniversary hologram film with Dita Von Teese which was showcased in London in 2012, as well as choreographing fashion shows as part of London Fashion Week.

McKenzie was also responsible for choreographing 300 Olympic dancers during the London 2012 Olympic Games at the beach volleyball, gymnastics, taekwondo and boxing venues. She was also the choreographer for the MTV European Music Awards for several years. McKenzie also choreographed the opening ceremony for the 2015 Rugby World Cup final at Twickenham. In 2022 she was a resident choreographer at the Commonwealth Games Birmingham for the beach volleyball, gymnastics, badminton and basketball venues.

AMCK MODELS was the first male-based modelling agency in London. They have secured campaigns with designers such as Givenchy, Burberry, Alexander McQueen and Prada. AMCK challenges the industries perception of what male beauty means today, and focus on signing boys that eschew stereotypes.

In 2017, AMCK Fit was also launched, acting as a wellness concierge service to the creative industries. They have hosted events with companies including Vogue House, Soho House and Sony Music.

McKenzie has made many TV appearances as a judge on MTV reality dance shows MTV Shakedown and Sweet Sixteen, ITV's Dancing on Ice, Britains Next Top Model, Trouble TV's Bump and Grind, Extreme Makeover and the BBC's The Best in Town.

In 2020, Aicha McKenzie received her Breath Coach Accreditation, and teaches breath techniques via Instagram and Zoom.

On 22.2.22, AMCK Group launched a collection of 222 NFTs featuring a selection of AMCK talent. Each talent featured will receive royalties from the sale of their artwork in perpetuity. Symbolically, pieces from the 22.2.22: Genesis collection were put on sale for £250 - around the traditional day rate for a dancer.

== Achievements & Recognition ==
In 2013, McKenzie was one of fifty women to be invited to 10 Downing Street for the Power List reception, where she was recognised as one of Britain's most influential black people. In 2019, McKenzie became The Black British Business Awards' (BBBAs) senior leader for the Consumer and Luxury category as CEO of the AMCK Group.
