= Rebecca Stoyel =

Australian gymnast

- Born: 4 April 1979 (age 47) Adelaide, Australia

Gymnastics career
- Discipline: Women's artistic gymnastics
- Country represented: Australia
- Club: South Australian Sports Institute
Medal record
Representing Australia
Commonwealth Games
Gold medal – first place	1994 Victoria	Uneven bars
Silver medal – second place	1994 Victoria	All-around
Bronze medal – third place	1994 Victoria	Team

Rebecca Stoyel (born 4 April 1979) is an Australian former artistic gymnast. She is the 1994 Commonwealth Games uneven bars champion, all-around silver medalist, and team bronze medalist.

== Gymnastics career ==
Stoyel won the junior all-around title at the 1992 Australian Championships in addition to winning the junior team, vault, and floor exercise titles. She withdrew from the 1994 Australian Championships due to a broken hand, and she withdrew from the 1994 World Championships after breaking her foot on a balance beam dismount. She returned to competition at the 1994 Commonwealth Games. She competed alongside Joanna Hughes, Ruth Moniz, and Salli Wills and won the team bronze medal behind England and Canada. In the individual all-around, Stoyel earned a total score of 38.037 and won the silver medal behind Canada's Stella Umeh. In the vault final, she scored a 9.356 and finished in sixth place. Then in the uneven bars final, she won the gold medal with a score of 9.525. Finally, she competed in the floor exercise final where she finished eighth with a score of 8.887.

Stoyel broke her foot again prior to the 1996 Olympics and retired from competition and began working as a coach.
