= Road tax =

Tax paid for use of a vehicle on roads

Road tax, known by various names around the world, is a tax which has to be paid on, or included with, a motorised vehicle to use it on a public road.

== National implementations ==
=== Australia ===
Road tax in Australia was a charge calculated on a per ton, per mile basis on goods vehicles until the Razorback Blockade which occurred in April 1979. Road tax was abolished in response to the blockade and was replaced by fuel excise and changes to the vehicle registration costs.

All states and territories require an annual vehicle registration fee to be paid in order to use a vehicle on public roads; the cost of which varies from state to state and is dependent on the type of vehicle. The fee is known colloquially as 'rego' (pronounced with a soft g, short for registration). Queensland road tax is based on the number of cylinders or rotors the vehicle's engine has. There is also a small traffic improvement fee. New South Wales road tax is paid based on the vehicle's tare weight.

=== Belgium ===
Passenger cars pay a registration fee based on the engine displacement and power output (degressive towards 2014 (66% in 2012, 33% in 2013, 0% in 2014) and environmental criteria such as CO_{2} g/km output (increasingly towards 2014). The more CO_{2} g/km the car produces, the higher the fee will be.

Every year, the plate number owner has to pay the annual road tax contribution. This tax is based on the engine displacement (0-799cc = fiscal HP 4, above 800cc each 200cc is one class higher). Due to CO_{2}-based regulations, diesel cars with above average displacement (>2,000cc) are favoured, and petrol cars with bigger displacements are put at a disadvantage). A supplementary annual fee has to be paid for cars that run on LPG/CNG (0-799cc: €84/year, 800–2,499cc; €148/year and >2,500cc: €208/year) to compensate financial loss for the state due to the absence of excise at the pump.

=== Brazil ===
In Brazil, the states may collect an annual Vehicle Licensing Fee (Taxa de Licenciamento Veicular) which has a fixed value for each vehicle category determined by each state. In addition, each state may impose a Vehicle Property Tax (Imposto sobre a Propriedade de Veículos Automotores), with a rate up to 4%.

=== Costa Rica ===
The Costa Rican car property tax, commonly referred to as Marchamo, is among the highest in Latin America, with rates that can go up to 3.5% of the fiscal value of the vehicle yearly. When compared to the Costa Rican minimum wage (₡331,516.22 a month, equivalent to US$597.33), the tax on an average US$15,000 (₡8,600,000) car can be ₡302,000 (US$525), or 80% to 120% of a month's pay. Even though Costa Ricans receive a yearly bonus equivalent to a month's salary, the property tax negates this for most car owners, which has led to calls for tax law reform.

Opponents to the car property tax argue that common cars already pay 100% tariff when imported, meaning that a car in Costa Rica is twice as expensive as in the country of origin. Additionally, gas refills include 65% fuel tax. Owning a car that would cost US$7,500 to purchase (in the United States) for seven years can result in the owner paying up to US$29,595 in total taxes (around US$4,227.85 a year). The Ministry of Finance also has the right to step up the fiscal value of a car, effectively a negative depreciation.

=== Estonia ===
The yearly motor vehicle tax (Mootorsõidukimaks) was implemented in 2025. Vehicles first registered at least 20 years ago to the date are only taxed at the flat basic rate of €50 per year, tax for newer vehicles is in addition to the €50 calculated based on CO_{2} emission per WLTP standards (€3 per gramme between 118-150 grammes, €3.50 per gramme between 151-200 grammes and €4 per gramme for over 201 grammes) and GVWR (€0.40 for every kilogramme over 2000 kilogrammes, up to €400). If the CO_{2} emission is instead given in NEDC standards, the price based on emission will be multiplied with a coefficient of 1.21. If the CO_{2} emission is not given, then the tax rate will be calculated by adding the engine power in kilowatts multiplied by 0.29 and the vehicle's curb weight in kilogrammes multiplied by 0.07.

=== France ===
In France, the vignette was abolished for private vehicles in 2001 and was replaced by a tax on toll-road operators at a rate of €6.85 per 1,000 kilometres travelled. In addition, a tax is levied on vehicles registered to companies. Since 2006, the tax is levied according to CO_{2} emissions ranging from €2 per gramme to €19 per gramme.

=== Germany ===
In Germany, the Motor Vehicle tax (Kraftfahrzeugsteuer) is an annual tax on all vehicles. It ranges from €5 per 100cc to €25 per 100cc for petrol engines and €13 to €37 for diesel engines. Vehicles first registered before June 30, 2009 are taxed according to engine displacement and national/European emission class, whereas vehicles which were registered after that date are taxed solely based on CO_{2} emission in grams per km (g CO_{2}/km). An on-line tax calculator has been made available. The CO_{2} Price is up to 4 Euros per gram.

=== Hong Kong ===
In Hong Kong, the licence fee is according to the category (passenger cars, goods vehicles, taxis, etc.) of the vehicle first. Then, for passenger cars (known as private cars), it is calculated by the engine size. The lowest tax band is under 1500 cc, then the tax band changes at 2500 cc, 3500 cc and 4500 cc. Due to this system of license fee, most of 1600 cc to 1800 cc car models do not sell well. Most people prefer 1500 cc for compact cars. Due to this reason, some manufacturers provide only the 1500 cc version of their compact cars to Hong Kong market such as Toyota Corolla and Nissan Tiida. Both of these two cars only have 1500 cc version available.

By engine displacement:

- ≤ 1500 cc = HK$3,929
- 1501 cc- 2500 cc = HK$5,794
- 2501 cc- 3500 cc = HK$7,664
- 3501 cc- 4500 cc = HK$9,534
- >4500 cc = HK$11,329

=== Hungary ===
In Hungary, since 2009, this tax is based on the vehicle's engine performance and the vehicle's age. Before this so-called performance tax, this tax was based on the vehicle's weight and unofficially it was called a weight tax.

=== India ===
In India, road tax is imposed by the respective state governments (lifetime and also annual for commercial vehicles) also, further there could be toll for specific usage of roads (charge depends on distance, type, etc.). At the time of purchase of the vehicle, the government levies GST (Goods & Services Tax) at the rate of 28% and additional cess is levied based on the cubic capacity of the engine of the vehicle(1% for small cars with CC< 1200 CC, 3% for CC between 1200 and 1500 CC, 15% for above 1500 CC). Electric cars are levied lower tax of 5%.

The motor vehicles tax (called road tax) is calculated on the basis of various factors including engine capacity, seating capacity, unladen weight and cost price. Each state has different rules and regulations for charging the road tax.

There is proposal to have uniform rules and also tariffs across the country in line with the government's initiative of having "One Nation-One Tax".

In India, there is a movement called "Digital India" for digitalizing labor in every department and the Ministry of Road Transport & Highways has created a portal called "Vahan" for online road tax payment to ease the payment of taxes.

=== Ireland ===
Vehicle registration tax applies to all new car registrations as well as imports. VRT for private cars is based on CO_{2} emissions as well as NO_{x} emissions.

Motor tax is payable as an annual duty (subject to exemptions) in Ireland. Prior to 2008, the annual tax levy was based on the engine size, and was ranging from €199 pa for <1,000 cc to €1,809 for >3,001 cc. Private cars registered after July 2008 are taxed at the tax rates based on the vehicle's carbon dioxide emissions. The tax bands for CO_{2} emissions range from €120 pa for 0-80 g/km to €2,350 pa for >225 g/km. Commercial vehicle tax is based on GVW, regardless of engine size or CO_{2} emissions, and range from €333 to €900 pa. Vintage vehicles are taxed at €56 pa; a vehicle is considered vintage 30 years after the date of its first registration.

=== Israel ===
Combustion engine cars base purchase tax is 83% plus 7% customs tax for manufacturers from countries with no treaty with Israel plus VAT of 17% and optional "prestige tax" of 2.9% to 18% for high cost cars. This brings total tax on a new car to around 100%. Hybrid engine cars base tax is 45%, and electric cars base tax is 10%. "How come Tesla is so cheap".

=== Italy ===
As of 2023, road taxes in Italy are classified by tax horsepower and European emission standards.

=== Japan ===
A tax is collected under the Local Tax Act of 1950 that is paid every May based on the vehicle's engine's displacement. The tax is then determined by whether the vehicle is for business or personal use. Brackets are determined based on exterior dimensions and engine displacement as defined under the dimension regulations. The tax to be paid is then based on the engine's displacement starting with engines below 1,000 cc, and increasing at 500 cc intervals to a top bracket of 6,000 cc and above.

Personal vehicles pay more than vehicles identified as business use. If the car has been certified as a low-emissions vehicle, under the Japanese low-emission vehicle certification system, the tax obligation is reduced. Kei cars (Japanese vehicles with 660 cc engines and reduced exterior dimensions) have significant tax advantages because their tax is about a quarter of that of a 1,000 cc car.

The legislation is similar to a European approach to taxing engine horsepower, while the Japanese approach taxes engine displacement.

==== Automobile Tax (exterior dimensions) ====
- Road Tax for regular 4-wheel vehicles (Metropolitan/Prefectural Tax) vehicle plates and taxes
  - 40/400 and 50/500 Japan license plates: ¥7,500
  - 33/300 license plates (4.5-litre engines and below): ¥19,000
  - 33/300 license plates (4.6-litre engines and above): ¥22,000
  - 11/100 license plates: ¥32,000

Light Motor Vehicle Tax

- Road Tax for mini-cars and motorcycles (city/ward tax)
  - Kei car: ¥3,000
  - Motorcycles up to 125 cc: ¥500
  - Motorcycles 125 and above cc: ¥1,000

==== Automobile Weight Tax ====
On 31 May 1971 until 31 March 2010, the Japanese government passed a law creating the Automobile Weight Tax (in Japanese). It was modified on 31 March 2010, and the next day, on 1 April 2010. The tax is paid every year in conjunction with the engine displacement based road tax. The weight determination is made in tonnes.

Vehicle class	Tax amount
motorcycle	¥1,500
kei car	¥2,500
passenger car	¥5,000 per tonne
truck	¥2,500 per tonne

As of 1 April 2010, the tax requirements are as follows. The determination of whether the vehicle is for business or personal use has been added, similar to the engine displacement regulations:

Vehicle class	Personal use	Business use
motorcycle	¥2,200	¥1,600
kei car (125~250cc)	¥5,500	¥4,300
new kei car	¥11,300	¥8,100
renewal kei car	¥3,800	¥2,700
passenger car	¥10,000 per tonne	¥5,400 per tonne
truck (commercial vehicle)	¥3,800 per tonne	¥5,400 per tonne
bus	¥5,000 per tonne	¥2,700 per tonne

==== 31 March 2010 ====
Vehicle class	Personal use	Business use
motorcycle	¥2,500	¥1,700
kei two wheel(126~250cc)	¥6,300	¥4,500
new kei car	¥13,200	¥8,400
renewal kei car	¥4,400	¥2,800
passenger car	¥12,600 per tonne	¥5,600 per tonne
truck (commercial vehicle)	¥4,400 per tonne	¥2,800 per tonne
bus	¥6,300 per tonne	¥2,800 per tonne

==== Road Tax increments ====
The following is the tax rates for passenger vehicles used for both personal and business use, incremented by 500 cc engine displacement.

Total displacement	Personal use	Business use
under 1-litre	¥29,500	¥7,500
1-litre–1.4-litres	¥34,500	¥8,500
1.5-litres–1.9-litres	¥39,500	¥9,500
2.0-litres–2.4-litres	¥45,000	¥13,800
2.5-litres–2.9-litres	¥51,000	¥15,700
3.0-litres–3.4-litres	¥58,000	¥17,900
3.5-litres–3.9-litres	¥66,500	¥20,500
4.0-litres-4.4-litres	¥76,500	¥23,600
4.5-litres–5.9-litres	¥88,000	¥27,200
6-litres and larger	¥111,000	¥40,700

The following table is the tax bracket for lorries or vehicles built with a load carrying section without seats and a single bench seat in the front of the vehicle in an enclosed passenger compartment.

Load capacity	Personal use	Business use
under 1 tonne	¥8,000	¥6,500
1 ton - under 2 tonnes	¥11,500	¥9,500
2 tons - under 3 tonnes	¥16,000	¥12,000
3 tons - under 4 tonnes	¥20,500	¥15,000
4 tons - under 5 tonnes	¥25,500	¥18,500
5 tons - under 6 tonnes	¥30,000	¥22,000
6 tons - under 7 tonnes	¥35,000	¥25,500
7 tons - under 8 tonnes	¥40,500	¥29,500
over 8 tonnes	¥40,500 + ¥6,300 for each additional tonne	¥29,500 + ¥4,700 for each additional tonne

The following table is the tax bracket for buses, or vehicles designed to carry many passengers.

Load capacity	Personal use	Business use
30 or less	¥33,000	¥12,000
under 40	¥41,000	¥14,500
under 50	¥49,000	¥17,500
under 60	¥57,000	¥20,000
under 70	¥65,500	¥22,500
under 80	¥74,000	¥25,500
80 and over	¥83,000	¥29,000

=== Latvia ===
The vehicle operating tax on cars first registered after January 1, 2005 that have registration certificates with information on total weight, engine volume and engine maximum power, shall be paid by summing up tax rates according to total weight, engine volume and engine maximum power of the car as follows:

- By total weight
  - ≤1500 kg €14,23
  - 1501 kg - 1800 kg €29,88
  - 1801 kg - 2100 kg €51,22
  - 2101 kg - 2600 kg €65,45
  - 2601 kg - 3000 kg €78,26
  - 3001 kg - 3500 kg €91,06
  - > 3500 kg €102,45
- By engine volume
  - ≤ 1500cc €8,54
  - 1501cc- 2000cc €21,34
  - 2001cc- 2500cc €34,15
  - 2501cc- 3000cc €51,22
  - 3001cc- 3500cc €85,37
  - 3501cc- 4000cc €149,40
  - 4001cc- 5000cc €213,43
  - >5000cc €277,46
- By engine maximum power
  - ≤ 55 kW €8,54
  - 56 kW - 92 kW €21,34
  - 93 kW - 129 kW €34,15
  - 130 kW - 166 kW €51,22
  - 167 kW - 203 kW €85,37
  - 204 kW - 240 kW €149,40
  - 241 kW - 300 kW €213,43
  - > 300 kW €277,46

=== Luxembourg ===
An annual tax is applied to each vehicle. In 2013, as an example, the annual tax for a BMW 330D 2004 model was €224.

=== Malaysia ===
In Malaysia, the latest road tax information and calculations is different in East Malaysia and West Malaysia, which the former in general has lower rate than the latter because of the poor geographical condition and road surface. Besides, within both the two areas, the tax amount also varies according to car variants as well as engine capacity.

Private cars are classified as ‘saloon’ vehicles such as hatchbacks, convertibles and sedans, whose road tax rate is different from non-saloon vehicles such as MPV, SUV or pickup trucks.

Also, "company-registered saloon" will have to pay higher tax than the "private-registered saloon" for the same engine displacement. Which does not applied to 'non-saloon'.

=== Mexico ===
Until 2011, the federal government charged an annual vehicle tax, Tenencia Vehicular, depending on the value and other vehicle characteristics. Although the tax was federal, the states collected the tax. This tax was created in 1961 and in 2006 represented about 1.6% of the total tax income (around 13 billion pesos).

In 2012, vehicle tax became a state matter with some states charging the tax, others charging a partial tax (mostly on cars above a certain value) and others such as Morelos and Querétaro, charging no tax.

=== Netherlands ===
In the Netherlands, a tax is applied to the vehicle based on its weight and fuel type, and the region. Electric vehicles and classic cars over forty years old are exempt from road tax.

=== Nepal ===
In Nepal, vehicle tax is collected by Transport Management Offices and Transport Management Service Offices. These offices come under Province governments. Hence vehicle tax is charged in different provinces in different rates. However, the basic criteria are set by federal law, which is same for all provinces. Owner has to pay tax in every fiscal year as per the rates determined in fiscal act passed by Province Assembly for that fiscal year. The owner has to pay tax before the renewal date or April 15 of every fiscal year, whichever comes first. There is no penalty for paying tax within 3 months after deadline. Then, 5% fine is applied within one month, 10% for subsequent one and half month, then 20% for the fiscal year and 32% after the fiscal year. Vehicle tax rate is dependent on displacement capacity (cc) of engine, Vehicle type (private, government, rented, corporate, or tourist use) and size of vehicle (Motorcycle, Car, Jeep, delivery Van and so on.)

Income tax is also collected from vehicle registered for rent every year. The rate is determined by Income Tax Act. Vehicle Registration fee, renew fee, vehicle fitness test fee, pollution test fee, route permit fee and other applicable fees are also collected as per the vehicle and transport management act of related provinces.

=== New Zealand ===
In New Zealand, Road tax is collected in two major ways.

Motorized vehicles to be used on public roads are required to hold a time based vehicle license that can be purchased for period of 3 to 12 months. Cost varies by vehicle type, fuel and usage. In the case of motorcycles the cost varies by engine size also.

Petroleum (incl ethanol bends), Automotive LPG & Automotive CNG (Which is now largely unavailable), have road tax collected at source, and as such, the retail price of such fuels contains Road tax. Refunds are available on the tax component of fuel used commercially offroad (i.e. Commercial lawnmowing), and fuel used in vehicles paying RUC's (i.e. USA sourced motorhome over 3500kg with petrol engine). Of note, refunds are not available for most non commercial use (such as recreational boating).

Fuels (Petroleum (incl ethanol belnds), Diesel & Biodiesel), sold in the Auckland region have an additional regional fuel tax applied. This is proposed to be removed on 30 June 2024.

Non exempt vehicles using fuels not taxed at source (such as Diesel & Hydrogen), or over 3500kg Gross Laden Weight pay road user charges (RUC) by distance travelled and vehicle weight & configuration band. All light vehicles are in the same 3500kg or Less GVM are in same weight band, but rates are highly varied for heavy vehicles based on vehicle type, weight and axle configuration.

Several exemptions apply to RUC's above

- Light electric vehicles (incl Plug in Hybrids) are exempt until 31 March 2024. (When it is proposed that Pure EV's will pay the full light vehicle RUC rate, and PHEV's will pay a discounted rate of NZD53 per 1000km unit (+Admin fee). It is proposed that PHEV's will not be allowed to claim back road tax in the petroleum they burn, in contrast to other vehicle types liable for RUC's)
- Heavy electric vehicles, incl PHEV are exempt until 32 December 2025.
- Vehicles unsuitable for regular road use (such as forklifts)
- Vehicles used almost exclusively offroad (such as an industrial vehicle)

New Zealand has three toll roads. These are publicly owned, and a per use fee is collected via an electronic free flow tolling system (Number plate detection).

A Clean Car Standard is in place, which charges fees to importers of road vehicles which exceed a defined fleet average emissions value.

Previously, a Clean Car Discount was levied on high fuel consumption vehicles, nicknamed a "ute tax", to cross-subsidise electric and fuel-efficient vehicles. This was discontinued at the end or the 2023 year.

=== Norway ===
In Norway, a one-off registration tax must be paid upon initial registration of any motor vehicle in Norway. The fee is calculated according to the vehicle's tax group, kerb weight, emissions (CO_{2} and NO_{x}) and engine volume.

Historically, cars in Norway were taxed annually according to an annual motor vehicle tax stipulated by the Norwegian Tax Administration according to the vehicle's type and weight class. The annual motor vehicle tax was replaced by the road traffic insurance tax which came into effect on 1 January 2018 and is paid through the yearly compulsory liability insurance for motor vehicles.

While commonly referred to as a "veiavgift" ("road tax"), no road tax has ever existed in Norway.

Tax rate for 2020 The tax must be paid in the following amounts (NOK) per day:
Vehicle type	NOK per day
Car w/ weight below 7500 kg	8,12
Car w/ weight below 7500 kg, diesel engine without factory installed particle filter	9,47
Motorcycle	5,65
Veteran, moped, tractor, taxi (registered), and others	1,31

=== Romania ===
==== Annual Vehicle Property Tax ====
In Romania, every owner that owns a registered vehicle owes a yearly property tax, 'Impozit', on that vehicle which is mainly based on the engine's Cubic capacity for passenger cars and buses. Regarding Trucks and Semi-trailer trucks, it is also affected by the number of Axles.

Although the template for the collection of vehicle property tax depending on the vehicle's type is drafted by the national government, the property tax is owed to the local government in which the vehicle is currently registered and the local council can vote to reduce or to increase the tax owed by a margin (for example, in the year 2018, the local council of the Municipality of Timișoara voted to increase the owed vehicle property tax by 50%, effectively making it the highest in the country)

The framework for calculating the basic vehicle property tax is the following:

National Template for Vehicle Property Tax collection
	I. Vehicles Registered Nationally (almost all vehicles fit into this category)	Amount owed in RON per each 200 cc
1.	Motorcycles, three-wheeled vehicles, quadracycles, and regular vehicles with a cubic capacity < 1600 cc	8
2.	Motorcycles, three-wheeled vehicles, quadracycles with a cubic capacity ≥ 1600 cc	9
3.	Regular vehicles with a cubic capacity between 1601 cc and 2000 cc	18
4.	Regular vehicles with a cubic capacity between 2001 cc and 2600 cc	72
5.	Regular vehicles with a cubic capacity between 2601 cc and 3000 cc	144
6.	Regular vehicles with a cubic capacity ≥ 3001 cc	290
7.	Buses and minibuses	24
8.	Other mechanically powered vehicles having a Maximum Authorized Mass not exceeding 12 tons. (Utility Vehicles, mainly small vehicles designed to also transport goods like pickup trucks, small platform trucks and others which don't fit the definition of a regular vehicle)	30
9.	Tractors	18
	II. Vehicles Registered with the Local Commune (mainly farming vehicles, these vehicles cannot travel outside the commune limits)	Amount owed in RON per each 200 cc
1.	Vehicles with a cubic capacity ≤ 4800 cc	2 - 4
2.	Vehicles with a cubic capacity ≥ 4801 cc	4 - 6
3.	Vehicles for which the cubic capacity is not known or specified	50 - 150 RON/year

For example: The owner of a normal gasoline-powered vehicle with an engine of 2000 cc, registered in the mun. of Cluj-Napoca (where there is a 0% markup) will have to pay a yearly vehicle property tax of 180 RON. (Rate: 18 RON/200cc, 2000 / 200 = 10, 18 ⋅ 10 = 180 RON). Meanwhile, someone who lives in the Mun. of Timișoara and owns a vehicle that has the same capacity will pay 274 RON (Timișoara has a 50% markup).

Another example of a vehicle with a cubic capacity of 3000, registered in Alba county, which has a 16.05% markup: Rate: 144 RON/200cc, 3000 / 200 = 15. Normal Tax owed: 15 ⋅ 144 = 2160. Tax owed in Alba county (16.05% markup): 2160 ⋅ 116.05/100 ≈ 2507 RON.

This system of taxation results in incredibly high taxes for vehicles with engines bigger than 3000 cc (Upwards of 6000 RON per year), and low taxes for engines smaller than 2000 cc. As a result, many people have tried to dodge the system either by registering their vehicles in another EU country with smaller taxes, or by converting their vehicles to fit the legal definition of a Utility Vehicle, which is included in category 8 and have a rate of only 30 RON / 200cc instead of 290 RON / 200cc. For example, the owner of a vehicle that has a cubic capacity of 4000 cc will have to pay 5800 RON per year, compared to 480 RON per year owed by someone who owns a pickup truck (also a Utility Vehicle) with the same cubic capacity of 4000. The main legal requirement for a vehicle to be considered a Utility Vehicle is that it must have a cargo area that is separated from the passengers and cannot be accessed from within the vehicle. Many passenger cars (especially SUVs) can easily be modified to fit this requirement by installing a barrier between the trunk area and the back seats.

Hybrid vehicles owners will pay a reduced tax (50% to 100% reduction). Electric vehicle and Classic car owners will pay no tax at all. All vehicle owners get a 10% reduction if they pay the tax before May 1 (which is the deadline for paying the vehicle tax). Physically impaired people and war veterans do not owe any vehicle property tax no matter the vehicle type.

==== Rovinieta ====
On top of paying an annual Vehicle Property Tax, all vehicles that travel outside of city limits must pay the "Rovinieta", including internationally registered vehicles that travel temporarily on Romanian roads which ranges from 28 Euros a year for passenger cars to 1210 Euros for Trucks that have a Maximum Authorized Mass greater than 12 t and more than 4 axles. Classic cars are exempt from the Rovinieta.

=== Spain ===
In Spain two taxes apply to motor vehicles:

1. The registration tax (impuesto de matriculation) applies at purchase time to the purchase price. It is a national tax and the rate varies from 0% to 14.75% depending on CO_{2} emissions. In some cases regions may fix their own rates.
2. The mechanical vehicle circulation tax (Impuesto sobre Vehículos de Tracción Mecánica or IVTM) is an annual tax. The tax is a municipal tax whose rate varies widely across the country. The tax is calculated according to the tax horsepower of the vehicle. In Madrid and Barcelona the rates for 2011 ranged from €22 for up to 8 HP to €224 for vehicles with over 20 HP.

=== United Kingdom ===
In the United Kingdom it is a requirement to pay Vehicle Excise Duty (VED), which is commonly called road tax or vehicle tax, this is paid annually to the government for a vehicle licence. Previously, vehicle licences in the form of paper tax discs were required to be displayed on vehicles, and this licence would remain valid until its expiry date even if the vehicle was transferred to another keeper. The paper tax discs were abolished in October 2014, meaning that the licence is merely an entry in the centralised database; moreover, following this change the tax is cancelled if the vehicle is transferred. Vehicles that are not used or kept on public roads must be the subject of a Statutory Off-Road Notification (SORN) if they are unlicensed.

In 1937, the direct relationship that existed between the tax and government expenditure on public roads was cut, the proceeds being treated as general taxation. In the 2015 budget, the government announced that the revenue would once again be used directly to maintain the roads, for the first time since 1937. In the 2018 budget, the government announced a National Roads Fund which would ring-fence VED in England for the improvement of roads. However, it was announced in 2024 that this policy had been cancelled.

=== United States ===
Each state requires an annual motor vehicle registration fee which varies from state to state.

Additionally, in Illinois, municipalities are allowed to also impose a vehicle registration fee (known alternatively as a vehicle license, vehicle sticker or a wheel tax depending on the municipality) and collect the funds directly. Chicago, Evanston, Skokie, and a number of suburbs in Chicagoland have their own annual vehicle registration fee. The annual fees vary by municipality and type of vehicle. As of 2025, most of the municipalities with required vehicle registration fees in Illinois require a municipality-specific sticker to be affixed to the front windshield if the vehicle has one. Cook County, Illinois had taxed vehicles that were registered in unincorporated areas until the tax was repealed in 2023. More than forty municipalities in Illinois, mostly in Chicagoland, have eliminated or suspended vehicle registration programs since 1990.

In Massachusetts, the excise tax is billed separately from registration fees, by the town or city in which the vehicle is registered, and was set at the rate of $25 per $1,000 of valuation by a 1980 law called Proposition 2½. The towns and cities are required by state law to bill and collect the excise tax.

The state of Wisconsin allows counties and municipalities to collect an annual municipal or county vehicle registration fee (known as a wheel tax) also, but not directly. These fees are collected by the state of Wisconsin on behalf of the counties and municipalities at the time of registration renewal.

Within some states, the fees may vary from county to county, as some counties have surcharges per vehicle; an example of this is Virginia's personal property tax. New York State, on the other hand, charges a tax based on the vehicle's weight, rather than on its value, which is charged at the time of registration renewal.

In California and New Hampshire, the registration tax is calculated by the current value of the vehicle. As a result, older and more inexpensive vehicles will have a low registration fee, whereas newer and more expensive vehicles will have fees in the hundreds of dollars.

There is also a federal Heavy Vehicle Use Tax (HVUT) or truck tax, for vehicles with gross weights of 55,000 pounds or more, including trucks, truck tractors and buses. Generally, vans, pickup trucks, panel trucks and the like are not subject to this tax. The tax does not apply to vehicles that are used for 5,000 miles or less (7,500 miles or less for agricultural vehicles) on public highways during a tax period.

Additionally, "New York State imposes a highway use tax (HUT) on motor carriers operating certain motor vehicles on New York State public highways (excluding toll-paid portions of the New York State Thruway). The tax rate is based on the weight of the motor vehicle and the method that you choose to report the tax."

== See also ==
- Car costs
- Congestion pricing
- Taxation in Germany § Tax on benefits in kind, taxation of company cars used privately
- Toll road
