= Robert Barber (gymnast) =

British artistic gymnast

Gymnastics career
- Discipline: Men's artistic gymnastics
- Country represented: England
Medal record
Men's artistic gymnastics
Representing England
Commonwealth Games
Bronze medal – third place	1994 Victoria	Team

Robert Barber is a male former British gymnast.

== Gymnastics career ==
Barber represented England in the all-around event and horizontal bar and won a bronze medal in the team event, at the 1994 Commonwealth Games in Victoria, British Columbia, Canada.
