= Phil Motherwell =

Australian actor and playwright

Phil Motherwell (30 December 1946 – 9 November 2014) is an Australian actor and playwright.

Motherwell's theatre career included writing and acting in Dreamers of the Absolute (Pram Factory, 1978), Held in Camera (La Mama, 1986), and Fitzroy Crossing (La Mama, 1987). and writing and directing Nightshift, consisting of three plays, The Fitzroy Yank, The Native Rose and Steal Away Home (La Mama (2008). Acting appearances include in A Blue Freckle (Carlton Courthouse, 1990) Love Me Tender (CUB Malthouse, 1993),

His screen roles include Apostasy, Pure Shit, Stir, Bloodlust, and Everynight ... Everynight.
