= Adrian Rainey =

Irish rugby league footballer

Personal information
- Born: 6 January 1979 (age 47) Antrim, County Antrim, Northern Ireland

Playing information
- Position: Prop, Second-row
Club
Years	Team	Pld	T	G	FG	P
1998	Western Suburbs	13	2	0	0	8
2001	Parramatta Eels	2	0	0	0	0
2002	Castleford Tigers	11	1	0	0	4
2002	Hull Kingston Rovers	1	0	0	0	0
2004	Canterbury Bulldogs	1	0	0	0	0
	Total	28	3	0	0	12

Adrian Rainey (born 6 January 1979) is a former professional rugby league footballer who played for the Western Suburbs, Parramatta Eels and the Bulldogs in the National Rugby League (NRL), plus Castleford Tigers in the Super League.

== Playing career ==
Rainey, who played his junior football at Eagle Vale, started his NRL career with Western Suburbs. A forward, Rainey made 13 first-grade appearances in his debut season in 1998 and earned the club's "rookie of the year" award. However, in the off-season he tested positive to the anabolic steroid stanozolol and received a two-year ban.

Returning from his ban in 2001, Rainey resumed his NRL career with Parramatta, where he played mostly in the reserves, with only two-first grade appearances. In 2002, Rainey had a stint in England playing for the Castleford Tigers, then from 2003 to 2004 played for Canterbury. Rainey's only first-grade game for Canterbury came in the club's 2004 premiership winning season.

Rainey was the second player, after John Berne, born in Northern Ireland to play first grade rugby league in Australia.
