= Kevin Anderson (cinematographer) =

Australian cinematographer and filmmaker

Kevin Anderson is a cinematographer and filmmaker, working in the Australian film and television industry for over forty years. Anderson's films often include themes of memory, loss and unresolved grief and bereavement.

== Career ==
Anderson completed his first dramatic film, The King of the Two Day Wonder, in 1978. The film was screened at Melbourne's Longford Cinema and at the Sydney Opera House. It was also accepted into the Chicago and Mannheim International Film Festivals of 1978.

Anderson filmed the feature The Still Point in 1985. He was also the Cinematographer on the television documentaries Rainbow Bird and Monster Man, The Buchenwald Ball, Angel, Riot or Revolution, Troubled Minds: The Lithium Revolution, The Fabric of a Dream, Thomson of Arnhem Land, Who’s afraid of Designer Babies? On The Line and Kakadu: Land of the Crocodile.

He wrote, directed and photographed the one hour documentaries In The Realm of the Hackers and Trial by Fire, both of which screened on Australia's ABC television. His script for that film was a finalist in the 2003 NSW Premier's Literary Awards and the film screened at the 2002 Sydney International Film Festival and Perth's REVelation Film Festival for the same year. The film also had a season at Melbourne's Cinema Nova.

During his career Anderson received twenty Australian Cinematographers Society Awards.

Since 2006, Anderson has worked as a lecturer in Film and Digital Media at Deakin University in Melbourne, while continuing his professional filmmaking practice. Completed in 2010, Anderson's one hour documentary Last of the Independents screened throughout Asia on the Australia Network and on ABC 1 in 2012.

Anderson has published articles in Short Film Studies Journal, including "The Way Home: concealment and revelation in The War is Over" in the inaugural issue in 2010, and "Subjective and objective point of view as metaphor in Mitko Panov’s 'With Raised Hands'" in 2012.
