= Jackie Brady =

British artistic gymnast (born 1975)

- Full name: Jacqueline Brady
- Born: 12 December 1975 (age 50)

Gymnastics career
- Discipline: Women's artistic gymnastics
- Country represented: Great Britain; England
- Club: Alderwood
Medal record
Women's artistic gymnastics
Representing England
Commonwealth Games
Gold medal – first place	1994 Victoria	Team event
Silver medal – second place	1994 Victoria	Floor

Jacqueline 'Jackie' Brady (born 12 December 1975) is a female British former artistic gymnast.

Younger sister, Suzanne ‘Suzy’ Brady Kerfoot (born 20 September 1978) is currently ranked as number 3 over 30’s intermediate women’s artistic gymnastics champion (2019).

== Gymnastics career ==
Brady represented England in four events at the 1994 Commonwealth Games in Victoria, British Columbia, Canada. She won a gold medal in the team event and a silver medal on the floor.
