= Zita Lusack =

British artistic gymnast (born 1977)

- Full name: Zita Nancy Lusack
- Born: 4 September 1977 (age 49) Aylesbury, Buckinghamshire

Gymnastics career
- Discipline: Women's artistic gymnastics
- Country represented: Great Britain England
Medal record
Women's artistic gymnastics
Representing England
Commonwealth Games
Gold medal – first place	1994 Victoria	Team event
Silver medal – second place	1994 Victoria	Beam
Bronze medal – third place	1994 Victoria	All-around

Zita Nancy Lusack (born 4 September 1977 in Aylesbury, Buckinghamshire) is a British female former artistic gymnast.

== Gymnastics career ==
Lusack represented England in five events at the 1994 Commonwealth Games in Victoria, British Columbia, Canada. She won a gold medal in the team event, a silver medal on the beam and a bronze medal in the all-around event.
