= The King of the Two Day Wonder =

- Directed by: Kevin Anderson
- Produced by: Walter Dobrowolski; Kevin Anderson
- Cinematography: Kevin Anderson
- Edited by: Kevin Anderson
- Release date: 28 May 1979 (Sydney)
- Running time: 66 mins
- Country: Australia
- Language: English

The King of the Two Day Wonder is a 1979 Australian film. It was directed by Kevin Anderson, and starred Walter Dobrowolski and Sigrid Thornton. Anderson's first dramatic film, it was made with a low budget over a period of four years. It was screened at the 1978 Chicago International Film Festival, (where it was nominated for a Gold Hugo Award.) and the Mannheim International Film Festival in 1978.

== Plot ==
A writer of pulp detective novels has trouble finishing his latest book. The film follows him through a creative dilemma.

== Cast ==
- Walter Dobrowolski as Robert Damien / Blake
- Sigrid Thornton as Christy
- Allen Bickford as Barry
- James Robertson as Assassin
- Maureen O'Loughlin as Ondine
- Peter Sumner as Jim Delaney

== Reception ==
The film was not a commercial success. It has been noted for technical sophistication and creative cinematography, but criticised for being overly stylistic.
