= Elena Domenica Rubeo =

Elena Rubeo OAM
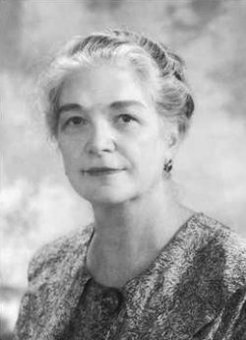
- Born: Elena Domenica Luisa Rubeo; 23 November 1896; Rome, Italy
- Died: 4 June 1979 (aged 82); North Adelaide, South Australia,
- Citizenship: Australian
- Education: Convent of Mercy school
- Occupations: Community worker Businessperson
- Height: 1.78 m (5 ft 10 in)
- Parents: Luigi Rubeo (father); Edvige Cecilia (mother)
- Relatives: 3 brothers

Elena Domenica Luisa Rubeo, OAM, (23 November 1896 – 4 June 1979) was an Australian community worker and businessperson. She has been described as "the introduction to Adelaide" for the many Italians who migrated to South Australia in the 1950s and 60s. She was the first woman in Australia to be an Italian consular.

== Early life ==
Elena Domenica Luisa Rubeo was born on 23 November 1896 in Rome, Italy, the fourth child and only daughter of an Italian working-class family. Her mother, Edvige Cecilia (née Marani), was a homemaker, and her father, Luigi Rubeo, was a printer and compositor. Rubeo had three elder brothers: Gaetano, Alfredo and Ricardo. On 16 October 1908, Rubeo, Ricardo and her parents migrated to Adelaide, South Australia; her two other older brothers had done so before them. Rubeo was educated at the Convent of Mercy school in Angas Street. After relocating to Ruthven Mansions, a luxury mansion in Pulteney Street, in 1912, her family set up Café Rubeo, a restaurant which offered "authentic Roman cuisine" and live music. Rubeo's father was the manager while Gaetano was the restaurant's proprietor. Rubeo became involved in the management of the restaurant in 1914, following the enlisting of her brothers in the Australian Imperial Force. At the same time, she also joined the British (Australian) Red Cross Society. Six years later, in 1920 her parents moved house to 32 Lefevre Terrace, north of Adelaide. It would become Rubeo's permanent abode.

== Death ==
In 1977, Rubeo was awarded the Order of Australia. She died on 4 June 1979 in North Adelaide, South Australia, aged 82 and was cremated with Catholic rites.
