= Apostasy (1979 film) =

1979 film

- Directed by: Zbigniew Friedrich
- Written by: Zbigniew Friedrich
- Produced by: Don McLennan
- Cinematography: Zbigniew Friedrich
- Edited by: Zbigniew Friedrich
- Release date: May 19, 1979
- Running time: 108 minutes
- Country: Australia
- Language: English
- Budget: $50,000

Apostasy, subtitled A Twice Told Tale in Black, Red and White, is a 1979 Australian drama film directed by Zbigniew Friedrich.

== Plot ==
Set in the summer of 1973 two people meet against during social and political turmoil in Australia, including the dismissal of the Whitlam government. As their relationship develops, a gap grows between them and the world around them.

== Cast ==
- Rod McNicol as The Man
- Juliet Bacskai as The Woman
- Phil Motherwell as Madman on the Street
- Alan Money as Old Man in Cafe
- Paul Cox as Photographer
- Ross Skiffington as Magician
- Irene Barberis as Woman at the Table
- Richard Doctors as Concertina Player
- J.J. Jannu as Wood Sculptor

== Reception ==
Steve Wallace in Filmnews said it is "a powerful and brave film that will, unfortunately, only ever be seen by a small number of people in this country." He finishes writing that it "is worthwhile and has a lot to give those willing to take from it." The Sydney Morning Herald's critic Meaghan Morris wrote "Apostasy is an extremely difficult film to come to terms with."

In Australian film, 1978-1992 : a survey of theatrical features Scott Murray noted "Zbigniew Friedrich's Apostasy is typical of many low-budget films of the 1970s. Shot on 16mm, with an essentially unprofessional cast and inexperienced crew, it is very personalised and personal film-making." Looking back at the film in Cinema Papers, Helen Grace calls Motherwell's performance "brilliantly volatile" and writes "For a long while it was hard to watch the film; its angst and romanticism seemed misplaced-too European, perhaps... In such a film, you can glimpse the possibilities of a much edgier, more nervous, richer cinema than the one we now have."
