= Sam Cawthorn =

Samuel Cawthorn
- Born: 15 December 1979 (age 45); Perth, Western Australia, Australia
- Occupation(s): Motivational speaker, author, entrepreneur
- Years active: 2007–
- Spouse: Kate Cawthorn (m. 1999)
- Children: 3
- Website: http://www.samcawthorn.com

Samuel Cawthorn (born 15 December 1979) is an Australian motivational speaker, author and entrepreneur. He was the 2009 Young Australian of the Year for Tasmania.

== Personal life ==
Cawthorn was born in Perth, Western Australia to an Indian mother and a Scottish father; he grew up in a family of 11 children. While he was still a young child his family relocated to rural Tasmania where he grew up on a country farm outside of Hobart. He lives in Balmain, Sydney with his wife Kate and their three children.

== Career ==
=== Early career ===
After completing Matriculation College, Cawthorn began his career by working in sales at Pizza Hut; he then transitioned to a role as a trainer in Northern Tasmania. He later became a regional industry careers adviser and assisted local industry to identify skill shortages and provide solutions for youth entering the workforce.

Cawthorn was also involved in musical theatre productions and established his own music and dance studio.

=== Motivational speaking ===
In October 2006, Cawthorn was involved in a head-on collision with a semi-trailer and needed to be resuscitated. His injuries included amputation of his right arm above the elbow and severe damage to his right leg. Initially distraught by the prospect he may never walk again, during his nine months of rehabilitation he decided to establish a motivational program for young people.

In 2007, Cawthorn established "Be Motivated", a program aimed at providing young people with skills to improve their confidence and self-belief. He has conducted motivational assemblies at schools in Australia and around the world.

=== Young Australian of the Year ===
In November 2008 Sam Cawthorn was awarded the 2009 Young Australian Year award for Tasmania. Before gathering at The Lodge with fellow finalists, Cawthorn accepted a dare from his young daughter to play a practical joke upon Australian Prime Minister, Kevin Rudd. As the two shook hands, Cawthorn detached his artificial hand from its prosthetic arm leaving Rudd holding the artificial hand. Rudd later told the reception he had not recovered from shock and was still "in therapy".
