= Razorback Blockade =

1979 Australian transport industrial campaign

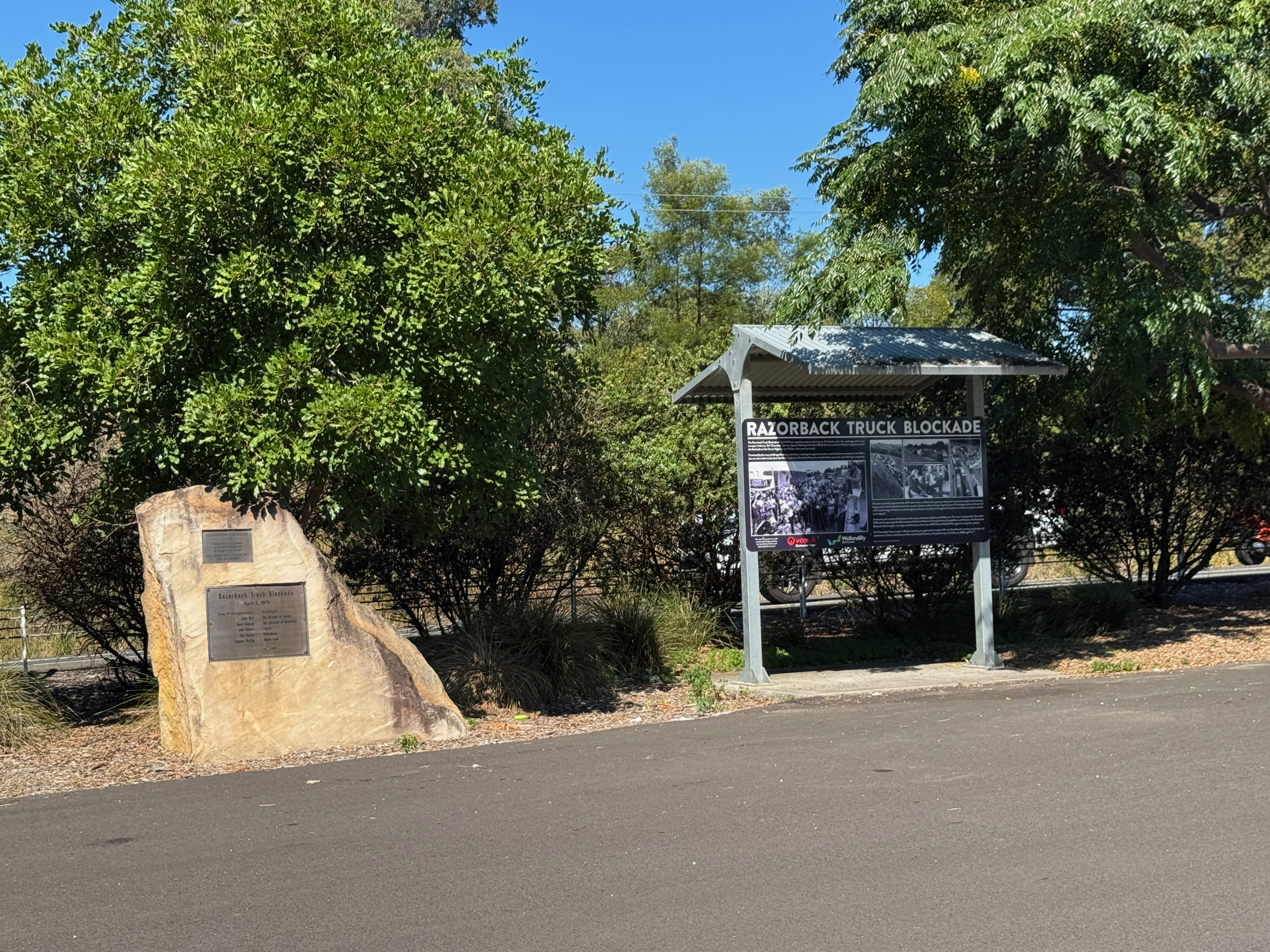
Razorback Blockade Memorial stone and sign

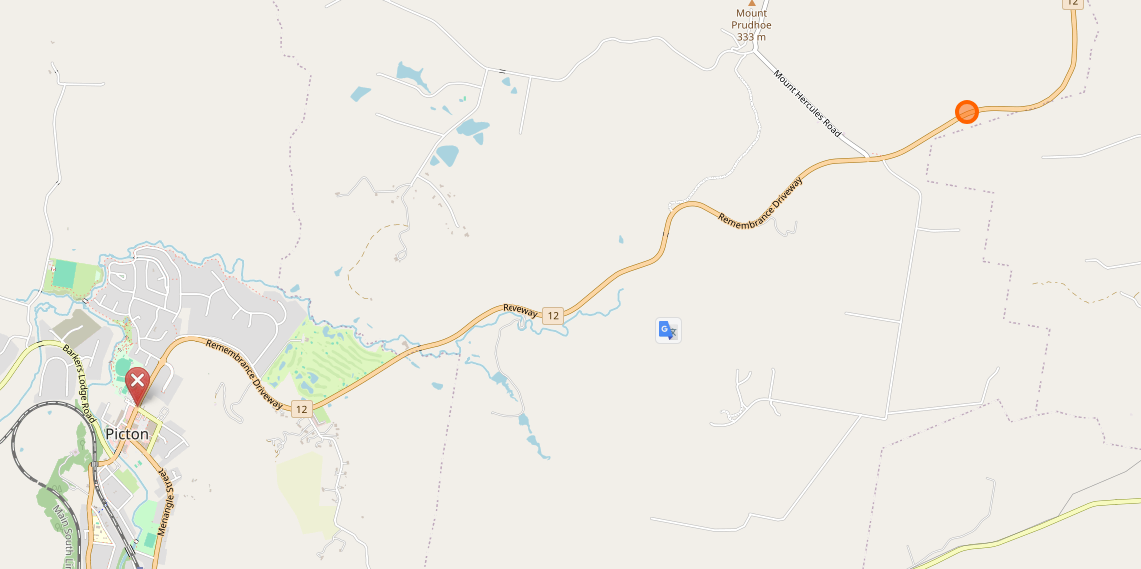
Site of the Razorback Blockade marked with orange circle, on the Hume Highway east of Picton

Razorback Blockade was the name given to an industrial campaign in Australia that saw multiple roads across New South Wales (NSW), Queensland, South Australia and Victoria blocked by trucks in 1979. The blockade was the result of a long-running dispute impacting truck drivers, where they were charged a road tax based on a per-ton, per-mile calculation for trucks. This made road transport more expensive than rail which was owned by state governments, giving the states a commercial advantage.

== Background ==
A road tax was introduced late in 1932, towards the end of the 3rd Lang Government, to protect the New South Wales Government Railways.

In 1952, a petition was presented to the NSW Parliament by independent John Seiffert on behalf of the Long Distance Road Transport Association.

In April 1953, the full bench of the High Court of Australia ruled that a road tax imposed on goods shipped to Queensland by road at 3d per mile per ton was legal. This decision was later referred to the Privy Council, which in 1954 overturned it, based on their reading of Section 92 of the Constitution of Australia. This decision opened opportunities for interstate freight but created a number of issues for intrastate freight and railways.

The road tax for a 12-ton load from Sydney to Melbourne prior to this decision was £105, with £90 going to NSW and £15 going to Victoria. Transport authorities immediately decided to meet in late November to discuss the situation. On 26 November 1954, NSW Transport Minister Ernest Wetherell announced that new legislation would be rushed through Parliament to provide for collecting revenue and to control interstate trucks.

In January 1955, it was revealed that the new legislation was likely to only yield half as much taxes as that prior to the Privy Council's decision. When the new road tax was introduced from 1 February 1955, it was calculated to collect one third of the previous system's taxes.

While the legislative wrangle was taking place, individuals were still being prosecuted for road tax evasion and fined by authorities. In September 1953, Albert James was serving a nine and half month jail sentence, and had been declared bankrupt.

In December 1954, the Firehocks from Ascot, Queensland took out a Supreme Court writ against the Government of Queensland and the Transport Commissioner, alleging that they were charged £6227/9/ in contravention of section 92 of the Constitution.

For a long time, residents of the Australian Capital Territory had been impacted by the NSW Road tax as all goods entering had to come through NSW. In 1964 the issue was raised again with a request to the Menzies for an inquiry into the matter. In March 1965 the road tax was £50/11/11 for a load weighing 21 tons to be carted from Sydney to Canberra.

In 1966 prices rose on Queensland rail freight and subsequent road tax increases to keep rail competitive resulted in woolgrowers from around Winton shipping their produce an extra 800 miles to Sydney as the interstate road tax was considerably less. This caused significant angst and raised concerns that up to half of wool sales in Brisbane would be cancelled due to the volumes being shipped to Sydney. In NSW the Government collected $7.5m in fines from more than 7,000 convictions related to road tax, by 1975 the amount had risen to over $14m from 10,000 convictions.

In 1967 the Privy Council would again hear arguments about the Road Tax, specifically section 92 of the Constitution. Though the action was brought against the state of NSW, all other states (except Tasmania) and the Commonwealth would seek to be parties in support of NSW. In Victoria, a driver was sentenced to six years for non-payment of road taxes in Victoria and NSW. The Long Distance Road Transport Association appealed to the NSW Minister for a different method of punishment for defaulters, while in Victoria the Road Transport Association was negotiating with the state minister for his release. No other industry was being treated similarly.

The Eyre Peninsula Local Government Association held a conference in 1969 with 200 attendees. The delegates asked the SA Treasurer to provide details on the amount of road tax collected on the Eyre Peninsula and how much of that road tax was spent in the area.

== Blockade ==
The truck drivers had been seeking these conditions;

- Equitable freight rates
- Abolition of Road Tax
- No back loading
- Raise weight limits from 36 to 38 tonnes
- Equal pay for all drivers, and the means to enforce it
- No compulsory membership of the TWU
- Uniformed weight and speed limits across Australia
- Introduction of a licensing system to improve resale value and job security
- Exploration of the possibility of Owner Drivers forming their own association
- Stoppage of all current and pending action related to road traffic breaches.
- Assurance no driver would be dismissed as result of the Blockades.
- Moratorium on hire purchase payments and adjustment so that compulsory holidays would not require drivers to be paid during that time.

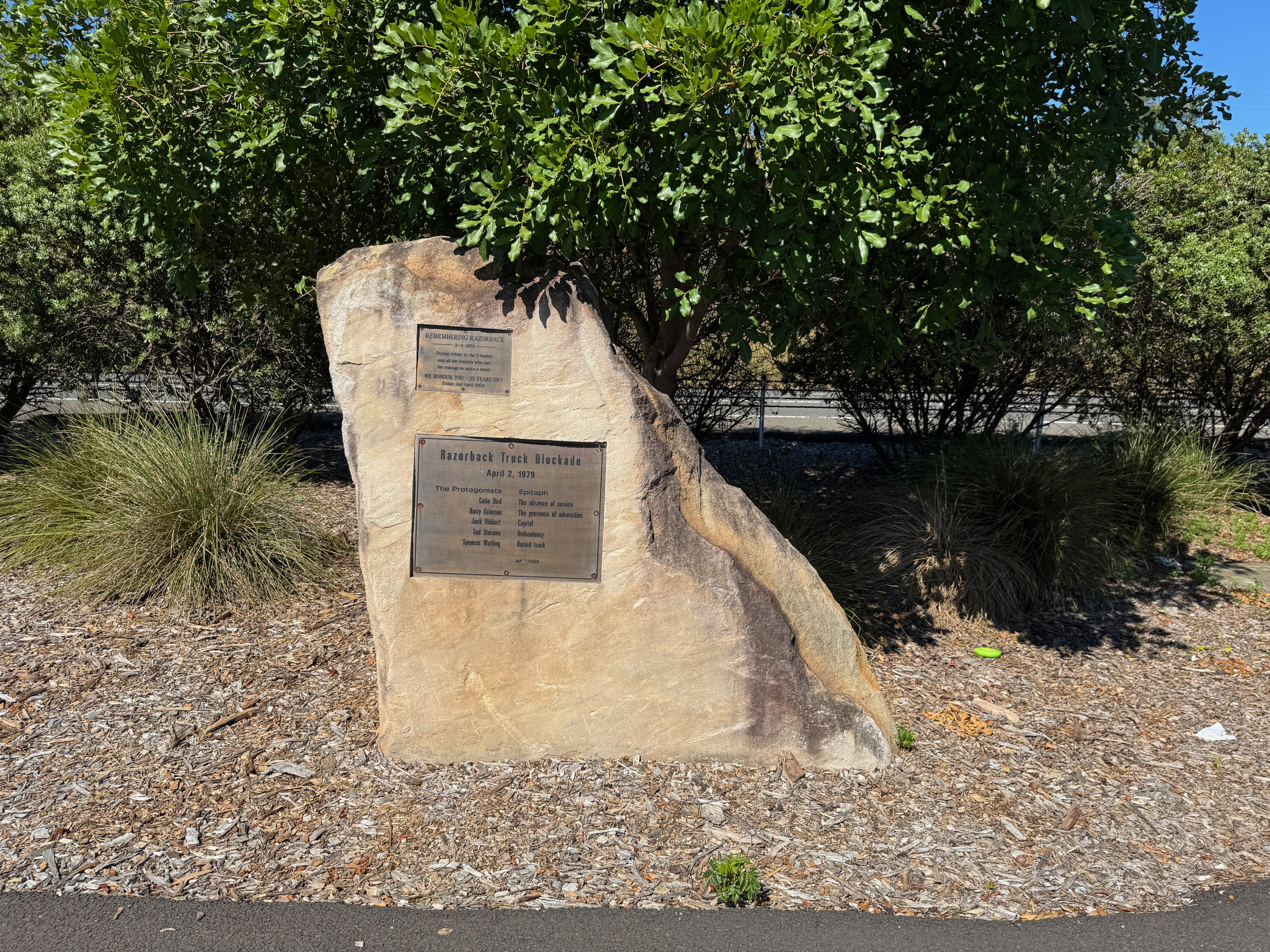
Razorback Blockade Memorial

=== 2 April ===
On 2 April 1979 five drivers, namely Ted Stevens, Barry Grimson, Jack Hibbert, Colin Bird and Spencer Watling, parked their trucks across the Hume Highway where the road peaked as it climbed Razorback Mountain in Razorback, New South Wales. They were later joined by Carle Goodfellow who blocked the nearby Menangle Road that had enabled vehicles to bypass the blockade. As word spread, blockades in support were established across NSW, Queensland, South Australia and Victoria.

=== 3 April ===
Blockades in Sydney, Newcastle, and Wollongong were started, effectively closing those areas to heavy vehicles. The number of vehicles at the Yass blockade was now estimated to be 600.

Four men were arrested at the Razorback Blockade on the Hume Highway. They were arrested for assaulting a police officer by running into him as they parked a truck that was joining the protest. Witnesses said that the police officer jumped onto the bull bar of said truck, while police said the officer was struck by a truck. The police officer was not hurt during the incident.

Both houses of the NSW Parliament sat late into the night to rush through special legislation for dealing with the blockades. The Transport Minister said, "the measures would be tough".

Freight Argosy aircraft were brought in from IPEC's Tasmanian service to cart freight to Sydney. The aircraft can deliver 12 tons of cargo each trip, the equivalent of one semi trailer load. IPEC had three craft available that could do 4 trips per day, TAA and Ansett were operating at maximum freight capacity and were considering adding more freight flights. Victorian rail officials were yet see any increase in demand for rail freight.

=== 4 April ===
A blockade had been established at the Shell Roadhouse in South Yass, but a threat received by Commonwealth Police saw vehicles with dangerous goods being moved to the Yass Showgrounds, the drivers organised teams to keep a 24 hour watch over the trucks. There was also an agreement that trucks carting stock for the Yass sales would be permitted to pass and unload but loaded trucks not be allowed to leave the sale yards. Trucks carrying supplies to hospitals, or goods to the Easter Show were given an exemption to the blockade.

"We've tried everything else, what else could we do"

— Truck Driver; Kym Peterson

A meeting in Sydney between the Minister for Transport Peter Cox, Industrial Relations Minister Pat Hills, and representatives of the driver ended without a resolution. The representatives left saying that no more blockades would be established though existing ones would remain in place.

Four people previously arrested at the Razorback Blockade two from Sydney, two from Melbourne were remanded in custody at the Campbelltown Court to reappear the next day.

Blockades were starting to appear in Queensland at Toowoomba, Ipswich, Aratula, and Coomera as well as at various towns along the NSW border. In South Australia a blockade appeared near to Old Toll Booth in Glen Osmond at the foot of Mount Barker.

=== 5 April ===
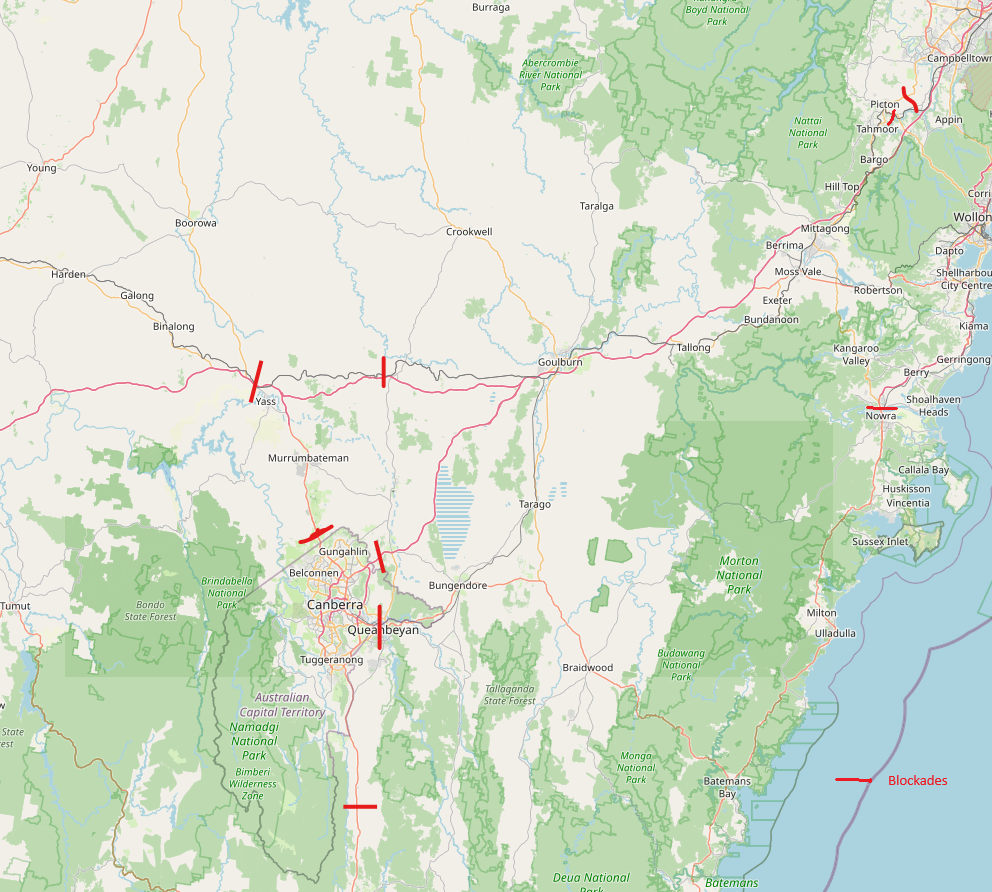
Blockade location between Sydney and Canberra, note that this on a 2026 map, that current path of the Hume highway and related exits were not constructed in 1979. What are shown as minor roads now were the Hume Highway in 1979

Talks to end the blockade collapsed, after which spokesman Ted Stevens said that all rail yards in Sydney and Melbourne will be subject to blockades. Stevens also reaffirmed that private cars and emergency vehicles would continue to pass through blockades unimpeded. Emergency legislation in NSW was passed to give the Government the power to remove trucks from blocking the highways.

Sir Charles Court Premier of Western Australia said that WA been severely impacted by the Commonwealth's decision to further reduce funds for roads meant that the road tax could not be removed. In Victoria Premier Rupert Hamer said it was now their government's policy to abolish road tax and replace it with a tax on fuels.

=== 6 April ===
With an estimated 7,000 trucks at a standstill in NSW, and many hundreds more across the other states, the NSW Government met to consider gazetting the prior day's legislation to enable the forceful removal of trucks blocking highways. In Western Sydney, blockades at Windsor and Prospect were allowing private cars to pass but stopping trucks. Trucks trying to break through a blockade at McGraths Hill resulted in a scuffle with a fire breaking out. In another incident at Mount Victoria, two men were arrested after a police officer was hit by a truck trying to break through a blockade that consisted of about 100 trucks.

Truck drivers at blockades around Canberra had established communities, with a Blockade boss at each site. The boss was calling the shots and attending to the needs at each location. Tasks included: deciding where trucks parked, stopping trucks crossing the line, organising teams to keep watch over the community, and even relieving police on traffic management. They had communal areas with camp fires, cooking equipment, televisions. At Yass they organised a dance, and on another night they organised a BBQ at the local RSL for 50 cents a head.

Senator Don Chipp said that minimum rates should be established for road freight, and suggested that some sort of regulation should be brought in similar to that of the taxi industry. This move would ensure that drivers would have sufficient work and access to capital resources without having to work around the clock just to survive.

=== 7 April ===
There were now blockades in 40 locations spread across the various states involved, while Transport Ministers from each state were meeting in Melbourne. NSW Premier Neville Wran remarked that the continuing blockades amounted to an insurrection. Prime Minister Malcolm Fraser said that the Federal Government would not reimburse states if they end road tax. All routes into Canberra had blockades, though trucks with medical supplies, Australia Post vehicles, and floats heading to the Canberra Trots were being allowed past.

=== 8 April ===
On the blockades, life is relaxing. Truckies sit around sharing stories over quiet drink - though there is no alcohol at the blockades. Some head into town, and others catch up on maintaining their trucks. For a small group, it's their turn volunteering to man the blockade along with two police officers. One police officer is there when a vehicle is stopped and checked to make sure no-one is trying to hide freight. Buses get a bit of extra scrutiny, and under every tarp the load is checked. During their shift, people from the roadhouse regularly take coffee orders and return with them a bit later. For the police it's an interesting situation, they stop the vehicles then the truckies check them. Police are not working with them, yet they are part of the team whenever coffee or food is available, so the police are included. Meanwhile, if a truckie steps out of line, the boss calls them in to deal with the truckie.

=== 9 April ===
It was revealed that Prime Minister Malcolm Fraser had offered Australian Army to support any action to remove the blockades. Meanwhile the Transport Workers Union in Melbourne had said they were not consulted and do not support the blockades. If their members had a police escort they would be able to break through and meet any resistance by taking action.

Mr Wran had met for 2.5hours with representatives of the drivers at Camden, though he cancelled his meeting with reporters afterwards. While the meeting ended with no conclusion it was planned for Mr Wran to meet with representative lawyer, QC David Galbally in Sydney the following day. It was revealed that substantive agreement had been reached.

=== 10 April ===
At 20:30 David Galbally QC, the drivers' legal representative, put forward a settlement proposal to Premier Wran during a meeting that lasted only 30 minutes. Premier Wran rejected the proposal, saying he was not satisfied with the offer. The NSW Government had proclaimed legislation that gave police the power to remove trucks. In what was being described as the biggest peacetime operation 1,500 police officers were being mobilised to move the trucks from the blockades.

A convoy of trucks from TNT were driven from Sydney with police escort. The convoy broke through the Picton blockade and headed for the Yass blockade. At Yass, some 700 trucks were there waiting for them. The police escort left the trucks before they reached the blockade. When the trucks reached it, some of them had their windows smashed. Two market gardeners tried to breach the blockade but both trucks were stopped. One of the market gardeners pointed a .22 caliber rifle at the blockade. Police on the scene intervened and his truck was allowed to pass through. Mr Wran said that truckies were an enemy of the people and that Ted 'Green Dog' Stevens was an anarchist. A plan was drawn up by the Australian Army to help clear the trucks, it was expected that men from an Engineering unit in Sydney were to be assigned.

=== 11 April ===
After a final meeting of the men at the Razorback mountain pass where it all began, Ted Stevens spoke to reporters;

We have won our fight, won the right to arbitration, which is the greatest victory this industry has ever had.

— Ted Stevens

Cans of beer appeared in the hands of truckies in celebration of the win. During the whole time drivers were at blockades, no alcohol had been sighted. The men were jubilant at being able to return to their families and homes. In a final moment of defiance, the horns of the 700 trucks blasted out from Razorback Mountain pass. They started to break up and leave in small groups, some heading towards Sydney and others towards Melbourne. It was expected that the trucks would reach Sydney by peak hour.

== Aftermath ==
As news spread about the resolution, trucks started to move. In Yass, a hat was passed around for the people and police of Yass who had supported the blockade. $1,000 was raised for local charities. A collection was also raised for the truckstops of Yass, special note was given to John Bach of the Shell truckstop who supported with his place being the Yass headquarters of that Blockade. Drivers chipped in and made a gift to Bach in recognition of his help and for freely supplying coffee to all during their stay. Mr Bach said he would not put that money in the till, but rather put it towards buying Lottery tickets, with all winnings to be given to the Union that was to be established from this.

Police Sergeant Jack Donohue was praised for his efforts in working with the drivers, and managing the impact of so many trucks trying to depart. Donohue co-ordinated traffic for 2 days as trucks departed to Sydney, Melbourne, and Canberra; he arranged it so that small groups departed approximately every 20 minutes so as not to cause congestion. Don Hunter the spokesperson at Yass expressed disappointment in some of the reporting about blockade, noting one radio station in Canberra had reported that supplies of headlice treatments and asthma medication had been prevented from reaching Canberra. Hunter pointed out that the drivers lacked the experience of organising such a co-ordinated event, but that they never stopped medical supplies and that a shipment of dialysis treatments from Sydney had passed smoothly through to Canberra, with every blockade on route ensuring that it was not delayed.

In Melbourne, it was announced that an organisation to be known as the Australian Transport Industry Association would be formed, to represent the 10,000 owner drivers, most of whom had joined blockades across the country. Ted Stevens, leader of the Razorback Blockade, revealed that he had been asked to be the President of the Association. It was not all good news for Stevens, as he told reporters that his finance company had been in touch and that they were repossessing his $45,000 truck.

So I lose the truck, but what the hell.

That doesn't mean that I'm going to

give up fighting for this industry.

— Ted Stevens

NSW Premier Mr Wran was very critical of Queensland and Victoria, supported by the Federal Government, who agreed to the truckies' requests which forced NSW to accept the truckies' demands. He was also critical of the all 'nonsense' written by the media about the dispute. NSW Minister for Consumer Affairs Syd Einfeld said that he had taken steps to honour the Government's side of the agreement.

When the NSW Government removed the road tax because of the Razorback Blockade, it was estimated that they were set to lose $20 million per year. On 29 December the NSW Government quietly introduced a registration weight tax of $300, something that had been abolished in 1958, that was expected to net the government $6m per year. The tax was implemented from 1 January 1980, and the timing and quiet nature around the legislation caught the drivers' association off guard, and they were unable to implement any actions to counter it.
