= Appin mine disaster =

1979 mining disaster in Australia

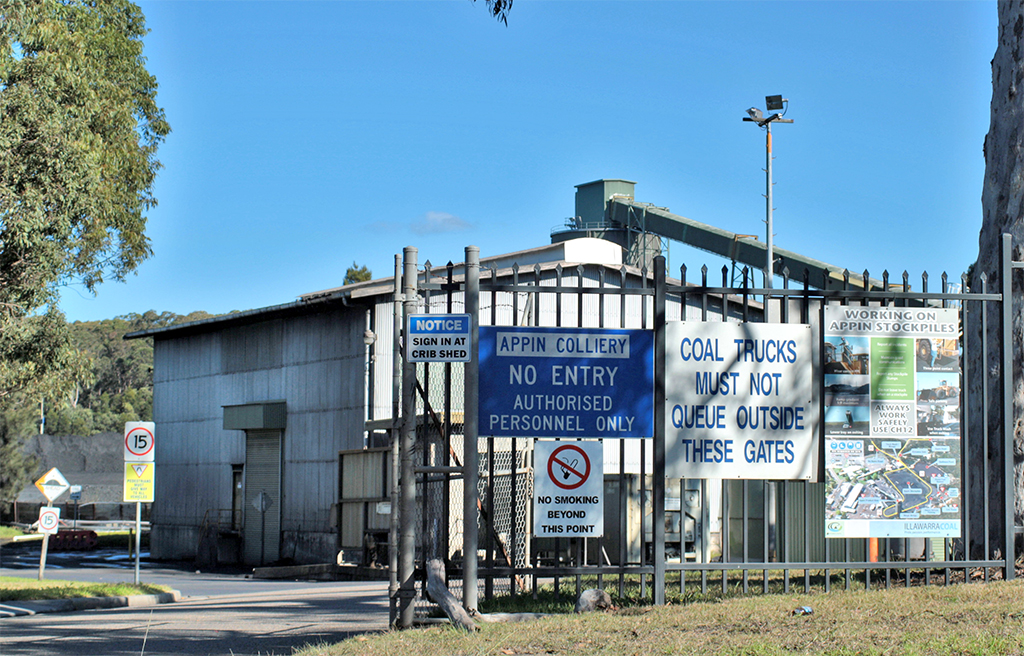
Appin NSW colliery entrance (2010).

The Appin coal mine disaster was a coal mine disaster on the evening of Tuesday, 24 July 1979 at the Appin Colliery, Macarthur Region, New South Wales, Australia, resulting in the death of fourteen people and burns to many of the thirty-one other workers.

== Event ==
Appin Mine (GPS 34°12′38″S 150°47′26″E) is an underground coal mine, operating since 1962 on the Bulli coal seam, and owned by Australian Iron & Steel Collieries. The seam at this depth at Appin had about 15 cubic metres (530 cu ft) of methane gas for every one tonne of coal, and a small capacity gas drainage plant was in place at the time of the event. Work at the time in the K panel (a long single face of coal) included the final stages of changing an existing ventilation system.

A group of forty-five workers were working the 3–11 pm shift and eating in the crib room (meal room), approximately 600 metres (2,000 ft) underground, when a methane build-up was ignited. The crib was in K panel, which was the most remote tunnel of the mine.

Sparks from a fan control box ignited a build-up of flammable and poisonous methane gas, which caused an explosion, that then ripped apart the busiest pit, and caused a series of fires in the mine's damaged ventilation system. Just after 11:00 pm, a huge roar was heard. One survivor reported the men had very little warning; Electrical engineer Jim Hoffman felt the blast 0.5 kilometres (0.3 mi) away.

== Rescue operation ==
The rescue team's members were very distressed by what they saw. Among the twisted metal and clouds of gas were the bodies of ten men sitting where they had been relaxing in the crib room, with another four bodies being found a few metres from the coal face. The miners had no time to escape the danger or save themselves. Thirty-one survivors reached the surface, with some sustaining severe burns. The search for survivors lasted 16 hours.

Eighty-one miners working on the same seam of coal were killed under similar circumstances nearly 100 years earlier.

== Inquiries ==
The New South Wales government ordered a judicial inquiry into the disaster that was held in November 1979, which found the complacency of both the state government and the mine's owners, Australian Iron and Steel Limited, contributed to the explosion.

The man responsible for carrying out safety checks before the explosion had noted the gas build-up and the ventilation problem, stating in the inquiry the information was relayed to the oncoming deputy (who died in the blast). The explosion was confined to the K panel heading due to the fact that the area had been adequately stone-dusted only months before the explosion. (Stone dusting is applying a powder to prevent combusting of flammable/explosive materials.)

The delivery of the Court of Coal Mines Regulation judgement commenced in early May 1980. The finding were considered "a damning indictment of the mine's management and departmental mining inspectors". Presented with contradictory evidence, cover-ups of action, etcetera,

Everyone from the management down was under pressure to keep up production even if that meant breaking safety laws. As the rush to get coal out to fulfil lucrative export orders increases, mining accidents have soared.

The Miners Federation was frustrated about mineworkers not being called to give evidence, such as the previous night not mining due to elevated levels of methane unable to be reduced. They also felt "miners also would have to be educated to change their attitudes to safety", and sceptical that BHP management would improve safety over profit.

The deaths of the fourteen men led to the imposition of stricter safety rules for all mines. Judge Goran made 27 recommendations, towards legislation change, review of administrative methods, and training and equipment. Goran also noted the substandard training within the coalmining industry, and one of Appin's mine managers said "a lot of things [may have been] taken for granted" about what their staff may have understood. It was recommended automatic devices be installed in mines to give continuous reading of gases, that a special officer supervise ventilation, and that the number of mine inspectors be increased.

A second inquiry, a coronial inquiry, differed as to the direct cause of the explosion.

Concerns of co-optation were still evident in 1981 when the government inspectors took no action from the use of welding equipment in a gassy environment, to maintain mine productivity, and focused on poor worker behaviours and none on management behaviours.

Despite attempts at methane capture technology since 2013 at the Appin mine, and receiving a $15M government grant in 2022, methane is still leaking from the mines including the adjacent West Cliff mine.

== Memorials ==
The Appin Mine Memorial Garden, Sportsground Parade, Appin was opened on 24 July 1980, together with fourteen gum trees planted in two rows.

A new memorial sculpture was unveiled 24 July 2020, consisting of 14 steel arches each representing one of the miners who died, gently curve upwards and inwards to form a tunnel, reminiscent of a longwall mine tunnel. The arches were made from local BlueScope Steel and the sculpture's three hardwood seating areas were made by members of the Appin Men's Shed. The sculpture was commissioned by South32 a year ago on the 40th anniversary from sculptor Paul Johnson and designer Gail Mason. The sculpture is in the Appin Mine Memorial Garden.

The deceased members were Alwyn Brewin (37), Francis Garrity (37), Ian Giffard (36), Geoffrey Johnson (35), Jurgen Lauterbach (30), Alexander Lawson (35), James Oldcorn (58), Peter Peck (36), Robert Rawcliffe (45), Roy Rawlings (31), Karl Staats (48), John Stonham (41), Roy Williams (27), Gary Woods (30).

The memorial garden also remembers the South Bulli Colliery tragedy of three mineworkers who were asphyxiated by gas on 24 July 1991. A separate plaque is for another person killed on 3 March 1985.

== See also ==
- Mount Kembla 1902 mining explosion
