= Salli Wills =

Australian gymnast

Personal information
- Nationality: Australian

Sport
- Sport: Gymnastics
Medal record
Commonwealth Games
Gold medal – first place	1994 Victoria	Beam
Bronze medal – third place	1994 Victoria	Team

Salli Wills is an Australian artistic gymnast.

She competed at the 1994 Commonwealth Games where she won a gold medal in the beam event and a bronze medal in the team event.

Her training was put on hold in May 1995 when she broke her foot.
