= Lisa Simes =

Canadian artistic gymnast

Personal information
- Born: 22 October 1976 (age 49) Regina, Saskatchewan, Canada

Sport
- Sport: Gymnastics
Medal record
Commonwealth Games
Silver medal – second place	1994 Victoria	Team
Bronze medal – third place	1994 Victoria	Vault
Bronze medal – third place	1994 Victoria	Floor

Lisa Simes (born 22 October 1976) is a Canadian artistic gymnast.

== Life and career ==
Simes is from Regina, Saskatchewan, Canada and was born on 22 October 1976. She married American triathlete Andy Potts in January 2004 They have a son called Boston and a daughter called Sloane.

She began competing in gymnastics with Queen City Gymnastics Club and won the regional gymnastics championships in Saskatchewan between 1988 and 1992 and in Ontario in 1994 and 1995. In 1991 she won the Western Canadian championship and in 1992 the Canadian Open champion. She was on the Canadian National Gymnastics Team between 1992 and 1995.

She competed at the 1994 Commonwealth Games where she won a silver medal in the team event, bronze medals in the vault and floor events and came 4th in the individual all-around event.

She competed for the University of Michigan at junior and senior level between 1995 and 1999 and was a trapeze artist in the Cirque du Soleil show O. She was inducted into the Saskatchewan Sports Hall of Fame in June 2002.

She was diagnosed with thyroid cancer in 2004 and had a lump removed in November of that year. In January 2005 she had surgery to remove the thyroid, five lymph nodes and two parathyroid glands. She had ablation therapy in early 2005.
