= Ruth Moniz =

Australian gymnast

Personal information
- Nationality: Australian
- Born: 20 September 1977 (age 48) Adelaide, Australia

Sport
- Sport: Gymnastics
Medal record
Representing Australia
Commonwealth Games
| Bronze medal – third place | 1994 Victoria | Beam |
| Bronze medal – third place | 1994 Victoria | Team |

Ruth Moniz (born 20 September 1977) is an Australian gymnast. She competed at the 1996 Summer Olympics, where she finished 35th in the individual all around.
