= Australia at the 2002 Commonwealth Games =

- CG code: AUS
- CGA: Australian Commonwealth Games Association
- Website: commonwealthgames.org.au

in Manchester, England
- Competitors: 355
- Flag bearers: Opening: Damian Brown; Closing:Ian Thorpe
- Officials: 151
- Medals Ranked 1st: Gold 82 Silver 62 Bronze 63 Total 207

Commonwealth Games appearances (overview)
- 1930; 1934; 1938; 1950; 1954; 1958; 1962; 1966; 1970; 1974; 1978; 1982; 1986; 1990; 1994; 1998; 2002; 2006; 2010; 2014; 2018; 2022; 2026; 2030

Australia was represented at the 2002 Commonwealth Games by a team selected by the Australian Commonwealth Games Association (ACGA) and abbreviated AUS.

Australia officially became a member of the Commonwealth of Nations in 1931 under the Statute of Westminster having become independent of the UK in 1901.

Australia is one of only six countries to have competed in all of the Commonwealth Games held since 1930, although they did attend the 1911 Inter-Empire Championships as part of an Australasian team. This impressive international record extends to its participation in every Olympic Games in the modern era.

At the first Games in 1930 Australia won only 8 medals against England's 61. However, by the first Games of the 21st century held in the city of Manchester, Australia's medal tally had moved to 207, ahead of any other country including England's 165.

== Medals ==
Medal	Name	Sport	Event
Gold	Nathan Deakes	Athletics	Men's 20 km walk
Gold	Nathan Deakes	Athletics	Men's 50 km walk
Gold	Justin Anlezark	Athletics	Men's shot put
Gold	Kerryn McCann	Athletics	Women's marathon
Gold	Jana Pittman	Athletics	Women's 400 m hurdles
Gold	Jane Saville	Athletics	Women's 20 km walk
Gold	Lauren Hewitt; Cathy Freeman; Tamsyn Lewis; Jana Pittman; Kylie Wheeler (heat)	Athletics	Women's 4 x 400 m relay
Gold	Tatiana Grigorieva	Athletics	Women's pole vault
Gold	Jane Jamieson	Athletics	Women's heptathlon
Gold	Justin Kane	Boxing	Bantamweight
Gold	Daniel Geale	Boxing	Welterweight
Gold	Paul Miller	Boxing	Middleweight
Gold	Ryan Bayley	Cycling	Men's sprint
Gold	Jobie Dajka; Sean Eadie; Ryan Bayley	Cycling	Men's team sprint
Gold	Brad McGee	Cycling	Men's individual pursuit
Gold	Graeme Brown; Luke Roberts; Mark Renshaw; Peter Dawson; Stephen Wooldridge	Cycling	Men's team pursuit
Gold	Graeme Brown	Cycling	Men's scratch race
Gold	Cadel Evans	Cycling	Men's road time trial
Gold	Stuart O'Grady	Cycling	Men's road race
Gold	Kerrie Meares	Cycling	Women's sprint
Gold	Kerrie Meares	Cycling	Women's 500 m time trial
Gold	Katherine Bates	Cycling	Women's points race
Gold	Irina Lashko	Diving	Women's 1 m springboard
Gold	Irina Lashko	Diving	Women's 3 m springboard
Gold	Loudy Tourky	Diving	Women's 10 m platform
Gold	Maria Pekli	Judo	Women's 57- kg
Gold	Philippe Rizzo	Gymnastics	Men's high bar
Gold	Philippe Rizzo	Gymnastics	Men's parallel bars
Gold	Philippe Rizzo	Gymnastics	Men's pommel horse
Gold	Sarah Lauren	Gymnastics	Women's floor
Gold	Allana Slater	Gymnastics	Women's vault
Gold	Alexandra Croak; Allana Slater; Jacqui Dunn; Sarah Lauren; Stephanie Moorhouse	Gymnastics	Women's team
Gold	Australia men's national field hockey team: Dean Butler Liam De Young Jamie Dwyer Troy Elder Paul Gaudoin Bevan George Mark Hickman Aaron Hopkins Stephen Lambert Brent Livermore Michael McCann Matthew Smith Ben Taylor Craig Victory Scott Webster Matthew Wells	Hockey	Men's team
Gold	Tom Hill	Judo	Men's 73- kg
Gold	Australia national netball team: Alexandra Hodge Alison Broadbent Catherine Cox Liz Ellis Eloise Southby Jacqui Delaney Janine Ilitch Kathryn Harby-Williams Nicole Richardson Peta Squire Rebecca Sanders Sharelle McMahon	Netball	Women's team
Gold	Michael Diamond	Shooting	Men's trap
Gold	Michael Diamond; Adam Vella	Shooting	Men's trap pairs
Gold	Timothy Lowndes; Samuel Wieland	Shooting	Men's 50 m rifle 3 positions pairs
Gold	Timothy Lowndes	Shooting	Men's 50 m rifle prone
Gold	Lalita Yauhleuskaya	Shooting	Women's 10 m air pistol
Gold	Lalita Yauhleuskaya	Shooting	Women's 25 m air pistol
Gold	Lalita Yauhleuskaya; Linda Ryan	Shooting	Women's 25 m air pistol pairs
Gold	Nessa Jenkins; Diane Reeves	Shooting	Women's trap pairs
Gold	Lauryn Ogilvie	Shooting	Women's skeet
Gold	Lauryn Ogilvie; Natalia Rahman	Shooting	Women's skeet pairs
Gold	Kim Frazer	Shooting	Women's 50 m rifle prone
Gold	Sarah Fitz-Gerald	Squash	Women's singles
Gold	Ben Austin	Swimming	Men's 50 m freestyle EAD
Gold	Ben Austin	Swimming	Men's 100 m freestyle EAD
Gold	Ian Thorpe	Swimming	Men's 100 m freestyle
Gold	Ian Thorpe	Swimming	Men's 200 m freestyle
Gold	Ian Thorpe	Swimming	Men's 400 m freestyle
Gold	Grant Hackett	Swimming	Men's 1500 m freestyle
Gold	Matt Welsh	Swimming	Men's 100 m backstroke
Gold	Matt Welsh	Swimming	Men's 200 m backstroke
Gold	Jim Piper	Swimming	Men's 200 m breaststroke
Gold	Geoff Huegill	Swimming	Men's 50 m butterfly
Gold	Geoff Huegill	Swimming	Men's 100 m butterfly
Gold	Justin Norris	Swimming	Men's 200 m butterfly
Gold	Justin Norris	Swimming	Men's 400 m individual medley
Gold	Justin Norris	Swimming	Men's 200 m individual medley
Gold	Ashley Callus; Todd Pearson; Grant Hackett; Ian Thorpe; Leon Dunne (heat); Adam Pine (heat)	Swimming	Men's 4 x 100 m freestyle relay
Gold	Grant Hackett; Leon Dunne; Jason Cram; Ian Thorpe	Swimming	Men's 4 x 200 m freestyle relay
Gold	Matt Welsh; Jim Piper; Geoff Huegill; Ian Thorpe	Swimming	Men's 4 x 100 m medley relay
Gold	Jodie Henry	Swimming	Women's 100 m freestyle
Gold	Dyana Calub	Swimming	Women's 50 m backstroke
Gold	Leisel Jones	Swimming	Women's 100 m breaststroke
Gold	Leisel Jones	Swimming	Women's 200 m breaststroke
Gold	Petria Thomas	Swimming	Women's 50 m butterfly
Gold	Petria Thomas	Swimming	Women's 100 m butterfly
Gold	Petria Thomas	Swimming	Women's 200 m butterfly
Gold	Jennifer Reilly	Swimming	Women's 400 m individual medley
Gold	Alice Mills; Jodie Henry; Petria Thomas; Sarah Ryan	Swimming	Women's 4 x 100 m freestyle relay
Gold	Dyana Calub; Leisel Jones; Petria Thomas; Jodie Henry	Swimming	Women's 4 x 100 m medley relay
Gold	Yurik Sarkisian	Weightlifting	Men's 62 kg snatch
Gold	Yurik Sarkisian	Weightlifting	Men's 62 kg clean & jerk
Gold	Yurik Sarkisian	Weightlifting	Men's 62 kg combined
Gold	Damian Brown	Weightlifting	Men's 77 kg snatch
Gold	Aleksander Karapetyan	Weightlifting	Men's 94 kg snatch
Gold	Aleksander Karapetyan	Weightlifting	Men's 94 kg clean & jerk
Gold	Aleksander Karapetyan	Weightlifting	Men's 94 kg combined
Gold	Caroline Pileggi	Weightlifting	Women's 77+ kg snatch
Silver	Luke Adams	Athletics	Men's 20 km walk
Silver	Paul Burgess	Athletics	Men's pole vault
Silver	Matthew McEwen	Athletics	Men's decathlon
Silver	Krishna Stanton	Athletics	Women's marathon
Silver	Kym Howe	Athletics	Women's pole vault
Silver	Cecilia McIntosh	Athletics	Women's javelin throw
Silver	Bronwyn Eagles	Athletics	Women's hammer throw
Silver	Kylie Wheeler	Athletics	Women's heptathlon
Silver	Louise Sauvage	Athletics	Women's 800 m wheelchair
Silver	Karen Murphy	Bowls	Women's singles
Silver	Sean Eadie	Cycling	Men's sprint
Silver	Mark Renshaw	Cycling	Men's points race
Silver	Michael Rogers	Cycling	Men's road time trial
Silver	Cadel Evans	Cycling	Men's road race
Silver	Katherine Bates	Cycling	Women's individual pursuit
Silver	Rochelle Gilmore	Cycling	Women's points race
Silver	Anna Millward	Cycling	Women's road time trial
Silver	Damian Istria	Gymnastics	Men's high bar
Silver	Philippe Rizzo	Gymnastics	Men's all around
Silver	Allana Slater	Gymnastics	Women's beam
Silver	Allana Slater	Gymnastics	Women's beam
Silver	Alex Croak	Gymnastics	Women's vault
Silver	Bruce Quick	Shooting	Men's 25 m center-fire pistol
Silver	Bruce Quick	Shooting	Men's 25 m rapid fire pistol
Silver	Bruce Quick; David Moore	Shooting	Men's 25 m center-fire pistol pairs
Silver	Bruce Quick; David Moore	Shooting	Men's 50 m free pistol pairs
Silver	Adam Vella	Shooting	Men's trap
Silver	Russell Mark	Shooting	Men's double trap
Silver	Russell Mark; Michael Diamond	Shooting	Men's double trap pairs
Silver	George Barton; David Cunningham	Shooting	Men's skeet pairs
Silver	Timothy Lowndes	Shooting	Men's 50 m rifle 3 positions
Silver	Natalia Rahman	Shooting	Women's skeet
Silver	Susan McCready; Susannah Smith	Shooting	Women's 50 m rifle 3 positions
Silver	Linda Ryan	Shooting	Women's 25 m pistol
Silver	Phil Adams; Bruce Quick	Shooting	Open 25 m standard pistol pairs
Silver	Stewart Boswell; Anthony Ricketts	Squash	Men's doubles
Silver	Brett Hawke	Swimming	Men's 50 m freestyle
Silver	Ashley Callus	Swimming	Men's 100 m freestyle
Silver	Grant Hackett	Swimming	Men's 200 m freestyle
Silver	Grant Hackett	Swimming	Men's 400 m freestyle
Silver	Ian Thorpe	Swimming	Men's 100 m backstroke
Silver	Jodie Henry	Swimming	Women's 50 m freestyle
Silver	Elka Graham	Swimming	Women's 400 m freestyle
Silver	Amanda Pascoe	Swimming	Women's 800 m freestyle
Silver	Dyana Calub	Swimming	Women's 100 m backstroke
Silver	Brooke Hanson	Swimming	Women's 100 m breaststroke
Silver	Nicole Irving	Swimming	Women's 50 m butterfly
Silver	Jennifer Reilly	Swimming	Women's 200 m individual medley
Silver	Elka Graham; Giaan Rooney; Rebecca Creedy; Petria Thomas	Swimming	Women's 4 x 200 m freestyle relay
Silver	Brett Clarke; Lay Jian Fang	Table tennis	Mixed doubles
Silver	Tammy Gough; Cho Yuen-Wern; Lay Jian Fang; Peri Campbell-Innes; Miao Miao	Table tennis	Women's team
Silver	Miles Stewart	Triathlon	Men's race
Silver	Corran Hocking	Weightlifting	Men's 105+ kg clean & jerk
Silver	Richard Nicholson	Weightlifting	Men's bench press EAD
Silver	Natasha Barker	Weightlifting	Women's 53 kg snatch
Silver	Natasha Barker	Weightlifting	Women's 53 kg clean & jerk
Silver	Natasha Barker	Weightlifting	Women's 53 kg combined
Silver	Deborah Lovely	Weightlifting	Women's 75 kg snatch
Silver	Deborah Lovely	Weightlifting	Women's 75 kg clean & jerk
Silver	Deborah Lovely	Weightlifting	Women's 75 kg combined
Silver	Caroline Pileggi	Weightlifting	Women's 75+ kg clean & jerk
Silver	Caroline Pileggi	Weightlifting	Women's 75+ kg combined
Bronze	Kris McCarthy	Athletics	Men's 800 m
Bronze	Youcef Abdi	Athletics	Men's 1500 m
Bronze	Tim Williams; Paul di Bella; David Baxter; Patrick Johnson	Athletics	Men's 4 x 100 m relay
Bronze	Andrew Letherby	Athletics	Men's marathon
Bronze	Lauren Hewitt	Athletics	Women's 200 metres
Bronze	Susie Power	Athletics	Women's 10000 metres
Bronze	Jackie Gallagher	Athletics	Women's marathon
Bronze	Bridgid Isworth	Athletics	Women's pole vault
Bronze	Karyne Di Marco	Athletics	Women's hammer throw
Bronze	Eliza Stankovic	Athletics	Women's 800 m wheelchair
Bronze	Phillip Kearins; Neville Read; James Reynolds	Bowls	Men's para triples
Bronze	Ben McEachran	Boxing	Light heavyweight
Bronze	Jobie Dajka	Cycling	Men's sprint
Bronze	Nathan O'Neill	Cycling	Men's road time trial
Bronze	Baden Cooke	Cycling	Men's road race
Bronze	Anna Meares	Cycling	Women's sprint
Bronze	Alison Wright	Cycling	Women's individual pursuit
Bronze	Mary Grigson	Cycling	Women's mountain bike
Bronze	Steven Barnett	Diving	Men's 1 m springboard
Bronze	Robert Newbery	Diving	Men's 3 m springboard
Bronze	Philippe Rizzo	Gymnastics	Men's floor
Bronze	Damian Istria; Dane Smith; Justin Kok Loong Ng; Pavel Mamine; Philippe Rizzo	Gymnastics	Men's team
Bronze	Jacqui Dunn	Gymnastics	Women's beam
Bronze	Allana Slater	Gymnastics	Women's all around
Bronze	Australia women's national field hockey team: Angie Skirving Bianca Langham-Pritchard Bianca Netzler Brooke Morrison Carmel Bakurski Joanne Banning Julie Towers Karen Smith Katrina Powell Louise Dobson Melanie Twitt Ngaire Smith Nikki Hudson Nina Bonner Rachel Imison Tammy Cole	Hockey	Women's team
Bronze	Angela Raguz	Judo	Women's 52- kg
Bronze	Martin Kelly	Judo	Men's 100- kg
Bronze	Daniel Rusitovic	Judo	Men's 100+ kg
Bronze	Timothy Lowndes	Shooting	Men's 10 m air rifle
Bronze	Bruce Favell; Bruce Quick	Shooting	Men's 25 m rapid fire pistol pairs
Bronze	Samuel Wieland	Shooting	Men's 50 m rifle 3 positions
Bronze	Annemarie Forder	Shooting	Women's 10 m air pistol
Bronze	Annemarie Forder; Lalita Yauhleuskaya	Shooting	Women's 10 m air pistol pairs
Bronze	Suzanne Balogh; Suzie Trindall	Shooting	Women's trap pairs
Bronze	Stewart Boswell	Squash	Men's singles
Bronze	David Palmer	Squash	Men's singles
Bronze	Rachael Grinham	Squash	Women's singles
Bronze	David Palmer; Paul Price	Squash	Men's doubles
Bronze	Rachael Grinham; Natalie Grinham	Squash	Women's doubles
Bronze	Joe Kneipp; Robyn Cooper	Squash	Mixed doubles
Bronze	Craig Stevens	Swimming	Men's 1500 m freestyle
Bronze	Adam Pine	Swimming	Men's 100 m butterfly
Bronze	Elka Graham	Swimming	Women's 200 m freestyle
Bronze	Petria Thomas	Swimming	Women's 200 m freestyle
Bronze	Giaan Rooney	Swimming	Women's 100 m backstroke
Bronze	Tarnee White	Swimming	Women's 50 m breaststroke
Bronze	Kelli Waite	Swimming	Women's 200 m breaststroke
Bronze	Jessica Abbott	Swimming	Women's 400 m individual medley
Bronze	Joy Boyd	Table tennis	Women's EAD Singles – Open Wheelchair
Bronze	Miao Miao; Lay Jian Fang	Table tennis	Women's doubles
Bronze	Nicole Hackett	Triathlon	Women's race
Bronze	Naomi Young	Synchronised swimming	Women's solo
Bronze	Naomi Young; Ashleigh Rudder	Synchronised swimming	Women's duet
Bronze	Reinold Ozoline	Wrestling	Men's Freestyle 74 kg
Bronze	Mushtaq Rasem Abdullah	Wrestling	Men's Freestyle 120 kg
Bronze	Craig Blythman	Weightlifting	Men's 77 kg snatch
Bronze	Chris Rae	Weightlifting	Men's 105+ kg snatch
Bronze	Corran Hocking	Weightlifting	Men's 105+ kg combined
Bronze	Seen Lee	Weightlifting	Women's 53 kg snatch
Bronze	Seen Lee	Weightlifting	Women's 53 kg clean & jerk
Bronze	Seen Lee	Weightlifting	Women's 53 kg combined
Bronze	Saree Williams	Weightlifting	Women's 75 kg snatch
Bronze	Saree Williams	Weightlifting	Women's 75 kg combined

Medals by sport
Sport	1st place, gold medalist(s)	2nd place, silver medalist(s)	3rd place, bronze medalist(s)	
Swimming	27	13	8	48
Shooting	11	13	6	30
Cycling	10	7	6	23
Athletics	9	9	10	28
Weightlifting	8	10	8	26
Gymnastics	6	5	4	15
Diving	3	0	2	5
Boxing	3	0	1	4
Judo	2	0	3	5
Squash	1	1	6	8
Hockey	1	0	1	2
Netball	1	0	0	1
Table Tennis	0	2	2	4
Lawn Bowls	0	1	1	2
Triathlon	0	1	1	2
Synchronised swimming	0	0	2	2
Wrestling	0	0	2	2
Total	82	62	63	207

== Results by event ==
=== Athletics ===
Women's 100 Metres

- Lauren Hewitt – 5th in Semi Final 2, 11.45 s

Women's 100 Metres Hurdles

- Jacquie Munro – 7th in Final, 13.31 s
- Fiona Cullen – 6th in Heat 1, 13.45 s

Women's 200 Metres

- Lauren Hewitt – Bronze, 22.69 s
- Sharon Cripps – 7th in Final 23.04 s

Men's 400 Metres

- Clinton Hill – 8th in Final, 46.00 s

Women's 400 Metres Hurdles

- Jana Pittman – Gold, 54.40 s
- Sonia Brito – 5th in Final, 57.79 s

Men's 800 Metres

- Kris McCarthy – Bronze, 1 min 46.79 s

Women's 800 Metres

- Tamsyn Lewis – 5th in Final, 1 min 59.73 s

Men's 1500 Metres

- Youcef Abdi – Bronze, 3 min 37.77 s

Women's 1500 Metres

- Sarah Jamieson – 5th in Final, 4 min 9.38 s
- Benita Johnson – 7th in Heat 1, 4 min 24.43 s

Men's 5 000 Metres

- Craig Mottram – 6th, 13 min 25.21 s
- Michael Power – 8th, 13 min 34.04 s

Women's 5 000 Metres

- Benita Johnson – 6th, 15 min 26.55 s
- Anna Thompson – 9th, 15 min 43.92 s
- Haley McGregor – 11th, 15 min 47.10 s

Men's 10 000 Metres

- Sisay Bezabeh – 9th, 28 min 37.12 s
- Dean Cavuoto – 16th, 29 min 18.38 s
- Brett Cartwright – 18th, 29 min 21.29 s

Women's 10 000 Metres

- Susie Power – Bronze, 31 min 32.20 s
- Kerryn McCann – Did Not Start

Men's Marathon

- Andrew Letherby – Bronze, 2 hours 13 min 23 s
- Lee Troop – 7th, 2 hours 16 min 44 s
- Shaun Creighton – 9th, 2 hours 18 min 19 s

Women's Marathon

- Kerryn McCann – Gold, 2 hours 30 mins5 s
- Krishna Stanton – Silver, 2 hours 34 min 52 s
- Jackie Gallagher – Bronze, 2 hours 36 min 37 s

Men's 4 x 100 Metres Relay

- Australia – Bronze, 38.87 s
  - David Baxter
  - Patrick Johnson
  - Paul Di Bella
  - Tim Williams

Women's 4 x 100 Metres Relay

- Australia – 4th in Final, 43.72 s
  - Jodi Lambert
  - Lauren Hewitt
  - Melanie Kleeberg
  - Sharon Cripps

Men's 4 x 400 Metres Relay

- Australia – 5th in Final, 3 min 2.22 s
  - Clinton Hill
  - Kris McCarthy
  - Patrick "Pat" Dwyer
  - Paul Pearce
  - Tim Williams

Women's 4 x 400 Metres Relay

- Australia – Gold, 3 min 25.63 s
  - Cathy Freeman
  - Jana Pittman
  - Kylie Wheeler
  - Lauren Hewitt
  - Tamsyn Lewis

Men's 20 Kilometre Walk

- Nathan Deakes – Gold, 1 hour 25 min 35 s
- Luke Adams – Silver, 1 hour 26 min 3 s

Women's 20 Kilometre Walk

- Jane Kara Saville – Gold, 1 hour 36 min 34 s
- Natalie Saville– 4th, 1 hour 42 min 38 s
- Simone Wolowiec – 5th, 1 hour 43 min 10 s

Men's 50 Kilometre Walk

- Nathan Deakes – Gold, 3 hours 52 min 40 s
- Duane Cousins – 4th, 4 hours 9 min 59 s
- Liam Murphy – Disqualified

Men's Shot Put

- Justin Anlezark – Gold, 20.91 metres
- Clay Cross – 6th, 18.10 metres

Men's Javelin

- William Hamlyn-Harris – 4th, 77.31 metres
- Andrew Currey – 5th, 76.98 metres

Women's Javelin

- Cecillia McIntosh – Silver, 57.42 metres

Men's Hammer Throw

- Stuart Rendell – 4th, 67.51 metres

Women's Hammer Throw

- Bronwyn Eagles – Silver, 65.24 metres
- Karyne di Marco – Bronze, 63.40 metres

Men's Long Jump

- Tim Parravicini – 9th, 7.60 metres

Men's High Jump

- Nick Moroney – 4th, 2.20 metres

Men's Triple Jump

- Andrew Murphy – 7th, 16.37 metres

Men's Pole Vault

- Paul Burgess – Silver, 5.70 metres
- Viktor Chistiakov – Equal 4th, 5.50 metres
- Dmitri Markov – Equal 4th, 5.50 metres

Women's Pole Vault

- Tatiana Grigorieva – Gold, 4.35 metres
- Kym Howe – Silver, 4.15 metres
- Bridgid Isworth – Equal Bronze, 4.10 metres

Women's Heptathlon

- Jane Jamieson – Gold, 6 059 points
- Kylie Wheeler – Silver, 5 962 points

Men's Decathlon

- Matthew McEwen – Silver, 7 685 points

Women's 800 Metres Wheelchair

- Louise Sauvage – Silver, 1 min 53.30 s
- Eliza Jane Stankovic – Bronze, 1 min 54.20 s

Men's 100 Metres EAD

- Paul Harpur – 3rd in Semi Final 1, 12.57 s

=== Boxing ===
Men's Bantamweight Division (54 kg)

- Justin Kane – Gold

Men's Welterweight Division (67 kg)

- Daniel Geale – Gold

Men's Middleweight Division (75 kg)

- Paul Miller – Gold

Men's Light Heavyweight Division (81 kg)

- Ben McEachran – Equal Bronze

=== Cycling ===
Men's 20 km Scratch Race

- Graeme Brown – Gold, 24 min 14.660 s

Women's 25 km Points Race

- Katherine Bates – Gold, 37 points
- Rochelle Gilmore – Silver, 23 points

Women's 3 000 Metres Individual Pursuit

- Katherine Bates – Silver, 3 min 34.193 s
- Alison Wright – Bronze, 3 min 40.409 s

Men's 30K Points Race

- Mark Renshaw – Silver, 27 points

Men's 4 000 Metres Individual Pursuit

- Bradley "Brad" McGee – Gold, 4 min 16.358 s

Men's 4 000 Metres Team Pursuit

- Australia – Gold, 3 min 59.583 s
  - Graeme Brown
  - Luke Roberts
  - Mark Renshaw
  - Peter Dawson
  - Stephen Wooldridge

Women's 500 Metres Time Trial

- Kerrie Meares – Gold, 35.084 s

Women's Cross Country (Mountain Bike)

- Mary Grigson – Bronze, 1 hour 32 min 49 s

Men's Road Race (187.2 km)

- Stuart O'Grady – Gold, 4 hours 43 min 17 s
- Cadel Evans – Silver, 4 hours 45 min 25 s
- Baden Cooke – Bronze, 4 hours 45 min 45 s

Men's Road Time Trial (46.8 km)

- Cadel Evans – Gold, 1 hour 53.50 s
- Michael Rogers – Silver, 1 hour 2 min 50.36 s
- Nathan O'Neill – Bronze, 1 hour 3 min 20.69 s

Men's Sprint

- Ryan Bayley – Gold, 10.659 s
- Sean Eadie – Silver, xxx s
- Jobie Dajka – Bronze, xxx s

=== Netball ===
With a team captained by Kathryn Harby-Williams, featuring Catherine Cox, Sharelle McMahon, Nicole Richardson and Peta Squire and coached by Jill McIntosh, Australia won the netball at the 2002 Commonwealth Games after defeating New Zealand 57–55 in the gold medal match. The match was tied at 46–46 at the end of normal time, and 14 minutes of extra-time saw the sides still level at 55–55. In sudden death extra-time, Sharelle McMahon scored the vital point to give Australia the necessary two-goal gap to win the gold medal.

Pool B

27 July 2002	Australia	75–28	Barbados
20:30	Sharelle McMahon 24; Catherine Cox 22; Eloise Southby 18; Jacqui Delaney 6	Report	Cheryl Squires 16; Olivia Walcott 11

28 July 2002	Australia	83–32	Fiji
18:30	Catherine Cox 29/36 (81%); Sharelle McMahon 26; Eloise Southby 18; Jacqui Delaney 10	Report	Matelita Shaw 14; Taraima Rara 10; Paulini Tora 8

29 July 2002	Australia	74–38	South Africa
13:00	Catherine Cox 39/50 (78%); Sharelle McMahon 18; Eloise Southby 17	Report	Sindiswe Gumede 27/29 (93%); Adele Jonker 4 Martha Machoga 7

30 July 2002	Australia	60–33	Jamaica
20:30	Sharelle McMahon 23; Eloise Southby 20; Catherine Cox 17	Report	Elaine Davis 22; Simone Forbes 11

Table

Pos	Team	P	W	D	L	GF	GA	GD	Pts
1	Australia	4	4	0	0	292	131	+161	8
2	Jamaica	4	3	0	1	248	168	+80	6
3	South Africa	4	2	0	2	201	219	-18	4
4	Barbados	4	1	0	3	131	240	-109	2
5	Fiji	4	0	0	4	151	265	-114	0

Qualified for Major semi-finals
Qualified for Minor Semi-finals
Qualified for 7th/10th classification

Major semi-finals

2 August 2002	Australia	49–38	England
20:30	Eloise Southby 28; Sharelle McMahon 15; Jacqui Delaney 6		Joanne Steed 19; Abby Teare 17; Alex Astle 2

Gold Medal Match

4 August 2002	Australia	57–55	New Zealand
13:00	Sharelle McMahon 33; Catherine Cox 15; Eloise Southby 9		Irene van Dyk 35; Donna Loffhagen 20	Attendance: 10,000

Squad

Australia roster
Players
Coaches

Name	Pos	DOB	Height	Club	Nat	Caps
Catherine Cox	GS, GA	24 May 1976 (aged 26)	1.88 m (6 ft 2 in)	Sydney Swifts
Alison Broadbent			–
Jacqui Delaney	GA, WA		–	Adelaide Thunderbirds
Liz Ellis	GK	17 January 1973 (aged 29)	1.83 m (6 ft 0 in)	Sydney Swifts
Kathryn Harby-Williams (c)	GD, WD	16 July 1969 (aged 33)	1.79 m (5 ft 10 in)	Adelaide Thunderbirds
Alexandra Hodge	WA, C	30 September 1977 (aged 24)	1.70 m (5 ft 7 in)
Janine Ilitch	GD, GK	27 January 1972 (aged 30)	1.83 m (6 ft 0 in)	Melbourne Kestrels
Sharelle McMahon	GA, GS	12 August 1977 (aged 24)	1.77 m (5 ft 10 in)	Melbourne Phoenix
Nicole Richardson	C, WD	26 June 1970 (aged 32)	–	Melbourne Kestrels
Rebecca Sanders			–
Eloise Southby	GA, GS	6 July 1976 (aged 26)	1.87 m (6 ft 2 in)	Melbourne Phoenix
Peta Squire	WD, C, GD	17 January 1976 (aged 26)	1.80 m (5 ft 11 in)	Adelaide Thunderbirds

Head coach

- Jill McIntosh

Notes

- (c) – Captain
- (cc) – Co-captain
- (vc) – Vice-captain
- – Injury / maternity leave
- (TRP) – Temporary Replacement Player

=== Swimming ===
Men

Athlete	Event	Heat		Semifinal		Final	
Athlete	Event	Time	Rank	Time	Rank	Time	Rank
Ashley Callus	50 m freestyle	22.93	3 Q	22.67	5 Q	22.67	5
Brett Hawke	50 m freestyle	22.67	1 Q	22.29 GR	1 Q	22.34	2nd place, silver medalist(s)
Todd Pearson	50 m freestyle	23.59	11 Q	DNS		Did not advance	
Ben Austin	EAD 50 m freestyle	27.48 WR	1 Q	—N/a		27.59	1st place, gold medalist(s)
Alex Harris	EAD 50 m freestyle	29.50 GR	=7 Q	—N/a		29.00	6
Ashley Callus	100 m freestyle	50.16	4 Q	50.05	4 Q	49.45	2nd place, silver medalist(s)
Todd Pearson	100 m freestyle	50.07	3 Q	50.13	5 Q	50.12	5
Ian Thorpe	100 m freestyle	49.76	1 Q	49.31 GR	1 Q	48.73 GR	1st place, gold medalist(s)
Ben Austin	EAD 100 m freestyle	1:00.27 WR	1 Q	—N/a		1:00.21 WR	1st place, gold medalist(s)
Alex Harris	EAD 100 m freestyle	1:06.71	9	—N/a		Did not advance	
Jason Cram	200 m freestyle	1:50.56	7 Q	—N/a		1:50.30	6
Grant Hackett	200 m freestyle	1:49.22	2 Q	—N/a		1:46.13	2nd place, silver medalist(s)
Ian Thorpe	200 m freestyle	1:48.50	1 Q	—N/a		1:44.71 GR	1st place, gold medalist(s)
Grant Hackett	400 m freestyle	3:49.13	2 Q	—N/a		3:43.48	2nd place, silver medalist(s)
Craig Stevens	400 m freestyle	3:52.78	5 Q	—N/a		3:49.84	4
Ian Thorpe	400 m freestyle	3:47.24	1 Q	—N/a		3:40.08 WR	1st place, gold medalist(s)
Grant Hackett	1500 m freestyle	15:20.63	1 Q	—N/a		14:54.29	1st place, gold medalist(s)
Craig Stevens	1500 m freestyle	15:26.92	3 Q	—N/a		15:09.24	3rd place, bronze medalist(s)
Ethan Rolff	50 m backstroke	26.52	5 Q	26.23	5 Q	26.47	6
Robert van der Zant	50 m backstroke	26.91	14 Q	26.45	7 Q	26.67	8
Matt Welsh	50 m backstroke	26.04	1 Q	25.86 GR	1 Q	25.65 GR	1st place, gold medalist(s)
Ethan Rolff	100 m backstroke	57.04	4 Q	56.83	6 Q	56.98	7
Ian Thorpe	100 m backstroke	56.45	2 Q	56.49	4 Q	55.38	2nd place, silver medalist(s)
Matt Welsh	100 m backstroke	56.35	1 Q	55.91	1 Q	54.72 GR	1st place, gold medalist(s)
Leigh McBean	200 m backstroke	2:02.54	4 Q	—N/a		2:01.22	4
Ethan Rolff	200 m backstroke	2:02.63	6 Q	—N/a		2:01.65	5
Matt Welsh	200 m backstroke	DQ		—N/a		Did not advance	
Jim Piper	50 m breaststroke	29.96	7 Q	30.03	8 Q	30.45	8
Robert van der Zant	50 m breaststroke	29.55	6 Q	28.93	6 Q	WD	
Regan Harrison	100 m breastsroke	1:03.31	10 Q	1:02.81	9	Did not advance	
Justin Norris	100 m breastsroke	1:03.43	12 Q	1:03.34	11	Did not advance	
Jim Piper	100 m breastsroke	1:02.88	6 Q	1:02.68	7 Q	1:02.68	7
Regan Harrison	200 m breaststroke	2:15.60	4 Q	—N/a		2:15.86	7
Justin Norris	200 m breaststroke	2:17.92	10	—N/a		Did not advance	
Jim Piper	200 m breaststroke	2:15.21	=1 Q	—N/a		2:13.10	1st place, gold medalist(s)
Brett Hawke	50 m butterfly	24.58	4 Q	24.45	6 Q	24.21	5
Geoff Huegill	50 m butterfly	24.10	1 Q	23.62 GR	1 Q	23.57 GR	1st place, gold medalist(s)
Adam Pine	50 m butterfly	24.48	2 Q	24.11	3 Q	24.22	6
Geoff Huegill	100 m butterfly	54.18	3 Q	52.36 GR	1 Q	52.36	1st place, gold medalist(s)
Heath Ramsay	100 m butterfly	55.32	11 Q	55.42	12	Did not advance	
Adam Pine	100 m butterfly	54.44	6 Q	53.47	3 Q	53.02	3rd place, bronze medalist(s)
Grant McGregor	200 m butterfly	2:01.55	8 Q	—N/a		2:03.23	8
Justin Norris	200 m butterfly	1:58.19	1 Q	—N/a		1:56.95 GR	1st place, gold medalist(s)
Heath Ramsay	200 m butterfly	2:00.71	5 Q	—N/a		2:00.42	6
Justin Norris	200 m individual medley	2:03.08	1 Q	—N/a		2:01.32	1st place, gold medalist(s)
Robert van der Zant	200 m individual medley	2:04.00	9	—N/a		Did not advance	
Grant McGregor	400 m individual medley	4:24.40	7 Q	—N/a		WD	
Justin Norris	400 m individual medley	4:21.72	3 Q	—N/a		4:16.95 GR	1st place, gold medalist(s)
Ashley Callus; Leon Dunne*; Grant Hackett; Todd Pearson; Adam Pine*; Ian Thorpe	4 × 100 m freestyle relay	3:20.70	1 Q	—N/a		3:16.42 GR	1st place, gold medalist(s)
Jason Cram; Leon Dunne; Grant Hackett; Ian Thorpe	4 × 200 m freestyle relay	—N/a				7:11.69 GR	1st place, gold medalist(s)
Geoff Huegill; Jim Piper; Ian Thorpe; Matt Welsh	4 × 100 m medley relay	—N/a				3:36.05 GR	1st place, gold medalist(s)

Women

Athlete	Event	Heat		Semifinal		Final	
Athlete	Event	Time	Rank	Time	Rank	Time	Rank
Jodie Henry	50 m freestyle	25.86	4 Q	25.47	2 Q	25.37	2nd place, silver medalist(s)
Alice Mills	50 m freestyle	25.65 GR	3 Q	25.64	4 Q	25.81	4
Sarah Ryan	50 m freestyle	26.28	=9 Q	26.15	11	Did not advance	
Kate Bailey	EAD 50 m freestyle	33.13	7 Q	—N/a		32.82	7
Dianna Ley	EAD 50 m freestyle	31.80	4 Q	—N/a		31.79	4
Jodie Henry	100 m freestyle	55.79	1 Q	55.43	1 Q	55.45	1st place, gold medalist(s)
Sarah Ryan	100 m freestyle	56.36	4 Q	56.07	4 Q	56.20	8
Petria Thomas	100 m freestyle	56.64	6 Q	56.45	8 Q	55.99	5
Kate Bailey	EAD 100 m freestyle	1:10.79	9	—N/a		Did not advance	
Dianna Ley	EAD 100 m freestyle	1:07.75	6 Q	—N/a		1:07.54	4
Elka Graham	200 m freestyle	2:01.23	5 Q	—N/a		2:00.07	= (bronze)
Giaan Rooney	200 m freestyle	2:01.73	8 Q	—N/a		2:01.03	7
Petria Thomas	200 m freestyle	2:01.08	2 Q	—N/a		2:00.07	= (bronze)
Elka Graham	400 m freestyle	4:15.14	3 Q	—N/a		4:11.47	2nd place, silver medalist(s)
Amanda Pascoe	400 m freestyle	4:15.30	4 Q	—N/a		4:14.74	5
Amanda Pascoe	800 m freestyle	8:40.88	2 Q	—N/a		8:34.19	2nd place, silver medalist(s)
Jennifer Reilly	800 m freestyle	8:43.77	4 Q	—N/a		8:41.79	4
Dyana Calub	50 m backstroke	29.33	2 Q	29.07 GR	1 Q	28.98 GR	1st place, gold medalist(s)
Rebecca Creedy	50 m backstroke	30.48	12 Q	30.26	11	Did not advance	
Giaan Rooney	50 m backstroke	29.44	4 Q	29.15	3 Q	29.11	4
Dyana Calub	100 m backstroke	1:02.06 GR	2 Q	1:02.06	2 Q	1:01.86	2nd place, silver medalist(s)
Giaan Rooney	100 m backstroke	1:03.00	9 Q	1:02.20	3 Q	1:02.22	3rd place, bronze medalist(s)
Clementine Stoney	100 m backstroke	1:02.78	6 Q	1:02.93	8 Q	1:03:30	7
Clementine Stoney	200 m backstroke	2:13.35	4 Q	—N/a		2:12.64	6
Kelly Tucker	200 m backstroke	2:13.60	6 Q	—N/a		2:13.94	7
Nicole Irving	50 m butterfly	22.72	2 Q	27.19	2 Q	27.13	2nd place, silver medalist(s)
Sarah Ryan	50 m butterfly	28.23	=12 Q	28.33	16	Did not advance	
Petria Thomas	50 m butterfly	27.09	1 Q	27.09	1 Q	26.66 GR	1st place, gold medalist(s)
Rachel Coffee	100 m butterfly	1:00.61	2 Q	1:00.89	6 Q	1:01.24	7
Alice Mills	100 m butterfly	1:01.93	9 Q	1:01.69	9	Did not advance	
Petria Thomas	100 m butterfly	58.45 GR	1 Q	1:00.15	1 Q	58.57	1st place, gold medalist(s)
Rachel Coffee	200 m butterfly	2:16.89	8 Q	—N/a		2:16.95	8
Petria Thomas	200 m butterfly	2:09.05	1 Q	—N/a		2:08.40	1st place, gold medalist(s)
Sarah Katsoulis	50 m breaststroke	32.32	=4 Q	32.54	7 Q	32.86	8
Leisel Jones	50 m breaststroke	32.32	=4 Q	31.99	2 Q	32.01	4
Tarnee White	50 m breaststroke	31.74	2 Q	32.04	3 Q	31.74	3rd place, bronze medalist(s)
Brooke Hanson	100 m breaststroke	1:09.93	3 Q	1:09.00	2 Q	1:09.10	2nd place, silver medalist(s)
Leisel Jones	100 m breaststroke	1:09.94	4 Q	1:08.31	1 Q	1:08.74	1st place, gold medalist(s)
Tarnee White	100 m breaststroke	1:09.82	2 Q	1:09.19	3 Q	1:09.63	4
Brooke Hanson	200 m breaststroke	2:30.60	4 Q	—N/a		2:29.55	4
Leisel Jones	200 m breaststroke	2:27.30	1 Q	—N/a		2:25.93	1st place, gold medalist(s)
Kelli Waite	200 m breaststroke	2:29.23	2 Q	—N/a		2:28.58	3rd place, bronze medalist(s)
Jessica Abbott	200 m individual medley	2:17.50	7 Q	—N/a		2:17.00	6
Alice Mills	200 m individual medley	2:17.34	5 Q	—N/a		2:16.35	5
Jennifer Reilly	200 m individual medley	2:15.54	1 Q	—N/a		2:14.99	2nd place, silver medalist(s)
Jessica Abbott	400 m individual medley	4:51.25	6 Q	—N/a		4:47.11	3rd place, bronze medalist(s)
Jennifer Reilly	400 m individual medley	4:44.57	1 Q	—N/a		4:43.59	1st place, gold medalist(s)
Yvette Rodier	400 m individual medley	4:49.34	3 Q	—N/a		4:52.29	6
Jodie Henry; Alice Mills; Sarah Ryan; Petria Thomas	4 × 100 m freestyle relay	—N/a				3:40.41 GR	1st place, gold medalist(s)
Rebecca Creedy; Elka Graham; Giaan Rooney; Petria Thomas	4 × 200 m freestyle relay	—N/a				8:01.91	2nd place, silver medalist(s)
Dyana Calub; Jodie Henry; Leisel Jones; Petria Thomas	4 × 100 m medley relay	—N/a				4:03.70 GR	1st place, gold medalist(s)

=== Triathlon ===
Athlete	Event	Swim (1.5 km)	Trans 1	Bike (40 km)	Trans 2	Run (10 km)	Total Time	Rank
Chris McCormack	Men's	18:27.9	18.4	1:00:39.1	21.6	32:51.7	1:52:46.80	5
Peter Robertson	Men's	18:16.0	18.4	1:02:05.2	18.2	32:39.9	1:53:37.79	9
Miles Stewart	Men's	18:11.4	23.9	1:02:03.1	21.4	31:00.3	1:52:00.27	2nd place, silver medalist(s)
Nicole Hackett	Women's	19:01.1	25.2	1:08:01.6	18.8	35:54.0	2:03:42.81	3rd place, bronze medalist(s)
Loretta Harrop	Women's	19:02.3	29.9	1:12:31.4	23.9	DNF		
Michellie Jones	Women's	19:21.9	34.7	1:10:03.7	22.4	35:28.1	2:05:51.01	6
