= Swimming at the 2002 Commonwealth Games – Women's 200 metre freestyle =

Women's 200 metre freestyle at the 2002 Commonwealth Games
- Venue: Manchester Aquatics Centre
- Dates: 30 July 2002
- Competitors: 23 from 14 nations
- Winning time: 1:59.69

Medalists
gold medal	Karen Pickering	England
silver medal	Karen Legg	England
bronze medal	Elka Graham	Australia
bronze medal	Petria Thomas	Australia

The Women's 200 metre freestyle event at the 2002 Commonwealth Games was held on 30 July at the Manchester Aquatics Centre.

== Records ==
Prior to this competition, the existing records were as follows:

World record	Franziska van Almsick (GER)	1:56.78	Rome, Italy	6 September 1994
Commonwealth record				
Games record				

The following records were established during the competition:

Date	Event	Name	Nationality	Time	Record
30 July	Final	Karen Pickering	England	1:59.69	GR

== Results ==
=== Heats ===
The 8 fastest swimmers in the heats qualified for the semifinals.

Rank	Heat	Lane	Name	Nationality	Time	Notes
1	3	5	Karen Pickering	England	2:00.89	Q
2	1	5	Petria Thomas	Australia	2:01.08	Q
3	3	3	Jessica Deglau	Canada	2:01.13	Q
4	2	5	Karen Legg	England	2:01.18	Q
5	3	4	Elka Graham	Australia	2:01.23	Q
6	1	4	Helene Muller	South Africa	2:01.68	Q
7	1	6	Jennifer Button	Canada	2:01.71	Q
8	2	4	Giaan Rooney	Australia	2:01.73	Q
9	2	6	Janelle Atkinson	Jamaica	2:02.18	
10	1	3	Sophie Simard	Canada	2:02.62	
11	3	2	Karen Nisbet	Scotland	2:02.76	
12	2	3	Mandy Leach	Zimbabwe	2:03.51	
13	3	6	Janine Belton	England	2:03.65	
14	2	2	Bethan Francis Coole	Wales	2:04.37	
15	2	7	Mackenzie Howe	Wales	2:05.53	
16	1	2	Catrin Davies	Wales	2:05.73	
17	3	7	Melissa Ingram	New Zealand	2:07.04	
18	1	7	Christel Bouvron	Singapore	2:08.35	
19	3	1	Angela Chuck	Jamaica	2:09.20	
20	2	1	Kaitlyn Elphinstone	Cayman Islands	2:11.97	
21	3	8	Anna-Liza Mopio-Jane	Papua New Guinea	2:12.75	
22	2	8	Roberta Callus	Malta	2:14.25	
23	1	1	Elaine Reyes	Gibraltar	2:18.26	

=== Final ===
The final was held on 30 July at 19:00.

Rank	Lane	Name	Nationality	Time	Notes
1st place, gold medalist(s)	4	Karen Pickering	England	1:59.69	GR
2nd place, silver medalist(s)	6	Karen Legg	England	1:59.86	
3rd place, bronze medalist(s)	2	Elka Graham	Australia	2:00.07	
3rd place, bronze medalist(s)	5	Petria Thomas	Australia	2:00.07	
5	7	Helene Muller	South Africa	2:00.77	
6	3	Jessica Deglau	Canada	2:00.85	
7	8	Giaan Rooney	Australia	2:01.03	
8	1	Jennifer Button	Canada	2:03.69	
