= Swimming at the 2002 Commonwealth Games – Women's 100 metre freestyle =

Women's 100 metres freestyle at the 2002 Commonwealth Games
- Venue: Manchester Aquatics Centre
- Dates: 1–2 August 2002
- Competitors: 34 from 25 nations
- Winning time: 55.45

Medalists
gold medal	Jodie Henry	Australia
silver medal	Helene Muller	South Africa
bronze medal	Karen Legg	England

The Women's 100 metres freestyle event at the 2002 Commonwealth Games took place 31 July-1 August. The heats and the semi were held on 31 July, the final on 1 August.

== Records ==
Prior to this competition, the existing world record was as follows;

World record	Inge de Bruijn (NED)	53.77	Sydney, Australia	20 September 2000
Commonwealth record				
Games record	Sue Rolph (ENG)	55.17	Kuala Lumpur, Malaysia	12 September 1998

== Results ==
=== Heats ===
The 16 fastest swimmers in the heats qualified for the semifinals.

Rank	Heat	Lane	Name	Nationality	Time	Notes
1	4	4	Jodie Henry	Australia	55.79	Q
2	4	5	Alison Sheppard	Scotland	56.04	Q
3	5	3	Karen Legg	England	56.22	Q
4	5	4	Sarah Ryan	Australia	56.36	Q
5	4	3	Helene Muller	South Africa	56.43	Q
6	3	5	Petria Thomas	Australia	56.64	Q
7	3	4	Melanie Marshall	England	56.65	Q
8	5	5	Karen Pickering	England	56.74	Q
9	3	3	Laura Nicholls	Canada	56.86	Q
10	3	7	Caroline Pickering	Fiji	56.94	Q
11	3	2	Joscelin Yeo	Singapore	57.30	Q
12	5	6	Mandy Leach	Zimbabwe	57.36	Q
13	4	6	Catrin Davies	Wales	57.49	Q
14	5	7	Laura Pomeroy	Canada	57.51	Q
15	4	7	Toni Jeffs	New Zealand	57.72	Q
16	5	2	Julie Douglas	Northern Ireland	57.84	Q
17	3	6	Leah Martindale	Barbados	57.88	
18	4	2	Jenna Gresdal	Canada	57.97	
19	3	1	Angela Chuck	Jamaica	58.44	
20	4	1	Mackenzie Howe	Wales	58.62	
21	5	1	Julia Martin	Wales	59.10	
22	2	4	Anna-Liza Mopio-Jane	Papua New Guinea	59.58	
23	2	5	Linda McEachrane	Trinidad and Tobago	59.60	
24	4	8	Nikia Deveaux	Bahamas	1:00.79	
25	5	8	Sharntelle McLean	Trinidad and Tobago	1:00.99	
26	2	6	Emily Crookall-Nixon	Isle of Man	1:01.10	
27	2	2	Gail Strobridge	Guernsey	1:01.71	
28	2	3	Elaine Reyes	Gibraltar	1:02.31	
29	3	8	Kiera Aitken	Bermuda	1:03.50	
30	2	7	Nathalie Lee Baw	Mauritius	1:04.23	
31	2	1	Keren Lee Visser	Malawi	1:05.14	
32	1	4	Ursula Kuenzli	Zambia	1:07.32	
33	1	3	Sana Abdul Wahid	Pakistan	1:10.34	
34	1	5	Olivia Aya Nakitanda	Uganda	1:11.03	

=== Semifinals ===
The eight fastest swimmers from the semifinals progressed to the final.

Rank	Semi-final	Lane	Name	Nationality	Time	Notes
1	2	4	Jodie Henry	Australia	55.43	Q
2	2	5	Karen Legg	England	55.94	Q
3	2	3	Helene Muller	South Africa	56.05	Q
4	1	5	Sarah Ryan	Australia	56.07	Q
5	1	6	Karen Pickering	England	56.10	Q
5	1	4	Alison Sheppard	Scotland	56.10	Q
7	2	6	Melanie Marshall	England	56.27	Q
8	1	3	Petria Thomas	Australia	56.45	Q
9	2	2	Laura Nicholls	Canada	56.46	
10	1	7	Mandy Leach	Zimbabwe	56.89	
11	2	7	Joscelin Yeo	Singapore	57.13	
12	1	1	Laura Pomeroy	Canada	57.48	
13	2	1	Catrin Davies	Wales	57.59	
14	1	8	Julie Douglas	Northern Ireland	57.96	
15	1	2	Caroline Pickering	Fiji	58.11	
16	2	8	Toni Jeffs	New Zealand	58.27	

=== Final ===
The final was held on 1 August at 19:06.

Rank	Lane	Name	Nationality	Time	Notes
1st place, gold medalist(s)	4	Jodie Henry	Australia	55.45	
2nd place, silver medalist(s)	3	Helene Muller	South Africa	55.60	
3rd place, bronze medalist(s)	5	Karen Legg	England	55.86	
4	2	Karen Pickering	England	55.95	
5	8	Petria Thomas	Australia	55.99	
6	7	Alison Sheppard	Scotland	56.05	
7	1	Melanie Marshall	England	56.19	
8	6	Sarah Ryan	Australia	56.20	
