= Swimming at the 2002 Commonwealth Games – Women's 100 metre butterfly =

Women's 100 metre butterfly at the 2002 Commonwealth Games
- Venue: Manchester Aquatics Centre
- Dates: 1 August (heats & semifinals); 2 August (final)
- Competitors: 23 from 16 nations
- Winning time: 58.57

Medalists
gold medal	Petria Thomas	Australia
silver medal	Mandy Loots	South Africa
bronze medal	Jen Button	Canada

The women's 100 metre butterfly event at the 2002 Commonwealth Games as part of the swimming programme took place on 1 and 2 August at the Manchester Aquatics Centre in Manchester, England.

== Records ==
Prior to this competition, the existing world and games records were as follows.

World record	(Netherlands) Inge de Bruijn	56.61	Sydney, Australia	17 September 2000
Games record	(Australia) Petria Thomas	59.42	Kuala Lumpur, Malaysia	

== Schedule ==
The schedule was as follows:

All times are local time

Date	Time	Round
Thursday 1 August	10:47	Heats
Thursday 1 August	19:30	Semifinals
Friday 2 August	19:00	Final

== Results ==
=== Heats ===
The 16 fastest swimmers in the heats qualified for the semifinals.

Rank	Heat	Lane	Name	Nationality	Time	Notes
1	3	4	Petria Thomas	Australia	58.45	Q, GR
2	1	5	Rachel Coffee	Australia	1:00.61	Q
3	2	5	Jen Button	Canada	1:00.67	Q
4	2	4	Mandy Loots	South Africa	1:00.70	Q
5	3	5	Georgie Lee	England	1:00.84	Q
6	1	4	Audrey Lacroix	Canada	1:01.07	Q
7	2	3	Joscelin Yeo	Singapore	1:01.22	Q
8	1	1	Maria Papadopoulou	Cyprus	1:01.80	Q
9	1	3	Alice Mills	Australia	1:01.93	Q
10	3	3	Mandy Leach	Zimbabwe	1:02.24	Q
11	2	6	Jessica Deglau	Canada	1:02.33	Q
12	3	6	Margaretha Pedder	England	1:02.45	Q
13	1	6	Bethan Francis Coole	Wales	1:03.44	Q
14	3	2	Elizabeth Van Welie	New Zealand	1:03.48	Q
15	2	2	Gemma Mary Howells	Wales	1:03.50	Q
16	1	2	Christel Bouvron	Singapore	1:03.81	Q
17	3	8	Natalia Roumbina	Cyprus	1:04.14	
18	3	7	Tamara Swaby	Jamaica	1:04.25	
19	1	7	Angela Galea	Malta	1:04.55	
20	3	1	Sharntelle McLean	Trinidad and Tobago	1:05.25	
21	2	7	Heather Roffey	Cayman Islands	1:06.07	
22	2	1	Emily Crookall-Nixon	Isle of Man	1:07.28	
23	2	8	Sana Abdul Wahid	Pakistan	1:15.12	

=== Semifinals ===
The 8 fastest swimmers in the semifinals qualified for the final.

Jessica Deglau did not participate in the semifinals, and so Natalia Roumbina took the spot instead.

Rank	Heat	Lane	Name	Nationality	Time	Notes
1	2	4	Petria Thomas	Australia	1:00.15	Q
2	1	5	Mandy Loots	South Africa	1:00.18	Q
3	2	5	Jen Button	Canada	1:00.19	Q
4	2	3	Georgie Lee	England	1:00.50	Q
5	1	3	Audrey Lacroix	Canada	1:00.51	Q
6	1	4	Rachel Coffee	Australia	1:00.89	Q
7	2	6	Joscelin Yeo	Singapore	1:00.99	Q
8	1	2	Mandy Leach	Zimbabwe	1:01.13	Q
9	2	2	Alice Mills	Australia	1:01.69	
10	1	6	Maria Papadopoulou	Cyprus	1:01.83	
11	2	7	Margaretha Pedder	England	1:02.48	
12	1	1	Gemma Mary Howells	Wales	1:02.60	
13	2	1	Elizabeth Van Welie	New Zealand	1:03.55	
14	1	7	Bethan Francis Coole	Wales	1:03.76	
15	2	8	Christel Bouvron	Singapore	1:03.79	
16	1	8	Natalia Roumbina	Cyprus	1:05.49	

=== Final ===
The final was held on 2 August at 19:00.

Rank	Lane	Name	Nationality	Time	Notes
1st place, gold medalist(s)	4	Petria Thomas	Australia	58.57	
2nd place, silver medalist(s)	5	Mandy Loots	South Africa	59.68	
3rd place, bronze medalist(s)	3	Jen Button	Canada	1:00.22	
4	6	Georgie Lee	England	1:00.58	
5	2	Audrey Lacroix	Canada	1:00.88	
6	1	Joscelin Yeo	Singapore	1:01.14	
7	7	Rachel Coffee	Australia	1:01.24	
8	8	Mandy Leach	Zimbabwe	1:01.43	
