= Swimming at the 2002 Commonwealth Games – Women's 4 × 100 metre medley relay =

Women's 4 × 100 metre medley relay at the 2002 Commonwealth Games
- Venue: Manchester Aquatics Centre
- Dates: 4 August
- Competitors: 28 from 7 nations
- Winning time: 4:03.70

Medalists
gold medal	Dyana Calub, Leisel Jones, Petria Thomas, Jodie Henry	Australia
silver medal	Charlene Wittstock, Sarah Poewe, Mandy Loots, Helene Muller	South Africa
bronze medal	Sarah Price, Kate Haywood, Georgie Lee, Karen Legg	England

The women's 4 × 100 metre medley relay event at the 2002 Commonwealth Games as part of the swimming programme took place on 4 August at the Manchester Aquatics Centre in Manchester, England.

== Records ==
Prior to this competition, the existing world and games records were as follows.

World record	United States; Barbara Bedford; Megan Quann; Jenny Thompson; Dara Torres	3:58.30	Sydney, Australia	23 September 2000
Games record	Australia; Giaan Rooney; Helen Denman; Petria Thomas; Susie O'Neill	4:06.36	Kuala Lumpur, Malaysia	

== Results ==
The straight final was held on 4 August at 18:51.

Rank	Lane	Nation	Swimmers	Time	Notes
1st place, gold medalist(s)	4	Australia	Dyana Calub; Leisel Jones; Petria Thomas; Jodie Henry	4:03.70	GR
2nd place, silver medalist(s)	7	South Africa	Charlene Wittstock; Sarah Poewe; Mandy Loots; Helene Muller	4:05.06	
3rd place, bronze medalist(s)	5	England	Sarah Price; Kate Haywood; Georgie Lee; Karen Legg	4:05.65	
4	3	Canada	Erin Gammel; Rhiannon Leier; Jennifer Button; Laura Nicholls	4:07.25	
5	6	Scotland	Louise Coull; Kirsty Balfour; Kerry Martin; Alison Sheppard	4:11.40	
6	2	Wales	Bethan Francis Coole; Georgia Holderness; Gemma Howells; Catrin Davies	4:20.62	
7	1	Cyprus	Antri Hadjiantoniou; Karolina Pelendritou; Natalia Roubina; Maria Papadopoulou	4:41.77	
