= Swimming at the 2002 Commonwealth Games – Women's 4 × 200 metre freestyle relay =

Women's 4 × 200 metre freestyle relay at the 2002 Commonwealth Games
- Venue: Manchester Aquatics Centre
- Dates: 1 August
- Competitors: 16 from 4 nations
- Winning time: 8:01.39

Medalists
gold medal	Joanna Fargus, Georgina Lee, Karen Legg, Karen Pickering	England
silver medal	Rebecca Creedy, Elka Graham, Giaan Rooney, Petria Thomas	Australia

The women's 4 × 200 metre freestyle relay event at the 2002 Commonwealth Games as part of the swimming programme took place on 1 August at the Manchester Aquatics Centre in Manchester, England.

== Records ==
Prior to this competition, the existing world and games records were as follows.

World record	East Germany	7:55.47	Strasbourg, France	18 August 1987

The following records were established during the competition:

Date	Event	Nation	Swimmers	Time	Record
1 August	Final	England	Karen Legg (2:00.62); Georgina Lee (2:00.31); Joanna Fargus (2:01.05); Karen Pickering (1:59.41)	8:01.39	GR

== Results ==
The final was held at 20:32.

Rank	Lane	Nation	Swimmers	Time	Notes
1st place, gold medalist(s)	5	England	Karen Legg (2:00.62); Georgina Lee (2:00.31); Joanna Fargus (2:01.05); Karen Pickering (1:59.41)	8:01.39	GR
2nd place, silver medalist(s)	4	Australia	Elka Graham (2:00.64); Giaan Rooney (2:00.05); Rebecca Creedy (2:01.43); Petria Thomas (1:59.79)	8:01.91	
3	3	Canada	Jessica Deglau (2:00.97); Marianne Limpert (2:01.17); Jennifer Button (2:01.13); Sophie Simard (2:01.29)	8:04.66	
4	6	Wales	Bethan Coole; Catrin Davies; Mackenzie Howe; Dawn Jason	8:25.23	
