= Swimming at the 2002 Commonwealth Games – Women's 100 metre backstroke =

Women's 100 metre backstroke at the 2002 Commonwealth Games
- Venue: Manchester Aquatics Centre
- Dates: 31 July (heats & semifinals); 1 August (final)
- Competitors: 21 from 13 nations
- Winning time: 1:01.06

Medalists
gold medal	Sarah Price	England
silver medal	Dyana Calub	Australia
bronze medal	Giaan Rooney	Australia

The women's 100 metre backstroke event at the 2002 Commonwealth Games as part of the swimming programme took place on 31 July and 1 August at the Manchester Aquatics Centre in Manchester, England.

== Records ==
Prior to this competition, the existing world and games records were as follows.

World record	(China) He Cihong	1:00.16	Rome, Italy	10 September 1994
Games record	(Australia) Giaan Rooney	1:02.43	Kuala Lumpur, Malaysia	

== Schedule ==
The schedule was as follows:

All times are local time

Date	Time	Round
Wednesday 31 July	10:14	Heats
Wednesday 31 July	20:39	Semifinals
Thursday 1 August	20:08	Final

== Results ==
=== Heats ===
The 16 fastest swimmers in the heats qualified for the semifinals.

Rank	Heat	Lane	Name	Nationality	Time	Notes
1	3	4	Sarah Price	England	1:01.16	Q, GR
2	1	4	Dyana Calub	Australia	1:02.06	Q, GR
3	2	4	Kirsty Coventry	Zimbabwe	1:02.55	Q
4	3	3	Charlene Wittstock	South Africa	1:02.73	Q
5	2	3	Hannah McLean	New Zealand	1:02.74	Q
6	2	5	Clementine Stoney	Australia	1:02.78	Q
7	3	6	Katy Sexton	England	1:02.89	Q
8	1	5	Joanna Fargus	England	1:02.92	Q
9	3	5	Giaan Rooney	Australia	1:03.00	Q
10	1	6	Michelle Lischinsky	Canada	1:03.16	Q
11	1	3	Erin Gammel	Canada	1:03.27	Q
12	3	2	Melissa Ingram	New Zealand	1:03.55	Q
13	2	6	Kelly Stefanyshyn	Canada	1:04.48	Q
14	3	7	Bethan Francis Coole	Wales	1:06.59	Q
15	1	2	Natalie Bree	Jersey	1:07.92	Q
16	2	7	Antri Hadjiantoniou	Cyprus	1:08.25	Q
17	3	1	Mariana Chuck	Jamaica	1:09.65	
18	2	2	Kiera Aitken	Bermuda	1:11.78	
19	1	7	Rachel Fortunato	Gibraltar	1:12.57	
20	2	1	Kiran Khan	Pakistan	1:16.07	
21	1	1	Ursula Kuenzli	Zambia	1:22.64	

=== Semifinals ===
The 8 fastest swimmers in the semifinals qualified for the final.

Rank	Heat	Lane	Name	Nationality	Time	Notes
1	2	4	Sarah Price	England	1:01.14	Q, GR
2	1	4	Dyana Calub	Australia	1:02.06	Q
3	2	2	Giaan Rooney	Australia	1:02.20	Q
4	2	3	Hannah McLean	New Zealand	1:02.27	Q
5	2	5	Kirsty Coventry	Zimbabwe	1:02.55	Q
6	2	7	Erin Gammel	Canada	1:02.64	Q
7	1	6	Joanna Fargus	England	1:02.86	Q
8	1	3	Clementine Stoney	Australia	1:02.93	Q
9	1	5	Charlene Wittstock	South Africa	1:02.97	
10	3	2	Melissa Ingram	New Zealand	1:03.22	
11	1	2	Michelle Lischinsky	Canada	1:03.29	
12	2	6	Katy Sexton	England	1:03.37	
13	2	1	Kelly Stefanyshyn	Canada	1:03.47	
14	1	1	Bethan Francis Coole	Wales	1:06.41	
15	2	8	Natalie Bree	Jersey	1:08.26	
16	1	8	Antri Hadjiantoniou	Cyprus	1:08.68	

=== Final ===
The final was held on 1 August at 20:08.

Despite qualifying for the final, Joanna Fargus did not compete, with Charlene Wittstock taking the spot instead.

Rank	Lane	Name	Nationality	Time	Notes
1st place, gold medalist(s)	4	Sarah Price	England	1:01.06	GR
2nd place, silver medalist(s)	5	Dyana Calub	Australia	1:01.86	
3rd place, bronze medalist(s)	3	Giaan Rooney	Australia	1:02.22	
4	8	Charlene Wittstock	South Africa	1:02.42	
5	2	Kirsty Coventry	Zimbabwe	1:02.54	
6	6	Hannah McLean	New Zealand	1:02.94	
7	1	Clementine Stoney	Australia	1:03.30	
8	7	Erin Gammel	Canada	1:03.37	
