= Cayman Islands at the 2002 Commonwealth Games =

- Flag of the Cayman Islands
- CGF code: CAY
- CGA: Cayman Islands Olympic Committee
- Website: caymanolympic.org.ky

in Manchester, England
- Competitors: 8 in 3 sports
- Medals Ranked 33rd: Gold 0 Silver 0 Bronze 1 Total 1

Commonwealth Games appearances (overview)
- 1978; 1982; 1986; 1990; 1994; 1998; 2002; 2006; 2010; 2014; 2018; 2022; 2026; 2030

The Cayman Islands competed in the 2002 Commonwealth Games in Manchester, England from 25 July – 4 August 2002. A team of 8 athletes in 3 sports represented the country.

== Medallist ==
Medal	Name	Sport	Event	Date
Bronze	Kareem Streete-Thompson	Athletics	Men's long jump	30 July

== Athletics ==
The athletics team consisted of two athletes.

Men
Track & road events

Athlete	Event	Heat		Quarterfinal		Semifinal		Final	
Athlete	Event	Result	Rank	Result	Rank	Result	Rank	Result	Rank
Kareem Streete-Thompson	100 m	DNS		Did not advance					

Field Events

Athlete	Event	Qualification		Final	
Athlete	Event	Distance	Rank	Distance	Rank
Kareem Streete-Thompson	Long jump	7.80	4 q	7.89	3rd place, bronze medalist(s)

Women
Track & road events

Athlete	Event	Heat		Semifinal		Final	
Athlete	Event	Result	Rank	Result	Rank	Result	Rank
Cydonie Mothersille	200 m	23.14	2 Q	23.07	3 Q	22.95	5

Key

- Note–Ranks given for track events are within the athlete's heat only
- Q = Qualified for the next round
- q = Qualified for the next round as a fastest loser or, in field events, by position without achieving the qualifying target
- NR = National record
- N/A = Round not applicable for the event

== Shooting ==
Three shooters were included in the final squad.

Men

Athlete	Event	Qualification		Final	
Athlete	Event	Points	Rank	Points	Rank
Christopher Jackson	Trap singles	92	30	Did not advance	
Christopher Jackson; Edison McLean	Trap pairs	—N/a		145	13
Robert Harris	Skeet singles	93	26	Did not advance	
Edison McLean	Skeet singles	109	22	Did not advance	
Robert Harris; Edison McLean	Skeet pairs	—N/a		161	12

== Swimming ==
Three swimmers were included in the final squad.

Men

Athlete	Event	Heat		Semifinal		Final	
Athlete	Event	Time	Rank	Time	Rank	Time	Rank
Andrew Mackay	50 m backstroke	28.55	22	Did not advance			
Andrew Mackay	100 m backstroke	59.66	15 Q	59.49	15	Did not advance	
Andrew Mackay	200 m backstroke	2:09.71	14	—N/a		Did not advance	
Andrew Mackay	200 m individual medley	2:10.66	15	—N/a		Did not qualify	

Women

Athlete	Event	Heat		Semifinal		Final	
Athlete	Event	Time	Rank	Time	Rank	Time	Rank
Kaitlyn Elphinstone	200 m freestyle	2:11.97	20	—N/a		Did not advance	
Heather Roffey	100 m butterfly	1:06.07	21	Did not advance			
Kaitlyn Elphinstone	200 m butterfly	2:26.88	13	—N/a		Did not advance	
Heather Roffey	200 m butterfly	2:14.98	9	—N/a		Did not advance	
Heather Roffey	400 m individual medley	5:20.04	15	—N/a		Did not advance	
