= Swimming at the 2002 Commonwealth Games – Men's 200 metre butterfly =

Men's 200 metres butterfly at the 2002 Commonwealth Games
- Venue: Manchester Aquatics Centre
- Dates: 30 July
- Competitors: 18 from 11 nations
- Winning time: 1:56.95

Medalists
gold medal	Justin Norris	Australia
silver medal	Steve Parry	England
bronze medal	James Hickman	England

The men's 200 metres butterfly event at the 2002 Commonwealth Games was held on 30 July at the Manchester Aquatics Centre.

== Results ==
=== Heats ===
Rank	Heat	Lane	Name	Nationality	Time	Notes
1	3	4	Justin Norris	Australia	1:58.19	Q
2	3	5	James Hickman	England	1:59.16	Q
3	1	4	Steve Parry	England	1:59.74	Q
4	2	6	Jeremy Knowles	Bahamas	2:00.31	Q
5	2	4	Heath Ramsay	Australia	2:00.71	Q
6	3	3	Moss Burmester	New Zealand	2:00.75	Q
7	1	5	Adam Sioui	Canada	2:01.24	Q
8	2	5	Grant McGregor	Australia	2:01.55	Q
9	2	3	Todd Cooper	Scotland	2:01.56	
10	3	6	Theo Verster	South Africa	2:02.34	
11	1	2	Dane Harrop	Isle of Man	2:09.03	
12	1	7	Ian Powell	Guernsey	2:09.98	
13	1	6	Adam Richards	Isle of Man	2:10.15	
14	3	2	Bertrand Bristol	Seychelles	2:10.87	
15	2	2	Jean-Paul Adam	Seychelles	2:11.39	
16	2	7	Ben Lowndes	Guernsey	2:11.79	
17	3	7	Ben Wells	Papua New Guinea	2:14.82	
—	1	3	Dean Kent	New Zealand	DNS	

=== Final ===
Rank	Lane	Name	Nationality	Time	Notes
1st place, gold medalist(s)	4	Justin Norris	Australia	1:56.95	GR
2nd place, silver medalist(s)	3	Steve Parry	England	1:57.71	
3rd place, bronze medalist(s)	5	James Hickman	England	1:58.65	
4	7	Moss Burmester	New Zealand	1:59.94	
5	1	Adam Sioui	Canada	2:00.21	
6	2	Heath Ramsay	Australia	2:00.42	
7	6	Jeremy Knowles	Bahamas	2:00.50	
8	8	Grant McGregor	Australia	2:03.23	
