= Swimming at the 2002 Commonwealth Games – Women's 200 metre backstroke =

Women's 200 metre backstroke at the 2002 Commonwealth Games
- Venue: Manchester Aquatics Centre
- Dates: 3 August
- Competitors: 17 from 10 nations
- Winning time: 2:10.58

Medalists
gold medal	Sarah Price	England
silver medal	Joanna Fargus	England
bronze medal	Katy Sexton	England

The women's 200 metre backstroke event at the 2002 Commonwealth Games as part of the swimming programme took place on 3 August at the Manchester Aquatics Centre in Manchester, England.

== Records ==
Prior to this competition, the existing world and games records were as follows.

World record	(Hungary) Krisztina Egerszegi	2:06.62	Athens, Greece	25 August 1991
Games record	(New Zealand) Anna Simcic	2:12.32	Auckland, New Zealand	

== Schedule ==
The schedule was as follows:

All times are local time

Date	Time	Round
Saturday 3 August	10:22	Heats
Saturday 3 August	19:27	Final

== Results ==
=== Heats ===
The 8 fastest swimmers in the heats qualified for the final.

Rank	Heat	Lane	Name	Nationality	Time	Notes
1	3	4	Sarah Price	England	2:11.91	Q, GR
2	3	3	Katy Sexton	England	2:12.90	Q
3	2	5	Joanna Fargus	England	2:13.16	Q
4	1	4	Clementine Stoney	Australia	2:13.35	Q
5	1	5	Jennifer Fratesi	Canada	2:13.52	Q
6	2	3	Kelly Tucker	Australia	2:13.60	Q
7	2	4	Kirsty Coventry	Zimbabwe	2:13.91	Q
8	3	6	Melissa Ingram	New Zealand	2:14.34	Q
9	3	5	Elizabeth Warden	Canada	2:15.07	
10	1	3	Hannah McLean	New Zealand	2:15.11	
11	2	6	Charlene Wittstock	South Africa	2:15.69	
12	2	2	Louise Coull	Scotland	2:16.44	
13	1	6	Elizabeth Wycliffe	Canada	2:16.81	
14	3	2	Kirsty Thomson	Scotland	2:19.52	
15	1	2	Emily Crookall-Nixon	Isle of Man	2:27.10	
16	3	7	Mariana Chuck	Jamaica	2:32.72	
17	2	7	Kiran Khan	Pakistan	2:46.90	

=== Final ===
The final was held on 3 August at 19:27.

Rank	Lane	Name	Nationality	Time	Notes
1st place, gold medalist(s)	4	Sarah Price	England	2:10.58	GR
2nd place, silver medalist(s)	3	Joanna Fargus	England	2:11.60	
3rd place, bronze medalist(s)	5	Katy Sexton	England	2:12.01	
4	2	Jennifer Fratesi	Canada	2:12.35	
5	1	Kirsty Coventry	Zimbabwe	2:12.47	
6	6	Clementine Stoney	Australia	2:12.64	
7	7	Kelly Tucker	Australia	2:13.94	
8	8	Melissa Ingram	New Zealand	2:14.48	
