= Swimming at the 2002 Commonwealth Games – Men's 200 metre individual medley =

Men's 200 metre individual medley at the 2002 Commonwealth Games
- Venue: Manchester Aquatics Centre
- Dates: 3 August
- Competitors: 19 from 13 nations
- Winning time: 2:01.32

Medalists
gold medal	Justin Norris	Australia
silver medal	Adrian Turner	England
bronze medal	James Goddard	England

The men's 200 metre individual medley event at the 2002 Commonwealth Games as part of the swimming programme took place on 3 August at the Manchester Aquatics Centre in Manchester, England.

== Records ==
Prior to this competition, the existing world and games records were as follows.

World record	(Finland) Jani Sievinen	1:58.16	Rome, Italy	11 September 1994
Games record	(Australia) Matthew Dunn	2:00.26	Kuala Lumpur, Malaysia	17 September 1998

== Schedule ==
The schedule was as follows:

All times are local time

Date	Time	Round
Saturday 3 August	11:54	Heats
Saturday 3 August	20:52	Final

== Results ==
=== Heats ===
The 8 fastest swimmers in the heats qualified for the final.

Rank	Heat	Lane	Name	Nationality	Time	Notes
1	3	5	Justin Norris	Australia	2:03.08	Q
2	3	4	Brian Johns	Canada	2:03.20	Q
3	2	3	Adrian Turner	England	2:03.30	Q
4	2	5	Dean Kent	New Zealand	2:03.43	Q
5	2	6	James Goddard	England	2:03.59	Q
6	3	3	Terence Parkin	South Africa	2:03.72	Q
7	1	6	Michael Cole	Scotland	2:03.90	Q
8	2	4	Curtis Myden	Canada	2:03.91	Q
9	1	4	Robert van der Zant	Australia	2:04.00	
10	3	6	David Carry	Scotland	2:04.77	
11	3	2	Andrew Bree	Northern Ireland	2:05.00	
12	2	2	Keith Beavers	Canada	2:05.28	
13	1	5	Theo Verster	South Africa	2:05.57	
14	3	7	Jeremy Knowles	Bahamas	2:06.38	
15	1	7	Andrew Mackay	Cayman Islands	2:10.66	
16	2	7	George Demetriades	Cyprus	2:10.68	
17	3	1	Ian Powell	Guernsey	2:13.91	
18	2	1	Lateef Aliasau	Nigeria	2:31.24	
19	1	1	Andre Kuenzli	Zambia	2:33.73	

=== Final ===
The final was held on 3 August at 20:52.

Rank	Lane	Name	Nationality	Time	Notes
1st place, gold medalist(s)	4	Justin Norris	Australia	2:01.32	
2nd place, silver medalist(s)	3	Adrian Turner	England	2:02.10	
3rd place, bronze medalist(s)	2	James Goddard	England	2:02.48	
4	5	Brian Johns	Canada	2:02.68	
5	6	Dean Kent	New Zealand	2:02.99	
6	8	Curtis Myden	Canada	2:03.25	
7	7	Terence Parkin	South Africa	2:03.63	
8	1	Michael Cole	Scotland	2:04.02	
