= Swimming at the 2002 Commonwealth Games – Women's 200 metre butterfly =

Women's 200 metre butterfly at the 2002 Commonwealth Games
- Venue: Manchester Aquatics Centre
- Dates: 4 August
- Competitors: 14 from 9 nations
- Winning time: 2:08.40

Medalists
gold medal	Petria Thomas	Australia
silver medal	Georgina Lee	England
bronze medal	Margie Pedder	England

The women's 200 metre butterfly event at the 2002 Commonwealth Games was held on 4 August at the Manchester Aquatics Centre.

== Records ==
Prior to this competition, the existing world record was as follows:

World record	Susie O'Neill (AUS)	2:05.81	Sydney, Australia	17 May 2000
Commonwealth record	Susie O'Neill (AUS)	2:05.81	Sydney, Australia	17 May 2000
Games record	Susie O'Neill (AUS)	2:06.60	Kuala Lumpur, Malaysia	17 September 1998

== Results ==
=== Heats ===
Both heats were held on 4 August.

Rank	Heat	Lane	Name	Nationality	Time	Notes
1	2	4	Petria Thomas	Australia	2:09.05	Q
2	2	6	Jen Button	Canada	2:11.16	Q
3	1	4	Georgina Lee	England	2:12.07	Q
4	1	5	Margie Pedder	England	2:12.32	Q
5	1	6	Elizabeth Van Welie	New Zealand	2:13.02	Q
6	2	5	Jessica Deglau	Canada	2:13.71	Q
7	1	3	Audrey Lacroix	Canada	2:15.45	Q
8	2	2	Rachel Coffee	Australia	2:16.89	Q
9	1	2	Heather Roffey	Cayman Islands	2:19.48	
10	1	7	Angela Galea	Malta	2:21.69	
11	2	1	Christel Bouvron	Singapore	2:22.51	
12	2	7	Natalia Roubina	Cyprus	2:22.98	
13	2	8	Kaitlyn Elphinstone	Cayman Islands	2:26.88	
—	1	1	Tamara Swaby	Jamaica	DNS	

=== Final ===
The final was held on 4 August.

Rank	Lane	Name	Nationality	Time	Notes
1st place, gold medalist(s)	4	Petria Thomas	Australia	2:08.40	
2nd place, silver medalist(s)	3	Georgina Lee	England	2:10.73	
3rd place, bronze medalist(s)	6	Margie Pedder	England	2:11.60	
4	5	Jen Button	Canada	2:11.77	
5	7	Jessica Deglau	Canada	2:12.71	
6	2	Elizabeth Van Welie	New Zealand	2:13.24	
7	1	Audrey Lacroix	Canada	2:15.21	
8	8	Rachel Coffee	Australia	2:16.95	
