= Swimming at the 2002 Commonwealth Games – Women's EAD 50 metre freestyle =

Women's EAD 50 metre freestyle at the 2002 Commonwealth Games
- Venue: Manchester Aquatics Centre
- Dates: 31 July
- Competitors: 17 from 11 nations
- Winning time: -1.06

Medalists
gold medal	Natalie du Toit	South Africa
silver medal	Stéphanie Dixon	Canada
bronze medal	Danielle Campo	Canada

The Women's EAD 50 metre freestyle event at the 2002 Commonwealth Games was held on 31 July at the Manchester Aquatics Centre.

== Classification ==
The events were run on a multi-disability format, which included both physically disabled and visually impaired swimmers i.e. the International Paralympic Committee’s Swimming Classification S1 – S13.

- Classes S1 – S10 are allocated to swimmers with a physical disability ranging from swimmers with a severe disability (S1) to those with a minimal disability (S10).
- Classes S11 – S13 are allocated to swimmers with a visual impairment ranging from swimmers with no vision or may have light perception (S11) to those with some visual acuity (S13).

== Format ==
All classes, 1 through 13 swan together in 3 heats and a final event. Positions were determined by each athlete’s time relative to the current world record for the appropriate classification of the swimmer. This may have meant that the swimmer touching first may not have been the winner.

World records were time standardised to identify both the finalists and medal winners throughout the competition. This meant that the same ‘time marker’ was used in the heats and the final irrespective of whether the world record had been broken during the course of competition.

== Records ==
Prior to this competition, the existing world records were as follows;

Class	Name	Time	Location	Date
S1	Danielle Watts (ENG)	1:34.24	Sheffield, England	7 June 2002
S2	Victoria Broadribb (ENG)	1:15.46	Sydney, Australia	27 October 2000
S3	Jana Hoffmanová (CZE)	59.92	Sydney, Australia	27 October 2000
S4	Mayumi Narita (JPN)	39.23	Sydney, Australia	27 October 2000
S5	Béatrice Hess (FRA)	36.85	Sydney, Australia	27 October 2000
S6	Doramitzi González (MEX)	36.02	Sydney, Australia	28 October 2000
S7	Danielle Campo (CAN)	34.95	Christchurch, New Zealand	13 October 1998
S8	Keren Leibovitch (ISR)	31.85	Sydney, Australia	28 October 2000
S9		30.74		
S10	Jessica Sloan (CAN)	28.44	Sydney, Australia	28 October 2000
S11	Eila Nilsson (SWE)	33.02	Atlanta, United States	25 August 1996
S12	Hongyan Zhu (CHN)	28.16	Madrid, Spain	25 July 1998
S13	Yvonne Hopf (GER)	27.38	Atlanta, United States	25 August 1996

The following records were established during the competition:

Date	Event	Class	Name	Nationality	Time	Result	Record
31 July	Heats	S5	Theresa Goh	Singapore	51.05	+14.20	GR
31 July	Heats	S7	Danielle Campo	Canada	35.92	+0.97	GR
31 July	Final	S7	Danielle Campo	Canada	35.02	+0.07	GR
31 July	Heats	S8	Matia Baun Seling	Malaysia	58.85	+27.00	GR
31 July	Heats	S9	Natalie du Toit	South Africa	29.53	-1.21	WR
31 July	Heats	S10	Sarah Bailey	England	31.34	+2.90	GR
31 July	Heats	S11	Elaine Barrett	England	34.89	+1.87	GR
31 July	Final	S11	Elaine Barrett	England	34.46	+1.44	GR
31 July	Heats	S13	Rhiannon Henry	Wales	30.16	+2.78	GR
31 July	Heats	S13	Karolina Pelendritou	Cyprus	29.93	+2.55	GR
31 July	Final	S13	Karolina Pelendritou	Cyprus	29.88	+2.50	GR

== Results ==
=== Heats ===
The 8 fastest swimmers in the heats qualified for the semifinals.

Rank	Heat	Lane	Name	Class	Nationality	Time	Result	Notes
1	1	4	Natalie du Toit	S9	South Africa	29.53	-1.21	Q, WR
2	3	5	Stéphanie Dixon	S9	Canada	30.69	-0.05	Q
3	1	3	Danielle Campo	S7	Canada	35.92	+0.97	Q, GR
4	1	5	Dianna Ley	S9	Australia	31.80	+1.06	Q
5	3	6	Elaine Barrett	S11	England	34.89	+1.87	Q, GR
6	2	3	Lara Ferguson	S9	Scotland	32.75	+2.01	Q
7	3	3	Kate Bailey	S9	Australia	33.13	+2.39	Q
8	3	4	Karolina Pelendritou	S13	Cyprus	29.93	+2.55	Q, GR
9	2	4	Rhiannon Henry	S13	Wales	30.16	+2.78	GR
10	2	5	Sarah Bailey	S10	England	31.34	+2.90	GR
11	2	6	Rhian Jones	S10	Wales	35.11	+6.67	
12	1	6	Theresa Goh	S5	Singapore	51.05	+14.20	GR
13	3	2	Catherine Timpang Siang	S9	Malaysia	46.87	+16.13	
14	1	2	Matia Baun Seling	S8	Malaysia	58.85	+27.00	GR
15	2	7	Janet Nduu	S9	Kenya	1:01.86	+31.12	
16	2	2	Jennifer Wanjiru Kamande	S9	Kenya	1:14.81	+44.07	
DQ	3	7	Jacqueline Khadun	S5	Mauritius			

=== Final ===
The final was held on 31 July at 19:51.

Rank	Lane	Name	Class	Nation	Time	Result	Notes
1st place, gold medalist(s)	4	Natalie du Toit	S9	South Africa	29.68	-1.06	
2nd place, silver medalist(s)	5	Stéphanie Dixon	S9	Canada	30.60	-0.14	
3rd place, bronze medalist(s)	3	Danielle Campo	S7	Canada	35.02	+0.07	GR
4	6	Dianna Ley	S9	Australia	31.79	+1.05	
5	2	Elaine Barrett	S11	England	34.46	+1.44	GR
6	7	Lara Ferguson	S9	Scotland	32.75	+2.01	
7	1	Kate Bailey	S9	Australia	32.82	+2.08	
8	8	Karolina Pelendritou	S13	Cyprus	29.88	+2.50	GR
