= Swimming at the 2002 Commonwealth Games – Men's 100 metre backstroke =

Men's 100 metre backstroke at the 2002 Commonwealth Games
- Venue: Manchester Aquatics Centre
- Date: August 2, 2002 August 3, 2002
- Competitors: 28 from 19 nations
- Winning time: 54.72

Medalists
gold medal	Matt Welsh	Australia
silver medal	Ian Thorpe	Australia
bronze medal	Alex Lim	Malaysia

The Men's 100 metre backstroke event at the 2002 Commonwealth Games took place between 2 August 2002 and 3 August 2002 at Manchester Aquatics Centre.

== Schedule ==
All times are Coordinated Universal Time (UTC)

Date	Time	Event
Friday, 2 August 2002	11:16	Heat 1
Friday, 2 August 2002	11:19	Heat 2
Friday, 2 August 2002	10:23	Heat 3
Friday, 2 August 2002	10:26	Heat 4
Friday, 2 August 2002	19:46	Semifinal 1
Friday, 2 August 2002	19:50	Semifinal 2
Saturday, 3 August 2002	19:58	Final

== Records ==
Prior to the competition, the existing world and championship records were as follows.

	Name	Nation	Time	Location	Date
World record	Lenny Krayzelburg	United States	53.60	Sydney	24 August 1999
Games record	Mark Versfeld	Canada	55.52	Kuala Lumpur	16 September 1998

The following new records were set during this competition.

Date	Event	Name	Nation	Time	Record
3 August	Final	Matt Welsh	Australia	54.72	GR

== Results ==
=== Heats ===
The heats were held the morning session on 2 August.

Rank	Heat	Lane	Name	Nationality	Time	Notes
1	4	4	Matt Welsh	Australia	56.35	Q
2	3	4	Ian Thorpe	Australia	56.45	Q
3	3	3	Adam Ruckwood	England	56.87	Q
4	4	3	Ethan Rolff	Australia	57.04	Q
5	4	2	Martin Harris	England	57.06	Q
6	2	6	Gerhard Zandberg	South Africa	57.09	Q
7	2	4	Gregor Tait	Scotland	57.23	Q
8	3	2	Nicholas Neckles	Barbados	57.49	Q
9	2	5	Tobias Oriwol	Canada	57.70	Q
10	4	6	Simon Burnett	England	57.79	Q
11	3	5	Alex Lim	Malaysia	57.88	Q
12	3	6	James Veldman	Canada	58.20	Q
13	4	5	Riley Janes	Canada	58.41	Q
14	2	3	Cameron Gibson	New Zealand	58.50	Q
15	4	7	Andrew Mackay	Cayman Islands	59.66	Q
16	3	7	Ramon James	Jamaica	1:00.29	Q
17	2	2	Ron Cowen	Bermuda	1:00.71	
17	2	7	Dane Harrop	Isle of Man	1:00.71	
19	4	1	Ian Powell	Guernsey	1:01.08	
20	2	8	Jonathon Le Noury	Guernsey	1:03.46	
21	3	8	Folahan Oluwole	Nigeria	1:04.51	
22	4	8	Rubel Rana	Bangladesh	1:05.05	
23	1	5	Jamie Zammitt	Gibraltar	1:05.26	
24	1	3	Jean Francois Wai Choon	Mauritius	1:05.92	
25	1	4	Kabir Walia	Kenya	1:06.07	
26	2	1	Roy-Allan Burch	Bermuda	1:06.33	
27	1	6	Lateef Aliasau	Nigeria	1:06.78	
28	1	2	David Korpela	Malawi	1:14.03	

=== Semifinals ===
The semifinals were held the evening session on 2 August.

Rank	Heat	Lane	Name	Nationality	Time	Notes
1	2	4	Matt Welsh	Australia	55.91	Q
2	2	7	Alex Lim	Malaysia	56.11	Q
3	2	6	Gregor Tait	Scotland	56.32	Q
4	1	4	Ian Thorpe	Australia	56.49	Q
5	2	5	Adam Ruckwood	England	56.61	Q
6	1	5	Ethan Rolff	Australia	56.83	Q
7	1	3	Gerhard Zandberg	South Africa	57.00	Q
8	2	3	Martin Harris	England	57.26	Q
9	2	1	Riley Janes	Canada	57.28	
10	1	2	Simon Burnett	England	57.34	
11	2	2	Tobias Oriwol	Canada	57.47	
12	1	7	James Veldman	Canada	57.52	
12	1	1	Cameron Gibson	New Zealand	57.62	
14	1	6	Nicholas Neckles	Barbados	57.84	
15	2	8	Andrew Mackay	Cayman Islands	59.49	
16	1	8	Ramon James	Jamaica	1:01.08	

=== Final ===
The final were held the evening session on 3 August.

Rank	Lane	Name	Nationality	Time	Notes
1st place, gold medalist(s)	4	Matt Welsh	Australia	54.72	GR
2nd place, silver medalist(s)	6	Ian Thorpe	Australia	55.38	
3rd place, bronze medalist(s)	5	Alex Lim	Malaysia	55.44	
4	1	Gerhard Zandberg	South Africa	55.98	
5	3	Gregor Tait	Scotland	56.08	
6	2	Adam Ruckwood	England	56.65	
7	7	Ethan Rolff	Australia	56.98	
8	8	Martin Harris	England	58.40	
