= Swimming at the 2002 Commonwealth Games – Men's 200 metre breaststroke =

Men's 200 metre breaststroke at the 2002 Commonwealth Games
- Venue: Manchester Aquatics Centre
- Date: August 4, 2002
- Competitors: 17 from 10 nations
- Winning time: 2:13.10

Medalists
| gold medal | Jim Piper | Australia |
| silver medal | Terence Parkin | South Africa |
| bronze medal | Michael Brown | Canada |

The Men's 200 metre breaststroke event at the 2002 Commonwealth Games took place on 4 August 2002 at Manchester Aquatics Centre.

== Schedule ==
All times are Coordinated Universal Time (UTC)

| Date | Time | Event |
|---|---|---|
| Sunday, 4 August 2002 | 10:13 | Heat 1 |
| Sunday, 4 August 2002 | 10:18 | Heat 2 |
| Sunday, 4 August 2002 | 10:24 | Heat 3 |
| Sunday, 4 August 2002 | 17:50 | Final |

== Records ==
Prior to the competition, the existing world and championship records were as follows.

| | Name | Nation | Time | Location | Date |
|---|---|---|---|---|---|
| World record | Mike Barrowman | United States | 2:10.16 | Barcelona | 29 July 1992 |
| Games record | Nick Gillingham | England | 2:12.54 | Victoria | 22 August 1994 |

== Results ==
=== Heats ===
The heats were held the morning session on 4 August.

| Rank | Heat | Lane | Name | Nationality | Time | Notes |
|---|---|---|---|---|---|---|
| 1 | 3 | 4 | Jim Piper | Australia | 2:15.21 | Q |
| 1 | 3 | 3 | Michael Brown | Canada | 2:15.21 | Q |
| 3 | 3 | 6 | Andrew Bree | Northern Ireland | 2:15.24 | Q |
| 4 | 3 | 5 | Regan Harrison | Australia | 2:15.60 | Q |
| 5 | 2 | 4 | Terence Parkin | South Africa | 2:15.72 | Q |
| 6 | 2 | 3 | Adam Whitehead | England | 2:15.83 | Q |
| 7 | 1 | 4 | Morgan Knabe | Canada | 2:16.21 | Q |
| 7 | 1 | 5 | Ian Edmond | Scotland | 2:16.21 | Q |
| 9 | 1 | 3 | John Stamhuis | Canada | 2:16.83 | |
| 10 | 2 | 5 | Justin Norris | Australia | 2:17.92 | |
| 11 | 2 | 6 | Adrian Turner | England | 2:18.79 | |
| 12 | 1 | 6 | Michael Williamson | Northern Ireland | 2:19.23 | |
| 13 | 2 | 7 | Wickus Nienaber | Swaziland | 2:25.72 | |
| 14 | 3 | 2 | Graham Smith | Bermuda | 2:32.84 | |
| 15 | 1 | 2 | Jamie Zammitt | Gibraltar | 2:35.55 | |
| 16 | 2 | 2 | Gavin Santos | Gibraltar | 2:36.63 | |
| 17 | 3 | 7 | Chisela Kanchela | Zambia | 2:53.66 | |

=== Final ===
The final were held the evening session on 4 August.

| Rank | Lane | Name | Nationality | Time | Notes |
|---|---|---|---|---|---|
| 1st place, gold medalist(s) | 4 | Jim Piper | Australia | 2:13.10 | |
| 2nd place, silver medalist(s) | 2 | Terence Parkin | South Africa | 2:13.34 | |
| 3rd place, bronze medalist(s) | 5 | Michael Brown | Canada | 2:13.82 | |
| 4 | 7 | Adam Whitehead | England | 2:14.40 | |
| 5 | 3 | Andrew Bree | Northern Ireland | 2:14.48 | |
| 6 | 8 | Ian Edmond | Scotland | 2:14.56 | |
| 7 | 6 | Regan Harrison | Australia | 2:15.86 | |
| 8 | 1 | Morgan Knabe | Canada | 2:16.73 | |
