= Swimming at the 2002 Commonwealth Games – Women's EAD 100 metre freestyle =

Women's EAD 100 metre freestyle at the 2002 Commonwealth Games
- Venue: Manchester Aquatics Centre
- Dates: 2 August
- Competitors: 15 from 10 nations
- Winning time: -2.30

Medalists
gold medal	Natalie du Toit	South Africa
silver medal	Stéphanie Dixon	Canada
bronze medal	Kirby Cote	Canada

The Women's EAD 100 metre freestyle event at the 2002 Commonwealth Games was held on 2 August at the Manchester Aquatics Centre.

== Classification ==
The events were run on a multi-disability format, which included both physically disabled and visually impaired swimmers i.e. the International Paralympic Committee’s Swimming Classification S1 – S13.

- Classes S1 – S10 are allocated to swimmers with a physical disability ranging from swimmers with a severe disability (S1) to those with a minimal disability (S10).
- Classes S11 – S13 are allocated to swimmers with a visual impairment ranging from swimmers with no vision or may have light perception (S11) to those with some visual acuity (S13).

== Format ==
All classes, 1 through 13 swan together in 2 heats and a final event. Positions were determined by each athlete’s time relative to the current world record for the appropriate classification of the swimmer. This may have meant that the swimmer touching first may not have been the winner.

World records were time standardised to identify both the finalists and medal winners throughout the competition. This meant that the same ‘time marker’ was used in the heats and the final irrespective of whether the world record had been broken during the course of competition.

== Records ==
Prior to this competition, the existing world records were as follows;

Class	Name	Time	Location	Date
S1	Danielle Watts (ENG)	3:16.64	Stockholm, Sweden	5 August 2001
S2	Mairead Berry (IRL)	2:43.67	Sydney, Australia	26 October 2000
S3	Patricia Valle (MEX)	2:03.94	Sydney, Australia	26 October 2000
S4	Mayumi Narita (JPN)	1:30.06	Sydney, Australia	26 October 2000
S5	Béatrice Hess (FRA)	1:18.99	Sydney, Australia	26 October 2000
S6	Erin Popovich (USA)	1:19.72	Sydney, Australia	26 October 2000
S7	Danielle Campo (CAN)	1:14.64	Sydney, Australia	25 October 2000
S8	Keren Leibovitch (ISR)	1:10.25	Sydney, Australia	25 October 2000
S9		1:05.13		
S10	Jessica Sloan (CAN)	1:01.67	Sydney, Australia	25 October 2000
S11	Yvette Michel (CAN)	1:11.52	New York City, United States	16 June 1984
S12	Hongyan Zhu (CHN)	1:00.01	Madrid, Spain	23 July 1998
S13	Yvonne Hopf (GER)	59.88	Atlanta, United States	21 August 1996

The following records were established during the competition:

Date	Event	Class	Name	Nationality	Time	Result	Record
2 August	Heats	S5	Theresa Goh	Singapore	1:48.70	+29.71	GR
2 August	Heats	S7	Liz Johnson	Wales	1:38.56	+23.92	GR
2 August	Heats	S8	Matia Baun Seling	Malaysia	2:11.78	+1:01.53	GR
2 August	Heats	S9	Stéphanie Dixon	Canada	1:07.53	+2.40	GR
2 August	Heats	S9	Natalie du Toit	South Africa	1:02.83	-2.30	WR
2 August	Heats	S10	Sarah Bailey	England	1:07.01	+5.34	GR
2 August	Final	S10	Sarah Bailey	England	1:06.98	+5.31	GR
2 August	Heats	S11	Elaine Barrett	England	1:15.64	+4.12	GR
2 August	Heats	S13	Rhiannon Henry	Wales	1:05.35	+5.47	GR
2 August	Heats	S13	Kirby Cote	Canada	1:02.22	+2.34	GR
2 August	Final	S13	Kirby Cote	Canada	1:01.76	+1.88	GR

== Results ==
=== Heats ===
The 8 fastest swimmers in the heats qualified for the semifinals.

Rank	Heat	Lane	Name	Class	Nationality	Time	Result	Notes
1	2	5	Natalie du Toit	S9	South Africa	1:02.83	-2.30	Q, WR
2	2	4	Kirby Cote	S13	Canada	1:02.22	+2.34	Q, GR
3	1	5	Stéphanie Dixon	S9	Canada	1:07.53	+2.40	Q, GR
4	2	6	Dianna Ley	S9	Australia	1:07.75	+2.62	Q
5	1	2	Elaine Barrett	S11	England	1:15.64	+4.12	Q, GR
6	1	2	Lara Ferguson	S9	Scotland	1:09.87	+4.74	Q
7	2	3	Sarah Bailey	S10	England	1:07.01	+5.34	Q, GR
8	1	3	Rhiannon Henry	S13	Wales	1:05.35	+5.47	Q, GR
9	1	6	Kate Bailey	S9	Australia	1:10.79	+5.66	Q
10	1	4	Karolina Pelendritou	S13	Cyprus	1:06.44	+6.56	Q
11	2	7	Liz Johnson	S7	Wales	1:38.56	+23.92	Q, GR
12	1	4	Theresa Goh	S5	Singapore	1:48.70	+29.71	Q, GR
13	2	1	Catherine Timpang Siang	S9	Malaysia	1:44.69	+39.56	Q
14	1	1	Matia Baun Seling	S8	Malaysia	2:11.78	+1:01.53	Q, GR
15	2	8	Janet Nduu	S9	Kenya	2:22.91	+1:19.78	Q

=== Final ===
The final was held on 3 August at 20:25.

Rank	Lane	Name	Class	Nation	Time	Result	Notes
1st place, gold medalist(s)	4	Natalie du Toit	S9	South Africa	1:02.93	-2.20	
2nd place, silver medalist(s)	5	Stéphanie Dixon	S9	Canada	1:05.05	-0.08	
3rd place, bronze medalist(s)	3	Kirby Cote	S13	Canada	1:01.76	+1.88	GR
4	6	Dianna Ley	S9	Australia	1:07.54	+2.41	
5	2	Elaine Barrett	S11	England	1:16.26	+4.74	
6	7	Lara Ferguson	S9	Scotland	1:10.17	+5.04	
7	1	Sarah Bailey	S10	England	1:06.98	+5.31	GR
8	8	Rhiannon Henry	S13	Wales	1:06.13	+6.25	
