= Athletics at the 2002 Commonwealth Games – Women's marathon =

Women's marathon at the Commonwealth Games

The women's marathon event at the 2002 Commonwealth Games was held on 28 July.

== Results ==
Rank	Name	Nationality	Time	Notes
1st place, gold medalist(s)	Kerryn McCann	Australia	2:30:05	
2nd place, silver medalist(s)	Krishna Stanton	Australia	2:34:52	PB
3rd place, bronze medalist(s)	Jackie Gallagher	Australia	2:36:37	
4	Debbie Robinson	England	2:39:42	
5	Teresa McCluskey	Northern Ireland	2:40:29	SB
6	Bev Hartigan	England	2:41:27	
7	Carol Galea	Malta	2:45:48	
8	Marian Sutton	England	2:45:55	
9	Beata Naigambo	Namibia	2:47:22	SB
10	Elizabeth Mongudhi	Namibia	2:49:19	
11	Matsepo Angelina Sephooa	Lesotho	2:52:06	
12	Penny Buckingham	Guernsey	2:58:40	NR
13	Mpho Kholobeng	Lesotho	3:16:36	SB
	Esther Maina Wanjiru	Kenya	DNF	
	Mamokete Lechela	Lesotho	DNF	
