= Karen Legg =

English swimmer (born 1978)

Personal information
- Full name: Karen Legg
- National team: Great Britain
- Born: 3 June 1978 (age 48) Poole, England
- Height: 1.63 m (5 ft 4 in)
- Weight: 59 kg (130 lb; 9.3 st)

Sport
- Sport: Swimming
- Strokes: Freestyle
- Club: Ferndown Otters
Medal record
Event	1st	2nd	3rd
World Championships (LC)	1	0	0
World Championships (SC)	1	1	1
European Championships (SC)	0	0	2
Commonwealth Games	1	4	2
Total	3	5	5
Women's swimming
Representing Great Britain
World Championships (LC)
Gold medal – first place	2001 Fukuoka	4×200 m freestyle
World Championships (SC)
Gold medal – first place	2000 Athens	4×200 m freestyle
Silver medal – second place	2000 Athens	4×100 m freestyle
Bronze medal – third place	1999 Hong Kong	4×200 m freestyle
European Championships (SC)
Bronze medal – third place	1998 Sheffield	400 m freestyle
Bronze medal – third place	2000 Valencia	200 m freestyle
Representing England
Commonwealth Games
Gold medal – first place	2002 Manchester	4×200 m freestyle
Silver medal – second place	1998 Kuala Lumpur	4×100 m freestyle
Silver medal – second place	1998 Kuala Lumpur	4×200 m freestyle
Silver medal – second place	2002 Manchester	200 m freestyle
Silver medal – second place	2002 Manchester	4×100 m freestyle
Bronze medal – third place	2002 Manchester	100 m freestyle
Bronze medal – third place	2002 Manchester	4×200 m medley

Karen Legg (born 3 June 1978), also known by her married name Karen Crumpler, is an English former freestyle swimmer.

== Swimming career ==
She competed for Great Britain in the Olympics, FINA world championships and European championships, and swam for England in the Commonwealth Games. During her seven-year international career (1998–2005), she won four world, two European and seven Commonwealth medals. Legg also competed for Great Britain in the 2000 Summer Olympic Games in Sydney in the women's 4×200-metre freestyle relay.

She represented England and won two silver medals in the relay events, at the 1998 Commonwealth Games in Kuala Lumpur, Malaysia. Four years later she won five more medals, three in the relay events (including a gold medal) and two in the individual events.

She won the 2001 British Championship in the 200 metres freestyle and the 400 metres freestyle.

== See also ==
- List of Commonwealth Games medallists in swimming (women)
- World record progression 4 × 200 metres freestyle relay
