= Total Swimming =

Total Swimming is a company based in the United Kingdom that specialises in the delivery of swimming at grassroots level. It was set up in 2005 by Olympic swimmers Steve Parry and Adrian Turner.

Total Swimming is most well known for the Pools 4 Schools programme, an initiative that takes temporary swimming pools across England to teach primary school children to swim, which is run with the Amateur Swimming Association. The programme has achieved widespread media attention, including features on BBC TV and radio, plus ITV regional news. In July 2010, Pools 4 Schools celebrated teaching its 10,000th child to swim with a ceremony attended by Olympic swimmer and television personality Mark Foster.

Total Swimming also runs swimming academies and holds events for swimming clubs.
