= Swimming at the 2002 Commonwealth Games – Women's 50 metre breaststroke =

Women's 50 metres breaststroke at the 2002 Commonwealth Games
- Venue: Manchester Aquatics Centre
- Dates: 30–31 July 2002
- Competitors: 17 from 12 nations
- Winning time: 30.60

Medalists
gold medal	Zoe Baker	England
silver medal	Sarah Poewe	South Africa
bronze medal	Tarnee White	Australia

The women's 50 metre breaststroke event at the 2002 Commonwealth Games was held on 30 to 31 July at the Manchester Aquatics Centre.

== Results ==
=== Heats ===
Rank	Heat	Lane	Name	Nationality	Time	Notes
1	3	4	Zoe Baker	England	31.03	Q
2	2	5	Tarnee White	Australia	31.74	Q
3	3	3	Emma Robinson	Northern Ireland	32.02	Q
4	2	4	Leisel Jones	Australia	32.32	Q
4	3	5	Sarah Katsoulis	Australia	32.32	Q
6	1	5	Rhiannon Leier	Canada	32.39	Q
7	1	4	Sarah Poewe	South Africa	32.57	Q
8	2	3	Kate Haywood	England	32.61	Q
9	1	3	Kirsty Balfour	Scotland	32.76	Q
10	3	6	Georgia Holderness	Wales	34.15	Q
11	2	6	Lowri Tynan	Wales	34.19	Q
12	1	2	Siow Yi Ting	Malaysia	34.40	Q
13	1	6	Annamay Pierse	Canada	34.42	Q
14	2	2	Rachel Ah Koy	Fiji	34.99	Q
15	3	7	Gail Strobridge	Guernsey	36.38	Q
-	2	7	Olivia Aya Nakitanda	Uganda	DNS	
-	3	2	Karolina Pelendritou	Cyprus	DNS	

=== Semifinals ===
Rank	Heat	Lane	Name	Nationality	Time	Notes
1	2	4	Zoe Baker	England	30.57	Q, WR
2	1	5	Leisel Jones	Australia	31.99	Q
3	1	4	Tarnee White	Australia	32.04	Q
4	1	3	Rhiannon Leier	Canada	32.11	Q
5	2	5	Emma Robinson	Northern Ireland	32.26	Q
6	2	6	Sarah Poewe	South Africa	32.52	Q
7	2	3	Sarah Katsoulis	Australia	32.54	Q
8	1	6	Kate Haywood	England	32.64	Q
9	2	2	Kirsty Balfour	Scotland	32.83	
10	1	2	Georgia Holderness	Wales	33.44	
11	2	7	Lowri Tynan	Wales	33.74	
12	2	1	Annamay Pierse	Canada	34.14	
13	1	7	Siow Yi Ting	Malaysia	34.45	
14	1	1	Rachel Ah Koy	Fiji	34.98	
15	2	8	Gail Strobridge	Guernsey	35.61	

=== Final ===
Rank	Lane	Name	Nationality	Time	Notes
1st place, gold medalist(s)	4	Zoe Baker	England	30.60	
2nd place, silver medalist(s)	7	Sarah Poewe	South Africa	31.73	
3rd place, bronze medalist(s)	3	Tarnee White	Australia	31.74	
4	5	Leisel Jones	Australia	32.01	
5	6	Rhiannon Leier	Canada	32.28	
6	2	Emma Robinson	Northern Ireland	32.41	
7	8	Kate Haywood	England	32.57	
8	1	Sarah Katsoulis	Australia	32.86	
