= Swimming at the 2002 Commonwealth Games – Men's 200 metre backstroke =

Men's 200 metre backstroke at the 2002 Commonwealth Games
- Venue: Manchester Aquatics Centre
- Dates: 1 August 2002
- Competitors: 17 from 11 nations
- Winning time: 1:59.83

Medalists
gold medal	James Goddard	England
silver medal	Gregor Tait	Scotland
bronze medal	Simon Militis	England

The men's 200 metre backstroke event at the 2002 Commonwealth Games was held on 1 August at the Manchester Aquatics Centre.

== Results ==
=== Heats ===
Rank	Heat	Lane	Name	Nationality	Time	Notes
1	3	3	Keith Beavers	Canada	2:01.22	Q
2	2	4	Gregor Tait	Scotland	2:01.51	Q
3	1	4	Simon Militis	England	2:02.46	Q
4	2	5	Leigh McBean	Australia	2:02.54	Q
5	3	5	James Goddard	England	2:02.62	Q
6	1	3	Ethan Rolff	Australia	2:02.63	Q
7	1	5	Cameron Gibson	New Zealand	2:02.76	Q
8	2	6	Carlos Sayao	Canada	2:02.94	Q
9	2	3	Tobias Oriwol	Canada	2:04.24	
10	3	6	Alex Lim	Malaysia	2:04.40	
11	1	6	Nicholas Neckles	Barbados	2:05.58	
12	1	2	Dane Harrop	Isle of Man	2:09.32	
13	3	2	Ian Powell	Guernsey	2:09.49	
14	2	2	Andrew Mackay	Cayman Islands	2:09.71	
15	3	7	Jonathon Le Noury	Guernsey	2:13.30	
16	2	7	Kabir Walia	Kenya	2:29.07	
-	3	4	Matt Welsh	Australia	DQ	

=== Final ===
Rank	Lane	Name	Nationality	Time	Notes
1st place, gold medalist(s)	2	James Goddard	England	1:59.83	
2nd place, silver medalist(s)	5	Gregor Tait	Scotland	2:00.55	
3rd place, bronze medalist(s)	3	Simon Militis	England	2:01.04	
4	6	Leigh McBean	Australia	2:01.22	
5	7	Ethan Rolff	Australia	2:01.65	
6	1	Cameron Gibson	New Zealand	2:02.00	
7	8	Carlos Sayao	Canada	2:03.05	
8	4	Keith Beavers	Canada	2:03.29	
