= Samuel Wieland =

Australian sports shooter (born 1977)

Olympic medal record

Men's shooting
Gold medal – first place	2002 Manchester	50m Rifle 3 Position Pair
Bronze medal – third place	2002 Manchester	50m Rifle 3 Position

Samuel Wieland (born 25 July 1977 in Melbourne) is an Australian sport shooter. He tied for 22nd place in the men's 50 metre rifle three positions event at the 2000 Summer Olympics.
