= Athletics at the 2002 Commonwealth Games – Men's 20 kilometres walk =

Men's 20 kilometres walk at the Commonwealth Games

The men's 20 kilometres walk event at the 2002 Commonwealth Games was held on 28 July.

== Results ==
| Rank | Name | Nationality | Time | Notes |
|---|---|---|---|---|
| 1st place, gold medalist(s) | Nathan Deakes | Australia | 1:25:35 | |
| 2nd place, silver medalist(s) | Luke Adams | Australia | 1:26:03 | |
| 3rd place, bronze medalist(s) | David Kimutai | Kenya | 1:28:20 | |
| 4 | Andrew Penn | England | 1:29:15 | |
| 5 | Don Bearman | England | 1:37:29 | |
| | Dominic King | England | DQ | |
| | Steve Partington | Isle of Man | DQ | |
