= Eloise Southby-Halbish =

Australian netball player (born 1976)

Personal information
- Born: 6 July 1976 (age 50)
- Height: 187 cm (6 ft 1 1/2 in)
- Relative: Geoff Southby (father)
- School: Ave Maria College

Netball career
- Playing positions: GS, GA
Years	Club team	Apps
1997–2005	Melbourne Phoenix	132
Years	National team	Caps
1998, 2000–06	Australia	34
Medal record
Representing Australia
Netball World Championships
Silver medal – second place	2003 Kingston	Netball
Commonwealth Games
Gold medal – first place	2002 Manchester	Netball
- Updated on 2009-03-29

Eloise Southby-Halbish (born 6 July 1976) is an Australian sports commentator and former netball player. She was co-captain of the Melbourne Phoenix with fellow goaler, Sharelle McMahon, and also played for the Australia national netball team.

== Netball career ==
Southby-Halbish appeared in 132 Commonwealth Bank Trophy matches for the Phoenix and represented Australia in 34 Tests in the positions goal shooter and goal attack.

Identified early in her career as a highly talented shooting prospect, Southby-Halbish made her international debut in early 1998, at the age of 21. Southby-Halbish's arrival on the international scene coincided with a period where Australia was rich in shooting talent – with the likes of Vicki Wilson, Nicole Cusack, and Jennifer Borlase all laying claim to the main shooting positions. This overflow of talent saw Southby-Halbish overlooked for the 1998 Commonwealth Games and 1999 Netball World Championships, however she was recalled to the team in 2000.

Southby-Halbish was renowned for her accuracy, strength, and netballing acumen. Her combination with international-level shooter Sharelle McMahon was one of the most successful shooting combinations, with Southby-Halbish's vision and timing complementing McMahon's speed and athleticism.

Southby-Halbish's career received a blow when she was forced to withdraw from the squad to represent Australia at the 2006 Commonwealth Games with a recurring ankle injury. She subsequently retired just before the start of the interstate home and away season, after playing a starring role in Melbourne Phoenix's comprehensive premiership in 2005.

Southby-Halbish won five premierships with Melbourne Phoenix, a Commonwealth Games gold medal in 2002, and a World Championships silver medal in 2003.

== Media commentator ==
Following her retirement, Southby-Halbish became a commentator with ABC Sports, calling Commonwealth Bank Trophy matches and international tests. Southby-Halbish co-wrote a novel Anna Flowers with a netball theme. Southby-Halbish moved to Fox Sports as commentator for the new ANZ Championship competition in 2008.

== Personal life ==
Eloise Southby-Halbish is the daughter of Carlton premiership player Geoff Southby and occasionally appeared on Fox Footy's Living With Footballers.
