= Joanna Fargus =

British-Australian swimmer

Personal information
- Full name: Joanna Lindsay Fargus
- Nickname: "Jo"
- National team: Great Britain; Australia
- Born: 3 January 1982 (age 44) Hong Kong
- Height: 1.76 m (5 ft 9 in)
- Weight: 62 kg (137 lb; 9.8 st)

Sport
- Sport: Swimming
- Strokes: Backstroke, freestyle
- College team: University of Southern California
Medal record
Women's swimming
Representing Great Britain
World Championships (LC)
Bronze medal – third place	2001 Fukuoka	200 m backstroke
European Championships (SC)
Gold medal – first place	2000 Valencia	200 m backstroke
Commonwealth Games
Representing England
Gold medal – first place	2002 Manchester	4×200 m freestyle
Silver medal – second place	2002 Manchester	200 m backstroke
Representing Australia
Gold medal – first place	2006 Melbourne	200 m backstroke

Joanna Lindsay Fargus (born 3 January 1982) is a British-Australian former swimmer who specialised in the 200-metre backstroke. In this event she won a gold medal at the 2006 Commonwealth Games in Melbourne, and at the European Short Course Swimming Championships 2000 and a bronze medal at the 2001 World Aquatics Championships; she finished ninth at the 2000 Summer Olympics. She also competed in freestyle, winning a gold medal in the 4×200-metre relay at the 2002 Commonwealth Games.

== Biography ==
Fargus was born in Hong Kong to a Scottish father and Australian mother and therefore holds dual British-Australian citizenship. After spending 10 years in Hong Kong, she moved to the UK for boarding school (Millfield) for five years before transferring to Australia where she completed high school at Somerset College in Mudgeeraba, Queensland. She then moved back to England, where she swam full-time at the University of Bath. In 2002, she enrolled at the University of Southern California (USC) on a full athletic scholarship and until 2006 competed and worked as a volunteer coach in the United States. She was voted USC Woman of the Year 2005 and graduated cum laude with a bachelor's degree in communication. All those years she represented England and Great Britain at international competitions, after which she transferred her sporting allegiance to swim for Australia. From January 2006 to March 2008 she competed for Australia, winning the 200 m backstroke event at the 2006 Commonwealth Games. An Australian postal stamp featuring her has been issued on this occasion.

Around March 2008 she retired from swimming and moved back to Hong Kong, where she first worked as an account executive at PPR Greater China and then as media relations manager at HSBC.

Her brother Andrew competed for Scotland in triathlon at the 2002 Commonwealth Games.

== See also ==
- List of World Aquatics Championships medalists in swimming (women)
