= Heath Ramsay =

Australian swimmer

Personal information
- Full name: Heath Terrence Ramsay
- Nickname: Rambo
- National team: Australia
- Born: 3 April 1981 (age 45) Ipswich, Queensland
- Height: 1.88 m (6 ft 2 in)
- Weight: 76 kg (168 lb)

Sport
- Sport: Swimming
- Strokes: Butterfly
- Club: Railway Swim Club

Heath Terrence Ramsay (born 3 April 1981) is a former butterfly swimmer who competed for Australia at the 2000 Summer Olympics in Sydney, Australia. There he finished in eleventh position in the 200-metre butterfly, clocking 1:57.90 minutes in the B-Final.

== Early life ==
Ramsay was born in 1981 in Ipswich, Queensland. After finishing at St Edmund's College, Ipswich, he went to the University of Queensland.

== Olympic career ==
In the lead-up to the 2000 Summer Olympics, he paused his commerce degree to focus on swimming. Ramsay qualified for the 2000 Olympics by winning the 200-metre butterfly at the Australian championships.

== Post-Olympic career ==
Retiring from swimming in 2003, Heath founded a successful learn to swim centre in Ipswich. He was a coach to his daughter Ella Ramsay who was a swimmer in Australia's team at the 2024 Olympics.
