= Elka Graham =

Australian swimmer

Personal information
- Full name: Elka Graham
- National team: Australia
- Born: 20 October 1981 (age 44) Sydney
- Height: 1.87 m (6 ft 2 in)
- Weight: 67 kg (148 lb)

Sport
- Sport: Swimming
- Strokes: Freestyle
Medal record
Women's swimming
Representing Australia
Olympic Games
Silver medal – second place	2000 Sydney	4×200 m free
World Championships (LC)
Silver medal – second place	2003 Barcelona	4×200 m free
Bronze medal – third place	2003 Barcelona	4×100 m free
SC Worlds
Silver medal – second place	2002 Moscow	4×100 m free
Bronze medal – third place	2002 Moscow	4×200 m free
Pan Pacific Championships
Silver medal – second place	2002 Yokohama	200 m freestyle
Silver medal – second place	2002 Yokohama	4×200 m free
Commonwealth Games
Silver medal – second place	2002 Manchester	4×200 m free
Bronze medal – third place	2002 Manchester	200 m freestyle

Elka Graham (born 20 October 1981), now known by her married name Elka Whalan, is an Australian former competition swimmer who swam in the 2000 Sydney Olympics and 2004 Athens Olympics. Graham specialised in the 200-metre and 400-metre freestyle events, also swimming the 800-metre freestyle. She represented Australia at numerous international meets, including the Pan Pacific Championships, World Swimming Championships in 2001 and 2003, and the 2002 Commonwealth Games.

She was a member of Australia's 4×200-metre freestyle relay team that finished first at the 2001 World Championships in Fukuoka, only to be disqualified when she and the rest of the relay team jumped into the pool to celebrate before all the other teams in the final had finished.

In 2007, she claimed that she was offered performance-enhancing drugs from another member of the Australian swimming team before the 2004 Athens Olympic Games, but refused to name the person.

Graham retired from swimming in May 2006 and is now involved in the media, modelling and corporate speaking. She is married to athlete Thomas Whalan and has four kids.

== See also ==
- List of Olympic medalists in swimming (women)
