= Helene Muller =

South African swimmer (born 1978)

Personal information
- Full name: Karina Helene Muller
- National team: South Africa
- Born: 25 April 1978 (age 48) Pretoria, South Africa
- Height: 1.75 m (5 ft 9 in)
- Weight: 72 kg (159 lb)

Sport
- Sport: Swimming
- Strokes: Freestyle
- College team: University of Nebraska–Lincoln (US)
- Coach: Cal Bentz (US)
Medal record
Women's swimming
Representing South Africa
Commonwealth Games
Silver medal – second place	2002 Manchester	100 m freestyle
Silver medal – second place	2002 Manchester	4×100 m medley

Karina Helene Muller (also Helene Muller; born 25 April 1978) is a South African former swimmer, who specialised in sprint and middle-distance freestyle events. She represented South Africa in two editions of the Olympic Games (1996 and 2000), and later captured two silver medals each in sprint freestyle and medley relay at the 2002 Commonwealth Games.

While studying in the United States, Muller swam for the Nebraska Cornhuskers swimming and diving team, under head coach Cal Bentz, and Sprint coach Keith Moore, at the University of Nebraska–Lincoln. She also received thirteen All-American honours, and earned a bronze medal in the 200-yard freestyle (1:46.97) at the 2000 NCAA Women's Swimming and Diving Championships in Indianapolis, Indiana.

Muller made her first South African Olympic team, as an eighteen-year-old junior, at the 1996 Summer Olympics in Atlanta. There, she failed to reach the top 16 final in any of her individual events, finishing thirty-third in the 100 m freestyle (57.98), and thirtieth in the 200 m freestyle (2:05.59). In the 4 × 100 m medley relay, Muller, along with Marianne Kriel, Penny Heyns, and Mandy Loots, finished fourth with a time of 4:08.16, almost a full second off the podium.

At the 2000 Summer Olympics in Sydney, Muller competed in four swimming events. She achieved FINA A-standards of 25.94 (50 m freestyle), 55.82 (100 m freestyle), and 2:00.35 (200 m freestyle) from the South African Nationals in Johannesburg. In her first event, 200 m freestyle, Muller finished her semi-final run with a ninth-seeded time of 2:00.04. Earlier in the prelims, she posted a second-fastest time and a South African record of 1:59.89. Three days later, in the 100 m freestyle, Muller finished sixth in the final with a sterling African record of 55.19. In the 50 m freestyle, Muller posted a time of 26.07 from heat nine, but missed the semi-finals by 11-hundredths of a second. On the last day of the program, Muller teamed up again with Loots, Sarah Poewe, and Charlene Wittstock in the 4 × 100 m medley relay. Swimming a freestyle leg, Muller anchored the race with a split of 54.77, a new national record, but the South Africans settled only for fifth place in a final time of 4:05.15.

At the 2002 Commonwealth Games in Manchester, England, Muller captured two silver medals each in the 100 m freestyle (55.60), and in the 4 × 100 m medley relay (4:05.06), along with Loots, Poewe, and Wittstock.
