= Petria Thomas =

Australian swimmer (born 1975)

Petria Thomas OAM
Personal information
- Full name: Petria Ann Thomas
- National team: Australia
- Born: 25 August 1975 (age 51) Lismore, New South Wales
- Height: 173 cm (5 ft 8 in)
- Weight: 64 kg (141 lb)

Sport
- Sport: Swimming
- Strokes: Freestyle, butterfly
- Club: Ginninderra Swim Club
Medal record
Women's swimming
Representing Australia
Event	1st	2nd	3rd
Olympic Games	3	4	1
World Championships (LC)	3	2	2
World Championships (SC)	1	6	2
Pan Pacific Championships	3	3	1
Commonwealth Games	9	2	1
Total	19	17	7
Olympic Games
Gold medal – first place	2004 Athens	100 m butterfly
Gold medal – first place	2004 Athens	4×100 m freestyle
Gold medal – first place	2004 Athens	4×100 m medley
Silver medal – second place	1996 Atlanta	200 m butterfly
Silver medal – second place	2000 Sydney	4×200 m freestyle
Silver medal – second place	2000 Sydney	4×100 m medley
Silver medal – second place	2004 Athens	200 m butterfly
Bronze medal – third place	2000 Sydney	200 m butterfly
World Championships (LC)
Gold medal – first place	2001 Fukuoka	100 m butterfly
Gold medal – first place	2001 Fukuoka	200 m butterfly
Gold medal – first place	2001 Fukuoka	4×100 m medley
Silver medal – second place	1998 Perth	200 m butterfly
Silver medal – second place	1998 Perth	4×100 m medley
Bronze medal – third place	1998 Perth	100 m butterfly
Bronze medal – third place	1998 Perth	4×200 m freestyle
World Championships (SC)
Gold medal – first place	2002 Moscow	200 m butterfly
Silver medal – second place	1993 Mallorca	4×100 m medley
Silver medal – second place	1999 Hong Kong	200 m butterfly
Silver medal – second place	1999 Hong Kong	4×100 m medley
Silver medal – second place	2002 Moscow	50 m butterfly
Silver medal – second place	2002 Moscow	100 m butterfly
Silver medal – second place	2002 Moscow	4×100 m freestyle
Bronze medal – third place	1993 Mallorca	200 m butterfly
Bronze medal – third place	2002 Moscow	4×200 m freestyle
Pan Pacific Championships
Gold medal – first place	2002 Yokohama	200 m butterfly
Gold medal – first place	2002 Yokohama	4×100 m freestyle
Gold medal – first place	2002 Yokohama	4×100 m medley
Silver medal – second place	1993 Kobe	4×100 m medley
Silver medal – second place	2002 Yokohama	100 m butterfly
Silver medal – second place	2002 Yokohama	4×200 m freestyle
Bronze medal – third place	1993 Kobe	100 m butterfly
Commonwealth Games
Gold medal – first place	1994 Victoria	100 m butterfly
Gold medal – first place	1994 Victoria	4×100 m medley
Gold medal – first place	1998 Kuala Lumpur	100 m butterfly
Gold medal – first place	1998 Kuala Lumpur	4×100 m medley
Gold medal – first place	2002 Manchester	50 m butterfly
Gold medal – first place	2002 Manchester	100 m butterfly
Gold medal – first place	2002 Manchester	200 m butterfly
Gold medal – first place	2002 Manchester	4×100 m freestyle
Gold medal – first place	2002 Manchester	4×100 m medley
Silver medal – second place	1998 Kuala Lumpur	200 m butterfly
Silver medal – second place	2002 Manchester	4×200 m freestyle
Bronze medal – third place	2002 Manchester	200 m freestyle

Petria Ann Thomas, OAM (born 25 August 1975) is an Australian swimmer and Olympic gold medallist and a winner of 15 national titles. She was born in Lismore, New South Wales, and grew up in the nearby town of Mullumbimby, where she has a community pool named in her honour.

== Career ==
In 1993, at the age of 17, Thomas won a bronze medal in the 200-metre butterfly at the World Short Course Championships. She followed this with two gold medals, in the 100-metre butterfly and 4×100-metre freestyle in the 1994 Commonwealth Games in Victoria, Canada. However, she then struggled for two years, until making a comeback at the 1996 Summer Olympics in Atlanta in 1996. She won a silver medal, finishing second to fellow Australian Susie O'Neill.

Despite being plagued by a shoulder injury, Thomas repeated her 1994 Commonwealth Games effort at the 1998 Games in Kuala Lumpur. She also won a bronze in the 100-metre butterfly and a silver in the 200-metre at the World Championships in Perth, the same year. She had similar success at the 2000 Summer Olympics in Sydney in 2000, winning three medals – bronze in the 200-metre butterfly, silver in the 4×100-metre medley, and silver in the 4×200-metre freestyle.

Thomas had always struggled to surpass O'Neill, despite being talented in her own right. However, after the 2000 games, O'Neill retired, and Thomas, despite battling recurring injuries, decided to continue. The decision paid off when she won three gold medals at the 2001 World Championships in Fukuoka, Japan. She won both the 100-metre and 200-metre butterfly, and then was part of the winning 4×100-metre medley relay team. She was also part of the 4×200-metre freestyle relay team, which completed the race first, but they were disqualified when Thomas jumped in the pool to celebrate before the other competitors had completed the race.

At the 2002 Commonwealth Games, Thomas won five gold, one silver and one bronze medals. While being one of the pinnacles of her career, her victory also made her the first female swimmer ever to win the same event at three consecutive Commonwealth Games – the 100-metre butterfly. She followed this with three gold and two silver medals at the 2002 Pan Pacific Swimming Championships in Yokohama, Japan. At the short-course championships in Moscow, Russia, Thomas won another gold medal in her pet event, the 200-metre butterfly. However, injuries forced her out of competition soon afterwards, and she had to spend much of 2003 recovering from yet another shoulder reconstruction.

In 2004, Thomas made another comeback at the Olympic selection trials in Sydney while training with the Ginninderra Swimming Club. She broke the Commonwealth records in the 50-metre and 100-metre butterfly, set new personal best times in the 100-metre freestyle, 200-metre freestyle and narrowly missed the world record in the 200-metre butterfly.

After having missed out on first place in 1996 and 2000, Thomas finally achieved gold at the 2004 Summer Olympics in Athens. She won the individual 100-metre butterfly, and was a part of two world record-setting teams in the 4×100-metre freestyle and 4×100-metre medley relays. She was subsequently chosen to carry the Australian flag at the closing ceremony. Thomas announced her retirement from competitive swimming at the conclusion of the games.

In mid-2005, Thomas released an autobiography, Swimming Against The Tide, in which she describes her career, including her experiences with depression and injuries.

She currently resides in Amaroo, Canberra, with her husband, Julian Jones, the head strength and conditioning coach at the AIS. They have two children. Thomas manages the Swimming Australia National Training Centre at the AIS.

She served as Chef de Mission of the Australian team at the 2022 Commonwealth Games held in Birmingham, England.

== Recognition ==
- 1996 – Australian Institute of Sport Swimming Hall of Fame inductee
- 2001 – AIS Athlete of the Year (with gymnast Philippe Rizzo)
- 2002 – AIS Athlete of the Year
- 2006 – AIS 'Best of the Best' inductee
- 2007 – Sport Australia Hall of Fame inductee
- 2022 – University of Canberra Sport Walk of Fame inaugural inductee
- 2022 – Australian Institute of Sport Leadership Award

== See also ==
- List of Olympic medalists in swimming (women)
- List of Commonwealth Games medallists in swimming (women)
- List of multiple Summer Olympic medalists
- World record progression 4 × 100 metres freestyle relay
- World record progression 4 × 100 metres medley relay

Awards
Preceded by Susie O'Neill	Swimming World Pacific Rim; Swimmer of the Year; 2001–2002	Succeeded by Leisel Jones
