= Krishna Stanton =

Australian long-distance runner

Personal information
- Born: 18 May 1966 (age 60) Leeton, New South Wales, Australia

Sport
- Sport: Track and field
Medal record
Representing Australia
Commonwealth Games
Silver medal – second place	2002 Manchester	Marathon

Krishna Lee Stanton (née Wood; born 18 May 1966) is an Australian distance runner. She finished fourth in the 3000 metres at the 1987 IAAF World Indoor Championships and went on to win the silver medal in the marathon at the 2002 Commonwealth Games. She also competed at the 1992 Barcelona Olympics. A four-time Australian champion, she won the 3000 metres title in 1990 and 1993, the 15 km in 1990 and the marathon in 2001. In October 2022 Krishna broke the existing world record time for a Marathon in the women's 55 age group at the London Marathon. Krishna was the second woman to finish in the Sydney Half-Marathon in September 2023 in a time of 1:21:17.

== International competitions ==
Year	Competition	Venue	Position	Event	Notes
Representing Australia
1987	World Indoor Championships	Indianapolis, United States	4th	3000 m	8:48.38
1987	World Cross Country Championships	Warsaw, Poland	8th	5.1 km	17:11
1991	World Cross Country Championships	Antwerp, Belgium	87th	6.4 km	22:15
1992	World Cross Country Championships	Boston, United States	77th	6.4 km	22:50
1992	Olympic Games	Barcelona, Spain	22nd (h)	3000 m	9:00.62
1994	Commonwealth Games	Victoria, Canada	11th	10,000 m	33:11.44
2002	Commonwealth Games	Manchester, England	2nd	Marathon	2:34:52
2022	London Marathon	London, England	1st	Marathon	2:48:06
(h) Indicates overall position in qualifying heats
