= Maria Papadopoulou =

Cypriot swimmer (born 1980)

Personal information
- Full name: Maria Papadopoulou
- National team: Cyprus
- Born: 8 September 1980 (age 45) Limassol, Cyprus
- Height: 1.60 m (5 ft 3 in)
- Weight: 53 kg (117 lb)

Sport
- Sport: Swimming
- Strokes: Butterfly
- College team: University of Arizona (U.S.)
Medal record
Women's swimming
Representing Cyprus
Mediterranean Games
Bronze medal – third place	2001 Tunis	100 m butterfly

Maria Papadopoulou (Greek: Μαρία Παπαδοπούλου; born September 8, 1980) is a Cypriot former swimmer who specialized in butterfly events. She set a Cypriot record of 1:01.67 to earn a bronze medal in the 100 m butterfly at the 2001 Mediterranean Games in Tunis, Tunisia.

Papadopoulou made her first Cypriot team at the 2000 Summer Olympics in Sydney, where she competed in the women's 100 m butterfly, held on the first day of preliminaries. She broke a 1:02 barrier to top the third heat with a time of 1:01.64, but finished only in thirty-second place.

At the 2004 Summer Olympics in Athens, Papadopoulou qualified again for the women's 100 m butterfly by eclipsing a FINA B-standard entry time of 1:01.76. She challenged seven other swimmers on the second heat, including five-time Olympian Mette Jacobsen of Denmark. She edged out Iceland's Kolbrún Yr Kristjánsdóttir to pick up a fourth spot by 0.32 of a second in 1:02.01. Papadopoulou failed to advance into the semifinals, as she placed twenty-ninth overall on the first day of preliminaries.

Maria Papadopoulou currently works in the Limassol Municipality and holds the position of the Manager of the Sports Office at Limassol Municipality. She is also the founder of a swimwear brand AquaButterfly, which he had bootstrapped.

Papadopoulou is a former member of the swimming team for Arizona Wildcats, and a graduate of management information systems at the University of Arizona in Tucson, Arizona.
