= Dianna Ley =

Australian Paralympic swimmer

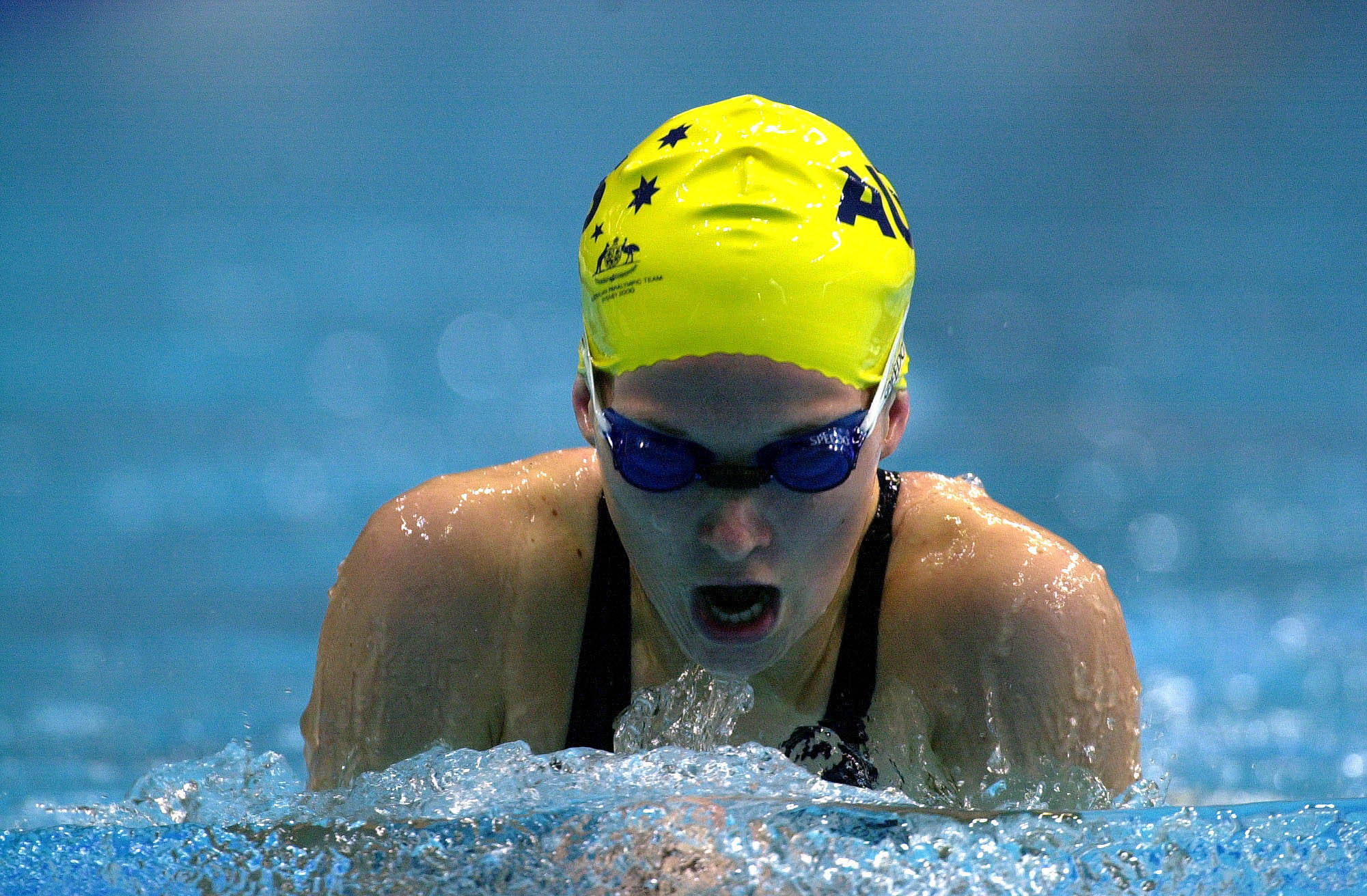
- Action shot of Ley in the pool during the 200 m medley SM9 at the 2000 Summer Paralympics

Personal information
- Nationality: Australia
- Born: 28 August 1984 (age 41) Sydney, New South Wales
Medal record
Swimming
Paralympic Games
Bronze medal – third place	2000 Sydney	Women's 400 m Freestyle S9
IPC Swimming World Championships
Gold medal – first place	2002 Mar Del Plata	Women's 100 m Freestyle S9
Gold medal – first place	2002 Mar Del Plata	Women's Open Water 5km
Silver medal – second place	2002 Mar Del Plata	Women's 400 m Freestyle S9

Dianna Ley (born 28 August 1984) is a Paralympic swimming competitor from Australia. She won a bronze medal at the 2000 Sydney Games in the Women's 400 m Freestyle S9 event. She was born on 28 August 1984 in Sydney, New South Wales.
