= Andrew Mackay (swimmer) =

Caymanian swimmer (born 1985)

Personal information
- Full name: Andrew Mackay
- Nationality: Cayman Islands
- Born: 1 November 1985 (age 41)
- Height: 5 ft 10 in (1.78 m)
- Weight: 81 kg (179 lb)

Sport
- Sport: Swimming
- Club: Stingray Swim Club
- College team: Notre Dame (USA) (2004-2008)

Andrew Mackay (born 1 November 1985) is an Olympic-swimmer from the Cayman Islands. He swam for the Cayman Islands at the 2004 Olympics, the 2002 Commonwealth Games, and the 2006 Commonwealth Games. He swam in college in the US for the University of Notre Dame.

In 2003, he became the first Cayman Island swimmer (as well as the first Notre Dame swimmer) to ever qualify for the Olympics.

He swam at:

- 2002 Commonwealth Games
- 2003 World Championships
- 2003 Pan American Games
- 2004 Olympics
- 2004 World Championships
- 2006 Commonwealth Games
