= Mandy Leach =

Zimbabwean swimmer (born 1979)

Personal information
- Born: August 20, 1979 (age 46)

Sport
- Sport: Swimming
- Club: LSU Lady Tigers
Medal record
Representing Zimbabwe
All-Africa Games
Gold medal – first place	1999 Johannesburg	4x100m freestyle relay
Silver medal – second place	1999 Johannesburg	4x200m freestyle relay
Silver medal – second place	1999 Johannesburg	4x100m medley relay
Bronze medal – third place	1999 Johannesburg	200m backstroke
Bronze medal – third place	1999 Johannesburg	200m individual medley

Mandy K. Leach (born 20 August 1979) is a retired female freestyle swimmer from Zimbabwe. She represented her native African country at the 2000 Summer Olympics in Sydney, Australia. There, as a 200m free-stylist, she passed the preliminary rounds in 2:01.05 and continued into the semi-finals where she ended up in 13th place in the overall-rankings, clocking at 2:00.60 in the semi-finals.
