= Georgina Lee =

English swimmer

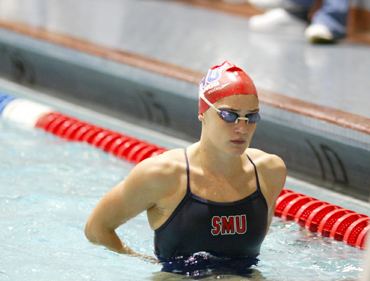

Personal information
- Full name: Georgina Anne Lee
- National team: Great Britain
- Born: 14 August 1981 (age 45) Birmingham, England
- Height: 1.73 m (5 ft 8 in)
- Weight: 62 kg (137 lb; 9.8 st)

Sport
- Sport: Swimming
- Strokes: Freestyle, butterfly
- Club: Camp Hill Edwardians
- College team: Southern Methodist University
Medal record
Women's swimming
Representing Great Britain
European Championships (SC)
| Bronze medal – third place | 2001 Antwerp | 200 m butterfly |
Representing England
Commonwealth Games
| Gold medal – first place | 2002 Manchester | 4×200 m freestyle |
| Silver medal – second place | 2002 Manchester | 200 m butterfly |
| Bronze medal – third place | 2002 Manchester | 4×100 m medley |

Georgina Anne Lee (born 14 August 1981) is a female English former competitive swimmer.

== Swimming career ==
Lee represented Great Britain in the Olympics and European championships, and competed for England in the Commonwealth Games.

Lee won gold, silver, and bronze medals at the 2002 Commonwealth Games. She was also a bronze medallist at the European SC Championships in 2001.

Lee represented Great Britain at both the 2000 Summer Olympics in Sydney and the 2004 Summer Olympics in Athens. In Sydney she reached the semifinal in the 200-metre butterfly, breaking the British Record and finishing in 10th place. In Athens she reached the semifinal in the 200-metre butterfly, again finishing in 10th place, and she reached the final in both the 4×100-metre medley relay and the 4×200-metre freestyle relay. She also competed in the 100-metre butterfly but did not progress beyond the heats.

Lee set 14 British records between 2000 and 2004, and at the ASA National British Championships she won the 100 metres butterfly title in 2001, 2002 and 2004 and the 200 metres butterfly title in 2000, 2001, 2002 and 2004.

Attending Southern Methodist University in Dallas, Texas, between 2001 and 2004, Lee won two titles at the U.S. National Championships in 2003. She was also champion and runner-up at the NCAA national collegiate championships, and she was awarded an NCAA postgraduate scholarship upon graduation.

== Personal life ==
Lee was born the youngest of 6 children and was educated at King Edward VI High School For Girls in Birmingham. In 1999 her father, Malcolm Lee, died from a heart attack. In 2003 her brother, Adrian Lee, died in a suspected suicide from an overdose of prescribed pills for depression. Lee did not talk publicly about her brother's death until a year later, when she gave an interview in April 2004 to Craig Lord of The Times.
