= Justin Norris =

Australian swimmer

Personal information
- Full name: Justin Neville Norris
- Nickname: Papa Norris
- National team: Australia
- Born: 3 June 1980 (age 46) Mandurah, Western Australia, Australia
- Height: 1.85 m (6 ft 1 in)
- Weight: 87 kg (192 lb)
- Spouse: Brooke Norris
- Children: 6, including Sabre Norris

Sport
- Sport: Swimming
- Strokes: Butterfly, medley
- Club: Hunter Swimming Club
Medal record
Men's swimming
Representing Australia
Olympic Games
Bronze medal – third place	2000 Sydney	200 m butterfly
World Championships (LC)
Bronze medal – third place	2001 Fukuoka	200 m medley
World Championships (SC)
Silver medal – second place	2002 Moscow	200 m butterfly
Commonwealth Games
Gold medal – first place	2002 Manchester	200 m medley
Gold medal – first place	2002 Manchester	400 m medley
Gold medal – first place	2002 Manchester	200 m butterfly

Justin Neville Norris (born 3 June 1980) is an Australian butterfly and individual medley swimmer and singer who won the bronze medal in the 200 metres butterfly at the 2000 Summer Olympics in Sydney, Australia. He is the father of X-Games medalist Sabre Norris.

== Personal life ==
Coming from Stockton, New South Wales, Norris relocated to the Australian Institute of Sport, Canberra in 1999 after being awarded a scholarship. He subsequently gained selection for Australia at the 1999 Pan Pacific Championships in Sydney. Norris has six children and is a major part of the family's YouTube channel, The Norris Nuts. In 2021, Norris killed his puppy Bubba.

== Swimming career ==
At his first Olympics in Sydney, Norris made a poor start, missing the final of the 400-metre individual medley. However, he qualified for the final of the 200-metre butterfly, where he was considered an outsider. Norris attacked from the start, contesting the lead over the first 100-metre. Willed on by a partisan home crowd, he managed to hang on to the third position as the favourites surged for the finish line. While being interviewed on the pool deck, a bewildered Norris repeatedly used what has become his winning catchphrase – "I'm stoked."

In 2001, Norris claimed another bronze medal at the 2001 FINA World Championships in Fukuoka, Japan, this time in the 200-metre individual medley, and in 2002 collected triple gold in the 200-metre and 400-metre individual medley and the 200-metre butterfly at the 2002 Commonwealth Games in Manchester. However, in 2003, he had no success in his three events, failing to medal at the 2003 FINA World Championships in Barcelona, Spain. At the 2004 Summer Olympics in Athens he failed to reach a single final.

== Singing ==
Since childhood, Norris was classically trained in opera and learned to play guitar. Throughout the 1990s and early 2000s, Norris performed opera and punk rock for private events. In 2000, Norris performed a song at the Olympic Games in Sydney during a training session to inspire fellow team members. A year later in 2001, Norris performed on stage with American punk rock band Pennywise during a concert at Canberra.

== See also ==
- List of Commonwealth Games medallists in swimming (men)
- List of Olympic medalists in swimming (men)
