= Aquatics at the 2002 Commonwealth Games =

- Venue: Manchester Aquatics Centre
- Location: Manchester, England
- Dates: 25 July to 4 August 2002

Aquatics at the 2002 Commonwealth Games was the 17th appearances of both Swimming at the Commonwealth Games and Diving at the Commonwealth Games and the fifth appearance of Synchronised swimming at the Commonwealth Games. Competition was held in Manchester, England, from 25 July to 4 August 2002.

The aquatics events were held at the Manchester Aquatics Centre and featured 50 events in three disciplines: diving (6), swimming (42) and synchronized swimming (2).

Australia topped the aquatics (all events) medal table with 30 gold medals.

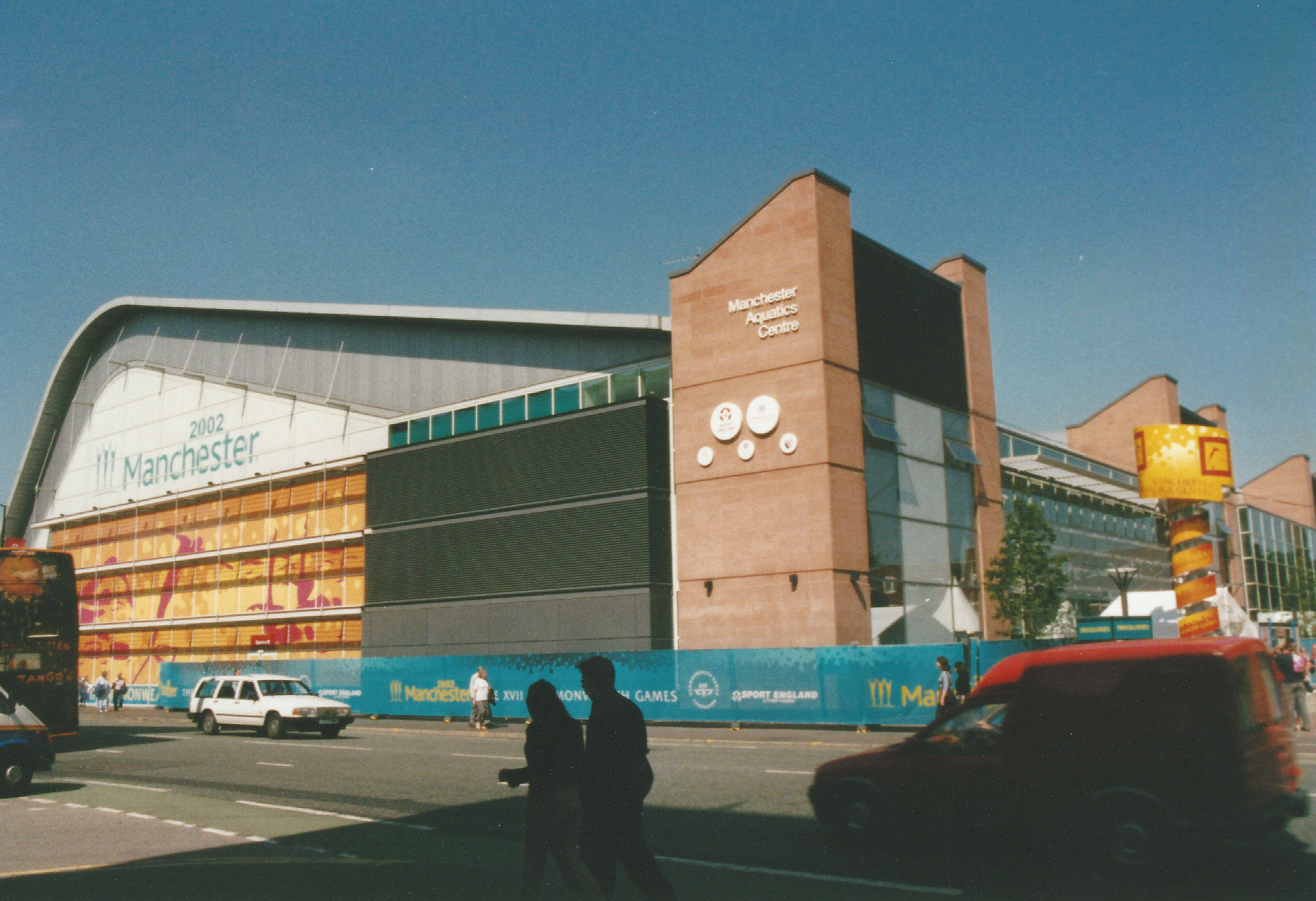
Manchester Aquatics Centre during the Games

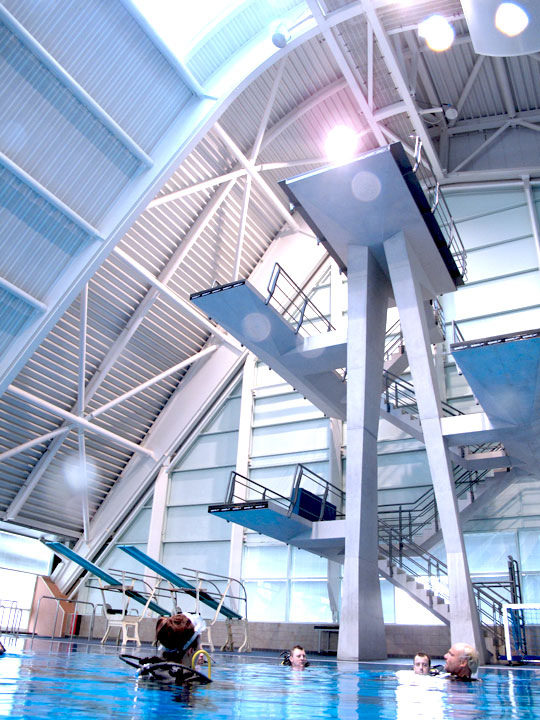
The diving facility

== Medal table (all aquatic sports) ==
* Host nation (England)

Rank	Nation	Gold	Silver	Bronze	Total
1	Australia	30	13	12	55
2	England*	11	13	16	40
3	Canada	4	11	12	27
4	South Africa	3	9	3	15
5	Scotland	1	2	2	5
6	Zimbabwe	1	0	0	1
7	Malaysia	0	1	1	2
7	New Zealand	0	1	1	2
9	Jamaica	0	0	2	2
10	Wales	0	0	1	1
Totals (10 entries)		50	50	50	150

== See also ==
- List of Commonwealth Games records in swimming
