= Zimbabwe at the 2002 Commonwealth Games =

- CG code: ZIM
- CGA: Zimbabwe Olympic Committee
- Website: zoc.co.zw

in Manchester, England
- Medals: Gold 1 Silver 1 Bronze 0 Total 2

Commonwealth Games appearances (overview)
- 1934; 1938; 1950; 1954; 1958; 1962–1978; 1982; 1986; 1990; 1994; 1998; 2002

Other related appearances
- Rhodesia and Nyasaland (1962)

Zimbabwe (abbreviated ZIM) was represented at the 2002 Commonwealth Games, but did not take part in 2006 after withdrawing from the Commonwealth.

The country had taken part in the Commonwealth Games from the second games in 1934: first as Southern Rhodesia, then as Rhodesia and Nyasaland, then as Zimbabwe.

== Medals ==
	Gold	Silver	Bronze	Total
Zimbabwe	1	1	0	2

The medals were awarded in Swimming and Lawn Bowls (Blind), see 2002 Commonwealth Games results.

== See also ==
- Zimbabwe at the Commonwealth Games
