= List of Commonwealth Games medallists in table tennis =

This is the complete list of Commonwealth Games medallists in table tennis from 2002 to 2014.

== Men's singles ==
| Event | Gold | Silver | Bronze |
|---|---|---|---|
| 2002 | Segun Toriola (NGR) | Wenguan Johnny Huang (CAN) | Duan Yong Jun (SIN) |
| 2002 | Segun Toriola (NGR) | Wenguan Johnny Huang (CAN) | Chetan Baboor (IND) |
| 2006 | Sharath Kamal (IND) | William Henzell (AUS) | Segun Toriola (NGR) |
| 2010 | Yang Zi (SIN) | Gao Ning (SIN) | Sharath Kamal (IND) |
| 2014 | Zhan Jian (SIN) | Gao Ning (SIN) | Liam Pitchford (ENG) |
| 2018 | Gao Ning (SGP) | Quadri Aruna (NGR) | Sharath Kamal (IND) |
| 2022 | Sharath Kamal (IND) | Liam Pitchford (ENG) | Sathiyan Gnanasekaran (IND) |

== Women's singles ==
| Event | Gold | Silver | Bronze |
|---|---|---|---|
| 2002 | Chunli Li (NZL) | Li Jiawei (SIN) | Jing Junhong (SIN) |
| 2002 | Chunli Li (NZL) | Li Jiawei (SIN) | Tan Paey Fern (SIN) |
| 2006 | Zhang Xueling (SIN) | Li Jiawei (SIN) | Xu Yan (SIN) |
| 2010 | Feng Tianwei (SIN) | Yu Mengyu (SIN) | Wang Yuegu (SIN) |
| 2014 | Feng Tianwei (SIN) | Yu Mengyu (SIN) | Lin Ye (SIN) |
| 2018 | Manika Batra (IND) | Yu Mengyu (SGP) | Feng Tianwei (SGP) |
| 2022 | Feng Tianwei (SIN) | Jian Zeng (SIN) | Liu Yangzi (AUS) |

== Men's doubles ==
| Event | Gold | Silver | Bronze |
|---|---|---|---|
| 2002 | Andrew Baggaley and Gareth Herbert (ENG) | Adam Robertson and Ryan Jenkins (WAL) | Duan Yong Jun and Zhang Tai Yong (SIN) |
| 2002 | Andrew Baggaley and Gareth Herbert (ENG) | Adam Robertson and Ryan Jenkins (WAL) | Raman Subramanyan and Chetan Baboor (IND) |
| 2006 | Monday Merotohun and Segun Toriola (NGR) | Andrew Baggaley and Andrew Rushton (ENG) | Cai Xiaoli and Yang Zi (SIN) |
| 2010 | Sharath Kamal and Subhajit Saha (IND) | Gao Ning and Yang Zi (SIN) | Andrew Baggaley and Liam Pitchford (ENG) |
| 2014 | Gao Ning and Li Hu (SIN) | Sharath Kamal and Anthony Amalraj (IND) | Yang Zi and Zhan Jian (SIN) |
| 2018 | Paul Drinkhall; Liam Pitchford (ENG) | Sharath Kamal; Sathiyan Gnanasekaran (IND) | Harmeet Desai; Sanil Shankar Shetty (IND) |
| 2022 | Paul Drinkhall; Liam Pitchford (ENG) | Sharath Kamal; Sathiyan Gnanasekaran (IND) | Poh Shao; Clarence Chew (SGP) |

== Women's doubles ==
| Event | Gold | Silver | Bronze |
|---|---|---|---|
| 2002 | Jing Junhong and Li Jiawei (SIN) | Karen Li and Chunli Li (NZL) | Tan Paey Fern and Zhang Xueling (SIN) |
| 2002 | Jing Junhong and Li Jiawei (SIN) | Karen Li and Chunli Li (NZL) | Jian Fang Lay and Miao Miao (AUS) |
| 2006 | Li Jiawei and Zhang Xueling (SIN) | Tan Paey Fern and Xu Yan (SIN) | Jian Fang Lay and Miao Miao (AUS) |
| 2010 | Li Jiawei and Sun Beibei (SIN) | Feng Tianwei and Wang Yuegu (SIN) | Mouma Das and Poulomi Ghatak (IND) |
| 2014 | Feng Tianwei and Yu Mengyu (SIN) | Miao Miao and Jian Fang Lay (AUS) | Anqi Luo and Zhang Mo (CAN) |
| 2018 | Feng Tianwei; Yu Mengyu (SIN) | Manika Batra; Mouma Das (IND) | Ho Ying; Karen Lyne (MAS) |
| 2022 | Feng Tianwei; Jian Zeng (SIN) | Jee Minhyung; Jian Fang Lay (AUS) | Charolette Carey; Anna Hursey (WAL) |

== Mixed doubles ==
| Event | Gold | Silver | Bronze |
|---|---|---|---|
| 2002 | Duan Yong Jun and Li Jiawei (SIN) | Brett Clarke and Jian Fang Lay (AUS) | Zhang Tai Yong and Jing Junhong (SIN) |
| 2002 | Duan Yong Jun and Li Jiawei (SIN) | Brett Clarke and Jian Fang Lay (AUS) | Peter Jackson and Chunli Li (NZL) |
| 2006 | Zhang Xueling and Yang Zi (SIN) | Li Jiawei and Cai Xiaoli (SIN) | Tan Paey Fern and Jason Ho (SIN) |
| 2010 | Wang Yuegu and Yang Zi (SIN) | Feng Tianwei and Gao Ning (SIN) | Joanna Parker and Paul Drinkhall (ENG) |
| 2014 | Paul Drinkhall and Joanna Drinkhall (ENG) | Liam Pitchford and Tin-Tin Ho (ENG) | Daniel Reed and Kelly Sibley (ENG) |
| 2018 | Gao Ning; Yu Mengyu (SIN) | Liam Pitchford; Tin-Tin Ho (ENG) | Sathiyan Gnanasekaran; Manika Batra (IND) |
| 2022 | Sharath Kamal; Sreeja Akula (IND) | Choong Javen; Karen Lyne (MAS) | Clarence Chew; Zeng Jian (SIN) |

== Men's team ==
| Event | Gold | Silver | Bronze |
|---|---|---|---|
| 2002 | England; Alex Perry; Andrew Baggaley; Gareth Herbert; Matthew Syed; Terry Young | Nigeria; Ayemojuba Sau; Kazeem Nosiru; Monday Merotohun; Suraju Saka; Segun Toriola | Singapore; Cai Xiaoli; Duan Yong Jun; Leng Chih Cheng; Sen Yew Fai; Zhang Tai Yong |
| 2002 | England; Alex Perry; Andrew Baggaley; Gareth Herbert; Matthew Syed; Terry Young | Nigeria; Ayemojuba Sau; Kazeem Nosiru; Monday Merotohun; Suraju Saka; Segun Toriola | India; Chetan Baboor; Chakraborty Sourav; Soumyadeep Roy; Subhajit Saha; Raman Subramanyan |
| 2006 | India Sharath Kamal; Shibaji Datta; Soumyadeep Roy; Subhajit Saha | Singapore Clarence Lee; Han-Ting Lee; Jason Ho; Cai Xiaoli; Yang Zi | Nigeria Kazeem Nosiru; Monday Merotohun; Segun Toriola; Seun Mobi Ajetun; Tajudeen Jegede |
| 2010 | Singapore Cai Xiaoli; Gao Ning; Ma Liang; Pang Xuejie; Yang Zi | England Andrew Baggaley; Paul Drinkhall; Darius Knight; Liam Pitchford; Daniel Reed | India Sharath Kamal; Anthony Amalraj; Abiishek Ravichandran; Soumyadeep Roy; Subhajit Saha |
| 2014 | Singapore Chew Zheyu Clarence; Gao Ning; Li Hu; Yang Zi; Zhan Jian | England Andrew Baggaley; Paul Drinkhall; Liam Pitchford; Daniel Reed; Sam Walker | Nigeria Bode Abiodun; Quadri Aruna; Jide Ogidiolu; Ojo Onaolapo; Segun Toriola |
| 2018 | India Sharath Kamal; Anthony Amalraj; Harmeet Desai; Sanil Shetty; Sathiyan Gnanasekaran | Nigeria Bode Abiodun; Quadri Aruna; Azeez Jamiu; Olajide Omotayo; Segun Toriola | England Paul Drinkhall; David McBeath; Liam Pitchford; Sam Walker |
| 2022 | India Sharath Kamal; Harmeet Desai; Sanil Shetty; Sathiyan Gnanasekaran | Singapore Clarence Chew; Poh Shao; Koen Pang; Izaac Quek | England Paul Drinkhall; Tom Jarvis; Liam Pitchford; Sam Walker |

== Women's team ==
| Event | Gold | Silver | Bronze |
|---|---|---|---|
| 2002 | Singapore; Jing Junhong; Li Jiawei; Tan Paey Fern; Zhang Xueling | Australia; Cho Yuen-Wern; Jian Fang Lay; Miao Miao; Peri Campbell-Innes; Tammy Gough | New Zealand; Karen Li; Chunli Li; Tracey McLauchlan; Laura-Lee Smith |
| 2002 | Singapore; Jing Junhong; Li Jiawei; Tan Paey Fern; Zhang Xueling | Australia; Cho Yuen-Wern; Jian Fang Lay; Miao Miao; Peri Campbell-Innes; Tammy Gough | Canada; Petra Cada; Geng Lijuan; Marie-Christine Roussy; Chris Xu |
| 2006 | Singapore Zhang Xueling; Li Jiawei; Tan Paey Fern; Xu Yan; Zena Sim | Australia Miao Miao; Stephanie Sang; Jian Fang Lay; May Cho; Peri Campbell Innes | India Kasturi Chakraborty; Poulomi Ghatak; Mouma Das; Nandita Saha; Shamini Kumaresan |
| 2010 | Singapore Feng Tianwei; Li Jiawei; Sun Beibei; Wang Yuegu; Yu Mengyu | India Mouma Das; Poulomi Ghatak; Shamini Kumaresan; Mamta Prabhu; Madhurika Suhas Patkar | Malaysia Beh Lee Wei; Chiu Soo Jiin; Fan Xiao Jun; Ng Sock Khim |
| 2014 | Singapore Feng Tianwei; LI Siyun Isabelle; Lin Ye; Yu Mengyu; Zhou Yihan | Malaysia Beh Lee Wei; Ho Ying; Lee Rou You; Ng Sock Khim | Australia Miao Miao; Zhenhua Dederko; Jian Fang Lay; Melissa Tapper; Ziyu Zhang |
| 2018 | India Manika Batra; Mouma Das; Sutirtha Mukherjee; Madhurika Patkar; Pooja Sahasrabudhe | Singapore Feng Tianwei; Lin Ye; Yu Mengyu; Zhang Wanling; Zhou Yihan | England Tin-Tin Ho; Denise Payet; Kelly Sibley; Maria Tsaptsinos |
| 2022 | Singapore; Zeng Jian; Zhou Jing Yi; Feng Tianwei; Wong Xin Ru | Malaysia; Tee Ai Xin; Alice Chang; Karen Lyne; Ho Ying | Australia; Feng Chunyi; Jian Fang Lay; Jee Minhyung; Liu Yangzi |
