= Athletics at the 2002 Commonwealth Games – Men's 100 metres =

Common Wealth 100 meters Event

Men's 100 metres at the 2002 Commonwealth Games
- Venue: City of Manchester Stadium
- Dates: 26 July 2002 (heats); 26 July 2002 (quarter finals); 27 July 2002 (semi finals); 27 July 2002 (final)
- Competitors: 55 from 33 nations
- Winning time: 9.98

Medalists
gold medal	Kim Collins	Saint Kitts and Nevis
silver medal	Uchenna Emedolu	Nigeria
bronze medal	Pierre Browne	Canada

The men's 100 metres event at the 2002 Commonwealth Games took place on 26 and 27 July at the City of Manchester Stadium in Manchester, England. Kim Collins won the gold medal in a new national record time of 9.98 seconds giving Saint Kitts and Nevis its first ever medal at the Commonwealth Games. Nigerian Uchenna Emedolu finished in second, taking the silver medal in 10.11. Pierre Browne of Canada won the bronze in a personal best time of 10.12.

This was the ninth running of the 100 metres event at the Commonwealth Games after converting to metric at the 1970 Edinburgh Games. A 100 yard event was contested between 1930 and 1966. 55 competitors from 33 nations entered the event. The English pairing of Mark Lewis-Francis and Dwain Chambers, who had both ran sub-10 seconds the month prior, both suffered injuries in the final. Lewis-Francis had to be stretched off the track. Collins, the bronze medallist in the 200 metres at the 2001 World Championships only decided to contest this event on the morning of the heats.

The defending champion from Kuala Lumpur, Ato Boldon from Trinidad and Tobago withdrew from the Games due to lack of fitness as a result of an injury earlier in the season. The silver medallist from four years ago, Namibia's Frankie Fredericks pulled out of the event on the morning of the heats to focus on the 200 metre event which he went on to win. Barbadian Obadele Thompson, the Commonwealth and Olympic bronze medallist, pulled out the event after the heats due to a groin injury.

Kim Collins was the first athlete to be subject to a urine test during the Games after his victory. He tested positive for salbutamol, an anabolic steroid. He claimed he had been taking the drug to treat his asthma but he failed to report this. The Commonwealth Games Federation found him in breach of the rules and he was reprimanded but was ultimately allowed to keep his gold medal. Collins was cleared after undergoing a respiratory function test by an independent doctor who confirmed his condition and due to the level found in his system was permissible and not considered performance-enhancing.

== Records ==
Prior to this competition, the existing records were as follows:

Records before the 2002 Commonwealth Games
Record	Time (s)	Athlete (nation)	Meet	Location	Date	Ref
World record	9.79	Maurice Greene (USA)	Athens Grand Prix Tsiklitiria	Athens, Greece	16 June 1999	
Commonwealth record	9.84	Donovan Bailey (CAN)	Olympics	Atlanta, United States	27 July 1996	
Commonwealth record	9.84	Bruny Surin (CAN)	World Championships	Seville, Spain	22 August 1996	
Games record	9.88	Ato Boldon (TRI)	Commonwealth Games	Kuala Lumpur, Malaysia	17 September 1998	

== Results ==
=== Heats ===
The heats were held on 26 July, starting at 12:22 in the afternoon.

Qualification Rules: First 4 in each heat (Q) and the best 4 of remaining athletes (q) advance to the quarter finals.

==== Heat 1 ====
Results of heat 1
Rank	Athlete	Nation	Time	Notes
1	Mark Lewis-Francis	England	10.25	Q
2	Obadele Thompson	Barbados	10.47	Q
3	Tamunosiki Atorudibo	Nigeria	10.61	Q
4	Gabrieli Waaivanua	Fiji	10.95	Q
5	Mohd Roache	Samoa	11.10	
6	Md Humayan Kabir	Bangladesh	11.23	
7	David Lightbourne	Turks and Caicos Islands	11.34	
8	Billi Paea	Niue	11.41	NR
			Wind: -0.2 m/s	

==== Heat 2 ====
Results of heat 2
Rank	Athlete	Nation	Time	Notes
1	Michael Frater	Jamaica	10.44	Q
2	Eric Nkansah	Ghana	10.48	Q
3	Anninos Marcoullides	Cyprus	10.56	Q
4	Gibrilla Bangura	Sierra Leone	10.65	Q
5	Jamie Henthorn	Wales	10.81	q
6	Karibataake Katimiri	Kiribati	12.08	
	Frankie Fredericks	Namibia	DNS	
			Wind: -0.7 m/s	

==== Heat 3 ====
Results of heat 3
Rank	Athlete	Nation	Time	Notes
1	Asafa Powell	Jamaica	10.30	Q, PB
2	Christie van Wyk	Namibia	10.38	Q
3	Kim Collins	Saint Kitts and Nevis	10.39	Q
4	Brian Dzingai	Zimbabwe	10.61	Q, PB
5	Peter Pulu	Papua New Guinea	10.84	q
6	Ousman Jatta	The Gambia	10.93	
7	David Victoire	Mauritius	10.95	
8	Ali Yasir Rai	Pakistan	11.19	
			Wind: -0.2 m/s	

==== Heat 4 ====
Results of heat 4
Rank	Athlete	Nation	Time	Notes
1	Uchenna Emedolu	Nigeria	10.42	Q
2	Pierre Browne	Canada	10.47	Q
3	Dallas Roberts	New Zealand	10.70	Q
4	Joseph Batangdon	Cameroon	10.76	Q
5	Tom Ganda	Sierra Leone	10.85	
6	Robert Nidithawae	Vanuatu	11.48	
	Kareem Streete-Thompson	Cayman Islands	DNS	
	Rachid Chouhal	Malta	DNS	
			Wind: -0.5 m/s	

==== Heat 5 ====
Results of heat 5
Rank	Athlete	Nation	Time	Notes
1	Dwain Chambers	England	10.19	Q
2	Nicolas Macrozonaris	Canada	10.27	Q
3	Dwight Thomas	Jamaica	10.29	Q
4	Kevin Williams	Wales	10.63	Q
5	Lamin Sanyang	The Gambia	10.80	q
6	Kurvin Wallace	Saint Kitts and Nevis	10.93	
7	Jamial Rolle	Bahamas	10.99	
8	Dwenney Musgrove	Turks and Caicos Islands	11.44	
			Wind: +0.3 m/s	

==== Heat 6 ====
Results of heat 6
Rank	Athlete	Nation	Time	Notes
1	Aziz Zakari	Ghana	10.31	Q
2	Jason Gardener	England	10.34	Q
3	Joselyn Thomas	Sierra Leone	10.53	Q
4	Claude Toukéné-Guébogo	Cameroon	10.62	Q
5	Jacey Harper	Trinidad and Tobago	10.66	q
6	Harmon Harmon	Cook Islands	11.39	
7	Mathew Faleuka	Niue	11.52	
8	Sultan Saeed	Maldives	11.89	
			Wind: +0.1 m/s	

==== Heat 7 ====
Results of heat 7
Rank	Athlete	Nation	Time	Notes
1	Deji Aliu	Nigeria	10.44	Q
2	Anson Henry	Canada	10.45	Q
3	Serge Bengono	Cameroon	10.54	Q
4	Moave Vu	Fiji	10.88	Q
5	Maruf Reza	Bangladesh	10.98	
6	Azik Graham	Saint Vincent and the Grenadines	10.99	
7	Reuben Apuri	Solomon Islands	11.06	
8	Afele Leona	Niue	11.36	NR
			Wind: -0.3 m/s	

=== Quarter finals ===
The quarter finals were held on 26 July, starting at 18:35 in the evening.

Qualification: First 4 of each heat qualified directly (Q) for the semi finals.

==== Quarter final 1 ====
Results of quarter final 1
Rank	Athlete	Nation	Time	Notes
1	Dwain Chambers	England	10.17	Q
2	Dwight Thomas	Jamaica	10.30	Q
3	Nicolas Macrozonaris	Canada	10.37	Q
4	Joseph Batangdon	Cameroon	10.45	Q
5	Joselyn Thomas	Sierra Leone	10.47	
6	Christie van Wyk	Namibia	10.58	
7	Kevin Williams	Wales	10.65	
8	Peter Pulu	Papua New Guinea	10.73	
			Wind: +0.7 m/s	

==== Quarter final 2 ====
Results of quarter final 2
Rank	Athlete	Nation	Time	Notes
1	Mark Lewis-Francis	England	10.13	Q
2	Kim Collins	Saint Kitts and Nevis	10.20	Q
3	Michael Frater	Jamaica	10.31	Q
4	Anson Henry	Canada	10.36	Q
5	Serge Bengono	Cameroon	10.58	
6	Gibrilla Bangura	Sierra Leone	10.64	PB
7	Jamie Henthorn	Wales	10.74	
	Tamunosiki Atorudibo	Nigeria	DNF	
			Wind: +0.7 m/s	

==== Quarter final 3 ====
Results of quarter final 3
Rank	Athlete	Nation	Time	Notes
1	Deji Aliu	Nigeria	10.16	Q
2	Asafa Powell	Jamaica	10.28	Q, PB
3	Eric Nkansah	Ghana	10.32	Q
4	Jason Gardener	England	10.33	Q
5	Anninos Marcoullides	Cyprus	10.52	
6	Claude Toukéné-Guébogo	Cameroon	10.76	
7	Lamin Sanyang	The Gambia	10.78	PB
8	Moave Vu	Fiji	10.91	
			Wind: +0.7 m/s	

==== Quarter final 4 ====
Results of quarter final 4
Rank	Athlete	Nation	Time	Notes
1	Uchenna Emedolu	Nigeria	10.19	Q
2	Pierre Browne	Canada	10.28	Q
3	Aziz Zakari	Ghana	10.33	Q
4	Brian Dzingai	Zimbabwe	10.62	Q
5	Jacey Harper	Trinidad and Tobago	10.63	
6	Dallas Roberts	New Zealand	10.69	
	Obadele Thompson	Barbados	DNS	
	Gabrieli Waaivanua	Fiji	DNS	
			Wind: 0.0 m/s	

=== Semi finals ===
The semi finals were held on 27 July, starting at 19:05 in the evening.

Qualification: First 4 of each heat qualified directly (Q) for the final.

==== Semi final 1 ====
Results of semi final 1
Rank	Athlete	Nation	Time	Notes
1	Kim Collins	Saint Kitts and Nevis	10.08	Q
2	Mark Lewis-Francis	England	10.15	Q
3	Dwight Thomas	Jamaica	10.16	Q
4	Uchenna Emedolu	Nigeria	10.16	Q
5	Aziz Zakari	Ghana	10.17	
6	Nicolas Macrozonaris	Canada	10.29	
7	Michael Frater	Jamaica	10.30	
8	Brian Dzingai	Zimbabwe	10.59	PB
			Wind: +0.2 m/s	

==== Semi final 2 ====
Results of semi final 2
Rank	Athlete	Nation	Time	Notes
1	Dwain Chambers	England	10.06	Q
2	Deji Aliu	Nigeria	10.14	Q
3	Pierre Browne	Canada	10.20	Q
4	Jason Gardener	England	10.21	Q
5	Asafa Powell	Jamaica	10.26	PB
6	Eric Nkansah	Ghana	10.29	SB
7	Anson Henry	Canada	10.34	
8	Joseph Batangdon	Cameroon	10.37	
			Wind: +0.8 m/s	

=== Final ===
The final was held at 20:35 on 27 July.

Results of the final
Rank	Athlete	Nation	Time	Notes
1st place, gold medalist(s)	Kim Collins	Saint Kitts and Nevis	9.98	NR
2nd place, silver medalist(s)	Uchenna Emedolu	Nigeria	10.11	
3rd place, bronze medalist(s)	Pierre Browne	Canada	10.12	PB
4	Deji Aliu	Nigeria	10.15	
5	Dwight Thomas	Jamaica	10.15	
6	Jason Gardener	England	10.22	
7	Mark Lewis-Francis	England	10.54	
8	Dwain Chambers	England	11.19	
			Wind: +0.2 m/s	
