= New Zealand at the 2002 Commonwealth Games =

- CGF code: NZL
- CGA: New Zealand Olympic Committee
- Website: www.olympic.org.nz

in Manchester, England
- Competitors: 200
- Flag bearers: Opening: Sarah Ulmer; Closing: Nigel Avery
- Officials: 102
- Medals Ranked 5th: Gold 11 Silver 13 Bronze 21 Total 45

Commonwealth Games appearances (overview)
- 1930; 1934; 1938; 1950; 1954; 1958; 1962; 1966; 1970; 1974; 1978; 1982; 1986; 1990; 1994; 1998; 2002; 2006; 2010; 2014; 2018; 2022; 2026; 2030

New Zealand sent a team of 200 competitors and 102 officials to the 2002 Commonwealth Games, which were held at Manchester, England. The flagbearer at the opening ceremony was Sarah Ulmer, and at the closing ceremony was Nigel Avery.

New Zealand has competed in every Games, starting with the first British Empire Games in 1930 at Hamilton, Ontario.

== Medal tables ==
Medal	Name	Sport	Event
Gold	Beatrice Faumuina	Athletics	Women's discus throw
Gold	Greg Henderson	Cycling – track	Men's points race
Gold	Sarah Ulmer	Cycling – track	Women's 3000 m individual pursuit
Gold	Joanna Edwards; Sharon Sims	Lawn bowls	Women's pairs
Gold	New Zealand rugby sevens team: Craig De Goldi; Brad Fleming; Chris Masoe; Mils Muliaina; Craig Newby; Roger Randle; Bruce Reihana; Eric Rush; Rodney So'oialo; Karl Te Nana; Anthony Tuitavake; Amasio Valence	Rugby sevens	Men's tournament
Gold	Teresa Borrell; Nadine Stanton	Shooting	Women's double trap pairs
Gold	Leilani Joyce; Carol Owens	Squash	Women's doubles
Gold	Leilani Joyce; Glen Wilson	Squash	Mixed doubles
Gold	Chunli Li	Table tennis	Women's singles
Gold	Nigel Avery	Weightlifting	Men's +105 kg clean & jerk
Gold	Nigel Avery	Weightlifting	Men's +105 kg total
Silver	Craig Barrett	Athletics	Men's 50 km walk
Silver	Philip Jensen	Athletics	Men's hammer throw
Silver	Valerie Vili	Athletics	Women's shot put
Silver	Nicole Gordon; Tammy Jenkins	Badminton	Women's doubles
Silver	Susy Pryde	Cycling – mountain biking	Women's cross country
Silver	New Zealand men's hockey team: Ryan Archibald; Michael Bevin; Phil Burrows; Dean Couzins; Dion Gosling; Bevan Hari; Blair Hopping; David Kosoof; Wayne McIndoe; Umesh Parag; Mitesh Patel; Hayden Shaw; Darren Smith; Peter Stafford; Simon Towns; Paul Woolford	Hockey	Men's tournament
Silver	New Zealand netball team: Jenny-May Coffin; Belinda Colling; Vilimaina Davu; Sheryl Clarke; Donna LoffhagenLesley Nicol; Anna Rowberry; Julie Seymour; Linda Vagana; Irene van Dyk; Anna Veronese; Daneka Wipiiti	Netball	Women's tournament
Silver	Nadine Stanton	Shooting	Women's double trap singles
Silver	Carol Owens	Squash	Women's singles
Silver	Elizabeth Van Welie	Swimming	Women's 400 m individual medley
Silver	Chunli Li; Karen Li	Table tennis	Women's doubles
Silver	Nigel Avery	Weightlifting	Men's +105 kg snatch
Silver	Olivia Baker	Weightlifting	Women's +75 kg snatch
Bronze	Sara Petersen; Daniel Shirley	Badminton	Mixed doubles
Bronze	Geoff Bellingham; Chris Blair; John Gordon; Nicole Gordon; Rebecca Gordon; Tammy Jenkins; Rhona Robertson; Sara Petersen; Daniel Shirley	Badminton	Mixed team
Bronze	Danny Codling	Boxing	Men's welterweight
Bronze	Shane Cameron	Boxing	Men's heavyweight
Bronze	Greg Henderson; Matthew Randall; Hayden Roulston; Lee Vertongen	Cycling – track	Men's team pursuit
Bronze	Tim Slyfield	Boxing	Men's half-middleweight
Bronze	Mike Kernaghan	Lawn bowls	Men's singles
Bronze	Marlene Castle	Lawn bowls	Women's singles
Bronze	Wendy Jensen; Patsy Jorgensen; Jan Khan; Anne Lomas	Lawn bowls	Women's fours
Bronze	Diane Collings	Shooting	Open fullbore rifle singles
Bronze	Tania Corrigan; Jocelyn Lees	Shooting	Women's 25 m pistol pairs
Bronze	Juliet Etherington	Shooting	Women's 50 m prone rifle singles
Bronze	Jocelyn Lees	Shooting	Women's 25 m pistol singles
Bronze	Toni Jeffs	Swimming	Women's 50 m freestyley
Bronze	Peter Jackson; Chunli Li	Table tennis	Mixed doubles
Bronze	Chunli Li; Karen Li; Tracey McLauchlan; Laura-Lee Smith	Table tennis	Women's team
Bronze	Hamish Carter	Triathlon	Men's individual
Bronze	Terry Hughes	Weightlifting	Men's 62 kg clean & jerk
Bronze	Terry Hughes	Weightlifting	Men's 62 kg total
Bronze	Olivia Baker	Weightlifting	Women's +75 kg clean & jerk
Bronze	Olivia Baker	Weightlifting	Women's +75 kg total

Medals by sport
Sport	Gold medal	Silver medal	Bronze medal	Total
Weightlifting	2	2	4	8
Cycling	2	1	1	4
Squash	2	1	0	3
Athletics	1	3	0	4
Shooting	1	1	4	6
Table tennis	1	1	2	4
Lawn bowls	1	0	3	4
Rugby sevens	1	0	0	1
Badminton	0	1	2	3
Swimming	0	1	1	2
Hockey	0	1	0	1
Netball	0	1	0	1
Boxing	0	0	3	3
Triathlon	0	0	1	1
Total	11	13	21	45

Medals by gender
Gender	Gold medal	Silver medal	Bronze medal	Total
Male	4	4	8	16
Female	6	9	9	24
Mixed / open	1	0	4	5
Total	11	13	21	45

== New Zealand's team at the Games ==
=== Athletics ===
==== Men's competition ====
- Michael Aish
- Craig Barrett
- Phil Costley
- John Henwood
- Philip Jensen
- Craig Kirkwood
- Dallas Roberts
- Tony Sargisson
- Jonathan Wyatt

==== Women's competition ====
- Valerie Adams
- Jane Arnott
- Chantal Brunner
- Beatrice Faumuina
- Gabrielle Gorst
- Melina Hamilton
- Tasha Williams

=== Field hockey ===
==== Men's team competition ====
- Ryan Archibald
- Michael Bevin
- Phil Burrows
- Dean Couzins
- Dion Gosling
- Bevan Hari
- Blair Hopping
- David Kosoof
- Wayne McIndoe
- Umesh Parag
- Mitesh Patel
- Hayden Shaw
- Darren Smith
- Peter Stafford
- Simon Towns
- Paul Woolford

==== Women's team competition ====
- Sandy Bennett
- Helen Clarke
- Tara Drysdale
- Paula Enoka
- Amanda Christie
- Anne-Marie Irving
- Caryn Paewai
- Suzie Pearce
- Jaimee Provan
- Niniwa Roberts
- Rachel Robertson
- Moira Senior
- Colleen Gubb-Suddaby
- Rachel Sutherland
- Michelle Turner
- Diana Weavers

=== Judo ===
==== Men's competition ====
- Gareth Knight
- Andrew Ross
- Timothy Slyfield

==== Women's competition ====
- Mellissa Jones
- Elinore Stallworthy
- Rochelle Stormont

=== Netball ===
With a team captained by Julie Seymour and coached by Ruth Aitken, New Zealand were silver medallists in the netball at the 2002 Commonwealth Games. They lost to Australia 57–55 in the gold medal match. The match was tied at 46–46 at the end of normal time, and 14 minutes of extra-time saw the sides still level at 55–55. In sudden death extra-time, Sharelle McMahon scored the vital point to give Australia the necessary two-goal gap to win the gold medal.

Pool A

27 July 2002	New Zealand	101–17	Canada
13:00	Daneka Wipiiti 39; Donna Loffhagen 34; Irene van Dyk 20/21 (95%); Belinda Colling 8	Report	Maralyn Hope 10; Patricia Carlson 7

28 July 2002	New Zealand	116–26	Sri Lanka
13:00	Irene van Dyk 58/61 (95%); Donna Loffhagen 23; Belinda Colling 21; Daneka Wipiiti 14	Report	Prasadi Nalika 14; Sashika Samarasinghe 6 Gishanthi Jayakody 6

29 July 2002	England	35–67	New Zealand
20:30	Abby Teare 22; Alex Astle 13	Report	Irene van Dyk 44/48 (92%); Donna Loffhagen 15; Belinda Colling 8

30 July 2002	New Zealand	81–23	Wales
18:30	Donna Loffhagen 35/38 (92%); Belinda Colling 23; Daneka Wipiiti 23	Report	Mair Jones 9 Sian Edwards 7 Jamilla Harris 7

Table

Pos	Team	P	W	D	L	GF	GA	GD	Pts
1	New Zealand	4	4	0	0	365	101	+264	8
2	England	4	3	0	1	278	145	+133	6
3	Wales	4	2	0	2	138	251	-113	4
4	Canada	4	1	0	3	137	286	-149	2
5	Sri Lanka	4	0	0	4	156	291	-135	0

Qualified for Major semi-finals
Qualified for Minor Semi-finals
Qualified for 7th/10th classification

Major semi-finals

2 August 2002	New Zealand	69–51	Jamaica
18:30	Irene van Dyk 41/48 (85%); Donna Loffhagen 28		Elaine Davis 28; Simone Forbes 23

Gold Medal Match

4 August 2002	Australia	57–55	New Zealand
13:00	Sharelle McMahon 33; Catherine Cox 15; Eloise Southby 9		Irene van Dyk 35; Donna Loffhagen 20	Attendance: 10,000

Squad

New Zealand roster
Players
Coaches

Name	Pos	DOB	Height	Club	Nat	Caps
Jenny-May Coffin	WA, C	9 April 1974 (aged 28)	1.70 m (5 ft 7 in)	Waikato Bay of Plenty Magic
Belinda Colling	GA, GS, WA	12 September 1975 (aged 26)	1.78 m (5 ft 10 in)	Canterbury Flames
Vilimaina Davu	GK	15 January 1977 (aged 25)	1.90 m (6 ft 3 in)	Canterbury Flames
Sheryl Clarke	GD, WD	8 September 1977 (aged 24)	1.78 m (5 ft 10 in)	Northern Force
Donna Loffhagen	GA, GS	29 April 1978 (aged 24)	1.85 m (6 ft 1 in)	Southern Sting
Lesley Nicol	WD, C	9 May 1973 (aged 29)	1.78 m (5 ft 10 in)	Southern Sting
Anna Rowberry	GD	31 March 1976 (aged 26)	1.76 m (5 ft 9 in)	Auckland Diamonds
Julie Seymour (c)	C, WD	29 March 1971 (aged 31)	1.71 m (5 ft 7 in)	Canterbury Flames
Linda Vagana	GK, GD	23 July 1971 (aged 31)	1.87 m (6 ft 2 in)	Northern Force
Irene van Dyk	GS, GA	21 June 1972 (aged 30)	1.90 m (6 ft 3 in)	Capital Shakers
Anna Veronese	GK, GD, WD	20 November 1978 (aged 23)	1.84 m (6 ft 0 in)	Southern Sting
Daneka Wipiiti	GS	8 December 1982 (aged 19)	1.94 m (6 ft 4 in)	Northern Force

Head coach

- Ruth Aitken

Notes

- (c) – Captain
- (cc) – Co-captain
- (vc) – Vice-captain
- – Injury / maternity leave
- (TRP) – Temporary Replacement Player

=== Shooting ===
(incomplete)

==== Men's competition ====
- Mike Collings
- Greg Yelavich

==== Women's competition ====
- Teresa Borrell
- Diane Collings
- Tania Corrigan,
- Juliet Etherington
- Jocelyn Lees
- Nadine Stanton

=== Swimming ===
==== Men's competition ====
- Moss Burmester
- Cameron Gibson
- Dean Kent
- Nicholas Sheeran
- Jonathan Winter

==== Women's competition ====
- Charlotte Glynan
- Melissa Ingram
- Toni Jeffs
- Hannah Mclean
- Vivienne Rignall
- Anna Thomas
- Elizabeth Van Welie
