= Peter Stafford (disambiguation) =

Peter Stafford (1939–2007) was an American writer.

Peter Stafford may also refer to:

- Paul Tabori (1908-1974) British Hungarian author who wrote under the name Peter Stafford.
- Peter Stafford (field hockey) (born 1978), New Zealand field hockey player
