= Raman Subramanyan =

Indian table tennis player

Raman Subramanian
Personal information
- Nationality: Indian
- Born: 23 June 1969 (age 57)
- Height: 188 cm (6 ft 2 in)
- Weight: 72 kg (159 lb)

Sport
- Sport: Table tennis
Medal record
Men's table tennis
Representing India
Commonwealth Games
Bronze medal – third place	2002 Manchester	Men's doubles

Raman Subramanian (born 23 June 1969) is an Indian table tennis player. He competed in the men's doubles event at the 2000 Summer Olympics.
