= Table tennis at the 2002 Commonwealth Games =

Table Tennis at the 2002 Commonwealth Games
- Venue: Table Tennis Centre, Sportcity
- Location: Manchester, England
- Dates: 25 July to 4 August 2002

Table tennis at the 2002 Commonwealth Games was the inaugural appearance of Table tennis at the Commonwealth Games. Competition took place in Manchester, England, from 25 July to 4 August 2002.

The events were held at the Table Tennis Centre in Sportcity at 9 Sportcity Way. In 2026, the venue was the Manchester Tennis and Football Centre and headquarters for the Manchester Football Association.

Singapore topped the table tennis medal table by virtue of winning three gold medals and one silver medal, whereas England did not win a silver medal.

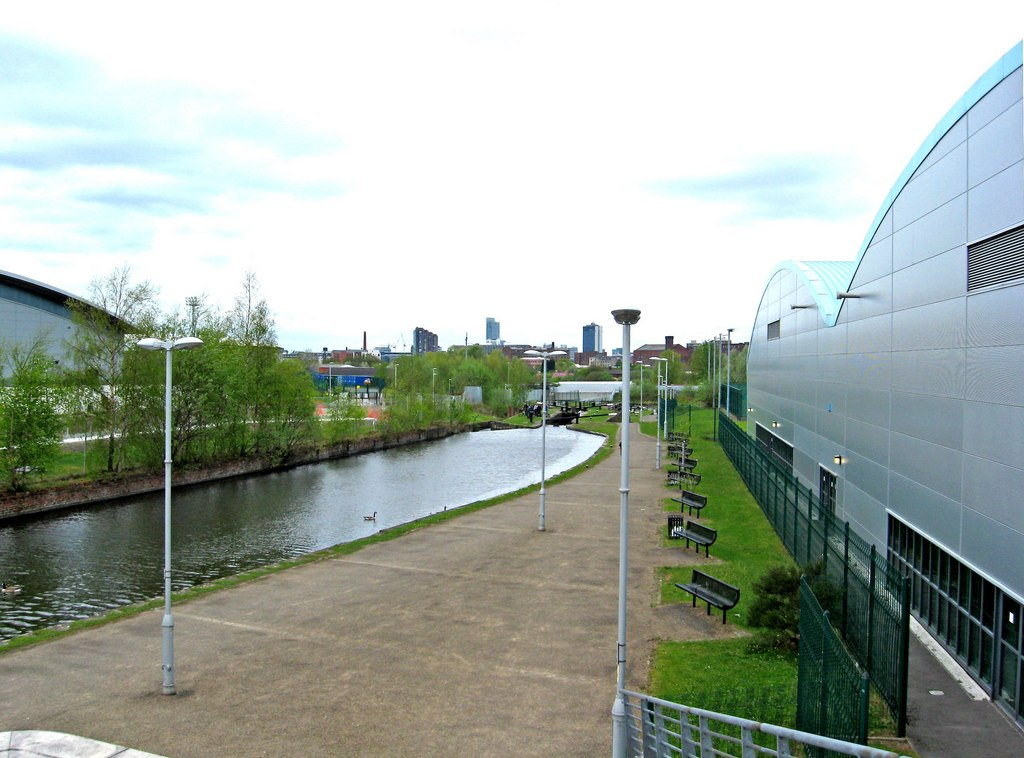
The building on the right hosted the table tennis

== Medal table ==
Rank	Nation	Gold	Silver	Bronze	Total
1	Singapore (SIN)	3	1	7	11
2	England (ENG)	3	0	1	4
3	New Zealand (NZL)	1	1	2	4
4	Nigeria (NGR)	1	1	0	2
5	Australia (AUS)	0	2	2	4
6	Canada (CAN)	0	1	1	2
7	South Africa (SAF)	0	1	0	1
7	Wales (WAL)	0	1	0	1
9	India (IND)	0	0	3	3
Totals (9 entries)		8	8	16	32

== Medallists ==
Event	Gold	Silver	Bronze
Men's singles	Segun Toriola; Nigeria	Wenguan Johnny Huang; Canada	Duan Yong Jun; Singapore
Men's singles	Segun Toriola; Nigeria	Wenguan Johnny Huang; Canada	Chetan Baboor; India
Women's singles	Li Chunli; New Zealand	Li Jiawei; Singapore	Jing Jun Hong; Singapore
Women's singles	Li Chunli; New Zealand	Li Jiawei; Singapore	Tan Paey Fern Sharon; Singapore
Women's EAD Singles – Open Wheelchair	Sue Gilroy; England	Alette Moll; South Africa	Cathy Mitton; England
Women's EAD Singles – Open Wheelchair	Sue Gilroy; England	Alette Moll; South Africa	Joy Boyd; Australia
Men's doubles	Andrew Baggaley & Gareth Herbert; England	Adam Robertson & Ryan Jenkins; Wales	Duan Yong Jun & Zhang Tai Yong; Singapore
Men's doubles	Andrew Baggaley & Gareth Herbert; England	Adam Robertson & Ryan Jenkins; Wales	Subramaniam Raman & Chetan Baboor; India
Women's doubles	Jing Jun Hong & Li Jiawei; Singapore	Li Karen & Li Chunli; New Zealand	Tan Paey Fern Sharon, & Zhang Xue Ling; Singapore
Women's doubles	Jing Jun Hong & Li Jiawei; Singapore	Li Karen & Li Chunli; New Zealand	Lay Jian Fang & Miao Miao; Australia
Mixed doubles	Duan Yong Jun and Li Jiawei; Singapore	Brett Clarke & Lay Jian Fang; Australia	Zhang Tai Yong & Jing Jun Hong; Singapore
Mixed doubles	Duan Yong Jun and Li Jiawei; Singapore	Brett Clarke & Lay Jian Fang; Australia	Peter Jackson & Li Chunli; New Zealand
Men's Team	Alex Perry, Andrew Baggaley, Gareth Herbert, Matthew Syed, & Terry Young; England	Ayemojuba Sau, Kazeem Nosiru, Monday Merotohun, Saka Suraju & Segun Toriola; Nigeria	Cai Xiao Li, Duan Yong Jun, Leng Chih Cheng, Sen Yew Fai, & Zhang Tai Yong; Singapore
Men's Team	Alex Perry, Andrew Baggaley, Gareth Herbert, Matthew Syed, & Terry Young; England	Ayemojuba Sau, Kazeem Nosiru, Monday Merotohun, Saka Suraju & Segun Toriola; Nigeria	Chetan Baboor, Chakraborty Sourav, Roy Soumyadeep, Saha Subhajit & Subramanian Raman; India
Women's Team	Jing Junhong, Li Jiawei, Tan Paey Fern Sharon, & Zhang Xueling; Singapore	Cho Yuen-Wern, Lay Jian Fang, Miao Miao, Peri Campbell-Innes, & Tammy Gough; Australia	Li Karen, Li Chunli, Tracey McLauchlan, & Laura-Lee Smith; New Zealand
Women's Team	Jing Junhong, Li Jiawei, Tan Paey Fern Sharon, & Zhang Xueling; Singapore	Cho Yuen-Wern, Lay Jian Fang, Miao Miao, Peri Campbell-Innes, & Tammy Gough; Australia	Petra Cada, Geng Lijuan, Marie-Christine Roussy & Chris Xu; Canada

== Men's singles ==
Round of 16
(Nigeria) Segun Toriola	11	11	9	11	13
(New Zealand) Aaron Li	7	5	11	6	11
(England) Alex Perry	9	11	11	11	9	11
(Wales) Ryan Jenkins	11	9	4	9	11	7
(Singapore) Duan Yong Jun	11	11	11	11	11
(Canada) Bence Csaba	6	13	8	4	6
(England) Matthew Syed	11	14	12	11
(Nigeria) Kazeem Nosiru	2	12	10	3
(Canada) Wenguan Johnny Huang	11	11	11	11
(England) Andrew Baggaley	5	3	7	5
(Singapore) Tai Yong Zhang	12	11	6	11	9	11	11
(Nigeria) Sau Ayemojuba	10	6	11	13	11	8	9
(India) Chetan Baboor	11	11	11	8	11
(Trinidad and Tobago) Dexter St. Louis	8	8	5	11	9
(England) Gareth Herbert	9	11	13	6	11	9	11
(Scotland) Euan Walker	11	7	11	11	6	11	6

Quarter finals
(Nigeria) Toriola	11	12	11	9	13
(England) Perry	6	10	3	11	11
(Singapore) Yong Jun	11	5	6	11	11	11
(England) Syed	8	11	11	7	3	5
(Canada) Huang	11	11	11	12
(Singapore) Yong Zhang	6	7	7	10
(India) Baboor	13	11	11	4	11
(England) Herbert	11	8	6	11	8

Semi finals
(Nigeria) Toriola	11	11	6	7	11	11
(Singapore) Yong Jun (bronze)	6	7	11	11	8	9
(Canada) Huang	11	14	8	11	11
(India) Baboor (bronze)	4	12	11	7	9

Final
(Nigeria) Toriola (gold)	3	11	6	11	12	11
(Canada) Huang (silver)	11	9	11	7	10	9

== Women's singles ==
Round of 16
(New Zealand) Li Chunli	11	11	11	11
(India) Poulomi Ghatak	5	4	6	4
(Singapore) Zhang Xueling	11	11	11	11
(Canada) Marie-Christine Roussy	2	6	3	7
(Singapore) Jing Jun Hong	11	9	11	11	11
(Canada) Petra Cada	9	11	4	4	8
(Australia) Miao Miao	13	11	11	11
(Nigeria) Olufunke Oshonaike	11	7	5	4
(Singapore) Li Jiawei	11	11	11	11
(Canada) Chris Xu	8	5	8	4
(New Zealand) Karen Jinli	9	11	11	11	12	7	11
(Wales) Bethan Daunton	11	8	9	5	14	11	7
(Singapore) Tan Paey Fern	12	11	11	11	11
(India) Nandita Saha	14	9	8	4	4
(Canada) Geng Lijuan	12	11	11	11
(India) Mouma Das	10	7	5	4

Quarter finals
(New Zealand) Li Chunli	11	11	11	11	11
(Singapore) Zhang Xueling	8	5	13	8	9
(Singapore) Jing Jun Hong	9	6	11	11	11	8	11
(Australia) Miao Miao	11	11	8	7	5	11	6
(Singapore) Li Jiawei	11	11	11	11
(New Zealand) Karen Jinli	8	9	4	8
(Singapore) Tan Paey Fern	11	11	3	11	9	19
(Canada) Geng Lijuan	8	9	11	9	11	17

Semi finals
(New Zealand) Li Chunli	11	7	11	11	11
(Singapore) Jing Jun Hong	4	11	5	7	8
(Singapore) Li Jiawei	11	11	11	7	9	11
(Singapore) Tan Paey Fern	8	5	6	11	11	5

Final
(New Zealand) Li Chunli	11	11	5	11	11
(Singapore) Li Jiawei	6	9	11	5	8

== Men's doubles ==
Quarterfinals
(England) Andrew Baggaley (England) Gareth Herbert	11	12	11
(New Zealand) Peter Jackson (New Zealand) Aaron Li	8	10	8
(India) Subramaniam Raman (India) Chetan Baboor	11	11	11
(Nigeria) Segun Toriola (Nigeria) Monday Merotohun	6	6	9
(Wales) Adam Robertson (Wales) Ryan Jenkins	w/o
(Canada) Pradeeban Peter-Paul (Canada) Wenguan Johnny Huang
(Singapore) Duan Yong Jun (Singapore) Tai Yong Zhang	11	11	11
(England) Alex Perry (England) Terry Young	9	5	6

Semifinals
(England) Baggaley & Herbert	5	13	11	11	11
(India) Raman & Baboor	11	11	9	13	8
(Wales) Robertson & Jenkins	5	11	12	5	11
(Singapore) Duan & Zhang	11	5	10	11	8

Final
(England) Baggaley & Herbert	11	11	8	11	17
(Wales) Robertson & Jenkins	9	13	11	9	15

== Women's doubles ==
Quarterfinals
(Singapore) Li Jiawei (Singapore) Jing Jun Hong	11	11	2	11
(Canada) Petra Cada (Canada) Chris Xu	8	3	11	6
(Australia) Miao Miao (Australia) Lay Jian Fang	11	11	13
(India) Nagapattinam R Indu (India) Mantu Ghosh	9	6	11
(New Zealand) Karen Li (New Zealand) Li Chunli	11	11	11	11
(Australia) Yuen-Fern Cho (Australia) Tammy Gough	7	13	5	2
(Singapore) Tan Paey Fern (Singapore) Zhang Xue Ling	11	9	13	11
(Malaysia) Lee Fong Beh (Malaysia) Lee Wei Beh	9	11	11	8

Semifinals
(Singapore) Li Jiawei & Jing Jun Hong	7	9	11	11	11
(Australia) Miao Miao & Lay	11	11	5	7	9
(New Zealand) Karen Li & Li Chunli	11	11	17
(Singapore) Tan & Zhang	7	9	15

Final
(Singapore) Li Jiawei & Jing Jun Hong	11	11	10	11
(New Zealand) Karen Li & Li Chunli	3	7	12	4

== Mixed doubles ==
Quarterfinals
(Singapore) Duan Yong Jun (Singapore) Li Jiawei	11	9	14	10	11
(England) Matthew Syed (England) Katy Parker	2	11	12	12	5
(New Zealand) Peter Jackson (New Zealand) Li Chunli	11	11	11	6	11
(Wales) Ryan Jenkins (Wales) Bethan Daunton	9	4	13	11	5
(Australia) Brett Clarke (Australia) Lay Jian Fang	8	13	11	13	11
(New Zealand) Shane Laugesen (New Zealand) Karen Li	11	11	6	15	9
(Singapore) Tai Yong Zhang (Singapore) Jing Jun Hong	11	11	12
(Canada) Pradeeban Peter-Paul (Canada) Marie-Christine Roussy	3	6	10

Semifinals
(Singapore) Duan Yong Jun & Li Jiawei	11	13	11
(New Zealand) Jackson & Chunli	9	11	7
(Australia) Clarke & Lay	5	12	12	2	11
(Singapore) Zhang & Hong	11	10	10	11	9

Final
(Singapore) Jun & Li Jiawei	9	11	11	11
(Australia) Clarke & Lay	11	9	6	4

== Men's team ==
Quarter-finals
England	3
Australia	2
India	3
Canada	2
Nigeria	3
Wales	0
Singapore	3
New Zealand	0

Semi-finals
England	3
India (bronze)	1
Nigeria	3
Singapore (bronze)	1

Final
England (gold)	3
Nigeria (silver)	0

=== Gold medal match ===
30 July	ENG	3–0	NGR

	Individual matches
Matthew Syed	3–1	Monday Merotohun	11–1, 7–11, 11–4, 11–2
Gareth Herbert	3–0	Segun Toriola	11–3, 11–8, 11–5
Alex Perry	3–1	Kazeem Nosiru	11–8, 9–11, 11–5, 11–8

== Women's team ==
Quarter-finals
Singapore	3
Malaysia	0
New Zealand	3
England	1
Australia	3
India	1
Canada	3
Wales	0

Semi-finals
Singapore	3
New Zealand	2
Australia	3
Canada	2

Final
Singapore	3
Australia	0

=== Gold medal match ===
30 July	SIN	3–0	AUS

	Individual matches
Li Jiawei	3–0	Jian Fang Lay	11–2, 11–6, 11–5
Jing Junhong	3–1	Miao Miao	10–12, 11–6, 11–5, 11–8
Zhang Xueling	3–1	Tammy Gough	11–7, 11–6, 6–11, 11–4
