= Karen Li =

New Zealand table tennis player

Medal record

Women's table tennis

Representing New Zealand

Commonwealth Games
Silver medal – second place	2002 Manchester	Doubles
Bronze medal – third place	2002 Manchester	Team

Karen Li (born September 19, 1977, in Guiping, Guangxi, China) is a table tennis player for New Zealand. At the 2002 Commonwealth Games she won a silver medal partnering her sister Chunli Li in the women's doubles and a bronze medal in the team event.
