= BBC 2002 =

Temporary radio station during Commonwealth Games

England
- Broadcast area: Greater Manchester
- Frequency: 97.7 FM

Programming
- Language: English
- Format: News and Sports coverage

Ownership
- Owner: BBC Local Radio, BBC North West

Links
- Website: BBC 2002 Commonwealth Games Radio

BBC 2002 was an English radio station exclusively serving Greater Manchester for the duration of the 2002 Commonwealth Games. The station was produced by BBC North West, the region which it inhabits, and included a tight schedule of live sporting events from the games along with some local news, though sport and the culture surrounding the games were the primary focus. The radio station was accompanied by its own micro-site, entitled BBC 2002, that looked into all aspects of the preparation for and smooth running of the games.
