= Peter Jackson (table tennis) =

New Zealand table tennis player

Medal record

Men's table tennis

Representing New Zealand

Commonwealth Games
Bronze medal – third place	2002 Manchester	Mixed doubles

Peter Stuart Jackson (born 22 October 1964) is a table tennis player representative of New Zealand. He competed in three Summer Olympics and two Commonwealth Games, winning a bronze medal at 2002 Commonwealth Games.

== Career ==
Jackson was born in Papakura, New Zealand. His first Olympic participation came in 1988 in Seoul. Here, he competed in the men's doubles event, but as the team only won one match and lost six in the preliminary round, they were eliminated from the competition on an early stage. At the 1992 Summer Olympics in Barcelona, Jackson competed in both the men's doubles and singles events. In the doubles event, the team placed fourth in the group stage after losing all matches, and in the singles event, he placed third in his group after winning one match and losing two. Neither placement was good enough to advance. At the 1996 Summer Olympics in Atlanta, Georgia Jackson participated as an official.

His last Olympic participation came at the 2000 Summer Olympics in Sydney. Here he only competed in the singles event, but failed to advance after losing two matches. Then, at the 2002 Commonwealth Games he won a bronze medal in the mixed doubles event partnering Chunli Li. He also competed in the men's doubles and singles events without the same success, reaching the round of 32 in the singles and the quarterfinal in the doubles. At the 2006 Commonwealth Games he competed in both singles, doubles, mixed doubles and the team event.

Jackson stands 1.85 m (6 ft 1 in) tall, and in 2006 he weighed 76 kilograms (168 lb).
