= Toshiaki Fukuda =

Japanese field hockey player

Toshiaki Fukuda (福田 敏昭, Fukuda Toshiaki; born September 1, 1980) is a field hockey player from Japan, who finished in ninth place with the Men's National Team at the 2006 Men's Hockey World Cup in Mönchengladbach. Before the start of the tournament he played 30 international matches for his native country, according to the official players list issued by the International Field Hockey Federation (FIH) just before the start of the tournament.
