= Mitesh Patel =

New Zealand field hockey player

Personal information
- Full name: Mitesh Kishorbhai Patel
- Born: 9 May 1976 (age 49) Gujarat, India
Medal record
Men's field hockey
Representing New Zealand
Commonwealth Games
Silver medal – second place	2002 Manchester	Team competition

Mitesh Kishorbhai Patel (born 9 May 1976) is a New Zealand field hockey player, who earned his first cap for the national team, nicknamed The Black Sticks, in 1998. He is nicknamed "Meat Dish" or "Petal". Patel earned a total number of 135 caps during his career.

== International senior tournaments ==
- 1998 – Commonwealth Games
- 2000 – Sultan Azlan Shah Cup
- 2000 – Olympic Qualifying Tournament
- 2001 – World Cup Qualifying Tournament
- 2002 – World Cup
- 2002 – Commonwealth Games
- 2003 – Sultan Azlan Shah Cup
- 2003 – Champions Challenge
- 2004 – Olympic Qualifying Tournament
- 2004 – Summer Olympics
- 2004 – Champions Trophy
- 2006 – World Cup
