= Blair Hopping =

New Zealand field hockey player

Personal information
- Born: 12 August 1980 (age 45) Pukekohe, New Zealand
Medal record
Men's Field hockey
Representing New Zealand
Commonwealth Games
Silver medal – second place	2002 Manchester	Team Competition
Champions Challenge
Silver medal – second place	2007 Boom	Team Competition

Blair Robert Hopping (born 12 August 1980 in Pukekohe) is a field hockey player from New Zealand, who earned his first cap for the national team, nicknamed The Black Sticks, in 2000 against Pakistan. He competed for New Zealand at the 2004 Summer Olympics in Athens, the 2008 Summer Olympics in Beijing and the 2012 Summer Olympics in London and at the 2002 Commonwealth Games in Manchester and the 2006 Commonwealth Games in Melbourne.

Hopping taught Physical Education at Rangitoto College on Auckland's North Shore and coaches the school's 1st XI. He left that to join TigerTurf, New Zealand's only Synthetic Sports Surface manufacturer, on a part-time basis in 2006 and full-time since 2011. After retiring from Hockey, Blair now helps to upgrade and build new Hockey surfaces in New Zealand.

== International senior tournaments ==
- 2001 – World Cup Qualifier
- 2002 – World Cup
- 2002 – Commonwealth Games
- 2003 – Sultan Azlan Shah Cup
- 2003 – Champions Challenge
- 2004 – Olympic Qualifying Tournament
- 2004 – Olympic Games
- 2004 – Champions Trophy
- 2005 – Sultan Azlan Shah Cup
- 2006 – Commonwealth Games
- 2006 – Hockey World Cup
- 2007 – Champions Challenge
- 2008 – Olympic Games
- 2012 – Olympic Games
