= Chetan Baboor =

Indian table tennis player

Personal information
- Full name: Chetan Panduranga Baboor
- Nationality: Indian
- Born: 22 April 1974 (age 52) Lucknow, Uttar Pradesh, India
- Height: 188 cm (6 ft 2 in)
- Weight: 70 kg (154 lb)

Sport
- Sport: Table tennis
Medal record
Men's table tennis
Representing India
Commonwealth Games
Bronze medal – third place	2002 Manchester	Men's singles
Bronze medal – third place	2002 Manchester	Men's doubles
Bronze medal – third place	2002 Manchester	Men's team
Asian Cup
Silver medal – second place	1997 Pune	Men's singles
Bronze medal – third place	2000 Mumbai	Men's singles

Chetan Baboor (born 22 April 1974) is an Indian international table tennis champion and winner of the Arjuna Award for 1997 - an award recognizing outstanding achievement in sports in India. He belongs to the Babbur Kamme community of Holenarasipura, Karnataka. Chetan has won four national titles and double golds in Commonwealth Championships. He also competed at the three Olympic Games.

He was born in Lucknow, India and has represented Karnataka, Tamil Nadu and Petroleum Sports Control Board teams in India as well as BTK Enig in Sweden. Apart from his sporting achievements, he has a Mechanical Engineering degree from Rashtreeya Vidyalaya College of Engineering and an MBA from Thunderbird School of Global Management.

He stopped playing pro tour in 2001 (at the age of 27) in order to pursue an MBA from Thunderbird University and has been working in Business/Management consulting since. He had a career best world ranking of 68 in 1999 and played his last big event (World Championships) in 2004.

He currently resides in Bangalore and New York City, and is currently a presenter for the Asian Games, presenting for the TV channel Ten Sports. He is currently working at Axtria Inc. as a principal.
