= 2006 Men's Hockey World Cup =

11th edition of the Hockey World Cup

2006 Hockey World Cup
Hockey Weltmeisterschaften 2006
- Official logo

Tournament details
- Host country: Germany
- City: Mönchengladbach
- Dates: 6 – 17 September 2006
- Teams: 12 (from 5 confederations)
- Venue: Warsteiner HockeyPark

Final positions
- Champions: Germany (2nd title)
- Runner-up: Australia
- Third place: Spain

Tournament statistics
- Matches played: 42
- Goals scored: 174 (4.14 per match)
- Top scorer: (Netherlands) Taeke Taekema (11 goals)
- Best player: (Australia) Jamie Dwyer

The 2006 Men's Hockey World Cup was the 11th edition of the Hockey World Cup men's field hockey tournament. It was held 6–17 September 2006 in Mönchengladbach, Germany.

Germany won the tournament for second consecutive time after defeating Australia 4–3 in the final. Spain won the third place match by defeating Korea 3–2 with a golden goal.

== Qualification ==
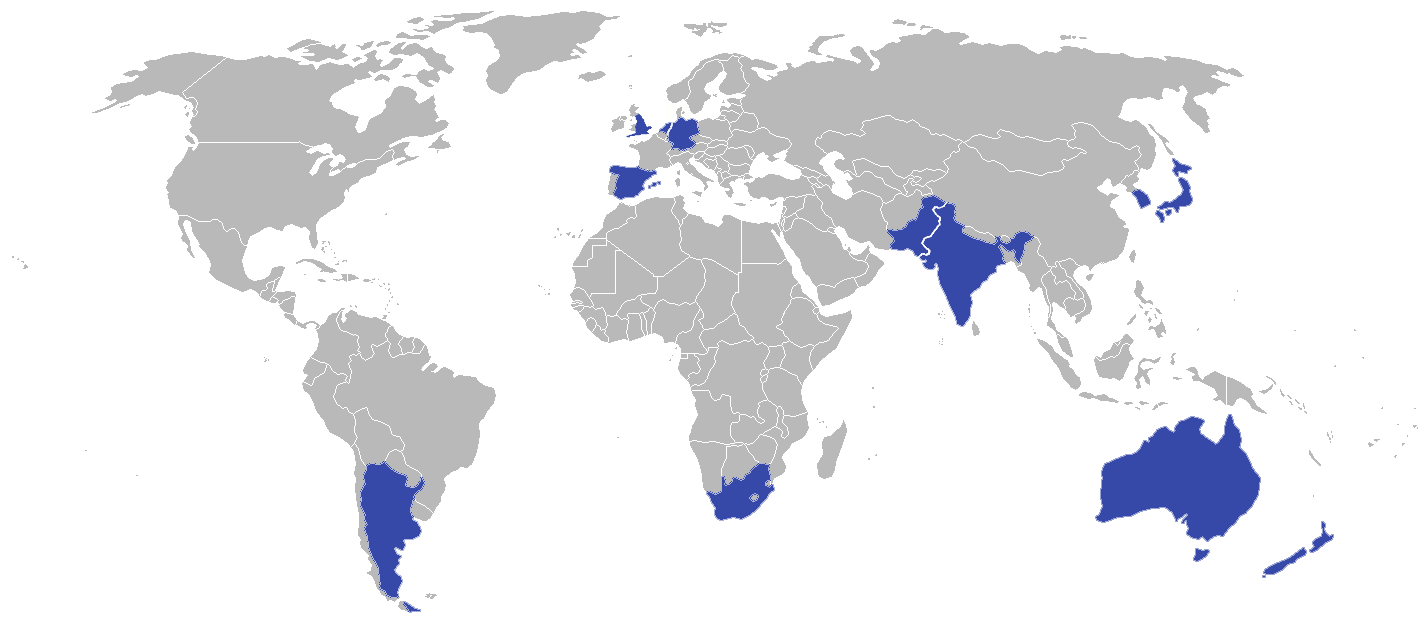
Participating nations

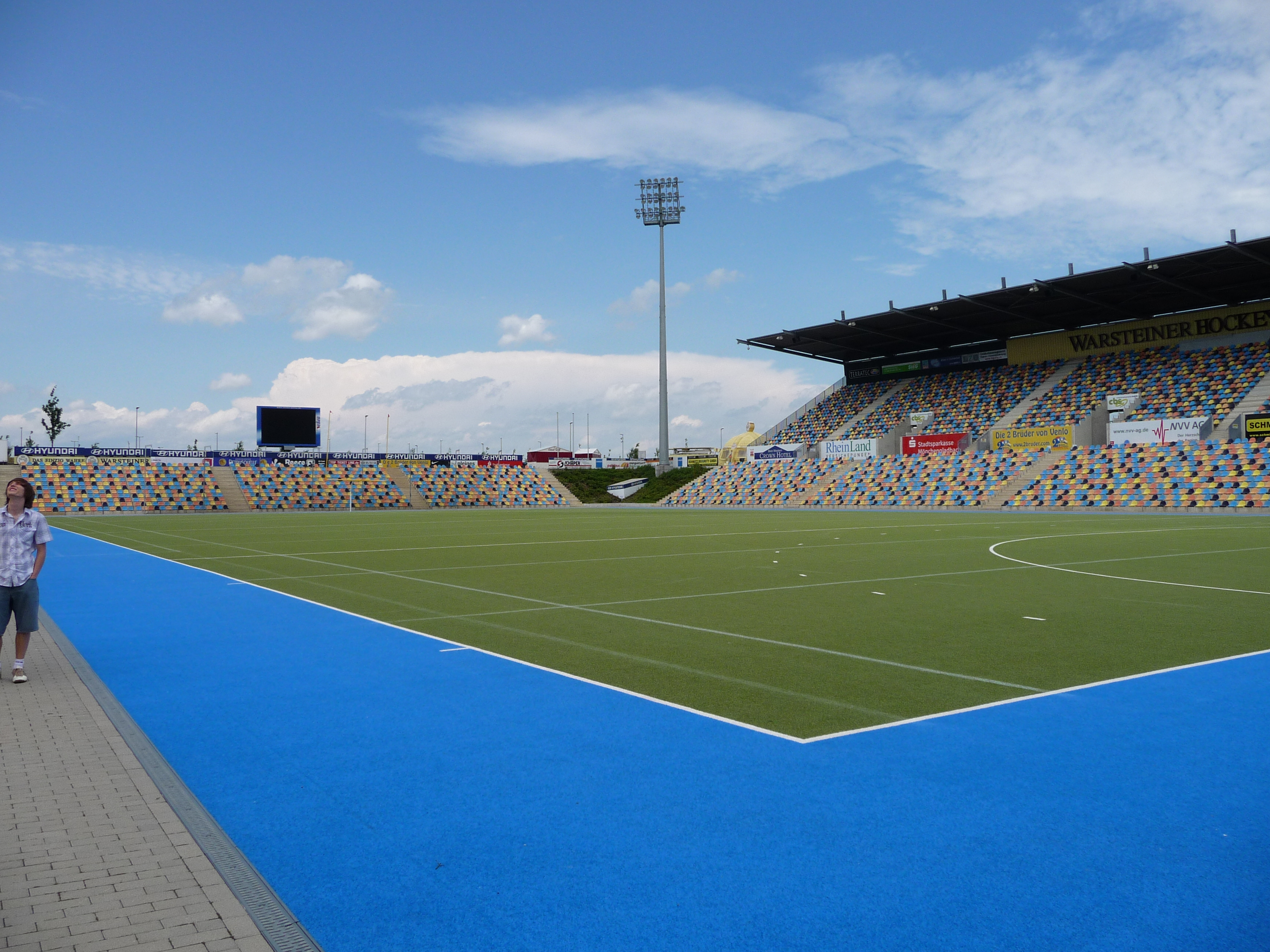
The venue which hosted the second semi-final match between Germany and Spain

Each of the continental champions from five confederations and the host nation received an automatic berth. The European confederation received one extra quota based upon the FIH World Rankings. Alongside the five teams qualifying through the Qualifier, twelve teams competed in this tournament.

Dates	Event	Location	Quotas	Qualifier(s)
Host nation			1	Germany
21–28 September 2003	2003 Hockey Asia Cup	Kuala Lumpur, Malaysia	1	India
12–23 May 2004	2004 Pan American Cup	London, Canada	1	Argentina
28 August–4 September 2005	2005 EuroHockey Nations Championship	Leipzig, Germany	2	Spain; Netherlands
1–8 October 2005	2005 Hockey African Cup for Nations	Pretoria, South Africa	1	South Africa
15–19 November 2005	2005 Oceania Cup	Suva, Fiji	1	Australia
12–23 April 2006	Intercontinental Cup	Changzhou, China	5	New Zealand; South Korea; England; Pakistan; Japan
Total			12	

== Umpires ==
The International Hockey Federation appointed 14 umpires for this tournament:

- Xavier Adell (ESP)
- Christian Blasch (GER)
- Henrik Ehlers (DEN)
- David Gentles (AUS)
- Murray Grime (AUS)
- Hamish Jamson (ENG)
- Kim Hong-lae (KOR)
- Satinder Kumar (IND)
- David Leiper (SCO)
- Andy Mair (SCO)
- Sumesh Putra (CAN)
- Amarjit Singh (MAS)
- Rob ten Cate (NED)
- John Wright (RSA)

== Results ==
All times are Central European Summer Time (UTC+02:00)

=== Pool A ===
Pos	Team	Pld	W	D	L	GF	GA	GD	Pts	Qualification
1	Australia	5	4	0	1	18	5	+13	12	Semi-finals
2	Spain	5	3	2	0	13	7	+6	11	Semi-finals
3	New Zealand	5	2	1	2	10	14	−4	7	
4	Pakistan	5	1	2	2	10	10	0	5	
5	Argentina	5	1	1	3	5	12	−7	4	
6	Japan	5	1	0	4	7	15	−8	3	

Source: FIH

6 September 2006
18:30

Argentina	0–3	New Zealand
	Report	Shaw 17', 23'; Child 37'

Umpires:
Henrik Ehlers (DEN)
Rob ten Cate (NED)

7 September 2006
16:00

Pakistan	4–0	Japan
Abbas 9', 64'; Butt 12'; Abbasi 68'	Report

Umpires:
Xavier Adell (ESP)
Hamish Jamson (ENG)

7 September 2006
18:00

Australia	1–3	Spain
Elder 47'	Report	Tubau 8'; Amat 21'; Ribas 41'

Umpires:
Christian Blasch (GER)
John Wright (RSA)

8 September 2006
16:00

New Zealand	4–4	Pakistan
Couzins 14', 36'; Hopping 18'; Shaw 53'	Report	Abbasi 9'; Zubair 21', 65'; Butt 42'

Umpires:
David Leiper (SCO)
Amarjit Singh (MAS)

8 September 2006
20:15

Spain	1–1	Argentina
Tubau 39'	Report	Cammareri 50'

Umpires:
David Gentles (AUS)
Rob ten Cate (NED)

9 September 2006
17:30

Japan	0–1	New Zealand
	Report	Child 43'

Umpires:
John Wright (RSA)
Kim Hong-lae (KOR)

9 September 2006
19:30

Argentina	0–4	Australia
	Report	Doerner 23'; Ford 24'; McCann 30'; Hammond 55'

Umpires:
Andy Mair (SCO)
Satinder Kumar (IND)

10 September 2006
12:30

Pakistan	2–2	Spain
Butt 10'; Abbas 52'	Report	Freixa 27'; Amat 41'

Umpires:
Sumesh Putra (CAN)
Henrik Ehlers (DEN)

10 September 2006
19:00

Australia	3–1	Japan
McCann 6'; Elder 8'; Ford 54'	Report	Fukuda 16'

Umpires:
Amarjit Singh (MAS)
Rob ten Cate (NED)

11 September 2006
14:00

Spain	3–1	New Zealand
Alegre 10'; Freixa 19'; Tubau 36'	Report	Shaw 40'

Umpires:
Murray Grime (AUS)
Christian Blasch (GER)

11 September 2006
18:00

Argentina	1–0	Pakistan
M. Vila 41'	Report

Umpires:
Rob ten Cate (NED)
Kim Hong-lae (KOR)

12 September 2006
14:00

New Zealand	1–7	Australia
Patel 20'	Report	Dwyer 2', 64'; McCann 26'; Elder 32'; Naylor 48'; Brooks 55'; Doerner 66'

Umpires:
John Wright (RSA)
Amarjit Singh (MAS)

12 September 2006
16:00

Japan	4–3	Argentina
A. Ito 7', 69'; Ozawa 44'; Sakamoto 61'	Report	R. Vila 32', 35'; Cammareri 47'

Umpires:
Hamish Jamson (ENG)
Satinder Kumar (IND)

13 September 2006
14:00

Japan	2–4	Spain
Katayama 15', 49'	Report	Amat 22'; Freixa 44', 58', 66'

Umpires:
David Gentles (AUS)
Andy Mair (SCO)

13 September 2006
20:30

Australia	3–0	Pakistan
George 14', 51'; Dwyer 32'	Report

Umpires:
Christian Blasch (GER)
Kim Hong-lae (KOR)

=== Pool B ===
Pos	Team	Pld	W	D	L	GF	GA	GD	Pts	Qualification
1	Germany (H)	5	3	2	0	12	5	+7	11	Semi-finals
2	South Korea	5	3	2	0	8	5	+3	11	Semi-finals
3	Netherlands	5	3	1	1	16	9	+7	10	
4	England	5	2	0	3	10	10	0	6	
5	South Africa	5	0	2	3	4	13	−9	2	
6	India	5	0	1	4	7	15	−8	1	

Source: FIH
(H) Hosts

6 September 2006
15:30

Germany	3–2	India
C. Zeller 27', 70'; Hentschel 59'	Report	S. Singh 57', 64'

Umpires:
David Leiper (SCO)
Sumesh Putra (CAN)

6 September 2006
20:30

South Korea	3–2	Netherlands
You 12', 15'; Seo 59'	Report	R. Brouwer 48'; Taekema 53'

Umpires:
David Gentles (AUS)
Amarjit Singh (MAS)

7 September 2006
14:00

India	2–3	England
S. Singh 28'; D. Tirkey 66'	Report	Tindall 53'; S. Mantell 57', 61'

Umpires:
Murray Grime (AUS)
Kim Hong-lae (KOR)

7 September 2006
20:15

Netherlands	2–0	South Africa
Taekema 16'; Derikx 65'	Report

Umpires:
Andy Mair (SCO)
Satinder Kumar (IND)

8 September 2006
18:00

England	0–1	South Korea
	Report	Yoon 59'

Umpires:
Henrik Ehlers (DEN)
Sumesh Putra (CAN)

9 September 2006
13:00

South Africa	1–1	India
Symons 64'	Report	I. Tirkey 14'

Umpires:
Christian Blasch (GER)
Hamish Jamson (ENG)

9 September 2006
15:15

Germany	2–2	Netherlands
C. Zeller 48'; Fürste 54'	Report	M. Brouwer 37'; Reckers 42'

Umpires:
Murray Grime (AUS)
Xavier Adell (ESP)

10 September 2006
14:45

England	1–2	Germany
S. Mantell 34'	Report	C. Zeller 24', 42'

Umpires:
David Gentles (AUS)
John Wright (RSA)

10 September 2006
17:00

South Korea	2–2	South Africa
Jang 21'; You 50'	Report	Tsolekile 49'; Madsen 59'

Umpires:
David Leiper (SCO)
Christian Blasch (GER)

11 September 2006
16:00

India	1–2	South Korea
S. Singh 46'	Report	Jang 63', 69'

Umpires:
Xavier Adell (ESP)
Sumesh Putra (CAN)

11 September 2006
20:15

Netherlands	4–3	England
De Nooijer 19'; R. Brouwer 21'; Taekema 45', 63'	Report	Daly 10'; R. Mantell 14'; Tindall 39'

Umpires:
Satinder Kumar (IND)
Henrik Ehlers (DEN)

12 September 2006
18:00

Germany	5–0	South Africa
C. Zeller 5'; Witthaus 32', 66'; Hentschel 64'; Biederlack 69'	Report

Umpires:
David Leiper (SCO)
Rob ten Cate (NED)

12 September 2006
20:00

India	1–6	Netherlands
D. Tirkey 14'	Report	Taekema 13', 15', 26', 30', 65'; Weusthof 59'

Umpires:
Andy Mair (SCO)
David Gentles (AUS)

13 September 2006
16:20

South Korea	0–0	Germany
	Report

Umpires:
John Wright (RSA)
Henrik Ehlers (DEN)

13 September 2006
18:30

South Africa	1–3	England
Symons 10'	Report	Tindall 21'; R. Mantell 42', 50'

Umpires:
Murray Grime (AUS)
Sumesh Putra (CAN)

=== Ninth to twelfth place classification ===
Crossover
16 September
South Africa	2
Japan	5
16 September
Argentina	3
India	2

Ninth place
17 September
Japan	2
Argentina	1
Eleventh place
17 September
South Africa	0
India	1

==== Crossover ====
16 September 2006
10:00

South Africa	2–5	Japan
Symons 37', 58'	Report	Yoshida 7'; A. Ito 25'; Fukuda 47', 67'; M. Ito 61'

Umpires:
Xavier Adell (ESP)
Sumesh Putra (CAN)

16 September 2006
12:30

Argentina	3–2	India
M. Vila 41', 62'; Paredes 51'	Report	Halappa 3'; R. Singh 54'

Umpires:
David Leiper (SCO)
Hamish Jamson (ENG)

==== Eleventh and twelfth place ====
17 September 2006
08:00

South Africa	0–1	India
	Report	R. Singh 54'

Umpires:
Murray Grime (AUS)
Sumesh Putra (CAN)

==== Ninth and tenth place ====
17 September 2006
10:30

Japan	2–1	Argentina
Yoshida 37'; A. Ito 69'	Report	R. Vila 56'

Umpires:
Satinder Kumar (IND)
Christian Blasch (GER)

=== Fifth to eighth place classification ===
Crossover
15 September
New Zealand	3
England	4
15 September
Netherlands	2
Pakistan	3

Fifth place
16 September
England	1
Pakistan	0
Seventh place
16 September
New Zealand	0
Netherlands	3

==== Crossover ====
15 September 2006
12:30

New Zealand	3–4	England
Shaw 29'; Archibald 33'; Child 54'	Report	S. Mantell 35+', 60'; Kirkham 46'; Tindall 70'

Umpires:
Murray Grime (AUS)
Amarjit Singh (MAS)
Xavier Adell (ESP)+
Replaced Amarjit Singh after 35 minutes

15 September 2006
15:00

Netherlands	2–3	Pakistan
Reckers 42'; Taekema 47'	Report	Abbasi 10'; Abbas 33'; Zubair 36'

Umpires:
David Leiper (SCO)
Kim Hong-lae (KOR)

==== Seventh and eighth place ====
16 September 2006
15:00

New Zealand	0–3	Netherlands
	Report	Weusthof 34', 49'; Taekema 40'

Umpires:
Andy Mair (SCO)
Satinder Kumar (IND)

==== Fifth and sixth place ====
16 September 2006
17:30

England	1–0	Pakistan
Jones 67'	Report

Umpires:
Rob ten Cate (NED)
Kim Hong-lae (KOR)

=== First to fourth place classification ===
Semi-finals
15 September
Australia	4
South Korea	2
15 September
Germany (p.s.o.)	2 (3)
Spain	2 (1)

Final
17 September
Australia	3
Germany	4
Third place
17 September
South Korea	2
Spain (a.e.t.)	3

==== Semi-finals ====
15 September 2006
17:30

Australia	4–2	South Korea
George 38'; Brooks 51'; Dwyer 60'; McCann 70'	Report	Jang 31'; Kang 41'

Umpires:
Christian Blasch (GER)
Henrik Ehlers (DEN)

15 September 2006
20:15

Germany	2–2 (a.e.t.)	Spain
Emmerling 19'; Fürste 46'	Report	Freixa 27'; Fàbregas 47'
Penalties
C. Zeller (penalty shoot-out scored); Weß (penalty shoot-out scored); Fürste (penalty shoot-out missed); P. Zeller (penalty shoot-out scored)	3–1	(penalty shoot-out missed) Freixa; (penalty shoot-out missed) Quemada; (penalty shoot-out scored) Tubau; (penalty shoot-out missed) Amat

Umpires:
David Gentles (AUS)
John Wright (RSA)

==== Third and fourth place ====
17 September 2006
13:00

South Korea	2–3 (a.e.t.)	Spain
Jang 42'; Seo 60'	Report	Tubau 9'; Freixa 40'; Amat 71'

Umpires:
David Gentles (AUS)
David Leiper (SCO)

==== Final ====
17 September 2006
15:30

Australia	3–4	Germany
Knowles 19'; Naylor 25'; Elder 38'	Report	C. Zeller 18', 54'; Fürste 46'; Emmerling 49'

Umpires:
John Wright (RSA)
Henrik Ehlers (DEN)

== Awards ==
Player of the Tournament	Top Goalscorer	Goalkeeper of the Tournament	Young Player of the Tournament	Fair Play Trophy
(Australia) Jamie Dwyer	(Netherlands) Taeke Taekema	(Germany) Ulrich Bubolz	(Germany) Christopher Zeller	New Zealand

== Statistics ==
=== Final standings ===
Pos	Grp	Team	Pld	W	D	L	GF	GA	GD	Pts	Final result
1	B	Germany (H)	7	4	3	0	18	10	+8	15	Gold medal
2	A	Australia	7	5	0	2	25	11	+14	15	Silver medal
3	A	Spain	7	4	3	0	18	11	+7	15	Bronze medal
4	B	South Korea	7	3	2	2	12	12	0	11	Fourth place
5	B	England	7	4	0	3	15	13	+2	12	Eliminated in group stage
6	A	Pakistan	7	2	2	3	13	13	0	8	Eliminated in group stage
7	B	Netherlands	7	4	1	2	21	12	+9	13	Eliminated in group stage
8	A	New Zealand	7	2	1	4	13	21	−8	7	Eliminated in group stage
9	A	Japan	7	3	0	4	14	18	−4	9	Eliminated in group stage
10	A	Argentina	7	2	1	4	9	16	−7	7	Eliminated in group stage
11	B	India	7	1	1	5	10	18	−8	4	Eliminated in group stage
12	B	South Africa	7	0	2	5	6	19	−13	2	Eliminated in group stage

Source: FIH
(H) Hosts

=== Goalscorers ===
There were 174 goals scored in 42 matches, for an average of 4.14 goals per match.

11 goals

- (Netherlands) Taeke Taekema

8 goals

- (Germany) Christopher Zeller

7 goals

- (Spain) Santiago Freixa

5 goals

- (England) Simon Mantell
- (New Zealand) Hayden Shaw
- (South Korea) Jang Jong-hyun

4 goals

- (Australia) Jamie Dwyer
- (Australia) Troy Elder
- (Australia) Michael McCann
- (England) James Tindall
- (India) Shivendra Singh
- (Japan) Akira Ito
- (Pakistan) Sohail Abbas
- (South Africa) Ian Symons
- (Spain) Pol Amat
- (Spain) Eduard Tubau

3 goals

- (Argentina) Matías Vila
- (Argentina) Rodrigo Vila
- (Australia) Bevan George
- (England) Richard Mantell
- (Germany) Moritz Fürste
- (Japan) Toshiaki Fukuda
- (Netherlands) Roderick Weusthof
- (New Zealand) Simon Child
- (Pakistan) Shakeel Abbasi
- (Pakistan) Rehan Butt
- (Pakistan) Muhammad Zubair
- (South Korea) You Hyo-sik

2 goals

- (Argentina) Lucas Cammareri
- (Australia) Travis Brooks
- (Australia) Luke Doerner
- (Australia) Russell Ford
- (Australia) Matthew Naylor
- (Germany) Björn Emmerling
- (Germany) Oliver Hentschel
- (Germany) Matthias Witthaus
- (India) Dilip Tirkey
- (India) Rajpal Singh
- (Japan) Kenichi Katayama
- (Japan) Kazuo Yoshida
- (Netherlands) Ronald Brouwer
- (Netherlands) Rob Reckers
- (New Zealand) Dean Couzins
- (South Korea) Seo Jong-ho

1 goal

- (Argentina) Matías Paredes
- (Australia) Robert Hammond
- (Australia) Mark Knowles
- (England) Matthew Daly
- (England) Martin Jones
- (England) Glenn Kirkham
- (Germany) Sebastian Biederlack
- (India) Arjun Halappa
- (India) Ignace Tirkey
- (Japan) Mitsuru Ito
- (Japan) Kazuyuki Ozawa
- (Japan) Hiroki Sakamoto
- (Netherlands) Matthijs Brouwer
- (Netherlands) Geert-Jan Derikx
- (Netherlands) Teun de Nooijer
- (New Zealand) Ryan Archibald
- (New Zealand) Blair Hopping
- (New Zealand) Mitesh Patel
- (South Africa) Wayne Madsen
- (South Africa) Lungile Tsolekile
- (South Korea) Kang Seong-jung
- (South Korea) Yoon Sung-hoon
- (Spain) David Alegre
- (Spain) Alex Fàbregas
- (Spain) Xavier Ribas

Source: FIH
