= Mauritius at the 2002 Commonwealth Games =

Sporting event delegation

Flag of Mauritius

Mauritius competed in their eleventh Commonwealth Games in 2002 sending both male and female athletes to compete in athletics, badminton, boxing, judo, swimming, table tennis and weightlifting. The nation gained their only medal in 100 kg men's judo, a bronze. This was a decrease on Kuala Lumpur 1998 when it won a gold a silver and two bronze.

	Gold	Silver	Bronze	Total
Mauritius	0	0	1	1

== Bronze ==
Judo:

(bronze) Antonio Felicite Men's Judo - 100 kg class
