= Turks and Caicos Islands at the 2002 Commonwealth Games =

Sporting event delegation

Flag of Turks & Caicos

Turks & Caicos attended the 2002 Commonwealth Games in Manchester. It was their fourth time at the Games. The nation sent just four male athletes to the Games, to compete in Athletics. They were:

Dwenney Musgrove, Men's 100 Meters
David Lightbourne, Men's 200 Meters and Men's Long Jump
Reonardo Harvey, Men's 400 Meters
Elvis Smith, Men's Javelin

These four athletes failed to win any medals.

== Medals ==
	Gold	Silver	Bronze	Total
Turks and Caicos Islands	0	0	0	0
