= Bangladesh at the 2002 Commonwealth Games =

Sporting event delegation

Flag of Bangladesh

Bangladesh competed in their fourth Commonwealth Games in 2002 sending male athletes in athletics and swimming and a mixed team in shooting. It won a gold medal in shooting, its first medal since Auckland 1990, when it won a gold and a bronze in shooting.

== Medals ==
	Gold	Silver	Bronze	Total
Bangladesh	1	0	0	1

== Gold ==
Shooting:

(gold) Asif Hossain Khan Men's Air Rifle
