= Peter Stafford (field hockey) =

New Zealand field hockey player

Personal information
- Born: 30 May 1978 (age 48)
Medal record
Men's field hockey
Representing New Zealand
Commonwealth Games
Silver medal – second place	2002 Manchester	Team competition

Peter Stafford (born 30 May 1978 in Christchurch, New Zealand) is a field hockey player from New Zealand. He won the silver medal at the 2002 Commonwealth Games in the men's team competition.
