= Brett Clarke (table tennis) =

Australian table tennis player

Brett Clarke (born 27 October 1972) is an Australian Olympic table tennis player from Melbourne. He won the silver medal at the 2002 Manchester Commonwealth Games in the Mixed Doubles event.

He was appointed as head coach of the Australian men's table tennis team in 2017.
