= Niue at the 2002 Commonwealth Games =

Sporting event delegation

Flag of Niue Island

Niue was represented at the 2002 Commonwealth Games by Niue Island Association & National Olympic Committee and abbreviated NIU.

The 2002 Commonwealth Games in Manchester, England was the first participation in the Games for the island of Niue. They entered athletes in Boxing, Athletics and Rugby Sevens, but took home no medals. Boxer Star Tauasi made it to the quarter-finals in the superheavyweight category, but was defeated by England's David Dolan.

Organized sport on Niue was a fairly recent development. Prior to their entry, Niue had also entered both the Oceania Games and South Pacific Games.

A precedent was set in June, 2001 when the island's first professional men's rugby team lost to Cook Islands 28–8. Almost all of the island's 1700 residents turned out to watch.
