= Gareth Herbert =

British table tennis player

Personal information
- Nationality: England
- Born: 20 November 1980 (age 44)

Gareth Herbert is a male former international table tennis player from England.

== Table tennis career ==
He represented England at two World Table Tennis Championships in the Swaythling Cup (men's team event) from 2000-2001.

He won a gold medal at the 2002 Commonwealth Games in the doubles with Andrew Baggaley. He also won three English National Table Tennis Championships titles.

== Style of play ==
A forehand-oriented player, Herbert was notable for his skill as a server.

== See also ==
- List of England players at the World Team Table Tennis Championships
