= Ghana at the 2002 Commonwealth Games =

- CG code: GHA
- CGA: Ghana Olympic Committee

in Manchester, England
- Medals Ranked =33rd: Gold 0 Silver 0 Bronze 1 Total 1

Commonwealth Games appearances (overview)
- 1954; 1958; 1962; 1966; 1970; 1974; 1978; 1982; 1986; 1990; 1994; 1998; 2002; 2006; 2010; 2014; 2018; 2022; 2026; 2030

Ghana competed at their twelfth games in Manchester sending 22 athletes in mixed teams in athletics, badminton and weightlifting and sent all male teams to compete in boxing and judo. Despite this strong team, the only medal won was a bronze in the Women's Heptathlon. A poor showing by Ghana's high standards of the past.

== Medals ==
	Gold	Silver	Bronze	Total
Ghana	0	0	1	1

== Bronze ==
Athletics:

(bronze) Margaret Simpson — Women's Heptathlon
