= Tracey McLauchlan =

New Zealand table tennis player

Medal record

Representing New Zealand

Women's table tennis

Commonwealth Games
Bronze medal – third place	2002 Manchester	Team

Tracey McLauchlan (born 18 August 1979 in Oxford) is a table tennis player for New Zealand. At the 2002 Commonwealth Games she won a bronze medal in the women's team event. In 1996 she was awarded the Junior Player of the Year by Table Tennis New Zealand.
