= Table tennis at the Commonwealth Games =

Table tennis competition has been in the Commonwealth Games since 2002, with singles and doubles events for both men and women. Wheelchair play is an optional event for elite athletes with a disability (EAD) since the inclusion of Para-Sports in 2002.

== Editions ==
Games	Year	Host city	Host country	Best nation
XVII	2002	Manchester	England	Singapore
XVIII	2006	Melbourne, Victoria	Australia	Singapore
XIX	2010	Delhi	India	Singapore
XX	2014	Glasgow	Scotland	Singapore
XXI	2018	Gold Coast, Queensland	Australia	India
XXII	2022	Birmingham	England	India

== Events ==
Event	02	06	10	14	18
Men's singles	•	•	•	•	•
Men's doubles	•	•	•	•	•
Men's team	•	•	•	•	•
Women's singles	•	•	•	•	•
Women's doubles	•	•	•	•	•
Women's team	•	•	•	•	•
Mixed doubles	•	•	•	•	•
Men's TT6–10 singles					•
Women's TT6–10 singles					•
Women's EAD singles (Wheelchair)	•	•	•		
Events	8	8	8	7	9

== All-time medal table ==
Updated after the 2022 Commonwealth Games

Rank	Nation	Gold	Silver	Bronze	Total
1	Singapore (SIN)	25	16	16	57
2	India (IND)	10	5	12	27
3	England (ENG)	9	7	10	26
4	Nigeria (NGR)	3	7	6	16
5	Australia (AUS)	2	9	7	18
6	New Zealand (NZL)	1	1	2	4
6	Wales (WAL)	1	1	2	4
8	Malaysia (MAS)	0	3	2	5
9	Canada (CAN)	0	1	2	3
10	South Africa (SAF)	0	1	0	1
Totals (10 entries)		51	51	59	161

Note: Two bronze medals were awarded in the eight medal events in the 2002 Commonwealth Games.
