= Chunli Li =

New Zealand table tennis player

Chunli Li MNZM
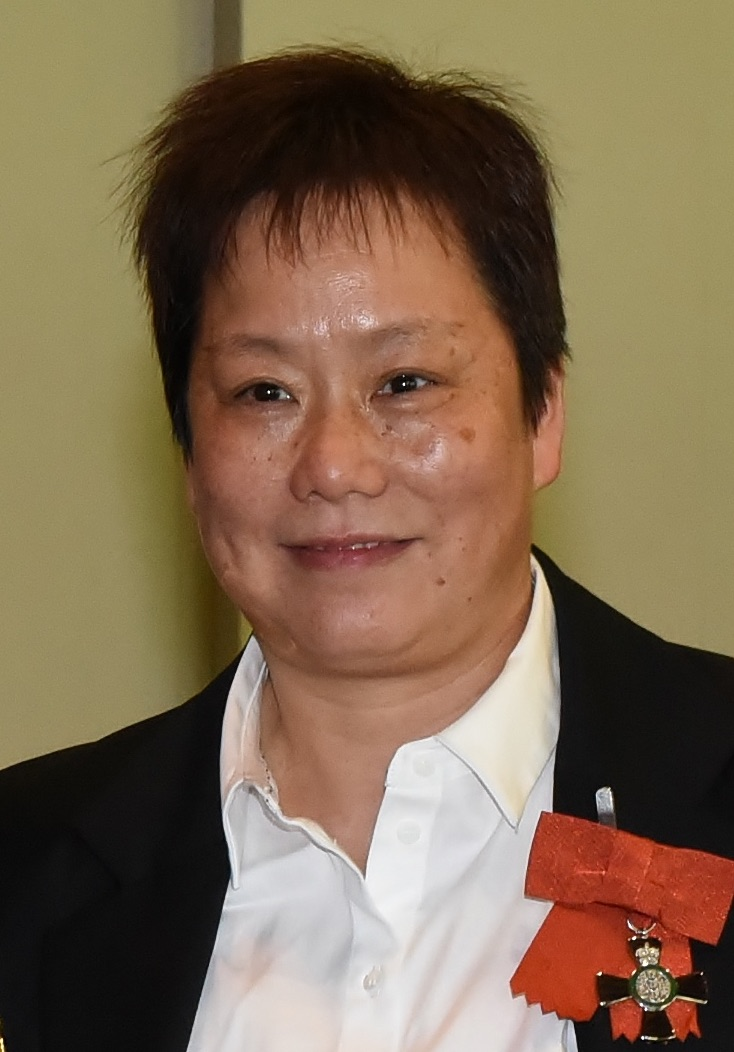
- Li in 2017

Personal information
- Born: 28 February 1962 (age 64) Guiping, China

Sport
- Country: New Zealand
- Sport: Table tennis
Medal record
Women's table tennis
Representing New Zealand
World Cup
Bronze medal – third place	1997 Shanghai	Singles
Commonwealth Games
Gold medal – first place	2002 Manchester	Singles
Silver medal – second place	2002 Manchester	Doubles
Bronze medal – third place	2002 Manchester	Mixed Doubles
Bronze medal – third place	2002 Manchester	Team

Chunli Li MNZM (simplified Chinese: 李春丽; traditional Chinese: 李春麗; pinyin: Lǐ Chūnlì; born 28 February 1962) is a Chinese-born New Zealand female professional table tennis player. She won a gold, silver and two bronze medals at the 2002 Commonwealth Games to cap off her long career.

Li was born in Guiping, Guigang, Guangxi in 1962. She became one of the top table tennis players in China, specialising as a doubles player. Li migrated to New Zealand in 1987 and subsequently represented New Zealand until she retired in 2004 to concentrate as the national coach. She competed at four Olympic Games and one Commonwealth Games for New Zealand. Since 2011, she came out of her "retirement" and started representing New Zealand again. Li led the New Zealand team at the 2014 Commonwealth Games in Glasgow.

In the 2017 New Year Honours, Li was appointed a Member of the New Zealand Order of Merit, for services to table tennis.

In 2025, at the age of 63, she competed in the Table Tennis World Cup, 28 years after she won bronze in the women's singles event in 1997. In her group, she played Suh Hyo-won and Lily Zhang, losing both matches 4-0
