= Marie-Christine Roussy =

Canadian table tennis player

Personal information
- Born: 1 March 1983 (age 42); Repentigny, Quebec, Canada

Sport
- Sport: Table tennis

Marie-Christine Roussy (born 1 March 1983) is a Canadian table tennis player. She competed at the 2000 Summer Olympics and the 2004 Summer Olympics.
