= Laura-Lee Smith =

New Zealand table tennis player

Medal record

Representing New Zealand

Women's table tennis

Commonwealth Games
Bronze medal – third place	2002 Manchester	Team

Laura-Lee Smith (born 21 November 1978 in Christchurch, New Zealand) is a table tennis player for New Zealand. At the 2002 Commonwealth Games she won a bronze medal in the women's team event.
