= 2002 Commonwealth Games =

Multi-sport event in Manchester, England

XVII Commonwealth Games
- Host city: Manchester, England
- Motto: The Spirit of Friendship
- Nations: 72
- Athletes: 3,863
- Events: 281 in 17 sports
- Opening: 25 July 2002
- Closing: 4 August 2002
- Opened by: Elizabeth II
- Closed by: Elizabeth II
- Athlete's Oath: James Hickman
- Queen's Baton Final Runners: David Beckham and Kirsty Howard
- Anthem: Where My Heart Will Take Me by Russell Watson
- Main venue: City of Manchester Stadium

The 2002 Commonwealth Games, officially known as the XVII Commonwealth Games and commonly known as Manchester 2002, were an international multi-sport event for the members of the Commonwealth held in Manchester, England, from 25 July to 4 August 2002. According to planning, this event was to be held in a country in the United Kingdom as part of the Golden Jubilee of Elizabeth II, head of the Commonwealth. England was the only bidder for the event and, in an internal process, Manchester was selected for the 2002 Games ahead of London. The Manchester bid used projects which were part of the failed bid for the 2000 Summer Olympics and Paralympics, which were awarded to Sydney, Australia. The 2002 Commonwealth Games was, prior to the 2012 Summer Olympics, the largest multi-sport event ever to be held in the UK, eclipsing the London 1948 Summer Olympics in terms of teams and athletes participating. The 2002 Commonwealth Games had the largest number of events of any Commonwealth Games in history, featuring 281 events across 17 sports.

The event was considered a success for the host city, providing an opportunity to display how Manchester reeinvented itself as city, following the 1996 IRA bombing. The Games formed the main catalyst for the widespread regeneration and heavy development of Manchester and bolstered its reputation as a European and global city internationally. Rapid economic development and continued urban regeneration of the now post-industrial Manchester continued after the Games, which helped cement its place as one of the principal cultural cities in the United Kingdom.

The opening and closing ceremonies, the athletics, and the rugby sevens events were held at the City of Manchester Stadium, which was purpose-built for the Games. Unusually for a Commonwealth Games, the only sport that was held outside the host city was shooting, which was held in the National Shooting Centre in Bisley, Surrey, some 200 miles (322 km) from Manchester. Seventy-two associations competed in 14 individual sports and 3 team sports events.

Sporting legacy includes the British Cycling team, which inherited the Manchester Velodrome and went on to win eight gold medals at the 2008 Olympics and another eight gold medals at the 2012 Olympics, partly attributed to the availability of the velodrome. The stadium was leased long-term to Manchester City F.C., which saw a conversion to a football-specific stadium, and as a result, they have since found themselves in a desirable investment opportunity in the age of foreign football investment. The club was taken over by the Abu Dhabi United Group led by Sheikh Mansour in 2008, a takeover that would have been far less certain without the stadium. The Games were a formative moment for Manchester and Britain, with then-IOC president Jacques Rogge viewing the games as an important litmus test as to whether Britain could host the Summer Olympics. The success of the Games quickly encouraged some speculation of a city bid for the Olympics, but London bid for the 2012 Summer Olympics and Paralympics, with London going on to win the bid on 6 July 2005 and the Games were successfully staged seven years later.

== Host city selection ==
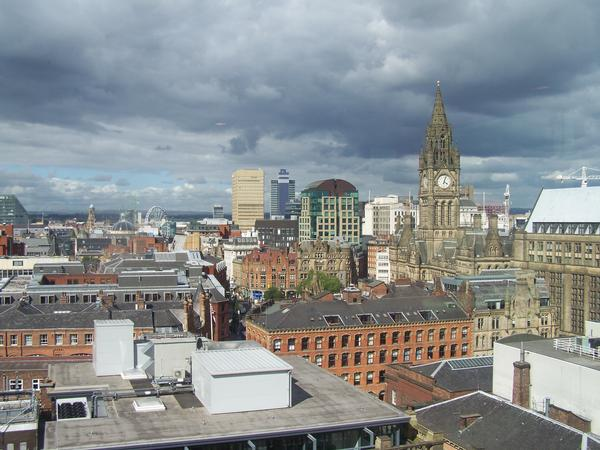
Manchester was selected by the Commonwealth Games Council of England as the official bid city from England for the 2002 Commonwealth Games.

When England decided to bid for the 2002 Commonwealth Games, three English cities – London, Manchester and Sheffield – showed interest in hosting the Games. The Commonwealth Games Council of England (CGCE) had to choose one city to put forward to the Commonwealth Games Federation (CGF). London had hosted the 1934 Commonwealth Games, as well as the 1908 and 1948 Summer Olympics, while Sheffield had hosted the 1991 Summer Universiade. Manchester had unsuccessfully bid for the 1996 and 2000 Summer Olympics, and Bob Scott, chairman of the Olympic bid committees, led the bid for another big event.

Sheffield withdrew from the bidding process when the city was unable to come to agreement over financial guarantees. This left the 24 members of the CGCE to choose between Manchester and London, with Manchester winning 17–7. Cities from no other countries submitted bids and so Manchester was announced as the host city of the 2002 Games on 6 November 1995.

2002 Commonwealth Games bidding results
City	Nation	Votes
Manchester	England	Unanimous

== Preparation and development ==
=== Venues ===
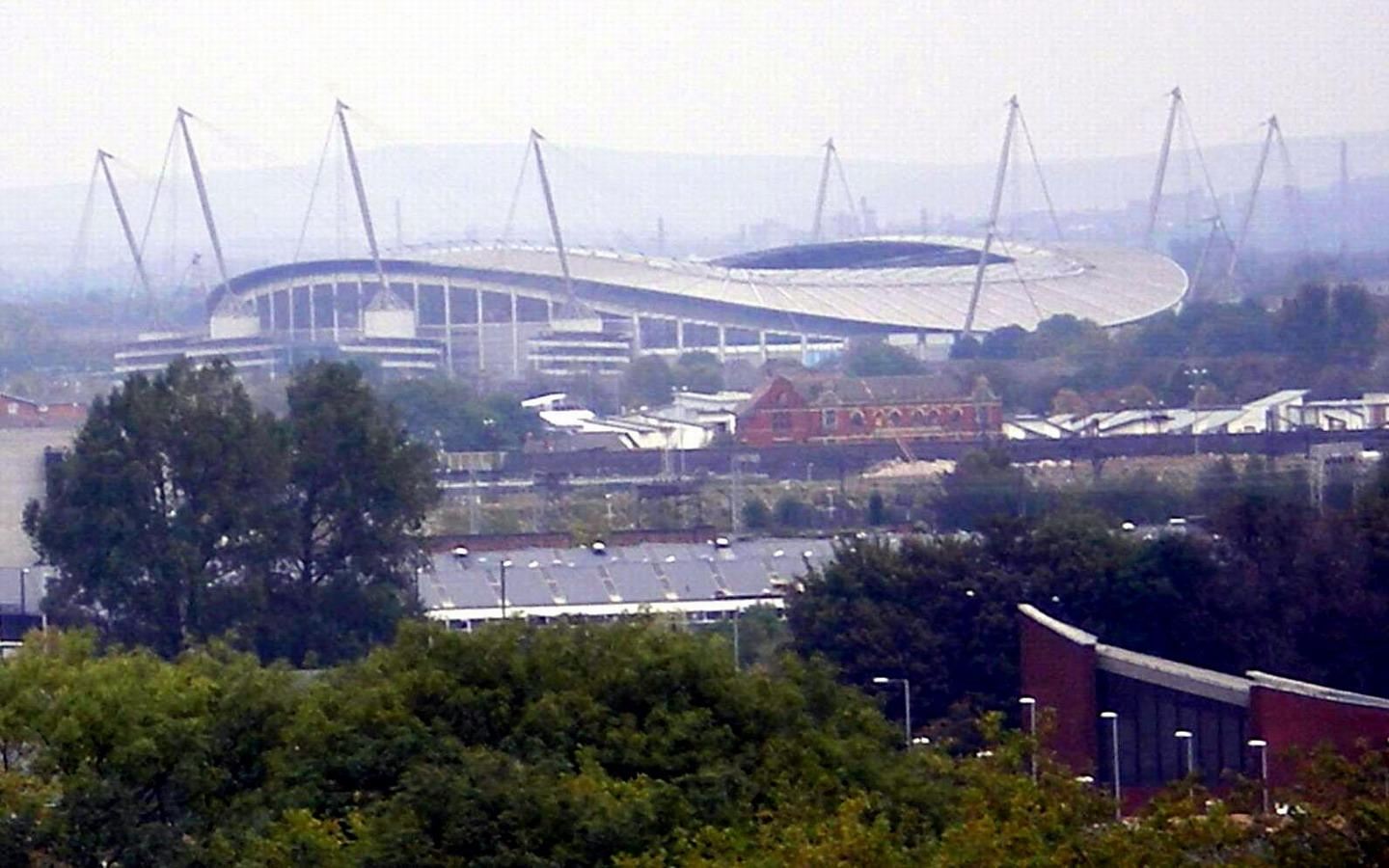
The City of Manchester Stadium hosted Athletics and Rugby Sevens events

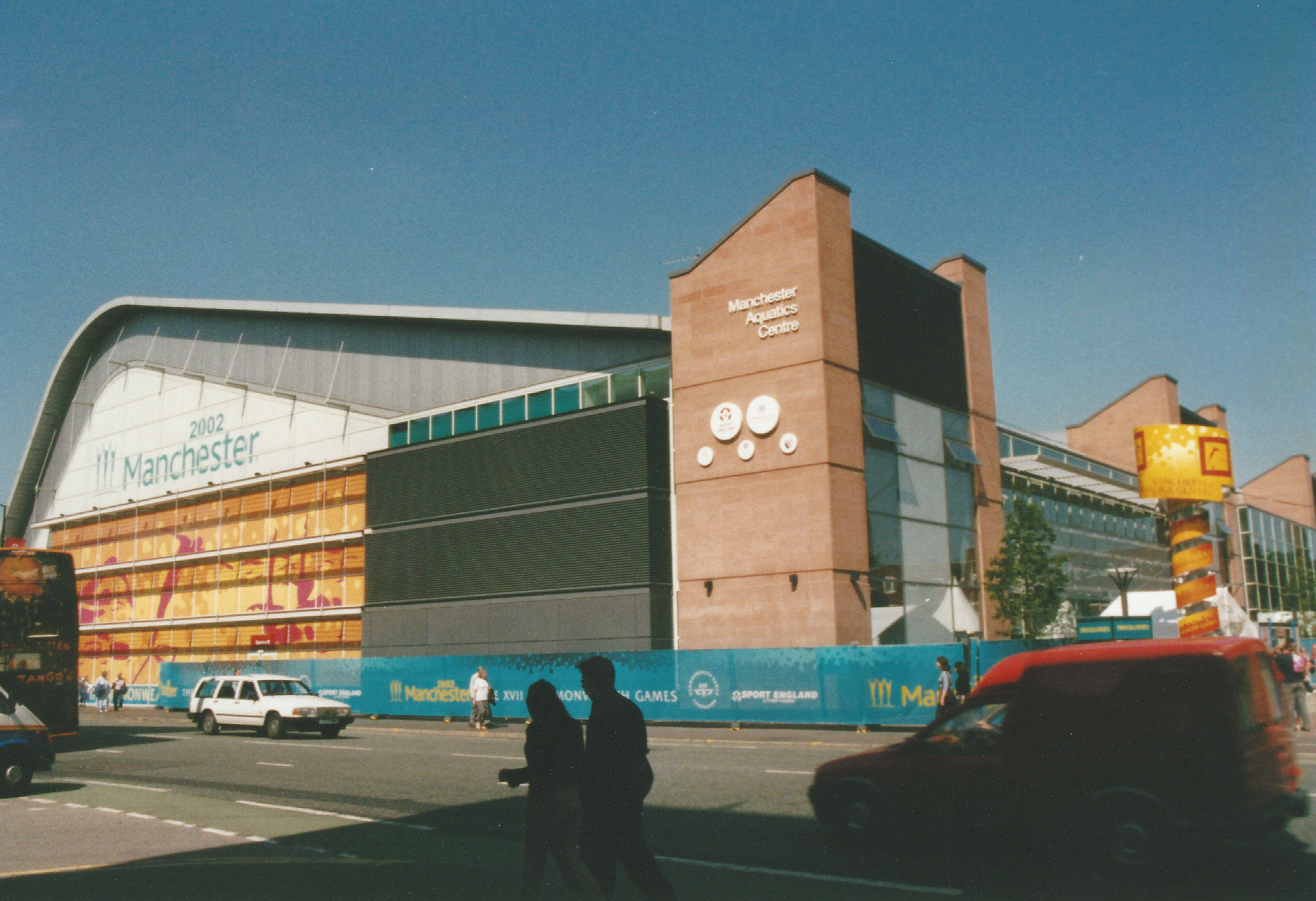
Manchester Aquatics Centre hosted Diving and Swimming events

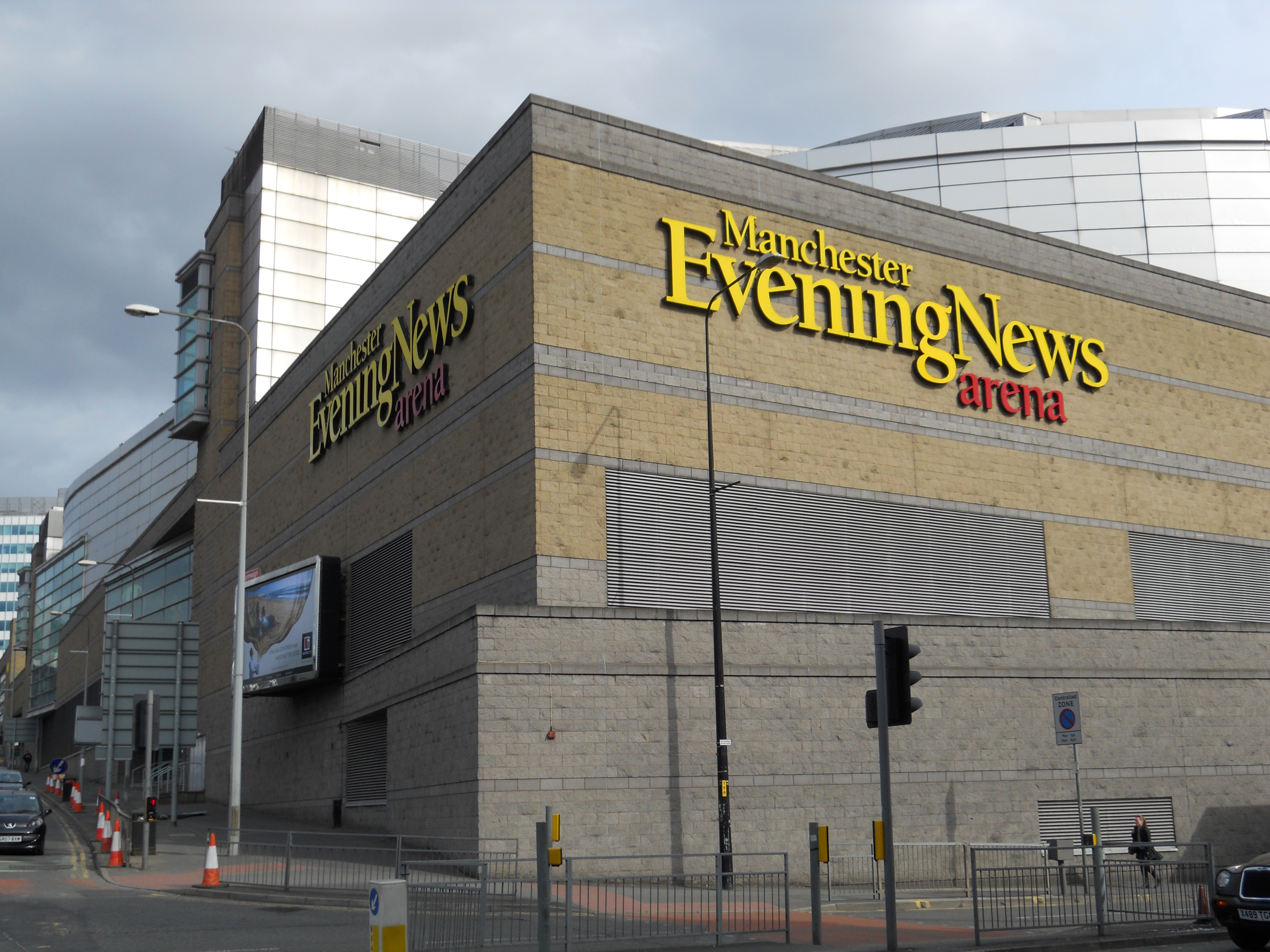
The Manchester Arena hosted the boxing and netball events

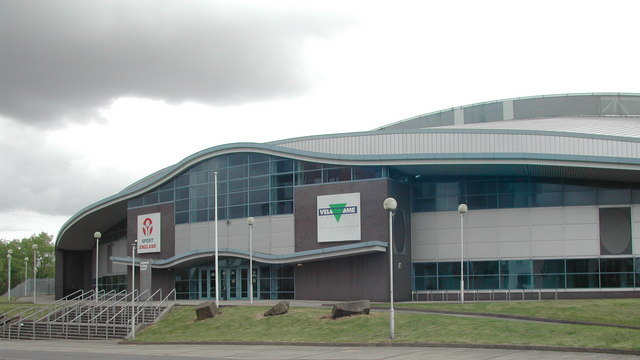
Manchester Velodrome hosted the track cycling programme

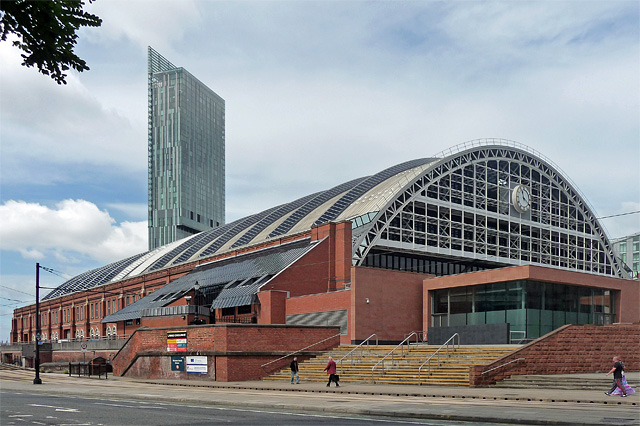
Manchester Central Convention Complex hosted gymnastics, judo, weightlifting and wrestling

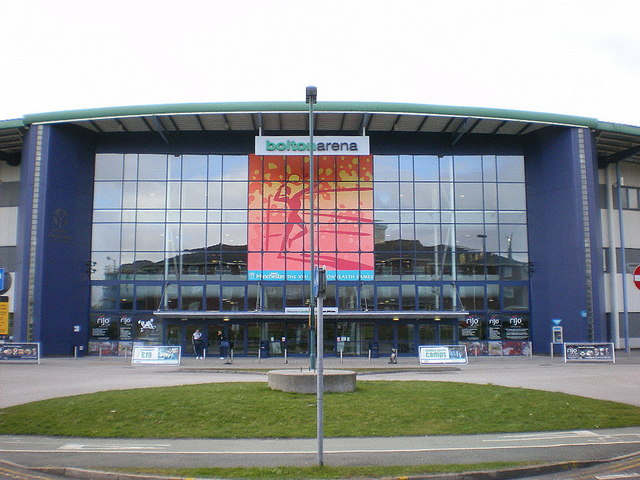
Bolton Arena hosted badminton

The Games' main venue was the City of Manchester Stadium (now Etihad Stadium), which hosted all athletics events, rugby sevens and the opening and closing ceremonies. The stadium was a smaller and downscaled version of that proposed during Manchester's bid for the 2000 Summer Olympics. Construction started in January 2000, and was completed shortly before the Games. The cost was approximately £110 million, £77 million of which was provided by Sport England, with the remainder funded by Manchester City Council. For the Commonwealth Games the stadium featured a single lower tier running around three sides of the athletics track, and second tiers to the two sides, with an open-air temporary stand at one end, giving an overall capacity of 41,000. The stadium formed the centrepiece of an area known as Sportcity. Other venues in Sportcity include the Manchester Velodrome, which hosted cycling, and the £3.5 million National Squash Centre, which was built specifically for the Games.

Swimming and diving events took place at Manchester Aquatics Centre, another purpose-built venue, and until 2012, was the only venue of its kind in the United Kingdom with two 50 metre pools.

The Manchester Arena built in 1994, at the time was the largest arena in Europe hosted netball finals and boxing preliminaries.

The shooting events were held at the National Shooting Centre (NSC), Bisley (located in Surrey). The NSC saw major redevelopment of all its ranges in order to host the fullbore rifle, smallbore rifle, pistol and clay target events.

=== Athletes' village ===
The athletes' village of the event was located in the residential area of the University of Manchester Fallowfield Campus, in an area of 30 acres, being built specifically for the event and after the event, the buildings were donated to the university and turned an expansion of the housing complex.

=== Queen's jubilee baton relay ===
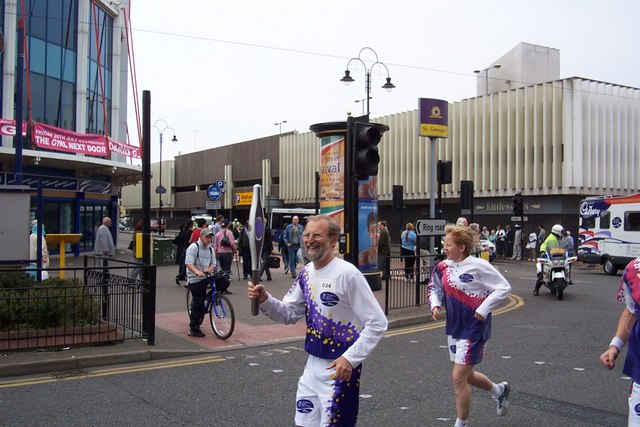
The Queen's Baton Relay passes through Wolverhampton before the 2002 Commonwealth Games in Manchester.

The 2002 Queen's Jubilee Baton Relay, the continuation of a tradition that started with the 1958 Games, consisted of the relay of an electronic baton, containing a personal message from Elizabeth II across 23 Commonwealth nations. The relay culminated in the arrival of the baton at the City of Manchester Stadium, opening the Games. The speech was then removed electronically from the baton, and read by Her Majesty to open the Games.

The 2002 Baton itself was designed by a company called IDEO, and was constructed of machined aluminium, with the handle plated for conductivity. It weighed 1.69 kg, reached over 710 mm, and was 42.5 mm to 85 mm in diameter. The Queen's message itself was held in an aluminium capsule inserted into the top of the Baton. On either side of the Baton were two sterling silver coins, designed by Mappin and Webb, which celebrated the City of Manchester as host of the XVII Commonwealth Games.

The Baton was also equipped with sensors that detected and monitored the Runner's pulse rate. This information was then conveyed to a series of light-emitting diodes (LEDs), via a light behaviour module. The lens then transformed the LEDs into a shaft of bright blue pulsating light which synchronised with each new Runner. The hearts of the Runner and the Baton then beat as one until it was passed on, symbolising the journey of humanity and the essence of life.

The Queen's Jubilee Baton Relay passed through over 500 cities, towns and villages across the UK and the Baton was carried by 5,000 individuals, with each Runner carrying the Baton up to 500 yards, however on Saturday 15 June, the baton was snatched from a runners hand in the town of Connah's Quay, Deeside in North Wales.

The UK Baton Runners were made up of people from all walks of life, including athletes, celebrities and local heroes from all over the country. Around 2,500 Jubilee Runners were nominated by the community to carry the Baton because they made a special contribution to their community or achieved a personal goal against the odds.

The judging of the Jubilee Runners was conducted by a panel of judges under the supervision of The Duke of Edinburgh's Award in January 2002. The relay was sponsored by Cadbury-Schweppes, a major UK confectionery and soft drinks manufacturer.

=== Budget ===
The cost of hosting the 2002 Commonwealth Games was estimated at £300 million. Prior to the Games, a £100 million was required to fill a financial black hole and the government agreed to provide the funding required, despite some believing that £300 million was too much.

=== Cultureshock and Festival Live ===
Cultureshock was the Commonwealth Games Cultural Programme which ran alongside the Games themselves. The events ranged from images of the athlete as hero in sculpture and photography (Go! Freeze, which ran at Turton Tower in Bolton) to a Zulu performance at The Lowry. There was an exhibition at the Whitworth Art Gallery called Tales of Power: West African Textiles, and a performance of the film Monsoon Wedding at Clwyd Theatr Cymru. The geographical range was from Cheshire in the south to Blackburn and Cumbria in the north, and included that year the various Melas that take place around the region.

Cultureshock also ensured that a wide range of cultural events and acts reached the "man on the street", with the city centre of Manchester filled with bands, performers, and artists of various forms entertaining the thousands of visitors to the Games. It also coincided with the BBC's 2002 Festival Live series of open-air concerts and celebrations around the country, held to celebrate the Queen's Golden Jubilee. Many of the cultural events were covered by the BBC 2002 radio station covering the games.

=== Opening ceremony ===
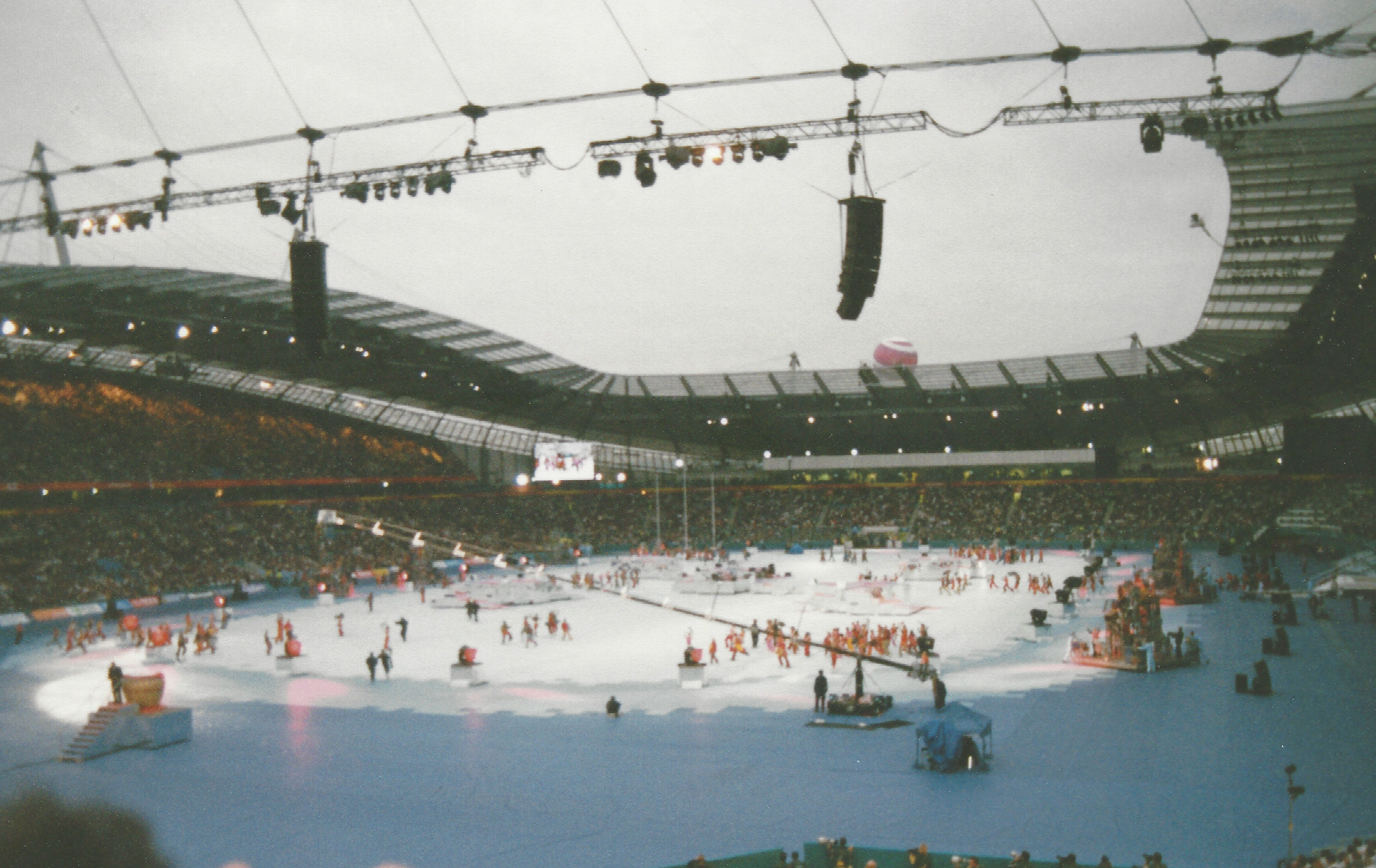
Opening Ceremony

The project & artistic director for the opening ceremony was David Zolkwer. Five-time Olympic champion Sir Steve Redgrave opened the two-and-a-quarter-hour opening ceremony by banging a large drum, which initiated a co-ordinated dance and fireworks act. The champion rower was joined on the stage by sporting stars including yachtswoman Ellen MacArthur, heptathlete Denise Lewis, long-distance runner Moses Kiptanui, swimmer Susie O'Neill and sprinter Donovan Bailey. The Grenadier Guards shared the arena with pop band S Club and Salford-born opera singer Russell Watson sang the Games' theme, "Faith of the Heart", while the arrival of HM The Queen was greeted with a flypast by the Red Arrows. England football captain David Beckham helped chaperone Queen's Baton final runner Kirsty Howard, assisting the terminally ill six-year-old to hand the baton to The Queen. A 4,000-strong cast took part in the £12 million spectacular, which in theme and tone consisted of a mix of "pomp and pop", combining the ceremonial aspects of the Games with a party-style atmosphere, based on Manchester's reputation as the party city of "Madchester". The ceremony was voiced by broadcaster Anthony Davis.

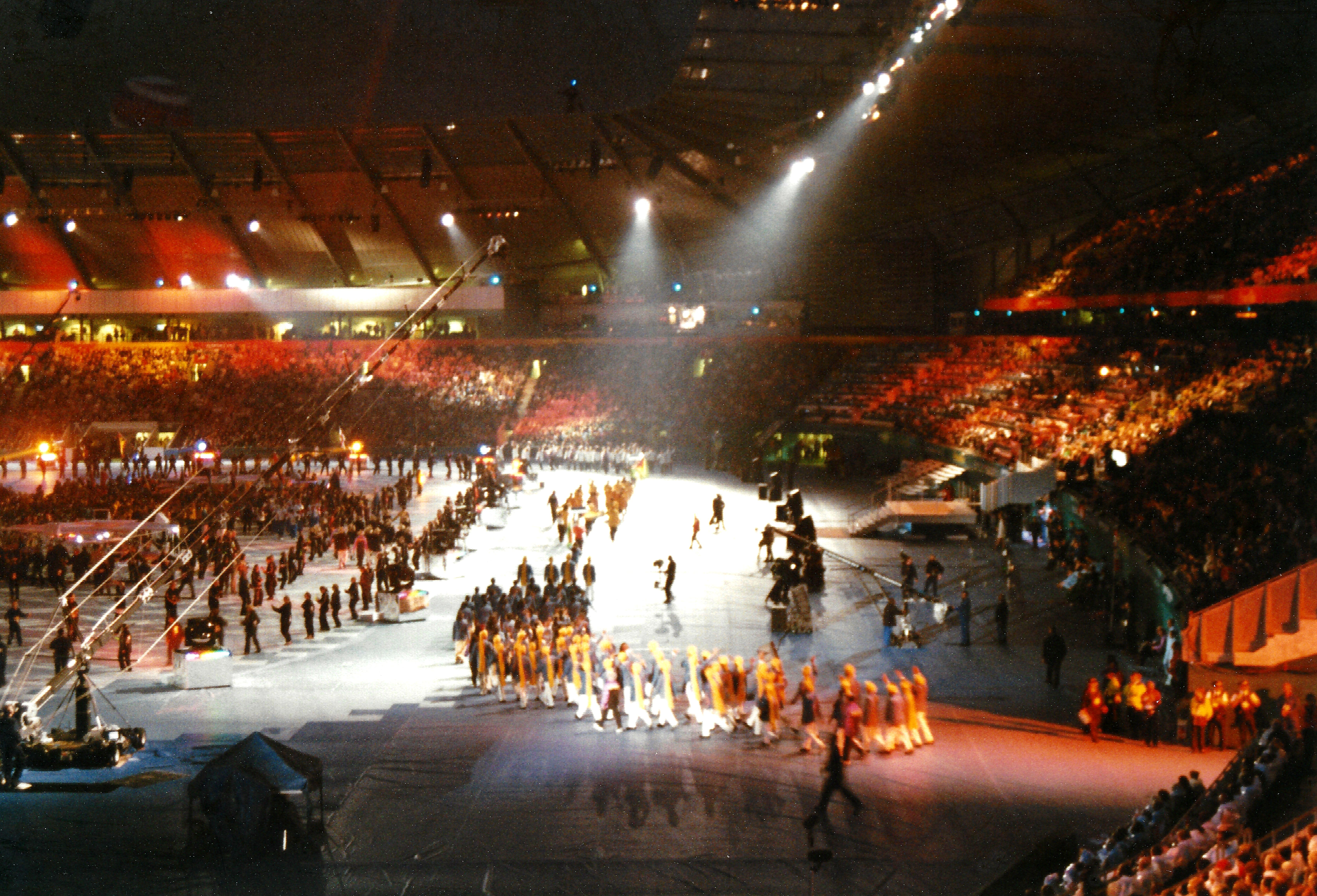
Athletes Parade at the Opening Ceremony

The traditional athletes' parade was led by previous hosts Malaysia, and England brought up the rear before The Queen, as the Head of the Commonwealth, declared the Games open:

"All of us participating in this ceremony tonight, whether athletes or spectators, or those watching on television around the world, can share in the ideals of this unique association of nations,"

"We can all draw inspiration from what the Commonwealth stands for, our diversity as a source of strength, our tradition of tolerance ... our focus on young people, for they are our future."

"It is my pleasure in this my Golden Jubilee Year to declare the 17th Commonwealth Games open."

=== Closing ceremony ===
The project & artistic director for the closing ceremony was also a project from David Zolkwer. The Queen ended 11 days of competition at a rain-drenched closing ceremony in the City of Manchester Stadium. She declared the games closed in front of a 38,000 sell-out crowd gathered in the stadium. She also called on the athletes to assemble again in four years in Melbourne and to continue displaying the "friendship" they had shown in Manchester. The ceremony, attended by Prime Minister Tony Blair and several other dignitaries, took place in pouring rain and, like the opening ceremony, mixed "pomp with pop". Australian Ian Thorpe, the star of the Games with his six swimming golds, carried his national flag into the arena, along with athletes from each of the other competing countries. Around 40,000 balloons were released into the rainy Manchester sky as the ceremony concluded with a spectacular fireworks display.

Closing ceremony highlights included:

- Children covering themselves with red, blue and white paint to portray a giant British flag before unveiling a giant portrait of The Queen as a Golden Jubilee gift.
- The athletes bringing their national flags into the stadium.
- South African swimmer Natalie du Toit being honoured as the outstanding athlete of the Games.
- The symbolic handover of the Commonwealth Games Ceremonial Flag to Melbourne, host city for the 2006 Games.
- A spectacular presentation with over 1,700 lanterns, which ended with the message 'Seek Peace' lit up in vast letters on the floor of the arena.
- Coronation Street stars Steve Arnold and Tracy Shaw (who played characters Ashley and Maxine Peacock) arriving in one of 40 Morris Minors, which became the centre of a song-and-dance showpiece.
- Hip-hop DJ Grandmaster Flash encouraging the massed ranks to "make some noise" as athletes and volunteers poured into the arena to music from the likes of Will Young, Dave Stewart, Heather Small, Jimmy Cliff, Beverley Knight and Toploader.
- During the handover to Melbourne, Vanessa Amorosi sang her signature tune, Shine and a new song called "I'll always be a Melbourne girl". However, during this segment the rain began to intensify and thicken.

== Participating teams ==
There were 73 participating countries, territories and Commonwealth regions at the 2002 Commonwealth Games. The 2002 Games marked the last time Zimbabwe has participated to date, as the country formally withdrew from the Commonwealth of Nations the following year.

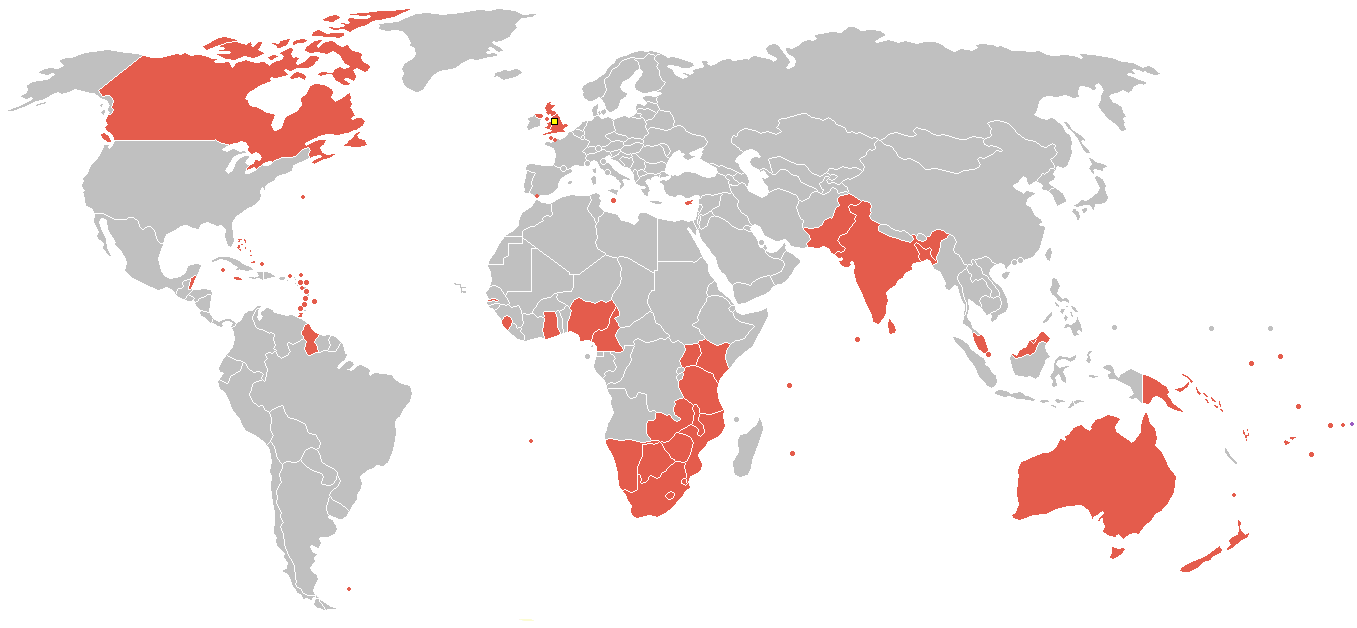
Nations competed at the 2002 Commonwealth Games in Manchester

Participating Commonwealth Countries & Territories
- Anguilla
- Antigua and Barbuda
- Australia
- Bahamas
- Bangladesh
- Barbados
- Belize
- Bermuda
- Botswana
- British Virgin Islands
- Brunei
- Cameroon
- Canada
- Cayman Islands
- Cook Islands
- Cyprus
- Dominica
- England (host)
- Falkland Islands
- Fiji
- Gambia
- Ghana
- Gibraltar
- Grenada
- Guernsey
- Guyana
- Hong Kong
- India
- Isle of Man
- Jamaica
- Jersey
- Kenya
- Kiribati
- Lesotho
- Malawi
- Malaysia
- Maldives
- Malta
- Mauritius
- Montserrat
- Mozambique
- Namibia
- Nauru
- New Zealand
- Nigeria
- Niue
- Norfolk Island
- Northern Ireland
- Pakistan
- Papua New Guinea
- Saint Helena
- Saint Kitts and Nevis
- Saint Lucia
- Saint Vincent and the Grenadines
- Samoa
- Scotland
- Seychelles
- Sierra Leone
- Singapore
- Solomon Islands
- South Africa
- Sri Lanka
- Swaziland
- Tanzania
- Tonga
- Trinidad and Tobago
- Turks and Caicos Islands
- Tuvalu
- Uganda
- Vanuatu
- Wales
- Zambia
- Zimbabwe

== Calendar ==
OC	Opening ceremony	●	Event competitions	1	Gold medal events	CC	Closing ceremony

July/August 2002	July							August				Events
July/August 2002	25th Thu	26th Fri	27th Sat	28th Sun	29th Mon	30th Tue	31st Wed	1st Thu	2nd Fri	3rd Sat	4th Sun	Events
Ceremonies	OC										CC	—N/a
Athletics		2	5	12	9	7	13					48
Badminton		●	●	●	●	1	●	●	●	●	5	6
Boxing		●	●	●	●	●	●	●		12		12
Cycling			2	2	2	1	2	3	3	2		17
Diving	2	2	2									6
Gymnastics		1	1	2	10							14
Hockey		●	●	●	●	●	●	●	●	1	1	2
Judo						4	5	5				14
Lawn bowls						1	1	1		1	4	8
Netball		●	●	●	●	●	●		●		1	1
Rugby sevens									●	●	1	1
Shooting			5	6	5	6	3	6	4	5		40
Squash		●	●	●	●	●	2	●	●	●	3	5
Swimming						5	5	9	5	11	7	42
Synchronised swimming		1	1									2
Triathlon											2	2
Table tennis		●	●	●	●	2	●	●	●	2	4	8
Weightlifting						9	9	9	9	10		46
Wrestling									●	4	3	7
Daily medal events	2	6	16	22	26	36	40	33	21	48	31	281
Cumulative total	2	8	24	46	72	108	148	181	202	250	281	281
July/August 2002	25th Thu	26th Fri	27th Sat	28th Sun	29th Mon	30th Tue	31st Wed	1st Thu	2nd Fri	3rd Sat	4th Sun	Total events
July/August 2002	July							August				Total events

== Sports ==
There were the maximum of 17 sports included in the schedule for the 2002 Commonwealth Games.

Sport	Venue	Number of medal events
Aquatics	Manchester Aquatics Centre	50
Athletics	City of Manchester Stadium (Track and field, Marathon), Salford Quays (race walking)	48
Badminton	Bolton Arena	6
Boxing	Wythenshawe Forum, Manchester Arena	12
Cycling	Manchester Velodrome (track events), Rivington (road races)	17
Gymnastics	Manchester Central Convention Complex	15
Hockey	Belle Vue Complex	2
Judo	Manchester Central Convention Complex	14
Lawn bowls	Heaton Park	6
Netball	Manchester Arena	1
Rugby Sevens	City of Manchester Stadium	1
Shooting	Bisley Shooting Centre	40
Squash	National Squash Centre	5
Table tennis	Table Tennis Centre, Sportcity	8
Triathlon	Salford Quays	2
Weightlifting	Manchester Central Convention Complex	46
Wrestling	Manchester Central Convention Complex	7

After experimenting with it on a smaller scale at the 1994 Commonwealth Games and dropping it at the 1998 Games, disabled competitions were held in swimming, athletics, bowls, table tennis and weightlifting (powerlifting). The medals were added to the final tally for each nation.

== Highlights ==
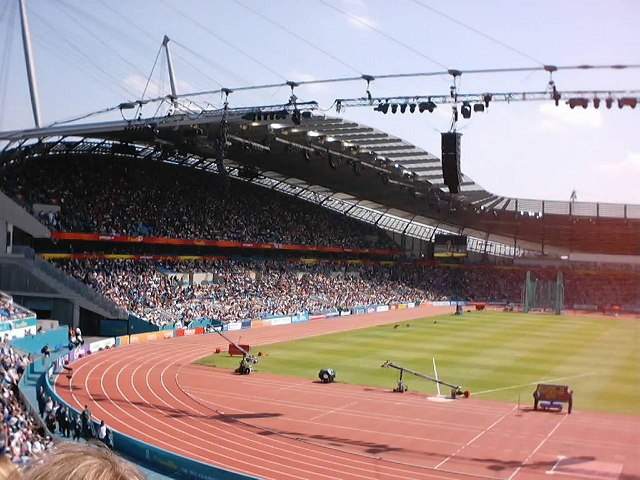
The City of Manchester Stadium during the Games

- Australian Ian Thorpe set a world record in the 400-metre freestyle swimming.
- English swimmer Zoë Baker set a world record in the 50-metre breaststroke.
- English track athlete Paula Radcliffe won her first major gold medal in the 5,000 metres, to record a time of 14:31.42, over 20 seconds ahead of silver medallist Edith Masai of Kenya and 1 minute 21 seconds faster than the inaugural running of the event four years earlier.
- In the final of the 100 m for men (athletics), the two English favourites (Dwain Chambers & Mark Lewis-Francis) both pulled up with injuries. The race was won by Kim Collins of Saint Kitts and Nevis, winning the country's first Commonwealth title.
- Simon Whitfield of Canada, the 2000 Olympic champion and the 2008 Olympic silver medallist, won gold in the triathlon.
- On the last day of track competition, England won gold in both the men's 4×100 and 4×400 relays by tiny margins, recording the same time (38.62) as the Jamaican quartet in sprint relay and holding off a fast finishing Welsh team by 1/100 of a second in the longer race, with a winning time of 3:00.40.
- The women's 4×400 relay was won by Australia after the favoured Jamaican team dropped the baton.
- In winning the triple jump, England's Jonathan Edwards simultaneously held the World, Olympic, European and Commonwealth championships and the World record. He would lose the European title a week later in Munich.
- Another world record was set in the 4000-metre team pursuit at the track cycling by the Australian team. Scot Chris Hoy took the individual time trial and 19-year-old Nicole Cooke of Wales won the women's cycling road race.
- South African swimmer Natalie du Toit created history. As well as winning her events in the newly included disabled swimming event, the 18-year-old, missing the lower section of her left leg, made the final of the 800-metre able-bodied freestyle event in one of a small number of disabled sporting events integrated into the games.
- In gymnastics, England's Beth Tweddle and Kanukai Jackson took gold in the asymmetric bars and all around events respectively. Herodotos Giorgallas also won the first gymnastics gold ever for Cyprus when tying with Scotland's Steve Frew.
- The host broadcaster of the games was the BBC, and the International Broadcast Centre was located at the Manchester College of Arts and Technology.

== Medal table ==
* Host nation (England)

Rank	CGA	Gold	Silver	Bronze	Total
1	Australia	82	62	63	207
2	England*	54	51	60	165
3	Canada	31	41	44	116
4	India	30	22	17	69
5	New Zealand	11	13	21	45
6	South Africa	9	20	17	46
7	Cameroon	9	1	2	12
8	Malaysia	7	9	18	34
9	Wales	6	13	12	31
10	Scotland	6	8	16	30
11	Nigeria	5	3	11	19
12	Kenya	4	8	4	16
13	Jamaica	4	6	7	17
14	Singapore	4	2	7	13
15	Bahamas	4	0	4	8
16	Nauru	2	5	8	15
17	Northern Ireland	2	2	1	5
18	Cyprus	2	1	1	4
19	Pakistan	1	3	4	8
20	Fiji	1	1	1	3
20	Zambia	1	1	1	3
22	Zimbabwe	1	1	0	2
23	Namibia	1	0	4	5
24	Tanzania	1	0	1	2
25	Bangladesh	1	0	0	1
25	Guyana	1	0	0	1
25	Mozambique	1	0	0	1
25	Saint Kitts and Nevis	1	0	0	1
29	Botswana	0	2	1	3
30	Uganda	0	2	0	2
31	Samoa	0	1	2	3
32	Trinidad and Tobago	0	1	0	1
33	Barbados	0	0	1	1
33	Cayman Islands	0	0	1	1
33	Ghana	0	0	1	1
33	Lesotho	0	0	1	1
33	Malta	0	0	1	1
33	Mauritius	0	0	1	1
33	Saint Lucia	0	0	1	1
Totals (39 entries)		282	279	334	895

== Legacy host city and nation ==
In terms of infrastructure, the Games were the catalyst for the widespread redevelopment of the east of the city, an area which had remained derelict since the departure of heavy industry some decades before. The 2002 Commonwealth Games set a new benchmark for hosting the Commonwealth Games and for cities wishing to bid for them with a heavy emphasis on legacy.

The venue and financial policy of the 2002 Commonwealth Games has influenced future sporting events, including the 2006 Commonwealth Games in Melbourne, the 2012 Summer Olympics in London and 2014 Commonwealth Games in Glasgow.

In comparison to other sporting events, the 2002 games were marked by financial discipline. The cost of the 2010 Commonwealth Games were estimated at $4.1 billion, the London 2012 Summer Olympics are estimated to cost £9 billion, while the 2014 Commonwealth Games could cost as much as £500 million.

Sporting legacy included the City of Manchester Stadium, which was turned over to Manchester City Football Club, to replace the ageing Maine Road. It is possible that this provided an incentive which led to the eventual 2008 take over by the Abu Dhabi United group led by Sheikh Mansour. Consequently, they have seen a considerable upturn in their success, with a series of transfers which has increased the profile of Manchester further, as Manchester City have become title challengers. Indeed, journalists have stated Mansour would not have bought the city had the club not had the 50,000 stadium. The Manchester Velodrome was built in 1994 in preparation for an Olympic bid, but subsequently hosted the 2002 Commonwealth Games. Since opening in 1994, it has been cited as a catalyst for Britain's successes in track cycling since 2002. At the 2008 Olympics in Beijing, the Great British cycling claimed 8 of the 18 gold medals on offer, including 14 of the 54 medals available altogether. This unprecedented achievement was partly attributed to the availability of a velodrome.

Local communities benefited from facilities built for the game such as the Manchester Aquatics Centre, the Northern Regional Tennis Centre and the National Squash Centre. There were comprehensive upgrades of Belle Vue and Moss Side leisure centres to serve their local communities.

Olympic president Jacques Rogge said the Games had gone a long way to restoring Britain's credibility in terms of hosting big sporting events. It has since been said that the success of the games was a major factor in reassuring the UK's sporting authorities and the government that the country could successfully stage major successful international sporting events and that, without them, London's successful bid for the 2012 Summer Olympics would not have come about. Public houses and restaurants in Manchester reported a threefold increase in takings during the Games, and local tourism board Marketing Manchester estimate some 300,000 more visitors will come to the city each year as a result of its increased profile. It is estimated that by 2008 £600m has been invested in the region as a result of the Games and that about 20,000 jobs had been created.

== Marketing ==
=== Logo ===
Manchester 2002 bid logo

The 2002 Commonwealth Games' logo is an image of three figures standing on a podium with their arms uplifted in the jubilation of winning or in celebration, which represents the three core themes of the Games: sport, culture and friendship and the types of medalist in the games: gold, silver and bronze. The figures are captured in three colours which are red, blue and green. The red represents performance, passion and success; the blue symbolises intelligence, confidence and reliability, while the green represents loyalty, balance and generosity. The yellow background behind the figures represents the competitive, powerful and cheerful elements of the Games, while the black games' name letters representing solidarity and strength. The figures in the logo joining hands to resemble the letter 'M', which is the initial for the host city, Manchester and also a crown of the queen to represent the Golden Jubilee of Elizabeth II's reign as the monarch of The United Kingdom. The logo overall represents a celebration of sharing and friendship and the pride of participating in the Games, cheerful atmosphere, sportsmanship and confidence of Manchester as the games host city. The bid logo consisted of the number "22" and the letter "M" making up a smiley face.

=== Mascot ===
The official mascot of the 2002 Commonwealth Games was a cat named Kit. The purpose of adopting the cat as the games' mascot was to represent the young, vibrant, friendly, dynamic personality of Manchester as the games' host city.

=== Sponsors ===
Sponsors of the 2002 Commonwealth Games
Sponsors
- Adecco
- Asda
- Bupa
- Cadbury
- Guardian Media Group
- Manchester Airport
- Microsoft
- PZ Cussons (Imperial Leather)
- Rover
Partners
- Addleshaw Booth & Co
- Boddingtons Brewery
- Bruntwood
- Claremont
- FirstGroup
- Guilbert
- Trafford Centre
- United Utilities
- Virgin Rail Group
- Xerox
Governmental and Media
- BBC Manchester
- Manchester City Council
- Manchester Evening News

== See also ==
- Commonwealth Games celebrated in England
  - 1934 Commonwealth Games – London
  - 2022 Commonwealth Games – Birmingham

Preceded by Kuala Lumpur	Commonwealth Games; Manchester; XVII Commonwealth Games	Succeeded by Melbourne
