= Cycling at the 2002 Commonwealth Games =

Cycling
- Venue: Track: Manchester Velodrome; Road, mountain biking: Rivington
- Location: Manchester, England
- Dates: 25 July to 4 August 2002

Cycling at the 2002 Commonwealth Games was the 16th appearance of Cycling at the Commonwealth Games. The events were held in Manchester, England, from 25 July to 4 August 2002.

Competition saw an increase of four events on 1998, which included the debut of a mountain biking. The road events were held in Rivington and the track events took place at the Manchester Velodrome. The road race was a 130 miles course consisting of 18 laps starting at Rivington and ending at Blackrod High School.

Australia topped the cycling medal table, by virtue of winning ten gold medals.

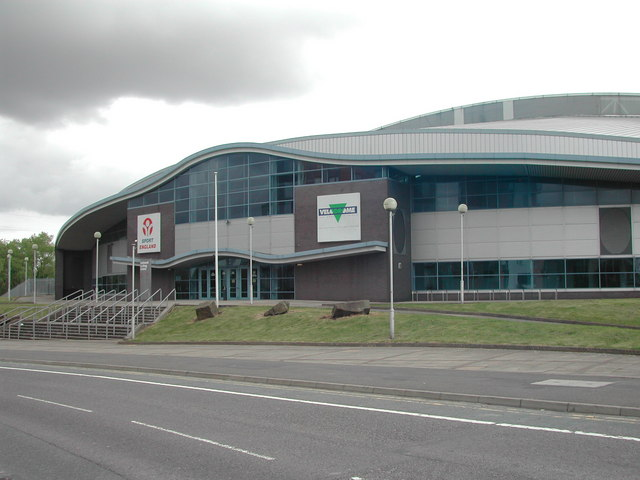
The Manchester Velodrome

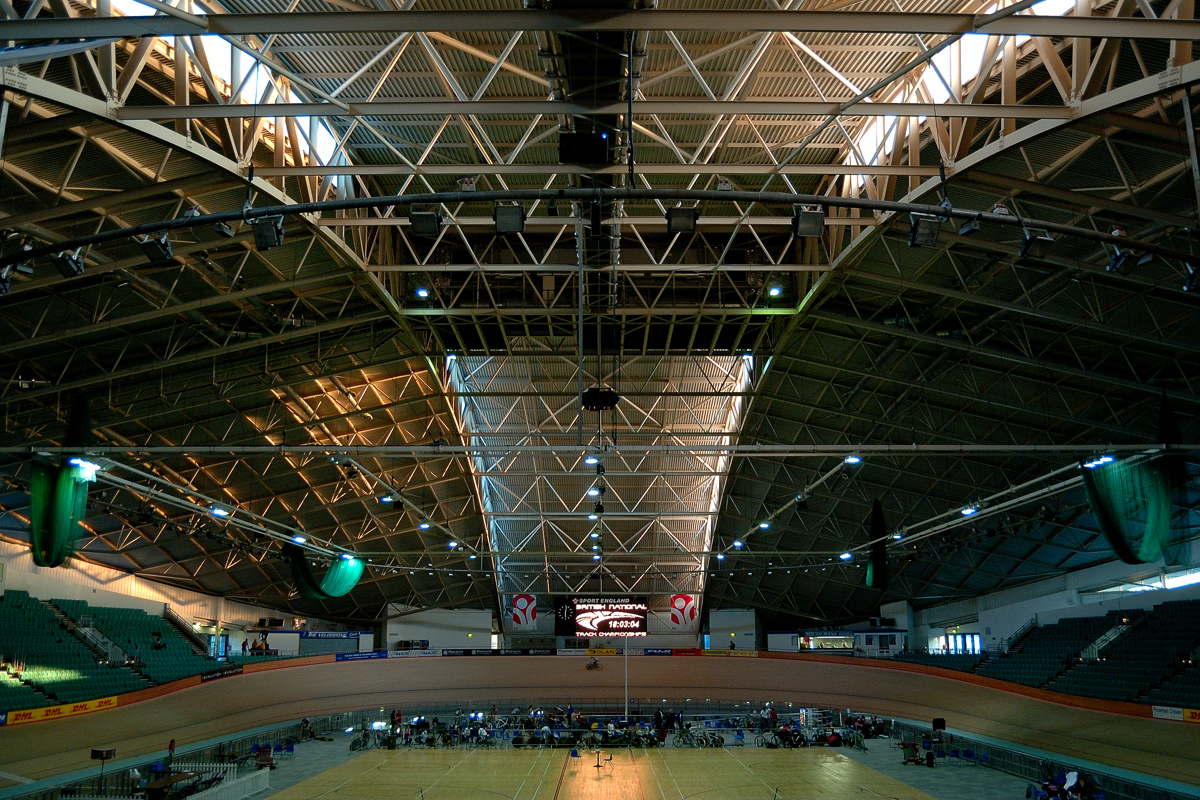
Interior of the velodrome

== Medal table ==
| Rank | Nation | Gold | Silver | Bronze | Total |
|---|---|---|---|---|---|
| 1 | Australia | 10 | 7 | 6 | 23 |
| 2 | Canada | 3 | 3 | 3 | 9 |
| 3 | New Zealand | 2 | 1 | 1 | 4 |
| 4 | Wales | 1 | 1 | 0 | 2 |
| 5 | Scotland | 1 | 0 | 1 | 2 |
| 6 | England | 0 | 5 | 6 | 11 |
| Totals (6 entries) | | 17 | 17 | 17 | 51 |

== Medallists ==
=== Road ===
| Event | Gold | Silver | Bronze |
|---|---|---|---|
Men
| Road race | Stuart O'Grady; Australia | Cadel Evans; Australia | Baden Cooke; Australia |
| Road time trial | Cadel Evans; Australia | Michael Rogers; Australia | Nathan O'Neill; Australia |
Women
| Road race | Nicole Cooke; Wales | Sue Palmer-Komar; Canada | Rachel Heal; England |
| Road time trial | Clara Hughes; Canada | Anna Millward; Australia | Lyne Bessette; Canada |

=== Track ===
| Event | Gold | Silver | Bronze |
|---|---|---|---|
Men
| Sprint | Ryan Bayley; Australia | Sean Eadie; Australia | Jobie Dajka; Australia |
| Team sprint | Australia; Jobie Dajka; Sean Eadie; Ryan Bayley | England; Jamie Staff; Jason Queally; Andy Slater | Scotland; Chris Hoy; Craig MacLean; Ross Edgar |
| Time trial | Chris Hoy; Scotland | Jason Queally; England | Jamie Staff; England |
| Individual pursuit | Bradley McGee; Australia | Bradley Wiggins; England | Paul Manning; England |
| Team pursuit | Australia; Graeme Brown; Luke Roberts; Mark Renshaw; Peter Dawson; Stephen Wooldridge | England; Bradley Wiggins; Bryan Steel; Chris Newton; Paul Manning; Stephen Cummings | New Zealand; Greg Henderson; Hayden Roulston; Lee Vertongen; Matthew Randall |
| Scratch race | Graeme Brown; Australia | Huw Pritchard; Wales | Tony Gibb; England |
| Points race | Greg Henderson; New Zealand | Mark Renshaw; Australia | Chris Newton; England |
Women
| Sprint | Kerrie Meares; Australia | Lori-Ann Muenzer; Canada | Anna Meares; Australia |
| Time trial | Kerrie Meares; Australia | Julie Paulding; England | Lori-Ann Muenzer; Canada |
| Individual pursuit | Sarah Ulmer; New Zealand | Katherine Bates; Australia | Alison Wright; Australia |
| Points race | Katherine Bates; Australia | Rochelle Gilmore; Australia | Clara Hughes; Canada |

=== Mountain biking ===
| Event | Gold | Silver | Bronze |
|---|---|---|---|
Men
| Cross country | Roland Green; Canada | Seamus McGrath; Canada | Liam Killeen; England |
Women
| Cross country | Chrissy Redden; Canada | Susy Pryde; New Zealand | Mary Grigson; Australia |

== Results ==
=== Road ===
Men's road race

| Pos | Athlete | Time |
|---|---|---|
| 1 | (Australia) Stuart O'Grady | 4:43:17 |
| 2 | (Australia) Cadel Evans | 4:45:25 |
| 3 | (Australia) Baden Cooke | 4:45:45 |
| 4 | (New Zealand) Glen Mitchell | 4:45:45 |
| 5 | (Canada) Eric Wohlberg | 4:46:04 |
| 6 | (New Zealand) Hayden Roulston | 4:46:09 |
| 7 | (South Africa) Robbie Hunter | 4:46:18 |
| 8 | (England) Roger Hammond | 4:46:19 |
| 9 | (Canada) Mike Barry | 4:46:19 |
| 10 | (South Africa) David George | 4:46:31 |
| 11 | (Canada) Mark Walters | 4:49:16 |
| 12 | (Northern Ireland) Tommy Evans | 4:52:52 |
| 13 | (Wales) Yanto Barker | 4:52:53 |
| 14 | (New Zealand) Ryan Russell | 4:53:34 |
| 15 | (Wales) Anthony Malarczyk | 4:53:34 |
| 16 | (Scotland) Duncan Urquhart | 4:54:13 |
| 17 | (New Zealand) Karl Moore | 4:54:44 |
| 18 | (England) John Tanner | 4:54:44 |
| 19 | (Northern Ireland) Denis Easton | 4:55:10 |
| 20 | (Trinidad and Tobago) Emile Abraham | 4:55:12 |
| 21 | (England) Mark Lovatt | 4:55:13 |
| 22 | (Wales) Julian Winn | 4:55:13 |
| 23 | (Northern Ireland) Stephen Gallagher | 4:55:13 |
| 24 | (South Africa) Malcolm Lange | 4:55:14 |
| 25 | (New Zealand) Kachi Leuchs | 4:55:15 |
| 26 | (South Africa) Daniel Spence | 4:55:20 |
| 27 | (South Africa) Nic White | 4:55:20 |
| 28 | (England) Charly Wegelius | 4:55:46 |
| 29 | (Namibia) Johannes Heymans | 4:57:20 |
| 30 | (Northern Ireland) David Gardiner | 4:58:04 |
| 31 | (Wales) James Griffiths | 4:58:04 |
| 32 | (Isle of Man) Andrew Roche | 4:58:04 |
| 33 | (New Zealand) Gordon McCauley | 4:58:04 |

Men's road time trial

| Pos | Athlete | Time |
|---|---|---|
| 1 | (Australia) Cadel Evans | 1:00:53.50 |
| 2 | (Australia) Michael Rogers | 1:02:50.36 |
| 3 | (Australia) Nathan O'Neill | 1:03:20.69 |
| 4 | (Canada) Eric Wohlberg | 1:04:29.76 |
| 5 | (England) Charly Wegelius | 1:04:44.43 |
| 6 | (New Zealand) David George | 1:04:53.50 |
| 7 | (South Africa) James Piri | 1:04:57.28 |
| 8 | (Northern Ireland) David McCann | 1:05:24.64 |
| 9 | (New Zealand) Gordon McCauley | 1:05:44.38 |
| 10 | (New Zealand) Heath Blackgrove | 1:05:49.78 |
| 11 | (New Zealand) Glen Mitchell | 1:05:58.06 |
| 12 | (Wales) Julian Winn | 1:06:26.20 |
| 13 | (South Africa) Nic White | 1:06:32.48 |
| 14 | (Isle of Man) Andrew Roche | 1:06:52.34 |
| 15 | (Northern Ireland) Michael Hutchinson | 1:07:16.96 |
| 16 | (Scotland) Jason MacIntyre | 1:07:32.61 |
| 17 | (Canada) Mark Walters | 1:07:49.14 |
| 18 | (Bermuda) Chris Hedges | 1:08:11.10 |
| 19 | (Scotland) Duncan Urquhart | 1:08:26.71 |
| 20 | (Wales) Anthony Malarczyk | 1:09:12.60 |
| 21 | (Wales) Paul Sheppard | 1:09:26.55 |
| 22 | (Seychelles) Hudson Mathieu | 1:10:51.59 |
| 23 | (Kenya) David Kinja Njau | 1:11:41.42 |
| 24 | (Jersey) Chris Spence | 1:12:38.19 |
| 25 | (Northern Ireland) Brendan Doherty | 1:13:03.80 |
| 26 | (Namibia) Erik Hoffman | 1:13:32.89 |
| 27 | (Guernsey) Paul Brehaut | 1:14:14.54 |
| 28 | (The Bahamas) Jonathan David Massie | 1:16:18.85 |
| 29 | (Angola) Charles Bryan | 1:16:38.17 |
| 30 | (Cameroon) Martinien Tega | 1:17:05.79 |

Women's road race

| Pos | Athlete | Time |
|---|---|---|
| 1 | (Wales) Nicole Cooke | 2:35:17 |
| 2 | (Canada) Sue Palmer-Komar | 2:35:18 |
| 3 | (England) Rachel Heal | 2:35:18 |
| 4 | (Australia) Hayley Rutherford | 2:35:18 |
| 5 | (New Zealand) Roz Reekie-May | 2:35:18 |
| 6 | (Scotland) Caroline Alexander | 2:35:18 |
| 7 | (Canada) Lyne Bessette | 2:35:19 |
| 8 | (England) Frances Newstead | 2:35:43 |
| 9 | (Australia) Anna Millward | 2:36:57 |
| 10 | (Australia) Elizabeth Tadich | 2:39:05 |
| 11 | (New Zealand) Melissa Holt | 2:39:05 |
| 12 | (Australia) Margaret Hemsley | 2:39:08 |
| 13 | (Australia) Rochelle Gilmore | 2:42:46 |
| 14 | (England) Emma Davies | 2:42:46 |
| 15 | (Canada) Erin Carter | 2:42:46 |
| 16 | (Guernsey) Ann Bowditch | 2:42:47 |
| 17 | (England) Mel Sears | 2:42:47 |
| 18 | (New Zealand) Vanessa Guyton | 2:42:47 |
| 19 | (Scotland) Sally Ashbridge | 2:42:47 |
| 20 | (Canada) Clara Hughes | 2:42:47 |
| 21 | (Australia) Sara Carrigan | 2:42:47 |
| 22 | (Wales) Nina Davies | 2:42:47 |
| 23 | (New Zealand) Kirsty Robb | 2:42:47 |
| 24 | (Bermuda) Julia Lesley Hawley | 2:42:47 |
| 25 | (Bermuda) Melanie Claude | 2:42:47 |
| 26 | (England) Sara Symington | 2:42:47 |
| 27 | (Wales) Penny Edwards | 2:42:47 |
| 28 | (England) Sue Carter | 2:42:47 |
| 29 | (New Zealand) Sarah Ulmer | 2:42:48 |
| 30 | (Isle of Man) Jacqui Fletcher | 2:42:49 |
| 31 | (Scotland) Joanne Cavill | 2:44:14 |
| 32 | (Scotland) Katrina Hair | 2:44:14 |
| 33 | (Scotland) Caroline Cook | 2:51:09 |
| 34 | (Isle of Man) Sharon Watterson | 2:52:18 |

Women's road time trial

| Pos | Athlete | Time |
|---|---|---|
| 1 | (Canada) Clara Hughes | 34:51.66 |
| 2 | (Australia) Anna Millward | 35:00:77 |
| 3 | (Canada) Lyne Bessette | 35:10.42 |
| 4 | (Australia) Margaret Hemsley | 35:41.83 |
| 5 | (Australia) Sara Carrigan | 35:43.65 |
| 6 | (New Zealand) Kirsty Robb | 35:47.88 |
| 7 | (Canada) Sue Palmer-Komar | 35:53.14 |
| 8 | (England) Frances Newstead | 36:09.96 |
| 9 | (New Zealand) Melissa Holt | 36:24.81 |
| 10 | (Wales) Nicole Cooke | 37:15.50 |
| 11 | (Scotland) Sally Ashbridge | 37:22.67 |
| 12 | (England) Mel Sears | 38:06.66 |
| 13 | (Scotland) Caroline Cook | 38:07.75 |
| 14 | (Bermuda) Melanie Claude | 38:37.79 |
| 15 | (Bermuda) Julia Lesley Hawley | 38:50.98 |
| 16 | (Wales) Nina Davies | 39:15.59 |
| 17 | (Guernsey) Ann Bowditch | 39:27.15 |
| 18 | (Scotland) Katrina Hair | 39:45.29 |
| 19 | (Isle of Man) Jacqui Fletcher | 40:03.56 |
| 20 | (Isle of Man) Sharon Watterson | 40:29.41 |

=== Track ===
==== Men ====
Men's 1km time trial

Men's sprint

| Pos | Athlete |
|---|---|
| 1 | (Australia) Ryan Bayley |
| 2 | (Australia) Sean Eadie |
| 3 | (Australia) Jobie Dajka |
| 4 | (England) Jamie Staff |
| 5 | (Malaysia) Josiah Ng |
| 6 | (Scotland) Ross Edgar |
| 7 | (England) Andy Slater |
| 8 | (Barbados) Barry Forde |

Quarter finals

- Eadie 11.330/10.990 bt Ng
- Staff 11.360/12/013 bt Slater
- Bayley 10/905/10.600 bt Edgar
- Dajka 10.870 bt Forde 11.035/relegation

Semi finals

- Eadie bt Dajka
- Bayley bt Staff

Bronze

- Dajka bt Staff

Final

- Bayley bt Eadie

Men's 750m team sprint

| Pos | Athlete |
|---|---|
| 1 | (Australia) Jobie Dajka, Sean Eadie, Ryan Bayley |
| 2 | (England) Jason Queally, Andy Slater, Jamie Staff |
| 3 | (Scotland) Ross Edgar, Chris Hoy, Marco Librizzi |
| 4 | (New Zealand) Justin Grace, Anthony Peden, Nathan Seddon |
| 5 | (Canada) Jim Fisher, Steen Madsen, Lars Madsen |
| 6 | (Malaysia) Fairoz Izni Abdul Ghani, Josiah Ng, Ghaffuan Ghazali |
| 7 | (South Africa) Dean Edwards, Jean-Pierre van Zyl, Shawn Lynch |
| 8 | (Trinidad and Tobago) Azikiwe Kellar, Clinton Grant, Michael Phillips |

Semi finals

- New Zealand 46.193 bt Canada 46.694
- Scotland 44.994 bt Malaysia 47.572
- Australia 44.703 bt South Africa 47.738
- England 44.710 bt Trinidad 48.694

Bronze

- Sotland 44.934 bt New Zealand 45.926

Final

- Australia 44.506 bt England 44.772

Men's 4,000m individual pursuit

| Pos | Athlete |
|---|---|
| 1 | (Australia) Bradley McGee |
| 2 | (England) Bradley Wiggins |
| 3 | (England) Paul Manning |
| 4 | (Australia) Luke Roberts |
| 5 | (New Zealand) Hayden Godfrey |
| 6 | (Australia) Peter Dawson |
| 7 | (New Zealand) Hayden Roulston |
| 8 | (England) Kieran Page |

Semi-final round

- Manning 4:21.184 bt Godfrey 4:32.974
- Wiggins 4:19.168 bt Dawson 4:27.539
- McGee 4:18.194 bt Roulston 4:28.878
- Roberts 4:20.086 bt Page 4:38.771

Bronze

- Manning 4:21.813 bt Roberts

Final

- McGee 4:16.358 bt Wiggins

Men's 4,000m team pursuit

| Pos | Athlete |
|---|---|
| 1 | (Australia) Brown, Dawson, Renshaw, Wooldridge |
| 2 | (England) Cummings, Manning, Newton, Steel |
| 3 | (New Zealand) Roulston, Vertongen, Randall, Henderson |
| 4 | (Wales) Sheppard, Ingram-Dodd, Wright, Pritchard |
| 5 | (Scotland) Anderson, Muir, Chapman |

Qualifying

- Australia 4:04.034, England 4:05.003, New Zealand 4:07.824, Wales 4:25.029, Scotland 5:06.133

Semi finals

- Eadie bt Dajka
- Bayley bt Staff

Bronze

- Dajka bt Staff

Final

- Australia 3:59.58 bt England 4:02.665

Men's 20km scratch race

| Pos | Athlete | Time |
|---|---|---|
| 1 | (Australia) Graeme Brown | 24:14.660 |
| 2 | (Wales) Huw Pritchard | |
| 3 | (England) Tony Gibb | |
| 4 | (New Zealand) Lee Vertongen | |
| 5 | (South Africa) Jean-Pierre van Zyl | |
| 6 | (New Zealand) Greg Henderson | |
| 7 | (Australia) Ashley Hutchinson | |
| 8 | (Australia) Mark Renshaw | |
| 9 | (New Zealand) Hayden Godfrey | |
| 10 | (Northern Ireland) Alwyn McMath | |
| 11 | (Isle of Man) Mark Richard Kelly | |
| 12 | (Scotland) Ross Muir | |
| 13 | (Barbados) Carlitos Jones | |
| 14 | (Scotland) Richard Chapman | |
| 15 | (Trinidad and Tobago) Emile Abraham | |
| 16 | (Scotland) James McCallum | |
| 17 | (Wales) Will Wright | |
| 18 | (Wales) Paul Sheppard | |
| 19 | (England) Tim Buckle | |
| 20 | (England) Steve Cummings | |

Men's 40km points race

| Pos | Athlete | Points |
|---|---|---|
| 1 | (New Zealand) Greg Henderson | 35 |
| 2 | (Australia) Mark Renshaw | 37 |
| 3 | (England) Chris Newton | 17 |
| 4 | (Wales) Huw Pritchard | 13 |
| 5 | (South Africa) Jean-Pierre van Zyl | 13 |
| 6 | (New Zealand) Lee Vertongen | 4 |
| 7 | (Isle of Man) Mark Richard Kelly | 4 |
| 8 | (Wales) Paul Sheppard | 3 |
| 9 | (Scotland) Ross Muir | 0 |
| 10 | (Australia) Peter Dawson | 0 |

==== Women ====
Women's Sprint

Women's 500m time trial

Women's 24km points race

Women's 3,000m individual pursuit

| Pos | Athlete |
|---|---|
| 1 | (New Zealand) Sarah Ulmer |
| 2 | (Australia) Katherine Bates |
| 3 | (Australia) Alison Wright |
| 4 | (England) Emma Davies |
| 5 | (England) Sara Symington |
| 6 | (Canada) Clara Hughes |
| 7 | (Canada) Erin Carter |
| 8 | (Canada) Lyne Bessette |

semi-final round

- Davies 3:39.282 bt Hughes 3:40.398
- Wright 3:37.185 bt Carter 3:44.504
- Bates 3:35.305 bt Symington 3:38.128
- Ulmer 3:34.884 bt Bessette 3:49.511

Bronze

- Wright 3:40.409 bt Davies 3:41.019

Final

- Ulmer 3:32.467 bt Bates 3:34.193

=== Mountain biking ===
Men's cross country

| Pos | Athlete | Time |
|---|---|---|
| 1 | (Canada) Roland Green | 1:52:48 |
| 2 | (Canada) Seamus McGrath | 1:53:34 |
| 3 | (England) Liam Killeen | 1:55:34 |
| 4 | (New Zealand) Kashi Leuchs | 1:58:42 |
| 5 | (Australia) Craig Gordon | 1:58:45 |
| 6 | (England) Barrie Clarke | 2:01:31 |
| 7 | (Australia) Josh Fleming | 2:01:36 |
| 8 | (England) Oli Beckingsale | 2:03:42 |
| 9 | (Australia) Paul Rowney | 2:05:08 |
| 10 | (Canada) Geoff Kabush | 2:06:52 |
| 11 | (Wales) Jamie Norfolk | 2:07:50 |
| 12 | (Namibia) Mannie Heymans | 2:10:26 |

Women's cross country

| Pos | Athlete | Time |
|---|---|---|
| 1 | (Canada) Chrissy Redden | 1:32:10 |
| 2 | (New Zealand) Susy Pryde | 1:32:26 |
| 3 | (Australia) Mary Grigson | 1:32:49 |
| 4 | (Canada) Marie-Hélène Prémont | 1:34:06 |
| 5 | (Canada) Kiara Bisaro | 1:37:06 |
| 6 | (Australia) Anna Baylis | 1:38:07 |
| 7 | (Australia) Dellys Franke | 1:38:33 |
| 8 | (England) Sue Thomas | 1:40:46 |
| 9 | (Wales) Penny Edwards | 1:41:53 |
| 10 | (England) Victoria Wilkinson | 1:45:12 |
| 11 | (Isle of Man) Jacqui Fletcher | 1:52:31 |
| 12 | (England) Jenny Copnall | 1:56:13 |
