= Gymnastics at the 2002 Commonwealth Games =

- Venue: Greater Manchester Exhibition Centre (GMEX)
- Location: Manchester, England
- Dates: 25 July to 4 August 2002

Gymnastics at the 2002 Commonwealth Games was the fifth appearance of Gymnastics at the Commonwealth Games. The events were held in Manchester, England, from 25 July to 4 August 2002 and featured contests in 14 events (there were no disciplines in Rhythmic gymnastics).

The gymnastics events were held at the Greater Manchester Exhibition Centre (GMEX).

Australia topped the gymnastics medal table by virtue of winning six gold medals.

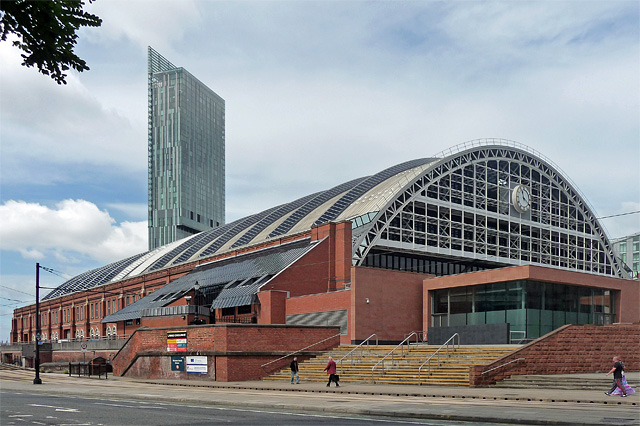
The GMEX centre in 2011

== Medal table ==
* Host nation (England)

Medals won by nation with totals, ranked by number of golds—sortable
Rank	Nation	Gold	Silver	Bronze	Total
1	Australia	6	5	4	15
2	Canada	4	2	6	12
3	England*	3	5	1	9
4	Scotland	1	0	1	2
5	Cyprus	1	0	0	1
6	Malaysia	0	1	1	2
7	South Africa	0	0	1	1
Totals (7 entries)		15	13	14	42

== Medallists ==
Men's Events

Event	Gold	Silver	Bronze
Team	England; Craig Heap; Cuong Thoong; John Smethurst; Kanukai Jackson; Ross Brewer	Canada; Alexander Jeltkov; David Kikuchi; Grant Golding; Kyle Shewfelt; Richard Ikeda	Australia; Damian Istria; Dane Smith; Justin Kok Loong Ng; Pavel Mamine; Philippe Rizzo
All-around	Kanukai Jackson; England	Philippe Rizzo; Australia	Alexander Jeltkov; Canada
Floor exercise	Kyle Shewfelt; Canada	Ng Shu Wai; Malaysia	Philippe Rizzo; Australia
Pommel horse	Philippe Rizzo; Australia	Kanukai Jackson; England	Loke Yik Siang; Malaysia
Rings	Steve Frew; Scotland		Athol Myhill; South Africa
Rings	Herodotos Giorgallas; Cyprus		Athol Myhill; South Africa
Vault	Kyle Shewfelt; Canada	Kanukai Jackson; England	Barry Collie; Scotland
Parallel bars	Philippe Rizzo; Australia	David Kikuchi; Canada	John Smethurst; England
Horizontal bar	Philippe Rizzo; Australia	Damian Istria; Australia	David Kikuchi; Canada

Women's events

Event	Gold	Silver	Bronze
Team	Australia; Alexandra Croak; Allana Slater; Jacqui Dunn; Sarah Lauren; Stephanie Moorhouse	England; Becky Owen; Beth Tweddle; Katy Lennon; Lizzy Line; Nicola Willis	Canada; Danielle Hicks; Heather Purnell; Kate Richardson; Kylie Stone; Vanessa Meloche
All-around	Kate Richardson; Canada	Beth Tweddle; England	Allana Slater; Australia
Vault	Allana Slater; Australia	Alex Croak; Australia	Vanessa Meloche; Canada
Uneven bars	Beth Tweddle; England	Allana Slater; Australia	Vanessa Meloche; Canada
Balance beam	Kate Richardson; Canada	Allana Slater; Australia	Jacqui Dunn; Australia
Floor exercise	Sarah Lauren; Australia	Becky Owen; England	Kylie Stone; Canada

== Men's results ==
=== Team ===
RANK	TEAM	SCORE
1st place, gold medalist(s)	England; Ross Brewer; Craig Heap; Kanukai Jackson; John Smethurst; Cuong Thoong	162.075
2nd place, silver medalist(s)	Canada; Grant Golding; Richard Ikeda; Alexander Jeltkov; David Kikuchi; Kyle Shewfelt	161.350
3rd place, bronze medalist(s)	Australia; Damian Istria; Justin Kok Loong Ng; Pavel Mamine; Philippe Rizzo; Dane Smith	159.100
4.	Scotland	153.275
5.	Malaysia	152.050
6.	India	151.600
7.	South Africa	151.550
8.	Wales	142.525
9.	Cyprus	73.775
9.	Nigeria	59.300

=== All-around ===
RANK	GYMNAST	SCORE
1st place, gold medalist(s)	Kanukai Jackson (ENG)	55.025
2nd place, silver medalist(s)	Philippe Rizzo (AUS)	53.850
3rd place, bronze medalist(s)	Alexander Jeltkov (CAN)	53.650
4.	Ng Shu Wai (MAS)	52.700
5.	Craig Heap (ENG)	52.625
6.	Damian Istria (AUS)	52.450
7.	David Kikuchi (CAN)	51.825
8.	Loke Yik Siang (MAS)	51.000
9.	Dewald Laubscher (RSA)	50.650
10.	Barry Collie (SCO)	50.400
11.	Vikas Pandey (IND)	50.300
12.	Jon Mutch (SCO)	49.950
13.	Shane De Freitas (BAR)	49.300
14.	Mayank Srivastava (IND)	49.000
14.	Courtney Orange (ZIM)	49.000
16.	Steve Frew (SCO)	48.925
17.	Wei Siang Ooi (MAS)	48.850
18.	Gareth Davies (WAL)	48.750
19.	Dean Manning (WAL)	48.650
20.	Daniel Good (NZL)	48.500
21.	Christian Brezeanu (RSA)	48.375
22.	Constantinos Aristotelous (CYP)	46.350
23.	Jaco Mostert (NAM)	44.350
24.	David Muir (WAL)	42.800

=== Floor exercise ===
RANK	GYMNAST	SCORE
1st place, gold medalist(s)	Kyle Shewfelt (CAN)	9.637
2nd place, silver medalist(s)	Shu Wai Ng (MAS)	9.300
3rd place, bronze medalist(s)	Philippe Rizzo (AUS)	9.225
4.	Jason Tucker (WAL)	8.825
5.	Cuong Thoong (ENG)	8.775
6.	Dane Smith (AUS)	8.650
7.	Kanukai Jackson (ENG)	8.100
8.	Grant Golding (CAN)	8.025

=== Pommel horse ===
RANK	GYMNAST	SCORE
1st place, gold medalist(s)	Philippe Rizzo (AUS)	9.162
2nd place, silver medalist(s)	Kanukai Jackson (ENG)	9.087
3rd place, bronze medalist(s)	Loke Yik Siang (MAS)	9.062
4.	Grant Golding (CAN)	8.975
5.	Ross Brewer (ENG)	8.400
6.	Vikas Pandey (IND)	8.312
7.	David Kikuchi (CAN)	8.150
8.	Justin Ng (AUS)	7.550

=== Rings ===
RANK	GYMNAST	SCORE
1st place, gold medalist(s)	Steve Frew (SCO)	9.462
1st place, gold medalist(s)	Herodotos Giorgallas (CYP)	9.462
3rd place, bronze medalist(s)	Athol Myhill (RSA)	9.412
4.	Kanukai Jackson (ENG)	9.325
5.	Pavel Mamin (AUS)	9.225
6.	David Kikuchi (CAN)	9.175
7.	Andreas Kousios (CYP)	9.075
8.	John Smethurst (ENG)	8.662

=== Vault ===
RANK	GYMNAST	SCORE
1st place, gold medalist(s)	Kyle Shewfelt (CAN)	9.443
2nd place, silver medalist(s)	Kanukai Jackson (ENG)	9.281
3rd place, bronze medalist(s)	Barry Collie (SCO)	9.225
4.	Cuong Thoong (ENG)	9.218
5.	Damian Istria (AUS)	9.075
6.	Pavel Mamin (AUS)	9.068
7.	Julian Witbooi (RSA)	8.875
8.	Alexander Jeltkov (CAN)	8.550

=== Parallel bars ===
RANK	GYMNAST	SCORE
1st place, gold medalist(s)	Philippe Rizzo (AUS)	9.375
2nd place, silver medalist(s)	David Kikuchi (CAN)	9.150
3rd place, bronze medalist(s)	John Smethurst (ENG)	9.112
4.	Barry Collie (SCO)	8.850
4.	Kanukai Jackson (ENG)	8.850
6.	Ng Shu Wai (MAS)	8.600
7.	Alexander Jeltkov (CAN)	7.887
8.	Rohit Yadav (IND)	7.675

=== Horizontal bar ===
RANK	GYMNAST	SCORE
1st place, gold medalist(s)	Philippe Rizzo (AUS)	9.512
2nd place, silver medalist(s)	Damian Istria (AUS)	9.075
3rd place, bronze medalist(s)	Alexander Jeltkov (CAN)	8.900
4.	Craig Heap (ENG)	8.862
5.	Kanukai Jackson (ENG)	8.787
6.	Barry Collie (SCO)	8.775
7.	Kyle Shewfelt (CAN)	8.300
8.	Adam Cox (SCO)	7.600

== Women's results ==
=== Team ===
RANK	TEAM	SCORE
1st place, gold medalist(s)	Australia; Alexandra Croak; Jacqui Dunn; Sarah Lauren; Stephanie Moorhouse; Allana Slater	111.325
2nd place, silver medalist(s)	England; Katy Lennon; Lizzy Line; Becky Owen; Beth Tweddle; Nicola Willis	106.900
3rd place, bronze medalist(s)	Canada; Danielle Hicks; Vanessa Meloche; Heather Purnell; Kate Richardson; Kylie Stone	106.800
4.	New Zealand	100.000
5.	Wales	98.925
6.	Scotland	97.925
7.	Northern Ireland	96.050
8.	Trinidad and Tobago	89.325
9.	Bermuda	82.875

=== All-around ===
RANK	GYMNAST	SCORE
1st place, gold medalist(s)	Kate Richardson (CAN)	36.750
2nd place, silver medalist(s)	Beth Tweddle (ENG)	36.387
3rd place, bronze medalist(s)	Allana Slater (AUS)	36.362
4.	Sarah Lauren (AUS)	35.687
5.	Heather Purnell (CAN)	35.400
6.	Nicola Willis (ENG)	35.150
7.	Becky Owen (ENG)	34.900
8.	Kylie Stone (CAN)	34.500
9.	Helen Galashan (SCO)	34.137
10.	Althea Boon (NZL)	33.687
11.	Gayle Campbell (SCO)	33.612
12.	Alexandra Croak (AUS)	33.537
13.	Melanie Roberts (WAL)	33.050
14.	Renay Jones (WAL)	32.750
15.	Nicola Wells (NZL)	32.612
16.	Katie Slader (NIR)	32.600
17.	Victoria Martin (NIR)	32.362
18.	Kate Brocklehurst (NZL)	32.225
19.	Holly Templeton (WAL)	32.075
20.	Lynne Donaghy (SCO)	31.712
21.	Ananda Fraser (TTO)	31.562
22.	Jessica Pouchet (TTO)	30.362
23.	Ruth Cosgrave (NIR)	29.937
24.	Lorraine Moore (NAM)	27.575

=== Vault ===
RANK	GYMNAST	SCORE
1st place, gold medalist(s)	Allana Slater (AUS)	9.262
2nd place, silver medalist(s)	Alexandra Croak (AUS)	9.099
3rd place, bronze medalist(s)	Vanessa Meloche (CAN)	9.093
4.	Kate Richardson (CAN)	8.987
5.	Renay Jones (WAL)	8.962
6.	Althea Boon (NZL)	8.937
7.	Beth Tweddle (ENG)	8.793
8.	Katy Lennon (ENG)	8.987

=== Uneven bars ===
RANK	GYMNAST	SCORE
1st place, gold medalist(s)	Beth Tweddle (ENG)	9.550
2nd place, silver medalist(s)	Allana Slater (AUS)	9.537
3rd place, bronze medalist(s)	Vanessa Meloche (CAN)	9.337
4.	Alexandra Croak (AUS)	9.087
5.	Kylie Stone (CAN)	8.787
6.	Becky Owen (ENG)	8.262
7.	Althea Boon (NZL)	8.237
8.	Helen Galashan (SCO)	7.087

=== Balance beam ===
RANK	GYMNAST	SCORE
1st place, gold medalist(s)	Kate Richardson (CAN)	9.200
2nd place, silver medalist(s)	Allana Slater (AUS)	9.137
3rd place, bronze medalist(s)	Jacqui Dunn (AUS)	8.912
4.	Danielle Hicks (CAN)	8.762
5.	Helen Galashan (SCO)	8.587
6.	Becky Owen (ENG)	8.325
7.	Katie Slader (NIR)	7.987
8.	Nicola Willis (ENG)	7.950

=== Floor exercise ===
RANK	GYMNAST	SCORE
1st place, gold medalist(s)	Sarah Lauren (AUS)	9.412
2nd place, silver medalist(s)	Becky Owen (ENG)	9.237
3rd place, bronze medalist(s)	Kylie Stone (CAN)	9.212
4.	Allana Slater (AUS)	9.187
5.	Katy Lennon (ENG)	9.075
6.	Heather Purnell (CAN)	8.962
7.	Gayle Campbell (SCO)	8.775
8.	Katie Slader (NIR)	8.225

== See also ==
- List of Commonwealth Games medallists in gymnastics
