= Canada at the 2002 Commonwealth Games =

- CG code: CAN
- CGA: Commonwealth Games Canada
- Website: commonwealthgames.ca

in Manchester, England
- Flag bearers: Opening: Closing:
- Medals Ranked 3rdth: Gold 31 Silver 41 Bronze 43 Total 115

Commonwealth Games appearances (overview)
- 1930; 1934; 1938; 1950; 1954; 1958; 1962; 1966; 1970; 1974; 1978; 1982; 1986; 1990; 1994; 1998; 2002; 2006; 2010; 2014; 2018; 2022; 2026; 2030

Other related appearances
- Newfoundland (1930, 1934)

Canada was represented at the 2002 Commonwealth Games by a team that was selected by Commonwealth Games Canada (CGC). Canada is one of only six countries to have competed in all of the Commonwealth Games held since 1930 and was the host nation for the first games (then dubbed the British Empire Games) in Hamilton, Ontario.

At the 2002 Commonwealth games, Canada walked away with a total of 116 medals which placed them 3rd overall behind England and Australia

== Medal results by events ==
Medal	Name	Sport	Event
Gold	Alexandre Despatie	Diving	1 m Springboard
Gold	Alexandre Despatie	Diving	3 m Springboard
Gold	Claire Carver-Dias	Synchronized swimming	Solo
Gold	Claire Carver-Dias & Fanny Létourneau	Synchronized swimming	Duet
Gold	Mark Boswell	Field & Combined	High Jump
Gold	Chantal Petitclerc	Disability events	Women's 800 m wheelchair
Gold	Jean Pascal	Boxing	Light Middleweight 71 kg
Gold	Jason Douglas	Boxing	Heavyweight
Gold	Roland Green	Mountain biking	Men's Cross country
Gold	Chrissy Redden	Mountain biking	Women's Cross country
Gold	Clara Hughes	Road bicycle racing	Women's Individual time trial
Gold	Kate Richardson	Gymnastics	Women's Balance Beam
Gold	Kate Richardson	Gymnastics	Women's All Round Individual
Gold	Kyle Shewfelt	Gymnastics	Men's Floor Exercise
Gold	Kyle Shewfelt	Gymnastics	Men's Vault
Gold	Carolyne Lepage	Judo	Women's u/48 kg
Gold	Nicolas Gill	Judo	Men's u/100 kg
Gold	Metodi Igorov	Shooting	Men's 25 m Rapid Fire Pistol Individual
Gold	Clayton Miller	Shooting	Men's Skeet Individual
Gold	Kim Eagles & Dorothy Ludwig	Shooting	Women's Air Pistol Pairs
Gold	Cynthia Meyer	Shooting	Women's Olympic Trap Individual
Gold	Jonathon Power	Squash	Men's Singles
Gold	Simon Whitfield	Triathlon	1500 m swimming, 40 km road cycling, and 10 km running
Gold	Carol Montgomery	Triathlon	1500 m swimming, 40 km road cycling, and 10 km running
Gold	Maryse Turcotte	Weightlifting	58 kg clean and jerk
Gold	Maryse Turcotte	Weightlifting	58 kg total
Gold	Pascale Dorcelus	Weightlifting	63 kg snatch
Gold	Daniel Igali	Wrestling	74 kg
Gold	Guivi Sissaouri	Wrestling	60 kg
Gold	Dean Schmeichel	Wrestling	96 kg
Gold	Nicholas Ugoalah	Wrestling	84 kg
Silver	Blythe Hartley	Diving	1 m Springboard
Silver	Émilie Heymans	Diving	3 m Springboard
Silver	Émilie Heymans	Diving	10 m Platform
Silver	Philippe Gagnon	Swimming	50 m EAD freestyle
Silver	Mike Mintenko	Swimming	100 m butterfly
Silver	Morgan Knabe	Swimming	100 m breaststroke
Silver	Brian Johns	Swimming	400 m individual medley
Silver	Canadian team	Swimming	Men's 4 × 200 m freestyle relay
Silver	Stéphanie Dixon	Swimming	50 m EAD freestyle
Silver	Stéphanie Dixon	Swimming	100 m EAD freestyle
Silver	Jennifer Carroll	Swimming	50 m backstroke
Silver	Shane Niemi	Track & Road	400 m
Silver	Kwaku Boateng	Field & Combined	High Jump
Silver	Scott Russell	Field & Combined	Javelin Throw
Silver	Jason Tunks	Field & Combined	Discus Throw
Silver	Diane Cummins	Track & Road	800 m
Silver	Andrew Kooner	Boxing	Bantamweight 54 kg
Silver	David Cadieux	Boxing	Super Heavyweight over 91 kg
Silver	Seamus McGrath	Mountain biking	Men's Cross country
Silver	Lori-Ann Muenzer	Track cycling	Women's Sprint 1000 m Individual
Silver	Sue Palmer-Komar	Road bicycle racing	Women's Road Race
Silver	David Kikuchi	Gymnastics	Men's Parallel Bars
Silver	Canadian team	Gymnastics	Men's All Round Team Event
Silver	Catherine Roberge	Judo	Women's u/70 kg
Silver	Keith Morgan	Judo	Men's u/90 kg
Silver	Canadian team	Lawn Bowls	Women's Fours
Silver	Dorothy Hare	Shooting	Women's Air Pistol Individual
Silver	Sharon Bowes & Jacklyn Mecredy	Shooting	Women's Air Rifle Pairs
Silver	Cynthia Meyer & Susan Nattrass	Shooting	Women's Double Trap Pairs
Silver	Wenguan Johnny Huang	Table Tennis	Men's Singles
Silver	Julien Galipeau	Weightlifting	94 kg clean and jerk
Silver	Akos Sandor	Weightlifting	105 kg snatch
Silver	Akos Sandor	Weightlifting	105 kg clean and jerk
Silver	Akos Sandor	Weightlifting	105 kg total
Silver	Karine Turcotte	Weightlifting	48 kg snatch
Silver	Karine Turcotte	Weightlifting	48 kg clean and jerk
Silver	Karine Turcotte	Weightlifting	48 kg total
Silver	Maryse Turcotte	Weightlifting	58 kg snatch
Silver	Eric Ronald Kirschner	Wrestling	120 kg
Silver	Mikheil Japaridze	Wrestling	55 kg
Silver	Graham Neal Ewers	Wrestling	66 kg
Bronze	Alexandre Despatie	Diving	10 m Platform
Bronze	Blythe Hartley	Diving	10 m Platform
Bronze	Benoît Huot	Swimming	50 m EAD freestyle
Bronze	Rick Say	Swimming	200 m freestyle
Bronze	Mike Brown	Swimming	200 m breaststroke
Bronze	Canadian team	Swimming	Men's 4 × 100 m freestyle relay
Bronze	Canadian team	Swimming	Men's 4 × 100 m medley relay
Bronze	Danielle Campo	Swimming	50 m EAD freestyle
Bronze	Kirby Cote	Swimming	100 m EAD freestyle
Bronze	Jennifer Button	Swimming	100 m butterfly
Bronze	Marianne Limpert	Swimming	200 m individual medley
Bronze	Canadian team	Swimming	Women's 4 × 100 m freestyle relay
Bronze	Pierre Browne	Track & Road	100 m
Bronze	Tim Berrett	Track & Road	50 km walk
Bronze	Karlene Haughton	Track & Road	400 m hurdles
Bronze	Nicole Forrester	Field & Combined	High Jump
Bronze	Stephanie McCann	Field & Combined	Pole Vault
Bronze	Sébastien Gauthier	Boxing	Flyweight 51 kg
Bronze	Benoît Gaudet	Boxing	Featherweight 57 kg
Bronze	Michael Walchuk	Boxing	Middleweight 75 kg
Bronze	Lori-Ann Muenzer	Track cycling	Women's 500m Track time trial
Bronze	Clara Hughes	Track cycling	Women's 24 km Points Race
Bronze	Lyne Bessette	Road bicycle racing	Women's Individual time trial
Bronze	Kylie Stone	Gymnastics	Women's Floor Exercise
Bronze	Vanessa Meloche	Gymnastics	Women's Uneven Bars
Bronze	Vanessa Meloche	Gymnastics	Women's Vault
Bronze	Canadian team	Gymnastics	Women's All Round Team Event
Bronze	Alexander Jeltkov	Gymnastics	Men's Horizontal or High Bar
Bronze	Alexander Jeltkov	Gymnastics	Men's All Round Individual
Bronze	Luce Baillargeon	Judo	Women's u/57 kg
Bronze	Jacynthe Maloney	Judo	Women's u/78 kg
Bronze	Daniel Simard	Judo	Men's u/60 kg
Bronze	J-F Marceau	Judo	Men's u/73 kg
Bronze	Vivian Berkeley	Lawn bowls	Women's Singles Blind
Bronze	Susan Nattrass	Shooting	Women's Olympic Trap Individual
Bronze	Susan Nattrass & Cynthia Meyer	Shooting	Women's Olympic Trap Pairs
Bronze	Cynthia Meyer	Shooting	Women's Double Trap Individual
Bronze	Sharon Bowes & Cari Johnson	Shooting	Women's Smallbore Rifle Three positions Pairs
Bronze	Petra Cada, Geng Lijuan, Marie-Christine Roussy & Chris Xu	Table Tennis	Women's Team
Bronze	Scott McCarthy	Weightlifting	77 kg clean and jerk
Bronze	Scott McCarthy	Weightlifting	77 kg total
Bronze	Julien Galipeau	Weightlifting	94 kg total
Bronze	Christine Girard	Weightlifting	63 kg clean and jerk
Bronze	Pascale Dorcelus	Weightlifting	63 kg total

== Netball ==
Canada finished 10th in the netball at the 2002 Commonwealth Games. They lost to Barbados 64–30 in the 9th/10th playoff match.

Pool A

26 July 2002	England	87–26	Canada
18:30	Alex Astle 30; Joanne Steed 22; Abby Teare 18; Jess Garland 17	Report	Dulcina Wind 14; Maralyn Hope 12

27 July 2002	New Zealand	101–17	Canada
13:00	Daneka Wipiiti 39; Donna Loffhagen 34; Irene van Dyk 20/21 (95%); Belinda Colling 8	Report	Maralyn Hope 10; Patricia Carlson 7

29 July 2002	Wales	49–42	Canada
15:00	Mair Jones 37/47 (79%); Sian Edwards 12	Report	Dulcina Wind 23; Maralyn Hope 19

30 July 2002	Canada	52–49	Sri Lanka
15:00	Dulcina Wind 30; Maralyn Hope 22	Report	Sashika Samarasinghe 26 ? Gishanthi Jayakody 12; Prasadi Nalika 10

Table

Pos	Team	P	W	D	L	GF	GA	GD	Pts
1	New Zealand	4	4	0	0	365	101	+264	8
2	England	4	3	0	1	278	145	+133	6
3	Wales	4	2	0	2	138	251	-113	4
4	Canada	4	1	0	3	137	286	-149	2
5	Sri Lanka	4	0	0	4	156	291	-135	0

Qualified for Major semi-finals
Qualified for Minor Semi-finals
Qualified for 7th/10th classification

7th/10th classification

31 July 2002	Fiji	74–39	Canada
15:00	Taraima Rara 30; Matelita Shaw 23; Paulini Tora 16; Maria Bereso 6	Report	Maralyn Hope 22; Dulcina Wind 17

9th/10th playoff

2 August 2002	Barbados	64–30	Canada
11:00	Cheryl Squires 39; Olivia Walcott 21; Laurel Browne 3 ? Harris 1	Report	Dulcina Wind 18; Patricia Carlson 7 Maralyn Hope 5

Squad

Canada roster
Players
Coaches

Name	Pos	DOB	Height	Club	Nat	Caps
Zoe Baldwin			–
Joanne Burns Millar			–
Sharon Butler (cc)	C		–
Patricia Carlson	GS, GA		–
Dana Graf			–
Shawnette Hardware			–
Maria Hodgins			–
Maralyn Hope	GS, GA		–
Shirley Anne McKenzie			–
Emma O'Donnell			–
Shelley Sung			–
Sheryl Thorpe			–
Dulcina Wind (cc)	GS, GA		–

Head coach

- ??

Notes

- (c) – Captain
- (cc) – Co-captain
- (vc) – Vice-captain
- – Injury / maternity leave
- (TRP) – Temporary Replacement Player
