= Cycling at the 2002 Commonwealth Games – Women's 500 m time trial =

Cycling Track – Women's 500 m time trial at the 2002 Commonwealth Games
- Venue: National Cycling Centre
- Dates: 28 July
- Competitors: 7 from 5 nations
- Winning time: 35.084

Medalists
gold medal	Kerrie Meares	Australia
silver medal	Julie Paulding	England
bronze medal	Lori-Ann Muenzer	Canada

The women's 500 m time trial at the 2002 Commonwealth Games, was part of the cycling programme, which took place on 28 July 2002.

== Records ==
Prior to this competition, the existing world and Games records were as follows:

World record	Félicia Ballanger (FRA)	34.010	Bordeaux, France	29 August 1998
Games record	Event not previously held			

== Results ==
Rank	Rider	Time	Behind	Notes
1st place, gold medalist(s)	Kerrie Meares (AUS)	35.084	–	GR
2nd place, silver medalist(s)	Julie Paulding (ENG)	35.448	+0.364	
3rd place, bronze medalist(s)	Lori-Ann Muenzer (CAN)	35.595	+0.511	
4	Anna Meares (AUS)	35.752	+0.668	
5	Victoria Pendleton (ENG)	35.780	+0.696	
6	Fiona Carswell (NZL)	35.922	+0.838	
7	Denise Hampson (WAL)	36.150	+1.066	
