= Swimming at the 2002 Commonwealth Games – Men's 400 metre individual medley =

Men's 400 metre individual medley at the 2002 Commonwealth Games
- Venue: Manchester Aquatics Centre
- Dates: 2 August
- Competitors: 13 from 9 nations
- Winning time: 4:16.95

Medalists
gold medal	Justin Norris	Australia
silver medal	Brian Johns	Canada
bronze medal	Adrian Turner	England

The men's 400 metre individual medley event at the 2002 Commonwealth Games as part of the swimming programme took place on 2 August at the Manchester Aquatics Centre in Manchester, England.

== Records ==
Prior to this competition, the existing world and games records were as follows.

World record	(United States) Tom Dolan	4:11.76	Sydney, Australia	17 September 2000
Games record	(Australia) Matthew Dunn	4:17.01	Victoria, Canada	

== Schedule ==
The schedule was as follows:

All times are local time

Date	Time	Round
Friday 2 August	11:49	Heats
Friday 2 August	20:15	Final

== Results ==
=== Heats ===
The 8 fastest swimmers in the heats qualified for the final.

Rank	Heat	Lane	Name	Nationality	Time	Notes
1	2	4	Brian Johns	Canada	4:20.85	Q
2	2	6	Carlos Sayao	Canada	4:21.21	Q
3	2	5	Justin Norris	Australia	4:21.72	Q
4	2	3	Dean Kent	New Zealand	4:22.25	Q
5	1	5	Terence Parkin	South Africa	4:22.67	Q
6	2	2	Adrian Turner	England	4:23.51	Q
7	1	3	Grant McGregor	Australia	4:24.40	Q
8	1	3	Curtis Myden	Canada	4:24.44	Q
9	1	7	Jeremy Knowles	Bahamas	4:25.77	
10	1	6	Simon Militis	England	4:27.65	
11	1	2	David Carry	Scotland	4:32.76	
12	2	1	George Demetriades	Cyprus	4:37.58	
13	1	1	Ben Lowndes	Guernsey	4:55.51	

=== Final ===
The final was held on 2 August at 20:15.

Grant McGregor did not participate in the final despite qualifying, and so Jeremy Knowles took the spot instead.

Rank	Lane	Name	Nationality	Time	Notes
1st place, gold medalist(s)	3	Justin Norris	Australia	4:16.95	GR
2nd place, silver medalist(s)	4	Brian Johns	Canada	4:17.41	
3rd place, bronze medalist(s)	7	Adrian Turner	England	4:18.75	
4	6	Dean Kent	New Zealand	4:19.84	
5	1	Curtis Myden	Canada	4:19.86	
6	2	Terence Parkin	South Africa	4:21.05	
7	5	Carlos Sayao	Canada	4:21.66	
8	8	Jeremy Knowles	Bahamas	4:26.81	
