= England at the 2002 Commonwealth Games =

- CG code: ENG
- CGA: Commonwealth Games England
- Website: weareengland.org

in Manchester, England
- Competitors: 444
- Flag bearers: Darren Campbell (opening); Karen Pickering (closing)
- Officials: 221
- Medals Ranked 2nd: Gold 54 Silver 50 Bronze 60 Total 164

Commonwealth Games appearances (overview)
- 1930; 1934; 1938; 1950; 1954; 1958; 1962; 1966; 1970; 1974; 1978; 1982; 1986; 1990; 1994; 1998; 2002; 2006; 2010; 2014; 2018; 2022; 2026; 2030

England at the 2002 Commonwealth Games was the 17th appearance of the nation at the Commonwealth Games. The Games were held in Manchester, England, from 25 July to 4 August 2002.

England joined the Commonwealth of Nations as part of the United Kingdom in 1931.

The team that attended the games in Manchester was the largest fielded up to that point, comprising 444 competitors and 221 officials. England finished second in the medal table behind Australia with 54 gold medals, 51 silver medals and 60 bronze medals.

== Medal table (top three) ==
Rank	Nation	Gold	Silver	Bronze	Total
1	Australia	82	62	63	207
2	England	54	50	60	164
3	Canada	31	41	44	116
Totals (3 entries)		167	153	167	487

== Medallists ==
=== Gold ===
Athletics:

Steve Backley, men's javelin
Michael East, men's 1500 m
Jonathan Edwards, men's triple jump
Ashia Hansen, women's triple jump
Kelly Holmes, women's 1500 m
Michael Jones, men's hammer throw
Nathan Morgan, men's long jump
Paula Radcliffe, women's 5000 m
Chris Rawlinson, 400 m hurdles
Lorraine Shaw, women's hammer throw
Darren Campbell, Allyn Condon, Marlon Devonish & Jason Gardener, men's 4x100 m relay
Sean Baldock, Daniel Caines, Jared Deacon, Chris Rawlinson, men's 4x400 m relay

Badminton:

Simon Archer & Joanne Goode, mixed doubles
James Anderson, Simon Archer, Robert Blair, Anthony Clark, Mark Constable, Gail Emms, Joanne Goode, Tracey Hallam, Colin Haughton, Donna Kellogg, Julia Mann, Ella Miles, Nathan Robertson & Sara Sankey, team

Boxing:

Darren Barker, light welterweight 63.5 kg
David Dolan, super heavyweight 81 kg

Diving:

Peter Waterfield, men's 10 m platform

Gymnastics:

Kanukai Jackson, men's individual all-around
Beth Tweddle, women's uneven bars
Ross Brewer, Craig Heap, Kanukai Jackson, John Smethurst, Cuong Thoong, men's team all-around

Judo:

Simone Callender, women's 78kg+
Craig Fallon, men's 60 kg
Winston Gordon, men's 90 kg
Warren James, men's 66 kg
Samantha Lowe, women's 70 kg
Karen Roberts, women's 63 kg
Michelle Rogers, women's 78 kg
Georgina Singleton, women's 52 kg

Lawn bowls:

Ruth Small, women's blind
David Holt, Robert Newman, John Ottaway & Simon Skelton, men's fours
Ellen Alexander, Carol Duckworth, Gill Mitchell & Shirley Page, women's fours

Shooting:

Mick Gault, men's 10 m air pistol
Mick Gault, men's 50 m pistol
Charlotte Kerwood, women's double trap
Nicholas Baxter & Mick Gault, men's 10 m air pistol pairs
Mike Babb & Neil Day, men's 50 m rifle prone pairs

Squash:

Lee Beachill & Peter Nicol, men's doubles

Swimming:

Zoë Baker, women's 50 m breaststroke
Rebecca Cooke, women's 400 m freestyle
Rebecca Cooke, women's 800 m freestyle
James Gibson, men's 50 m breaststroke
James Goddard, men's 200 m backstroke
Karen Pickering, women's 200 m freestyle
Sarah Price, women's 100 m backstroke
Sarah Price, women's 200 m backstroke
Adam Whitehead, men's 100 m breaststroke
Jo Fargus, Georgina Lee, Karen Legg & Karen Pickering, women's 4x200 freestyle relay

Table tennis:

Sue Gilroy, women's singles EAD
Andrew Baggaley & Gareth Herbert, men's doubles
Andrew Baggaley, Alex Parry, Matthew Syed, Terry Young & Gareth Herbert, men's team

Weightlifting:

Giles Greenwood, men's +105 kg snatch
Delroy McQueen, men's 105 kg snatch
Delroy McQueen, men's 105 kg clean and jerk
Delroy McQueen, men's 105 kg overall

=== Silver ===
Athletics:

Marlon Devonish, men's 200 m
Phillips Idowu, men's triple jump
Jade Johnson, women's long jump
Susan Jones, women's high jump
Lisa Kehler, women's 20 km walk
Helen Frost, Helen Karagounis, Lisa Miller & Melanie Purkiss, women's 4x400 m relay

Badminton:

Tracey Hallam, women's singles

Boxing:

Steven Birch, middleweight 75 kg
Darran Langley, light flyweight 48 kg
Paul Smith, light middleweight 71 kg

Cycling:

Julie Paulding, women's 500 m time trial
Jason Queally, men's 1000 m time trial
Bradley Wiggins, men's 4000 m individual pursuit
Paul Manning, Chris Newton, Bryan Steel & Bradley Wiggins, men's 4000 m team pursuit
Jason Queally, Andy Slater & Jamie Staff, men's 750 m team sprint

Diving:

Tony Ally, men's 1 m springboard
Tony Ally, men's 3 m springboard
Leon Taylor, men's 10 m platform

Gymnastics:

Kanukai Jackson, men's pommel horse
Kanukai Jackson, men's vault
Beth Owen, women's floor
Beth Tweddle, women's individual all-around
Katy Lennon, Lizzy Line, Becky Owen, Beth Tweddle & Nicola Willis, women's team all-around

Hockey:

Anna Bennett, Jennie Bimson, Sarah Blanks, Melanie Clewlow, Joanne Ellis, Helen Grant, Frances Houslop, Leisa King, Mandy Nicholson, Carolyn Reid, Helen Richardson, Hilary Rose, Jane Smith, Rachel Walker, Kate Walsh & Lucilla Wright, women's hockey

Judo:

Thomas Cousins, men's 81 kg
Sam Delahay, men's 100 kg
Clare Lynch, women's 48 kg
Daniel Sargent, men's +100 kg

Lawn bowls:

Stephen Farish & Dean Morgan, men's pairs

Shooting:

Mike Babb, men's 50 m rifle prone
Anita North, women's trap
Jason Burrage & Chris Hector, men's 50 m rifle 3 positions pairs
Christopher Dean & Ian Peel, men's trap pairs
Lesley Goddard & Anita North, women's trap pairs

Note: Due to there only being three pairs of competitors in the women's skeet pairs, only the gold medal was awarded. So whilst the pairing of Susan Bramley & Pinky le Grelle did finish in second, they did not receive the silver medal.

Squash:

Peter Nicol, men's singles
Tania Bailey & Cassie Jackman, women's doubles

Swimming:

Jo Fargus, women's 200 m backstroke
Georgina Lee, women's 200 m butterfly
Karen Legg, women's 200 m freestyle
Stephen Parry, men's 200 m butterfly
Adrian Turner, men's 200 m individual medley
Adam Whitehead, men's 50 m breaststroke
James Hickman, Matt Kidd, Adam Ruckwood & Adam Whitehead, men's 4x100 m medley relay
Rosalind Brett, Karen Legg, Melanie Marshall & Karen Pickering, women's 4x100 m freestyle relay

Synchronised swimming:

Gayle Adamson, synchronised swimming solo
Gayle Adamson & Katie Hooper, synchronised swimming duet

Weightlifting:

Anthony Arthur, men's 85 kg combined
Anthony Arthur, men's 85 kg snatch
Giles Greenwood, men's +105 kg combined
David Guest, men's 94 kg combined
David Guest, men's 94 kg snatch

=== Bronze ===
Athletics:

Darren Campbell, men's 200 m
Ben Challenger, men's high jump
Paul Head, men's hammer throw
Irie Hill, women's pole vault
Kelly Morgan, women's javelin
Carl Myerscough, men's shot put
Shelley Newman, women's discus
Nick Nieland, men's javelin
Helen Pattinson, women's 1500 m
Bob Weir, men's discus
Shani Anderson, Vernicha James, Joice Maduaka & Abi Oyepitan, women's 4x100 m relay

Badminton:

James Anderson & Simon Archer, men's doubles (with Clark and Robertson, no third-place play-off)
Anthony Clark & Nathan Robertson, men's doubles (with Anderson and Archer, no third-place play-off)
Anthony Clark & Sara Sankey, mixed doubles
Gail Emms & Joanne Goode, women's doubles

Boxing:

Mark Moran, bantamweight 54 kg
Andy Morris, lightweight 60 kg

Cycling:

Tony Gibb, men's 20 km scratch race
Rachel Heal, women's road race
Liam Killeen, men's cross country
Paul Manning, men's 4000 m individual pursuit
Chris Newton, men's points race
Jamie Staff, men's 1000 m time trial

Diving:

Jane Smith, women's 1 m springboard
Jane Smith, women's 3 m springboard

Gymnastics:

John Smethurst, men's parallel bars

Judo:

Sophie Cox, women's 57 kg

Lawn bowls:

Amy Gowshall & Lynne Whitehead, women's pairs

Shooting:

Mick Gault, men's 25 m standard pistol
Louise Minett, women's 10 m air rifle
Chris Hector & Nigel Wallace, men's 10 m air rifle pairs
John Bellamy & Richard Faulds, men's double trap pairs
Richard Brickell & Drew Harvey, men's skeet pairs
Glyn Barnett & Jane Messer, open full bore rifle pairs
Victoria Eaton & Louise Minett, women's 10 m air rifle pairs
Linda Smallbone & Helen Vincent, women's 50 m rifle prone pairs

Squash:

Cassie Jackman, women's singles
Mark Chaloner & Paul Johnson, men's doubles
Fiona Geaves & Chris Walker, mixed doubles
Linda Charman & Fiona Geaves, women's doubles

Swimming:

Mark Foster, men's 50 m butterfly
Mark Foster, men's 50 m freestyle
James Gibson, men's 100 m breaststroke
James Goddard, men's 200 m individual medley
James Hickman, men's 200 m butterfly
Karen Legg, women's 100 m freestyle
Darren Mew, men's 50 m breaststroke
Simon Militis, men's 200 m backstroke
Margaretha Pedder, women's 200 m butterfly
Sarah Price, women's 50 m backstroke
Katy Sexton, women's 200 m backstroke
Adrian Turner, men's 400 m individual medley
Simon Burnett, Adam Faulkner, Stephen Parry & James Salter, men's 4x200 m freestyle relay
Kate Haywood, Georgina Lee, Karen Legg & Sarah Price, women's 4x100 m medley relay

Table tennis:

Cathy Mitton, women's singles EAD

Weightlifting:

Anthony Arthur, men's 85 kg clean and jerk
Gurbinder Cheema, men's 105 kg snatch
Stewart Cruickshank, men's 96 kg combined
Karl Grant, men's 94 kg clean and jerk
Giles Greenwood, men's 105 kg clean and jerk

== Sports and competitors ==
=== Athletics ===
Men

Athlete	Events	Club
Mark Awanah	long jump	
Richard Aspden	high jump	
Steve Backley	javelin	
Sean Baldock	400m, 4x400m relay	
Dominic Bannister	marathon	
William Beauchamp	hammer	
Anthony Borsumato	400m hurdles	
Gareth Brown	50km walk	
Nick Buckfield	pole vault	
Daniel Caines	400m, 4x400m relay	
Darren Campbell	200m, 4x100m relay	
Ben Challenger	high jump	
Dwain Chambers	100m	
Allyn Condon	4x100m relay	
Patrick Davoren	steeplechase	
Jared Deacon	400m, 4x400m relay	
Marlon Devonish	200m, 4x100m relay	
Robert Denmark	10,000m	
Matthew Douglas	400 hurdles	
Michael East	1500m	
Mark Easton	50km walk	
Jonathan Edwards	triple jump	
Mensah Elliott	110m hurdles	
Jason Gardener	100, 4x100m relay	
Dalton Grant	high jump	
Damien Greaves	11om hurdles	
Stuart Hall	marathon	
Samuel Haughian	5000m	
Paul Head	hammer	
John Heanley	decathlon	
Cori Henry	4x400m relay	
Steven Hollier	50km walk	
Ian Hudspith	10,000m	
Mark Hudspith	marathon	
Kevin Hughes	pole vault	
Mark Hylton	4x400m relay	
Phillips Idowu	triple jump	
Tony Jarrett	110m hurdles	
Mick Jones	hammer	
Joel Kidger	600m	
Chris Lambert	200m	
Mark Lewis-Francis	100m	
Tom Mayo	1500m	
John Mayock	5000m	
Nathan Morgan	long jump	
Carl Myerscough	shot put	
Nick Nieland	javelin	
Matt O'Dowd	5000m	
Tosin Oke	triple jump	
Mark Proctor	shot put	
Chris Rawlinson	400 hurdles, 4x400m relay	
Mark Roberson	javelin	
Curtis Robb	800m	
Anthony Sawyer	decathlon	
Glen Smith	discus	
Neil Speaight	800m	
Stuart Stokes	steeplechase	
Barry Thomas	decathlon	
Chris Tomlinson	long jump	
Emeka Udechuku	discus, shot put	
Robert Weir	discus	
Ben Whitby	steeplechase	
Anthony Whiteman	1500m	
Jon Wild	10,000m	
Paul Williamson	pole vault	

Women

Athlete	Events	Club
Diane Allahgreen	100m hurdles	
Shani Anderson	100m, 200m, 4x100m relay	
Catherine Berry	5000m	
Tasha Danvers	400m hurdles	
Tracey Duncan	400m hurdles	
Joanne Fenn	800m	
Amanda Forrester	100m	
Emily Freeman	200m	
Helen Frost	400m, 4x400m relay	
Kerry Gillibrand	1500m	
Ashia Hansen	triple jump	
Bev Hartigan	marathon	
Irie Hill	pole vault	
Kelly Holmes	1500m	
Vernicha James	4x100m relay	
Jade Johnson	long jump	
Katie Jones	400m hurdles	
Susan Jones	high jump	
Helen Karagounis	400m, 4x400m relay	
Lisa Kehler	20km walk	
Becky Lyne	800m	
Joice Maduaka	200m, 4x100m relay	
Jenny Meadows	4x400m relay	
Niobe Menendez	20km walk	
Lisa Miller	4x400m relay	
Charlotte Moore	800m	
Kelly Morgan	javelin	
Shelley Newman	discus	
Abi Oyepitan	100m, 4x100m relay	
Helen Pattinson	1500m	
Jo Pavey	5000m	
Julie Pratt	100m hurdles	
Melanie Purkiss	400m, 4x400m relay	
Paula Radcliffe	5000m	
Debbie Robinson	marathon	
Lorraine Shaw	hammer throw	
Marian Sutton	marathon	
Sharon Tonks	20km walk	
Melanie Wilkins	100m hurdles	
Jo Wilkinson	10,000m	
Liz Yelling	10,000m	
Hayley Yelling	10,000m	

=== Badminton ===
Men

Athlete	Events
James Anderson	men's doubles
Simon Archer	men's doubles, mixed doubles
Robert Blair	mixed doubles
Anthony Clark	men's doubles, mixed doubles
Mark Constable	singles
Colin Haughton	singles, team
Nathan Robertson	men's doubles, mixed doubles, team

Women

Athlete	Events
Gail Emms	women's doubles, mixed doubles, team
Joanne Goode	women's doubles, mixed doubles, team
Tracey Hallam	singles, team
Donna Kellogg	mixed doubles
Julia Mann	singles
Sara Sankey	mixed doubles

=== Boxing ===
Men only

Athlete	Events	Club
Darren Barker	63.5kg light-welterweight	Repton Boys Club
Stephen Bell	57kg featherweight	Louverlite ABC, Hyde
Steven Birch	75kg middleweight	St Helens Town ABC
David Dolan	+91kg super heavyweight	Plains Farm ABC, Sunderland
Courtney Fry	81kg light-heavyweight	Salisbury ABC, Liverpool
Daniel Happe	67kg welterweight	Repton Boys Club
David Haye	91kg heavyweight	Broad Street ABC, London
Darran Langley	48kg lightweight	Hollington ABC, London
Matthew Marsh	51kg flyweight	West Ham ABC, London
Mark Moran	54kg bantamweight	Golden Gloves ABC, Liverpool
Andy Morris	60kg lightweight	West Wythenshawe ABC
Paul Smith	71kg light-middleweight	Rotunda ABC, Liverpool

=== Cycling ===
Men

Athlete	Events
Oli Beckingsale	mountain bike
Tim Buckle	scratch
Barrie Clarke	mountain bike
Steve Cummings	scratch, team pursuit
Stuart Dangerfield	road TT
Tony Gibb	scratch, points
Roger Hammond	road race
Liam Killeen	mountain bike
Mark Lovatt	road race
Paul Manning	pursuit, team pursuit
Chris Newton	team pursuit, points
Kieran Page	pursuit
Jason Queally	kilo TT, team sprint
Max Sciandri	road race
Andy Slater	sprint, team sprint
Jamie Staff	kilo TT, sprint, team sprint
Bryan Steel	points, team pursuit
John Tanner	road race
Charly Wegelius	road race, road TT
Bradley Wiggins	pursuit, team pursuit

Women

Athlete	Events
Sue Carter	road race
Jenny Copnall	mountain bike
Emma Davies	road race, pursuit
Rachel Heal	road race, points
Frances Newstead	road race, road TT, points
Julie Paulding	500 TT
Victoria Pendleton	500 TT, sprint
Mel Sears	road race, road TT
Sara Symington	road race, pursuit
Melanie Szubrycht	points, sprint
Sue Thomas	mountain bike
Victoria Wilkinson	mountain bike

=== Diving ===
Men

Athlete	Events
Tony Ally	1m, 3m springboard
Mark Shipman	1m, 3m springboard
Leon Taylor	10m platform
Peter Waterfield	10m platform, 1m, 3m springboard

Women

Athlete	Events
Stacie Powell	10m platform
Jane Smith	1m, 3m springboard
Karen Smith	10m platform
Sarah Soo	1m, 3m springboard

=== Gymnastics ===
Men

Athlete	Events
Ross Brewer	pommel horse, team
Craig Heap	all-around, horizontal bar, team
Kanukai Jackson	all-around, floor, horizontal bar, parallel bars, pommel horse, rings, vault, team
John Smethurst	parallel bars, rings, team
Cuong Thoong	floor, vault, team

Women

Athlete	Events
Katy Lennon	floor, vault, team
Lizzy Line	team
Becky Owen	all-around, beam, floor, uneven bars, team
Beth Tweddle	all-around, uneven bars, vault, team
Nicola Willis	all-around, beam, team

=== Hockey ===
Men

Athlete	Club
Jason Collins	Guildford
Brett Garrard	Surbiton
Jerome Goudie	Loughborough Students
Danny Hall	Guildford
Michael Johnson	Cannock
Jimi Lewis	Cannock
Simon Mason	Reading
David Mathews	Canterbury
Mark Pearn	Reading
Craig Parnham	Cannock
Jon Peckett	Southgate
Robert Todd	Reading
Jimmy Wallis	Surbiton
Bill Waugh	Surbiton
Malcolm Wood	Head coach
Duncan Woods	Southgate
Jon Wyatt	Reading

Women

Athlete	Club
Anna Bennett	Canterbury
Jennie Bimson	Leicester
Sarah Blanks	Leicester
Melanie Clewlow	Canterbury
Joanne Ellis	Ipswich
Helen Grant	Olton
Frances Houslop	Canterbury
Leisa King	Ipswich
Mandy Nicholson	Slough
Carolyn Reid	Bowdon Hightown
Helen Richardson	Leicester
Hilary Rose	Canterbury
Jane Smith	Slough
Rachel Walker	Olton
Kate Walsh	Slough
Lucilla Wright	Olton

=== Judo ===
Men

Athlete	Event
Lee Burbridge	73 kg
Thomas Cousins	81 kg
Sam Delahay	100 kg
Craig Fallon	60 kg
Winston Gordon	90 kg
Daniel Sargent	+100 kg
James Warren	66 kg

Women

Athlete	Event
Simone Callender	+78 kg
Sophie Cox	57 kg
Samantha Lowe	70 kg
Clare Lynch	48 kg
Karen Roberts	63 kg
Michelle Rogers	78 kg
Georgina Singleton	52 kg

=== Lawn bowls ===
Men

Athlete	Events	Club
Stephen Farish	pairs	
David Holt	fours	
Mervyn King	singles	
Dean Morgan	pairs	
John Ottaway	fours	
Robert Newman	fours	
Simon Skelton	fours	

Women

Athlete	Events	Club
Ellen Alexander	fours	
Jean Baker	singles	
Carol Duckworth	fours	
Amy Gowshall	pairs	
Gill Mitchell	fours	
Shirley Page	fours	
Lynne Whitehead	pairs	

=== Netball ===
Women only

With a team captained by Olivia Murphy and coached by Lyn Gunson, England finished fourth in the netball at the 2002 Commonwealth Games. They lost to Jamaica 55–53 in the bronze medal match.

Pool A

26 July 2002	England	87–26	Canada
18:30	Alex Astle 30; Joanne Steed 22; Abby Teare 18; Jess Garland 17	Report	Dulcina Wind 14; Maralyn Hope 12

27 July 2002	England	75–34	Sri Lanka
18:30	Alex Astle 31/41 (76%); Jess Garland 25; Joanne Steed 19	Report	Sashika Samarasinghe 13; Prasadi Nalika 12; Gishanthi Jayakody 8 Anoma Sriyakanthi 1

28 July 2002	England	81–18	Wales
20:30	Alex Astle 42/66 (64%); Abby Teare 39/48 (81%)	Report	Sian Edwards 8 Mair Jones 6 ?? 2

29 July 2002	England	35–67	New Zealand
20:30	Abby Teare 22; Alex Astle 13	Report	Irene van Dyk 44/48 (92%); Donna Loffhagen 15; Belinda Colling 8

Table

Pos	Team	P	W	D	L	GF	GA	GD	Pts
1	New Zealand	4	4	0	0	365	101	+264	8
2	England	4	3	0	1	278	145	+133	6
3	Wales	4	2	0	2	138	251	-113	4
4	Canada	4	1	0	3	137	286	-149	2
5	Sri Lanka	4	0	0	4	156	291	-135	0

Qualified for Major semi-finals
Qualified for Minor Semi-finals
Qualified for 7th/10th classification

Minor semi-finals

31 July 2002	England	55–40	South Africa
21:00	Abby Teare 29/39 (74%); Joanne Steed 16; Alex Astle 10	Report	Sindiswe Gumede 28; Martha Machoga 12

Major semi-finals

2 August 2002	Australia	49–38	England
20:30	Eloise Southby 28; Sharelle McMahon 15; Jacqui Delaney 6		Joanne Steed 19; Abby Teare 17; Alex Astle 2

Bronze medal match

4 August 2002	Jamaica	55–53	England
11:00	Elaine Davis 42; Simone Forbes 13		Alex Astle 32/38 (84%); Abby Teare 21	Attendance: 10,000

Squad

England roster
Players
Coaches

Name	Pos	DOB	Height	Club	Nat	Caps
Karen Aspinall	WA, C	7 June 1978 (aged 24)	1.68 m (5 ft 6 in)	Birmingham Blaze
Alex Astle	GA, GS	19 March 1972 (aged 30)	–	Birmingham Blaze
Pamela Cookey	GA, GS, WA	2 September 1984 (aged 17)	1.78 m (5 ft 10 in)	Team Bath Force
Jess Garland	WA, GA	15 November 1979 (aged 22)	1.76 m (5 ft 9 in)	Team Bath Force
Geva Mentor	GK, GD	17 September 1984 (aged 17)	1.88 m (6 ft 2 in)	Team Bath Force
Sonia Mkoloma	GD, GK	17 January 1979 (aged 23)	1.86 m (6 ft 1 in)	London Tornadoes
Olivia Murphy (c)	C, WA	24 April 1977 (aged 25)	–	Northern Flames
Fiona Murtagh	C, WD	30 April 1967 (aged 35)	–	London Hurricanes
Tracey Neville	WA, GA	21 January 1977 (aged 25)	1.73 m (5 ft 8 in)	Northern Thunder
Amanda Newton (vc)	GD, WD, GK	8 April 1977 (aged 25)	–	Northern Thunder
Naomi Siddall	GD, GK	2 April 1975 (aged 27)	1.82 m (6 ft 0 in)	London Hurricanes
Joanne Steed	GS	20 March 1975 (aged 27)	1.84 m (6 ft 0 in)	London Tornadoes
Abby Teare	GA, GS	25 May 1977 (aged 25)	1.81 m (5 ft 11 in)	London Hurricanes

Head coach

- Lyn Gunson

Assistant coach

- Waimarama Taumaunu

Notes

- (c) – Captain
- (cc) – Co-captain
- (vc) – Vice-captain
- – Injury / maternity leave
- (TRP) – Temporary Replacement Player

=== Rugby sevens ===
Men only

Athlete	Club
Simon Amor	Gloucester Rugby
Geoff Appleford	London Irish
Nick Duncombe	Harlequins
Ben Gollings	Harlequins
Phil Greening	Wasps RFC
Josh Lewsey	Wasps RFC
Henry Paul	Gloucester Rugby
Tony Roques	Saracens
Marcus St Hilaire	Leeds Rhinos
Paul Sampson	Wasps RFC
Pat Sanderson	Harlequins
Rob Thirlby	Bath Rugby

=== Shooting ===
Men

Athlete	Events
Michael Babb	50m rifle prone, pair
Glyn Barnett	fulbore rifle Qeens's prize pair, pairs
Nick Baxter	10m air pistol, pair
John Bellamy	double trap, pair
Richard Brickell	skeet, pair
Jason Burrage	50m rifle 3-Pos, pair
Peter Clark	25m standard pistol, pair, rapid fire pistol, pair
Christopher Simon Dean	trap, pair
Neil Day	50m rifle prone, pair
Richard Faulds	double trap, pair
Peter Flippant	centre fire pistol, pair
Mick Gault	10m air pistol, pair, 25m standard pistol, pair, 50m free pistol, pair
Drew Harvey	skeet, pair
Chris Hector	10m air rifle, pair, 50m rifle 3-Pos, pair
Simon Ulrick Lucas	centre fire pistol, pair
Leslie Pearson	rapid fire pistol, pair
Ian Peel	trap, pair
Nigel Wallace	10m air rifle, pair
Frank Wyatt	50m free pistol, pair

Women

Athlete	Events
Barbara Barber	25m sport pistol, pair
Susan Bramley	skeet, pair
Victoria Eaton	10m air rifle, pair
Lesley Goddard	trap, pair
Claire Griffin	50m rifle 3-pos, pair
Charlotte Kerwood	double trap, pair
Pinky le Grelle	skeet, pair
Jane Messer	fulbore rifle Qeens's prize pair, pairs
Louise Minett	10m air rifle, pair
Anita North	trap, pair
Kathryn Pearson	10m air pistol, pair
Helen Preston	10m air pistol, pair, 25m sport pistol, pair
Helen Slack	double trap, pair
Linda Smallbone	50m rifle prone, pair
Rebecca Spicer	50m rifle 3-pos, pair
Helen Vincent	50m rifle prone, pair

=== Squash ===
Men

Athlete	Events
Lee Beachill	singles, men's doubles
Mark Chaloner	singles, men's doubles
Paul Johnson	men's doubles, mixed doubles
Peter Nicol	singles, men's doubles
Chris Walker	singles, mixed doubles

Women

Athlete	Events
Tania Bailey	singles, women's doubles
Stephanie Brind	singles, mixed doubles
Fiona Geaves	women's doubles, mixed doubles
Linda Charman	singles, women's doubles
Cassie Jackman	singles, women's doubles

=== Swimming ===
Men

Athlete	Events
David Bennett	50, 100m Butterfly
Simon Burnett	50, 100m Backstroke, 4x200 relay
Chris Cozens	50, 100m Freestyle, 4x100 relay
Adam Faulkner	400, 1500m Freestyle, 4x200 relay
Mark Foster	50m Butterfly, 50m freestyle
James Gibson	50, 100m Breaststroke
James Goddard	200m Backstroke, 200m medley
Martin Harris	50, 100m Backstroke
James Hickman	50, 100,200m Butterfly, medley relay
Anthony Howard	100m Freestyle, 4x100 relay
Matthew Kidd	50, 100m Freestyle, 4x100 relay, medley relay
Darren Mew	50,100m Breaststroke
Simon Militis	200m Backstroke, 400 medley
Steve Parry	100,200m Butterfly, 4x200 relay
Adam Ruckwood	50, 100m Backstroke, 4x100 relay, medley relay
James Salter	200, 400m Freestyle, 4x200 relay
Stuart Trees	400, 1500m Freestyle
Adrian Turner	200m Breaststroke, 200,400m medley
Adam Whitehead	50, 100,200m Breaststroke, medley relay

Women

Athlete	Events
Zoe Baker	50m Breaststroke
Janine Belton	200m Freestyle
Rosalind Brett	50m Butterfly, 50m Freestyle, 4x100 relay
Nathalie Brown	800m Freestyle
Rebecca Cooke	400, 800m Freestyle
Heidi Earp	100,200m Breaststroke
Kathryn Evans	200,400m medley
Joanna Fargus	200m Backstroke, 4x200 relay
Holly Fox	200,400m medley
Kate Haywood	50,100m Breaststroke, medley relay
Jaime King	100,200m Breaststroke
Georgina Lee	50, 100,200m Butterfly, 4x200 relay, medley relay
Karen Legg	100,200m Freestyle, 4x100 relay, 4x200 relay, medley relay
Melanie Marshall	50, 100m Freestyle, 4x100 relay
Joanne Mullins	200m Individual Medley
Margie Pedder	100,200m Butterfly
Karen Pickering	100,200m Freestyle, 4x100 relay, 4x200 relay
Sarah Price	50, 100,200m Backstroke, medley relay
Caroline Saxby	400, 800m Freestyle
Katy Sexton	50,100,200m Backstroke
Sarah Whewell	50m Freestyle

=== Synchronised swimming ===
Women only

Athlete	Events
Gayle Adamson	solo, duet
Katie Hooper	duet

=== Table tennis ===
Men

Athlete	Events
Andrew Baggaley	singles, men's doubles, mixed doubles
Gareth Herbert	singles, men's doubles, mixed doubles
Alex Perry	singles, men's doubles, mixed doubles
Matthew Syed	singles, mixed doubles
Terry Young	singles, men's doubles

Women

Athlete	Events
Nicola Deaton	singles, mixed doubles
Helen Lower	singles, mixed doubles
Katy Parker	singles, mixed doubles
Kate Steward	singles, women's doubles,
Georgina Walker	singles, women's doubles, mixed doubles

=== Triathlon ===
Men

Athlete	Club
Stuart Hayes	
Andrew Johns	
Simon Lessing	

Women

Athlete	Club
Julie Dibens	
Michelle Dillon	
Jodie Swallow	

=== Weightlifting ===
Men

Athlete	Event
Anthony Arthur	85kg
Gurbinder Cheema	105kg
Stewart Cruickshank	69kg
Karl Grant	94kg
Giles Greenwood	+105kg
Dave Guest	94kg
Delroy McQueen	105kg
Stephen Ward	85kg

Women

Athlete	Event
Dyana Altenor	53kg
Juliana Auguste	69kg
Jo Calvino	53kg
Annette Campbell	63kg
Rachael Clark	75kg
Maggie Lynes	+75kg
Sharon Oakley	69kg

=== Wrestling ===
Men only

Athlete	Event
Nate Ackerman	74 kg
Andy Hutchinson	55 kg
John Melling	66 kg
Johannes Rossouw	96 kg
Amarjit Singh	120 kg
Jatinder Singh Chatha	84 kg
Paul Stridgeon	60 kg
