= Katy Lennon =

British artistic gymnast (born 1984)

- Born: 16 October 1984 (age 41) Carshalton, England
- Height: 1.53 m (5 ft 0 in)

Gymnastics career
- Discipline: Women's artistic gymnastics
- Country represented: United Kingdom; England
- Gym: Leatherhead and Dorking Gymnastics Club
- Head coach: Margaret Miller
- Retired: 2004
Medal record
Representing England
Commonwealth Games
Silver medal – second place	2002 Manchester	Team

Katy Lennon (born 16 October 1984) is a British former artistic gymnast. She represented Great Britain at the 2004 Summer Olympics and was the team captain of the British team that finished 11th. She won a team silver medal at the 2002 Commonwealth Games.

== Gymnastics career ==
Lennon finished ninth in the all-around at the 2001 British Championships. She competed with Beth Tweddle and Becky Owen at the 2002 European Championships in Patras, Greece, and they finished sixth in the team competition. Lennon did not qualify into any of the individual finals. She then represented England at the 2002 Commonwealth Games alongside Tweddle, Owen, Elizabeth Line, and Nicola Willis. The English team won the silver medal behind Australia. In the apparatus finals, she finished eighth on the vault and fifth on the floor exercise. She won the all-around bronze medal, behind Tweddle and Willis, at the 2002 British Championships.

Lennon won the all-around silver medal, behind Tweddle, at the 2004 British Championships. She then competed at the 2004 European Championships in Amsterdam, Netherlands, alongside Tweddle, Line, Willis, and Vanessa Hobbs, and they finished fifth in the team competition. She did not qualify for any of the individual finals. She was selected as the team captain for the team that represented Great Britain at the 2004 Summer Olympics, and they finished 11th out of the 12 teams competing in the qualifications. Lennon qualified for the all-around final in 28th place with a total score of 36.237. In the individual all-around final, Lennon finished 21st with a score of 35.374 after falling off the balance beam. Lennon retired after the Olympic Games.

== Personal life ==
As of 2014, Lennon works as a coach for her old gymnastics club, Leatherhead and Dorking.
