= Penny Edwards =

Penny Edwards may refer to:

- Penny Edwards (cyclist), Welsh cyclist
- Penny Edwards (actress) (1928–1998), American actress
