= Becky Owen =

British artistic gymnast

- Full name: Rebecca Owen
- Born: 16 August 1986 (age 40) Bridlington, England, United Kingdom

Gymnastics career
- Discipline: Women's artistic gymnastics
- Country represented: (United Kingdom) Great Britain
- Head coaches: Christine Still, Colin Still
- Retired: 2003
Medal record
Representing England
Commonwealth Games
Silver medal – second place	2002 Manchester	Team
Silver medal – second place	2002 Manchester	Floor exercise

Rebecca "Becky" Owen (born 16 August 1986) is a British former artistic gymnast. She represented England at the 2002 Commonwealth Games where she won a silver medal in the team event and on the floor exercise.

== Gymnastics career ==
She competed at the 2002 European Championships alongside Beth Tweddle and Katy Lennon, and they finished sixth in the team competition. Individually, Owen finished tenth in the all-around final with a total score of 35.198. At that time, this tenth-place finish tied her for the best finish in a European all-around final.

Owen competed at the 2002 Commonwealth Games with Beth Tweddle, Katy Lennon, Lizzy Line, and Nicola Willis. She was the youngest member of the team. The English team won the silver medal behind Australia. Individually, Owen finished seventh in the all-around final with a total score of 34.900. She finished sixth in both the uneven bars final and the balance beam final. In the floor exercise final, Owen scored a 9.237 and won the silver medal behind Sarah Lauren from Australia.

In 2003, Owen pulled out of the qualifying competitions leading up to the 2004 Olympic Games due to injuries, and she then retired from gymnastics.

== Injuries and lawsuit ==
Owen suffered from her first back fracture when she was eleven years old while performing a whip salto. Owen sued her coaches, Christine and Colin Still, in 2010, claiming that she was forced to continue training through her various back injuries, and that these injuries have left her unable to sit or stand for more than a few minutes, and she is unable to carry a baby.
