= Elizabeth Line (disambiguation) =

The Elizabeth line is a railway line in Greater London.

Elizabeth Line may also refer to:

- Elizabeth Line (gymnast) (born 1985), British gymnast
- Elizabeth Line, a humorous appellation for the queue for the lying-in-state of Elizabeth II
- Elizabeth line, a proposed renaming of the Cross River Rail, Brisbane

== See also ==
- Elizabeth (disambiguation)
