= Lee Vertongen =

New Zealand cyclist

Personal information
- Born: 22 January 1975 (age 51)
Medal record
Men's Track cycling
Commonwealth Games
Bronze medal – third place	1994 Victoria	Team pursuit
Bronze medal – third place	1998 Kuala Lumpur	Team pursuit
Bronze medal – third place	2002 Manchester	Team pursuit

Lee Vertongen (born 22 January 1975 in Palmerston North, New Zealand) is a New Zealand racing cyclist. He has won three bronze medals in the team pursuit event at the Commonwealth Games. He won his third bronze medal riding with Greg Henderson, Hayden Roulston and Matthew Randall at the 2002 Commonwealth Games. He was educated at Russell Street School. He also competed in the men's team pursuit at the 2000 Summer Olympics.
