= Hayley Jones (sport shooter) =

British sports shooter

Personal information
- Full name: Hayley Jones

Sport
- Sport: Shooting sport
- Event: 10 m air rifle
- Club: Lichfield Target Shooting Club
Medal record
Women's shooting
Representing England
CSF(ED)
Gold medal – first place	1992 CSF(ED)	10m Air Rifle

Hayley Jones is a retired English sport shooter. Jones represented England and Great Britain in the 10metre air rifle event, winning the Women's Air Rifle at the 1992 CSF(ED) Championships, captaining England abroad at the InterShoot competition, and setting multiple British records during her career.

== Shooting career ==
In February 1992, Jones became the youngest ever British Women's Air Rifle Champion.

In September 1992, she won Gold for England at the Commonwealth Shooting Federation (European Division) Championships in Northern Ireland.

Jones captained the England Ladies team to InterShoot in 1992, 1993 and 1994. In 1993 the team of Jones, Tessa Lunn and Debbie Lawrence won silver, setting a new English and British Ladies record score of 1149/1200. Jones' individual score of 388/400 qualified her for GB selection to the European Shooting Championships in Brno that August.

In 1994 she qualified as the sole GB female shooter for the European 10Metre Championships in Strasbourg.

At InterShoot in 1998 Jones won team gold and set another British record in the Women's Team Air Rifle, scoring 1161/1200 with Louise Minett and Debbie Venables.
