= David Kikuchi =

Canadian artistic gymnast (born 1979)

- Full name: David Taro Kikuchi
- Born: 27 December 1979 (age 46) Truro, Nova Scotia, Canada
- Height: 162 cm (5 ft 4 in)
- Spouse: Crystal Gilmore

Gymnastics career
- Discipline: Men's artistic gymnastics
- Country represented: Canada (1999–2008)
Medal record
Men's artistic gymnastics
Representing Canada
Commonwealth Games
Gold medal – first place	2006 Melbourne	Team
Silver medal – second place	2002 Manchester	Team
Silver medal – second place	2002 Manchester	Parallel bars
Bronze medal – third place	2002 Manchester	Horizontal bar

David Taro Kikuchi (born 27 December 1979) is a Canadian artistic gymnastics coach and former gymnast. He won a gold medal in the team event at the 2006 Commonwealth Games and participated at the 2004 and 2008 Summer Olympics. He also won three medals at the 2002 Commonwealth Games.

== Gymnastics career ==
Kikuchi began gymnastics at a young age because both of his parents were coaches. He joined the Canadian national team in 1999.

Kikuchi represented Canada at the 2002 Commonwealth Games with the team that won the silver medal behind England. Individually, he won a silver medal on the parallel bars, behind Philippe Rizzo, and a bronze medal on the horizontal bar, behind Rizzo and Damian Istria. At the 2003 World Championships, he helped Canada qualify a full team for the 2004 Summer Olympics with a ninth-place finish. Individually, he advanced into the all-around final and placed 20th.

Kikuchi was selected to represent Canada at the 2004 Summer Olympics, and the team finished 11th in the qualifications. He won his first national all-around title in 2006. He then competed at the 2006 Commonwealth Games and helped Canada win the team competition, and he placed fourth in the pommel horse final. At the 2006 World Championships, he competed on three apparatuses in the team final to help Canada finish sixth. He successfully defended his national all-around title in 2007. He then advanced into the all-around final at the 2007 World Championships and finished 20th.

Kikuchi represented Canada at the 2008 Summer Olympics, where the team placed ninth in the qualifications. They were less than four-tenths of a point away from advancing into the team final. He retired from gymnastics after these Olympics.

== Awards and honors ==
Kikuchi was inducted into the Nova Scotia Sport Hall of Fame in 2015.

== Personal life ==
Kikuchi began coaching gymnastics after his retirement from the sport. He coaches at Alta Gymnastics Club in Halifax and is best known for coaching three-time Olympian Ellie Black.

Kikuchi was formerly married to fellow Canadian Olympic gymnast Crystal Gilmore. They have two children and coach together at the Alta Gymnastics Club.
