= Matthew Randall =

New Zealand cyclist (born 1978)

Personal information
- Born: 24 April 1978 (age 48) Invercargill
Medal record
Men's Track cycling
Commonwealth Games
Bronze medal – third place	2002 Manchester	Team pursuit

Matthew Randall (born 24 April 1978) is a New Zealand racing cyclist. He won a bronze medal at the 2002 Commonwealth Games in the 4000m team pursuit riding with Greg Henderson, Hayden Roulston and Lee Vertongen.
