= Vanessa Meloche =

Canadian artistic gymnast

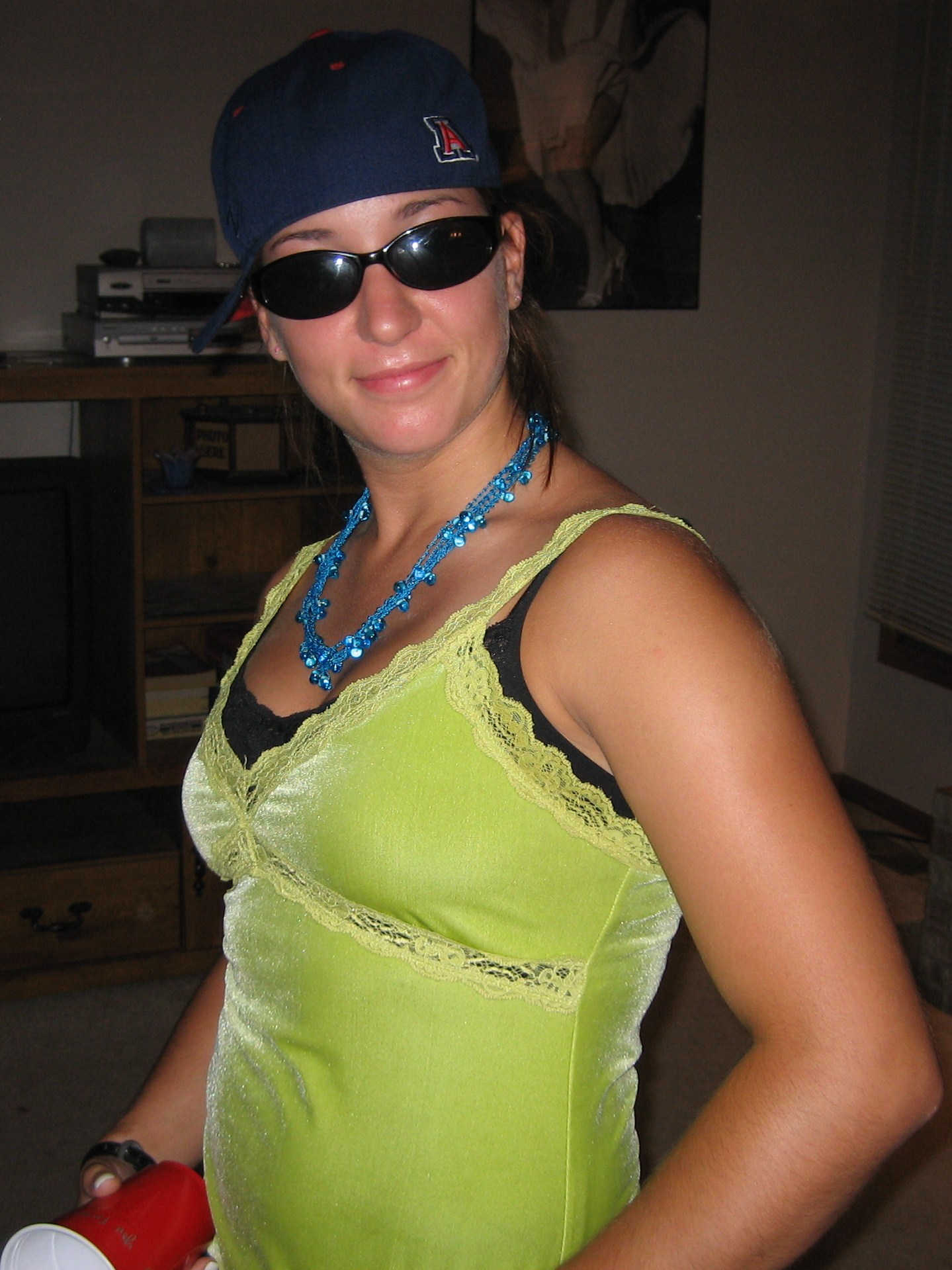
- Meloche in 2006

Personal information
- Born: July 16, 1985 (age 41) Longueuil, Quebec

Gymnastics career
- Discipline: Women's artistic gymnastics
- Country represented: Canada
Medal record
Women's artistic gymnastics
Representing Canada
Commonwealth Games
Bronze medal – third place	2002 Manchester	Team
Bronze medal – third place	2002 Manchester	Vault
Bronze medal – third place	2002 Manchester	Uneven Bars

Vanessa Meloche (born July 16, 1985) is a Canadian gymnast and 2002 Canadian National Uneven Bars Champion.

During most of her competitive career, Vanessa trained at Parkettes in Allentown, Pennsylvania.

She competed for the University of Nebraska–Lincoln between 2005 and 2008, where she was a three-time member of the Big 12 Commissioner's Honor Roll.
