= Louise Minett =

British sport shooter

Personal information
- Nationality: British
- Born: Minett; 1975 (age 50–51) Bicester, England
- Height: 1.65 m (5 ft 5 in)
- Website: lcm400.co.uk

Sport
- Country: United Kingdom
- Sport: Shooting sport
- Events: 10 metre air rifle; 50 metre rifle three positions; 50 metre rifle prone
- Club: Fareham
- Coached by: Dr. Irene Daw; Kimmo Yli Jaskari
Medal record
Women's shooting
Representing Great Britain
Event	1st	2nd	3rd
ISSF World Cup	-	1	-
ISSF World Cup
Silver medal – second place	1999 Atlanta	10 m Air Rifle
Representing England
Event	1st	2nd	3rd
Commonwealth Games	1	1	4
CSF Championships	-	1	1
Commonwealth Games
Gold medal – first place	2006 Melbourne	50 m Rifle 3 Position Pairs
Silver medal – second place	1994 Victoria	10 m Air Rifle Pairs
Bronze medal – third place	1998 Kuala Lumpur	10 m Air Rifle Singles
Bronze medal – third place	1998 Kuala Lumpur	10 m Air Rifle Pairs
Bronze medal – third place	2002 Manchester	10 m Air Rifle Singles
Bronze medal – third place	2002 Manchester	10 m Air Rifle Pairs
Commonwealth Shooting Championships
Silver medal – second place	2001 Bisley	10m Air Rifle Singles
Bronze medal – third place	2001 Bisley	10m Air Rifle Pairs

Louise Minett (born 1975) is a female British sports shooter who won 6 medals whilst representing England at the Commonwealth Games and represented Great Britain at multiple ISSF World Cups, World Shooting Championships and ESC European Shooting Championships.

== Career ==
Representing England at the 1994 Commonwealth Games, she competed in the 10 metres air rifle pairs event, winning the silver medal with Karen Morton. This was the first of six Commonwealth Games medals that she would win between 1994 and 2006. In Kuala Lumpur 1998 she took the bronze medals in both the 10 metres air rifle singles and the pairs (paired with Becky Spicer). She repeated the same feat (paired with Victoria Eaton) at Manchester 2002. In 2006, Louise finally collected Gold this time in the 50metre 3 Position Rifle Pairs with Becky Spicer.

During her career, Minett represented Great Britain at four World Shooting Championships with a best finish of 18th. She also represented at 21 ISSF World Cups with four top-10 finishes in addition to a silver AR40 medal at the 1999 Atlanta World Cup. That medal qualified her for the 1999 World Cup Final in Munich where she finished 9th, missing out on a place in the 8-athlete final. She also represented Great Britain at the European Shooting Championships every year between 1994 and 2005, and also in 2007, with multiple finals places.

At the 1998 InterShoot match in the Netherlands, Minett set a British Finals Record of 502.0 in the Women's 10metre air event. This exceeded the World Record at the time, but was not eligible as Intershoot is not an ISSF-sanctioned event. At the same event, Minett also won team gold and set a British team record scoring 1161/1200 with Hayley Jones and Debbie Venables.

Domestically, Minett won the British Women's Air Rifle Championship ten times, setting numerous individual and team British records in the process, several of which remained unbroken by 2013 when decimal scoring was adopted for 10m Air Rifle, creating a new generation of records.

Following her retirement from world class shooting, Minett was certified as an ISSF Rifle Coach.
