= Chrissy Redden =

Canadian cyclist

Personal information
- Born: 16 March 1966 (age 60) Hamilton, Ontario, Canada

Cycling career
- Sport: Cycling
- Discipline: Cross-country
Medal record
World Championships
Gold medal – first place	2001 Vail	Cross-country team
Bronze medal – third place	2003 Lugano	Cross-country team
Commonwealth Games
Gold medal – first place	2002 Manchester	Cross-country

Chrissy Redden (born 16 March 1966) is a Canadian cross-country cyclist.

Redden participated in the women's cross-country event at the 2000 Summer Olympics in Sydney where she finished in 8th place.

She won a gold medal at the 2002 Commonwealth Games in the women's cross-country event.

She was also named the Canadian female cyclist of the year in 1999 and the Pacific Sport female cyclist of the year in 2001.
