= Kyle Shewfelt =

Canadian artistic gymnast (born 1982)

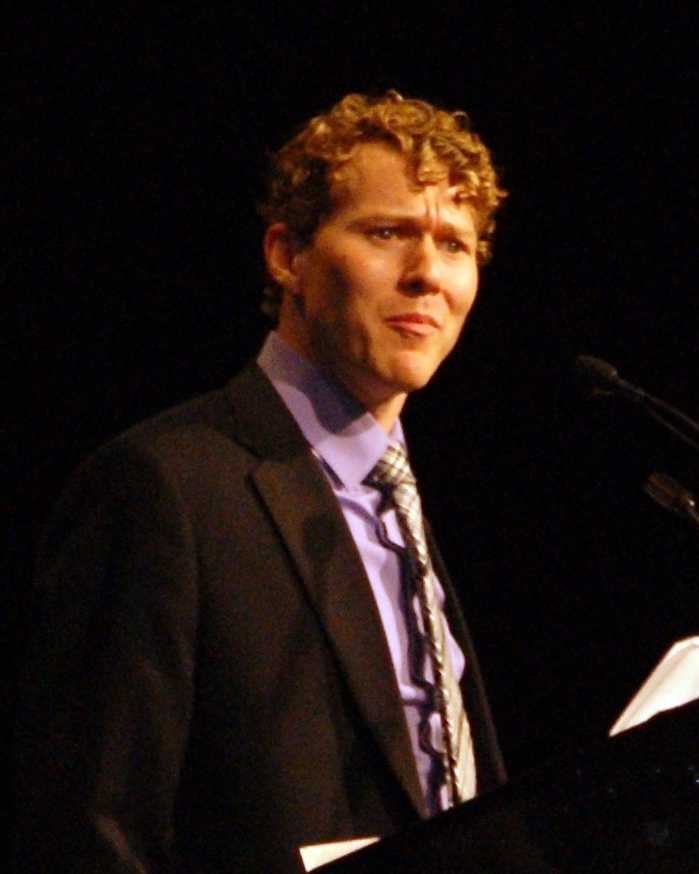
- Shewfelt at Canada's Sports Hall of Fame Induction Dinner, November 10, 2010, Calgary, Alberta

Personal information
- Full name: Kyle Keith Shewfelt
- Born: May 6, 1982 (age 44) Calgary, Alberta, Canada
- Height: 5 ft 5 in (165 cm)

Gymnastics career
- Discipline: Men's artistic gymnastics
- Country represented: Canada
- Club: Altadore Gymnastics Club
- Retired: May 21, 2009
Medal record
Men's gymnastics
Representing Canada
Olympic Games
Gold medal – first place	2004 Athens	Floor
World Championship
Bronze medal – third place	2003 Anaheim	Floor
Bronze medal – third place	2003 Anaheim	Vault
Bronze medal – third place	2006 Aarhus	Floor
Commonwealth Games
Gold medal – first place	2002 Manchester	Floor
Gold medal – first place	2002 Manchester	Vault
Gold medal – first place	2006 Melbourne	Team
Gold medal – first place	2006 Melbourne	Vault
Silver medal – second place	2002 Manchester	Team
Bronze medal – third place	2006 Melbourne	Floor

Kyle Keith Shewfelt (born May 6, 1982 in Calgary, Alberta) is a Canadian gymnast. His gold medal in the men's floor exercise competition at the 2004 Athens Olympics was the first-ever medal for a Canadian in an artistic gymnastics event and was the first Canadian gold of the 2004 Olympics. He also has a vault named after him.

Shewfelt was considered a medal threat in advance of the Athens Games. In the end, Shewfelt finished first on floor and fourth on vault.

== Early life and education ==
Born in Calgary, he first began practicing gymnastics in 1988, influenced by a neighbour. His father was also an athlete playing for the Brandon Wheat Kings hockey team. While Shewfelt was a skilled hockey player, he turned to gymnastics at an early age. He attended Calgary's National Sport School in order to complete his high school education, while pursuing his Olympic plans with fellow athletes at the school Kyle trained at Altadore Gymnastic Club under coach Kelly Manjak, from age six up until the 2004 Olympics.

== Gymnastics career ==
In 2000, Kyle was unexpectedly, due to his young age, selected for the Sydney Olympics. He competed in the individual floor and vault event qualifications in ranks of 12 and 26, respectively, and did not qualify to the finals in either.

He caught the attention of judges performing a new vault, a Yurchenko with two and one-half twists. The new move was ratified by the judges and subsequently named the Shewfelt vault.

Shewfelt's long-held goal of Olympic gold was endangered when he severely bruised the talus bone in his ankle in March 2004, but he made a full recovery in time for Athens. Before the Olympics, Shewfelt speculated on moving to Cirque du Soleil after his athletic career was over.

At the 2004 Summer Olympics in Athens, there was some controversy when Shewfelt was marginally edged out by Marian Drăgulescu of Romania with an average combined score of 9.612 to the bronze medal in the individual vault final by 0.013 points despite Drăgulescu falling in his second vault and Shewfelt completing two comparatively well-executed vaults with an average combined score of 9.599. In 2004 following the Olympics, Shewfelt's coach Kelly Manjak was married in and moved to Ontario. Shewfelt stayed in Calgary, training with coach Tony Smith at the University of Calgary. The following year, Shewfelt played Manjak in the Hungarian-made film White Palms.

In 2006, Shewfelt made a comeback to the international scene, leading the Canadian team to a gold medal at the Commonwealth Games in Australia, collecting bronze on Floor and gold on Vault for himself. That same year, Shewfelt helped his team to a second-place finish at the Pacific Alliance competition. In the individual events, Shewfelt placed first on vault and floor. Next was the world championships in Denmark, where Shewfelt led his team to a best-ever team ranking (6th) and where he collected another world championship medal (bronze on floor exercise).

In August 2007, Kyle fractured both of his tibias in a fluke landing training for floor exercise just prior to the world championships in Germany. Withdrawing from the event, Kyle hoped to heal and get back into training in sufficient time to make a bid for the 2008 Summer Olympic team.

After 11 months of intense rehab and recovery, Kyle was named to his third Canadian Olympic team. He was selected to represent Canada in Beijing after proving that he was in top form at a test competition capping a week-long training camp in Calgary.

At the 2008 Beijing Olympics, Shewfelt competed in the preliminary artistic gymnastics round. Shewfelt was unable to reach the top eight in either of his specialties (the cut-off for admission to the Olympic finals), finishing ninth in vault and 11th in floor. Shewfelt received the highest execution score (B score) for the two vaults he performed (9.75). After his exit from the Olympics, Kyle became a guest commentator on artistic gymnastics for CBC Television's Olympic coverage.

On May 21, 2009, Shewfelt announced on his blog that he was retiring from competition.

"After much thought and consideration, I have come to the decision that it's time to hang up the grips, put away the stinky gym shoes, remove the singlet, take my hands out of the chalk bucket and start embarking on new journeys," Shewfelt wrote. He would take on an ambassador role with Gymnastics Canada to promote this sport.

== Post-gymnastics career ==
During the 2012 London Olympics, he served as a gymnastics analyst for the CTV Television Network-led Canadian Olympic Broadcast Media Consortium.

In 2018, he was working as a gymnastics coach.

In 2021, he published an autobiography, Make it Happen.

== Routine skills ==
- Vault: 2½-Twisting Yurchenko (The Shewfelt); Double-Twisting Tsukahara
- Floor: (2004) 1½ Whip, Full Twist, Rudi; 2½ Twist, Front Layout, 1¾ Front; Full Twisting Back handspring; Layout Arabian with Full Twist; Double Twisting Double Back (2008) Arabian Double Piked Front; 1½ Twist to a Full Twist, Front Layout with 1¾ Front Dive; 2½ Twist to a 1.5 Twist, Layout Arabian with Full Twist, Double Twisting Double Back
- Horizontal Bar: Deff, Tkatchev, piked stalder, Full pirouette, Double Twisting Double Layout

== Competitive history ==
=== 2000 season ===
Year	Competition	Location	Event	Final-Rank	Final-Score	Qualifying Rank	Qualifying Score
2000	2000 Summer Olympics	Sydney	Floor Exercise	DNQ	N/A	12	9.575
2000	2000 Summer Olympics	Sydney	Vault	DNQ	N/A	26	9.575

=== 2004 season ===
Year	Competition	Location	Event	Final-Rank	Final-Score	Qualifying Rank	Qualifying Score
2004	2004 Summer Olympics	Athens	Team	DNQ	N/A	11	221.905
2004	2004 Summer Olympics	Athens	Floor Exercise	1	9.787	3	9.737
2004	2004 Summer Olympics	Athens	Still Rings	DNQ	N/A	76	8.112
2004	2004 Summer Olympics	Athens	Vault	4	9.599	5	9.687
2004	2004 Summer Olympics	Athens	Horizontal Bar	DNQ	N/A	57	9.212
2004	Olympic Trials	Calgary	Floor Exercise	2	9.600	2	9.500
2004	Olympic Trials	Calgary	Pommel Horse	8	7.800	7	8.450
2004	Olympic Trials	Calgary	Vault	1	9.700	1	9.800
2004	Olympic Trials	Calgary	Horizontal Bar	2	9.200	2	9.500

=== 2006 season ===
Year	Competition	Location	Event	Final-Rank	Final-Score	Qualifying Rank	Qualifying Score
2006	World Championships	Aarhus	Team	6	270.350	5	361.975
2006	World Championships	Aarhus	Floor Exercise	3	15.700		15.475
2006	World Championships	Aarhus	Still Rings	DNQ	N/A		13.950
2006	World Championships	Aarhus	Vault	DNQ	N/A		15.750
2006	World Championships	Aarhus	Horizontal Bar	DNQ	N/A		14.800
2006	Pacific Alliance Championships	Honolulu	Team	2	268.600		
2006	Pacific Alliance Championships	Honolulu	Floor Exercise	1	15.600		
2006	Pacific Alliance Championships	Honolulu	Vault	1	16.375		
2006	Pacific Alliance Championships	Honolulu	Horizontal Bar	5	15.050		
2006	Commonwealth Games	Melbourne	Team	1	269.750	1	269.750
2006	Commonwealth Games	Melbourne	Floor Exercise	3	14.700	1	15.500
2006	Commonwealth Games	Melbourne	Vault	1	16.337	1	16.600
2006	Commonwealth Games	Melbourne	Horizontal Bar	7	14.525	2	14.700

=== 2008 season ===
Year	Competition	Location	Event	Final-Rank	Final-Score	Qualifying Rank	Qualifying Score
2008	2008 Summer Olympics	Beijing	Team	DNQ	N/A	9	358.975
2008	2008 Summer Olympics	Beijing	Floor Exercise	DNQ	N/A	11	15.525
2008	2008 Summer Olympics	Beijing	Still Rings	DNQ	N/A	62	13.925
2008	2008 Summer Olympics	Beijing	Vault	DNQ	N/A	9	16.350
2008	2008 Summer Olympics	Beijing	Horizontal Bar	DNQ	N/A	52	14.250
2008	Olympic Trials #3/4	Calgary	Floor Exercise	1	15.500	2	15.600
2008	Olympic Trials #3/4	Calgary	Still Rings	5	13.900	6	13.700
2008	Olympic Trials #3/4	Calgary	Vault	1	16.400	1	16.300
2008	Olympic Trials #3/4	Calgary	Horizontal Bar	4	15.400	3	14.600
2008	Olympic Trials #1/2	Edmonton	Floor Exercise	2	15.600	2	15.500
2008	Olympic Trials #1/2	Edmonton	Still Rings	6	13.900	6	13.700
2008	Olympic Trials #1/2	Edmonton	Vault	1	16.400	1	16.500
2008	Olympic Trials #1/2	Edmonton	Horizontal Bar	2	14.700	3	14.600
