= Kylie Stone =

Canadian artistic gymnast (born 1987)

- Born: 16 May 1987 (age 39)

Gymnastics career
- Discipline: Women's artistic gymnastics
- Country represented: Canada (2003)
Medal record
Women's artistic gymnastics
Representing Canada
Commonwealth Games
Bronze medal – third place	2002 Manchester	Team
Bronze medal – third place	2002 Manchester	Floor

Kylie Anne Stone (born 16 May 1987) is a Canadian artistic gymnast, representing her nation at international competitions.

She participated at the 2004 Summer Olympics. She competed also at world championships, including the 2003 World Artistic Gymnastics Championships in Anaheim.
