= Seamus McGrath =

Canadian cyclist

Personal information
- Full name: Seamus Patrick McGrath
- Born: March 5, 1976 (age 50) Mississauga, Ontario, Canada
- Height: 1.76 m (5 ft 9 1/2 in)
- Weight: 62 kg (137 lb)

Cycling career
- Sport: Cycling
- Current team: Retired
- Discipline: Mountain biking
- Role: Rider
- Rider type: Cross-country

Professional teams
- 1998: Haro MTB Team
- 2000–2002: Haro-Lee Dungaree
- 2007–2008: Rocky Mountain-Haywood
Medal record
Men's mountain biking
Representing Canada
Commonwealth Games
Silver medal – second place	2002 Manchester	Cross-country
Bronze medal – third place	2006 Melbourne	Cross-country

Seamus Patrick McGrath (born March 5, 1976, in Mississauga, Ontario) is a retired Canadian professional mountain biker. Riding the sport for more than 15 years as a member of the Canadian national team, McGrath has won two medals in mountain biking at the Commonwealth Games (2002 and 2006), and later represented his nation Canada in two editions of the Olympic Games (2004 and 2008). Before retiring to focus on and organize the annual Tour de Victoria race in late 2008, McGrath also trained and raced professionally for Haro-Lee Dungaree and Fuji Bikes under an exclusive sponsorship contract.

Growing up in Flamborough, Ontario, McGrath made his official debut at the 2002 Commonwealth Games in Manchester, England, where he joined his teammate Roland Green to take the silver medal and climb on top of the podium for Canada with a spectacular 1–2 finish.

When he first competed for Canada at the 2004 Summer Olympics in Athens, McGrath scored a career-high, ninth place in the men's cross-country race with a time of 2:20:33, finishing just off the podium by a three-minute gap. Two years later, McGrath continued to set another sterling record by picking up the bronze in the same tournament (2:13:43) at the 2006 Commonwealth Games in Melbourne, Australia, trailing behind the British duo Liam Killeen and Oliver Beckingsale within a short riding distance.

At the 2008 Summer Olympics in Beijing, McGrath qualified for his second Canadian squad, as a 32-year-old senior, in the men's cross-country race by receiving one of the nation's three available berths from the Canadian Cycling Association and the Union Cycliste Internationale, based on his best performance at the World Cup series, World Championships, and Mountain Biking World Series. McGrath could not match a stellar performance from Athens, as he suffered a tyre puncture and then had to ride the rim all the way around the tech zone in order to replace the flat tyre. Realizing that his new wheel contained a slow leak at the designated site, McGrath decided to end his course with only three laps left and a forty-fourth-place finish.

In 2013 disgraced cyclist Michael Rasmussen wrote a book titled Yellow Fever in which he claimed that Seamus McGrath along with two other Canadian mountain-bikers (Ryder Hesjedal and Chris Sheppard) travelled to Spain in 2003 so that Michael Rasmussen could show them how to use doping products properly. In his book, Rasmussen writes that Seamus McGrath, Ryder Hesjedal and Chris Sheppard all received advice on doping from him; "A good result in the world championships [2003] could send them to the Olympics in Athens in 2004," Rasmussen wrote. "They moved into my basement in August, before I went to the Vuelta a Espana, and right after I had ridden the Meisterschaft von Zurich. There, they stayed around 14 days' time. I trained with them in the Dolomites and taught them how to [make] vitamin injections and how you took EPO and Synacthen [cortisone]." Seamus confessed to using these doping products only for the period of time in which Michael Rasmussen claimed to have shown the three cyclists how to use the doping products. In a statement in 2013 Seamus said, “When I became aware of doping in my early 20s, I made a promise to myself to commit to clean sport,” McGrath said in a statement. “I broke this promise to myself in 2003. I’d like to take this chance to apologize first and foremost to my parents who instilled in me strong morals and values, which I compromised for a brief period over a decade ago. I would also like to apologize to my family, friends, fans and sponsors who supported me during my career,” McGrath said, “along with my fellow competitors at the time. I disrespected the sport I love and am ashamed of my actions. I broke the rules of sportsmanship and went against what I knew to be right. For this, I will always be sorry."
