= Kate Richardson (gymnast) =

Canadian artistic gymnast

- Born: June 27, 1984 (age 42) Vancouver, British Columbia

Gymnastics career
- Discipline: Women's artistic gymnastics
- Country represented: Canada (1996–2004)
- Retired: 2004
Medal record
Women's artistic gymnastics
Representing Canada
Commonwealth Games
Gold medal – first place	2002 Manchester	All-Around
Gold medal – first place	2002 Manchester	Balance Beam
Bronze medal – third place	2002 Manchester	Team

Kate Richardson (born June 27, 1984) is a Canadian former artistic gymnast. She represented Canada at the 2000 and 2004 Summer Olympics. She competed for the UCLA Bruins from 2002–2006.

== Elite gymnastics career ==
Richardson began gymnastics at the age of three and was a member of Canada's national team from 1996 to 2004. She was the national novice champion in 1996, junior national champion in 1998, and senior national champion in 2001.

She won a team gold medal at the 1999 Pan American Games in Winnipeg. At the 1999 World Artistic Gymnastics Championships in Tianjin, Richardson finished 19th in the all-around. The following year, she competed at the 2000 Summer Olympics in Sydney, where she placed 15th in the all-around. She placed 16th at the 2001 World Championships in Ghent, Belgium.

At the 2002 Commonwealth Games in Manchester, Richardson won gold medals in the all-around and on balance beam, as well as a bronze medal with the Canadian team. At the 2004 Summer Olympics in Athens, she finished 18th in the all-around and 7th in the floor exercise final. She was the first Canadian woman ever to qualify for an Olympic event final in women's gymnastics, and the first woman of any nationality since Kelly Garrison-Steves in 1988 to make the Olympics while competing in the NCAA. (Her Bruin teammate Mohini Bhardwaj also competed in the 2004 Olympics, but after her NCAA career was over.)

== NCAA career ==
Richardson enrolled at the University of California, Los Angeles, in 2002 on an athletic scholarship and competed with the UCLA Bruins gymnastics team, which won the NCAA Championships in 2003 and 2004. Her teammates included Kristen Maloney, Tasha Schwikert, and Jamie Dantzscher, all of whom competed for the United States at the 2000 Olympics. During her college career, Richardson won individual NCAA titles on balance beam (2003), uneven bars (2003), and floor exercise (2006). In 2006, she was named Pac-10 Female Student-Athlete of the Year.

Richardson graduated from UCLA in 2007 with a degree in psychobiology. In 2010, she earned a master's degree in physical therapy from the University of British Columbia.

Richardson was inducted into the UCLA Athletics Hall of Fame as a member of the 2022 class.
