= Nina Davies (cyclist) =

Welsh cyclist

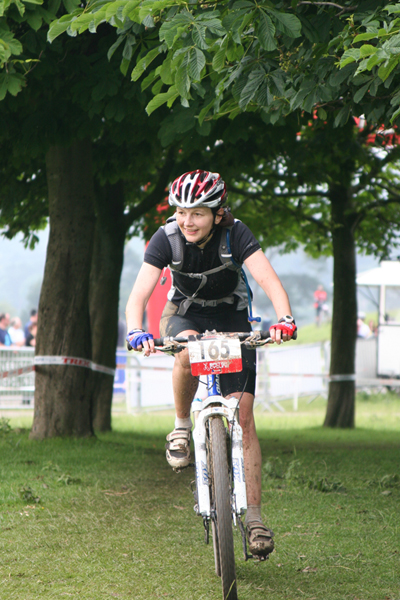
- British National MTB Marathon Champs. Margam Park, 1 June 2008

Personal information
- Full name: Nina Davies
- Nickname: None known
- Born: 14 September 1974 (age 52) Oslo, Norway

Cycling career
- Sport: Cycling
- Disciplines: Road, cyclo-cross and XC
- Role: Rider

Professional teams
- 2002: Port Talbot Wheelers
- 2003: Letchworth – Extran – Moser
- 2005-: Ogmore Valley Wheelers

Nina Davies (born 14 September 1974) is a Welsh racing cyclist from the Vale of Glamorgan, Wales. She represented Wales at the 2002 Commonwealth Games in Manchester, England. She competed earlier as a road racing cyclist both for Wales and for GB, but since 2008 she mostly participates in mountain bike championships.

== Palmarès ==
2001
1st Welsh Road Race Championships
2002
9th British National Road Race Championships
15th Commonwealth Games TT – Manchester
22nd Road race Commonwealth Games – Manchester

2003
7th British National Road Race Championships

Grand Prix de Plouay representing GB

2004
Represented GB in Tour of Geelong (Australia)
Represented GB in Geelong World Cup (Australia)
Represented GB in Primavera Rosa World Cup (Italy)
Represented GB in Tour of Flanders World Cup (Belgium)
Represented GB in Fleche Wallonne World Cup (Belgium)

2005
2nd Mendip Hills Road Race – Round of Women's National RR Series

2007
1st (Wales) Welsh National Cyclo-cross Championships
2nd Welsh Cyclo-cross series – Risca
1st Welsh Cyclo-cross series – Brecon
1st Welsh Cyclo-cross series – Crickhowell
1st Welsh Cyclo-cross series – Newbridge
1st Welsh Cyclo-cross series – Bryn Bach
9th National Trophy – Mallory Park
1st Welsh Cyclo-cross series – Margam
1st Welsh Cyclo-cross series – Blackweir Park, Cardiff

2008
1st (United Kingdom) XC, British National Mountain Bike Championships – Masters
11th British National Cyclo-cross Championships
7th National Trophy Cyclo-cross Derby
1st Dragon MTB Masters, Coed y Brenin – Welsh MTB Series
1st Dragon MTB Masters, Abergwesyn – Welsh MTB Series
4th NPS Masters MTB, Thetford
2nd NPS Masters MTB, Drumlanrig
1st Dragon MTB Masters, Margam – Welsh MTB Series
2nd UK Enduro 50K, Margam
1st NPS Masters, Grizdale
2nd NPS Masters, Eastway
2nd World Championships MTB Masters Pra Loup France

2009
1st Dragon MTB Masters, Llangedla
2nd NPS Masters, Sherwood
2nd Dragon MTB Masters, Rhondda
3rs NPS MTB Masters, Dalby
1st NPS MTB Masters, Margam
