= Andy Slater (cyclist) =

English cyclist

Personal information
- Full name: Andrew Lawrence Slater
- Nickname: Slaternator
- Born: 26 August 1974 (age 52) Yeovil Somerset
- Height: 6 ft 2 in (188 cm)

Cycling career
- Sport: Cycling
- Current team: VC St Raphael
- Discipline: Track
- Role: Rider
- Rider type: Sprinter

Major wins
- 3 times British Champion Commonwealth Games European Championship World Cup Winner Team Sprint (Sydney) World Cup Bronze Team Sprint (Columbia)
Medal record
Men's track cycling
Representing England
Commonwealth Games
Silver medal – second place	2002 Manchester	team sprint
Men's track cycling
Representing United Kingdom
World Cup
Gold medal – first place	2002 Sydney	team sprint
Men's track cycling

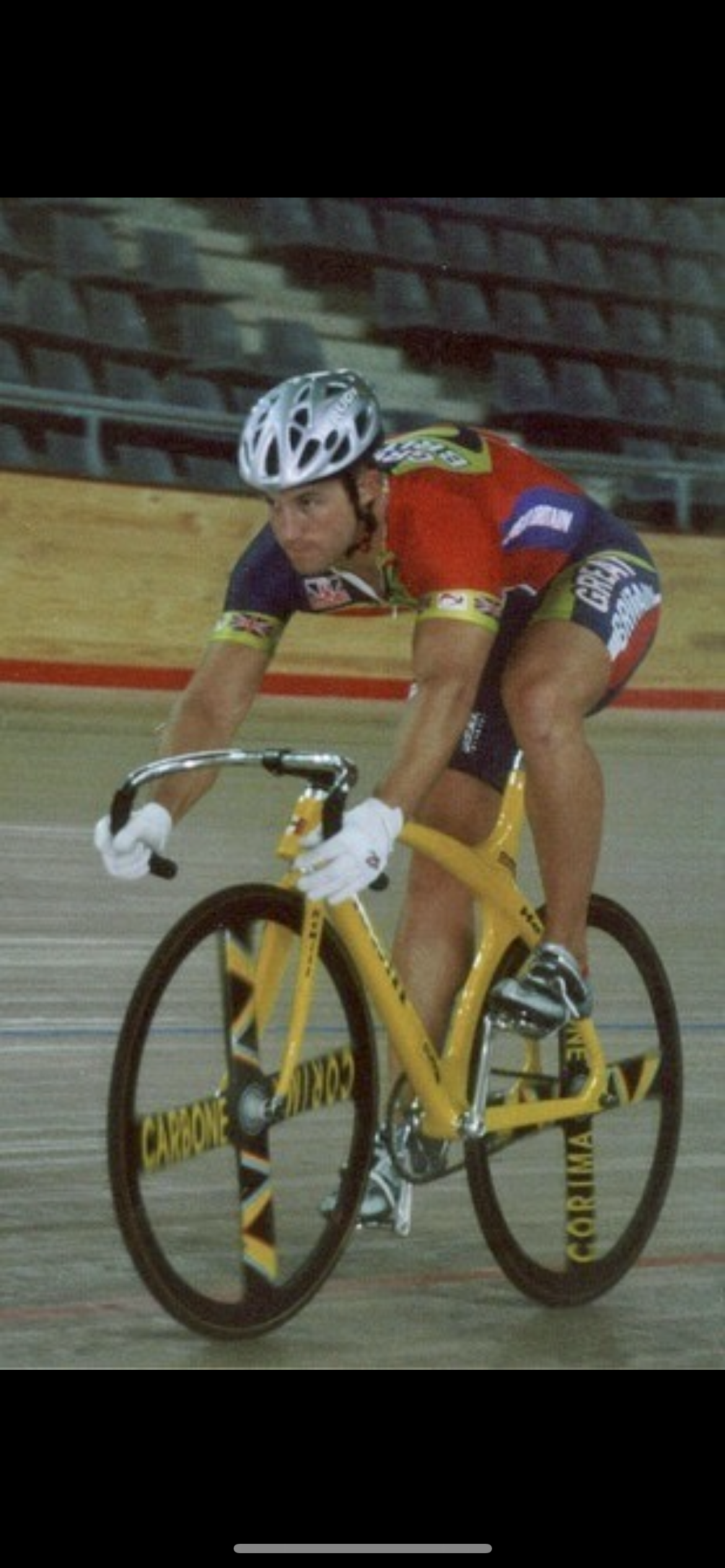

National Titles

Sprint Champion 2002 British

Andy Slater (born 1974) is an English male former track cyclist.

== Cycling career ==
Slater was a British track champion after winning the British National Individual Sprint Championships in 2002. He won a silver medal as part of the England team sprint with Jamie Staff and Jason Queally at the 2002 Commonwealth Games. World Cup Winner Team Sprint 2002 Dunc Gray Velodrome Sydney Australia

== Family ==
Married with 3 children.

Kian Slater

Madelaine Slater

Katy Slater
