= Damian Istria =

Australian artistic gymnast

Damian Mark Istria
- Born: 24 August 1982 (age 44) Brisbane, Australia

Gymnastics career
- Discipline: Men's artistic gymnastics
- Country represented: Australia
- Club: Lawnton Academy of Artistic Gymnastics
Medal record
Commonwealth Games
Gold medal – first place	2006 Melbourne	Horizontal bar
Silver medal – second place	2002 Manchester	Horizontal bar
Silver medal – second place	2006 Melbourne	Team
Silver medal – second place	2006 Melbourne	Rings

Damian Mark Istria (born 24 August 1982) is an Australian artistic gymnast who competed at the 2000 Sydney Olympic Games, and the 2002 and 2006 Commonwealth Games.

He was commemorated on Australian postage stamps following his gold medal at the 2006 Commonwealth Games.

After his competitive gymnastics career he became an acrobat at Cirque du Soleil.
