= Adrian Turner =

British Olympian and Commonwealth Games medallist

Personal information
- Full name: Adrian Roy Turner
- National team: Great Britain
- Born: 21 January 1977 (age 49) Manchester, England
- Height: 1.88 m (6 ft 2 in)
- Weight: 82 kg (181 lb)

Sport
- Sport: Swimming
- Strokes: Breaststroke, medley
- Club: City of Salford SC; Stockport Metro
Medal record
Men's swimming
Representing England
Commonwealth Games
Silver medal – second place	2002 Manchester	200 m medley
Bronze medal – third place	2002 Manchester	400 m medley

Adrian Roy Turner (born 21 January 1977) is a British former Olympic swimmer, known for winning silver and bronze medals representing England at the 2002 Commonwealth Games and reaching the semi-final of the Athens 2004 Games.

== Swimming career ==
Turner represented Great Britain on numerous occasions during his swimming career principally the 2004 Athens Olympic Games where he swam both individual medley events and reached the semi-final stage of the 200m.

Previously Turner had competed at two Commonwealth Games; he represented England in the individual medley events, at the 1998 Commonwealth Games in Kuala Lumpur, Malaysia.

Four years later at the 2002 Commonwealth Games in Manchester, he represented England in the 200m individual medley finishing in silver medal position in a time of 2:02.10 and the 400m individual medley finishing with bronze in 4:18.75.

== Personal life ==
After retiring from international swimming Turner joined up with Olympic teammate Stephen Parry to found Total Swimming Ltd. The vision of the company is "Revolutionizing Swimming, Changing Lives."

Following the 2004 Athens Olympic Games Turner attended the Universita` per Stranieri di Perugia in Italy, where he studied a post-graduate course in the history of Italian theatre from 2004 to 2005. He is fluent in Italian. Following this he attended the Royal Academy of Dramatic Art (RADA) in London, completing a Masters in Text and Performance from 2005 to 2006. In 2010 he joined the cast of BBC drama The Cut in a recurring role as Coach Reynolds. In the same year he was cast in the lead role in Nice Shirt Films' international Vicks Sinex ad-campaign. From 2010 to 2012 he played Championship footballer Danny Deans in Big Balls Films/WeRInteractive's video-game 'I Am Playr' which was nominated for a BAFTA in 2012 and won the Cannes Golden Lion Award the same year.

He is the brother of TV presenter Bev Turner and previously brother-in-law of Olympic rower James Cracknell.

== See also ==
- List of Commonwealth Games medallists in swimming (men)
