= Sara Symington =

English cyclist (born 1969)

Personal information
- Full name: Sara Symington
- Born: 5 September 1969 (age 57) England; United Kingdom
- Height: 1.72 m (5 ft 8 in)
- Weight: 63 kg (139 lb; 9.9 st)

Cycling career
- Sport: Cycling
- Disciplines: Road & Track
- Role: Rider

Professional team
- 2004: S.A.T.S.

Sara Symington (born 25 September 1969) is a female English former professional cyclist.

== Cycling career ==
She was the first British female rider to take a medal in a World Cup race, which she achieved in Australia in 1999. She represented Great Britain at the 2000 and 2004 Summer Olympics and England at the 1998 Commonwealth Games and 2002 Commonwealth Games. She also rode at the 1998, 1999, and 2000 UCI Road World Championships and on the track at the 2001 and 2002 UCI Track Cycling World Championships.

== Personal life ==
Symington was born in Maracaibo, Venezuela, lived in Aylestone and she now lives in Nottingham. She had competed as a javelin thrower as a junior, and she was a member of the national triathlon team prior to becoming a full-time cyclist. Symington started her elite triathlon career whilst combining studying for a master's degree with a spell serving in the police, having previously graduated from Loughborough University with a degree in sports science.

== Post cycling ==
Symington retired from competition after the 2004 Olympics: following this she worked in business for two years, before returning to the sports world through working as a performance advisor for UK Sport. She was subsequently appointed performance director of Archery GB in February 2009. In February 2015 England Netball announced that she would join them as their performance director the following month. In that role she helped the England national netball team to its first Commonwealth gold medal at the 2018 Commonwealth Games. In August 2020 Symington was appointed by UK Athletics as their performance director. She left this role in October 2021 in order to take up an appointment as head of British Cycling's Olympic and Paralympic programmes.

== Palmarès ==
1998
1st British National Circuit Race Championships

2000
2nd British National Time Trial Championships
1st: Tour of Spain
1st Tour of Montreal
10th Olympic Games
6th World Championships

2001
3rd Pursuit, British National Track Championships
7th Liberty Classic, Philadelphia
6th Montreal World Cup
8th Pursuit, UCI Track Cycling World Championships
1st (stage win) Tour de L'aude

2002
8th Pursuit, UCI Track Cycling World Championships

1st: (stage win) Tour de L'aude
