= Penny Edwards (cyclist) =

Welsh racing cyclist

Personal information
- Full name: Penny Edwards
- Born: 28 November 1981 (age 44) Wales

Cycling career
- Sport: Cycling
- Discipline: Road/MTB/Cyclo-cross
- Role: Rider

Amateur team
- 2002: CC Abergavenny

Penny Edwards is a Welsh cyclist. She represented Wales in the MTB and Road Race at the 2002 Commonwealth Games in Manchester. She is also a solicitor who has worked in Cardiff, New Zealand and London. Edwards competed with the Women's GB Cycling Squad in World Cup Races in Spain, Italy, France and Canada, including the Giro d'Italia and Grande Boucle.

2003
1st Welsh National Cyclo-cross Championships
