= Melanie Sears =

British cyclist

Personal information
- Born: 14 April 1977 (age 49) Luton, Bedfordshire, England, United Kingdom

Sport
- Country: United Kingdom
- Sport: Cycling
- Retired: 2002
Medal record
Cycling
Representing United Kingdom
British National Circuit Race Championships
Silver medal – second place	2000	Women's senior
British National Road Race Championships
Bronze medal – third place	2002	Women's senior

Melanie Sears (born 14 April 1977) is a former English elite road cyclist and former triathlete. She competed at the 2002 Commonwealth Games in Manchester.
