= Elizabeth Line (gymnast) =

British gymnast (born 1985)

Personal information
- Born: 7 June 1985 (age 41) Woking, England

Sport
- Sport: Gymnastics

Elizabeth Line (born 7 June 1985) is a British gymnast. She won a silver medal at the 2002 Commonwealth Games. She later competed at the 2004 Summer Olympics.
