= Nicola Willis (gymnast) =

British artistic gymnast (born 1985)

- Born: 13 March 1985 (age 41) Southend-on-Sea
- Height: 4 ft 11.5 in (151.1 cm)

Gymnastics career
- Discipline: Women's artistic gymnastics
- Country represented: Great Britain; England (2002–2004)
- Club: South Essex Gymnastics Club
Medal record
Women's artistic gymnastics
Representing England
Commonwealth Games
Silver medal – second place	2002 Manchester	Team

Nicola Willis (born 13 March 1985 in Southend-on-Sea) is a former British female artistic gymnast. She represented Great Britain at the 2004 Summer Olympics in Athens. She also competed for England at the 2002 Commonwealth Games. At the 2004 European Women's Artistic Gymnastics Championships she finished with the British team 5th in the team event.

After retiring from competitive gymnastics, she joined Cirque Du Soleil and performed with them on Cirque Du Soleil shows Saltimbanco and La Nouba.

After Cirque Du Soleil she joined The House of Dancing Water (Dragone) as a house troupe acrobat/artist.
