= Swimming at the 2002 Commonwealth Games – Men's 50 metre butterfly =

Men's 50 metre butterfly at the 2002 Commonwealth Games
- Venue: Manchester Aquatics Centre
- Dates: 31 July (heats & semifinals); 1 August (final)
- Competitors: 42 from 25 nations
- Winning time: 23.57

Medalists
gold medal	Geoff Huegill	Australia
silver medal	Roland Schoeman	South Africa
bronze medal	Mark Foster	England

The men's 50 metre butterfly event at the 2002 Commonwealth Games as part of the swimming programme took place on 31 July and 1 August at the Manchester Aquatics Centre in Manchester, England.

== Records ==
Prior to this competition, the existing world and games records were as follows.

World record	(Australia) Geoff Huegill	23.44	Fukuoka , Japan	27 July 2001
Games record	Not set			

== Schedule ==
The schedule was as follows:

All times are local time

Date	Time	Round
Wednesday 31 July	10:00	Heats
Wednesday 31 July	19:35	Semifinals
Thursday 1 August	19:56	Final

== Results ==
=== Heats ===
The 16 fastest swimmers in the heats qualified for the semifinals.

Rank	Heat	Lane	Name	Nationality	Time	Notes
1	6	4	Geoff Huegill	Australia	24.10	Q
2	6	5	Adam Pine	Australia	24.48	Q
3	5	4	Roland Schoeman	South Africa	24.50	Q
4	4	5	Brett Hawke	Australia	24.58	Q
5	5	5	Mike Mintenko	Canada	24.64	Q
6	6	3	Cameron Black	Scotland	24.76	Q
7	4	6	Jonathan Winter	New Zealand	24.78	Q
8	5	3	Todd Cooper	Scotland	24.94	Q
9	6	2	Theo Verster	South Africa	24.97	Q
9	6	6	Ryan Pini	Papua New Guinea	24.97	Q
11	4	2	Hendrik Odendaal	South Africa	25.02	Q
11	5	6	Nicholas Sheeran	New Zealand	25.02	Q
13	4	4	Mark Foster	England	25.09	Q
14	6	7	David Bennett	England	25.19	Q
15	5	7	Moss Burmester	New Zealand	25.24	Q
16	4	3	James Hickman	England	25.28	Q
17	6	1	Stavros Michaelides	Cyprus	25.33	
18	4	1	Musa Bakare	Nigeria	25.73	
19	5	1	Chris Vythoulkas	Bahamas	25.80	
20	5	2	Adam Sioui	Canada	25.82	
21	3	5	Alexis Militis	Jersey	25.91	
22	5	8	Carl Probert	Fiji	26.39	
23	4	7	Mark Chay	Singapore	26.50	
23	6	8	Afolabi Adeleke-Adedoyin	Nigeria	26.50	
24	1	3	Conrad Francis	Sri Lanka	26.56	
25	3	4	Christophe Lim Wen Ying	Mauritius	26.60	
26	3	7	Ramon James	Jamaica	26.70	
27	3	7	Demetris Demetriou	Cyprus	26.75	
28	4	8	Jewel Ahmed	Bangladesh	26.78	
29	2	5	Travano McPhee	Bahamas	26.82	
30	2	8	Ian Powell	Guernsey	27.01	
31	2	4	Kristoph Carey	Bahamas	27.03	
32	2	3	Alan Jones	Isle of Man	27.13	
33	3	3	Hamid Nassir	Kenya	27.17	
34	3	6	Nicholas Diaper	Kenya	27.26	
35	3	2	Jean-Paul Adam	Seychelles	27.27	
36	3	1	Rama Vyombo	Kenya	27.36	
37	2	2	Sean Dehere	Barbados	27.47	
38	2	2	Adam Richards	Isle of Man	27.70	
39	2	1	Ben Lowndes	Guernsey	28.19	
40	2	7	Gerusio Matonse	Mozambique	28.76	
41	1	4	Andre Kuenzli	Zambia	29.72	

=== Semifinals ===
The 8 fastest swimmers in the semifinals qualified for the final.

Rank	Heat	Lane	Name	Nationality	Time	Notes
1	2	4	Geoff Huegill	Australia	23.62	Q, GR
2	2	5	Roland Schoeman	South Africa	23.99	Q
3	1	4	Adam Pine	Australia	24.11	Q
4	2	3	Mike Mintenko	Canada	24.15	Q
5	2	6	Jonathan Winter	New Zealand	24.44	Q
6	1	5	Brett Hawke	Australia	24.45	Q
7	2	1	Mark Foster	England	24.55	Q
8	1	3	Cameron Black	Scotland	24.62	Q
9	1	2	Theo Verster	South Africa	24.81	
10	1	1	David Bennett	England	24.85	
11	1	8	James Hickman	England	24.93	
11	2	2	Ryan Pini	Papua New Guinea	24.93	
13	2	7	Nicholas Sheeran	New Zealand	25.02	
14	1	6	Todd Cooper	Scotland	25.03	
15	1	7	Hendrik Odendaal	South Africa	25.08	
16	2	8	Moss Burmester	New Zealand	25.50	

=== Final ===
The final was held on 1 August at 19:56.

Rank	Lane	Name	Nationality	Time	Notes
1st place, gold medalist(s)	4	Geoff Huegill	Australia	23.57	GR
2nd place, silver medalist(s)	5	Roland Schoeman	South Africa	23.66	
3rd place, bronze medalist(s)	1	Mark Foster	England	24.11	
4	6	Mike Mintenko	Canada	24.15	
5	7	Brett Hawke	Australia	24.21	
6	3	Adam Pine	Australia	24.22	
7	2	Jonathan Winter	New Zealand	24.58	
8	8	Cameron Black	Scotland	24.82	
