= Swimming at the 2002 Commonwealth Games – Men's 50 metre freestyle =

Men's 50 metre freestyle at the 2002 Commonwealth Games
- Venue: Manchester Aquatics Centre
- Dates: 1 August
- Competitors: 21 from 26 nations
- Winning time: 22.33

Medalists
gold medal	Roland Schoeman	South Africa
silver medal	Brett Hawke	Australia
bronze medal	Mark Foster	England

The Men's 50 metre freestyle event at the 2002 Commonwealth Games was held on 3 and 4 August at the Manchester Aquatics Centre.

== Records ==
Prior to this competition, the existing world record was as follows;

World record	Alexander Popov (RUS)	21.64	Moscow, Russia	1 June 2000
Commonwealth record				
Games record				

The following records were established during the competition:

Date	Event	Name	Nationality	Time	Record
3 August	Semifinal	Roland Schoeman	South Africa	22.52	GR
3 August	Semifinal	Brett Hawke	Australia	22.29	GR

== Results ==
=== Heats ===
The 16 fastest swimmers in the heats qualified for the semifinals.

Rank	Heat	Lane	Name	Nationality	Time	Notes
1	5	4	Brett Hawke	Australia	22.67	Q
2	7	4	Roland Schoeman	South Africa	22.88	Q
3	6	4	Ashley Callus	Australia	22.93	Q
4	5	5	Ryk Neethling	South Africa	23.10	Q
5	7	3	Nicholas Folker	South Africa	23.26	Q
6	5	6	Craig Hutchison	Canada	23.27	Q
7	7	5	Mark Foster	England	23.33	Q
7	6	5	Matt Kidd	England	23.33	Q
9	6	6	Chris Cozens	England	23.37	Q
10	7	6	Matthew Rose	Canada	23.43	Q
11	7	2	Todd Pearson	Australia	23.59	Q
12	6	2	Brent Hayden	Canada	23.61	Q
12	6	8	Chrysanthos Papachrysanthou	Cyprus	23.61	Q,
14	7	7	Stavros Michaelides	Cyprus	23.66	Q
15	5	2	Steven Evans	Wales	23.80	Q
16	4	5	Jonathan Winter	New Zealand	23.89	Q
17	4	7	Alexis Militis	Jersey	23.91	
18	6	3	Ryan Pini	Papua New Guinea	23.93	
19	5	3	Carl Probert	Fiji	24.04	
20	5	1	Demetris Demetriou	Cyprus	24.08	
21	6	1	Musa Bakare	Nigeria	24.21	
22	5	7	Nicholas Sheeran	New Zealand	24.29	
23	4	3	Terrence Elton Haynes	Barbados	24.37	
24	4	6	Afolabi Adeleke-Adedoyin	Nigeria	24.42	
25	7	1	Christophe Lin Wen Ying	Mauritius	24.43	
25	5	8	Christopher Vythoulkas	Bahamas	24.43	
27	7	8	Cameron Gibson	New Zealand	24.55	
27	4	4	Roy-Allan Burch	Bermuda	24.55	
29	4	8	Mark Chay	Singapore	24.63	
30	2	4	Ramon James	Jamaica	24.67	
31	6	8	Cliff Gittens	Barbados	24.70	
32	4	1	Jamie Peterkin	Saint Lucia	24.79	
33	3	4	Nicholas Peterkin	Saint Lucia	24.87	
34	4	2	Ron Cowen	Bermuda	24.96	
35	2	5	Alan Jones	Isle of Man	25.14	
36	3	5	Kristoph Carey	Bahamas	25.27	
37	3	7	Hamid Nassir	Kenya	25.46	
38	3	2	Graham Alexander Campbell Smith	Bermuda	25.48	
39	3	3	Folahan Oluwole	Nigeria	25.52	
40	3	1	Rama Vyombo	Kenya	25.58	
41	3	6	Nicholas Diaper	Kenya	25.59	
42	3	8	Ben Lowndes	Guernsey	25.82	
43	2	6	Dave Batty	Isle of Man	26.00	
44	2	3	Angel Gonzalez	Gibraltar	26.35	
45	2	7	Craig Massey-Hicks	Malawi	26.50	
46	2	1	Jonathon Le Noury	Guernsey	26.61	
47	2	8	Andre Kuenzli	Zambia	27.24	
48	1	5	David Asser Korpela	Malawi	27.36	
49	2	2	Gerusio Matonse	Mozambique	27.44	
50	1	3	Yona Walesi	Malawi	32.08	
-	1	-	Joel Kisuule	Uganda	DSQ	

=== Semifinals ===
The eight fastest swimmers from the semifinals progressed to the final.

==== Semifinal 1 ====
Rank	Lane	Name	Nation	Result	Notes
1	4	Roland Schoeman	South Africa	22.52	Q, GR
2	5	Ryk Neethling	South Africa	22.62	Q
3	3	Craig Hutchison	Canada	22.96	Q
4	6	Matt Kidd	England	23.06	Q
5	2	Matthew Rose	Canada	23.32	
6	7	Stavros Michaelides	Cyprus	23.66	
7	8	Ryan Pini	Papua New Guinea	24.10	
8	1	Jonathon Winter	New Zealand	24.13	

==== Semifinal 2 ====
Rank	Lane	Name	Nation	Result	Notes
1	4	Brett Hawke	Australia	22.29	Q, GR
2	6	Mark Foster	England	22.45	Q
3	5	Ashley Callus	Australia	22.67	Q
4	3	Nicholas Folker	South Africa	23.23	Q
5	2	Chris Cozens	England	23.30	
6	7	Chrysanthos Papachrysanthou	Cyprus	23.38	
7	1	Steven Evans	Wales	23.77	
8	8	Alexis Militis	Jersey	23.92	

=== Final ===
The final was held on 4 August at 17:30.

Rank	Lane	Name	Nation	Result	Notes
1st place, gold medalist(s)	3	Roland Schoeman	South Africa	22.33	
2nd place, silver medalist(s)	4	Brett Hawke	Australia	22.34	
3rd place, bronze medalist(s)	5	Mark Foster	England	22.47	
4	6	Ryk Neethling	South Africa	22.49	
5	2	Ashley Callus	Australia	22.67	
6	1	Matt Kidd	England	22.93	
7	7	Craig Hutchison	Canada	23.03	
8	8	Nicholas Folker	South Africa	23.40	
