= Swimming at the 2002 Commonwealth Games – Men's 100 metre freestyle =

Men's 100 metre freestyle at the 2002 Commonwealth Games
- Venue: Manchester Aquatics Centre
- Dates: 1 August (Heats, Semifinals), 2 August (Final)
- Competitors: 37 from 22 nations
- Winning time: 48.73

Medalists
gold medal	Ian Thorpe	Australia
silver medal	Ashley Callus	Australia
bronze medal	Ryk Neethling	South Africa

The Men's 100 metre freestyle event at the 2002 Commonwealth Games was held on 1 and 2 August at the Manchester Aquatics Centre.

== Records ==
Prior to this competition, the existing world record was as follows;

World record	Pieter Van Den Hoogenband (NED)	47.84	Sydney, Australia	19 September 2000
Commonwealth record				
Games record				

The following records were established during the competition:

Date	Event	Name	Nationality	Time	Record
1 August	Semifinal	Ian Thorpe	Australia	49.31	GR
2 August	Final	Ian Thorpe	Australia	48.73	GR

== Results ==
=== Heats ===
The 16 fastest swimmers in the heats qualified for the semifinals.

Rank	Heat	Lane	Name	Nationality	Time	Notes
1	5	4	Ian Thorpe	Australia	49.76	Q
2	3	5	Matt Kidd	England	50.00	Q
3	3	4	Todd Pearson	Australia	50.07	Q
4	4	4	Ashley Callus	Australia	50.16	Q
5	4	3	Brent Hayden	Canada	50.17	Q
6	3	6	Craig Hutchison	Canada	50.54	Q
7	5	3	Ryk Neethling	South Africa	50.59	Q
8	4	6	Anthony Howard	England	50.89	Q
9	3	3	Chris Cozens	England	51.17	Q
10	4	5	Nicholas Folker	South Africa	51.19	Q
11	3	2	Alexandros Aresti	Cyprus	51.96	Q
12	5	2	Carl Probert	Fiji	52.41	Q
13	4	7	Demetris Demetriou	Cyprus	52.45	Q,
14	5	1	Steven Evans	Wales	52.74	Q
15	3	1	Ron Cowen	Bermuda	52.77	Q
16	5	7	Damian Alleyne	Barbados	52.80	Q
17	4	2	Mark Chay	Singapore	52.89	
18	3	7	Moss Burmester	New Zealand	53.21	
19	4	1	Christopher Vythoulkas	Bahamas	53.32	
20	5	8	Christophe Lin Wen Ying	Mauritius	53.90	
21	2	2	Afolabi Adeleke-Adedoyin	Nigeria	54.22	
22	2	4	Alan Jones	Isle of Man	54.72	
23	3	8	Roy-Allan Burch	Bermuda	54.86	
24	4	8	Jamie Peterkin	Saint Lucia	54.90	
25	1	4	Musa Bakare	Nigeria	55.38	
26	2	5	Nicholas Diaper	Kenya	55.50	
27	1	5	Kristoph Carey	Bahamas	55.56	
28	1	6	Ben Lowndes	Guernsey	55.67	
29	1	2	Folahan Oluwole	Nigeria	56.23	
30	2	7	Jean Francois Wai Choon	Mauritius	56.52	
31	2	6	Rama Vyombo	Kenya	56.56	
32	2	1	Eric Williams	Nigeria	56.74	
33	2	3	Hamid Nassir	Kenya	56.75	
34	1	3	Angel Gonzalez	Gibraltar	57.29	
35	1	7	Andre Kuenzli	Zambia	58.77	
36	2	8	Craig Massey-Hicks	Malawi	1:00.07	
37	1	1	Joel Kisuule	Uganda	1:04.17	

=== Semifinals ===
The eight fastest swimmers from the semifinals progressed to the final.

==== Semifinal 1 ====
Rank	Lane	Name	Nation	Result	Notes
1	4	Matt Kidd	England	49.72	Q
2	5	Ashley Callus	Australia	50.05	Q
3	3	Craig Hutchison	Canada	50.28	Q
4	2	Nicholas Folker	South Africa	50.60	Q
5	6	Anthony Howard	England	51.00	
6	8	Damian Alleyne	Barbados	52.49	
7	7	Carl Probert	Fiji	52.82	
8	1	Steven Evans	Wales	52.89	

==== Semifinal 2 ====
Rank	Lane	Name	Nation	Result	Notes
1	4	Ian Thorpe	Australia	49.31	Q, GR
2	6	Ryk Neethling	South Africa	49.91	Q
3	5	Todd Pearson	Australia	50.13	Q
4	3	Brent Hayden	Canada	50.45	Q
5	2	Chris Cozens	England	51.44	
6	7	Alexandros Aresti	Cyprus	52.35	
7	8	Ron Cowen	Bermuda	52.49	
8	1	Demetris Demetriou	Cyprus	52.63	

=== Final ===
The final was held on 2 August at 19:25.

Rank	Lane	Name	Nation	Result	Notes
1st place, gold medalist(s)	4	Ian Thorpe	Australia	48.73	GR
2nd place, silver medalist(s)	6	Ashley Callus	Australia	49.45	
3rd place, bronze medalist(s)	3	Ryk Neethling	South Africa	49.71	
4	5	Matt Kidd	England	49.99	
5	2	Todd Pearson	Australia	50.12	
6	1	Brent Hayden	Canada	50.17	
7	7	Craig Hutchison	Canada	50.40	
8	8	Nicholas Folker	South Africa	51.00	
