= Swimming at the 2002 Commonwealth Games – Men's 4 × 100 metre freestyle relay =

Men's 4 x 100 metres freestyle relay at the 2002 Commonwealth Games
- Venue: Manchester Aquatics Centre
- Dates: 30 July 2002
- Competitors: 40 from 10 nations
- Winning time: 3:16.42

Medalists
gold medal	Ashley Callus, Todd Pearson, Grant Hackett, Ian Thorpe	Australia
silver medal	Roland Schoeman, Hendrik Odendaal, Lyndon Ferns, Ryk Neethling	South Africa
bronze medal	Brent Hayden, Craig Hutchison, Matthew Rose, Rick Say	Canada

The men's 4 x 100 metres freestyle relay event at the 2002 Commonwealth Games was held on 30 July at the Manchester Aquatics Centre.

== Results ==
=== Heats ===
Rank	Heat	Lane	Nation	Swimmers	Time	Notes
1st place, gold medalist(s)	2	4	Australia	Ashley Callus; Adam Pine; Leon Dunne; Todd Pearson	3:20.70	Q
2nd place, silver medalist(s)	2	2	South Africa	Gerhard Zandberg; Lyndon Ferns; Hendrik Odendaal; Nicholas Folker	3:22.35	Q
3rd place, bronze medalist(s)	2	5	Canada	Brent Hayden; Craig Hutchison; Matthew Rose; Brian Johns	3:23.06	Q
4	1	4	England	Anthony Howard; Chris Cozens; Matt Kidd; Adam Ruckwood	3:25.05	Q
5	1	2	Cyprus	Chrysanthos Papachrysanthou; Alexandros Aresti; Stavros Michaelides; Demetris Demetriou	3:32.96	Q
6	2	3	Barbados	Terrence Haynes; Cliff Gittens; Sean Dehere; Damian Alleyne	3:36.13	Q
7	1	5	Bahamas	Christopher Vythoulkas; Kristoph Carey; Travano McPhee; Jeremy Knowles	3:37.66	Q
8	2	6	Isle of Man	Alan Jones; Dave Batty; Adam Richards; Dane Harrop	3:45.06	Q
9	1	3	Kenya	Nicholas Diaper; Rama Vyombo; Kabir Walia; Hamid Nassir	3:49.59	
10	1	6	Malawi	David Korpela; Yona Walesi; Rory Buck; Craig Massey-Hicks	4:17.83	

=== Final ===
Rank	Lane	Nation	Swimmers	Time	Notes
1st place, gold medalist(s)	4	Australia	Ashley Callus; Todd Pearson; Grant Hackett; Ian Thorpe	3:16.42	GR
2nd place, silver medalist(s)	5	South Africa	Roland Schoeman; Hendrik Odendaal; Lyndon Ferns; Ryk Neethling	3:18.86	
3rd place, bronze medalist(s)	3	Canada	Brent Hayden; Craig Hutchison; Matthew Rose; Rick Say	3:19.39	
4	6	England	Chris Cozens; Matt Kidd; Adam Ruckwood; Anthony Howard	3:20.72	
5	2	Cyprus	Chrysanthos Papachrysanthou; Alexandros Aresti; Stavros Michaelides; Demetris Demetriou	3:27.82	
6	7	Barbados	Damian Alleyne; Terrence Haynes; Sean Dehere; Cliff Gittens	3:33.91	
7	1	Bahamas	Christopher Vythoulkas; Kristoph Carey; Travano McPhee; Jeremy Knowles	3:34.05	
8	8	Isle of Man	Alan Jones; Dave Batty; Adam Richards; Dane Harrop	3:44.62	
