= Swimming at the 2002 Commonwealth Games – Men's 100 metre butterfly =

Men's 100 metre butterfly at the 2002 Commonwealth Games
- Venue: Manchester Aquatics Centre
- Dates: 2 August (heats & semifinals); 3 August (final)
- Competitors: 31 from 16 nations
- Winning time: 52.36

Medalists
gold medal	Geoff Huegill	Australia
silver medal	Mike Mintenko	Canada
bronze medal	Adam Pine	Australia

The men's 100 metre butterfly event at the 2002 Commonwealth Games as part of the swimming programme took place on 2 and 3 August at the Manchester Aquatics Centre in Manchester, England.

== Records ==
Prior to this competition, the existing world and games records were as follows.

World record	(Australia) Michael Klim	51.81	Canberra, Australia	12 December 1999
Games record	(Australia) Geoff Huegill	52.81	Kuala Lumpur, Malaysia	

== Schedule ==
The schedule was as follows:

All times are local time

Date	Time	Round
Friday 2 August	10:25	Heats
Friday 2 August	19:59	Semifinals
Saturday 3 August	19:00	Final

== Results ==
=== Heats ===
The 16 fastest swimmers in the heats qualified for the semifinals.

Rank	Heat	Lane	Name	Nationality	Time	Notes
1	3	4	Mike Mintenko	Canada	53.72	Q
2	4	5	James Hickman	England	53.90	Q
3	4	4	Geoff Huegill	Australia	54.18	Q
4	2	5	Todd Cooper	Scotland	54.42	Q
4	3	5	Theo Verster	South Africa	54.42	Q
6	2	4	Adam Pine	Australia	54.44	Q
7	2	2	Hendrik Odendaal	South Africa	54.84	Q
8	4	3	David Bennett	England	55.16	Q
9	2	6	Moss Burmester	New Zealand	55.24	Q
10	3	3	Steve Parry	England	55.25	Q
11	3	6	Heath Ramsay	Australia	55.32	Q
12	2	3	Adam Sioui	Canada	55.51	Q
13	4	6	Nicholas Sheeran	New Zealand	55.59	Q
14	4	2	Lyndon Ferns	South Africa	55.70	Q
15	3	2	Ryan Pini	Papua New Guinea	55.77	Q
16	4	7	Chris Vythoulkas	Bahamas	57.20	Q
17	1	1	Conrad Francis	Sri Lanka	57.40	
18	3	1	Christophe Lim Wen Ying	Mauritius	58.64	
19	4	1	Jean-Paul Adam	Seychelles	59.14	
20	2	1	Musa Bakare	Nigeria	59.17	
21	3	7	Nicholas Diaper	Kenya	59.31	
22	1	4	Travano McPhee	Bahamas	59.47	
23	2	7	Jewel Ahmed	Bangladesh	59.73	
23	2	8	Adam Richards	Isle of Man	59.73	
25	1	6	Ben Lowndes	Guernsey	59.74	
26	1	5	Alan Jones	Isle of Man	59.90	
27	1	3	Hamid Nassir	Kenya	59.91	
28	4	8	Bertrand Bristol	Seychelles	1:00.25	
29	1	2	Ben Wells	Papua New Guinea	1:00.88	
30	3	8	Kristoph Carey	Bahamas	1:01.50	
31	1	7	Rama Vyombo	Kenya	1:01.70	

=== Semifinals ===
The 8 fastest swimmers in the semifinals qualified for the final.

Rank	Heat	Lane	Name	Nationality	Time	Notes
1	2	5	Geoff Huegill	Australia	52.36	Q, GR
2	2	4	Mike Mintenko	Canada	53.33	Q
3	1	3	Adam Pine	Australia	53.47	Q
4	1	4	James Hickman	England	53.70	Q
5	1	5	Theo Verster	South Africa	54.36	Q
6	2	3	Todd Cooper	Scotland	54.38	Q
7	1	2	Steve Parry	England	54.72	Q
8	1	6	David Bennett	England	54.84	Q
9	2	2	Moss Burmester	New Zealand	54.96	
10	1	7	Adam Sioui	Canada	55.20	
11	2	6	Hendrik Odendaal	South Africa	55.32	
12	2	7	Heath Ramsay	Australia	55.42	
13	2	8	Ryan Pini	Papua New Guinea	55.60	
14	1	1	Lyndon Ferns	South Africa	55.80	
15	2	1	Nicholas Sheeran	New Zealand	55.89	
16	1	8	Chris Vythoulkas	Bahamas	56.54	

=== Final ===
The final was held on 3 August at 19:00.

Rank	Lane	Name	Nationality	Time	Notes
1st place, gold medalist(s)	4	Geoff Huegill	Australia	52.36	=GR
2nd place, silver medalist(s)	5	Mike Mintenko	Canada	52.80	
3rd place, bronze medalist(s)	3	Adam Pine	Australia	53.02	
4	6	James Hickman	England	53.32	
5	2	Theo Verster	South Africa	54.03	
6	7	Todd Cooper	Scotland	54.33	
7	1	Steve Parry	England	55.17	
8	8	David Bennett	England	55.24	
