= Swimming at the 2002 Commonwealth Games – Men's 4 × 100 metre medley relay =

Men's 4 × 100 metre medley relay at the 2002 Commonwealth Games
- Venue: Manchester Aquatics Centre
- Dates: 4 August
- Competitors: 32 from 8 nations
- Winning time: 3:36.05

Medalists
gold medal	Matt Welsh, Jim Piper, Geoff Huegill, Ian Thorpe	Australia
silver medal	Adam Ruckwood, Adam Whitehead, James Hickman, Matthew Kidd	England
bronze medal	Riley Janes, Morgan Knabe, Mike Mintenko, Brent Hayden	Canada

The men's 4 × 100 metre medley relay event at the 2002 Commonwealth Games as part of the swimming programme took place on 4 August at the Manchester Aquatics Centre in Manchester, England.

== Records ==
Prior to this competition, the existing world and games records were as follows.

World record	United States; Lenny Krayzelburg; Ed Moses; Ian Crocker; Gary Hall Jr.	3:33.73	Sydney, Australia	23 September 2000
Games record	Australia; Josh Watson; Geoff Huegill; Simon Cowley; Michael Klim	3:38.52	Kuala Lumpur, Malaysia	

== Results ==
The straight final was held on 4 August at 19:08.

Rank	Lane	Nation	Swimmers	Time	Notes
1st place, gold medalist(s)	4	Australia	Matt Welsh; Jim Piper; Geoff Huegill; Ian Thorpe	3:36.05	GR
2nd place, silver medalist(s)	3	England	Adam Ruckwood; Adam Whitehead; James Hickman; Matthew Kidd	3:38.37	
3rd place, bronze medalist(s)	5	Canada	Riley Janes; Morgan Knabe; Mike Mintenko; Brent Hayden	3:38.91	
4	8	South Africa	Gerhard Zandberg; Brett Petersen; Roland Schoeman; Ryk Neethling	3:39.02	
5	6	Scotland	Gregor Tait; Ian Edmond; Todd Cooper; David Leith	3:43.55	
6	2	Isle of Man	Dane Harrop; Dave Batty; Adam Richards; Alan Jones	4:04.54	
7	1	Nigeria	Folahan Oluwole; Eric Williams; Musa Bakare; Afolabi Adeleke-Adedoyin	4:09.28	
—	7	Kenya	Kabir Walia; Hamid Nassir; Nicholas Diaper; Rama Vyombo	DNF	
