= Swimming at the 2002 Commonwealth Games – Men's 50 metre backstroke =

2002 sporting event

Men's 50 metre backstroke at the 2002 Commonwealth Games
- Venue: Manchester Aquatics Centre
- Dates: 30–31 July 2002
- Competitors: 33 from 22 nations
- Winning time: 25.65

Medalists
gold medal	Matt Welsh	Australia
silver medal	Alex Lim	Malaysia
bronze medal	Gerhard Zandberg	South Africa

The men's 50 metre backstroke event at the 2002 Commonwealth Games was held on 30 to 31 July at the Manchester Aquatics Centre.

== Results ==
=== Heats ===
Rank	Heat	Lane	Name	Nationality	Time	Notes
1	5	4	Matt Welsh	Australia	26.04	Q
2	4	4	Riley Janes	Canada	26.06	Q
3	5	7	Alex Lim	Malaysia	26.14	Q
4	5	5	Gerhard Zandberg	South Africa	26.25	Q
5	3	4	Ethan Rolff	Australia	26.52	Q
6	3	5	Martin Harris	England	26.60	Q
7	4	3	Gregor Tait	Scotland	26.65	Q
8	5	2	Roland Schoeman	South Africa	26.69	Q
9	5	3	Adam Ruckwood	England	26.70	Q
9	5	6	James Veldman	Canada	26.70	Q
11	4	2	Ryan Pini	Papua New Guinea	26.75	Q
11	4	6	Simon Burnett	England	26.75	Q
13	4	7	Nicholas Neckles	Barbados	26.88	Q
14	3	3	Robert van der Zant	Australia	26.91	Q
15	3	6	Cameron Gibson	New Zealand	26.98	Q
16	3	7	Jonathan Winter	New Zealand	27.46	Q
17	4	1	Mark Chay	Singapore	27.70	
18	4	5	Tobias Oriwol	Canada	27.82	
19	3	2	Ramon James	Jamaica	27.99	
20	5	1	Alexis Militis	Jersey	28.07	
21	3	1	Dane Harrop	Isle of Man	28.28	
22	4	8	Andrew Mackay	Cayman Islands	28.55	
23	5	8	Carl Probert	Fiji	28.97	
24	3	8	Ian Powel	Guernsey	29.06	
25	2	7	Folahan Oluwole	Nigeria	29.26	
26	2	5	Roy-Allan Burch	Bermuda	29.53	
27	2	4	Mohammad Rubel Rana	Bangladesh	29.59	
28	1	5	Jonathon Le Noury	Guernsey	29.68	
29	1	4	Lateef Aliasau	Nigeria	30.34	
30	2	6	Jamie Zammitt	Gibraltar	30.37	
31	1	3	Rama Vyombo	Kenya	30.52	
32	2	3	Kabir Walia	Kenya	30.79	
33	2	2	Jean Francois Wai Choon	Mauritius	31.15	

=== Semifinals ===
Rank	Heat	Lane	Name	Nationality	Time	Notes
1	2	4	Matt Welsh	Australia	25.86	Q, GR
2	1	4	Riley Janes	Canada	25.96	Q
3	1	5	Gerhard Zandberg	South Africa	26.05	Q
4	2	5	Alex Lim	Malaysia	26.20	Q
5	2	3	Ethan Rolff	Australia	26.23	Q
6	2	2	James Veldman	Canada	26.33	Q
7	2	1	Robert van der Zant	Australia	26.45	Q
8	1	3	Martin Harris	England	26.49	Q
9	2	6	Gregor Tait	Scotland	26.52	
10	1	6	Adam Ruckwood	England	26.54	
11	2	7	Ryan Pini	Papua New Guinea	26.64	
12	1	2	Simon Burnett	England	26.78	
13	1	1	Cameron Gibson	New Zealand	26.97	
14	1	7	Nicholas Neckles	Barbados	27.12	
15	2	8	Jonathan Winter	New Zealand	27.43	
16	1	8	Mark Chay	Singapore	27.50	

=== Final ===
Rank	Lane	Name	Nationality	Time	Notes
1st place, gold medalist(s)	4	Matt Welsh	Australia	25.65	GR
2nd place, silver medalist(s)	6	Alex Lim	Malaysia	25.67	
3rd place, bronze medalist(s)	3	Gerhard Zandberg	South Africa	25.89	
4	5	Riley Janes	Canada	26.05	
5	7	James Veldman	Canada	26.20	
6	2	Ethan Rolff	Australia	26.47	
7	8	Martin Harris	England	26.56	
8	1	Robert van der Zant	Australia	26.67	
