= Swimming at the 2006 Commonwealth Games – Men's 50 metre freestyle =

The men's 50 m freestyle was held at the Melbourne Sports and Aquatic Centre (MSAC) on the 20th and 21 March 2006.

== Men's 50 m Freestyle - Final ==
Pos.	Lane	Athlete	R.T.	50 m	Tbh.
	5	(South Africa) Roland Schoeman (RSA)	0.66	22.03 (GR)	
	3	(Canada) Brent Hayden (CAN)	0.75	22.19	0.16
	4	(Australia) Brett Hawke (AUS)	0.73	22.31	0.28
4	2	(England) Mark Foster (ENG)	0.85	22.49	0.46
5	8	(Australia) Eamon Sullivan (AUS)	0.68	22.61	0.58
6	6	(Canada) Matthew Rose (CAN)	0.68	22.65	0.62
6	7	(South Africa) Ryk Neethling (RSA)	0.68	22.65	0.62
8	1	(Australia) Ashley Callus (AUS)	0.65	22.71	0.68

== Men's 50 m Freestyle - SemiFinals ==
=== Men's 50 m Freestyle - Semifinal 01 ===
Pos.	Lane	Athlete	R.T.	50 m	Tbh.
1	4	(South Africa) Roland Schoeman (RSA)	0.63	22.47	
2	5	(South Africa) Ryk Neethling (RSA)	0.75	22.80	0.33
3	3	(Australia) Ashley Callus (AUS)	0.62	22.90	0.43
4	2	(Scotland) Craig Houston (SCO)	0.80	23.31	0.84
5	6	(Canada) Yannick Lupien (CAN)	0.78	23.43	0.96
6	7	(Fiji) Carl Probert (FIJ)	0.72	23.65	1.18
7	1	(Kenya) David Dunford (KEN)	0.89	24.05	1.58
8	8	(Singapore) Zhirong Tay (SIN)	0.64	24.29	1.82

=== Men's 50 m Freestyle - Semifinal 02 ===
Pos.	Lane	Athlete	R.T.	50 m	Tbh.
1	5	(Australia) Brett Hawke (AUS)	0.73	22.30 (GR)	
2	4	(South Africa) Roland Schoeman (RSA)	0.81	22.43	0.13
3	6	(England) Mark Foster (ENG)	0.86	22.61	0.31
4	3	(South Africa) Ryk Neethling (RSA)	0.77	22.70	0.40
5	2	(South Africa) Karl Thaning (RSA)	0.75	23.06	0.76
6	1	(Canada) Yannick Lupien (CAN)	0.75	23.15	0.85
7	7	(Scotland) Craig Houston (SCO)	0.80	23.33	1.03
8	8	(Cyprus) Chrysanthos Papachrysanthou (CYP)	0.79	23.68	1.38

== Men's 50 m Freestyle - Heats ==
=== Men's 50 m Freestyle - Heat 01 ===
Pos.	Lane	Athlete	R.T.	50 m	Tbh.
1	5	(Canada) Brent Hayden (CAN)	0.76	22.52	
2	3	(Canada) Matthew Rose (CAN)	0.71	22.76	0.24
3	4	(Australia) Eamon Sullivan (AUS)	0.65	22.94	0.42
4	6	(Cyprus) Chrysanthos Papachrysanthou (CYP)	0.78	23.70	1.18
5	1	(Jersey) Alexis Militis (JER)	0.80	24.31	1.79
6	8	(Singapore) Shirong Su (SIN)	0.68	24.35	1.83
7	7	(Jamaica) Brad Hamilton (JAM)	0.65	24.57	2.05
DNS	2	(New Zealand) Cameron Gibson (NZL)			

=== Men's 50 m Freestyle - Heat 02 ===
Pos.	Lane	Athlete	R.T.	50 m	Tbh.
1	3	(Eswatini) Luke Hall (SWZ)	0.68	25.13	
1	4	(Guernsey) Ian Hubert (GUE)	0.68	25.13	
3	6	(Guernsey) Jeremy Osborne (GUE)	0.84	25.17	0.04
4	7	(Guernsey) Ben Lowndes (GUE)	0.80	25.33	0.20
5	1	(Sri Lanka) Stefan Lee (SRI)	0.81	25.58	0.45
6	5	(Seychelles) Adrian Nanty (SEY)	0.80	25.87	0.74
7	2	(Sri Lanka) Anthony Wickramasinghe (SRI)	0.76	26.17	1.04
8	8	(Maldives) Hassan Ashraf (MDV)	0.69	29.18	4.05

=== Men's 50 m Freestyle - Heat 03 ===
Pos.	Lane	Athlete	R.T.	50 m	Tbh.
1	4	(The Bahamas) Chris Vythoulkas (BAH)	0.72	24.84	
2	6	(Mauritius) Gael Adam (MRI)	0.79	25.42	0.58
3	3	(Sri Lanka) Arun Karunaratne (SRI)	0.80	25.56	0.72
4	5	(Bangladesh) Monirul Kazi (BAN)	0.83	25.69	0.85
5	1	(Namibia) Alexander Ray (NAM)	0.68	25.70	0.86
5	2	(Mozambique) Leonel Matonse (MOZ)	0.68	25.70	0.86
5	8	(Bangladesh) Md Jewel Ahmed (BAN)	0.68	25.70	0.86
8	7	(Grenada) Naji Ferguson (GRN)	0.86	25.76	0.92

=== Men's 50 m Freestyle - Heat 04 ===
Pos.	Lane	Athlete	R.T.	50 m	Tbh.
1	5	(Canada) Brent Hayden (CAN)	0.76	22.52	
2	3	(Canada) Matthew Rose (CAN)	0.71	22.76	0.24
3	4	(Australia) Eamon Sullivan (AUS)	0.65	22.94	0.42
4	6	(Cyprus) Chrysanthos Papachrysanthou (CYP)	0.78	23.70	1.18
5	1	(Jersey) Alexis Militis (JER)	0.80	24.31	1.79
6	8	(Singapore) Shirong Su (SIN)	0.68	24.35	1.83
7	7	(Jamaica) Brad Hamilton (JAM)	0.65	24.57	2.05
DNS	2	(New Zealand) Cameron Gibson (NZL)			

=== Men's 50 m Freestyle - Heat 05 ===
Pos.	Lane	Athlete	R.T.	50 m	Tbh.
1	4	(Australia) Brett Hawke (AUS)	0.69	22.72	
2	5	(England) Mark Foster (ENG)	0.83	22.91	0.19
3	2	(South Africa) Karl Thaning (RSA)	0.76	22.97	0.25
4	3	(England) Christopher Cozens (ENG)	0.75	23.14	0.42
5	7	(Papua New Guinea) Ryan Pini (PNG)	0.77	23.41	0.69
6	6	(Wales) Owen Morgan (WAL)	0.75	23.71	0.99
7	8	(Kenya) Ramadhan Vyombo (KEN)	0.72	24.40	1.68
8	1	(Bermuda) Ronald Cowen (BER)	0.80	24.58	1.86

=== Men's 50 m Freestyle - Heat 06 ===
Pos.	Lane	Athlete	R.T.	50 m	Tbh.
1	4	(South Africa) Roland Schoeman (RSA)	0.63	22.47	
2	5	(South Africa) Ryk Neethling (RSA)	0.75	22.80	0.33
3	3	(Australia) Ashley Callus (AUS)	0.62	22.90	0.43
4	2	(Scotland) Craig Houston (SCO)	0.80	23.31	0.84
5	6	(Canada) Yannick Lupien (CAN)	0.78	23.43	0.96
6	7	(Fiji) Carl Probert (FIJ)	0.72	23.65	1.18
7	1	(Kenya) David Dunford (KEN)	0.89	24.05	1.58
8	8	(Singapore) Zhirong Tay (SIN)	0.64	24.29	1.82
