= Swimming at the 2001 World Aquatics Championships – Men's 50 metre freestyle =

Men's 50 metre freestyle at the 2001 FINA World Championships
- Dates: 22 July 2001 (heats, semifinals); 23 July 2001 (final)
- Competitors: 92 from 68 nations
- Winning time: 22.09 seconds

Medalists
gold medal	Anthony Ervin	United States
silver medal	Pieter v.d. Hoogenband	Netherlands
bronze medal	Tomohiro Yamanoi	Japan
bronze medal	Roland Schoeman	South Africa

The men's 50 metre freestyle event at the 2001 World Aquatics Championships was held on 22 (heats and semifinals) and 23 July 2001 (final) at the Fukuoka, Japan.

== Records ==
Prior to the competition, the existing world and championship records were as follows:

World record	Alexander Popov (RUS)	21.64	Moscow, Russia	16 June 2000
Championship record	Tom Jager (USA)	22.16	Perth, Australia	12 January 1991

The following record was established during the competition:

Date	Round	Name	Nationality	Time	Record
22 July	Semifinal 2	Anthony Ervin	United States	22.05	CR

== Results ==
=== Heats ===
Rank	Swimmer	Nation	Time	Notes
1	Brett Hawke	Australia	22.18	Q, OC
2	José Meolans	Argentina	22.31	Q
3	Julio Santos	Ecuador	22.34	Q, NR
4	Bartosz Kizierowski	Poland	22.39	Q
4	Roland Schoeman	South Africa	22.39	Q
6	Ashley Callus	Australia	22.42	Q
6	Anthony Ervin	United States	22.42	Q
8	Jason Lezak	United States	22.45	Q
9	Johan Kenkhuis	Netherlands	22.47	Q
10	Pieter van den Hoogenband	Netherlands	22.48	Q
10	Stefan Nystrand	Sweden	22.48	Q
12	Mark Foster	United Kingdom	22.51	Q
12	Vyacheslav Shyrshov	Ukraine	22.51	Q
14	Ricardo Busquets	Puerto Rico	22.70	Q
15	Tomohiro Yamanoi	Japan	22.75	Q
16	Attila Zubor	Hungary	22.76	Q
17	Salim Iles	Algeria	22.78	
17	Edvaldo Valério	Brazil	22.78	
19	Oleksandr Volynets	Ukraine	22.84	
20	Christoph Bühler	Switzerland	22.89	
21	Lorenzo Vismara	Italy	22.91	
22	Karel Novy	Switzerland	22.94	
23	Riley Janes	Canada	22.95	
23	Ravil Nachaev	Uzbekistan	22.95	
25	Marijan Kanjer	Croatia	22.98	
25	Milorad Čavić	Yugoslavia	22.98	
27	Camilo Becerra	Colombia	22.99	
27	Leonid Khokhlov	Russia	22.99	
29	Jere Hård	Finland	23.00	
30	Nicholas Santos	Brazil	23.04	
31	Rolandas Gimbutis	Lithuania	23.08	
32	Nicholas Folker	South Africa	23.09	
33	Peter Mankoč	Slovenia	23.19	
34	Duje Draganja	Croatia	23.25	
35	Eric La Fleur	Sweden	23.38	
36	Kim Min-Seok	South Korea	23.41	
37	Oswaldo Quevedo	Venezuela	23.47	
38	Shunsuke Ito	Japan	23.60	
39	Arwut Chinnapasaen	Thailand	23.77	
40	Brendan Ashby	Zimbabwe	23.87	
41	Wu Nien-Pin	Chinese Taipei	23.96	
42	Jesús González	Mexico	24.03	
43	Carl Probert	Fiji	24.12	
44	Alejandro Siqueiros	Mexico	24.14	
45	Ismael Ortiz	Panama	24.16	
46	Leslie Kwok	Singapore	24.18	
47	Danil Haustov	Estonia	24.22	
48	Harbeth Fu Wing	Hong Kong	24.32	
49	Gustavo Barrios	Panama	24.33	
50	Khuwaiter Saeed Hadi Al Shaleri	United Arab Emirates	24.34	
51	Christophe Lim Wen Ying	Mauritius	24.36	
52	Gregory Arkhurst	Ivory Coast	24.40	
53	Cliff Ansel Matthew Gittens	Barbados	24.58	
54	Ernest Teo	Singapore	24.59	
55	Yu Lung Lubrey Lim	Malaysia	24.97	
56	Chon Kit Alias Joao Tang	Macau	25.00	
57	Nicholas Diaper	Kenya	25.06	
58	Kenny Roberts	Seychelles	25.09	
59	Malick Fall	Senegal	25.16	
60	Graham Smith	Bermuda	25.27	
60	Khaly Ciss	Senegal	25.27	
62	Keng Ip Lou	Macau	25.29	
63	Gael Souci	Mauritius	25.33	
64	Davy Bisslik	Aruba	25.39	
65	João Aguiar	Angola	25.72	
66	Barnsley Albert	Seychelles	25.75	
67	Hamid Nassir	Kenya	25.79	
67	Naji Fesguson	Grenada	25.79	
69	Zieahmed Ouattara	Ivory Coast	26.02	
70	Omar Núñez	Nicaragua	26.08	
71	Kenneth Maronie	Dominica	26.18	
72	Yang Shang-Hsuan	Chinese Taipei	26.29	
73	Le Minh Trong Le	Vietnam	26.30	
74	Loren Lindborg	Marshall Islands	26.32	
75	Onan Orlando Thom	Guyana	26.37	
76	William Kang	Guam	26.42	
77	Sule Cole Shade	Cameroon	26.51	
78	Rainui Teriipaia	Tahiti	26.60	
79	Ganaa Galbadrakh	Mongolia	26.70	
80	Nuno Miguel Cardoso Rola	Angola	26.87	
81	Hesham Shehab	Brunei	27.05	
82	Mark Unpingco	Guam	27.16	
83	Joe Atuhaire	Uganda	27.81	
84	Rony Bakale	Republic of the Congo	28.55	
85	Mahamad Ahmad	Sudan	28.86	
86	Abbas Alneel	Sudan	29.45	
87	Fabrice Ndikumana	Burundi	30.64	
88	Eric Moussambani	Equatorial Guinea	31.88	NR
89	Carlos Notarianni	Marshall Islands	32.41	
90	Joshua Marfleet	Samoa	34.91	
91	Glyn Tonge	Netherlands Antilles	37.75	
–	Richard Sam Bera	Indonesia	DNS	

=== Semifinals ===
Rank	Name	Nationality	Time	Notes
1	Anthony Ervin	United States	22.05	Q, CR
2	Pieter van den Hoogenband	Netherlands	22.14	Q
3	Mark Foster	United Kingdom	22.19	Q
4	Vyacheslav Shyrshov	Ukraine	22.30	Q
5	Stefan Nystrand	Sweden	22.31	Q
6	Roland Schoeman	South Africa	22.34	Q
6	Brett Hawke	Australia	22.34	Q
8	Tomohiro Yamanoi	Japan	22.37	Q
9	Bartosz Kizierowski	Poland	22.42	
10	Jason Lezak	United States	22.43	
11	José Meolans	Argentina	22.45	
12	Ashley Callus	Australia	22.46	
13	Johan Kenkhuis	Netherlands	22.51	
14	Attila Zubor	Hungary	22.54	
15	Julio Santos	Ecuador	22.64	
16	Ricardo Busquets	Puerto Rico	22.83	

=== Final ===
Rank	Name	Nationality	Time	Notes
1st place, gold medalist(s)	Anthony Ervin	United States	22.09	
2nd place, silver medalist(s)	Pieter van den Hoogenband	Netherlands	22.16	
3rd place, bronze medalist(s)	Tomohiro Yamanoi	Japan	22.18	
3rd place, bronze medalist(s)	Roland Schoeman	South Africa	22.18	
5	Brett Hawke	Australia	22.39	
6	Vyacheslav Shyrshov	Ukraine	22.42	
7	Stefan Nystrand	Sweden	22.44	
7	Mark Foster	United Kingdom	22.44	
