= Hendrik Odendaal =

South African swimmer and family practice MD

Personal information
- Full name: Hendrik Odendaal
- Nationality: South African
- Born: 9 October 1979 (age 47)
- Height: 1.95 m (6 ft 5 in)
- Weight: 93 kg (205 lb)

Sport
- Sport: Swimming
- Strokes: freestyle, butterfly
Medal record
Commonwealth Games
Silver medal – second place	2002 Manchester	4×100 m freestyle
- Updated on 22 January 2014

Hendrik Odendaal (born 9 October 1979) is a South African swimmer.

== Career ==
Odendaal competed for South Africa at the 2002 Commonwealth Games in Manchester where he finished 11th in semi-finals of the 100 metre butterfly in 55.32, 15th in semi-finals of the 50 metre butterfly in 25.08 and with Roland Schoeman, Lyndon Ferns and Ryk Neethling won silver in the 4 × 100 metre freestyle relay in 3:18.86.

== See also ==
- List of Commonwealth Games medallists in swimming (men)
