= 2008 FINA World Swimming Championships (25 m) – Men's 50 metre freestyle =

Men's 50 metre freestyle at the 2008 FINA World Swimming Championships (25 m)
- Venue: Manchester Arena
- Location: Manchester, England
- Dates: 10 April (heats and semis); 11 April (final)
- Competitors: 108 from 74 nations
- Winning time: 20.81 WR

Medalists
gold medal	Duje Draganja	Croatia
silver medal	Mark Foster	Great Britain
bronze medal	Gerhard Zandberg	South Africa

Official video

The men's 50 metre freestyle competition of the 2008 FINA World Swimming Championships (25 m) was held on 10 and 11 April 2008 at the Manchester Arena.

The event was won by the defending champion Croatian Duje Draganja in a new world record time of 20.81 seconds, breaking the previous mark set by Sweden's Stefan Nystrand six months earlier by 0.12 seconds. Swimming in lane 1 in the final, Draganja also broke the championship record of 21.31 set by Cullen Jones of the United States in Shanghai in 2006.

Great Britain's Mark Foster won the silver medal, finishing a half a second behind Draganja while Gerhard Zandberg of South Africa finished third in 21.33.

== Records ==
Prior to the competition, the existing world and championship records were as follows.

	Name	Nation	Time	Location	Date
World record	Stefan Nystrand	Sweden	20.93	Berlin	18 November 2007
Championship record	Cullen Jones	United States	21.31	Shanghai	6 April 2006

== Results ==
=== Heats ===
Rank	Heat	Lane	Name	Nationality	Time	Notes
1	12	8	Bryan Lundquist	United States	21.44	Q
2	13	4	Mark Foster	Great Britain	21.60	Q
3	6	1	Ryan Lochte	United States	21.61	Q
4	14	4	Duje Draganja	Croatia	21.67	Q
=5	12	6	Grant Brits	Australia	21.77	Q
=5	14	1	Nabil Kebbab	Algeria	21.77	Q
7	14	8	Jernej Godec	Slovenia	21.81	Q
8	12	1	Eduardo Lorente	Spain	21.88	Q
9	9	5	David Dunford	Kenya	21.89	Q
=10	11	3	Jason Dunford	Kenya	21.92	Q
=10	13	5	George Bovell	Trinidad and Tobago	21.92	Q
12	12	4	Gerhard Zandberg	South Africa	21.98	Q
13	14	2	José Meolans	Argentina	22.00	Q
14	10	2	Matthew Tutty	Great Britain	22.03	Q
=15	12	5	Salim Iles	Algeria	22.06	Q
=15	14	5	Fernando Silva	Brazil	22.06	Q
17	12	2	Robert Lijesen	Netherlands	22.11	
18	12	3	Mario Todorović	Croatia	22.20	
19	13	2	Kaan Tayla	Turkey	22.21	
20	13	7	Johannes Dietrich	Germany	22.23	
21	14	7	Flori Lang	Switzerland	22.24	
22	13	3	Shaun Harris	South Africa	22.25	
=23	13	6	Cameron Gibson	New Zealand	22.32	
=23	14	3	Matti Rajakylä	Finland	22.32	
25	10	3	Eduardo Deboni	Brazil	22.34	
26	11	8	Kenrick Monk	Australia	22.37	
27	9	4	Ľuboš Križko	Slovakia	22.38	
28	14	6	Andrey Grechin	Russia	22.44	
29	9	1	Daisuke Abe	Japan	22.56	
30	10	8	Andrey Kapralov	Russia	22.61	
31	11	7	Alexandre Agostinho	Portugal	22.64	
32	10	4	Matías Aguilera	Argentina	22.70	
33	11	1	Paulo Santos	Portugal	22.79	
=34	9	3	Markus Deibler	Germany	22.87	
=34	10	6	Raichin Antonov	Bulgaria	22.87	
36	11	2	Basil Kaaki	Lebanon	22.93	
37	12	7	Huang Shaohua	China	22.94	
38	11	6	Bryan Tay	Singapore	22.97	
39	5	1	Brett Fraser	Cayman Islands	23.08	
40	9	8	Ankur Poseria	India	23.12	
41	10	1	Mohammad Bidarian	Iran	23.14	
42	8	1	Mohamed Mamdouh	Egypt	23.19	
43	10	7	Abdel El-Badrawy	Egypt	23.25	
44	8	6	Charles Walker	Philippines	23.30	
45	10	5	Lao Kuan Fong	Macau	23.31	
46	9	7	Eren Onurlu	Turkey	23.59	
47	9	6	Mikael Koloyan	Armenia	23.62	
48	13	1	Lü Zhiwu	China	23.89	
49	9	2	Yuan Ping	Chinese Taipei	23.90	
50	8	3	Kaspar Raigla	Estonia	23.93	
51	7	3	Joao Matias	Angola	23.94	
52	1	4	Nicko Biondi Ricardo	Indonesia	23.96	
53	8	8	Harutyun Harutyunyan	Armenia	24.00	
=54	7	2	Kieran Locke	United States Virgin Islands	24.03	
=54	8	5	Emin Noshadi	Iran	24.03	
56	7	5	Emile Bakale	Republic of the Congo	24.16	
57	6	5	Zane Jordan	Zambia	24.35	
58	8	4	Chakyl Camal	Mozambique	24.41	
59	8	7	Gael Adam	Mauritius	24.45	
60	7	8	Fernando Medrano	Nicaragua	24.50	
61	7	6	Luke Hall	Eswatini	24.59	
62	7	1	Teymur Guliyev	Azerbaijan	24.77	
63	4	6	Naji Ferguson	Grenada	24.80	
64	5	5	Sidni Hoxha	Albania	24.86	
65	6	4	Heshan Unamboowe	Sri Lanka	24.88	
66	6	6	Radhames Kalaf	Dominican Republic	24.90	
67	5	3	Daryl Harford	Grenada	24.95	
68	6	7	Julien Brice	Saint Lucia	24.96	
69	6	2	Loai Tashkandi	Saudi Arabia	24.98	
70	4	5	Sikandar Khan	Pakistan	25.03	
71	4	7	Bilal Achelhi	Morocco	25.05	
72	6	3	Jonathan Wong	Jamaica	25.07	
=73	5	2	Hazem Tashkandi	Saudi Arabia	25.14	
=73	6	8	Aldi Gugushka	Albania	25.14	
75	4	4	Andreý Molçanow	Turkmenistan	25.23	
76	5	4	Jean-Luc Augier	Saint Lucia	25.29	
77	4	1	Andryein Tamir	Mongolia	25.32	
78	4	3	Chong Cheok Kuan	Macau	25.43	
79	4	2	Shahbaz Khan	Pakistan	25.50	
80	5	8	Mduduzi Xaba	Eswatini	25.60	
81	5	6	Jamie Zammitt	Gibraltar	25.67	
82	3	7	Sergeý Krowýakow	Turkmenistan	25.75	
83	2	6	Kerson Hadley	Federated States of Micronesia	25.80	
84	5	7	Peter Lynch	Zambia	26.03	
85	3	4	Boldbaatar Butekhuils	Mongolia	26.34	
86	7	7	Tural Abbasov	Azerbaijan	26.39	
87	3	6	John Kamyuka	Botswana	26.40	
88	3	3	Sofyan El Gadi	Libya	26.59	
89	3	5	Majed Tawil	Palestine	26.72	
90	3	2	Abdel Adams Ouattara Tegue	Ivory Coast	26.74	
91	4	8	Kouassi Brou	Ivory Coast	26.99	
92	2	2	Ashraf Hassan	Maldives	27.70	
93	3	8	Fouad Alatrash	Palestine	28.10	
94	3	1	Gilbert Kaburu	Uganda	28.49	
95	2	1	Biko Molteni	Tanzania	30.92	
96	1	6	Jacob Yohana	Tanzania	34.21	
	1	3	Yellow Yeiyah	Nigeria		DNS
	1	5	Abib Sereme	Mali		DNS
	2	3	Rene Jacob Yougbara	Burkina Faso		DNS
	2	5	Modou Gaye	Mauritania		DNS
	2	7	Abu Bakarr Jalloh	Sierra Leone		DNS
	2	8	Adama Ouedraogo	Burkina Faso		DNS
	7	4	Artiom Gladun	Moldova		DNS
	8	2	Gleb Cocorin	Moldova		DNS
	11	4	Alessandro Calvi	Italy		DNS
	13	8	Michele Santucci	Italy		DNS
	2	4	Petero Okotai	Cook Islands		DSQ
	11	5	Danil Bugakov	Uzbekistan		DSQ

=== Semifinals ===
The semifinals were held at 19:53.

Rank	Heat	Lane	Name	Nationality	Time	Notes
1	1	4	Mark Foster	Great Britain	21.32	Q
2	2	1	José Meolans	Argentina	21.43	Q
3	2	5	Ryan Lochte	United States	21.46	Q
4	2	4	Bryan Lundquist	United States	21.55	Q
5	2	3	Grant Brits	Australia	21.57	Q
6	2	6	Jernej Godec	Slovenia	21.58	Q
7	1	5	Duje Draganja	Croatia	21.63	Q
8	1	7	Gerhard Zandberg	South Africa	21.72	Q
=9	1	3	Nabil Kebbab	Algeria	21.77	
=9	2	7	George Bovell	Trinidad and Tobago	21.77	
11	2	8	Salim Iles	Algeria	21.80	
12	2	2	David Dunford	Kenya	21.85	
13	1	1	Matthew Tutty	Great Britain	21.90	
=14	1	8	Fernando Silva	Brazil	21.97	
=14	1	6	Eduardo Lorente	Spain	21.97	
=14	1	2	Jason Dunford	Kenya	21.97	

=== Finals ===
The final was held at 20:50.

Rank	Lane	Name	Nationality	Time	Notes
1st place, gold medalist(s)	1	Duje Draganja	Croatia	20.81	WR
2nd place, silver medalist(s)	4	Mark Foster	Great Britain	21.31	
3rd place, bronze medalist(s)	8	Gerhard Zandberg	South Africa	21.33	
4	3	Ryan Lochte	United States	21.44	
5	5	José Meolans	Argentina	21.48	
6	2	Grant Brits	Australia	21.68	
7	7	Jernej Godec	Slovenia	21.74	
8	6	Bryan Lundquist	United States	21.77	
