= Stavros Michaelides =

Cypriot swimmer

Personal information
- Full name: Stavros Michaelides
- National team: Cyprus
- Born: 20 November 1970 (age 55) Limassol, Cyprus
- Height: 1.94 m (6 ft 4 in)
- Weight: 92 kg (203 lb)

Sport
- Sport: Swimming
- Strokes: Freestyle
- College team: Alabama Crimson Tide (USA)
- Coach: Jonty Skinner (USA)
Medal record
Men's swimming
Representing Cyprus
Mediterranean Games
Silver medal – second place	1991 Athens	50 m freestyle
Bronze medal – third place	1993 Languedoc	50 m freestyle
Bronze medal – third place	1997 Bari	50 m freestyle

Stavros Michaelides (also Stavros Mikhailidis, Greek: Σταύρος Μιχαηλίδης; born November 20, 1970) is a Cypriot former swimmer, who specialized in sprint freestyle events. He is a three-time Olympian (1992, 1996, and 2000), a triple medalist at the Mediterranean Games (1991, 1993, and 1997), and a former Cypriot record holder in the 50 m freestyle. In 2003, Michaelides was selected as one of eight Olympians to be the major pioneers of The Race Club in Islamorada, Florida.

== Career ==
=== College career ===
Michaelides attended on an athletic scholarship at the University of Alabama in Tuscaloosa, Alabama, where he played for the Alabama Crimson Tide swimming and diving team under head coach Jonty Skinner. While swimming for the Crimson Tide, Michaelides received a total of nine All-American titles in the freestyle and medley relays before he graduated from the university in 1994. At the 1992 NCAA Men's Swimming and Diving Championships, he helped the Crimson Tide to pull off a sixth-place finish in the 200-yard medley relay with a time of 1:28.34.

=== International career ===
Michaelides made his official worldwide debut at the 1991 Mediterranean Games in Athens, Greece, where he earned a silver medal in the 50 m freestyle (23.65), trailing Italy's René Gusperti by eight hundredths of a second (0.08).

In 1992, Michaelides competed as a member of the Cypriot squad at his first Summer Olympics in Barcelona. He placed almost in the "middle-of-the-road" in any of his individual events, finishing twentieth in the 50 m freestyle (23.34) and forty-fourth in the 100 m freestyle (52.54).

At the 1993 Mediterranean Games in Languedoc-Roussillon, France, Michaelides won a bronze medal in the 50 m freestyle with a time of 23.28. He also helped the Cypriot team pull off a seventh-place effort in the 4 × 100 m freestyle relay, in a final time of 3.38.28.

At the 1996 Summer Olympics in Atlanta, Michaelides placed thirty-first in the 50 m freestyle (23.37) and fiftieth in the 100 m freestyle (52.65), delivering a worst performance in his swimming career.

A year later, at the 1997 Mediterranean Games in Bari, Italy, Michaelides shared a bronze medal with host nation's Lorenzo Vismara in the 50 m freestyle. He posted a lifetime best of 23.28, matching his time in the process four years earlier.

Eight years after competing in his first Olympics, Michaelides qualified for his third Cypriot team, as a 29-year-old, at the 2000 Summer Olympics in Sydney. Swimming only in the 50 m freestyle, he posted a FINA B-standard entry time of 23.08 from the Akropolis Grand Prix in Athens. He challenged seven other swimmers in heat six, including Ukraine's rising favorite Oleksandr Volynets and Lithuania's Rolandas Gimbutis, the tallest swimmer at the Games. Michaelides toppled a new Cypriot record of 23.05 to pick up a third seed in his heat, finishing behind winner Volynets by almost half the body length. Michaelides failed to advance into the semifinals, as he placed twenty-seventh overall in the prelims.

At the 2002 Commonwealth Games in Manchester, England, Michaelides missed the top 8 final in the 50 m freestyle, finishing his semifinal run in twelfth place with a time of 23.66. He also placed fifth, along with his teammates Chrysanthos Papachrysanthou, Alexandros Aresti, and Demetrios Demetriou, in the 4 × 100 m freestyle relay (3:27.82).

In 2003, Michaelides was selected as one of eight Olympians to become the pioneers of The Race Club, a swimming club founded by Olympic champion Gary Hall Jr., and his father Gary Hall Sr., located in Islamorada, Florida.

== Life after swimming ==
A year after The Race Club was founded, in 2004, Michaelides announced his retirement from swimming. He is currently working as a public relations and marketing officer for the Cyprus Olympic Committee.
