= Brett Hawke =

Australian swimmer

Personal information
- Full name: Brett Geoffrey Hawke
- National team: Australia
- Born: 2 June 1975 (age 51) Sydney, New South Wales
- Height: 1.86 m (6 ft 1 in)
- Weight: 86 kg (190 lb)

Sport
- Sport: Swimming
- Strokes: Freestyle
- College team: Auburn University (US)
Medal record
Men's swimming
Representing Australia
World Championships (SC)
Silver medal – second place	1995 Rio	4x100 m freestyle
Silver medal – second place	2002 Moscow	4x100 m medley
Goodwill Games
Bronze medal – third place	2001 Brisbane	50 m freestyle
Pan Pacific Championships
Bronze medal – third place	2002 Yokohama	50 m freestyle
Commonwealth Games
Silver medal – second place	2002 Manchester	50 m freestyle
Silver medal – second place	2006 Melbourne	4x100 m freestyle
Bronze medal – third place	2006 Melbourne	50 m freestyle

Brett Geoffrey Hawke (born 2 June 1975) is a former competitive swimmer who represented Australia at the 2000 Summer Olympics and 2004 Summer Olympics. He was the head coach of the Auburn Tigers swimming and diving team of Auburn University in the United States until 28 March 2018.

== Swimming career ==
Hawke received an athletic scholarship to attend Auburn University in Auburn, Alabama, and swam for the Auburn Tigers swimming and diving team in National Collegiate Athletic Association (NCAA) and Southeastern Conference (SEC) competition from 1996 to 1999. He received seventeen All-American honors and was a nine-time NCAA individual champion, and helped Auburn win two national team championships in his three years as a student-athlete.

Hawke returned to Australia in 1999. For much of his career, Hawke was regarded as the top sprinter in Australia. He is a five-time Australian national champion and former Australian record-holder in the 50-metre freestyle (22.07), which he set in the semifinals of the 2004 Summer Olympics. Hawke retired from competitive swimming after the 2006 Commonwealth Games in Melbourne, where he won the bronze in the 50-metre freestyle and a silver medal as a member of the second-place Australian team in the 4x100-metre freestyle relay. Hawke finished his career with seven international medals.

Hawke trained at The Race Club, a swimming techniques training club founded by Olympic Swimmers Gary Hall, Jr. and his father, Gary Hall, Sr. The Race Club, originally known as "The World Team," was designed to serve as a training group for elite swimmers across the world in preparation for the 2000 Summer Olympics in Sydney. To be eligible to train with the Race Club, a swimmer must either have been ranked in the top 20 in the world the past 3 calendar years or top 3 in their nation in the past year. The Race Club included such well known swimmers as Roland Schoeman, Mark Foster, Ryk Neethling, and Therese Alshammar.

== Coaching career ==
Hawke returned to Auburn in 2006 to serve as an assistant under his former head coach David Marsh. In 2007, Marsh left Auburn and was replaced by Richard Quick. In 2009, Hawke was named head coach after Quick died from an inoperable brain tumor. Quick and Hawke were named 2009 CSCAA Coaches of the Year after the men's swimming and diving program won the national title.

He became a United States citizen in 2009, saying that one of his goals is to coach the U.S. Olympic team in future games.

He was the head coach of the Auburn Tigers swimming and diving team of Auburn University in the United States until 28 March 2018 In October, 2018, Hawke joined the Fitter and Faster Team.

On Tuesday, May 20th, 2025, Hawke was named Head Swim Coach of the Enhanced Games.

== See also ==
- List of Commonwealth Games medallists in swimming (men)
