= Alexandros Aresti =

Cypriot swimmer (born 1983)

Personal information
- Nationality: Cyprus
- Born: 11 March 1983 (age 43) Larnaca, Cyprus
- Height: 1.88 m (6 ft 2 in)
- Weight: 80 kg (176 lb)

Sport
- Sport: Swimming
- Strokes: Freestyle

Alexandros Aresti (Greek: Αλέξανδρος Αρέστη; born 11 March 1983) is a Cypriot former swimmer, who specialized in freestyle events. He is a two-time Olympian (2000 and 2004), and a Cypriot record holder in the 100 and 200 m freestyle.

Aresti made his official debut, as a 17-year-old, at the 2000 Summer Olympics in Sydney, where he competed in the men's 200 m freestyle. Swimming in heat two, he rounded out the field of seven swimmers to last place and forty-ninth overall by a 5.32-second margin behind winner Mark Chay of Singapore in 1:57.54.

At the 2004 Summer Olympics in Athens, Aresti extended his program by qualifying for two swimming events. He cleared FINA B-standard entry times of 51.45 (100 m freestyle) and 1:53.61 (200 m freestyle) from the Akropolis Grand Prix. In the 200 m freestyle, Aresti challenged seven other swimmers on the third heat, including Olympic veteran Aleksandar Malenko of Yugoslavia. He edged out Chinese Taipei's Chen Te-tung to take a sixth spot and forty-fourth overall by 0.24 of a second in 1:53.90. In his second event, 100 m freestyle, Aresti placed thirty-eighth on the morning's preliminaries. Swimming in heat four, Aresti blasted a Cypriot record of 51.10 to save a second spot over Papua New Guinea's Ryan Pini by 0.01 of a second.
