= Dimitris Dimitriou (footballer) =

Cypriot footballer (born 1999)

Personal information
- Date of birth: 15 January 1999 (age 27)
- Place of birth: Nicosia, Cyprus
- Height: 1.93 m (6 ft 4 in)
- Position: Goalkeeper

Team information
- Current team: AEK Larnaca
- Number: 99

Youth career
- 2014–2016: Anorthosis

Senior career*
Years	Team	Apps	(Gls)
2016–2019	Anorthosis	20	(0)
2019–2025	Apollon Limassol	48	(0)
2025–	AEK Larnaca	0	(0)

International career^{‡}
2017	Cyprus U19		(0)
2018–	Cyprus U21	4	(0)
2020–	Cyprus	9	(0)
- * Club domestic league appearances and goals as of 11:05, 18 June 2025 (UTC) ‡ National team caps and goals as of 30 June 2024

Dimitris Dimitriou (Greek: Δημήτρης Δημητρίου; born 15 January 1999) is a Cypriot professional footballer who plays as a goalkeeper for AEK Larnaca.

== Club career ==
=== Anorthosis ===
Dimitriou made his debut for Anorthosis in 2018.

=== Apollon Limassol ===
In July 2019, Dimitriou joined Apollon Limassol.

== International career ==
Dimitriou made his national team debut on 13 October 2020 and kept a clean sheet in a draw against the Azerbaijan national football team.

== Career statistics ==
=== Club ===
As of 18 April 2024

Club	Season	League			Cup		Continental		Other		Total	
Club	Season	Division	Apps	Goals	Apps	Goals	Apps	Goals	Apps	Goals	Apps	Goals
Anorthosis	2018–19	Cypriot First Division	20	0	1	0	—		—		21	0
Apollon Limassol	2019–20	Cypriot First Division	3	0	2	0	0	0	—		5	0
Apollon Limassol	2020–21	Cypriot First Division	23	0	1	0	2	0	—		26	0
Apollon Limassol	2021–22	Cypriot First Division	5	0	1	0	0	0	—		6	0
Apollon Limassol	2022–23	Cypriot First Division	4	0	0	0	1	0	1	0	6	0
Apollon Limassol	2023–24	Cypriot First Division	7	0	1	0	—		—		8	0
Apollon Limassol	2024–25	Cypriot First Division	6	0	2	0	—		—		8	0
Apollon Limassol	2025–26	Cypriot First Division	0	0	0	0	—		—		0	0
Apollon Limassol	Total		48	0	7	0	3	0	1	0	59	0
Career total			68	0	8	0	3	0	1	0	80	0
