= Jonathan Winter =

New Zealand swimmer

Personal information
- Full name: Jonathan David Winter
- Nationality: New Zealand
- Born: 18 August 1971 (age 54) Masterton, Wellington
- Height: 1.86 m (6 ft 1 in)
- Weight: 85 kg (187 lb)

Sport
- Sport: Swimming
- Strokes: Backstroke
- Club: Head Coach at Ice Breaker Aquatics, Palmerston North, New Zealand
Medal record
World Championships (SC)
| Gold medal – first place | 1995 Rio de Janeiro | 4x100m Medley |

Jonathan Winter (born 18 August 1971 in Masterton) is a former backstroke swimmer from New Zealand, who competed at the 1996 Summer Olympics in Atlanta, United States. At the 1995 FINA World SC Championships in Rio de Janeiro, Brazil he won the gold medal with the men's 4 × 100 medley relay team.

Winter competed in three consecutive Commonwealth Games, starting in 1994. His first outing for the New Zealand team was in Spain at the first World Short Course Championships in 1993. Winter won four consecutive backstroke categories at the Oceania Grand Prix (1993, 94, 95 and 96) and represented his country in all strokes and individual medley. He held national records in butterfly, backstroke and individual medley. Winter retired in 1998 but made a comeback in 2002 at the Manchester Commonwealth Games, and placed 6th in 50 butterfly, and became the oldest male to win a national title in the 50 freestyle aged 31 years and seven months.

He began coaching the FRCC swimming club in Wellington in 1991 as junior coach to head coach Gary Hurring. Winter moved to Hastings in 1998 and formed Heretaunga Sundevils who became hugely successful during the early to mid 2000s. Winter then moved to Auckland and formed United Swimming Club another very successful organisation.

Winter is currently an associate coach at Kapiti's Swim Squad Otaki Titans Swimming Club (Based at Coastlands Aquatic Centre Paraparaumu) and Coastal Warriors on the Kāpiti Coast and was coach for the Tongan Olympic Swimming Team at London 2012.

Winter is the youngest grandson of Frank Winter, and is a member of the Ngāi Tahu tribe.
