= Todd Cooper =

British swimmer (born 1983)

Personal information
- Full name: Todd Alexander Cooper
- National team: Great Britain
- Born: 25 June 1983 (age 43) Kidderminster, England
- Height: 1.83 m (6 ft 0 in)
- Weight: 73 kg (161 lb; 11.5 st)

Sport
- Sport: Swimming
- Strokes: Freestyle, butterfly
- Club: University of Stirling
- Coach: Chris Martin
Medal record
Men's swimming
Representing Great Britain
European Championships (LC)
Bronze medal – third place	2006 Budapest	4×100 m medley
Summer Universiade
Silver medal – second place	2005 Izmir	100 m butterfly
Silver medal – second place	2005 Izmir	4×100 m freestyle
Representing Scotland
Commonwealth Games
Bronze medal – third place	2006 Melbourne	4×100 m medley

Todd Alexander Cooper (born 25 June 1983) is a former freestyle and butterfly swimmer who competed at the 2004 Summer Olympics in Athens, Greece. There he finished in 22nd position in the 100-metre butterfly. Cooper, a member of swimming club Stirling, twice competed for Scotland at the Commonwealth Games, in 2002 and 2006. Formerly coached by Gary Hollywood at the City of Birmingham Swimming Club from 1994 to 1998.

Cooper represented Great Britain at the 2008 Summer Olympics in the 100-metre butterfly swimming event.
