= Bahamas at the 2002 Commonwealth Games =

Sporting event delegation

Flag of Bahamas

The Bahamas were represented at the 2002 Commonwealth Games by Bahamas Olympic Association (BOA) and abbreviated BAH.

Bahamas first attended the Commonwealth Games back in 1954 in Vancouver, Canada, although this coral archipelago of around 700 islands did not join the Commonwealth until 1973.

Since its inaugural appearance this Caribbean country has only missed the Games of 1974 and 1986, winning the vast majority of its medals on the athletics track.

The Bahamas National Olympic Committee has been recognised by the IOC since 1952 and is the body responsible for the management of all Commonwealth Games matters in the Bahamas.

== Medals ==
	Gold	Silver	Bronze	Total
Bahamas	4	0	4	8

== See also ==
- Bahamas at the 2003 Pan American Games
