= Matthew Kidd =

British swimmer

Medal record

Men's swimming

Representing Great Britain

European Championships (SC)
| Bronze medal – third place | 2000 Valencia | 4×50 m freestyle |

Summer Universiade
| Gold medal – first place | 2003 Daegu | 4×100 m freestyle |

Matthew Kidd (born 27 October 1979) is a freestyle swimmer from Great Britain.

== Swimming career ==
Matthew competed in the 100 metre freestyle at the 2004 Summer Olympics in Athens, Greece, finishing 23rd fastest overall. He combined with the British squad to place 8th in the 4×100 metre medley relay final in a time of 3 minutes 37.77 seconds. His anchor split was 49.14 seconds, marginally slower than his preliminary split time of 49.05 seconds.

He won the 2002 and 2004 British Championship in 100 metres freestyle.

== See also ==
- List of Commonwealth Games medallists in swimming (men)
