= Chrysanthos Papachrysanthou =

Cypriot swimmer (born 1979)

Personal information
- Full name: Chrysanthos Papachrysanthou
- National team: Cyprus
- Born: 7 February 1979 (age 47) Nicosia, Cyprus
- Height: 1.84 m (6 ft 0 in)
- Weight: 79 kg (174 lb)

Sport
- Sport: Swimming
- Strokes: Freestyle
- College team: Southern Illinois University (U.S.)
- Coach: Rick Walker (U.S.)
Medal record
Men's swimming
Representing Cyprus
Mediterranean Games
Silver medal – second place	2001 Tunis	50 m freestyle

Chrysanthos Papachrysanthou (Greek: Χρύσανθος Παπαχρυσάνθου; born 7 February 1979) is a Cypriot former swimmer, who specialized in sprint freestyle events. He is a four-time All-Academic honoree (1999, 2000, 2001, and 2002), and an eight-time All-Conference champion in freestyle swimming (50 and 100 m). In 2002, Papachrysanthou was named Dr. Charlotte West Scholar-Athlete Award Recipient for his full commitment and dedication towards academic and athletic excellence, service, and leadership.

As a member of the Cyprus team, Papachrysanthou made his official debut at the 2000 Summer Olympics in Sydney, where he competed in the men's 100 m freestyle. He rounded out the fifth heat to last place and fifty-seventh overall by 0.04 of a second behind Ecuador's Felipe Delgado in 52.82. By the following year, Papachrysanthou shared silver medals with France's Julien Sicot in the 50 m freestyle at the 2001 Mediterranean Games in Tunis, Tunisia in 23.06 seconds.

At the 2004 Summer Olympics in Athens, Papachrysanthou qualified for the men's 50 m freestyle by eclipsing a FINA B-standard entry time of 23.04. He challenged seven other swimmers on the sixth heat, including three-time Olympian Julio Santos of Ecuador. He edged out Thailand's Arwut Chinnapasaen to take a fifth spot by a hundredth of a second (0.01), outside his entry time of 23.51. Papachrysanthou failed to advance into the semifinals, as he placed forty-fifth out of 86 swimmers in the preliminaries.

Papachrysanthou is a member of the swimming team for Southern Illinois Salukis, and a graduate of physical education at Southern Illinois University in Carbondale, Illinois.
