= Mark Foster (swimmer) =

British swimmer

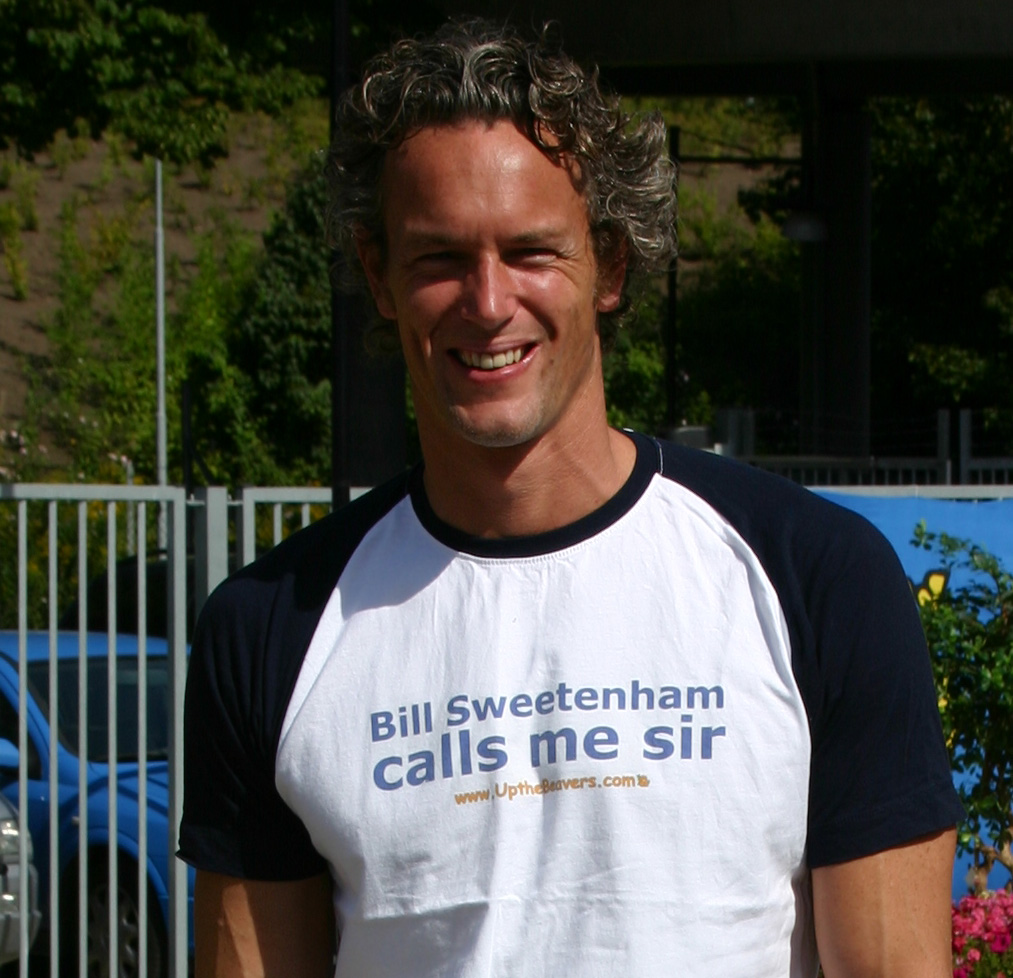
- Foster in 2005

Personal information
- Full name: Mark Andrew Foster
- National team: Great Britain and Northern Ireland
- Born: 12 May 1970 (age 56) Billericay, England
- Height: 1.98 m (6 ft 6 in)
- Weight: 90 kg (198 lb; 14 st 2 lb)

Sport
- Sport: Swimming
- Strokes: Freestyle, Butterfly
- Club: University of Bath SC
Medal record
Men's swimming
Representing Great Britain
Event	1st	2nd	3rd
World Championships (LC)	0	1	1
World Championships (SC)	6	4	3
European Championships (LC)	0	1	3
European Championships (SC)	11	6	7
Commonwealth Games	2	1	5
Total	19	13	19
World Championships (LC)
Silver medal – second place	2003 Barcelona	50 m freestyle
Bronze medal – third place	2001 Fukuoka	50 m butterfly
World Championships (SC)
Gold medal – first place	1993 Palma	50 m freestyle
Gold medal – first place	1999 Hong Kong	50 m freestyle
Gold medal – first place	1999 Hong Kong	50 m butterfly
Gold medal – first place	2000 Athens	50 m freestyle
Gold medal – first place	2000 Athens	50 m butterfly
Gold medal – first place	2004 Indianapolis	50 m freestyle
Silver medal – second place	1997 Gothenburg	50 m freestyle
Silver medal – second place	2002 Moscow	50 m freestyle
Silver medal – second place	2004 Indianapolis	50 m butterfly
Silver medal – second place	2008 Manchester	50 m freestyle
Bronze medal – third place	1993 Palma	4×100 m medley
Bronze medal – third place	1997 Gothenburg	4×100 m medley
Bronze medal – third place	2002 Moscow	50 m butterfly
European Championships (LC)
Silver medal – second place	1997 Seville	50 m freestyle
Bronze medal – third place	1993 Sheffield	4×100 m medley
Bronze medal – third place	1999 Istanbul	50 m butterfly
Bronze medal – third place	2000 Helsinki	50 m butterfly
European Championships (SC)
Gold medal – first place	1992 Espoo	50 m butterfly
Gold medal – first place	1996 Rostock	50 m freestyle
Gold medal – first place	1996 Rostock	50 m butterfly
Gold medal – first place	1998 Sheffield	50 m freestyle
Gold medal – first place	1999 Lisbon	50 m freestyle
Gold medal – first place	2000 Valencia	50 m butterfly
Gold medal – first place	2003 Dublin	50 m freestyle
Gold medal – first place	2003 Dublin	50 m butterfly
Gold medal – first place	2004 Vienna	50 m freestyle
Gold medal – first place	2004 Vienna	50 m butterfly
Gold medal – first place	2005 Trieste	50 m freestyle
Silver medal – second place	1998 Sheffield	50 m butterfly
Silver medal – second place	1998 Sheffield	4×50 m freestyle
Silver medal – second place	2000 Valencia	50 m freestyle
Silver medal – second place	2001 Antwerp	50 m butterfly
Silver medal – second place	2001 Antwerp	4×50 m medley
Silver medal – second place	2005 Trieste	50 m butterfly
Bronze medal – third place	1992 Espoo	50 m freestyle
Bronze medal – third place	1996 Rostock	4×50 m medley
Bronze medal – third place	1998 Sheffield	4×50 m medley
Bronze medal – third place	1999 Lisbon	4×50 m medley
Bronze medal – third place	2000 Valencia	4×50 m freestyle
Bronze medal – third place	2005 Trieste	4×50 m medley
Bronze medal – third place	2005 Trieste	4×50 m freestyle
Representing England
Commonwealth Games
Gold medal – first place	1994 Victoria	50 m freestyle
Gold medal – first place	1998 Kuala Lumpur	50 m freestyle
Silver medal – second place	1990 Auckland	4×100 m freestyle
Bronze medal – third place	1986 Edinburgh	4×100 m freestyle
Bronze medal – third place	1990 Auckland	50 m freestyle
Bronze medal – third place	1994 Victoria	4×100 m freestyle
Bronze medal – third place	2002 Manchester	50 m freestyle
Bronze medal – third place	2002 Manchester	50 m butterfly

Mark Andrew Foster (born 12 May 1970) is an English former competitive swimmer who represented Great Britain in the Olympics and world championships, and swam for England in the Commonwealth Games. Foster is a former world champion and won multiple medals in international competition during his long career. He competed primarily in butterfly and freestyle at 50 metres.

Foster is a specialist short-course (25 metre pool) swimmer. In terms of medals and longevity (1986–2008), he is amongst the most successful British swimmers of all time. He was the fastest swimmer in the country by age 15. He made a comeback at the national championships in July 2007 winning both events he competed in after barely training. He achieved the fifth best time in 2007 in the world at 50 metres freestyle and retired for the second time after the 2008 Olympics. He has six World Championship titles, two Commonwealth titles and eleven European titles to his name.

== Early career ==
Foster was born in Billericay, Essex, and was first taught by Ann Hardcastle, the mother of Sarah Hardcastle, at a pool in Southend-on-Sea. He was the fastest swimmer in the country by age 15.

Foster was educated at Alleyn Court Preparatory School in Westcliff on Sea, Millfield School, Kelly College and Southend High School for Boys where he excelled in athletics, football and tennis..

== National Championships ==
Foster dominated the short distances in the National Championships winning the 50 metres freestyle title 14 times from 1986 until 2004 and the 50 metres butterfly title ten times from 1992 until 2002.

== International career ==
First selected for the British team in 1985, Foster's breakthrough came in 1990 when he won his first individual international medal - bronze - in the Commonwealth Games in Auckland. He finished the 50 metres freestyle with a time of 23.16 seconds. He had previously won bronze as part of the 100 metre freestyle relay in the Edinburgh games four years previous, but cites the 1990 medal as his first great sporting moment.

Success followed rapidly and in the next few years, Foster broke the World Short Course freestyle record four times, the World Short Course butterfly record twice, and set the World Long Course butterfly record (in 1996) with a time of 24.07 seconds.

Foster trained at The Race Club, a Florida swim camp founded by Olympic Swimmers Gary Hall, Jr. and his father, Gary Hall, Sr. The Race Club, originally known as "The World Team," was designed to serve as a training group for elite swimmers across the world in preparation for the 2000 Sydney Olympic Games. To be able to train with the Race Club, one must either have been ranked in the top 20 in the world the past 3 calendar years or top 3 in their nation in the past year. The Race Club included such well known swimmers as Foster, Roland Mark Schoeman, Ryk Neethling, and Therese Alshammar.

Despite success at Commonwealth, European and World championship level mostly at short courses, Olympic titles eluded him and he has never won a medal.

In 2004, Foster faced the disappointment of not being selected for the Olympic Games. At the British Olympic Trials, he won the 50 free in 22.49 seconds, well under the Olympic qualifying standard but seven hundredths of a second below the standard National Team Director Bill Sweetenham had set for inclusion in the British Olympic Team. Foster has openly criticised Sweetenham's management style and Sweetenham ensured that he was not selected.

Nonetheless, Foster responded to his omission from the Olympic squad with a gold medal in the World Short Course Championships in Indianapolis later that year. In the 50 metre freestyle, he achieved 21.58 seconds, ahead of Stefan Nystrand of Sweden. Although Foster announced his retirement from swimming after the European short course championships in April 2006 at the age of 35, he still occasionally competed that year at invitational meets.

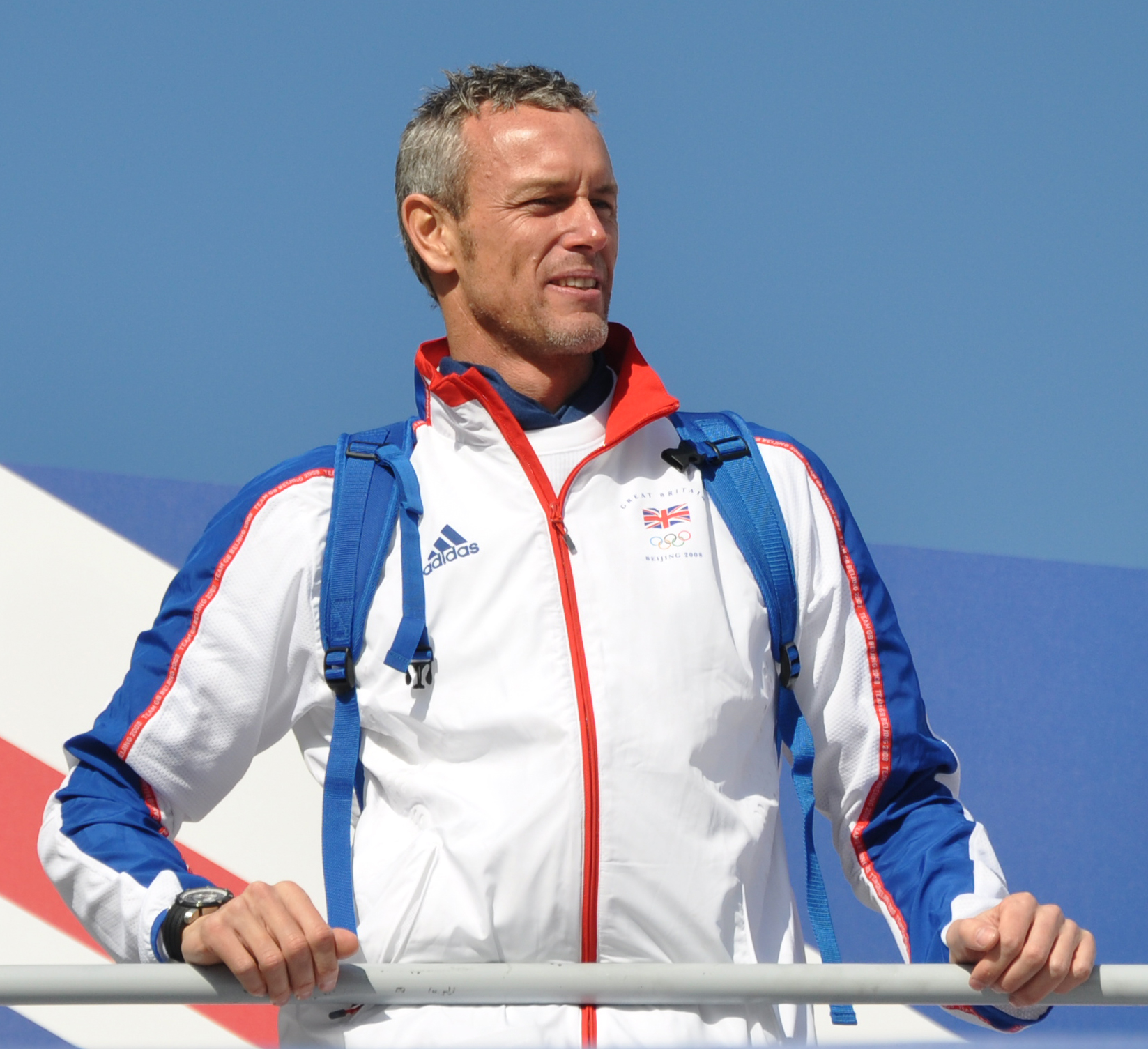
Foster at the parade in London to celebrate the achievements of British competitors at the 2008 Summer Olympics.

Foster returned from "retirement" in 2007 with an aim to win an Olympic medal at the 2008 Olympic Games. Returning to the British squad he won a silver medal in the 50 m freestyle at the 2008 FINA Short Course World Championships, and qualified to represent Great Britain at the same distance in the Olympics. At the opening ceremony on 8 August, he carried the flag for Great Britain during the Parade of Nations. He failed to qualify for the men's 50 m freestyle semi-finals, finishing almost two-tenths of a second outside the top 16.

== Charity work ==
In May 2009, Foster became patron of The Anaphylaxis Campaign, the UK charity for people with severe allergies. He won £10,000 for the campaign by participating in Who Wants to Be a Millionaire?, broadcast on ITV on 8 September 2009. In 1999, Foster's friend, Scottish athlete Ross Baillie died from anaphylaxis shortly after the pair had gone out for lunch.

In October 2008, Foster was a celebrity judge for the Miele Fashion Prize, in aid of children's medical charity, Sparks.

In June 2009, Foster supported ActionAid's PoverTee Day by having a T-shirt painted on his torso.

Foster is also an ambassador for the UK charity SportsAid, which supported him in the early days of his career, helping talented young sports people to achieve their ambitions.

== Awards ==
In 2016, Foster became an Honorary Doctor of Health Sciences at Anglia Ruskin University.

== Media appearances ==
In the year 2000, he made a guest appearance on the first series of Techno Games.

On 4 April 2008, Foster appeared on the ITV show Beat the Star in which he won 18–3, appearing as the 'star'. On 20 May 2008, he appeared as a guest home owner on the BBC Two show Through the Keyhole.

In the Summer of 2008, he appeared on the new series of Superstars on Channel 5.

In December 2008, Foster appeared on a Strictly Come Dancing special of The Weakest Link in December 2008, beating Anton du Beke in the final round. He had previously appeared on an Olympic special, but did not win.

On 12 February 2009, Foster co-presented BBC Look East's 6.30 pm bulletin, with Susie Fowler-Watt.

Foster was a contestant on the BBC One programme Let's Dance for Sport Relief as a member of the dance group 'The Olympians'.

Foster regularly appears on BBC TV regional news and local radio in his role of Ambassador of Pools 4 Schools, a programme run by Total Swimming with the Amateur Swimming Association to increase participation in swimming amongst primary school children.

Foster appears in advertisements for Wellman nutritional products.

On 23 March 2012, Foster made a guest appearance on ITV2's Celebrity Juice.

On 27 July 2012, Foster appeared on a Paralympic special of the Channel 4 game show The Million Pound Drop with Countdown presenter Rachel Riley.

Foster often appears as an analyst for BBC Sport's coverage of Swim meets. This includes four Commonwealth Games: Delhi 2010, Glasgow 2014, Gold Coast 2018 and Birmingham 2022, and four Summer Olympic Games: London 2012, Rio 2016, Tokyo 2020 and Paris 2024.

In November 2023, Foster participated in Series 7, Week 8 of Richard Osman's House of Games.

== Strictly Come Dancing ==
Foster competed in the sixth series of Strictly Come Dancing with professional dancer Hayley Holt. He was voted off by the judges in the dance-off on week 6. He participated in the Strictly Come Dancing arena tour in 2012, dancing with Natalie Lowe.

Week #	Dance/Song	Judges' score					Result
Week #	Dance/Song	Horwood	Phillips	Goodman	Tonioli	Total	Result
1	Waltz / Tennessee Waltz	3	6	7	6	22	Safe
3	Tango / Tanguera	5	5	7	7	24	Bottom Two/Saved
5	Samba / Spice Up Your Life	3	4	5	5	17	Safe
6	Paso Doble / Since U Been Gone	2	4	5	5	16	Bottom Two/Eliminated

== Personal bests and records held ==
Long course (50 m)

Event	Time	Date	Meet	Location	Ref
50 m freestyle	21.96	21 Jun 2008	Golden Bear	Zagreb, Croatia	
100 m freestyle	51.67	18 Aug 1994	Commonwealth Games	Victoria, British Columbia, Canada	
50 m butterfly	23.51	8 June 2003	Golden Bear	Zagreb, Croatia	

Short course (25 m)

Event	Time		Date	Meet	Location	Ref
50 m freestyle	21.13	NR	28 Jan 2001	World Cup	Paris, France	
100 m freestyle	49.65		2 Dec 1993	World SC Championships	Palma de Mallorca, Spain	
50 m butterfly	22:87	NR	17 Jan 2001	World Cup	Sheffield, United Kingdom	

Legend: WR – World record; ER – European record; CR – Commonwealth record; NR – British record;
Records not set in finals: h – heat; sf – semifinal; r – relay 1st leg; rh – relay heat 1st leg; b – B final; † – en route to final mark; so – swim-off; tt – time trial

== Personal life ==
In 2002 Foster lived in Bath, UK, sharing a flat with former 110m hurdles Olympic silver medallist and World champion athlete Colin Jackson.

In November 2017, Foster came out as gay.

== See also ==
- 2008 Summer Olympics national flag bearers
- List of Commonwealth Games medallists in swimming (men)
- List of LGBT Olympians
- World record progression 50 metres butterfly
- World record progression 50 metres freestyle

Records
Preceded by Steve Crocker; Alexander Popov; Anthony Ervin	Men's 50 metre freestyle world record holder (short course); 17 February 1993 – 13 March 1994; 13 December 1998 - 23 March 2000; 28 January 2001 - 25 March 2004	Succeeded by Alexander Popov; Roland Schoeman; Frédérick Bousquet
Olympic Games
Preceded by Kate Howey	Flagbearer for Great Britain; Beijing 2008	Succeeded by Chris Hoy
