= Roland Schoeman =

South African American swimmer

Roland Schoeman OLY
Personal information
- Full name: Roland Mark Schoeman
- Nationality: South Africa; United States
- Born: 3 July 1980 (age 45) Pretoria, South Africa
- Height: 1.90 m (6 ft 3 in)
- Weight: 84 kg (185 lb; 13.2 st)

Sport
- Sport: Swimming
- Strokes: Freestyle, butterfly
- Club: Phoenix Swim Club (USA)
- College team: University of Arizona '02
- Coach: Jonty Skinner; Frank Busch, Rick DeMont (U. of Arizona)
Medal record
Men's swimming
Representing South Africa
Olympic Games
Gold medal – first place	2004 Athens	4×100 m freestyle
Silver medal – second place	2004 Athens	100 m freestyle
Bronze medal – third place	2004 Athens	50 m freestyle
World Championships (LC)
Gold medal – first place	2005 Montreal	50 m freestyle
Gold medal – first place	2005 Montreal	50 m butterfly
Gold medal – first place	2007 Melbourne	50 m butterfly
Silver medal – second place	2005 Montreal	100 m freestyle
Bronze medal – third place	2001 Fukuoka	50 m freestyle
Pan Pacific Championships
Silver medal – second place	2006 Victoria	50 m freestyle
Bronze medal – third place	2006 Victoria	100 m freestyle
Bronze medal – third place	2010 Irvine	50 m butterfly
Bronze medal – third place	2010 Irvine	4×100 m freestyle
Commonwealth Games
Gold medal – first place	2002 Manchester	50 m freestyle
Gold medal – first place	2006 Melbourne	50 m freestyle
Gold medal – first place	2006 Melbourne	50 m butterfly
Gold medal – first place	2006 Melbourne	4×100 m freestyle
Silver medal – second place	2002 Manchester	50 m butterfly
Silver medal – second place	2002 Manchester	4×100 m freestyle
Silver medal – second place	2010 Delhi	50 m freestyle
Silver medal – second place	2014 Glasgow	50 m butterfly
Silver medal – second place	2014 Glasgow	4×100 m freestyle
Bronze medal – third place	2006 Melbourne	100 m freestyle
Bronze medal – third place	2010 Delhi	50 m butterfly
Bronze medal – third place	2010 Delhi	4×100 m freestyle

Roland Mark Schoeman OIS (born 3 July 1980) is a South African and American former swimmer was a world record holder in multiple events, and was a member of the South African swimming team at the 2000, 2004, 2008 and 2012 Olympic Games. He won a gold medal representing South Africa in the 4x100 freestyle relay at the 2004 Athens Olympics and between 2000-2014 won numerous medals including seven golds in freestyle, and butterfly events at the World Championships, Pan American, and Commonwealth games.

== Early life and overview ==
Born in Pretoria on July 3, 1980, Schoeman first took an interest in the sport when he was 13, and began to compete three years later. He said he began swimming only to impress a girl he met. He attended Pretoria's Willow Ridge High School, where he trained under coach Gavin Ross. In 1998, shortly before beginning college at the University of Arizona, he finished sixth in the 50 and 100 meter freestyles at the Commonwealth Games in Kuala Lumpur. In his career he would attain a gold, silver and bronze medal at the 2004 Olympic Games; three gold, a silver and a bronze medal in the World Championships, as well as four gold, three silvers and three bronzes at the Commonwealth Games. He set new South African records in the 100 m Freestyle (48.69 s), 50 m Freestyle (22.04 s), 100 m Butterfly (52.73 s) and 50 m Butterfly (23.65 s) events.

=== University of Arizona ===
Schoeman attended the University of Arizona on a swimming scholarship between 1998-2002, where he was coached by ASCAA Hall of Fame Coach Frank Busch and Assistant Coach Rick DeMont. Coach DeMont also served as a primary coach for Schoeman's South African Team at the 2004 Athens and 2008 Beijing Olympics. As a collegiate swimmer at the University of Arizona, DeMont had held world records in both the 400-meter and 1500-meter freestyle, and excelled at middle and long distance freestyle events, making him a skilled mentor for advancing Schoeman's freestyle technique.

In 2000, at the NCAA Men's Swimming and Diving Championships in Minnesota, while swimming as a Sophomore, Schoeman tied the short course world record in the 50-meter freestyle with a time of 21.31. While at Arizona in 2002, he again won the NCAA Championship in the 50-meter freestyle, in addition to capturing several runner-up finishes and multiple All-American honors. Roland would later became the first person ever to record a time of less than 21 seconds in the 50 meter freestyle.

== Career ==
Schoeman competed for South Africa in the 2000 Sydney Olympics in the 50-meter freestyle placing eleventh and the 100 meter freestyle event placing fifteenth, as well as the 4x100 meter freestyle relay where his team placed eleventh.

=== Three 2004 Olympic medals ===
Schoeman won three medals at the 2004 Olympics, making him the first South African to win three medals in one Olympics. He won a gold medal in the 4 × 100 m freestyle. He captured the silver medal in the 100 m freestyle event recording a time of 48.23. Schoeman and South African teammate Neethling led in the first half of the 100 meter event, but Pieter Van Den Hoogenband of the Netherlands had a strong finish to defend his title and take the gold medal. Schoeman won a bronze in the 50 m freestyle with a time of 22.02 in a typically close finish. Though leading in the early portion of the 50-meter event, Schoeman faded to third place, finishing only .08 seconds behind the unexpected second place silver medalist, Duje Draganja of Croatia.

In his most memorable event at the 2004 games, Schoeman helped South Africa upset the Netherlands and the dominant United States in the 4x100 meter freestyle relay, an historic upset. The 2004 4x100 meter Olympic gold medal South African relay team consisted of Schoeman, Lyndon Ferns, Darian Townsend, and Ryk Neethling. As one of the events faster swimmers, Schoeman's opening leg in the 4x100 freestyle relay opened up a lead that remained throughout the race defeating the second place Netherlands teams by a second and defeating the United States team which took the bronze. Ryk Neethling swam the fastest time of the South African 4x100 relay team in the final heat and insured the South African win, despite a close finish.

At the 2008 Beijing Olympics, Schoeman participated in the 50-meter freestyle and the 4x100 meter freestyle relay finishing seventh in both events.

At the 2012 Summer Olympics in London, Schoeman, aged 32, advanced to the finals in the men's 50 m freestyle though he finished sixth, clocking a 21.80 in the finals to finish 0.46 seconds behind the gold medal winner, Florent Manaudou.

In 2016, Schoeman missed qualifying for a fifth Olympics.

=== 2006 Commonwealth games ===
Three of the Men's 4x100 metre Freestyle team at the 2004 Olympics were in the team that broke the record and won gold at the 2006 Commonwealth Games. He also claimed golds at the 2006 Commonwealth Games in the 100m freestyle and 100m butterfly.

=== 2001, 2005, 2007 World Aquatic Championships ===
Schoeman won a bronze in the 50 meter freestyle at the 2001 World Aquatics Championships.

At the 2005 FINA World Aquatics Championships in Montreal, Quebec, Canada he won two gold medals [50 m Butterfly (in a world record time of 22.96 s) and Freestyle (21.69 s, the second fastest time in history at the time). He also claimed a silver in 100 m freestyle.

At the 2007 FINA World Aquatics Championships in Melbourne Australia he successfully defended his 50m butterfly title. He also made the final of the 50 m and 100 m freestyle and was part of the 4 × 100 m freestyle relay team that finished fourth.

In December 2005, he turned down a 40 Million Rand (US$5.9 million) contract to swim for Qatar. He turned down the offer due to his own national pride and because he felt the sound of the South African national anthem and the experience of sharing pride in his victories with other citizens of South Africans is what made winning gold special.

After his elite swimming career ended, he competed in the 1 Mile Flowers Sea Swim at the Cayman Islands in June 2018, finishing with a time of 24:05.

In July 2019, Schoeman received a provisional suspension after testing positive for GW501516 (Cardarine) in an out-of-competition test on May 18, 2019. FINA (now World Aquatics) initially imposed a one-year ban set to end in May 2020, accepting the claim of unintentional ingestion from a contaminated supplement. However, the World Anti-Doping Agency (WADA) appealed FINA's decision to the Court of Arbitration for Sport (CAS). After a lengthy process, it was publicly reported in September 2022 that CAS had ruled the ban should be increased to two years, effectively extending his ineligibility until May 2021.

== Life after swimming career ==
Following his swimming career in May 2022, he also became a citizen of the United States.

Roland has been a licensed realtor in Arizona since 2021.

In 2023 he was part of the Enhanced Games athletes advisory commission.

== Records ==
Schoeman was the former individual world record holder in the Long Course Meters 50 butterfly, Short Course Meters 50 freestyle, Short Course Meters 100 freestyle, and Short Course Meters 100 individual medley. On 6 September 2008, Schoeman set a new short course meters (25 m pool) world record of 20.64 for a 50-meter swim at South African Nationals. He lost his world record in late 2008 but regained it in August 2009. At the South Africa Short Course Championships, Schoeman recorded a time of 20.30 seconds for the 50-meter event, which was broken in 2014 by Florent Manaudou. Overall, Schoeman has broken three long course world records with two individual, and one relay, and six individual short course world records.

Event	Time	Record	Date	Location
Long course
50m Freestyle	21.67	SA Record Holder	16 Aug 2008	Beijing, China
50m Freestyle	21.67 =	SA Record Holder	2 Aug 2013	Barcelona, Spain
100m Freestyle	48.17	Former SA Record Holder	15 Aug 2004	Athens, Greece
50m Butterfly	22.90	Former WR Holder	26 Jul 2009	Rome, Italy
4 × 100 m Freestyle	3:11.93	Former WR Holder	26 Jul 2009	Rome, Italy
Short course
50m Freestyle	20.30	Former WR Holder	8 August 2009	Pietermaritzburg, South Africa
100m Freestyle	46.25	Former WR Holder	22 January 2005	Berlin, Germany
50m Butterfly	21.87		14 Nov 2009	Berlin, Germany
100m IM	52.20	Former WR Holder	13 Aug 2006	Hamburg, Germany

== Honors ==
Schoeman, who is asthmatic, was voted the African Swimmer of the Year by Swimming World in 2004, 2005 and 2006; and the South African Swimmer of the Year in 2003, 2004, 2005 and 2006. He was elected South African Sports Star of the Year in 2004.

In 2007, he received the South African Presidential Award Order of Ikhamanga in Silver, awarded for excellent achievements in the field of swimming.

In 2004 he was inducted into the University of Pretoria Sport Hall of fame.

In 2007 he was inducted into the University of Arizona Sports Hall of Fame.

In August, 2024, he was inducted into the South Africa Sports Hall of Fame, along with the three other swimmers who won the gold medal in the 4x100 meter freestyle relay at the 2004 Athens Olympics.

== See also ==
- List of Commonwealth Games medallists in swimming (men)
- List of Olympic medalists in swimming (men)
- World record progression 50 metres freestyle
- World record progression 100 metres freestyle
- World record progression 50 metres butterfly
- World record progression 100 metres individual medley

Records
Preceded by Mark Foster	Men's 50-metre freestyle world record-holder (short course); 23 March 2000 – 23 March 2000; Shared with Mark Foster	Succeeded by Anthony Ervin
Preceded by Australia; Michael Klim, Chris Fydler, Ashley Callus and Ian Thorpe	Men's 4 × 100 metres freestyle relay world record-holder (long course); 15 August 2004 – 19 August 2006 with Lyndon Ferns, Darian Townsend and Ryk Neethling	Succeeded by USA; Michael Phelps, Neil Walker, Cullen Jones and Jason Lezak
Preceded by Thomas Rupprath	Men's 100-metre individual medley world record-holder (short course); 18 January 2005 – 22 January 2005	Succeeded by Ryk Neethling
Preceded by Ian Crocker	Men's 100-metre freestyle world record-holder (short course); 22 January 2005 – 17 December 2007	Succeeded by Stefan Nystrand
Preceded by Ian Crocker	Men's 50-metre butterfly world record-holder (long course); 24 July 2005 – 5 April 2009	Succeeded by Rafael Muñoz
Preceded by Frédérick Bousquet	Men's 50-metre freestyle world record-holder (short course); 12 August 2006 – 18 November 2007	Succeeded by Stefan Nystrand
Preceded by Duje Draganja	Men's 50-metre freestyle world record-holder (short course); 7 September 2008 – 11 December 2008	Succeeded by Amaury Leveaux
Preceded by Amaury Leveaux	Men's 50-metre freestyle world record-holder (short course); 8 August 2009 – 5 December 2014	Succeeded by Florent Manaudou
Awards
Preceded by Not available	World African Swimmer of the Year; 2004 – 2007	Succeeded by Ous Mellouli
