= Musa Bakare =

Nigerian swimmer

Personal information
- Born: 24 June 1971 (age 55)

Sport
- Sport: Swimming
Medal record
Representing Nigeria
African Games
Silver medal – second place	1991 Cairo	100m butterfly
Bronze medal – third place	1991 Cairo	50m freestyle

Musa Bakare (born 24 June 1971) is a Nigerian swimmer. He competed in two events at the 1992 Summer Olympics.
