= Chris Vythoulkas =

Bahamian swimmer (born 1984)

Personal information
- Full name: Christopher Vythoulkas
- Nationality: Bahamian
- Born: 15 February 1984 (age 42)

Sport
- Sport: Swimming
- Strokes: Backstroke; Butterfly; Freestyle
- College team: Florida State University
- Coach: Duffy Dillon

Christopher Vythoulkas (born 15 February 1984) is a Bahamian former multi-discipline professional swimmer. He represented his country at the 2004 Summer Olympics in the 100 metre backstroke and qualifying in the 100 metre butterfly.

Major championships which he represented the Bahamas:

- 1999 Pan Am Games
- 2001 US Open (Medalist)
- 2002 Commonwealth Games
- 2003 US Open
- 2003 Pan Am Games
- 2004 Olympics
- 2005 World Championships
- 2006 Commonwealth Games
- 2007 World Championships
- 2007 Pan Am Games
- Highest World Ranking: 10th
- Highest Commonwealth Ranking: 4th
- Christopher holds numerous Bahamian and Caribbean records.

At the 2006 Commonwealth Games he swam in four events. He finished 25th in 50 metres freestyle, 13th in 50 metres backstroke, 19th in 100 metres backstroke and 15th in 50 metres butterfly
