= Isle of Man at the Commonwealth Games =

- Flag of the Isle of Man
- CG code: IOM
- CGA: Commonwealth Games Association of the Isle of Man
- Website: cga.im
- Medals Ranked 35th: Gold 4 Silver 3 Bronze 7 Total 14

Commonwealth Games appearances (overview)
- 1958; 1962; 1966; 1970; 1974; 1978; 1982; 1986; 1990; 1994; 1998; 2002; 2006; 2010; 2014; 2018; 2022; 2026; 2030

The Isle of Man has competed eighteen times in the Commonwealth Games to date, beginning in 1958.

== History ==
The Isle of Man first participated at the Games in 1958 in Cardiff, Wales. The Isle of Man has been strongest in Cycling and Shooting events.

== Medals ==
The Isle of Man was thirty-forth on the all-time medal tally of the Commonwealth Games after the 2026 games in Glasgow, Scotland having won fourteen medals since 1958.

Games	Gold	Silver	Bronze	Total	Rank
(Wales) 1958 Cardiff	0	0	1	1	22
(Australia) 1962 Perth	0	0	0	0	—N/a
(Jamaica) 1966 Kingston	1	0	0	1	15
(Scotland) 1970 Edinburgh	0	0	1	1	22
(New Zealand) 1974 Christchurch	0	0	0	0	—N/a
(Canada) 1978 Edmonton	0	0	1	1	21
(Australia) 1982 Brisbane	0	0	0	0	—N/a
(Scotland) 1986 Edinburgh	1	0	0	1	8
(New Zealand) 1990 Auckland	0	0	0	0	—N/a
(Canada) 1994 Victoria	0	0	0	0	—N/a
(Malaysia) 1998 Kuala Lumpur	0	1	0	1	28
(England) 2002 Manchester	0	0	0	0	—N/a
(Australia) 2006 Melbourne	1	0	1	2	19
(India) 2010 Delhi	0	0	2	2	31
(Scotland) 2014 Glasgow	0	1	0	1	29
(Australia) 2018 Gold Coast	0	1	0	1	34
(England) 2022 Birmingham	0	0	0	0	—N/a
(Scotland) 2026 Glasgow	1	0	1	2	20
Total	4	3	7	14	33

=== Individual Medal Winners ===
- Stuart Slack – Cycling Road Race – Bronze – Cardiff 1958
- Peter Buckley – Cycling Road Race – Gold – Jamaica 1966
- Alex Jackson – Swimming 200m Freestyle – Bronze – Edinburgh 1970
- Stewart Watterson – Shooting 50m Rifle Prone – Bronze – Edmonton 1978
- Nigel Kelly – Shooting Individual Skeet – Gold – Edinburgh 1986
- David Moore – Shooting 50m Rifle Prone – Silver – Kuala Lumpur 1998
- Mark Cavendish – Cycling Scratch Race – Gold – Melbourne 2006
- Trevor Boyles and David Walton – Shooting Trap Pairs – Bronze – Melbourne 2006
- Mark Christian – Cycling Scratch Race – Bronze – Delhi 2010
- Tim Kneale – Shooting Double Trap – Bronze – Delhi 2010
- Peter Kennaugh – Cycling Points Race – Silver – Glasgow 2014
- Tim Kneale – Shooting Double Trap – Silver – Gold Coast 2018
- David Mullarkey – Athletics 10,000m – Bronze – Glasgow 2026
- Matthew Bostock – Cycling Points Race – Gold – Glasgow 2026
