= Manchester Aquatics Centre =

Public aquatic sports facility in Manchester, England

Coordinates: 53°28′10″N 2°14′08″W

- MAC
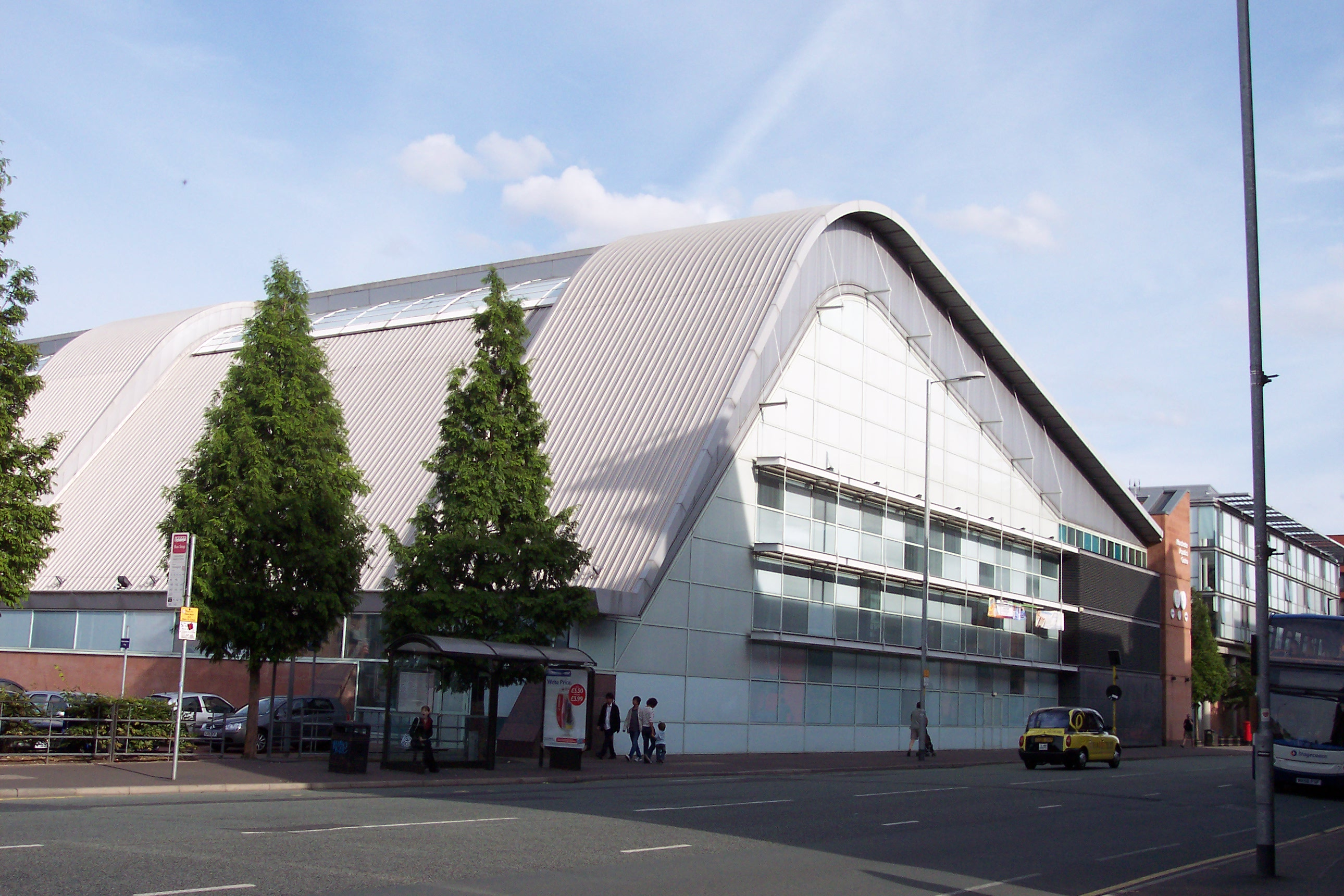
- Interactive map of Manchester Aquatics Centre
- Full name: Manchester Aquatics Centre
- Address: Manchester, England
- Capacity: approx. 1,000

Construction
- Built: 1996–2000
- Opened: 12 October 2000; 26 years ago
- Architect: FaulknerBrowns Architects

Tenants
- City of Manchester Aquatics Swim Team; City of Manchester Water Polo Club; University of Manchester Swimming Club; University of Manchester Canoe Club; Manchester Aquatics Centre (MAC) Dive Team

The Manchester Aquatics Centre, abbreviated MAC, is a public aquatics sports facility south of the city centre of Manchester, England, north of the main buildings of the University of Manchester near Manchester Metropolitan University. It was purpose built for the 2002 Commonwealth Games, and cost £32 million to build.

Before it was built, for many years its site was open waste ground, left by demolishing inner city industrial terrace houses. The building was designed by FaulknerBrowns Architects. The building takes the approximate shape of an asymmetric trapezoidal prism (the apex provides clearance above the highest diving board), and from the outside, the roof resembles a wave.

Construction started in August 1996, and was completed in July 2000, with finishing touches made in September 2001. MAC hosts many swimming and water polo events but also hosts Lancashire County Championships and Age group North west Regionals for swimming. It was opened on 12 October 2000, by Queen Elizabeth II. The pool was closed in 2021 for major refurbishment works over the following two years.

== Facilities ==
The centre's facilities include:

- Two 50 m (160 ft) swimming pools, each able to be split into sections of varying dimensions and depths with the help of moveable floors and booms. In fact, the centre has the world's largest area of movable floors and booms in a swimming facility.
  - The "main pool" on the ground floor is 50 m (160 ft) by 20 m (66 ft) with a maximum depth of 2 m (6 ft 7 in). A sinkable boom can separate the pool into a 23 m (75 ft) by 21 m (69 ft) with constant depth between floor level and 2 m (6 ft 7 in) depth; and a 25 m (82 ft) by 21 m (69 ft) section at 2 m (6 ft 7 in) depth, which in turn can be separated by another sinkable boom to allow a section of 10 m (33 ft) by 21 m (69 ft). The floors of these three sections can each be independently raised or lowered between very shallow and 2 m (6 ft 7 in) depth. 1,000 permanent spectator seats overlook the main pool hall.
  - The "training pool" is located in the basement and is 16 m (52 ft) by 50 m (160 ft) in size, with a constant depth of 1.8 m (5 ft 11 in). A traversable boom allows separation into two 25 m (82 ft) length pools, one of which can be varied in depth from floor level to 1.8 m (5 ft 11 in). The training pool's ceiling is in the shape of two long waves representing waves on water.
- A 25 m (82 ft) diving pool (ground level) with movable floor to allow a maximum depth of 5.1 m (17 ft). The pool is often also used for water polo, and scuba diving training.
- A "leisure pool" (ground floor) – a shallow water area suitable for younger pool users, with two water flumes and two bubble pools.
- Workout and fitness studios (behind the spectator seating), a health suite including sauna and steam room.
- Poolside café.

== Use ==
It is jointly owned by Manchester City Council, the University of Manchester and Manchester Metropolitan University. All the facilities can be used by members of the public.

The centre is the home of the City of Manchester Aquatics Swim Team, as well as Disability Swimming and Water Polo athletes within the English Institute of Sport.

As well as the 2002 Commonwealth Games, the MAC has been used for:

- Paralympic World Cup since 2005
- Training for 9th FINA World Short Course Championships 2008
- Duel in the Pool 2009
- LEN European Waterpolo
- Training for teams for the 2012 Olympic Games
- SwimBritain 2013

== Gallery ==
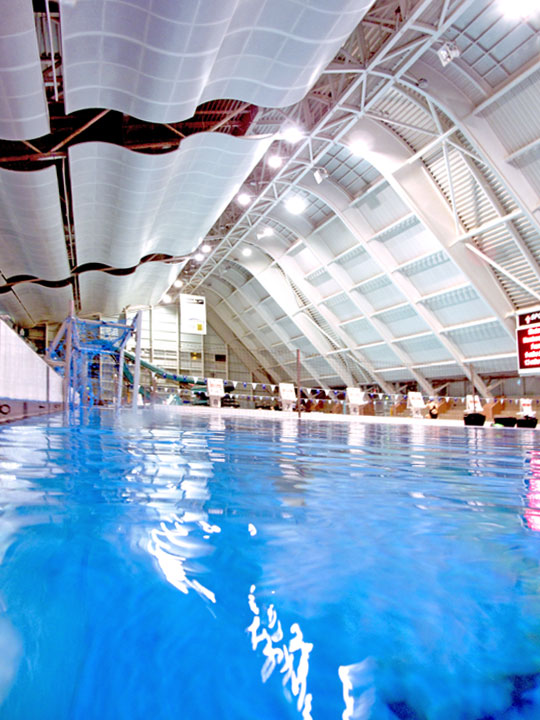
Inside the aquatics centre

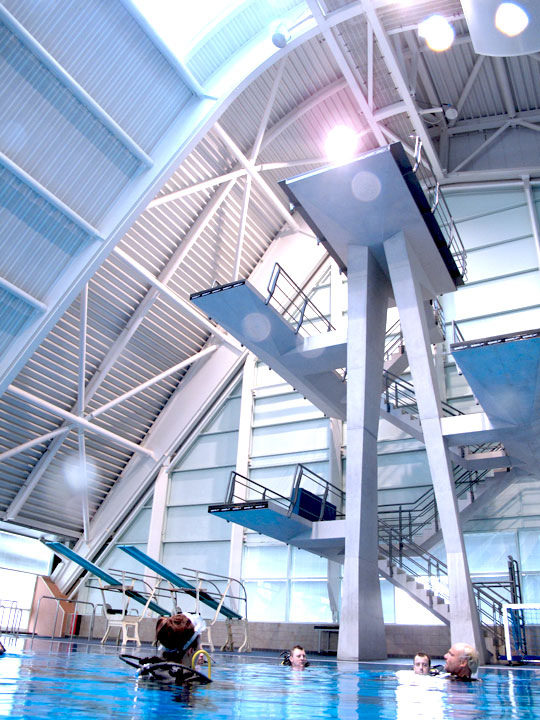
The diving tower

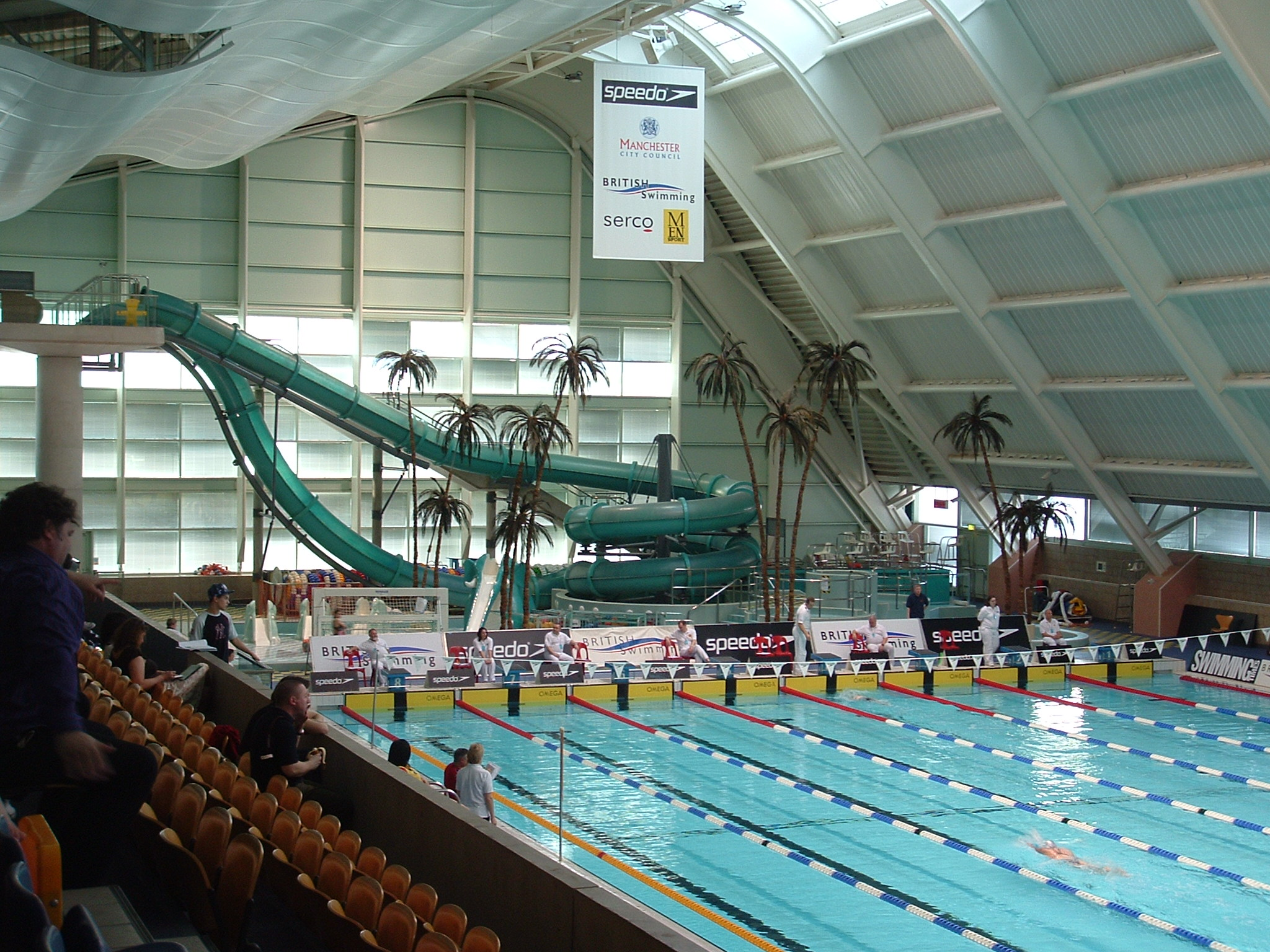
The water slide

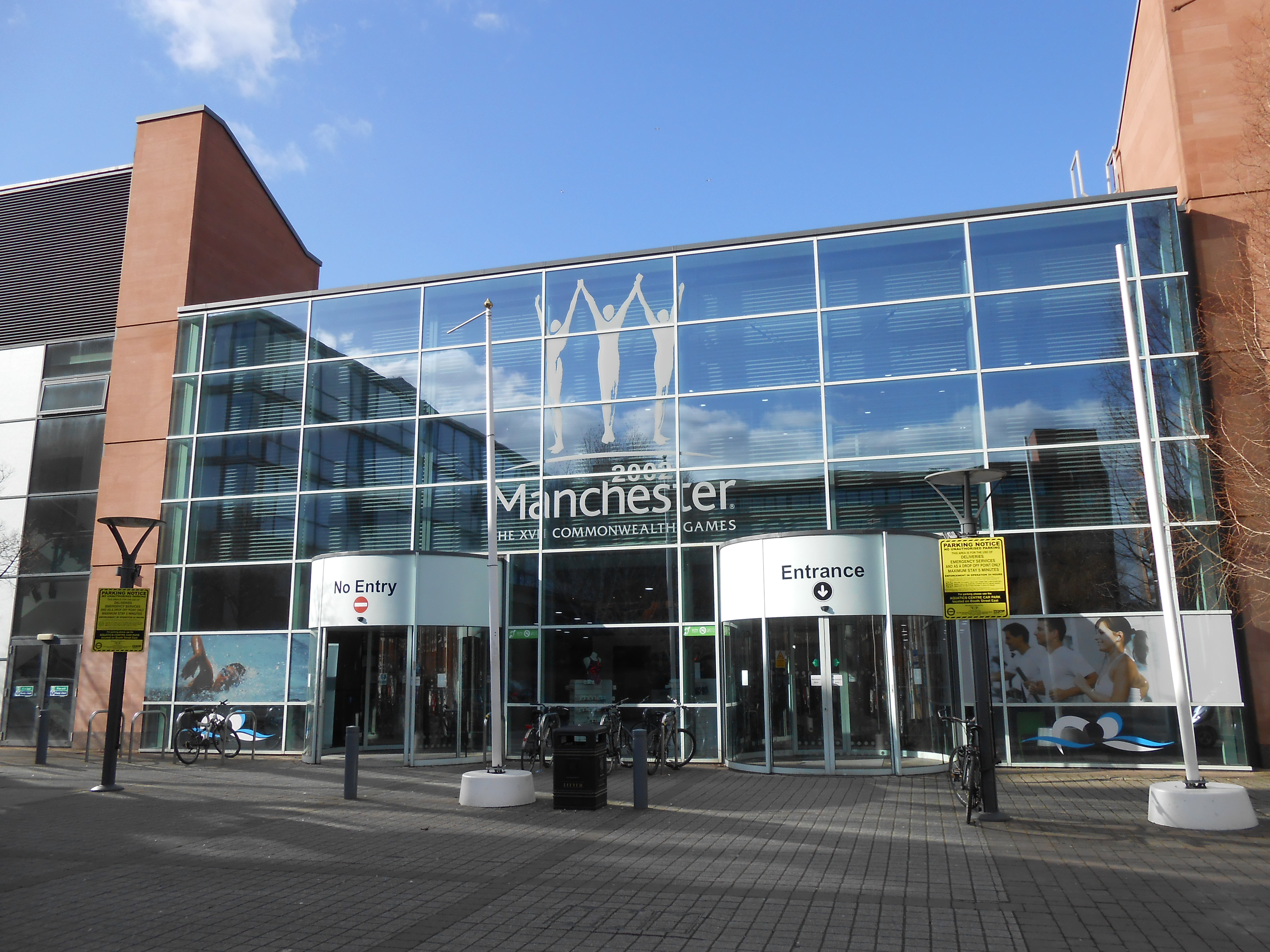
Entrance of the aquatics centre

== See also ==
- List of Commonwealth Games venues
