= List of Pan American Games medalists in shooting =

This is the complete list of Pan American Games medalists in shooting from 1951 to 2023.

== Men's - Individual ==
=== 10 m air pistol ===
Games	Gold	Silver	Bronze
1975	Hershel Anderson; United States	Nelson Oñate; Cuba	Santiago Trompeta; Cuba
1979	Don Nygord; United States	Don Hamilton; United States	Rafael Garden; Puerto Rico
1983	Carlos Hora; Peru	Don Nygord; United States	Luis Ortiz; Colombia
1987	Don Nygord; United States	Carlos Hora; Peru	Gregory Appleton; United States
1991	Bernardo Tovar; Colombia	Ben Amonette; United States	Wilson Scheidemantel; Brazil
1995	Norbelis Bárzaga; Cuba	Ben Amonette; United States	Vicente de la Cruz; Cuba
1999	Daryl Szarenski; United States	Felipe Beuvrín; Venezuela	Jason Meidinger; United States
2003	Jason Turner; United States	Maximo Modesti; Argentina	John Bickar; United States
2007	Jason Turner; United States	Júlio Almeida; Brazil	Thomas Rose; United States
2011	Daryl Szarenski; United States	Roger Daniel; Trinidad and Tobago	Júlio Almeida; Brazil
2015	Felipe Wu; Brazil	Jay Shi; United States	Mario Vinueza; Ecuador
2019	Jorge Grau; Cuba	Nick Mowrer; United States	Júlio Almeida; Brazil
2023	Tugrul Ozer; Canada	James Hall; United States	Felipe Wu; Brazil

=== 10 m air rifle ===
Games	Gold	Silver	Bronze
1975	Olegario Vázquez; Mexico	Lanny Bassham; United States	Carl Guenther; United States
1979	Guy Lorion; Canada	Ernest van de Zande; United States	Kurt Mitchell; Canada
1983	James Meredith; United States	David Johnson; United States	Guy Lorion; Canada
1987	Guy Lorion; Canada	Glenn Dubis; United States	Robert Foth; United States
1991	David Johnson; United States	Robert Foth; United States	Guy Lorion; Canada
1995	Ken Johnson; United States	Jean-François Sénécal; Canada	Glenn Dubis; United States
1999	Ken Johnson; United States	Glenn Dubis; United States	Wayne Sorensen; Canada
2003	Ángel Velarte; Argentina	Bradley Wheeldon; United States	Fabio Coelho; Brazil
2007	Jason Parker; United States	Matthew Rawlings; United States	Roberto Elias; Mexico
2011	Matthew Rawlings; United States	Jonathan Hall; United States	Gonzalo Moncada; Chile
2015	Connor Davis; United States	Julio Iemma; Venezuela	Bryant Wallizer; United States
2019	Lucas Kozeniesky; United States	Edson Ramírez; Mexico	Marcelo Gutiérrez; Argentina
2023	Edson Ramírez; Mexico	Rylan Kissell; United States	Cristian Morales; Peru

=== 10 m running target ===
Games	Gold	Silver	Bronze
1991	Francis Allen; United States	Julio Sandoval; Guatemala	Scott Swinney; United States
1995	Attila Solti; Guatemala	Lonn Saunders; United States	Andrés Felipe Torres; Colombia
1999	Attila Solti; Guatemala	Armando Ayala; United States	Andrés Felipe Torres; Colombia
2003	William Johnson; United States	Andrés Felipe Torres; Colombia	Armando Ayala; United States

=== 10 metre running target mixed runs ===
Games	Gold	Silver	Bronze
1995	Andrés Felipe Torres; Colombia	Josa Hernandez; Cuba	Lonn Saunders; United States

=== 25 metre standard pistol ===
Games	Gold	Silver	Bronze
1983	Erich Buljung; United States	George Ross; United States	Delival Nobre; Brazil
1987	Erich Buljung; United States	Guillermo Reyes; Cuba	Oscar Yuston; Argentina
1991	Eduardo Suárez; United States	Guillermo Reyes; Cuba	Don Nygord; United States
1995	Rafael Olivera; Argentina	Don Nygord; United States	Ben Amonette; United States

=== 25 metre center fire pistol ===
Games	Gold	Silver	Bronze
1955	Huelet Benner; United States	William McMillan; United States	John Forman; United States
1959	Aubrey Smith; United States	Oscar Cervo; Argentina	Garfield McMahon; Canada
1963	Thomas Smith; United States	William Blackenship; United States	Garfield McMahon; Canada
1967	Francis Higginson; United States	William Blackenship; United States	Jules Sobrian; Canada
1971	Francis Higginson; United States	Hezekiah Clark; United States	Jules Sobrian; Canada
1975	Marvin Black; United States	Hershel Anderson; United States	Leopoldo Ortega; Mexico
1979	Oscar Yuston; Argentina	Jerry Wilder; United States	Samuel Balocco; United States
1983	Erich Buljung; United States	Edgar Espinoza; Venezuela	Guillermo Reyes; Cuba
1987	Renzo Velazquez; Venezuela	Darius Young; United States	Felipe Beuvrín; Venezuela
1991	Don Nygord; United States	Darius Young; United States	Oscar Yuston; Argentina
1995	Dan Iuga; United States	Júlio Almeida; Brazil	Eduardo Suárez; United States

=== 25 metre rapid fire pistol ===
Games	Gold	Silver	Bronze
1951	Huelet Benner; United States	Enrique Díaz; Argentina	Oscar Cervo; Argentina
1955	Carlos Sánchez; Argentina	William McMillan; United States	John Forman; United States
1959	David Cartes; United States	Aubrey Smith; United States	Guillermo Cornejo; Peru
1963	Cecil Wallis; United States	Lawrence Mosely; United States	Manuel Fernandez; United States
1967	William McMillan; United States	Alirio Maya; Colombia	Edwin Teague; United States
1971	Víctor Castellanos; Guatemala	Alirio Maya; Colombia	Arturo Costa; Cuba
1975	Melvin Makin; United States	Jules Sobrian; Canada	James McCauley; United States
1979	Juan Hernández; Cuba	John McNally; United States	Bernardo Tovar; Colombia
1983	Terence Anderson; United States	Bernardo Tovar; Colombia	Rafael Rodríguez; Cuba
1987	Bernardo Tovar; Colombia	Rojelio Arredondo; United States	John McNally; United States
1991	John McNally; United States	Rafael Rodríguez; Cuba	Guillermo Reyes; Cuba
1995	Guido Arbona; Cuba	Dan Iuga; United States	Bernardo Tovar; Colombia
1999	Daniel César Felizia; Argentina	John McNally; United States	Bernardo Tovar; Colombia
2003	Leuris Pupo; Cuba	Juan Francisco Pérez; Cuba	John McNally; United States
2007	Leuris Pupo; Cuba	Keith Sanderson; United States	Fernando Cardoso; Brazil
2011	Emil Milev; United States	Juan Perez; Cuba	Franco Di Mauro; Venezuela
2015	Brad Balsley; United States	Emerson Duarte; Brazil	Douglas Gomez; Venezuela
2019	Jorge Álvarez; Cuba	Leuris Pupo; Cuba	Marko Carrillo; Peru
2023	Leuris Pupo; Cuba	Douglas Gómez; Venezuela	Henry Leverett; United States

=== 50 metre pistol ===
Games	Gold		Silver		Bronze	
1951	Edwin Vásquez; Peru	549 pts	Huelet Benner; United States	547 pts	Rafael Bermejo; Mexico	543 pts
1955	Huelet Benner; United States	649 pts	John Dodds; United States	544 pts	Pedro Avilés; Mexico	542 pts
1959	Nelson Lincoln; United States	546 pts	Tomás Cabañas; Cuba	538 pts	Roy Sutherland; United States	536 pts
1963	Franklin Green; United States	547 pts	Garfield McMahon; Canada	546 pts	Albin Merx; United States	541 pts
1967	Hershel Anderson; United States	548 pts	Javier Peregrina; Mexico	545 pts	Edgar Espinoza; Venezuela	542 pts
1971	Bertino de Souza; Brazil	552 pts	Hershel Anderson; United States	550 pts	Nelson Oñate; Cuba	545 pts
1975	Hershel Anderson; United States	559 pts	Melvin Makin; United States	552 pts	Jules Sobrian; Canada	544 pts
1979	Walter Bauza; Argentina	555 pts	Luis A. Baquero; Cuba	547 pts	Tom Guinn; Canada	547 pts
1983	Erich Buljung; United States		Silvio Aguiar; Brazil		Héctor Lima; Venezuela	
1987	George Ross; United States		Erich Buljung; United States		Bernardo Tovar; Colombia	
1991	Vicente de la Cruz; Cuba		Ben Amonette; United States		Rodney Colwell; Canada	
1995	Abel Juncosa; Cuba		Jodson Edington; Brazil		Ben Amonette; United States	
1999	Jason Meidinger; United States		Daryl Szarenski; United States		Norbelis Bárzaga; Cuba	
2003	Daryl Szarenski; United States		Arseny Borrero; Cuba		Norbelis Bárzaga; Cuba	
2007	Jason Turner; United States		Daryl Szarenski; United States		Yulio Zorrilla; Cuba	
2011	Sergio Sánchez; Guatemala		Daryl Szarenski; United States		Júlio Almeida; Brazil	
2015	Júlio Almeida; Brazil		Jorge Grau; Cuba		Marko Carrillo; Peru	

=== 50 metre rifle three positions ===
Games	Gold	Silver	Bronze
1951	Arthur Jackson; United States	Arthur Cook; United States	Julio Silva; Argentina
1955	Arthur Jackson; United States	Pedro Armella; Argentina	Verle Wright; United States
1959	Daniel Puckel; United States	Gerald Ouellette; Canada	Gary Anderson; United States
1963	Gary Anderson; United States	William Krilling; United States	Paulino Díaz; Mexico
1967	Margaret Murdock-Thompson; United States	Gerald Ouellette; Canada	Gary Anderson; United States
1971	John Writer; United States	Lones Wigger; United States	Miguel Valdés; Cuba
1975	Margaret Murdock-Thompson; United States	Lones Wigger; United States	Miguel Valdés; Cuba
1979	Lones Wigger; United States	Roderick Fitz-Randolph; United States	Guy Lorion; Canada
1983	Lones Wigger; United States	Anthony Leone; United States	Miguel Valdés; Cuba
1987	Glenn Dubis; United States	Mart Klepp; Canada	Robert Foth; United States
1991	Michael Anti; United States	Robert Foth; United States	Mart Klepp; Canada
1995	Ricardo Rusticucci; Argentina	David Johnson; United States	Robert Foth; United States
1999	Ken Johnson; United States	Pablo Álvarez; Argentina	Roberto Elias; Mexico
2003	Jason Parker; United States	Eric Uptagrafft; United States	Pablo Álvarez; Argentina
2007	Jason Parker; United States	Eliécer Pérez; Cuba	Juan Angeloni; Argentina
2011	Jason Parker; United States	Matthew Wallace; United States	Bruno Heck; Brazil
2015	Reinier Estpinan; Cuba	George Norton; United States	Ryan Anderson; United States
2019	Timothy Sherry; United States	Michael McPhail; United States	José Luis Sánchez; Mexico
2023	Carlos Quezada; Mexico	Timothy Sherry; United States	Lucas Kozeniesky; United States

=== 50 metre rifle prone ===
Games	Gold	Silver	Bronze
1951	Arthur Jackson; United States	Pedro Postigo; Argentina	Augusto Cires; Ecuador
1955	Arthur Jackson; United States	Gustavo Rojas; Chile	Horacio Martínez; Mexico
1959	Arthur Cook; United States	Ernesto Montemayor Jr. Mexico	Lita Baldwin; Peru
1963	Enrico Forcella; Venezuela	Lones Wigger; United States	Edward Gaygle; United States
1967	Alf Mayer; Canada	Rhody Normberg; United States	Olegario Vázquez; Mexico
1971	Victor Auer; United States	Gil Boa; Canada	Alf Mayer; Canada
1975	David Ross; United States	Durval Guimarães; Brazil	Miguel Valdés; Cuba
1979	Lones Wigger; United States	Adelso Peña; Cuba	Alf Mayer; Canada
1983	Roderick Fitz-Randolph; United States	Lones Wigger; United States	Arnaldo Rodríguez; Cuba
1987	Pat Vamplew; Canada	Bruce Meredith; Virgin Islands	Jean-François Sénécal; Canada
1991	Thomas Tamas; United States	Robert Foth; United States	Hugo Romero; Ecuador
1995	Rob Harbison; United States	Bruce Meredith; Virgin Islands	Michel Dion; Canada
1999	Matthew Emmons; United States	Wayne Sorensen; Canada	Henry Gerow; Canada
2003	Thomas Tamas; United States	Reinier Estpinan; Cuba	Ken Johnson; United States
2007	Thomas Tamas; United States	Michael McPhail; United States	Gale Stewart; Canada
2011	Michael McPhail; United States	Alex Suligoy; Argentina	Jason Parker; United States
2015	Cassio Rippel; Brazil	Michael McPhail; United States	Michel Dion; Canada

=== 50 metre high power rifle three positions ===
Games	Gold	Silver	Bronze
1951	Pablo Cagnasso; Argentina	Arthur Jackson; United States	David Schiaffino; Argentina
1955	Daniel Puckel; United States	Tommy Pool; United States	Jorge di Giandoménico; Argentina
1959	Pedro Armella; Argentina	Ramón Hagen; Argentina	Emmett Swanson; United States
1963	Gary Anderson; United States	Verle Wright; United States	Clinton Dahistron; Canada
1983	Lones Wigger; United States	Ray Carter; United States	Ricardo Rusticucci; Argentina; Patrick Wesche; Chile

=== 50 m running target ===
Games	Gold	Silver	Bronze
1983	Helmut Bellingrodt; Colombia	Randy Stewart; United States	Michael English; United States
1987	Michael English; United States	Todd Bensley; United States	Mark Bedlington; Canada
1991	Jorge Ríos; Cuba	José Hernández; Cuba	Troy Lawton; United States

=== 50 m high power rifle standing ===
Games	Gold	Silver	Bronze
1959	Daniel Puckel; United States	Jorge di Giandoménico; Argentina	Tommy Pool; United States

=== 50 m high power rifle kneeling ===
Games	Gold	Silver	Bronze
1959	Daniel Puckel; United States	Tommy Pool; United States	Jorge di Giandoménico; Argentina

=== 50 metre high power rifle prone ===
Games	Gold	Silver	Bronze
1959	Daniel Puckel; United States	Tommy Pool; United States	Clark White; Canada
1983	Boyd Goldsby; United States	Lones Wigger; United States	Pat Vamplew; Canada

=== 50 metre running target mixed runs ===
Games	Gold	Silver	Bronze
1991	Jorge Ríos; Cuba	Scott Swinney; United States	José Hernández; Cuba

=== 50 metre rifle kneeling ===
Games	Gold	Silver	Bronze
1959	James Carter; United States	Daniel Puckel; United States	Gerald Ouellette; Canada
1991	Michael Anti; United States	Mart Klepp; Canada	Thomas Tamas; United States

=== 50 metre rifle standing ===
Games	Gold	Silver	Bronze
1959	James Carter; United States	Daniel Puckel; United States	Gerald Ouellette; Canada
1991	Robert Foth; United States	Thomas Tamas; United States	Hermes Rodríguez; Cuba

=== 300 metre standard rifle ===
Games	Gold	Silver	Bronze
1995	Rob Harbison; United States	Robert Foth; United States	Edgardo Peragallo; Argentina

=== 300 metre rifle prone ===
Games	Gold	Silver	Bronze
1995	Webster Wright; United States	Ángel Velarte; Argentina	Robert Foth; United States

=== 300 metre rifle three positions ===
Games	Gold	Silver	Bronze
1995	Ken Johnson; United States	Stephen Goff; United States	Ricardo Rusticucci; Argentina

=== Free rifle three positions ===
Games	Gold	Silver	Bronze
1959	Gerald Ouellette; Canada	Verle Wright; United States	Clark White; Canada

=== Military rifle three positions ===
Games	Gold	Silver	Bronze
1951	Pablo Cagnasso; Argentina	Antonio Ando; Argentina	Ramón Hagen; Argentina
1955	Ramón Hagen; Argentina	Alfredo Cabello; Chile	Emmett Swanson; United States

=== Military rifle standing ===
Games	Gold		Silver		Bronze	
1951	Pablo Cagnasso; Argentina	419 pts	Antonio Ando; Argentina	412 pts	Ramón Hagen; Argentina	409 pts

=== Running deer ===
Games	Gold	Silver	Bronze
1955	Felipe del Milvorin; Mexico	Jesús Farias; Mexico	José del Campo; Mexico

=== Skeet ===
Games	Gold	Silver	Bronze
1951	Pablo Grossi; Argentina	Fulvio Rocchi; Argentina	Aroldo Pienovi; Argentina
1955	Kenneth Pendergras; United States	Igor Pezas; United States	Jaime Loyola; Puerto Rico
1959	Gilberto Navarro; Chile	Juan García; Venezuela	Barney Hartman; Canada
1963	Kenneth Sedlecky; United States	Juan García; Venezuela	Barney Hartman; Canada
1967	Allen Morrison; United States	Robert Schuehle; United States	Delfin Gómez; Cuba
1971	Robert Schuehle; United States	Tony Rosetti; United States	Servilio Torres; Cuba
1975	Athos Pisoni; Brazil	Robert Schuehle; United States	Roberto Castrillo; Cuba
1979	John Satterwhite; United States	Matthew Dryke; United States	Firmo Roberti; Argentina
1983	Matthew Dryke; United States	Roberto Castrillo; Cuba	Carlos Zarzar; Chile
1987	Matthew Dryke; United States	Alger Mullins; United States	Brian Gabriel; Canada
1991	Guillermo Alfredo Torres; Cuba	Dean Clark; United States	William Roy; United States
1999	Juan Miguel Rodríguez; Cuba	William Roy; United States	Clayton Miller; Canada
2003	Randy Sotowa; United States	Guillermo Alfredo Torres; Cuba	Diego Duarte; Colombia
2007	Vincent Hancock; United States	James Graves; United States	Ariel Flores; Mexico
2011	Vincent Hancock; United States	Guillermo Alfredo Torres; Cuba	Juan Miguel Rodríguez; Cuba
2015	Thomas Bayer; United States	Dustin Perry; United States	Juan Miguel Rodríguez; Cuba
2019	Christian Elliott; United States	Juan Schaeffer; Guatemala	Nicolás Pacheco; Peru
2023	Vincent Hancock; United States	Federico Gil; Argentina	Nicolás Pacheco; Peru

=== Trap ===
Games	Gold	Silver	Bronze
1975	Daniel Carlisle; United States	Donald Haldeman; United States	Justo Fernández; Mexico
1979	Robert Green; United States	Charvin Dixon; United States	George Leary; Canada
1983	Daniel Carlisle; United States	Marcos Olsen; Brazil	Diego Arcay; Venezuela
1987	Daniel Carlisle; United States	Kenneth Blasi; United States	Paul Shaw; Canada
1991	Jay Waldron; United States	George Leary; Canada	Richard Chordash; United States
1995	Lance Bade; United States	Bret Erickson; United States	George Leary; Canada
1999	Danilo Caro; Colombia	Lance Bade; United States	George Leary; Canada
2003	Lance Bade; United States	Rodrigo Bastos; Brazil	Danilo Caro; Colombia
2007	Juan Carlos Dasque; Argentina	Bret Erickson; United States	Giuseppe di Salvatore; Canada
2011	Jean Pierre Brol; Guatemala	Danilo Caro; Colombia	Roberto Schmits; Brazil
2015	Francisco Boza; Peru	Fernando Borello; Argentina	Danilo Caro; Colombia
2019	Brian Burrows; United States	Derek Haldeman; United States	Roberto Schmits; Brazil
2023	Jean Pierre Brol; Independent Athletes Team	Leonel Martínez; Venezuela	Hebert Brol; Independent Athletes Team

=== Double trap ===
Games	Gold	Silver	Bronze
1995	Alex Gyori; Canada	Kirk Reynolds; Canada	Stevens Puls; United States
1999	Lance Bade; United States	Charles Redding; United States	Luiz Craca; Brazil
2003	Jeffrey Holguin; United States	William Keever; United States	Lucas Bennazar; Puerto Rico
2007	Joshua Richmond; United States	Jeffrey Holguin; United States	Lucas Bennazar; Puerto Rico
2011	Glenn Eller; United States	José Torres; Puerto Rico	Luiz Da Graca; Brazil
2015	Hebert Brol; Guatemala	Sergio Piñero; Dominican Republic	Enrique Brol; Guatemala

== Women's - Individual ==
=== 10 m air pistol ===
Games	Gold	Silver	Bronze
1983	Cathy Graham; United States	Gail Liberty; United States	Linda Thom; Canada
1987	Tania Pérez; Cuba	Edith Vega; Cuba	Maria Amaral; Brazil
1991	Sharon Cozzarin; Canada	Elizabeth Callahan; United States	Tânia Giansante; Brazil
1995	Connie Petracek; United States	Lorena Guado; Argentina	Lilia María Pérez; Argentina
1999	Kim Eagles; Canada	María Franco; Venezuela	Margarita Tarradell; Cuba
2003	Francis Gorrin; Venezuela	Amanda Mondol; Colombia	Lynda Hare; Canada
2007	Avianna Chao; Canada	Luisa Maida; El Salvador	Kirenia Bello; Cuba
2011	Dorothy Ludwig; Canada	Maribel Pineda; Venezuela	Sandra Uptagrafft; United States
2015	Lynda Kiejko; Canada	Alejandra Zavala; Mexico	Lilian Castro; El Salvador
2019	Laina Pérez; Cuba	Andrea Pérez Peña; Ecuador	Sheyla González; Cuba
2023	Alejandra Zavala; Mexico	Alexis Lagan; United States	Diana Durango; Ecuador

=== 10 m air rifle ===
Games	Gold	Silver	Bronze
1983	Pat Spurgin; United States	Wanda Jewell; United States	Alejandra Hoyos; Colombia
1987	Sharon Bowes; Canada	Launi Meili; United States	Deena Wigger; United States
1991	Debra Sinclair; United States	Launi Meili; United States	Sharon Bowes; Canada
1995	Elizabeth Bourland; United States	Amelia Fournel; Argentina	Ann-Marie Pfiffner; United States
1999	Jayme Dickman; United States	Sharon Bowes; Canada	Amelia Fournel; Argentina
2003	Eglis Yaima Cruz; Cuba	Melissa Mulloy; United States	Amelia Fournel; Argentina
2007	Eglis Yaima Cruz; Cuba	Amy Sowash; United States	Alix Moncada; Mexico
2011	Emily Caruso; United States	Eglis Yaima Cruz; Cuba	Rosa Peña; Mexico
2015	Goretti Zumaya; Mexico	Fernanda Russo; Argentina	Eglis Yaima Cruz; Cuba
2019	Alison Weisz; United States	Minden Miles; United States	Fernanda Russo; Argentina
2023	Sagen Maddalena; United States	Fernanda Russo; Argentina	Mary Tucker; United States

=== 25 metre pistol ===
Games	Gold	Silver	Bronze
1983	Kim Dyer; United States	Linda Thom; Canada	Gail Liberty; United States
1987	Ruby Fox; United States	Edith Vega; Cuba	Bettie Blocksome; United States
1991	Margarita Tarradell; Cuba	Connie Petracek; United States	Roxane Thompson; United States
1995	Connie Petracek; United States	Margarita Tarradell; Cuba	Lorena Guado; Argentina
1999	Elizabeth Callahan; United States	Rebecca Snyder; United States	María Rueda; Colombia
2003	Sandra Uptagrafft; United States	Margarita Tarradell; Cuba	Natalia Tobar; Colombia
2007	Sandra Uptagrafft; United States	Laina Pérez; Cuba	Luisa Maida; El Salvador
2011	Ana Luiza Mello; Brazil	Sandra Uptagrafft; United States	Maribel Pineda; Venezuela
2015	Lynda Kiejko; Canada	Sandra Uptagrafft; United States	Mariana Nava; Mexico
2019	Sandra Uptagrafft; United States	Diana Durango; Ecuador	Andrea Pérez Peña; Ecuador
2023	Alejandra Zavala; Mexico	Diana Durango; Ecuador	Alexis Lagan; United States

=== 50 metre rifle prone ===
Games	Gold	Silver	Bronze
1983	Deena Wigger; United States	Pat Spurgin; United States	Nilzer Cuba; Cuba
1987	Deena Wigger; United States	Mary Godlove; United States	Joeller Fefer; Canada
1991	Tammie de Angelis; United States	Christina Ashcroft; Canada	Michele Scarborough; United States
1995	Cecilia Zeid; Argentina	Elizabeth Bourland; United States	Katherine Kelemen; United States

=== 50 metre rifle three positions ===
Games	Gold	Silver	Bronze
1983	Wanda Jewell; United States	Gloria Parmentier; United States	Christina Schulze; Canada
1987	Irma Sánchez; Cuba	Launi Meili; United States	Mary Godlove; United States
1991	Debra Sinclair; United States	Tammie de Angelis; United States	Christina Ashcroft; Canada
1995	Deena Wigger; United States	Sharon Bowes; Canada	Wanda Jewell; United States
1999	Jayme Dickman; United States	Nancy Johnson; United States	Christina Ashcroft; Canada
2003	Eglis Yaima Cruz; Cuba	Sarah Blakeslee; United States	Hattie Jean Ponti-Johnson; United States
2007	Jamie Beyerle; United States	Eglis Yaima Cruz; Cuba	Amanda Furrer; United States
2011	Dianelys Pérez; Cuba	Eglis Yaima Cruz; Cuba	Sarah Beard; United States
2015	Eglis Yaima Cruz; Cuba	Amelia Fournel; Argentina	Yarimar Mercado; Puerto Rico
2019	Sarah Beard; United States	Eglis Yaima Cruz; Cuba	Virginia Thrasher; United States
2023	Mary Tucker; United States	Sagen Maddalena; United States	Shannon Westlake; Canada

=== Trap ===
Games	Gold	Silver	Bronze
1999	Deena Minyard; United States	Cindy Gentry; United States	Susan Nattrass; Canada
2003	Whitly Loper; United States	Cynthia Meyer; Canada	Janice Teixeira; Brazil
2007	Susan Nattrass; Canada	Deborah Feliciano; Puerto Rico	Corey Cogdell; United States
2011	Miranda Wilder; United States	Lindsay Boddez; Canada	Kayle Browning; United States
2015	Amanda Chudoba; Canada	Kayle Browning; United States	Kimberley Bowers; United States
2019	Ashley Carroll; United States	Rachel Tozier; United States	Alejandra Ramírez; Mexico
2023	Adriana Ruano; Independent Athletes Team	Waleska Soto; Independent Athletes Team	Rachel Tozier; United States

=== Double trap ===
Games	Gold	Silver	Bronze
1995	Theresa Wentzel; United States	Susan Nattrass; Canada	Deena Julin; United States
1999	Kim Rhode; United States	Cynthia Meyer; Canada	Sandra Honour; Canada
2003	Kim Rhode; United States	Cynthia Meyer; Canada	Susan Nattrass; Canada

=== Skeet ===
Games	Gold	Silver	Bronze
1999	Terry Bankey; United States	Cindy Shenberger; United States	Tami Wah; Canada
2003	Brandie Neal; United States	Melisa Gil; Argentina	Linda Conley; Canada
2007	Haley Dunn; United States	Kim Rhode; United States	Melisa Gil; Argentina
2011	Kim Rhode; United States	Francisca Crovetto; Chile	Melisa Gil; Argentina
2015	Kim Rhode; United States	Melisa Gil; Argentina	Francisca Crovetto; Chile
2019	Kim Rhode; United States	Francisca Crovetto; Chile	Dania Vizzi; United States
2023	Francisca Crovetto; Chile	Gabriela Rodríguez; Mexico	Daniella Borda; Peru

== Mixed pairs events ==
=== 10 m air pistol ===
Games	Gold	Silver	Bronze
2019	Cuba; Jorge Grau; Laina Pérez	United States; Nick Mowrer; Miglena Todorova	Ecuador; Yautung Cueva; Andrea Pérez Peña
2023	Mexico; Carlos González; Andrea Ibarra	Mexico; Daniel Urquiza; Alejandra Zavala	United States; Nick Mowrer; Lisa Emmert

=== 10 m air rifle ===
Games	Gold	Silver	Bronze
2019	Argentina; Marcelo Gutiérrez; Fernanda Russo	United States; Lucas Kozeniesky; Minden Miles	Mexico; Edson Ramírez; Gabriela Martínez
2023	United States; Rylan Kissell; Mary Tucker	Mexico; Edson Ramírez; Goretti Zumaya	United States; Gavin Barnick; Sagen Maddalena

=== Mixed trap ===
Games	Gold	Silver	Bronze
2019	United States; Derek Haldeman; Ashley Carroll	United States; Brian Burrows; Rachel Tozier	Canada; Curtis Wennberg; Amanda Chudoba
2023	United States; Vincent Hancock; Dania Vizzi	Mexico; Luis Gallardo; Gabriela Rodríguez	United States; Dustan Taylor; Austen Smith

== Men's team ==
=== 10 metre air pistol ===
Games	Gold	Silver	Bronze
1975	Cuba	United States	Mexico
1979	United States	Brazil; Paulo Lamego; Sylvio Carvalho	Puerto Rico
1983	Ecuador; Paúl Margraff; Ronald Dunn	United States	Venezuela
1987	United States	Peru	Cuba
1991	Mexico	Dominican Republic	Brazil
1995	United States	Cuba	Canada

=== 10 metre air rifle ===
Games	Gold	Silver	Bronze
1975	United States	Cuba	Mexico
1979	United States	Cuba	Argentina
1983	United States	Canada	Argentina
1987	Canada	United States	Cuba
1991	Canada	United States	Cuba
1995	United States	Canada	Cuba

=== 10 metre running target ===
Games	Gold	Silver	Bronze
1991	Guatemala	United States	Cuba
1995	Guatemala	United States	Cuba

=== 10 metre running target mixed runs ===
Games	Gold	Silver	Bronze
1995	United States	Cuba	Guatemala

=== 25 metre standard pistol team ===
Games	Gold		Silver		Bronze	
1983	United States; Erich Buljung; George Ross; Don Nygord	1718 pts	Colombia; Bernardo Tovar; Alfredo González; Luis Colina	1670 pts	Venezuela; Felipe Beuvrín; Manuel Guevara; Humberto Guirigay	1669 pts
1987	Venezuela; Felipe Beuvrín; Víctor Villalobos; José Becerra	1673 pts	Cuba; Guillermo Reyes; Luis A. Baquero; Juan C. Hernandez	1641 pts	Puerto Rico; Maximino Rivera; Angel Correas; Julio Ortega	1639 pts
1991	United States; Don Nygord; Ed Suarez; Darius Young		Argentina; Jorge Almirón; Oscar Yuston		Cuba; Guillermo Reyes	
1995	United States; Don Nygord; Ben Amonette; Terence Anderson	1691 pts	Argentina; Rafael Alberto Oliveira; Daniel César Felizia; Jorge Edgardo Almiron	1684 pts	Cuba; Guillermo Reyes; Norbelis Bárzaga; Guido Arbona	1683 pts

=== 25 metre rapid fire pistol team ===
Games	Gold	Silver	Bronze
1951	Argentina; Dionisio Fernández; Enrique Díaz; Ernesto Guillón; Oscar Cervo	Brazil; Ademar Onéssimo Faller; Adhaury Rocha; Allan Sobocinski; Pedro Simão	Mexico; Ernesto Montemayor Sr. José Reyes; Manuel Larrañaga; Miguel Lambarri
1955	United States	Argentina	Mexico
1959	United States	Peru	Argentina
1963	United States	Argentina	Mexico
1967	United States	Venezuela	Mexico
1971	Cuba	Colombia	United States
1975	United States	Cuba	Mexico
1979	Cuba	United States	Colombia
1983	United States	Cuba	Colombia
1987	Colombia	United States	Cuba
1991	United States	Cuba	Colombia
1995	United States	Cuba	Argentina

=== 25 metre center fire pistol team ===
Games	Gold		Silver		Bronze	
1955	United States; Huelet Benner; William McMillan; John Forman; John Jagoda	2311 pts	Puerto Rico; Miguel Emanuelli; Alberto Guerrero; Ernesto Rivera; Viviano Ramirez	2252 pts	Venezuela; Carlos Monteverde; Carlos Marrero; Humberto Paredes; José Bernal	2234 pts
1959	United States; Aubrey Smith; Roy Sutherland; Richard Stineman; David Cartes	2266 pts	Venezuela; Carlos Crassus; Hermann Espinal; Carlos Monteverde; Pedro Bujana	2214 pts	Puerto Rico; José López; Leon Lyon; Manuel González; Zenon Rosa	2213 pts
1963	United States; Thomas Smith; William Blackenship; William Mellon; William McMillan	2343 pts	Canada; Garfield McMahon; David Doig; Fernand LaPointe; William Hare	2262 pts	Mexico; Enrique Torres; Camilo Kuri; Miguel Torres; Homero Laddaga	2261 pts
1967	United States; Francis Higginson; William Blackenship; Bonnie Harmon; Don Hamilton	2342 pts	Canada; Jules Sobrian; David Colon; James Lockham; John Clifford	2280 pts	Venezuela; Guillermo Rincon; Jerko Jurin; Rafael Acosta; José-Antonio Chalbaud	2264 pts
1971	United States; Francis Higginson; Hezekiah Clark; Roberto Whitacre; James McCauley	2353 pts	Canada; Jules Sobrian; James Lee; William Hare; Garfield McMahon	2321 pts	Cuba; Nelson Oñate; Arturo Costa; Arnoldo Bonzon; Eloy Menendez	2308 pts
1975	United States; James McCauley; Bruce Chreene; Hershel Anderson; Marvin Black	2334 pts	Argentina; Jorge A. Luca; Oscar Yuston; Roger Guado; Aldo Chesi	2297 pts	Cuba; Roberto García; Arnoldo Bonzon; Arturo Costa; Guillermo Reyes	2281 pts
1979	United States; Samuel Baiocco; Jerry Wilder; Jimmie Dorsey; Darius Young	2305 pts	Canada; Jules Sobrian; Steven Kelly; Edward Jans; Robert Zimmer	2281 pts	Argentina; Aldo Chesi; Roger Guado; Julio Oviedo; Oscar Yuston	2280 pts
1983	Venezuela; Edgar Espinoza; Víctor Villalobos; Marcos T. Nunez	1752 pts	United States; Erich Buljung; Don Nygord; Jimmie McCoy	1739 pts	Cuba; Guillermo Reyes; Juan C. Hernandez; Rodolfo Vidaurreta	1734 pts
1987	United States; Darius Young; Don Nygord; Rojelio Arredondo	1741 pts	Venezuela; Renzo Berto Velazquez; Felipe Beuvrín; Alberto Olavarria	1741 pts	Brazil; Durval Guimarães; Benvenuto Tilli; Alfredo Lalia	1720 pts
1991	United States; Don Nygord; Ed Suarez; Darius Young		Brazil; Durval Guimarães		Argentina; Oscar Yuston	
1995	United States; Dan Iuga; Eduardo Suarez; Darius Young	1726 pts	Brazil; Júlio Almeida; Mauriverth Spena Jr; Fernando Cardoso Jr	1716 pts	Argentina; Ricardo Yuston; Rafael Alberto Oliveira; Daniel César Felizia	1703 pts

=== 50 metre pistol team ===
Games	Gold		Silver		Bronze	
1951	Mexico; José Reyes; Miguel Lambarri; Pedro Avilés; Rafael Bermejo; Raúl Ibarra	2683 pts	Argentina; Alberto Martijena; Ángel Manelli; Antonio Cannavo; Oscar Bidegain; Pablo Cagnasso	2633 pts	Peru; César Injoque; Edwin Vásquez; Pedro Puente; Vicente Portaro; Wenceslao Salgado	2632 pts
1955	United States; John Forman; John Dodds; Huelet Benner; Thomas Mitchell; John Jagoda	2671 pts	Argentina; Angel Manelli; Oscar Bidegain; Alberto Martijena; Ividio Garay; Antonio Cannavo	2619 pts	Mexico; José Reyes; Miguel Lambarri; Pedro Avilés; Manuel Larranaga; Raúl Ibarra	2618 pts
1959	United States; Roy Sutherland; Victor Maass; Nelson Lincoln; Lloyd Burchett	2128 pts	Argentina; Ovidio Garay; Alberto Martijena; Valerio Oliva; Angel Manelli	2069 pts	Canada; James Zavitz; Garfield McMahon; Thomas Cocking; Godfrey Brunner	2068 pts
1963	United States; Franklin Green; Elvin Merx; Robert Meagher; Paul Shauk	2170 pts	Canada; Garfield McMahon; David Doig; William Hare; Fernand LaPointe	2146 pts	Brazil; Benvenuto Tilli; Durval Guimarães; Álvaro dos Santos; Francisco Estrella	2104 pts
1967	United States; Hershel Anderson; Arnold Vitarbo; William Blackenship; Franklin Green	2171 pts	Cuba; Nelson Oñate; Arturo Costa; Enrique Borbonet; Andre Sequeiro	2127 pts	Mexico; Javier Peregrina; Leopoldo Martínez; Rafael Bermajo; Héctor Pérez	2118 pts
1971	United States; Hershel Anderson; Emile Heugatter; Francis Higginson; Hezekiah Clark	2152 pts	Cuba; Nelson Oñate; Santiago Trompeta; Leonardo Benedicto; Roberto García	2146 pts	Venezuela; Edgar Espinoza; Ángel Orellana; Juba Manner; Hector Lima	2124 pts
1975	United States; Hershel Anderson; Melvin Makin; Jimmie Dorsey; Richard Crawford	2194 pts	Canada; Jules Sobrian; Tom Guinn; Edward Jans; William Molnar	2133 pts	Mexico; Alfredo Lopez; Juventino Sánchez; Javier Padilla; Gildardo Bravo	2133 pts
1979	Canada; Tom Guinn; Edward Jans; Manley Wolochow; Arthur Tomsett	2138 pts	Cuba; Arturo Castillo; Pedro Bermúdez; Luis Baquero; Gonzalo Gonzalez	2134 pts	Puerto Rico; Jose Costas; Johnny Cannizzaro; Rafael Garden; Fidel Pérez	2127 pts
1983	Venezuela; Hector Lima; Edgar Espinoza; Víctor Villalobos	1640 pts	United States; Erich Buljung; Don Nygord; Jimmie McCoy	1631 pts	Brazil; Durval Guimarães; Silvio Aguiar; Wilson Scheidemantel	1621 pts
1991	Canada	1628 pts	Cuba	1627 pts	Venezuela	1593 pts
1995	Cuba	1655 pts	United States	1652 pts	Guatemala	1621 pts

=== 50 metre rifle three positions team ===
Games	Gold	Silver	Bronze
1951	Argentina; David Schiaffino; Fernando Potente; Julio Silva; Oscar Olmos; Rubén Longhi	Chile; Gustavo Rojas; Juan Bizama; Julio Arriagada; Miguel Niño; Vicente Herrera	Peru; Enrique Baldwin; Guillermo Baldwin; Luis Albornoz; Luis Mantilla; Rubén Váldez
1955	United States	Argentina	Mexico
1959	United States	Argentina	Canada
1963	United States	Canada	Peru
1967	United States	Canada	Mexico
1971	United States	Cuba	Argentina
1975	United States	Cuba	Canada
1979	United States	Canada	Cuba
1983	United States	Canada	Cuba
1987	United States	Canada	Cuba
1991	United States	Cuba	Argentina
1995	United States	Argentina	Cuba

=== 50 metre high power rifle prone ===
Games	Gold	Silver	Bronze
1983	United States	Canada	Argentina

=== 50 metre high power rifle three positions team ===
Games	Gold		Silver		Bronze	
1951	Argentina; David Schiaffino; Juan Martino; Julio Silva; Pablo Cagnasso; Pablo Pedotti	5355 pts	Mexico; Antonio Mendoza; Joel Gálvez; José de la Torre; José Nozari; Sebastián de la Cerda	4885 pts	Cuba; Gregorio Moya; José Landín; Juan Chávez; Rafael Rodríguez; Rufino Gutiérrez	4399 pts
1955	United States; Emmett Swanson; Arthur Jackson; Verle Wright; August Westgaard; Robert Sandager	5422 pts	Argentina; Pedro Armella; Ramon Hagen; Maximo Lagarejo; Alcides Murga; Antonio Ando	5409 pts	Venezuela; Humberto Briceño; Juan Llabot; Rigoberto Rivero; John López; Jose P. Valdez	5021 pts
1959	United States; Daniel Puckel; Tommy Pool; Gary Anderson; Eugene Spradlin	4491 pts	Argentina; Jorge di Giandoménico; Pedro Armella; Pablo Cagnasso; Antonio Ando	4317 pts	Peru; Rodolfo Valdez; Teodoro Bullon; Luis Albornoz; Guillermo Baldwin	4040 pts
1963	United States; Gary Anderson; Verle Wright; John Bertva; Martin Gunnarsson	4557 pts	Argentina; Ricardo Villordo; Dario del Monico; Antonio Ando; David Schiaffino	4216 pts	Brazil; Milton Sobocinski; Edmar de Salles; Amilcar de Moura; Alvaro Altmann	3918 pts
1983	United States; Robert Aylward; Ray Carter; Lones Wigger	3366 pts	Canada; Jean-François Sénécal; Pat Vamplew; Michel Dion	3269 pts	Cuba; Alberto Gilart; Miguel Valdes; Jose I. Cruz	3261 pts

=== 50 metre rifle prone team ===
Games	Gold		Silver		Bronze	
1951	Argentina; Cirilo Nassiff; Delmo Remy; Pedro Postigo; Roberto Salvagno; Rúben Longhi	2918 pts	Peru; Elías Benavides; Enrique Baldwin; Guillermo Baldwin; Julio Poggi; Rubén Váldez	2896 pts	Brazil; Allan Sobocinski; Alberto Braga; Antônio Guimarães; Ernani Martins Neves; João Sobocinski	2895 pts
1955	United States; Allan Luke; Arthur Jackson; Emmett Swanson; August Westgaard	2348 pts	Chile; Vicente Herrera; Gustavo Rojas; Pedro Jara; Alfredo Urrutia	2340 pts	Mexico; Roberto de la Garza; Felipe del Milvorin; Horatio Martinez; Guillermo Narvaez	2332 pts
1959	United States; Arthur Cook; Martin Gunnarsson; Presley Kendall; James Eberwine	2317 pts	Peru; Carlos Lastarria; Lita Baldwin; Guillermo Baldwin; Oscar Caceres	2297 pts	Canada; Gerald Ouellette; Edgard Tiilen; Evald Gering; Clark White	2291 pts
1963	United States; Lones Wigger; Edward Gaygle; William Krilling; Gary Anderson	2349 pts	Mexico; Olegario Vázquez; Raul Arredondo; Paulino Díaz; Jose Saenz	2324 pts	Venezuela; Enrico Forcella; José Cazorla; Agustin Rangel; Enrique Lucca	2321 pts
1967	United States; David Ross; Gary Anderson; Rhody Nornberg; Bruce Meredith	2379 pts	Canada; Alf Mayer; Bev Pinney; Gil Boa; James Hennock	2363 pts	Mexico; Olegario Vázquez; Jesús Elizondo; Jesus Espinosa; Ernesto Montemayor Jr.	2347 pts
1971	United States; Victor Auer; Clifford Davis; David Ross; Watkins Stuart	2362 pts	Cuba; Silvio Delgado; Miguel Valdes; Adelso Peña; Orestes Soria	2360 pts	Canada; Gil Boa; Alf Mayer; James Hennock; Arne Sorensen	2359 pts
1975	United States; David Ross; Ernest Van de Zande; Victor Auer; Margaret Murdock	2374 pts	Mexico; Olegario Vázquez; Jesús Elizondo; José Álvarez; Ernesto Montemayor Jr.	2362 pts	Brazil; Durval Guimarães; Waldemar Capucci; Edmar de Salles; Milton Sobocinski	2361 pts
1979	United States; Lones Wigger; Boyd Goldsby; Dennis Ghiselli; Ernest Van de Zande	2373 pts	Cuba; Adelso Peña; Raul Sosa; José Cruz; Miguel Valdes	2350 pts	Brazil; Dilson Reis; Durval Guimarães; Waldemar Capucci; Milton Sobocinski	2345 pts
1983	United States; Roderick Fitz-Randolph; Lones Wigger; James Meredith	1776 pts	Canada; Pat Vamplew; Glen Hewitt; Michel Dion	1768 pts	Cuba; Arnaldo Rodríguez; Miguel Valdes; Adelso Peña	1760 pts
1987	Canada; Pat Vamplew; Jean-François Sénécal; Mike Ashcroft	1784 pts	Argentina; Julio Iemma; Ricardo Rusticucci; Rodolfo Tarraubella	1775 pts	United States; Webster Wright; Brad Carnes; Dan Curben	1770 pts
1991	United States; Michael Anti; Robert Foth; Thomas Tamas	1783 pts	Cuba	1756 pts	Argentina	1755 pts
1995	Cuba; Arnoldo Rodriguez; Hermes Rodriguez; Ángel Rodríguez	1762 pts	United States; Rob Harbison; Robert Foth; Webster Wright	1756 pts	Argentina; Gambino Hernandez; Oscar Petrocelli; Ricardo Rio	1739 pts

=== 50 m Rifle Standing Teams ===
Games	Gold	Silver	Bronze
1959	United States	Argentina	Canada

=== 50 m Rifle Kneeling Teams ===
Games	Gold	Silver	Bronze
1959	United States	Argentina	Canada

=== 50 metre running target ===
Games	Gold	Silver	Bronze
1983	United States	Colombia	Cuba
1991	Cuba	United States	Colombia

=== 50 metre running target mixed runs ===
Games	Gold	Silver	Bronze
1991	Cuba	United States	Guatemala

=== 300 metre rifle prone ===
Games	Gold	Silver	Bronze
1995	United States	Argentina	Brazil

=== 300 metre rifle three positions ===
Games	Gold	Silver	Bronze
1995	United States	Brazil	Argentina

=== 300 metre standard rifle ===
Games	Gold	Silver	Bronze
1995	United States	Argentina	Brazil

=== Military rifle three positions team ===
Games	Gold	Silver	Bronze
1951	Argentina	Peru	Chile
1955	Chile	Argentina	United States

=== Military rifle standing team ===
Games	Gold		Silver		Bronze	
1951	Argentina	1634 pts	Peru	1569 pts	Chile	1544 pts

=== Free Rifle 3 Positions Teams ===
Games	Gold	Silver	Bronze
1959	Canada	United States	Mexico

=== Skeet team ===
Games	Gold		Silver		Bronze	
1951	Argentina; Aroldo Pienovi; Fulvio Rocchi; Geronimo Cosoli; Pablo Grossi	756 pts	Brazil; Antônio Snizeck; Edimar Eichemberg; Guido Albertini; Max Schrappe	747 pts		
1959	United States; Edwin Calhoun; Chesley Crites; Oliver Davis; Kenneth Pendergras	779 pts	Venezuela; Juan García; Arnaldo Rincones; Mercedes Meta; Guillermo Raydan	770 pts	Cuba; José Artecona; Pablo Bardino; Jose Junquera; Justo Lamar	757 pts
1963	United States; Kenneth Sedlecky; Henry Shaw; Gordon Horner; David Bywater	586 pts	Venezuela; Juan García; Mercedes Matt; Guillermo Raydan; Inaki Olassagasti	581 pts	Canada; Barney Hartman; Eddie Tuvo; Hugh Garland; Leslie Clegg	578 pts
1967	United States; Allen Morrison; Robert Schuehle; Robert Rodale; Allen Buntrock	379 pts	Cuba; Fortunato Casal; Delfin Gómez; Roberto Castrillo; Ignacio Huguet	376 pts	Chile; Nicolas Atalah; Gilberto Navarro; Angel Marentis; Armando Gellona	373 pts
1971	United States; Allen Buntrock; Chuck Mayhew; Robert Schuehle; Tony Rosetti	578 pts	Cuba; Delfin Gómez; Roberto Castrillo; Rubén Vega; Servilio Torres	574 pts	Chile; Jorge Uauy; Antonio Yaqigi; Jaime Bunstar; Sergio Gei Gallart	566 pts
1975	Cuba; Servilio Torres; Roberto Castrillo; Ignacio Huguet; Rubén Vega	389 pts	Brazil; José Costa; Sergio Basto; Romeu Luchiari; Athos Pisoni	381 pts	Mexico; Raúl Sánchez; Mirek Switalski; Juan Bueno; Jorge Aleman	381 pts
1979	United States; Matthew Dryke; Joe Clemmons; Jeffrey Sizemore; John Satterwhite	566 pts	Chile; Alfonso de Iruarrizaga; Jorge Houdely; Antonio Yaqigi; Miguel Zerene	548 pts	Cuba; Guillermo Alfredo Torres; Mario Lopez; Roberto Castrillo; Luis Cabrerea	547 pts
1983	United States; Matthew Dryke; Dean Clark; Michael Thompson	442 pts	Cuba; Roberto Castrillo; Guillermo Alfredo Torres; Luis Cabrera	440 pts	Chile; Alfonso de Iruarrizaga; Carlos Zarzar; Cristian Lasen	436 pts
1987	United States; Matthew Dryke; All Mullins; Daniel Carlisle	439 pts	Cuba; Servando Puldón; Guillermo Alfredo Torres; Delfin Gómez	431 pts	Canada; Brian Gabriel; Don Kwasnycia; Fritz Altmann	430 pts
1991	United States; Dean Clark; William Roy; Mike Schmidt	445 pts	Cuba; Guillermo Alfredo Torres	442 pts	Argentina; Firmo Roberti	437 pts
1995	Cuba; Juan Miguel Rodríguez; Servando Puldón; Guillermo Alfredo Torres	361 pts	Canada; J. F. Nixon; Don Kwasnycia; Jason Caswell	352 pts	Guatemala; Juan Carlos Romero; Francisco Romero; Erick Zachrison	352 pts

=== Trap ===
Games	Gold		Silver		Bronze	
1975	United States; Daniel Carlisle; Donald Haldeman; Walter Zobell; Charvin Dixon	391 pts	Canada; John Primrose; James Platz; Larry Ivanny; Edward Wladichuk	380 pts	Brazil; Marcos Olsen; Athos Pisoni; Francisco Alava; Mario Morganti	375 pts
1979	United States; Ernest Neel; Charvin Dixon; Robert Green; Walter Zobell	563 pts	Brazil; Marcos Olsen; Paulo Manterio; Flavio Bonet; Francisco Alava	533 pts	Canada; George Leary; John Primrose; John Cowan; James Kagan	502 pts
1983	United States; Daniel Carlisle; Dayne Johnson; Peter Piffath	442 pts	Venezuela; Diego Arcay; Leonel Martínez; José Figueroa	440 pts	Chile; Pablo Vergara; Francisco Posada; Rolando Abuhadba	430 pts
1987	United States; Daniel Carlisle; Kenneth Blasi; George Haas	442 pts	Canada; Paul Shaw; John Primrose; Fred White	434 pts	Brazil; Marcos Olsen; Alain Dufour; Rodrigo Bastos	431 pts
1991	Canada; Rony Bonotto; George Leary	417 pts	United States; Richard Chordash; Bret Erickson; Jay Waldron	415 pts	Cuba	396 pts
1995	United States; Bret Erickson; Lance Bade; Brian Ballard	355 pts	Canada; George Leary; John Primrose; Paul Shaw	339 pts	Colombia; Danilo Caro; Jorge Jaramillo; Andrés García Caro	334 pts

=== Double trap ===
Games	Gold	Silver	Bronze
1995	Canada	United States	Peru

=== Running Deer team ===
Games	Gold	Silver	Bronze
1955	Mexico	Venezuela	-

== Women's team ==
=== 10 metre air pistol ===
Event	Gold	Silver	Bronze
1983	United States	Venezuela	Cuba
1991	United States	Canada	Cuba
1995	United States	Colombia	Argentina

=== 10 metre air rifle ===
Games	Gold		Silver		Bronze	
1983	United States; Pat Spurgin; Wanda Jewell; Tracy Smith	1138 pts	Canada; Joelle Fefer; Christina Schulze; Jackie Terry	1096 pts	Cuba; Dania Acosta; Teresa Martinez; Irma Sánchez	1081 pts
1991	United States; Elizabeth Bourland; Launi Meili; Debra Sinclair	1172 pts	Canada; Sharon Bowes	1158 pts	Cuba; Idilvis Sanchez; Ana Z. Santiago	1153 pts
1995	United States; Elizabeth Bourland; Ann-Marie Pfiffner; Katherine Kelemen	1169 pts	Cuba; Eunice Caballero; Idilvis Sanchez; Mirelsis Rojas Martinez	1144 pts	Argentina; Amelia Fournel; Cecilia Zeid Jan; Diana Martinez	1141 pts

=== 25 metre pistol ===
Event	Gold	Silver	Bronze
1983	United States	Cuba	Venezuela
1991	Cuba	United States	Colombia
1995	United States	Cuba	Argentina

=== 50 metre rifle prone ===
Event	Gold	Silver	Bronze
1983	United States; Deena Wigger; Pat Spurgin; Tracy Smith	Cuba; Nilzer Cuba; Irma Sánchez; Dania Acosta	Canada; Joelle Fefer; Christina Schulze; Sheila MacQuarrie
1991	United States; Tammie de Angelis; Launi Meili; Michelle Scarborough	Cuba; Damilet Acosta; Ana Santiago	Brazil
1995	Argentina; Cecilia Zeid Jan; Mirta E. Libares; Diana Martinez	United States; Elizabeth Bourland; Katherine Kelemen; Wanda Jewell	Cuba; Ildivis Sanchez; M. Rojas Martinez; L. Sanchez Santana

=== 50 metre rifle three positions ===
Event	Gold	Silver	Bronze
1983	United States	Canada	Cuba
1991	United States	Cuba	Brazil
1995	United States	Cuba	Argentina
