= 1973 American Shooting Championships =

Shooting event in Mexico

- Host city: Mexico City, Mexico

The 1973 American Shooting Championships were the 1st American Shooting Championships and took place in Mexico City, Mexico.

== Medal summary ==
=== Men ===
Event	Gold	Silver	Bronze
50 m rifle 3 positions	Lones Wigger; United States	John Writer; United States	Margaret Murdock; United States
50 m rifle prone	David Boyd; United States	Olegario Vázquez Raña; Mexico	Miguel Valdes Gonzalez; Cuba
50 m standard rifle 3 positions	Boyd Goldsby; United States	Miguel Valdes Gonzalez; Cuba	Raúl Llanos; Cuba
300 m rifle 3 positions	John Writer; United States	Lones Wigger; United States	Lanny Bassham; United States
AR40M	Olegario Vázquez Raña; Mexico	Lanny Bassham; United States	Boyd Goldsby; United States
25 m rapid fire pistol	Jimmy McCauley; United States	Osvaldo Scandola; Argentina	Homero Laddaga; Mexico
25 m center fire pistol	Francis Higginson; United States	Jimmie Dorsey; United States	Jules Sobrian; Canada
25 m standard fire pistol	Donald Hadford; Canada	James Thurlow; Canada	James Lee; Canada
50 m pistol	Jules Sobrian; Canada	Hershel Anderson; United States	Santiago Trompeta; Cuba
AP40M	Hershel Anderson; United States	Francis Higginson; United States	Bertino Souza; Brazil
50 m running target	Helmut Bellingrodt; Colombia	Louis Michael Theimer; United States	Arlie Jones; United States
50 m running target mixed	Helmut Bellingrodt; Colombia	Rodolfo Rizo; Mexico	Arlie Jones; United States
Skeet	Athos Pisoni; Brazil	Mirek Switalski; Mexico	Roberto Castrillo; Cuba
Trap	Hugh Bowie; United States	Frank Little; United States	James DeFilippi; United States

=== Women ===
Event	Gold	Silver	Bronze
25 m pistol	Linda Thom; Canada	Frances Sobrian; Canada	none awarded

== Medal table ==
Rank	Nation	Gold	Silver	Bronze	Total
1	United States	8	8	6	22
2	Canada	3	2	2	7
3	Colombia	2	0	0	2
4	Mexico	1	3	1	5
5	Brazil	1	0	1	2
6	Cuba	0	1	4	5
7	Argentina	0	1	0	1
Totals (7 entries)		15	15	14	44

== See also ==
- International Confederation of Fullbore Rifle Associations
- ISSF World Shooting Championships
- USA Shooting
