= Ernesto Montemayor =

Ernesto Montemayor may refer to:

- Ernesto Montemayor Sr. (1907–?), Mexican sports shooter
- Ernesto Montemayor Jr. (1928–2000), Mexican sports shooter
