= Rubén Váldez =

Rubén Váldez may refer to:

- Rubén Váldez (sport shooter) (1923–2008), Peruvian sports shooter
- Ruben A. Valdez (1937-2019), American politician
- Rubén Óscar Valdez (born 1946), Spanish football striker
