= Luis Colina =

Luis Colina may refer to:

- Luis Colina (referee) (1888–1956), Spanish referee
- Luis Colina (shooter) (born 1941), Colombian former sports shooter
