= Alejandra Hoyos =

Colombian sports shooter (born 1964)

Personal information
- Nationality: Colombian
- Born: 17 February 1964 (age 62)

Sport
- Country: Colombia
- Sport: Shooting
Medal record
Representing Colombia
Women's shooting
Pan American Games
Bronze medal – third place	1983 Caracas	10 m air rifle

Alejandra Hoyos (born 17 February 1964) is a Colombian sports shooter. She competed in the women's 10 metre air rifle event at the 1984 Summer Olympics.
