= Connie Petracek =

American sports shooter

Personal information
- Full name: Constance Elizabeth Petracek
- Born: December 25, 1947 (age 78) Chambersburg, Pennsylvania, U.S.
- Height: 5 ft 4.5 in (164 cm)
- Weight: 123 lb (56 kg)

Sport
- Country: United States
- Sport: Sports shooting
Medal record
Pan American Games
Gold medal – first place	1995 Mar del Plata	10 m air pistol, ind.
Gold medal – first place	1995 Mar del Plata	25 m pistol, ind.
Silver medal – second place	1991 Havana	10 m air pistol, ind.

Constance Elizabeth "Connie" Petracek (born December 25, 1947) is an American sports shooter. She competed at the 1992 Summer Olympics and the 1996 Summer Olympics.
