= Wanda Jewell =

American sports shooter

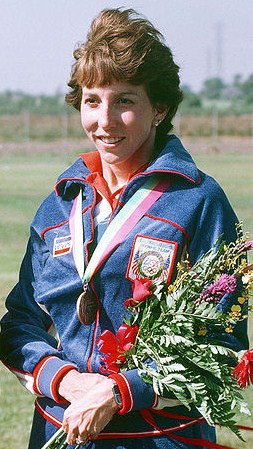
- Jewell at the 1984 Summer Olympics

Personal information
- Full name: Wanda Rae Jewell
- Born: June 19, 1954 (age 72) Havre, Montana, U.S.
Medal record
Women's shooting
Representing the United States
Olympic Games
Bronze medal – third place	1984 Los Angeles	50 m rifle 3 pos.
Pan American Games
Gold medal – first place	1983 Caracas	50 m rifle 3 pos., ind.
Silver medal – second place	1983 Caracas	10 m air rifle, ind.
Bronze medal – third place	1995 Mar del Plata	50 m rifle 3 pos., ind.

Wanda Rae Jewell (born June 19, 1954) is an American former sports shooter and Olympic bronze medalist. At the 1984 Summer Olympics in Los Angeles, California, she won a bronze medal in the women's standard small-bore rifle (three positions at 50 metres). At the 1988 Summer Olympics, she tied for 13th place in the same event.
