= Luis Ortiz (sport shooter) =

Colombian sports shooter

Personal information
- Full name: Luis Carlos Ortiz
- Nationality: Colombia
- Born: 12 January 1951 (age 75)

Sport
- Sport: Shooting
Medal record
Representing Colombia
Men's shooting
Pan American Games
Bronze medal – third place	1983 Caracas	10 m air pistol

Luis Ortiz (born 12 January 1951) is a Colombian sports shooter. He competed in the men's 50 metre free pistol event at the 1984 Summer Olympics.
