= Alfredo González (sport shooter) =

Colombian sports shooter (born 1944)

Personal information
- Nationality: Colombia
- Born: 23 February 1944 (age 82)

Sport
- Sport: Shooting
Medal record
Representing Colombia
Men's shooting
Event	1st	2nd	3rd
Pan American Games	1	1	3
Total	1	1	3
Pan American Games
Gold medal – first place	1987 Indianapolis	25 m rapid fire pistol team
Silver medal – second place	1983 Caracas	25 m standard pistol team
Bronze medal – third place	1979 San Juan	25 m rapid fire pistol team
Bronze medal – third place	1983 Caracas	25 m rapid fire pistol team
Bronze medal – third place	1991 Havana	25 m rapid fire pistol team

Alfredo González (born 23 February 1944) is a Colombian sports shooter. He competed at the 1976 Summer Olympics, the 1984 Summer Olympics and the 1988 Summer Olympics.
