= Bernardo Tovar =

Colombian sport shooter (born 1951)

Personal information
- Full name: Bernardo Tobar Ante
- Born: 5 January 1951 (age 75) Popayán, Colombia
- Height: 1.71 m (5 ft 7 1/2 in)
- Weight: 81 kg (179 lb)

Sport
- Country: Colombia
- Sport: Shooting
Medal record
Representing Colombia
Men's shooting
Event	1st	2nd	3rd
World Championships	1	0	0
World Cup	5	3	3
Pan American Games	3	2	7
Total	9	5	10
World Championships
Gold medal – first place	1990 Moscow	10 m air pistol
World Cup
Gold medal – first place	1986 Zürich	10 m air pistol
Gold medal – first place	1990 Rio de Janeiro	10 m air pistol
Gold medal – first place	1992 Los Angeles	25 m rapid fire pistol
Gold medal – first place	1992 Los Angeles	50 m pistol
Gold medal – first place	1995 Havana	25 m rapid fire pistol
Silver medal – second place	1986 Mexico city	25 m rapid fire pistol
Silver medal – second place	1990 Mexico City	25 m rapid fire pistol
Silver medal – second place	1992 Mexico City	10 m air pistol
Bronze medal – third place	1989 Mexico City	25 m rapid fire pistol
Bronze medal – third place	1990 Suhl	25 m rapid fire pistol
Bronze medal – third place	1996 Havana	50 m pistol
Pan American Games
Gold medal – first place	1987 Indianapolis	25 m rapid fire pistol
Gold medal – first place	1987 Indianapolis	25 m rapid fire pistol team
Gold medal – first place	1991 Havana	10 m air pistol
Silver medal – second place	1983 Caracas	25 m rapid fire pistol
Silver medal – second place	1983 Caracas	25 m standard pistol team
Bronze medal – third place	1979 San Juan	25 m rapid fire pistol
Bronze medal – third place	1979 San Juan	25 m rapid fire pistol team
Bronze medal – third place	1983 Caracas	25 m rapid fire pistol team
Bronze medal – third place	1987 Indianapolis	50 m pistol
Bronze medal – third place	1991 Havana	25 m rapid fire pistol team
Bronze medal – third place	1995 Mar del Plata	25 m rapid fire pistol
Bronze medal – third place	1999 Winnipeg	25 m rapid fire pistol

Bernardo Tobar Ante (born 5 January 1951 in Popayán) is a Colombian former sport shooter who competed in the 1984 Summer Olympics, in the 1988 Summer Olympics, in the 1992 Summer Olympics, and in the 1996 Summer Olympics.

Olympic Games
Preceded by Jorge Molina	Flagbearer for Colombia; Barcelona 1992	Succeeded by Marlon Pérez Arango
