= Andrés Felipe Torres =

Colombian sports shooter

Personal information
- Full name: Andrés Felipe Torres Vidal
- Born: 13 March 1975 (age 51) Palmira, Colombia

Sport
- Country: Colombia
- Sport: Shooting
Medal record
Representing Colombia
Men's shooting
Event	1st	2nd	3rd
World Cup Final	0	1	0
World Cup	1	2	1
Junior World Championships	0	0	1
Pan American Games	1	1	2
Total	2	4	4
World Cup Final
Silver medal – second place	1999 Munich	10 m running target
World Cup
Gold medal – first place	1996 Havana	10 m running target
Silver medal – second place	1999 Seoul	10 m running target
Silver medal – second place	2001 Seoul	10 m running target
Bronze medal – third place	1997 Havana	10 m running target
Pan American Games
Gold medal – first place	1995 Mar del Plata	10 m running target mixed
Silver medal – second place	2003 Santo Domingo	10 m running target
Bronze medal – third place	1995 Mar del Plata	10 m running target
Bronze medal – third place	1999 Winnipeg	10 m running target
Junior World Championships
Bronze medal – third place	1994 Milan	50 m running target

Andrés Felipe Torres (born 13 March 1975 in Palmira) is a Colombian sports shooter. He competed in the men's 10 metre running target event at the 2000 Summer Olympics.
