= Lorena Guado =

Argentine sports shooter (born 1973)

Personal information
- Full name: Lorena Vanesa Guado Somaruga
- Nationality: Argentine
- Born: 26 October 1973 (age 52)

Sport
- Country: Argentina
- Sport: Sports shooting
Medal record
Pan American Games
Silver medal – second place	1995 Mar del Plata	10 m air pistol, ind.
Bronze medal – third place	1995 Mar del Plata	25 m pistol, ind.

Lorena Vanesa Guado Somaruga (Note: In this Spanish name, the first or paternal surname is Guado and the second or maternal family name is Somaruga.) (born 26 October 1973) is an Argentine sports shooter. She competed in two events at the 1996 Summer Olympics.
