= Rubén Vega (sport shooter) =

Cuban sports shooter (born 1944)

Personal information
- Nationality: Cuban
- Born: 8 August 1944 (age 80)

Sport
- Sport: Sports shooting

Rubén Vega (born 8 August 1944) is a Cuban sports shooter. He competed in the mixed skeet event at the 1976 Summer Olympics.
