= Milton Sobocinski =

Brazilian sports shooter (born 1934)

Personal information
- Born: 13 February 1934 (age 92)

Sport
- Sport: Sports shooting

Milton Enzo Sobocinski Marcondes (born 13 February 1934) is a Brazilian former sports shooter. He competed in the 50 metre rifle, three positions and the 50 metre rifle, prone events at the 1956 Summer Olympics.
