= Rojelio Arredondo =

American sport shooter (born 1950)

Rojelio "Ray" Arredondo (born September 21, 1950) is an American former sport shooter who competed in the 1988 Summer Olympics. He was born in Hidalgo County, Texas.
