= Daniel Puckel =

American sports shooter (1932–2018)

Personal information
- Born: December 28, 1932 Moline, Illinois, United States
- Died: November 13, 2018 (aged 85)

Sport
- Sport: Sports shooting

Daniel Puckel (December 28, 1932 – November 13, 2018) was an American sports shooter. He competed in three events at the 1960 Summer Olympics.
