= Alberto Martijena =

Argentine sports shooter (1906–1988)

Personal information
- Born: 15 November 1906
- Died: 5 June 1988 (aged 81)

Sport
- Sport: Sports shooting

Alberto Martijena (15 November 1906 – 5 June 1988) was an Argentine sports shooter. He competed in the 50 metre pistol event at the 1956 Summer Olympics. He also won three silver medals at the Pan American Games.
