= William Hare (sport shooter) =

Canadian sports shooter (1935–2005)

Personal information
- Born: 14 May 1935; Ottawa, Ontario, Canada
- Died: 15 January 2005 (aged 69); Irricana, Alberta, Canada

Sport
- Sport: Sports shooting

William Hare (14 May 1935 – 15 January 2005) was a Canadian sports shooter. He competed at the 1964, 1968 and 1972 Summer Olympics.
