= Arturo Costa =

Cuban sports shooter (born 1945)

Personal information
- Born: 10 December 1945 (age 80) Havana, Cuba

Sport
- Sport: Sports shooting

Arturo Costa (born 10 December 1945) is a Cuban former sports shooter. He competed at the 1968 Summer Olympics and the 1972 Summer Olympics.
