= Debra Sinclair =

American sports shooter

Personal information
- Born: March 11, 1969 (age 56); Portland, Oregon, United States

Sport
- Sport: Sports shooting

Debra Sinclair (born March 11, 1969) is an American sports shooter. She competed in the women's 10 metre air rifle event at the 1992 Summer Olympics.
