= Delfin Gómez =

Cuban sports shooter (born 1928)

Personal information
- Full name: Delfín Gómez Pérez
- Born: 25 December 1928 Havana, Cuba

Sport
- Sport: Sports shooting

Delfin Gómez (born 25 December 1928) is a Cuban former sports shooter. He competed in the skeet event at the 1968 Summer Olympics.
