= Elizabeth Bourland =

Sports shooter

Personal information
- Born: August 13, 1963 (age 62) San José, Costa Rica

Sport
- Sport: Sport shooting
Medal record
Representing United States
Pan American Games
Gold medal – first place	1991 Havana	10m air rifle team
Gold medal – first place	1995 Mar del Plata	10m air rifle
Silver medal – second place	1995 Mar del Plata	50m rifle prone

Elizabeth Bourland (née Jagush; born August 13, 1963) is a sport shooter who has competed for Costa Rica and the United States in international events. She participated in the Summer Olympics in 1984 for Costa Rica and 1996 for the United States.

== Olympic results ==
Event	1984	1996
10 metre air rifle (women)	32nd	T-13th
50 metre rifle three positions (women)	—	7th
