= David Schiaffino =

Argentine sports shooter

Personal information
- Born: 28 May 1913
- Died: 16 December 2005 (aged 92)

Sport
- Sport: Sports shooting

David Schiaffino (28 May 1913 – 16 December 2005) was an Argentine sports shooter. He competed at the 1948 Summer Olympics and 1952 Summer Olympics.
