= Marcos José Olsen =

Brazilian sports shooter (born 1937)

Personal information
- Born: 30 October 1937 (age 88) Canoinhas, Brazil

Sport
- Sport: Sports shooting

Marcos José Olsen (born 30 October 1937) is a Brazilian former sports shooter. He competed at the 1972, 1976, 1980 and the 1984 Summer Olympics.
