= Diego Arcay =

Venezuelan sports shooter (born 1944)

Personal information
- Nationality: Venezuelan
- Born: 10 October 1944 (age 80)

Sport
- Sport: Sports shooting

Diego Arcay (born 10 October 1944) is a Venezuelan sports shooter. He competed in the mixed trap event at the 1984 Summer Olympics.
