= Carlos Zarzar =

Chilean sports shooter

Personal information
- Nationality: Chilean
- Born: 23 February 1955 (age 70)

Sport
- Sport: Sports shooting

Carlos Zarzar (born 23 February 1955) is a Chilean sports shooter. He competed in the mixed skeet event at the 1984 Summer Olympics.
