= Miguel Valdes =

Cuban sports shooter (born 1940)

Personal information
- Born: 29 June 1940 (age 86)

Sport
- Sport: Sports shooting

Miguel Valdes (born 29 June 1940) is a Cuban former sports shooter. He competed at the 1972, 1976 and the 1980 Summer Olympics.
