= Firmo Roberti =

Argentine sport shooter

Personal information
- Born: 4 February 1943 (age 83)

Sport
- Sport: Sports shooting

Firmo Roberti (born 4 February 1943) is an Argentine former sport shooter who competed in the 1972 Summer Olympics, in the 1976 Summer Olympics, in the 1984 Summer Olympics, in the 1988 Summer Olympics, and in the 1992 Summer Olympics.

== See also ==
- List of athletes with the most appearances at Olympic Games
