= Nelson Oñate =

Cuban sports shooter (1943–2022)

Personal information
- Born: 7 March 1943 Havana, Cuba
- Died: 11 September 2022 (aged 79) Miami, Florida, U.S.

Sport
- Sport: Sports shooting

Nelson Oñate (7 March 1943 – 11 September 2022) was a Cuban sports shooter. He competed in the 50 metre pistol event at the 1968 Summer Olympics.
