= Javier Peregrina =

Mexican sports shooter

Personal information
- Full name: Javier Peregrina González
- Born: 21 May 1932 (age 94) Guadalajara, Mexico
- Died: Zapopan, Jalisco

Sport
- Country: Mexico
- Sport: Sports shooting

Javier Peregrina (born 21 May 1932) is a Mexican former sports shooter. He competed in the 50 metre pistol event at the 1968 Summer Olympics.
