= Tony Rosetti =

American sports shooter

Personal information
- Born: December 11, 1945 (age 80) Biloxi, Mississippi, United States

Sport
- Sport: Sports shooting

Tony Rosetti (born December 11, 1945) is an American former sports shooter. He competed in the skeet event at the 1972 Summer Olympics.
