= Raúl Ibarra =

Mexican sports shooter (1908–2002)

Personal information
- Born: 6 April 1908 Campeche, Mexico
- Died: 18 July 2002 (aged 94)

Sport
- Sport: Sports shooting

Raúl Ibarra (6 April 1908 – 18 July 2002) was a Mexican sports shooter. He competed at the 1952, 1956, 1960 and 1964 Summer Olympics.
