= John McNally (sport shooter) =

American sports shooter

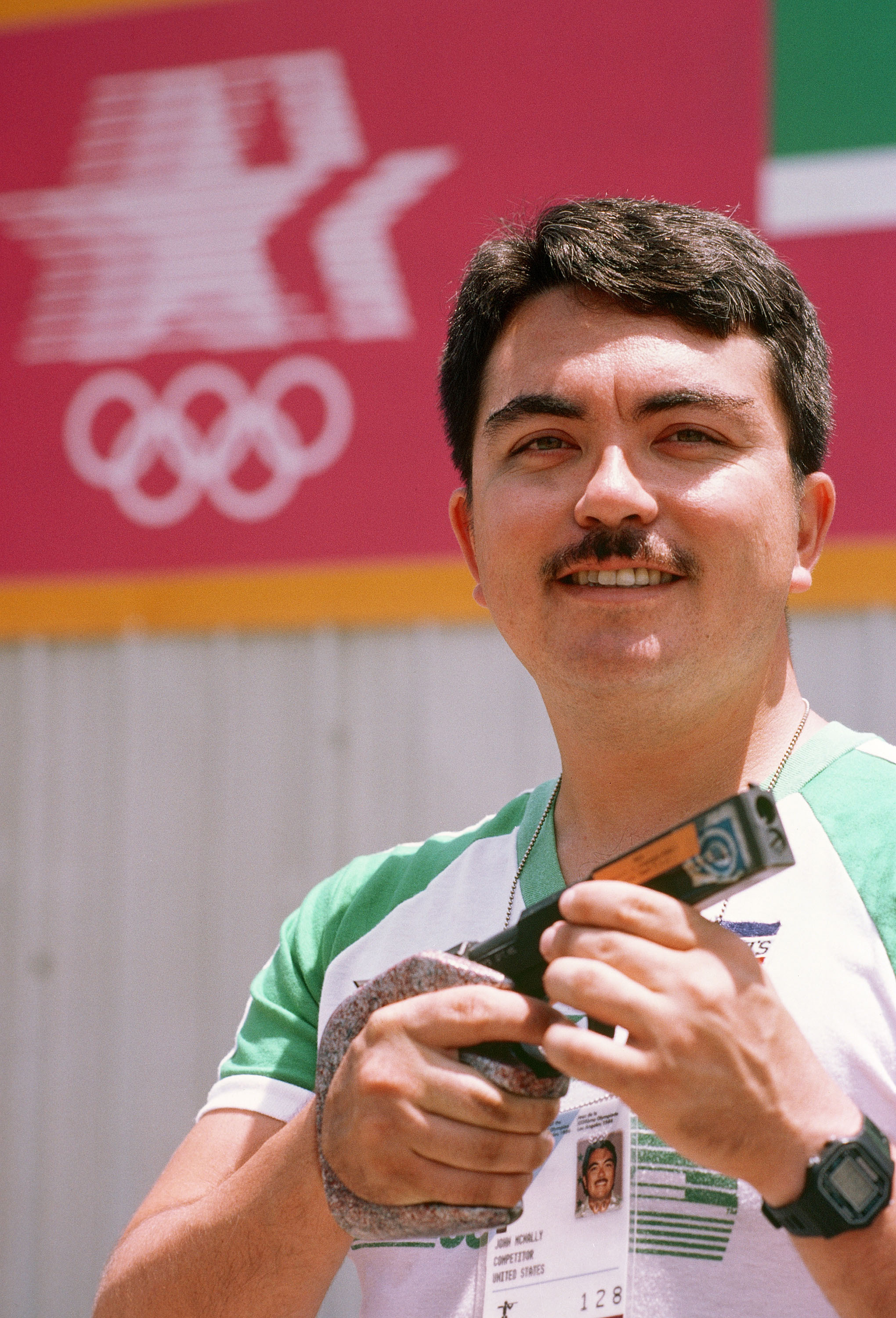
- McNally in 1984

Personal information
- Born: January 20, 1956 (age 70) Okinawa Prefecture, Japan
- Home town: Dallas, Texas, United States

Sport
- Sport: Shooting sports
Medal record
Representing United States
Pan American Games
Gold medal – first place	1983 Caracas	25m pistol team
Gold medal – first place	1991 Havana	25m pistol
Gold medal – first place	1991 Havana	25m pistol team
Gold medal – first place	1995 Mar del Plata	25m pistol team
Silver medal – second place	1979 San Juan	25m pistol
Silver medal – second place	1979 San Juan	25m pistol team
Silver medal – second place	1987 Indianapolis	25m pistol team
Silver medal – second place	1999 Winnipeg	25m pistol
Bronze medal – third place	1987 Indianapolis	25m pistol
Bronze medal – third place	2003 Santo Domingo	25m pistol

John Tsuyshi McNally (born January 20, 1956) is an American former sport shooter of Japanese descent who competed in the 1984, 1988, 1992, 1996, and 2000 Summer Olympics.
