= Barney Hartman =

Canadian sport shooter

Bernard "Barney" Conrad Hartman (2 November 1916 – 30 October 2016) was a world champion skeet shooter, National Skeet Shooting Association Hall of Fame Inductee, Canadian Sports Hall of Famer, and recipient of the Order of Canada. Hartman is the author of Hartman on Skeet, a 1967 instructional book published by McLellan and Stewart referred to as "the definitive book on skeet."

== Life and career ==
Bernard "Barney" Conrad Hartman was born in Swan River, Manitoba on 2 November 1916. Growing up on farms, he learned to hunt to help feed his family during the Great Depression.

In 1938, only one year before Canada entered World War II, Hartman joined the Royal Canadian Air Force as an aero-engine mechanic. Without a university degree, his desire to fly Spitfires could not be realized until two years later when Canada lifted education restrictions for pilots, to help with the war effort. Hartman scored so highly on his flight tests that he was made an instructor for the RCAF for the war's duration in Saskatoon, Saskatchewan. Hartman stayed in the RCAF until mandatory retirement 25 years later, flying Search and Rescue flights out of Goose Bay, Labrador.

Hartman began skeet shooting while stationed in Goose Bay, Labrador, winning his first competition in 1949. Between 1957 and 1962, Hartman captured seven consecutive amateur Canadian Skeet Shooting Championships and placed first or second in a number of categories in the NSSA World Skeet Shooting Championships. Hartman won the bronze medal at the 1959 Pan Am Games and again at the 1963 Pan Am Games. In 1963 Harman captured both the Canadian and World Championships. Hartman was named captain of the all-American National Skeet Shooting Association (NSSA) ten times in the sixteen years that he was a member. He has held or tied almost 30 world titles in 12, 20, 28, .410 gauge and all-around categories.

Hartman's consistent performance in the world of skeet shooting earned him the nickname The Shooting Machine and Mechanical Man. In 1963, he was known to have smashed 2002 consecutive birds. Hartman was inducted into eight sports halls of fame including: the American Skeet Shooting Hall of Fame; Canadian Armed Forces Sports Hall of Fame; Canadian Sports Hall of Fame; Ottawa Sport Hall of Fame; Manitoba Sports Hall of Fame and the Recreation Association's (R.A. Centre) Hall of Fame Sports Award.

In 1960, Hartman was featured in the O'Keefe Great Achievements in Sports series.

He died in 2016, just 2 days shy of his 100th birthday.
