= José Reyes Rodríguez =

Mexican sports shooter

Personal information
- Born: 4 January 1906

Sport
- Sport: Sports shooting

José Reyes Rodríguez (born 4 January 1906, date of death unknown) was a Mexican sports shooter. He competed at the 1948 Summer Olympics and 1952 Summer Olympics.
