= David Ross (sport shooter) =

American sports shooter

Personal information
- Born: November 16, 1940 (age 85) New York, New York, United States

Sport
- Sport: Sports shooting

David Ross (born November 16, 1940) is an American sports shooter. He competed in the men's 50 metre rifle, prone event at the 1976 Summer Olympics.
