= Antonio Ando =

Argentine sports shooter

Antonio Andó
Personal information
- Born: 27 August 1914 Buenos Aires, Argentina

Sport
- Country: Argentina
- Sport: Sports shooting

Antonio Andó (born 27 August 1914, date of death unknown) was an Argentine sports shooter. He competed in the 50 m rifle event at the 1948 Summer Olympics.
