= Daniel Carlisle =

American sports shooter (born 1955)

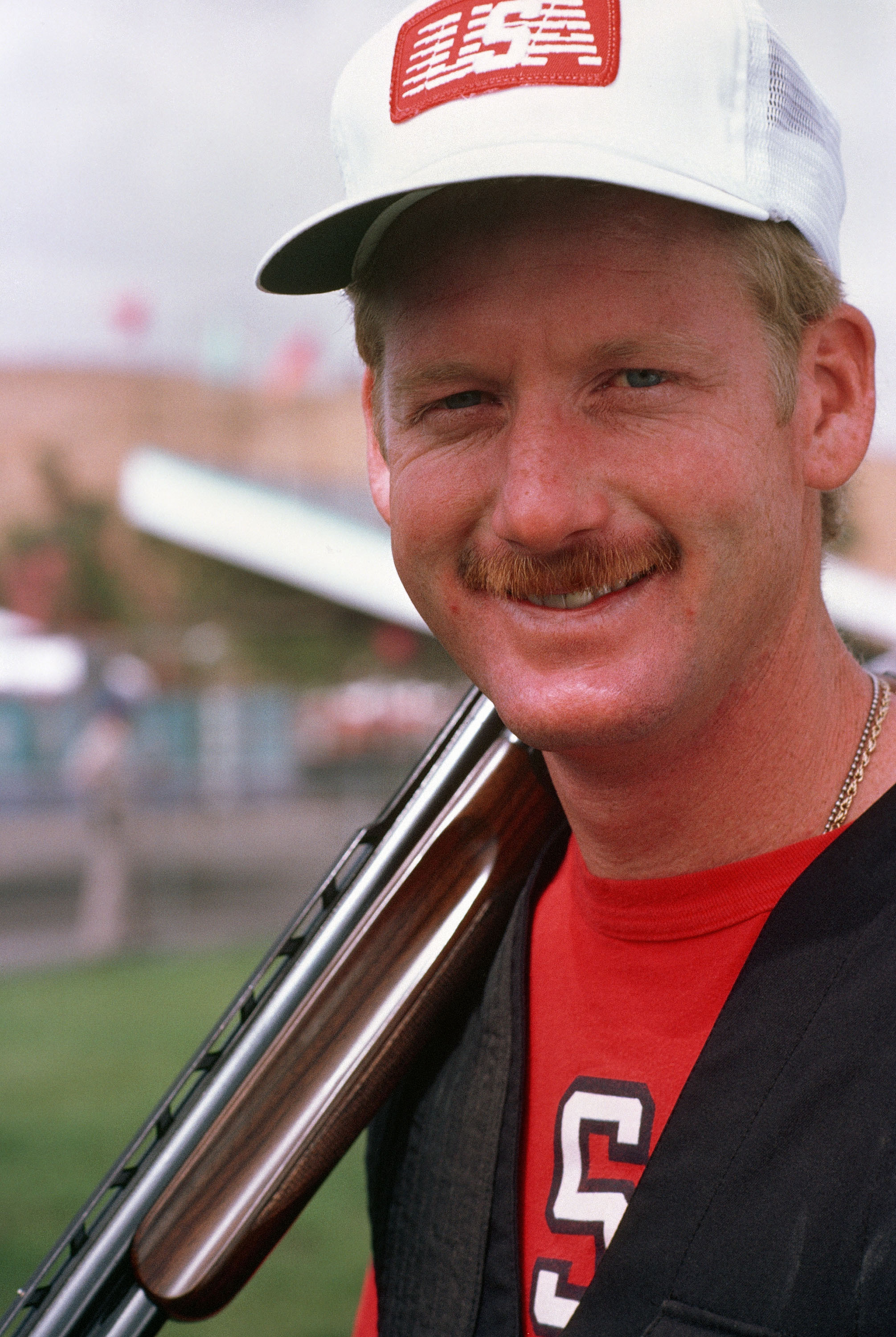
- Carlisle in 1984

Personal information
- Born: December 14, 1955 (age 70) Houston, Texas, USA
Medal record
Men's shooting
Representing the United States
Olympic Games
Bronze medal – third place	1984 Los Angeles	Trap

Daniel Thomas Carlisle (born December 14, 1955, in Houston, Texas) is a former American sports shooter and Olympic bronze medalist. At the 1984 Summer Olympics in Los Angeles, California, he won a bronze medal in the men's trap competition. At the 1988 Summer Olympics, he placed 9th in the trap competition and 4th in the skeet competition.
