= Alf Mayer (sport shooter) =

Canadian sports shooter (1938–2021)

Personal information
- Full name: Alfons Mayer
- Born: 1 February 1938 Weiler im Allgäu, Germany
- Died: 2 November 2021 (aged 83) Kitchener, Ontario, Canada

Sport
- Sport: Sports shooting

Alfons Mayer (1 February 1938 – 2 November 2021) was a Canadian sports shooter. He competed at the 1968 Summer Olympics and the 1972 Summer Olympics.

Mayer died in Kitchener, Ontario on 2 November 2021, at the age of 83.
