= Scott Swinney =

American sports shooter

Personal information
- Nationality: American
- Born: December 6, 1968 (age 57)

Sport
- Sport: Sports shooting

Scott Swinney (born December 6, 1968) is an American sports shooter. He competed in the men's 50 metre running target event at the 1988 Summer Olympics.
