= Luis Colina (shooter) =

Colombian sport shooter (born 1941)

Personal information
- Full name: Luis Carlos Colina
- Nationality: Colombia
- Born: 29 June 1941 (age 85)
- Height: 170 cm (5 ft 7 in)
- Weight: 67 kg (148 lb)

Sport
- Sport: Shooting
Medal record
Representing Colombia
Men's shooting
Event	1st	2nd	3rd
Pan American Games	1	1	3
Total	1	1	3
Pan American Games
Gold medal – first place	1987 Indianapolis	25 m rapid fire pistol team
Silver medal – second place	1983 Caracas	25 m standard pistol team
Bronze medal – third place	1979 San Juan	25 m rapid fire pistol team
Bronze medal – third place	1983 Caracas	25 m rapid fire pistol team
Bronze medal – third place	1991 Havana	25 m rapid fire pistol team

Luis Colina (born 29 June 1941) is a Colombian former sports shooter. He competed in the 25 metre pistol event at the 1972 Summer Olympics and finished with rank 40.
