= Charvin Dixon =

American sports shooter (born 1954)

Personal information
- Born: September 19, 1954 (age 71) Nogales, Arizona, United States

Sport
- Sport: Sports shooting

Charvin Dixon (born September 19, 1954) is an American sports shooter. He competed in the mixed trap event at the 1976 Summer Olympics.
