= Raúl Llanos =

Cuban sports shooter (born 1949)

Personal information
- Born: 23 January 1949 (age 77) Havana, Cuba

Sport
- Sport: Sports shooting

Raúl Llanos (born 23 January 1949) is a Cuban former sports shooter. He competed at the 1968 Summer Olympics and the 1972 Summer Olympics.
