= David Johnson (sport shooter) =

American sports shooter

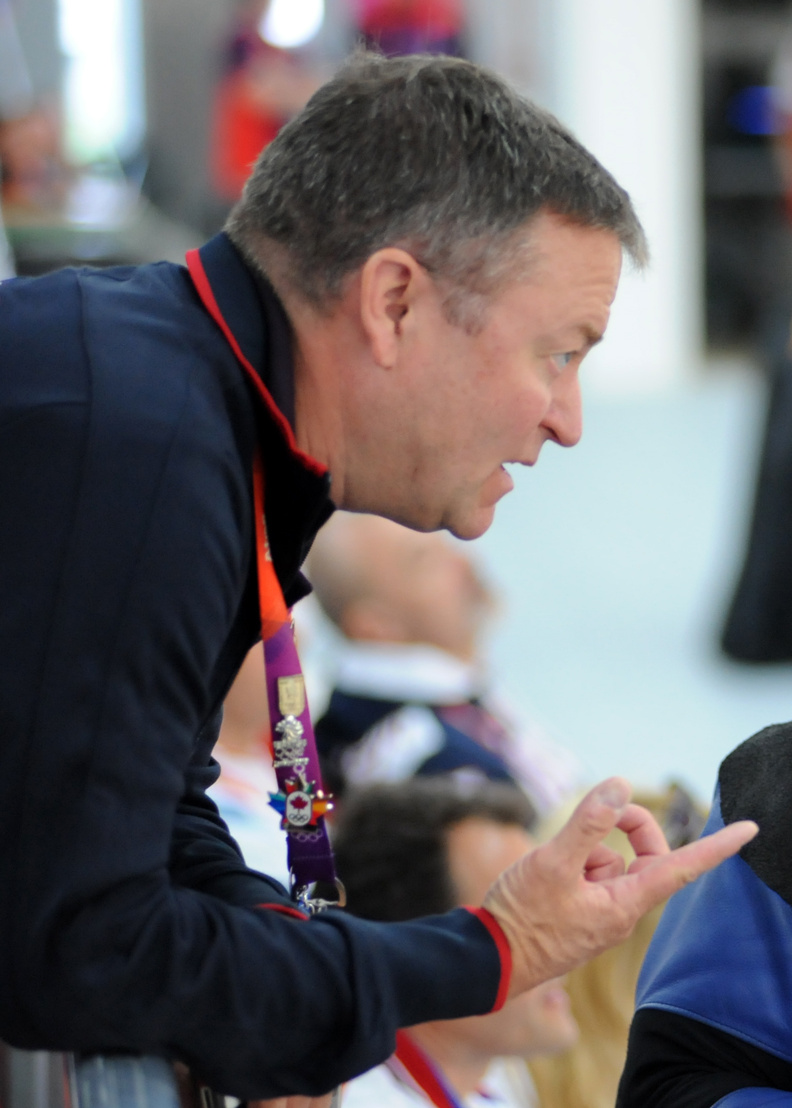
- Johnson at the 2012 Olympics

Personal information
- Full name: David Alan Johnson
- Nationality: American
- Born: May 29, 1964 (age 62) Mount Holly, New Jersey, U.S.
- Height: 5 ft 6.5 in (169 cm)
- Weight: 150 lb (68 kg)

Sport
- Sport: Sports shooting
Medal record
Men's shooting
Representing United States
Pan American Games
Gold medal – first place	1991 Havana	10 m air rifle
Silver medal – second place	1983 Caracas	10 m air rifle
Silver medal – second place	1995 Mar del Plata	50 m rifle 3 positions

David Alan Johnson (born May 29, 1964) is an American rifle shooter who won a gold medal in the 10 m air rifle at the 1991 Pan American Games. Next year he competed at the same event at the 1992 Olympics and finished in 11th place.

Johnson started training in shooting in 1972 at the Langley Junior rifle club in Virginia, and continued through his graduation from Hampton High School in 1982. In 1986, he earned a Bachelor of Science degree in finance from West Virginia University. After graduation, he joined the U.S. Army Reserves and became a member of the marksmanship unit. Since early 2000s he trained the National Rifle Team, preparing it for the 2004, 2008 and 2012 Olympics.
