= Carlos Hora =

Peruvian sports shooter (born 1945)

Personal information
- Nationality: Peruvian
- Born: 1 September 1945 (age 79)

Sport
- Sport: Sport shooting

Carlos Hora (born 1 September 1945) is a Peruvian sport shooter. He competed at the 1980 Summer Olympics, the 1984 Summer Olympics and the 1988 Summer Olympics.
