= Agustin Rangel =

Venezuelan sports shooter (1925–2012)

Agustín Rangel
Personal information
- Full name: Agustín Laureano Rangel Castillo
- Born: 5 May 1925
- Died: 30 October 2012 (aged 87) Porlamar, Venezuela

Sport
- Sport: Sports shooting

Agustín Rangel (5 May 1925 – 30 October 2012) was a Venezuelan sports shooter. He competed at the 1964 Summer Olympics and the 1972 Summer Olympics.
