= Hezekiah Leonard Clark Jr. =

U.S. non-commissioned military officer

- Born: Hezekiah Leonard Clark Jr. September 13, 1937; New Orleans, Louisiana
- Died: September 27, 2023 (aged 86); New Orleans, Louisiana
- Military career
- Allegiance: United States of America
- Branch: United States Marine Corps; United States Army
- Rank: Master sergeant
- Conflicts: Korean War; Vietnam War
- Awards: Army Drill Sergeant Badge Bronze Star Medal; Meritorious Service Medal; Air Medal; Commendation Medal; Armed Forces Honor Medal; Valorous Unit Award; Gallantry Cross (Vietnam); Good Conduct Medal(2); National Defense Service Medal; Vietnam Service Medal; Vietnam Campaign Medal; Civil Actions Medal; Meritorious Unit Commendation Combat Infantryman Badge

Hezekiah Leonard Clark Jr. (September 13, 1937 – September 27, 2023) was an American veteran of the United States Marine Corps and the United States Army who served during the Korean War and Vietnam War eras. He was a champion marksman, and as of 2014, one of only thirty-four triple-distinguished shooters: Distinguished Rifleman, Distinguished Pistol Shot, and Distinguished International Shooter.

== Early life ==
Hezekiah Leonard Clark Jr. was born on September 13, 1937, in New Orleans, Louisiana. He attended Walter L. Cohen High School, New Orleans, Louisiana. Furthering his education, he attended American University, Washington, D.C., University of Maryland, Baltimore, Maryland, Northwestern State University, Natchitoches Parish, Louisiana and Our Lady of Holy Cross College, New Orleans, Louisiana, earning undergraduate degrees. He received his master's degree in Criminal Justice from Loyola University, New Orleans, Louisiana.

Clark graduated from the U.S. Department of Justice, Drug Enforcement School, New Orleans, Louisiana and the U.S. Department of Defense, Race Relations Institute, Patrick Air Force Base, Cape Canaveral, Florida. He graduated from the National Institute of Insurance Claims Adjusters, and is a graduate fellow of the Institute of Politics of Loyola University, New Orleans, Louisiana. He served as an adjunct professor at Ohio State University, Columbus, Ohio, Central State University, Xenia, Ohio, Kent State University, Kent, Ohio, University of Akron, Akron, Ohio, and University of Toledo, Toledo, Ohio.

== Sports ==
Clark enjoyed participating in track and field, judo, karate, boxing and shooting. His shooting career started on a unit rifle range in 1961, and two months later he won the U.S. Marine Corps Rifle Championship. He participated in numerous Rifle and Pistol shooting competitions, earning 57 National and World Pistol Records, many Rifle and Pistol State Championships, Regional, Service, and Inter Service Championships, U.S. Army Pistol Champion, U.S. National Pistol Champion, and International Championship.

He was a member of the 1972 Olympic gold-medallist teams in free pistol and centre fire pistol and was silver medallist in the centrefire pistol individual competition. Clark was the only triple medallist for the USA Marksmen. He won the U.S. Marine Corps Rifle Team Championship (Lloyd Trophy) and tied the Marine match record for 600 yards. Of national records kept since 1882, as of 2014 he is one of only 34 to reach the august position of triple distinguished shooter, for Rifle, Pistol and International competitions.

Clark won the President's Hundred Tab in both rifle and pistol competition. He achieved the Lifetime Super Masters Classification. SFC Hezekiah Clark, who was assigned to the Army's famed Marksmanship Training Unit at Fort Benning, Georgia, was described as "the hottest gun on the pistol circuit" after his victory in the International Centre Fire Pistol Match, where he fired a very credible 592 out of 600 points in the dual- stage event.

SFC Hezekiah Clark of New Orleans, Louisiana, snatched the lead in the Mid-Winter Pistol Champions at the Tampa Police Range. He won all three matches that he entered that year, posting 1,769 points of a possible 1,800 in eight matches. SFC Hezekiah Clark of New Orleans, Louisiana, refused to fold under pressure and captured the 35th annual Mid-Winter Championship, moving ahead of a star -studded field of 269 of the country's best pistol shooters. He chalked up a two-day total of 2,655 points of a possible 2,700.

Clark received a letter of congratulations on August 16, 1969, from James E. Fitzmorris Jr., Lieutenant Governor of the State of Louisiana, having earned the rating of Master Shooter, the highest rating of the National Rifle Association of America (NRA), and being a member of the United States World Championship Team.

On September 2, 1969, he received a letter of congratulations from Louis F. Lucas, Executive Director of the National Rifle Association, for achieving membership in the exclusive NRA "2650 Club". He is a Legion of Honor Member of the National Rifle Association, and held NRA credentials as a Certified Instructor in Home Firearm Safety, Pistol, Rifle, and Shotgun. Clark is a life member of the United States of America Shooting Team Alumni Association.

== National and world awards ==
Clark set an array of national records in National Rifle Association sanctioned tournaments in the .22 caliber team, center fire team, 45 caliber team, standard pistol team, service pistol team, center fire pistol team, standard fire pistol team, and air pistol. Clark also earned several world champion titles, in the .22 Caliber Standard Pistol, Center Fire Pistol, and Military Rapid Fire Pistol.

== Military career ==
Clark served in the United States Marine Corps and the United States Army during both the Korean War and the Vietnam War eras. He was the recipient of the Bronze Star, Meritorious Service Medal, Air Medal, U.S. Army Commendation Medal and U.S. Navy/Marine Corps Commendation Medal, Vietnam Service Medal, Valorous Unit Award, the Gallantry Cross (Vietnam), U.S. Army Good Conduct Medal, U.S. Marine Corps Good Conduct Medal, National Defense Service Medal, Vietnam Service Medal, Vietnam Campaign Medal, Vietnam Civil Actions Unit Citation, Meritorious Unit Commendation, Combat Infantryman Badge, and Drill Sergeant Badge. He received multiples of more than half of the above listed awards.

== Fraternal organizations ==
Clark achieved the rank of Grand Inspector General 33rd Degree Mason (Class of 1970). He is a member of the Ancient Egyptian Arabic Order Nobles Mystic Shrine of North and South America and Its Jurisdictions, Inc. (AEAONMS). He was also Worshipful Master-Phoenix Lodge #226, District Worshipful Master of the Year, District #1 and Assistant District Deputy Grand Master, District #9, of Louisiana. Under the authority of Sovereign Grand Commander Southern Jurisdiction JNO G. Lewis Jr., Grand Master of Louisiana, he served as the Senior Positioned Mason in the country of Vietnam, that of elected president of Beehive Masonic Study Club.

Clark was inducted into the New South Wales (Australia) Masonic Club, President Commanders of the Rite 33rd Degree, S.E. Louisiana Region, and Most Excellent High Priest, Bright Star Chapter #20. Established and Charter Eminent Commander of Hezekiah L. Clark Jr. Commandery #9. A couple of years later it became known as Nile Commandery #9.

He was Imperial Director, Temple Supervision, Shriner, President of Leesville Louisiana Shrine Club, Shrine Director Louisiana State Creation Team and Shrine Promotional Director for Louisiana.

Clark was Worthy Patron, Herion Chapter #71, Order of the Eastern Star, Worthy Patron, Phoenix Chapter #172, O.E.S., Associate Royal Patron, Alma Gilliam Chapter #14, Amaranth Court, Assistant Director Royal Council #11, Knights of Pythagoras, Board of Governors Phoenix Council #17, Knights of Pythagoras and a member of The Phylaxis Society (International Masonic Education Society).

== Other affiliations ==
Clark was a member of the American Legion Post #588, and a member of the United States Junior Chamber of Commerce (JC's), where he served as Internal Vice President and External Vice President. He attained the rank of Life Scout, Boy Scouts of America and he was Junior Assistant Scout Master, Troop #132, New Orleans, Louisiana. He is a member of the Disabled American Veterans (DAV) Post #15.

He was elected to The Democratic Executive Committee, District "E", and the president of the 9th Ward Citizen Voters League in his hometown of New Orleans, Louisiana, and National Who's Who in the Lodging Industry. He is a lifetime member of the Montford Point U.S. Marine Association (MAL). Clark was a Louisiana State Commissioner Stress Analysts Board Member (Lie Detection), and a member of both the National and International Societies of Stress Analysts.

During his employment as a member of the District Attorney's Staff of New Orleans, Louisiana, he also was a member of the Board of Directors, Louisiana District Attorney's Association Investigators Department. In addition, Clark held the Rank of Colonel on the Governor's Staff.

He conceived and produced a weekly children's T.V. program on both local and cable channels titled "Thursday Night Variety Show," in the Leesville, Louisiana, viewing area.

Clark was a lifetime member of the National Organization of Black Law Enforcement Executives (NOBLE).
