= Terence Anderson (sport shooter) =

American sports shooter

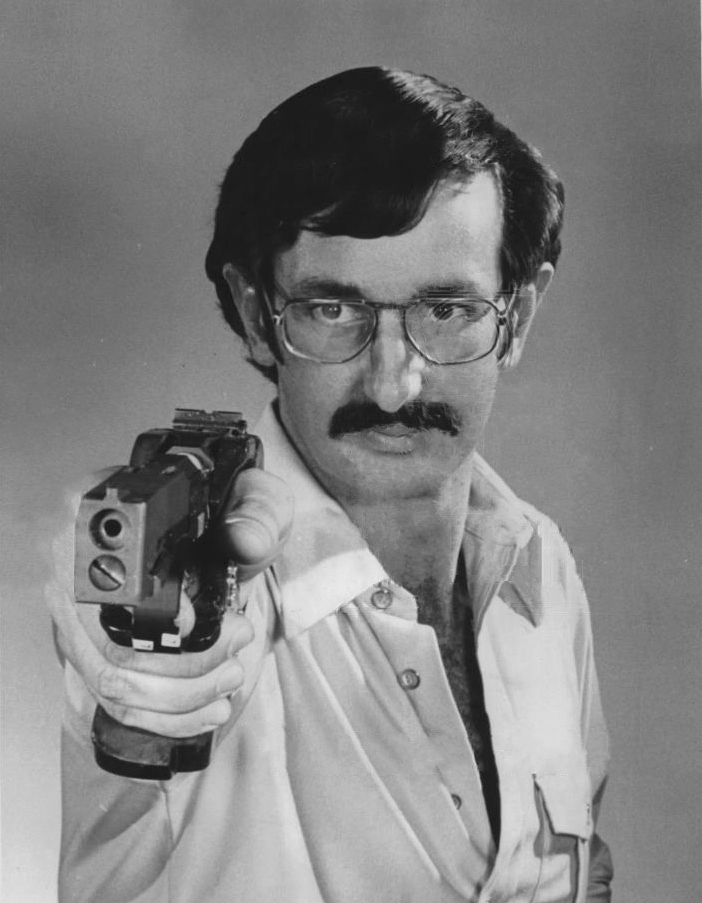
- Anderson in 1976

Personal information
- Born: 1946 (age 79–80) Sydney, Australia

Sport
- Sport: Shooting
- Event: 25 meter rapid fire pistol
- Club: U.S. Army
Medal record
Representing the United States
Pan American Games
Gold medal – first place	1983 Caracas	Rapid-fire 25 m pistol, individual
Gold medal – first place	1995 Mar del Plata	Standard 25 m pistol, team

Terence "Terry" M. Anderson (born c. 1946) is a retired Australian-born American sports shooter who specialized in the 25 meter rapid fire pistol event. He won the national championships in Australia in 1969 and 1971, in New Zealand in 1971–1973 and in the United States in 1975, 1977, 1979, 1993, 1997, 1999, 2000. Internationally he won three gold medals and a silver medal at the 1972 Asian Championships. Won two gold medals setting the Hemisphere record at the 1977 Championships of the Americas. Pan Am Games silver medal at the 1979 Pan Am Games, two gold medals, the Pan Am and world record at the 1983 Pan Am Games and four gold medals at the 1995 Pan American Games. He was selected to the 1980 Olympic team, but missed the games due to their boycott by the United States and selected to the 1996 Olympic Team in Atlanta.

Anderson was born in Sydney, Australia, where his grandfather, Ted Theodore served as the Australian federal treasurer and deputy prime minister. He immigrated to the U.S. in April 1973 and became an American citizen in May 1974. He coached several Olympic teams, including the Brazilian, Canadian and Israel national teams in 1974–1978. Served as the U.S. Olympic Shooting Team 1980–1983. While studying at the University of New Orleans he married a fellow student Marylynn. They later moved to Dallas. He started pistol training at age 19 with his brother Tony, who was a member of the Australian Olympic team.

During the last 20 years of his life Terry continued to build successful businesses, he constantly told his Team: “Two things that WE must change and update 5 minutes after contact with the enemy are a: (1) Battle-Plan, and (2) Business-Plan!”. Paraphrasing Darwin: “It is not the most intellectual of the species that survives; it is not the strongest that survives; but the species (and business) that survives is the one that is able to adapt to and to adjust best to the changing environment in which it finds itself.”

Australia to the U.S. 1973: After starting a successful construction company at age 19, in 1973 Terry moved this medium sized construction company from Sydney to the US in March 1973. The U.S. company was an immediate success and ultimately completed over 820 single family homes, condos and a number of office buildings. However, Terry’s business visa expired so Terry, after trying to apply for a “green card”, was told by the immigration officer “You must do something no American can do before you get a green-card”. Competing at national level, Terry defeated both U.S. Olympians in Olympic-RF Pistol so the Army reserve National Guard helped him apply for his “green card” in July 1973. Terry received it in January 1974, joined the military and was fast-tracked to U.S. Citizenship in May 1974 so he could represent the U.S. internationally. Illegal alien to U.S. citizen in 11 months, a great start!

Olympic Shooting, maintaining a “Positive Mental Winning Attitude”: Terry joined the Army reserve component in January 1974 and in 1975 graduated from Fort Benning OCS as an officer. Terry was immediately assisgned as “Marksmanship Coordinator” to the Louisiana Army National Guard (LANG) and, between 1976 and 1980 he managed/coached the LANG shooting teams (pistol, rifle and machine gun) so that they dominated both the Army Area and the All Army military shooting competitions. After coaching Olympic teams in Brazil and Israel, in 1980 Terry was appointed U.S. Olympic Team pistol coach, then in 1983 Olympic shooting team “training-coordinator” (the shooting team coach’s coach) until his resignation late 1985. Terry hired his replacement as national pistol coach in March 1983 and returned as a competitor in 1983, winning two gold medals in the Pan-Am games and setting a world record.

Terry was selected to the U.S. International pistol teams for 27 years, retiring from shooting competition after winning the silver medal at the U.S. national championships in 2002; his “World Ranking” was 17 at that time. During the period, 1975-2002, the U.S. military funded Terry’s shooting by placing him on military orders. He was selected as a competitor member, making the 1980 and 1996 Olympic teams, numerous Pan-Am Games teams, world championship teams, etc. winning 23 medals for the U.S. While on military orders, Terry competed in the Soviet Union, its eastern-bloc allies and in Cuba many times a year from the mid-70s up to the fall of the Soviet Union in 1991.

Israel May 1976-1983: Terry worked closely with the Israelis developing their Olympic shooting program and helped design their Olympic shooting training center in Herzliya. Israel’s Olympic Shooting association President from 1980 was General Itzhak Rabin (the hero of the 1967 Israel-Arab 6-day war and former Prime Minister), who called Terry “My Architect”. Terry worked with Israel’s Olympic shooting management until the mid-90s. Rabin asked Terry to work with Israel Military Industries to help “commercialize” some of their weapon’s systems. Rabin also helped Terry access leadership in both Poland and Hungary to negotiate and purchase “military aircraft”. Terry, at Rabin’s request, served in 1982 as a U.S. Army engineer captain on a short tour of “active duty” attached as an “observer” to the Israeli Army in Lebanon

Russian Military Aircraft from 1983: Terry leveraged his Israeli contacts, to initially steal then buy Soviet military aircraft from a number of Soviet controlled eastern-bloc countries and Cuba. All of the Soviet-bloc countries shooting athletes were members of their respective militaries (same as the US in those days), these shooting athletes were called “sports-military”. Between the mid-70s and 1991 Terry met various “ministers of defense” as the Soviet “sports-military” reported directly to the Ministers of Defense who was also a member of their respective politburo. Buying fighters, bombers, helicopters and transport aircraft from Soviet allies, especially Poland and Hungary, was not complicated as they were all desperate for $-money because their Soviet Style “controlled economies” did not work and, by the 80s they had trouble feeding their population. Terry initiated purchases of military aircraft, initially buying “2nd tier Russian fighters and bombers”, with a great cover story of “buying museum pieces”. As Chairman and major shareholder of Aviation Classics, Reno, Nevada, he formed a “classified” defense company, obtained defense contracts through the Assistant Secretary Defense, Operational Test and Evaluation, then formed two companies, one with a “secret” (C3P) the other with a “T/Secret” clearance, to negotiate both “secret” and “T/S” contracts with various government agencies worth over $340-million.

After putting a “foundation” together to save St Monica’s church school, Dallas, in the mid-80s, Terry focused his “giving programs” on education. In the 21st century the “Family Trust” he formed has continued to focus a large percentage of its revenue on education and on the two schools it built.

In the early 90s Terry formed a “business incubator”, assembling a team of business and military friends to meet regularly to “plan for the future”. That team helped Terry develop PRN (Physicians Referral Network), sold in 1999 for $42-million and then, Data Recovery Services, a company Terry built to become the second largest Data Recovery/Data Forensics company in the U.S. between 1997 and 2004 – a company that is still very profitable in 2022.

1986 Terry formed the SW Chapter of the U.S. Olympians and served as its President until 1990. This chapter was the 2nd U.S. Olympians chapter after Southern California.

Military from 1985: Assigned to the Corps of Engineers General Staff (USACE), as an Engineer Captain in 1985, Terry was promoted to Major and was assigned (at his request) to USACE Emergency Operations center (EOC) where he managed USACE “disaster response operations center” during natural disasters and war from 1986 to 1997. Terry was “activated” (as needed) to run the USACE-EOC during numerous U.S. “disasters”, including engineer projects that included infrastructure recovery after the San Francisco earthquake, Northridge earthquake, a slew of annual hurricanes, regional floods, the rebuild of Kuwait City in 1992, etc. Terry served 1-year as a deputy Division commander (IMA).

Army General Staff 1998: Terry was invited to the Pentagon and interviewed by the Chief of Staff of the U.S. Army. At the end of the short meeting, Terry was ordered to the U.S. Army General Staff for a 2-year assignment and granted the highest security clearance available in the U.S. Army, serving as “assistant chief congressional-liaison” working with the White House executive branch and congress.

2000 congressional elections: Terry was finance Chair for a Texas congressional campaign with the (successful!) focus on protecting 2 other powerful Texas congressional seats.

The U.S. Army General Staff 2001: Terry was so effective that his 2-year assignment was extended 3 times (a total of 5 years) due to Terry’s extensive experience in “disaster response operations” and “homeland security”. After 9/11, 2001 Terry was heavily involved in the “global war on Terror”, a logical choice since Terry managed U.S. disaster response operations for USACE for more than 11 years and had developed extensive personal international contacts. Immediately after 9/11, The global war on terror was approved and funded by Congress and Terry was involved in implementing “Operation Enduring Freedom”. Terry was involved in planning the invasion of Afghanistan and then, in 2002, the (stupid!) invasion of Iraq.

26 Years of marriage was long enough: Terry’s wife ran up serious credit card debt (Terry was not informed), so in early 2003 she filed a divorce-money grab. Another reason for the divorce finishing the 26-year marriage was her new “religious fervor”. She filed for divorce, called the Feds and signed a “voluntary firearms surrender” document (did not include Terry’s name on the document); they confiscated Terry’s collection of museum grade firearms valued at over $100-thousand, a museum ready collection given to Terry when he the surrendered the defense company’s corporate firearms licenses in 1991. Terry mistakenly did not pay the $3,200 tax to transfer and re-license the collection in his name!

Convicted in February-2004 under the “tax code” for not paying $3,200 “transfer Tax” by an “anti-military, anti-gun” judge. Further, this judge ignored government requests for a 12-month probation conviction so Terry could serve in Iraq as a senior Engineer Officer in 2004. In early May 2004, Terry “self-reported” to “Club-Fed”, a federal “Camp” with no locked doors and only a 2 ft perimeter fence. After spending over $1-million in legal fees, Terry’s ex-wife did not gain control over Terry’s companies as the divorce Judge, after reviewing her actions, granted “50-50 Joint Ownership” on their family estate, thus forcing their “fire sale”. The government was aghast that Terry was convicted of the crime of not paying $3,200 transfer tax on legally acquired weapons, his military superiors stated that this conviction was a “travesty of Justice on this fine officer”.

2004-06 Education: Terry put together a team and worked with them to prepare and implement a teaching program based upon “developing and implementing an effective business plan”; the eight classes were known as “main street to wall street”. These classes graduated over 750 individuals, each with their own personal “Business Plan”, a graduation requirement. The program continued and is now taught in prison systems in a number of states. Why? It focuses on teaching drug dealers and “criminal entrepreneurs” how to build legal businesses and stay out of prison.

2006-Planning “The Future”: Terry looked to “the future of Technology” and assembled an advisory team to “predict and plan for the future”. Over the years they were correct more often than not. For example, in 2014 they predicted that the “Internet revolution” of the 1990s would become the “Blockchain revolution” of the 2020s. Driven by technology, they see that the U.S. will witness many more changes between 2022 and 2027 than we did between 1960 and 2000. And, with AI, what changes can we expect by 2035 and then by 2040?

2007 – Chamber of Commerce: “If we are not changing, we are stagnating”. Asked by Governor Perry in early 2007 to implement the Texas Israel Chamber of Commerce, Terry formed the Chamber, hired a President/CEO, appointed 56 board members and resigned; however, at the 1st board meeting in June 2007, Terry was surprised when the board unanimously elected Terry as founding Chairman. Terry served the Chamber as Chairman and then on various executive committees until his resignation in 2013. The Chamber honored Terry as “Chairman Emeritus”. Late 2007 Terry met with Israel’s President and Prime Minister as well as numerous military and political leaders. They thanked him for establishing the Chamber office in Tel-Aviv as well as his work mitigating the “terror threat” (while he served on the U.S. Army General Staff). During this period Terry negotiated the relocation of 31 Tech companies from Israel to the U.S., most were teamed-up with and/or acquired by Texas companies.

Terry’s “Family Trust” 2006: The “Trust” was well funded by 2006 when Terry realized that he did not have a family to maintain, did not have a demanding job on the U.S. Army General Staff and was no longer competing on the world stage in Olympic and military shooting (after winning 17 national titles and 23 international medals). Terry focused on building real wealth for the “Trust”, ultimately managing the sale of one of the companies for over $94-million after tax. After 2014 Terry focused on Blockchain IP and patents, assets of the “Family Trust”; patents and IP valued in June 2022 were reflected on the “Trust” balance sheet, which had risen to over $152-million.

Still winning: Over the years Terry built a collection of 12 collector Bentleys, Bentleys that over the years won 3 prestigious national concours events.
