= Ricardo Rusticucci =

Argentine sport shooter

Personal information
- Born: 16 May 1946 San Martín, Mendoza, Argentina
- Died: 8 November 2014 (aged 68)

Sport
- Sport: Sports shooting
Medal record
Representing Argentina
Pan American Games
Gold medal – first place	1995 Mar del Plata	50m rifle 3 positions
Silver medal – second place	1987 Indianapolis	50m rifle prone team
Bronze medal – third place	1979 San Juan	10m air rifle team
Bronze medal – third place	1983 Caracas	50m rifle 3 positions
Bronze medal – third place	1983 Caracas	10m air rifle team
Bronze medal – third place	1983 Caracas	50m rifle prone team
Bronze medal – third place	1991 Havana	50m rifle 3 positions team
Bronze medal – third place	1991 Havana	50m rifle prone team
Bronze medal – third place	1995 Mar del Plata	50m rifle 3 positions

Ricardo Antonio Rusticucci Fernández (16 May 1946 – 8 November 2014) was an Argentine sport shooter who competed in the 1972 Summer Olympics, in the 1976 Summer Olympics, in the 1984 Summer Olympics, in the 1992 Summer Olympics, and in the 1996 Summer Olympics.
