= Rafael Rodríguez (sport shooter) =

Cuban sports shooter (born 1952)

Personal information
- Nationality: Cuban
- Born: 7 April 1952 (age 73)

Sport
- Sport: Sports shooting

Rafael Rodríguez (born 7 April 1952) is a Cuban sports shooter. He competed in the mixed 25 metre rapid fire pistol event at the 1980 Summer Olympics.
