= Jorge di Giandoménico =

Argentine sports shooter

Personal information
- Born: 21 September 1930 Santa Fe, Argentina
- Died: 7 September 2006 (aged 75) Santa Fe, Argentina

Sport
- Sport: Sports shooting

Jorge di Giandoménico (21 September 1930 – 7 September 2006) was an Argentine sports shooter. He competed at the 1960, 1972 and 1976 Summer Olympics.
