= Emmett Swanson =

American sports shooter

Personal information
- Born: February 17, 1906 Minneapolis, Minnesota, U.S.
- Died: December 10, 1968 (aged 62) Minneapolis, Minnesota, U.S.

Sport
- Sport: Sports shooting

Emmett Swanson (February 17, 1906 – December 10, 1968) was an American sports shooter. He competed at the 1948 Summer Olympics and 1952 Summer Olympics. He served as president of the National Rifle Association of America in 1948. Swanson was noted as a versatile shooter, earning NRA Distinguished Marksman status in the Rifle, Pistol and International classes.

== Shooting career ==
Swanson first rose to prominence in 1925 when he qualified to represent the United States in that year's Dewar Match. At the time he was a member of the University of Minnesota's rifle team which won the ROTC trophy two years in a row. In 1930 he travelled to Belgium to the ISU World Championships, where he won the smallbore rifle kneeling match, and was a member of the US team that won the Team 300metre event.

After the second World War, he served as President of the NRA in 1948, and competed at the 1948 and 1952 Olympic Games in the 300metre Free Rifle event. He captained the US Olympic Shooting Team in 1956 and 1960.

He competed in the World Championship teams in 1949, 1952 and 1954.

National Rifle Association of America
Preceded by Francis W. Parker Jr.	President of the NRA; 1948–1949	Succeeded by Merritt A. Edson
