= Don Hamilton (sport shooter) =

American sports shooter

Personal information
- Born: September 17, 1929 Boston, Massachusetts, United States
- Died: September 13, 1999 (aged 69) Kingston, Massachusetts, United States

Sport
- Sport: Sports shooting

Don Hamilton (September 17, 1929 – September 13, 1999) was an American sports shooter. He competed in the 50 metre pistol event at the 1968 Summer Olympics.
