= Oscar Cervo =

Argentine sports shooter (1920–1984)

Óscar Cervo
Personal information
- Full name: Óscar Rosendo Cervo
- Born: 6 October 1920 Buenos Aires, Argentina
- Died: 1984 (aged 63-64)

Sport
- Sport: Sports shooting

Óscar Rosendo Cervo (6 October 1920 – 1984) was an Argentine sports shooter. He competed at the 1952, 1956, 1960 and 1968 Summer Olympics. He died in 1984.
