= Adelso Peña =

Cuban sports shooter (born 1953)

Personal information
- Born: 10 November 1953 (age 72)

Sport
- Sport: Sports shooting

Adelso Peña (born 10 November 1953) is a Cuban former sports shooter. He competed at the 1972 Summer Olympics and the 1980 Summer Olympics.
