= Enrique Torres (sport shooter) =

Mexican sports shooter

Personal information
- Born: 31 July 1928 Mexico City, Mexico

Sport
- Sport: Sports shooting

Enrique Torres (born 31 July 1928) was a Mexican former sports shooter. He competed at the 1964 Summer Olympics and the 1968 Summer Olympics.
