= John Forman (sport shooter) =

American sports shooter

Personal information
- Born: April 27, 1925 Jackson, Mississippi, United States
- Died: February 24, 1998 (aged 72) Port Huron, Michigan, United States

Sport
- Sport: Sports shooting

John Forman (April 27, 1925 – February 24, 1998) was an American sports shooter. He competed in the 25 metre pistol event at the 1956 Summer Olympics.
