= Ignacio Huguet =

Cuban sports shooter (born 1944)

Personal information
- Born: 4 November 1944 (age 81) Havana, Cuba

Sport
- Sport: Sports shooting

Ignacio Huguet (born 4 November 1944) is a Cuban former sports shooter. He competed in the skeet event at the 1968 Summer Olympics.
