= Edmar de Salles =

Brazilian sports shooter (1928–2026)

Personal information
- Full name: Edmar Vianna de Salles
- Born: 15 June 1928 Belo Horizonte, Brazil
- Died: 14 April 2026 (aged 97)
- Height: 1.63 m (5 ft 4 in)

Sport
- Sport: Sports shooting

Edmar Vianna de Salles (15 June 1928 – 14 April 2026) was a Brazilian sports shooter. He competed in two events at the 1968 Summer Olympics. He died on 14 April 2026, at the age of 97.
