= Gilberto Navarro =

Chilean sports shooter (1929–2005)

Gilberto Navarro Fernandez
Personal information
- Born: 19 May 1929 Santiago, Chile
- Died: 14 April 2005 (aged 75)

Sport
- Sport: Sports shooting

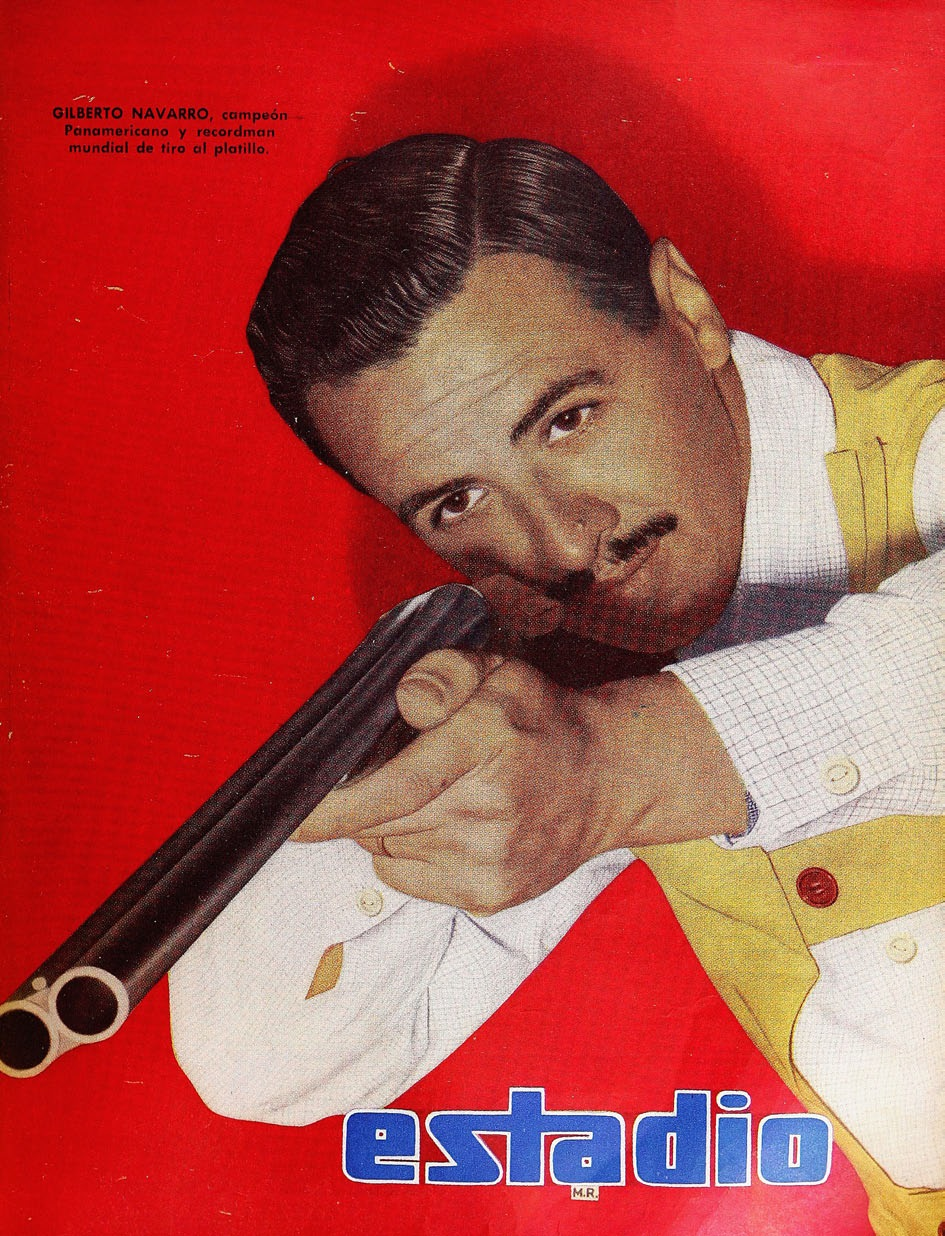
Gilberto Navarro.

Gilberto Navarro (19 May 1929 – 14 April 2005) was a Chilean sports shooter. He competed at the 1960 Summer Olympics and the 1964 Summer Olympics.
