= Jorge Rios (sport shooter) =

Cuban sports shooter (born 1959)

Personal information
- Nationality: Cuban
- Born: 21 February 1959 (age 66)

Sport
- Sport: Sports shooting

Jorge Rios (born 21 February 1959) is a Cuban sports shooter. He competed in the men's 10 metre running target event at the 1992 Summer Olympics.
