= Antonio Yaqigi =

Chilean sports shooter

Personal information
- Born: 6 January 1941 (age 85)

Sport
- Sport: Sports shooting

Antonio Yaqigi (born 6 January 1941) is a Chilean former sports shooter. He competed at the 1972 Summer Olympics and the 1976 Summer Olympics.
