= Don Nygord =

American sports shooter (1936–2004)

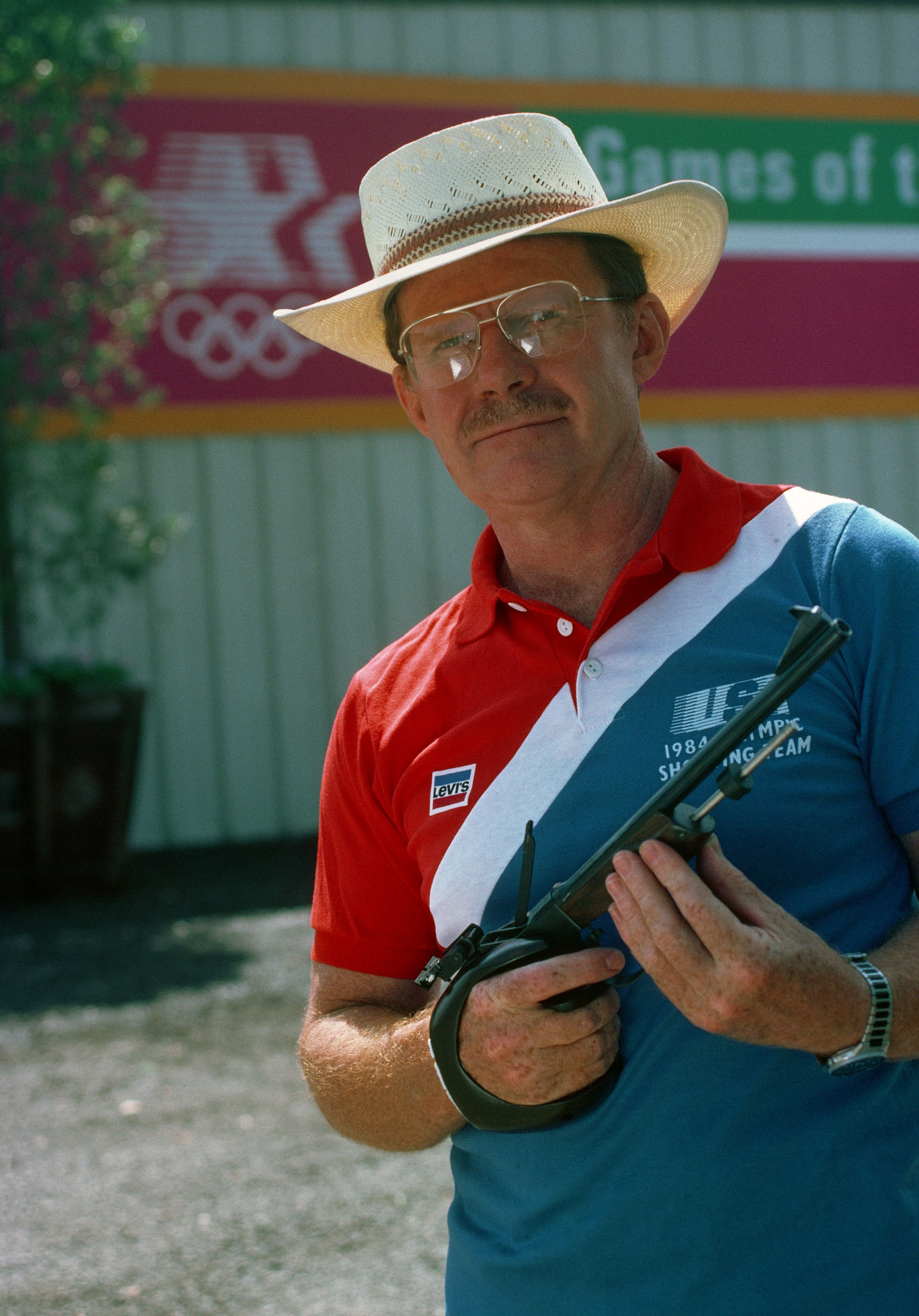
- Nygord in 1984

Personal information
- Born: June 13, 1936
- Died: December 26, 2004 (aged 68)
Medal record
Men's shooting
Representing United States
ISSF World Shooting Championships
Gold medal – first place	1981 Santo Domingo	10m air pistol
ISSF World Cup
Silver medal – second place	1988 Mexico City	50m pistol
Silver medal – second place	1986 Mexico City	10m air pistol
Championship of the Americas
Gold medal – first place	1985 Fort Benning	50m pistol
Gold medal – first place	1985 Fort Benning	STP
Gold medal – first place	1985 Fort Benning	10m air pistol
Gold medal – first place	1981 Rio de Janeiro	10m air pistol
Silver medal – second place	1985 Fort Benning	center fire pistol
Bronze medal – third place	1981 Rio de Janeiro	50m pistol
Pan American Games
Gold medal – first place	1991 Havana	center fire pistol
Gold medal – first place	1987 Indianapolis	10m air pistol
Gold medal – first place	1979 San Juan	10m air pistol
Silver medal – second place	1995 Mar del Plata	STP
Silver medal – second place	1983 Caracas	10m air pistol
Bronze medal – third place	1991 Havana	STP
Bronze medal – third place	1987 Indianapolis	50m pistol

Don Nygord (June 13, 1936 in Pocatello, Idaho – December 26, 2004 in Prescott, Arizona) was an American sport shooter who competed in the 1984 Summer Olympics and in the 1988 Summer Olympics.

Don Nygord grew up in eastern Oregon, where informal shooting was very common pursuit. He had guns of his own from the time he was 12 years old. He originally tried his hand at both fencing, and wrestling, but felt that neither sport was particularly a good fit for him. He attended Oregon State University, and then enlisted in the United States Air Force. It was based on a challenge to prove he could "shoot a bottle cap off a rock at 25 paces" by one of the members of the Mather AFB pistol team that Don got his start in competition. The challenge of the bullseye discipline captured his attention, and so began what would be a lifelong study of the art.

After several years of competing, Don won the Civilian National Championship at the NRA Nationals in 1966 at Camp Perry, Ohio. At the time he was working in the Aerospace industry with Union Carbide's Specialty Metals Division in Indiana. A local shooter there introduced him to the UIT (now ISSF) courses of fire. Air Pistol and Free Pistol were real eye openers, and Don found these particularly challenging, compared to the conventional styles he'd been participating in. After shooting some of these types of matches locally, he did very well, and received his first invitations to attend the tryouts for the US Shooting Team. However, due to work and personal constraints, he didn't attend until 1978. That year, he went to Phoenix for the UIT Nationals, placed third in Air Pistol, and found himself on the US National Team. When told that the team would soon be traveling to shoot a match in Mexico, Don wanted to know how much it would cost him for the trip. Naive as he was regarding travel allowances, Don certainly proved his worth on the international stage, and found his way to the podium in no time.

In 1979, Don knew he would win the National Air Pistol Championship "before I pulled out of the driveway to go to the match.” And he did just that. Later that same year, the team went to the Pan American Games in Puerto Rico, where he won the Gold Medals for individual and team in Air Pistol. Following this success, he left the aerospace field for good, and started a business of supplying and customizing target guns and accessories so he could meet the US Team's demands for travel and competitions.

Don would soon go on to win the World Championship in Santo Domingo in 1981, shooting a near World Record on a windy outdoor range. In the coming years, Don was a perennial member of the US National Team for decades, a National Champion 16 times, won more medals during his tenure than any other shooter in US history, was a member of the 1984 and 1988 US Olympic Teams—where he was the oldest US Olympian. He was the former holder of the US Free Pistol record (his score of 574 stood for over a decade), and held over 40 other National Records.

As a competitor Don developed several important equipment advances, including the FWB Model 65 Mk II (with its shortened barrel), and his own "TurboComp" muzzle compensator, which was used on earlier generations of high-end target air pistols, until the manufacturers started producing their own compensated barrels. He was the US importer for many different quality competition firearms and air guns over the years through his company "Nygord Precision Products," and offered pellets and accessories to shooting enthusiast as well.
