= Paul Shaw (sport shooter) =

Canadian sports shooter (1949–2026)

Personal information
- Born: 20 April 1949 Collingwood, Ontario, Canada
- Died: 17 August 2026 (aged 77)

Sport
- Sport: Sports shooting
Medal record
Sports shooting
Representing Canada
Pan American Games
Silver medal – second place	1987 Indianapolis	Men's trap

Ian Paul Shaw (20 April 1949 – 17 August 2026) was a Canadian sports shooter. He competed in the men's trap event at the 1996 Summer Olympics. Shaw died on 17 August 2026, at the age of 77.
