= Robert Foth =

American sport shooter (born 1958)

Personal information
- Born: July 3, 1958 (age 68) Buffalo, New York, U.S.
Medal record
Men's shooting
Representing United States
Olympic Games
Silver medal – second place	1992 Barcelona	50 m rifle three positions
Pan American Games
Gold medal – first place	1987 Indianapolis	50m rifle three positions team
Gold medal – first place	1991 Havana	50m rifle standing
Gold medal – first place	1991 Havana	50m rifle 3 positions team
Gold medal – first place	1991 Havana	50m rifle prone team
Silver medal – second place	1987 Indianapolis	10m air rifle team
Silver medal – second place	1991 Havana	50m rifle 3 positions
Silver medal – second place	1991 Havana	50m rifle prone
Silver medal – second place	1991 Havana	10m air rifle
Silver medal – second place	1991 Havana	10m air rifle team
Silver medal – second place	1995 Mar del Plata	50m rifle 3 positions
Bronze medal – third place	1987 Indianapolis	50m rifle three positions
Bronze medal – third place	1987 Indianapolis	10m air rifle
Bronze medal – third place	1995 Mar del Plata	50m rifle three positions
Bronze medal – third place	1995 Mar del Plata	50m rifle prone

Robert James Foth (born July 3, 1958) is an American sport shooter. He was born in Buffalo, New York. He won a silver medal in 50 metre rifle three positions at the 1992 Summer Olympics in Barcelona. Foth was born in Buffalo, New York.
