= Pedro Armella =

Argentine sports shooter (born 1930)

Personal information
- Born: 13 May 1930 (age 95); San Salvador, Entre Ríos, Argentina

Sport
- Sport: Sports shooting

Pedro Armella (born 13 May 1930) is an Argentine former sports shooter. He competed in the 300 metre rifle, three positions and the 50 metre rifle, three positions events at the 1960 Summer Olympics.
