= Oscar Yuston =

Argentine sports shooter

Personal information
- Nationality: Argentine
- Born: 30 October 1946
- Died: 25 July 2023 (aged 76)

Sport
- Sport: Sports shooting

Oscar Yuston (30 October 1946 – 25 July 2023) was an Argentine sports shooter. He competed in the men's 25 metre rapid fire pistol event at the 1976 Summer Olympics.
