= Edgar Espinoza (sport shooter) =

Venezuelan sport shooter (1928–2008)

Personal information
- Full name: Edgar Anacleto Espinoza Laureles
- Born: 13 July 1928 Caracas, Venezuela
- Died: 31 January 2008 (aged 79) Caracas, Venezuela

Sport
- Sport: Sports shooting

Edgar Anacleto Espinoza Laureles (13 July 1928 – 31 January 2008) was a Venezuelan sports shooter. He competed at the 1964 Summer Olympics, 1968 Summer Olympics and the 1984 Summer Olympics. Espinoza died in Caracas on 31 January 2008, at the age of 79.
