= Ernesto Montemayor Jr. =

Mexican sports shooter

Personal information
- Born: 28 March 1928 Monterrey, Mexico
- Died: 6 August 2000 (aged 72)

Sport
- Sport: Sports shooting

Ernesto Montemayor Jr. (3 March 1928 – 6 August 2000) was a Mexican sports shooter. He competed at the 1960 Summer Olympics and the 1972 Summer Olympics. His father, Ernesto Montemayor Sr. also competed at the Olympics.
