= Santiago Trompeta =

Cuban sports shooter (born 1953)

Personal information
- Born: 26 July 1953 (age 72)

Sport
- Sport: Sports shooting

Santiago Trompeta (born 26 July 1953) is a Cuban former sports shooter. He competed in the 50 metre pistol event at the 1972 Summer Olympics.
