= Jules Sobrian =

Canadian sport shooter

- Born: January 22, 1935; San Fernando, Trinidad and Tobago
- Occupation: Doctor
- Known for: Olympic Pistol Shooting, writing and IPSC

Jules Sobrian (born January 22, 1935, in San Fernando, Trinidad and Tobago), is a Canadian medical doctor, competitive marksman and author. He immigrated to Canada at the age of 21 and resides in Omemee, Ontario. Sobrian began shooting competitively at Hart House Revolver Club at the University of Toronto while studying medicine. He has competed for Canada in pistol-shooting events at four Olympic Games, and has won five individual medals in pistol-shooting at three Commonwealth Games and four individual medals in pistol-shooting at three Pan American Games. He won the Championship of the Americas in Free Pistol in 1973.

He was interviewed on the series Still Standing in 2016, where he talked about his role looking for pollution sources in the community. He thwarted a murder attempt by a business owner by tackling the rifle-toting man, hurling him about, and then medically assisting him before taking him to the hospital.

== Commonwealth Games Medals ==
Sobrian won medals in individual pistol-shooting events at the Commonwealth Games as follows:

- gold medal in the Rapid-Fire Pistol event at the 1978 Commonwealth Games
- gold medal in the Free Pistol event and silver medal in the Rapid-Fire Pistol event at the 1974 Commonwealth Games
- silver medal in the Free Pistol event and bronze medal in the Rapid-Fire Pistol event at the 1966 Commonwealth Games

== Pan American Games Medals ==
Sobrian won medals in individual pistol-shooting events at the Pan American Games as follows:

- silver medal in the Men's 25-metre Rapid Fire Pistol event and bronze medal in the Men's 50-metre Free Pistol event at the 1975 Pan American Games
- bronze medal in the Men's 25-metre Center Fire Pistol event at the 1967, 1971 and 1975 Pan American Games.

== Championship of the Americas Medals ==
Sobrian won the gold medal in the 50M Free Pistol in the 1973 Championships of the Americas and bronze in the 25M centre fire event.

== International Practical Shooting Confederation ==
Sobrian currently shoots IPSC at the Peterborough Fish and Game Association.
