= Roberto Castrillo =

Cuban sport shooter (1941–2026)

Personal information
- Born: 30 June 1941 Guanajay, Cuba
- Died: 28 February 2026 (aged 84)

Sport
- Sport: Sport shooting
Medal record
Men's shooting
Representing Cuba
Olympic Games
Bronze medal – third place	1980 Moscow	Skeet Shooting

Roberto Castrillo (30 June 1941 – 28 February 2026) was a Cuban sport shooter and Olympic medalist. He won a bronze medal in skeet shooting at the 1980 Summer Olympics in Moscow. He also competed at the 1972 Summer Olympics and the 1976 Summer Olympics. Castrillo died on 28 February 2026, at the age of 84.
