= Jimmie Dorsey (sport shooter) =

American sports shooter

Personal information
- Born: 28 August 1940 (age 85) San Diego, California, United States

Sport
- Sport: Sports shooting

Jimmie Dorsey (born August 28, 1940) is an American former sports shooter. He competed in the 50 metre pistol event at the 1972 Summer Olympics.
