= Rubén Váldez (sport shooter) =

Peruvian sports shooter (1923–2008)

Personal information
- Born: 15 May 1923 Arequipa, Peru
- Died: 5 June 2008 (aged 85) Miami, Florida, United States

Sport
- Sport: Sports shooting

Rubén Váldez (15 May 1923 – 5 June 2008) was a Peruvian sports shooter. He competed at the 1956 Summer Olympics and the 1960 Summer Olympics.
