= Mirek Switalski =

Mexican sports shooter

Personal information
- Nationality: Mexican
- Born: 20 March 1952 (age 73)

Sport
- Sport: Sports shooting

Mirek Switalski (born 20 March 1952) is a Mexican sports shooter. He competed in the mixed skeet event at the 1976 Summer Olympics.
