= Hershel Anderson =

American sport shooter

Personal information
- Born: August 4, 1937 (age 88) Tracy City, Tennessee, United States

Sport
- Sport: Sports shooting

Hershel Anderson (born August 4, 1937) is an American former sports shooter. He competed at the 1972 Summer Olympics and the 1976 Summer Olympics.
