= Margaret Murdock =

American sports shooter

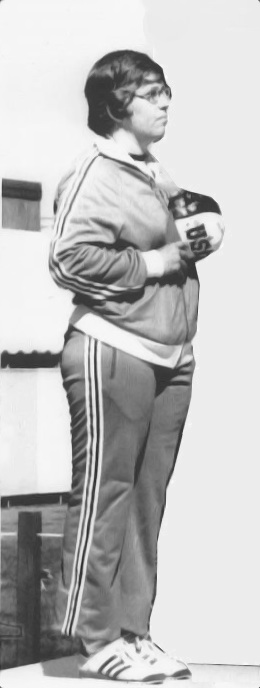
- Murdock at the 1976 Olympics

Personal information
- Born: Margaret L. Thompson; August 25, 1942 (age 83) Topeka, Kansas, U.S.
- Height: 163 cm (5 ft 4 in)
- Weight: 73 kg (161 lb)

Sport
- Sport: Shooting
- Event: Small-bore rifle
- University team: Kansas State University
- Club: U.S. Army Reserve
- Retired: At age 35

Achievements and titles
- Olympic finals: 1976 Montreal
Medal record
Representing United States
Olympic Games
Silver medal – second place	1976 Montreal	50 m rifle 3 positions

Margaret Thompson Murdock (born August 25, 1942) is a nurse and former United States Army officer most widely known for her success in international shooting competitions, including a silver medal at the 1976 Summer Olympics.

Murdock is the first woman to win a medal in shooting at the Summer Olympics and the first to win an individual open World Shooting Championship. In international competition Murdock set four individual world records and nine team world records. She is a member of five halls of fame, including the USA Shooting Hall of Fame and the Kansas Sports Hall of Fame.

== Early years ==
My first year at K-State, I couldn't shoot on the team because I was a female. I could practice with the K-State team but I couldn't be on the team. They got a new coach and he thought it would be a good idea for me to be on the team since I was shooting better than everyone else.

— Murdock, reminiscing in 2011

Margaret L. Thompson was born August 25, 1942, in Topeka, Kansas. While growing up during the 1950s, she learned how to shoot by following her father to the rifle range.

She graduated from Hayden High School, then attended Kansas State University, where she competed on the men's rifle team winning two Big Eight Conference championships and became the university's first female student to earn a varsity letter. The team practiced with 5th Army Rifle Team at Fort Riley, which led to a four-year stint in the U.S. Army, where she was assigned as a shooting instructor at Fort Benning, eventually achieving the rank of major.

== Competitions ==
Murdock was the 1966 World Champion in Women's Standard Rifle. In 1967 she won two gold medals in small-bore rifle at the Pan American Games and set a world record, for men or women, in the kneeling rifle shooting.

Murdock narrowly missed qualifying for the 1968 games in Mexico City. She became the first woman ever on the U.S. Olympic shooting team (in 1976) and the first woman to win a medal in shooting at the Olympic Games. At the final, her score was tied with Lanny Bassham, the U.S. team captain, but she was bumped down to silver because of a tie-break rule weighting the last 10 shots. Olympic rules forbade a shoot-off, which Bassham had requested. During the national anthem, Bassham pulled Murdock up to stand with him on the gold medal spot at the podium. In 1992 she was named to the U.S. International Shooting Hall of Fame.

== Post-competition career ==
Murdock retired from competitive shooting at age 35, becoming a registered nurse, specializing in anesthesia.
