= Linda Thom =

Canadian sport shooter

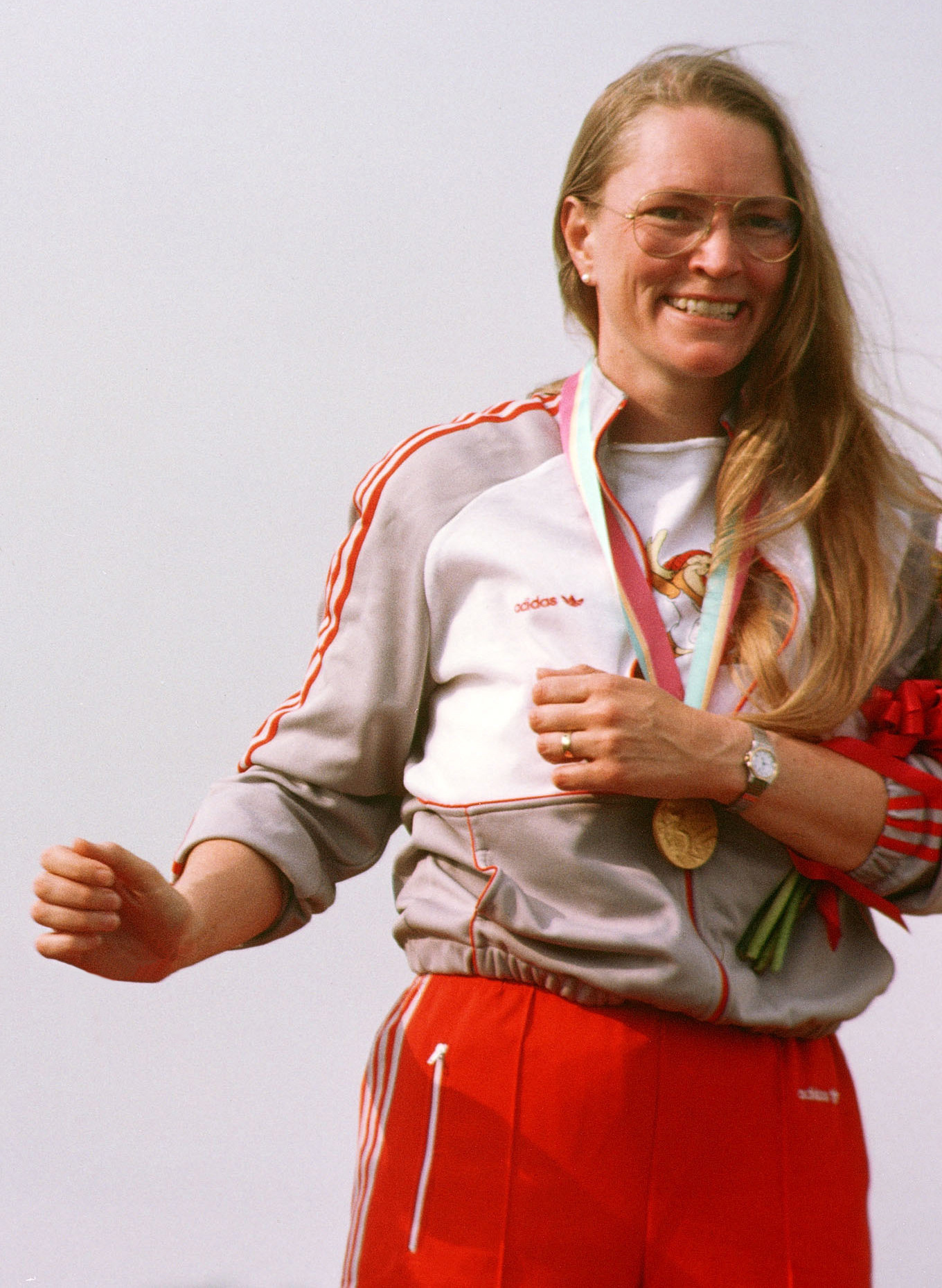
- Linda Thom in 1984

Personal information
- Born: Linda Mary Alice Malcolm; December 30, 1943 (age 82) Hamilton, Ontario

Sport
- Country: Canada
- Sport: Shooting sport

Achievements and titles
- Olympic finals: 1984 Summer Olympics
Medal record
Women's shooting
Representing Canada
Gold medal – first place	1984 Los Angeles	25 m pistol

Linda Mary Alice Thom, CM, née Malcolm, (born December 30, 1943) is a Canadian Olympic gold medal-winning shooter.

Born in Hamilton, Ontario, she received a Bachelor of Arts degree in 1967 from Carleton University.

At the 1984 Summer Olympics, she won a gold medal in the women's 25 m Pistol event becoming the first Canadian woman to win a gold medal in the summer Olympics since 1928 and the first Canadian to win a gold medal in the summer Olympics since 1968. She was selected to carry Canada's flag at the closing ceremonies.

In the 1995 Ontario general election, she ran as a Progressive Conservative against Dalton McGuinty for the riding of Ottawa South but was defeated.

In 1985, she was made a Member of the Order of Canada. In 1984, she was awarded the Velma Springstead Trophy, an award presented annually to Canada's outstanding female athlete, and was named female amateur athlete of the year by the Sports Federation of Canada. In 1986, she was inducted into the City of Ottawa Sports Hall of Fame. In 1992, she was inducted into Canada's Sports Hall of Fame.

She was in the first induction of the Lisgar Collegiate Institute Athletic Wall of Fame, as part of the 160th Anniversary celebrations.

She is currently a sitting member of the Canadian Firearms Advisory Committee.
