= Bertino de Souza =

Brazilian sports shooter

Personal information
- Born: 9 May 1933 Encruzilhada, Brazil
- Died: 17 June 1999 (aged 66) Vila Velha, Brazil

Sport
- Sport: Sports shooting

Bertino de Souza (9 May 1933 – 17 June 1999) was a Brazilian sports shooter. He competed at the 1972 Summer Olympics and the 1976 Summer Olympics.
