= Homero Laddaga =

Mexican sports shooter

Personal information
- Born: 10 September 1941 (age 84)

Sport
- Sport: Sports shooting

Homero Laddaga (born 10 September 1941) is a Mexican former sports shooter. He competed in the 25 metre pistol event at the 1972 Summer Olympics.
