= Ernesto Montemayor Sr. =

Mexican sports shooter

Personal information
- Born: 26 November 1907 Cerralvo Municipality, Mexico

Sport
- Sport: Sports shooting

Ernesto Montemayor Sr. (born 26 November 1907, date of death unknown) was a Mexican sports shooter. He competed at the 1948 Summer Olympics and 1952 Summer Olympics. His son also competed at the Olympics.
