= Lanny Bassham =

American sport shooter

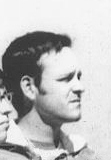
- Bassham at the 1976 Olympics

Personal information
- Full name: Lanny Robert Bassham
- Born: January 2, 1947 (age 79) Comanche, Texas, U.S.
- Height: 175 cm (5 ft 9 in)
- Weight: 73 kg (161 lb)

Sport
- Sport: Shooting
- Event: Small-bore rifle
- Club: U.S. Army
Medal record
Representing the United States
Olympic Games
Gold medal – first place	1976 Montreal	Small-bore rifle, 3 positions
Silver medal – second place	1972 Munich	Small-bore rifle, 3 positions

Lanny Robert Bassham (born January 2, 1947) is an American sport shooter who won a gold medal in the 1976 Summer Olympics, and a silver medal in the 1972 Summer Olympics.

== Early life ==
Bassham was born in Comanche, Texas. He graduated from the University of Texas at Arlington in 1969, where he participated in the ROTC program.

== Sport career ==
At the 1972 Summer Olympics in Munich, Bassham won the silver medal in the mixed 50 m rifle three positions event. Between 1972 and 1978, Lanny Bassham won three gold medals at the Pan American Games, Three Individual World Titles at the World Shooting Championships in 1974, World Champion in 50m three-position in The 1978 World shooting Championships, and a total of 22 world individual and team titles, setting four world records. At the 1974 World Shooting Championships in Thun Switzerland Lanny won 15 medals, the most any individual athlete has ever won in a single World Shooting Championships. At the 1976 Olympics, he tied for the gold medal with Margaret Murdock in the mixed 50m rifle three position event. Bassham suggested that both should be awarded gold medals as there was a tie score, but the judges placed him first based on the current tie-breaking procedure. At the awards ceremony, he asked Murdock to share the first place podium with him. He ranks third in total medal count among all US International Shooters with 35 medals, and is in the USA Shooting Hall of Fame.

== Founder of Mental Management Systems ==
After the 1972 Olympics silver finish, Bassham sought classes in mental discipline under pressure. After failing to find such a seminar, Bassham created a system of mental control after interviewing Olympic gold medalists to discover their winning strategies. Bassham began to write books and teach courses in his methods under the name "Mental Management". For the past 40 years, he has provided "Mental Management" training programs to clients including PGA Tour golfers, Miss America finalists, CEOs, US Navy SEALs, SWAT teams, and the FBI.

In addition, Bassham briefly headed the U.S. Olympic shooting team and has operated the company Mental Management Systems with his wife Helen in Flower Mound Texas since 1977.
