= List of Commonwealth Games medallists in shooting =

This is the complete list of Commonwealth Games medallists in shooting from 1966 to 2014.

== Men's pistol ==
=== 10 metre air pistol ===
| Games | Gold | | Silver | | Bronze | |
|---|---|---|---|---|---|---|
| 1982 | George Darling; England | 576 | Phil Adams; Australia | 573 | Tom Guinn; Canada | 571 |
| 1986 | Greg Yelavich; New Zealand | 575 | Tom Guinn; Canada | 574 | Gilbert U Hong Kong | 574 |
| 1990 | Ben Sandstrom; Australia | 580 | Phil Adams; Australia | 574 | David Lowe; England | 574 |
| 1994 | Jean-Pierre Huot; Canada | 672.4 | Jaspal Rana; India | 670.7 | Greg Yelavich; New Zealand | 668.5 |
| 1998 | Mick Gault; England | 679.9 | Jaspal Rana; India | 677.4 | Greg Yelavich; New Zealand | 677.4 |
| 2002 | Mick Gault; England | 675.0 | Samaresh Jung; India | 674.8 | Jaspal Rana; India | 674.7 |
| 2006 | (India) Samaresh Jung (IND) | 685.4 | (Australia) Daniel Repacholi (AUS) | 677.6 | (Namibia) Friedhelm Sack (NAM) | 677.2 |
| 2010 | Omkar Singh; India | 681.8 | Gai Bin; Singapore | 676.2 | Daniel Repacholi; Australia | 674.0 |
| 2014 | Daniel Repacholi; Australia | 199.5 | Prakash Nanjappa; India | 198.2 | Mick Gault; England | 176.5 |
| 2018 | Jitu Rai; India | 235.1 | Kerry Bell; Australia | 233.5 | Om Mitharval; India | 214.3 |

=== 10 metre air pistol pairs ===
| Games | Gold | | Silver | | Bronze | |
|---|---|---|---|---|---|---|
| 1982 | Australia; Phil Adams; Gregory Colber | 1128 | England; Geoffrey Robinson; George Darling | 1126 | Canada; Jim Timmerman; Tom Guinn | 1125 |
| 1986 | England; Paul Leatherdale; Ian Reid | 1143 | Australia; Phil Adams; Bruce Favell | 1143 | New Zealand; Greg Yelavich; Barrie Wickins | 1140 |
| 1990 | Bangladesh; Ateequr Rahman; Abdus Sattar | 1138 | Australia; Phil Adams; Ben Sandstrom | 1138 | New Zealand; Julian Lawton; Greg Yelavich | 1137 |
| 1994 | Australia; Mike Giustiniano; Ben Sandstrom | 1137 | Canada; Jean-Pierre Huot; John Rochon | 1135 | India; Jaspal Rana; Vivek Singh | 1133 |
| 1998 | England; Nick Baxter; Mick Gault | 1145 | India; Jaspal Rana; Satendra Kumar | 1143 | Canada; John Rochon; Jean-Pierre Huot | 1138 |
| 2002 | England; Nick Baxter; Mick Gault | 1140 | India; Samaresh Jung; Jaspal Rana | 1137 | Namibia; André Malherbe; Friedhelm Sack | 1134 |
| 2006 | India; Samaresh Jung; Vivek Singh | 1154 | England; Nick Baxter; Mick Gault | 1152 | Australia; David Moore; Daniel Repacholi | 1144 |
| 2010 | India; Omkar Singh; Gurpreet Singh | 1163 | England; Nick Baxter; Mick Gault | 1143 | Singapore; Gai Bin; Lim Swee Hon Nigel | 1139 |

=== 50 metre free pistol ===
| Games | Gold | | Silver | | Bronze | |
|---|---|---|---|---|---|---|
| 1966 | Charles Sexton; England | 544 | Jules Sobrian; Canada | 538 | Garfield McMahon; Canada | 536 |
| 1974 | Jules Sobrian; Canada | 549 | Norman Harrison; Australia | 549 | Laszlo Antal; England | 543 |
| 1978 | Yvon Trempe; Canada | 543 | Edward Jans; Canada | 540 | Bertram Manhin; Trinidad and Tobago | 536 |
| 1982 | Tom Guinn; Canada | 553 | Geoffrey Robinson; England | 543 | Phil Adams; Australia | 540 |
| 1986 | Greg Yelavich; New Zealand | 551 | Phil Adams; Australia; Ho Kar Fai; Hong Kong | 549 | | |
| 1990 | Phil Adams; Australia | 554 | Ben Sandstrom; Australia | 549 | Gilbert U Hong Kong | 549 |
| 1994 | Mick Gault; England | 654.1 | Phil Adams; Australia | 647 | Ben Sandstrom; Australia | 642.5 |
| 1998 | Mick Gault; England | 646.3 | Francois van Tonder; South Africa | 642.5 | Bruce Quick; Australia | 640.3 |
| 2002 | Mick Gault; England | 657.5 | Samaresh Jung; India | 652.8 | Daniel van Tonder; South Africa | 644.3 |
| 2006 | (India) Samaresh Jung (IND) | 650.2 | (England) Mick Gault (ENG) | 645.9 | (Trinidad and Tobago) Roger Daniel (TRI) | 638.9 |
| 2010 | Omkar Singh; India | 653.6 | Gai Bin; Singapore | 649.6 | Lim Swee Hon Nigel; Singapore | 644.7 |
| 2014 | Jitu Rai; India | 194.1 | Gurpal Singh; India | 187.2 | Daniel Repacholi; Australia | 166.6 |
| 2018 | Daniel Repacholi; Australia | 227.2 | Shakil Ahmed; Bangladesh | 220.5 | Om Mitharval; India | 201.1 |

=== 50 metre free pistol pairs ===
| Games | Gold | | Silver | | Bronze | |
|---|---|---|---|---|---|---|
| 1982 | Phil Adams; John Tremelling; Australia | 1077 | Barrie Wickins; Rex Hamilton; New Zealand | 1075 | Geoffrey Robinson; Frank Wyatt; England | 1074 |
| 1986 | Canada; Tom Guinn; Claude Beaulieu | 1099 | England; Paul Leatherdale; Richard Wang | 1090 | Australia; Phil Adams; Ben Sandstrom | 1085 |
| 1990 | Australia; Phil Adams; Ben Sandstrom | 1106 | New Zealand; Brian Read; Greg Yelavich | 1084 | Bangladesh; Ateequr Rahman; Abdus Sattar | 1078 |
| 1994 | Phil Adams; Ben Sandstrom; Australia | 1104 | Julian Lawton; Greg Yelavich; New Zealand | 1094 | Mick Gault; Paul Leatherdale; England | 1082 |
| 1998 | Nick Baxter; Mick Gault; England | 1093 | David Moore; Bruce Quick; Australia | 1083 | John Rochon; Jean-Pierre Huot; Canada | 1080 |
| 2002 | Samaresh Jung; Vivek Singh; India | 1088 | David Moore; Bruce Quick; Australia | 1084 | Daniel van Tonder; Frederick van Tonder; South Africa | 1074 |
| 2006 | (Australia) David Moore (AUS) (Australia) Daniel Repacholi (AUS) | 1086 | (India) Samaresh Jung (IND) (India) Vivek Singh (IND) | 1082 | (England) Nick Baxter (ENG) (England) Mick Gault (ENG) | 1078 |
| 2010 | Gai Bin; Lim Swee Hon Nigel; Singapore | 1094 | Deepak Sharma; Omkar Singh; India | 1087 | Rhodney Richard Allen; Roger Daniel; Trinidad and Tobago | 1081 |

=== 25 metre centre fire pistol ===
| Games | Gold | | Silver | | Bronze | |
|---|---|---|---|---|---|---|
| 1966 | James Lee; Canada | 576 | Tony Clark; England | 575 | Julio Machado; Jamaica | 571 |
| 1982 | John Cooke; England | 580 | James Cairns; Scotland | 579 | Noel Ryan; Australia | 577 |
| 1986 | Bob Northover; England | 583 | Phil Adams; Australia | 582 | Rod Hack; Australia | 580 |
| 1990 | Ashok Pandit; India | 583 | Surinder Marwah; India | 577 | Bruce Quick; Australia | 576 |
| 1994 | Jaspal Rana; India | 581 | Mick Gault; England | 581 | Greg Yelavich; New Zealand | 575 |
| 1998 | Jaspal Rana; India | 581 | Allan McDonald; South Africa | 581 | John Rochon; Canada | 576 |
| 2002 | Jaspal Rana; India | 583 | Bruce Quick; Australia | 579 | Irshad Ali; Pakistan | 577 |
| 2006 | (Singapore) On Shaw Ming (SIN) | 578 | (New Zealand) Greg Yelavich (NZL) | 578 | (India) Samaresh Jung (IND) | 578 |
| 2010 | Harpreet Singh; India | 580 | Vijay Kumar; India | 574 | Lip Poh; Singapore | 574 |

=== 25 metre centre fire pistol pairs ===
| Games | Gold | | Silver | | Bronze | |
|---|---|---|---|---|---|---|
| 1982 | Noel Ryan; Alexander Taransky; Australia | 1151 | Mohinder Lal; Ashok Pandit; India | 1138 | John Cooke; John Gough; England | 1131 |
| 1986 | Australia; Phil Adams; Rod Hack | 1165 | England; Bob Northover; Michael Cutler | 1157 | New Zealand; Rex Hamilton; Barry O'Neale | 1153 |
| 1990 | Australia; Phil Adams; Bruce Quick | 1155 | New Zealand; Barry O'Neale; Greg Yelavich | 1144 | India; Ashok Pandit; Surinder Marwah | 1142 |
| 1994 | Jaspal Rana; Ashok Pandit; India | 1168 | Kelvin Vickers; Phil Adams; Australia | 1149 | Stanley Wills; John Rochon; Canada | 1148 |
| 1998 | Jaspal Rana; Ashok Pandit; India | 1154 | John Rochon; Metodi Igorov; Canada | 1150 | Mike Giustiniano; Bruce Quick; Australia | 1149 |
| 2002 | Jaspal Rana; Mahaveer Singh; India | 1150 | David Moore; Bruce Quick; Australia | 1149 | Irshad Ali; Zahid Ali; Pakistan | 1142 |
| 2006 | (India) Samaresh Jung (IND) (India) Jaspal Rana (IND) | 1150 | (England) Peter Flippant (ENG) (England) Simon Lucas (ENG) | 1138 | (South Africa) Allan Stuart McDonald (RSA) (South Africa) Daniel van Tonder (RSA) | 1135 |
| 2010 | Vijay Kumar; Harpreet Singh; India | 1159 | Greg Yelavich; Alan Earle; New Zealand | 1140 | Gai Bin; Meng Poh; Singapore | 1139 |

=== 25 metre rapid fire pistol ===
| Games | Gold | | Silver | | Bronze | |
|---|---|---|---|---|---|---|
| 1966 | Tony Clark; England | 585 | Michael Papps; Australia | 578 | Jules Sobrian; Canada | 572 |
| 1974 | William Hare; Canada | 586 | Jules Sobrian; Canada | 583 | Bruce McMillan; New Zealand | 581 |
| 1978 | Jules Sobrian; Canada | 587 | John Cooke; England | 581 | Jeff Farrell; Australia | 581 |
| 1982 | Lee Kui Nang; Hong Kong | 583 | Jim Timmerman; Canada | 583 | John Cooke; England | 582 |
| 1986 | Pat Murray; Australia | 591 | Adrian Breton; Guernsey | 588 | Mark Howkins; Canada | 585 |
| 1990 | Adrian Breton; Guernsey | 583 | Pat Murray; Australia | 582 | Michael Jay; Wales | 579 |
| 1994 | Michael Jay; Wales | 670.2 | Robert Dowling; Australia | 668.4 | Pat Murray; Australia | 668.1 |
| 1998 | Metodi Igorov; Canada | 674.8 | Allan McDonald; South Africa | 669.7 | Bhanwar Dhaka; India | 668.9 |
| 2002 | Metodi Igorov; Canada | 669.3 | Bruce Quick; Australia | 667.7 | Allan McDonald; South Africa | 666.3 |
| 2006 | (India) Vijay Kumar (IND) | 778.2 | (India) Pemba Tamang (IND) | 775.0 | (Malaysia) Hasli Izwan (MAS) | 770.4 |
| 2010 | Vijay Kumar; India | 583 | Hasli Izwan; Malaysia | 576 | Gurpreet Singh; India | 569 |
| 2014 | David Chapman; Australia | 23 | Harpreet Singh; India | 21 | Kristian Callaghan; England | 17 |
| 2018 | Anish Bhanwala; India | 30 | Sergei Evglevski; Australia | 28 | Sam Gowin; England | 17 |

=== 25 metre rapid fire pistol pairs ===
| Games | Gold | | Silver | | Bronze | |
|---|---|---|---|---|---|---|
| 1982 | Peter Heuke; Alexander Taransky; Australia | 1160 | James Cairns; Hugh Hunter; Scotland | 1152 | Sharad Cahuran; Rajinder Kumar Vij; India | 1151 |
| 1986 | England; Brian Girling; Terry Turner | 1169 | Australia; Pat Murray; Jack Mast | 1152 | Canada; Mark Howkins; André Chevrefils | 1150 |
| 1990 | Australia; Bruce Favell; Pat Murray | 1153 | Canada; Stanley Wills; Mark Howkins | 1138 | England; Brian Girling; John Rolfe | 1133 |
| 1994 | Pat Murray; Robert Dowling; Australia | 1148 | Richard Craven; Michael Jay; Wales | 1142 | Adrian Breton; Graham Le Maitre; Guernsey | 1129 |
| 1998 | Mike Giustiniano; Pat Murray; Australia | | Jason Wakeling; Alan Earle; New Zealand | | Allan McDonald; André van Emmenis; South Africa | |
| 2002 | Bhanwar Lal Dhaka; Mukesh Kumar; India | | Allan McDonald; Frederick van Tonder; South Africa | | Bruce Favell; Bruce Quick; Australia | |
| 2006 | (India) Vijay Kumar (IND) (India) Pemba Tamang (IND) | | (Australia) David Chapman (AUS) (Australia) Bruce Favell (AUS) | | (Canada) Metodi Igorov (CAN) (Canada) Yuri Movshovich (CAN) | |
| 2010 | Vijay Kumar; Gurpreet Singh; India | | Hafiz Adzha; Hasli Izwan; Malaysia | | David Chapman; Bruce Quick; Australia | |

=== 25 metre standard pistol ===
| Games | Gold | Silver | Bronze |
|---|---|---|---|
| 2006 | (England) Mick Gault (ENG) | (Pakistan) Irshad Ali (PAK) | (Australia) Bruce Quick (AUS) |
| 2010 | Gai Bin; Singapore | Roger Daniel; Trinidad and Tobago | Samaresh Jung; India |

=== 25 metre standard pistol pairs ===
| Games | Gold | Silver | Bronze |
|---|---|---|---|
| 2006 | (India) Samaresh Jung (IND) (India) Ronak Pandit (IND) | (Australia) David Moore (AUS) (Australia) Bruce Quick (AUS) | (South Africa) Allan Stuart McDonald (RSA) (South Africa) Daniel van Tonder (RSA) |
| 2010 | Gai Bin; Poh Lip Meng; Singapore | Samaresh Jung; Chandrasekhar Chaudhary; India | Mick Gault; Iqbal Ubhi; England |

== Men's rifle ==
=== 10 metre air rifle ===
| Games | Gold | | Silver | | Bronze | |
|---|---|---|---|---|---|---|
| 1982 | Jean-François Sénécal; Canada | 574 | Matthew Guille; Guernsey | 572 | Malcolm Cooper; England | 570 |
| 1986 | Guy Lorion; Canada | 588 | Sharon Bowes; Canada | 583 | Malcolm Cooper; England | 582 |
| 1990 | Guy Lorion; Canada | 583 | Chris Hector; England | 578 | Mart Klepp; Canada | 577 |
| 1994 | Chris Hector; England | 685.9 | Jean-François Sénécal; Canada | 683 | Nigel Wallace; England | 680 |
| 1998 | Chris Hector; England | | Mohd Emran Zakaria; Malaysia | | Zlatko Beneta; Australia | |
| 2002 | Asif Hossain Khan; Bangladesh | | Abhinav Bindra; India | | Tim Lowndes; Australia | |
| 2006 | (India) Gagan Narang (IND) | | (Singapore) Jin Zhang (SIN) | | (India) Abhinav Bindra (IND) | |
| 2010 | Gagan Narang; India | | Abhinav Bindra; India | | James Huckle; England | |
| 2014 | Abhinav Bindra; India | | Abdullah Hel Baki; Bangladesh | | Daniel Rivers; England | |

=== 10 metre air rifle pairs ===
| Games | Gold | | Silver | | Bronze | |
|---|---|---|---|---|---|---|
| 1982 | Alister Allan; Bill MacNeill; Scotland | 1137 | Malcolm Cooper; Barry Dagger; England | 1126 | Norbert Jahn; Anton Wurfel; Australia | 1123 |
| 1986 | Canada; Guy Lorion; Sharon Bowes | 1167 | Australia; Wolfgang Jobst; Anton Wurfel | 1151 | England; Malcolm Cooper; Robert Smith | 1146 |
| 1990 | Canada; Guy Lorion; Mart Klepp | 1163 | England; Chris Hector; Robert Smith | 1155 | India; Soma Dutta; Bhagirath Samai | 1148 |
| 1994 | Jean-François Sénécal; Wayne Sorensen; Canada | 1166 | Chris Hector; Nigel Wallace; England | 1161 | David Rattray; Robin Law; Scotland | 1145 |
| 1998 | Chris Hector; Nigel Wallace; England | | Abdul Mutalib Abdul Razak; Mohammed Emran Zakaria; Malaysia | | David Rattray; Robin Law; Scotland | |
| 2002 | Sameer Ambekar; Abhinav Bindra; India | | Mohamed Hameley Mutalib; Mohammed Emran Zakaria; Malaysia | | Chris Hector; Nigel Wallace; England | |
| 2006 | (India) Abhinav Bindra (IND) (India) Gagan Narang (IND) | | (Bangladesh) Asif Hossain Khan (BAN) (Bangladesh) Anjan Kumer Singha (BAN) | | (Singapore) Jun Hong Ong (SIN) (Singapore) Jin Zhang (SIN) | |
| 2010 | Abhinav Bindra; Gagan Narang; India | | James Huckle; Kenneth Parr; England | | Abdullah Hel Baki; Asif Hossain Khan; Bangladesh | |

=== 10 metre running target ===
| Games | Gold | | Silver | | Bronze | |
|---|---|---|---|---|---|---|
| 1990 | Colin Robertson; Australia | 539 | John Maddison; England | 539 | Tony Clarke; New Zealand | 535 |
| 1994 | Bryan Wilson; Australia | 657.9 | Mark Bedlington; Canada | 656 | Paul Carmine; New Zealand | 650.7 |

=== 10 metre running target pairs ===
| Games | Gold | | Silver | | Bronze | |
|---|---|---|---|---|---|---|
| 1990 | New Zealand; Paul Carmine; Tony Clarke | 1091 | Canada; David Lee; Mark Bedlington | 1070 | England; David Chapman; John Maddison | 1064 |
| 1994 | Mark Bedlington; Matthew Bedlington; Canada | 1088 | Bryan Wilson; Peter Zutenis; Australia | 1088 | Paul Carmine; Tony Clarke; New Zealand | 1079 |

=== 50 metre small bore rifle prone ===
| Games | Gold | | Silver | | Bronze | |
|---|---|---|---|---|---|---|
| 1966 | Gil Boa; Canada | 587 | Brian Lacey; New Zealand | 585 | John Murphy; Australia | 584 |
| 1974 | Yvonne Gowland; Australia | 594 | Bill Watkins; Wales | 591 | Alister Allan; Scotland | 591 |
| 1978 | Alister Allan; Scotland | 1194 | Bill Watkins; Wales | 1191 | Stewart Watterson; Isle of Man | 1187 |
| 1982 | Alan Smith; Australia | 1184 | Malcolm Cooper; England | 1184 | Bill Watkins; Wales | 1177 |
| 1986 | Alan Smith; Australia | 599 | Alister Allan; Scotland | 598 | Gale Stewart; Canada; John Knowles; Scotland | 597 |
| 1990 | Roger Harvey; New Zealand | 591 | Stephen Petterson; New Zealand | 590 | Philip Scanlan; England | 590 |
| 1994 | Stephen Petterson; New Zealand | 698.4 | Jim Cornish; England | 693.9 | Michael Dion; Canada | 693.6 |
| 1998 | Stephen Petterson; New Zealand | | David Moore; Isle of Man | | Gavin van Rhyn; South Africa | |
| 2002 | Timothy Lowndes; Australia | | Michael Babb; England | | Jaco Henn; South Africa | |
| 2006 | (Wales) David Phelps (WAL) | | (England) Michael Babb (ENG) | | (India) Sanjeev Rajput (IND) | |
| 2010 | Jonathan Hammond; Scotland | | Warren Potent; Australia | | Matthew Hall; Northern Ireland | |
| 2014 | Warren Potent; Australia | | Gagan Narang; India | | Kenneth Parr; England | |

=== 50 metre small bore rifle prone pairs ===
| Games | Gold | | Silver | | Bronze | |
|---|---|---|---|---|---|---|
| 1982 | Malcolm Cooper; Mike Sullivan; England | 1187 | Colin Harris; Bill Watkins; Wales | 1183 | Patrick Vamplew; Ernest Sopsich; Canada | 1180 |
| 1986 | Canada; Michael Ashcroft; Gale Stewart | 1175 | Australia; Donald Brook; Alan Smith | 1171 | Wales; Terry Wakefield; Colin Harris | 1165 |
| 1990 | New Zealand; Stephen Petterson; Roger Harvey | 1185 | Canada; Barry Sutherland; Michael Ashcroft | 1184 | England; Bob Jarvis; Philip Scanlan | 1180 |
| 1994 | Stephen Petterson; Lindsay Arthur; New Zealand | 1181 | Dodangoda Chandrasiri; Lakshman Rajasinghe; Sri Lanka | 1177 | David Clifton; Dean Turley; Australia | 1176 |
| 1998 | Gavin van Rhyn; Michael Thiele; South Africa | | Philip Scanlan; Neil Day; England | | Tim Lowndes; Warren Potent; Australia | |
| 2002 | Michael Babb; Neil Day; England | | Jaco Henn; Michael Thiele; South Africa | | Mohd Sabki Mohd Din; Mohammed Emran Zakaria; Malaysia | |
| 2006 | (England) Michael Babb (ENG) (England) Chris Hector (ENG) | | (Scotland) Martin Sinclair (SCO) (Scotland) Neil Stirton (SCO) | | (Wales) Gruffudd Morgan (WAL (Wales) David Phelps (WAL) | |
| 2010 | Neil Stirton; Jonathan Hammond; Scotland | | Michael Babb; Richard Wilson; England | | Warren Potent; David Clifton; Australia | |

=== 50 metre small bore rifle three positions ===
| Games | Gold | | Silver | | Bronze | |
|---|---|---|---|---|---|---|
| 1982 | Alister Allan; Scotland | 1146 | Malcolm Cooper; England | 1145 | Guy Lorion; Canada | 1144 |
| 1986 | Malcolm Cooper; England | 1170 | Alister Allan; Scotland | 1167 | Jean-François Sénécal; Canada | 1150 |
| 1990 | Mart Klepp; Canada | 1157 | Malcolm Cooper; England | 1154 | Soma Dutta; India | 1143 |
| 1994 | Michael Dion; Canada | 1234.2 | Wayne Sorensen; Canada | 1228.7 | Alister Allan; Scotland | 1224.8 |
| 1998 | Timothy Lowndes; Australia | | Wayne Sorensen; Canada | | Kenny Parr; England | |
| 2002 | Charan Singh; India | | Timothy Lowndes; Australia | | Samuel Wieland; Australia | |
| 2006 | (India) Gagan Narang (IND) | | (India) Abhinav Bindra (IND) | | (Australia) Benjamin Burge (AUS) | |
| 2010 | Gagan Narang; India | | Jonathan Hammond; Scotland | | James Huckle; England | |
| 2014 | Daniel Rivers; England | | Sanjeev Rajput; India | | Gagan Narang; India | |

=== 50 metre small bore rifle three positions pairs ===
| Games | Gold | | Silver | | Bronze | |
|---|---|---|---|---|---|---|
| 1982 | Malcolm Cooper; Barry Dagger; England | 2301 | Guy Lorion; Jean-François Sénécal; Canada | 2279 | Alister Allan; Bill MacNeill; Scotland | 2277 |
| 1986 | England; Malcolm Cooper; Sarah Cooper | 2278 | Canada; Jean-François Sénécal; Michael Dion | 2276 | Scotland; Alister Allan; Bill MacNeill | 2241 |
| 1990 | Canada; Jean-François Sénécal; Mart Klepp | 2272 | England; Malcolm Cooper; Robert Smith | 2268 | Scotland; William Murray; Robert Law | 2258 |
| 1994 | Wayne Sorensen; Michael Dion; Canada | 2300 | Alister Allan; William Murray; Scotland | 2271 | Chris Hector; Trevor Langridge; England | 2259 |
| 1998 | Michael Dion; Wayne Sorensen; Canada | | Les Imgrund; Tim Lowndes; Australia | | Chris Hector; Kenny Parr; England | |
| 2002 | Timothy Lowndes; Samuel Wieland; Australia | | Jason Burrage; Chris Hector; England | | Subbaiah Airira Pemmaiah; Charan Singh; India | |
| 2006 | (India) Abhinav Bindra (IND) (India) Gagan Narang (IND) | | (Australia) Michael Brown (AUS) (Australia) Benjamin Burge (AUS) | | (England) Jason Burrage (ENG) (England) Chris Hector (ENG) | |
| 2010 | Imran Hassan Khan; Gagan Narang; India | | James Huckle; Kenneth Parr; England | | Jonathan Hammond; Neil Stirton; Scotland | |

== Men's shotgun ==
=== Clay pigeon trap ===
| Games | Gold | Silver | Bronze |
|---|---|---|---|
| 1998 | Michael Diamond; Australia | Ian Peel; England | Des Coe; New Zealand |

=== Skeet ===
| Games | Gold | | Silver | | Bronze | |
|---|---|---|---|---|---|---|
| 1974 | Harry Willsie; Canada | 194 | Joe Neville; England | 191 | Robin Bailey; Australia | 189 |
| 1978 | John Woolley; New Zealand | 193 | Paul Bentley; England | 191 | Joe Neville; England | 190 |
| 1982 | John Woolley; New Zealand | 197 | Ian Hale; Australia | 196 | Wally Sykes; England | 195 |
| 1986 | Nigel Kelly; Isle of Man | 196 | Joe Neville; England; Brian Gabriel; Canada | 195 | | |
| 1990 | Ken Harman; England | 187 | Georgios Sakellis; Cyprus | 187 | Andrew Austin; England | 184 |
| 1994 | Ian Hale; Australia | 144 | Christos Kourtellas; Cyprus | 143 | Andrew Austin; England | 143 |
| 1998 | Desmond Davies; Wales | | Joe Trinci; Canada | | David Cunningham; Australia | |
| 2002 | Clayton Miller; Canada | | Michael Thomson; Scotland | | Antonis Nikolaidis; Cyprus | |
| 2006 | (Cyprus) Georgios Achilleos (CYP) | | (Australia) Clive Barton (AUS) | | (Canada) Clayton Miller (CAN) | |
| 2010 | Richard Brickell; England | | Georgios Achilleos; Cyprus | | Andreas Chasikos; Cyprus | |
| 2014 | Georgios Achilleos; Cyprus | | Drew Christie; Scotland | | Rory Warlow; England | |

=== Skeet pairs ===
| Games | Gold | | Silver | | Bronze | |
|---|---|---|---|---|---|---|
| 1982 | Brian Gabriel; Fred Altmann; Canada | 191 | Jim Sheffield; Wally Sykes; England | 190 | Alec Crikis; Ian Hale; Australia | 190 |
| 1986 | England; Joe Neville; Ken Harman | 195 | Canada; Brian Gabriel; Don Kwasnycia | 193 | New Zealand; John Woolley; John Farrell | 189 |
| 1990 | Scotland; Ian Marsden; James Dunlop | 189 | England; Andrew Austin; Ken Harman | 185 | New Zealand; Tim Dodds; John Woolley | 183 |
| 1994 | Antonakis Andreou; Christos Kourtellas; Cyprus | 189 | Brian Thomson; Geoffrey Jukes; New Zealand | 186 | Michael Thomson; Ian Marsden; Scotland | 186 |
| 1998 | Costas Stratis; Antonis Nikolaidis; Cyprus | | Andrew Austin; Drew Harvey; England | | Douglas McCutcheon; Joe Trinci; Canada | |
| 2002 | Christos Kourtellas; Antonis Nikolaidis; Cyprus | | George Barton; David Cunningham; Australia | | Richard Brickell; Drew Harvey; England | |
| 2006 | (Cyprus) Georgios Achilleos (CYP) (Cyprus) Antonis Nikolaidis (CYP) | | (England) Clive Bramley (ENG) (England) Richard Brickell (ENG) | | (Australia) Clive Barton (AUS) (Australia) George Barton (AUS) | |
| 2010 | Georgios Achilleos; Andreas Chasikos; Cyprus | | Jason Caswell; Richard McBride; Canada | | Richard Brickell; Clive Bramley; England | |

=== Trap ===
| Games | Gold | | Silver | | Bronze | |
|---|---|---|---|---|---|---|
| 1974 | John Primrose; Canada | 196 | Brian Bailey; England | 193 | Philip Lewis; Wales | 191 |
| 1978 | John Primrose; Canada | 186 | George Leary; Canada | 185 | Terry Rumbel; Australia | 183 |
| 1982 | Peter Boden; England | 191 | Terry Rumbel; Australia | 190 | Peter Croft; England | 190 |
| 1986 | Ian Peel; England | 195 | Peter Boden; England | 192 | Roland Phillips; Wales | 192 |
| 1990 | John Maxwell; Australia | 184 | Kevin Gill; England | 183 | Ian Peel; England | 179 |
| 1994 | Mansher Singh; India | 141 | George Leary; Canada | 140 | Andreas Angelou; Cyprus | 137 |
| 1998 | Michael Diamond; Australia | | Ian Peel; England | | Des Coe; New Zealand | |
| 2002 | Michael Diamond; Australia | | Adam Vella; Australia | | Anwer Sultan; India | |
| 2006 | (New Zealand) Graeme Ede (NZL) | | (Northern Ireland) David Beattie (NIR) | | (India) Manavjit Singh Sandhu (IND) | |
| 2010 | Aaron Heading; England | | Michael Diamond; Australia | | Manavjit Singh Sandhu; India | |
| 2014 | Adam Vella; Australia | | Aaron Heading; England | | Manavjit Singh Sandhu; India | |

=== Trap pairs ===
| Games | Gold | | Silver | | Bronze | |
|---|---|---|---|---|---|---|
| 1982 | Jim Ellis; Terry Rumbel; Australia | 190 | Peter Croft; Peter Boden; England | 186 | James Young; Martin Girvan; Scotland | 183 |
| 1986 | England; Peter Boden; Ian Peel | 185 | Northern Ireland; Tom Hewitt; Eamon Furphy | 183 | Australia; Terry Rumbel; Domingo Diaz | 183 |
| 1990 | England; Kevin Gill; Ian Peel | 181 | Wales; Colin Evans; James Birkett-Evans | 178 | Australia; Russell Mark; John Maxwell | 178 |
| 1994 | Tom Hewitt; Samuel Allen; Northern Ireland | 188 | Ron Bonotto; George Leary; Canada | 187 | Bob Borsley; John Grice; England | 186 |
| 1998 | Mansher Singh; Manavjit Singh Sandhu; India | | Michael Diamond; Ben Kelley; Australia | | Bob Borsley; Ian Peel; England | |
| 2002 | Michael Diamond; Adam Vella; Australia | | Christopher Dean; Ian Peel; England | | James Birkett-Evans; Michael Wixey; Wales | |
| 2006 | (Australia) Michael Diamond (AUS) (Australia) Adam Vella (AUS) | | (Canada) Tye Warner Bietz (CAN) (Canada) Kirk Reynolds (CAN) | | (Isle of Man) Trevor Boyles (IOM) (Isle of Man) David Walton (IOM) | |
| 2010 | Michael Diamond; Adam Vella; Australia | | Manavjit Singh Sandhu; Mansher Singh; India | | Aaron Heading; Dave Kirk; England | |

=== Double trap ===
| Games | Gold | Silver | Bronze |
|---|---|---|---|
| 2002 | Rajyavardhan Singh Rathore; India | Russell Mark; Australia | William Chetcuti; Malta |
| 2006 | (India) Rajyavardhan Singh Rathore (IND) | (South Africa) Byron Swanton (RSA) | (Malta) William Chetcuti (MLT) |
| 2010 | Stevan Walton; England | Ronjan Sodhi; India | Tim Kneale; Isle of Man |
| 2014 | Steven Scott; England | Matthew French; England | Mohammed Asab; India |

=== Double trap pairs ===
| Games | Gold | Silver | Bronze |
|---|---|---|---|
| 2002 | India; Moraad Ali Khan; Rajyavardhan Singh Rathore | Australia; Michael Diamond; Russell Mark | England; John Bellamy; Richard Faulds |
| 2006 | Australia; Russell Mark; Craig Trembath | India; Vikram Bhatnagar; Rajyavardhan Singh Rathore | England; Richard Faulds (England) Stevan Walton |
| 2010 | England; Steven Scott; Stevan Walton | India; Asher Noria; Ronjan Sodhi | Malaysia; Seng Chye; Benjamin Khor |

== Mixed events ==
=== Full bore Queen's prize individual ===
| Games | Gold | | Silver | | Bronze | |
|---|---|---|---|---|---|---|
| 1966 | Lord John Swansea; Wales | 394 | (Papua New Guinea) Robert Stewart (PNG) | 381 | Tom Sutherland; New Zealand | 381 |
| 1974 | Maurie Gordon; New Zealand | 387.26 | Colin McEachran; Scotland | 386.27 | James Spaight; England | 383.35 |
| 1978 | Desmond Vamplew; Canada | 391 | James Spaight; England | 388 | Patrick Vamplew; Canada | 387 |
| 1982 | Arthur Clarke; Scotland | 387 | Lord John Swansea; Wales | 385 | Charles Trotter; Guernsey | 384 |
| 1986 | Stan Golinski; Australia | 396 | Alain Marion; Canada | 396 | John Bloomfield; England | 395 |
| 1990 | Colin Mallett; Jersey | 394 | Andrew Tucker; England | 390 | James Corbett; Australia | 390 |
| 1994 | David Calvert; Northern Ireland | 398 | Geoffrey Smith; New Zealand | 398 | Glyn Barnett; England | 397 |
| 1998 | James Paton; Canada | | Zainal Abidin Md Zain; Malaysia | | Andrew Luckman; England | |
| 2002 | David Calvert; Northern Ireland | | David Dodds; South Africa | | Diane Collings; New Zealand | |
| 2006 | (Australia) Bruce Scott (AUS) | | (England) Parag Patel (ENG) | | (Australia) James Corbett (AUS) | |
| 2010 | Parag Patel; England | | James Corbett; Australia | | David Calvert; Northern Ireland | |
| 2014 details | David Luckman; England | | James Paton; Canada | | Parag Patel; England | |

=== Full bore Queen's prize pairs ===
| Games | Gold | | Silver | | Bronze | |
|---|---|---|---|---|---|---|
| 1982 | Keith Affleck; Geoffrey Ayling; Australia | 572 | John Bloomfield; Dick Rosling; England | 570 | David Calvert; Hazel Mackintosh; Northern Ireland | 563 |
| 1986 | Canada; Bill Baldwin; Alain Marion | 583 | Australia; James Corbett; Stan Golinski | 583 | Northern Ireland; David Calvert; Martin Millar | 582 |
| 1990 | England; Simon Belither; Andrew Tucker | 580 | Australia; James Corbett; Barry Wood | 565 | Jersey; Clifford Mallett; Colin Mallett | 564 |
| 1994 | Bert Bowden; Geoffrey Grenfell; Australia | 593 | Glyn Barnett; Antony Ringer; England | 588 | David Calvert; Martin Millar; Northern Ireland | 584 |
| 1998 | David Calvert; Martin Millar; Northern Ireland | | James Paton; Alain Marion; Canada | | David Davies; Christopher Hockley; Wales | |
| 2002 | David Calvert; Martin Millar; Northern Ireland | | Peter Bramley; David Dodds; South Africa | | Glyn Barnett; Jane Messer; England | |
| 2006 | (England) Glyn Barnett (ENG); Parag Patel (ENG) | | (Australia) James Corbett (Australia) Bruce Scott (AUS) | | (Malaysia) Md Zainal Abidin Bin; Hamsan Zulkeflee Bin | |
| 2010 | Mike Collings; John Snowden; New Zealand | | Angus McLeod; Ian Shaw; Scotland | | Jon Underwood; Parag Patel; England | |
| 2014 details | England; David Luckman; Parag Patel | | Canada; James Paton; Desmond Vamplew | | Scotland; Angus McLeod; Ian Shaw | |

== Women's pistol ==
=== 25 metre sport pistol ===
| Games | Gold | Silver | Bronze |
|---|---|---|---|
| 1994 | Christine Trefry; Australia | Margaret Thomas; England | Annette Woodward; Australia |
| 1998 | Christine Trefry; Australia | Bibiana Ng; Malaysia | Kim Eagles; Canada |
| 2002 | Lalita Yauhleuskaya; Australia | Linda Ryan; Australia | Jocelyn Lees; New Zealand |
| 2006 | Lalita Yauhleuskaya; Australia | Sushma Rana; India | Kim Eagles; Canada |
| 2010 | Anisa Sayyed; India | Rahi Sarnobat; India | Bibiana Ng; Malaysia |
| 2014 | Rahi Sarnobat; India | Anisa Sayyed; India | Lalita Yauhleuskaya; Australia |

=== 25 metre sport pistol pairs ===
| Games | Gold | Silver | Bronze |
|---|---|---|---|
| 1994 | Christine Trefry; Annette Woodward; Australia | Sharon Cozzarin; Helen Smith; Canada | Margaret Thomas; Carol Page; England |
| 1998 | Christine Trefry; Annette Woodward; Australia | Tania Corrigan; Jocelyn Lees; New Zealand | Bibiana Ng; Norsita Mahmud; Malaysia |
| 2002 | Linda Ryan; Lalita Yauhleuskaya; Australia | Irina Maharani; Bibiana Ng; Malaysia | Tania Corrigan; Jocelyn Lees; New Zealand |
| 2006 | (India) Saroja Jhuthu (IND) (India) Sushma Rana (IND) | (Australia) Pamela Mckenzie (AUS) (Australia) Lalita Yauhleuskaya (AUS) | (Canada) Avianna Chao (CAN) (Canada) Kim Eagles (CAN) |
| 2010 | Rahi Sarnobat; Anisa Sayyed; India | Linda Ryan; Lalita Yauhleuskaya; Australia | Georgina Geikie; Julia Lydall; England |

=== 10 metre air pistol ===
| Games | Gold | Silver | Bronze |
|---|---|---|---|
| 1994 | Helen Smith; Canada | Annette Woodward; Australia | Sharon Cozzarin; Canada |
| 1998 | Annemarie Forder; Australia | Christine Trefry; Australia | Tania Corrigan; New Zealand |
| 2002 | Lalita Yauhleuskaya; Australia | Dorothy Ludwig; Canada | Annemarie Forder; Australia |
| 2006 | Lalita Yauhleuskaya; Australia | Dina Aspandiyarova; Australia | Kim Eagles; Canada |
| 2010 | Bibiana Ng; Malaysia | Heena Sidhu; India | Dina Aspandiyarova; Australia |
| 2014 | Teo Shun Xie; Singapore | Malaika Goel; India | Dorothy Ludwig; Canada |

=== 10 metre air pistol pairs ===
| Games | Gold | Silver | Bronze |
|---|---|---|---|
| 1994 | Annette Woodward; Christine Trefry; Australia | Jocelyn Lees; Gerd Barkman; New Zealand | Margaret Thomas; Carol Page; England |
| 1998 | Annemarie Forder; Christine Trefry; Australia | Tania Corrigan; Jocelyn Lees; New Zealand | Kamisah Abdul Jalal; Suriani Othman; Malaysia |
| 2002 | Kim Eagles; Dorothy Ludwig; Canada | Shweta Chaudhary; Sheila Kanungo; India | Annemarie Forder; Lalita Yauhleuskaya; Australia |
| 2006 | Dina Aspandiyarova; Lalita Yauhleuskaya; Australia | Joseline Lee Yean Cheah; Bibiana Ng; Malaysia | Georgina Geikie; Julia Lydall; England |
| 2010 | Heena Sidhu; Annu Raj Singh; India | Dina Aspandiyarova; Pamela McKinzie; Australia | Dorothy Ludwig; Lynda Hare; Canada |

== Women's rifle ==
=== 50 metre small bore rifle prone ===
| Games | Gold | Silver | Bronze |
|---|---|---|---|
| 1994 | Shirley McIntosh; Scotland | Sylvia Purdie; Australia | Patricia Littlechild; Scotland |
| 1998 | Roopa Unnikrishnan; India | Carrie Quigley; Australia | Sally Johnston; New Zealand |
| 2002 | Kim Frazer; Australia | Esmari van Reenen; South Africa | Juliet Etherington; New Zealand |
| 2006 | Sheena Sharp; Scotland | Juliet Etherington; New Zealand | Johanne Brekke; Wales |
| 2010 | Jennifer McIntosh; Scotland | Tejaswini Sawant; India | Johanne Brekke; Wales |
| 2014 | Sally Johnston; New Zealand | Esmari van Reenen; South Africa | Jennifer McIntosh; Scotland |

=== 50 metre small bore rifle prone pairs ===
| Games | Gold | Silver | Bronze |
|---|---|---|---|
| 1994 | Kim Frazer; Sylvia Purdie; Australia | Shirley McIntosh; Patricia Littlechild; Scotland | Christina Ashcroft; Linda Szulga; Canada |
| 1998 | Carrie Quigley; Kim Frazer; Australia | Christina Ashcroft; Maureen Spinney; Canada | Susan Bell; Shirley McIntosh; Scotland |
| 2002 | Johanne Brekke; Ceri Dallimore; Wales | Susan Jackson; Sheena Sharp; Scotland | Linda Smallbone; Helen Vincent; England |
| 2006 | Susan Jackson; Sheena Sharp; Scotland | Sharon Lee; Helen Spittles; England | Juliet Etherington; Kathryn Mead; New Zealand |
| 2010 | Jennifer McIntosh; Kay Copland; Scotland | Michelle Smith; Sharon Lee; England | Meena Kumari; Tejaswini Sawant; India |

=== 50 metre small bore rifle three positions ===
| Games | Gold | Silver | Bronze |
|---|---|---|---|
| 1994 | Sharon Bowes; Canada | Roopa Unnikrishnan; India | Christina Ashcroft; Canada |
| 1998 | Sue McCready; Australia | Sharon Bowes; Canada | Roslina Bakar; Malaysia |
| 2002 | Anjali Bhagwat; India | Raj Kumari; India | Roslina Bakar; Malaysia |
| 2006 | (India) Anuja Jung (IND) | (South Africa) Esmari van Reenen (RSA) | (Malaysia) Mohamed Nur Suryani Binti (MAS) |
| 2010 | Alethea Sedgman; Australia | Ser Xiang Wei Jasmine; Singapore | Aqilah Binte Sudhir; Singapore |
| 2014 | Jasmine Ser; Singapore | Jennifer McIntosh; Scotland | Lajja Goswami; India |

=== 50 metre small bore rifle three positions pairs ===
| Games | Gold | Silver | Bronze |
|---|---|---|---|
| 1994 | Sharon Bowes; Christina Ashcroft; Canada | Karen Morton; Lindsay Volpin; England | Roopa Unnikrishnan; Kuheli Gangulee; India |
| 1998 | Sharon Bowes; Christina Ashcroft; Canada | Val Martin; Donna Potgieter; South Africa | Shirley McIntosh; Janis Thomson; Scotland |
| 2002 | Anjali Bhagwat; Raj Kumari; India | Sue McCready; Susannah Smith; Australia | Sharon Bowes; Cari Johnson; Canada |
| 2006 | (England) Louise Minett (ENG) (England) Becky Spicer (ENG) | (India) Anjali Bhagwat (IND) (India) Anuja Jung (IND) | (Malaysia) Mohamed Nur Suryani Binti (MAS) (Malaysia) Baharin Nurul Hudda Binti (MAS) |
| 2010 | Ser Xiang Wei Jasmine; Aqilah Binte Sudhir; Singapore | Lajja Goswami; Tejaswini Sawant; India | Kay Copland; Jennifer McIntosh; Scotland |

=== 10 metre air rifle ===
| Games | Gold | Silver | Bronze |
|---|---|---|---|
| 1994 | Photini Theophanous; Cyprus | Malini Wickramasinghe; Sri Lanka | Sharon Bowes; Canada |
| 1998 | Nurul Huda Baharin; Malaysia | Sharon Bowes; Canada | Louise Minett; England |
| 2002 | Anjali Bhagwat; India | Suma Shirur; India | Louise Minett; England |
| 2006 | Tejaswini Sawant; India | Avneet Sidhu; India | Yu Zhen Vanessa Yong; Singapore |
| 2010 | Ser Xiang Wei Jasmine; Singapore | Ayuni Halim; Malaysia | Nur Suryani Taibi; Malaysia |
| 2014 | Apurvi Chandela; India | Ayonika Paul; India | Nur Suryani Taibi; Malaysia |

=== 10 metre air rifle pairs ===
| Games | Gold | Silver | Bronze |
|---|---|---|---|
| 1994 | Pushpamali Ramanayake; Malini Wickramasinghe; Sri Lanka | Karen Morton; Louise Minett; England | Christina Ashcroft; Sharon Bowes; Canada |
| 1998 | Christina Ashcroft; Sharon Bowes; Canada | Belinda Muehlberg; Noemi Rostas; Australia | Louise Minett; Rebecca Spicer; England |
| 2002 | Anjali Bhagwat; Suma Shirur; India | Sharon Bowes; Jacklyn Mecredy; Canada | Victoria Eaton; Louise Minett; England |
| 2006 | (India) Tejaswini Sawant (IND) (India) Avneet Sidhu (IND) | (Canada) Monica Fyfe (CAN) (Canada) Cynthia Hamulau (CAN) | (Singapore) Yu Zhen Vanessa Yong (SIN) (Singapore) Jing Zhang (SIN) |
| 2010 | Nur Suryani Taibi; Ayuni Halim; Malaysia | Ser Xiang Wei Jasmine; Cheng Jian Huan; Singapore | Suma Shirur; Kavita Yadav; India |

== Women's shotgun ==
=== Trap ===
| Games | Gold | Silver | Bronze |
|---|---|---|---|
| 2006 | (South Africa) Diane Swanton (RSA) | (Malta) Rebecca Madyson (MLT) | (New Zealand) Teresa Borrell (NZL) |
| 2010 | Anita North; England | Shona Marshall; Scotland | Gaby Ahrens; Namibia |
| 2014 | Laetisha Scanlan; Australia | Georgia Konstantinidou; Cyprus | Caroline Povey; England |

=== Trap pairs ===
| Games | Gold | Silver | Bronze |
|---|---|---|---|
| 2006 | (Australia) Suzanne Balogh (AUS) (Australia) Deserie Baynes (AUS) | (Canada) Cynthia Meyer (CAN) (Canada) Susan Nattrass (CAN) | (New Zealand) Teresa Borrell (NZL) (New Zealand) Nadine Stanton (NZL) |
| 2010 | Laetisha Scanlan; Stacy Roiall; Australia | Abbey Burton; Anita North; England | Cynthia Meyer; Susan Nattrass; Canada |

=== Clay pigeon trap ===
| Games | Gold | Silver | Bronze |
|---|---|---|---|
| 2002 | Cynthia Meyer; Canada | Anita North; England | Susan Nattrass; Canada |

=== Clay pigeon trap pairs ===
| Games | Gold | Silver | Bronze |
|---|---|---|---|
| 2002 | Nessa Jenkins; Diane Reeves; Australia | Lesley Goddard; Anita North; England | Cynthia Meyer; Susan Nattrass; Canada |

=== Double trap ===
| Games | Gold | Silver | Bronze |
|---|---|---|---|
| 2002 | Charlotte Kerwood; England | Nadine Stanton; New Zealand | Cynthia Meyer; Canada |
| 2006 | Charlotte Kerwood; England | Rachel Parish; England | Cynthia Barbara; Canada |
| 2014 | Charlotte Kerwood; England | Shreyasi Singh; India | Rachel Parish; England |

=== Double trap pairs ===
| Games | Gold | Silver | Bronze |
|---|---|---|---|
| 2002 | Teresa Borrell; Nadine Stanton; New Zealand | Cynthia Meyer; Susan Nattrass; Canada | Suzanne Balogh; Susan Trindall; Australia |
| 2006 | Charlotte Kerwood; Rachel Parish; England | Cynthia Meyer; Susan Nattrass; Canada | Suzanne Balogh; Susan Trindall; Australia |

=== Skeet ===
| Games | Gold | Silver | Bronze |
|---|---|---|---|
| 2002 | Lauryn Ogilvie; Australia | Natalia Rahman; Australia | Edith Barnes; Scotland |
| 2006 | Andri Eleftheriou; Cyprus | Lauryn Mark; Australia | Pinky Le Grelle; England |
| 2014 | Laura Coles; Australia | Elena Allen; Wales | Andri Eleftheriou; Cyprus |

=== Skeet pairs ===
| Games | Gold | Silver | Bronze |
|---|---|---|---|
| 2002 | Lauryn Ogilvie; Natalia Rahman; Australia | none awarded^{[a]} | none awarded^{[a]} |
| 2006 | Lauryn Mark; Natalia Rahman; Australia | Andri Eleftheriou; Louiza Theophanous; Cyprus | Pinky Le Grelle; Elena Little; England |
