= Shooting at the 1994 Commonwealth Games =

- Venue: Heal's Range, Wallace Drive
- Location: Victoria, Canada
- Dates: 18 to 28 August 1994

Shooting at the 1994 Commonwealth Games was the seventh appearance of Shooting at the Commonwealth Games. The events were held in Victoria, Canada, from 18 to 28 August 1994 and featured a record 32 events (an increase of 10 from 1990).

The shooting events were held at Heal's Range, off Wallace Drive, approximately 15km north of the centre of Victoria. The facility was owned by the Department of National Defence and was 17km from the athletes' village, set in a natural valley. It made use of an existing 1,000 yard fullbore range but added trap, skeet, smallbore, pistol and air rifle ranges specifically for the Games.

Australia topped the shooting medal table by virtue of winning ten gold medals.

== Medal table ==
* Host nation (Canada)

Medals won by nation with totals, ranked by number of golds—sortable
Rank	Nation	Gold	Silver	Bronze	Total
1	Australia	10	5	4	19
2	Canada*	8	7	7	22
3	India	3	2	2	7
4	England	2	7	8	17
5	New Zealand	2	4	3	9
6	Cyprus	2	1	1	4
7	Northern Ireland	2	0	1	3
8	Scotland	1	2	4	7
9	Sri Lanka	1	2	0	3
10	Wales	1	1	0	2
11	Guernsey	0	0	1	1
Totals (11 entries)		32	31	31	94

== Medallists ==
=== Pistol ===
Event	Gold		Silver		Bronze	
Men/Open
50m Free Pistol	Mick Gault; England	654.1	Phil Adams; Australia	647	Bengt Sandstrom; Australia	642.5
50m Free Pistol – Pairs	Phil Adams; Bengt Sandström; Australia	1104	Julian Lawton; Greg Yelavich; New Zealand	1094	Mick Gault; Paul Leatherdale; England	1082
25m Centre-Fire Pistol	Jaspal Rana; India	581	Mick Gault; England	581	Greg Yelavich; New Zealand	575
25m Centre-Fire Pistol – Pairs	Jaspal Rana; Ashok Pandit; India	1168	Kelvin Vickers; Phil Adams; Australia	1149	Stanley Wills; John Rochon; Canada	1148
25m Rapid-Fire Pistol	Michael Jay; Wales	670.2	Robert Dowling; Australia	668.4	Pat Murray; Australia	668.1
25m Rapid-Fire Pistol – Pairs	Pat Murray; Robert Dowling; Australia	1148	Richard Craven; Michael Jay; Wales	1142	Adrian Breton; Graham La Maitre; Guernsey	1129
10m Air Pistol	Jean-Pierre Huot; Canada	672.4	Jaspal Rana; India	670.7	Greg Yelavich; New Zealand	668.5
10m Air Pistol – Pairs	Mike Giustiniano; Bengt Sandström; Australia	1137	Jean-Pierre Huot; John Rochon; Canada	1135	Jaspal Rana; Vivek Singh; India	1133
Women
25m Sport Pistol	Christine Trefry; Australia	679.4	Margaret Thomas; England	675	Annette Woodward; Australia	674
25m Sport Pistol – Pairs	Christine Trefry; Annette Woodward; Australia	1134	Sharon Cozzarin; Helen Smith; Canada	1132	Margaret Thomas; Carol Page; England	1129
10m Air Pistol	Helen Smith; Canada	474.2	Annette Woodward; Australia	466.1	Sharon Cozzarin; Canada	465.8
10m Air Pistol – Pairs	Annette Woodward; Christine Trefry; Australia	747	Jocelyn Lees; Gerd Barkman; New Zealand	745	Margaret Thomas; Carol Page; England	744

=== Rifle ===
Event	Gold		Silver		Bronze	
Men/Open
50m Rifle Prone	Stephen Petterson; New Zealand	698.4	Jim Cornish; England	693.9	Michael Dion; Canada	693.6
50m Rifle Prone – Pairs	Stephen Petterson; Lindsay Arthur; New Zealand	1181	Dodangoda Chandrasiri; Lakshman Rajasinghe; Sri Lanka	1177	David Clifton; Dean Turley; Australia	1176
50m Rifle Three Positions	Michel Dion; Canada	1234.2	Wayne Sorensen; Canada	1228.7	Alister Allan; Scotland	1224.8
50m Rifle Three Positions – Pairs	Wayne Sorensen; Michel Dion; Canada	2300	Alister Allan; Bill Murray; Scotland	2271	Chris Hector; Trevor Langridge; England	2259
Full Bore Rifle	David Calvert; Northern Ireland	398	Geoffrey Smith; New Zealand	398	Glyn Barnett; England	397
Full Bore Rifle – Pairs	Bert Bowden; Geoffrey Grenfell; Australia	593	Glyn Barnett; Antony Ringer; England	588	David Calvert; Martin Millar; Northern Ireland	584
10m Air Rifle	Chris Hector; England	685.9	Jean-François Sénécal; Canada	683	Nigel Wallace; England	680
10m Air Rifle – Pairs	Jean-François Sénécal; Wayne Sorensen; Canada	1166	Chris Hector; Nigel Wallace; England	1161	David Rattray; Robin Law; Scotland	1145
10m Running Target	Bryan Wilson; Australia	657.9	Mark Bedlington; Canada	656	Paul Carmine; New Zealand	650.7
10m Running Target – Pairs	Mark Bedlington; Matthew Bedlington; Canada	1088	Not awarded (only 3 entries)			
Women
50m Rifle Prone	Shirley McIntosh; Scotland	586	Sylvia Purdie; Australia	585	Patricia Littlechild; Scotland	585
50m Small Bore Rifle Prone – Pairs	Kim Frazer; Sylvia Purdie; Australia	1160	Shirley McIntosh; Patricia Littlechild; Scotland	1158	Christina Ashcroft; Linda Szulga; Canada	1158
50m Small Bore Rifle Three Positions	Sharon Bowes; Canada	666.4	Roopa Unnikrishnan; India	662.5	Christina Ashcroft; Canada	661.6
50m Small Bore Rifle Three Positions – Pairs	Sharon Bowes; Christina Ashcroft; Canada	1143	Karen Morton; Lindsay Volpin; England	1132	Roopa Unnikrishnan; Kuheli Gangulee; India	1110
10m Air Rifle	Photini Theophanous; Cyprus	488.7	Malini Wickramasinghe; Sri Lanka	488.5	Sharon Bowes; Canada	488.4
10m Air Rifle – Pairs	Pushpamali Ramanayake; Malini Wickramasinghe; Sri Lanka	771	Karen Morton; Louise Minett; England	771	Christina Ashcroft; Sharon Bowes; Canada	766

=== Shotgun ===
Event	Gold		Silver		Bronze	
Men/Open
Trap	Mansher Singh; India	141	George Leary; Canada	140	Andreas Angelou; Cyprus	137
Trap – Pairs	Tom Hewitt; Samuel Allen; Northern Ireland	188	Ron Bonotto; George Leary; Canada	187	Bob Borsley; John Grice; England	186
Skeet	Ian Hale; Australia	144	Christos Kourtellas; Cyprus	143	Andy Austin; England	143
Skeet – Pairs	Antonakis Andreou; Christos Kourtellas; Cyprus	189	Brian Thomson; Geoffrey Jukes; New Zealand	186	Mike Thomson; Ian Marsden; Scotland	186

== See also ==
- List of Commonwealth Games medallists in shooting
