= Shooting at the 1998 Commonwealth Games =

- Venue: Langkawi International Shooting Range (Lisram)
- Location: Kedah, Malaysia
- Dates: 11 to 21 September 1998

Shooting at the 1998 Commonwealth Games was the eighth appearance of Shooting at the Commonwealth Games. Although the Commonwealth Games events were held in Kuala Lumpur, Malaysia, from 11 to 21 September 1998, the shooting events took place in Kedah and featured 30 disciplines (a decrease of 2 from 1994).

The shooting events were held at the Langkawi International Shooting Range in Kedah, off the newly constructed LISRAM Highway, approximately 500km from Kuala Lumpur.

Australia topped the shooting medal table by virtue of winning nine gold medals.

== Medal table ==
* Host nation (Malaysia)

Medals won by nation with totals, ranked by number of golds—sortable
Rank	Nation	Gold	Silver	Bronze	Total
1	Australia	9	7	5	21
2	England	6	3	6	15
3	Canada	5	7	5	17
4	India	4	2	1	7
5	Malaysia*	1	4	3	8
6	South Africa	1	4	2	7
7	New Zealand	1	3	4	8
8	Wales	1	0	1	2
9	Cyprus	1	0	0	1
9	Northern Ireland	1	0	0	1
11	Scotland	0	0	3	3
Totals (11 entries)		30	30	30	90

== Medallists ==
=== Pistol ===
Event	Gold	Silver	Bronze
Men/Open
10m air pistol	Mick Gault; England	Jaspal Rana; India	Greg Yelavich; New Zealand
10m air pistol pairs	Nick Baxter and Mick Gault; England	Jaspal Rana and Satendra Kumar; India	John Rochon and Jean-Pierre Huot; Canada
10m air rifle	Chris Hector; England	Mohd Emran Zakaria; Malaysia	Zlatko Beneta; Australia
10m air rifle pairs	Chris Hector and Nigel Wallace; England	Abdul Mutalib Abdul Razak and Mohd Emran Zakaria; Malaysia	David Rattray and Robin Law; Scotland
25m centre-fire pistol	Jaspal Rana; India	Allan McDonald; South Africa	John Rochon; Canada
25 m centre-fire pistol pairs	Jaspal Rana and Ashok Pandit; India	John Rochon and Metodi Igorov; Canada	Mike Giustiniano and Bruce Quick; Australia
50m free pistol	Mick Gault; England	Francois Van Tonder; South Africa	Bruce Quick; Australia
50m free pistol pairs	Nick Baxter and Mick Gault; England	David Moore and Bruce Quick; Australia	John Rochon and Jean-Pierre Huot; Canada
Fullbore rifle Queens prize open	James Paton; Canada	Mohd Zainal Abidin Mohd Zain; Malaysia	Andrew Luckman; England
Fullbore rifle Queens prize open pairs	David Calvert and Martin Millar; Northern Ireland	James Paton and Alain Marion; Canada	David Davies and Christopher Hockley; Wales
Olympic trap	Michael Diamond; Australia	Ian Peel; England	Des Coe; New Zealand
Olympic trap pairs	Mansher Singh and Manavjit Singh; India	Michael Diamond and Ben Kelley; Australia	Bob Borsley and Ian Peel; England
25m rapid fire pistol	Metodi Igorov; Canada	Allan McDonald; South Africa	Bhanwar Dhaka; India
25m rapid fire pistol pairs	Mike Giustiniano and Pat Murray; Australia	Jason Wakeling and Alan Earle; New Zealand	Allan McDonald and André van Emmenis; South Africa
Skeet	Desmond Davies; Wales	Joe Trinci; Canada	David Cunningham; Australia
Skeet pairs	Costas Stratis and Antonis Nicolaides; Cyprus	Andy Austin and Drew Harvey; England	Douglas McCutcheon and Joe Trinci; Canada
50m rifle three-positions	Timothy Lowndes; Australia	Wayne Sorensen; Canada	Kenneth Parr; England
50m rifle three-positions pairs	Michael Dion and Wayne Sorensen; Canada	Les Imgrund and Tim Lowndes; Australia	Chris Hector and Kenneth Parr; England
50m rifle prone	Stephen Petterson; New Zealand	David William Moore; Isle of Man	Gavin van Rhyn; South Africa
50m rifle prone pairs	Gavin van Rhyn and Michael Thiele; South Africa	Philip Scanlan and Neil Day; England	Tim Lowndes and Warren Potent; Australia
Women
10m air pistol	Annemarie Forder; Australia	Christine Trefry; Australia	Tania Corrigan; New Zealand
10m air pistol pairs	Annemarie Forder and Christine Trefry; Australia	Tania Corrigan and Jocelyn Lees; New Zealand	Kamisah Abdul Jalal and Suriani Othman; Malaysia
10m air rifle	Nurul Huda Baharin; Malaysia	Sharon Bowes; Canada	Louise Minett; England
10m air rifle pairs	Christina Ashcroft and Sharon Bowes; Canada	Belinda Muehlberg and Noemi Rostas; Australia	Louise Minett and Becky Spicer; England
50m rifle prone	Roopa Unnikrishnan; India	Carrie Quigley; Australia	Sally Johnston; New Zealand
50m rifle prone pairs	Carrie Quigley and Kim Frazer; Australia	Christina Ashcroft and Maureen Spinney; Canada	Susan Bell and Shirley McIntosh; Scotland
50m rifle three-positions	Susan McCready; Australia	Sharon Bowes; Canada	Roslina Bakar; Malaysia
50m rifle three-positions pairs	Sharon Bowes and Christina Ashcroft; Canada	Val Martin and Donna Potgieter; South Africa	Shirley McIntosh and Janis Thomson; Scotland
25m sport pistol	Christine Trefry; Australia	Bibiana Ng Pei Chin; Malaysia	Kim Eagles; Canada
25m sport pistol pairs	Christine Trefry and Annette Woodward; Australia	Tania Corrigan and Jocelyn Lees; New Zealand	Bibiana Ng Pei Chin and Norsita Mahmud; Malaysia

== See also ==
- List of Commonwealth Games medallists in shooting
