= List of Malaysian records in shooting =

There are two different kinds of shooting records in Malaysia and certified by the National Shooting Association of Malaysia (NSAM):

- National record, more commonly referred to in Malaysia as the rekod kebangsaan: the best score recorded anywhere in the world by a sport shooter or team holding Malaysian citizenship.
- Malaysian All-Comers record: the best score recorded within Malaysia by a sport shooter or team regardless of nationality.

Key to tables:

Legend: # – Record awaiting ratification by National Shooting Association of Malaysia; WR – World record; AS – Asian record; CR – Commonwealth record

== Current Malaysian national records ==
=== Men ===
Event	Record	Athlete	Date	Meet	Place	Ref
Individual
50 m pistol	556	Alais Nee Sulong	2011		Subang, Malaysia	
10 m air rifle	623.0	Mohamad Lutfi Bin Othman	2018		Subang, Malaysia	
25 m air rapid fire pistol	585	Hafiz Adzha	2010		Subang, Malaysia	
25 m standard pistol	576	Hasli Izwan Amir Hasan	2010		Subang, Malaysia	
50 m rifle prone	597	Jasni Shaari	1994		Subang, Malaysia	
10 m air pistol	585	Johnathan Wong Guanjie	2015		Subang, Malaysia	
25 m center fire pistol	586	Hasli Izwan Amir Hasan	2010		Subang, Malaysia	
50 m rifle prone three positions	1162	Muhd Nurrahimin Abd Halim	2013		Subang, Malaysia	

Event	Record	Athlete	Date	Meet	Place	Ref
Team
50 m pistol	1612	Johnathan Wong Guanjie; Liew Tack Fai; Siau Zianyi	2015		Subang, Malaysia	
10 m air rifle	1830	Razi Aizat Adza; Ahmad Khusyairi Abdul Razak; Loo Jien Ren	2015		Subang, Malaysia	
25 m air rapid fire pistol	1690	Hasli Izwan Amir Hasan; Hafiz Adzha; Md Huzaimy Abd Jamil	2008		Subang, Malaysia	
25 m standard pistol	1663	Khalel Abdullah; Mohamad Ridhuan Mohamed; Khairul Azri Mohd Roslan	2012		Subang, Malaysia	
50 m rifle prone	1771	Jasni Shaari; Mohd Sabki Md Din; Ismail Diran	1994		Subang, Malaysia	
10 m air pistol	1719	Choo Wen Yan; Eddy Chew; Hazeq Haqeem R. Azmi	2014		Subang, Malaysia	
25 m center fire pistol	1713	Khairul Azri Mohd Roslan; Khalel Abdullah; Mohamad Ridhuan Mohamed	2012		Subang, Malaysia	
50 m rifle prone three positions	3434	Muhd Nurrahimin Abd Halim; Mohd Hassanul Adzhar Mohd Badrin; Muhd Nazirul Adzhar Abd Mutalib	2013		Subang, Malaysia	

=== Women ===
Event	Record	Athlete	Date	Meet	Place	Ref
Individual
10 m air rifle	418	Nur Ayuni Farhana Abd Halim	2015		Subang, Malaysia	
50 m rifle prone	596	Nur Suryani Taibi	2006		Subang, Malaysia	
10 m air pistol	388	Joseline Cheah Lee Yean	2013		Munich, Germany	
25 m pistol	587	Bibiana Ng Pei Chin	2012		Subang, Malaysia	
50 m rifle three positions	589	Nur Suryani Taibi	2005		Subang, Malaysia	

Event	Record	Athlete	Date	Meet	Place	Ref
Team
10 m air rifle	1237	Shahera Rahim Raja; Muslifah Zulkifli; Nur Suryani Taibi	2014		Subang, Malaysia	
50 m rifle prone	1774	Haslisa Hamed; Shahera Rahim Raja; Muslifah Zulkifli	2012		Subang, Malaysia	
10 m air pistol	1133	Bibiana Ng Pei Chin; Yan Seow Ping; Nurzaini Ismail	2007		Subang, Malaysia	
25 m pistol	1718	Suefarinawathy Effendi; Bibiana Ng Pei Chin; Haslinda Nosan	2002		Subang, Malaysia	
50 m rifle three positions	1747	Nur Suryani Taibi; Muslifah Zulkifli; Shahera Rahim Raja	2011		Subang, Malaysia	

== Current Malaysian national junior records ==
=== Men ===
Event	Record	Athlete	Date	Meet	Place	Ref
Individual
50 m pistol	554	Eddy Chew	2014		Beijing, China	
10 m air rifle	619	Zul Haziq Rosli	2016		Subang, Malaysia	
25 m air rapid fire pistol	570	Low Wei Chern	2016		Subang, Malaysia	
25 m standard pistol	565	Low Wei Chern	2016		Subang, Malaysia	
50 m rifle prone	596	Nik Muhammad A'imullah Supardi	2013		Singapore	
10 m air pistol	581	Choo Wen Yan	2014		Subang, Malaysia	
25 m center fire pistol	583	Liew Tack Fai	2012		Subang, Malaysia	
50 m rifle prone three positions	1162	Muhd Nurrahimin Abd Halim	2013		Subang, Malaysia	

Event	Record	Athlete	Date	Meet	Place	Ref
Team
50 m pistol	1593	Tan Tong Tat; Ng Chen Shin; Rishipal Singh Dhanoa	2016		Subang, Malaysia	
10 m air rifle	1818	Loo Jie Ren; Ahmad Khusyairi Abdul Razak; Muhd Farhan Adzha	2015		Subang, Malaysia	
25 m air rapid fire pistol	1663	Hafiz Adzha; Md Huzaimy Md Jamil; Md Saiful Md Shukor	2006		Subang, Malaysia	
25 m standard pistol	1642	Luqman Nul Hakim Rustan; Low Wei Chern; Syaidiq Hanif June Hassen	2016		Subang, Malaysia	
50 m rifle prone	1765	Muhamad Muhly Ibrahim Shah; Muhamad Shahril Sahak; Nik Muhammad A'imullah Supardi	2010		Subang, Malaysia	
10 m air pistol	1719	Choo Wen Yan; Eddy Chew; Hazeq Haqeem R. Azmi	2014		Subang, Malaysia	
25 m center fire pistol	1711	Choo Wen Yan; Eddy Chew; Nor Afiffuddin Nordin	2014		Subang, Malaysia	
50 m rifle prone three positions	3399	Muhd Nurrahimin Abd Halim; Mohd Hassanul Adzhar Mohd Badrin; Syed Muhd Haziquddin Syed Hamid	2012		Subang, Malaysia	

=== Women ===
Event	Record	Athlete	Date	Meet	Place	Ref
Individual
10 m air rifle	414	Nur Izazi Rosli	2015		Subang, Malaysia	
50 m rifle prone	591	Mariani Rafali	2006		Subang, Malaysia	
10 m air pistol	382	Joseline Cheah Lee Yean	2004		Subang, Malaysia	
25 m pistol	581	Alia Sazana Azahari	2012		Subang, Malaysia	
50 m rifle three positions	583	Nur Suryani Taibi	2002		Subang, Malaysia	

Event	Record	Athlete	Date	Meet	Place	Ref
Team
10 m air rifle	1220	Aida Natasya Md Rasip; Norliana Abu Naim; Nur Ain Kamari	2016		Subang, Malaysia	
50 m rifle prone	1757	Nur Aimi Hanis Abdul Halim; Nur Afifah Tarmizy; Nur Fatimah Azzahra Jamaludin	2016	Sukma Games	Sarawak, Malaysia	
10 m air pistol	1112	Siti Nur Masitah Mohd Badrin; Norerffani Abdul Malick; Siti Zubaidah Sukemi	2006		Subang, Malaysia	
25 m pistol	1703	Aida Amirah Mohd Sheriff; Nur Zunaira Zakaria; Nur Hidayah Zulkifli	2016		Subang, Malaysia	
50 m rifle three positions	1704	Nur Ain Ibrahim; Nur Ayuni Farhana Abd Halim; Nur Hariena Adzhar	2007		Sabah, Malaysia	

== Current Malaysian All-Comers records ==
=== Men ===
Event		Record	Athlete	Date	Meet	Place	Ref
Individual
50 m pistol	Qual.	556	Alais Nee Sulong (MAS)	2011		Subang, Malaysia	
50 m pistol	Final	646.3	Mick Gault (ENG)	1998	Commonwealth Games	Kuala Lumpur, Malaysia	
10 m air rifle	Qual.	623	Mohd Ezuan Nasir Khan (MAS)	2015		Subang, Malaysia	
10 m air rifle	Final	690.0	Christopher Hector (ENG)	1998	Commonwealth Games	Kuala Lumpur, Malaysia	
25 m air rapid fire pistol	Qual.	585	Hafiz Adzha (MAS)	2010		Subang, Malaysia	
25 m air rapid fire pistol	Final	674.8	Metodi Igorov (CAN)	1998	Commonwealth Games	Kuala Lumpur, Malaysia	
25 m standard pistol	Qual.	576	Hasli Izwan Amir Hasan (MAS)	2010		Subang, Malaysia	
25 m standard pistol	Final						
50 m rifle prone	Qual.	597	Jasni Shaari (MAS)	1994		Subang, Malaysia	
50 m rifle prone	Final	697.4	Stephen Petterson (NZL)	1998	Commonwealth Games	Kuala Lumpur, Malaysia	
10 m air pistol	Qual.	585	Johnathan Wong Guanjie (MAS)	2015		Subang, Malaysia	
10 m air pistol	Final	679.9	Mick Gault (ENG)	1998	Commonwealth Games	Kuala Lumpur, Malaysia	
25 m center fire pistol	Qual.	586	Hasli Izwan Amir Hasan (MAS)	2010		Subang, Malaysia	
25 m center fire pistol	Final	581	Jaspal Rana (IND)	1998	Commonwealth Games	Kuala Lumpur, Malaysia	
50 m rifle prone three positions	Qual.	1162	Muhd Nurrahimin Abd Halim (MAS)	2013		Subang, Malaysia	
50 m rifle prone three positions	Final	1235.3	Timothy Lowndes (AUS)	1998	Commonwealth Games	Kuala Lumpur, Malaysia	

Event	Record	Athlete	Date	Meet	Place	Ref
Pair
50 m pistol	1093	England; Mick Gault; Nick Baxter	1998	Commonwealth Games	Kuala Lumpur, Malaysia	
10 m air rifle	1173	England; Christopher Hector; Nigel Wallace	1998	Commonwealth Games	Kuala Lumpur, Malaysia	
25 m air rapid fire pistol	1138	Australia; Michelangelo Giustiniano; Patrick Brian Murray	1998	Commonwealth Games	Kuala Lumpur, Malaysia	
25 m standard pistol						
50 m rifle prone	1189	South Africa; Gavin Shawn van Rhyn; Michael Thiele	1998	Commonwealth Games	Kuala Lumpur, Malaysia	
10 m air pistol	1145	England; Mick Gault; Nick Baxter	1998	Commonwealth Games	Kuala Lumpur, Malaysia	
25 m center fire pistol	1154	India; Ashok Pandit; Jaspal Rana	1998	Commonwealth Games	Kuala Lumpur, Malaysia	
50 m rifle prone three positions	2276	Canada; Michel Dion; Wayne Sorenson	1998	Commonwealth Games	Kuala Lumpur, Malaysia	

Event	Record	Athlete	Date	Meet	Place	Ref
Team
50 m pistol	1612	Malaysia; Johnathan Wong Guanjie; Liew Tack Fai; Siau Zianyi	2015		Subang, Malaysia	
10 m air rifle	1830	Malaysia; Razi Aizat Adza; Ahmad Khusyairi Abdul Razak; Loo Jien Ren	2015		Subang, Malaysia	
25 m air rapid fire pistol	1690	Malaysia; Hasli Izwan Amir Hasan; Hafiz Adzha; Md Huzaimy Abd Jamil	2008		Subang, Malaysia	
25 m standard pistol	1663	Malaysia; Khalel Abdullah; Mohamad Ridhuan Mohamed; Khairul Azri Mohd Roslan	2012		Subang, Malaysia	
50 m rifle prone	1771	Malaysia; Jasni Shaari; Mohd Sabki Md Din; Ismail Diran	1994		Subang, Malaysia	
10 m air pistol	1719	Malaysia; Choo Wen Yan; Eddy Chew; Hazeq Haqeem R. Azmi	2014		Subang, Malaysia	
25 m center fire pistol	1713	Malaysia; Khairul Azri Mohd Roslan; Khalel Abdullah; Mohamad Ridhuan Mohamed	2012		Subang, Malaysia	
50 m rifle prone three positions	3434	Malaysia; Muhd Nurrahimin Abd Halim; Mohd Hassanul Adzhar Mohd Badrin; Muhd Nazirul Adzhar Abd Mutalib	2013		Subang, Malaysia	

=== Women ===
Event		Record	Athlete	Date	Meet	Place	Ref
Individual
10 m air rifle	Qual.	418	Nur Ayuni Farhana Abd Halim (MAS)	2015		Subang, Malaysia	
10 m air rifle	Final	494.8	Nurul Hudda Baharin (MAS)	1998	Commonwealth Games	Kuala Lumpur, Malaysia	
50 m rifle prone	Qual.	596	Nur Suryani Taibi (MAS)	2006		Subang, Malaysia	
50 m rifle prone	Final	590	Roopa Unnikrishnan (IND)	1998	Commonwealth Games	Kuala Lumpur, Malaysia	
10 m air pistol	Qual.	382	Joseline Cheah Lee Yean (MAS)	2004		Subang, Malaysia	
10 m air pistol	Final	480.6	Annemarie Forder (AUS)	1998	Commonwealth Games	Kuala Lumpur, Malaysia	
25 m pistol	Qual.	587	Bibiana Ng Pei Chin (MAS)	2012		Subang, Malaysia	
25 m pistol	Final	672.8	Christine Trefry (AUS)	1998	Commonwealth Games	Kuala Lumpur, Malaysia	
50 m rifle three positions	Qual.	589	Nur Suryani Taibi (MAS)	2005		Subang, Malaysia	
50 m rifle three positions	Final	667.3	Susan McCready (AUS)	1998	Commonwealth Games	Kuala Lumpur, Malaysia	

Event	Record	Athlete	Date	Meet	Place	Ref
Pair
10 m air rifle	778	Canada; Christina Ashcroft; Sharon Bowes	1998	Commonwealth Games	Kuala Lumpur, Malaysia	
50 m rifle prone	1174	Australia; Carolyn Quigley; Kim Frazer	1998	Commonwealth Games	Kuala Lumpur, Malaysia	
10 m air pistol	748	Australia; Annemarie Forder; Christine Trefry	1998	Commonwealth Games	Kuala Lumpur, Malaysia	
25 m pistol	1140	Australia; Annette Woodward; Christine Trefry	1998	Commonwealth Games	Kuala Lumpur, Malaysia	
50 m rifle three positions	1133	Canada; Christina Ashcroft; Sharon Bowes	1998	Commonwealth Games	Kuala Lumpur, Malaysia	

Event	Record	Athlete	Date	Meet	Place	Ref
Team
10 m air rifle	1237	Malaysia; Shahera Rahim Raja; Muslifah Zulkifli; Nur Suryani Taibi	2014		Subang, Malaysia	
50 m rifle prone	1774	Malaysia; Haslisa Hamed; Shahera Rahim Raja; Muslifah Zulkifli	2012		Subang, Malaysia	
10 m air pistol	1133	Malaysia; Bibiana Ng Pei Chin; Yan Seow Ping; Nurzaini Ismail	2007		Subang, Malaysia	
25 m pistol	1718	Malaysia; Suefarinawathy Effendi; Bibiana Ng Pei Chin; Haslinda Nosan	2002		Subang, Malaysia	
50 m rifle three positions	1747	Malaysia; Nur Suryani Taibi; Muslifah Zulkifli; Shahera Rahim Raja	2011		Subang, Malaysia	

== See also ==
- List of Sukma records in shooting
