= Shooting at the 1987 Pan American Games =

Shooting events formed part of the 1987 Pan American Games in Indianapolis.

Event	Gold	Silver	Bronze
Men's 10 metre air pistol	Donald Nygord; United States	Carlos Hora; Peru	Gregory Appleton; United States
Women's 10 metre air pistol	Tania Estrella Pérez; Cuba	Edith Vega; Cuba	Maria Nelly Amaral; Brazil
Men's 25 metre center fire pistol	Renzo Velazquez; Venezuela	Darius Young; United States	Felipe Beuvrín; Venezuela
Men's 25 metre rapid fire pistol	Bernardo Tovar; Colombia	Rojelio Arredondo; United States	John McNally; United States
Men's 25 metre standard pistol	Erich Buljung; United States	Guillermo Reyes; Cuba	Oscar Yuston; Argentina
Women's 25 metre pistol	Ruby Fox; United States	Edith Vega; Cuba	Bettie Blocksome; United States
Men's 50 metre pistol	George Ross; United States	Erich Buljung; United States	Bernardo Tovar; Colombia
Men's 50 metre running target	Michael English; United States	Todd Bensley; United States	Mark Bedlington; Canada
Men's 10 metre air rifle	Guy Lorion; Canada	Glenn Dubis; United States	Robert Foth; United States
Women's 10 metre air rifle	Sharon Bowes; Canada	Launi Meili; United States	Deena Wigger; United States
Men's 50 metre rifle prone	Canada; Canada	Canada; Canada	Argentina; Argentina
Women's 50 metre rifle prone	Deena Wigger; United States	Mary Godlove; United States	Joeller Fefer; Canada
Men's 50 metre rifle three positions	Glenn Dubis; United States	Mart Klepp; Canada	Robert Foth; United States
Women's 50 metre rifle three positions	Irma Sánchez; Cuba	Launi Meili; United States	Mary Godlove; United States
Men's skeet	Matthew Dryke; United States	Alger Mullins; United States	Brian Gabriel; Canada

== Team events ==
Event	Gold	Silver	Bronze
Men's 10 metre air pistol	United States of America; United States	Peru; Peru	Uruguay; Uruguay
Men's 10 metre air rifle	Canada; Canada	United States of America; United States	Cuba; Cuba
Men's 25 metre rapid fire pistol	Colombia; Colombia	United States of America; United States	Cuba; Cuba
Men's 25 metre center fire pistol	United States of America; United States	Venezuela; Venezuela	Brazil; Brazil
Men's 25 metre standard pistol	Venezuela; Venezuela	Cuba; Cuba	Puerto Rico; Puerto Rico
Men's 50 metre rifle prone	Canada; Canada	Argentina; Argentina	United States of America; United States
Men's 50 metre rifle three positions	United States of America; United States	Canada; Canada	Cuba; Cuba
Men's Skeet	United States; Matthew Dryke; All Mullins; Dan Carlisle	Cuba; Cuba	Canada; Canada
Men's Free Pistol	United States	Peru; Peru	Argentina; Argentina
Men's Open individual Trap	United States	Cuba; United States	Canada; Canada
Men's Open Team Trap	United States	Canada; Canada	Brazil; Brazil

== Medal table ==
Place	Nation	Gold medal	Silver medal	Bronze medal	Total
1	United States	15	12	8	35
2	Canada	5	4	5	14
3	Cuba	2	5	3	10
4	Venezuela	2	1	1	4
5	Colombia	2	0	1	3
6	Peru	0	3	0	3
7	Argentina	0	1	3	4
7	Brazil	0	0	3	3
8	Puerto Rico	0	0	1	1
8	Uruguay	0	0	1	1
Total		26	26	26	78
