= Shooting at the 1991 Pan American Games =

Shooting at the 1991 Pan American Games lists the results of all firearm-shooting events held at the 1991 Pan American Games in Havana, Cuba. Various event formats were included: those involving handguns, rifles, and shotguns (trap). Events for both men and women were held.

== Men's events ==
Event	Gold	Silver	Bronze
10 metre air pistol	Bernardo Tovar; Colombia	Ben Amonette; United States	Wilson Scheidemantel; Brazil
10 metre air rifle	David Johnson; United States	Robert Foth; United States	Guy Lorion; Canada
10 metre running target	Francis Allen; United States	Julio Sandoval; Guatemala	Scott Swinney; United States
25 metre center fire pistol	Don Nygord; United States	Darius Young; United States	Oscar Yuston; Argentina
25 metre rapid fire pistol	John McNally; United States	Rafael Rodríguez; Cuba	Guillermo Reyes; Cuba
25 metre standard pistol	Eduardo Suárez; United States	Guillermo Reyes; Cuba	Don Nygord; United States
50 metre pistol	Vicente de la Cruz; Cuba	Ben Amonette; United States	Rodney Colwell; Canada
50 metre rifle standing	Robert Foth; United States	Thomas Tamas; United States	Hermes Rodríguez; Cuba
50 metre rifle kneeling	Michael Anti; United States	Mart Klepp; Canada	Thomas Tamas; United States
50 metre running target	Jorge Ríos; Cuba	José Hernández; Cuba	Troy Lawton; United States
50 metre running target mixed runs	Jorge Ríos; Cuba	Scott Swinney; United States	José Hernández; Cuba
50 metre rifle prone	Thomas Tamas; United States	Robert Foth; United States	Hugo Romero; Ecuador
50 metre rifle three positions	Michael Anti; United States	Robert Foth; United States	Mart Klepp; Canada
Trap	Jay Waldron; United States	George Leary; Canada	Richard Chordash; United States
Skeet	Guillermo Alfredo Torres; Cuba	Dean Clark; United States	William Roy; United States

== Women's events ==
Event	Gold	Silver	Bronze
10 metre air pistol	Sharon Cozzarin; Canada	Elizabeth Callahan; United States	Tania Giansanti; Brazil
10 metre air rifle	Debra Sinclair; United States	Launi Meili; United States	Sharon Bowes; Canada
25 metre pistol	Margarita Tarradell; Cuba	Connie Petracek; United States	Roxane Thompson; United States
50 metre rifle prone	Tammie de Angelis; United States	Christina Ashcroft; Canada	Michele Scarborough; United States
50 metre rifle three positions	Debra Sinclair; United States	Tammie de Angelis; United States	Christina Ashcroft; Canada

== Team events ==
Event	Gold	Silver	Bronze
Men's 10 metre air pistol	Mexico	Dominican Republic	Brazil
Women's 10 metre air pistol	United States	Canada	Cuba
Men's 10 metre air rifle	Canada	United States	Cuba
Women's 10 metre air rifle	United States	Canada	Cuba
Men's 10 metre running target	United States	Cuba	Guatemala
Men's 25 metre center fire pistol	United States	Brazil	Argentina
Men's 25 metre standard pistol	United States	Argentina	Cuba
Men's 25 metre rapid fire pistol	United States	Cuba	Colombia
Women's 25 metre pistol	Cuba	United States	Colombia
Men's 50 metre pistol	Canada	Cuba	Venezuela
Men's 50 metre running target	Cuba	United States	Colombia
Men's 50 metre running target mixed runs	Cuba	United States	Guatemala
Men's 50 metre rifle prone	United States	Cuba	Argentina
Women's 50 metre rifle prone	United States	Cuba	Brazil
Men's 50 metre rifle three positions	United States	Cuba	Argentina
Women's 50 metre rifle three positions	United States	Cuba	Brazil
Men's Trap	Canada	United States	Cuba
Men's Skeet	United States	Cuba	Argentina

== Medal table ==
Place	Nation	Gold medal	Silver medal	Bronze medal	Total
1	United States	24	18	8	50
2	Cuba	8	11	8	27
3	Canada	4	5	5	14
4	Colombia	1	0	3	4
5	Mexico	1	0	0	1
6	Argentina	0	1	5	6
6	Brazil	0	1	5	6
8	Guatemala	0	1	2	3
9	Dominican Republic	0	1	0	1
10	Ecuador	0	0	1	1
11	Venezuela	0	0	1	1
Total		38	38	38	114
