= Bietz =

Bietz is a surname. Notable people with the surname include:

- Elmer A. Bietz (1934–2026), American politician
- Tye Warner Bietz (born 1984), Canadian trap shooter
