= Shooting at the 2014 Commonwealth Games – Women's 50 metre rifle prone =

Women's 50 metre rifle prone at the 2014 Commonwealth Games
- Venue: Barry Buddon Shooting Centre
- Dates: 28 July 2014
- Competitors: 31 from 17 nations

Medalists
gold medal	Sally Johnston	New Zealand
silver medal	Esmari van Reenen	South Africa
bronze medal	Jennifer McIntosh	Scotland

The Women's 50 metre rifle prone event was held on 28 July 2014 at the Barry Buddon Shooting Centre.

== Results ==
Rank	Name	Country	1	2	3	4	5	6	Total
1st place, gold medalist(s)	Sally Johnston	New Zealand	102.6	102.4	103.4	104.4	104.4	103.5	620.7 GR
2nd place, silver medalist(s)	Esmari van Reenen	South Africa	102.7	104.0	103.3	104.0	103.4	102.7	620.1
3rd place, bronze medalist(s)	Jennifer McIntosh	Scotland	102.9	103.6	104.6	101.2	102.9	104.3	619.5
4	Robyn Ridley	Australia	105.4	101.4	102.0	101.9	102.5	102.5	615.7
5	Lina Jones	England	102.6	100.8	102.9	101.8	104.5	102.8	615.4
6	Meena Kumari	India	103.9	104.1	101.6	100.9	101.6	103.2	615.3
7	Sarah Henderson	Scotland	101.4	104.1	101.7	101.1	104.2	102.7	615.2
8	Sian Corish	Wales	103.8	102.7	104.3	99.3	102.5	101.8	614.4
9	Muslifah Zulkifli	Malaysia	102.1	101.3	102.8	102.2	102.2	102.8	613.4
10	Jennifer Hens	Australia	102.7	103.1	102.6	102.3	103.7	98.9	613.3
11	Lajja Gauswami	India	101.6	103.1	103.2	100.6	101.0	102.8	612.3
12	Jenny Corish	Wales	101.0	101.9	99.5	104.3	104.0	101.6	612.3
13	Nur Ayuni Farhana Abdul Halim	Malaysia	99.6	102.7	101.8	103.6	103.3	101.3	612.3
14	Jenna Mackenzie	New Zealand	102.8	101.9	100.1	99.9	105.2	102.3	612.2
15	Jasmine Ser	Singapore	102.2	100.7	101.9	101.7	101.6	103.9	612.0
16	Sharon Lee	England	101.1	100.9	102.1	101.9	102.5	101.3	609.8
17	Rachel Glover	Isle of Man	101.7	103.6	99.0	101.0	102.5	100.7	608.5
18	Claudia Mcclung	Northern Ireland	101.9	102.2	100.0	101.4	98.8	102.2	606.5
19	Lara Anne Ward	Isle of Man	101.0	102.0	98.1	102.9	100.9	101.2	606.1
20	Louise Kathryn Aiken	Northern Ireland	102.1	99.1	101.5	103.2	100.0	97.6	603.5
21	Natalie Piri	Gibraltar	99.4	101.9	100.3	98.6	98.9	100.4	599.5
22	Tehani Egodawela	Sri Lanka	100.5	99.1	98.8	102.2	100.7	98.0	599.3
23	Chelsea Rose Benjamin	Saint Helena	100.5	99.8	98.1	101.9	97.6	100.8	598.7
24	Preeyam Kaur Sehmi	Kenya	99.0	101.0	100.6	100.2	99.8	96.5	597.1
25	Madolyn Andrews	Saint Helena	100.7	101.5	97.5	99.6	94.8	99.1	593.2
26	Joyce Jepchirchir Chebii	Kenya	99.9	100.7	97.2	97.3	99.5	98.3	592.9
27	Madushani Gamage	Sri Lanka	96.6	88.7	100.1	100.6	105.5	100.0	591.5
28	Cleopatra Mungoma	Uganda	94.2	94.5	97.7	98.3	95.0	94.7	574.4
29	Zahara Chelimo	Uganda	88.2	90.5	82.5	90.4	97.0	87.9	536.5
-	Evelyn Ebbey-Esugo	Nigeria	-	-	-	-	-	-	DNS
-	Caroline Utho	Nigeria	-	-	-	-	-	-	DNS
