= Irshad Ali =

Irshad Ali may refer to:

- Irshad Ali (sport shooter)
- Irshad Ali (actor)
