= Littlechild =

Littlechild may refer to:

- John Littlechild (1848–1923), first commander of the London Metropolitan Police Special Irish Branch
- Patricia Littlechild (born 1965), Scottish sport shooter and neurosurgeon
- Willie Littlechild (born 1944), Cree lawyer and member of parliament
