= Karen Morton =

Karen Morton may refer to:

- Karen Morton (model), Playboy's Miss July 1978
- Karen Morton (sport shooter), British sport shooter
