= Ken Parr (sport shooter) =

British sport shooter

Personal information
- Nationality: English
- Born: 1962 (age 63–64) Croydon

Sport
- Sport: Sport shooting
- Club: Ham and Petersham
Medal record
Sports shooting
Representing England
Commonwealth Games
Bronze medal – third place	1998 Kuala Lumpur	50m rifle 3 pos
Bronze medal – third place	1998 Kuala Lumpur	50m rifle 3 pos pair

Kenneth AJ Parr Sr. (born 1962) is a male retired British sport shooter.

== Sport shooting career ==
He represented England and won two bronze medals in the 50 metres rifle 3 position and pair, at the 1998 Commonwealth Games in Kuala Lumpur, Malaysia.

== Personal life ==
He is the father of the four times Commonwealth Games medallist Kenneth Parr.
