= Pushpamali Ramanayake =

Sri Lankan sports shooter

Personal information
- Full name: Pushpamali Ramanayake
- Nickname: Irene
- Nationality: Sri Lanka
- Born: 25 December 1967 (age 58) Colombo, Sri Lanka
- Height: 1.56 m (5 ft 1 1/2 in)
- Weight: 55 kg (121 lb)

Sport
- Sport: Shooting
- Events: 10 m air rifle (AR40); 50 m rifle 3 positions (STR3X20)
- Club: Sri Lanka Army
- Coached by: Pasan Kularathe
Medal record
Women's sport shooting
Representing Sri Lanka
Commonwealth Games
Gold medal – first place	1994 Victoria	10m Air Rifle – Pairs

Pushpamali Ramanayake (born 25 December 1967 in Colombo) is a Sri Lankan sport shooter. She has competed for Sri Lanka in rifle shooting at three Olympics (1992, 1996, 2004), and has won a gold medal with fellow shooter Malini Wickramasinghe in the air rifle pairs at the 1994 Commonwealth Games in Victoria, British Columbia, Canada.

== Career ==
Ramanayake began shooting in 1989 as a member of the Sri Lankan Army under the tutelage and early stewardship of former Olympian and commanding officer Daya Rajasingha. Three years later, she made her Olympic debut as the first ever female shooter to represent Sri Lanka at the 1992 Summer Olympics in Barcelona, finishing a distant thirty-seventh in the 10 m air rifle with a score of 382 points.

In 1994, Ramanayake reached the peak of her shooting career by landing successfully to fifth place in her pet event at the Asian Games in Hiroshima, Japan with 488.7 points. Ramanayake's rise continued on that same season, when she and her fellow markswoman Malini Wickramasinghe won Sri Lanka's first ever gold medal in the air rifle pairs at the Commonwealth Games in Victoria, British Columbia.

On her second Olympic appearance in Atlanta 1996, Ramanayake flaunted her most potential form to shoot a modest 389 for a twenty-fifth place tie with three others in her signature event, the 10 m air rifle. Ramanayake also competed in the 50 m rifle 3 positions, but finished a lowly thirty-sixth in a 38-shooter field at 564, trailing her teammate Wickramisinghe by just a single point.

Despite missing her 2000 Olympic bid, Ramanayake had capped off a historic eight-year comeback for her third Games in Athens 2004, after the National Olympic Committee of Sri Lanka decided to nominate her through an Olympic invitation as the most experienced shooter. She managed to get a minimum qualifying score of 392 in air rifle shooting from her outside-final finish at the Asian Championships in Kuala Lumpur, Malaysia few months earlier. In the 10 m air rifle, held on the first day of the competition, Ramanayake started off with a modest 97 in the first series, but fared poorly on the second and fourth to get a decent 386 out of a possible 400, finishing thirty-eight out of forty-four shooters in the qualifying round. Nearly a week later, in the 50 m rifle 3 positions, Ramanayake marked a steady 195 in prone, a lowly 181 in standing, and 191 in the kneeling series to close her historic Olympic run out of the final in a tie for twenty-fifth place, her career best after eight years, with Australia's Susan McCready at 567 points.

== Olympic results ==
Event	1992	1996	2004
50 metre rifle three positions	—N/a	36th 564	25th 567
10 metre air rifle	37th 382	25th 389	38th 386
