= Adrian Breton =

British sports shooter (1962–2007)

Personal information
- Full name: Adrian Stephen Breton
- Born: 4 October 1962 Guernsey, Channel Islands
- Died: 11 June 2007 (aged 44)
- Height: 170 cm (5 ft 7 in)
- Weight: 73 kg (161 lb)

Sport
- Country: Great Britain; Guernsey
- Sport: Sports shooting
- Event: Rapid-fire pistol
Medal record
Representing Guernsey
Commonwealth Games
Gold medal – first place	1990 Auckland	rapid fire pistol
Silver medal – second place	1986 Edinburgh	rapid fire pistol
Bronze medal – third place	1994 Victoria	25m rapid fire pistol (Pairs)
Island Games
Gold medal – first place	1987 Guernsey	rapid fire pistol
Gold medal – first place	1987 Guernsey	rapid fire pistol (pairs)

Adrian Stephen Breton (4 October 1962 – 11 June 2007) was a British sports shooter from Guernsey. He competed at the 1988 and 1992 Summer Olympics. He also competed in the Commonwealth Games, winning a gold, silver and bronze medal. As of 2022, he remains the only athlete from Guernsey to win a gold medal at the Commonwealth Games.
