= Mart Klepp =

Canadian sports shooter (born 1963)

Personal information
- Full name: Martin Klepp
- Born: 19 April 1963 (age 63) Guelph, Ontario, Canada
- Height: 1.82 m (6 ft 0 in)

Sport
- Sport: Sports shooting

Martin "Mart" Klepp (born 19 April 1963) is a Canadian sports shooter.

He finished 14th in the air rifle event and 36th in the small-bore rifle three positions event at the 1988 Summer Olympics. He won a gold and a silver medal at the 1987 Pan American Games, followed by a gold, a silver and a bronze medal at the 1991 Pan American Games. He won three gold medals and one bronze medal at the 1990 Commonwealth Games.
