= Sally Johnston =

New Zealand sport shooter

Medal record

Representing New Zealand

Women's shooting

Commonwealth Games
Gold medal – first place	2014 Glasgow	50 m rifle prone
Bronze medal – third place	1998 Kuala Lumpur	50 m rifle prone

Oceania Championships
Gold medal – first place	2007 Sydney	50 m rifle prone
Silver medal – second place	2015 Sydney	50 m rifle prone
Silver medal – second place	2013 Sydney	50 m rifle prone
Silver medal – second place	2011 Sydney	50 m rifle prone
Bronze medal – third place	2015 Sydney	50 m rifle three positions
Bronze medal – third place	2013 Sydney	50 m rifle three positions
Bronze medal – third place	2005 Brisbane	50 m rifle three positions
Bronze medal – third place	2001 Auckland	50 m rifle three positions

Sally Johnston (born Invercargill, New Zealand) is a New Zealand competitive sport shooter. She started shooting in 1983 with her first international competition in 1995 at the Oceania Championships in Auckland. Johnston placed eighth in the 50m rifle three positions and ninth in the 10m air rifle. In 1997, she beat her personal bests in all three events at the Oceania Championships in Adelaide where she placed fourth in the 50m rifle prone, tenth in the 10m air rifle and eleventh in 50m rifle three positions event.

At the 1998 Commonwealth Games in Kuala Lumpur, Johnston won the bronze medal in the women's 50m prone event. At the 2006 Commonwealth Games in Melbourne she finished fifth and at the 2010 Commonwealth Games she finished seventh.

She won the gold medal in the same event at the 2014 Commonwealth Games in Glasgow, winning by 0.6 of a point. She shot a games record of 620.7 to narrowly beat South Africa's Esmari van Reenen.

Since 2007, Johnston has trained and competed whilst working full-time at the Ministry for Primary Industries in Wellington. She has worked in the role of Manager for Food and Beverage since 2014.
