= Trevor Langridge =

British sport shooter

Personal information
- Nationality: English
Medal record
Sports shooting
Representing England
Commonwealth Games
Bronze medal – third place	1994 Victoria	Rifle 3 pos pair

Trevor Langridge is a male British sport shooter.

== Sport shooting career ==
He represented England and won a bronze medal in the 50 metres rifle three positions pairs with Chris Hector, at the 1994 Commonwealth Games in Victoria, British Columbia, Canada.
