= David Rattray =

British sports shooter (born 1937)

Personal information
- Full name: David Rattray
- Born: 9 January 1970 (age 56) Motherwell, Scotland
- Occupation: Police officer
- Height: 177 cm (5 ft 10 in)
- Weight: 85 kg (187 lb)

Sport
- Sport: Shooting sport
- Event: 10 m air rifle
- Club: Glenrothes Rifle Club
- Coached by: Alister Allan
Medal record
Sports shooting
Representing Scotland
Commonwealth Games
Bronze medal – third place	1994 Victoria	10m air rifle pairs
Bronze medal – third place	1998 Kuala Lumpur	10m air rifle pairs

David Rattray is a Scottish retired sport shooter. Rattray represented Scotland at two Commonwealth Games in the 10m air rifle event, winning two bronze medals. He represented Great Britain at the 2002 ISSF World Championships, placing 70th.

== Shooting career ==
Rattray was selected to represent Scotland at the 1994 Commonwealth Games, where he won a bronze medal in the 10m air rifle pairs with teammate Robin Law.

In 1994 he won the British 10m Air Rifle Championship, and won the bronze in 1995.

He was selected to represent 1998 Commonwealth Games, where he won another bronze medal in the same event, again partnered with Law.

In 1999 he set a new Team Record in the British Club Championship of 1764 at the British Airgun Championships with teammates Robin Law and Shirley McIntosh.
