= Alan Earle =

New Zealand sport shooter

Personal information
- Born: 1 September 1959 (age 66)

Sport
- Country: New Zealand
- Sport: Shooting
- Event: Pistol
- Coached by: Greg Yelavich
Medal record
Men's shooting
Representing New Zealand
Commonwealth Games
Silver medal – second place	1998 Kuala Lumpur	25m rapid fire pistol pairs
Silver medal – second place	2010 Delhi	25m rapid fire pistol pairs

Alan Earle (born 1 September 1959) is a competitive pistol shooter from New Zealand.

At the 1998 Commonwealth Games in Kuala Lumpur he won a silver medal in the men's 25 metre rapid fire pistol pairs event, partnering Jason Wakeling.

At the 2010 Commonwealth Games in Delhi he won a silver medal in the men's 25 metre rapid fire pistol pairs event, partnering Greg Yelavich.

He also competed at the 2002 Commonwealth Games in Manchester and the 2006 Commonwealth Games in Melbourne.
