= George Leary (sport shooter) =

Canadian sports shooter

Personal information
- Born: 19 November 1957 (age 68) Newmarket, Ontario, Canada

Sport
- Sport: Sports shooting
Medal record
Representing Canada
Commonwealth Games
Silver medal – second place	1978 Edmonton	Trap
Silver medal – second place	1994 Victoria	Trap
Silver medal – second place	1994 Victoria	Trap pairs
Pan American Games
Gold medal – first place	1991 Havana	Trap team
Silver medal – second place	1991 Havana	Trap
Silver medal – second place	1995 Mar del Plata	Trap
Silver medal – second place	1995 Mar del Plata	Trap team
Bronze medal – third place	1979 San Juan	Trap
Bronze medal – third place	1979 San Juan	Trap team
Bronze medal – third place	1999 Winnipeg	Trap

George Howard Leary (born 19 November 1957) is a Canadian sports shooter. He competed at the 1988 Summer Olympics, 1992, 1996 and the 2000 Summer Olympics.
