= Thomas Allen (sport shooter) =

Irish sports shooter (born 1953)

Personal information
- Full name: Samuel Thomas Allen
- Nationality: Irish
- Born: 20 November 1953 (age 72) Omagh, Northern Ireland

Sport
- Sport: Sports shooting
Medal record
Men's trap shooting
Representing Northern Ireland
Commonwealth Games
Gold medal – first place	1994 Victoria	Trap pairs

Samuel Thomas Allen (born 20 November 1953) is an Irish former sports shooter. During his sports career before shooting, he competed in table tennis, cross country running, badminton, and squash. Allen started sports shooting in 1978 after his neighbour's husband had invited him to take part in a local competition; he would win the competition.

Later on, he would compete at the World Championships and European Championships, also winning a gold medal at the 1994 Commonwealth Games representing Northern Ireland. At an edition of the European Championships, he would earn a quota sport to qualify for the 1996 Summer Olympics to represent Ireland. He would compete in the men's trap and men's double trap but did not advance to the finals of either event.

== Early life and early career ==
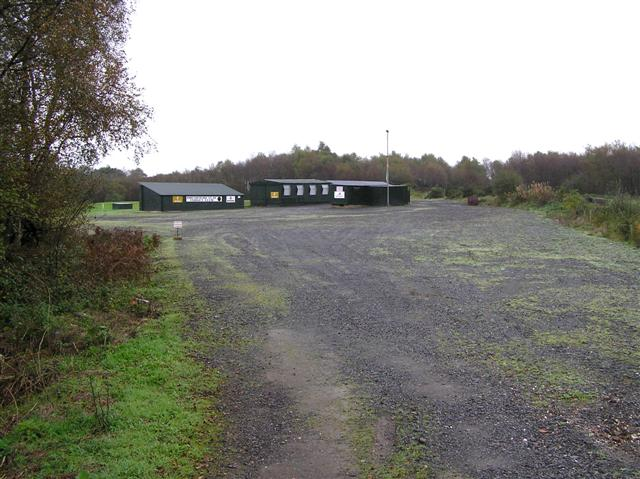
The Drumcraw Clay Target Club, the first location where Allen first competed in shooting.

Samuel Thomas Allen was born on 20 November 1953 in Omagh, Northern Ireland. Growing up, he practiced multiple competitive sports such as table tennis in the school level, cross country running the junior level, badminton in the senior level, and over 35s squash at an international level.

Allen started sports shooting in August 1978 after his neighbour's husband had invited him to take part in a local competition despite not having competed before. They would go to the Drumcraw Clay Target Club in Cookstown and Allen would win the event, with a spectator calling him a "natural" at the sport.

== Career ==
During his international career, he would compete in the World Championships and European Championships and placed high though not medaling. He would also compete at the 1994 Commonwealth Games in Victoria, Canada, representing Northern Ireland. Alongside his teammate, they would win the gold medal in the men's trap shooting pairs event with a total amount of 122 targets shot out of a possible 125.

At an edition of the European Championships, he would earn a quota spot to compete as part of the Irish team at the 1996 Summer Olympics that was set to be held in Atlanta, United States. At the 1996 Summer Games, he would first compete in the qualifying round for the men's trap from 20 to 21 July. He would shoot a total of 116 targets out of a possible 125 targets, placing equal 42nd and would not advance to the finals of the event. He then competed in the qualifying round of the men's double trap on 24 July shooting a total of 126 targets out of a possible 150. He would place equal 25th and did not advance to the finals of the event.
