= Saroja Jhuthu =

Indian sport shooter (born 1968)

Saroja Kumari Jhuthu (born June 5, 1968) is an Indian sport shooter. She won the gold medal in the Women's 25m Pistol (Pairs) with Sushma Rana at the 2006 Commonwealth Games.
