= Becky Spicer =

British sport shooter (born 1980)

Personal information
- Nationality: English
- Born: 16 March 1980 (age 46) Leicester, Leicestershire, England

Sport
- Sport: Sport shooting
- Club: Holwell Rifle Club; Leicester & District Rifle and Pistol Club
Medal record
Sports shooting
Representing England
Commonwealth Games
Bronze medal – third place	1998 Kuala Lumpur	10m air rifle
Gold medal – first place	2006 Melbourne	50m rifle 3 pos

Rebecca Jane Spicer (born 1980) is a female retired British sport shooter.

== Sport shooting career ==
She represented England and won a bronze medal in the 10 metres air rifle, at the 1998 Commonwealth Games in Kuala Lumpur, Malaysia. Four years later she made a second Games appearance at the 2002 Commonwealth Games in Manchester. A third Games appearance in 2006 resulted in winning a gold medal in the 50 metres rifle 3 position pair with Louise Minett.
