= Teresa Borrell =

New Zealand sport shooter

Medal record

Representing New Zealand

Women's Shooting

Commonwealth Games
Gold medal – first place	2002 Manchester	Double Trap (Pairs)
Bronze medal – third place	2006 Melbourne	Women's Trap (Pairs)

Teresa Borrell (born 19 May 1962 in Lyttelton, New Zealand) is a shooting competitor for New Zealand. At the 2002 Commonwealth Games she won a gold medal in the Double Trap (Pairs) event partnering Nadine Stanton.

She also competed at the 2000 Olympic Games.
