= Nadine Stanton =

New Zealand sport shooter

Medal record

Women's Shooting

Representing New Zealand

Commonwealth Games
| Gold medal – first place | 2002 Manchester | Double Trap (Pairs) |
| Silver medal – second place | 2002 Manchester | Double Trap |
| Bronze medal – third place | 2006 Melbourne | Women's Trap (Pairs) |

Nadine Marie Stanton (born 11 September 1975 in Hamilton, New Zealand) is a shooting competitor for New Zealand. At the 2002 Commonwealth Games she won a gold team medal in the Double Trap (Pairs) event partnering Teresa Borrell, and a silver team medal in the Double Trap.

She competed at the 2002 Commonwealth Games 2004 Summer Olympics, 2006 Commonwealth Games, 2008 Summer Olympics and 2010 Commonwealth Games.

Olympic results
| Event | 2004 | 2008 |
|---|---|---|
| Trap | — | 10th 63 |
| Double trap | 6th 108+29 | Not held |
