= John Grice (sport shooter) =

British sport shooter

Personal information
- Nationality: English
- Born: 18 May 1954 (age 72) Coalville, Leicestershire
Medal record
Sports shooting
Representing England
Commonwealth Games
Bronze medal – third place	1994 Victoria	trap pair

John Grice (born 1954) is a male British sport shooter. A veteran trap shooter.

== Sport shooting career ==
He represented England and won a bronze medal in the trap pairs with Bob Borsley, at the 1994 Commonwealth Games in Victoria, British Columbia, Canada.
