= Sushma Rana =

Indian sport shooter

Sushma Singh (née Rana) is an Indian shooter who won a gold medal at the 2006 Commonwealth Games, earning 1140 points, with her partner Saroja Kumari Jhuthu. She competes in the 25-meter shooting events and has held the national record for 25-metre shooting event from 2002 to 2003. She was inspired by Jaspal Rana, her older brother and a shooting champion himself, to take up the sport.

She is the daughter-in-law of the Union Defence Minister Rajnath Singh.

== Biography ==
Sushma was born the daughter of Narayan Singh Rana, an old-time BJP member. She has two brothers, including the shooting champion, Jaspal Rana, who was honoured with the Arjuna Award and the Padma Shri.
