= Martin Millar (sport shooter) =

Northern Irish sports shooter

Personal information
- Nationality: British (Northern Irish)
- Born: 23 January 1960 Northern Ireland

Sport
- Sport: Sports shooting
- Event: Fullbore rifle
- Club: Comber Rifle Club
Medal record
Representing England
Commonwealth Games
Shooting
Bronze medal – third place	1986 Edinburgh	Fullbore rifle pairs
Bronze medal – third place	1994 Victoria	Fullbore rifle pairs
Gold medal – first place	1998 Kuala Lumpur	Fullbore rifle pairs
Gold medal – first place	2002 Manchester	Fullbore rifle pairs

Martin Lindsay Millar (born 23 January 1960) is a former sports shooter from Northern Ireland, who competed at six Commonwealth Games from 1986 to 2006, winning two gold medals.

== Biography ==
Millar represented Northern Ireland at the 1986 Commonwealth Games in the Full bore rifle Queens prize pair events, winning a bronze medal with David Calvert.

Four years later he represented the Northern Ireland team again in the full bore rifle Queens prize pair events and won another bronze medal for the team (with Calvert) at the 1994 Commonwealth Games in Canada.

He finally won gold at the 1998 Commonwealth Games and followed this up with a second gold four years later in Manchester.

Millar was a member of the Comber Rifle Club and with David Calvert, opened their new club house in 2003.
