= Cynthia Meyer (sport shooter) =

Canadian sport shooter

Personal information
- Full name: Cynthia Barbara Meyer
- Born: October 6, 1965 (age 60) New York City, New York, U.S.

Sport
- Country: Canada
- Sport: Shooting sports
- Event: Trap shooting
Medal record
Women's trap shooting
Representing Canada
ISSF World Championships
Silver medal – second place	1997 Lima	Double trap
Commonwealth Games
Gold medal – first place	2002 Manchester	Trap
Bronze medal – third place	2010 Delhi	Trap pairs
Pan American Games
Silver medal – second place	2003 Santo Domingo	Trap
Silver medal – second place	2003 Santo Domingo	Double trap

Cynthia Barbara Meyer (born October 6, 1965, in New York City, United States) is a Canadian trap shooter who won a gold medal for Canada at the 2002 Commonwealth Games in Manchester, England. Meyer is also a former world championship medalist in the double trap. Meyer was on Canada's Olympic teams in 1996, 2000 and 2004. After missing out on selection for the 2008 and 2012 Olympics, Meyer was named to Canada's team for the 2016 Olympics.
