= Julian Lawton =

New Zealand sport shooter

Personal information
- Full name: Julian Edward Lawton
- Born: 22 August 1950 (age 76) Napier, New Zealand

Sport
- Country: New Zealand
- Sport: Shooting
Medal record
Representing New Zealand
Men's shooting
Commonwealth Games
Silver medal – second place	1994 Victoria	50 m free pistol pairs
Bronze medal – third place	1990 Auckland	10 m air pistol pairs

Julian Edward Lawton (born 22 August 1950) is a New Zealand sport shooter. He won medals representing his country in pistol events at the 1990 and 1994 Commonwealth Games.

== Early life ==
Lawton was born in Napier on 22 August 1950 and educated at Napier Boys' High School and the Central Institute of Technology, becoming an electrical and electronics technician.

== Competitive shooting ==
Lawton began representing New Zealand in shooting internationally in 1986, and competed at Oceania region World Cup shooting events that year, and in 1988, 1991 and 1993.

At the 1990 Commonwealth Games, Lawton won a bronze medal in the 10 m air pistol pairs with Greg Yelavich, and also competed in the 10 m air pistol, coming 8th. Later that year, Lawton was awarded the New Zealand 1990 Commemoration Medal.

At the 1994 Commonwealth Games, Lawton won a silver medal in the men's 50 m free pistol pairs, again with Greg Yelavich. At those Games, he also competed in the 10 m air pistol, coming 19th; the 10 m air pistol pairs with Greg Yelavich, coming 7th; and the 50 m free pistol, placing 21st.

Lawton also represented New Zealand at the 1990 ISSF World Shooting Championships in Moscow, and at ISSF World Cup events in 1991, 1992 and 1993.
