= Antony Ringer =

British sport shooter (born 1966)

Personal information
- Nationality: English
- Born: 1966 (age 59–60) Norfolk
Medal record
Sports shooting
Representing England
Commonwealth Games
Silver medal – second place	1994 Victoria	fullbore rifle

Antony 'Ant' Ringer (born 1966) is a male British sport shooter.

== Sport shooting career ==
He represented England and won a silver medal in the fullbore rifle, at the 1994 Commonwealth Games in Victoria, British Columbia, Canada. Four years later he once again represented England in the fullbore rifle events, at the 1998 Commonwealth Games in Kuala Lumpur, Malaysia.
