= Margaret Thomas (sport shooter) =

British sport shooter

Personal information
- Nationality: English
- Born: 25 November 1953 (age 72)

Sport
- Events: 10 metre air pistol; 25 metre sport pistol
- Club: Marylebone Rifle & Pistol Club
Medal record
Sports shooting
Representing England
Commonwealth Games
Silver medal – second place	1994 Victoria	25m sport pistol
Bronze medal – third place	1994 Victoria	25m sport pistol pair
Bronze medal – third place	1994 Victoria	10m air pistol pair

Margaret Thomas (born 1953), is a female retired British sport shooter.

== Sport shooting career ==
Thomas represented Great Britain at the 1988 Summer Olympics in the women's 10 metre air pistol and 25 metre pistol events.

In September 1990 she set the current British Record in Women's 25m Pistol of 585 at Bisley in the BPC Championships.

She was the BPC Women's Sport Pistol Champion in 1991 and 1992.

Thomas was selected to represent England at the 1994 Commonwealth Games in Victoria, Canada. She won Silver in the 25m sport pistol. With Carol Page, she won bronze medals in the pairs events for 10m air pistol and 25m sport pistol pairs.
