= Lindsay Volpin =

British sport shooter

Personal information
- Nationality: English
- Born: April 1962 (age 64)
Medal record
Sports shooting
Representing England
Commonwealth Games
Silver medal – second place	1994 Victoria	50m 3 pos rifle pair

Lindsay Margaret Ann Volpin (born 1962) is a female British sport shooter.

== Sport shooting career ==
Volpin represented England and won a silver medal in the 50 metres three-position rifle pairs with Karen Morton, in addition to competing in the rifle prone events, at the 1994 Commonwealth Games in Victoria, British Columbia, Canada.
