= Carol Page =

British sport shooter (1948–2023)

Personal information
- Nationality: English
- Born: Carol Bartlett; 19 October 1948 Gosport, Hampshire, England
- Died: 12 October 2023 (aged 74)

Sport
- Events: 10 metre air pistol; 25 metre sport pistol
- Club: Marylebone Rifle & Pistol Club
Medal record
Sports shooting
Representing England
Commonwealth Games
Bronze medal – third place	1994 Victoria	10m air pistol pair
Bronze medal – third place	1994 Victoria	25m sport pistol pair

Carol Anne Page (née Bartlett, 19 October 1948 – 12 October 2023) was a British sport shooter. She represented Great Britain at the Olympic Games and World and European Championship level as well as representing England at the Commonwealth Games, winning two medals in 1994.

By her retirement, she had been British Women's Champion in 25m Pistol five times, and British Women's 10m Air Pistol Champion 13 times.

Page died on 12 October 2023, at the age of 74.

== Sport shooting career ==
Page represented Great Britain at the 1984 Summer Olympics in the women's 25 metre pistol and at the 1996 Summer Olympics in the women's 25 metre pistol and women's 10 metre air pistol.

Page represented England at the 1994 Commonwealth Games in Victoria, Canada. With Margaret Thomas, she won bronze medals in the pairs events for 10m air pistol and 25m sport pistol.

Four years later she represented England in the air pistol events, at the 1998 Commonwealth Games in Kuala Lumpur, Malaysia.
