= Jim Cornish =

British sport shooter (born 1954)

Personal information
- Nationality: English
- Born: 15 September 1954 (age 71)
Medal record
Sports shooting
Representing England
Commonwealth Games
Silver medal – second place	1994 Victoria	50m rifle prone

James Cornish (born 1954) is a male retired British sport shooter.

== Sport shooting career ==
He represented England and won a silver medal in the 50 metres rifle prone singles event and also competed in the pairs with Tony Lincoln, at the 1994 Commonwealth Games in Victoria, British Columbia, Canada.
