= Neil Day =

British sport shooter (born 1965)

Personal information
- Nationality: English
- Born: 1965 (age 60–61) Huntingdon, Cambridgeshire
Medal record
Sports shooting
Representing England
Commonwealth Games
Silver medal – second place	1998 Kuala Lumpur	rifle prone pair
Gold medal – first place	2002 Manchester	rifle prone pair

Neil Day (born 1965) is a male retired British sport shooter.

== Sport shooting career ==
He represented England and won a silver medal in the 50 metres rifle prone (pair) with Philip Scanlan, at the 1998 Commonwealth Games in Kuala Lumpur, Malaysia. Four years later he won a gold medal in the same event at the 2002 Commonwealth Games with Michael Babb.
