= Drew Harvey (sport shooter) =

British sports shooter (born 1978)

Drew Harvey (born 26 August 1978 in Norwich) is a British sport shooter. He competed at the 2000 Summer Olympics in the men's skeet event, in which he tied for 39th place.
