= Ben Sandstrom =

Australian sports shooter

Personal information
- Full name: Bengt Olov Sandstrom
- Nationality: Australia
- Born: 16 January 1956 (age 70) Gothenburg, Västra Götaland, Sweden
- Height: 168 cm (5 ft 6 in)
- Weight: 68 kg (150 lb)

Sport
- Sport: Shooting
- Event(s): 10m air pistol, 50m pistol, 25m standard pistol
Medal record
Men's shooting
Representing Australia
Commonwealth Games
Gold medal – first place	1994 Victoria	Free Pistol - Pairs
Gold medal – first place	1994 Victoria	Air Pistol - Pairs
Gold medal – first place	1990 Auckland	Air Pistol
Gold medal – first place	1990 Auckland	Free Pistol - Pairs
Silver medal – second place	1990 Auckland	Free Pistol
Silver medal – second place	1990 Auckland	Air Pistol - Pairs
Bronze medal – third place	1986 Edinburgh	Free Pistol - Pairs
Bronze medal – third place	1994 Victoria	Free Pistol

Bengt Olov "Ben" Sandstrom (born 16 January 1956) is an Australian sport shooter. Since 1986, Sandstrom has competed at three Olympic Games and three Commonwealth Games. He has competed in the air, free and standard pistol.
