= Brian Thomson (sport shooter) =

New Zealand sports shooter

Brian Thomson (born 1 September 1957 in Tokoroa) is a sport shooter from New Zealand. He competed at the 2000 Summer Olympics in the men's skeet event, in which he tied for 47th place.
