= Jason Wakeling =

New Zealand sport shooter (born 1968)

Medal record

Representing New Zealand

Men's shooting

Commonwealth Games
| Silver medal – second place | 1998 Kuala Lumpur | 25m rapid fire pistol pairs |

Jason Wakeling (born 24 May 1968) is a competitive pistol shooter from New Zealand. At the 1998 Commonwealth Games he won a silver medal in the men's 25 metre rapid fire pistol pairs event, partnering Alan Earle.

Highest official ISSF World ranking was 14th for 25m Olympic Rapid Fire Pistol in April 2002.

Represented New Zealand for 29 years (1988 - 2017).

Winner of 100+ NZ National shooting titles in more than 20 different shooting disciplines.
