= Gerd Barkman =

New Zealand sport shooter

Medal record

Representing New Zealand

Women's Shooting

Commonwealth Games
Silver medal – second place	1994 Victoria	10m air pistol (pairs)

Gerd Barkman is a shooting competitor for New Zealand.

== Life ==
At the 1994 Commonwealth Games she won a silver medal in the 10 metre air pistol pairs with Jocelyn Lees. She also competed in the 10m air pistol, coming 4th; the 25m sport pistol, coming 7th; and the 25m sport pistol pairs, coming 4th.
