= Tania Corrigan =

New Zealand sport shooter

Medal record

Representing New Zealand

Women's Shooting

Commonwealth Games
Silver medal – second place	1998 Kuala Lumpur	10m air pistol (pairs)
Silver medal – second place	1998 Kuala Lumpur	25m pistol (pairs)
Bronze medal – third place	1998 Kuala Lumpur	10m air pistol
Bronze medal – third place	2002 Manchester	25m pistol (pairs)

Tania Corrigan (born 1965 in Auckland, New Zealand) is a shooting competitor for New Zealand.

At the 1998 Commonwealth Games she won two silver medals partnering Jocelyn Lees; one in the 10 metre air pistol (pairs) and one in the 25 metre pistol (pairs) event. She also won a bronze medal in the 10 metre air pistol event. She secured another bronze medal at the 2002 Commonwealth Games in the 25 metre pistol (pairs) event again alongside Jocelyn Lees.
