= Patricia Littlechild =

Scottish sport shooter and neurosurgeon

Personal information
- Nationality: Scottish
- Born: 1965 (age 60–61)

Sport
- Country: Scotland
- Sport: Shooting
Medal record
Commonwealth Games
Silver medal – second place	1994 Victoria	50m Rifle Prone Pairs
Bronze medal – third place	1994 Victoria	50m Rifle Prone Individual

Patricia Littlechild (born 1965) is a Scottish sport shooter and neurosurgeon.

Littlechild competed at the 1994 Commonwealth Games where she won a silver medal in the 50m rifle prone pairs event alongside Shirley McIntosh and a bronze medal in the 50m rifle prone individual event.

She now works in Glasgow as a neurosurgeon.
