= Phillip Adams (sport shooter) =

Australian sport shooter (born 1945)

Personal information
- Full name: Phillip Maxwell Adams
- Born: 29 July 1945 (age 81) Forbes, New South Wales, Australia
- Height: 6’0
- Weight: 93 kg (205 lb)

Sport
- Sport: Shooting
- Events: 10m air pistol, 50m pistol, 25m center-fire pistol, 25m standard pistol
Medal record
Men's shooting
Representing Australia
Commonwealth Games
Gold medal – first place	1982 Brisbane	Free Pistol – Pairs
Gold medal – first place	1982 Brisbane	Air Pistol – Pairs
Gold medal – first place	1986 Edinburgh	Centre-Fire Pistol – Pairs
Gold medal – first place	1990 Auckland	Free Pistol
Gold medal – first place	1990 Auckland	Free Pistol – Pairs
Gold medal – first place	1990 Auckland	Centre-Fire Pistol – Pairs
Gold medal – first place	1994 Victoria	Free Pistol – Pairs
Silver medal – second place	1982 Brisbane	Air Pistol
Silver medal – second place	1986 Edinburgh	Free Pistol
Silver medal – second place	1986 Edinburgh	Centre-Fire Pistol
Silver medal – second place	1986 Edinburgh	Air Pistol – Pairs
Silver medal – second place	1990 Auckland	Air Pistol
Silver medal – second place	1990 Auckland	Air Pistol – Pairs
Silver medal – second place	1994 Victoria	Free Pistol
Silver medal – second place	1994 Victoria	Centre-Fire Pistol – Pairs
Silver medal – second place	2002 Manchester	Standard Pistol – Pairs
Bronze medal – third place	1982 Brisbane	Free Pistol
Bronze medal – third place	1986 Edinburgh	Free Pistol – Pairs

Phillip Maxwell Adams OAM (born 29 July 1945) is an Australian sport shooter. Adams has competed at four consecutive Olympic Games, between 1984 and 1996, and six consecutive Commonwealth Games between 1982 and 2002. He shares the record for the most medals won in Commonwealth Games with a total of eighteen medals (seven golds, nine silver, and two bronze) with English shooter Mick Gault. He has competed in the air, free, centre-fire and standard pistol, winning the Oceanian Championships in all four events. In 1992 he won the 10m air pistol event at the Benito Juarez World Cup championships in Mexico City.

In 1991, after winning his sixth gold medal at Commonwealth Games, he was awarded the Medal of the Order of Australia for his services to the sport of pistol shooting. He has also been inducted into the New South Wales Hall of Champions.

Compared to his outstanding results at the Commonwealth Games, his performances at the Olympic Games are less impressive, having failed to reach the final round in any of the seven events he has entered. His best result was equal 15th in the Men's 10 metre air pistol at Seoul in 1988.

Prior to the 2002 Commonwealth Games in Manchester, Adams returned a positive drug test to the diuretic hydrochlorothiazide, which he was taking under medical advice to treat high blood pressure. After initially being found guilty, but given no suspension as it was not considered to be performance enhancing in shooting, the decision was later overturned and he was banned for two years.

He lives in Forbes, New South Wales, where he first learned to shoot to keep vermin from his farm.
