= Irshad Ali (sport shooter) =

Pakistani sport shooter

Personal information
- Nationality: Pakistani

Sport
- Country: Pakistan
- Sport: Sports Shooting
Medal record
Men's Shooting
Representing Pakistan
Commonwealth Games
Silver medal – second place	2006 Melbourne	Men's 25 m Standard Pistol Singles
Bronze medal – third place	2002 Manchester	Men's 25 m Center-Fire Pistol Singles
Bronze medal – third place	2002 Manchester	Men's 25 m Center-Fire Pistol Pairs

Irshad Ali (born 17 December 1966) is a Pakistani sports shooter. He is Pakistan's most successful shooter having won three medals at the Commonwealth Games. He competed in the 2002 Manchester, 2006 Melbourne and 2010 New Delhi Games. He has also won multiple medals at the South Asian Games including three silver and a bronze medal at the 1999 Kathmandu Games, five silver medals at the 2004 Islamabad Games, and two gold and two bronze medals at the 2006 Colombo Games.

== Career ==
Ali is employed with Pakistan Navy.

== Sportsman ==
=== Commonwealth Games ===
Pakistan has won three Shooting medals at the Commonwealth Games. All three medals have come courtesy of Irshad Ali. Ali took part in the 2002 Commonwealth Games in Manchester, England where he won two bronze medals, both in 25m centre fire pistol (singles and pairs). His third medal came at the 2006 Commonwealth Games in Melbourne, Australia where he won a silver in 25m standard pistol singles.
