= Christos Kourtellas =

Cypriot sports shooter (born 1974)

Personal information
- Nationality: Cypriot
- Born: 9 August 1974 (age 50); Nicosia, Cyprus

Sport
- Sport: Sports shooting

Christos Kourtellas (born 9 August 1974) is a Cypriot sports shooter. He competed in the men's skeet event at the 1996 Summer Olympics.
