= Nigel Wallace =

British sport shooter

Nigel Wallace OLY
Personal information
- Nationality: English
- Born: 5 June 1967 (age 59) Rochford, Essex
Medal record
Sports shooting
Representing England
Commonwealth Games
Bronze medal – third place	1994 Victoria	10m air rifle
Silver medal – second place	1994 Victoria	10m air rifle pair
Gold medal – first place	1998 Kuala Lumpur	10m air rifle pair
Bronze medal – third place	2002 Manchester	10m air rifle pair

Nigel Ian Wallace (born 5 June 1967) is a male British sport shooter.

== Sport shooting career ==
Wallace was the first person as a junior to win the senior British air rifle championship and has held multiple English, British records and won many championships throughout his target shooting career

Wallace competed at three consecutive Commonwealth Games from 1994 until 2002, winning medals at each games.

He represented England and won a bronze medal in the 10 metres air rifle and a silver medal in the pairs with Chris Hector, at the 1994 Commonwealth Games in Victoria, British Columbia, Canada. Four years later he represented England in the same events but this time won a gold medal in the pairs with Hector, at the 1998 Commonwealth Games in Kuala Lumpur, Malaysia. Finally at the 2002 Commonwealth Games in Manchester, he won a bronze medal in the pairs, once again with Hector.

Wallace also represented Great Britain at the 1992 Olympic Games in Barcelona.

== Personal life ==
He was a BT manager by trade.
