= Bob Borsley =

British sport shooter

Personal information
- Nationality: English
- Born: 19 June 1959 (age 67) Cheadle, Staffordshire
Medal record
Sports shooting
Representing England
Commonwealth Games
Bronze medal – third place	1994 Victoria	trap
Bronze medal – third place	1994 Victoria	trap pair

Robert 'Bob' Borsley (born 1959) is a male retired British sport shooter.

== Sport shooting career ==
He represented England and won two bronze medals in the trap singles and trap pairs with John Grice, at the 1994 Commonwealth Games in Victoria, British Columbia, Canada. Four years later he represented England in the trap singles, at the 1998 Commonwealth Games in Kuala Lumpur, Malaysia.
