= Carrie Quigley =

Australian sport shooter

Personal information
- Nationality: Australia
- Born: 22 June 1970 (age 56)

Sport
- Sport: Shooting
Medal record
Women's shooting
Representing Australia
Commonwealth Games
Gold medal – first place	1998 Kuala Lumpur	50m Rifle Prone - Pair
Silver medal – second place	1998 Kuala Lumpur	50m Rifle Prone
Commonwealth Shooting Championships
Gold medal – first place	1997 Kualu Lumpur	50m Rifle 3 Positions Individual

Carolyn "Carrie" Quigley (born 22 June 1970 in Adelaide) is an Australian sport shooter. She was a gold medallist in the sport rifle prone pairs and silver medallist in the sport rifle prone events at the 1998 Commonwealth Games in Kuala Lumpur and placed 39th in the women's 50 metre rifle three positions event at the 2000 Summer Olympics.

She won gold in the women's 50metre three-position rifle at the 1997 Commonwealth Shooting Championships.
