= Des Coe =

New Zealand sports shooter

Medal record

Representing New Zealand

Men's Shooting

Commonwealth Games
| Bronze medal – third place | 1998 Kuala Lumpur | Trap |

Desmond Coe (born 22 November 1958) is a shooting competitor for New Zealand. At the 1998 Commonwealth Games he won the bronze medal in the Trap event. He has competed at one Olympic Games; the 2000 Summer Olympics in Sydney.
