= Geoffrey Jukes =

New Zealand sports shooter

Geoffrey Jukes (born 21 November 1950 in Winton) is a New Zealand sport shooter. He competed at the 2000 Summer Olympics in the men's skeet event, in which he tied for 19th place.
