= David Cunningham (sport shooter) =

Australian sport shooter (born 1962)

Personal information
- Born: 28 January 1962 (age 64)
Medal record
Shooting sport
Commonwealth Games
Bronze medal – third place	1998 Kuala Lumpur	Skeet
Silver medal – second place	2002 Manchester	Skeet pairs

David Cunningham (born 28 January 1962 in Melbourne) is an Australian sport shooter. He competed at the 1996 and 2000 Summer Olympics; in 1996, he tied for 20th place in the men's skeet event, while in 2000, he tied for 39th place in the men's skeet event.
