= Karen Morton (sport shooter) =

British sport shooter

Personal information
- Nationality: English
Medal record
Sports shooting
Representing England
Commonwealth Games
Silver medal – second place	1994 Victoria	10m air rifle pair
Silver medal – second place	1994 Victoria	50m 3 pos rifle pair

Karen Morton is a female British sport shooter.

== Sport shooting career ==
Morton represented England and won two silver medals in the 10 metres air rifle pairs with Louise Minett and the 50 metres three-position rifle pairs with Lindsay Volpin, at the 1994 Commonwealth Games in Victoria, British Columbia, Canada. Four years later she represented England in the 50 metres three-position rifle events, at the 1998 Commonwealth Games in Kuala Lumpur, Malaysia.
