= Tye Warner Bietz =

Canadian trap shooter

Tye Warner Bietz (born February 5, 1984, in Calgary, Alberta, Canada) is a Canadian trap shooter. He is best known for his silver medal win at the 2006 Commonwealth Games in Men's Trap Pairs. Bietz teamed up with fellow Canadian Kirk Reynolds to shoot 185, 4 points behind the gold medal winning Australians.
