= Lindy Imgrund =

Australian sports shooter (born 1976)

Lindy Imgrund (born 6 March 1976) is an Australian sport shooter. She tied for 41st place in the women's 10 metre air rifle event at the 2000 Summer Olympics.
