= Esmari van Reenen =

South African sport shooter

Personal information
- Nationality: South Africa
- Born: 28 September 1981 (age 44)
- Height: 1.73 m (5 ft 8 in)
- Weight: 105 kg (231 lb)

Sport
- Sport: Shooting
- Event(s): 10 m air rifle (AR40); 50 m rifle 3 positions (STR3X20)
Medal record
Women's shooting
Representing South Africa
Commonwealth Games
Silver medal – second place	2002 Manchester	Women's Smallbore Rifle Prone Individual
Silver medal – second place	2006 Melbourne	Women's 50m Rifle 3 Position (Singles)

Esmari van Reenen (born September 28, 1981) is a South African sport shooter. She won the silver medal for the rifle three positions at the 2006 Commonwealth Games in Melbourne, Australia, losing out by seven tenths of a point (0.7) to India's Anuja Jung. Van Reenen received a qualifying place for the Olympics by capturing the gold in the same category at the 2007 ISSF African Shooting Championships in Cairo, Egypt. She also achieved a best result in the international stage by finishing fifth at the 2008 ISSF World Cup in Rio de Janeiro, with a score of 673.3 points.

Van Reenen became one of the first female sport shooters to represent South Africa at the 2008 Summer Olympics in Beijing. She competed in the women's 50 m rifle 3 positions, where she was able to shoot 198 targets in a prone position, 183 in standing, and 197 in kneeling, for a total score of 578 points, finishing only in sixteenth place.
