= Malini Wickramasinghe =

Sri Lankan sport shooter

Personal information
- Nationality: Sri Lankan
- Born: 22 July 1964 (age 61)
- Occupation: Sport shooter
Medal record
Women's sport shooting
Representing Sri Lanka
Commonwealth Games
| Gold medal – first place | 1994 Victoria | 10m Air Rifle – Pairs |
| Silver medal – second place | 1994 Victoria | 10m Air Rifle |

Malini Wickramasinghe (born 22 July 1964) is a Sri Lankan sport shooter. She competed in rifle shooting events at the Summer Olympics in 1996 and 2000.

== Olympic results ==
| Event | 1996 | 2000 |
|---|---|---|
| 50 metre rifle three positions (women) | 35th | 42nd |
| 10 metre air rifle (women) | T-44th | 47th |
