= Mark Bedlington =

Canadian sports shooter (born 1963)

Personal information
- Born: 24 April 1963 (age 62); Peterborough, Ontario, Canada

Sport
- Sport: Sports shooting

Mark Bedlington (born 24 April 1963) is a Canadian sports shooter. He competed in the men's 50 metre running target event at the 1984 Summer Olympics.
