= Guy Lorion =

Canadian sports shooter (born 1953)

Personal information
- Born: 23 March 1953 (age 72); Montreal, Quebec, Canada

Sport
- Sport: Sports shooting

Guy Lorion (born 23 March 1953) is a Canadian sports shooter. He competed at the 1984 Summer Olympics, the 1988 Summer Olympics and the 1992 Summer Olympics.
