= John Rochon =

Canadian sport shooter

John Rochon is a Canadian shooter.

He won 3 bronze and 2 silver for Canada in the 1998 Commonwealth Games. He is the oldest person to represent Canada in the Commonwealth Games, when he was aged 57.

He was awarded the Order of Ontario in 2004.
