= Sharon Bowes =

Canadian sport shooter (born 1966)

Personal information
- Full name: Sharon Ruth Bowes
- Born: September 17, 1966 (age 59) Windsor, Ontario, Canada

Sport
- Country: Canada
- Sport: Sports shooting
- Events: 10 m air rifle, 50 m rifle 3 pos.
Medal record
Pan American Games
Gold medal – first place	1987 Indianapolis	10 m air rifle, ind.
Bronze medal – third place	1991 Havana	10 m air rifle, ind.
Silver medal – second place	1999 Winnipeg	10 m air rifle, ind.
Silver medal – second place	1995 Mar del Plata	50 m rifle 3 pos., ind.
Commonwealth Games
Silver medal – second place	1986 Edinburgh	10 m air rifle, ind.
Gold medal – first place	1986 Edinburgh	10 m air rifle, pairs
Bronze medal – third place	1994 Victoria	10 m air rifle, ind.
Bronze medal – third place	1994 Victoria	10 m air rifle, pairs
Gold medal – first place	1994 Victoria	50 m rifle 3 pos., ind.
Gold medal – first place	1994 Victoria	50 m rifle 3 pos., pairs
Silver medal – second place	1998 Kuala Lumpur	10 m air rifle, ind.
Gold medal – first place	1998 Kuala Lumpur	50 m rifle 3 pos., pairs
Silver medal – second place	1998 Kuala Lumpur	50 m rifle 3 pos., ind.
Gold medal – first place	1998 Kuala Lumpur	10 m air rifle, pairs
Silver medal – second place	2002 Manchester	10 m air rifle, pairs
Bronze medal – third place	2002 Manchester	50 m rifle 3 pos., pairs

Sharon Ruth Bowes (born September 17, 1966, in Windsor, Ontario) is a Canadian sport shooter. She competed in rifle shooting events at the Summer Olympics in 1984, 1988, 1992, and 2000.

== Olympic results ==
Event	1984	1988	1992	2000
50 metre rifle three positions (women)	19th	5th	7th	T-26th
10 metre air rifle (women)	4th	7th	T-26th	T-32nd
