= Patrick Murray (sport shooter) =

Australian sports shooter (1945–2021)

Personal information
- Nationality: Australian
- Born: 11 March 1945 London, England
- Died: 3 July 2021 (aged 76)

Sport
- Sport: Sports shooting
Medal record
Men's shooting
Representing Australia
Commonwealth Games
Gold medal – first place	1986 Edinburgh	Men's rapid-fire pistol
Silver medal – second place	1986 Edinburgh	Men's rapid-fire pistol - Pairs
Gold medal – first place	1990 Auckland	Men's rapid-fire pistol - Pairs
Silver medal – second place	1990 Auckland	Men's rapid-fire pistol
Gold medal – first place	1994 Victoria BC	Men's rapid-fire pistol - Pairs
Bronze medal – third place	1994 Victoria BC	Men's rapid-fire pistol
Gold medal – first place	1998 Kuala Lumpur	Men's rapid-fire pistol - Pairs

Patrick Brian Murray (11 March 1945 – 3 July 2021) was an Australian sports shooter. He competed at the 1992 Summer Olympics and the 1996 Summer Olympics.
