= Sharon Cozzarin =

Canadian sports shooter (born 1956)

Personal information
- Born: 5 October 1956 (age 68); Fergus, Ontario, Canada

Sport
- Sport: Sports shooting

Sharon Cozzarin (born 5 October 1956) is a Canadian former sports shooter. She competed in the women's 10 metre air pistol event at the 1992 Summer Olympics.
