= Bibiana Ng =

Malaysian sport shooter

Pei Chin Bibiana (Chinese: 黄佩琴; born 16 June 1977 in Langkawi, Malaysia) is a Malaysian sport shooter. Pei has been a practicing shooter since 1994 and began competing in the same year. She competed at the 2010 Commonwealth Games in Delhi, Winning a gold medal in the 10m air pistol individual event.
