= Christina Ashcroft =

Canadian sport shooter (born 1964)

Personal information
- Full name: Christina Else Schulze-Ashcroft
- Nationality: Canadian
- Born: June 28, 1964 (age 62)

Sport
- Country: Canada
- Sport: Shooting
Medal record
Commonwealth Games
Gold medal – first place	1994 Victoria	50m rifle, three positions - pairs
Gold medal – first place	1998 Kuala Lumpur	10m Air Rifle - Pairs
Gold medal – first place	1998 Kuala Lumpur	50m Rifle 3 Position - Pairs
Silver medal – second place	1998 Kuala Lumpur	50m Rifle Prone - Pairs
Bronze medal – third place	1994 Victoria	10m Air Rifle - Pairs
Bronze medal – third place	1994 Victoria	50m Rifle 3 Position - Individual
Bronze medal – third place	1994 Victoria	50m Rifle Prone - Pairs
Pan American Games
Silver medal – second place	1991 Havana	50 metre rifle, prone
Bronze medal – third place	1999 Winnipeg	50 metre rifle, three positions

Christina Ashcroft (born 28 June 1964) is a Canadian sport shooter.

Ashcroft participated in the Summer Olympics in 1984, 1988 and 1992.

She participated at the 1994 Commonwealth Games winning a gold medal in the 50m rifle, three positions pairs event and bronze medals in the 10m Air Rifle pairs, 50m Rifle 3 Position individual and 50m Rifle Prone pairs events. Ashcroft also won two gold medals in the 10m Air Rifle pairs and 50m Rifle 3 Position pairs events and a silver medal in the 50m Rifle Prone pairs event at the 1998 Commonwealth Games.

She won a silver medal at the 1991 Pan American Games in the Small Bore 50 metre rifle prone event and a bronze at the 1999 Pan American Games in the 50 metre rifle, three positions event.
