= Annette Woodward =

Australian sport shooter (born 1947)

Personal information
- Full name: Annette Mary Woodward
- Nationality: Australia
- Born: 8 November 1947 (age 79) Melbourne, Australia
- Height: 1.66 m (5 ft 5 1/2 in)
- Weight: 66 kg (146 lb)

Sport
- Sport: Shooting
- Events: 10 m air pistol (AP40); 25 m pistol (SP)
- Club: Melbourne Airport Pistol Club
- Coached by: Anatoliy Babushkin
Medal record
Women's shooting
Representing Australia
Commonwealth Games
Gold medal – first place	1994 Victoria	25m Sport Pistol (Pair)
Gold medal – first place	1994 Victoria	10m Air Pistol (Pair)
Silver medal – second place	1994 Victoria	10m Air Pistol
Bronze medal – third place	1994 Victoria	25m Sport Pistol
Gold medal – first place	1998 Kuala Lumpur	25m Sport Pistol (Pair)

Annette Mary Woodward (born 8 November 1947 in Melbourne, Australia) is an Australian sport shooter. She has competed for Australia in pistol shooting at two Olympics (1996, and 2004), and has collected a total of six medals in a major international competition, spanning the World Cup series, Oceanian Championships, and two editions of the Commonwealth Games (1994 and 1998). During her sporting career, Woodward trained under head coach Anatoliy Babushkin for the Australian national team, while shooting at the luxuriously appointed Melbourne Airport Pistol Club.

Woodward started shooting seriously in 1985 and eventually won a total of four medals, two golds, one silver, and one bronze, in both air and sport pistol at the Commonwealth Games nine years later. She made her first Australian team at the 1996 Summer Olympics in Atlanta, finishing twenty-third in the sport pistol with a total score of 573 points (284 in precision and 289 in the rapid-fire).

In 1998, Woodward shared her third career gold with partner Christine Trefry in her signature event at her second Commonwealth Games in Kuala Lumpur, Malaysia, but retired immediately to take care of her ailing husband Ray, who had been diagnosed with cancer and consequently died a year later. Following her husband's premature death, Woodward could not bring herself to shoot until she decided on a comeback in 2002 after missing Sydney 2000 and her possible third Commonwealth Games.

Woodward had been set to become Australia's oldest athlete (aged 56) in 28 years after securing a selection on her second Olympic team to compete in the 25 m pistol at the 2004 Summer Olympics in Athens. She managed to get a minimum qualifying score of 586 in sport pistol shooting to obtain an Olympic quota place for Australia, following her top finish at the Oceanian Championships in Auckland, New Zealand less than a year earlier. Woodward shot 284 in the precision stage and a scintillating 292 in the rapid fire for a total score of 576 points in the qualifying round, finishing in eighteenth place out of thirty-seven elite shooters.
