= Stephen Petterson =

New Zealand sport shooter

Stephen Petterson MNZM
Personal information
- Full name: Stephen Kelly Petterson
- Born: 2 August 1957 (age 68) Auckland, New Zealand

Sport
- Country: New Zealand
- Sport: Shooting
Medal record
Representing New Zealand
Men's shooting
Commonwealth Games
Gold medal – first place	1990 Auckland	50m Rifle Prone (Pairs)
Gold medal – first place	1994 Victoria	50m Rifle Prone
Gold medal – first place	1994 Victoria	50m Rifle Prone (Pairs)
Gold medal – first place	1998 Kuala Lumpur	50m Rifle Prone
Silver medal – second place	1990 Auckland	50m Rifle Prone

Stephen Kelly Petterson MNZM (born 2 August 1957) is a competitive rifle shooter from New Zealand.

Petterson was born in Auckland in 1957. A veteran of four Olympic Games and five Commonwealth Games, he has won a total of four gold medals and a silver medal at the Commonwealth Games. He was the flag bearer for New Zealand at the closing ceremony of the 1994 Commonwealth Games.

In the 1999 New Year Honours, Petterson was appointed a Member of the New Zealand Order of Merit, for services to smallbore rifle shooting.

Awards
Preceded by Brenda Lawson	Lonsdale Cup of the New Zealand Olympic Committee; 1994	Succeeded by Chris White
