= Christine Trefry =

Australian sports shooter

Personal information
- Nationality: Australian
- Born: May 10, 1955 (age 71) Cunderdin

Sport
- Sport: Shooting
Medal record
Women's shooting
Representing Australia
Commonwealth Games
Gold medal – first place	1994 Victoria BC	Women's 25 m sport pistol - Pairs
Gold medal – first place	1994 Victoria BC	Women's 25 m sport pistol
Gold medal – first place	1994 Victoria BC	Women's 10m air pistol
Gold medal – first place	1998 Kuala Lumpur	Women's 25 m sport pistol - Pairs
Gold medal – first place	1998 Kuala Lumpur	Women's 25 m sport pistol
Gold medal – first place	1998 Kuala Lumpur	Women's 10m air pistol - Pairs
Silver medal – second place	1998 Kuala Lumpur	Women's 10m air pistol

Christine Trefry (born 10 May 1955 in Cunderdin) is an Australian sport shooter. She tied for fifteenth place in the women's 25 metre pistol event at the 2000 Summer Olympics.
