= Michel Dion (sport shooter) =

Canadian sports shooter (born 1959)

Personal information
- Born: 30 June 1959 (age 66) Quebec City, Quebec, Canada

Sport
- Sport: Sports shooting
Medal record
Representing Canada
Pan American Games
Bronze medal – third place	1995 Mar del Plata	50m rifle prone
Bronze medal – third place	2015 Toronto	50m rifle prone
Commonwealth Games
Gold medal – first place	1994 Victoria	50m rifle 3 positions
Gold medal – first place	1994 Victoria	50m rifle 3 positions pairs
Gold medal – first place	1998 Kuala Lumpur	50m rifle 3 positions pairs
Silver medal – second place	1986 Edinburgh	50m rifle 3 positions pairs
Bronze medal – third place	1994 Victoria	50m rifle prone

Michel Dion (born 30 June 1959) is a Canadian former sports shooter. He competed at the 1992 Summer Olympics and the 1996 Summer Olympics.
