= Sue McCready =

Australian sports shooter

Personal information
- Full name: Susan Valerie McCready
- Nationality: Australia
- Born: 4 April 1981 (age 45) Sunbury, Victoria, Australia
- Height: 1.60 m (5 ft 3 in)
- Weight: 60 kg (132 lb)

Sport
- Sport: Shooting
- Events: 10 m air rifle (AR40); 50 m rifle 3 positions (STR3X20)
- Club: Melbourne International Shooting; Club
- Coached by: Miroslav Sipek
Medal record
Women's shooting
Representing Australia
Commonwealth Games
| Gold medal – first place | 1998 Kuala Lumpur | [[1998 Commonwealth Games#Shooting|]] |
| Silver medal – second place | 2002 Manchester | STR3X20 Pairs |

Susan Valerie McCready (born 4 April 1981 in Sunbury, Victoria) is an Australian sport shooter. Since 1997, McCready had won a total of eleven medals (five golds, four silver, and two bronze) in both air and small-bore rifle at the Oceania Shooting Championships. She also captured a gold medal in the women's 50 m rifle three positions at the 1998 Commonwealth Games in Kuala Lumpur, Malaysia, accumulating a score of 667.3 points. McCready is married to three-time Olympian (2004, 2008, and 2012) and pistol shooter Daniel Repacholi.

McCready made her official debut for the 2000 Summer Olympics in Sydney, where she placed fifteenth in the 10 m air rifle, and twentieth in the 50 m rifle 3 positions, with total scores of 392 and 574 points, respectively.

At the 2004 Summer Olympics in Athens, McCready finished twenty-seventh in the preliminary rounds of the women's 10 m air rifle, with a total score of 391 points, tying her position with four other shooters including South Korea's Seo Sun-hwa. She also accumulated a score of 567 targets (194 in a prone position, 187 in standing, and 186 in kneeling) in her second event, 50 m rifle 3 positions, by two points behind Japan's Hiromi Misaki, finishing only in twenty-fifth place.

Eight years after competing in her first Olympics, McCready qualified for her third Australian team, as a 27-year-old, at the 2008 Summer Olympics in Beijing, by finishing second in the air rifle (AR40) from the 2007 Oceanian Shooting Championships in Sydney. She placed forty-second in the women's 10 m air rifle by one point ahead of Venezuela's Diliana Méndez from the final attempt, with a total score of 386 points. Nearly a week later, McCready competed for her second event, 50 m rifle 3 positions, where she was able to shoot 195 targets in a prone position, 172 in standing, and 183 in kneeling, for a total score of 550 points, finishing only in forty-third place.

== Olympic results ==
| Event | 2000 | 2004 | 2008 |
|---|---|---|---|
| 50 metre rifle three positions | 20th 574 | 25th 567 | 43rd 550 |
| 10 metre air rifle | 15th 392 | 27th 391 | 42nd 386 |
