= Ashok Pandit =

Indian sport shooter

Personal information
- Nationality: Indian

Sport
- Country: India
- Sport: Shooting
Medal record
Commonwealth Games
Bronze medal – third place	1982 Brisbane	Centre-Fire Pistol - Pairs
Gold medal – first place	1990 Auckland	Centre-Fire Pistol
Bronze medal – third place	1990 Auckland	Centre-Fire Pistol – Pairs
Gold medal – first place	1994 Victoria	Centre-Fire Pistol – Pairs
Gold medal – first place	1998 Kuala Lumpur	Centre-Fire Pistol – Pairs
Asian Games
Bronze medal – third place	1994 Hiroshima	25 m center fire pistol team
Bronze medal – third place	1998 Bangkok	25 m center fire pistol team

Ashok Pandit is an Indian sport shooter. He won the first gold in shooting in the Commonwealth Games for India. He was awarded the Arjuna Award in 1985.
