= Greg Yelavich =

New Zealand sport shooter

Greg Yelavich MBE
Personal information
- Full name: Gregory Thomas Yelavich
- Born: 8 March 1957 (age 69) Ōtāhuhu, Auckland, New Zealand
- Height: 1.83 m (6 ft 0 in)
- Weight: 74 kg (163 lb)

Sport
- Country: New Zealand
- Sport: Shooting
Medal record
Shooting
Representing New Zealand
Commonwealth Games
Gold medal – first place	1986 Edinburgh	Free Pistol
Gold medal – first place	1986 Edinburgh	Air Pistol
Silver medal – second place	1990 Auckland	Free Pistol (Pairs)
Silver medal – second place	1990 Auckland	Center-Fire Pistol (Pairs)
Silver medal – second place	1994 Victoria	Free Pistol (Pairs)
Silver medal – second place	2006 Melbourne	Center-Fire Pistol
Silver medal – second place	2010 Delhi	Center-Fire Pistol (Pairs)
Bronze medal – third place	1986 Edinburgh	Air Pistol (Pairs)
Bronze medal – third place	1990 Auckland	Air Pistol (Pairs)
Bronze medal – third place	1994 Victoria	Center-Fire Pistol
Bronze medal – third place	1994 Victoria	Air Pistol
Bronze medal – third place	1998 Kuala Lumpur	Air Pistol

Gregory Thomas Yelavich MBE (born 8 March 1957) is a New Zealand pistol shooter. As well as winning numerous national pistol titles, Yelavich has the distinction of having won more Commonwealth Games medals than any other New Zealander (12). He was the New Zealand flag bearer at the closing ceremony of the 2006 Commonwealth Games. He has represented New Zealand at two Olympic Games — Seoul 1988 and Barcelona 1992.

In 1990, Yelavich was awarded the New Zealand 1990 Commemoration Medal. In the 1995 New Year Honours, he was appointed a Member of the Order of the British Empire, for services to sport.

Yelavich competes in International Shooting Sport Federation ISSF pistol shooting events.

Olympic results
Event	1988	1992
50 metre pistol	41st 535	37th 543
10 metre air pistol	—	22nd 575
