= Shooting at the 1982 Commonwealth Games =

- Venue: Belmont Shooting Complex
- Location: 1485 Old Cleveland Road, Brisbane, Australia
- Dates: 30 September to 9 October 1982

Shooting at the 1982 Commonwealth Games was the fourth appearance of Shooting at the Commonwealth Games. The events were held in Brisbane, Australia, from 30 September to 9 October 1982 and featured contests in twenty disciplines, compared to just six in 1978.

The events took place at the Belmont Shooting Complex.

Australia topped the shooting medal table by virtue of winning seven gold medals.

== Medal table ==
* Host nation (Australia)

Medals won by nation with totals, ranked by number of golds—sortable
Rank	Nation	Gold	Silver	Bronze	Total
1	Australia*	7	3	4	14
2	England	5	8	6	19
3	Canada	3	2	4	9
4	Scotland	3	2	2	7
5	New Zealand	1	1	0	2
6	Hong Kong	1	0	0	1
7	Wales	0	2	1	3
8	Guernsey	0	1	1	2
8	India	0	1	1	2
10	Northern Ireland	0	0	1	1
Totals (10 entries)		20	20	20	60

== Medallists ==
Games	Gold	Silver	Bronze
50m free pistol	(Canada) Tom Guinn	(England) Geoffrey Robinson	(Australia) Phil Adams
50m free pistol pairs	(Australia) Phil Adams; John Tremelling	(New Zealand) Barrie Wickins; Rex Hamilton	(England) Geoffrey Robinson; Frank Wyatt
25m centre-fire pistol	(England) John Cooke	(Scotland) James Cairns	(Australia) Noel Ryan
25m centre-fire pistol pairs	(Australia) Noel Ryan; Alexander Taransky	(India) Mohinder Lal; Ashok Pandit	(England) John Cooke; John Gough
25m rapid-fire pistol	(Hong Kong) Lee Kui Nang	(Canada) Jim Timmerman	(England) John Cooke
25m rapid-fire pistol pairs	(Australia) Peter Heuke; Alexander Taransky	(Scotland) James Cairns; Hugh Hunter	(India) Sharad Chauhan; Ramakrishnan Vijay
10m air pistol	(England) George Darling	(Australia) Phil Adams	(Canada) Tom Guinn
10m air pistol pairs	(Australia) Phil Adams; Gregory Colber	(England) Geoffrey Robinson; George Darling	(Canada) Jim Timmerman; Tom Guinn
50m rifle prone	(Australia) Alan Smith	(England) Malcolm Cooper	(Wales) Bill Watkins
50m rifle prone pairs	(England) Malcolm Cooper; Mike Sullivan	(Wales) Colin Harris; Bill Watkins	(Canada) Patrick Vamplew; Ernest Sopsich
50m rifle 3-pos	(Scotland) Alister Allan	(England) Malcolm Cooper	(Canada) Guy Lorion
50m rifle 3-pos pairs	(England) Malcolm Cooper; Barry Dagger	(Canada) Guy Lorion; Jean-François Sénécal	(Scotland) Alister Allan; Bill MacNeil
Full bore rifle	(Scotland) Arthur Clarke	(Wales) John Vivian	(Guernsey) Charles Trotter
Full bore rifle pairs	(Australia) Keith Affleck; Geoffrey Ayling	(England) John Bloomfield; Dick Rosling	(Northern Ireland) David Calvert; Hazel Mackintosh
10m air rifle	(Canada) Jean-François Sénécal	(Guernsey) Matthew Guille	(England) Malcolm Cooper
10m air rifle pairs	(Scotland) Alister Allan; Bill MacNeil	(England) Malcolm Cooper; Barry Dagger	(Australia) Norbert Jahn; Anton Wurfel
Trap	(England) Peter Boden	(Australia) Terry Rumbel	(England) Peter Croft
Trap pairs	(Australia) Jim Ellis; Terry Rumbel	(England) Peter Croft; Peter Boden	(Scotland) James Young; Martin Girvan
Skeet	(New Zealand) John Woolley	(Australia) Ian Hale	(England) Wally Sykes
Skeet pairs	(Canada) Brian Gabriel; Fred Altmann	(England) Jim Sheffield; Wally Sykes	(Australia) Alec Crikis; Ian Hale

== Results ==
=== 50m free pistol ===
Pos	Athlete	Score
1	(Canada) Tom Guinn	553
2	(England) Geoffrey Robinson	543
3	(Australia) Phil Adams	540
4	(Kenya) Shuaib Adam	538
5	(New Zealand) Rex Hamilton	537
6	(New Zealand) Barrie Wickins	532
7	(Hong Kong) Gilbert U	532
8	(Zimbabwe) Ian Redmond	531
9	(England) Frank Wyatt	531
10	(Northern Ireland) Ken Stanford	530

=== 50m free pistol pairs ===
Pos	Athlete	Score
1	(Australia) Adams & Tremelling	1077
2	(New Zealand) Wickins & Hamilton	1075
3	(England) Robinson & Wyatt	1074
4	(Canada) Guinn & Jans	1071
5	(Zimbabwe) Redmond & Reichert	1048

=== 25m centre-fire pistol ===
Pos	Athlete	Score
1	(England) John Cooke	580
2	(Scotland) James Cairns	579
3	(Australia) Noel Ryan	577
4	(India) Mohinder Lal	575
5	(Australia) Alexander Taransky	570
6	(Scotland) Hugh Hunter	568
7	(Zimbabwe) Ian Redmond	568
8	(Northern Ireland) Ken Stanford	568
9	(Hong Kong) Peter Dawson	562
10	(India) Ashok Pandit	561

=== 25m centre-fire pistol pairs ===
Pos	Athlete	Score
1	(Australia) Ryan & Taransky	1151
2	(India) Lal & Pandit	1138
3	(England) Cooke & Gough	1131
4	(Scotland) Hunter & Cairns	1130
5	(Hong Kong) Dawson & Lee	1101

=== 25m rapid-fire pistol ===
Pos	Athlete	Score
1	(Hong Kong) Solomon Lee	583
2	(Canada) Jim Timmerman	583
3	(England) John Cooke	582
4	(England) Chris Godwin	579
5	(Papua New Guinea) Thomas Craig	578
6	(Scotland) Hugh Hunter	578
7	(Guernsey) Adrian Breton	576
8	(Wales) Tony Bowden	576
9	(India) Sharad Chauhan	575
10	(Papua New Guinea) Robert Bayly	574

=== 25m rapid-fire pistol pairs ===
Pos	Athlete	Score
1	(Australia) Heuke & Taransky	1160
2	(Scotland) Cairns & Hunter	1152
3	(India) Chauhan & Vij	1151
4	(England) Cooke & Godwin	1142
5	(Papua New Guinea) Bayly & Craig	1138

=== 10m air pistol ===
Pos	Athlete	Score
1	(England) George Darling	576
2	(Australia) Phil Adams	573
3	(Canada) Tom Guinn	571
4	(England) Geoffrey Robinson	567
5	(Northern Ireland) Ken Stanford	565
6	(India) Sharad Chauhan	564
7	(Canada) Jim Timmerman	563
8	(Zimbabwe) Ian Redmond	562
9	(Australia) Gregory Colbert	562
10	(New Zealand) Rex Hamilton	562

=== 10m air pistol pairs ===
Pos	Athlete	Score
1	(Australia) Adams & Colbert	1128
2	(England) Robinson & Darling	1126
3	(Canada) (Canada) Timmerman & Guinn	1125
4	(New Zealand) Hamilton & Wickins	1113
5	(Zimbabwe) Redmond & Reichert	1108

=== 50m rifle prone ===
Pos	Athlete	Score
1	(Australia) Alan Smith	1184
2	(England) Malcolm Cooper	1184
3	(Wales) Bill Watkins	1177
4	(Scotland) Alister Allan	1176
5	(Guernsey) Charles Trotter	1174
6	(Wales) Colin Thomas Harris	1173
7	(Australia) Yvonne Hill	1173
8	(Northern Ireland) Cliff Ogle	1171
9	(Scotland) John Knowles	1171
10	(Jersey) Patrick Ryan	1170

=== 50m rifle prone pairs ===
Pos	Athlete	Score
1	(England) Cooper & Sullivan	1187
2	(Wales) Harris & Watkins	1183
3	(Canada) Vamplew & Sopsich	1180
4	(Australia) Smith & Hill	1179
5	(Scotland) Allan, Knowles	1177

=== 50m rifle three-positions ===
Pos	Athlete	Score
1	(Scotland) Alister Allan	1146
2	(England) Malcolm Cooper	1145
3	(Canada) Guy Lorion	1144
4	(England) Barry Dagger	1143
5	(Australia) Anton Raymond Wurfel	1138
6	(Australia) Alan Smith	1133
7	(Wales) David Arnold	1125
8	(Canada) Jean-François Sénécal	1123
9	(Scotland) Bill Macneil	1121
10	(Guernsey) Matthew Guille	1111

=== 50m rifle three-positions pairs ===
Pos	Athlete	Score
1	(England) Cooper & Dagger	2301
2	(Canada) Lorion & Sénécal	2279
3	(Scotland) Allan & MacNeil	2277
4	(Australia) Smith & Wurfel	2272
5	(Zimbabwe) Ablitt & Hardman	2116

=== Full bore rifle Queens prize pair ===
Pos	Athlete	Score
1	(Scotland) Arthur Clarke	387
2	(Wales) John Vivian	385
3	(Guernsey) Charles Trotter	384
4	(Jersey) Barry le Cheminant	383
5	(New Zealand) John Whiteman	383
6	(England) John Bloomfield	383
7	(Papua New Guinea) Graeme Norris	382
8	(Hong Kong) Dick Winney	381
9	(Australia) Keith Affleck	381
10	(Canada) Pat Vamplew	381

=== Full bore rifle Queens prize pair (pairs) ===
Pos	Athlete	Score
1	(Australia) Affleck & Ayling	572
2	(England) Bloomfield & Rosling	570
3	(Northern Ireland) Calvert & Mackintosh	563
4	(Scotland) Clarke & R. Allan	560
5	(Canada) Vamplew & Peden	558

=== 10m air rifle ===
Pos	Athlete	Score
1	(Canada) Jean-François Sénécal	574
2	(Guernsey) Matthew Guille	572
3	(England) Malcolm Cooper	570
4	(Scotland) Alister Allan	565
5	(Canada) Guy Lorion	565
6	(Wales) David Arnold	565
7	(England) Barry Dagger	563
8	(Guernsey) Ian Donaldson	561
9	(Scotland) Bill Macneil	560
10	(Australia) Anton Raymond Wurfel	554

=== 10m air rifle pairs ===
Pos	Athlete	Score
1	(Scotland) Allan & MacNeil	1137
2	(England) Cooper & Dagger	1126
3	(Australia) Jahn & Wurfel	1123
4	(Guernsey) Donaldson & Guille	1117
5	(Canada) Lorion & Sénécal	1116

=== Clay pigeon trap ===
Pos	Athlete	Score
1	(England) Peter Boden	191
2	(Australia) Terry Rumbel	190
3	(England) Peter Croft	190
4	(Australia) Jim Ellis	188
5	(Canada) John Primrose	187
6	(Canada) George Leary	185
7	(Scotland) James Young	184
8	(Wales) Denis Brown	184
9	(Scotland) Martin Girvan	183
10	(India) Mansher Singh	181

=== Clay pigeon trap pairs ===
Pos	Athlete	Score
1	(Australia) Ellis & Rumbel	190
2	(India) Croft & Boden	186
3	(Scotland) Young & Girvan	183
4	(Canada) Leary & Primrose	182
5	(Zimbabwe) Gordon & Conolly	181

=== Skeet ===
Pos	Athlete	Score
1	(New Zealand) John Woolley	197
2	(Australia) Ian Hale	196
3	(England) Wally Sykes	195
4	(Canada) Brian Gabriel	191
5	(Northern Ireland) Trevor West	191
6	(England) Jim Sheffield	189
7	(Australia) Alec Crikis	188
8	(India) Hari S. Sandhu	188
9	(Canada) Fred Altman	187
10	(Cyprus) Mikhalakis Tymbios	187

=== Skeet pairs ===
Pos	Athlete	Score
1	(Canada) Gabriel & Altmann	191
2	(England) Sheffield & Sykes	190
3	(Australia) Crikis & Hale	190
4	(New Zealand) McGowan & Woolley	187
5	(Northern Ireland) Willis & West	183

== See also ==
- List of Commonwealth Games medallists in shooting
