= Shooting at the 1978 Commonwealth Games =

- Venue: Strathcona Shooting Range
- Location: Edmonton, Canada
- Dates: 3 to 12 August 1978

Shooting at the 1978 Commonwealth Games was the third appearance of Shooting at the Commonwealth Games. The competition was held in Edmonton, Canada, from 3 to 12 August 1978.

The events were held at the Strathcona Shooting Range, which was specifically built for the Games. The range consisted of a clubhouse and various distance ranges on 160 acres of land, on the south side of Anthony Henday Drive, which is the modern day Ivor Dent Sports Park (as of 2026).

Competition featured contests in six disciplines. Canada topped the shooting medal table again by virtue of winning four gold medals.

== Medal table ==
* Host nation (Canada)

Medals won by nation with totals, ranked by number of golds—sortable
Rank	Nation	Gold	Silver	Bronze	Total
1	Canada*	4	2	1	7
2	New Zealand	1	0	0	1
2	Scotland	1	0	0	1
4	England	0	3	1	4
5	Wales	0	1	0	1
6	Australia	0	0	2	2
7	Isle of Man	0	0	1	1
7	Trinidad and Tobago	0	0	1	1
Totals (8 entries)		6	6	6	18

== Medallists ==
Games	Gold	Silver	Bronze
50m free pistol	(Canada) Yvon Trempe	(Canada) Edward Jans	(Trinidad and Tobago) Bertram Manhin
25m rapid-fire pistol	(Canada) Jules Sobrian	(England) John Cooke	(Australia) Jeff Farrell
50m rifle prone	(Scotland) Alister Allan	(Wales) Bill Watkins	(Isle of Man) Stewart Watterson
Full bore rifle	(Canada) Desmond Vamplew	(England) James Spaight	(Canada) Pat Vamplew
Trap	(Canada) John Primrose	(Canada) George Leary	(Australia) Terry Rumbel
Skeet	(New Zealand) John Woolley	(England) Paul Bentley	(England) Joe Neville

=== 50 metres free pistol ===
Pos	Athlete	Pts
1	(Canada) Yvon Trempe	543
2	(Canada) Edward Jans	540
3	(Trinidad and Tobago) Bertram Manhin	536
4	(Jersey) Denis Ernest Remon	536
5	(England) Andrew Jackson	535
6	(Australia) Norman Harrison	535
7	(Northern Ireland) Ken Stanford	535
8	(England) David Killick	533
9	(New Zealand) Barrie Wickins	532
10	(Australia) Colin O'Brien	529
11	(Guernsey) Noel Duquemin	529
12	(India) Sharad Chauhan	525
13	(Papua New Guinea) Robert Reynolds	511
14	(Scotland) James McAllister	509
15	(Wales) Peter Williams	508
16	(Jersey) Carol Anne Bartlett	507
17	(Scotland) Donald Westwater	505
18	(Hong Kong) Camilo Pedro	502
19	(Papua New Guinea) Gordon Bosanquet	492
20	(Kenya) John Mwau	490

=== 25 metres rapid-fire pistol ===
Pos	Athlete	Pts
1	(Canada) Jules Sobrian	587
2	(England) John Cooke	581
3	(Australia) Jeffrey Kent Farrell	581
4	(England) Brian Girling	575
5	(Australia) Stephen John Faunt	574
6	(India) Sharad Chauhan	574
7	(New Zealand) Bruce McMillan	573
8	(Jersey) Denis Ernest Remon	571
9	(Northern Ireland) Ken Stanford	571
10	(Canada) William Graham	569
11	(Wales) Tony Bowden	566
12	(Scotland) Hugh Hunter	564
13	(New Zealand) Barry O'Neale	557
14	(Hong Kong) Solomon Lee	553
15	(Papua New Guinea) John Bridge	523
16	(Papua New Guinea) Robert Reynolds	518
17	(Bangladesh) Mohamad Nurul Hoda Iqbal	508
18	(Turks and Caicos Islands) Lewis Astwood	417

=== 50 metres rifle prone ===
Pos	Athlete	Pts
1	(Scotland) Alister Allan	1194
2	(Wales) Bill Watkins	1191
3	(Isle of Man) Stewart W. Watterson	1187
4	(England) Barry Dagger	1187
5	(Wales) Colin Harris	1186
6	(Canada) Arne Sorensen	1185
7	(New Zealand) Ian Ballinger	1185
8	(Sri Lanka) Daya Nadarajasingham	1184
9	(England) Brian Burrage	1182
10	(Jersey) Stephen John Le Couilliard	1181
11	(Scotland) John Knowles	1181
12	(Australia) Donald Brook	1180
13	(Northern Ireland) George Bailie	1180
14	(Canada) Hans Adlhoch	1179
15	(New Zealand) Brian eLacey	1178
16	(Guernsey) Charles Trotter	1177
17	(Australia) Trevor John Penney	1176
18	(Kenya) Shafqat Sheikh	1176
19	(Jersey) Patrick Ryan	1173
20	(Northern Ireland) George Mace	1172

=== Full bore rifle Queens Prize Pair ===
Pos	Athlete	Pts
1	(Canada) Desmond Vamplew	391
2	(England) James Spaight	388
3	(Canada) Pat Vamplew	387
4	(Northern Ireland) David Calvert	387
5	(England) Sam Gilson	386
6	(New Zealand) Maurie Gordon	384
7	(Australia) Geoffrey Ayling	384
8	(Scotland) Neil Fyfe	384
9	(Wales) John Vivian	383
10	(Papua New Guinea) Graeme Norris	382
11	(Guernsey) Michael Martel	382
12	(Jersey) Clifford Mallett	382
13	(Guernsey) Richard Perkins	382
14	(Scotland) Colin McEachran	382
15	(Jersey) Philip Amy	380
16	(Guyana) Paul Archer	380
17	(Wales) Howell Morley	378
18	(Isle of Man) Peter Quilliam	377
19	(New Zealand) John Hastie	376
20	(Australia) Peter Raymond Hallett	376

=== Clay pigeon trap ===
Pos	Athlete	Pts
1	(Canada) John Primrose	186
2	(Canada) George Leary	185
3	(Australia) Terry Rumbel	183
4	(Australia) Eli Ellis	183
5	(New Zealand) Aubrey Bruce Lassen	177
6	(England) Anthony John Smith	175
7	(England) Kenneth Wilson	175
8	(India) Randhir Singh	174
9	(Wales) Denis Brown	171
10	(Scotland) Mark Campbell	170
11	(Wales) Emyr Breese	169
12	(Isle of Man) Peter Kelly	169
13	(Northern Ireland) Tom Hewitt	167
14	(Scotland) Donald Wynn	164
15	(Papua New Guinea) Trevan Clough	163
16	(New Zealand) Brian Cummings	155
17	(Guernsey) John Jackson	154
18	(Guernsey) Robert Brouard	152
19	(Papua New Guinea) Peter Giddings	151

=== Skeet ===
Pos	Athlete	Pts
1	(New Zealand) John Woolley	193
2	(England) Paul Bentley	191
3	(England) Joe Neville	190
4	(Canada) Don Kwasnycia	189
5	(Canada) Fred Altman	189
6	(Australia) Ian Hale	188
7	(Wales) Robert Griffiths	183
8	(Malaysia) Ally Ong	182
9	(Australia) Alec Crikis	181
10	(Scotland) James Dunlop	181
11	(Wales) Roger Rees	180
12	(Guernsey) Stephen Brehaut	179
13	(Malaysia) Edmund Yong	167
14	(India) Gurbir Singh Sandhu	165
15	(India) Hari S. Sandhu	165
16	(Hong Kong) Anthony Chuang	164
17	(Northern Ireland) Trevor West	164
18	(Guernsey) Francis Quin	154
19	(Papua New Guinea) Peter Giddings	136
20	(Papua New Guinea) Leslie Cheung	132
