= Shooting at the 1974 British Commonwealth Games =

- Venue: Various
- Location: West Melton, McLeans Island, Yaldhurst
- Dates: 24 January to 2 February 1974

Shooting at the 1974 British Commonwealth Games was the second appearance of Shooting at the Commonwealth Games. The sport returned to the Games after missing the 1970 edition.

The events were held at three venues around Christchurch; the first was to the northwest of the city on a purpose-built range at McLeans Island. The second was the Christchurch Gun Club's new grounds at Yaldhurst, with the third 20 kilometres west of the city at the West Melton Rifle Range in West Melton.

Competition featured contests in six disciplines, an increase of one from 1966.

Canada topped the shooting medal table by virtue of winning four gold medals.

== Medal table ==
* Host nation (New Zealand)

Medals won by nation with totals, ranked by number of golds—sortable
Rank	Nation	Gold	Silver	Bronze	Total
1	Canada	4	1	0	5
2	Australia	1	1	1	3
3	New Zealand*	1	0	1	2
4	England	0	2	2	4
5	Scotland	0	1	1	2
5	Wales	0	1	1	2
Totals (6 entries)		6	6	6	18

== Medallists ==
Games	Gold	Silver	Bronze
50m free pistol	(Canada) Jules Sobrian	(Australia) Norman Harrison	(England) Laszlo Antal
25m rapid-fire pistol	(Canada) William Hare	(Canada) Jules Sobrian	(New Zealand) Bruce McMillan
50m rifle prone	(Australia) Yvonne Gowland	(Wales) Bill Watkins	(Scotland) Alister Allan
Full bore rifle	(New Zealand) Maurie Gordon	(Scotland) Colin McEachran	(England) James Spaight
Trap	(Canada) John Primrose	(England) Brian Bailey	(Wales) Phil Lewis
Skeet	(Canada) Harry Willsie	(England) Joe Neville	(Australia) Robin Bailey

=== 50 metres free pistol ===
Pos	Athlete	Pts
1	(Canada) Jules Sobrian	549
2	(Australia) Norman Harrison	549
3	(England) Laszlo Antal	543
4	(Canada) Donald Hadford	538
5	(Trinidad and Tobago) Bertram Manhin	538
6	(Australia) Leonard Vivian	536
7	(England) John Cooke	535
8	(Papua New Guinea) Gordon Forsyth	526
9	(Jersey) Denis Ernest Remon	525
10	(Northern Ireland) Ken Stanford	524
11	(Kenya) John Harun	524
12	(Jersey) John Irvine	522
13	(Scotland) Robin Macdonald	520
14	(Scotland) Brian Weld	519
15	(Guernsey) Noel Duquemin	517
16	(Wales) Robert Hassall	509
17	(Papua New Guinea) John Bridge	508
18	(Wales) Richard Cross	508
19	(Guyana) Ronald Guy	456

=== 25 metres rapid-fire pistol ===
Pos	Athlete	Pts
1	(Canada) William Hare	586
2	(Canada) Jules Sobrian	583
3	(New Zealand) Bruce McMillan	581
4	(England) John Cooke	580
5	(Northern Ireland) Ken Stanford	578
6	(England) Tony Clark	578
7	(Wales) Robert Hassall	574
8	(Australia) Ronald Trevorrow	573
9	(Scotland) William Edgar	571
10	(Australia) Peter Osmond Royals	568
11	(Scotland) Brian Weld	567
12	(Jersey) Denis Remon	564
13	(Wales) Terry O'Dwyer	563
14	(New Zealand) John Howat	562
15	(Hong Kong) Solomon Lee	553
16	(Papua New Guinea) Gordon Forsyth	542
17	(Papua New Guinea) Murray Anderson	500

=== 50 metres rifle prone ===
Pos	Athlete	Pts
1	(Australia) Yvonne Gowland	594
2	(Wales) Bill Watkins	591
3	(Scotland) Alister Allan	591
4	(New Zealand) Ian Ballinger	588
5	(Hong Kong) Reginaldo Remedios	587
6	(Guernsey) Charles Trotter	587
7	(Australia) Donald William Brook	586
8	(England) Malcolm Cooper	585
9	(Isle of Man) Edward Corlett	585
10	(Papua New Guinea) David Smith	584
11	(New Zealand) Jack Scott	584
12	(Kenya) Dismus Onyiego	583
13	(Wales) Colin Harris	583
14	(Canada) Bob Cheyne	582
15	(Jersey) Maurice Le Mottee	582
16	(Kenya) Simon Ekeno	581
17	(Papua New Guinea) John Schofield	581
18	(Canada) Edson Warner	580
19	(Isle of Man) David McTaggart	579
20	(Northern Ireland) Bertie Aitkin	578
21	(Jersey) Clifford Mallett	576
22	(England) Frank Balcombe	575
23	(Northern Ireland) William Ward	575
24	(Gibraltar) Francis Napoli	565
25	(Hong Kong) José Lei	463

=== Full bore rifle Queens Prize Pair ===
Pos	Athlete	Pts
1	(New Zealand) Maurie Gordon	387.26
2	(Scotland) Colin McEachran	386.27
3	(England) James Spaight	383.35
4	(Wales) Stanley Gray	383.28
5	(New Zealand) Frank Godfrey	378.25
6	(England) Keith Pilcher	376.23
7	(Wales) John Vivian	375.25
8	(Jersey) Clifford Mallett	373.24
9	(Jersey) Philip Amy	373.17
10	(Kenya) Michael David Ford	371.22
11	(Northern Ireland) William Ward	370.23
12	(Northern Ireland) Ernie Neely	367.20
13	(Canada) Edson Warner	364.19
14	(Isle of Man) Peter Quilliam	360.29
15	(Papua New Guinea) Robert Stewart	360.21
16	(Canada) Alain Marion	303.28

=== Clay pigeon trap ===
Pos	Athlete	Pts
1	(Canada) John Primrose	196
2	(England) Brian Bailey	193
3	(Wales) Philip Lewis	191
4	(Australia) Douglas Wilkin Smith	188
5	(England) Joe Neville	186
5	(New Zealand) Bruce Lassen	186
7	(Canada) Edward Wladichuk	184
7	(Wales) Ronald Bevan	184
9	(Australia) Warren John Charlton	182
9	(Scotland) Louis Stewart	182
11	(Kenya) Robert Carr-Hartley	176
12	(Papua New Guinea) Frederick Rimmer	174
13	(New Zealand) Jim McKenzie	165
14	(Papua New Guinea) Ian Williams	161

=== Skeet ===
Pos	Athlete	Pts
1	(Canada) Harry Willsie	194
2	(England) Joe Neville	191
3	(Australia) Robin Holway Bailey	189
4	(England) Alec Bonnett	189
5	(Wales) Ronald Bevan	187
6	(Malaysia) Ally Ong	187
7	(Wales) Roger Rees	185
8	(Australia) Mark Edward Little	181
9	(New Zealand) Jim McKenzie	180
10	(Papua New Guinea) Dennis Devlin	178
11	(New Zealand) Bruce Anderson	174
12	(Papua New Guinea) Frederick Rimmer	163
13	(Kenya) Robert Carr-Hartley	161
14	(Kenya) Harry Hoareau	147
