= Shooting at the 1986 Commonwealth Games =

- Venue: Barry Buddon Camp
- Location: Carnoustie, Scotland
- Dates: 24 July to 2 August 1986

Shooting at the 1986 Commonwealth Games was the fifth appearance of Shooting at the Commonwealth Games. The events were held in north of Edinburgh near Carnoustie, Scotland, from 4 July to 2 August 1986 and featured contests in twenty disciplines.

The shooting events were held at the Barry Buddon Camp.

England topped the shooting medal table by virtue of winning eight gold medals.

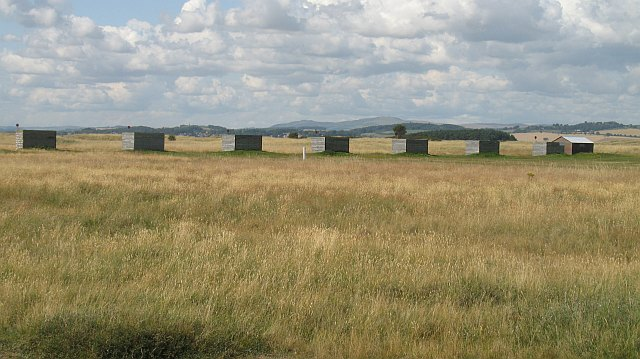
The rifle ranges at Barry Buddon in 2009

== Medal table ==
* Host nation (Scotland)

Medals won by nation with totals, ranked by number of golds—sortable
Rank	Nation	Gold	Silver	Bronze	Total
1	England	8	4	3	15
2	Canada	5	5	4	14
3	Australia	4	7	3	14
4	New Zealand	2	0	3	5
5	Isle of Man	1	0	0	1
6	Scotland*	0	2	2	4
7	Hong Kong	0	1	1	2
7	Northern Ireland	0	1	1	2
9	Guernsey	0	1	0	1
10	Wales	0	0	2	2
Totals (10 entries)		20	21	19	60

== Medallists ==
Event	Gold	Silver	Bronze
50m Free Pistol	Greg Yelavich (NZL)	Phil Adams (AUS)	Ho Kar Fai (HKG)
50m Free Pistol – Pairs	Canada; Tom Guinn; Claude Beaulieu	England; Paul Leatherdale; Richard Wang	Australia; Phil Adams; Ben Sandstrom
25m Centre-Fire Pistol	Bob Northover (ENG)	Phil Adams (AUS)	Rod Hack (AUS)
25m Centre-Fire Pistol – Pairs	Australia; Phil Adams; Rod Hack	England; Bob Northover; Michael Cutler	New Zealand; Rex Hamilton; Barry O'Neale
25m Rapid-Fire Pistol	Pat Murray (AUS)	Adrian Breton (GGY)	Mark Howkins (CAN)
25m Rapid-Fire Pistol – Pairs	England; Brian Girling; Terry Turner	Australia; Pat Murray; Jack Mast	Canada; Mark Howkins; André Chevrefils
10m Air Pistol	Greg Yelavich (NZL)	Tom Guinn (CAN)	Gilbert U (HKG)
10m Air Pistol – Pairs	England; Paul Leatherdale; Ian Reid	Australia; Phil Adams; Bruce Favell	New Zealand; Greg Yelavich; Barrie Wickins
50m Rifle Prone	Alan Smith (AUS)	Alister Allan (SCO)	John Knowles (SCO)
50m Rifle Prone – Pairs	Canada; Michael Ashcroft; Gale Stewart	Australia; Donald Brook; Alan Smith	Wales; Terry Wakefield; Colin Harris
50m Rifle Three Positions	Malcolm Cooper (ENG)	Alister Allan (SCO)	Jean-François Sénécal (CAN)
50m Rifle Three Positions – Pairs	England; Malcolm Cooper; Sarah Cooper	Canada; Jean-François Sénécal; Michel Dion	Scotland; Alister Allan; Bill MacNeil
Full Bore Rifle	Stan Golinski (AUS)	Alain Marion (CAN)	John Bloomfield (ENG)
Full Bore Rifle – Pairs	Canada; Bill Baldwin; Alain Marion	Australia; James Corbett; Stan Golinski	Northern Ireland; David Calvert; Martin Millar
10m Air Rifle	Guy Lorion (CAN)	Sharon Bowes (CAN)	Malcolm Cooper (ENG)
10m Air Rifle – Pairs	Canada; Guy Lorion; Sharon Bowes	Australia; Wolfgang Jobst; Anton Wurfel	England; Malcolm Cooper; Robert Smith
Trap	Ian Peel (ENG)	Peter Boden (ENG)	Roland Phillips (WAL)
Trap – Pairs	England; Peter Boden; Ian Peel	Northern Ireland; Tom Hewitt; Eamon Furphy	Australia; Terry Rumbel; Domingo Diaz
Skeet	Nigel Kelly (IOM)	Joe Neville (ENG)	Brian Gabriel (CAN)
Skeet – Pairs	England; Joe Neville; Ken Harman	Canada; Brian Gabriel; Don Kwasyncia	New Zealand; John Woolley; Jeff Farrell

== Results ==
=== 50m Free pistol ===
Pos	Athlete	Score
1	(New Zealand) Greg Yelavich	551
2	(Australia) Phil Adams	549
2	(Hong Kong) Ho Kar Fai	549
4	(New Zealand) Rex Hamilton	547
5	(Canada) Tom Guinn	547
6	(Australia) Ben Sandstrom	545
7	(Hong Kong) Gilbert U	540
8	(Canada) Claude Beaulieu	538
9	(England) Richard Wang	537
10	(Scotland) Ian Lang	536

=== 50m Free pistol – pairs ===
Pos	Athlete	Score
1	(Canada) Tom Guinn & Claude Beaulieu	1099
2	(England) Paul Leatherdale & Richard Wang	1090
3	(Australia) Phil Adams & Ben Sandstrom	1085
4	(Hong Kong) Gilbert U & Ho Kar Fai	1085
5	(New Zealand) Greg Yelavich & Rex Hamilton	1067

=== 25m Centre-Fire pistol ===
Pos	Athlete	Score
1	(England) Bob Northover	583
2	(Australia) Phil Adams	582
3	(Australia) Rod Hack	580
4	(New Zealand) Rex Hamilton	579
5	(New Zealand) Barry O'Neale	577
6	(England) Michael Cutler	577
7	(Scotland) Stuart Rankine	575
8	(Scotland) Jim Tollan	575
9	(Northern Ireland) Ken Stanford	572
10	(Wales) David Nash	571

=== 25m Centre-Fire pistol – pairs ===
Pos	Athlete	Score
1	(Australia) Phil Adams & Rod Hack	1165
2	(England) Bob Northover & Michael Cutler	1157
3	(New Zealand) Rex Hamilton & Barry O'Neale	1153
4	(Scotland) Stuart Rankine & Jim Tollan	1139
5	(Wales) David Nash & Steven Mitchell	1137

=== 25m Rapid-Fire pistol ===
Pos	Athlete	Score
1	(Australia) Pat Murray	591
2	(Guernsey) Adrian Breton	588
3	(Canada) Mark Howkins	585
4	(Wales) Gareth Irving	582
5	(England) Brian Girling	581
6	(Canada) Andre Chevrefils	581
7	(Australia) Jack William Mast	580
8	(Scotland) Hugh Love	577
9	(Scotland) Hugh Hunter	577
10	(Wales) Michael Jay	576

=== 25m Rapid-Fire pistol – pairs ===
Pos	Athlete	Score
1	(England) Brian Girling & Terry Turner	1169
2	(Australia) Pat Murray & Jack Mast	1152
3	(Canada) Mark Howkins & André Chevrefils	1150
4	(Wales) Gareth Irving & Michael Jay	1150
5	(Hong Kong) Chung-Kin Ho & Gilbert U	1145

=== 10m Air pistol ===
Pos	Athlete	Score
1	(New Zealand) Greg Yelavich	575
2	(Canada) Tom Guinn	574
3	(Hong Kong) Gilbert U	574
4	(Australia) Phil Adams	572
5	(England) Paul Leatherdale	571
6	(New Zealand) Barrie Wickins	570
7	(England) Ian Reid	569
8	(Canada) Richard Horne	565
9	(Scotland) Ian Lang	562
10	(Scotland) Stuart Rankine	562

=== 10m Air Pistol – pairs ===
Pos	Athlete	Score
1	(England) Paul Leatherdale & Ian Reid	1143
2	(Australia) Phil Adams & Bruce Favell	1143
3	(New Zealand) Greg Yelavich & Barrie Wickins	1140
4	(Canada) Richard Horne & Tom Guinn	1136
5	(Hong Kong) Gilbert U & Kar-Fai Ho	1124

=== 50m Rifle prone ===
Pos	Athlete	Score
1	(Australia) Alan Smith	599
2	(Scotland) Alister Allan	598
3	(Scotland) John Knowles	597
4	(Canada) Gale Stewart	597
5	(Wales) Terry Wakefield	596
6	(Wales) Colin Thomas Harris	596
7	(Australia) Donald Brook	595
8	(New Zealand) Stephen Petterson	594
9	(Northern Ireland) Cliff Ogle	594
10	(England) Sarah Cooper	594

=== 50m Rifle prone – pairs ===
Pos	Athlete	Score
1	(Canada) Michael Ashcroft & Gale Stewart	1175
2	(Australia) Donald Brook & Alan Smith	1171
3	(Wales) Terry Wakefield & Colin Harris	1165
4	(Jersey) Patrick Ryan & Stephen Le Couilliard	1162
4	(New Zealand) Roger Harvey & Stephen Petterson	1162

=== 50m Rifle three-positions ===
Pos	Athlete	Score
1	(England) Malcolm Cooper	1170
2	(Scotland) Alister Allan	1167
3	(Canada) Jean-François Sénécal	1150
4	(Canada) Michel Dion	1148
5	(Guernsey) Matthew Guille	1139
6	(New Zealand) Eddie Adlam	1136
7	(Australia) Donald Brook	1134
8	(England) Sarah Cooper	1128
9	(Australia) Alan Smith	1125
10	(Wales) David Arnold	1121

=== 50m Rifle three-positions – pairs ===
Pos	Athlete	Score
1	(England) Malcolm Cooper & Sarah Cooper	2278
2	(Canada) Jean-François Sénécal & Michel Dion	2276
3	(Scotland) Alister Allan & Bill MacNeil	2241
4	(Australia) Donald Brook & Alan Smith	2234
5	(Guernsey) Matthew Guille & Ian Donaldson	2207

=== Full Bore rifle Queens prize pair ===
Pos	Athlete	Score
1	(Australia) Stan John Golinski	396
2	(Canada) Alain Marion	396
3	(England) John Bloomfield	395
4	(Australia) James Corbett	395
5	(Scotland) Richard Simpson	394
6	(Guernsey) Robert Courtney	393
7	(Jersey) Barry le Cheminant	393
8	(Scotland) Arthur Clarke	391
9	(England) Nick Crawshaw	391
10	(Northern Ireland) David Calvert	390

=== Full Bore Rifle Queens prize pair - pairs ===
Pos	Athlete	Score
1	(Canada) Bill Baldwin & Alain Marion	583
2	(Australia) James Corbett & Stan Golinski	583
3	(Northern Ireland) David Calvert & Martin Millar	582
4	(England) John Bloomfield & Nick Crawshaw	582
5	(New Zealand) Chester Burt & Frank Godfrey	582

=== 10m Air rifle ===
Pos	Athlete	Score
1	(Canada) Guy Lorion	588
2	(Canada) Sharon Bowes	583
3	(England) Malcolm Cooper	582
4	(Australia) Anton Raymond Wurfel	578
5	(Guernsey) Matthew Guille	578
6	(Scotland) Bill MacNeil	577
7	(Wales) David Arnold	576
8	(New Zealand) Eddie Adlam	574
9	(Wales) Stewart Daltrey	573
10	(England) Robert Smith	572

=== 10m Air rifle – pairs ===
Pos	Athlete	Score
1	(Canada) Guy Lorion & Sharon Bowes	1167
2	(Australia) Wolfgang Jobst & Anton Wurfel	1151
3	(England) Malcolm Cooper & Robert Smith	1146
4	(Guernsey) Matthew Guille & Ian Donaldson	1137
4	(Scotland) Alister Allan & Bill MacNeil	1137

=== Clay pigeon trap ===
Pos	Athlete	Score
1	(England) Ian Peel	195
2	(England) Peter Boden	192
3	(Wales) Roland Phillips	192
4	(Scotland) Martin Girvan	189
5	(Australia) Terry Rumbel	189
6	(Canada) John Primrose	188
7	(Canada) George Leary	188
8	(Australia) Domingo Diaz	187
9	(Wales) Stuart Clubbe	184
10	(Northern Ireland) Tom Hewitt	184

=== Clay pigeon trap – pairs ===
Pos	Athlete	Score
1	(England) Peter Boden & Ian Peel	185
2	(Northern Ireland) Tom Hewitt & Eamon Furphy	183
3	(Australia) Terry Rumbel & Domingo Diaz	183
4	(Canada) John Primrose & George Leary	183
5	(Scotland) Martin Girvan & Sandy Dunbar	180

=== Skeet ===
Pos	Athlete	Score
1	(Isle of Man) Nigel Kelly	196
2	(England) Joe Neville	195
3	(Canada) Brian Gabriel	195
4	(New Zealand) Laurence John Woolley	194
5	(England) Kenneth Harman	193
6	(Scotland) Ian Marsden	193
7	(New Zealand) John Farrell	192
8	(Scotland) Jim Dunlop	190
9	(Canada) Don Kwasnycia	190
10	(Northern Ireland) Albert Thompson	188

=== Skeet – pairs ===
Pos	Athlete	Score
1	(England) Joe Neville & Ken Harman	195
2	(Canada) Brian Gabriel & Don Kwasyncia	193
3	(New Zealand) John Woolley & Jeff Farrell	189
4	(Australia) Alec Crikis & Ian Hale	188
5	(Isle of Man) Nigel Kelly & Andrew McKeown	187

== See also ==
- List of Commonwealth Games medallists in shooting
