= Peter Croft =

Peter Croft may refer to:

- Peter Croft (physician), English physician and primary care researcher
- Peter Downton Croft (1933–2021), English field hockey player and cricketer
- Peter Croft (climber) (born 1958), rock climber and mountaineer
- Peter Croft (sport shooter) (born 1950), English sport shooter
