= Peter Boden =

British sports shooter (born 1947)

Personal information
- Full name: Peter Boden
- Born: 18 September 1947 (age 79) Newcastle-under-Lyme, Staffordshire, England
- Height: 175 cm (5 ft 9 in)
- Weight: 97 kg (214 lb)

Sport
- Sport: Sports shooting
Medal record
Representing England
Commonwealth Games
Gold medal – first place	1982 Brisbane	Clay Pigeon Trap
Gold medal – first place	1986 Edinburgh	Trap (Pairs)
Silver medal – second place	1982 Brisbane	Trap (Pairs)
Silver medal – second place	1986 Edinburgh	Clay Pigeon Trap

Peter Boden (born 18 September 1947) is a British former sports shooter. He specialised in Olympic Trap clay pigeon shooting.

Boden competed at four Summer Olympics; the 1976 Summer Olympics, 1984 Summer Olympics, 1996 Summer Olympics and 2000 Summer Olympics.

Boden also qualified for the Moscow 1980 Summer Olympics but the GB shooting team withdrew due to political reasons.

He represented England and won a gold medal in the clay pigeon trap and a silver medal in the trap pairs with Peter Croft, at the 1982 Commonwealth Games in Brisbane, Queensland, Australia. Four years later he represented England and won a silver medal in the clay pigeon trap and a gold medal in the trap pairs with Ian Peel, at the 1986 Commonwealth Games in Edinburgh, Scotland.

Boden was also five-times British Grand Prix Champion - 1975, 1980, 1983 (joint), 1993 and 1999.

== Early shooting career ==
Boden first started shooting at the age of 12, when he did some 'rough shooting' for pigeons and rabbits at farms near to his Bedworth home. He then slowly developed his talent during a long apprenticeship at local shoots. He was a member of both Fillongley and Berkswell shooting clubs.

Boden's first national title was the British Open Double Rise Championship at Doncaster, in March 1970. He scored a the-then record points total of 182 from 200.

His second title followed just a month later at Bisley, where he won the English Open Double Rise Championship, with a score of 173 (after a shoot-off).

It was in 1973 that he was first called up into the GB Universal Trench (5-Trap) Team. This would be his first taste of international shooting.

== Olympic Games ==
In 1976, Boden headed off to Montreal for his first ever Olympic Games. He was accompanied by fellow trapshooter, Malcolm Jenkins of Dunstable. Boden did not start well in his pursuit of a medal. On the first day, his score was well below his usual standard, hitting just 63 from 75. This left him down in 27th position. On Day-2, his score slightly improved, 68 from 75, which moved him up into 20th position. But on the final day he hit only 38 from 50, giving him a final score of 169 from 200 targets. Overall, he finished 28th. However, Jenkins fared better, finishing 18th, with a score of 177. All three days at the L’Acadie Range were marred by very strong winds, especially the last day when shooters were faced with near gale-force conditions. American Don Haldeman won the gold medal with a score of 190. Due to the events of the Munich Games four years earlier; heavy security was in force for all athletes, but especially the shooting teams. But Boden, was not impressed with some of the security arrangements. During the games he said that every journey from the Olympic Village to the shooting range they had a police escort with a helicopter hovering overhead. Ironically, on every trip so far, the security guards on the bus, have fallen asleep—and one day they had to wake one of them up, to tell him we had arrived! He added that we spend about 10 hours a day getting to and from the site, and of that we were shooting for about 80 minutes.

At the Los Angeles Games in 1984, Boden finished in 14th place, shooting a 25-straight in his final round. He finished with a score of 185 from 200—11 below his personal best. His GB teammate, Peter Croft, scored 183, finishing in equal 17th. The intense heat (in the high 90s) and gusting winds did not help the shooters. Boden, though, was not happy about some of the organisation at the purpose-built Prado Shooting Range. He had now been to three major North American competitions and had found that the organisation is nothing like the events that are held in Europe and other countries. But he put the blame firmly on the international governing body for not making sure everything was done correctly. He was particularly concerned with the way some of the traps were not in the correct positions. On one trap he scored 74 from 75, but on others, his form suddenly dipped. He also couldn’t understand why cars were driving so close to the shooting area. But he conceded that they do things their own way on this side of the Atlantic, but it’s not the proper way. Italian Luciano Giovannetti won gold with 192 after a shoot-off with Peruvian Francisco Boza (silver) and American Daniel Carlisle (bronze).

In the 1996 Atlanta Olympic Games, Boden started well at the Wolf Creek Shooting Ground, about 20 miles outside of Atlanta. On the first day he missed only one target out of 75. This left him in joint-fourth position, with six others, including the eventual gold medal winner. On the last day he hit 47 from 50 (24 and 23), giving him a final total of 121 from 125. But those three missed targets on the final day moved him out of medal contention, and he finished 9th. However, this was Boden’s best Olympic result, bettering his 1984 Los Angeles position of 14th. His teammate, Kevin Gill, came 37th with a score of 117. Australian Michael Diamond took the gold medal with a score of 149 from 150. 58 competitors took part.

Following the quota place debacle, Boden finally arrived at the 2000 Sydney Olympic Games.The GB clay shooting team did not make use of the crowded Olympic Village. In advance they had decided to rent a house nearer to the Sydney International Shooting Centre at Cecil Park. This was so they could be totally focused on the job in hand—winning medals. Boden was approaching his 53rd Birthday during the games, so he knew that Sydney might well be his Olympic swansong. Consequently, every ounce of concentration was needed. However, it didn’t start well for him, as he hit only 63 from 75 on the first day. He fared slightly better on the second day, shooting 45 from 50. His final score of 108 was a great disappointment, finishing down in joint 26th place. Meanwhile, teammate Ian Peel did Great Britain proud by taking the silver medal with a score of 142 (118+24) from 150—five targets behind gold medallist, Australian Michael Diamond. Another proud Brit was Double Trap shooter Richard Faulds MBE, who came from behind to take gold following a tense shoot-off with Australian Russell Mark after they finished level on 187 from 200.

== Commonwealth Games ==
By 1982, Boden had risen to the top of British Olympic Trap shooting, and it was no surprise he gained selection to represent England at the Commonwealth Games in Brisbane. After missing out on the Moscow Olympics in 1980, he was glad to be involved in such a major event again. Along with teammate Peter Croft, he was in strong contention for medals, but they were under no illusions about the fierce challenge from the Australians, who would be difficult to overcome on their own patch. First up was the team event over 200 targets. The Australian team of Terry Rumbel and Jim Ellis won gold with a score of 190, finishing four targets clear of England. Croft scoring 94 and Boden 92. For Boden, it was a disappointing performance; his score was well below his usual standard, but at least he had won a silver medal. However, in the individual competition, Boden fared much better. Going into the final round of 25, he was in with a chance, trailing Rumbel by just two targets. Ultimately, the pressure told on the Australian at the windy Belmont Range; he dropped three targets, to finish on 190. Boden did not falter, and shooting a perfect 25-straight he took gold by a solitary target with a score of 191. Croft shot 24 in the final round to take bronze on 190—the same score as Rumbel—but missed out on silver due to the countback rule.

In 1986, Boden was once again representing England at the Commonwealth Games. It was closer to home this time, taking place in Edinburgh, Scotland. He again came away with two medals, just as he had done in Australia four years earlier. However, this time the medals were reversed; taking individual silver and the team (pairs) gold. During the 200-target team competition at Kippen Gun Club, Stirling, 40 miles from Edinburgh, Boden was not at his best. Luckily, his teammate Ian Peel was in magnificent form, shooting 98 from his 100 targets. Even though Boden only hit 87, their combined score of 185 was enough to edge out Northern Ireland and Australia, who both finished on 183. In the individual event, Boden returned to his best form. After day one, he found himself in fifth place, three behind the leader, forcing him to draw on all his vast experience to secure the silver. It ultimately came down to a shoot-off against Welshman Roland Rees-Phillips, after they finished level on 192. Boden hit a flawless 25-straight, while Rees-Phillips could only manage 23. Meanwhile, Ian Peel continued his top-class form to win the gold medal with a score of 195, securing a double gold for the 28-year-old.

== World Championship ==
At the 1981 World Olympic Trap Championships, Boden came away with a bronze team medal at the San Miguel de Tucuman Shooting Range, in Argentina. His GB teammates included: Peter Croft, James Young and John Tennison. Croft was the highest placed British shooter on 193.

In November 1991, Boden picked-up three medals at the World Championships in Perth, Australia. He became the Individual World Champion at Double Trap, scoring a total of 173, two targets ahead of American, Bret Erickson. He then won the team gold medal; also in Double Trap with GB teammates, Peter Croft and Kevin Gill. Boden and his two teammates also picked-up the silver medal in the Olympic Trap competition. Boden was the top British shooter on 191.

== British Olympic Trap Grand Prix - Five-times winner ==
In August 1975, at the North Wales Shooting School, near Chester, Boden won his first major national title. He won the coveted Rolex Olympic Trap British Grand Prix, after a shoot-off with rival, John Tennison. They had finished level on 192 after two days of shooting.

Boden next won in 1980. In another shoot-off, he defeated Canadian, Edward Shaske, a former Olympian of the 1968 Summer Olympics.

In 1981, Boden had to settle for second place at the Grand Prix with a score of 189. He was two targets behind Dutchman, Bean van Limbeek.

With qualification for the following year's Olympics high on his priorities, 1983 would turn out to be a good year for Boden. He won the Rolex Grand Prix for the third time, a feat not achieved by many shooters since it began in 1958. Boden had finished level with Kevin Borley on 194, so a shoot-off was required. After two rounds of 25, they were still level—on 50 each. In the final round, Boden missed a target to finish on 24. Borley was going straight, but missed his final target to take the title outright. It was decided that they should share the title.

Ten years later, in July 1993, Boden won the Rolex for a fourth time. This put him one title behind, Bob Braithwaite, the 1968 Olympic gold medallist. Braithwaite won the Rolex five times in just six years.

In July 1999, Boden won the event for a fifth time. Twenty-four years after his first success, he equalled the record set by Bob Braithwaite. This year’s event, now re-branded as the Perazzi Classic British Grand Prix, was held for the first time at Southern Counties Shooting Ground in Dorset. Boden now in the twilight of his career, was on a mission, and he didn’t disappoint his supporters. Over the course of the three days, Australian Russell Mark had matched Boden target by target, they finished level on 193, with the 25-bird final to follow. But it was tight behind them with eight shooters on 192. (All of which had to go through a single-barrel shoot-off to send four into the six-man final). In the final, Boden and Mark continued to mirror each other, but to the shock of the crowd, Mark missed his last target. This was the chance that Boden had been waiting for, and he made no mistake—he smoked his last target, and a fifth Grand Prix title was his. Ian Peel took bronze on 192+25. To the delight of the event sponsors, Boden won using a Perazzi gun. His new employers, cartridge manufacturers, Lyalvale Express, were also happy as he used their ammunition.

== Birmingham Olympic Trap Grand Prix - 1994 - 100 Straight ==
At the Famous Grouse Birmingham Grand Prix at Garlands Shooting Ground, near Tamworth, in July 1994, he shot the perfect 100-straight. For his efforts he won a car—a £15,000 VW Golf Gti. At the time this was the biggest ever prize achieved in domestic clay pigeon competition. Hitting only 95 on the first day of the 2-day event, he still managed to overcome the other 115 competitors with a score of 195, two targets clear of second placed, Andreous Kalekas.

== Scottish Olympic Trap Grand Prix - Loch Ness ==
The Cleg Incident

Boden was in good form during 1983 and it continued at the Loch Ness Gun Club, Bhlaraidh, near Invermoriston, where he won the Winchester-sponsored Scottish Olympic Trap Grand Prix. The event was also was a GB Selection Shoot.

After day one, Boden and GB teammate, Peter Croft were tied on 96 each. But on day two, a cleg (horsefly) disrupted the final round of 25. After seven rounds of shooting (175 targets), Boden and Croft had matched each other target for target—until the ‘cleg incident’ occurred. Boden had shot a perfect final round to finish on 194, meaning Croft needed to do the same to force a shoot-off for the top prize. After he had hit his 22nd target, a tie looked likely. However, just when he was about to take his next shot, the offending cleg landed on his arm. He killed it quickly before it could bite him, but his concentration was broken, and he missed the target—leaving Boden the winner by one target.

Back at Loch Ness in 1984, Peter Croft was in unstoppable form, with a mammoth score of 198, outscoring Boden by five targets.

In the 1985 staging of the event, Boden regained the title, scoring 195, two targets clear of eventual runner-up, Ian Peel, who had to go through a 75 bird shoot-off with Malcolm Jenkins.

== English Olympic Trap Grand Prix -1983 ==
At Garlands Shooting Ground, near Tamworth in 1983, he won The English Open Olympic Trap Grand Prix with a score of 195, two ahead of second placed Kevin Borley. This was the final GB Selection Shoot before the 1984 Summer Olympics in Los Angeles, Boden's victory ultimately secured his place at the games. The event at Garland's was sponsored by a Cuban cigar company. Boden walked away with the 'Punch Cigars Challenge Trophy'.

== European Championship - 1999 - The Poussan Fiasco ==
In September 1999, Boden was part of the GB Team that travelled to Poussan, near Montpellier in Southern France to contest the European Championships. It was an important event as the GB Team were shooting for quota places at next year’s Olympic Games in Sydney. As with all European Championships it was hard going for the team. In the 125-bird event, where targets were some of the fastest ever encountered, Boden shot 114 (24, 24, 22, 24, 20). His final round was almost a complete disaster after he missed the first two targets out. His 114 left him tied with four others. So, an intense single-barrel shoot-off was required, but only two would be rewarded with quota places. However, Boden had been here before, and his vast experience and determination were on his side. He hit the first target out, then two no-birds followed—enough to unsettle any shooter on the planet. But when the second target finally came out, ice-cool Boden made no mistake, it was powdered, and that was enough—he had booked his ticket to Sydney—or so he thought. Ian Peel (who had already gained a quota place last year) finished a creditable 4th, with a score of 118+25+2 (after a shoot-off for second place). Boden, Peel and James Birkett-Evans also managed to come third in the team event.

But a few weeks after the European Championships, Boden’s quota place was withdrawn by the governing body, the International Shooting Sport Federation (ISSF). They claimed there shouldn't have been a shoot-off for the final two quota places, and that the qualifying places should have been decided on countback. Boden lodged an appeal against the decision, and the long, long, wait began. After 10 months of deliberation, they finally announced their decision, ironically, on the eve of the 2000 European Championships in Italy. They decided that as organisers of the European Championships, it had been their problem, and it was decided that to be fair to everyone, all competitors in the shoot-off should go to Sydney. So, Boden was definitely on the plane to his fourth Olympic Games.

== Miscellaneous ==
Even away from the shooting range in 1983, Boden was winning prizes. In recognition of his achievements at the previous years Commonwealth Games, he was awarded the 'Sporting Personality of the Year' by Nuneaton & Bedworth Sports Council. Unfortunately he was not present at the ceremony to receive his award, as he was away in Canada, shooting in the World Championships.

In September 1993, Boden was a member of the winning England team at the Home Countries International Olympic Trap Competition, at Chatcombe Estate Shooting School, near Cheltenham. With a total score of 1,131, England won by 16 targets from second placed Scotland, 20 ahead of Wales and 27 clear of Ireland. Boden was the third highest English shooter on 190, one behind James Garland and two behind Peter Croft. High Gun of the event was Ireland's David Evans with an excellent score of 194.

== Working Life ==
Boden was an engineer by trade and during the 1970s/1980s worked for the now defunct, Wickman Wimet, (later Sandvik) in Coventry. Here, he was a highly skilled Diamond Turner of tungsten carbide hard metal. After leaving Sandvik, his hobby became his livelihood in 1989 as a shooting coach at Garlands Shooting Ground. In the late 1990s he became an employee of cartridge manufacturers, Lyalvale Express .
