= Anthony Chivers =

Anthony Chivers may refer to:

- Anthony Chivers (athlete) (1920–2015), English long-distance runner
- Anthony Chivers (sport shooter) (1936–2026), British sports shooter
