= England at the 1982 Commonwealth Games =

- CG code: ENG
- CGA: Commonwealth Games England

in Brisbane, Queensland, Australia
- Medals Ranked 2nd: Gold 38 Silver 38 Bronze 32 Total 108

Commonwealth Games appearances (overview)
- 1930; 1934; 1938; 1950; 1954; 1958; 1962; 1966; 1970; 1974; 1978; 1982; 1986; 1990; 1994; 1998; 2002; 2006; 2010; 2014; 2018; 2022; 2026; 2030

England competed at the 1982 Commonwealth Games in Brisbane, Queensland, Australia, from 30 September to 9 October 1982.

England finished second in the medal table behind Australia with 38 gold medals, 38 silver medals and 32 bronze medals.

== Medal table (top three) ==
Rank	Nation	Gold	Silver	Bronze	Total
1	Australia	39	39	29	107
2	England	38	38	32	108
3	Canada	26	23	33	82
Totals (3 entries)		103	100	94	297

The athletes that competed are listed below.

== Archery ==
Name	Event/s	Medal/s
Mark Blenkarne	individual	1 x gold
Charlotte Calladine	individual	
Peter Gillam	individual	
Steven Hallard	individual	
Eileen Robinson	individual	
Brenda Thomas	individual	

== Athletics ==
Name	Event/s	Medal/s
David Abrahams	high Jump	
Shireen Bailey	800m	
Lorraine Baker	800m	
Helen Barnett	200m	
Todd Bennett	400m, 4x400m relay	1 x gold
Paul Blagg	30 km walk	
Lorna Boothe	100m hurdles	1 x bronze
Christina Boxer	1,500m	1 x gold
Phil Brown	400m, 4x400m relay	1 x gold
Lesley Bryant	discus	
Beverley Callender	200m, 4x100 relay	1 x gold
Keith Connor	triple jump	1 x gold
Garry Cook	800m, 4x400m relay	1 x gold
Kathy Cook	200m, 4x100 & 4x400 relay	1 x gold, 1 x silver
Ann-Marie Cording	high Jump	
Steve Cram	1,500m	1 x gold
Gillian Dainty	1,500m	1 x silver
Diana Davies	high Jump	
Paul Davies-Hale	3,000m steeplechase	
Paul Dickenson	hammer	
Verona Elder	400m Hurdles	
James Evans	100m, 4x100 relay	
Graeme Fell	3,000m steeplechase	1 x silver
Linda Jane Forsyth	400m	
Sharon Gibson	javelin	
Julian Goater	10,000m	1 x bronze
Mike Gratton	marathon	1 x bronze
Wilbert Greaves	110/400m hurdles	
Jeff Gutteridge	pole vault	1 x silver
Sue Hearnshaw	long jump	
John Herbert	long Jump/triple jump	
Mark Holtom	110m hurdles	1 x silver
Wendy Hoyte	100m, 4x100 relay	1 x gold
Joslyn Hoyte-Smith	400m, 4x400 relay	1 x bronze
Tim Hutchings	5,000m	
Beverly Kinch	long Jump	1 x bronze
Harry King	100m, 4x100 relay	
Sonia Lannaman	100m, 4x100 relay	1 x gold
Angela Littlewood	shot put	
Judy Livermore	100m hurdles/heptathlon	1 x silver
Mike McFarlane	100/200m, 4x100 relay	1 x gold
Chris McGeorge	800m	1 x bronze
Mike McLeod	10,000m	
Roger Mills	30 km Walk	
David Moorcroft	5,000m	1 x gold
Aston Moore	triple jump	1 x bronze
Susan Morley	400m hurdles	
Gary Oakes	400m hurdles	
Judy Oakes	shot Put	1 x gold
Heather Oakes	100m	
Fidelis Obikwu	decathlon	1 x bronze
David Ottley	javelin	
Ruth Partridge	3,000m	
Debbie Peel	3,000m	
Janette Picton	discus	
Kathryn Pilling	1,500m	
Ian Ray	marathon	
Donovan Reid	200m, 4x100 relay	
Colin Reitz	1500m, 3,000 steeplechase	
Simon Rodhouse	shot put	
Nick Rose	5,000m	1 x silver
Steve Scutt	400m, 4x400m relay	1 x gold
Barbara Simmonds	High Jump	1 x bronze
Richard Slaney	discus	
Ray Smedley	marathon	
Wendy Smith	3,000m	1 x silver
Charlie Spedding	10,000m	
Ian Stewart	1,500m	
Keith Stock	pole vault	
Shirley Strong	100m hurdles	1 x gold
Pete Tancred	discus	
Gladys Taylor	400m, 4x400 relay	
Daley Thompson	decathlon/long jump/pole vault	1 x gold
Kathryn Warren	heptathlon	
Buster Watson	200m	
Fatima Whitbread	javelin	1 x bronze
Robert Weir	discus/hammer	1 x gold
Lynda Whiteley	discus	1 x bronze
Michael Ian Whittingham	400m hurdles	
Mike Winch	shot put	1 x silver
Yvette Wray	400m hurdles, 4x400 relay	1 x bronze
Peter Yates	javelin	

== Badminton ==
Name	Event/s	Medal/s
Steve Baddeley	singles, team event	1 x gold
Duncan Bridge	singles, doubles, mixed, team event	1 x gold, 1 x silver
Karen Beckman	singles, doubles, mixed, team event	1 x gold, 2 x silver
Karen Chapman	doubles, mixed, team event	2 x gold, 1 x bronze
Gillian Clark	singles, doubles, mixed, team event	1 x gold, 1 x silver, 1 x bronze
Martin Dew	doubles, mixed, team event	2 x gold, 1 x silver
Sally Podger	singles, doubles, mixed, team event	1 x gold, 1 x silver, 1 x bronze
Dipak Tailor	singles, doubles, mixed, team event	1 x gold
Helen Troke	singles, team event	2 x gold
Nick Yates	singles, doubles, mixed, team event	1 x gold, 2 x silver

== Bowls ==
Name	Event/s	Medal/s
Tommy Armstrong	fours	
Len Bowden	fours	
Bill Hobart	pairs	
Jimmy Hobday	fours	
Peter Line	pairs	
Norma Shaw	triples	1 x bronze
Mavis Steele	triples	1 x bronze
Betty Stubbings	triples	1 x bronze
George Turley	fours	
Alan Windsor	singles	

== Boxing ==
Name	Event/s	Medal/s
Nick Croombes	71 kg light-middleweight	1 x silver
Ray Gilbody	54 kg bantamweight	1 x bronze
Peter Hanlon	57 kg featherweight	1 x silver
Harold Hylton	91 kg heavyweight	1 x silver
John Lyon	48 kg light-flyweight	1 x silver
Jim McDonnell	60 kg lightweight	1 x silver
Clyde McIntosh	63.5 kg light-welterweight	1 x bronze
Jimmy Price	75 kg middleweight	1 x gold
Chris Pyatt	67 kg welterweight	1 x gold

== Cycling ==
Name	Event/s	Medal/s
Mark Barry	match sprint, time trial	
Mark Bell	road race	
Paul Curran	scratch race, team pursuit	1 x bronze
Bob Downs	team time trial	1 x gold
Malcolm Elliott	road race, team time trial	2 x gold
Steve Lawrence	road race, team time trial	1 x gold
Tony Mayer	pursuit, team pursuit	1 x bronze
Gary Sadler	time trial, team pursuit	1 x bronze
Terrence Tinsley	scratch race, match sprint, time trial	1 x bronze
Shaun Wallace	scratch race, pursuit, team pursuit	1 x silver, 1 x bronze
Joseph Waugh	team time trial	1 x gold
Darryl Webster	pursuit, team pursuit	1 x bronze
Jeff Williams	road race	

== Diving ==
Name	Event/s	Medal/s
Lindsey Fraser	10m platform	
Nigel Stanton	3m springboard & 10m platform	
Chris Snode	3m springboard & 10m platform	2 x gold
Sandra Yeates	3m springboard	

== Shooting ==
Name	Event/s	Medal/s
John Bloomfield	fullbore rifle & pair	1 x silver
Peter Boden	clay pigeon trap & pair	1 x gold, 1 x silver
John Cooke	centre fire pistol & pair, rapid fire pistol & pair	1 x gold, 2 x bronze
Malcolm Cooper	10m air rifle & pair, rifle 3 pos & pair, rifle prone & pair	2 x gold, 2 x silver, 1 x bronze
Peter Croft	clay pigeon trap & pair	1 x silver, 1 x bronze
Barry Dagger	10m air rifle & pair, 50m rifle 3 pos pair	1 x gold, 1 x silver
George Darling	10m air pistol & pair, 50m rifle 3 pos	1 x gold, 1 x silver
Chris Godwin	rapid fire pistol & pair	
John Gough	centre fire pistol & pair	1 x bronze
Geoffrey Robinson	10m air pistol & pair, 50m free pistol & pair	2 x silver, 1 x bronze
Dick Rosling	fullbore rifle & pair	1 x silver
Jim Sheffield	skeet & pair	1 x silver
Mike Sullivan	50m rifle prone & pair	1 x gold
Wally Sykes	skeet & pair	1 x silver, 1 x bronze
Frank Wyatt	50m free pistol & pair	1 x bronze

== Swimming ==
Name	Event/s	Medal/s
Andrew Astbury	200/400/1500 freestyle, relay	2 x gold, 1 x silver, 1 x bronze
Sandra Bowman	100/200 breaststroke	
Suki Brownsdon	100/200 breaststroke, relay	1 x silver, 1 x bronze
David Bryant	100/200 breaststroke	
Richard Burrell	100 freestyle, relay	1 x silver
Ian Collins	200/400 medley	
Linda Criddle	100/200 butterfly	
June Croft	100/200/400 freestyle, relays	3 x gold, 1 x silver, 1 x bronze
John Davey	400 freestyle, 200/400 medley, relay	1 x silver, 2 x bronze
Nicola Fibbens	100 freestyle, relay	1 x gold
Debra Gore	100 freestyle, relay	1 x gold
Sarah Hardcastle	800 freestyle, 400 medley	
Stephen Harrison	200 backstroke, relay	1 x silver
Nick Hodgson	200 butterfly	
Philip Hubble	200 freestyle, 100/200 butterfly, relays	1 x gold, 4 x silver
Andrew Jameson	100/200 Backstroke	
Helen Jameson	100/200 backstroke	
Sarah Kerswell	400 freestyle, 200/400 medley	
Kevin Lee	100 butterfly	
David Lowe	100 freestyle, 100 butterfly, relays	2 x silver
Adrian Moorhouse	100/200 breaststroke, relay	1 x gold, 1 x silver, 1 x bronze
Peter Musgrave	100/200 breaststroke	
Philip Osborn	100/200 freestyle, relays	2 x silver
Ann Osgerby	100/200 butterfly, relay	1 x silver, 1 x bronze
Steve Poulter	200 butterfly, 400 medley	1 x silver
Freda Ross	100/200 butterfly	
Joanne Seymour	100 breaststroke, 200 medley	
David Stacey	400/1500 freestyle	
Gaynor Stanley	200 breaststroke	
Louise Tate	200/400 medley	
Catherine White	100/200 backstroke, relay	1 x silver
Jacquelene Willmott	400/800 freestyle, relay	1 x gold, 1 x silver, 1 x bronze

== Weightlifting ==
Name	Event/s	Medal/s
Newton Burrowes	82.5 kg light-heavyweight	1 x gold
Leo Isaac	75 kg middleweight	
Michael Keelan	82.5 kg light-heavyweight	
Gary Langford	100 kg sub-heavyweight	1 x silver
Geoff Laws	56 kg bantamweight	1 x silver
Peter Pinsent	90 kg middle-heavyweight	1 x silver
Steve Pinsent	75 kg middleweight	1 x gold
Dean Willey	60 kg featherweight	1 x gold
Alan Winterbourne	67.5 kg lightweight	

== Wrestling ==
Name	Event/s	Medal/s
Brian Aspen	57 kg bantamweight	1 x gold
Mark Dunbar	62 kg featherweight	
Joey Gilligan	68 kg lightweight	
Stef Kurpas	82 kg middleweight	
Keith Peache	100 kg heavyweight	
Fitzloyd Walker	74 kg welterweight	
