= Shooting at the 1966 British Empire and Commonwealth Games =

- Venue: Twickenham Park Range
- Location: Spanish Town, Jamaica
- Dates: 4 to 13 August 1966

Shooting at the 1966 British Empire and Commonwealth Games was the first appearance of Shooting at the Commonwealth Games. The events were held at the Twickenham Park Range in Spanish Town and featured contests in five disciplines.

Canada topped the medal table again by virtue of winning two bronze medals more than England, after both had tied with two gold medals and one silver medal.

== Medal table ==
* Host nation (Jamaica)

Medals won by nation with totals, ranked by number of golds—sortable
Rank	Nation	Gold	Silver	Bronze	Total
1	Canada	2	1	2	5
2	England	2	1	0	3
3	Wales	1	0	0	1
4	Australia	0	1	1	2
4	New Zealand	0	1	1	2
6	Papua New Guinea (PNG)	0	1	0	1
7	Jamaica*	0	0	1	1
Totals (7 entries)		5	5	5	15

== Medallists ==
Games	Gold	Silver	Bronze
50m Free pistol	(England) Charles Sexton	(Canada) Jules Sobrian	(Canada) Garfield McMahon
25m Centre-Fire pistol	(Canada) James Lee	(England) Tony Clark	(Jamaica) Julio Machado
25m Rapid-Fire pistol	(England) Tony Clark	(Australia) Michael Papps	(Canada) Jules Sobrian
50m Rifle prone	(Canada) Gil Boa	(New Zealand) Brian Lacey	(Australia) John Murphy
Full Bore rifle	(Wales) Lord Swansea	(Papua New Guinea) Robert Stewart	(New Zealand) Tom Sutherland

== Results ==
=== 50m Free pistol (top 10) ===
Pos	Athlete	Pts
1	(England) Charles Sexton	544
2	(Canada) Jules Sobrian	538
3	(Canada) Garfield McMahon	536
4	(England) Anthony Chivers	534
5	(Jamaica) Julio Machado	522
6	(Northern Ireland) Ken Stanford	519
7	(Trinidad and Tobago) Bertram Manhin	517
8	(Scotland) Ronald Ramsay	513
9	(Australia) Michael Papps	511
10	(Australia) James Kirkwood	494

=== 25m Centre-Fire pistol (top 10) ===
Pos	Athlete	Pts
1	(Canada) James Lee	576
2	(England) Tony Clark	575
3	(Jamaica) Julio Machado	571
4	(England) Brian Girling	570
5	(Canada) Garfield McMahon	569
6	(Wales) Robert Hassall	564
7	(Kenya) Len J. Bull	564
8	(Australia) Michael Papps	562
9	(Jamaica) Gilbert A. Shaw	562
10	(Northern Ireland) Ernie Neely	561

=== 25m Rapid-Fire pistol (top 10) ===
Pos	Athlete	Pts
1	(England) Tony Clark	585
2	(Australia) Michael Papps	578
3	(Canada) Jules Sobrian	572
4	(Wales) Robert Hassall	568
5	(England) Brian Girling	563
6	(Kenya) Allan Handford-Rice	558
7	(Northern Ireland) Ken Stanford	555
8	(Kenya) Len J. Bull	553
9	(Pakistan) N.H. Iqbal	551
10	(Canada) Arthur H. Lord	550

=== 50m Rifle prone (top 10) ===
Pos	Athlete	Pts
1	(Canada) Gil Boa	587
2	(New Zealand) Brian Lacey	585
3	(Australia) John Murphy	584
4	(Wales) Thomas Dunn	583
5	(England) Peter Morgan	582
6	(New Zealand) Donald D. Wild	582
7	(Papua New Guinea) Roland McDonald	581
8	(Canada) George Marsh	581
9	(England) Frank Pacey	580
10	(British Honduras) James A. Waight	579

=== Full Bore rifle (top 10) ===
Pos	Athlete	Pts
1	(Wales) Lord Swansea	394
2	(Papua New Guinea) Robert Stewart	381
3	(New Zealand) Tom Sutherland	381
4	(Trinidad and Tobago) Eustace Chan	379
5	(Jamaica) Keith De Casseres	379
6	(New Zealand) Maurie Gordon	378
7	(Papua New Guinea) Kenneth Lee	377
8	(England) Francis Little	377
9	(Scotland) William H. Crawford	375
10	(Barbados) Milton Tucker	374
