= Michael Sullivan (sport shooter) =

British sport shooter (born 1942)

Mike Sullivan
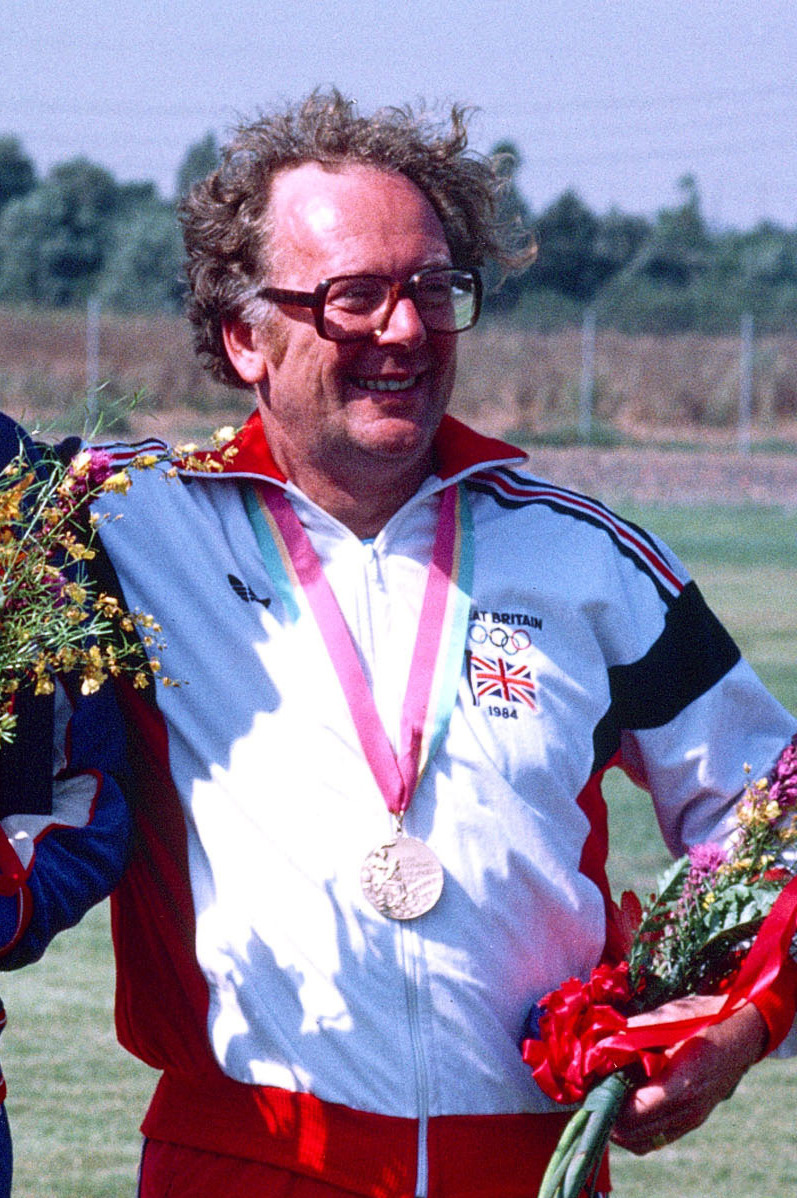

Personal information
- Born: 6 December 1942 (age 83) Exeter, Devon

Sport
- Sport: Sports shooting
- Club: Barclays Bank Rifle Club
Medal record
Men's shooting
Representing Great Britain
Bronze medal – third place	1984 Los Angeles	50m rifle prone
Representing England
Commonwealth Games
Gold medal – first place	1982 Brisbane	50m rifle prone pair

Michael J Sullivan (born 6 December 1942) is a British former sport shooter.

== Sport shooting career ==
Sullivan competed in the 1984 Summer Olympics. He received the bronze medal in that event, with 596 points.

He represented England and won a gold medal in the 50 metres rifle prone pair with Malcolm Cooper, at the 1982 Commonwealth Games in Brisbane, Queensland, Australia.
