= Francis Little (sport shooter) =

British sports shooter

Personal information
- Nationality: British (English)
- Born: 17 November 1907 Westbury-on-Severn, England
- Died: 16 February 1992 (aged 84) Taunton, England

Sport
- Sport: Sports shooting
- Event: Fullbore rifle

Francis Geoffrey Little (17 November 1907 – 16 February 1992) was an international sports shooter who competed at the Commonwealth Games.

== Biography ==
Little, born in 1907 in Westbury-on-Severn, lived in May Lawn, Mitcheldean, Gloucestershire and was elected Alderman of the Gloucestershire County Council in January 1962.

Little represented the England team at the 1966 British Empire and Commonwealth Games in Kingston, Jamaica. He competed in the fullbore rifle Queens prize event, where he qualified for the final.

In 1969, he won the prestigious Queen's Prize at the National Shooting Centre at Bisley, having previously made the final five times. The following year he was selected by Great Britain for their tour of Canada.

Little was also a company owner, vice-chairman of Gloucestershire County Cricket Club and a magistrate. He died in 1992.
