= Geoffrey Robinson (sport shooter) =

British sports shooter (born 1947)

Personal information
- Born: 15 October 1947 (age 78) Sheffield, West Riding of Yorkshire, England

Sport
- Sport: Sports shooting
- Club: Kensington Pistol Club
Medal record
Representing Great Britain
World Championships
Gold medal – first place	1979 Seoul	10m air pistol
Representing England
Commonwealth Games
Silver medal – second place	1982 Brisbane	10m air pistol pair
Silver medal – second place	1982 Brisbane	50m free pistol
Bronze medal – third place	1982 Brisbane	50m free pistol pair

Geoffrey Robinson (born 1947) is a British former sports shooter.

== Sports shooting career ==
Robinson competed at the 1984 Summer Olympics.

Robinson represented England and won a silver medal in the 10 metres air pistol pair with Frank Wyatt, another silver medal in the 50 metres free pistol and a bronze medal in the 50 metres free pistol pair with George Darling, at the 1982 Commonwealth Games in Brisbane, Queensland, Australia.

In 1979, Robinson represented Great Britain and won the gold medal in the ISSF 10-meter Air Pistol World Championship held in Seoul.
