= Dick Rosling =

British former sports shooter (born 1946)

Personal information
- Born: 1946 (age 79–80) Nottingham, Nottinghamshire

Sport
- Sport: Sports shooting
Medal record
Representing England
Commonwealth Games
| Silver medal – second place | 1982 Brisbane | fullbore rifle |

Richard Rosling (born 1946) is a British former sports shooter.

== Sports shooting career ==
Rosling represented England and won a silver medal in the fullbore rifle Queens Prize (Open) event, at the 1982 Commonwealth Games in Brisbane, Queensland, Australia.
