= David Calvert (sport shooter) =

Northern Irish sports shooter

Personal information
- Nationality: British (Northern Irish)
- Born: 24 March 1951 (age 75) Belfast, Northern Ireland

Sport
- Sport: Sports shooting
- Event: Fullbore rifle
- Club: Comber Rifle Club
Medal record
Representing Northern Ireland
Commonwealth Games
Shooting
Bronze medal – third place	1982 Brisbane	Fullbore rifle pairs
Bronze medal – third place	1986 Edinburgh	Fullbore rifle pairs
Gold medal – first place	1994 Victoria	Fullbore rifle
Bronze medal – third place	1994 Victoria	Fullbore rifle pairs
Gold medal – first place	1998 Kuala Lumpur	Fullbore rifle pairs
Gold medal – first place	2002 Manchester	Fullbore rifle
Gold medal – first place	2002 Manchester	Fullbore rifle pairs
Bronze medal – third place	2010 Delhi	Fullbore rifle

David Peter Calvert (born 24 March 1951) is a former sports shooter from Northern Ireland, who competed at eleven Commonwealth Games and holds the record for Northern Ireland's most Commonwealth Games appearances from 1978 to 2018, winning eight medals.

== Biography ==
Calvert built a miniature rifle range in his Belfast home attic. He was educated at Campbell College, where he began full bore target rifle shooting in 1965. He left Belfast in 1969 to go to Southampton for flying training and became a pilot in the Royal Air Force.

He represented Ireland and the RAF before being named in the Great Britain team in 1975. He represented Northern Ireland at the 1974 British Commonwealth Games, just missing out on a medal after a fourth-place finish in the Full bore rifle Queens Prize Pair.

Four years later at the 1982 Commonwealth Games in Brisbane, Australia, he won a bronze medal in the fullbore fifle pairs, with Hazel Mackintosh. This was followed by further medal successes at the 1986 Commonwealth Games (bronze with Martin Millar), a gold and bronze at the 1994 Commonwealth Games, a gold with Millar at the 1998 Commonwealth Games, double gold at the 2002 Manchester Games and finally a bronze at the 2010 Delhi.

Calvert was a member of the Comber Rifle Club and with Martin Millar, opened their new club house in 2003.

In 2018, he became Northern Ireland's most decorated Commonwealth Games athlete.

In 2019, at the age of 68, he was once again named in the British team for the World Championships.
