= Jean-François Sénécal =

Canadian sports shooter (born 1961)

Personal information
- Born: 29 June 1961 (age 64) Laval, Quebec, Canada

Sport
- Sport: Sports shooting
Medal record
Representing Canada
Commonwealth Games
Gold medal – first place	1982 Brisbane	10m air rifle
Gold medal – first place	1990 Auckland	50m rifle 3 positions pairs
Gold medal – first place	1994 Victoria	10m air rifle pairs
Silver medal – second place	1982 Brisbane	50m rifle 3 positions pairs
Silver medal – second place	1986 Edinburgh	50m rifle 3 positions pairs
Silver medal – second place	1994 Victoria	10m air rifle
Bronze medal – third place	1986 Edinburgh	50m rifle 3 positions
Pan American Games
Gold medal – first place	1987 Indianapolis	50m rifle prone team
Gold medal – first place	1987 Indianapolis	10m air rifle team
Silver medal – second place	1983 Caracas	50m rifle 3 positions team
Silver medal – second place	1983 Caracas	50m rifle prone team
Silver medal – second place	1983 Caracas	10m air rifle team
Silver medal – second place	1987 Indianapolis	50m rifle prone
Silver medal – second place	1987 Indianapolis	50m rifle 3 positions team
Silver medal – second place	1995 Mar del Plata	10m air rifle
Silver medal – second place	1995 Mar del Plata	10m air rifle team
Bronze medal – third place	1983 Caracas	50m rifle 3 positions team

Jean-François Sénécal (born 29 June 1961) is a Canadian sports shooter. He competed at the 1984, 1988, 1992 and the 1996 Summer Olympics.
