= Ian Reid (sport shooter) =

British sport shooter

Sport
- Sport: Sports shooting
Medal record
Representing England
Commonwealth Games
Gold medal – first place	1986 Edinburgh	10m air pistol pairs

Ian Reid is a British former sports shooter.

== Sports shooting career ==
Reid represented England and won a gold medal in the 10 metres air pistol pairs with Paul Leatherdale, at the 1986 Commonwealth Games in Edinburgh, Scotland.
