= Alister Allan =

British sport shooter

Alister Allan MBE
Personal information
- Nickname: Jock
- Born: Alister Millar Allan; 28 January 1944 (age 82) Freuchie, Fife, Scotland

Sport
- Country: Great Britain; Scotland
- Sport: Sports shooting
Medal record
Men's shooting
Representing Great Britain
Olympic Games
Silver medal – second place	1988 Seoul	50 m Rifle Three Positions
Bronze medal – third place	1984 Los Angeles	50 m Rifle Three Positions
Representing Scotland
Commonwealth Games
Gold medal – first place	1978 Edmonton	50m Rifle Prone
Gold medal – first place	1982 Brisbane	10m Air Rifle Pairs
Gold medal – first place	1982 Brisbane	50m Rifle Three Positions
Silver medal – second place	1986 Edinburgh	50m Rifle Three Positions
Silver medal – second place	1986 Edinburgh	50m Rifle Prone
Silver medal – second place	1994 Victoria	50m Rifle Three Positions Pairs
Bronze medal – third place	1974 Christchurch	50m Rifle Prone
Bronze medal – third place	1982 Brisbane	50m Rifle Three Positions Pairs
Bronze medal – third place	1986 Edinburgh	Smallbore 50m Rifle Three Positions Pairs
Bronze medal – third place	1994 Victoria	50m Rifle Three Positions

Alister Millar "Jock" Allan, MBE (born 28 January 1944) is an Olympic medal-winning Scottish rifleman who represented Great Britain at five Olympics between 1968 and 1992 (1972 and 1980 excepted), placing in the top-10 all five times.

His best Olympic performance was at the 50m Rifle Three Positions when he set an Olympic record during qualifying and came second to countryman (and defending champion) Malcolm Cooper in the final. Allan also became World Champion in 1978 and set a prone rifle world record in 1982.

== Biography ==
Allan represented the 1974 Scottish team at the 1974 British Commonwealth Games in Christchurch, New Zealand, where he competed in the shooting events. He won a bronze medal in the 50 metres rifle prone.

He represented Scotland at the Commonwealth Games again in 1978, where he won a gold medal in the 50m Rifle Prone event; in 1982 where he won gold medals in the 10m Air Rifle Pairs and 50m Rifle Three Positions events and a bronze medal in the 50m Rifle Three Positions Pairs event; in 1986 where he won silver medals in the 50m Rifle Three Positions and 50m Rifle Prone events and a bronze medal in the Smallbore 50m Rifle Three Positions Pairs event; and in 1994 where he won a silver medal in the 50m Rifle Three Positions Pairs event and a bronze medal in the 50m Rifle Three Positions event.

He was made MBE in 1989 and inducted into the Scottish Sports Hall of Fame in 2002.

== See also ==
- Barry Dagger
- Malcolm Cooper
