= Laszlo Antal (sport shooter) =

British sport shooter (1936–2010)

Laslo Antal
Personal information
- Full name: Laslo Charles Antal
- Nationality: Hungarian then British citizen
- Born: Laszlo Károly Antal; 10 April 1936 Pécs, Baranya, Hungary
- Died: 30 March 2010 (aged 73) Liverpool, England

Sport
- Sport: Sports shooting
- Club: Mossley Hill Rifle & Pistol Club
Medal record
Sports shooting
Representing England
Commonwealth Games
Bronze medal – third place	1974 Christchurch	50m free pistol

Laszlo Antal (1936–2010) was a Hungarian born sports shooter who competed for Great Britain and England.

== Shooting career ==
Antal represented Great Britain in the 1976 Summer Olympics. He represented England and won a bronze medal in the 50 metres free pistol, at the 1974 British Commonwealth Games in Christchurch, New Zealand.
