= Sarah Cooper (sport shooter) =

British sports shooter (born 1949)

Sarah Cooper née Robinson
Personal information
- Born: 23 March 1949 (age 77) Kettering, Northamptonshire, England

Sport
- Sport: Sports shooting
- Club: Havant Rifle and Pistol Club
Medal record
Representing United Kingdom
European Championships
Gold medal – first place	1980 Oslo	10m Air Rifle
Silver medal – second place	1981 Titograd	50m Rifle prone
Representing England
Commonwealth Games
Gold medal – first place	1986 Edinburgh	50m Rifle 3 Pos pair

Sarah Jane Cooper née Sarah Robinson (born 1949) is a British former sports shooter.

She was a co-founder of Accuracy International with her husband Malcolm Cooper, and Martin Kay, Dave Walls, and David Caig.

== Sports shooting career ==
Cooper competed in the 1984 Summer Olympics and 1988 Summer Olympics.

She represented England and won a gold medal in the 50 metres Rifle three position pair with her husband Malcolm Cooper, at the 1986 Commonwealth Games in Edinburgh, Scotland.

== Personal life ==
She married Malcolm Cooper in 1974.
