= Brian Bailey (sport shooter) =

British sport shooter (1932–2022)

Brian Walford Bailey
Personal information
- Nationality: British
- Born: 20 August 1932 Edstaston, Shropshire, England
- Died: 16 July 2022 (aged 89) Wem, Shropshire, England

Sport
- Country: England
- Sport: Sports shooting
Medal record
Sports shooting
Representing England
Commonwealth Games
| Silver medal – second place | 1974 Christchurch | clay pigeon trap |

Brian Walford Bailey (20 August 1932 – 16 July 2022) was a British sports shooter.

== Shooting career ==
He competed in the trap event at the 1972 Summer Olympics. He represented England and won a silver medal in the clay pigeon trap, at the 1974 British Commonwealth Games in Christchurch, New Zealand.

== Personal life ==
Bailey, born at Edstaston, Shropshire, moved to nearby Wem at age four. He joined and worked in a family haulage and coal merchants business in the town, which in later life made him an Honorary Townsman. Bailey Close in the town is named for him.
