= John Bloomfield (sport shooter) =

English sports shooter (born 1956)

Personal information
- Born: September 1956 (age 69) Essex, England

Sport
- Sport: Sport shooting
- Event: Rifle
Medal record
Representing England
Commonwealth Games
Shooting
| Silver medal – second place | 1982 Brisbane | Fullbore Rifle |
| Bronze medal – third place | 1986 Edinburgh | Fullbore Rifle |

John Paul Spencer Bloomfield (born September 1956) is an English sport shooter, specialising in Full-Bore Rifle.

== Sport shooting career ==
Bloomfield represented England and won a silver medal in the fullbore rifle Queens Prize (open), at the 1982 Commonwealth Games in Brisbane, Queensland, Australia. Four years later he represented England and won a bronze medal in the fullbore rifle Queens Prize (open), at the 1986 Commonwealth Games in Edinburgh, Scotland.

He won H.M. The Queen's Prize at Bisley twice, in 1985 and 1990 and H.E. The Governor General's Prize in Canada in 1978.
