= Paul Bentley (sport shooter) =

British sports shooter (born 1946)

Personal information
- Born: 7 February 1946 (age 80) Bradford-on-Avon, Wiltshire, England

Sport
- Sport: Sports shooting
- Club: Clay Pigeon Shooting Association
Medal record
Sports shooting
Representing England
Commonwealth Games
Silver medal – second place	1978 Edmonton	skeet

Paul Anthony Bentley (born 1946) is a retired sports shooter who competed for Great Britain and England.

== Shooting career ==
Bentley represented Great Britain in the 1984 Summer Olympics. He represented England and won a silver medal in the skeet, at the 1978 Commonwealth Games in Edmonton, Alberta, Canada.
