= Keith Affleck =

Australian sport shooter

Personal information
- Nationality: Australian
- Born: Keith William Affleck

Sport
- Country: Australia
- Sport: Sport shooting
- Event: Full Bore Target Rifle
Medal record
Representing Australia
Commonwealth Games
Shooting
| Gold medal – first place | 1982 Brisbane | Fullbore Rifle Queens Prize (Pair) - Open |

Keith William Affleck is an Australian sport shooter, specialising in Fullbore Target Rifle Shooting.

He has competed in the Commonwealth Games, representing Australia at the Belmont Rifle Range in 1982. He won a gold medal in the Fullbore Pairs match with Shooter Geoffrey Ayling winning a gold medal.
