= Bob Northover =

British sports shooter

Sport
- Sport: Sports shooting
Medal record
Representing England
Commonwealth Games
Gold medal – first place	1986 Edinburgh	centre fire pistol
Silver medal – second place	1986 Edinburgh	centre fire pistol pairs

Bob Northover is a British former sports shooter.

== Sports shooting career ==
Northover represented England and won a gold medal in the centre fire pistol and a silver medal in the centre fire pistol pairs with Michael Cutler, at the 1986 Commonwealth Games in Edinburgh, Scotland.
