= John Murphy (sport shooter) =

Australian sports shooter

Personal information
- Born: 10 April 1919 Adelaide, Australia
- Died: 29 July 1997 (aged 78) Adelaide, Australia

Sport
- Sport: Sports shooting
Medal record
Shooting
Representing Australia
British Empire & Commonwealth Games
Bronze medal – third place	1966 Kingston	Men's Small Bore Rifle

John Bernard Murphy (10 April 1919 – 29 July 1997) was an Australian sports shooter. He competed in the 50 metre rifle, three positions event at the 1964 Summer Olympics.
