= John Woolley (sport shooter) =

New Zealand sport shooter (born 1950)

Personal information
- Full name: Lawrence John Woolley
- Born: 23 August 1950 (age 75) Melton Mowbray, Leicestershire, England
- Height: 190 cm (6 ft 3 in)
- Weight: 80 kg (176 lb)

Sport
- Sport: Sports shooting
Medal record
Sports shooting
Representing New Zealand
Commonwealth Games
Gold medal – first place	1978 Edmonton	Open skeet
Gold medal – first place	1982 Brisbane	Open skeet
Bronze medal – third place	1986 Edinburgh	Open skeet pairs
Bronze medal – third place	1990 Auckland	Open skeet pairs

Lawrence John Woolley (born 23 August 1950 in Melton Mowbray), known as John Woolley, is a sport shooter from New Zealand who has represented New Zealand at three Olympic Games and four Commonwealth Games.
