= James Spaight (sport shooter) =

British sports shooter

Personal information
- Born: 1936 Kings Lynn, Norfolk
- Died: 6 April 2011 (aged 74–75)

Sport
- Sport: Sports shooting
Medal record
Sports shooting
Representing England
Commonwealth Games
Bronze medal – third place	1974 Christchurch	fullbore rifle
Silver medal – second place	1978 Edmonton	fullbore rifle pairs

James Seymour Spaight (1936-2011) was a British sports shooter.

== Shooting career ==
Spaight represented England and won a bronze medal in the fullbore rifle Queens Prize, at the 1974 British Commonwealth Games in Christchurch, New Zealand. Four years later he represented England and won a silver medal in the fullbore rifle Queens Prize, at the 1978 Commonwealth Games in Edmonton, Alberta, Canada.

He won over 20 individual major Bisley trophies.
