= Lindsey Fraser =

British diver

Personal information
- Nationality: England
- Born: 24 January 1958 (age 67); Woolwich, Greater London

Lindsey Ann Fraser (born 24 January 1958) is a female former diver who competed for Great Britain and England.

== Diving career ==
Fraser represented Great Britain at the 1980 Summer Olympics and the 1984 Summer Olympics.

She also represented England in the 10 metres platform, at the 1982 Commonwealth Games in Brisbane, Queensland, Australia.

Fraser was awarded an Honorary Doctorate of Sport by the University of Chichester in 2023.
