= Eileen Robinson =

British archer (born 1951)

Personal information
- Nationality: English
- Born: 6 March 1951 (age 74); Manchester, England

Sport
- Club: Greater Manchester Police

Eileen Robinson (born 6 March 1951) is a retired archer who competed for Great Britain and England.

== Archery career ==
Robinson represented Great Britain in the 1984 Summer Olympics. She represented England in the women's individual event, at the 1982 Commonwealth Games in Brisbane, Queensland, Australia.
