= George Darling (sport shooter) =

British sports shooter (born 1950)

Personal information
- Born: 1950 (age 75–76) Norwich, Norfolk

Sport
- Sport: Sports shooting
Medal record
Representing England
Commonwealth Games
Gold medal – first place	1982 Brisbane	10m air pistol
Silver medal – second place	1982 Brisbane	10m air pistol pair

George Darling (born 1950) is a British former sports shooter.

== Sports shooting career ==
Darling represented England and won a gold medal in the 10 metres air pistol and a silver medal in the 10 metres air pistol pair with Geoffrey Robinson, at the 1982 Commonwealth Games in Brisbane, Queensland, Australia.
