= Joe Neville (sport shooter) =

British sports shooter (born 1944)

Joe Neville MBE
Personal information
- Full name: Joseph Martin Neville
- Born: 6 January 1944 (age 82) Tansley, Derbyshire, England

Sport
- Sport: Sports shooting
Medal record
Sports shooting
Representing England
Commonwealth Games
| Silver medal – second place | 1974 Christchurch | skeet |
| Bronze medal – third place | 1978 Edmonton | skeet |
| Gold medal – first place | 1986 Edinburgh | skeet pair |
| Silver medal – second place | 1986 Edinburgh | skeet |

Joseph Martin Neville MBE (born 6 January 1944) is a British former sports shooter.

== Shooting career ==
Neville competed at the 1972 Summer Olympics and the 1976 Summer Olympics. He represented England and won a silver medal in the skeet event, at the 1974 British Commonwealth Games in Christchurch, New Zealand. Four years later he represented England and won a bronze medal in the skeet, at the 1978 Commonwealth Games in Edmonton, Alberta, Canada. A third Commonwealth Games appearance for England resulted in the 1986 Commonwealth Games in Edinburgh, Scotland and it was his most successful because he won a gold medal in the skeet pair with Ken Harman and a bronze medal in the individual skeet.
