= Charles Sexton (sport shooter) =

British sport shooter

Personal information
- Nationality: British (English)
- Born: 15 September 1906 Lexden, Essex, England
- Died: 23 June 1994 (aged 87) Boston, Lincolnshire, England
- Height: 173 cm (5 ft 8 in)
- Weight: 70 kg (154 lb)

Sport
- Sport: Sports shooting
- Event: 50 metres free pistol
Medal record
Shooting
Representing England
British Empire & Commonwealth Games
Gold medal – first place	1966 Kingston	50m free pistol

Charles Henry Sexton (15 September 1906 – 23 June 1994) was a British international sports shooter who competed at the 1968 Summer Olympics.

== Biography ==
At the 1968 Olympic Games in Mexico City, he participated in the 50 metre free pistol event.

He represented England and won a gold medal in the 50 metres free pistol, at the 1966 British Empire and Commonwealth Games in Kingston, Jamaica.
