= Wally Sykes (sport shooter) =

British sports shooter (1942–2026)

Personal information
- Born: 25 October 1942 Wyverstone, Suffolk, England
- Died: 5 August 2026 (aged 83) Bury St Edmunds, Suffolk, England

Sport
- Sport: Sports shooting
- Club: Clay Pigeon Shooting Association
Medal record
Representing England
Commonwealth Games
Silver medal – second place	1982 Brisbane	skeet pair
Bronze medal – third place	1982 Brisbane	skeet

Wallace John Sykes (25 October 1942 – 5 August 2026) was a British sports shooter.

He was born on the family farm in Wyverstone, Suffolk.

Sykes competed at the 1984 Summer Olympics.

He represented England and won a silver medal in the skeet pair with Jim Sheffield and a bronze medal in the skeet, at the 1982 Commonwealth Games in Brisbane, Queensland, Australia.

He retired from competitive shooting, after the 1984 Olympics; he was a farmer and agricultural engineer.

Sykes died on 5 August 2026. He was 83.
