= Jim Sheffield =

British sports shooter (born 1947)

Personal information
- Born: 1947 (age 78–79)

Sport
- Sport: Sports shooting
Medal record
Representing England
Commonwealth Games
Silver medal – second place	1982 Brisbane	skeet pair

James H. Sheffield (born 1947) is a British former sports shooter.

Sheffield represented England and won a silver medal in the skeet pair with Wally Sykes, at the 1982 Commonwealth Games in Brisbane, Queensland, Australia.
