= John Gough (sport shooter) =

English sport shooter (1929–2023)

Personal information
- Full name: John McKinley Gough
- Born: 25 September 1929 Kensington, London, England
- Died: 26 July 2023 (aged 93) Bromsgrove, Worcestershire, England
- Height: 170 cm (5 ft 7 in)
- Weight: 84 kg (185 lb)

Sport
- Sport: Sports shooting
Medal record
Sports shooting
Representing England
Commonwealth Games
| Bronze medal – third place | 1982 Brisbane | centre fire pistol pair |

John McKinley Gough (25 September 1929 – 26 July 2023) was a British sports shooter.

== Sport shooting career ==
Gough competed at the 1976 Summer Olympics. He represented England and won a bronze medal in the centre fire pistol pair with John Cooke, at the 1982 Commonwealth Games in Brisbane, Queensland, Australia.

== Death ==
John McKinley Gough died in Bromsgrove, Worcestershire on 26 July 2023, at the age of 93.
