= Frank Pacey =

British sports shooter

Personal information
- Nationality: British (English)
- Born: 10 January 1926 Essex, England
- Died: November 2007 (aged 81)

Sport
- Sport: Sports shooting
- Event: 50m rifle prone
- Club: Holland-on-Sea Rifle Club; Colchester Rifle Club

Frank Pacey (10 January 1926 – November 2007) was a British international sports shooter who competed at the Commonwealth Games.

== Biography ==
Pacey was one of the United Kingdom's leading sports shooters during the 1960s. He joined the Holland-on-Sea Rifle Club and the Colchester Rifle Club in 1962 and achieved ‘fame’ when scoring a perfect 1000 points to reach the final of the British Short-range Championship for the News of the World trophy. His form during the early 1960s led to his selection to shoot for Great Britain and later England in the Commonwealth Games. He shot for Great Britain in 1964, 1965 and 1969 and competed for Britain in the European Championships in Wiesbaden.

He represented England in the 50 metres rifle prone event, at the 1966 British Empire and Commonwealth Games in Kingston, Jamaica.

He was a railway worker by trade and was considered to be one of the foremost authorities on signalling; he retired in 1992.
