= Michael Cutler =

British sports shooter

Sport
- Sport: Sports shooting
Medal record
Representing England
Commonwealth Games
Silver medal – second place	1986 Edinburgh	centre fire pistol pairs

Michael Cutler is a British former sports shooter.

== Sports shooting career ==
Cutler represented England and won a silver medal in the centre fire pistol pairs with Bob Northover, at the 1986 Commonwealth Games in Edinburgh, Scotland.
