= Richard Wang (athlete) =

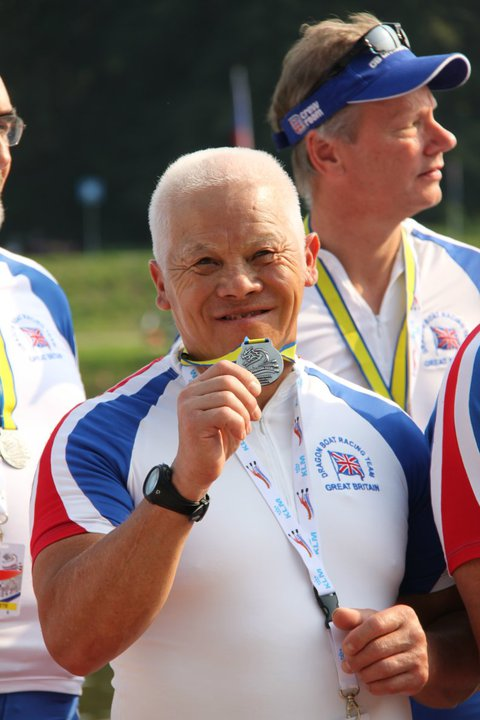
- Richard Wang at the 2010 European Championships in Amsterdam

Personal information
- Born: 1947 (age 78–79) Hong Kong

Sport
- Sport: Sports shooting
Medal record
Representing England
Commonwealth Games
Bronze medal – third place	1986 Edinburgh	50m free pistol pairs

Richard Wang is a Hong Kong born athlete who has competed for Great Britain and England in sports shooting and Dragon Boat Racing.

== Sports shooting ==
Wang represented England and won a silver medal in the 50 metres free pistol pairs with Paul Leatherdale, at the 1986 Commonwealth Games in Edinburgh, Scotland.

== Dragon Boat racing ==
- Team GB: Bronze medallist in the Senior 1000m at the 2009 IDBF Dragon Boat Racing World Championships in Prague, Czech Republic.
- Team GB: Bronze medallist in the Grand Dragons 500m at the 2010 EDBF Dragon Boat Racing European Championships in Amsterdam, Netherlands.

Richard is currently still involved in Dragon Boat Racing and trains with the Typhoon Dragon Boat Club.
