= Michael Papps (sport shooter) =

Australian sports shooter (1932–2022)

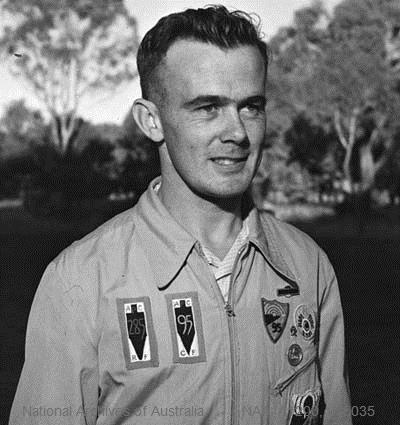

Personal information
- Born: 20 July 1932 Adelaide, Australia
- Died: 5 October 2022 (aged 90)

Sport
- Country: Australia
- Sport: Sports shooting
Medal record
Shooting
Representing Australia
British Empire & Commonwealth Games
Silver medal – second place	1966 Kingston	rapid fire pistol

Michael Papps (20 July 1932 – 5 October 2022) was an Australian sports shooter who competed at the 1960 Summer Olympics and the 1964 Summer Olympics.
