= Peter Morgan (sport shooter) =

British sports shooter

Personal information
- Nationality: British (English)
- Born: 2 September 1927
- Died: 27 July 2009 (aged 81)
- Height: 173 cm (5 ft 8 in)
- Weight: 67 kg (148 lb)

Sport
- Sport: Sports shooting
- Club: Addiscombe Rifle Club, Croydon

Thomas "Peter" Morgan (2 September 1927 – 27 July 2009) was a British international sports shooter who competed at the 1964 Summer Olympics.

== Biography ==
At the 1964 Olympic Games in Tokyo, Morgan competed in the 50 metre rifle, prone event.

Morgan represented the England team at the 1966 British Empire and Commonwealth Games in Kingston, Jamaica. He competed in the 50 metres rifle prone event.
