= Kathryn Warren =

English heptathlete

Personal information
- Nationality: English

Sport
- Sport: Athletics
- Club: Derby

Kathryn Warren is a female former athlete who competed for England.

== Athletics career ==
Warren became the 1981 National champion after winning the AAA National Championships in the heptathlon. She represented England in the heptathlon, at the 1982 Commonwealth Games in Brisbane, Queensland, Australia.
