= Paul Leatherdale =

British sports shooter

Personal information
- Born: 21 September 1958 (age 67) Ely, Cambridgeshire, England

Sport
- Sport: Sports shooting
- Club: Marylebone Rifle & Pistol Club
Medal record
Representing England
Commonwealth Games
Gold medal – first place	1986 Edinburgh	10m air pistol pair
Silver medal – second place	1986 Edinburgh	50m free pistol pair
Bronze medal – third place	1994 Victoria	50m free pistol pair

Paul Henry Francis Leatherdale (born 1958) is a British former sports shooter and Olympian. He won three medals representing England at the Commonwealth Games and held British records in the Free Pistol event.

== Sports shooting career ==
Leatherdale competed in the 1988 Summer Olympics.

He represented England at the 1986 Commonwealth Games in Edinburgh, winning a gold medal in the 10 metre air pistol pairs with Ian Reid and a silver medal in the 50 metre free pistol pairs with Richard Wang. Four years later he represented England in the 10 metres air pistol and 50 metres free pistol events, at the 1990 Commonwealth Games in Auckland, New Zealand.

In 1993, he set the British record for Free Pistol of 572 ex600.

A third Games appearance and third medal arrived at the 1994 Commonwealth Games when he competed in the 50 metres free pistol events and won the pairs with Mick Gault.
