= Peter Gillam =

British archer (born 1956)

Personal information
- Nationality: English
- Born: 2 January 1956 (age 69); Folkestone, Kent, England

Sport
- Club: Stafford Archers

Peter J Gillam (born 1956), is a male retired archer who competed for Great Britain and England.

== Archery career ==
Gillam represented Great Britain in the 1984 Summer Olympics. He represented England in the men's individual event, at the 1982 Commonwealth Games in Brisbane, Queensland, Australia.
