= Geoffrey Ayling =

Australian sport shooter

Personal information
- Born: Geoffrey Mervyn Ayling; 9 November 1939 (age 86)

Sport
- Country: Australia
- Sport: Sport shooting
- Event: Rifle
Medal record
Representing Australia
Commonwealth Games
Shooting
Gold medal – first place	1982 Brisbane	Fullbore Rifle Queens Prize (Pair) - Open

Geoffrey Mervyn Ayling AM (born 9 November 1939) is an Australian sport shooter, specialising in the rifle.

He has competed in the Commonwealth Games, representing Australia at Edmonton 1978 and Brisbane 1982, and winning a gold medal.
