= Alain Marion (sport shooter) =

Canadian fullbore shooter (died 2023)

Personal information
- Nationality: Canadian
- Born: 1946
- Died: June 24, 2023 (aged 76) Plaisance, Quebec

Sport
- Country: Canada
- Sport: Sport shooting
- Event: Fullbore target rifle
Medal record
Representing Canada
Shooting
Commonwealth Games
Gold medal – first place	1986 Edinburgh	Fullbore pairs
Silver medal – second place	1998 Kuala Lumpur	Fullbore pairs
Silver medal – second place	1998 Kuala Lumpur	Fullbore Queen's Prize individual
- Updated on September 23, 2023

Alain Marion (1946 – June 24, 2023) was a French Canadian sport shooter. He competed in the discipline of fullbore target rifle (TR), and won three Commonwealth Games medals, including gold in the 1986 fullbore pairs. He set the record score for the Sovereign's Prize twice, and was the second shooter to win it three times.

== Life ==
Marion was born in 1946, the son of Noël Marion and Adèle Létang, and began shooting at the age of twelve. An early mentor was Gerry Ouellette, a gold medallist in the 1956 Olympic Games: Marion later recounted that Ouellette's first response to his request for advice was to hand him a box of 5,000 cartridges, telling him to return when he had fired them all. Ouellette gave Marion a rifle and drove him to his early shooting matches. Marion was first selected to represent Canada at the age of twenty.

Marion was part of the winning Canadian teams in the 1972 and 1982 World Long Range Championships. He was capped three times for Canada in the Commonwealth Games. Along with William "Wilf" Baldwin, he won the gold medal in the fullbore pairs event at the 1986 Games, held in Edinburgh, with a score of 583 out of 600. For the 1998 games, in Kuala Lumpur, technical difficulties forced him to use his second choice of rifle: he and Jim Paton placed second with a score of 298 out of 300. In the same games, Marion placed second in the individual Queen's Prize with a score of 396 out of 400. In 2002, he was a coach for the Canadian shooting team at the Melbourne Commonwealth Games. He won the Dominion of Canada Rifle Association's fullbore championships twelve times, a record as of 2023. He won the Canadian Grand Aggregate ten times, also a record, and the Governor General's Prize five times.

Marion was capped forty-two times in the Canadian team for the Imperial Meeting at Bisley in the United Kingdom, more than any other shooter. At Bisley, he won the Queen's Prize in 1980, 1983 and 1996, placing second in 1972 and third in both 1987 and 1990. His score of 294 out of 300 in 1980 was, at the time, a record; Marion had previously set a record of 293 jointly with the British shooter Dick Rosling in 1972, but lost to Rosling in a tie shoot. Marion won the Grand Aggregate in 1990, having previously placed second in 1973 and 1980. He placed in the top hundred of the Queen's Prize and the top fifty of the Grand Aggregate sixteen times apiece, both a record for a non-British competitor as of 2023. After Arthur Fulton, who won in 1912, 1926 and 1931, he was the second shooter to win the Sovereign's Prize three times: as of 2025, no shooter has surpassed this total. He won over twenty Canadian provincial championships. He also won a bronze medal in the Commonwealth Shooting Federation Championship.

The British National Rifle Association described Marion as "one of the greats in the world of TR". On October 25, 1991, he was awarded membership of the Order of Canada. He worked as a police officer in Hull, Quebec, and was married to Francine Vadnais; he had one daughter. When interviewed in 1998 about the reasons for his shooting success, he said "I just kept doing it and it worked".

== Bibliography ==
- "Alain Marion C.M." Hall of Fame. Dominion of Canada Rifle Association.
- "Alain Marion GM3, GC, SM, SB, SC2". National Rifle Association Journal. E (3): 56. Autumn 2023.
- "Canadian Bull's-Eye!". Sunday Mercury. 27 July 1980. p. 52.
- Cleary, Martin (12 September 1998). "Still on Target". The Ottawa Citizen. p. F4.
- "Commonwealth Games: Thompson Gives Gold Shoulder to the Officials: He Wins Third Straight Decathlon Title, Then Throws Away the Sponsor's Bib". Los Angeles Times. 29 July 1986.
- Groom, Graham (2017). The Complete Book of the Commonwealth Games. Lulu Press.
- "The King's and Queen's Prize". National Rifle Association. Archived from the original on 29 March 2025.
- "Media Guide" (PDF). Commonwealth Sport Canada. 2006.
- "Marion, Alain". Ottawa Citizen. 8 July 2023. p. B10.
- "Mr. Alain Marion". The Governor General of Canada.
- "Queen's Prize Rifle Event: Canadian Marksmen Outgunned". The Windsor Star. 26 July 1971. p. 19.
