= Anthony Chivers (sport shooter) =

British sports shooter (1936–2026)

Personal information
- Nationality: British (English)
- Born: 30 November 1936 Marylebone, London, England
- Died: 21 April 2026 (aged 89)
- Height: 173 cm (5 ft 8 in)
- Weight: 71 kg (157 lb)

Sport
- Sport: Sports shooting
- Event: Free Pistol

Anthony James Chivers (30 November 1936 – 21 April 2026) was a British international sports shooter who competed at the 1964 Summer Olympics.

== Biography ==
At the 1964 Olympic Games in Tokyo, he participated in the 50 metre pistol event.

Two years later he represented the England team at the 1966 British Empire and Commonwealth Games in Kingston, Jamaica. He competed in the 50 metres free pistol event.

Chivers died on 21 April 2026, at the age of 89.
