= Tony Clark (sport shooter) =

British sports shooter (1924–2009)

Personal information
- Nationality: British (English)
- Born: 17 June 1924 Southampton, England
- Died: 16 June 2009 (aged 84) Southampton, England
- Height: 183 cm (6 ft 0 in)
- Weight: 79 kg (174 lb)

Sport
- Sport: Sports shooting
Medal record
Shooting
Representing England
British Empire & Commonwealth Games
| Gold medal – first place | 1966 Kingston | rapid fire pistol |
| Silver medal – second place | 1966 Kingston | centre fire pistol |

Anthony John Clark (17 June 1924 – 16 June 2009) was a British international sports shooter who competed at four Olympic Games in 1960, 1964, 1968 and 1972 Summer Olympics.

== Biography ==
At the 1960 Olympic Games in Rome, he participated in the men's 25 metre rapid fire pistol and four years later at the 1964 Olympic Games in Tokyo, he competed in the same event.

Clark's finest achievements came when representing the England team at the 1966 British Empire and Commonwealth Games in Kingston, Jamaica. He competed in the rapid fire pistol and centre fire pistol events, winning gold and silver medals.

He appeared at two more Olympic Games in 1968 and 1972, again taking part in the 25 metres rapid-fire pistol, finishing 24th in 1966 and 34th in 1972.

Eight years later he competed in the rapid fire pistol event at the 1974 British Commonwealth Games in Christchurch, New Zealand.
