= Thomas Hewitt (sport shooter) =

Irish sports shooter

Personal information
- Nationality: Northern Irish
- Born: 8 March 1950 (age 76)
- Height: 179 cm (5 ft 10 in)
- Weight: 84 kg (185 lb)

Sport
- Sport: Sports shooting
- Event: Trap shooting
Medal record
Representing Northern Ireland
Commonwealth Games
Silver medal – second place	1986 Edinburgh	Trap pairs
Gold medal – first place	1994 Victoria	Trap pairs

Thomas Hewitt (born 8 March 1950) is a former sports shooter who represented Ireland at the 1980 Summer Olympics and Northern Ireland at the Commonwealth Games.

== Biography ==
At the 1980 Olympic Games, in Moscow, Hewitt participated in the mixed trap event.

Hewitt was selected for the 1986 Northern Irish team at the 1986 Commonwealth Games in Edinburgh, Scotland. He participated in the individual trap and trap pairs, winning a silver medal in the latter with Eamon Furphy.

In 1987 Hewitt and Furphy were named the Craigavon Sports Personality team of the year.
