= Peter Croft (physician) =

English physician

Peter R. Croft is an English physician and a primary care researcher.

He is currently Professor of Primary Care Epidemiology and Director, Primary Care Musculoskeletal Research Centre at Keele University Medical School. He has published extensively on the treatment of musculoskeletal problems in primary care.

Croft is one of the editors of the text Chronic Pain Epidemiology: From Aetiology to Public Health (Oxford University Press, 2010).
