= Gilbert U =

Hong Kong sports shooter

Personal information
- Full name: King Hung "Gilbert" U
- Nationality: Hong Kong
- Born: 15 May 1945 (age 81)
- Height: 1.80 m (5 ft 11 in)

Sport
- Sport: Sports shooting

King Hung "Gilbert" U (born 15 May 1945) is a Hong Kong sports shooter.

He finished 36th at the 1984 Summer Olympics, 29th at the 1988 Summer Olympics and 43rd at the 1992 Summer Olympics, all in the free pistol event. He won the bronze medal in the 50 metre free pistol event at the 1986 Asian Games, the bronze medal in the 10 metre air pistol event at the 1986 Commonwealth Games and the bronze medala in the 50 metre free pistol event at the 1990 Commonwealth Games.
