= Frank Wyatt (sport shooter) =

British sports shooter

Personal information
- Full name: Iles Frank Wyatt
- Born: 2 December 1946 (age 79) Hammersmith, London

Sport
- Sport: Sports shooting

Achievements and titles
- Olympic finals: 1972 Summer Olympics

Iles Frank Wyatt (born 2 December 1946) is a British former sports shooter.

== Sport shooting career ==
Wyatt competed in the 50 metre pistol event at the 1972 Summer Olympics.

He represented England and won a bronze medal in the 50 metres free pistol pair with Geoffrey Robinson, at the 1982 Commonwealth Games in Brisbane, Queensland, Australia. Twenty years later he made a second appearance at the Games when he competed in the 2002 Commonwealth Games in the 50 metres free pistol individual and pair events.
