= John Cooke (sport shooter) =

British sports shooter (1939–2008)

Personal information
- Born: 17 March 1939 Dartford, Kent, England
- Died: 9 April 2008 (aged 69)

Sport
- Sport: Sports shooting
Medal record
Sports shooting
Representing England
Commonwealth Games
Silver medal – second place	1978 Edmonton	rapid fire pistol
Gold medal – first place	1982 Brisbane	centre fire pistol
Bronze medal – third place	1982 Brisbane	centre fire pistol pairs
Bronze medal – third place	1982 Brisbane	rapid fire pistol

John Patrick Cooke (17 March 1939 – 9 April 2008) was a British sports shooter.

== Shooting career ==
Cooke competed at the 1972, 1976 and the 1984 Summer Olympics. He represented England in the rapid fire pistol and the 50 metres free pistol, at the 1974 British Commonwealth Games in Christchurch, New Zealand. Four years later he represented England and won a silver medal in the rapid fire pistol, at the 1978 Commonwealth Games in Edmonton, Alberta, Canada. A third Commonwealth Games appearance for England at the 1982 Commonwealth Games in Brisbane, Queensland, Australia resulted in a gold medal in the centre fire pistol, double bronze medals in the rapid fire pistol and centre fire pistol pairs with John Gough.
