= Alexander Taransky =

Australian sports shooter

Personal information
- Born: 8 January 1941
- Died: 8 December 2017 (aged 76)

Sport
- Sport: Sports shooting
- Event: Rapid Fire Pistol
Medal record
Men's shooting
Representing Australia
Commonwealth Games
Gold medal – first place	1982 Brisbane	Rapid-Fire Pistol - Pairs
Gold medal – first place	1982 Brisbane	Centre-Fire Pistol - Pairs

Alexander Taransky (8 January 1941 – 8 December 2017) was an Australian sports shooter. He competed at the 1968, 1972 and the 1976 Summer Olympics. He was also selected for the Australian Pistol Shooting Team for the 1980 Summer Olympics however the Australian Shooting Team joined the boycott of the Moscow Olympics. He competed at the 1982 Commonwealth Games in Brisbane where he won two gold medals for pistol shooting.
