= Barry Dagger =

British sports shooter (born 1937)

Personal information
- Full name: Barry Edward Dagger
- Born: 19 May 1937 (age 89) Grantham, Lincolnshire, England
Medal record
Sports shooting
Representing Great Britain
Olympic Games
Bronze medal – third place	1984 Los Angeles	10 m air rifle
Representing England
Commonwealth Games
Gold medal – first place	1982 Brisbane	50m rifle 3 Pos
Silver medal – second place	1982 Brisbane	10m air rifle

Barry Edward Dagger (born 19 May 1937) is a British former sport shooter. Dagger competed in the 1976 Summer Olympics and in the 1984 Summer Olympics. He represented England in the 50 metres rifle prone, at the 1978 Commonwealth Games in Edmonton, Alberta, Canada. He represented England and won a gold medal in the 50 metres Rifle 3 Position (Pair) and a silver medal in the 10 metres Air Rifle (Pair), at the 1982 Commonwealth Games in Brisbane, Queensland, Australia. Since retiring, Dagger has become a narrowboat owner and is active in the narrowboat communities, the boat is called Shooters Delight.

== See also ==
- Alister Allan
- Malcolm Cooper
