= Harry Willsie =

Canadian sports shooter

Personal information
- Born: 20 December 1928 Jacksonville, Missouri, United States
- Died: 3 January 2003 (aged 74) Lake Worth, Florida, United States

Sport
- Sport: Sports shooting

Harry Willsie (20 December 1928 – 3 January 2003) was a Canadian sports shooter. He competed at the 1964, 1968 and 1976 Summer Olympics.
