= Sandy Peden =

Canadian sports shooter (born 1934)

Personal information
- Born: 1934 (age 91–92) Edmonton, Alberta, Canada

Sport
- Country: Canada
- Sport: Sports shooting
- Event: Rifle

Sandy Peden (born 1934) is a Canadian sports shooter.

He competed in the Commonwealth Games, representing Canada at Brisbane 1982 and Auckland 1990.
