= Arthur Clarke (sport shooter) =

Fullbore shooter

Personal information
- Nationality: British (Scottish)
- Born: 3 December 1921
- Died: 4 July 2014 (aged 92)

Sport
- Sport: Sports shooting
Medal record
Representing Scotland
Commonwealth Games
Gold medal – first place	1982 Brisbane	full bore rifle

Arthur Eric Clarke (3 December 1921 – 4 July 2014) was a British Fullbore Rifle shooter. He represented Scotland in the Commonwealth Games in 1982, 1986 and 1990, winning gold in the Fullbore Rifle Queens Prize in the 1982 Commonwealth Games.

== Biography ==
Clarke won the Bisley Grand Aggregate on two occasions (1979, 1980) and came second twice (1968, 1985). In 1971, he founded a gunsmith shop in Camberley (A.E.Clarke & Co).

Clarke represented the Scottish team at the 1982 Commonwealth Games in Brisbane, Australia, where he competed in the shooting programme. He won a gold medal after winning the full bore rifle Queens prize event with a score of 387 points.

In 1983, he was a prime mover behind instigating the annual Intercounties Competition held at Bisley Ranges to encourage team shooting.

Clarke subsequently appeared at both the 1986 Commonwealth Games in Edinburgh and the 1990 Commonwealth Games in Auckland.
