= Ernie Neely =

Northern Irish sports shooter (born c. 1923)

Personal information
- Nationality: British (Northern Irish)
- Born: c. 1923 Northern Ireland

Sport
- Sport: Sports shooting
- Event(s): Fullbore rifle Centre fire pistol
- Club: Ulster fullbore RA

Ernest Neely (born c. 1923) is a former sports shooter from Northern Ireland, who competed at two Commonwealth Games.

== Biography ==
Neely, a post office official, was the secretary of the Ulster Full Bore Rifle Association. He was also an active participant of the U.R.A.

He represented the 1966 Northern Irish Team at the 1966 British Empire and Commonwealth Games in Kingston, Jamaica, participating in the centre fire pistol and fullbore rifle events.

Neely attended another Games, when he was part of the 1974 Northern Irish team at the 1974 British Commonwealth Games in Christchurch, New Zealand.

By 1977 he was the Chairman of the Uslter Rifle Association and in 1978 won his fifth Irish fullbore national championship.
