= Peter Croft (sport shooter) =

British sports shooter (born 1950)

Personal information
- Nationality: British
- Born: 4 July 1950 (age 75) Wednesbury, West Midlands
- Height: 180 cm (5 ft 11 in)
- Weight: 80 kg (176 lb)

Sport
- Sport: Sports shooting
- Event: Clay Pigeon Shooting
Medal record
Representing England
Commonwealth Games
| Bronze medal – third place | 1982 Brisbane | clay pigeon trap |
| Silver medal – second place | 1982 Brisbane | trap (pairs) |

Peter John Croft (born 4 July 1950) is a former sports shooter who represented Great Britain at the 1984 Summer Olympics and England and Scotland at the Commonwealth Games.

== Sports shooting career ==
At the 1984 Olymic Games in Los Angeles, Croft represented Great Britain in the trap event.

Croft was the 1980 individual trap European Shotgun Championships. He won the Grand Prix of Nations (Olympic Trap) in 1982 and 1983 and won the World Championship (Grand Mondial) in Universal Trap in 1982 as well as a Silver medal in the same event in 1980.

He represented England and won a bronze medal in the clay pigeon trap and a silver medal in the trap pairs with Peter Boden, at the 1982 Commonwealth Games in Brisbane, Australia.

Eight years later he represented Scotland in the individual and pairs trap event, at the 1990 Commonwealth Games in Auckland, New Zealand. He also won a bronze medal in the 1993 European Championships.
