= Tom Guinn =

Canadian sports shooter (born 1944)

Personal information
- Born: 1 September 1944 (age 80); St. Catharines, Ontario, Canada

Sport
- Sport: Sports shooting

Tom Guinn (born 1 September 1944) is a Canadian sports shooter. He competed at the 1976 Summer Olympics (Canada) and the 1984 Summer Olympics (USA).
