= Eli Ellis =

Australian sports shooter (1948–2025)

Personal information
- Full name: Eli James Ellis
- Born: 4 October 1948
- Died: 27 June 2025 (aged 76) Carwoola, New South Wales

Sport
- Sport: Sports shooting
Medal record
Commonwealth Games
Gold medal – first place	1982 Brisbane	Men's Open Trap - Pairs

Eli James "Jim" Ellis (4 October 1948 – 27 June 2025) was an Australian sports shooter. He competed at the 1984 Summer Olympics and 1982 and 1988 Commonwealth Games.

== Shooting career ==
Injuries in playing Australian football and cricket in Berrigan, New South Wales led Ellis to taking up clay target shooting. He moved to Canberra in 1970.

Ellis was selected to compete at the 1980 and 1984 Olympics with his results:

- 1980 Moscow - withdrew from team due Australian Government request
- 1984 Los Angeles - Men's Trap Final 6th

At the Commonwealth Games his results were:

- 1978 Edmonton - Men's Trap Final 4th
- 1982 Brisbane - Men's Trap Final 4th; Men's Trap Pairs (with Terry Rumbel) Final Gold Medal

He made his first Australian World Championships team in 1973 and his last was in 1987. At World Championships his medal results were:

- 1973 Melbourne - Men's Trap Team Bronze Medal
- 1978 Seoul - Men's Trap Bronze Medal
- 1981 San Miguel de Tucumán - Men's Trap Silver Medal

He was inducted in the Australian Clay Target Association National Hall of Fame in 2006. He was a Life Member of the Canberra International Clay Target Club.

He died in Carwoola, New South Wales on 27 June 2025. He was survived by his wife Ann and daughters Deonne and Elisha. His ashes were interred at the Berrigan Cemetery Memorial Wall.
