= Edward Jans =

Canadian sports shooter (born 1946)

Personal information
- Born: 17 August 1946 (age 79) Medicine Hat, Alberta, Canada

Sport
- Sport: Sports shooting

Edward A. Jans (born 17 August 1946) is a Canadian former sports shooter. He competed in the 50 metre pistol event at the 1972 Summer Olympics.
