= Pat Vamplew =

Canadian sports shooter (born 1952)

Personal information
- Born: 24 November 1952 (age 73) Toronto, Ontario, Canada

Sport
- Sport: Sports shooting

Patrick Blakely Vamplew (born 24 November 1952) is a Canadian sports shooter. He competed at the 1984 Summer Olympics and the 1988 Summer Olympics.
