= Bertram Manhin =

Trinidad and Tobago sports shooter

Personal information
- Born: 6 July 1934 (age 91) Arima, Trinidad and Tobago

Sport
- Sport: Sports shooting

Bertram Wesley Manhin (born 6 July 1934) is a Trinidad and Tobago former sports shooter. He competed in the 50 metre pistol event at the 1968 Summer Olympics.
