= Alec Crikis =

Australian sports shooter (1944–2016)

Personal information
- Nationality: Australian
- Born: 22 December 1944
- Died: 10 April 2016 (aged 71)

Sport
- Sport: Sports shooting

Alec Crikis (22 December 1944 – 10 April 2016) was an Australian sports shooter. He competed in the mixed skeet event at the 1984 Summer Olympics.
