= Solomon Lee =

Hong Kong sports shooter

Personal information
- Full name: Solomon Lee Kui Nang
- Nationality: Hong Konger
- Born: 6 June 1936
- Died: 20 December 2022 (aged 86)

Chinese name
- Traditional Chinese: 李鉅能
- Simplified Chinese: 李巨能
Transcriptions
Standard Mandarin
- Hanyu Pinyin: Lǐ Jùnéng
Yue: Cantonese
- Jyutping: Lei^{5} Geoi^{6}nang^{4}

Sport
- Sport: Sports shooting

Solomon Lee Kui Nang (traditional Chinese: 李鉅能; simplified Chinese: 李巨能; 6 June 1936 – 20 December 2022) was a Hong Kong sports shooter. He competed at the 1976 Summer Olympics and the 1984 Summer Olympics.

Lee died on 20 December 2022. At his death, he was married to Janie and had two sons and a granddaughter.
