= John Primrose (sport shooter) =

Canadian sport shooter (born 1942)

Personal information
- Born: 28 May 1942 (age 84) Ottawa, Ontario, Canada

Sport
- Sport: Sports shooting
Medal record
Representing Canada
Commonwealth Games
Gold medal – first place	1974 Christchurch	Trap
Gold medal – first place	1978 Edmonton	Trap
Pan American Games
Silver medal – second place	1975 Mexico City	Trap team
Silver medal – second place	1987 Indianapolis	Trap team
Silver medal – second place	1995 Mar del Plata	Trap team
Bronze medal – third place	1979 San Juan	Trap team

John Nairn Primrose (born 28 May 1942) is a Canadian trap shooter who competed at six Olympics from 1968 to 1992 (excluding 1980).

== Career ==
His best position was seventh in the Mixed Trap in the 1972 and 1976 Olympics. John won a gold medal in the 1975 Trap World Championships and the 1983 World Championships (see "Olympic Trap"). A high-light was winning the gold medal at the Commonwealth Games in Edmonton in 1978. He was inducted into the Alberta Sports Hall of Fame after winning his first Commonwealth gold medal in New Zealand.

John, a member of Clan Primrose, is the son of Justice Neil Primrose and the grandson of a lieutenant governor of Alberta, Philip Primrose.

He is one of only fifteen shooters to compete at six Olympic Games.

In 1985, he was made a Member of the Order of Canada.

== See also ==
- List of athletes with the most appearances at Olympic Games
