= Ian Hale =

Australian sports shooter (born 1950)

Personal information
- Nationality: Australian
- Born: 4 December 1950 (age 75)

Sport
- Sport: Sports shooting
Medal record
Men's shooting
Representing Australia
Commonwealth Games
Silver medal – second place	1982 Brisbane	Men's Skeet
Bronze medal – third place	1982 Brisbane	Men's Skeet Pairs
Gold medal – first place	1994 Victoria BC	Men's Skeet

Ian Maxwell Hale (born 4 December 1950) is an Australian sports shooter. He competed at the 1984 Summer Olympics and the 1988 Summer Olympics.
