= Charles Trotter =

British sports shooter

- Trotter being chaired through Bisley following his win in the final of H.M. The Queen's Prize, 1975
- Born: Charles Maitland Yorke Trotter; 8 February 1923; Edinburgh, Scotland
- Died: 8 September 2003 (aged 80); Surrey, England
- Occupations: Sports shooter; photographer
- Spouse: Joan Peary (m. 1963)
- Parents: James 'Maitland' Trotter (father); Margaret Trotter (mother)
- Military career
- Allegiance: United Kingdom
- Branch: British Army
- Service years: 1940–1945
- Rank: Captain
- Unit: Royal Engineers
- Conflict: World War II
- Sports career
- Country: Kenya (1951–1962); Scotland (1958–2000); Guernsey (1966–2001)
- Sport: Rifle shooting
Medal record
Shooting
Representing Guernsey
Commonwealth Games
| Bronze medal – third place | 1982 Brisbane | Fullbore singles |

Charles Maitland Yorke Trotter (8 February 1923 – 8 September 2003) was a British sports shooter and photographer who represented Guernsey and Kenya in both fullbore and smallbore disciplines. Trotter's achievements in rifle shooting made him one Guernsey's most decorated sportsmen.

Born in Edinburgh and educated at Elizabeth College, Guernsey, Trotter served in the Royal Engineers during World War II and then in Egypt after the war. After studying photography at the London School of Photo Engraving and Lithography, Trotter established a photography business in Nairobi from 1951 to 1962, achieving considerable success as a commercial photographer in British Kenya. During this time, Trotter represented Kenya at the 1956 and 1960 Summer Olympics.

After returning to Guernsey in 1966, Trotter won H.M. The Queen's Prize in 1975, becoming only the second winner of the event from the island. He represented Guernsey in three consecutive Commonwealth Games from 1974, winning a bronze medal in the Fullbore Rifle singles event at Brisbane 1982.

== Early life and education ==
Charles Maitland Yorke Trotter was born on 8 February 1923 in Edinburgh, Scotland. He was the son of James Maitland Yorke Trotter (2 March 1888 – c. 1960) who generally went by his middle name, Maitland, and Margaret Dippie Trotter (née Duncan; died 30 October 1962). Trotter's parents married in October 1921, two years before his birth. After his birth, Trotter's mother, a post-office clerk at the time, moved with him to Uganda, where his father was working as a surveyor in the Department of Land and Surveys in the Colonial Service. In the six years after his birth, Trotter accompanied his parents on a near-permanent safari owing to the itinerant nature of his father's work. He and his family mixed almost exclusively within the British colonial community where they enjoyed a busy social life, captured by his mother, who was a keen photographer.

At the age of six, Trotter returned to England where he attended boarding school, while his parents lived in Nigeria and later undertook a tour of the Caribbean through his father's work as a surveyor in the British Empire. In 1936, Trotter and his family relocated more permanently to Guernsey. He was educated in Guernsey at Elizabeth College, an all-boys public school, where he started shooting, and represented the school at the schools' championships at Bisley three times, captaining the team in 1940. That year, Trotter was evacuated along with fellow students and staff to Great Hucklow, Derbyshire during the German occupation of the Channel Islands. He took with him some valuable stamps collected by his father, twelve pounds and the addresses of friends in England.

== Life and career ==
=== Photography career; Olympic games: 1940–1966 ===
After leaving school in 1940, Trotter joined the Royal Engineers with whom he served during the Second World War. Later, Trotter commanded a group of German Prisoners of War in the Canal Zone in Egypt.

In 1949, Trotter enrolled in a photography course at the London School of Photo Engraving and Lithography, obtaining a first-class pass in his exams. Establishing a photography business in Nairobi, Kenya in 1951, Trotter achieved considerable success, and his work spanned a broad range of material, including weddings, natural history and news items. He also undertook commercial commissions showing industries of the time, and public occasions such as sporting and cultural events and royal visits. One of Trotter's film productions, a nature documentary about baboons, was awarded a Blue Ribbon Award.

During his time living in Kenya, Trotter represented the nation in the Men's Smallbore Rifle events (Prone and Three Positions) at two Olympic Games – Melbourne 1956 and Rome 1960 – and the World Championships in 1962.

Trotter returned to England in late 1962, living briefly in London and then to Fleet, Hampshire. He was employed as a photographer by the Royal Aircraft Establishment, first in Farnborough and later in Aberporth, Wales. Among other things, Trotter was tasked pictures of the de Havilland Comet.

On 15 February 1963, Trotter married his wife, Joan Peary. The two were involved in a head-on car collision in 1965, which rendered both disabled. In spite of the injuries which impaired his mobility, he was still able to continue shooting.

=== Queen's success; Commonwealth games: 1966–1987 ===
In 1966, Trotter returned to Guernsey. Soon after, he became the owner of a long-established gun shop on the island. He won the Scottish Fullbore Championship in 1972.

"I like tie-shoots, they bring out the best in me."

— Trotter's "phlegmatic" response to being told he'd tied with five others for the Queen's Prize.

In 1975, Trotter won H.M. The Queen's Prize after winning a six-way tie-shoot; it was the first time in history the competition had been decided in a six-way tie. In doing so, Trotter became only the second Guernseyman to win the competition, and he remains the island's most recent winner. He was awarded a gold medal, a gold badge, and £250 donated personally by the monarch herself, Elizabeth II. Soon after his return to the island, Trotter was voted as the island's Sportsman of the Year and was asked by the Guernsey Postal Services to be featured on one of its stamps in a series depicting disability in sport. Trotter reached the final of the Queen's prize on seven further occasions, also finishing twice in the top twenty-five of the St Georges prize, and won five bronze crosses in the Grand Aggregate.

In total, Trotter appeared for Guernsey in the Kolapore on twenty occasions and appeared in the Mackinnon for Scotland, Guernsey and the Channel Islands. Trotter represented the island in three consecutive Commonwealth Games from 1974, winning a bronze medal in the Fullbore Rifle event in the 1982 edition held in Brisbane, Australia. Trotter achieved tremendous success in local competitions also, winning the island smallbore championship twelve times from 1971 to 1986. Representing Great Britain, Trotter competed in the Smallbore World Championships in 1974 and 1982, and also represented Great Britain in 300 metres shooting, competing a number of times in the Masters and Nordic Championships. Trotter represented his birth-country, Scotland, fifteen times between 1958 and 1987.

=== Later years: 1987–2003 ===
Trotter was named Hampshire Fullbore Champion in 1994, and in 2000 he captained the Scotland national team. Throughout his career, Trotter reportedly made his own foresight rings; as he got older they got thinner until eventually he made them out of fuse wire. In 2001, Trotter gave up active participation in shooting, but remained in his role of President of the Old Elizabethan Rifle Club until his death, aged 80, in 2003.

== Legacy ==
Trotter's achievements in both smallbore and fullbore rifle shooting make him one Guernsey's most decorated marksmen, and he remains the last Guernseyman to win the Queen's Prize. Trotter's substantial collection of shooting silver and memorabilia is held in an exhibit in Castle Cornet. In 2005, Trotter was one of the first ten people to be inducted into the Guernsey Sports Commission's wall of fame. After his death, Trotter's ashes were scattered at Bisley at the beginning of the 2004 Imperial Meeting.

He was generally regarded as a calm and mild-mannered character, with his obituary describing him as "a quiet man with a wealth of experience"; "... always eager to hear how other members of the team had performed, but would say little of his achievements".

Regarded as "a leading commercial photographer" in Kenya in the 1950s, Trotter's photography during that time, particularly of British-Kenyan high society, along with his collection of around 50,000 negatives is regarded as "particularly rich resource" for the study of Kenya immediately prior to its independence in 1962.

== Statistics ==
=== International competitions ===
| Year | Competition | Venue | Position | Event | Notes |
Representing Kenya
| 1956 | Olympic Games | Melbourne, Australia | 42nd | Men's Smallbore Rifle, Three Positions, 50 metres | 1,030 ex 1200 |
| 1956 | Olympic Games | Melbourne, Australia | 41st | Men's Smallbore Rifle, Prone, 50 metres | 586 ex 600 |
| 1960 | Olympic Games | Rome, Italy | 37th | Men's Smallbore Rifle, Prone, 50 metres | 574 ex 600 |
Representing Guernsey
| 1974 | Commonwealth Games | Christchurch, New Zealand | 6th | Men's Smallbore Rifle, Prone, 50 metres | 587 ex 600 |
| 1978 | Commonwealth Games | Edmonton, Canada | 16th | Men's Smallbore Rifle, Prone, 50 metres | 1177 ex 1200 |
| 1982 | Commonwealth Games | Brisbane, Australia | 5th | Men's Smallbore Rifle, Prone, 50 metres | 1174 ex 1200 |
| 1982 | Commonwealth Games | Brisbane, Australia | 11th | Men's Smallbore Rifle, Prone, 50 metres (Pairs) | 1163 ex 1200 |
| 1982 | Commonwealth Games | Brisbane, Australia | 3rd | Fullbore Rifle, Queen's Prize individual | 384 ex 405 |
| 1982 | Commonwealth Games | Brisbane, Australia | 7th | Fullbore Rifle, Queen's Prize pairs | 557 ex 600 |

=== National titles ===
- Fullbore rifle
  - H.M. The Queen's Prize: 1975
  - Hampshire Fullbore Championship: 1994
  - Guernsey Fullbore Championship: 1979
  - Guernsey Fullbore Grand Aggregate: 1973
- Smallbore rifle
  - Scottish Smallbore Championship: 1972
  - Guernsey Smallbore Championship: 12 times
  - Smallbore Indoor Veteran Championship: 1984, 1985, 1986, 1987, 1988
