= Ken Stanford =

Irish sports shooter

Personal information
- Full name: Reginald Kenneth Stanford
- Nationality: British (Northern Irish)
- Born: 9 December 1937 (age 88) Belfast, Northern Ireland
- Height: 184 cm (6 ft 0 in)
- Weight: 80 kg (176 lb)

Sport
- Sport: Sports shooting
- Events: Rapid-Fire Pistol; Free Pistol; Centre fire pistol

Reginald Kenneth Stanford (born 9 December 1937) is a former sports shooter from Northern Ireland, who competed at 1980 Summer Olympics.

== Biography ==
Formerly a member of the Royal Ulster Constabulary (RUC), he represented Britain and Northern Ireland at a number of pistol shooting events.

Stanford represented the 1966 Northern Irish Team at the 1966 British Empire and Commonwealth Games in Kingston, Jamaica, participating in the free pistol, centre fire pistol and rapid fire pistol events.

Stanford attended another Games, when he was part of the 1974 Northern Irish team at the 1974 British Commonwealth Games in Christchurch, New Zealand.

He "controversially" represented Ireland at the 1980 Olympic Games in Moscow, participating in two shooting events. Stanford applied for three weeks special leave from his role as a Chief Inspector with the RUC to participate,
