= Malcolm Cooper =

British sports shooter (1947–2001)

Personal information
- Nickname: Cooperman
- National team: Great Britain; England
- Born: 20 December 1947 Camberley, Surrey, England
- Died: 9 June 2001 (aged 53) Eastergate, West Sussex, England

Sport
- Sport: Sports shooting
- Events: ISSF 50 meter rifle three positions; 300 m rifle three positions
Medal record
Men's shooting
Representing Great Britain
| Event | 1st | 2nd | 3rd |
|---|---|---|---|
| Olympic Games | 2 | - | - |
| World Shooting Championships | 7 | 4 | 4 |
| ISSF World Cup | 1 | 1 | 2 |
| European Shooting Championships | 14 | 5 | 2 |
Olympic Games
| Gold medal – first place | 1984 Los Angeles | 50 m Rifle 3 Positions |
| Gold medal – first place | 1988 Seoul | 50 m Rifle 3 Positions |
World Championships
| Gold medal – first place | 1978 Seoul | 300 m Standing 40 shots |
| Gold medal – first place | 1986 Skövde | 300 m Rifle prone |
| Gold medal – first place | 1986 Skövde | 300 m Standard Rifle |
| Gold medal – first place | 1986 Skövde | 300 m Prone 40 shots |
| Gold medal – first place | 1986 Skövde | 300 m Standing 40 shots |
| Gold medal – first place | 1990 Moscow | 300 m Kneeling 40 shots |
| Gold medal – first place | 1990 Moscow | 300 m Rifle 3 Positions |
| Silver medal – second place | 1978 Seoul | 50 m Rifle 3 Positions |
| Silver medal – second place | 1982 Caracas | 300 m Rifle prone |
| Silver medal – second place | 1986 Suhl | 50 m Rifle 3 Positions |
| Silver medal – second place | 1986 Skovede | 300 m Rifle 3 Positions |
| Bronze medal – third place | 1978 Seoul | 300 m Standard Rifle |
| Bronze medal – third place | 1982 Caracas | 300 m Rifle 3 Positions |
| Bronze medal – third place | 1982 Caracas | 300 m Kneeling 40 shots |
| Bronze medal – third place | 1990 Moscow | 300 m Standard Rifle |
Representing England
| Event | 1st | 2nd | 3rd |
|---|---|---|---|
| Commonwealth Games | 4 | 5 | 3 |

Malcolm Douglas Cooper, MBE, (20 December 1947 – 9 June 2001) was a British sport shooter and founder of Accuracy International. Competing in ISSF 50-metre and 300-metre rifle events, he dominated his events for several years, becoming the first shooter to win the Olympic 50-metre three-position rifle event twice. He held or shared five world records in 300-metre rifle events.

== Sports shooting career ==
Cooper learned to shoot at school in the UK and New Zealand. He also shot and practised at HMS Collingwood, a naval training establishment at Fareham in Hampshire, alongside Andy (Dusty) Miller, the 1968 Far East Services small-bore individual champion. He qualified to join the British Free Rifle Club in 1969. He was then selected for the British team to the 1972 Summer Olympics, where he finished 12th in the 300 m three-position rifle event and 18th in the 50 m three-position rifle.

After disappointing results at the 1974 World Shooting Championships and 1976 Summer Olympics, he made the decision to retire, until an interaction with Lones Wigger during a clinic held by the United States Army Marksmanship Unit in England inspired him to continue.

In 1977, Cooper won the European Championships in both 50 m and 300 m three-position events, with his 300 m standing score equalling the world record.

Having won most of his matches in 1980, the 1980 Summer Olympics boycott prevented Cooper from competing in Moscow, where he was a favourite to win a medal.

Cooper was the first shooter to win two consecutive gold medals in the Olympic 50 metre rifle three positions event, a feat which stood unrivalled for twenty-eight years until the 2016 Rio Olympics, when Italian shooter Niccolò Campriani matched the record by successfully defending his three-position title from the 2012 London Olympics.

Cooper won gold medals in the three-positions event at the 1984 Summer Olympics in Los Angeles and at the 1988 Summer Olympics in Seoul. The 1988 victory came despite his rifle being seriously damaged two days before the match. Working with the USSR armourer, he repaired the stock in time to compete.

Between the Olympics, Cooper became World Champion at the 1982 World Shooting Championships in 300 m Standard Rifle, by then a non-Olympic rifle discipline in which he claimed several European and world titles and held the world record for a period.

Cooper represented England at four Commonwealth Games between 1974 and 1990, winning twelve medals: four gold, five silver, and three bronze.

== Personal life ==
Cooper was born in 1947 in Camberley and learned to shoot whilst attending the Royal Hospital School at Holbrook in Suffolk, UK before his family moved to New Zealand where he attended Westlake Boys High School and learned the art of shooting small bore rifles. His father, who was in the Royal Navy was drafted there. Cooper started shooting competitively in 1970. In 1978 he co-founded rifle making company Accuracy International. He married Sarah Robinson in 1974.

Cooper died in June 2001 after an eight-month battle with cancer. He died at his home in Eastergate, West Sussex.

== See also ==
- Alister Allan
- Barry Dagger
- Sarah Cooper
