= Terry Rumbel =

Australian sports shooter

Personal information
- Full name: Terence Douglas Rumbel
- Born: 24 July 1951 (age 74)

Sport
- Sport: Sports shooting
Medal record
Commonwealth Games
Bronze medal – third place	1978 Edmonton	Men's Open Trap
Gold medal – first place	1982 Brisbane	Men's Open Trap - Pairs
Bronze medal – third place	1986 Edinburgh	Men's Open Trap - Pairs

Terry Douglas Rumbel (born 24 July 1951) is an Australian former sports shooter. He competed at the 1984 Summer Olympics.
