= Scotland at the 2006 Commonwealth Games =

- CG code: SCO
- CGA: Commonwealth Games Scotland
- Website: goscotland.org

in Melbourne, Australia
- Competitors: 166
- Flag bearer (opening): Ian Marsden
- Flag bearer (closing): Gregor Tait
- Officials: 70
- Medals Ranked 6th: Gold 11 Silver 7 Bronze 11 Total 29

Commonwealth Games appearances (overview)
- 1930; 1934; 1938; 1950; 1954; 1958; 1962; 1966; 1970; 1974; 1978; 1982; 1986; 1990; 1994; 1998; 2002; 2006; 2010; 2014; 2018; 2022; 2026; 2030

Scotland competed at the 2006 Commonwealth Games in Melbourne, Australia, from 15 to 26 March 2006.

The Commonwealth Games Council for Scotland announced on 3 November 2005 that Scotland would be sending 166 athletes (104 men and 62 women) to compete in the Games in Melbourne, supported by 70 officials. This was a smaller team than the country fielded at the 2002 Commonwealth Games in Manchester, England, when Scotland sent 207 athletes and 85 officials.

The main team departed on 28 February 2006 from Glasgow Airport; they flew on Emirates, one of the team's main sponsors. Other sources of financial support included Clydesdale Bank, sportscotland, the Commonwealth Games Endowment fund, and the Scottish general public.

Despite the withdrawal of judo (an event where Scotland had won many previous medals) from the programme in 2006, the team proved greatly successful. Scotland achieved what was at that time its highest Gold medal total, a record it would later break in the 2014 Commonwealth Games. The team won 11 gold medals, 7 silver medals and 11 bronze medals.

== Medals ==
| | (gold) | (silver) | (bronze) | Total |
|---|---|---|---|---|
| Scotland | 11 | 7 | 11 | 29 |

=== Gold ===
Boxing:

(gold) Kenneth Anderson, Light Heavyweight 81 kg

Cycling:

(gold) Ross Edgar, Chris Hoy & Craig MacLean, Men's Team Sprint

Bowls:

(gold) Alex Marshall & Paul Foster, Men's Doubles

Shooting:

(gold) Sheena Sharp and Susan Jackson, Women's 50 m Rifle Prone Pairs
(gold) Sheena Sharp, Women's 50 m Rifle Prone Individual

Swimming:

(gold) David Carry, Men's 400 m Freestyle
(gold) David Carry, Men's 400 m Individual Medley
(gold) Caitlin McClatchey, Women's 200 m Freestyle
(gold) Caitlin McClatchey, Women's 400 m Freestyle
(gold) Gregor Tait, Men's 200 m Backstroke
(gold) Gregor Tait, Men's 200 m Individual Medley

=== Silver ===
Athletics:

(silver) Chris Baillie, Men's 110 m Hurdles

Cycling:

(silver) Ross Edgar, Men's Sprint

Bowls:

(silver) Joyce Lindores & Kay Moran Women's Bowls Pairs

Shooting:

(silver) Martin Sinclair & Neil Stirton, Men's 50 m Rifle Prone Pairs

Swimming:

(silver) Kirsty Balfour, Women's 200 m Breaststroke
(silver) Euan Dale, Men's Individual Medley
(silver) David Carry, Euan Dale, Andrew Hunter & Robert Renwick, Men's 200 m Freestyle Relay

=== Bronze ===
Athletics:

(bronze) Lee McConnell, Women's 400 m Hurdles

Badminton:

(bronze) Susan Hughes, Women's Singles

Cycling:

(bronze) Kate Cullen, Women's Points Race
(bronze) Ross Edgar, Men's Keirin
(bronze) Chris Hoy, Men's 1 km Time Trial
(bronze) James McCallum, Men's Scratch

Gymnastics:

(bronze) Adam Cox, Men's Horizontal Bar

Swimming:

(bronze) Kirsty Balfour, Women's 100 m Breaststroke.
(bronze) Gregor Tait, Men's 100 m Backstroke.
(bronze) Gregor Tait, Todd Cooper, Craig Houston & Kris Gilchrist, Men's 4x100 m Medley Relay.

Weightlifting:

(bronze) Thomas Yule, Men's 94 kg

== Team ==
=== Aquatics ===
==== Diving ====
- Monique McCarroll Diving platform

==== Swimming ====
Men

- David Carry – 200 m, 400 m freestyle
- Ross Clark – 50 m breast
- Todd Cooper – 50 m, 100 m, 200 m butterfly
- Euan Dale – 200 m, 400 m individual medley
- Kris Gilchrist – 200 m breast
- Craig Houston – 50 freestyle
- Andrew Hunter – 200 freestyle
- Chris Jones – 50 m breast
- Robert Lee – 50 m breast
- David Leith – 50 m butterfly
- Robbie Renwick – 200 m freestyle
- Gregor Tait* – 100 m backstroke, 200 m backstroke, 200 m individual medley

Women

- Kirsty Balfour – 100 m breast, 200 m breast
- Fiona Booth – 50 m breast
- Kerry Buchan – 100 m breast, 200 m breast
- Stephanie Hill – 100 m butterfly
- Caitlin McClatchey – 200 m, 400 m, 800 m freestyle
- Hannah Miley – 400 m individual medley
- Lorna Smith – 400 m individual medley
- Lara Fergusson – 50 m, 100 m freestyle (EAD)

=== Athletics ===
Men

- Chris Baillie – 110 m hurdles
- Iain Park* – Hammer
- Darren Ritchie – Long jump
- Allan Scott – 110 m hurdles
- Kevin Sheppard – 3000 m steeplechase
- Nick Stewart – 400 m hurdles
- Mark Taylor* – high jump

Women

- Kathy Butler – 5,000 m, 10,000 m
- Gillian Cooke – Long jump
- Shona Crombie–Hicks – Marathon
- Collette Fagan – 10,000 m
- Hayley Haining – Marathon
- Lee McConnell – 200 m, 400 m, 400 m hurdles
- Kirsty Maguire – Paul Vault
- Hayley Ovens – 1,500 m
- Susan Partridge – Marathon
- Susan Scott – 800 m, 1500 m
- Shirley Webb – Hammer

=== Badminton ===
Men

| Athlete | Events | Club |
|---|---|---|
| Andrew Bowman | mixed doubles | Bellshill |

Women

| Athlete | Events | Club |
|---|---|---|
| Michelle Douglas | doubles | New Stevenston |
| Susan Hughes | singles | Glasgow |
| Kirsteen McEwan-Miller | mixed doubles | Bridge of Weir |
| Yuan Wemyss | singles, doubles | Dumfries |

=== Basketball ===
Men

- Keiron Achara
- Robert Archibald
- Keith Bunyan
- Laurie Costello
- Mark Duncan
- Campbell Flockhart
- Stuart Mackay
- Gareth Murray
- Tom Pearson
- Scott Russell
- James Steel
- Joshua Tackie
- Ross Szifris
- Dan Wardrope

(Non travelling reserves have also been identified.)

=== Boxing ===
- Mitch Prince – 60 kg
- Mark Hastie* – 64 kg
- Kris Carslaw – 69 kg
- Craig McEwan* – 75 kg
- Kenny Anderson – 81 kg
- Stephen Simmons* – 91 kg

=== Cycling ===
Men

- Alex Coutts – Road Race
- Ross Edgar – Track Sprint Events
- Chris Hoy – Track Sprint Events
- Marco Librizzi – Track Sprint Events
- Craig MacLean – Track Sprint Events
- Gareth Montgomerie – Mountain Bike Cross Country
- Evan Oliphant – Road Race
- James Ouchterlony – Mountain Bike Cross Country
- Duncan Urquhart – Road Race
- Robert Wardell – Mountain Bike Cross Country

Women

- Kate Cullen – Track Points Race and Road Race
- Ruth McGavigan – Mountain Bike Cross Country

=== Gymnastics ===
Men

- Adam Cox Men's Artistic
- Steve Frew Men's Artistic
- Daniel Keatings Men's Artistic
- Barry Koursarys Men's Artistic
- Andrew Mackie Men's Artistic

Women

- Carol Galashan Women's Artistic
- Helen Galashan Women's Artistic
- Jennifer Hannah Women's Artistic
- Rosalie Hutton* Women's Artistic
- Emma White Women's Artistic

=== Hockey ===
Men

- Jonathan Christie
- Michael Christie
- Allan Dick
- Stephen Dick
- Graham Dunlop
- Michael Leonard
- Adam MacKenzie
- David Mansouri
- Vishal Marwaha
- Alistair McGregor
- David Mitchell
- Graham Moodie
- David Ralph
- Mark Ralph
- Douglas Simpson
- Niall Stott

Head coach: Mathias Ahrens

Reserves: Gareth Hall and Derek Salmond.

Women

- Vikki Bunce
- Jane Burley
- Louise Carroll
- Linda Clement
- Catriona Forrest
- Samantha Judge
- Nikki Kidd
- Julie Kilpatrick
- Debbie McLeod
- Louise Munn
- Cath Rae
- Emma Rochlin
- Alison Rowatt
- Catriona Semple
- Rhona Simpson
- Cheryl Valentine

Head coach: Lesley Hobley

Reserves: Holly Cram and Katrina Cameron.

=== Lawn bowls ===
Men

| Athlete | Events | Club |
|---|---|---|
| Darren Burnett | singles | Arbroath BC |
| Paul Foster | pairs | Troon Portland BC |
| Alex Marshall | pairs | Gifford BC |
| David Peacock | triples | Danderhall BC |
| Colin Mitchell | triples | Carrick Knowe |
| Colin Peacock | triples | Marchmount BC, Dumfries |

Women

| Athlete | Events | Club |
|---|---|---|
| Margaret Letham | singles | Burbank Hamilton BC |
| Kay Moran | pairs | Crookston BC |
| Joyce Lindores | pairs | Ettrick Forest BC |
| Linda Brennan | triples | Blantyre BC |
| Betty Forsyth | triples | Blantyre BC |
| Seona Black | triples | Bonnybridge BC |

=== Rugby sevens ===
- Ciaran Beattie
- Oli Brown
- David Gray
- Colin Gregor
- Clark Laidlaw
- Rory Lawson
- Mark Lee
- Ross Rennie
- Alasdair Strokosch
- Andrew Turnbull
- Alistair Warnock

=== Shooting ===
Men

| Athlete | Events |
|---|---|
| Robert Carroll | Standard pistol & Centre-Fire Pistol |
| Stewart Cumming | Double trap |
| Robin Law | 10 m Air Rifle |
| David Lewis | Air pistol & Free Pistol |
| Ian Marsden | Skeet |
| Jonathan Reid | Trap |
| Alan Ritchie | Air pistol & Free Pistol |
| Graham Rudd | 50 m 3-Positions & 10 m Air Rifle |
| Ian Shaw | Fullbore rifle |
| Martin Sinclair | 50 m Prone Rifle & 50 m 3-Positions |
| Neil Stirton | 50 m Prone Rifle |
| Mike Thomson | Skeet |

Women

| Athlete | Events |
|---|---|
| Emma Cole Hamilton | 50 m 3-Positions & 10 m Air Rifle |
| Susan Jackson | 50 m 3-Positions & 50 m Prone Rifle |
| Shona Marshall | Olympic Trap |
| Heather Rudd | 10 m Air Rifle |
| Sheena Sharp | 50 m Prone Rifle |

=== Squash ===
Men

| Athlete | Events |
|---|---|
| Harry Leitch | singles, men's doubles |
| John White | singles, men's doubles |

Women

| Athlete | Events |
|---|---|
| Frania Gillen-Buchert | singles, women's doubles |
| Louise Philip | singles, women's doubles |

=== Triathlon ===
- Catriona Morrison
- Kerry Lang

=== Weightlifting ===
- Peter Kirkbride (85 kg)
- Thomas Yule (91 kg)

== See also ==
- Commonwealth Games Council for Scotland
- Scotland at the 2002 Commonwealth Games
