= Wales at the 2006 Commonwealth Games =

- CG code: WAL
- CGA: Commonwealth Games Council for Wales
- Website: teamwales.net

in Melbourne, Australia
- Competitors: 143 in 14 sports
- Medals Ranked 13th: Gold 3 Silver 5 Bronze 11 Total 19

Commonwealth Games appearances (overview)
- 1930; 1934; 1938; 1950; 1954; 1958; 1962; 1966; 1970; 1974; 1978; 1982; 1986; 1990; 1994; 1998; 2002; 2006; 2010; 2014; 2018; 2022; 2026; 2030

The team to represent Wales at the 2006 Commonwealth Games was announced by the Commonwealth Games Council for Wales (CGCW) on 22 February 2006.

It consisted of 143 athletes (63 Women and 80 men) competing across 14 sports; 85 fewer than the squad in 2002.

The team was not able to improve on their medal tally from the 2002 Commonwealth Games when Wales won 6 Gold, 13 Silver and 12 Bronze medals. The team was captained by Dame Tanni Grey-Thompson.

== Medals ==
	(gold)	(silver)	(bronze)	Total
Wales	3	5	11	19

=== Gold ===
Weightlifting:

- Michaela Breeze, Women's 63 kg

Swimming:

- David Davies, Men's 1500 m Freestyle

Shooting:

- David Phelps, Men's 50 m Rifle Prone

=== Silver ===
Athletics:

- Julie Crane, Women's High Jump

Boxing:

- Kevin Evans

Gymnastics:

- David Eaton, Men's Horizontal Bar

Lawn bowls:

- Robert Weale, Men's Singles
- Betty Morgan, Women's Singles

=== Bronze ===
Athletics:

- Beverley Jones, Women's 100 m EAD T37
- Hayley Tullett, Women's 1500 m

Boxing:

- Jamie Crees, Light Welterweight 64 kg
- Darren Edwards, Featherweight 57 kg
- Mo Nasir, Light Flyweight 48 kg

Cycling:

- Nicole Cooke, Women's Road Race
- Geraint Thomas, Men's Points Race

Shooting:

- Johanne Brekke, Women's 50 m Rifle Prone
- Gruffudd Morgan and David Phelps, Men's 50 m Rifle Prone Pairs

Swimming:

- David Davies, Men's 400 m Freestyle
- David Roberts (swimmer), Men's 100 m EAD Freestyle

== Squad ==
The Welsh squad for the 2006 Commonwealth Games is as follows:

=== Athletics ===
==== Men ====
- 100 m: Christian Malcolm
- 200 m: Christian Malcolm
- 400 m: Gareth Warburton
- 400 m hurdles: Matt Elias, Rhys Williams.
- 4 × 400 m relay: Gareth Warburton, Matt Elias, Rhys Williams, Dai Greene, Christian Malcolm
- 1500 m: James Thie
- 5000 m: Chris Davies
- Long jump: Steven Shalders
- Triple jump: Steven Shalders
- High jump: Robert Mitchell
- Pole vault: Scott Simpson
- 100 m (Disabled): Neville Bonfield

==== Women ====
- 200 m: Chelsea Foster
- 400 m: Catherine Murphy
- 800 m: Hayley Tullett
- 1500 m: Hayley Tullett, Natalie Lewis
- 10,000 m: Catherine Dugdale
- High jump: Julie Crane
- Hammer: Carys Parry, Leslie Brannen, Laura Douglas
- Discus: Phillipa Roles
- Marathon: Tracey Morris
- 100 m (Disabled): Beverley Jones
- 800 m (Disabled): Tanni Grey-Thompson
- Shot (Disabled): Julie Hamzah

=== Badminton ===
Men

Athlete	Events
Mathew Hughes	singles, men's doubles
Martyn Lewis	singles, men's doubles
Jonathan Morgan	singles, men's doubles
James Phillips	men's doubles
Richard Vaughan	singles, men's doubles, mixed doubles

Women

Athlete	Events
Kelly Morgan	singles, mixed doubles

=== Boxing ===
Men

Athlete	Events	Club
Jamie Crees	Light welterweight 64 kg	Prince of Wales ABC, Cardiff
Matthew Edmonds	Bantamweight 54 kg	St Joseph's ABC, Newport
Darren Edwards	Featherweight 57 kg	Cwmavon Hornets, Port Talbot
Kevin Evans	Super heavyweight 91 kg	Carmarthen ABC
Chris Jenkins	Flyweight 51 kg	Cwmgors ABC, Ammanford
Mo Nasir	Light-flyweight 48 kg	St Joseph's ABC, Newport
Aaron Thomas	Welterweight 69 kg	Clwyd ABC
Robbie Turley	Lightweight 60 kg	St Joseph's ABC, Newport

=== Cycling ===
==== Men ====
- Mountain bike cross-country: Steven Roach
- Endurance: 20 km scratch: Geraint Thomas, Matt Brammeier, Ross Sander
- Endurance: 40 km scratch: Geraint Thomas, Ross Sander
- Endurance: 40 km points: Matt Brammeier
- Endurance: road race: Geraint Thomas, Julian Winn, Dale Appleby, Yanto Barker, Rob Partridge, Steven Roach
- Endurance: time trial: Geraint Thomas, Julian Winn

==== Women ====
- Endurance: 25 km points: Nicole Cooke
- Endurance: road race: Nicole Cooke

=== Gymnastics ===
==== Men ====
- Artistic: David Eaton

==== Women ====
- Artistic: Samantha Bayley, Lynnett Lisle, Rhian Pugh, Melaine Roberts, Jessica Gazzi
- Rhythmic: Francesca Jones

=== Lawn bowls ===
Men

Athlete	Events	Club
Andrew Atwood	triples	Caerphilly Town BC
Jason Greenslade	pairs	Dinas Powys BC
Neil Rees	pairs	Parc y Dre BC, Llanelli
Martin Selway	triples	Caerphilly Town BC
Kevin Wall	triples	Cwmbran Park BC
Robert Weale	singles	Presteigne BC

Women

Athlete	Events	Club
Anwen Butten	triples	Lampeter BC
Lisa Forey	triples	Stradey Ladies, Llanelli
Shirley King	pairs	Llandrindod Wells BC
Gillian Miles	pairs	Sophia Gardens BC
Betty Morgan	singles	Llandrindod Wells BC
Kathy Pearce	triples	Berriew BC

=== Netball ===
With a team captained by Ursula Bowers, Wales finished 8th in the netball at the 2006 Commonwealth Games. In the 7th/8th playoff, they lost 46–43 to South Africa.

Pool 2

Friday 17 March; 20:30 (UTC+11)	Report; Stats	Wales	22–78	Australia	Umpires: Pauline Sciascia; Chris Campbell; Reserve umpire: Bobbi Brown
Friday 17 March; 20:30 (UTC+11)	Report; Stats	Scoring by quarter: 4-17, 7-22, 7-19, 4-20			Umpires: Pauline Sciascia; Chris Campbell; Reserve umpire: Bobbi Brown
Friday 17 March; 20:30 (UTC+11)	Report; Stats	Rebecca James 13/22 (59%); Rhiannon Ace 5/9 (56%); Nicola Lewis 3/7 (43%); Jamilla Abbott 1/3 (33%)		Susan Pratley 25/27 (93%); Sharelle McMahon 20/20 (100%); Catherine Cox 20/28 (71%); Megan Dehn 13/16 (81%)	Umpires: Pauline Sciascia; Chris Campbell; Reserve umpire: Bobbi Brown

Sunday 19 March; 20:30 (UTC+11)	Report; Stats	Samoa	49–42	Wales	Umpires: Stacey Campton; Amanda Nottingham; Reserve umpire: Jacqui Jashari
Sunday 19 March; 20:30 (UTC+11)	Report; Stats	Scoring by quarter: 17-10, 9-15, 12-7, 11-10			Umpires: Stacey Campton; Amanda Nottingham; Reserve umpire: Jacqui Jashari
Sunday 19 March; 20:30 (UTC+11)	Report; Stats	Cathrine Latu 40/44 (91%); Malu Fa'asavalu 9/16 (56%); Aloma Inu 0/1 (0%)		Rebecca James 31/41 (76%); Amanda Evans 11/18 (61%)	Umpires: Stacey Campton; Amanda Nottingham; Reserve umpire: Jacqui Jashari

Monday 20 March; 15:00 (UTC+11)	Stats	Jamaica	74–21	Wales	Umpires: Anne Abraitis; Pauline Sciascia; Reserve umpire: Marion Johnson-Hurley
Monday 20 March; 15:00 (UTC+11)	Stats	Scoring by quarter: 21-2, 22-4, 15-7, 16-8			Umpires: Anne Abraitis; Pauline Sciascia; Reserve umpire: Marion Johnson-Hurley
Monday 20 March; 15:00 (UTC+11)	Stats	Elaine Davis 46/56 (82%); Simone Forbes 24/26 (92%); Jodi Ann Ffrench 4/5 (80%)		Rebecca James 16/24 (67%); Nicola Lewis 4/6 (67%); Jamilla Abbott 1/1 (100%)	Umpires: Anne Abraitis; Pauline Sciascia; Reserve umpire: Marion Johnson-Hurley

Tuesday 21 March; 20:30 (UTC+11)	Stats	Wales	45–36	Singapore	Umpires: Bill Alexander; Stacey Campton; Reserve umpire: Sharon Kelly
Tuesday 21 March; 20:30 (UTC+11)	Stats	Scoring by quarter: 11-8, 12-6, 13-8, 9-14			Umpires: Bill Alexander; Stacey Campton; Reserve umpire: Sharon Kelly
Tuesday 21 March; 20:30 (UTC+11)	Stats	Rhiannon Ace 22/30 (73%); Rebecca James 13/19 (68%); Jamilla Abbott 10/20 (50%); Nicola Lewis 0/1 (0%)		Tan Hui Yan 24/31 (77%); Jeanine Heng Wei Ping 11/13 (85%); Li Ling 1/7 (14%)	Umpires: Bill Alexander; Stacey Campton; Reserve umpire: Sharon Kelly

Thursday 23 March; 09:00 (UTC+11)	Stats	Barbados	34–55	Wales	Umpires: Jacqui Jashari; Sharon Kelly; Reserve umpire: Chris Campbell
Thursday 23 March; 09:00 (UTC+11)	Stats	Scoring by quarter: 8-15, 8-13, 9-13, 9-14			Umpires: Jacqui Jashari; Sharon Kelly; Reserve umpire: Chris Campbell
Thursday 23 March; 09:00 (UTC+11)	Stats	Lydia Bishop 21/24 (88%); Latonia Blackman 8/15 (53%); Laurel Browne 5/5 (100%)		Rebecca James 38/43 (88%); Rhiannon Ace 17/28 (61%)	Umpires: Jacqui Jashari; Sharon Kelly; Reserve umpire: Chris Campbell

Table

Pos	Team	P	W	D	L	GF	GA	GD	Pts
1	Australia	5	4	1	0	387	169	+218	9
2	Jamaica	5	4	1	0	324	174	+150	9
3	Samoa	5	3	0	2	264	254	+10	6
4	Wales	5	2	0	3	185	271	-86	4
5	Barbados	5	2	0	3	183	279	-96	4
6	Singapore	5	0	0	5	150	346	-196	0

Qualified for Semi-finals
Qualified for Classification

7th/8th playoff

Friday 24 March; 15:00 (UTC+11)	Report; Stats	South Africa	46–43	Wales	Umpires: Chris Campbell; Bobbi Brown; Reserve umpire: Anne Abraitis
Friday 24 March; 15:00 (UTC+11)	Report; Stats	Scoring by quarter: 11-15, 11-10, 12-9, 12-9			Umpires: Chris Campbell; Bobbi Brown; Reserve umpire: Anne Abraitis
Friday 24 March; 15:00 (UTC+11)	Report; Stats	Christine Markgraaff 28/38 (74%); Sindisiwe Gumede 11/11 (100%); Lizanne Helmand 6/12 (50%); Nthabiseng Moabi 1/1 (100%)		Rebecca James 31/41 (76%); Rhiannon Ace 12/19 (63%)	Umpires: Chris Campbell; Bobbi Brown; Reserve umpire: Anne Abraitis

Squad

Wales roster
Players
Coaches

Name	Pos	DOB	Height	Club	Nat	Caps
Jamilla Abbott	GS, GA	27 August 1979 (aged 26)	1.88 m (6 ft 2 in)	Celtic Dragons
Rhiannon Ace	GA, WA	13 April 1979 (aged 26)	1.65 m (5 ft 5 in)	Celtic Dragons
Sophie Baxter	WA, C	10 May 1986 (aged 19)	1.68 m (5 ft 6 in)	Team Bath
Ursula Bowers (c)	WD, GD, GK, C	29 June 1978 (aged 27)	1.81 m (5 ft 11 in)	Team Bath
Suzy Drane	C, WA	27 November 1986 (aged 19)	1.72 m (5 ft 8 in)	Celtic Dragons
Amanda Evans	GA, WA	23 August 1984 (aged 21)	1.70 m (5 ft 7 in)	Celtic Dragons
Sara Hale	GD, WD	7 October 1982 (aged 23)	1.76 m (5 ft 9 in)	Celtic Dragons
Lynda James	GK, GD	26 January 1977 (aged 29)	1.83 m (6 ft 0 in)	Celtic Dragons
Rebecca James	GS, GA	26 June 1985 (aged 20)	1.82 m (6 ft 0 in)	Loughborough Lightning
Nicola Lewis	GS, GA	9 February 1977 (aged 29)	1.78 m (5 ft 10 in)	Celtic Dragons
Anna Mayes	WA, C	8 February 1981 (aged 25)	1.65 m (5 ft 5 in)	Celtic Dragons
Nicola Szehofner	GD, GK	26 August 1984 (aged 21)	1.78 m (5 ft 10 in)	Celtic Dragons

Head coach

- Julia Longville

Assistant coach

- Caroline Morgan

Manager: Alison Dacey

Notes

- (c) – Captain
- (cc) – Co-captain
- (vc) – Vice-captain
- – Injury / maternity leave
- (TRP) – Temporary Replacement Player

=== Power lifting ===
- Gideon Griffiths

=== Rugby sevens ===
Richie Pugh (capt, Ospreys), Rhys Williams (Blues), Rhodri McAtee (Penzance), James Hook (Ospreys), James Merriman (Gloucester), Johnathan Edwards (Scarlets), Rhys Oakley (Dragons), Robin Sowden-Taylor (Blues), Wayne Evans (Blues), Gareth Baber (Dragons), Tal Selley (Scarlets), Jonathan Vaughton (Ospreys).

=== Shooting ===
==== Men ====
- Skeet: Malcolm Allen, Tony Grove
- Trap: Mike Wixey, James Birkett-Evans
- 10 m air pistol: Ian Harris, Alan Green
- 25 m centre fire: Steve Pengelly, Alan Green
- 25 m standard pistol: Steve Pengelly, Alan Green
- 50 m pistol: Ian Harris
- 10 m: air rifle: Martyn Blake, John Croydon
- 50 m rifle 3 positions: Martyn Blake, John Croydon
- 50 m: rifle prone: Griff Morgan, David Phelps

==== Women ====
- Trap: Sarah Wixey
- 10 m air rifle: Jennifer Corish, Sian Corish
- 50 m rifle 3 positions: Jennifer Corish, Sian Corish
- 50 m rifle prone: Johanne Brekke, Ceri Dallimore

==== Open ====
- Full Bore(Queens Prize): Gareth Morris, Alexander Woodward

=== Squash ===
Men

Athlete	Events
David Evans	singles, men's doubles
Alex Gough	singles, men's doubles
Gavin Jones	singles, mixed doubles

Women

Athlete	Events
Tegwen Malik	singles, mixed doubles

=== Swimming ===
- Men: David Davies, Thomas Haffield, Owen Morgan, Stuart Manford, David Roberts
- Women: Jazmin Carlin, Bethan Coole, Julie Gould, Jemma Lowe, Lowri Tynan, Cari-Fflur Davies, Rhiannon Henry

=== Table tennis ===
- Men: Ryan Jenkins, Stephen Jenkins, Adam Robertson, David Buck.
- Women: Bethan Daunton, Siwan Mair Davies, Naomi Owen, Claire Harris, Sara Head

=== Triathlon ===
- Men: Marc Jenkins
- Women: Leanda Cave, Anneliese Heard, Helen Tucker

=== Weightlifting ===
- Men: Terry Perdue.
- Women: Michaela Breeze, Kate Howard, Natasha Perdue.

== See also ==
- Sport in Wales
- Wales at the Commonwealth Games
