= Cyprus at the 2006 Commonwealth Games =

- CGF code: CYP
- CGA: Cyprus Olympic Committee
- Website: olympic.org.cy (in Greek and English)

in Melbourne, Australia
- Competitors: 43
- Flag bearers: Opening: Closing:
- Medals Ranked 14thth: Gold 3 Silver 1 Bronze 2 Total 6

Commonwealth Games appearances (overview)
- 1978; 1982; 1986; 1990; 1994; 1998; 2002; 2006; 2010; 2014; 2018; 2022; 2026; 2030

The Official Logo of the Cyprus Commonwealth Games Association

Team pin

Cyprus was represented at the 2006 Commonwealth Games in Melbourne by a contingent of 43 sportspersons and officials.

== Medals ==
| | (gold) | (silver) | (bronze) | Total |
|---|---|---|---|---|
| Cyprus | 3 | 1 | 2 | 6 |

== Medalists ==
=== Gold ===
- George Achilleos and Antonis Nikolaides, Shooting, Men's Skeet Pairs
- George Achilleos, Shooting, Men's Skeet
- Andri Eleftheriou, Shooting, Women's Skeet

=== Silver ===
- Lauryn Mark and Natalia Rahman, Shooting, Women's Skeet Pairs

=== Bronze ===
- Herodotos Giorgallas, Gymnastics, Men's Rings
- Kyriacos Ioannou, Athletics, Men's High Jump
