= Douglas Simpson =

Scottish field hockey player (born 1982)

Personal information
- Born: 15 May 1982 (age 44) Glasgow, Scotland

Sport
- Sport: Field hockey
- Position: Forward
Senior career
Years	Team	Caps	Goals
–2002	Stepps HC	-	-
2002–	Western Wildcats	-	-
National team
Years	Team	Caps	Goals
–	Scotland		-

Douglas Simpson (born 15 May 1982) is a former field hockey player from Scotland.

== Biography ==
Simpson started his career at Stepps HC before moving to Western Wildcats in 2002. Simpson enjoyed a free-scoring partnership with Scott McCartney for some years.

His predatory skills are also shown off to great effect indoors, where he has also picked up caps. A career highlight was selection for Scotland Commonwealth Games team for the 2006 Commonwealth Games in Melbourne, along with teammates Graham Dunlop and David Mansouri.
