= Kevin Wall (bowls) =

Welsh international lawn bowler

Personal information
- Nationality: British (Welsh)
- Born: c.1979 Pontypool, Wales

Sport
- Sport: Lawn and indoor bowls
- Club: Cwmbran Park BC; Gosforth BC; Torfaen IBC

Kevin Anthony Wall (c.1979) is a former international lawn bowler from Wales who competed at the Commonwealth Games.

== Biography ==
Wall was a member of the Cwmbran Park Bowls Club and represented Wales at international level from 1997 to 2006.

Wall, a branch manager at Acorn Fluid Power in Cwmbran by profession, he represented the Welsh team at the 2006 Commonwealth Games in Melbourne, Australia, where he competed in the triples event, with Andrew Atwood and Martin Selway.

In 2006, Wall married in Newcastle upon Tyne and joined Gosforth Bowls Club and switched allegiance to England, receiving his first English cap in 2009.
