= Allan Dick (field hockey) =

Scottish field hockey player

Personal information
- Born: 8 June 1983 (age 43) Kirkcaldy, Scotland

Sport
- Sport: Field hockey
- Position: Goalkeeper
Senior career
Years	Team	Caps	Goals
2006	Inverleith	-	-
2008–2011	Surbiton	-	-
2011–2014	Holcombe	-	-
2014–2024	Southgate	-	-
National team
Years	Team	Caps	Goals
2003–2014	Scotland	51	-

Allan Dick (born 8 June 1983) is a male former field hockey goalkeeper from Scotland.

== Biography ==
Dick played for club hockey for Inverleith Hockey Club in the Scottish leagues and earned his first cap for the Scotland men's national field hockey team in 2003. While at Inverleith he was part of the Scotland Commonwealth Games team at the 2006 Commonwealth Games in Melbourne.

He left Inverleith to play in the Men's England Hockey League playing for Surbiton until he joined Holcombe in 2011. Later, in September 2014, he left Holcombe for Southgate.

He missed the 2010 Commonwealth Games because of a knee injury but made 51 international appearances for Scotland before he retired. He later became a Hockey Development Officer and a PE Co-ordinator at Cubitt Town Infants School on the Isle of Dogs, London. In addition to his athletic and professional pursuits, he served as a Queen's Baton Bearer during the 2014 Commonwealth Games in Glasgow.

He became the assistant coach for Southgate from 2016-2018 and in August 2020, Dick was appointed the ladies 1st team head coach for the Upminster Hockey Club.

== Family ==
His younger brother Stephen is also a member of the men's national squad.
