= Shooting at the 2006 Commonwealth Games =

- Venue: Wellsford Rifle Range (Bendigo); Melbourne Gun Club (Lilydale); Melbourne International Shooting Club (Port Melbourne)
- Location: Australia
- Dates: 15–26 March 2006

Shooting at the 2006 Commonwealth Games was the tenth appearance of Shooting at the Commonwealth Games. The events were held in Melbourne, Australia, from 15 to 26 March 2006 and featured contests in 40 disciplines.

The shooting events was held at various venues around Melbourne; the clay target shooting was held at the Melbourne Gun Club, in Lilydale. The full bore events were held at the Wellsford Rifle Range in Bendigo and the small bore, pistol and air weapon events were held at the Melbourne International Shooting Club in Port Melbourne.

India topped the shooting medal table by virtue of winning 16 gold medals.

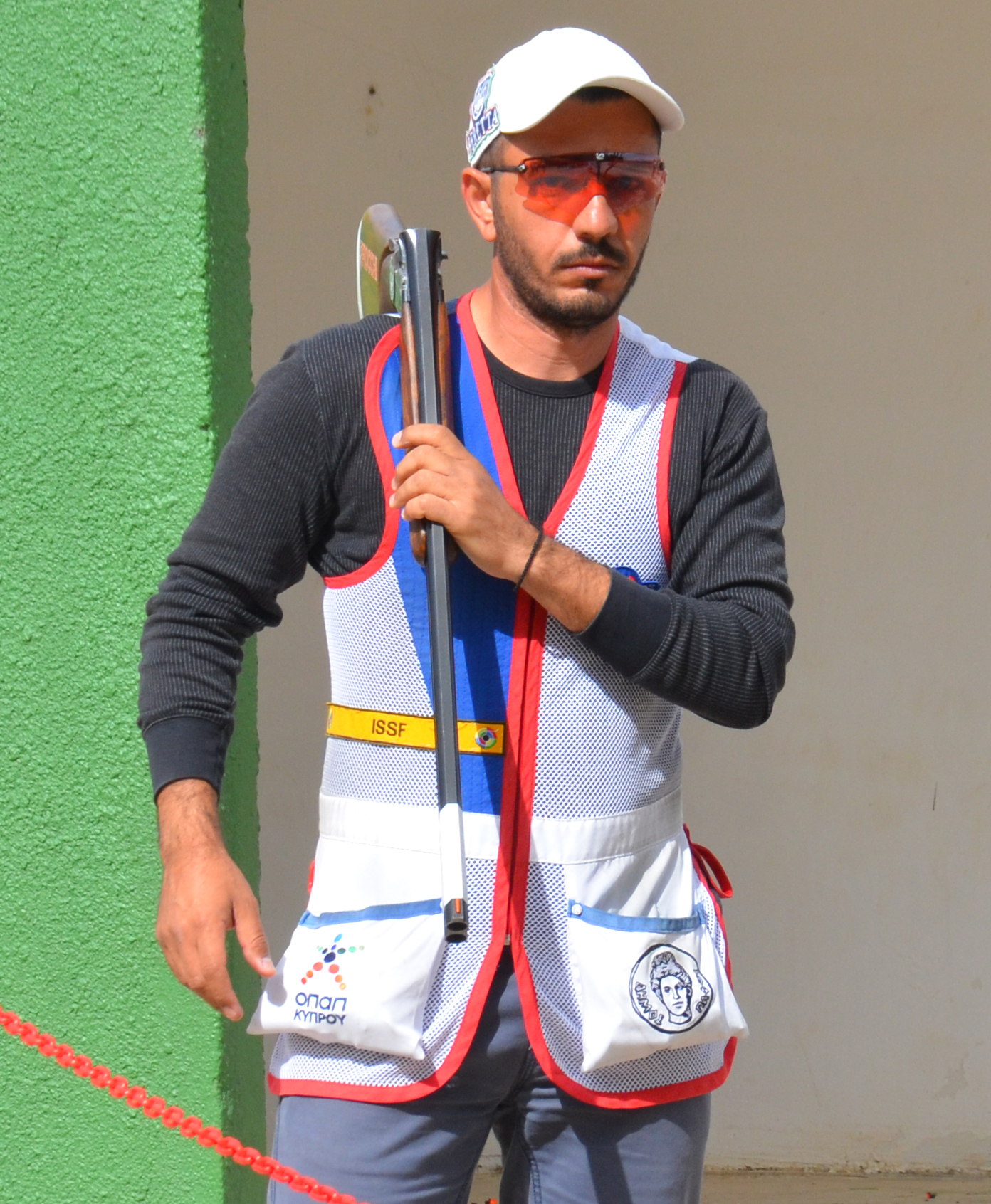
Cypriot George Achilleos won double gold in the skeet

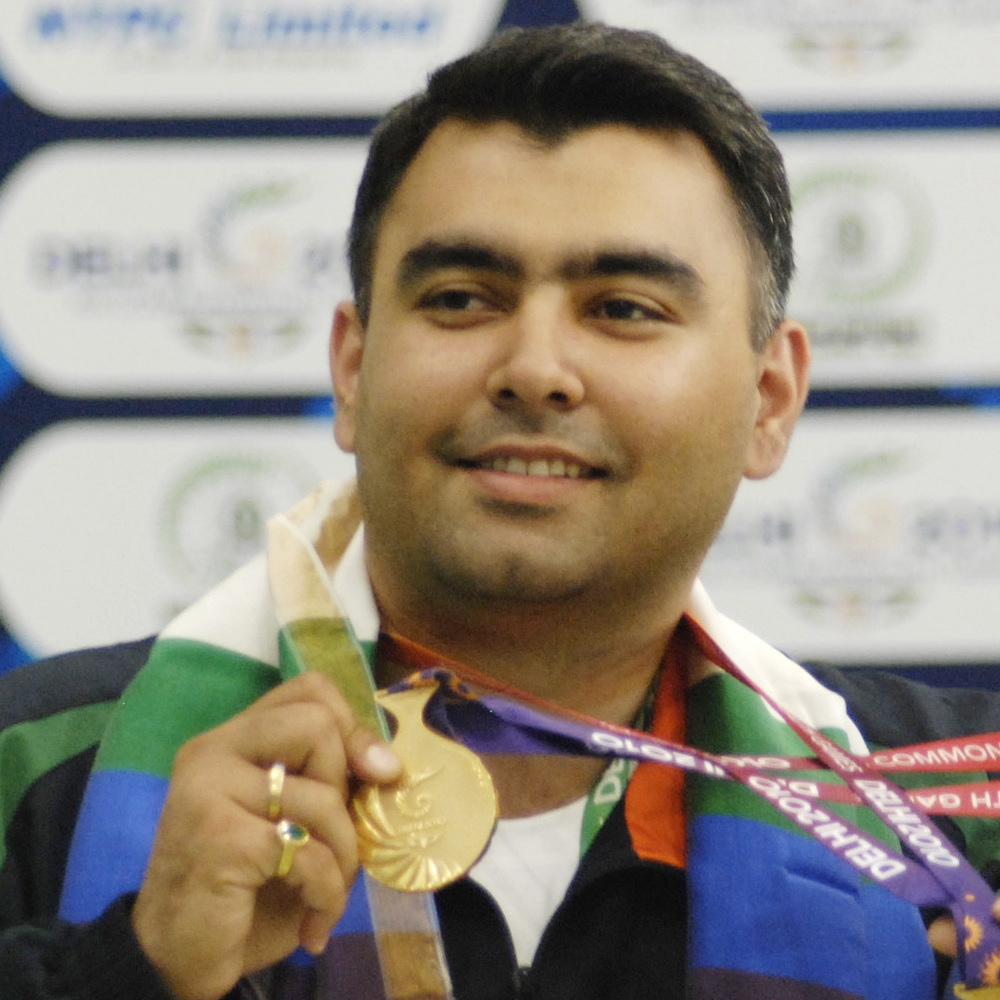
Indian shooter Gagan Narang claimed four medals

== Medal table ==
* Host nation (Australia)

Rank	Nation	Gold	Silver	Bronze	Total
1	India	16	7	4	27
2	Australia*	9	9	5	23
3	England	6	8	5	19
4	Cyprus	3	1	0	4
5	Scotland	2	1	0	3
6	South Africa	1	2	2	5
7	New Zealand	1	2	1	4
8	Singapore	1	1	3	5
9	Wales	1	0	2	3
10	Canada	0	3	7	10
11	Malaysia	0	1	4	5
12	Malta	0	1	1	2
13	Bangladesh	0	1	0	1
13	Northern Ireland	0	1	0	1
13	Pakistan	0	1	0	1
16	Isle of Man	0	0	1	1
16	Namibia	0	0	1	1
16	Trinidad and Tobago	0	0	1	1
Totals (18 entries)		40	39	37	116

== Clay target ==
=== Men's Trap (Singles) ===
Medal	Shooter	Total
Gold	(New Zealand) Graeme Ede (NZL)	258
Silver	(Northern Ireland) David Beattie (NIR)	255
Bronze	(India) Manavjit Singh Sandhu (IND)	250

=== Men's Trap (Pairs) ===
Medal	Shooter	Total	Combined
Gold	(Australia) Michael Diamond (AUS)	95	189
Gold	(Australia) Adam Vella (AUS)	94	189
Silver	(Canada) Tye Warner Bietz (CAN)	96	185
Silver	(Canada) Kirk Reynolds (CAN)	89	185
Bronze	(Isle of Man) Trevor Charles Boyles (IOM)	92	183
Bronze	(Isle of Man) David Robert Walton (IOM)	91	183

=== Women's Trap (Singles) ===
Medal	Shooter	Total
Gold	(South Africa) Diane Swanton (RSA)	92
Silver	(Malta) Rebecca Madyson (MLT)	86
Bronze	(Canada) Susan Nattrass (CAN)	83

=== Women's Trap (Pairs) ===
Medal	Shooter	Total	Combined
Gold	(Australia) Suzanne Balogh (AUS)	41	87
Gold	(Australia) Deserie Baynes (AUS)	46	87
Not awarded (only 3 entries)
Not awarded (only 3 entries)

=== Men's Double Trap (Singles) ===
Medal	Shooter	Total
Gold	(India) Rajyavardhan Singh Rathore (IND)	181
Silver	(South Africa) Byron Swanton (RSA)	180
Bronze	(Malta) William Chetcuti (MLT)	179

=== Men's Double Trap (Pairs) ===
Medal	Shooter	Total	Combined
Gold	(Australia) Russell Mark (AUS)	93	186
Gold	(Australia) Craig Trembath (AUS)	93	186
Silver	(India) Vikram Bhatnagar (IND)	90	179
Silver	(India) Rajyavardhan Singh Rathore (IND)	89	179
Bronze	(England) Richard Faulds (ENG)	89	176
Bronze	(England) Stevan Walton (ENG)	87	176

=== Women's Double Trap (Singles) ===
Medal	Shooter	Total
Gold	(England) Charlotte Kerwood (ENG)	106
Silver	(England) Rachel Parish (ENG)	101
Bronze	(Canada) Cynthia Meyer (CAN)	97

=== Women's Double Trap (Pairs) ===
Medal	Shooter	Total	Combined
Gold	(England) Charlotte Kerwood (ENG)	66	134
Gold	(England) Rachel Parish (ENG)	68	134
Silver	(Canada) Cynthia Meyer (CAN)	66	121
Silver	(Canada) Susan Nattrass (CAN)	57	121
Not awarded (only 4 entries)

=== Men's Skeet (Singles) ===
Medal	Shooter	Total
Gold	(Cyprus) Georgios Achilleos (CYP)	148
Silver	(Australia) Clive Barton (AUS)	147
Bronze	(Canada) Clayton Miller (CAN)	143

=== Men's Skeet (Pairs) ===
Medal	Shooter	Total	Combined
Gold	(Cyprus) Georgios Achilleos (CYP)	97	190
Gold	(Cyprus) Antonis Nikolaidis (CYP)	93	190
Silver	(England) Clive Bramley (ENG)	91	186
Silver	(England) Richard Brickell (ENG)	95	186
Bronze	(Australia) Clive Barton (AUS)	91	183
Bronze	(Australia) George Barton (AUS)	92	183

=== Women's Skeet (Singles) ===
Medal	Shooter	Total
Gold	(Cyprus) Andri Eleftheriou (Cyp)	89
Silver	(Australia) Lauryn Mark (AUS)	89
Bronze	(England) Pinky Le Grelle (ENG)	89

=== Women's Skeet (Pairs) ===
Medal	Shooter	Total	Combined
Gold	(Australia) Lauryn Mark (AUS)	45	90
Gold	(Australia) Natalia Rahman (AUS)	45	90
Silver	(Cyprus) Andri Eleftheriou (CYP)	46	88
Silver	(Cyprus) Louiza Theophanous (CYP)	42	88
Not awarded (only 4 entries)

== Pistol ==
=== Men's 10m Air Pistol (Singles) ===
Medal	Shooter	Total
Gold	(India) Samaresh Jung (IND)	584
Silver	(Australia) Daniel Repacholi (AUS)	579
Bronze	(Namibia) Friedhelm Sack (NAM)	578

=== Men's 10m Air Pistol (Pairs) ===
Medal	Shooter	Total	Combined
Gold	(India) Samaresh Jung (IND)	578	1154
Gold	(India) Vivek Singh (IND)	576	1154
Silver	(England) Nick Baxter (ENG)	569	1144
Silver	(England) Mick Gault (ENG)	583	1144
Bronze	(Australia) David Moore (AUS)	575	1141
Bronze	(Australia) Daniel Repacholi (AUS)	566	1141

=== Women's 10m Air Pistol (Singles) ===
Medal	Shooter	Total
Gold	(Australia) Lalita Yauhleuskaya (AUS)	484.8
Silver	(Australia) Dina Aspandiyarova (AUS)	484.3
Bronze	(Canada) Kim Eagles (Can)	477.6

=== Women's 10m Air Pistol (Pairs) ===
Medal	Shooter	Total	Combined
Gold	(Australia) Dina Aspandiyarova (AUS)	386	770
Gold	(Australia) Lalita Yauhleuskaya (AUS)	384	770
Silver	(Malaysia) Joseline Lee Yean Cheah (MAS)	375	758
Silver	(Malaysia) Bibiana Ng Pei Chin (MAS)	383	758
Bronze	(England) Georgina Geikie (ENG)	373	750
Bronze	(England) Julia Lydall (ENG)	375	750

=== Men's 25m Rapid Fire Pistol (Singles) ===
Medal	Shooter	Total
Gold	(India) Vijay Kumar (IND)	581
Silver	(India) Pemba Tamang (IND)	580
Bronze	(Malaysia) Amir Hasli Izwan Bin (MAS)	573

=== Men's 25m Rapid Fire Pistol (Pairs) ===
Medal	Shooter	Total	Combined
Gold	(India) Vijay Kumar (IND)	571	1134
Gold	(India) Pemba Tamang (IND)	563	1134
Silver	(Australia) David Chapman (AUS)	568	1116
Silver	(Australia) Bruce Favell (AUS)	548	1116
Bronze	(Canada) Metodi Igorov (CAN)	558	1111
Bronze	(Canada) Yuri Movshovich (CAN)	553	1111

=== Women's 25m Pistol (Singles) ===
Medal	Shooter	Total
Gold	(Australia) Lalita Yauhleuskaya (AUS)	582
Silver	(India) Sushma Rana (IND)	573
Bronze	(Canada) Kim Eagles (Can)	572

=== Women's 25m Pistol (Pairs) ===
Medal	Shooter	Total	Combined
Gold	(India) Saroja Kumari Jhuthu (IND)	574	1140
Gold	(India) Sushma Rana (IND)	566	1140
Silver	(Australia) Pamela Mckenzie (AUS)	565	1134
Silver	(Australia) Lalita Yauhleuskaya (AUS)	569	1134
Bronze	(Canada) Avianna Chao (CAN)	556	1130
Bronze	(Canada) Kim Eagles (CAN)	574	1130

=== Men's 25m Centre Fire Pistol (Singles) ===
Medal	Shooter	Total	Shoot-off
Gold	(Singapore) On Shaw Ming (SIN)	578	144
Silver	(New Zealand) Gregory Yelavich (NZL)	578	141
Bronze	(India) Samaresh Jung (IND)	578	47

=== Men's 25m Centre Fire Pistol (Pairs) ===
Medal	Shooter	Total	Combined
Gold	(India) Samaresh Jung (IND)	577	1150
Gold	(India) Jaspal Rana (IND)	573	1150
Silver	(England) Peter Flippant (ENG)	579	1138
Silver	(England) Simon Lucas (ENG)	559	1138
Bronze	(South Africa) Allan Stuart McDonald (RSA)	563	1135
Bronze	(South Africa) Daniel Van Tonder (RSA)	572	1135

=== Men's 25m Standard Pistol (Singles) ===
Medal	Shooter	Total	Shoot-Off
Gold	(England) Mick Gault (ENG)	568	44
Silver	(Pakistan) Irshad Ali (PAK)	568	41
Bronze	(Australia) Bruce Quick (AUS)	562	

=== Men's 25m Standard Pistol (Pairs) ===
Medal	Shooter	Total	Combined
Gold	(India) Samaresh Jung (IND)	565	1139
Gold	(India) Ronak Pandit (IND)	574	1139
Silver	(Australia) David Moore (AUS)	543	1112
Silver	(Australia) Bruce Quick (AUS)	569	1112
Bronze	(South Africa) Allan Stuart McDonald (RSA)	547	1106
Bronze	(South Africa) Daniel Francois Van Tonder (RSA)	559	1106

=== Men's 50m Pistol (Singles) ===
Medal	Shooter
Gold	(India) Samaresh Jung (IND)
Silver	(England) Mick Gault (ENG)
Bronze	(Trinidad and Tobago) Roger Daniel (TRI)

=== Men's 50m Pistol (Pairs) ===
Medal	Shooter	Total	Combined
Gold	(Australia) David Moore (AUS)	537	1086
Gold	(Australia) Daniel Repacholi (AUS)	549	1086
Silver	(India) Samaresh Jung (IND)	547	1082
Silver	(India) Vivek Singh (IND)	539	1082
Bronze	(England) Nick Baxter (ENG)	530	1078
Bronze	(England) Mick Gault (ENG)	548	1078

== Small Bore and Air Rifle ==
=== Men's 10m Air Rifle (Singles) ===
Medal	Shooter	Total
Gold	(India) Gagan Narang (IND)	597
Silver	(Singapore) Jin Zhang (SIN)	595
Bronze	(India) Abhinav Bindra (IND)	594

=== Men's 10m Air Rifle (Pairs) ===
Medal	Shooter	Total	Combined
Gold	(India) Abhinav Bindra (IND)	591	1189
Gold	(India) Gagan Narang (IND)	598	1189
Silver	(Bangladesh) Asif Hossain Khan (BAN)	594	1181
Silver	(Bangladesh) Anjan Kumer Singha (BAN)	587	1181
Bronze	(Singapore) Jun Hong ONG (SIN)	584	1177
Bronze	(Singapore) Jin ZHANG (SIN)	593	1177

=== Women's 10m Air Rifle (Singles) ===
Medal	Shooter
Gold	(India) Tejaswini Sawant (IND)
Silver	(India) Avneet Kaur Sidhu (IND)
Bronze	(Singapore) Yu Zhen Vanessa Yong (SIN)

=== Women's 10m Air Rifle (Pairs) ===
Medal	Shooter	Total	Combined
Gold	(India) Tejaswini Sawant (IND)	395	791
Gold	(India) Avneet Kaur Sidhu (IND)	396	791
Silver	(Canada) Monica Fyfe (CAN)	391	781
Silver	(Canada) Cynthia Hamulau (CAN)	390	781
Bronze	(Singapore) Yu Zhen Vanessa Yong (SIN)	393	781
Bronze	(Singapore) Jingna Zhang (SIN)	384	781

=== Men's 50m Rifle 3 Position (Singles) ===
Medal	Shooter	Total
Gold	(India) Gagan Narang (IND)	1163
Silver	(India) Abhinav Bindra (IND)	1151
Bronze	(Australia) Ben Burge (AUS)	1150

=== Men's 50m Rifle 3 Position (Pairs) ===
Medal	Shooter	Total	Combined
Gold	(India) Abhinav Bindra (IND)	1144	2287
Gold	(India) Gagan Narang (IND)	1143	2287
Silver	(Australia) Michael Brown (AUS)	1129	2269
Silver	(Australia) Ben Burge (AUS)	1140	2269
Bronze	(England) Jason Burrage (ENG)	1129	2265
Bronze	(England) Chris Hector (ENG)	1136	2265

=== Women's 50m Rifle 3 Position (Singles) ===
Medal	Shooter	Total
Gold	(India) Anuja Jung (IND)	670.7
Silver	(South Africa) Esmari Van Reenen (RSA)	670
Bronze	(Malaysia) Mohamed Nur Suryani Binti (MAS)	688

=== Women's 50m Rifle 3 Position (Pairs) ===
Medal	Shooter	Total	Combined
Gold	(England) Louise Minett (ENG)	574	1143
Gold	(England) Becky Spicer (ENG)	569	1143
Silver	(India) Anjali Mandar Bhagwat (IND)	573	1142
Silver	(India) Anuja Jung (IND)	569	1142
Bronze	(Malaysia) Mohamed Nur Suryani Binti (MAS)	573	1140
Bronze	(Malaysia) Baharin Nurul Hudda Binti (MAS)	569	1140

=== Men's 50m Rifle Prone (Singles) ===
Medal	Shooter	Total
Gold	(Wales) David Phelps (WAL)	596
Silver	(England) Michael Babb (ENG)	593
Bronze	(India) Sanjeev Rajput (IND)	594

=== Men's 50m Rifle Prone (Pairs) ===
Medal	Shooter	Total	Combined
Gold	(England) Michael Babb (ENG)	591	1182
Gold	(England) Chris Hector (ENG)	591	1182
Silver	(Scotland) Martin Sinclair (SCO)	589	1179
Silver	(Scotland) Neil Stirton (SCO)	590	1179
Bronze	(Wales) Gruffudd Morgan (WAL)	583	1176
Bronze	(Wales) David Phelps (WAL)	593	1176

=== Women's 50m Rifle Prone (Singles) ===
Medal	Shooter	Total
Gold	(Scotland) Sheena Sharp (SCO)	586
Silver	(New Zealand) Juliet Etherington (NZL)	585
Bronze	(Wales) Johanne Brekke (WAL)	584

=== Women's 50m Rifle Prone (Pairs) ===
Medal	Shooter	Total	Combined
Gold	(Scotland) Susan Jackson (SCO)	578	1166
Gold	(Scotland) Sheena Sharp (SCO)	588	1166
Silver	(England) Sharon Lee (ENG)	582	1161
Silver	(England) Helen Spittles (ENG)	579	1161
Bronze	(New Zealand) Juliet Etherington (NZL)	581	1161
Bronze	(New Zealand) Kathryn Mead (NZL)	580	1161

== Full Bore Rifle ==
=== Mixed Singles ===
Medal	Shooter	Total
Gold	(Australia) Bruce Scott (AUS)	403.60
Silver	(England) Parag Patel (ENG)	402.57
Bronze	(Australia) James Corbett (AUS)	401.57

=== Mixed Pairs ===
Medal	Shooter	Total	Combined
Gold	(England) Glyn Barnett (ENG)	297.43	594.87
Gold	(England) Parag Patel (ENG)	297.44	594.87
Silver	(Australia) James Corbett (AUS)	296.35	593.74
Silver	(Australia) Bruce Scott (AUS)	297.39	593.74
Bronze	(Malaysia) Md Zainal Abidin Bin (MAS)	297.42	592.72
Bronze	(Malaysia) Hamsan Zulkeflee Bin (MAS)	295.30	592.72
