= Rachel Parish =

English international sportswoman

Personal information
- Nationality: British
- Born: 21 May 1981 (age 45)
- Occupation: Doctor

Sport
- Country: United Kingdom
- Sport: Sport shooter
- Event: Trap
Medal record
Women's shooting
Representing Great Britain
ISSF Grand Prix
Silver medal – second place	2017 Moscow	Team double trap
Bronze medal – third place	2017 Moscow	Double trap
Representing England
Commonwealth Games
Gold medal – first place	2006 Melbourne	Double trap pairs
Silver medal – second place	2006 Melbourne	Double trap
Bronze medal – third place	2014 Glasgow	Double trap
Commonwealth Championships
Bronze medal – third place	2017 Brisbane	Double trap
- Updated on 10 November 2017

Rachel Parish (born 21 May 1981) is an English international sportswoman who won a shooting gold medal and silver medal at the 2006 Commonwealth Games in Melbourne. Before going to university, she went to Wellington College in Berkshire. Already holding a degree in Biochemistry and Genetics from The University of Nottingham from 2002, Parish then read medicine at Southampton University, graduating as a doctor in 2007. Parish is also a keen fencer, and has captained both the Nottingham and Southampton university fencing teams.

Selected for the Commonwealth Games at Melbourne in 2006, she shot in the double trap pairs competition in partnership with Charlotte Kerwood and together they took the gold medal. Rachel also won a silver medal in the double trap individuals.

She also claimed double trap team silver and individual bronze at the 2017 ISSF Grand Prix in Moscow, which was held alongside (but not part of) that year's World Shotgun Championships.
