= Vishal Marwaha =

Scottish field hockey player

Personal information
- Born: 8 May 1976 (age 50) Glasgow, Scotland

Sport
- Sport: Field hockey
Senior career
Years	Team	Caps	Goals
1992–2011	Western Wildcats	-	-
National team
Years	Team	Caps	Goals
1996–2011	Scotland	190	-
2003–2003	GB	13	-

Vishal Marwaha (born 8 May 1976) is a Scottish former field hockey player. He played for the Great Britain men's national field hockey team and Scotland men's national field hockey team.

== Biography ==
Marwaha played his entire career at Western Wildcats, making his debut in the first team in 1996 and captaining the team for three seasons from 2003 to 2006.

He gained his first Scotland cap in 1996 against France and first GB cap on 1 July 2003. He was part of the Scotland Commonwealth Games team at the 2006 Commonwealth Games in Melbourne.

Marwaha played for Scotland during the 2010 Commonwealth Games in Delhi.

He retired from playing in 2011 after winning a final Scottish Cup. He took over as 1st team coach at Wildcats for the season 2011-12 He lives in Glasgow.
