= Noi Tucker =

Australian lawn bowler (born 1960)

Personal information
- Nationality: Australia
- Born: 1 December 1960 (age 65) Thailand

Sport
- Club: Jindalee Bowls Club
Medal record
Representing Australia
Lawn bowls
Commonwealth Games
Silver medal – second place	2006 Melbourne	triples

Thong Auan 'Noi' Tucker (born 1 December 1960) is a former Australian international lawn and indoor bowler.

She won a silver medal in the triples with Ceri Ann Davies and Roma Dunn at the 2006 Commonwealth Games in Melbourne.

Born in Thailand she now lives in Jindalee, Western Australia and won her first Australian cap in 2006. She announced her international retirement in 2007.
