= Peter Flippant =

British sports shooter (born 1962)

Personal information
- Nationality: English
- Born: 25 July 1962 (age 63) Lincoln

Sport
- Sport: Sport shooting
- Club: Bedford Pistol Club
Medal record
Sports shooting
Representing England
Commonwealth Games
Silver medal – second place	2006 Melbourne	Centre Fire Pistol pair

Peter Flippant (born 1962) is a male retired British sport shooter.

== Sport shooting career ==
He represented England in the centre fire pistol, at the 1998 Commonwealth Games in Kuala Lumpur, Malaysia. Four years later he made a second Games appearance at the 2002 Commonwealth Games in Manchester. A third Games appearance in 2006 resulted in winning a silver medal in the centre fire pistol pair with Simon Lucas.
