= Adam MacKenzie =

Scottish field hockey player

Personal information
- Born: 25 October 1984 (age 41) Kirkcaldy, Scotland

Sport
- Sport: Field hockey
- Position: Defender
Senior career
Years	Team	Caps	Goals
1998–2014	Inverleith	-	-
2015	Western Wildcats	-	-
National team
Years	Team	Caps	Goals
–	Scotland		-

Adam MacKenzie (born 25 October 1984 ) is a former field hockey defender from Scotland.

== Biography ==
MacKenzie joined Inverleith Hockey Club as a 14 year old and earned his first cap for the men's junior national team in 2003.

He continued to play club hockey for Inverleith in the Scottish leagues until 2015. While at Inverleith he was part of the Scotland Commonwealth Games team at the 2006 Commonwealth Games in Melbourne.

In 2015 he joined Western Wildcats but did continue to play indoor hockey for Inverleith.

== Family ==
He is the brother-in-law of Na Piarsaigh Junior B City Football champion Brian Buckley.
