= Kim Eagles =

Canadian sports shooter

Personal information
- Full name: Kimberley-Anne Eagles
- Born: 15 December 1976 (age 49) Montreal, Quebec

Sport
- Country: Canada
- Sport: Shooting
Medal record
Commonwealth Games
| Gold medal – first place | 2002 Manchester | Women's Air Pistol Pairs |
| Bronze medal – third place | 1998 Kuala Lumpur | 25 metre sport pistol |
| Bronze medal – third place | 2006 Melbourne | 25 metre sport pistol |
| Bronze medal – third place | 2006 Melbourne | 25 metre sport pistol pairs |
| Bronze medal – third place | 2006 Melbourne | 10 metre air pistol |
Pan American Games
| Gold medal – first place | 1999 Winnipeg | 10 metre air pistol |

Kim Eagles (born 15 December 1976) is a Canadian sport shooter. Eagles won a gold medal at the 1999 Pan American Games in the 10 metre air pistol event. She also participated in the 2000 Summer Olympics in the 10 metre air pistol event.

She first competed at the Commonwealth Games in 1998, winning a bronze medal in the 25 metre sport pistol event. She went on to win a gold medal at the 2002 Commonwealth Games in the 10 metre air pistol pairs event with Dorothy Ludwig and three bronze medals at the 2006 Commonwealth Games in the 25 metre sport pistol, 25 metre sport pistol pairs with Avianna Chao and the 10 metre air pistol events.
