= Inverleith Hockey Club =

Scottish field hockey club

- Full name: Inverleith Hockey Club
- League: Scottish Hockey National Leagues
- Founded: 1917
- Home ground: Edinburgh Academy Field, E Fettes Avenue
- Website: Official website

Inverleith Hockey Club is a field hockey club that is based in the north of Edinburgh, Scotland and play their matches at Edinburgh Academy Field on E Fettes Avenue. They are located very close to ESM Hockey Club. The men's section has four teams and the women's section also has four teams. Additionally there is a junior/youth section with five various age teams.

== History ==
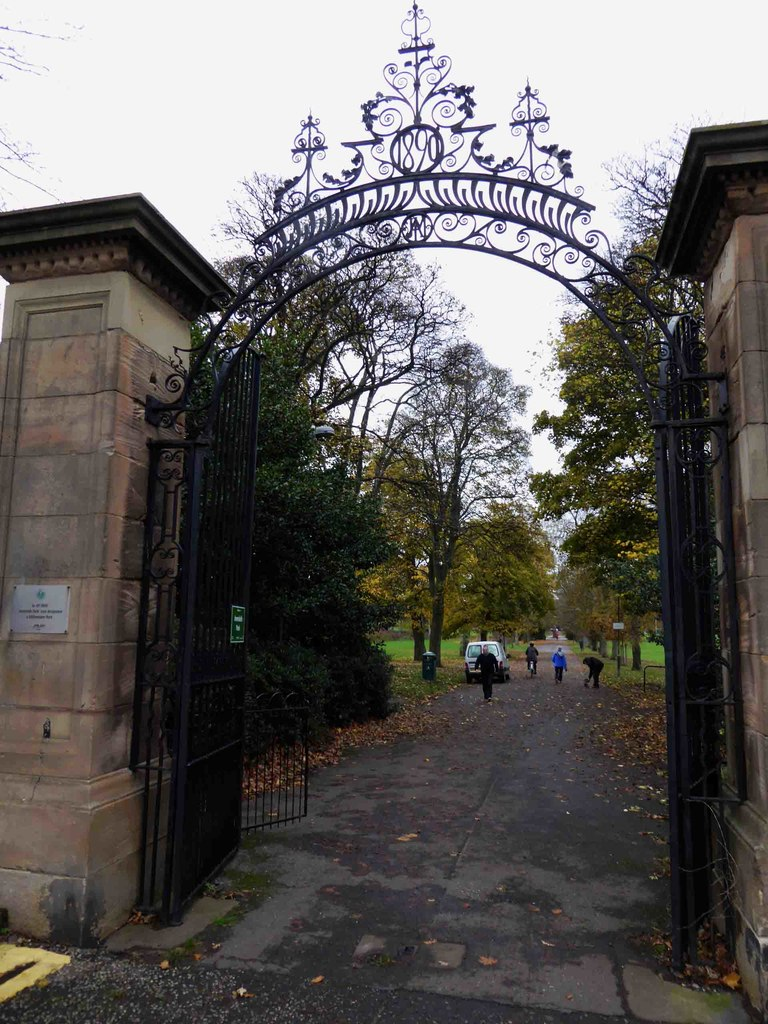
Inverleith Park, the club's original base

In 1917, staff at the North British Rubber Co. formed a hockey club and named it Inverleith Hockey Club because the team would play their matches at Inverleith Park. However, the difficulty of finding a playable grass pitch over the following two decades led to the club playing at various public parks and venues such as Murrayfield and Drylaw Mains.

In 1933 Frank Morris, an original member died from pneumonia. Morris played 14 times as a goalkeeper for Scotland between 1926 and 1932.

In 1947, after a break due to World War II, several former players revived the club but the issue of a home base remained, over the following decades the team had to endure multiple playing locations, including Redford Barracks, Castlebrae School, Frogston, Meadowbank, Saughton and Currie. By 1958, Inverleith had four teams playing in the District Leagues but found themselves with an excess of players, which led to members helping form other clubs in the area, such as Edinburgh Civil Service Hockey Club and Broughton School FP Hockey Club. During the 1960s Inverleith was considered the strongest team in Scotland but ironically Edinburgh Civil Service went on to dominate Scottish hockey.

Inverleith did however win the Scottish Cup in 1968 and 1975 and represented Scotland in the European Club Championships. Player Dennis Hay appeared at the 1972 Summer Olympics and in 1976, Ken Dick played for Great Britain and Stewart McNulty earned 64 caps for Ireland. In 1981 the men's first XI achieved their highest placing to date, finishing runner-up in National league 1, behind Edinburgh Civil Service Hockey Club during the 1980–81 season.

The men's team won National League 2 in 1986 and 1990, while the women's team won National League 2 in 2012 and 2022.

In 2005, Forrester Ladies Hockey Club amalgamated into the Inverleith women's section and the following year there were five Inverleith players in the Scottish team at the 2006 Commonwealth Games in Melbourne, including Stephen Dick who went to the 2008 Summer Olympics.

== Notable players ==
=== Men's internationals ===
Extended content

Player	Events	Notes/Ref
(Scotland) Allan Dick	CG (2006)	
(Scotland) Ken Dick	GB caps	
(Scotland) Stephen Dick	Oly (2008), CG (2006, 2010)	
(Scotland) David Forrester	2012–2013	
(Scotland) Chris Grassick	2008–2010	
(Scotland) Adam Mackenzie	CG (2006)	
(Scotland) Frank Morris	14 caps, 1926-32	
(Scotland) Dennis Hay	Oly (1972)	
(Republic of Ireland) Stewart McNulty	64 caps	
(Scotland) Graham Moodie	CG (2006)	
(Scotland) Derek Salmond	CG (2010)	

Key

- Oly = Olympic Games
- CG = Commonwealth Games
- WC = World Cup
- CT = Champions Trophy
- EC = European Championships
