= Dennis Hay =

British field hockey player

Personal information
- Born: 5 October 1949 Aberdeen, Scotland
- Died: 15 June 2025 (aged 75) Edinburgh, Scotland
- Height: 177 cm (5 ft 10 in)
- Weight: 64 kg (141 lb)

Sport
- Sport: Field hockey
Senior career
Years	Team	Caps	Goals
1966–1973	Inverleith	-	-
National team
Years	Team	Caps	Goals
1966–1972	Great Britain		-
1964–1974	Scotland		-

Dennis Hay (5 October 1940 – 15 June 2025) was a Scottish field hockey player, who competed for Great Britain at the 1972 Summer Olympics.

== Biography ==
Hay played club hockey for Inverleith and made his Great Britain debut on 29 April 1966, going on to earn 15 GB caps. At the 1972 Olympic Games in Munich, he represented Great Britain in the field hockey tournament.

His brother Ken also played hockey.

Later he became a coach, taking Scotland to the 1986 Women's Hockey World Cup, leading the GB Women's Team to the bronze medal at the 1992 Summer Olympics in Barcelona, Spain, after having finished in fourth place at the 1988 Summer Olympics. He is widely regarded as the father of hockey at Edinburgh University Men's Hockey Club, at the University of Edinburgh.

In collaboration with sprints coach Stuart Dempster, Dennis assisted writing "101 Youth Hockey Drills" (A+C Black, London) in 2008 with a revised version in 2010. The book provides hockey drills based on movement patterns relating to hockey.
