= Linda Brennan =

Scottish international lawn bowler

Personal information
- Nationality: British (Scottish)
- Born: c.1967
- Died: 26 January 2018 (aged 51)

Sport
- Sport: Lawn and indoor bowls
- Club: Middleston Hall BC, Blantyre BC; Glasgow IBC

Linda Brennan (c.1967 – 26 January 2018) was an international lawn and indoor bowler from Scotland who competed at the Commonwealth Games.

== Biography ==
Brennan was a member of the Blantyre Bowls Club and the Glasgow Indoor Bowls Club, although she previously bowled for the Middleton Hall Bowls Club. She represented Scotland at international level from 1995 to 2009.

Brennan represented the Scottish team at the 2006 Commonwealth Games in Melbourne, Australia, where she competed in the triples event, with Seona Black and Betty Forsyth.

Brennan, a proprietor of David Gourlay Bowls, died on 26 January 2018 aged 51.
