= Seona Black =

Scottish lawn bowler

Personal information
- Nationality: British (Scottish)
- Born: 23 November 1954 (age 71)

Sport
- Sport: Lawn and indoor bowls
- Club: Bonnybridge BC
Medal record
Representing (Scotland)
Atlantic Bowls Championships
Silver medal – second place	2005 Bangor	fours

Seona Cunningham Black (born 23 November 1954) is a former Scottish international lawn bowler.

== Biography ==
Black represented the Scottish team at the 2006 Commonwealth Games in Melbourne, Australia, where she competed in the triples event, with Linda Brennan and Betty Forsyth.

In 2005 she won a fours silver medal at the Atlantic Bowls Championships.
