= Neil Menzies =

British field hockey player

Sport
- Sport: Field hockey
- Position: Midfield
Senior career
Years	Team	Caps	Goals
1975–1981	Aberdeen Univ	-	-
1976-1982	Ruthrieston	-	-
1982–1984	Perthshire	-	-
1984–1998	Western Wildcats	-	-
National team
Years	Team	Caps	Goals
1977–	Scotland		-
–	Great Britain		-
Medal record
Field hockey
Representing Great Britain
Champions Trophy
Bronze medal – third place	1978 Lahore	Team

Neil G. Menzies is a former hockey international player and coach, who represented Scotland and Great Britain. He also coached at 13 international tournaments.

== Biography ==
Menzies was educated at Perth Academy and studied at the University of Aberdeen

He was part of the first ever Scotland U21 team in 1976. Menzies played club hockey for Ruthrieston, where he became the club captain and made his Scottish debut in 1977. He joined Western Wildcats Hockey Club in Glasgow and proceeded to represent Scotland at three Men's EuroHockey Championships.

Menzies was part of the bronze-medal winning Great Britain team that competed at the inaugural 1978 Men's Hockey Champions Trophy, in Lahore, Pakistan

He was selected for the Great Britain team for the 1980 Olympic Games in Moscow, but subsequently did not attend due to the boycott and Illness prevented Menzies from possible selection for the 1984 Summer Olympics.

After turning to coaching, he helped Glasgow Western Ladies become multiple Scottish champions and claim three silver and one bronze medals in European competition from 1988 to 1991.

In 2012, following a career in IT, Menzies joined Scottish Hockey on a full-time basis. He then became their Talent Pathway Head Coach before retiring from coaching in 2023, following a 50-year association with the sport.
