= Eric Johannes =

South African international lawn and indoor bowler

Personal information
- Nationality: South Africa
- Born: 6 July 1962 (age 63) Cape Town

Sport
- Club: Warilla BC
Medal record
Lawn bowls
Representing South Africa
Commonwealth Games
Bronze medal – third place	2006 Melbourne	triples

Eric Johannes (born 6 July 1962) is a former South African international lawn and indoor bowler.

He won a bronze medal in the triples with Gidion Vermeulen and Neil Burkett at the 2006 Commonwealth Games in Melbourne.

He lives in New South Wales in Australia and plays for the Warilla Bowls Club.
