= Hugh Neilson =

Scottish field hockey player

Personal information
- Born: 5 May 1884 Glasgow, Scotland
- Died: 16 October 1930 (aged 46) Glasgow, Scotland

Sport
- Sport: Field hockey
- Position: Full-back
Senior career
Years	Team	Caps	Goals
1908	Rutherglen	-	-
1913	Western	-	-
National team
Years	Team	Caps	Goals
–	Scotland		-
Medal record
Men's field hockey
Representing Great Britain
Bronze medal – third place	1908 London	Team competition

Hugh Edwin Beaumont Neilson (5 May 1884 – 16 October 1930) was a Scottish field hockey player who competed in the 1908 Summer Olympics. In 1908 he won the bronze medal as member of the Scotland team.

== Biography ==
Neilson was born in Glasgow, the son of steel founder and lost both parents by the age of 10. He studied at the University of Sheffield.

He represented his country at tennis, badminton and field hockey and played club hockey for Rutherglen Hockey Club and later Western Hockey Club.

He was a marine engineer by trade.
