= Colin Mitchell (bowls) =

Scottish international lawn bowler

Personal information
- Nationality: British (Scottish)
- Born: c.1973

Sport
- Sport: Lawn and indoor bowls
- Club: Carrick Knowe BC; Bainfield IBC

Colin Mitchell (born c.1973) is a former international lawn and indoor bowler from Scotland who competed at the Commonwealth Games.

== Biography ==
Mitchell was a member of the Carrick Knowe Bowls Club and Bainfield Indoor Bowls Club.

He represented Scotland at international level from 1995 to 2009.

Mitchell represented the Scottish team at the 2006 Commonwealth Games in Melbourne, Australia, where he competed in the triples event, with Colin Peacock and David Peacock.

In 2024, his son Charlie Mitchell captained the Scotland team when winning the Youths Home International bowls title in Belfast.
