= Gina le Long =

Lawn bowler

Personal information
- Nationality: British (Jersey)
- Born: 1 August 1959 (age 66)
Medal record
Representing Jersey
Atlantic Bowls Championships
Bronze medal – third place	2005 Bangor	triples

Gina Doris le Long (born 1959) is a former international lawn bowler from Jersey.

== Bowls career ==
Le Long has represented Jersey at the Commonwealth Games, in the triples event at the 2006 Commonwealth Games.

In 2005 she won the triples bronze medal at the Atlantic Bowls Championships.
