= Shooting at the 2014 Commonwealth Games – Women's double trap =

Shooting – Women's double trap at the 2014 Commonwealth Games
- Venue: Barry Buddon Shooting Centre
- Dates: 27 July 2014
- Competitors: 8 from 4 nations

Medalists
gold medal	Charlotte Kerwood	England
silver medal	Shreyasi Singh	India
bronze medal	Rachel Parish	England

The Women's double trap took place on 27 July 2014 at the Barry Buddon Shooting Centre. There was a qualification in which the top 8 athletes qualified for the finals.

== Results ==
Rank	Name	1	2	3	4	Total	Shoot-off
1st place, gold medalist(s)	Charlotte Kerwood (ENG)	26	25	24	19	94	
2nd place, silver medalist(s)	Shreyasi Singh (IND)	22	24	23	23	92	
3rd place, bronze medalist(s)	Rachel Parish (ENG)	25	21	24	21	91	1+1+1
4	Cynthia Meyer (CAN)	22	22	24	23	91	1+1
5	Varsha Varman (IND)	22	19	24	23	88	
6	Emma Cox (AUS)	21	20	22	22	85	
7	Gaye Shale (AUS)	20	16	25	19	80	
8	Susan Nattrass (CAN)	19	19	18	16	72	
