= Sue Harriott =

English Indoor & Lawn Bowler

Personal information
- Nationality: British (English)
- Born: 11 December 1947 (age 78)

Sport
- Club: Exmouth Madeira BC
Medal record
Lawn bowls
Representing England
Commonwealth Games
Bronze medal – third place	2006 Melbourne	triples
Atlantic Bowls Championships
Gold medal – first place	2005 Bangor	triples
Gold medal – first place	2005 Bangor	fours
British Isles Championships
Gold medal – first place	2002	singles

Susan Lesley Harriott (born 11 December 1947) is a former English international lawn and indoor bowler.

== Bowls career ==
In 2005 she won the triples and fours gold medals at the Atlantic Bowls Championships.

She won a bronze medal in the triples with Amy Monkhouse and Jean Baker at the 2006 Commonwealth Games in Melbourne.

In 2006, she won the Bowler of the Year award after qualifying for the six main events at the Women's National Championships. Harriott was still competing at a high level in 2016 when participating in the county championships for Madeira Bowling Club.

Harriott won the National singles title in 2001 and subsequently won the singles at the British Isles Bowls Championships in 2002.
