= Susan Jackson (sport shooter) =

British sport shooter (born 1953)

Personal information
- Nationality: British
- Born: 20 April 1973 (age 53)

Sport
- Country: Scotland; United Kingdom
- Sport: Shooting sport
- Event: 50 metre rifle prone
- Club: Dunfermline Rifle Club; University of Edinburgh Rifle Club; University of Edinburgh Alumni Rifle Club
Medal record
Women's shooting
Representing Scotland
Commonwealth Games
Gold medal – first place	2006 Melbourne	50 m rifle prone pairs
Silver medal – second place	2002 Manchester	50 m rifle prone pairs
Bronze medal – third place	1998 Kuala Lumpur	50 m rifle prone pairs
Commonwealth Shooting Championships
Gold medal – first place	2001 Bisley	50 m rifle prone

Susan Jackson (née Bell; born 20 April 1973) is a retired British sport shooter. She won medals at the 1998, 2002 and 2006 Commonwealth Games representing Scotland in the Women's Prone Rifle Pairs event.

She represented Great Britain at the 1998 ISSF World Shooting Championships, and at the 1998, 2001 and 2002 European Shooting Championships.

== Personal life ==
Jackson attended the University of Edinburgh, graduating with an MA (Hons) in Economics and Accounting in 1995.

Jackson worked as a chartered accountant for Deloitte for 12 years, leaving in 2007 to work for the Winning Scotland Foundation - a youth sports charity in Scotland.

She later joined Campion Homes, a housebuilding firm founded by her father, becoming Managing Director in 2017.

Jackson served as an Athletes Representative to the Board of Commonwealth Games Scotland from 2011 to 2015, when she was elected to the Board with responsibility for finance.

== Sporting career ==
At the 1998 Commonwealth Games, she won bronze in the 50m rifle prone pairs partnering with Shirley McIntosh.

At the 2002 Commonwealth Games, she won silver in the 50m rifle prone pairs partnering with Sheena Sharp. At the 2006 Commonwealth Games, Sharp and Jackson went one better and won gold in the same event.

In 2012 Jackson was inducted into the University of Edinburgh's Sporting Hall of Fame.
