= Derek Salmond =

Scottish field hockey player (born 1984)

Personal information
- Born: 6 January 1984 (age 42) Scotland

Sport
- Sport: Field hockey
- Position: Midfield
Senior career
Years	Team	Caps	Goals
1992–2023	Inverleith	-	-
National team
Years	Team	Caps	Goals
2005–2013	Scotland	64	-

Derek Salmond (born 6 January 1984) is a Scottish former field hockey player who has represented Scotland at the 2010 Commonwealth Games.

== Biography ==
Salmond was educated at George Heriot's School and Loughborough University.

He played club hockey as a midfielder for Inverleith Hockey Club in the Scottish Hockey Premiership and was named the club's player of the decade.

He represented Scotland at the 2010 Commonwealth Games in Delhi and made further appearances for his nation at the 2011 Celtic Cup and in 2013.

Since 2007, Salmond has worked in the medical supplies industry, while continuing to play for Inverleith.
