= Natalia Rahman =

Australian sport shooter (born 1982)

Personal information
- Nationality: Australia
- Born: 24 July 1982 (age 44) Melbourne, Victoria, Australia
- Height: 1.61 m (5 ft 3 1/2 in)
- Weight: 50 kg (110 lb)

Sport
- Sport: Shooting
- Event: Skeet
- Club: Frankston Australian Clay; Target Club
- Coached by: Goran Rahman
Medal record
Women's shooting
Representing Australia
Commonwealth Games
Gold medal – first place	2002 Manchester	Skeet pairs
Silver medal – second place	2002 Manchester	Skeet
Gold medal – first place	2006 Melbourne	Skeet pairs

Natalia Rahman (born 24 July 1982 in Melbourne, Victoria) is an Australian sport shooter. She won a gold and silver medal in the women's skeet shooting, at the 2002 Commonwealth Games, a gold medal at the 2006 Commonwealth Games, coincidentally in her home city, accumulating a score of 90 targets. She has also won a bronze medal for Australia at the world cup in Shanghai (and to date remains the only female skeet shooter to win a medal for Australia at a World Cup or World Championships), and bronze medal at the World Championships in Cairo, and silver medal at the World Championships in Finland. Rahman is also the sister of two-time Olympian Paul Rahman (2004 and 2008), and the daughter of her personal coach Goran Rahman.

Rahman represented Australia at the 2008 Summer Olympics in Beijing, where she competed in women's skeet shooting. She placed eleventh in the qualifying rounds of the event by two points behind Romania's Lucia Mihalache from the final attempt, with a total score of 66 targets.
