= Sheena Sharp =

British sport shooter (born 1953)

Personal information
- Nationality: British
- Born: 13 April 1953 (age 73) Torphins, Aberdeenshire, Scotland

Sport
- Country: United Kingdom
- Sport: Shooting sport
- Events: 50 metre rifle prone; 10 metre air rifle; 50 metre rifle three positions
- Club: Huntly; Bon Accord
Medal record
Women's shooting
Representing Scotland
Commonwealth Games
Gold medal – first place	2006 Melbourne	50 m rifle prone singles
Gold medal – first place	2006 Melbourne	50 m rifle prone pairs
Silver medal – second place	2002 Manchester	50 m rifle prone pairs
- Updated on 4 September 2012

Sheena Sharp (born 13 April 1953) is a British sport shooter. She won two gold medals at the 2006 Commonwealth Games in the Women's Prone Rifle events.

== Career ==
Sharp started first shooting at the age of 11 before stopping at 16. Picking up the sport again over 20 years later, she progressed quickly and soon earn selection first with the Scottish and then the Great Britain team.

Attending her first Commonwealth Games in 2002, she won silver in the 50m rifle prone pairs partnering with Susan Jackson. At the 2006 Commonwealth Games, Sharp and Jackson went one better and won gold in the same event. Sharp also won a second gold in the 50m rifle prone singles event.

In 2018, she reached 150 caps for Scotland.

In 2019, it was announced that a street in Huntly would be named "Sheena Sharp Drive" in her honour.
