= Nicola Lewis =

Welsh netball player (born 1977)

Personal information
- Born: 9 February 1977 (age 49)
- Height: 1.78 m (5 ft 10 in)

Netball career
- Playing positions: GS, GA
Years	National team	Caps
1999–2006	Wales	
- Updated on 19 February 2010

Nicola Lewis (born 9 February 1977) was a Welsh netball player, playing in the positions of Goal Shooter and Goal Attack.

Lewis has represented Wales at all age groups and appeared as a member of the Wales national netball team at the World Youth Cup in Canada in 1996. She has gained 29 caps for Wales including the 1999 Netball World Championships in Christchurch, NZ and the 2002 European Netball Championships. She was selected as part of the squad of 17 to represent Wales at the 2002 Commonwealth Games in Manchester, England, but broke her ankle during preparation and was forced to withdraw from the squad.

After missing out on the Commonwealth Games, Lewis retired from international netball but continued to play for her club, Cardiff Central. She joined the club as an 11-year-old after her PE teachers saw her play at school and recruited her. Lewis worked as a P.E teacher and as a Netball Development Officer for the Caerphilly County Borough Council. Her netball career saw something of a revival, however, with the birth of the United Kingdom–wide Netball Superleague in 2006, with Lewis appearing for the Welsh Celtic Dragons team. She was subsequently selected to go to the 2006 Commonwealth Games in Melbourne, Australia.
