= Lauryn Mark =

Australian sports shooter (born 1980)

Medal record

Representing Australia

Women's shooting

Commonwealth Games
Gold medal – first place	2002 Manchester	Skeet Individual
Gold medal – first place	2002 Manchester	Skeet Pairs
Gold medal – first place	2006 Melbourne	Skeet Pairs
Silver medal – second place	2006 Melbourne	Skeet Individual

Lauryn Annyn Mark (née Ogilvie, born April 15, 1980, in Los Gatos, California, United States) is an American Australian Olympic Women's Skeet shooter. Mark won a silver medal at the 2003 World Cup Final (Rome), she is a dual Olympian, finishing fourth in Women's Skeet in the 2004 Summer Olympics and won three gold medals at the 2002 Commonwealth Games and the 2006 Commonwealth Games. In 1995 at Chicago, Illinois, she won the World Junior Women’s American Skeet Championship.

== Career ==
Lauryn Annyn Ogilvie was born on April 15, 1980, in Los Gatos, California, to clay shooter Jon Ogilvie. She commenced shooting in 1991, she won the World Junior Women’s American Skeet Title in 1995 and started formally competing internationally in June 1997 at the World Championships in Peru. She became the youngest competitor ever to win Women's Skeet in the United States Open Skeet Championship in 1999. In 2003, she won the silver medal in the Women's Skeet event at the World Cup Final in Rome.

After moving to Australia, Lauryn Mark won eight individual Australian National Women's Skeet Championships. In 2012 she competed in her second Summer Olympics. She retired from competitive competition in 2014 and is now employed by the ISSF as a coaching lecturer and examiner for their International Coaching Academy.

In 2012, she controversially became a men's magazine cover girl when she posed for Zoo Weekly wearing a bikini in Australian Olympic Team's green-and-gold color whilst holding a Beretta double-barrel shotgun. The remuneration she received from the magazine was donated to the Royal Children's Hospital in Melbourne.

Lauryn Mark was a contestant on the inaugural series of the Australian television series of Australian Ninja Warrior in 2017.

== Personal life ==
In 1999, Ogilvie established a corporate entertainment business, "Go Shooting" Pty. Ltd., with Australian Olympic gold medallist Russell Mark. She established the hugely successful "Go Shooting YouTube Channel" in 2018. She married Russell Mark in a surprise wedding ceremony on March 17, 2004, at a Hamilton Island beach. The couple have two children, Sierra Evelyn Mark (b. 23 June 2005) and Indiana Todd Mark (b. 29 January 2007).
