= Stephen Dick =

British field hockey player (born 1985)

Personal information
- Born: 21 June 1985 (age 41) Kirkcaldy, Scotland

Sport
- Sport: Field hockey
- Position: Forward
Senior career
Years	Team	Caps	Goals
2006–2010	Inverleith	-	-
2008–2009	Edinburgh University	-	-
National team
Years	Team	Caps	Goals
–	Scotland	120	-
2007–2008	GB	29	-
Medal record
Representing Scotland
European Championship II
Bronze medal – third place	2011 Vinnytsia	Team

Stephen Alexander Dick (born 21 June 1985) is a Scottish former field hockey player who played as a forward and represented Scotland and Great Britain and competed at the 2008 Summer Olympics.

== Biography ==
Dick was born in Kirkcaldy, Scotland and attended Balwearie High School.

While playing for Inverleith Hockey Club in the Scottish league he represented the Scotland Commonwealth Games team at the 2006 Commonwealth Games in Melbourne.

Dick made his Great Britain debut on 23 October 2007. He played club hockey for Edinburgh University and during his time as a student at the University of Edinburgh was awarded the EUSU Vancouver Quaich for best athletic performance by a male student for the 2008/09 season, and the Scottish Universities Sport's Athlete of the Year award in 2009.

Again while playing for Inverleith he represented Great Britain at the 2008 Olympic Games in Beijing.

Dick, still at Inverleith, played for Scotland during the 2010 Commonwealth Games in Delhi and won a bronze medal with the team at the 2011 Men's EuroHockey Championship II in Vinnytsia, Ukraine.

At retirement he had won 120 caps representing Scotland and 29 caps representing Great Britain.
