= Andrew Atwood =

Welsh lawn bowler

Personal information
- Nationality: British (Welsh)
- Born: 11 March 1966 (age 60) Caerphilly, Wales

Sport
- Sport: Lawn bowls
- Club: Caerphilly Town Bowling Club
Medal record
Representing Wales
Atlantic Bowls Championships
Gold medal – first place	2007 Ayr	triples
Bronze medal – third place	2007 Ayr	fours

Andrew Atwood (born 11 March 1966) is a Welsh international lawn bowler.

== Bowls career ==
Atwood was born in Caerphilly, South Wales. Atwood competed for the Welsh team at the 2006 Commonwealth Games in the triples.

In 2007, he won the triples gold medal and fours bronze medal at the Atlantic Bowls Championships

He is a Welsh champion winning the 1996 pairs at the Welsh National Bowls Championships.

== Family ==
His older sister Julie is a children's author who has written numerous stories incorporating the issue of childhood obsessive compulsive disorder.
