= David Mansouri =

Scottish field hockey player

Personal information
- Born: 21 October 1982 (age 43) Glasgow, Scotland

Sport
- Sport: Field hockey
- Position: Midfield
Senior career
Years	Team	Caps	Goals
2006	Univ of Glasgow	-	-
2006–2014	Western Wildcats	-	-
National team
Years	Team	Caps	Goals
–	Scotland		-

David Mansouri (born 21 October 1982) is a male former field hockey player from Scotland.

== Biography ==
Mansouri earned his first cap for the Scotland men's national field hockey team in 2004.

He played club hockey for Western Wildcats and came through the club's youth system in the late nineties and originally claimed his place in the first team as a fullback. His dedication led to his first 19 caps in 2004.

He was part of the Scotland Commonwealth Games team at the 2006 Commonwealth Games in Melbourne.

As a midfield player, he joined the 1st team. Alongside his professional life as a surgeon, he maintained his commitment to hockey and assumed the captaincy in 2009–10. Mansouri continued to play for the 1st team until he retired from 1st team hockey in 2014.
