= Graham Dunlop =

British field hockey player

Personal information
- Born: 21 May 1976 (age 50) Glasgow, Scotland
- Height: 175 cm (5 ft 9 in)
- Weight: 69 kg (152 lb)

Sport
- Sport: Field hockey
Senior career
Years	Team	Caps	Goals
–	Grange	-	-
2006	Western Wildcats	-	-
National team
Years	Team	Caps	Goals
2004–2004	GB	30	-
–	Scotland		-

Graham Barry Dunlop (born 21 May 1976) is a former field hockey player from Scotland. He competed at the 2004 Summer Olympics.

== Biography ==
Dunlop Great Britain debut on 4 February 2004 and was a member of the Great Britain hockey squad that competed at the 2004 Olympics in Athens, Greece.

Dunlop played club hockey for Western Wildcats in the Scottish leagues.

Dunlop was part of the Scotland Commonwealth Games team at the 2006 Commonwealth Games in Melbourne.
