= Charlotte Kerwood =

British sports shooter

Charlotte Hollands
Personal information
- Nationality: British
- Born: 15 September 1986 (age 39) Cuckfield, England
- Height: 1.72 m (5 ft 7 1/2 in)
- Weight: 62 kg (137 lb)

Sport
- Country: United Kingdom
- Sport: Sport shooter
- Event: Trap
Medal record
Representing England
Gold medal – first place	2002 Manchester	Double trap
Gold medal – first place	2006 Melbourne	Double trap
Gold medal – first place	2006 Melbourne	Double trap pairs
Gold medal – first place	2014 Glasgow	Double trap
- Updated on 28 July 2014

Charlotte Hollands (née Kerwood, born 15 September 1986) is a British sports shooter. She won her first Commonwealth Gold medal at the age of 15 at the 2002 Commonwealth Games. In 2015 World Championship, she was part of the British team that won gold in the team trap event.

== Early life ==
She attended Warden Park School.

== Career ==
Kerwood was born in Cuckfield and her parents are also sports shooters, running Northall Clay Pigeon Club, where Kerwood began shooting at the age of 12. She won her first Commonwealth Gold medal at the age of 15 at the 2002 Commonwealth Games in Manchester. In 2002, she also won the women's double trap at the Junior European Championship.

At the 2012 Summer Olympics, she competed in the trap event, but did not make the final. Her selection was controversial as she was ranked 10 places lower in the world rankings than Abbey Burton who was not selected. The selection was challenged by Burton but an independent arbiter referred the decision back to British Shooting, who remained steadfast in their original opinion. She finished in 16th place, not qualifying for the final.

In 2013, Kerwood won the trap event at the World Cup Final event in Abu Dhabi, beating Jana Beckmann in the gold medal match by 11 hits to 10. It was the first time she'd reached the final of a World Cup Final event, although she had previously qualified to participate at the 2006 and 2007 World Cup Finals.

At the 2014 Commonwealth Games she again won the gold medal, shooting 94 out of 120 clays.

At the 2015 World Championship, she was part of the British team that won gold in the team trap event. She did not reach the finals in the individual event, although she was part of a 6-person shoot-off to decide the last entrant to the finals.

Unusually, she only uses one gun to shoot with, a hand-made Perazzi 12-bore shotgun. She still competes at Northall Clay Pigeon Club, and is coached by Ahmed Al Maktoum, himself an Olympic gold medallist.
