= Lawn bowls at the 2006 Commonwealth Games =

- Venue: Darebin International Sports Centre
- Location: Thornbury, Victoria, Australia
- Dates: 15 to 26 March 2006

Lawn bowls at the 2006 Commonwealth Games was the 17th appearance of lawn bowls at the Commonwealth Games. The events were held in Melbourne, Australia, from 15 to 26 March 2006.

Competition was held at the State Lawn Bowls Centre, north of Melbourne, at the Darebin International Sports Centre in Thornbury, Victoria, Australia.

Australia topped the lawn bowls medal table by virtue of winning three gold medals.

== Medal table ==
Rank	Nation	Gold	Silver	Bronze	Total
1	Australia*	3	1	1	5
2	Malaysia	2	0	0	2
3	Scotland	1	1	0	2
4	Wales	0	2	0	2
5	England	0	1	1	2
6	Northern Ireland	0	1	0	1
7	South Africa	0	0	2	2
8	Canada	0	0	1	1
8	New Zealand	0	0	1	1
Totals (9 entries)		6	6	6	18

== Medallists ==
Event	Gold	Silver	Bronze
Men's singles	(Australia) Kelvin Kerkow	(Wales) Robert Weale	(Canada) Ryan Bester
Men's pairs	(Scotland) Alex Marshall; Paul Foster	(England) Ian Bond; Mark Bantock	(Australia) Barrie Lester; Nathan Rice
Men's Triples	(Australia) Mark Casey; Bill Cornehls; Wayne Turley	(Northern Ireland) Jeremy Henry; Mark McPeak; Neil Booth	(South Africa) Eric Johannes; Gidion Vermeulen; Neil Burkett
Women's singles	(Malaysia) Siti Zalina Ahmad	(Wales) Betty Morgan	(South Africa) Lorna Trigwell
Women's pairs	(Australia) Karen Murphy; Lynsey Armitage	(Scotland) Joyce Lindores; Kay Moran	(New Zealand) Jan Khan; Marina Khan
Women's Triples	(Malaysia) Azlina Arshad; Nor Hashimah Ismail; Nor Iryani Azmi	(Australia) Ceri Ann Davies; Noi Tucker; Roma Dunn	(England) Amy Monkhouse; Jean Baker; Sue Harriott

== Results ==
=== Men's singles ===
Section A

Pos	Player	P	W	L	F	A	Pts
1	(Fiji) Caucau Turagabeci	5	4	1	69	71	8
2	(South Africa) Gerry Baker	5	3	2	90	61	6
3	(Scotland) Darren Burnett	5	3	2	82	69	6
4	(Malta) Shaun Parnis	5	3	2	87	69	6
5	(Jersey) Allan Quemard	5	2	3	73	70	4
6	(Cook Islands) Mia Tuteru	5	0	5	46	107	0

Section B

Pos	Player	P	W	L	F	A	Pts
1	(Australia) Kelvin Kerkow	5	4	1	92	62	8
2	(Papua New Guinea) Peter Juni	5	4	1	66	68	8
3	(Namibia) Douw Calitz	5	3	2	74	73	6
4	(Malaysia) Mohd Afendy Tan Abdullah	5	2	3	70	75	4
5	(Northern Ireland) Martin McHugh	5	2	3	73	76	4
6	(Samoa) Ieremia Leautuli	5	0	5	64	85	0

Section C

Pos	Player	P	W	L	F	A	Pts
1	(Wales) Robert Weale	4	3	1	84	43	6
2	(Zambia) Edward Nkole Kasonde	4	2	2	61	62	4
3	(Norfolk Island) Neil Tall	4	2	2	61	65	4
4	(Brunei) Haji Naim Brahim	4	2	2	63	63	4
5	(Kenya) Michael Ojwang	4	1	3	36	72	2

Section D

Pos	Player	P	W	L	F	A	Pts
1	(England) Stephen Farish	4	4	0	81	38	8
2	(Canada) Ryan Bester	4	3	1	69	56	6
3	(New Zealand) Russell Meyer	4	2	2	71	47	4
4	(Guernsey) Matt Le Ber	4	1	3	44	74	2
5	(Niue) Lesley Lagatule	4	0	4	37	87	0

Finals

Quarter-finals
(Australia) Kerkow	9	10
(Zambia) Nkole	2	6
(England) Farish	7	5	2
(South Africa) Baker	6	10	1
(Wales) Weale	9	8
(Papua New Guinea) Juni	8	7
(Canada) Bester	7	8
(Fiji) Turagabeci	7	4

Semi-finals
(Australia) Kerkow	7	10
(England) Farish	7	8
(Wales) Weale	9	9
(Canada) Bester	9	8

Gold Medal Match
(Australia) Kerkow	7	2	2
(Wales) Weale	4	9	1
Bronze Medal Match
(Canada) Bester	7	11	2
(England) Farish	9	3	0

=== Men's pairs ===
Section A

Pos	Player	P	W	D	L	F	A	Pts
1	(Scotland) Paul Foster & Alex Marshall	5	5	0	0	124	49	10
2	(Fiji) Keshwa Goundar & Curtis Mar	5	3	0	2	85	62	6
3	(Jersey) Angus McKinnon & Derek Boswell	5	3	0	2	68	73	6
4	(Norfolk Island) John Christian & Keith Turton	5	3	0	2	71	88	6
5	(Papua New Guinea) Kila Vuiraka & Lucas Roika	5	1	0	4	68	90	2
6	(Niue) John Kimutai & Terri Teremoana	5	0	0	5	52	105	0

Section B

Pos	Player	P	W	D	L	F	A	Pts
1	(England) Mark Bantock & Ian Bond	4	3	0	1	68	51	6
2	(Malta) Francis Vella & Leonard Callus	4	3	0	1	73	54	6
3	(Cook Islands) David Akaruru & Glenford Porter	4	2	0	2	61	60	4
4	(Wales) Jason Greenslade & Neil Rees	4	2	0	2	68	56	4
5	(Samoa) Hans Gabriel & Valo Pritchard	4	0	0	4	33	82	0

Section C

Pos	Player	P	W	D	L	F	A	Pts
1	(South Africa) Shaun Addinall & Kevin Campbell	4	4	0	0	77	52	8
2	(Canada) Michel Larue & Keith Roney	4	2	0	2	70	57	4
3	(Northern Ireland) Jonathan Ross & Noel Graham	4	2	0	2	56	58	4
4	(Eswatini) Louis Erasmus & William James	4	1	0	3	60	62	2
5	(Brunei) Abdul Rahman bin Haji Omar & Pg Haji Tuah	4	1	0	3	43	77	2

Section D

Pos	Player	P	W	D	L	F	A	Pts
1	(Australia) Barrie Lester & Nathan Rice	4	4	0	0	83	46	8
2	(Malaysia) Fairul Izwan Abd Muin & Safuan Said	4	3	0	1	82	49	6
3	(New Zealand) Jamie Hill & Rowan Brassey	4	2	0	2	72	57	4
4	(Namibia) Alexander Joubert & Willem Esterhuizen Jr.	4	1	0	3	64	71	2
5	(Malawi) Bashir Shariff & Laurence Arthur	4	0	0	4	27	105	0

Finals

Quarter-finals
Scotland	7	8	2
Malaysia	8	7	0
Malta	10	9
South Africa	7	5
England	11	5	2
Canada	1	7	0
Australia	8	12
Fiji	5	3

Semi-finals
Scotland	10	7	2
Malta	7	8	0
England	12	9
Australia	7	5

Gold Medal Match
Scotland	11	2	2
England	6	12	0
Bronze Medal Match
Australia	9	7
Malta	5	7

=== Men's Triples ===
Section A

Pos	Player	P	W	D	L	F	A	Pts
1	(Cook Islands) Dennis Tokorangi, Phillip Jimmy, Vaine Henry	5	4	0	1	90	71	8
2	(Malaysia) Azwan Shuhaimi, Megat Mohd Zainuddin, Syed Mohamad Syed Akil	5	3	0	2	103	52	6
3	(Papua New Guinea) Joseph Taso, Kiliwi Nabo, Nadu Naman	5	3	0	2	73	91	6
4	(Guernsey) Alan Merrien, Ian Merrien, Paul Merrien	5	2	0	3	73	93	4
5	(Samoa) Edward Bell, Fagalima Saifiti, Liva Andrews	5	2	0	3	76	105	4
6	(Brunei) Ampuan Kasim, Haji Yahya, Lokman Haji Mohd	5	1	0	4	82	85	2

Section B

Pos	Player	P	W	D	L	F	A	Pts
1	(Northern Ireland) Jeremy Henry, Mark McPeak, Neil Booth	4	4	0	0	85	48	8
2	(New Zealand) Gary Lawson, Justin Goodwin, Richard Girvan	4	3	0	1	56	65	6
3	(Namibia) Ewald Vermeulen, Steven Peake, Willem Esterhuizen Sr.	4	2	0	2	61	79	4
4	(Wales) Andrew Atwood, Kevin Wall, Martin Selway	4	1	0	3	69	65	2
5	(Fiji) Ratish Lal, Saijad Khan, Som Padayachi	4	0	0	4	53	67	0

Section C

Pos	Player	P	W	D	L	F	A	Pts
1	(Australia) Bill Cornehls, Mark Casey, Wayne Turley	5	3	0	1	87	47	6
2	(Malta) Alfred Vella, Joseph Attard, Victor Brincat	5	3	0	1	60	57	6
3	(Canada) Chris Stadnyk, Mark Sandford, Steve McKerihen	5	2	0	2	64	61	4
4	(Kenya) Alan Gilham, Ian Stamp, Peter Streets	5	1	0	3	53	65	4
5	(Niue) Motufoli Vakaheketaha, Kolonisi Polima, Ezra Talamahina	5	1	0	3	49	83	2

Section D

Pos	Player	P	W	D	L	F	A	Pts
1	(England) Andy Thomson, Mervyn King, Robert Newman	4	4	0	0	75	46	8
2	(South Africa) Eric Johannes, Gidion Vermeulen, Neil Burkett	4	3	0	1	81	51	6
3	(Norfolk Island) Graeme Woolley, Barry Wilson, Gaetan Boudan	4	1	0	3	55	71	2
4	(Scotland) Colin Mitchell, Colin Peacock, David Peacock	4	1	0	3	52	77	2
5	(Jersey) John Lowery, Lee Nixon, Alan Shaw	4	1	0	3	50	68	2

Finals

Quarter-finals
Australia	12	5	2
New Zealand	5	7	0
South Africa	15	17
Cook Islands	1	4
Northern Ireland	15	12
Malta	6	4
England	11	10
Malaysia	6	2

Semi-finals
Australia	8	14
South Africa	3	2
Northern Ireland	6	5	2
England	4	8	1

Gold Medal Match
Australia	8	10
Northern Ireland	6	4
Bronze Medal Match
South Africa	5	11	2
England	7	2	1

=== Women's singles ===
Section A

Pos	Player	P	W	L	F	A	Pts
1	(Eswatini) Liz James	4	3	1	69	50	6
2	(Malaysia) Siti Zalina Ahmad	4	3	1	71	50	6
3	(England) Ellen Falkner	4	2	2	51	62	4
4	(Malawi) Zelda Humphreys	4	2	2	53	73	4
5	(Kenya) Maureen Burns	4	0	4	56	65	0

Section B

Pos	Player	P	W	L	F	A	Pts
1	(Australia) Maria Rigby	4	3	1	75	43	6
2	(Wales) Betty Morgan	4	3	1	60	67	6
3	(Jersey) Karina Bisson	4	3	1	57	62	6
4	(Canada) Lynn McElroy	4	1	3	52	66	2
5	(Norfolk Island) Essie Sanchez	4	0	4	56	62	0

Section C

Pos	Player	P	W	L	F	A	Pts
1	(Fiji) Litia Tikoisuva	4	4	0	67	54	8
2	(Northern Ireland) Margaret Johnston	4	3	1	58	67	6
3	(Cook Islands) Tangata Tokorangi	4	2	2	54	67	4
4	(New Zealand) Jo Edwards	4	1	3	67	57	2
5	(Niue) Elizabeth Rereiti	4	0	4	64	65	0

Section D

Pos	Player	P	W	L	F	A	Pts
1	(Guernsey) Alison Merrien	4	3	1	57	47	6
2	(South Africa) Lorna Trigwell	4	3	1	75	46	6
3	(Scotland) Margaret Letham	4	3	1	58	50	6
4	(Samoa) Dolly Maessen	4	1	3	44	66	2
5	(Botswana) Lebogang Moroke	4	0	4	47	72	0

Finals

Quarter-finals
(Malaysia) Zalina	6	12	2
(Guernsey) Merrien	10	6	0
(Northern Ireland) Johnston	11	4	2
(Australia) Rigby	3	10	1
(Wales) Morgan	10	11
(Fiji) Tikoisuava	10	2
(South Africa) Trigwell	8	4	2
(Eswatini) James	7	8	1

Semi-finals
(Malaysia) Zalina	11	8
(Northern Ireland) Johnston	2	4
(Wales) Morgan	8	6	2
(South Africa) Trigwell	5	8	1

Gold Medal Match
(Malaysia) Zalina	10	9
(Wales) Morgan	5	5
Bronze Medal Match
(South Africa) Trigwell	8	6	2
(Northern Ireland) Johnston	5	8	1

=== Women's pairs ===
Section A

Pos	Player	P	W	D	L	F	A	Pts
1	(Jersey) Gaynor Thomas & Suzie Dingle	8	7	0	1	151	98	14
2	(New Zealand) Marina Khan & Jan Khan	8	5	0	3	147	100	10
3	(Wales) Shirley King & Gill Miles	8	5	0	3	136	106	10
4	(Northern Ireland) Barbara Cameron & Donna McNally	8	5	0	3	152	106	10
5	(Cook Islands) Kanny Vaile & Porea Elisa	8	5	0	3	108	132	10
6	(Fiji) Akanisi Stephens & Marika Vakasilimi	8	4	0	4	120	123	8
7	(Isle of Man) Pauline Kelly & Margaret Payne	8	3	0	5	95	142	6
8	(Samoa) Lufi Taulealo & Manuia Porter	8	2	0	6	113	115	4
9	(Niue) Sisisalalima Limatau & Faua Moale Bell	8	0	0	8	81	181	0

Section B

Pos	Player	P	W	D	L	F	A	Pts
1	(Australia) Lynsey Armitage & Karen Murphy	8	6	0	2	169	92	12
2	(Scotland) Kay Moran & Joyce Lindores	8	6	0	2	133	100	10
3	(Eswatini) Karin Byars & Dawn Squires	8	5	0	3	120	112	10
4	(Zambia) Foster Banda & Eddah Mpezeni	8	4	0	4	137	109	8
5	(Malaysia) Bah Chu Mei & Haslah Hassan	8	4	0	4	121	116	8
6	(England) Catherine Popple & Katherine Hawes	8	4	0	4	113	128	8
7	(South Africa) Colleen Webb & Susan Nel	8	4	0	4	119	124	8
8	(Norfolk Island) Anne Pledger & Debbie Wilford	8	2	0	6	111	142	4
9	(Canada) Jean Roney & Jo Ann Bugler	8	1	0	7	78	178	2

Finals

Quarter-finals
Australia	10	9	2
Northern Ireland	6	12	0
New Zealand	12	6	2
(Eswatini) Swaziland	4	12	0
Scotland	8	5	2
Wales	8	5	1
Jersey	8	5	2
Zambia	7	8	0

Semi-finals
Australia	9	2	2
New Zealand	6	11	0
Scotland	10	10
Jersey	4	3

Gold Medal Match
Australia	11	13
Scotland	7	3
Bronze Medal Match
New Zealand	3	11	2
Jersey	8	5	1

=== Women's Triples ===
Section A

Pos	Player	P	W	D	L	F	A	Pts
1	(Australia) Ceri Ann Davies, Noi Tucker, Roma Dunn	7	7	0	0	159	80	14
2	(New Zealand) Serena Matthews, Sharon Sims, Val Smith	7	6	0	1	143	88	12
3	(Canada) Andrea Stadnyk, Anita Nivala, Leanne Chinery	7	4	0	3	108	132	8
4	(Jersey) Christine Grimes, Gean O'Neil, Gina le Long	7	3	0	4	130	116	6
5	(Samoa) Lena Adam, Tina Gabriel, Feao Wright	7	3	0	4	121	132	6
6	(Botswana) Ivy Motlhatlhedi, Sheila Spring, Tirelo Buckley	7	2	0	5	91	134	4
7	(Norfolk Island) Wendy Nagy, Kitha Bailey, Carole Yager	7	2	0	5	95	121	4
8	(Cook Islands) Mata Raeputa, Nane Tere, Dorothy Paniani	7	1	0	6	91	135	2

Section B

Pos	Player	P	W	D	L	F	A	Pts
1	(South Africa) Hendrika Lynn, Loraine Victor, Trish Steyn	6	5	0	1	107	75	10
2	(England) Amy Monkhouse, Jean Baker, Sue Harriott	6	4	0	2	128	79	8
3	(Malaysia) Azlina Arshad, Nor Iryani Azmi, Nor Hashimah Ismail	6	4	0	2	102	79	8
4	(Scotland) Betty Forsyth, Linda Brennan, Seona Black	6	2	0	4	108	92	8
5	(Wales) Kathy Pearce, Lisa Forey, Anwen Butten	6	2	0	4	104	84	4
6	(Fiji) Hilda Solomone, Sainiana Walker, Salanieta Valetu	6	2	0	4	79	98	4
7	(Brunei) Anne Strickland, Janet Pihiga, Liline Hewitt	6	1	0	5	51	172	2

Finals

Quarter-finals
Malaysia	7	12	2
New Zealand	9	5	1
Jersey	6	10
South Africa	4	10
Australia	7	13
Scotland	7	5
England	8	9	2
Canada	11	6	1

Semi-finals
Malaysia	12	16
Jersey	5	3
Australia	10	7
England	6	6

Gold Medal Match
Malaysia	12	13
Australia	12	4
Bronze Medal Match
England	11	9
Jersey	3	4

== Competition format ==
The lawn bowls program lasted over nine days with competition for both men and women in singles, pairs and triples. The preliminary rounds were held in a round-robin with the top eight in the competition making the quarter-finals. From the quarter-finals, the games were on a knockout format. The winners of the semi-finals played in the final to decide the gold and silver medallists.

== Venue ==
The State Lawn Bowls Centre was developed especially for the 2006 Commonwealth Games. In June 2003, Gordon Rich-Phillips, the Victorian Opposition spokesman on the Commonwealth Games, claimed that the venue was ten months behind schedule. Justin Madden, the minister responsible for the Commonwealth Games, claimed that the delay was due to community consultation to ensure that the venue met expectations but was confident that the venue would be ready. The venue was built in time for the Games.

== See also ==
- List of Commonwealth Games medallists in lawn bowls
- Lawn bowls at the Commonwealth Games
